= UFC 213 =

UFC mixed martial arts event in 2017

UFC 213: Romero vs. Whittaker
- The poster for UFC 213: Romero vs. Whittaker
- Promotion: Ultimate Fighting Championship
- Date: July 8, 2017
- Venue: T-Mobile Arena
- City: Paradise, Nevada
- Attendance: 12,834
- Total gate: $2,400,000
- Buyrate: 150,000

Event chronology
| The Ultimate Fighter: Redemption Finale | UFC 213: Romero vs. Whittaker | UFC Fight Night: Nelson vs. Ponzinibbio |

UFC 213: Romero vs. Whittaker was a mixed martial arts event produced by the Ultimate Fighting Championship held on July 8, 2017, at T-Mobile Arena in Paradise, Nevada, part of the Las Vegas metropolitan area.

== Background ==
The event took place during the UFC's annual International Fight Week.

A UFC Bantamweight Championship bout between current champion Cody Garbrandt and former champion T.J. Dillashaw was expected to take place at this event, possibly as the headliner. However, on May 23, Garbrandt withdrew due to a back injury and the bout was scrapped.

A UFC Women's Bantamweight Championship bout between current champion Amanda Nunes and multiple-time muay thai world champion Valentina Shevchenko was scheduled to headline this event. The pairing met previously in March 2016 at UFC 196, with Nunes winning by unanimous decision. However, the bout was canceled just hours before the event started due to Nunes being ill.

An interim UFC Middleweight Championship bout between 2000 Olympic silver medalist and former world champion in freestyle wrestling Yoel Romero and The Ultimate Fighter: The Smashes welterweight winner Robert Whittaker was expected to serve as the co-headliner. Due to the cancelation of the Nunes-Shevchenko bout, this fight was announced as the new main event.

A welterweight bout between former UFC Welterweight Champion Robbie Lawler and former UFC Lightweight Championship challenger Donald Cerrone was originally booked for UFC 205. However, Lawler pulled out to take a little more time after losing his title via knockout at UFC 201. The fight was rescheduled to take place at this event. Reports began to circulate on June 28 that Cerrone had sustained a minor injury and that the pairing would be left intact, but expected to shift to UFC 214 three weeks later. UFC President Dana White confirmed later that Cerrone in fact had a staph infection and a pulled groin, and while the plan was to keep the bout, it wouldn't happen at UFC 214. In the end, the bout was confirmed on July 2 for UFC 214.

Alan Jouban was expected to face Brian Camozzi at the event. However, on June 6, it was announced that Jouban pulled out due to a broken foot. He was replaced by The Ultimate Fighter Nations: Canada vs. Australia welterweight winner Chad Laprise.

A bantamweight bout between Douglas Silva de Andrade and Rob Font was originally booked for UFC 175 in July 2014. However, de Andrade was pulled from the bout due to injury and replaced by George Roop. The bout was then rescheduled for this event.

== Results ==
Main Card
| Weight class | | | | Method | Round | Time | Notes |
|---|---|---|---|---|---|---|---|
| Middleweight | Robert Whittaker | def. | Yoel Romero | Decision (unanimous) (48–47, 48–47, 48–47) | 5 | 5:00 | (Note: For the interim UFC Middleweight Championship.) |
| Heavyweight | Alistair Overeem | def. | Fabrício Werdum | Decision (majority) (28–28, 29–28, 29–28) | 3 | 5:00 |
| Heavyweight | Curtis Blaydes | def. | Daniel Omielańczuk | Decision (unanimous) (30–27, 30–27, 30–27) | 3 | 5:00 |
| Lightweight | Anthony Pettis | def. | Jim Miller | Decision (unanimous) (30–27, 30–27, 30–27) | 3 | 5:00 |
| Bantamweight | Rob Font | def. | Douglas Silva de Andrade | Submission (guillotine choke) | 2 | 4:36 |
Preliminary Card (Fox Sports 1)
| Heavyweight | Aleksei Oleinik | def. | Travis Browne | Submission (rear-naked choke) | 2 | 3:44 |
| Welterweight | Chad Laprise | def. | Brian Camozzi | TKO (punches) | 3 | 1:27 |
| Middleweight | Thiago Santos | def. | Gerald Meerschaert | TKO (punches) | 2 | 2:04 |
| Welterweight | Belal Muhammad | def. | Jordan Mein | Decision (unanimous) (29–28, 29–28, 30–27) | 3 | 5:00 |
Preliminary Card (UFC Fight Pass)
| Featherweight | Cody Stamann | def. | Terrion Ware | Decision (unanimous) (30–27, 30–27, 29–28) | 3 | 5:00 |
| Light Heavyweight | Trevin Giles | def. | James Bochnovic | KO (punches) | 2 | 2:54 |

== Bonus awards ==
The following fighters were awarded $50,000 bonuses:

- Fight of the Night: Robert Whittaker vs. Yoel Romero
- Performance of the Night: Rob Font and Chad Laprise

== Reported payout ==
The following is the reported payout to the fighters as reported to the Nevada State Athletic Commission. It does not include sponsor money and also does not include the UFC's traditional "fight night" bonuses. The total disclosed payout for the event was $2,596,000.

- Robert Whittaker: $350,000 (no win bonus) def. Yoel Romero: $350,000
- Alistair Overeem: $800,000 (no win bonus) def. Fabrício Werdum: $275,000
- Curtis Blaydes: $38,000 (includes $19,000 win bonus) def. Daniel Omielańczuk: $30,000
- Anthony Pettis: $180,000 (includes $90,000 win bonus) def. Jim Miller: $71,000
- Rob Font: $39,000 (includes $19,500 win bonus) def. Douglas Silva de Andrade: $18,000
- Oleksiy Oliynyk: $54,000 (includes $27,000 win bonus) def. Travis Browne: $120,000
- Chad Laprise: $48,000 (includes $24,000 win bonus) def. Brian Camozzi: $10,000
- Thiago Santos: $68,000 (includes $34,000 win bonus) def. Gerald Meerschaert: $14,000
- Belal Muhammad: $40,000 (includes $20,000 win bonus) def. Jordan Mein: $25,000
- Cody Stamann: $20,000 (includes $10,000 win bonus) def. Terrion Ware: $10,000
- Trevin Giles: $24,000 (includes $12,000 win bonus) def. James Bochnovic: $12,000

== See also ==
- List of UFC events
- 2017 in UFC
