= UFC on Fox: Maia vs. Condit =

UFC mixed martial arts event in 2016

UFC on Fox: Maia vs Condit
- The poster for UFC on Fox: Maia vs Condit
- Promotion: Ultimate Fighting Championship
- Date: August 27, 2016
- Venue: Rogers Arena
- City: Vancouver, British Columbia, Canada
- Attendance: 10,533
- Total gate: CA$995,624

Event chronology
UFC 202: Diaz vs. McGregor 2	UFC on Fox: Maia vs Condit	UFC Fight Night: Arlovski vs. Barnett

UFC on Fox: Maia vs. Condit (also known as UFC on Fox 21) was a mixed martial arts event produced by the Ultimate Fighting Championship held on August 27, 2016, at Rogers Arena in Vancouver, British Columbia, Canada.

== Background ==
This was the second time a UFC on Fox event was held outside the United States (the first one was UFC on Fox: Gustafsson vs. Johnson, in Sweden, in January 2015) and the first time in Canada.

The event was headlined by a welterweight contest between former WEC Welterweight Champion and former interim UFC Welterweight Champion Carlos Condit and former UFC Middleweight Championship challenger Demian Maia. The bout was scheduled to take place at UFC 202, but was moved a week later to headline this event.

The Ultimate Fighter: China featherweight winner Ning Guangyou was expected to face Marlon Vera at UFC 202. However, due to an out-of-competition failed test and following investigation concluding Ning ingested the substance without fault or negligence, the bout was moved to this event. In turn, the bout was postponed again due to alleged visa issues for Ning, which restricted the timing of his travel.

Josh Emmett was expected to face promotional newcomer Jeremy Kennedy at the event. However, Emmett pulled out of the fight on August 19 with an undisclosed injury. He was replaced by fellow promotional newcomer Alessandro Ricci.

The Ultimate Fighter Nations welterweight winner Chad Laprise missed weight, coming in at 159 lb. As a result, he was fined 20% of his fight purse, which went to his opponent Thibault Gouti. The fight proceeded as scheduled.

A middleweight bout between promotional newcomers Adam Hunter and Ryan Janes was canceled after the weigh-ins, due to a potential USADA (U.S. Anti-Doping Agency) violation stemming from a Hunter's pre-fight out-of-competition drug test. According to a UFC official, Janes was reportedly paid his "show" money.

== Results ==
Main Card (Fox)
Weight class				Method	Round	Time	Notes
Welterweight	Demian Maia	def.	Carlos Condit	Submission (rear-naked choke)	1	1:52
Featherweight	Anthony Pettis	def.	Charles Oliveira	Submission (guillotine choke)	3	1:49
Women's Strawweight	Paige VanZant	def.	Bec Rawlings	KO (jumping switch kick and punches)	2	0:17
Lightweight	Jim Miller	def.	Joe Lauzon	Decision (split) (29–28, 28–29, 29–28)	3	5:00
Preliminary Card (Fox)
Middleweight	Sam Alvey	def.	Kevin Casey	TKO (punches)	2	4:56
Featherweight	Kyle Bochniak	def.	Enrique Barzola	Decision (split) (29–28, 27–30, 29–28)	3	5:00
Middleweight	Alessio Di Chirico	def.	Garreth McLellan	Decision (split) (29–28, 28–29, 29–28)	3	5:00
Lightweight	Felipe Silva	def.	Shane Campbell	TKO (punches)	1	1:13
Preliminary Card (UFC Fight Pass)
Catchweight (159 lb)	Chad Laprise	def.	Thibault Gouti	TKO (punches)	1	1:36
Lightweight	Jeremy Kennedy	def.	Alessandro Ricci	Decision (unanimous) (30–27, 30–27, 29–28)	3	5:00

== Bonus awards ==
The following fighters were awarded $50,000 bonuses:

- Fight of the Night: Jim Miller vs. Joe Lauzon
- Performance of the Night: Demian Maia and Paige VanZant

== See also ==
- List of UFC events
- 2016 in UFC
