= Olivier Aubin-Mercier =

Canadian mixed martial arts fighter

- Born: February 23, 1989 (age 37); Montreal, Quebec, Canada
- Other names: The Canadian Gangster
- Height: 5 ft 9 in (1.75 m)
- Weight: 156 lb (71 kg; 11 st 2 lb)
- Division: Lightweight; Welterweight
- Reach: 71 in (180 cm)
- Stance: Southpaw
- Fighting out of: Montreal, Quebec, Canada
- Team: H2O MMA; Tristar Gym
- Rank: Black belt in Judo; Black belt in Brazilian Jiu-Jitsu; Blue belt in Taekwondo
- Years active: 2011–2023

Mixed martial arts record
- Total: 26
- Wins: 21
- By knockout: 4
- By submission: 8
- By decision: 9
- Losses: 5
- By decision: 5

Other information
- Mixed martial arts record from Sherdog

Olivier Aubin-Mercier (French: [ɔlivje obɛ̃ mɛʁsje]; born February 23, 1989) is a Canadian retired mixed martial artist who competed in the Lightweight division. Fighting from 2011 to 2023, Aubin-Mercier competed for the Professional Fighters League, where he won the 2022 and 2023 PFL Lightweight Championship and as well a 12 bout stint in the UFC where he appeared on The Ultimate Fighter Nations: Canada vs. Australia.

== Background ==
Born and raised in Montreal, Quebec, Aubin-Mercier began learning judo from a young age and was talented, earning a black belt, and was a two-time junior national champion as well as a three time senior national medalist. In addition, Aubin-Mercier also competed for the adult national Canadian team. Aubin-Mercier attended CEGEP for two years studying Multimedia.

== Mixed martial arts career ==
Aubin-Mercier made his professional debut in 2011 and competed in regional promotions across Quebec. He compiled a record of 4 - 0, finishing all of his opponents by submission in the first round before auditioning for The Ultimate Fighter.

=== The Ultimate Fighter: Nations ===
In December 2013, it was announced that Aubin-Mercier would be a cast member on The Ultimate Fighter Nations: Canada vs. Australia, representing Canada at welterweight.

Over the course of the show, Aubin-Mercier first defeated Jake Matthews in the quarterfinals via unanimous decision. In the semifinals, Aubin-Mercier went on to defeat Richard Walsh via submission (rear-naked choke) to reach the finals.

=== Ultimate Fighting Championship ===
Aubin-Mercier made his official debut facing fellow castmate Chad Laprise in the welterweight finals on April 16, 2014 The Ultimate Fighter Nations Finale. Laprise won the fight via split decision.

Aubin-Mercier faced Jake Lindsey in a lightweight bout on October 4, 2014, at UFC Fight Night 54. Aubin-Mercier won the bout via submission in the second round, which also earned him a Performance of the Night bonus.

Aubin-Mercier faced David Michaud on April 25, 2015, at UFC 186. He won the fight via submission in the third round.

Aubin-Mercier was expected to face Chris Wade on August 23, 2015, at UFC Fight Night 74. However, Wade pulled out of the bout in late July after sustaining an injury and was replaced by Tony Sims. He won the fight via unanimous decision.

Aubin-Mercier faced Carlos Diego Ferreira on January 30, 2016, at UFC on Fox 18. He lost the fight by unanimous decision.

Aubin-Mercier next faced Thibault Gouti on June 18, 2016, at UFC Fight Night 89. He won the fight via submission in the third round.

Aubin Mercier faced Drew Dober on December 10, 2016, at UFC 206. He won the fight via submission in the second round.

Aubin-Mercier was expected to face Leonardo Santos on June 3, 2017, at UFC 212. However the bout was scrapped on May 18 as both fighters were removed from the card.

Aubin-Mercier faced Anthony Rocco Martin on September 16, 2017, at UFC Fight Night 116. He won the back-and-forth fight via split decision.

Aubin-Mercier was scheduled to face Gilbert Burns on February 24, 2018, at UFC on Fox 28. However, on February 21, 2018, the bout was scrapped as promotional medical officials deemed Burns would be unsafe to meet lightweight upper limit of 156 Ibs limit upon his arrival at the fight week.

Aubin-Mercier faced Evan Dunham on April 7, 2018, at UFC 223. He won the fight by TKO in the first round. This win earned him a Performance of the Night bonus.

Aubin-Mercier faced Alexander Hernandez on July 28, 2018, at UFC on Fox 30. He lost the fight via unanimous decision.

The bout with Gilbert Burns eventually took place on December 8, 2018, at UFC 231. Aubin-Mercier lost the fight via unanimous decision.

As the last fight of his prevailing contract, Aubin-Mercier faced Arman Tsarukyan on July 27, 2019, at UFC 240. He lost the fight via unanimous decision.

=== Professional Fighters League ===
It was announced on early March, 2020, that Aubin-Mercier signed with Professional Fighters League.

==== 2021 season ====
Aubin-Mercier was expected to make his PFL debut against Joilton Lutterbach on April 23, 2021, at PFL 1. However, in March, he pulled out of the bout due to injury.

Aubin-Mercier faced Marcin Held at PFL 4 on June 10, 2021. He won the fight via unanimous decision, earning his first victory in the promotion.

Aubin-Mercier was scheduled to face Natan Schulte on August 13, 2021, at PFL 7. However on August 4, it was announced that Schulte had to pull out of the matchup and was replaced by Darrell Horcher. At weigh-ins, Horcher weighed in at 159.25 pounds, missing weight by 3.25 pounds. The bout proceeded at catchweight and he was fined 20% of his purse, which went to Aubin-Mercier who won the bout via unanimous decision.

==== 2022 season ====
Aubin-Mercier faced Natan Schulte on April 23, 2022, at PFL 1. He won the close bout via split decision.

Aubin-Mercier faced 2021 PFL Lightweight Champion Raush Manfio on June 17, 2022, at PFL 4. He won the bout via unanimous decision.

Aubin-Mercier faced Alex Martinez in the Semifinals off the Lightweight tournament on August 5, 2022, at PFL 7. He won the bout via unanimous decision.

Aubin-Mercier faced Stevie Ray in the finals of the Lightweight tournament on November 25, 2022, at PFL 10. Aubin-Mercier won the fight by knockout in the second round and won the 2022 PFL Lightweight Tournament.

==== 2023 season ====
Aubin-Mercier started off the 2023 season against Shane Burgos on April 14, 2023, at PFL 3. He won the fight by unanimous decision.

Aubin-Mercier faced debutant Anthony Romero on June 23, 2023 at PFL 6. He won the fight via knee knockout in the third round.

In the semi-finals, Aubin-Mercier faced Bruno Miranda at PFL 9 on August 23, 2023. He won the bout via TKO stoppage at the end of the second round.

In the final, Aubin-Mercier faced Clay Collard on November 24, 2023 at PFL 10. He won the bout by unanimous decision to win his second Lightweight tournament.

After the win, Aubin-Mercier announced his retirement from MMA.

== Championships and accomplishments ==
- Professional Fighters League
  - 2022 PFL Lightweight Championship
  - 2023 PFL Lightweight Championship
- Ultimate Fighting Championship
  - Performance of the Night (Two times) vs. Jake Lindsey and Evan Dunham
  - Fewest significant strikes landed for a win in UFC history (3) (vs. Tony Sims)
- MMA Fighting
  - 2023 Third Team MMA All-Star

== Mixed martial arts record ==
Professional record breakdown
26 matches	21 wins	5 losses
By knockout	4	0
By submission	8	0
By decision	9	5

Res.	Record	Opponent	Method	Event	Date	Round	Time	Location	Notes
Win	21–5	Clay Collard	Decision (unanimous)	PFL 10 (2023)	November 24, 2023	5	5:00	Washington, D.C., United States	Won the 2023 PFL Lightweight Tournament.
Win	20–5	Bruno Miranda	TKO (punches)	PFL 9 (2023)	August 23, 2023	2	4:41	New York City, New York, United States	2023 PFL Lightweight Tournament Semifinal.
Win	19–5	Anthony Romero	KO (knee)	PFL 6 (2023)	June 23, 2023	3	0:28	Atlanta, Georgia, United States	
Win	18–5	Shane Burgos	Decision (unanimous)	PFL 3 (2023)	April 14, 2023	3	5:00	Las Vegas, Nevada, United States	
Win	17–5	Stevie Ray	KO (punch)	PFL 10 (2022)	November 25, 2022	2	4:40	New York City, New York, United States	Won the 2022 PFL Lightweight Tournament.
Win	16–5	Alex Martinez	Decision (unanimous)	PFL 7 (2022)	August 5, 2022	3	5:00	New York City, New York, United States	2022 PFL Lightweight Tournament Semifinal.
Win	15–5	Raush Manfio	Decision (unanimous)	PFL 4 (2022)	June 17, 2022	3	5:00	Atlanta, Georgia, United States	
Win	14–5	Natan Schulte	Decision (split)	PFL 1 (2022)	April 20, 2022	3	5:00	Arlington, Texas, United States	
Win	13–5	Darrell Horcher	Decision (unanimous)	PFL 7 (2021)	August 13, 2021	3	5:00	Hollywood, Florida, United States	Catchweight (159.25 lb) bout; Horcher missed weight.
Win	12–5	Marcin Held	Decision (unanimous)	PFL 4 (2021)	June 10, 2021	3	5:00	Atlantic City, New Jersey, United States	
Loss	11–5	Arman Tsarukyan	Decision (unanimous)	UFC 240	July 27, 2019	3	5:00	Edmonton, Alberta, Canada	
Loss	11–4	Gilbert Burns	Decision (unanimous)	UFC 231	December 8, 2018	3	5:00	Toronto, Ontario, Canada	
Loss	11–3	Alexander Hernandez	Decision (unanimous)	UFC on Fox: Alvarez vs. Poirier 2	July 28, 2018	3	5:00	Calgary, Alberta, Canada	
Win	11–2	Evan Dunham	TKO (knee and punches)	UFC 223	April 7, 2018	1	0:53	Brooklyn, New York, United States	Performance of the Night.
Win	10–2	Anthony Rocco Martin	Decision (split)	UFC Fight Night: Rockhold vs. Branch	September 16, 2017	3	5:00	Pittsburgh, Pennsylvania, United States	
Win	9–2	Drew Dober	Submission (rear-naked choke)	UFC 206	December 10, 2016	2	2:57	Toronto, Ontario, Canada	
Win	8–2	Thibault Gouti	Submission (rear-naked choke)	UFC Fight Night: MacDonald vs. Thompson	June 18, 2016	3	2:28	Ottawa, Ontario, Canada	
Loss	7–2	Carlos Diego Ferreira	Decision (unanimous)	UFC on Fox: Johnson vs. Bader	January 30, 2016	3	5:00	Newark, New Jersey, United States	
Win	7–1	Tony Sims	Decision (unanimous)	UFC Fight Night: Holloway vs. Oliveira	August 23, 2015	3	5:00	Saskatoon, Saskatchewan, Canada	
Win	6–1	David Michaud	Submission (rear-naked choke)	UFC 186	April 25, 2015	3	3:24	Montreal, Quebec, Canada	
Win	5–1	Jake Lindsey	Submission (inverted triangle kimura)	UFC Fight Night: MacDonald vs. Saffiedine	October 4, 2014	2	3:22	Halifax, Nova Scotia, Canada	Return to Lightweight. Performance of the Night.
Loss	4–1	Chad Laprise	Decision (split)	The Ultimate Fighter Nations Finale: Bisping vs. Kennedy	April 16, 2014	3	5:00	Quebec City, Quebec, Canada	Welterweight debut. The Ultimate Fighter Nations: Canada vs. Australia Welterweight Tournament Final.
Win	4–0	Jason Meisel	Submission (rear-naked choke)	Challenge MMA 22	August 17, 2013	1	1:38	Montreal, Quebec, Canada	
Win	3–0	Jordan Jewell	Submission (rear-naked choke)	Slamm 1	November 30, 2012	1	1:53	Montreal, Quebec, Canada	
Win	2–0	Daniel Ireland	Submission (rear-naked choke)	Ringside MMA 13	March 17, 2012	1	1:10	Montreal, Quebec, Canada	
Win	1–0	Teoscar Hernandez	Submission (rear-naked choke)	Ringside MMA 12	October 21, 2011	1	0:58	Montreal, Quebec, Canada	Lightweight debut.

=== Mixed martial arts exhibition record ===
Professional record breakdown
2 matches	2 wins	0 losses
By submission	1	0
By decision	1	0

Res.	Record	Opponent	Method	Event	Date	Round	Time	Location	Notes
Win	2–0	Richard Walsh	Submission (rear-naked choke)	The Ultimate Fighter Nations: Canada vs. Australia	April 2, 2014 (airdate)	1	N/A	Quebec City, Quebec, Canada	Semifinals.
Win	1–0	Jake Matthews	Decision (unanimous)	The Ultimate Fighter Nations: Canada vs. Australia	February 27, 2014 (airdate)	2	5:00	Quebec City, Quebec, Canada	Quarterfinals.

== See also ==
- List of male mixed martial artists
- List of Canadian UFC fighters
