= Elias Theodorou =

Canadian mixed martial artist (1988–2022)

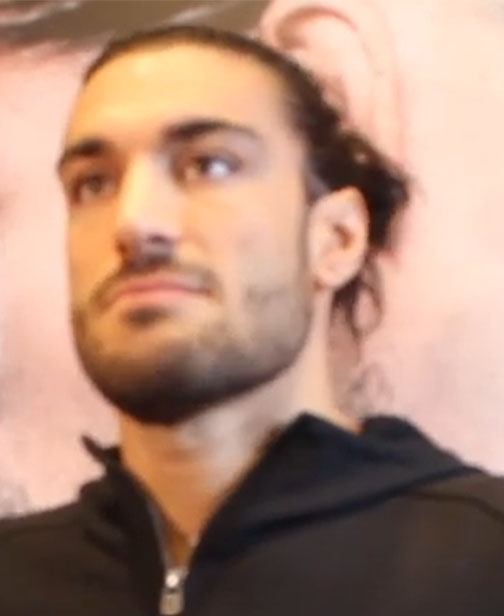
- Theodorou at UFC 231
- Born: May 31, 1988; Mississauga, Ontario, Canada
- Died: September 11, 2022 (aged 34); Woodbridge, Ontario, Canada
- Other names: The Spartan
- Height: 6 ft 1 in (1.85 m)
- Weight: 185 lb (84 kg; 13.2 st)
- Division: Middleweight
- Reach: 75 1/2 in (192 cm)
- Stance: Orthodox
- Fighting out of: Toronto, Ontario, Canada
- Team: Grants MMA; Tapout Burlington; Tristar Gym
- Rank: Black belt in Brazilian Jiu-Jitsu; Dark blue belt in Muay Thai
- Years active: 2011–2022

Mixed martial arts record
- Total: 22
- Wins: 19
- By knockout: 8
- By submission: 1
- By decision: 10
- Losses: 3
- By decision: 3

Other information
- Website: https://www.eliastheodorou.com/
- Mixed martial arts record from Sherdog

Elias Theodorou (May 31, 1988 – September 11, 2022) was a Canadian mixed martial artist. He competed for the UFC in the Middleweight division where he was ranked 13th until his release, and won The Ultimate Fighter Nations: Canada vs. Australia. He became the first professional athlete to receive a therapeutic use exemption for cannabis in North America in January 2020.

== Background ==
Theodorou was born and raised in Mississauga, Ontario, of Greek descent, and attended Meadowvale Secondary School. He went to Humber College to earn a B.A Degree in Creative Advertising, but after Theodorou's first year in college, he chose to take MMA classes as a workout before opting to pursue MMA as a career. On February 19, 2020, Theodorou was the first MMA fighter and professional athlete in history to receive a sanctioned exemption for medical cannabis (TUE) in sport by a governing body via the British Columbia Athletic Commission.

== Mixed martial arts career ==
=== The Ultimate Fighter ===
In December 2013, it was announced that Theodorou would be a cast member on The Ultimate Fighter Nations: Canada vs. Australia, representing Canada at Middleweight. He defeated Zein Saliba in the Quarterfinals and defeated Tyler Manawaroa in the semifinals. After semifinals, he went to Phuket Province, Thailand, to train at Tiger Muay Thai with coach Patrick Côté.

=== Ultimate Fighting Championship ===
Theodorou defeated MFC vet Sheldon Westcott via TKO due to punches and elbows in the second round at The Ultimate Fighter Nations Finale to win the Middleweight tournament.

Theodorou faced Bruno Santos on October 4, 2014 at UFC Fight Night 54. He won the fight via unanimous decision.

Theodorou faced Roger Narvaez on March 14, 2015 at UFC 185. After a first round in which Narvaez seemed to control, Narvaez suffered a broken arm in the second round after an attempt to block a kick from Theodorou. Subsequently, Theodorou was able to get a TKO stoppage with a flurry of punches shortly thereafter.

Theodorou faced Thiago Santos on December 10, 2015 at UFC Fight Night 80. He lost the fight by unanimous decision.

Theodorou next faced Sam Alvey June 18, 2016 at UFC Fight Night 89. The bout remained on the feet for nearly all of its duration in a largely uneventful fight where neither fighter was able to deliver any significant offense. He won the fight via unanimous decision.

Theodorou faced Cezar Ferreira on February 19, 2017 at UFC Fight Night 105. He won the fight via a controversial unanimous decision.

Theodorou faced Brad Tavares on July 7, 2017 at The Ultimate Fighter 25 Finale. He lost the fight by unanimous decision.

Theodorou faced Dan Kelly on November 19, 2017 at UFC Fight Night 121. He won via unanimous decision.

Theodorou faced Trevor Smith on May 27, 2018 at UFC Fight Night 130. He won the fight via unanimous decision.

Theodorou was expected to face Antônio Carlos Júnior on September 22, 2018, at UFC Fight Night 137. However, Júnior pulled out on August 28 due to injury. The pairing was expected to be left intact and rescheduled for December 8, 2018, at UFC 231. On September 13, 2018, it was reported that Júnior was forced to withdraw from his bout with Theodorou yet again, citing a surgery is required on the injury that caused the cancellation of his first scheduled bout with Theodorou. On October 1, 2018, it was reported Júnior was replaced by Eryk Anders. Theodorou won the fight via a highly controversial split decision.

Theodorou faced Derek Brunson on May 4, 2019, at UFC Fight Night 151. He lost the fight by unanimous decision.

On May 26, 2019 it was reported that Theodorou was released by the UFC.

=== Post-UFC career ===
At the first bout after UFC release, Theodorou fought Hernani Perpetuo at Prospect Fighting Championships 12 on December 6, 2019. He won the fight in the third round via TKO.

Theodorou faced fellow UFC veteran Matt Dwyer at Rise FC 6 on March 13, 2021. He won the fight via third-round technical knockout.

Theodorou faced Bryan Baker on December 18, 2021 at Colorado Combat Club 10. He won the bout via unanimous decision.

== Other ventures ==
Theodorou and his ex-girlfriend, Max Altamuro, a retail manager living and working in Toronto, competed on the third season of The Amazing Race Canada. They placed 12th in their current home city of Toronto and were the first team to be eliminated from the race. Theodorou also served as a "ring boy" for the all-female MMA promotion Invicta Fighting Championships.

On July 18, 2015 Theodorou wrestled his only professional wrestling match defeating Kris Chambers at Superkick'D King Of The 6IX event in Toronto.

Theodorou was involved in an upcoming film called Last Hit in which he will portray an MMA fighter who is forced to retire but then takes up e-sports.

Theodorou was a proud medical cannabis activist and received a therapeutic use exemption (TUE) from the British Columbia Athletic Commission in January 2020, making him the first professional athlete in North America to be sanctioned to utilize cannabis in-sport. In May 2021 he received a second such exemption from the Colorado Combative Sports Commission, making him the first professional athlete to receive a TUE in the United States. Theodorou used cannabis to treat the pain and discomfort from bilateral neuropathy, a nerve condition resulting from an accident that broke his hand in two places and fractured it in four.

== Death ==
Theodorou died from stage four colon cancer that metastasized to the liver on September 11, 2022, at the age of 34. He had the disease for some time, but it was kept private from the public until his death.

== Championships and awards ==
- Extreme Cage Combat
  - ECC Middleweight Championship (One time)
- North American Allied Fight Series
  - NAAFS Middleweight Championship (One time)
- Ultimate Fighting Championship
  - The Ultimate Fighter Nations Middleweight Tournament Winner
  - UFC.com Awards
    - 2014: Ranked #6 Newcomer of the Year

== Mixed martial arts record ==
Professional record breakdown
22 matches	19 wins	3 losses
By knockout	8	0
By submission	1	0
By decision	10	3

Res.	Record	Opponent	Method	Event	Date	Round	Time	Location	Notes
Win	19–3	Bryan Baker	Decision (unanimous)	Colorado Combat Club 10	December 18, 2021	3	5:00	Greeley, Colorado, United States	
Win	18–3	Matt Dwyer	TKO (punches)	Rise FC 6: Fighting the Stigma	March 13, 2021	3	1:20	Victoria, British Columbia, Canada	
Win	17–3	Hernani Perpetuo	TKO (elbows)	PFC 12: Laramie vs. Cruz	December 6, 2019	3	1:51	Windsor, Ontario, Canada	
Loss	16–3	Derek Brunson	Decision (unanimous)	UFC Fight Night: Iaquinta vs. Cowboy	May 4, 2019	3	5:00	Ottawa, Ontario, Canada	
Win	16–2	Eryk Anders	Decision (split)	UFC 231	December 8, 2018	3	5:00	Toronto, Ontario, Canada	
Win	15–2	Trevor Smith	Decision (unanimous)	UFC Fight Night: Thompson vs. Till	May 27, 2018	3	5:00	Liverpool, England	
Win	14–2	Dan Kelly	Decision (unanimous)	UFC Fight Night: Werdum vs. Tybura	November 19, 2017	3	5:00	Sydney, Australia	
Loss	13–2	Brad Tavares	Decision (unanimous)	The Ultimate Fighter: Redemption Finale	July 7, 2017	3	5:00	Las Vegas, Nevada, United States	
Win	13–1	Cezar Ferreira	Decision (unanimous)	UFC Fight Night: Lewis vs. Browne	February 19, 2017	3	5:00	Halifax, Nova Scotia, Canada	
Win	12–1	Sam Alvey	Decision (unanimous)	UFC Fight Night: MacDonald vs. Thompson	June 18, 2016	3	5:00	Ottawa, Ontario, Canada	
Loss	11–1	Thiago Santos	Decision (unanimous)	UFC Fight Night: Namajunas vs. VanZant	December 10, 2015	3	5:00	Las Vegas, Nevada, United States	
Win	11–0	Roger Narvaez	TKO (punches)	UFC 185	March 14, 2015	2	4:07	Dallas, Texas, United States	
Win	10–0	Bruno Santos	Decision (unanimous)	UFC Fight Night: MacDonald vs. Saffiedine	October 4, 2014	3	5:00	Halifax, Nova Scotia, Canada	
Win	9–0	Sheldon Westcott	TKO (punches and elbows)	The Ultimate Fighter Nations Finale: Bisping vs. Kennedy	April 16, 2014	2	4:41	Quebec City, Quebec, Canada	Won The Ultimate Fighter: Nations Middleweight Tournament.
Win	8–0	Travis Clark	TKO (retirement)	NAAFS: Rock N Rumble 7	July 20, 2013	2	5:00	Cleveland, Ohio, United States	Won the NAAFS Middleweight Championship.
Win	7–0	Mike Kent	Submission (punches)	ECC 17: Rise of Champions	May 11, 2013	1	1:54	Halifax, Nova Scotia, Canada	Won the vacant ECC Middleweight Championship.
Win	6–0	Ali Mokdad	Decision (unanimous)	Score Fighting Series 7	November 23, 2012	3	5:00	Hamilton, Ontario, Canada	
Win	5–0	Simon Marini	Decision (unanimous)	Score Fighting Series 5	August 25, 2012	3	5:00	Hamilton, Ontario, Canada	
Win	4–0	Rich Lictawa	TKO (retirement)	Bellator 64	April 6, 2012	3	0:33	Windsor, Ontario, Canada	Catchweight (190 lbs) bout.
Win	3–0	Erik Herbert	Decision (unanimous)	Score Fighting Series 4	March 16, 2012	3	5:00	Hamilton, Ontario, Canada	
Win	2–0	Steve Hodgson	Submission (rear-naked choke)	HKFC: School of Hard Knocks 14	September 23, 2011	2	1:12	Calgary, Alberta, Canada	
Win	1–0	Tanner Tolman	TKO (punches and elbows)	HKFC: School of Hard Knocks 12	June 17, 2011	1	3:49	Calgary, Alberta, Canada	

=== Mixed martial arts exhibition record ===
Exhibition record breakdown		
2 matches	2 wins	0 losses
By knockout	0	0
By submission	0	0
By decision	2	0

Res.	Record	Opponent	Method	Event	Date	Round	Time	Location	Notes
Win	2–0	Tyler Manawaroa	Decision (majority)	The Ultimate Fighter Nations: Canada vs. Australia	February 26, 2014	2		Quebec City, Quebec, Canada	Semi-finals
Win	1–0	Zein Saliba	Decision (majority)	The Ultimate Fighter Nations: Canada vs. Australia	January 22, 2014	2		Quebec City, Quebec, Canada	Quarter-finals

== Filmography ==
Television
Year	Title	Role	Notes
2013	The Listener	Scotty Furmanek	
2014	The Ultimate Fighter Nations	Himself	
2015	The Amazing Race Canada	Himself	Season 3

== See also ==
- List of Bellator MMA alumni
- List of male mixed martial artists
- List of Canadian UFC fighters
- Cannabis and sports
