= Abel Trujillo =

American mixed martial artist (born 1986)

Abel Nazario Trujillo
- Born: September 18, 1983 (age 43); Greensboro, North Carolina, U.S.
- Other names: Killa
- Height: 5 ft 8 in (1.73 m)
- Weight: 156 lb (71 kg; 11.1 st)
- Division: Lightweight
- Reach: 70 in (178 cm)
- Fighting out of: Colorado, U.S.
- Team: Blackzilians
- Wrestling: NAIA Wrestling
- Years active: 2009–present

Mixed martial arts record
- Total: 24
- Wins: 15
- By knockout: 5
- By submission: 4
- By decision: 5
- By disqualification: 1
- Losses: 8
- By knockout: 1
- By submission: 4
- By decision: 3
- No contests: 1

Amateur record
- Total: 2
- Wins: 1
- By submission: 1
- Losses: 1
- By knockout: 1

Other information
- Mixed martial arts record from Sherdog

Abel Nazario Trujillo (born September 18, 1983) is an American mixed martial artist. He last competed in the lightweight division of the Ultimate Fighting Championship (UFC).

== Background ==
Born in Greensboro, North Carolina, Trujillo attended Riverside High School in Durham, North Carolina where he competed in wrestling. Trujillo won the 2002 NCHSAA 4A 145-pound wrestling state championship. He also helped his team win the 2002 NCHSAA 4A state tournament championship. Trujillo wrestled collegiately at William Penn University in Oskaloosa, Iowa. During his college career, he was a four-time NAIA All-American.

== Mixed martial arts career ==
=== Early career ===
Trujillo lost by knockout against future World Extreme Cagefighting competitor Zach Micklewright in his amateur debut, on July 22, 2006. Almost three years later, he rebounded and won his next amateur bout by submission in just 54 seconds.

Trujillo made his professional MMA debut in 2009, losing via armbar to Ted Wothington. He went 5–3 in his next eight fights, before winning four straight over Lucas Gwaltney, Andre Garcia, James Edson Berto and Frank Carrillo in less than a year.

=== Ultimate Fighting Championship ===
In the summer of 2012, Trujillo was signed by the UFC on the strength of a four-fight win streak. He was expected to make his promotional debut on September 1, 2012, at UFC 151 against Tim Means. However, after UFC 151 was cancelled, Trujillo/Means was rescheduled for UFC on Fox: Henderson vs. Diaz on December 8, 2012. Then on the day of the weigh in for the event, Means was forced out of the bout after sustaining a head injury caused by a fall in a hotel sauna and was replaced by Marcus LeVesseur. Trujillo was successful in his debut, defeating LeVesseur via TKO (knees to the body) at 3:56 of the second round. In the fight, he successfully connected on 57 of his 75 significant strikes and also defended eight of his opponent's ten takedown attempts.

Trujillo faced Khabib Nurmagomedov on May 25, 2013, at UFC 160. He lost the fight by unanimous decision. A fight in which Trujillo was taken down a record 21 times, breaking a record once held by former lightweight champion Sean Sherk. However, it's worth noting that Trujillo also secured a take down on Nurmagomedov, making him the only fighter to ever take Nurmagomedov down in his 29-fight MMA career.

Trujillo faced Roger Bowling on August 28, 2013, at UFC Fight Night 27. The fight ended in controversial fashion as Trujillo landed what appeared to be an illegal knee to the face of Bowling at the end of round two. With Bowling unable to continue, the referee deemed the bout a no contest.

A rematch with Bowling took place on December 14, 2013, at UFC on Fox 9. Trujillo won via TKO in the second round.

Trujillo was expected to face Bobby Green on February 1, 2014, at UFC 169. However, Green pulled out of the bout for undisclosed reasons and was replaced by Jamie Varner. Trujillo won the back-and-forth fight via knockout in the second round. The win also earned him Fight of the Night and Knockout of the Night bonus awards totaling $125,000. The win also earned Trujillo his first knockout and fight of the night awards and with this win became the first man to stop Varner by KO.

Trujillo was expected to face Myles Jury on June 28, 2014, at UFC Fight Night 44. However, Jury pulled out of the bout with an injury and was replaced by Frank Trevino. Then on June 8, Trevino pulled out of the bout with an injury and Trujillo was removed from the event entirely.

A bout with Bobby Green was expected to take place on August 2, 2014, at UFC 176. However, after UFC 176 was cancelled, Green/Trujillo was rescheduled and was then expected to take place on August 16, 2014, at UFC Fight Night 47. However, Green was removed from his fight on July 11 as he stepped in as an injury replacement for Michael Johnson against Josh Thomson at UFC on Fox: Lawler vs. Brown on July 26, 2014. Trujillo was expected to face Ross Pearson at the event. However, on August 4, he pulled out of the bout due to injury.

Trujillo faced Tony Ferguson on December 6, 2014, at UFC 181. Despite winning the first round, Trujillo lost the fight via submission in the second round.

Trujillo was expected to face John Makdessi on April 25, 2015, at UFC 186. However, on April 1, it was announced that Trujillo had pulled out of the fight citing an injury and was replaced by promotional newcomer Shane Campbell.

Trujillo faced Gleison Tibau at UFC Fight Night 77 on November 7, 2015. He lost the fight via submission in the first round. Tibau had taken Trujillo's back, secured a body triangle from the bottom and secured a rear-naked choke grip with his arm underneath Trujillo's chin. After a few seconds in this position, referee Keith Peterson halted the contest as he believed that Trujillo was unconscious when in fact he was not. Trujillo indicated that he planned to appeal the decision in hopes that the result may be changed to a No Contest by the Brazilian MMA Athletic Commission (CABMMA). Subsequently, on December 23, 2015, it was reported that Tibau had failed an in-competition test following the win over Trujillo. On February 18, 2016, Tibau was suspended for 2 years by USADA and as a result the loss was reversed to a win for Trujillo.

Trujillo faced Tony Sims on January 2, 2015, at UFC 195. He won the fight via submission in the first round.

Trujillo was expected to face Ross Pearson on March 20, 2016, at UFC Fight Night 85. However, Trujillo was removed from the card on March 12 due to alleged visa issues which restricted his entry to Australia. As a result, Pearson faced Chad Laprise.

Trujillo was expected to face Carlos Diego Ferreira on May 29, 2016, at UFC Fight Night 88. However, Ferreira was removed from the fight on May 13 after it was announced that he had been flagged for a potential anti-doping policy violation. He was replaced by promotional newcomer Jordan Rinaldi. Trujillo won the fight via unanimous decision.

Trujillo was expected to face Evan Dunham on September 17, 2016, at UFC Fight Night 94. However, Trujillo pulled out of the fight on September 5, citing an undisclosed injury and was replaced by former WSOF Featherweight Champion and promotional newcomer Rick Glenn.

The bout with Dunham was rescheduled and was expected to take place on February 4, 2017, at UFC Fight Night 104. However, on January 19, Dunham pulled out of the fight with an injury and was replaced by James Vick. He lost the fight via submission in the third round.

Trujillo was expected to face Lando Vannata on October 7, 2017, at UFC 216. However, Trujillo was removed from the card on August 14 for undisclosed reasons and replaced by Bobby Green.

Trujillo faced John Makdessi on December 16, 2017, at UFC on Fox 26. He lost the fight by unanimous decision.

=== Post-UFC career ===
Trujillo was expected to face Will Brooks at Battlefield FC 2 on July 27, 2019, but withdrew from the bout and was replaced by Gleison Tibau.

== Personal life ==
=== Domestic abuse ===
Trujillo has twice plead guilty to charges of domestic abuse; in both cases the incidents involved the mother of his child.

=== Sexual exploitation of a child ===
On July 16, 2019, he was charged with the sexual exploitation of a child, and on March 6, 2020 Trujillo pleaded guilty to promoting obscenity. His sentencing was scheduled for April 6, 2020. Trujillo was sentenced to two years of probation on August 31, 2020.

== Championships and accomplishments ==
=== Mixed martial arts ===
- Ultimate Fighting Championship
  - Fight of the Night (One time)
  - Knockout of the Night (One time)
  - UFC.com Awards
    - 2014: Ranked #5 Fight of the Year & Ranked #10 Knockout of the Year vs. Jamie Varner
- Bleacher Report
  - 2014 #5 Ranked Fight of the Year vs. Jamie Varner at UFC 169
- MMA Junkie
  - 2014 February Knockout of the Month vs. Jamie Varner

=== Amateur wrestling ===
- National Association of Intercollegiate Athletics
  - NAIA All-American out of William Penn University (2004, 2005, 2006, 2007)
- North Carolina High School Athletic Association
  - North Carolina 4A 140 lb State Champion out of Riverside High School (2002)

== Mixed martial arts record ==
Professional record breakdown
24 matches	15 wins	8 losses
By knockout	5	1
By submission	4	4
By decision	5	3
By disqualification	1	0
No contests	1	

Res.	Record	Opponent	Method	Event	Date	Round	Time	Location	Notes
Loss	15–8 (1)	John Makdessi	Decision (unanimous)	UFC on Fox: Lawler vs. dos Anjos	December 16, 2017	3	5:00	Winnipeg, Manitoba, Canada	
Loss	15–7 (1)	James Vick	Submission (D'Arce choke)	UFC Fight Night: Bermudez vs. The Korean Zombie	February 4, 2017	3	0:49	Houston, Texas, United States	
Win	15–6 (1)	Jordan Rinaldi	Decision (unanimous)	UFC Fight Night: Almeida vs. Garbrandt	May 29, 2016	3	5:00	Las Vegas, Nevada, United States	
Win	14–6 (1)	Tony Sims	Submission (guillotine choke)	UFC 195	January 2, 2016	1	3:18	Las Vegas, Nevada, United States	
Win	13–6 (1)	Gleison Tibau	DQ (overturned)	UFC Fight Night: Belfort vs. Henderson 3	November 7, 2015	1	1:45	São Paulo, Brazil	Originally a technical submission (rear-naked choke) win for Tibau; overturned after he tested positive for erythropoietin.
Loss	12–6 (1)	Tony Ferguson	Submission (rear-naked choke)	UFC 181	December 6, 2014	2	4:19	Las Vegas, Nevada, United States	
Win	12–5 (1)	Jamie Varner	KO (punch)	UFC 169	February 1, 2014	2	2:32	Newark, New Jersey, United States	Knockout of the Night. Fight of the Night.
Win	11–5 (1)	Roger Bowling	TKO (punches)	UFC on Fox: Johnson vs. Benavidez 2	December 14, 2013	2	1:35	Sacramento, California, United States	
NC	10–5 (1)	Roger Bowling	NC (illegal knee)	UFC Fight Night: Condit vs. Kampmann 2	August 28, 2013	2	4:57	Indianapolis, Indiana, United States	Bowling was rendered unable to continue.
Loss	10–5	Khabib Nurmagomedov	Decision (unanimous)	UFC 160	May 25, 2013	3	5:00	Las Vegas, Nevada, United States	
Win	10–4	Marcus LeVesseur	TKO (knees to the body)	UFC on Fox: Henderson vs. Diaz	December 8, 2012	2	3:56	Seattle, Washington, United States	
Win	9–4	Frank Carrillo	Decision (unanimous)	CFA 7: Never Give Up	June 30, 2012	3	5:00	Coral Gables, Florida, United States	
Win	8–4	James Edson Berto	Submission (punches)	CFA 6: Palomino vs. Warfield	April 13, 2012	1	1:10	Coral Gables, Florida, United States	
Win	7–4	Andre Garcia	Decision (unanimous)	C3 Fights: Slamfest	January 21, 2012	3	5:00	Newkirk, Oklahoma, United States	
Win	6–4	Lucas Gwaltney	Decision (unanimous)	Fight Me MMA: Trujillo vs. Gwaltney	August 13, 2011	3	5:00	St. Charles, Missouri, United States	
Loss	5–4	Alonzo Martinez	Submission (guillotine choke)	Extreme Challenge 181	April 15, 2011	1	3:30	Council Bluffs, Iowa, United States	
Loss	5–3	Scott Cleve	Decision (split)	Extreme Beatdown at 4 Bears 8	March 12, 2011	3	5:00	New Town, North Dakota, United States	
Win	5–2	Marcos Marquez	Decision (unanimous)	Extreme Challenge: Bad Blood	February 11, 2011	3	5:00	Council Bluffs, Iowa, United States	
Win	4–2	Andre Garcia	Submission (guillotine choke)	Xtreme Fight Promotions: The Holiday Fight Fest	December 4, 2010	1	2:36	Wilmington, North Carolina, United States	
Win	3–2	Wes Clark	Submission (punches)	TriState Cage Fights	October 23, 2010	1	2:01	Lincoln, Nebraska, United States	
Win	2–2	Dave Lehr Cochran	KO (punches)	Fight Me MMA 1: The Battle Begins	August 14, 2010	1	1:29	St. Charles, Missouri, United States	
Loss	1–2	Clayton Robinson	TKO (punches)	C3 Fights: Knockout-Rockout Weekend 4	July 17, 2010	1	2:47	Clinton, Oklahoma, United States	
Win	1–1	Dustin Praxedes	TKO (punches)	Xtreme Promotions: Throwdown in Jamestown 2	March 6, 2010	1	4:15	Sequim, Washington, United States	
Loss	0–1	Ted Worthington	Submission (armbar)	Max FightsDM: Ballroom Brawl 2	August 28, 2009	1	3:06	Des Moines, Iowa, United States	

== Amateur mixed martial arts record ==
Professional record breakdown
2 matches	1 win	1 loss
By knockout	0	1
By submission	1	0
By decision	0	0

Res.	Record	Opponent	Method	Event	Date	Round	Time	Location	Notes
Win	1–1	Randy Meade	Submission (guillotine choke)	Extreme Challenge 127	April 25, 2009	1	0:54	Iowa, United States	
Loss	0–1	Zach Micklewright	KO	Extreme Challenge 69	July 22, 2006	2	0:28	Davenport, Iowa, United States	

== Personal life ==
=== Domestic abuse ===
Trujillo has twice pleaded guilty to charges of domestic abuse; in both cases the incidents involved the mother of his child.

=== Sexual exploitation of a child ===
On July 16, 2019, he was charged with the sexual exploitation of a child, and on March 6, 2020, Trujillo pleaded guilty to promoting obscenity. Trujillo was sentenced to two years of probation on August 31, 2020.

== See also ==
- List of current UFC fighters
- List of male mixed martial artists
