= Chad Laprise =

Canadian mixed martial arts fighter

- Born: July 23, 1986 (age 40); Chatham-Kent, Ontario, Canada
- Other names: The Disciple
- Height: 5 ft 10 in (1.78 m)
- Weight: 170 lb (77 kg; 12 st)
- Division: Lightweight; Welterweight
- Reach: 71 in (180 cm)
- Fighting out of: London, Ontario, Canada
- Team: Adrenaline Training Center; Tristar Gym
- Rank: Purple belt in Brazilian Jiu-Jitsu under Firas Zahabi
- Years active: 2010-2018

Mixed martial arts record
- Total: 17
- Wins: 13
- By knockout: 7
- By submission: 1
- By decision: 5
- Losses: 4
- By knockout: 3
- By decision: 1

Other information
- Mixed martial arts record from Sherdog

Chad Laprise (born July 23, 1986) is a retired Canadian professional mixed martial artist who competed for the UFC in the Welterweight division. A professional competitor since 2010, Laprise won The Ultimate Fighter Nations: Canada vs. Australia, and has also formerly competed for Bellator MMA.

== Mixed martial arts career ==
=== Early career ===
Laprise began his professional MMA career in June 2010 in his native Canada. In his first year fighting, he amassed a record of 4–0, with all of the wins coming via TKO in the first round.

=== Bellator MMA ===
Laprise fought for the Bellator MMA promotion twice in 2012. He defeated Josh Taveirne by submission in the first round at Bellator 64 in April and then returned to defeat Ainsley Robinson by decision at Bellator 76 in October.

=== The Ultimate Fighter: Nations ===
In December 2013, it was announced that Laprise would be a cast member on The Ultimate Fighter Nations: Canada vs. Australia, representing Canada at welterweight. On the show, Laprise first defeated Chris Indich via decision and Kajan Johnson via second round knockout. Laprise won the show by defeating Olivier Aubin-Mercier by split decision at The Ultimate Fighter Nations Finale. He was also the recipient of bonus awards for Fight of the Season and Performance of the Season.

=== Ultimate Fighting Championship ===
Laprise faced Yosdenis Cedeno in a lightweight bout on October 4, 2014, at UFC Fight Night 54. He won the fight via unanimous decision.

Laprise next faced Bryan Barberena on April 25, 2015, at UFC 186. Laprise won the fight by unanimous decision. The win also earned Laprise his first Fight of the Night bonus award.

Laprise faced Francisco Trinaldo on August 23, 2015, at UFC Fight Night 74. Laprise lost the fight via TKO in the first round.

Laprise was expected to face Alan Patrick on March 20, 2016, at UFC Fight Night 85. However, Laprise faced Ross Pearson at the event after Pearson's initial opponent Abel Trujillo was removed from their fight due to alleged visa issues restricting his travel to Australia. Patrick remained on the card against promotional newcomer Damien Brown. Laprise lost the fight via split decision.

Laprise faced Thibault Gouti on August 27, 2016, at UFC on Fox 21. Laprise missed weight for the fight, coming in four pounds heavy. He won the fight via TKO in the first round.

Laprise was expected to face Li Jingliang in a welterweight bout on December 10, 2016, at UFC 206. However, Laprise pulled out of the fight on November 16 citing an undisclosed injury.

Laprise faced Brian Camozzi on July 8, 2017, at UFC 213. He won the fight via TKO in the third round. He also earned the Performance of the Night award for the win.

Laprise faced Galore Bofando on December 16, 2017, at UFC on Fox: Lawler vs. dos Anjos. He won the fight via technical knock out in the first round.

Laprise faced Vicente Luque on May 19, 2018, at UFC Fight Night 129. He lost the fight via knockout in the first round.

Laprise faced Dhiego Lima on December 8, 2018, at UFC 231. He lost the fight via knockout in the first round.

In March 2020, Laprise was released by the UFC.

== Championships and awards ==
- Ultimate Fighting Championship
  - The Ultimate Fighter Nations: Canada vs. Australia Fight of the Season
  - The Ultimate Fighter Nations: Canada vs. Australia Performance of the Season
  - The Ultimate Fighter Nations Welterweight Tournament Winner
  - Fight of the Night (One time) vs. Bryan Barberena
  - Performance of the Night (One time) vs. Brian Camozzi

== Mixed martial arts record ==
Professional record breakdown
17 matches	13 wins	4 losses
By knockout	7	3
By submission	1	0
By decision	5	1

Res.	Record	Opponent	Method	Event	Date	Round	Time	Location	Notes
Loss	13–4	Dhiego Lima	KO (punch)	UFC 231	December 8, 2018	1	1:37	Toronto, Ontario, Canada	
Loss	13–3	Vicente Luque	KO (punches)	UFC Fight Night: Maia vs. Usman	May 19, 2018	1	4:16	Santiago, Chile	
Win	13–2	Galore Bofando	TKO (punches)	UFC on Fox: Lawler vs. dos Anjos	December 16, 2017	1	4:10	Winnipeg, Manitoba, Canada	
Win	12–2	Brian Camozzi	TKO (punches and elbows)	UFC 213	July 8, 2017	3	1:27	Las Vegas, Nevada, United States	Return to Welterweight. Performance of the Night.
Win	11–2	Thibault Gouti	TKO (punches)	UFC on Fox: Maia vs. Condit	August 27, 2016	1	1:36	Vancouver, British Columbia, Canada	Catchweight (159 lbs) bout; Laprise missed weight.
Loss	10–2	Ross Pearson	Decision (split)	UFC Fight Night: Hunt vs. Mir	March 20, 2016	3	5:00	Brisbane, Australia	
Loss	10–1	Francisco Trinaldo	TKO (punches)	UFC Fight Night: Holloway vs. Oliveira	August 23, 2015	1	2:43	Saskatoon, Saskatchewan, Canada	
Win	10–0	Bryan Barberena	Decision (unanimous)	UFC 186	April 25, 2015	3	5:00	Montreal, Quebec, Canada	Fight of the Night.
Win	9–0	Yosdenis Cedeno	Decision (unanimous)	UFC Fight Night: MacDonald vs. Saffiedine	October 4, 2014	3	5:00	Halifax, Nova Scotia, Canada	Return to Lightweight.
Win	8–0	Olivier Aubin-Mercier	Decision (split)	The Ultimate Fighter Nations Finale: Bisping vs. Kennedy	April 16, 2014	3	5:00	Quebec City, Quebec, Canada	Won The Ultimate Fighter Nations Welterweight Tournament.
Win	7–0	Derek Boyle	Decision (unanimous)	XFFC 2: East vs. West	July 20, 2013	3	5:00	Grand Prairie, Alberta, Canada	
Win	6–0	Ainsley Robinson	Decision (unanimous)	Bellator 76	October 12, 2012	3	5:00	Windsor, Ontario, Canada	Lightweight debut.
Win	5–0	Josh Taveirne	Submission (triangle choke)	Bellator 64	April 6, 2012	1	2:48	Windsor, Ontario, Canada	
Win	4–0	Andrew McInnes	TKO (punches)	PFC 1: Border Wars	July 16, 2011	1	2:29	Windsor, Ontario, Canada	
Win	3–0	James Barber	TKO (punches)	XCC 64: Battle at the Border 10	August 28, 2010	1	1:08	Walpole Island, Ontario, Canada	
Win	2–0	Simonie Joannie	TKO (punches)	Fighting Spirit MMA 12: Furious	August 21, 2010	1	N/A	London, Ontario, Canada	
Win	1–0	James Barber	TKO (punches)	Fighting Spirit MMA: Meltdown	June 26, 2010	1	N/A	London, Ontario, Canada	

=== Mixed martial arts exhibition record ===
Professional record breakdown
2 matches	2 wins	0 losses
By knockout	1	0
By decision	1	0

Res.	Record	Opponent	Method	Event	Date	Round	Time	Location	Notes
Win	2–0	Kajan Johnson	KO (punch)	The Ultimate Fighter Nations: Canada vs. Australia	March 19, 2014 (airdate)	2	N/A	Quebec City, Quebec, Canada	Semi-finals
Win	1–0	Chris Indich	Decision (unanimous)	The Ultimate Fighter Nations: Canada vs. Australia	January 29, 2014 (airdate)	2	5:00	Quebec City, Quebec, Canada	Quarter-finals

== See also ==
- List of male mixed martial artists
- List of Canadian UFC fighters
