= Dan Kelly (fighter) =

Australian Olympic judoka and mixed martial arts fighter

Dan Josh Kelly
- Born: Daniel Thomas Kelly; 31 October 1977 (age 48); Melbourne, Australia
- Height: 6 ft 0 in (1.83 m)
- Weight: 185 lb (84 kg; 13 st 3 lb)
- Division: Middleweight
- Reach: 73 in (185 cm)
- Style: Judo
- Stance: Southpaw
- Team: Resilience Training Centre (2013–present)
- Rank: 4th dan black belt in Judo; 1st degree black belt in Brazilian Jiu-Jitsu under Gustavo Falciroli
- Years active: 2006–2018 (MMA)

Mixed martial arts record
- Total: 17
- Wins: 13
- By knockout: 3
- By submission: 5
- By decision: 5
- Losses: 4
- By knockout: 3
- By decision: 1

Other information
- Mixed martial arts record from Sherdog
- Judo career
- Weight class: ‍–‍81 kg, ‍–‍90 kg, ‍–‍100 kg

Judo achievements and titles
- Olympic Games: 7th (2004)
- World Champ.: 9th (1999)
- Oceania Champ.: (gold) (2002, 2003, 2004, 2008, 2010, 2011, 2012)
Medal record
Men's judo
Representing Australia
Oceania Championships
Gold medal – first place	2002 Wellington	‍–‍81 kg
Gold medal – first place	2003 Suva	‍–‍81 kg
Gold medal – first place	2004 Nouméa	‍–‍90 kg
Gold medal – first place	2008 Christchurch	‍–‍90 kg
Gold medal – first place	2010 Canberra	‍–‍100 kg
Gold medal – first place	2011 Papeete	‍–‍100 kg
Gold medal – first place	2012 Cairns	‍–‍100 kg
Silver medal – second place	1998 Apia	‍–‍81 kg
Silver medal – second place	2000 Sydney	‍–‍81 kg
Oceania Junior Championships
Gold medal – first place	1996 Wellington	‍–‍65 kg
Bronze medal – third place	1994 Sydney	‍–‍65 kg

Profile at external judo databases
- IJF: 1045
- JudoInside.com: 8921
- Last updated on: 29 October 2024

Daniel Thomas Kelly (born 31 October 1977) is an Australian former judoka and mixed martial artist. Known for his unconventional style, the four-time judo Olympian formerly competed in the middleweight division of the Ultimate Fighting Championship (UFC) between 2014 and 2018.

== Background and judo career ==
Kelly began competing in judo when he was 7 and competed at his first Australian Championships when he was 13. He made the junior national team in 1994 where he competed at the Junior World Championships and went on to make the senior national team two years later. Kelly has been Australian Champion on nine occasions.

Kelly is the only Judo competitor to have been selected to fight for Australia in four different Olympic games. He most recently competed at the 2012 Summer Olympics in the -100 kg event.

He was the Judo coach for the Australian team at the 2016 Rio Olympics and the 2020 Japan Olympics.

== Mixed martial arts career ==
=== Early career ===
Kelly made his professional MMA debut in July 2006. He remained out of competition for the next six and a half years due to judo commitments.

=== Australian Fighting Championship and local MMA ===
Kelly returned to the sport in December 2012. Over the next eight months, he improved his record to 5 wins with no losses. Kelly again returned to action in the Australian Fighting Championship (AFC) in May 2014, at AFC 9, defeating Ben Kelleher via second round submission. Kelly was twice slated to fight Steven Kennedy for the vacant AFC middleweight belt in 2013 at AFC 7 and 2014 at AFC 10, but was forced to withdraw due to The Ultimate Fighter Nations: Canada vs. Australia commitments in 2013 and due to injury in 2014.

=== The Ultimate Fighter ===
In December 2013, it was announced that Kelly was selected as one of the fighters to represent Australia for the upcoming The Ultimate Fighter Nations: Canada vs. Australia. Kelly was defeated by eventual middleweight runner-up Sheldon Westcott via first round submission.

=== Ultimate Fighting Championship ===
==== 2014 ====
Kelly made his UFC debut against Luke Zachrich on 8 November 2014 at UFC Fight Night 55. Kelly was victorious, winning by submission due to a kimura.

In his second bout for the promotion, Kelly faced Patrick Walsh on 14 February 2015 at UFC Fight Night 60. He won the fight by unanimous decision.

==== 2015 ====
Kelly faced Sam Alvey on 10 May 2015 at UFC Fight Night 65. He lost the fight via TKO in the first round.

Kelly was expected to face Ricardo Abreu on 15 November 2015 at UFC 193. However, Abreu pulled out of the fight in late September and was replaced by Steve Montgomery. Kelly won the fight by unanimous decision.

==== 2016 ====
Kelly faced Antônio Carlos Júnior on 20 March 2016 at UFC Fight Night 85. Kelly won the bout via TKO in the third round.

Kelly next faced Chris Camozzi on 27 November 2016 at UFC Fight Night 101. He won the fight via unanimous decision.

==== 2017 ====
Kelly faced Rashad Evans on 4 March 2017 at UFC 209. He won the back-and-forth fight by split decision.

Kelly faced Derek Brunson on 11 June 2017 at UFC Fight Night 110. He lost the fight via knockout in the first round.

Kelly faced Elias Theodorou on 19 November 2017 at UFC Fight Night: Werdum vs. Tybura. He lost the fight via unanimous decision.

==== 2018 ====
Kelly faced Tom Breese on 27 May 2018 at UFC Fight Night 130. He lost the fight via technical knock out in round one. Kelly became a free agent after the fight.

== Championships and accomplishments ==
=== Judo ===
- Olympic Games
  - 2000 Summer Olympics — 9th place (‍–‍81 kg)
  - 2004 Summer Olympics — 7th place (‍–‍90 kg)
  - 2008 Summer Olympics — 21st place (‍–‍90 kg)
  - 2012 Summer Olympics — 17th place (‍–‍100 kg)

=== Mixed martial arts ===
- Ultimate Fighting Championship
  - UFC.com Awards
    - 2017: Ranked #3 Upset of the Year vs. Rashad Evans

== Mixed martial arts record ==
Professional record breakdown
17 matches	13 wins	4 losses
By knockout	3	3
By submission	5	0
By decision	5	1

Res.	Record	Opponent	Method	Event	Date	Round	Time	Location	Notes
Loss	13–4	Tom Breese	TKO (punches)	UFC Fight Night: Thompson vs. Till	27 May 2018	1	3:33	Liverpool, England	
Loss	13–3	Elias Theodorou	Decision (unanimous)	UFC Fight Night: Werdum vs. Tybura	19 November 2017	3	5:00	Sydney, Australia	
Loss	13–2	Derek Brunson	KO (punches)	UFC Fight Night: Lewis vs. Hunt	11 June 2017	1	1:16	Auckland, New Zealand	
Win	13–1	Rashad Evans	Decision (split)	UFC 209	4 March 2017	3	5:00	Las Vegas, Nevada, United States	
Win	12–1	Chris Camozzi	Decision (unanimous)	UFC Fight Night: Whittaker vs. Brunson	27 November 2016	3	5:00	Melbourne, Australia	
Win	11–1	Antônio Carlos Júnior	TKO (punches)	UFC Fight Night: Hunt vs. Mir	20 March 2016	3	1:36	Brisbane, Australia	
Win	10–1	Steve Montgomery	Decision (unanimous)	UFC 193	15 November 2015	3	5:00	Melbourne, Australia	
Loss	9–1	Sam Alvey	TKO (punches)	UFC Fight Night: Miocic vs. Hunt	10 May 2015	1	0:49	Adelaide, Australia	
Win	9–0	Patrick Walsh	Decision (unanimous)	UFC Fight Night: Henderson vs. Thatch	14 February 2015	3	5:00	Broomfield, Colorado, United States	Catchweight (191.5 lbs) bout; Walsh missed weight.
Win	8–0	Luke Zachrich	Submission (kimura)	UFC Fight Night: Rockhold vs. Bisping	8 November 2014	1	4:27	Sydney, Australia	
Win	7–0	Ben Kelleher	Submission (rear-naked choke)	Australian FC 9	17 May 2014	2	3:41	Albury, Australia	
Win	6–0	Bor Bratovž	KO (punch)	Australian FC 6	24 August 2013	2	1:42	Melbourne, Australia	Australian FC Middleweight Tournament Semifinal.
Win	5–0	Daniel Way	Submission (armbar)	Shamrock Events: Night of Mayhem 7	22 June 2013	1	N/A	Melbourne, Australia	
Win	4–0	Chris Birch	Submission (rear-naked choke)	Australian FC 5	10 May 2013	1	3:36	Melbourne, Australia	Australian FC Middleweight Tournament Quarterfinal.
Win	3–0	Kym Robinson	Submission (rear-naked choke)	MMA Downunder 3	16 March 2013	1	1:17	Findon, Australia	Middleweight debut.
Win	2–0	Fabio Galeb	Decision (unanimous)	Australian FC 4	12 December 2012	3	5:00	Melbourne, Australia	
Win	1–0	Ross Dallow	TKO (thrown from the ring)	Dojo KO: Second Elimination	22 July 2006	2	N/A	Melbourne, Australia	Light Heavyweight debut.

=== Mixed martial arts exhibition record ===
Exhibition record breakdown		
1 match	0 wins	1 loss
By knockout	0	0
By submission	0	1
By decision	0	0

Res.	Record	Opponent	Method	Event	Date	Round	Time	Location	Notes
Loss	0–1	Sheldon Westcott	Submission (arm-triangle choke)	The Ultimate Fighter Nations: Canada vs. Australia	February 19, 2014 (airdate)	1	0:56	Quebec City, Quebec, Canada	Quarter-finals

== See also ==
- List of male mixed martial artists
