= Mehdi Baghdad =

French mixed martial artist

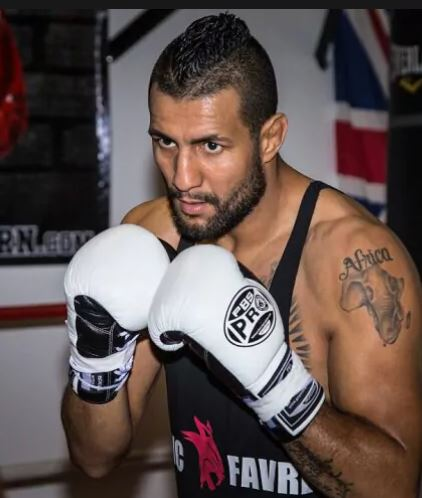
- Born: 13 April 1985 (age 41); La Seyne-sur-Mer, France
- Other names: Sultan
- Nationality: Algerian and French
- Height: 6 ft 1 in (1.85 m)
- Weight: 170 lb (77 kg; 12 st 2 lb)
- Division: Welterweight(2016-17) Lightweight (2007–13,2018-present) Featherweight(2013)
- Reach: 75 in (190 cm)
- Style: Brazilian Jiu-Jitsu, Muay Thai
- Stance: Orthodox
- Fighting out of: Los Angeles, California, U.S.
- Team: Black house
- Rank: Purple belt in Brazilian Jiu-Jitsu under Antônio "Nino" Schembri
- Years active: 2007–present

Mixed martial arts record
- Total: 20
- Wins: 13
- By knockout: 9
- By submission: 3
- By decision: 1
- Losses: 7
- By knockout: 3
- By submission: 1
- By decision: 3

Other information
- Mixed martial arts record from Sherdog
- Last updated on: 25 May 2016

Mehdi Baghdad (born 13 April 1985) is a French mixed martial artist who fights out of Los Angeles, California. He previously fought for the UFC in the lightweight division. He was a contestant on The Ultimate Fighter 22: Team McGregor vs Team Faber.

== Mixed martial arts career ==
Baghdad started training at the age of 16 and had his first fight at the age of 20. He went on to become a world champion in Muay Thai, WKBC also lightweight champion in RFA MMA. Baghdad is inspired by his father who died when he was young, and former world champion boxer Prince Naseem Hamed. Baghdad's first loss was handed to him by UFC competitor Charles Oliveira. Baghdad's nickname is Sultan, which in Arabic means High King / Emperor.

=== The Ultimate Fighter ===
Baghdad joined the Ultimate Fighter 22: Team McGregor vs Team Faber. Baghdad defeated Artem Lobov via majority decision after two rounds. He then joined McGregor's team (European team). Unfortunately Julian Erosa defeated Mehdi Baghdad via majority decision after two rounds in the preliminary fights, this would eliminate him from the tournament.

=== Ultimate Fighting Championship ===
Despite losing TUF 22 Baghdad would still be signed by the promotion and would have his first match against Chris Wade on UFC Fight Night 81 on 17 January 2016. Baghdad would lose 4 minutes and 30 seconds into the first round by tapping out to the rear - naked choke.

Baghdad was expected to face John Makdessi on 4 June 2016 at UFC 199 but was rescheduled to 7 July 2016 at UFC Fight Night 90. Makdessi was awarded a split decision victory.

Baghdad was scheduled to face Jon Tuck on 15 October 2016 at UFC Fight Night 97. However, Baghdad pulled out of the fight in mid-September citing injury and was replaced by promotional newcomer Alex Volkanovski. In turn, Baghdad was released from the promotion.

=== The Ultimate Fighter: Redemption ===
In February 2017, it was revealed that Baghdad would again compete on the UFC's reality show in the 25th season on The Ultimate Fighter: Redemption. Baghdad was the second pick overall for Team Garbrandt. He faced Jesse Taylor in the opening round and lost via unanimous decision.

=== Post UFC ===
Baghdad faced Thibault Gouti for the LTDE Super Lightweight belt on 2 July 2021 at Trophee des Etoiles 15. Baghdad lost the bout via TKO in the first round.

== Mixed martial arts record ==
Professional record breakdown
20 matches	13 wins	7 losses
By knockout	9	3
By submission	3	1
By decision	1	3

Res.	Record	Opponent	Method	Event	Date	Round	Time	Location	Notes
Win	13–7	Shabiotas Stanislas	TKO (punches)	Energy Fight Club 2	7 March 2025	2	N/A	Toulon, France	
Loss	12–7	Thibault Gouti	TKO (punches)	Trophee des Etoiles 15	2 July 2021	1	N/A	Aix-en-Provence, France	For the LTDE Super Lightweight Championship.
Win	12–6	Erivan Pereira	Decision (split)	Brave 25	30 August 2019	3	5:00	Belo Horizonte, Brazil	
Loss	11–6	Pawel Kielek	Decision (unanimous)	Brave 12 - KHK Legacy	11 May 2018	3	5:00	Jakarta, Indonesia	
Loss	11–5	John Makdessi	Decision (split)	UFC Fight Night: dos Anjos vs. Alvarez	7 July 2016	3	5:00	Las Vegas, Nevada, United States	
Loss	11–4	Chris Wade	Submission (rear-naked choke)	UFC Fight Night: Dillashaw vs. Cruz	17 January 2016	1	4:30	Boston, Massachusetts, United States	
Win	11–3	Zach Juusola	TKO (punches)	RFA 21 - Juusola vs. Baghdad	5 December 2014	4	2:37	Costa Mesa, California, United States	Won the vacant RFA Lightweight Championship.
Win	10–3	Evan Delong	TKO (punches)	RFA 18 - Manzanares vs. Pantoja	12 September 2014	1	1:55	Albuquerque, New Mexico, United States	Return to Lightweight.
Win	9–3	Nicholas Christy	Submission (choke)	West Coast FC 7: Griffin vs. Gonzalez	16 November 2013	2	4:57	Sacramento, California, United States	Featherweight debut.
Win	8–3	Dionisio Ramirez	Submission (choke)	BAMMA USA: Badbeat 11	25 October 2013	2	1:53	Commerce, California, United States	Won the BAMMA USA Lightweight Championship.
Win	7–3	Tom Douglas	TKO (punches)	Gladiator Challenge: Summer Heat	30 June 2013	1	0:42	San Jacinto, California, United States	
Win	6–3	Dominic Gutierrez	Submission (anaconda choke)	All Star Boxing	21 September 2012	2	2:31	Oceanside, California, United States	
Win	5–3	Mike Sandez	KO (punch)	Marconi Fight Night	9 March 2012	1	2:30	Tustin, California, United States	
Loss	4–3	Yves Landu	Decision (unanimous)	100% Fight 5	28 May 2011	2	5:00	Paris, France	
Win	4–2	Randall Jimenez	TKO (soccer kicks and punches)	Xtreme Vale Todo 5: Franca vs. Kheder	19 December 2010	1	0:37	Cartago, Costa Rica	
Win	3–2	Jeffry Lopez Madrigal	TKO (punches)	Xtreme Vale Todo 4	26 June 2010	1	3:45	Guanacaste, Costa Rica	
Loss	2–2	Juan Puig	TKO (punches)	Panama Fight League: Ultimate Combat Challenge 5	22 May 2010	2	3:37	Panama City, Panama	
Win	2–1	Rudy Saoudi	TKO (leg kicks)	100% Fight: Contenders 4	10 October 2009	2	1:43	Paris, France	
Loss	1–1	Charles Oliveira	TKO (punches)	Kawai Arena 1	13 December 2008	1	1:01	São Paulo, Brazil	
Win	1–0	Unknown Fighter	TKO (knees and punches)	Rio Recreio Fighting	14 March 2007	1	2:00	Rio de Janeiro, Brazil	

=== Mixed martial arts exhibition record ===
Professional record breakdown
3 matches	1 win	2 losses
By decision	1	2

Res.	Record	Opponent	Method	Event	Date	Round	Time	Location	Notes
Loss	1–2	Jesse Taylor	Decision (Unanimous)	The Ultimate Fighter: Team Garbrandt vs Team Dillashaw	3 May 2017	2	5:00	Las Vegas, Nevada, United States	Eliminated from the TUF 25 tournament
Loss	1–1	Julian Erosa	Decision (majority)	The Ultimate Fighter: Team McGregor vs Team Faber	21 October 2015	2	5:00	Las Vegas, Nevada, United States	Eliminated from the TUF 22 tournament
Win	1–0	Artem Lobov	Decision (majority)	The Ultimate Fighter: Team McGregor vs Team Faber	9 September 2015	2	5:00	Las Vegas, Nevada, United States	Entered in the TUF 22 tournament

== See also ==
- List of current Brave CF fighters
