= Dylan Ryder =

American pornographic film actress (born 1981)

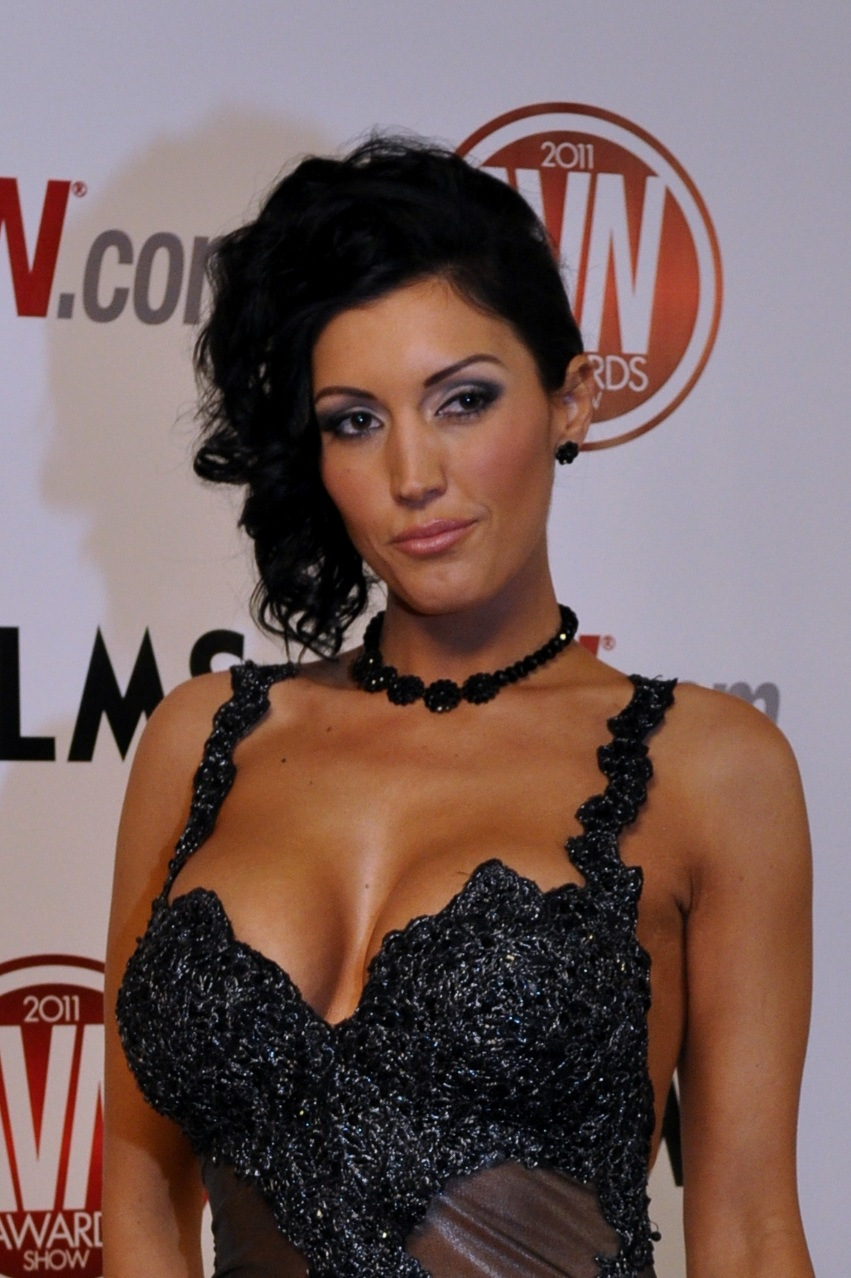
- Ryder at the 2011 AVN Awards show
- Born: 1981 (age 44–45)
- Occupation: Pornographic film actress
- Website: dylanryder.com

Dylan Ryder (born 1981) is a former American pornographic film actress.

== Early life ==
Ryder is of Italian and German descent. She has two younger sisters, Jocelyn and Jillian Lybarger, who are a mixed martial arts twin duo.

Ryder was a competitive swimmer and participated in water polo leagues from the time she was eight years old until her junior year in high school.

Ryder used to work as a drug and alcohol rehabilitation counselor for prison inmates in California. She was also a prison officer in Arizona.

== Career ==
Ryder entered the adult film industry in 2004 around age 23. She came up with her stage name when she was looking through a pornographic magazine and saw the name "Dylan" and the phrase "Ride Her". She left the industry after six months and returned in 2008.

In March 2011, Bluebird Films signed Ryder to an exclusive performing contract. This contract ended in 2012. Later that year, Complex ranked her 52nd on their list of "The Top 100 Hottest Porn Stars (Right Now)".

Ryder co-hosted the 28th Annual XRCO Awards Show on April 19, 2012. After finishing second in the Miss Freeones competition, she announced her retirement from active involvement in the adult industry in May 2012, though she continues to operate her website.

== Appearances ==
In 2011, Ryder began co-hosting a Playboy Radio online show with Alektra Blue.

Ryder has made several magazine appearances such as Australia's Picture and People, men's magazines Penthouse and Velvet, and the March 2012 issue of Maxim as "reason number 17 to watch UFC".

== Other ventures ==
Ryder was a contributor to the 2010 book Porn - Philosophy for Everyone: How to Think with Kink, where she co-authored the first chapter. Also in 2010, Ryder interviewed several female MMA fighters at a Tuff-N-Uff Amateur Fighting Championships event in Las Vegas for her website. Her sisters were competitors in the event.

== Personal life ==
Her sisters Jill and Jocelyn Lybarger are MMA competitors.

== Partial filmography ==
Year	Title	Role	Notes
2009	Keeping It Up For the KardASSians	Kourtney Kardashian	
2010	Jersey Shore XXX: A Porn Parody	Sammi Sweetheart	
2011	Katwoman XXX	Katwoman	Nominated—XBIZ Award for Acting Performance of the Year - Female (2012)
2011	Keeping It Up For the KardASSians 2	Kim Kardashian	
2011	This Ain't Cougar Town XXX	Jules Cobb	

== Awards and nominations ==
Year	Ceremony	Result	Award	Work
2011	AVN Award	Nominated	Best Group Sex Scene (with Julia Ann, Natasha Marley, Bobbi Starr, Paul Chaplin, Tommy Gunn, Will Powers & Billy Glide)	Bonny & Clide
2011	AVN Award	Nominated	Unsung Starlet of the Year	—N/a
2011	XBIZ Award	Nominated	MILF Site of the Year	DylanRyder.com
2011	XRCO Award	Nominated	Unsung Siren	—N/a
2012	AVN Award	Nominated	Best Porn Star Website	DylanRyder.com
2012	XBIZ Award	Nominated	Acting Performance of the Year - Female	Katwoman XXX
2012	XBIZ Award	Nominated	Porn Star Site of the Year	DylanRyder.com
