= Tony Sims =

American mixed martial arts fighter

- Born: Anthony Marshall Sims; October 14, 1985 (age 41); Davenport, Iowa, United States
- Other names: 2.0
- Height: 5 ft 11 in (1.80 m)
- Weight: 155 lb (70 kg; 11 st 1 lb)
- Division: Lightweight
- Reach: 70 in (178 cm)
- Style: Boxing
- Fighting out of: Denver, Colorado, United States
- Team: Elevation Fight Team (2013–present)
- Years active: 2008–present

Mixed martial arts record
- Total: 16
- Wins: 12
- By knockout: 10
- By submission: 2
- Losses: 4
- By submission: 2
- By decision: 2

Other information
- Mixed martial arts record from Sherdog

Anthony Marshall Sims (born October 14, 1985) is an American mixed martial artist who competes in the lightweight division. He is best known for competing in the Ultimate Fighting Championship (UFC).

== Background ==
Tony grew up with an older brother in Davenport, Iowa. Urged by their single mother to find some activities, Tony started boxing at the age of seven. He also picked up wrestling at the age of 12. Tony completed his undergraduate degrees in Architecture and Engineering from Iowa State University before completing his graduate studies in University of Minnesota.

== Mixed martial arts career ==
=== Ultimate Fighting Championship ===
Sims made his UFC debut against Steve Montgomery on June 27, 2015 at UFC Fight Night: Machida vs. Romero. He won the fight by knockout in the first round.

Sims next fought Olivier Aubin-Mercier on short notice at UFC Fight Night: Holloway vs. Oliveira on August 23, 2015, replacing an injured Chris Wade. He lost the fight to Aubin-Mercier by unanimous decision.

Sims faced Abel Trujillo on January 20, 2016 at UFC 195. He lost the fight by guillotine choke in the first round. He was subsequently released from the promotion.

== Championships and accomplishments ==
- Prize FC
  - Prize FC Lightweight Championship (one time)
    - Two successful title defenses
- Fight to Win
  - Fight to Win Lightweight Championship (one time)
    - One successful title defense

== Mixed martial arts record ==
Professional record breakdown
16 matches	12 wins	4 losses
By knockout	10	0
By submission	2	2
By decision	0	2

Res.	Record	Opponent	Method	Event	Date	Round	Time	Location	Notes
Loss	12–4	Abel Trujillo	Submission (guillotine choke)	UFC 195	January 2, 2016	1	3:18	Las Vegas, Nevada, United States	
Loss	12–3	Olivier Aubin-Mercier	Decision (unanimous)	UFC Fight Night: Holloway vs. Oliveira	August 23, 2015	3	5:00	Saskatoon, Saskatchewan, Canada	
Win	12–2	Steve Montgomery	KO (punches)	UFC Fight Night: Machida vs. Romero	June 27, 2015	1	2:43	Hollywood, Florida, United States	Welterweight bout.
Win	11–2	Anselmo Luna	TKO (punches)	FTW: Machines	May 8, 2015	3	0:39	Denver, Colorado, United States	Defended the Fight to Win Lightweight Championship.
Win	10–2	Joshua Sandvig	TKO (doctor stoppage)	FTW: Prize Fighting Championship 8	March 6, 2015	2	5:00	Denver, Colorado, United States	Defended the Prize FC Lightweight Championship.
Win	9–2	James Steele McCall	TKO (punches)	FTW: Animals	April 18, 2014	2	0:13	Denver, Colorado, United States	Won the vacant Fight to Win Lightweight Championship.
Loss	8–2	Drew Dober	Decision (split)	FTW: Prize Fighting Championship 4	October 18, 2013	3	5:00	Denver, Colorado, United States	
Win	8–1	Mitchell Hale	TKO (punches)	FTW: Prize Fighting Championship 3	September 20, 2013	1	3:07	Midland, Texas, United States	Defended the Prize FC Lightweight Championship.
Win	7–1	Thomas Denny	KO (punches)	FTW: Prize Fighting Championship 2	July 13, 2013	1	1:08	Denver, Colorado, United States	
Win	6–1	Chase Hackett	KO (punch)	FTW: Prize Fighting Championship 1	January 25, 2013	1	3:09	Denver, Colorado, United States	Won the Prize FC Lightweight Championship.
Win	5–1	Chris Bennett	Submission (guillotine choke)	MMA Big Show: A Prodigy Returns	April 17, 2010	1	3:51	Florence, Indiana, United States	
Win	4–1	Josh Shaffer	TKO (punches)	KOTC: Ice Age	March 10, 2010	1	0:14	Mahnomen, Minnesota, United States	
Win	3–1	Aaron Beeman	Submission (rear-naked choke)	Brutaal: Fight Nation	August 22, 2008	2	2:30	Boone, Iowa, United States	
Win	2–1	Gabe Walbridge	TKO (punches)	Barrera Promotions: Fightfest	July 12, 2008	2	1:40	Somerset, Wisconsin, United States	
Win	1–1	Rich Sherer	TKO (punches)	Brutaal: Fight Night	June 13, 2008	1	0:41	Maplewood, Minnesota, United States	
Loss	0–1	Joe Lynch	Submission (triangle choke)	Brutaal: Fight Night	March 7, 2008	2	1:58	Maplewood, Minnesota, United States	

== See also ==
- List of male mixed martial artists
