= Brian Camozzi =

American mixed martial arts fighter

- Born: June 24, 1991 (age 35); Alameda, California, United States
- Other names: The Mantis
- Height: 6 ft 2 in (1.88 m)
- Weight: 77 kg (170 lb; 12 st 2 lb)
- Division: Welterweight
- Reach: 78 in (198 cm)
- Style: Wrestling, Kickboxing, BJJ
- Fighting out of: Parker, Colorado, United States
- Team: FactoryX Muay Thai
- Rank: Purple belt in Brazilian Jiu-Jitsu
- Years active: 2012–present

Mixed martial arts record
- Total: 12
- Wins: 7
- By knockout: 3
- By submission: 4
- Losses: 5
- By knockout: 2
- By submission: 1
- By decision: 2

Other information
- Notable relatives: Chris Camozzi (brother)
- Mixed martial arts record from Sherdog

Brian Camozzi (born June 24, 1991) is an American mixed martial artist. He was the Welterweight Champion for Resurrection Fighting Alliance and Sparta Combat League. Camozzi currently competes in Welterweight division of the Ultimate Fighting Championship (UFC). He is the younger brother of former UFC Middleweight fighter Chris Camozzi.

== Background ==
Camozzi was born in Alameda, California and he has a brother, Chris Camozzi, who is an MMA fighter, and formerly fought for the UFC in the middleweight division. He played rugby, football and competed in wrestling when he was in high school. He was introduced to MMA by his older brother Chris, who paid for his gym fee up until Camozzi graduated from high school. Camozzi fell in love with the sport after his first BJJ and kickboxing classes. He started train full-time after high school and participated in MMA competition not long after.

== Mixed martial arts career ==
=== Early career ===
Camozzi made his professional MMA debut in January 2013 for Sparta Combat League and he has fought for other promotions including North American Allied Fight Series, Fight to Win and Resurrection Fighting Alliance. He amassed a record of 7-2 prior joining UFC.

=== Ultimate Fighting Championship ===
Camozzi made his short notice promotional debut, replacing Charlie Ward citing a visa issue, on December 9, 2016, at UFC Fight Night: Lewis vs. Abdurakhimov against Randy Brown in Albany, New York. He lost the fight via TKO on round two.

Camozzi was expected to face Alan Jouban at UFC 213 on July 8, 2017. However, Jouban was removed from the card citing foot injury replaced by Chad Laprise. Laprise won the fight via TKO in the third round.

Camozzi faced Geoff Neal on February 18, 2018, at UFC Fight Night: Cowboy vs. Medeiros. He lost the bout via submission in the first round.

== Championships and accomplishments ==
=== Mixed martial arts ===
- Resurrection Fighting Alliance
  - Resurrection Fighting Alliance Welterweight Champion (One time) vs. Nick Barnes
- Sparta Combat League
  - Sparta Combat League Welterweight Champion (One time) vs. Matt Cox

== Personal life ==
Camozzi's brother, Chris Camozzi, is a mixed martial artist who competed under the UFC banner 2 separate times from June 2010 to September 2014, and then April 2015 to May 2017.

== Mixed martial arts record ==
Professional record breakdown
12 matches	7 wins	5 losses
By knockout	3	2
By submission	4	1
By decision	0	2

Res.	Record	Opponent	Method	Event	Date	Round	Time	Location	Notes
Loss	7–5	Geoff Neal	Submission (rear naked choke)	UFC Fight Night: Cowboy vs. Medeiros	February 18, 2018	1	2:48	Austin, Texas, United States	
Loss	7–4	Chad Laprise	TKO (punches and elbows)	UFC 213	July 8, 2017	3	1:27	Las Vegas, Nevada, United States	
Loss	7–3	Randy Brown	TKO (knee and punches)	UFC Fight Night: Lewis vs. Abdurakhimov	December 9, 2016	2	1:25	Albany, New York, United States	
Win	7–2	Nick Barnes	Technical Submission (guillotine choke)	RFA 43	September 9, 2016	1	1:40	Broomfield, Colorado, United States	Won the vacant RFA Welterweight Championship.
Win	6–2	Kenneth Glenn	KO (knee)	RFA 37	April 15, 2016	3	1:02	Sioux Falls, South Dakota, United States	
Win	5–2	Tyler Milner	Submission (rear-naked choke)	RFA 34	January 15, 2016	1	1:20	Broomfield, Colorado, United States	
Win	4–2	Matt Cox	Submission (armbar)	Sparta Combat League 40	January 24, 2015	1	2:06	Denver, Colorado, United States	Won the Sparta Combat League Welterweight Championship.
Win	3–2	Brian Maronek	TKO (punches)	Sparta Combat League: Fall Brawl	September 7, 2014	1	1:18	Denver, Colorado, United States	
Loss	2–2	Josh Cavan	Decision (split)	Fight to Win: Prize FC 5	February 7, 2014	3	5:00	Denver, Colorado, United States	Welterweight debut.
Loss	2–1	George Comer	Decision (unanimous)	North American Allied Fight Series 9	June 1, 2013	3	5:00	Cleveland, Ohio, United States	
Win	2–0	Ian Stonehouse	TKO (slam and punches)	Sparta Combat League: Fight for the Troops	April 20, 2013	1	1:19	Loveland, Colorado, United States	
Win	1–0	Cruz Soltero	Submission (rear-naked choke)	Sparta Combat League: Prepare For Glory	January 26, 2013	1	3:52	Denver, Colorado, United States	Lightweight debut.

== See also ==
- List of current UFC fighters
- List of male mixed martial artists
