= UFC Fight Night: Dillashaw vs. Cruz =

UFC mixed martial arts event in 2016

- The poster for UFC Fight Night: Dillashaw vs. Cruz
- Promotion: Ultimate Fighting Championship
- Date: January 17, 2016
- Venue: TD Garden
- City: Boston, Massachusetts
- Attendance: 12,790
- Total gate: $1,300,000

Event chronology
UFC 195: Lawler vs. Condit	UFC Fight Night: Dillashaw vs. Cruz	UFC on Fox: Johnson vs. Bader

UFC Fight Night: Dillashaw vs. Cruz (also known as UFC Fight Night 81) was a mixed martial arts event held on January 17, 2016, at the TD Garden in Boston, Massachusetts.

== Background ==
A UFC Bantamweight Championship bout between defending champion T.J. Dillashaw and former WEC and UFC Bantamweight champion Dominick Cruz headlined this event.

Beneil Dariush was expected to face Mairbek Taisumov at this event. However, on December 3, Dariush was forced to pull out of the bout due to injury. He was replaced by Chris Wade. In turn, Taisumov was pulled from the fight during the week leading to the event due to alleged visa issues and was replaced by promotional newcomer Mehdi Baghdad.

Dennis Bermudez was expected to face Maximo Blanco at this event. However, on December 5, Bermudez pulled out of the bout due to a staph infection in his shin. On January 4, it was announced that he was replaced by promotional newcomer Luke Sanders.

Patrick Williams was expected to face Rob Font at this event. However, Williams was forced to pull out due to injury in late December and was replaced by promotional newcomer Joey Gomez.

Jimy Hettes was expected to face Charles Rosa. However, on January 10, only 8 days before the event, Hettes pulled out due to injury. He was very briefly replaced by promotional newcomer Augusto Mendes. Just two days later, Mendes was removed from the fight and was replaced by fellow newcomer Kyle Bochniak.

Promotional newcomer Abdul-Kerim Edilov was expected to face Francimar Barroso at the event. However, Edilov pulled out of the fight in the days leading up to the event citing a knee injury and was replaced by fellow newcomer Elvis Mutapčić.

== Results ==
Main Card (Fox Sports 1)
Weight class				Method	Round	Time	Notes
Bantamweight	Dominick Cruz	def.	T.J. Dillashaw (c)	Decision (split) (48–47, 46–49, 49–46)	5	5:00	(Note: For the UFC Bantamweight Championship.)
Lightweight	Eddie Alvarez	def.	Anthony Pettis	Decision (split) (29–28, 28–29, 29–28)	3	5:00
Heavyweight	Travis Browne	def.	Matt Mitrione	TKO (punches)	3	4:09
Lightweight	Francisco Trinaldo	def.	Ross Pearson	Decision (unanimous) (30–27, 29–28, 30–27)	3	5:00
Preliminary Card (Fox Sports 1)
Welterweight	Patrick Côté	def.	Ben Saunders	TKO (punches)	2	1:14
Light Heavyweight	Ed Herman	def.	Tim Boetsch	TKO (knee and punches)	2	1:39
Lightweight	Chris Wade	def.	Mehdi Baghdad	Submission (rear-naked choke)	1	4:30
Featherweight	Luke Sanders	def.	Maximo Blanco	Submission (rear-naked choke)	1	3:38
Preliminary Card (UFC Fight Pass)
Lightweight	Paul Felder	def.	Daron Cruickshank	Submission (rear-naked choke)	3	3:56
Light Heavyweight	Ilir Latifi	def.	Sean O'Connell	KO (punches)	1	0:30
Featherweight	Charles Rosa	def.	Kyle Bochniak	Decision (unanimous) (29–28, 29–28, 30–27)	3	5:00
Bantamweight	Rob Font	def.	Joey Gomez	TKO (punches)	2	4:13
Light Heavyweight	Francimar Barroso	def.	Elvis Mutapčić	Decision (unanimous) (30–27, 29–28, 30–27)	3	5:00

== Bonus awards ==
The following fighters were awarded $50,000 bonuses:

- Fight of the Night: T.J. Dillashaw vs. Dominick Cruz
- Performance of the Night: Ed Herman and Luke Sanders

== Reported payouts ==
The following is the reported payout to the fighters as reported to the Massachusetts State Athletic Commission. It does not include sponsor money or "locker room" bonuses often given by the UFC and also do not include the UFC's traditional "fight night" bonuses.

- Dominick Cruz: $110,000 (includes $55,000 win bonus) def. T.J. Dillashaw: $70,000
- Eddie Alvarez: $100,000 (no win bonus) def. Anthony Pettis: $80,000
- Travis Browne: $120,000 (includes $60,000 win bonus) def. Matt Mitrione: $36,000
- Francisco Trinaldo: $54,000 (includes $27,000 win bonus) def. Ross Pearson: $48,000
- Patrick Côté: $86,000 (includes $43,000 win bonus) def. Ben Saunders: $18,000
- Ed Herman: $94,000 (includes $47,000 win bonus) def. Tim Boetsch: $52,000
- Chris Wade: $34,000 (includes $17,000 win bonus) def. Mehdi Baghdad: $12,000
- Luke Sanders: $20,000 (includes $10,000 win bonus) def. Maximo Blanco: $25,000
- Paul Felder: $36,000 (includes $18,000 win bonus) def. Daron Cruickshank: $20,000
- Ilir Latifi: $44,000 (includes $22,000 win bonus) def. Sean O'Connell: $18,000
- Charles Rosa: $24,000 (includes $12,000 win bonus) def. Kyle Bochniak $10,000
- Rob Font: $20,000 (includes $10,000 win bonus) def. Joey Gomez: $10,000
- Francimar Barroso: $30,000 (includes $15,000 win bonus) def. Elvis Mutapcic: $18,000

== See also ==
- List of UFC events
- 2016 in UFC
