= James Edson Berto =

Haitian mixed martial arts fighter

- Born: James Edson Berto; July 5, 1983 (age 43); Gros-Morne, Haiti
- Other names: Little Tiger
- Height: 5 ft 6 in (1.68 m)
- Weight: 145 lb (66 kg; 10.4 st)
- Division: Featherweight; Lightweight
- Reach: 69.0 in (175 cm)
- Fighting out of: Orlando, Florida, United States
- Team: Tiger's World of Martial Arts
- Years active: 2004–present

Mixed martial arts record
- Total: 30
- Wins: 17
- By knockout: 4
- By submission: 10
- By decision: 3
- Losses: 12
- By knockout: 3
- By submission: 1
- By decision: 8
- Draws: 1

Other information
- Mixed martial arts record from Sherdog

James Edson Berto, also known as Edson Berto (born July 5, 1983), is a Haitian-American professional mixed martial artist currently competing in the Featherweight division. A professional competitor since 2004, Berto has formerly competed for Bellator MMA, Strikeforce, and EliteXC. Berto is the brother of professional boxer Andre Berto.

== Background ==
Originally from Haiti, Berto moved with his family and six younger siblings to Winter Haven, Florida at a young age. Berto began training in the martial arts when he was young, as his father Diesuel was a mixed martial artist who competed at UFC 10. Also like his father, Berto competed in soccer at the professional level in Haiti.

== Mixed martial arts record ==
Professional record breakdown
30 matches	17 wins	12 losses
By knockout	4	3
By submission	10	1
By decision	3	8
Draws	1	

Res.	Record	Opponent	Method	Event	Date	Round	Time	Location	Notes
Loss	17-12-1	Rad Martinez	Decision (unanimous)	Bellator 114	March 28, 2014	3	5:00	West Valley City, Utah, United States	Featherweight debut.
Loss	17-11-1	Patricky Freire	Decision (unanimous)	Bellator 107	November 8, 2013	3	5:00	Thackerville, Oklahoma, United States	
Win	17-10-1	Bruno Carvalho	Submission (heel hook)	Bellator 94	March 28, 2013	1	1:27	Tampa, Florida, United States	
Loss	16-10-1	Abel Trujillo	Submission (punches)	CFA 6	April 13, 2012	1	1:10	Coral Gables, Florida, United States	
Loss	16-9-1	Luis Palomino	Decision (unanimous)	W-1 MMA 7	October 15, 2011	3	5:00	Coral Gables, Florida, United States	
Win	16-8-1	Greg Loughran	Submission (heel hook)	AOF 7	April 3, 2010	1	2:05	Tampa, Florida, United States	
Loss	15-8-1	Jason Ball	Decision (unanimous)	RFC 19	November 13, 2009	5	5:00	Tampa, Florida, United States	
Loss	15-7-1	Jason Ball	Decision (split)	RFC 18	July 24, 2009	3	5:00	Tampa, Florida, United States	
Win	15-6-1	Edson Diniz	Decision (split)	RFC 16	February 27, 2009	3	5:00	Tampa, Florida, United States	
Loss	14-6-1	Conor Heun	TKO (punches and elbows)	EliteXC: Heat	October 4, 2008	2	2:18	Sunrise, Florida, United States	
Loss	14-5-1	Yves Edwards	KO (flying knee)	EliteXC: Street Certified	February 16, 2008	1	4:56	Miami, Florida, United States	
Win	14-4-1	Josh Odom	Decision (unanimous)	RFC 10	November 10, 2007	3	5:00	Tampa, Florida, United States	
Win	13-4-1	Juan Barrantes	Decision (unanimous)	RFC 9	September 15, 2007	5	5:00	Tampa, Florida, United States	
Loss	12-4-1	K. J. Noons	KO (knee)	ShoXC: Elite Challenger Series	July 27, 2007	3	0:45	Santa Ynez, California, United States	
Win	12-3-1	Victor Valenzuela	Submission (heel hook)	Strikeforce: Shamrock vs. Baroni	June 22, 2007	1	0:47	San Jose, California, United States	
Win	11-3-1	John Shackleford	TKO (punches)	EliteXC: Destiny	February 10, 2007	2	2:27	Southaven, Mississippi, United States	
Win	10-3-1	Chris Mickle	Submission (heel hook)	RFC 7	November 4, 2006	1	0:22	Tampa, Florida, United States	
Win	9-3-1	Mike Bogner	Submission (heel hook)	RFC 6	September 15, 2006	1	2:56	Tampa, Florida, United States	
Win	8-3-1	Brandon McConkey	TKO (punches)	RFC 5	June 2, 2006	2	4:25	Tampa, Florida, United States	
Draw	7-3-1	Matt Lee	Draw	AFC 16	April 22, 2006	2	5:00	Boca Raton, Florida, United States	
Win	7-3	Peter Kalvijec	Submission (heel hook)	RFC 4	February 10, 2006	1	1:08	Tampa, Florida, United States	
Win	6-3	Harris Norwood	Submission (heel hook)	RFC 3	November 11, 2005	1	4:42	Tampa, Florida, United States	
Loss	5-3	Adriano Pereira	Decision (split)	AFC 13	July 30, 2005	2	5:00	Fort Lauderdale, Florida, United States	
Win	5-2	Renat Myzabekov	Submission (heel hook)	RFC 2	July 22, 2005	1	2:49	Tampa, Florida, United States	
Win	4-2	Marshall Blevins	Submission (heel hook)	RCF: Punishment	May 21, 2005	2	1:40	Biloxi, Mississippi, United States	
Loss	3-2	Keith Wilson	Decision (unanimous)	RFC 1	February 18, 2005	3	5:00	Tampa, Florida, United States	
Loss	3-1	Bryan Medlin	Decision (majority)	AFC 9	July 31, 2004	2	5:00	Fort Lauderdale, Florida, United States	
Win	3-0	Chad Gauldin	TKO (punches)	AFC 8	May 1, 2004	1	2:55	Fort Lauderdale, Florida, United States	
Win	2-0	Gregory Roberts	TKO (strikes)	Obaktagon Challenge 1	April 10, 2004	3	1:15	Jacksonville, Florida, United States	
Win	1-0	Scott Johnson	Submission (punches)	AFC 7	February 27, 2004	1	4:59	Fort Lauderdale, Florida, United States	
