= Jocelyn Jones-Lybarger =

American mixed martial arts fighter

- Born: Jocelyn Lybarger; October 4, 1985 (age 41); Fresno, California, United States
- Height: 5 ft 7 in (170 cm)
- Weight: 115 lb (52 kg; 8 st 3 lb)
- Division: Strawweight
- Reach: 66 in (170 cm)
- Team: MMA Lab
- Rank: Blue belt in Brazilian Jiu-Jitsu
- Years active: 2010–2017

Mixed martial arts record
- Total: 10
- Wins: 6
- By submission: 1
- By decision: 5
- Losses: 4
- By submission: 1
- By decision: 3

Other information
- Notable relatives: Dylan Ryder
- Mixed martial arts record from Sherdog

Jocelyn Jones-Lybarger is an American former mixed martial artist who competed in the Strawweight division of the UFC and has competed in Invicta. She competed at UFC Fight Night: MacDonald vs. Thompson. On January 19, 2017, she announced her retirement from MMA.

== Personal life ==
Jones-Lybarger has a twin sister named Jillian, who is also a mixed martial artist. Their older sister Shannon is the retired pornographic actress Dylan Ryder. Jocelyn Jones-Lybarger is a fan of the Los Angeles Chargers.

== Championships and achievements ==
=== Mixed martial arts ===
- Resurrection Fighting Alliance
  - RFA Strawweight Title (One time)
- Tuff-N-Uff
  - Amateur Tuff-N-Uff Strawweight Title (One time)

== Mixed martial arts record ==
Professional record breakdown
10 matches	6 wins	4 losses
By submission	1	1
By decision	5	3

Res.	Record	Opponent	Method	Event	Date	Round	Time	Location	Notes
Loss	6–4	Nina Ansaroff	Submission (rear-naked choke)	UFC Fight Night: Rodríguez vs. Penn	January 15, 2017	3	3:39	Phoenix, Arizona, United States	
Loss	6–3	Randa Markos	Decision (unanimous)	UFC Fight Night: MacDonald vs. Thompson	June 18, 2016	3	5:00	Ottawa, Ontario, Canada	Catchweight (117.5 lbs) bout; Markos missed weight.
Loss	6–2	Tecia Torres	Decision (unanimous)	UFC 194	December 12, 2015	3	5:00	Las Vegas, Nevada, United States	
Win	6–1	Zoila Frausto	Decision (unanimous)	RFA 31	October 9, 2015	3	5:00	Las Vegas, Nevada, United States	Won the vacant RFA Strawweight Championship.
Win	5–1	Maria Rios	Decision (unanimous)	RFA 23	February 6, 2015	3	5:00	Costa Mesa, California, United States	Catchweight (117.2 lbs) bout; Jones-Lybarger missed weight.
Win	4–1	Rebecca Ruth	Decision (split)	RFA 19	October 10, 2014	3	5:00	Prior Lake, Minnesota, United States	Strawweight debut.
Win	3–1	Rosa Acevedo	Decision (unanimous)	RFA 14	April 11, 2014	3	5:00	Cheyenne, Wyoming, United States	Catchweight (120 lbs) bout.
Loss	2–1	Sarah Alpar	Decision (unanimous)	KOTC - Heated Fury	July 20, 2013	3	5:00	Scottsdale, Arizona, United States	
Win	2–0	Jessica Armstrong-Kennett	Submission (guillotine choke)	KOTC: World Championships	May 23, 2013	1	0:27	Scottsdale, Arizona, United States	
Win	1–0	Cheryl Chan	Decision (unanimous)	Invicta FC 2 - Baszler vs. McMann	July 28, 2012	3	5:00	Kansas City, Kansas, United States	

== Amateur mixed martial arts record ==
Professional record breakdown
6 matches	4 wins	2 losses
By knockout	1	0
By submission	0	1
By decision	3	1

Res.	Record	Opponent	Method	Event	Date	Round	Time	Location	Notes
Win	4–2	Ashley Yoder	Decision (split)	Tuff-N-Uff - The Fist-ival	December 19, 2012	3	3:00	Las Vegas, Nevada, United States	Won the Amateur Tuff-N-Uff Strawweight Title.
Loss	3–2	Stephanie Gonzalez	Decision (split)	Momentum FC - Fight Night 3	January 28, 2012	3	2:00	Anaheim, California, United States	
Loss	3–1	Ashley Cummins	Submission (armbar)	Tuff-N-Uff - Future Stars of MMA	April 8, 2011	1	1:42	Las Vegas, Nevada, United States	For Amateur Tuff-N-Uff Strawweight Title.
Win	3–0	Diana Fowles	KO (punches)	Rage in the Cage 148	January 29, 2011	1	1:08	Chandler, Arizona, United States	
Win	2–0	Kathryn Davis	Decision (unanimous)	Ultimate Reno Combat 20	December 10, 2010	3	3:00	Reno, Nevada, United States	
Win	1–0	Amanda Lauland	Decision (unanimous)	Tuff-N-Uff	July 2, 2010	3	2:00	Las Vegas, Nevada, United States	

== Bare knuckle boxing record ==
Professional record breakdown
1 match	0 wins	1 loss
By knockout	0	1

Res.	Record	Opponent	Method	Event	Date	Round	Time	Location	Notes
Loss	0–1	Martyna Krol	TKO (doctor stoppage)	BKFC Fight Night Jackson: Brito vs. Harris II	January 29, 2022	3	2:00	Jackson, Mississippi, United States	
