= Sheldon Westcott =

Canadian mixed martial arts fighter

- Born: August 20, 1984 (age 42); Edmonton, Alberta, Canada
- Height: 6 ft 1 in (1.85 m)
- Weight: 170 lb (77 kg; 12 st 2 lb)
- Division: Middleweight; Welterweight
- Fighting out of: St. Albert, Alberta, Canada
- Team: Evolution of Fitness
- Rank: Black Belt (under Craig "Couchie" Malin)
- Years active: 2007–present

Mixed martial arts record
- Total: 13
- Wins: 9
- By knockout: 3
- By submission: 5
- By decision: 1
- Losses: 3
- By knockout: 1
- By decision: 2
- Draws: 1

Amateur record
- Total: 2
- Wins: 2
- By submission: 2

Other information
- Notable relatives: Wife Shelby Annicchiarico married (2026-Present) Son Hudson Westcott (2017-)
- Mixed martial arts record from Sherdog

Sheldon Westcott (born August 10, 1985) is a Canadian mixed martial artist who competes in the Welterweight division, and last fought in the Ultimate Fighting Championship (UFC). He is also known for being a contestant and finalist on The Ultimate Fighter for Team Canada.

== Mixed martial arts career ==
After losing his debut fight to Victor Bachmann in 2007, Wescott would go on to his next four fights, three of them were stopped in less than a minute. Sheldon was set to make his return to MFC to take on former King of the Cage Welterweight Champion Thomas Denny. They fought to split draw. The two would meet again at MFC 30, Wescott won via unanimous decision.

=== The Ultimate Fighter: Nations ===
After going 8-1 Westcott would be a cast member on The Ultimate Fighter Nations: Canada vs. Australia, representing Canada at middleweight.

Westcott first defeated Daniel Kelly via arm-triangle in round one to advance to the semi-final. Sheldon would advance to the finals after submitting Vik Grujic in the first round via guillotine choke.

=== Ultimate Fighting Championship ===
Westcott made his official debut facing one of his teammates, Elias Theodorou in the middleweight finals at The Ultimate Fighter Nations Finale. He lost via TKO in the second round.

Westcott was expected to face Alberto Mina on August 23, 2014, at UFC Fight Night 48. However, in the days leading up to the event, Westcott pulled out of the bout citing an injury and was replaced by Shinsho Anzai.

Westcott returned to the cage in April 2015 and faced Pawel Pawlak at UFC Fight Night 64. He lost via unanimous decision.

Westcott faced Edgar García on January 2, 2016, at UFC 195. He won via TKO in the first round.

Westcott was expected to face Alex Morono on February 4, 2017, at UFC Fight Night 104. However, Westcott pulled out of the fight in early January and was replaced by Niko Price.

Westcott was expected to face Danny Roberts on December 16, 2017, at UFC on Fox 26. However, Westcott was removed from the card for undisclosed reasons in early December and was replaced by Nordine Taleb.

== Championships and accomplishments ==
- Ultimate Fighting Championship
  - The Ultimate Fighter Nations: Canada vs. Australia Middleweight Tournament Runner-Up
  - The Ultimate Fighter Nations: Canada vs. Australia Performance of the Season

== Mixed martial arts record ==
Professional record breakdown
13 matches	9 wins	3 losses
By knockout	3	1
By submission	5	0
By decision	1	2
Draws	1	

Res.	Record	Opponent	Method	Event	Date	Round	Time	Location	Notes
Win	9–3–1	Edgar García	TKO (punches)	UFC 195	January 2, 2016	1	3:12	Las Vegas, Nevada, United States	
Loss	8–3–1	Pawel Pawlak	Decision (unanimous)	UFC Fight Night: Gonzaga vs. Cro Cop 2	April 11, 2015	3	5:00	Kraków, Poland	Return to Welterweight.
Loss	8–2–1	Elias Theodorou	TKO (punches and elbows)	The Ultimate Fighter Nations Finale: Bisping vs. Kennedy	April 16, 2014	2	4:41	Quebec City, Quebec, Canada	Lost The Ultimate Fighter: Nations Middleweight Tournament
Win	8–1–1	Aaron Shmyr	Submission (guillotine choke)	Fivestar Fight League 5	April 13, 2013	1	0:13	Yellowknife, Northwest Territories, Canada	
Win	7–1–1	Nic Herron-Webb	Decision (unanimous)	AFC 17: Anarchy	March 23, 2013	3	5:00	Edmonton, Alberta, Canada	
Win	6–1–1	Jay Jensen	Submission (guillotine choke)	AMMA 9: Ford vs. Goodall	February 11, 2012	1	0:26	Edmonton, Alberta, Canada	
Win	5–1–1	Thomas Denny	Decision (unanimous)	MFC 30: Up Close & Personal	June 10, 2011	3	5:00	Edmonton, Alberta, Canada	
Draw	4–1–1	Thomas Denny	Draw (split)	MFC 28: Supremacy	February 25, 2011	3	5:00	Enoch, Alberta, Canada	
Win	4–1	Simon Marini	Submission (guillotine choke)	AMMA 4: Victory	June 9, 2010	1	0:28	Edmonton, Alberta, Canada	
Win	3–1	Tim Smith	TKO (punches)	TFC 10: High Voltage	May 19, 2010	1	0:29	Edmonton, Alberta, Canada	
Win	2–1	Kyle Millberry	TKO (punches)	Heat XC 1	January 30, 2009	1	0:51	Edmonton, Alberta, Canada	
Win	1–1	Jeff Kilisolsky	Submission (guillotine choke)	MFC 18: Famous	September 28, 2008	1	3:33	Enoch, Alberta, Canada	
Loss	0–1	Victor Bachmann	Decision (split)	King of the Cage: Brawl in the Mall	August 17, 2007	3	5:00	Edmonton, Alberta, Canada	

=== Mixed martial arts exhibition record ===
Exhibition record breakdown		
2 matches	2 wins	0 losses
By knockout	0	0
By submission	2	0
By decision	0	0

Res.	Record	Opponent	Method	Event	Date	Round	Time	Location	Notes
Win	2–0	Vik Grujic	Submission (guillotine choke)	The Ultimate Fighter Nations: Canada vs. Australia	April 9, 2014 (airdate)	1	4:15	Quebec City, Quebec, Canada	Semi-finals.
Win	1–0	Dan Kelly	Submission (arm-triangle choke)	The Ultimate Fighter Nations: Canada vs. Australia	February 19, 2014 (airdate)	1	0:56	Quebec City, Quebec, Canada	Elimination Round.

== See also ==
- List of male mixed martial artists
- List of Canadian UFC fighters
