= UFC Fight Night: Holloway vs. Oliveira =

UFC mixed martial arts event in 2015

- The poster for UFC Fight Night: Holloway vs. Oliveira
- Promotion: Ultimate Fighting Championship
- Date: August 23, 2015
- Venue: SaskTel Centre
- City: Saskatoon, Saskatchewan, Canada
- Attendance: 7,202

Event chronology
UFC Fight Night: Teixeira vs. Saint Preux	UFC Fight Night: Holloway vs. Oliveira	UFC 191: Johnson vs. Dodson 2

UFC Fight Night: Holloway vs. Oliveira (also known as UFC Fight Night 74) was a mixed martial arts event held on August 23, 2015, at the SaskTel Centre in Saskatoon, Saskatchewan, Canada.

== Background ==
The event was the first that the organization has held in Saskatchewan and was headlined by a featherweight bout between rising stars Max Holloway and Charles Oliveira.

Two fights, Rick Story vs. Erick Silva and Marcos Rogério de Lima vs. Nikita Krylov were originally expected to take place at UFC Fight Night: Machida vs. Romero. However, on June 19, it was announced that several bouts would be postponed and moved to other events as international fighters experienced travel restrictions due to technical issues within the Bureau of Consular Affairs division of the U.S. State Department, which produces travel visas. The two pairings were left intact and were rescheduled for this event. On August 11, an injury forced Story out of the bout and Neil Magny stepped in to take his place. Magny had previously fought only 22 days before the event, when he was defeated by Demian Maia at UFC 190.

Chris Wade was expected to face Olivier Aubin-Mercier at the event. However, Wade pulled out of the bout in late July after sustaining an injury and was replaced by Tony Sims.

Sean O'Connell was expected to face UFC newcomer Misha Cirkunov at the event. However, O'Connell pulled out of the bout on August 11 due to undisclosed reasons and was replaced by another UFC newcomer in Daniel Jolly.

== Results ==
Main Card (Fox Sports 1)
Weight class				Method	Round	Time	Notes
Featherweight	Max Holloway	def.	Charles Oliveira	TKO (esophagus injury)	1	1:39	(Note: Oliveira appeared to have injured his neck/shoulder during the fight. Despite initial reports of follow-up exams revealing he suffered an esophagus micro-tear, the UFC later released a statement clarifying that Oliveira had no major injuries. Oliveira confirmed in an interview that he suffered a minor neck injury, related to a previous injury from his training camp. It will not require surgery.)
Welterweight	Neil Magny	def.	Erick Silva	Decision (split) (28–29, 29–28, 30–27)	3	5:00
Welterweight	Patrick Côté	def.	Josh Burkman	TKO (punches)	3	1:26
Lightweight	Francisco Trinaldo	def.	Chad Laprise	TKO (punches)	1	2:43
Lightweight	Olivier Aubin-Mercier	def.	Tony Sims	Decision (unanimous) (30–27, 30–27, 29–28)	3	5:00
Women's Strawweight	Valérie Létourneau	def.	Maryna Moroz	Decision (unanimous) (29–28, 29–28, 30–27)	3	5:00
Preliminary Card (Fox Sports 1)
Lightweight	Frankie Perez	def.	Sam Stout	TKO (punches)	1	0:54
Bantamweight	Felipe Arantes	def.	Yves Jabouin	Submission (armbar)	1	4:21
Light Heavyweight	Nikita Krylov	def.	Marcos Rogério de Lima	Submission (rear-naked choke)	1	2:29
Flyweight	Chris Kelades	def.	Chris Beal	Decision (split) (27–30, 29–28, 29–28)	3	5:00
Preliminary Card (UFC Fight Pass)
Lightweight	Shane Campbell	def.	Elias Silvério	Decision (unanimous) (29–28, 29–28, 29–28)	3	5:00
Light Heavyweight	Misha Cirkunov	def.	Daniel Jolly	KO (punches)	1	4:45

== Bonus awards ==
The following fighters were awarded $50,000 bonuses:

- Fight of the Night: Patrick Côté vs. Josh Burkman
- Performance of the Night: Frankie Perez and Felipe Arantes

== See also ==
- List of UFC events
- 2015 in UFC
