= Thibault Gouti =

French mixed martial arts fighter

- Born: Thibault Gouti; February 27, 1987 (age 39); Toulouse, France
- Other names: GT
- Height: 5 ft 10 in (1.78 m)
- Weight: 155 lb (70 kg; 11 st 1 lb)
- Division: Lightweight; Welterweight
- Reach: 73 in (185 cm)
- Fighting out of: Albuquerque, New Mexico, United States
- Team: Jacksonwink MMA Academy
- Trainer: Abdel Toumi; Greg Jackson; Mike Winkeljohn
- Years active: 2011–present

Mixed martial arts record
- Total: 24
- Wins: 17
- By knockout: 7
- By submission: 6
- By decision: 4
- Losses: 7
- By knockout: 1
- By submission: 2
- By decision: 4

Other information
- Mixed martial arts record from Sherdog

Thibault Gouti (born February 27, 1987) is a French mixed martial artist who competes in the Lightweight division. A professional since 2011, he has also competed in the UFC and for Bellator MMA

== Mixed martial arts career ==
=== Early career ===
Gouti has amassed a record of 11–0 prior signed by UFC with notable win over former UFC fighter Anton Kuivanen.

=== The Ultimate Fighter 22 ===
Gouti was selected as one of the contestants on The Ultimate Fighter 22 in 2015 and he lost during the entry round by split decision.

=== Ultimate Fighting Championship ===
On February 27, 2016, Gouti faced Teemu Packalen, replacing Łukasz Sajewski, at his UFC debut at UFC Fight Night: Silva vs. Bisping. He lost the fight in the first round.

His next fight came four months later on June 18, 2016, facing Olivier Aubin-Mercier, at UFC Fight Night: MacDonald vs. Thompson. He lost the fight via submission in round three.

Gouti faced Chad Laprise on August 27 at UFC on Fox: Maia vs. Condit and lost via a technical knocked out.

Gouti was expected to face Dong Hyun Kim on June 11 at UFC Fight Night: Lewis vs. Hunt. However, the bout was cancelled due to fall ill on the day of the fight.

At his third fight in UFC, Gouti was up against Andrew Holbrook on September 2, 2017 and secured his first UFC win at UFC Fight Night: Volkov vs Struve.

Gouti faced Sage Northcutt on February 18, 2018, at UFC Fight Night 126. He lost the fight by unanimous decision.

Gouti faced Nasrat Haqparast on October 27, 2018, at UFC Fight Night 138. He lost the fight via unanimous decision. This fight earned him the Fight of the Night award.

Since his last bout, Gouti was released from his UFC contract.

=== Post UFC ===
Gouti faced Mehdi Baghdad for the LTDE Super Lightweight belt on July 2, 2021, at Trophee des Etoiles 15. Gouti won the bout via TKO in the first round.

He then faced Ghiles Oudelha at French Fighting Championship 1 on September 25, 2021. He won the fight via split decision.

He was expected to face Emil Weber Meek at Ares FC 2 on 11 December 2021. Gouti however pulled out of the bout due to injury.

Gouti faced Abner Lloveras on March 12, 2022, at War of Titans 2. He won the bout via TKO stoppage in the first round.

=== Bellator MMA ===
Gouti faced Lewis Long on May 6, 2022, at Bellator 280. He won the bout via unanimous decision.

After the victory, Gouti was signed to a multi-fight deal.

Gouti faced Alfie Davis on October 29, 2022, at Bellator 287. He lost the bout via unanimous decision.

Gouti faced Kane Mousah on May 12, 2023, at Bellator 296. He won the fight via knockout in the second round.

Gouti faced Archie Colgan on May 17, 2024 at Bellator Champions Series 2. At weigh-ins, Gouti came in at 157.7 pounds, 1.7 pounds over the lightweight non-title limit. His bout proceeded at catchweight and he was fined a percent of his purse which went to his opponent. He lost the fight via unanimous decision.

== Submission grappling career ==
Gouti will face Guillaume Chane in the main event of ADXC 9 on April 19, 2025.

== Championships and accomplishments ==
- Ultimate Fighting Championship
  - Fight of the Night (One time) vs. Nasrat Haqparast

== Personal life ==
Gouti was a competitive squash player who ranked 191 in the world in 2006.

Gouti's nickname "GT" is his initials spelled backwards.

Gouti earned a bachelor's degree in France.

== Mixed martial arts record ==
Professional record breakdown
24 matches	17 wins	7 losses
By knockout	7	1
By submission	6	2
By decision	4	4

Res.	Record	Opponent	Method	Event	Date	Round	Time	Location	Notes
Loss	17–7	Archie Colgan	Decision (unanimous)	Bellator Champions Series 2	17 May 2024	3	5:00	Paris, France	Catchweight (157.7 lb) bout; Gouti missed weight.
Win	17–6	Kane Mousah	KO (punch)	Bellator 296	12 May 2023	2	3:59	Paris, France	
Loss	16–6	Alfie Davis	Decision (unanimous)	Bellator 287	29 October 2022	3	5:00	Milan, Italy	
Win	16–5	Lewis Long	Decision (unanimous)	Bellator 280	6 May 2022	3	5:00	Paris, France	Welterweight bout.
Win	15–5	Abner Lloveras	TKO (punches)	War of Titans 2	12 March 2022	1	2:49	Madrid, Spain	Catchweight (165 lb) bout.
Win	14–5	Ghiles Oudelha	Decision (split)	French Fighting Championship 1	25 September 2021	3	5:00	Miramas, France	
Win	13–5	Mehdi Baghdad	TKO (punches)	Trophee des Etoiles 15	2 July 2021	1	N/A	Aix-en-Provence, France	Won the LTDE Super Lightweight Championship.
Loss	12–5	Nasrat Haqparast	Decision (unanimous)	UFC Fight Night: Volkan vs. Smith	27 October 2018	3	5:00	Moncton, New Brunswick, Canada	Fight of the Night.
Loss	12–4	Sage Northcutt	Decision (unanimous)	UFC Fight Night: Cowboy vs. Medeiros	18 February 2018	3	5:00	Austin, Texas, United States	
Win	12–3	Andrew Holbrook	TKO (punches)	UFC Fight Night: Volkov vs. Struve	2 September 2017	1	4:28	Rotterdam, Netherlands	
Loss	11–3	Chad Laprise	TKO (punches)	UFC on Fox: Maia vs. Condit	27 August 2016	1	1:36	Vancouver, British Columbia, Canada	
Loss	11–2	Olivier Aubin-Mercier	Submission (rear-naked choke)	UFC Fight Night: MacDonald vs. Thompson	18 June 2016	3	2:28	Ottawa, Ontario, Canada	
Loss	11–1	Teemu Packalén	Submission (rear-naked choke)	UFC Fight Night: Silva vs. Bisping	27 February 2016	1	0:24	London, England	
Win	11–0	Anton Kuivanen	KO (punch)	Cage 33	21 November 2015	3	1:08	Helsinki, Finland	Won Cage Lightweight Championship
Win	10–0	Mikael Nyyssönen	KO (punches)	Cage 27	28 February 2015	1	0:53	Helsinki, Finland	Lightweight debut
Win	9–0	Cedric Severac	Submission (anaconda choke)	Gladiator Fighting Arena	10 May 2014	2	1:32	Nimes, France	Won GFA Welterweight Championship
Win	8–0	Ramon Boixader	TKO (punches)	Gladiator Fighting Arena	10 May 2014	1	1:23	Nimes, France	
Win	7–0	Jorge Giner	Submission (rear-naked choke)	PFC 6	12 April 2014	1	2:32	Marseille, France	
Win	6–0	Sofiane Benchohra	Decision (unanimous)	Fightway Challenge 8	1 March 2014	2	5:00	Marseille, France	
Win	5–0	Baptiste Atcher	Submission (rear-naked choke)	PFC: Challengers 6	23 January 2014	1	1:32	Marseille, France	
Win	4–0	Mikhail Zapoulaev	Submission (triangle choke)	PFC 5: Clash of the Titans	27 April 2013	1	4:13	Marseille, France	
Win	3–0	Mohamed Bekadar	Submission (rear-naked choke)	Fightway Challenge 7	2 March 2013	1	2:34	Marseille, France	
Win	2–0	Jeremy Alary	Decision (unanimous)	Fight Impact	26 January 2013	2	5:00	Alzonne, France	
Win	1–0	Damien Velours	Submission (rear-naked choke)	PFC: Challengers 4	18 December 2011	2	1:04	Marseille, France	

== See also ==
- List of male mixed martial artists
