= UFC Fight Night: MacDonald vs. Thompson =

UFC mixed martial arts event in 2016

- The poster for UFC Fight Night: MacDonald vs. Thompson
- Promotion: Ultimate Fighting Championship
- Date: June 18, 2016
- Venue: TD Place Arena
- City: Ottawa, Ontario, Canada
- Attendance: 10,490
- Total gate: $1,278,250

Event chronology
UFC 199: Rockhold vs Bisping 2	UFC Fight Night: MacDonald vs. Thompson	UFC Fight Night: dos Anjos vs. Alvarez

UFC Fight Night: MacDonald vs. Thompson, also known as UFC Fight Night 89, was a mixed martial arts event held on June 18, 2016, at TD Place Arena in Ottawa, Ontario, Canada.

== Background ==
The event was the first that the promotion has hosted in Ottawa.

The card was headlined by a welterweight bout between former UFC Welterweight Championship challenger Rory MacDonald and five-time kickboxing world champion Stephen Thompson.

This event marked the promotion's inaugural fight in the women's flyweight division as former UFC Women's Strawweight Championship challenger Valérie Létourneau faced Joanne Calderwood. Despite that, a formal introduction of the division wasn't made since promotion officials are still determining whether or not to permanently add the division.

Norifumi Yamamoto was scheduled to face Chris Beal at the event. However, Yamamoto was pulled from the bout on May 26 due to an undisclosed injury and was replaced by former Bellator Featherweight Champion and one time UFC Bantamweight Championship challenger Joe Soto.

Alex Garcia was scheduled to face Colby Covington, but pulled out on June 9 due to undisclosed reasons and was replaced by promotional newcomer Jonathan Meunier.

Randa Markos missed weight on her first attempt at the weigh ins, coming in at 117.5 lb. She was given additional time to make the weight limit, but made no attempts to cut further. Instead, she was fined 20 percent of her fight purse, which went to Jocelyn Jones-Lybarger.

== Results ==
Main Card (Fox Sports 1)
Weight class				Method	Round	Time	Notes
Welterweight	Stephen Thompson	def.	Rory MacDonald	Decision (unanimous) (50–45, 50–45, 48–47)	5	5:00
Welterweight	Donald Cerrone	def.	Patrick Côté	TKO (punches)	3	2:35
Light Heavyweight	Steve Bossé	def.	Sean O'Connell	Decision (unanimous) (29–28, 29–28, 29–27)	3	5:00
Lightweight	Olivier Aubin-Mercier	def.	Thibault Gouti	Submission (rear-naked choke)	3	2:28
Women's Flyweight	Joanne Calderwood	def.	Valérie Létourneau	TKO (body kick and punches)	3	2:51
Preliminary Card (Fox Sports 2)
Lightweight	Jason Saggo	def.	Leandro Silva	Decision (split) (28–29, 29–28, 29–28)	3	5:00
Light Heavyweight	Misha Cirkunov	def.	Ion Cuțelaba	Submission (arm-triangle choke)	3	1:22
Middleweight	Krzysztof Jotko	def.	Tamdan McCrory	KO (punch)	1	0:59
Bantamweight	Joe Soto	def.	Chris Beal	Submission (rear-naked choke)	3	3:39
Preliminary Card (UFC Fight Pass)
Middleweight	Elias Theodorou	def.	Sam Alvey	Decision (unanimous) (29–28, 30–27, 30–27)	3	5:00
Catchweight (117.5 lb)	Randa Markos	def.	Jocelyn Jones-Lybarger	Decision (unanimous) (30–27, 29–28, 29–28)	3	5:00
Welterweight	Colby Covington	def.	Jonathan Meunier	Submission (rear-naked choke)	3	0:54
Flyweight	Ali Bagautinov	def.	Geane Herrera	Decision (unanimous) (30–27, 30–27, 30–27)	3	5:00

== Bonus awards ==
The following fighters were awarded $50,000 bonuses:

- Fight of the Night: Steve Bossé vs. Sean O'Connell
- Performance of the Night: Donald Cerrone and Krzysztof Jotko

== See also ==
- List of UFC events
- 2016 in UFC
