= The Ultimate Fighter Nations: Canada vs. Australia =

UFC mixed martial arts television series and event in 2014

- Genre: Reality, Sports
- Created by: Frank Fertitta III, Lorenzo Fertitta, Dana White
- Starring: Dana White, Patrick Côté, Kyle Noke
- Country of origin: Canada

Production
- Running time: 60 minutes

Original release
- Network: FX Australia, Fox Sports 1, Sportsnet 360
- Release: January 15 – April 9, 2014

The Ultimate Fighter Nations: Canada vs. Australia is an installment of the Ultimate Fighting Championship (UFC)-produced reality television series The Ultimate Fighter. It is the fifth series produced outside the United States and the first filmed in Canada.

The series was officially announced by the UFC in June 2013. The coaches were announced as Patrick Côté representing Canada and Kyle Noke representing Australia. This marked the second time, following The Ultimate Fighter: The Smashes, that two former contestants from The Ultimate Fighter show are both coaches. Tryouts were held in September 2013 in Sydney and Toronto. Fighters were chosen in the middleweight and welterweight divisions. The 16 fighters each competed in a single-elimination tournament, with the two division winners crowned in finale bouts that took place on April 16, 2014.

The show debuted on January 15, 2014. This season is the second to air on FX Australia. It also aired in the United States on Fox Sports 1.

The TUF Nations Finale was held in Quebec City, Quebec on April 16, 2014.

== Cast ==
=== Coaches ===
Team Canada

- Patrick Côté, Head Coach
- Kru Ash, Striking Coach
- Fábio Holanda, Jiu Jitsu Coach
- David Zilberman, Wrestling Coach

Team Australia

- Kyle Noke, Head Coach
- Israel Martinez, Wrestling Coach
- Adrian Pang, Striking Coach
- Roberto Tussa, Jiu Jitsu Coach

=== Fighters ===
- Team Canada
  - Welterweights: Olivier Aubin-Mercier, Matthew Desroches, Kajan Johnson, and Chad Laprise.
  - Middleweights: Luke Harris, Nordine Taleb, Elias Theodorou, and Sheldon Westcott.
- Team Australia
  - Welterweights: Chris Indich, Jake Matthews, Brendan O’Reilly, and Richard Walsh.
  - Middleweights: Vik Grujic, Daniel Kelly, Tyler Manawaroa, and Zein Saliba.

== Episodes ==
Episode 1 – Strangers in a Strange Land: (January 15, 2014)

- The fighters enter the Ultimate Fighter training centre in Quebec City, Quebec, Canada and shortly after both coaches arrive. Côté has the coin to decide the first fight pick with him but after he says that he feels pretty confident looking at his team, he hands it over to Noke. He flips the coin and Team Canada wins it. Côté reminds that they have the first fight pick and will announce it in a couple of days. He also reminds everyone to enjoy this "once in a lifetime opportunity".
- During a cutscene Dana White announces that fighters could receive $25,000 for Knockout of the Season, Submission of the Season and Fight of the Season. Also there's a $5,000 bonus for finishes in every fight.
- Both coaches share some of their experience as former contenders on The Ultimate Fighter to their respective teams.
- The fighters meet the house and it has a distinctly Canadian feeling, as the structure is made almost entirely of wood and is located in a remote area of Quebec City.
- The Australian fighters are having a hard time with the long travel and different time zone from their home.
- The fighters meet White for the first time during a video conference via Xbox One. The first fight pick is announced by Côté and it is Team Canada's Kajan Johnson vs. Team Australia's Brendan O’Reilly. Johnson wanted to fight first even before he met Côté.
- During the night, the Canadian fighters discuss about their opponents records and experience but the Australians could hear everything from their bedrooms and O'Reilly confronts them about what they just said.
- Johnson mentions a couple of injuries he has and states that he always fight injured but even in that situation he states that he is more dangerous than anybody else there.
- Kajan Johnson defeated Brendan O’Reilly via submission (rear-naked choke) in round 1.
- Côté chooses the next match-up: Team Canada's Elias Theodorou vs. Team Australia's Zein Saliba.

Episode 2 – Bad Hair Day: (January 22, 2014)

- The Canadians have a good time at the house and they mention that Johnson's victory helped bring them close together.
- Taleb decides to call a private meeting for team Canada after he sees some of his teammates telling information about their own skills and records to the Australians.
- MMA fighter and four-time Brazilian jiu-jitsu world champion Vítor Ribeiro is invited as a guest coach for team Canada and does a special session with the fighters.
- Salibas mentions that he knows nothing about his opponent and Theodorou takes a moment to talk about his career as a model and actor besides fighting.
- Team Canada holds a dinner for Côté and the other coaches, including Côté's nutritionist Jean-François Gaudreau. They all have a conversation about how important nutrition is to an elite fighter.
- It's Kelly's birthday and his coaches bring him a cake to celebrate it. After Noke pranks Kelly and food fight starts after that between the whole team.
- Elias Theodorou defeated Zein Saliba via unanimous decision in two rounds.
- Côté chooses the next match-up: Team Canada's Chad Laprise vs. Team Australia's Chris Indich.

Episode 3 – The Bible Thumper: (January 29, 2014)

- Early in the morning Manawaroa uses a didgeridoo to annoy the Canadians and he's successful, especially with Taleb.
- Strength and conditioning coach Jonathan Chaimberg, who is Canadian, shows up to help Team Australia. He used to train with Laprise and Taleb from the other team and he's there to help Noke. Côté mentions that Chaimberg is "so full of himself" that he might not even care about his ties to other fighters in the opposite team. As Chaimberg thought, most of the fighters struggle post-training with the intense pace. After the training ends, Team Canada arrives for their training session and meet with Chaimberg. Some of them later discuss their opinions on the subject.
- Indich talks about his relationship with his dad in the past and how it affected him. Meanwhile, Laprise claims this will be the first time in his career where he's been completely injury-free. He talks about his road in the sport up to TUF and how his strong religious beliefs serve as motivation to succeed.
- Manawaroa has some problems with an injured finger and his weight. The coaches are concerned about it and try to make him motivated to train hard and also make weight.
- Indich says he feels the pressure to not only get the win for himself, but to get the first victory for his team and change the mood around them.
- Chad Laprise defeated Chris Indich via unanimous decision in two rounds. Indich's performance was praised by everyone after their fight.
- Côté chooses the next match-up: Team Canada's Nordine Taleb vs. Team Australia's Tyler Manawaroa.

Episode 4: (February 5, 2014)

- Following last episode's fight, Indich and Taleb have a discussion in front of the Australian team regarding comments the Canadians said about Indich not being able to take a punch and that this series would be the first one to feature a team winning 8–0 in quarterfinal fights. Later in the house is visible that the Laprise-Indich fight brought both teams closer in terms of respect, specially towards Indich.
- Taleb and his teammates all believe that regardless of Manawaroa's record, Taleb's previous opponents were better than his current foe and they all believe he has the better skills. Meanwhile, the Australians believe that their teammate will give them the first win and Manawaroa is ready for it.
- Both fighters have an intense stare down after the weigh-in.
- Tyler Manawaroa defeated Nordine Taleb via unanimous decision in three rounds.
- In a hospital waiting for exams, Taleb and Manawaroa debate their strategies for the fight and they agree that this fight will probably be the fight of the season.
- Noke chooses the next match-up: Team Australia's Richard Walsh vs. Team Canada's Matthew Desroches.

Episode 5: (February 12, 2014)

- The fighters are talking about the shift in momentum in the competition after Team Australia finally earned a victory.
- Taleb and Manawaroa decide to blow off some steam together at the house in the form of a drinking competition.
- At the next Team Canada training session, Côté tries to boost his team's morale after suffering its first loss of the season. Deroches receives personal attention from the coaching staff as he readies for his upcoming fight.
- Walsh stresses the importance of building off Manawaroa's victory and helping his team get back in the competition.
- During training, Noke and Martinez discuss about Kelly's resilience during training considering that he has injuries on his ankles and feet.
- Despite a broken foot, Taleb remains on the team and helps his teammates with training and advising. He became an unofficial "fifth coach". Later Westcott injuries his knee during a sparring session against Theodorou and Team Canada is worried that it might affect his usual gameplan. They assure that they need to win the next fight to make sure they have the last middleweight fight picks.
- Richard Walsh defeated Matthew Desroches via unanimous decision in two rounds.
- Noke chooses the next match-up: Team Australia's Daniel Kelly vs. Team Canada's Sheldon Westcott.

Episode 6: (February 19, 2014)

- After Walsh's victory, Kelly explains that the Canadians seem nicer now that they've suffered defeats.
- Chad Laprise expresses desire to fight Richard Walsh, a fight that Kajan Johnson wants as well.
- During training, Côté is absent and his assistant coaches take over the session.
- Jake Matthews suffers through a stomach ache during training, but assistant coach Israel Martinez shows no remorse and gives Matthews a hard time.
- At the house, the fighters are treated to snacks and beer with a viewing of UFC 167.
- Daniel Kelly reveals that his son is suffering from a rare diseases called cystinosis and that a kidney transplant, along with being financially stable is something Kelly wants to produce for his family.
- Sheldon Westcott defeated Daniel Kelly via submission (arm triangle choke) in round 1.
- It was revealed that Kelly had injured his right knee during the fight and is taken off to the hospital for treatment.
- Côté announces the final preliminary welterweight matchup: Team Canada's Olivier Aubin-Mercier vs Team Australia's Jake Matthews.

Episode 7:

- Olivier Aubin-Mercier defeated Jake Matthews via unanimous decision after 2 rounds.

Episode 8:

- Vik Grujic defeated Luke Harris via KO (elbows) in round 1.

Episode 9:

- recap episode

Episode 10:

- Chad Laprise defeated Kajan Johnson via KO (punch) in round 2.

Episode 11:

- Elias Theodorou defeated Tyler Manawaroa via unanimous decision after 3 rounds.

Episode 12:

- Olivier Aubin-Mercier defeated Richard Walsh via submission (rear naked choke) in round 1.

Episode 13:

- Sheldon Westcott defeated Vik Grujic via submission (side choke) in round 1.

== Tournament bracket ==
=== Welterweight bracket ===
Elimination Round
(Canada) Kajan Johnson	SUB
(Australia) Brendan O'Reilly	1
(Canada) Chad Laprise	UD
(Australia) Chris Indich	2
(Canada) Matthew Desroches	2
(Australia) Richard Walsh	UD
(Canada) Olivier Aubin-Mercier	UD
(Australia) Jake Matthews	2

Semi-finals
(Canada) Kajan Johnson	2
(Canada) Chad Laprise	KO
(Australia) Richard Walsh	1
(Canada) Olivier Aubin-Mercier	SUB

Finale
(Canada) Chad Laprise	SD
(Canada) Olivier Aubin-Mercier	3

=== Middleweight bracket ===
Elimination Round
(Canada) Elias Theodorou	UD
(Australia) Zein Saliba	2
(Canada) Nordine Taleb	3
(Australia) Tyler Manawaroa	UD
(Canada) Sheldon Westcott	SUB
(Australia) Daniel Kelly	1
(Canada) Luke Harris	1
(Australia) Vik Grujic	TKO

Semi-finals
(Canada) Elias Theodorou	UD
(Australia) Tyler Manawaroa	3
(Canada) Sheldon Westcott	SUB
(Australia) Vik Grujic	1

Finale
(Canada) Elias Theodorou	TKO
(Canada) Sheldon Westcott	2

Legend
(Canada)	Team Canada
(Australia)	Team Australia
UD	Unanimous Decision
SD	Split Decision
SUB	Submission
(T)KO	(Technical) Knock Out

=== Bonus awards ===
The following $25,000 bonus were awarded to fights that took place during the TUF Nations season:

- Fight of the Season: Chad Laprise vs. Chris Indich
- Performance of the Season: Chad Laprise (knockout of Kajan Johnson) and Sheldon Westcott (submission of Vik Grujic)

== The Ultimate Fighter Nations Finale: Bisping vs. Kennedy ==
The Ultimate Fighter Nations Finale: Bisping vs. Kennedy
- The poster for The Ultimate Fighter Nations Finale: Bisping vs. Kennedy
- Promotion: Ultimate Fighting Championship
- Date: April 16, 2014
- Venue: Colisée Pepsi
- City: Quebec City, Quebec, Canada
- Attendance: 5,029
- Total gate: $340,000

Event chronology
UFC Fight Night: Nogueira vs. Nelson	The Ultimate Fighter Nations Finale: Bisping vs. Kennedy	UFC on Fox: Werdum vs. Browne

The Ultimate Fighter Nations Finale: Bisping vs. Kennedy (also known as UFC Fight Night: Bisping vs. Kennedy) was a mixed martial arts event held by the Ultimate Fighting Championship on April 16, 2014, at Colisée Pepsi in Quebec City, Quebec, Canada.

=== Background ===
The event was headlined by a middleweight bout between Michael Bisping and Tim Kennedy. Also featured on the card were the welterweight and middleweight finals of The Ultimate Fighter Nations: Canada vs. Australia and the coaches bout between Patrick Côté and Kyle Noke.

Steve Bossé was expected to make his UFC debut against Ryan Jimmo at this event. However, Bossé was forced to pull out of the bout citing an injury. He was replaced by UFC newcomer Sean O'Connell.

A bantamweight bout between Alex Caceres and Erik Pérez was briefly linked to this event, but never materialized.

Shayna Baszler was originally scheduled to make her UFC debut on this card against Sarah Kaufman. However, she had to pull out of the bout due to injury and was briefly replaced by Amanda Nunes. Five days later, Nunes also pulled out of the bout with a thumb injury. Kaufman instead fought Leslie Smith in a rematch from their bout at Invicta FC 5: Penne vs. Waterson which ended in a controversial split decision.

Evan Dunham was expected to face Mark Bocek at the event. However, Dunham pulled out of the bout in the week leading up to the event with an undisclosed injury. Bocek instead faced UFC newcomer Mike De La Torre at the event.

An expected lightweight fight between Sam Stout and K. J. Noons was changed to a welterweight match up the week of the fight per the request of the fighters.

=== Results ===
Fight card (Fox Sports 1)
Weight class				Method	Round	Time	Notes
Middleweight	Tim Kennedy	def.	Michael Bisping	Decision (unanimous) (49–46, 49–46, 50–45)	5	5:00
Welterweight	Patrick Côté	def.	Kyle Noke	Decision (unanimous) (29–28, 29–28, 30–27)	3	5:00
Middleweight	Elias Theodorou	def.	Sheldon Westcott	TKO (punches and elbows)	2	4:41	(Note: The Ultimate Fighter Nations Middleweight Final)
Welterweight	Chad Laprise	def.	Olivier Aubin-Mercier	Decision (split) (28–29, 29–28, 30–27)	3	5:00	(Note: The Ultimate Fighter Nations Welterweight Final)
Featherweight	Dustin Poirier	def.	Akira Corassani	TKO (punches)	2	0:42
Preliminary card (Fox Sports 1)
Welterweight	K. J. Noons	def.	Sam Stout	KO (punches)	1	0:30
Women's Bantamweight	Sarah Kaufman	def.	Leslie Smith	Decision (unanimous) (30–27, 30–27, 30–27)	3	5:00
Light Heavyweight	Ryan Jimmo	def.	Sean O'Connell	KO (punches)	1	4:27
Bantamweight	George Roop	def.	Dustin Kimura	Decision (unanimous) (29–28, 30–27, 29–26)	3	5:00
Preliminary card (UFC Fight Pass)
Lightweight	Mark Bocek	def.	Mike De La Torre	Decision (split) (28–29, 30–27, 29–28)	3	5:00
Middleweight	Nordine Taleb	def.	Vik Grujic	Decision (unanimous) (30–27, 30–27, 30–27)	3	5:00
Welterweight	Richard Walsh	def.	Chris Indich	Decision (unanimous) (30–27, 30–27, 30–27)	3	5:00
Bantamweight	Mitch Gagnon	def.	Tim Gorman	Decision (unanimous) (30–27, 30–27, 30–27)	3	5:00

=== Bonus awards ===
The following fighters received $50,000 bonuses:

- Fight of the Night: Dustin Poirier vs. Akira Corassani
- Performance of the Night: K. J. Noons and Ryan Jimmo

== See also ==
- 2014 in UFC
- List of UFC events
- Mixed martial arts in Australia
