= List of Canadian UFC fighters =

Ultimate Fighting Championship

The Ultimate Fighting Championship (UFC) is a mixed martial arts (MMA) promotion, founded in 1993 by Art Davie and Rorion Gracie. The organization was purchased from its parent company SEG in 2001 by Zuffa LLC, a promotional company owned by Las Vegas casino magnates, Lorenzo and Frank Fertitta and managed by Dana White (current president of operations). Since its inception, and through its current Zuffa management, the UFC has remained one of the more dominant MMA promotions in the world, playing host to a wide field of MMA fighters.

This list provides an up-to-date roster of all fighters that represent Canada competing or have previously competed under the UFC promotional banner. (Note: Unless otherwise cited, all fighters listed are retrieved from ufc.com.) (Note: All names presented are in accordance with UFC.com profiles and may include common nicknames or alternative spellings rather than birth names.) Fighters are organized by weight class and within their weight class by their number of appearances inside the UFC. Fighter record and notable wins, achievements. Tournament participation and overall Canadian UFC/MMA records (Note: Unless otherwise cited, all records are retrieved from sherdog.com.)

World Extreme Cagefighting (WEC) was purchased by Zuffa in 2006 and officially merged under the UFC brand on January 1, 2011. All former WEC fighters have had their WEC record listed in place of their UFC record, starting with WEC 25 (the first WEC event under Zuffa). These records have been, and will be, continued as former WEC fighters move on in the UFC. (Note: All asterisked fighters are listed by a combination of their UFC and WEC records.)

Strikeforce was purchased by Zuffa in 2011 and officially merged under the UFC brand on January 12, 2013. All former Strikeforce fighters have had their Strikeforce record listed in place of their UFC record, starting with Strikeforce Challengers: Wilcox vs. Damm (the first Strikeforce event under Zuffa). These records have been, and will be, continued as former Strikeforce fighters move on in the UFC. (Note: All double asterisked fighters are listed by a combination of their UFC and Strikeforce records.)

Each fight record has four categories: wins, losses, draws, and no-contests (NC). All fight records in this article are displayed in that order, with fights resulting in a no-contest listed in parentheses.

== Heavyweights (265 lb, 120 kg) ==
- **Bold** indicated fighter is still active on the UFC roster.

ISO	Name	Nickname	UFC record	MMA record	Events	Notes	Notable Wins	Ref.
CAN	Harold Howard		1–2	1–3	UFC 3 UFC 7	*First Canadian to fight in the promotion making his debut at UFC 3; *UFC 3 Finalist but lost to Steve Jennum; *UFC 7 Quarter-finalist but lost to Mark Hall; *Canadian MMA Pioneer; *Only UFC fighter execute a scissor-flip kick during his fight with Steve Jennum.	Roland Payne	
CAN	Jason Fairn	Bonecracker	0–1	4–5	UFC 4	*UFC 4 Competitor, lost to future UFC 13 Middleweight Tournament Champion Guy Mezger; *The fight between the two was at the time a milestone, as it saw the first pre-fight agreement of rules between two fighters(not to pull each others hair), this being during the time period were the sport possessed little unspoken rules and literally no official rules *Canadian MMA Pioneer	Mark Tullius	
CAN	Dave Beneteau	Dangerous	3–3	6–5–1	UFC 5 UFC 6 Ultimate Ultimate 1995; UFC 15	*Two-time UFC Tournament Finalist; *UFC 5 Finalist but lost to Dan Severn; *UFC 15 Heavyweight Tournament Finalist but had to pull out due to injury *Quarter-finalist in 2 other UFC Tournaments; *UVTP 4 Tournament Semi-finalist; *Canadian MMA pioneer	Patrick Smith; Carlos Barreto	
CAN	Gary Goodridge	Big Daddy	4–4	23–22–1	UFC 8 UFC 9 UFC 10; Ultimate Ultimate 1996; UFC 19	*UFC 8 Finalist but lost to Don Frye; *UFC 10 tournament Semi-finalist; *IVC 1st I.V.C Tournament champion *2005 K-1 World Grand Prix in Hawaii champion *One of Six Canadians to fight in Pride FC; *Canadian MMA pioneer	Don Frye; Oleg Taktarov; Valentijn Overeem; Dan Bobish; Lloyd van Dams; Mike Bernardo(K-1); Jan Nortje(2); Sylvester Terkay; Alan Karaev	
CAN	Icho Larenas	El Dogo	0–1	6–6	UFC 58	*Former TKO World Heavyweight Champion; *All of his wins have come via KO/TKO; *Only made one appearance in the promotion in a losing effort at UFC 58	Steve Bossé	
CAN	Tim Hague	The Thrashing Machine	1–4	21–13	UFC 98; UFC 102; UFC 109; UFC 113; UFC FN 23	*KOTC Canada Heavyweight Champion(2 defenses); *Former Unified MMA Heavyweight Champion; *Former XFFC Heavyweight Champion; *Possessed a 90% finish rate(15 knockouts/4 submissions); *Hague died on June 18, 2017, from injuries he sustained in a boxing match with Adam Braidwood	Pat Barry; Kalib Starnes; Tanner Boser; Travis Wiuff; Zak Jensen; Sherman Pendergarst	
USA	Brock Lesnar		4–3 (1 NC) (representing Canada once)	5–3 (1 NC) (representing Canada once)	UFC 81; UFC 87; UFC 91; UFC 100; UFC 116; UFC 121; UFC 141; UFC 200(CAN)	*While not a Canadian by birth, Brock Lesnar is a current resident of Canada and possesses a Dual citizenship, He represented Canada for a single fight at UFC 200(American flag was switched out for Canadian flag). He fought out of Regina, Saskatchewan. *Former UFC Heavyweight Champion(2 defenses); *Submission of the Night(1)	Frank Mir; Shane Carwin; Mark Hunt; Randy Couture; Heath Herring	
CAN	Arjan Bhullar		3–1	11–2	UFC 215; UFC on Fox 29; UFC FN 138; UFC FN 151	*Former ONE FC Heavyweight Champion; *Former BFL Heavyweight Champion *possessed a 7 fight win-streak	Juan Adams; Brandon Vera	
CAN	Tanner Boser	The Bulldozer	5–5	21–10–1	UFC on ESPN 6 UFC FN 165; UFC on ESPN 12; UFC on ESPN 14; UFC on ESPN 17; UFC FN 189; UFC FN 190; UFC FN 210; UFC on ESPN 44; UFC on ESPN 50	*Performance of the Night (1); *Formerly ranked #15 in the UFC Heavyweight division *UFC Veteran with 10 fights in the promotion *Former Two-time Unified MMA Heavyweight Champion(3 defences); *Has 11 wins via KO/TKO; *Possessed a 6 fight win-streak	Ovince Saint Preux; Raphael Pessoa; Philipe Lins; Tim Hague; Daniel Spitz; Victor Valimaki; Aleksa Camur	

== Light Heavyweights (205 lb, 93 kg) ==
- **Bold** indicated fighter is still active on the UFC roster.

ISO	Name	Nickname	UFC record	MMA record	Events	Notes	Notable Wins	Ref.
CAN	Joe Doerksen	El Dirte	2–7	51–16	UFC 49; UFC 52; UFC 54; UFC 58; UFC 78; UFC 83; UFC 113; UFC 119; UFC 124	*SuperBrawl 30 Middleweight Tournament Winner; *WEC Middleweight title Challenger; *UFC Veteran with 9 fights in the promotion *Fought 4 times in 1 night winning 3 out of 4; *Has more MMA fights then any other Canadian fighter to make it into UFC (67)	Chris Leben; Lee Murray; Tom Lawlor; Denis Kang; Patrick Cote; John Alessio; Kalib Starnes; Takenori Sato; Anthony Macias	
CAN	Bill Mahood	The Butcher	0–1	20–7–1	UFC 53	*Just one appearance in the promotion, lost to tough competition in future UFC LHW Champ, Forrest Griffin; *Also competed for Strike Force and King of the Cage	Jason MacDonald; Shannon Ritch; Marcus Hicks	
CAN	Rob MacDonald	Bobby Maximus World's Most Powerful Nerd	1–2	5–4	UFC 58; UFC Fight Night 5 UFC 62	*Submission of the Night(1); *Former ROF Light Heavyweight Champion; *Contestant on 2 seasons of The Ultimate Fighter(TUF 2/ TUF 30); *Possesses a 100% finish rate	Eliot Marshall	
CAN	Kalib Starnes		2–3	17–11–1	TUF 3 Finale; UFC 64; UFC 71; UFC 77; UFC 83	*TUF 3 Semi-Finalist; *Fight of the Night(1); *Former XFFC Heavyweight Champion	Chris Leben; Jason Macdonald; Tim Hague	
USA	Jesse Forbes	Kid Hercules	0–3 (representing Canada once)	15–5 (representing Canada once)	TUF 3 Finale(CAN); UFC FN 20; UFC 114	*For an unknown reason Jesse Forbes represented Canada on The TUF 3 Finale, this could have been an oversight by the UFC, or just a single representation in the promotion(Similar to Brock Lesnar); *TUF 3 Semi-finalist	Anthony Smith; Jesse Taylor	
CAN	Victor Valimaki	The Finnisher	0–2	18–11	UFC FN 7 UFC 70	*Possessed a 7 fight win-streak	Jason Day; Dan Severn; Vernon White	
POL	Krzysztof Soszynski	The Polish Experiment	6–3	26–12–1	TUF 8 Finale; UFC 97; UFC 98; UFC 102; UFC 110; UFC 116; UFC 122; UFC 131; UFC 140	*Fight of the Night(1); *Submission of the Night(2); *TUF 8 Semi-finalist; *UFC Veteran with 9 fights in the promotion *Former TKO World Heavyweight Champion; *IFL (HW) World Championship Semi-finalist * Possessed a 6 fight win-streak(2)	Brian Stann; Stephan Bonnar; Jason Day; Tom Howard; Shane Primm	
CAN	Nick Penner	The Quiet Assassin	0–2	11–3	UFC on FX 2 UFC on FX 6	*Fight of the Night(1); *Possessed an 8 fight win-streak *has 82% finish rate *Was involved in the last Openweight bout in Canada, when he faced 407 lbs Butterbean at TFC in 2007	Eric Esch (Aka. Butterbean)	
CAN	Steve Bossé	The Boss	2–1	12–2 (1 NC)	UFC FN 70; UFC FN 85; UFC FN 89	*Fight of the Night(1) *has an 83% finish rate(9 Knockouts, 1 Submission); *Possessed an 8 fight win-streak	Marvin Eastman; Houston Alexander; Sean O'Connell; James Te-Huna	
CAN	Ryan Jimmo	The Big Deal	3–4	19–5	UFC 149; UFC on Fuel TV 7 UFC 161; UFC FN 30; TUF Nations Finale; UFC 174; UFC FN 67	*Former MFC Light Heavyweight Champion; *Knockout of the Night(1); *Performance of the Night (1); *Tied for 3rd fastest knockout in ufc history 0:07 R1; *Possessed a 17 fight win-streak *Jimmo was killed in a "hit and run" incident on June 26, 2016, in Edmonton, Alberta, Canada	Sean O'Connell; Anthony Perosh; Sokoudjou; Zak Cummings; Marvin Eastman; Emanuel Newton; Igor Pokrajac	
CAN	Roger Hollett	The Hulk	0–2	13–5	UFC 152; UFC on FX 8	*Former MFC Light Heavyweight Champion; *Possessed a 7 fight win-streak *Has an 85% finish rate	Victor Valimaki	
CAN	Misha Cirkunov		6–7	15–9	UFC FN 74; UFC FN 82; UFC FN 89; UFC 206; UFC FN 109; UFC on Fox 26; UFC FN 138; UFC 235; UFC FN 158; UFC FN 187; UFC FN 193; UFC FN 202; UFC FN 212	*Performance of the Night(1); *Tied (with Jon Jones) for 2nd most submission wins in UFC LHW division history(5); *Formerly ranked #7 in the UFC Light Heavyweight division in 2018; *UFC Veteran with 13 fights in the promotion *Former HKFC Light Heavyweight Champion	Nikita Krylov; Patrick Cummins; Jimmy Crute; Ion Cuțelaba; Rodney Wallace	

== Middleweights (185 lb, 84 kg) ==
ISO	Name	Nickname	UFC record	MMA record	Events	Notes	Notable Wins	Ref.
CAN	Lance Gibson	Fearless	1–1	4–5	UFC 24; UFC 29	*Canadian MMA pioneer	Akihiro Gono; Masanori Suda	
CAN	Ivan Salaverry		3–4	14–9	UFC 37; UFC 39; UFC 50; UFC 52; UFC Ultimate Fight Night; UFC 71; UFC 84	*UFC Veteran with 7 fights in the promotion *Pioneer of the crucifix-style position from side control, which is often referred to as "The Salaverry"	Andrei Semenov; Joe Riggs; Tony Fryklund	
CAN	David Loiseau	The Crow	4–5	23–11	UFC 42; UFC 44; UFC 51; UFC 53; UFC Ultimate Fight Night 2 UFC 58; UFC 63; UFC 97; UFC 115	*UFC Middleweight title Challenger, but lost to Rich Franklin at UFC 58; *UFC Veteran with 9 fights in the promotion *Former TKO World Middleweight Champion(1 defense); *Former Two-time TKO Canadian Middleweight Champion; *Former TPF Middleweight Champion	Evan Tanner; Joe Doerksen; Mark Weir; Steve Vigneault; Shawn Tompkins; Tony Fryklund	
CAN	Patrick Côté	The Predator	10–11	23–11	UFC 50; UFC 52; TUF 4 Finale; UFC 67; UFC 74; UFC FN 12; UFC 86; UFC 90; UFC 113; UFC 121; UFC 148; UFC 154; UFC 158; TUF Nations Finale; UFC 178; UFC 186; UFC FN 74; UFC FN 81; UFC FN 89; UFC 210	*UFC Middleweight title Challenger, but lost to Anderson Silva at UFC 90; *TUF 4 Finalist(lost to Travis Lutter); *Knockout of the Night(2); *Fight of the Night(1); *UFC Veteran with 21 fights in the promotion *Former MFC Middleweight Champion; *Former TKO World Middleweight Champion; *Former TKO Canadian Light Heavyweight Champion(2 defenses)	Jason Macdonald; Steve Vigneault; Jason Day; Kendall Grove; Scott Smith; Ricardo Almeida; Alessio Sakara; Kyle Noke; Joe Riggs; Josh Burkman; Ben Saunders; Bobby Voelker; Gustavo Machado; Kalib Starnes	
CAN	Jason Thacker	Strange Brew	0–1	0–1	The Ultimate Fighter 1 Finale	*First Canadian to appear on The Ultimate Fighter; *Had just 1 appearance in the promotion against tough competition(Chris Leben)	N/A	
CAN	Steve Vigneault	Lion Heart	0–1	12–6	UFC 58	*Former TKO Canadian Light Heavyweight Champion; *Former TKO Canadian Middleweight Champion(3 defenses); *Only made one UFC appearance in a losing effort at UFC 58	Sean Pierson; Shawn Tompkins	
CAN	Jason MacDonald	The Athlete	7–8	25–16	Ortiz vs. Shamrock 3: The Final Chapter; UFC 66; UFC 68; UFC 72; UFC 77; UFC 83; UFC 87; UFC 88; TUF 8 Finale; UFC 97; UFC 113; UFC 129; UFC FN 25; UFC on Fuel TV 3	*Knockout of the Night(1); *Submission of the Night(3); *UFC Veteran with 15 fights in the promotion *Former AFC Light Heavyweight Champion; *Has 2nd most submission wins out of Canadian fighters who have fought in the UFC(19); *Has an 88% finish rate *Has fought more Ultimate Fighters than anyone else in the UFC(11), despite never being on The Ultimate Fighter	Ed Herman; Chris Leben; Vernon White; Joe Doerksen(2); Shannon Ritch; Ryan Jensen; Matt Horwich	
CAN	Jason Day	Dooms	1–2	19–12	UFC 83; UFC 85; UFC 96	*Had just 3 appearances in the promotion against tough competition, defeating Alan Belcher via TKO but losing to Michael Bisping and Kendall Grove	Alan Belcher; David Loiseau; Jonathan Goulet; Krzysztof Soszynski	
CAN	Denis Kang	The Super Korean	1–2	35–16–2 (2 NC)	UFC 93; UFC 97; UFC 105	*Had just 3 appearances in the promotion against tough competition *Fight of the Night(1); *2006 PRIDE Welterweight Grand Prix Runner-Up; *One of Six Canadians to fight in Pride FC; *Former Spirit MC Middleweight Champion; *Former Spirit MC Heavyweight Champion(Two-time); *Spirit MC Grand Prix 2004 Championship; *SuperBrawl 30 Middleweight tournament Semi-finalist	Pat Healy; Marvin Eastman; Akihiro Gono; Murilo Rua; Amar Suloev; Mark Weir; Andrei Semenov; Minoru Suzuki	
CAN	Jesse Bongfeldt	Water	0–1–1	23–7–1	UFC 124; UFC 131	*Had just 2 appearances in the promotion against tough competition *Possesses a 100% finish rate(10 knockouts, 13 Submissions); *Has never seen a judges decision in his career(win or loss); *Possessed a 6 fight win-streak	Chris Clements; Kajan Johnson; T. J. Grant; Sean Pierson	
CAN	Nick Ring	The Promise	3–3	14–4	UFC 127; UFC 131; UFC 135; UFC 149; UFC 158; UFC FN 33	*TUF 11 Quarter Finalist(had to pull out due to injury); *First pick of the season for Team Ortiz; *Has never been finished in his career *Possessed a 12 win-streak	Court McGee(2) once on TUF 11	
CAN	Elias Theodorou	The Spartan	8–3	19–3	TUF Nations Finale; UFC FN 54; UFC 185; UFC FN 80; UFC FN 89; UFC FN 105; TUF 25 Finale; UFC FN 121; UFC FN 130; UFC 231; UFC FN 151	*The Ultimate Fighter Nations Middleweight Tournament winner *Formerly ranked #14 in UFC Middleweight division *Has never been finished in his career *Tied for first Canadian fighter to win TUF tournament *UFC Veteran with 11 fights in the promotion *Once held an 11 fight win-streak *First athlete to receive a Therapeutic Use Exemption for cannabis *Died due to cancer at just age 34	Eryk Anders; Sam Alvey; Cezar Ferreira; Dan Kelly; Sheldon Westcott; Trevor Smith; Bruno Santos; Roger Narvaez; Matt Dwyer	
CAN	Sheldon Westcott		1–2	9–3–1	TUF Nations Finale; UFC FN 64; UFC 195	*TUF Nations: Canada vs. Australia Middleweight Tournament finalist *TUF Nations: Canada vs. Australia Performance of the Season	Edgar García; Thomas Denny; Vik Grujic(TUF); Dan Kelly(TUF)	
CAN	Nordine Taleb		7–5	15–7	TUF Nations Finale; UFC FN 54; UFC 186; UFC 190; UFC 196; UFC FN 105; UFC FN 109; UFC on Fox 26; UFC FN 130; UFC FN 138; UFC FN 151; UFC 242	*Performance of the Night(1); *UFC Veteran with 12 fights in the promotion *Possessed a 7 fight win-streak *All of his finishes have come via KO/TKO	Erick Silva; Chris Clements; Li Jingliang; Pete Sell; Danny Roberts; Vik Grujic	
CAN	Matt Dwyer		1–3	11–9	UFC FN 54; UFC FN 61; UFC FN 71; UFC on Fox 18	*Fight of the Night(1); *Performance of the Night(1); *Former BFL Middleweight Champion; *Former XFFC Middleweight Champion	Shonie Carter; Jesse Ronson; Dominique Steele; William Macário	
CAN	Ryan Janes		2–2	10–3	UFC FN 102; UFC FN 105; UFC FN 113; TUF 26 Finale	*Former Battlefield Fight League Middleweight Champion(1 defense)	Andrew Sanchez	
CAN	Adam Hunter	Warhammer	0–0	7–2	UFC on Fox 21	*Signed a 4 fight, 20-month contract with the UFC. Originally set to face fellow Canadian Ryan Janes but he was pulled from the card a day before the event due to a possible USADA violation for multiple substances *He received a 24-month ban from competition circumventing his contract, this led to his release from the promotion in 2016	Teddy Ash	
CAN	Marc-André Barriault	Power Bar	5–6 (1 NC)	16–7 (1 NC)	UFC FN 151; UFC 240; UFC FN 165; UFC Vegas 3 UFC 260; UFC FN 191; UFC FN 200; UFC FN 205; UFC FN 210; UFC 285; UFC 289; UFC 297	*Fight of the Night (1); *UFC Veteran with 12 fights in the promotion *Former TKO Double Champion (TKO Middleweight Champion/TKO Light Heavyweight Champion); *Possessed an 8 fight win-streak (with 5 of 8 ended in stoppage via KO/TKO)	Oskar Piechota; Abu Azaitar; Dalcha Lungiambula; Jordan Wright; Julian Marquez; Eryk Anders; Chris Curtis	
CAN	KB Bhullar	The Bengal	0–2	11–5 (1 NC)	UFC FN 179; UFC on ESPN 23	*Former Unified MMA Middleweight Champion; *Possessed an 8 fight win-streak	Matt Dwyer	

== Welterweights (170 lb, 77 kg) ==
- **Bold** indicated fighter is still active on the UFC roster.

ISO	Name	Nickname	UFC record	MMA record	Events	Notes	Notable Wins	Ref.
CAN	Carlos Newton	The Ronin	3–4	16–14	UFC 17; UFC 31; UFC 34; UFC 38; UFC 40; UFC 46	*Became first Canadian UFC Champion at UFC 31 (Welterweight) defeating Pat Miletich; *Finalist of UFC 17 Tournament (lost to Dan Henderson); *Three-time UFC Welterweight title challenger *Canadian MMA pioneer *Submission over Pat Miletich was voted as one of the "Top 20 of the greatest submissions in UFC history" *Newton was considered the unofficial PRIDE FC Middleweight Champion by then president Naoto Morishita; *One of Six Canadians to fight in Pride FC	Renzo Gracie; Pat Miletich; Shonie Carter; Pete Spratt; Haim Gozali; Erik Paulson; Bob Gilstrap; Kenji Kawaguchi; Johil de Oliveira	
CAN	John Alessio	The Natural	5–7 (WEC included)	35–17 (2 NC)	UFC 26; UFC 60; Ortiz vs. Shamrock 3: The Final Chapter; UFC 145; UFC 148	*First Canadian to fight for a UFC Championship(Welterweight) at UFC 26; *Youngest fighter to compete for a UFC Championship (20 years 11 months 4 days); *SuperBrawl 16 Middleweight Tournament Winner; *Former TKO World Welterweight Champion; *Former KOTC Welterweight champion *Former TPF Welterweight Champion; *One of Six Canadians to fight in Pride FC; *Canadian MMA pioneer	Sean Pierson; Shannon Ritch; War Machine; Chris Clements; Eric Wisely; Ryan Healy; Pete Spratt; Chris Brennan	
CAN	Georges St-Pierre	GSP; Rush	20–2	26–2	UFC 46; UFC 48; UFC 50; UFC 52; UFC 54; UFC 56; UFC 58; UFC 65; UFC 69; UFC 74; UFC 79; UFC 83; UFC 87; UFC 94; UFC 100; UFC 111; UFC 124; UFC 129; UFC 154; UFC 158; UFC 167; UFC 217	*UFC Hall of Famer; *2 Division UFC Champion(3-time UFC Welterweight Champion, including Interim title/One-time UFC Middleweight Champion); *Retired with 13 fight win-streak(over 10 years undefeated); *First UFC fighter to hold Interim Welterweight Championship; *9 consecutive title defenses(3rd most in UFC history); *Most successful title defenses in the UFC Welterweight division(9); *Most wins in UFC title fights(13) Tied with Jon Jones; *Most wins by decision in UFC history(12); *Most consecutive title defenses in the UFC Welterweight division(9); *Fourth Multi-Divisional Champion in UFC history *Most takedowns in UFC history(90); *Fight of the Night (4); *Knockout of the Night(1); *Submission of the Night(1); *Performance of the Night(1); *First Canadian to be inducted into the UFC Hall of Fame; *Canadian with most fights in the UFC(22); *Former TKO/UCC Canadian Welterweight Champion(1 defense)	Matt Hughes(2); Matt Serra; Michael Bisping; B.J. Penn(2); Josh Koscheck(2); Sean Sherk; Frank Trigg; Jon Fitch; Dan Hardy; Thiago Alves; Jake Shields; Carlos Condit; Nick Diaz; Johny Hendricks; Jason Miller; Jay Hieron; Karo Parisyan; Ivan Menjivar; Pete Spratt	
CAN	Jonathan Goulet	The Road Warrior	4–5	23–12 (1 NC)	UFC FN 2 UFC FN 3 UFC FN 5 UFC FN 6 UFC FN 11; TUF 6 Finale; UFC 83; UFC FN 16; UFC 113	*Fight of the Night(2); *UFC Veteran with 9 fights in the promotion *KOTC Welterweight Championship(1)	John Alessio; Shonie Carter; Jay Hieron	
CAN	Jeff Joslin	Survivor	0–1	5–3	UFC FN 7	*Had just one fight in promotion against Josh Koscheck, was scheduled for more but retired due to injury *Has a 100% finish rate (5 KO/TKO); *Has never been finished in his career	N/A	
CAN	Rory MacDonald	The Red King	9–4	23–10–1	UFC FN 20; UFC 115; UFC 129; UFC 133; UFC 145; UFC on Fox 5 UFC on Fox 8 UFC 167; UFC 170; UFC 174; UFC FN 54; UFC 189; UFC FN 89	*UFC Welterweight title Challenger, faced and lost to Robbie Lawler for the Championship at UFC 189; *Fight of the Night(3); *Performance of the Night(1); *Former UFC top Contender in Welterweight division(ranked #1); *UFC Veteran with 13 fights in the promotion *2015 Fight of the Year vs Robbie Lawler; *PFL 2021(Playoff's) Welterweight Semi-finalist; *PFL 2022(Playoff's) Welterweight Semi-finalist; *Former Bellator Welterweight World Champion(2 Defenses); *Bellator Welterweight World Grand Prix Finalist; *Bellator Middleweight Title challenger *Former KOTC Canadian Lightweight Championship; *Former KOTC Lightweight Championship	Tyron Woodley; Paul Daley; Tarec Saffiedine; Nate Diaz; B.J. Penn; Douglas Lima; Demian Maia; Mike Pyle; Jake Ellenberger; Jordan Mein; Neiman Gracie; Kajan Johnson; Curtis Millender	
CAN	Claude Patrick	The Prince	3–1	14–2	UFC 115; UFC 120; UFC 129; UFC 140	*Has never been finished in his career *TFC Canadian Welterweight Championship	James Wilks; Daniel Roberts (fighter)	
CAN	Mark Holst	Boots	0–2	12–6	TUF 11 Finale; UFC 120	*Xtreme Kombat League Lightweight Champion; *Has a 91% finish rate	Corey Hill	
CAN	Sean Pierson	The Punisher	4–2	14–6	UFC 124; UFC 129; UFC 141; UFC on FX 3 UFC 152; UFC 161	*UFC Veteran with 6 fights in the promotion *Possessed a 6 fight win-streak	Matt Riddle; Kenny Robertson	
CAN	Chris Clements	The Menace	2–2 (1 NC)	12–6 (1 NC)	UFC 145; UFC 149; UFC 165; UFC FN 55; UFC 185	*Former PFC Welterweight Champion; *Fastest recorded Knockout by a Canadian MMA fighter(0:03/R1); *11 of 12 wins coming via KO/TKO	Rich Clementi; Jonathan Goulet	
CAN	Brock Jardine	The Machine	0–2	12–6	UFC on Fox 4 UFC 157	*Possessed a 5 fight win-streak	*None notable	
CAN	Jordan Mein	Young Gun	9–6 (Strikeforce included)	32–13	UFC 158; UFC on Fox 7 UFC on Fox 11; UFC FN 49; UFC 183; UFC 206; UFC 213; UFC on Fox 26; UFC on Fox 30	*Fight of the Night(1); *Performance of the Night(1); *UFC Veteran with 9 fights in the promotion *Tied with Gary Goodridge for the most KO/TKO's out of Canadians who have fought in the UFC (16)	Erick Silva; Mike Pyle; Forrest Petz; Joe Riggs; Joshua Burkman; Evangelista Santos; Dan Miller; Alex Morono	
CAN	Jesse Ronson	The Body Snatcher	0–5 (1 NC)	23–12 (1 NC)	UFC 165; UFC FN 36; TUF 19 Finale; UFC on ESPN 14; UFC on ESPN 34; UFC FN 211	*Performance of the Night(1); *Former TKO Welterweight Champion; *Former TKO Lightweight Champion; *Former AFC Lightweight Championship; *Former AMFFN Lightweight Champion; *Lost his first 3 fights in the promotion via Split Decision to tough competition *Possessed an 8 fight win-streak	Nicolas Dalby; Jason Saggo; Shane Campbell	
CAN	Chad Laprise	The Disciple	6–4	13–4	TUF Nations Finale; UFC FN 54; UFC 186; UFC FN 74; UFC FN 85; UFC on Fox 21; UFC 213; UFC on Fox 26; UFC FN 129; UFC 231	*TUF Nations Welterweight Tournament Winner; *Fight of the Night(1); *Performance of the Night(1); *TUF Nations: Canada vs. Australia Fight of the Season; *TUF Nations: Canada vs. Australia Performance of the Season; *UFC Veteran with 10 fights in the promotion *Possessed a 10 fight win-streak *Tied for first Canadian fighter to win TUF tournament	Bryan Barberena; Olivier Aubin-Mercier; Brian Camozzi; Thibault Gouti	
CAN	Jonathan Meunier	District, The French Spider	1–1	9–2	UFC FN 89; UFC FN 101	*Possessed a 7 fight win-streak *Was released by the promotion citing medical concerns for his condition in 2018	Richard Walsh; Dave Leduc	
CAN	**Mike Malott**	Proper	3–1	10–2–1	DWCS season 5 W6; UFC 273; UFC FN 220; UFC 289; UFC 297	*Former XFFC Lightweight Champion; *Performance of the Night (2); *Possesses a 100% finish rate (4 knockouts, 6 submissions); *Has 6 finishes in under 1:45 of round 1	Mickey Gall; Solomon Renfro; Yohan Lainesse; Neil Magny	
CAN	Yohan Lainesse	White Lion	1–3	9–3	DWCS season 5 W10; UFC on ESPN 35; UFC 279; UFC FN 220; UFC 297	*Former CFFC Welterweight Champion; *Possesses an 86% finish rate(6 knockouts); *CFFC Knockout of the Year	Darian Weeks; Mike Malott	
CAN	**Cam Nelson**		1–0	8–1	UFC Fight Night: Nurmagomedov vs. Song	*Former FLA Welterweight Champion; *First ever UFC fighter born in Prince Edward Island	Ding Meng	

== Lightweights (155 lb, 70 kg) ==
- **Bold** indicated fighter is still active on the UFC roster.

ISO	Name	Nickname	UFC record	MMA record	Events	Notes	Notable Wins	Ref.
CAN	Sam Stout	Hands of Stone	9–11	20–12–1	UFC 58; TUF 3 Finale; UFC FN 10; UFC 80; UFC 83; UFC 89; UFC 97; UFC 108; UFC 113; UFC 121; UFC 131; UFC 42; UFC on FX 4 UFC 154; UFC 157; UFC 161; UFC on Fox 9 TUF Nations finale UFC 185; UFC FN 74	*Fight of the Night(6); *Knockout of the Night(1); *UFC Veteran with 20 fights in the promotion *Retired ranked third in the modern UFC in significant strikes landed with (995); *TKO Lightweight Championship(4 defenses); *Possessed a 9 fight win-streak	Spencer Fisher(2); Joe Lauzon; Yves Jabouin; Yves Edwards; Paul Taylor; Matt Wiman	
CAN	Mark Bocek		7–5	12–5	UFC 73; UFC 79; UFC 83; UFC 91; UFC 97; TUF 10 Finale; UFC 111; UFC 124; UFC 129; UFC 140; UFC 145; UFC 154; TUF Nations finale	*Submission of the Night(2); *UFC Veteran with 13 fights in the promotion *UFC President Dana White and UFC owner Lorenzo Fertitta trained in Brazilian jiu-jitsu under his tutelage.	Nik Lentz; Mike De La Torre; John Alessio; Dustin Hazelett	
CAN	T. J. Grant		8–3	21–5	UFC 97; UFC 100; UFC 107; UFC 113; UFC 119; UFC 124; UFC on Versus 6 UFC on Fuel TV 3 UFC 152; UFC on Fox 6 UFC 160	*Knockout of the Night (2); *Fight of the Night (1); *Earned a title-shot before his injury *Ranked 3rd in Lightweight division upon retirement *UFC Veteran with 11 fights in the promotion *Possessed a 6 fight win-streak	Gray Maynard; Kevin Burns; Evan Dunham; Shane Roller; Ryo Chonan; Forrest Petz; Chad Reiner	
CAN	John Makdessi	The Bull	11–9	18–9	UFC 124; UFC 129; UFC 165; UFC 169; UFC 186; UFC 187; UFC 194; UFC FN 90; UFC 206; UFC on Fox 26; UFC on Fox 30; UFC FN 148; UFC FN 170; UFC on ABC 2 UFC FN 209; UFC 293	*Fight of the Night (1); *UFC Veteran with 20 fights in the Promotion; *Possessed a 9 fight win-streak (with 7 of 9 ending in stoppages via KO/TKO)	Ross Pearson; Shane Campbell; Daron Cruickshank; Sam Stout; Abel Trujillo; Kyle Watson; Ignacio Bahamondes	
CAN	Mitch Clarke	Danger Zone	2–5	11–5	UFC 140; UFC 149; UFC 161; UFC 173; UFC FN 63; UFC FN 90; UFC 215	*Performance of the night (1); *UFC Veteran with 7 fights in the promotion *Former EFC Lightweight Champion; *Former TFC Lightweight Champion; *Possessed a 9 fight win-streak	Al Iaquinta; John Maguire	
CAN	Mike Ricci	The Accountant	1–2	11–5	TUF 16 Finale; UFC 158; UFC 165	*TUF 16 Finalist; *TUF 16 Knockout of the Season; *Has never been submitted in his career	George Sotiropoulos; Jordan Mein; Jesse Ronson; Neil Magny(TUF)	
CAN	Olivier Aubin-Mercier	The Quebec Kid; The Canadian Gangster; The Canadian Tuxedo; OAM	7–5	19–5	TUF Nations finale# TUF Nations Finale; UFC FN 54; UFC 186; UFC FN 74; UFC on Fox 18; UFC FN 89; UFC 206; UFC FN 116; UFC 223; UFC on Fox 30; UFC 231; UFC 240	*PFL 2023 (Playoff's) Lightweight Quarter-finalist; *PFL 2022 (Playoff's) Lightweight Tournament Champion; *TUF Nations Finalist (lost in the finale to Chad Laprise); *Performance of the Night (2); *UFC Veteran with 12 fights in the promotion *Has never been finished in his career	Drew Dober; Anthony Rocco Martin; Evan Dunham; Thibault Gouti; David Michaud; Tony Sims; Marcin Held; Darrell Horcher; Shane Burgos; Raush Manfio; Stevie Ray; Natan Schulte	
CAN	Kajan Johnson	Ragin	4–3	23–13–1	TUF Nations finale# TUF Nations Finale; UFC FN 66; UFC FN 75; UFC 215; UFC FN 127; UFC on Fox 30; UFC FN 136	*TUF Nations Semi-Finalist; *Fight of the Night (1); *Former XMMA Lightweight Champion(1 defense); *UFC Veteran with 7 fights in the promotion	Stevie Ray; Ryan Healy; Zhang Lipeng; Naoyuki Kotani; Adriano Martins	
CAN	Jason Saggo		3–3	13–4	UFC 174; UFC FN 54; UFC 196; UFC FN 89; UFC 206; UFC FN 116	*BTC Lightweight Champion; *Has never been submitted in his career	Justin Salas; Leandro Silva	
CAN	Shane Campbell	Shaolin	1–4	23–8	UFC 186; UFC FN 74; UFC FN 83; UFC FN 88; UFC on Fox 21	*Current Unified MMA Catchweight(165) Champion(2 defense); *Current Unified MMA Lightweight Champion(3 defenses); *Former Unified MMA Welterweight Champion; *Former ZP Lightweight Champion; *Former AFC Lightweight Champion	Tristan Connelly; Elias Silvério; Kyle Prepolec	
CAN	Alex Ricci		0–2	10–5	UFC on Fox 21; UFC FN 105	*Had just two appearances in the promotion against tough competition losing to fellow Canadian Jeremy Kennedy and Paul Felder; *Possessed a 5 fight Knockout streak	Kyle Prepolec	
CAN	Kyle Prepolec	Kill Shot	0–2	17–8	UFC FN 151; UFC FN 158	*Current SMMA Lightweight Champion; *Former BTC Catchweight Champion(165 lbs); *Former TXC Lightweight Champion; *Has a 75% finish rate *Has never been knocked out in his career	Cody Pfister	
CAN	Tristan Connelly	Boondock	1–2	14–9	UFC FN 158; UFC 261; UFC on ESPN 35	*Performance of the Night(1); *Former RFC Lightweight Champion; *Former CS Lightweight Champion(1 defense); *Former Unified MMA Lightweight Champion; *Has a 93% finish rate	Michel Pereira	

== Featherweights (145 lb, 65 kg) ==
- **Bold** indicated fighter is still active on the UFC roster.

ISO	Name	Nickname	UFC record	MMA record	Events	Notes	Notable Wins	Ref.
CAN	Mark Hominick	The Machine	6–6 (WEC included)	20–12	UFC 58; UFC FN 5 UFC FN 23; UFC 129; UFC 140; UFC 145; UFC 154	*Fought for the inaugural UFC Featherweight Championship (lost to José Aldo); *Fight of The Night (3); *Former TKO Major League Featherweight Champion(3 defenses); *Former UCC Canadian Super-Lightweight Champion(4 defenses); *Possessed an 80% finish rate	Yves Edwards; George Roop; Bryan Caraway; Yves Jabouin; Jorge Gurgel; Danny Martinez; Leonard Garcia	
CAN	Ivan Menjivar	The Pride of El Salvador	4–4	25–12	UFC 129; UFC 133; UFC on Fuel TV 1 UFC 148; UFC 154; UFC 157; UFC 165; TUF China Finale	*Submission of the Night(2); *UFC Veteran with 8 fights in the promotion *Possessed a 6 fight win-streak	Joe Lauzon	
CAN	Antonio Carvalho	Pato	2–2	15–6	UFC 142; UFC 149; UFC 154; UFC 158	*Shooto Lightweight title Challenger; *Possessed an 8 fight win-streak	Takeshi Inoue; Hatsu Hioki	
CAN	Jeremy Kennedy	JBC; The Bandit	3–1	19–3 (1 NC)	UFC on Fox 21; UFC FN 106; UFC on Fox 25; UFC 221	*Currently ranked #5 in Bellator's Featherweight division *Former BFL Featherweight Champion; *PFL 2019(Playoff's) Featherweight Quarter-finalist; *Possessed an 11 fight win-streak	Kyle Bochniak; Steven Siler; Aaron Pico	
CAN	**Gavin Tucker**	Guv'Nor	4–2	13–2	UFC FN 105; UFC 215; UFC 240; UFC FN 174; UFC 256; UFC FN 187	*Performance of the Night(1); *Former ECC Featherweight Champion; *Possessed a 10 fight win-streak	Sam Sicilia; Seung Woo Choi; Billy Quarantillo	
CAN	**Hakeem Dawodu**	Mean	6–3	13–3–1	UFC FN 127; UFC on Fox 30; UFC 231; UFC 240; UFC 253; UFC 263; UFC FN 200; UFC 279	*Formerly ranked 15th in the UFC Featherweight division *Performance of the Night(1); *UFC Veteran with 9 fights in the promotion *Possessed a 7 fight win-streak	Steven Siler; Kyle Bochniak; Julio Arce	
CAN	**Kyle Nelson**	The Monster	2–4–1	14–5–1	UFC 231; UFC FN 151; UFC FN 159; UFC FN 177; UFC FN 208; UFC FN 218; UFC 289	*Former Elite1 MMA Featherweight Champion; *Possessed a 6 fight win-streak(2)	Jonathan Brookins; Polo Reyes; Khama Worthy; Blake Bilder	
CAN	**Charles Jourdain**	Air	6–6–1	15–7–1	UFC FN 152; UFC FN 165; UFC on ESPN 10; UFC FN 179; UFC on ESPN 16; UFC FN 187; UFC FN 191; UFC FN 199; UFC FN 205; UFC on ABC 3 UFC FN 209; UFC 288; UFC 297	*Fight of the Night(1); *UFC Veteran with 13 fights in the promotion *Former TKO Double Champion(TKO Featherweight Champion/TKO Interim Lightweight Champion); *Has 92% finish rate(8 Knockouts/4 Submissions)	Doo Ho Choi; Andre Ewell; Lando Vannata; Kron Gracie; Sean Woodson	
CAN	T.J. Laramie	The Truth	0–2	13–5	DWCS season 4 W2; UFC FN 178; UFC on ESPN 34	*First Canadian to earn UFC contract from DWCS; *Current BTC Featherweight Champion; *Former TKO Featherweight Champion; *Former PFC Featherweight Champion; *Has a 77% finish rate(7 KO/TKO, 3 SUB)	Charles Jourdain	

== Bantamweights (135 lb, 61 kg) ==
- **Bold** indicated fighter is still active on the UFC roster.

ISO	Name	Nickname	UFC record	MMA record	Events	Notes	Notable Wins	Ref.
CAN	Yves Jabouin	Tiger	5–5	20–11	UFC 129; UFC 134; UFC 140; UFC on Fuel TV 3 UFC on Fuel TV 5 UFC 161; UFC on Fox 10; UFC 174; UFC 186; UFC FN 74	*Fight of the Night (1 in WEC); *UFC Veteran with 10 fights in the promotion *Only won his fights in the promotion via decision (5 times)	Dustin Pague; Mike Easton	
CAN	Roland Delorme	Stunning	3–3 (1 NC)	10–6 (1 NC)	TUF 14 Finale; UFC on Fox 3 UFC 149; UFC 161; UFC 165; UFC 174; UFC FN 48	*TUF 14 Quarterfinalist; *Possessed a 6 fight win-streak *Won his UFC debut at TUF 14 Finale via submission	Nick Denis; Edwin Figueroa	
CAN	Nick Denis	The Ninja Of Love	1–1	11–3	UFC on FX 1 UFC on Fox 3	*Knockout of the Night(1); *Former KOTC Canada Bantamweight Champion (1 Defense); *Won 5 fights in a row via KO/TKO; *Has a 100% finish rate (10 Knockouts,1 Submission); *Has never seen the judges scorecards in his career	Nick Mamalis	
CAN	Mitch Gagnon	Relentless	4–4	12–5	UFC 149; UFC 152; UFC 167; TUF Nations Finale; UFC FN 54; UFC FN 58; UFC 206; UFC FN 151	*Fight of the Night (1); *Submission of the Night(1); *UFC Veteran with 8 fights in the promotion *Former Ringside Featherweight Champion	Dustin Kimura; Roman Salazar	
CAN	Michael Imperato		0–0	11–6	UFC FN 55	*With a record of 7–1 at the time, Imperato was invited to sign with the UFC to replace Frankie Saenz in a bout against Aljamain Sterling at UFC Fight Night 55. He was released soon after due to conduct issues from his past	N/A	
CAN	**Aiemann Zahabi**		4–2	10–2	UFC FN 105; UFC 217; UFC FN 151; UFC FN 185; UFC on ESPN 39; UFC 289	*Performance of the Night (1); *Possessed a 7 fight win-streak *Brother of famed MMA coach Firas Zahabi	Ricky Turcios; Drako Rodriguez; Aori Qileng	
CAN	**Brad Katona**	Superman	3–3	13–3	TUF 27 Finale; UFC 231; UFC FN 151; UFC FN 158; UFC 292; UFC 297	*TUF 27 Featherweight Tournament Winner; *TUF 31 Bantamweight Tournament Winner; *Current BRAVE CF Bantamweight Champion(one defense); *Possessed an 8 fight win-streak	Matthew Lopez; Cody Gibson	
CAN	Cole Smith	The Cole Train	1–2	7–3	UFC FN 151; UFC FN 158; UFC FN 176	*Former three-time BFL Bantamweight Champion (2 Defenses); *Has never been finished in his pro MMA career *Possessed a 7 fight win-streak	Mitch Gagnon	
CAN	**Chad Anheliger**	The Monster	1–1	12–6	DWCS season 5 W2; UFC FN 201; UFC 279	*Second Canadian to earn a UFC contract from DWCS; *Former RFC Double Champion; *Former RFC Bantamweight Champion (1 Defense); *Former RFC Flyweight Champion; *Has never been knocked out in his MMA career *Possessed a 9 fight win-streak (finishing 7 of 9)	Brady Hiestand	
CAN	**Serhiy Sidey**		0–1	10–2	DWCS season 6 W5; UFC 297	*Former BTC Bantamweight Champion; *Former BFL Bantamweight Champion; *Possessed a 6 fight win-streak	Ramon Taveras (2)	

== Flyweights (125 lb, 56 kg) ==
- **Bold** indicated fighter is still active on the UFC roster.

ISO	Name	Nickname	UFC record	MMA record	Events	Notes	Notable Wins	Ref.
CAN	Chris Kelades	The Greek Assassin	2–2	14–5	UFC FN 152; UFC FN 60; UFC FN 74; UFC 197	*Fight of the Night(1); *Won interim M-1 Challenge Flyweight Championship; *Possessed a 6 fight win-streak	Paddy Holohan	
CAN	Malcolm Gordon	X	2–4	14–7	UFC FN 172; UFC on ESPN 18; UFC on ESPN 26; UFC FN 200; UFC 280; UFC 286; UFC 297	*UFC Veteran with 6 fights in the promotion *Former TKO Flyweight Championships(two defences); *Former WXC Flyweight Championships(one defence); *Former PMMA Bantamweight Championships; *Former HFC Flyweight Champions(one defence); *Has an 83% finish rate(4 knockouts,6 submissions)	Chris Kelades; Francisco Figueiredo	

== Woman's Featherweight (145 lb, 65 kg) ==
ISO	Name	Nickname	UFC record	MMA record	Events	Notes	Notable Wins	Ref.
CAN	Felicia Spencer	Feenom	3–3	9–3	UFC FN 152; UFC 240; UFC FN 169; UFC 250; UFC FN 188; UFC FN 197	*UFC Women's Featherweight title challenger, lost to Amanda Nunes at UFC 250; *T-Most finishes in UFC Women's Featherweight division history (3); *T-Most fights in UFC Women's Featherweight division history (6); *T-Most knockouts in UFC Women's Featherweight division history (2); *T-Most submission wins in UFC Women's Featherweight division history *Most total fight time in UFC Women's Featherweight division history (1:16:26); *Former Invicta FC Featherweight Champion; *One of 5 fighters to take Cris Cyborg to decision *Possessed a 7 fight win-streak	Pam Sorenson; Megan Anderson	

== Woman's Bantamweight (135 lb, 61 kg) ==
- **Bold** indicated fighter is still active on the UFC roster.

ISO	Name	Nickname	UFC record	MMA record	Events	Notes	Notable Wins	Ref.
CAN	Alexis Davis	Ally-gator	10–7	21–11	UFC 161; UFC FN 31; UFC 170; UFC 175; UFC 186; TUF 24 Finale; UFC FN 105; UFC FN 123; UFC on Fox 30; UFC FN 148; UFC 240; UFC FN 186; UFC 263; UFC FN 200	*First Canadian female to fight and win in the UFC; *UFC WBW Title Challenger (lost to Ronda Rousey) *#5-ranked 135-pound female fighter according to the Unified Women's MMA Rankings; *Has a victory over current female G.O.A.T Amanda Nunes via TKO; *Formerly ranked 2nd in the UFC Woman's Bantamweight and 10th in UFC Woman's Flyweight division	Amanda Nunes; Liz Carmouche(2); Jessica Eye; Sarah Kaufman; Valerie Letourneau; Tonya Evinger(2); Cindy Dandois; Rosi Sexton	
CAN	Sarah Kaufman		7–4 (1 NC) (Strikeforce included)	22–5 (1 NC)	UFC 166; TUF Nations Finale; UFC 186; UFC on Fox 17	*She was formerly ranked 2nd in the UFC Woman's Bantamweight division *Inaugural Strikeforce Women's Bantamweight Champion; *Invicta FC Bantamweight Champion (Current) * PFL 2019(Playoff's) Women's Lightweight Semi-finalist	Alexis Davis(2); Valérie Létourneau; Miesha Tate; Takayo Hashi; Roxanne Modafferi; Leslie Smith(2); Liz Carmouche; Jessica-Rose Clark	
CAN	Sarah Moras	Cheesecake	3–6	6–7	TUF 19 Finale; UFC FN 71; UFC 215; UFC FN 126; UFC FN 138; UFC FN 151; UFC 242; UFC on ABC 1	*Formally ranked 14th in the Woman's Bantamweight division *UFC Veteran with 9 fights in the promotion *TUF 18 Tournament Semi-finalist	Ashlee Evans-Smith; Julianna Peña; Tara LaRosa(TUF); Peggy Morgan(TUF)	

== Woman's Flyweight (125 lb, 56 kg) ==
- **Bold** indicated fighter is still active on the UFC roster.

ISO	Name	Nickname	UFC record	MMA record	Events	Notes	Notable Wins	Ref.
CAN	Valérie Létourneau	Trouble	3–3	10–7	UFC 174; UFC 186; UFC FN 74; UFC 193; UFC FN 89; UFC 206	*UFC Woman's Straw-weight Title Challenger (lost to Joanna Jędrzejczyk); *Formerly ranked 5th in the UFC woman's Straw-weight division *Participated in the UFC's First Straw-weight bout *Fought for the Bellator Women's Flyweight World Championship	Maryna Moroz; Jessica Rakoczy	
CAN	Jessica Rakoczy	Ragin	0–2	1–5 (1 NC)	TUF 18 Finale; UFC 186	*TUF 18 Tournament Runner-up; *TUF 18 Knockout of the Season; *Well decorated professional boxer (33-3-1) transitioned into MMA	Raquel Pennington(TUF); Roxanne Modafferi(TUF)	
CAN	**Jasmine Jasudavicius**		4–2	10–3	DWCS season 5 W3; UFC 270; UFC on ESPN 37; UFC FN 220; UFC 289; UFC 297	*Ranked #15 in UFC Woman's Flyweight division *First Canadian female to earn a UFC contract from DWCS; *Former BCM Flyweight Champion	Kay Hansen; Miranda Maverick; Priscila Cachoeira	
CAN	**Jamey-Lyn Horth**		1–1	6–1	UFC on ESPN 45	*Former LFA Flyweight Champion; *Former BFL Amateur Flyweight Champion; *Possessed a 6 fight win streak *Possesses a 83% finish rate (3 knockouts, 1 Submission)	Lupita Godinez (2)	

== Woman's Strawweight (115 lb, 52 kg) ==
ISO	Name	Nickname	UFC record	MMA record	Events	Notes	Notable Wins	Ref.
CAN	Randa Markos	Quiet Storm	7–10–1	11–11–1	TUF 20 Finale; UFC 186; UFC on Fox 7 UFC FN 89; UFC 202; UFC FN 105; UFC FN 114; UFC on Fox 27; UFC on Fox 30; UFC FN 137; UFC FN 148; UFC 239; UFC on ESPN+ 20; UFC FN 170; UFC FN 178; UFC FN 183; UFC on ESPN 23; UFC FN 196	*Formerly ranked 6th in the UFC woman's Straw-weight division *TUF 20 Semi-finalist; *Performance of the Night(1); *Fight of the Night(1); *Most fights in the UFC Strawweight division(18); *Former PFC Strawweight Champion; *UFC Veteran with 18 fights in the promotion *Has never been knocked out in her career	Carla Esparza; Angela Hill; Ashley Yoder; Aisling Daly; Juliana Lima; Felice Herrig(TUF); Tecia Torres(TUF)	
CAN	**Gillian Robertson**	The Savage	10–6	13–8	TUF 26 Finale; UFC FN 130; UFC FN 137; UFC FN 145; UFC 240; UFC on ESPN 6 UFC FN 180; UFC 260; UFC 269; UFC FN 203; UFC FN 210; UFC on ESPN 44; UFC on ABC 5 UFC 297	*Ranked #15 in UFC Woman's Strawweight division *Most fights in UFC Women's Flyweight division (14); *Most submission in UFC Women's Flyweight division (7); *Most stoppage wins in UFC Women's Flyweight division (8); *Formerly ranked 15th in the UFC Women's Flyweight division *UFC Veteran with 16 fights in the promotion	Molly McCann; Hannah Cifers; Veronica Macedo; Cortney Casey; Priscila Cachoeira; Mariya Agapova; Polyana Viana	

== UFC Hall of Fame ==
=== Modern-era wing ===
Name	Date of Induction (event)	UFC recognized accolades
(Canada) Georges St-Pierre	July 9, 2020 (UFC Hall of Fame Ceremony, 2020)	*2 Division UFC Champion(3 time UFC Welterweight Champion, including Interim title/One time UFC Middleweight Champion); *Retired with 13 fight win-streak(over 10 years undefeated); *First UFC fighter to hold Interim Welterweight Championship; *9 consecutive title defenses (3rd most in UFC history); *2nd most wins in UFC title fights (13); *Most wins by decision in UFC history (12); *Most successful title defenses in the UFC welterweight division(9); *Fourth Multi-Divisional Champion in UFC History; *Most takedowns in UFC history (90); *First Hall of Fame inductee from Canada

=== Fight wing ===
Name	Fight	Date of Induction	Ref.	Event of Induction	Notes
(Canada) Rory MacDonald	Robbie Lawler vs. Rory MacDonald II	July 6, 2023		UFC Hall of Fame Ceremony, 2023	Robbie Lawler def. Rory MacDonald by TKO in the fifth round, MacDonald had been ahead 39-37 on all three judges scorecards. This fight was for the UFC Welterweight Championship at UFC 188. Fight of the Night and Fight of the Year 2015.

== Tournament participation ==
Canadian mixed martial artists have participated in the UFC's original tournament format as well as The Ultimate Fighter tournaments. Canada has produced 3 tournament Champion's and has made it to the Finals 9 times, Semi-finals 7 times and Quarter-finals 11 times. 4 fighters from Canada participated in the UFC's original tournaments(usually Openweight contests consisting of 3 fights in one night) and 25 Canadians have fought on The Ultimate Fighter(20 of the 25 received contracts to fight in the UFC). Canada has participated in 26 tournaments in total, placing or winning in 22 of them.

=== Canadian UFC Tournament combatants ===
Events	Competitor	Results	Opponents	Notes	Date
UFC 3 UFC 7	Harold Howard	*UFC 3 Tournament Finalist, winning his first fight of the night(as well as in the UFC) in just 0:46 via KO, After bouts with Royce Gracie and Ken Shamrock were cancelled due to injuries he was matched against alternate Steve Jennum, he lost the fight via submission *UFC 7 Tournament Quarter-finalist, He was eliminated in the Quarter final round to Mark Hall via submission	Roland Payne; Royce Gracie(cancelled); Ken Shamrock(cancelled); Steve Jennum; Mark Hall	*Harold Howard was the first Canadian to fight in the UFC; *First Canadian to win a fight in the promotion *First Canadian to make to the Finals of a UFC tournament	September 9, 1994(UFC 3); September 8, 1995(UFC 7)
UFC 5 UFC 6 UFC 15; Ultimate Ultimate 1995	Dave Beneteau	*UFC 5 Tournament Finalist, defeating his first 2 opponents via TKO in less than 3 minutes total, he lost in the finals against UFC hall of famer Dan Severn via submission *UFC 6 Quarter-finalist, lost to Oleg Taktarov via submission *Ultimate Ultimate 1995 Quarter-finalist, lost to Oleg Taktarov via submission *UFC 15 Heavyweight Tournament Finalist(pulled out due to fatigue) after winning a decision victory over Carlos Barreto	Asbel Cancio; Todd Medina; Dan Severn; Oleg Taktarov(2); Carlos Barreto	*2 time UFC Tournament Finalist; *Second Canadian to fight in the promotion *Only Canadian to make it to tournament Finals twice	April 7, 1995(UFC 5); July 14, 1995(UFC 6); December 16, 1995(Ultimate Ultimate 1995); October 17, 1997(UFC 15)
UFC 8 UFC 10; Ultimate Ultimate 1996	Gary Goodridge	*UFC 8 Tournament Finalist, defeating his first 2 opponents via KO/TKO(including the famous Knockout of Paul Herrera via elbows in just 13 seconds) to make his way to the finals, he lost in the finals against UFC hall of famer Don Frye via submission *UFC 10 Semi-finalist, Knocking out John Campetella in under a 1:30 of R1, he lost in the semi-finals against UFC hall of famer Mark Coleman via submission(due to exhaustion); *Ultimate Ultimate 1996 Quarter-finalist, lost to Don Frye via submission(due to exhaustion)	Paul Herrera; Jerry Bohlander; Don Frye(2); John Campetella; Mark Coleman	*Tied for the most knockouts by a Canadian MMA fighter(16); *Every Tournament victory came via KO/TKO	February 16, 1996(UFC 8); July 12, 1996(UFC 10); December 7, 1996(Ultimate Ultimate 1996)
UFC 17	Carlos Newton	*UFC 17 Tournament Finalist, defeating Bob Gilstrap via submission to make his way to the finals, he would go on to lose against Dan Henderson via split decision(A punch delivered from Newton in their fight broke Henderson's jaw)	Bob Gilstrap; Dan Henderson	*Canadian closest to winning a UFC Tournament; *Last Canadian to fight in original UFC Tournament format	May 15, 1998(UFC 17)

=== Canadian TUF Tournament combatants ===
Events	Competitor	Results	Opponents	Notes	Date
The Ultimate Fighter 1	Jason Thacker	*TUF 1 Tournament contestant, His appearance was something of a novelty on the show as he was the first Canadian to appear on The Ultimate Fighter, His fellow TUF contestants were already established in the sport, Thacker entered the show with no professional experience or training. Falling behind he would be sent home. He would be invited back to compete at The Ultimate Fighter 1 Finale he would lose the fight via TKO. Despite his short appearance in the sport he has left a lasting image to his fans both Canadian and around the world.	Chris Leben(UFC)	*First Canadian to appear on The Ultimate Fighter	January 17, 2005 – April 9, 2005
The Ultimate Fighter 2 The Ultimate Fighter 30	Rob MacDonald	*TUF 2 Tournament contestant, he faced Brad Imes in the preliminary round, he lost the fight via submission. He impressed regardless and would be invited to join the UFC in 2006; *TUF 30 Tournament Quarter-finalist, at 43 years of age, Bobby Maximus returned to competition after 13 years of retirement, he faced Eduardo Perez in the Quarter-finals, despite initial success he would lose the fight via TKO	Brad Imes (TUF 2); Eduardo Perez (TUF 30)	*First Canadian to fight on The Ultimate Fighter; *Returned to competition after a 13 year hiatus from MMA to compete on season 30 of the show, making it 6,098 days since he was first on TUF	August 22, 2005 – November 5, 2005 (TUF 2); May 3, 2022 – (TUF 30)
The Ultimate Fighter 3	Kalib Starnes	*TUF 3 Tournament Semi-finalist, defeating Mike Stine via TKO (doctor stoppage) He advanced to the Semi-finals, where he lost via verbal submission(rib injury) to Kendall Grove	Mike Stine; Kendall Grove	*First Canadian to win a fight on The Ultimate Fighter * First Canadian to make it to the TUF Semi-finals	April 6, 2006 – June 15, 2006
The Ultimate Fighter 4	Patrick Côté	*TUF 4 Tournament Finalist, defeating Jorge Rivera via decision in the Quarterfinals. In the Semifinals he would go on to face Edwin Dewees, Côté dominates the entire fight landing some hard punches and scoring points with take downs. Côté won via unanimous decision scoring 30–27 by all three judges.He advanced to the finale, where he lost by submission to Travis Lutter at The Ultimate Fighter 4 Finale	Jorge Rivera; Edwin Dewees; Travis Lutter	*First Canadian to reach The Ultimate Fighter Finale; *Later returned to TUF as a coach against fellow UFC Veteran Kyle Noke on The Ultimate Fighter Nations: Canada vs. Australia	August 17-November 11, 2006
The Ultimate Fighter 8	Krzysztof Soszynski	*TUF 8 Tournament Semi-finalist, defeating his first 2 opponents Mike Stewart and Kyle Kingsbury via submission making it to the Semi-finals, he lost in the Semi-finals against Vinny Magalhães via submission	Mike Stewart; Kyle Kingsbury; Vinny Magalhães	*Earned Submission of the Night in his UFC debut	September 17, 2008 – December 13, 2008
The Ultimate Fighter 8	Ryan Jimmo	*TUF 8 Tournament contestant, for the elimination round Jimmo would face Antwain Britt to secure a spot on the show. He would go on to lose the fight via majority decision, though he was praised for his efforts by UFC president Dana White	Antwain Britt	*Tied for 2nd fastest knockout in UFC history in his promotional debut *Earned Knockout of the Night in his UFC debut	September 17, 2008 – December 13, 2008
The Ultimate Fighter 11	Nick Ring	*TUF 11 Tournament Quarter-finalist, defeating his first opponent Woody Wetherby via TKO in his qualifier match, he went on to defeat Court McGee via majority decision making it to the Quarter-finals, He however was forced to pull out of the Tournament due to an ACL injury	Woody Wetherby; Court McGee	*Was the first pick of the season for Team Ortiz; *Was set to rematch Court McGee in the Semi-finals before he was forced to pull out *He would eventually make his UFC debut at UFC 127	March 31, 2010 – June 19, 2010
The Ultimate Fighter 14	Roland Delorme	*TUF 14 Tournament Quarter-finalist, defeating his first opponent B.J. Ferguson via submission in his qualifying bout making it to the Quarter-finals, where he lost to T.J. Dillashaw via submission	B.J. Ferguson; T.J. Dillashaw	*Delorme made his debut winning against Josh Ferguson via submission	September 21, 2011 – December 3, 2011
The Ultimate Fighter 16	Mike Ricci	*TUF 16 Tournament Finalist, defeating his first 2 opponents Dom Waters and Michael Hill via decision making it to the Semi-finals, He was matched up against Neil Magny he won the fight in the first round via KO, Ricci went on tho face Colton Smith in the finals where he lost via decision	Dom Waters; Michael Hill; Neil Magny; Colton Smith	*Earned Knockout of the Season in his fight with Neil Magny	September 14, 2012 – December 15, 2012
The Ultimate Fighter 16	Micheal Hill	*TUF 16 Tournament Quarter-finalist, defeating his first opponent Matt Secor via submission in his qualifying bout making it to the Quarter-finals, where he lost to fellow Canadian Mike Ricci via decision	Matt Secor; Mike Ricci	*Never signed with the UFC; *Won his TUF elimination bout in less than 1:30 via KO(punches)	September 14, 2012 – December 15, 2012
The Ultimate Fighter 18	Jessica Rakoczy	*TUF 18 Tournament Finalist, defeating her first opponent Revelina Berto via submission to make it onto the show, in the Quarter-finals she faced Roxanne Modafferi winning the fight via TKO, In the Semi-finals Rakoczy faced Raquel Pennington and won the fight via decision making it to the Finals, where she lost to Julianna Peña via TKO	Revelina Berto; Roxanne Modafferi; Raquel Pennington; Julianna Peña	*Earned Knockout of the Season in her fight with Roxanne Modafferi	September 4, 2013 – November 27, 2013
The Ultimate Fighter 18	Sarah Moras	*TUF 18 Tournament Semi-finalist, defeating her first opponent Tara LaRosa via decision in the elimination round, in the Quarter-finals she faced Peggy Morgan winning the fight via submission, In the Semi-finals Moras faced Julianna Peña she would lose the fight via submission	Tara LaRosa; Peggy Morgan; Julianna Peña	*Earned Submission of the Season; *Would go on to make her UFC debut at the TUF 19 Finale	September 4, 2013 – November 27, 2013
The Ultimate Fighter 18	Josh Hill	*TUF 18 Tournament Quarter-finalist, defeating his first opponent Paddy Holohan via Split decision to make it onto the show, in the Quarter-finals he faced Mike Wooten, he would lose the fight via Decision.	Paddy Holohan; Érik Pérez; Mike Wooten	*Never signed with the UFC but with Bellator MMA; *Fought on first episode of the season 18. *Ranked #8 in the Bellator Bantamweight Rankings	September 4, 2013 – November 27, 2013
The Ultimate Fighter 18	Valérie Létourneau	*TUF 18 Tournament contestant, for the elimination round Létourneau would face Roxanne Modafferi to secure a spot on the show. She would go on to lose the fight via submission	Roxanne Modafferi	Létourneau made her UFC debut at UFC 174 taking on Elizabeth Phillips she won the fight via split decision	September 4, 2013 – November 27, 2013
The Ultimate Fighter 18	Louis Fisette	*TUF 18 Tournament contestant/alternate, for the elimination round Fisette would face Chris Holdsworth to secure a spot on the show. He would go on to lose the fight via submission. He would later be brought in to replace Tim Gorman. He would face David Grant losing the fight via submission	Chris Holdsworth; Davey Grant	*Never signed with the UFC; *Only Canadian fighter to act as an alternate on TUF	September 4, 2013 – November 27, 2013
The Ultimate Fighter Nations: Canada vs. Australia	Elias Theodorou	*TUF Nations Tournament Winner(Middleweight), defeating his first 2 opponents Zein Saliba and Tyler Manawaroa via decision, He advanced to the finale, where he faced fellow Canadian Sheldon Westcott he won the fight via TKO winning the TUF nations Middleweight tournament	Zein Saliba; Tyler Manawaroa; Sheldon Westcott	*Tied for the first Canadian to win The Ultimate Fighter Tournament; *Went on to be ranked 13th in the Middleweight division	January 15, 2014 – April 9, 2014
The Ultimate Fighter Nations: Canada vs. Australia	Chad Laprise	*TUF Nations Tournament Winner(Welterweight), defeating his first opponent Chris Indich via decision, He advanced to the Semi-finals, where he faced fellow Canadian Kajan Johnson he won the fight via KO, In the Finale he faced fellow Canadian Olivier Aubin-Mercier he won the fight via decision, winning the TUF nations Welterweight tournament	Chris Indich; Kajan Johnson; Olivier Aubin-Mercier	*Tied for the first Canadian to win The Ultimate Fighter Tournament; *Earned Knockout of the Season and Performance of the Season	January 15, 2014 – April 9, 2014
The Ultimate Fighter Nations: Canada vs. Australia	Sheldon Westcott	*TUF Nations Tournament Finalist, defeating Dan Kelly via submission and Vik Grujic via submission in his first 2 fights. He advanced to the finale, where he lost by TKO to fellow Canadian Elias Theodorou	Dan Kelly; Vik Grujic; Elias Theodorou	*Earned Submission of the Season in his fight with Vik Grujic	January 15, 2014 – April 9, 2014
The Ultimate Fighter Nations: Canada vs. Australia	Olivier Aubin-Mercier	*TUF Nations Tournament Finalist, defeating Jake Matthews via decision and Richard Walsh via submission in his first 2 bouts, He advanced to the finale, where he lost by Split decision to fellow Canadian Chad Laprise	Jake Matthews; Richard Walsh; Chad Laprise	*Was undefeated in his career until losing to Chad Laprise in the finals	January 15, 2014 – April 9, 2014
The Ultimate Fighter Nations: Canada vs. Australia	Kajan Johnson	*TUF Nations Tournament Semi-finalist, defeating Brendan O’Reilly via submission he advanced to the Semi-finals, where he lost by KO to Chad Laprise	Brendan O’Reilly; Chad Laprise	*Earned Canada the first win of the season over team Australia	January 15, 2014 – April 9, 2014
The Ultimate Fighter Nations: Canada vs. Australia The Ultimate Fighter 19	Nordine Taleb	*TUF Nations Tournament Quarter-finalist, he was matched against Tyler Manawaroa he lost the fight via decision *TUF 19 Tournament contestant, He faced Mike King in the preliminary round, He lost the fight via decision	Tyler Manawaroa; Mike King	*First Canadian to participate on 2 different seasons of TUF	January 15, 2014 – April 9, 2014 (TUF Nations); April 16 – July 6, 2014 (TUF 19)
The Ultimate Fighter Nations: Canada vs. Australia	Luke Harris	*TUF Nations Tournament Quarter-finalist, he was matched against Vik Grujic he lost the fight via TKO	Vik Grujic	*Never signed with the UFC	January 15, 2014 – April 9, 2014
The Ultimate Fighter Nations: Canada vs. Australia	Matthew Desroches	*TUF Nations Tournament Quarter-finalist, he was matched against Richard Walsh he lost the fight via decision	Richard Walsh	*Never signed with the UFC; *Member of the Canadian Armed Forces	January 15, 2014 – April 9, 2014
The Ultimate Fighter 20	Randa Markos	*TUF 20 Tournament Semi-finalist, defeating Tecia Torres in her first fight via decision, She then defeated Felice Herrig in the Quarter-finals via submission, In the Semi-finals she faced future UFC champion Rose Namajunas she lost the bout via submission	Tecia Torres; Felice Herrig; Rose Namajunas	*Earned Performance of the Season in her fight with Rose Namajunas	September 10, 2014 – December 10, 2014
The Ultimate Fighter 26	Gillian Robertson	*TUF 26 Tournament contestant, she was matched against Barb Honchak in the Qualifiers she lost the fight via TKO	Barb Honchak	*Made her UFC debut against Emily Whitmire at TUF 26 Finale she won the fight via submission	August 30, 2017 – November 29, 2017
The Ultimate Fighter 27 The Ultimate Fighter 31	Brad Katona	*TUF 27 Tournament Winner(Featherweight), defeating his first opponent Kyler Phillips via decision, He advanced to the Semi-finals, where he faced teammate Bryce Mitchell he won the fight via submission, In the Finale he faced Jay Cucciniello he won the fight via decision, winning the TUF 27 Featherweight tournament	Kyler Phillips; Bryce Mitchell; Jay Cucciniello	*Became the third Canadian to win The Ultimate Fighter Tournament	April 18, 2018 – July 4, 2018 (TUF 27); May 30, 2023 – August 15, 2023 (TUF 31)

=== Canadian TUF Coaches ===
Season	Coach	Notes	Opposing Coach	Date
The Ultimate Fighter 4 The Ultimate Fighter 12	Georges St-Pierre	*TUF 4 Coach on Team Mojo, This season featured fighters that had already fought in the UFC, and a chance to earn a shot at the title. Matt Serra from Team Mojo would go on to win the Welterweight tournament, Patrick Côté from Team Mojo made it to the finals of the Middleweight tournament but lost to Travis Lutter, there was no coaches fight this season. *TUF 12 Coach on Team St-Pierre, Which ended up providing both of the Finalists for the Lightweight tournament, Jonathan Brookins would get the victory over teammate Michael Johnson via decision. *Georges St-Pierre would go on to face Josh Koscheck(for the second time) in the Coaches fight at UFC 124, he won the fight via Unanimous decision earning a Fight of the Night bonus and also defended his UFC Welterweight title	Randy Couture(TUF 4); Josh Koscheck(TUF 12)	August 17, 2006 – November 2, 2006(TUF 4); September 15, 2010 – December 4, 2010(TUF 12)
The Ultimate Fighter Nations: Canada vs. Australia	Patrick Côté	*TUF Nations Coach on Team Canada, This season featured fighters From Canada and Australia facing off at Welterweight and Middleweight, Team Canada ended up winning a dominant victory over the Australians providing all four finalists, Chad Laprise Won the Welterweight Tournament and Elias Theodorou won the Middleweight Tournament giving Canada its first tournament champions. *Patrick Côté Would go on to face Kyle Noke in the Coaches fight at TUF Nations Finale, he won the fight via Unanimous decision earning Team Canada another win.	Kyle Noke(TUF Nations)	January 15, 2014 – April 9, 2014

== List Records ==
=== Most Knockout wins by Canadian MMA fighters ===
*All fighters included in this list

	Fighter	Division/s	Knockouts
1.	(Canada) **Jordan Mein**	Welterweight; Catchweight	16
1.	(Trinidad and Tobago) **Gary Goodridge**	Heavyweight; Openweight	16
2.	(Canada) **David Loiseau**	Middleweight; Light Heavyweight	15
2.	(Canada) **Tim Hague**	Heavyweight; Catchweight	15
2.	(Canada) **Denis Kang**	Middleweight; Light Heavyweight	15
3.	(Canada) **Jonathan Goulet**	Middleweight; Welterweight	12

=== Most Submission wins by Canadian MMA fighters ===
*All fighters included in this list

	Fighter	Division/s	Submissions
1.	(Canada) **Joe Doerksen**	Middleweight; Light Heavyweight; Welterweight	35
2.	(Canada) **Jason MacDonald**	Middleweight; Light Heavyweight	19
3.	(Canada) **Denis Kang**	Middleweight; Light Heavyweight	14
3.	(Canada) **John Alessio**	Welterweight; Lightweight	14

=== Most Decision wins by Canadian MMA fighters ===
*All fighters included in this list

	Fighter	Division/s	Decision
1.	(Canada) **Georges St-Pierre**	Welterweight; Middleweight	12
2.	(Canada) **Alexis Davis**	Bantamweight; Flyweight	11
3.	(Canada) **Sam Stout**	Lightweight; Welterweight	10
3.	(Canada) **Elias Theodorou**	Middleweight; Catchweight	10

=== Most Finishes by Canadian MMA fighters ===
*All fighters included in this list

	Fighter	Division/s	Finishes
1.	(Canada) **Joe Doerksen**	Middleweight; Light Heavyweight; Welterweight	43
2.	(Canada) **Denis Kang**	Middleweight; Light Heavyweight	29
3.	(Canada) **John Alessio**	Welterweight; Lightweight	27

=== Longest Win-streak by Canadian MMA fighters ===
*All fighters included in this list

	Fighter	Division/s	Win-streak
1.	(Canada) **Denis Kang**	Middleweight; Light Heavyweight	21
2.	(Canada) **Ryan Jimmo**	Light Heavyweight	17
3.	(Canada) **Georges St-Pierre**	Welterweight; Middleweight	13

=== Most Fights by Canadian MMA fighters ===
*All fighters included in this list

	Fighter	Division/s	Fights
1.	(Canada) **Joe Doerksen**	Middleweight; Light Heavyweight; Welterweight	67
2.	(Canada) **Denis Kang**	Middleweight; Light Heavyweight	55
3.	(Canada) **John Alessio**	Welterweight; Lightweight	54

=== Fastest Knockouts by a Canadian MMA fighter ===
*All fighters included in this list

	Fighter	Opponent	Time (Round 1)	Method
1.	(Canada) **Chris Clements**	Lautaro Tucas	0:03	Punch
2.	(Canada) **Tim Hague**	**Tanner Boser**	0:06	Punches
3.	(Canada) **Ryan Jimmo**	**Anthony Perosh**	0:07	Right hook
3.	(Canada) **Jonathan Goulet**	Joey Brown	0:07	Knee

=== Fastest Submissions by a Canadian MMA fighter ===
*All fighters included in this list

	Fighter	Opponent	Time (Round 1)	Method
1.	(Canada) **Sheldon Westcott**	Aaron Shmyr	0:13	Guillotine choke
2.	(Canada) **Denis Kang**	Eric Harcrow	0:15	Rear-naked choke
3.	(Canada) **Nick Ring**	Bill Mahood	0:22	Verbal

=== Most UFC Bonuses won by Canadian MMA fighters ===
*All fighters included in this list

	Fighter	Division/s	Bonuses
1.	(Canada) **Georges St-Pierre**	Middleweight; Welterweight	7
1.	(Canada) **Sam Stout**	Lightweight; Welterweight	7
2.	(Canada) **Rory MacDonald**	Welterweight; Middleweight	4
2.	(Canada) **Jason MacDonald**	Middleweight; Heavyweight	4
3.	(Canada) **Patrick Cote**	Middleweight; Welterweight; Light Heavyweight	3
3.	(Canada) **Mark Hominick**	Featherweight; Lightweight	3
3.	(Canada) **T. J. Grant**	Lightweight	3
3.	(Poland) **Krzysztof Soszynski**	Light Heavyweight; Heavyweight	3

=== Most Title fights in the UFC by Canadian MMA fighters ===
*All fighters included in this list

	Fighter	Division/s	Title Fights
1.	(Canada) **Georges St-Pierre**	Welterweight; Middleweight	15
2.	(Canada) **Carlos Newton**	Welterweight	3
3.	(Canada) **David Loiseau**	Middleweight	1
3.	(Canada) **Patrick Côté**	Middleweight	1
3.	(Canada) **John Alessio**	Welterweight	1
3.	(Canada) **Rory MacDonald**	Welterweight	1
3.	(Canada) **Mark Hominick**	Featherweight	1
3.	(Canada) **Felicia Spencer**	Featherweight	1
3.	(Canada) **Alexis Davis**	Bantamweight	1
3.	(Canada) **Valérie Létourneau**	Flyweight	1

=== Most Fights in the UFC by Canadian MMA fighter ===
*All fighters included in this list

	Fighter	Division/s	UFC appearances
1.	(Canada) **Georges St-Pierre**	Welterweight; Middleweight	22
2.	(Canada) **Patrick Cote**	Middleweight; Welterweight; Light Heavyweight	21
3.	(Canada) **Sam Stout**	Lightweight; Welterweight	20

== See also ==
- List of current UFC fighters
- List of UFC champions
- List of UFC records
- List of Pride FC alumni
- List of current Bellator fighters
- List of current Invicta FC fighters
- List of current Rizin FF fighters
- List of current PFL fighters
- List of current ONE fighters
- List of Pancrase champions
- TKO Major League MMA
- Prospect Fighting Championships
