= Nordine Taleb =

French mixed martial arts fighter

- Born: June 10, 1981 (age 45); Saint-Tropez, France
- Nationality: France; Canada
- Height: 6 ft 1 in (1.85 m)
- Weight: 170 lb (77 kg; 12 st)
- Division: Middleweight; Welterweight
- Reach: 74 in (188 cm)
- Fighting out of: Montreal, Quebec, Canada
- Team: Tristar Gym
- Rank: Brown belt in Brazilian Jiu-Jitsu under Firas Zahabi
- Years active: 2007–2019

Mixed martial arts record
- Total: 22
- Wins: 15
- By knockout: 7
- By decision: 8
- Losses: 7
- By knockout: 3
- By submission: 2
- By decision: 2

Other information
- Mixed martial arts record from Sherdog

Nordine Taleb (Arabic: نوردين طالب, born June 10, 1981) is a French and Canadian former professional mixed martial artist. He is currently signed in the Welterweight division of the ARES FC. A professional from 2007 to 2019, he has also competed for Bellator MMA and Ultimate Fighting Championship for six years.

== Mixed martial arts career ==
=== Early career ===
Taleb began his professional career with a unanimous decision victory, before losing his next bout via TKO. After a further four victories across Canada, Taleb fought Pete Sell at Ring of Combat 38 for Sell's welterweight championship. Taleb was the much quicker man and was able to move in and out of range quickly, which reduced the amount of strikes he took from Sell. In the second round, Taleb hit Sell with a counter right hand, followed by strikes on the ground. The referee stopped the fight early in the second round and Taleb was declared the ROC Welterweight Champion.

=== Bellator ===
In 2011, Taleb was signed by Bellator and made his debut at Bellator 64 against Matt Secor. Taleb dominated the fight and outclassed Secor enough to be awarded 10-8 rounds by one judge. Taleb was able to take Secor down multiple times and also controlled the stand-up portion of the fight. Taleb won via unanimous decision (30-27, 30-27, 30-24).

Taleb's second fight for Bellator was against Matt MacGrath, which was held as a 180lb. Catchweight bout, due to the fight being contested at short notice. Taleb controlled MacGrath in the opening round, by utilising his reach advantage via straight punches. MacGrath started to come back into the fight in the second round, but was knocked down by a left hand from Taleb. Taleb hit MacGrath with some follow-up shots and was declared the winner via TKO.

Taleb was then entered into the Bellator Season Seven Welterweight Tournament. Taleb's opponent in the quarterfinal was the first-and-only DREAM welterweight champion Marius Žaromskis. Taleb lost via unanimous decision.

=== The Ultimate Fighter ===
In December 2013, it was announced that Taleb was selected as one of the fighters to represent Canada for the upcoming The Ultimate Fighter Nations: Canada vs. Australia. In his first fight on the show, Taleb lost to Tyler Manawaroa via unanimous decision after three rounds.

In a rare move, the UFC revealed in March 2014 that Taleb would also appear as a participant on the next season of the show, The Ultimate Fighter: Team Edgar vs. Team Penn. Taleb lost his preliminary fight to get into the house against Mike King via decision after a sudden victory round.

=== Ultimate Fighting Championship ===
Despite being announced as a participant on The Ultimate Fighter: Team Edgar vs. Team Penn, Taleb appeared on the event leading up to its premiere as he faced fellow contestant Vik Grujic at The Ultimate Fighter Nations Finale. He won the bout via unanimous decision.

Taleb faced Li Jingliang on October 4, 2014 at UFC Fight Night: MacDonald vs. Saffiedine. He won the fight via split decision and marked a successful return to welterweight.

Taleb was expected to face Cláudio Silva on April 25, 2015 at UFC 186. However, Silva was forced out of the bout with a broken foot and replaced by Chris Clements. Taleb won the fight by unanimous decision.

Taleb faced Warlley Alves on August 1, 2015 at UFC 190. He lost the fight by submission in the second round.

Taleb faced Erick Silva on March 5, 2016 at UFC 196. He won the fight via knockout in the second round.

Taleb was expected to face Alan Jouban on July 7, 2016 at UFC Fight Night 90. However, Taleb pulled out of the bout in early June citing an injury.

Taleb faced Santiago Ponzinibbio on February 19, 2017 at UFC Fight Night 105. He lost the fight by unanimous decision.

Taleb was expected to face Emil Weber Meek on 28 May 2017 at UFC Fight Night 109. However, Meek pulled out of the fight on May 12 citing injury. Meek was replaced by promotional newcomer Oliver Enkamp. He won the fight by unanimous decision.

Taleb was expected to face Sultan Aliev on 16 December 2017 at UFC on FOX 26. However, Aliev was removed from the card for undisclosed reasons in early December and was replaced by Danny Roberts. Taleb won the last bout of his contract by knockout in the first round. This win earned him the Performance of the Night bonus.

Taleb faced Cláudio Silva on 27 May 2018 at UFC Fight Night 130. He lost the fight via a rear-naked choke in the first round.

Taleb faced Sean Strickland on 27 October 2018 at UFC Fight Night 138. He lost the fight via technical knockout in the second round.

Taleb was scheduled to face Siyar Bahadurzada on 4 May 2019 at UFC Fight Night: Iaquinta vs. Cowboy. However, it was reported on April 24, 2019 that Bahadurzada pulled out of the bout citing injury, and he is replaced by newcomer Kyle Prepolec. Taleb won the fight via unanimous decision.

Taleb faced Muslim Salikhov on September 7, 2019 at UFC 242. He lost the fight via knockout in round one.

=== Post-UFC career ===
After being released by the UFC, Taleb was expected to headline ARES 2 on April 3, 2020, against Maarten Wouters. However, due to the COVID-19 pandemic, the event was postponed until October 30, 2020.

== Championships and achievements ==
- Ultimate Fighting Championship
  - Performance of the Night (One time) vs. Danny Roberts

== Mixed martial arts record ==
Professional record breakdown
22 matches	15 wins	7 losses
By knockout	7	3
By submission	0	2
By decision	8	2

Res.	Record	Opponent	Method	Event	Date	Round	Time	Location	Notes
Loss	15–7	Muslim Salikhov	KO (punch)	UFC 242	September 7, 2019	1	4:26	Abu Dhabi, United Arab Emirates	
Win	15–6	Kyle Prepolec	Decision (unanimous)	UFC Fight Night: Iaquinta vs. Cowboy	May 4, 2019	3	5:00	Ottawa, Ontario, Canada	
Loss	14–6	Sean Strickland	TKO (punches)	UFC Fight Night: Volkan vs. Smith	October 27, 2018	2	3:10	Moncton, New Brunswick, Canada	
Loss	14–5	Cláudio Silva	Submission (rear-naked choke)	UFC Fight Night: Thompson vs. Till	May 27, 2018	1	4:31	Liverpool, England	
Win	14–4	Danny Roberts	KO (head kick and punch)	UFC on Fox: Lawler vs. dos Anjos	December 16, 2017	1	0:59	Winnipeg, Manitoba, Canada	Performance of the Night.
Win	13–4	Oliver Enkamp	Decision (unanimous)	UFC Fight Night: Gustafsson vs. Teixeira	May 28, 2017	3	5:00	Stockholm, Sweden	
Loss	12–4	Santiago Ponzinibbio	Decision (unanimous)	UFC Fight Night: Lewis vs. Browne	February 19, 2017	3	5:00	Halifax, Nova Scotia, Canada	
Win	12–3	Erick Silva	KO (punch)	UFC 196	March 5, 2016	2	1:34	Las Vegas, Nevada, United States	
Loss	11–3	Warlley Alves	Submission (guillotine choke)	UFC 190	August 1, 2015	2	4:11	Rio de Janeiro, Brazil	
Win	11–2	Chris Clements	Decision (unanimous)	UFC 186	April 25, 2015	3	5:00	Montreal, Quebec, Canada	
Win	10–2	Li Jingliang	Decision (split)	UFC Fight Night: MacDonald vs. Saffiedine	October 4, 2014	3	5:00	Halifax, Nova Scotia, Canada	Return to Welterweight.
Win	9–2	Vik Grujic	Decision (unanimous)	The Ultimate Fighter Nations Finale: Bisping vs. Kennedy	April 16, 2014	3	5:00	Quebec City, Quebec, Canada	Middleweight debut.
Loss	8–2	Marius Žaromskis	Decision (unanimous)	Bellator 74	September 28, 2012	3	5:00	Atlantic City, New Jersey, United States	Bellator Season Seven Welterweight Tournament Quarterfinal.
Win	8–1	Matt MacGrath	TKO (punches)	Bellator 67	May 4, 2012	2	2:30	Rama, Ontario, Canada	Catchweight (180 lbs) bout.
Win	7–1	Matt Secor	Decision (unanimous)	Bellator 64	April 6, 2012	3	5:00	Windsor, Ontario, Canada	
Win	6–1	Pete Sell	TKO (punches)	Ring of Combat 38	November 28, 2011	2	0:53	Atlantic City, New Jersey, United States	Won the Ring of Combat Welterweight Championship.
Win	5–1	Szymon Boniecki	TKO (punches)	UGC 28: Montreal	October 1, 2011	1	1:52	Montreal, Quebec, Canada	
Win	4–1	John Salgado	KO (head kick)	Eye of the Tiger	June 11, 2011	1	2:50	Montreal, Quebec, Canada	
Win	3–1	Chad Cox	Decision (unanimous)	W-1 MMA 6: New Ground	October 23, 2010	3	5:00	Halifax, Nova Scotia, Canada	
Win	2–1	Dean Martins	TKO (punches)	W-1 MMA 4: Bad Blood	March 20, 2010	2	2:54	Montreal, Quebec, Canada	
Loss	1–1	Guillaume DeLorenzi	TKO (punches)	XMMA 3: Ring Extreme	March 14, 2008	3	3:46	Victoriaville, Quebec, Canada	
Win	1–0	Louis-Philippe Carles	Decision (unanimous)	XMMA 2: Gold Rush	November 24, 2007	3	5:00	Victoriaville, Quebec, Canada	

=== Mixed martial arts exhibition record ===
Professional record breakdown
2 matches	0 wins	2 losses
By decision	0	2

Res.	Record	Opponent	Method	Event	Date	Round	Time	Location	Notes
Loss	0–2	Mike King	Decision (unanimous)	The Ultimate Fighter: Team Edgar vs. Team Penn	April 16, 2014 (airdate)	3	5:00	Las Vegas, Nevada, United States	TUF 19 house entry bout.
Loss	0–1	Tyler Manawaroa	Decision (unanimous)	The Ultimate Fighter Nations: Canada vs. Australia	February 7, 2014 (airdate)	3	5:00	Quebec City, Quebec, Canada	Quarter-finals bout.

== See also ==
- List of current UFC fighters
- List of male mixed martial artists
- List of Canadian UFC fighters
