= Chris Clements (fighter) =

Canadian mixed martial arts fighter

- Born: Christopher Clements; February 9, 1976 (age 50); Chatham, Ontario, Canada
- Other names: The Menace
- Height: 5 ft 10 in (1.78 m)
- Weight: 170 lb (77 kg; 12 st 2 lb)
- Division: Welterweight
- Reach: 70.0 in (178 cm)
- Fighting out of: London, Ontario, Canada
- Team: Team Tompkins
- Rank: Black belt in Tae Kwon Do; Blue belt in Brazilian Jiu-Jitsu
- Years active: 2005–present

Mixed martial arts record
- Total: 19
- Wins: 12
- By knockout: 11
- By decision: 1
- Losses: 6
- By knockout: 2
- By submission: 3
- By decision: 1
- No contests: 1

Other information
- Mixed martial arts record from Sherdog

Chris Clements (born February 9, 1976) is a retired Canadian professional mixed martial artist who most recently competed in the Ultimate Fighting Championships(UFC) in the Welterweight division. A professional competitor since 2005, Clements has also formerly competed for the IFL.

== Background ==
Born and raised in Ontario, Canada, Clements began training in Tae Kwon Do ate age 16. Later, he picked up boxing and kickboxing before turning his focus to a professional MMA career.

== Mixed martial arts career ==
=== Early career ===
Clements made his professional MMA debut in June 2005, and fought primarily in his native Canada. In Clements' third fight, opponent Lautaro Tucas charged across the ring at the opening bell with his hands down and was knocked completely out by a right hand from Clements, who had time to deliver a few punches to Tucas' unconscious body before the referee stopped the fight at 3 seconds of the first round, setting a record for the fastest knockout in MMA history. Clements amassed a record of 10-4 with knockout wins over UFC veterans Rich Clementi and Jonathan Goulet before joining the UFC himself in 2012.

=== Ultimate Fighting Championship ===
Clements made his UFC debut against Keith Wisniewski on April 21, 2012 at UFC 145. He won the fight via split decision.

Clements was expected to face Siyar Bahadurzada on July 21, 2012 at UFC 149, replacing an injured Thiago Alves, however, on June 30, Bahadurzada was forced out of the fight. He was replaced by Matthew Riddle. Clements lost the fight via arm-triangle choke in the third round. However, on October 20, 2012, it was revealed that Riddle has tested positive for a banned substance (marijuana) and the result was overturned and changed to a No Contest.

Clements next fought Stephen Thompson on September 21, 2013 at UFC 165. He lost the fight via knockout in the second round.

Clements faced Vik Grujic on November 8, 2014 at UFC Fight Night 55. Clements won the fight via TKO in the first round.

Clements faced Nordine Taleb on April 25, 2015 at UFC 186 after Taleb's original opponent, Cláudio Silva, broke his foot. Clements lost the fight by unanimous decision and was subsequently released from the promotion.

== Mixed martial arts record ==
Professional record breakdown
19 matches	12 wins	6 losses
By knockout	11	2
By submission	0	3
By decision	1	1
No contests	1	

Res.	Record	Opponent	Method	Event	Date	Round	Time	Location	Notes
Loss	12–6 (1)	Nordine Taleb	Decision (unanimous)	UFC 186	April 25, 2015	3	5:00	Montreal, Quebec, Canada	
Win	12–5 (1)	Vik Grujic	TKO (knees and punches)	UFC Fight Night: Rockhold vs. Bisping	November 8, 2014	1	3:06	Sydney, Australia	
Loss	11–5 (1)	Stephen Thompson	KO (punches)	UFC 165	September 21, 2013	2	1:27	Toronto, Ontario, Canada	
NC	11–4 (1)	Matthew Riddle	No Contest (overturned)	UFC 149	July 21, 2012	3	2:02	Calgary, Alberta, Canada	Submission loss overturned after Riddle failed a post-fight test.
Win	11–4	Keith Wisniewski	Decision (split)	UFC 145	April 21, 2012	3	5:00	Atlanta, Georgia, United States	
Win	10–4	Rich Clementi	TKO (punches)	Score Fighting Series 3	December 3, 2011	3	3:17	Sarnia, Ontario, Canada	
Win	9–4	Travis Briere	TKO (spinning back kick)	PFC 1: Border Wars	July 16, 2011	2	0:31	Windsor, Ontario, Canada	
Win	8–4	Jonathan Goulet	KO (punches)	Ringside MMA: Payback	November 12, 2010	2	1:06	Montreal, Quebec, Canada	
Win	7–4	Caleb Grummet	TKO (punches)	XCC: Battle at the Border 10	August 28, 2010	2	1:42	Algonac, Michigan, United States	
Loss	6–4	John Alessio	Submission (guillotine choke)	W-1 MMA 4: Bad Blood	March 20, 2010	1	4:24	Montreal, Quebec, Canada	
Win	6–3	Mark Blackburn	TKO (punches)	Ringside MMA 2: Rage Fighting	August 22, 2009	1	1:52	Montreal, Quebec, Canada	
Loss	5–3	Jesse Bongfeldt	Submission (rear-naked choke)	TKO 30: Apocalypse	September 28, 2007	2	1:57	Montreal, Quebec, Canada	
Loss	5–2	Rory Markham	TKO (punches)	IFL: 2007 Semifinals	August 2, 2007	1	1:17	East Rutherford, New Jersey, United States	
Win	5–1	David Medd	TKO (punches)	TKO 28: Inevitable	February 9, 2007	2	1:54	Montreal, Quebec, Canada	
Win	4–1	Steve Pouliot	TKO (punches)	TKO 27: Reincarnation	September 29, 2006	1	3:16	Montreal, Quebec, Canada	
Win	3–1	Martin Grandmont	TKO (punches)	TKO 26: Heatwave	June 30, 2006	1	4:00	Victoriaville, Quebec, Canada	
Win	2–1	Lautaro Tucas	KO (punch)	TKO 25: Confrontation	May 5, 2006	1	0:03	Montreal, Quebec, Canada	
Loss	1–1	Joey Guel	Submission (rear-naked choke)	Extreme Challenge 63	July 23, 2005	3	0:56	Hayward, Wisconsin, United States	
Win	1–0	Brad Calder	TKO (punches)	UCW 2: Caged Inferno	June 18, 2005	1	1:40	Winnipeg, Manitoba, Canada	

== See also ==
- List of male mixed martial artists
- List of Canadian UFC fighters
