= Cláudio Silva =

Brazilian mixed martial arts fighter

- Born: Cláudio Silva; 6 September 1982 (age 44); Rondonópolis, Brazil
- Other names: Hannibal
- Nationality: Brazilian; British
- Height: 5 ft 11 in (1.80 m)
- Weight: 170 lb (77 kg; 12 st 2 lb)
- Division: Middleweight; Welterweight
- Reach: 71 in (180 cm)
- Fighting out of: Coconut Creek, Florida, United States
- Team: Nova União (formerly); London Shootfighters (2007–present); American Top Team
- Rank: Black belt in Brazilian Jiu-Jitsu under Ricardo Vieira
- Years active: 2007–2023

Mixed martial arts record
- Total: 18
- Wins: 14
- By knockout: 2
- By submission: 9
- By decision: 3
- Losses: 4
- By decision: 3
- By disqualification: 1

Other information
- Mixed martial arts record from Sherdog

Cláudio Silva (born 6 September 1982) is a retired Brazilian-British mixed martial artist who competed in the Welterweight division in Ultimate Fighting Championship, BAMMA, and the Super Fight League.

== Background ==
Silva was born in the Brazilian city of Rondonópolis, and is a son of priestess Claudiu Vitega and retired military officer Fabio Paixao. At the age of seven, he began training karate and later picked up capoeira. At the age of fourteen, Silva joined a gang in which he began dealing drugs and committed numerous other crimes. He began training in Brazilian jiu-jitsu under the tutelage of Elan Santiago and Pawel Czyrnek at the age of 18.

Brazilian jiu-jitsu was my hobby and crime was my profession at that time.

— Cláudio Silva, about his adolescence

Eventually he attempted an armed robbery in a mall, was arrested, and sent to prison. After being released, Silva turned his life around by moving to Poços de Caldas and started training jiu-jitsu full-time under Paulo Rezende. In 2006 he moved to São Paulo where he began training at Brasa with Robert Drysdale. He started training mixed martial arts in 2005 and temporarily moved to Italy where he lived for a time with an aunt before moving to the Greater London area of England in 2007 in an effort to refine his jiu-jitsu.

== Mixed martial arts career ==
=== Early career ===
Silva turned professional in late 2007, competing at both middleweight and welterweight, primarily for regional promotions in England where he compiled a record of 9–1 before signing with the UFC in late 2013.

=== Ultimate Fighting Championship ===
Silva made his promotional debut against Brad Scott on 8 March 2014 at UFC Fight Night 37. Silva won the fight via unanimous decision.

Silva was expected to face Neil Magny in a welterweight bout on 28 June 2014 at UFC Fight Night 43. However, Silva was forced from the bout due to injury and was replaced by promotional newcomer Rodrigo Goiana de Lima.

Silva made his return to the welterweight division and faced Leon Edwards on 8 November 2014 at UFC Fight Night 56. Despite being out-landed on the feet, Silva was able to take Edwards down and obtain dominant positions, repeatedly threatening with submission attempts. Silva defeated Edwards via split decision. 9 out of 11 media outlets scored the bout for Edwards.

Silva was scheduled to face Nordine Taleb on 25 April 2015 at UFC 186. However, Silva pulled out of the bout with a broken foot and was replaced by Chris Clements.

Silva was expected to face Siyar Bahadurzada on 30 July 2016 at UFC 201. However, Silva was forced out of the bout in mid-June with an injury and replaced by Jorge Masvidal.

After an extended hiatus due in part to a litany of lingering injury issues, Silva returned to face Nordine Taleb on 27 May 2018 at UFC Fight Night 130. Silva won the fight via first-round rear-naked choke submission. This win earned him a Performance of the Night award.

Silva was expected to face Ramazan Emeev on 15 September 2018 at UFC Fight Night 136. However, Silva pulled out of the fight in early-September citing a lower back injury.

Silva faced Danny Roberts on 16 March 2019 at UFC Fight Night 147. He won the fight via an armbar submission in the third round.

The bout with Emeev was rescheduled and was expected to take place on 3 August 2019 at UFC on ESPN 5. In turn, Emeev was removed from this event due to alleged visa issues, that restricted his travel to the United States. He was replaced by promotional newcomer Cole Williams. At the weigh-ins, Williams weighed in at 176 pounds, 5 pounds over the welterweight non-title fight limit of 171. As a result, Williams was fined 30 percent of his purse, and the bout proceeded at a catchweight. Silva won the fight via a rear-naked choke submission in the first round.

Silva was scheduled to face Muslim Salikhov on 18 October 2020 at UFC Fight Night: Ortega vs. The Korean Zombie. However, on 4 October, it was announced that Salikhov pulled out due to undisclosed reasons and was replaced by James Krause. He lost the fight via unanimous decision.

Silva faced Court McGee on 22 May 2021 at UFC Fight Night 188 He lost the fight via unanimous decision.

Silva was expected to return after an extended hiatus and face Gunnar Nelson on 19 March 2022 at UFC Fight Night 204. However, Silva pulled out in early March due to a knee injury and was replaced by Takashi Sato.

Silva faced Nicolas Dalby on 23 July 2022, at UFC Fight Night 208. He lost the fight via unanimous decision.

In August 2022, it was announced that Silva was no longer on the UFC roster.

Silva announced his retirement from competing in MMA in January 2023.

== Championships and accomplishments ==
- Ultimate Fighting Championship
  - Performance of the Night (One time) vs. Nordine Taleb

== Mixed martial arts record ==
Professional record breakdown
| 18 matches | 14 wins | 4 losses |
| By knockout | 2 | 0 |
| By submission | 9 | 0 |
| By decision | 3 | 3 |
| By disqualification | 0 | 1 |

| Res. | Record | Opponent | Method | Event | Date | Round | Time | Location | Notes |
|---|---|---|---|---|---|---|---|---|---|
| Loss | 14–4 | Nicolas Dalby | Decision (unanimous) | UFC Fight Night: Blaydes vs. Aspinall | 23 July 2022 | 3 | 5:00 | London, England | |
| Loss | 14–3 | Court McGee | Decision (unanimous) | UFC Fight Night: Font vs. Garbrandt | 22 May 2021 | 3 | 5:00 | Las Vegas, Nevada, United States | |
| Loss | 14–2 | James Krause | Decision (unanimous) | UFC Fight Night: Ortega vs. The Korean Zombie | 18 October 2020 | 3 | 5:00 | Abu Dhabi, United Arab Emirates | |
| Win | 14–1 | Cole Williams | Submission (rear-naked choke) | UFC on ESPN: Covington vs. Lawler | 3 August 2019 | 1 | 2:35 | Newark, New Jersey, United States | Catchweight (176 lb) bout; Williams missed weight. |
| Win | 13–1 | Danny Roberts | Submission (armbar) | UFC Fight Night: Till vs. Masvidal | 16 March 2019 | 3 | 2:37 | London, England | |
| Win | 12–1 | Nordine Taleb | Submission (rear-naked choke) | UFC Fight Night: Thompson vs. Till | 27 May 2018 | 1 | 4:31 | Liverpool, England | Performance of the Night. |
| Win | 11–1 | Leon Edwards | Decision (split) | UFC Fight Night: Shogun vs. Saint Preux | 8 November 2014 | 3 | 5:00 | Uberlândia, Brazil | Welterweight debut. |
| Win | 10–1 | Brad Scott | Decision (unanimous) | UFC Fight Night: Gustafsson vs. Manuwa | 8 March 2014 | 3 | 5:00 | London, England | |
| Win | 9–1 | Xavier Foupa-Pokam | Decision (unanimous) | SFL 6 | 26 October 2012 | 3 | 5:00 | Mumbai, India | |
| Win | 8–1 | Matt Erwin | TKO (injury) | WFC 2 | 9 July 2011 | 2 | 1:34 | London, England | Won the vacant WFC Middleweight Championship. |
| Win | 7–1 | Jean-Francois Lenogue | Submission (rear-naked choke) | BAMMA 5 | 26 February 2011 | 1 | 2:51 | Manchester, England | |
| Win | 6–1 | Aurelijus Kerpe | Submission (armbar) | EFC: Fight for the Fallen | 10 August 2012 | 1 | 3:02 | Essex, England | |
| Win | 5–1 | Denniston Sutherland | Submission (rear-naked choke) | EFC: The Ultimate Battle | 12 September 2010 | 1 | 0:44 | London, England | |
| Win | 4–1 | Earl Brown | Submission (armbar) | EFC: The Ultimate Battle | 12 September 2010 | 1 | 1:41 | London, England | |
| Win | 3–1 | Aurelijus Kerpe | Submission (armbar) | EFC: The Ultimate Battle | 12 September 2010 | 1 | N/A | London, England | |
| Win | 2–1 | Shaun Lomas | Submission (rear-naked choke) | EFC: Collision Course | 16 May 2010 | 1 | 2:02 | Kent, England | |
| Win | 1–1 | Paul Jenkins | TKO (punches) | AM 14: Ready for War | 9 December 2007 | 1 | N/A | Somerset, England | |
| Loss | 0–1 | Matt Thorpe | DQ (illegal elbow) | UWC 5 | 10 November 2007 | 1 | N/A | Essex, England | |

== See also ==
- List of male mixed martial artists
