= Nick Denis =

Canadian mixed martial arts fighter

- Born: October 11, 1983 (age 43); North Bay, Ontario, Canada
- Other names: The Ninja Of Love
- Height: 5 ft 7 in (1.70 m)
- Weight: 135 lb (61 kg; 9.6 st)
- Division: Featherweight; Bantamweight
- Reach: 70.0 in (178 cm)
- Stance: Orthodox
- Fighting out of: Montreal, Quebec, Canada
- Team: Ronin MMA; Tristar Gym
- Rank: Brown belt in Brazilian Jiu-Jitsu; Black belt in Kyokushin kaikan
- Years active: 2006–2012

Mixed martial arts record
- Total: 14
- Wins: 11
- By knockout: 10
- By submission: 1
- Losses: 3
- By knockout: 1
- By submission: 2

Other information
- University: University of Ottawa
- Mixed martial arts record from Sherdog

Nick Denis (born October 11, 1983) is a retired Canadian professional mixed martial artist. A World Victory Road, Aggression Fighting Championship, King of the Cage and UFC veteran, Denis is best known for being a former KOTC Canada Bantamweight Champion, semi-finalist in the Sengoku Featherweight Tournament and his Knockout of the Night victory in his debut fight in the UFC.

== Mixed martial arts career ==
=== Early career ===
Denis made his MMA debut in his native Canada in October 2006. He debuted for the King of the Cage Canada promotion and quickly became their Bantamweight champion.

In 2009, Denis made his international MMA debut for the World Victory Road promotion. He fought in the Sengoku Featherweight Grandprix, making it to the semifinal round.

More recently, he fought against Bellator veteran Nick Mamalis who he defeated via KO (suplex and chokeslam) in the second round.

=== Ultimate Fighting Championship ===
In early December 2011, it was announced that Denis had signed a multi-fight deal with the UFC.

In his UFC debut, Denis faced Joseph Sandoval on January 20, 2012 at UFC on FX: Guillard vs. Miller. He was successful, defeating Sandoval with a series of standing elbows.

Nick was expected to face Johnny Bedford at UFC on Fox 3 on May 5, 2012. However, Bedford was forced out of the bout with an injury and replaced by Roland Delorme. He lost to Delorme by rear-naked choke at 4:59 of an action-packed first round where both fighters were rocked until Delorme rallied and submitted Denis.

In November 2012, Nick announced his retirement from the sport of MMA in a post on his blog, citing research of Chronic traumatic encephalopathy. Denis is frequently quoted and his research is the subject of many discussions on media outlets including MMA Live, The New York Daily News and The Joe Rogan Experience.

== Personal life ==
Denis studied at the University of Ottawa, earning a Bachelor of Science in Biochemistry. Nick also invested part of his "Knockout of the Night" win bonus in purchasing land, owning a large part of land in North Stormont, Ontario, Canada. A fan of board games, Denis has recently designed an algorithm for efficiently playing SeaFall.

== Championships and accomplishments ==
- King of the Cage
  - KOTC Canada Bantamweight Championship (One time)
  - One successful title defense
- Ultimate Fighting Championship
  - Knockout of the Night (One time) vs. Joseph Sandoval

== Mixed martial arts record ==
Professional record breakdown
14 matches	11 wins	3 losses
By knockout	10	1
By submission	1	2

Res.	Record	Opponent	Method	Event	Date	Round	Time	Location	Notes
Loss	11–3	Roland Delorme	Submission (rear-naked choke)	UFC on Fox: Diaz vs. Miller	May 5, 2012	1	4:59	East Rutherford, New Jersey, United States	
Win	11–2	Joseph Sandoval	KO (elbows)	UFC on FX: Guillard vs. Miller	January 20, 2012	1	0:22	Nashville, Tennessee, United States	Knockout of the Night.
Win	10–2	Nick Mamalis	KO (suplex and chokeslam)	Wreck MMA: Unfinished Business	October 28, 2011	2	1:03	Gatineau, Quebec, Canada	Return to Bantamweight.
Loss	9–2	Yuji Hoshino	Submission (guillotine choke)	World Victory Road Presents: Sengoku Raiden Championships 12	March 7, 2010	2	0:47	Tokyo, Japan	
Win	9–1	Sean Quinn	KO (punches)	Wreck MMA: Fights for the Troops	December 12, 2009	1	3:42	Gatineau, Quebec, Canada	
Win	8–1	Jason Townes	TKO (knee and kick to the body)	AMMA 1: First Blood	October 24, 2009	2	1:26	Edmonton, Alberta, Canada	
Loss	7–1	Marlon Sandro	KO (punches)	World Victory Road Presents: Sengoku 8	May 2, 2009	1	0:19	Tokyo, Japan	Sengoku Featherweight Grandprix Second Round.
Win	7–0	Seiya Kawahara	TKO (punches)	World Victory Road Presents: Sengoku 7	March 20, 2009	1	2:36	Tokyo, Japan	Sengoku Featherweight Grandprix Opening Round.
Win	6–0	Josh Kyrejto	KO (punch)	KOTC: Excalibur	July 19, 2008	1	4:59	Edmonton, Alberta Canada	Fought at Featherweight.
Win	5–0	Josh Gallant	KO (punches)	KOTC: Brawl at the Mall 3	April 4, 2008	2	3:14	Edmonton, Alberta, Canada	Defends KOTC Canada Bantamweight Championship.
Win	4–0	Dave Scholten	TKO (punch to the body)	KOTC: Brawl at the Mall 2	October 19, 2007	3	0:23	Edmonton, Alberta, Canada	Wins KOTC Canada Bantamweight Championship.
Win	3–0	Chris Myra	TKO (punches)	KOTC: Capital Chaos	March 28, 2007	1	1:40	Montreal, Quebec, Canada	
Win	2–0	Jean-Robert Monier	Submission (armbar)	KOTC: Freedom Fight	January 20, 2007	1	4:33	Montreal, Quebec, Canada	
Win	1–0	Justin Darbyson	KO (punches)	APEX: A Night Of Champions	October 16, 2006	2	2:24	Montreal, Quebec, Canada	

== See also ==
- List of male mixed martial artists
- List of KOTC champions
- List of Canadian UFC fighters
