= UFC 186 =

UFC mixed martial arts event in 2015

UFC 186: Johnson vs. Horiguchi
- The poster for UFC 186: Johnson vs. Horiguchi
- Promotion: Ultimate Fighting Championship
- Date: April 25, 2015
- Venue: Bell Centre
- City: Montreal, Quebec, Canada
- Attendance: 10,154
- Total gate: $668,000
- Buyrate: 125,000

Event chronology
UFC on Fox: Machida vs. Rockhold	UFC 186: Johnson vs. Horiguchi	UFC Fight Night: Miocic vs. Hunt

UFC 186: Johnson vs. Horiguchi was a mixed martial arts event held on April 25, 2015, at the Bell Centre in Montreal, Quebec, Canada.

== Background ==
The event was the seventh event that the UFC has hosted in Montreal, Quebec.

The event was expected to be headlined by a UFC Bantamweight Championship rematch between the then current champion T.J. Dillashaw and former champion Renan Barão. However, on March 24, it was announced that Dillashaw had to pull out of the fight due to a broken rib and the fight was postponed. A UFC Flyweight Championship bout between current champion Demetrious Johnson and top contender Kyoji Horiguchi, originally scheduled for the co-main event, served as the event's headliner.

A welterweight bout between Rory MacDonald and Héctor Lombard was expected to take place at the event. However, on February 10, the UFC announced the removal of both participants from the card and indicated that the pairing had been scrapped. It was later revealed that the fight was canceled due to Lombard's failed drug test from UFC 182. Subsequently, it was announced that MacDonald would receive a title shot against current champion Robbie Lawler at UFC 189.

Cláudio Silva was expected to face Nordine Taleb at the event. However, Silva pulled out of the bout for undisclosed reasons and was replaced by Chris Clements.

Abel Trujillo was expected to face John Makdessi at the event. However, on April 1, it was announced that Trujillo had pulled out of the fight due to a broken arm and was replaced by promotional newcomer Shane Campbell. The fight was contested at a catchweight of 160 lb.

Former UFC Light Heavyweight champion Quinton Jackson was expected to make his promotional return against Fábio Maldonado at the co-main event. However, on April 7, Bellator MMA, Jackson's most recent employer, was granted an injunction by a New Jersey Superior Court judge preventing him from competing after it was alleged that he breached his Bellator contract. Three days later the UFC announced that Jackson would be replaced by former ice hockey player Steve Bossé and stated "at the moment, Jackson and his representatives plan to appeal the court’s order." On April 21, the court injunction blocking Jackson's return was lifted. The bout maintained its original co-main event status and was contested at a catchweight of 215 lb. Bossé did not compete at the event, but received his show money.

== Results ==
Main Card
Weight class				Method	Round	Time	Notes
Flyweight	Demetrious Johnson (c)	def.	Kyoji Horiguchi	Submission (armbar)	5	4:59	(Note: For the UFC Flyweight Championship. Latest finish in UFC history.)
Catchweight (215 lb)	Quinton Jackson	def.	Fábio Maldonado	Decision (unanimous) (29–28, 30–27, 30–27)	3	5:00
Middleweight	Michael Bisping	def.	C. B. Dollaway	Decision (unanimous) (29–28, 29–28, 29–28)	3	5:00
Catchweight (160 lb)	John Makdessi	def.	Shane Campbell	TKO (punches)	1	4:53
Bantamweight	Thomas Almeida	def.	Yves Jabouin	TKO (punches)	1	4:18
Preliminary Card (Fox Sports 1)
Welterweight	Patrick Côté	def.	Joe Riggs	Decision (unanimous) (29–28, 29–28, 29–28)	3	5:00
Women's Bantamweight	Alexis Davis	def.	Sarah Kaufman	Submission (armbar)	2	1:52
Lightweight	Chad Laprise	def.	Bryan Barberena	Decision (unanimous) (29–28, 29–28, 30–27)	3	5:00
Lightweight	Olivier Aubin-Mercier	def.	David Michaud	Submission (rear-naked choke)	3	1:36
Preliminary Card (UFC Fight Pass)
Welterweight	Nordine Taleb	def.	Chris Clements	Decision (unanimous) (30–27, 30–27, 30–27)	3	5:00
Women's Strawweight	Valérie Létourneau	def.	Jessica Rakoczy	Decision (unanimous) (29–28, 29–28, 30–27)	3	5:00
Women's Strawweight	Randa Markos	def.	Aisling Daly	Decision (unanimous) (30–27, 29–28, 29–28)	3	5:00

== Bonus awards ==
The following fighters were awarded $50,000 bonuses:

- Fight of the Night: Chad Laprise vs. Bryan Barberena
- Performance of the Night: Demetrious Johnson and Thomas Almeida

== See also ==
- List of UFC events
- 2015 in UFC
