= UFC 3 =

UFC mixed martial arts event in 1994

UFC 3: The American Dream
- The poster for UFC 3: The American Dream
- Promotion: Ultimate Fighting Championship
- Date: September 9, 1994
- Venue: Grady Cole Center
- City: Charlotte, North Carolina
- Attendance: 3,000
- Buyrate: 90,000

Event chronology
UFC 2: No Way Out	UFC 3: The American Dream	UFC 4: Revenge of the Warriors

The Ultimate Fighting Championship III (later renamed UFC 3: The American Dream) was a mixed martial arts (MMA) event held by the Ultimate Fighting Championship (UFC) on September 9, 1994, at Grady Cole Center in Charlotte, North Carolina, United States. The event was seen live on pay-per-view in the United States, and was later released on home video.

== History ==
UFC 3 used an eight-man tournament format, with the winner receiving $60,000. The tournament had no weight classes or weight limits. Each match had no time limit or rounds; therefore no judges were used for the night. Competitors could only win a match by submission, throwing in the towel, knockout, or referee stoppage. This event marked the first time the referee was given the authority to stop the contest. The referee for the night was once again "Big" John McCarthy.

Replacement fighter Steve Jennum won the tournament by defeating Harold Howard via submission due to strikes, despite only fighting in the finals. Jennum was a replacement for Ken Shamrock, who made it to the finals but withdrew due to injury. This was the first UFC tournament that was not won by Royce Gracie, who won his quarterfinal fight but withdrew as the semifinal fight was about to start, likely due to fatigue from the previous round. After Jennum won UFC 3 as an alternate, UFC instituted alternate qualifying bouts to balance out fatigue, and to lessen the advantage that alternates previously had entering the tournament without fighting quarterfinal bouts.

== Results ==
Final
Weight class				Method	Round	Time	Notes
N/A	Steve Jennum	def.	Harold Howard	TKO (submission to punches)		1:27	(Note: Jennum was a replacement for Ken Shamrock who withdrew due to injury.)
Semifinals
N/A	Ken Shamrock	def.	Felix Mitchell	Submission (rear-naked choke)		4:34	(Note: Keith Hackney was forced to withdraw due to injury. He was replaced by Felix Mitchell.)
Quarterfinals
N/A	Keith Hackney	def.	Emmanuel Yarbrough	TKO (punches)		1:59
N/A	Ken Shamrock	def.	Christophe Leininger	TKO (submission to punches)		4:49
N/A	Harold Howard	def.	Roland Payne	KO (punch)		0:46
N/A	Royce Gracie	def.	Kimo Leopoldo	Submission (armlock)		4:40	(Note: Due to fatigue sustained during the fight, Gracie was unable to continue in the tournament.)

== UFC 3 bracket ==
Quarterfinals
(United States) Keith Hackney (Kenpo)	TKO
(United States) Emmanuel Yarborough (Sumo)	1:59
(United States) Ken Shamrock (Shootfighting)	TKO
(United States) Christophe Leininger (Judo)	4:49
(Canada) Harold Howard (Gōjū-ryū)	KO
(United States) Roland Payne (Muay Thai)	0:46
(Brazil) Royce Gracie (Brazilian Jiu-Jitsu)	SUB
(United States) Kimo Leopoldo (Taekwondo)	4:40

Semifinals
(United States) Felix Mitchell^{1}(Kung fu)	4:34
(United States) Ken Shamrock	SUB
(Canada) Harold Howard	—
(Brazil) Royce Gracie^{2}	—

Finals
(United States) Steve Jennum^{3}(Ninjutsu)	TKO
(Canada) Harold Howard	1:27

^{1}Keith Hackney was forced to withdraw due to injury. He was replaced by Felix Mitchell.
^{2}Royce Gracie's corner threw in the towel before the fight, so Harold Howard was given a bye into the final.
^{3}It was announced that Ken Shamrock was injured at the event and could not continue. Steve Jennum replaced him.

== Encyclopedia awards ==
The following fighters were honored in the October 2011 book titled UFC Encyclopedia.

- Fight of the Night: Royce Gracie vs. Kimo Leopoldo
- Knockout of the Night: Keith Hackney def. Emmanuel Yarbrough
- Submission of the Night: Royce Gracie def. Kimo Leopoldo

== See also ==
- Ultimate Fighting Championship
- List of UFC champions
- List of UFC events
- 1994 in UFC
