= UFC on Fox: Diaz vs. Miller =

UFC mixed martial arts event in 2012

- The poster for UFC on Fox: Diaz vs. Miller
- Promotion: Ultimate Fighting Championship
- Date: May 5, 2012
- Venue: IZOD Center
- City: East Rutherford, New Jersey
- Attendance: 10,788
- Total gate: $1,100,000

Event chronology
UFC 145: Jones vs. Evans	UFC on Fox: Diaz vs. Miller	UFC on Fuel TV: The Korean Zombie vs. Poirier

UFC on Fox: Diaz vs. Miller (also known as UFC on Fox 3) was a mixed martial arts event held by the Ultimate Fighting Championship on May 5, 2012 at the IZOD Center in East Rutherford, New Jersey.

== Background ==
Dennis Hallman was expected to face Tony Ferguson at the event, but Hallman was forced out of the bout with an injury and replaced by Thiago Tavares. Tavares himself was also forced from the bout with an injury and replaced by Michael Johnson.

Darren Uyenoyama was expected to face John Dodson at the event, but Uyenoyama was forced out of the bout and was replaced by promotional newcomer Tim Elliott.

Johnny Bedford was expected to face Nick Denis at the event, but Bedford was forced out of the bout with an injury and replaced by Roland Delorme.

During the official weigh ins, John Lineker failed to make the flyweight limit, coming in one pound over. Lineker was fined and his bout with Louis Gaudinot was contested at a catchweight of 127 pounds.

== Results ==
Main Card (Fox)
Weight class				Method	Round	Time	Notes
Lightweight	Nate Diaz	def.	Jim Miller	Submission (guillotine choke)	2	4:09
Welterweight	Johny Hendricks	def.	Josh Koscheck	Decision (split) (29–28, 28–29, 29–28)	3	5:00
Middleweight	Alan Belcher	def.	Rousimar Palhares	TKO (punches and elbows)	1	4:18
Heavyweight	Lavar Johnson	def.	Pat Barry	TKO (punches)	1	4:38
Preliminary card (Fuel TV)
Lightweight	Michael Johnson	def.	Tony Ferguson	Decision (unanimous) (30–27, 30–27, 30–27)	3	5:00
Flyweight	John Dodson	def.	Tim Elliott	Decision (unanimous) (29–28, 29–28, 29–28)	3	5:00
Welterweight	John Hathaway	def.	Pascal Krauss	Decision (unanimous) (29–28, 30–27, 30–27)	3	5:00
Catchweight (127lb)	Louis Gaudinot	def.	John Lineker	Technical Submission (guillotine choke)	2	4:54
Lightweight	Danny Castillo	def.	John Cholish	Decision (unanimous) (30–27, 30–27, 30–27)	3	5:00
Featherweight	Dennis Bermudez	def.	Pablo Garza	Decision (unanimous) (30–27, 30–27, 30–27)	3	5:00
Preliminary card (Facebook)
Bantamweight	Roland Delorme	def.	Nick Denis	Submission (rear-naked choke)	1	4:59
Middleweight	Karlos Vemola	def.	Mike Massenzio	Submission (rear-naked choke)	2	1:07

== Bonus awards ==
The following fighters received $65,000 bonuses.

- Fight of the Night: Louis Gaudinot vs. John Lineker
- Knockout of the Night: Lavar Johnson
- Submission of the Night: Nate Diaz

== See also ==
- List of UFC events
- 2012 in UFC
