= Harold Howard =

Canadian martial artist

- Born: Harold Clarence Howard; 1958 (age 67–68); Niagara Falls, Ontario, Canada
- Height: 6 ft 2 in (1.88 m)
- Weight: 240 lb (110 kg; 17 st)
- Division: Heavyweight (265lbs)
- Style: Karate, Jujutsu
- Rank: 6th Dan Black Belt in Katsudo-Te-Jitsu; 3rd Dan Black Belt in Kitsune Ryu Jiu-Jitsu; 2nd Dan Black Belt in Goju-Ryu Karate; 2nd Dan Black Belt in Chito-Ryu Karate

Mixed martial arts record
- Total: 4
- Wins: 1
- By knockout: 1
- Losses: 3
- By submission: 3

Other information
- Mixed martial arts record from Sherdog

Harold Clarence Howard (born 1958) is a Canadian retired martial artist who earned a blackbelt in Jujutsu under Steve Reynolds and in Gōjū-Ryū Karate under Yogi Israel and was the first World Sport Jujutsu Heavyweight Champion in 1984. Howard is more widely known for competing in the Ultimate Fighting Championship where he made it to the final of the Ultimate Fighting Championship's third tournament. Howard is also well known for once executing a scissor-flip kick during his battle with Steve Jennum in the UFC 3 finals.

== Biography ==
=== Early life ===
Howard grew up in Richmond Hill, Ontario. He began training at age 17 with Steve Reynolds in Jiu-Jitsu Kai. Harold moved to Niagara Falls in 1983 and taught Karate and Jiu Jitsu at James Morden School and the YMCA. Harold opened his Action Karate and Jiu Jitsu Centre (as the Niagara Fighting Griffin Fitness and Martial Arts) in 1984 and has excelled both as a competitor and as a trainer/coach having various students among the top Sport Karate and Sport Jiu-Jitsu competitors in the world.

Howard has earned a 3rd degree in Jujutsu under ( Steve Reynolds), a 3rd degree in Gojo-ryu (Yogi Israel), and a 2nd degree in Chito-Ryu (Monty Guest). He is the founder of the Katsudo-te-Jitsu style and is a 6th Degree - 2 grades above his highest ranking students.

=== Jujutsu ===
In 1984, Harold was the first Canadian Heavyweight Sport Ju-Jutsu Champion and represented Canada in the first world ju-jutsu championships sanctioned by the World Council of Ju-Jutsu Organizations (WCJO).

At the 1984 World Championships, he was a member of the gold medal winning Canadian team (heavyweight) and also won the individual World Heavyweight Jiu-Jitsu Championship as the gold medal winner of the men's heavyweight fighting division.

=== Karate ===
Howard captured the Canadian Heavy Weight Karate Championship three times in 1982, 1983 and 1984 and was a member of the Canadian National Karate team in 1986 and 1987. During that time he was the top rated sport karate fighter in Canada.

After potentially career ending back surgery in 1988, Howard made his return to competition in 1992 (at 34) and won a silver medal at the NBL (National Blackbelt League) World Championships in Sport Karate. He was undefeated entering the finals but had to bow out of the final 2 matches due to injury.

=== Mixed martial arts ===
With a final record of 1–3 in NHB(No Holds Barred) what would later become known as mixed martial arts, Howard went 1–2 in the UFC.

== Personal life ==
Harold is married with three children, a daughter and two sons. Up until 2009, Howard was doing roofing jobs while still operating a small school—Howard’s Self-Defense Systems in Niagara Falls, Ontario.

On December 22, 2009, Howard was charged with two counts of attempted murder, two counts of assault with a weapon, attempted breaking and entering, failure to remain, flight from police, dangerous operation of a motor vehicle, mischief and two counts breach of recognizance after being captured by police. The events leading to said arrest include attacking his sister and nephew with a hammer, attempting to force his way into his estranged wife's home, and finally crashing his car into the Fallsview Casino. In the end, Harold was sentenced to just shy of five years in prison.

== Mixed martial arts record ==
Professional record breakdown
4 matches	1 win	3 losses
By knockout	1	3

Res.	Record	Opponent	Method	Event	Date	Round	Time	Location	Notes
Loss	1–3	Hugo Duarte	TKO (submission to punches)	UVF 3 - Universal Vale Tudo Fighting 3	August 14, 1996	1	0:29	Tokyo, Japan	
Loss	1–2	Mark Hall	TKO (submission to punches)	UFC 7	September 8, 1995	1	1:41	Buffalo, New York, United States	
Loss	1–1	Steve Jennum	TKO (submission to punches)	UFC 3	September 9, 1994	1	1:27	Charlotte, North Carolina, United States	
Win	1–0	Roland Payne	KO (punch)	UFC 3	September 9, 1994	1	0:46	Charlotte, North Carolina, United States	
