= Roland Delorme =

Canadian mixed martial artist

- Born: Roland Camille Roger Delorme; December 18, 1983 (age 42); Winnipeg, Manitoba, Canada
- Other names: Stunning
- Height: 5 ft 9 in (1.75 m)
- Weight: 135 lb (61 kg; 9.6 st)
- Division: Bantamweight
- Reach: 71 in (180 cm)
- Fighting out of: Winnipeg, Manitoba, Canada
- Team: Winnipeg Academy of Mixed Martial Arts
- Rank: Black Belt in Judo; Brown Belt in Brazilian Jiu-Jitsu
- Years active: 2007–present

Mixed martial arts record
- Total: 17
- Wins: 10
- By knockout: 2
- By submission: 7
- By decision: 1
- Losses: 6
- By knockout: 2
- By submission: 1
- By decision: 3
- No contests: 1

Other information
- Mixed martial arts record from Sherdog

Roland Camille Roger Delorme (born December 18, 1983) is a Canadian mixed martial artist who formerly competed in the bantamweight division of the Ultimate Fighting Championship. He was a competitor on Spike TV's The Ultimate Fighter: Team Bisping vs. Team Miller.

== MMA career ==
=== Early career ===
Delorme amassed a 7–2 record before going on The Ultimate Fighter, fighting exclusively in his native Canada.

=== The Ultimate Fighter ===
Delorme was picked last for Team Miller after beating B.J. Ferguson by triangle choke in the preliminary fights. He did not make the semi-finals, as he lost to T.J. Dillashaw by submission at the end of the second round after being outwrestled and constantly being taken down throughout the fight.

=== Ultimate Fighting Championship ===
Delorme fought Josh Ferguson at The Ultimate Fighter 14 Finale, winning via submission in the third round.

Delorme fought Nick Denis on May 5, 2012 at UFC on Fox: Diaz vs. Miller, replacing an injured Johnny Bedford. He beat Denis by rear-naked choke at 4:59 of an action-packed first round where both fighters were rocked until Delorme rallied and submitted Denis.

Delorme was briefly linked to a bout against promotional newcomer Bibiano Fernandes on July 21, 2012 at UFC 149. However, Fernandes did not sign with the UFC. Delorme instead faced Francisco Rivera at the event. He lost via KO at 4:19 of the first round. The result, however, was later changed to a No Contest when it was revealed Rivera had tested positive for a banned substance.

Delorme faced Edwin Figueroa on June 15, 2013 at UFC 161. He won the exciting back-and-forth fight by unanimous decision.

Delorme then faced Alex Caceres on September 21, 2013 at UFC 165. He lost the back-and-forth fight via split decision.

Delorme was expected to face Davey Grant on March 8, 2014 at UFC Fight Night 37. However the fight was cancelled after the weigh ins the day before the event due to Grant suffering a torn meniscus.

Delorme faced promotional newcomer Michinori Tanaka on June 14, 2014 at UFC 174. He lost the fight via unanimous decision.

Delorme next faced promotional newcomer Ulka Sasaki on August 23, 2014 at UFC Fight Night 48. He lost the fight via submission in the first round, and was subsequently released from the promotion shortly after.

== Mixed martial arts record ==
Professional record breakdown
16 matches	10 wins	6 losses
By knockout	2	2
By submission	7	1
By decision	1	3

Res.	Record	Opponent	Method	Event	Date	Round	Time	Location	Notes
Loss	10–6 (1)	Jesse Arnett	TKO (punches)	SFL 42: Fight Night at the Corral	August 15, 2015	2	3:00	Calgary, Alberta, Canada	
Loss	10–5 (1)	Ulka Sasaki	Submission (rear-naked choke)	UFC Fight Night: Bisping vs. Le	August 23, 2014	1	1:06	Macau, SAR, China	
Loss	10–4 (1)	Michinori Tanaka	Decision (unanimous)	UFC 174	June 14, 2014	3	5:00	Vancouver, British Columbia, Canada	
Loss	10–3 (1)	Alex Caceres	Decision (split)	UFC 165	September 21, 2013	3	5:00	Toronto, Ontario, Canada	
Win	10–2 (1)	Edwin Figueroa	Decision (unanimous)	UFC 161	June 15, 2013	3	5:00	Winnipeg, Manitoba, Canada	
NC	9–2 (1)	Francisco Rivera	NC (overturned loss)	UFC 149	July 21, 2012	1	4:19	Calgary, Alberta, Canada	Originally a KO (punches) win for Rivera; overturned after he tested positive for ephedra.
Win	9–2	Nick Denis	Submission (rear-naked choke)	UFC on Fox: Diaz vs. Miller	May 5, 2012	1	4:59	East Rutherford, New Jersey, United States	
Win	8–2	Josh Ferguson	Submission (rear-naked choke)	The Ultimate Fighter: Team Bisping vs. Team Miller Finale	December 3, 2011	3	0:22	Las Vegas, Nevada, United States	
Loss	7–2	Eric Wilson	Decision (split)	Canadian Fighting Championship 6	October 8, 2010	3	5:00	Winnipeg, Manitoba, Canada	
Win	7–1	Sean Quinn	TKO (punches)	Canadian Fighting Championship 5	June 4, 2010	2	3:02	Winnipeg, Manitoba, Canada	
Win	6–1	Remi Morvan	Submission (rear-naked choke)	Canadian Fighting Championship 4	February 26, 2010	1	2:28	Winnipeg, Manitoba, Canada	
Win	5–1	Remi Morvan	Submission (armbar)	Wreck MMA	December 12, 2009	1	4:21	Gatineau, Quebec, Canada	
Win	4–1	Stephane Denis	TKO (punches)	Canadian Fighting Championship 3	November 13, 2009	2	4:40	Winnipeg, Manitoba, Canada	
Win	3–1	Matt Veal	Submission (rear-naked choke)	UCW 16	June 19, 2009	1	3:30	Winnipeg, Manitoba, Canada	
Win	2–1	Dwight Sutherland	Submission (armbar)	UCW 13	September 12, 2008	1	4:40	Winnipeg, Manitoba, Canada	
Loss	1–1	Adam Lorenz	TKO (punches)	Ultimate Martial Arts Championship 7	September 15, 2007	2	0:03	Regina, Saskatchewan, Canada	
Win	1–0	Clayton Vallance	Submission (rear-naked choke)	Firestorm MMA 2	March 17, 2007	1	0:23	Canada	
