= Jason Macdonald =

- Born: 3 November 1980 (age 46) Lawrence, New Zealand
- Height: 1.8 m (5 ft 11 in)
- Weight: 108 kg (238 lb)

Rugby union career
- Position: Hooker
Provincial / State sides
Years	Team	Apps	(Points)
2002-12	Otago	63	(15)
Super Rugby
Years	Team	Apps	(Points)
2006-2008	Highlanders	29	(10)
2009	Crusaders	13	(5)
2010	Highlanders	7	(0)

Jason Macdonald (born 3 November 1980 in Lawrence, New Zealand) is a rugby union player who plays at hooker for Otago in the ITM Cup. He has previously played in the Super 14 competition for the Highlanders and Crusaders, but his career is currently on hold following a ruptured Achilles tendon.

== Playing career ==
=== Provincial Rugby ===
Macdonald is one of the longest-serving members of the current Otago squad, having made his debut for the province in 2002. He missed the entire 2010 ITM Cup after being injured during the 2010 Super 14 campaign.

=== Super Rugby ===
Macdonald was included in the Highlanders squad for the 2006 Super 14 season, during which he made his first start for the club and scored his first Super Rugby try. Over the following two seasons, he progressed into a more regular member of the squad, and was the club's regular hooker for the 2008 campaign, starting 10 of 13 matches.

Prior to the 2009 Super 14 season, Macdonald was surprisingly left available in the draft and claimed by the Crusaders. He went on to enjoy his most successful season of Super Rugby, starting 12 matches in place of injured All-Black Corey Flynn, including the team's semi-final appearance against the Bulls.

For 2010, Macdonald found himself back with the Highlanders, appearing mainly off the bench as the starting job at hooker was claimed by Jason Rutledge. His season was ultimately ended mid-stream by an Achilles injury, suffered while playing club rugby during a schedule break, that limited him to just 7 matches.

After missing the entire 2010 ITM Cup due to his ruptured Achilles tendon, MacDonald was not included in the Highlanders squad for the 2011 Super Rugby season.
