= Steve Jennum =

American mixed martial arts (MMA) fighter

- Born: 23 September 1963 (age 63); Omaha, Nebraska, United States
- Other names: Ninja Cop
- Nationality: American
- Height: 5 ft 10 in (1.78 m)
- Weight: 195 lb (88 kg; 13.9 st)
- Division: Openweight
- Style: Ninjutsu, Taijutsu, Taekwondo, Brazilian Jiu-Jitsu, Muay Thai, Judo, Wrestling, Boxing
- Fighting out of: Omaha, Nebraska
- Team: Robert Bussey's Warrior International
- Teacher: Robert Bussey
- Rank: 3rd Dan Black Belt in Ninjutsu
- Years active: 1994–1997 (MMA)

Mixed martial arts record
- Total: 5
- Wins: 2
- By knockout: 1
- By submission: 1
- Losses: 3
- By knockout: 1
- By submission: 2

Other information
- Mixed martial arts record from Sherdog

Steve Jennum (born 23 September 1963) is an American police officer from Nebraska and retired mixed martial arts fighter. He is notable for winning the UFC 3 tournament in 1994 as an alternate, representing ninjutsu.

Jennum entered the tournament after one of the scheduled competitors withdrew and ultimately won the tournament after competing in only one bout. Jennum subsequently competed in UFC 4 and Ultimate Ultimate 1995, before fighting in the World Vale Tudo Championship and Extreme Challenge. He ended his mixed martial arts career in 1997 with a professional record of 2–3 and continued his career in law enforcement. His UFC 3 victory remains notable as one of the most unusual tournament wins in the early history of the UFC.

== Mixed martial arts career ==
Jennum entered the UFC 3 tournament as an alternate, representing ninjutsu through Robert Bussey's Warrior International (RBWI), where Jennum was a high ranking Black Belt instructor. Previously at UFC 2, his teammate Scott Morris had advanced to the quarterfinals before violently losing to Patrick Smith.

Ken Shamrock made it to the finals of UFC 3 but withdrew due to injuries received in the earlier fight against Felix Mitchell. Jennum then stepped in as a replacement to fight Canadian Gōjū-ryū karate representative Harold Howard and subsequently won his fight by TKO at 1:27, winning the tournament. Therefore, Jennum only needed one fight to win the UFC 3 tournament (normally a fighter would have had to participate in three matches to win). This anomaly prompted the UFC to change its rules, requiring alternates to win a preliminary fight to balance the advantage of being an alternate.

After UFC 3, Steve Jennum would go on to win only one more fight in his career, defeating Melton Bowen in UFC 4, who was 31–6 as a professional boxer going into the bout. Jennum performed a high-profile O goshi hip throw on the boxer, much to the delight of the crowd, eventually forcing him to submit to a straight armbar. Jennum could not continue in UFC 4 due to swelling of his hands after hitting Bowen repeatedly in the head when Jennum was on full mount.

At Ultimate Ultimate 1995, an UFC event featuring former tournament winners and notable fighters from previous UFC events, Jennum faced David "Tank" Abbott in the quarterfinals. Abbott defeated Jennum by neck crank at 1:14 of the first round, eliminating him from the tournament.

In August 1996, Jennum traveled to Japan to compete at the inaugural World Vale Tudo Championship (WVC). He faced Brazilian fighter Marco Ruas, a Vale Tudo veteran and the winner of the UFC 7 tournament, in a superfight at WVC 1. Ruas defeated Jennum by TKO via punches at 1:44 of the first round, winning the WVC Superfight Championship in the process.

Jennum's final professional match took place at Extreme Challenge 4 on February 22, 1997, where he faced Jason Godsey in the main event. Godsey defeated Jennum by submission via choke at 2:02 of the first round. The loss left Jennum with a professional record of 2–3.

Jennum subsequently ended his fighting career and returned his focus to law enforcement. He later cited concerns over the legal and public scrutiny surrounding no-holds-barred contests could jeopardize his career as a police officer, particularly following an incident at Ultimate Ultimate 1995 in which fighters faced the possibility of arrest. Jennum also started his own martial arts school in Omaha, Nebraska where he taught Robert Bussey's ninjutsu. Former UFC Welterweight Champion Georges St-Pierre mentioned that watching Jennum win UFC 3 contributed to his decision to compete in mixed martial arts.

== Championships and accomplishments ==
- Ultimate Fighting Championship
  - UFC 3 Ultimate Fighting Champion

== Mixed martial arts record ==
Professional record breakdown
5 matches	2 wins	3 losses
By knockout	1	1
By submission	1	2

Res.	Record	Opponent	Method	Event	Date	Round	Time	Location	Notes
Loss	2–3	Jason Godsey	Submission (choke)	Extreme Challenge 4	February 22, 1997	1	2:02	Council Bluffs, Iowa, United States	
Loss	2–2	Marco Ruas	TKO (submission to punches)	World Vale Tudo Championship 1	August 14, 1996	1	1:44	Tokyo, Japan	
Loss	2–1	Tank Abbott	Submission (neck crank)	Ultimate Ultimate 1995	December 16, 1995	1	1:14	Denver, Colorado, United States	
Win	2–0	Melton Bowen	Submission (armbar)	UFC 4	December 16, 1994	1	4:47	Tulsa, Oklahoma, United States	
Win	1–0	Harold Howard	TKO (submission to punches)	UFC 3	September 9, 1994	1	1:27	Charlotte, North Carolina, United States	Won UFC 3 Tournament.
