= Mixed martial arts in Canada =

- Country: Canada
- Governing body: Canadian Combat Alliance
- National team: Canada

Mixed martial arts in Canada is currently the most popular combat sport, surpassing boxing and judo.

== History ==
For many years, professional MMA competitions were illegal in Canada. Section 83(2) of the Canadian Criminal Code deemed that only boxing matches where only fists are used are considered legal. However most provinces regulated it by a provincial athletic commission (skirting S. 83(2) by classifying MMA as "mixed boxing"), such as the provinces of Manitoba, Ontario, Nova Scotia, Quebec, and Northwest Territories. The legality of MMA in the provinces of Alberta, British Columbia, and New Brunswick varies depending on the municipality. Professional MMA competitions remain illegal in the Canadian provinces of Newfoundland and Labrador, Prince Edward Island, Saskatchewan, Yukon, and Nunavut because it is not regulated by an athletic commission.

Canada formally decriminalized mixed martial arts with a vote on Bill S-209 on June 5, 2013. The bill formally gives provinces the power to create athletic commissions to regulate and sanction professional mixed martial arts bouts. Bill S-209 does not in and of itself make MMA legal across Canada; it allows provinces to make it legal on a province by province basis.

== Organizations ==
=== Current ===
- Prospect Fighting Championships
- TKO Major League MMA
- World Series of Fighting: Canada

=== Defunct ===
- The Fight Club
- Maximum Fighting Championship
- Wreck MMA

== See also ==
- Mixed martial arts in Ontario
