= Prospect Fighting Championships =

Canadian MMA promotion from Ontario, Canada

- Logo of the PFC
- Sport: Combat Sports promotion
- Founded: 2013; 13 years ago
- Founder: Jamie Champion
- Owner: Private
- Country: Canada
- Headquarters: London, Ontario
- Website: www.prospectfc.ca

Prospect Fighting Championships or PFC is a Canadian combat sports promotion based in London, Ontario, Canada. Established in 2013, it is the oldest active promotion in the province. It was formerly known as the Provincial Fighting Championship (Provincial FC) before re-branding in 2015. PFC is one of the largest MMA promotions in Canada, thus it has provided talent to the UFC as a feeder organization. In 2023, the promotion signed a deal with Fite TV to stream events on their broadcast service.

== History ==
Founded in 2013, by Jamie Champion, the Provincial Fighting Championship held three professional events in the province of Ontario, before re-branding to Prospect Fighting Championships (PFC) in 2015. It started off by running amateur (PAFC) events in Ontario's blossoming MMA scene, as Mixed Martial Arts were considered illegal until 2010. Prior to 2010, the province’s only mixed martial arts events were held exclusively on native reservations, which operated outside provincial athletic regulations and therefore provided the sole venues where promoters could legally stage MMA competitions. These communities possess their own athletic commissions, so they were able to bypass provincial law. The Prospect Fighting Championships uses a Hexagon as their cage and adheres to the Unified Rules of Mixed Martial Arts. The promotion has hosted both professional and amateur contests, and offers a wide variety of weight classes to its athletes - ranging from Atomweight to Super Heavyweight. This grants fighters of all weights the chance to compete and improve their skills.

Over time, the commentary team for the PFC has seen many changes. Currently it is led by 8-fight PFC veteran, Gino Ghalehpardaz and play-by-play analyst John Ethier. In the past, it was led by John Ramdeen, a veteran broadcaster in Canada's mixed martial arts community. Other names include former mixed martial arts fighter, Robin Black, who has acted as the promotions lead analyst, and Reed Duthie, the PFC's former play-by-play analyst. Following PFC 18, the ring announcer for the Prospect Fighting Championships was announced to be David Neiman. In the past, other PFC announcers included the likes of veterans like Keith Crawford and Pete "Mr. Throwdown" Treviño, who both formerly acted as official announcers for the promotion prior to 2023.

Past guest commentators include MMA veterans, Chris Horodecki, Sam Stout and Jesse Ronson. The organization has also hosted three WAKO sanctioned kickboxing events and one MTO sanctioned Muay Thai event. Over the last decade, the PFC has established itself as a premiere organization in Ontario, and has grown into one of the largest promotions in Canada. Since its inception, the promotion has held 27 events, involving 235 MMA matches, and 40 kickboxing or Muay Thai bouts.

=== Provincial Fighting Championship ===
On Saturday, October 26, 2013. Provincial Fighting Championship held their inaugural event in London, Ontario, Canada. The promotion ran four events under the Provincial FC banner, before re-branding to Prospect Fighting Championships in 2015.

=== Events ===
#	Event Title	Date	Location
4	Provincial Fighting Championship 4	April 15, 2015 (cancelled)	Windsor, Ontario, CAN
3	Provincial Fighting Championship 3: Showdown In The Downtown	October 18, 2014	London, Ontario, CAN
2	Provincial Fighting Championship 2	March 8, 2014	London, Ontario, CAN
1	Provincial Fighting Championship 1: Unrivaled	October 26, 2013	London, Ontario, CAN

=== Prospect Fighting Championships ===
On Saturday, August 29, 2015. Prospect Fighting Championships held its first event in London, Ontario, Canada. The organization hosted six AMMA events and three WAKO sanctioned kickboxing events before switching back to the professional MMA circuit. Since the re-brand, it has held 24 events, all in Ontario. The promotion continues the use of a hexagonal cage and operates under the Unified Rules of Mixed Martial Arts. The PFC commentary team is hosted by Gino Ghalehpardaz and former grappling competitor, John Ethier. David Neiman acts as the official announcer for the Prospect Fighting Championships.

The company also holds annual events in conjunction with London-based fundraiser, Showdown in the Downtown, to support fundraising to "fight" kidney disease. In 2020, the promotion signed a deal with Fight Network streaming services. With the COVID-19 lock-down in Ontario preventing live shows in late 2020–2021, the promotion and it's partners hosted a virtual talk show on September 25, 2021. It featured former UFC fighter Brendan Schaub, the event resulted in over $300,000 being raised for local charities. In total the events have raised an accumulative 3 million dollars for charity.

=== Events ===
#	Event Title	Date	Location
26	Prospect Fighting Championships 26: Knockout Kidney Disease 5	September 26, 2026	London, Ontario, CAN
25	Prospect Fighting Championships 25: White vs. Dusek	August 15, 2026	Sarnia, Ontario, CAN
24	Prospect Fighting Championships 24: Appel vs. Jere	July 18, 2026	Caledonia, Ontario, CAN
23	Prospect Fighting Championships 23: Appel vs. Anaya	May 9, 2026	Niagara-on-the-Lake, Ontario, CAN
22	Prospect Fighting Championships 22: White vs. Melo	April 25, 2026	Sarnia, Ontario, CAN
21	Prospect Fighting Championships 21: North vs. Pocchi	February 28, 2026	London, Ontario, CAN
20	Prospect Fighting Championships 20: Fightmare At 100 Kellogg's Lane	October 25, 2025	London, Ontario, CAN
19	Prospect Fighting Championships 19: Novice Edition	July 19, 2025	London, Ontario, CAN
18	Prospect Fighting Championships 18: Knockout Kidney Disease 4	December 15, 2023	London, Ontario, CAN
17	Prospect Fighting Championships 17	October 15, 2023 (cancelled)	Toronto, Ontario, CAN
16	Prospect Fighting Championships 16: Mein vs. Chavez	April 23, 2023	Toronto, Ontario, CAN
15	Prospect Fighting Championships 15: Imperato vs. Toliver	March 5, 2023	Toronto, Ontario, CAN
14	Prospect Fighting Championships 14: Knockout Kidney Disease 3	October 22, 2022	London, Ontario, CAN
13	Prospect Fighting Championships 13: Unfinished Business	March 8, 2020	Toronto, Ontario, CAN
12	Prospect Fighting Championships 12: Laramie vs. Cruz	December 6, 2019	Windsor, Ontario, CAN
11	Prospect Fighting Championships 11: Knockout Kidney Disease 2	September 28, 2019	London, Ontario, CAN
10	Prospect Fighting Championships 10	June 15, 2019	Windsor, Ontario, CAN
9	Prospect Fighting Championships 9	July 14, 2018	London, Ontario, CAN
8	Prospect Fighting Championships 8	February 17, 2018	London, Ontario, CAN
7	Prospect Fighting Championships 7: Knockout Kidney Disease	October 7, 2017	London, Ontario, CAN
6	Prospect Fighting Championships 6: Paddy Whacked	March 18, 2017	London, Ontario, CAN
5	Prospect Fighting Championships 5: Deck The Halls With Beers And Brawls	December 4, 2016	London, Ontario, CAN
4	Prospect Fighting Championships 4	August 13, 2016	London, Ontario, CAN
3	Prospect Fighting Championships 3	March 5, 2016	London, Ontario, CAN
2	Prospect Fighting Championships 2	December 8, 2015	London, Ontario, CAN
1	Prospect Fighting Championships 1	August 29, 2015	London, Ontario, CAN

== Events ==
=== Scheduled events ===
#	Event	Date	Venue	Location
3	Prospect Fighting Championships 27	TBA October 2026	TBA	TBA Ontario, CAN
2	Prospect Fighting Championships 26: Knockout Kidney Disease 5	September 26, 2026	RBC Place	London, Ontario, CAN
1	Prospect Fighting Championships 25: White vs. Dusek	August 15, 2026	Lambton College	Sarnia, Ontario, CAN

=== Past events ===
#	Event	Date	Number of bouts	Location
28	Prospect Fighting Championships 24: Appel vs. Jere	July 18, 2026	11	Caledonia, Ontario, CAN
27	Prospect Fighting Championships 23: Appel vs. Anaya	May 9, 2026	12	Niagara-on-the-Lake, Ontario, CAN
26	Prospect Fighting Championships 22: White vs. Melo	April 25, 2026	13	Sarnia, Ontario, CAN
25	Prospect Fighting Championships 21: North vs. Pocchi	February 28, 2026	13	London, Ontario, CAN
24	Prospect Fighting Championships 20: Fightmare At 100 Kellogg's Lane	October 25, 2025	11	London, Ontario, CAN
23	Prospect Fighting Championships 19: Novice Edition	July 19, 2025	12	London, Ontario, CAN
22	Prospect Fighting Championships 18: Knockout Kidney Disease 4	December 15, 2023	Muay Thai event	London, Ontario, CAN
21	Prospect Fighting Championships 17	October 15, 2023	Event cancelled	Toronto, Ontario, CAN
20	Prospect Fighting Championships 16: Mein vs. Chavez	April 23, 2023	12	Toronto, Ontario, CAN
19	Prospect Fighting Championships 15: Imperato vs. Toliver	March 5, 2023	6	Toronto, Ontario, CAN
18	Prospect Fighting Championships 14: Knockout Kidney Disease 3	October 22, 2022	9	London, Ontario, CAN
17	Prospect Fighting Championships 13: Unfinished Business 2	March 8, 2020	9	Toronto, Ontario, CAN
16	Prospect Fighting Championships 12: Laramie vs. Cruz	December 6, 2019	9	Windsor, Ontario, CAN
15	Prospect Fighting Championships 11: Knockout Kidney Disease 2	September 28, 2019	10	London, Ontario, CAN
14	Prospect Fighting Championships 10	June 15, 2019	11	Windsor, Ontario, CAN
13	Prospect Fighting Championships 9	July 14, 2018	Amateur kickboxing event	London, Ontario, CAN
12	Prospect Fighting Championships 8: Unfinished Business	February 17, 2018	Amateur kickboxing event	London, Ontario, CAN
11	Prospect Fighting Championships 7: Knockout Kidney Disease	October 7, 2017	Amateur kickboxing event	London, Ontario, CAN
10	Prospect Fighting Championships 6: Paddy Whacked	March 18, 2017	15	London, Ontario, CAN
9	Prospect Fighting Championships 5: Deck The Halls With Beers And Brawls	December 4, 2016	13	London, Ontario, CAN
8	Prospect Fighting Championships 4	August 13, 2016	14	London, Ontario, CAN
7	Prospect Fighting Championships 3	March 5, 2016	10	London, Ontario, CAN
6	Prospect Fighting Championships 2	December 8, 2015	9	London, Ontario, CAN
5	Prospect Fighting Championships 1	August 29, 2015	7	London, Ontario, CAN
4	Provincial Fighting Championship 4	April 15, 2015	Event cancelled	Windsor, Ontario, CAN
3	Provincial Fighting Championship 3: Showdown In The Downtown	October 18, 2014	10	London, Ontario, CAN
2	Provincial Fighting Championship 2	March 8, 2014	9	London, Ontario, CAN
1	Provincial Fighting Championship 1: Unrivaled	October 26, 2013	10	London, Ontario, CAN

== Champions ==
=== Professional Champions ===
Division	Upper weight limit	Champion	Since	Title Defenses
Super Heavyweight	266 lbs - Unlimited	Vacant		
Heavyweight	265 lb (120 kg)	Vacant		
Light Heavyweight	205 lb (93 kg)	Vacant		
Middleweight	185 lb (84 kg)	Vacant		
Welterweight	170 lb (77 kg)	Vacant		
Lightweight	155 lb (70 kg)	Vacant		
Featherweight	145 lb (66 kg)	(Canada) T.J. Laramie	Dec 6, 2019 (PFC 12)	Vacated to sign with the UFC
Bantamweight	135 lb (61 kg)	Vacant		
Flyweight	125 lb (57 kg)	(Canada) Tony Laramie	March 8, 2020 (PFC 13)	Vacated to sign with Rizin Fighting Federation
Women's Lightweight	155 lb (70 kg)	Vacant		
Women's Featherweight	145 lb (66 kg)	Vacant		
Women's Bantamweight	135 lb (61 kg)	Vacant		
Women's Flyweight	125 lb (57 kg)	Vacant		
Women's Strawweight	115 lb (52 kg)	(Canada) Randa Markos	August 13, 2016 (Provincial FC 2)	Vacated to sign with the UFC
Atomweight	105 lb (48 kg)	Vacant		

=== Amateur Champions ===
Division	Upper weight limit	Champion	Since	Title Defenses
Super Heavyweight	266 lb - Unlimited	(United States) Lawrence Bonds	August 13, 2016 (PFC 4)	N/A
Heavyweight	265 lb (120 kg)	(Canada) Leeroy Johnson	March 18, 2017 (PFC 6)	N/A
Cruiserweight	225 lb (102 kg)	Vacant		
Light Heavyweight	205 lb (93 kg)	(Canada) Tyler Kerr	August 13, 2016 (PFC 4)	N/A
Middleweight	185 lb (84 kg)	(Canada) Sean Meade	December 4, 2016 (PFC 5)	N/A
Welterweight	170 lb (77 kg)	(Canada) Aiden Appel	February 28, 2026 (PFC 21)	Two defenses
Lightweight	155 lb (70 kg)	(Bhutan) Tsheltrim Rabgyel	July 18, 2026 (PFC 24)	N/A
Featherweight	145 lb (66 kg)	(Canada) Samir Ahmad	May 09, 2026 (PFC 23)	One defense
Bantamweight	135 lb (61 kg)	(Canada) Lenny White	April 25, 2026 (PFC 22)	N/A
Flyweight	125 lb (57 kg)	Vacant		
Women's Lightweight	155 lb (70 kg)	Vacant		
Women's Featherweight	145 lb (66 kg)	(Canada) Jo Duarte	May 09, 2026 (PFC 23)	N/A
Women's Bantamweight	135 lb (61 kg)	Vacant		
Women's Flyweight	125 lb (57 kg)	Vacant		
Women's Strawweight	115 lb (52 kg)	(Canada) Anniestasia Nikolakakos	August 13, 2016 (PFC 4)	N/A
Atomweight	105 lb (48 kg)	Vacant		

=== Kickboxing Champions ===
Division	Upper weight limit	Champion	Since	Title Defenses
Light Heavyweight	205 lb (93 kg)	(Canada) Gordon Cunningham	July 14, 2018 (PFC 9)	N/A
Featherweight	145 lb (66 kg)	(Canada) Amro Al Falastini	February 17, 2018 (PFC 8)	N/A

== Championship history ==
=== Pro Featherweight Championship ===
Weight limit: 145 lb (65.8 kg)

No.	Name	Event	Date	Defenses
1	(Canada) T.J. Laramie def. Andrew Cruz	Prospect Fighting Championships 12: Laramie vs. Cruz; Windsor, Ontario, Canada	Dec 6, 2019	
Laramie vacated to compete for the UFC.

=== Pro Flyweight Championship ===
Weight limit: 125 lb (56.7 kg)

No.	Name	Event	Date	Defenses
1	(Canada) Tony Laramie def. Claudio Ledesma	Prospect Fighting Championships 13: Unfinished Business; Toronto, Ontario, Canada	Mar 8, 2020	
Laramie vacated to compete for the LFA.

=== Pro Women's Strawweight Championship ===
52 kg (115 lb)

No.	Name	Event	Date	Defenses
1	(Canada) Randa Markos def. Lynnell House	Provincial Fighting Championship 2 London, Ontario, Canada	March 08, 2014	
Markos vacated to compete on TUF 20 & later signed with the UFC.

=== Amateur Super Heavyweight Championship ===
121 kg+ (266 lb+)

No.	Name	Event	Date	Defenses
1	(United States) Lawrence Bonds def. Jeff Fuchs	Prospect Fighting Championships 4: Black Ties & Black Eyes; London, Ontario, Canada	August 13, 2016	N/A

=== Amateur Heavyweight Championship ===
120 kg (265 lb)

No.	Name	Event	Date	Defenses
1	(Canada) Garth Watkins def. Scott Lamont	Prospect Fighting Championships 2 London, Ontario, Canada	December 08, 2015	N/A
2	(Canada) Leeroy Johnson def. Scott Lamont	Prospect Fighting Championships 6: Paddy Whacked; London, Ontario, Canada	March 18, 2017	N/A

=== Amateur Cruiserweight Championship ===
102 kg (225 lb)

No.	Name	Event	Date	Defenses
1	Vacant			

=== Amateur Light Heavyweight Championship ===
92 kg (205 lb)

No.	Name	Event	Date	Defenses
1	(Canada) Adam Webber def. Adrian Brown	Prospect Fighting Championships 3 London, Ontario, Canada	March 05, 2016	N/A
2	(Canada) Tyler Kerr def. Nathan Grotenhuis	Prospect Fighting Championships 4: Black Ties & Black Eyes; London, Ontario, Canada	August 13, 2016	N/A

=== Amateur Middleweight Championship ===
84 kg (185 lb)

No.	Name	Event	Date	Defenses
1	(Canada) Tobin Cornelius def. Michael Guermoudi	Prospect Fighting Championships 4: Black Ties & Black Eyes; London, Ontario, Canada	August 13, 2016	N/A
2	(Canada) Sean Meade def. Marc Solomon	Prospect Fighting Championships 5: Deck The Halls With Beers And Brawls; London, Ontario, Canada	December 04, 2016	N/A

=== Amateur Welterweight Championship ===
77 kg (170 lb)

No.	Name	Event	Date	Defenses
1	(Canada) Aiden Appel def. Hudson Adair	Prospect Fighting Championships 21: North vs. Pocchi; London, Ontario, Canada	February 28, 2026	1. def. Sergio Anaya at PFC 23 on May 9, 2026; 2. def. Chandi Jere at PFC 24 on July 18, 2026

=== Amateur Lightweight Championship ===
70 kg (155 lb)

No.	Name	Event	Date	Defenses
1	(Canada) Adam Webber def. Aaron Thompson	Prospect Fighting Championships 2 London, Ontario, Canada	December 08, 2015	Vacated to move up in weight
2	(Bhutan) Tsheltrim Rabgyel def. Uros Bozic	PFC 24: Appel vs. Jere; Caledonia, Ontario, Canada	July 18, 2026	N/A

=== Amateur Featherweight Championship ===
66 kg (145 lb)

No.	Name	Event	Date	Defenses
1	(United States) Kyle Brockitt def. Shane Monaghan	Prospect Fighting Championships 3 London, Ontario, Canada	March 5, 2016	N/A
2	(Republic of Ireland) Shane Monaghan def. Seth Connor	Prospect Fighting Championships 6: Paddy Whacked; London, Ontario, Canada	March 18, 2017	N/A
3	(Canada) Gaetano Pocchi def. Liam North	Prospect Fighting Championships 21: North vs. Pocchi; London, Ontario, Canada	February 28, 2026	N/A
4	(Canada) Samir Ahmad def. Gaetano Pocchi	Prospect Fighting Championships 23: Appel vs. Anaya; Niagara-on-the-Lake, Ontario, Canada	May 09, 2026	1. def. Uros Bozic at PFC 24 on July 18, 2026

=== Amateur Bantamweight Championship ===
61 kg (135 lb)

No.	Name	Event	Date	Defenses
1	(Republic of Ireland) Shane Monaghan def. Nigel Crosswell	Prospect Fighting Championships 5: Deck The Halls With Beers And Brawls; London, Ontario, Canada	December 04, 2016	N/A
2	(Canada) Lenny White def. Shane Melo	Prospect Fighting Championships 22: White vs. Melo; Sarnia, Ontario, Canada	April 25, 2026	N/A

=== Amateur Flyweight Championship ===
57 kg (125 lb)

No.	Name	Event	Date	Defenses
1	Vacant			

=== Amateur Woman's Lightweight Championship ===
70 kg (155 lb)

No.	Name	Event	Date	Defenses
1	Vacant			

=== Amateur Woman's Featherweight Championship ===
65 kg (145 lb)

No.	Name	Event	Date	Defenses
1	(Canada) Jo Duarte def. Amanda Gans	Prospect Fighting Championships 23: Appel vs. Anaya; Niagara-on-the-Lake, Ontario, Canada	May 9, 2026	N/A

=== Amateur Woman's Bantamweight Championship ===
61 kg (135 lb)

No.	Name	Event	Date	Defenses
1	Vacant			

=== Amateur Woman's Straw-weight Championship ===
52 kg (115 lb)

No.	Name	Event	Date	Defenses
1	(Canada) Anniestasia Nikolakakos def. Natia Biason	Prospect Fighting Championships 4: Black Ties & Black Eyes; London, Ontario, Canada	August 13, 2016	N/A

=== Amateur Atomweight Championship ===
48 kg (105 lb)

No.	Name	Event	Date	Defenses
1	Vacant			

=== Light Heavyweight Kickboxing Championship ===
92 kg (205 lb)

No.	Name	Event	Date	Defenses
1	(Canada) Gordon Cunningham def. Jeremy Fuchs	Prospect Fighting Championships 9 London, Ontario, Canada	July 14, 2018	N/A

=== Featherweight Kickboxing Championship ===
57 kg (145 lb)

No.	Name	Event	Date	Defenses
1	(Canada) Amro Al Falastini def. Matty Del Cul-Hovorka	Prospect Fighting Championships 8: Unfinished Business; London, Ontario, Canada	February 17, 2018	N/A

== Promotional records ==
=== Most Fights in the PFC ===
*All fighters that have fought for the PFC will be included

	Fighter	Division/s	Fights
1.	(Canada) Scott Lamont	Heavyweight	8
1.	(Canada) Gino Ghalehpardaz	Featherweight; Catchweight	8

=== Most Wins in PFC ===
*All fighters that have fought for the PFC will be included

	Fighter	Division/s	Victories
1.	(Canada) Kyle Prepolec	Lightweight; Welterweight; Catchweight	5
1.	(Canada) Gino Ghalehpardaz	Featherweight; Catchweight	5

=== Most Knockouts in PFC ===
*All fighters that have fought for the PFC will be included

	Fighter	Division/s	Knockouts
1.	(Canada) Kyle Prepolec	Lightweight; Welterweight; Catchweight	3
1.	(Canada) Tony Laramie	Flyweight; Catchweight	3

=== Most Decisions in PFC ===
*All fighters that have fought for the PFC will be included

	Fighter	Division/s	Decisions
1.	(Canada) Gino Ghalehpardaz	Featherweight; Catchweight	4

=== Longest Win-streak in PFC ===
*All fighters that have fought for the PFC will be included

	Fighter	Division/s	Decisions
1.	(Canada) Kyle Prepolec	Lightweight; Welterweight; Catchweight	5

=== Fastest Knockout in the PFC ===
*All fighters that have fought for the PFC will be included

	Fighter	Opponent	Time (Round 1)	Method
1.	(Canada) Avinash Chowtee	Ryan Dunphy	0:09	KO (Punch)
2.	(Canada) Granit Mijalica	Nasim Abdulrahimzai	0:13	KO (Punch)
3.	(Canada) Esteban Alva	Cody Koesdibyo	0:16	KO (Punches)

=== Fastest Submission in the PFC ===
*All fighters that have fought for the PFC will be included

	Fighter	Opponent	Time (Round 1)	Method
1.	(Canada) Chad Hunt & Abhi Chadha (Tied)	Jay Kielec & Shane Barker	0:37	Rear-naked Choke & Triangle Choke
2.	(Canada) Luke Hogg	Jeff Wall	0:38	Guillotine Choke
3.	(Canada) Justin Ritchie	Luke Hogg	0:42	Armbar

=== Most Finishes in PFC ===
*All fighters that have fought for the PFC will be included

	Fighter	Division/s	Finishes
1.	(Canada) Kyle Prepolec	Lightweight; Welterweight; Catchweight	4
1.	(Canada) Matt Dawson	Bantamweight; Flyweight	4

=== Longest Win-streak in PFC ===
*All fighters that have fought for the PFC will be included

	Fighter	Division/s	Win-streak
1.	(Canada) Kyle Prepolec	Lightweight; Welterweight; Catchweight	5

=== Heaviest Fighter in PFC History ===
*All fighters that have fought for the PFC will be included

	Fighter	Division/s	Weight
1.	(United States) Lawrence Bonds	Super Heavyweight	303 LBS

=== Lightest Fighter in PFC History ===
*All fighters that have fought for the PFC will be included

	Fighter	Division/s	Weight
1.	(Canada) Jill Ritchie	Atomweight; Catchweight	103.8 LBS

=== Tallest Fighter in PFC History ===
*All fighters that have fought for the PFC will be included

	Fighter	Division/s	Height
1.	(Canada) Bryan Jordan	Heavyweight	6' 8"
1.	(Estonia) Mark Taks	Heavyweight	6' 8"

=== Shortest Fighter in PFC History ===
*All fighters that have fought for the PFC will be included

	Fighter	Division/s	Win-streak
1.	(United States) Amanda Lovato	Atomweight	5' 0"

=== PFC Event with most Finishes ===
*All PFC events will be included

	Event	Date	Bouts	Finishes
1.	Prospect Fighting Championships 6	March 18, 2017	15	11

=== PFC Event with Highest Finish Percentage ===
*All PFC events will be included

	Event	Date	Bouts	Finishes
1.	Prospect Fighting Championships 10	June 15, 2019; October 25, 2025	11	10 (90.91%)
1.	Prospect Fighting Championships 20	June 15, 2019; October 25, 2025	11	10 (90.91%)

== Notable alumni ==
(Canada) Chris Horodecki
(Canada) Jesse Ronson
(Canada) Misha Cirkunov
(Canada) Randa Markos
(Canada) Kyle Prepolec
(Canada) Malcolm Gordon
(Canada) Kyle Nelson
(United States) Justin Jaynes
(Canada) Alex Ricci
(Canada) Elias Theodorou
(Brazil) Hernani Perpetuo
(Canada) T.J. Laramie
(United States) Ryan Healy
(United States) Claudio Ledesma
(Canada) Tony Laramie
(Canada) Jordan Mein
(Canada) Serhiy Sidey
(Canada) Cody Chovancek
(Canada) James Mancini
