= Hernani Perpetuo =

Brazilian mixed martial artist

- Born: Hernani Perpetuo Cunha; May 24, 1985 (age 41); Rio de Janeiro, Brazil
- Nationality: (Brazil) Brazilian
- Height: 6 ft 0 in (1.83 m)
- Weight: 170 lb (77 kg; 12 st)
- Division: Welterweight
- Reach: 74.0 in (188 cm)
- Fighting out of: Rio de Janeiro, Brazil
- Team: Nova União
- Years active: 2005-present

Mixed martial arts record
- Total: 31
- Wins: 21
- By knockout: 10
- By submission: 5
- By decision: 6
- Losses: 9
- By knockout: 2
- By submission: 1
- By decision: 6
- No contests: 1

Other information
- Mixed martial arts record from Sherdog

Hernani Perpetuo Cunha (born May 24, 1985) is a Brazilian mixed martial artist who competes in Shooto Brasil in the welterweight division. He is a former Shooto Welterweight Champion. (Note: The Shooto Welterweight Championship was known as the Shooto Middleweight Championship prior to January 1, 2017.) A professional mixed martial artist since 2005, Perpetuo has also competed in the Ultimate Fighting Championship (UFC) and ONE Championship.

== Mixed martial arts career ==
=== Early career ===
Perpetuo started his professional MMA career in 2005 and mainly fought in Brazil, most notably Shooto Brasil. He amassed a record of 17–3 prior to being signed by the UFC.

Perpetuo faced Tommy Depret for the Shooto Middleweight Championship on August 25, 2013, at Shooto Brasil 42. He won the bout by unanimous decision.

=== Ultimate Fighting Championship ===
Perpetuo made his UFC debut replacing Santiago Ponzinibbio against Jordan Mein on April 19, 2014, at UFC on Fox 11. He lost the bout via split decision.

Perpetuo faced Tim Means on July 26, 2014, at UFC on Fox 12. He lost the bout by unanimous decision and was released by the promotion on October 19, 2015.

=== Post-UFC career ===
Perpetuo made his return to Shooto Brasil on July 31, 2016, at Shooto Brasil 65 against Cleber Souza. He won the bout by first-round technical knockout.

Perpetuo faced Raimundo Chaves on May 11, 2018, at Shooto Brasil 83. He won the bout by TKO in the first round.

Perpetuo face Marcão Santana on December 9, 2018, at Shooto Brasil 89. He won the bout by submission in the first round.

In his ONE Championship debut, Perpetuo faced Hiroyuki Tetsuka at ONE Championship: Century Part 2 on October 13, 2019. He lost the bout by unanimous decision.

Perpetuo faced Elias Theodorou at Prospect Fighting Championships 12 on December 6, 2019. He lost the fight in the third round via TKO.

Perpetuo faced Yukinari Tamura on November 23, 2023, at Shooto Brasil 120. He defended the welterweight title by TKO in the first round.

Perpetuo relinquished the Shooto Welterweight title on November 3, 2025 due to injury, ending his reign as the title's longest-reigning holder. As a result, Ryuichiro Sumimura, who had been interim champion since July, was promoted to undisputed champion.

== Championships and accomplishments ==
=== Mixed martial arts ===
- Shooto
  - Shooto Welterweight Championship (One time)

== Mixed martial arts record ==
Professional record breakdown
31 matches	21 wins	9 losses
By knockout	10	2
By submission	5	1
By decision	6	6
No contests	1	

Res.	Record	Opponent	Method	Event	Date	Round	Time	Location	Notes
Win	21–9 (1)	Yukinari Tamura	TKO (upkick and punches)	Shooto Brasil 120	November 24, 2023	1	1:30	Rio de Janeiro, Brazil	Defended the Shooto Welterweight Championship.
Loss	20–9 (1)	Elias Theodorou	TKO (elbows)	PFC 12: Laramie vs. Cruz	December 6, 2019	3	1:51	Windsor, Ontario, Canada	
Loss	20–8 (1)	Hiroyuki Tetsuka	Decision (unanimous)	ONE: Century – Part 2	October 13, 2019	3	5:00	Tokyo, Japan	
Win	20–7 (1)	Marcão Santana	Submission (choke)	Shooto Brasil 89	December 9, 2018	1	2:05	Rio de Janeiro, Brazil	
Loss	19–7 (1)	Vitaliy Slipenko	Decision (unanimous)	League S - 70 - Plotforma Cup 2018	August 22, 2018	3	5:00	Sochi, Russia	
Win	19–6 (1)	Raimundo Chaves	TKO (punches)	Shooto Brasil 83	May 11, 2018	1	4:35	Rio de Janeiro, Brazil	
Loss	18–6 (1)	Aigun Akhmedov	Decision (unanimous)	Fight Nights Global 82	December 16, 2017	3	5:00	Moscow, Russia	
Win	18–5 (1)	Cleber Souza	TKO (punches)	Shooto Brasil 65	July 31, 2016	1	1:33	Rio de Janeiro, Brazil	
Loss	17–5 (1)	Tim Means	Decision (unanimous)	UFC on Fox: Lawler vs. Brown	July 26, 2014	3	5:00	San Jose, California, United States	
Loss	17–4 (1)	Jordan Mein	Decision (split)	UFC on Fox: Werdum vs. Browne	April 19, 2014	3	5:00	Orlando, Florida, United States	
Win	17–3	Tommy Depret	Decision (unanimous)	Shooto Brasil 42	August 25, 2013	5	5:00	Rio de Janeiro, Brazil	Won Shooto Welterweight Championship.
Win	16–3 (1)	Sergio Souza	Decision (unanimous)	Web Fight Combat 2	July 7, 2013	2	0:00	Rio de Janeiro, Brazil	
Win	15–3 (1)	André Santos	Decision (unanimous)	Web Fight Combat 1	January 27, 2013	3	5:00	Rio de Janeiro, Brazil	
Win	14–3 (1)	Elder Lara	TKO (punches)	Watch Out Combat Show 23	December 1, 2012	1	5:00	Rio de Janeiro, Brazil	
Win	13–3 (1)	Edgar Sedovia	Submission (armlock)	Shooto Brasil 29	April 26, 2012	1	1:46	Rio de Janeiro, Brazil	
Win	12–3 (1)	Edilberto de Oliveira	Decision (split)	Shooto Brasil 10	July 20, 2011	3	5:00	Rio de Janeiro, Brazil	
Win	11–3 (1)	Daniel Acácio	Decision (split)	Max Fight 5	July 20, 2011	3	5:00	Campinas, São Paulo, Brazil	
NC	10–3 (1)	Marcão Santana	NC (accidental headbutt)	Shooto Brasil 22	April 1, 2011	1	5:00	Brasília, Brazil	
Win	10–3	Romario da Silva	Decision (unanimous)	Shooto Brasil 19	October 17, 2010	3	5:00	Rio de Janeiro, Brazil	
Loss	9–3	Romario da Silva	Submission (armbar)	Shooto Brasil 17	August 6, 2010	1	4:47	Rio de Janeiro, Brazil	
Win	9–2	Alexsander Andreotte	Decision (unanimous)	Shooto Brasil 16	June 12, 2010	1	3:30	Rio de Janeiro, Brazil	
Loss	8–2	Bastiaan Rejen	TKO (leg injury)	Shooto Brasil 13	August 27, 2009	2	3:57	Rio de Janeiro, Brazil	
Win	8–1	Wendell Oliveira	TKO (punches)	Watch Out Combat Show 4	June 25, 2009	1	0:00	Rio de Janeiro, Brazil	
Win	7–1	Fabiano Tales	Submission (anaconda choke)	Shooto Brasil 11	March 28, 2009	1	4:50	Rio de Janeiro, Brazil	
Loss	6–1	Igor Fernandes	Decision (unanimous)	Shooto: Brasil 9	November 29, 2008	3	5:00	Fortaleza, Brazil	
Win	6–0	Alan Caster	TKO (punches)	Rocinha Fight	August 2, 2008	2	0:00	Rio de Janeiro, Brazil	
Win	5–0	José Carlos da Silva	Submission (rear-naked choke)	Shooto Brasil 7	June 28, 2008	1	1:25	Rio de Janeiro, Brazil	
Win	4–0	Mario Schembri	Decision (unanimous)	Shooto Brasil 5	January 26, 2008	2	N/A	Rio de Janeiro, Brazil	
Win	3–0	Taedes Mendonça	KO (head kick)	Shooto Brasil 4	October 27, 2007	1	1:50	Rio de Janeiro, Brazil	
Win	2–0	Erivan Gonçalves	Decision	IF 1	May 27, 2006	N/A	N/A	Volta Redonda, Brazil	
Win	1–0	Rogerio Ferreira Furtado	KO	Campeonato Brasileiro de Vale-Tudo	November 5, 2005	1	1:00	Santo André, Brazil	
