= Jordan Mein =

Canadian mixed martial arts fighter

- Born: October 10, 1989 (age 37); Lethbridge, Alberta, Canada
- Other names: Young Gun
- Height: 6 ft 0 in (1.83 m)
- Weight: 170 lb (77 kg; 12 st)
- Division: Welterweight
- Reach: 73 in (190 cm)
- Fighting out of: Lethbridge, Alberta, Canada
- Team: Canadian Martial Arts Centre
- Trainer: Lee Mein
- Years active: 2006–present

Mixed martial arts record
- Total: 49
- Wins: 34
- By knockout: 16
- By submission: 9
- By decision: 9
- Losses: 15
- By knockout: 5
- By submission: 4
- By decision: 6

Amateur record
- Total: 7
- Wins: 6
- Losses: 1

Other information
- Website: http://www.jordanmein.ca/
- Mixed martial arts record from Sherdog

Jordan Mein (born October 10, 1989) is a Canadian professional mixed martial artist who currently competes in the Welterweight division. A professional competitor since 2006, Mein has also formerly competed for Ultimate Fighting Championship, Bellator MMA, Strikeforce and King of the Cage.

== Background ==
Mein's father, Lee Mein, began operating a local promotion called Rumble in the Cage. It gave Mein, who had been training since the age of four, his first fighting opportunity and when he was just 11 years old he fought another local boy in a kickboxing match. That fight helped start Mein's fighting career that has included kickboxing tournaments, Brazilian jiu-jitsu competitions, at both the amateur and professional level.

== Mixed martial arts career ==
=== Early career ===
Jordan's first amateur fight came when he was 14, and he compiled a 6–0–1 record before turning professional. He turned professional at the age of 16 in June 2006 at one of his father's Rumble in the Cage shows.

Jordan defeated Joe Riggs via second round KO at Wreck MMA: Strong and Proud on January 28, 2011.

He fought UFC veteran Josh Burkman at MMA 1: The Reckoning on April 2, 2011. He won via unanimous decision.

=== Strikeforce ===
Mein signed a four-fight deal with Strikeforce in July 2011 and made his promotional debut at Strikeforce World Grand Prix: Barnett vs. Kharitonov, defeating Evangelista Santos via TKO in the third round.

Mein fought Tyron Woodley at Strikeforce: Rockhold vs. Jardine. He lost a split decision (28-29, 29-28, 30-27).

Mein defeated Tyler Stinson at Strikeforce: Rockhold vs. Kennedy via unanimous decision.

=== Score Fighting Series ===
Jordan fought Dream Welterweight Champion, Marius Žaromskis at Score Fighting Series 1 on June 10, 2011 Winning via unanimous decision.

Mein fought Forrest Petz in the main event of the Score Fighting Series 7 on November 23, 2012. He won via TKO early in the first round.

=== Ultimate Fighting Championship ===
Mein made his UFC promotional against Dan Miller on March 16, 2013 at UFC 158. He won the fight via TKO in the first round.

Mein made a quick return to the Octagon as he faced Matt Brown on April 20, 2013 at UFC on Fox 7, replacing an injured Dan Hardy. He lost the fight via TKO in the second round, after a Brown knee fractured his nasal and orbital bones. Despite the loss, the back-and-forth bout earned him his first Fight of the Night bonus award.

Mein was expected to face Santiago Ponzinibbio on April 19, 2014 at UFC on Fox 11. However, Ponzinibbio was removed from the bout and was replaced by Hernani Perpetuo. He won the fight via split decision.

Mein was expected to face Thiago Alves on August 23, 2014 at UFC Fight Night 49. However, Alves pulled out of the bout citing a knee injury and was replaced by Brandon Thatch. Subsequently, Thatch also pulled out of the bout with Mein citing a toe injury. Mein would instead face Mike Pyle after Pyle's scheduled opponent at the event, Demian Maia, also pulled out with an injury. He won the fight via first round TKO. The win also earned Mein his first Performance of the Night bonus award.

The bout with Alves eventually took place on January 31, 2015 at UFC 183. Despite dominating the first round on the feet, Mein lost the fight via TKO in the second round after Alves landed a kick to the body.

In August 2015, Mein announced that he had retired from MMA competition. In September 2016 Mein was tested by the United States Anti-Doping Agency as part of the UFC anti-doping program suggesting a return to competition.

Returning from his nearly two-year sabbatical, Mein faced promotional newcomer Emil Weber Meek at UFC 206. He lost the fight via unanimous decision.

Mein faced Belal Muhammad on July 8, 2017 at UFC 213. He lost the fight by unanimous decision.

Mein faced Erick Silva on December 16, 2017 at UFC on Fox: Lawler vs. dos Anjos. He won the fight by unanimous decision.

As the last fight of his prevailing contract, Mein faced Alex Morono on July 28, 2018 at UFC on Fox 30. He won the fight by unanimous decision.

=== Post UFC ===
On January 7, 2020 it was reported that Mein was signed with Bellator MMA. He made his promotional debut against Jason Jackson at Bellator 242 on July 24, 2020. Mein lost the bout via unanimous decision.

After almost 3 years, Mein returned on April 23, 2023 at PFC 16: Mein vs. Chavez, defeating Ricardo Chavez via unanimous decision.

On December 11, 2024, it was announced that Mein had signed with Global Fight League. However, in April 2025, it was reported that all GFL events were cancelled indefinitely.

== Championships and accomplishments ==
- Ultimate Fighting Championship
  - Fight of the Night (One time)
  - Performance of the Night (One time)
- MMAJunkie.com
  - 2014 August Knockout of the Month vs. Mike Pyle

== Mixed martial arts record ==
Professional record breakdown
49 matches	34 wins	15 losses
By knockout	16	5
By submission	9	4
By decision	9	6

Res.	Record	Opponent	Method	Event	Date	Round	Time	Location	Notes
Loss	34–15	Dejan Kajić	TKO (punches)	Battlefield Fight League 87	May 7, 2026	1	3:46	Vancouver, British Columbia, Canada	Super Welterweight debut. For the BFL Super Welterweight Championship.
Win	34–14	Yohan Lainesse	Technical Submission (arm-triangle choke)	Unified MMA 67	February 28, 2026	1	1:30	Calgary, Alberta, Canada	
Win	33–14	Dany Mallette	Submission (guillotine choke)	Samourai MMA 13	March 7, 2025	2	2:26	Gatineau, Quebec, Canada	
Loss	32–14	Dilano Taylor	TKO (injury)	BTC 23	March 16, 2024	1	5:00	Kingston, Ontario, Canada	Middleweight debut.
Win	32–13	Ricardo Chávez Villaseñor	Decision (unanimous)	Prospect FC 16	April 23, 2023	3	5:00	Toronto, Ontario, Canada	
Loss	31–13	Jason Jackson	Decision (unanimous)	Bellator 242	July 24, 2020	3	5:00	Uncasville, Connecticut, United States	
Win	31–12	Alex Morono	Decision (unanimous)	UFC on Fox: Alvarez vs. Poirier 2	July 28, 2018	3	5:00	Calgary, Alberta, Canada	
Win	30–12	Erick Silva	Decision (unanimous)	UFC on Fox: Lawler vs. dos Anjos	December 16, 2017	3	5:00	Winnipeg, Manitoba, Canada	
Loss	29–12	Belal Muhammad	Decision (unanimous)	UFC 213	July 8, 2017	3	5:00	Las Vegas, Nevada, United States	
Loss	29–11	Emil Weber Meek	Decision (unanimous)	UFC 206	December 10, 2016	3	5:00	Toronto, Ontario, Canada	
Loss	29–10	Thiago Alves	KO (body kick)	UFC 183	January 31, 2015	2	0:39	Las Vegas, Nevada, United States	
Win	29–9	Mike Pyle	TKO (punches)	UFC Fight Night: Henderson vs. dos Anjos	August 23, 2014	1	1:12	Tulsa, Oklahoma, United States	Performance of the Night.
Win	28–9	Hernani Perpetuo	Decision (split)	UFC on Fox: Werdum vs. Browne	April 19, 2014	3	5:00	Orlando, Florida, United States	
Loss	27–9	Matt Brown	TKO (elbows)	UFC on Fox: Henderson vs. Melendez	April 20, 2013	2	1:00	San Jose, California, United States	Fight of the Night.
Win	27–8	Dan Miller	TKO (punches)	UFC 158	March 16, 2013	1	4:42	Montreal, Quebec, Canada	
Win	26–8	Forrest Petz	TKO (knees and elbows)	Score Fighting Series 7	November 23, 2012	1	1:29	Hamilton, Ontario, Canada	
Win	25–8	Tyler Stinson	Decision (unanimous)	Strikeforce: Rockhold vs. Kennedy	July 14, 2012	3	5:00	Portland, Oregon, United States	
Loss	24–8	Tyron Woodley	Decision (split)	Strikeforce: Rockhold vs. Jardine	January 7, 2012	3	5:00	Las Vegas, Nevada, United States	
Win	24–7	Evangelista Santos	TKO (elbows)	Strikeforce: Barnett vs. Kharitonov	September 10, 2011	3	3:18	Cincinnati, Ohio, United States	
Win	23–7	Marius Žaromskis	Decision (unanimous)	Score Fighting Series 1	June 10, 2011	3	5:00	Mississauga, Ontario, Canada	
Win	22–7	Joshua Burkman	Decision (unanimous)	Knockout Entertainment MMA: The Reckoning	April 2, 2011	3	5:00	Rama, Ontario, Canada	
Win	21–7	Keto Allen	Technical Submission (guillotine choke)	Rumble in the Cage 42	February 19, 2011	1	0:42	Lethbridge, Alberta, Canada	
Win	20–7	Joe Riggs	TKO (punches)	Wreck MMA: Strong and Proud	January 28, 2011	2	4:30	Gatineau, Quebec, Canada	Catchweight (184 lbs) bout.
Win	19–7	Chase Degenhardt	TKO (punches)	Rumble in the Cage 41	November 6, 2010	1	1:09	Lethbridge, Alberta, Canada	
Loss	18–7	Jason High	Decision (unanimous)	Rumble in the Cage 40	August 26, 2010	3	5:00	Taber, Alberta, Canada	
Win	18–6	George Belanger	TKO (punches)	Pure FC 5	July 24, 2010	1	2:55	Red Deer, Alberta, Canada	
Win	17–6	Victor Bachmann	Submission (neck crank)	Let's Get It On! MMA 1	April 23, 2010	1	4:21	Edmonton, Alberta, Canada	
Win	16–6	Andrew Buckland	TKO (punches)	Pure FC 4	March 12, 2010	1	N/A	Red Deer, Alberta, Canada	
Win	15–6	Tim Skidmore	TKO (punches)	Rumble in the Cage 38	January 23, 2010	1	0:42	Calgary, Alberta, Canada	
Loss	14–6	Mike Ricci	Decision (unanimous)	Ringside MMA 4	November 14, 2009	3	5:00	Drummondville, Quebec, Canada	
Win	14–5	Chad Freeman	TKO (punches)	Rumble in the Cage 34	April 11, 2009	1	2:20	Lethbridge, Alberta, Canada	
Win	13–5	Ryan Machan	Submission (kimura)	Pure FC 2	March 13, 2009	2	1:14	Red Deer, Alberta, Canada	
Win	12–5	Jeff Harrison	TKO (punches)	TKO 35	October 3, 2008	1	0:50	Montreal, Quebec, Canada	
Win	11–5	Justin Bermudez	TKO (doctor stoppage)	Vipers MMA: Venom at the Snakepit	August 29, 2008	1	0:42	Calgary, Alberta, Canada	
Win	10–5	Hollis Huggins	KO (head kick and punches)	Rumble in the Cage 30	June 28, 2008	1	0:20	Lethbridge, Alberta, Canada	
Loss	9–5	Samuel Guillet	Submission (kimura)	TKO 32	February 28, 2008	2	4:05	Montreal, Quebec, Canada	
Win	9–4	Dave Pariseau	Decision (unanimous)	Rumble in the Cage 27	December 31, 2007	3	5:00	Lethbridge, Alberta, Canada	
Win	8–4	Kevin Manderson	TKO (punches)	Ultimate Cage Wars 10	November 30, 2007	1	N/A	Winnipeg, Manitoba, Canada	
Win	7–4	Chris Ade	TKO (punches)	Extreme Fighting Challenge 5	November 3, 2007	1	1:25	Prince George, British Columbia, Canada	
Win	6–4	Adam Thomas	Submission (rear-naked choke)	Rumble in the Cage 26	October 27, 2007	1	2:24	Lethbridge, Alberta, Canada	
Win	5–4	Garret Vernoy	TKO (punches)	Ultimate Cage Wars 9	September 7, 2007	1	N/A	Winnipeg, Manitoba, Canada	
Loss	4–4	Gavin Hesson	TKO (punches)	Ultimate Cage Wars 8	June 23, 2007	2	3:59	Winnipeg, Manitoba, Canada	
Win	4–3	Lindsey Hawkes	Decision (unanimous)	Ultimate Martial Arts 3	February 17, 2007	3	5:00	Regina, Saskatchewan, Canada	
Loss	3–3	Kevin Manderson	Submission (rear-naked choke)	Rumble in the Cage 21	December 30, 2006	1	4:14	Lethbridge, Alberta, Canada	
Win	3–2	Jason Geiger	Submission (choke)	Ultimate Cage Wars 6	October 28, 2006	2	N/A	Winnipeg, Manitoba, Canada	
Loss	2–2	Tim Jenson	Submission (rear-naked choke)	KOTC: Insurrection	October 6, 2006	N/A	N/A	Vernon, British Columbia, Canada	
Win	2–1	Tom Wutpunne	Submission (rear-naked choke)	Rumble in the Cage 18	September 30, 2006	1	2:51	Lethbridge, Alberta, Canada	
Win	1–1	Josh Kretjo	Submission (rear-naked choke)	Ultimate Martial Arts 2	August 26, 2006	1	4:48	Regina, Saskatchewan, Canada	
Loss	0–1	Rory MacDonald	Submission (rear-naked choke)	Rumble in the Cage 17	June 17, 2006	1	4:04	Lethbridge, Alberta, Canada	Welterweight debut.

== See also ==
- List of male mixed martial artists
- List of Canadian UFC fighters
