= Mixed martial arts in Ontario =

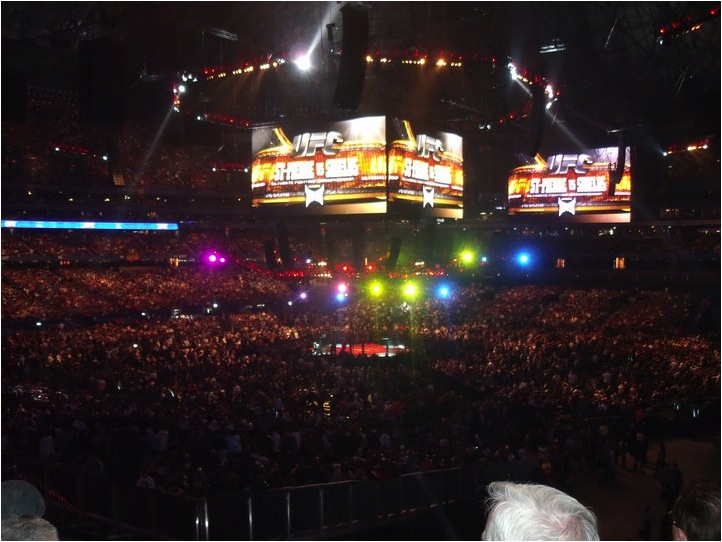
UFC 129 held at the Rogers Centre April 30, 2011 in Toronto

Mixed martial arts (MMA) in Ontario had been considered illegal until August 14, 2010, when the Ontario government announced that they would be moving forward to allow professional mixed martial arts in the province. This was seen as a sudden change in direction as the government has been reluctant to allow MMA events to be held. This paved the way for the largest regulated professional MMA event, UFC 129, which was held on April 30, 2011 at the Rogers Centre in Toronto.

== Background ==
In years previous, when asked about legalizing MMA in Ontario, Premier Dalton McGuinty often dismissed the idea as it was stated "not a priority for Ontario families". However, due to recent overwhelming success of the UFC shows held in Montreal and British Columbia, Ontario realized the potential MMA has in boosting local economies. At the 2008 MMA event held in Montreal, Ontario residents purchased roughly 42% of the tickets sold. Marc Ratner, the Ultimate Fighting Championship's (UFC) Vice-President of Regulatory and Government Affairs commented that MMA is popular in Toronto and on a per-capita bases, it is top of the UFC's market with regards to pay-per-view purchases and viewers.

Following the suite of professional boxing and kickboxing, MMA will fall under the Ontario Athletics Control Act and will be regulated by the Ontario Athletic Commissioner. The commissioner's key responsibilities will include: ensuring promoters and competitors are appropriately licensed, ensuring fees are paid and liability insurance is obtained, in charge of choosing officials and medical personnel, ensuring each competitor is in good standing, attending and overseeing weigh-ins, pre-fight activities and each MMA event to ensure they comply with standards and regulations.

=== Section 83 of the Criminal Code and MMA ===
For years, the government of Ontario has been reluctant to allow MMA in Ontario despite it being allowed in six Canadian jurisdictions and 46 American states at the time. McGuinty, when questioned on the matter of bringing MMA to Ontario, often responded that it was not a priority and the issue was not on his agenda. He believes that if he were to knock on 1,000 doors of Ontario Family homes and ask them about their top three concerns, he would be surprised if any would say that we need to start MMA in Ontario.

There was also an issue in the interpretation of section 83 of the Criminal Code, which makes "prize fighting" illegal. At the time Ontario was considering allowing MMA, this section defined "prize fighting" as follows:

"83(2) In this section, "prize fight" means an encounter or fight with fists or hands between two persons who have met for that purpose by previous arrangement made by or for them, but a boxing contest between amateur sportsmen, where the contestants wear boxing gloves of not less than one hundred and forty grams each in mass, or any boxing contest held with the permission or under the authority of an athletic board or commission or similar body established by or under the authority of the legislature of a province for the control of sport within the province, shall be deemed not to be a prize fight."

Ontario Athletics Commissioner, Ken Hayashi, thought MMA was not an exception to this and that it is not considered boxing, although Ontario allows professional kickboxing. He believed that any combat sport, excluding boxing and kickboxing, is illegal in Ontario (and all of Canada). He was unwilling to budge on the matter causing frustration for MMA lobbyists especially since he was considered the person best positioned to start the legalization process.

=== Lobbying for MMA in Ontario ===
The UFC was responsible for the majority of the lobbying efforts for the sanctioning of MMA in Ontario. They were committed in educating provincial government officials on the sport with hopes to move the legalization efforts quicker. They went ahead with opening an official UFC office in Toronto and placing Tom Wright in charge of the efforts. Tom Wright, former Canadian Football League Commissioner and President of Adidas Canada, was hired to head the Toronto office, as the UFC believed he added creditability to the cause. They believe his accomplishments in the sports, business and community sectors, and the fact that he has lived in Toronto most of his life, will help bridge the gaps more easily than an American.

The UFC also went on to hire Noble Chummar, an attorney with Cassels, Brock and Blackwell, as legal representation for the UFC in Ontario. This lobbyist firm was hired by the UFC to also assist with educating members of the provincial government on the many reasons why the sport should be sanctioned and regulated.

There was also public support for the legalization of the MMA. A Facebook group was made for people who believe the sport should be legal in Ontario. The group grew to have more than 7000 members.

== Legalization of MMA in Ontario ==
In August 2010, the Ontario government announced that they would allow professional MMA events to be held in the province. However, in order to do so the Government would require a system or guidelines to be implemented in order to regulate MMA events. Ontario adopted rules similar to that of the state of New Jersey for the conduct of professional mixed martial arts events. This is the most widely used set of rules regarding MMA, which is also sometimes referred to as the "unified rules of MMA". All MMA events in Ontario will be sanctioned and regulated by the Ministry of Consumer Services.

=== Ontario Economic Trouble and MMA ===
Another possible motivation for Ontario's decision to legalize professional MMA events was financial and economic gain these events can bring to local economies. The government believed that a large MMA event could bring in about $6 million in revenue for the province.

Many credit the fact that Ontario's local economy was struggling the year prior to the decision and that with Ontario having a deficit of around $20 billion at the time. MMA events in Ontario would generate and stimulate Ontario tourism and possibly generate millions in economic activity. Minister of Consumer Services, Sophia Aggelonitis, said, "My other goal is to provide an economic boost for communities who want to hold MMA events." The New Democratic Party, despite criticizing the Liberal government for changing their minds on the sport, supported the legalization of MMA because of the opportunity for economic benefits. The Ultimate Fighting Championship (UFC) has long waited for and petitioned the Ontario government for legalization of the sport. UFC hosted UFC 129 in Toronto and pulled in a record 55, 000 fans and exceeding 11 million in gate revenue, making it the largest and most profitable MMA event in North America.

=== Canadian Medical Association ===
In August 2010, following the sanctioning of MMA in Ontario, Canada's largest doctors association issued a statement asking the government to ban mixed martial arts. About 250 delegates attended the annual Canadian Medical Association meeting that year and voted for the organization to campaign for the ban. Dr. Anne Zoig, the outgoing CMA president, commented that it's the responsibility of the association to promote good health and oppose any activity that would directly lead to maiming and injury to Canadians.

They believe that MMA will lead to serious issues including brain damage and that they cannot support this to continue in Canada. They however have no power in what the policy-makers do with this information.

Since the release of their opposition, the UFC commented that the safety of the fighters is a high priority and that the league will be just as rigorous as any other professional sports organization when it comes to the health and safety of its athletes. The Ontario government has also commented that they would have welcomed any advice from the CMA.

Dr. Shelby Karpman, a doctor who has supervised over 200 martial arts fights, commented that banning this sport would not have been a solution. It is so popular that the possibility of the sport going underground is extremely high. If there was a ban, the fights will continue and will continue without being medically supervised. There would be no medical personnel or paramedics on-sight and the number of sport-related injuries would greatly increase. He believes the opposite and that MMA is a safe sport when supervised. He comments that he had never seen anyone come close to dying in an MMA ring.

== Future of MMA in Ontario ==
It appears that MMA events, such as UFC, will continue to grow in Ontario as such a large fan base has formed. It is anticipated that there will be 10 to 15 professional MMA events, including one large event, will be held annually within Ontario. The UFC will be looking to continue to hold shows in Toronto at both the Air Canada Centre and Rogers Centre. As a possibility in the future, UFC will look for opportunities for holding events in other Ontario cities such as Hamilton, Ottawa and Windsor. The economic benefits to communities that host the events could be substantial.

There are also MMA organizations that also have plans as a result of Ontario's new regulations. Warrior One (W1), an Ontario-based MMA league, holds about six shows a year in Quebec and other provinces will also be hosting events in Ontario. The W1 wish to host four to five large shows in Toronto, plus a challenger league that would hold matches in every town across the province from Sudbury to Windsor to London to Hamilton. Local athletes would be able to compete, and small towns would be able enjoy the economic benefits. However, W1 has mentioned that they are not competition for the UFC, but in fact the league right below them.

There are local organizations that are promoting positive awareness of mixed martial arts within Ontario, and generating local interest in the sport.

Prospect Fighting Championships (PFC), founded in 2013 is the largest promotion in Ontario and has held 18 events, with four more events planned during 2023.

BTC Fight Promotions is a MMA organization in Ontario, currently running their 6th event on June 1, 2019 in Burlington, Ontario. They are also working on two additional professional bouts, projecting "BTC 7: Annihilation" in Ottawa on August 24, 2019.

Training organizations and clubs will further promote local gyms fighters and coaches. They are also working on creative initiatives that are intended to support fighters from Ontario.

== See also ==
- Judo in Ontario
