= List of PFC events =

List of Prospect Fighting Championships events

Information
- Promotion: Prospect Fighting Championships
- First date aired: October 26, 2013
- Last date aired: Present

This is a complete and up to date list of all the events hosted by the Mixed Martial Arts promotion Prospect Fighting Championships.

== Event list ==
=== Prospect Fighting Championships 26: Knockout Kidney Disease 5 ===
PFC 26
- Promotion: Prospect Fighting Championships
- Date: September 26, 2026
- Venue: RBC Convention Center
- City: London, Ontario, CAN

Prospect Fighting Championships 26: Knockout Kidney Disease 5 or PFC 26 is the 30th event of Prospect Fighting Championships. The event was sanctioned by the OAC, and will take place on September 26, 2026, at the RBC Place in London, Ontario, Canada.

Upcoming

=== Prospect Fighting Championships 25: White vs. Dusek ===
PFC 25
- Promotion: Prospect Fighting Championships
- Date: August 15, 2026
- Venue: Lambton College
- City: Sarnia, Ontario, CAN

Prospect Fighting Championships 25: White vs. Dusek or PFC 25 is the 29th event of Prospect Fighting Championships. The event was sanctioned by the OAC, and will take place on August 15, 2026, in Sarnia, Ontario, Canada.

Upcoming

=== Prospect Fighting Championships 24: Appel vs. Jere ===
PFC 24
- Promotion: Prospect Fighting Championships
- Date: July 18, 2026
- Venue: Caledonia Fairgrounds
- City: Caledonia, Ontario, CAN

Prospect Fighting Championships 24: Appel vs. Jere or PFC 24 is the 28th event of Prospect Fighting Championships. The event was sanctioned by the OAC. It was initially scheduled to take place on June 20, 2026, at the Bond Street Event Centre in Oshawa, Ontario, Canada, but due to the 2026 FIFA World Cup, it took place on July 18, 2026, at the Caledonia Fairgrounds in Caledonia, Ontario, Canada.

Results

Main Card
Weight class				Method	Round	Time	Notes
Welterweight	Aiden Appel	def.	Chandi Jere	Submission (standing guillotine choke)	1	2:47	(Note: For the PFC Welterweight Championship)
Featherweight	Samir Ahmad	def.	Uros Bozic	Decision (unanimous)	3	3:00	(Note: For the PFC Featherweight Championship)
Lightweight	Tsheltrim Rabgyel	def.	Hunter Coyne	Decision (unanimous)	3	3:00	(Note: For the PFC Lightweight Championship & Fight Of The Night)
Heavyweight	Mark-Nikita Taks	def.	Jay Kielec	TKO (cut)	1	1:58
Middleweight	Nathan Cryer	def.	Adam Shhadeh	TKO (punches)	1	0:21	(Note: Knockout Of The Night)
Catchweight (147 lbs)	Lucas Clouser	def.	Nick Hatton	Submission (rear-naked choke)	1	2:14
Preliminary Card
Lightweight	Hayley Malcolm	def.	Charlie Mitchall	Decision (split)	3	3:00
Bantamweight	Gavin Sicotte	def.	Daniel Gombos	Decision (unanimous)	3	3:00
Featherweight	Liam Walker	def.	Maximus Clements	Decision (unanimous)	3	3:00
Welterweight	Chris Henhawk	def.	Chris Brochu	Decision (split)	3	3:00
Welterweight	Mohammad Mahdi	def.	Dylan Majeste	Decision (unanimous)	3	3:00

=== Prospect Fighting Championships 23: Appel vs. Anaya ===
PFC 23
- Promotion: Prospect Fighting Championships
- Date: May 9, 2026
- Venue: Central Niagara
- City: Niagara-on-the-Lake, Ontario, CAN

Prospect Fighting Championships 23: Appel vs. Anaya or PFC 23 is the 27th event of Prospect Fighting Championships. The event was sanctioned by the OAC, and took place on May 9, 2026, at the Central Niagara Center in Niagara-on-the-Lake, Ontario, Canada.

Results

Main Card
Weight class				Method	Round	Time	Notes
Welterweight	Aiden Appel	def.	Sergio Anaya	Submission (rear-naked choke)	3	3:00	(Note: For the PFC Welterweight Championship & Submission Of The Night)
Featherweight	Samir Ahmad	def.	Gaetano Pocchi	Decision (split)	3	3:00	(Note: For the PFC Featherweight Championship)
Featherweight	Jo Duarte	def.	Amanda Gans	Decision (unanimous)	3	3:00	(Note: For the PFC Women's Featherweight Championship)
Bantamweight	Mikolai Dusek	def.	Paul Jaworsky	Decision (unanimous)	3	3:00
Lightweight	Taj Alami	def.	Evan Wood	Decision (unanimous)	3	3:00
Middleweight	Brayden Furlong	def.	Dylan Dale	Decision (unanimous)	3	3:00
Preliminary Card
Middleweight	Alex Petty	def.	Adam Shhadeh	TKO (ground and pound)	2	1:10
Lightweight	Corey Potts	def.	Robert Burk	Submission (standing guillotine choke)	2	1:35	(Note: Fight Of The Night)
Lightweight	Mohammad Mahdi	def.	Upraaj Sandhu	Decision (unanimous)	3	3:00
Welterweight	Antonin Petiteville	def.	Kojo Bagliano	TKO (strikes)	2	0:09	(Note: Knockout Of The Night)
Lightweight	Ryan Moucheshi	def.	Nathan Lizotte	Submission (rear-naked choke)	1	1:40
Welterweight	Pavlo Bulesta	def.	Mustafa Nahid	Decision (split)	3	3:00

=== Prospect Fighting Championships 22: White vs. Melo ===
PFC 22
- Promotion: Prospect Fighting Championships
- Date: April 25, 2026
- Venue: Royal SCITS Academy
- City: Sarnia, Ontario, CAN

Prospect Fighting Championships 22: White vs. Melo or PFC 22 was the 26th event of Prospect Fighting Championships. The event was sanctioned by the OAC, and took place on April 25, 2026, at the Royal SCITS Academy in Sarnia, Ontario, Canada.

Results

Main Card
Weight class				Method	Round	Time	Notes
Bantamweight	Lenny White	def.	Shane Melo	Submission (rear naked choke)	1	2:17	(Note: For the PFC Bantamweight Championship)
Middleweight	Mike Lasky	def.	Craig McDonald	Decision (unanimous)	3	3:00
Middleweight	Hudson Adair	def.	Adam Shhadeh	TKO (punches)	1	2:11
Featherweight	Rykan Daye	def.	Tyler Bundon	Decision (unanimous)	3	3:00
Lightweight	Mohammed Mahdi	def.	Matthew Maclean	KO (ground and pound)	1	1:04	(Note: Knockout Of The Night)
Bantamweight	Blake Bennett	def.	Stephin Ramos	TKO (ground and pound)	3	2:42	(Note: Fight Of The Night)
Welterweight	Eghosa Igbinenikaro	def.	Robert Burk	TKO (ground and pound)	1	1:55
Preliminary Card
Heavyweight	Chad Hunt	def.	Jay Kielec	Submission (rear-naked choke)	1	0:37	(Note: Submission Of The Night (Tied))
Atomweight	Jill Ritchie	def.	Shima Bagherian	Verbal Submission (armbar)	1	2:42
Catchweight (175 lbs)	Abhimanyu Chadha	def.	Shane Barker	Submission (triangle choke)	1	0:37	(Note: Submission Of The Night (Tied))
Bantamweight	Manuchehr Orzuev	def.	Ethan Mackin	Submission (kimura)	2	2:24
Lightweight	Zohair Zahid	def.	Taro Barrientos	Decision (split)	3	3:00
Lightweight	Ayham Saqr	def.	Logan Carpenter	TKO (referee stoppage)	1	2:30

=== Prospect Fighting Championships 21: North vs. Pocchi ===
PFC 21
- Promotion: Prospect Fighting Championships
- Date: February 28, 2026
- Venue: RBC Convention Center
- City: London, Ontario, CAN

Prospect Fighting Championships 21: North vs. Pocchi or PFC 21 is the 25th event of Prospect Fighting Championships. The event was sanctioned by the OAC, and took place on February 28, 2026, at the RBC Place in London, Ontario, Canada.

Results

Main Card
Weight class				Method	Round	Time	Notes
Featherweight	Gaetano Pocchi	def.	Liam North	Submission (rear naked choke)	1	1:57	(Note: For the PFC Featherweight Championship)
Welterweight	Aiden Appell	def.	Hudson Adair	TKO (ground and pound)	2	1:44	(Note: For the PFC Welterweight Championship)
Lightweight	Stevie Ray Doxtator	def.	Chris Brochu	TKO (punches)	2	2:12
Middleweight	Ty Kelly	def.	Craig McDonald	Decision (unanimous)	3	3:00
Welterweight	Austin Cable	def.	Matthew Cooper	Decision (unanimous)	3	3:00	(Note: Fight Of The Night)
Middleweight	Ognjens Bozic	def.	Daniel Skutta	Submission (arm triangle choke)	3	0:51
Featherweight	Aiden Davies	def.	Rykan Daye	Submission (guillotine choke)	1	2:05
Preliminary Card
Lightweight	Matthew Maclean	def.	Leo Rodrigues	Decision (split)	3	3:00
Featherweight	Sohail Rasooli	def.	Justin Ritchie	Decision (unanimous)	3	3:00
Featherweight	Macrae Warnell	def.	Christian Mair	Submission (rear naked choke)	1	1:55
Bantamweight	Lenny White	def.	Gençalo Melo	Submission (rear naked choke)	1	2:23
Middleweight	Connor Daly	def.	Luke Middaugh	Submission (rear naked choke)	1	2:35
Catchweight (177 lbs)	Abhimanyu Chadha	def.	Syed Razvi	Submission (rear naked choke)	3	2:47

=== Prospect Fighting Championships 20: Fightmare At 100 Kellogg's Lane ===
PFC 20: Fightmare At 100 Kellogg's Lane
- Promotion: Prospect Fighting Championships
- Date: October 25, 2025
- Venue: Kellogg's Entertainment Complex
- City: London, Ontario, CAN

Prospect Fighting Championships 20: Fightmare At 100 Kellogg's Lane or PFC 20: Fightmare At 100 Kellogg's Lane was the 24th event of Prospect Fighting Championships. The event was sanctioned by the OAC, and took place on October 25, 2025, at the Kellogg's Entertainment Complex in London, Ontario, Canada.

Results

Main Card
Weight class				Method	Round	Time	Notes
Featherweight	Brayden Todd	def.	Justin Ritchie	Submission (d'arce choke)	2	0:38
Featherweight	Julian Carmona	def.	Ahmad Zubair	Technical Submission (guillotine choke)	2	2:36	(Note: Submission Of The Night)
Welterweight	Austin Cable	def.	Austin Van Sickle	TKO (head kick and punches)	1	0:29
Welterweight	Matt Brown	def.	Matthew Cooper	TKO (ground and pound)	2	1:27
Crusierweight	Jay Kielec	def.	Matteo McFarland	TKO (verbal)	1	2:36
Lightweight	Ricardo Martinez	def.	Joshua Henshaw	Submission (rear naked choke)	1	2:13
Preliminary Card
Lightweight	Chris Brochu	def.	Waasnode Lefort	Submission (rear naked choke)	1	1:28
Bantamweight	Granit Mijalica	def.	M. Abdulrahimzai	KO (punch)	1	0:13	(Note: Knockout Of The Night)
Featherweight	Elias Haidari	def.	Michael Bento	Submission (rear naked choke)	1	1:24
Middleweight	Adam Shhadeh	def.	Ryan Russell	TKO (retirement)	1	3:00
Bantamweight	Lenny White	def.	Ramain McFarlane	Decision (unanimous)	3	3:00	(Note: Fight Of The Night)

=== Prospect Fighting Championships 19: Novice Edition ===
PFC 19: Novice Edition
- Promotion: Prospect Fighting Championships
- Date: July 19, 2025
- Venue: Kellogg's Entertainment Complex
- City: London, Ontario, CAN

Prospect Fighting Championships 19: Novice Edition or PFC 19: Novice Edition was the 23rd event of Prospect Fighting Championships and saw its return from a 16-month hiatus. The event took place on July 19, 2025, at the Kellogg's Entertainment Complex in London, Ontario, Canada.

Results

Main Card
Weight class				Method	Round	Time	Notes
Welterweight	Adrian Brown	def.	Matthew Cooper	TKO (punches)	1	0:31
Featherweight	Liam North	def.	Justin Ritchie	Decision (unanimous)	3	3:00
Lightweight	Ricardo Martinez	def.	Leo Rodriguez	Submission (rear naked choke)	2	0:51
Middleweight	Quinlan Ryan	def.	Adam Shhadeh	Submission (rear naked choke)	1	2:03
Catchweight (195 lbs)	Craig MacDonald	def.	Daniel Skutta	Submission (triangle choke)	2	1:48
Featherweight	Matthew Maclean	def.	Jacob Da Silva	Decision (unanimous)	3	3:00
Preliminary Card
Light Heavyweight	Aaron Smith	def.	Jay Kielec	Submission (armbar)	1	1:08
Featherweight	Brayden Todd	def.	Naj Hikimi	TKO (punches)	3	0:34
Lightweight	Scout Meyer	def.	Waasnode Lefort	TKO (punches)	1	1:40
Catchweight (130 lbs)	Lenny White	no contest.	Ramain McFarlane	No Contest (eye poke)	1	0:15
Lightweight	Zohair Zahid	def.	Luqman Kinnarth	Submission (rear naked choke)	1	2:10
Welterweight	Josiah Mayers	def.	Robert Burk	Submission (rear naked choke)	1	0:52

=== Prospect Fighting Championships 18: Knockout Kidney Disease 4 ===
PFC 18: Knockout Kidney Disease 4
- Promotion: Prospect Fighting Championships
- Date: December 15, 2023
- Venue: RBC Convention Center
- City: London, Ontario, CAN

Prospect Fighting Championships 18: Knockout Kidney Disease 4 or PFC: Knockout Kidney Disease 2023 was the 22nd event of Prospect Fighting Championships, and its first Muay Thai event. The event was sanctioned by the MTO, and took place on December 15, 2023, at the RBC Convention Center in London, Ontario, Canada.

Results

Main Card
Weight class				Method	Round	Time	Notes
Super Middleweight	Shane Nosrat	def.	Brandon Sutton	Decision (unanimous)	3	2:00
Cruiserweight	Adam Yaacoub	def.	Mo Elniwairi	TKO (referee stoppage)	2	1:41
Super Middleweight	Yosief Jabber	def.	Sebastian Pennella	Decision (unanimous)	3	2:00
Welterweight	Jayden Pietersen	def.	Juan Gross	Decision (unanimous)	3	2:00
Preliminary Card
Super Lightweight	Borhan Elhaje	def.	Noah Kirby	Decision (unanimous)	3	2:00
Middleweight	Faisal Rehman	def.	Jamie Ingram	Decision (unanimous)	3	2:00
Catchweight (150 lbs)	Patricia Halligan	def.	Marlena Wlodarski	Decision (unanimous)	3	2:00
Super Lightweight	Quwane Downey	def.	Hassan Safaoui	Decision (unanimous)	3	2:00

=== Prospect Fighting Championships 17 ===
PFC 17
- Promotion: Prospect Fighting Championships
- Date: October 15, 2023
- Venue: Rebel Night club
- City: Toronto, Ontario, CAN

Prospect Fighting Championship 17 or PFC 17 was the 21st event planned by Prospect Fighting Championships. It was to take place on October 15, 2023, in Toronto, Ontario, Canada, but the event was cancelled.

=== Prospect Fighting Championships 16: Mein vs. Chavez ===
Prospect Fighting Championships 16
- Promotion: Prospect Fighting Championships
- Date: April 23, 2023
- Venue: Rebel Night club
- City: Toronto, Ontario, CAN

Prospect Fighting Championships 16: Mein vs. Chavez or PFC 16, it was the 20th event of Prospect Fighting Championships and took place on April 23, 2023, at the Rebel Night club in Toronto, Ontario, Canada.

Results

Main Card
Weight class				Method	Round	Time	Notes
Welterweight	Jordan Mein	def.	Ricardo Chavez	Decision (unanimous)	3	5:00
Lightweight	Kyle Prepolec	def.	Josh Henry	TKO (head kick and punches)	1	2:14
Featherweight	Caleb Moctezuma	def.	Michael Imperato	Decision (unanimous)	3	5:00
Flyweight	Tony Laramie	def.	Sergio Quintero	TKO (ground & pound)	1	4:15
Lightweight	Jimmy Sandlin	def.	Jesse Gross	TKO (punches)	1	2:14
Light Heavyweight	James Foster	def.	Mike Guermoudi	Decision (unanimous)	3	5:00
Atomweight	Isabelle Lacroix	def.	Amanda Lovato	Decision (unanimous)	3	5:00
Flyweight	Matt Dawson	def.	Binaebi Otoru	Submission (armbar)	1	2:07
Preliminary Card
Catchweight (129 lbs)	Steven Sampaio	def.	Gino Ghalehpardaz	Submission (guillotine choke)	2	1:15
Flyweight	Anton Potocki	def.	Jonathan Garcia	Submission (verbal)	1	4:28
Bantamweight	Sierra Dinwoodie	def.	Max Turcotte-Novosedlik	Submission (rear-naked choke)	1	3:40
Flyweight	Thomas Anilowski	def.	Jesus Flores	Submission (rear-naked choke)	1	2:43

=== Prospect Fighting Championships 15: Imperato vs. Toliver ===
Prospect Fighting Championships 15
- Promotion: Prospect Fighting Championships
- Date: March 5, 2023
- Venue: Rebel Night club
- City: Toronto, Ontario, CAN

Prospect Fighting Championships 15: Imperato vs. Toliver or PFC 15, it was the 19th event of Prospect Fighting Championships and took place on March 5, 2023, at the Rebel Night club in Toronto, Ontario, Canada.

Results

Main Card
Weight class				Method	Round	Time	Notes
Catchweight (140 lbs)	Michael Imperato	def.	Musa Toliver	Decision (split)	3	5:00
Atomweight	Isabelle Lacroix	def.	Kara Marie Vislosky	TKO (punches)	1	4:52
Lightweight	Kevin Bastien Popowick	def.	Blake Oswald	Submission (rear-naked choke)	2	0:56
Preliminary Card
Featherweight	Sierra Dinwoodie	def.	Andrea Watson	TKO (strikes)	1	0:34
Flyweight	Anton Potocki	def.	Nigel Crosswell	Submission (rear-naked choke)	1	2:33
Welterweight	Robert Protomanni	def.	Matt Bednarek	Submission (guillotine choke)	3	1:00

=== Prospect Fighting Championships 14: Knockout Kidney Disease 3 ===
Prospect Fighting Championships 14
- Promotion: Prospect Fighting Championships
- Date: October 22, 2022
- Venue: Budweiser Gardens
- City: London, Ontario, CAN

Prospect Fighting Championships 14: Knockout Kidney Disease 3 or PFC 14, it was the 18th event of Prospect Fighting Championships and took place on October 22, 2022, at the Budweiser Gardens in London, Ontario, Canada.

Results

Main Card
Weight class				Method	Round	Time	Notes
Lightweight	Kyle Prepolec	def.	Marco Antonio Elpidio	KO (head kick)	1	3:23
Catchweight (150)	Nathan Williams	def.	Jesse Gross	Decision (unanimous)	3	5:00
Featherweight	Edward Walls	def.	Michael Imperato	KO (punches)	1	1:47
Middleweight	James Foster	def.	Chris Lee Byrne	KO (spinning backfist)	2	4:32
Flyweight	Gino Ghalehpardaz	def.	Matt Dawson	Decision (unanimous)	3	5:00
Preliminary Card
Lightweight	Jamie Ingram	def.	Faisal Rehman	TKO (punches)	1	4:51
Light Heavyweight	Gordon Cunningham	def.	Mike Guermoudi	TKO (punches)	2	2:37
Lightweight	Patrick MacInnis	def.	David Joseph Dawson	Submission (rear-naked choke)	1	2:06
Featherweight	Josh Martiniuk	def.	Matty Hovorka	Submission (armbar)	1	2:12

=== Prospect Fighting Championships 13: Unfinished Business 2 ===
Prospect Fighting Championships 13
- Promotion: Prospect Fighting Championships
- Date: March 08, 2020
- Venue: Rebel Night club
- City: Toronto, Ontario, CAN

Prospect Fighting Championships 13: Unfinished Business 2 or PFC 13, it was the 17th event of Prospect Fighting Championships and took place on March 8, 2020, at the Rebel Night Club in Toronto, Ontario, Canada.

Results

Main Card
Weight class				Method	Round	Time	Notes
Flyweight	Tony Laramie	def.	Claudio Ledesma	Decision (unanimous)	5	5:00	(Note: For the PFC Flyweight Championship)
Bantamweight	Michael Imperato	def.	Matthew Skibicki	Submission (rear-naked choke)	1	2:55
Lightweight	Zackery Powell	def.	Adam De Freitas	Decision (unanimous)	3	5:00
Welterweight	Loyd Galindo	def.	Jorge Britto	TKO (doctor stoppage)	2	0:50
Lightweight	Justin Condie	def.	Jo Petahtegoose	Decision (unanimous)	3	5:00
Preliminary Card
Featherweight	Joe Marchand	def.	Brad Sullivan	Decision (split)	3	5:00
Strawweight	Claudia Baril	def.	Melissa Karagianis	Submission (rear-naked choke)	3	3:58
Bantamweight	Hasmat Sarwary	def.	Binaebi Otoru	Submission (rear-naked choke)	1	4:29
Welterweight	Bobby Poulter	def.	Bryce Gougeon	Decision (unanimous)	3	5:00
Bantamweight	Serge Dancos	def.	Noah Crosswell	Submission (guillotine choke)	1	3:26

=== Prospect Fighting Championships 12: Laramie vs. Cruz ===
Prospect Fighting Championships 12
- Promotion: Prospect Fighting Championships
- Date: September 28, 2019
- Venue: St. Denis Centre
- City: Windsor, Ontario, CAN

Prospect Fighting Championships 12: Laramie vs. Cruz or PFC 12 was the 16th event of Prospect Fighting Championships and took place on September 28, 2019, at the St. Denis Centre in Windsor, Ontario, Canada.

Results

Main Card
Weight class				Method	Round	Time	Notes
Featherweight	T.J. Laramie	def.	Andrew Cruz	Decision (unanimous)	5	5:00	(Note: For the PFC Featherweight Championship)
Middleweight	Elias Theodorou	def.	Hernani Perpetuo	TKO (elbows)	3	2:52
Bantamweight	Manny Alfaro	def.	Freddy Arteaga	Decision (unanimous)	3	5:00
Preliminary Card
Strawweight	Randi Field	def.	Melissa Karagianis	Decision (unanimous)	3	5:00
Lightweight	Justin Condie	def.	Jo Petahtegoose	Decision (unanimous)	3	5:00
Strawweight	Megan Owen	def.	Ashley LeTourneau	Decision (unanimous)	3	5:00
Welterweight	Kris Allard	def.	Zach Junkin	Submission (guillotine choke)	1	3:08
Flyweight	Matt Dawson	def.	Dylan Lacroix	Submission (guillotine choke)	1	4:59
Lightweight	Justin Taveirne	def.	Jamie Flick	Decision (unanimous)	3	5:00

=== Prospect Fighting Championships 11: Knockout Kidney Disease 2 ===
Prospect Fighting Championships 11
- Promotion: Prospect Fighting Championships
- Date: September 28, 2019
- Venue: Western Fair Agriplex
- City: London, Ontario, CAN

Prospect Fighting Championships 11: Knockout Kidney Disease 2 or PFC 11 was the 15th event of Prospect Fighting Championships and took place on September 28, 2019, at the Western Fair Agriplex in London, Ontario, Canada.

Results

Main Card
Weight class				Method	Round	Time	Notes
Featherweight	T.J. Laramie	def.	Paris Stanford	Decision (unanimous)	3	5:00
Lightweight	Armando Gomes	def.	Jesse Gross	Submission (armbar)	1	1:30
Flyweight	Tony Laramie	def.	Darren Mima	TKO (punches)	2	2:22
Cruiserweight (220 lbs)	Chris Lee Byrne	def.	Scott Lamont	Submission (armbar)	1	2:00
Featherweight	Michael Imperato	def.	Mike McAloon	Decision (unanimous)	3	5:00
Featherweight	Joel Paquette	def.	Colton Boxell	Decision (unanimous)	3	5:00
Preliminary Card
Flyweight	Matt Dawson	def.	Nathan Ledger	TKO (punches)	2	1:57
Catchweight (130 lbs)	Nico Kambasis	def.	Gino Ghalehpardaz	Submission (rear-naked choke)	3	3:21
Featherweight	Ryan O'Shea	def.	Seth Connor	Decision (unanimous)	3	5:00
Bantamweight	Teshay Gouthro	def.	Hasmat Sarwary	TKO (punches)	3	3:01

=== Prospect Fighting Championships 10 ===
Prospect Fighting Championships 10
- Promotion: Prospect Fighting Championships
- Date: June 15, 2019
- Venue: St. Denis Centre
- City: Windsor, Ontario, CAN

Prospect Fighting Championships 10 or PFC 10 was the 14th event of Prospect Fighting Championships and took place on June 15, 2019, at the St. Denis Centre in Windsor, Ontario, Canada. The Promotion would return full-time to Professional MMA

Results

Main Card
Weight class				Method	Round	Time	Notes
Featherweight	T.J. Laramie	def.	James Dunn	TKO (punches)	1	3:38
Bantamweight	Manny Alfaro	draw.	Adam Burke MacDougall	Draw	3	5:00
Catchweight (140 lbs)	Eric Montgomery	def.	Cody Kent	Submission (guillotine choke)	2	0:57
Flyweight	Tony Laramie	def.	Sam Debalke	TKO (head kick and punches)	2	4:16
Featherweight	Reyes Cortez	def.	Chuck Mady	KO (punch)	2	3:15
Preliminary Card
Featherweight	Matty Hovorka	def.	Matt Haskell	KO (elbows)	1	0:19
Catchweight (165 lbs)	Jamie Flick	def.	Lance Snow	TKO (punches)	1	1:19
Featherweight	Shane Monaghan	def.	Craig Powers	Submission (barbo choke)	1	1:46
Strawweight	Randi Field	def.	Amanda Borg	TKO (punches)	1	4:29
Lightweight	Adam De Freitas	def.	Kris Allard	Submission (rear-naked choke)	2	3:59
Lightweight	Justin Condie	def.	Justin Taveirne	Submission (rear-naked choke)	3	2:45

=== Prospect Fighting Championships 9 ===
Prospect Fighting Championships 9
- Promotion: Prospect Fighting Championships
- Date: July 14, 2018
- Venue: Marconi Club
- City: London, Ontario, CAN

Prospect Fighting Championships 9 or PFC 9 was the 13th event of Prospect Fighting Championships and took place on July 14, 2018, at the Marconi Club in London, Ontario, Canada. This was 1 of 3 WAKO sanctioned Kickboxing events.

Results

Main Card
Weight class				Method	Round	Time	Notes
Light Heavyweight	Gordon Cunningham	def.	Brad Turner	Decision (unanimous)	3	3:00	(Note: For the PFC Light Heavyweight Kickboxing Championship)
Super Welterweight	Jessie McPhee	def.	Cody Chovancek	Decision (majority)	3	3:00
Light Welterweight	Gino Ghalehpardaz	def.	Calvin Caron	Decision (unanimous)	3	3:00
Light Middleweight	Tyler Coleman	def.	Matthew Cooper	Decision (unanimous)	3	3:00
Welterweight	Justin Ritchie	def.	Liam Gallagher	Decision (split)	3	3:00
Lightweight	Dylan Hayes	draw.	Neil Mazumdar	Draw	3	3:00
Preliminary Card
Super Middleweight	Brent Gabel	def.	David Fisher	TKO (referee stoppage)	1	3:00
Light Welterweight	Mason Gaiveo	def.	Isaiah Sharpe	Decision (unanimous)	3	3:00
Bantamweight	Saul Hermenez	def.	Luke Martin	Decision (unanimous)	3	3:00
Lightweight	Laqman Kinnarath	def.	Ryan Bardin	Decision (unanimous)	3	3:00
Bantamweight	Ruqaya Nawaz	def.	Pilar Dieirich	Decision (unanimous)	3	3:00

=== Prospect Fighting Championships 8: Unfinished Business ===
Prospect Fighting Championships 8
- Promotion: Prospect Fighting Championships
- Date: February 17, 2018
- Venue: Marconi Club
- City: London, Ontario, CAN

Prospect Fighting Championships 8: Unfinished Business or PFC 8 was the 12th event of Prospect Fighting Championships and took place on February 17, 2018, at the Marconi Club in London, Ontario, Canada. This was 1 of 3 WAKO sanctioned Kickboxing events.

Results

Main Card
Weight class				Method	Round	Time	Notes
Featherweight	Amro Al Falastini	def.	Matty Hovorka	Decision (Unanimous)	3	3:00	(Note: For the PFC Featherweight Kickboxing Championship)
Middleweight	George Abdallah	def.	Matthew Cooper	TKO (referee stoppage)	2	2:04
Light Heavyweight	Gordon Cunningham	def.	Jeremy Fuchs	KO (head kick)	2	0:17
Light Welterweight	Gino Ghalehpardaz	def.	Liam Gallagher	Decision (split)	3	3:00
Preliminary Card
Middleweight	Brandon Marchant	def.	Faisal Rehman	KO (punches)	1	2:59
Heavyweight	Garth Watkins	def.	Omar Khalifa	TKO (referee stoppage)	3	1:25
Super Lightweight	Braydon Rowe	draw.	Tristan Jarry	Draw (unanimous)	3	3:00

=== Prospect Fighting Championships 7: Knockout Kidney Disease ===
Prospect Fighting Championships 7
- Promotion: Prospect Fighting Championships
- Date: October 7, 2017
- Venue: Western Fair Agriplex
- City: London, Ontario, CAN

Prospect Fighting Championships 7: Knockout Kidney Disease or PFC 7 was the 11th event of Prospect Fighting Championships and took place on October 7, 2017, at the Western Fair Agriplex in London, Ontario, Canada. This was 1 of 3 WAKO sanctioned Kickboxing events.

Results

Main Card
Weight class				Method	Round	Time	Notes
Cruiserweight	Sean Meade	def.	Chad Hunt	Decision (unanimous)	3	3:00
Super Welterweight	Cody Chovancek	def.	Jordan Rowe	Decision (Unanimous)	3	3:00
Heavyweight	Marcello Solinas	def.	Scott Lamont	KO (punches)	3	1:35
Middleweight	Pat MacInnis	def.	Matt Bell	Decision (minority)	3	3:00	(Note: Should have been announced as Majority Draw)
Super Welterweight	Justin Ritchie	def.	Craig Powers	Decision (unanimous)	3	3:00
Super Middleweight	Craig MacDonald	draw.	Jamie Flick	Draw (spilt)	3	3:00
Preliminary Card
Super Lightweight	Liam Gallagher	draw.	Dylan Hayes	Draw (split)	3	3:00
Super Welterweight	Matt Cooper	def.	Justin Fletcher	Decision (majority)	3	3:00
Lightweight	Isaiah Sharpe	def.	Raghuram Raja	Decision (unanimous)	3	3:00
Welterweight	Alex Gluzman	def.	Mike Cristo	Decision (unanimous)	3	3:00
Middleweight	Faisal Rehman	def.	Paul Djelaj	Decision (unanimous)	3	3:00
Light Heavyweight	Jake Young	def.	David Fischer	TKO (referee stoppage)	1	2:00
Light Heavyweight	Gordon Cunningham	def.	Adam Spourle	Decision (minority)	3	3:00

=== Prospect Fighting Championships 6: Paddy Whacked ===
Prospect Fighting Championships 6
- Promotion: Prospect Fighting Championships
- Date: March 18, 2017
- Venue: London Music Hall
- City: London, Ontario, CAN

Prospect Fighting Championships 6: Paddy Whacked or PAFC 6 was the tenth event of Prospect Fighting Championships and took place on March 18, 2017, at the London Music Hall in London, Ontario, Canada.

Results

Main Card
Weight class				Method	Round	Time	Notes
Featherweight	Shane Monaghan	def.	Seth Connor	Decision (split)	5	3:00	(Note: For the Vacant PFC Featherweight Championship)
Heavyweight	Leeroy Johnson	def.	Scott Lamont	Submission (verbal)	1	1:25	(Note: For the Vacant PFC Heavyweight Championship)
Bantamweight	Amro Al Falastini	def.	Wes Wood	TKO (punches)	1	2:27
Bantemweight	Esteban Alva	def.	Matt Dawson	Decision (Unanimous)	3	3:00
Catchweight (120 lbs)	Randi Field	def.	Jessica Hoskins	Decision (unanimous)	3	3:00
Catchweight (160 lbs)	Patrick MacInnis	def.	Steven Eldridge	Submission (rear-naked choke)	2	1:28
Lightweight	Michael Gigliott	def.	Zad Mangat	TKO	3	0:42
Preliminary Card
Featherweight	Cody Chovancek	def.	Gino Ghalehpardaz	Decision (unanimous)	3	3:00
Heavyweight	Ryan Gibson	def.	Jeff Blythe	KO	1	2:07
Featherweight	Matty Hovorka	def.	Cody Koesdibyo	Submission (rear-naked choke)	1	1:50
Lightweight	Kris Allard	def.	Serhiy Sidey	Submission (armbar)	1	2:45
Catchweight (150 lbs)	Justin Ritchie	def.	Luke Hogg	submission (armbar)	1	0:42
Lightweight	Avinash Chowtee	def.	Ryan Dunphy	KO (punch)	1	0:09
Light Heavyweight	Josh Hanley	def.	Ted Wuerch	Submission (head lock)	1	0:48
Catchweight (110 lbs)	Jill Ritchie	def.	Jessica Shaw	Submission (rear-naked choke)	1	1:18

=== Prospect Fighting Championships 5: Deck The Halls With Beers And Brawls ===
Prospect Fighting Championships 5
- Promotion: Prospect Fighting Championships
- Date: December 4, 2016
- Venue: London Music Hall
- City: London, Ontario, CAN

Prospect Fighting Championships 5: Deck The Halls With Beers And Brawls or PAFC 5 was the ninth event of Prospect Fighting Championships and took place on December 4, 2016, at the London Music Hall in London, Ontario, Canada.

Results

Main Card
Weight class				Method	Round	Time	Notes
Bantamweight	Shane Monaghan	def.	Nigel Crosswell	TKO (Punches)	2	2:29	(Note: For the Vacant PFC Bantamweight Championship)
Middleweight	Sean Meade	def.	Marc Solomon	TKO	5	0:15	(Note: For the Vacant PFC Middleweight Championship)
Heavyweight	Scott Lamont	def.	Ryan Gibson	KO (punches)	1	1:59
Featherweight	Matt Dawson	def.	Matty Hovorka	TKO	1	2:16
Featherweight	Seth Connor	def.	Noah Crosswell	Submission (triangle choke)	1	2:35
Featherweight	Cody Chovancek	def.	Leo Rodriguez	Decision (unanimous)	3	3:00
Atomweight (105 lbs)	Isabelle Lacroix	def.	Jessica Shaw	TKO (punches)	1	1:18
Preliminary Card
Welterweight	Jamie Flick	def.	Eric Sandy	Decision (split)	3	3:00
Bantamweight	Maurice Montgomery	draw.	Devin Gibson	draw	3	3:00
Flyweight	Esteban Alva	def.	Cody Koesdibyo	KO (Punch)	1	0:16
Featherweight	Luke Hogg	def.	Jeff Wall	Submission (guillotine choke)	1	0:38
Catchweight (180 lbs)	Craig MacDonald	def.	Kyle Simmons	submission (rear-naked choke)	1	2:32
Featherweight	Austyn Lizotte	def.	Keith Henhawk	Submission (armbar)	1	2:46

=== Prospect Fighting Championships 4 ===
Prospect Fighting Championships 4
- Promotion: Prospect Fighting Championships
- Date: August 13, 2016
- Venue: London Music Hall
- City: London, Ontario, CAN

Prospect Fighting Championships 4 or PAFC 4 was the eighth event of Prospect Fighting Championships and took place on August 13, 2016, at the London Music Hall in London, Ontario, Canada.

Results

Main Card
Weight class				Method	Round	Time	Notes
Light Heavyweight	Kyle Kerr	def.	Nathan Grotenhuis	TKO (Punches)	1	1:54	(Note: For the Vacant PFC Light Heavyweight Championship)
Middleweight	Tobin Cornelius	def.	Michael Guermoudi	Submission (rear-naked choke)	2	2:36	(Note: For the Vacant PFC Middleweight Championship)
Super Heavyweight	Lawrence Bonds	def.	Jeff Fuchs	TKO (punches)	2	2:05	(Note: For the Vacant PFC Super Heavyweight Championship)
Strawweight	Anastasia Nikolakakos	def.	Tia Biason	Submission (armbar)	3	2:16	(Note: For the Vacant PFC Straw-weight Championship)
Heavyweight	Calvin Reddick-Primo	def.	Scott Lamont	TKO (punches)	1	2:40
Bantamweight	Gino Ghalehpardaz	def.	Leo Rodriguez	Decision (unanimous)	3	3:00
Featherweight	Cody Chovancek	def.	Jessie McPhee	TKO	1	2:59
Featherweight	Noah Crosswell	def.	Matty Hovorka	Decision (unanimous)	3	3:00
Welterweight	Eugene Frisa	def.	Ahmed Shishani	TKO (punches)	1	2:06
Preliminary Card
Catchweight (160 lbs)	Courtney Hoagland	def.	Colleen Mayson	Decision (unanimous)	3	3:00
Flyweight	Nate Ledger	def.	Nigel Cosswell	Decision (unanimous)	3	3:00
Catchweight (160 lbs)	Bruce Miano	def.	Justin Ritchie	Decision	3	3:00
Super Atomweight (105 lbs)	Karolyn Pham	def.	Isabell Lacroix	Decision	3	3:00
Welterweight	Brent Gabel	def.	Jack Le	TKO	2	0:41

=== Prospect Fighting Championships 3 ===
Prospect Fighting Championships 3
- Promotion: Prospect Fighting Championships
- Date: March 5, 2016
- Venue: Cowboys Ranch
- City: London, Ontario, CAN

Prospect Fighting Championships 3 or PAFC 3 was the seventh event of Prospect Fighting Championships and took place on March 5, 2016, at the Cowboys Ranch in London, Ontario, Canada.

Results

Main Card
Weight class				Method	Round	Time	Notes
Light Heavyweight	Adam Webber	def.	Adrian Brown	Decision (unanimous)	5	3:00	(Note: For the Vacant PFC Light Heavyweight Championship)
Featherweight	Kyle Brockitt	def.	Shane Monaghan	Submission (kimura)	3	2:17	(Note: For the Vacant PFC Featherweight Championship)
Heavyweight	Scott Lamont	def.	Calvin Reddick Primo	Decision (unanimous)	3	3:00
Middleweight	Sean Meade	def.	Brandon Collings	TKO (submission to strikes)	1	1:39
Flyweight	MacKenna Van Boekel	def.	Randi Field	Decision (unanimous)	3	3:00
Preliminary Card
Lightweight	Michael Gigliott	def.	Tyler Prudhomme	TKO (punches)	2	0:23
Light Heavyweight	Nate Grotenhuis	def.	Jeremy Fuchs	Submission (guillotine choke)	1	1:59
Lightweight	Kyle Kerr	def.	Jesse Vigario	TKO (punches)	1	2:52
Welterweight	Jamie Flick	def.	Jack Le	TKO (punches)	1	1:39
Catchweight (150 lbs)	Gino Ghalehpardaz	def.	Kris Archer	TKO (punches)	2	2:27

=== Prospect Fighting Championships 2 ===
Prospect Fighting Championships 2
- Promotion: Prospect Fighting Championships
- Date: December 8, 2015
- Venue: Cowboys Ranch
- City: London, Ontario, CAN

Prospect Fighting Championships 2 or PAFC 2 was the sixth event of Prospect Fighting Championships and took place on December 8, 2015, at the Cowboys Ranch in London, Ontario, Canada.

Results

Main Card
Weight class				Method	Round	Time	Notes
Heavyweight	Garth Watkins	def.	Scott Lamont	Submission (rear-naked choke)	1	1:15	(Note: For the PFC Heavyweight Championship)
Lightweight	Adam Webber	def.	Aaron Thompson	Submission (armbar)	5	0:56	(Note: For the PFC Lightweight Championship)
Bantamweight	Shane Monaghan	def.	Josh Martiniuk	Decision (unanimous)	3	3:00
Lightweight	Tammy Laflamme	def.	April Hutchinson	Decision (unanimous)	3	3:00
Featherweight	Jessie McPhee	def.	Andrew Vukic	Submission (guillotine choke)	2	1:02
Preliminary Card
Welterweight	Gary Pearson	def.	Jake Young	Submission	2	1:55
Middleweight	Brandon Marchant	def.	Faisal Rehman	Decision (unanimous)	3	3:00
Welterweight	Corey Ratelle	def.	Tyler Prudhomme	Submission	2	0:18
Strawweight	Gloria Kim	def.	Jessica Hoskins	TKO (punches)	2	1:40

=== Prospect Fighting Championships 1 ===
Prospect Fighting Championships 1
- Promotion: Prospect Fighting Championships
- Date: August 29, 2015
- Venue: Cowboys Ranch
- City: London, Ontario, CAN

Prospect Fighting Championships 1 or PAFC 1 was the fifth event of Prospect Fighting Championships and took place on August 29, 2015, at the Cowboys Ranch in London, Ontario, Canada. First event after rebranding to Prospect FC.

Results

Main Card
Weight class				Method	Round	Time	Notes
Catchweight (200 lbs)	Brandon Collings	def.	Curtis Biggs	TKO (punches)	1	1:01
Light Heavyweight	Adrian Brown	def.	Matteo Macfarlane	Submission (guillotine choke)	1	5:00
Heavyweight	Scott Lamont	def.	Jeremy Fuchs	Submission (rear-naked choke)	2	2:00
Welterweight	Dustyn Archer	def.	Jake Young	TKO (punches)	1	1:39
Middleweight	Greg Desrochers	def.	Dwayne Kidd	TKO (punches)	2	3:04
Middleweight	Adam Webber	def.	Jamie Flick	Submission (rear-naked choke)	1	0:00
Welterweight	Zack Michael	def.	Brandon Marchant	TKO (retirement)	3	0:00

=== Provincial Fighting Championship 4 ===
Provincial FC 4
- Promotion: Prospect Fighting Championships
- Date: April 25, 2015
- City: Windsor, Ontario, CAN

Provincial Fighting Championship 4 was the fourth event planned by Prospect Fighting Championships it was to take place on April 25, 2015, in Windsor Ontario, Canada but the event was cancelled.

=== Provincial Fighting Championship 3: Showdown In The Downtown ===
Provincial FC 3: Showdown In The Downtown
- Promotion: Prospect Fighting Championships
- Date: October 18, 2014
- Venue: Budweiser Gardens
- City: London, Ontario, CAN

Provincial Fighting Championship 3: Showdown In The Downtown was the third event of Prospect Fighting Championships and took place on October 18, 2014, at the Budweiser Gardens in London, Ontario, Canada.

Results

Main Card
Weight class				Method	Round	Time	Notes
Welterweight	Jesse Ronson	def.	Dom O'Grady	TKO (punches)	2	0:45
Catchweight(160 lbs)	Jesse Gross	def.	Justin Jaynes	Decision (split)	3	5:00
Flyweight	Randy Turner	def.	Malcolm Gordon	TKO (punches)	2	3:17
Lightweight	Kyle Prepolec	def.	Damion Hill	Submission (rear-naked choke)	2	0:00
Catchweight (160 lbs)	Joey Holt	def.	Adam Assenza	Submission (guillotine choke)	1	1:00
Heavyweight	Blake Nash	def.	Bryan Jordan	TKO (injury)	2	3:04
Lightweight	Neelan Hordatt	def.	David Hale	Submission (rear-naked choke)	1	0:00
Bantamweight	Josh Rich	def.	James Mancini	Submission (rear-naked choke)	2	1:17
Middleweight	Chris Lee Byrne	def.	Rafael Palomeque	Submission (heel hook)	3	0:00
Lightweight	Xavier Nash	def.	Paul Jalbert	Decision (split)	3	5:00

=== Provincial Fighting Championship 2 ===
Provincial FC 2
- Promotion: Prospect Fighting Championships
- Date: March 08, 2014
- Venue: Western Fair Agriplex
- City: London, Ontario, CAN

Provincial Fighting Championship 2 was the second event of Prospect Fighting Championships and took place on March 8, 2014. at the Western Fair Agriplex in London, Ontario, Canada.

Results

Main Card
Weight class				Method	Round	Time	Notes
Strawweight	Randa Markos	def.	Lynnell House	Submission (armbar)	1	1:57	(Note: For the Inaugural Strawweight Championship)
Lightweight	Ryan Healy	def.	Alex Ricci	Decision (split)	3	5:00
Light Heavyweight	Misha Cirkunov	def.	Martin Desilets	Submission (triangle choke)	1	2:36
Heavyweight	Bryan Jordan	def.	Jeffrey Fuchs	TKO (punches)	1	0:36
Lightweight	Kyle Prepolec	def.	Keven Morin	Decision (unanimous)	3	5:00
Lightweight	Devin Murray	def.	David Hale	Submission (rear-naked choke)	2	2:59
Featherweight	Kyle Nelson	def.	Alexander Halkias	Decision (unanimous)	3	5:00
Catchweight (167 lbs)	Scott Hudson	def.	Joel Corbett	TKO (punches)	1	3:13
Catchweight(180 lbs)	Rafael Palomeque	def.	Ryan Waterman	TKO (punches)	1	5:00

=== Provincial Fighting Championship 1: Unrivaled ===
Provincial FC 1
- Promotion: Prospect Fighting Championships
- Date: October 26, 2013
- Venue: Western Fair Agriplex
- City: London, Ontario, CAN

Provincial Fighting Championship 1: Unrivaled was the inaugural event of Prospect Fighting Championships and took place on October 26, 2013. at the Western Fair Agriplex in London, Ontario, Canada.

Results

Main Card
Weight class				Method	Round	Time	Notes
Featherweight	Chris Horodecki	def.	Frank Caraballo	Decision (unanimous)	3	5:00	(Note: The inaugural PFC Main Event)
Lightweight	Michael Karkula	def.	Jesse Gross	Decision (split)	3	5:00
Lightweight	Kyle Prepolec	def.	Adam Assenza	TKO (knees)	2	4:40
Catchweight (134 lbs)	Lynnell House	def.	Shannon Ludlow	TKO (punches)	1	4:17
Catchweight (160 lbs)	Hector Garcia	def.	Joel Paquette	KO (punch)	2	0:42
Bantamweight	Malcolm Gordon	def.	Lloyd Reyes	TKO (punches)	1	3:38
Bantamweight	Darryl Marin	def.	Ryan Thomson	Submission (rear-naked choke)	1	3:11
Strawweight	Randa Markos	def.	Kara Kirsh	Decision (unanimous)	3	5:00
Catchweight (180 lbs)	Woodrow James	def.	Kyle Stephensen	TKO (strikes)	1	1:45
Middleweight	Chris Watson	def.	Ryan Waterman	TKO (punches)	1	1:41
