= Kyle Prepolec =

Canadian mixed martial artist

- Born: August 30, 1989 (age 37); Windsor, Ontario, Canada
- Other names: Kill Shot
- Height: 5 ft 9 in (1.75 m)
- Weight: 155 lb (70 kg; 11 st 1 lb)
- Division: Lightweight (2008–present); Welterweight (2019); Catchweight(2011-2019)
- Reach: 70 in (178 cm)
- Style: Mixed Martial Artist
- Fighting out of: Windsor, Ontario, Canada
- Team: Maximum Training Centre
- Trainer: Paul Rousseau
- Years active: 2008–present

Mixed martial arts record
- Total: 29
- Wins: 18
- By knockout: 10
- By submission: 4
- By decision: 4
- Losses: 11
- By knockout: 2
- By submission: 3
- By decision: 6

Other information
- Occupation: Contractor/Personal Trainer
- Mixed martial arts record from Sherdog

Kyle Prepolec (born August 30, 1989) is a Canadian mixed martial arts (MMA) fighter who competes in the Ultimate Fighting Championship's (UFC) Lightweight division. He is the current SMMA Lightweight Champion and had previously won the BTC Catchweight Championship and the TXC Lightweight Championship.

== Background ==
Kyle Prepolec was born and raised in Windsor, Ontario, Canada. He, like many Canadians, enjoyed playing hockey until he began training in boxing, finding his true calling in combat sports. He wrestled for two years in high school while attending Riverside Secondary School and after graduating began working in construction and home renovations. In 2008 Prepolec decided to pursue a career in mixed martial arts.

== Mixed martial arts career ==
=== Early career ===
Prepolec started competing in mixed martial arts professionally in 2008, he fought in regional promotions mostly in Canada and America earning himself a record of 14–5, including a two-fight run in Bellator facing Lance Snow and Jason Fischer at Bellator 64 and Bellator 76 respectively. During this time he managed to capture 2 Championships in 2 separate promotions. Having previously won both the BTC Catchweight Championship(165 lbs) and the TXC Lightweight Championship when he was invited to sign with the Ultimate Fighting Championship in 2019.

=== Ultimate Fighting Championship ===
Making his first walk to the octagon on little more than a week's notice, in a weight class above his fighting weight Kyle Prepolec faced fellow Canadian and UFC veteran of 10 bouts Nordine Taleb in his promotional debut on May 4, 2019, at UFC Fight Night 151. He lost the fight via unanimous decision.

Returning to Lightweight Prepolec was next set to faced Austin Hubbard on September 14, 2019, at UFC Fight Night 158. Prepolec would come out controlling round 1 with his striking staggering his opponent twice, the second round saw more exchanges on the feet. Hubbard took the fight to the ground. Kyle returned to his feet and continued to exchange until the end of the round. Round 3 saw Prepolec attempt a standing guillotine choke and landed a big elbow on the break, after landing a left hand he was taken down and controlled for almost the remainder of the round. Prepolec forced the fight back to the feet with 45 seconds remaining in the fight, landing a left hook and attempting a spinning back fist, he was forced to defend a take down and controlled the rest of the round attempting a modified guillotine choke. Prepolec lost the fight via unanimous decision.

On March 19, 2020, while nursing an injury Prepolec announced he had been released from the promotion.

=== Post-UFC Career ===
Returning to action after the lockdown in Canada due to COVID-19 Kyle Prepolec faced fellow Canadian Michael Dufort for the inaugural main event of Samuorai 1 for the SMMA Lightweight Championship on November 19, 2021. He won the bout via split decision, becoming the promotions Inaugural Lightweight Champion.

Prepolec faced UFC veteran, Shane Campbell on March 4, 2022, at Unified MMA 43, in a Super Lightweight bout. He lost the bout via unanimous decision.

Prepolec faced Marco Antonio Elpidio on October 22, 2022, at PFC 14. He won the bout by knock out via a head kick in the first round.

Prepolec faced Josh Henry on April 23, 2023, at PFC 16: Mein vs. Chavez, winning the bout via first-round TKO stoppage after landing a head kick and ground and pound.

=== Return to the UFC ===
Replacing an injured Joel Álvarez and on one week's notice, Prepolec made his return to the UFC against Benoît Saint Denis on May 10, 2025, at UFC 315. He lost the fight via an arm-triangle choke submission in the second round.

Prepolec faced Drew Dober on October 18, 2025, at UFC Fight Night 262. After receiving a low blow that led to a one-point deduction for his opponent, Dober, Prepolec was defeated via technical knockout. This fight earned him his first Fight of the Night award.

Prepolec faced Mateusz Rębecki on August 1, 2026 at UFC Fight Night 283. He lost the fight via technical knockout in round one.

== Championships and accomplishments ==
=== Mixed martial arts ===
- Ultimate Fighting Championship
  - Fight of the Night (One time) vs. Drew Dober
- Samourai MMA
  - SMMA Lightweight Championship
- Triple X Cagefighting
  - TXC Lightweight Champion
- BTC Fight Promotions
  - BTC Catchweight Champion

== Mixed martial arts record ==
Professional record breakdown
29 matches	18 wins	11 losses
By knockout	10	2
By submission	4	3
By decision	4	6

Res.	Record	Opponent	Method	Event	Date	Round	Time	Location	Notes
Loss	18–11	Mateusz Rębecki	TKO (punches)	UFC Fight Night: Medić vs. Rodriguez	August 1, 2026	1	4:41	Belgrade, Serbia	
Loss	18–10	Drew Dober	TKO (knees and punches)	UFC Fight Night: de Ridder vs. Allen	October 18, 2025	3	1:16	Vancouver, British Columbia, Canada	Dober was deducted one point in round 3 due to an illegal groin strike. Fight of the Night.
Loss	18–9	Benoît Saint Denis	Submission (arm-triangle choke)	UFC 315	May 10, 2025	2	2:35	Montreal, Quebec, Canada	
Win	18–8	Gustavo Wurlitzer	TKO (punches)	BTC 24	June 8, 2024	1	3:04	Burlington, Ontario, Canada	
Win	17–8	Josh Henry	TKO (head kick and punches)	Prospect FC 16	April 23, 2023	1	2:14	Toronto, Ontario, Canada	
Win	16–8	Marco Antonio Elpidio	KO (head kick)	Prospect FC 14	October 22, 2022	1	3:23	London, Ontario, Canada	
Loss	15–8	Shane Campbell	Decision (unanimous)	Unified MMA 43	March 4, 2022	3	5:00	Enoch, Alberta, Canada	Catchweight (165 lb) bout.
Win	15–7	Michael Dufort	Decision (split)	Samourai MMA 1	November 19, 2021	5	5:00	Montreal, Quebec, Canada	Won the inaugural SMMA Lightweight Championship.
Loss	14–7	Austin Hubbard	Decision (unanimous)	UFC Fight Night: Cowboy vs. Gaethje	September 14, 2019	3	5:00	Vancouver, British Columbia, Canada	Return to Lightweight.
Loss	14–6	Nordine Taleb	Decision (unanimous)	UFC Fight Night: Iaquinta vs. Cowboy	May 4, 2019	3	5:00	Ottawa, Ontario, Canada	Welterweight debut.
Win	14–5	Cody Pfister	Decision (unanimous)	BTC 5	March 9, 2019	3	5:00	Windsor, Ontario, Canada	Catchweight (160 lb) bout.
Win	13–5	Scott Hudson	TKO (punches)	BTC 3	June 23, 2018	2	1:44	Burlington, Ontario, Canada	Super Lightweight debut. Won the vacant BTC Super Lightweight Championship.
Loss	12–5	Troy Lamson	Decision (unanimous)	KOTC: Second Coming	August 5, 2017	3	5:00	Wyandotte, Michigan, United States	
Win	12–4	David Newport	TKO (body punch)	WXC 66	January 13, 2017	2	3:49	Southgate, Michigan, United States	
Win	11–4	Adrian Hadribeaj	KO (spinning backfist)	TXC Legends 7	February 20, 2016	4	4:01	Novi, Michigan, United States	Won the TXC Lightweight Championship.
Loss	10–4	Alex Ricci	Decision (unanimous)	Global Warriors FC 2	May 30, 2015	3	2:03	Burlington, Ontario, Canada	
Win	10–3	Damion Hill	Submission (rear naked choke)	Provincial FC 3	October 18, 2014	2	0:00	London, Ontario, Canada	
Win	9–3	Keven Morin	Decision (unanimous)	Provincial FC 2	March 8, 2014	3	5:00	London, Ontario, Canada	
Win	8–3	Adam Assenza	TKO (knees)	Provincial FC 1	October 26, 2013	2	4:40	London, Ontario, Canada	
Loss	7–3	Kevin Lee	Submission (rear-naked choke)	Michiana Fight League 29	April 13, 2013	2	2:17	South Bend, Indiana, United States	Catchweight (158 lb) bout; both fighters missed weight.
Loss	7–2	Jason Fischer	Submission (arm-triangle choke)	Bellator 76	October 12, 2012	3	3:19	Windsor, Ontario, Canada	
Win	7–1	Jason Meisel	Submission (triangle choke)	Score Fighting Series 5	August 25, 2012	2	2:58	Hamilton, Ontario, Canada	Return to Lightweight.
Win	6–1	Lance Snow	Submission (armbar)	Bellator 64	April 6, 2012	2	2:54	Windsor, Ontario, Canada	Catchweight (160 lb) bout.
Loss	5–1	Mustafa Khalil	Decision (unanimous)	Wreck MMA 8	October 28, 2011	3	5:00	Gatineau, Quebec, Canada	Featherweight debut; Prepolec missed weight (149 lb).
Win	5–0	Benoit Guionnet	TKO (punches)	Ultimate Generation Combat 28	October 1, 2011	1	2:19	Montreal, Quebec, Canada	
Win	4–0	Keven Pellerin	TKO (punches)	Ringside MMA: Rising Star 3	May 14, 2011	1	3:36	Montreal, Quebec, Canada	
Win	3–0	Pete Brown	Decision (unanimous)	Fighting Spirit MMA: Under Fire	May 30, 2009	3	5:00	Oneida 41, Ontario, Canada	Catchweight (165 lb) bout.
Win	2–0	Jayson Dawns	Submission (triangle choke)	Fighting Spirit MMA: Bloody Valentine	February 14, 2009	2	4:04	Oneida 41, Ontario, Canada	
Win	1–0	Justin Potter	TKO (punches)	Fighting Spirit MMA: Superfights	October 18, 2008	1	0:30	Oneida 41, Ontario, Canada	Lightweight debut.

== See also ==
- List of Canadian UFC fighters
- List of current UFC fighters
- List of male mixed martial artists
