= Zahabi =

Zahabi is a surname. Notable people with the surname include:

- Aiemann Zahabi (born 1987), Canadian mixed martial artist
- Firas Zahabi (born 1980), Canadian martial artist
