= Chris Gruetzemacher =

American mixed martial artist (born 1986)

- Born: June 16, 1986 (age 40); Page, Arizona, U.S.
- Other names: Gritz
- Height: 5 ft 8 in (1.73 m)
- Weight: 155 lb (70 kg; 11.1 st)
- Division: Lightweight; Featherweight
- Fighting out of: Surprise, Arizona, U.S.
- Team: 2 Knuckle Sports MMA Academy
- Teacher: Hanshi Nico
- Years active: 2008–2021

Mixed martial arts record
- Total: 20
- Wins: 15
- By knockout: 7
- By submission: 3
- By decision: 5
- Losses: 5
- By knockout: 1
- By submission: 4

Other information
- Mixed martial arts record from Sherdog

Chris Gruetzemacher (born June 16, 1986) is an American mixed martial artist who competed in the Lightweight division of the Ultimate Fighting Championship (UFC). A professional competitor since 2008, he has also competed for Strikeforce, the World Series of Fighting, and was a competitor on The Ultimate Fighter: Team McGregor vs. Team Faber.

== Background ==
Gruetzemachers' mother Julia is from Chile, and her family was granted political asylum to United States with the help of United Churches after his grandfather, who was an assembly man in Chile, was arrested and tortured for three years after an uprising against Salvador Allende changed the regime in Chile. Gruetzemacher was born in Page, Arizona, United States, and at the age of five, his father (Army veteran Jim Gruetzemacher), was shot and murdered in Arizona, this evoked his primal instinct for self-protection where he started wrestling.

Gruetzemacher was a former student at Thunderbird High School where he started his wrestler training. He started training BJJ and Muay Thai in 2007 to get in shape and slowly progressing to compete in MMA. He chose his professional as a fighter after decided to invest his time as an athlete in combat sport and to be part of something great in his life. He worked with the former Thailand national fight team member and multiple Muay Thai world champion, Master Kru Paul, in North Carolina to sharpen his stand up game prior finding his new training base at 2 Knuckle Sports.

A typical training day for Gruetzemacher involves strength and conditioning in the morning, grappling in the evening and works on this stand up game in the later of the day after teaches two BJJ classes at 2 Knuckle Sports MMA Academy.

I would never want to stop fighting. This is who I am. I'm doing what I"m supposed to do ... In all honesty, if they told me I couldn't be a fighter anymore, I wouldn't be able to tell you what I wanted to do with anything.

== Mixed martial arts career ==
=== Early career ===
Gruetzemacher started his professional debut in 2008 and fought most of his fights in Arizona, United States. He was the former fighter for Strikeforce and World Series of Fighting (WSOF). He amassed a record of 12–1 with 11 winning streak where he won back to back wins over UFC veterans Roli Delgado (who was 9 inches taller than Gruetzemacher) and John Gunderson prior signed by UFC.

Gruetzemacher took 21 months hiatus from his torn ACL injury before he stepped back to cage where he was selected as one of the contestants for UFC The Ultimate fighter 22.

=== The Ultimate Fighter ===
Gruetzemacher was selected to be one of the contestants for the UFC TV MMA competition series The Ultimate Fighter: Team McGregor vs. Team Faber, (The Ultimate Fighter 22), fighters from Europe coached under Conor McGregor vs fighters from United States coached under Urijah Faber. Gruetzemacher was coached under team Urijah Faber.

He faced Austin Springer on the Elimination fight and won the fight via TKO on round two. On the Opening Round he was up against Sascha Sharma and won the fight via unanimous decision. He moved on to the Quarterfinals and faced Artem Lobov and suffered a defeat via TKO.

In The Ultimate Fighter 22 episode 7 Gruetzemacher had a verbal confrontation after a heavy drinking session, betting shots on the billiard games, in the house between Gruetzemacher and Julian Erosa where Erosa commented Gruetzemacher's fights were the most boring in the house. The confrontation escalated and got more heated where Erosa challenged Gruetzemacher to act on his aggregation. Gruetzemacher splashes beer and water in Erosa's face. The confrontation eventually scaled down after some posturing and yelling and cooler heads prevailed with no physical fight was committed.

=== Ultimate Fighting Championship ===
Gruetzemacher made his promotional debut on December 11, 2015, at The Ultimate Fighter: Team McGregor vs. Team Faber Finale in Las Vegas, United States, against Abner Lloveras. He won the fight via unanimous decision.

He next faced Chas Skelly at UFC Fight Night: Bermudez vs. Korean Zombie on February 4, 2017. He lost the fight via submission on round two.

Gruetzemacher was expected to face Martin Bravo on August 5, 2017, at UFC Fight Night: Pettis vs. Moreno. He was pulled from the fight and replaced by Humberto Bandenay.

Gruetzemacher faced Davi Ramos on December 9, 2017, at UFC Fight Night 123. He lost the fight via submission in the third round.

Gruetzemacher faced Joe Lauzon on April 7, 2018, at UFC 223. He won the fight after Lauzon's corner stopped the fight after the second round. This win earned him a Performance of the Night bonus.

Gruetzemacher was expected to face Beneil Dariush on November 10, 2018, at UFC Fight Night 139. However, on October 18, 2018, it was reported that Gruetzemacher withdrew from the event and was replaced by newcomer Thiago Moises.

Gruetzemacher was expected to face Jesus Pinedo on March 23, 2019, at UFC Fight Night 148. However, on March 13, 2019, it was reported that Gruetzemacher was pulled from the bout due to injury and was replaced by John Makdessi.

Gruetzemacher faced Alexander Hernandez on October 31, 2020, at UFC Fight Night 181. He lost the fight via knockout in the first round.

Gruetzemacher faced Rafa García on July 31, 2021, at UFC on ESPN 28. He won the fight via unanimous decision.

Gruetzemacher faced Claudio Puelles on December 4, 2021, at UFC on ESPN 31. He lost the fight via a kneebar in round three.

== Championships and accomplishments ==
- Ultimate Fighting Championship
  - Performance of the Night (One time) vs. Joe Lauzon
  - UFC.com Awards
    - 2018: Ranked #2 Upset of the Year vs. Joe Lauzon

== Personal life ==
Former UFC and WEC fighter and current Bellator fighter, Benson Henderson and Gruetzemacher are teammates, and they are longtime training partners.

Since most of his teammates and teachers could not pronounce his last name "Gruetzemacher" correctly (pronounced : Gritz-mock-er) when he was young, they just called him "Gritz" (which is how the beginning of this last name is pronounced) and this is how his nickname 'Gritz" was coined.

Gruetzemacher cut his signature "caveman" long hair and donated it to Wigs for Kids, a charity for children who suffer from cancer, in 2017.

== Mixed martial arts record ==
Professional record breakdown
20 matches	15 wins	5 losses
By knockout	7	1
By submission	3	4
By decision	5	0

Res.	Record	Opponent	Method	Event	Date	Round	Time	Location	Notes
Loss	15–5	Claudio Puelles	Submission (kneebar)	UFC on ESPN: Font vs. Aldo	December 4, 2021	3	3:25	Las Vegas, Nevada, United States	
Win	15–4	Rafa García	Decision (unanimous)	UFC on ESPN: Hall vs. Strickland	July 31, 2021	3	5:00	Las Vegas, Nevada, United States	
Loss	14–4	Alexander Hernandez	KO (punches)	UFC Fight Night: Hall vs. Silva	October 31, 2020	1	1:46	Las Vegas, Nevada, United States	
Win	14–3	Joe Lauzon	TKO (corner stoppage)	UFC 223	April 7, 2018	2	5:00	Brooklyn, New York, United States	Performance of the Night.
Loss	13–3	Davi Ramos	Submission (rear-naked choke)	UFC Fight Night: Swanson vs. Ortega	December 9, 2017	3	0:50	Fresno, California, United States	
Loss	13–2	Chas Skelly	Submission (rear-naked choke)	UFC Fight Night: Bermudez vs. Korean Zombie	February 4, 2017	2	2:01	Houston, Texas, United States	Featherweight bout.
Win	13–1	Abner Lloveras	Decision (unanimous)	The Ultimate Fighter: Team McGregor vs. Team Faber Finale	December 11, 2015	3	5:00	Las Vegas, Nevada, United States	Lightweight debut.
Win	12–1	John Gunderson	Decision (unanimous)	WSOF 9	March 29, 2014	3	5:00	Las Vegas, Nevada, United States	
Win	11–1	Roli Delgado	TKO (elbows)	ShoFight 20	June 16, 2012	3	3:24	Springfield, Missouri, United States	
Win	10–1	Frank Gomez	TKO (punches)	WMMA 1	March 31, 2012	1	3:25	El Paso, Texas, United States	
Win	9–1	Randy Campbell	KO (punch)	Duel for Domination: MMA Extravaganza	November 26, 2011	1	1:07	Phoenix, Arizona, United States	
Win	8–1	Jeff Fletcher	TKO (punches)	Rage in the Cage 153	July 16, 2011	2	2:41	Chandler, Arizona, United States	
Win	7–1	Gabe Rivas	Submission (armbar)	Rage in the Cage 152	May 21, 2011	1	2:25	Chandler, Arizona, United States	
Win	6–1	Ryan Diaz	TKO (doctor stoppage)	Strikeforce Challengers: Riggs vs. Taylor	August 13, 2010	1	N/A	Phoenix, Arizona, United States	
Win	5–1	Nadeem Al-Hassan	TKO (punches)	Rage in the Cage 140	March 20, 2010	1	2:51	Tucson, Arizona, United States	
Win	4–1	Eric Regan	Decision (unanimous)	Rage in the Cage 139	February 13, 2010	3	3:00	Tucson, Arizona, United States	
Win	3–1	Oscar Rodriguez	Submission (armbar)	World Fighting Federation 1	October 3, 2009	1	1:45	Tucson, Arizona, United States	
Win	2–1	Josh Gaskins	Decision (split)	AG: Extreme Beat Down	April 11, 2009	3	5:00	Phoenix, Arizona, United States	
Loss	1–1	Joe Cronin	Submission (guillotine choke)	Rage in the Cage 122	February 28, 2009	1	0:25	Phoenix, Arizona, United States	
Win	1–0	Shawn Scott	Submission (armbar)	Evolution MMA	October 4, 2008	3	1:42	Phoenix, Arizona, United States	Featherweight debut.

== See also ==
- List of male mixed martial artists
