= Tristar Gym =

Mixed martial arts training organization in Montreal

- Est.: 1991; 35 years ago
- Founded by: Conrad Pla; Michel Lavallée; Ron Di Cecco
- Primary owners: Firas Zahabi
- Primary trainers: Firas Zahabi; Conrad Pla; Peter Sissomphou; Hercules Kyvelos
- Past titleholders: Georges St-Pierre: Middleweight Champion (UFC 2017) 185 lb (84 kg; 13.2 st) Welterweight Champion (UFC 2006–2007, 2008–2013) Interim Welterweight Champion (UFC 2007) 170 lb (77 kg; 12 st); Miguel Torres: Bantamweight Champion (WEC 2008–2009) 135 lb (61 kg; 9.6 st); Rory MacDonald: Welterweight Champion (Bellator MMA 2017-2019) 170 lb (77 kg; 12 st)
- Prominent fighters: Rory MacDonald; Georges St-Pierre; Kenny Florian; Miguel Torres; Tom Watson; Kevin Lee; Johnny Walker; Arnold Allen; Gavin Tucker
- Training facilities: Montreal, Quebec
- Website: www.tristargym.com

The Tristar Gym is a mixed martial arts training centre located in Le Triangle Borough in Montreal, Quebec, Canada. Instructors at the gym include Firas Zahabi, Conrad Pla and Georges St-Pierre. Tristar Gym is one of the top professional MMA training camps.

== History ==
The gym was established in 1991 by Conrad Pla, Michel Lavallée and Ron Di Cecco. The three owners was the basis for the name of the gym. Alexandre Choko joined the gym as a fighter in 1992 and eventually bought the gym in 2001. In 2008 he sold the gym to Firas Zahabi. Zahabi had become Georges St-Pierre’s main coach after GSP's loss to Matt Serra (UFC 69). In addition to being the current owner Zahabi is also the head coach at the gym. In 2021, owner Firas Zahabi detailed how his gym had been regularly harassed by the Montreal police force during the COVID-19 pandemic.

== Notable fighters ==
=== Current ===
- Kevin Lee - Former UFC Interim Lightweight Title Challenger
- Johnny Walker - Current UFC Light Heavyweight
- Hatsu Hioki
- Robert Whittaker - Former UFC Middleweight Champion
- Tom Watson
- Andy Main
- John Makdessi - Current UFC Lightweight
- Francis Carmont - Current Bellator Light Heavyweight
- Anthony Smith
- Ryan Ford
- Alex Garcia - Former UFC Welterweight
- Olivier Aubin-Mercier - Former UFC Lightweight
- Joseph Duffy - Former UFC Lightweight
- Kajan Johnson
- Randa Markos - Current UFC W's Strawweight
- Sage Northcutt - Current ONE Welterweight
- Tom Breese
- Nordine Taleb - Current UFC Welterweight
- Chad Laprise
- Joanne Calderwood - Current UFC W's Flyweight
- Stevie Ray (MMA) - Former UFC Lightweight
- Arnold Allen (fighter) - Current UFC Featherweight
- Mickey Gall - Current UFC Welterweight
- Aiemann Zahabi - Current UFC Bantamweight
- Vitor Belfort - Former UFC Light Heavyweight Champion
- Jonathan Meunier - Former UFC Welterweight
- Myles Jury - Former UFC Featherweight
- Mirsad Bektic- Current UFC Featherweight
- Ryan Hall (grappler) - Current UFC Featherweight
- Devon Larratt - Current left and right arm World Armwrestling League Heavyweight Champion

=== Past ===
- Georges St-Pierre - Former UFC Middleweight Champion, Former UFC Welterweight Champion, 9 title defenses (13 title summary - the most ever)
- Rory MacDonald - Former Bellator Welterweight champion, Former UFC #2 Welterweight Contender, Former UFC Welterweight Title Challenger
- Kenny Florian - Former UFC 2-Time Lightweight and Featherweight Title Challenger
- Miguel Torres - Former WEC Bantamweight Champion, 3 title defenses
- David Loiseau - Former UFC Middleweight Title Contender
- Denis Kang - 2006 Pride Welterweight Grand Prix Runner-Up
- Nick Denis
- Ivan Menjivar
- Yves Jabouin
- Mark Boček
- Rick Hawn
- Alex Garcia (fighter)
- Mike Ricci
- Elias Theodorou - Former UFC Middleweight

45.498299°N 73.657647°W

== See also ==
- List of professional MMA training camps
