= Ryan Hall (fighter) =

American practitioner of Brazilian Jiu-Jitsu and mixed martial arts

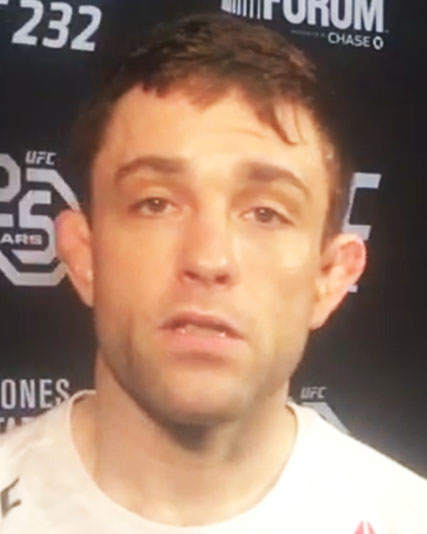
- Hall in December 2018
- Born: Ryan Hall; February 22, 1985 (age 41); Arlington County, Virginia, U.S.
- Other names: The Wizard
- Height: 5 ft 10 in (1.78 m)
- Weight: 145 lb (66 kg; 10.4 st)
- Division: Featherweight; Lightweight
- Style: Brazilian Jiu-Jitsu
- Stance: Southpaw
- Team: Fifty/50 Brazilian Jiu-Jitsu; Tristar Gym
- Rank: 3rd degree black belt in Brazilian Jiu-Jitsu under Felipe Costa
- Years active: 2006, 2012–2021 (MMA)

Mixed martial arts record
- Total: 11
- Wins: 9
- By knockout: 2
- By submission: 3
- By decision: 4
- Losses: 2
- By knockout: 1
- By decision: 1

Other information
- Website: ryanhallonline
- Mixed martial arts record from Sherdog

Ryan Hall (born February 22, 1985) is an American professional mixed martial artist and instructor of Brazilian jiu-jitsu who competed in the featherweight division of the Ultimate Fighting Championship (UFC). He is known for a number of competitive achievements, including Mundial and ADCC victories and dozens of Grapplers Quest championships. He is the winner of The Ultimate Fighter's Season 22 competition.

== Early life and education ==
Hall was born on February 22, 1985, in Arlington, Virginia. Hall attended Manhattan College in The Bronx, New York, where he studied electrical engineering.

== Mixed martial arts career ==
=== Early career ===
Hall made his mixed martial arts debut in 2006 against Eddie Fyvie at Reality Fighting 12: Return To Boardwalk Hall, where he lost the bout via unanimous decision.

In 2012, Hall trained mixed martial arts at Tristar Gym in Montreal, Canada. He returned to the cage after 6 1/2 years and represented his new team for the first time in the cage at SLAMM-1 on November 30, 2012, in Montreal, where he won by TKO in the first round.

Hall fought on the Challenge MMA 2 card on August 17, 2013 in Montreal, where he submitted Maged Hammo.

Hall defeated Leo Perez via TKO at Fight Lab 35 in Charlotte, North Carolina, on February 8, 2014, and submitted Ryan Hogans via first round heel hook at the United Combat League on May 31 in Hammond, Indiana.

=== The Ultimate Fighter ===
On August 31, 2015, it was announced that Hall would be a contestant on the 22nd season of The Ultimate Fighter reality show, representing Team USA.

In the opening elimination bout, Hall faced fellow American Johnny Nunez. He won the fight via heel hook early in the first round.

Hall represented Team USA in the first preliminary fight of the season facing Sweden's Frantz Slioa. He once again won the fight via heel hook in the first round. He advanced to the quarter finals, where he lost to Saul Rogers by majority decision. Rogers advanced to the final, but a visa issue prevented him from fighting, instead allowing Hall to fight Artem Lobov in The Ultimate Fighter 22 Finale. Hall defeated Lobov by unanimous decision to become the Ultimate Fighter 22 lightweight winner.

=== Ultimate Fighting Championship ===
Hall was expected to face Alex White on July 13, 2016, at UFC Fight Night 91. However, the bout was scrapped on June 28 as White pulled out due to an undisclosed injury. In turn, Hall elected to fight on a different date rather than have the promotion find him a replacement.

Hall next faced Gray Maynard on December 3, 2016, at The Ultimate Fighter 24 Finale. He won the fight via unanimous decision.

Hall faced B.J. Penn on December 29, 2018, at UFC 232. He won the fight via a heel hook submission in the first round. This win earned him the Performance of the Night award.

Hall faced Darren Elkins on July 13, 2019, at UFC on ESPN+ 13. He won the fight via unanimous decision.

Despite being a ranked fighter, Hall has made headlines due to his inability to find a fight, going long stretches between matches (with only four fights in over four years since signing with the UFC). He has been vocal about fighting anyone so long as he has been given preparation, but his management and the UFC has had difficulties finding him similarly or higher ranked opponents. Two weeks later, the UFC official found an opponent for Hall.

Hall was scheduled to face Ricardo Lamas on May 2, 2020, at UFC Fight Night: Hermansson vs. Weidman. However, on April 9, Dana White, the president of UFC announced that this event was postponed to a future date The bout was rescheduled on August 29, 2020, at UFC Fight Night 175. However, Hall was pulled from the event due to an undisclosed injury.

Hall was scheduled to face Dan Ige on March 13, 2021, at UFC Fight Night 187. However, Hall pulled out of the fight on February 11 due to a hip flexor injury.

Hall faced Ilia Topuria on July 10, 2021, at UFC 264. He lost the fight via knockout in round one.

Hall faced Darrick Minner on December 11, 2021, at UFC 269. He won the bout via unanimous decision.

In a November 2024 interview, Hall stated that he has had 19 surgeries since his last bout including a torn ACL and that he hoped to compete again in 2025.

On November 18, 2026, it was reported that Hall was removed from the UFC roster.

== Grappling career ==
Hall has earned a number of accolades in professional Jiu-Jitsu competition, the highlight of his career coming in 2009 when he earned a bronze medal at the ADCC world championships. In 2007, Hall fought fellow future-UFC competitor Nate Diaz in the final of the US Open at purple belt, losing by submission and taking second place.

ADCC head organizer Mo Jassim originally stated he was looking at booking Hall to return to professional grappling at the 2022 ADCC world championship. In March, 2022, Hall was given an official invite to compete in the 66 kg division at the event. He withdrew from the event in June, 2022 after suffering a complete tear to his ACL.

Hall was scheduled to challenge Ashley Williams for the Polaris lightweight title in the main event of Polaris 24 on June 3, 2023. Both Hall and Williams withdrew from the event just a week prior.

== Personal life ==
Hall and his wife have a son (born 2018). While a contestant on The Ultimate Fighter, Hall explained that his frequent facial tics are a result of a mild form of Tourette's syndrome.

=== Self-defense incident ===
In 2011, a viral video surfaced showing Hall using grappling techniques to defend himself against a larger, aggressive man while dining in a pizza parlor. In the video, Hall demonstrates the use of a single leg takedown and the mount position. Later, he applies a chokehold to the man shortly before police arrive.

== Championships and accomplishments ==
=== Brazilian jiu-jitsu ===
Main Achievements:

- 2 x IBJJF Jiu-Jitsu World Champion (2007 / 2008 purple)
- IBJJF Jiu-Jitsu European Open Champion (2008 purple)
- IBJJF Chicago Jiu-Jitsu Open champion (2009 Absolute black belt)
- 3rd Place Brazilian National Jiu-Jitsu Championship (2008 purple)
- 3rd Place IBJJF Jiu-Jitsu World Championship (2009 brown)

=== Grappling ===
Main Achievements:

- ADCC US West Coast Trials winner (2009)
- 3rd Place ADCC Submission Fighting World Championship (2009)

=== Mixed martial arts ===
- Ultimate Fighting Championship
  - The Ultimate Fighter 22 Lightweight Winner
  - Performance of the Night (One time) vs. B.J. Penn.
  - UFC.com Awards
    - 2018: Submission of the Year vs. B.J. Penn
- MMA Sucka
  - 2018 Submission of the Year vs. B.J. Penn at UFC 232
- MMA Fighting
  - 2018 Submission of the Year vs. B.J. Penn
- Combat Press
  - 2018 Submission of the Year vs. B.J. Penn

== Mixed martial arts record ==
Professional record breakdown
11 matches	9 wins	2 losses
By knockout	2	1
By submission	3	0
By decision	4	1

Res.	Record	Opponent	Method	Event	Date	Round	Time	Location	Notes
Win	9–2	Darrick Minner	Decision (unanimous)	UFC 269	December 11, 2021	3	5:00	Las Vegas, Nevada, United States	
Loss	8–2	Ilia Topuria	KO (punches)	UFC 264	July 10, 2021	1	4:47	Las Vegas, Nevada, United States	
Win	8–1	Darren Elkins	Decision (unanimous)	UFC Fight Night: de Randamie vs. Ladd	July 13, 2019	3	5:00	Sacramento, California, United States	
Win	7–1	B.J. Penn	Submission (heel hook)	UFC 232	December 29, 2018	1	2:46	Inglewood, California, United States	Lightweight bout. Performance of the Night.
Win	6–1	Gray Maynard	Decision (unanimous)	The Ultimate Fighter: Tournament of Champions Finale	December 3, 2016	3	5:00	Las Vegas, Nevada, United States	
Win	5–1	Artem Lobov	Decision (unanimous)	The Ultimate Fighter: Team McGregor vs. Team Faber Finale	December 11, 2015	3	5:00	Las Vegas, Nevada, United States	Lightweight bout. Won The Ultimate Fighter 22 Lightweight Tournament.
Win	4–1	Ryan Hogans	Submission (heel hook)	United Combat League: Torres vs. Choate	May 31, 2014	1	1:53	Hammond, Indiana, United States	Catchweight (150.2 lb) bout; Hogans missed weight.
Win	3–1	Leonardo Perez	TKO (punches)	Fight Lab 35	February 8, 2014	3	1:44	Charlotte, North Carolina, United States	
Win	2–1	Maged Hammo	Submission (rear-naked choke)	Challenge MMA 2	August 17, 2013	1	2:43	Montreal, Quebec, Canada	
Win	1–1	Phillip Deschambeault	TKO (punches)	Slamm 1	November 30, 2012	1	1:41	Montreal, Quebec, Canada	Featherweight debut.
Loss	0–1	Eddie Fyvie	Decision (unanimous)	Reality Fighting 12	April 29, 2006	3	3:00	Atlantic City, New Jersey, United States	Lightweight debut.

Exhibition record breakdown		
3 matches	2 wins	1 loss
By submission	2	0
By decision	0	1

Res.	Record	Opponent	Method	Event	Date	Round	Time	Location	Notes
Loss	2–1	Saul Rogers	Decision (majority)	The Ultimate Fighter: Team McGregor vs. Team Faber	November 25, 2015 (airdate)	2	5:00	Las Vegas, Nevada, United States	TUF 22 Quarter final round.
Win	2–0	Frantz Slioa	Submission (heel hook)	The Ultimate Fighter: Team McGregor vs. Team Faber	September 16, 2015 (airdate)	1	1:52	Las Vegas, Nevada, United States	TUF 22 Elimination round.
Win	1–0	Johnny Nunez	Submission (heel hook)	The Ultimate Fighter: Team McGregor vs. Team Faber	September 9, 2015 (airdate)	1	0:43	Las Vegas, Nevada, United States	TUF 22 Qualifying round.
