= Artem Lobov =

Russian-Irish mixed martial artist (born 1986)

- Born: August 11, 1986 (age 40); Gorky, Russian SFSR, Soviet Union
- Other names: The Russian Hammer
- Nationality: Russian
- Height: 5 ft 9 in (1.75 m)
- Weight: 146 lb (66 kg; 10 st 6 lb)
- Division: Featherweight; Lightweight; Welterweight
- Reach: 65 in (165 cm)
- Stance: Southpaw
- Team: SBG Ireland
- Trainer: John Kavanagh (Brazilian Jiu-Jitsu); David Jones (Striking)
- Rank: Purple belt in Brazilian Jiu-Jitsu
- Years active: 2010–2021

Mixed martial arts record
- Total: 30
- Wins: 13
- By knockout: 4
- By submission: 2
- By decision: 7
- Losses: 15
- By knockout: 1
- By submission: 2
- By decision: 12
- Draws: 1
- No contests: 1

Other information
- Mixed martial arts record from Sherdog

Artem Lobov (Russian: Артём Лобов; born August 11, 1986) is an Irish-Russian former professional mixed martial artist and bare-knuckle boxer. He previously competed in the Featherweight division of the Ultimate Fighting Championship (UFC) and has most recently competed in the Bare Knuckle Fighting Championship. A professional since 2010, Lobov was also a cast member of The Ultimate Fighter: Team McGregor vs. Team Faber. He has competed for the ACB, Ultimate Fighting Championship as well as the British promotions Cage Warriors and Cage Contender. Fighting out of Dublin, he is a member of SBG Ireland.

== Mixed martial arts career ==
=== Early career ===
Lobov made his professional MMA debut with European promotion Cage Warriors in November 2010. He lost his pro debut to Patrick Vickers via unanimous decision. Prior to his appearance on The Ultimate Fighter, he held a professional record of 11–10–1 with one no contest. A natural featherweight competitor, he also competed at lightweight and welterweight.

=== Absolute Championship Berkut ===
Lobov faced Chechen Rasul Shovhalov on January 31, 2015, at the ACB 13. He won the fight by submission in the second round.

=== The Ultimate Fighter ===
To get into The Ultimate Fighter house, fighters must compete in preliminary fights to advance to the finals. Lobov lost his preliminary bout to Mehdi Baghdad, however coach and teammate Conor McGregor brought him back into the fight as each coach was allowed bring back one additional fighter who lost in the prelims.

In the round bouts he defeated Team USA's James Jenkins by TKO and repeated the outcome in the quarter-finals against Chris Gruetzemacher. In the semis he knocked out Julian Erosa of Team USA to advance to the finals where he would compete against Team Europe's Saul Rogers, a fellow SBG competitor who trains out of their Manchester branch. Due to visa issues Saul Rogers was removed from the finale and was replaced by Ryan Hall of Team USA.

=== Ultimate Fighting Championship ===
Lobov faced Ryan Hall on December 11, 2015, at The Ultimate Fighter 22 Finale. Hall defeated Lobov by unanimous decision.

Lobov next faced Alex White on February 6, 2016, at UFC Fight Night 82. He lost the fight by unanimous decision.

After the defeat to White, Lobov was reportedly in negotiations with a regional promotion in Russia. He was given a lifeline when it was announced that Lobov would face UFC newcomer Chris Avila at UFC 202. Lobov won the fight via unanimous decision.

Lobov faced Teruto Ishihara on November 19, 2016, at UFC Fight Night 99. He won the fight via unanimous decision (30–27, 30–27, and 29–28).

Lobov faced Cub Swanson on April 22, 2017, in the main event at UFC Fight Night 108. He lost the fight via unanimous decision. Both participants were awarded Fight of the Night for their performances.

Lobov faced Andre Fili on October 21, 2017, at UFC Fight Night 118. He lost the fight via unanimous decision.

Lobov was initially scheduled to face Alex Caceres on April 7, 2018, at UFC 223, but was removed from the card for his role in the Team SBG bus assault. This came after a confrontation on April 3, 2018, where Khabib Nurmagomedov and his entourage cornered Lobov and slapped him multiple times due to his previous comments on the fighter.

Lobov was scheduled to face Zubaira Tukhugov on October 27, 2018, at UFC Fight Night 138. However, it was reported that Tukhugov was removed from the fight due his role in the UFC 229 post–fight melee, and he was replaced by Michael Johnson. At weight-ins, Johnson weighed in at 147 pounds, one pound over the featherweight limit of 146 pounds. As a result, the fight proceeded at a catchweight bout and Johnson forfeited 20% of his purse to Lobov, which Lobov later returned. He lost the fight via unanimous decision.

On January 29, 2019, it was reported that Lobov was released from the UFC.

=== Post-UFC career ===
On September 12, 2020, it was announced that Lobov had signed a one-fight contract with Arena Fight Championship. He was expected to make his promotional debut against Ylies Djiroun on December 12, 2020, but the whole event was postponed due to multiple COVID-19 cases.

=== Professional Fighters League ===
After a almost 7-years hiatus from MMA, Lobov was scheduled to return against Zubaira Tukhugov on October 3, 2025, at PFL Champions Series 3. However on September 30, the promotion announced that the bout was scrapped due to an injury Lobov suffered in training.

== Bare knuckle boxing ==
=== Bare Knuckle Fighting Championship ===
Shortly after his UFC release, it was announced that Lobov signed a three-fight contract with Bare Knuckle Fighting Championship (BKFC), with a clause to be able to compete in MMA also. He faced Jason Knight in the main event of BKFC 5 on April 6, 2019. He won the fight via unanimous decision.

Lobov's next fight was against Paulie Malignaggi, with whom he had a physical altercation during the BKFC media day before his bout with Knight. Malignaggi has history with Lobov's training partner, Conor McGregor, and the bout between Lobov and Malignaggi was billed to be a "grudge match" and took place at BKFC 6 on June 22, 2019. Lobov won the fight via unanimous decision. After a consensus strong opening two rounds for Malignaggi, Lobov utilized forward pressure and volume to win in rounds three through five, earning a 48–47 on all three judges' scorecards.

Lobov faced Jason Knight in a rematch headlining BKFC 9 on November 16, 2019. Knight won by TKO via corner stoppage in the fifth and final round.

=== Mahatch FC ===
Lobov faced Ukrainian 2012 Olympic silver medalist and professional boxer Denys Berinchyk in a bare-knuckle match at Mahatch FC in Kyiv, Ukraine on July 24, 2021. Lobov was knocked down in the third and fourth rounds and ultimately lost by TKO after failing to come out for the fifth round.

== Championships & accomplishments ==
=== Mixed martial arts ===
- Ultimate Fighting Championship
  - Fight of the Night (One time) vs. Cub Swanson

=== Bare-knuckle boxing ===
- Bare Knuckle Fighting Championship
  - BKFC Fight of the Year 2019 vs. Jason Knight 1

== Mixed martial arts record ==
Professional record breakdown
30 matches	13 wins	15 losses
By knockout	4	1
By submission	2	2
By decision	7	12
Draws	1	
No contests	1	

Res.	Record	Opponent	Method	Event	Date	Round	Time	Location	Notes
Loss	13–15–1 (1)	Michael Johnson	Decision (unanimous)	UFC Fight Night: Volkan vs. Smith	October 27, 2018	3	5:00	Moncton, New Brunswick, Canada	Catchweight (147 lb) bout; Johnson missed weight.
Loss	13–14–1 (1)	Andre Fili	Decision (unanimous)	UFC Fight Night: Cowboy vs. Till	October 21, 2017	3	5:00	Gdańsk, Poland	
Loss	13–13–1 (1)	Cub Swanson	Decision (unanimous)	UFC Fight Night: Swanson vs. Lobov	April 22, 2017	5	5:00	Nashville, Tennessee, United States	Fight of the Night.
Win	13–12–1 (1)	Teruto Ishihara	Decision (unanimous)	UFC Fight Night: Mousasi vs. Hall 2	November 19, 2016	3	5:00	Belfast, Northern Ireland	
Win	12–12–1 (1)	Chris Avila	Decision (unanimous)	UFC 202	August 20, 2016	3	5:00	Las Vegas, Nevada, United States	
Loss	11–12–1 (1)	Alex White	Decision (unanimous)	UFC Fight Night: Hendricks vs. Thompson	February 6, 2016	3	5:00	Las Vegas, Nevada, United States	Return to Featherweight.
Loss	11–11–1 (1)	Ryan Hall	Decision (unanimous)	The Ultimate Fighter: Team McGregor vs. Team Faber Finale	December 11, 2015	3	5:00	Las Vegas, Nevada, United States	The Ultimate Fighter 22 Lightweight Tournament Final.
Win	11–10–1 (1)	Rasul Shovhalov	Submission (armbar)	ACB 13	January 31, 2015	2	1:32	Płock, Poland	Submission of the Night.
Draw	10–10–1 (1)	Pawel Kielek	Draw (majority)	Fighters Arena 10	November 22, 2014	3	5:00	Bełchatów, Poland	
Win	10–10 (1)	Andrew Fisher	TKO (punches)	Cage Warriors 70	August 16, 2014	3	4:59	Dublin, Ireland	Featherweight bout.
Loss	9–10 (1)	Michael Doyle	Decision (unanimous)	Clan Wars 19	June 7, 2014	3	5:00	Belfast, Northern Ireland	For the Clan Wars Lightweight Championship.
Loss	9–9 (1)	Andre Winner	Decision (unanimous)	All or Nothing 6	May 3, 2014	3	5:00	Leeds, England	All or Nothing Lightweight Tournament Final.
Win	9–8 (1)	Ali Maclean	Decision (split)	All or Nothing 6	May 3, 2014	3	5:00	Leeds, England	Return to Lightweight. All or Nothing Lightweight Tournament Semifinal.
Loss	8–8 (1)	Alex Enlund	Technical Submission (rear-naked choke)	Cage Warriors 65	March 1, 2014	1	2:24	Dublin, Ireland	
Win	8–7 (1)	Martin Svensson	TKO (punches)	Trophy MMA 3	December 28, 2013	2	3:51	Malmö, Sweden	Return to Featherweight.
Loss	7–7 (1)	Christian Holley	Decision (unanimous)	OMMAC 19	November 30, 2013	3	5:00	Liverpool, England	
Win	7–6 (1)	Kamil Gniadek	Decision (unanimous)	Immortals Fight Promotions 1	August 31, 2013	3	5:00	Aberdeen, Scotland	Return to Lightweight.
Win	6–6 (1)	Andy Green	TKO (elbows)	Immortal FC 8	June 8, 2013	1	N/A	Letterkenny, Ireland	
Win	5–6 (1)	Alex Leite	Decision (split)	Cage Contender 17	May 25, 2013	3	5:00	Newry, Northern Ireland	Return to Featherweight.
NC	4–6 (1)	Artur Sowiński	NC (overturned)	Celtic Gladiator 5	September 22, 2012	3	5:00	Dublin, Ireland	Lightweight debut. Originally a majority decision win for Lobov; overturned by promoter after Sowiński appealed the decision.
Loss	4–6	Jay Furness	Decision (unanimous)	Cage Warriors: Fight Night 7	September 1, 2012	3	5:00	Amman, Jordan	Catchweight (165 lb) bout.
Win	4–5	Shay Walsh	TKO (punches)	OMMAC 14	July 28, 2012	3	0:22	Liverpool, England	
Loss	3–5	Araik Margarian	Decision (unanimous)	Pancrase FC 4	April 14, 2012	3	5:00	Marseille, France	
Win	3–4	Kamil Korycki	Decision (unanimous)	Cage Warriors 46	May 28, 2012	3	5:00	Kyiv, Ukraine	
Loss	2–4	Saul Rogers	Decision (split)	Budo FC 3	November 5, 2011	3	5:00	Bolton, England	
Loss	2–3	Mike Wilkinson	TKO (punches)	Raw Promotions 1	September 11, 2011	2	3:52	Liverpool, England	
Loss	2–2	Steve O'Keefe	Technical Submission (rear-naked choke)	Cage Warriors 43	July 9, 2011	3	1:24	London, England	
Win	2–1	Uche Ihiekwe	Submission (triangle choke)	OMMAC 10	June 4, 2011	3	1:07	Liverpool, England	
Win	1–1	Dave Hill	Decision (unanimous)	Cage Warriors 41	April 24, 2011	3	5:00	London, England	
Loss	0–1	Patrick Vickers	Decision (unanimous)	Cage Warriors 39	November 27, 2010	2	5:00	Cork, Ireland	Featherweight debut.

Exhibition record breakdown		
4 matches	3 wins	1 loss
By knockout	3	0
By decision	0	1

Res.	Record	Opponent	Method	Event	Date	Round	Time	Location	Notes
Win	3–1	Julian Erosa	TKO (punches)	The Ultimate Fighter: Team McGregor vs Team Faber	December 9, 2015	1	1:00	Las Vegas, Nevada, United States	TUF 22 Semifinal.
Win	2–1	Chris Gruetzemacher	KO (punches)	The Ultimate Fighter: Team McGregor vs Team Faber	November 25, 2015	2	3:15	Las Vegas, Nevada, United States	TUF 22 Quarterfinal.
Win	1–1	James Jenkins	TKO (punches)	The Ultimate Fighter: Team McGregor vs Team Faber	November 11, 2015	1	4:07	Las Vegas, Nevada, United States	TUF 22 Elimination Round.
Loss	0–1	Mehdi Baghdad	Decision (majority)	The Ultimate Fighter: Team McGregor vs Team Faber	September 9, 2015	2	5:00	Las Vegas, Nevada, United States	TUF 22 preliminary round. Later returned as an alternate.

== Bare knuckle record ==
Professional record breakdown
4 matches	2 wins	2 losses
By knockout	0	2
By decision	2	0

Res.	Record	Opponent	Method	Event	Date	Round	Time	Location	Notes
Loss	2–2	Denys Berinchyk	TKO (retirement)	Mahatch FC 6	July 24, 2021	4	2:00	Kyiv, Ukraine	
Loss	2–1	Jason Knight	TKO (corner stoppage)	BKFC 9	November 16, 2019	5	0:27	Biloxi, Mississippi, United States	
Win	2–0	Paulie Malignaggi	Decision (unanimous)	BKFC 6	June 22, 2019	5	2:00	Tampa, Florida, United States	
Win	1–0	Jason Knight	Decision (unanimous)	BKFC 5	April 6, 2019	5	2:00	Biloxi, Mississippi, United States	Fight of the Year (2019).

== See also ==
- List of current UFC fighters
- List of male mixed martial artists
