= Carmine Nigro =

American chess coach (1910–2001)

- Born: Carmine Domenico Nigro; January 2, 1910
- Died: August 16, 2001 (aged 91); Peachtree City, Georgia, U.S.

Carmine Domenico Nigro (/ˈnaɪɡroʊ/ NY-groh; January 2, 1910 – August 16, 2001) was former World Champion Bobby Fischer's first chess teacher, from 1951 to 1956.

== Biography ==
"Mr. Nigro was possibly not the best player in the world, but he was a very good teacher." – Bobby Fischer

Nigro was an American chess expert of near master strength and an instructor. Nigro was President of the Brooklyn Chess Club. This is where he met Bobby Fischer and in 1951 became his first chess teacher. Nigro (rated 2028) hosted Fischer's first chess tournament at his home in 1952.

Nigro introduced Fischer to future grandmaster William Lombardy, and, starting in September 1954, Lombardy began coaching Fischer in private.

In 1956, Nigro moved to Florida and became a professional golf instructor. He did not give up teaching chess, though, and in 1996 he taught chess at the Meyer Jewish Academy. In 1999, Nigro moved to Peachtree City, Georgia, to be close to his son Bill Nigro. He died in 2001, at the age of 91.

== In film ==
In the 2014 American biographical film Pawn Sacrifice, Carmine Nigro was played by Conrad Pla.

== Sources ==
- Brady, Frank (2011), Endgame: Bobby Fischer's Remarkable Rise and Fall – from America's Brightest Prodigy to the Edge of Madness (1st ed.), Crown, ISBN 978-0-307-46390-6
- Fischer, Bobby (1959), Bobby Fischer's Games of Chess, Simon and Schuster
- Lombardy, William (2011). Understanding Chess: My System, My Games, My Life. Russell Enterprises. ISBN 978-1-93649-022-6.
- Sloan, Peter Julius Aravena; Aravena, Anda (2012). NY Chess Since 1972: A Guide Book Of Places To Go And People You Will See Around NY Chess (Volume 1). CreateSpace. ISBN 978-1-460961-41-4.
- Wall, Bill mentions Nigro (no date)
