= The Ultimate Fighter: Team McGregor vs. Team Faber =

UFC mixed martial arts television series and event in 2015

- Genre: Reality, Sports
- Created by: Frank Fertitta III, Lorenzo Fertitta, Dana White
- Starring: Dana White, Conor McGregor, Urijah Faber
- Country of origin: United States

Production
- Running time: 60 minutes

Original release
- Network: Fox Sports 1
- Release: September 9 – December 9, 2015

The Ultimate Fighter: Team McGregor vs. Team Faber (also known as The Ultimate Fighter 22) is an installment of the Ultimate Fighting Championship (UFC)-produced reality television series The Ultimate Fighter.

On July 12, 2015 it was announced that the coaches for the season would be Conor McGregor and Urijah Faber. The coaches were not expected to face each other at the end of the season.

The UFC held open tryouts for the show on March 29, 2015. The casting call was for Lightweight fighters who are at least 21 years old and have a minimum of two wins in three professional fights. It was announced on July 12 by Dana White that 16 lightweights would be on the show – eight from the United States, and eight from Europe. In August 2015, the UFC officially announced the cast of this season, featuring 32 fighters competing in qualifying fights to enter the show.

== Cast ==
=== Teams ===
Team McGregor

- Conor McGregor, Head Coach

Assistant coaches:

- Owen Roddy
- Sergey Pikulskiy
- Tom Egan
- Arkadiusz Sternalski

Team Faber

- Urijah Faber, Head Coach

Assistant Coaches:

- Andre Fili
- Cody Garbrandt
- Lance Palmer
- Fabio Prado

=== Fighters ===
- Team McGregor (Europe):
  - Abner Lloveras (Spain), David Teymur (Sweden), Frantz Slioa (Sweden), Marcin Wrzosek (Poland), Martin Svensson (Sweden), Mehdi Baghdad (France), Sascha Sharma (Germany), Saul Rogers (England), Artem Lobov (Ireland).
- Team Faber (United States):
  - Billy Quarantillo, Chris Gruetzemacher, James Jenkins, Jason Gonzaléz, Julian Erosa, Ryan Hall, Thanh Le, Tom Gallicchio, Johnny Nuñez.
- Fighters eliminated during the entry round
  - Europe: Thibault Gouti (France), Paulo Boer (Netherlands), Martin Delaney (Scotland), Vlado Sikic (Croatia), Mohamed Grabinski (Germany), Djamil Chan (Netherlands), Sean Carter (England).
  - United States: Johnny Nuñez, Andres Quintana, Jason Soares, Brandon Ricetti, Tim Welch, Mike Flach, Austin Springer, Brennan Sevin.

== Episodes ==
Episode 1: Europe vs. United States (September 9, 2015)

- Dana White welcomed the 32 fighters, consisting of all lightweights, to the show. He introduced them to the coaches, Conor McGregor and Urijah Faber.
- The preliminary fights began:

USA – Ryan Hall defeated Johnny Nuñez via submission (heel hook) in the first round.
Europe – David Teymur defeated Thibault Gouti via unanimous decision after two rounds.
USA – Thanh Le defeated Andres Quintana via KO (punch) in the second round.
Europe – Mehdi Baghdad defeated Artem Lobov via majority decision after two rounds.
USA – Julian Erosa defeated Jason Soares via unanimous decision after two rounds.
Europe – Saul Rogers defeated Paulo Boer via submission (rear-naked choke) in the second round.
USA – Billy Quarantillo defeated Brandon Ricetti via TKO (punches) in the second round.
Europe – Frantz Slioa defeated Martin Delaney via submission (rear-naked choke) in the first round.
USA – Jason Gonzaléz defeated Tim Welch via TKO (punches) in the second round.
Europe – Abner Lloveras defeated Vlado Sikic via verbal submission (shoulder injury) in the first round.
USA – Tom Gallicchio defeated Mike Flach via submission (rear-naked choke) in the first round.
Europe – Martin Svensson defeated Mohamed Gabinski via unanimous decision after three rounds.
Europe – Marcin Wrzosek defeated Djamil Chan via submission (rear-naked choke) in the first round.
Europe – Sascha Sharma defeated Sean Carter via unanimous decision after two rounds.
USA – Chris Gruetzemacher defeated Austin Springer via TKO (strikes) in the second round.
USA – James Jenkins defeated Brennan Sevin via unanimous decision after two rounds.

- Dana White reminds the fighters that the winning fighter and coach will get a Harley Davidson motorcycle.
- White kicked off the tournament by flipping a coin to determine which team will pick the first fight. Team Faber wins the coin toss and will have control of fight selection on the next episode.

Episode 2: Crowded House (September 16, 2015)

- Coaches McGregor and Faber meet with their respective teams. McGregor says he doesn't feel a responsibility to coach anyone, but rather provide the team with the best mental and physical conditions possible to win fights. Faber takes a different approach than McGregor. He plans to be more hands-on and says everyone on the team must contribute in order to find successful results.
- Dana White visits gym and reveals each coach will be granted the opportunity to bring one fighter back who was eliminated during the entry round of fights to make the “TUF 22” cast. Coach McGregor unsurprisingly selects current training partner Artem Lobov, while Faber selects Johnny Nuñez. White also announces that with two new athletes joining the show, there will be nine quarter-finalists instead of the usual eight. As a result, one winning fighter whom White determines has the worst performance in victory will not move to the next round.
- Ryan Hall defeated Frantz Slioa via submission (heel hook) in the first round.
- Faber announces the next fight: Chris Gruetzemacher vs. Sascha Sharma.

Episode 3: Recognize the Enemy (September 23, 2015)

- UFC President Dana White tried to explain McGregor's unique approach to coaching his team. He doesn't show up for the morning sessions, which focuses on light training. However, McGregor always arrives for the evening session, which focuses on technique.
- The Team Faber coaches and fighters then have a night of relaxation where they watch T.J. Dillashaw's UFC on Fox 16 bout against Renan Barão. Dillashaw defended his UFC Bantamweight Championship at the event.
- Prior to the official weigh-ins for the Sharma/Gruetzmacher bout, McGregor and Faber have a conversation about Dillashaw's fight. McGregor says Faber should fight Dillashaw even though they are teammates. He says Dillashaw is “the only fight for you.” Faber indicates that he is not interested in the fight, but McGregor continues to pester him over the situation.
- Chris Gruetzemacher defeated Sascha Sharma via unanimous decision after three rounds.
- Faber announces the next fight: Tom Gallicchio vs. Marcin Wrzosek.

Episode 4: A Faithless Foe (September 30, 2015)

- McGregor and Faber exchange words outside the dressing rooms and Faber tells McGregor that he should attend all team practices if he's going to be so angry about fight results. The coaches exchange words but McGregor remains firm in his stance that his role is not to babysit the athletes.
- At the next Team McGregor training session, McGregor begins to change his mind on his approach to coaching. He indicates he can't help but become emotionally invested in the fights.
- Team Faber's Johnny Nuñez, who was selected as one of the returning fighters after being defeated in the elimination round, decides to skip practice. Faber expresses frustration in the athlete at the evening training session.
- Marcin Wrzosek defeated Tom Gallicchio via unanimous decision after two rounds.
- McGregor announces the next fight: Saul Rogers vs. Billy Quarantillo.

Episode 5: Just Do Something (October 7, 2015)

- The fighters return to the "TUF" house, and Team Faber's Tom Gallicchio is upset with his loss to Marcin Wrzosek on the previous episode. The 10-year veteran says he's tired of disappointments and setbacks, and he begins to question his future.
- Coaches and fighters from both teams enjoy some relaxation time outside of the house. They travel to a Las Vegas restaurant for dinner and drinks. The fighters are grateful for the bonding time with the coaches outside of a training environment.
- Team Faber's Chris Gruetzemacher begins to show signs of a succumbing to the pressure of the competition. Despite earning a victory in his opening-round fight, Gruetzemacher shares frustration with living in the house. He says he's not comfortable with the training tactics or the members of his team.
- Saul Rogers defeated Billy Quarantillo via unanimous decision after two rounds.
- McGregor announces the next fight: Mehdi Baghdad vs. Julian Erosa.

Episode 6: Snake in the Grass (October 21, 2015)

- Team Faber has a guest trainer as Julian Erosa finalizes his preparation. UFC bantamweight champion and “TUF 14” runner-up T.J. Dillashaw joins the Team Faber coaching staff to help provide guidance and share knowledge with the athletes.
- Faber explains his relationship with Dillashaw and the well-publicized riff with former head trainer Duane Ludwig and Team Alpha Male. Dana White discusses McGregor's pestering of Faber about the situation over the course of the season, and Dillashaw believes a confrontation with McGregor is bound to occur.
- McGregor, Faber and Cody Garbrandt engage in an argument over the Dillashaw situation. McGregor states that T.J. is simply appearing on the show to better his own interests. He goes on to predict TJ's apparent departure from Team Alpha Male, some months later. When Conor continues to press the issue, a member of Faber's team attempts to speak up. Conor challenges him to "do something" about it, when Garbrandt engages and proceeds to push him. Conor does not budge and a skirmish erupts between both teams. The fighters eventually calm down and the teams separate. Dillashaw arrives and McGregor confronts him about his relationship with Ludwig. T.J. simply has no real response back.
- Julian Erosa defeated Mehdi Baghdad via majority decision after two rounds.
- Faber announces the next fight: Thanh Le vs. Martin Svensson.

Episode 7: Mental Breakdown (November 4, 2015)

- After a disagreement on who had the most boring fight between the two, Team Faber members Chris Gruetzemacher and Julian Erosa get into a heated argument that leads to a drunken confrontation at the "TUF" house. This causes the rest of their teammates and the Team McGregor members to break it up before it gets physical.
- In order to dress up like McGregor for the fight, as a joke, Faber takes his team to the local thrift store to buy cheesy clothes at a fraction of the cost to McGregor's highly expensive fancy threads.
- Martin Svensson defeated Thanh Le via submission (rear-naked choke) in the second round.
- McGregor announces the next fight: James Jenkins vs. Artem Lobov.

Episode 8: Heart Is not Enough (November 11, 2015)

- Artem Lobov defeated James Jenkins via TKO (punches) in the first round.
- David Teymur defeated Johnny Nuñez via unanimous decision after three rounds.
- McGregor announces the final fight: Abner Lloveras vs. Jason Gonzaléz.

Episode 9: Bullseye (November 18, 2015)

- Faber and McGregor compete in this season's coaches challenge; a target game consisting of dropping watermelons off a helicopter. Faber wins the challenge much to the dismay of McGregor.
- Abner Lloveras defeated Jason Gonzaléz via unanimous decision after two rounds.
- Before the quarter-final match-ups are announced, Chris Gruetzemacher is the winning preliminary fighter chosen not to advance to the quarter-finals.
- The quarter final match-ups are announced as:

- Artem Lobov vs. Martin Svensson
- Saul Rogers vs. Ryan Hall
- Marcin Wrzosek vs. David Teymur
- Abner Lloveras vs. Julian Erosa

Episode 10: Nice and Flowy (November 25, 2015)

- After chosen not to advance to the quarter-finals, Chris Gruetzemacher gets a second chance when Martin Svensson's elbow is sore from his last fight against Thanh Le's kimura attempt. He goes to the doctor and an MRI showed his elbow is broken and he is eliminated from the show.
- Dana throws the fighters a pool party at the "TUF" house for having exciting performances this season, and to relax, recharge and have fun.
- Artem Lobov defeated Chris Gruetzemacher via KO (punches) in the second round.
- Saul Rogers defeated Ryan Hall via majority decision after two rounds.

Episode 11: Bone on Bone (December 2, 2015)

- Marcin Wrzosek defeated David Teymur via majority decision after two rounds.
- Julian Erosa defeated Abner Lloveras via split decision after three rounds.
- After the fight, Artem Lobov calls out Julian Erosa, believing Erosa was "gifted" two decisions and asks Dana White to make this fight happen next.
- The semi-final match-ups are announced as:

- Saul Rogers vs. Marcin Wrzosek
- Artem Lobov vs. Julian Erosa

Episode 12: Here For Myself (December 9, 2015)

- Saul Rogers defeated Marcin Wrzosek via submission (rear-naked choke) in the second round.
- UFC Featherweight champion José Aldo visits the TUF gym to train Team Faber, showing the fighters pointers with their Brazilian jiu-jitsu.
- Artem Lobov defeated Julian Erosa via KO (punches) in the first round.
- A fast forward interview with Dana White reveals that Saul Rogers lied during his visa application and had problems getting into the United States again. Therefore, he was pulled from the finale and replaced by Ryan Hall.
- Conor McGregor squares up with José Aldo after he turned up to assist Team Faber in their training.

== Tournament results ==
=== Elimination round ===
Team USA	Team Europe	Method	Round
Ryan Hall	Frantz Slioa	SUB	1
Chris Gruetzemacher	Sascha Sharma	UD	3
Tom Gallicchio	Marcin Wrzosek	UD	2
Billy Quarantillo	Saul Rogers	UD	2
Julian Erosa	Mehdi Baghdad	MD	2
Thanh Le	Martin Svensson	SUB	2
James Jenkins	Artem Lobov	TKO	1
Johnny Nuñez	David Teymur	UD	3
Jason Gonzalez	Abner Lloveras	UD	2

=== Tournament bracket ===
Quarter-finals
Saul Rogers	MD
Ryan Hall	2
Marcin Wrzosek	MD
David Teymur	2
Artem Lobov	KO
Chris Gruetzemacher*	2
Julian Erosa	SD
Abner Lloveras	3

Semi-finals
Saul Rogers	SUB
Marcin Wrzosek	2
Artem Lobov	KO
Julian Erosa	1

Finale
Ryan Hall**	UD
Artem Lobov	3

* Martin Svensson was originally scheduled to face Artem Lobov, but pulled out of the fight on episode 10 due to a broken elbow. He was replaced by Chris Gruetzemacher, who was the winning preliminary fighter chosen not to advance to the quarter-finals.

** After the conclusion of the season, it was revealed that Rogers was pulled from the tournament finale due to visa issues. He was replaced by Ryan Hall.

Legend
	Team McGregor
	Team Faber
UD	Unanimous Decision
MD	Majority Decision
SD	Split Decision
SUB	Submission
(T) KO	(Technical) Knockout

== The Ultimate Fighter 22 Finale ==
The Ultimate Fighter: Team McGregor vs. Team Faber Finale
- The poster for The Ultimate Fighter: Team McGregor vs. Team Faber Finale
- Promotion: Ultimate Fighting Championship
- Date: December 11, 2015
- Venue: The Chelsea at The Cosmopolitan
- City: Las Vegas, Nevada
- Attendance: 1,800
- Total gate: $450,000

Event chronology
UFC Fight Night: Namajunas vs. VanZant	The Ultimate Fighter: Team McGregor vs. Team Faber Finale	UFC 194: Aldo vs. McGregor

The Ultimate Fighter: Team McGregor vs. Team Faber Finale (also known as The Ultimate Fighter 22 Finale) was a mixed martial arts event held on December 11, 2015, at The Chelsea at The Cosmopolitan in Las Vegas, Nevada.

=== Background ===
The event was headlined by a featherweight bout between former UFC Lightweight champion Frankie Edgar and three-time title challenger Chad Mendes.

Khabib Nurmagomedov was expected to face Tony Ferguson at the event. However, Nurmagomedov pulled out of the fight on October 30 due to a rib injury and was replaced by Edson Barboza.

Mirsad Bektic was expected to face Tatsuya Kawajiri at the event. However, Bektic pulled out of the fight on November 27 citing injury. He was replaced by promotional newcomer Jason Knight.

Justin Scoggins was expected to face Joby Sanchez at this event. However, Scoggins was forced to pull out due to injury and was replaced by Geane Herrera.

Saul Rogers was expected to face Artem Lobov in the Lightweight final of this season. However, Rogers was not allowed to participate after it was discovered that he had falsified information on his visa application, restricting his travel to the United States. In turn, Rogers was replaced by fellow cast member Ryan Hall. Subsequently, the event will be the second to feature two fighters who had previously been eliminated from the competition to reach the finals, the first being The Ultimate Fighter 11. It was later announced that the UFC decided to cut Rogers from the organization due to the incident.

On February 10, it was announced that Konstantin Erokhin tested positive for drostanolone in a pre-fight, in-competition test. The test was administered by the Nevada State Athletic Commission (NSAC), not a test administered by USADA. On March 23, the NSAC announced he was suspended for 12 months and fined $3,300 retroactive to the date fight.

=== Results ===
Main Card (Fox Sports 1)
Weight class				Method	Round	Time	Notes
Featherweight	Frankie Edgar	def.	Chad Mendes	KO (punch)	1	2:28
Lightweight	Ryan Hall	def.	Artem Lobov	Decision (unanimous) (30–27, 30–26, 30–26)	3	5:00	(Note: The Ultimate Fighter: Team McGregor vs. Team Faber Finale)
Lightweight	Tony Ferguson	def.	Edson Barboza	Submission (D'Arce choke)	2	2:54	(Note: Ferguson was deducted one point in round one due to an illegal upkick.)
Lightweight	Evan Dunham	def.	Joe Lauzon	Decision (unanimous) (30–26, 30–27, 30–26)	3	5:00
Featherweight	Tatsuya Kawajiri	def.	Jason Knight	Decision (unanimous) (30–27, 30–27, 30–27)	3	5:00
Lightweight	Julian Erosa	def.	Marcin Wrzosek	Decision (split) (28–29, 29–28, 29–28)	3	5:00
Preliminary Card (Fox Sports 1)
Heavyweight	Gabriel Gonzaga	def.	Konstantin Erokhin	Decision (unanimous) (30–27, 30–27, 30–28)	3	5:00
Welterweight	Ryan LaFlare	def.	Mike Pierce	Decision (unanimous) (30–27, 29–28, 29–28)	3	5:00
Flyweight	Geane Herrera	def.	Joby Sanchez	TKO (punches)	2	4:28
Lightweight	Chris Gruetzemacher	def.	Abner Lloveras	Decision (unanimous) (29–28, 29–28, 29–28)	3	5:00

=== Bonus awards ===
The following fighters were awarded $50,000 bonuses:

- Fight of the Night: Tony Ferguson vs. Edson Barboza
- Performance of the Night: Frankie Edgar and Tony Ferguson

== Reported payout ==
The following is the reported payout to the fighters as reported to the Nevada State Athletic Commission. It does not include sponsor money and also does not include the UFC's traditional "fight night" bonuses.

- Frankie Edgar: $360,000 (includes $180,000 win bonus) def. Chad Mendes: $82,000
- Ryan Hall: $20,000 (includes $10,000 win bonus) def. Artem Lobov: $10,000
- Tony Ferguson: $100,000 (includes $50,000 win bonus) def. Edson Barboza: $44,000
- Evan Dunham: $68,000 (includes $34,000 win bonus) def. Joe Lauzon: $54,000
- Tatsuya Kawajiri: $52,000 (includes $21,000 win bonus) def. Jason Knight: $12,000
- Julian Erosa: $20,000 (includes $10,000 win bonus) def. Marcin Wrozsek: $10,000
- Gabriel Gonzaga: $76,000 (includes $38,000 win bonus) def. Konstantin Erokhin: $10,000
- Ryan LaFlare: $36,000 (includes $18,000 win bonus) def. Mike Pierce: $34,000
- Gean Herrera: $20,000 (includes $10,000 win bonus) def. Joby Sanchez: $10,000
- Chris Gruetzemacher: $20,000 (includes $10,000 win bonus) def. Abner Lloveras: $10,000

== See also ==
- The Ultimate Fighter
- List of current UFC fighters
- List of UFC events
- 2015 in UFC
