= Firas Zahabi =

Canadian martial arts coach

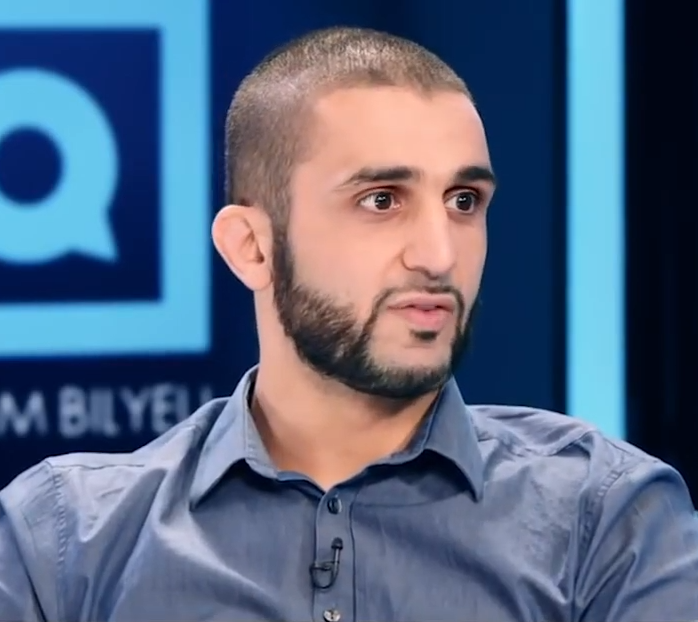
- Zahabi in 2021
- Born: 5 February 1980 (age 46); Quebec, Canada
- Team: Tristar Gym
- Rank: Black belt in BJJ under John Danaher

Other information
- Occupation: Owner and head trainer of Tristar Gym
- University: Concordia University
- Notable relatives: Aiemann Zahabi
- Notable students: Georges St-Pierre

Firas Zahabi (born 5 February 1980) is a Canadian martial artist who is the owner and head coach at Tristar Gym. Zahabi is known for his work with mixed martial artist Georges St-Pierre.

== Early life ==
Zahabi was born on 5 February 1980, in Quebec, Canada. His parents are Lebanese Immigrants.

Growing up, Zahabi and his brothers were mainly interested in American football. Zahabi was not exposed to martial arts until 1998, when he was aged 18. Zahabi became interested in martial arts after watching UFC 2 where Royce Gracie defeated all his opponents using Brazilian jiu-jitsu (BJJ).

Zahabi attended Concordia University where he graduated with a degree in philosophy with a specialization in the Ancient Greeks.

== Martial arts career ==
In 2000, Zahabi joined Tristar Gym where he trained in BJJ and Muay Thai. After just six months, Zahabi earned a Blue Belt in BJJ and became a part-time coach at the gym.

A few years later, Zahabi met John Danaher and would frequently make trips to Renzo Gracie Academy in New York City to train with him. In 2011, Zahabi received his Black Belt in BJJ from Danaher himself.

Because Zahabi was studying at University, he was not able to compete extensively. Nonetheless, he became a Canadian Amateur Muay Thai Champion and also won a few provincial-level grappling competitions. He also fought in some amateur unregulated mixed martial arts bouts. The organization where Zahabi became champion was called Full-Contact Jiu-Jitsu .

== Coaching career ==
In 2007, Conrad Pla the owner of Tristar Gym became too busy to run the gym so he handed it over to Zahabi to run. In 2008, the gym was sold to Zahabi and he became the new owner.

Zahabi has since then trained many different fighters under Tristar Gym. His coaching style is focused on technique in a very controlled manner. Fighters will not go all-out during training sessions as he considers it not an effective way to train as recovery is considered important.

Zahabi's most notable student is Georges St-Pierre. The two of them met when they were amateur fighters. After becoming champion, Zahabi decided to become a coach to St-Pierre. After UFC 69 where St-Pierre lost the UFC Welterweight title to Matt Serra, Zahabi became St-Pierre's main coach for the rest of his career.

In April 2021, Zahabi was involved in an incident involving the Montreal Police. Due to the COVID-19 pandemic, the police would regularly visit Tristar Gym to verify it was conforming to public health regulations. After sixteen visits in the past year, on 9 April, Zahabi refused to allow the police to come in for the third time on that day. As a result, the police waited outside the gym for hours until the issue was eventually resolved between the two parties.

== MMA commentary and television ==
Zahabi and UFC hall of famer Stephan Bonnar provided the commentary for all Titan FC events broadcast by CBS Sports in 2014.

Zahabi was the MMA coach on The Ultimate Fighter: Team GSP vs. Team Koscheck, of the UFC‐produced reality television series The Ultimate Fighter.

== Personal life ==
=== Family ===
Zahabi is the older brother of UFC bantamweight fighter Aiemann Zahabi.

Zahabi is married to Melissa Gendron who he met during university. They have three children which include two sons and one daughter.

=== Religion ===
Zahabi is a Muslim and has talked on podcasts about Islamic philosophy and polemics. Zahabi has been criticized for the fact that he refuses to train with women in Brazilian jiu-jitsu for religious reasons.

== Instructor lineage ==
Kano Jigoro → Tomita Tsunejiro → Mitsuyo Maeda → Carlos Gracie, Sr. → Helio Gracie → Rolls Gracie → Carlos Gracie, Jr. → Renzo Gracie → John Danaher → Firas Zahabi

== Notable fighters trained ==
- Georges St-Pierre - Former UFC Middleweight Champion, Former UFC Welterweight Champion, UFC Hall of Fame
- Robert Whittaker - Former UFC Middleweight Champion
- Vitor Belfort - Former UFC Light Heavyweight Champion
- Rory MacDonald - Former Bellator Welterweight champion, Former UFC Welterweight Title Challenger
- Miguel Torres - Former WEC Bantamweight Champion
- Kenny Florian - Former UFC 2-Time Lightweight and Featherweight Title Challenger
- David Loiseau - Former UFC Middleweight Title Contender
- Denis Kang - 2006 Pride Welterweight Grand Prix Runner-up
- Arnold Allen - (UFC)
- Aiemann Zahabi - (UFC)
- Nasrat Haqparast - (UFC)

== See also ==
- Tristar Gym
