= Abner Lloveras =

Catalan mixed martial arts fighter

- Born: September 4, 1982 (age 44); Barcelona, Spain
- Other names: Skullman
- Nationality: Spanish
- Height: 5 ft 11 in (1.80 m)
- Weight: 155 lb (70 kg; 11.1 st)
- Division: Lightweight
- Stance: Orthodox
- Fighting out of: Ludlow, Massachusetts, U.S. Barcelona, Catalonia
- Team: Team Link
- Trainer: Marco Alvan; Gabriel Gonzaga
- Rank: Brown belt in Brazilian Jiu-Jitsu
- Years active: 2004-present

Mixed martial arts record
- Total: 40
- Wins: 22
- By knockout: 8
- By submission: 6
- By decision: 8
- Losses: 17
- By knockout: 7
- By submission: 2
- By decision: 8
- Draws: 1

Other information
- Mixed martial arts record from Sherdog

Abner Lloveras Hernández (born September 4, 1982, in Barcelona) is a Spanish professional mixed martial artist in the lightweight division. Abner received a gold medal in the Spanish Olympic boxing tournament in 2010. He also competed on The Ultimate Fighter: Team McGregor vs. Team Faber.

== Biography ==
Lloveras was born on September 4, 1982, in Barcelona, Spain . At the age of 17, Lloveras began practicing martial arts, primarily kickboxing . At the age of 20, Lloveras moved to London, England, where he went on to train boxing at the All Stars. While he was training in boxing, Lloveras accepted the challenge of learning jiu-jitsu and, very soon after, at the age of 21, he made his MMA debut at the UKMMAC 8 event in August 2004.

== Boxing career ==
In his career as a boxer, Lloveras has had about 30 amateur bouts, of which he has only lost one. He participated for 3 years in the Spanish Olympic Boxing Championship, where he won the gold medal 3 times, and also participated in the Pre-Olympic Qualifying Tournament in Turkey for the London Olympics .

In 2014 he won the gold medal at the United Arab Emirates National Championship, during the period he lived in Dubai.

== Mixed martial arts career ==
=== Early career ===
Lloveras made his professional MMA debut in August 2004 with the UK Mixed Martial Arts Championship promotion in England. Over the next decade, he would compete for a variety of promotions – including Shooto and M-1 Global – as he amassed a record of 19 wins against 7 losses. One of Lloveras most notable bouts during this period was with UFC fighter Phillipe Nover.

=== The Ultimate Fighter ===
On August 31, 2015, it was announced that Lloveras would be a contestant on the 22nd season of The Ultimate Fighter reality show. In the elimination round, he defeated Vlado Sikic by verbal submission due to a shoulder injury. In the preliminary round, he defeated Jason Gonzalez by unanimous decision. In the quarterfinals, Lloveras lost to Julian Erosa on a split decision.

=== Ultimate Fighting Championship ===
Lloveras faced fellow cast member Chris Gruetzemacher at the TUF 22 Finale on December 11, 2015. On a fairly competitive three rounds, with Abner almost finishing the fight with a standing rear-naked choke, he lost the bout by unanimous decision and was subsequently released from the promotion.

=== Post-UFC ===
On June 25, 2016, Lloveras faced UFC veteran Andre Winner on June 25, 2016, for the SHC interim welterweight title, in Geneva. Unfortunately he lost by a split decision. However, he bounced back on September 26, 2016, when he defeated Maxim Maryanchuk with a body kick KO at ADW: Road to Abu Dhabi 4 in Sofia, Bulgaria. He continued this winning streak on September 23, 2017, against Davy Gallon in Barcelona, Spain, during the Arnold Fighters/Titan Channel: War of Titans, taking the victory with a KO punch in the third round. Yet, the tide turned again on March 10, 2018, when Farès Ziam defeated him with a swift KO punch just 24 seconds into the second round at the Hit Fighting Championship 5 in Horgen, Switzerland. He responded to this setback with a strong performance on September 29, 2018, securing a TKO victory over Alessandro Botti at Italian Cage Fighting 4 in Milan, Italy. Unfortunately, a series of losses followed. First was a unanimous decision loss to Jim Wallhead at Bellator: Newcastle on February 9, 2019. Then, on March 12, 2022, he succumbed to Thibault Gouti via first-round TKO in Madrid, Spain, during War of Titans 2. His next bout was on December 17, 2022, where he suffered a unanimous decision defeat against Jason Ponet at MMA GP Bordeaux in Bordeaux, France.

== Championships and accomplishments ==
=== Mixed martial arts ===
- Respect Fighting Championship
  - Respect Lightweight Championship (One time; current)

2015 best MMA fight by GNP MAGAZINE in Europe

=== Kickboxing ===
- Kickboxing Spain
  - Amateur champion (2005)

=== Boxing ===
- Boxing Spain
  - Spain champion (2010, 2011 and 2012)

== Mixed martial arts record ==
Professional record breakdown
40 matches	22 wins	17 losses
By knockout	8	7
By submission	6	2
By decision	8	8
Draws	1	

Res.	Record	Opponent	Method	Event	Date	Round	Time	Location	Notes
Loss	22–17–1	Samuel Blasco	TKO (elbows and punches)	Dogfight Wild Tournament 4: Tokyo Blood	May 23, 2026	1	7:50	Madrid, Spain	Bare knuckle MMA.
Loss	22–16–1	Henri Lintula	TKO (punches)	Immun Fight Club 1	Mar 21, 2026	1	4:38	Helsinki, Finland	
Loss	22–15–1	Leonardo Damiani	TKO (punches)	Ansgar Fighting League 34	May 25, 2024	2	3:57	Badalona, Spain	
Loss	22–14–1	Mindaugas Veržbickas	Submission (D'Arce choke)	Blade Fights 1	February 4, 2023	3	1:45	Kaunas, Lithuania	
Loss	22–13–1	Jason Ponet	Decision (unanimous)	MMA GP Bordeaux	December 17, 2022	3	5:00	Bordeaux, France	
Loss	22–12–1	Thibault Gouti	TKO (punches)	War of Titans 2	March 12, 2022	1	2:49	Madrid, Spain	Catchweight (165 lb) bout.
Loss	22–11–1	Jim Wallhead	Decision (unanimous)	Bellator Newcastle	February 9, 2019	3	5:00	Newcastle upon Tyne, England	
Win	22–10–1	Alessandro Botti	TKO (punches)	Italian Cage Fighting 4	September 29, 2018	1	3:46	Milan, Italy	
Loss	21–10–1	Farès Ziam	KO (punch)	Hit Fighting Championship 5	March 10, 2018	2	0:24	Horgen, Switzerland	
Win	21–9–1	Davy Gallon	KO (punch)	Arnold Fighters/Titan Channel: War of Titans	September 23, 2017	3	3:44	Barcelona, Spain	
Win	20–9–1	Maxim Maryanchuk	KO (kick to the body)	ADW: Road to Abu Dhabi 4	September 26, 2016	2	4:18	Sofia, Bulgaria	
Loss	19–9–1	Andre Winner	Decision (split)	SHC 11	June 25, 2016	3	5:00	Geneva, Switzerland	
Loss	19–8–1	Chris Gruetzemacher	Decision (unanimous)	The Ultimate Fighter: Team McGregor vs. Team Faber Finale	December 11, 2015	3	5:00	Las Vegas, Nevada, United States	
Win	19–7–1	Nordin Asrih	Decision (unanimous)	Respect FC 12	April 11, 2015	5	5:00	Wuppertal, Germany	Won the vacant Respect Lightweight Championship.
Win	18–7–1	Jonas Boeno do Rosario	Decision (unanimous)	Ansgar Fighting League 2	November 29, 2014	3	5:00	Fuenlabrada, Spain	
Win	17–7–1	Miguel Valverde	Submission (guillotine choke)	International Fighting Championship	July 25, 2014	1	1:09	Badalona, Spain	
Win	16–7–1	Pierre Chretien	Submission (guillotine choke)	Ansgar Fighting League 1	May 10, 2014	1	1:05	Barcelona, Spain	
Loss	15–7–1	Mike Campbell	Decision (unanimous)	CES MMA: Undisputed 2	February 1, 2013	5	5:00	Lincoln, Rhode Island, United States	For the inaugural CES Lightweight Championship.
Win	15–6–1	Ryan Quinn	Decision (unanimous)	CES MMA: Proving Grounds	June 15, 2012	3	5:00	Lincoln, Rhode Island, United States	
Win	14–6–1	Rich Moskowitz	Decision (unanimous)	Premier Fighting Championship 7	December 3, 2011	3	5:00	Amherst, Massachusetts, United States	
Win	13–6–1	Ralph Johnson	Submission (armbar)	Paul Vandale Promotions: The Beast Comes East	May 20, 2011	1	2:49	Worcester, Massachusetts, United States	
Loss	12–6–1	Shamil Zavurov	TKO (punches)	M-1 Challenge 22: Narkun vs. Vasilevsky	December 10, 2010	4	4:22	Moscow, Russia	For the vacant M-1 Global Welterweight Championship.
Win	12–5–1	Danny Covin	TKO (punches)	Hombres de Honor 15	November 20, 2010	2	0:49	Barcelona, Spain	
Win	11–5–1	Berrie Bunthof	KO (punch)	M-1 Selection 2010: Eastern Europe Finals	July 22, 2010	1	3:23	Moscow, Russia	
Win	10–5–1	Miljan Jaksic	Submission (rear-naked choke)	M-1 Selection 2010: Western Europe Round 3	May 29, 2010	1	4:20	Helsinki, Finland	
Loss	9–5–1	Leandro Frois Lopes	Decision (unanimous)	Fight 4 Life	March 27, 2010	3	5:00	Barcelona, Spain	
Win	9–4–1	Sunnat Ilyasov	KO (knees and punches)	M-1 Selection 2010: Western Europe Round 1	February 5, 2010	2	1:18	Hilversum, Netherlands	
Win	8–4–1	Luiz Andrade I	Decision (unanimous)	M-1 Challenge 18: Netherlands Day Two	August 16, 2009	2	5:00	Hilversum, Netherlands	
Win	7–4–1	Gael Grimaud	Decision (split)	M-1 Challenge 14: Japan	April 29, 2009	3	5:00	Tokyo, Japan	
Win	6–4–1	Carlos Valeri	KO (punches)	Almogavers 1	March 22, 2009	2	0:24	Barcelona, Spain	
Loss	5–4–1	Erik Oganov	Decision	M-1 MFC: Battle on the Neva	July 21, 2007	3	5:00	Saint Petersburg, Russia	
Win	5–3–1	Ramon Diaz	Decision (unanimous)	Hummer Man Fight 1	April 14, 2007	3	N/A	Guadalajara, Spain	
Win	4–3–1	Lola Bamgbala	Submission (kimura)	UKMMAC 17: Iron Circle	November 26, 2006	1	N/A	England	
Loss	3–3–1	Phillipe Nover	Decision (majority)	ROC 12 - Tournament of Champions Quarterfinals	November 17, 2006	2	5:00	Atlantic City, New Jersey, United States	
Win	3–2–1	Marius Doczi	Decision (unanimous)	Shooto - Spain	July 9, 2006	2	5:00	Spain	
Win	2–2–1	Marcos de Paulo	TKO (punches)	MMA Vitoria 1	April 8, 2006	1	3:40	Vitória, Brazil	
Loss	1–2–1	Oliver Jones	Submission (rear-naked choke)	Extreme Fighting 1	October 15, 2005	2	4:38	London, England	
Draw	1–1–1	Lola Bamgbala	Draw	UKMMAC 12: Brutal Beatdown	October 2, 2005	3	5:00	Essex, England	
Win	1–1	Tom Lowman	Submission (guillotine choke)	UKMMAC 10: Slugfest	March 6, 2005	1	4:45	Essex, England	
Loss	0–1	Darren Guisha	TKO (leg injury)	UKMMAC 8: Natural Force	August 22, 2004	3	3:59	Essex, England	

=== Mixed martial arts exhibition record ===
Exhibition record breakdown		
2 matches	2 wins	0 losses
By submission	1	0
By decision	1	0

Res.	Record	Opponent	Method	Event	Date	Round	Time	Location	Notes
Loss	2–1	Julian Erosa	Decision (split)	The Ultimate Fighter: Team McGregor vs. Team Faber	December 3, 2015 (airdate)	3	5:00	Las Vegas, Nevada, United States	TUF 22 quarter final.
Win	2–0	Jason Gonzalez	Decision (unanimous)	The Ultimate Fighter: Team McGregor vs. Team Faber	November 18, 2015 (airdate)	2	5:00	Las Vegas, Nevada, United States	TUF 22 preliminary round.
Win	1–0	Vlado Sikic	TKO (shoulder injury)	The Ultimate Fighter: Team McGregor vs. Team Faber	September 9, 2015 (airdate)	1	3:33	Las Vegas, Nevada, United States	TUF 22 elimination round.

Except where otherwise indicated, details provided in the record box are taken from Sherdog.
