= Conrad Pla =

Canadian actor and kickboxer (b. 1966)

- Born: October 24, 1966 (age 59); Madrid, Spain
- Occupations: Actor, kickboxer
- Martial arts career
- Division: Light heavyweight, super middleweight
- Style: Kickboxing; Muay Thai
- Fighting out of: Montreal, Quebec, Canada
- Team: Tristar Gym
- Years active: 1984-1998

Conrad Pla (born October 24, 1966) is a Spanish-born Canadian actor, martial artist, and former professional kickboxer. He competed as a light heavyweight and super middleweight between 1984 and 1998, and held both the ISKA North American and WKA Intercontinental championships. He is a co-founder of and trainer at Tristar Gym.

Since retiring from kickboxing, Pla has worked as a film and television actor, notably as Carlos Serrano on ReGenesis (2004–08), Sergeant Julien Houle on 19-2 (2014–17), and Colonel Janus on The Expanse (2017). He has also provided voiceover work for video games, notably the Assassin's Creed and Far Cry series.

== Early life ==
Pla was born in Madrid and moved to Canada with his parents at the age of three. Both of his parents were nuclear physicists. He began studying martial arts at the age of 14.

== Kickboxing career ==
Pla was a professional kickboxer between the ages of 18 and 32. He competed in the light heavyweight and super middleweight division. With 26 pro fights, he was ranked 3rd in the world, was the ISKA North American Champion as well as the WKA Intercontinental Champion. He fought Javier Mendez for the ISKA World title in Santa Cruz, California, in 1995 but lost a close split decision. He retired from active competition at the end of the decade due to injury.

Pla founded the Tristar Gym in 1991 together with Michel Lavallée and Ron Di Cecco. In 2001, the gym was sold to Alexandre Choko. He currently teaches kickboxing and Muay Thai in Montreal.

== Acting career ==
Following his retirement from kickboxing, Pla turned to acting, studying under Danielle Schneider and Ivana Chubbuck. He has had supporting roles in films such as 16 Blocks, The Terminal, Confessions of a Dangerous Mind, The Sum of All Fears, Jericho Mansions, Max Payne and Pawn Sacrifice. He was the male lead in the 2004 horror film Eternal.

In 2009, Pla was the writer and director for Burning Mussolini, in which he also acted opposite his friend and ReGenesis co-star Peter Outerbridge. In 2013, he had a supporting role in the film Riddick as Vargas. He also played the main antagonist of Assassin's Creed IV: Black Flag, Governor Laureano de Torres y Ayala. He also played the voicing of Jackal in Rainbow Six Siege. In 2017, Pla portrayed the science officer Colonel Janus over the course of five episodes of the space opera TV series, The Expanse. In 2021, Pla appeared in Ubisoft's Far Cry 6 as guerilla fighter Carlos Montero.

== Filmography ==
=== Film ===
Year	Title	Role	Notes
2001	Dead Awake	Veronica	
2002	Swindle	Cisco	
2002	The Sum of All Fears	Pentagon Security Guard	
2002	Steal	Officer	
2002	Nearest to Heaven	Bellboy	Uncredited
2002	Confessions of a Dangerous Mind	Large Man	Uncredited
2003	Chasing Holden	Cornish Pedestrian	
2003	Jericho Mansions	Cordero	
2004	The Terminal	CBP Officer	
2004	Eternal	Raymond Pope	
2006	16 Blocks	Ortiz	
2007	Imitation	Angel	
2008	Max Payne	Captain Bowen	
2009	Burning Mussolini	Paul Choquino	Also writer and director
2010	Casino Jack	Agent Hanley	
2011	Immortals	Jailer	
2012	The Factory	Steve	
2013	The Informant	Chauffeur	
2013	Riddick	Vargas	
2014	Pawn Sacrifice	Carmine Nigro	
2014	Wings of the Dragon	Slaven	
2018	The Hummingbird Project	Agent Santana	
2023	Evergreen$	Homeless Santa	
2023	Out Standing	Gaetan Perron	

=== Television ===
Year	Title	Role	Notes
2001	All Souls	Cardenza	Episode: "Bad Blood"
2001	No Ordinary Baby	Policeman	Television film
2001	Tracker	Victor	Episode: "Pilot"
2001	Relic Hunter	Brando	Episode: "Devil Doll"
2002	The Rendering	Ernesto	Television film
2002	Street Time	Paco Aviles	2 episodes
2002	Just a Walk in the Park	Girardo	Television film
2002	Odyssey 5	Paul Nieves	2 episodes
2002	Lathe of Heaven	Search Man	Television film
2002	Conviction	Trustee	Television film
2002	Mutant X	Valdex	Episode: "Power Play"
2002	Sue Thomas: F.B.Eye	Vince Toma	Episode: "The Signing"
2002	Big Wolf on Campus	Officer	Episode: "Switch Me Baby One More Time"
2003	Wicked Minds	Det. Mormino	Television film
2003	Wild Card	Ray Ramirez	Pilot episode
2003	Wall of Secrets	Diego	Television film
2004	False Pretenses	Nando	Television film
2004	The Wool Cap	Cop at Bar	Television film
2004–08	ReGenesis	Carlos Serrano	52 episodes
2005	Kevin Hill	Juan Fontez	2 episodes
2005	Kojak	Sergeant Mendoza	Episode: "Kind of Blue"
2006	Why I Wore Lipstick to My Mastectomy	Cuban Taxi Driver	Television film
2007	The Robber Bride	Sgt. Parker	Television film
2007	Lethal Obsession	George Friezen	Television film
2009	Flashpoint	Rafael Castillo	Episode: "Eagle Two"
2009	Hidden Crimes	Finn	Television film
2009	Guns	Detective Smith	2 episodes
2009	The Line	Sal Florio	15 episodes
2009	The Beautiful Life	Carlos Velora	Episode: "Pilot"
2009	The Border	Peter Romano	Episode: "The Dead"
2010	Tangled	Jacob	Television film
2010	Covert Affairs	Felix Artigas	Episode: "When the Levee Breaks"
2010	Durham County	Mitch Tanzy	Episode: "Family Day"
2011	Republic of Doyle	Robert Stanford	Episode: "Live and Let Doyle"
2011	King	Lucio Barrata	Episode: "T-Bone"
2011	XIII: The Series	Miguel Santos	Episode: "Lockdown"
2011	Alphas	Luke	Episode: "Bill and Gary's Excellent Adventure"
2012	The Firm	Manny Reyes	Episode: "Pilot"
2013	Nikita	Vasquez	Episode: "High-Value Target"
2013	The Listener	Carter O'Brien	Episode: "Caged In"
2014	Hell on Wheels	Jose Spano	Episode: "Life's a Mystery"
2014–17	19-2	Sergeant Julien Houle	22 episodes
2015	Dark Matter	Cain	2 episodes
2015	The Art of More	Mel Thomas	3 episodes
2015	Les Jeunes Loups	Pedro Diaz	Episode #2.7
2015–16	Rogue	Ordonez	5 episodes
2016	Suits	Ron Da'Mico	Episode: "Blowback"
2016	Pregnant at 17	Dom Sheridans	Television film
2016	Quantico	Agent Mike Alonzo	Episode: "Drive"
2017	The Expanse	Colonel Janus	5 episodes
2017	21 Thunder	Albert Rocas	7 episodes
2017	Star Trek: Discovery	Stone	Episode: "Context Is for Kings"
2018	Taken	El Major	Episode: "S.E.R.E."
2018	Frankie Drake Mysteries	Vernon Ashton	Episode: "Dealer's Choice"
2019	Pure	Octavio Orff	6 episodes
2019–present	Blood & Treasure	FBI Agent Harper	3 episodes
2021	Departure	Carlos Orega	2 episodes
2022	Transplant	Frank Brezina	Episode: "Roads"

=== Video games ===
Year	Title	Voice role
2012	Assassin's Creed III: Liberation	Diego Vásquez
2013	Assassin's Creed IV: Black Flag	Laureano de Torres y Ayala / Additional characters
2021	Far Cry 6	Carlos Montero
