= Julian Erosa =

American mixed martial arts fighter

- Born: Julian Ricardo Dulican Erosa; July 31, 1989 (age 37); Seattle, Washington, U.S.
- Other names: Juicy J
- Height: 6 ft 1 in (185 cm)
- Weight: 145 lb (66 kg; 10 st 5 lb)
- Division: Featherweight; Lightweight
- Reach: 74.5 in (189 cm)
- Fighting out of: Yakima, Washington, U.S.
- Team: Yakima MMA (2008–2017); Xtreme Couture (2017–present); 10th Planet Las Vegas (2017–present)
- Years active: 2010–2026

Mixed martial arts record
- Total: 45
- Wins: 32
- By knockout: 13
- By submission: 14
- By decision: 5
- Losses: 13
- By knockout: 8
- By decision: 5

Other information
- Mixed martial arts record from Sherdog

Julian Ricardo Dulican Erosa (born July 31, 1989) is an American former professional mixed martial artist. He competed in the Featherweight division of the Ultimate Fighting Championship. Erosa is also a former CageSport Featherweight and Lightweight Champion.

== Background ==
The son of Ricardo and Debbie Erosa, Julian was born in Seattle, Washington but moved to Yakima growing up. Julian has a younger brother, Ricky. Growing up Julian was an avid skateboarder and snowboarder. During his skateboarding years, he frequently got into fights and eventually drifted into mixed martial arts in his late teens. He graduated from Eisenhower High School and followed his mother's footsteps by studying accounting for a couple of years in Central Washington University before dropping out.

== Mixed martial arts career ==
=== Early career ===
After going 10–0 as an amateur, Erosa began his professional mixed martial arts career in 2010. He fought primarily in the Pacific Northwest region, mostly in the CageSport promotion. After racking up 7–0 record, he faced Ryan Mulvihill in a rematch for the vacant CageSport Featherweight Championship at CageSport 19 on April 28, 2012. He won the title but was not able to defend it in a match against Drew Brokenshire at CageSport 22 on December 1, 2012.

After losing the title, Erosa went 3–1 before receiving a title shot for the vacant CageSport (in a prevailing collaboration with Super Fight League) Lightweight Championship. He faced Harrison Bevens at SFL America 2 on December 13, 2014 and claimed the title via knockout. Subsequently, he was pitted against Drew Brokenshire in a rematch for the vacant CageSport Featherweight Championship at SFL America 3 on February 21, 2015. He avenged the previous loss and became simultaneous two-division champion via third-round submission.

=== The Ultimate Fighter ===
Erosa was then picked to be a part of The Ultimate Fighter: Team McGregor vs. Team Faber, in which he advanced from the preliminary fights by defeating Jason Soares via unanimous decision.

In the elimination round, Erosa faced Mehdi Baghdad. Erosa won the fight via majority decision, advancing into quarter-finals where he took on Abner Lloveras. Erosa advanced to the semi-finals via a split decision victory.

In the semi-finals Erosa met the season's would-be runner-up Artem Lobov. He was eliminated from the tournament via first-round knockout loss.

=== Ultimate Fighting Championship ===
Despite being eliminated from the tournament, Erosa signed a contract with the UFC and made his promotional debut against fellow The Ultimate Fighter alumni Marcin Wrzosek at The Ultimate Fighter: Team McGregor vs. Team Faber Finale on December 11, 2015. Erosa won the fight via split decision.

He would then face Teruto Ishihara at UFC 196 on March 5, 2016. Erosa lost the fight via second-round knockout and was subsequently released from the promotion.

=== Return to Cagesport and Other Organizations ===
After his release from the UFC, went on to fight at a variety of organizations, including Prime Fighting, where he would win the Featherweight title with a TKO win over Austin Springer, as well as losing to Paddy Pimblett in the Cage Warriors Featherweight title fight, in a highly controversial unanimous decision. He would then return to Cage Sports, where he would win back the Lightweight title and defend it again against Justin Harrington, before losing it in a TKO loss to Bobby McIntyre. He would have a one fight stint GKO, winning his only fight by TKO, before returning to Cagesports and winning back the Lightweight title against Bryan Nuro, in a unanimous decision. He would fight on Dana White's Contender Series 11, and although he won the fight against Jamall Emmers by knockout, he was not offered a UFC contract.

=== Return to UFC ===
Although he did not earn a direct contract after his DWCS fight, Erosa was signed to fight against fellow DWCS alumni Devonte Smith at UFC Fight Night 139. He lost the fight via knockout in round one.

Erosa faced Grant Dawson on March 9, 2019 at UFC Fight Night 146. He lost the fight via unanimous decision and was briefly released from the promotion.

Erosa was offered a quick return to face Julio Arce on May 18, 2019 at UFC Fight Night 151, despite being released from the promotion after the previous loss. He lost the fight via knockout in the third round and was released once again.

After the release, Erosa picked up one win in his native CageSport and was brought back as a late replacement for Kyle Nelson, who had visa issues, against Sean Woodson at UFC on ESPN 12. He won the fight via D'arce choke in the third round. This win earned him the Performance of the Night award.

Erosa faced Nate Landwehr on February 20, 2021 at UFC Fight Night 185. He won the fight via technical knockout in round one.

Erosa faced Seung Woo Choi on June 19, 2021 at UFC on ESPN 25. He lost the fight via knockout in the first round.

Erosa replaced Lerone Murphy on short notice against Charles Jourdain on September 4, 2021 at UFC Fight Night 191. He won the fight via a submission in round three.

Erosa faced Steven Peterson on February 5, 2022 at UFC Fight Night 200. At the weigh-ins, Peterson weighed in at 149 pounds, three pounds over the featherweight non-title fight limit. The bout proceeded at catchweight and Peterson was fined 30% of his purse, which will go to his opponent. Erosa won the fight via split decision. 13 out of 18 media scores gave it to Erosa. This fight earned him the Fight of the Night award and also Peterson's bonus due to his weight miss.

Erosa faced Hakeem Dawodu on September 10, 2022 at UFC 279. At the weigh-ins, Dawodu weighed in at 149.5 pounds, 3.5 pounds over the non-title featherweight limit. Dawodu was fined 30% of his purse, which will go to his opponent Erosa. Erosa won the fight via unanimous decision.

Erosa faced Alex Caceres on December 17, 2022, at UFC Fight Night 216. He lost the fight via technical knockout in round one.

Erosa faced Fernando Padilla on April 29, 2023, at UFC on ESPN 45. He lost the fight via technical knockout in round one.

Erosa faced Ricardo Ramos on March 23, 2024, at UFC on ESPN 53. He won the fight with a guillotine choke submission in the first round.

Erosa faced Christian Rodriguez on July 13, 2024, at UFC on ESPN 59. He won the fight again by a guillotine choke submission in the first round.

Erosa faced Darren Elkins on April 12, 2025 at UFC 314. He won the fight by technical knockout in the first round.

Erosa faced Melquizael Costa on May 17, 2025 at UFC Fight Night 256. He lost the fight by unanimous decision. This fight earned him another Fight of the Night award.

Erosa faced promotional newcomer Lerryan Douglas on March 28, 2026, at UFC Fight Night 271. He lost the fight by knockout in the first round.

In his retirement fight, Erosa faced Lee Jeong-yeong on October 31, 2026 at UFC Fight Night 292. He won the fight by knockout in the first round and subsequently retired from mixed martial arts competition. This fight earned him a $100,000 Performance of the Night award.

== Personal life ==
Erosa has been married to Alaina Evans since mid-2016. He is non-religious. His son was born on March 15, 2024.

== Championships and accomplishments ==
=== Mixed martial arts ===
- Ultimate Fighting Championship
  - Performance of the Night (Two times) vs. Sean Woodson and Lee Jeong-yeong
  - Fight of the Night (Two times) vs. Steven Peterson and Melquizael Costa
  - UFC.com Awards
    - 2020: Ranked #3 Upset of the Year vs. Sean Woodson
- CageSport
  - CageSport Featherweight Champion (two times)
  - CageSport Lightweight Champion (three times)
    - One title defense (second reign)
- Prime Fighting
  - Prime Fighting Featherweight Champion (one time)
- MMAjunkie.com
  - 2021 Submission of the Month vs. Charles Jourdain
- MMA Mania
  - 2025 #5 Ranked Fight of the Year vs. Melquizael Costa

== Mixed martial arts record ==
Professional record breakdown
45 matches	32 wins	13 losses
By knockout	13	8
By submission	14	0
By decision	5	5

Res.	Record	Opponent	Method	Event	Date	Round	Time	Location	Notes
Win	32–13	Lee Jeong-yeong	KO (punches)	UFC Fight Night: Moicano vs. Nolan	October 31, 2026	1	1:31	Las Vegas, Nevada, United States	Performance of the Night.
Loss	31–13	Lerryan Douglas	KO (punches)	UFC Fight Night: Adesanya vs. Pyfer	March 28, 2026	1	3:33	Seattle, Washington, United States	
Loss	31–12	Melquizael Costa	Decision (unanimous)	UFC Fight Night: Burns vs. Morales	May 17, 2025	3	5:00	Las Vegas, Nevada, United States	Fight of the Night.
Win	31–11	Darren Elkins	TKO (elbow and punches)	UFC 314	April 12, 2025	1	4:15	Miami, Florida, United States	
Win	30–11	Christian Rodriguez	Submission (guillotine choke)	UFC on ESPN: Namajunas vs. Cortez	July 13, 2024	1	4:49	Denver, Colorado, United States	
Win	29–11	Ricardo Ramos	Submission (guillotine choke)	UFC on ESPN: Ribas vs. Namajunas	March 23, 2024	1	2:15	Las Vegas, Nevada, United States	
Loss	28–11	Fernando Padilla	TKO (punches)	UFC on ESPN: Song vs. Simón	April 29, 2023	1	1:41	Las Vegas, Nevada, United States	
Loss	28–10	Alex Caceres	TKO (head kick and punches)	UFC Fight Night: Cannonier vs. Strickland	December 17, 2022	1	3:04	Las Vegas, Nevada, United States	
Win	28–9	Hakeem Dawodu	Decision (unanimous)	UFC 279	September 10, 2022	3	5:00	Las Vegas, Nevada, United States	Catchweight (149.5 lb) bout; Dawodu missed weight.
Win	27–9	Steven Peterson	Decision (split)	UFC Fight Night: Hermansson vs. Strickland	February 5, 2022	3	5:00	Las Vegas, Nevada, United States	Catchweight (149 lb) bout; Peterson missed weight. Fight of the Night.
Win	26–9	Charles Jourdain	Submission (brabo choke)	UFC Fight Night: Brunson vs. Till	September 4, 2021	3	2:56	Las Vegas, Nevada, United States	Catchweight (150 lb) bout.
Loss	25–9	Choi Seung-woo	KO (punches)	UFC on ESPN: The Korean Zombie vs. Ige	June 19, 2021	1	1:37	Las Vegas, Nevada, United States	
Win	25–8	Nate Landwehr	TKO (flying knee)	UFC Fight Night: Blaydes vs. Lewis	February 20, 2021	1	0:56	Las Vegas, Nevada, United States	
Win	24–8	Sean Woodson	Submission (brabo choke)	UFC on ESPN: Poirier vs. Hooker	June 27, 2020	3	2:44	Las Vegas, Nevada, United States	Catchweight (150 lb) bout. Performance of the Night.
Win	23–8	AJ Bryant	Submission (bulldog choke)	CageSport 60	February 22, 2020	1	4:43	Tacoma, Washington, United States	
Loss	22–8	Julio Arce	KO (head kick)	UFC Fight Night: dos Anjos vs. Lee	May 18, 2019	3	1:49	Rochester, New York, United States	
Loss	22–7	Grant Dawson	Decision (unanimous)	UFC Fight Night: Lewis vs. dos Santos	March 9, 2019	3	5:00	Wichita, Kansas, United States	Return to Featherweight.
Loss	22–6	Devonte Smith	KO (punches)	UFC Fight Night: The Korean Zombie vs. Rodríguez	November 10, 2018	1	0:46	Denver, Colorado, United States	
Win	22–5	Jamall Emmers	KO (head kick and punches)	Dana White's Contender Series 11	June 26, 2018	2	1:10	Las Vegas, Nevada, United States	Featherweight bout.
Win	21–5	Bryan Nuro	Decision (unanimous)	CageSport 48	December 16, 2017	5	5:00	Tacoma, Washington, United States	Won the CageSport Lightweight Championship.
Win	20–5	Erick Sánchez	TKO (punches)	Global Knockout 11	November 4, 2017	3	4:32	Jackson, California, United States	Featherweight bout.
Loss	19–5	Bobby McIntyre	TKO (punches)	CageSport 46	July 15, 2017	1	3:58	Tacoma, Washington, United States	Lost the CageSport Lightweight Championship.
Win	19–4	Justin Harrington	KO (knees and punches)	CageSport 45	April 22, 2017	1	4:09	Tacoma, Washington, United States	Defended the CageSport Lightweight Championship.
Win	18–4	Justin Harrington	Submission (triangle choke)	CageSport 44	February 25, 2017	1	2:23	Tacoma, Washington, United States	Won the CageSport Lightweight Championship.
Loss	17–4	Paddy Pimblett	Decision (unanimous)	Cage Warriors: Unplugged 1	November 12, 2016	5	5:00	London, England	For the Cage Warriors Featherweight Championship.
Win	17–3	Austin Springer	TKO (punches)	Prime Fighting 8	October 8, 2016	2	3:15	Ridgefield, Washington, United States	Won the Prime Fighting Featherweight Championship.
Win	16–3	Daniel Swain	TKO (doctor stoppage)	KOTC: Battle Zone	May 19, 2016	2	5:00	Worley, Idaho, United States	Catchweight (150 lb) bout.
Loss	15–3	Teruto Ishihara	KO (punches)	UFC 196	March 5, 2016	2	0:34	Las Vegas, Nevada, United States	
Win	15–2	Marcin Wrzosek	Decision (split)	The Ultimate Fighter: Team McGregor vs. Team Faber Finale	December 11, 2015	3	5:00	Las Vegas, Nevada, United States	Lightweight bout.
Win	14–2	Drew Brokenshire	Submission (brabo choke)	CageSport 34	February 21, 2015	3	4:35	Tacoma, Washington, United States	Won the CageSport Featherweight Championship.
Win	13–2	Harrison Bevens	KO (knee)	CageSport 33	December 13, 2014	2	2:10	Tacoma, Washington, United States	Won the vacant CageSport Lightweight Championship.
Win	12–2	Ryan Mulvihill	Submission (triangle choke)	KOTC: Seek and Destroy	May 22, 2014	2	4:19	Worley, Idaho, United States	Return to Lightweight.
Win	11–2	Mike Joy	TKO (punches)	CageSport 29	February 8, 2014	2	2:28	Tacoma, Washington, United States	Catchweight (150 lb) bout.
Loss	10–2	Lee Morrison	Decision (unanimous)	CageSport 25	July 6, 2013	3	5:00	Tacoma, Washington, United States	
Win	10–1	Jason Gybels	Submission (triangle choke)	CageSport 24	April 27, 2013	2	3:49	Tacoma, Washington, United States	Catchweight (150 lb) bout.
Loss	9–1	Drew Brokenshire	Decision (unanimous)	CageSport 22	December 1, 2012	5	5:00	Fife, Washington, United States	Lost the CageSport Featherweight Championship.
Win	9–0	Jason Gybels	KO (punch)	CageSport 21	September 29, 2012	1	4:36	Fife, Washington, United States	Lightweight bout.
Win	8–0	Ryan Mulvihill	Submission (armbar)	CageSport 19	April 28, 2012	4	1:48	Tacoma, Washington, United States	Featherweight debut. Won the CageSport Featherweight Championship.
Win	7–0	Jerome Jones	Submission (armbar)	CageSport 18	February 25, 2012	2	4:30	Tacoma, Washington, United States	
Win	6–0	Matt Coble	Submission (rear-naked choke)	CageSport 17	December 3, 2011	3	3:31	Tacoma, Washington, United States	
Win	5–0	Ernesto Toscano	Decision (unanimous)	CageSport 16	October 1, 2011	3	5:00	Tacoma, Washington, United States	
Win	4–0	John Martinez	TKO (punches)	Lords of the Cage 12	June 10, 2011	3	3:24	Yakima, Washington, United States	
Win	3–0	Ryan Mulvihill	Submission (brabo choke)	CageSport 14	April 23, 2011	2	1:23	Tacoma, Washington, United States	
Win	2–0	Omar Avelar	Submission (armbar)	CageSport 13	February 19, 2011	2	2:32	Tacoma, Washington, United States	
Win	1–0	Angel Diaz	KO (punches)	CageSport 12	October 2, 2010	1	2:16	Tacoma, Washington, United States	Lightweight debut.

Exhibition record breakdown		
4 matches	3 wins	1 loss
By knockout	0	1
By decision	3	0

Res.	Record	Opponent	Method	Event	Date	Round	Time	Location	Notes
Loss	3–1	Artem Lobov	TKO (punches)	The Ultimate Fighter: Team McGregor vs Team Faber	December 9, 2015	1	1:00	Las Vegas, Nevada, United States	TUF 22 Semifinal.
Win	3–0	Abner Lloveras	Decision (split)	The Ultimate Fighter: Team McGregor vs Team Faber	December 2, 2015	2	5:00	Las Vegas, Nevada, United States	TUF 22 Quarterfinal.
Win	2–0	Mehdi Baghdad	Decision (majority)	The Ultimate Fighter: Team McGregor vs Team Faber	October 21, 2015	2	5:00	Las Vegas, Nevada, United States	TUF 22 Elimination Round.
Win	1–0	Jason Soares	Decision (unanimous)	The Ultimate Fighter: Team McGregor vs Team Faber	September 9, 2015	2	5:00	Las Vegas, Nevada, United States	TUF 22 preliminary fight.

== See also ==
- List of Dana White's Contender Series alumni
- List of male mixed martial artists
