= Aiemann Zahabi =

Canadian mixed martial arts fighter (born 1987)

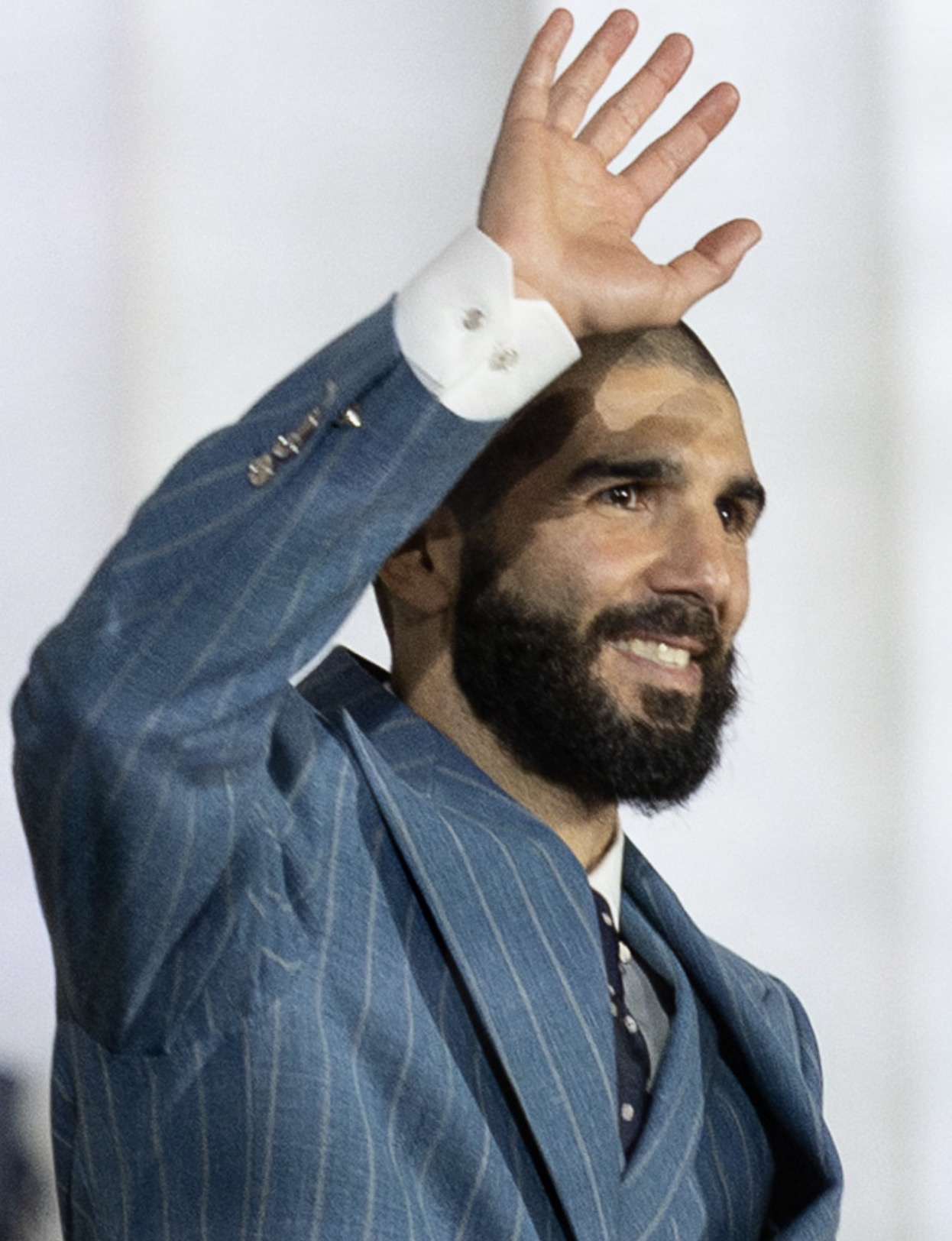
- Zahabi in 2026
- Born: November 19, 1987 (age 38); Laval, Quebec, Canada
- Height: 5 ft 8 in (1.73 m)
- Weight: 135 lb (61 kg; 9.6 st)
- Division: Bantamweight
- Reach: 68 in (173 cm)
- Fighting out of: Montreal, Quebec, Canada
- Team: Tristar Gym
- Rank: Black belt in Brazilian Jiu-Jitsu
- Years active: 2012–present

Mixed martial arts record
- Total: 17
- Wins: 14
- By knockout: 6
- By submission: 2
- By decision: 6
- Losses: 3
- By knockout: 2
- By decision: 1

Other information
- Notable relatives: Firas Zahabi (brother)
- Mixed martial arts record from Sherdog

Aiemann Zahabi (born November 19, 1987) is a Canadian mixed martial artist. He currently competes in the bantamweight division of the Ultimate Fighting Championship (UFC). Aiemann is the younger brother of Tristar Gym head trainer Firas Zahabi. As of October 17, 2026, he is #12 in the Meta UFC bantamweight rankings.

== Early life ==
Zahabi was born and raised in Quebec, Canada to a Lebanese family.

== Mixed martial arts career ==
=== Early career ===
Before joining the UFC, Zahabi amassed a record of 6–0 with all of his wins coming by first round stoppages.

=== Ultimate Fighting Championship ===
Zahabi debuted at UFC Fight Night 105 against Reginaldo Vieira. He won the fight by unanimous decision.

In his second fight for the promotion, Zahabi faced Ricardo Ramos on November 4, 2017, at UFC 217. He lost the fight by knockout in the third round.

Zahabi faced Vince Morales on May 4, 2019, at UFC Fight Night 151. He lost the fight by unanimous decision.

Zahabi was expected to face promotional newcomer Drako Rodriguez on December 19, 2020, at UFC Fight Night 183. However Zahabi tested positive for COVID-19 and the bout was scratched, with no replacement being sought for Drako. The pair was rescheduled for UFC Fight Night 185 on February 20, 2021. At the weigh-ins, Rodriguez weighed in at 140.5 pounds, four and a half pounds over the bantamweight non-title fight limit. He was fined 30% of his purse which went to his opponent Zahabi and the bout proceeded at catchweight. Zahabi won the fight via knockout in round one. This win earned him the Performance of the Night award.

Zahabi faced The Ultimate Fighter 29 bantamweight winner Ricky Turcios on July 9, 2022, at UFC on ESPN 39. He won the fight via unanimous decision.

Zahabi faced Aori Qileng on June 10, 2023, at UFC 289. He won the fight by knockout in the first round.

Zahabi faced Javid Basharat on March 2, 2024, at UFC Fight Night 238. He won the bout by unanimous decision.

Zahabi was scheduled to face Marcus McGhee on September 7, 2024 at UFC Fight Night 242. However, Zahabi withdrew from the bout and therefore the bout was cancelled.

Zahabi faced Pedro Munhoz on November 2, 2024 at UFC Fight Night 246. He won the fight via unanimous decision.

Zahabi was scheduled to face former two-time UFC Featherweight Champion José Aldo in a Featherweight bout on May 15, 2025 at UFC 315. The bout was originally scheduled for Bantamweight, but was changed on the day of the weigh-ins after Aldo couldn't make weight. He won the fight by unanimous decision. 16 out of 20 media outlets scored the bout for Aldo.

Zahabi faced former UFC Bantamweight Championship challenger Marlon Vera on October 18, 2025, at UFC Fight Night 262. He won the fight by split decision.

Zahabi faced former bantamweight champion Sean O'Malley on June 14, 2026 at UFC Freedom 250. He lost the fight by technical knockout in the second round.

== Championships and accomplishments ==
- Ultimate Fighting Championship
  - Performance of the Night (One time) vs. Drako Rodriguez
  - Highest significant strike defense in UFC Bantamweight division history (69.2%)

== Mixed martial arts record ==
Professional record breakdown
17 matches	14 wins	3 losses
By knockout	6	2
By submission	2	0
By decision	6	1

Res.	Record	Opponent	Method	Event	Date	Round	Time	Location	Notes
Loss	14–3	Sean O'Malley	TKO (punches)	UFC Freedom 250	June 14, 2026	2	4:02	Washington, D.C., United States	
Win	14–2	Marlon Vera	Decision (split)	UFC Fight Night: de Ridder vs. Allen	October 18, 2025	3	5:00	Vancouver, British Columbia, Canada	Return to Bantamweight.
Win	13–2	José Aldo	Decision (unanimous)	UFC 315	May 10, 2025	3	5:00	Montreal, Quebec, Canada	Featherweight debut.
Win	12–2	Pedro Munhoz	Decision (unanimous)	UFC Fight Night: Moreno vs. Albazi	November 2, 2024	3	5:00	Edmonton, Alberta, Canada	
Win	11–2	Javid Basharat	Decision (unanimous)	UFC Fight Night: Rozenstruik vs. Gaziev	March 2, 2024	3	5:00	Las Vegas, Nevada, United States	
Win	10–2	Aori Qileng	KO (punches)	UFC 289	June 10, 2023	1	1:04	Vancouver, British Columbia, Canada	
Win	9–2	Ricky Turcios	Decision (unanimous)	UFC on ESPN: dos Anjos vs. Fiziev	July 9, 2022	3	5:00	Las Vegas, Nevada, United States	
Win	8–2	Drako Rodriguez	KO (punch)	UFC Fight Night: Blaydes vs. Lewis	February 20, 2021	1	3:05	Las Vegas, Nevada, United States	Catchweight (140.5 lb) bout; Rodriguez missed weight. Performance of the Night.
Loss	7–2	Vince Morales	Decision (unanimous)	UFC Fight Night: Iaquinta vs. Cowboy	May 4, 2019	3	5:00	Ottawa, Ontario, Canada	
Loss	7–1	Ricardo Ramos	KO (spinning back elbow)	UFC 217	November 4, 2017	3	1:58	New York City, New York, United States	
Win	7–0	Reginaldo Vieira	Decision (unanimous)	UFC Fight Night: Lewis vs. Browne	February 19, 2017	3	5:00	Halifax, Nova Scotia, Canada	
Win	6–0	Kyle Oliveira	TKO (knee injury)	Prestige FC 2	March 12, 2016	1	2:17	Regina, Saskatchewan, Canada	
Win	5–0	Jeremy Dichiara	TKO (punches)	Hybrid Pro Series 4	October 17, 2015	1	0:18	Montreal, Quebec, Canada	
Win	4–0	Scott Farhat	KO (punch)	Rivals MMA 1	March 13, 2015	1	2:36	Montreal, Quebec, Canada	
Win	3–0	Wesley Bowman	Submission (ankle lock)	Hybrid Pro Series 2	November 15, 2014	1	4:40	Gatineau, Quebec, Canada	
Win	2–0	Phillip Deschambeault	Submission (rear-naked choke)	Wednesday Night Fights 1	March 5, 2014	1	2:33	Montreal, Quebec, Canada	
Win	1–0	Kyle Vivian	TKO (submission to punches)	SLAMM 1	November 30, 2012	1	1:28	Montreal, Quebec, Canada	Bantamweight debut.
