= Azamat Bekoev =

Russian mixed martial artist (born 1995)

- Born: Azamat Ruslanovich Bekoev; December 30, 1995 (age 30); Vladikavkaz, North Ossetia, Russia
- Native name: Азамат Русланович Бекоев
- Other names: King Pin
- Height: 6 ft 0 in (1.83 m)
- Weight: 185 lb (84 kg; 13 st 3 lb)
- Division: Middleweight (2015–present)
- Reach: 72 in (183 cm)
- Style: Mixed Martial Arts
- Stance: Orthodox
- Fighting out of: Vladikavkaz, Russia
- Team: American Top Team
- Years active: 2015–present

Mixed martial arts record
- Total: 25
- Wins: 20
- By knockout: 8
- By submission: 8
- By decision: 4
- Losses: 5
- By knockout: 1
- By submission: 2
- By decision: 2

Other information
- Mixed martial arts record from Sherdog

Azamat Ruslanovich Bekoev (Russian: Азамат Русланович Бекоев; born December 30, 1995) is a Russian professional mixed martial artist. He currently competes in the Middleweight division for the Ultimate Fighting Championship (UFC). Bekoev is a former LFA Middleweight Champion.

== Professional career ==
=== Early career ===
Bekoev made his professional debut on September 27, 2015. He took on two fighters that night as part of the MPF Moscow Rumble Open Cup. His first opponent of the night was Alexander Markosyan, whom he would beat via submission in the first round. His next opponent was Alexey Maslov, whom he would also beat via a first round submission.

=== Absolute Championship Berkut ===
His next fight would come over a year later for Russian promotion Absolute Championship Berkut. He faced fellow countryman Dzhabrail Yasaev. Bekoev would win the fight via submission in the third round.

=== Return to regionals ===
After a nine month layoff, Bekoev would return in a bout against Ramazan Magomedov. Bekoev would win the fight via yet another submission, this time in the third round.

He would return two months later, where he would yet again have two fights in one night. His first opponent was Iran's Mustafaliatif Muhammadi. Bekoev would win via knockout fifteen seconds into the first round. His next opponent was Azerbaijan's Sarkhan Garaev whom he would also defeat via a first round knockout.

=== Return to Absolute Championship Berkut ===
After a nine month hiatus, Bekoev would return against Amirkhan Kukaev. Bekoev would win the fight via submission in the second round.

He would return six months later against Elshad Guseynov. He would win via a second round submission.

Two months later, he would take on Magomedrasul Gasanov. Bekoev would unfortunately lose the fight via a Split Decision, and thus suffering his first defeat.

He would return three months later in a bout against Armenia's Mikhail Allakhverdian. Bekoev would win via a Unanimous Decision.

=== Return to regionals ===
After a nine month hiatus, Bekoev would return against Cameroon's Mbazou Nana. Bekoev would win via a first round TKO.

=== Absolute Championship Akhmat ===
Bekoev would return to now rebranded Absolute Championship Akhmat ten months after his last fight. He faced Araz Mamedov, whom he defeated via a first round TKO.

He would return two months later against Ibragim Magomedov. Bekoev would lose this fight via a Split Decision, thus suffering his second career defeat.

His next fight would come four months later against Chris Honeycutt. Bekoev would win via submission in the second round.

He would return five months later in a bout against Poland's Rafał Haratyk. Bekoev would lose this fight via submission in the third round. This would also mark his last fight in the promotion.

=== International fights ===
Bekoev would return two months later in a bout against Maksim Myalkin, whom he would beat via a first round submission.

After an eleven month hiatus, Bekoev would return in a bout against Iran's Behnam Salimi. Bekoev would win via a first round TKO.

=== Legacy Fighting Alliance ===
Four months later, Bekoev would make his debut with American based promotion Legacy Fighting Alliance. He would take on Brazil's Renato Valente. Bekoev would win via Unanimous Decision.

==== LFA Middleweight Champion ====
His next fight came four months later where he took on Dylan Budka for the interim LFA Middleweight Championship. Bekoev would win the fight via a Split Decision.

After a six month layoff, he would return to take on lineal champion Lucas Fernando. Bekoev would win via a Unanimous Decision and thus winning the undisputed title.

His first title defense came six months later, when he faced Chauncey Foxworth. Bekoev would successfully defend his title via a second round knockout.

=== Ultimate Fighting Championship ===
Bekoev would make his UFC debut on short notice against Zachary Reese on the undercard of UFC 311, after Reese's original opponent, Sedriques Dumas pulled out during fight week. Bekoev would go on to win the fight via a first round TKO, and thus successfully winning his UFC debut match.

His next fight would come four months later, when he took on Ryan Loder. Bekoev would win the fight via yet another first round TKO, and this time, he earned himself a Performance of the Night bonus.

Bekoev was scheduled to face Torrez Finney on August 2, 2025 at UFC on ESPN 71. However, Finney withdrew from the fight for unknown reasons and was replaced by promotional newcomer Yousri Belgaroui. In turn, as a result of Belgaroui not being able to get a visa in time, the bout was postponed to UFC Fight Night 262 which took place on October 18, 2025. Bekoev lost the fight by technical knockout in the third round.

Bekoev faced Tresean Gore on April 4, 2026 at UFC Fight Night 272. He lost the fight via a guillotine choke submission in the third round.

Bekoev was scheduled to face Andre Petroski on October 31, 2026 at UFC Fight Night 292. However, the bout was removed from the event due to Bekoev suffering a medical emergency.

== Championships and accomplishments ==
- Legacy Fighting Alliance
  - LFA Middleweight Championship (One time)
- Ultimate Fighting Championship
  - Performance of the Night (One time) vs. Ryan Loder

== Mixed martial arts record ==
Professional record breakdown
25 matches	20 wins	5 losses
By knockout	8	1
By submission	8	2
By decision	4	2

Res.	Record	Opponent	Method	Event	Date	Round	Time	Location	Notes
Loss	20–5	Tresean Gore	Technical Submission (guillotine choke)	UFC Fight Night: Moicano vs. Duncan	April 4, 2026	3	3:27	Las Vegas, Nevada, United States	
Loss	20–4	Yousri Belgaroui	TKO (punches)	UFC Fight Night: de Ridder vs. Allen	October 18, 2025	3	0:55	Vancouver, British Columbia, Canada	
Win	20–3	Ryan Loder	TKO (punches)	UFC on ESPN: Sandhagen vs. Figueiredo	May 3, 2025	1	2:44	Des Moines, Iowa, United States	Performance of the Night.
Win	19–3	Zachary Reese	KO (punches)	UFC 311	January 18, 2025	1	3:04	Inglewood, California, United States	
Win	18–3	Chauncey Foxworth	KO (punch)	LFA 186	June 22, 2024	2	4:32	Denver, Colorado, United States	Defended the LFA Middleweight Championship.
Win	17–3	Lucas Fernando	Decision (unanimous)	LFA 173	December 15, 2023	5	5:00	Las Vegas, Nevada, United States	Won and unified the LFA Middleweight Championship.
Win	16–3	Dylan Budka	Decision (split)	LFA 160	June 16, 2023	5	5:00	Owensboro, Kentucky, United States	Won the interim LFA Middleweight Championship.
Win	15–3	Renato Valente	Decision (unanimous)	LFA 152	February 10, 2023	3	5:00	Shawnee, Oklahoma, United States	
Win	14–3	Behnam Salimi	TKO (punches)	Octagon 36	October 21, 2022	1	2:25	İzmit, Turkey	
Win	13–3	Maksim Myalkin	Submission (guillotine choke)	Uzbekistan MMA Association: International Murod Khanturaev Memorial Tournament	November 7, 2021	1	3:10	Fergana, Uzbekistan	
Loss	12–3	Rafał Haratyk	Submission (scarf hold)	ACA 128	September 21, 2021	3	3:33	Minsk, Belarus	
Win	12–2	Chris Honeycutt	Submission (rear-naked choke)	ACA 122	April 23, 2021	2	4:33	Minsk, Belarus	
Loss	11–2	Ibragim Magomedov	Decision (split)	ACA 116	December 18, 2020	3	5:00	Moscow, Russia	Fight of the Night.
Win	11–1	Araz Mamedov	TKO (punches)	ACA 110	September 5, 2020	1	3:01	Moscow, Russia	
Win	10–1	Mbazou Nana	TKO (slam)	Union of Mixed Martial Arts: Alania Battle	December 22, 2019	1	1:10	Vladikavkaz, Russia	
Win	9–1	Mikhail Allakhverdian	Decision (unanimous)	Berkut Young Eagles 8	March 23, 2019	3	5:00	Grozny, Russia	
Loss	8–1	Magomedrasul Gasanov	Decision (split)	Berkut Young Eagles 7	December 22, 2018	3	5:00	Tolstoy-Yurt, Russia	2018 BYE Middleweight Grand Prix Semifinal.
Win	8–0	Elshad Guseynov	Submission (arm-triangle choke)	Berkut Young Eagles 6	October 27, 2018	2	1:35	Tolstoy-Yurt, Russia	2018 BYE Middleweight Grand Prix Quarterfinal.
Win	7–0	Amirkhan Kukaev	Submission (rear-naked choke)	Berkut Young Eagles 3	April 22, 2018	2	1:36	Tolstoy-Yurt, Russia	2018 BYE Middleweight Grand Prix Round of 16.
Win	6–0	Sarkhan Garayev	KO (punches)	Legion FC: Universal Battle Among Professional	July 30, 2017	1	3:18	Tashkent, Uzbekistan	
Win	5–0	Mustafaliatif Muhammadi	KO (punch)	Legion FC: Universal Battle Among Professional	July 30, 2017	1	0:15	Tashkent, Uzbekistan	
Win	4–0	Ramazan Magomedov	Submission (rear-naked choke)	Federation K-9: International Tournament 2017	May 20, 2017	2	2:59	Podolsk, Russia	
Win	3–0	Dzhabrail Yasaev	Submission (guillotine choke)	ACB 42	August 10, 2016	3	1:30	Vladikavkaz, Russia	
Win	2–0	Alexey Maslov	Submission (north-south choke)	Zaleev Fight Team: Moscow Rumble Open Cup 5	September 27, 2015	1	2:59	Moscow, Russia	Won the Moscow Rumble Middleweight Tournament.
Win	1–0	Alexander Markosyan	Submission (north-south choke)	Zaleev Fight Team: Moscow Rumble Open Cup 5	September 27, 2015	1	2:00	Moscow, Russia	Middleweight debut. Moscow Rumble Middleweight Tournament Semifinal.
