= UFC 311 =

2025 mixed martial arts event

UFC 311: Makhachev vs. Moicano
- The poster for UFC 311: Makhachev vs. Moicano
- Promotion: Ultimate Fighting Championship
- Date: January 18, 2025
- Venue: Intuit Dome
- City: Inglewood, California, United States
- Attendance: 18,370
- Total gate: $10,206,350
- Buyrate: 240,000

Event chronology
UFC Fight Night: Dern vs. Ribas 2	UFC 311: Makhachev vs. Moicano	UFC Fight Night: Adesanya vs. Imavov

UFC 311: Makhachev vs. Moicano was a mixed martial arts event produced by the Ultimate Fighting Championship that took place on January 18, 2025, at Intuit Dome in Inglewood, California, United States.

== Background ==
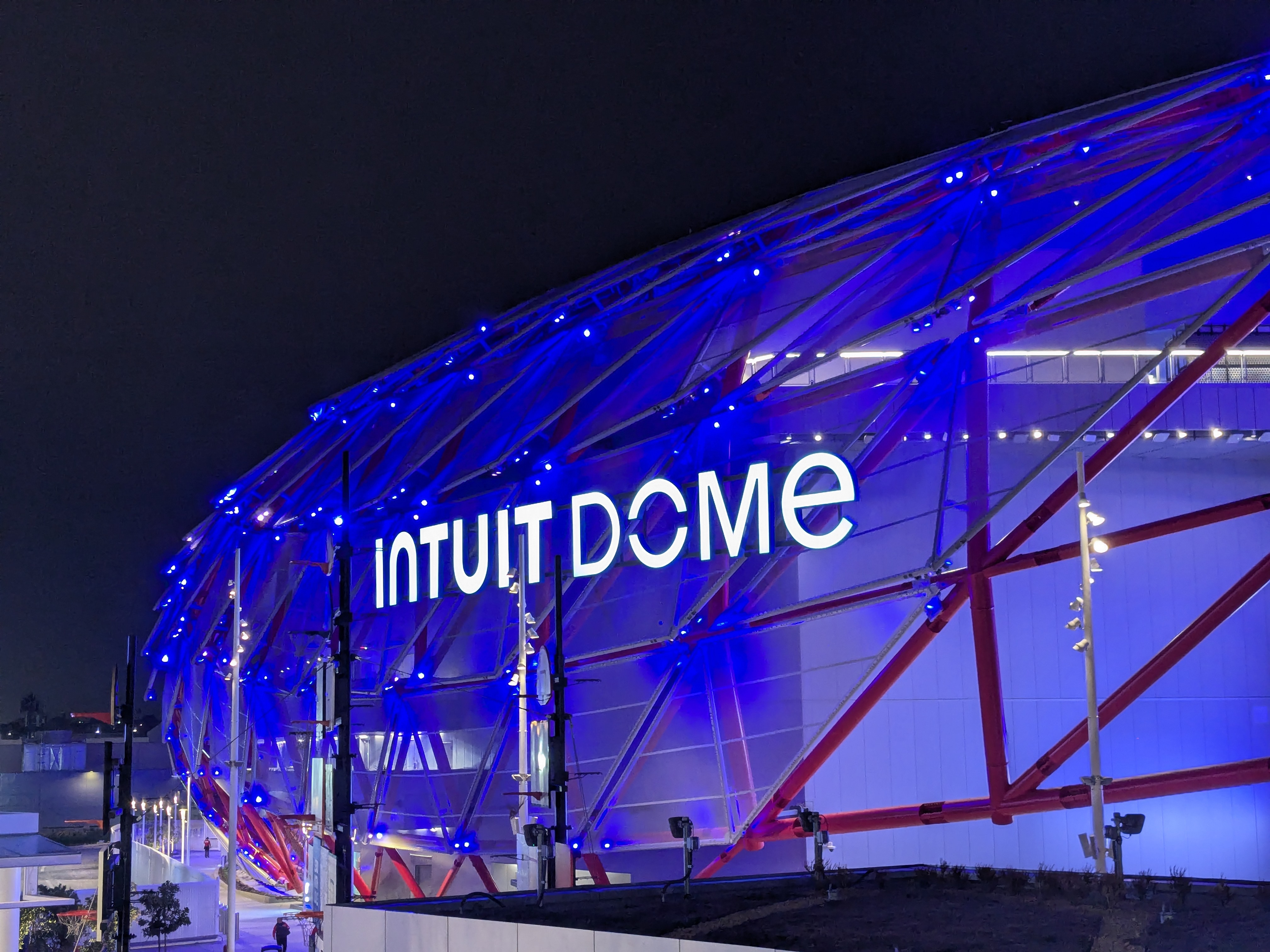
After hosting 17 events in the Greater Los Angeles area, this was the promotion's debut at Intuit Dome, which opened in August 2024.

The event marked the promotion's third visit to Inglewood and first since UFC 232 in December 2018. There were concerns regarding the realization of this event due to the series of recent wildfires affecting Southern California, but the venue's organization assured a week before that it would continue as scheduled.

A UFC Lightweight Championship bout between current lightweight champion Islam Makhachev and Arman Tsarukyan was originally scheduled to headline the event. They previously met at UFC Fight Night: Overeem vs. Oleinik in April 2019, where Makhachev defeated Tsarukyan by unanimous decision. One day before the event, it was reported that Tsarukyan suffered an injury that forced him to pull out of the fight. Renato Moicano, who was originally set to face Beneil Dariush at the same event, stepped in as a replacement for Tsarukyan, and Dariush did not compete at this event.

A UFC Bantamweight Championship bout between current champion Merab Dvalishvili and undefeated contender Umar Nurmagomedov served as the co-main event.

A bantamweight bout between The Return of The Ultimate Fighter: Team Volkanovski vs. Team Ortega bantamweight winner Ricky Turcios and Bernardo Sopaj was expected to take place at UFC Fight Night: Magny vs. Prates in November 2024, but it was scrapped after the weigh-ins due to undisclosed medical issues related to Turcios. The pairing was rescheduled to take place at this event.

Grant Dawson and Carlos Diego Ferreira are scheduled to compete in a lightweight bout at the event. They were once expected to meet at UFC Fight Night: Santos vs. Walker in October 2021, but Ferreira pulled out due to injury.

A light heavyweight bout between Johnny Walker and Bogdan Guskov was scheduled for this event. However, Walker withdrew from the fight due to an injury and was replaced by promotional newcomer Billy Elekana.

Zachary Reese and Sedriques Dumas were expected to meet in a middleweight bout at the preliminary card. However, Dumas pulled out during fight week and was replaced by the current LFA Middleweight Champion Azamat Bekoev.

During the event's broadcast, executive producer and one of The Ultimate Fighter creators Craig Piligian was announced as the next "contributor wing" UFC Hall of Fame inductee during International Fight Week festivities in Las Vegas this summer.

== Results ==
Main card
Weight class				Method	Round	Time	Notes
Lightweight	Islam Makhachev (c)	def.	Renato Moicano	Submission (brabo choke)	1	4:05	(Note: For the UFC Lightweight Championship.)
Bantamweight	Merab Dvalishvili (c)	def.	Umar Nurmagomedov	Decision (unanimous) (48–47, 48–47, 49–46)	5	5:00	(Note: For the UFC Bantamweight Championship.)
Light Heavyweight	Jiří Procházka	def.	Jamahal Hill	TKO (punches)	3	3:01
Heavyweight	Jailton Almeida	def.	Serghei Spivac	TKO (punches)	1	4:53
Middleweight	Reinier de Ridder	def.	Kevin Holland	Submission (rear-naked choke)	1	3:31
Preliminary card (ESPNews / FX / Disney+ / ESPN+)
Bantamweight	Raoni Barcelos	def.	Payton Talbott	Decision (unanimous) (30–27, 30–27, 30–26)	3	5:00
Middleweight	Azamat Bekoev	def.	Zachary Reese	KO (punches)	1	3:04
Light Heavyweight	Bogdan Guskov	def.	Billy Elekana	Submission (guillotine choke)	2	3:33
Lightweight	Grant Dawson	def.	Carlos Diego Ferreira	Decision (unanimous) (30–27, 30–27, 30–27)	3	5:00
Early preliminary card (FX / Disney+ / ESPN+ / UFC Fight Pass)
Women's Bantamweight	Ailín Pérez	def.	Karol Rosa	Decision (unanimous) (29–28, 29–28, 30–27)	3	5:00
Bantamweight	Muin Gafurov	def.	Rinya Nakamura	Decision (unanimous) (30–27, 30–27, 30–27)	3	5:00
Bantamweight	Bernardo Sopaj	def.	Ricky Turcios	Decision (unanimous) (30–27, 30–27, 29–28)	3	5:00
Flyweight	Tagir Ulanbekov	def.	Clayton Carpenter	Decision (unanimous) (30–27, 30–27, 29–28)	3	5:00

== Bonus awards ==
The following fighters received $50,000 bonuses.

- Fight of the Night: Merab Dvalishvili vs. Umar Nurmagomedov
- Performance of the Night: Jiří Procházka and Jailton Almeida

== Reported payout ==
The following is the reported payout to the fighters as reported to the California State Athletic Commission. The amounts do not include sponsor money, discretionary bonuses, viewership points, or additional earnings.

- Islam Makhachev: $200,000 (no win bonus) def. Renato Moicano: $250,000
- Merab Dvalishvili: $500,000 (no win bonus) def. Umar Nurmagomedov: $100,000
- Jiří Procházka: $250,000 (includes $50,000 win bonus) def. Jamahal Hill: $200,000
- Jailton Almeida: $220,000 (includes $110,000 win bonus) def. Serghei Spivac: $100,000
- Reinier de Ridder: $210,000 (includes $105,000 win bonus) def. Kevin Holland: $250,000
- Raoni Barcelos: $96,000 (includes $48,000 win bonus) def. Payton Talbott: $43,000
- Azamat Bekoev: $24,000 (includes $12,000 win bonus) def. Zachary Reese: $30,000
- Bogdan Guskov: $86,000 (includes $43,000 win bonus) def. Billy Elekana: $12,000
- Grant Dawson: $212,000 (includes $106,000 win bonus) def. Carlos Diego Ferreira: $100,000
- Ailín Pérez: $72,000 (includes $36,000 win bonus) def. Karol Rosa: $75,000
- Muin Gafurov: $28,000 (includes $14,000 win bonus) def. Rinya Nakamura: $28,000
- Bernardo Sopaj: $24,000 (includes $12,000 win bonus) def. Ricky Turcios: $28,000
- Tagir Ulanbekov: $72,000 (includes $36,000 win bonus) def. Clayton Carpenter: $28,000

== Fight night weights ==
The following is the official weigh-in weights compared to the fight night weights reported by the California State Athletic Commission.

- Islam Makhachev: 154.5 to 178 pounds (23.5 pounds), 17%
- Renato Moicano: 155 to 181.8 pounds (26.8 pounds), 17%
- Merab Dvalishvili: 134 to 156.8 pounds (22.8 pounds), 17%
- Umar Nurmagomedov: 135 to 156.8 pounds (21.8 pounds), 16%
- Jiří Procházka: 204.5 to 208.2 pounds (3.7 pounds), 2%
- Jamahal Hill: 205.5 to 221.8 pounds (16.3 pounds), 8%
- Reinier de Ridder: 184.5 to 212 pounds (27.5 pounds), 15%
- Kevin Holland: 183.5 to 190.4 pounds (6.9 pounds), 4%
- Raoni Barcelos: 135.5 to 158.2 pounds (22.7 pounds), 17%
- Payton Talbott: 135.5 to 158.2 pounds (22.7 pounds), 17%
- Jailton Almeida: 235 to 232.2 pounds (-2.8 pounds), -1%
- Serghei Spivac: 233 to 234.2 pounds (1.2 pounds), 1%
- Bogdan Guskov: 205.5 to 214.4 pounds (8.9 pounds), 4%
- Billy Elekana: 200 to 202.4 pounds (2.4 pounds), 1%
- Grant Dawson: 156 to 179.4 pounds (23.4 pounds), 15%
- Diego Ferreira: 156 to 173.2 pounds (17.2 pounds), 11%
- Azamat Bekoev: 185.5 to 203.2 pounds (17.7 pounds), 10%
- Zachary Reese: 185.5 to 201 pounds (15.5 pounds), 8%
- Ailin Perez: 135 to 152.2 pounds (17.2 pounds), 13%
- Karol Rosa: 135.5 to 154 pounds (18.5 pounds), 14%
- Muin Gafurov: 136 to 151.8 pounds (15.8 pounds), 12%
- Rinya Nakamura: 135.5 to 148.6 pounds (13.1 pounds), 10%
- Bernardo Sopaj: 135 to 147.8 pounds (12.8 pounds), 9%
- Ricky Turcios: 136 to 156.6 pounds (20.6 pounds), 15%
- Tagir Ulanbekov: 125.5 to 147.4 pounds (21.9 pounds), 17%
- Clayton Carpenter: 125.5 to 141.2 pounds (15.7 pounds), 13%

== Attendance ==
Although the event was announced as a sellout, there were a noticeable amount of empty seats in the arena. This was attributed to the January 2025 Southern California wildfires and Tsarukyan dropping out of the main event.

== See also ==
- 2025 in UFC
- List of current UFC fighters
- List of UFC events
