= 2023 in Legacy Fighting Alliance =

Information
- Promotion: Legacy Fighting Alliance
- First date: January 6, 2023
- Last date: December 15, 2023

2023 is the seventh year in the history of Legacy Fighting Alliance, a mixed martial arts promotion based in the United States.

== List of events ==
#	Event	Date	Venue	Location
1	LFA 149: Bunes vs. Horiuchi	January 6, 2023	Gila River Resorts & Casinos	Chandler, Arizona, U.S.
2	LFA 150: Farias vs. Sweeney	January 13, 2023	Mystic Lake Casino Hotel	Prior Lake, Minnesota, U.S.
3	LFA 151: Delano vs. Santos	January 28, 2023	Ginásio do Polvilho	Cajamar, Brazil
4	LFA 152: Valente vs. Bekoev	February 10, 2023	Grand Casino Hotel & Resort	Shawnee, Oklahoma, U.S.
5	LFA 153: Mariscal vs. Faria	February 17, 2023	Horseshoe Hammond Casino	Hammond, Indiana, U.S.
6	LFA 154: Fernando vs. Silva	March 10, 2023	Ginásio do Polvilho	Cajamar, Brazil
7	LFA 155: do Nascimento vs. Hodge	March 24, 2023	Seneca Niagara Casino & Hotel	Niagara Falls, New York, U.S.
8	LFA 156: Fuller vs. Waters	April 14, 2023	Sanford Pentagon	Sioux Falls, South Dakota, U.S.
9	LFA 157: Croden vs. Cavalcanti	April 21, 2023	Mystic Lake Casino Hotel	Prior Lake, Minnesota, U.S.
10	LFA 158: Lebosnoyani vs. Jones	May 19, 2023	Gila River Resorts & Casinos	Chandler, Arizona, U.S.
11	LFA 159: Bellato vs. dos Santos	May 27, 2023	CIDE Casa Branca Sports Complex	Caraguatatuba, São Paulo, Brazil
12	LFA 160: Sweeney vs. Begosso	June 16, 2023	Owensboro Sportscenter	Owensboro, Kentucky, U.S.
13	LFA 161: Davis vs. Siqueira	June 23, 2023	The Commerce Casino & Hotel	Commerce, California, U.S.
14	LFA 162: Conceição vs. Lopes	July 7, 2023	Ginásio do Polvilho	Cajamar, Brazil
15	LFA 163: Johns vs. Garcia	July 23, 2023	Bell County Expo Center	Belton, Texas, U.S.
16	LFA 164: Mazo vs. Lavado	August 4, 2023	Southwest University Park	El Paso, Texas, U.S.
17	LFA 165: Compton vs. Valente	August 18, 2023	Kaiser Permanente Arena	Santa Cruz, California, U.S.
18	LFA 166: Neto vs. Conrado	September 2, 2023	Ginásio do Polvilho	Cajamar, Brazil
19	LFA 167: Piersma vs. Smyth	September 15, 2023	Seneca Niagara Casino & Hotel	Niagara Falls, New York, U.S.
20	LFA 168: McKee vs. McPadden	September 22, 2023	Mystic Lake Casino Hotel	Prior Lake, Minnesota, U.S.
21	LFA 169: Ward vs. Walker	October 6, 2023	The Factory in Deep Ellum	Dallas, Texas, U.S.
22	LFA 170: Talundžić vs. Frunza	October 27, 2023	Dobson Arena	Vail, Colorado, U.S.
23	LFA 171: Neves vs. Cunha	November 3, 2023	Ginásio do Polvilho	Cajamar, Brazil
24	LFA 172: Davis vs. Chapolin	November 17, 2023	Arizona Financial Theatre	Phoenix, Arizona, U.S.
25	LFA 173: Fernando vs. Bekoev	December 15, 2023	Pearl Theater of Palms Casino Resort	Las Vegas, Nevada, U.S.

== Legacy Fighting Alliance 149: Bunes vs. Horiuchi ==
LFA 149: Bunes vs. Horiuchi
- The poster for LFA 149: Bunes vs. Horiuchi
- Promotion: Legacy Fighting Alliance
- Date: January 6, 2023
- Venue: Gila River Resorts & Casinos
- City: Chandler, Arizona, United States

LFA 149: Bunes vs. Horiuchi was a mixed martial arts event promoted by Legacy Fighting Alliance and that took place on January 6, 2023. It aired on UFC Fight Pass.

=== Background ===
A LFA Flyweight Championship for the vacant title between Felipe Bunes and Yuma Horiuchi headlined the event.

=== Fight card ===
Main card
Weight class				Method	Round	Time	Notes
Flyweight	Felipe Bunes	def.	Yuma Horiuchi	TKO (punches)	1	3:45	(Note: For the vacant LFA Flyweight Championship. Horiuchi missed weight (126.6 lbs); Only Bunes eligible to win title.)
Bantamweight	Marcus McGhee	def.	Luciano Ramos	TKO (punches)	3	1:39
Middleweight	Eric Fimbres	def.	Tony Charles	TKO (punches)	3	1:52
Lightweight	Cedric Katambwa	def.	Adam Garcia	TKO (rib injury)	1	0:58
Catchweight (165 lbs)	Princeton Jackson	def.	Chris Brant	Submission (rear-naked choke)	1	4:09
Amateur bouts
Bantamweight	Chance Ikei	def.	Shad Walters	TKO (punches)	2	1:14
Women's Strawweight	Grace DiFrancesco	def.	Kayla Reagan	TKO (punches)	1	2:56

== Legacy Fighting Alliance 150: Farias vs. Sweeney ==
LFA 150: Farias vs. Sweeney
- Promotion: Legacy Fighting Alliance
- Date: January 13, 2023
- Venue: Mystic Lake Casino Hotel
- City: Prior Lake, Minnesota, United States

LFA 150: Farias vs. Sweeney was a mixed martial arts event promoted by Legacy Fighting Alliance and that took place on January 13, 2023. It aired on UFC Fight Pass.

=== Results ===
Main card
Weight class				Method	Round	Time	Notes
Bantamweight	John Sweeney	def.	Ary Farias	Decision (unanimous) (29–28, 29–28, 29–27)	3	5:00
Heavyweight	Thomas Petersen	def.	Richard Foster	KO (punches)	1	3:48
Flyweight	Mark Climaco	def.	Miguel Sanson	Decision (unanimous) (30–27, 30–27, 30–27)	3	5:00
Welterweight	Jalin Fuller	def.	Scott Writz	Technical Submission (guillotine choke)	1	1:14
Bantamweight	Mitchell McKee	def.	Ira Lukowsky	KO (punches)	2	0:21
Middleweight	Dylan Budka	def.	Wes Schultz	Decision (unanimous) (29–28, 29–28, 29–27)	3	5:00
Bantamweight	Quang Le	def.	Henry Huff	Submission (rear-naked choke)	3	4:44
Preliminary Card
Featherweight	Isaac Thomson	def.	Gary Konkol	Decision (unanimous) (30–26, 30–26, 30–27)	3	5:00
Bantamweight	Ganbat Bayasgalan	def.	Adamu Isah	KO (punch)	1	0:35	(Note: Bayasgalan missed weight (146.2 lbs))
Featherweight	Kyle Zimick	def.	Connor Penka	Submission (rear-naked choke)	2	2:50
Amateur bouts
Featherweight	Dominic St. George	def.	Dominic Dagostino	TKO (punches)	2	2:51
Bantamweight	Shamar Williams	def.	Saw Dah	Decision (split) (30–27, 28–29, 30–27)	3	3:00
Welterweight	Brady Steinhorst	def.	Scott Zeller	TKO (doctor stoppage)	2	3:00
Featherweight	Darren Coleman	def.	Zach Gehl	KO (knee and punches)	1	0:20
Lightweight	Tyler Jones	def.	Casey Boykin	TKO (punches)	1	2:12
Bantamweight	Noah Gasho	def.	Moy Medina	KO (punches)	3	2:38
Postliminary card
Middleweight	Jackson McVey	def.	Deven Paulsen	Submission (guillotine choke)	1	0:52

== Legacy Fighting Alliance 151: Delano vs. Santos ==
LFA 151: Delano vs. Santos
- Promotion: Legacy Fighting Alliance
- Date: January 28, 2023
- Venue: Ginásio do Polvilho
- City: Cajamar, Brazil

LFA 151: Delano vs. Santos was a mixed martial arts event promoted by Legacy Fighting Alliance and that took place on January 28, 2023. It aired on UFC Fight Pass.

=== Fight card ===
Main card
Weight class				Method	Round	Time	Notes
Featherweight	Gabriel Santos	def.	José Delano	KO (punch to the body)	3	0:51	(Note: LFA Featherweight Tournament Final. For the vacant LFA Featherweight Championship.)
Women's Strawweight	Julia Polastri	def.	Brenda Gottig	Submission (arm-triangle choke)	1	4:50	(Note: For the vacant LFA Women's Strawweight Championship.)
Lightweight	Anderson Ferreira	def.	Milson Castro	TKO (punches)	1	4:37
Featherweight	Jonas Bilharinho	def.	Caio Machado	KO (body kick)	2	0:38
Flyweight	Marciano Ferreira	def.	Mateus Brauns	Decision (unanimous) (29–28, 30–27, 30–27)	3	5:00
Middleweight	Marco Tulio Silva	def.	Well Oliveira	TKO (punches)	1	4:26
Preliminary card
Lightweight	Jefferson Nascimento	def.	Matheus Rocha	TKO (punches)	1	1:18
Lightweight	Lucas Barros	vs.	Cassio Barão	Draw (majority) (28–27, 28–28, 28–28)	3	5:00
Lightweight	Gabriel Souza Galindo	def.	Lucas Escobar	Submission (guillotine choke)	1	1:03
Lightweight	Manuel Robson Minoto	def.	Joabson Alves	TKO (leg kicks)	1	3:17	(Note: Minoto missed weight (156 lbs))
Welterweight	Michael Oliveira	def.	Clever Souza	TKO (punches)	1	0:49
Women's Strawweight	Gabriela Fujimoto	def.	Laryssa Leila	Decision (unanimous) (29–28, 29–28, 29–28)	3	5:00

== Legacy Fighting Alliance 152: Valente vs. Bekoev ==
LFA 152: Valente vs. Bekoev
- Promotion: Legacy Fighting Alliance
- Date: February 10, 2023
- Venue: Grand Casino Hotel & Resort
- City: Shawnee, Oklahoma, United States

LFA 152: Valente vs. Bekoev was a mixed martial arts event promoted by Legacy Fighting Alliance and that took place on February 10, 2023. It aired on UFC Fight Pass.

=== Fight card ===
Main card
Weight class				Method	Round	Time	Notes
Middleweight	Azamat Bekoev	def.	Renato Valente	Decision (unanimous) (30–27, 30–27, 29–28)	3	5:00
Catchweight (160 lb)	William Starks	def.	Manny Muro	Decision (unanimous) (30–25, 30–25, 30–25)	3	5:00	(Note: Muro missed weight (165.6 lbs))
Heavyweight	Demoreo Dennis	def.	Trevor Wallace	TKO (punches)	1	1:43
Bantamweight	Magomed Idrisov	def.	Brandon Phillips	Decision (unanimous) (30–27, 30–27, 29–28)	3	5:00
Flyweight	An Tuan Ho	def.	Enkhjargal Banzaragch	Submission (kneebar)	2	2:12
Catchweight (130 lb)	Dione Barbosa	def.	Jessica Middleton	Decision (unanimous) (30–27, 30–27, 30–26)	3	5:00
Postliminary Bout
Middleweight	Kevem Felipe	def.	David Wright	KO (punch)	1	0:38
Preliminary card
Lightweight	Triston Gwaltney	def.	Ryan Fathi	Decision (unanimous) (29–28, 29–28, 29–28)	3	5:00
Welterweight	Justin Budd	def.	Caleb Jensen	KO (spinning backfist)	1	3:05
Women's Flyweight	Nejra Repp	def.	Jayde Sheeley	KO (punches)	1	4:50
Amateur bout
Middleweight	Tyree Overton	def.	Corey Piercy	Submission (rear-naked choke)	2	2:54

== Legacy Fighting Alliance 153: Mariscal vs. Faria ==
LFA 153: Mariscal vs. Faria
- Promotion: Legacy Fighting Alliance
- Date: February 17, 2023
- Venue: Horseshoe Hammond Casino
- City: Hammond, Indiana, United States

LFA 153: Mariscal vs. Faria was a mixed martial arts event promoted by Legacy Fighting Alliance and that took place on February 17, 2023. It aired on UFC Fight Pass.

=== Fight card ===
Main card
Weight class				Method	Round	Time	Notes
Featherweight	Jose Mariscal	def.	Guilherme Faria	TKO (punches)	2	2:02	(Note: Mariscal missed weight (150 lbs))
Welterweight	Bahromjon Mashrapov	def.	Logan Urban	TKO (conor stoppage)	1	5:00
Lightweight	Josh Streacker	def.	Ahmad Suhail Hassanzada	Decision (unanimous) (30–27, 30–27, 29–28)	3	5:00
Women's Strawweight	Alandria Brown	def.	Rachel Martinez	Technical Submission (rear-naked choke)	1	1:45
Lightweight	Justin Lovrich	def	Christian Turner	Decision (unanimous) (30–27, 29–28, 29–28)	3	5:00
Preliminary card
Middleweight	Kevin Nowaczyk	def.	Jorge Bezerra	TKO (doctor stoppage)	3	0:01
Light Heavyweight	Tristan Overvig	def.	Brandon Johnson	Submission (rear-naked choke)	1	3:13	(Note: Johnson missed weight (208.4 lbs))
Lightweight	Khatanbaatar Khuukhenkhuu	def.	Isaiah Flores	Submission (guillotine choke)	2	2:01

== Legacy Fighting Alliance 154: Fernando vs. Silva ==
LFA 154: Fernando vs. Silva
- Promotion: Legacy Fighting Alliance
- Date: March 10, 2023
- Venue: Ginásio do Polvilho
- City: Cajamar, Brazil

LFA 154: Fernando vs. Silva was a mixed martial arts event promoted by Legacy Fighting Alliance and that took place on March 10, 2023. It aired on UFC Fight Pass.

=== Fight card ===
Main Card
Weight class				Method	Round	Time	Notes
Middleweight	Lucas Fernando	deff.	Jansey Silva	KO (punch to the body)	4	2:34	(Note: For the vacant LFA Middleweight Championship.)
Heavyweight	Eduardo Neves	def.	Hyago Silva	TKO (punches)	1	4:22	(Note: For the vacant LFA Heavyweight Championship.)
Lightweight	Kauê Fernandes	def.	Felipe Douglas	KO (head kick)	1	0:45
Welterweight	Carlos Prates	def.	Eduardo Ramon	KO (knee)	1	2:25
Bantamweight	Jean Matsumoto	def.	Marlon Basílio	Submission (guillotine Choke)	2	3:00
Light Heavyweight	Rodolfo Bellato	def.	Mateus Messaros	TKO (knee and punches)	1	1:37
Preliminary Card
Welterweight	Richard Martins	def.	Reginaldo Junior	Decision (unanimous) (29–28, 29–28, 29–28)	3	5:00
Women's Flyweight	Luana Santos	def.	Bartira Rodrigues	Technical Submission (guillotine choke)	1	3:05
Welterweight	João Paulo Silva	def.	Julio Spadaccini	KO (flying knee and punches)	3	3:18
Lightweight	Gabriel Costa	def.	Rhalber Bernardo	KO (punch)	1	2:17
Welterweight	Michael Oliveira	def.	Bruno Teixeira	KO (punches)	1	3:47
Heavyweight	Guilherme Uriel	def.	Jhonatan Peçanha	TKO (head kick and punches)	1	3:26
Women's Strawweight	Lany Silva	def.	Sabrina Oliveira	Decision (unanimous) (30–27, 30–27, 30–27)	3	5:00

== Legacy Fighting Alliance 155: do Nascimento vs. Hodge ==
LFA 155: do Nascimento vs. Hodge
- Promotion: Legacy Fighting Alliance
- Date: March 24, 2023
- Venue: Seneca Niagara Casino & Hotel
- City: Niagara Falls, New York, United States

LFA 155: do Nascimento vs. Hodge was a mixed martial arts event promoted by Legacy Fighting Alliance and that took place on March 24, 2023. It aired on UFC Fight Pass.

=== Fight card ===
Main Card
Weight class				Method	Round	Time	Notes
Bantamweight	Jerrell Hodge	def.	Rafael do Nascimento	Decision (unanimous) (48–47, 49–46, 49–46)	5	5:00	(Note: For the interim LFA Bantamweight Championship.)
Featherweight	Mairon Santos	def.	Rafael Barbosa	Decision (unanimous) (30–27, 29–28, 30–27)	3	5:00
Light Heavyweight	Joe Taylor	def.	Ben Parrish	Decision (unanimous) (30–27, 29–28, 30–27)	3	5:00
Flyweight	Cody Davis	def.	Joseph Camacho	Submission (arm-triangle choke)	1	2:22
Flyweight	Rodney Kealohi	def.	Alvaro Prado	Decision (unanimous) (30–27, 30–27, 30–27)	3	5:00
Preliminary card
Middleweight	Shamidkhan Magomedov	def.	Kohlman Scribner	Submission (rear-naked choke)	1	4:38
Middleweight	Jay Manning	def.	Bruce Xavier	TKO (punches)	2	2:10
Welterweight	Alonzo Turner	def.	Austin Ross	Technical Submission (rear-naked choke)	2	1:36

== Legacy Fighting Alliance 156: Fuller vs. Waters ==
LFA 156: Fuller vs. Waters
- Promotion: Legacy Fighting Alliance
- Date: April 14, 2023
- Venue: Sanford Pentagon
- City: Sioux Falls, South Dakota, United States

LFA 156: Fuller vs. Waters was a mixed martial arts event promoted by Legacy Fighting Alliance and that took place on April 14, 2023. It aired on UFC Fight Pass.

=== Fight card ===
Main Card
Weight class				Method	Round	Time	Notes
Welterweight	Trey Waters	def.	Jalin Fuller	KO (punch)	2	2:53	(Note: For the vacant LFA Welterweight Championship.)
Catchweight (175 lb)	Miguel Jacob	def.	Ryan Leininger	Decision (unanimous) (30–27, 30–27, 30–27)	3	5:00
Lightweight	Richie Lewis	def.	Jordan Isordia	Decision (unanimous) (30–26 30–25 30–24)	3	5:00	(Note: Lewis missed weight (156.6 lbs))
Women's Strawweight	Talita Alencar	def.	Kelsey Arnesen	Decision (unanimous) (30–26, 30–26, 30–27)	3	5:00
Lightweight	Nikita Kulshin	def.	Geovani Cruz	KO (punches)	1	0:17
Heavyweight	Ben Tynan	def.	Will Johnson	TKO (elbows)	2	1:43
Preliminary Card
Bantamweight	Tial Thang	def.	Jose Hernandez	Decision (unanimous) (30–26, 30–26, 30–25)	3	5:00
Welterweight	Jeff Nielsen	def.	Rueben Johnson	TKO (punches)	3	3:40
Amateur bouts
Featherweight	Antoine Tureaud	def.	Andres Lugo	Submission (guillotine choke)	3	0:36	(Note: Tureaud missed weight (146.6 lbs))

== Legacy Fighting Alliance 157: Croden vs. Cavalcanti ==
LFA 157: Croden vs. Cavalcanti
- Promotion: Legacy Fighting Alliance
- Date: April 21, 2023
- Venue: Mystic Lake Casino Hotel
- City: Prior Lake, Minnesota, United States

LFA 157: Croden vs. Cavalcanti was a mixed martial arts event promoted by Legacy Fighting Alliance and that took place on April 21, 2023. It aired on UFC Fight Pass.

=== Fight card ===
Main Card
Weight class				Method	Round	Time	Notes
Women's Bantamweight	Jacqueline Cavalcanti	def.	Melissa Croden	Decision (unanimous) (49–46, 48–47, 50–45)	5	5:00	(Note: For the vacant LFA Women's Bantamweight Championship.)
Lightweight	Arthur Estrázulas	def.	Bobby Lee	Submission (triangle choke)	2	3:15	(Note: Lee missed weight (157 lbs))
Lightweight	Kegan Gennrich	def.	Richie Miranda	Decision (split) (29–28, 28–29, 29–28)	3	5:00
Flyweight	Alden Coria	def.	Jesse Martinelli	Decision (unanimous) (30–27, 30–27, 30–26)	3	5:00
Women's Strawweight	Marnic Mann	def.	Amber Brown	Decision (unanimous) (29–28, 29–28, 29–28)	3	5:00
Catchweight (140 lb)	Amari Sengsavanh	def.	Kibedy Gordon	KO (punch)	2	0:43
Preliminary card
Catchweight (150 lb)	Griffin Parriott	def.	Kurtis Ellis	Submission (arm-triangle choke)	1	4:51
Women's Flyweight	Mariana Piccolo	def.	Rachael Lippert	Submission (rear-naked choke)	2	4:44
Catchweight (165 lb)	Austin Judge	def.	Cliff Wright	TKO (punches)	2	3:57
Middleweight	Jackson McVey	def.	Tom Krenzel	TKO (strikes)	1	3:47
Catchweight (140 lb)	Santos Verdinez	def.	Pierre Ba	Decision (unanimous) (29–28, 29–28, 29–28)	3	5:00	(Note: Verdinez missed weight (140.8 lbs))
Amateur bouts
Lightweight	Mitchell Wilson	def.	Brock Hamer	TKO (punches)	1	0:27
Bantamweight	Noah Gasho	def.	Jeffrey Tuley	Decision (unanimous) (30–27, 29–28, 29–28)	3	3:00
Featherweight	Brandon Mills	def.	Dylan Kiskila	Submission (rear-naked choke)	3	1:48

== Legacy Fighting Alliance 158: Lebosnoyani vs. Jones ==
LFA 158: Lebosnoyani vs. Jones
- Promotion: Legacy Fighting Alliance
- Date: May 19, 2023
- Venue: Gila River Resorts & Casinos
- City: Chandler, Arizona, United States

LFA 158: Lebosnoyani vs. Jones was a mixed martial arts event promoted by Legacy Fighting Alliance and that took place on May 19, 2023. It aired on UFC Fight Pass.

=== Fight card ===
Main card
Weight class				Method	Round	Time	Notes
Lightweight	JaCobi Jones	def.	Jean-Paul Lebosnoyani	TKO (referee stoppage)	2	2:18	(Note: For the vacant LFA Lightweight Championship.)
Catchweight (160 lb)	An Tuan Ho	def.	Edwin De Los Santos	Decision (unanimous) (30–27, 30–27, 30–27)	3	5:00
Flyweight	Aupuni Pagaoa	def.	Humberto Duarte	KO (punch)	2	0:47
Lightweight	Cedric Katambwa	vs.	Austin Wourms	No Contest (accidental groin kick)	1	0:53
Featherweight	Ivan Tena	def.	Riley Wiseman	Decision (unanimous) (30–27, 30–27, 30–27)	3	5:00
Catchweight (190 lb)	Eric McConico	def.	Kevem Felipe	Decision (unanimous) (29–27, 30–27, 30–27)	3	5:00	(Note: McConico missed weight (191.2 lbs))
Preliminary card
Flyweight	Chance Ikei	def.	Joe Stafford	Decision (unanimous) (30–27, 30–27, 30–27)	3	5:00	(Note: Stafford missed weight (126.6 lbs))
Welterweight	Tyler Jones	def.	Alex Martinez	TKO (punches)	1	1:43
Amateur bout
Featherweight	Paul Marghitas	def.	Kyetin Lindquist	TKO (knee and punches)	1	0:14
Bantamweight	Anthony Cruz	def.	Adrian Muñoz	TKO (punches)	2	2:20
Women's Strawweight	Grace DiFrancesco	def.	Maia Schmidt	Decision (unanimous)	3	5:00
Bantamweight	Ezra Elliott	def.	Deshawn White	Submission (D'Arce choke)	1	1:20
Heavyweight	Leon Mackey Jr.	def.	Chris Putton	KO (punches)	2	0:16

== Legacy Fighting Alliance 159: Bellato vs. dos Santos ==
LFA 159: Bellato vs. dos Santos
- Promotion: Legacy Fighting Alliance
- Date: May 27, 2023
- Venue: CIDE Casa Branca Sports Complex
- City: Caraguatatuba, São Paulo, Brazil

LFA 159: Bellato vs. dos Santos was a mixed martial arts event promoted by Legacy Fighting Alliance and that took place on May 27, 2023. It aired on UFC Fight Pass.

=== Fight card ===
Main card
Weight class				Method	Round	Time	Notes
Light Heavyweight	Rodolfo Bellato	def.	Acácio dos Santos	Decision (unanimous) (49–46, 49–46, 49–46)	5	5:00	(Note: For the interim LFA Light Heavyweight Championship.)
Catchweight (159 lb)	Anderson Ferreira	def.	Junior Luiz	TKO (punches)	1	3:31	(Note: Originally a lightweight bout; Luiz missed weight (159 lb).)
Catchweight (173 lb)	Geraldo Neto	def.	Argemiro Delmandes	Submission (rear-naked choke)	1	3:18	(Note: Originally a welterweight bout; Delmandes missed weight (173 lb).)
Flyweight	Lucas Rocha	def.	Matheus da Silva Severino	Decision (unanimous) (29–28, 29–28, 29–28)	3	5:00
Bantamweight	Vinicius Pires	def.	Kauã Fernandes	Submission (rear-naked choke)	1	3:46
Heavyweight	Hugo Cunha	def.	Fernando Batista	TKO (punches)	1	1:52
Preliminary card
Flyweight	Marcos Degli	def.	Hugo Paiva	Submission (rear-naked choke)	1	4:16
Bantamweight	Isaias Simões	def.	João Paulo Santos	Decision (unanimous) (30–27, 30–27, 30–27)	3	5:00
Lightweight	Juan Pablo Vieira	def.	Manuel Robson Minoto	Submission (rear-naked choke)	1	4:55
Light Heavyweight	Levi Rodrigues	def.	José Carlos Lima	TKO (punches)	2	1:28
Catchweight (117 lb)	Aieza Bertolso	def.	Rafaela Silva	Submission (armbar)	1	4:02	(Note: Originally a women's strawweight bout; Silva missed weight (117 lb).)

== Legacy Fighting Alliance 160: Sweeney vs. Begosso ==
LFA 160: Sweeney vs. Begosso
- Promotion: Legacy Fighting Alliance
- Date: June 16, 2023
- Venue: Owensboro Sportscenter
- City: Owensboro, Kentucky, United States

LFA 160: Sweeney vs. Begosso was a mixed martial arts event promoted by Legacy Fighting Alliance and that took place on June 16, 2023. It aired on UFC Fight Pass.

=== Fight card ===
Main card
Weight class				Method	Round	Time	Notes
Bantamweight	John Sweeney	def.	Allan Begosso	Decision (unanimous) (50–45, 49–46, 49–46)	5	5:00	(Note: For the LFA Bantamweight Championship.)
Middleweight	Azamat Bekoev	def.	Dylan Budka	Decision (split) (48–47, 47–48, 48–47)	5	5:00	(Note: For the interim LFA Middleweight Championship.)
Catchweight (150 lb)	Cortavious Romious	def.	Nathan Williams	Submission (armbar)	1	2:08
Catchweight (160 lb)	Josiah Harrell	def.	Michael Roberts	TKO (punches)	3	3:27
Heavyweight	Cameron Kinzig	def.	Aaron Bush	TKO (retirement)	1	5:00
Women's Flyweight	Aline Pereira	def.	Chelsea Conner	Decision (unanimous) (30–27, 30–27, 30–27)	3	5:00
Preliminary card
Heavyweight	Dieye Papa Badara	def.	Brooks Black	TKO (punches)	2	0:37
Welterweight	Damon Bell	def.	Alonzo Turner	Submission (rear-naked choke)	1	3:26
Middleweight	Mataeo Garner	def.	Trent Nott	TKO (elbows)	2	0:48
Flyweight	Joshua Perreira	def.	Itzik Yakobov	TKO (punches)	3	1:04
Women's Strawweight	Jayde Sheeley	def.	Diamond Long	Submission (armbar)	1	1:46

== Legacy Fighting Alliance 161: Davis vs. Siqueira ==
LFA 161: Davis vs. Siqueira
- Promotion: Legacy Fighting Alliance
- Date: June 23, 2023
- Venue: Commerce Casino & Hotel
- City: Commerce, California, United States

LFA 161: Davis vs. Siqueira was a mixed martial arts event promoted by Legacy Fighting Alliance and that took place on June 22, 2023. It aired on UFC Fight Pass.

=== Fight card ===
Main card
Weight class				Method	Round	Time	Notes
Flyweight	Cody Davis	def.	Igor Siqueira	TKO (punches)	5	3:05	(Note: For the vacant LFA Flyweight Championship.)
Bantamweight	Rafael do Nascimento	def.	Jordan Winski	Decision (unanimous) (30–27, 29–28, 29–28)	3	5:00
Featherweight	Danny Silva	def.	Alex Valentino Arteaga	TKO (punches)	1	4:13
Welterweight	Sarek Shields	def.	Jeffrey Craig	Submission (guillotine choke)	1	4:49
Middleweight	Luis Francischinelli	def.	Emmanueli Adzoh	TKO (punches)	1	1:25
Preliminary card
Flyweight	Daniel Park	def.	Alex Carrillo	TKO (punches)	2	1:38

== Legacy Fighting Alliance 162: Conceição vs. Lopes ==
LFA 162: Conceição vs. Lopes
- Promotion: Legacy Fighting Alliance
- Date: July 7, 2023
- Venue: Ginásio do Polvilho
- City: Cajamar, Brazil

LFA 162: Conceição vs. Lopes was a mixed martial arts event promoted by Legacy Fighting Alliance and that took place on July 7, 2023. It aired on UFC Fight Pass.

=== Fight card ===
Main Card
Weight class				Method	Round	Time	Notes
Women's Strawweight	Rose Conceição	def.	Elaine Lopes	Decision (unanimous) (48–47, 49–46, 48–47)	5	5:00	(Note: For the interim LFA Women's Strawweight Championship.)
Featherweight	Márcio Barbosa	def.	Wellington Prado	TKO (punch)	1	2:40
Lightweight	Jefferson Nascimento	def.	Italo Gomes	Decision (split) (27–30, 29–28, 29–28)	3	5:00
Flyweight	Alisson Murilo	def.	Bruno Suema	Decision (unanimous) (30–27, 30–27, 30–27)	3	5:00
Catchweight (130 lb)	Estefani Almeida	def.	Daniela Antonelli	Decision (unanimous) (29–27, 29–27, 29–27)	3	5:00
Light Heavyweight	Miguel Porto	def.	Rafael Tobias	KO (punch)	2	2:02
Preliminary card
Flyweight	André Lima	def.	Igor Taylon	TKO (elbows)	2	4:59	(Note: Lima missed weight (127 lb).)
Lightweight	Gabriel Costa	def.	Thiago Ivan	TKO (punches)	2	4:30
Welterweight	Michael Oliveira	def.	Francisco Ataliba	TKO (punches)	1	4:48
Flyweight	Renildo Monteiro	def.	Cassio Arduini	Decision (split) (29–28, 28–29, 29–28)	3	5:00
Heavyweight	Guilherme Uriel	def.	Abner Rodrigues	Submission (heel hook)	1	1:13
Women's Strawweight	Lany Silva	def.	Nawira Ferreira	Decision (unanimous) (30–27, 30–27, 29–28)	3	5:00
Catchweight (119 lb)	Gabriela Fujimoto	def.	Rafaela Silva	Submission (armbar)	2	2:51

== Legacy Fighting Alliance 163: Johns vs. Garcia ==
LFA 163: Johns vs. Garcia
- Promotion: Legacy Fighting Alliance
- Date: July 21, 2023
- Venue: Bell County Expo Center
- City: Belton, Texas, United States

LFA 163: Johns vs. Garcia was a mixed martial arts event promoted by Legacy Fighting Alliance and that took place on July 21, 2023. It aired on UFC Fight Pass.

=== Fight Card ===
Main Card
Weight class				Method	Round	Time	Notes
Featherweight	Javier Garcia	vs.	Elijah Johns	No Contest (overturned)	2	4:39	(Note: For the vacant LFA Featherweight Championship.)
Lightweight	William Starks	def.	Johnny Hopper	Decision (unanimous) (30–27, 30–27, 29–28)	3	5:00	(Note: Hopper missed weight (127 lbs))
Featherweight	Landry Ward	def.	Matheus Pereira	Decision (split) (29–28, 28–29, 29–28)	3	5:00	(Note: Pereira missed weight (147.8 lbs))
Lightweight	Angel Alvarez	def.	Milko Tucto	Decision (unanimous) (30–27, 30–27, 30–27)	3	5:00	(Note: Alvarez missed weight (160 lbs))
Flyweight	Kevin Fernandez	def.	Javier Cepeda	Submission (arm-triangle choke)	1	4:22
Light Heavyweight	Alik Lorenz	def.	Kyler Fairchild	TKO (punches)	1	4:26
Preliminary card
Featherweight	Erique Owens	def.	Jota Ninomiya	TKO (punches)	2	3:06
Middleweight	Oseyiomon Oiyemhonlan	def.	Zumarr Archer	KO (head kick)	3	1:39
Bantamweight	John Beckett	def.	Ian Engbrock	Decision (unanimous) (29–28, 29–28, 29–28)	3	5:00

== Legacy Fighting Alliance 164: Mazo vs. Lavado ==
LFA 164: Mazo vs. Lavado
- Promotion: Legacy Fighting Alliance
- Date: August 4, 2023
- Venue: Southwest University Park
- City: El Paso, Texas, United States

LFA 164: Mazo vs. Lavado was a mixed martial arts event promoted by Legacy Fighting Alliance and that took place on August 4, 2023. It aired on UFC Fight Pass.

=== Fight Card ===
Main Card
Weight class				Method	Round	Time	Notes
Women's Flyweight	Sabina Mazo	def.	Sandra Lavado	Decision (unanimous) (49–46, 50–45, 49–46).	5	5:00	(Note: For the vacant LFA Women's Flyweight Championship.)
Welterweight	Daniel Frunză	def.	Jalin Fuller	KO (punches)	1	3:36
Welterweight	Myktybek Orolbay	def.	Gláucio Eliziário	TKO (punches)	2	1:33
Featherweight	Isaac Thomson	def.	Lerryan Douglas	TKO (head kick and punches)	2	1:40	(Note: Douglas missed weight (146.6 lbs))
Flyweight	Josiah Reyes	def.	Jordan Burkholder	Decision (unanimous) (29–28, 30–27, 29–28).	3	5:00
Lightweight	Ilay Barzilay	def.	James Pleasant	Decision (split) (29–28, 28–29, 29–28).	3	5:00
Preliminary card
Women's Flyweight	Nejra Repp	def.	Mihaela Keller	TKO (punches)	3	2:06
Welterweight	Travis Arrellano	def.	Koery Windham	KO (punches)	1	2:20
Flyweight	Lívio Ribeiro	def.	Ricardo Ramirez	Submission (triangle choke)	1	3:40
Featherweight	Jeremy Alba	def.	Ricky Maynez	TKO (punches)	3	0:57

== Legacy Fighting Alliance 165: Compton vs. Valente ==
LFA 165: Compton vs. Valente
- Promotion: Legacy Fighting Alliance
- Date: August 18, 2023
- Venue: Kaiser Permanente Arena
- City: Santa Cruz, California, United States

LFA 165: Compton vs. Valente was a mixed martial arts event promoted by Legacy Fighting Alliance and that took place on August 18, 2023. It aired on UFC Fight Pass.

=== Fight Card ===
Main Card
Weight class				Method	Round	Time	Notes
Middleweight	Renato Valente	def.	Daniel Compton	TKO (punches)	2	0:49
Welterweight	Randall Wallace	def.	Wallace Lopes	TKO (elbow and punches)	1	2:04	(Note: Wallace missed weight (173 lbs))
Bantamweight	Allan Begosso	def.	Cristian Giovannie	Decision (unanimous) (30-26, 30-26, 30-27).	3	5:00	(Note: Giovannie missed weight (137 lbs))
Catchweight (130 lbs)	Eduardo Chapolin	def.	Leandro Soares	Decision (unanimous) (30-26, 30-26, 30-27).	3	5:00	(Note: Soares missed weight (137.2 lbs))
Women's Strawweight	Kendra McIntyre	def.	Alandria Rosales	Decision (unanimous) (30-27, 30-27, 30-27).	3	5:00
Light Heavyweight	Uran Satybaldiev	def.	Gabriel Thimoteo	Decision (unanimous) (30-27, 30-27, 29-28).	3	5:00
Preliminary card
Catchweight (140 lbs)	Adamu Isah	def.	Luciano Ramos	Decision (unanimous) (30-27, 30-27, 30-27).	3	5:00
Lightweight	Lucas Martino	def.	Matt Chapman	Decision (split) (30-27, 28-29, 30-27).	3	5:00	(Note: Martino missed weight (157.6 lbs))
Lightweight	Salvador Osorio	def.	Aris Arguello	TKO (doctor stoppage)	1	5:00
Women's Strawweight	Cristina Brador	def.	McKenna Mitchell	Decision (unanimous) (29-28, 29-28, 29-28).	3	5:00
Postliminary card
Heavyweight	Billy Ray Valdez	def.	Lorenzo Figueroa	Submission (rear-naked choke)	1	2:33

== Legacy Fighting Alliance 166: Neto vs. Conrado ==
LFA 166: Neto vs. Conrado
- Promotion: Legacy Fighting Alliance
- Date: September 2, 2023
- Venue: Ginásio do Polvilho
- City: Cajamar, Brazil

LFA 166: Neto vs. Conrado was a mixed martial arts event promoted by Legacy Fighting Alliance and that took place on September 2, 2023. It aired on UFC Fight Pass.

=== Fight card ===
Main Card
Weight class				Method	Round	Time	Notes
Welterweight	Geraldo Neto	def.	Magnus Conrado	Decision (unanimous) (49-45, 49-45, 49-43).	5	5:00	(Note: For the vacant LFA Welterweight Championship.)
Featherweight	José Delano	def.	Fabrício Soares	Decision (unanimous) (30-27, 30-27, 30-26).	3	5:00
Catchweight (140 lbs)	João Pedro Saldanha	def.	Fernando Laurenço	Submission (rear-naked choke)	1	2:04
Lightweight	Samuel Silva	def.	Rodrigo Lídio	Decision (split) (28-27, 28-29, 29-28).	3	5:00	(Note: Silva missed weight (157.4 lbs))
Catchweight (130 lbs)	Marciano Ferreira	def.	Wellington Mourão	Decision (unanimous) (29-28, 29-28, 29-28).	3	5:00
Welterweight	Richard Martins	def.	João Paulo Silva	KO (punch)	2	1:36
Preliminary card
Catchweight (150 lbs)	Cassio Barão	def.	Paulo Oliveira	TKO (punches)	1	0:36	(Note: Oliveira missed weight (155.8 lbs))
Bantamweight	Vinicius Pires	def.	Isaias Simões	Decision (unanimous) (29-28, 29-28, 30-27).	3	5:00
Women’s Strawweight	Yasmin Castanho	def.	Ruth Ravena	Decision (unanimous) (29-28, 29-28, 29-28).	3	5:00
Featherweight	Icaro Brito	def.	Junior Duarte	KO (punch)	1	3:03
Women’s Bantamweight	Nicoly Pedroza	def.	Raíssa Carvalho	Decision (unanimous) (30-26, 30-25, 30-27).	3	5:00
Women’s Flyweight	Beatriz Consuli	def.	Talia Amanda	Decision (unanimous) (30-25, 29-28, 30-26).	3	5:00
Women’s Strawweight	Aieza Bertolso	def.	Irlaine Gasai	Submission (kneebar)	2	2:13

== Legacy Fighting Alliance 167: Piersma vs. Smyth ==
LFA 167: Piersma vs. Smyth
- Promotion: Legacy Fighting Alliance
- Date: September 15, 2023
- Venue: Seneca Niagara Casino & Hotel
- City: Niagara Falls, New York, United States

LFA 167: Piersma vs. Smyth was a mixed martial arts event promoted by Legacy Fighting Alliance and that took place on September 15, 2023. It aired on UFC Fight Pass.

=== Fight card ===
Main Card
Weight class				Method	Round	Time	Notes
Welterweight	Jonathan Piersma	def.	Devin Smyth	KO (spinning wheel kick)	1	0:51
Welterweight	Shamidkhan Magomedov	def.	Bahromjon Mashrapov	Decision (unanimous) (30-27, 29-28, 30-27).	3	5:00
Women's Strawweight	Ashley Nichols	def.	Nadia Vera	Decision (unanimous) (30-27, 29-28, 30-27).	3	5:00
Catchweight (175 lbs)	Jeffrey Craig	def.	Barrington Bishop	Decision (unanimous) (29-28, 29-28, 29-28).	3	5:00
Middleweight	Liam Anderson	def.	Jay Manning	Submission (rear-naked choke)	2	2:59
Preliminary card
Middleweight	Eduardo Penha	def.	Jessen Ramcharan	Submission (armbar)	3	1:47
Middleweight	Austin Ross	def.	Mus'Aib Baiyina	Decision (unanimous) (30-27, 30-27, 30-25).	3	5:00

== Legacy Fighting Alliance 168: McKee vs. McPadden ==
LFA 168: McKee vs. McPadden
- Promotion: Legacy Fighting Alliance
- Date: September 22, 2023
- Venue: Mystic Lake Casino Hotel
- City: Prior Lake, Minnesota, United States

LFA 168: McKee vs. McPadden was a mixed martial arts event promoted by Legacy Fighting Alliance and that took place on September 22, 2023. It aired on UFC Fight Pass.

=== Fight card ===
Main Card
Weight class				Method	Round	Time	Notes
Bantamweight	Mitch McKee	def.	Sean McPadden	Decision (unanimous) (30-27, 29-28, 29-28).	3	5:00
Catchweight (160 lb)	Bobby Lee	def.	Lucas Clay	Decision (unanimous) (29-28, 29-28, 29-28).	3	5:00
Lightweight	Kegan Gennrich	def.	Donald Bush	Submission (arm-triangle choke)	2	4:34
Middleweight	Sean Connor Fallon	def.	Collin Huckbody	Submission (guillotine choke)	1	3:08
Flyweight	An Tuan Ho	def.	Kendrick Latchman	KO (punch)	2	0:13	(Note: Ho missed weight (126.6 lbs))
Bantamweight	Quang Le	def.	Sal Guerriero	Decision (split) (29-28, 27-30, 29-28).	3	5:00
Preliminary card
Women's Flyweight	Cheyanne Bowers	def.	Aline Pereira	Decision (unanimous) (30-26, 30-25, 30-26).	3	5:00
Featherweight	Tyler Mathison	def.	Griffin Parriott	TKO (punches)	2	3:01
Heavyweight	Bailey Schoenfelder	def.	Badou Zaky	TKO (punches)	1	4:05
Welterweight	Joey Hart	def.	Jeff Nielsen	TKO (doctor stoppage)	3	4:34
Light Heavyweight	Derek Benoit	def.	Mervin Miller	Disqualification (illegal knee)	2	4:59	(Note: Miller missed weight (209.4 lbs))
Amateur bouts
Bantamweight	Henry Wolfbauer	def.	Montgomery Frederiksen	Decision (unanimous) (30-27, 28-29, 29-28).	3	5:00
Featherweight	Nick Fishback	def.	Dylan Smerillo	Submission (arm-triangle choke)	3	1:11
Welterweight	Brett Bye	def.	C.J. Hays	Submission (arm-triangle choke)	1	2:13
Featherweight	Stephen Lesko	def.	Thad Becker	Decision (unanimous) (30-27, 30-27, 30-25).	3	5:00

== Legacy Fighting Alliance 169: Ward vs. Walker ==
LFA 169: Ward vs. Walker
- Promotion: Legacy Fighting Alliance
- Date: October 6, 2023
- Venue: The Factory in Deep Ellum
- City: Dallas, Texas, United States

LFA 169: Ward vs. Walker was a mixed martial arts event promoted by Legacy Fighting Alliance and that took place on October 6, 2023. It aired on UFC Fight Pass.

=== Fight card ===
Main Card
Weight class				Method	Round	Time	Notes
Featherweight	Alfred Walker	def.	Landry Ward	Decision (split) (28–29, 30–27, 29–28)	3	5:00	(Note: Ward missed weight (146.4 lbs))
Flyweight	Kevin Fernandez	def.	Joseph Camacho	Submission (arm-triangle choke)	2	4:16
Flyweight	Alden Coria	def.	Aaron La Farge	TKO (knee)	2	4:31
Women's Catchweight (140 lb)	Melissa Croden	def.	Katharina Lehner	TKO (punches)	3	3:20
Lightweight	Richie Miranda	def.	Derion Chapman	TKO (punches)	1	1:39
Middleweight	Ismail Israilov	def.	Daniel De La Cruz	TKO (punches)	3	2:07
Preliminary card
Featherweight	Erique Owens	def.	Jimmy Meza	Decision (unanimous) (29–28, 29–28, 29–28)	3	5:00
Welterweight	Marco Soto	def.	Jonathan Hanes	Decision (unanimous) (29–27, 30–27, 30–26)	3	5:00
Bantamweight	Shad Walters	vs.	Darius Miller	KO (knee)	2	0:38

== Legacy Fighting Alliance 170: Talundžić vs. Frunză ==
LFA 170: Talundžić vs. Frunză
- Promotion: Legacy Fighting Alliance
- Date: October 27, 2023
- Venue: Dobson Arena
- City: Vail, Colorado, United States

Legacy Fighting Alliance 170: Talundžić vs. Frunză was a mixed martial arts event promoted by Legacy Fighting Alliance and that took place on October 27, 2023. It aired on UFC Fight Pass.

=== Results ===
Main Card
Weight class				Method	Round	Time	Notes
Welterweight	Daniel Frunză	def.	Haris Talundžić	KO (elbow and punches)	3	4:59
Welterweight	Myktybek Orolbai	def.	Hayward Charles	KO (punch)	2	0:41
Featherweight	Isaac Thomson	def.	A.J. Robb	Decision (unanimous) (29–28, 29–28, 29–28)	3	5:00
Featherweight	Caio Machado	def.	Ilyor Bakhtiyar Uulu	Technical Submission (rear-naked choke)	2	3:02
Women's Flyweight	Shannon Clark	def.	Nejra Repp	Decision (unanimous) (30–27, 30–27, 30–27)	3	5:00
Flyweight	Jordan Burkholder	def.	Daniel Gonzales	Submission (rear-naked choke)	2	3:51
Preliminary card
Bantamweight	Carlos Rivera	def.	Hondo Gutierrez	Submission (guillotine choke)	2	1:57	(Note: Rivera missed weight (137.4 lbs))
Middleweight	Chaz Polson	def.	Austin Waterman	Submission (rear-naked choke)	2	3:52
Flyweight	Keynan Davis	def.	Walter Saragosa	TKO (punches)	1	0:43	(Note: Saragosa missed weight (127.2 lbs))
Amateur bouts
Bantamweight	Eli Wise	def.	Juan Sarrios	TKO (strikes)	1	2:37
Lightweight	Christian Garcia	def.	Jacob Hill	Decision (unanimous)	3	3:00

== Legacy Fighting Alliance 171: Neves vs. Cunha ==
LFA 171: Neves vs. Cunha
- Promotion: Legacy Fighting Alliance
- Date: November 3, 2023
- Venue: Ginásio do Polvilho
- City: Cajamar, Brazil

LFA 171: Neves vs. Cunha was a mixed martial arts event promoted by Legacy Fighting Alliance and that took place on November 3, 2023. It aired on UFC Fight Pass.

=== Fight card ===
Main Card
Weight class				Method	Round	Time	Notes
Heavyweight	Hugo Cunha	def.	Eduardo Neves (c)	Submission (arm-triangle choke)	2	4:25	(Note: For the LFA Heavyweight Championship.)
Lightweight	Jefferson Nascimento	def.	Gabriel Costa	TKO (punches)	2	0:24	(Note: For the interim LFA Lightweight Championship.)
Featherweight	Márcio Barbosa	def.	Gian Sarturi	TKO (punches)	1	3:08
Flyweight	Marcos Degli	def.	Alisson Murilo	Decision (unanimous) (30-27, 30-27, 30-27).	3	5:00
Heavyrweight	Jose Augusto	def.	Richard Jacobi	Decision (unanimous) (30-27, 30-27, 30-27).	3	5:00
Welterweight	Michael Oliveira	def.	Antônio Eduardo	TKO (punches)	1	0:31
Preliminary card
Flyweight	Jose Ochoa	def.	Juscelino Pantoja	Submission (anaconda choke)	1	4:30
Featherweight	Gustavo Henrique	def.	Demison Rodrigues	Disqualification (illegal kick)	3	1:16	(Note: Rodrigues missed weight (146.8 lbs))
Bantamweight	Gabriel Silva	def.	Carlos Marques	Decision (unanimous) (29-28, 29-28, 29-28).	3	5:00
Middleweight	Ryan Gandra	def.	Alessandro Gambulino	TKO (punches)	2	2:38
Heavyweight	Lucas Camacho	def.	Guilherme Uriel	TKO (punches)	1	4:28
Welterweight	Geovanis Palacios	def.	Gabriel Ramos	Decision (unanimous) (30-27, 30-26, 30-26).	3	5:00
Women's Strawweight	Lany Silva	def.	Sarah Barwick	Decision (unanimous) (30-27, 30-27, 30-26).	3	5:00

== Legacy Fighting Alliance 172: Davis vs. Chapolin ==
LFA 172: Davis vs. Chapolin
- Promotion: Legacy Fighting Alliance
- Date: November 17, 2023
- Venue: Arizona Financial Theatre
- City: Phoenix, Arizona, United States

LFA 172: Davis vs. Chapolin was a mixed martial arts event promoted by Legacy Fighting Alliance and that took place on November 17, 2023. It aired on UFC Fight Pass.

=== Fight card ===
Main Card
Weight class				Method	Round	Time	Notes
Flyweight	Eduardo Henrique	def.	Cody Davis (c)	TKO (punches)	4	2:36	(Note: For the LFA Flyweight Championship.)
Featherweight	Lerryan Douglas	def.	Ivan Tena	KO (punch)	1	1:38
Lightweight	Nikita Kulshin	def.	Juliano Prescendo	Decision (unanimous) (30-27, 30-27, 30-26).	3	5:00
Welterweight	Mirafzal Akhtamov	def.	Keyth Dawson	KO (punch)	1	1:12
Lightweight	Cedric Katambwa	def.	Bret Cooper	TKO (elbows)	2	1:47
Preliminary card
Women's Strawweight	Leslie Hernandez	def.	Cristina Brador	Decision (split) (29-28, 28-29, 29-28).	3	5:00
Women's Strawweight	Grace DiFrancesco	def.	Jasmine Pouncy	TKO (punches)	2	2:54
Amateur bouts
Lightweight	Jorge Lecuanda	def.	James Deitz	TKO (punches)	2	0:23
Heavyweight	Leon Mackey Jr.	def.	Tyler Gates	Decision (unanimous) (30-27, 30-27, 30-27).	3	3:00
Women's Catchweight (130 lbs)	Alex Apodaca	def.	Jenna Williams	Decision (split) (28-29, 30-27, 30-27).	3	3:00

== Legacy Fighting Alliance 173: Fernando vs. Bekoev ==
LFA 173: Fernando vs. Bekoev
- Promotion: Legacy Fighting Alliance
- Date: December 15, 2023
- Venue: Pearl Theater of Palms Casino Resort
- City: Las Vegas, Nevada, United States

LFA 173: Fernando vs. Bekoev was a mixed martial arts event promoted by Legacy Fighting Alliance and that took place on December 15, 2023. It aired on UFC Fight Pass.

=== Fight card ===
Main Card
Weight class				Method	Round	Time	Notes
Middleweight	Azamat Bekoev (ic)	def.	Lucas Fernando (c)	Decision (unanimous) (50–45, 48–47, 49–46)	5	5:00	(Note: For the unificaton of LFA Middleweight Championship.)
Women's Strawweight	Natalia Kuziutina	def.	Giovanna Canuto	Decision (unanimous) (49–46, 49–46, 49–46)	5	5:00	(Note: For the interim LFA Women's Strawweight Championship.)
Lightweight	Mitch Ramirez	def.	Aireon Tavarres	TKO (punches)	1	2:19	(Note: Tavarres missed weight (156.8 lb).)
Welterweight	Alfonso Leyva	def.	Sarek Shields	KO (flying knee)	2	2:51
Flyweight	Jordan Harris	def.	Aupuni Pagaoa	TKO (body kicks and punches)	1	3:23	(Note: Pagaoa missed weight (127.4 lb).)
Middleweight	Trent Miller	def.	Oseyiomon Oiyemhonlan	Submission (guillotine choke)	1	3:03
Preliminary card
Bantamweight	Eduardo Penha	def.	Ronny Hauser	Submission (rear-naked choke)	1	4:20
Lightweight	Ilay Barzilay	def.	Tyler Jones	Decision (unanimous) (30–27, 30–27, 29–28)	3	5:00
Lightweight	Shane Shapiro	def.	Jaylen Patrick Jones	Submission (arm-triangle choke)	2	2:17
Catchweight (140 lb)	Shadland Walters	def.	Patrick Cornett	Submission (rear-naked choke)	3	4:36	(Note: Cornett missed weight (140.4 lb).)

== See also ==
- 2023 in UFC
- 2023 in Bellator MMA
- 2023 in ONE Championship
- 2023 Professional Fighters League season
- 2023 in Absolute Championship Akhmat
- 2023 in Konfrontacja Sztuk Walki
- 2023 in Rizin Fighting Federation
- 2023 in LUX Fight League
- 2023 in Brave Combat Federation
- 2023 in Road FC
