= UFC Fight Night: de Ridder vs. Allen =

Mixed martial arts event in 2025

- The poster for UFC Fight Night: de Ridder vs. Allen
- Promotion: Ultimate Fighting Championship
- Date: October 18, 2025
- Venue: Rogers Arena
- City: Vancouver, British Columbia, Canada
- Attendance: 17,671
- Total gate: $2,702,134

Event chronology
UFC Fight Night: Oliveira vs. Gamrot	UFC Fight Night: de Ridder vs. Allen	UFC 321: Aspinall vs. Gane

UFC Fight Night: de Ridder vs. Allen (also known as UFC Fight Night 262 and UFC on ESPN+ 120) was a mixed martial arts event produced by the Ultimate Fighting Championship that took place on October 18, 2025, at Rogers Arena in Vancouver, British Columbia, Canada.

== Background ==
The event marked the promotion's seventh visit to Vancouver and first since UFC 289 in June 2023.

A middleweight bout between former ONE Middleweight and Light Heavyweight World Champion Reinier de Ridder and former LFA Middleweight Champion Anthony Hernandez was scheduled to headline the event. However, Hernandez was forced to withdraw from the bout due to an undisclosed injury and was replaced by fellow former LFA Middleweight Champion Brendan Allen.

A bantamweight bout between former UFC Bantamweight Championship challenger Umar Nurmagomedov and Mario Bautista was reportedly scheduled to headline the event. However, for unknown reasons, the bout was moved to UFC 321 one week later.

A middleweight bout between former LFA Middleweight Champion Azamat Bekoev and promotional newcomer Yousri Belgaroui took place at this event. They were initially scheduled to compete at UFC on ESPN: Taira vs. Park in August but the bout was postponed to this event as a result of Belgaroui not being able to get a visa in time.

== Results ==
Main card (ESPN+)
Weight class				Method	Round	Time	Notes
Middleweight	Brendan Allen	def.	Reinier de Ridder	TKO (corner stoppage)	4	5:00
Welterweight	Mike Malott	def.	Kevin Holland	Decision (unanimous) (29–28, 29–28, 29–28)	3	5:00
Bantamweight	Aiemann Zahabi	def.	Marlon Vera	Decision (split) (29–28, 28–29, 29–28)	3	5:00
Women's Flyweight	Manon Fiorot	def.	Jasmine Jasudavicius	TKO (punches)	1	1:14
Bantamweight	Charles Jourdain	def.	Davey Grant	Submission (guillotine choke)	1	3:05
Lightweight	Kyle Nelson	def.	Matt Frevola	Decision (unanimous) (30–27, 29–28, 29–28)	3	5:00
Preliminary card (ESPN+)
Lightweight	Drew Dober	def.	Kyle Prepolec	TKO (knees and punches)	3	1:16	(Note: Dober was deducted one point in round 3 due to an illegal groin strike.)
Bantamweight	Aori Qileng	def.	Cody Gibson	TKO (punches)	1	0:21
Flyweight	Bruno Gustavo da Silva	def.	Park Hyun-sung	Submission (rear-naked choke)	3	2:15
Middleweight	Djorden Ribeiro dos Santos	def.	Danny Barlow	Decision (unanimous) (29–28, 29–28, 29–28)	3	5:00
Women's Strawweight	Stephanie Luciano	def.	Ravena Oliveira	Submission (rear-naked choke)	3	2:50
Middleweight	Yousri Belgaroui	def.	Azamat Bekoev	TKO (punches)	3	0:55
Women's Bantamweight	Melissa Croden	def.	Tainara Lisboa	TKO (punches)	3	4:32

== Bonus awards ==
The following fighters received $50,000 bonuses.

- Fight of the Night: Drew Dober vs. Kyle Prepolec
- Performance of the Night: Charles Jourdain and Aori Qileng

== See also ==
- 2025 in UFC
- List of current UFC fighters
- List of UFC events
