= Zachary Reese =

American mixed martial artist (born 1994)

- Born: Zachary Patrick Reese; March 24, 1994 (age 32); Houston, Texas, U.S.
- Other names: Savage
- Height: 6 ft 4 in (1.93 m)
- Weight: 194 lb (88 kg; 13 st 12 lb)
- Division: Middleweight
- Reach: 77 in (196 cm)
- Fighting out of: Shiner, Texas, U.S.
- Team: WAR Training Center
- Years active: 2017–present

Mixed martial arts record
- Total: 16
- Wins: 11
- By knockout: 5
- By submission: 3
- By decision: 3
- Losses: 4
- By knockout: 3
- By decision: 1
- No contests: 1

Other information
- Mixed martial arts record from Sherdog

Zachary Patrick Reese (born March 24, 1994) is an American mixed martial artist. He currently competes in the Middleweight division of the Ultimate Fighting Championship (UFC).

== Background ==
Reese was born in Houston, Texas before he moved to Shiner. He worked in the oil fields as a well tester, juggling punishing 90-hour shifts away from home with early-morning and late-night training to keep his dream alive.

== Mixed martial arts career ==
=== Early career ===
Reese started his amateur career during 2012–2021, he amassed a 4–1 record in amateur. He turned pro in 2021, in an American regional circuit, Perk Fighting and Fury Fighting Championship, where he acquired a 5–0 record before his fight at Dana White's Contender Series.

=== Dana White's Contender Series ===
Reese was invited to the Dana White's Contender Series, he faced Eli Aronov at week 3 of DWCS season 7 on August 22, 2023. He won the fight via an armbar in round one and he was awarded a UFC contract.

=== Ultimate Fighting Championship ===
In his UFC debut, Reese faced Cody Brundage on December 2, 2023, at UFC on ESPN 52. He lost the fight by first round knockout due to a slam and punches.

Reese faced Julian Marquez on June 8, 2024, at UFC on ESPN 57. He won the fight by technical knockout in 20 seconds into the first round. This fight earned him his first Performance of the Night award.

Reese faced José Medina on August 24, 2024, at UFC on ESPN 62. He won the fight via unanimous decision.

Reese was scheduled to face Sedriques Dumas on January 18, 2025, at UFC 311. However, Dumas pulled out during fight week and was replaced by Azamat Bekoev. He lost the fight via knockout in round one.

Reese faced Duško Todorović on May 31, 2025, at UFC on ESPN 68. He won the fight via unanimous decision.

Reese faced Sedriques Dumas on September 13, 2025, at UFC Fight Night 259. The fight ended in no-contest after an unintentional groin kick by Reese rendered Dumas unable to continue.

After Robert Valentin's injured and Donte Johnson was not cleared to compete by the Nevada Athletic Commission, Reese stepped in to face Jackson McVey in a 195 pounds bout on November 8, 2025, at UFC Fight Night 264. He won the fight via a rear-naked choke in round two. This fight earned him another Performance of the Night award.

Reese faced Michel Pereira on February 21, 2026 at UFC Fight Night 267. He lost the fight by split decision. 9 out of 13 media outlets scored the bout for Reese.

Reese faced Ryan Gandra on July 11, 2026 at UFC 329. He lost the fight by technical knockout in the first round.

Reese faced Mickey Gall on October 31, 2026 at UFC Fight Night 292. After having one point deducted due to an accidental eyepoke, Reese won the fight by unanimous decision.

== Championships and accomplishments ==
- Ultimate Fighting Championship
  - Performance of the Night (Two times) vs. Julian Marquez and Jackson McVey

== Mixed martial arts record ==
Professional record breakdown
16 matches	11 wins	4 losses
By knockout	5	3
By submission	3	0
By decision	3	1
No contests	1	

Res.	Record	Opponent	Method	Event	Date	Round	Time	Location	Notes
Win	11–4 (1)	Mickey Gall	Decision (unanimous)	UFC Fight Night: Moicano vs. Nolan	October 31, 2026	3	5:00	Las Vegas, Nevada, United States	Reese was deducted one point in round 1 due to an eye poke.
Loss	10–4 (1)	Ryan Gandra	TKO (punches)	UFC 329	July 11, 2026	1	1:15	Las Vegas, Nevada, United States	
Loss	10–3 (1)	Michel Pereira	Decision (split)	UFC Fight Night: Strickland vs. Hernandez	February 21, 2026	3	5:00	Houston, Texas, United States	
Win	10–2 (1)	Jackson McVey	Submission (rear-naked choke)	UFC Fight Night: Bonfim vs. Brown	November 8, 2025	2	1:38	Las Vegas, Nevada, United States	Catchweight (195 lb) bout. Performance of the Night.
NC	9–2 (1)	Sedriques Dumas	NC (accidental groin kick)	UFC Fight Night: Lopes vs. Silva	September 13, 2025	1	0:51	San Antonio, Texas, United States	Accidental groin strike rendered Dumas unable to continue.
Win	9–2	Duško Todorović	Decision (unanimous)	UFC on ESPN: Gamrot vs. Klein	May 31, 2025	3	5:00	Las Vegas, Nevada, United States	
Loss	8–2	Azamat Bekoev	KO (punches)	UFC 311	January 18, 2025	1	3:04	Inglewood, California, United States	
Win	8–1	José Medina	Decision (unanimous)	UFC on ESPN: Cannonier vs. Borralho	August 24, 2024	3	5:00	Las Vegas, Nevada, United States	
Win	7–1	Julian Marquez	TKO (body kick and punches)	UFC on ESPN: Cannonier vs. Imavov	June 8, 2024	1	0:20	Louisville, Kentucky, United States	Performance of the Night.
Loss	6–1	Cody Brundage	KO (slam and punches)	UFC on ESPN: Dariush vs. Tsarukyan	December 2, 2023	1	1:49	Austin, Texas, United States	
Win	6–0	Eli Aronov	Submission (armbar)	Dana White's Contender Series 59	August 22, 2023	1	1:14	Las Vegas, Nevada, United States	
Win	5–0	Tommie Britton	TKO (punches)	Fury FC 76	March 24, 2023	1	0:52	San Antonio, Texas, United States	Catchweight (192 lb) bout; Britton missed weight.
Win	4–0	Aaron Phillips	Technical Submission (guillotine choke)	Fury FC 74	February 5, 2023	1	0:35	Houston, Texas, United States	
Win	3–0	Shahriar Zolfaghari	TKO (elbows and punches)	Fury FC 71	November 6, 2022	1	0:50	Houston, Texas, United States	Catchweight (200 lb) bout.
Win	2–0	Malik Jahmaze	TKO (punches)	Peak Fighting 15	August 21, 2021	1	4:13	Texarkana, Arkansas, United States	Catchweight (190 lb) bout.
Win	1–0	Fred Zamora	KO (elbows)	Peak Fighting 10	April 10, 2021	1	1:32	Springdale, Arkansas, United States	Middleweight debut.

== See also ==
- List of current UFC fighters
- List of male mixed martial artists
