= List of Super Fight League champions =

This is a list of Super Fight League champions in each weight division.

The SFL weight classes follow a full application of the Unified Rules of Mixed Martial Arts, as instated in 2001.

== Champions ==
=== Men's divisions ===
Division	Champion	Since	Defenses
Heavyweight	(United States) Richard Foster	April 23, 2022	0
Light heavyweight	(United States) Jay Radick	August 10, 2019	0
Middleweight	(United States) Luis Iniguez	Apr 23, 2022	0
Welterweight	(United States) Luis Iniguez	July 24, 2021	0
Lightweight	(United States) Tristan Connelly	April 28, 2018	1
Featherweight	(United States) Austin Springer	Oct. 5, 2019	0
Bantamweight	(United States) Chris San Jose	May 5, 2018	2
Flyweight	Vacant		

=== Women's divisions ===
Division	Champion	Since	Defenses
Featherweight	Vacant		0
Bantamweight	Vacant		0
Bantamweight (American division)	Vacant		0
Flyweight	Vacant		0
Strawweight	Vacant		0

== Championship history (male) ==
=== Heavyweight championship ===
206 - 265 lb (93 to 120 kg)

No.	Name	Event	Date	Reign	Defenses
1	(United States) Richard Foster def. DJ Linderman	Cage Sport 52; Tacoma, Washington, USA	July 21, 2018	147 days	
2	(United States) Sua Tuani	Cage Sport 54; Tacoma, Washington, USA	December 15, 2018	133 days	
3	(United States) Dylan Potter	Cage Sport 56; Tacoma, Washington, USA	April 27, 2019	871 days	
Potter vacated the title to compete on Dana White's Contender Series on Sept. 14, 2021
4	(United States) Richard Foster def. Sua Tuani	Cage Sport 62; Yakima, Washington, USA	April 23, 2022	1048 days (incumbent)	

=== Light heavyweight championship ===
186 - 205 lb (84 to 93 kg)

No.	Name	Event	Date	Reign	Defenses
1	(United States) Jay Radick def. Sua Tuani	Cage Sport 58; Tacoma, Washington, USA	August 10, 2019	2035 days (incumbent)	

=== Middleweight championship ===
171 to 185 lb (77 to 84 kg)

No.	Name	Event	Date	Reign	Defenses
1	(France) Xavier Foupa-Pokam def. John Troyer	Super Fight League 14; Mumbai, India	Mar 29, 2013	869 days	
Foupa-Pokam is no longer listed as the champion on SFL's website
2	(Canada) Chase Degenhardt def. Micah Brakefield	Super Fight League 42; Calgary, Alberta, Canada	August 15, 2015	224 days	
Degenhardt cancelled a bout in 2016 and subsequently never competed again
3	(United States) Luis Iniguez def. Albert Tadevosyan	Cage Sport 62; Yakima, Washington, USA	Apr 23, 2022	1048 days (incumbent)	

=== Welterweight championship ===
156 to 170 lb (70 to 77 kg)

No.	Name	Event	Date	Reign	Defenses
1	(India) Syam Prasad def. Bhabajeet Choudhury	Super Fight League 13; Mumbai, India	Dec 14, 2012	316 days	
2	(India) Pawan Maan Singh	Super Fight League 33; Mumbai, India	Oct 26, 2013	483 days	
Singh is no longer listed as the champion on SFL's website
3	(United States) Ben Fodor def. Jason Novelli	Super Fight League 37; Tacoma, Washington, USA	February 21, 2015	49 days	
Fodor vacated the title when he signed with World Series of Fighting
4	(United States) Tyson Cunningham def. Mike DuBois for the American title	Super Fight League 41; Tacoma, Washington, USA	July 11, 2015	826 days	
Cunningham was stripped of the title due to inactivity
5	(India) Amitesh Chaubey def. Jason Solomon	Super Fight League 43; Gurgaon, India	September 26, 2015	903 days	
SFL held its last event on March 17, 2018
6	(United States) Austin Vanderford def. Ben Fodor	Cage Sport 47; Tacoma, Washington, USA	October 14, 2017	489 days	
Vanderford vacated the title when he signed with Bellator MMA
7	(United States) Luis Iniguez def. Tony Murphy	Cage Sport 61; Tacoma, Washington, USA	July 24, 2021	1321 days (incumbent)	

=== Lightweight championship ===
146 to 155 lb (66 to 70 kg)

No.	Name	Event	Date	Reign	Defenses
1	(India) Rajinder Singh Meena def. Sandeep Yadav	Super Fight League 13; Mumbai, India	Dec 14, 2012	246 days	
2	(India) Pawan Maan Singh	Super Fight League 22; Mumbai, India	Aug 17, 2013	1673 days	
SFL held its last event on March 17, 2018
3	(United States) Julian Erosa def. Harrison Bevens for the American title	Super Fight League 36; Tacoma, Washington	Dec. 13, 2014	210 days	1. def. Drew Brokenshire at SFL 37 on Feb. 21, 2015
Erosa was stripped of his title when he withdrew out of his title fight with Justin Harrington
4	(United States) Justin Harrington def. Harrison Bevens	Super Fight League 41; Tacoma, Washington	July 11, 2015	595 days	1. def. Bobby McIntyre at SFL 44 on Sept. 26, 2015; 2. def. Bryan Nuro at SFL 49 on May 7, 2016.
-	(United States) Bryan Nuro def. Bobby McIntyre for the Interim Title	SFL 53: Cage Sport 43; Tacoma, Washington	December 17, 2016	70 days	
5	(United States) Julian Erosa (2) def. Bryan Nuro for the Interim Title	Cage Sport 44; Tacoma, Washington	February 25, 2017	140 days	1. def. Justin Harrington at Cage Sport 45 on April 22, 2017 to Unify the titles
6	(United States) Bobby McIntyre	Cage Sport 46; Tacoma, Washington	July 5, 2017	154 days	
McIntryre was stripped of his title when he decided to compete in a lower weight class
7	(United States) Julian Erosa (3) def. Bryan Nuro	Cage Sport 48; Tacoma, Washington	December 16, 2017	200 days	
Erosa vacated the title in June of 2018 when he decided to compete in Dana White's Contender Series
8	(Canada) Tristan Connelly def. Joey Pierotti for the Interim Title	Cage Sport 50; Tacoma, Washington	April 28, 2018	2504 days (incumbent)	1. def. Tyrone Henderson at Cage Sport 54 on December 15, 2018 to Unify the titles

=== Featherweight championship ===
136 to 145 lb (62 to 66 kg)

No.	Name	Event	Date	Reign	Defenses
1	(India) Bharat Khandare def. Narender Grewal	Super Fight League 13; Mumbai, India	Dec 14, 2012	288 days	1. def. Pierre Daguzan at SFL 21 on Aug 3, 2013
Khandare is no longer listed as the champion on SFL's website
2	(United States) Daniel Swain def. Nathan Stolen	Cage Sport 49; Tacoma, Washington	Feb. 10, 2018	91 days	
Daniel Swain was stripped of the title when he signed with M-1 Global on May 12, 2018
3	(United States) Kevin Boehm def. Talon Hammons	Cage Sport 58; Tacoma, Washington	Aug. 10, 2019	56 days	
4	(United States) Austin Springer	Cage Sport 59; Tacoma, Washington	Oct. 5, 2019	1979 days (incumbent)	

=== Bantamweight championship ===
126 to 135 lb (57 to 61 kg)

No.	Name	Event	Date	Reign	Defenses
1	(India) Anup Kumar def. Manoj Chuhan	Super Fight League 13; Mumbai, India	Dec 14, 2012	147 days	
2	(United States) Tom McKenna	Super Fight League 17; Mumbai, India	May 10, 2013	1772 days	
SFL held its last event on March 17, 2018
3	(United States) Victor Henry def. Cory Vom Baur	Super Fight League 35; Tacoma, Washington, USA	Oct. 4, 2014	239 days	
Henry vacated the title to compete in Pancrase
4	(United States) Journey Newson def. Anthony Zender	Cage Sport 46; Tacoma, Washington, USA	July 15, 2017	217 days	
Newson vacated the title to compete in Combat Games
5	(United States) Chris SanJose def. Casey Johnson	Cage Sport 51; Canyonville, Oregon, USA	May 5, 2018	2497 days (incumbent)	1. def. Benny Vinson at Cage Sport 57 on May 11, 2019; 2. def. Timothy Lewis at Cage Sport 60 on Feb. 22, 2020

== Championship history (female) ==
=== Women's flyweight championship ===
116 to 125 lb (52 to 56 kg)

No.	Name	Event	Date	Reign	Defenses
1	(United States) Colleen Schneider def. Sanja Sucevic	Super Fight League 14; Mumbai, India	Mar 29, 2013	140 days	
Schneider vacated the title when she left the SFL to join The Ultimate Fighter: Team Rousey vs. Team Tate cast.

=== Women's bantamweight championship (American division) ===
126 to 135 lb (57 to 61 kg)

No.	Name	Event	Date	Reign	Defenses
1	(United States) Colleen Schneider def. Brenda Gonzales	Super Fight League 35; Tacoma, Washington, USA	Oct. 4, 2014	146 days	
Schneider vacated the title when she left the SFL to join Invicta FC
