= Balhara =

Balhara may refer to:

== People ==
- Sanchit Balhara and Ankit Balhara, Indian film-score composers
- Nilesh Balhara, Indian kurash competitor at the 2014 Asian Beach Games
- Pincky Balhara, Indian kurash wrestler
- Ravindra Balhara, Indian competitor in the 2013 Super Fight League events

== Other uses ==
- Balhara (title), the Arabic form of Vallabha, a name and royal title used in parts of mediaeval India

== See also ==
- Balara (disambiguation)
- Belhara, in eastern Nepal
- Vallabha (disambiguation)
