= Aya Saeid Saber =

American martial artist

- Born: 20 March 1991 (age 35); Cairo, Egypt
- Other names: Sheklesa
- Nationality: Egyptian
- Height: 5 ft 7 in (170 cm)
- Weight: 127 lb (58 kg; 9 st 1 lb)
- Division: Flyweight (125 lb)
- Style: Kung Fu; Kickboxing
- Fighting out of: Cairo
- Team: Egypt Top Team
- Trainer: Mohamed Abdel Hameed
- Years active: 2012–2018 (MMA)

Mixed martial arts record
- Total: 11
- Wins: 3
- By knockout: 1
- By submission: 1
- By decision: 1
- Losses: 8
- By knockout: 3
- By submission: 4
- By decision: 1

Other information
- Mixed martial arts record from Sherdog

Aya Saeid Saber (Arabic: آية سعيد صابر; born 20 March 1991), also known as "Sheklesa", is a mixed martial artist, who is the first woman from Egypt to compete professionally in the sport.

== Biography ==
Saber was born on 20 March 1991. Her interest in martial arts began as a child when she earned a brown belt in karate in 2000. From there she joined the Egyptian National Kung Fu team, winning competitions with them. She then met Mohamed Abdel Hameed, a coach who introduced MMA to Egypt and established the Top Team - Egypt's MMA squad. Saber is the only woman in the team and is also the first woman from Egypt to compete in the sport. She coaches a new generation of women to become mixed martial artists; ultimately she intends to establish Egypt's first all-female MMA team. She recognises that in Egypt, where in 2013 over 99% of women had experienced sexual harassment, it is important for women to develop the skills in order to physically defend themselves from men.

== Mixed martial arts career ==
=== Egyptian Fighting Championship ===
Saber made her professional MMA debut on 7 October 2012 in the Egyptian Fighting Championship (EFC), defeating Fatma Mansour. After appearing in two Superfight League matches, she returned to the EFC, losing against Yousra Ahmed on 3 May 2013. In March 2014 she beat Aya Rashdan in the EFC.

=== Super Fight League ===
In 2012 she next fought Colleen Schneider at SFL 6, which Schneider won after stopping Saber from elbow strikes in the first round. Saber's next match was against Ritika Singh at SF 11, which Singh won.

=== One Championship ===
Saber fought Ana Julaton on 2 May 2014, where the boxer made her ONE Fighting Championship: Rise of Heroes debut. Julaton's fight debut was successful and she won the fight via TKO in the third round, despite commentators in advance expecting Saber to take the fight. On 17 October 2014 she took on Malaysian Muslim fighter Ann Osman at Stadium Putra, watched by 10,000 fans. Osman beat Saber in the first round.

In 2015, she returned to the One Championship and was defeated by Angela Lee in Round 1. This match was Lee's professional debut, although she had previously fought as an amateur and was well known in her home of Hawai'i.

=== Evolution Championship ===
On 27 March 2015, Saber beat Fathia Mostafa in the Evolution Championship with a TKO (punches).

=== Kunlun Fight ===
Saber's final fight in 2015 was against Jin Tang in the Kunlun Fight League, where Tang beat her in Round 1.

=== Glory of Heroes ===
In 2018 saber fought in the Glory of Heroes promotion, where she was defeated by Meng Bo.

== Mixed martial arts record ==
Professional record breakdown
11 matches	3 wins	8 losses
By knockout	1	3
By submission	1	4
By decision	1	1

Res.	Record	Opponent	Method	Event	Date	Round	Time	Location	Notes
Loss	3–8	Meng Bo	Submission (armbar)	Glory of Heroes 35: Meishan	October 12, 2018	1	N/A	Sichuan, China	
Loss	3–7	Jin Tang	Submission (armbar)	Kunlun Fight 34	November 21, 2015	1	1:58	Shenzhen, China	
Loss	3–6	Angela Lee	Submission (armbar)	ONE: Warrior's Quest	May 22, 2015	1	1:43	Kallang, Singapore	
Win	3–5	Fathia Mostafa	TKO (punches)	Evolution Championship: War Against Terrorism	March 27, 2015	1	3:00	Cairo, Egypt	
Loss	2–5	Ann Osman	TKO (elbows)	ONE FC: Roar of Tigers	October 17, 2014	1	3:15	Kuala Lumpur, Malaysia	
Loss	2–4	Ana Julaton	TKO (punches)	ONE FC: Rise of Heroes	May 2, 2014	3	4:01	Pasay, Philippines	
Win	2–3	Aya Rashdan	Submission (rear-naked choke)	Egyptian Fighting Championship 14	March 29, 2014	1	3:10	Cairo, Egypt	
Loss	1–3	Yousra Ahmed	Submission (guillotine choke)	Egyptian Fighting Championship 10	May 3, 2013	2	2:49	Cairo, Egypt	
Loss	1–2	Ritika Singh	Decision (unanimous)	SFL 11	November 30, 2012	3	5:00	Mumbai, India	
Loss	1–1	Colleen Schneider	TKO (elbows)	SFL 6	October 26, 2012	1	3:55	Mumbai, India	
Win	1–0	Fatma Mansour	Decision (unanimous)	Egyptian Fighting Championship 8	October 7, 2012	3	5:00	Cairo, Egypt	

== Personal life ==
Saber is married and has a daughter.
