= Mikkhail Vaswani =

Sports commentator

- Born: India
- Occupations: Television presenter, actor, voice-over artist
- Years active: 2007–present
- Known for: Hosting on Colors TV and Sony Entertainment Television

Mikkhail Vaswani is a sports commentator and television presenter from BCCI. Vaswani worked with networks including NDTV, Zee Times Now. He is also known as the face of Dial C for Cricket on Neo Cricket.
