= 2013 in SFL Contenders events =

Mixed martial arts events

2013 is the second year for Super Fight League, an Indian-based mixed martial arts (MMA) promotion. Whilst the SFL began holding events from February 22 with their first SFL Contenders event, which are untelevised events that take place in the SFL Training Centre as a way to build up the fighters before bringing forward to a television audience, the promotion made their televised return with SFL 14 on March 29, which was headlined by two title fights between Xavier Foupa-Pokam and John Troyer for the middleweight title, and Sanja Sucevic and Colleen Schneider for the women's flyweight title. The same event was also their first on ESPN Star Sports in India.

== List of events ==
Super Fight League has scheduled several fights cards throughout 2013:

Event	Date	Venue	City
SFL Contenders 1	February 22, 2013	SFL Training Center	Nasik, India
SFL Contenders 2	March 8, 2013	SFL Training Center	Nasik, India
SFL Contenders 3	March 17, 2013	SFL Training Center	Nasik, India
SFL Contenders 4	April 5, 2013	SFL Training Center	Nasik, India
SFL Contenders 5	April 17, 2013	SFL Training Center	Nasik, India
SFL Contenders 6	April 30, 2013	SFL Training Center	Nasik, India
SFL Contenders 7	May 18, 2013	SFL Training Center	Nasik, India
SFL Contenders 8	May 27, 2013	SFL Training Center	Nasik, India
SFL Contenders 9	May 31, 2013	SFL Training Center	Nasik, India
SFL Contenders 10	June 4, 2013	SFL Training Center	Nasik, India
SFL Contenders 11	July 26, 2013	SFL Training Center	Nasik, India
SFL Contenders 12	July 31, 2013	SFL Training Center	Nasik, India
SFL Contenders 13	August 5, 2013	SFL Training Center	Nasik, India

== Event summaries ==
=== SFL Contenders 1 ===
Results

Card
Weight class				Method	Round	Time	Notes
Welterweight	Haseebullah Qayumi	def.	Yash Kumar	TKO (punches)	1	1:33
Welterweight	Charanjit Singh	def.	Sunil Khokar	TKO (punches)	1	0:46
Welterweight	Siddharth Chandanshive	def.	Mayank Dogra	TKO (punches)	1	1:24
Middleweight	Srikant Sekhar	def.	Harvinder Singh Rana	TKO (punches)	1	4:16
Middleweight	Vikas Singh Ruhil	def.	Danny Mappla	Submission (rear-naked choke)	1	2:05
Middleweight	Shakti Singh	def.	Vicky Prasad Gupta	Submission (arm-triangle choke)	1	2:16
Light Heavyweight	Raj Chandra More	def.	Paritosh Yadav	Submission (rear-naked choke)	1	0:49
Heavyweight	Maninder Jeet	def.	Ali Barakat	TKO (punches)	2	1:12
Lightweight	Arun Singh Charak	def.	Nirmal Kumar	KO (head kick)	1	0:40
Lightweight	Kuldeep Singh Sekhon	def.	Bhuvan Sharma	Submission (rear-naked choke)	1	0:26

=== SFL Contenders 2 ===
Results

Card
Weight class				Method	Round	Time	Notes
Featherweight	Vikrant Salve	def.	Shabbir Shaikh	TKO (punches)	1	3:34
Featherweight	Ali Hadi	vs.	Kaptaan Singh Chadda	No Contest (medical stoppage)	1	0:00
Lightweight	Sunil Babu	def.	Karan Singh	TKO (punches)	2	3:05
Bantamweight	Sonu Sharsar	def.	Cores Marwein	TKO (retirement)	2	0:00
Bantamweight	Johny Ryntathiang	def.	Sachin Panwar	TKO (punches)	2	1:05
Bantamweight	Mahesh Kumar Baliyan	def.	Sachin Mahanta	Submission (guillotine choke)	1	3:51
Bantamweight	Shaikh Mohammed Farhan	def.	Rahul Sonkamble	TKO (punches)	1	1:45
Bantamweight	Prakash Bhandari	def.	Pravin Nikam	Submission (guillotine choke)	1	1:09
Featherweight	Vishal Singh	def.	Siddesh Shirgaonkar	TKO (punches)	1	1:13
Bantamweight	Aadil Bashir	def.	Monu Pancha	Submission (guillotine choke)	1	1:02

=== SFL Contenders 3 ===
Results

Card
Weight class				Method	Round	Time	Notes
Featherweight	Abhay Singh Shirole	def.	Ali Hadi	Submission (neck crank)	1	1:03
Welterweight	Sunil Khokhar	def.	Amitesh Chaubey	TKO (punches)	1	2:55
Welterweight	Siddharth Chandanshive	def.	Yash Kumar	TKO (punches)	1	0:58
Welterweight	Sunny George	def.	Afzal Sheikh	TKO (punches)	1	2:12
Welterweight	Tajodin Saiyed	def.	Mayank Dogra	TKO (punches)	1	1:56
Bantamweight	Prakash Bhandari	def.	Rahul Sonkamble	TKO (punches)	1	3:03
Lightweight	Nirmal Kumar	def.	Bhuvan Sharma	TKO (punches)	1	0:09

=== SFL Contenders 4 ===
Results

Card
Weight class				Method	Round	Time	Notes
Lightweight	Kuldeep Singh Sekhon	def.	Vishal Singh	Submission (rear naked choke)	1	1:10
Middleweight	Vicky Prasad gupta	def.	Danny Mappla	KO (punch)	1	0:15
Bantamweight	Aadil Bashir	def.	Sunil Babu	Submission (ankle lock)	1	0:43
Featherweight	Abhay Singh Shirole	def.	Monu Pancha	Submission (armbar)	1	3:43
Heavyweight	Sandeep Kumar	def.	Ali Barakat	Decision (unanimous)	3	5:00
Featherweight	Karan Singh	def.	Vikrant Salve	TKO (punches)	1	0:24

=== SFL Contenders 5 ===
Results

Card
Weight class				Method	Round	Time	Notes
Lightweight	Pawan Goyat	def.	Amit Mavi	Submission (guillotine choke)	1	2:31
Lightweight	Mukesh Gora	def.	Sameer Shaikh	Submission (rear naked choke)	1	2:43
Lightweight	Amitesh Chaubey	def.	Amit Goswami	Submission (guillotine choke)	1	0:46
Lightweight	Siddharth Chandanshive	def.	Amit Raj Kumar	Submission (rear naked choke)	1	4:30
Lightweight	Siddharth Chandanshive	def.	Amit Raj Kumar	Submission (rear naked choke)	1	4:30
Welterweight	Abdul Hamid	def.	Amit Kumar	Submission (front choke)	1	2:26
Welterweight	Srikant Sekhar	def.	Ravi Raj	TKO (punches)	1	2:37
Welterweight	Shailesh Ghoghale	def.	Sarwar Kundu	Submission (rear-naked choke)	1	2:05
Welterweight	Tajodin Saiyed	def.	Fuzail Reshamwala	TKO (punches)	1	1:04
Bantamweight	Arun Nagar	def.	Raj Singh Narania	TKO (punches)	1	2:13
Women's Featherweight	Deepika	def.	Priya Londhe	Submission (rear naked choke)	1	4:15
Women's Strawweight	Daizy Singh	def.	Tejaswini Nandedkar	Submission (front choke)	1	1:59
Light Heavyweight	Sandeep Kumar	def.	Raj Chandra More	Submission (front choke)	1	1:03

=== SFL Contenders 6 ===
Results

Card
Weight class				Method	Round	Time	Notes
Welterweight	Sahil Mev	def.	Kiran Bhumbe	Submission (triangle choke)	1	1:42
Featherweight	Sumeet Khade	def.	Neville Chauhan	KO (punch)	1	0:38
Featherweight	Vikrant Salve	def.	Sudhir Dabas	KO (punch)	1	3:40
Middleweight	Iqbal Bhat	def.	Chetan Pawar	TKO (punches)	1	0:08
Bantamweight	Amit Pal	def.	Sanjay Jadhav	Submission (guillotine choke)	1	2:35
Bantamweight	Perumal Swami	def.	Rahul Sonkamble	Submission (armbar)	1	0:27
Bantamweight	Atul Sharma	def.	Nitesh Yadav	TKO (punches)	1	1:35
Bantamweight	Sonu Sharsar	def.	Vinod Kumar	Submission (rear naked choke)	1	3:36
Bantamweight	Raghvendra Singh	def.	Prakash Bhandari	Submission (guillotine choke)	1	0:18
Flyweight	Ashish Gupta	def.	Chandrakant Jagdale	TKO (punches)	1	2:08
Flyweight	Vijay Dhoble	def.	Rahul Singh	TKO (punches)	2	2:11
Flyweight	Arun Chuhan	def.	Deepak Suresh Mohite	Submission (bulldog choke)	1	0:39
Flyweight	Sagar Koli	def.	Imran Ali	TKO (punches)	1	4:16
Flyweight	Abhishek Jamwal	def.	Junaid Khan	TKO (punches)	1	2:48
Light Heavyweight	Samarveer Mavi	def.	Jay More	Submission (guillotine choke)	1	1:14

=== SFL Contenders 7 ===
Results

=== SFL Contenders 8 ===
Results

=== SFL Contenders 9 ===
Results

=== SFL Contenders 10 ===
Results

Card
Weight class				Method	Round	Time	Notes
Bantamweight	Monu Pancha	def.	Subrata Das	KO (head kick)	1	1:10
Bantamweight	Harish Kumar	def.	Perumal Swami	Submission (front choke)	1	1:10
Featherweight	Amit Goswami	def.	Sudhir Shetty	KO (punch)	1	3:11
Bantamweight	Sachin Mahanta	def.	Rahul Sonkamble	KO (punch)	1	2:10
Middleweight	Javed Ali Khan	def.	Junaid Khan	TKO	1	0:30
Featherweight	Sumeet Khade	def.	Karan Singh	KO (punch)	1	3:11

== See also ==
- Super Fight League
