= Men's Semi-Contact at WAKO World Championships 2007 Coimbra -89 kg =

The men's 89 kg (195.8 lbs) Semi-Contact category at the W.A.K.O. World Championships 2007 in Coimbra was the third heaviest of the male Semi-Contact tournaments falling between the cruiserweight and heavyweight division when compared to Full-Contact's weight classes. There were twelve fighters from four continents (Europe, Africa, North America and South America) taking part in the competition. Each of the matches was three rounds of two minutes each and were fought under Semi-Contact rules.

Due to the low level of contestants, four of the fighters received a bye through to the quarter finals. The tournament gold medallist was Great Britain's Michael Page who defeated Dave Heffernan from Ireland on points in the final. Defeated semi finalists, Roberto Montuoro from Italy and Michael Simmons from the United States, won bronze.

== Results ==
These matches were decided on points.

1st Round
(Italy) Roberto Montuoro	13
(Netherlands) John Engelhardt	12
(Austria) Gerald Zimmermann	8
(Brazil) Alex Ortiz	7
(Turkey) Ismail Çakmaz	0
(United States) Michael Simmons	10
(United Kingdom) Michael Page	18
(Slovenia) Igor Kalsek	8

Quarter Finals
(Croatia) Marko Deša	23
(Italy) Roberto Montuoro	24
(Austria) Gerald Zimmermann	13
(Republic of Ireland) Dave Heffernan	23
(South Africa) Henry Van Der Walt	0
(United States) Michael Simmons	10
(United Kingdom) Michael Page	11
(Hungary) Peter Csikos	1

Semi Finals
(Italy) Roberto Montuoro	13
(Republic of Ireland) Dave Heffernan	16
(United States) Michael Simmons	2
(United Kingdom) Michael Page	12

Final
(Republic of Ireland) Dave Heffernan	1
(United Kingdom) Michael Page	11

== See also ==
- List of WAKO Amateur World Championships
- List of WAKO Amateur European Championships
- List of male kickboxers
