= Lena Ovchynnikova =

Ukrainian kickboxer and mixed martial artist

- Born: Oléna Serhíyivna Ovchýnnikova; April 22, 1987 (age 39); Dnipropetrovsk, Ukrainian SSR, Soviet Union
- Native name: Ле́на Овчи́ннікова
- Other names: Hunter
- Nationality: (Ukraine) Ukrainian
- Height: 1.67 m (5 ft 5 1/2 in)
- Weight: 56.7 kg (125 lb; 8.93 st)
- Division: Featherweight
- Style: Kickboxing, Muay Thai
- Fighting out of: Lviv, Ukraine
- Team: Union Gym
- Trainer: Viktor Lazurko
- Years active: 2006-present

Kickboxing record
- Total: 20
- Wins: 14
- Losses: 6
- By knockout: 2
- Draws: 0

Mixed martial arts record
- Total: 19
- Wins: 12
- By knockout: 1
- By submission: 8
- By decision: 3
- Losses: 6
- By knockout: 2
- By submission: 2
- By decision: 2
- No contests: 1
- Last updated on: January 25, 2014

Lena Ovchynnikova
Medal record

Representing Ukraine

Women's Kickboxing

ISKA Amateur European Championships
Gold medal – first place	2007	(Oriental)
Silver medal – second place	2007	(Full contact)

WPKA Amateur World Championships
Gold medal – first place	2011	(Low kick)

Women's Muay Thai

ISKA Amateur European Championships
Gold medal – first place	2007	

ISKA European Cup
Silver medal – second place	2008	

IFMA Ukrainian Championships
Silver medal – second place	Odessa 2010	

Oléna "Lena" Serhíyivna Ovchýnnikova (Ukrainian: Оле́на "Ле́на" Сергі́ївна Овчи́ннікова; born April 22, 1987) is a Ukrainian kickboxer and mixed martial artist who competes in the featherweight division in kickboxing and the flyweight division in MMA.

She is the reigning WBC Muaythai World Featherweight champion and the former world flyweight champion.

== Career ==
Lena Ovchynnikova came to prominence as an amateur kickboxer and Muay Thai fighter, medaling at various national, European and world championships. She became a world champion in the professional ranks for the first time in 2009 when she won the ISKA Women's World Super Bantamweight (56.4 kg/124 lb) Oriental Championship and the following year, she added two more world titles to her mantelpiece by winning the World Kickboxing Federation (WKF) Women's World Super Bantamweight (-56.4 kg/124 lb) belt under both kickboxing and Muay Thai rules.

She challenged Christine Theiss for her WKA world title in Dresden, Germany on November 20, 2010, losing by sixth round knockout. Ovchynnikova was then set to fight Jeri Sitzes in a match for the WBC Muaythai Women's International Bantamweight (-53.5 kg/118 lb) title in Haikou, China on December 18, 2010 but Sitzes withdrew for undisclosed reasons and was replaced by Li Xiao in a non-title fight. She defeated Li by unanimous decision.

Taking the place of Cong Wang who pulled out of the fight, Ovchynnikova faced professional debutant Tiffany van Soest in Las Vegas, Nevada, United States on October 22, 2011, and lost by technical knockout after retiring in her corner with a broken hand at the end of round two. Following this fight, Ovchynnikova forced herself to use only her left hand during rehabilitation which later made her ambidextrous. The pair were scheduled to rematch on July 21, 2012, in Croatia, but it never came to fruition.

Having amassed a perfect 8-0 record in mixed martial arts, Ovchynnikova signed with the Indian-based Super Fight League in 2012. She tasted defeat for the first time as a mixed martial artist in her promotional debut as she submitted to a rear-naked choke from Sanja Sučević in round two at SFL 1 in Mumbai on March 11, 2012. She then lost to Joanne Calderwood by unanimous decision at SFL 3 in New Delhi on May 6, 2012 in her next outing. Returning to Muay Thai, Ovchynnikova was expected to fight Emily Bearden for the IKF women's world bantamweight (-55.4 kg/122 lb) title at WCK Muay Thai: Nakamoto vs. Kitchen in Pala, California, US on August 18, 2012. Her opponent was later changed to Kealani Vanderleest in a non-title affair, however, and Ovchynnikova defeated her by unanimous decision. She was then set to compete in the Shoot Boxing World Tournament Girls S-Cup 2012 in Tokyo, Japan on August 25, 2012 and face Ham Seo-Hee in the quarter-finals but was pulled from the card due to problems between shoot boxing and Ovchynnikova's team and was replaced by Lisa Ward. She represented the WCK Muay Thai promotion's team against a squad of Chinese fighters from Wu Lin Feng at WCK Muay Thai: Matter of Pride in Las Vegas on November 11, 2012. Initially, her opponent was Tang Jin but was changed to Xifeng Tang. She lost by UD.

In her return to SFL, Ovchynnikova beat Fathia Mostafa via submission due to a guillotine choke at SFL 16 in Mumbai on April 26, 2013. Back in the Muay Thai ring, she defeated Emily Bearden by UD to be crowned the International Karate Kickboxing Council (IKKC) Women's World Super Bantamweight Muay Thai Champion at WCK Muay Thai: Hot Summer Fights in Temecula, California, US.

On January 25, 2014, she lost a split decision to Xiong Jingnan at Kunlun Fight 1 in Pattaya, Thailand.

=== Bellator MMA ===
Lena Ovchynnikova signed with Bellator MMA in 2016, going 2-2 in her first four fights in the promotion. Notably, she was the first-ever female flyweight to appear on a main card for the promotion.

Ovchynnikova was expected to face Denise Kielholtz in the co-main event of Bellator 196 in Budapest, Hungary on April 6, 2018. However, the fight did not happen.

Ovchynnikova was expected to face Kyra Batara in a strawweight bout at Bellator 261 on June 25, 2021. However, the bout was cancelled the week of the event with one of Batara's corner testing positive for COVID-19.

== Championships and awards ==
=== Kickboxing ===
- Boxxtomoi
  - 2015 Boxxtomoi Muaythai Women's Championship
- World Boxing Council Muaythai
  - 2014 WBC Muaythai World Flyweight Championship
  - 2019 WBC Muaythai World Featherweight Championship
- International Federation of Muaythai Amateur
  - 2010 IFMA Ukrainian Championships Silver Medalist (silver)
- International Karate Kickboxing Council
  - IKKC Women's World Super Bantamweight Muay Thai Championship (One time)
- International Sport Karate Association
  - 2007 ISKA Amateur European Championships Oriental Gold Medalist (gold)
  - 2007 ISKA Amateur European Championships Muay Thai Gold Medalist (gold)
  - 2007 ISKA Amateur European Championships Full Contact Silver Medalist (silver)
  - 2008 ISKA European Cup Muay Thai Silver Medalist (silver)
  - ISKA Women's World Super Bantamweight (56.4 kg/124 lb) Oriental Championship (One time)
- World Kickboxing Association
  - WKA Amateur Women's World Championship (One time)
- World Kickboxing Federation
  - WKF Women's World Super Bantamweight (-56.4 kg/124 lb) K-1 Championship (Two times)
  - WKF Women's World Super Bantamweight (-56.4 kg/124 lb) Muay Thai Championship (One time)
- World Pan-Amateur Kickboxing Association
  - 2011 WPKA Amateur World Championships Low Kick Gold Medalist (gold)

== Mixed martial arts record ==
Professional record breakdown
19 matches	12 wins	6 losses
By knockout	1	2
By submission	8	2
By decision	3	2
No contests	1	

Res.	Record	Opponent	Method	Event	Date	Round	Time	Location	Notes
Loss	12–6 (1)	Kate Jackson	TKO (doctor stoppage)	Bellator 223	June 22, 2019	1	4:20	London, England	
Loss	12–5 (1)	Alejandra Lara	Submission (rear-naked choke)	Bellator 190	December 9, 2017	3	4:09	Florence, Italy	
Win	12–4 (1)	Helen Harper	TKO (corner stoppage)	Bellator 177	April 14, 2017	2	5:00	Budapest, Hungary	
Win	11–4 (1)	Karla Benitez	Decision (unanimous)	Bellator 164	November 10, 2016	3	5:00	Tel Aviv, Israel	
NC	10–4 (1)	Mara Romero Borella	NC (overturned by WMMAF)	WMMAF 2016	May 13, 2016	3	5:00	Lviv, Ukraine	Originally a split decision win for Ovchynnikova; overturned later by WMMAF after review.
Loss	10–4	Rebecca Ruth	Decision (unanimous)	Bellator 150	February 26, 2016	3	5:00	Mulvane, Kansas, United States	
Win	10–3	Svetlana Gotsyk	Submission (rear-naked choke)	WMMAF: World MMA Championship, Day 3	October 18, 2014	3	3:40	Lviv, Ukraine	
Loss	9–3	Lily Kazak	TKO (punch)	Oplot Challenge 92	December 14, 2013	2	0:21	Kharkiv, Ukraine	
Win	9–2	Fathia Mostafa	Submission (guillotine choke)	Super Fight League 16	April 26, 2013	1	3:36	Mumbai, India	
Loss	8–2	Joanne Calderwood	Decision (unanimous)	Super Fight League 3	May 6, 2012	3	5:00	New Delhi, India	
Loss	8–1	Sanja Sučević	Submission (rear-naked choke)	Super Fight League 1	March 11, 2012	2	2:28	Mumbai, India	Strawweight bout.
Win	8–0	Eugenia Kostina	Submission (armbar)	PAMAU: President's Cup	September 3, 2011	1	3:26	Mariupol, Ukraine	
Win	7–0	Lyudmyla Pylypchak	Submission (armbar)	Independence Cup 2011	August 19, 2011	3	1:01	Lviv, Ukraine	
Win	6–0	Anna Smirnova	Submission (armbar)	International Gala Festival	August 23, 2009	1	4:12	Truskavets, Ukraine	
Win	5–0	Alina Premilou	Submission (armbar)	Ultimate Cage Fighters Championship: 20,000 Dollar Tournament	April 4, 2009	1	4:01	Vienna, Austria	
Win	4–0	Olga Prybulska	Submission (armbar)	International Gala Festival	July 7, 2008	2	2:20	Gomel, Belarus	
Win	3–0	Olga Prybulska	Decision (unanimous)	ISKA: Europe Cup 2008	April 12, 2008	3	5:00	Kyiv, Ukraine	
Win	2–0	Anna Zubritska	Submission (armbar)	ISKA: Union Cup 2007	September 14, 2007	3	4:50	Kyiv, Ukraine	
Win	1–0	Svetlana Svetlana	Decision (unanimous)	International Gala Festival	September 9, 2006	3	5:00	Kyiv, Ukraine	Flyweight debut.

== Kickboxing record ==
14 wins (? KOs), 6 losses, 0 draws
Date	Result	Opponent	Event	Location	Method	Round	Time	Record
2019-12-07	Win	(France) Cindy Silvestre	LVIV Open Cup	Lviv, Ukraine	Decision	5	3:00	14-6
Wins WBC Muaythai Featherweight Championship.
2016-06-11	Win	(Greece) Chara Dimitroula	WKF Santorini Cup 2016	Santorini, Greece	Decision	5	3:00	13-6
Wins WKF Super Bantamweight Women's Championship.
2015-04-05	Win	(Italy) Patrizia Gibelli	Lion Belt 5	France	Decision	5	3:00	12-6
Wins Boxxtomoi Muaythai Women's Championship.
2014-07-19	Win	(England) Ruth Ashdown	WCK Muay Thai: Hot Summer Fights 2014	Cabazon, California USA	Decision (unanimous)	5	3:00	11-6
Win WBC Muaythai Women's World Flyweight title.
2014-06-28	Loss	(Poland) Sylwia Juśkiewicz	Fight Exclusive Night 3	Wrocław, Poland	Decision	3	3:00	10-6
2014-01-25	Loss	(China) Xiong Jingnan	Kunlun Fight 1	Pattaya, Thailand	Decision (split)	3	3:00	10-5
2013-09-07	Win	(Ukraine) Natalia Leskiv	Gas Station Fight Club	Lviv, Ukraine	KO	1		10-4
2013-08-24	Win	(United States) Emily Bearden	WCK Muay Thai: Hot Summer Fights	Temecula, California, USA	Decision	5	3:00	9-4
Wins the IKKC Women's World Super Bantamweight Muay Thai Championship.
2012-11-11	Loss	(China) Tang Jin	WCK Muay Thai: Matter of Pride	Las Vegas, Nevada, USA	Decision (unanimous)	3	5:00	8-4
2012-08-18	Win	(United States) Kealani Vanderleest	WCK Muay Thai: Nakamoto vs. Kitchen	Pala, California, USA	Decision (unanimous)	4	3:00
2011-10-22	Loss	(United States) Tiffany van Soest	WCK Muay Thai	Las Vegas, Nevada, USA	TKO (broken hand)	2	3:00
2010-12-18	Win	(China) Li Xiao	WCK Muay Thai: Chinese Grand Prix 2010 (Day 1)	Haikou, China	Decision (unanimous)	5	3:00
2010-11-20	Loss	(Germany) Christine Theiss	Steko's Fight Night	Dresden, Germany	KO	6
For the WKA Women's World Championship.
2010-04-17	Win	(Austria) Elke Beinwachs		Vienna, Austria	KO (right body kick)	3	2:00
Wins the WKF Women's World Super Bantamweight (-56.4 kg/124 lb) Muay Thai Championship.
2009-12-13	Loss	(Poland) Joanna Gutowska	Runda Zero Fight Night	Tarczyn, Poland	Decision	3	3:00
2009-00-00	Win	(Morocco)			Decision
Wins the ISKA Women's World Super Bantamweight (56.4 kg/124 lb) Oriental Championship.
0000-00-00	Win	(China) Ting Ting Jiang	WCK Muay Thai	Haikou, China

Amateur kickboxing record
Date	Result	Opponent	Event	Location	Method	Round	Time
2010-05-27	Win	(Croatia) Nevenka Mikulić	I.F.M.A. European Muaythai Championships 2010 –54 kg	Velletri, Italy	Decision	4	2:00
2010-04-10	Draw	(Poland) Monika Porażyńska	Kalisz Mayor's Cup	Kalisz, Poland	Draw	3	2:00
2010-02-00	Win	(Ukraine) Tarnavskaya	2010 IFMA Ukrainian Championships, Quarter Finals	Odessa, Ukraine	TKO	2
2009-11-21	Win	(Poland) Wojas Marzena	Kalisz Mayor's Cup	Kalisz, Poland	Decision	3	2:00
2009-05-24	Loss	(Czech Republic) Alena Holá	WAKO World Cup 2009, Semi Finals	Hungary	Decision
2009-00-00	Loss	(Poland) Joanna Gutowska	Latvia Open 2009	Latvia	TKO (right hook)	1

Legend: Win Loss Draw/No contest Notes

== See also ==
- List of female kickboxers
- List of female mixed martial artists
- List of WBC Muaythai female world champions
