= Balara =

Balara may refer to:

- Balhara (disambiguation)
- Balara, Nepal
- Balara, a village in Bangladesh
- Balaran, Sikar - Balara (Hindi: बळारा), a small town in Laxmangarh tehsil of Sikar district in Rajasthan, India. Location" Latitude: 26° 18' 0 N Longitude: 74° 4' 60 E.
- Balara, a village in Pali district in Rajasthan, India
