= 2014–2016 in SFL numbered events =

Mixed martial arts events

Super Fight League has scheduled several fights cards throughout 2014 to 2016:

== List of events ==
| Card | Date | Venue | City |
|---|---|---|---|
| SFL - Warriors | March 30, 2014 | Bombay Exhibition Centre | Mumbai, India |
| SFL 35: America 1 | October 4, 2014 | Emerald Queen Casino | Tacoma, Washington, United States |
| SFL 36: America 2 | December 13, 2014 | Emerald Queen Casino | Tacoma, Washington, United States |
| SFL 37: America 3 | February 21, 2015 | Emerald Queen Casino | Tacoma, Washington, United States |
| SFL 38: India vs. Pakistan | February 27, 2015 | Dubai | United Arab Emirates |
| SFL 39: BodyPower Expo | March 22, 2015 | Bombay Exhibition Centre | Mumbai, India |
| SFL 40: America 4 | April 25, 2015 | Emerald Queen Casino | Tacoma, Washington, United States |
| SFL 41: America 5 | July 11, 2015 | Emerald Queen Casino | Tacoma, Washington, United States |
| SFL 42: Fight Night at the Corral | August 15, 2015 | Stampede Corral | Calgary, Alberta, Canada |
| SFL 43: Capital Collision | September 26, 2015 | Hyatt Regency | Gurgaon, India |
| SFL 44: America 6 | September 26, 2015 | Emerald Queen Casino | Tacoma, Washington, United States |
| SFL 45: America 7 | December 12, 2015 | Emerald Queen Casino | Tacoma, Washington, United States |
| SFL 46: America 8 | February 20, 2016 | Emerald Queen Casino | Tacoma, Washington, United States |
| SFL 47 | March 18, 2016 | Jawaharlal Nehru Stadium - The Grub Fest | New Delhi, India |
| SFL 48 | March 26, 2016 | JLN Stadium - The Grub Fest | Pune, India |
| SFL 49: America 9 (Seattle vs. Portland) | May 7, 2016 | Emerald Queen Casino | Tacoma, Washington, USA |
| SFL 50: America 10 (Seattle vs. Los Angeles) | July 23, 2016 | Emerald Queen Casino | Tacoma, Washington, USA |
| SFL 51: America 11 (Seattle vs. Central Valley) | October 22, 2016 | Emerald Queen Casino | Tacoma, Washington, USA |
| SFL 53: Cage Sport 43 | December 17, 2016 | Emerald Queen Casino | Tacoma, Washington, USA |

== Event summaries ==
=== SFL - Warriors ===
SFL Warriors took place on March 30, 2014 in Mumbai, India. As with the previous events, it was streamed on YouTube, on TEN Sports in India and on the Fight Network in Canada.

Fight Card

Card
| Weight class | | | | Method | Round | Time | Notes |
|---|---|---|---|---|---|---|---|
| Flyweight | Anup Kumar | def. | Irfan Khan | Decision (Unanimous) | 3 | 5:00 |
| Bantamweight | Dhruv Chaudhary | def. | Mohammed Farhad Rafiq | TKO (punches) | 2 | 4:40 |
| Lightweight | Siddharth Chandanshive | def. | Mukesh Gora | Submission (arm triangle choke) | 1 | 1:07 |
| Light Heavyweight | Sandeep Kumar | def. | Deepak Kumar Singh | Submission (guillotine choke) | 1 | 0:56 |
| Featherweight | Abdul Muneer | def. | Sandeep Kumar | KO (punch) | 1 | 0:16 |
| Lightweight | Rajinder Singh Meena | def. | Sumeet Khade | Submission (guillotine choke) | 1 | 0:16 |

=== SFL 35 ===
SFL 35 took place on October 4, 2014 in Tacoma, Washington, USA. As with the previous events, it was streamed on YouTube, on TEN Sports in India and on the Fight Network in Canada.

Background

This was the inaugural event in the United States of America.

Fight Card

Card
| Weight class | | | | Method | Round | Time | Notes |
|---|---|---|---|---|---|---|---|
| Lightweight | Raven Guice | vs. | Jesse Hardenbrook | No Contest (fighters fell out of cage) | 1 | 2:57 |
| Women's Bantamweight | Cheryl Chan | def. | Hadley Griffith | Submission (rear naked choke) | 3 | 2:04 |
| Middleweight | Mike Devose | def. | Cleo Anderson | Decision (unanimous) | 3 | 5:00 |
| Welterweight | Adam Walkemeyer | def. | Michael Marcinko | Submission (rear naked choke) | 1 | 3:17 |
| Lightweight | Mike Ross | def. | Trent Tyler | Decision (split) | 3 | 5:00 |
| Lightweight | Bobby McIntyre | def. | Gary Winslow | Submission (D'Arce Choke) | 1 | 0:26 |
| Women's Bantamweight | Colleen Schneider | def. | Brenda Gonzales | Decision (unanimous) | 5 | 5:00 | (Note: Inaugural SFL America Women's Bantamweight Championship) |
| Bantamweight | Victor Henry | def. | Cory Vom Baur | Submission (arm bar) | 1 | 4:43 | (Note: Inaugural SFL America Bantamweight Championship) |

=== SFL 36 ===
SFL 36: America 2 took place on December 13, 2014 in Tacoma, Washington, USA. As with the previous events, it was streamed on YouTube, on TEN Sports in India and on the Fight Network in Canada.

Background

This was the 2nd event in the United States of America.

Fight Card

Card
| Weight class | | | | Method | Round | Time | Notes |
|---|---|---|---|---|---|---|---|
| Lightweight | Woo Johnson | def. | Joshua LaGrange | Submission (verbal) | 1 | 1:07 |
| Women's Flyweight | Jenny Liou Shriver | def. | Susy Watson | Decision (unanimous) | 3 | 5:00 |
| Welterweight | Trent Tyle | def. | Mike Devose | Submission (guillotine choke) | 1 | 2:41 |
| Lightweight | Albert Tadevosyan | vs. | Frankie Orr | Draw | 3 | 5:00 |
| Lightweight | Jason Novelli | def. | Jason Gray | Submission (guillotine choke) | 1 | 4:10 |
| Welterweight | Tyson Cunningham | vs. | Ben Fodor | Draw (majority) | 5 | 5:00 | (Note: Inaugural SFL America Welterweight Championship) |
| Lightweight | Julian Erosa | def. | Harrison Bevens | TKO | 2 | 2:10 | (Note: Inaugural SFL America Lightweight Championship) |

=== SFL 37 ===
SFL 37: America 3 took place on February 21, 2015 in Tacoma, Washington, USA. As with the previous events, it was streamed on YouTube, on TEN Sports in India and on the Fight Network in Canada.

Background

This was the 3rd event in the United States of America.

Fight Card

Card
| Weight class | | | | Method | Round | Time | Notes |
|---|---|---|---|---|---|---|---|
| Featherweight | Victor Barajas | def. | Shane Sargent | Submission (armbar) | 1 | n/a |
| Middleweight | Trent Tyler | def. | Kina Peneueta | Submission (arm triangle choke) | 1 | n/a |
| Lightweight | Bobby McIntyre | def. | William Hunt | TKO (punches) | 1 | n/a |
| Featherweight | Jesse Hardenbrook | def. | Aaron Martin | Submission (arm triangle choke) | 1 | 3:38 |
| Bantamweight | Paul Njoku | def. | Sean Gee | Decision (unanimous) | 3 | 5:00 |
| Bantamweight | Hector Lopez | def. | Arjay Murphy | Decision (unanimous) | 3 | 5:00 |
| Welterweight | Ben Fodor | def. | Jason Novelli | Technical Submission (rear naked choke) | 3 | 3:06 |
| Lightweight | Julian Erosa (c) | def. | Drew Brokenshire | Submission (brabo choke) | 3 | 4:35 | (Note: For the SFL America Lightweight Championship) |

=== SFL 38 ===
SFL 38: India vs. Pakistan took place on February 27, 2015 in the United Arab Emirates. As with the previous events, it was streamed on YouTube, on TEN Sports in India and on the Fight Network in Canada.

Background
This was the very first MMA event to feature fighters from India against fighters from Pakistan, standing from the long rivalry both nations have. It was also the first event the SFL hosted in the United Arab Emirates. Team India beat Team Pakistan by 6-1 & won the SFL Cup.

Fight Card

Card
| Weight class | | | | Method | Round | Time | Notes |
|---|---|---|---|---|---|---|---|
| Welterweight | (Bahrain) Mohammed Shahid | def. | (Pakistan) Prince Alamgeer Khan | TKO (punches) | 1 | 2:50 |
| Bantamweight | (India) Mohammed Farhad Rafiq | def. | (Pakistan) Abdullah Haiderzai | TKO (punches) | 2 | 1:12 |
| Featherweight | (India) Abdul Muneer | def. | (Pakistan) Ahmed Ali | KO (punch) | 1 | 0:48 |
| Welterweight | (Pakistan) Usman Butt | def. | (India) Bhabajeet Choudhury | DQ (kick to the head of grounded fighter) | 1 | 2:17 |
| Light Heavyweight | (India) Sandeep Kumar | def. | (Pakistan) Jerry James | TKO (punches) | 1 | 1:36 |
| Flyweight | (India) Anup Kumar | def. | (Pakistan) Shams Rehman | TKO (slam and elbows) | 1 | 0:46 |
| Middleweight | (India) Amit Thapa | def. | (Pakistan) Sameer Hassan Khan | TKO (punches) | 1 | 2:33 |

=== SFL 39 ===
SFL 39: BodyPower Expo took place on March 22, 2015 in Mumbai, India. As with the previous events, it will be streamed on YouTube, on TEN Sports in India and on the Fight Network in Canada.

Fight Card

Card
| Weight class | | | | Method | Round | Time | Notes |
|---|---|---|---|---|---|---|---|
| Bantamweight | Dhruv Chaudhary | def. | Navjot Chahal | TKO (punches) | 2 | 4:05 |
| Flyweight | Govind Singh | def. | Mohd Asgar | TKO (punches) | 1 | 2:59 |
| Welterweight | Vikas Singh Ruhil | def. | Zoramm Awia | Submission (rear naked choke) | 1 | 1:07 |
| Flyweight | Khurshid Moin | def. | Zorin Mawiia | Decision (unanimous) | 3 | 5:00 |
| Featherweight | Nikhil Bhatt | def. | Manish Kumar | TKO (punches) | 1 | 2:12 |
| Bantamweight | Mohammed Farhad Rafiq | def. | Praveen Malik | KO (head kick) | 1 | 1:26 |
| Welterweight | Shyam Prasad | def. | Brijesh Kumar Meena | Submission (triangle choke) | 1 | 1:24 |

=== SFL 40 ===
SFL 40: America 4 took place on April 25, 2015 in Tacoma, Washington. As with the previous events, it will be streamed on YouTube, on TEN Sports in India and on the Fight Network in Canada.

Fight Card

Card
| Weight class | | | | Method | Round | Time | Notes |
|---|---|---|---|---|---|---|---|
| Featherweight | Justin Mark | def. | Shane Sargent | Submission (rear naked choke) | 1 | 0:58 |
| Lightweight | Jake Jokela | def. | Mike Ross | Submission (rear naked choke) | 1 | 3:44 |
| Women's Flyweight | Susy Watson | def. | Ciara Irvine | Submission (rear naked choke) | 1 | 3:29 |
| Welterweight | Corey Watson | def. | Artiom Cula | Submission (kimura) | 3 | 2:53 |
| Bantamweight | Tony Reyes | def. | Victor Barajas | Submission (rear naked choke) | 1 | 4:02 |
| Welterweight | John Heath | def. | Trent Tyler | TKO (punches) | 1 | 3:19 |
| Bantamweight | Gurdarshan Mangat | def. | Hector Lopez | Submission (rear naked choke) | 1 | 3:00 |
| Lightweight | Drew Brokenshire | def. | Jason Gray | TKO (knees & punches) | 3 | 2:50 |

=== SFL 41 ===
SFL 41: America 5 took place on July 11, 2015 in Tacoma, Washington. As with the previous events, it was streamed on YouTube, on TEN Sports in India and on the Fight Network in Canada.

Fight Card

Card
| Weight class | | | | Method | Round | Time | Notes |
|---|---|---|---|---|---|---|---|
| Featherweight | Kody Kramer | def. | Tony Reyes | Decision (unanimous) | 3 | 5:00 |
| Featherweight | Vince Morales | def. | Jeremie Montgomery | TKO (punches) | 1 | 2:28 |
| Lightweight | Woo Johnson | def. | Chris Aparicio | Submission (rear naked choke) | 3 | 4:40 |
| Welterweight | Corey Watson | def. | Adam Walkemeyer | Submission (arm triangle choke) | 1 | 1:19 |
| Lightweight | Jason Novelli | def. | Bobby McIntyre | Submission (rear naked choke) | 2 | 4:16 |
| Welterweight | Tyson Cunningham | def. | Mike Dubois | Submission (Von Flue choke) | 2 | 1:13 | (Note: Inaugural SFL America Welterweight Championship) |
| Lightweight | Justin Harrington | def. | Harrison Bevens | TKO | 2 | 4:59 | (Note: Vacant SFL America Lightweight Championship) |

=== SFL 42 ===
SFL 42: Fight Night at the Corral took place on August 15, 2015 in Calgary, Alberta. This was the Canadian debut event for Super Fight League. As with the previous events, it was streamed on YouTube, on TEN Sports in India and on the Fight Network in Canada.

Fight Card

Card
| Weight class | | | | Method | Round | Time | Notes |
|---|---|---|---|---|---|---|---|
| Light Heavyweight | Steve Roy | def. | Dan Juricic | KO (punches) | 1 | 0:50 |
| Women's Flyweight | Rachael Swatez | def. | Chaleur Jones | Submission (triangle choke) | 1 | 3:34 |
| Welterweight | Matt Krayco | def. | Justin Schmit | Submission (triangle choke) | 1 | 3:34 |
| Middleweight | Chase Degenhardt | def. | Micah Brakefield | TKO (punches) | 1 | 3:28 | (Note: For the SFL Middleweight Championship) |
| Bantamweight | Jesse Arnett | def. | Roland Delorme | TKO (punches) | 2 | 3:00 |

=== SFL 43 ===
SFL 43: Capital Collision took place on September 26, 2015 in Gurgaon, India. As with the previous events, it was streamed on YouTube, on TEN Sports in India and on the Fight Network in Canada.

Fight Card

Card
| Weight class | | | | Method | Round | Time | Notes |
|---|---|---|---|---|---|---|---|
| Lightweight | Krishan Rawat | def. | Vikas Singh | Submission (rear naked choke) | 1 |
| Women's Strawweight | Daisy Singh | def. | Lalvenhimi | Submission (rear naked choke) | 1 | 1:26 |
| Featherweight | Gaurav Gulliya | def. | Nikhil Bhatt | Submission (standing rear naked choke) | 1 | 2:39 |
| Bantamweight | Mohd Farhad Rafiq | def. | Pushpendra Singh | TKO (punches) | 2 | 1:11 |
| Flyweight | Kapil Kumar | def. | Irfan Khan | Submission (rear naked choke) | 2 | 1:55 |
| Welterweight | Seth Rosario | def. | Shyam Prasad | TKO (punch) | 2 | 0:34 |
| Flyweight | Govind Ale | def. | Anup Kumar | Decision (unanimous) | 3 | 5:00 |
| Welterweight | Amitesh Chaubey | def. | Jason Solomon | TKO (punch) | 1 | 0:09 | (Note: For the SFL Welterweight Championship) |

=== SFL 44 ===
SFL 44: America 6 took place on September 26, 2015 in Tacoma, Washington, USA. As with the previous events, it was streamed on YouTube, on TEN Sports in India and on the Fight Network in Canada.

Fight Card

Card
| Weight class | | | | Method | Round | Time | Notes |
|---|---|---|---|---|---|---|---|
| Welterweight | Dylan Potter | def. | John Aparicio | Submission (armbar) | 1 | 1:34 |
| Lightweight | Thomas Pierce Jr. | def. | Jesse Hardenbrook | Submission (rear naked choke) | 2 | 2:21 |
| Featherweight | Jeremie Montgomery | def. | Jadon Johnson | TKO | 1 | 1:26 |
| Bantamweight | Lyndon Hirai | def. | Allan Nicolausen | TKO | 2 | 2:41 |
| Women's Strawweight | Jenny Liou Shriver | def. | Heather Denny | Submission (armbar) | 1 | 4:01 |
| Featherweight | Daniel Swain | def. | Drew Brokenshire | Submission (triangle choke) | 3 | 2:04 |
| Light Heavyweight | Alfonso Gonzales | def. | Thomas Hoeper | TKO | 2 | 1:29 |
| Lightweight | Justin Harrington | def. | Bobby McIntyre | Submission (triangle choke) | 1 | 2:25 | (Note: For the SFL American Lightweight Championship) |

=== SFL 45 ===
SFL 45: America 7 took place on December 12, 2015 in Tacoma, Washington, USA. As with the previous events, it was streamed on YouTube, on TEN Sports in India and on the Fight Network in Canada.

Fight Card

Card
| Weight class | | | | Method | Round | Time | Notes |
|---|---|---|---|---|---|---|---|
| Light Heavyweight | Thomas Hoeper | def. | Rob Burgess | Submission (guillotine choke) | 1 | 4:46 |
| Light Heavyweight | Rafael Brewster | def. | Nate Cook | Submission (front choke) | 1 | 1:36 |
| Lightweight | Patrick Benson | def. | Kody Kramer | Submission (knee bar) | 2 | 0:38 |
| Middleweight | Dylan Potter | def. | Artiom Cula | KO | 1 | 2:41 |
| Bantamweight | Journey Newson | def. | Justin Hugo | Submission (triangle choke) | 1 | 2:17 |
| Featherweight | Eric Cronkhite | def. | Daniel Elliot | Submission (rear naked choke) | 2 | 4:30 |
| Light Heavyweight | Brent Knopp | def. | Jordan Currie | TKO | 2 | 5:00 |
| Women's Strawweight | Amy Montenegro | def. | Glena Avila | Decision (split) | 5 | 5:00 | (Note: For the SFL America Women's Strawweight Championship) |

=== SFL 46 ===
SFL 46: America 8 took place on February 20, 2016 in Tacoma, Washington, USA. As with the previous events, it was streamed on YouTube, on TEN Sports in India and on the Fight Network in Canada.

Fight Card

Card
| Weight class | | | | Method | Round | Time | Notes |
|---|---|---|---|---|---|---|---|
| Flyweight | Anthony Zender | def. | Luiz Gomez | TKO | 2 | 1:14 |
| Welterweight | Ryan Schecterson | def. | Nick Coughran | Decision (unanimous) | 3 | 5:00 |
| Middleweight | Dylan Potter | def. | Rob Burgess | Submission (armbar) | 2 | 2:20 |
| Lightweight | David Purnell Jr. | vs. | Thomas Pierce Jr. | No Contest (eye poke) | 2 | 0:33 |
| Bantamweight | Justin Hugo | def. | Jon Marc Cortez | Submission (armbar) | 2 | 4:16 |
| Featherweight | Jeremie Montgomery | def. | Armando Best | Submission (D'arce Choke) | 2 | 3:49 |
| Welterweight | Joey Pierotti | def. | Fay Bursell | Submission (rear naked choke) | 1 | 1:09 |
| Lightweight | Patrick Benson | def. | Jason Gray | Submission (triangle choke) | 1 | 3:23 |
| Light Heavyweight | Jared Torgeson | def. | Brent Knopp | Decision (unanimous) | 3 | 5:00 |

=== SFL 47 ===
SFL 47 took place on March 18, 2016 in New Delhi, India. As with the previous events, it was streamed on YouTube, on TEN Sports in India and on the Fight Network in Canada.

Fight Card

Card
| Weight class | | | | Method | Round | Time | Notes |
|---|---|---|---|---|---|---|---|
| Flyweight | Kapil Kumar | def. | Sachin Panwar | Decision (unanimous) | 3 | 5:00 |
| Featherweight | Dhruv Chaudhary | def. | Amit Goswami | Submission (rear naked choke) | 1 | 2:30 |
| Women's Strawweight | Daisy Singh | def. | Bharti Dhoundiyal | Submission (armbar) | 1 | 0:44 |
| Welterweight | Ashish Chaudhary | def. | Jamshed Khan | Submission (guillotine choke) | 1 | 2:34 |
| Welterweight | Kantharaj Agasa | def. | Mukesh Gora | Decision (unanimous) | 3 | 5:00 |

=== SFL 48 ===
SFL 48 took place on March 26, 2016 in Pune, India. As with the previous events, it was streamed on YouTube, on TEN Sports in India and on the Fight Network in Canada.

Fight Card

Card
| Weight class | | | | Method | Round | Time | Notes |
|---|---|---|---|---|---|---|---|
| Bantamweight | Arshiyan Memon | def. | Parveen Kumar | Submission (reverse guillotine choke) | 2 | 1:48 |
| Bantamweight | Dhruv Chaudhary | def. | Pardeep Singh | Submission (armbar) | 1 | 2:30 |
| Welterweight | Amit Kumar | def. | Ashish Chaudhary | KO/TKO | 1 | 0:11 |
| Lightweight | Farhad Hazratzada | def. | Sandeep Yadav | Submission (rear naked choke) | 1 | 4:21 |

=== SFL 49 ===
SFL 49: America 9 (Seattle vs. Portland) took place on May 7, 2016 in Tacoma, Washington, USA. As with the previous events, it was streamed on YouTube, on TEN Sports in India and on the Fight Network in Canada.

Fight Card

Card
| Weight class | | | | Method | Round | Time | Notes |
|---|---|---|---|---|---|---|---|
| Bantamweight | Journey Newson | def. | Shane Friesz | Decision (unanimous) | 3 | 5:00 |
| Women's Flyweight | Liz Tracy | def. | Cindy Hales | TKO |
| Welterweight | Joey Pierotti | def. | Chris Evens | TKO |
| Middleweight | Rafael Brewster | def. | Jose McKay Rodriguez | KO |
| Lightweight | Justin Harrington (c) | def. | Bryan Nuro | Decision (unanimous) | 5 | 5:00 | (Note: For the SFL American Lightweight Championship) |

=== SFL 50 ===
SFL 50: America 10 (Seattle vs. Los Angeles) took place on July 23, 2016 in Tacoma, Washington, USA. As with the previous events, it was streamed on YouTube, on TEN Sports in India and on the Fight Network in Canada.

Fight Card

Card
| Weight class | | | | Method | Round | Time | Notes |
|---|---|---|---|---|---|---|---|
| Welterweight | Austin Anderson | def. | Ryan Schecterson | Submission (triangle choke) | 2 | 4:33 |
| Featherweight | Nathan Stolen | def. | Jeremie Montgomery | KO/TKO (punch) | 1 | 1:34 |
| Bantamweight | Anthony Zender | def. | Brandon Frunk | Decision (split) | 3 | 5:00 |
| Featherweight | A.J. Bryant | def. | Armando Best | KO/TKO (punches) | 1 | 2:14 |
| Women's Flyweight | Sarah D'Alelio | def. | Jenny Liou | Decision (unanimous) | 3 | 5:00 |
| Lightweight | Shohei Yamamoto | def. | Bobby McIntyre | KO/TKO (punches) | 2 | 0:46 |
| Light Heavyweight | Thomas Hoeper | def. | Dylan Potter | KO/TKO (punches) | 2 | 4:27 |
| 195 lbs catchweight | Brent Knopp | def. | Adam Dehart | Decision (unanimous) | 5 | 5:00 |

=== SFL 51 ===
SFL 51: America 11 (Seattle Warriors vs. Central Valley Heat) took place on October 22, 2016 in Tacoma, Washington, USA. As with the previous events, it was streamed on YouTube, on TEN Sports in India and on the Fight Network in Canada.

Fight Card

Card
| Weight class | | | | Method | Round | Time | Notes |
|---|---|---|---|---|---|---|---|
| Featherweight | Jorge Gaitan | def. | Armando Best | Decision (unanimous) | 3 | 5:00 |
| Featherweight | Nathan Stolen | def. | A.J. Bryant | Submission |
| Welterweight | Joey Pierotti | def. | Richard Brooks | TKO |
| Women's Flyweight | Liz Tracy | def. | Christine Stanley | Decision (split) | 3 | 5:00 |
| Middleweight | Mike Persons | def. | Dylan Potter | TKO |
| Heavyweight | Jordan Powell | def. | Jordan Currie | Submission |
| 192 lbs Catchweight | Josh Clark | def. | Brent Knopp | KO |
| 140 lbs Catchweight | Anthony Zender | def. | Nathan Thompson | Decision (unanimous) | 3 | 5:00 |

=== SFL 53: Cage Sport 43 ===
SFL 53: Cage Sport 43 took place on December 17, 2016 in Tacoma, Washington, USA. As with the previous events, it was streamed on YouTube, on TEN Sports in India and on the Fight Network in Canada.

Fight Card

Card
| Weight class | | | | Method | Round | Time | Notes |
|---|---|---|---|---|---|---|---|
| Bantamweight | Sean Gee | def. | Rodney Kealohi | Submission (guillotine choke) | 3 | 0:59 |
| 140 lbs Catchweight | Dylan Atkinson | def. | Daniel Elliot | Submission (north-south choke) | 2 | 4:51 |
| 140 lbs Catchweight | Journey Newson | def. | Anthony Zender | Submission (guillotine choke) | 3 | 1:27 |
| Lightweight | JD Burns | def. | Patrick Benson | Submission (triangle choke) | 1 | 2:37 |
| Lightweight | Ikaika Tampos | def. | Chris Stone | Decision (unanimous) | 3 | 5:00 |
| Featherweight | Drew Brokenshire | def. | Eduardo Torres | Decision (unanimous) | 3 | 5:00 |
| Lightweight | Bryan Nuro | def. | Bobby McIntyre | Submission (rear naked choke) | 1 | 3:22 | (Note: For the Interim SFL American Lightweight Championship) |
