= Vallabhipura =

Vallabhipur(a) may refer to the following entities in western India :

- Vala State, a former princely state in Eastern Kathiawara (Gujarat)
- its capital Vala, modern Val(l)abhi

== See also ==
- Vallabha (disambiguation)
