= Vallabha (disambiguation) =

Vallabha (1478–1530) was an Indian philosopher.

Vallabha or Vallabh may also refer to:

- Vallabha (name), a list of people with the name
- Vishnuvallabha, a name for Ocimum tenuiflorum
- Vallabha (title), a title used by several kings
- Ganesha, also known as Vallabha, a Hindu deity

== See also ==
- Balhara (title), Arabic transliteration of the name and title
- Prithvi Vallabh (disambiguation)
- Vallabhipura (disambiguation)
- Vallavan, a 2006 Indian Tamil-language film
