= 2013 in SFL numbered events =

Mixed martial arts events

2013 is the second year for Super Fight League, an Indian-based mixed martial arts (MMA) league. Whilst the SFL began holding events from 22 February with their SFL Contenders event, which are untelevised events that take place in the SFL Training Centre as a way to build up the fighters before bringing forward to a television audience, the promotion made their televised return with SFL 14 on 29 March, which was headlined by two title fights between Xavier Foupa-Pokam and John Troyer for the middleweight title, and Sanja Sucevic and Colleen Schneider for the women's flyweight title. The same event was also their first on ESPN Star Sports in India.

Super Fight League has scheduled several fights cards throughout 2013:

Card	Date	Venue	City
SFL 14	29 March 2013	SFL Challengers Arena	Mumbai, India
SFL 16	26 April 2013	SFL Challengers Arena	Mumbai, India
SFL 17	10 May 2013	SFL Challengers Arena	Mumbai, India
SFL 18	24 May 2013	SFL Challengers Arena	Mumbai, India
SFL 19	7 June 2013	SFL Challengers Arena	Mumbai, India
SFL 20-21	3 August 2013	Filmalaya Studios	Mumbai, India
SFL 22-23	17 August 2013	Filmalaya Studios	Mumbai, India
SFL 24-25	31 August 2013	Filmalaya Studios	Mumbai, India
SFL 26-27	14 September 2013	Filmalaya Studios	Mumbai, India
SFL 28-29	28 September 2013	Filmalaya Studios	Mumbai, India
SFL 30-31	12 October 2013	Filmalaya Studios	Mumbai, India
SFL 32-33	26 October 2013	Filmalaya Studios	Mumbai, India
SFL 34	15 November 2013	Filmalaya Studios	Mumbai, India

== Event summaries ==
=== SFL 14 ===
SFL 14 took place on 29 March 2013 in Mumbai, India. As with the previous events, it streamed live on YouTube and on the Fight Network in Canada. It was also the first event shown on STAR Sports in India. The Super Fight League rewarded 2 titles in the men's Middleweight and women's Flyweight divisions at this event.

Results

Card
Weight class				Method	Round	Time	Notes
Bantamweight	Irfan Khan	def.	Pushpender Singh	Decision (unanimous)	3	5:00
Welterweight	Vikas Singh Ruhil	def.	Mohammed Shahid	DQ (illegal knee to grounded opponent)	1	0:20
Bantamweight	Sharath Babu	def.	Atif Mohammad Kadim	Decision (unanimous)	3	5:00
Welterweight	Baz Muhammad Mubarez	def.	Haitham Tantawy	TKO (knees and punches)	3	1:38
Welterweight	Jason Ramesh Solomon	def.	Rouhollah Eidehlouei	TKO (Submission to punches)	1	2:33
Women's Flyweight	Colleen Schneider	def.	Sanja Sucevic	Submission (keylock)	3	2:54	(Note: For the 1st SFL World Women's Flyweight Championship)
Middleweight	Xavier Foupa-Pokam	def.	John Troyer	TKO (knee to the body)	1	2:15	(Note: For the 1st SFL World Middleweight Championship)

=== SFL 15 ===
SFL 15 took place on 12 April 2013 in Mumbai, India. As with the previous events, it streamed live on YouTube and was shown on STAR Sports in India and on the Fight Network in Canada.

2012 London Olympics Freestyle Wrestling Silver medallist Sushil Kumar was in attendance as a commentator for this event.

Results

Card
Weight class				Method	Round	Time	Notes
Bantamweight	Kapil Kumar	def.	Alam Idrisi	Submission (guillotine choke)	1	1:50
Bantamweight	Uchit Sharma	def.	Kaushik Sen	TKO (doctor stoppage)	1	2:15
Bantamweight	Narender Grewal	def.	Aadil Bashir	Submission (rear-naked choke)	1	1:00
Bantamweight	Johny Ryntathiang	def.	Mahesh Kumar Baliyan	Submission (armbar)	1	1:03
Lightweight	Ricky Sahni	def.	Deen Mohammad Jorat	TKO (retirement)	2	5:00
Women's Flyweight	Manjit Kolekar	def.	Mona Mounir Mohamed	TKO (punches)	1	2:19
Middleweight	Michael Page	def.	Ramdan Mohamed	Submission (rear-naked choke)	1	3:48

=== SFL 16 ===
SFL 16 took place on 26 April 2013 in Mumbai, India. As with the previous events, it streamed live on YouTube, on STAR Sports in India and on the Fight Network in Canada.

Results

Card
Weight class				Method	Round	Time	Notes
Lightweight	Sandeep Yadav	def.	Arun Singh Charak	Submission (guillotine choke)	3	0:35
Flyweight	Arun Nagar	def.	Manoj Chuhan	Decision (split)	3	5:00
Bantamweight	Irfan Khan	def.	Sachin Panwar	Decision (unanimous)	3	5:00
Light Heavyweight	Amit Thapa	def.	Sandeep Kumar	TKO (punches)	1	3:34
Welterweight	Mohammed Shahid	def.	Abdul Hamid	TKO (knees)	3	3:17
Women's Flyweight	Lena Ovchynnikova	def.	Fathia Mostafa	Submission (guillotine choke)	1	3:36
Lightweight	Sascha Sharma	def.	Marca Gomez Sariol	Decision (unanimous)	3	5:00

=== SFL 17 ===
SFL 17 took place on 10 May 2013 in Mumbai, India. As with the previous events, it streamed live on YouTube, on STAR Sports in India and on the Fight Network in Canada.

Fight Card

Card
Weight class				Method	Round	Time	Notes
Featherweight	Abdul Muneer	def.	Pawan Goyat	Submission (rear-naked choke)	1	3:29
Middleweight	Satendar Bankura	def.	Harvinder Rana	KO (Punch)	1	1:18
Welterweight	Charanjit Singh	def.	Yash Kumar	TKO (strikes)	2	4:45
Lightweight	Amitesh Chaubey	def.	Saeed Asghartabar	Decision (unanimous)	3	5:00
Women's Strawweight	Daizy Singh	def.	Ola Ahmed	Submission (choke)	2	0:43
Heavyweight	Mohamed Abdel Karim	def.	Daniel Amar Singh	TKO (punches)	3	3:40
Bantamweight	Tom McKenna	def.	Anup Kumar (c)	Submission (rear-naked choke)	1	4:46	(Note: For SFL World Bantamweight Championship)

=== SFL 18 ===
SFL 18 took place on 24 May 2013 in Mumbai, India. As with the previous events, it was streamed live on YouTube, on STAR Sports in India and on the Fight Network in Canada.

Fight Card

Card
Weight class				Method	Round	Time	Notes
Welterweight	Mohammad Naemi	def.	Vladimir Prodanovic	Decision (unanimous)	3	5:00
Flyweight	Sachin Panwar	def.	Uchit Sharma	TKO (retirement)	2	5:00
Light Heavyweight	Sandeep Kumar	def.	Samarveer Mavi	TKO (punches)	1	0:52
Flyweight	Arun Nagar	def.	Mohd Asgar	KO (punches)	1	2:41
Welterweight	Pawan Maan Singh	def.	Jamshed Khan	Submission (guillotine choke)	1	1:12
Featherweight	Philipp Schranz	def.	Mohamed Abdel Hamid	TKO (punches)	1	1:54
Women's Strawweight	Irene Cabello	def.	Ritika Singh	Submission (armbar)	1	2:06

=== SFL 19 ===
SFL 19 took place on 7 June 2013 in Mumbai, India. As with the previous events, it was streamed live on YouTube, on STAR Sports in India and on the Fight Network in Canada.

Fight Card

Card
Weight class				Method	Round	Time	Notes
Featherweight	Amit Raj Kumar	def.	Abhay Singh Shirole	TKO (punches)	1	2:55
Welterweight	Jason Ramesh Solomon	def.	Mayank Dogra	TKO (punches)	1	2:00
Welterweight	Bhabajeet Choudhury	def.	Iqbal Bhat	KO (head kick)	1	1:42
Women's Flyweight	Manjit Kolekar	def.	Monika Mallik	Decision (unanimous)	3	5:00
Bantamweight	Narender Grewal	def.	Abdul Azeem Badakhshi	Decision (unanimous)	3	5:00
Bantamweight	Irfan Khan	def.	Khwaja Mohibsa	Submission (rear naked choke)	1	2:17
Heavyweight	Singh Jaideep	def.	Alireza Tavakoli	TKO (elbows)	1	4:24

=== SFL 20-21 ===
On 3 August 2013, the Super Fight League hosted SFL 22 and SFL 23 on the same night, with their televised dates taking place one week after the other, as SFL 20 will air on 9 August, and SFL 21 will air on 16 August. The first four fights of the event will be considered SFL 20, and the later half of the event's fights will be SFL 21. This event will be the first to take place under the SFL's latest format and newly created 800-seat arena.

==== SFL 20 ====
SFL 20 will air on 9 August 2013 in Mumbai, India. As with the previous events, it will stream on YouTube, on STAR Sports in India and on the Fight Network in Canada.

Fight Card

Card
Weight class				Method	Round	Time	Notes
Lightweight	Amitesh Chaubey	def.	Nikhil Bhatt	TKO (punches)	2	0:59
Lightweight	Jason Ramesh Solomon	def.	Mukesh Choudhary	TKO (punches)	2	1:33
Featherweight	Amit Raj Kumar	def.	Vishal Singh	Submission (rear naked choke)	1	2:42
Bantamweight	Narender Grewal	def.	Tiran Thakshala	TKO (punches)	1	0:48

==== SFL 21 ====
SFL 21 will air on 16 August 2013 in Mumbai, India. As with the previous events, it will stream on YouTube, on STAR Sports in India and on the Fight Network in Canada.

Fight Card

Card
Weight class				Method	Round	Time	Notes
Bantamweight	Kuldeep Singh Sekhon	def.	Johny Ryntathiang	TKO (Submission to punches)	1	1:20
Flyweight	Kapil Kumar	def.	Sachin Panwar	Submission (rear naked choke)	2	2:27
Light Heavyweight	Sandeep Kumar	def.	Mohit Tokas	TKO (Submission to punches)	1	1:59
Featherweight	Bharat Khandare (c)	def.	Pierre Daguzan	TKO (punches)	2	1:44	(Note: For SFL World Featherweight Championship)

=== SFL 22-23 ===
On 17 August 2013, the Super Fight League will host SFL 22 and SFL 23 on the same night, with their televised dates taking place one week after the other, with SFL 22 airing on 23 August, and SFL 23 airing on 30 August.

==== SFL 22 ====
SFL 22 will air on 23 August 2013 in Mumbai, India. As with the previous events, it will stream on YouTube, on STAR Sports in India and on the Fight Network in Canada.

Fight Card

Card
Weight class				Method	Round	Time	Notes
Flyweight	Manoj Chauhan	def.	Uchit Sharma	Decision (unanimous)	3	5:00
Lightweight	Gaurav Gulliya	def.	Saeed Asghartabar	KO (punch)	3	0:38
Lightweight	Arun Singh Charak	def.	Vikas Singh Ruhil	KO (punch)	1	2:48
Lightweight	Pawan Maan Singh	def.	Rajinder Singh Meena (c)	Submission (kimura)	2	3:45	(Note: For SFL World Lightweight Championship)

==== SFL 23 ====
SFL 23 will air on 30 August 2013 in Mumbai, India. As with the previous events, it will stream on YouTube, on STAR Sports in India and on the Fight Network in Canada.

Fight Card

Card
Weight class				Method	Round	Time	Notes
Light Heavyweight	Amit Thapa	def.	Ankit Yadav	Submission (rear naked choke)	1	1:30
Women's Strawweight	Daizy Singh	def.	Ritika Singh	Decision (unanimous)	3	5:00
Featherweight	Sumeet Khade	def.	Dhruv Chaudhary	Decision (unanimous)	3	5:00
Bantamweight	Khwaja Mohibsa	def.	Irfan Khan	Decision (unanimous)	3	5:00

=== SFL 24-25 ===
On 31 August 2013, the Super Fight League will host SFL 24 and SFL 25 on the same night, with their televised dates taking place one week after the other, with SFL 24 airing on 6 September, and SFL 25 airing on 13 September.

==== SFL 24 ====
SFL 24 will air on 6 September 2013 in Mumbai, India. As with the previous events, it will stream on YouTube, on STAR Sports in India and on the Fight Network in Canada.

Fight Card

Card
Weight class				Method	Round	Time	Notes
Welterweight	Bhabajeet Choudhury	def.	Vicky Prasad Gupta	TKO (Submission to punches)	2	0:40
Middleweight	Suresh Rajput	def.	Abhijeet Petkar	DQ	1	2:08
Bantamweight	Raghvendra Singh	def.	Pushpender Singh	TKO (punches)	2	1:07
Flyweight	Anup Kumar	def.	Arun Nagar	Submission (rear naked choke)	2	2:38

==== SFL 25 ====
SFL 25 will air on 13 September 2013 in Mumbai, India. As with the previous events, it will stream on YouTube, on STAR Sports in India and on the Fight Network in Canada.

Fight Card

Card
Weight class				Method	Round	Time	Notes
Flyweight	Himanshu Kaushik	def.	Biswa Dev	Decision (unanimous)	3	5:00
Lightweight	Mukesh Choudhary	def.	Siddharth Chandanshive	TKO (punches)	2	0:52
Lightweight	Mehdi Nasirey	def.	Nirmal Kumar	TKO (punches)	1	0:24
Welterweight	Satendar Bankura	def.	Mohammed Shahid	Submission	1	0:52

=== SFL 26-27 ===
On 14 September 2013, the Super Fight League will host SFL 26 and SFL 27 on the same night, with their televised dates taking place one week after the other, with SFL 26 airing on 20 September, and SFL 27 airing on 27 September.

==== SFL 26 ====
SFL 26 will air on 20 September 2013 in Mumbai, India. As with the previous events, it will stream on YouTube, on STAR Sports in India and on the Fight Network in Canada.

Fight Card

Card
Weight class				Method	Round	Time	Notes
Lightweight	Sameer Shaikh	def.	Suraj Bahadur	Submission (arm triangle choke)	2	0:27
Featherweight	Abdul Muneer	def.	Mohan Lal	TKO (Submission to punches)	1	1:33
Featherweight	Ashleigh Grimshaw	def.	Masaya Doi	KO (punch)	1	2:22

==== SFL 27 ====
SFL 27 will air on 27 September 2013 in Mumbai, India. As with the previous events, it will stream on YouTube, on STAR Sports in India and on the Fight Network in Canada.

Fight Card

Card
Weight class				Method	Round	Time	Notes
Flyweight	Rakesh Dagar	def.	Mahesh Kumar Baliyan	Submission (keylock)	2	4:15
Bantamweight	Kuldeep Singh Sekhon	def.	Aadil Bashir	Submission (rear naked choke)	1	4:20
Flyweight	Anup Kumar	def.	Kapil Kumar	TKO (retirement)	1	5:00
Bantamweight	Narender Grewal	def.	Amr Abdel Malek Mahmoud	Submission (arm triangle choke)	1	3:25

=== SFL 28-29 ===
On 28 September 2013, the Super Fight League will host SFL 28 and SFL 29 on the same night, with their televised dates taking place one week after the other, with SFL 28 airing on 4 October, and SFL 29 airing on 11 October.

==== SFL 28 ====
SFL 28 will air on 4 October 2013 in Mumbai, India. As with the previous events, it will stream on YouTube, on STAR Sports in India and on the Fight Network in Canada.

Fight Card

Card
Weight class				Method	Round	Time	Notes
Bantamweight	Mohammed Farhad Rafiq	def.	Johny Ryntathiang	TKO (retirement)	1	2:38
Featherweight	Amit Raj Kumar	def.	Sameer Shaikh	Decision (unanimous)	3	5:00
Light Heavyweight	Sandeep Kumar	def.	Hemant Wadekar	TKO (punches)	1	4:20
Lightweight	Amitesh Chaubey	def.	Gaurav Gulliya	TKO (punches)	1	0:13

==== SFL 29 ====
SFL 29 will air on 11 October 2013 in Mumbai, India. As with the previous events, it will stream on YouTube, on STAR Sports in India and on the Fight Network in Canada.

Fight Card

Card
Weight class				Method	Round	Time	Notes
Lightweight	Mukesh Choudhary	def.	Vikas Singh Ruhil	TKO (punches)	2	0:26
Lightweight	Kuat Khamitov	def.	Baz Muhammad Mubarez	Decision	3	5:00
Bantamweight	Sameet Khade	def.	Nelson Paes	Submission (rear naked choke)	1	1:28
Featherweight	Bharat Khandare	def.	Sami Amin	Submission (rear naked choke)	2	3:06

=== SFL 30-31 ===
On 12 October 2013, the Super Fight League will host SFL 30 and SFL 31 on the same night, with their televised dates taking place one week after the other, with SFL 30 airing on 18 October, and SFL 31 airing on 25 October.

==== SFL 30 ====
SFL 30 will air on 18 October 2013 in Mumbai, India. As with the previous events, it will stream on YouTube, on STAR Sports in India and on the Fight Network in Canada.

Fight Card

Card
Weight class				Method	Round	Time	Notes
Middleweight	Ravindra Balhara	def.	Mohammad Younus	Decision (unanimous)	3	5:00
Atomweight	Jeet Toshi	def.	Praveen Kalkal	Submission (rear naked choke)	1	1:06
Lightweight	Pawan Goyat	def.	Swapnil Barve	KO (punch)	2	0:57
Bantamweight	Irfan Khan	def.	Manoj Chauhan	Submission (rear naked choke)	3	0:35

==== SFL 31 ====
SFL 31 will air on 25 October 2013 in Mumbai, India. As with the previous events, it will stream on YouTube, on STAR Sports in India and on the Fight Network in Canada.

Fight Card

Card
Weight class				Method	Round	Time	Notes
Lightweight	Rajinder Singh Meena	def.	Biki Bora	KO (punch)	1	0:13
Featherweight	Neeraj Goyat	def.	Mohammed Farhad Rafiq	Decision (unanimous)	3	5:00
Lightweight	Mehdi Nasirey	def.	Amit Kumar	TKO (punches)	1	2:43
Featherweight	Abdul Muneer	def.	Ahmed El Gharib	KO (punch)	1	0:56

=== SFL 32-33 ===
On 26 October 2013, the Super Fight League will host SFL 32 and SFL 33 on the same night, with their televised dates taking place one week after the other, with SFL 32 airing on 1 November, and SFL 33 airing on 8 November.

==== SFL 32 ====
SFL 32 will air on 1 November 2013 in Mumbai, India. As with the previous events, it will stream on YouTube, on STAR Sports in India and on the Fight Network in Canada.

Fight Card

Card
Weight class				Method	Round	Time	Notes
Lightweight	Pawan Goyat	def.	Sameer Shaikh	KO (punch)	1	0:21
Welterweight	Charanjit Singh	def.	Rakesh Singh Manhas	TKO (Submission to punches)	1	2:02
Bantamweight	Pushpender Singh	def.	Kuldeep Singh Sekhon	TKO (punches)	2	2:48
Lightweight	Mukesh Choudhary	def.	Amitesh Chaubey	Submission (rear naked choke)	2	0:35

==== SFL 33 ====
SFL 33 will air on 8 November 2013 in Mumbai, India. As with the previous events, it will stream on YouTube, on STAR Sports in India and on the Fight Network in Canada.

Background

The main event featured a Champion vs. Champion fight as the current SFL World Lightweight Champion Pawan Maan Singh challenged the current SFL World Welterweight Champion Shyam Prasad for Prasad's Welterweight Title.

Fight Card

Card
Weight class				Method	Round	Time	Notes
Light Heavyweight	Abhijeet Petkar	def.	Suresh Rajput	TKO (Submission to punches)	1	1:25
Heavyweight	Deepak Kumar Singh	def.	Love Chauhan	TKO (Submission to punches)	1	3:23
Lightweight	Mehdi Nasirey	def.	Nikhil Bhatt	Submission (guillotine choke)	2	1:29
Welterweight	Pawan Maan Singh	def.	Shyam Prasad	Submission (rear naked choke)	1	2:09	(Note: For SFL World Welterweight Championship)

=== SFL 34 ===
SFL 34 took place on 15 November 2013 in Mumbai, India. As with the previous events, it will stream on YouTube, on STAR Sports in India and on the Fight Network in Canada.

Background

Fight Card

Card
Weight class				Method	Round	Time	Notes
Flyweight	Rohit Pundeer	def.	Vinod Budhwar	KO	1	1:39
Bantamweight	Mohammed Farhad	def.	Raghvendra Singh	TKO	1	3:12
Bantamweight	Dhruv Chaudhary	def.	Govind Singh	Submission	1	2:51
Bantamweight	Manish Kumar	def.	Shaikh Mohammed Farhan	TKO	1	4:36
Bantamweight	Praveen Lohia	def.	Anuj Kumar	Submission	1	1:31
Flyweight	Pramod Khatri	def.	Arun Sharma	Submission	1	3:47

== See also ==
- Super Fight League
- 2013 in SFL Contenders events
