= 2012 in Super Fight League =

Mixed martial arts events

The year 2012 was the inaugural year for Super Fight League, an Indian-based mixed martial arts (MMA) league. Its first event was held in March and featured a bout between the two MMA veterans Bob Sapp and James Thompson. The league has scheduled several events to occur throughout India in 2012. On 5 August 2012, the Super Fight League aired their reality show SFL Challengers. Similar to the Ultimate Fighter, the show took young up-and-coming Indian mixed martial artists, placing them in the same house. On October 12, the Super Fight League changed their organisational structure from one event a month in arenas to one event every Friday in a specially designed mini-arena in Mumbai in front of an exclusive invitation only audience. With programming lasting for three hours each week with weigh-ins, live fights, and interviews from Bollywood cage side guests. There was seven fights in total each event, with one of them being a female bout. It aired live on Neo Prime in India and on their YouTube page for the rest of the world.

== List of events ==
Event	Date	Venue	City
Super Fight League 1	March 11, 2012	Andheri Sports Complex	Mumbai, India
Super Fight League 2	April 7, 2012	T-Box Mobile Arena	Chandigarh, India
Super Fight League 3	May 6, 2012	Indira Gandhi Indoor Stadium	New Delhi, India
Super Fight League 4	October 12, 2012	Super Fight League Arena	Mumbai, India
Super Fight League 5	October 19, 2012	Super Fight League Arena	Mumbai, India
Super Fight League 6	October 26, 2012	Super Fight League Arena	Mumbai, India
Super Fight League 7	November 2, 2012	Super Fight League Arena	Mumbai, India
Super Fight League 8	November 9, 2012	Super Fight League Arena	Mumbai, India
Super Fight League 9	November 16, 2012	Super Fight League Arena	Mumbai, India
Super Fight League 10	November 23, 2012	Super Fight League Arena	Mumbai, India
Super Fight League 11	November 30, 2012	Super Fight League Arena	Mumbai, India
Super Fight League 12	December 7, 2012	Super Fight League Arena	Mumbai, India
Super Fight League 13	December 14, 2012	Super Fight League Arena	Mumbai, India

== Event summaries ==
=== Super Fight League 1 ===
Super Fight League 1 was held on March 11, 2012 at the Andheri Sports Complex in Mumbai, India and was the first ever event promoted by Super Fight League. Prior to the event, Bollywood stars, including Bipasha Basu, provided 45 minutes of live entertainment. Jennifer Lopez and electropop group LMFAO were invited to perform at the event as well. The event was streamed live on YouTube.

The main event featured a heavyweight fight between Bob Sapp and James Thompson. Both fighters are veterans of Pride Fighting Championships but had never faced each other before. Sapp went into the fight on a five-fight losing streak while Thompson had mixed results in his recent outings. As soon as the fight was started, Thompson headed straight for Sapp and took him down within the first thirty seconds of the bout. After some ground and pound and grappling which had both fights on top of the other at some point, Thompson was able to twist Sapp's leg. Sapp tapped out at 1:52 of the first round due to the resulting leg injury.

Results

Card
Weight class				Method	Round	Time	Notes
Middleweight	Xavier Foupa-Pokam	def.	Joey Guel	TKO (doctor stoppage)	1	5:00
Heavyweight	Jimmy Ambriz	def.	Satish Jha	TKO (punches)	1	0:14
Lightweight	Lakhwinder Sekhon	def.	Madura Rathnayke	TKO (punches)	1	1:29
Welterweight	Mohammed Shahid	def.	Mayura Dissanayake	Decision (majority)	3	5:00
Featherweight	Chaitanya Gavali	def.	Tiran Thakshala	Decision (unanimous)	3	5:00
Light Heavyweight	Travis Bell	def.	Neil Natasadu	Submission (forearm choke)	2	1:18
Flyweight	Sanja Sucevic	def.	Lena Ovchynnikova	Submission (rear-naked choke)	2	2:28
Heavyweight	James Thompson	def.	Bob Sapp	TKO (leg injury)	1	1:52

=== Super Fight League 2 ===
Super Fight League 2 took place on April 7, 2012 at the T-Box Mobile Arena in Chandigarh, India. As with Super Fight League 1 it was streamed live on YouTube.

A lightweight bout between Paul Kelly and Gabe Ruediger was initially scheduled. It would have fulfilled a pairing that had been planned for UFC 123. At the time, Ruediger was injured and was replaced by TJ O'Brien. Kelly defeated O'Brien but was released from the UFC after a subsequent loss to Donald Cerrone. Following a knockout loss to Scott Catlin on March 16, 2012, the California State Athletic Commission (CSAC) medically suspended Ruediger. Although Super Fight League wasn't required to follow the CSAC's suspensions, they still decided to remove Ruediger from the fight card. He was replaced with Ryan Healy.

The main event saw Todd Duffee facing Neil Grove. Duffee's last fight was almost a year and a half prior when he lost a match to Alistair Overeem for the vacant Dream Heavyweight Championship. Grove's most recent bouts were with Bellator Fighting Championships where he won three fights and lost three fights. This was the first time the two fighters faced each other. The fight ended 34 seconds into the first round when Duffee earned a technical knockout victory over Neil Grove.

Results

Card
Weight class				Method	Round	Time	Notes
Lightweight	Ryan Healy	def.	Paul Kelly	Decision (unanimous)	3	5:00
Featherweight	Pierre Daguzan	def.	Chaitanya Gavali	Decision (unanimous)	3	5:00
Featherweight	Bharat Khandare	def.	Soro Ismael	Submission (punches)	1	2:16
Middleweight	Alexander Shlemenko	def.	Ikuhisa Minowa	TKO (knee and punch to the body)	1	2:20
Bantamweight	Anup Kumar	def.	Dilanga Rathnaveera	Submission (rear-naked choke)	2	1:45
Lightweight	Ricky Ranjeet Singh	def.	Salika Senanayake	TKO (punches)	1	4:36
130 lbs Catchweight	Colleen Schneider	def.	Cherie Buck	TKO (punches and elbows)	2	2:29
Heavyweight	Todd Duffee	def.	Neil Grove	TKO (punches)	1	0:34

=== Super Fight League 3 ===
Super Fight League 3 took place on May 6, 2012 at the Indira Gandhi Indoor Stadium in New Delhi, India. As with the previous events, it was streamed live on YouTube.

The main event was a heavyweight bout between Bobby Lashley and James Thompson. Lashley was coming into his Super Fight League debut on a two-fight winning streak, which included recently winning the Shark Fights Heavyweight title, whilst Thompson has gone 3-0(1) in his last 4 fights, which included his submission victory against Bob Sapp at Super Fight League 1.

The first round started off with Lashley using his wrestling skills to pressure Thompson. After a couple of knees in the clinch, Thompson accidentally caught Lashley in the groin, in which Lashley took a few minutes to recover from. The round ended with Lashley landing a barrage of punches to Thompson by the side of the cage. The second had both men landing some big punches next to the cage. Bobby shook his opponent a few times with clean strikes, but it was Thompson who won the round by clinching Lashley onto the cage and doing some dirty boxing. Lashley took another accidental low blow in the third, this time, Thompson was given a warning. Once recovered, Lashley came forward and both men continued to strike again. Thompson again kept the fight on the side of the cage with him landing punches from the clinch which arguably gave him the decision victory.

Fight Card

Card
Weight class				Method	Round	Time	Notes
Middleweight	Zelg Galešić	def.	Doug Marshall	KO (flying lnee)	1	0:34
Bantamweight	Gurdarshan Mangat	def.	Liu Si Siong	Submission (rear-naked choke)	2	2:37	(Note: Mangat was docked 2 points in round one for an illegal knee.)
Lightweight	Lakhwinder Sekhon	def.	Vladimir Biandov	TKO (retirement)	2	5:00	(Note: Biandov was not able to continue for the final round after the second.)
Light Heavyweight	Trevor Prangley	def.	Baga Agaev	KO (punches)	3	2:03
176 lbs Catchweight	Kultar Gill	def.	Quinton Arendse	KO (punches)	1	0:51
Bantamweight	Anup Kumar	def.	Chatmongkhon Simma	TKO (punches)	1	4:55	(Note: Kumar was docked 2 points in round one for illegal punches to back of head.)
Flyweight	Joanne Calderwood	def.	Lena Ovchynnikova	Decision (unanimous)	3	5:00	(Note: 30-26, 30-26, 30-26 Ovchynnikova was docked 1 point in round two for fence grabbing.)
Heavyweight	James Thompson	def.	Bobby Lashley	Decision (unanimous)	3	5:00

=== Super Fight League 4 ===
Super Fight League 4 took place on October 12, 2012 in Mumbai, India. As with the previous events, it streamed live on YouTube and Neo Prime in India as well as being shown on the Fight Network in Canada for the first time. This event was originally meant to take place on September 29 at Bangalore and to be headlined by Todd Duffee and Jeff Monson, but due to changes to the structure of the Super Fight League events this fight will not take place at this event. This marked the first event that the Super Fight League began showing weekly events.

Results

Card
Weight class				Method	Round	Time	Notes
Bantamweight	Irfan Khan	def.	Kaushik Sen	Decision (unanimous)	3	5:00
Middleweight	Pawan Maan Singh	def.	Srikant Sekhar	KO (punch)	2	0:46
Welterweight	Bhabajeet Choudhary	def.	Charanjeet Singh	KO (spinning back kick)	2	2:48
Welterweight	Shyam Prasad	def.	Gaurav Singh	Submission (rear-naked choke)	2	0:41
Bantamweight	Manoj Chuhan	def.	Biswa Dev	TKO (slam and punches)	1	0:41
Flyweight	Sanja Sucevic	def.	Irene Cabello	TKO (punches)	2	1:24
Welterweight	Kultar Gill	def.	Amr Wahman	TKO (punches)	1	4:39

=== Super Fight League 5 ===
Super Fight League 5 took place on October 19, 2012 in Mumbai, India. As with the previous events, it streamed live on YouTube and was shown on Neo Prime in India and on the Fight Network in Canada.

Results

Card
Weight class				Method	Round	Time	Notes
Featherweight	Soro Ismael	def.	Siddesh Shirgaonkar	Decision (unanimous)	3	5:00
Featherweight	Ranjith K	def.	Debajit Roy	Submission (guillotine choke)	1	2:47
Bantamweight	Rajesh Sallan	def.	Sarabjit Singh	Submission (rear-naked choke)	1	4:45
Flyweight	Manjit Kolekar	def.	Ritika Singh	TKO (punches)	2	3:45
Lightweight	Rajinder Singh Meena	def.	Amitesh Chaubey	Submission (guillotine choke)	1	1:02
Lightweight	Sandeep Yadav	def.	Amit Kumar	Submission (guillotine choke)	2	4:29
Featherweight	Lakhwinder Sekhon	def.	Mohamed Abdel Hamid	Submission (rear-naked choke)	1	1:11

=== Super Fight League 6 ===
Super Fight League 6 took place on October 26, 2012 in Mumbai, India. As with the previous events, it streamed live on YouTube and was shown on Neo Prime in India and on the Fight Network in Canada.

Results

Card
Weight class				Method	Round	Time	Notes
Light Heavyweight	Mohit Tokas	def.	Love Chauhan	TKO (punches)	1	2:25
Featherweight	Suresh Chavan	def.	Motirul Rahaman	Submission (shoulder choke)	1	0:42
Bantamweight	Kapil Kumar	def.	Sharath Babu	TKO (punches)	2	2:52
Bantamweight	Gurvinder Singh	def.	Subrata Das	Submission (neck crank)	1	2:36
Light Heavyweight	Abhijeet Petkar	def.	Harish Solanki	TKO (punches)	1	1:42
Flyweight	Colleen Schneider	def.	Aya Saeid Saber	TKO (elbows)	1	3:55
Welterweight	Cláudio Silva	def.	Xavier Foupa-Pokam	Decision (unanimous)	3	5:00

=== Super Fight League 7 ===
Super Fight League 7 took place on November 2, 2012 in Mumbai, India. As with the previous events, it streamed live on YouTube and was shown on Neo Prime in India and on the Fight Network in Canada.

Results

Card
Weight class				Method	Round	Time	Notes
Bantamweight	Sarabjit Singh	def.	Atif Khadim	Decision (unanimous)	3	5:00
Featherweight	Narender Grewal	def.	Siddharth Varma	Submission (rear-naked choke)	2	1:06
Lightweight	Hamza Kooheji	def.	Swapnil Barve	Submission (guillotine choke)	2	0:26
Featherweight	Puja Kadian	def.	Walaa Abas	TKO (punches)	2	3:07
Bantamweight	Anup Kumar	def.	Varinder Singh	Submission (rear-naked choke)	1	1:41
Heavyweight	Daniel Amar Singh	def.	Michael Pereira	Submission (guillotine choke)	1	0:23
Welterweight	Michael Page	def.	Haitham El-Sayed	TKO (doctor stoppage)	1	2:15	(Note: Doctor stopped the fight due to cuts on Tantawy)

=== Super Fight League 8 ===
Super Fight League 8 took place on November 9, 2012 in Mumbai, India. As with the previous events, it streamed live on YouTube and was shown on Neo Prime in India and on the Fight Network in Canada.

Results

Card
Weight class				Method	Round	Time	Notes
Lightweight	Sandeep Yadav	def.	Palwinder Singh	Submission (rear-naked choke)	1	0:42
Bantamweight	Manoj Chuhan	def.	Alam Idrisi	TKO (punches)	1	3:58
Featherweight	Bharat Kandare	def.	Pushpender Singh	Submission (rear-naked choke)	1	1:20
Lightweight	Sachin Bhat	def.	Nikhil Bhat	Submission (rear-naked choke)	1	0:37
Featherweight	Tracy Lockwood	def.	Deepika	Submission (rear-naked choke)	1	2:10
Bantamweight	Tom McKenna	def.	Hardeep Singh	Submission (D'arce choke)	1	4:48
Middleweight	John Troyer	def.	Vasily Novikov	Decision (unanimous)	3	5:00

=== Super Fight League 9 ===
Super Fight League 9 took place on November 16, 2012 in Mumbai, India. As with the previous events, it streamed live on YouTube and was shown on Neo Prime in India and on the Fight Network in Canada.

Results

Card
Weight class				Method	Round	Time	Notes
Bantamweight	Santosh Kumar	def.	Sachin Mahanta	Submission (guillotine choke)	1	3:41
Welterweight	Shyam Prasad	def.	Rouhollah Eidehlouei	Submission (guillotine choke)	1	1:08
Flyweight	Monika	def.	Gurleen Kaur	Decision (unanimous)	3	5:00
Middleweight	Satendar Bankura	def.	Rajbir Singh	KO (punch)	1	0:21
Welterweight	Bhabajeet Chowdhury	def.	Jamshed Khan	TKO (lnee and punches)	1	4:34
Bantamweight	Ifran Khan	def.	Kapil Kumar	Submission (guillotine choke)	2	1:26
Welterweight	Amr Wahman	def.	Baz Muhammed	KO (punches)	1	4:55

=== Super Fight League 10 ===
Super Fight League 10 took place on November 23, 2012 in Mumbai, India. As with the previous events, it streamed live on YouTube and was shown on Neo Prime in India and on the Fight Network in Canada.

Results

Card
Weight class				Method	Round	Time	Notes
Bantamweight	Jagdish Kumar	def.	Shaikh Mohammed Farhan	TKO (retirement)	1	2:38
Middleweight	Javed Ali Khan	def.	Srikant Sekhar	TKO (doctor stoppage)	2	5:00
Heavyweight	Nikola Janjic	def.	Vikas Singh Ruhil	Submission (rear-naked choke)	1	2:09
Welterweight	Jason Solomon	def.	Suresh Rajput	KO (knee)	1	1:21
Light Heavyweight	Abhijeet Petkar	def.	Sanjay Jha	TKO (retirement)	1	5:00
Featherweight	Charmaine Tweet	def.	Puja Kadian	Submission (guillotine choke)	1	0:45
Heavyweight	Jimmy Ambriz	def.	Mohamed Abdel Karim	Submission (arm triangle choke)	1	2:38

=== Super Fight League 11 ===
Super Fight League 11 took place on November 30, 2012 in Mumbai, India. As with the previous events, it streamed live on YouTube and was shown on Neo Prime in India and on the Fight Network in Canada.

Results

Card
Weight class				Method	Round	Time	Notes
Lightweight	Rajinder Singh Meena	def.	Amit Raj Kumar	Submission (guillotine choke)	1	1:21
Bantamweight	Irfan Khan	def.	Subrata Das	TKO (punches)	1	1:26
Featherweight	Farbod Irannejad	def.	Ranjith Kvia	Submission (rear-naked choke)	1	2:19
Featherweight	Narender Grewal	def.	Soro Ismael	TKO (punches)	1	2:53
Heavyweight	Virender Singh	def.	Naveen Rao	TKO (punches)	1	2:14
Flyweight	Ritika Singh	def.	Aya Saeid Saber	Decision (unanimous)	3	5:00
Lightweight	Sachin Bhatt	def.	Sandeep Yadav	Submission (rear-naked choke)	2	2:16

=== Super Fight League 12 ===
Super Fight League 12 took place on December 7, 2012 in Mumbai, India. As with the previous events, it will stream live on YouTube and will be shown on Neo Prime in India and on the Fight Network in Canada.

Results

Card
Weight class				Method	Round	Time	Notes
Bantamweight	Sharath Babu	def.	Varinder Singh	TKO (punches)	1	3:56
Featherweight	Abdul Muneer	def.	Amit Pal	Submission (rear-naked choke)	1	2:55
Bantamweight	Uchit Sharma	def.	Yashvir Singh	Submission (guillotine choke)	1	4:23
Light Heavyweight	Arif Khan	def.	Mohit Tokas	Submission (rear-naked choke)	1	1:56
Middleweight	Ravindra Balhara	def.	Pawan Maan Singh	Technical Decision (unanimous)	3	2:04
Flyweight	Julia Berezikova	def.	Karla Benitez	Submission (armbar)	2	1:42
Featherweight	Kario Isaac Maheo	def.	Mahmoud Ashour	Submission (rear-naked choke)	3	4:27

=== Super Fight League 13 ===
Super Fight League 13: Night of Champions took place on December 14, 2012 in Mumbai, India. As with the previous events, it streamed live on YouTube and was shown on Neo Prime in India and on the Fight Network in Canada. The Super Fight League rewarded 4 titles in the men's Welterweight, Lightweight, Featherweight and Bantamweight divisions at this event.

Results

Card
Weight class				Method	Round	Time	Notes
Welterweight	Jamshed Khan	def.	Rouhollah Eidehlouei	TKO (retirement)	2	5:00
Flyweight	Manjit Kolekar	def.	Monika	Submission (rear-naked choke)	1	1:27
Welterweight	Warren De Reuck	def.	Mohamed Hassan Badawy	Submission (triangle choke)	1	4:24
Lightweight	Rajinder Singh Meena	def.	Sandeep Yadav	Submission (guillotine choke)	4	3:40	(Note: For the 1st Super Fight League World Lightweight Championship)
Featherweight	Bharat Kandare	def.	Narender Grewal	Submission (guillotine choke)	1	1:31	(Note: For the 1st Super Fight League World Featherweight Championship)
Bantamweight	Anup Kumar	def.	Manoj Chuhan	Submission (rear-naked choke)	2	2:08	(Note: For the 1st Super Fight League World Bantamweight Championship)
Welterweight	Shyam Prasad	def.	Bhabajeet Choudhury	Submission (rear-naked choke)	2	2:04	(Note: For the 1st Super Fight League World Welterweight Championship)

== See also ==
- Super Fight League
- 2012 in mixed martial arts events
