= Vallabha (name) =

The name Vallabha means lover or beloved in Sanskrit. It is a name of Vishnu. It is sometimes spelled as Vallabh or Vallava. Notable people with this name include:

- Vallabha (philosopher), an ancient Indian philosopher and acharya
- Vallabharaja, a king of Gujarat
- Lakshmi Vallabha, a name for Vishnu
- Vallabha Devi, Thai princess
