= Michael Page =

British mixed martial artist, boxer, and kickboxer (born 1987)

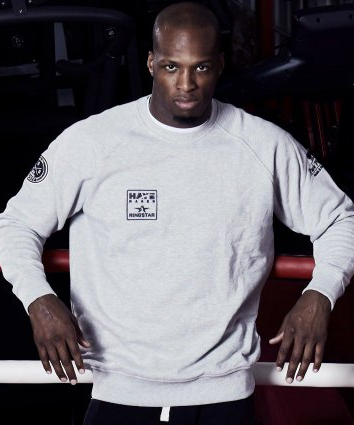
- Page in 2017
- Born: Michael Jerome Reece-Page; 7 April 1987 (age 39); Westminster, London, England
- Nickname: Venom
- Height: 6 ft 3 in (191 cm)
- Weight: 185 lb (84 kg; 13.2 st)
- Division: Welterweight (2012–present) (MMA); Middleweight (2013, 2025–present) (MMA); Light heavyweight (boxing)
- Reach: 79 in (201 cm)
- Style: Kickboxing
- Fighting out of: London, England
- Team: London Shootfighters
- Rank: Black belt in Kung Fu
- Years active: 2017–present (boxing); 2012–present (MMA)

Professional boxing record
- Total: 2
- Wins: 2
- By knockout: 2

Kickboxing record
- Total: 1
- Wins: 1
- By knockout: 1

Mixed martial arts record
- Total: 29
- Wins: 26
- By knockout: 13
- By submission: 3
- By decision: 10
- Losses: 3
- By knockout: 1
- By decision: 2

Other information
- Notable school: Quintin Kynaston School
- Website: michaelvenompage.com
- Boxing record from BoxRec
- Mixed martial arts record from Sherdog

Michael Jerome Reece-Page (born 7 April 1987), known as Michael "Venom" Page or MVP, is a British professional mixed martial artist who most recently competed in the Welterweight and Middleweight divisions of the Ultimate Fighting Championship (UFC). He has also competed professionally as a kickboxer, boxer and bare-knuckle boxer.

Page is recognised in the MMA community for his unorthodox fighting style, which originated from freestyle kickboxing (points fighting) and sport karate.

== Early life ==
Page was born in St Mary's Hospital, London to Curtis Page Sr. and Pauline Reece, who were both Lau Gar kung fu practitioners. His father, a British Telecom employee, hailed from Trinidad while his mother, a nurse, was from Jamaica. Page is a maternal nephew of Lau Gar Master Stan Brown, who was also the instructor of his father. He has nine siblings, three of whom are adopted. Page attended Quintin Kynaston School in St John's Wood, alongside Olympian judoka Ashley McKenzie. He grew up in NW8 near Edgware Road and Lisson Green before moving to W10 near Queen's Park in 2003. Since almost everyone in his family was involved in martial arts, he felt it was natural to follow suit.

Growing up, Page was inspired by martial arts films, particularly those of Jackie Chan, Jet Li, Jean-Claude Van Damme, Bruce Lee, and Sammo Hung.

== Kickboxing career ==
His father, Curtis Page Sr. was his instructor. Of his nine siblings, his sister Sefena and brothers Curtis Jr., Jamie, and Kalon are also kickboxing champions.

Page began training in Lau Gar at the age of three and competed at his first kickboxing tournament at the age of five. By the age of eight, he began to devote himself to competition and entered his first international tournament in Germany.

Page won ten world championships in kickboxing – his first was at the US Open ISKA World Martial Arts Championships 1998 in Orlando, Florida when he was 12 years old – and was crowned British champion over 25 times. By the age of 13, Page started entering adult competitions. To prepare, he would train five hours a day for five days a week. During tournament days he would often fight up to 14 times due to competing in three weight classes, and at one point fought 22 times in a day across five weight classes. Another world title win was at the W.A.K.O. World Championships 2007 (Coimbra) where, at the −89 kg semi-contact division, he won gold after defeating Dave Heffernan. He also competed at the W.A.K.O. Austrian Classics Worldcup 2008 (Kufstein), winning gold in the −84 kg semi-contact division over Krisztián Jároszkievicz. Page participated at the W.A.K.O. Irish Open 2008 (Dublin), earning silver in the −84 kg semi-contact division after falling short to Raymond Daniels. Page then won gold at the W.A.K.O. Austrian Classics Worldcup 2009 (Walchsee), placing first in both the −84 kg light-contact and semi-contact divisions, defeating Bojan Miskovic and Zvonimir Gribl, respectively. Page returned to participate in the W.A.K.O. Irish Open 2009 (Dublin) but was defeated by Raymond Daniels, placing second in the −84 kg semi-contact division. Page – appointed as the WKA Head Coach – led a team to the WKA World Championships 2009 (Huelva), defeating James Benjamin Stewart to claim gold in the organisation's first semi-contact prize competition and bronze in the −90 kg light-contact division, upon being bested by Tarek Haydar. He then participated in the W.A.K.O. World Championships 2009 (Lignano Sabbiadoro) and finished second in the −84 kg semi-contact division, after being defeated by Krisztián Jároszkievicz. On 4 September 2010, he competed at the World Combat Games 2010 (Beijing) in the −84 kg semi-contact division, where he earned silver, losing gold to Krisztián Jároszkievicz. Page fought Raymond Daniels at the W.A.K.O. Irish Open 2011 (Dublin), securing silver in the −84 kg semi-contact division.

Page was scouted by the Great Britain Taekwondo team to train and qualify for the Olympics but turned it down to pursue a professional combat sports career winning a professional kickboxing fight and continuing his journey in mixed martial arts.

When not competing Page trains others in kickboxing, primarily as an instructor at the Hands Down Martial Arts Academies throughout Surrey.

== Mixed martial arts career ==
=== Background ===
Dissatisfied with the lack of exposure as well as the politics involved in competing among various kickboxing associations, Page decided to cross over into mixed martial arts. He initially considered going to American Top Team during his transition into MMA since his older siblings live in Miami but chose to start his career with London Shootfighters in July 2011. Page spends up to seven hours training in the gym, and does not undergo IV therapy after cutting weight. He cross-trains Brazilian jiu-jitsu at Gracie Barra. Page is represented by Paradigm Sports Management.

=== UCMMA ===
Page made his MMA debut at UCMMA 26 against Ben Dishman on 4 February 2012 and won via technical knockout from a first round tornado kick. His original opponent Sam Boo withdrew a day before the fight. The fight went viral and comparisons were drawn between Page and Anderson Silva. He was paid £200 for the bout.

On 7 April 2012, Page faced Miguel Bernard at UCMMA 27 in a 176 lb catchweight bout despite weighing in at 165 lb. Page won in the first round after forcing Bernard to tap out upon transitioning from a triangle choke into an armbar.

Page briefly returned to kickboxing when he fought in a UK-1 bout on 18 August 2012 at UCMMA 29. Page was supposed to challenge UCMMA UK-1 welterweight champion Peter Irving for the belt. However, Irving pulled out of the fight due to a neck injury and was replaced by Jefferson George after another three opponents dropped out within a month for undisclosed reasons. Page won after knocking out George from a two punch combination in the second round.

=== Super Fight League ===
On 24 June 2012, Super Fight League announced that they signed Michael Page to an exclusive 18-month, four-fight contract.

Page made his promotional debut on 2 November 2012 at SFL 7 as the main event against Haitham El-Sayed, winning by technical knockout in round one via doctor stoppage due to cuts.

Page returned to Super Fight League on 12 April 2013 to face Ramdan Mohamed at SFL 15 as the main event and won via rear-naked choke in the first round.

=== Bellator MMA ===
==== 2013 ====
After winning his UK-1 fight against Jefferson George, Page announced that he had signed a five-fight contract with Bellator MMA and that he would fight for Bellator and Super Fight League under their respective contracts.

Page was expected to make his promotional debut at Bellator 82 but pulled out of the bout citing surgery for an old injury. Another potential yet unannounced debut at Bellator 90 against Sean Powers was cancelled for undisclosed reasons.

Page made his debut on 21 March 2013 at Bellator 93. He faced Ryan Sanders and won via knockout at 10 seconds into the first round.

Page was scheduled to fight Kenny Ento at Bellator 102 but withdrew due to a rib cartilage injury, an ankle injury, and a knee injury. A later appearance slated for Bellator 109 against Andrew Osborne was also cancelled because of lingering injuries.

==== 2014 ====
Page was slated to fight Fight Master: Bellator MMA contestant Marcus Aurelio at Bellator 120 on 17 May 2014 but Aurelio withdrew due to injury. Ricky Rainey was immediately sought as a replacement after his Bellator 116 victory and was informed of his opponent a week later. Page won via technical knockout in the first round.

Page next faced Nah-Shon Burrell at Bellator 128 as the co-main event on 10 October 2014. He won via unanimous decision.

On 19 December 2014, Michael Page confirmed that he was no longer contracted with Super Fight League and instead signed an exclusive two year, five-fight contract extension with Bellator.

==== 2015 ====
Page was expected to face Curtis Millender at Bellator 134. However, Page pulled out of the fight due to a cut over his left eye which was sustained during a guard passing drill and required six stitches. He was replaced by Brennan Ward.

Page faced Rudy Bears at Bellator 140 on 17 July 2015. He won by knockout in the first round.

Page fought Charlie Ontiveros at Bellator 144 on 23 October 2015 with less than three weeks' notice after four opponents – including his initial opponent Marius Žaromskis and later Cristiano Souza – pulled out of the fight for undisclosed reasons. Page won via verbal submission due to elbows in the first round after dislocating Ontiveros' jaw.

==== 2016 ====
He was expected to fight Fernando Gonzalez at Bellator 151 as the co-main event but withdrew from the bout as he was already committed to officiate at the W.A.K.O. Irish Open 2016 (Dublin) as coach of the Top Ten UK team. He was replaced by Gilbert Smith.

Page defeated Jeremie Holloway at Bellator 153 on 22 April 2016, submitting him with an Estima lock in round one.

Page's fight with Fernando Gonzalez was rescheduled for Bellator 158 on 16 July 2016 but visa issues forced Gonzalez to withdraw. Page accepted a contract to fight Paul Daley after Josh Koscheck withdrew but Daley chose to fight Douglas Lima instead. Page fought Evangelista Santos and won by knocking out Santos with a flying knee in the second round. Santos underwent surgery afterwards due to a depressed frontal sinus fracture. The fight went viral partly due to the Pokémon Go-inspired post-fight celebration.

In July 2016, Bellator claimed that Page re-signed with the promotion and had four fights left on his contract. However, Page stated that he did not re-sign but had two fights left from existing contractual provisions.

Page fought Fernando Gonzalez on 19 November 2016 at Bellator 165 as the co-main event. He won the fight via split decision.

==== 2017 ====
A proposed bout between Page and Paul Daley was targeted for Bellator 179 but negotiations fell through after Daley chose to fight Rory MacDonald instead. Page was supposed to fight Derek Anderson but an old knee injury and neck injury forced him off the card. Daley attempted to brawl with Page after losing his fight. Another fight with Daley was proposed for September 2017 in London but was turned down by Daley, who instead opted to fight Lorenz Larkin at Bellator 183.

Page was expected to compete at Bellator 191 but a fight was never announced.

==== 2018 ====
Bellator attempted to match Page against Daley on 9 March 2018 but negotiations stalled when Daley refused to commit to the date.

Page fought David Rickels on 25 May 2018 at Bellator 200 as the co-main event. He won the fight via verbal submission due to a punch in the second round that opened a cut above Rickels' left eye. He spent a portion of his training camp at Straight Blast Gym - Ireland in preparation for the fight. He paid tribute to his cousin Helena Ramsay, a victim of the Stoneman Douglas High School shooting, during the open workout and post-fight interview.

On 30 July 2018, Page confirmed signing a new six-fight contract with Bellator, three for the tournament and three as part of the champion clause. The contract will let him box, subject to Bellator's approval.

==== 2019 ====
Page faced Paul Daley in the quarter-final of the Bellator Welterweight World Grand Prix Tournament on 16 February 2019 at Bellator 216. He won by unanimous decision, in an uneventful fight in which neither fighter was able to mount any significant offence. His father died prior to the fight on 26 December 2018.

Page fought former two-time Bellator Welterweight World Champion Douglas Lima in the semi-final of the welterweight tournament on 11 May 2019 at Bellator 221. Despite having some initial success, Page lost the fight via knockout in the second round.

Page faced Richard Kiely at Bellator 227 as the co-main event on 27 September 2019. He won the fight via knockout from a flying knee in the first round.

Page was expected to headline Bellator London 2 against Derek Anderson on 23 November 2019 but Anderson withdrew for undisclosed reasons on 12 November 2019. Page instead fought Giovanni Melillo and won by knockout in the first round.

On 29 December 2019, Page fought Shinsho Anzai at Bellator & Rizin: Japan in a 173 lb catchweight bout. He won by knockout in the second round.

==== 2020 ====
Page faced Ross Houston at Bellator 248 on 10 October 2020. He won the bout via unanimous decision.

==== 2021 ====
Page faced Derek Anderson at Bellator 258 on 7 May 2021. Page was supposed to fight Anderson twice before at Bellator 179 and Bellator London 2. During the first round, Page broke and flattened Anderson's nose with a kick, leading to the doctor stopping the fight between rounds.

Page faced Douglas Lima in a rematch on 1 October 2021 at Bellator 267, Bellator's first card in the UK since the COVID-19 pandemic. He won the bout via split decision.

==== 2022 ====
Page was scheduled to fight for the Bellator Welterweight World Championship against reigning champion Yaroslav Amosov on 13 May 2022 at Bellator 281. However, Amosov pulled out of the bout to fight in the Russo-Ukrainian War and was replaced by Logan Storley with the bout instead being for the interim Bellator Welterweight World Championship. Page lost the bout via split decision.

==== 2023 ====
Page faced Goiti Yamauchi on 10 March 2023 at Bellator 292. He won the fight via TKO less than thirty seconds into the first round.

Page announced his free agency on 17 July 2023.

=== Ultimate Fighting Championship ===
In December 2023, it was announced that Page has signed with the Ultimate Fighting Championship after free agency. Page made his UFC debut against Kevin Holland on 9 March 2024 at UFC 299. He won the bout by unanimous decision.

==== 2024 ====
Page faced Ian Garry on 29 June 2024, at UFC 303. He lost the fight by unanimous decision.

==== 2025 ====
Page faced Sharabutdin Magomedov in a middleweight bout on 1 February 2025 at UFC Fight Night 250. He won the fight by unanimous decision leading to Magomedov's first MMA loss.

Page faced former UFC Middleweight Championship challenger Jared Cannonier on 16 August 2025 at UFC 319. He won the fight via unanimous decision.

==== 2026 ====
Page faced Sam Patterson in a welterweight bout on 21 March 2026 at UFC Fight Night 270. He won the fight by unanimous decision.

In the last fight of his UFC contract, Page faced Nursulton Ruziboev on 5 September 2026, at UFC Fight Night 287. He won the fight by unanimous decision, in which he faced criticism for his performance. On 8 September 2026, UFC President Dana White confirmed that the UFC would not re-sign Page, thus making him a free agent.

=== MF Sports ===
On 10 October 2026, KSI announced that Page had signed a multi-year deal with MF Sports.

== Boxing career ==
On 12 July 2017, it was announced that Page signed a three-year, fifteen-fight contract with Hayemaker Ringstar, a promotional joint venture of David Haye and Richard Schaefer. Page began training under the tutelage of Ismael Salas at Hayemaker HQ on 27 July 2017, alongside Joe Joyce, Qais Ashfaq, and Willy Hutchinson. While he still trains at London Shootfighters, he spends four days a week training at Hayemaker HQ. Page compared the transition from MMA to boxing to a "sprinter turning into a long distance runner." He did commentary for Floyd Mayweather Jr. vs. Conor McGregor in Las Vegas with Mike Costello and Steve Bunce on BBC Radio 5 Live.

Page made his boxing debut on 20 October 2017 at Hayemaker Ringstar Fight Night against Jonathan Castaño as the co-main event. He won via technical knockout in the third round. He was supposed to debut on the undercard of Haye vs. Bellew but was still negotiating with Bellator at the time.

Page wanted to fight at Hayemaker Ringstar Fight Night 2 on 16 February 2018 but Bellator wanted an MMA fight scheduled before allowing him to commit to another boxing fight.

He was expected to fight on the undercard of Haye vs. Bellew II but Bellator prevented him from competing due to its proximity to Bellator 200.

Page fought at Hayemaker Ringstar Fight Night 3 against Michal Ciach on 15 June 2018. He won by knockout in the second round.

== Bare-knuckle boxing ==
In June 2022, it was announced that Page would make his bare-knuckle boxing debut for Bare Knuckle Fighting Championship. He fought Ultimate Fighting Championship veteran Mike Perry on 20 August 2022 in the main event at BKFC 27. Page lost by majority decision after the sixth round after the bout was declared a split draw decision following the first five rounds.

== Professional grappling career ==
Page faced Carlos Condit in the main event of Polaris 30 on November 2, 2024. He won the match by decision.

== Freestyle wrestling ==
Page was scheduled to face Alexander Shlemenko on October 23, 2026 at RAF 14. However, Page withdrew due to timing issues and was replaced by Brendan Allen.

== Fighting style ==
Page describes his discipline as a "hands down kickboxing style" created from a "mishmash" of taekwondo, karate, and kung fu styles competing under a points scoring ruleset. As a low-volume movement-based fighter, his game plan revolves around controlling distance and landing heavy counterstrikes with high accuracy. He relies on his elusive movement and knockout power to finish opponents and often engages in histrionics while fighting to maintain focus, unnerve his opponents, and rile up the crowd. Page credited his parents, as well as Simon Lewis, and Marvin Francis as being the most influential in his combat sports career.

== Personal life ==
Page received the moniker "Venom" from fellow kickboxer Marvin Francis in homage of the film Five Deadly Venoms.

Page is an active supporter of Manchester United F.C. He became a pollo-pescetarian in August 2017.

In 2024, he converted to Islam.

== Championships and accomplishments ==
=== Kickboxing ===
- World Combat Games
  - 2010 World Combat Games Silver Medalist (Semi-Contact)
- World Association of Kickboxing Organizations
  - 2011 W.A.K.O. Irish Open Silver Medalist (Semi-Contact)
  - 2009 W.A.K.O. World Championships Silver Medalist (Semi-Contact)
  - 2009 W.A.K.O. Irish Open Silver Medalist (Semi-Contact)
  - 2009 W.A.K.O. Austrian Classics Worldcup Gold Medalist (Light Contact)
  - 2009 W.A.K.O. Austrian Classics Worldcup Gold Medalist (Semi-Contact)
  - 2008 W.A.K.O. Irish Open Silver Medalist (Semi-Contact)
  - 2008 W.A.K.O. Austrian Classics Worldcup Gold Medalist (Semi-Contact)
  - 2007 W.A.K.O. World Championships Gold Medalist (Semi-Contact)
- World Kickboxing Association
  - 2009 WKA World Championships Bronze Medalist (Light Contact)
  - 2009 WKA World Championships Gold Medalist (Semi-Contact)
- International Sport Karate Association
  - 1998 US Open ISKA World Martial Arts Championships Gold Medalist (Semi-Contact)

=== Mixed martial arts ===
- Ultimate Fighting Championship
  - UFC.com Awards
    - 2024: Ranked #10 Newcomer of the Year
- Bellator MMA
  - Bellator Welterweight Grand Prix Semifinalist
  - Most stoppage victories in Bellator Welterweight division history (10)
  - Most knockout victories in Bellator Welterweight division history (9)
  - Tied (Patricky Pitbull) for most knockout victories in Bellator history (11)
  - Fourth most wins in Bellator history (17)
  - Tied (Douglas Lima) for second most wins in Bellator Welterweigh division history (14)
- World MMA Awards
  - 2016 Knockout of the Year vs. Evangelista Santos at Bellator 158
- MMA Junkie
  - 2016 July Knockout of the Month vs. Evangelista Santos
  - 2016 Knockout of the Year vs. Evangelista Santos
  - 2023 March Knockout of the Month vs. Goiti Yamauchi
- Sherdog
  - Sherdog's Top 10: Greatest Single Strikes in MMA History (No. 4) vs. Evangelista Santos
  - Sherdog's Top 10: Bellator MMA Knockouts (No. 2) vs. Evangelista Santos
  - 2016 Knockout of the Year vs. Evangelista Santos
- theScore
  - MMA's most devastating knockouts of 2016 (No. 1) vs. Evangelista Santos
- Bleacher Report
  - 2016 Knockout of the Year vs. Evangelista Santos

== Mixed martial arts record ==
Professional record breakdown
29 matches	26 wins	3 losses
By knockout	13	1
By submission	3	0
By decision	10	2

Res.	Record	Opponent	Method	Event	Date	Round	Time	Location	Notes
Win	26–3	Nursulton Ruziboev	Decision (unanimous)	UFC Fight Night: Hooker vs. Parnasse	5 September 2026	3	5:00	Paris, France	
Win	25–3	Sam Patterson	Decision (unanimous)	UFC Fight Night: Evloev vs. Murphy	21 March 2026	3	5:00	London, England	Welterweight bout.
Win	24–3	Jared Cannonier	Decision (unanimous)	UFC 319	16 August 2025	3	5:00	Chicago, Illinois, United States	
Win	23–3	Sharabutdin Magomedov	Decision (unanimous)	UFC Fight Night: Adesanya vs. Imavov	1 February 2025	3	5:00	Riyadh, Saudi Arabia	Return to Middleweight.
Loss	22–3	Ian Machado Garry	Decision (unanimous)	UFC 303	29 June 2024	3	5:00	Las Vegas, Nevada, United States	
Win	22–2	Kevin Holland	Decision (unanimous)	UFC 299	9 March 2024	3	5:00	Miami, Florida, United States	
Win	21–2	Goiti Yamauchi	TKO (leg kick)	Bellator 292	10 March 2023	1	0:26	San Jose, California, United States	
Loss	20–2	Logan Storley	Decision (split)	Bellator 281	13 May 2022	5	5:00	London, England	For the interim Bellator Welterweight World Championship.
Win	20–1	Douglas Lima	Decision (split)	Bellator 267	1 October 2021	3	5:00	London, England	
Win	19–1	Derek Anderson	TKO (doctor stoppage)	Bellator 258	7 May 2021	1	5:00	Uncasville, Connecticut, United States	Catchweight (175 lb) bout.
Win	18–1	Ross Houston	Decision (unanimous)	Bellator 248	10 October 2020	3	5:00	Paris, France	Catchweight (175 lb) bout.
Win	17–1	Shinsho Anzai	KO (punch)	Bellator 237	29 December 2019	2	0:23	Saitama, Japan	Catchweight (173 lb) bout.
Win	16–1	Giovanni Melillo	KO (punch)	Bellator London 2	23 November 2019	1	1:47	London, England	
Win	15–1	Richard Kiely	KO (flying knee)	Bellator 227	27 September 2019	1	2:42	Dublin, Ireland	Page was deducted one point in round 1 due to a mocking his opponent.
Loss	14–1	Douglas Lima	KO (punches)	Bellator 221	13 May 2019	2	0:35	Rosemont, Illinois, United States	Bellator Welterweight World Grand Prix Semifinal.
Win	14–0	Paul Daley	Decision (unanimous)	Bellator 216	16 February 2019	5	5:00	Uncasville, Connecticut, United States	Bellator Welterweight World Grand Prix Quarterfinal.
Win	13–0	David Rickels	TKO (retirement)	Bellator 200	25 May 2018	2	0:43	London, England	
Win	12–0	Fernando Gonzalez	Decision (split)	Bellator 165	19 November 2016	3	5:00	San Jose, California, United States	
Win	11–0	Evangelista Santos	KO (flying knee)	Bellator 158	16 July 2016	2	4:31	London, England	
Win	10–0	Jeremie Holloway	Submission (achilles lock)	Bellator 153	22 April 2016	1	2:15	Uncasville, Connecticut, United States	
Win	9–0	Charlie Ontiveros	TKO (elbows)	Bellator 144	23 October 2015	1	3:20	Uncasville, Connecticut, United States	
Win	8–0	Rudy Bears	KO (punch)	Bellator 140	17 July 2015	1	1:05	Uncasville, Connecticut, United States	
Win	7–0	Nah-Shon Burrell	Decision (unanimous)	Bellator 128	10 October 2014	3	5:00	Thackerville, Oklahoma, United States	
Win	6–0	Ricky Rainey	TKO (punch)	Bellator 120	17 May 2014	1	4:29	Southaven, Mississippi, United States	Return to Welterweight.
Win	5–0	Ramdan Mohamed	Submission (rear-naked choke)	Super Fight League 15	12 April 2013	1	3:48	Mumbai, India	Middleweight debut.
Win	4–0	Ryan Sanders	KO (punch)	Bellator 93	21 March 2013	1	0:10	Lewiston, Maine, United States	
Win	3–0	Haitham El-Sayed	TKO (doctor stoppage)	Super Fight League 7	2 November 2012	1	2:15	Mumbai, India	
Win	2–0	Miguel Bernard	Submission (armbar)	Ultimate Challenge MMA 27	7 April 2012	1	1:43	London, England	Catchweight (176 lb) bout; Bernard missed weight.
Win	1–0	Ben Dishman	TKO (tornado kick)	Ultimate Challenge MMA 26	4 February 2012	1	1:05	London, England	Welterweight debut.

== Professional boxing record ==
2 fights	2 wins	0 losses
By knockout	2	0

No.	Result	Record	Opponent	Type	Round, time	Date	Location	Notes
2	Win	2–0	(Poland) Michal Ciach	KO	2 (4), 0:18	15 Jun 2018	(United Kingdom) York Hall, London, England	
1	Win	1–0	(Spain) Jonathan Castaño	TKO	3 (4), 2:15	20 Oct 2017	(United Kingdom) Indigo at The O2, London, England	

== Bare knuckle record ==
Professional record breakdown
1 match	0 wins	1 loss
By decision	0	1

Res.	Record	Opponent	Method	Event	Date	Round	Time	Location	Notes
Loss	0–1	Mike Perry	Decision (majority)	BKFC 27	20 August 2022	6	2:00	London, England	The first five rounds went to a split draw

== Professional kickboxing record ==
Kickboxing record
1 Win (1 KO), 0 Losses
Date	Result	Opponent	Event	Location	Method	Round	Time	Record
2012-08-18	Win	(United Kingdom) Jefferson George	UCMMA 29	London, United Kingdom	KO (punch)	2	2:04	1–0
Cage fight with MMA gloves (K-1 rules).
Legend: Win Loss Draw/No contest Notes

== See also ==
- List of male boxers
- List of male mixed martial artists
