= Colleen Schneider =

American mixed martial arts (MMA) fighter

- Born: March 12, 1982 (age 44); Syracuse, New York, US
- Other names: Super Collider, Thoroughbred, Biscuit, The Beautiful Disaster, Thumper
- Height: 5 ft 9 in (175 cm)
- Weight: 135 lb (61 kg; 9 st 9 lb)
- Division: Bantamweight (135 lb), Flyweight (125 lb)
- Style: Taekwondo, Muay Thai, Catch Wrestling
- Fighting out of: Gardena, CA, US
- Team: California Mixed Martial Arts
- Trainer: Chad George
- Rank: 2nd Degree black belt in Taekwondo
- Years active: 2010–2018 (MMA)

Mixed martial arts record
- Total: 19
- Wins: 11
- By knockout: 4
- By submission: 3
- By decision: 4
- Losses: 8
- By knockout: 1
- By submission: 4
- By decision: 3

Other information
- Mixed martial arts record from Sherdog

Colleen Schneider (born March 12, 1982, in Syracuse, New York) is a retired American professional mixed martial artist. Colleen was a contestant in season 18 of The Ultimate Fighter reality competition television show.

== Early life ==
She attended Cicero-North Syracuse High School in New York, and graduated from the University of California, Berkeley with a bachelor's degree in physics. While at Berkeley, Schneider competed in and taught taekwondo, which led her to discover mixed martial arts.

== Mixed martial arts career ==
=== Strikeforce ===
On August 13, 2010, she made her debut for the Strikeforce promotion at Strikeforce Challengers 10 in a reserve bout for their one-night Women's Welterweight tournament. She lost to future UFC bantamweight Liz Carmouche via unanimous decision after two rounds.

=== Super Fight League ===
After going 1–4 in her first five fights, she signed with the upstart Indian promotion, the Super Fight League at SFL 2 against Cherie Buck in the flyweight division. She won the fight via TKO in the second round.

She then fought Aya Saeid Saber at SFL 6, in which she won after stopping Saber from elbow strikes in the first round.

She then competed against Sanja Sucevic at SFL 14 to crown the first SFL World Women's Flyweight Champion. After using her wrestling to control Sucevic in the first two rounds, Schneider submitted Sanja with a keylock to win her first title.

She later relinquished the title in order to compete to get onto The Ultimate Fighter season 18 reality television show.

=== The Ultimate Fighter ===
In May 2013, Dave Meltzer released a list of rumored participants on the upcoming The Ultimate Fighter: Team Rousey vs. Team Tate and Schneider was on the list. In August 2013, it was confirmed that Schneider was one of the fighters selected to be on The Ultimate Fighter: Team Rousey vs. Team Tate. In the elimination fight to get into the TUF house, Schneider faced Shayna Baszler and lost via an armbar submission in the first round.

=== Invicta FC ===
Schneider made her Invicta Fighting Championships debut on February 27, 2015, against Irene Aldana. She lost the fight via submission in the first round. She returned to Invicta January 16, 2016, with a split decision win over Raquel Pa’aluhi. At Invicta 17 on May 7, 2016, she faced Tonya Evinger for the bantamweight championship but was defeated via unanimous decision.

=== Bellator MMA ===
In November 2016 Schneider signed for Bellator. She made her debut against Chrissie Daniels at Bellator 170 on January 21, 2017. She won the fight via anaconda choke submission in the first round.

Schneider faced Kate Jackson at Bellator 182 on August 25, 2017. She lost the fight due to a catastrophic knee injury at the end of the first round. The injury led to a difficult surgery and rehab, after which Schneider chose to retire from the sport. She is now pursuing a PhD in ecological economics at the Vienna University of Economics and Business.

== Titles ==
- 2014 – FILA Submission Grappling World Championships
- 2014 – SFL Super Fight League World Women’s Bantamweight Champion
- 2013 – SFL Super Fight League World Women’s Flyweight Champion

== Mixed martial arts record ==
Professional record breakdown
19 matches	11 wins	8 losses
By knockout	4	1
By submission	3	4
By decision	4	3

Res.	Record	Opponent	Method	Event	Date	Round	Time	Location	Notes
Loss	11–8	Kate Jackson	TKO (knee injury)	Bellator 182	August 25, 2017	1	5:00	Verona, New York, US	
Win	11–7	Chrissie Daniels	Submission (anaconda choke)	Bellator 170	January 21, 2017	1	1:30	Inglewood, California, US	
Loss	10–7	Tonya Evinger	Decision (unanimous)	Invicta FC 17: Evinger vs. Schneider	May 7, 2016	5	5:00	Costa Mesa, California, US	For the Invicta FC Bantamweight Championship.
Win	10–6	Raquel Pa'aluhi	Decision (split)	Invicta FC 15: Cyborg vs. Ibragimova	January 16, 2016	3	5:00	Costa Mesa, California, US	
Win	9–6	Bryanna Fissori	Decision (split)	Pancrase 270	October 4, 2015	3	5:00	Tokyo, Japan	
Win	8–6	Diana Reyes	TKO (injury)	AMK III	August 22, 2015	3	3:51	Tijuana, Mexico	
Win	7–6	Xiong Jingnan	Decision (unanimous)	Kunlun Fight 26	June 6, 2015	3	5:00	Chongqing, China	
Loss	6–6	Irene Aldana	Submission (rear-naked choke)	Invicta FC 11: Cyborg vs. Tweet	February 27, 2015	1	1:05	Los Angeles, California, US	
Win	6–5	Brenda Gonzales	Decision (unanimous)	SFL 35	October 4, 2014	5	5:00	Tacoma, Washington, US	Won inaugural SFL America Women's bantamweight championship
Loss	5–5	DeAnna Bennett	Submission (rear-naked choke)	Showdown Fights 14- Heavyweight Collision	June 28, 2014	1	3:02	Orem, Utah, US	
Win	5–4	Christina Marks	Submission (armbar)	SCMMA3 - Fight to the End	September 7, 2013	2	3:15	Ontario, California, US	Move to bantamweight
Win	4–4	Sanja Sucevic	Submission (americana)	SFL 14	March 29, 2013	3	2:54	Mumbai, India	Won inaugural SFL flyweight championship
Win	3–4	Aya Saeid Saber	TKO (elbows)	SFL 6	October 26, 2012	1	3:55	Mumbai, India	
Win	2–4	Cherie Buck	TKO (punches and elbows)	SFL 2	April 7, 2012	2	2:29	Chandigarh, India	
Loss	1–4	Vanessa Mariscal	Submission (neck crank)	BEP 4	June 17, 2011	3	1:40	Fletcher, North Carolina, US	
Win	1–3	Amber Mann	TKO (punches)	Gladiator Challenge - Warpath	May 21, 2011	1	0:17	Placerville, California, US	
Loss	0–3	Casey Noland	Decision (unanimous)	UWC - Ultimate Women Challenge	September 24, 2010	3	3:00	St. George, Utah, United States	
Loss	0–2	Liz Carmouche	Decision (unanimous)	Strikeforce Challengers: Riggs vs. Taylor	August 13, 2010	2	3:00	Phoenix, Arizona, US	
Loss	0–1	Sarah D'Alelio	Submission (rear-naked choke)	FE - Arctic Combat 2	March 19, 2010	2	N/A	Fairbanks, Alaska, US	
