= Nimbus Communications =

Former Indian media company

- Founded: 1987
- Founder: Harish Thawani
- Fate: Liquidated
- Headquarters: Mumbai, India
- Services: Entertainment, Sports Marketing & Broadcasting
- Website: www.nimbus.co.in

Nimbus Communications Limited was an Indian media and entertainment company, and sports broadcaster, known for its Neo Prime and Neo Sports channels.

Nimbus offered integrated, end-to-end media services focused on sports broadcasting, marketing, and filmed entertainment. Headquartered in Mumbai, it was established in 1987 by Harish Thawani, and operated across India, Singapore, the Middle East, and the Caribbean, serving customers in the United States, Canada, the UK, Asia, Africa, Australia, New Zealand, and Europe.

In 2006, the company secured a four-year contract with the BCCI for international match broadcasting rights, valued at $612.18 million (Rs 2,714 crore). In 2010, the Times of India Group acquired a minority stake in Nimbus.

In 2017, Nimbus Communications sold a portion of its digital Bangladesh cricket content rights—covering select archival periods and exclusive digital use—to Marhaba Cricket India Ltd, a UK-registered company involved in cricket rights acquisition and distribution.

In 2018, following financial disputes with Union Bank of India regarding unpaid short-term loans totaling ₹35 crore, the Bombay High Court ordered the liquidation of Nimbus Communications.

== Channels ==
=== List of channels ===
- Neo Sports
- NEO Prime
- Neo Cricket (rebranded to Neo Prime)

Neo Sports
- Country: India
- Broadcast area: India

Ownership
- Owner: Nimbus Communications

History
- Launched: 8 November 2006; 19 years ago
- Closed: 12 November 2018; 7 years ago

Links
- Website: www.neosports.tv

NEO Sports was an Indian television channel, owned and operated by Nimbus Communications. Launched on 8 November 2006, it covers virtually all prime events in almost all popular sports like Golf, Football, Basketball, Tennis, Table Tennis, Motor Racing, Horse Racing and Sailing. The channel has Golf as a prime sport along with football.

== Events ==
=== Cricket ===
- International cricket in New Zealand till 2013
- International cricket in Bangladesh till 2013
- International cricket in India till March 2012
- Domestic cricket in India till March 2012
- Asia Cup till 2012

=== Football ===
- A-League
- Eredivisie
- Coppa Italia
- Coupe de France
- FIFA Club World Cup

== See also ==
- NEO Sports Plus
- ATN NEO Cricket
