= Super Fight League =

Indian mixed martial arts promotion

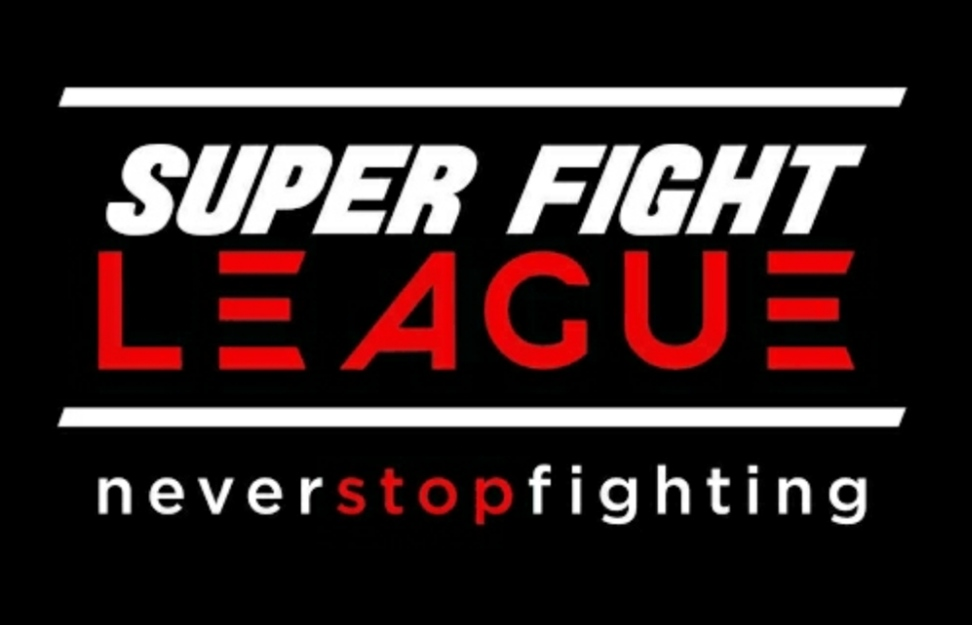
- Type: Private
- Industry: Mixed martial arts promotion
- Founded: 2012; 14 years ago
- Founder: Sanjay Dutt; Raj Kundra
- Defunct: 2018
- Headquarters: India
- Owner: Bill Dosanjh; Amir Khan
- Website: Official website

Super Fight League was a mixed martial arts promotion based in India. The organisation was formed in 2012 by actor Sanjay Dutt and British-Indian businessman Raj Kundra, and co-owned by British-Indian businessman Bill Dosanjh and British boxing champion Amir Khan.

Super Fight League had 67 live televised events, with over 100 million views. It has produced at least 50 live televised events broadcast on Colors, Neo Prime, ESPN Star Sports, MTV India and YouTube.

== History ==
The Super Fight League was formed in 2012 by actor Sanjay Dutt and British Indian businessman Raj Kundra, with the intent of giving Indian mixed martial artists a platform to compete and grow in its home country whilst bringing in talented fighters from different parts of the world. They launched their first event on 11 March 2012, which was headlined by Bob 'The Beast' Sapp and James 'The Colossus' Thompson.

On 27 February, the Super Fight League announced that they had signed Todd Duffee, Trevor Prangley, Baga Agaev, Paul Kelly, Xavier Foupa-Pokam and Lena Ovchynnikova to four fight exclusive contracts.

On 23 June, the Super Fight League announced that they had signed Jeff Monson, Satoshi Ishii, Rameau Thierry Sokoudjou, and Michael Page.

It was announced by the Fight Network that they will show all of the Super Fight League’s events on Canadian TV.

In September 2012 Pavia resigned his position as the CEO of the Super Fight League citing "family reasons."

The Super Fight League made three announcements on 24 September 2012. The first was a strategic alliance between themselves and Invicta Fighting Championships, which aims to bring the best Indian female fighters to Invicta, whilst Invicta will aim to send world class female mixed martial artists to the Super Fight League. The second announcement was the Friday Night Fight Nights. From 12 October, the Super Fight League will hold an event every Friday in a specially designed arena in Mumbai in front of an exclusive invitation only audience. This will replace the original model of holding arena events once aimed one a month. Programming will last for three hours each week with weigh-ins, live fights, and interviews from Bollywood cage side guests. There will be 7 fights in total each event, with 1 of them being a female bout. It will air live on Neo Prime in India and on their YouTube page for the rest of the world.

The final announcement was introducing Indian Olympic Female Boxing Bronze Medallist Mary Kom as the Super Fight League's brand ambassador.

At Super Fight League 13: Night of Champions, the Super Fight League rewarded 5 titles in the men's and women's division.

Launching on 4 December 2012, the Super Fight League announced a strategic partnership Provogue to set up a new company to jointly market all merchandise for Super Fight League. The company has been named Pro Super Fight League and the first product to hit the market is the New Deodorant Range 'Aspire, Inspire and Desire'.

The Super Fight League signed a new TV deal with ESPN Star Sport in India for all events to be shown live, starting with Super Fight League 14 on 29 March 2013.

On 4 October 2014, Super Fight League held its inaugural show in the United States, with Super Fight League 35 taking place in Tacoma, Washington, followed by Clash of Titans in Dubai, a fight night rivalry between two countries, India and Pakistan On 27 February 2015.

British boxer Amir Khan announced his share in the SFL in 2016, and would set up the first team-based MMA league.

== Super Fight League Challengers ==
On 5 August 2012, the Super Fight League aired their reality show Super Fight League Challengers. Similar to the Ultimate Fighter, the show took 8 male and 8 female up-and-coming Indian mixed martial artists, place them in the same house whilst they compete to become the winner of the show. Every alternate episode has 2 fights where 2 fighters (male and female) graduate to the next round whereas the other two have to leave the camp. The show went on for 50 days and the fighter will a be given tasks each week, as well as being trained by some of the best international trainers available. The winner received Rs. 20 lakhs (approx. $30,000 / £22000) and a 3-year contract worth Rs. 25 lakhs with the promotion. The show was aired on Neo Prime and Zoom TV. The inaugural season was won by Kario Isaac Maheo and Manjit Kolekar.

== Teams and owners ==
Teams	Owners
Bengaluru Tigers	Shreeram Suresh, Vinodini Suresh (8K Miles Media), co-owner Tiger Shroff
Haryana Sultans	Kanav Parwal (SPA Capital), co-owner Randeep Hooda
Sher-E-Punjab	Owner Achin Kochar (VI – John)
Mumbai Maniacs	Amit Burman (Dabur), co-owner Ajay Devgn
Gujarat Warriors	Jaskaran Punihani and Navraj Jaura (Jaura Group), co-owner Salim–Sulaiman
U.P. Nawabs	Amit Agarwal (SJ Granulate Solutions), Keshav Bansal (Intex), Nilesh Parmar (3 Capital Limited), co-owner Arbaaz Khan
Tamil Veerans	N/A
Delhi Heroes	Aditya Munjal (Hero Cycles)

== League structure (until 2018) ==
There are two groups, "A" and "B", consisting of four teams. Every team has six members (five male and one female) and six back-ups. These members belong to six different weight categories. The four teams compete in twelve League level matches. Two semi final matches are held, followed by the third place and final match.

=== Scoring system ===
The following are the five scales the contestants are scored on:

1. Draw = 1 point Unanimous/Majority/Split
2. Referee Decision = 3 points Unanimous/Split
3. TKO = 4 points
4. Submission = 5 points
5. KO = 6 points

=== Teams ===
- Sher-e-Punjab
- Goa Pirates
- Delhi Heroes
- Bengaluru Tigers
- Haryana Sultans
- Mumbai Maniacs
- U.P. Nawabs
- Gujarat Warriors

== Rules ==
Super Fight League's current rules are based upon the Unified Rules of Mixed Martial Arts that were originally established by the New Jersey State Athletic Control Board and modified by the Nevada State Athletic Commission.

== Cage ==
Super Fight League uses a structure called the 'O'Zone. The 'O'Zone is a circular cage of chain-link fence that has been coated in black vinyl. The height of the fence varies between 5 feet 6 inches (1.68 m) and 5 feet 8 inches (1.73 m), is 30 feet (9.1 m) in diameter and sits atop a 2.6 feet (0.79 m) platform. There are two gates on opposite sides of the cage to allow for people to enter and leave the cage.

== Final champions ==
=== Men's divisions ===
Division	Champion	Since	Defenses
Heavyweight	(United States) Richard Foster	April 23, 2022	0
Light Heavyweight	(United States) Jay Radick	August 10, 2019	0
Middleweight	(United States) Luis Iniguez	Apr 23, 2022	0
Welterweight	(India) Hari Prasad	Sept 26, 2015	0
Welterweight (American Division)	(United States) Luis Iniguez	July 24, 2021	0
Lightweight	(India) Pawan Maan Singh	Aug 17, 2013	0
Lightweight (American Division)	(United States) Tristan Connelly	April 28, 2018	1
Featherweight (American Division)	(United States) Kevin Boehm	Aug. 10, 2019	0
Bantamweight	(United States) Tom McKenna	May 10, 2013	0
Bantamweight (American Division)	(United States) Chris San Jose	May 5, 2018	2
Flyweight	Vacant		

=== Women's divisions ===
Division	Champion	Since	Defenses
Featherweight	Vacant		0
Bantamweight	Vacant		0
Bantamweight (American Division)	Vacant		0
Flyweight	Vacant		0
Strawweight	Vacant		0

- List of Champions

== Past events ==
- 2012 in Super Fight League
- 2013 in SFL numbered events
- 2014–2016 in SFL numbered events
