= Bellator 281 =

Bellator mixed martial arts event in 2022

Bellator 281: MVP vs. Storley
- The poster for Bellator 281: MVP vs. Storley
- Promotion: Bellator MMA
- Date: May 13, 2022
- Venue: SSE Arena
- City: London, England

Event chronology
Bellator 280: Bader vs. Kongo	Bellator 281: MVP vs. Storley	Bellator 282: Mousasi vs. Eblen

Bellator 281: MVP vs. Storley (also known as Bellator London) was a mixed martial arts event produced by Bellator MMA that took place on May 13, 2022, at SSE Arena in London, England.

== Background ==
The event marked the promotion's seventh visit to London and first since Bellator 267 in October 2021.

A Bellator Welterweight World Championship bout between current champion Yaroslav Amosov and Michael Page was expected to headline the event. However, Due to the Russian invasion of Ukraine and Amosov's participation in the war on the side of Ukraine, Amosov pulled out of the bout and was replaced by Logan Storley with the bout now being for the interim title.

A welterweight bout between Douglas Lima and Jason Jackson was scheduled for this event. However, due to shoulder injury to Lima, the bout was pulled from the event and will be rescheduled for the future.

A welterweight bout between Andrey Koreshkov and Paul Daley was scheduled for this event. However, due to undisclosed reasons, Koreshkov pulled out of the bout and was replaced by Wendell Giácomo.

At the weigh-ins, Alan Carlos missed weight for his bout, weighing in at 189.2 pounds, 3.2 pounds over the middleweight non-title fight limit. The bout proceeded at catchweight and Carlos was fined a percentage of his purse which went to his opponent Charlie Ward.

== Results ==
Main Card (Showtime)
Weight class				Method	Round	Time	Notes
Welterweight	Logan Storley	def.	Michael Page	Decision (split) (48–47, 47–48, 49–46)	5	5:00	(Note: For the interim Bellator Welterweight World Championship.)
Middleweight	Fabian Edwards	def.	Lyoto Machida	KO (elbow and punches)	1	3:18
Women's Flyweight	Kana Watanabe	def.	Denise Kielholtz	Submission (triangle choke)	2	3:03	(Note: Kielholtz was deducted 1 point in Round 2 for kicking Watanabe in the head while she was a downed opponent.)
Welterweight	Paul Daley	def.	Wendell Giácomo	KO (punches)	2	4:09
Light Heavyweight	Simon Biyong	def.	Luke Trainer	Decision (unanimous) (29–27, 28–27, 29–28)	3	5:00
Preliminary card (Youtube/Pluto TV)
Featherweight	Daniel Weichel	def.	Rob Whiteford	TKO (punches)	1	1:12
Women's Flyweight	Elina Kallionidou	def.	Kate Jackson	TKO (punches)	2	4:53
Welterweight	Oliver Enkamp	def.	Mark Lemminger	Submission (inverted triangle)	3	0:25
Lightweight	Alfie Davis	vs.	Tim Wilde	Draw (majority) (29–27, 28–28, 28–28)	3	5:00	(Note: Wilde was deducted one point in Round 1 due to fence grabbing.)
Featherweight	Andrew Fisher	def.	Attila Korkmaz	Decision (unanimous) (29–28, 29–28, 29–28)	3	5:00
Catchweight (189.2 lb)	Charlie Ward	def.	Alan Carlos	Decision (unanimous) (30–27, 30–27, 30–25)	3	5:00	(Note: Originally a middleweight bout; Carlos missed weight)
Light Heavyweight	Maciej Różański	def.	Lee Chadwick	Decision (unanimous) (29–28, 30–27, 30–27)	3	5:00
Women's Strawweight	Chiara Penco	def.	Lanchana Green	Decision (unanimous) (29–28, 30–27, 30–27)	3	5:00

== See also ==
- 2022 in Bellator MMA
- List of Bellator MMA events
- List of current Bellator fighters
