= Mateus Fernandes =

Mateus Fernandes may refer to:

- Mateus Fernandes (architect) (died 1515), Portuguese architect
- Mateus Fernandes (fighter) (1997–2019), Brazilian amateur fighter
- Mateus Fernandes (footballer) (born 2004), Portuguese football midfielder for Tottenham

== See also ==
- Matheus Fernandes (born 1998), Brazilian football midfielder for Athletico Paranaense
