= Charles Rosa =

American mixed martial artist

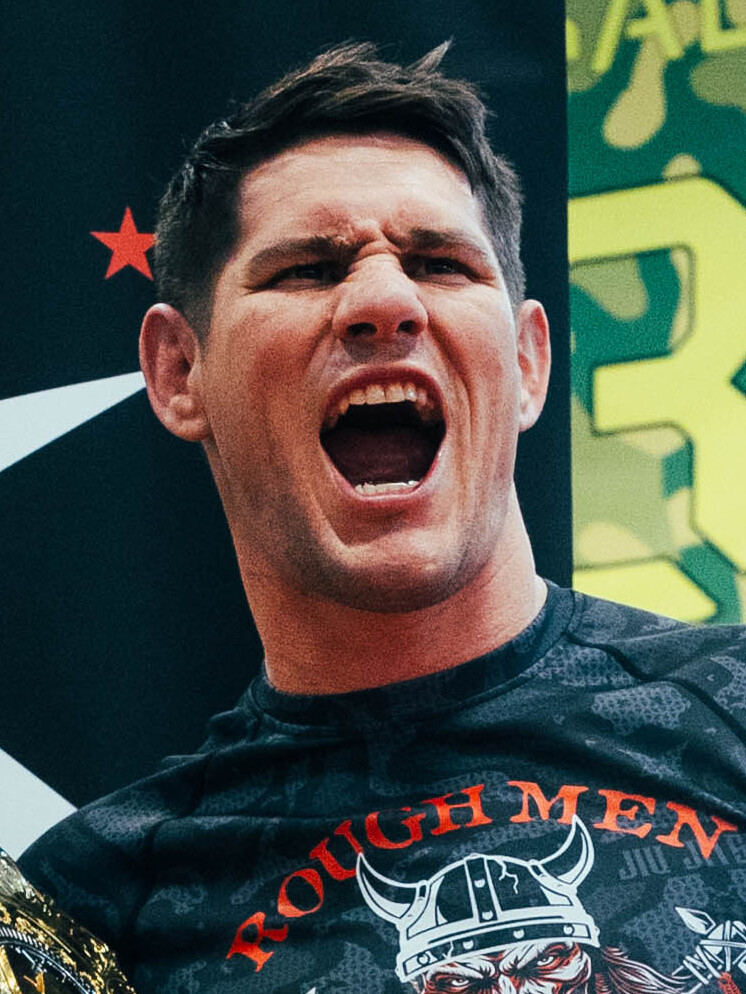
- Rosa in 2025
- Born: August 24, 1986 (age 40); Peabody, Massachusetts, U.S.
- Other names: Boston Strong
- Height: 5 ft 9 in (1.75 m)
- Weight: 145 lb (66 kg; 10 st 5 lb)
- Division: Featherweight; Lightweight; Welterweight
- Reach: 71 in (180 cm)
- Fighting out of: Boca Raton, Florida, United States
- Team: American Top Team (2008–2021); American Combat Gym (2021–present)
- Rank: Black belt in Brazilian Jiu-Jitsu under Ricardo Liborio
- Years active: 2012–present

Mixed martial arts record
- Total: 28
- Wins: 19
- By knockout: 5
- By submission: 11
- By decision: 3
- Losses: 9
- By knockout: 1
- By decision: 8

Other information
- University: Johnson & Wales University
- Mixed martial arts record from Sherdog

Charles Rosa (born August 24, 1986) is an American professional mixed martial artist currently competing in the Featherweight division. A professional since 2012, he is most notable for his time in the Ultimate Fighting Championship. He also competes in CES MMA where he is the current Lightweight Champion.

== Background ==
Charles, of Italian descent is the son of Chucky and Mary Rosa and was born and raised in Peabody, Massachusetts. Rosa's father, grandfather, and uncle were all professional boxers. Rosa had two older brothers, Domenic and Vincent, who both died from accidental drug overdoses. He also has a sister, Teresa, and two younger brothers, Lucas and Francis. Growing up, Rosa played football, hockey, lacrosse, and also trained in karate. He attended Peabody High School.

Rosa continued playing lacrosse and hockey at Johnson & Wales University, where he also earned a degree in the culinary arts. Rosa would get kicked off the hockey for getting into too many fights during practices and games. After graduating from the college, Rosa later relocated to Florida to find a fresh start and took a job as a chef at an upscale restaurant in Delray Beach. Looking for a boxing gym, Rosa stumbled upon American Top Team gym. Not knowing any better on his first day at the gym he asked at the time UFC fighter Cole Miller to spar him. Miller initially didn’t take Rosa’s offer seriously but eventually accepted. After seeing Rosa’s efforts against Miller, trainer Charles McCarthy seeing Rosa’s potential would then help him begin training in mixed martial arts. Rosa would train for 1 year before taking his first fight. During the early parts of his career Rosa continued to work as a chef. He Later stated

“My first fight I was so scared because you never ask the chef for a Saturday night off,” “He sometimes freaked out when people asked for a weekend night off, but I knew he was a martial artist himself because he said he did Aikido. I asked if I could leave work at 7pm to fight and that I should be back by 10:30pm.”

Rosa Boss respected what Rosa was doing and let him take the night off. This led to a trend for Rosa on fight nights where Rosa would fight on a Saturday and either come back the same night or the next day, depending on how taxing the bout was.

== Mixed martial arts career ==
=== Early career ===
Rosa compiled an amateur MMA record of 11–2 and made his professional debut in 2012 competing in regional promotions across the Northeastern United States. He compiled an undefeated record of 9–0, finishing all of his opponents before signing with the UFC in the summer of 2014.

=== Ultimate Fighting Championship ===
Rosa made his promotional debut as a short notice replacement against Dennis Siver on October 4, 2014, at UFC Fight Night 53, replacing an injured Robert Whiteford. Siver won the back and forth fight via unanimous decision. Subsequently, both participants earned Fight of the Night honors.

Rosa faced Sean Soriano on January 18, 2015, at UFC Fight Night 59. Rosa won the bout via a d’race choke submission in the third round.

Rosa then faced Yair Rodríguez on June 13, 2015, at UFC 188. He lost the back and forth fight by split decision. Despite the loss, Rosa also earned his second Fight of the Night bonus award.

Rosa was originally expected to face Jimy Hettes on January 17, 2016, at UFC Fight Night 81. However, Hettes pulled out of the fight in the week leading up to the event and was very briefly replaced by promotional newcomer Augusto Mendes. Just two days later, Mendes was removed from the fight and was replaced by Kyle Bochniak. Rosa won the fight via unanimous decision.

Rosa faced Shane Burgos on April 8, 2017, at UFC 210. He lost the fight via TKO in the third round. Both participants were awarded Fight of the Night for their performance.

Rosa was expected to face Mizuto Hirota on September 23, 2017, at UFC Fight Night 117. However, the bout was canceled on the day of the weigh-ins as Hirota missed weight and was deemed medically unfit to compete.

Rosa was expected to face Dan Ige on January 20, 2018, at UFC 220. However, on December 22, 2017, it was reported that Rosa was pulled from the event due to neck injury.

I had that moment where the doctor said, ‘You should consider hanging it up [due to your neck injury]'. That almost brought tears to my eyes when he said that. There was silence in the room. I stopped and I said, ‘What’s the other option? He didn’t really say, so I told him what the other option is: ‘I’m going to defy all odds and I’m going to beat this. I’m going to work hard and I’m going to do everything I can possibly do to come back.

After hiatus for 30 months due to neck injury, Rosa made a miraculous return and faced Manny Bermudez on October 18, 2019, at UFC on ESPN 6. At the weigh-in, Bermudez weighed in at 148 pounds, 2 pounds over the featherweight non-title fight limit of 146. The bout was held at catchweight. Bermudez was fined 20% of his purse which went to Rosa. He won the fight via an arm bar submission in round one. This win earned him the Performance of the Night award.

Rosa was scheduled to face Bryce Mitchell on May 2, 2020, at UFC Fight Night: Hermansson vs. Weidman. However, on April 9, Dana White, the president of UFC announced that this event was postponed and the bout eventually took place on May 9, 2020, at UFC 249. He lost the fight via unanimous decision.

Rosa faced Kevin Aguilar on June 13, 2020, at UFC on ESPN: Eye vs. Calvillo. He won the fight via split decision.

Rosa faced Darrick Minner on February 20, 2021, at UFC Fight Night: Blaydes vs. Lewis. He lost the fight via unanimous decision.

Rosa faced Justin Jaynes on June 26, 2021, at UFC Fight Night 190. He won the fight by split decision.

As the last fight of his prevailing contract, Rosa faced Damon Jackson on October 9, 2021, at UFC Fight Night 194. He lost the fight via unanimous decision.

Rosa, as a replacement for Gabriel Benítez on three days notice, is scheduled to face T.J. Brown on January 15, 2022, at UFC on ESPN: Kattar vs. Chikadze. In conjunction with the bout, Rosa signed a new four-fight contract with the UFC. He lost the fight via unanimous decision.

Rosa faced Nathaniel Wood on July 23, 2022, at UFC Fight Night: Blaydes vs. Aspinall. He lost the bout via unanimous decision.

On August 10, 2023, it was announced that Rosa was no longer on the UFC roster. Rosa would later state during a 2024 interview that he still had 2 fights left on his contract when he was removed. But decided to ask for his release due to the UFC only being able to offer him one fight a year and with Rosa getting older he didn’t want to sit around and waste the rest his career.

=== Post-UFC Career ===
==== CES ====
After leaving the UFC, Rosa returned to the regional promotion where he fought a majority of his early career that being CES. He faced Jonathan Gary on October 20, 2023 in the main event of CES 75. Rosa would win the fight via guillotine in the second round. He then made his commentary debut at CES 76.

Rosa then had a fight in the Florida based promotion LeLeo Code MMA on December 16, 2023. He faced Paul Teague in the main event winning via first round TKO.

Rosa then faced Josh Harvey for the vacant CES MMA Lightweight title in the main event of CES 77 on May 3, 2024. He won the fight via first round guillotine submission.

Rosa defended the CES MMA Lightweight title against Patrick Benson in the main event of CES 78 on August 3, 2024. Rosa won the fight via technical knockout in the first round.

==== Gamebred FC ====
Rosa had his first bare knuckle MMA fight against Peter Barrett on November 15, 2024. On the main card of Gamebred promotions Costa Vs Davis. Rosa won the fight via anaconda choke in the third round.

Rosa faced Jhonasky Sojo on April 10, 2026 in the Gamebred promotions event in the Dominican Republic. He lost the fight via unanimous decision.

==== Global Fight League ====
On December 11, 2024, it was announced that Rosa was signed by Global Fight League. On January 24, 2025, it was announced Charles was drafted to the Miami GFL team.

Rosa was scheduled to face Khumoyun Tukhtamuradov in the inaugural Global Fight League event on May 24, 2025 at GFL 1. However, all GFL events were cancelled indefinitely.

== BKFC ==
=== BKFC Ice Wars ===
On June 3, 2025 Rosa announced that he had signed with the BKFCs new promotion called BKFC ice wars where fighters will have sanctioned “hockey fights” on ice.

Rosa fought Reid Krasowski on October 10, 2025 in the co main-event of BKFC ice wars 3 and won with a second round TKO.

=== Bare-knuckle fighting ===
Rosa made his BKFC debut at BKFC 92 on August 29, 2026 against Charon Spain. He lost the fight by split decision.

== Grappling career ==
Rosa faced Julio Cesar Chaves on JUNE 3, 2022 in a grappling match on Titan Fighting Championship 77. The bout would end in a draw after 2 rounds and a 10 minute overtime.

== Personal life ==
In addition to competing, Rosa works as a chef at an upscale steakhouse. During his time in the UFC Rosa’s skills became well known among other fighters, this resulted in Rosa making food for nearly a dozen people at the home of UFC veteran Stephen Thompson in South Carolina.

Rosa is engaged with luxury real estate agent Shannon Southcomb the couple had their first child together in 2025 a daughter named Bella. The couple lives in Boca Raton. He is a fan of the Boston Bruins.

Rosa’s family runs a non profit charity that helps stop substance abuse. Rosa himself is involved in other charitable events and visits sick children at hospitals.

Rosa also helps train his younger brother Lucas who is also a pro MMA fighter. The two would even fight on the same card at CES 78. Rosa currently serves a mentor and training partner with UFC fighter Daniel Marcos with the two being roommates together for a period of time.

Rosa currently participates in armed forces entertainment tours, in which he travels to military bases around the world to train United States service members in mixed martial arts.

== Championships and accomplishments ==
- Ultimate Fighting Championship
  - Fight of the Night (Three times) vs. Dennis Siver, Yair Rodríguez, and Shane Burgos
  - Performance of the Night (One time) vs. Manny Bermudez
  - Latest submission in a three-round featherweight bout (R3 at 4:43) (vs. Sean Soriano)
  - UFC.com Awards
    - 2015: Ranked #7 Fight of the Year vs. Yair Rodríguez

CES MMA

- CES MMA World lightweight Champion (current)
- One successful title defense

BKFC

- Fight of the Night (One time) vs. Charon Spain

Amateur

- Rise of the Warrior Featherweight Champion (one time)

== Mixed martial arts record ==
Professional record breakdown
28 matches	19 wins	9 losses
By knockout	5	1
By submission	11	0
By decision	3	8

Res.	Record	Opponent	Method	Event	Date	Round	Time	Location	Notes
Loss	19–9	Jhonasky Sojo	Decision (unanimous)	Gamebred Bareknuckle MMA 9	April 10, 2026	3	5:00	Santo Domingo, Dominican Republic	Gamebred FC Lightweight Grand Prix Round of 16.
Win	19–8	Peter Barrett	Submission (anaconda choke)	Gamebred Bareknuckle MMA 8	November 15, 2024	3	3:21	Biloxi, Mississippi, United States	
Win	18–8	Patrick Benson	TKO (punches)	CES MMA 78	August 2, 2024	1	4:17	Ledyard, Connecticut, United States	Defended the CES MMA Lightweight Championship.
Win	17–8	Josh Harvey	Submission (guillotine choke)	CES MMA 77	May 3, 2024	1	2:45	Ledyard, Connecticut, United States	Won the CES MMA Lightweight Championship.
Win	16–8	Paul Teague	TKO (punches)	LeLeo Code MMA: Winter Fightfest Pro	December 16, 2023	1	1:41	Altamonte Springs, Florida, United States	Welterweight bout.
Win	15–8	Jonathan Gary	Submission (guillotine choke)	CES MMA 75	October 20, 2023	2	0:47	Ledyard, Connecticut, United States	Return to Lightweight.
Loss	14–8	Nathaniel Wood	Decision (unanimous)	UFC Fight Night: Blaydes vs. Aspinall	July 23, 2022	3	5:00	London, England	
Loss	14–7	T.J. Brown	Decision (unanimous)	UFC on ESPN: Kattar vs. Chikadze	January 15, 2022	3	5:00	Las Vegas, Nevada, United States	Lightweight bout.
Loss	14–6	Damon Jackson	Decision (unanimous)	UFC Fight Night: Dern vs. Rodriguez	October 8, 2021	3	5:00	Las Vegas, Nevada, United States	
Win	14–5	Justin Jaynes	Decision (split)	UFC Fight Night: Gane vs. Volkov	June 26, 2021	3	5:00	Las Vegas, Nevada, United States	
Loss	13–5	Darrick Minner	Decision (unanimous)	UFC Fight Night: Blaydes vs. Lewis	February 20, 2021	3	5:00	Las Vegas, Nevada, United States	
Win	13–4	Kevin Aguilar	Decision (split)	UFC on ESPN: Eye vs. Calvillo	June 13, 2020	3	5:00	Las Vegas, Nevada, United States	Lightweight bout.
Loss	12–4	Bryce Mitchell	Decision (unanimous)	UFC 249	May 9, 2020	3	5:00	Jacksonville, Florida, United States	
Win	12–3	Manny Bermudez	Submission (armbar)	UFC on ESPN: Reyes vs. Weidman	October 18, 2019	1	2:46	Boston, Massachusetts, United States	Catchweight (148 lb) bout; Bermudez missed weight. Performance of the Night.
Loss	11–3	Shane Burgos	TKO (punches)	UFC 210	April 8, 2017	3	1:59	Buffalo, New York, United States	Fight of the Night.
Win	11–2	Kyle Bochniak	Decision (unanimous)	UFC Fight Night: Dillashaw vs. Cruz	January 17, 2016	3	5:00	Boston, Massachusetts, United States	
Loss	10–2	Yair Rodríguez	Decision (split)	UFC 188	June 13, 2015	3	5:00	Mexico City, Mexico	Fight of the Night.
Win	10–1	Sean Soriano	Submission (D'Arce choke)	UFC Fight Night: McGregor vs. Siver	January 18, 2015	3	4:43	Boston, Massachusetts, United States	
Loss	9–1	Dennis Siver	Decision (unanimous)	UFC Fight Night: Nelson vs. Story	October 4, 2014	3	5:00	Stockholm, Sweden	Fight of the Night.
Win	9–0	Jake Constant	Submission (armbar)	CES MMA 25	August 8, 2014	1	3:36	Lincoln, Rhode Island, United States	Catchweight (149 lb) bout.
Win	8–0	Brylan Van Artsdalen	Submission (armbar)	CES MMA 22	March 14, 2014	1	3:25	Lincoln, Rhode Island, United States	Featherweight debut.
Win	7–0	Keith Richardson	TKO (punches)	Fight Lab 35	February 8, 2014	2	2:08	Charlotte, North Carolina, United States	Lightweight bout.
Win	6–0	Ralph Johnson	Submission (anaconda choke)	CES MMA 20	December 6, 2013	1	3:03	Lincoln, Rhode Island, United States	
Win	5–0	Steve McCabe	Submission (Peruvian necktie)	CES MMA: Rise or Fall	October 4, 2013	1	1:39	Lincoln, Rhode Island, United States	Lightweight bout.
Win	4–0	Sylvester Murataj	TKO (punches)	CES MMA: Gold Rush	August 29, 2013	1	0:46	Lincoln, Rhode Island, United States	Welterweight debut.
Win	3–0	Aaron Steadman	Submission (triangle choke)	CFA 11	May 24, 2013	1	3:26	Coral Gables, Florida, United States	
Win	2–0	Jason Jones	TKO (punches)	CFA 9	January 19, 2013	1	3:52	Coral Gables, Florida, United States	Lightweight debut.
Win	1–0	Hauley Tillman	Submission (armbar)	CFA 9	August 24, 2012	1	1:56	Fort Lauderdale, Florida, United States	Catchweight (158 lb) bout.

== Bare-knuckle boxing record ==
Professional record breakdown
1 match	0 wins	1 loss
By decision	0	1

Res.	Record	Opponent	Method	Event	Date	Round	Time	Location	Notes
Loss	0–1	Charon Spain	Decision (split)	BKFC 92	August 29, 2026	5	2:00	Boston, Massachusetts, United States	

== Filmography ==
Television
Year	Title	Role	Reference
June 8, 2015	UFC Embedded: Vlog Series UFC 188: Episodes 1 - 6	Himself	
February 13, 2016	Wicked bites UFC Fight Night - Boston	Himself	
August 14, 2016	UFC Ultimate insider season 5 episode 525	Himself	
December 11, 2021	High Rollerz episode $10k	Himself	

UFC VIDEO GAMES
Year	Title	Role	Reference
2020	EA Sports UFC 4	Himself	
2023	EA Sports UFC 5	Himself	

== See also ==
- List of male mixed martial artists
