= UFC on ESPN: Reyes vs. Weidman =

UFC mixed martial arts event in 2019

- The poster for UFC on ESPN: Reyes vs. Weidman
- Promotion: Ultimate Fighting Championship
- Date: October 18, 2019
- Venue: TD Garden
- City: Boston, Massachusetts
- Attendance: 12,066
- Total gate: $1,124,765

Event chronology
UFC Fight Night: Joanna vs. Waterson	UFC on ESPN: Reyes vs. Weidman	UFC Fight Night: Maia vs. Askren

UFC on ESPN: Reyes vs. Weidman (also known as UFC on ESPN 6) was a mixed martial arts event produced by the Ultimate Fighting Championship that took place on October 18, 2019 at the TD Garden in Boston, Massachusetts.

== Background ==
A light heavyweight bout between Dominick Reyes and former UFC Middleweight Champion Chris Weidman served as the event headliner.

A featherweight bout between Zabit Magomedsharipov and Calvin Kattar was scheduled to take place at this event. However, in mid-September promotion officials elected to reschedule the pairing for "UFC Fight Night: dos Santos vs. Volkov", which was later retitled to UFC Fight Night: Magomedsharipov vs. Kattar. The fight was moved for undisclosed reasons.

A middleweight bout between Brendan Allen and Eric Spicely was scheduled for the event. However, Spicely was forced to withdraw from the event due to an undisclosed reason. He was replaced by Kevin Holland.

At the weigh-ins, Deron Winn and Manny Bermudez missed the required weight for their respective fights. Winn weighed in at 188.5 pounds, 2.5 pounds over the middleweight non-title fight limit of 186. Bermudez weighed in at 148 pounds, 2 pounds over the featherweight non-title fight limit of 146. Both bouts were held at a catchweight. Winn and Bermudez were fined 20% of their purse, which went to their opponents Darren Stewart and Charles Rosa respectively.

== Results ==
Main Card (ESPN2)
Weight class				Method	Round	Time	Notes
Light Heavyweight	Dominick Reyes	def.	Chris Weidman	KO (punches)	1	1:43
Featherweight	Yair Rodríguez	def.	Jeremy Stephens	Decision (unanimous) (29–28, 29–28, 29–28)	3	5:00
Heavyweight	Greg Hardy	vs.	Ben Sosoli	No Contest (overturned)	3	5:00	(Note: Originally a unanimous decision (29–28, 29–28, 29–28) win for Hardy; overturned after he used an inhaler between rounds 2 and 3.)
Lightweight	Joe Lauzon	def.	Jonathan Pearce	TKO (punches)	1	1:33
Women's Flyweight	Maycee Barber	def.	Gillian Robertson	TKO (punches)	1	3:04
Catchweight (188.5 lb)	Darren Stewart	def.	Deron Winn	Decision (split) (29–28, 28–29, 29–28)	3	5:00
Preliminary Card (ESPN2)
Catchweight (148 lb)	Charles Rosa	def.	Manny Bermudez	Verbal Submission (armbar)	1	2:46
Women's Flyweight	Molly McCann	def.	Diana Belbiţă	Decision (unanimous) (30–25, 30–25, 30–25)	3	5:00	(Note: Belbiţă was deducted a point in round 2 for grabbing the cage.)
Featherweight	Sean Woodson	def.	Kyle Bochniak	Decision (unanimous) (30–26, 30–27, 30–27)	3	5:00
Bantamweight	Randy Costa	def.	Boston Salmon	TKO (punches)	1	2:15
Welterweight	Sean Brady	def.	Court McGee	Decision (unanimous) (29–28, 30–27, 30–27)	3	5:00
Middleweight	Brendan Allen	def.	Kevin Holland	Submission (rear-naked choke)	2	3:38
Heavyweight	Tanner Boser	def.	Daniel Spitz	Decision (unanimous) (30–27, 30–27, 30–27)	3	5:00

== Bonus awards ==
The following fighters received $50,000 bonuses.

- Fight of the Night: Yair Rodríguez vs. Jeremy Stephens
- Performance of the Night: Dominick Reyes and Charles Rosa

== See also ==
- List of UFC events
- 2019 in UFC
- List of current UFC fighters
