= UFC Fight Night: Swanson vs. Ortega =

UFC mixed martial arts event in 2017

- The poster for UFC Fight Night: Swanson vs. Ortega
- Promotion: Ultimate Fighting Championship
- Date: December 9, 2017
- Venue: Save Mart Center
- City: Fresno, California
- Attendance: 7,605
- Total gate: $568,290

Event chronology
UFC 218: Holloway vs. Aldo 2	UFC Fight Night: Swanson vs. Ortega	UFC on Fox: Lawler vs. dos Anjos

UFC Fight Night: Swanson vs. Ortega (also known as UFC Fight Night 123) was a mixed martial arts event produced by the Ultimate Fighting Championship that was held on December 9, 2017, at Save Mart Center in Fresno, California.

== Background ==
While the UFC has hosted many events in Northern California, the event marked the promotion's first visit to Fresno. Former Zuffa subsidiary Strikeforce previously contested five events in Fresno, the most recent in October 2010.

A featherweight bout between Cub Swanson and Brian Ortega served as the event headliner.

Promotional newcomer John Phillips was expected to face Eryk Anders at the event. However, Phillips was removed from the card on November 2 and was replaced by fellow newcomer Markus Perez Echeimberg.

Rani Yahya was expected to face Aljamain Sterling at this event. However, Yahya was forced to pull out from the card on November 7 due to injury. He was replaced by former WSOF Bantamweight Champion Marlon Moraes.

Bryan Caraway was expected to face Luke Sanders at the event. However, on November 20, Caraway pulled out of the fight due to undisclosed reasons. He was replaced by Andre Soukhamthath.

Carls John de Tomas and Alex Perez were expected to meet in a flyweight bout at this event. However, the CSAC elected to move the bout to the bantamweight division as they were concerned with De Tomas weight during fight week.

Benito Lopez was fined 10% of his show money by the CSAC due to shoving his opponent Albert Morales at the weigh-ins ceremony. That money will go directly to the commission.

== Results ==
Main Card (Fox Sports 1)
Weight class				Method	Round	Time	Notes
Featherweight	Brian Ortega	def.	Cub Swanson	Submission (guillotine choke)	2	3:22
Featherweight	Gabriel Benítez	def.	Jason Knight	Decision (unanimous) (30–26, 30–26, 29–27)	3	5:00	(Note: Knight was deducted one point in round 1 for biting Benítez's fingers.)
Bantamweight	Marlon Moraes	def.	Aljamain Sterling	KO (knee)	1	1:07
Lightweight	Scott Holtzman	def.	Darrell Horcher	Decision (unanimous) (30–27, 30–27, 30–27)	3	5:00
Middleweight	Eryk Anders	def.	Markus Perez Echeimberg	Decision (unanimous) (30–26, 30–25, 29–28)	3	5:00
Bantamweight	Benito Lopez	def.	Albert Morales	Decision (unanimous) (30–27, 29–28, 29–28)	3	5:00
Preliminary Card (Fox Sports 1)
Women's Flyweight	Alexis Davis	def.	Liz Carmouche	Decision (split) (29–28, 28–29, 29–28)	3	5:00
Bantamweight	Andre Soukhamthath	def.	Luke Sanders	TKO (punches)	2	1:06
Bantamweight	Alex Perez	def.	Carls John de Tomas	Submission (D'Arce choke)	2	1:54
Bantamweight	Frankie Saenz	def.	Merab Dvalishvili	Decision (split) (28–29, 29–28, 29–28)	3	5:00
Preliminary Card (UFC Fight Pass)
Bantamweight	Alejandro Pérez	def.	Iuri Alcântara	Decision (unanimous) (30–27, 29–28, 29–28)	3	5:00
Lightweight	Davi Ramos	def.	Chris Gruetzemacher	Submission (rear-naked choke)	3	0:50
Middleweight	Trevin Giles	def.	Antônio Braga Neto	TKO (punches)	3	2:27

== Bonus awards ==
The following fighters were awarded $50,000 bonuses:

- Fight of the Night: Brian Ortega vs. Cub Swanson
- Performance of the Night: Brian Ortega and Marlon Moraes

== Reported payout ==
The following is the reported payout to the fighters as reported to the California State Athletic Commission. It does not include sponsor money and also does not include the UFC's traditional "fight night" bonuses. The total disclosed payout for the event was $866,000.

- Brian Ortega: $58,000 (includes $29,000 win bonus) def. Cub Swanson: $76,000
- Gabriel Benítez: $28,000 (includes $14,000 win bonus) def. Jason Knight: $31,000
- Marlon Moraes: $146,000 (includes $73,000 win bonus) def. Aljamian Sterling: $36,000
- Scott Holtzman: $40,000 (includes $20,000 win bonus) def. Darrell Horcher: $15,000
- Eryk Anders: $28,000 (includes $14,000 win bonus) def. Markus Perez: $12,000
- Benito Lopez: $19,000 (includes $10,000 win bonus) def. Albert Morales: $15,000 ^
- Alexis Davis: $64,000 (includes $32,000 win bonus) def. Liz Carmouche: $30,000
- Andre Soukhamthath: $20,000 (includes $10,000 win bonus) def. Luke Sanders: $12,000
- Alex Perez: $20,000 (includes $10,000 win bonus) def. Carls John de Tomas: $10,000
- Frankie Saenz: $40,000 (includes $20,000 win bonus) def. Merab Dvalishvili: $10,000
- Alejandro Pérez: $46,000 (includes $23,000 win bonus) def. Iuri Alcântara: $29,000
- Davi Ramos: $20,000 (includes $10,000 win bonus) def. Chris Gruetzemacher: $12,000
- Trevin Giles: $28,000 (includes $14,000 win bonus) def. Antônio Braga Neto: $10,000

^ Benito Lopez was fined 10 percent of his purse ($1,000) for shoving his opponent at the weigh-ins ceremony. That money went directly to the commission.

== Aftermath ==
On December 29, it was announced that Carl John de Tomas failed a USADA drug test stemming from his appearance at this event following his weigh-in. On February 5, he accepted a one-year suspension.

== See also ==
- List of UFC events
- 2017 in UFC
