= Benito Lopez =

American mixed martial arts fighter

- Born: 6 April 1994 (age 32); Oroville, California, United States
- Nickname: Golden Boy
- Height: 5 ft 10 in (1.78 m)
- Weight: 135 lb (61 kg; 9 st 9 lb)
- Division: Bantamweight
- Reach: 73 in (185 cm)
- Fighting out of: Oroville, California
- Team: Team Alpha Male
- Years active: 2014–present

Mixed martial arts record
- Total: 13
- Wins: 11
- By knockout: 4
- By submission: 2
- By decision: 5
- Losses: 2
- By submission: 2

Other information
- Mixed martial arts record from Sherdog

Benito Francisco Lopez (born 6 April 1994) is an American mixed martial artist. He most recently competed in the Bantamweight division of the Ultimate Fighting Championship (UFC).

== Combat career ==
=== Mixed martial arts career ===
==== Early career ====
In April 2014, Lopez won his debut MMA debut fight against Oscar Ramirez at Bellator 115 event at Reno, Nevada, United States.

Later in September, Lopez signed to WFC and won two MMA matches versus Drey Mitchell at the WFC 11 - Mitchell vs. Major event and against Matt Wagy at the WFC 13 - Huckaba vs. Mitchell event. In 2016 and the first half of the 2017, Lopez signed a multi-fight contract with the King of the Cage, winning all three fights against Rick James, Journey Newson and Benjamin Vinson, respectively.

After the fight against Steven Peterson at Dana White's Contender Series 7, Lopez was awarded with UFC contract, together with Joby Sanchez.

==== Ultimate Fighting Championship ====
On 9 December 2017, Lopez was scheduled to face Martin Day at UFC Fight Night: Swanson vs. Ortega. However Day pulled out of the event due to a knee injury and he was replaced by Albert Morales. He won his UFC debut fight via unanimous decision.

Lopez was scheduled to face Manny Bermudez on 26 January 2019 at UFC 233. As a result of the cancellation of UFC 233, the pair was rescheduled to UFC on ESPN: Ngannou vs. Velasquez on 17 February 2019. He lost the fight via guillotine choke submission in round one.

Lopez was scheduled to face Ricky Simon at UFC 227 on 4 August 2018. However, it was reported that Lopez pulled out from the bout for undisclosed reason and he was replaced by Montel Jackson.

Lopez faced Vince Morales on 13 July 2019 at UFC Fight Night: de Randamie vs. Ladd. He won the fight via unanimous decision.

After a three-year layoff, Lopez faced Mario Bautista on 5 November 2022 at UFC Fight Night 214. At the weigh-ins, Lopez weighed in at 138.5 pounds, two and a half pounds over the bantamweight non-title fight limit. Lopez will be fined 20% of this individual purse which will go to his opponent Bautista. He lost the fight via a reverse triangle armbar submission in the first round.

After the loss to Bautista, Lopez was released from the UFC.

== Mixed martial arts record ==
Professional record breakdown
13 matches	11 wins	2 losses
By knockout	4	0
By submission	2	2
By decision	5	0

Res.	Record	Opponent	Method	Event	Date	Round	Time	Location	Notes
Win	11–2	R.J. Hoyt	TKO (punches)	PureCombat: Spirit Warrior 4	20 June 2026	1	3:43	Oroville, California, United States	Catchweight (140 lb) bout.
Loss	10–2	Mario Bautista	Submission (reverse triangle armbar)	UFC Fight Night: Rodriguez vs. Lemos	5 November 2022	1	4:54	Las Vegas, Nevada, United States	Catchweight (138.5 lb) bout; Lopez missed weight.
Win	10–1	Vince Morales	Decision (unanimous)	UFC Fight Night: de Randamie vs. Ladd	13 July 2019	3	5:00	Sacramento, California, United States	
Loss	9–1	Manny Bermudez	Submission (guillotine choke)	UFC on ESPN: Ngannou vs. Velasquez	17 February 2019	1	3:09	Phoenix, Arizona, United States	
Win	9–0	Albert Morales	Decision (unanimous)	UFC Fight Night: Swanson vs. Ortega	9 December 2017	3	5:00	Fresno, California, United States	
Win	8–0	Steven Peterson	Decision (split)	Dana White's Contender Series 7	22 August 2017	3	5:00	Las Vegas, Nevada, United States	
Win	7–0	Benjamin Vinson	TKO (Doctor Stoppage)	KOTC: Flashback	June 24, 2017	1	5:00	Oroville, California, United States	
Win	6–0	Journey Newson	KO (punches)	KOTC: Unchallenged	October 8, 2016	1	3:04	Oroville, California, United States	
Win	5–0	Rick James	KO (punch)	KOTC: Home Turf	March 19, 2016	1	0:08	Oroville, California, United States	
Win	4–0	Stephone Taylor	Submission (arm-triangle choke)	International FC: Warriors Challenge 36	July 12, 2015	1	0:56	Oroville, California, United States	
Win	3–0	Matt Wagy	Submission (guillotine choke)	West Coast FC 13	February 28, 2015	1	0:48	Sacramento, California, United States	Bantamweight debut.
Win	2–0	Drey Mitchell	Decision (unanimous)	West Coast FC 11	September 13, 2014	3	5:00	Sacramento, California, United States	Catchweight (140 lb) bout.
Win	1–0	Oscar Ramirez	Decision (unanimous)	Bellator 115	April 4, 2014	3	5:00	Reno, Nevada, United States	Flyweight debut.

== See also ==
- List of male mixed martial artists
