= Kate Jackson (fighter) =

British mixed martial arts (MMA) fighter

- Born: Lostwithiel, England
- Height: 5 ft 5 in (1.65 m)
- Weight: 125 lb (57 kg; 8 st 13 lb)
- Division: Flyweight
- Reach: 67 in (170 cm)
- Fighting out of: Newquay, England
- Team: Koncept Gym
- Years active: 2009–2022

Mixed martial arts record
- Total: 18
- Wins: 11
- By knockout: 6
- By submission: 1
- By decision: 4
- Losses: 6
- By knockout: 3
- By decision: 3
- Draws: 1

Other information
- Mixed martial arts record from Sherdog

Kate Jackson is a British retired mixed martial artist, most notable for fighting for Bellator MMA, where she challenged for the promotion's flyweight championship, and on The Ultimate Fighter 23, losing to eventual TUF 23 winner Tatiana Suarez.

== Background ==
Having done karate since 2001 and judo from 2002 since the age of 15, Jackson kept going with whatever martial arts she could find at university, be it traditional jiujitsu, kickboxing and occasional BJJ classes. She found an MMA gym, Koncept, in Newquay Cornwall in 2008, and that’s when her interest and future career in MMA started.

== Mixed martial arts career ==
=== Early career ===
Jackson made her MMA debut on 10 May 2009, earning a TKO victory over Kate Rennie. She would win four of her first five professional fights, before suffering her second career loss against future UFC women's strawweight champion Joanna Jedrzejczyk.

=== The Ultimate Fighter 23 ===
Competing at strawweight, Jackson appeared on the 23rd season of The Ultimate Fighter in 2016, where she was a member of Team Gadelha, coached by Claudia Gadelha. In an interesting coincidence, the coach of the opposing team was Joanna Jedrzejczyk, against whom Jackson had previously competed.

Jackson defeated Irene Cabello by TKO to gain entry into the TUF house. She defeated Ashley Yoder via unanimous decision to advance to the semifinal round. There, Jackson was defeated by Tatiana Suarez by submission.

=== Bellator MMA ===
Following her stint on The Ultimate Fighter 23, Jackson returned to the regional scene in her native England for a single fight before being signed by Bellator MMA in 2017 to compete in their women's flyweight division. She won her promotional debut at Bellator 182, defeating Colleen Schneider.

In her second fight for the promotion, Jackson faced Valerie Letourneau at Bellator 191 in December 2017. She lost the fight by a unanimous decision.

In her third fight for the promotion, Jackson faced an undefeated Russian prospect, Anastasia Yankova at Bellator 200 on 25 May 2018. She won the fight via unanimous decision.

Jackson next fought Lena Ovchynnikova at Bellator 223 on 22 June 2019. She won the fight by TKO in the first round.

On the strength of her two fight win streak, Jackson was selected as the next title challenger for the Bellator Women's Flyweight World Championship against champion Ilima-Lei Macfarlane. The fight was the main event of Bellator 236 in Honolulu, Hawaii on 21 December 2019. Jackson lost the fight via unanimous decision.

Jackson faced Denise Kielholtz at Bellator 247 on 1 October 2020. She lost the bout via knockout just 43 seconds into the first round.

Jackson faced Elina Kallionidou on May 13, 2022 at Bellator 281. She lost the bout via TKO stoppage due to ground and pound at the end of the second round.

== Mixed martial arts record ==
Professional record breakdown
18 matches	11 wins	6 losses
By knockout	6	3
By submission	1	0
By decision	4	3
Draws	1	

Res.	Record	Opponent	Method	Event	Date	Round	Time	Location	Notes
Loss	11–6–1	Elina Kallionidou	TKO (punches)	Bellator 281	13 May 2022	2	4:53	London, England	
Loss	11–5–1	Denise Kielholtz	KO (punches)	Bellator 247	1 October 2020	1	0:43	Milan, Italy	
Loss	11–4–1	Ilima-Lei Macfarlane	Decision (unanimous)	Bellator 236	21 December 2019	5	5:00	Honolulu, Hawaii, United States	For the Bellator Women's Flyweight World Championship.
Win	11–3–1	Lena Ovchynnikova	TKO (doctor stoppage)	Bellator 223	22 June 2019	1	4:21	London, England	
Win	10–3–1	Anastasia Yankova	Decision (unanimous)	Bellator 200	25 May 2018	3	5:00	London, England	
Loss	9–3–1	Valerie Letourneau	Decision (unanimous)	Bellator 191	15 December 2017	3	5:00	Newcastle, England	
Win	9–2–1	Colleen Schneider	TKO (knee injury)	Bellator 182	25 August 2017	1	5:00	Verona, New York, United States	
Win	8–2–1	Bryony Tyrell	TKO (punches)	British Challenge MMA 18	18 February 2017	3	3:43	Essex, England	Won the CWSE Strawweight Championship. Strawweight bout.
Win	7–2–1	Linn Wennergren	Decision (split)	LFN 13	19 September 2015	3	5:00	Lappeenranta, Finland	
Win	6–2–1	Eeva Siiskonen	Submission (guillotine choke)	LFN 12	25 April 2015	3	4:59	Lappeenranta, Finland	
Win	5–2–1	Paulina Bonkowska	TKO (knees and punches)	Cage Warriors Fighting Championship 72	13 September 2014	1	4:05	Newport, Wales	
Draw	4–2–1	Vuokko Katainen	Draw (split)	LFN 10	17 May 2014	3	5:00	Lappeenranta, Finland	
Loss	4–2	Joanna Jedrzejczyk	TKO (retirement)	PLMMA 17 Extra: Warmia Heroes	18 May 2013	2	5:00	Olsztyn, Poland	
Win	4–1	Chloe Hinchliffe	Decision (unanimous)	Tear Up 9	8 June 2012	3	5:00	Bristol, England	
Win	3–1	Paula Ralph	TKO (punches)	Tear Up 8	17 March 2012	1	0:24	Bristol, England	
Loss	2–1	Hanna Sillen	Decision (unanimous)	The Zone FC 9: Unbreakable	7 May 2011	3	5:00	Gothenburg, Sweden	
Win	2–0	Fay Ridgeway	Decision (unanimous)	Head to Head: The Big Guns	21 November 2010	3	5:00	Somerset, England	
Win	1–0	Kate Rennie	TKO (punches)	HOP 11: Taking Over	30 May 2009	1	0:48	Newport, England	Flyweight debut.

Exhibition record breakdown		
3 matches	2 wins	1 loss
By knockout	1	0
By submission	0	1
By decision	1	0

Res.	Record	Opponent	Method	Event	Date	Round	Time	Location	Notes
Loss	2–1	Tatiana Suarez	Submission (guillotine choke)	The Ultimate Fighter: Team Joanna vs. Team Cláudia	7 July 2016 (airdate)	1	2:52	Las Vegas, Nevada, United States	TUF 23 Semifinal round.
Win	2–0	Ashley Yoder	Decision (unanimous)	The Ultimate Fighter: Team Joanna vs. Team Cláudia	3 May 2016 (airdate)	2	5:00	Las Vegas, Nevada, United States	TUF 23 Quarterfinal round.
Win	1–0	Irene Cabello	TKO (punches)	The Ultimate Fighter: Team Joanna vs. Team Cláudia	20 April 2016 (airdate)	2	4:48	Las Vegas, Nevada, United States	TUF 23 Elimination round.

== See also ==
- List of female mixed martial artists
