= Douglas Dedge =

American mixed martial artist (1966–1998)

- Born: June 18, 1966; Chipley, Florida, US
- Died: March 18, 1998 (aged 31); Kyiv, Ukraine
- Occupation: mixed martial artist

Douglas Dedge (June 18, 1966 – March 18, 1998) was an American mixed martial artist who was the first known American competitor to be fatally injured in an MMA fight and the first death in the modern era of professional MMA.

== Death ==
The fatal bout occurred at the International Super Challenge in Kyiv, Ukraine, on March 16, 1998, against Yevgeni Zolotarev. Dedge attempted a takedown but was mounted and took 14 punches to the head before tapping out. He stood up after the fight but almost immediately collapsed and died two days later from severe brain injuries at the Kiev Institute of Neurosurgery. Friends later said they witnessed Dedge black out during training for the fight.

The limited-rules event was billed as a "Ukraine Against the World" contest and drew about 4,000 spectators. To field the opposition, labeled the "World Team," promoters circulated invitations on the Internet that guaranteed potential competitors travel and accommodation expenses, as well as $2,000 for fighting and an additional $3,000 for winning. Dedge was one of three American fighters on the show.

In the immediate aftermath of Dedge's death, Ultimate Fighting Championship co-founder Art Davie, who had been fired by the organization at the end of 1997, wrote a letter to UFC owner Bob Meyrowitz (also sent to MMA opponent Senator John McCain) asking him to "reconsider" the promotion of MMA in light of the Dedge incident. Davie had just become affiliated with kickboxing promotion K-1 and became vice-president of K-1 USA. Dave Meltzer in the Wrestling Observer Newsletter commented that Davie's motives for writing the letter "can and will be questioned greatly." Meyrowitz, speaking for the UFC, said the death was "an example of why we have been asking for regulation of this sport by athletic commissions in the U.S. as well as internationally."

The German industrial project KiEw used samples from a report about Dedge's death in their song Feierabend in Kiew (closing time in Kiew).

== Personal life ==
Dedge was from Chipley, Florida, and had founded an MMA school in Enterprise, Alabama. He was married and had five children.

== See also ==
- Fatalities in mixed martial arts contests
