= Ian Entwistle =

British mixed martial artist

- Born: 19 November 1986 (age 39); Accrington, England
- Other names: The Locksmith
- Nationality: English
- Height: 5 ft 5 in (1.65 m)
- Weight: 136 lb (62 kg; 9.7 st)
- Division: Featherweight; Bantamweight
- Reach: 64.0 in (163 cm)
- Fighting out of: Accrington, England
- Team: Phuket Top team Australian Top Team; England Top Team
- Rank: Black Belt in Brazilian jiu-jitsu Black belt in karate
- Years active: 2010–2017, 2020–present

Mixed martial arts record
- Total: 14
- Wins: 9
- By knockout: 1
- By submission: 7
- By disqualification: 1
- Losses: 5
- By knockout: 4
- By submission: 1

Other information
- Mixed martial arts record from Sherdog
- Last updated on: 23 June 2015

Ian Entwistle
Medal record

Representing United Kingdom

Brazilian Jiu-Jitsu

World Professional Jiu-Jitsu Cup
Bronze medal – third place	2010 Abu Dhabi, UAE	Open Light

Ian Entwistle (born 19 November 1986) is a British mixed martial artist who formerly competed in the Bantamweight division of the Ultimate Fighting Championship.

== Background ==
Born and raised in Accrington, Lancashire, Entwistle competed in football on various levels as a youngster. Before he began training in martial arts, he briefly owned and operated a nightclub in Accrington.

He is supporter of Accrington Stanley Football club.

== Mixed martial arts career ==
=== Early career ===
After the culmination of his soccer career, Enwistle began training in mixed martial arts in 2008. He made his debut as a professional in 2010, competing as a featherweight for various regional promotions across England, including a stint in Cage Warriors. He was able to compile a record along the way of 8-1, and finished all of his opponents in the first round. After his finish of Liam James in December 2013, Entwistle moved from England to Phuket, Thailand in an attempt to further his career and enhance his Muay Thai skills. He signed with the UFC in May 2014.

=== Ultimate Fighting Championship ===
Entwistle made his promotional debut on 28 June 2014 as he faced Dan Hooker at UFC Fight Night 43. After threatening Hooker with several submission attempts, Entwistle lost the fight via TKO in the first round.

Entwistle faced Anthony Birchak in a bantamweight bout on 13 December 2014 at UFC on Fox 13. Entwistle won the fight via submission in the first round. He was also awarded a Performance of the Night bonus.

Entwistle was expected to face Marcus Brimage on 18 July 2015 at UFC Fight Night 72. However, Entwistle pulled out of the fight in late June for undisclosed reasons and was replaced by Jimmie Rivera.

Entwistle next faced Alejandro Pérez on 10 April 2016 at UFC Fight Night 86. He lost the fight via TKO in the first round.

Entwistle was scheduled to face Rob Font on 8 October 2016 at UFC 204. However on the day prior to the event, Entwistle fell ill during the weight cutting process and the bout was scrapped.

Entwistle was expected to face Brett Johns on 18 March 2017 at UFC Fight Night 107. Entwistle missed weight at the weigh ins coming in at 139lbs, 3lbs over the bantamweight limit of 136lbs. He forfeited 20% of his fight purse to his opponent. The following day, Entwistle's medical clearance was revoked following a trip to the hospital and the bout was canceled. Subsequently he was released from the UFC and retired from the sport.

=== Return from retirement ===
Over four years removed from his previous bout, Entwistle returned from retirement to face Dumar Roa at Brave CF 45 on November 19, 2020. He lost the fight via first-round technical knockout due to a knee injury.

Entwistle was next expected to face Daguir Imavov at Ares FC 2 on 11 December 2021.

Entwistle faced Arthur Demonceaux on May 20, 2022 at Ares FC 6. He lost by the way of TKO stoppage in the first round.

== Championships and accomplishments ==
- Ultimate Fighting Championship
  - UFC.com Awards
    - 2014: Ranked #6 Submission of the Year vs. Anthony Birchak

== Mixed martial arts record ==
Professional record breakdown
14 matches	9 wins	5 losses
By knockout	0	4
By submission	8	1
By disqualification	1	0
Draws	0	

Res.	Record	Opponent	Method	Event	Date	Round	Time	Location	Notes
Loss	9–5	Arthur Demonceaux	TKO (punches)	Ares FC 6	20 May 2022	1	1:21	Paris, France	Return to Featherweight.
Loss	9–4	Dumar Roa	TKO (injury)	Brave CF 45	19 November 2020	1	2:47	Riffa, Bahrain	Catchweight (165 lb) bout.
Loss	9–3	Alejandro Pérez	TKO (punches)	UFC Fight Night: Rothwell vs. dos Santos	10 April 2016	1	4:04	Zagreb, Croatia	
Win	9–2	Anthony Birchak	Submission (heel hook)	UFC on Fox: dos Santos vs. Miocic	13 December 2014	1	1:04	Phoenix, Arizona, United States	Bantamweight debut. Performance of the Night.
Loss	8–2	Dan Hooker	TKO (elbows)	UFC Fight Night: Te-Huna vs. Marquardt	28 June 2014	1	3:34	Auckland, New Zealand	
Win	8–1	Liam James	Submission (heel hook)	CWFC 62	7 December 2013	1	0:24	Newcastle upon Tyne, England	Featherweight debut.
Win	7–1	Will Cairns	Submission (rear-naked choke)	SFF - Fight Ikon 10	20 July 2013	1	1:26	Manchester, England	
Win	6–1	Michael Bowman	Submission (heel hook)	OMMAC 13	3 March 2012	1	1:56	Liverpool, England	Catchweight (158.5 lb) bout; Entwistle missed weight.
Win	5–1	Andy Green	Submission (rear-naked choke)	CC-Cage Conflict 11	29 October 2011	1	0:31	Liverpool, England	
Loss	4–1	Brad Wheeler	Submission (reverse triangle choke)	CWFC 43	9 July 2011	1	3:22	Kentish Town, England	
Win	4–0	Brad Wheeler	DQ (punches to back of head)	CWFC 41	24 April 2011	1	4:00	Kentish Town, England	Catchweight (157 lb) bout.
Win	3–0	Patrick Vickers	Technical Submission (rear-naked choke)	CWFC 40	26 February 2011	1	0:20	Kentish Town, England	
Win	2–0	Sebastien Grandin	Submission (triangle choke)	KUMMA: Kings of the North	4 September 2010	1	1:37	Manchester, England	
Win	1–0	Marius Buzinskas	Submission (rear-naked choke)	Cage Conflict 6	31 July 2010	1	0:56	Accrington, England	Lightweight debut.

== See also ==
- List of current UFC fighters
- List of male mixed martial artists
