= UFC on Fox: Emmett vs. Stephens =

UFC mixed martial arts event in 2018

- The poster for UFC on Fox: Emmett vs. Stephens
- Promotion: Ultimate Fighting Championship
- Date: February 24, 2018
- Venue: Amway Center
- City: Orlando, Florida
- Attendance: 10,124
- Total gate: $1,064,303.50

Event chronology
UFC Fight Night: Cowboy vs. Medeiros	UFC on Fox: Emmett vs. Stephens	UFC 222: Cyborg vs. Kunitskaya

UFC on Fox: Emmett vs. Stephens (also known as UFC on Fox 28) was a mixed martial arts event produced by the Ultimate Fighting Championship held on February 24, 2018, at Amway Center in Orlando, Florida, United States.

== Background ==
The event marked the promotion's third visit to Orlando, and first since UFC on Fox: dos Anjos vs. Cowboy 2 in December 2015.

The event was headlined by a featherweight bout between Josh Emmett and Jeremy Stephens.

Jéssica Andrade and Karolina Kowalkiewicz were expected to face in each other in a bout of former UFC Women's Strawweight Championship challengers. However, on December 27, it was announced that Tecia Torres would be Andrade's opponent instead.

Jake Collier was expected to face promotional newcomer Marcin Prachnio at the event. However, Collier pulled out of the fight in early January citing injury. Prachnio faced Sam Alvey.

Current Invicta FC Bantamweight Champion Yana Kunitskaya was expected to face 2004 Olympic silver medalist in wrestling and former UFC Women's Bantamweight Championship challenger Sara McMann at the event. However, on January 10, it was announced that McMann would face Marion Reneau instead, after Reneau's original opponent former Invicta FC Bantamweight Champion and UFC Women's Featherweight Championship challenger Tonya Evinger pulled out of their scheduled bout a week earlier at UFC Fight Night: Cowboy vs. Medeiros.

Former middleweight interim title challenger (as well as 2000 Olympic silver medalist and former world champion in freestyle wrestling) Yoel Romero was expected to face former WSOF Middleweight and Light Heavyweight Champion David Branch at the event. However, on January 13, it was announced that current UFC Middleweight Champion Robert Whittaker pulled out of his title defense against former Strikeforce and UFC Middleweight Champion Luke Rockhold at UFC 221 due to injury and was replaced by Romero. Due to that change, Branch was rescheduled for a future event.

Ilir Latifi was expected to face former interim UFC Light Heavyweight Championship challenger Ovince Saint Preux at UFC on Fox: Jacaré vs. Brunson 2. However, on January 16, Latifi pulled out due to injury and the bout was scrapped. The pairing was then rescheduled for this event.

Gadzhimurad Antigulov was expected to face Aleksandar Rakić at the event. However, Antigulov pulled out of the fight on February 7, and the bout was scrapped.

On February 21, it was announced that a lightweight bout between Gilbert Burns and Olivier Aubin-Mercier was pulled from the event after the medical team deemed unsafe for Burns to cut the necessary weight for the 156-pound limit.

At the weigh-ins, Alex Perez weighed in at 126.5 pounds, a half pound over the flyweight non-title fight upper limit of 126 pounds. As a result, the bout proceeded at catchweight and Perez was fined 20% of his purse which went to his opponent Eric Shelton.

== Results ==
Main Card (Fox)
Weight class				Method	Round	Time	Notes
Featherweight	Jeremy Stephens	def.	Josh Emmett	KO (elbows)	2	1:35
Women's Strawweight	Jéssica Andrade	def.	Tecia Torres	Decision (unanimous) (29–27, 29–28, 29–28)	3	5:00
Light Heavyweight	Ilir Latifi	def.	Ovince Saint Preux	Technical Submission (standing guillotine choke)	1	3:48
Welterweight	Max Griffin	def.	Mike Perry	Decision (unanimous) (29–27, 29–27, 30–27)	3	5:00
Preliminary Card (Fox)
Bantamweight	Brian Kelleher	def.	Renan Barão	Decision (unanimous) (30–27, 30–27, 29–28)	3	5:00
Women's Bantamweight	Marion Reneau	def.	Sara McMann	Submission (triangle choke)	2	3:40
Women's Strawweight	Angela Hill	def.	Maryna Moroz	Decision (unanimous) (30–27, 30–27, 30–27)	3	5:00
Welterweight	Alan Jouban	def.	Ben Saunders	KO (punch)	2	2:38
Preliminary Card (UFC Fight Pass)
Light Heavyweight	Sam Alvey	def.	Marcin Prachnio	KO (punch)	1	4:23
Bantamweight	Rani Yahya	def.	Russell Doane	Submission (arm-triangle choke)	3	2:32
Catchweight (126.5 lb)	Alex Perez	def.	Eric Shelton	Decision (unanimous) (30–27, 30–27, 30–27)	3	5:00
Bantamweight	Manny Bermudez	def.	Albert Morales	Submission (guillotine choke)	2	2:33

== Bonus awards ==
The following fighters were awarded $50,000 bonuses:

- Fight of the Night: Alan Jouban vs. Ben Saunders
- Performance of the Night: Jeremy Stephens and Ilir Latifi

== Reported payout ==
The following is the reported payout to the fighters as reported to the Florida State Boxing Commission. It does not include sponsor money and also does not include the UFC's traditional "fight night" bonuses. The total disclosed payout for the event was $1,173,000.

- Jeremy Stephens: $126,000 (includes $63,000 win bonus) def. Josh Emmett: $45,000
- Jéssica Andrade: $96,000 (includes $48,000 win bonus) def. Tecia Torres: $36,000
- Ilir Latifi: $66,000 (includes $33,000 win bonus) def. Ovince Saint Preux: $86,000
- Max Griffin: $24,000 (includes $12,000 win bonus) def. Mike Perry: $40,000
- Brian Kelleher: $40,000 (includes $20,000 win bonus) def. Renan Barão: $53,000
- Marion Reneau: $56,000 (includes $28,000 win bonus) def. Sara McMann: $38,000
- Angela Hill: $42,000 (includes $21,000 win bonus) def. Maryna Moroz: $23,000
- Alan Jouban: $80,000 (includes $40,000 win bonus) def. Ben Saunders: $23,000
- Sam Alvey: $92,000 (includes $46,000 win bonus) def. Marcin Prachnio: $25,000
- Rani Yahya: $92,000 (includes $46,000 win bonus) def. Russell Doane: $22,000
- Alex Perez: $21,600 (includes $12,000 win bonus) def. Eric Shelton: $14,400 ^
- Manny Bermudez: $20,000 (includes $15,000 win bonus) def. Albert Morales: $15,000

^ Perez was fined $2,400, 20 percent of his purse for failing to make the required weight for his fight with Eric Shelton.

== See also ==
- List of UFC events
- 2018 in UFC
