= Elina Kallionidou =

Greek female mixed martial artist

- Born: Ελίνα Καλλιονίδου; November 18, 1998 (age 27); Preveza, Greece
- Other names: Gunner
- Nationality: Greek
- Height: 5 ft 5 in (1.65 m)
- Weight: 125 lb (57 kg; 8 st 13 lb)
- Division: Flyweight
- Style: BJJ
- Fighting out of: Preveza, Greece
- Team: Armagos Gym
- Years active: 2014–present

Mixed martial arts record
- Total: 16
- Wins: 10
- By knockout: 5
- By submission: 2
- By decision: 3
- Losses: 6
- By decision: 6

Other information
- Mixed martial arts record from Sherdog

Elina "Gunner" Kallionidou (Greek: Ελίνα Καλλιονίδου; born November 18, 1998) is a Greek female mixed martial artist who competes in the Flyweight division. Elina competed in Bellator MMA, is the Former Cage Survivor Bantamweight Champion and has a Brazilian Jiu-Jitsu blue belt.

== Background ==
She started MMA after being shown wrestling by a teacher and as a form of self-defence at the age of 14, before balancing school and a professional career, making her MMA debut at the age of 16. The athlete of ‘Armagos Gym’, with coaches in her corner Costa and Giorgos Armagos, has brought for Greece the first victory in the promotion.

== Mixed martial arts career ==
=== Bellator MMA ===
Kallionidou made her MMA debut at the age of 16, winning all her first bout and beating much more experienced opponents, winning the CS Women's Bantamweight title in the process.

Making her Bellator debut against Sinead Kavanagh at Bellator 169 on December 16, 2016; she lost the bout by unanimous decision.

In her sophomore performance, she faced Anastasia Yankova on April 8, 2017, at Bellator 176, losing the bout via unanimous decision.

After her two losses in Bellator as a teenager, Kallionidou finished her next two opponents since leaving in 2017, submitting Barbara Nalepka via bulldog choke at Ladies Fight Night 8, and knocking out future UFC fighter Qihui Yan in the third round at WKG & M-1 Challenge 100. These performances led her to resigning with Bellator.

In her return performance, Kallionidou face Bruna Ellen on July 12, 2019, at Bellator 224, losing the bout in which she broke her hand via unanimous decision.

Kallionidou faced Bec Rawlings on 22 February 2020 at Bellator 240, losing the bout via unanimous decision.

After a year and half layoff, Kallionidou made her return against Petra Částková on October 1, 2021, at Bellator 267, submitting her opponent via heel hook in the first round.

Kallionidou faced Kate Jackson on May 13, 2022, at Bellator 281. She won the bout via TKO stoppage due to ground and pound at the end of the second round.

Kallionidou faced Jena Bishop on February 25, 2023, at Bellator 291. She lost the bout by unanimous decision.

=== Post Bellator ===
In her first bout after leaving Bellator, Kallionidou faced Maritza Sanchez on December 9, 2023, at Combate Global: Sanchez vs. Kallionidou, losing the bout via unanimous decision.

== Championships and accomplishments ==
=== Mixed martial arts ===
- CageSurvivor
  - CS Women's Bantamweight Championship (One time)

== Mixed martial arts record ==
Professional record breakdown
16 matches	10 wins	6 losses
By knockout	5	0
By submission	2	0
By decision	3	6

Res.	Record	Opponent	Method	Event	Date	Round	Time	Location	Notes
Win	10–6	Aitana Álvarez	Decision (unanimous)	WOW 26	February 21, 2026	3	5:00	Bilbao, Spain	Return to Bantamweight.
Loss	9–6	Maritza Sanchez	Decision (unanimous)	Combate Global: Sanchez vs. Kallionidou	December 9, 2023	3	5:00	Doral, Florida, United States	
Loss	9–5	Jena Bishop	Decision (unanimous)	Bellator 291	February 25, 2023	3	5:00	Dublin, Ireland	
Win	9–4	Kate Jackson	TKO (punches)	Bellator 281	May 13, 2022	2	4:53	London, United Kingdom	
Win	8–4	Petra Částková	Submission (heel hook)	Bellator 267	October 1, 2021	1	2:07	London, United Kingdom	
Loss	7–4	Bec Rawlings	Decision (unanimous)	Bellator 240	February 22, 2020	3	5:00	Dublin, Ireland	
Loss	7–3	Bruna Ellen	Decision (unanimous)	Bellator 224	July 12, 2019	3	5:00	Thackerville, United States	
Win	7–2	Yan Qihui	TKO (punches)	WKG & M-1 Challenge 100	January 26, 2019	3	0:21	Harbin, China	Catchweight (130 lb) bout.
Win	6–2	Barbara Nalepka	Submission (bulldog choke)	Ladies Fight Night 8	December 16, 2017	2	1:18	Łódź, Poland	Return to Flyweight.
Loss	5–2	Anastasia Yankova	Decision (unanimous)	Bellator 176	April 8, 2017	3	5:00	Turin, Italy	Catchweight (130 lb) bout.
Loss	5–1	Sinead Kavanagh	Decision (unanimous)	Bellator 169	December 16, 2016	3	5:00	Dublin, Ireland	
Win	5–0	Dora Kalpakidou	TKO (retirement)	Cage Survivor 5	June 11, 2016	1	5:00	Athens, Greece	
Win	4–0	Foteini Kromida	Decision (unanimous)	Cage Survivor 4	July 4, 2015	5	5:00	Athens, Greece	Won the Cage Suvivor Women's Bantamweight Tournament.
Win	3–0	Roxane Teixeira	Decision (unanimous)	Cage Survivor 4	July 4, 2015	3	5:00	Athens, Greece	Bantamweight debut. Cage Survivor Women's Bantamweight Tournament Semifinal.
Win	2–0	Gianna Mpounia	TKO (punches)	Cage Survivor 3	January 18, 2015	2	3:17	Athens, Greece	
Win	1–0	Despina Panagiotara	TKO (punches)	European Fight League: The Battle 3	December 28, 2014	1	4:00	Athens, Greece	Flyweight debut.

== See also ==
- List of female mixed martial artists
