= UFC Fight Night: Bader vs. Nogueira 2 =

UFC mixed martial arts event in 2016

- The poster for UFC Fight Night: Bader vs. Nogueira 2
- Promotion: Ultimate Fighting Championship
- Date: November 19, 2016
- Venue: Ginásio do Ibirapuera
- City: São Paulo, Brazil
- Attendance: 9,028

Event chronology
UFC Fight Night: Mousasi vs. Hall 2	UFC Fight Night: Bader vs. Nogueira 2	UFC Fight Night: Whittaker vs. Brunson

UFC Fight Night: Bader vs. Nogueira 2 (also known as UFC Fight Night 100) was a mixed martial arts event produced by the Ultimate Fighting Championship held on November 19, 2016, at Ginásio do Ibirapuera in São Paulo, Brazil

== Background ==
The event was initially expected to be headlined by a light heavyweight bout between former two-time UFC Light Heavyweight Championship challenger Alexander Gustafsson and Antônio Rogério Nogueira The promotion had previously scheduled the pairing as main event on two other occasions. First in April 2012 at UFC on Fuel TV: Gustafsson vs. Silva and again in March 2014 at UFC Fight Night: Gustafsson vs. Manuwa. In both instances Nogueira pulled out due to injury. However on September 30, Gustafsson pulled out of the bout citing an injury of his own. In turn, he was replaced by The Ultimate Fighter: Team Nogueira vs. Team Mir light heavyweight winner Ryan Bader. Bader defeated Nogueira in their previous encounter six years prior at UFC 119 by unanimous decision.

Michael Graves was scheduled to face Sérgio Moraes on the card. However, Graves was removed from the fight on October 3 after he was arrested on a misdemeanor battery charge. He was replaced by Zak Ottow.

Matheus Nicolau was expected to face Ulka Sasaki at the event. However, on November 3, Nicolau was pulled from the bout after USADA revealed a potential anti-doping violation from a sample taken October 13. In turn, Sasaki was pulled from the event entirely and was later rescheduled to face Wilson Reis on February 12, 2017 at UFC 208

== Results ==
Main Card (Fox Sports 1)
Weight class				Method	Round	Time	Notes
Light Heavyweight	Ryan Bader	def.	Antônio Rogério Nogueira	TKO (punches)	3	3:51
Bantamweight	Thomas Almeida	def.	Albert Morales	TKO (punches)	2	1:37
Women's Strawweight	Cláudia Gadelha	def.	Cortney Casey	Decision (unanimous) (30–27, 30–27, 30–27)	3	5:00
Middleweight	Krzysztof Jotko	def.	Thales Leites	Decision (unanimous) (29–27, 30–27, 30–27)	3	5:00
Welterweight	Kamaru Usman	def.	Warlley Alves	Decision (unanimous) (29–27, 30–26, 29–28)	3	5:00
Welterweight	Sérgio Moraes	def.	Zak Ottow	Decision (split) (28–29, 30–27, 30–27)	3	5:00
Preliminary Card (Fox Sports 1)
Middleweight	Cezar Ferreira	def.	Jack Hermansson	Submission (arm-triangle choke)	2	2:11
Light Heavyweight	Gadzhimurad Antigulov	def.	Marcos Rogério de Lima	Submission (guillotine choke)	1	1:07
Bantamweight	Johnny Eduardo	def.	Manny Gamburyan	TKO (punches)	2	0:46
Heavyweight	Luis Henrique	def.	Christian Colombo	Submission (guillotine choke)	3	2:12
Preliminary Card (UFC Fight Pass)
Bantamweight	Pedro Munhoz	def.	Justin Scoggins	Submission (guillotine choke)	2	1:55
Light Heavyweight	Darren Stewart	vs.	Francimar Barroso	No Contest (inadvertent headbutt)	1	1:34	(Note: Original ruled a TKO (punches) victory for Stewart; result overturned to "No Contest" by the Comissão Atlética Brasileira de MMA (CABMMA) due to an inadvertent headbutt.)

== Bonus awards ==
The following fighters were awarded $50,000 bonuses:

- Fight of the Night: Not awarded
- Performance of the Night: Thomas Almeida, Cezar Ferreira, Gadzhimurad Antigulov and Pedro Munhoz

== See also ==
- List of UFC events
- 2016 in UFC
