= Alejandro Pérez (fighter) =

Mexican mixed martial artist

- Born: Alejandro Pérez; September 2, 1989 (age 37); Aguascalientes City, Mexico
- Other names: Turbo; Diablito
- Height: 5 ft 6 in (1.68 m)
- Weight: 135 lb (61 kg)
- Division: Bantamweight
- Reach: 67 in (170 cm)
- Fighting out of: San Jose, California, United States
- Team: American Kickboxing Academy (2014-present); KB-VT Gym (formerly)
- Years active: 2005–present

Mixed martial arts record
- Total: 32
- Wins: 22
- By knockout: 9
- By submission: 6
- By decision: 7
- Losses: 9
- By knockout: 2
- By submission: 3
- By decision: 4
- Draws: 1

Other information
- Mixed martial arts record from Sherdog

Alejandro Pérez (born September 2, 1989) is a Mexican mixed martial artist who competed in the bantamweight division of the Ultimate Fighting Championship (UFC). He was the bantamweight winner of The Ultimate Fighter: Latin America.

== Mixed martial arts career ==
=== Early career ===
Pérez made his professional mixed martial arts debut in 2005 at the age of 16, competing for regional promotions across Mexico. He was able to compile a record of 14–5 before trying out for The Ultimate Fighter in 2014.

=== The Ultimate Fighter: Latin America ===
In May 2014, it was revealed that Pérez was a cast member of The Ultimate Fighter: Latin America, competing for Team Velasquez.

Over the course of the show, Pérez first defeated Fredy Serrano in the quarterfinals via unanimous decision. In the semifinals, Pérez went on to defeat Guido Cannetti via knockout in the first round to reach the finals.

=== Ultimate Fighting Championship ===
Pérez made his official UFC debut on November 15, 2014, at UFC 180, facing fellow castmate, and former opponent José Alberto Quiñónez in the bantamweight finals. Pérez defeated Quiñónez via unanimous decision to become the tournament winner.

For his second fight with the promotion, Pérez faced Patrick Williams on June 13, 2015, at UFC 188. He lost the fight via submission in the first round.

Pérez faced Scott Jorgensen on November 21, 2015, at The Ultimate Fighter Latin America 2 Finale. He won the fight via TKO in the second round after Jorgensen was unable to continue after injuring his ankle.

Pérez faced Ian Entwistle on April 10, 2016, at UFC Fight Night 86. He won the fight via TKO in the first round and also earned a Performance of the Night bonus.

Pérez was expected to face Manny Gamburyan on September 17, 2016, at UFC Fight Night 94. However, Gamburyan pulled out of the fight in mid-August for undisclosed personal reasons and was replaced by Albert Morales. The fight was scored a majority draw.

Pérez was expected to face Rob Font on December 3, 2016, at The Ultimate Fighter 24 Finale. However, Pérez pulled out of the fight on November 24. He was replaced by promotional newcomer Matt Schnell.

Pérez faced Andre Soukhamthath on August 5, 2017, at UFC Fight Night 114. He won the fight by split decision.

Pérez faced Iuri Alcântara on December 9, 2017, at UFC Fight Night 123. He won the fight by unanimous decision.

Pérez faced Matthew Lopez on April 14, 2018, at UFC on Fox 29. He won the fight via TKO in the second round.

Pérez faced Eddie Wineland on July 14, 2018, at UFC Fight Night 133. He was awarded a unanimous decision.

Pérez was expected to face Song Yadong on March 2, 2019, at UFC 235. However, it was reported on January 11, 2019, that he pulled out on January 11 due to undisclosed reasons. He was replaced by Cody Stamann. Pérez lost the fight by unanimous decision. The bout against Yadong Song was rescheduled and eventually took place on July 6, 2019, at UFC 239. Pérez lost the fight via knockout in the first round.

Pérez was expected to face Thomas Almeida on October 11, 2020 at UFC Fight Night 179. However, it was announced on October 2 that Pérez was forced out due to testing positive for COVID-19.

Pérez faced Johnny Eduardo on October 2, 2021, at UFC Fight Night 193. He won the fight via a scarf hold armlock in round two. This win earned him the Performance of the Night award.

Pérez faced Jonathan Martinez on February 26, 2022, at UFC Fight Night 202. He lost the fight via unanimous decision.

In January 2023, it was announced that Perez had been released by the UFC.

== Championships and accomplishments ==
- Ultimate Fighting Championship
  - The Ultimate Fighter: Latin America Tournament Winner
  - Performance of the Night (Two times) vs. Ian Entwistle and Johnny Eduardo

== Mixed martial arts record ==
Professional record breakdown
32 matches	22 wins	9 losses
By knockout	9	2
By submission	6	3
By decision	7	4
Draws	1	

Res.	Record	Opponent	Method	Event	Date	Round	Time	Location	Notes
Loss	22–9–1	Jonathan Martinez	Decision (unanimous)	UFC Fight Night: Makhachev vs. Green	February 26, 2022	3	5:00	Las Vegas, Nevada, United States	Featherweight bout.
Win	22–8–1	Johnny Eduardo	Submission (scarf hold armlock)	UFC Fight Night: Santos vs. Walker	October 2, 2021	2	4:13	Las Vegas, Nevada, United States	Performance of the Night.
Loss	21–8–1	Song Yadong	KO (punch)	UFC 239	July 6, 2019	1	2:04	Las Vegas, Nevada, United States	
Loss	21–7–1	Cody Stamann	Decision (unanimous)	UFC 235	March 2, 2019	3	5:00	Las Vegas, Nevada, United States	
Win	21–6–1	Eddie Wineland	Decision (unanimous)	UFC Fight Night: dos Santos vs. Ivanov	July 14, 2018	3	5:00	Boise, Idaho, United States	
Win	20–6–1	Matthew Lopez	TKO (knees and punches)	UFC on Fox: Poirier vs. Gaethje	April 14, 2018	2	3:42	Glendale, Arizona, United States	
Win	19–6–1	Iuri Alcântara	Decision (unanimous)	UFC Fight Night: Swanson vs. Ortega	December 9, 2017	3	5:00	Fresno, California, United States	
Win	18–6–1	Andre Soukhamthath	Decision (split)	UFC Fight Night: Pettis vs. Moreno	August 5, 2017	3	5:00	Mexico City, Mexico	
Draw	17–6–1	Albert Morales	Draw (majority)	UFC Fight Night: Poirier vs. Johnson	September 17, 2016	3	5:00	Hidalgo, Texas, United States	Pérez was deducted 1 point due to hitting Morales after the end of round 2.
Win	17–6	Ian Entwistle	TKO (punches)	UFC Fight Night: Rothwell vs. dos Santos	April 10, 2016	1	4:04	Zagreb, Croatia	Performance of the Night.
Win	16–6	Scott Jorgensen	TKO (ankle injury)	The Ultimate Fighter Latin America 2 Finale: Magny vs. Gastelum	November 21, 2015	2	4:26	Monterrey, Mexico	
Loss	15–6	Patrick Williams	Technical Submission (guillotine choke)	UFC 188	June 13, 2015	1	0:23	Mexico City, Mexico	
Win	15–5	José Alberto Quiñónez	Decision (unanimous)	UFC 180	November 15, 2014	3	5:00	Mexico City, Mexico	Won The Ultimate Fighter: Latin America Bantamweight Tournament. Quiñónez was docked two points in round 3 due to a headbutt.
Win	14–5	Wanderson Marinho	Submission (rear-naked choke)	Jungle Fight 59	October 12, 2013	2	1:15	Rio de Janeiro, Brazil	
Loss	13–5	José Alberto Quiñónez	Decision (unanimous)	Fight Club Mexico 3	August 2, 2013	3	5:00	Aguascalientes, Mexico	
Win	13–4	Carlo Medina	TKO (punches)	Kamikaze Fight League 2	May 29, 2013	1	1:49	Puerto Vallarta, Mexico	
Win	12–4	Masio Fullen	Decision (unanimous)	Xtreme Combat 14	June 23, 2012	3	5:00	Mexico City, Mexico	
Win	11–4	Fabian Galvan	Decision (unanimous)	The Supreme Cage 1	March 10, 2012	3	5:00	Monterrey, Mexico	
Loss	10–4	Masio Fullen	TKO (punches)	Total Fight Championship	May 28, 2011	1	4:00	Guadalajara, Mexico	
Win	10–3	Gilberto Aguilar	Decision (unanimous)	Supreme Combat Challenge 4	November 12, 2010	3	5:00	Guadalajara, Mexico	
Win	9–3	Rodolfo Rubio Pérez	TKO (punches)	Total Combat 33	July 11, 2009	2	0:51	Mexico City, Mexico	
Win	8–3	Jorge Pineda	TKO (punches)	Black FC 5	March 19, 2009	2	0:45	Zapopan, Mexico	
Win	7–3	Victor Jauregui	TKO (punches)	MMA Xtreme 22	August 16, 2008	1	N/A	Mexico City, Mexico	
Win	6–3	Gaston Pérez	Submission (rear-naked choke)	Black FC 3	May 15, 2008	1	1:06	Zapopan, Mexico	
Loss	5–3	Kevin Dunsmoor	Submission (armbar)	MMA Xtreme 21	April 19, 2008	2	1:27	Mexico City, Mexico	
Win	5–2	Carlos de Luna	Submission (triangle choke)	MMA Xtreme 19	February 2, 2008	1	1:49	Cancun, Mexico	
Loss	4–2	Ivan Lopez	Decision (unanimous)	MMA Xtreme 18	January 26, 2008	3	5:00	Tijuana, Mexico	
Win	4–1	Jorge Pineda	TKO (punches)	Black FC 2	November 1, 2007	1	1:44	Zapopan, Mexico	
Loss	3–1	Chris David	Submission (armbar)	MMA Xtreme 11	April 21, 2007	2	0:36	Mexico City, Mexico	
Win	3–0	Roberto Esparaza	KO (punches)	MMA Xtreme 2	April 23, 2006	1	N/A	Mexico City, Mexico	
Win	2–0	Marcello Porto	Submission (guillotine choke)	Espartan Fighting 7	September 30, 2005	1	N/A	Monterrey, Mexico	
Win	1–0	Mario Rivera	Submission (rear-naked choke)	Gladiator Challenge 39	June 17, 2005	1	2:11	Porterville, California, United States	

== See also ==
- List of male mixed martial artists
- List of Mexican UFC fighters
