= Fatalities in mixed martial arts contests =

Recorded deaths in professional mixed martial arts

As of 2026, there have been twenty recorded deaths resulting from sanctioned mixed martial arts contests and nine from unregulated bouts. A 2006 study suggests that the risk of injury in general in MMA is comparable to that in professional boxing. For professional boxing matches, the Manuel Velazquez Boxing Fatality Collection lists 923 deaths during the 118-year period of 1890–2008.

== List of fatalities ==
=== In sanctioned fights ===
==== Sam Vasquez ====
35-year-old Sam Vasquez collapsed after taking a punch to the chin during a fight on October 20, 2007, in the third round against Vince Libardi at the Renegades Extreme Fighting contest in Houston, Texas. After losing consciousness and experiencing what appeared to be a seizure, he was taken to Saint Joseph Medical Center Critical Care Unit. He was diagnosed with a subdural hemorrhage, for which a section of the skull was removed to relieve pressure. Additional swelling led to the placement of a tube to allow cerebral spinal fluid to be drained out of the cavities in the brain to make room for more swelling, as well as to allow the monitoring of pressure in the brain. He slipped into a coma for 48 hours until his death on November 30.

Vasquez's death was officially ruled as a death due to complications of blunt trauma of the head with a subdural hemorrhage. Vasquez was the first fighter to die from injuries sustained in sanctioned mixed martial arts competition in North America.

==== Michael Kirkham ====
30-year-old Michael Kirkham competed at Dash Entertainment/King MMA "Confrontation at the Convocation Center" at the Aiken Convocation Center in Aiken, South Carolina, on June 26, 2010. His opponent Carlos Iraburo had Kirkham on the canvas seconds into his pro debut; Iraburo then landed a few strikes to the head of his grounded opponent leading to a referee stoppage 41 seconds into the match. Kirkham soon lost consciousness and never recovered. He was pronounced dead two days after the fight. An autopsy report listed the cause of death as "subarachnoid hemorrhage of the brain". Kirkham had been TKO'd in his final amateur bout on April 24, 2010, leading Dr. Joe Estwanik, the former medical advisor to the North Carolina Boxing Authority, to speculate: "This could have been second-impact syndrome." Typically, to avoid such impact, combat sporting authorities have the right to suspend a contestant longer than the normal 45 days (with 30 days of no contact) for a knockout after tests. Kirkham's MMA match occurred 63 days after his final amateur match. The event occurred in June 2010, when South Carolina MMA rules were still in their infancy after Act 53 became law without Governor Mark Sanford's signature on June 3, 2009. There was only a 30-day rule for knockouts in effect.

Following Kirkham's death, the South Carolina Athletic Commission revised combat sport rules to change the suspension period to 60 days for knockouts and 30 days for technical knockouts. That took effect in 2012.

==== Tyrone Mims ====
30-year-old Tyrone Mims was competing in an amateur mixed martial arts show on August 11, 2012, at Conflict MMA Fight Night at the Point IV in Mount Pleasant, South Carolina. Tyrone became weak and tired in the second round and the referee stopped the bout because he was unable to continue. The referee and cage-side physician both checked on him and he responded to them that he was fine, just tired. Shortly after being helped back to the locker room by teammates, Tyrone lost consciousness. EMS attempted to revive him at the scene and transported him to the Medical University of South Carolina (MUSC) hospital where he was pronounced dead at 9:27 p.m. The Charleston County Coroner performed a "gross autopsy", which looks at visible injuries, and failed to reach a cause of death. The final autopsy results were also inconclusive, no evidence of a concussion or brain trauma was detected, and the toxicology report did not reveal the presence of drugs or alcohol. Coroner Rae Wooten speculated that Mims "might have had an irregular heart because of some electrical dysfunction" stating: "That obviously isn't seen after death. Once that's completed, there's no evidence of that." And concluding: "There's just nothing here that explains his death."

==== Booto Guylain ====
29-year-old Booto Guylain, a Congolese fighter, experienced a head injury during the third round of his MMA bout against Keron Davies at EFC AFRICA 27 held in Johannesburg, South Africa, on February 27, 2014. He was stabilized on-site and taken to the hospital. He died a week later on March 5, 2014, as a result of complications related to the swelling of the brain.

==== Donshay White ====
37-year-old Donshay White of Radcliff, Kentucky lost a sanctioned amateur heavyweight bout against Ricky Muse in Louisville, Kentucky by TKO in the second round at an event titled "Hardrock MMA 90" on July 16, 2017. It was his first bout since 2015. After the fight, he collapsed backstage and was taken to an ambulance where he died. He arrived at Saints Mary and Elizabeth Hospital with no pulse and was pronounced dead at 9:02 p.m. The cause of his death was ruled as hypertensive heart disease. The autopsy revealed that White had high blood pressure but was not taking medication for it. Despite this, White passed a physical on the day of the fight.

==== Rondel Clark ====
26-year-old Rondel Clark, a Sutton, Massachusetts, native, lost his second amateur match at the Plymouth Memorial Hall in Plymouth, Massachusetts. Clark, competing at welterweight, entered the bout with a (1–0) amateur record and faced (0-2) amateur Ryan Dunn at an event titled "Cage Titans XXXV", which took place on August 12, 2017. The match was halted approximately two minutes into the third round when Clark appeared too fatigued to intelligently defend himself and the match was ruled a TKO victory for Dunn. Clark reportedly had difficulty breathing and following a post-fight medical examination was carried out on a stretcher and transported to Beth Israel Deaconess Hospital – Plymouth. He was then transferred to Beth Israel Deaconess Medical Center in Boston, Massachusetts where he died on August 15, 2017. Rondel reportedly took very little damage in his losing effort; however, his kidneys began to fail at the hospital. It was later determined that the kidney failure was due to severe dehydration which led to his entire system shutting down. Rondel had the sickle cell trait, which likely accelerated his deterioration. The autopsy officially concluded he died from extreme rhabdomyolysis, which is the rapid breakdown of muscle tissue caused by physical overexertion combined with dehydration. In 2018, the Association of Boxing Commissions, the group that oversees athletic commissions in North America, donated $5,000 to the Rondel Clark Foundation which was set up to raise awareness about extreme weight cutting and severe dehydration.

==== Mateus Fernandes ====
22-year-old Mateus Fernandes died hours after an amateur match in Manaus, Brazil. He faced Obed Pereira on March 30, 2019, in a bantamweight bout at Remulus Fight which was sanctioned by the Amazonas Athletic Commission (CAMMA). After winning the first two rounds, he was dropped to the canvas by a combination of punches and the referee halted the contest. Fernandes then reportedly had seizures and was transported to Raimundo Accident and Emergency for treatment. While at the hospital, he reportedly suffered four heart attacks, dying at 11:45 p.m. local time. Fernandes was part of a program that helped people deal with drug addiction through martial arts and it has been alleged that after undergoing exams the fighter spent the night before the fight taking drugs. Fernandes passed his pre-fight blood exams, but did not have his heart or brain checked prior to the contest.

==== Justin Thornton ====
38-year old Justin Thornton was knocked out 19 seconds into the first of five two-minute rounds at Bare Knuckle Fighting Championship’s BKFC 20 match in Biloxi, Mississippi on August 20, 2021, in a heavyweight contest against Dillon Cleckler at the Mississippi Coast Coliseum. The contest was governed as a mixed martial arts match legally because of Mississippi state rules. Thornton was partially paralysed and died on October 4.

==== Christian Lubenga ====
25-year-old Christian Lubenga died following his amateur MMA debut against Cody McCracken. The match was called in Round 3 by TKO at AMMO Fight League 10 in West Springfield, Massachusetts on March 12, 2022. Following the match, Lubenga went unconscious and was later transported by emergency medical transport to a nearby emergency room. He died two days later on March 14th, 2022. His death was due to blunt force trauma to the head according to the Massachusetts Executive Office of Public Safety and Security.

=== In unsanctioned fights ===
==== Alfredo Castro Herrera ====
15-year-old Alfredo Castro Herrera died on April 14, 1981, following an unsanctioned "mixed martial arts" match described in the St. Louis Globe-Democrat as "boxing mixed with karate and judo" (April 15, 1981 issue) in Tijuana, Mexico, where he was knocked out. Herrera's opponent was Angel Luis Rodrigues.

==== Douglas Dedge ====
31-year-old Douglas Dedge was an American mixed martial artist who was the first known American competitor to be fatally injured in an MMA fight and the first death in the modern era of MMA. On March 16, 1998, Dedge competed at an unsanctioned "World Super Challenge" event in Kyiv, Ukraine. After tapping out following multiple strikes to his head, Dedge stood and almost immediately collapsed back to the mat. Dedge was then taken to the Kyiv Institute of Surgery where he died two days later on March 18 of what the chief emergency room doctor termed "severe brain injuries".

Dedge was reported to have passed out during a training session leading up to the bout and it is now widely believed (though never officially confirmed) that Dedge had a preexisting medical condition.

==== Mike Mittelmeier ====
20-year-old Mike Mittelmeier died April 27, 2012, following an unsanctioned April 21 event in Bolivia. After taking down his opponent and applying a leg lock, his opponent illegally kicked him in the head with the heel of his foot, knocking him out. The fight was stopped and Mittelmeier was pronounced the winner by disqualification. A few seconds later, he collapsed (later being diagnosed with a cerebral hemorrhage that left him comatose). It is alleged that the promoters did not have a doctor or ambulance standing by and it took a long time before he was transferred to a hospital.

==== Dustin Jenson ====
26-year-old Dustin Jenson died May 24, 2012, at Rapid City Regional Hospital in South Dakota, following an unsanctioned "RingWars" event on May 18 at Rushmore Plaza Civic Center in Rapid City where he tapped out. Jenson then watched the next two fights before going to the locker room, where he had a seizure. The autopsy listed the cause of death as subdural hemorrhage resulting from blunt force trauma to the head, that was related to an injury suffered approximately a week prior. The injury should have been detected in pre-contest examinations, and had it been a legal sanctioned contest, a South Dakota Athletic Commission official would have called off the contest in accordance to regulations on examinations with the Association of Boxing Commissions.

Although the timeline for the injury is consistent with the event on May 18, 2012, there is no conclusive evidence that the injury was sustained in the fight.

==== Felix Pablo Elochukwu ====
35-year-old Nigerian-born Pablo Elochukwu, an Ontario resident, died after competing in his first amateur mixed martial arts bout in the Amateur Fighting Club in Port Huron, Michigan, on April 7, 2013. According to reports, neither he nor his opponent was required to undergo pre-fight medicals for their bout. Sometime in the third round, Elochukwu was mounted and was not properly defending himself causing the referee to halt the bout. Elochukwu appeared to be fine during the announcement of the final decision and walked away on his own accord but on the way to the dressing room, he stopped and sat down citing exhaustion. Those around Elochukwu noticed something was wrong and offered him some orange juice, believing his blood sugar may have dropped significantly (he was said to be hypoglycaemic). Moments after being helped onto a chair, he fell from it. A certified first responder in the crowd noticed Elochukwu's distress as Elochukwu was being helped to a seat, he was in and out of consciousness as Ryan Puzan, the first responder from the crowd, reached him. Puzan was told by event staff that paramedics had been called and were on their way; he, however, doubted that, as EMS did not show up until forty minutes later according to Puzan. Elochukwu stopped showing any vital signs a few minutes after floating in and out of consciousness, Puzan and an RN from the crowd then performed CPR and breathing treatments on Elochukwu until the arrival of paramedics. The ambulance was dispatched at 9:31 p.m. Elochukwu was treated and pronounced dead at 10:12 p.m. at Port Huron Hospital.

There were said to be no hired medics or doctors at the venue at the time Elochukwu's collapse. According to Ryan Puzan: "if Felix had access to a defibrillator there, he could be walking and talking today."

Michigan was among about a dozen U.S. states in which amateur mixed martial arts bouts are legal, but unregulated. The death of Elochukwu prompted the Michigan legislator to quickly regulate amateur mixed martial arts. State Representative Harvey Santana commenting on the legislation stated: "The unfortunate events that happened over the weekend kind of catapulted it faster".

UFC (the largest MMA promotion company in the world) executive Tom Wright, who heads up the organizations efforts in Canada, fielded questions about Elochukwu's death on April 10 at UFC 161 press conference in Winnipeg. Saying

"What we don't know is whether or not there were any pre-existing medical conditions that Pablo was suffering from, and in a regulated environment, we would have known that," he said. "We also don't know if the referees were properly trained. We don't know whether or not there were the appropriate EMTs and ambulances and medical precautions in place. We don't even know if it was a fair fight as far as if the competitors were evenly balanced." "Those are kinds of things we would know if the sport had been regulated, if the event had been regulated," he continued. "It speaks to the importance of regulation in our sport, why it's important that we have the appropriate kind of rigor and standards, from medical care to pre- and post-fight medical testing to drug testing to insuring the health and safety of these athletes is always first and foremost. And in the case of an unregulated event, you don't know whether those things are in place, which is why we as an organization have always run to regulation."

==== Ramin Zeynalov ====
27-year-old Azerbaijani Ramin Zeynalov died in March 2015 while competing in an amateur MMA bout in Azerbaijan. A takedown by the rival KO'd Zeynalov caused his head to hit the canvas with medical personnel unable to revive him. The cause of death was later deemed a brain hemorrhage.

==== Jameston Lee-Yaw ====
47-year-old Trinidad-born Jameston Lee-Yaw died in April 2015 while competing in an amateur MMA bout at the SouthShore Mall in Aberdeen, Washington. The death was attributed to kidney failure. Lee-Yaw collapsed in the ring and was carried to a dressing room where it was discovered he was having trouble breathing. Lee-Yaw was initially taken to Grays Harbor Community Hospital and then transferred to Harborview Medical Center in Seattle, Washington, where he died. Twin Dragons Center Mixed Martial Arts, which has training facilities at the mall, billed the event as Brawl at the Mall. In Washington state, amateur bouts that take place at a gym are not required to have medical staff on hand and leave the training facility and its staff responsible for the health and safety of participants. It is unknown what caused the kidney failure. Furthermore, Lee-Yaw's age (47) would by law disqualify him from participation as a fighter in many states, which have age limits similar to those in boxing.

==== João Carvalho ====
28-year-old João Carvalho, a Portuguese fighter, died 48 hours after his bout with Charlie Ward. The match took place at Total Extreme Fighting 1, on April 11, 2016. The event was held at Dublin, Ireland's National Stadium. Following Carvalho's death, Ireland's Minister of State Tourism and Sport Michael Ring issued a pledge to regulate mixed martial arts in Ireland. At the time of Carvalho's death, there was no governing body for professional MMA in Ireland but the Irish Amateur Pankration Association (IAPA) oversaw the sport at the amateur level.

== See also ==
- Dementia pugilistica
