= UFC Fight Night: Rothwell vs. dos Santos =

UFC mixed martial arts event in 2016

- The poster for UFC Fight Night: Rothwell vs. dos Santos
- Promotion: Ultimate Fighting Championship
- Date: April 10, 2016
- Venue: Arena Zagreb
- City: Zagreb, Croatia
- Attendance: 13,177
- Total gate: $549,000

Event chronology
UFC Fight Night: Hunt vs. Mir	UFC Fight Night: Rothwell vs. dos Santos	UFC on Fox: Teixeira vs. Evans

UFC Fight Night: Rothwell vs. dos Santos (also known as UFC Fight Night 86) was a mixed martial arts event held on April 10, 2016, at the Arena Zagreb in Zagreb, Croatia.

== Background ==
The event was the first that the organization has hosted in Croatia.

A heavyweight bout between Ben Rothwell and former UFC Heavyweight Champion Junior dos Santos served as the event headliner.

Bartosz Fabiński was expected to face Nicolas Dalby at the event. However, on March 2, Fabiński was removed from the card due to undisclosed reasons and was replaced by Zak Cummings.

Ruslan Magomedov was expected to face former heavyweight title challenger Gabriel Gonzaga at the event, but pulled out on March 9 due to a knee injury. Gonzaga faced Derrick Lewis instead.

Promotional newcomer Bojan Mihajlović was expected to face Francis Ngannou at the event. However, Mihajlović was removed from the card on March 14 due to undisclosed reasons and was replaced by fellow promotional newcomer Curtis Blaydes.

== Results ==
Main Card (Fox Sports 1)
Weight class				Method	Round	Time	Notes
Heavyweight	Junior dos Santos	def.	Ben Rothwell	Decision (unanimous) (50–45, 50–45, 50–45)	5	5:00
Heavyweight	Derrick Lewis	def.	Gabriel Gonzaga	KO (punches)	1	4:48
Heavyweight	Francis Ngannou	def.	Curtis Blaydes	TKO (doctor stoppage)	2	5:00
Heavyweight	Timothy Johnson	def.	Marcin Tybura	Decision (unanimous) (29–28, 29–28, 29–28)	3	5:00
Light Heavyweight	Jan Błachowicz	def.	Igor Pokrajac	Decision (unanimous) (29–28, 29–28, 29–28)	3	5:00
Women's Strawweight	Maryna Moroz	def.	Cristina Stanciu	Decision (unanimous) (30–27, 30–27, 30–27)	3	5:00
Preliminary Card (Fox Sports 1)
Welterweight	Zak Cummings	def.	Nicolas Dalby	Decision (unanimous) (30–27, 30–27, 30–27)	3	5:00
Bantamweight	Alejandro Pérez	def.	Ian Entwistle	Verbal Submission (strikes)	1	4:04
Lightweight	Mairbek Taisumov	def.	Damir Hadžović	TKO (punch)	1	3:44
Bantamweight	Damian Stasiak	def.	Filip Pejić	Submission (rear-naked choke)	1	2:16
Preliminary Card (UFC Fight Pass)
Featherweight	Lucas Martins	def.	Robert Whiteford	Decision (split) (29–28, 28–29, 30–27)	3	5:00
Heavyweight	Jared Cannonier	def.	Cyril Asker	KO (punches and elbows)	1	2:44
Middleweight	Bojan Veličković	def.	Alessio Di Chirico	Decision (unanimous) (29–28, 29–28, 30–27)	3	5:00

== Bonus awards ==
The following fighters were awarded $50,000 bonuses:

- Fight of the Night: None awarded
- Performance of the Night: Derrick Lewis, Alejandro Pérez, Mairbek Taisumov and Jared Cannonier

== See also ==
- List of UFC events
- 2016 in UFC
