= Rob Whiteford =

Scottish mixed martial arts fighter

- Born: Robert Whiteford; April 12, 1983 (age 43); Fauldhouse, West Lothian, Scotland
- Other names: The Hammer
- Nationality: Scottish
- Height: 5 ft 9 in (1.75 m)
- Weight: 145.7 lb (66.1 kg; 10.41 st)
- Division: Featherweight
- Reach: 69.0 in (175 cm)
- Stance: Orthodox
- Fighting out of: Fauldhouse, West Lothian, Scotland
- Team: American Top Team, Dinky Ninjas
- Rank: Black belt in Judo
- Years active: 2009–present

Mixed martial arts record
- Total: 23
- Wins: 17
- By knockout: 7
- By submission: 3
- By decision: 7
- Losses: 5
- By knockout: 2
- By submission: 1
- By decision: 2
- No contests: 1

Other information
- Website: http://www.robertwhiteford.com/
- Mixed martial arts record from Sherdog

Robert Whiteford (born 12 April 1983) is a Scottish mixed martial artist competing in Featherweight division. A professional competitor since 2009, he formerly competed for the UFC, being the first Scottish fighter to be signed by the promotion, Bellator MMA, and Absolute Championship Berkut.

== Career ==
Whiteford has a strong background in judo and Muay Thai, he first began fighting for team "Hostile Territory" based out of "The Dojo" gym in Alloa. He then joined the Dinky Ninja Fight Team (DNFT) The Griphouse Gym, in Glasgow where he has remained a member of the team since. He now lives and trains in South Florida at American Top Team. He has also spent time training with "Sweden All Stars" in Stockholm.

Whiteford made his professional debut in 2009 competing primarily for regional promotions across the United Kingdom where he was able to compile a record of 10 - 1 before signing with the UFC in the fall of 2013.

Whiteford was also a bronze medalist at the 2006 Commonwealth Judo Championships in 2006 in the category of senior male under 73 kg.

=== Ultimate Fighting Championship ===
Whiteford made his promotional debut on 26 October 2013, as a short notice replacement for an injured Mike Wilkinson and faced Jimy Hettes at UFC Fight Night 30. Hettes defeated Whiteford via submission (triangle choke) in the second round.

Whiteford faced Daniel Pineda on 15 March 2014 at UFC 171. Whiteford defeated Pineda via unanimous decision.

Whiteford was expected to face Dennis Siver on 4 October 2014 at UFC Fight Night 53. However, Whiteford was forced out of the bout in mid-September with an injury and replaced by Charles Rosa.

Whiteford faced Paul Redmond on 18 July 2015 at UFC Fight Night 72. He won the fight via knockout in the first round.

Whiteford faced Darren Elkins on 24 October 2015 at UFC Fight Night 76. He lost the fight by unanimous decision.

Whiteford faced Lucas Martins on 10 April 2016 at UFC Fight Night 86. Whiteford lost the fight via split decision and was subsequently released from the promotion.

=== Bellator MMA ===
After three straight wins in Absolute Championship Berkut, Whiteford signed with Bellator. He made his promotional debut against Sam Sicilia at Bellator London 2 on November 23, 2019. Despite being knocked down multiple times during the bout, Whiteford came back and knocked Sicilia out with only six seconds left in the final round.

Whiteford faced Andrew Fisher on October 1, 2021 at Bellator 267. After being eye poked three times, Whiteford was unable to continue and the bout was called a no contest.

Whiteford faced Daniel Weichel on May 13, 2022 at Bellator 281. He lost the bout via TKO stoppage in the first round.

After a 2 year layoff, Whiteford faced fellow UFC veteran Roger Huerta in the co-main event of PFL Europe 3 on September 28, 2024. He would win the fight via unanimous decision.

== Mixed martial arts record ==
Professional record breakdown
23 matches	17 wins	5 losses
By knockout	7	2
By submission	3	1
By decision	7	2
No contests	1	

Res.	Record	Opponent	Method	Event	Date	Round	Time	Location	Notes
Win	17–5 (1)	Roger Huerta	Decision (unanimous)	PFL Europe 3 (2024)	September 28, 2024	3	5:00	Glasgow, Scotland	Catchweight (150 lb) bout.
Loss	16–5 (1)	Daniel Weichel	TKO (punches)	Bellator 281	May 13, 2022	1	1:12	London, England	
NC	16–4 (1)	Andrew Fisher	NC (accidental eye poke)	Bellator 267	October 1, 2021	2	2:50	London, England	Accidental eye poke rendered Whiteford unable to continue.
Win	16–4	Sam Sicilia	KO (punches)	Bellator London 2	November 23, 2019	3	4:54	London, England	
Win	15–4	Kane Mousah	Decision (split)	ACB 87	May 19, 2018	3	5:00	Nottingham, England	
Win	14–4	Nam Phan	Technical Submission (guillotine choke)	ACB 54	March 11, 2017	1	0:29	Manchester, England	
Win	13–4	Kevin Petshi	Decision (unanimous)	ACB 47	1 October 2016	3	5:00	Glasgow, Scotland	Catchweight (141 lb) bout.
Loss	12–4	Lucas Martins	Decision (split)	UFC Fight Night: Rothwell vs. dos Santos	10 April 2016	3	5:00	Zagreb, Croatia	
Loss	12–3	Darren Elkins	Decision (unanimous)	UFC Fight Night: Holohan vs. Smolka	24 October 2015	3	5:00	Dublin, Ireland	
Win	12–2	Paul Redmond	KO (punches)	UFC Fight Night: Bisping vs. Leites	18 July 2015	1	3:04	Glasgow, Scotland	
Win	11–2	Daniel Pineda	Decision (unanimous)	UFC 171	15 March 2014	3	5:00	Dallas, Texas, United States	
Loss	10–2	Jimy Hettes	Technical Submission (triangle choke)	UFC Fight Night: Machida vs. Munoz	26 October 2013	2	2:17	Manchester, England	
Win	10–1	Paul Reed	Decision (unanimous)	Scottish Fight Challenge 6	30 June 2013	3	5:00	Stirling, Scotland	
Win	9–1	Martin Svensson	TKO (punches)	Vision FC 4	12 September 2012	1	0:43	Glasgow, Scotland	Won the Vision Featherweight Championship.
Win	8–1	Carl Fawcett	Decision (majority)	Supremacy Fight Challenge 6	20 May 2012	3	5:00	Gateshead, England	
Win	7–1	Antanas Jazbutis	Decision (unanimous)	Vision FC 3	28 April 2012	3	5:00	Glasgow, Scotland	
Win	6–1	Jonny Goodall	TKO (punches)	Headhunters MMA 2	2 October 2011	1	0:15	Edinburgh, Scotland	
Win	5–1	Liam James	Decision (unanimous)	Supremacy Fight Challenge 2	29 May 2011	3	5:00	Gateshead, England	
Win	4–1	David Galbraith	KO (punches)	On Top 1	2 February 2011	2	1:22	Glasgow, Scotland	
Win	3–1	Chris Batty	TKO (submission to punches)	Absolute Combat 3	1 May 2010	1	N/A	Edinburgh, Scotland	
Win	2–1	Rich Edgeworth	TKO (punches)	Hostile Territory Fight Night 5	10 April 2010	1	N/A	Alloa, Scotland	
Win	1–1	Alan Duffy	TKO (punches)	Absolute Combat 2	28 November 2009	1	2:39	Edinburgh, Scotland	
Loss	0–1	Bobby McVitie	TKO (doctor stoppage)	Absolute Combat 1	23 May 2009	1	5:00	Edinburgh, Scotland	
