= Manny Bermudez =

American MMA fighter

- Born: July 19, 1994 (age 32); Boston, Massachusetts, U.S.
- Other names: The Bermudez Triangle
- Nationality: American
- Height: 5 ft 10 in (1.78 m)
- Weight: 158.8 lb (72 kg; 11 st 5 lb)
- Division: Bantamweight; Featherweight; Lightweight
- Reach: 71.5 in (182 cm)
- Fighting out of: Abington, Massachusetts, U.S.
- Team: South Shore Sportfighting
- Rank: Purple belt in Brazilian Jiu-Jitsu
- Years active: 2015–present

Mixed martial arts record
- Total: 17
- Wins: 15
- By knockout: 1
- By submission: 12
- By decision: 2
- Losses: 2
- By submission: 1
- By decision: 1

Other information
- University: Bridgewater State University
- Mixed martial arts record from Sherdog

Manny Bermudez (born July 19, 1994) is an American mixed martial artist who competed in the bantamweight and featherweight divisions. A professional mixed martial artist since 2015, Bermudez has also competed in the Ultimate Fighting Championship.

== Background ==
Bermudez was born in Boston, Massachusetts, United States Bermudez started training Brazilian jiu-jitsu at the age of thirteen and competed his first amateur fight five year later.

== Mixed martial arts career ==
=== Early career ===
Bermudez fought all his fights under Cage Titans & Classic Entertainment and Sports (CES) since 2015 and amassed a record of 11-0 prior signed by UFC.

=== Ultimate Fighting Championship ===
Bermudez made his UFC debut on February 24, 2018, at UFC on Fox: Emmett vs. Stephens against Albert Morales. He won the fight by a guillotine choke in round two.

Bermudez was scheduled to face Davey Grant on 27 May 2018 at UFC Fight Night 130. However, Grant pulled out of the fight after being diagnosed with a staph infection, and the bout was scrapped. The pairing was left intact and took place on 22 July 2018 at UFC Fight Night 134. He won the fight via a triangle choke.

Bermudez was scheduled to face Benito Lopez on January 26, 2019, at UFC 233. As a result of the cancellation of UFC 233, the pair was rescheduled to UFC on ESPN: Ngannou vs. Velasquez on February 17, 2019. At the weigh-ins, Bermudez weighed in at 140 pounds, 4 pounds over the bantamweight non-title fight upper limit of 136 pounds. As a result, the bout proceeded at catchweight and Bermudez was fined 30% of his purse which went to his opponent Lopez. He won the fight via a submission in round one.

After the Lopez fight, Bermudez signed a new, four-fight contract with the UFC.

A bantamweight bout between Bermudez and Casey Kenney was originally scheduled to on August 17, 2019, at UFC 241. However, the UFC decided to move the bout to a catchweight bout of 140 lbs. due to the fighters cutting substantial weight the night before weigh-ins. Bermudez lost the bout via unanimous decision.

Bermudez faced Charles Rosa on October 18, 2019, at UFC on ESPN 6. At the weigh-in, Bermudez weighed in at 148 pounds, 2 pounds over the featherweight non-title fight limit of 146. The bout was held at catchweight. Bermudez was fined 20% of his purse which went to Rosa. He lost the fight via a submission in round one, and was subsequently released from the promotion.

=== Post-UFC career ===
On January 20, 2020, news surfaced that Bermudez would face Bruce Boyington at New England Fights 42 on February 8, 2020, replacing Josh Grispi who was forced to withdraw from the bout due to legal complications. At the weigh-ins, Bermudez missed the lightweight title fight weight limit, making him ineligible for the championship. Bermudez won the fight via first-round submission.

== Personal life ==
Bermudez is a student at Bridgewater State University, majoring in Business Management.

== Mixed martial arts record ==
Professional record breakdown
17 matches	15 wins	2 losses
By knockout	1	0
By submission	12	1
By decision	2	1

Res.	Record	Opponent	Method	Event	Date	Round	Time	Location	Notes
Win	15–2	Bruce Boyington	Submission (guillotine choke)	New England Fights 42	February 8, 2020	1	1:54	Portland, Maine, United States	Catchweight (158.8 lbs) bout; Bermudez missed weight.
Loss	14–2	Charles Rosa	Submission (armbar)	UFC on ESPN: Reyes vs. Weidman	October 18, 2019	1	2:46	Boston, Massachusetts, United States	Return to Featherweight; Bermudez missed weight (148 lbs).
Loss	14–1	Casey Kenney	Decision (unanimous)	UFC 241	August 17, 2019	3	5:00	Anaheim, California, United States	Catchweight (140 lbs) bout.
Win	14–0	Benito Lopez	Submission (guillotine choke)	UFC on ESPN: Ngannou vs. Velasquez	February 17, 2019	1	3:09	Phoenix, Arizona, United States	Catchweight (140 lbs) bout; Bermudez missed weight.
Win	13–0	Davey Grant	Technical Submission (triangle choke)	UFC Fight Night: Shogun vs. Smith	November 19, 2018	1	0:59	Hamburg, Germany	
Win	12–0	Albert Morales	Submission (guillotine choke)	UFC on Fox: Emmett vs. Stephens	February 24, 2018	2	2:33	Orlando, Florida, United States	
Win	11–0	Seth Basler	Submission (triangle choke)	Cage Titans 37	January 27, 2018	1	1:06	Plymouth, Massachusetts, United States	
Win	10–0	Bendy Casimir	Submission (triangle choke)	Cage Titans 35	August 12, 2017	1	1:12	Plymouth, Massachusetts, United States	
Win	9–0	Tony Gravely	Submission (armbar)	Cage Titans 33	April 8, 2017	1	N/A	Plymouth, Massachusetts, United States	Bantamweight debut.
Win	8–0	Saul Almeida	Decision (split)	CES MMA 39	November 4, 2016	3	5:00	Plymouth, Massachusetts, United States	
Win	7–0	Rodrigo Almeida	Submission (guillotine choke)	Cage Titans 30	August 27, 2016	1	0:54	Plymouth, Massachusetts, United States	Return to Featherweight.
Win	6–0	Jeff Anderson	Submission (guillotine choke)	Cage Titans 29	June 18, 2016	1	1:06	Plymouth, Massachusetts, United States	Lightweight debut.
Win	5–0	Dan Dubuque	Decision (unanimous)	Cage Titans 27	January 30, 2016	3	5:00	Plymouth, Massachusetts, United States	
Win	4–0	Evan Parker	Submission (rear-naked choke)	CES MMA 32	January 8, 2016	1	1:43	Lincoln, Rhode Island, United States	
Win	3–0	Scott Gorgone	Submission (triangle choke)	Cage Titans 26	November 7, 2015	1	1:24	Plymouth, Massachusetts, United States	
Win	2–0	Mak Kelleher	Submission (triangle choke)	CES MMA 30	August 14, 2015	1	3:05	Lincoln, Rhode Island, United States	
Win	1–0	Manny Torres	TKO (punches)	Cage Titans 24	June 20, 2015	1	2:57	Plymouth, Massachusetts, United States	Featherweight debut.

== See also ==
- List of current UFC fighters
- List of male mixed martial artists
