= UFC Fight Night: Poirier vs. Johnson =

UFC mixed martial arts event in 2016

- The poster for UFC Fight Night: Poirier vs. Johnson
- Promotion: Ultimate Fighting Championship
- Date: September 17, 2016
- Venue: State Farm Arena
- City: Hidalgo, Texas
- Attendance: 5,624
- Total gate: $323,419

Event chronology
UFC 203: Miocic vs. Overeem	UFC Fight Night: Poirier vs. Johnson	UFC Fight Night: Cyborg vs. Länsberg

UFC Fight Night: Poirier vs. Johnson (also known as UFC Fight Night 94) was a mixed martial arts event produced by the Ultimate Fighting Championship held on September 17, 2016, at State Farm Arena in Hidalgo, Texas.

== Background ==
After contesting several other PPV and Fight Night events across Texas, this was the first that the promotion has hosted in Hidalgo.

A lightweight bout between Dustin Poirier and Michael Johnson served as the event headliner.

Manvel Gamburyan was scheduled to face Alejandro Pérez at the event. However, Gamburyan pulled out of the fight in mid-August for undisclosed personal reasons and was replaced by Albert Morales.

Abel Trujillo was expected to face Evan Dunham at the event. However, Trujillo pulled out of the fight on September 5, citing an undisclosed injury. In turn, former WSOF Featherweight Champion and promotional newcomer Rick Glenn was announced as his replacement.

== Results ==
Main Card (Fox Sports 1)
Weight class				Method	Round	Time	Notes
Lightweight	Michael Johnson	def.	Dustin Poirier	KO (punches)	1	1:35
Middleweight	Derek Brunson	def.	Uriah Hall	TKO (punch)	1	1:41
Lightweight	Evan Dunham	def.	Ricky Glenn	Decision (unanimous) (30–27, 30–27, 30–27)	3	5:00
Welterweight	Roan Carneiro	def.	Kenny Robertson	Decision (split) (28–29, 30–27, 29–28)	3	5:00
Lightweight	Islam Makhachev	def.	Chris Wade	Decision (unanimous) (29–28, 29–28, 29–28)	3	5:00
Featherweight	Chas Skelly	def.	Maximo Blanco	Technical Submission (anaconda choke)	1	0:19
Preliminary Card (Fox Sports 1)
Featherweight	Gabriel Benítez	def.	Sam Sicilia	Technical Submission (standing guillotine choke)	2	1:20
Welterweight	Belal Muhammad	def.	Augusto Montaño	TKO (punches)	3	4:19
Middleweight	Antônio Carlos Júnior	def.	Leonardo Augusto Guimarães	Submission (rear-naked choke)	3	4:46	(Note: Júnior was deducted one point in round 1 due to an illegal knee.)
Bantamweight	José Alberto Quiñónez	def.	Joey Gomez	Decision (unanimous) (29–28, 30–27, 30–27)	3	5:00
Preliminary Card (UFC Fight Pass)
Welterweight	Randy Brown	def.	Erick Montaño	Submission (guillotine choke)	3	0:18
Bantamweight	Albert Morales	vs.	Alejandro Pérez	Draw (majority) (29–27, 28–28, 28–28)	3	5:00	(Note: Pérez was deducted one point at the end of round 2 for hitting Morales after the bell.)

== Bonus awards ==
The following fighters were awarded $50,000 bonuses:

- Fight of the Night: Evan Dunham vs. Rick Glenn
- Performance of the Night: Michael Johnson and Chas Skelly

== See also ==
- List of UFC events
- 2016 in UFC
