= João Carvalho (fighter) =

Portuguese mixed martial arts fighter (1988-2016)

João Carvalho (1988 – 11 April 2016) was a Portuguese mixed martial arts fighter under the Total Extreme Fighting promotion. He represented Portuguese club Team Nobrega as a welterweight fighter.

== Mixed martial arts career ==
Shortly after being beaten by technical knockout in a fight on 9 April 2016 against Charlie Ward (who went on to fight in the UFC following the fight), Carvalho began to feel ill. He was taken to Beaumont Hospital, Dublin, where he underwent emergency brain surgery. He died in the hospital's intensive care unit on 11 April 2016.

The death of Carvalho aroused rage and an explosion of debate and criticism. Ward's father and the MMA community shared the sentiment that his fight on April 9 should have been stopped much earlier. The referee who was in charge of the fight, Mariusz Domasat, defended his decision and said "If you watch the fight you see clearly there was no reason to stop the fight earlier. I stopped the fight when there was a reason to stop the fight, when the fighter wasn't willing to fight anymore, that's it. Everyone who has any idea about MMA knows the fight was stopped at the exact proper time. I am an experienced referee and part of the Irish Amateur Pankration Association... and I know what I am doing." Subsequently, Ireland Minister of State for Tourism and Sport, Michael Ring, spoke of his long concern for the safety aspect of the sport. He had written to 17 MMA promoters in Ireland that he expected MMA to adhere to the same safety standards that applied in other sports.

== Mixed martial arts record ==
Professional record breakdown
3 matches	1 win	2 losses
By knockout	1	2

Res.	Record	Opponent	Method	Event	Date	Round	Time	Location	Notes
Loss	1–2	Charlie Ward	TKO (punches)	Total Extreme Fighting 1	9 April 2016	3	N/A	Dublin, Ireland	
Win	1–1	Hugo Peixoto	TKO (punches)	International Pro Combat 8	16 November 2015	1	4:59	Lisbon, Portugal	
Loss	0–1	Arlindo Prates	TKO (doctor stoppage)	International Pro Combat 7	27 April 2015	1	5:00	Lisbon, Portugal	

== See also ==
- Fatalities in mixed martial arts contests
