= Thomas Almeida =

Brazilian mixed martial arts fighter

- Born: 31 July 1991 (age 35); São Paulo, Brazil
- Nickname: Thominhas
- Height: 5 ft 7 in (170 cm)
- Weight: 135 lb (61 kg; 9.6 st)
- Division: Bantamweight
- Reach: 70 in (178 cm)
- Style: Muay Thai, Brazilian Jiu-Jitsu
- Fighting out of: São Paulo, Brazil
- Team: Chute Boxe Academy; Xtreme Couture
- Rank: Brown belt in Brazilian Jiu-Jitsu
- Years active: 2011–present

Mixed martial arts record
- Total: 28
- Wins: 23
- By knockout: 17
- By submission: 4
- By decision: 2
- Losses: 5
- By knockout: 3
- By decision: 2

Other information
- Website: thomasalmeida.com
- Mixed martial arts record from Sherdog

Thomas Almeida (born 31 July 1991) is a Brazilian professional mixed martial artist, who currently competes in the Bantamweight division. A professional competitor since 2011, Almeida formerly competed for the Ultimate Fighting Championship (UFC) and Legacy FC, where he became the Legacy FC Bantamweight Champion, vacating the title shortly after signing with the UFC.

== Mixed martial arts career ==
=== Early career ===
Almeida made his professional mixed martial arts debut in November 2011. He fought extensively in his native Brazil and amassed a record of 7–0 with four wins via KO before making his Legacy FC debut.

Almeida is managed by Wade Hampel of Big Fight Management.

=== Legacy Fighting Championship ===
Almeida made his Legacy Fighting Championship debut against Cody Williams on 16 November 2012, at Legacy FC 15. Almeida won the fight via KO in the first round.

Almeida faced George Pacurariu on 6 December 2013 at Legacy FC 26. Almeida won the fight via TKO in the first round.

Almeida was expected to face Aaron Philips on 20 June 2014, at Legacy FC 32 for the vacant Legacy FC Bantamweight Championship. However, Philips pulled out of the fight, and he was replaced by Caio Machado. Almeida won the fight via TKO in the first round to win the Legacy FC Bantamweight Championship.

=== Ultimate Fighting Championship ===
In June 2014, the UFC announced that they had signed Almeida to a multi-fight contract.

Almeida made his promotional debut against Tim Gorman on 8 November 2014 at UFC Fight Night 56. Almeida won the fight via unanimous decision, marking the first time ever he didn't finish an opponent in his pro career. The fight also earned him his first Fight of the Night bonus award.

Almeida faced Yves Jabouin on 25 April 2015 at UFC 186. He won the fight via TKO in the first round. This win also secured Almedia his first Performance of the Night bonus award.

Almeida faced Brad Pickett on 11 July 2015 at UFC 189. Despite getting dropped twice in the first round, Almeida won the fight via knockout with a flying knee in the second round and also earned a Performance of the Night bonus.

Almeida faced Anthony Birchak on 7 November 2015 at UFC Fight Night 77. He won the fight via knockout in the first round. The win resulted in his third consecutive Performance of the Night bonus.

Almeida faced fellow undefeated prospect Cody Garbrandt on 29 May 2016 at UFC Fight Night 88. Despite being the betting favorite, Almeida had no answer for Garbrandt's hand speed and accuracy and lost the fight via knockout in the first round.

Almeida next faced Albert Morales on 19 November 2016 at UFC Fight Night 100. He won the fight via TKO in the second round and was awarded a Performance of the Night bonus.

Almeida faced Jimmie Rivera on 22 July 2017 at UFC on Fox 25. He lost the fight via unanimous decision.

Almedia next faced Rob Font on 20 January 2018 at UFC 220. He lost the fight via TKO in the second round.

Almeida was expected to face Marlon Vera on 2 March 2019 at UFC 235. However, Almeida pulled out of the fight on 31 January, citing an injury. It was later revealed that he was experiencing major issues with his vision and required eye surgery. In August 2019, Almeida announced that he hoped to return to action by end of 2019.

Almeida was expected to face Alejandro Pérez on 11 October 2020 at UFC Fight Night 179. However, it was announced on 2 October that Pérez was forced out due to testing positive for COVID-19. He was replaced by Jonathan Martinez and the bout was moved a week later to UFC Fight Night: Ortega vs. The Korean Zombie. Almeida lost the fight via unanimous decision.

Almeida faced Sean O'Malley on 27 March 2021 at UFC 260. After being knocked down in the first round, he eventually lost the fight via knockout in the third round.

After the loss, it was announced Almeida was no longer part of the UFC roster.

=== Post UFC ===
Almeida was scheduled to face Taylor Moore in a featherweight bout on 14 September 2024 in the main event at "Art of Scrap 9". For unknown reasons, the bout was postponed to 26 April 2025 at "Art of Scrap 10".

== Championships and accomplishments ==
- MMA Super Heroes
  - MMASH Bantamweight Championship (one time)
- Legacy Fighting Championship
  - Legacy FC Bantamweight Championship (one time)
- Ultimate Fighting Championship
  - Fight of the Night (One time) vs. Tim Gorman
  - Performance of the Night (Four times) vs. Yves Jabouin, Brad Pickett, Anthony Birchak and Albert Morales
  - UFC.com Awards
    - 2015: Ranked #9 Knockout of the Year vs. Brad Pickett
- MMA Junkie
  - 2014 November Fight of the Month vs. Tim Gorman
  - 2015 #3 Ranked Knockout of the Year vs. Brad Pickett at UFC 189
  - 2015 July Knockout of the Month vs. Brad Pickett

== Mixed martial arts record ==
Professional record breakdown
28 matches	23 wins	5 losses
By knockout	17	3
By submission	4	0
By decision	2	2

Res.	Record	Opponent	Method	Event	Date	Round	Time	Location	Notes
Win	23–5	Taylor Moore	Decision (unanimous)	Art of Scrap 10	April 11, 2025	3	5:00	Fort Wayne, Indiana, United States	Return to Featherweight.
Loss	22–5	Sean O'Malley	KO (punch)	UFC 260	27 March 2021	3	3:52	Las Vegas, Nevada, United States	
Loss	22–4	Jonathan Martinez	Decision (unanimous)	UFC Fight Night: Ortega vs. The Korean Zombie	18 October 2020	3	5:00	Abu Dhabi, United Arab Emirates	Featherweight bout.
Loss	22–3	Rob Font	TKO (head kick and punches)	UFC 220	20 January 2018	2	2:24	Boston, Massachusetts, United States	
Loss	22–2	Jimmie Rivera	Decision (unanimous)	UFC on Fox: Weidman vs. Gastelum	22 July 2017	3	5:00	Uniondale, New York, United States	
Win	22–1	Albert Morales	TKO (punches)	UFC Fight Night: Bader vs. Nogueira 2	19 November 2016	2	1:37	São Paulo, Brazil	Performance of the Night.
Loss	21–1	Cody Garbrandt	KO (punches)	UFC Fight Night: Almeida vs. Garbrandt	29 May 2016	1	2:53	Las Vegas, Nevada, United States	
Win	21–0	Anthony Birchak	KO (punch)	UFC Fight Night: Belfort vs. Henderson 3	7 November 2015	1	4:24	São Paulo, Brazil	Performance of the Night.
Win	20–0	Brad Pickett	KO (flying knee)	UFC 189	11 July 2015	2	0:29	Las Vegas, Nevada, United States	Performance of the Night.
Win	19–0	Yves Jabouin	TKO (punches)	UFC 186	25 April 2015	1	4:18	Montreal, Quebec, Canada	Performance of the Night.
Win	18–0	Tim Gorman	Decision (unanimous)	UFC Fight Night: Shogun vs. Saint Preux	8 November 2014	3	5:00	Uberlândia, Brazil	Fight of the Night.
Win	17–0	Caio Machado	TKO (body punch)	Legacy FC 32	20 June 2014	1	4:17	Bossier City, Louisiana, United States	Won the Legacy FC Bantamweight Championship.
Win	16–0	Vinicius Zani	TKO (punches)	MMA Super Heroes 3	30 March 2014	4	3:52	São Paulo, Brazil	Won the MMA Super Heroes Bantamweight Championship.
Win	15–0	George Pacurariu	TKO (punches)	Legacy FC 26	6 December 2013	1	4:31	San Antonio, Texas, United States	
Win	14–0	Cemir Silva	TKO (punches)	Standout Fighting Tournament 1	20 September 2013	2	4:42	São Paulo, Brazil	Featherweight bout.
Win	13–0	Willidy Viana	TKO (punches)	Alfenas Balada Fight 1	9 August 2013	1	0:47	São Paulo, Brazil	
Win	12–0	Valdines Silva	KO (knee and punches)	MMA Super Heroes 1	13 July 2013	1	2:46	Louveira, Brazil	
Win	11–0	José Alexandre	TKO (punches)	Bison FC 1	4 July 2013	1	3:18	São Paulo, Brazil	
Win	10–0	Gilmar Sales	TKO (punches)	Fair Fight: MMA Edition	16 December 2012	1	2:32	São Paulo, Brazil	
Win	9–0	Cody Williams	KO (elbow)	Legacy FC 15	16 November 2012	1	2:28	Houston, Texas, United States	Bantamweight debut.
Win	8–0	Vander Correa	KO (punch)	Predador FC 22	20 October 2012	1	2:21	São José do Rio Preto, Brazil	
Win	7–0	Michel Igenho	KO (punches)	Predador FC 21	11 August 2012	1	3:02	Campo Grande, Brazil	
Win	6–0	Samuel Lima Brito	Submission (guillotine choke)	Gladiador Fight 3	19 May 2012	1	1:32	Araçatuba, Brazil	
Win	5–0	Ivonei Pridonik	TKO (head kick and punches)	Nitrix Champion Fight 11	5 May 2012	1	1:21	Joinville, Brazil	
Win	4–0	Edmilson Atanasio	TKO (punches)	Union Combat 1	4 April 2012	1	1:57	São Paulo, Brazil	
Win	3–0	Jorge Fernando	Submission (armbar)	Gold Fight Selection 3	25 February 2012	1	0:47	São Paulo, Brazil	
Win	2–0	Danilo Molina	Submission (armbar)	Thai Fight 3	29 November 2011	1	2:16	Taboão da Serra, Brazil	
Win	1–0	Jackson de Padua	Submission (rear-naked choke)	Blessed Fight 4	21 May 2011	1	4:03	São Paulo, Brazil	

== See also ==
- List of male mixed martial artists
