= Albert Morales =

American mixed martial arts fighter

- Born: Albert Franklin Morales Blacutt; May 25, 1991 (age 35); Los Angeles, California, U.S.
- Other names: The Warrior
- Height: 5 ft 9 in (1.75 m)
- Weight: 135 lb (61 kg; 9.6 st)
- Division: Bantamweight
- Reach: 72 in (183 cm)
- Fighting out of: Reseda, California
- Team: Carlson Gracie Southbay; Black House (2019–present); The movement Gym (formerly)
- Rank: Brown belt in Brazilian Jiu-Jitsu under André "Alemão" Vanconcellos
- Years active: 2015–present

Mixed martial arts record
- Total: 30
- Wins: 18
- By knockout: 9
- By submission: 5
- By decision: 4
- Losses: 11
- By knockout: 2
- By submission: 4
- By decision: 5
- Draws: 1

Other information
- Mixed martial arts record from Sherdog

Albert Morales (born May 25, 1991) is an American mixed martial artist who competes in the Bantamweight division. He has also competed in the Ultimate Fighting Championship (UFC) and of Bellator MMA.

== Background ==
Born and raised in Southern California, Morales began training in mixed martial arts in 2013 at the age of 21. He turned to a strict training regimen in hopes of overcoming being a convicted felon. Albert Morales is of Belizean descent and proudly waves Belizean flag at UFC weigh in events.

== Mixed martial arts career ==
After four amateur fights, Morales made his professional debut in January 2015. He compiled an undefeated record of 6 - 0 on the regional scene in Southern California, including two stoppage victories for Bellator MMA and a decision win World Series of Fighting.

He signed with the UFC on the heels of a first round finish of Mario Israel at RFA 38 in June 2016.

=== Ultimate Fighting Championship ===
Morales made his promotional debut on September 17, 2016 at UFC Fight Night 94 where he was tabbed as a short notice replacement for Manvel Gamburyan to face Alejandro Pérez. The fight was scored a majority draw.

Morales next faced Thomas Almeida on November 19, 2016 at UFC Fight Night 100. He lost the fight via TKO in the second round.

Morales faced promotional newcomer Andre Soukhamthath on March 4, 2017 at UFC 209. He won the back-and-forth fight by split decision.

Morales was tabbed as a short notice replacement for Mitch Gagnon to face Brett Johns on July 16, 2017 at UFC Fight Night 113. He lost the bout by unanimous decision.

Morales faced Benito Lopez on December 9, 2017 at UFC Fight Night 123. He lost the back-and-forth fight by unanimous decision.

Morales faced promotional newcomer Manny Bermudez on February 24, 2018 at UFC on Fox 28. He lost the fight via submission in the second round.

On August 14, 2018, it was announced that Morales was released from UFC.

=== Post-UFC career ===
Morales faced James Barnes at Golden Boy Promotions' inaugural MMA event on November 24, 2018. He lost the fight via an armbar. Subsequently, Morales decided to change his camp to Black House.

Morales next fought Carlos Puente Jr. at CXF 17 on March 9, 2019. He won the fight via first round submission.

==== Lights Out Xtreme Fighting ====
In early 2019, Morales signed with Shawne Merriman's new promotion Lights Out Xtreme Fighting. Morales headlined the inaugural LXF 1 event against Alfred Khaskakyan on May 11, 2019. The bout was for the inaugural LXF Bantamweight Championship, however Khaskakyan missed weight, making him ineligible for the title. Morales lost the fight via first-round knockout.

Morales made his sophomore appearance in the promotion against Ron Scolesdang in a bantamweight title eliminator bout at LXF 3 on September 21, 2019. He won the fight via first-round knockout.

Morales got his second change at the LXF Bantamweight Championship against Ryan Lilley at LXF 4 on November 15, 2019. He claimed the title with a third-round doctor stoppage.

Morales was expected to defend his title in a rematch against Ryan Lilley at LXF 5 on March 13, 2020. However, the event was tentatively rescheduled to be held on April 24, 2020 due to the COVID-19 pandemic.

==== Bellator MMA ====
Morales, as a replacement for James Gallagher, faced Patchy Mix at Bellator 258 on May 7, 2021. He lost the bout via arm-triangle choke in the third round.

==== Return to Lights Out Xtreme Fighting ====
Morales faced Victor Henry at LXF 6 on October 30, 2021. He lost the bout via rear-naked choke in the second round.

==== Up Next Fighting ====
Morales faced Ryan Lilly at UNF 1 on May 21, 2022. He won via unanimous decision in the three round main event.

Morales faced Terrion Ware for the UNF Featherweight Championship on August 20, 2022 at UNF 2. He won the bout via arm-triangle choke in the third round.

Defending his belt for the first time against Javier Garcia on February 25, 2023 at UNF 5, Morales lost the bout and belt via unanimous decision.

==== Most Valuable Promotions ====
Morales faced David Mgoyan on May 16, 2026 at MVP MMA 1. He lost the fight by unanimous decision.

== Championships and accomplishments ==
- Lights Out Xtreme Fighting
  - Lights Out Xtreme Fighting Bantamweight Champion (One time; augural)
- Up Next Fighting
  - UNF Featherweight Championship (One time; augural)

== Mixed martial arts record ==
Professional record breakdown
31 matches	19 wins	11 losses
By knockout	9	2
By submission	6	4
By decision	4	5
Draws	1	

Res.	Record	Opponent	Method	Event	Date	Round	Time	Location	Notes
Loss	19–11–1	David Mgoyan	Decision (unanimous)	MVP MMA: Rousey vs. Carano	May 16, 2026	3	5:00	Inglewood, California, United States	
Win	19–10–1	Taron Grigoryan	Submission (rear-naked choke)	Up Next Fighting 30	January 31, 2026	2	1:37	Commerce, California, United States	Defended the UNF Featherweight Championship.
Loss	18–10–1	Johnny Robles	Decision (unanimous)	Up Next Fighting 25	May 31, 2025	3	5:00	Commerce, California, United States	Bantamweight bout.
Win	18–9–1	Chase Gibson	TKO (punches)	Up Next Fighting 23	March 1, 2025	2	0:10	Commerce, California, United States	Won the vacant UNF Featherweight Championship.
Win	17–9–1	Francisco Rivera	TKO (punches)	Up Next Fighting 21	November 30, 2024	1	4:44	Commerce, California, United States	
Win	16–9–1	Jesse Strader	Decision (unanimous)	Up Next Fighting 20	September 28, 2024	3	5:00	Commerce, California, United States	
Win	15–9–1	Emran Tara Khail	TKO (punches)	Lights Out Xtreme Fighting 14	February 16, 2024	1	4:24	Long Beach, California, United States	Won the vacant LXOF Bantamweight Championship.
Win	14–9–1	Luciano Ramos	TKO (punches)	Lights Out Xtreme Fighting 12	November 18, 2023	1	2:18	Long Beach, California, United States	Catchweight (140 lb) bout.
Win	13–9–1	Musa Toliver	TKO (punches)	Lights Out Xtreme Fighting 11	October 7, 2023	1	3:30	Long Beach, California, United States	Catchweight (140 lb) bout.
Loss	12–9–1	Javier Garcia	Decision (unanimous)	Up Next Fighting 5	February 25, 2023	3	5:00	Commerce, California, United States	Lost the UNF Featherweight Championship.
Win	12–8–1	Terrion Ware	Submission (arm-triangle choke)	Up Next Fighting 2	August 20, 2022	3	1:28	Commerce, California, United States	Won the inaugural UNF Featherweight Championship.
Win	11–8–1	Ryan Lilley	Decision (unanimous)	Up Next Fighting 1	May 21, 2022	3	5:00	Burbank, California, United States	Return to Featherweight.
Loss	10–8–1	Victor Henry	Submission (rear-naked choke)	Lights Out Xtreme Fighting 6	October 30, 2021	2	1:46	Burbank, California, United States	Lost the LOXF Bantamweight Championship.
Loss	10–7–1	Patchy Mix	Submission (arm-triangle choke)	Bellator 258	May 7, 2021	3	2:40	Uncasville, Connecticut, United States	
Win	10–6–1	Ryan Lilley	TKO (doctor stoppage)	Lights Out Xtreme Fighting 4	November 15, 2019	3	0:03	Burbank, California, United States	Won the LOXF Bantamweight Championship.
Win	9–6–1	Ron Scolesdang	TKO (punches)	Lights Out Xtreme Fighting 3	September 21, 2019	1	4:50	Commerce, California, United States	LOXF Bantamweight title eliminator.
Loss	8–6–1	Alfred Khashakyan	TKO (punches)	Lights Out Xtreme Fighting 1	May 11, 2019	1	3:58	Burbank, California, United States	For the inaugural LOXF Bantamweight Championship.
Win	8–5–1	Carlos Puente Jr.	Submission (rear-naked choke)	California Xtreme Fighting 17	March 9, 2019	1	1:30	Los Angeles, California, United States	Catchweight (140 lb) bout.
Loss	7–5–1	James Barnes	Submission (armbar)	Golden Boy Promotions: Liddell vs. Ortiz 3	November 24, 2018	3	4:09	Inglewood, California, United States	
Loss	7–4–1	Manny Bermudez	Submission (guillotine choke)	UFC on Fox: Emmett vs. Stephens	February 24, 2018	2	2:33	Orlando, Florida, United States	
Loss	7–3–1	Benito Lopez	Decision (unanimous)	UFC Fight Night: Swanson vs. Ortega	December 9, 2017	3	5:00	Fresno, California, United States	
Loss	7–2–1	Brett Johns	Decision (unanimous)	UFC Fight Night: Nelson vs. Ponzinibbio	July 16, 2017	3	5:00	Glasgow, Scotland	
Win	7–1–1	Andre Soukhamthath	Decision (split)	UFC 209	March 4, 2017	3	5:00	Las Vegas, Nevada, United States	
Loss	6–1–1	Thomas Almeida	TKO (punches)	UFC Fight Night: Bader vs. Nogueira 2	November 19, 2016	2	1:37	São Paulo, Brazil	
Draw	6–0–1	Alejandro Pérez	Draw (majority)	UFC Fight Night: Poirier vs. Johnson	September 17, 2016	3	5:00	Hidalgo, Texas, United States	Pérez was deducted one point due to hitting Morales after the end of round 2.
Win	6–0	Mario Israel	KO (punch)	RFA 38	June 3, 2016	1	0:20	Costa Mesa, California, United States	
Win	5–0	Anthony Paredes	Decision (unanimous)	WSOF 28	February 20, 2016	3	5:00	Garden Grove, California, United States	Return to Bantamweight.
Win	4–0	Kurt Weinrich	Submission (triangle choke)	West Coast FC 16	January 23, 2016	1	2:31	Sacramento, California, United States	Featherweight debut.
Win	3–0	David Suruy	Submission (triangle choke)	BAMMA Badbeat 17	October 2, 2015	1	0:59	Commerce, California, United States	
Win	2–0	John Yoo	TKO (punches)	Bellator 137	May 15, 2015	3	1:37	Temecula, California, United States	
Win	1–0	Fabian Gonzalez	Submission (rear-naked choke)	Bellator 132	January 16, 2015	2	3:12	Temecula, California, United States	Bantamweight debut.

== See also ==
- List of male mixed martial artists
