= Charlie Ward (fighter) =

Irish mixed martial arts fighter

- Born: 17 December 1980 (age 45); Mountmellick, Ireland
- Other names: Relentless
- Nationality: Irish
- Height: 5 ft 11 in (1.80 m)
- Weight: 186 lb (84.5 kg; 13 st 4 lb)
- Division: Middleweight; Welterweight
- Reach: 73.5 in (187 cm)
- Stance: Orthodox
- Fighting out of: Dublin, Ireland
- Team: Straight Blast Gym Ireland
- Trainer: John Kavanagh
- Years active: 2014–2023

Mixed martial arts record
- Total: 17
- Wins: 10
- By knockout: 6
- By decision: 4
- Losses: 7
- By knockout: 3
- By submission: 1
- By decision: 3

Other information
- Mixed martial arts record from Sherdog

Charlie Ward (born 17 December 1980) is an Irish former mixed martial artist who competed in the middleweight division. A professional competitor since 2014, he formerly competed for the UFC and Bellator MMA.

== Mixed martial arts career ==
=== Early career ===
Ward held an amateur record of 2–0 before beginning his professional MMA career in 2015, competing for regional promotions in the United Kingdom and Ireland. He lost his debut where he was stopped in round two by John Phillips. He rebounded with three straight victories, winning over Ciaran Daly, João Carvalho and Gareth Williams.

=== Ultimate Fighting Championship ===
Ward was signed by the UFC in 2016. with the record of 3–1.

Ward was expected to make his promotional debut against Randy Brown on 9 December 2016 at UFC Fight Night 102. However, Ward was pulled from that fight in early November due to alleged visa issues which restricted his travel to the United States and was replaced by fellow newcomer Brian Camozzi. In turn, he was quickly rescheduled to face Abdul Razak Alhassan on 19 November 2016 at UFC Fight Night: Mousasi vs. Hall 2. Ward suffered a quick defeat where he was finished via knockout in the fight's opening minute.

Ward faced Galore Bofando at UFC Fight Night: Nelson vs. Ponzinibbio on 16 July 2017. He lost the fight via knockout after Bofando slammed him to the mat with a hip toss early in the first round. He was subsequently released from the promotion.

=== Bellator MMA ===
Ward made the move to join Bellator MMA and made his debut on 10 November 2017 at Bellator 187 in Dublin against John Redmond. Ward knocked out Redmond at the end of round one, however referee Marc Goddard needed to verify that the knock out was before the buzzer. Conor McGregor, Ward's teammate, jumped the cage to celebrate with Ward before the fight was officially declared over. McGregor was separated from Goddard, and in turn charged towards Goddard and pushed and confronted Goddard in a wild melee which caused an official to bump into Redmond as he was getting up.

McGregor did a lap of the cage and exited a few minutes later but then scaled and straddled the cage apron to continue the celebration of Ward's winning. He was stopped by a commissioner and McGregor was agitated and slapped the commissioner's face as McGregor admitted saying "Did you see your man trying to grab me and I gave him a clatter in the face" Redmond stated after the fight that Goddard had intended to continue to fight to round two but Mohegan Sun commission who oversaw the event decided to end the fight and declared the win to Ward due to McGregor's behaviour in the ring.

For his second fight with the promotion, Ward faced Martin Hudson at Bellator 200 held in the Wembley Arena on 25 May 2018. He won the fight via TKO in the first round.

Ward faced Justin Moore at Bellator 223 on 22 June 2019. He won the fight via technical knockout in the second round.

On 15 August 2019, it was announced that Ward had signed an exclusive multi-fight, multi-year contract extension with Bellator. Ward was expected to face Pietro Penini at Bellator Dublin on 27 September 2019, but the bout was scrapped due to Ward's injury. Subsequently, the bout was rescheduled to Bellator London 2 on 23 November 2019. Ward lost the fight via unanimous decision.

Next, Ward faced Kyle Kurtz at Bellator 240 on 22 February 2020. Ward rebounded from the loss via third-round knockout.

Ward faced Andy Manzolo at Bellator Milan 3 on 3 October 2020. He won the fight via unanimous decision.

Ward was scheduled to face Norbert Növényi Jr. at Bellator 270 on 5 November 2021. On 6 October, Norbert announced that he had suffered a torn ACL and had to pull out of the bout and was replaced by Fabian Edwards. Ward had to pull out however due to a ruptured bicep.

Ward faced Alan Carlos at Bellator 281 on 13 May 2022. He won the bout via unanimous decision.

Ward faced Fabian Edwards on 29 October 2022 at Bellator 287. He lost the bout via unanimous decision.

Ward faced Mike Shipman on 25 February 2023 at Bellator 291. He lost the bout via unanimous decision.

Ward faced Grégory Babene on 23 September 2023 at Bellator 299, losing the bout guillotine choke in the first round.

== Death of João Carvalho ==
Ward's victory over João Carvalho by knockout at Total Extreme Fighting 1 on 9 April 2016 was overcast with a tragic circumstance. Carvalho felt unwell, suffering from a headache 20 minutes after the fight and was sent to hospital for brain surgery. He died at Beaumont Hospital in Dublin 48 hours later as a result of injuries he suffered in the defeat. His death sparked an outpouring of grief from the MMA community.

The death of Carvalho aroused considerable debate, focusing on the sentiment that the fight should have been stopped much earlier. The referee who was in charge of the fight, Mariusz Domasat, defended his decision and said "If you watch the fight you see clearly there was no reason to stop the fight earlier. I stopped the fight when there was a reason to stop the fight, when the fighter wasn't willing to fight anymore, that's it. Everyone who has any idea about MMA knows the fight was stopped at the exact proper time. I am an experienced referee and part of the Irish Amateur Pankration Association of Safe MMA and I know what I am doing." Subsequently, Minister for Travel, Tourism and Sport Michael Ring, reiterated his long concern of the safety aspect of the sport which he had written to 17 MMA promoters in Ireland where he expected MMA should adhere to the safety standards as applied in other sports.

== Mixed martial arts record ==
Professional record breakdown
17 matches	10 wins	7 losses
By knockout	6	3
By submission	0	1
By decision	4	3

Res.	Record	Opponent	Method	Event	Date	Round	Time	Location	Notes
Loss	10–7	Grégory Babene	Submission (guillotine choke)	Bellator 299	23 September 2023	1	1:03	Dublin, Ireland	
Loss	10–6	Mike Shipman	Decision (unanimous)	Bellator 291	25 February 2023	3	5:00	Dublin, Ireland	
Loss	10–5	Fabian Edwards	Decision (unanimous)	Bellator 287	29 October 2022	3	5:00	Milan, Italy	
Win	10–4	Alan Carlos	Decision (unanimous)	Bellator 281	13 May 2022	3	5:00	London, England	Catchweight (189.2 lb) bout; Carlos missed weight.
Win	9–4	Andy Manzolo	Decision (unanimous)	Bellator Milan 3	3 October 2020	3	5:00	Milan, Italy	
Win	8–4	Kyle Kurtz	TKO (punches)	Bellator 240	22 February 2020	3	4:24	Dublin, Ireland	
Loss	7–4	Pietro Penini Jr.	Decision (unanimous)	Bellator London 2	23 November 2019	3	5:00	London, England	
Win	7–3	Justin Moore	TKO (punches)	Bellator 223	22 June 2019	2	3:23	London, England	
Win	6–3	Jamie Stephenson	KO (punch)	Bellator 217	23 February 2019	1	0:34	Dublin, Ireland	
Win	5–3	Martin Hudson	TKO (punches)	Bellator 200	25 May 2018	1	2:23	London, England	
Win	4–3	John Redmond	KO (punches)	Bellator 187	10 November 2017	1	4:59	Dublin, Ireland	Return to Middleweight.
Loss	3–3	Galore Bofando	KO (slam)	UFC Fight Night: Nelson vs. Ponzinibbio	16 July 2017	1	2:10	Glasgow, Scotland	
Loss	3–2	Abdul Razak Alhassan	KO (punch)	UFC Fight Night: Mousasi vs. Hall 2	19 November 2016	1	0:53	Belfast, Northern Ireland	
Win	3–1	Gareth Williams	Decision (majority)	Adrenalin Fight Nights: Adrenalin Blast	4 June 2016	3	5:00	Swansea, Wales	Middleweight bout.
Win	2–1	João Carvalho	TKO (punches)	Total Extreme Fighting 1	9 April 2016	3	N/A	Dublin, Ireland	
Win	1–1	Ciaran Daly	Decision (unanimous)	Cage Kings 2	9 August 2015	3	5:00	Dublin, Ireland	Welterweight debut.
Loss	0–1	John Phillips	KO (punch)	Fightstar Promotions: Rage in the Cage 3	21 March 2015	2	0:00	Paisley, Scotland	Rage in the Cage Middleweight Tournament Quarterfinal.

== See also ==
- List of Irish UFC fighters
- List of male mixed martial artists
