= Bellator 267 =

Bellator mixed martial arts event in 2021

Bellator 267: Lima vs. MVP 2
- The poster for Bellator 267: Lima vs. MVP 2
- Promotion: Bellator MMA
- Date: October 1, 2021
- Venue: Wembley Arena
- City: London, England

Event chronology
Bellator 266: Davis vs. Romero	Bellator 267: Lima vs. MVP 2	Bellator 268: Nemkov vs. Anglickas

Bellator 267: Lima vs. MVP 2 was a mixed martial arts event produced by Bellator MMA that took place on October 1, 2021, at Wembley Arena in London, England.

== Background ==
Former three-time champion Douglas Lima returned to the cage for the first time since losing his title to Yaroslav Amosov, when he faced Michael "Venom" Page in a rematch at SSE Arena in London. The main card of the event, titled "Bellator London: Lima vs. MVP 2," aired live at 4 p.m. ET on Showtime. Page returned to fight in his home city for the first time since 2019, looking to avenge the lone defeat of his professional career when he was knocked out by Lima in the second round of their Bellator Welterweight World Grand Prix semifinal bout two years ago at Bellator 221.

The co-main event featured #5-ranked Featherweight Leah McCourt against Jessica Borga.

A lightweight bout between Charlie Leary and Gavin Hughes was scheduled for this event; however, Hughes pulled out due to a ruptured bicep and was replaced by Benjamin Brander. At weigh-ins, the bout was scrapped for COVID protocol issues.

== Results ==
Main Card (Showtime)
Weight class				Method	Round	Time	Notes
Welterweight	Michael Page	def.	Douglas Lima	Decision (split) (28–29, 29–28, 29–28)	3	5:00
Women's Featherweight	Leah McCourt	def.	Jessica Borga	Decision (unanimous) (30–27, 29–28, 29–28)	3	5:00
Featherweight	Rob Whiteford	vs.	Andrew Fisher	No Contest (accidental eye poke)	2	2:50
Light Heavyweight	Luke Trainer	def.	Yannick Bahati	TKO (elbow and punches)	2	2:50
Lightweight	Tim Wilde	def.	Yves Landu	Decision (unanimous) (29–28, 29–28, 29–28)	3	5:00
Preliminary card (Youtube/Pluto TV)
Welterweight	Lewis Long	def.	Michael Dubois	Technical Submission (rear-naked choke)	1	0:41
Lightweight	Davy Gallon	def.	Kane Mousah	Decision (unanimous) (29–28, 30–27, 30–27)	3	5:00
Women's Flyweight	Elina Kallionidou	def.	Petra Částková	Submission (heel hook)	1	2:07
Welterweight	Jack Grant	def.	Nathan Jones	TKO (punches)	1	2:16
Featherweight	Fabacary Diatta	def.	Nathan Rose	Decision (unanimous) (30–27, 30–27, 30–27)	3	5:00
Women's Strawweight	Chiara Penco	def.	Katharina Dalisda	Submission (armbar)	1	2:45
Bantamweight	Khurshed Kakhorov	def.	Jair Junior	Decision (unanimous) (30–27, 30–27, 30–27)	3	5:00

== See also ==
- 2021 in Bellator MMA
- List of Bellator MMA events
- List of current Bellator fighters
