= Rob Font =

American mixed martial artist (born 1987)

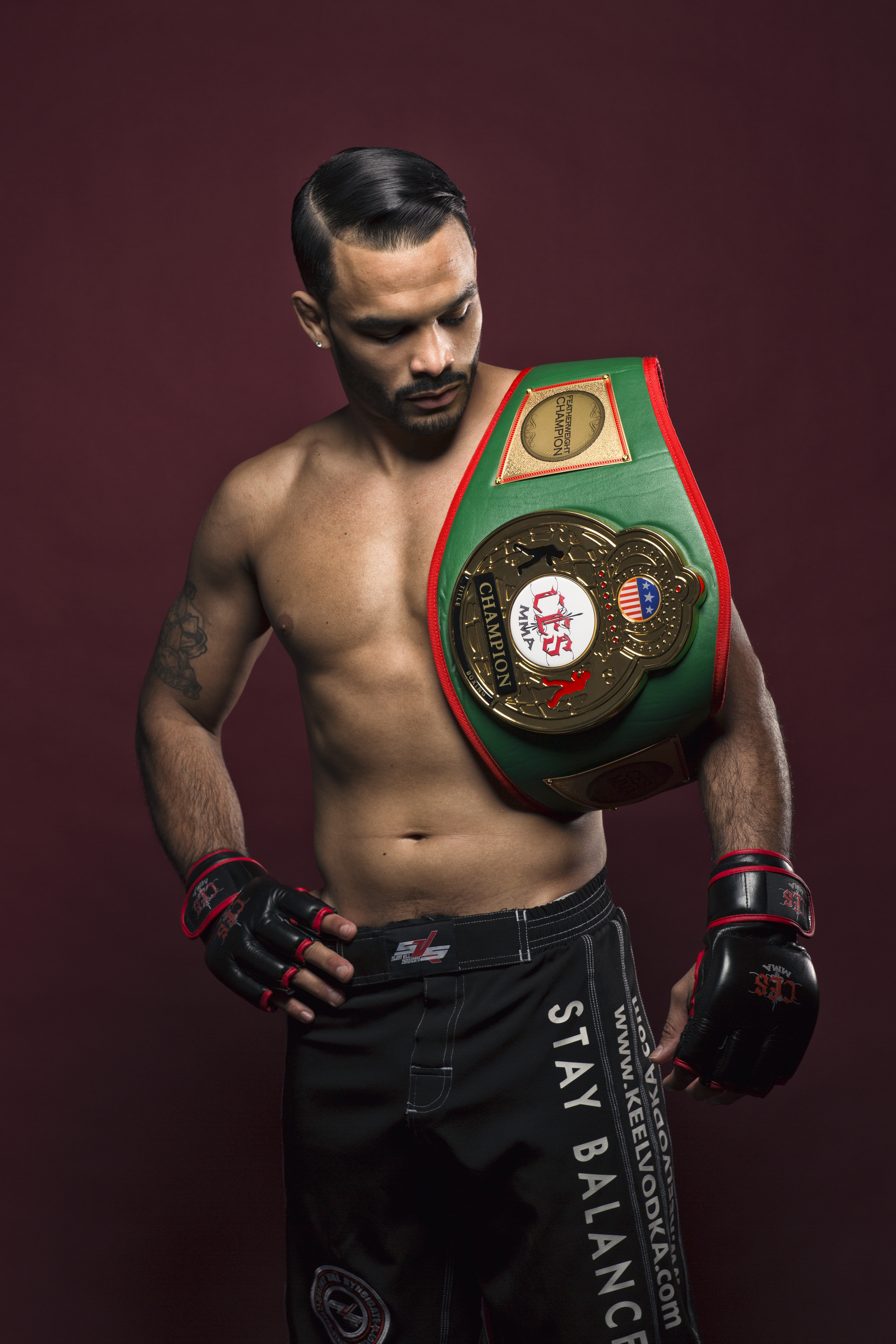
- Rob Font in 2013
- Born: Robert Spencer Font; June 25, 1987 (age 39); Leominster, Massachusetts, U.S.
- Height: 5 ft 8 in (1.73 m)
- Weight: 135 lb (61 kg; 9.6 st)
- Division: Bantamweight (2014–present); Featherweight (2012–2014); Lightweight (2011–2012)
- Reach: 71.5 in (182 cm)
- Stance: Orthodox
- Fighting out of: Woburn, Massachusetts, U.S.
- Team: New England Cartel; Team Sityodtong Boston
- Rank: Brown belt in Brazilian Jiu-Jitsu
- Years active: 2011–present

Mixed martial arts record
- Total: 32
- Wins: 22
- By knockout: 9
- By submission: 4
- By decision: 9
- Losses: 10
- By submission: 1
- By decision: 9

Other information
- Website: robfont.com
- Mixed martial arts record from Sherdog

Robert Spencer Font (born June 25, 1987) is a Puerto Rican-American professional mixed martial artist. He currently competes in the Bantamweight division of the Ultimate Fighting Championship (UFC). A professional since 2011, Font formerly competed for CES MMA, where he was the Featherweight Champion.

== Background ==
Font was born in Massachusetts, both parents were in the army, which led to Font moving around the world frequently due to their duties. He has an older sister and a younger brother.

Around the age of 21, Font was delivering pizzas for work, happening to make a delivery to fighters training in a garage. Their garage practice piqued Font's interest and he was enrolled for a free week of mixed martial arts training at a local gym soon after.

== Mixed martial arts career ==
=== Early career ===
A native of Central Massachusetts, Font began training as an amateur in 2009 and compiled a record of 3–1 before making his professional debut in December 2011.

Font compiled a record of 10–1 as a professional, competing for several regional promotions across his native New England before signing with the UFC in the spring of 2014.

=== Ultimate Fighting Championship ===
Font made his promotional debut against George Roop on July 5, 2014, at UFC 175. He won the fight via knockout in the first round. He also earned a Performance of the Night bonus.

For his next bout, Font was expected to face Chris Beal on September 5, 2014, at UFC Fight Night 50. However, Font pulled out of the bout, citing an injury.

Font was expected to face Mitch Gagnon on October 4, 2014, at UFC Fight Night 54. Subsequently, Font pulled out of the fight the week of the event, and he was replaced by Roman Salazar.

Font was expected to face Chris Williams on January 17, 2016, at UFC Fight Night 81. Subsequently, Williams was forced out of the fight due to an injury, and he was replaced by Joey Gomez. Font won the fight by TKO in the second round.

Font next faced John Lineker on May 14, 2016, at UFC 198. He lost the fight via unanimous decision.

Font was expected to face Ian Entwistle on October 8, 2016, at UFC 204. However, on the day prior to the event, Entwistle fell ill during the weight cutting process and the bout was scrapped.

Font was expected to face Alejandro Pérez on December 3, 2016, at The Ultimate Fighter 24 Finale. However, Perez pulled out of the fight on November 24. He was replaced by promotional newcomer Matt Schnell. Font won the fight via TKO in the first round.

Font faced Douglas Silva de Andrade on July 8, 2017, at UFC 213. He won the fight by submission in the second round. He earned the Performance of the Night award for the win.

Font faced Pedro Munhoz on October 28, 2017, at UFC Fight Night 119. He lost the fight via submission in round one.

Font faced Thomas Almeida on January 20, 2018, at UFC 220. He won the fight via TKO in the second round.

Font faced Raphael Assunção on July 7, 2018, at UFC 226. He lost the fight via unanimous decision.

Font faced Sergio Pettis on December 15, 2018, at UFC on Fox 31. He won the fight via unanimous decision.

Font was expected to face Cody Stamann on June 22, 2019, at UFC Fight Night 154. However, on June 5, 2019, it was reported that Stamann pulled out of the event due to an injury, and he was replaced by John Lineker. In turn, Lineker was pulled from the bout for an undisclosed reason. Font, in turn, would be removed from the card.

Font faced Ricky Simón at UFC on ESPN 7 on December 7, 2019. He won the fight via unanimous decision. This fight earned him the Fight of the Night award.

Font faced Marlon Moraes on December 19, 2020, at UFC Fight Night 183. Font won the fight via technical knockout in round one. This win earned him a Performance of the Night award.

Font faced Cody Garbrandt on May 22, 2021, at UFC Fight Night 188. He won the bout by unanimous decision.

Font faced former WEC and UFC featherweight champion José Aldo in the headliner of UFC on ESPN 31 on December 4, 2021. After being knocked down multiple times, he lost the fight via unanimous decision.

Font faced Marlon Vera on April 30, 2022, at UFC on ESPN 35. At the weigh-ins, Font weighed in at 138.5 pounds, two and half pounds over the bantamweight non-title fight limit. The bout proceeded at a catchweight with Font forfeiting 20% of his purse to Vera. Despite significantly outstriking Vera, Font was dropped in three straight rounds and lost the fight via unanimous decision. The fight also earned the Fight of the Night award, although Font was deemed ineligible for a bonus due missing weight and his share went to Vera. Font set bantamweight records for significant and total strikes landed and attempted in a fight; It also had the second-most combined strikes landed of any UFC fight.

Font faced Adrian Yañez on April 8, 2023, at UFC 287 He won the bout via TKO in the first round. This win earned him the Performance of the Night award.

Font was scheduled to face Song Yadong in a bout on the main card of UFC 292. However Font was selected to replace Umar Nurmagomedov who pulled out of his bout against Cory Sandhagen in the main event at UFC on ESPN 50 on August 5, 2023. He lost the fight via unanimous decision.

Font faced former UFC Flyweight champion Deiveson Figueiredo on December 2, 2023, at UFC on ESPN 52. He lost the fight via unanimous decision.

Font faced Kyler Phillips on October 19, 2024 at UFC Fight Night 245. He won the fight by unanimous decision.

Font was scheduled to face former two-time UFC Bantamweight Champion Dominick Cruz on February 22, 2025, at UFC Fight Night 252. However, Cruz withdrew from the fight due to an injury and was replaced by undefeated prospect Jean Matsumoto in a catchweight bout of 140 pounds. Font defeated Matsumoto by split decision.

Font was scheduled to face Raul Rosas Jr. on September 13, 2025 at UFC Fight Night 259. However, Rosas Jr. had to withdraw due to an injury and was replaced by David Martínez. Font lost the fight by unanimous decision.

The re-scheduled bout between Font and Rosas Jr. took place on March 7, 2026, at UFC 326. He lost the fight by unanimous decision.

== Personal life ==
Font is of Puerto Rican descent.

Font and his spouse have a daughter (born 2022).

== Championships and accomplishments ==
- Ultimate Fighting Championship
  - Performance of the Night (Four times) vs. George Roop, Douglas Silva de Andrade, Marlon Moraes, and Adrian Yañez
  - Fight of the Night (Two times) vs. Ricky Simón and Marlon Vera
    - Tied (Marlon Vera, Davey Grant & Song Yadong) for fourth most Post-Fight bonuses in UFC Bantamweight division history (6)
  - Tied (Marlon Vera, Adrian Yañez & Song Yadong) for third most knockouts in UFC Bantamweight division history (6)
  - Tied (Urijah Faber, Sean O'Malley & Song Yadong) for third most finishes in UFC Bantamweight division history (7)
  - Tied (Urijah Faber) for sixth most wins in UFC Bantamweight division history (11)
  - Third most bouts in UFC Bantamweight division history (19)
  - Fifth most significant strikes landed in UFC Bantamweight division history (1317)
  - Fifth most total fight time in UFC Bantamweight division history (3:58:06)
- CES MMA
  - Featherweight Championship (One time; former)
    - One successful title defense

== Mixed martial arts record ==
Professional record breakdown
32 matches	22 wins	10 losses
By knockout	9	0
By submission	4	1
By decision	9	9

Res.	Record	Opponent	Method	Event	Date	Round	Time	Location	Notes
Loss	22–10	Raul Rosas Jr.	Decision (unanimous)	UFC 326	March 7, 2026	3	5:00	Las Vegas, Nevada, United States	
Loss	22–9	David Martínez	Decision (unanimous)	UFC Fight Night: Lopes vs. Silva	September 13, 2025	3	5:00	San Antonio, Texas, United States	
Win	22–8	Jean Matsumoto	Decision (split)	UFC Fight Night: Cejudo vs. Song	February 22, 2025	3	5:00	Seattle, Washington, United States	Catchweight (140 lb) bout.
Win	21–8	Kyler Phillips	Decision (unanimous)	UFC Fight Night: Hernandez vs. Pereira	October 19, 2024	3	5:00	Las Vegas, Nevada, United States	
Loss	20–8	Deiveson Figueiredo	Decision (unanimous)	UFC on ESPN: Dariush vs. Tsarukyan	December 2, 2023	3	5:00	Austin, Texas, United States	
Loss	20–7	Cory Sandhagen	Decision (unanimous)	UFC on ESPN: Sandhagen vs. Font	August 5, 2023	5	5:00	Nashville, Tennessee, United States	Catchweight (140 lb) bout.
Win	20–6	Adrian Yañez	TKO (punches)	UFC 287	April 8, 2023	1	2:57	Miami, Florida, United States	Performance of the Night.
Loss	19–6	Marlon Vera	Decision (unanimous)	UFC on ESPN: Font vs. Vera	April 30, 2022	5	5:00	Las Vegas, Nevada, United States	Catchweight (138.5 lb) bout; Font missed weight. Fight of the Night.
Loss	19–5	José Aldo	Decision (unanimous)	UFC on ESPN: Font vs. Aldo	December 4, 2021	5	5:00	Las Vegas, Nevada, United States	
Win	19–4	Cody Garbrandt	Decision (unanimous)	UFC Fight Night: Font vs. Garbrandt	May 22, 2021	5	5:00	Las Vegas, Nevada, United States	
Win	18–4	Marlon Moraes	TKO (elbow and punches)	UFC Fight Night: Thompson vs. Neal	December 19, 2020	1	3:47	Las Vegas, Nevada, United States	Performance of the Night.
Win	17–4	Ricky Simón	Decision (unanimous)	UFC on ESPN: Overeem vs. Rozenstruik	December 7, 2019	3	5:00	Washington, D.C., United States	Fight of the Night.
Win	16–4	Sergio Pettis	Decision (unanimous)	UFC on Fox: Lee vs. Iaquinta 2	December 15, 2018	3	5:00	Milwaukee, Wisconsin, United States	
Loss	15–4	Raphael Assunção	Decision (unanimous)	UFC 226	July 7, 2018	3	5:00	Las Vegas, Nevada, United States	
Win	15–3	Thomas Almeida	TKO (head kick and punches)	UFC 220	January 20, 2018	2	2:24	Boston, Massachusetts, United States	
Loss	14–3	Pedro Munhoz	Submission (guillotine choke)	UFC Fight Night: Brunson vs. Machida	October 28, 2017	1	4:03	São Paulo, Brazil	
Win	14–2	Douglas Silva de Andrade	Submission (guillotine choke)	UFC 213	July 8, 2017	2	4:36	Las Vegas, Nevada, United States	Performance of the Night.
Win	13–2	Matt Schnell	KO (knee and punches)	The Ultimate Fighter: Tournament of Champions Finale	December 3, 2016	1	3:47	Las Vegas, Nevada, United States	
Loss	12–2	John Lineker	Decision (unanimous)	UFC 198	May 14, 2016	3	5:00	Curitiba, Brazil	
Win	12–1	Joey Gomez	TKO (punches)	UFC Fight Night: Dillashaw vs. Cruz	January 17, 2016	2	4:13	Boston, Massachusetts, United States	
Win	11–1	George Roop	KO (punches)	UFC 175	July 5, 2014	1	2:19	Las Vegas, Nevada, United States	Bantamweight debut. Performance of the Night.
Win	10–1	Tristen Johnson	KO (punch)	CES MMA 23	April 25, 2014	1	2:48	Lincoln, Rhode Island, United States	
Win	9–1	Ahsan Abdullah	Submission (brabo choke)	CES MMA 21	January 24, 2014	1	3:48	Lincoln, Rhode Island, United States	
Win	8–1	Matt Dimarcantonio	Decision (unanimous)	CES MMA 20	December 6, 2013	3	5:00	Lincoln, Rhode Island, United States	Defended the CES MMA Featherweight Championship.
Win	7–1	Chris Foster	TKO (punches)	CES MMA 18	August 9, 2013	1	4:01	Lincoln, Rhode Island, United States	Won the inaugural CES MMA Featherweight Championship.
Win	6–1	Lucas Cruz	Decision (unanimous)	CES MMA 16	April 12, 2013	3	5:00	Lincoln, Rhode Island, United States	Catchweight (150 lb) bout.
Win	5–1	Saul Almeida	Decision (unanimous)	CES MMA 15	February 1, 2013	3	5:00	Lincoln, Rhode Island, United States	
Win	4–1	Brandon Fleming	Decision (unanimous)	Cage Titans 11	October 12, 2012	3	5:00	Plymouth, Massachusetts, United States	
Win	3–1	Lionel Young	Submission (guillotine choke)	Cage Fighting Xtreme 21	August 11, 2012	3	0:58	Brockton, Massachusetts, United States	
Win	2–1	Thane Stimson	KO (punch)	Reality Fighting: Mohegan Fight Night 6	June 2, 2012	1	0:43	Uncasville, Connecticut, United States	Featherweight debut.
Loss	1–1	Desmond Green	Decision (unanimous)	Premier FC 8	April 1, 2012	3	5:00	Holyoke, Massachusetts, United States	
Win	1–0	Matt Tuthill	Submission (armbar)	Premier FC 7	December 3, 2011	1	2:32	Amherst, Massachusetts, United States	Lightweight debut.

== See also ==
- List of current UFC fighters
- List of male mixed martial artists
