= UFC Fight Night: Iaquinta vs. Cowboy =

UFC mixed martial arts event in 2019

- The poster for UFC Fight Night: Iaquinta vs. Cowboy
- Promotion: Ultimate Fighting Championship
- Date: May 4, 2019
- Venue: Canadian Tire Centre
- City: Ottawa, Ontario, Canada
- Attendance: 10,960
- Total gate: $807,000

Event chronology
UFC Fight Night: Jacaré vs. Hermansson	UFC Fight Night: Iaquinta vs. Cowboy	UFC 237: Namajunas vs. Andrade

UFC Fight Night: Iaquinta vs. Cowboy (also known as UFC Fight Night 151 or UFC on ESPN+ 9) was a mixed martial arts event produced by the Ultimate Fighting Championship held on May 4, 2019 at the Canadian Tire Centre in Ottawa, Ontario, Canada.

== Background ==
The event was the promotion's second visit to Ottawa, following UFC Fight Night: MacDonald vs. Thompson which took place in June 2016 at TD Place Arena.

A lightweight bout between Al Iaquinta and former UFC Lightweight Championship challenger Donald Cerrone served as the event headliner.

A heavyweight bout between Walt Harris and Aleksei Oleinik was originally scheduled to take place at this event. However on April 3, it was announced that Oleinik would be replacing former Bellator Heavyweight Champion Alexander Volkov against the 2010 K-1 World Grand Prix Champion and former Strikeforce Heavyweight Champion Alistair Overeem in the main event of UFC on ESPN+ 7. He was replaced by Sergey Spivak.

Leah Letson was expected to face Sarah Moras at the event. However, Letson was removed from the fight in early April for an unspecified medical issue and was replaced by Macy Chiasson.

Brian Kelleher was expected to face Mitch Gagnon at the event. However, Kelleher pulled out of the fight on April 10 citing injury and was replaced by promotional newcomer Cole Smith.

A welterweight bout between Siyar Bahadurzada and Nordine Taleb was scheduled to take place at the event. However on April 24, it was reported that Bahadurzada pulled out of the bout citing injury and was replaced by newcomer Kyle Prepolec.

== Results ==
Main Card (ESPN+)
Weight class				Method	Round	Time	Notes
Lightweight	Donald Cerrone	def.	Al Iaquinta	Decision (unanimous) (49–45, 49–45, 49–46)	5	5:00
Middleweight	Derek Brunson	def.	Elias Theodorou	Decision (unanimous) (29–28, 29–28, 30–27)	3	5:00
Featherweight	Shane Burgos	def.	Cub Swanson	Decision (split) (30–27, 27–30, 29–28)	3	5:00
Bantamweight	Merab Dvalishvili	def.	Brad Katona	Decision (unanimous) (30–27, 30–27, 30–27)	3	5:00
Heavyweight	Walt Harris	def.	Serghei Spivac	TKO (knees and punches)	1	0:50
Middleweight	Andrew Sanchez	def.	Marc-André Barriault	Decision (unanimous) (29–28, 29–28, 29–28)	3	5:00
Preliminary Card (ESPN+)
Women's Bantamweight	Macy Chiasson	def.	Sarah Moras	TKO (punches)	2	2:22
Bantamweight	Vince Morales	def.	Aiemann Zahabi	Decision (unanimous) (29–28, 29–28, 29–28)	3	5:00
Welterweight	Nordine Taleb	def.	Kyle Prepolec	Decision (unanimous) (30–27, 30–27, 30–27)	3	5:00
Featherweight	Matt Sayles	def.	Kyle Nelson	Submission (arm-triangle choke)	3	3:16
Heavyweight	Arjan Bhullar	def.	Juan Adams	Decision (unanimous) (29–28, 29–28, 30–27)	3	5:00
Bantamweight	Cole Smith	def.	Mitch Gagnon	Decision (unanimous) (29–28, 29–28, 30–27)	3	5:00

== Bonus awards ==
The following fighters received $50,000 bonuses:

- Fight of the Night: Donald Cerrone vs. Al Iaquinta
- Performance of the Night: Walt Harris and Macy Chiasson

== See also ==
- List of UFC events
- 2019 in UFC
- List of current UFC fighters
