= Hunter Azure =

American mixed martial artist

- Born: March 2, 1992 (age 34); Poplar, Montana, U.S.
- Height: 5 ft 8 in (173 cm)
- Weight: 135 lb (61 kg; 9 st 9 lb)
- Division: Bantamweight
- Reach: 70.5 in (179 cm)
- Fighting out of: Phoenix, Arizona, U.S.
- Team: Fight Ready
- Wrestling: NAIA Wrestling
- Years active: 2017–present

Mixed martial arts record
- Total: 18
- Wins: 13
- By knockout: 4
- By submission: 2
- By decision: 7
- Losses: 5
- By knockout: 2
- By submission: 2
- By decision: 1

Other information
- Mixed martial arts record from Sherdog

Hunter Azure (born March 2, 1992) is an American professional mixed martial artist who competed in the bantamweight division of the Ultimate Fighting Championship (UFC).

== Background ==
Azure was born on the Fort Peck Indian Reservation in Poplar, Montana, and went on to attend Poplar High School, where he was a four-time Class-B MHSA state champion as a wrestler. He then wrestled at Montana State University–Northern, where he earned a degree in industrial technology.

== Mixed martial arts career ==
=== Early career ===
Azure spent most of his early career in regional Western American promotions, most notably fighting in the Legacy Fighting Alliance. During this time he compiled an undefeated 6–0 record.

=== Dana White's Contender Series ===
He was eventually invited to the Dana White's Contender Series 19. On July 9, 2019, he faced fellow undefeated prospect Chris Ocon, defeating him via unanimous decision and in the process gaining a UFC contract.

=== Ultimate Fighting Championship ===
Azure made his promotional debut against The Ultimate Fighter 27 Featherweight Tournament winner Brad Katona on September 14, 2019, at UFC Fight Night: Cowboy vs. Gaethje. He won the bout by unanimous decision.

Azure was scheduled to face Umar Nurmagomedov on April 18, 2020, at UFC 249. However, the event was then postponed.

Azure faced Brian Kelleher on May 13, 2020, at UFC Fight Night: Smith vs. Teixeira. He lost the fight via knockout in the second round. This bout earned both participants the Fight of the Night award.

Azure faced Cole Smith on September 5, 2020, at UFC Fight Night: Overeem vs. Sakai. He won by unanimous decision.

Azure faced Jack Shore on April 10, 2021, at UFC on ABC: Vettori vs. Holland. He lost the bout via split decision.

On March 1, 2022, it was announced that Azure was released from UFC.

=== Post UFC ===
Azure made his first appearance post release at iKON FC 2 on March 18, 2022, against Keith Richardson. He lost the bout via rear-naked choke in the second round.

Azure faced Ben Hollier at Fusion Fight League: Boise on October 15, 2022, winning the bout via unanimous decision.

Azure next faced Amun Cosme at United Fight League 4 for the vacant UFL Bantamweight title on April 17, 2024. He would win the fight via second-round technical knockout.

Azure would make his first defence of the UFL Bantamweight title against fellow UFC veteran Vince Morales at United Fight League 5 on August 30, 2024. He would lose the fight via submission in the third round succumbing to a Peruvian necktie.

=== The Ultimate Fighter 31 ===
In mid March 2023, it was announced that Azure would be competing in the thirty-first season of The Ultimate Fighter.

In the quarterfinal Azure faced Rico DiSciullo. after a strong performance in the first round, he lost the fight in the second round by knock out.

== Personal life ==
Hunter and his fiancée Sage have a son. He is the son of Howard and Deb Azure and has three siblings. He is a native American, being an enrolled member of the Assiniboine and Sioux people on the Fort Peck Indian Reservation.

== Championships and accomplishments ==
=== Mixed martial arts ===
- Ultimate Fighting Championship
  - Fight of the Night (One time) vs. Brian Kelleher
- United Fight League
  - UFL Bantamweight Championship (One time)

== Mixed martial arts record ==
Professional record breakdown
18 matches	13 wins	5 losses
By knockout	4	2
By submission	2	2
By decision	7	1

Res.	Record	Opponent	Method	Event	Date	Round	Time	Location	Notes
Loss	13–5	Khaseyn Shaykhaev	TKO (punches)	Fusion Fight League: Holloway vs. Wagner	April 11, 2025	3	0:07	Great Falls, Montana, United States	Return to Featherweight.
Win	13–4	Alvaro Quiroga Arellano	Decision (unanimous)	United Fight League 6	May 2, 2025	3	5:00	Scottsdale, Arizona, United States	
Win	12–4	Joel Haro	Submission (arm-triangle choke)	Fierce FC 36	December 13, 2024	3	3:30	Salt Lake City, Utah, United States	Won the vacant Fierce FC Bantamweight Championship.
Loss	11–4	Vince Morales	Submission (Peruvian necktie)	United Fight League 5	August 30, 2024	3	4:06	Chandler, Arizona, United States	Lost the UFL Bantamweight Championship.
Win	11–3	Amun Cosme	TKO (punch)	United Fight League 4	April 17, 2024	2	2:42	Chandler, Arizona, United States	Won the UFL Bantamweight Championship.
Win	10–3	Ben Hollier	Decision (unanimous)	Fusion Fight League: Boise	October 15, 2022	3	5:00	Boise, Idaho, United States	
Loss	9–3	Keith Richardson	Submission (rear-naked choke)	Jorge Masvidal's iKon FC 2	March 18, 2022	2	2:05	Miami, Florida, United States	
Loss	9–2	Jack Shore	Decision (split)	UFC on ABC: Vettori vs. Holland	April 10, 2021	3	5:00	Las Vegas, Nevada, United States	
Win	9–1	Cole Smith	Decision (unanimous)	UFC Fight Night: Overeem vs. Sakai	September 5, 2020	3	5:00	Las Vegas, Nevada, United States	
Loss	8–1	Brian Kelleher	KO (punches)	UFC Fight Night: Smith vs. Teixeira	May 13, 2020	2	3:40	Jacksonville, Florida, United States	Featherweight bout. Fight of the Night.
Win	8–0	Brad Katona	Decision (unanimous)	UFC Fight Night: Cowboy vs. Gaethje	September 14, 2019	3	5:00	Vancouver, British Columbia, Canada	
Win	7–0	Chris Ocon	Decision (unanimous)	Dana White's Contender Series 19	July 9, 2019	3	5:00	Las Vegas, Nevada, United States	
Win	6–0	LJ Schulz	Decision (unanimous)	LFA 66	May 10, 2019	3	5:00	West Valley City, Utah, United States	
Win	5–0	Jaime Hernandez	TKO (kick to the body and punches)	LFA 59	February 1, 2019	1	2:15	Phoenix, Arizona, United States	
Win	4–0	A.J. Robb	Decision (unanimous)	LFA 53	November 9, 2018	3	5:00	Phoenix, Arizona, United States	Bantamweight debut.
Win	3–0	Cameron Thurgood	TKO (punches)	Golden Fights: Cage Wars 33	August 4, 2018	1	1:01	Grand Junction, Colorado, United States	
Win	2–0	Joshua Sandvig	Submission (rear-naked choke)	Fusion Fight League: Lights Out at the Dome 2	July 14, 2018	2	4:49	Havre, Montana, United States	Won the FFL Featherweight Championship.
Win	1–0	Jon Lorens	TKO (punches)	Jeremy Horn's Elite Fight Night 29	August 11, 2017	1	2:08	Ogden, Utah, United States	Featherweight debut.

== Mixed martial arts exhibition record ==
Exhibition record breakdown		
1 match	0 wins	1 loss
By knockout	0	1

Res.	Record	Opponent	Method	Event	Date	Round	Time	Location	Notes
Loss	0–1	Rico DiSciullo	TKO (punches)	The Ultimate Fighter: Team McGregor vs. Team Chandler	Jul 18, 2023 (airdate)	2	1:07	Las Vegas, Nevada, United States	The Ultimate Fighter 31 Quarterfinal round.

== See also ==
- List of male mixed martial artists
