= UFC Fight Night: Overeem vs. Sakai =

UFC mixed martial arts event in 2020

- The poster for UFC Fight Night: Overeem vs. Sakai
- Promotion: Ultimate Fighting Championship
- Date: September 5, 2020
- Venue: UFC Apex
- City: Enterprise, Nevada, United States
- Attendance: None (behind closed doors)

Event chronology
UFC Fight Night: Smith vs. Rakić	UFC Fight Night: Overeem vs. Sakai	UFC Fight Night: Waterson vs. Hill

UFC Fight Night: Overeem vs. Sakai (also known as UFC Fight Night 176, UFC on ESPN+ 34 and UFC Vegas 9) was a mixed martial arts event produced by the Ultimate Fighting Championship that took place on September 5, 2020, at the UFC Apex facility in Enterprise, Nevada, part of the Las Vegas Metropolitan Area, United States.

== Background ==
A heavyweight bout between the 2010 K-1 World Grand Prix Champion, former Strikeforce Heavyweight Champion and UFC Heavyweight Championship challenger Alistair Overeem and Augusto Sakai served as the event headliner.

A women's bantamweight bout between former UFC Women's Flyweight Champion Nicco Montaño and Julia Avila was originally scheduled for UFC Fight Night: Lewis vs. Oleinik. However, due to Montaño's coach John Wood testing positive for COVID-19, the bout was rescheduled for this event instead. In turn, it was announced on August 29 that Montaño herself tested positive for the disease and the bout was pushed back to UFC on ESPN: Holm vs. Aldana in October.

A women's flyweight bout between Maryna Moroz and Montana De La Rosa was scheduled for this event. However, Moroz was forced to withdraw as she was unable to secure a visa due to travel restrictions related to the COVID-19 pandemic and was replaced by Viviane Araújo.

A lightweight bout between Khama Worthy and Ottman Azaitar was previously scheduled to take place earlier this year at UFC 249. However, the event was cancelled in early April due to the COVID-19 pandemic. The pairing was rescheduled and took place at this event. In turn, the pair was moved to UFC Fight Night: Waterson vs. Hill for undisclosed reasons.

A women's flyweight bout between Mayra Bueno Silva and Mara Romero Borella was briefly linked to this event. However, promotion officials rescheduled the pairing for undisclosed reasons and the bout was expected to take place two weeks later at UFC Fight Night: Covington vs. Woodley.

A light heavyweight bout between former interim UFC Light Heavyweight Championship challenger Ovince Saint Preux and Alonzo Menifield was scheduled to take place two weeks earlier at UFC on ESPN: Munhoz vs. Edgar. However, the bout was removed from the card on the day of the event as Saint Preux tested positive for COVID-19. In turn, the pairing was targeted for this event.

A women's bantamweight bout between Macy Chiasson and Sijara Eubanks was scheduled for this event. However, Chiasson pulled out of the fight for undisclosed medical reasons and was replaced by Karol Rosa. Rosa pulled out on September 3 due to complications related to her weight cut. Eubanks is expected to compete a week later at UFC Fight Night: Waterson vs. Hill against Julia Avila.

A bantamweight bout between Ricky Simon and Brian Kelleher was scheduled for this event, but Simon's cornerman tested positive for COVID-19 and he was forced to withdraw from the event. He was replaced by promotional newcomer Kevin Natividad and they were expected to meet in a featherweight bout. In turn, Natividad was pulled from the matchup on the day of the event due to undisclosed reasons and replaced by fellow newcomer Ray Rodriguez, who weighed in as a backup on Friday.

A few hours before the event, American Top Team teammates Thiago Moisés and Marcos Rogério de Lima pulled out of their respective bouts at lightweight against Jalin Turner and heavyweight against Alexander Romanov due to testing positive for COVID-19, thus cancelling both matchups.

Due to the many unexpected changes and last minute cancellations, the event took place with only seven bouts on the card, making it the smallest UFC event since The Ultimate Fighter 2 Finale in November 2005.

== Event ==
All the fights were on the main card due to the many cancellations and changes. The card consisted of 7 mixed martial arts bouts, which were scheduled for three five-minute rounds, except for the main event fight between Overeem and Sakai, which would consist of five five-minute rounds. The fights were held behind closed doors due to the COVID-19 pandemic at the UFC Apex in Las Vegas, and the event was broadcast on ESPN+.

== Results ==
Main card (ESPN+)
Weight class				Method	Round	Time	Notes
Heavyweight	Alistair Overeem	def.	Augusto Sakai	TKO (elbows and punches)	5	0:26
Light Heavyweight	Ovince Saint Preux	def.	Alonzo Menifield	KO (punch)	2	4:07
Welterweight	Michel Pereira	def.	Zelim Imadaev	Submission (rear-naked choke)	3	4:39
Middleweight	André Muniz	def.	Bartosz Fabiński	Submission (armbar)	1	2:42
Featherweight	Brian Kelleher	def.	Ray Rodriguez	Submission (guillotine choke)	1	0:39
Women's Flyweight	Viviane Araújo	def.	Montana De La Rosa	Decision (unanimous) (30–27, 30–27, 29–28)	3	5:00
Bantamweight	Hunter Azure	def.	Cole Smith	Decision (unanimous) (29–28, 29–28, 29–28)	3	5:00

== Bonus awards ==
The following fighters received $50,000 bonuses.

- Fight of the Night: No bonus awarded.
- Performance of the Night: Ovince Saint Preux, Michel Pereira, André Muniz, and Brian Kelleher

== See also ==
- List of UFC events
- List of current UFC fighters
- 2020 in UFC
