= Song Yadong =

Chinese mixed martial artist (born 1997)

- Born: December 2, 1997 (age 28); Harbin, Heilongjiang, China
- Native name: 宋亚东
- Other names: The Kung Fu Kid
- Height: 5 ft 8 in (1.73 m)
- Weight: 135 lb (61 kg; 9.6 st)
- Division: Bantamweight
- Reach: 67 in (170 cm)
- Fighting out of: Heilongjiang, China
- Team: Enbo Fight Club (former); Team Alpha Male (2017–present)
- Years active: 2013–present

Mixed martial arts record
- Total: 35
- Wins: 24
- By knockout: 10
- By submission: 4
- By decision: 10
- Losses: 9
- By knockout: 2
- By decision: 6
- By disqualification: 1
- Draws: 1
- No contests: 1

Other information
- Mixed martial arts record from Sherdog

Song Yadong (Chinese: 宋亚东; pinyin: Sòng Yàdōng; born December 2, 1997) is a Chinese professional mixed martial artist who currently competes in the Bantamweight division of the Ultimate Fighting Championship (UFC). As of September 5, 2026, he is #2 in the Meta UFC bantamweight rankings.

== Background ==
Song began training mixed martial arts at the age of 13, making his professional debut before his sixteenth birthday.

== Mixed martial arts career ==
=== Ultimate Fighting Championship ===
==== 2017 ====
In November 2017, it was announced that Song Yadong would step in on short notice, to fight the first ever Indian-born fighter in the UFC and fellow debutante, Baharat Kandare at UFC Fight Night 122 on November 25, 2017 in Shanghai, China. He won the fight via submission due to a guillotine choke in the first round. This fight earned him his first Performance of the Night award.

==== 2018 ====
Song faced Felipe Arantes on June 23, 2018, at UFC Fight Night 132 in Singapore. He won the fight via technical knockout in the second round. This win earned him another Performance of the Night bonus.

Song was expected to face Frankie Saenz on 24 November 2018 at UFC Fight Night 141. However, it was reported on November 7, 2018 that he pulled out of the event due to injury and he was replaced by newcomer Vince Morales. He won the fight via unanimous decision.

==== 2019 ====
Song was scheduled to face Alejandro Pérez on March 2, 2019 at UFC 235. However, it was reported on January 11, 2019 that he pulled out due to an undisclosed reason. He was replaced by Cody Stamann. The bout with Pérez was rescheduled and eventually took place on July 6, 2019 at UFC 239. Song won the fight via knockout in the first round. This win earned him the Performance of the Night award.

Song faced Cody Stamann on December 7, 2019, at UFC on ESPN 7. After three round fight, the fight ended with a majority draw.

==== 2020 ====
Song faced Marlon Vera in a featherweight bout on May 16, 2020, at UFC on ESPN 8. He won the fight via unanimous decision. Both participants earned the Fight of the Night award.

==== 2021 ====
Song faced Kyler Phillips on March 6, 2021, at UFC 259. He lost the bout via unanimous decision.

Song faced Casey Kenney on August 7, 2021, at UFC 265. He won the fight via split decision.

Song faced Julio Arce on November 13, 2021, at UFC Fight Night 197. He won the fight via technical knockout in round two.

==== 2022 ====
Song faced Marlon Moraes on March 12, 2022, at UFC Fight Night 203. He won the fight via knockout in round one. This win earned him the Performance of the Night award.

Song faced Cory Sandhagen on September 17, 2022, at UFC Fight Night 210. He lost the fight via technical knockout after a doctor stopped the fight.

==== 2023 ====
Song was scheduled to face Ricky Simón on April 22, 2023, at UFC Fight Night 222. However, the bout was instead postponed to UFC on ESPN: Song vs. Simón as the headliner. He eventually won the fight via technical knockout in the fifth round. This win earned him his the Performance of the Night bonus award.

Song was scheduled to headline UFC Fight Night 233 against Petr Yan on December 9, 2023. However, Yan withdrew from the bout citing an injury and was replaced by Chris Gutiérrez. Song won the fight via unanimous decision.

==== 2024 ====
Song faced former UFC Bantamweight champion Petr Yan on March 9, 2024, at UFC 299. He lost the bout by unanimous decision.

Song was reportedly scheduled to face Umar Nurmagomedov in the main event on December 14, 2024 at UFC on ESPN 63. However, the bout was scrapped due to Yadong's injury.

==== 2025 ====
Song faced former UFC Flyweight and Bantamweight champion Henry Cejudo in the main event on February 22, 2025, at UFC Fight Night 252. As a result of an eyepoke by Song rendering Cejudo unable to continue, Song won the fight by technical decision after the bout was stopped at the beginning of the fourth round.

==== 2026 ====
Song faced former UFC Bantamweight Champion Sean O'Malley on January 24, 2026 at UFC 324. He lost the bout by unanimous decision. 9 out of 21 media outlets scored the bout for Song.

Song faced former two-time UFC Flyweight Champion Deiveson Figueiredo on May 30, 2026 in the main event of UFC Fight Night 277. He won by second round submission via guillotine choke. This fight earned him a $100,000 Performance of the Night award.

Song faced Umar Nurmagomedov in the main event on August 30, 2026, at UFC Fight Night 286. He won the fight via knockout in the second round. This fight earned him a $100,000 Performance of the Night award.

== Personal life ==
Song and his wife Daisy have a son.

== Championships and accomplishments ==
=== Mixed martial arts ===
- Ultimate Fighting Championship
  - Fight of the Night (One time) vs. Marlon Vera
  - Performance of the Night (Seven times) vs. Bharat Khandare, Felipe Arantes, Alejandro Pérez, Marlon Moraes, Ricky Simón, Deiveson Figueiredo and Umar Nurmagomedov
    - Tied (Donald Cerrone, Ovince Saint Preux, Tom Aspinall, Carlos Prates & Conor McGregor) for fourth most Performance of the Night awards in UFC history (7)
    - Tied (Rob Font, Davey Grant & Marlon Vera) for fourth most Post-Fight bonuses in UFC Bantamweight division history (6)
  - Tied (Urijah Faber, Rob Font & Sean O'Malley) for third most finishes in UFC Bantamweight division history (7)
  - Tied (Marlon Vera, Adrian Yañez & Rob Font) for third most knockouts in UFC Bantamweight division history (6)

=== Sanda ===
- 2011 Hebei Provincial Sanda Championship − 1st place, 60 kg

=== Muay Thai ===
- 2011 National Muay Thai Championship − 5th place

=== Grappling ===
- 2012 Shanghai Jiu-Jitsu Open − 4th place

== Mixed martial arts record ==
Professional record breakdown
35 matches	24 wins	9 losses
By knockout	10	2
By submission	4	0
By decision	10	6
By disqualification	0	1
Draws	1	
No contests	1	

Res.	Record	Opponent	Method	Event	Date	Round	Time	Location	Notes
Win	24–9–1 (1)	Umar Nurmagomedov	KO (punch)	UFC Fight Night: Nurmagomedov vs. Song	August 29, 2026	2	1:48	Shanghai, China	Performance of the Night.
Win	23–9–1 (1)	Deiveson Figueiredo	Submission (guillotine choke)	UFC Fight Night: Song vs. Figueiredo	May 30, 2026	2	4:42	Macau SAR, China	Performance of the Night.
Loss	22–9–1 (1)	Sean O'Malley	Decision (unanimous)	UFC 324	January 24, 2026	3	5:00	Las Vegas, Nevada, United States	
Win	22–8–1 (1)	Henry Cejudo	Technical Decision (unanimous)	UFC Fight Night: Cejudo vs. Song	February 22, 2025	3	5:00	Seattle, Washington, United States	An eye injury due to an accidental eye poke rendered Cejudo unable to continue.
Loss	21–8–1 (1)	Petr Yan	Decision (unanimous)	UFC 299	March 9, 2024	3	5:00	Miami, Florida, United States	
Win	21–7–1 (1)	Chris Gutiérrez	Decision (unanimous)	UFC Fight Night: Song vs. Gutiérrez	December 9, 2023	5	5:00	Las Vegas, Nevada, United States	
Win	20–7–1 (1)	Ricky Simón	TKO (punches)	UFC on ESPN: Song vs. Simón	April 29, 2023	5	1:10	Las Vegas, Nevada, United States	Performance of the Night.
Loss	19–7–1 (1)	Cory Sandhagen	TKO (doctor stoppage)	UFC Fight Night: Sandhagen vs. Song	September 17, 2022	4	5:00	Las Vegas, Nevada, United States	
Win	19–6–1 (1)	Marlon Moraes	KO (punches)	UFC Fight Night: Santos vs. Ankalaev	March 12, 2022	1	2:06	Las Vegas, Nevada, United States	Performance of the Night.
Win	18–6–1 (1)	Julio Arce	TKO (head kick and punches)	UFC Fight Night: Holloway vs. Rodríguez	November 13, 2021	2	1:35	Las Vegas, Nevada, United States	
Win	17–6–1 (1)	Casey Kenney	Decision (split)	UFC 265	August 7, 2021	3	5:00	Houston, Texas, United States	
Loss	16–6–1 (1)	Kyler Phillips	Decision (unanimous)	UFC 259	March 6, 2021	3	5:00	Las Vegas, Nevada, United States	
Win	16–5–1 (1)	Marlon Vera	Decision (unanimous)	UFC on ESPN: Overeem vs. Harris	May 16, 2020	3	5:00	Jacksonville, Florida, United States	Featherweight bout. Fight of the Night.
Draw	15–5–1 (1)	Cody Stamann	Draw (majority)	UFC on ESPN: Overeem vs. Rozenstruik	December 7, 2019	3	5:00	Washington, D.C., United States	Song was deducted a point in round 1 due to an illegal knee
Win	15–5 (1)	Alejandro Pérez	KO (punch)	UFC 239	July 6, 2019	1	2:04	Las Vegas, Nevada, United States	Performance of the Night.
Win	14–5 (1)	Vince Morales	Decision (unanimous)	UFC Fight Night: Blaydes vs. Ngannou 2	November 24, 2018	3	5:00	Beijing, China	
Win	13–5 (1)	Felipe Arantes	KO (elbow)	UFC Fight Night: Cowboy vs. Edwards	June 23, 2018	2	4:59	Kallang, Singapore	Return to Bantamweight. Performance of the Night.
Win	12–5 (1)	Bharat Khandare	Submission (guillotine choke)	UFC Fight Night: Bisping vs. Gastelum	November 25, 2017	1	4:16	Shanghai, China	Featherweight bout. Performance of the Night.
Win	11–5 (1)	Makoto Yoshida	TKO (knees to the body and punches)	WLF W.A.R.S. 18	October 27, 2017	1	1:05	Maerkang, China	Lightweight debut.
Win	10–5 (1)	Edgars Skrivers	Decision (unanimous)	Kunlun Fight MMA 10	April 6, 2017	3	5:00	Beijing, China	
Loss	9–5 (1)	Renat Ondar	Decision (unanimous)	WLF World Championship	January 8, 2017	5	5:00	Zhengzhou, China	
Win	9–4 (1)	Shamil Nasrudinov	Submission (rear-naked choke)	WLF W.A.R.S. 10	November 26, 2016	2	3:19	Zhengzhou, China	
Loss	8–4 (1)	Renat Ondar	Decision (unanimous)	WLF E.P.I.C. 9	October 24, 2016	3	5:00	Zhengzhou, China	
Win	8–3 (1)	Vachagan Nikogosyan	TKO (punches)	WLF E.P.I.C. 6	July 23, 2016	1	3:12	Zhengzhou, China	
Loss	7–3 (1)	Alexey Polpudnikov	KO (punch)	Kunlun Fight 44	May 14, 2016	2	0:50	Khabarovsk, Russia	Return to Featherweight.
Win	7–2 (1)	Artak Nazaryan	KO (punch to the body)	WLF E.P.I.C. 2	March 13, 2016	2	0:59	Henan, China	
Win	6–2 (1)	Aleksander Zaitsev	Decision (unanimous)	WLF E.P.I.C. 1	January 13, 2016	3	5:00	Zhengzhou, China	Return to Bantamweight.
Loss	5–2 (1)	Giovanni Moljo	DQ (groin kicks)	Road to M-1: China	July 25, 2015	2	5:00	Chengdu, China	
Win	5–1 (1)	Ok Rae-yoon	KO (punch)	WBK 3: Day 2	April 5, 2015	1	1:21	Ningbo, China	Featherweight debut.
Loss	4–1 (1)	Ji Xian	Decision (unanimous)	ONE: Dynasty of Champions	December 19, 2014	3	5:00	Beijing, China	
Win	4–0 (1)	Zhao Yafei	Decision (majority)	Ranik Ultimate Fighting Federation 13	June 7, 2014	3	5:00	Shanghai, China	
Win	3–0 (1)	Baasankhuu Damlanpurev	Submission (rear-naked choke)	Ranik Ultimate Fighting Federation 12	March 29, 2014	1	3:01	Shanghai, China	
Win	2–0 (1)	Alateng Heili	Decision (unanimous)	Ranik Ultimate Fighting Federation 11	November 30, 2013	3	5:00	Shanghai, China	
Win	1–0 (1)	Wulalibieke Baheibieke	Decision (unanimous)	Ranik Ultimate Fighting Federation 10	September 24, 2013	3	5:00	Shanghai, China	
NC	0–0 (1)	Zhao Wuheng	NC (accidental groin strike)	Ranik Ultimate Fighting Federation 9	May 18, 2013	1	N/A	Sanya, China	Bantamweight debut. Accidental groin strike rendered Zhao unable to continue.

== See also ==
- List of current UFC fighters
- List of male mixed martial artists
