= Cole Smith (fighter) =

Canadian mixed martial artist

- Born: April 5, 1989 (age 37); Squamish, British Columbia, Canada
- Other names: The Cole Train
- Height: 5 ft 11 in (1.80 m)
- Weight: 135 lb (61 kg; 9 st 9 lb)
- Division: Bantamweight
- Reach: 67 in (170 cm)
- Team: Squamish Martial Arts (formerly); Dynamic MMA; Team Quest Thailand; Xtreme Couture
- Rank: Black belt in Brazilian Jiu-Jitsu under Adam Ryan; Green belt in Taekwondo
- Years active: 2016–2022

Professional boxing record
- Total: 2
- Wins: 1
- By knockout: 0
- Losses: 1

Mixed martial arts record
- Total: 10
- Wins: 7
- By knockout: 2
- By submission: 3
- By decision: 2
- Losses: 3
- By decision: 3

Other information
- Boxing record from BoxRec
- Mixed martial arts record from Sherdog

Cole Smith (born April 5, 1989) is a Canadian professional mixed martial artist and former boxer in the Bantamweight division. A professional since 2016, he most notably competed in the UFC.

== Background ==
Smith was born and raised in Squamish, British Columbia, Canada as the youngest of four brothers. He started training Brazilian jiu-jitsu at the age of 20.

== Mixed martial arts career ==
=== Early career ===
Fighting out of Thailand, Smith made his debut in a regional Thailand organization, Thailand Ring Wars. Most of his pre-UFC career was spent in the BFL, Battlefield Fight League, based in British Columbia, Canada. He won the Bantamweight Championship and defended it twice before signing to the UFC in 2019.

=== Ultimate Fighting Championship ===
Smith made his UFC debut as a late replacement for Brian Kelleher against Mitch Gagnon on May 4, 2019, at UFC Fight Night 151. Smith won the fight by unanimous decision.

Smith faced Miles Johns on September 14, 2019, at UFC Fight Night: Cowboy vs. Gaethje. Smith lost a close fight by split decision.

Smith faced Hunter Azure on September 5, 2020, at UFC Fight Night: Overeem vs. Sakai. He lost via unanimous decision.

On December 4, 2020, it was announced that he was released from the UFC.

=== Post-UFC ===
Smith faced John Sweeney on April 2, 2022, at XMMA 4. He lost the fight via split decision.

== Championships and achievements ==
=== Mixed martial arts ===
- Battlefield Fight League
  - Battlefield Fight League Bantamweight Championship (Defended three times)

== Mixed martial arts record ==
Professional record breakdown
10 matches	7 wins	3 losses
By knockout	2	0
By submission	3	0
By decision	2	3

Res.	Record	Opponent	Method	Event	Date	Round	Time	Location	Notes
Loss	7–3	John Sweeney	Decision (split)	XMMA 4: Black Magic	April 2, 2022	3	5:00	New Orleans, Louisiana, United States	
Loss	7–2	Hunter Azure	Decision (unanimous)	UFC Fight Night: Overeem vs. Sakai	September 5, 2020	3	5:00	Las Vegas, Nevada, United States	
Loss	7–1	Miles Johns	Decision (split)	UFC Fight Night: Cowboy vs. Gaethje	September 14, 2019	3	5:00	Vancouver, British Columbia, Canada	
Win	7–0	Mitch Gagnon	Decision (unanimous)	UFC Fight Night: Iaquinta vs. Cowboy	May 4, 2019	3	5:00	Ottawa, Ontario, Canada	
Win	6–0	Tyler Wilson	Submission (rear-naked choke)	BFL 59	January 12, 2019	1	1:26	Coquitlam, British Columbia, Canada	Defended the BFL Bantamweight Championship.
Win	5–0	Carlos Galvan	Decision (unanimous)	BFL 54	March 17, 2018	5	5:00	Coquitlam, British Columbia, Canada	Defended the BFL Bantamweight Championship.
Win	4–0	Tyler Dolby	Submission (armbar)	BFL 52	November 18, 2017	1	3:13	Vancouver, British Columbia, Canada	Won the vacant BFL Bantamweight Championship.
Win	3–0	Reysaldo Trasmonte	TKO (punches)	Thailand Fighting Championship 2	April 1, 2017	1	N/A	Khao Lak, Thailand	
Win	2–0	Jamie Siraj	Submission (rear-naked choke)	BFL 46	October 29, 2016	4	2:15	Coquitlam, British Columbia, Canada	Catchweight (140 lb) bout.
Win	1–0	Komon Ninin	TKO (punches)	Thailand Ring Wars 3	February 20, 2016	1	0:35	Chiang Mai, Thailand	Bantamweight debut.

== Professional boxing record ==
2 fights	1 win	1 loss
By decision	1	1

No.	Result	Record	Opponent	Type	Round, time	Date	Location	Notes
2	Loss	1–1	(Canada) Connor Bush	UD	4	Feb 4, 2017	Deerfoot Inn & Casino, Calgary, Canada	
1	Win	1–0	(Thailand) Narong Bunchan	PTS	6	Jun 10, 2016	Maejo University, Chiang Mai, Thailand	

== See also ==
- List of male mixed martial artists
