= Mitch Gagnon =

Canadian mixed martial artist

- Born: Mitch Gagnon; October 10, 1984 (age 42); Sturgeon Falls, Ontario, Canada
- Height: 5 ft 5 in (1.65 m)
- Weight: 135 lb (61 kg; 9 st 9 lb)
- Division: Bantamweight (2011–2016, 2019); Featherweight (2008–2011)
- Reach: 65 in (165 cm)
- Fighting out of: Sudbury, Ontario, Canada
- Team: Troop MMA
- Rank: Black belt in Brazilian Jiu-Jitsu under Richie "Monkey" Nancoo
- Years active: 2008–2016, 2019

Mixed martial arts record
- Total: 17
- Wins: 12
- By knockout: 1
- By submission: 10
- By decision: 1
- Losses: 5
- By submission: 2
- By decision: 3

Other information
- Mixed martial arts record from Sherdog

Mitch Gagnon (born October 10, 1984) is a retired Canadian mixed martial artist who competed in the Bantamweight division. He is most notable for his time in the Ultimate Fighting Championship.

== Mixed martial arts career ==
=== Early career ===
Gagnon began training in 2006 and made his professional MMA debut in September 2008. He fought exclusively in his native Canada and amassed a record of 8–1 before joining the Ultimate Fighting Championship.

=== Ultimate Fighting Championship ===
Gagnon was expected to make his UFC debut in Chicago, Illinois at UFC on Fox 2 against The Ultimate Fighter 14 alumnus Johnny Bedford. On January 25, 2012, the UFC announced the bout was cancelled due to Gagnon's visa issues.

Gagnon faced Bryan Caraway on July 21, 2012, at UFC 149. He lost the fight via submission in the third round. Despite the loss, Gagnon was given a Fight of the Night bonus award for his performance.

Gagnon next faced Walel Watson on September 22, 2012, at UFC 152. He won the fight via submission in the first round.

Gagnon was expected to face Issei Tamura on March 16, 2013, at UFC 158. However, Gagnon was forced out of the bout with an injury and was replaced by T.J. Dillashaw.

Gagnon next faced Dustin Kimura on September 21, 2013, at UFC 165. He won the fight via submission in the first round. The win also earned him his first Submission of the Night fight bonus.

Gagnon was expected to face Alex Caceres on December 7, 2013, at UFC Fight Night 33. However, the bout was scrapped during the week leading up to the event due to an alleged visa issue for Gagnon, restricting his entry to Australia.

Gagnon faced promotional newcomer Tim Gorman on April 16, 2014, at The Ultimate Fighter: Nations Finale. He won the bout via unanimous decision.

Gagnon was expected to face Aljamain Sterling on October 4, 2014, at UFC Fight Night: MacDonald vs. Saffiedine. However, Sterling pulled out of the bout and was replaced by Rob Font. Subsequently, Font pulled out of the fight the week of the event and was replaced by Roman Salazar. Gagnon won via submission in the first round.

Gagnon faced Renan Barão on December 20, 2014, at UFC Fight Night 58. He lost the fight via an arm-triangle submission in the third round.

Gagnon returned from a near two year hiatus to face Matthew Lopez on December 10, 2016, at UFC 206. He lost the fight via unanimous decision.

Gagnon was expected to face Brett Johns on July 16, 2017, at UFC Fight Night 113. However, Gagnon was removed from the card on 27 June and replaced by Albert Morales.

Gagnon was expected to return from extended hiatus and face Brian Kelleher on May 4, 2019, at UFC Fight Night 151. However, Kelleher pulled out of the fight on April 10 citing injury and was replaced by promotional newcomer Cole Smith. Gagnon lost the fight by unanimous decision.

During the time since his last bout, Gagnon retired from MMA to focus on his family and coaching.

== Championships and accomplishments ==
- Ultimate Fighting Championship
  - Fight of the Night (One time)
  - Submission of the Night (One time)

== Mixed martial arts record ==
Professional record breakdown
| 17 matches | 12 wins | 5 losses |
| By knockout | 1 | 0 |
| By submission | 10 | 2 |
| By decision | 1 | 3 |

| Res. | Record | Opponent | Method | Event | Date | Round | Time | Location | Notes |
|---|---|---|---|---|---|---|---|---|---|
| Loss | 12–5 | Cole Smith | Decision (unanimous) | UFC Fight Night: Iaquinta vs. Cowboy | May 4, 2019 | 3 | 5:00 | Ottawa, Ontario, Canada | |
| Loss | 12–4 | Matthew Lopez | Decision (unanimous) | UFC 206 | December 10, 2016 | 3 | 5:00 | Toronto, Ontario, Canada | |
| Loss | 12–3 | Renan Barão | Submission (arm-triangle choke) | UFC Fight Night: Machida vs. Dollaway | December 20, 2014 | 3 | 3:53 | Barueri, Brazil | |
| Win | 12–2 | Roman Salazar | Submission (rear-naked choke) | UFC Fight Night: MacDonald vs. Saffiedine | October 4, 2014 | 1 | 2:06 | Halifax, Nova Scotia, Canada | |
| Win | 11–2 | Tim Gorman | Decision (unanimous) | The Ultimate Fighter Nations Finale: Bisping vs. Kennedy | April 16, 2014 | 3 | 5:00 | Quebec City, Quebec, Canada | |
| Win | 10–2 | Dustin Kimura | Technical Submission (guillotine choke) | UFC 165 | September 21, 2013 | 1 | 4:05 | Toronto, Ontario, Canada | Submission of the Night. |
| Win | 9–2 | Walel Watson | Submission (rear-naked choke) | UFC 152 | September 22, 2012 | 1 | 1:09 | Toronto, Ontario, Canada | |
| Loss | 8–2 | Bryan Caraway | Submission (rear-naked choke) | UFC 149 | July 21, 2012 | 3 | 1:39 | Calgary, Alberta, Canada | Fight of the Night. |
| Win | 8–1 | David Harris | Submission (guillotine choke) | Ringside MMA 12: Daley vs. Fioravanti | October 21, 2011 | 1 | 2:09 | Montreal, Quebec, Canada | Bantamweight debut. |
| Win | 7–1 | Rejean Groulx | Submission (slam) | Ringside MMA 10: Cote vs. Starnes | April 9, 2011 | 3 | 3:47 | Montreal, Quebec, Canada | Defended the Ringside Featherweight Championship. |
| Win | 6–1 | Guillaume Lamarche | Submission (guillotine choke) | Ringside MMA 6: Rage | April 10, 2010 | 1 | 0:52 | Montreal, Quebec, Canada | Won the Ringside Featherweight Championship. |
| Win | 5–1 | Stephane Bernadel | Submission (guillotine choke) | Wreck MMA: Fight for the Troops | December 11, 2009 | 1 | 0:38 | Gatineau, Quebec, Canada | |
| Win | 4–1 | Jeff Harrison | Submission (rear-naked choke) | Warrior-1 MMA 3: High Voltage | October 10, 2009 | 1 | 4:32 | Gatineau, Quebec, Canada | |
| Win | 3–1 | Eugenio Carpine | Submission (rear-naked choke) | Ringside MMA 1: The Comeback | May 30, 2009 | 1 | 1:29 | Montreal, Quebec, Canada | |
| Loss | 2–1 | Will Romero | Decision (unanimous) | Xtreme MMA 7: House of Pain | February 27, 2009 | 3 | 5:00 | Montreal, Quebec, Canada | |
| Win | 2–0 | Gabriel Lavallee | Submission (guillotine choke) | Xtreme MMA 6: House of Pain | November 8, 2008 | 1 | 2:18 | Montreal, Quebec, Canada | |
| Win | 1–0 | Dimitri Waardenburg | Submission (guillotine choke) | Xtreme MMA 5: It's Crow Time | September 13, 2008 | 1 | 2:32 | Montreal, Quebec, Canada | |

== See also ==
- List of male mixed martial artists
- List of Canadian UFC fighters
