= Miles Johns =

American mixed martial artist (born 1994)

- Born: Miles Xavier Johns; March 30, 1994 (age 32); Newton, Kansas, U.S.
- Other names: Chapo
- Height: 5 ft 7 in (1.70 m)
- Weight: 145 lb (66 kg; 10 st 5 lb)
- Division: Featherweight(2016, 2024); Bantamweight (2014–2015, 2017–present)
- Reach: 66 in (168 cm)
- Stance: Orthodox
- Fighting out of: Kansas City, Missouri, U.S.
- Team: Fortis MMA (2013–2022); Glory MMA & Fitness (2022); Marathon MMA (2023–present); Sampson Jiu-Jitsu Academy
- Years active: 2011–present

Mixed martial arts record
- Total: 22
- Wins: 16
- By knockout: 5
- By submission: 2
- By decision: 9
- Losses: 5
- By knockout: 1
- By submission: 2
- By decision: 2
- No contests: 1

Other information
- Mixed martial arts record from Sherdog

Miles Xavier Johns (born March 30, 1994) is an American mixed martial artist who competes in the Bantamweight division of the Ultimate Fighting Championship. A professional since 2014, he has also formerly competed for Legacy Fighting Alliance where he was the LFA Bantamweight Champion.

== Background ==
Miles was born and raised in Newton, Kansas along with two brothers and an older sister. One of the brothers – Elijah – is also an aspiring professional mixed martial artist. Miles started wrestling in the third grade, eventually winning the 5A Kansas state championship. Miles graduated from Newton High School, continuing to Newman University on a wrestling scholarship but became injured. By the time he was healed up from the injury, the season was over and Johns decided to drop out of college and compete in mixed martial arts.

== Mixed martial arts career ==
=== Early career ===
Not long after dropping out of the college, a friend told him about an amateur fighting event coming up and Johns took a fight on the spot on three weeks’ notice.

Starting his professional career in 2014, Johns compiled a 8–0 record fight mostly for Legacy Fighting Alliance where he won the LFA Bantamweight Championship. After accomplishing this feat, he was invited onto Dana White's Contender Series 18, where he won a decision victory against Richie Santiago, in the process gaining a UFC contract.

=== Ultimate Fighting Championship ===
In his UFC debut, Johns faced Cole Smith on September 14, 2019 at UFC Fight Night 158. He won a close fight by split decision.

On February 8, 2020, Johns faced Mario Bautista at UFC 247. He lost the fight via technical knockout in round two.

Johns faced Kevin Natividad on October 31, 2020 at UFC Fight Night 181. He won the fight via knockout in round three by hocking and holding his opponent's glove to keep him in range. This win earned him Performance Fight of the Night award.

Johns was scheduled to face Anderson dos Santos on July 17, 2021 at UFC on ESPN 26. However, the bout was removed hours before the show due to COVID-19 protocol issues stemming from Dos Santos' camp. The bout was rescheduled and eventually took place at UFC 265 on August 7, 2021. Johns won the fight via knockout in round three. This fight earned him the Performance of the Night award.

As the first bout of his four-fight contract, Johns faced John Castañeda on February 5, 2022 at UFC Fight Night 200. He lost the bout via third round technical submission.

On April 19, it was reported that Miles Johns tested positive for adderall in a urine test collected at the day of UFC Fight Night 200. As a result, he was received a six-month suspension, along with a $3,450 fine, which amounts to 15 percent of his fight purse.

Johns faced Vince Morales on November 19, 2022, at UFC Fight Night 215; replacing José Johnson. He won the fight via unanimous decision.

Johns was then scheduled to face Raoni Barcelos on June 17, 2023, at UFC on ESPN 47. However, during the fight week Johns withdrew from the bout citing an injury, leading the bout to be scrapped.

Johns faced Dan Argueta on September 23, 2023, at UFC Fight Night 228. He won the fight via unanimous decision. On November 15, 2023, Johns was suspended by Nevada Athletic Commission for a failed drug test after testing positive for the anabolic steroid turinabol. He was fined $2,300 and $157.04 in prosecution fees, with the bout being overturned to a no contest. He is suspended for four and the half months and will be eligible to return on February 6, 2024.

Johns faced Cody Gibson, replacing injured Davey Grant, on March 23, 2024, at UFC on ESPN 53. He won the bout by unanimous decision.

Johns faced Douglas Silva de Andrade on June 15, 2024, at UFC on ESPN 58. He won the fight by unanimous decision.

Johns was scheduled to face Cody Garbrandt on October 12, 2024 at UFC Fight Night 247. However, the bout was moved to UFC Fight Night 247 on November 9, 2024, for unknown reasons. In turn, Garbrandt withdrew from the bout due to undisclosed reasons and the bout was scrapped.

Johns faced Felipe Lima in a featherweight bout on December 14, 2024 at UFC on ESPN 63. He lost the fight by unanimous decision.

Johns made his return to bantamweight and faced Jean Matsumoto on August 9, 2025 at UFC on ESPN 72. He lost the fight by split decision.

Johns was scheduled to face Muin Gafurov on November 1, 2025 at UFC Fight Night 263. After Gafurov withdrew for undisclosed reasons, Johns was rebooked to fight Daniel Marcos the following week on November 8, 2025 at UFC Fight Night 264. Johns lost the fight via a rear-naked choke submission in the second round.

Johns was scheduled to face promotional newcomer Jessie Rosas on August 8, 2026 at UFC Fight Night 284. However, Rosas withdrew due to a forehead wound and was replaced by Gianni Vázquez, rejoining the promotion after being released earlier in the year. Johns won the fight by technical knockout in the first round.

== Personal life ==
Johns and his wife Hannah have three sons.

Johns graduated from Brookhaven College nursing program in December 2018 and is a registered nurse.

== Championships and achievements ==
- Ultimate Fighting Championship
  - Performance of the Night (Two times) vs. Kevin Natividad and Anderson dos Santos
- Legacy Fighting Alliance
  - LFA Bantamweight Champion (One Time)

== Mixed martial arts record ==
Professional record breakdown
22 matches	16 wins	5 losses
By knockout	5	1
By submission	2	2
By decision	9	2
No contests	1	

Res.	Record	Opponent	Method	Event	Date	Round	Time	Location	Notes
Win	16–5 (1)	Gianni Vázquez	TKO (punches)	UFC Fight Night: Gamrot vs. Salkilld	August 8, 2026	1	3:09	Las Vegas, Nevada, United States	Featherweight bout.
Loss	15–5 (1)	Daniel Marcos	Technical Submission (rear-naked choke)	UFC Fight Night: Bonfim vs. Brown	November 8, 2025	2	4:23	Las Vegas, Nevada, United States	
Loss	15–4 (1)	Jean Matsumoto	Decision (split)	UFC on ESPN: Dolidze vs. Hernandez	August 9, 2025	3	5:00	Las Vegas, Nevada, United States	Return to Bantamweight.
Loss	15–3 (1)	Felipe Lima	Decision (unanimous)	UFC on ESPN: Covington vs. Buckley	December 14, 2024	3	5:00	Tampa, Florida, United States	Featherweight bout.
Win	15–2 (1)	Douglas Silva de Andrade	Decision (unanimous)	UFC on ESPN: Perez vs. Taira	June 15, 2024	3	5:00	Las Vegas, Nevada, United States	
Win	14–2 (1)	Cody Gibson	Decision (unanimous)	UFC on ESPN: Ribas vs. Namajunas	March 23, 2024	3	5:00	Las Vegas, Nevada, United States	
NC	13–2 (1)	Dan Argueta	NC (overturned)	UFC Fight Night: Fiziev vs. Gamrot	September 23, 2023	3	5:00	Las Vegas, Nevada, United States	Originally a unanimous decision win for Johns; overturned after he tested positive for turinabol.
Win	13–2	Vince Morales	Decision (unanimous)	UFC Fight Night: Nzechukwu vs. Cuțelaba	November 19, 2022	3	5:00	Las Vegas, Nevada, United States	
Loss	12–2	John Castañeda	Technical Submission (arm-triangle choke)	UFC Fight Night: Hermansson vs. Strickland	February 5, 2022	3	1:38	Las Vegas, Nevada, United States	Johns tested positive for adderall.
Win	12–1	Anderson dos Santos	KO (punch)	UFC 265	August 7, 2021	3	1:16	Houston, Texas, United States	Performance of the Night.
Win	11–1	Kevin Natividad	KO (punch)	UFC Fight Night: Hall vs. Silva	October 31, 2020	3	2:51	Las Vegas, Nevada, United States	Performance of the Night.
Loss	10–1	Mario Bautista	TKO (flying knee and punches)	UFC 247	February 8, 2020	2	1:41	Houston, Texas, United States	
Win	10–0	Cole Smith	Decision (split)	UFC Fight Night: Cowboy vs. Gaethje	September 14, 2019	3	5:00	Vancouver, British Columbia, Canada	
Win	9–0	Richie Santiago	Decision (unanimous)	Dana White's Contender Series 18	June 25, 2019	3	5:00	Las Vegas, Nevada, United States	
Win	8–0	Adrian Yañez	Decision (split)	LFA 55	November 30, 2018	5	5:00	Dallas, Texas, United States	Won the vacant LFA Bantamweight Championship.
Win	7–0	Eric Ellington	Submission (guillotine choke)	LFA 40	May 25, 2018	2	4:13	Dallas, Texas, United States	
Win	6–0	Caio Machado	Decision (unanimous)	LFA 28	December 8, 2017	3	5:00	Dallas, Texas, United States	Catchweight (140 lb) bout.
Win	5–0	Levi Mowles	Decision (unanimous)	LFA 16	July 14, 2017	3	5:00	Dallas, Texas, United States	Return to Bantamweight.
Win	4–0	Eliazar Rodriguez	TKO (punches)	Legacy FC 56	June 24, 2016	2	0:38	Dallas, Texas, United States	Featherweight debut.
Win	3–0	Omar Benjar	Submission (arm-triangle choke)	Xtreme Knockout 28	December 5, 2015	3	1:20	Dallas, Texas, United States	
Win	2–0	David Miramontes	Decision (unanimous)	Xtreme Knockout 27	September 12, 2015	3	3:00	Dallas, Texas, United States	
Win	1–0	Tyler Pacheco	TKO (punches)	24/7 Entertainment 14 & 15	July 12, 2014	2	1:27	Midland, Texas, United States	Bantamweight debut.

== See also ==
- List of current UFC fighters
- List of Dana White's Contender Series alumni
- List of male mixed martial artists
