= Vince Morales =

American mixed martial arts fighter (born 1990)

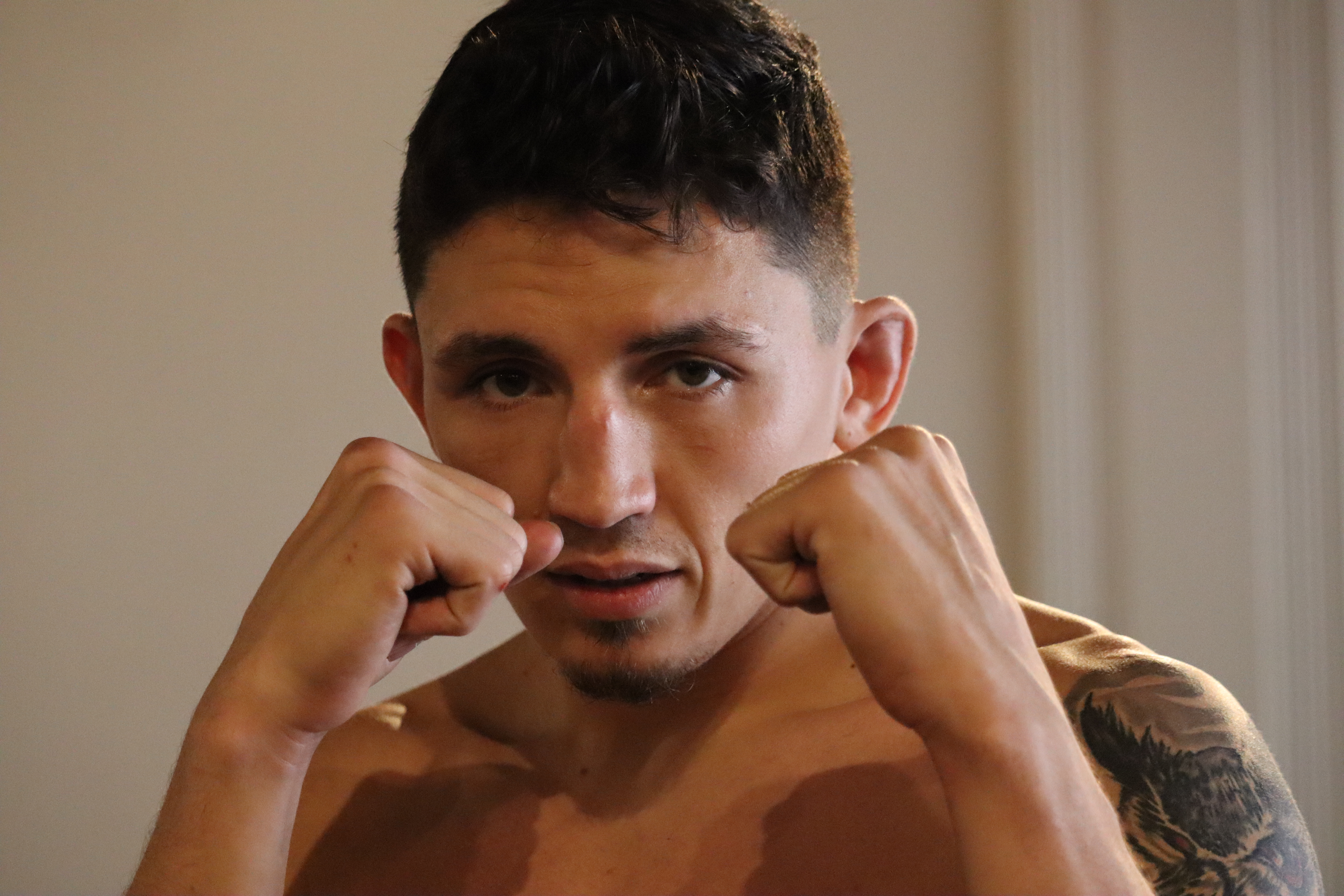
- Born: November 12, 1990 (age 36); Caldwell, Idaho, U.S.
- Other names: Vandetta
- Height: 5 ft 7 in (1.70 m)
- Weight: 145 lb (66 kg; 10 st 5 lb)
- Division: Featherweight; Bantamweight
- Reach: 70 in (178 cm)
- Fighting out of: Ontario, Oregon, U.S.
- Team: Freak-Jitsu (until 2020); Syndicate MMA (2020–present)
- Rank: Purple belt in Brazilian Jiu-Jitsu
- Years active: 2015–present

Mixed martial arts record
- Total: 29
- Wins: 18
- By knockout: 9
- By submission: 5
- By decision: 4
- Losses: 11
- By knockout: 1
- By submission: 2
- By decision: 8

Other information
- Mixed martial arts record from Sherdog

Vince Morales (born November 12, 1990) is an American mixed martial artist who competed in the Bantamweight division of the Ultimate Fighting Championship (UFC). A professional since 2015, Morales has also competed in Bellator.

== Background ==
Morales grew up in Ontario, Oregon and started wrestling while attending Ontario High School. Despite going winless in wrestling in his freshman year and halfway through the sophomore year, he ended up becoming a state champion in his senior year. Morales attended Boise State University for a spell but dropped out due to family issues.

== Mixed martial arts career ==
=== Early career ===
Morales made his MMA debut at featherweight against Joseph Cleveland on May 15, 2015, at FSF - Front Street Fights 5. He won the fight via submission with a rear-naked choke in the first round.

Following his MMA debut, Morales mainly fought within the Idaho regional MMA circuit, competing within organizations such as King of the Cage and Front Street Fights, wherein he held the organization's featherweight title.

=== Bellator MMA ===
Morales made his Bellator debut at featherweight on May 20, 2016, against Hamilton Ash at Bellator 155. He won the fight via knockout with punches in the third round.

Morales faced Justin Hugo at bantamweight on September 21, 2018, at Bellator 205. He won the fight via unanimous decision.

=== Dana White's Contender Series ===
Morales faced Domingo Pilarte on July 17, 2018, at Dana White's Contender Series 13. He lost the fight via technical submission via rear-naked choke.

=== Ultimate Fighting Championship ===
Replacing injured Frankie Saenz on short notice, Morales made his UFC debut at bantamweight on November 24, 2018, against Song Yadong at UFC Fight Night: Blaydes vs. Ngannou 2. He lost the fight via unanimous decision.

Morales then faced Aiemann Zahabi on May 4, 2019, at UFC Fight Night: Iaquinta vs. Cowboy. He won the fight via unanimous decision.

Morales next faced Benito Lopez on July 13, 2019, at UFC Fight Night: de Randamie vs. Ladd. He lost the fight via unanimous decision.

Morales then returned to featherweight and faced Chris Gutiérrez on May 30, 2020, at UFC on ESPN: Woodley vs. Burns. He lost the fight via TKO with leg kicks in the second round. Three months after his loss to Gutiérrez, he suffered a torn Achilles tendon which required two surgeries.

Morales returned to bantamweight and faced Drako Rodriguez at UFC 265 on August 7, 2021. He won the fight via unanimous decision.

Morales faced Louis Smolka on December 4, 2021, at UFC on ESPN 31. He won the fight via knockout out in round one.

Morales, as a replacement for Liudvik Sholinian, was scheduled to face Nathaniel Wood on March 19, 2022, at UFC Fight Night: Volkov vs. Aspinall. In turn, just days before the event, Morales withdrew due to illness, and the pair will be rescheduled for future event.

Morales faced Jonathan Martinez on May 21, 2022, at UFC Fight Night 206. He lost the fight via unanimous decision.

Morales was scheduled to face José Johnson on November 19, 2022, at UFC Fight Night 215, but Johnson pulled out for undisclosed reasons, and he was replaced by Miles Johns on November 19, 2022, at UFC Fight Night 215. Morales lost the fight via unanimous decision.

It was announced in mid-January that UFC released Morales.

=== Post UFC career ===
Morales faced Teruto Ishihara on May 3, 2023, at XMMA 6: Bash at the Beach. He won the bout in the third round, choking out Ishihara via anaconda choke.

Morales faced Yuki Motoya on December 31, 2023 at Rizin 45, winning the bout via unanimous decision.

Morales faced reigning UFL Bantamweight champion Hunter Azure for his title at United Fight League 5 on August 30, 2024. He would win the fight via submission in the third round after submitting Azure with a Peruvian necktie thus becoming the new UFL Bantamweight Champion.

=== Return to UFC ===
On short notice and replacing Felipe Lima, Morales made his return to the UFC and faced Taylor Lapilus on September 28, 2024 at UFC Fight Night 243. He lost the fight by unanimous decision.

Morales faced promotional newcomer Elijah Smith on February 15, 2025 at UFC Fight Night 251. He lost the fight by unanimous decision.

Morales faced Raul Rosas Jr. on March 29, 2025 at UFC on ESPN 64. He lost the fight by unanimous decision.

Morales faced Colby Thicknesse on May 2, 2026 at UFC Fight Night 275. He lost the fight by unanimous decision.

On May 29, 2026, it was reported that Morales was once again removed from the UFC roster.

== Personal life ==
Morales is the cousin of fellow UFC bantamweight fighter Ricky Simón.

== Championships and accomplishments ==
- Front Street Fights
  - FSF Featherweight Championship (One time)
- United Fight League
  - UFL Bantamweight Championship (One time, current)

== Mixed martial arts record ==
Professional record breakdown
29 matches	18 wins	11 losses
By knockout	9	1
By submission	5	2
By decision	4	8

Res.	Record	Opponent	Method	Event	Date	Round	Time	Location	Notes
Win	18–11	Amin Almelik	TKO (punches)	Tachi Palace Fights 38	November 14, 2026	1	0:30	Lemoore, California, United States	Return to Featherweight.
Win	17–11	Daniel Lacerda	TKO (punches)	Tuff-N-Uff 158	October 24, 2026	1	1:03	Las Vegas, Nevada, United States	
Loss	16–11	Colby Thicknesse	Decision (unanimous)	UFC Fight Night: Della Maddalena vs. Prates	May 2, 2026	3	5:00	Perth, Australia	
Loss	16–10	Raul Rosas Jr.	Decision (unanimous)	UFC on ESPN: Moreno vs. Erceg	March 29, 2025	3	5:00	Mexico City, Mexico	
Loss	16–9	Elijah Smith	Decision (unanimous)	UFC Fight Night: Cannonier vs. Rodrigues	February 15, 2025	3	5:00	Las Vegas, Nevada, United States	
Loss	16–8	Taylor Lapilus	Decision (unanimous)	UFC Fight Night: Moicano vs. Saint Denis	September 28, 2024	3	5:00	Paris, France	
Win	16–7	Hunter Azure	Submission (Peruvian necktie)	United Fight League 5	August 30, 2024	3	4:06	Chandler, Arizona, United States	Won the UFL Bantamweight Championship.
Win	15–7	Luis Guerrero	Submission (brabo choke)	Tuff-N-Uff 137	May 24, 2024	2	4:09	Las Vegas, Nevada, United States	
Win	14–7	Yuki Motoya	Decision (unanimous)	Rizin 45	December 31, 2023	3	5:00	Saitama, Japan	
Win	13–7	Joe Penafiel	TKO (punches)	Front Street Fights 26	July 28, 2023	2	2:19	Boise, Idaho, United States	Catchweight (144 lb) bout.
Win	12–7	Teruto Ishihara	Technical Submission (anaconda choke)	XMMA 6	May 3, 2023	3	1:17	Myrtle Beach, South Carolina, United States	Catchweight (140 lb) bout.
Loss	11–7	Miles Johns	Decision (unanimous)	UFC Fight Night: Nzechukwu vs. Cuțelaba	November 19, 2022	3	5:00	Las Vegas, Nevada, United States	
Loss	11–6	Jonathan Martinez	Decision (unanimous)	UFC Fight Night: Holm vs. Vieira	May 21, 2022	3	5:00	Las Vegas, Nevada, United States	
Win	11–5	Louis Smolka	KO (punches)	UFC on ESPN: Font vs. Aldo	December 4, 2021	1	2:02	Las Vegas, Nevada, United States	
Win	10–5	Drako Rodriguez	Decision (unanimous)	UFC 265	August 7, 2021	3	5:00	Houston, Texas, United States	
Loss	9–5	Chris Gutiérrez	TKO (leg kicks)	UFC on ESPN: Woodley vs. Burns	May 30, 2020	2	4:27	Las Vegas, Nevada, United States	Featherweight bout.
Loss	9–4	Benito Lopez	Decision (unanimous)	UFC Fight Night: de Randamie vs. Ladd	July 13, 2019	3	5:00	Sacramento, California, United States	
Win	9–3	Aiemann Zahabi	Decision (unanimous)	UFC Fight Night: Iaquinta vs. Cowboy	May 4, 2019	3	5:00	Ottawa, Ontario, Canada	
Loss	8–3	Song Yadong	Decision (unanimous)	UFC Fight Night: Blaydes vs. Ngannou 2	November 24, 2018	3	5:00	Beijing, China	
Win	8–2	Justin Hugo	Decision (unanimous)	Bellator 205	September 21, 2018	3	5:00	Boise, Idaho, United States	
Loss	7–2	Domingo Pilarte	Technical Submission (rear-naked choke)	Dana White's Contender Series 13	July 17, 2018	2	1:52	Las Vegas, Nevada, United States	
Win	7–1	Brandon Hempleman	TKO (punches)	Front Street Fights 15	January 19, 2018	2	2:38	Boise, Idaho, United States	Bantamweight debut.
Win	6–1	Rowdy Akers	Submission (arm-triangle choke)	KOTC: Quick Draw	June 17, 2017	1	1:58	Fort Hall, Idaho, United States	Catchweight (140 lb) bout.
Win	5–1	Andrew Cruz	KO (punches)	Front Street Fights 10	December 9, 2016	3	3:07	Boise, Idaho, United States	Won the FSF Featherweight Championship.
Win	4–1	Hamilton Ash	KO (punches)	Bellator 155	May 20, 2016	3	2:32	Boise, Idaho, United States	
Win	3–1	Patrick Trey Smith	TKO (punches)	Front Street Fights 8	February 13, 2016	1	4:15	Boise, Idaho, United States	
Loss	2–1	Josh Wick	Submission (armbar)	Front Street Fights 6	September 11, 2015	2	3:26	Boise, Idaho, United States	
Win	2–0	Jeremie Montgomery	TKO (punches)	Super Fight League 41	July 11, 2015	1	2:28	Tacoma, Washington, United States	
Win	1–0	Joseph Cleveland	Submission (rear-naked choke)	Front Street Fights 5	May 15, 2015	1	1:51	Boise, Idaho, United States	Featherweight debut.

== See also ==
- List of male mixed martial artists
