= Ricky Simón =

American mixed martial artist

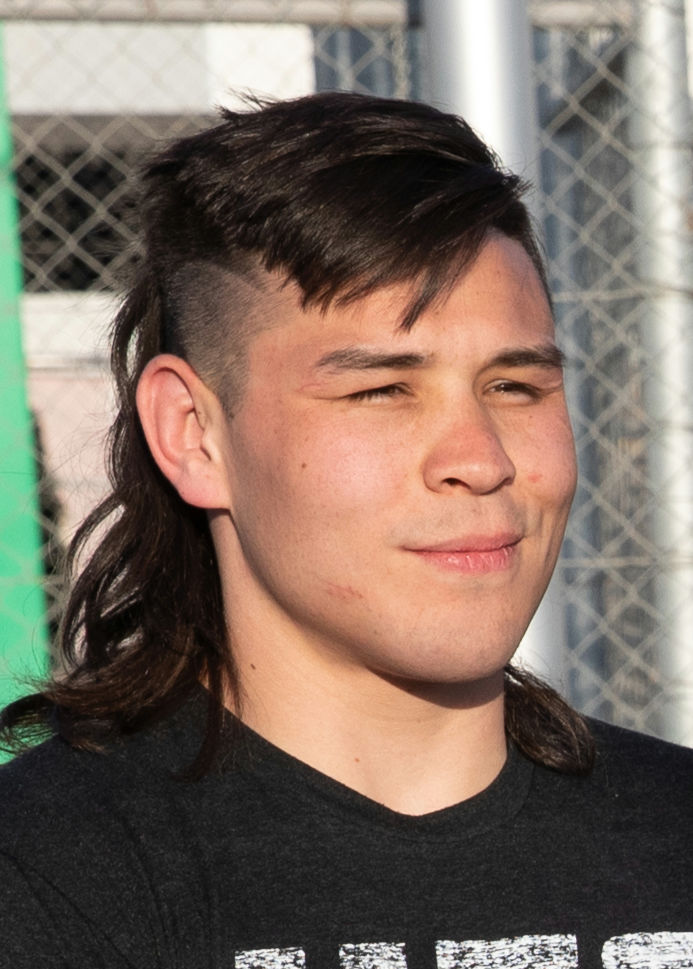
- Simón in 2019
- Born: August 31, 1992 (age 34); Pendleton, Oregon, U.S.
- Height: 5 ft 6 in (1.68 m)
- Weight: 136 lb (62 kg; 9 st 10 lb)
- Division: Bantamweight
- Reach: 69 in (175 cm)
- Fighting out of: Vancouver, Washington, U.S.
- Team: Gracie Barra Portland; American Top Team Portland; Team Oyama (2020–present); Syndicate MMA
- Trainer: Ian Loveland and Fabiano Scherner
- Rank: Black belt in Brazilian Jiu-Jitsu under Fabiano Scherner
- Years active: 2012–present

Mixed martial arts record
- Total: 31
- Wins: 22
- By knockout: 7
- By submission: 4
- By decision: 11
- Losses: 8
- By knockout: 3
- By submission: 1
- By decision: 4
- Draws: 1

Other information
- Mixed martial arts record from Sherdog

Ricky Simón (born August 31, 1992) is an American professional mixed martial artist who currently competes in the Bantamweight division of the Ultimate Fighting Championship (UFC). A professional since 2012, he was a former Legacy Fighting Alliance Bantamweight Champion.

== Background ==
Simón was born in Pendleton, Oregon. Coming from a tight-knit family of Mexican immigrants, his three brothers and Ricky have the same tattoo "Simón" inked across their upper back. Simón also grew up with his close second cousin and fellow UFC athlete Vince Morales. Simón started training in wrestling at nine years old. He graduated class of 2010 from Union High School in Camas, WA, where he also wrestled and placed seventh in the state in his sophomore year. After his post-graduation plans to be a collegiate wrestler for Clark College did not materialize, he transitioned to mixed martial arts.

== Mixed martial arts career ==
=== Early career ===
Simón amassed an amateur record of 3–0 before turning professional in 2014. After compiling a professional record of 12–1, fighting for Main Event Sports, King of the Cage (KOTC), Titan Fighting Championship and he was the formal Legacy Fighting Alliance Bantamweight Champion prior joining the UFC.

=== Ultimate Fighting Championship ===
In his UFC debut, Simón faced Merab Dvalishvili on April 21, 2018, at UFC Fight Night 128 in Atlantic City, New Jersey. In the final round, Simón mounted Dvalishvili with a guillotine choke, while Dvalishvili kicked his way to the end of the bell. Referee, Liam Kerriga, awarded the win to Simón citing Dvalishvili was thought to have been passed out by the ref who eventually stopped the fight. Dvalishvilli's manager Matthew Culley filed a request to the commission to review the referee decision and the appeal was denied. This fight earned him the Fight of the Night award.

Simón was scheduled to face Benito Lopez at UFC 227 on August 4, 2018. However, it was reported that Lopez pulled out from the bout for undisclosed reason and was replaced by Montel Jackson. He won the fight via unanimous decision.

Simón was expected to face Ricardo Ramos on November 10, 2018, at UFC Fight Night 139. However, it was reported on October 16, 2018, that Ramos was pulled from the bout due to a hand injury and in turn, Simón was removed from the card as well.

Simón faced Rani Yahya on February 10, 2019, at UFC 234. He won the fight via unanimous decision, knocking Yahya down multiple times in the first round.

Simón faced Urijah Faber on July 13, 2019, at UFC Fight Night 155. He lost the fight via technical knockout in round one.

Simón faced Rob Font at UFC on ESPN 7 on December 7, 2019. He lost the fight via unanimous decision. This fight earned him the Fight of the Night award.

As the first fight of his new, four-fight contract, Simón faced Ray Borg on May 13, 2020, at UFC Fight Night 171. He won the fight via split decision.

Simón was scheduled to face Brian Kelleher in a featherweight bout on September 5, 2020, at UFC Fight Night 176. However, Simón's cornerman tested positive for COVID-19 and he was forced to withdraw from the event. The pair was rescheduled on January 16, 2021, at UFC on ABC 1. In turn, Kelleher also tested positive on January 1 and was pulled from the bout. He was replaced by newcomer Gaetano Pirrello and the bout took place four days later at UFC on ESPN: Chiesa vs. Magny. He won the bout via second round arm triangle submission.

The bout between Simón and Brian Kelleher was rebooked for the third time and took place at UFC 258 on February 13, 2021. He won the fight via unanimous decision.

Simón was scheduled to face Timur Valiev on September 25, 2021, at UFC 266. However, the bout was never officially announced by the promotion and Valiev was instead scheduled to face Daniel Santos at UFC Fight Night: Vieira vs. Tate.

As the first bout of his new four-fight contract, Simón faced Raphael Assunção on December 18, 2021, at UFC Fight Night 199. Simón won the fight via knockout in the second round.

Simón faced Jack Shore on July 16, 2022, at UFC on ABC 3. He won the fight via arm-triangle submission in the second round. This win earned Simón his first Performance of the Night bonus award.

Simón was scheduled to face Song Yadong on April 22, 2023, at UFC Fight Night 222. However, the bout was instead delayed a week to UFC on ESPN: Song vs. Simón. He lost the fight via technical knockout in the fifth round.

Simón faced Mario Bautista on January 13, 2024, at UFC Fight Night 234. He lost the bout via unanimous decision.

Simón faced Vinicius Oliveira on June 29, 2024, at UFC 303. He lost the fight by unanimous decision.

Simón faced Javid Basharat on February 22, 2025, at UFC Fight Night 252. He won the fight by knockout in the first round. This fight earned him another Performance of the Night award.

Simón was scheduled to face Charles Jourdain on June 14, 2025, at UFC on ESPN 69. However, Jourdain withdrew one week before the event due to an eye injury and was replaced by Cameron Smotherman. Simón won the fight by unanimous decision.

Simón faced Raoni Barcelos on November 8, 2025, at UFC Fight Night 264. He lost the fight by unanimous decision.

Simón faced Adrian Yañez on March 28, 2026 at UFC Fight Night 271. The bout was declared a majority draw. 14 out of 15 media outlets scored the bout for Yanez.

Simón faced Montel Jackson in a rematch on September 26, 2026 at UFC Fight Night 289. He lost the fight by technical knockout in the second round.

== Professional grappling career ==
Simón competed alongside John Simon in a tag-team Brazilian jiu-jitsu match against Willie Audifre and Mike Currier at Submission Underground 21 on March 28, 2021. They won the match 3-0 and became the inaugural Submission Underground tag-team champions. Simón and Simon returned to defend their titles against Cris Lencioni and Owen Papworth at Submission Underground 22 on April 25, 2021, although they lost the match in EBI overtime.

Simón competed against Joao Miyao at Pit Submission Series 2 on February 23, 2024. He was submitted with a heel hook and lost the match.

== Personal life ==
Simón used to be a middle school wrestling coach. He is the cousin of fellow UFC bantamweight fighter Vince Morales.

Simón has a daughter, born in November 2022.

== Championships and accomplishments ==
=== Mixed martial arts ===
- Ultimate Fighting Championship
  - Fight of the Night (Two times) vs. Merab Dvalishvili and Rob Font
  - Performance of the Night (Two times) vs. Jack Shore and Javid Basharat
  - Second most takedowns landed in UFC Bantamweight division history (44) (behind Merab Dvalishvili)
  - Latest finish in a UFC three-round bout (5:00 in R3) (vs. Merab Dvalishvili)
- Legacy Fighting Alliance
  - LFA Bantamweight Championship (One time)
    - One successful title defense vs. Vinicius Zani

== Mixed martial arts record ==
Professional record breakdown
31 matches	22 wins	8 losses
By knockout	7	3
By submission	4	1
By decision	11	4
Draws	1	

Res.	Record	Opponent	Method	Event	Date	Round	Time	Location	Notes
Loss	22–8–1	Montel Jackson	KO (punches)	UFC Fight Night: Rosas Jr. vs. Barcelos	September 26, 2026	2	2:39	Las Vegas, Nevada, United States	
Draw	22–7–1	Adrian Yañez	Draw (majority)	UFC Fight Night: Adesanya vs. Pyfer	March 28, 2026	3	5:00	Seattle, Washington, United States	
Loss	22–7	Raoni Barcelos	Decision (unanimous)	UFC Fight Night: Bonfim vs. Brown	November 8, 2025	3	5:00	Las Vegas, Nevada, United States	
Win	22–6	Cameron Smotherman	Decision (unanimous)	UFC on ESPN: Usman vs. Buckley	June 14, 2025	3	5:00	Atlanta, Georgia, United States	
Win	21–6	Javid Basharat	KO (punch)	UFC Fight Night: Cejudo vs. Song	February 22, 2025	1	3:58	Seattle, Washington, United States	Performance of the Night.
Loss	20–6	Vinicius Oliveira	Decision (unanimous)	UFC 303	June 29, 2024	3	5:00	Las Vegas, Nevada, United States	
Loss	20–5	Mario Bautista	Decision (unanimous)	UFC Fight Night: Ankalaev vs. Walker 2	January 13, 2024	3	5:00	Las Vegas, Nevada, United States	
Loss	20–4	Song Yadong	TKO (punches)	UFC on ESPN: Song vs. Simón	April 29, 2023	5	1:10	Las Vegas, Nevada, United States	
Win	20–3	Jack Shore	Submission (arm-triangle choke)	UFC on ABC: Ortega vs. Rodríguez	July 16, 2022	2	3:28	Elmont, New York, United States	Performance of the Night.
Win	19–3	Raphael Assunção	KO (punches)	UFC Fight Night: Lewis vs. Daukaus	December 18, 2021	2	2:14	Las Vegas, Nevada, United States	
Win	18–3	Brian Kelleher	Decision (unanimous)	UFC 258	February 13, 2021	3	5:00	Las Vegas, Nevada, United States	Featherweight bout.
Win	17–3	Gaetano Pirrello	Submission (arm-triangle choke)	UFC on ESPN: Chiesa vs. Magny	January 20, 2021	2	4:00	Abu Dhabi, United Arab Emirates	
Win	16–3	Ray Borg	Decision (split)	UFC Fight Night: Smith vs. Teixeira	May 13, 2020	3	5:00	Jacksonville, Florida, United States	
Loss	15–3	Rob Font	Decision (unanimous)	UFC on ESPN: Overeem vs. Rozenstruik	December 7, 2019	3	5:00	Washington, D.C., United States	Fight of the Night.
Loss	15–2	Urijah Faber	TKO (punches)	UFC Fight Night: de Randamie vs. Ladd	July 13, 2019	1	0:46	Sacramento, California, United States	
Win	15–1	Rani Yahya	Decision (unanimous)	UFC 234	February 10, 2019	3	5:00	Melbourne, Australia	
Win	14–1	Montel Jackson	Decision (unanimous)	UFC 227	August 4, 2018	3	5:00	Los Angeles, California, United States	
Win	13–1	Merab Dvalishvili	Technical Submission (guillotine choke)	UFC Fight Night: Barboza vs. Lee	April 21, 2018	3	5:00	Atlantic City, New Jersey, United States	Fight of the Night.
Win	12–1	Vinicius Zani	KO (punches)	LFA 36	March 23, 2018	1	0:59	Cabazon, California, United States	Defended the LFA Bantamweight Championship.
Win	11–1	Chico Camus	Decision (unanimous)	LFA 29	December 15, 2017	5	5:00	Prior Lake, Minnesota, United States	Won the vacant LFA Bantamweight Championship.
Win	10–1	Donavon Frelow	Decision (split)	Dana White's Contender Series 5	August 8, 2017	3	5:00	Las Vegas, Nevada, United States	Return to Bantamweight.
Win	9–1	Charon Spain	Submission (arm-triangle choke)	KOTC: Headstrong	May 27, 2017	1	1:59	Lincoln City, Oregon, United States	
Win	8–1	Eduardo Torres	Decision (unanimous)	KOTC: Heavy Trauma	February 4, 2017	3	5:00	Lincoln City, Oregon, United States	Return to Featherweight.
Loss	7–1	Anderson dos Santos	Technical Submission (rear-naked choke)	Titan FC 37	March 4, 2016	2	2:38	Ridgefield, Washington, United States	For the vacant Titan FC Bantamweight Championship.
Win	7–0	Alex Soto	Decision (unanimous)	Titan FC 35	September 19, 2015	3	5:00	Ridgefield, Washington, United States	
Win	6–0	Jeremiah Labiano	Decision (split)	Tachi Palace Fights 24	August 6, 2015	3	5:00	Lemoore, California, United States	
Win	5–0	Paul Njoku	Decision (unanimous)	KOTC: Warrior's Spirit	March 21, 2015	3	5:00	Lincoln City, Oregon, United States	Return to Bantamweight.
Win	4–0	Cole Milani	TKO (punches)	Rumble at the Roseland 80	November 19, 2014	1	0:55	Portland, Oregon, United States	Catchweight (150 lb) bout.
Win	3–0	John Martinez	TKO (punches)	Main Event MMA 3	August 16, 2014	1	3:41	Longview, Washington, United States	Featherweight debut.
Win	2–0	Kendall Ward	TKO (punches)	Main Event MMA 2	April 19, 2014	1	0:49	Vancouver, Washington, United States	
Win	1–0	Alex Eastman	TKO (punches)	Main Event MMA 1	January 18, 2014	1	1:34	Vancouver, Washington, United States	Bantamweight debut.

== See also ==
- List of current UFC fighters
- List of Dana White's Contender Series alumni
- List of male mixed martial artists
