= Umar Nurmagomedov =

Russian mixed martial artist (born 1996)

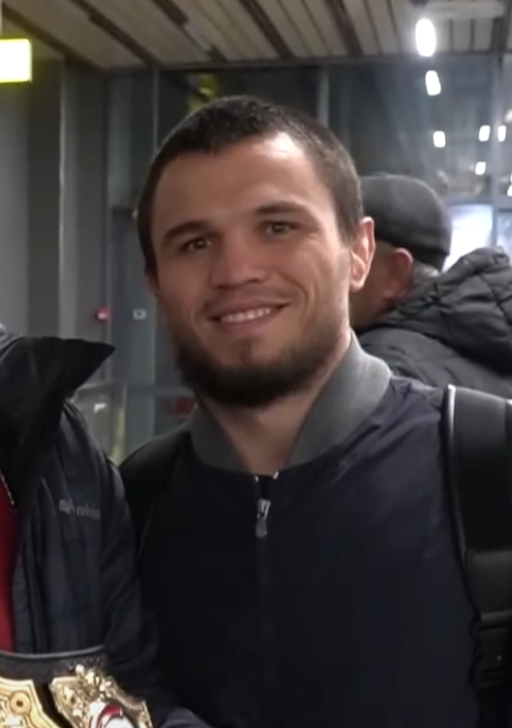
- Nurmagomedov in 2022
- Born: Umar Magomednabiyevich Nurmagomedov; January 3, 1996 (age 30); Kizilyurt, Dagestan, Russia
- Native name: Умар Нурмагомедов
- Height: 5 ft 8 in (173 cm)
- Weight: 135 lb (61 kg; 9 st 9 lb)
- Division: Bantamweight (2016–present); Featherweight (2022)
- Reach: 69 in (175 cm)
- Style: Combat Sambo
- Fighting out of: Kizilyurt, Dagestan, Russia
- Team: Eagles MMA; American Kickboxing Academy
- Trainer: Abdulmanap Nurmagomedov (former); Javier Mendez; Khabib Nurmagomedov
- Rank: International Master of Sports in Combat Sambo
- Years active: 2016–present

Mixed martial arts record
- Total: 22
- Wins: 20
- By knockout: 2
- By submission: 7
- By decision: 11
- Losses: 2
- By knockout: 1
- By decision: 1

Other information
- Mixed martial arts record from Sherdog

Umar Magomednabiyevich Nurmagomedov (Russian: Умар Магомеднабиевич Нурмагомедов; born January 3, 1996) is a Russian professional mixed martial artist. He currently competes in the Bantamweight division of the Ultimate Fighting Championship (UFC). Nurmagomedov has previously competed in the Eagle Fighting Championship (EFC) and Professional Fighters League (PFL). He is the first cousin of former UFC Lightweight Champion Khabib Nurmagomedov and the older brother of former Bellator and current PFL champion Usman Nurmagomedov. As of August 29, 2026, Nurmagomedov is #5 in the Meta UFC bantamweight rankings.

== Background ==
As a child, living in his native village, with his brother Usman Nurmagomedov, he began to attend freestyle wrestling practice. Later, Nurmagomedov began practicing Thai boxing, and his brother followed suit.

After moving to Makhachkala, Nurmagomedov began training with his uncle, Abdulmanap Nurmagomedov at the Eagles MMA camp. He is of Avar ethnic origin.

At the age of 19, Nurmagomedov became a combat sambo world champion, winning the -62 kg division at the WCSF World Championships. The following year, he won the bantamweight division in amateur mixed martial arts at the WMMAA World Championship.

== Mixed martial arts career ==
=== Early career ===
He made his debut in Moscow as part of the Fight Nights Global 57 on December 16, 2016, against Rishat Kharisov. Nurmagomedov won via second round guillotine choke. In his sophomore performance, Nurmagomedov fought Ulukbek Amanbaev at Fight Star: Battle on Sura 6 on January 5, 2017, winning inside the first round by the way of rear-naked choke. Returning to Fight Nights Global for his next 4 bouts; Nurmagomedov defeated Alym Isabaev at Fight Nights Global 62 by TKO stoppage in the second round, Valisher Rakhmonov by second round rear-naked choke at Fight Nights Global 71, Nauruz Dzamikhov by unanimous decision at Fight Nights Global 76 and finally Shyudi Yamauchi by unanimous decision at Fight Nights Global 83. Moving over to Samara MMA Federation (now known as Eagle FC), on May 11, 2018, Nurmagomedov won the FMMAS Bantamweight Championship against Fatkhidin Sobirov at Samara at the Battle on Volga 4, winning the title and the bout by unanimous decision.

On August 30, 2018, Nurmagomedov fought at PFL 7 against future UFC fighter Saidyokub Kakhramonov, winning the bout by unanimous decision.

Returning to Samara MMA Federation, Nurmagomedov defended his title at Battle on the Volga 10 on April 14, 2019, where he defeated Brazilian Wagner Lima by unanimous decision. With his title once again on the line (with Samara MMA Federation changing its name to Gorilla Fighting Championship), Nurmagomedov defeated Taras Gryckiv at GFC 14 on July 13, 2019, by rear-naked choke in the first round.

Nurmagomedov made his return to PFL, competing at PFL 6 on August 8, 2019, where Nurmagomedov defeated Sidemar Honorio by unanimous decision.

On November 23, 2019, in the capital of Uzbekistan, Tashkent, Nurmagomedov defended his title against Argentine fighter Brian Gonzalez, defeating his opponent via rear-naked choke at the end of the first round.

=== Ultimate Fighting Championship ===
Nurmagomedov was scheduled to face Hunter Azure on April 18, 2020, at UFC 249. However, the event was then postponed.

Nurmagomedov was scheduled to face Nathaniel Wood on 26 July 2020 at UFC on ESPN 14. However, Nurmagomedov withdrew from the bout due to his uncle Abdulmanap Nurmagomedov's passing.

Nurmagomedov was initially scheduled to face Sergey Morozov on October 24, 2020, at UFC 254, but Nurmagomedov pulled out due to an illness. The pairing was then rescheduled for UFC 257 on January 24, 2021. However, the bout was yet again rescheduled the second time on January 20, 2021, at UFC on ESPN 20. Nurmagomedov won the bout via a rear-naked choke in the second round. This bout earned him the Performance of the Night bonus.

Nurmagomedov faced Brian Kelleher on March 5, 2022, at UFC 272. He won the fight via a rear naked choke in round one.

Nurmagomedov was scheduled to face Jack Shore on March 19, 2022, at UFC Fight Night 204. However, Nurmagomedov was removed from the bout for unknown reason and he was replaced by Timur Valiev.

Nurmagomedov faced Nate Maness on June 25, 2022, at UFC on ESPN 38. He won via unanimous decision.

Nurmagomedov faced Raoni Barcelos on January 14, 2023, at UFC Fight Night 217. He won the fight via knockout in the first round. This win earned him the Performance of the Night bonus.

Nurmagomedov was scheduled to face Cory Sandhagen on August 5, 2023, at UFC on ESPN 50. However, Nurmagomedov withdrew from the event mid-July due to shoulder injury, and was replaced by Rob Font.

Nurmagomedov faced promotional newcomer Bekzat Almakhan on March 2, 2024, at UFC Fight Night 238. After being clipped early in the first round, Nurmagomedov took over and dominated the majority of the bout on the ground with strikes leading to a victory by unanimous decision.

Nurmagomedov faced Cory Sandhagen on August 3, 2024, at UFC on ABC 7 in a bantamweight title eliminator. He won the fight by unanimous decision.

Nurmagomedov was scheduled to face Song Yadong in the main event on December 14, 2024 at UFC on ESPN 63. However, the bout was scrapped due to Yadong's injury.

Nurmagomedov faced champion Merab Dvalishvili for the UFC Bantamweight Championship on January 18, 2025 at UFC 311. He lost the fight by unanimous decision, marking his first loss in MMA. This fight earned him his first Fight of the Night award.

Nurmagomedov was scheduled to face Mario Bautista on October 18, 2025, in the main event at UFC Fight Night 262. However, for unknown reasons, the bout was moved to October 25, 2025 one week later at UFC 321. Nurmagomedov won the fight by unanimous decision.

Nurmagomedov faced former two-time UFC Flyweight Champion Deiveson Figueiredo on January 24, 2026 at UFC 324. Figueiredo weighed in at 138.5 pounds, two and a half pounds over the bantamweight non‑title limit. As a result, the bout proceeded at catchweight, and Figueiredo was fined 25 percent of his purse, which was awarded to Nurmagomedov. He won the fight via unanimous decision.

Nurmagomedov was scheduled to face David Martínez on July 25, 2026 at UFC Fight Night 282. However, Martínez withdrew from the bout due to an injury, so the bout was cancelled.

Nurmagomedov faced Song Yadong in the main event on August 29, 2026, at UFC Fight Night 286. He lost the fight via second round knockout.

== Grappling career ==
Nurmagomedov was scheduled to compete against former two-time Bellator Bantamweight World Champion Eduardo Dantas in a no-gi featherweight grappling match on October 25, 2024 in the main event at ADXC 6 but the bout was cancelled.

== Freestyle wrestling ==
Nurmagomedov was originally scheduled to face former Urijah Faber in a catchweight bout, but Nurmagomedov was removed from the card and replaced by Saba Lazishvili.

== Championships and accomplishments ==
=== Amateur mixed martial arts ===
- World Mixed Martial Arts Association (WMMAA)
  - World Champion (2016 at bantamweight)

=== Professional mixed martial arts ===
- Ultimate Fighting Championship
  - Fight of the Night (One time) vs Merab Dvalishvili
  - Performance of the Night (Two times) vs Sergey Morozov and Raoni Barcelos
  - Fifth highest significant strike accuracy percentage in UFC Bantamweight division history (56.1%)
  - Tied (Tony Gravely) for third most takedowns landed in UFC Bantamweight division history (33)
  - FIfth highest top position time in UFC Bantamweight division history (42:48)
  - Sixth most average longest fight time in UFC Bantamweight division history (15:25)
  - Fourth most significant strikes landed in a UFC Bantamweight match (61) (vs. Bekzat Almakhan)
  - Third most takedowns landed in a UFC Bantamweight match (11) (vs. Mario Bautista)
  - Highest takedown accuracy in a UFC Bantamweight match (78.6%) (Min. 10 takedown attempts) (vs. Mario Bautista)
  - UFC Honors Awards
    - 2025: President's Choice Fight of the Year Nominee vs. Merab Dvalishvili
- Eagle Fighting Championship (Note: Federation of MMA of Samara at the time.)
  - GF Bantamweight Championship (One time)
    - Three successful title defences
- MMA Mania
  - 2025 #3 Ranked Fight of the Year vs. Merab Dvalishvili at UFC 311

=== Sambo ===
- World Combat Sambo Federation
  - World Champion (2015 at -62 kg)

== Mixed martial arts record ==
Professional record breakdown
22 matches	20 wins	2 losses
By knockout	2	1
By submission	7	0
By decision	11	1

Res.	Record	Opponent	Method	Event	Date	Round	Time	Location	Notes
Loss	20–2	Song Yadong	KO (punch)	UFC Fight Night: Nurmagomedov vs. Song	August 29, 2026	2	1:48	Shanghai, China	
Win	20–1	Deiveson Figueiredo	Decision (unanimous)	UFC 324	January 24, 2026	3	5:00	Las Vegas, Nevada, United States	Catchweight (138.5 lb) bout; Figueiredo missed weight.
Win	19–1	Mario Bautista	Decision (unanimous)	UFC 321	October 25, 2025	3	5:00	Abu Dhabi, United Arab Emirates	
Loss	18–1	Merab Dvalishvili	Decision (unanimous)	UFC 311	January 18, 2025	5	5:00	Inglewood, California, United States	For the UFC Bantamweight Championship. Fight of the Night.
Win	18–0	Cory Sandhagen	Decision (unanimous)	UFC on ABC: Sandhagen vs. Nurmagomedov	August 3, 2024	5	5:00	Abu Dhabi, United Arab Emirates	UFC Bantamweight title eliminator.
Win	17–0	Bekzat Almakhan	Decision (unanimous)	UFC Fight Night: Rozenstruik vs. Gaziev	March 2, 2024	3	5:00	Las Vegas, Nevada, United States	
Win	16–0	Raoni Barcelos	KO (body kick and punch)	UFC Fight Night: Strickland vs. Imavov	January 14, 2023	1	4:40	Las Vegas, Nevada, United States	Performance of the Night.
Win	15–0	Nate Maness	Decision (unanimous)	UFC on ESPN: Tsarukyan vs. Gamrot	June 25, 2022	3	5:00	Las Vegas, Nevada, United States	Return to Bantamweight.
Win	14–0	Brian Kelleher	Submission (rear-naked choke)	UFC 272	March 5, 2022	1	3:15	Las Vegas, Nevada, United States	Featherweight debut.
Win	13–0	Sergey Morozov	Technical Submission (rear-naked choke)	UFC on ESPN: Chiesa vs. Magny	January 20, 2021	2	3:39	Abu Dhabi, United Arab Emirates	Performance of the Night.
Win	12–0	Braian Gonzalez	Submission (rear-naked choke)	Gorilla Fighting 20	November 23, 2019	1	4:34	Tashkent, Uzbekistan	Defended the GF Bantamweight Championship.
Win	11–0	Sidemar Honorio	Decision (unanimous)	PFL 6 (2019)	August 8, 2019	3	5:00	Atlantic City, New Jersey, United States	
Win	10–0	Taras Gryckiv	Submission (rear-naked choke)	Gorilla Fighting 14	July 23, 2019	1	2:46	Kaspiysk, Russia	Defended the GF Bantamweight Championship.
Win	9–0	Wagner Lima	Decision (unanimous)	Battle on Volga 10	April 14, 2019	3	5:00	Toliatti, Russia	Defended the FMMAS Bantamweight Championship.
Win	8–0	Saidyokub Kakhramonov	Decision (unanimous)	PFL 7 (2018)	August 30, 2018	3	5:00	Atlantic City, New Jersey, United States	Catchweight (140 lb) bout.
Win	7–0	Fatkhidin Sobirov	Decision (unanimous)	Battle on Volga 4	May 11, 2018	3	5:00	Samara, Russia	Won the inaugural FMMAS Bantamweight Championship.
Win	6–0	Shyudi Yamauchi	Decision (unanimous)	Fight Nights Global 83	February 22, 2018	3	5:00	Moscow, Russia	
Win	5–0	Nauruz Dzamikhov	Decision (unanimous)	Fight Nights Global 76	October 8, 2017	3	5:00	Krasnodar, Russia	
Win	4–0	Valisher Rakhmonov	Submission (rear-naked choke)	Fight Nights Global 71	July 29, 2017	2	4:45	Moscow, Russia	
Win	3–0	Alym Isabaev	TKO (punches)	Fight Nights Global 62	March 31, 2017	2	3:32	Moscow, Russia	
Win	2–0	Ulukbek Amanbaev	Submission (rear-naked choke)	Fight Stars: Battle on Sura 6	January 5, 2017	1	4:12	Penza, Russia	
Win	1–0	Rishat Kharisov	Submission (guillotine choke)	Fight Nights Global 57	December 16, 2016	2	3:28	Moscow, Russia	Bantamweight debut.

== See also ==
- List of current UFC fighters
- List of male mixed martial artists
