= UFC Fight Night: Nzechukwu vs. Cuțelaba =

UFC mixed martial arts event in 2022

- The poster for UFC Fight Night: Nzechukwu vs. Cuțelaba
- Promotion: Ultimate Fighting Championship
- Date: November 19, 2022
- Venue: UFC Apex
- City: Enterprise, Nevada, United States
- Attendance: Not announced

Event chronology
UFC 281: Adesanya vs. Pereira	UFC Fight Night: Nzechukwu vs. Cuțelaba	UFC on ESPN: Thompson vs. Holland

UFC Fight Night: Nzechukwu vs. Cuțelaba (also known as UFC Fight Night 215, UFC on ESPN+ 73 and UFC Vegas 65) was a mixed martial arts event produced by the Ultimate Fighting Championship that took place on November 19, 2022, at the UFC Apex facility in Enterprise, Nevada, part of the Las Vegas Metropolitan Area, United States.

== Background ==
A heavyweight bout between former UFC Heavyweight Championship challenger Derrick Lewis and Sergey Spivak was expected to headline the event. However, while the event was in progress, Lewis was forced to withdraw due to non-COVID, non-weight cutting illness and the bout was cancelled. As a result, the intended light heavyweight co-main event between Kennedy Nzechukwu and Ion Cuțelaba headlined the event, with the fight being confirmed as the new main event just an hour before the start of the main card.

Jack Shore was expected to face Kyler Phillips in a bantamweight bout. However, Shore suffered "a serious knee injury" and is not expect to return to competition before the end of 2022. As a result, Phillips was pulled from the event.

A light heavyweight bout between William Knight and Marcin Prachnio was scheduled for the event. However, the bout was scrapped a week before the event for undisclosed reasons.

A middleweight bout between Rodolfo Vieira and Cody Brundage was expected to take place at the event. However, Vieira pulled out from the event due to undisclosed reasons and the bout was scrapped.

Vince Morales was expected to face José Johnson in a bantamweight bout. However, Johnson pulled out for undisclosed reasons and was replaced by former LFA Bantamweight Champion Miles Johns.

== Results ==
Main card (ESPN+)
Weight class				Method	Round	Time	Notes
Light Heavyweight	Kennedy Nzechukwu	def.	Ion Cuțelaba	TKO (knee and punches)	2	1:02
Heavyweight	Waldo Cortes-Acosta	def.	Chase Sherman	Decision (unanimous) (30–27, 29–28, 29–28)	3	5:00
Welterweight	Muslim Salikhov	def.	André Fialho	TKO (spinning wheel kick and punches)	3	1:03
Welterweight	Jack Della Maddalena	def.	Danny Roberts	TKO (punches)	1	3:24
Flyweight	Charles Johnson	def.	Zhalgas Zhumagulov	Decision (split) (29–28, 28–29, 29–28)	3	5:00
Preliminary card (ESPN+)
Women's Flyweight	Jennifer Maia	def.	Maryna Moroz	Decision (unanimous) (30–27, 29–28, 29–28)	3	5:00
Bantamweight	Miles Johns	def.	Vince Morales	Decision (unanimous) (30–27, 29–28, 29–28)	3	5:00
Bantamweight	Ricky Turcios	def.	Kevin Natividad	Decision (split) (29–28, 28–29, 29–28)	3	5:00
Women's Strawweight	Vanessa Demopoulos	def.	Maria Oliveira	Decision (unanimous) (29–28, 29–28, 29–28)	3	5:00
Bantamweight	Brady Hiestand	def.	Fernie Garcia	Decision (unanimous) (29–28, 29–28, 29–28)	3	5:00
Women's Flyweight	Natália Silva	def.	Tereza Bledá	TKO (spinning back kick and punches)	3	1:27

== Bonus awards ==
The following fighters received $50,000 bonuses.

- Fight of the Night: No bonus awarded.
- Performance of the Night: Kennedy Nzechukwu, Muslim Salikhov, Jack Della Maddalena, and Natália Silva

== See also ==
- List of UFC events
- List of current UFC fighters
- 2022 in UFC
