= Mario Bautista =

American mixed martial artist (born 1993)

- Born: Mario Alberto Bautista; July 1, 1993 (age 33); Winnemucca, Nevada, U.S.
- Height: 5 ft 9 in (1.75 m)
- Weight: 135 lb (61 kg; 9 st 9 lb)
- Division: Bantamweight (2017–present); Featherweight (2017)
- Reach: 72 in (183 cm)
- Fighting out of: Scottsdale, Arizona, U.S.
- Team: MMA Lab
- Teacher: Head coach - John Crouch
- Rank: Black belt in Brazilian Jiu-Jitsu under John Crouch
- Years active: 2017–present

Mixed martial arts record
- Total: 21
- Wins: 18
- By knockout: 3
- By submission: 7
- By decision: 8
- Losses: 3
- By knockout: 1
- By submission: 1
- By decision: 1

Other information
- Mixed martial arts record from Sherdog

Mario Alberto Bautista (born July 1, 1993) is an American professional mixed martial artist. He currently competes in the Bantamweight division of the Ultimate Fighting Championship (UFC). As of July 11, 2026, he is #4 in the Meta UFC bantamweight rankings.

== Background ==
Bautista was born and raised in Winnemucca, Nevada. He started wrestling at the age of 14 and competed throughout his high school years prior to his training in jiu-jitsu. Bautista moved from Nevada to Arizona and joined MMA Lab and trained under John Crouch, where he started his professional MMA career in 2012.

== Mixed martial arts career ==
=== Early career ===
Bautista fought in various promotions such as Tachi Palace Fights, Combate Americas, LFA and SMASH Global in regional Arizona and California circuit and amassed a record of 6–0 prior to being signed by the UFC.

=== Ultimate Fighting Championship ===
In his UFC debut, Bautista faced Cory Sandhagen, replacing injured John Lineker, on January 19, 2019, at UFC Fight Night 143. He lost the bout via first round submission.

Bautista faced Jin Soo Son on July 20, 2019, at UFC on ESPN 4. He won the fight via unanimous decision. This fight earned him a Fight of the Night award.

On February 8, 2020, Bautista faced Miles Johns at UFC 247. He won the fight via technical knockout in round two. This win earned him the Performance of the Night award.

Bautista faced Trevin Jones, replacing Randy Costa, on March 6, 2021, at UFC 259. He lost the fight via technical knockout in round two.

Bautista was scheduled to face Guido Cannetti on August 28, 2021, at UFC on ESPN 30. However, Bautista tested positive for COVID-19 and was pulled from the card.

Bautista was scheduled to face Khalid Taha on February 19, 2022, at UFC Fight Night 201. However, Taha had to pull out off the bout due to undisclosed reasons and was replaced by newcomer Jay Perrin. Bautista won the fight via unanimous decision.

Bautista faced Brian Kelleher on June 25, 2022, at UFC on ESPN 38. He won the fight via a rear-naked choke submission in the first round.

Bautista faced Benito Lopez on November 5, 2022, at UFC Fight Night 214. At the weigh-ins, Lopez weighed in at 138.5 pounds, two and a half pounds over the bantamweight non-title fight limit. Lopez will be fined 20% of this individual purse which will go to Bautista. He won the fight via a reverse triangle armbar submission in the first round. This win earned him the Performance of the Night award.

The match between Bautista and Guido Cannetti was rescheduled for UFC Fight Night 221 on March 11, 2023. He won the fight via a rear-naked choke submission in the first round.

Bautista was scheduled to face Cody Garbrandt August 19, 2023, at UFC 292. However, Garbrandt withdrew a week before the event due to injury, and was replaced by Da'Mon Blackshear, who last fought a week before at UFC on ESPN: Luque vs. dos Anjos. Bautista won the fight by unanimous decision. 10 out of 15 media outlets scored it for Blackshear.

Bautista faced Ricky Simón on January 13, 2024, at UFC Fight Night 234. He won by unanimous decision.

Bautista faced former UFC Featherweight Champion José Aldo on October 5, 2024 at UFC 307. Despite being unable to land a takedown after ten attempts, he won the fight by split decision. The MMA media was evenly split, with 9 outlets scoring the bout for Aldo and 9 others for Bautista.

Bautista was scheduled to face Marlon Vera on May 3, 2025, at UFC Fight Night 256. However, for unknown reasons, the bout was moved to UFC 316 and was scheduled to take place on June 7, 2025. In turn, Vera withdrew for unknown reasons and was replaced by promotional newcomer and former Bellator Bantamweight World Champion Patchy Mix. Bautista won the fight by unanimous decision.

Bautista was scheduled to face former UFC Bantamweight Championship challenger Umar Nurmagomedov on October 18, 2025 in the main event at UFC Fight Night 262. However, for unknown reasons, the bout was moved to October 25, 2025 one week later at UFC 321. Bautista lost the fight by unanimous decision.

Bautista faced Vinicius Oliveira on February 7, 2026 in the main event at UFC Fight Night 266. He won the fight via a rear-naked choke submission at the end of the second round. This fight earned him a $100,000 Performance of the Night award.

Bautista faced Cory Sandhagen in a rematch on July 11, 2026 at UFC 329. He won the fight via unanimous decision.

== Championships and accomplishments ==
=== Mixed martial arts ===
- Ultimate Fighting Championship
  - Performance of the Night (Three times) vs. Miles Johns, Benito Lopez and Vinicius Oliveira
  - Fight of the Night (One time) vs. Son Jin-soo
  - Third longest win streak in UFC Bantamweight division history (8)
  - Tied (Raphael Assunção & Sean O'Malley) for sixth most wins in UFC Bantamweight division history (12)
  - Tied (Kyung Ho Kang, Marlon Vera & Aljamain Sterling) for third most submissions in UFC Bantamweight division history (4)

== Mixed martial arts record ==
Professional record breakdown
21 matches	18 wins	3 losses
By knockout	3	1
By submission	7	1
By decision	8	1

Res.	Record	Opponent	Method	Event	Date	Round	Time	Location	Notes
Win	18–3	Cory Sandhagen	Decision (unanimous)	UFC 329	July 11, 2026	3	5:00	Las Vegas, Nevada, United States	
Win	17–3	Vinicius Oliveira	Submission (rear-naked choke)	UFC Fight Night: Bautista vs. Oliveira	February 7, 2026	2	4:46	Las Vegas, Nevada, United States	Performance of the Night.
Loss	16–3	Umar Nurmagomedov	Decision (unanimous)	UFC 321	October 25, 2025	3	5:00	Abu Dhabi, United Arab Emirates	
Win	16–2	Patchy Mix	Decision (unanimous)	UFC 316	June 7, 2025	3	5:00	Newark, New Jersey, United States	
Win	15–2	José Aldo	Decision (split)	UFC 307	October 5, 2024	3	5:00	Salt Lake City, Utah, United States	
Win	14–2	Ricky Simón	Decision (unanimous)	UFC Fight Night: Ankalaev vs. Walker 2	January 13, 2024	3	5:00	Las Vegas, Nevada, United States	
Win	13–2	Da'Mon Blackshear	Decision (unanimous)	UFC 292	August 19, 2023	3	5:00	Boston, Massachusetts, United States	
Win	12–2	Guido Cannetti	Submission (rear-naked choke)	UFC Fight Night: Yan vs. Dvalishvili	March 11, 2023	1	3:18	Las Vegas, Nevada, United States	
Win	11–2	Benito Lopez	Submission (reverse triangle armbar)	UFC Fight Night: Rodriguez vs. Lemos	November 5, 2022	1	4:54	Las Vegas, Nevada, United States	Catchweight (138.5 lb) bout; Lopez missed weight. Performance of the Night.
Win	10–2	Brian Kelleher	Submission (rear-naked choke)	UFC on ESPN: Tsarukyan vs. Gamrot	June 25, 2022	1	2:27	Las Vegas, Nevada, United States	
Win	9–2	Jay Perrin	Decision (unanimous)	UFC Fight Night: Walker vs. Hill	February 19, 2022	3	5:00	Las Vegas, Nevada, United States	
Loss	8–2	Trevin Jones	TKO (punches)	UFC 259	March 6, 2021	2	0:40	Las Vegas, Nevada, United States	
Win	8–1	Miles Johns	TKO (flying knee and punches)	UFC 247	February 8, 2020	2	1:41	Houston, Texas, United States	Performance of the Night.
Win	7–1	Son Jin-soo	Decision (unanimous)	UFC on ESPN: dos Anjos vs. Edwards	July 20, 2019	3	5:00	San Antonio, Texas, United States	Fight of the Night.
Loss	6–1	Cory Sandhagen	Submission (armbar)	UFC Fight Night: Cejudo vs. Dillashaw	January 19, 2019	1	3:31	Brooklyn, New York, United States	
Win	6–0	Juan Pablo Gonzalez	Decision (unanimous)	Combate Americas 26	October 13, 2018	3	5:00	Tucson, Arizona, United States	
Win	5–0	A.J. Robb	Submission (guillotine choke)	LFA 44	June 29, 2018	2	3:30	Phoenix, Arizona, United States	
Win	4–0	Raphael Montini de Lima	TKO (doctor stoppage)	LFA 31	January 19, 2018	2	5:00	Phoenix, Arizona, United States	Return to Bantamweight.
Win	3–0	DeMarcus Brown	Submission (rear-naked choke)	SMASH Global 6	September 28, 2017	1	4:46	Los Angeles, United States	Featherweight debut.
Win	2–0	Devon Chavez	Submission (brabo choke)	Tachi Palace Fights 32	August 3, 2017	2	0:59	Lemoore, California, United States	
Win	1–0	Jesse Orta	TKO (punches)	Iron Boy MMA 6	May 15, 2017	1	1:28	Phoenix, Arizona, United States	Bantamweight debut.

== See also ==
- List of current UFC fighters
- List of male mixed martial artists
