= Roman Salazar =

American mixed martial arts fighter

- Born: February 21, 1988 (age 38); United States
- Other names: El Gallito
- Nationality: American
- Height: 5 ft 7 in (1.70 m)
- Weight: 135 lb (61 kg; 9 st 9 lb)
- Division: Bantamweight; Featherweight
- Reach: 68 in (170 cm)
- Fighting out of: Scottsdale, Arizona, United States
- Team: Fight Ready
- Years active: 2009-present

Mixed martial arts record
- Total: 25
- Wins: 14
- By knockout: 6
- By submission: 3
- By decision: 4
- By disqualification: 1
- Losses: 10
- By knockout: 2
- By submission: 4
- By decision: 4
- No contests: 1

Other information
- Mixed martial arts record from Sherdog

Roman Salazar (born February 21, 1988) is an American professional mixed martial artist currently competing in the Bantamweight division of Bellator.

== Background ==
Born and raised in raised in the small town of Mammoth, Arizona, Salazar worked for a while after finishing high school as a cable technician before shifting his focus to mixed martial arts.

== Mixed martial arts career ==
=== Early career ===
Salazar began competing in amateur fights in 2007 as a lightweight before turning professional in 2009. He competed in several different regional promotions across Arizona where he was able to compile a record of 9 - 2.

On the heels of his first round submission victory over Jose Carbajal in September 2014, Salazar signed with the Ultimate Fighting Championship.

=== Ultimate Fighting Championship ===
Salazar made his promotional debut as a short notice replacement against Mitch Gagnon on October 4, 2014, at UFC Fight Night 54, filling in for an injured Rob Font. He lost the fight via submission in the first round.

Salazar faced Norifumi Yamamoto on February 28, 2015, at UFC 184. The bout was declared a no contest after an accidental eye poke by Yamamoto rendered Salazar unable to continue midway through the second round.

Salazar faced Marlon Vera on August 8, 2015, at UFC Fight Night 73. He lost the fight via submission in the second round and was subsequently released from the promotion.

=== Bellator MMA ===
Salazar faced James Gallagher at Bellator:Dublin on September 27, 2019, but was defeated early in round one by submission (Guillotine choke).

== Championships and accomplishments ==
- Iron Boy MMA
  - IBMMA Bantamweight Championship (one time)

== Mixed martial arts record ==
Professional record breakdown
22 matches	13 wins	8 losses
By knockout	6	2
By submission	3	2
By decision	3	4
By disqualification	1	0
No contests	1	

Res.	Record	Opponent	Method	Event	Date	Round	Time	Location	Notes
Win	14–10 (1)	Cody Huard	KO (kick to the body)	Road to ONE: RUF 41	June 20, 2021	3	2:54	Phoenix, Arizona, United States	
Loss	13–10 (1)	James Gallagher	Submission (guillotine choke)	Bellator 227	September 27, 2019	1	0:35	Dublin, Ireland	Catchweight (140lbs) bout.
Loss	13–9 (1)	Mario Israel	Decision (Split)	LFA 72	July 26, 2019	3	5:00	Phoenix, Arizona, United States	Catchweight (140lbs) bout.
Win	13–8 (1)	Evan DeLong	Decision (Unanimous)	Iron Boy MMA 14	March 30, 2019	3	5:00	Phoenix, Arizona, United States	Won the Vacant IBP Featherweight Championship
Loss	12–8 (1)	Eduardo Alvarado Osuna	TKO (punches)	Combate 22	September 14, 2018	1	4:14	Phoenix, Arizona, United States	Catchweight (140lbs) bout.
Loss	12–7 (1)	Casey Kenney	Decision (unanimous)	LFA 44: Frincu vs. Aguilera	June 29, 2018	3	5:00	Phoenix, Arizona, United States	
Win	12–6 (1)	Federico Betancourt	TKO (punches)	Iron Boy MMA 10	March 24, 2018	2	0:34	Phoenix, Arizona, United States	Won the IBMMA Bantamweight Championship.
Win	11–6 (1)	Joey Trevino	TKO (punches)	Iron Boy MMA 8	September 23, 2017	1	1:28	Phoenix, Arizona, United States	
Loss	10–6 (1)	Ricky Palacios	Decision (split)	Combate 13	April 20, 2017	3	5:00	Tucson, Arizona, United States	Bantamweight bout.
Win	10–5 (1)	Gilberto Aguilar	Decision (unanimous)	WFF: World Fighting Federation 32	November 19, 2016	3	5:00	Chandler, Arizona, United States	Featherweight bout.
Loss	9–5 (1)	Ed West	Decision (unanimous)	Aggression Session 3 - Another One	June 18, 2016	3	5:00	Scottsdale, Arizona, United States	
Loss	9–4 (1)	Marlon Vera	Submission (triangle armbar)	UFC Fight Night: Teixeira vs. Saint Preux	August 8, 2015	2	2:15	Nashville, Tennessee, United States	
NC	9–3 (1)	Norifumi Yamamoto	No Contest (accidental eye poke)	UFC 184	February 28, 2015	2	2:37	Los Angeles, California, United States	Salazar was rendered unable to continue.
Loss	9–3	Mitch Gagnon	Submission (rear-naked choke)	UFC Fight Night: MacDonald vs. Saffiedine	October 4, 2014	1	2:06	Halifax, Nova Scotia, Canada	
Win	9–2	Jose Carbajal	Submission (guillotine choke)	WFF 16	September 20, 2014	1	2:06	Chandler, Arizona, United States	
Win	8–2	Carlos Ochoa	Submission (rear-naked choke)	WFF 14	June 28, 2014	1	2:09	Chandler, Arizona, United States	
Win	7–2	Joe Madrid	Decision (unanimous)	WFF 12	March 1, 2014	3	5:00	Tucson, Arizona, United States	
Win	6–2	Michael Parker	Decision (unanimous)	WFF 11	August 24, 2013	3	5:00	Tucson, Arizona, United States	
Loss	5–2	Anthony Birchak	TKO (punches)	Coalition of Combat - Clash of the Titans	June 2, 2012	3	1:38	Phoenix, Arizona, United States	
Win	5–1	Michael Sharpneck	TKO (punches)	RUF MMA - Cage Rage on the River	March 31, 2012	1	0:31	Parker, Arizona, United States	
Win	4–1	Brett Shoenfelt	DQ (illegal knee)	UPN 3	October 8, 2011	3	1:51	San Manuel, Arizona, United States	
Win	3–1	Ramon Aleman	KO (punch)	UPN 2	April 2, 2011	1	0:20	San Manuel, Arizona, United States	
Win	2–1	Ruben S. Gonzales	TKO (punches)	UPN 1	December 11, 2010	1	2:23	San Manuel, Arizona, United States	
Loss	1–1	Sammy Ciurdar	Decision (split)	WFF 1	April 24, 2010	3	5:00	Tucson, Arizona, United States	
Win	1–0	Robert Gainey	Submission (guillotine choke)	RITC 134	September 11, 2009	2	2:20	Tucson, Arizona, United States	

== See also ==
- List of current UFC fighters
- List of male mixed martial artists
