= Brian Kelleher =

American mixed martial arts fighter

- Born: Brian Matthew Kelleher; August 19, 1986 (age 40); Selden, New York, U.S.
- Nickname: Boom
- Height: 5 ft 6 in (1.68 m)
- Weight: 135 lb (61 kg; 9.6 st)
- Division: Bantamweight; Featherweight
- Reach: 66 in (168 cm)
- Stance: Orthodox
- Fighting out of: Selden, New York, U.S.
- Team: Long Island MMA; 10th Planet Jiu-Jitsu Long Island
- Rank: Brown belt in Brazilian Jiu-Jitsu under Steve Kasten
- Years active: 2011–2024

Mixed martial arts record
- Total: 40
- Wins: 24
- By knockout: 8
- By submission: 10
- By decision: 6
- Losses: 16
- By knockout: 2
- By submission: 9
- By decision: 5

Other information
- Website: briankelleher.com
- Mixed martial arts record from Sherdog

Brian Matthew Kelleher (born August 19, 1986) is an American former professional mixed martial artist. Kelleher competed in the Bantamweight division of the Ultimate Fighting Championship (UFC). A professional competitor from 2011 to 2024, Kelleher has also competed for Bellator and CES MMA.

== Background ==
Kelleher was born on August 19, 1986, in Selden, New York, the son of Matt and Jen Kelleher. Kelleher has an older brother Keith and a younger brother Mak who is also a professional mixed martial artist. Kelleher competed in a variety of sports from a young age including ice hockey, soccer and bowling. He later began combat sport training in 2007.

== Mixed martial arts career ==
=== Ultimate Fighting Championship ===
Kelleher made his promotional debut against Iuri Alcântara on short notice at UFC 212 on June 3, 2017. He won the fight via submission due to a guillotine choke in the first round and was awarded a Performance of the Night bonus.

Kelleher next faced Marlon Vera on July 22, 2017, at UFC on Fox 25. He lost the fight via armbar submission in the first round.

Kelleher faced Damian Stasiak on October 21, 2017, at UFC Fight Night 118. He won the fight via technical knockout in the third round. This win earned him the Fight of the Night award.

Kelleher faced Renan Barão on February 24, 2018, at UFC on Fox 28. He won the fight by unanimous decision.

Kelleher faced John Lineker on May 12, 2018, at UFC 224. He lost the fight via knockout in the third round.

Kelleher was originally scheduled to face Domingo Pilarte on November 3, 2018, at UFC 230. Pilarte was forced to withdraw from the bout, citing an injury, and Kelleher is now slated to face Montel Jackson. At the weigh-ins, Kelleher weight at 137 pounds, 1 pound over the bantamweight non-title fight limit of 136. He was fined 20 percent of his purse, which went to his opponent Jackson. On November 3, it was reported that Kelleher withdrew from the bout due to illness and thus the fight was cancelled. The pairing was left intact and rescheduled for December 29, 2018, at UFC 232. At the weigh-ins, Jackson weighed in at 137 lbs, 1 pound over the non-title fight bantamweight limit of 136 lbs. Jackson was fined 20 percent of his purse to Kelleher and the fight proceeded at catchweight. Kelleher lost the fight via submission in the first round.

Kelleher was scheduled to face Mitch Gagnon on May 4, 2019, at UFC Fight Night 150. However, Kelleher pulled out of the fight on April 10, citing an injury, and he was replaced by promotional newcomer Cole Smith.

As the last fight of his prevailing contract, Kelleher faced Ode' Osbourne at UFC 246 on January 18, 2020. He won the fight via a submission in the first round. This win earned him a Performance of the Night award.

After negotiating a new contract, Kelleher faced Hunter Azure in a featherweight contest on May 13, 2020, at UFC Fight Night: Smith vs. Teixeira. He won the fight via knockout in round two. This fight earned him another Fight of the Night award.

Kelleher faced Cody Stamann on June 6, 2020, at UFC 250. He lost the bout via unanimous decision.

Kelleher was scheduled to face Ricky Simón on September 5, 2020, at UFC Fight Night 176. However, Simón's cornerman tested positive for COVID-19 and he was forced to withdraw from the event, and he was replaced by promotional newcomer Kevin Natividad. In turn, Natividad was pulled from the matchup on the day of the event due to undisclosed reasons, and he was replaced by fellow newcomer Ray Rodriguez, who weighed in as a backup. Kelleher won the fight via a guillotine choke in round one. This win earned him a Performance of the Night award.

The bout against Simón was rescheduled on January 16, 2021, at UFC on ABC 1. However, Kelleher also tested positive on January 1 and was pulled from the bout. He was replaced by newcomer Gaetano Pirello and the bout will take place four days later at UFC on ESPN: Chiesa vs. Magny.

The bout between Kelleher and Ricky Simón was rebooked for the third time and took place at UFC 258 on February 13, 2021. Kelleher lost the fight via unanimous decision.

Kelleher faced Domingo Pilarte on August 21, 2021, at UFC on ESPN: Cannonier vs. Gastelum. He won the fight via unanimous decision.

Kelleher was scheduled to face Saidyokub Kakhramonov on January 15, 2022, at UFC on ESPN 32. However, Kakhramonov withdrew from the bout for undisclosed reason and he was replaced by Kevin Croom. He won the fight via unanimous decision after knocking Croom down once in the first round.

As the first bout of his new four-fight contract, Kelleher faced Umar Nurmagomedov on March 5, 2022, at UFC 272. He lost the fight via a rear naked choke in round one.

Kelleher faced Mario Bautista on June 25, 2022, at UFC on ESPN 38. He lost the fight via a rear-naked choke submission in the first round.

Kelleher was scheduled to face Journey Newson on April 29, 2023, at UFC on ESPN: Song vs. Simón. However, Kelleher pulled out of his bantamweight bout against Journey Newson. He was replaced by Marcus McGhee.

Kelleher faced former UFC Bantamweight Champion Cody Garbrandt on December 16, 2023 at UFC 296. He lost the fight via knockout in the first round.

Kelleher faced Cody Gibson on July 20, 2024, at UFC on ESPN 60. He lost the fight by an arm-triangle choke submission in the first round.

On October 9, 2024, it was reported that Kelleher was removed from the UFC roster.

On February 26, 2025, it was announced that Kelleher had retired from MMA competition.

== Championships and accomplishments ==
- Ultimate Fighting Championship
  - Performance of the Night (Three times) vs. Iuri Alcântara, Ode' Osbourne, and Ray Rodriguez
  - Fight of the Night (Two times) vs. Damian Stasiak and Hunter Azure
  - UFC.com Awards
    - 2017: Ranked #7 Upset of the Year vs. Iuri Alcantara
    - 2018: Ranked #8 Upset of the Year vs. Renan Barão
- Ring of Combat
  - Bantamweight Championship (One time; former)
    - One successful title defense

== Mixed martial arts record ==
Professional record breakdown
| 40 matches | 24 wins | 16 losses |
| By knockout | 8 | 2 |
| By submission | 10 | 9 |
| By decision | 6 | 5 |

| Res. | Record | Opponent | Method | Event | Date | Round | Time | Location | Notes |
|---|---|---|---|---|---|---|---|---|---|
| Loss | 24–16 | Cody Gibson | Submission (arm-triangle choke) | UFC on ESPN: Lemos vs. Jandiroba | July 20, 2024 | 1 | 3:58 | Las Vegas, Nevada, United States | |
| Loss | 24–15 | Cody Garbrandt | KO (punch) | UFC 296 | December 16, 2023 | 1 | 3:42 | Las Vegas, Nevada, United States | |
| Loss | 24–14 | Mario Bautista | Submission (rear-naked choke) | UFC on ESPN: Tsarukyan vs. Gamrot | June 25, 2022 | 1 | 2:27 | Las Vegas, Nevada, United States | Return to Bantamweight. |
| Loss | 24–13 | Umar Nurmagomedov | Submission (rear-naked choke) | UFC 272 | March 5, 2022 | 1 | 3:15 | Las Vegas, Nevada, United States | |
| Win | 24–12 | Kevin Croom | Decision (unanimous) | UFC on ESPN: Kattar vs. Chikadze | January 15, 2022 | 3 | 5:00 | Las Vegas, Nevada, United States | |
| Win | 23–12 | Domingo Pilarte | Decision (unanimous) | UFC on ESPN: Cannonier vs. Gastelum | August 21, 2021 | 3 | 5:00 | Las Vegas, Nevada, United States | Bantamweight bout. |
| Loss | 22–12 | Ricky Simón | Decision (unanimous) | UFC 258 | February 13, 2021 | 3 | 5:00 | Las Vegas, Nevada, United States | |
| Win | 22–11 | Ray Rodriguez | Submission (guillotine choke) | UFC Fight Night: Overeem vs. Sakai | September 5, 2020 | 1 | 0:39 | Las Vegas, Nevada, United States | Performance of the Night. |
| Loss | 21–11 | Cody Stamann | Decision (unanimous) | UFC 250 | June 6, 2020 | 3 | 5:00 | Las Vegas, Nevada, United States | |
| Win | 21–10 | Hunter Azure | KO (punches) | UFC Fight Night: Smith vs. Teixeira | May 13, 2020 | 2 | 3:40 | Jacksonville, Florida, United States | Return to Featherweight. Fight of the Night. |
| Win | 20–10 | Ode' Osbourne | Submission (guillotine choke) | UFC 246 | January 18, 2020 | 1 | 2:49 | Las Vegas, Nevada, United States | Performance of the Night. |
| Loss | 19–10 | Montel Jackson | Submission (D'Arce choke) | UFC 232 | December 29, 2018 | 1 | 1:40 | Inglewood, California, United States | Catchweight (137 lb) bout; Jackson missed weight. |
| Loss | 19–9 | John Lineker | KO (punch) | UFC 224 | May 12, 2018 | 3 | 3:43 | Rio de Janeiro, Brazil | |
| Win | 19–8 | Renan Barão | Decision (unanimous) | UFC on Fox: Emmett vs. Stephens | February 24, 2018 | 3 | 5:00 | Orlando, Florida, United States | |
| Win | 18–8 | Damian Stasiak | TKO (punches) | UFC Fight Night: Cerrone vs. Till | October 21, 2017 | 3 | 3:39 | Gdańsk, Poland | Fight of the Night. |
| Loss | 17–8 | Marlon Vera | Submission (armbar) | UFC on Fox: Weidman vs. Gastelum | July 22, 2017 | 1 | 2:18 | Uniondale, New York, United States | |
| Win | 17–7 | Iuri Alcântara | Submission (guillotine choke) | UFC 212 | June 3, 2017 | 1 | 1:48 | Rio de Janeiro, Brazil | Performance of the Night. |
| Win | 16–7 | Julio Arce | Submission (guillotine choke) | Ring of Combat 54 | March 4, 2016 | 3 | 0:18 | Atlantic City, New Jersey, United States | Defended the Ring of Combat Bantamweight Championship. |
| Win | 15–7 | Josh Robinson | KO (spinning back fist) | Ring of Combat 53 | November 20, 2015 | 3 | 0:24 | Atlantic City, New Jersey, United States | |
| Win | 14–7 | Julio Arce | Decision (majority) | Ring of Combat 52 | September 25, 2015 | 3 | 5:00 | Atlantic City, New Jersey, United States | Won the Ring of Combat Bantamweight Championship. |
| Win | 13–7 | Jay Haas | Submission (guillotine choke) | CCFC 49 | June 6, 2015 | 1 | 4:49 | Bethlehem, Pennsylvania, United States | Catchweight (140 lb) bout. |
| Win | 12–7 | Andre Soukhamthath | Decision (unanimous) | CES MMA 28 | March 13, 2015 | 3 | 5:00 | Lincoln, Rhode Island, United States | Return to Bantamweight. |
| Win | 11–7 | Mark Cherico | Submission (guillotine choke) | Pinnacle FC 9 | November 26, 2014 | 1 | 0:37 | Canonsburg, Pennsylvania, United States | Catchweight (138 lb) bout. |
| Loss | 10–7 | Andy Main | Submission (triangle choke) | CCFC 34 | April 19, 2014 | 1 | 1:26 | Morristown, New Jersey, United States | |
| Win | 10–6 | Lester Caslow | Submission (rear-naked choke) | CCFC 31 | February 8, 2014 | 2 | 1:34 | Atlantic City, New Jersey, United States | |
| Loss | 9–6 | Jeff Smith | Submission (armbar) | CCFC 29 | November 1, 2013 | 2 | 4:39 | King of Prussia, Pennsylvania, United States | Catchweight (155 lb) bout. |
| Loss | 9–5 | Scott Heckman | Decision (unanimous) | CCFC 27 | September 21, 2013 | 3 | 5:00 | King of Prussia, Pennsylvania, United States | |
| Loss | 9–4 | Jimmie Rivera | Decision (unanimous) | Bellator 95 | April 4, 2013 | 3 | 5:00 | Atlantic City, New Jersey, United States | Catchweight (140 lb) bout. |
| Win | 9–3 | Tyler Kahihikolo | Decision (unanimous) | Coalition of Combat | December 1, 2012 | 3 | 5:00 | Phoenix, Arizona, United States | |
| Win | 8–3 | Bill Jones | KO (punch) | WCMMA 1: Portugal vs. USA | September 15, 2012 | 1 | 0:10 | Ledyard, Connecticut, United States | Won the vacant WCMMA Featherweight Championship. |
| Win | 7–3 | Ryan Vaccaro | TKO (flying knee) | Rock Out Knock Out | June 2, 2012 | 2 | 0:56 | Asbury Park, New Jersey, United States | |
| Win | 6–3 | Raphael Chavez | TKO (punches) | CCFC 14 | April 14, 2012 | 2 | 3:41 | Atlantic City, New Jersey, United States | |
| Win | 5–3 | Josh Parker | Submission (rear-naked choke) | NEF: Fight Night 1 | February 11, 2012 | 1 | 4:31 | Lewiston, Maine, United States | |
| Loss | 4–3 | Artur Rofi | Submission (armbar) | CCFC 12 | December 10, 2011 | 1 | 4:57 | Atlantic City, New Jersey, United States | Return to Featherweight. |
| Loss | 4–2 | Claudio Ledesma | Decision (unanimous) | Bellator 54 | October 15, 2011 | 3 | 5:00 | Atlantic City, New Jersey, United States | Catchweight (140 lb) bout. |
| Win | 4–1 | Michael LaDuke | TKO (doctor stoppage) | Ring of Combat 37 | September 9, 2011 | 3 | 3:14 | Atlantic City, New Jersey, United States | |
| Win | 3–1 | Manny Millan | Submission (rear-naked choke) | Xtreme Fight Events: Cage Wars 9 | July 29, 2011 | 1 | 3:34 | Atlantic City, New Jersey, United States | |
| Win | 2–1 | Siyam Yousefi | Submission (guillotine choke) | CCFC 8 | May 20, 2011 | 1 | 2:41 | Atlantic City, New Jersey, United States | Bantamweight debut. |
| Win | 1–1 | Nate Ainsworth | KO (punch) | CZ 37 | April 29, 2011 | 1 | 0:23 | Salem, New Hampshire, United States | Featherweight bout. |
| Loss | 0–1 | Dan Cion | Submission (guillotine choke) | Xtreme Fight Events: Cage Wars 5 | March 11, 2011 | 1 | 4:42 | Chester, Pennsylvania, United States | |

== See also ==
- List of male mixed martial artists
