= Journey Newson =

American mixed martial arts fighter

- Born: March 7, 1989 (age 37); Hayward, California, U.S.
- Height: 5 ft 5 in (1.65 m)
- Weight: 135.5 lb (61 kg; 9 st 10 lb)
- Division: Bantamweight
- Reach: 67.5 in (171 cm)
- Style: Taekwondo, Boxing, Brazilian jiu-jitsu
- Fighting out of: Portland, Oregon
- Team: Impact Jiu Jitsu (2008–present)
- Trainer: Rudy Garza (boxing, 2016–present)
- Rank: Black belt in Brazilian jiu-jitsu Orange belt in Tae Kwon Do
- Years active: 2015–present

Professional boxing record
- Total: 2
- Losses: 1
- Draws: 1

Mixed martial arts record
- Total: 16
- Wins: 10
- By knockout: 3
- By submission: 3
- By decision: 4
- Losses: 5
- By knockout: 2
- By submission: 1
- By decision: 2
- No contests: 1

Other information
- Boxing record from BoxRec
- Mixed martial arts record from Sherdog

Journey Newson (born March 7, 1989) is an American mixed martial artist who competes in the Bantamweight division. A professional since 2015, he is most notable for his time in the Ultimate Fighting Championship.

== Background ==
Newson grew up in the Merced, California area. Due to his mother's drug addiction and despite father's attempts to keep the family together, Journey and his siblings were taken into foster care when he was around the age of seven. He started training Tae Kwon Do around the age of 12. He began training Brazilian jiu-jitsu for self-defense around the age of 20 and shifted to mixed martial arts in a couple of years.

== Mixed martial arts career ==
=== Early career ===
Newson started out his career in 2015, fighting for a variety of regional West Coast organizations, such as Cage Sport and King of the Cage. During this time, he compiled a 9–1 record, capturing the Cage Sport and Prime Fighting Bantamweight titles.

=== Ultimate Fighting Championship ===
Newson made his UFC debut as a late replacement for Sergio Pettis against Ricardo Ramos on June 29, 2019 at UFC on ESPN 3. He lost the fight via unanimous decision.

Newson next faced Domingo Pilarte at UFC 247 on February 8, 2020. He won the fight by TKO within the first minute of the fight. However, on March 25, it was announced by the Texas Department of Licensing and Regulation (TDLR) that Newson had tested positive for marijuana during in-competition drug tests. His victory was overturned to a no contest and he was suspended for 30 days.

Newson was initially scheduled to face Randy Costa on September 26, 2020 at UFC Fight Night: Covington vs. Woodley. However, the event was shifted to take place on September 19, 2020, as UFC 253 was later scheduled for the original date. He lost the fight via knockout in round one.

Newson was scheduled to face Felipe Colares on May 1, 2021 at UFC on ESPN 23. However, Newson withdrew from the bout and was replaced by Luke Sanders.

Newson faced promotional newcomer Fernie Garcia on May 7, 2022 at UFC 274. He won the fight via unanimous decision.

Newson faced Sergey Morozov on December 17, 2022 at UFC Fight Night 216. He lost the fight via unanimous decision.

Newson was scheduled to face Brian Kelleher on April 29, 2023 at UFC on ESPN: Song vs. Simón. However, Kelleher pulled out of the bout and was replaced by Marcus McGhee. He lost the fight via rear-naked choke in round two.

On June 8, it was announced that Newson was not extended a new contract and no longer on the UFC roster.

== Championships and accomplishments ==
- CageSport MMA
  - CageSport Bantamweight Championship (one time)
- Prime Fighting MMA
  - Prime Fighting Bantamweight Championship (one time)

== Mixed martial arts record ==
Professional record breakdown
16 matches	10 wins	5 losses
By knockout	3	2
By submission	3	1
By decision	4	2
No contests	1	

Res.	Record	Opponent	Method	Event	Date	Round	Time	Location	Notes
Loss	10–5 (1)	Marcus McGhee	Submission (rear-naked choke)	UFC on ESPN: Song vs. Simón	April 29, 2023	2	2:03	Las Vegas, Nevada, United States	Catchweight (140 lb) bout.
Loss	10–4 (1)	Sergey Morozov	Decision (unanimous)	UFC Fight Night: Cannonier vs. Strickland	December 17, 2022	3	5:00	Las Vegas, Nevada, United States	
Win	10–3 (1)	Fernie Garcia	Decision (unanimous)	UFC 274	May 7, 2022	3	5:00	Phoenix, Arizona, United States	
Loss	9–3 (1)	Randy Costa	KO (head kick)	UFC Fight Night: Covington vs. Woodley	September 19, 2020	1	0:41	Las Vegas, Nevada, United States	
NC	9–2 (1)	Domingo Pilarte	NC (overturned)	UFC 247	February 8, 2020	1	0:38	Houston, Texas, United States	Originally a TKO (punches) win for Newson; overturned after he tested positive for marijuana.
Loss	9–2	Ricardo Ramos	Decision (unanimous)	UFC on ESPN: Ngannou vs. dos Santos	June 29, 2019	3	5:00	Minneapolis, Minnesota, United States	
Win	9–1	Soslan Abanokov	KO (punch)	Final Fight Championship 36	May 9, 2019	1	1:20	Las Vegas, Nevada, United States	
Win	8–1	Chris SanJose	TKO (punches)	Prime Fighting 11	November 10, 2018	2	4:41	Ridgefield, Washington, United States	Won the Prime Fighting Bantamweight Championship.
Win	7–1	Tycen Lynn	Decision (unanimous)	Combat Games 60	February 17, 2018	3	5:00	Tulalip, Washington, United States	
Win	6–1	Anthony Zender	TKO	CageSport 46	July 15, 2017	2	0:24	Tacoma, Washington, United States	Won the CageSport Bantamweight Championship.
Win	5–1	Jordan Mackin	Submission (rear-naked choke)	CageSport 44	February 25, 2017	3	4:55	Tacoma, Washington, United States	Catchweight (140 lb) bout.
Win	4–1	Anthony Zender	Submission (guillotine choke)	CageSport 43	December 17, 2016	3	1:27	Tacoma, Washington, United States	Catchweight (140 lb) bout.
Loss	3–1	Benito Lopez	KO (punches)	KOTC: Unchallenged	October 8, 2016	1	3:04	Oroville, California, United States	
Win	3–0	Shane Friesz	Decision (unanimous)	Super Fight League 49	May 7, 2016	3	5:00	Tacoma, Washington, United States	
Win	2–0	Justin Hugo	Submission (triangle choke)	Super Fight League 45	December 12, 2015	1	2:17	Tacoma, Washington, United States	
Win	1–0	Damon Wood	Decision (unanimous)	KOTC: Rogue Wave	September 5, 2015	3	5:00	Lincoln City, Oregon, United States	Bantamweight debut.

== Professional boxing record ==
2 fights	0 wins	1 loss
By decision	0	1
Draws	1	

No.	Result	Record	Opponent	Type	Round, time	Date	Location	Notes
2	Draw	0–1–1	(United States) Gerardo Esquivel	MD	4	20 Apr 2019	(United States) Green River Center, Auburn, Texas, US	
1	Loss	0–1	(United States) Carlos Green	SD	4	11 Jan 2019	(United States) Emerald Queen Casino, Tacoma, Washington, US	

== See also ==
- List of male mixed martial artists
