= Montel Jackson =

American mixed martial artist (born 1992)

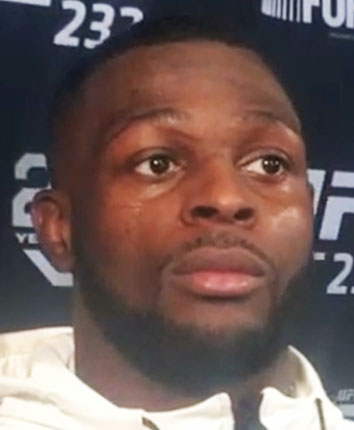
- Jackson at UFC 232 in 2018
- Born: Montel Samuel Jackson; April 24, 1992 (age 34); Milwaukee, Wisconsin, U.S.
- Other names: Quik
- Height: 5 ft 10 in (1.78 m)
- Weight: 136 lb (62 kg; 9 st 10 lb)
- Division: Bantamweight
- Reach: 75.5 in (192 cm)
- Fighting out of: Milwaukee, Wisconsin, U.S.
- Team: Red Schafer MMA; Pura Vida BJJ/MMA
- Rank: Brown belt in Brazilian Jiu-Jitsu
- Years active: 2017–present

Mixed martial arts record
- Total: 20
- Wins: 16
- By knockout: 9
- By submission: 1
- By decision: 6
- Losses: 4
- By decision: 4

Other information
- Mixed martial arts record from Sherdog

Montel Samuel Jackson (born April 24, 1992) is an American professional mixed martial artist. He currently competes in the Bantamweight division of the Ultimate Fighting Championship (UFC). As of October 17, 2026, he is #11 in the Meta UFC bantamweight rankings.

== Background ==
Jackson started training in wrestling at high school to get away from street life as most of his friends ended up in jail or dead. With good results in wrestling, Jackson set his goal to be an Olympic wrestler; however, he chose to stay back and take care of his sick grandparents and turned down the opportunity to wrestle in college. Jackson did an invitational wrestling match, Team USA vs. Team Japan and started training in the Olympic training center in Marquette, Michigan. During this time, one of his friends, Devondrick Bankston, was preparing for a fight against Raufeon Stots, and asked him to help on wrestling drills at Red Schafer MMA gym. At the gym, he met Gato, a Puerto Rican, who managed to talk him into competing in a Brazilian jiu-jitsu tournament without any real class instruction. Eventually, Jackson gave up his Olympic dream and transitioned to mixed martial arts.

== Mixed martial arts career ==
=== Early career ===
Jackson started his professional MMA career in 2017 and fought primarily on the regional circuit in the Midwest United States. He amassed a record of 6–0 before being signed by UFC.

=== Dana White's Tuesday Night Contender Series ===
Jackson faced Rico DiSciullo on June 12, 2018, at Dana White's Contender Series 9. He won the fight via technical knockout on round three.

=== Ultimate Fighting Championship ===
Two months after the win over DiSciullo, Jackson made his promotional debut on 11 day notice, replacing Benito Lopez, on August 4, 2018, against Ricky Simón at UFC 227. He lost the fight by unanimous decision.

Jackson was originally scheduled to face Brian Kelleher on November 3, 2018, at UFC 230, replacing injured Domingo Pilarte. At the weigh-ins, Kelleher weighed-in at 137 pounds, 1 pound over the bantamweight non-title fight limit of 136 pounds. He was fined 20 percent of his purse, which went to Jackson. On November 3, it was reported that Kelleher withdrew from the bout due to illness and thus the fight was cancelled. The pairing was left intact and rescheduled for December 29, 2018, at UFC 232. At the weigh-ins, Jackson weighed in at 137 lbs, 1 pound over the non-title fight bantamweight limit of 136 lbs. Jackson was fined 20 percent of his purse to Kelleher and the fight proceeded at catchweight. Jackson won the fight via submission in the first round.

Jackson faced Andre Soukhamthath on April 13, 2019, at UFC 236. He won the fight by unanimous decision.

Jackson faced Felipe Colares on January 25, 2020, at UFC Fight Night 166. He won the fight via unanimous decision.

Jackson faced Brett Johns on July 19, 2020, at UFC Fight Night 172. Despite knocking Johns down in the first round, Jackson lost the fight via unanimous decision.

Jackson faced Jesse Strader on March 20, 2021, at UFC on ESPN 21. At the weigh-ins, Strader weighed in at 137.5 pounds, one and a half pounds over the bantamweight non-title fight limit. The bout proceeded at a catchweight and Strader was fined 20% of his individual purse, which went his opponent Jackson. After knocking Strader down twice, Jackson won the bout via TKO in the first round.

Jackson was scheduled to face Danaa Batgerel on September 18, 2021, at UFC Fight Night 192. However, Batgerel was pulled from the event due to visa issues and he was replaced by JP Buys. Jackson won the fight by unanimous decision, setting the record for the most knockdowns in a bout in UFC Bantamweight history with four.

Jackson was scheduled to face Danaa Batgerel on March 26, 2022, at UFC Fight Night 205. However, Jackson had to pull out of the bout and was replaced by Chris Gutiérrez.

Jackson faced Julio Arce on November 12, 2022, at UFC 281. He won the fight via unanimous decision.

Jackson faced Rani Yahya on April 22, 2023, at UFC Fight Night 222. He won the fight via knockout in the first round. This performance earned Jackson his first Performance Of The Night award.

Jackson was scheduled to face Chris Gutiérrez on October 7, 2023, at UFC Fight Night 229. However, Jackson withdrew from the bout for undisclosed reasons, and was replaced by Alateng Heili on four days notice.

Jackson was scheduled to face Said Nurmagomedov on June 22, 2024 at UFC on ABC 6. However, Nurmagomedov withdrew from the bout for unknown reasons and was replaced by Farid Basharat. The next month, it was reported that Basharat was unable to compete due to an injury, so the bout was scrapped.

Jackson faced Da'Mon Blackshear on July 13, 2024 at UFC on ESPN 59. He won the fight by knockout eighteen seconds into the first round. This fight earned him another Performance of the Night award.

Jackson faced Daniel Marcos on May 3, 2025 at UFC on ESPN 67. He won the fight by unanimous decision.

Jackson faced Deiveson Figueiredo on October 11, 2025, at UFC Fight Night 261. He lost the fight by split decision.

Jackson faced Raoni Barcelos on April 25, 2026 at UFC Fight Night 274. He lost the fight via split decision. 9 out of 10 media outlets scored the bout for Barcelos.

Jackson faced Ricky Simón in a rematch on September 26, 2026 at UFC Fight Night 289. He won the fight by technical knockout in the second round.

== Championships and accomplishments ==
- Ultimate Fighting Championship
  - Performance of the Night (Two times) vs. Rani Yahya and Da'Mon Blackshear
  - Tied (Marlon Vera) for most knockdowns in UFC Bantamweight division history (14)
    - Tied (Chuck Liddell, Quinton Jackson, Josh Emmett, Cody Garbrandt & Ilia Topuria) for most consecutive fights with a knockdown landed in UFC history (7)
    - Most knockdowns landed in a UFC Bantamweight bout (4) (vs. JP Buys)
    - Second most knockdowns-per-15-minutes in UFC Bantamweight division history (1.69)
  - Second fewest strikes absorbed-per-minute in UFC Bantamweight division history (1.38)
  - Highest takedown accuracy percentage in UFC Bantamweight division history (56.2%)
  - Fourth highest significant strike percentage in UFC Bantamweight division history (1.69)
  - Second fastest knockout/finish in UFC Bantamweight division history (0:18) (vs. Da'Mon Blackshear)

== Mixed martial arts record ==
Professional record breakdown
20 matches	16 wins	4 losses
By knockout	9	0
By submission	1	0
By decision	6	4

Res.	Record	Opponent	Method	Event	Date	Round	Time	Location	Notes
Win	16–4	Ricky Simón	KO (punches)	UFC Fight Night: Rosas Jr. vs. Barcelos	September 26, 2026	2	2:39	Las Vegas, Nevada, United States	
Loss	15–4	Raoni Barcelos	Decision (split)	UFC Fight Night: Sterling vs. Zalal	April 25, 2026	3	5:00	Las Vegas, Nevada, United States	
Loss	15–3	Deiveson Figueiredo	Decision (split)	UFC Fight Night: Oliveira vs. Gamrot	October 11, 2025	3	5:00	Rio de Janeiro, Brazil	
Win	15–2	Daniel Marcos	Decision (unanimous)	UFC on ESPN: Sandhagen vs. Figueiredo	May 3, 2025	3	5:00	Des Moines, Iowa, United States	
Win	14–2	Da'Mon Blackshear	KO (punch)	UFC on ESPN: Namajunas vs. Cortez	July 13, 2024	1	0:18	Denver, Colorado, United States	Performance of the Night.
Win	13–2	Rani Yahya	KO (punches)	UFC Fight Night: Pavlovich vs. Blaydes	April 22, 2023	1	3:42	Las Vegas, Nevada, United States	Performance of the Night.
Win	12–2	Julio Arce	Decision (unanimous)	UFC 281	November 12, 2022	3	5:00	New York City, New York, United States	
Win	11–2	JP Buys	Decision (unanimous)	UFC Fight Night: Smith vs. Spann	September 18, 2021	3	5:00	Las Vegas, Nevada, United States	
Win	10–2	Jesse Strader	TKO (punches)	UFC on ESPN: Brunson vs. Holland	March 20, 2021	1	1:58	Las Vegas, Nevada, United States	Catchweight (137.5 lb) bout; Strader missed weight.
Loss	9–2	Brett Johns	Decision (unanimous)	UFC Fight Night: Figueiredo vs. Benavidez 2	July 19, 2020	3	5:00	Abu Dhabi, United Arab Emirates	
Win	9–1	Felipe Colares	Decision (unanimous)	UFC Fight Night: Blaydes vs. dos Santos	January 25, 2020	3	5:00	Raleigh, North Carolina, United States	
Win	8–1	Andre Soukhamthath	Decision (unanimous)	UFC 236	April 13, 2019	3	5:00	Atlanta, Georgia, United States	
Win	7–1	Brian Kelleher	Submission (brabo choke)	UFC 232	December 29, 2018	1	1:40	Inglewood, California, United States	Catchweight (137 lb) bout; Jackson missed weight.
Loss	6–1	Ricky Simón	Decision (unanimous)	UFC 227	August 4, 2018	3	5:00	Los Angeles, California, United States	
Win	6–0	Rico DiSciullo	TKO (knee and punches)	Dana White's Contender Series 9	June 12, 2018	3	2:15	Las Vegas, Nevada, United States	
Win	5–0	Daron McCant	KO (elbows)	Driller Promotions: A-Town Throwdown 13	March 10, 2018	1	0:57	Austin, Minnesota, United States	
Win	4–0	Jesse Wannemacher	TKO (doctor stoppage)	Driller Promotions: No Mercy 7	February 7, 2018	2	3:16	Mahnomen, Minnesota, United States	
Win	3–0	Terrence Almond	Decision (unanimous)	KOTC: Mercenaries 2	January 13, 2018	3	5:00	Sloan, Iowa, United States	Bantamweight debut.
Win	2–0	Sean Huffman	TKO (punches)	Pure FC: Pure Fight Night 1	August 11, 2017	1	1:08	Milwaukee, Wisconsin, United States	Lightweight debut.
Win	1–0	Josh Wiseman	TKO (punches)	Pure FC 7	June 24, 2017	1	1:44	Milwaukee, Wisconsin, United States	Featherweight debut.

== See also ==
- List of current UFC fighters
- List of Dana White's Contender Series alumni
- List of male mixed martial artists
