= Geraldo de Freitas =

Brazilian mixed martial arts fighter (born 1991)

- Born: Geraldo Augusto de Freitas Jr. September 30, 1991 (age 35); Conselheiro Lafaiete, Brazil
- Nickname: Spartan
- Height: 5 ft 7 in (1.70 m)
- Weight: 135 lb (61 kg; 9 st 9 lb)
- Division: Lightweight; Featherweight; Bantamweight
- Reach: 72 in (183 cm)
- Fighting out of: Rio de Janeiro, Brazil
- Team: Rio Fighters (until 2018); Nova União (2018–present)
- Rank: Black belt in Brazilian jiu-jitsu
- Years active: 2012–present

Mixed martial arts record
- Total: 23
- Wins: 15
- By knockout: 4
- By submission: 7
- By decision: 4
- Losses: 8
- By knockout: 1
- By decision: 7

Other information
- Mixed martial arts record from Sherdog

Geraldo Augusto de Freitas Jr. (born September 30, 1991) is a Brazilian professional mixed martial artist. De Freitas competed in the Bantamweight division of the Ultimate Fighting Championship (UFC).

== Background ==
De Freitas was born and grew up in Conselheiro Lafaiete, Brazil, on September 30, 1991. De Freitas began training Brazilian jiu-jitsu, at the age of 11, picking up muay thai and boxing later on. At the age of 18, de Freitas moved to Belo Horizonte to study a degree in physical education and find better mixed martial arts training. However, de Freitas ended up dropping out of the college and subsequently moving to Rio de Janeiro in pursuit of professional mixed martial arts career.

== Mixed martial arts career ==
=== Early career ===
Starting his career in 2012, de Freitas compiled a 11–4 record fighting for regional Brazilian promotions, most notably for Shooto Brazil, where he won the Bantamweight title by beating Luciano Benicio by decision.

=== Ultimate Fighting Championship ===
De Freitas made his UFC debut in a featherweight bout against Felipe Colares on February 2, 2019 at UFC Fight Night: Assunção vs. Moraes 2. De Freitas won the fight via unanimous decision.

De Freitas faced Chris Gutiérrez on August 10, 2019 at UFC Fight Night: Shevchenko vs. Carmouche 2. De Freitas lost the fight via split decision. 7 out of 11 media scores gave it to de Freitas.

De Freitas was then expected to face Jack Shore at UFC Fight Night: Woodley vs. Edwards on March 21, 2020. However, the whole event was cancelled, due to the COVID-19 pandemic.

De Freitas faced Tony Gravely on November 14, 2020 at UFC Fight Night: Felder vs. dos Anjos. De Freitas lost the fight via split decision. 15 out of 16 media scores gave it to Gravely.

On March 4, 2021, it was announced, that de Freitas was released from the UFC.

=== Post UFC ===
De Freitas made his return for the first time after getting released on July 24, 2021 at Shooto Brazil 107 against Marcos Cordeiro. De Freitas won the bout via armbar in the first round.

On October 13, 2021, USADA announced, that an independent arbitrator has rendered a two-year period of ineligibility for an anti-doping policy violation, that de Freitas committed while he was in the UFC program. De Freitas tested positive for exogenous administration of testosterone and/or its precursors as the result of an out-of-competition drug test collected on October 14, 2020. The two-year period of ineligibility began on January 11, 2021.

De Freitas faced Rogerio Ferreira on November 19, 2022 at MAC 3. De Freitas won the bout via first-round rear-naked submission.

== Personal life ==
De Freitas's nickname "Spartan" is in honor of his friend who died, Igor Silva. Igor was very supportive of de Freitas's dream of becoming a professional MMA fighter. When de Freitas was starting out, they used to watch the “300” movie, and Igor would encourage de Freitas by saying they were Spartan warriors.

== Championships and achievements ==
- Shooto Brazil
  - Shooto Brazil Bantamweight Championship (One Time)

== Mixed martial arts record ==
Professional record breakdown
23 matches	15 wins	8 losses
By knockout	4	1
By submission	7	0
By decision	4	7

Res.	Record	Opponent	Method	Event	Date	Round	Time	Location	Notes
Win	15–9	Rogério Sobrinho	Decision (unanimous)	Shooto Brasil 132	September 19, 2025	3	5:00	Rio de Janeiro, Brazil	
Loss	14–8	Ylies Djiroun	Decision (unanimous)	Ares FC 27	November 23, 2024	3	5:00	Marseille, France	
Loss	14–7	Daguir Imavov	KO (punches)	Ares FC 16	June 23, 2023	1	2:33	Paris, France	Return to Featherweight.
Win	14–6	Luiz Carlos Caetano	Submission (rear-naked choke)	MAC 3	November 19, 2022	1	1:29	Rio de Janeiro, Brazil	
Win	13–6	Marcos Cordeiro	Submission (armlock)	Shooto Brazil 107	July 24, 2021	1	3:12	Rio de Janeiro, Brazil	Catchweight (140 lb) bout.
Loss	12–6	Tony Gravely	Decision (split)	UFC Fight Night: Felder vs. dos Anjos	November 15, 2020	3	5:00	Las Vegas, United States	
Loss	12–5	Chris Gutiérrez	Decision (split)	UFC Fight Night: Shevchenko vs. Carmouche 2	August 10, 2019	3	5:00	Montevideo, Uruguay	
Win	12–4	Felipe Colares	Decision (unanimous)	UFC Fight Night: Assunção vs. Moraes 2	February 2, 2019	3	5:00	Fortaleza, Brazil	Featherweight bout.
Win	11–4	Rafael Rafael	Submission (rear-naked choke)	Shooto Brazil 83	May 11, 2018	1	2:37	Rio de Janeiro, Brazil	
Win	10–4	Luciano Benicio	Decision (unanimous)	Shooto Brazil 74	August 27, 2017	3	5:00	Rio de Janeiro, Brazil	Won the Shooto Brazil Bantamweight Championship.
Win	9–4	Zeilton Rodrigues	Decision (unanimous)	Shooto Brazil 72	May 12, 2017	3	5:00	Rio de Janeiro, Brazil	Catchweight (139 lbs)
Win	8–4	Wallace Portella	Submission (armbar)	Watch Out Combat Show 44	November 5, 2016	1	N/A	Rio de Janeiro, Brazil	
Win	7–4	Fabio Pacheco	KO (punch)	Jungle Fight 88	June 25, 2016	1	1:11	Pocos de Caldas, Brazil	
Win	6–4	Israel Ottoni	Submission (armbar)	Jungle Fight 84	December 5, 2015	1	4:05	São Paulo, Brazil	
Loss	5–4	Denis Silva	Decision (split)	Jungle Fight 82	October 24, 2015	3	5:00	São Paulo, Brazil	
Win	5–3	Peter Montibeller	TKO (doctor stoppage)	Nitrix Champion Fight 23	May 9, 2015	2	5:00	Camboriú, Brazil	
Loss	4–3	Bruno Camargo	Decision (split)	Bitetti Combat 20	June 7, 2014	3	5:00	Armação dos Búzios, Brazil	
Win	4–2	Adonilton Matos	Submission (rear-naked choke)	Bitetti Combat 17	September 6, 2013	2	4:17	Rio de Janeiro, Brazil	Bantamweight debut.
Win	3–2	Julio Cesar	TKO (doctor stoppage)	Luta Contra o Crack: Fight Against Crack	June 23, 2013	3	0:00	Rio de Janeiro, Brazil	
Win	2–2	Gustavo Prado Faquini	Submission (armbar)	Mixed Submission and Strike Arts 3	March 25, 2013	1	4:20	Barra da Tijuca, Brazil	
Loss	1–2	Fred Vieira Rudolph	Decision (unanimous)	Super Fight Lafaiete	September 1, 2012	3	5:00	Conselheiro Lafaiete, Brazil	Featherweight debut.
Loss	1–1	Eliandro Libania	Decision (unanimous)	Shooto Brazil 32	July 14, 2012	3	5:00	Rio de Janeiro, Brazil	
Win	1–0	Uelington Pereira da Silva	TKO (punches)	Minas Fight	May 26, 2012	1	4:19	Conselheiro Lafaiete, Brazil	

== See also ==
- List of male mixed martial artists
