= Chase Hooper =

American mixed martial artist (born 1999)

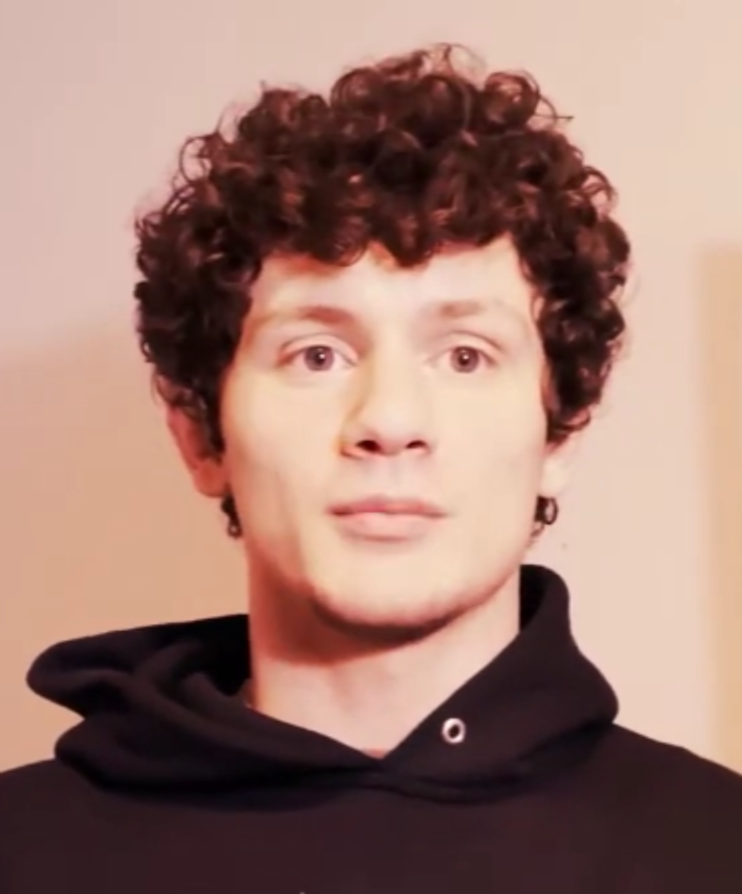
- Hooper in 2022
- Born: Chase Alan Hooper; September 13, 1999 (age 27); Enumclaw, Washington, U.S.
- Other names: The Dream
- Height: 6 ft 1 in (185 cm)
- Weight: 158 lb (72 kg; 11 st 4 lb)
- Division: Lightweight (2017–2018, 2023–present); Featherweight (2018–2022)
- Reach: 74 in (188 cm)
- Fighting out of: Enumclaw, Washington, U.S.
- Team: Combat Sport & Fitness
- Rank: Black belt in Brazilian Jiu-Jitsu
- Years active: 2017–present

Mixed martial arts record
- Total: 23
- Wins: 17
- By knockout: 4
- By submission: 9
- By decision: 4
- Losses: 5
- By knockout: 3
- By decision: 2
- Draws: 1

Amateur record
- Total: 5
- Wins: 5
- By knockout: 1
- By submission: 4

Other information
- Mixed martial arts record from Sherdog

Chase Alan Hooper (born September 13, 1999) is an American mixed martial artist. He currently competes in the Lightweight division of the Ultimate Fighting Championship (UFC).

== Mixed martial arts career ==
Hooper began his amateur MMA career while he was still attending Enumclaw High School. On the regional circuit of Washington, Hooper compiled an undefeated 5–0 record with four stoppage wins before making his professional debut on October 7, 2017, against Edson Penado. Hooper won the fight via rear-naked choke submission in the first round utilizing his heavy skills in Brazilian jiu-jitsu, in which he's a juvenile Pan American champion as a blue belt.

=== Dana White's Contender Series ===
Hooper competed at Dana White's Contender Series 14 against Canaan Kawaihae. He won the fight via unanimous decision and was awarded a development league contract.

He competed in three more fights (winning two of them and the other one ending in a draw) in notable minor promotions such as CFFC and Titan FC before being signed by the UFC.

=== Ultimate Fighting Championship ===
Hooper made his promotional debut against Daniel Teymur on December 14, 2019, at UFC 245. He won the fight via technical knockout in the first round.

Hooper faced Alex Caceres on June 6, 2020, at UFC 250. He lost the fight via unanimous decision, marking his first professional defeat.

Hooper faced Peter Barrett at UFC 256 on December 12, 2020. He earned a comeback win in the third round via heel hook submission.

Hooper faced Steven Peterson on June 12, 2021, at UFC 263. At the weigh-ins, Peterson weighed in at 148.5 pounds, two and a half pounds over the featherweight non-title fight limit. The bout proceeded at catchweight and he was fined 20% of his purse, which went to Hooper. Hooper lost the fight via unanimous decision.

Hooper faced Felipe Colares on May 21, 2022, at UFC Fight Night 206. He won the fight via technical knockout in round three. This win earned him the Performance of the Night award.

Hooper faced Steve Garcia on October 29, 2022, at UFC Fight Night 213. He lost the fight via TKO in the first round.

Hooper faced Nick Fiore on May 20, 2023, at UFC Fight Night 223. He won the fight via unanimous decision.

Hooper faced Jordan Leavitt on November 18, 2023 at UFC Fight Night 232. He won the fight via a rear-naked choke submission in the first round.

Hooper faced Viacheslav Borshchev on May 11, 2024, at UFC on ESPN 56. After knocking down Borshchev in the first round, Hooper won the fight via Brabo choke submission in the second round.

Hooper faced former Strikeforce Lightweight Champion Clay Guida on December 7, 2024 at UFC 310. He won the fight via an armbar submission in the first round. This fight earned him another Performance of the Night award.

Hooper faced Jim Miller on April 12, 2025 at UFC 314. He won the fight by unanimous decision. Following his victory, Hooper expressed disappointment with his performance, stating in the post-fight interview that he "spent too much time gooning this camp."

Hooper faced Alexander Hernandez on August 16, 2025, at UFC 319. He lost the fight via technical knockout in round one.

Hooper faced Lance Gibson Jr. on March 28, 2026 at UFC Fight Night 271. He lost the fight via technical knockout due to knees in the first round.

Hooper faced Mitch Ramirez on July 18, 2026, at UFC Fight Night 281. At the weigh-ins, Hooper weighed in at 157.5 pounds, one and a half pounds over the weight non-title fight limit. The bout proceeded at catchweight and Hooper was fined 20 percent of his purse which went to Ramirez. Hooper won the fight via rear-naked choke in the first round.

Hooper is scheduled to face Chris Padilla on December 12, 2026 at UFC 335.

== Professional grappling career ==
Hooper competed against Renato Moicano at Fury Pro Grappling 3 on December 30, 2021 and lost the match by unanimous decision.

Hooper competed against Clay Guida at Fury Pro Grappling 6 on December 30, 2022, submitting Guida with a calf-slicer.

Hooper competed against Aljamain Sterling in the main event of ADXC 2 on January 19, 2024. He lost the match by split decision.

== Championships and accomplishments ==
=== Mixed martial arts ===
- Ultimate Fighting Championship
  - Performance of the Night (Two times) vs. Felipe Colares and Clay Guida
  - Fourth most total strikes landed in a bout in UFC Lightweight division history (217 vs. Nick Fiore)
  - UFC Honors Awards
    - 2020: Fan's Choice Comeback of the Year Nominee vs. Peter Barrett
- Dominate Fighting Championships
  - Dominate FC Featherweight Championship (One time)
- Rumble on the Ridge
  - Rumble on the Ridge Amateur Featherweight Championship (One time)
- Slacky Awards
  - 2024 Technical Turn-Around of the Year

=== Brazilian Jiu-jitsu ===
- Pan American Championships
  - 2016 Pan American Juvenile Absolute (heavy) runner-up (blue)
  - 2016 Pan American Juvenile Middleweight champion (blue)

== Mixed martial arts record ==
Professional record breakdown
23 matches	17 wins	5 losses
By knockout	4	3
By submission	9	0
By decision	4	2
Draws	1	

Res.	Record	Opponent	Method	Event	Date	Round	Time	Location	Notes
Win	17–5–1	Mitch Ramirez	Submission (rear-naked choke)	UFC Fight Night: du Plessis vs. Usman	July 18, 2026	1	2:15	Oklahoma City, Oklahoma, United States	Catchweight (157.5 lb) bout; Hooper missed weight.
Loss	16–5–1	Lance Gibson Jr.	TKO (knees)	UFC Fight Night: Adesanya vs. Pyfer	March 28, 2026	1	2:56	Seattle, Washington, United States	
Loss	16–4–1	Alexander Hernandez	TKO (punches)	UFC 319	August 16, 2025	1	4:58	Chicago, Illinois, United States	
Win	16–3–1	Jim Miller	Decision (unanimous)	UFC 314	April 12, 2025	3	5:00	Miami, Florida, United States	
Win	15–3–1	Clay Guida	Submission (armbar)	UFC 310	December 7, 2024	1	3:41	Las Vegas, Nevada, United States	Performance of the Night.
Win	14–3–1	Viacheslav Borshchev	Submission (brabo choke)	UFC on ESPN: Lewis vs. Nascimento	May 11, 2024	2	3:00	St. Louis, Missouri, United States	
Win	13–3–1	Jordan Leavitt	Submission (rear-naked choke)	UFC Fight Night: Allen vs. Craig	November 18, 2023	1	2:58	Las Vegas, Nevada, United States	
Win	12–3–1	Nick Fiore	Decision (unanimous)	UFC Fight Night: Dern vs. Hill	May 20, 2023	3	5:00	Las Vegas, Nevada, United States	Return to Lightweight.
Loss	11–3–1	Steve Garcia	TKO (punches)	UFC Fight Night: Kattar vs. Allen	October 29, 2022	1	1:32	Las Vegas, Nevada, United States	
Win	11–2–1	Felipe Colares	TKO (punches)	UFC Fight Night: Holm vs. Vieira	May 21, 2022	3	3:00	Las Vegas, Nevada, United States	Performance of the Night.
Loss	10–2–1	Steven Peterson	Decision (unanimous)	UFC 263	June 12, 2021	3	5:00	Glendale, Arizona, United States	Catchweight (148.5 lb) bout; Peterson missed weight.
Win	10–1–1	Peter Barrett	Submission (heel hook)	UFC 256	December 12, 2020	3	3:02	Las Vegas, Nevada, United States	
Loss	9–1–1	Alex Caceres	Decision (unanimous)	UFC 250	June 6, 2020	3	5:00	Las Vegas, Nevada, United States	
Win	9–0–1	Daniel Teymur	TKO (elbows and punches)	UFC 245	December 14, 2019	1	4:34	Las Vegas, Nevada, United States	
Win	8–0–1	Luis Gomez	Submission (rear-naked choke)	Titan FC 55	June 28, 2019	1	3:31	Fort Lauderdale, Florida, United States	Catchweight (147.8 lb) bout; Gomez missed weight.
Win	7–0–1	Sky Moiseichik	TKO (punches)	Island Fights 54	March 22, 2019	2	3:47	Panama City Beach, Florida, United States	
Draw	6–0–1	Lashawn Alcocks	Draw (split)	Cage Fury FC 71	December 14, 2018	3	5:00	Atlantic City, New Jersey, United States	
Win	6–0	Canaan Kawaihae	Decision (unanimous)	Dana White's Contender Series 14	July 24, 2018	3	5:00	Las Vegas, Nevada, United States	Return to Featherweight.
Win	5–0	Brett Malone	Submission (rear-naked choke)	Combat Games 61	April 21, 2018	2	4:08	Snoqualmie, Washington, United States	Won the COGA Lightweight Championship.
Win	4–0	Drew Brokenshire	Decision (unanimous)	Dominate FC 1	February 24, 2018	5	5:00	Olympia, Washington, United States	Featherweight debut. Won the DFC Featherweight Championship.
Win	3–0	Wyatt Gonzalez	Submission (triangle choke)	CageSport 49	February 10, 2018	1	3:57	Tacoma, Washington, United States	
Win	2–0	Sean Soliz	TKO (punches)	CageSport 48	December 16, 2017	1	3:01	Tacoma, Washington, United States	
Win	1–0	Edson Penado	Submission (rear-naked choke)	Rumble on the Ridge 40	October 7, 2017	1	2:45	Snoqualmie, Washington, United States	Lightweight debut.

== Amateur mixed martial arts record ==
Amateur record breakdown		
5 matches	5 wins	0 losses
By knockout	1	0
By submission	4	0

Res.	Record	Opponent	Method	Event	Date	Round	Time	Location	Notes
Win	5–0	Jorge Alcala	Submission (rear-naked choke)	Summer Showdown 4	August 25, 2017	1	2:45	Tulalip, Washington, United States	
Win	4–0	Gurpal Sahota	Submission (guillotine choke)	Rumble on the Ridge 38	May 20, 2017	1	0:53	Snoqualmie, Washington, United States	Won the Rumble on the Ridge Amateur Featherweight Championship
Win	3–0	Byron Fernandus Jr	Submission (guillotine choke)	Supreme Showdown 2	February 17, 2017	1	0:26	Quil Ceda Village, Washington, United States	
Win	2–0	Luke Main	Submission (rear-naked choke)	Reign FC: MMA Fight Night	November 26, 2016	1	2:15	Suquamish, Washington, United States	
Win	1–0	Patrick Harris	TKO (punches)	Rumble on the Ridge 36	October 1, 2016	1	2:10	Snoqualmie, Washington, United States	

== Submission grappling record ==
3 Matches, 1 Win, 2 losses
Result	Rec.	Opponent	Method	Event	Date	Location
Loss	1–2	(United States) Aljamain Sterling	Decision (split)	ADXC 2	19 January 2024	Abu Dhabi, United Arab Emirates
Win	1–1	(United States) Clay Guida	Submission (calf slicer)	Fury Pro Grappling 6	30 December 2022	Philadelphia, Pennsylvania, United States
Loss	0–1	(Brazil) Renato Moicano	Decision (unanimous)	Fury Pro Grappling 3	30 December 2021	Philadelphia, Pennsylvania, United States

== See also ==
- List of current UFC fighters
- List of Dana White's Contender Series alumni
- List of male mixed martial artists
