= UFC Fight Night: Pavlovich vs. Blaydes =

UFC mixed martial arts event in 2023

- The poster for UFC Fight Night: Pavlovich vs. Blaydes
- Promotion: Ultimate Fighting Championship
- Date: April 22, 2023
- Venue: UFC Apex
- City: Enterprise, Nevada, United States
- Attendance: Not announced

Event chronology
UFC on ESPN: Holloway vs. Allen	UFC Fight Night: Pavlovich vs. Blaydes	UFC on ESPN: Song vs. Simón

UFC Fight Night: Pavlovich vs. Blaydes (also known as UFC Fight Night 222, UFC on ESPN+ 80 and UFC Vegas 71) was a mixed martial arts event produced by the Ultimate Fighting Championship that took place on April 22, 2023, at the UFC Apex facility in Enterprise, Nevada, part of the Las Vegas Metropolitan Area, United States.

== Background ==
A heavyweight bout between Sergei Pavlovich and Curtis Blaydes headlined the event.

A bantamweight bout between Danaa Batgerel and Brady Hiestand was scheduled for UFC on ESPN: Holloway vs. Allen a week earlier. However, the pair was moved to this event for undisclosed reasons.

A women's strawweight bout between Iasmin Lucindo and Melissa Martinez was expected to take place at the event. However, Martinez withdrew from the bout due to an undisclosed reason and was replaced by Brogan Walker-Sanchez.

Rafael Estevam and Carlos Candelario were expected to meet in a flyweight bout at the event. However, Candelario pulled out in mid-April due to injury and Estevam was moved as a replacement against Zhalgas Zhumagulov at UFC 288 on May 6.

A bantamweight bout between Song Yadong and former LFA Bantamweight Champion Ricky Simón was expected to take place at this event. However, the bout was instead delayed a week to headline UFC Fight Night 223 when that event’s original headliner was cancelled.

At the weigh-ins, Priscila Cachoeira and William Gomis missed weight. Cachoeira weighed in at 130 pounds, four pounds over the women's flyweight non-title fight limit. Gomis weighed in at 147 pounds, one pound over the featherweight non-title fight limit. The Gomis-Marshall bout proceeded as a catchweight with Gomis being fined a percentage of his purse, which went to Francis Marshall. Cachoeira's bout against Karine Silva was in turn scrapped.

== Results ==
Main Card (ESPN+)
Weight class				Method	Round	Time	Notes
Heavyweight	Sergei Pavlovich	def.	Curtis Blaydes	TKO (punches)	1	3:08
Middleweight	Bruno Silva	def.	Brad Tavares	TKO (knee and punch)	1	3:35
Lightweight	Bobby Green	vs.	Jared Gordon	No Contest (accidental clash of heads)	1	4:35	(Note: Accidental clash of heads led to Gordon being knocked unconscious.)
Women's Flyweight	Iasmin Lucindo	def.	Brogan Walker	Decision (unanimous) (30–27, 30–27, 30–27)	3	5:00
Welterweight	Jeremiah Wells	def.	Matthew Semelsberger	Decision (split) (30–27, 28–29, 30–27)	3	5:00
Preliminary Card (ESPN+)
Lightweight	Christos Giagos	def.	Ricky Glenn	KO (punch)	1	1:35
Bantamweight	Montel Jackson	def.	Rani Yahya	KO (punches)	1	3:42
Women's Featherweight	Norma Dumont	def.	Karol Rosa	Decision (unanimous) (29–28, 29–28, 29–28)	3	5:00
Heavyweight	Mohammad Usman	def.	Junior Tafa	Decision (unanimous) (29–28, 29–28, 29–28)	3	5:00
Catchweight (147 lb)	William Gomis	def.	Francis Marshall	Decision (split) (29–28, 28–29, 29–28)	3	5:00
Bantamweight	Brady Hiestand	def.	Danaa Batgerel	TKO (punches)	3	4:21

== Bonus awards ==
The following fighters received $50,000 bonuses.

- Fight of the Night: Not awarded.
- Performance of the Night: Sergei Pavlovich, Bruno Silva, Christos Giagos, and Montel Jackson

== See also ==
- List of UFC events
- List of current UFC fighters
- 2023 in UFC
