= Chris Gutiérrez =

American mixed martial artist

- Born: Christopher Gutiérrez; April 22, 1991 (age 35); Greenville, Texas, U.S.
- Other names: El Guapo
- Height: 5 ft 8 in (1.73 m)
- Weight: 136 lb (62 kg; 9 st 10 lb)
- Division: Bantamweight (2013–present); Featherweight (2020)
- Reach: 67 in (170 cm)
- Fighting out of: Englewood, Colorado, U.S.
- Team: Factory X
- Trainer: Marc Montoya
- Rank: Brown belt in Brazilian Jiu-Jitsu under Marc Montoya and Mario Correa
- Years active: 2013–present

Mixed martial arts record
- Total: 31
- Wins: 22
- By knockout: 9
- By submission: 1
- By decision: 12
- Losses: 7
- By submission: 1
- By decision: 6
- Draws: 2

Other information
- Mixed martial arts record from Sherdog

Christopher Gutiérrez (born April 22, 1991) is an American professional mixed martial artist who currently competes in the Bantamweight division of the Ultimate Fighting Championship (UFC).

== Background ==
Gutiérrez is an American born to a Guatemalan mother and a Colombian father. He started training in mixed martial arts in Greenville, Texas under Chop Shop MMA trained by Robert Stucker at the age of 16.

== Mixed martial arts career ==
=== Early career ===
Gutiérrez started fighting MMA professionally in 2013. He has fought under numerous organizations, notably World Series of Fighting and Legacy Fighting Alliance.

=== Ultimate Fighting Championship ===
Gutiérrez made his UFC debut on November 30, 2018, at The Ultimate Fighter 28 Finale against Raoni Barcelos. He lost the fight via a submission.

Gutiérrez's second fight came on March 23, 2019, facing Ryan MacDonald, at UFC Fight Night: Thompson vs. Pettis. He won the fight via unanimous decision.

Gutiérrez faced Geraldo de Freitas on August 10, 2019, at UFC Fight Night: Shevchenko vs. Carmouche 2. He won the fight via a split decision.

Gutiérrez faced Vince Morales on May 30, 2020, at UFC on ESPN: Woodley vs. Burns. Utilising high volume of leg kicks, he won the fight via technical knockout in round two.

Gutiérrez was expected to face Luke Sanders on August 1, 2020, at UFC Fight Night: Brunson vs. Shahbazyan. However, Sanders was removed from the bout in mid-July for undisclosed reasons and replaced by promotional newcomer Cody Durden. The fight ended in a draw.

Gutiérrez faced Andre Ewell on February 13, 2021, at UFC 258. He won the fight via unanimous decision.

Gutiérrez faced Felipe Colares on October 9, 2021, at UFC Fight Night 194. He won the fight via split decision.

Gutiérrez, as a replacement for Montel Jackson, faced Danaa Batgerel on March 26, 2022, at UFC on ESPN 33. He won the fight via spinning backfist TKO in the second round. The win also earned Gutiérrez his first Performance of the Night award.

Gutiérrez faced Frankie Edgar on November 12, 2022, at UFC 281. He won the bout after knocking out Edgar with a knee in the first round.

Gutiérrez faced Pedro Munhoz on April 15, 2023, at UFC on ESPN 44. He lost the fight by unanimous decision.

Gutiérrez was scheduled to face Montel Jackson on October 7, 2023, at UFC Fight Night 229. However, Jackson withdrew from the bout for undisclosed reasons, and was replaced by Alateng Heili on four days notice, with the pairing taking place one week later at UFC Fight Night 230. He won the fight via unanimous decision.

Replacing injured Petr Yan, Gutiérrez was scheduled to headline UFC Fight Night 233 against Song Yadong on December 9, 2023. He lost the fight via unanimous decision.

Gutiérrez was scheduled to face Javid Basharat on August 3, 2024 at UFC on ABC 7. The bout was moved one week later to August 10 at UFC on ESPN 61. One week before the event, Basharat withdrew due to an injury and was replaced by promotional newcomer Quang Le. He won the fight by unanimous decision.

Gutiérrez was scheduled to face Jean Matsumoto on March 8, 2025, at UFC 313. However, Matsumoto was withdrawn from this event in order to serve as a replacement fighter against Rob Font at UFC Fight Night 252 two weeks prior and was replaced by John Castañeda in a featherweight bout. In turn, the pairing was scrapped hours before taking place as Castañeda suffered an undisclosed illness. Gutiérrez's bout with Castañeda was later rescheduled to April 26, 2025 at UFC on ESPN 66. Gutiérrez won the fight by split decision.

Gutiérrez faced Farid Basharat on October 4, 2025, at UFC 320. He lost the fight by unanimous decision.

== Personal life ==
Gutiérrez has a son from his previous relationship.

== Championships and accomplishments ==
=== Mixed martial arts ===
- Ultimate Fighting Championship
  - Performance of the Night (One time) vs. Danaa Batgerel
  - UFC.com Awards
    - 2022: Ranked #8 Knockout of the Year vs. Frankie Edgar
- Sugar Creek Showdown
  - SCS Bantamweight Championship (One time)
    - One successful title defense
- World Fighting Championships
  - WFC Bantamweight Championship (One time)

== Mixed martial arts record ==
Professional record breakdown
31 matches	22 wins	7 losses
By knockout	9	0
By submission	1	1
By decision	12	6
Draws	2	

Res.	Record	Opponent	Method	Event	Date	Round	Time	Location	Notes
Loss	22–7–2	Farid Basharat	Decision (unanimous)	UFC 320	October 4, 2025	3	5:00	Las Vegas, Nevada, United States	
Win	22–6–2	John Castañeda	Decision (split)	UFC on ESPN: Machado Garry vs. Prates	April 26, 2025	3	5:00	Kansas City, Missouri, United States	Featherweight bout.
Win	21–6–2	Quang Le	Decision (unanimous)	UFC on ESPN: Tybura vs. Spivac 2	August 10, 2024	3	5:00	Las Vegas, Nevada, United States	
Loss	20–6–2	Song Yadong	Decision (unanimous)	UFC Fight Night: Song vs. Gutiérrez	December 9, 2023	5	5:00	Las Vegas, Nevada, United States	
Win	20–5–2	Alateng Heili	Decision (unanimous)	UFC Fight Night: Yusuff vs. Barboza	October 14, 2023	3	5:00	Las Vegas, Nevada, United States	
Loss	19–5–2	Pedro Munhoz	Decision (unanimous)	UFC on ESPN: Holloway vs. Allen	April 15, 2023	3	5:00	Kansas City, Missouri, United States	
Win	19–4–2	Frankie Edgar	KO (knee)	UFC 281	November 12, 2022	1	2:01	New York City, New York, United States	
Win	18–4–2	Danaa Batgerel	TKO (spinning backfist and elbows)	UFC on ESPN: Blaydes vs. Daukaus	March 26, 2022	2	2:34	Columbus, Ohio, United States	Performance of the Night.
Win	17–4–2	Felipe Colares	Decision (split)	UFC Fight Night: Dern vs. Rodriguez	October 9, 2021	3	5:00	Las Vegas, Nevada, United States	
Win	16–4–2	Andre Ewell	Decision (unanimous)	UFC 258	February 13, 2021	3	5:00	Las Vegas, Nevada, United States	Catchweight (140 lb) bout.
Draw	15–4–2	Cody Durden	Draw (unanimous)	UFC Fight Night: Brunson vs. Shahbazyan	August 1, 2020	3	5:00	Las Vegas, Nevada, United States	Return to Bantamweight.
Win	15–4–1	Vince Morales	TKO (leg kicks)	UFC on ESPN: Woodley vs. Burns	May 30, 2020	2	4:27	Las Vegas, Nevada, United States	Featherweight debut.
Win	14–4–1	Geraldo de Freitas	Decision (split)	UFC Fight Night: Shevchenko vs. Carmouche 2	August 10, 2019	3	5:00	Montevideo, Uruguay	
Win	13–4–1	Ryan MacDonald	Decision (unanimous)	UFC Fight Night: Thompson vs. Pettis	March 23, 2019	3	5:00	Nashville, Tennessee, United States	
Loss	12–4–1	Raoni Barcelos	Submission (rear-naked choke)	The Ultimate Fighter: Heavy Hitters Finale	November 30, 2018	2	4:12	Las Vegas, Nevada, United States	
Win	12–3–1	Ray Rodriguez	Submission (rear-naked choke)	LFA 52	October 19, 2018	1	4:47	Belton, Texas, United States	
Win	11–3–1	Jimmy Flick	TKO (leg kicks)	Xtreme Fight Night 347	April 6, 2018	3	2:59	Tulsa, Oklahoma, United States	
Win	10–3–1	Mario Israel	Decision (split)	LFA 22	September 8, 2017	3	5:00	Broomfield, Colorado, United States	Catchweight (140 lb) bout.
Loss	9–3–1	Jerrod Sanders	Decision (unanimous)	C3 Fights: Fight Night	July 22, 2017	3	5:00	Newkirk, Oklahoma, United States	
Loss	9–2–1	Timur Valiev	Decision (unanimous)	WSOF 33	October 7, 2016	3	5:00	Kansas City, Missouri, United States	
Win	9–1–1	Timur Valiev	Decision (split)	WSOF 28	February 20, 2016	3	5:00	Garden Grove, California, United States	
Win	8–1–1	Bendy Casimir	Decision (unanimous)	Sugar Creek Showdown 27	August 22, 2015	5	5:00	Hinton, Oklahoma, United States	Defended the SCS Bantamweight Championship.
Win	7–1–1	Aaron Phillips	TKO (retirement)	WFC 35	February 28, 2015	3	5:00	Baton Rouge, Louisiana, United States	Won the vacant WFC Bantamweight Championship.
Win	6–1–1	Craig Ross	TKO (punches)	Sugar Creek Showdown 23	November 15, 2014	1	0:42	Hinton, Oklahoma, United States	Won the vacant SCS Bantamweight Championship.
Win	5–1–1	Tyler Shinn	Decision (split)	BattleGrounds MMA 5	October 3, 2014	3	5:00	Tulsa, Oklahoma, United States	
Win	4–1–1	Evan Woolsey	Decision (unanimous)	Black Gold Promotions: Battle at the Fort 9	April 5, 2014	3	5:00	Hays, Kansas, United States	
Win	3–1–1	Justin McNally	TKO (punches)	Bellator 111	March 7, 2014	1	2:50	Thackerville, Oklahoma, United States	
Draw	2–1–1	Brandon Seyler	Draw (majority)	Xtreme Knockout 20	November 23, 2013	3	3:00	Arlington, Texas, United States	
Loss	2–1	Jake Constant	Decision (split)	C3 Fights: Fall Brawl 2013	October 12, 2013	3	5:00	Newkirk, Oklahoma, United States	
Win	2–0	Tristan Grimsley	TKO (punches)	Xtreme Knockout 19	August 17, 2013	2	0:19	Dallas, Texas, United States	Bantamweight debut.
Win	1–0	Dawond Pickney	TKO (punches)	Ring Rulers: Spa City Stomp Out Hunger	May 15, 2013	3	1:51	Hot Springs, Arkansas, United States	Catchweight (151 lb) bout.

== See also ==
- List of current UFC fighters
- List of male mixed martial artists
