= UFC on ESPN: Reyes vs. Procházka =

Mixed martial arts event in 2021

- The poster for UFC on ESPN: Reyes vs. Procházka
- Promotion: Ultimate Fighting Championship
- Date: May 1, 2021
- Venue: UFC Apex
- City: Enterprise, Nevada, United States
- Attendance: None (behind closed doors)

Event chronology
| UFC 261: Usman vs. Masvidal 2 | UFC on ESPN: Reyes vs. Procházka | UFC on ESPN: Rodriguez vs. Waterson |

UFC on ESPN: Reyes vs. Procházka (also known as UFC on ESPN 23 and UFC Vegas 25) was a mixed martial arts event produced by the Ultimate Fighting Championship that took place on May 1, 2021 at the UFC Apex facility in Enterprise, Nevada, part of the Las Vegas Metropolitan Area, United States.

== Background ==
A light heavyweight bout between former UFC Light Heavyweight Championship challenger Dominick Reyes and former Rizin Light Heavyweight Champion Jiří Procházka served as the main event. The pairing was initially expected to take place as the headliner on February 27, but they were rescheduled after Reyes had been forced from the contest with an injury.

A welterweight bout between Mike Jackson and Dean Barry was briefly linked to UFC on ESPN: Chiesa vs. Magny in January, but it was pulled due to undisclosed reasons. They were then expected to meet at this event before being rescheduled once again.

Gavin Tucker was briefly linked to a bout with Cub Swanson at the event. However, Tucker was tabbed as a short notice replacement to face Dan Ige at UFC Fight Night: Edwards vs. Muhammad instead. Swanson faced Giga Chikadze instead.

A bantamweight bout between Merab Dvalishvili and Cody Stamann has been rescheduled for a third time and took place at the event. The pairing was first scheduled to meet in last December at UFC on ESPN: Hermansson vs. Vettori, but Stamann pulled out due to undisclosed reasons and the bout was scrapped. They were then rescheduled for UFC Fight Night: Overeem vs. Volkov in February, but Dvalishvili hadn't recovered from COVID-19 and had to pull out.

A women's strawweight bout between Ji Yeon Kim and Poliana Botelho was scheduled for the preliminary portion of the card. However, Kim pulled out of the fight on March 22 citing injury and was replaced by Mayra Bueno Silva. Botelho then suffered another opponent change as Bueno suffered a back injury in late March. On March 31, Luana Carolina was announced as her new opponent.

Randa Markos was expected to face promotional newcomer Luana Pinheiro in a women's strawweight bout at UFC 260, but had to pull out after testing positive for COVID-19. The pairing was left intact and rescheduled for this event.

T.J. Laramie and Damon Jackson were expected to meet in a featherweight bout at the event. However in late March, Laramie pulled out of the fight due to undisclosed reasons and was replaced by Luke Sanders. On April 22, it was Jackson that pulled out due to an injury. Journey Newson, who was expected to face Felipe Colares in a bantamweight bout, also pulled out due to injury. The promotion decided to match Sanders and Corales as a result of those removals.

Augusto Sakai and Shamil Abdurakhimov were expected to meet in a heavyweight bout at the event. However, Abdurakhimov pulled out of the bout due to visa issues, prompting the UFC to book Sakai against Jairzinho Rozenstruik as the headliner at UFC Fight Night 189.

A light heavyweight bout between Ion Cuțelaba and Devin Clark was scheduled for the event. However, Clark pulled out from the event citing an injury and was replaced by Dustin Jacoby.

At the weigh-ins, Luana Carolina and Gabriel Benítez missed weight for their respective bouts. Carolina weighed in 128.5 pounds, 2.5 pounds over the women’s flyweight non-title limit. Her bout proceeded at catchweight and she was fined 20% of her purse which went to Botelho. Benítez weighed in at 150.5 pounds, 4.5 pounds over the featherweight non-title limit. His opponent Jonathan Pearce turned down the fight due to the weight miss and the bout was scrapped.

== Results ==
Main card (ESPN2 / ESPN+)
| Weight class | | | | Method | Round | Time | Notes |
|---|---|---|---|---|---|---|---|
| Light Heavyweight | Jiří Procházka | def. | Dominick Reyes | KO (spinning back elbow) | 2 | 4:29 |
| Featherweight | Giga Chikadze | def. | Cub Swanson | TKO (body kick and punches) | 1 | 1:03 |
| Light Heavyweight | Ion Cuțelaba | vs. | Dustin Jacoby | Draw (split) (28–29, 29–28, 28–28) | 3 | 5:00 |
| Middleweight | Sean Strickland | def. | Krzysztof Jotko | Decision (unanimous) (30–27, 30–27, 29–28) | 3 | 5:00 |
| Bantamweight | Merab Dvalishvili | def. | Cody Stamann | Decision (unanimous) (30–27, 29–28, 29–28) | 3 | 5:00 |
Preliminary card (ESPN2 / ESPN+)
| Women’s Strawweight | Luana Pinheiro | def. | Randa Markos | DQ (illegal upkick) | 1 | 4:16 |
| Featherweight | T.J. Brown | def. | Kai Kamaka III | Decision (split) (27–30, 29–28, 29–28) | 3 | 5:00 |
| Catchweight (128.5 lb) | Luana Carolina | def. | Poliana Botelho | Decision (split) (29–28, 28–29, 29–28) | 3 | 5:00 |
| Women’s Strawweight | Loma Lookboonmee | def. | Sam Hughes | Decision (unanimous) (29–28, 29–28, 29–28) | 3 | 5:00 |
| Middleweight | Andreas Michailidis | def. | KB Bhullar | Decision (unanimous) (30–27, 30–27, 29–28) | 3 | 5:00 |
| Featherweight | Felipe Colares | def. | Luke Sanders | Decision (unanimous) (29–28, 29–28, 29–28) | 3 | 5:00 |

== Bonus awards ==
The following fighters received $50,000 bonuses.

- Fight of the Night: Jiří Procházka vs. Dominick Reyes
- Performance of the Night: Jiří Procházka and Giga Chikadze

== See also ==
- List of UFC events
- List of current UFC fighters
- 2021 in UFC
