= UFC on ESPN: Luque vs. dos Anjos =

UFC mixed martial arts event in 2023

- The poster for UFC on ESPN: Luque vs. dos Anjos
- Promotion: Ultimate Fighting Championship
- Date: August 12, 2023
- Venue: UFC Apex
- City: Enterprise, Nevada, United States
- Attendance: Not announced

Event chronology
UFC on ESPN: Sandhagen vs. Font	UFC on ESPN: Luque vs. dos Anjos	UFC 292: Sterling vs. O'Malley

UFC on ESPN: Luque vs. dos Anjos (also known as UFC on ESPN 51 and UFC Vegas 78) was a mixed martial arts event produced by the Ultimate Fighting Championship that took place on August 12, 2023, at the UFC Apex facility in Enterprise, Nevada, part of the Las Vegas Metropolitan Area, United States.

== Background ==
A welterweight bout between former UFC Lightweight Champion Rafael dos Anjos and Vicente Luque was briefly rumored to headline UFC Fight Night: Holm vs. Bueno Silva. However, the pair was moved to this date and served as the headliner.

Chris Daukaus was expected to make his light heavyweight debut against Khalil Rountree Jr. at UFC 289, but withdrew in early June due to injury. The bout was rescheduled for this event.

A bantamweight bout between Gaston Bolaños and Marcus McGhee was scheduled for this event. However, Bolaños withdrew due to undisclosed reasons and was replaced by JP Buys.

Mike Breeden was expected to face Lando Vannata in a lightweight bout at the event. However, Vannata pulled out in early August and was replaced by Terrance McKinney.

Da'Mon Blackshear was expected to face Brady Hiestand in a bantamweight bout at the event. However, Hiestand pulled out in early August due to a medical issue and was replaced by Dana White's Contender Series alum Jose Johnson.

At the weigh-ins, Tafon Nchukwi and Josh Fremd missed weight. Nchukwi weighed in at 189.5 pounds and Fremd weighed in at 189 pounds, three and a half pounds and three pounds over the middleweight non-title fight limit respectively. Both of their bouts proceeded at catchweight and each was fined an undisclosed percentage of their purse, which went to their opponents A.J. Dobson and Jamie Pickett respectively.

== Results ==
Main card (ESPN / ESPN+)
Weight class				Method	Round	Time	Notes
Welterweight	Vicente Luque	def.	Rafael dos Anjos	Decision (unanimous) (49–46, 48–47, 48–47)	5	5:00
Featherweight	Cub Swanson	def.	Hakeem Dawodu	Decision (unanimous) (29–28, 29–28, 29–28)	3	5:00
Light Heavyweight	Khalil Rountree Jr.	def.	Chris Daukaus	TKO (punches)	1	2:40
Women's Strawweight	Iasmin Lucindo	def.	Polyana Viana	Submission (arm-triangle choke)	2	3:42
Catchweight (189.5 lb)	A.J. Dobson	def.	Tafon Nchukwi	Decision (unanimous) (29–28, 29–28, 29–28)	3	5:00
Catchweight (189 lb)	Josh Fremd	def.	Jamie Pickett	Decision (unanimous) (30–27, 30–27, 30–27)	3	5:00
Preliminary card (ESPN / ESPN+)
Bantamweight	Marcus McGhee	def.	JP Buys	KO (punch)	1	2:19
Lightweight	Terrance McKinney	def.	Mike Breeden	TKO (punches)	1	1:25
Featherweight	Isaac Dulgarian	def.	Francis Marshall	TKO (elbows)	1	4:48
Heavyweight	Martin Buday	def.	Josh Parisian	Submission (kimura)	1	4:11
Women's Strawweight	Jaqueline Amorim	def.	Montserrat Ruiz	TKO (elbows and punches)	3	3:41
Bantamweight	Da'Mon Blackshear	def.	Jose Johnson	Submission (twister)	1	3:47
Women's Flyweight	Luana Santos	def.	Juliana Miller	TKO (punches)	1	3:41

== Bonus awards ==
The following fighters received $50,000 bonuses.

- Fight of the Night: No bonus awarded.
- Performance of the Night: Khalil Rountree Jr., Iasmin Lucindo, Marcus McGhee, and Da'Mon Blackshear

== Aftermath ==
With seven first-round finishes, this event ties the record for most first-round finishes in a single UFC event.

== See also ==
- List of UFC events
- List of current UFC fighters
- 2023 in UFC
