= UFC Fight Night: Kattar vs. Allen =

UFC mixed martial arts event in 2022

- The poster for UFC Fight Night: Kattar vs. Allen
- Promotion: Ultimate Fighting Championship
- Date: October 29, 2022
- Venue: UFC Apex
- City: Enterprise, Nevada, United States
- Attendance: Not announced

Event chronology
UFC 280: Oliveira vs. Makhachev	UFC Fight Night: Kattar vs. Allen	UFC Fight Night: Rodriguez vs. Lemos

UFC Fight Night: Kattar vs. Allen (also known as UFC Fight Night 213, UFC on ESPN+ 71 and UFC Vegas 63) was a mixed martial arts event produced by the Ultimate Fighting Championship that took place on October 29, 2022, at the UFC Apex facility in Enterprise, Nevada, part of the Las Vegas Metropolitan Area, United States.

== Background ==
A featherweight bout between Arnold Allen and Calvin Kattar headlined the event.

A featherweight bout between Ilia Topuria and Edson Barboza was expected to take place at the event. However, Barboza withdrew in late September due to a knee injury and the bout was scrapped.

Drakkar Klose was expected to face 2016 Olympic silver medalist in wrestling Mark Madsen in a lightweight bout. However, Klose pulled out in mid-October due to an anterior cruciate ligament injury. He was replaced by Grant Dawson and the bout was moved to UFC Fight Night: Rodriguez vs. Lemos a week later.

Garrett Armfield and Christian Rodriguez were expected to meet in a bantamweight bout at the preliminary portion of the card. However, Armfield pulled out on fight week due to a staph infection. He was replaced by Joshua Weems. At the weigh-ins, Weems weighed in at 139.5 pounds, three and a half pounds over the bantamweight non-title fight limit. The bout proceeded at catchweight and he was fined 30% of his purse, which went to Rodriguez.

Cody Durden was expected to face Kleydson Rodrigues on the card. However, Rodrigues withdrew from the bout and was replaced by LFA Flyweight Champion Carlos Mota on four days notice.

== Results ==
Main card (ESPN+)
Weight class				Method	Round	Time	Notes
Featherweight	Arnold Allen	def.	Calvin Kattar	TKO (knee injury)	2	0:08
Welterweight	Max Griffin	def.	Tim Means	Decision (split) (29–28, 28–29, 30–27)	3	5:00
Heavyweight	Waldo Cortes-Acosta	def.	Jared Vanderaa	Decision (unanimous) (30–27, 29–28, 29–28)	3	5:00
Middleweight	Tresean Gore	def.	Josh Fremd	Technical Submission (guillotine choke)	2	0:49
Light Heavyweight	Khalil Rountree Jr.	def.	Dustin Jacoby	Decision (split) (29–28, 28–29, 29–28)	3	5:00
Preliminary card (ESPN+)
Middleweight	Roman Dolidze	def.	Phil Hawes	KO (punches)	1	4:09
Heavyweight	Marcos Rogério de Lima	def.	Andrei Arlovski	Submission (rear-naked choke)	1	1:50
Middleweight	Jun Yong Park	def.	Joseph Holmes	Submission (rear-naked choke)	2	3:04
Featherweight	Steve Garcia	def.	Chase Hooper	TKO (punches)	1	1:32
Flyweight	Cody Durden	def.	Carlos Mota	Decision (unanimous) (30–27, 29–28, 29–28)	3	5:00
Catchweight (139.5 lb)	Christian Rodriguez	def.	Joshua Weems	Submission (anaconda choke)	1	4:07

== Bonus awards ==
The following fighters received $50,000 bonuses.

- Fight of the Night: No bonus awarded.
- Performance of the Night: Tresean Gore, Roman Dolidze, Steve Garcia and Christian Rodriguez

== See also ==
- List of UFC events
- List of current UFC fighters
- 2022 in UFC
