= UFC on ESPN: dos Anjos vs. Edwards =

UFC mixed martial arts event in 2019

- The poster for UFC on ESPN: dos Anjos vs. Edwards
- Promotion: Ultimate Fighting Championship
- Date: July 20, 2019
- Venue: AT&T Center
- City: San Antonio, Texas
- Attendance: 9,255
- Total gate: $841,820.61

Event chronology
UFC Fight Night: de Randamie vs. Ladd	UFC on ESPN: dos Anjos vs. Edwards	UFC 240: Holloway vs. Edgar

UFC on ESPN: dos Anjos vs. Edwards (also known as UFC on ESPN 4) was a mixed martial arts event produced by the Ultimate Fighting Championship that took place on July 20, 2019, at the AT&T Center in San Antonio, Texas.

== Background ==
The event marked the promotion's second visit to San Antonio and first since UFC Fight Night: Swanson vs. Stephens in June 2014.

A welterweight bout between former UFC Lightweight Champion Rafael dos Anjos and Leon Edwards was the event headliner.

Alexey Oleynik was expected to face Walt Harris on May 4, 2019, at UFC Fight Night: Iaquinta vs. Cowboy. However, Oleinik was pulled from the pairing with Harris on April 3 and instead faced Alistair Overeem at UFC Fight Night: Overeem vs. Oleinik after former Bellator Heavyweight Champion Alexander Volkov had to withdraw. The pairing was rescheduled for this event.

A lightweight bout between Alexander Hernandez and Francisco Trinaldo has also been rescheduled for the event. The pairing was first expected to take place on January 26, 2019, at UFC 233. However, Hernandez was pulled from that fight in favor of a bout with former lightweight title challenger Donald Cerrone a week earlier at UFC Fight Night: Cejudo vs. Dillashaw.

A women's flyweight bout between former UFC Women's Bantamweight Championship challenger Liz Carmouche and former UFC Women's Flyweight Championship challenger Roxanne Modafferi was scheduled for the event. However, Carmouche was pulled from that bout in favor of a rematch with current champion Valentina Shevchenko in August at UFC Fight Night: Shevchenko vs. Carmouche. Modafferi is now expected to face former Invicta FC Flyweight Champion Jennifer Maia in a rematch of their 2016 bout, which Maia won via split decision to defend the title. At the weigh-ins, Maia weighed in at 129 pounds, 3 pounds over the women's flyweight non-title fight limit of 126. As a result, Maia was fined 30 percent of her purse, and the bout proceeded as scheduled at a catchweight.

== Results ==
Main card (ESPN)
Weight class				Method	Round	Time	Notes
Welterweight	Leon Edwards	def.	Rafael dos Anjos	Decision (unanimous) (50–45, 49–46, 49–46)	5	5:00
Heavyweight	Walt Harris	def.	Alexey Oleynik	KO (knee and punches)	1	0:12
Heavyweight	Greg Hardy	def.	Juan Adams	TKO (punches)	1	0:45
Lightweight	Dan Hooker	def.	James Vick	KO (punches)	1	2:33
Lightweight	Alexander Hernandez	def.	Francisco Trinaldo	Decision (unanimous) (30–27, 30–27, 29–28)	3	5:00
Heavyweight	Andrei Arlovski	def.	Ben Rothwell	Decision (unanimous) (30–27, 30–27, 30–27)	3	5:00
Preliminary card (ESPN)
Featherweight	Alex Caceres	def.	Steven Peterson	Decision (unanimous) (30–27, 29–28, 29–28)	3	5:00
Women's Bantamweight	Raquel Pennington	def.	Irene Aldana	Decision (split) (28–29, 29–28, 29–28)	3	5:00
Light Heavyweight	Klidson Abreu	def.	Sam Alvey	Decision (unanimous) (30–27, 30–27, 29–28)	3	5:00
Catchweight (129 lb)	Jennifer Maia	def.	Roxanne Modafferi	Decision (unanimous) (30–27, 30–27, 30–27)	3	5:00
Bantamweight	Ray Borg	def.	Gabriel Silva	Decision (unanimous) (29–28, 29–28, 29–28)	3	5:00
Bantamweight	Mario Bautista	def.	Jin Soo Son	Decision (unanimous) (30–27, 30–27, 29–28)	3	5:00
Bantamweight	Felipe Colares	def.	Domingo Pilarte	Decision (split) (29–28, 28–29, 29–28)	3	5:00

== Bonus awards ==
The following fighters received $50,000 bonuses.

- Fight of the Night: Mario Bautista vs. Jin Soo Son
- Performance of the Night: Walt Harris and Dan Hooker

== Records set ==
With a total of ten (10) decisions on the card, the event tied UFC 169, UFC Fight Night: Machida vs. Mousasi, UFC Fight Night: Silva vs. Bisping, UFC Fight Night: Whittaker vs. Brunson, UFC Fight Night: Werdum vs. Tybura and later UFC Fight Night: Vieira vs. Tate and UFC on ABC: Hill vs. Rountree Jr. for the most decisions at a single UFC event. The record was later broken by UFC 263 in 2021, which had eleven decision bouts.

Nine consecutive decisions was also a new UFC single-event record.

== See also ==
- List of UFC events
- 2019 in UFC
- List of current UFC fighters
