= JP Buys =

South African mixed martial artist

- Born: 22 April 1996 (age 30); Brakpan, South Africa
- Other names: Young Savage
- Height: 5 ft 6 in (168 cm)
- Weight: 135 lb (61 kg; 9 st 9 lb)
- Division: Flyweight, Bantamweight
- Style: Wrestling, Grappling
- Stance: Orthodox
- Team: Xtreme Couture
- Rank: Black belt in Brazilian Jiu-Jitsu
- Years active: 2015–present

Mixed martial arts record
- Total: 15
- Wins: 9
- By knockout: 3
- By submission: 5
- Losses: 6
- By knockout: 4
- By submission: 1
- By decision: 1

Other information
- Mixed martial arts record from Sherdog
- Last updated on: 3 February 2025

JP Buys (born April 22, 1996) is a South African mixed martial artist, formerly competed in the Bantamweight division of the Ultimate Fighting Championship (UFC).

== Early life ==
Buys won multiple titles for wrestling including the African Wrestling Title, 12th Place at Wrestling World Championship.

== Career ==
=== Extreme Fighting Championship ===
In 2016, Buys rematched Baldwin Mdlalose for the interim EFC Flyweight Title and won by submission.

In 2018, Buys fought for the EFC Bantamweight title versus Philippe Rouch and won by submission.

In 2019, Buys defended the title against Luthando Biko, won by knockout in the fourth round.

=== Contender Series ===
In 2017 Buys fought against Joby Sanchez in Dana White's Contender Series 7 losing by a second round technical knockout.

In 2020 Buys earned a UFC contract when he defeated Jacob Silva by submission on Dana White's Contender Series 36

=== Ultimate Fighting Championship ===
Buys made his UFC debut against Bruno Gustavo da Silva on March 21, 2021, at UFC on ESPN 21. He lost the fight via technical knockout in round two.

In 2021, Buys fought Montel Jackson in UFC Fight Night: Smith vs. Spann losing by a unanimous decision.

In 2022, Buys fought against Cody Durden in UFC on ESPN: Tsarukyan vs. Gamrot and lost by a first-round knockout.

In 2023, Buys fought against Marcus McGhee in UFC on ESPN: Luque vs. dos Anjos losing by a first-round knockout.

=== After UFC Departure ===
Buys claimed the Submission Kings NoGi lightweight title. In 2024, he solidified his grappling dominance by winning gold at the IBJJF NoGi European Championship, earning the title Lightweight Champion of Europe.

== Personal life ==
Buys is the ex-husband of fellow UFC fighter, Cheyanne Vlismas.

Buys opened a gym in 2025 called JPB martial arts academy.

== Titles ==
- Extreme Fighting Championship (EFC)
  - EFC Bantamweight Champion (one defense)
  - Interim EFC Flyweight Champion.

== Mixed martial arts record ==
Professional record breakdown
15 matches	9 wins	6 losses
By knockout	3	4
By submission	5	1
By decision	0	1
By disqualification	1	0

Res.	Record	Opponent	Method	Event	Date	Round	Time	Location	Notes
Loss	9–6	Marcus McGhee	KO (punch)	UFC on ESPN: Luque vs. dos Anjos	August 12, 2023	1	2:19	Las Vegas, Nevada, United States	
Loss	9–5	Cody Durden	TKO (punches)	UFC on ESPN: Tsarukyan vs. Gamrot	June 25, 2022	1	1:08	Las Vegas, Nevada, United States	Flyweight bout.
Loss	9–4	Montel Jackson	Decision (unanimous)	UFC Fight Night: Smith vs. Spann	September 18, 2021	3	5:00	Las Vegas, Nevada, United States	Return to Bantamweight.
Loss	9–3	Bruno Gustavo da Silva	TKO (punch)	UFC on ESPN: Brunson vs. Holland	March 20, 2021	2	2:56	Las Vegas, Nevada, United States	
Win	9–2	Jacob Silva	Technical Submission (guillotine choke)	Dana White's Contender Series 36	November 17, 2020	1	4:54	Las Vegas, Nevada, United States	Return to Flyweight.
Win	8–2	Cristian Rodriguez Jr.	TKO (punches)	LFA 78	November 15, 2019	1	1:13	Belton, Texas, United States	
Win	7–2	Luthando Biko	TKO (punches)	EFC Worldwide 78	April 13, 2019	4	4:00	Cape Town, South Africa	Defended and unified the EFC Bantamweight Championship.
Win	6–2	Gamzat Magomedov	DQ (illegal elbow)	Brave CF 17	October 27, 2018	3	2:43	Lahore, Pakistan	
Win	5–2	Philippe Rouch	Submission (guillotine choke)	EFC Worldwide 69	April 28, 2018	1	2:29	Johannesburg, South Africa	Return to Bantamweight. Won the vacant EFC Bantamweight Championship.
Loss	4–2	Joby Sanchez	TKO (punches)	Dana White's Contender Series 7	August 22, 2017	2	2:28	Las Vegas, Nevada, United States	
Win	4–1	Baldwin Mdlalose	Submission (triangle choke)	EFC Worldwide 54	October 15, 2016	1	2:05	Sun City, South Africa	Return to Flyweight. Won the interim EFC Flyweight Championship.
Win	3–1	Abdul Hassan	TKO (punches)	EFC Worldwide 49	May 13, 2016	2	2:06	Johannesburg, South Africa	Bantamweight debut.
Win	2–1	Roevan De Beer	Submission (rear-naked choke)	EFC Worldwide 47	March 5, 2016	1	3:24	Johannesburg, South Africa	
Loss	1–1	Baldwin Mdlalose	Submission (rear-naked choke)	EFC Worldwide 43	August 28, 2015	1	3:29	Durban, South Africa	
Win	1–0	Josemar Octavio	Submission (rear-naked choke)	EFC Worldwide 41	July 11, 2015	1	1:02	Brakpan, South Africa	Flyweight debut.
