= UFC Fight Night: Assunção vs. Moraes 2 =

UFC mixed martial arts event in 2019

- The poster for UFC Fight Night: Assunção vs. Moraes 2
- Promotion: Ultimate Fighting Championship
- Date: February 2, 2019
- Venue: Centro de Formação Olímpica do Nordeste
- City: Fortaleza, Brazil
- Attendance: 10,040

Event chronology
UFC 233 (cancelled)	UFC Fight Night: Assunção vs. Moraes 2	UFC 234: Adesanya vs. Silva

UFC Fight Night: Assunção vs. Moraes 2 (also known as UFC Fight Night 144 or UFC on ESPN+ 2) was a mixed martial arts event produced by the Ultimate Fighting Championship that was held on February 2, 2019, at Centro de Formação Olímpica do Nordeste in Fortaleza, Brazil.

== Background ==
The event marked the third that the promotion has hosted in the state capital of Ceará, following UFC on Fuel TV: Nogueira vs. Werdum in June 2013, and UFC Fight Night: Belfort vs. Gastelum in March 2017.

A rematch between Raphael Assunção and former WSOF Bantamweight Champion Marlon Moraes served as the event headliner. The pairing previously met in June 2017 at UFC 212 with Assunção winning the fight via split decision.

As a result of the cancellation of UFC 233, a middleweight bout between Markus Perez and promotional newcomer Anthony Hernandez was rescheduled for this event.

A strawweight bout between Marina Rodriguez and Alexa Grasso was scheduled to take place at this event. However, it was reported on December 17 that Rodriguez pulled out of the event due to a hand injury. The pair was rescheduled to UFC on ESPN: Barboza vs. Gaethje.

Dmitry Sosnovskiy was scheduled to face Junior Albini at the event. However Sosnovskiy pulled out of the fight in early January after undergoing surgery to correct a recent injury. Albini instead faced promotional newcomer Jairzinho Rozenstruik.

At the weigh-ins, Sarah Frota and former WSOF Flyweight Champion Magomed Bibulatov both missed the required weight for their respective fights. Frota weighed in at 123 pounds, 7 pounds over the strawweight non-title fight limit of 116. Meanwhile, Bibulatov weighed in at 127 pounds, 1 pound over the flyweight non-title fight limit of 126. Bibulatov was fined 20 percent of his purse, which went to his opponent Rogério Bontorin, while Frota surrendered 40 percent of her purse to former Invicta FC Strawweight Champion Lívia Renata Souza.

== Results ==
Main Card (ESPN+)
Weight class				Method	Round	Time	Notes
Bantamweight	Marlon Moraes	def.	Raphael Assunção	Submission (guillotine choke)	1	3:17
Featherweight	José Aldo	def.	Renato Moicano	TKO (punches)	2	0:44
Welterweight	Demian Maia	def.	Lyman Good	Submission (rear-naked choke)	1	2:38
Lightweight	Charles Oliveira	def.	David Teymur	Submission (anaconda choke)	2	0:55	(Note: Teymur was deducted one point in round one due to an eye poke)
Light Heavyweight	Johnny Walker	def.	Justin Ledet	TKO (spinning back fist and punches)	1	0:15
Catchweight (123 lb)	Lívia Renata Souza	def.	Sarah Frota	Decision (split) (28–29, 29–28, 29–28)	3	5:00
Preliminary Card (ESPN+)
Middleweight	Markus Perez	def.	Anthony Hernandez	Submission (anaconda choke)	2	1:07
Women's Flyweight	Mara Romero Borella	def.	Taila Santos	Decision (split) (29–28, 28–29, 29–28)	3	5:00
Welterweight	Thiago Alves	def.	Max Griffin	Decision (split) (29–28, 28–29, 29–28)	3	5:00
Heavyweight	Jairzinho Rozenstruik	def.	Júnior Albini	TKO (head kick and punches)	2	0:54
Featherweight	Geraldo de Freitas	def.	Felipe Colares	Decision (unanimous) (30–27, 30–27, 30–26)	3	5:00
Bantamweight	Said Nurmagomedov	def.	Ricardo Ramos	TKO (spinning back kick to the body and punches)	1	2:28
Catchweight (127 lb)	Rogério Bontorin	def.	Magomed Bibulatov	Decision (split) (29–28, 28–29, 29–28)	3	5:00

== Bonus awards ==
The following fighters were awarded $50,000 bonuses:

- Fight of the Night: None awarded
- Performances of the Night: Marlon Moraes, José Aldo, Charles Oliveira and Johnny Walker

== See also ==
- List of UFC events
- 2019 in UFC
- List of current UFC fighters
