= UFC on ESPN: Song vs. Simón =

UFC mixed martial arts event in 2023

- The poster for UFC on ESPN: Song vs. Simón
- Promotion: Ultimate Fighting Championship
- Date: April 29, 2023
- Venue: UFC Apex
- City: Enterprise, Nevada, United States
- Attendance: Not announced

Event chronology
UFC Fight Night: Pavlovich vs. Blaydes	UFC on ESPN: Song vs. Simón	UFC 288: Sterling vs. Cejudo

UFC on ESPN: Song vs. Simón (also known as UFC on ESPN 45, and UFC Vegas 72) was a mixed martial arts event produced by the Ultimate Fighting Championship that took place on April 29, 2023, at the UFC Apex facility in Enterprise, Nevada, part of the Las Vegas Metropolitan Area, United States.

== Background ==
A lightweight bout between Arman Tsarukyan and Renato Moicano was expected to headline the event. However, Moicano withdrew due to an injury two weeks before the event and the bout was canceled. As a result, a bantamweight bout between Song Yadong and former LFA Bantamweight Champion Ricky Simón was moved from UFC Fight Night: Pavlovich vs. Blaydes to instead headline this event.

A middleweight bout between Cody Brundage and Rodolfo Vieira took place at the event. They were previously scheduled to meet at UFC Fight Night: Nzechukwu vs. Cuțelaba but Vieira pulled out from the event due to undisclosed reasons.

A heavyweight bout between Jake Collier and Martin Buday was originally expected to take place two weeks prior at UFC Fight Night: Holloway vs. Allen but was moved to this event for unknown reasons.

During fight week, three bouts booked for this event suffered changes: a women's strawweight bout between former Invicta FC Strawweight Champion Emily Ducote and Polyana Viana was rescheduled for UFC Fight Night: Pennington vs. Aldana 2 on May 20; Ange Loosa pulled out of his welterweight bout against Joshua Quinlan for undisclosed reasons and was replaced by current LFA Welterweight Champion Trey Waters; and a lightweight bout between Natan Levy and Pete Rodriguez was rescheduled for UFC on ABC: Rozenstruik vs. Almeida on May 13 due to an undisclosed issue on Rodriguez's side.

A day later, another fight changed as Brian Kelleher pulled out of his bantamweight bout against Journey Newson. He was replaced by Marcus McGhee in a catchweight bout of 140 pounds.

At the weigh-ins, promotional newcomers Irina Alekseeva and Hailey Cowan missed weight. Alekseeva weighed in at 140 pounds and Cowan weighed in at 137.5 pounds, four pounds and one and a half pounds over the women's bantamweight non-title fight limit respectively. Both bouts proceeded at catchweight with Alekseeva being fined 30 percent and Cowan 20 percent of their purses, which went to their opponents Stephanie Egger and Jamey-Lyn Horth respectively.

== Results ==
Main Card (ESPN2 / ESPN+)
Weight class				Method	Round	Time	Notes
Bantamweight	Song Yadong	def.	Ricky Simón	TKO (punches)	5	1:10
Middleweight	Caio Borralho	def.	Michał Oleksiejczuk	Submission (rear-naked choke)	2	2:49
Middleweight	Rodolfo Vieira	def.	Cody Brundage	Submission (arm-triangle choke)	2	1:28
Featherweight	Fernando Padilla	def.	Julian Erosa	TKO (punches)	1	1:41
Heavyweight	Marcos Rogério de Lima	def.	Waldo Cortes-Acosta	Decision (unanimous) (29–28, 29–28, 29–28)	3	5:00
Welterweight	Trey Waters	def.	Josh Quinlan	Decision (unanimous) (30–27, 30–27, 30–27)	3	5:00
Preliminary Card (ESPN2 / ESPN+)
Heavyweight	Martin Buday	def.	Jake Collier	Decision (unanimous) (29–28, 29–28, 29–28)	3	5:00
Flyweight	Cody Durden	def.	Charles Johnson	Decision (unanimous) (30–27, 30–27, 30–27)	3	5:00
Catchweight (140 lb)	Irina Alekseeva	def.	Stephanie Egger	Submission (kneebar)	1	2:11
Catchweight (140 lb)	Marcus McGhee	def.	Journey Newson	Submission (rear-naked choke)	2	2:03
Catchweight (137.5 lb)	Jamey-Lyn Horth	def.	Hailey Cowan	Decision (unanimous) (29–28, 29–28, 29–28)	3	5:00

== Bonus awards ==
The following fighters received $50,000 bonuses.

- Fight of the Night: No bonus awarded.
- Performance of the Night: Song Yadong, Caio Borralho, Rodolfo Vieira, and Marcus McGhee

== See also ==
- List of UFC events
- List of current UFC fighters
- 2023 in UFC
