= UFC on ESPN: Holloway vs. Allen =

Mixed martial arts event in 2023

- The poster for UFC on ESPN: Holloway vs. Allen
- Promotion: Ultimate Fighting Championship
- Date: April 15, 2023
- Venue: T-Mobile Center
- City: Kansas City, Missouri, United States
- Attendance: 16,234
- Total gate: $2,180,096

Event chronology
UFC 287: Pereira vs. Adesanya 2	UFC on ESPN: Holloway vs. Allen	UFC Fight Night: Pavlovich vs. Blaydes

UFC on ESPN: Holloway vs. Allen (also known as UFC on ESPN 44) was a mixed martial arts event produced by the Ultimate Fighting Championship that took place on April 15, 2023, at the T-Mobile Center in Kansas City, Missouri, United States.

== Background ==
The event marked the promotion's second visit to Kansas City and first since UFC on Fox: Johnson vs. Reis in April 2017.

A featherweight bout between former UFC Featherweight Champion Max Holloway and Arnold Allen headlined the event.

A bantamweight bout between Danaa Batgerel and Brady Hiestand was scheduled for the event. However, the pair was moved to UFC Fight Night: Pavlovich vs. Blaydes a week later for undisclosed reasons.

A heavyweight bout between Jake Collier and Martin Buday was expected to take place at this event. However, the bout was moved to UFC Fight Night: Tsarukyan vs. Moicano for unknown reasons.

At the weigh-ins, Joselyne Edwards weighed in at 136.5 pounds, half a pound over the women's bantamweight non-title fight limit. Her bout proceeded at catchweight and she was fined an undisclosed percentage of her purse which went to her opponent Lucie Pudilová.

== Results ==
Main Card (ESPN / ESPN+)
Weight class				Method	Round	Time	Notes
Featherweight	Max Holloway	def.	Arnold Allen	Decision (unanimous) (49–46, 49–46, 48–47)	5	5:00
Featherweight	Edson Barboza	def.	Billy Quarantillo	KO (knee)	1	2:37
Light Heavyweight	Azamat Murzakanov	def.	Dustin Jacoby	Decision (unanimous) (29–28, 29–28, 29–28)	3	5:00
Light Heavyweight	Ion Cuțelaba	def.	Tanner Boser	TKO (punches)	1	2:05
Bantamweight	Pedro Munhoz	def.	Chris Gutiérrez	Decision (unanimous) (30–27, 30–27, 30–27)	3	5:00
Lightweight	Rafa García	def.	Clay Guida	Decision (unanimous) (30–27, 30–27, 30–27)	3	5:00
Preliminary card (ESPN+)
Featherweight	Bill Algeo	def.	T.J. Brown	Submission (rear-naked choke)	2	1:40
Flyweight	Brandon Royval	def.	Matheus Nicolau	KO (knee and elbows)	1	2:09
Light Heavyweight	Zak Cummings	def.	Ed Herman	TKO (punches)	3	4:13	(Note: Herman was deducted 1 point in round 2 due to an illegal upkick.)
Women's Strawweight	Gillian Robertson	def.	Piera Rodríguez	Submission (armbar)	2	4:21
Lightweight	Daniel Zellhuber	def.	Lando Vannata	Decision (unanimous) (29–27, 29–28, 30–27)	3	5:00
Women's Strawweight	Denise Gomes	def.	Bruna Brasil	TKO (punches)	2	2:42
Bantamweight	Gastón Bolaños	def.	Aaron Phillips	Decision (unanimous) (29–28, 30–27, 30–27)	3	5:00
Catchweight (136.5 lb)	Joselyne Edwards	def.	Lucie Pudilová	Decision (split) (29–28, 28–29, 29–28)	3	5:00

== Bonus awards ==
The following fighters received $50,000 bonuses.

- Fight of the Night: Bill Algeo vs. T.J. Brown
- Performance of the Night: Edson Barboza, Brandon Royval, and Gillian Robertson

== See also ==
- List of UFC events
- List of current UFC fighters
- 2023 in UFC
