= Danaa Batgerel =

Mongolian mixed martial arts fighter

- Born: Данаа Батгэрэл; July 4, 1989 (age 37); Erdenetsagaan, Mongolia
- Other names: Storm
- Height: 5 ft 6.5 in (1.69 m)
- Weight: 135 lb (61 kg; 9 st 9 lb)
- Division: Bantamweight
- Reach: 70 in (178 cm)
- Fighting out of: Albuquerque, New Mexico
- Team: Team Tungaa; Jackson Wink MMA
- Years active: 2011–present

Mixed martial arts record
- Total: 17
- Wins: 12
- By knockout: 8
- By submission: 2
- By decision: 2
- Losses: 5
- By knockout: 2
- By decision: 3

Other information
- Mixed martial arts record from Sherdog

Danaa Batgerel (born July 4, 1989) is a Mongolian mixed martial artist who competes in the Bantamweight division. A professional since 2011, he is most notable for his time in the Ultimate Fighting Championship.

== Background ==
Growing up in a rural region of Mongolia, Batgerel began training kickboxing in 2007, before picking up mixed martial arts in 2010.

== Mixed martial arts career ==
=== Early career ===
Batgerel has been competing professionally since 2011, compiling a 7–1 record before the UFC. Before joining the UFC, he competed in Legend Fighting Championship, Ranik Ultimate Fighting Federation, Baikal Fighting Championship and Mongol Fighting Championship, among others. His most notable bout during this time was a win over fellow future UFC fighter, Kai Kara-France.

=== Ultimate Fighting Championship ===
Batgerel made his debut on August 31, 2019 at UFC Fight Night: Andrade vs. Zhang against Alateng Heili. He lost the fight via unanimous decision. This fight earned him the Fight of the Night award.

Batgerel faced Guido Cannetti on March 7, 2020 at UFC 248. He won the fight via knockout in the first round.

Batgerel was expected to face Kyler Phillips at UFC on ESPN: Holm vs. Aldana on October 4, 2020. However, Batgerel pulled out due to travel restrictions related to the COVID-19 pandemic in Mongolia. He was replaced by promotional newcomer Cameron Else.

Batgerel faced Kevin Natividad at UFC 261 on April 24, 2021. He won the fight via technical knockout in round one.

Batgerel was scheduled to face Montel Jackson on September 18, 2021, at UFC Fight Night 192. However, Batgerel was pulled from the event due to visa issues and he was replaced by JP Buys.

Batgerel faced Brandon Davis on October 16, 2021, at UFC Fight Night 195. He won the fight via technical knockout in round one. This win earned him the Performance of the Night award.

Batgerel was scheduled to face Montel Jackson on March 26, 2022 at UFC on ESPN 33. However, Jackson had to pull out of the bout and was replaced by Chris Gutiérrez. Batgerel lost the fight via spinning backfist TKO in the second round.

Batgerel, replacing Saimon Oliveira, faced Kang Kyung-Ho on June 11, 2022, at UFC 275. He lost the bout via unanimous decision.

Batgerel was expected to face Brady Hiestand on April 15, 2023 at UFC on ESPN 44. However, the pair was moved to UFC Fight Night 222 on April 22, 2023 for undisclosed reasons. Batgerel lost the fight via technical knockout in the third round.

On June 5, 2023, news surfaced that Batgerel had fought out his contract and the organization opted not to renew it.

== Championships and accomplishments ==
=== Mixed martial arts ===
- Ultimate Fighting Championship
  - Fight of the Night (One time) vs. Alateng Heili
  - Performance of the Night (One time) vs. Brandon Davis
- MGL-1 Fighting Championship
  - MGL Featherweight Championship

== Mixed martial arts record ==
Professional record breakdown
17 matches	12 wins	5 losses
By knockout	8	2
By submission	2	0
By decision	2	3

Res.	Record	Opponent	Method	Event	Date	Round	Time	Location	Notes
Loss	12–5	Brady Hiestand	TKO (punches)	UFC Fight Night: Pavlovich vs. Blaydes	April 22, 2023	3	4:21	Las Vegas, Nevada, United States	
Loss	12–4	Kang Kyung-ho	Decision (unanimous)	UFC 275	June 11, 2022	3	5:00	Kallang, Singapore	
Loss	12–3	Chris Gutiérrez	TKO (spinning backfist and elbows)	UFC on ESPN: Blaydes vs. Daukaus	March 26, 2022	2	2:34	Columbus, Ohio, United States	
Win	12–2	Brandon Davis	TKO (elbows and punches)	UFC Fight Night: Ladd vs. Dumont	October 16, 2021	1	2:01	Las Vegas, Nevada, United States	Performance of the Night.
Win	11–2	Kevin Natividad	TKO (punches)	UFC 261	April 24, 2021	1	0:50	Jacksonville, Florida, United States	
Win	10–2	Guido Cannetti	KO (punches)	UFC 248	March 7, 2020	1	3:01	Las Vegas, Nevada, United States	
Loss	9–2	Alateng Heili	Decision (unanimous)	UFC Fight Night: Andrade vs. Zhang	August 31, 2019	3	5:00	Shenzhen, China	Fight of the Night.
Win	9–1	Haitao Ti	Submission (rear-naked choke)	Mongol FC 2	June 22, 2019	1	3:05	Ulaanbaatar, Mongolia	Return to Bantamweight.
Win	8–1	Sukhbold Sodnomdorj	KO (knee to the body)	MGL-1 FC 11	June 30, 2018	1	1:40	Erdenet, Mongolia	Featherweight debut. Won the vacant MGL Featherweight Championship.
Win	7–1	Aldar Budanaev	TKO (elbows and punches)	Baikal FC 5	May 12, 2018	2	1:18	Ulan-Ude, Russia	Lightweight debut.
Win	6–1	Jiahao Hao	TKO (punches)	Chin Woo Men: 2017-2018 Season: Stage 3	January 20, 2018	1	4:14	Hefei, China	
Win	5–1	Tianlong Luo	TKO (punches)	Chin Woo Men: 2017-2018 Season, Stage 2	December 10, 2017	2	4:47	Wuhan, China	
Loss	4–1	Baasankhuu Damnlanpurev	Decision (unanimous)	MGL-1 FC 7	November 28, 2015	3	5:00	Ulaanbaatar, Mongolia	Return to Bantamweight.
Win	4–0	Rijirigala Amu	Submission (rear-naked choke)	Ranik Ultimate Fighting Federation 12	March 29, 2014	2	N/A	Shanghai, China	Flyweight debut.
Win	3–0	Kai Kara-France	Decision (unanimous)	Legend FC 11	April 27, 2013	3	5:00	Kuala Lumpur, Malaysia	
Win	2–0	Jazor Ablasi	Decision (majority)	Legend FC 8	March 30, 2012	3	5:00	Hong Kong, SAR, China	
Win	1–0	Vincent Siu	TKO (punches)	Legend FC 6	October 30, 2011	1	3:39	Cotai, Macau	Bantamweight debut.

== Karate Combat record ==
Professional record breakdown
2 matches	2 wins	0 losses
By knockout	2	0
By submission	0	0
By decision	0	0

Res.	Record	Opponent	Method	Event	Date	Round	Time	Location	Notes
Win	2–0	Freddy Gonzalez	TKO (punches)	Karate Combat: Kickback 3	November 14, 2024	2	1:20	Bangkok, Thailand	
Win	1–0	Freddy Masabo	TKO (flying knee)	Karate Combat 43	December 15, 2023	3	0:28	Las Vegas, Nevada, United States	

== See also ==
- List of male mixed martial artists
