= Marcus McGhee =

American mixed martial artist

- Born: Marcus Julius McGhee; May 7, 1990 (age 36); Detroit, Michigan, U.S.
- Other names: The Maniac
- Height: 5 ft 8 in (173 cm)
- Weight: 135 lb (61 kg; 9 st 9 lb)
- Division: Bantamweight (2020–present); Featherweight (2021, 2026)
- Reach: 69 in (175 cm)
- Stance: Orthodox
- Fighting out of: Phoenix, Arizona, U.S.
- Team: MMA Lab
- Years active: 2020–present

Mixed martial arts record
- Total: 14
- Wins: 12
- By knockout: 9
- By submission: 1
- By decision: 2
- Losses: 2
- By submission: 1
- By decision: 1

Amateur record
- Total: 5
- Wins: 3
- By knockout: 2
- By submission: 1
- Losses: 2
- By submission: 1

Other information
- University: Glendale Community College
- Mixed martial arts record from Sherdog

Marcus Julius McGhee (born May 7, 1990) is an American professional mixed martial artist, currently competing in the Bantamweight division of the Ultimate Fighting Championship (UFC). As of October 17, 2026, he is #9 in the Meta UFC bantamweight rankings.

== Early life ==
McGhee was born in Detroit, Michigan, and was raised by his single mother, as his father spent most of his life in prison.

== Mixed martial arts career ==
=== Early career ===
As an amateur, McGhee had a 3–2 record, winning his final three fights consecutively and capturing the Iron Boy MMA Featherweight Championship. He turned pro in 2020, compiling a 6–1 record in his first seven professional fights.

=== Ultimate Fighting Championship ===
In his promotional debut, as a late replacement for Brian Kelleher, who was forced to withdraw, McGhee faced Journey Newson in a 140 pounds catchweight bout on April 29, 2023, at UFC on ESPN 45. McGhee won the fight via a rear-naked choke in the second round. This win earning him the Performance of the Night award.

McGhee was scheduled to face Gastón Bolaños on August 12, 2023, at UFC on ESPN 51. However, Bolaños withdrew due to undisclosed reasons and was replaced by JP Buys. He won the fight via knockout in the first round. This win earned him his second consecutive Performance of the Night award.

The bout between McGhee and Bolaños was rescheduled for January 13, 2024, at UFC Fight Night 234. He won the fight via technical knockout in the second round. This win earning his third straight Performance of the Night award.

McGhee faced Jonathan Martinez on November 26, 2024, at UFC 309. He won the fight via unanimous decision, the first decision victory of his career.

McGhee faced former UFC Bantamweight Champion Petr Yan on July 26, 2025, at UFC on ABC 9. He lost the fight by unanimous decision.

McGhee was scheduled to face Jakub Wikłacz on June 6, 2026 at UFC Fight Night 278. However, Wikłacz pulled out in early May due to injury and was replaced by John Yannis. McGhee won the fight by unanimous decision.

McGhee was scheduled to face Bernardo Sopaj on October 3, 2026 at UFC 332. However, Sopaj pulled out due to injury just three days before the event and was replaced by promotional newcomer Anthony Romero in a featherweight bout. McGhee won the fight by technical knockout at the end of the first round.

== Personal life ==
McGhee currently resides in Phoenix, Arizona. He is married with four kids.

== Championships and accomplishments ==
=== Mixed martial arts ===
- Ultimate Fighting Championship
  - Performance of the Night (Three times) vs. Journey Newson, JP Buys and Gastón Bolaños
- Iron Boy MMA
  - Iron Boy MMA Featherweight Championship (One time)
- MMA Fighting
  - 2023 Third Team MMA All-Star
- Phoenix New Times – Best of Phoenix 2024: Boomtown
  - 2024 Best Cannabis Athlete

== Mixed martial arts record ==
Professional record breakdown
14 matches	12 wins	2 losses
By knockout	9	0
By submission	1	1
By decision	2	1

Res.	Record	Opponent	Method	Event	Date	Round	Time	Location	Notes
Win	12–2	Anthony Romero	TKO (punches)	UFC 332	October 3, 2026	1	4:57	Salt Lake City, Utah, United States	Featherweight bout.
Win	11–2	John Yannis	Decision (unanimous)	UFC Fight Night: Muhammad vs. Bonfim	June 6, 2026	3	5:00	Las Vegas, Nevada, United States	
Loss	10–2	Petr Yan	Decision (unanimous)	UFC on ABC: Whittaker vs. de Ridder	July 26, 2025	3	5:00	Abu Dhabi, United Arab Emirates	
Win	10–1	Jonathan Martinez	Decision (unanimous)	UFC 309	November 16, 2024	3	5:00	New York City, New York, United States	
Win	9–1	Gastón Bolaños	TKO (spinning wheel kick and punches)	UFC Fight Night: Ankalaev vs. Walker 2	January 13, 2024	3	3:29	Las Vegas, Nevada, United States	Performance of the Night.
Win	8–1	JP Buys	KO (punch)	UFC on ESPN: Luque vs. dos Anjos	August 12, 2023	1	2:19	Las Vegas, Nevada, United States	Performance of the Night.
Win	7–1	Journey Newson	Submission (rear-naked choke)	UFC on ESPN: Song vs. Simón	April 29, 2023	2	2:03	Las Vegas, Nevada, United States	Catchweight (140 lb) bout. Performance of the Night.
Win	6–1	Luciano Ramos	TKO (punches)	LFA 149	January 6, 2023	3	1:39	Chandler, Arizona, United States	
Win	5–1	Abe Sellers	TKO (punches)	Goat Promotions: Cowboys vs. Cajuns 3	November 10, 2022	3	0:24	Dallas, Texas, United States	Catchweight (140 lb) bout.
Loss	4–1	Rafael do Nascimento	Submission (rear-naked choke)	LFA 135	July 8, 2022	1	3:12	Phoenix, Arizona, United States	
Win	4–0	Rodney Mondala	KO (punch)	RUF 47	May 14, 2022	1	0:58	Phoenix, Arizona, United States	
Win	3–0	Raphael Montini de Lima	KO (punches)	RUF 42	July 31, 2021	2	1:57	Phoenix, Arizona, United States	Return to Bantamweight.
Win	2–0	Ricky Maynez	TKO (punches)	RUF 40	April 25, 2021	2	3:51	Glendale, Arizona, United States	Featherweight debut.
Win	1–0	Nick Alwag	KO (punch)	RUF 38	February 15, 2020	1	1:13	Glendale, Arizona, United States	Bantamweight debut.

=== Amateur record ===
Amateur record breakdown		
5 matches	3 wins	2 losses
By knockout	2	0
By submission	1	1
By decision	0	1

Res.	Record	Opponent	Method	Event	Date	Round	Time	Location	Notes
Win	3–2	Stephen Esparza-Owens	KO (punch)	Iron Boy MMA 13	November 17, 2018	1	2:16	Phoenix, Arizona, U.S.	Won the Iron Boy MMA Featherweight Championship.
Win	2–2	Shawn Garrett	Submission (guillotine choke)	World Fighting Federation 40	October 27, 2018	3	0:35	Chandler, Arizona, U.S.	
Win	1–2	Moe Ismail	TKO (punches)	Duel for Domination 13	September 12, 2015	1	0:39	Mesa, Arizona, U.S.	
Loss	0–2	Derrick Brown	Decision (unanimous)	KOTC: Alliance	May 26, 2014	3	3:00	Scottsdale, Arizona, U.S.	Featherweight debut.
Loss	0–1	Joshua Medina	Submission (armbar)	Rage in the Cage 163	October 20, 2012	1	2:55	Chandler, Arizona, U.S.	Lightweight debut.

== See also ==
- List of current UFC fighters
- List of male mixed martial artists
