= UFC Fight Night: Brunson vs. Shahbazyan =

2020 mixed martial arts event

- The poster for UFC Fight Night: Brunson vs. Shahbazyan
- Promotion: Ultimate Fighting Championship
- Date: August 1, 2020
- Venue: UFC Apex
- City: Enterprise, Nevada, United States
- Attendance: None (behind closed doors)

Event chronology
UFC on ESPN: Whittaker vs. Till	UFC Fight Night: Brunson vs. Shahbazyan	UFC Fight Night: Lewis vs. Oleinik

UFC Fight Night: Brunson vs. Shahbazyan (also known as UFC Fight Night 173, UFC on ESPN+ 31 and UFC Vegas 5) was a mixed martial arts event produced by the Ultimate Fighting Championship that took place on August 1, 2020 at the UFC Apex facility in Enterprise, Nevada, part of the Las Vegas Metropolitan Area, United States.

== Background ==
A women's bantamweight bout between former UFC Women's Bantamweight Champion Holly Holm and Irene Aldana was originally slated to serve as the event headliner. However, it was reported on July 22 that Aldana had tested positive for COVID-19 and pulled out of the fight. As a result, Holm was removed from the card as well and the pairing was ultimately rescheduled for October, in the main event of UFC on ESPN: Holm vs. Aldana. Subsequently, a middleweight bout between Derek Brunson and Edmen Shahbazyan was then promoted to serve as a three-round main event. This fight was originally expected to take place in March at UFC 248, but eventually moved to UFC Fight Night: Overeem vs. Harris one month later. However, that event was cancelled due to the COVID-19 pandemic. The pairing was rescheduled for this event.

A women's flyweight bout between former Invicta FC Flyweight Champion Jennifer Maia and Viviane Araújo was initially scheduled for June 27, at UFC on ESPN: Poirier vs. Hooker. However, the bout was rescheduled in mid-June and moved to this event after both participants faced travel restrictions related to the COVID-19 pandemic. Subsequently, Araújo was removed from the card on July 20 after testing positive for COVID-19 and replaced by Joanne Calderwood.

A welterweight bout between Vicente Luque and Randy Brown was initially scheduled for April 11, at UFC Fight Night: Overeem vs. Harris. However, that event was cancelled in mid-March due to the COVID-19 pandemic. The pairing was rescheduled for this event.

A women's bantamweight bout between Ketlen Vieira and former Invicta FC Bantamweight Champion and UFC Women's Featherweight Championship challenger Yana Kunitskaya was initially scheduled for this event, but eventually moved to UFC Fight Night: Lewis vs. Oleinik a week later.

South Korean fighters Park Jun-yong and Jung Da Un were respectively expected to face Trevin Giles and Ed Herman at the event. However, Park and Jun were both removed from the bouts on July 23 due to alleged travel restrictions related to the COVID-19 pandemic. In turn, Giles would face Kevin Holland, while Herman would face Gerald Meerschaert. On the day of the event, Meerschaert was pulled due to testing positive for COVID-19 and his bout against Herman was cancelled. During the event, Giles fainted just moments before his walkout and therefore his bout against Holland was also cancelled. It was later reported that Dana White personally called Herman to see if he could fight Holland, but Herman was already somewhere outside of the quarantine bubble and prohibited from re-entering.

Luke Sanders was expected to face Chris Gutiérrez at the event. However, Sanders was removed from the bout in mid-July for undisclosed reasons and replaced by promotional newcomer Cody Durden.

Timur Valiev was expected to make his promotional debut against Jamall Emmers. However, Valiev was removed from the card two days before the event for undisclosed reasons and replaced by Vincent Cachero.

Former UFC Flyweight Championship challenger Ray Borg was expected to face Nate Maness in a bantamweight bout at the event. However, Borg was removed from the fight on the day of the event's weigh-in for undisclosed reasons. Maness faced Johnny Muñoz Jr. in a featherweight bout.

Eric Spicely was expected to face Markus Perez at the event. However, Spicely was removed from the fight (and subsequently released from the promotion) on the day of the event's weigh-in for health issues related to his weight cut. He was replaced by Charles Ontiveros, in what would be a catchweight bout of 195 pounds. In turn, Ontiveros was deemed ineligible to compete and did not weigh in, thus cancelling the fight.

At the weigh-ins, Jonathan Martinez weighed in at 140.5 pounds, four and a half pounds over the bantamweight non-title fight limit. His bout proceeded at a catchweight and he was fined 30% of his purse, which went to his opponent Frankie Saenz.

Due to the many unexpected changes and last minute cancellations, the event took place with only eight bouts on the card, making it the smallest UFC event since UFC 177 in August 2014.

== Results ==
Main card (ESPN+)
Weight class				Method	Round	Time	Notes
Middleweight	Derek Brunson	def.	Edmen Shahbazyan	TKO (punches)	3	0:26
Women's Flyweight	Jennifer Maia	def.	Joanne Calderwood	Submission (armbar)	1	4:29
Welterweight	Vicente Luque	def.	Randy Brown	KO (knee and punches)	2	4:56
Lightweight	Bobby Green	def.	Lando Vannata	Decision (unanimous) (30–26, 30–27, 30–27)	3	5:00
Preliminary card (ESPN+)
Catchweight (140.5 lb)	Jonathan Martinez	def.	Frankie Saenz	TKO (knee and punches)	3	0:57
Featherweight	Nate Maness	def.	Johnny Muñoz Jr.	Decision (unanimous) (29–27, 29–27, 29–27)	3	5:00	(Note: Muñoz was deducted a point in round 3 due to repeated groin strikes.)
Featherweight	Jamall Emmers	def.	Vincent Cachero	Decision (unanimous) (30–27, 30–27, 30–27)	3	5:00
Bantamweight	Chris Gutiérrez	vs.	Cody Durden	Draw (unanimous) (28–28, 28–28, 28–28)	3	5:00	(Note: First ever unanimous draw in UFC history without point deductions)

== Bonus awards ==
The following fighters received $50,000 bonuses.

- Fight of the Night: Bobby Green vs. Lando Vannata
- Performance of the Night: Jennifer Maia and Vicente Luque

== See also ==
- List of UFC events
- List of current UFC fighters
- 2020 in UFC
