= UFC Fight Night: Sterling vs. Zalal =

Mixed martial arts event in 2026

- The poster for UFC Fight Night: Sterling vs. Zalal
- Promotion: Ultimate Fighting Championship
- Date: April 25, 2026
- Venue: Meta Apex
- City: Enterprise, Nevada, United States
- Attendance: Not announced

Event chronology
UFC Fight Night: Burns vs. Malott	UFC Fight Night: Sterling vs. Zalal	UFC Fight Night: Della Maddalena vs. Prates

UFC Fight Night: Sterling vs. Zalal (also known as UFC Fight Night 274 and UFC Vegas 116) was a mixed martial arts event produced by the Ultimate Fighting Championship that took place on April 25, 2026, at the Meta Apex in Enterprise, Nevada, part of the Las Vegas Valley, United States.

== Background ==
A welterweight bout between Sean Brady and Joaquin Buckley was originally scheduled to serve as the main event, but the pairing was re-scheduled to UFC 328 two weeks later. The promotion then booked a featherweight bout between former UFC Bantamweight Champion Aljamain Sterling and Youssef Zalal as the event's new headliner.

A women's bantamweight bout between former Invicta FC Bantamweight Champion and UFC Women's Featherweight Championship challenger Yana Santos and Norma Dumont was scheduled to take place at the event. Santos and Dumont had previously been scheduled to meet in January 2024 at UFC Fight Night: Ankalaev vs. Walker 2, but the bout was scrapped after Santos withdrew due to a broken nose. In turn, Santos withdrew again (this time due to undisclosed reasons) and was replaced by Joselyne Edwards.

A heavyweight bout between Max Gimenis and Allen Frye was scheduled for the event. However, Frye withdrew for undisclosed reasons and was replaced by Marcus Buchecha. In turn, Gimenis withdrew from the bout for undisclosed reasons and was replaced by former LFA Light Heavyweight Champion Ryan Spann.

A flyweight bout between Lucas Rocha and Jafel Filho was scheduled for the event. However, Rocha withdrew for undisclosed reasons and was replaced by Cody Durden on six days' notice in a bantamweight bout.

== Results ==
Main card (Paramount+)
Weight class				Method	Round	Time	Notes
Featherweight	Aljamain Sterling	def.	Youssef Zalal	Decision (unanimous) (49–45, 49–45, 49–45)	5	5:00
Women's Bantamweight	Joselyne Edwards	def.	Norma Dumont	Decision (unanimous) (29–28, 29–28, 30–27)	3	5:00
Lightweight	Rafa García	def.	Alexander Hernandez	Decision (unanimous) (29–28, 29–28, 30–27)	3	5:00
Bantamweight	Davey Grant	def.	Adrián Luna Martinetti	Decision (unanimous) (29–28, 29–28, 29–28)	3	5:00
Bantamweight	Raoni Barcelos	def.	Montel Jackson	Decision (split) (29–28, 28–29, 29–28)	3	5:00
Heavyweight	Ryan Spann	def.	Marcus Buchecha	KO (punches)	2	2:10
Preliminary card (Paramount+)
Middleweight	Eric McConico	def.	Rodolfo Vieira	Decision (unanimous) (29–28, 29–28, 29–28)	3	5:00
Middleweight	Jackson McVey	def.	Sedriques Dumas	Submission (brabo choke)	1	2:14
Women's Bantamweight	Michelle Montague	def.	Mayra Bueno Silva	Decision (unanimous) (30–27, 29–28, 29–28)	3	5:00
Bantamweight	Cody Durden	def.	Jafel Filho	Decision (unanimous) (30–27, 30–27, 29–28)	3	5:00
Lightweight	Francis Marshall	def.	Lucas Brennan	Decision (unanimous) (30–27, 30–27, 30–27)	3	5:00
Welterweight	Victor Valenzuela	def.	Max Griffin	Decision (unanimous) (29–28, 29–28, 29–28)	3	5:00
Women's Strawweight	Talita Alencar	def.	Julia Polastri	Decision (unanimous) (29–28, 29–28, 29–28)	3	5:00

== Bonus awards ==
The following fighters received $100,000 bonuses.

- Fight of the Night: Davey Grant vs. Adrián Luna Martinetti
- Performance of the Night: Ryan Spann and Jackson McVey

== Aftermath ==
This event ties UFC 263 for the most decision bouts in a single UFC event with 11.

== See also ==
- 2026 in UFC
- List of current UFC fighters
- List of UFC events
