= Cody Durden =

American mixed martial artist

- Born: Cody Marcus Brian Durden; March 29, 1991 (age 35); Covington, Georgia, U.S.
- Other names: Custom Made
- Height: 5 ft 7 in (1.70 m)
- Weight: 125 lb (57 kg; 8 st 13 lb)
- Division: Flyweight (2017–2018, 2020–present); Bantamweight (2016–2020, 2024)
- Reach: 67 in (170 cm)
- Stance: Southpaw
- Fighting out of: Covington, Georgia, U.S.
- Team: American Top Team Atlanta (2014–2020); American Top Team Gwinnett (2020–present)
- Rank: Brown belt in Brazilian Jiu-Jitsu
- Years active: 2016–present

Professional boxing record
- Total: 4
- Wins: 4

Mixed martial arts record
- Total: 31
- Wins: 19
- By knockout: 6
- By submission: 6
- By decision: 7
- Losses: 11
- By knockout: 2
- By submission: 6
- By decision: 3
- Draws: 1

Other information
- Boxing record from BoxRec
- Mixed martial arts record from Sherdog

Cody Marcus Brian Durden (born March 29, 1991) is an American mixed martial artist who competes in the Flyweight division of the Ultimate Fighting Championship.

== Background ==
Playing multiple sports since early childhood, Durden was an aspiring baseball player but around the eighth grade he switched completely to wrestling due to stopped growth. A 2009 graduate of Eastside High School, he wrestled under coach Michael Smith-Foot, leading the Eagles to two state championships. He compiled a remarkable 121–31 record, winning four area championships, two sectional titles and advanced to the state final as a senior.

After the arrival of his son, he started working instead of attending school. After the invitation of his long-time friend and mixed martial artist Travis Knight to train at a gym, he started training regularly around the age of 21 and made his amateur debut in 2014.

== Mixed martial arts career ==
=== Early career ===
Durden's first bout in 2014 brought him a loss against Francisco Quijada in the amateur National Fighting Championship promotion. Following that loss, Durden went on a five-fight win streak with the NFC, prompting the fighter to move up to a more professional level.

Durden won his first four professional fights, then suffered back-to-back defeats to Jared Scoggins and Ryan Hollis. He would go on to win the next 7 bouts, all via stoppage, winning the VF Bantamweight Championship in the process.

=== Ultimate Fighting Championship ===
Durden, as a replacement for Luke Sanders, faced Chris Gutiérrez on August 1, 2020, at UFC Fight Night 173. The fight ended in draw.

Dropping down to flyweight, Durden was scheduled to face Jimmy Flick on December 5, 2020 at UFC on ESPN 19. However, Durden was prevented from competing after being diagnosed with conjunctivitis, and the bout was postponed to take place on December 19, 2020, at UFC Fight Night 183. He lost the bout via flying triangle choke in the first round.

Durden faced Aori Qileng on November 20, 2021, at UFC Fight Night 198. He won the bout via unanimous decision

Durden faced Muhammad Mokaev on March 19, 2022, at UFC Fight Night 204. He lost the fight via guillotine choke in round one.

Durden faced JP Buys on June 25, 2022, at UFC on ESPN 38. He won the fight via technical knockout in the first round.

Durden was expected to face Kleydson Rodrigues on October 29, 2022, at UFC Fight Night 213. However, Rodrigues withdrew from the bout and was replaced by Legacy Fighting Alliance flyweight champion Carlos Mota on four day's notice. Durden won the bout via unanimous decision.

Durden faced Charles Johnson on April 29, 2023, at UFC on ESPN 45. He won the fight via unanimous decision.

Durden was scheduled to face Bruno Gustavo da Silva on September 23, 2023, at UFC Fight Night 228. However, the bout was canceled as Durden instead faced Jake Hadley at UFC on ESPN: Sandhagen vs. Font on August 5, 2023 as a result of Hadley's original opponent, Tagir Ulanbekov, being unable to compete. Durden defeated Hadley by unanimous decision.

Durden faced Tagir Ulanbekov on December 16, 2023, at UFC 296. He lost the fight via a face crank submission in the second round.

Durden was scheduled to face Carlos Hernandez on June 29, 2024, at UFC 303. However, Durden was pulled from the event for unknown reasons and was replaced by Rei Tsuruya. Later in an interview, Durden said in an interview that the reason for withdrawal was an issue with a banned substance from a possibly contaminated supplement, from which he was subsequently exonerated.

Durden ended up facing Bruno Gustavo da Silva and on July 20, 2024, at UFC on ESPN 60. He lost the fight by technical knockout in the second round.

On under a week's notice and replacing an injured Alessandro Costa, Durden faced Matt Schnell in a bantamweight bout on September 7, 2024 at UFC Fight Night 242. He won the fight via an anaconda choke submission in the second round. This fight earned him his first Performance of the Night award.

Durden faced Joshua Van on December 7, 2024 at UFC 310. He lost the fight by unanimous decision.

Durden faced Jose Ochoa on June 14, 2025 at UFC on ESPN 69. He lost the fight by knockout in the second round.

Replacing Rafael Estevam who withdrew for undisclosed reasons, Durden faced Allan Nascimento in a 130 lb catchweight bout on November 1, 2025 at UFC Fight Night 263. He lost the fight via an anaconda choke submission in the second round.

Durden faced Nyamjargal Tumendemberel on March 7, 2026, at UFC 326. He lost the fight by unanimous decision.

On six days' notice, replacing Lucas Rocha who withdrew due to undisclosed reasons, Durden faced Jafel Filho on April 25, 2026 in a bantamweight bout at UFC Fight Night 274. He won the fight by unanimous decision.

Durden was scheduled to face Ode' Osbourne on July 11, 2026 at UFC 329. However, Osbourne had to withdraw due to an undisclosed injury and was replaced by Alessandro Costa. Durden lost the fight via a rear-naked choke submission in the second round.

Durden's fight with Osbourne was rescheduled for October 31, 2026 on UFC Fight Night 292. Durden won the fight by unanimous decision.

== Personal life ==
Durden has a son (born 2011) from a previous relationship and is a stepfather for his current wife's daughter.

== Championships and accomplishments ==
=== Mixed martial arts ===
- Ultimate Fighting Championship
  - Performance of the Night (One Time) vs. Matt Schnell
- Valor Fighting Challenge
  - VF Bantamweight Championship (One time; former)

== Mixed martial arts record ==
Professional record breakdown
31 matches	19 wins	11 losses
By knockout	6	2
By submission	6	6
By decision	7	3
Draws	1	

Res.	Record	Opponent	Method	Event	Date	Round	Time	Location	Notes
Win	19–11–1	Ode' Osbourne	Decision (unanimous)	UFC Fight Night: Moicano vs. Nolan	October 31, 2026	3	5:00	Las Vegas, Nevada, United States	
Loss	18–11–1	Alessandro Costa	Submission (rear-naked choke)	UFC 329	July 11, 2026	2	2:19	Las Vegas, Nevada, United States	
Win	18–10–1	Jafel Filho	Decision (unanimous)	UFC Fight Night: Sterling vs. Zalal	April 25, 2026	3	5:00	Las Vegas, Nevada, United States	Bantamweight bout.
Loss	17–10–1	Nyamjargal Tumendemberel	Decision (unanimous)	UFC 326	March 7, 2026	3	5:00	Las Vegas, Nevada, United States	
Loss	17–9–1	Allan Nascimento	Submission (anaconda choke)	UFC Fight Night: Garcia vs. Onama	November 1, 2025	2	3:13	Las Vegas, Nevada, United States	Catchweight (130 lb) bout.
Loss	17–8–1	Jose Ochoa	KO (punches)	UFC on ESPN: Usman vs. Buckley	June 14, 2025	2	0:11	Atlanta, Georgia, United States	
Loss	17–7–1	Joshua Van	Decision (unanimous)	UFC 310	December 7, 2024	3	5:00	Las Vegas, Nevada, United States	
Win	17–6–1	Matt Schnell	Submission (ninja choke)	UFC Fight Night: Burns vs. Brady	September 7, 2024	2	0:29	Las Vegas, Nevada, United States	Bantamweight bout. Performance of the Night.
Loss	16–6–1	Bruno Gustavo da Silva	TKO (punches)	UFC on ESPN: Lemos vs. Jandiroba	July 20, 2024	2	2:58	Las Vegas, Nevada, United States	
Loss	16–5–1	Tagir Ulanbekov	Submission (face crank)	UFC 296	December 16, 2023	2	4:25	Las Vegas, Nevada, United States	
Win	16–4–1	Jake Hadley	Decision (unanimous)	UFC on ESPN: Sandhagen vs. Font	August 5, 2023	3	5:00	Nashville, Tennessee, United States	
Win	15–4–1	Charles Johnson	Decision (unanimous)	UFC on ESPN: Song vs. Simón	April 29, 2023	3	5:00	Las Vegas, Nevada, United States	
Win	14–4–1	Carlos Mota	Decision (unanimous)	UFC Fight Night: Kattar vs. Allen	October 29, 2022	3	5:00	Las Vegas, Nevada, United States	
Win	13–4–1	JP Buys	TKO (punches)	UFC on ESPN: Tsarukyan vs. Gamrot	June 25, 2022	1	1:08	Las Vegas, Nevada, United States	
Loss	12–4–1	Muhammad Mokaev	Submission (guillotine choke)	UFC Fight Night: Volkov vs. Aspinall	March 19, 2022	1	0:58	London, England	
Win	12–3–1	Aori Qileng	Decision (unanimous)	UFC Fight Night: Vieira vs. Tate	November 20, 2021	3	5:00	Las Vegas, Nevada, United States	
Loss	11–3–1	Jimmy Flick	Submission (flying triangle choke)	UFC Fight Night: Thompson vs. Neal	December 19, 2020	1	3:18	Las Vegas, Nevada, United States	Return to Flyweight.
Draw	11–2–1	Chris Gutiérrez	Draw (unanimous)	UFC Fight Night: Brunson vs. Shahbazyan	August 1, 2020	3	5:00	Las Vegas, Nevada, United States	
Win	11–2	John Sweeney	TKO (punches)	National FC 125	July 18, 2020	1	1:20	Conyers, Georgia, United States	
Win	10–2	Varon Webb	Submission (rear-naked choke)	National FC 124	March 7, 2020	1	3:17	Atlanta, Georgia, United States	
Win	9–2	Dre Miley	TKO (punches)	Valor Fighting Challenge 66	November 1, 2019	2	4:37	Knoxville, Tennessee, United States	Won the vacant VF Bantamweight Championship.
Win	8–2	Jeremy Rogers	Submission (armbar)	Valor Fighting Challenge 59	May 18, 2019	1	0:59	Kodak, Tennessee, United States	
Win	7–2	Dylan Schulte	TKO (slam)	Sparta Combat League: Army vs. Marines 10	April 27, 2019	1	0:30	Loveland, Colorado, United States	Catchweight (130 lb) bout.
Win	6–2	Todd Monroe	Submission (armbar)	864 FC 9	November 30, 2018	3	4:56	Duluth, Georgia, United States	Return to Bantamweight.
Win	5–2	Todd Monroe	TKO (punches)	864 FC 5	July 21, 2018	1	3:15	Greenville, South Carolina, United States	Catchweight (127 lb) bout.
Loss	4–2	Ryan Hollis	Submission (rear-naked choke)	864 FC 3	March 24, 2018	2	3:39	Greenville, South Carolina, United States	Catchweight (130 lb) bout.
Loss	4–1	Jared Scoggins	Decision (unanimous)	National FC 97	July 22, 2017	3	5:00	Duluth, Georgia, United States	Flyweight debut. For the NFC Flyweight Championship.
Win	4–0	Dave Morgan	Submission (guillotine choke)	National FC 92	March 24, 2017	1	0:39	Kennesaw, Georgia, United States	
Win	3–0	Devante Sewell	Decision (unanimous)	National FC 88	November 11, 2016	3	5:00	Atlanta, Georgia, United States	
Win	2–0	Damarcus Holmes	Submission (rear-naked choke)	National FC 85	July 22, 2016	1	1:01	Kennesaw, Georgia, United States	
Win	1–0	Marcus Levester	TKO (punches)	National FC 83	March 25, 2016	1	1:30	Atlanta, Georgia, United States	Bantamweight debut.

== Professional boxing record ==
4 fights	4 wins	0 losses
By decision	4	0

No.	Result	Record	Opponent	Type	Round, time	Date	Location	Notes
4	Win	4–0	Justin Tyler Parker	UD	4	April 27, 2019	Budweiser Events Center, Loveland, Colorado, U.S.	
3	Win	3–0	Isidro Guzman	UD	4	March 9, 2019	Georgia World Congress Center, Atlanta, Georgia, U.S.	
2	Win	2–0	Matt Murphy	UD	4	August 11, 2018	Georgia World Congress Center, Atlanta, Georgia, U.S.	
1	Win	1–0	Andre Knighten	UD	4	December 9, 2017	Belle of Baton Rouge, Baton Rouge, Louisiana, U.S.	

== See also ==
- List of current UFC fighters
- List of male mixed martial artists
