= Felipe Colares =

Brazilian mixed martial arts fighter (1994–2023)

- Born: Luis Felipe Dias Colares; 31 March 1994; Macapá, Amapá, Brazil
- Died: 1 May 2023 (aged 29); Rio de Janeiro, Brazil
- Other names: Cabocão
- Height: 1.75 m (5 ft 9 in)
- Weight: 61 kg (134 lb; 9 st 8 lb)
- Division: Bantamweight; Featherweight
- Reach: 175 cm (69 in)
- Stance: Orthodox
- Fighting out of: Macapá, Amapá, Brazil
- Team: Knockout Team (until 2014); Team Nogueira (2014–2023)
- Rank: Black belt in Brazilian jiu-jitsu Black belt in judo
- Years active: 2013–2023

Mixed martial arts record
- Total: 16
- Wins: 12
- By knockout: 2
- By submission: 7
- By decision: 3
- Losses: 4
- By knockout: 1
- By decision: 3

Other information
- Mixed martial arts record from Sherdog

Luis Felipe Dias Colares (31 March 1994 – 1 May 2023) was a Brazilian mixed martial artist in the bantamweight division. A professional since 2013, he most notably competed for the Ultimate Fighting Championship (UFC).

== Background ==
Growing up in Macapá, Amapá, Colares started training judo at the age of seven and picked up Brazilian jiu-jitsu, taekwondo, and Muay Thai at 15.

== Mixed martial arts career ==
=== Early career ===
Colares compiled an undefeated MMA record of 8–0 fighting within the Brazilian regional MMA circuit, culminating with his win of the Jungle Fight featherweight title before signing with the UFC in January 2019.

=== Ultimate Fighting Championship ===
Colares made his UFC debut as a lightweight against Geraldo de Freitas on 2 February 2019 at UFC Fight Night: Assunção vs. Moraes 2. He lost the fight via unanimous decision.

Colares then returned to bantamweight and faced Domingo Pilarte on 20 July 2019 at UFC on ESPN: dos Anjos vs. Edwards. He won the fight via split decision.

Colares then faced Montel Jackson on 25 January 2020 at UFC Fight Night: Blaydes vs. dos Santos. He lost the fight via unanimous decision.

Colares was scheduled to face Gustavo Lopez on 7 November 2020 at UFC Fight Night 182 However, he pulled out of the scheduled bantamweight bout against Gustavo Lopez during fight week after he tested positive for COVID-19.

Colares was initially scheduled to face Journey Newson at UFC on ESPN 23 on 1 May 2021. However, Newson withdrew from the bout and was replaced by Luke Sanders – whose opponent also withdrew from the event – in a featherweight bout on 1 May 2021 at UFC on ESPN 23. Colares was knocked down multiple times in the first round, but won the bout via unanimous decision.

Colares faced Chris Gutiérrez on 9 October 2021 at UFC Fight Night 194. He lost the fight via split decision.

Colares faced Chase Hooper on May 21, 2022, at UFC Fight Night 206. He lost the fight via technical knockout in round three.

On June 9, 2022, it was announced that Colares was released from the UFC.

=== Post UFC ===
Colares made his first appearance post-UFC release on February 17, 2023, at Ares FC 12, submitting Alioune Nahaye via rear-naked choke in the first round.

== Death ==
On 1 May 2023, while Colares was returning from his morning training at Team Nogueira in the western part of Rio de Janeiro, he was run over by a bus. Firefighters arrived at the scene and he was taken to Richa Faria Hospital with multiple injuries. He died en route at age 29.

== Championships and accomplishments ==
- Jungle Fight
  - Jungle Fight Featherweight Championship (One time)

== Mixed martial arts record ==
Professional record breakdown
15 matches	11 wins	4 losses
By knockout	2	1
By submission	6	0
By decision	3	3

Res.	Record	Opponent	Method	Event	Date	Round	Time	Location	Notes
Win	11–4	Alioune Nahaye	Submission (rear-naked choke)	Ares FC 12	17 February 2023	1	2:46	Paris, France	
Loss	10–4	Chase Hooper	TKO (punches)	UFC Fight Night: Holm vs. Vieira	21 May 2022	3	3:00	Las Vegas, Nevada, United States	Return to Featherweight.
Loss	10–3	Chris Gutiérrez	Decision (split)	UFC Fight Night: Dern vs. Rodriguez	9 October 2021	3	5:00	Las Vegas, Nevada, United States	
Win	10–2	Luke Sanders	Decision (unanimous)	UFC on ESPN: Reyes vs. Procházka	1 May 2021	3	5:00	Las Vegas, Nevada, United States	Featherweight bout.
Loss	9–2	Montel Jackson	Decision (unanimous)	UFC Fight Night: Blaydes vs. dos Santos	25 January 2020	3	5:00	Raleigh, North Carolina, United States	
Win	9–1	Domingo Pilarte	Decision (split)	UFC on ESPN: dos Anjos vs. Edwards	20 July 2019	3	5:00	San Antonio, Texas, United States	Return to Bantamweight.
Loss	8–1	Geraldo de Freitas	Decision (unanimous)	UFC Fight Night: Assunção vs. Moraes 2	2 February 2019	3	5:00	Fortaleza, Brazil	
Win	8–0	Caio Gregorio	Decision (unanimous)	Jungle Fight 92	30 September 2017	3	5:00	Belo Horizonte, Brazil	Won the vacant Jungle Fight Featherweight Championship.
Win	7–0	Jordano Abdon	Submission (arm-triangle choke)	Jungle Fight 86	30 April 2016	3	3:25	Palmas, Brazil	
Win	6–0	Thiago Luis Bonifácio Silva	TKO (retirement)	Jungle Fight 83	28 November 2015	1	2:38	Rio de Janeiro, Brazil	Featherweight debut.
Win	5–0	Clesio Silva	Submission (rear-naked choke)	Max Fight 15: Ilha Comprida	4 July 2015	2	4:50	Ilha Comprida, Brazil	
Win	4–0	Eduardo Hanke	Submission (guillotine choke)	Talent MMA Circuit 12: Campinas 2014	20 September 2014	1	4:14	Campinas, Brazil	
Win	3–0	Eder Costa da Gama	Submission (guillotine choke)	North Extreme Cagefighting 12	30 November 2013	1	2:18	Macapá, Brazil	
Win	2–0	David William da Silva Farias	KO	ExpoFight Amapá	1 October 2013	1	3:10	Macapá, Brazil	
Win	1–0	Evandro Souza Balieiro	Submission (guillotine choke)	North Extreme Cagefighting 9	20 July 2013	1	N/A	Macapá, Brazil	Bantamweight debut.

== See also ==
- List of male mixed martial artists
