= Luke Sanders =

American mixed martial arts fighter (born 1985)

- Born: Luke Daniel Sanders; December 12, 1985 (age 40); Brenham, Texas, United States
- Other names: Cool Hand
- Nationality: American
- Height: 5 ft 7 in (1.70 m)
- Weight: 145 lb (66 kg; 10 st 5 lb)
- Division: Featherweight; Bantamweight
- Reach: 71 in (180 cm)
- Stance: Orthodox
- Fighting out of: Scottsdale, Arizona, United States
- Team: Nashville MMA; The MMA Lab (2010–2019); Fight Ready (2019–2021)
- Years active: 2011–2021

Mixed martial arts record
- Total: 18
- Wins: 13
- By knockout: 7
- By submission: 2
- By decision: 4
- Losses: 5
- By knockout: 1
- By submission: 3
- By decision: 1

Other information
- Mixed martial arts record from Sherdog

Luke Daniel Sanders (born December 12, 1985) is a retired American mixed martial artist who competed in the Bantamweight division. A professional competitor since 2011, he also competed for the Ultimate Fighting Championship (UFC), Strikeforce and the RFA.

== Background ==
Born in Brenham, Texas and raised in Clarksville, Tennessee, Sanders was athletic from a young age; he won national titles in BMX and finished fourth at the grand nationals event in 1992 at the age of seven. He started wrestling in the second grade, winning a state championship for Montgomery Central High School in 2004 at 145 lbs. Sanders also played hockey, winning two state championships in 2001 and 2002. He began competing in Toughman contests at the age of 17, winning several tournaments, and holds an amateur boxing record of 9–0.

== Mixed martial arts career ==
=== Early career ===
Sanders compiled an amateur record of 4-0 before making his professional debut for Strikeforce in 2011. Sanders won via TKO in the first round. He then continued his unbeaten streak, compiling a record of 10-0 before being signed by the UFC.

=== Ultimate Fighting Championship ===
Sanders made his promotional debut as a short notice injury replacement on January 17, 2016, against Maximo Blanco at UFC Fight Night 81. He won the fight via submission in the first round and was awarded a Performance of the Night bonus.

Sanders next faced Iuri Alcântara on March 4, 2017, at UFC 209. He was handed his first professional loss via submission (kneebar) in the second round.

Sanders was scheduled to face Felipe Arantes on September 16, 2017, at UFC Fight Night 116. However, the fight was scrapped after Arantes fell sick on September 14 from an undisclosed illness.

Sanders was expected to face Bryan Caraway on December 9, 2017, at UFC Fight Night 123. However, on November 20, Caraway pulled out from the fight with undisclosed reason and he was replaced by Andre Soukhamthath. Sanders lost the fight via TKO in the second round. California State Athletic Commission (CSAC) flagged Sanders, after the event, of gaining more than 10% of weight from weight-in weight against on fight day weight, from 135.6 Ibs to 154.5 Ibs, which well over the commission regulation contracted weight of staying within 10% body weight gain for CSAC would not license to Sanders to fight in bantamweight bout in California.

Sanders faced Patrick Williams on April 14, 2018, at UFC on Fox 29. Despite knocking Williams down in the first round, Sanders went on to win the fight via unanimous decision. The bout marked the last of Sanders' prevailing contract and after entertaining other offers, he opted to re-sign with the UFC.

Sanders faced Rani Yahya on August 25, 2018, at UFC Fight Night 135. He lost the fight via heel hook submission in the first round.

Sanders faced Renan Barão on February 17, 2018, at UFC on ESPN 1. At the weigh-ins, Barão weighed in at 138 pounds, 2 pounds over the Bantamweight non-title fight upper limit of 136 lbs. As a result, the bout proceeded at catchweight and Barão was fined 20% of his purse which went to Sanders. Sanders won the fight via knockout in the second round. This fight earned him the Performance of the Night award.

Sanders was scheduled to face Chris Gutiérrez on August 1, 2020, at UFC Fight Night: Brunson vs. Shahbazyan. However, Sanders was removed from the bout in mid-July for undisclosed reasons and replaced by promotional newcomer Cody Durden.

Sanders faced Nate Maness on November 28, 2020, at UFC on ESPN: Blaydes vs. Lewis. He lost the fight via second round submission.

Sanders was initially scheduled to face Damon Jackson on May 1, 2021, at UFC on ESPN: Reyes vs. Procházka. However, Jackson withdrew from the bout and was replaced by Felipe Colares – whose opponent also withdrew from the event – in a featherweight bout. Despite knocking Colares down multiple times in the first round, Sanders lost the bout via unanimous decision. The bout was the last of his prevailing contract and it was not renewed, making Sanders a free agent.

On May 8, 2021, It was announced that Sanders has retired from mixed martial arts.

== Personal life ==
As of 2023, Luke is happily married and continuing to grow his family with his wife.

== Championships and accomplishments ==
- Ultimate Fighting Championship
  - Performance of the Night (Two times) vs. Maximo Blanco & Renan Barão
- Resurrection Fighting Alliance
  - RFA Bantamweight Championship (One time; former)
    - One successful title defense

== Mixed martial arts record ==
Professional record breakdown
18 matches	13 wins	5 losses
By knockout	7	1
By submission	2	3
By decision	4	1

Res.	Record	Opponent	Method	Event	Date	Round	Time	Location	Notes
Loss	13–5	Felipe Colares	Decision (unanimous)	UFC on ESPN: Reyes vs. Procházka	May 1, 2021	3	5:00	Las Vegas, Nevada, United States	Featherweight bout.
Loss	13–4	Nate Maness	Submission (rear-naked choke)	UFC on ESPN: Smith vs. Clark	November 28, 2020	2	2:29	Las Vegas, Nevada, United States	Catchweight (140 lb) bout.
Win	13–3	Renan Barão	KO (punches)	UFC on ESPN: Ngannou vs. Velasquez	February 17, 2019	2	1:01	Phoenix, Arizona, United States	Catchweight (138 lb) bout; Barão missed weight. Performance of the Night.
Loss	12–3	Rani Yahya	Submission (heel hook)	UFC Fight Night: Gaethje vs. Vick	August 25, 2018	1	1:31	Lincoln, Nebraska, United States	
Win	12–2	Patrick Williams	Decision (unanimous)	UFC on Fox: Poirier vs. Gaethje	April 14, 2018	3	5:00	Glendale, Arizona, United States	
Loss	11–2	Andre Soukhamthath	TKO (punches)	UFC Fight Night: Swanson vs. Ortega	December 9, 2017	2	1:06	Fresno, California, United States	
Loss	11–1	Iuri Alcântara	Submission (kneebar)	UFC 209	March 4, 2017	2	3:13	Las Vegas, Nevada, United States	Sanders was deducted one point in round 1 due to an illegal knee.
Win	11–0	Maximo Blanco	Submission (rear-naked choke)	UFC Fight Night: Dillashaw vs. Cruz	January 17, 2016	1	3:38	Boston, Massachusetts, United States	Featherweight bout. Performance of the Night.
Win	10–0	Terrion Ware	Decision (unanimous)	AXS TV Fights: RFA vs. Legacy FC	May 8, 2015	5	5:00	Robinsonville, Mississippi, United States	Defended the RFA Bantamweight Championship.
Win	9–0	Jarred Mercado	TKO (knee and punches)	RFA 20	November 7, 2014	1	1:06	Broomfield, Colorado, United States	Won the vacant RFA Bantamweight Championship.
Win	8–0	Darrick Minner	TKO (punches)	RFA 17	August 22, 2014	2	3:15	Sioux Falls, South Dakota, United States	Bantamweight debut.
Win	7–0	Dan Moret	Decision (unanimous)	RFA 13	March 7, 2014	3	5:00	Lincoln, Nebraska, United States	
Win	6–0	Zach Underwood	TKO (punches)	XFC 26: Night of Champions 3	October 18, 2013	2	3:38	Nashville, Tennessee, United States	
Win	5–0	Javon Wright	Decision (split)	Rhino Fighting Championships 7	July 19, 2013	3	5:00	Spring Hill, Tennessee, United States	
Win	4–0	Zachary Sanders	TKO (punches and elbows)	XFC 18: Music City Mayhem	June 22, 2012	1	4:53	Nashville, Tennessee, United States	
Win	3–0	J.R. Hines	TKO (punches)	Gameness FC 10	November 19, 2011	1	2:08	Goodlettsville, Tennessee, United States	
Win	2–0	Latral Perdue	Submission	Gameness FC 9	April 28, 2011	1	1:07	Goodlettsville, Tennessee, United States	
Win	1–0	Josh Jarvis	TKO (punches)	Strikeforce Challengers: Woodley vs. Saffiedine	January 7, 2011	1	3:15	Nashville, Tennessee, United States	Featherweight debut.

== See also ==
- List of male mixed martial artists
