= Domingo Pilarte (fighter) =

American mixed martial arts fighter

- Born: January 5, 1990 (age 36); Bethesda, Maryland, United States
- Other names: Son Of Fire
- Height: 6 ft 0 in (1.83 m)
- Weight: 135 lb (61 kg; 9 st 9 lb)
- Division: Bantamweight
- Reach: 73.0 in (185 cm)
- Stance: Southpaw
- Fighting out of: Houston, Texas
- Team: Revolution Dojo
- Years active: 2009–present

Mixed martial arts record
- Total: 12
- Wins: 8
- By knockout: 2
- By submission: 4
- By decision: 2
- Losses: 3
- By decision: 3
- No contests: 1

Other information
- Mixed martial arts record from Sherdog

Domingo Pilarte (born January 5, 1990) is an American mixed martial artist who competed in the Bantamweight division of the Ultimate Fighting Championship.

== Mixed martial arts career ==
=== Early career ===
Starting his professional career in 2009, Pilarte compiled a 7–1 record fighting out of promotions in the Houston area, culminating with Pilarte winning a razor thin split decision to current UFC bantamweight Adrian Yañez at LFA 7.

Pilarte faced Vince Morales on July 17, 2018 at Dana White's Contender Series 13. He won the fight via technical submission with a rear-naked choke and secured a contract with the UFC.

=== Ultimate Fighting Championship ===
Pilarte was scheduled to face Brian Kelleher on November 3, 2018 at UFC 230. Pilarte was forced to withdraw from the bout, citing an injury.

Pilarte made his UFC debut against Felipe Colares on July 20, 2019 at UFC on ESPN: dos Anjos vs. Edwards. He lost the fight via split decision.

Pilarte next faced Journey Newson at UFC 247 on February 8, 2020. He lost the fight via TKO within the first minute of the fight. However, on March 25, it was announced by the Texas Department of Licensing and Regulation (TDLR) that Journey Newson tested positive for marijuana in in-competition drug tests. The fight was subsequently overturned to a no contest.

Pilarte faced Brian Kelleher on August 21, 2021 at UFC on ESPN: Cannonier vs. Gastelum. He lost the fight via unanimous decision.

On February 10, 2022, it was announced that Pilarte was released by the UFC.

== Mixed martial arts record ==
Professional record breakdown
12 matches	8 wins	3 losses
By knockout	2	0
By submission	4	0
By decision	2	3
No contests	1	

Res.	Record	Opponent	Method	Event	Date	Round	Time	Location	Notes
Loss	8–3 (1)	Brian Kelleher	Decision (unanimous)	UFC on ESPN: Cannonier vs. Gastelum	August 21, 2021	3	5:00	Las Vegas, Nevada, United States	
NC	8–2 (1)	Journey Newson	NC (overturned)	UFC 247	February 8, 2020	1	0:38	Houston, Texas, United States	Originally a TKO (punches) win for Newson; overturned after he tested positive for marijuana.
Loss	8–2	Felipe Colares	Decision (split)	UFC on ESPN: dos Anjos vs. Edwards	July 20, 2019	3	5:00	San Antonio, Texas, United States	
Win	8–1	Vince Morales	Technical Submission (rear-naked choke)	Dana White's Contender Series 13	July 17, 2018	2	1:52	Las Vegas, Nevada, United States	
Win	7–1	Adrian Yañez	Decision (split)	LFA 7	March 24, 2017	3	5:00	Houston, Texas, United States	
Win	6–1	Chris Pham	KO (punch)	Legacy FC 59	September 16, 2016	1	0:38	Houston, Texas, United States	
Win	5–1	Javier Obregon	Submission (armbar)	Fury FC 8	October 9, 2015	1	2:04	Humble, Texas, United States	
Win	4–1	Joel Scott	Decision (split)	Fury FC 4	February 13, 2015	3	5:00	Humble, Texas, United States	
Loss	3–1	Caio Machado	Decision (unanimous)	Legacy FC 27	January 31, 2014	3	5:00	Houston, Texas, United States	
Win	3–0	Ricardo Delgado	KO (punch)	Legacy FC 15	November 16, 2012	1	1:51	Houston, Texas, United States	
Win	2–0	Gerzan Chaw	Submission (armbar)	International Xtreme Fight Association	December 4, 2010	2	1:56	Houston, Texas, United States	
Win	1–0	Adolfo Ortega	Submission (armbar)	Art of War: Mano A Mano	July 12, 2009	1	0:46	Mesquite, Texas, United States	

== See also ==
- List of current UFC fighters
- List of male mixed martial artists
