= UFC 232 =

UFC mixed martial arts event in 2018

UFC 232: Jones vs. Gustafsson 2
- The poster for UFC 232: Jones vs. Gustafsson 2
- Promotion: Ultimate Fighting Championship
- Date: December 29, 2018
- Venue: The Forum
- City: Inglewood, California
- Attendance: 15,862
- Total gate: $2,066,604

Event chronology
UFC on Fox: Lee vs. Iaquinta 2	UFC 232: Jones vs. Gustafsson 2	UFC Fight Night: Cejudo vs. Dillashaw

UFC 232: Jones vs. Gustafsson 2 was a mixed martial arts event produced by the Ultimate Fighting Championship that was held on December 29, 2018, at The Forum in Inglewood, California.

== Background ==
A UFC Light Heavyweight Championship bout between former champion Jon Jones and former title challenger Alexander Gustafsson headlined this event. As the current divisional champion Daniel Cormier focused on defending his UFC Heavyweight Championship, the promotion indicated that he would be stripped of his title and that the winner of the proposed Jones/Gustafsson bout would become the undisputed champion. Jones and Gustafsson previously fought in September of 2013 at UFC 165 where Jones defended his title via unanimous decision. The rematch was previously booked to headline UFC 178 in September 2014, but the pairing was scrapped after Gustafsson tore his right meniscus and lateral collateral ligament. A day before the event, Cormier relinquished his title as he said "I'd rather walk away this way, than have the history books say I was stripped".

The event was originally expected to take place at T-Mobile Arena in Paradise, Nevada, part of the Las Vegas Metropolitan Area. However on December 23, the event was moved to The Forum in Inglewood, California due to a Jones' drug testing abnormality stemming from earlier that month. The test found a trace amount of turinabol in Jones' system, the same substance he tested positive for in 2017 that led to the 15-month suspension he recently was cleared from in order to fight this week. Because the Nevada State Athletic Commission does not have proper time to investigate in order to keep Jones cleared to fight in Las Vegas, the UFC decided to move the entire event to Inglewood as the California State Athletic Commission would grant Jones a licence. UFC VP of Athlete Health and Performance Jeff Novitzky said USADA, in consultation with other organizations, believes the test is a "pulsing" effect and not a new ingestion of the substance that he tested positive for after UFC 214 in July 2017.

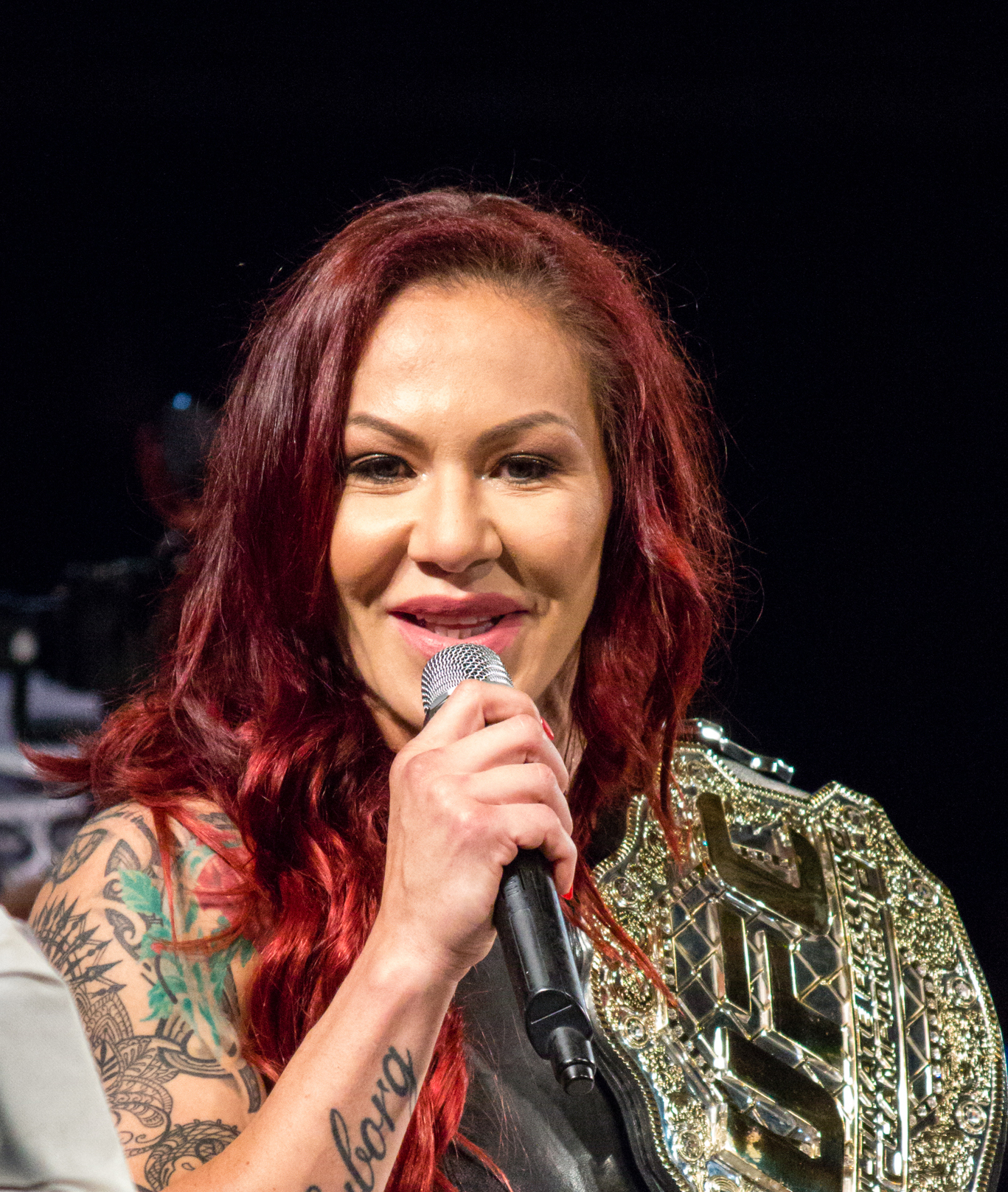
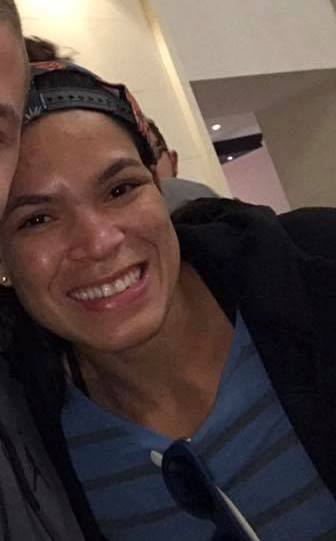
Cyborg (left) had a record of 20–1 (1), with her only loss dating back to 2005 when she made her professional debut. Meanwhile, Nunes (right) had three title defenses and a 16–4 record. This was the first time in UFC history that two current female champions faced each other.

A UFC Women's Featherweight Championship bout between current champion Cris Cyborg (who is also a former Strikeforce Women's Featherweight Champion and Invicta FC Featherweight Champion) and former UFC Women's Bantamweight Champion Amanda Nunes took place at the event. This was the fourth time in UFC history that champions in different divisions fought for the same title, following UFC 94, UFC 205 and UFC 226.

A women's flyweight bout between Sijara Eubanks and Jessica Eye was expected to take place at this event, but Eubanks was pulled from the bout on October 2 in favor of a headliner for the vacant UFC Women's Flyweight Championship against former UFC Women's Bantamweight Championship challenger Valentina Shevchenko at UFC 230. However, that fight was canceled a week later. Eubanks remained on the card at UFC 230 and fought against former title challenger Roxanne Modafferi, while Eye found a new opponent at UFC 231.

Tom Duquesnoy was expected to face Nathaniel Wood at the event. However, Duquesnoy pulled out of the fight on November 12 citing a rib injury. Wood then faced Andre Ewell.

A bantamweight bout between Brian Kelleher and Montel Jackson was initially slated to take place at UFC 230. However the fight was cancelled on the day of the event due to a medical issue for Kelleher and was rescheduled for this event. At the weigh-ins, Jackson weighed in at 137 lb, 1 pound over the bantamweight non-title fight limit of 136 lb. He was fined 20% of his fight purse, and Kelleher proceeded at catchweight.

== Results ==
Main Card
Weight class				Method	Round	Time	Notes
Light Heavyweight	Jon Jones	def.	Alexander Gustafsson	KO (punches)	3	2:02	(Note: For the vacant UFC Light Heavyweight Championship.)
Women's Featherweight	Amanda Nunes	def.	Cris Cyborg (c)	KO (punch)	1	0:51	(Note: For the UFC Women's Featherweight Championship.)
Welterweight	Michael Chiesa	def.	Carlos Condit	Submission (kimura)	2	0:56
Light Heavyweight	Corey Anderson	def.	Ilir Latifi	Decision (unanimous) (29–28, 29–28, 29–28)	3	5:00
Featherweight	Alexander Volkanovski	def.	Chad Mendes	TKO (punches)	2	4:14
Preliminary Card (Fox Sports 1)
Heavyweight	Walt Harris	vs.	Andrei Arlovski	No Contest (overturned)	3	5:00	(Note: Originally a split decision (27-30, 29-28, 29-28) win for Harris; overturned after he tested positive for LGD-4033)
Women's Featherweight	Megan Anderson	def.	Cat Zingano	TKO (eye injury)	1	1:01
Bantamweight	Petr Yan	def.	Douglas Silva de Andrade	TKO (corner stoppage)	2	5:00
Lightweight	Ryan Hall	def.	B.J. Penn	Submission (heel hook)	1	2:46
Early Preliminary Card (UFC Fight Pass)
Bantamweight	Nathaniel Wood	def.	Andre Ewell	Submission (rear-naked choke)	3	4:12
Middleweight	Uriah Hall	def.	Bevon Lewis	KO (punch)	3	1:32
Welterweight	Curtis Millender	def.	Siyar Bahadurzada	Decision (unanimous) (29–28, 29–28, 30–27)	3	5:00
Catchweight (137 lb)	Montel Jackson	def.	Brian Kelleher	Submission (D’Arce choke)	1	1:40

== Bonus awards ==
The following fighters were awarded $50,000 bonuses:

- Fight of the Night: Chad Mendes vs. Alexander Volkanovski
- Performance of the Night: Amanda Nunes and Ryan Hall

== Reported payout ==
The following is the reported payout to the fighters as reported to the California State Athletic Commission. It does not include sponsor money and also does not include the UFC's traditional "fight night" bonuses. The total disclosed payout for the event was $3,506,000.

- Jon Jones: $500,000 (no win bonus) def. Alexander Gustafsson: $500,000
- Amanda Nunes: $350,000 (no win bonus) def. Cris Cyborg: $500,000
- Michael Chiesa: $96,000 ($48,000 win bonus) def. Carlos Condit: $115,000
- Corey Anderson: $130,000 ($65,000 win bonus) def. Ilir Latifi: $90,000
- Alexander Volkanovski: $125,000 ($60,000 win bonus) def. Chad Mendes: $87,000
- Walt Harris: $72,000 ($36,000 win bonus; fined 4,000) def. Andrei Arlovski: $300,000
- Megan Anderson: $60,000 ($30,000 win bonus) def. Cat Zingano: $50,000
- Petr Yan: $52,000 ($26,000 win bonus) def. Douglas Silva de Andrade: $21,000
- Ryan Hall: $38,000 ($19,000 win bonus) def. B.J. Penn: $150,000
- Nathaniel Wood: $24,000 ($12,000 win bonus) def. Andre Ewell: $12,000
- Uriah Hall: $110,000 ($55,000 win bonus) def. Bevon Lewis: $12,000
- Curtis Millender: $36,000 ($18,000 win bonus) def. Siyar Bahadurzada: $33,000
- Montel Jackson: $16,000* ($10,000 win bonus) def. Brian Kelleher: $27,000

* Montel Jackson was fined $4,000, 20 percent of his purse for failing to make the required weight for his fight with Brian Kelleher. That money will be issued to Kelleher.

== Aftermath ==
Nunes became the first woman to be champion in two divisions simultaneously and third fighter overall (after Conor McGregor at UFC 205 and Daniel Cormier at UFC 226), as well as the sixth person overall to win a title in different divisions.

On January 23, 2019, it was reported that Walt Harris failed a fight-night drug test and was temporarily suspended by the CSAC. He tested positive for LGD-4033, a muscle-wasting medication in the same family of selective androgen receptor modulators (SARMs) like ostarine. On February 28, Harris was suspended for four months (retroactive to the day of the fight) and fined $4,000 by the CSAC for the failed drug test, as he was able prove that he ingested the substance via a tainted supplement. His fight against former UFC Heavyweight Champion Andrei Arlovski was overturned to a no contest.

== See also ==
- List of UFC events
- 2018 in UFC
- List of current UFC fighters
