= 2018 in UFC =

Mixed martial arts events

Information
- First date: January 14
- Last date: December 29

Events
- Total events: 39
- UFC: 13
- UFC on Fox: 5
- TUF Finale events: 2

Fights
- Total fights: 473
- Title fights: 18

Chronology
2017 in UFC	2018 in UFC	2019 in UFC

The year 2018 was the 26th year in the history of the Ultimate Fighting Championship (UFC), a mixed martial arts promotion based in the United States and founded in November 1993. This year, the UFC celebrated its 25th anniversary, and an anniversary event was held on November 10, 2018 in Denver, Colorado, the city where the historical UFC 1 was held.

== 2018 UFC.com awards ==
2018 UFC.COM Awards
No	Best Fighter	The Upsets	The Submissions	The Newcomers	The Knockouts	The Fights
1	Daniel Cormier	Alexander Hernandez defeats Beneil Dariush; UFC 222	Ryan Hall defeats B.J. Penn; UFC 232	Israel Adesanya	Yair Rodríguez defeats The Korean Zombie; UFC Fight Night: The Korean Zombie vs. Rodríguez	Robert Whittaker defeats Yoel Romero 2 UFC 225
2	Amanda Nunes	Chris Gruetzemacher defeats Joe Lauzon; UFC 223	Paul Craig defeats Magomed Ankalaev; UFC Fight Night: Werdum vs. Volkov	Alexander Hernandez	Brian Ortega defeats Frankie Edgar; UFC 222	Dustin Poirier defeats Justin Gaethje 1 UFC on Fox: Poirier vs. Gaethje
3	Khabib Nurmagomedov	Jared Cannonier defeats David Branch; UFC 230	Aljamain Sterling defeats Cody Stamann UFC 228 (Tie); Zabit Magomedsharipov defeats Brandon Davis UFC 228 (Tie)	Mackenzie Dern	Lyoto Machida defeats Vitor Belfort; UFC 224	Yair Rodríguez defeats The Korean Zombie; UFC Fight Night: The Korean Zombie vs. Rodríguez
4	Henry Cejudo	Henry Cejudo defeats Demetrious Johnson 2 UFC 227	Aleksei Oleinik defeats Júnior Albini; UFC 224	Maycee Barber	Amanda Nunes defeats Cris Cyborg; UFC 232	Max Holloway defeats Brian Ortega; UFC 231
5	Valentina Shevchenko	Sergio Pettis defeats Joseph Benavidez; UFC 225	Charles Oliveira defeats Christos Giagos; UFC Fight Night: Santos vs. Anders	Sodiq Yusuff (Tie); Petr Yan (Tie)	Elizeu Zaleski dos Santos defeats Sean Strickland; UFC 224	Tony Ferguson defeats Anthony Pettis; UFC 229
6	Anthony Smith	Corey Anderson defeats Glover Teixeira; UFC Fight Night: Shogun vs. Smith	Adam Wieczorek defeats Arjan Bhullar; UFC on Fox: Poirier vs. Gaethje	Brad Katona	Yoel Romero defeats Luke Rockhold; UFC 221	Ronaldo Souza defeats Chris Weidman; UFC 230
7	Israel Adesanya	Khalil Rountree Jr. defeats Gökhan Saki; UFC 226	Ilir Latifi defeats Ovince Saint Preux; UFC on Fox: Emmett vs. Stephens	Zhang Weili	Jéssica Andrade defeats Karolina Kowalkiewicz; UFC 228	Thiago Santos defeats Jimi Manuwa; UFC 231
8	Ronaldo Souza	Brian Kelleher defeats Renan Barão; UFC 222	Claudio Puelles defeats Felipe Silva; UFC Fight Night: Maia vs. Usman	Johnny Walker	Daniel Cormier defeats Stipe Miocic 1 UFC 226	Calvin Kattar defeats Shane Burgos; UFC 220
9	Dustin Poirier	Nina Ansaroff defeats Cláudia Gadelha; UFC 231	Darren Elkins defeats Michael Johnson; UFC Fight Night: Stephens vs. Choi	Raoni Barcelos	Ismael Bonfim defeats Terrance McKinney; UFC 283	Drew Dober defeats Frank Camacho; UFC on Fox: Jacaré vs. Brunson 2
10	Corey Anderson (Tie); Thiago Santos (Tie); Kamaru Usman (Tie)	Cody Stamann defeats Bryan Caraway; UFC 222	Donald Cerrone defeats Mike Perry; UFC Fight Night: The Korean Zombie vs. Rodríguez	Sijara Eubanks	Derrick Lewis defeats Alexander Volkov; UFC 229	Zabit Magomedsharipov defeats Kyle Bochniak; UFC 223
Ref						

== 2018 by the numbers ==
The numbers below records the events, fights, techniques, champions and fighters held or performed for the year of 2018 in UFC.

Events
Number of Events	PPV	Continents	Countries	Cities	Fight Night Bonuses
39	13	5	11	35	156; Total $7,800,000
Longest Event	Shortest Event	Highest Income Live Gate	Lowest Income Live Gate	Highest Attendance	Lowest Attendance
The Ultimate Fighter 27 Finale 2:46:20	UFC Fight Night: Cowboy vs. Medeiros 1:37:45	UFC 229 $17,200,000	The Ultimate Fighter 28 Finale $204,600	UFC Fight Night: Hunt vs. Oleinik 22,603	The Ultimate Fighter 28 Finale 2,020
Title Fights
Undisputed Title Fights	Title Changes	Champions Remained in Their Divisions	Number of Champions	Number of Interim Champions	Number of Title Defenses
16	3	6 BW – T.J. Dillashaw; FW – Max Holloway; WW – Tyron Woodley; MW – Robert Whittaker; WSW – Rose Namajunas; WBW – Amanda Nunes	13	2	10
Champions
Division	Beginning of The Year	End of The Year	Division	Beginning of The Year	End of The Year
Heavyweight	Stipe Miocic	Daniel Cormier	Bantamweight	T.J. Dillashaw	T.J. Dillashaw
Light Heavyweight	Daniel Cormier	Jon Jones	Flyweight	Demetrious Johnson	Henry Cejudo
Middleweight	Robert Whittaker	Robert Whittaker	Women's Bantamweight	Amanda Nunes	Amanda Nunes
Welterweight	Tyron Woodley	Tyron Woodley	Women's Flyweight	Nicco Montaño	Valentina Shevchenko
Lightweight	Conor McGregor	Khabib Nurmagomedov	Women's Strawweight	Rose Namajunas	Rose Namajunas
Featherweight	Max Holloway	Max Holloway	Women's Featherweight	Cris Cyborg	Amanda Nunes
Fights
Most Knockouts at A Single Event	Most submissions at A Single Event	Most Decisions at A Single Event	Total Number of Fights	Total Number of Cage Time	
UFC 229 7	UFC 224; The Ultimate Fighter 28 Finale 5	UFC Fight Night: Shogun vs. Smith 10	474	87:21:11	
Fighters
Number of Fighters	UFC Debutants	Releases / Retired	Fighters Suspended	Number of Fighters Missed weight	
(At the end of Dec 31, 2018); 573	121	N/A	N/A	29	
Champion feats
Stipe Miocic became the first heavyweight to defend his title three consecutive times.; Henry Cejudo became the first Olympic gold medalist to win a UFC championship.; Daniel Cormier became the first fighter to make a successful title defense in two different weight divisions
Fighter feats
Leon Edwards' knockout at 4:59 of the third round set a record for the latest knockout in a three-round UFC bout.; Corey Anderson's 12 takedowns landed at UFC Fight Night 128 set a new record for the most landed in a UFC light heavyweight bout.; Ricky Simon's submission victory at the 5:00 mark of round three set a new record for the latest finish in a UFC three-round bout.; Lyoto Machida became the first fighter to have two knockout victories from a front kick to the head.; Anthony Pettis' seven submission victories from the bottom position are the most in UFC/WEC/PRIDE/Strikeforce combined company history.; Paulo Costa became the first middleweight to start his UFC career with four consecutive knockout victories.; Charles Oliveira became the UFC's all‑time submission leader by securing his eleventh submission victory.; Gian Villante became the first and only UFC fighter to have four consecutive split decision bouts.; Donald Cerrone became the UFC's all‑time wins leader with his 21st victory, a mark later surpassed by Jim Miller, the current record holder.; Max Holloway set a new UFC record at UFC 231 by landing 290 significant strikes, including 134 in Round 4 — a mark he later surpassed in January 2021.; Edson Barboza became the first fighter to record knockout wins with five different techniques: head kick, body punch, body kick, leg kicks, and a flying knee.

== Title fights ==
Title fights in 2018
Weight class				Method	Round	Time	Event	Notes
Light Heavyweight	Daniel Cormier (c)	def.	Volkan Oezdemir	TKO (punches)	2	2:00	UFC 220	(Note: For the UFC Light Heavyweight Championship.)
Heavyweight	Stipe Miocic (c)	def.	Francis Ngannou	Decision (unanimous) (50-44, 50-44, 50-44)	5	5:00	UFC 220	(Note: For the UFC Heavyweight Championship.)
Middleweight	Yoel Romero	def.	Luke Rockhold	KO (punches)	3	1:48	UFC 221	(Note: For the interim UFC Middleweight Championship (as Romero missed weight, only Rockhold was eligible).)
Women's Featherweight	Cris Cyborg (c)	def	Yana Kunitskaya	TKO (punches)	1	3:25	UFC 222	(Note: For the UFC Women’s Featherweight Championship.)
Women's Strawweight	Rose Namajunas (c)	def	Joanna Jędrzejczyk	Decision (unanimous) (49-46, 49-46, 49-46)	5	5:00	UFC 223	(Note: For the UFC Women's Strawweight Championship.)
Lightweight	Khabib Nurmagomedov	def	Al Iaquinta	Decision (unanimous) (50-44, 50-43, 50-43)	5	5:00	UFC 223	(Note: For the vacant UFC Lightweight Championship.)
Women's Bantamweight	Amanda Nunes (c)	def.	Raquel Pennington	TKO (punches)	5	2:36	UFC 224	(Note: For the UFC Women's Bantamweight Championship.)
Welterweight	Colby Covington	def.	Rafael dos Anjos	Decision (unanimous) (49-46, 48-47, 48-47)	5	5:00	UFC 225	(Note: For the interim UFC Welterweight Championship.)
Heavyweight	Daniel Cormier	def.	Stipe Miocic (c)	KO (punches)	1	4:33	UFC 226	(Note: For the UFC Heavyweight Championship.)
Flyweight	Henry Cejudo	def.	Demetrious Johnson (c)	Decision (split) (48-47, 47-48, 48-47)	5	5:00	UFC 227	(Note: For the UFC Flyweight Championship.)
Bantamweight	T.J. Dillashaw (c)	def.	Cody Garbrandt	TKO (knee and punches)	1	4:17	UFC 227	(Note: For the UFC Bantamweight Championship.)
Welterweight	Tyron Woodley (c)	def.	Darren Till	Submission (D'Arce choke)	2	4:19	UFC 228	(Note: For the UFC Welterweight Championship.)
Lightweight	Khabib Nurmagomedov (c)	def.	Conor McGregor	Submission (neck crank)	4	3:03	UFC 229	(Note: For the UFC Lightweight Championship.)
Heavyweight	Daniel Cormier (c)	def.	Derrick Lewis	Submission (rear-naked choke)	2	2:14	UFC 230	(Note: For the UFC Heavyweight Championship.)
Women's Flyweight	Valentina Shevchenko	def.	Joanna Jędrzejczyk	Decision (unanimous) (49-46, 49-46, 49-46)	5	5:00	UFC 231	(Note: For the vacant UFC Women's Flyweight Championship.)
Featherweight	Max Holloway (c)	def.	Brian Ortega	TKO (doctor stoppage)	4	5:00	UFC 231	(Note: For the UFC Featherweight Championship.)
Women's Featherweight	Amanda Nunes	def.	Cris Cyborg (c)	KO (punch)	1	0:51	UFC 232	(Note: For the UFC Women's Featherweight Championship.)
Light Heavyweight	Jon Jones	def.	Alexander Gustafsson	TKO (punches)	3	2:02	UFC 232	(Note: For the vacant UFC Light Heavyweight Championship.)

== The Ultimate Fighter ==
The following The Ultimate Fighter seasons are scheduled for broadcast in 2018:

Season	Finale	Division	Winner	Runner-up	Ref
TUF 27: Undefeated	July 6, 2018	Lightweight	Mike Trizano	Joe Giannetti	
TUF 27: Undefeated	July 6, 2018	Featherweight	Brad Katona	Jay Cucciniello	
TUF 28: Heavy Hitters	November 30, 2018	Heavyweight	Juan Francisco Espino Dieppa	Justin Frazier	
TUF 28: Heavy Hitters	November 30, 2018	Women's Featherweight	Macy Chiasson	Pannie Kianzad	

== Debut UFC fighters ==
The following fighters fought their first UFC fight in 2018:

Month	Day	ISO	Fighter	Division	Event
January	14	(United States)	Matt Frevola	Lightweight	UFC Fight Night 124
January	20	(United States)	Brandon Davis	Featherweight	UFC 220
January	20	(United States)	Dan Ige	Featherweight	UFC 220
January	20	(United States)	Julio Arce	Featherweight	UFC 220
January	20	(United States)	Matt Bessette	Featherweight	UFC 220
January	27	(United States)	Austin Arnett	Featherweight	UFC on Fox 27
January	27	(United States)	Cory Sandhagen	Bantamweight	UFC on Fox 27
February	3	(United States)	Maia Stevenson	Women's Strawweight	UFC Fight Night 125
February	3	(Brazil)	Polyana Viana	Women's Strawweight	UFC Fight Night 125
February	3	(Brazil)	Priscila Cachoeira	Women's Flyweight	UFC Fight Night 125
February	11	(Nigeria)	Israel Adesanya	Middleweight	UFC 221
February	18	(United States)	Curtis Millender	Welterweight	UFC Fight Night 126
February	18	(United States)	Geoff Neal	Welterweight	UFC Fight Night 126
February	18	(United States)	Steven Peterson	Featherweight	UFC Fight Night 126
February	18	(United States)	Tim Williams	Middleweight	UFC Fight Night 126
February	24	(United States)	Manny Bermudez	Bantamweight	UFC on Fox 28
February	24	(Poland)	Marcin Prachnio	Light Heavyweight	UFC on Fox 28
March	3	(United States)	Alexander Hernandez	Lightweight	UFC 222
March	3	(United States)	Mackenzie Dern	Women's Strawweight	UFC 222
March	3	(Russia)	Yana Kunitskaya	Women's Featherweight	UFC 222
March	17	(United States)	Charles Byrd	Middleweight	UFC Fight Night 127
March	17	(Canada)	Hakeem Dawodu	Featherweight	UFC Fight Night 127
March	17	(Wales)	John Phillips	Middleweight	UFC Fight Night 127
March	17	(Russia)	Dmitriy Sosnovskiy	Heavyweight	UFC Fight Night 127
March	17	(Russia)	Magomed Ankalaev	Light Heavyweight	UFC Fight Night 127
April	7	(United States)	Mike Rodriguez	Light Heavyweight	UFC 223
April	14	(United States)	Dan Moret	Lightweight	UFC on Fox 29
April	14	(United States)	Lauren Mueller	Women's Flyweight	UFC on Fox 29
April	21	(United States)	Ricky Simón	Bantamweight	UFC Fight Night 128
April	21	(United States)	Ricky Rainey	Welterweight	UFC Fight Night 128
May	19	(United States)	Andrea Lee	Women's Flyweight	UFC Fight Night 129
May	27	(Italy)	Carlo Pedersoli Jr.	Welterweight	UFC Fight Night 130
May	27	(England)	Craig White	Welterweight	UFC Fight Night 130
May	27	(England)	Molly McCann	Women's Flyweight	UFC Fight Night 130
May	27	(United States)	Ricky Rainey	Welterweight	UFC Fight Night 130
June	1	(United States)	Chance Rencountre	Welterweight	UFC Fight Night 131
June	1	(United States)	Jose Torres	Flyweight	UFC Fight Night 131
June	1	(England)	Nathaniel Wood	Bantamweight	UFC Fight Night 131
June	1	(United States)	Sijara Eubanks	Women's Flyweight	UFC Fight Night 131
June	9	(Australia)	Megan Anderson	Women's Featherweight	UFC 225
June	9	(United States)	Mike Jackson	Welterweight	UFC 225
June	23	(Mexico)	Hector Aldana	Welterweight	UFC Fight Night 132
June	23	(Russia)	Petr Yan	Bantamweight	UFC Fight Night 132
July	6	(Costa Rica)	Allan Zuñiga	Lightweight	TUF 27 Finale
July	6	(Canada)	Brad Katona	Bantamweight	TUF 27 Finale
July	6	(United States)	Bryce Mitchell	Featherweight	TUF 27 Finale
July	6	(England)	Jay Cucciniello	Featherweight	TUF 27 Finale
July	6	(United States)	Joe Giannetti	Lightweight	TUF 27 Finale
July	6	(United States)	John Gunther	Lightweight	TUF 27 Finale
July	6	(United States)	Luis Peña	Lightweight	TUF 27 Finale
July	6	(Republic of Ireland)	Richie Smullen	Lightweight	TUF 27 Finale
July	6	(United States)	Michael Trizano	Lightweight	TUF 27 Finale
July	6	(United States)	Tyler Diamond	Featherweight	
July	14	(Bulgaria)	Blagoy Ivanov	Heavyweight	UFC Fight Night 133
July	14	(United States)	Elias Garcia	Flyweight	UFC Fight Night 133
July	14	(Brazil)	Jennifer Maia	Women's Flyweight	UFC Fight Night 133
July	14	(Brazil)	Raoni Barcelos	Bantamweight	UFC Fight Night 133
July	14	(Russia)	Said Nurmagomedov	Bantamweight	UFC Fight Night 133
July	22	(Morocco)	Abu Azaitar	Middleweight	UFC Fight Night 134
July	22	(Serbia)	Darko Stošić	Light Heavyweight	UFC Fight Night 134
July	22	(Germany)	David Zawada	Welterweight	UFC Fight Night 134
July	22	(Germany)	Khalid Taha	Bantamweight	UFC Fight Night 134
July	22	(China)	Liu Pingyuan	Bantamweight	UFC Fight Night 134
July	22	(England)	Nad Narimani	Featherweight	UFC Fight Night 134
July	22	(Serbia)	Stefan Sekulić	Welterweight	UFC Fight Night 134
August	4	(United States)	Kevin Holland	Middleweight	UFC 227
August	4	(United States)	Matt Sayles	Featherweight	UFC 227
August	4	(United States)	Montel Jackson	Bantamweight	UFC 227
August	4	(China)	Zhang Weili	Women's Strawweight	UFC 227
September	15	(Russia)	Adam Yandiev	Middleweight	UFC Fight Night 136
September	15	(Russia)	Alexey Kunchenko	Welterweight	UFC Fight Night 136
September	15	(South Korea)	Jin Soo Son	Bantamweight	UFC Fight Night 136
September	15	(Russia)	Khalid Murtazaliev	Middleweight	UFC Fight Night 136
September	22	(United States)	Andre Ewell	Bantamweight	UFC Fight Night 137
September	22	(Brazil)	Augusto Sakai	Heavyweight	UFC Fight Night 137
September	22	(United States)	Christos Giagos	Lightweight	UFC Fight Night 137
September	22	(Brazil)	Livia Renata Souza	Women's Strawweight	UFC Fight Night 137
September	22	(Brazil)	Luigi Vendramini	Lightweight	UFC Fight Night 137
September	22	(Brazil)	Mayra Bueno Silva	Women's Bantamweight	UFC Fight Night 137
September	22	(United States)	Mike Rodríguez	Light Heavyweight	UFC Fight Night 137
September	22	(United States)	Ryan Spann	Light Heavyweight	UFC Fight Night 137
October	6	(United States)	Jalin Turner	Lightweight	UFC 229
October	27	(England)	Chris Fishgold	Featherweight	UFC Fight Night 138
October	27	(South Africa)	Don Madge	Lightweight	UFC Fight Night 138
October	27	(United States)	Jonathan Martinez	Bantamweight	UFC Fight Night 138
October	27	(United States)	Te'Jovan Edwards	Lightweight	UFC Fight Night 138
November	10	(United States)	Bobby Moffett	Featherweight	UFC Fight Night 139
November	10	(United States)	Devonte Smith	Lightweight	UFC Fight Night 139
November	10	(United States)	Hannah Cifers	Women's Strawweight	UFC Fight Night 139
November	10	(United States)	Maycee Barber	Women's Flyweight	UFC Fight Night 139
November	10	(Brazil)	Thiago Moisés	Lightweight	UFC Fight Night 139
November	17	(Brazil)	Anderson dos Santos	Bantamweight	UFC Fight Night 140
November	17	(United States)	Ian Heinisch	Middleweight	UFC Fight Night 140
November	17	(Peru)	Jesus Pinedo	Featherweight	UFC Fight Night 140
November	17	(Brazil)	Johnny Walker	Light Heavyweight	UFC Fight Night 140
November	17	(Argentina)	Laureano Staropoli	Welterweight	UFC Fight Night 140
November	30	(Kyrgyzstan)	Antonina Shevchenko	Women's Flyweight	TUF 28 Finale
November	30	(United States)	Chris Gutiérrez	Bantamweight	TUF 28 Finale
November	30	(United States)	Edmen Shahbazyan	Middleweight	TUF 28 Finale
November	30	(Spain)	Juan Espino	Heavyweight	TUF 28 Finale
November	30	(Lithuania)	Julija Stoliarenko	Women's Bantamweight	TUF 28 Finale
November	30	(United States)	Justin Frazier	Heavyweight	TUF 28 Finale
November	30	(United States)	Kevin Aguilar	Featherweight	TUF 28 Finale
November	30	(United States)	Leah Letson	Women's Featherweight	TUF 28 Finale
November	30	(United States)	Macy Chiasson	Women's Bantamweight	TUF 28 Finale
November	30	(United States)	Maurice Greene	Heavyweight	TUF 28 Finale
November	30	(Cuba)	Michel Batista	Heavyweight	TUF 28 Finale
November	30	(Sweden)	Pannie Kianzad	Women's Bantamweight	TUF 28 Finale
November	30	(United States)	Roosevelt Roberts	Lightweight	TUF 28 Finale
December	2	(Australia)	Alex Gorgees	Lightweight	UFC Fight Night 142
December	2	(Kazakhstan)	Damir Ismagulov	Lightweight	UFC Fight Night 142
December	2	(Australia)	Jimmy Crute	Light Heavyweight	UFC Fight Night 142
December	2	(New Zealand)	Kai Kara-France	Flyweight	UFC Fight Night 142
December	2	(Nigeria)	Sodiq Yusuff	Featherweight	UFC Fight Night 142
December	2	(Australia)	Suman Mokhtarian	Featherweight	UFC Fight Night 142
December	8	(Canada)	Kyle Nelson	Featherweight	UFC 231
December	15	(United States)	Dwight Grant	Welterweight	UFC on Fox 31
December	15	(United States)	Jordan Griffin	Featherweight	UFC on Fox 31
December	15	(United States)	Juan Adams	Heavyweight	UFC on Fox 31
December	29	(United States)	Bevon Lewis	Middleweight	UFC 232

== Events list ==
#	Event	Date	Venue	Location	Attendance	Ref.
463	UFC 232: Jones vs. Gustafsson 2	December 29, 2018	The Forum	Inglewood, California, U.S.	15,862	
462	UFC on Fox: Lee vs. Iaquinta 2	December 15, 2018	Fiserv Forum	Milwaukee, Wisconsin, U.S.	9,010	
461	UFC 231: Holloway vs. Ortega	December 8, 2018	Scotiabank Arena	Toronto, Ontario, Canada	19,039	
460	UFC Fight Night: dos Santos vs. Tuivasa	December 2, 2018	Adelaide Entertainment Centre	Adelaide, South Australia, Australia	8,652	
459	The Ultimate Fighter: Heavy Hitters Finale	November 30, 2018	Pearl Theatre	Las Vegas, Nevada, U.S.	2,020	
458	UFC Fight Night: Blaydes vs. Ngannou 2	November 25, 2018	Cadillac Arena	Beijing, China	10,302	
457	UFC Fight Night: Magny vs. Ponzinibbio	November 17, 2018	Estadio Luna Park	Buenos Aires, Argentina	10,245	
456	UFC Fight Night: Korean Zombie vs. Rodríguez	November 10, 2018	Pepsi Center	Denver, Colorado, U.S.	11,426	
455	UFC 230: Cormier vs. Lewis	November 3, 2018	Madison Square Garden	New York City, New York, U.S.	17,011	
454	UFC Fight Night: Volkan vs. Smith	October 27, 2018	Avenir Centre	Moncton, New Brunswick	6,282	
453	UFC 229: Khabib vs. McGregor	October 6, 2018	T-Mobile Arena	Las Vegas, Nevada, U.S.	20,034	
452	UFC Fight Night: Santos vs. Anders	September 22, 2018	Ginásio do Ibirapuera	São Paulo, Brazil	9,485	
451	UFC Fight Night: Hunt vs. Oliynyk	September 15, 2018	Olimpiyskiy Arena	Moscow, Russia	22,603	
450	UFC 228: Woodley vs. Till	September 8, 2018	American Airlines Arena	Dallas, Texas, U.S	14,073	
449	UFC Fight Night: Gaethje vs. Vick	August 25, 2018	Pinnacle Bank Arena	Lincoln, Nebraska, U.S.	6,409	
448	UFC 227: Dillashaw vs. Garbrandt 2	August 4, 2018	Staples Center	Los Angeles, California, U.S.	17,794	
447	UFC on Fox: Alvarez vs. Poirier 2	July 28, 2018	Scotiabank Saddledome	Calgary, Alberta, Canada	10,603	
446	UFC Fight Night: Shogun vs. Smith	July 22, 2018	Barclaycard Arena	Hamburg, Germany	7,798	
445	UFC Fight Night: dos Santos vs. Ivanov	July 14, 2018	CenturyLink Arena	Boise, Idaho U.S.	5,648	
444	UFC 226: Miocic vs. Cormier	July 7, 2018	T-Mobile Arena	Las Vegas, Nevada, U.S.	17,464	
443	The Ultimate Fighter: Undefeated Finale	July 6, 2018	Pearl Theater	Las Vegas, Nevada, U.S.	2,123	
442	UFC Fight Night: Cowboy vs. Edwards	June 23, 2018	Singapore Indoor Stadium	Kallang, Singapore	6,419	
441	UFC 225: Whittaker vs. Romero 2	June 9, 2018	United Center	Chicago, Illinois, U.S.	18,117	
440	UFC Fight Night: Rivera vs. Moraes	June 1, 2018	Adirondack Bank Center	Utica, New York, U.S.	5,063	
439	UFC Fight Night: Thompson vs. Till	May 27, 2018	Echo Arena	Liverpool, England, U.K.	8,520	
438	UFC Fight Night: Maia vs. Usman	May 19, 2018	Movistar Arena	Santiago, Chile	11,082	
437	UFC 224: Nunes vs. Pennington	May 12, 2018	Jeunesse Arena	Rio de Janeiro, Brazil	10,696	
436	UFC Fight Night: Barboza vs. Lee	April 21, 2018	Boardwalk Hall	Atlantic City, New Jersey, U.S.	9,541	
435	UFC on Fox: Poirier vs. Gaethje	April 14, 2018	Gila River Arena	Glendale, Arizona, U.S.	11,382	
434	UFC 223: Khabib vs. Iaquinta	April 7, 2018	Barclays Center	Brooklyn, New York, U.S.	17,026	
433	UFC Fight Night: Werdum vs. Volkov	March 17, 2018	The O_{2} Arena	London, England, U.K.	16,274	
432	UFC 222: Cyborg vs. Kunitskaya	March 3, 2018	T-Mobile Arena	Las Vegas, Nevada, U.S.	12,041	
431	UFC on Fox: Emmett vs. Stephens	February 24, 2018	Amway Center	Orlando, Florida, U.S.	10,124	
430	UFC Fight Night: Cowboy vs. Medeiros	February 18, 2018	Frank Erwin Center	Austin, Texas, U.S.	10,502	
429	UFC 221: Romero vs. Rockhold	February 11, 2018	Perth Arena	Perth, Western Australia, Australia	12,437	
428	UFC Fight Night: Machida vs. Anders	February 3, 2018	Arena Guilherme Paraense	Belém, Brazil	10,144	
427	UFC on Fox: Jacaré vs. Brunson 2	January 27, 2018	Spectrum Center	Charlotte, North Carolina, U.S.	10,249	
426	UFC 220: Miocic vs. Ngannou	January 20, 2018	TD Garden	Boston, Massachusetts, U.S.	16,015	
425	UFC Fight Night: Stephens vs. Choi	January 14, 2018	Scottrade Center	St. Louis, Missouri, U.S.	10,052	

== See also ==
- UFC
- List of UFC champions
- List of UFC events
- List of current UFC fighters
