= UFC 222 =

UFC mixed martial arts event in 2018

UFC 222: Cyborg vs. Kunitskaya
- The poster for UFC 222: Cyborg vs. Kunitskaya
- Promotion: Ultimate Fighting Championship
- Date: March 3, 2018
- Venue: T-Mobile Arena
- City: Paradise, Nevada
- Attendance: 12,041
- Total gate: $1,367,672
- Buyrate: 260,000

Event chronology
UFC on Fox: Emmett vs. Stephens	UFC 222: Cyborg vs. Kunitskaya	UFC Fight Night: Werdum vs. Volkov

UFC 222: Cyborg vs. Kunitskaya was a mixed martial arts event produced by the Ultimate Fighting Championship that was held on March 3, 2018, at the T-Mobile Arena in Paradise, Nevada, part of the Las Vegas metropolitan area.

UFC 222 features in the film Road House with filming taking place at the T-Mobile Arena during UFC 285.

== Background ==
A UFC Featherweight Championship bout between champion Max Holloway and former UFC Lightweight Champion Frankie Edgar was expected to serve as the event headliner. The pairing was initially expected to take place three months earlier at UFC 218. However, Edgar pulled out of the fight citing an eye injury. In turn, Holloway pulled out of this bout on February 3, due to a leg injury and the matchup was scrapped.

On the same day of Holloway's withdrawal, the UFC reportedly pursued a UFC Bantamweight Championship bout between current champion T.J. Dillashaw and former champion Cody Garbrandt to headline this event, in what would be a rematch of their UFC 217 encounter, in which Dillashaw recaptured the title with a TKO win. However, Dillashaw declined the offer citing a few reasons: the recent birth of his first child, not being in a training camp, disbelief that Garbrandt deserves the title shot, as well as a targeted UFC Flyweight Championship challenge against the champion Demetrious Johnson (who was, at the time, recovering from a surgery).

On February 7, it was reported that a UFC Women's Featherweight Championship bout between current champion Cris Cyborg (who is also a former Strikeforce Women's Featherweight Champion and Invicta FC Featherweight Champion) and former Invicta FC Bantamweight Champion Yana Kunitskaya would headline the event. Edgar remained on the card, facing Brian Ortega in the co-main event.

A bantamweight bout between former UFC Flyweight Championship challenger and The Ultimate Fighter: Team Bisping vs. Team Miller bantamweight winner John Dodson and Pedro Munhoz is expected to take place at the event. The pairing was originally scheduled to take place one month earlier at UFC Fight Night: Machida vs. Anders but was scrapped from the event after Munhoz missed weight and Dodson did not agree to fight at a catchweight.

Bobby Green was expected to face Beneil Dariush at the event, but pulled out on February 14 due to injury. He was replaced by promotional newcomer Alexander Hernandez.

This event had five split decisions, making it the most split decision bouts in UFC history. UFC 274 in May 2022 also tied this record.

== Results ==
Main Card
Weight class				Method	Round	Time	Notes
Women's Featherweight	Cris Cyborg (c)	def.	Yana Kunitskaya	TKO (punches)	1	3:25	(Note: For the UFC Women's Featherweight Championship.)
Featherweight	Brian Ortega	def.	Frankie Edgar	KO (punch)	1	4:44	(Note: UFC featherweight title eliminator)
Bantamweight	Sean O'Malley	def.	Andre Soukhamthath	Decision (unanimous) (29–27, 29–27, 29–28)	3	5:00
Heavyweight	Andrei Arlovski	def.	Stefan Struve	Decision (unanimous) (29–28, 29–28, 30–27)	3	5:00
Women's Bantamweight	Ketlen Vieira	def.	Cat Zingano	Decision (split) (29–28, 28–29, 29–28)	3	5:00
Preliminary Card (Fox Sports 1)
Women's Strawweight	Mackenzie Dern	def.	Ashley Yoder	Decision (split) (28–29, 29–28, 29–28)	3	5:00
Lightweight	Alexander Hernandez	def.	Beneil Dariush	KO (punch)	1	0:42
Bantamweight	John Dodson	def.	Pedro Munhoz	Decision (split) (28–29, 30–27, 29–28)	3	5:00
Middleweight	C. B. Dollaway	def.	Héctor Lombard	DQ (illegal punches)	1	5:00	(Note: Lombard was disqualified after hitting Dollaway twice after the bell, rendering him unable to continue.)
Preliminary Card (UFC Fight Pass)
Welterweight	Zak Ottow	def.	Mike Pyle	TKO (punches)	1	2:34
Bantamweight	Cody Stamann	def.	Bryan Caraway	Decision (split) (28–29, 29–28, 29–28)	3	5:00
Light Heavyweight	Jordan Johnson	def.	Adam Milstead	Decision (split) (29–28, 27–30, 29–28)	3	5:00

== Bonus awards ==
The following fighters were awarded $50,000 bonuses:

- Fight of the Night: Sean O'Malley vs. Andre Soukhamthath
- Performance of the Night: Brian Ortega and Alexander Hernandez

== Reported payout ==
The following is the reported payout to the fighters as reported to the Nevada State Athletic Commission. It does not include sponsor money and also does not include the UFC's traditional "fight night" bonuses. The total disclosed payout for the event was $2,103,000.

- Cris Cyborg: $500,000 (no win bonus) def. Yana Kunitskaya: $100,000
- Brian Ortega: $200,000 (includes $100,000 win bonus) def. Frankie Edgar: $195,000
- Sean O'Malley: $44,000 (includes $22,000 win bonus) def. Andre Soukhamthath: $19,000
- Andrei Arlovski: $275,000 (no win bonus) def. Stefan Struve: $77,000
- Ketlen Vieira: $60,000 (includes $30,000 win bonus) def. Cat Zingano: $35,000
- Mackenzie Dern: $50,000 (includes $25,000 win bonus) def. Ashley Yoder: $12,000
- Alexander Hernandez: $26,000 (includes $13,000 win bonus) def. Beneil Dariush: $48,000
- John Dodson: $82,000 (includes $41,000 win bonus) def. Pedro Munhoz: $34,000
- C.B. Dollaway: $92,000 (includes $46,000 win bonus) def. Hector Lombard: $62,000
- Zak Ottow: $36,000 (includes $18,000 win bonus) def. Mike Pyle: $55,000
- Cody Stamann: $40,000 (includes $20,000 win bonus) def. Bryan Caraway: $21,000
- Jordan Johnson: $28,000 (includes $14,000 win bonus) def. Adam Milstead: $12,000

== See also ==
- List of UFC events
- 2018 in UFC
- List of current UFC fighters
