= UFC 231 =

UFC mixed martial arts event in 2018

UFC 231: Holloway vs. Ortega
- The poster for UFC 231: Holloway vs. Ortega
- Promotion: Ultimate Fighting Championship
- Date: December 8, 2018
- Venue: Scotiabank Arena
- City: Toronto, Ontario, Canada
- Attendance: 19,039
- Total gate: $2,400,000
- Buyrate: 300,000

Event chronology
UFC Fight Night: dos Santos vs. Tuivasa	UFC 231: Holloway vs. Ortega	UFC on Fox: Lee vs. Iaquinta 2

UFC 231: Holloway vs. Ortega was a mixed martial arts event produced by the Ultimate Fighting Championship held on December 8, 2018 at Scotiabank Arena in Toronto, Ontario, Canada.

== Background ==
A UFC Featherweight Championship bout between Max Holloway and Brian Ortega served as the event headliner. The fight was originally scheduled to take place at UFC 226, but Holloway pulled out due to "concussion like symptoms".

In the co-headlining slot, a bout for the vacant UFC Women's Flyweight Championship between former UFC Women's Bantamweight Championship challenger Valentina Shevchenko and former UFC Women's Strawweight Champion Joanna Jędrzejczyk took place. If victorious, Jędrzejczyk would become the first woman to win titles in different divisions. They met previously in amateur muay thai and kickboxing, with Shevchenko winning all three encounters. On October 2, the UFC announced that Shevchenko would face Sijara Eubanks at UFC 230 instead, as that event was in need of a headliner. The fight between Shevchenko and Jędrzejczyk was put back together a week later though, as a fight between then UFC Heavyweight and Light Heavyweight Champion Daniel Cormier and Derrick Lewis wound up filling the headlining slot at UFC 230.

A lightweight bout between Gilbert Burns and Olivier Aubin-Mercier was previously scheduled to take place in February 2018 at UFC on Fox: Emmett vs. Stephens. However, Burns was pulled from the pairing during the week leading up to the event after medical officials deemed that it was unsafe for Burns to cut the necessary weight for the 156-pound limit. The fight has been rescheduled for this event.

A middleweight bout between The Ultimate Fighter: Brazil 3 heavyweight winner Antônio Carlos Júnior and The Ultimate Fighter: Nations middleweight winner Elias Theodorou was initially scheduled to take place at UFC Fight Night: Santos vs. Anders. However, Júnior pulled out on August 28 due to injury. The pairing was then rescheduled for this event. In turn, on September 13, it was reported that Júnior was forced to withdraw as a surgery is required to treat the injury that caused the first cancellation of this bout. On October 1, it was reported that Eryk Anders would replace him.

A light heavyweight bout between Jimi Manuwa and Thiago Santos was expected to headline UFC Fight Night: Santos vs. Anders, but the bout was scrapped due to an injury suffered by Manuwa. The pairing took place at this event.

A featherweight bout between Renato Moicano and Mirsad Bektić was expected to take place at the event. However, Bektić was forced out of the bout due to an undisclosed injury on November 15. Moicano instead served as the backup fighter for the main event.

John Makdessi was expected to face Carlos Diego Ferreira at the event. However, Makdessi pulled out of the fight on November 28 and was replaced by returning veteran Jesse Ronson. However, on December 4, it was announced that Ronson was pulled from the bout after Ontario Athletics Commission officials deemed that he was too heavy to safely make the lightweight 156-pound limit. He was replaced by newcomer Kyle Nelson.

== Results ==
Main Card
Weight class				Method	Round	Time	Notes
Featherweight	Max Holloway (c)	def.	Brian Ortega	TKO (doctor stoppage)	4	5:00	(Note: For the UFC Featherweight Championship.)
Women's Flyweight	Valentina Shevchenko	def.	Joanna Jędrzejczyk	Decision (unanimous) (49–46, 49–46, 49–46)	5	5:00	(Note: For the vacant UFC Women's Flyweight Championship.)
Welterweight	Gunnar Nelson	def.	Alex Oliveira	Submission (rear-naked choke)	2	4:17
Featherweight	Hakeem Dawodu	def.	Kyle Bochniak	Decision (split) (28–29, 30–27, 30–27)	3	5:00
Light Heavyweight	Thiago Santos	def.	Jimi Manuwa	KO (punch)	2	0:41
Preliminary Card (Fox Sports 1)
Women's Strawweight	Nina Ansaroff	def.	Cláudia Gadelha	Decision (unanimous) (29–28, 29–28, 29–28)	3	5:00
Lightweight	Gilbert Burns	def.	Olivier Aubin-Mercier	Decision (unanimous) (30–27, 30–27, 29–28)	3	5:00
Women's Flyweight	Jessica Eye	def.	Katlyn Chookagian	Decision (split) (29–28, 28–29, 29–28)	3	5:00
Middleweight	Elias Theodorou	def.	Eryk Anders	Decision (split) (29–28, 28–29, 29–28)	3	5:00
Early Preliminary Card (UFC Fight Pass)
Bantamweight	Brad Katona	def.	Matthew Lopez	Decision (unanimous) (30–27, 29–28, 29–28)	3	5:00
Welterweight	Dhiego Lima	def.	Chad Laprise	KO (punch)	1	1:37
Lightweight	Carlos Diego Ferreira	def.	Kyle Nelson	TKO (punches)	2	1:23
Light Heavyweight	Aleksandar Rakić	def.	Devin Clark	TKO (punches)	1	4:05

== Bonus awards ==
The following fighters were awarded $50,000 bonuses:

- Fight of the Night: Max Holloway vs. Brian Ortega
- Performance of the Night: Max Holloway and Thiago Santos

== See also ==
- List of UFC events
- 2018 in UFC
- List of current UFC fighters
