= UFC 227 =

UFC mixed martial arts event in 2018

UFC 227: Dillashaw vs. Garbrandt 2
- The poster for UFC 227: Dillashaw vs. Garbrandt 2
- Promotion: Ultimate Fighting Championship
- Date: August 4, 2018
- Venue: Staples Center
- City: Los Angeles, California
- Attendance: 17,794
- Total gate: $2,850,000
- Buyrate: 300,000

Event chronology
UFC on Fox: Alvarez vs. Poirier 2	UFC 227: Dillashaw vs. Garbrandt 2	UFC Fight Night: Gaethje vs. Vick

UFC 227: Dillashaw vs. Garbrandt 2 was a mixed martial arts event that was produced by the Ultimate Fighting Championship and held on August 4, 2018, at the Staples Center in Los Angeles, California.

== Background ==
A UFC Bantamweight Championship rematch between current two-time champion T.J. Dillashaw and former champion Cody Garbrandt headlined the event. They both coached on The Ultimate Fighter: Redemption before the two previously met at UFC 217 in the co-main event. When they fought, Dillashaw won with a second-round knockout to reclaim the title.

A UFC Flyweight Championship rematch between current champion Demetrious Johnson and 2008 Olympic gold medalist in freestyle wrestling Henry Cejudo also co-headlined the event. The pairing previously met at UFC 197, where Johnson defeated Cejudo by first-round TKO to defend his title.

Derek Brunson was expected to face The Ultimate Fighter: Brazil 3 heavyweight winner Antônio Carlos Júnior at the event. However, Brunson pulled out of the fight in early July citing an eye injury. In turn, Carlos Júnior was removed from the card entirely and is expected to be rescheduled for a future event.

Bharat Khandare was scheduled to face Wuliji Buren at the event. However, Khandare was removed from the bout on July 18 for undisclosed reasons and was replaced by Marlon Vera.

A light heavyweight bout between former UFC Light Heavyweight Championship challengers Volkan Oezdemir and Alexander Gustafsson was expected to take place at this event. However, on July 19, it was announced that Oezdemir pulled out due to a broken nose. In turn, Gustafsson pulled out on July 22 due to a minor injury. A middleweight bout between Thiago Santos and UFC newcomer Kevin Holland was created to fill the vacant spot on the main card.

Benito Lopez was expected to face Ricky Simón at the event. However, Lopez pulled out of the bout on July 24 due to an undisclosed injury and was replaced by promotional newcomer Montel Jackson.

On August 1, a bantamweight bout between former UFC Women's Bantamweight Championship challenger Bethe Correia and Irene Aldana was pulled from this event due to an injury suffered by Correia.

== Results ==
Main Card
Weight class				Method	Round	Time	Notes
Bantamweight	T.J. Dillashaw (c)	def.	Cody Garbrandt	KO (knee and punches)	1	4:10	(Note: For the UFC Bantamweight Championship.)
Flyweight	Henry Cejudo	def.	Demetrious Johnson (c)	Decision (split) (48–47, 47–48, 48–47)	5	5:00	(Note: For the UFC Flyweight Championship.)
Featherweight	Renato Moicano	def.	Cub Swanson	Submission (rear-naked choke)	1	4:15
Women's Strawweight	JJ Aldrich	def.	Polyana Viana	Decision (unanimous) (29–28, 29–28, 29–27)	3	5:00
Middleweight	Thiago Santos	def.	Kevin Holland	Decision (unanimous) (29–27, 29–27, 29–26)	3	5:00
Preliminary Card (FX)
Bantamweight	Pedro Munhoz	def.	Brett Johns	Decision (unanimous) (30–26, 29–28, 29–27)	3	5:00
Bantamweight	Ricky Simón	def.	Montel Jackson	Decision (unanimous) (30–27, 30–27, 29–28)	3	5:00
Bantamweight	Ricardo Ramos	def.	Kang Kyung-ho	Decision (split) (29–28, 28–29, 29–28)	3	5:00
Featherweight	Sheymon Moraes	def.	Matt Sayles	Decision (unanimous) (29–28, 29–28, 29–28)	3	5:00
Early Preliminary Card (UFC Fight Pass)
Flyweight	Alex Perez	def.	Jose Torres	KO (punches)	1	3:36
Women's Strawweight	Zhang Weili	def.	Danielle Taylor	Decision (unanimous) (29–28, 29–28, 29–28)	3	5:00
Bantamweight	Marlon Vera	def.	Wuliji Buren	KO (punch to the body)	2	4:53

== Bonus awards ==
The following fights received $50,000 bonuses:

- Fight of the Night: Henry Cejudo vs. Demetrious Johnson
- Performance of the Night: T.J. Dillashaw and Renato Moicano

== Reported payout ==
The following is the reported payout to the fighters as reported to the California State Athletic Commission. It does not include sponsor money and also does not include the UFC's traditional "fight night" bonuses. The total disclosed payout for the event was $866,000.

- T.J. Dillashaw: $350,000 (no win bonus) def. Cody Garbrandt: $200,000
- Henry Cejudo: $100,000 (no win bonus) def. Demetrious Johnson: $380,000
- Renato Moicano: $52,000 (includes $26,000 win bonus) def. Cub Swanson: $90,000
- J.J. Aldrich: $36,000 (includes $18,000 win bonus) def. Polyana Viana: $12,000
- Thiago Santos: $96,000 (includes $48,000 win bonus) def. Kevin Holland: $13,000
- Pedro Munhoz: $84,000 (includes $42,000 win bonus) def. Brett Johns: $22,000
- Ricky Simón: $24,000 (includes $12,000 win bonus) def. Montel Jackson: $10,000
- Ricardo Ramos: $28,000 (includes $14,000 win bonus) def. Kyung Ho Kang: $16,000
- Sheymon Moraes: $20,000 (includes $10,000 win bonus) def. Matt Sayles: $10,000
- Alex Perez: $28,000 (includes $14,000 win bonus) def. Jose Torres: $14,000
- Zhang Weili: $28,000 (includes $14,000 win bonus) def. Danielle Taylor: $20,000
- Marlon Vera: $64,000 (includes $32,000 win bonus) def. Wuliji Buren: $10,000

== See also ==
- List of UFC events
- 2018 in UFC
- List of current UFC fighters
