= UFC on Fox: Poirier vs. Gaethje =

UFC mixed martial arts event in 2018

- The poster for UFC on Fox: Poirier vs. Gaethje
- Promotion: Ultimate Fighting Championship
- Date: April 14, 2018
- Venue: Gila River Arena
- City: Glendale, Arizona
- Attendance: 11,382
- Total gate: $1,085,712.25

Event chronology
UFC 223: Khabib vs. Iaquinta	UFC on Fox: Poirier vs. Gaethje	UFC Fight Night: Barboza vs. Lee

UFC on Fox: Poirier vs. Gaethje (also known as UFC on FOX 29) was a mixed martial arts event produced by the Ultimate Fighting Championship that was held on April 14, 2018, at the Gila River Arena in Glendale, Arizona.

== Background ==
After previously contesting two events at the nearby Talking Stick Resort Arena in Phoenix, the event was the first that the promotion held in Glendale. Zuffa had previously hosted the final World Extreme Cagefighting event, WEC 53 at the arena in December 2010.

The event was headlined by a lightweight bout between Dustin Poirier and former WSOF Lightweight Champion Justin Gaethje.

A lightweight bout between Gilbert Burns and Lando Vannata was linked to the event. However, the pairing never materialized as Vannata was unable to accept the fight for this date as he was still rehabilitating a recent arm injury.

Abdul Razak Alhassan was scheduled to face Muslim Salikhov at the event. However, Alhassan was removed from the event, citing injury and was replaced by promotional newcomer Ricky Rainey.

A welterweight bout between former WEC Welterweight Champion and interim UFC Welterweight Champion Carlos Condit and Matt Brown was supposed to take place as the co-headliner. However, on April 2, Brown pulled out of the fight due to a torn anterior cruciate ligament and was replaced by Alex Oliveira.

== Results ==
Main Card (Fox)
Weight class				Method	Round	Time	Notes
Lightweight	Dustin Poirier	def.	Justin Gaethje	TKO (punches)	4	0:33	(Note: Gaethje was deducted one point in round 3 due to a repeated eye poke.)
Welterweight	Alex Oliveira	def.	Carlos Condit	Submission (guillotine choke)	2	3:17
Middleweight	Israel Adesanya	def.	Marvin Vettori	Decision (split) (29–28, 28–29, 29–28)	3	5:00
Women's Strawweight	Michelle Waterson	def.	Cortney Casey	Decision (split) (29–28, 28–29, 29–28)	3	5:00
Preliminary Card (Fox)
Middleweight	Antônio Carlos Júnior	def.	Tim Boetsch	Submission (rear-naked choke)	1	4:28
Welterweight	Muslim Salikhov	def.	Ricky Rainey	KO (punches)	2	4:12
Flyweight	John Moraga	def.	Wilson Reis	Decision (unanimous) (29–28, 29–28, 29–28)	3	5:00
Middleweight	Brad Tavares	def.	Krzysztof Jotko	TKO (punches)	3	2:16
Preliminary Card (UFC Fight Pass)
Lightweight	Gilbert Burns	def.	Dan Moret	KO (punches)	2	0:59
Women's Flyweight	Lauren Mueller	def.	Shana Dobson	Decision (unanimous) (29–28, 29–28, 29–28)	3	5:00
Welterweight	Yushin Okami	def.	Dhiego Lima	Decision (unanimous) (30–26, 30–26, 30–26)	3	5:00
Heavyweight	Adam Wieczorek	def.	Arjan Bhullar	Submission (omoplata)	2	1:59
Bantamweight	Alejandro Pérez	def.	Matthew Lopez	TKO (knees and punches)	2	3:42
Bantamweight	Luke Sanders	def.	Patrick Williams	Decision (unanimous) (30–27, 30–27, 29–28)	3	5:00

== Bonus awards ==
The following fighters were awarded $50,000 bonuses:

- Fight of the Night: Dustin Poirier vs. Justin Gaethje
- Performance of the Night: Alex Oliveira and Adam Wieczorek

== Reported payout ==
The following is the reported payout to the fighters as reported to the Arizona Boxing and MMA Commission. It does not include sponsor money and also does not include the UFC's traditional "fight night" bonuses. The total disclosed payout for the event was $1,481,000.

- Dustin Poirier: $170,000 (includes $85,000 win bonus) def. Justin Gaethje: $110,000
- Alex Oliveira: $100,000 (includes $50,000 win bonus) def. Carlos Condit: $115,000
- Israel Adesanya: $106,000 (includes $53,000 win bonus) def. Marvin Vettori: $20,000
- Michelle Waterson: $80,000 (includes $40,000 win bonus) def. Cortney Casey: $33,000
- Antônio Carlos Júnior: $80,000 (includes $40,000 win bonus) def. Tim Boetsch: $72,000
- Muslim Salikhov: $20,000 (includes $10,000 win bonus) def. Rickey Rainey: $12,000
- John Moraga: $74,000 (includes $37,000 win bonus) def. Wilson Reis: $31,000
- Brad Tavares: $80,000 (includes $40,000 win bonus) def. Krzysztof Jotko : $36,000
- Gilbert Burns: $56,000 (includes $28,000 win bonus) def. Dan Moret: $12,000
- Lauren Mueller: $20,000 (includes $10,000 win bonus) def. Shana Dobson: $12,000
- Yushin Okami: $70,000 (includes $35,000 win bonus) def. Dhiego Lima: $15,000
- Adam Wieczorek: $24,000 (includes $12,000 win bonus) def. Arjan Bhullar: $12,000
- Alejandro Pérez: $50,000 (includes $25,000 win bonus) def. Matthew Lopez: $33,000
- Luke Sanders: $24,000 (includes $12,000 win bonus) def. Patrick Williams: $12,000

== See also ==
- List of UFC events
- List of current UFC fighters
- 2018 in UFC
