= Roberto Sanchez (fighter) =

American MMA fighter

- Born: March 5, 1986 (age 40)
- Other names: Little Fury
- Nationality: American
- Height: 5 ft 6 in (168 cm)
- Weight: 56 kg (123 lb; 8 st 11 lb)
- Division: Flyweight (2015 — present)
- Reach: 66 in (168 cm)
- Style: BJJ
- Team: Gracie Barra Texas Etre Fit

Mixed martial arts record
- Total: 10
- Wins: 8
- By submission: 7
- By decision: 1
- Losses: 2
- By submission: 1
- By decision: 1

Other information
- Mixed martial arts record from Sherdog

Roberto Sanchez (born May 5, 1986) is an American mixed martial artist who competed in the Flyweight division of the Ultimate Fighting Championship (UFC). He is a former LFA Flyweight Champion.

== Background ==
Sanchez was born in the city of Houston, Texas. His first combat sport experience started with BJJ at the age of eighteen, serving as a training partner for his brother to test out the new moves which his brother had learned, when he was eighteen years old. After graduating with a Bachelor of Science of Mathematics in 2012, Sanchez took up a job as a Mathematics teacher in high school. He later took a hiatus from long hours teaching career to concentrate on training and competing in MMA. Today, he works full-time as an actuarial analyst for an insurance company and competes MMA professionally.

== Mixed martial arts career ==
=== Early career ===
Sanchez made his professional debut in 2015. He was featured in the debut episode of Dana White's Looking For A Fight web series Session 1, Episode 5. After amassed a record of 8-0, he was signed by UFC.

=== Ultimate Fighting Championship ===
Sanchez made his promotional debut on August 5, 2017 at UFC Fight Night: Pettis vs. Moreno, facing Joseph Morales. He lost the fight via a rear-naked choke in round one.

His next fight came February 18, 2018 against Joby Sanchez at UFC Fight Night: Cowboy vs. Medeiros. He won the fight via submission in round one.

On September 8, 2018, Sanchez faced Ryan Benoit at UFC 228. However, it was reported that Benoit pulled out from the event for undisclosed reasons and was replaced by Jarred Brooks. He lost the fight via split decision.

On November 8, 2018, it was reported that Sanchez was released from the UFC.

== Personal life ==
Sanchez works a full-time job as an actuarial analyst and he worked as a high school mathematics teach and special education teach prior starting competing MMA professionally.

== Mixed martial arts record ==
Professional record breakdown
10 matches	8 wins	2 losses
By submission	7	1
By decision	1	1

Res.	Record	Opponent	Method	Event	Date	Round	Time	Location	Notes
Loss	8–2	Jarred Brooks	Decision (split)	UFC 228	September 8, 2018	3	5:00	Dallas, Texas, United States	
Win	8–1	Joby Sanchez	Submission (rear-naked choke)	UFC Fight Night: Cowboy vs. Medeiros	February 18, 2018	1	1:50	Austin, Texas, United States	
Loss	7–1	Joseph Morales	Submission (rear-naked choke)	UFC Fight Night: Pettis vs. Moreno	August 5, 2017	1	3:56	Mexico City, Mexico	
Win	7–0	Jerome Rivera	Submission (armbar)	LFA 14	June 23, 2017	3	3:41	Houston, Texas, United States	Won the inaugural LFA Flyweight Championship.
Win	6–0	Klayton Mai	Submission (rear-naked choke)	LFA 7	March 24, 2017	2	2:08	Houston, Texas, United States	
Win	5–0	David Waters	Submission (rear-naked choke)	Legacy Fighting Championship 55	May 13, 2016	1	3:19	Houston, Texas, United States	
Win	4–0	David Acosta	Submission (rear-naked choke)	Legacy Fighting Championship 50	January 22, 2016	3	4:25	Houston, Texas, United States	
Win	3–0	Mike DeLeon	Submission (rear-naked choke)	Legacy Fighting Championship 44	August 26, 2015	1	N/A	Houston, Texas, United States	
Win	2–0	Trent Meaux	Submission (armbar)	Legacy Fighting Championship 42	June 15, 2015	1	1:40	Lake Charles, Louisiana, United States	
Win	1–0	Jacob Silva	Decision (unanimous)	Legacy Fighting Championship 39	February 27, 2015	3	5:00	Houston, Texas, United States	

== See also ==
- List of male mixed martial artists
