= UFC 230 =

UFC mixed martial arts event in 2018

UFC 230: Cormier vs. Lewis
- The poster for UFC 230: Cormier vs. Lewis
- Promotion: Ultimate Fighting Championship
- Date: November 3, 2018
- Venue: Madison Square Garden
- City: New York City, New York
- Attendance: 17,011
- Total gate: $2,841,718
- Buyrate: 250,000

Event chronology
UFC Fight Night: Volkan vs. Smith	UFC 230: Cormier vs. Lewis	UFC Fight Night: The Korean Zombie vs. Rodríguez

UFC 230: Cormier vs. Lewis was a mixed martial arts event produced by the Ultimate Fighting Championship that was held on November 3, 2018 at Madison Square Garden in New York City, New York.

== Background ==
A UFC Heavyweight Championship bout between champion Daniel Cormier (also the UFC Light Heavyweight Champion) and Derrick Lewis headlined the event.

A bout for the vacant UFC Women's Flyweight Championship between former UFC Women's Bantamweight Championship challenger Valentina Shevchenko and Sijara Eubanks was expected to serve as the event headliner. Shevchenko was initially expected to face former UFC Women's Strawweight Champion Joanna Jędrzejczyk at UFC 231 for the title, but due to UFC 230 being in need of a main event, she was booked against Eubanks sooner. Eubanks was expected to face Jessica Eye at UFC 232, before being moved to this bout. After the UFC announced Cormier/Lewis on October 9, they confirmed this bout was canceled and that Shevchenko would return to her original bout at UFC 231. Eubanks remained on the card and faced former title challenger Roxanne Modafferi.

A middleweight bout between former interim UFC Middleweight Championship challenger (as well as 2000 Olympic silver medalist and world champion in freestyle wrestling) Yoel Romero and Paulo Costa was scheduled for the event. However, Romero indicated in mid-August that while he has been cleared to fight, his doctors have recommended that he wait another four to five months (early 2019) to allow facial injuries incurred during his most recent fight to fully heal.

A lightweight bout between Dustin Poirier and former UFC Lightweight Championship challenger and The Ultimate Fighter 5 lightweight winner Nate Diaz was expected to take place at the event. However, on October 10, it was reported that Poirier pulled out due to injury and the bout was cancelled.

A bantamweight bout between Brian Kelleher and Domingo Pilarte was expected to take place at the event. However, on October 10, it was reported that Pilarte pulled out due to injury and was replaced by Montel Jackson.

Sultan Aliev was expected to face former Bellator Welterweight Champion Lyman Good at the event, but he pulled out due to injury. He was replaced by Ben Saunders.

A middleweight bout between former UFC Middleweight Champions Luke Rockhold (also former Strikeforce Middleweight Champion) and Chris Weidman was expected to take place at the event. The two previously met at UFC 194 where Rockhold defeated then champion Weidman with a fourth-round knockout. However, Rockhold pulled out on October 19 due to multiple injuries. He was replaced by another former Strikeforce champion Ronaldo Souza, who was initially scheduled to face former WSOF Middleweight and Light Heavyweight Champion David Branch in the event. Branch instead faced Jared Cannonier.

Ruslan Magomedov was expected to face Marcos Rogério de Lima at the event. However, on October 24, it was reported that he pulled out of the event due to visa issues and was replaced by Adam Wieczorek.

At the weigh-ins, Eubanks and Kelleher both missed the required weight for their respective fights. Eubanks weighed in at 127.2 pounds, 1.2 pound over the flyweight non-title fight limit of 126. Meanwhile, Kelleher weighed in at 137 pounds, 1 pound over the bantamweight non-title fight limit of 136. Both of them were fined 20 percent of their purse, which went to their opponents Roxanne Modafferi and Montel Jackson. In turn, Kelleher was pulled due to illness on the day of the event.

== Results ==
Main Card
Weight class				Method	Round	Time	Notes
Heavyweight	Daniel Cormier (c)	def.	Derrick Lewis	Submission (rear-naked choke)	2	2:14	(Note: For the UFC Heavyweight Championship.)
Middleweight	Ronaldo Souza	def.	Chris Weidman	KO (punches)	3	2:46
Middleweight	Jared Cannonier	def.	David Branch	TKO (punches)	2	0:39
Middleweight	Karl Roberson	def.	Jack Marshman	Decision (unanimous) (30–26, 30–26, 30–27)	3	5:00
Middleweight	Israel Adesanya	def.	Derek Brunson	TKO (knees and punches)	1	4:51
Preliminary Card (Fox Sports 1)
Featherweight	Jordan Rinaldi	def.	Jason Knight	Decision (unanimous) (30–27, 30–25, 30–26)	3	5:00
Catchweight (127.2 lb)	Sijara Eubanks	def.	Roxanne Modafferi	Decision (unanimous) (30–27, 30–27, 30–27)	3	5:00
Featherweight	Sheymon Moraes	def.	Julio Arce	Decision (split) (28–29, 29–28, 30–26)	3	5:00
Welterweight	Lyman Good	def.	Ben Saunders	KO (punches)	1	1:32
Early Preliminary Card (UFC Fight Pass)
Lightweight	Matt Frevola	vs.	Lando Vannata	Draw (majority) (29–28, 28–28, 28–28)	3	5:00
Featherweight	Shane Burgos	def.	Kurt Holobaugh	Submission (armbar)	1	2:11
Heavyweight	Marcos Rogério de Lima	def.	Adam Wieczorek	Decision (unanimous) (30–27, 30–27, 30–27)	3	5:00

== Bonus awards ==
The following fighters were awarded $50,000 bonuses:

- Fight of the Night: Ronaldo Souza vs. Chris Weidman
- Performance of the Night: Jared Cannonier and Israel Adesanya

== See also ==
- List of UFC events
- 2018 in UFC
- List of current UFC fighters
- Mixed martial arts in New York
