= Adam Wieczorek =

Polish mixed martial arts fighter

- Born: February 5, 1992 (age 34); Chorzów, Poland
- Other names: Siwy
- Nationality: Polish
- Height: 6 ft 5 in (1.96 m)
- Weight: 232 lb (105 kg; 16 st 8 lb)
- Division: Heavyweight
- Reach: 81.0 in (206 cm)
- Style: Wrestling, BJJ
- Fighting out of: Chorzów, Poland
- Team: Spartan Chorzów
- Years active: 2011–present

Mixed martial arts record
- Total: 14
- Wins: 11
- By knockout: 4
- By submission: 6
- By decision: 1
- Losses: 3
- By knockout: 1
- By decision: 2

Other information
- Mixed martial arts record from Sherdog

Adam Wieczorek (born February 5, 1992) is a Polish mixed martial artist who competes in the Heavyweight division. He formerly competed in the Ultimate Fighting Championship.

== Mixed martial arts career ==
=== Early career ===
Pessoa fought mostly in Poland for PLMMA promotion, amassing an 8–1 record while also winning the PLMMA Heavyweight Championship.

=== Ultimate Fighting Championship ===
In his UFC debut, Wieczorek was expected to face Dmitrii Smolyakov on October 21, 2017, at UFC Fight Night: Cerrone vs. Till, however Dmitrii had to pull out and was replaced by UFC veteran Anthony Hamilton. However, the bout was scratched a day before the event due to "safety concerns," as a few Lechia Gdańsk ultras – extreme and sometimes violent supporters of the local football team – showed up just prior to the weigh-ins. Wieczorek is a supporter of Ruch Chorzów, a Lechia Gdańsk rival team. The fighters were absent from ceremonial weigh-ins due to that reason, but the bout was eventually canceled and rescheduled for UFC Fight Night: Werdum vs. Tybura a month later. Wieczorek won the bout by unanimous decision.

Wieczorek's next fight was against Arjan Bhullar on April 14, 2018, at UFC on Fox 29. After Bhullar controlled the first round with his wrestling, Wieczorek would eventually catch Bhullar with an omoplata early in the second round, officially winning the fight via submission at 1:59 of round 2.

Wieczorek was a late replacement for Ruslan Magomedov against Marcos Rogério de Lima on November 3, 2018, at UFC 230. He lost the fight via unanimous decision.

On January 29, 2019, Wieczorek, an avowed supporter of Ruch Chorzów soccer team, was arrested by the Polish police among the 10 suspects of group of football hooligans named of "Psycho Fans", associated with the football team Ruch Chorzów's fan movement, during a raid by anti-terrorism forces accused of alleged participation in organized crime, kidnapping, drug trafficking, assault, and robbery.

=== Post UFC ===
Making his first appearance after being released from jail, Wieczorek was scheduled to face Szymon Bajor at FEN 37 on November 27, 2021, for the FEN Interim Heavyweight Championship. However, Wieczorek picked up an injury and had to pull out of the bout.

Wieczorek finally made his return to MMA after almost 4 years away, winning against Oli Thompson on September 24, 2022 at MMA Attack 4, finishing him via TKO stoppage in the third round.

In his next bout, Wieczorek moved down to Light Heavyweight for the first time in his career against Marcin Wójcik on August 18, 2023 at FEN 48, however he was knocked out in the second round.

== Championships and accomplishments ==
=== Mixed martial arts ===
- Ultimate Fighting Championship
  - Performance of the Night (One time) vs. Arjan Bhullar
  - UFC.com Awards
    - 2018: Ranked #6 Submission of the Year vs. Arjan Bhullar

== Mixed martial arts record ==
Professional record breakdown
| 14 matches | 11 wins | 3 losses |
| By knockout | 4 | 1 |
| By submission | 6 | 0 |
| By decision | 1 | 2 |

| Res. | Record | Opponent | Method | Event | Date | Round | Time | Location | Notes |
|---|---|---|---|---|---|---|---|---|---|
| Loss | 11–3 | Marcin Wójcik | KO (punch) | FEN 48: Wójcik vs. Wieczorek | August 18, 2023 | 2 | 0:23 | Jastrzębie-Zdrój, Poland | Light Heavyweight debut. |
| Win | 11–2 | Oli Thompson | TKO (punches) | MMA Attack 4 | September 24, 2022 | 3 | 2:13 | Będzin, Poland | |
| Loss | 10–2 | Marcos Rogério de Lima | Decision (unanimous) | UFC 230 | November 3, 2018 | 3 | 5:00 | New York City, New York, United States | |
| Win | 10–1 | Arjan Bhullar | Submission (omoplata) | UFC on Fox: Poirier vs. Gaethje | April 14, 2018 | 2 | 1:59 | Glendale, Arizona, United States | Performance of the Night |
| Win | 9–1 | Anthony Hamilton | Decision (unanimous) | UFC Fight Night: Werdum vs. Tybura | November 19, 2017 | 3 | 5:00 | Sydney, Australia | |
| Win | 8–1 | Ernesto Papa | Submission (rear-naked choke) | Spartan Fight 5 | October 8, 2016 | 1 | N/A | Kraków, Poland | |
| Win | 7–1 | Zoumana Cisse | TKO (punches) | PLMMA 67: Nastula Cup 1 | May 21, 2015 | 1 | 5:06 | Łomianki, Poland | Defended the PLMMA Heavyweight Championship |
| Win | 6–1 | Kevin Wiwatowski | Submission (armbar) | PLMMA 61: AFC 5 | December 5, 2015 | 3 | 3:25 | Bytom, Poland | Won the vacant PLMMA Heavyweight Championship |
| Win | 5–1 | Filip Toe | TKO (punches) | PLMMA 56: Veto | June 19, 2015 | 1 | 3:54 | Bielsko-Biała, Poland | |
| Win | 4–1 | Bartosz Jabłoński | Submission (armbar) | PLMMA 51: Kalisz | March 15, 2015 | 1 | 1:48 | Kalisz, Poland | |
| Win | 3–1 | Andrzej Deberny | Submission (armbar) | Fighters Arena 10 | November 22, 2014 | 1 | 1:40 | Bełchatów, Poland | |
| Win | 2–1 | Ryszard Raszkiewicz | TKO (punches) | MMA Challengers 9 | February 22, 2014 | 2 | 3:53 | Katowice, Poland | |
| Loss | 1–1 | Marcin Tybura | Decision (unanimous) | Polish MMA Championships Finals | November 5, 2011 | 2 | 5:00 | Chorzów, Poland | |
| Win | 1–0 | Adam Bizon | Submission (armbar) | Polish MMA Championships Finals | November 5, 2011 | 1 | 2:23 | Chorzów, Poland | |

== See also ==
- List of current UFC fighters
- List of male mixed martial artists
