= UFC 228 =

UFC mixed martial arts event in 2018

UFC 228: Woodley vs. Till
- The poster for UFC 228: Woodley vs. Till
- Promotion: Ultimate Fighting Championship
- Date: September 8, 2018
- Venue: American Airlines Center
- City: Dallas, Texas
- Attendance: 14,073
- Total gate: $1,700,000
- Buyrate: 130,000

Event chronology
UFC Fight Night: Gaethje vs. Vick	UFC 228: Woodley vs. Till	UFC Fight Night: Hunt vs. Oleinik

UFC 228: Woodley vs. Till was a mixed martial arts event produced by the Ultimate Fighting Championship that was held on September 8, 2018 at American Airlines Center in Dallas, Texas.

== Background ==
The event was headlined by a UFC Welterweight Championship bout between then current champion Tyron Woodley and Darren Till. Due to a nasal issue that required surgery, the interim champion Colby Covington was not available for this event. He was also expected to be stripped of his title as soon as the Woodley/Till bout took place. The Ultimate Fighter: American Top Team vs. Blackzilians welterweight winner Kamaru Usman submitted medicals and weighed in as an official replacement for the bout.

A UFC Women's Flyweight Championship bout between then champion Nicco Montaño and former UFC Women's Bantamweight Championship title challenger Valentina Shevchenko was expected to take place at the event, as the co-headliner. However, before the weigh-ins, Montaño was transported to a hospital due to the effects of weight cutting and the title bout with Shevchenko was cancelled. Later that day, UFC president Dana White announced that Montaño was stripped of the title and that Shevchenko will fight for the vacant belt "as soon as she's able".

A featherweight bout between The Ultimate Fighter: Latin America featherweight winner Yair Rodríguez and Zabit Magomedsharipov was scheduled for the event. However, Rodríguez pulled out of the fight on August 23 citing injury. He was replaced by Brandon Davis.

Ryan Benoit was scheduled to face Roberto Sanchez at the event. However, Benoit pulled out of the fight in late August for undisclosed reasons and was replaced by Jarred Brooks.

== Results ==
Main Card
Weight class				Method	Round	Time	Notes
Welterweight	Tyron Woodley (c)	def.	Darren Till	Submission (brabo choke)	2	4:19	(Note: For the UFC Welterweight Championship.)
Women's Strawweight	Jéssica Andrade	def.	Karolina Kowalkiewicz	KO (punch)	1	1:58
Featherweight	Zabit Magomedsharipov	def.	Brandon Davis	Submission (Suloev Stretch kneebar)	2	3:46
Bantamweight	Jimmie Rivera	def.	John Dodson	Decision (unanimous) (30–27, 30–27, 29–28)	3	5:00
Welterweight	Abdul Razak Alhassan	def.	Niko Price	KO (punch)	1	0:43
Preliminary Card (FX)
Women's Strawweight	Tatiana Suarez	def.	Carla Esparza	TKO (punches and elbows)	3	4:33
Bantamweight	Aljamain Sterling	def.	Cody Stamann	Submission (Suloev Stretch kneebar)	2	3:42
Welterweight	Geoff Neal	def.	Frank Camacho	KO (head kick)	2	1:23
Middleweight	Darren Stewart	def.	Charles Byrd	TKO (elbow and punches)	2	2:17
Preliminary Card (UFC Fight Pass)
Welterweight	Diego Sanchez	def.	Craig White	Decision (unanimous) (30–27, 30–27, 30–27)	3	5:00
Lightweight	Jim Miller	def.	Alex White	Submission (rear-naked choke)	1	1:29
Women's Bantamweight	Irene Aldana	def.	Lucie Pudilová	Decision (split) (29–28, 28–29, 29–28)	3	5:00
Flyweight	Jarred Brooks	def.	Roberto Sanchez	Decision (split) (29–28, 28–29, 29–28)	3	5:00

== Bonus awards ==
The following fighters received $50,000 bonuses:

- Fight of the Night: Irene Aldana vs. Lucie Pudilová
- Performance of the Night: Tyron Woodley and Jéssica Andrade

== See also ==
- 2018 in UFC
- List of UFC events
- List of current UFC fighters
