= Brian Ortega =

American former mixed martial artist (born 1991)

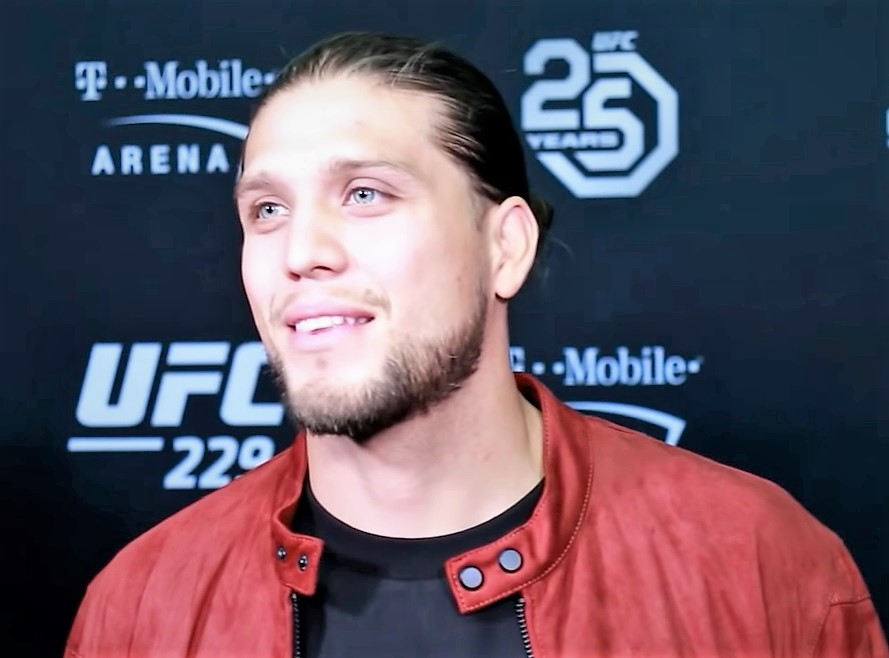
- Ortega in 2018
- Born: Brian Martin Ortega; February 21, 1991 (age 35); Los Angeles, California, U.S.
- Nickname: T-City
- Nationality: American • Mexican
- Height: 5 ft 9 in (175 cm)
- Weight: 153 lb (69 kg; 10 st 13 lb)
- Division: Featherweight; Lightweight
- Reach: 69 in (175 cm)
- Fighting out of: Los Angeles, California, U.S.
- Team: Black Belt Surfing; Black House MMA (formerly); Gracie University HQ (2004–present); Huntington Beach Ultimate Training Center (2019–present)
- Trainer: Rener Gracie
- Rank: 1st degree BJJ black belt (Note: Under Rener Gracie)
- Years active: 2010–2026

Mixed martial arts record
- Total: 23
- Wins: 16
- By knockout: 3
- By submission: 8
- By decision: 5
- Losses: 6
- By knockout: 2
- By decision: 4
- No contests: 1

Other information
- Mixed martial arts record from Sherdog

Brian Martin Ortega (born February 21, 1991) is an American former professional mixed martial artist who competed in the Featherweight and Lightweight divisions of the Ultimate Fighting Championship (UFC). A professional from 2010 until his retirement in 2026, Ortega has also competed in the RFA, where he was the Featherweight Champion.

== Background ==
Ortega was born on February 21, 1991, in Los Angeles, California. Ortega has both American and Mexican citizenships as his parents hailed from Hermosillo, Sonora, Mexico. He grew up in a Section 8 housing project of San Pedro, California.

When Ortega was 13, he began learning Brazilian jiu-jitsu after his father enlisted him at the Gracie Jiu-Jitsu Academy in Torrance, California. Ortega started training under head coach Rener Gracie who saw great potential in him.

== Mixed martial arts career ==
=== Early career ===
When Ortega was 17, he met boxing coach James Luhrsen, who trained him in striking skills to complement the ground work Ortega was learning with Gracie. Ortega began his career competing for regional promotions exclusively in Southern California. He won his first pro-MMA championship against Carlos Garces in a five-round bout via unanimous decision, becoming the Respect in the Cage featherweight champion.

Ortega went on to compile an undefeated record of 8–0 before signing with the UFC in April 2014. He credited his success to support and love from James Luhrsen and Rener Gracie.

=== Ultimate Fighting Championship ===
Ortega was expected to make his promotional debut against Diego Brandão on May 31, 2014, at The Ultimate Fighter Brazil 3 Finale. However, Brandao pulled out of the bout in the days leading up to the event citing an injury. Due to the late nature of the change, officials did not try to find a replacement and Ortega was pulled from the card as well.

Ortega eventually made his debut on July 26, 2014, at UFC on Fox 12 against Mike De La Torre. Originally, a first round submission (rear-naked choke) win for Ortega, the result was changed to "No Contest" after Ortega tested positive for drostanolone during a post fight screening. Subsequently, Ortega was fined $2,500 and suspended for nine months.

Ortega faced Thiago Tavares on June 6, 2015, at UFC Fight Night 68. He won the back-and-forth fight via TKO in the third round. Both participants were awarded Fight of the Night honors.

Ortega faced Diego Brandão, who is a second-degree black belt in Brazilian jiu-jitsu, on January 2, 2016, at UFC 195. After being down against Diego's striking for the first two rounds, Ortega rallied and won via triangle choke in the third round.

At UFC 199 on June 4, 2016, Ortega defeated Clay Guida by KO in the third round. After winning the first round, Guida won the second round and looked to have the third won until Ortega rallied and won via a flying knee near the end of the round.

Ortega was expected to face Hacran Dias on October 1, 2016, at UFC Fight Night 96. However, Ortega pulled out of the fight in early September and was replaced by Andre Fili.

Ortega next faced Renato Moicano on July 29, 2017, at UFC 214. He won the back and forth fight via submission in the third round with a guillotine choke, while both fighters were awarded Fight of the Night bonus.

Ortega faced Cub Swanson on December 9, 2017, at UFC Fight Night 123. He was victorious in the fight, winning in the second round by guillotine choke submission. The finish put Ortega's streak at five straight fights won with a finish, which at the time was the second longest current win streak in the UFC featherweight division behind the champion, Max Holloway. The win also earned him the Fight of the Night and Performance of the Night honors.

Ortega faced Frankie Edgar on March 3, 2018, at UFC 222. He won the fight via knockout in the first round. In doing so, he became the first man to ever finish Edgar in MMA. This win earned him the Performance of the Night bonus.

Ortega was scheduled to face Max Holloway for the UFC Featherweight Championship on July 7, 2018, at UFC 226. However, on July 4, Holloway was pulled from the fight due to "concussion like symptoms". Due to Holloway's withdrawal, the fight would be cancelled and planned to be rescheduled at a later date.

The fight against Max Holloway eventually took place on December 8, 2018, in the main event at UFC 231. Ortega lost the fight by doctor stoppage at the end of the fourth round. This fight earned him the Fight of the Night award.

Ortega was scheduled to face Chan Sung Jung on December 21, 2019, at UFC on ESPN+ 23. However, Ortega pulled out of the fight in early December citing a knee injury. The bout against Jung eventually took place on October 18, 2020 at UFC Fight Night: Ortega vs. The Korean Zombie. Dropping Jung multiple times, Ortega won the one sided match by unanimous decision.

Ortega was scheduled for a UFC Featherweight Championship bout against current UFC Featherweight Champion Alexander Volkanovski on March 27, 2021, at UFC 260. However, the fight was cancelled due to COVID-19 protocols.

On April 2, 2021, it was announced that Alexander Volkanovski and Ortega would be the coaches for The Ultimate Fighter 29 at ESPN+ and the show will feature contestants at bantamweight and middleweight.

Ortega faced Alexander Volkanovski on September 25, 2021, at UFC 266 for the UFC Featherweight Championship. He lost the fight via unanimous decision. This fight earned him the Fight of the Night award.

Ortega faced Yair Rodríguez on July 16, 2022, at UFC on ABC 3. He lost the fight via TKO at the end of the first round after suffering a dislocated shoulder which rendered him unable to continue.

After a year and a half layoff, Ortega returned to rematch against Yair Rodríguez on February 24, 2024, at UFC Fight Night 237. Ortega won the fight via arm-triangle submission in the third round. This fight earned him another Performance of the Night award.

Ortega was scheduled to face Diego Lopes in a Lightweight bout on June 29, 2024, at UFC 303. The bout was originally scheduled for Featherweight, but was changed one day before the event due to weight cutting issues by Ortega. Subsequently, the day of the event, Ortega withdrew from the bout due to an illness and was replaced at the last minute by Dan Ige.

The bout with Diego Lopes was rebooked and eventually took place on September 14, 2024, at UFC 306. He lost the fight by unanimous decision.

Ortega faced former UFC Bantamweight Champion Aljamain Sterling on August 23, 2025 at UFC Fight Night 257. Originally slated as a featherweight bout, the fight was changed to a 153-pound catchweight after reports that Ortega experienced complications during his weight cut. Ortega lost the fight by unanimous decision.

In a move to the lightweight division, Ortega was scheduled to face Renato Moicano in a rematch on March 7, 2026 at UFC 326. However, Ortega withdrew due to injury. The bout was scheduled to take place at UFC 331 on September 19, 2026. However, days before the event, Ortega had to withdraw due to an injury, so Moicano was re-scheduled to compete at another event instead.

Ortega faced Dan Hooker in his UFC debut in the lightweight division on November 21, 2026 at UFC Fight Night 294. He lost the fight by unanimous decision and announced his retirement after the fight stating:

"I started this because I came from nothing and I wanted to be something. And I was fueled by hate, I was fueled by anger. I don't have that anymore. I feel bad that I hit him. I healed. So as of right now, I think that's it. I just want to thank everyone, all the people who supported me."

== Controversies ==
=== UFC 248 incident ===
On March 8, 2020, a police report was filed against Ortega for allegedly slapping rapper Jay Park, translator for Jung Chan-sung (The Korean Zombie), at UFC 248.

== Personal life ==
Ortega and his wife Stephanie have two sons, Caleb and Joshua. Their third son was born in October 2026. He was previously engaged to fellow UFC fighter Tracy Cortez.

== Championships and accomplishments ==
- Ultimate Fighting Championship
  - Fight of the Night (Five times) vs. Thiago Tavares, Renato Moicano, Cub Swanson, Max Holloway and Alexander Volkanovski
  - Performance of the Night (Three times) vs. Cub Swanson, Frankie Edgar and Yair Rodriguez 2
    - Fifth most Post-Fight bonuses in UFC Featherweight division history (8)
  - Tied (Ricardo Lamas & Joanderson Brito) for third most finishes in UFC Featherweight division history (7)
  - Tied (Daniel Pineda, Chas Skelly, Makwan Amirkhani & Youssef Zalal) for second most submissions in UFC Featherweight division history (4)
  - Tied (Dennis Bermudez) for seventh most submission attempts in UFC Featherweight division history (12)
  - UFC Honors Awards
    - 2021: President's Choice Fight of the Year Nominee vs. Alexander Volkanovski
  - UFC.com Awards
    - 2015: Ranked #6 Fight of the Year vs. Thiago Tavares
    - 2016: Ranked #3 Submission of the Year vs. Diego Brandao
    - 2017: Ranked #10 Fighter of the Year & Ranked #4 Submission of the Year vs. Cub Swanson
    - 2018: Ranked #4 Fight of the Year vs. Max Holloway, Best Knockout of the 1HY & Ranked #2 Knockout of the Year vs. Frankie Edgar
    - 2021: Ranked #2 Fight of the Year vs. Alexander Volkanovski
    - 2024: Best Submission of the 1HY & Ranked #5 Submission of the Year vs. Yair Rodriguez 2
- Resurrection Fighting Alliance
  - RFA Featherweight Champion (one time)
- World MMA Awards
  - 2017 Breakthrough Fighter of the Year
- MMA Junkie
  - 2015 June Fight of the Month vs. Thiago Tavares
  - 2017 #3 Ranked Submission of the Year vs. Cub Swanson at UFC Fight Night: Swanson vs. Ortega
  - 2021 September Fight of the Month vs. Alexander Volkanovski
- ESPN
  - 2021 Fight of the Year vs. Alexander Volkanovski
- MMA Mania
  - 2021 Fight of the Year vs. Alexander Volkanovski
- MMA Sucka
  - 2021 Fight of the Year vs. Alexander Volkanovski
- CBS Sports
  - 2018 #4 Ranked UFC Fight of the Year vs. Max Holloway
  - 2021 #2 Ranked UFC Fight of the Year vs. Alexander Volkanovski
- Combat Press
  - 2024 Comeback of the Year vs. Yair Rodríguez 2 at UFC Fight Night: Moreno vs. Royval 2
- Cageside Press
  - 2024 Comeback of the Year vs. Yair Rodríguez at UFC Fight Night: Moreno vs. Royval 2

== Mixed martial arts record ==
Professional record breakdown
23 matches	16 wins	6 losses
By knockout	3	2
By submission	8	0
By decision	5	4
No contests	1	

Res.	Record	Opponent	Method	Event	Date	Round	Time	Location	Notes
Loss	16–6 (1)	Dan Hooker	Decision (unanimous)	UFC Fight Night: Procházka vs. Stirling	November 21, 2026	3	5:00	Al Rayyan, Qatar	Lightweight debut.
Loss	16–5 (1)	Aljamain Sterling	Decision (unanimous)	UFC Fight Night: Walker vs. Zhang	August 23, 2025	5	5:00	Shanghai, China	Catchweight (153 lb) bout.
Loss	16–4 (1)	Diego Lopes	Decision (unanimous)	UFC 306	September 14, 2024	3	5:00	Las Vegas, Nevada, United States	
Win	16–3 (1)	Yair Rodríguez	Submission (arm-triangle choke)	UFC Fight Night: Moreno vs. Royval 2	February 24, 2024	3	0:58	Mexico City, Mexico	Performance of the Night.
Loss	15–3 (1)	Yair Rodríguez	TKO (shoulder injury)	UFC on ABC: Ortega vs. Rodríguez	July 16, 2022	1	4:11	Elmont, New York, United States	
Loss	15–2 (1)	Alexander Volkanovski	Decision (unanimous)	UFC 266	September 25, 2021	5	5:00	Las Vegas, Nevada, United States	For the UFC Featherweight Championship. Fight of the Night.
Win	15–1 (1)	Jung Chan-sung	Decision (unanimous)	UFC Fight Night: Ortega vs. The Korean Zombie	October 18, 2020	5	5:00	Abu Dhabi, United Arab Emirates	
Loss	14–1 (1)	Max Holloway	TKO (doctor stoppage)	UFC 231	December 8, 2018	4	5:00	Toronto, Ontario, Canada	For the UFC Featherweight Championship. Fight of the Night.
Win	14–0 (1)	Frankie Edgar	KO (punch)	UFC 222	March 3, 2018	1	4:44	Las Vegas, Nevada, United States	Performance of the Night.
Win	13–0 (1)	Cub Swanson	Submission (guillotine choke)	UFC Fight Night: Swanson vs. Ortega	December 9, 2017	2	3:22	Fresno, California, United States	Performance of the Night. Fight of the Night.
Win	12–0 (1)	Renato Moicano	Submission (guillotine choke)	UFC 214	July 29, 2017	3	2:59	Anaheim, California, United States	Fight of the Night.
Win	11–0 (1)	Clay Guida	KO (knee)	UFC 199	June 4, 2016	3	4:40	Inglewood, California, United States	
Win	10–0 (1)	Diego Brandão	Submission (triangle choke)	UFC 195	January 2, 2016	3	1:37	Las Vegas, Nevada, United States	
Win	9–0 (1)	Thiago Tavares	TKO (punches)	UFC Fight Night: Boetsch vs. Henderson	June 6, 2015	3	4:10	New Orleans, Louisiana, United States	Fight of the Night.
NC	8–0 (1)	Mike De La Torre	NC (overturned)	UFC on Fox: Lawler vs. Brown	July 26, 2014	1	1:39	San Jose, California, United States	Originally a submission (rear-naked choke) win for Ortega; overturned after he tested positive for drostanolone.
Win	8–0	Keoni Koch	Decision (split)	RFA 12	January 24, 2014	5	5:00	Los Angeles, California, United States	Won the RFA Featherweight Championship.
Win	7–0	Jordan Rinaldi	Submission (triangle choke)	RFA 9	August 6, 2013	3	2:29	Pomona, California, United States	
Win	6–0	Thomas Guimond	Submission (triangle choke)	Respect in the Cage 20	May 4, 2013	1	4:02	Pomona, California, United States	Defended the RTC Featherweight Championship.
Win	5–0	Carlos Garces	Decision (unanimous)	Respect in the Cage 10	March 12, 2011	5	5:00	Pomona, California, United States	Won the RTC Featherweight Championship.
Win	4–0	Chris Mercado	Decision (unanimous)	Respect in the Cage 9	January 15, 2011	3	5:00	Pomona, California, United States	
Win	3–0	Vincent Martinez	Submission (rear-naked choke)	Respect in the Cage 5	July 24, 2010	1	1:54	Los Angeles, California, United States	
Win	2–0	Brady Harrison	Decision (unanimous)	Gladiator Challenge: Bad Behaviour	June 27, 2010	3	5:00	San Jacinto, California, United States	
Win	1–0	John Sassone	Submission (triangle choke)	Gladiator Challenge: Maximum Force	April 25, 2010	1	1:48	San Jacinto, California, United States	

== Pay-per-view bouts ==
No.	Event	Fight	Date	Venue	City	PPV Buys
1.	UFC 231	Holloway vs. Ortega	December 8, 2018	Scotiabank Arena	Toronto, Ontario, Canada	300,000
2.	UFC 266	Volkanovski vs. Ortega	September 25, 2021	T-Mobile Arena	Las Vegas, Nevada, United States	Not Disclosed

== See also ==
- List of male mixed martial artists
