= UFC Fight Night: Cowboy vs. Medeiros =

UFC mixed martial arts event in 2018

- The poster for UFC Fight Night: Cowboy vs. Medeiros
- Promotion: Ultimate Fighting Championship
- Date: February 18, 2018
- Venue: Frank Erwin Center
- City: Austin, Texas
- Attendance: 10,502
- Total gate: $794,350

Event chronology
UFC 221: Rockhold vs. Romero	UFC Fight Night: Cowboy vs. Medeiros	UFC on Fox: Emmett vs. Stephens

UFC Fight Night: Cowboy vs. Medeiros (also known as UFC Fight Night 126) was a mixed martial arts event produced by the Ultimate Fighting Championship that was held on February 18, 2018, at Frank Erwin Center in Austin, Texas, United States.

== Background ==
The event marked the promotion's third visit to Austin, and first since UFC Fight Night: Edgar vs. Swanson in November 2014.

A welterweight bout between former UFC Lightweight Championship challenger Donald Cerrone and Yancy Medeiros served as the event headliner.

Former Invicta FC Bantamweight Champion and UFC Women's Featherweight Championship challenger Tonya Evinger was expected to face Marion Reneau at the event. However, on January 9, it was announced that Evinger was injured and had to pull out of the bout. In turn, Reneau was pulled from the event and rescheduled to face 2004 Olympic silver medalist in wrestling and former UFC Women's Bantamweight Championship challenger Sara McMann a week later at UFC on Fox: Emmett vs. Stephens.

A flyweight bout between former UFC Flyweight Championship challenger Ray Borg and Brandon Moreno was expected to take place at this event. However, due to an injury sustained by Moreno, the pairing was delayed and rescheduled to take place at UFC 223.

Humberto Bandenay was scheduled to face promotional newcomer Steven Peterson at the event. However, Bandenay was removed from the event in early February due to an alleged visa issue and was replaced by Brandon Davis.

Former Invicta FC Strawweight Champion Lívia Renata Souza was expected to make her debut against former WSOF Women's Strawweight Champion Jessica Aguilar at the event. However, Souza pulled out on February 10 due to a hand injury and the bout was scrapped.

== Results ==
Main card (Fox Sports 1)
Weight class				Method	Round	Time	Notes
Welterweight	Donald Cerrone	def.	Yancy Medeiros	TKO (punches)	1	4:58
Heavyweight	Derrick Lewis	def.	Marcin Tybura	KO (punches)	3	2:48
Lightweight	James Vick	def.	Francisco Trinaldo	Decision (unanimous) (29–28, 29–28, 29–28)	3	5:00
Welterweight	Curtis Millender	def.	Thiago Alves	KO (knee)	2	4:17
Featherweight	Brandon Davis	def.	Steven Peterson	Decision (unanimous) (30–27, 29–28, 30–26)	3	5:00
Lightweight	Sage Northcutt	def.	Thibault Gouti	Decision (unanimous) (29–28, 29–28, 29–28)	3	5:00
Preliminary card (Fox Sports 1)
Lightweight	Carlos Diego Ferreira	def.	Jared Gordon	KO (punches)	1	1:58
Welterweight	Geoff Neal	def.	Brian Camozzi	Submission (bulldog choke)	1	2:48
Flyweight	Roberto Sanchez	def.	Joby Sanchez	Submission (rear-naked choke)	1	1:50
Women's Bantamweight	Lucie Pudilová	def.	Sarah Moras	Decision (unanimous) (29–28, 29–28, 29–27)	3	5:00
Preliminary card (UFC Fight Pass)
Welterweight	Alex Morono	def.	Josh Burkman	Submission (guillotine choke)	1	2:12
Middleweight	Oskar Piechota	def.	Tim Williams	TKO (punches)	1	1:54

== Bonus awards ==
The following fighters were awarded $50,000 bonuses:

- Fight of the Night: Brandon Davis vs. Steven Peterson
- Performance of the Night: Derrick Lewis and Curtis Millender

== See also ==
- List of UFC events
- List of current UFC fighters
- 2018 in UFC
