= UFC 223 =

UFC mixed martial arts event in 2018

UFC 223: Khabib vs. Iaquinta
- The poster for UFC 223: Khabib vs. Iaquinta
- Promotion: Ultimate Fighting Championship
- Date: April 7, 2018
- Venue: Barclays Center
- City: Brooklyn, New York
- Attendance: 17,026
- Total gate: $3,007,108
- Buyrate: 350,000

Event chronology
UFC Fight Night: Werdum vs. Volkov	UFC 223: Khabib vs. Iaquinta	UFC on Fox: Poirier vs. Gaethje

UFC 223: Khabib vs. Iaquinta was a mixed martial arts event produced by the Ultimate Fighting Championship that was held on April 7, 2018, at the Barclays Center in Brooklyn, New York.

== Background ==
A UFC Lightweight Championship bout between interim champion and The Ultimate Fighter: Team Lesnar vs. Team dos Santos welterweight winner Tony Ferguson and Khabib Nurmagomedov was originally expected to headline this event. The pairing had previously been scheduled and cancelled for various reasons on three occasions over the previous three years (The Ultimate Fighter: Team McGregor vs. Team Faber Finale, UFC on Fox: Teixeira vs. Evans and UFC 209). Due to the inactivity of former UFC Featherweight Champion and current lightweight champion Conor McGregor, the promotion had indicated that he would be stripped of his title and that the winner of the proposed Ferguson/Nurmagomedov bout would become the undisputed champion. Despite confirming on January 19 that the winner of this bout would become the de facto champion, UFC president Dana White did not confirm if McGregor would be stripped.

For the fourth time in four years, the bout fell apart, as Ferguson pulled out of the fight on April 1 due to a knee injury. He was replaced by then UFC Featherweight Champion Max Holloway. If successful, Holloway would have become only the second fighter to be champion in two divisions simultaneously (after McGregor who won the lightweight title at UFC 205 when he was the reigning featherweight champion) as well as the fifth overall to win titles in different divisions. On weigh-in day, the main event suffered another setback as Holloway was deemed medically unfit to compete and subsequently removed from the card. The UFC targeted former lightweight champion Anthony Pettis as his replacement, after Pettis' bout against Michael Chiesa was scrapped due to an incident caused by McGregor (see section below). Pettis weighed in at 155.2 pounds in his first attempt, and despite being given extra time to make the championship weight limit of 155 pounds, he did not weigh in again.

After Holloway was pulled from the event, Paul Felder also offered to step in to face Nurmagomedov as he weighed in at 155, but the New York State Athletic Commission (NYSAC) declined it due to Felder being unranked in the UFC official rankings. The UFC booked Felder's opponent Al Iaquinta instead. Due to weighing 0.2 lb over the championship weight limit, Iaquinta would not be officially eligible for the title in case he won, but UFC president Dana White expressed that he would be considered champion by the UFC, and treated as such to the extent possible under regulations. The NYSAC later reaffirmed that Iaquinta could not be officially recognized as champion. Both Felder and Pettis were also off the event. The bout between Iaquinta and Felder was originally scheduled for UFC 218. However, Iaquinta pulled out due to an undisclosed injury and the bout was rescheduled for this event.

A UFC Women's Strawweight Championship bout between the current champion Rose Namajunas and former champion Joanna Jędrzejczyk served as the co-headliner for this event. The pairing previously met in November 2017 at UFC 217 with Namajunas winning the title via knockout in the first round.

Mairbek Taisumov was expected to face Evan Dunham at the event. However, Taisumov withdrew from the fight on March 9 over visa delays. Dunham faced Olivier Aubin-Mercier at the event.

=== Conor McGregor and team assault on bus ===
On April 5, following the event's media day, Conor McGregor and his crew attacked a bus containing several fighters scheduled to compete at the event, just as it was leaving the arena following a press conference. Nurmagomedov and two teammates were inside that bus. The attack included objects being thrown through a window, which then shattered. As a result of this act, the event suffered several changes:

- Artem Lobov was expected to face Alex Caceres, but the bout was scrapped after Lobov was removed from the event due to his direct involvement in the incident.
- The Ultimate Fighter: Live lightweight winner Michael Chiesa was expected to face former WEC and UFC Lightweight Champion Anthony Pettis, but was pulled from the bout due to multiple cuts from a broken window.
- A flyweight bout between former UFC Flyweight Championship challenger Ray Borg and Brandon Moreno was expected to take place seven weeks earlier at UFC Fight Night: Cowboy vs. Medeiros. However, due to a minor injury sustained by Moreno, the pairing was delayed and rescheduled to take place at this event. This bout was also scrapped, after Borg had issues related to glass shards in his eye.

McGregor eventually turned himself in to the NYPD and was held in custody as charges were filed. He was later arrested alongside SBG teammate Cian Cowley and charged with three counts of assault and one count of criminal mischief. They were released with a bail of $50,000 and $25,000, respectively. The charges were dropped in late July after McGregor pleaded no contest to a count of disorderly conduct for his role in the melee and performed five days of community service.

== Results ==
Main Card
Weight class				Method	Round	Time	Notes
Lightweight	Khabib Nurmagomedov	def.	Al Iaquinta	Decision (unanimous) (50–44, 50–43, 50–43)	5	5:00	(Note: For the vacant UFC Lightweight Championship (only Nurmagomedov was eligible).)
Women's Strawweight	Rose Namajunas (c)	def.	Joanna Jędrzejczyk	Decision (unanimous) (49–46, 49–46, 49–46)	5	5:00	(Note: For the UFC Women's Strawweight Championship.)
Featherweight	Renato Moicano	def.	Calvin Kattar	Decision (unanimous) (29–28, 30–27, 30–27)	3	5:00
Featherweight	Zabit Magomedsharipov	def.	Kyle Bochniak	Decision (unanimous) (29–28, 30–27, 30–27)	3	5:00
Lightweight	Chris Gruetzemacher	def.	Joe Lauzon	TKO (corner stoppage)	2	5:00
Preliminary Card (Fox Sports 1)
Women's Strawweight	Karolina Kowalkiewicz	def.	Felice Herrig	Decision (split) (29–28, 28–29, 29–28)	3	5:00
Lightweight	Olivier Aubin-Mercier	def.	Evan Dunham	TKO (knees to the body and punches)	1	0:53
Women's Flyweight	Ashlee Evans-Smith	def.	Bec Rawlings	Decision (unanimous) (30–27, 30–27, 30–27)	3	5:00
Light Heavyweight	Devin Clark	def.	Mike Rodríguez	Decision (unanimous) (29–28, 30–27, 30–27)	3	5:00

== Bonus awards ==
The following fighters were awarded $50,000 bonuses:

- Fight of the Night: Zabit Magomedsharipov vs. Kyle Bochniak
- Performance of the Night: Chris Gruetzemacher and Olivier Aubin-Mercier

== See also ==
- List of UFC events
- 2018 in UFC
- List of current UFC fighters
