= Paulo Costa =

Brazilian mixed martial artist (born 1991)

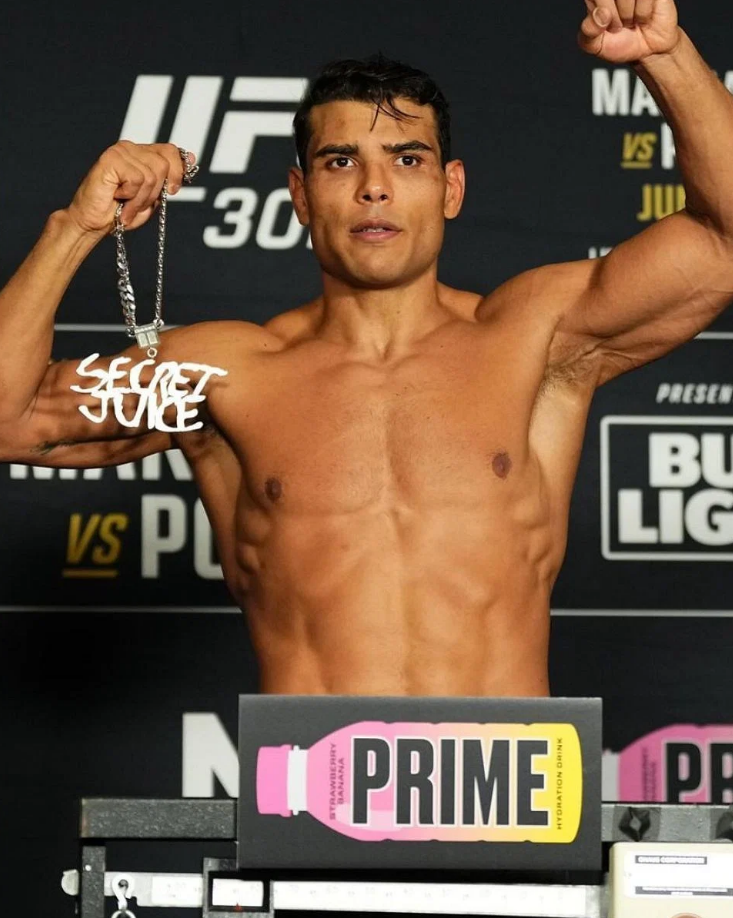
- Costa in 2024
- Born: Paulo Henrique Costa; 21 April 1991 (age 35); Belo Horizonte, Minas Gerais, Brazil
- Other names: Borrachinha
- Height: 6 ft 0 in (183 cm)
- Weight: 205 lb (93 kg; 14 st 9 lb)
- Division: Middleweight (2012–2025); Light heavyweight (2021, 2026-present)
- Reach: 72 in (183 cm)
- Fighting out of: Belo Horizonte, Minas Gerais, Brazil
- Team: Team Nogueira Champion Team; Clube Atlético Mineiro; Fight Ready (2017–present)
- Trainer: Eric Albarracin
- Rank: Black belt in Brazilian Jiu-Jitsu
- Years active: 2012–present

Mixed martial arts record
- Total: 20
- Wins: 16
- By knockout: 12
- By submission: 1
- By decision: 3
- Losses: 4
- By knockout: 1
- By decision: 3

Other information
- Mixed martial arts record from Sherdog

Paulo Henrique Costa (born 21 April 1991) is a Brazilian professional mixed martial artist. He currently competes in the Light Heavyweight division of the Ultimate Fighting Championship (UFC). As of 24 October 2026, he is #5 in the Meta UFC light heavyweight rankings.

== Background ==
Costa, the son of odd-jobber Carlos Roberto and Maria Augusta, was born in 1991. He has an older brother, Carlos Costa, who is a former mixed martial artist and one of Paulo's coaches. Paulo grew up in Contagem playing football and eventually picked up Muay Thai at the age of nine in order to learn discipline and avoid street fights he was constantly getting into. As a teenager, Paulo joined a jiu-jitsu gym with his brother only to quit the sport after their father died of throat cancer when Paulo was 17. A couple of years later, Costa returned to jiu-jitsu and started competing under the tutelage of his brother who was already a purple belt at the time.

In order to help his mother with bills, Costa worked in real estate and as an IT teacher, teaching Microsoft Word and Microsoft Excel.

== Mixed martial arts career ==
=== Early career ===
Costa made his professional MMA debut in his native country of Brazil in February 2012. Eventually, his brother convinced their mother to support Paulo monetarily for a year in order to pursue his professional martial arts career. Over the next five years, he amassed a record of 8–0 with 7 knockouts and 1 submission.

=== The Ultimate Fighter: Brazil ===
Costa was chosen to be a fighter on The Ultimate Fighter: Brazil 3. In the opening elimination round, he defeated José Roberto via submission (guillotine choke) in the second round. Costa was the second middleweight fighter chosen by coach Wanderlei Silva. His next fight was against Márcio Alexandre Jr., and Costa lost via split decision after three rounds.

=== Ultimate Fighting Championship ===
Costa made his promotional debut on 11 March 2017, at UFC Fight Night 106 against Garreth McLellan. He won the fight via TKO in the first round, earning his first Performance of the Night award.

Costa faced Oluwale Bamgbose on 3 June 2017, at UFC 212. He won the fight via TKO in the second round.

After the fight with Bamgbose, UFC offered a new contract, but the parties did not come to an agreement on the financial terms. The UFC then proposed a fight with former welterweight champion Johny Hendricks, with a promise to renegotiate after the bout. Costa faced Hendricks on 4 November 2017, at UFC 217. He won the fight via TKO in the second round. After the bout Costa signed a new, multi-fight contract.

Costa was expected to face Uriah Hall on 21 April 2018, at UFC Fight Night 128. However, Costa pulled out of the fight in mid-March with an arm injury. In turn, promotion officials elected to pull Hall from that event entirely and reschedule the pairing for 7 July 2018, at UFC 226. Costa won the fight via technical knockout in round two. The win earned him his second Performance of the Night award.

Costa was scheduled to face Yoel Romero on 3 November 2018, at UFC 230. However, Romero indicated in mid-August that, while he had been cleared to fight, his medics had recommended that he wait another four to five months to allow facial injuries incurred during his most recent fight to fully heal.

The bout was rescheduled again, and was expected to take place on 27 April 2019, at UFC on ESPN+ 8. Costa was removed from the card for an undisclosed reason. He was replaced by Ronaldo Souza. Romero then pulled out of the fight due to pneumonia, and Costa was scheduled to face Souza, but a United States Anti-Doping Agency (USADA) investigation prevented Costa from participating, so neither Romero nor Costa competed in the event.

It was revealed that Costa had been suspended for six months by USADA and Comissão Atlética Brasileira de MMA (CABMMA) for receiving prohibited intravenous infusions (IV) more than 100 mL in 12 hours after the weigh-ins in June 2017 at UFC 212 against Oluwale Bamgbose and November 2017 at UFC 217 against Johny Hendricks. Costa was fined a third of his purse of the fights, which were reverted to his opponents. The suspension was retroactive to 10 August 2018, and Costa was eligible to fight again in February 2019. On 23 March 2020, Lucas Penchel MSc, who provided the infusions in question, accepted a two-year ban from USADA, starting on 13 March 2020.

Costa finally faced Romero on 17 August 2019, at UFC 241. He won the fight via unanimous decision. This fight earned him the Fight of the Night award.

On the strength of his five-fight win streak in the UFC, Costa faced Israel Adesanya for the UFC Middleweight Championship on 27 September 2020 at UFC 253. He lost the fight via technical knockout in the second round, making this his first professional loss.

Costa was scheduled to face Robert Whittaker on 17 April 2021 at UFC on ESPN 22. However, on 16 March Costa withdrew from the fight due to illness, and was replaced by Kelvin Gastelum.

Costa was scheduled to face Jared Cannonier on 21 August 2021 at UFC on ESPN 29. However, on 4 June, Costa withdrew from the bout for unknown reasons. Costa later claimed he never signed the bout agreement and cited issues with his payment, while not confirming them as the reason for his withdrawal.

Costa faced Marvin Vettori in a light heavyweight bout on 23 October 2021 at UFC Fight Night 196, which was originally scheduled as a middleweight contest and briefly changed to a catchweight bout. Costa received widespread criticism for showing up twenty-five pounds over the middleweight limit. Costa lost the fight via unanimous decision.

Costa was scheduled to face former UFC Middleweight champion Luke Rockhold on 30 July 2022, at UFC 277. However, the bout was postponed to UFC 278 for unknown reasons. Costa won the fight via unanimous decision. The fight earned him the Fight of the Night award.

Costa was scheduled to face Robert Whittaker on 12 February 2023, at UFC 284. However, Costa disputed the official announcement by the promotion indicating he had never signed a contract and the fight would not take place.

Costa was scheduled to face Ikram Aliskerov on 29 July 2023, at UFC 291. However, it was announced on 19 July that the promotion opted to scrap the pairing and instead move him to face Khamzat Chimaev on 21 October 2023, at UFC 294. In turn, Costa pulled out of the fight due to injury, and was replaced by Kamaru Usman.

Costa faced former UFC Middleweight champion Robert Whittaker on 17 February 2024, at UFC 298. Despite almost finishing Whittaker at the end of the first round with a head kick, Costa ended up losing the bout by unanimous decision.

Costa faced former UFC Middleweight champion Sean Strickland on 1 June 2024, at UFC 302. He lost the fight by split decision.

Costa was scheduled to face Roman Kopylov on 28 June 2025, at UFC 317. However, for unknown reasons, the bout was moved to UFC 318, which took place on 19 July 2025. Costa won the fight by unanimous decision.

Costa was scheduled to face Sharabutdin Magomedov on 22 November 2025, at UFC Fight Night 265. However, Magomedov withdrew due to undergoing nose surgery.

Costa was scheduled to face Brunno Ferreira on 7 March 2026 at UFC 326. However, Costa pulled out on December 26 due to undisclosed reasons and was eventually replaced by Gregory Rodrigues.

=== Light Heavyweight ===
Moving up to light heavyweight, Costa faced Azamat Murzakanov on 11 April 2026, in the co-main event of UFC 327. Costa won the bout by technical knockout via head kick in the third round, handing Murzakanov the first loss of his mixed martial arts career.

== Championships and accomplishments ==
- Ultimate Fighting Championship
  - Performance of the Night (Two times) vs. Garreth McLellan and Uriah Hall
  - Fight of the Night (Two times) vs. Yoel Romero & Luke Rockhold
  - Second most significant strikes landed-per-minute in UFC Middleweight division history (6.21)
  - UFC Honors Awards
    - 2019: President's Choice Fight of the Year Nominee vs. Yoel Romero
  - UFC.com Awards
    - 2017: Ranked #7 Newcomer of the Year
    - 2019: Ranked #3 Fight of the Year vs. Yoel Romero
- Jungle Fight
  - Jungle Fight Middleweight Championship (One time)
    - One successful title defense
- MMA Junkie
  - 2019 August Fight of the Month vs. Yoel Romero
  - 2024 February Fight of the Month vs. Robert Whittaker
- Sherdog
  - 2019 Round of the Year vs. Yoel Romero (round 1)
- ESPN
  - 2020 Rivalry of the Year vs. Israel Adesanya

== Controversies ==
=== Alleged assault on a nurse ===
On 31 May 2022, Costa was questioned by the police in the Metropolitan Region of Belo Horizonte, Brazil, regarding an incident in which he was accused of striking a nurse with his elbow during a dispute over a COVID-19 vaccination card. Costa claimed he was already vaccinated but had not had it recorded on his vaccination card, and that he asked the nurse to sign his card. The nurse, however, claimed that Costa had not been vaccinated and refused to sign, and that he attempted to flee with the filled-out vaccination card without the shot being administered. She went on to say that in an effort to prevent him from leaving, she grabbed Costa by the arm, and she was hit with an elbow to her face, which caused her lips to become swollen. No charges were filed.

== Mixed martial arts record ==
Professional record breakdown
20 matches	16 wins	4 losses
By knockout	12	1
By submission	1	0
By decision	3	3

Res.	Record	Opponent	Method	Event	Date	Round	Time	Location	Notes
Win	16–4	Azamat Murzakanov	TKO (head kick)	UFC 327	11 April 2026	3	1:23	Miami, Florida, United States	Return to Light Heavyweight.
Win	15–4	Roman Kopylov	Decision (unanimous)	UFC 318	19 July 2025	3	5:00	New Orleans, Louisiana, United States	
Loss	14–4	Sean Strickland	Decision (split)	UFC 302	1 June 2024	5	5:00	Newark, New Jersey, United States	
Loss	14–3	Robert Whittaker	Decision (unanimous)	UFC 298	17 February 2024	3	5:00	Anaheim, California, United States	
Win	14–2	Luke Rockhold	Decision (unanimous)	UFC 278	20 August 2022	3	5:00	Salt Lake City, Utah, United States	Return to Middleweight. Fight of the Night.
Loss	13–2	Marvin Vettori	Decision (unanimous)	UFC Fight Night: Costa vs. Vettori	23 October 2021	5	5:00	Las Vegas, Nevada, United States	Light Heavyweight debut. Costa was deducted one point in round 2 due to an eye poke.
Loss	13–1	Israel Adesanya	TKO (punches and elbows)	UFC 253	27 September 2020	2	3:59	Abu Dhabi, United Arab Emirates	For the UFC Middleweight Championship.
Win	13–0	Yoel Romero	Decision (unanimous)	UFC 241	17 August 2019	3	5:00	Anaheim, California, United States	Fight of the Night.
Win	12–0	Uriah Hall	TKO (punches)	UFC 226	7 July 2018	2	2:38	Las Vegas, Nevada, United States	Performance of the Night.
Win	11–0	Johny Hendricks	TKO (punches)	UFC 217	4 November 2017	2	1:23	New York City, New York, United States	
Win	10–0	Oluwale Bamgbose	TKO (punches)	UFC 212	3 June 2017	2	1:06	Rio de Janeiro, Brazil	
Win	9–0	Garreth McLellan	TKO (punches)	UFC Fight Night: Belfort vs. Gastelum	11 March 2017	1	1:17	Fortaleza, Brazil	Performance of the Night.
Win	8–0	Adriano Balby de Araujo	KO (punch)	Jungle Fight 90	3 September 2016	1	3:25	São Paulo, Brazil	Defended the Jungle Fight Middleweight Championship.
Win	7–0	Eduardo Ramón	Submission (rear-naked choke)	Jungle Fight 87	21 May 2016	1	2:40	São Paulo, Brazil	Won the vacant Jungle Fight Middleweight Championship.
Win	6–0	Bruno Assis	TKO (punches)	Jungle Fight 84	5 December 2015	1	1:17	São Paulo, Brazil	
Win	5–0	Wagner Silva Gomes	TKO (punches)	Face to Face 11	24 April 2015	1	4:37	Rio de Janeiro, Brazil	Won the vacant Face to Face Middleweight Championship.
Win	4–0	Gérson da Conceição	TKO (doctor stoppage)	Face to Face 9	19 December 2014	1	5:00	Rio de Janeiro, Brazil	
Win	3–0	Fábio Moreira	TKO (punches)	BH Fight: MMA Grand Prix	1 November 2013	1	1:26	Belo Horizonte, Brazil	
Win	2–0	Ademilson Borges	TKO (head kick and punches)	Upper Fight: MMA Championship 2	15 June 2013	1	0:32	Teófilo Otoni, Brazil	
Win	1–0	Téo Esteves	TKO (head kick and punches)	MMA Total Combat: Santa Luzia	5 February 2012	1	2:08	Santa Luzia, Brazil	Middleweight debut.

Exhibition record breakdown		
2 matches	1 win	1 loss
By submission	1	0
By decision	0	1

Res.	Record	Opponent	Method	Event	Date	Round	Time	Location	Notes
Loss	1–1	Márcio Alexandre Jr.	Decision (split)	The Ultimate Fighter: Brazil 3	20 April 2014 (airdate)	3	5:00	São Paulo, Brazil	The Ultimate Fighter: Brazil 3 Quarterfinal Round.
Win	1–0	José Roberto	Submission (guillotine choke)	The Ultimate Fighter: Brazil 3	9 March 2014 (airdate)	2	N/A	São Paulo, Brazil	The Ultimate Fighter: Brazil 3 Elimination Round.

== Pay-per-view bouts ==
No.	Event	Fight	Date	Venue	City	PPV buys
1.	UFC 253	Adesanya vs. Costa	27 September 2020	Flash Forum	Abu Dhabi, United Arab Emirates	700,000

== See also ==
- List of current UFC fighters
- List of male mixed martial artists
