= UFC 226 =

UFC mixed martial arts event in 2018

UFC 226: Miocic vs. Cormier
- The poster for UFC 226: Miocic vs. Cormier
- Promotion: Ultimate Fighting Championship
- Date: July 7, 2018
- Venue: T-Mobile Arena
- City: Paradise, Nevada
- Attendance: 17,464
- Total gate: $5,677,238.21
- Buyrate: 380,000

Event chronology
The Ultimate Fighter: Undefeated Finale	UFC 226: Miocic vs. Cormier	UFC Fight Night: dos Santos vs. Ivanov

UFC 226: Miocic vs. Cormier was a mixed martial arts event produced by the Ultimate Fighting Championship held on July 7, 2018, at the T-Mobile Arena in Paradise, Nevada, part of the Las Vegas Metropolitan Area.

== Background ==
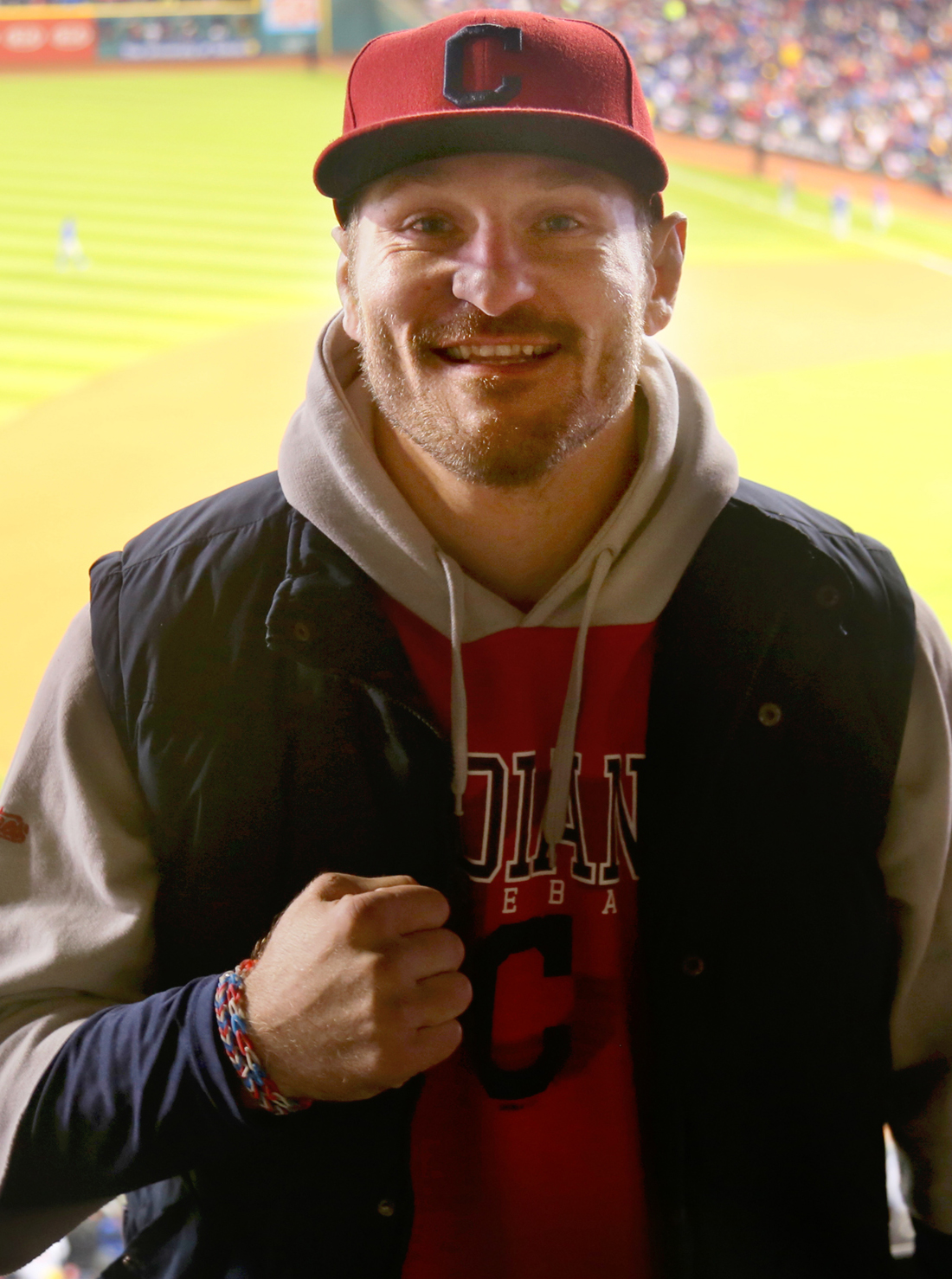
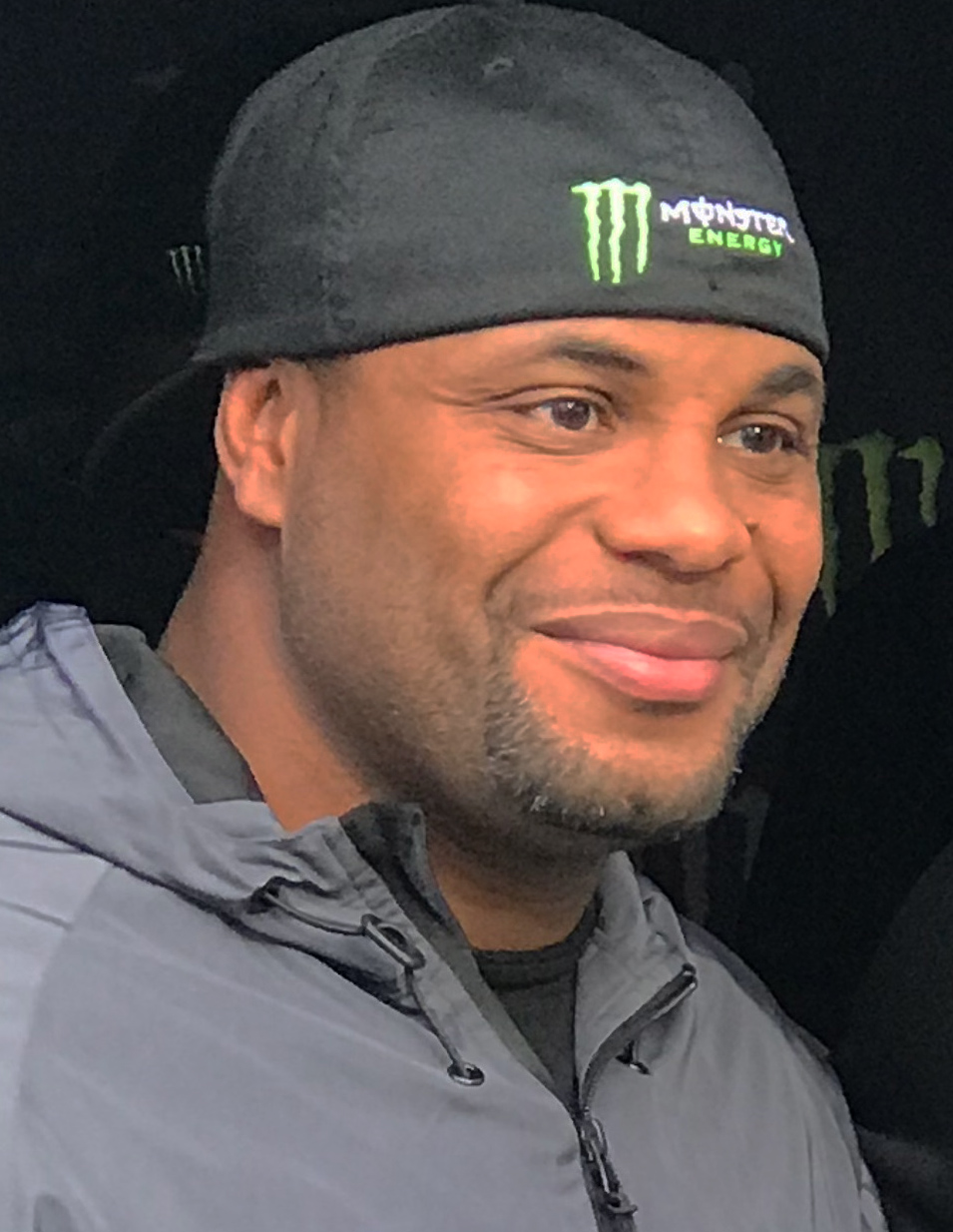
Miocic (left) holds the UFC heavyweight record of title defenses (3), while Cormier (right) has the same amount of light heavyweight defenses and a 13–0 record competing at heavyweight.

The event took place during the UFC's annual International Fight Week.

A UFC Heavyweight Championship bout between current champion Stipe Miocic and current UFC Light Heavyweight Champion Daniel Cormier headlined the event. They also served as the head coaches of The Ultimate Fighter: Undefeated. Cormier would knock out Miocic in the first round, becoming only the second fighter to be champion in two divisions simultaneously (after Conor McGregor who won the UFC Lightweight Championship at UFC 205 when he was the reigning UFC Featherweight Champion) as well as the fifth overall to win a title in different divisions. This was the third time in UFC history that champions in different divisions fought for the same title, following UFC 94 and UFC 205.

A UFC Featherweight Championship bout between current champion Max Holloway and Brian Ortega was expected to take place at the event. However, on July 4, Holloway was pulled from the fight due to "concussion like symptoms". As a result, Ortega was removed from the card as well.

Gökhan Saki was expected to face Khalil Rountree Jr. at UFC 219. However, Saki pulled out of the fight citing a leg injury. The pairing eventually took place at this event.

Paulo Costa was scheduled to face Uriah Hall at UFC Fight Night: Barboza vs. Lee. However, Costa pulled out of the fight in mid-March with an arm injury. In turn, promotion officials elected to pull Hall from that event entirely and rescheduled the pairing for this event.

The Ultimate Fighter: Live lightweight winner Michael Chiesa was expected to face former WEC and UFC Lightweight Champion Anthony Pettis at UFC 223, but was pulled from the bout due to multiple cuts from a broken window as a result of the Team SBG bus melee. The bout eventually took place at this event.

Yancy Medeiros was expected to face Mike Perry at the event. However, he pulled out of the fight in late-June citing a rib injury and was replaced by Paul Felder.

At the weigh-ins, Chiesa weighed in at 157.5 pounds, 1.5 pounds over the lightweight non-title fight limit of 156 pounds. His bout against Pettis was contested at catchweight and he forfeited 30 percent of his purse.

== Results ==
Main Card
Weight class				Method	Round	Time	Notes
Heavyweight	Daniel Cormier	def.	Stipe Miocic (c)	KO (punches)	1	4:33	(Note: For the UFC Heavyweight Championship.)
Heavyweight	Derrick Lewis	def.	Francis Ngannou	Decision (unanimous) (29–28, 29–28, 30–27)	3	5:00
Welterweight	Mike Perry	def.	Paul Felder	Decision (split) (29–28, 28–29, 29–28)	3	5:00
Catchweight (157.5 lb)	Anthony Pettis	def.	Michael Chiesa	Submission (triangle armbar)	2	0:52
Light Heavyweight	Khalil Rountree Jr.	def.	Gökhan Saki	KO (punches)	1	1:36
Preliminary Card (Fox Sports 1)
Middleweight	Paulo Costa	def.	Uriah Hall	TKO (punches)	2	2:38
Bantamweight	Raphael Assunção	def.	Rob Font	Decision (unanimous) (30–27, 30–27, 30–27)	3	5:00
Lightweight	Drakkar Klose	def.	Lando Vannata	Decision (unanimous) (30–27, 30–27, 30–27)	3	5:00
Welterweight	Curtis Millender	def.	Max Griffin	Decision (unanimous) (29–28, 29–28, 29–28)	3	5:00
Preliminary Card (UFC Fight Pass)
Lightweight	Dan Hooker	def.	Gilbert Burns	KO (punches)	1	2:28
Women's Strawweight	Emily Whitmire	def.	Jamie Moyle	Decision (unanimous) (29–28, 29–28, 29–28)	3	5:00

== Bonus awards ==
The following fighters received $50,000 bonuses:

- Fight of the Night: None awarded
- Performance of the Night: Daniel Cormier, Anthony Pettis, Khalil Rountree Jr. and Paulo Costa

== Reported payout ==
The following is the reported payout to the fighters as reported to the Nevada State Athletic Commission. It does not include sponsor money and also does not include the UFC's traditional "fight night" bonuses. The total disclosed payout for the event was $2,737,000.

- Daniel Cormier: $500,000 def. Stipe Miocic: $750,000
- Derrick Lewis: $260,000 (includes $130,000 win bonus) def. Francis Ngannou: $100,000
- Mike Perry: $80,000 ($40,000 win bonus) def. Paul Felder: $46,000
- Anthony Pettis: $289,400 ($135,000 win bonus) def. Michael Chiesa: $25,600*
- Khalil Rountree Jr.: $38,000 ($19,000 win bonus) def. Gokhan Saki: $85,000
- Paulo Costa: $110,000 ($55,000 win bonus) def. Uriah Hall: $48,000
- Raphael Assunção: $130,000 ($60,000 win bonus) def. Rob Font: $33,000
- Drakkar Klose: $44,000 ($22,000 win bonus) def. Lando Vannata: $25,000
- Curtis Millender: $30,000 ($15,000 win bonus) def. Max Griffin: $20,000
- Dan Hooker: $60,000 ($30,000 win bonus) def. Gilbert Burns: $31,000
- Emily Whitmire: $20,000 ($10,000 win bonus) def. Jamie Moyle: $12,000

^ Chiesa was fined $11,400, 30 percent of his purse for failing to make the required weight for his fight with Anthony Pettis. That money was issued to Pettis, an NSAC official confirmed.

== See also ==
- List of UFC events
- 2018 in UFC
- List of current UFC fighters
