= Brandon Davis =

American mixed martial arts fighter (born 1990)

- Born: Brandon Michael Davis; May 8, 1990 (age 36); Atlanta, Georgia, U.S.
- Other names: Killer B
- Height: 5 ft 10 in (178 cm)
- Weight: 146 lb (66 kg; 10 st 6 lb)
- Division: Bantamweight; Featherweight
- Reach: 72 in (183 cm)
- Fighting out of: D'Iberville, Mississippi, U.S.
- Team: Alan Belcher MMA Club
- Rank: Purple belt in Brazilian Jiu-Jitsu under Alan Belcher; Brown belt in Muay Thai
- Years active: 2010–present

Mixed martial arts record
- Total: 29
- Wins: 15
- By knockout: 4
- By submission: 4
- By decision: 7
- Losses: 13
- By knockout: 1
- By submission: 2
- By decision: 10
- No contests: 1

Other information
- Occupation: Regional manager for a pulmonary company
- University: Itawamba Community College; Mississippi State University
- Mixed martial arts record from Sherdog

Brandon Michael Davis (born May 8, 1990) is an American mixed martial artist who competed in the Bantamweight division of the Ultimate Fighting Championship (UFC).

== Background ==
Davis began training in Brazilian Jiu-Jitsu at the age of 20, while attending Mississippi State University. His first fight came after training just for four months of training. He later transitioned to mixed martial arts (MMA) and joined Dana White's Contender Series, where he earned his contract with UFC.

== Mixed martial arts career ==
=== Early career ===
Davis fought mostly in the southern region especially his adopted state of Mississippi. He participated in Dana White's Contender Series 4 in 2017 where he won the fight against Austin Arnett and he was signed by UFC. He amassed a record of 8–2, on a seven winning streak of prior joining UFC.

=== Ultimate Fighting Championship ===
Davis made his promotion debut on January 20, 2018, facing Kyle Bochniak, at UFC 220. He lost the fight via unanimous decision.

On February 18, 2018, Davis was scheduled to meet Humberto Bandenay at UFC Fight Night: Cowboy vs. Medeiros. However, due to visa issue, Bandenay was pulled from the card and was replaced by Steven Peterson. He won the fight via unanimous decision. This fight earned him the Fight of the Night award.

His next fight came three months later on May 19, 2018. He faced Enrique Barzola at UFC Fight Night: Maia vs. Usman. He lost his second UFC fight via unanimous decision.

Davis faced Zabit Magomedsharipov on September 8, 2018, at UFC 228. He lost the fight via submission in the second round.

Davis faced touted newcomer Randy Costa on April 13, 2019, at UFC 236. He won the fight via a rear-naked choke submission in the second round.

Davis faced Kang Kyung-ho on August 17, 2019, at UFC 241. He lost the fight via split decision.

Davis faced promotional newcomer Giga Chikadze on September 28, 2019, at UFC on ESPN+ 18. He lost the fight via split decision. Davis was subsequently released from the UFC.

=== Post-UFC career ===
After being released from the UFC, Davis signed with Gulf Coast MMA. He won three fights in a row meanwhile capturing the organization's Bantamweight Championship. In his first title defense attempt, he faced Josh Huber for the Gulf Coast MMA Bantamweight Championship at Gulf Coast MMA 11 on August 14, 2021. He won the fight via first-round knockout.

=== Return to UFC ===
Davis faced Danaa Batgerel on October 16, 2021, at UFC Fight Night 195. Davis lost the fight via technical knockout in round one.

Davis faced Leomana Martinez on October 15, 2022, at UFC Fight Night 212. He lost the fight via split decision.

It was announced in mid January that Davis was released by UFC.

=== Gamebred Bareknuckle MMA ===
After losing against Joshua Weems at Gulf Coast MMA 9 via unanimous decision, Davis faced Ago Huskić on September 8, 2023, at Gamebred Fighting Championship 5, losing once again via unanimous decision.

Davis faced Joe Penafiel at Gamebred Bareknuckle MMA 6 on November 10, 2023. He won the fight via unanimous decision.

Davis faced Randy Costa in a rematch for the inaugural bantamweight title at Gamebred Bareknuckle MMA 8 on November 15, 2024. The bout ended via no-contest due to an illegal knee from Davis and Costa was deemed unable to continue in round one.

=== Professional Fighters League ===
Davis was reportedly scheduled to face Luciano Pereira on July 18, 2026, at PFL Austin. However, the bout was never materialized.

Replacing Mando Gutierrez, Davis made his PFL debut against Nkosi Ndebele on July 25, 2026, at PFL Washington DC. He lost the fight via unanimous decision.

== Personal life ==
Davis earned an Athletic Training degree from Itawamba Community College and a degree in Biological Sciences at Mississippi State University.

== Championships and accomplishments ==
- Ultimate Fighting Championship
  - Fight of the Night (One time) vs. Steven Peterson
- Gulf Coast MMA
  - Gulf Coast MMA Bantamweight Championship (one time; current)
    - One successful title defense

== Mixed martial arts record ==
Professional record breakdown
29 matches	15 wins	13 losses
By knockout	4	1
By submission	4	2
By decision	7	10
No contests	1	

Res.	Record	Opponent	Method	Event	Date	Round	Time	Location	Notes
Loss	15–13 (1)	Nkosi Ndebele	Decision (unanimous)	PFL Washington DC: Jean vs. Rodriguez	July 25, 2026	3	5:00	Washington, D.C., United States	Catchweight (140 lb) bout.
NC	15–12 (1)	Randy Costa	NC (illegal knee)	Gamebred Bareknuckle MMA 8	November 15, 2024	1	2:47	Biloxi, Mississippi, United States	For the inaugural Gamebred FC Bantamweight Championship. Accidental illegal knee rendered Costa unable to continue.
Win	15–12	Joseph Penafiel	Decision (unanimous)	Gamebred Bareknuckle MMA 6	November 10, 2023	3	5:00	Biloxi, Mississippi, United States	
Loss	14–12	Ago Huskić	Decision (unanimous)	Gamebred Bareknuckle MMA 5	September 8, 2023	3	5:00	Jacksonville, Florida, United States	Featherweight bout.
Loss	14–11	Joshua Weems	Decision (unanimous)	Gulf Coast MMA 19	April 14, 2023	5	5:00	Biloxi, Mississippi, United States	For the vacant GCMMA Bantamweight Championship.
Loss	14–10	Leomana Martinez	Decision (split)	UFC Fight Night: Grasso vs. Araújo	October 15, 2022	3	5:00	Las Vegas, Nevada, United States	
Loss	14–9	Danaa Batgerel	TKO (elbows and punches)	UFC Fight Night: Ladd vs. Dumont	October 16, 2021	1	2:01	Las Vegas, Nevada, United States	
Win	14–8	Josh Huber	TKO (body kick and punches)	Gulf Coast MMA 11	August 14, 2021	1	1:31	Biloxi, Mississippi, United States	Defended the GCMMA Bantamweight Championship.
Win	13–8	Rey Trujillo	Decision (unanimous)	Gulf Coast MMA 9	March 20, 2021	3	5:00	Biloxi, Mississippi, United States	Featherweight bout.
Win	12–8	Jonathan Eiland	Submission (rear-naked choke)	Gulf Coast MMA 7	November 21, 2020	2	4:00	Hattiesburg, Mississippi, United States	Return to Bantamweight. Won the inaugural GCMMA Bantamweight Championship.
Win	11–8	Brad Kelly	Decision (split)	Gulf Coast MMA 6	September 26, 2020	3	5:00	Hattiesburg, Mississippi, United States	
Loss	10–8	Giga Chikadze	Decision (split)	UFC Fight Night: Hermansson vs. Cannonier	September 28, 2019	3	5:00	Copenhagen, Denmark	Return to Featherweight.
Loss	10–7	Kang Kyung-ho	Decision (split)	UFC 241	August 17, 2019	3	5:00	Anaheim, California, United States	
Win	10–6	Randy Costa	Submission (rear-naked choke)	UFC 236	April 13, 2019	2	1:12	Atlanta, Georgia, United States	Bantamweight debut.
Loss	9–6	Zabit Magomedsharipov	Submission (hamstring stretch)	UFC 228	September 8, 2018	2	3:46	Dallas, Texas, United States	
Loss	9–5	Enrique Barzola	Decision (unanimous)	UFC Fight Night: Maia vs. Usman	May 19, 2018	3	5:00	Santiago, Chile	
Win	9–4	Steven Peterson	Decision (unanimous)	UFC Fight Night: Cowboy vs. Medeiros	February 18, 2018	3	5:00	Austin, Texas, United States	Fight of the Night.
Loss	8–4	Kyle Bochniak	Decision (unanimous)	UFC 220	January 20, 2018	3	5:00	Boston, Massachusetts, United States	
Win	8–3	Austin Arnett	Decision (unanimous)	Dana White's Contender Series 4	August 1, 2017	3	5:00	Las Vegas, Nevada, United States	
Win	7–3	Randy Hedderick	TKO (punches)	Fight Force International: Blood and Sand 22	June 10, 2017	1	3:11	Biloxi, Mississippi, United States	Won the vacant FFI Featherweight Championship.
Win	6–3	Max Mustaki	Decision (unanimous)	Island Fights 40	April 14, 2017	3	5:00	Pensacola, Florida, United States	Lightweight bout.
Win	5–3	Latral Perdue	Submission (guillotine choke)	Summit FC: Tupelo	November 5, 2016	1	0:42	Tupelo, Mississippi, United States	
Loss	4–3	Dawond Pickney	Decision (split)	Summit FC: Jackson	October 6, 2016	3	5:00	Jackson, Mississippi, United States	Lightweight bout.
Win	4–2	Thomas Vasquez	Decision (unanimous)	Summit FC 15	March 5, 2016	3	5:00	Tupelo, Mississippi, United States	
Win	3–2	Adam Denton	KO (punch)	Summit FC 14	July 25, 2015	1	3:59	Tupelo, Mississippi, United States	Return to Featherweight.
Win	2–2	Lawrence Purifoy	Submission (guillotine choke)	Summit FC 13	June 13, 2015	1	4:45	Jackson, Mississippi, United States	Lightweight debut.
Loss	1–2	Jesse Sanderson	Decision (unanimous)	Summit FC 11	March 7, 2015	3	5:00	Tupelo, Mississippi, United States	
Loss	1–1	Jorge Medina	Submission (rear-naked choke)	Summit FC 8	September 13, 2014	2	3:11	Vicksburg, Mississippi, United States	
Win	1–0	Brandon Pemberton	TKO (punches)	Summit FC 5	July 19, 2014	1	N/A	Southaven, Mississippi, United States	Featherweight debut.

== See also ==
- List of male mixed martial artists
