= Lucas Martins =

Brazilian mixed martial arts fighter

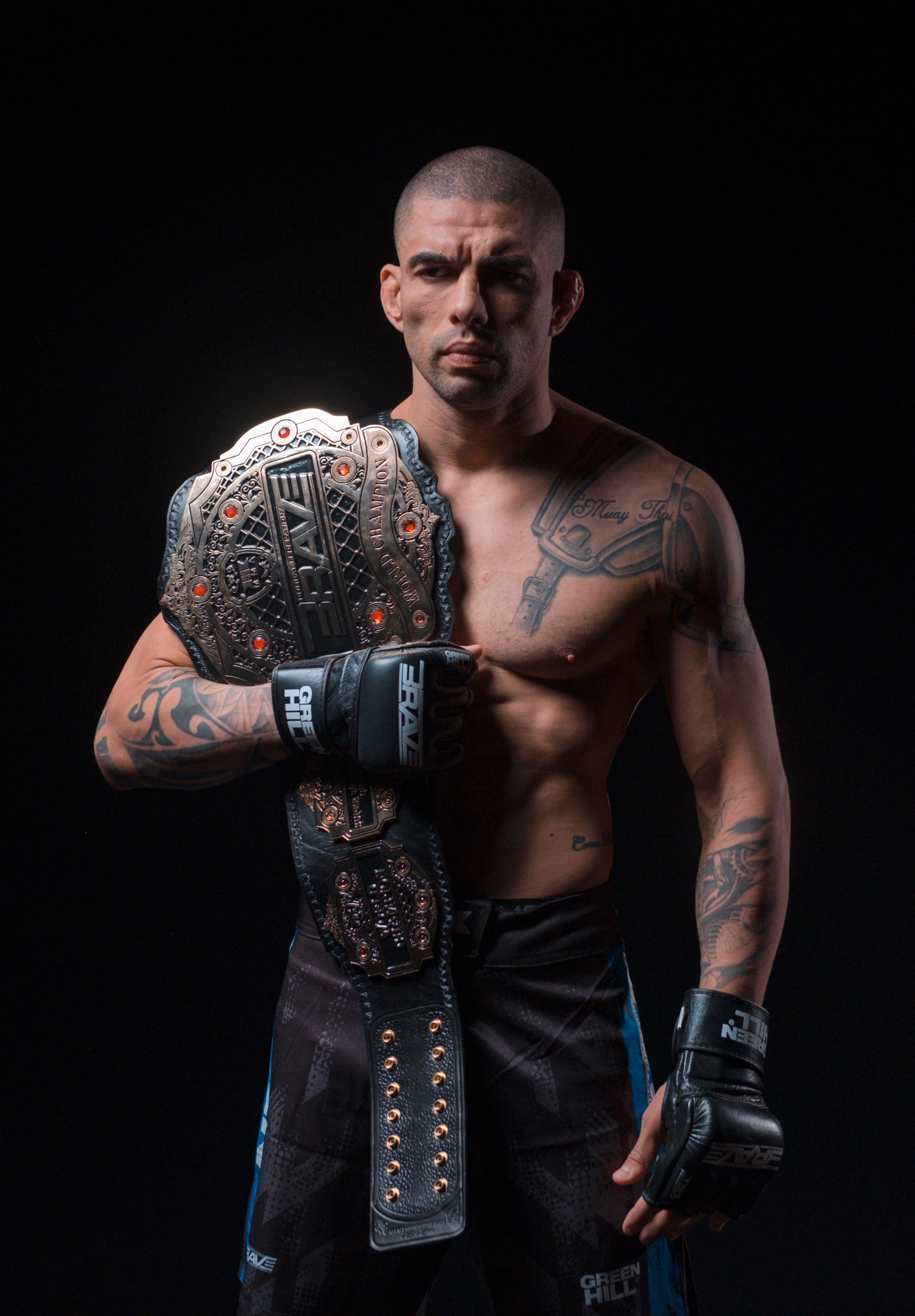
- Lucas Martins at BRAVE CF
- Born: 11 November 1988 (age 38); Montes Claros, Minas Gerais, Brazil
- Other names: Mineiro
- Height: 6 ft 0 in (1.83 m)
- Weight: 145 lb (66 kg; 10.4 st); 187 lb (85 kg; 13.4 st) (walk around weight)
- Division: Bantamweight; Featherweight; Lightweight
- Reach: 72.0 in (183 cm)
- Style: Muay Thai
- Fighting out of: Montes Claros, Minas Gerais, Brazil
- Team: Chute Boxe Academy; Macaco Gold Team
- Rank: Purple belt in Brazilian Jiu-Jitsu
- Years active: 2011–present

Mixed martial arts record
- Total: 29
- Wins: 22
- By knockout: 14
- By submission: 5
- By decision: 3
- Losses: 7
- By knockout: 5
- By submission: 1
- By decision: 1

Other information
- Mixed martial arts record from Sherdog

Lucas Martins (born 11 November 1988) is a Brazilian mixed martial artist who competes in the lightweight division of Brave Combat Federation, where he is a former interim lightweight champion. A professional mixed martial artist since 2011, Martins has also competed in the Ultimate Fighting Championship.

== Mixed martial arts career ==
=== Early career ===
Martins started his MMA career in 2011; before that he competed in muay thai, achieving a 34–2 record. He fought only for Brazilian-based promotions such as Jungle Fight and MMA Rocks. With a record of twelve wins and no losses, Martins signed with the UFC.

Lucas Martins is managed by Wade Hampel of Big Fight Management.

=== Ultimate Fighting Championship ===
Martins made his promotional debut on short notice, replacing an injured Justin Salas against Edson Barboza on 19 January 2013 at UFC on FX: Belfort vs. Bisping. Martins had his first defeat due to TKO (retirement) in the first round.

Martins faced Jeremy Larsen, a contestant of The Ultimate Fighter: Live, on 18 May 2013, at UFC on FX: Belfort vs. Rockhold. Despite taking a significant amount of damage in the first two rounds, Martins knocked Larsen out early in the third round. The performance earned both participants Fight of the Night honors.

Martins next dropped from lightweight to bantamweight and faced promotional newcomer Junior Hernandez on 4 September 2013, at UFC Fight Night: Teixeira vs. Bader. He won the fight via technical submission in the first round.

Martins was expected to face Johnny Eduardo on 9 November 2013, at UFC Fight Night 32. However, both fighters were removed from the card due to injury.

Martins was expected to face Bryan Caraway on 22 February 2014, at UFC 170. However, Caraway pulled out of the bout citing and injury and was replaced by UFC newcomer Aljamain Sterling.

Martins was expected to face Jim Alers in a featherweight bout on 16 July 2014, at UFC Fight Night 45. However, Alers pulled out of the bout citing injury and was replaced by Alex White. Martins won the back and forth fight via knockout in the third round. The win also earned him his first Performance of the Night bonus award.

Martins faced Darren Elkins on 25 October 2014, at UFC 179. Elkins defeated Martins via split decision.

Martins faced Mirsad Bektić on 30 May 2015, at UFC Fight Night 67, replacing Renato Moicano. He lost the fight via TKO in the second round.

Martins faced Robert Whiteford on 10 April 2016, at UFC Fight Night 86. Martins won the fight via split decision. Subsequently, the UFC elected not to renew Martin's contract – allowing him to sign elsewhere.

=== Brave CF ===
After racking a couple of wins in Brazil's regional circuit, Martins signed with Brave Combat Federation. In the promotional debut Martins faced Fabian Galvan at Brave CF 3 and won the bout via Brabo choke in the second round.

On 13 April 2018, Martins faced Luan Santiago Carvalho for the interim lightweight championship. Martins was behind in the scorecards coming into the fifth and final round. In the final seconds of the round, Santiago dislocated his elbow when he was taken down by Martins and couldn't continue. Martins became a free agent after fighting out his two-fight contract with Brave, but elected to rapidly sign a new, five-fight contract with the organization.

Martins faced Abdul-Kareem Al-Selwady for the undisputed lightweight championship at Brave CF 18 on 16 November 2018. Martins injured his left leg when he was taken down by Al-Selwady in the first round and referee stopped the fight.

On 25 July 2019, Martins was defeated by Bubba Jenkins at Brave 24 by TKO at 2:48 of the first round by way of unanswered strikes. Jenkins retained the Brave CF Featherweight Championship.

Martins was next scheduled to face Felipe Silva at Brave CF 35 on 28 March 2020, but Silva withdrew from the bout and was replaced with Abdul-Rakhman Makhaziev. However, the event has been postponed until a to-be-determined date due to the COVID-19 pandemic

Martins was next expected to face Luan Santiago in a rematch at Brave CF 41 on 17 September 2020. However, Martins was forced to withdraw due to an injury and the bout was scrapped.

Martins was scheduled to face Marcel Grabinski on 4 June 2021 at Brave CF 51. However, Grabinski has to pull out from the fight due to medical condition. The bout has been called off.

Martins scheduled again to face Marcel Grabinski on 21 August 2021 at Brave CF 53. According to BRAVE CF officials, Grabinski was forced to withdraw from the rescheduled bout a little bit less than week prior to the event due to Covid-19 protocols. Marcel hadn’t traveled to Kazakhstan and was replaced by local standout Olzhas Eskaraev. In an upset, Martins lost the bout via rear-naked choke in the second round.

Martins would then go on to face Henrique Marques on 30 July 2022 at Brave CF 60, winning via TKO stoppage a minute into the bout.

Martins faced Ylies Djiroun on 7 September 2023 at Brave CF 74, knocking out his opponent in the first round.

Martins fought Abdisalam Kubanychbek for the Brave CF Lightweight Championship on 5 December 2023 at Brave CF 77, losing the bout in the first round via TKO stoppage.

==== Global Fight League ====
On 11 December 2024, it was announced that Martins was signed by Global Fight League.

Martins was scheduled to face Sage Northcutt in the inaugural Global Fight League event on May 24, 2025 at GFL 1. However, all GFL events were cancelled indefinitely.

== Personal life ==
Martins owns a gym, Capital da Luta, in São Paulo.

== Championships and accomplishments ==
=== Mixed martial arts ===
- Ultimate Fighting Championship
  - Fight of the Night (One time) vs. Alex White
  - Performance of the Night (One time) vs. Jeremy Larsen

== Mixed martial arts record ==
Professional record breakdown
29 matches	22 wins	7 losses
By knockout	14	5
By submission	5	1
By decision	3	1

Res.	Record	Opponent	Method	Event	Date	Round	Time	Location	Notes
Loss	22–7	Abdisalam Kubanychbek	TKO (punches)	Brave CF 77	5 December 2023	1	3:39	Isa Town, Bahrain	For the Brave CF Lightweight Championship.
Win	22–6	Ylies Djiroun	KO (punches)	Brave CF 74	7 September 2023	1	3:35	Nantes, France	
Win	21–6	Henrique Marques	TKO (punches)	Brave CF 60	30 July 2022	1	1:10	Isa Town, Bahrain	Return to Lightweight.
Loss	20–6	Olzhas Eskaraev	Submission (rear-naked choke)	Brave CF 53	21 August 2021	2	2:49	Almaty, Kazakhstan	Catchweight (163 lb) bout.
Loss	20–5	Bubba Jenkins	TKO (punches)	Brave CF 24	25 July 2019	1	2:48	London, England	For the Brave CF Featherweight Championship.
Loss	20–4	Abdul-Kareem Al-Selwady	TKO (leg injury)	Brave CF 18	16 November 2018	1	2:18	Isa Town, Bahrain	Lost the Brave CF Lightweight Championship.
Win	20–3	Luan Santiago Carvalho	TKO (arm injury)	Brave CF 11: Mineiro vs. Santiago	13 April 2018	5	4:56	Belo Horizonte, Brazil	Won the interim Brave CF Lightweight Championship. Later promoted to undisputed champion.
Win	19–3	Fabian Galvan	Submission (Brabo Choke)	Brave CF 3: Battle in Brazil	18 March 2017	2	4:42	São José dos Pinhais, Brazil	
Win	18–3	Gilson Lomanto	Submission (anaconda choke)	Thunder Fight 9: Lomanto vs. Mineiro	30 September 2016	1	2:24	São Paulo, Brazil	
Win	17–3	Sergio Leal	Decision (unanimous)	Thunder Fight 8: Silverio vs. Nunes	5 August 2016	3	5:00	São Paulo, Brazil	
Win	16–3	Robert Whiteford	Decision (split)	UFC Fight Night: Rothwell vs. dos Santos	10 April 2016	3	5:00	Zagreb, Croatia	
Loss	15–3	Mirsad Bektić	TKO (punches)	UFC Fight Night: Condit vs. Alves	30 May 2015	2	0:30	Goiânia, Brazil	
Loss	15–2	Darren Elkins	Decision (split)	UFC 179	25 October 2014	3	5:00	Rio de Janeiro, Brazil	
Win	15–1	Alex White	KO (punches)	UFC Fight Night: Cowboy vs. Miller	16 July 2014	3	2:08	Atlantic City, New Jersey, United States	Return to Featherweight. Performance of the Night.
Win	14–1	Junior Hernandez	Technical Submission (rear-naked choke)	UFC Fight Night: Teixeira vs. Bader	4 September 2013	1	1:10	Belo Horizonte, Brazil	Bantamweight debut.
Win	13–1	Jeremy Larsen	KO (punch)	UFC on FX: Belfort vs. Rockhold	18 May 2013	3	0:13	Jaraguá do Sul, Brazil	Fight of the Night.
Loss	12–1	Edson Barboza	TKO (punches)	UFC on FX: Belfort vs. Bisping	19 January 2013	1	2:38	São Paulo, Brazil	
Win	12–0	Oberdan Vieira	KO (head kick)	Jungle Fight 46	13 December 2012	2	3:03	São Paulo, Brazil	
Win	11–0	Thiago Sampaio	Submission (rear-naked choke)	MMA Rocks	8 December 2012	1	0:43	São Paulo, Brazil	Featherweight bout.
Win	10–0	Jonatas Bernardo	TKO (punches)	Valiant Fighters Championship 11	24 November 2012	3	1:16	Ribeirão Preto, Brazil	
Win	9–0	Carlos Eugênio	TKO (punches)	Warriors Fighting Championship 1	14 November 2012	1	1:17	Taubaté, Brazil	
Win	8–0	João Paulo Melo	TKO (body punches)	Romani Fight Brasil 2: Night Fight Aldeia X	25 October 2012	2	N/A	São Paulo, Brazil	Lightweight GP final.
Win	7–0	Francisco Pinheiro	TKO (punches)	Romani Fight Brasil 2: Night Fight Aldeia X	25 October 2012	1	N/A	São Paulo, Brazil	Lightweight GP semi-final.
Win	6–0	Renê Alves	Decision (unanimous)	Jaula Fight 2	18 August 2012	3	5:00	Arcos, Brazil	Featherweight bout.
Win	5–0	Dilson Júnior	TKO (punches)	Supremacia Fight: Duelo de Titãs	14 July 2012	1	2:06	Montes Claros, Brazil	Return to Lightweight.
Win	4–0	Washington Rodrigues	Submission (punches)	Fight Night Enjoy Drinking 3	21 April 2012	3	3:14	São Paulo, Brazil	Featherweight debut.
Win	3–0	Luiz Felipe	TKO (punches)	OctoFight 5	31 March 2012	1	2:28	Divinópolis, Brazil	
Win	2–0	Leonir Irineu	TKO (doctor stoppage)	OctoFight 4: Duelo de Titãs	22 October 2011	2	5:00	Itaúna, Brazil	
Win	1–0	Alex Hermogenes	Submission (armbar)	Qualifight	11 September 2011	1	4:48	Mogi das Cruzes, Brazil	

== See also ==
- List of current Brave CF fighters
- List of male mixed martial artists
