= UFC Fight Night: Adesanya vs. Pyfer =

Mixed martial arts event in 2026

- The poster for UFC Fight Night: Adesanya vs. Pyfer
- Promotion: Ultimate Fighting Championship
- Date: March 28, 2026
- Venue: Climate Pledge Arena
- City: Seattle, Washington, United States
- Attendance: 17,854
- Total gate: $4,195,656

Event chronology
UFC Fight Night: Evloev vs. Murphy	UFC Fight Night: Adesanya vs. Pyfer	UFC Fight Night: Moicano vs. Duncan

UFC Fight Night: Adesanya vs. Pyfer (also known as UFC Fight Night 271) was a mixed martial arts event produced by the Ultimate Fighting Championship that took place on March 28, 2026, at Climate Pledge Arena in Seattle, Washington, United States.

== Background ==
The event marked the promotion's fifth visit to Seattle and first since UFC Fight Night: Cejudo vs. Song in February 2025.

A middleweight bout between former two-time UFC Middleweight Champion Israel Adesanya and Joe Pyfer headlined the event.

A women's strawweight bout between Nicolle Caliari and promotional newcomer Caroline Foro was originally scheduled for this event. However, Caliari withdrew for undisclosed reasons and was replaced by Stephanie Luciano. Foro then withdrew as well and was replaced by Alexia Thainara. According to Foro's team, she tested positive for a diuretic that is not on the approved substance list during an out‑of‑competition drug test earlier in the year, which they stated was not taken intentionally. Subsequently, Luciano withdrew due to an undisclosed injury and was replaced by Bruna Brasil, setting up a rematch between Brasil and Thainara. The two previously fought at an independent promotion in November 2019, where Brasil won by guillotine‑choke submission in the third round.

A heavyweight bout between Marcin Tybura and Valter Walker was scheduled for the event. However, Walker withdrew due to a foot fracture and was replaced by promotional newcomer Tyrell Fortune.

A welterweight bout between The Ultimate Fighter: Live lightweight winner Michael Chiesa and Carlston Harris was scheduled for the event. However, Harris withdrew due to visa issues and was replaced by Niko Price. The bout served as the retirement fight for Chiesa.

A featherweight bout between Road to UFC Season 3 featherweight winner Zhu Kangjie and fellow promotional newcomer Márcio Barbosa was scheduled for the event. However, Zhu withdrew due to a broken nose, so the bout was cancelled.

During the event's broadcast, the inaugural UFC Flyweight Champion (also former ONE Flyweight World Champion) Demetrious Johnson was announced as the next "modern wing" UFC Hall of Fame inductee during International Fight Week festivities in Las Vegas this summer.

== Results ==
Main card (Paramount+)
Weight class				Method	Round	Time	Notes
Middleweight	Joe Pyfer	def.	Israel Adesanya	TKO (punches)	2	4:18
Women's Flyweight	Alexa Grasso	def.	Maycee Barber	KO (punch)	1	2:42
Welterweight	Michael Chiesa	def.	Niko Price	Submission (rear-naked choke)	1	1:03
Featherweight	Lerryan Douglas	def.	Julian Erosa	KO (punches)	1	3:33
Middleweight	Yousri Belgaroui	def.	Mansur Abdul-Malik	TKO (knee)	3	3:39
Lightweight	Terrance McKinney	def.	Kyle Nelson	TKO (head kick and punches)	1	0:24
Preliminary card (Paramount+)
Lightweight	Tofiq Musayev	def.	Ignacio Bahamondes	Decision (unanimous) (29–28, 29–27, 30–27)	3	5:00
Lightweight	Lance Gibson Jr.	def.	Chase Hooper	TKO (knees)	1	2:56
Heavyweight	Tyrell Fortune	def.	Marcin Tybura	Decision (unanimous) (29–28, 29–28, 30–27)	3	5:00
Women's Flyweight	Casey O'Neill	def.	Gabriella Fernandes	KO (punches)	1	3:11
Light Heavyweight	Navajo Stirling	def.	Bruno Lopes	TKO (elbows and punches)	2	4:05
Bantamweight	Ricky Simón	vs.	Adrian Yañez	Draw (majority) (29–28, 28–28, 28–28)	3	5:00
Women's Strawweight	Alexia Thainara	def.	Bruna Brasil	Decision (unanimous) (30–27, 30–27, 30–27)	3	5:00

== Bonus awards ==
The following fighters received $100,000 bonuses. The other finishes received $25,000 additional bonuses.

- Fight of the Night: Tofiq Musayev vs. Ignacio Bahamondes
- Performance of the Night: Joe Pyfer and Alexa Grasso

== Reported payout ==
The following is the reported payout to the fighters as reported to the Washington State Department of Licensing. The amounts do not include sponsor money, discretionary bonuses, viewership points, or additional earnings.

- Joe Pyfer: $400,000 (includes $125,000 win bonus) def. Israel Adesanya: $500,000
- Alexa Grasso: $260,000 (includes $130,000 win bonus) def. Maycee Barber: $85,000
- Michael Chiesa: $310,000 (includes $155,000 win bonus) def. Niko Price: $75,000
- Lerryan Douglas: $20,000 (includes $10,000 win bonus) def. Julian Erosa: $75,000
- Yousri Belgaroui: $28,000 (includes $14,000 win bonus) def. Mansur Abdul-Malik: $33,000
- Terrance McKinney: $140,000 (includes $70,000 win bonus) def. Kyle Nelson: $41,000
- Tofiq Musayev: $70,000 (includes $35,000 win bonus) def. Ignacio Bahamondes: $120,000
- Lance Gibson Jr.: $24,000 (includes $12,000 win bonus) def. Chase Hooper: $90,000
- Tyrell Fortune: $60,000 (includes $30,000 win bonus) def. Marcin Tybura: $180,000
- Casey O'Neill: $126,000 (includes $63,000 win bonus) def. Gabriella Fernandes: $31,000
- Navajo Stirling: $60,000 (includes $30,000 win bonus) def. Bruno Lopes: $12,000
- Ricky Simón: $100,000 vs. Adrian Yañez: $70,000
- Alexia Thainara: $28,000 (includes $14,000 win bonus) def. Bruna Brasil: $28,000

== See also ==
- 2026 in UFC
- List of current UFC fighters
- List of UFC events
