= UFC Fight Night: Namajunas vs. VanZant =

UFC mixed martial arts event in 2015

- The poster for UFC Fight Night: Namajunas vs. VanZant
- Promotion: Ultimate Fighting Championship
- Date: December 10, 2015
- Venue: The Chelsea at The Cosmopolitan
- City: Las Vegas, Nevada
- Attendance: 1,643
- Total gate: $234,725

Event chronology
UFC Fight Night: Henderson vs. Masvidal	UFC Fight Night: Namajunas vs. VanZant	The Ultimate Fighter: Team McGregor vs. Team Faber Finale

UFC Fight Night: Namajunas vs. VanZant (also known as UFC Fight Night 80) was a mixed martial arts event held on December 10, 2015, at The Chelsea at The Cosmopolitan in Las Vegas, Nevada.

== Background ==
The event was expected to be headlined by a women's strawweight bout between Paige VanZant and Joanne Calderwood. However on October 28, Calderwood was forced to pull out of the event and was replaced by Rose Namajunas.

The event was the first that the promotion has hosted at the venue and the first of three events in as many days in the Las Vegas Valley. It also marked the first North American card to air live exclusively on their subscription-based digital network, UFC Fight Pass.

A welterweight bout between Sheldon Westcott and Edgar García, originally scheduled for this event was moved to UFC 195.

Lyman Good was expected to face Omari Akhmedov at the event. However, Good was pulled from the bout in late October and was replaced by Sérgio Moraes.

Michael Graves was expected to face Danny Roberts at the event. However, Graves pulled out of the bout on November 30 citing an injury and was replaced by Nathan Coy.

== Results ==
Main Card (UFC Fight Pass)
Weight class				Method	Round	Time	Notes
Women's Strawweight	Rose Namajunas	def.	Paige VanZant	Submission (rear-naked choke)	5	2:25
Lightweight	Michael Chiesa	def.	Jim Miller	Submission (rear-naked choke)	2	2:57
Lightweight	Sage Northcutt	def.	Cody Pfister	Submission (guillotine choke)	2	0:41
Middleweight	Thiago Santos	def.	Elias Theodorou	Decision (unanimous) (29–28, 29–27, 29–27)	3	5:00
Preliminary Card (UFC Fight Pass)
Welterweight	Tim Means	def.	John Howard	KO (punch)	2	0:21
Welterweight	Sérgio Moraes	def.	Omari Akhmedov	TKO (punches)	3	2:18
Middleweight	Antônio Carlos Júnior	vs.	Kevin Casey	No Contest (accidental eye poke)	1	0:11	(Note: An accidental eye poke rendered Casey unable to continue; as the fight had not reached the third round, it was declared a No Contest.)
Bantamweight	Aljamain Sterling	def.	Johnny Eduardo	Submission (guillotine choke)	2	4:18
Welterweight	Santiago Ponzinibbio	def.	Andreas Ståhl	TKO (punches)	1	4:25
Welterweight	Danny Roberts	def.	Nathan Coy	Technical Submission (triangle choke)	1	2:46
Featherweight	Zubaira Tukhugov	def.	Phillipe Nover	Decision (split) (28–29, 30–27, 30–27)	3	5:00
Women's Strawweight	Kailin Curran	def.	Emily Kagan	Submission (rear-naked choke)	2	4:13

== Bonus Awards ==
The following fighters were awarded $50,000 bonuses:

- Fight of the Night: Jim Miller vs. Michael Chiesa
- Performance of the Night: Rose Namajunas and Tim Means

== Reported payout ==
The following is the reported payout to the fighters as reported to the Nevada State Athletic Commission. It does not include sponsor money and also does not include the UFC's traditional "fight night" bonuses.

- Rose Namajunas: $54,000 (includes $27,000 win bonus) def. Paige VanZant: $40,000
- Michael Chiesa: $60,000 (includes $30,000 win bonus) def. Jim Miller: $56,000
- Sage Northcutt: $80,000 (includes $40,000 win bonus) def. Cody Pfister: $12,000
- Thiago Santos: $38,000 (includes $19,000 win bonus) def. Elias Theodorou: $20,000
- Tim Means: $54,000 (includes $27,000 win bonus) def. John Howard: $27,000
- Sérgio Moraes: $28,000 (includes $14,000 win bonus) def. Omari Akhmedov: $14,000
- Kevin Casey: $28,000 (includes $14,000 win bonus) vs. Antônio Carlos Júnior: $19,000 ^
- Aljamain Sterling: $28,000 (includes $14,000 win bonus) def. Johnny Eduardo: $14,000
- Santiago Ponzinibbio: $26,000 (includes $13,000 win bonus) def. Andreas Ståhl: $10,000
- Danny Roberts: $20,000 (includes $10,000 win bonus) def. Nathan Coy: $10,000
- Zubaira Tukhugov: $24,000 (includes $12,000 win bonus) def. Phillipe Nover: $14,000
- Kailin Curran: $20,000 (includes $10,000 win bonus) def. Emily Kagan: $10,000

^ Both fighters earned show money (Casey awarded win Bonus); bout declared No Contest.

== See also ==
- List of UFC events
- 2015 in UFC
