= UFC Fight Night: Cowboy vs. Miller =

UFC mixed martial arts event in 2014

- The poster for UFC Fight Night: Cowboy vs. Miller
- Promotion: Ultimate Fighting Championship
- Date: July 16, 2014
- Venue: Revel Casino Hotel
- City: Atlantic City, New Jersey
- Attendance: 4,115

Event chronology
The Ultimate Fighter 19 Finale	UFC Fight Night: Cowboy vs. Miller	UFC Fight Night: McGregor vs. Brandão

UFC Fight Night: Cowboy vs. Miller (also known as UFC Fight Night 45) was a mixed martial arts event held on July 16, 2014, at Revel Casino Hotel in Atlantic City, New Jersey.

== Background ==
The event was headlined by a lightweight bout between Donald Cerrone and Jim Miller.

Zak Cummings was briefly linked to a bout with Kenny Robertson at the event. Cummings was pulled from the fight in favor of a matchup with Gunnar Nelson a few days later at UFC Fight Night 46 after his opponent Ryan LaFlare was removed from that card. Subsequently, Robertson was removed from the card entirely and rescheduled to face Ildemar Alcântara a week earlier at UFC 175.

Rick Story was expected to face John Howard at the event. Howard was forced out of the bout with an injury and replaced by Leonardo Mafra.

Jim Alers was expected to face Lucas Martins at the event. Alers pulled out of the bout, citing injury, and was replaced by Alex White.

Leo Kuntz was expected to make his UFC debut against Yosdenis Cedeno at the event. Kuntz was forced from the bout with an injury and replaced by promotional newcomer Jerrod Sanders.

The preliminary card bout between Cláudia Gadelha and Tina Lähdemäki was the first women's strawweight fight in UFC history.

== Results ==
Main Card (Fox Sports 1)
Weight class				Method	Round	Time	Notes
Lightweight	Donald Cerrone	def.	Jim Miller	KO (head kick)	2	3:31
Lightweight	Edson Barboza	def.	Evan Dunham	TKO (body kick and punches)	1	3:06
Welterweight	Rick Story	def.	Leonardo Mafra	Submission (arm-triangle choke)	2	2:12
Lightweight	Joe Proctor	def.	Justin Salas	TKO (punches)	2	3:27
Flyweight	John Lineker	def.	Alp Ozkilic	TKO (punches)	3	4:51
Featherweight	Lucas Martins	def.	Alex White	KO (punches)	3	2:08
Preliminary card (Fox Sports 1)
Lightweight	Gleison Tibau	def.	Pat Healy	Decision (unanimous) (30–27, 29–28, 29–28)	3	5:00
Women's Bantamweight	Leslie Smith	def.	Jessamyn Duke	TKO (punches)	1	2:24
Bantamweight	Aljamain Sterling	def.	Hugo Viana	TKO (punches)	3	3:50
Lightweight	Yosdenis Cedeno	def.	Jerrod Sanders	TKO (knee injury)	1	5:00
Preliminary card (UFC Fight Pass)
Women's Strawweight	Cláudia Gadelha	def.	Tina Lähdemäki	Decision (unanimous) (30–26, 30–27, 30–27)	3	5:00

== Bonus awards ==
The following fighters received $50,000 bonuses:

- Fight of the Night: John Lineker vs. Alptekin Özkılıç
- Performance of the Night: Donald Cerrone and Lucas Martins

== See also ==
- List of UFC events
- 2014 in UFC
