= Michael Chiesa =

American mixed martial artist (born 1987)

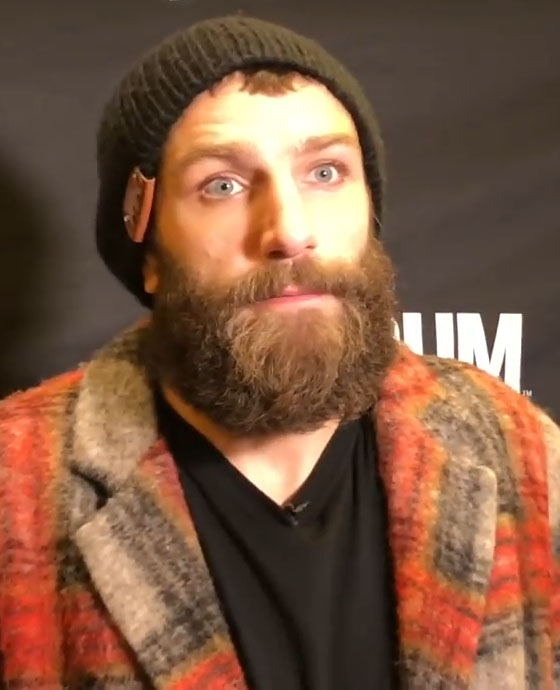
- Michael Chiesa at UFC 232 in Inglewood, California, in December 2018
- Born: Michael Keith Chiesa; December 7, 1987 (age 38); Aurora, Colorado, U.S.
- Nickname: Maverick
- Height: 6 ft 1 in (185 cm)
- Weight: 170 lb (77 kg; 12 st)
- Division: Lightweight (2011–2018); Welterweight (2008–2011, 2018–2026)
- Reach: 75 in (191 cm)
- Style: Wrestling, Kickboxing
- Stance: Southpaw
- Fighting out of: Spokane Valley, Washington, U.S.
- Team: Sikjitsu (2008–2026); Team Alpha Male; Syndicate MMA (2013–2026)
- Teacher: Rick Little
- Rank: Black belt in Brazilian Jiu-Jitsu under James Weed
- Years active: 2008–2026

Mixed martial arts record
- Total: 27
- Wins: 20
- By submission: 13
- By decision: 7
- Losses: 7
- By knockout: 1
- By submission: 5
- By decision: 1

Other information
- Website: michaelchiesa.com
- Mixed martial arts record from Sherdog

Michael Keith Chiesa (/ˌkiˈɛsə/; born December 7, 1987) is an American former professional mixed martial artist and sports analyst who competed in the Welterweight division of the Ultimate Fighting Championship (UFC). A professional from 2008 to 2026, Chiesa was the winner of FX's inaugural The Ultimate Fighter: Live.

== Background ==
Chiesa is of Italian descent and was born in Aurora, Colorado, but moved to Spokane County, Washington, in his early years, growing up in Otis Orchards-East Farms with two older sisters. His grandfather Darrell Triber was a motorcycle race promoter and is in the Hall of Fame for fast-track racing.

Having mostly just skateboarded until the age of 11, Chiesa started wrestling. Mere days before his sixteenth birthday, Chiesa moved out to live with his dad and stepmom in order to get away from his mentally and physically abusive biological mother. Chiesa wrestled for and graduated from Shadle Park High School, then attended Spokane Falls Community College for three days before dropping out in pursuit of a career in mixed martial arts.

== Mixed martial arts career ==
=== Early career ===
Chiesa began his professional mixed martial arts career in 2008. He fought for several regional promotions in the Pacific Northwest, going undefeated in his first seven fights, before gaining an opportunity to appear on The Ultimate Fighter: Live reality show.

=== The Ultimate Fighter ===
Chiesa was one of 32 lightweight fighters announced by the UFC to participate in first live season of The Ultimate Fighter reality show.

Chiesa earned his way into The Ultimate Fighter house, and a $5,000 bonus, with a submission victory over Johnavan Vistante in the elimination rounds. He was chosen as the fifth pick for Team Faber. Chiesa's terminally ill father died shortly after his victory.

After teammate Al Iaquinta picked up the first win for Team Faber, his coach decided that Chiesa would fight Jeremy Larsen next. Chiesa would go on to defeat Larsen by unanimous decision after two rounds.

For his quarter-final fight, Chiesa was matched up with the highly favored prospect, Justin Lawrence. After a hard-fought two rounds, the judges declared a draw and the fight went to a third, "sudden-victory" round. Early in the third round, Chiesa was able to reverse Lawrence on the ground, gain a mount position and win the fight by TKO, earning a $5,000 knock-out bonus and a place in the semi-finals.

Chiesa was selected to fight Team Cruz fighter, James Vick, in the semi-final round. Chiesa won the fight by technical knockout in the second round. He moved on to the finals against Team Faber teammate Al Iaquinta.

=== Ultimate Fighting Championship ===
Chiesa officially made his UFC debut at The Ultimate Fighter 15 Finale on June 1, 2012, against fellow Team Faber teammate Al Iaquinta. Chiesa defeated Iaquinta by technical submission due to a rear-naked choke 2:47 into the opening round thus becoming The Ultimate Fighter: Live's inaugural winner and received Submission of the Night honors for his efforts.

Chiesa was expected to face Rafaello Oliveira on December 8, 2012, at UFC on Fox 5. However, Oliveira was forced out of the bout with a broken hand and replaced by Marcus LeVesseur. Then, the week of the event, Chiesa was forced out of the bout with LeVesseur with the shingles and the bout was scrapped altogether.

Chiesa next fought Anton Kuivanen on February 23, 2013, at UFC 157. Chiesa submitted Kuivanen with a rear-naked choke in the second round.

Chiesa was expected to face Reza Madadi on July 27, 2013, at UFC on Fox 8. However, on May 14, 2013, it was announced Madadi was pulled from the bout due to visa issues. Chiesa instead faced Jorge Masvidal. Chiesa was stopped by Masvidal in the second round due to a d'arce choke submission, resulting in the first defeat in his professional career.

Chiesa next faced Ultimate Fighter winner Colton Smith on November 6, 2013, at UFC Fight Night 31. He won the fight via submission in the second round. The win also earned Chiesa his second Submission of the Night bonus award.

Chiesa faced Francisco Trinaldo at UFC 173 on May 24, 2014. He won the fight via unanimous decision.

Chiesa faced Joe Lauzon on September 5, 2014, at UFC Fight Night 50. After a back and forth fight, Lauzon defeated Chiesa via TKO in the second round after opening a significant cut above Chiesa's right eye, forcing a doctor's stoppage. The performance earned both participants Fight of the Night honors.

Chiesa faced Mitch Clarke on April 4, 2015, at UFC Fight Night 63. He won the fight by unanimous decision.

Chiesa faced Jim Miller on December 10, 2015, at UFC Fight Night 80. He won the fight via submission in the second round. The bout also earned Chiesa his second Fight of the Night bonus award.

Chiesa faced Beneil Dariush on April 16, 2016, at UFC on Fox 19. He won the bout via submission in the second round and was also awarded a Performance of the Night bonus.

Chiesa was expected to face Tony Ferguson on July 13, 2016, at UFC Fight Night 91. However, Chiesa pulled out of the fight on June 27 citing a back injury and was replaced by promotional newcomer Lando Vannata.

Chiesa faced Kevin Lee on June 25, 2017, at UFC Fight Night 112. At a UFC summer kick off press conference in association with UFC 211, Kevin Lee mentioned Chiesa's mother had tickets to the show, in which Chiesa responded "don't you ever talk about my mom". This verbal altercation ultimately led to punches being thrown, and both were escorted from the stage. Chiesa lost the fight via technical submission at the end of the first round. He appealed to the Oklahoma State Athletic Commission to overturn the defeat, claiming referee Mario Yamasaki erred both in stopping the fight despite no tapout nor loss of consciousness and in allowing Lee to use illegal downward elbows, which cut his head. Later, the appeal was dismissed by the commission.

Albeit having one fight left on his contract, Chiesa signed a new four-fight deal with UFC at the end of August 2017.

==== UFC 223 and Conor McGregor incident ====
Chiesa was expected to face Anthony Pettis on April 7, 2018, at UFC 223; however, the bout was canceled after a backstage incident with Conor McGregor on April 5, 2018. McGregor threw a dolly at a UFC bus that Chiesa was traveling on and broke a window. Chiesa was hit by shards of glass, which opened a cut on his forehead, and needed hospitalization subsequently resulting in the fight's cancellation.

On September 10, 2018, Chiesa told the media he has sued McGregor for assault, battery, and intentional infliction of emotional distress. He also sued Barclay's Center for negligence, although he didn't disclose the amounts or further details of either of the cases. In early 2022 news surfaced that the attorneys of both fighters filed for stipulation of discontinuance with prejudice, having reached a settlement in the process.

The bout with Pettis was rescheduled to UFC 226. At weight-ins, Chiesa weighed in at 157.5 pounds, 1.5 pounds over the lightweight limit of 156 pounds. As a result, the fight proceeded at a catchweight bout and Chiesa forfeited 30% of his purse to Pettis. Chiesa lost the fight via submission in round two. Shortly after the loss, Chiesa announced going up to welterweight division.

==== Move up to Welterweight ====
Chiesa faced Carlos Condit on December 29, 2018, at UFC 232. He won the fight via submission in the second round.

Chiesa faced Diego Sanchez on July 6, 2019, at UFC 239. He won the fight via unanimous decision. Chiesa dedicated the win to the memory of Jess Roskelley.

Chiesa faced Rafael dos Anjos on January 25, 2020, at UFC Fight Night 166. He won the fight via unanimous decision.

Chiesa faced Neil Magny on January 20, 2021, at UFC on ESPN 20. Chiesa won the fight via unanimous decision after controlling Magny on the ground for most of the 5 rounds.

Chiesa faced Vicente Luque on August 7, 2021, at UFC 265. He lost the fight via a submission in round one.

Chiesa faced Sean Brady on November 20, 2021, at UFC Fight Night 198. He lost the bout via unanimous decision.

Chiesa was scheduled to face Li Jingliang on April 8, 2023, at UFC 287. However, Jingliang pulled out of the bout due to a spine injury.

Chiesa faced Kevin Holland on July 29, 2023, at UFC 291, losing the bout via a brabo choke submission in round one.

Chiesa faced Tony Ferguson on August 3, 2024, at UFC on ABC 7. He won the fight via a rear-naked choke submission in the first round.

On his birthday, Chiesa faced Max Griffin on December 7, 2024, at UFC 310. He won the fight via a rear-naked choke submission in the third round.

Chiesa was scheduled to compete against a to be determined opponent on February 22, 2025, at UFC Fight Night 252. However, no opponent was ever announced so he was removed from the card.

Chiesa faced Court McGee on June 14, 2025, at UFC on ESPN 69. He won the fight by unanimous decision.

In his retirement bout, Chiesa was scheduled to face Carlston Harris on March 28, 2026, at UFC Fight Night 271. However, Harris withdrew due to visa issues and was replaced by Niko Price. Chiesa won the fight via a rear-naked choke submission in the first round and retired from mixed martial arts competition after the bout.

== Film and television ==
Chiesa was featured in the award-winning mixed martial arts documentary Fight Life. The film is directed by James Z. Feng and was released in 2013.

Since UFC Fight Night: Thompson vs. Till on May 27, 2018, Chiesa has been regularly acting as a desk analyst at UFC events. In 2025, he made his commentary debut on week four of season nine of Dana White's Contender Series.

== Championships and achievements ==
- Ultimate Fighting Championship
  - The Ultimate Fighter 15 Tournament winner
  - Fight of the Night (Two times) vs. Joe Lauzon and Jim Miller
  - Submission of the Night (Two times) vs. Al Iaquinta and Colton Smith
  - Performance of the Night (One time) vs. Beneil Dariush
  - Fewest strikes absorbed-per-minute in UFC Welterweight division history (0.94)
  - Most submission losses by D'Arce choke in UFC history (3)
  - Second most rear-naked choke submissions in UFC history (8) (behind Demian Maia)
  - Seventh most submissions in UFC history (9)
- Lords of the Cage
  - LOTC Lightweight Championship (One time)
- MMAJunkie.com
  - 2016 April Submission of the Month vs. Beneil Dariush
  - 2018 December Submission of the Month vs. Carlos Condit

== Mixed martial arts record ==
Professional record breakdown
27 matches	20 wins	7 losses
By knockout	0	1
By submission	13	5
By decision	7	1

Res.	Record	Opponent	Method	Event	Date	Round	Time	Location	Notes
Win	20–7	Niko Price	Submission (rear-naked choke)	UFC Fight Night: Adesanya vs. Pyfer	March 28, 2026	1	1:03	Seattle, Washington, United States	
Win	19–7	Court McGee	Decision (unanimous)	UFC on ESPN: Usman vs. Buckley	June 14, 2025	3	5:00	Atlanta, Georgia, United States	
Win	18–7	Max Griffin	Submission (rear-naked choke)	UFC 310	December 7, 2024	3	1:56	Las Vegas, Nevada, United States	
Win	17–7	Tony Ferguson	Submission (rear-naked choke)	UFC on ABC: Sandhagen vs. Nurmagomedov	August 3, 2024	1	3:44	Abu Dhabi, United Arab Emirates	
Loss	16–7	Kevin Holland	Submission (brabo choke)	UFC 291	July 29, 2023	1	2:39	Salt Lake City, Utah, United States	
Loss	16–6	Sean Brady	Decision (unanimous)	UFC Fight Night: Vieira vs. Tate	November 20, 2021	3	5:00	Las Vegas, Nevada, United States	
Loss	16–5	Vicente Luque	Submission (brabo choke)	UFC 265	August 7, 2021	1	3:25	Houston, Texas, United States	
Win	16–4	Neil Magny	Decision (unanimous)	UFC on ESPN: Chiesa vs. Magny	January 20, 2021	5	5:00	Abu Dhabi, United Arab Emirates	
Win	15–4	Rafael dos Anjos	Decision (unanimous)	UFC Fight Night: Blaydes vs. dos Santos	January 25, 2020	3	5:00	Raleigh, North Carolina, United States	
Win	14–4	Diego Sanchez	Decision (unanimous)	UFC 239	July 6, 2019	3	5:00	Las Vegas, Nevada, United States	
Win	13–4	Carlos Condit	Submission (kimura)	UFC 232	December 29, 2018	2	0:56	Inglewood, California, United States	Return to Welterweight.
Loss	12–4	Anthony Pettis	Submission (triangle armbar)	UFC 226	July 7, 2018	2	0:52	Las Vegas, Nevada, United States	Catchweight (157.5 lb) bout; Chiesa missed weight.
Loss	12–3	Kevin Lee	Technical Submission (rear-naked choke)	UFC Fight Night: Chiesa vs. Lee	June 25, 2017	1	4:37	Oklahoma City, Oklahoma, United States	
Win	12–2	Beneil Dariush	Submission (rear-naked choke)	UFC on Fox: Teixeira vs. Evans	April 16, 2016	2	1:20	Tampa, Florida, United States	Performance of the Night.
Win	11–2	Jim Miller	Submission (rear-naked choke)	UFC Fight Night: Namajunas vs. VanZant	December 10, 2015	2	2:57	Las Vegas, Nevada, United States	Fight of the Night.
Win	10–2	Mitch Clarke	Decision (unanimous)	UFC Fight Night: Mendes vs. Lamas	April 4, 2015	3	5:00	Fairfax, Virginia, United States	
Loss	9–2	Joe Lauzon	TKO (doctor stoppage)	UFC Fight Night: Jacaré vs. Mousasi	September 5, 2014	2	2:14	Mashantucket, Connecticut, United States	Fight of the Night.
Win	9–1	Francisco Trinaldo	Decision (unanimous)	UFC 173	May 24, 2014	3	5:00	Las Vegas, Nevada, United States	
Win	8–1	Colton Smith	Submission (rear-naked choke)	UFC: Fight for the Troops 3	November 6, 2013	2	1:41	Fort Campbell, Kentucky, United States	Submission of the Night.
Loss	7–1	Jorge Masvidal	Submission (brabo choke)	UFC on Fox: Johnson vs. Moraga	July 27, 2013	2	4:59	Seattle, Washington, United States	
Win	7–0	Anton Kuivanen	Submission (rear-naked choke)	UFC 157	February 23, 2013	2	2:29	Anaheim, California, United States	
Win	6–0	Al Iaquinta	Technical Submission (rear-naked choke)	The Ultimate Fighter: Live Finale	June 1, 2012	1	2:47	Las Vegas, Nevada, United States	Won The Ultimate Fighter 15 Lightweight Tournament. Submission of the Night.
Win	5–0	Darrell Fenner	Submission (rear-naked choke)	CageSport 16	October 1, 2011	1	0:45	Tacoma, Washington, United States	Welterweight bout.
Win	4–0	Matt Coble	Submission (rear-naked choke)	Lords of the Cage 6	July 16, 2011	1	2:13	Manson, Washington, United States	
Win	3–0	Evian Rodriguez	Submission (rear-naked choke)	Lords of the Cage 5	April 28, 2011	1	1:03	Airway Heights, Washington, United States	
Win	2–0	Darcy James	Submission (brabo choke)	Battlefield Fight League 7	March 26, 2011	1	0:53	Nanaimo, British Columbia, Canada	Lightweight debut.
Win	1–0	Andy Paves	Decision (unanimous)	Rumble on the Ridge 14	October 20, 2010	3	5:00	Snoqualmie, Washington, United States	Welterweight debut.

Exhibition record breakdown		
4 matches	4 wins	0 losses
By knockout	2	0
By submission	1	0
By decision	1	0

Res.	Record	Opponent	Method	Event	Date	Round	Time	Location	Notes
Win	4–0	James Vick	TKO (punches)	The Ultimate Fighter: Live	May 25, 2012 (Live airdate)	2	1:55	Las Vegas, Nevada, United States	The Ultimate Fighter 15 Semi-Final round.
Win	3–0	Justin Lawrence	TKO (punches)	The Ultimate Fighter: Live	May 11, 2012 (Live airdate)	3	1:02	Las Vegas, Nevada, United States	The Ultimate Fighter 15 Quarter-Final round.
Win	2–0	Jeremy Larsen	Decision (unanimous)	The Ultimate Fighter: Live	April 6, 2012 (Live airdate)	2	5:00	Las Vegas, Nevada, United States	The Ultimate Fighter 15 Preliminary round.
Win	1–0	Johnavan Vistante	Submission (rear-naked choke)	The Ultimate Fighter: Live	March 9, 2012 (Live airdate)	1	2:05	Las Vegas, Nevada, United States	The Ultimate Fighter 15 Elimination round.

== See also ==
- List of male mixed martial artists
