= UFC on FX: Belfort vs. Rockhold =

UFC mixed martial arts event in 2013

- The poster for UFC on FX: Belfort vs. Rockhold
- Promotion: Ultimate Fighting Championship
- Date: May 18, 2013
- Venue: Arena Jaraguá
- City: Jaraguá do Sul, Brazil
- Attendance: 7,642

Event chronology
| UFC 159: Jones vs. Sonnen | UFC on FX: Belfort vs. Rockhold | UFC 160: Velasquez vs. Bigfoot 2 |

UFC on FX: Belfort vs. Rockhold (also known as UFC on FX 8) was a mixed martial arts event held on May 18, 2013, at the Arena Jaraguá in Jaraguá do Sul, Brazil. The event was broadcast live on FUEL TV and FX.

== Background ==
The event was headlined by a middleweight bout between perennial multi-divisional contender Vitor Belfort and the final Strikeforce Middleweight Champion and promotional newcomer and future UFC Middleweight Champion Luke Rockhold.

Manvel Gamburyan was expected to face Hacran Dias at the event. However, Gamburyan was forced to pull out of the bout citing an injury and was replaced by Nik Lentz.

Marcos Vinícius was expected to face Iuri Alcântara at the event. However, Vinicius was forced out of the bout citing an injury and was replaced by promotional newcomer Iliarde Santos

Cezar Ferreira was originally scheduled to face CB Dollaway. However, on April 1, it was revealed that Dollaway had to withdraw from the bout due to injury and he was replaced by Chris Camozzi. Then on April 7, it was confirmed that Ferreira had pulled out of the fight as well, citing an injury and was replaced by Rafael Natal.

Costas Philippou had to withdraw from his fight against Ronaldo Souza, after suffering a cut above his eye, and was replaced by Chris Camozzi. Camozzi's scheduled opponent Rafael Natal instead faced promotional newcomer João Zeferino.

Paulo Thiago was originally expected to face Lance Benoist. However, on April 20, it was announced that Benoist had to pull out of the bout due to an injury and was replaced by UFC newcomer Michel Prazeres.

== Results ==
Main card (FX)
| Weight class | | | | Method | Round | Time | Notes |
|---|---|---|---|---|---|---|---|
| Middleweight | Vitor Belfort | def. | Luke Rockhold | KO (spinning heel kick and punches) | 1 | 2:32 |
| Middleweight | Ronaldo Souza | def. | Chris Camozzi | Technical Submission (arm-triangle choke) | 1 | 3:37 |
| Lightweight | Rafael dos Anjos | def. | Evan Dunham | Decision (unanimous) (29–28, 29–28, 29–28) | 3 | 5:00 |
| Middleweight | Rafael Natal | def. | João Zeferino | Decision (unanimous) (30–27, 29–28, 29–28) | 3 | 5:00 |
Preliminary card (Fuel TV)
| Featherweight | Nik Lentz | def. | Hacran Dias | Decision (unanimous) (28–27, 29–28, 29–28) | 3 | 5:00 |
| Lightweight | Francisco Trinaldo | def. | Mike Rio | Submission (arm-triangle choke) | 1 | 3:08 |
| Lightweight | Gleison Tibau | def. | John Cholish | Submission (guillotine choke) | 2 | 2:34 |
| Welterweight | Paulo Thiago | def. | Michel Prazeres | Decision (unanimous) (29–28, 29–28, 29–28) | 3 | 5:00 |
| Bantamweight | Iuri Alcântara | def. | Iliarde Santos | TKO (punches) | 1 | 2:31 |
| Light Heavyweight | Fabio Maldonado | def. | Roger Hollett | Decision (unanimous) (29–27, 29–28, 29–27) | 3 | 5:00 |
Preliminary card (Facebook)
| Flyweight | John Lineker | def. | Azamat Gashimov | TKO (punches) | 2 | 1:07 | (Note: Gashimov had 1 point deducted in round 1 for grabbing the cage.) |
| Flyweight | Jussier Formiga | def. | Chris Cariaso | Decision (unanimous) (29–28, 29–28, 29–28) | 3 | 5:00 |
| Lightweight | Lucas Martins | def. | Jeremy Larsen | KO (punch) | 3 | 0:13 |

== Bonus awards ==
The following fighters received $50,000 bonuses.

- Fight of the Night: Lucas Martins vs. Jeremy Larsen
- Knockout of the Night: Vitor Belfort
- Submission of the Night: Ronaldo Souza

== See also ==
- List of UFC events
- 2013 in UFC
