= Jeremy Larsen =

American mixed martial arts fighter

- Born: May 18, 1984 (age 42); Tucson, Arizona, United States
- Nationality: American
- Height: 5 ft 10 in (1.78 m)
- Weight: 145 lb (66 kg; 10.4 st)
- Division: Featherweight (145 lb); Lightweight (155 lb)
- Reach: 70.0 in (178 cm)
- Fighting out of: Phoenix, Arizona, United States
- Team: Arizona Combat Sports
- Years active: 2006–2007, 2009–present

Mixed martial arts record
- Total: 14
- Wins: 8
- By knockout: 2
- By submission: 3
- By decision: 3
- Losses: 5
- By knockout: 3
- By submission: 1
- By decision: 1
- No contests: 1

Other information
- Mixed martial arts record from Sherdog

Jeremy Larsen (born May 18, 1984) is an American mixed martial artist, who formerly competed in the Featherweight division of the Ultimate Fighting Championship.

== Mixed martial arts career ==
=== Early career ===
Larsen started his professional career in 2006. He fought mainly for Arizona-based promotion Rage in the Cage.

In February 2012, Larsen was announced as a cast member of The Ultimate Fighter: Live.

=== The Ultimate Fighter ===
Larsen defeated Jeff Smith during the entry round via unanimous decision. Following his win in the elimination round, Larsen was medically suspended by the Nevada State Athletic Commission (NSAC) due to a cut on his head. Despite the suspension, Larsen was able to enter the house, being the last pick of Team Cruz.

In episode 5, Larsen faced Michael Chiesa and lost via unanimous decision after two rounds.

=== Ultimate Fighting Championship ===
Larsen made his promotional debut against fellow TUF 15 competitor Joe Proctor on June 1, 2012, at The Ultimate Fighter 15 Finale. He lost via TKO early in the first round.

Larsen next faced Lucas Martins on May 18, 2013, at UFC on FX: Belfort vs. Rockhold. Despite being able to damage Martins significantly in the first two rounds, Martins knocked Larsen early in the third round. The performance earned both participants Fight of the Night honors.

Larsen was expected to face Matt Grice on October 19, 2013, at UFC 166. However, Grice was forced out of the bout after sustaining serious injuries in a car accident in his home state of Oklahoma. He was rescheduled to face Charles Oliveira at the same event, but Oliveira was also removed from the card due to injury. Larsen then faced short-notice replacement and promotional newcomer Andre Fili. He was defeated via TKO in the second round, and was subsequently released from the promotion shortly after.

== Championships and accomplishments ==
=== Mixed martial arts ===
- Ultimate Fighting Championship
  - Fight of the Night (one time) vs. Lucas Martins

== Mixed martial arts record ==
Professional record breakdown
14 matches	8 wins	5 losses
By knockout	2	3
By submission	3	1
By decision	3	1
No contests	1	

Res.	Record	Opponent	Method	Event	Date	Round	Time	Location	Notes
Loss	8–5 (1)	Andre Fili	TKO (punches)	UFC 166	October 19, 2013	2	0:53	Houston, Texas, United States	148.5 catchweight bout; Fili missed weight.
Loss	8–4 (1)	Lucas Martins	KO (punch)	UFC on FX: Belfort vs. Rockhold	May 18, 2013	3	0:13	Jaraguá do Sul, Santa Catarina, Brazil	Fight of the Night.
Loss	8–3 (1)	Joe Proctor	TKO (knee and punches)	The Ultimate Fighter 15 Finale	June 1, 2012	1	1:59	Las Vegas, Nevada, United States	
Win	8–2 (1)	Jeff Fletcher	Decision (unanimous)	TCF: Rumble at the Ranch 2	November 5, 2011	3	5:00	Phoenix, Arizona, United States	
Win	7–2 (1)	Sammy Ciurdar	Decision (unanimous)	TCF: Dawn of Champions	July 30, 2011	3	5:00	Phoenix, Arizona, United States	
Loss	6–2 (1)	Efraín Escudero	Submission (armbar)	Rage in the Cage 148	January 29, 2011	3	3:21	Chandler, Arizona, United States	
Win	6–1 (1)	Victor Meza	Decision (unanimous)	Rage in the Cage 142	June 26, 2010	3	3:00	Chandler, Arizona, United States	
Win	5–1 (1)	Tim Holden	TKO (punches)	Rage in the Cage 139	February 13, 2010	1	0:55	Tucson, Arizona, United States	
NC	4–1 (1)	Gabriel Casillas	No contest	Rage in the Cage 134	September 11, 2009	2	3:00	Tucson, Arizona, United States	
Win	4–1	Jeff Horlacher	TKO (punches)	AG: Extreme Beat Down	April 11, 2009	1	4:44	Phoenix, Arizona, United States	
Loss	3–1	Edgar García	Decision (unanimous)	Cage Supremacy 3	December 8, 2007	3	5:00	Tucson, Arizona, United States	
Win	3–0	Omur Cor	Submission (rear-naked choke)	Cage Supremacy 2	July 22, 2007	1	2:26	Tucson, Arizona, United States	
Win	2–0	Eric Schneider	Submission (guillotine choke)	Rage in the Cage 96	June 15, 2007	3	0:23	Tucson, Arizona, United States	
Win	1–0	Chance Butts	Submission (guillotine choke)	Rage in the Cage 88: Veteran's Day Rumble	November 11, 2006	2	1:00	Tucson, Arizona, United States	
