= UFC Fight Night: Mendes vs. Lamas =

UFC mixed martial arts event in 2015

- The poster for UFC Fight Night: Mendes vs. Lamas
- Promotion: Ultimate Fighting Championship
- Date: April 4, 2015
- Venue: Patriot Center
- City: Fairfax, Virginia
- Attendance: 5,417
- Total gate: $545,604

Event chronology
UFC Fight Night: Maia vs. LaFlare	UFC Fight Night: Mendes vs. Lamas	UFC Fight Night: Gonzaga vs. Cro Cop 2

UFC Fight Night: Mendes vs. Lamas (also known as UFC Fight Night 63) was a mixed martial arts event held on April 4, 2015, at the Patriot Center in Fairfax, Virginia.

== Background ==
The event was the third that the organization hosted at the venue and the first since 2012. The preliminary portion of the card began at 11 a.m. ET / 8 a.m. PT, with the main card starting at 1:00 p.m. ET / 10:00 a.m. PT, a rare time slot for UFC events held in North America.

The event was headlined by a featherweight bout between former title challengers Chad Mendes and Ricardo Lamas.

Jorge Masvidal was briefly linked to a bout with Bobby Green at the event. However, shortly after the bout was announced by the UFC, Green pulled out of the bout citing a leg injury, and was replaced by former WEC & UFC Lightweight champion Benson Henderson Subsequently, Henderson was removed from the bout with Masvidal as he was tabbed as a replacement for Stephen Thompson to face Brandon Thatch in the event headliner on February 14, 2015, at UFC Fight Night 60. On February 2, Al Iaquinta was announced as Masvidal's new opponent.

Clint Hester was expected to face Luke Barnatt at this event. However, Hester pulled out of the fight in early March due to a foot injury. Subsequently, Barnett was pulled from the card entirely in favor of a matchup with Mark Muñoz in May at UFC Fight Night 66.

== Results ==
Main Card (Fox Sports 1)
Weight class				Method	Round	Time	Notes
Featherweight	Chad Mendes	def.	Ricardo Lamas	TKO (punches)	1	2:45
Lightweight	Al Iaquinta	def.	Jorge Masvidal	Decision (split) (29–28, 27–30, 29–28)	3	5:00
Lightweight	Michael Chiesa	def.	Mitch Clarke	Decision (unanimous) (29–26, 29–26, 29–28)	3	5:00
Women's Bantamweight	Julianna Peña	def.	Milana Dudieva	TKO (punches and elbows)	1	3:59
Featherweight	Clay Guida	def.	Robbie Peralta	Decision (unanimous) (30–27, 30–27, 30–27)	3	5:00
Lightweight	Dustin Poirier	def.	Carlos Diego Ferreira	KO (punches)	1	3:45
Preliminary Card (Fox Sports 1)
Women's Bantamweight	Liz Carmouche	def.	Lauren Murphy	Decision (unanimous) (29–28, 29–28, 29–28)	3	5:00
Lightweight	Alexander Yakovlev	def.	Gray Maynard	Decision (unanimous) (30–27, 29–28, 30–27)	3	5:00
Heavyweight	Timothy Johnson	def.	Shamil Abdurakhimov	TKO (punches)	1	4:57	(Note: Abdurakhimov was docked one point in the first round for grabbing the fence.)
Middleweight	Ron Stallings	def.	Justin Jones	Decision (unanimous) (29–28, 29–28, 30–27)	3	5:00

== Bonus awards ==
The following fighters were awarded $50,000 bonuses:

- Fight of the Night: None awarded
- Performance of the Night: Chad Mendes, Julianna Peña, Dustin Poirier, and Timothy Johnson

== Reported payout ==
The following is the reported payout to the fighters as reported to the Virginia Boxing, MMA and Wrestling Advisory Board. It does not include sponsor money or "locker room" bonuses often given by the UFC and also do not include the UFC's traditional "fight night" bonuses.

- Chad Mendes: $96,000 ($48,000 win bonus) def. Ricardo Lamas: $35,000
- Al Iaquinta: $46,000 ($23,000 win bonus) def. Jorge Masvidal: $51,000
- Michael Chiesa: $48,000 ($24,000 win bonus) def. Mitch Clarke: $12,000
- Julianna Peña: $30,000 ($15,000 win bonus) def. Milana Dudieva: $10,000
- Clay Guida: $100,000 ($50,000 win bonus) def. Robbie Peralta: $18,000
- Dustin Poirier: $68,000 ($34,000 win bonus) def. Carlos Diego Ferreira: $15,000
- Liz Carmouche: $34,000 ($17,000 win bonus) def. Lauren Murphy: $8,000
- Alexander Yakovlev: $16,000 ($8,000 win bonus) def. Gray Maynard: $48,000
- Timothy Johnson: $16,000 ($8,000 win bonus) def. Shamil Abdurahimov: $12,000
- Ron Stallings: $20,000 ($10,000 win bonus) def. Justin Jones: $8,000

== See also ==
- List of UFC events
- 2015 in UFC
