= Alex White (fighter) =

American mixed martial artist (born 1988)

- Born: Alex White; October 22, 1988 (age 37); Tuscumbia, Missouri, United States
- Other names: The Spartan
- Height: 6 ft 0 in (1.83 m)
- Weight: 155 lb (70 kg; 11.1 st)
- Division: Lightweight; Featherweight
- Reach: 71 in (180 cm)
- Style: Brazilian Jiu-Jitsu
- Stance: Orthodox
- Fighting out of: Farmington, Missouri, United States
- Rank: Purple belt in Brazilian Jiu-Jitsu
- Years active: 2010–present

Mixed martial arts record
- Total: 20
- Wins: 14
- By knockout: 6
- By submission: 5
- By decision: 3
- Losses: 6
- By knockout: 1
- By submission: 1
- By decision: 4

Other information
- Mixed martial arts record from Sherdog

Alexander Randle White (born October 22, 1988) is an American mixed martial artist who competed as a featherweight in the Ultimate Fighting Championship.

== Background ==
Born and raised Tuscumbia, Missouri, White was critically injured as a toddler when he mistakenly drank gasoline placed in a milk jug near other jugs that were filled with lemonade. The gasoline accident burned his vocal cords, damaged his hearing and contributed to a minor speech impediment. As a young adult, White was in and out of homelessness for a time before discovering combat sports: First, boxing, then mixed martial arts.

== Mixed martial arts career ==
=== Early career ===
White began his mixed martial arts career in 2009, compiling a 3-0 amateur record before turning professional the following year. Along the way he compiled an undefeated record on the regional circuit, competing mostly in his native Missouri before signing with the UFC in March 2014.

=== Ultimate Fighting Championship ===
White made his promotional debut on April 19, 2014, at UFC on Fox 11 against Estevan Payan, replacing an injured Mike Brown. He won his debut via first-round KO.

White faced Lucas Martins on July 16, 2014, at UFC Fight Night 45, again as a short notice replacement, filling in for an injured Jim Alers. He lost the back-and-forth fight via knockout due to punches in the third round.

White next faced Clay Collard on December 6, 2014, at UFC 181. He lost the fight via unanimous decision.

White was expected to face Mark Eddiva on May 16, 2015, at UFC Fight Night 66. However, on April 26, it was announced that White suffered an undisclosed injury and was forced out of the bout.

White faced Artem Lobov on February 2, 2016, at UFC Fight Night 82. He won the fight by unanimous decision.

White was expected to face Ryan Hall on July 13, 2016, at UFC Fight Night 91. However, the bout was scrapped on June 28 as White pulled out due to an undisclosed injury. In turn, Hall elected to fight on a different date rather than have the promotion find him a replacement.

White was tabbed as a short notice replacement and faced Anthony Rocco Martin in a lightweight bout on January 15, 2017, at UFC Fight Night 103. He lost the fight via unanimous decision.

White faced Mitch Clarke on September 9, 2017, at UFC 215. He won the fight via TKO in the second round.

White faced James Krause on January 14, 2018, at UFC Fight Night: Stephens vs. Choi. He lost the fight by unanimous decision.

White faced Jim Miller on September 8, 2018, at UFC 228. He lost the fight via submission in the first round.

White faced Dan Moret on March 9, 2019, at UFC Fight Night 146. He won the fight by unanimous decision.

White faced Rafael Fiziev on October 26, 2019, at UFC on ESPN+ 20. He lost the fight via unanimous decision.

In February 2020, White was released from the UFC.

=== Post UFC ===
In his first appearance after being released from the UFC, White faced Zack Davis at Cage of Honor 85 for the COH Welterweight title. He won the bout via TKO stoppage in the second round.

== Championships and achievements ==
=== Mixed martial arts ===
- Ultimate Fighting Championship
  - Performance of the Night (One time)
- Cage of Honor
  - COH Welterweight Championship (One time)

== Mixed martial arts record ==
Professional record breakdown
20 matches	14 wins	6 losses
By knockout	6	1
By submission	5	1
By decision	3	4

Res.	Record	Opponent	Method	Event	Date	Round	Time	Location	Notes
Win	14–6	Zack Davis	TKO (strikes)	Cage of Honor 85	March 12, 2022	2	1:48	Cape Girardeau, Missouri, United States	Won the COH Welterweight Championship. Welterweight debut.
Loss	13–6	Rafael Fiziev	Decision (unanimous)	UFC Fight Night: Maia vs. Askren	October 26, 2019	3	5:00	Kallang, Singapore	
Win	13–5	Dan Moret	Decision (unanimous)	UFC Fight Night: Lewis vs. dos Santos	March 9, 2019	3	5:00	Wichita, Kansas, United States	
Loss	12–5	Jim Miller	Submission (rear-naked choke)	UFC 228	September 8, 2018	1	1:29	Dallas, Texas, United States	
Loss	12–4	James Krause	Decision (unanimous)	UFC Fight Night: Stephens vs. Choi	January 14, 2018	3	5:00	St. Louis, Missouri, United States	
Win	12–3	Mitch Clarke	TKO (punches)	UFC 215	September 9, 2017	2	4:36	Edmonton, Alberta, Canada	
Loss	11–3	Anthony Rocco Martin	Decision (unanimous)	UFC Fight Night: Rodríguez vs. Penn	January 15, 2017	3	5:00	Phoenix, Arizona, United States	Return to Lightweight.
Win	11–2	Artem Lobov	Decision (unanimous)	UFC Fight Night: Hendricks vs. Thompson	February 6, 2016	3	5:00	Las Vegas, Nevada, United States	
Loss	10–2	Clay Collard	Decision (unanimous)	UFC 181	December 6, 2014	3	5:00	Las Vegas, Nevada, United States	
Loss	10–1	Lucas Martins	KO (punches)	UFC Fight Night: Cowboy vs. Miller	July 16, 2014	3	2:08	Atlantic City, New Jersey, United States	
Win	10–0	Estevan Payan	KO (punches)	UFC on Fox: Werdum vs. Browne	April 19, 2014	1	1:28	Orlando, Florida, United States	Performance of the Night.
Win	9–0	Adam Rider	Submission (triangle choke)	Rumble Time Promotions: Rumble at the Chase	January 18, 2014	1	1:58	St. Louis, Missouri, United States	
Win	8–0	Will Shutt	TKO (punches)	Cage Fighting Events	November 1, 2013	1	2:32	St. Charles, Missouri, United States	Catchweight (150 lb) bout.
Win	7–0	Roy Babcock	TKO (corner stoppage)	Titan Fighting Championship 26	August 30, 2013	2	5:00	Kansas City, Missouri, United States	
Win	6–0	Adam Ward	Decision (split)	Cage Fighting Events	April 5, 2013	3	5:00	St. Charles, Missouri, United States	
Win	5–0	Charon Spain	TKO (retirement)	Rumble Time Promotions	October 26, 2012	2	5:00	St. Charles, Missouri, United States	
Win	4–0	Javon Wright	Submission (rear-naked choke)	Cage Championships 39	August 18, 2012	2	3:15	Sullivan, Missouri, United States	
Win	3–0	Mark Nguyen	Submission (armbar)	Cage Championships 38	June 23, 2012	1	3:47	Sullivan, Missouri, United States	Featherweight debut.
Win	2–0	Greg Wilson Jr.	Submission (rear-naked choke)	Fight Me MMA	April 13, 2012	2	2:05	St. Charles, Missouri, United States	
Win	1–0	Pietro Falco	Submission (guillotine choke)	La Resa dei Conti 12	November 19, 2010	1	0:00	Livorno, Italy	Lightweight debut.

== See also ==
- List of current UFC fighters
- List of male mixed martial artists
