= Jim Miller (fighter) =

American mixed martial artist (born 1983)

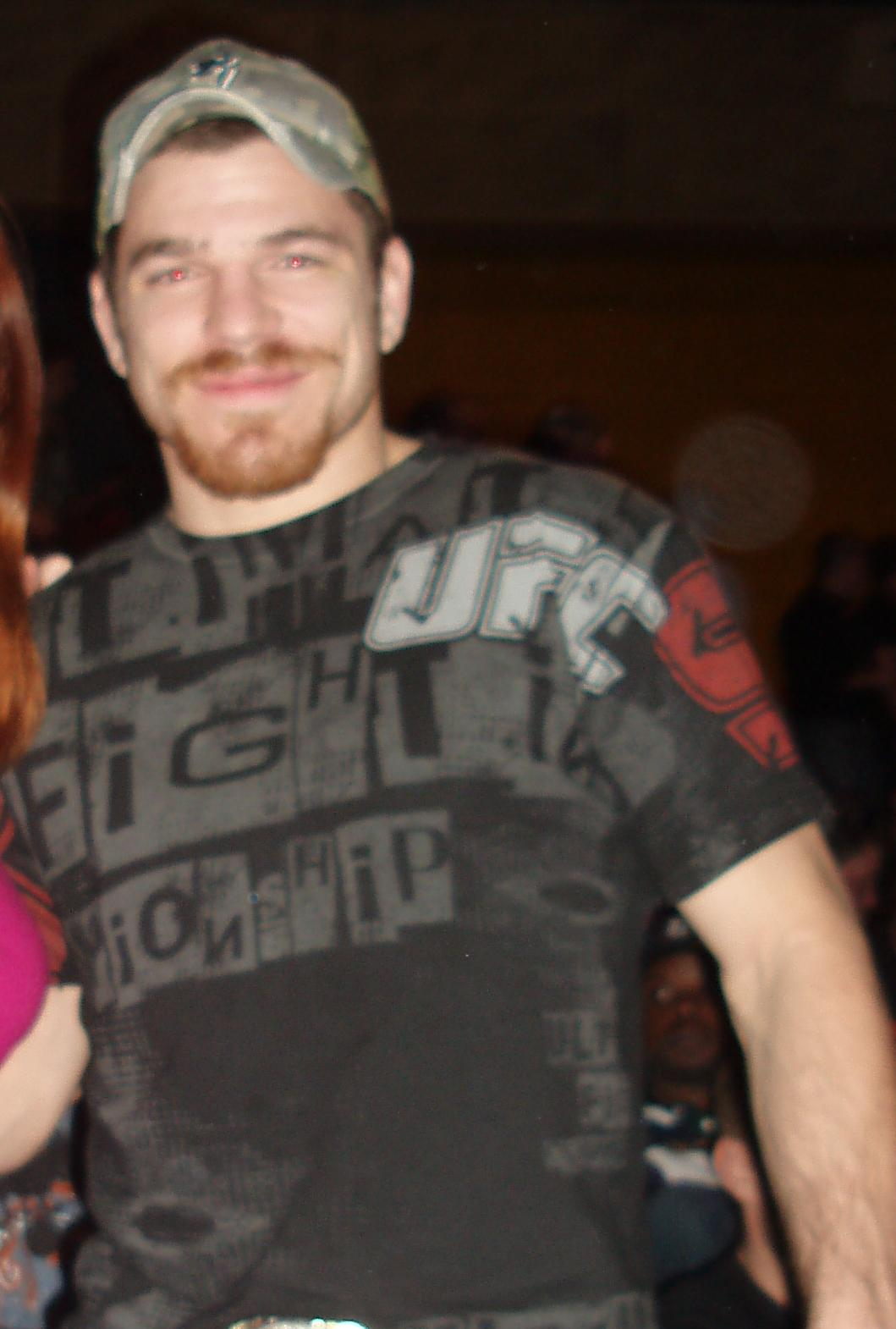
- Born: James Andrew Miller; August 30, 1983 (age 43); Sparta Township, New Jersey, U.S.
- Other names: A-10
- Height: 5 ft 8 in (173 cm)
- Weight: 155 lb (70 kg; 11 st 1 lb)
- Division: Lightweight; Welterweight
- Reach: 71 in (180 cm)
- Stance: Southpaw
- Fighting out of: Sparta Township, New Jersey, U.S.
- Team: AMA Fight Club (2007–2014); Miller Brothers MMA (2014–present)
- Trainer: Brian McLaughlin
- Rank: Black belt in Brazilian Jiu-Jitsu under Jamie Cruz
- Wrestling: NCAA Division I Wrestling
- Years active: 2005–present

Mixed martial arts record
- Total: 60
- Wins: 39
- By knockout: 7
- By submission: 22
- By decision: 10
- Losses: 20
- By knockout: 3
- By submission: 3
- By decision: 14
- No contests: 1

Other information
- University: Virginia Tech
- Notable relatives: Dan Miller (brother)
- Notable school: Sparta High School
- Website: Official UFC Profile https://www.millerbrothersmma.com/
- Mixed martial arts record from Sherdog

James Andrew Miller (born August 30, 1983) is an American professional mixed martial artist. He currently competes in the Lightweight division of the Ultimate Fighting Championship (UFC), where he holds the UFC records for most bouts (48), most wins (28), and most submission attempts (52) in the promotion's history. Within the lightweight division, he also owns the records for most wins (25), most finishes (18), most submission wins (12), and most submission attempts (49). He is also the younger brother of former UFC fighter Dan Miller.

== Early life and education ==
Born and raised in Sparta Township, New Jersey and the youngest of three brothers, Miller started wrestling at the age of four. He competed in wrestling in high school at Sparta High School, as well as one year of collegiate wrestling at Virginia Tech. Miller had not originally planned on wrestling at Virginia Tech, but his desire to compete again grew and he made the team as a walk-on later into the season. However, Miller did not continue competing for the school because of "disagreements" with the coaching staff and the program. He currently holds a black belt in Brazilian jiu-jitsu under Jamie Cruz. Miller began training in mixed martial arts in 2005 at Planet Jiu-Jitsu in Sparta, New Jersey with his brother Dan Miller.

== Mixed martial arts career ==
=== Early career ===
Miller had his first professional fight on November 19, 2005, against Eddie Fyvie at Reality Fighting 10. Miller controlled the fight and earned a unanimous decision. Miller earned two more victories in the promotion over Kevin Roddy and Joe Andujar, both via the first-round submission. The quick victories earned Miller a title shot and he fought Muhsin Corbbrey for the Reality Fighting Lightweight Championship. Miller mounted Corrbrey in the second round and battered his opponent before securing an armbar for the victory. In his first title defense, Miller took on future UFC Lightweight Champion Frankie Edgar at Reality Fighting 14. Edgar controlled the fight, but Miller secured a tight guillotine late in the final round. Edgar fought through the choke to earn the unanimous decision.

In the weeks prior to Reality Fighting 14, Planet Jiu-Jitsu closed down. Miller began training at AMA Fight Club in Whippany, New Jersey with his brother Dan in January 2007.

Miller debuted with the Cage Fury Fighting Championships in a Lightweight Championship bout on April 13, 2007, against Evo Fight Club's Al Buck. Jim fought on the same card as his brother for the first time since Reality Fighting XII and both were victorious. Miller and Buck squared off but were forced to separate early after an accidental knee to Buck's groin. When the fight resumed, Miller began working for a takedown and after escaping an attempted guillotine, secured a slam, from which he quickly attained the mount and then the back, sinking in a rear-naked choke for the win.

Miller defended his title for the first time at Cage Fury Fighting Championships 5 against Atlantic City MMA's Anthony Morrison. Morrison delivered some big slams early, but Miller worked through a chain of submissions before securing the victory by triangle choke at 4:56 of the first round to retain his title.

Miller's second defense was scheduled for the Cage Fury Fighting Championships 6 card, where he was to face King of the Cage Champion Clay French, but the event was canceled a week prior to the event when a primary investor dropped out.

=== Ultimate Fighting Championship ===
==== 2008 ====
Jim and his brother Dan signed with the UFC in July 2008. Miller made his debut at UFC 89 where he defeated David Baron in the third round. This win earned Miller his first Submission of the Night bonus award.

Miller next acted as a late replacement for Frankie Edgar against Matt Wiman at UFC: Fight for the Troops. Miller dominated Wiman for three rounds, winning via unanimous decision (30-27, 30–27, 30–26). The fight also earned both fighters the Fight of the Night bonus award.

==== 2009 ====
Miller next faced Gray Maynard on March 7, 2009, at UFC 96. He lost the fight via unanimous decision.

Miller next faced The Ultimate Fighter winner Mac Danzig on July 11, 2009, at UFC 100, and won in a one-sided unanimous decision.

Miller was scheduled to face Thiago Tavares on September 19, 2009, at UFC 103, but Tavares was forced to drop out due to a knee injury suffered while training. UFC newcomer Steve Lopez stepped in to replace Tavares. Both fighters exchanged competitively on the feet, but Miller won after Lopez injured his shoulder in round two.

==== 2010 ====
Miller was expected to face Tyson Griffin on January 2, 2010, at UFC 108, but an injury forced Griffin off the card. Sean Sherk agreed to step up from the undercard and fight Miller, rather than his original opponent in Rafaello Oliveira. However, Sherk pulled out of the fight because of a cut that required many stitches; returning veteran Duane Ludwig was named as Sherk's replacement. Miller looked comfortable and sharp on his feet exchanging with the seasoned striker in Ludwig and scored a knockdown halfway through the round with a fast combination. Miller swarmed to secure an armbar, winning by submission at 2:31 of the first round.

Miller faced Mark Bocek on March 27, 2010, at UFC 111. After three closely contested rounds, Miller was awarded the unanimous decision win.

Miller fought Gleison Tibau at UFC Fight Night 22 winning via unanimous decision. Miller was able to use his improved footwork to outstrike Tibau and stuff most of his takedowns.

Miller faced touted prospect Charles Oliveira on December 11, 2010, at UFC 124. Miller defeated Oliveira via a first round kneebar to extend his winning streak to six and earning the Submission of the Night bonus.

==== 2011 ====
Miller defeated WEC import, Kamal Shalorus on March 19, 2011, at UFC 128. Miller won the fight via TKO in the third round, after landing an uppercut and knee to Shalorus's face.

Miller faced Benson Henderson on August 14, 2011, at UFC on Versus 5. He lost the fight via unanimous decision (30-27, 29–28, 30–26). He later revealed that he was battling kidney infection and mononucleosis when cutting weight for the fight.

==== 2012 ====
On January 20, 2012, he faced Melvin Guillard at UFC on FX 1. After being rocked early by a knee and punches from Guillard in the first round, Miller was able to get the fight to the ground and submit Guillard with a rear naked choke. This win earned Miller his third Submission of the Night bonus award.

Miller next faced Nate Diaz on May 5, 2012, in the main event on UFC on Fox 3. He lost the fight via submission, for the first time in his professional career, in the second round due to a guillotine choke.

Miller faced Joe Lauzon on December 29, 2012, at UFC 155, replacing an injured Gray Maynard. He won the fight via unanimous decision, with the performance earning both participants Fight of the Night honors. The win also gave Miller the most all-time wins in UFC lightweight history.

==== 2013 ====
Miller faced Pat Healy on April 27, 2013, at UFC 159. He lost the back-and-forth fight by submission in the third round. Despite the loss, the bout earned Miller his third - and second consecutive - Fight of the Night bonus. Healy, however, subsequently tested positive for marijuana and the result of the fight was overturned to a No Contest.

Miller faced Fabrício Camões at UFC 168 in on December 28, 2013. The two were originally scheduled to meet in 2008 at IFL 22 but the bout was scrapped after Camões was forced to withdraw due to injury. Miller locked in an armbar for the submission victory at 3:42 of the first round.

==== 2014 ====
Miller was expected to face Bobby Green on April 26, 2014, at UFC 172. However, in the week leading up to the event, Green pulled out of the bout citing an injury and was replaced by Yancy Medeiros. Miller won the fight via submission in the first round.

Miller faced Donald Cerrone on July 16, 2014, at UFC Fight Night 45. After a back and forth first round, Miller was defeated via second-round knockout.

==== 2015 ====
Miller was expected to face Paul Felder on April 18, 2015, at UFC on Fox 15. However, Felder was forced to pull out of the event due to a knee injury and was replaced by Beneil Dariush. Miller lost the fight by unanimous decision.

Miller faced Danny Castillo on July 25, 2015, at UFC on Fox 16, replacing Rustam Khabilov who was pulled from the card with alleged visa issues. He won the fight by split decision.

Miller faced Michael Chiesa on December 10, 2015, at UFC Fight Night 80. He lost the bout via submission in the second round. Despite the loss, Miller was awarded his fourth Fight of the Night bonus award.

==== 2016 ====
Miller faced Diego Sanchez on March 5, 2016, at UFC 196. He lost the fight by unanimous decision.

Miller next faced former Pride FC Lightweight Champion Takanori Gomi on July 9, 2016, at UFC 200. He won the fight via TKO in the first round.

After sustaining virtually no damage during his previous fight, Miller was quickly rescheduled to rematch Joe Lauzon on August 27, 2016, at UFC on Fox 21. He won the back-and-forth fight via split decision. The win also earned Miller his fifth Fight of the Night bonus award.

Miller next faced Thiago Alves on November 12, 2016, at UFC 205. At the weigh-ins, Alves missed weight by six pounds, weighing in at 162.6 lbs. Miller, who was already on weight, had to rehydrate to keep their weight difference within 7 pounds. Because of that, he came in at 157.6 lbs and the bout proceeded at catchweight. New York State Athletic Commission and UFC officials indicated that Alves must not weigh more than 173 lbs the day of the fight or the fight would be canceled. As a result, Alves was fined 20% of his fight purse, which went to Miller. He won the fight by unanimous decision.

==== 2017 ====
Miller faced Dustin Poirier on February 11, 2017, at UFC 208. He lost the back-and-forth fight by majority decision. Both participants earned Fight of the Night honors. Miller faced Anthony Pettis on July 8, 2017, at UFC 213. He lost the fight by unanimous decision.

Miller faced Anthony Pettis on July 8, 2017, at UFC 213. About a week before the fight, he debuted the first nickname of his fighting career, "A-10," chosen as an homage to the Fairchild Republic A-10 Thunderbolt II. He lost the fight by unanimous decision.

Miller faced Francisco Trinaldo on October 28, 2017, at UFC Fight Night 119. He lost the fight by unanimous decision.

==== 2018 ====
Miller faced Dan Hooker on April 21, 2018, at UFC Fight Night 128. He lost the fight via knockout in the first round.

Miller faced Alex White on September 8, 2018, at UFC 228. He won the fight via submission in the first round. Miller locked in a rear-naked choke after dropping White with punches. In this bout, Miller subsequently became the first UFC fighter to both reach 30 fights in the organization and win 17 fights in its Lightweight division.

Miller faced Charles Oliveira in a rematch on December 15, 2018, at UFC on Fox 31. He lost the fight via a rear-naked choke submission early in the first round.

==== 2019 ====
Miller faced Jason Gonzalez on April 27, 2019, at UFC Fight Night 150. He won the fight via a rear-naked choke submission in the first round. The win also earned Miller his first Performance of the Night bonus award.

Miller faced Clay Guida on August 3, 2019, at UFC on ESPN 5. He won the fight via a technical submission due to a guillotine choke in the first minute of the first round.

==== 2020 ====
Miller faced Scott Holtzman on February 15, 2020, at UFC Fight Night 167. He lost the back-and-forth fight by unanimous decision. The bout also earned Miller his seventh Fight of the Night bonus award.

Miller faced to Roosevelt Roberts on June 20, 2020, at UFC on ESPN 11. He won the fight via verbal submission due to an armbar at 2:25 of the first round. This win earned him the Performance of the Night award.

Miller faced Vinc Pichel at UFC 252 on August 15, 2020. He lost the fight by unanimous decision.

==== 2021 ====
Miller was expected to face Bobby Green on February 13, 2021, at UFC 258. However the fight was cancelled when Green collapsed after the weigh-ins.

Miller faced Joe Solecki on April 10, 2021, at UFC on ABC 2. He lost the fight by unanimous decision.

Miller was scheduled to face Nikolas Motta on September 18, 2021, at UFC Fight Night 192. However, a week before the event, Miller tested positive for COVID-19 and was pulled from the event. This marked the first time Miller pulled out of a fight in his then 49-fight career.

Miller faced Erick Gonzalez on October 16, 2021 UFC Fight Night 195. He won the fight via knockout early in round two. This win earned him the Performance of the Night award.

==== 2022 ====
The bout between Miller and Nikolas Motta eventually took place at UFC Fight Night 201 on February 19, 2022. Miller won the fight via TKO in the second round. With this win, Miller tied Donald Cerrone for the most wins in UFC history with twenty-three (23).

Miller was rebooked to face Bobby Green for the third time on July 2, 2022, at UFC 276. A week before the event, Green was forced to pull out of the bout and Miller was instead booked at welterweight in a rematch against Donald Cerrone. Miller won the fight in the second round after submitting Cerrone with a guillotine choke. With this win Miller set the record for the most wins in UFC history.

==== 2023 ====
Miller was scheduled to face Gabriel Benítez on February 18, 2023, at UFC Fight Night 219. However, Benítez withdrew due to an undisclosed reason and was replaced by Alexander Hernandez. He lost the fight via unanimous decision.

Miller was scheduled to face Ľudovít Klein on June 3, 2023, at UFC on ESPN 46. However, Klein pulled out on May 19 due to illness and was replaced by Jared Gordon. In turn, Gordon was pulled from the bout on the week of the event after not being medically cleared and was replaced by promotional newcomer Jesse Butler. Miller won the fight by knockout 23 seconds into the first round, thus extending his winning record to 25 wins. The win also earned Miller his fourth Performance of the Night bonus award.

==== 2024 ====
Miller faced Gabriel Benítez on January 13, 2024, at UFC Fight Night 234, and won his 26th UFC bout in the third round by face crank submission, which extended the UFC record for most wins. This fight earned him another Performance of the Night award.

Miller was booked for a 3rd time against Bobby Green, who by then changed his name to King Green on April 13, 2024, at UFC 300. He lost the fight via unanimous decision. With this bout, Miller became the only UFC fighter to have fought on UFC 100, UFC 200 and UFC 300.

Miller faced Damon Jackson on November 16, 2024, at UFC 309. He won his 27th UFC bout in the first round by guillotine choke submission, further extending the UFC record for most wins.

==== 2025 ====
Miller faced Chase Hooper on April 12, 2025 at UFC 314. He lost the fight by unanimous decision.

==== 2026 ====
Miller faced Jared Gordon on May 9, 2026 at UFC 328. He won the fight via a guillotine choke in round one. This fight earned him a $100,000 Performance of the Night award.

Miller faced Terrance McKinney on November 14, 2026 at UFC 334. At the weigh-ins, McKinney weighed in at 160.2 pounds, 4.2 pounds over the lightweight non-title fight limit. The fight proceeded at catchweight and McKinney was fined 30 percent of his individual purse which went to Miller. Miller lost the fight by knockout in the first round.

== Personal life ==
Jim was married in 2008. The couple has four children, with their first child born in June 2010. Prior to their careers in mixed martial arts, Jim and his brother Dan worked in construction with their father. Since Spring 2013, Miller has been suffering from Lyme disease, which doctors were slow to diagnose. However, since his diagnosis, Miller has been able to alleviate the symptoms of the disease by changing his nutrition plan.

In a May 2026 interview, Miller disclosed that his 14‑year‑old son had battled and recovered from rhabdomyosarcoma, a rare pediatric cancer, following extensive treatment over the previous year.

== Championships and accomplishments ==
=== Mixed martial arts ===
- Ultimate Fighting Championship
  - Fight of the Night (Seven times) vs. Matt Wiman, Joe Lauzon (x2), Pat Healy, Michael Chiesa, Dustin Poirier, and Scott Holtzman
    - Tied (Joe Lauzon, Diego Sanchez & Max Holloway) for seventh most Fight of the Night bonuses in UFC history (7)
  - Performance of the Night (Six times) vs. Jason Gonzalez, Roosevelt Roberts, Erick Gonzalez, Jesse Butler, Gabriel Benítez and Jared Gordon
  - Submission of the Night (Three times) vs. David Baron, Charles Oliveira 1, and Melvin Guillard
    - Tied (Nate Diaz) for fourth most Post-Fight bonuses in UFC history (16)
    - Tied (Joe Lauzon & Charles Oliveira) for second most Post-Fight bonuses in UFC Lightweight division history (15) (behind Justin Gaethje)
  - Most wins in UFC history (28)
    - Most wins in UFC Lightweight division history (25)
    - Second most wins in Zuffa, LLC (UFC, Pride, WEC, Strikeforce) history (28) (behind Donald Cerrone)
  - Most bouts in UFC history (48)
    - Most bouts in UFC Lightweight division history (45)
    - Tied (Donald Cerrone) for most bouts in Zuffa, LLC (UFC, Pride, WEC, Strikeforce) history (48)
  - Second most finishes in UFC history (20) (behind Charles Oliveira)
    - Most finishes in UFC Lightweight division history (18)
    - Tied (Donald Cerrone & Wanderlei Silva) for third most finishes in Zuffa, LLC (UFC, Pride, WEC, Strikeforce) history (20) (behind Mirko Cro Cop & Charles Oliveira)
    - Tied (Vitor Belfort) for most first-round finishes in UFC history (13)
    - Most first-round finishes in UFC Lightweight division history (12)
  - Most submission wins in UFC Lightweight division history (12)
    - Most submission attempts in UFC history (52)
    - Most submission attempts in UFC Lightweight division history (49)
    - Tied (Nate Diaz) for most guillotine-choke submissions in UFC history (5)
    - Second most submission wins in UFC history (14) (behind Charles Oliveira)
  - Most fight time in UFC Lightweight division history (7:10:53)
    - Fourth most total fight time in UFC history (7:34:50)
  - Most decision bouts in UFC Lightweight division history (20)
    - Tied (Diego Sanchez) for third most decision bouts in UFC history (21)
  - Second most total strikes landed in UFC Lightweight division history (1751) (behind King Green)
    - Sixth most significant strikes landed in UFC Lightweight division history (1268)
  - Fourth most top-position time in UFC Lightweight division history (1:10:54)
  - Sixth most control time in UFC Lightweight division history (1:24:56)
  - Only fighter to have fought on UFC 100, UFC 200 and UFC 300
  - Tied (Clay Guida) for second most losses in UFC history (19) (behind Jeremy Stephens)
    - Tied (Jeremy Stephens) for most decision losses in UFC history (13)
  - UFC.com Awards
    - 2008: Ranked #7 Newcomer of the Year (Tied with Dan Miller)
    - 2010: Ranked #7 Fighter of the Year & Ranked #10 Submission of the Year vs. Charles Oliveira 1
    - 2012: Fight of the Year vs. Joe Lauzon 1
- United States Kickboxing Association
  - USKBA Welterweight Championship
- Cage Fury Fighting Championships
  - Cage Fury Fighting Championships Lightweight Championship (one time; former)
    - One successful title defense
- Reality Fighting
  - Reality Fighting Lightweight Championship (one time; former)
  - Reality Fighting Featherweight Championship (one time; former)
- MMA Junkie
  - 2019 April Submission of the Month vs. Jason Gonzalez
  - 2019 August Submission of the Month vs. Clay Guida
- Sherdog
  - 2012 All-Violence First Team
- MMA Mania
  - 2024 #5 Ranked Submission of the Year vs. Damon Jackson at UFC 309
- CBS Sports
  - 2017 #4 Ranked UFC Fight of the Year vs. Dustin Poirier

== Mixed martial arts record ==
Professional record breakdown
60 matches	39 wins	20 losses
By knockout	7	3
By submission	22	3
By decision	10	14
No contests	1	

Res.	Record	Opponent	Method	Event	Date	Round	Time	Location	Notes
Loss	39–20 (1)	Terrance McKinney	TKO (punches)	UFC 334	November 14, 2026	1	1:53	New York City, New York, United States	Catchweight (160.2 lb) bout; McKinney missed weight.
Win	39–19 (1)	Jared Gordon	Submission (guillotine choke)	UFC 328	May 9, 2026	1	3:29	Newark, New Jersey, United States	Extended the UFC record for most wins (28). Performance of the Night.
Loss	38–19 (1)	Chase Hooper	Decision (unanimous)	UFC 314	April 12, 2025	3	5:00	Miami, Florida, United States	
Win	38–18 (1)	Damon Jackson	Submission (guillotine choke)	UFC 309	November 16, 2024	1	2:44	New York City, New York, United States	
Loss	37–18 (1)	King Green	Decision (unanimous)	UFC 300	April 13, 2024	3	5:00	Las Vegas, Nevada, United States	
Win	37–17 (1)	Gabriel Benítez	Submission (face crank)	UFC Fight Night: Ankalaev vs. Walker 2	January 13, 2024	3	3:25	Las Vegas, Nevada, United States	Performance of the Night.
Win	36–17 (1)	Jesse Butler	KO (punch)	UFC on ESPN: Kara-France vs. Albazi	June 3, 2023	1	0:23	Las Vegas, Nevada, United States	Performance of the Night.
Loss	35–17 (1)	Alexander Hernandez	Decision (unanimous)	UFC Fight Night: Andrade vs. Blanchfield	February 18, 2023	3	5:00	Las Vegas, Nevada, United States	
Win	35–16 (1)	Donald Cerrone	Submission (guillotine choke)	UFC 276	July 2, 2022	2	1:32	Las Vegas, Nevada, United States	Welterweight bout. Broke the UFC record for most wins (24).
Win	34–16 (1)	Nikolas Motta	TKO (punches)	UFC Fight Night: Walker vs. Hill	February 19, 2022	2	1:58	Las Vegas, Nevada, United States	
Win	33–16 (1)	Erick Gonzalez	KO (punch)	UFC Fight Night: Ladd vs. Dumont	October 16, 2021	2	0:14	Las Vegas, Nevada, United States	Performance of the Night.
Loss	32–16 (1)	Joe Solecki	Decision (unanimous)	UFC on ABC: Vettori vs. Holland	April 10, 2021	3	5:00	Las Vegas, Nevada, United States	
Loss	32–15 (1)	Vinc Pichel	Decision (unanimous)	UFC 252	August 15, 2020	3	5:00	Las Vegas, Nevada, United States	
Win	32–14 (1)	Roosevelt Roberts	Submission (armbar)	UFC on ESPN: Blaydes vs. Volkov	June 20, 2020	1	2:25	Las Vegas, Nevada, United States	Catchweight (160 lb) bout. Performance of the Night.
Loss	31–14 (1)	Scott Holtzman	Decision (unanimous)	UFC Fight Night: Anderson vs. Błachowicz 2	February 15, 2020	3	5:00	Rio Rancho, New Mexico, United States	Fight of the Night.
Win	31–13 (1)	Clay Guida	Technical Submission (guillotine choke)	UFC on ESPN: Covington vs. Lawler	August 3, 2019	1	0:58	Newark, New Jersey, United States	
Win	30–13 (1)	Jason Gonzalez	Submission (rear-naked choke)	UFC Fight Night: Jacaré vs. Hermansson	April 27, 2019	1	2:12	Sunrise, Florida, United States	Performance of the Night.
Loss	29–13 (1)	Charles Oliveira	Submission (rear-naked choke)	UFC on Fox: Lee vs. Iaquinta 2	December 15, 2018	1	1:15	Milwaukee, Wisconsin, United States	
Win	29–12 (1)	Alex White	Submission (rear-naked choke)	UFC 228	September 8, 2018	1	1:29	Dallas, Texas, United States	
Loss	28–12 (1)	Dan Hooker	KO (knee)	UFC Fight Night: Barboza vs. Lee	April 21, 2018	1	3:00	Atlantic City, New Jersey, United States	
Loss	28–11 (1)	Francisco Trinaldo	Decision (unanimous)	UFC Fight Night: Brunson vs. Machida	October 28, 2017	3	5:00	São Paulo, Brazil	
Loss	28–10 (1)	Anthony Pettis	Decision (unanimous)	UFC 213	July 8, 2017	3	5:00	Las Vegas, Nevada, United States	
Loss	28–9 (1)	Dustin Poirier	Decision (majority)	UFC 208	February 11, 2017	3	5:00	Brooklyn, New York, United States	Fight of the Night.
Win	28–8 (1)	Thiago Alves	Decision (unanimous)	UFC 205	November 12, 2016	3	5:00	New York City, New York, United States	Catchweight (162.6 lb) bout; Alves missed weight.
Win	27–8 (1)	Joe Lauzon	Decision (split)	UFC on Fox: Maia vs. Condit	August 27, 2016	3	5:00	Vancouver, British Columbia, Canada	Fight of the Night.
Win	26–8 (1)	Takanori Gomi	TKO (punches)	UFC 200	July 9, 2016	1	2:18	Las Vegas, Nevada, United States	
Loss	25–8 (1)	Diego Sanchez	Decision (unanimous)	UFC 196	March 5, 2016	3	5:00	Las Vegas, Nevada, United States	
Loss	25–7 (1)	Michael Chiesa	Submission (rear-naked choke)	UFC Fight Night: Namajunas vs. VanZant	December 10, 2015	2	2:57	Las Vegas, Nevada, United States	Fight of the Night.
Win	25–6 (1)	Danny Castillo	Decision (split)	UFC on Fox: Dillashaw vs. Barão 2	July 25, 2015	3	5:00	Chicago, Illinois, United States	
Loss	24–6 (1)	Beneil Dariush	Decision (unanimous)	UFC on Fox: Machida vs. Rockhold	April 18, 2015	3	5:00	Newark, New Jersey, United States	
Loss	24–5 (1)	Donald Cerrone	KO (head kick and punches)	UFC Fight Night: Cowboy vs. Miller	July 16, 2014	2	3:31	Atlantic City, New Jersey, United States	
Win	24–4 (1)	Yancy Medeiros	Technical Submission (guillotine choke)	UFC 172	April 26, 2014	1	3:18	Baltimore, Maryland, United States	
Win	23–4 (1)	Fabrício Camões	Submission (armbar)	UFC 168	December 28, 2013	1	3:42	Las Vegas, Nevada, United States	
NC	22–4 (1)	Pat Healy	NC (overturned)	UFC 159	April 27, 2013	3	4:02	Newark, New Jersey, United States	Originally a technical submission (rear-naked choke) win for Healy; overturned after he tested positive for marijuana. Fight of the Night.
Win	22–4	Joe Lauzon	Decision (unanimous)	UFC 155	December 29, 2012	3	5:00	Las Vegas, Nevada, United States	Fight of the Night.
Loss	21–4	Nate Diaz	Submission (guillotine choke)	UFC on Fox: Diaz vs. Miller	May 5, 2012	2	4:09	East Rutherford, New Jersey, United States	
Win	21–3	Melvin Guillard	Submission (rear-naked choke)	UFC on FX: Guillard vs. Miller	January 20, 2012	1	3:04	Nashville, Tennessee, United States	Submission of the Night.
Loss	20–3	Benson Henderson	Decision (unanimous)	UFC Live: Hardy vs. Lytle	August 14, 2011	3	5:00	Milwaukee, Wisconsin, United States	
Win	20–2	Kamal Shalorus	TKO (knee and punches)	UFC 128	March 19, 2011	3	2:15	Newark, New Jersey, United States	
Win	19–2	Charles Oliveira	Submission (kneebar)	UFC 124	December 11, 2010	1	1:59	Montreal, Quebec, Canada	Submission of the Night.
Win	18–2	Gleison Tibau	Decision (unanimous)	UFC Fight Night: Marquardt vs. Palhares	September 15, 2010	3	5:00	Austin, Texas, United States	
Win	17–2	Mark Bocek	Decision (unanimous)	UFC 111	March 27, 2010	3	5:00	Newark, New Jersey, United States	
Win	16–2	Duane Ludwig	Submission (armbar)	UFC 108	January 2, 2010	1	2:31	Las Vegas, Nevada, United States	
Win	15–2	Steve Lopez	TKO (shoulder injury)	UFC 103	September 19, 2009	2	0:48	Dallas, Texas, United States	
Win	14–2	Mac Danzig	Decision (unanimous)	UFC 100	July 11, 2009	3	5:00	Las Vegas, Nevada, United States	
Loss	13–2	Gray Maynard	Decision (unanimous)	UFC 96	March 7, 2009	3	5:00	Columbus, Ohio, United States	
Win	13–1	Matt Wiman	Decision (unanimous)	UFC: Fight for the Troops	December 10, 2008	3	5:00	Fayetteville, North Carolina, United States	Fight of the Night.
Win	12–1	David Baron	Submission (rear-naked choke)	UFC 89	October 18, 2008	3	3:19	Birmingham, England	Submission of the Night.
Win	11–1	Bart Palaszewski	Decision (unanimous)	IFL 21	May 16, 2008	3	5:00	East Rutherford, New Jersey, United States	
Win	10–1	Chris Liguori	Submission (guillotine choke)	Ring of Combat 18	March 7, 2008	2	2:22	Atlantic City, New Jersey, United States	Won the vacant ROC Lightweight Championship.
Win	9–1	Chris Liguori	TKO (doctor stoppage)	Ring of Combat 17	November 30, 2007	2	5:00	Atlantic City, New Jersey, United States	Return to Lightweight.
Win	8–1	Nuri Shakir	Submission (rear-naked choke)	Battle Cage Xtreme 3	October 20, 2007	3	2:17	Atlantic City, New Jersey, United States	Welterweight debut. Won the USKBA Welterweight Championship.
Win	7–1	Anthony Morrison	Submission (triangle choke)	Cage Fury FC 5	June 23, 2007	1	4:56	Atlantic City, New Jersey, United States	Defended the Cage Fury FC Lightweight Championship.
Win	6–1	Al Buck	Submission (rear-naked choke)	Cage Fury FC 4	April 13, 2007	1	1:58	Atlantic City, New Jersey, United States	Won the Cage Fury FC Lightweight Championship.
Loss	5–1	Frankie Edgar	Decision (unanimous)	Reality Fighting 14	November 18, 2006	3	5:00	Atlantic City, New Jersey, United States	For the RF Lightweight Championship.
Win	5–0	James Jones	Submission (triangle choke)	Combat in the Cage: Marked Territory	September 30, 2006	2	1:55	Lincroft, New Jersey, United States	Return to Lightweight.
Win	4–0	Muhsin Corbbrey	Submission (armbar)	Reality Fighting 13	August 5, 2006	2	3:35	Wildwood, New Jersey, United States	Featherweight debut. Won the vacant RF Featherweight Championship.
Win	3–0	Joseph Andujar	Submission (arm-triangle choke)	Reality Fighting 12	April 29, 2006	1	1:04	Atlantic City, New Jersey, United States	
Win	2–0	Kevin Roddy	Submission (rear-naked choke)	Reality Fighting 11	February 11, 2006	1	1:31	Atlantic City, New Jersey, United States	
Win	1–0	Eddie Fyvie	Decision (unanimous)	Reality Fighting 10	November 19, 2005	2	5:00	Atlantic City, New Jersey, United States	Lightweight debut.

== See also ==
- List of current UFC fighters
- List of male mixed martial artists
