= Mitch Clarke =

Canadian mixed martial arts fighter (born 1985)

- Born: Mitchell Bradley Clarke; November 24, 1985 (age 40); Saskatoon, Saskatchewan, Canada
- Other names: Danger Zone
- Height: 5 ft 10 in (1.78 m)
- Weight: 154 lb (70 kg; 11 st 0 lb)
- Division: Lightweight (155 lb); Welterweight (170 lb)
- Reach: 73.0 in (185 cm)
- Fighting out of: Edmonton, Alberta, Canada
- Team: Complete Fitness and Martial Arts; Hayabusa Training Center; The MMA Lab (2012–2016); Jackson-Wink MMA (2016–2017)
- Rank: 1st degree black belt in Brazilian jiu-jitsu under Rodrigo Munduruca
- Years active: 2007–2017

Mixed martial arts record
- Total: 16
- Wins: 11
- By knockout: 1
- By submission: 7
- By decision: 3
- Losses: 5
- By knockout: 2
- By submission: 1
- By decision: 2

Other information
- Mixed martial arts record from Sherdog

Mitchell Bradley Clarke (born November 24, 1985) is a Canadian professional wrestler and former mixed martial artist. He fought as a Lightweight for the Ultimate Fighting Championship, and is the head coach at Complete Fitness & Martial Arts in St. Albert, Canada. He currently wrestles for the Edmonton based promotions Real Canadian Wrestling and Love Wrestling. He also wrestles for Best Entertainment Wrestling based out of Saskatoon, Saskatchewan.

== Background ==
Clarke was born and raised in Saskatoon, Saskatchewan. He competed in wrestling at Walter Murray Collegiate Institute. He attended the University of Saskatchewan from where he graduated with a degree in environmental science.

== Mixed martial arts career ==
=== Early career ===
Clarke made his professional MMA debut in May 2007. He fought exclusively in Canada and amassed a record of 9–0 before signing with the Ultimate Fighting Championship.

=== Ultimate Fighting Championship ===
Clarke made his UFC debut at UFC 140 in Toronto, Ontario against promotional newcomer John Cholish. He lost the fight via TKO (punches) at 4:36 of the second round resulting in the first loss of his professional career.

Clarke faced Anton Kuivanen on July 21, 2012 at UFC 149. He lost the fight via split decision.

Clarke faced John Maguire on June 15, 2013 at UFC 161. He won the fight via unanimous decision.

Clarke faced Al Iaquinta at UFC 173, in his first match outside of Canada. After being dominated in the first round, Clarke won the fight via submission due to a D'Arce choke from the bottom in the second round. The win earned Clarke his first Performance of the Night bonus award.

Clarke faced Michael Chiesa on April 4, 2015 at UFC Fight Night 63. He lost the fight by unanimous decision.

Clarke next faced Joseph Duffy on July 7, 2016 at UFC Fight Night 90. He lost the fight via submission in the opening minute of the first round.

Clarke faced Alex White on September 9, 2017 at UFC 215. He lost the fight via TKO at 4:36 of the second round and subsequently announced his retirement from mixed martial arts. He voiced his appreciation to Edmonton fans at the after fight octagon interview with Joe Rogan and delivered his emotional and humble retirement speech:

Thank you Joe, thank you DC (Daniel Cormier). I think that toughness has been the tail of my career and pushing me beyond what my body physically able to do is sheer wit and will and toughness, and I am in absolutely pleasure to fight in front of my adopted hometown of Edmonton. And although I could not get the result I wanted, it was an absolutely pleasure to have my last professional fight and here Edmonton it is the last time I have put this on (his fighting glove) so to thank you Edmonton and thank you Joe."

== Personal life ==
He currently resides in Edmonton, Alberta, and trains at Complete Fitness and Martial Arts in St. Albert. He has won the Welterweight title with the EFC out of Lloydminster and also won the Lightweight title for the TFC. He also trains in Arizona at the MMA Lab with John Crouch and Benson Henderson. Clarke is the son of Rick Clarke & Elise Brust and stepson of Vickie Clarke. After UFC 173, Clarke told reporters his favourite Super NES video game is Turtles in Time.

== Championships and achievements ==
=== Mixed martial arts ===
- Evolution Fighting Championships
  - EFC Lightweight Championship (1 time)
- The Fight Club
  - TFC Lightweight Championship (1 time)
- Ultimate Fighting Championship
  - Performance of the Night (One time) vs. Al Iaquinta
  - UFC.com Awards
    - 2014: Ranked #5 Submission of the Year vs. Al Iaquinta

=== Professional wrestling ===
- Best Entertainment Wrestling
  - BEW Y Division Championship (1 time)
- CanAm Wrestling
  - Stu Hart Memorial Heavyweight Championship (1 time)
- Love Pro Wrestling
  - LPW Challenge Championship (1 time)
- Monster Pro Wrestling
  - MPW Heavyweight Championship (1 time)
  - MPW Renegade Tag Team Championships (2 times) - with Lumberjack Larry / Larry Woods
- Real Canadian Wrestling
  - RCW Canadian Heavyweight Championship (1 time)
  - RCW North American Championship (1 time, current)
- Top Talent Wrestling
  - Top Talent Championship (1 time, current)

== Mixed martial arts record ==
Professional record breakdown
16 matches	11 wins	5 losses
By knockout	1	2
By submission	7	1
By decision	3	2

Res.	Record	Opponent	Method	Event	Date	Round	Time	Location	Notes
Loss	11–5	Alex White	TKO (punches)	UFC 215	September 9, 2017	2	4:36	Edmonton, Alberta, Canada	
Loss	11–4	Joseph Duffy	Submission (rear-naked choke)	UFC Fight Night: dos Anjos vs. Alvarez	July 7, 2016	1	0:25	Las Vegas, Nevada, United States	
Loss	11–3	Michael Chiesa	Decision (unanimous)	UFC Fight Night: Mendes vs. Lamas	April 4, 2015	3	5:00	Fairfax, Virginia, United States	
Win	11–2	Al Iaquinta	Technical Submission (D'Arce choke)	UFC 173	May 24, 2014	2	0:57	Las Vegas, Nevada, United States	Performance of the Night.
Win	10–2	John Maguire	Decision (unanimous)	UFC 161	June 15, 2013	3	5:00	Winnipeg, Manitoba, Canada	
Loss	9–2	Anton Kuivanen	Decision (split)	UFC 149	July 21, 2012	3	5:00	Calgary, Alberta, Canada	
Loss	9–1	John Cholish	TKO (punches)	UFC 140	December 10, 2011	2	4:36	Toronto, Ontario, Canada	
Win	9–0	Eddie Rincon	Decision (unanimous)	EFC 8: Aggression	April 23, 2011	3	5:00	Lloydminster, Alberta, Canada	
Win	8–0	Josh Machan	Submission (rear-naked choke)	The Fight Club 11	September 10, 2010	2	0:43	Edmonton, Alberta, Canada	Won the TFC Lightweight Championship.
Win	7–0	Brandon MacArthur	Submission (rear-naked choke)	The Fight Club 10	March 19, 2010	2	1:14	Edmonton, Alberta, Canada	Catchweight (160 lbs) bout.
Win	6–0	Travis Briere	Decision (unanimous)	Adrenaline 1	October 2, 2009	3	3:00	Edmonton, Alberta, Canada	
Win	5–0	Adam Hunsperger	Submission (guillotine choke)	The Fight Club 7: Full Throttle	May 30, 2009	1	0:56	Edmonton, Alberta, Canada	
Win	4–0	Paul Grandbois	Submission (armbar)	EFC 2: Redemption	March 14, 2009	2	2:41	Lloydminster, Alberta, Canada	Defended the EFC Welterweight Championship.
Win	3–0	Darren Ford	Submission (guillotine choke)	EFC 1: First Conflict	September 20, 2008	1	N/A	Lloydminster, Alberta, Canada	Won the EFC Welterweight Championship.
Win	2–0	Jase Nibourg	TKO (punches)	KOTC: Brawl in the Mall 2	October 19, 2007	1	3:41	Edmonton, Alberta, Canada	
Win	1–0	Jase Nibourg	Submission (choke)	XCW: Extreme Cage Warz	May 12, 2007	N/A	N/A	Saskatoon, Saskatchewan, Canada	

== See also ==
- List of current UFC fighters
- List of male mixed martial artists
- List of Canadian UFC fighters
