= Joe Proctor =

American mixed martial artist

- Born: August 10, 1985 (age 41); Quincy, Massachusetts, United States
- Height: 5 ft 10 in (1.78 m)
- Weight: 170 lb (77 kg; 12 st)
- Division: Welterweight; Lightweight
- Reach: 72.0 in (183 cm)
- Fighting out of: Easton, Massachusetts, United States
- Team: Lauzon MMA
- Years active: 2008–present

Mixed martial arts record
- Total: 16
- Wins: 11
- By knockout: 2
- By submission: 5
- By decision: 4
- Losses: 5
- By knockout: 3
- By submission: 1
- By decision: 1

Other information
- Mixed martial arts record from Sherdog

Joseph Edward Proctor (born August 10, 1985) is an American mixed martial artist who most recently competed in the welterweight division of the Ultimate Fighting Championship. A professional competitor since 2008, Proctor was also a competitor on The Ultimate Fighter: Live.

== Background ==
Proctor was born in Quincy, Massachusetts, but raised in Pembroke, Massachusetts. He attended the University of Massachusetts Dartmouth. Proctor worked in construction before a friend suggested he try jiu-jitsu. Proctor began training at Lauzon MMA in Bridgewater, Massachusetts, with UFC veteran and submission specialist Joe Lauzon.

== Mixed martial arts career ==
=== Early career ===
Proctor held an amateur record of 5-1 before starting his professional career in August 2008, winning his first fight by decision. Over the next three years he amassed a record of 7-1.

=== The Ultimate Fighter ===
Proctor was one of 32 Lightweight fighters announced by the UFC to participate in first live season of The Ultimate Fighter reality show.

Proctor won his way into the house when he defeated Jordan Rinaldi by a guillotine choke submission in the first round. With that victory, he was chosen as the fourth pick by Team Faber.

Proctor won his next match against Team Cruz's seventh pick, Chris Tickle. He defeated Tickle with a rear-naked choke submission near the end of the first round, gaining entry into the quarter-finals.

For his quarter-final fight, Proctor was matched up with striking specialist James Vick. Proctor was unable to take Vick down in the fight and was outmatched on the feet. Proctor lost the fight by unanimous decision after the second round, thus eliminating him from the competition.

=== Ultimate Fighting Championship ===
Proctor made his UFC debut against fellow cast member Jeremy Larsen on June 1, 2012, at The Ultimate Fighter 15 Finale. He won the fight via TKO due to a combination of a knee and punches in the first round.

Proctor next faced Ramsey Nijem on December 8, 2012, at UFC on Fox 5. He lost the fight via unanimous decision.

Proctor was expected to face Al Iaquinta on April 27, 2013, at UFC 159. However, the bout was scrapped as both fighters sustained training injuries leading up to the fight.

Proctor faced Cristiano Marcello on February 15, 2014, at UFC Fight Night 36. He won the fight via unanimous decision.

Proctor faced Justin Salas on July 16, 2014, at UFC Fight Night 45. Proctor won the bout via second-round TKO.

Proctor faced Yancy Medeiros on December 12, 2014, at The Ultimate Fighter 20 Finale. He lost the fight via submission in the first round after being dropped with a spinning back kick to the body.

Proctor faced Justin Edwards on June 6, 2015, at UFC Fight Night 68. He won the back-and-forth fight via submission with just seconds remaining in the final round, resulting in the latest submission win in the UFC Lightweight division.

Proctor faced Magomed Mustafaev on December 12, 2015, at UFC 194. He lost the fight via TKO in the first round.

Proctor was expected to face Erik Koch on May 29, 2016, at UFC Fight Night 88. However, Proctor pulled out of the fight on April 21 citing injury and was replaced by Shane Campbell.

Proctor faced Bryan Barberena on April 22, 2017, at UFC Fight Night 108. He lost the fight via TKO in the first round and was subsequently released from the promotion.

== Championships and accomplishments ==
=== Mixed martial arts ===
- Reality Fighting
  - RF Lightweight Championship (One time)
- American Fighting Organization
  - AFO Lightweight Championship (One time)

== Mixed martial arts record ==
Professional record breakdown
16 matches	11 wins	5 losses
By knockout	2	3
By submission	5	1
By decision	4	1

Res.	Record	Opponent	Method	Event	Date	Round	Time	Location	Notes
Loss	11–5	Bryan Barberena	TKO (knees and punches)	UFC Fight Night: Swanson vs. Lobov	April 22, 2017	1	1:34	Nashville, Tennessee, United States	Welterweight debut.
Loss	11–4	Magomed Mustafaev	TKO (knees and punches)	UFC 194	December 12, 2015	1	1:54	Las Vegas, Nevada, United States	
Win	11–3	Justin Edwards	Technical Submission (guillotine choke)	UFC Fight Night: Boetsch vs. Henderson	June 6, 2015	3	4:58	New Orleans, Louisiana, United States	
Loss	10–3	Yancy Medeiros	Submission (guillotine choke)	The Ultimate Fighter: A Champion Will Be Crowned Finale	December 12, 2014	1	4:37	Las Vegas, Nevada, United States	
Win	10–2	Justin Salas	TKO (punches)	UFC Fight Night: Cowboy vs. Miller	July 16, 2014	2	3:27	Atlantic City, New Jersey, United States	
Win	9–2	Cristiano Marcello	Decision (unanimous)	UFC Fight Night: Machida vs. Mousasi	February 15, 2014	3	5:00	Jaraguá do Sul, Brazil	
Loss	8–2	Ramsey Nijem	Decision (unanimous)	UFC on Fox: Henderson vs. Diaz	December 8, 2012	3	5:00	Seattle, Washington, United States	
Win	8–1	Jeremy Larsen	KO (knee and punches)	The Ultimate Fighter: Live Finale	June 1, 2012	1	1:59	Las Vegas, Nevada, United States	
Win	7–1	Matt Bessette	Decision (unanimous)	Reality Fighting: Gonzaga vs. Porter	October 8, 2011	5	5:00	Uncasville, Connecticut, United States	Won the RF Lightweight Championship.
Win	6–1	Oz Pariser	Decision (unanimous)	Reality Fighting: Mohegan Sun	May 21, 2011	3	5:00	Uncasville, Connecticut, United States	
Win	5–1	Eric Fama	Submission (guillotine choke)	Reality Fighting: Mohegan Sun	February 26, 2011	2	3:22	Uncasville, Connecticut, United States	
Loss	4–1	Luis Felix	TKO (punches)	AFO: Thanksgiving Massacre 3	November 24, 2010	2	2:24	Mansfield, Massachusetts, United States	Lost the AFO Lightweight Championship.
Win	4–0	Nelson Gaipo	Submission (guillotine choke)	AFO: Summer Brawl	June 25, 2010	1	1:14	Mansfield, Massachusetts, United States	Won the vacant AFO Lightweight Championship.
Win	3–0	Matt Casio	Submission (armbar)	AFO: Night of Champions 2	April 24, 2010	3	5:00	Plymouth, Massachusetts, United States	
Win	2–0	Will Seaver	Submission (rear-naked choke)	FFP: Untamed 30	February 19, 2010	1	1:33	Westport, Massachusetts, United States	
Win	1–0	Joe DeChaves	Decision (split)	Reality Fighting: Ferocity	August 16, 2008	3	4:00	Plymouth, Massachusetts, United States	

=== Mixed martial arts exhibition record ===
Exhibition record breakdown		
3 matches	2 wins	1 loss
By submission	2	0
By decision	0	1

Res.	Record	Opponent	Method	Event	Date	Round	Time	Location	Notes
Loss	2–1	James Vick	Decision (unanimous)	The Ultimate Fighter: Live	May 11, 2012 (airdate)	2	5:00	Las Vegas, Nevada, United States	The Ultimate Fighter: Live Quarter-final round
Win	2–0	Chris Tickle	Submission (rear-naked choke)	The Ultimate Fighter: Live	April 13, 2012 (airdate)	1	4:42	Las Vegas, Nevada, United States	The Ultimate Fighter: Live Preliminary round
Win	1–0	Jordan Rinaldi	Submission (guillotine choke)	The Ultimate Fighter: Live	March 9, 2012 (airdate)	1	2:08	Las Vegas, Nevada, United States	The Ultimate Fighter: Live Elimination round

== See also ==
- List of current UFC fighters
- List of male mixed martial artists
