= Justin Lawrence (fighter) =

American mixed martial arts fighter (born 1990)

- Born: Justin Ray Lawrence; May 15, 1990 (age 36); Pacific, Missouri, United States
- Other names: The American Kidd; The Hammer (formerly)
- Height: 5 ft 8 in (173 cm)
- Weight: 145 lb (66 kg; 10 st 5 lb)
- Division: Lightweight; Featherweight
- Reach: 67 in (170 cm)
- Style: Kickboxing
- Stance: Orthodox
- Fighting out of: Los Angeles, California, United States; Pacific, Missouri, United States
- Team: Blackhouse MMA; 21st Century Self Defense; Alliance MMA
- Rank: Black belt in Kempo Karate
- Years active: 2010–2018

Mixed martial arts record
- Total: 16
- Wins: 11
- By knockout: 5
- By submission: 1
- By decision: 5
- Losses: 5
- By knockout: 1
- By submission: 1
- By decision: 3

Other information
- Mixed martial arts record from Sherdog

Justin Ray Lawrence (born May 15, 1990) is an American former professional mixed martial artist who used to compete in the Featherweight division of Bellator MMA. A professional MMA competitor since 2010, Lawrence has also formerly competed for the UFC, Strikeforce, the RFA, and was a competitor on FX's The Ultimate Fighter: Live.

== Background ==
Originally from Pacific, Missouri, Lawrence began training at the age of six under his step-father, Benny Voyles, a former professional boxer and kickboxer who owns his own gym in St. Louis, Missouri. Lawrence would go on to become a two-time St. Louis' Golden Gloves Boxing Tournament Champion, and compile over 150 amateur kickboxing wins. In kickboxing, Lawrence also was a six-time IKF International Kickboxing Federation National Kickboxing Champion, and a two-time Pan-American Kickboxing Champion. Lawrence began wrestling in the third grade, and was talented, placing in the state tournament multiple times as well as in football as a running back at Pacific High School.

== Mixed martial arts career ==
=== Early career ===
In 2007 Lawrence began his MMA career, taking his first amateur fight, winning in the first round via submission (rear-naked choke). He picked up four more amateur wins, accumulating a record of 5-0 before turning professional.

Lawrence's professional debut came on December 4, 2010 at Strikeforce: Henderson vs. Babalu II in St. Louis, Missouri. His opponent was highly touted Russian fighter, Max Martyniouk, who was also making his professional debut. Lawrence dominated throughout the bout but after Lawrence delivered a soccer kick to the head of the downed Martyniouk the fight was forced to go to a technical decision. Despite the illegal kick, Lawrence was awarded the win via a unanimous technical decision (30-27, 30-27, 30-27).

After the exposure from Strikeforce, Lawrence received a call from Ohio promotion, Bobish's Ultimate Cage Battles, to fight on their April 9, 2011 card. Lawrence fought Pete Martin winning the fight via unanimous decision. Lawrence then fought Jason Webb on November 11, 2011 at Fight Me MMA 3. Lawrence won the fight via submission (armbar) in the first round.

=== The Ultimate Fighter ===
In February 2012, it was revealed that Lawrence was selected to be a participant on The Ultimate Fighter: Live. Lawrence defeated two-time WEC veteran James Krause via TKO to move into the Ultimate Fighter house, and become an official cast member.

Lawrence was selected as the first overall pick by Dominick Cruz to take part on Team Cruz. In the first round of the tournament, Lawrence was selected to fight PRIDE veteran, Cristiano Marcello. Lawrence was able to defeat Marcello by knockout at 3:15 of the second round, earning a place in the quarter-finals.

Lawrence's quarter-final fight was against Team Faber's Michael Chiesa. After a hard fought two rounds the judges declared a draw and the fight went to a third, "sudden-death" round. Lawrence was mounted early in the third round and lost via TKO, eliminating him from the competition.

=== Ultimate Fighting Championship ===
Though Lawrence did not win the show, UFC President Dana White decided to sign all 16 cast members to exclusive UFC contracts. Lawrence made his UFC debut at The Ultimate Fighter 15 Finale on June 1, 2012 against fellow TUF cast member, John Cofer. Lawrence won via KO due to a head kick in the opening seconds of the third round. The performance earned both participants Fight of the Night honors, with Lawrence also earning a Knockout of the Night bonus.

Lawrence made his Featherweight debut, dropping down to face Max Holloway on August 11, 2012 at UFC 150. After two close rounds Lawrence lost the fight via TKO (body punches) at 4:49 of the second round.

Lawrence next faced Daniel Pineda on April 13, 2013 at The Ultimate Fighter 17 Finale. He lost the fight via submission in the first round and was subsequently released from the promotion.

=== Resurrection Fighting Alliance ===
Following his release from the UFC, Lawrence signed with the Resurrection Fighting Alliance. Lawrence faced Luis Saldaña at RFA 10 on October 25, 2013. Lawrence won the fight via unanimous decision.

=== Bellator MMA ===
In April 2015, Lawrence signed a multi-fight contract with Bellator MMA. He made his debut against Sean Wilson on June 19, 2015 at Bellator 138. Lawrence won the fight via TKO in the first round.

In his second fight for the promotion, Lawrence was expected to face Pat Curran on November 6, 2015 at Bellator 145. Lawrence instead faced Emmanuel Sanchez after Curran pulled out of the bout due to a knee injury. He lost the back-and-forth fight via split decision.

Lawrence next faced Isao Kobayashi at Bellator 157: Dynamite 2 on June 24, 2016. He won the fight via knockout in the second round.

Lawrence faced John Teixeira at Bellator 167 on December 3, 2016. He lost the fight via unanimous decision.

Lawrence faced Treston Thomison at Bellator 181 on July 14, 2017. He won the fight via TKO due to doctor stoppage in the first round.

Lawrence faced Andrew Natividad at Bellator 193 on January 26, 2018. He won the fight via unanimous decision.

Lawrence faced A. J. McKee at Bellator 197 on April 13, 2018. He lost the fight by unanimous decision.

== Championships and accomplishments ==
=== Kickboxing ===
- International Kickboxing Federation
  - National Champion (Six Times)
  - Pan-American Kickboxing Champion (Two times)

=== Boxing ===
- St. Louis Golden Gloves
  - Golden Gloves Champion (Two times)
  - Diamond Gloves Champion (Two times)

=== Mixed martial arts ===
- Ultimate Fighting Championship
  - Fight of the Night (One time)
  - Knockout of the Night (One time)
- Resurrection Fighting Alliance
  - RFA Featherweight Champion (One time)

== Mixed martial arts record ==
Professional record breakdown
16 matches	11 wins	5 losses
By knockout	5	1
By submission	1	1
By decision	5	3
Draws	0	

Res.	Record	Opponent	Method	Event	Date	Round	Time	Location	Notes
Loss	11–5	A. J. McKee	Decision (unanimous)	Bellator 197	April 13, 2018	3	5:00	St. Charles, Missouri, United States	
Win	11–4	Andrew Natividad	Decision (unanimous)	Bellator 193	January 26, 2018	3	5:00	Temecula, California, United States	
Win	10–4	Treston Thomison	TKO (doctor stoppage)	Bellator 181	July 14, 2017	1	3:34	Thackerville, Oklahoma, United States	
Loss	9–4	John Macapá	Decision (unanimous)	Bellator 167	December 3, 2016	3	5:00	Thackerville, Oklahoma, United States	
Win	9–3	Isao Kobayashi	KO (punches)	Bellator 157: Dynamite 2	June 24, 2016	2	2:11	St. Louis, Missouri, United States	
Loss	8–3	Emmanuel Sanchez	Decision (split)	Bellator 145	November 6, 2015	3	5:00	St. Louis, Missouri, United States	
Win	8–2	Sean Wilson	TKO (elbows and punches)	Bellator 138	June 19, 2015	1	4:56	St. Louis, Missouri, United States	
Win	7–2	Sam Toomer	TKO (knees to the body and punches)	RFA 25: Lawrence vs. Toomer	April 10, 2015	1	4:55	Sioux Falls, South Dakota, United States	Defended the RFA Featherweight Championship.
Win	6–2	Mark Dickman	Decision (unanimous)	RFA 17: Cochrane vs. Giagos	August 22, 2014	5	5:00	Sioux Falls, South Dakota, United States	Won the vacant RFA Featherweight Championship.
Win	5–2	Luis Saldaña	Decision (unanimous)	RFA 10	October 25, 2013	3	5:00	Des Moines, Iowa, United States	
Loss	4–2	Daniel Pineda	Submission (kimura)	The Ultimate Team Jones vs. Team Sonnen Finale	April 13, 2013	1	1:35	Las Vegas, Nevada, United States	
Loss	4–1	Max Holloway	TKO (punches)	UFC 150	August 11, 2012	2	4:49	Denver, Colorado, United States	Featherweight debut.
Win	4–0	John Cofer	KO (head kick)	The Ultimate Fighter: Live Finale	June 1, 2012	3	0:19	Las Vegas, Nevada, United States	Fight of the Night. Knockout of the Night.
Win	3–0	Jason Webb	Submission (armbar)	Fight Me MMA 3	November 11, 2011	1	2:17	St. Charles, Missouri, United States	
Win	2–0	Pete Martin	Decision (unanimous)	Bobish's Ultimate Cage Battles 4	April 9, 2011	3	5:00	Parma, Ohio, United States	
Win	1–0	Max Martyniouk	Technical Decision (unanimous)	Strikeforce: Henderson vs. Babalu II	December 4, 2010	3	N/A	St. Louis, Missouri, United States	The fight was stopped in round three due to an accidental soccer kick by Lawrence.
