= The Ultimate Fighter: Live =

UFC mixed martial arts television series and event in 2012

- Genre: Reality, Sports
- Created by: Frank Fertitta III, Lorenzo Fertitta, Dana White
- Starring: Dana White, Jon Anik, Dominick Cruz, and Urijah Faber
- Country of origin: United States

Production
- Running time: 60 minutes

Original release
- Network: FX
- Release: March 9 – June 1, 2012

The Ultimate Fighter: Live (also known as The Ultimate Fighter 15) was the fifteenth installment of the Ultimate Fighting Championship (UFC)-produced reality television series The Ultimate Fighter. This season marked the show's debut on the FX network, the debut of Jon Anik as the show's host, and featured Lightweight fighters.

As part of the deal with FX, the show was revamped. Prior seasons of the show were filmed in six weeks, edited and aired several months after filming was completed. This season the show was being filmed over thirteen weeks and was being edited "the week of" before being broadcast. In addition this season was the first to feature live fights.

The UFC and FX held open tryouts on December 5, 2011, in Las Vegas, Nevada. The casting call went out for Lightweight and Welterweight fighters. Some of the fighters that showed up for the tryouts included UFC veteran Jamie Yager, WEC veteran Blas Avena, and Bellator veterans Rudy Bears, Zak Cummings, and Jacob McClintock, and K-1 kickboxer Kultar Gill.

On December 6, 2011, it was announced that the coaches for the season would be Dominick Cruz and Urijah Faber. They were set to fight for the title, until Cruz's injury on May 7, 2012. The show debuted on March 9, 2012.

== Cast ==
=== Coaches ===
Team Cruz

- Dominick Cruz, head coach
- Doug Balzarini
- Phil Davis, wrestling coach
- Eric DelFierro
- Lloyd Irvin
- Ross Pearson
- Wilson Reis
- Shanon Slack

Team Faber

- Urijah Faber, head coach
- Dustin Akbari
- Justin Buchholz
- Lance Palmer
- Fabio Prado
- Thonglor "Master Thong" Armatsena, Muay Thai coach
- Danny Castillo
- T.J. Dillashaw

=== Fighters ===
Team Cruz

- Justin Lawrence, Sam Sicilia, Myles Jury, Mike Rio, James Vick, Vinc Pichel, Chris Tickle, Jeremy Larsen

Team Faber

- Al Iaquinta, Cristiano Marcello, Daron Cruickshank, Joe Proctor, Michael Chiesa, John Cofer, Andy Ogle, Chris Saunders

Fighters eliminated during the entry round

- Akbarh Arreola, Erin Beach, Jared Carlsten, Dakota Cochrane, Drew Dober, Mark Glover, Chase Hackett, James Krause, Austin Lyons, Ali Maclean, Cody Pfister, Jordan Rinaldi, Jeff Smith, Jon Tuck, Brendan Weafer, Johnavan Vistante

== Episodes ==
Episode 1 (March 9, 2012)

- Two days prior to the live episode, the 32 fighters were introduced to Dana White and the two coaches, UFC bantamweight champion Dominick Cruz and Urijah Faber. White explains that an elimination round will be held and only 16 of the fighters will move on to the Ultimate Fighter house to compete during the rest of the season. He further explains that the elimination fights will each consist of a single five-minute round.
- The bonus awards are explained:
  - Fan vote for best fight of the season earns each fighter $25,000.
  - Fan vote for best submission of the season earns the winner $25,000.
  - Fan vote for best knock out of the season earns the winner $25,000.
  - Any fight ending via submission, knock out, or referee stoppage earns the winner $5,000.
  - The winner of TUF 15 and his coach will also win a Harley Davidson motorcycle.
  - The winner of TUF 15 will earn a one-year sponsorship deal with Tapout.
- The elimination round fights are held:
  - Joe Proctor defeats Jordan Rinaldi by submission (guillotine choke) at 2:08
  - Cristiano Marcello defeats Jared Carlsten by submission (rear naked choke) at 2:43.
  - Sam Sicilia defeats Erin Beach by TKO (strikes) at :08.
  - Chris Tickle defeats Austin Lyons by TKO (strikes) at :24.
  - Andy Ogle defeats Brendan Weafer by unanimous decision (10–9, 10–9, 10–9).
  - Vinc Pichel defeats Cody Pfister by submission (rear naked choke) at 3:39.
  - John Cofer defeats Mark Glover by unanimous decision (10–9, 10–9, 10–9).
  - Chris Saunders defeats Chase Hackett by unanimous decision (10–9, 10–9, 10–9).
  - James Vick defeats Dakota Cochrane by split decision (9–10, 10–9, 10–9).
  - Michael Chiesa defeats Johnavan Vistante by submission (rear naked choke) at 2:05.
  - Mike Rio defeats Ali Maclean by submission (rear naked choke) at 3:32.
  - Justin Lawrence defeats James Krause by TKO (strikes) at 1:25.
  - Daron Cruickshank defeats Drew Dober by unanimous decision (10–9, 10–9, 10–9).
  - Jeremy Larsen defeats Jeff Smith by unanimous decision (10–9, 10–9, 10–9).
  - Al Iaquinta defeats Jon Tuck by unanimous decision (10–9, 10–9, 10–9).
- Tuck appeared to break a right toe during the fight.
  - Myles Jury defeats Akbarh Arreola by unanimous decision (10–9, 10–9, 10–9).

Post Episode 1

The first episode earned a television rating consisting of 1.28 million viewers which was less than the 1.5 million viewers for The Ultimate Fighter: Team Bisping vs. Team Miller. Following his win in the elimination round, Jeremy Larsen was medically suspended by the Nevada State Athletic Commission (NSAC) due to a cut on his head. His suspension is scheduled to last until April 9. However, Keith Kizer, the NSAC Executive Director, said the NSAC and its doctors will evaluate Larsen each week to determine if Larsen can be medically cleared sooner. Other medical suspensions from the elimination round fights include Jeff Smith (Arachnoid cyst), James Krause (possible ankle injury), Cody Pfister (cut to right eye), Austin Lyons (due to knock out) and Erin Beach (due to technical knock out and cut on lower lip).

Episode 2: "Embrace the War" (March 16, 2012)

- Saturday 8 am: The fighters and coaches are at the UFC training center with White. White announces that he will flip a coin (red for Cruz, blue for Faber) to pick a coach. The coach who wins the coin flip will have the option of picking the first fighter or the first fight. Faber wins the coin flip and decides to pick the first fight. Cruz makes the first fighter pick and the coaches alternate picking fighters for their teams.

Coach	1st Pick	2nd Pick	3rd Pick	4th Pick	5th Pick	6th Pick	7th Pick	8th Pick
Cruz	Justin Lawrence	Sam Sicilia	Myles Jury	Mike Rio	James Vick	Vinc Pichel	Chris Tickle	Jeremy Larsen
Faber	Al Iaquinta	Cristiano Marcello	Daron Cruickshank	Joe Proctor	Michael Chiesa	John Cofer	Andy Ogle	Chris Saunders

- Saturday 2 pm:Faber matches Vick against Cruickshank.
  - Before the fight announcement, Faber questions Cruz on a comment made in a UFC magazine interview where Cruz mentioned that Faber's family had probably helped him purchase his gym. Faber denies the statement and warns the champion to stay away from family comments. Cruz apologizes before the announcement.
- Sunday 2 pm: Michael Chiesa, at the training center, is told to call home and finds out that his father died the day before. Chiesa talks about his father having been ill and making him promise to stay on the show regardless of what happens. When Chiesa gets back to the TUF house, he tells Sam Sicilia, whom he knows from home, about his father's death.
- Monday 9 am: White meets with Chiesa and says that he can go home for a couple days to be with his family to attend the funeral, and can then rejoin the show afterwards.
- Thursday 4 pm: The fighters weigh-in. Vick weighs in at 154 pounds (70 kg) and Cruickshank at 155.5 pounds (70.5 kg).
- Live: James Vick defeats Daron Cruickshank by KO (knee) at 2:16 of the first round.
  - Following the fight, Cruz having won control is allowed to make the next fight pick. From his team, Cruz picks Lawrence, the first overall pick. Cruz then tells Faber that he can pick anyone from his team to face Lawrence. Faber hesitates before asking if anyone from his team wants to fight Lawrence. When no one volunteers, Faber tells Cruz to make the pick for him. Cruz picks Marcello to face Lawrence in a week's time.

Episode 3: "Old School vs. New School" (March 23, 2012)

- Friday 8:15 pm: Following the previous week's live episode there is discussion among both teams in regards to the hesitancy on the part of Team Faber to choose someone to face Justin Lawrence.
- Sunday 8 am: Chris Tickle, wearing a gas mask, starts this season's prank war by attempting to move Faber's parking sign across the street. In attempting to do so, he breaks the sign and places it in a pile of tires used inside the UFC training center.
- Monday 11 am: During the Team Faber training session, Marcello discusses strategy and prepares for his fight against Lawrence. In response to Tickle's prank, Team Faber puts tape on a large poster of Cruz making him appear like Eddie Munster.
- Tuesday 10:30 am: John Cofer makes a joke about how Tickle walks. Tickle gets offended by the joke and a verbal argument ensues.
- Tuesday 11 am: During the Team Cruz training session, there is a focus for Lawrence on Brazilian jiu jitsu defense. The prank war also continues as the red team constructs a "thong" for the large poster of Faber, placing it on his "butt chin."
- Thursday 4 pm: At the official weigh-ins, both Lawrence and Marcello weigh in at 156 pounds (71 kg).
- Live: Justin Lawrence defeats Cristiano Marcello by KO (punches) at 3:15 of the second round.
  - Team Cruz maintains control of the fight pick. The fight for the following week is announced to be Myles Jury vs. Al Iaquinta, Team Faber's number 1 pick.

Episode 4: "All the Pressure" (March 30, 2012)

- Saturday 9 am: During Team Cruz practice, Mike Rio tweaks a knee while sparring with Jury.
- Sunday 3 pm: Various fighters discuss the difficulties of being away from their families for three months without any contact while only being three weeks into the show.
- Tuesday 2 pm: Faber brings "life coach" Jim Peterson to TUF house to speak with all of the fighters. Chris Tickle decides not to attend the talk.
- Wednesday 8 am: Rio is still complaining of pain in his knee.
- Thursday 4 pm: At the official weigh-ins, Jury weighs 154 pounds (70 kg) and Iaquinta weighed 155 pounds (70 kg).
- Live: Al Iaquinta defeats Myles Jury by split decision after three rounds.
  - Team Faber gains control of the fight pick. The fight for the following week is announced to be Jeremy Larsen vs. Michael Chiesa.

Post Episode 4

- The live fight between Al Iaquinta and Myles Jury went to a third round due to a draw following the first two rounds. Circumstances surrounding a network commercial break resulted in a three-minute break between the second and third rounds. Normally, there is only a one-minute break between rounds. White said in an interview following the episode that the longer breaks can result in fighters starting to cool down or cramp up. White stated that the UFC and FX will be working on ensuring that extended breaks between rounds does not occur again.

Episode 5: "That Miserable Feeling" (April 6, 2012)

- Friday: Following the previous week's live fight and the announcement that Chiesa would be fighting Larsen, Sam Sicilia expresses hesitance to discuss Chiesa's fighting style. The two are friends and training partners back home and Siclia wants to remain that way and not betray Chiesa.
- Saturday 9 am: Cruz talks to Sicilia and tries to find out about Chiesa's favorite submissions and fighting style. Sicilia tells Cruz he is uncomfortable talking about it.
- Sunday 9 am: Chris Tickle has been complaining of pain in his toes. In talking with the UFC doctor, the symptoms resemble gout. The UFC doctor discusses the issue with Cruz and that tests will be performed to verify or eliminate gout as a possibility. Cruz is not convinced that the problem child is having any real problems and not Tickle disliking the training regimen. Tickle says it is not the training that he is having a problem with.
- Monday 1:30 pm: During training, Faber and Chiesa work on takedowns, grappling, and submissions.
- Tuesday 3 pm: During training, Tickle complains of stomach pains and Cruz tells him to work through them. In an interview, Cruz explains that he is getting tired of Tickle's excuses not to train.
- Wednesday 1 pm: Tickle visits the hospital to get the results of the gout tests performed. The tests have come back negative for gout.
- Thursday 4 pm: At the official weigh-ins, Larsen weighs 154 pounds (70 kg) and Chiesa weighs 155.5 pounds (70.5 kg).
- Live: Late in the first round, Chiesa kneed Larsen in the head while Larsen had a knee touching the mat. The referee called for a timeout to allow Larsen to recover from the illegal blow and deducted a point from Chiesa.
- Michael Chiesa defeats Jeremy Larsen by unanimous decision after two rounds.
  - Team Faber retains control of the fight pick. Faber announces the fight the following week will be between Tickle and Joe Proctor.

Episode 6: "Dog with no Bark" (April 13, 2012)

- Friday: It was discussed that Tickle was drunk during the previous week's fight. In the locker room, Tickle was laughing and making jokes about his just announced fight with Proctor. Cruz gets upset with Tickle's attitude and tells him to keep his mouth shut for the next week.
- Saturday 10:30 am: Mike Rio complains of pains in one of his knees and having difficulties moving it. Rio and Lawrence have a discussion about the lifetime of a mixed martial arts fighter.
  - During practice, Cruz apologizes to Tickle for his comments the night before. The head coach explained that he was upset due to Jeremy Larsen's loss. Cruz says he wants Tickle to be himself.
  - Cruz pairs Justin Lawrence with Rio during practice and tells Lawrence not to throw spin kicks at Rio, although he does. Rio complains of the kicks feeling they were dangerous for practice. It causes Rio and Lawrence to become rougher with each other during the training session. To retaliate, Rio takes Lawrence down and submits him several times.
- Saturday 5 pm: While Team Faber is at practice, Tickle sets up a practical joke by placing a container of water on the front door to the Ultimate Fighter House. When Team Faber returns from practice, Proctor walks into the door and the container of water spills onto his head. Proctor laughs and believes it is a funny joke.
- Sunday 11:30 am: The fighters discuss being away from their families and friends during Easter Sunday. Tickle cooks a turkey for the entire house and the fighters spend time outside with a makeshift Slip 'n Slide.
- Thursday 4 pm: At the official weigh-ins, Tickle weighs in at 153 pounds (69 kg) while eating a slice of pizza and Proctor weighs 155 pounds (70 kg).
- Live: Joe Proctor defeats Chris Tickle by submission (rear naked choke) at 4:42 in the first round.
  - Team Faber retains control of the fight pick. Faber announces the fight for the following week to be John Cofer against Vinc Pichel.

Episode 7

- Vinc Pichel defeats John Cofer by submission (arm triangle choke) at :44 in the third round.

Episode 8

- Chris Saunders defeats Sam Sicilia by split decision after two rounds.

Episode 9

- The Coaches' Challenge is presented by White and it is sponsored by the United States Marine Corps.
- The coaches are to climb a 20-foot high rope, shoot five targets with a handgun, flip tractor tires, shoot targets 50 and 70 feet away with an assault rifle, run carrying training dummies, shoot targets with a rifle again, run carrying 35 lbs of ammunition, and shoot a target with a grenade launcher.
- Cruz starts off strong as he was faster to climb the rope, but his rival eventually catches up. Faber is quicker to shoot the target with the grenade launcher and wins the Coaches' Challenge.
- Andy Ogle defeats Mike Rio by submission (rear naked choke) at 4:19 in the second round.

Episode 10

- James Vick defeats Joe Proctor by unanimous decision after two rounds.
- Michael Chiesa defeats Justin Lawrence by TKO (punches) at 1:02 in the third round.
- In the last moments of the fight, Chiesa secured a full mount position on Lawrence.

Episode 11

- Vinc Pichel defeats Chris Saunders by majority decision after two rounds.
- Al Iaquinta defeats Andy Ogle by TKO (punches) at 4:44 in the first round.

Episode 12

- Michael Chiesa defeats James Vick by TKO (strikes) at 1:55 in the second round.
- Al Iaquinta defeats Vinc Pichel by unanimous decision after two rounds.
- The finalists are now announced to be Chiesa and Iaquinta, both of Team Faber.

=== Episode list ===
No.	Title	Viewers (thousands)	Broadcast date	Advancing fighter
1	"Live Premiere"	1,300	March 9, 2012	N/A (Elimination rounds)
2	"Embrace the War"	1,100	March 16, 2012	James Vick
3	"Old School vs. New School"	1,200	March 23, 2012	Justin Lawrence
4	"All the Pressure"	1,100	March 30, 2012	Al Iaquinta
5	"That Miserable Feeling"	947	April 6, 2012	Michael Chiesa
6	"Dog with no Bark"	1,000	April 13, 2012	Joe Proctor
7	"Weather the Storm"	1,000	April 20, 2012	Vinc Pichel
8	"The Lions Den"	929	April 27, 2012	Chris Saunders
9	"Become That Hero"	954	May 4, 2012	Andy Ogle
10	"So Real, It's Unreal"	948	May 11, 2012	James Vick & Michael Chiesa
11	"Like a Spartan"	821	May 18, 2012	Vinc Pichel & Al Iaquinta
12	"Reality Check"	875	May 25, 2012	Michael Chiesa & Al Iaquinta
13	"Live Finale"	TBA	June 1, 2012	Michael Chiesa

== Tournament bracket ==
Preliminary Round
Joe Proctor	SUB
Chris Tickle	1
Daron Cruickshank	1
James Vick	KO
Michael Chiesa	UD
Jeremy Larsen	2
Cristiano Marcello	2
Justin Lawrence	KO
Chris Saunders	SD
Sam Sicilia	2
John Cofer	3
Vinc Pichel	SUB
Al Iaquinta	SD
Myles Jury	3
Andy Ogle	SUB
Mike Rio	2

Quarter-finals
Joe Proctor	2
James Vick	UD
Michael Chiesa	TKO
Justin Lawrence	3
Chris Saunders	2
Vinc Pichel	MD
Al Iaquinta	TKO
Andy Ogle	1

Semi-finals
James Vick	2
Michael Chiesa	TKO
Vinc Pichel	2
Al Iaquinta	UD

Finale
Michael Chiesa	SUB
Al Iaquinta	1

Legend
	Team Cruz
	Team Faber
UD	Unanimous Decision
MD	Majority Decision
SD	Split Decision
SUB	Submission
(T) KO	(Technical) Knockout

Fighters were awarded $25,000 bonuses. Fans chose the winners of the season bonuses.

- Fight of the Season: Myles Jury vs. Al Iaquinta
- Knockout of the Season: Al Iaquinta
- Submission of the Season: Joe Proctor

== The Ultimate Fighter 15 Finale ==
The Ultimate Fighter: Live Finale
- The poster for The Ultimate Fighter: Live Finale
- Promotion: Ultimate Fighting Championship
- Date: June 1, 2012
- Venue: Palms Casino Resort
- City: Las Vegas, Nevada
- Attendance: 1,628
- Total gate: $195,250

Event chronology
UFC 146: dos Santos vs. Mir	The Ultimate Fighter: Live Finale	UFC on FX: Johnson vs. McCall 2

The Ultimate Fighter: Live Finale (also known as The Ultimate Fighter 15 Finale) was a mixed martial arts event to be held by the Ultimate Fighting Championship. It took place on June 1, 2012 at the Palms Casino Resort in Las Vegas, Nevada.

=== Background ===
Featured were the finalists from The Ultimate Fighter: Live – Team Cruz vs Team Faber in the Lightweight division.

A rematch between Ian McCall and Demetrious Johnson for the first round of the tournament to crown the first UFC Flyweight Champion was initially reported for this event. However, it was rescheduled for UFC on FX: Johnson vs. McCall.

Byron Bloodworth was scheduled to face John Albert at the event. However, Bloodworth was forced out of the bout and replaced by promotional newcomer Erik Pérez.

=== Results ===
Main card (FX)
Weight class				Method	Round	Time	Notes
Welterweight	Martin Kampmann	def.	Jake Ellenberger	KO (knees)	2	1:40
Lightweight	Michael Chiesa	def.	Al Iaquinta	Technical Submission (rear-naked choke)	1	2:47	(Note: TUF: Live Lightweight Tournament final)
Featherweight	Charles Oliveira	def.	Jonathan Brookins	Submission (guillotine choke)	2	2:42
Featherweight	Max Holloway	def.	Pat Schilling	Decision (unanimous) (30–27, 30–27, 30–27)	3	5:00
Lightweight	Justin Lawrence	def.	John Cofer	KO (head kick)	3	0:19
Preliminary card (Fuel TV)
Lightweight	Daron Cruickshank	def.	Chris Tickle	Decision (unanimous) (29–27, 29–27, 29–27)	3	5:00	(Note: Tickle had 1 point deducted in round 1 for an illegal upkick.)
Lightweight	Myles Jury	def.	Chris Saunders	Submission (guillotine choke)	1	4:03	(Note: This bout aired on the broadcast following the Kampmann vs Ellenberger bout.)
Lightweight	Sam Sicilia	def.	Cristiano Marcello	TKO (punches)	2	2:53
Lightweight	Joe Proctor	def.	Jeremy Larsen	TKO (knee and punches)	1	1:59	(Note: This bout aired on the broadcast following the Jury vs Saunders bout.)
Preliminary Card (Facebook)
Bantamweight	Erik Pérez	def.	John Albert	Submission (armbar)	1	4:18

=== Bonuses ===
The following fighters received $40,000 bonuses.

- Fight of the Night: Justin Lawrence vs. John Cofer
- Knockout of the Night: Martin Kampmann and Justin Lawrence
- Submission of the Night: Michael Chiesa

=== Reported payout ===
The following is the reported payout to the fighters as reported to the Nevada State Athletic Commission. It does not include sponsor money and also does not include the UFC's traditional "fight night" bonuses.

- Martin Kampmann: $84,000 (includes $42,000 win bonus) def. Jake Ellenberger: $42,000
- Michael Chiesa: $16,000 (includes $8,000 win bonus) def. Al Iaquinta: $8,000
- Charles Oliveira: $32,000 (includes $16,000 win bonus) def. Jonathan Brookins: $15,000
- Max Holloway: $12,000 (includes $6,000 win bonus) def. Pat Schilling: $6,000
- Justin Lawrence: $16,000 (includes $8,000 win bonus) def. John Cofer: $8,000
- Daron Cruickshank: $16,000 (includes $8,000 win bonus) def. Chris Tickle: $8,000
- Myles Jury: $16,000 (includes $8,000 win bonus) def. Chris Saunders: $8,000
- Sam Sicilia: $16,000 (includes $8,000 win bonus) def. Christiano Marcello: $8,000
- Joe Proctor: $16,000 (includes $8,000 win bonus) def. Jeremy Larsen: $8,000
- Érik Pérez: $12,000 (includes $6,000 win bonus) def. John Albert: $8,000 ^

^Although not reflected in the NSAC paperwork, both Pérez and Albert received win bonuses

== See also ==
- The Ultimate Fighter
- List of current UFC fighters
- List of UFC events
- 2012 in UFC
