= Andy Enz =

American mixed martial arts fighter

- Born: August 15, 1991 (age 35); Anchorage, Alaska, United States
- Other names: Tank Mode; Lionheart
- Height: 6 ft 3 in (191 cm)
- Weight: 186 lb (84 kg; 13 st 4 lb)
- Division: Light Heavyweight; Middleweight
- Reach: 78.0
- Fighting out of: Anchorage, Alaska, United States
- Team: Gracie Barra Alaska
- Years active: 2010-2015

Mixed martial arts record
- Total: 14
- Wins: 10
- By knockout: 1
- By submission: 7
- By decision: 2
- Losses: 4
- By knockout: 1
- By decision: 3

Other information
- Mixed martial arts record from Sherdog

Andy Enz (born August 15, 1991) is an American mixed martial artist who most recently competed in the Middleweight division of the Ultimate Fighting Championship.

== Background ==
Born and raised in Anchorage, Alaska, Enz began wrestling at the age of four and began boxing from a young age, under the tutelage of his father. At the age of 14, he began training in Brazilian jiu-jitsu. A graduate of Service High School, he had a fourth-place finish during his senior season competing at 215 lbs.

== Mixed martial arts career ==
=== Early career ===
Enz began his professional career in 2010, as a 17-year-old high school senior. After compiling a record of 6-1, he was invited to compete on The Ultimate Fighter: Team Jones vs. Team Sonnen.

=== The Ultimate Fighter ===
After making it through the tryouts, Enz faced Uriah Hall in the preliminary bout to get into the house and make it to the final cast. Enz lost a unanimous decision, breaking his arm in the process but still managing to make it to a decision.

=== Ultimate Fighting Championship ===
After earning three consecutive first-round submission wins on the regional scene in Alaska, Enz was signed by the UFC.

Enz made his promotional debut against Clint Hester at UFC 169 on February 2, 2015. He lost via unanimous decision.

Enz returned to face Marcelo Guimaraes at UFC Fight Night: Swanson vs. Stephens. He lost again via split decision.

Enz then faced Thiago Santos at UFC 183. He was defeated via TKO from a body kick and follow up punches in the first round and subsequently released from the promotion.

== Mixed martial arts record ==
Professional record breakdown
14 matches	10 wins	4 losses
By knockout	1	1
By submission	7	0
By decision	2	3

Res.	Record	Opponent	Method	Event	Date	Round	Time	Location	Notes
Loss	10-4	Thiago Santos	TKO (body kick and punches)	UFC 183: Silva vs. Diaz	January 31, 2015	1	1:56	Las Vegas, Nevada, United States	
Loss	10-3	Marcelo Guimarães	Decision (split)	UFC Fight Night: Swanson vs. Stephens	June 28, 2014	3	5:00	San Antonio, Texas, United States	
Loss	10-2	Clint Hester	Decision (unanimous)	UFC 169: Barao vs. Faber II	February 1, 2014	3	5:00	Newark, New Jersey, United States	
Win	10-1	Mike Fannon	Submission (north-south choke)	Alaska FC 101: Tank Mode vs. Cannon	September 18, 2013	1	0:58	Anchorage, Alaska, United States	
Win	9-1	Chris Cuff	Submission (D'Arce choke)	Alaska FC 99: Spring Beatings	April 10, 2013	1	1:13	Anchorage, Alaska, United States	
Win	8-1	Thomas Ide	TKO (submission to punches)	Alaska FC 98: Heavyweights Collide	March 12, 2013	1	0:40	Anchorage, Alaska, United States	
Loss	7-1	Julio Paulino	Decision (unanimous)	Alaska FC 91: Great North Grand Prix 2	April 11, 2012	3	5:00	Anchorage, Alaska, United States	Alaska FC 91 Grand Prix Final.
Win	7-0	Stephen Waalkes	Submission (armbar)	Alaska FC 91: Great North Grand Prix 2	April 11, 2012	1	N/A	Anchorage, Alaska, United States	Alaska FC 91 Grand Prix Semifinal.
Win	6-0	Tommie Matthews	KO (head kick)	Alaska FC 91: Great North Grand Prix 2	April 11, 2012	1	N/A	Anchorage, Alaska, United States	Alaska FC 91 Grand Prix Quarterfinal.
Win	5-0	Nic Herron-Webb	Decision (split)	Alaska FC 86	November 16, 2011	5	5:00	Anchorage, Alaska, United States	Defended the Alaska FC Middleweight Championship.
Win	4-0	Tyler Milner	Decision (split)	Alaska FC 77: Hardcore Harvest	November 17, 2010	5	5:00	Anchorage, Alaska, United States	Won the Alaska FC Middleweight Championship.
Win	3-0	Chase Jensen	Submission (choke)	Alaska FC: Fight for Freedom 1	September 10, 2010	2	N/A	Anchorage, Alaska, United States	
Win	2-0	Rod Pucak	Submission (rear-naked choke)	Alaska FC 69: Proving Ground	March 9, 2010	1	2:27	Anchorage, Alaska, United States	
Win	1-0	Tommie Matthews	Submission (americana)	Alaska FC 68	February 10, 2010	1	1:26	Anchorage, Alaska, United States	

== See also ==
- List of male mixed martial artists
