= Iaquinta =

Iaquinta is an Italian surname meaning "hyacinth". Notable people with the surname include:

- Al Iaquinta (born 1987), American mixed martial artist
- Vincenzo Iaquinta (born 1979), Italian footballer
