= Clint Hester =

American mixed martial arts fighter

- Born: November 21, 1986 (age 39); Atlanta, Georgia, United States
- Other names: Headbussa
- Height: 6 ft 2 in (1.88 m)
- Weight: 205 lb (93 kg; 14.6 st)
- Division: Light Heavyweight; Middleweight
- Reach: 78.0 in (198 cm)
- Stance: Orthodox
- Fighting out of: Boca Raton, Florida, United States
- Team: Blackzilians
- Rank: Purple belt in Brazilian Jiu-Jitsu under Ranieri Paiva
- Years active: 2008–present

Professional boxing record
- Total: 7
- Wins: 3
- By knockout: 2
- Losses: 3
- By knockout: 2
- Draws: 1

Mixed martial arts record
- Total: 17
- Wins: 11
- By knockout: 7
- By submission: 1
- By decision: 3
- Losses: 6
- By knockout: 2
- By submission: 3
- By decision: 1

Other information
- Boxing record from BoxRec
- Mixed martial arts record from Sherdog

Clint Hester (born November 21, 1986) is an American professional boxer and mixed martial artist who last competed in 2016. A professional competitor since 2008, he fought in the UFC and was a contestant on The Ultimate Fighter: Team Jones vs. Team Sonnen.

== Background ==
Hester is from Atlanta, Georgia. He often got into fights growing up, but was not an instigator rather defended several of his friends. Hester, who played football, had planned to play college football but decided to take a different path when he was not offered a scholarship.

== Boxing career ==
Hester thought of joining the military after high school, but ultimately chose to start training in boxing and was coached by Willie D'Antignac, amassing an amateur record of 13–3. Hester turned professional in 2007 and lost his first bout by first-round knockout. Hester fought six more times until his final fight in 2013. When Hester's boxing gym closed down he searched for another gym to train at before finding X3 Sports MMA. Hester decided to make the switch to MMA.

== Mixed martial arts career ==
=== Early career ===
Hester started his professional MMA career out at 2-0 before being offered a spot in an upcoming local Grand Prix. Hester won his opening round matchup via knockout. He lost in the next round of the tournament to future Bellator Fighting Championships welterweight title contender, Douglas Lima, via unanimous decision.

=== The Ultimate Fighter ===
In January 2013, it was announced that Hester was selected for The Ultimate Fighter: Team Jones vs. Team Sonnen. Hester defeated Fraser Opie by decision to earn his way into the house. He was then selected as Jon Jones's first pick and second pick overall.

Hester had his preliminary fight against Team Sonnen's Jimmy Quinlan. Hester was upset in the second round via submission. Though Hester was a candidate for the wildcard, his coach, Jon Jones, ultimately picked Bubba McDaniel.

=== Ultimate Fighting Championship ===
Despite losing in the preliminaries, Hester was given a fight at the finale. Hester faced Bristol Marunde at The Ultimate Fighter 17 Finale. Hester won the back-and-forth fight via KO from a standing elbow in the third round.

Hester was expected to face Cezar Ferreira on August 3, 2013, at UFC 163. However, on July 18, it was announced he was taken out of the bout due to an injury.

For his second UFC fight, Hester faced Dylan Andrews on December 7, 2013, at UFC Fight Night 33. He won the fight via TKO due to injury after Andrews dislocated his shoulder in the second round.

Hester faced Andy Enz on February 1, 2014, at UFC 169. He won the fight by unanimous decision.

Hester faced Antônio Braga Neto on June 28, 2014, at UFC Fight Night: Swanson vs. Stephens. He won the back and forth fight via split decision.

Hester faced Robert Whittaker November 8, 2014 at UFC Fight Night 55. He lost the fight via TKO in the second round; the first loss of his UFC career. Despite the loss, Hester was awarded his first Fight of the Night bonus award for the bout.

Hester was expected to face Luke Barnatt on April 4, 2015, at UFC Fight Night 63. However, Hester pulled out of the fight in early March due to a broken foot.

Hester faced Vitor Miranda on August 1, 2015, at UFC 190. He lost the fight by TKO in the second round due to punches and elbows.

Hester next faced Marcos Rogério de Lima in a light heavyweight bout on April 23, 2016, at UFC 197. He lost the one sided fight via submission in the first round.

On June 3 Hester was released from the promotion.

== Championships and accomplishments ==
- Ultimate Fighting Championship
  - Fight of the Night (One time)

== Mixed martial arts record ==
Professional record breakdown
17 matches	11 wins	6 losses
By knockout	7	2
By submission	1	3
By decision	3	1

Res.	Record	Opponent	Method	Event	Date	Round	Time	Location	Notes
Loss	11–6	Marcos Rogério de Lima	Submission (arm-triangle choke)	UFC 197	April 23, 2016	1	4:35	Las Vegas, Nevada, United States	Light Heavyweight bout.
Loss	11–5	Vitor Miranda	TKO (punches and elbows)	UFC 190	August 1, 2015	2	2:38	Rio de Janeiro, Brazil	
Loss	11–4	Robert Whittaker	TKO (knee and punches)	UFC Fight Night: Rockhold vs. Bisping	November 8, 2014	2	2:43	Sydney, Australia	Fight of the Night.
Win	11–3	Antônio Braga Neto	Decision (split)	UFC Fight Night: Swanson vs. Stephens	June 28, 2014	3	5:00	San Antonio, Texas, United States	
Win	10–3	Andy Enz	Decision (unanimous)	UFC 169	February 1, 2014	3	5:00	Newark, New Jersey, United States	
Win	9–3	Dylan Andrews	TKO (doctor stoppage)	UFC Fight Night: Hunt vs. Bigfoot	December 7, 2013	2	5:00	Brisbane, Australia	
Win	8–3	Bristol Marunde	KO (elbow)	The Ultimate Fighter: Team Jones vs. Team Sonnen Finale	April 13, 2013	3	3:53	Las Vegas, Nevada, United States	Return to Middleweight.
Win	7–3	Patrick Miller	TKO (punches)	Wild Bill's Fight Night 47	June 23, 2012	1	3:41	Duluth, Georgia, United States	
Win	6–3	Rashaun Spencer	TKO (punches)	Tabernacle Fight Party	March 3, 2012	2	1:27	Atlanta, Georgia, United States	
Win	5–3	Tomar Washington	Decision (unanimous)	King of the Ring 3	May 14, 2011	3	5:00	Atlanta, Georgia, United States	
Loss	4–3	Cale Yarbrough	Submission (north-south choke)	Wild Bill's Fight Night 31	October 29, 2010	3	1:18	Duluth, Georgia, United States	Light Heavyweight debut.
Win	4–2	Tony Souza	Submission (punches)	Wild Bill's Fight Night 30	September 11, 2010	2	2:41	Duluth, Georgia, United States	
Loss	3–2	Roger Carroll	Submission (armbar)	Bangkok Fight Night 5	February 27, 2010	1	2:19	Atlanta, Georgia, United States	
Loss	3–1	Douglas Lima	Decision (unanimous)	Sin City Fight Club - Redline GP 2	November 13, 2009	3	5:00	Atlanta, Georgia, United States	2010 REDLINE Middleweight Grand Prix Semifinals.
Win	3–0	Aaron Johnson	KO (punches)	Sin City Fight Club - Redline GP 1	October 10, 2009	1	0:42	Atlanta, Georgia, United States	2010 REDLINE Grand Prix Quarterfinals.
Win	2–0	Dymond Jones	TKO (punches)	Soco de Boss	May 30, 2009	2	4:27	Atlanta, Georgia, United States	
Win	1–0	Aaron Johnson	TKO (doctor stoppage)	Wild Bill's Fight Night 17	November 8, 2008	1	1:18	Atlanta, Georgia, United States	

== Professional boxing record ==
3 Wins (2 knockouts, 1 decision), 3 Losses, 1 Draw
Res.	Record	Opponent	Type	Rd., Time	Date	Location	Notes
Win	3–3–1	(United States) Gary Lavender	TKO	4 (4), 2:35	2012-07-08	(Georgia (U.S. state)) Grand Ballroom, Atlanta, Georgia, United States	
Win	2–3–1	(United States) Tobias Rice	Decision (Unanimous)	4 (4), 3:00	2011-12-02	(Georgia (U.S. state)) World Congress Center, Atlanta, Georgia, United States	
Loss	1–3–1	(United States) Alexis Santos	Decision (Split)	4 (4), 3:00	2011-02-26	(Georgia (U.S. state)) Club Europe, Atlanta, Georgia, United States	
Draw	1–2–1	(United States) Jabir Abdul Basit	Draw	4 (4), 3:00	2009-07-03	(Georgia (U.S. state)) Atlanta, Georgia, United States	
Loss	1–2–0	(Aruba) Evan Nedd	TKO	3 (4), 1:52	2009-01-30	(United States Virgin Islands) UVI Sports & Fitness Center, Charlotte Amalie, U.S. Virgin Islands	
Win	1–1–0	(United States) Jeremy Thomas	KO	2 (4), 0:46	2008-05-09	(Georgia (U.S. state)) Center Stage, Atlanta, Georgia, United States	
loss	0–1–0	(Puerto Rico) Francisco Alvarez	KO	1 (4), 2:26	2007-09-14	Kissimmee Civic Center, Kissimmee, Florida, United States	

== See also ==
- List of male mixed martial artists
