= UFC Fight Night: Swanson vs. Stephens =

UFC mixed martial arts event in 2014

- The poster for UFC Fight Night: Swanson vs. Stephens
- Promotion: Ultimate Fighting Championship
- Date: June 28, 2014
- Venue: AT&T Center
- City: San Antonio, Texas
- Attendance: 9,227
- Total gate: $728,358

Event chronology
| UFC Fight Night: Te Huna vs. Marquardt | UFC Fight Night: Swanson vs. Stephens | UFC 175: Weidman vs. Machida |

UFC Fight Night: Swanson vs. Stephens (also known as UFC Fight Night 44) was a mixed martial arts event held at the AT&T Center in San Antonio, Texas.

== Background ==
The event was the first that the organization has hosted in San Antonio. Zuffa hosted a World Extreme Cagefighting event, WEC 43, there in 2009.

The event was headlined by a featherweight bout between Cub Swanson and Jeremy Stephens.

Rani Yahya was expected to face Johnny Bedford in a rematch from their bout at UFC Fight Night 39. However, Yahya was forced out of the bout and was replaced by Cody Gibson.

A welterweight bout between Sean Spencer and Luiz Dutra was official for this card but had to be cancelled due to an injury.

Myles Jury was scheduled to face Abel Trujillo at the event. However, Jury pulled out of the bout with an injury and was replaced by Francisco Treviño. Subsequently, Treviño's originally scheduled opponent on the card, Joe Ellenberger, was briefly linked to bouts with newcomers Johnny Case and Bryan Barberena. However, Case and Barberena were removed just days after being announced as well and were eventually replaced by another newcomer James Moontasri. Then on June 9, Treviño pulled out of the bout and Trujillo was removed from the card entirely.

Ray Borg was scheduled to face Ryan Benoit at the event. However, on June 18 it was announced that Benoit had to pull out of the fight due to injury and was replaced by promotional newcomer Shane Howell.

Co-main event fighter Kelvin Gastelum initially weighed in over the 171 pound welterweight limit at 173 pounds. His subsequent efforts to make weight over the next two hours failed, hence he was forced to surrender 20 percent of his purse to opponent Nico Musoke.

== Results ==
Main Card (Fox Sports 1)
| Weight class | | | | Method | Round | Time | Notes |
|---|---|---|---|---|---|---|---|
| Featherweight | Cub Swanson | def. | Jeremy Stephens | Decision (unanimous) (49–46, 49–46, 48–47) | 5 | 5:00 |
| Catchweight (172.75 lb) | Kelvin Gastelum | def. | Nico Musoke | Decision (unanimous) (29–28, 29–28, 29–28) | 3 | 5:00 |
| Middleweight | Cezar Ferreira | def. | Andrew Craig | Decision (unanimous) (29–28, 29–28, 30–27) | 3 | 5:00 |
| Featherweight | Ricardo Lamas | def. | Hacran Dias | Decision (unanimous) (30–27, 30–27, 29–28) | 3 | 5:00 |
| Middleweight | Clint Hester | def. | Antônio Braga Neto | Decision (split) (28–29, 29–28, 29–28) | 3 | 5:00 |
| Lightweight | Joe Ellenberger | def. | James Moontasri | Decision (split) (28–29, 29–28, 29–28) | 3 | 5:00 |
Preliminary card (Fox Sports 1)
| Lightweight | Carlos Diego Ferreira | def. | Colton Smith | Submission (rear-naked choke) | 1 | 0:38 |
| Bantamweight | Cody Gibson | def. | Johnny Bedford | TKO (punches) | 1 | 0:38 |
| Middleweight | Marcelo Guimarães | def. | Andy Enz | Decision (split) (27–30, 29–28, 29–28) | 3 | 5:00 |
| Flyweight | Ray Borg | def. | Shane Howell | Submission (rear-naked choke) | 1 | 2:17 |
Preliminary card (UFC Fight Pass)
| Heavyweight | Aleksei Oleinik | def. | Anthony Hamilton | Submission (neck crank) | 1 | 2:18 |

== Bonus awards ==
The following fighters received $50,000 bonuses:

- Fight of the Night: Cub Swanson vs. Jeremy Stephens
- Performance of the Night: Ray Borg and Carlos Diego Ferreira

== See also ==
- List of UFC events
- 2014 in UFC
