= Dylan Andrews =

New Zealander mixed martial arts fighter

- Born: 15 November 1979 (age 47); Wellington, New Zealand
- Other names: The Villain
- Height: 6 ft 1 in (1.85 m)
- Weight: 185 lb (84 kg; 13.2 st)
- Division: Welterweight; Middleweight
- Reach: 74 in (188 cm)
- Stance: Orthodox
- Fighting out of: Gold Coast, Australia
- Team: Potential Unlimited MMA (PUMMA); Heartbreak conditioning
- Years active: 2006–present

Mixed martial arts record
- Total: 30
- Wins: 18
- By knockout: 13
- By submission: 3
- By decision: 2
- Losses: 11
- By knockout: 4
- By submission: 5
- By decision: 2
- No contests: 1

Other information
- Mixed martial arts record from Sherdog

Dylan Andrews (born 15 November 1979) is a mixed martial artist from New Zealand who most recently competed in the Welterweight division of Absolute Championship Berkut. A professional competitor since 2006, he has formerly competed in the UFC, and was a semi-finalist on FX's The Ultimate Fighter: Team Jones vs. Team Sonnen.

== Early life and background ==
Dylan Andrews was born on 15 November 1979 in Wellington, New Zealand and is of Māori descent. He grew up around drugs and alcohol abuse and he was bullied at school. In his early years, Dylan played many sports, including rugby, cricket and squash.

He lived in Whakatāne, New Zealand and Woburn, New Zealand where he went to Hutt Valley High School between 1996 and 1997.

Education wasn’t a very high priority for Dylan or his family. He left school without qualifications and became a laborer; he also worked in an office.

Andrews moved to Australia's Gold Coast in 2003.

== Mixed martial arts career ==
=== Early career ===
Dylan started his mixed martial arts (MMA) training in 2004 in the Lion’s Den Academy in Sydney, Australia, having stumbled into the Den while looking for Ultimate Fighting Championship (UFC) videos. He had his first professional MMA fight some two years later on 7 July 2006 where he beat Adam Narnst by TKO after only 52 seconds of the first round.

Over the next year and a half he won his next five fights inside the first two rounds.

Dylan had his first loss on 15 February 2008 to Brian Ebersole who at the time had won 37 of his 52 professional fights.

Over the next few years, Dylan slowly built his reputation as a tough and dedicated fighter. He defeated the likes of UFC fighter and The Ultimate Fighter Season 4 contestant, Shonie Carter. He refused to tap in his fight against Jesse Taylor when in a guillotine choke, the referee had to stop the fight as Andrews was unconscious at Australian Fighting Championship (AFC) 1.

He has fought in a number of inaugural fights, such as the first Cage Fighting Championship, Legend Fighting Championship and Australian Fighting Championship.

Dylan has a reputation as a tough and dedicated fighter: he refused to tap in his November 2010 fight against Jesse Taylor when in a guillotine choke, the referee had to stop the fight as Andrews was unconscious and he had a round three knockout win over Papy Abedi in August 2013, even though he had dislocated his shoulder in the first round.

=== The Ultimate Fighter ===
Dylan tried three times to get onto The Ultimate Fighter, an American reality television series and MMA competition produced by the FX Network and the UFC. He failed to make it onto the thirteenth and fifteenth season of the show and the Australian-based series The Ultimate Fighter: The Smashes after underperforming at 170 pounds (77 kg). However, he didn’t give up and his persistence paid off when in January 2013, Andrews was announced as a cast member of The Ultimate Fighter: Team Jones vs. Team Sonnen (also known as TUF 17).

Dylan Andrews became the first Māori MMA fighter to compete in The Ultimate Fighter.

He won his way into the house by defeating Tim Williams by unanimous decision. However, he failed to impress either judge—he was the last pick for Team Jones and was the last pick overall.

Andrews fought Zak Cummings in the preliminary round and was victorious with a majority decision win after two rounds. Andrews next fought overall first pick, Luke Barnatt, in the quarter-finals. He defeated Barnatt in the third round via TKO due to punches. The bout was declared 'Fight of the Season'.

Andrews lost in the semi-finals to Uriah Hall via TKO due to punches in the second round.

=== Ultimate Fighting Championship ===
Andrews' first UFC fight was at The Ultimate Fighter 17 Finale against Jimmy Quinlan, who he defeated via TKO in the first round. Andrews won US$16,000 in his debut UFC fight.

Andrews next fought Papy Abedi on 28 August 2013 at UFC Fight Night 27. After being controlled for the first two rounds, Andrews mounted a comeback and won via knockout in the third round.

Andrews faced fellow The Ultimate Fighter 17 competitor Clint Hester on 7 December 2013 at UFC Fight Night 33. He lost the fight via TKO due to injury after dislocating his shoulder in the second round.

During his injury, Andrews and Ross Pearson helped promote UFC Fight Night: Te Huna vs. Marquardt through autograph signings, press conferences and Q&A sessions.

Andrews next faced Sam Alvey on 8 November 2014 at UFC Fight Night 55. He lost the fight via knockout due to hitting his head on the canvas during an attempted takedown and follow up punches from Alvey.

Andrews faced Brad Scott on 10 May 2015 at UFC Fight Night 65. Andrews lost the fight via submission in the second round. Subsequently, Andrews was released from the organisation.

=== Post UFC ===
Andrews rematched with Papy Abedi on 1 April 2017 at Superior Challenge 15 in Stockholm, Sweden. He won the fight via knockout in round two and claimed the Middleweight Superior Challenge title.

Andrews faced Azamat Amagov on 9 December 2017 at Absolute Championship Berkut 76 in Gold Coast, Australia. He lost the fight via TKO in the second round.

== Sponsorships and gyms ==
Dylan has sponsorships with Lonsdale London (Australia), who included him in their Real Fighters team, as well as with TapouT, ASN, Muscle Lab, Line Break Compression, Cocktail And Dreams and AST Performance.

Andrews started his MMA training in the Sydney Lion’s Den Academy training under Luke Pezzutti. He moved to the Five Rings Dojo, Gold Coast, Australia in 2008. He now fights out of the Heartbreak Conditioning and PUMMA gyms on the Gold Coast, training under Vince Perry.

Dylan is known for his dedication in the gym:

I give big props to guys who work really hard. Dylan Andrews is one of those guys. No one hustles harder than that guy ... no one deserves (success) more than that guy.

— Soa 'The Hulk' Palelei, August 2, 2013.

== Fighting style ==
Dylan is a boxer and a wrestler with an aggressive, dynamic fighting style. He is noted for almost never leaving a fight, with only two of his 21 professional fights going the distance.

== Personal life ==
Dylan Andrews and his partner, Tracey, have a son, Tyrese, and a daughter, Nevaeh. He likes to listen to Marvin Gaye, Bob Marley and Jack Johnson.

Andrews' nickname is the Villain, but he says he is nothing of the sort:

The coach came up with it because it rhymed with my name ... but I think I carried myself well at all times. I want it to be a positive thing, so I was always thinking about that.

— Dylan Andrews, January 19, 2013.

== Championships and accomplishments ==
- Ultimate Fighting Championship
  - The Ultimate Fighter 17 Fight of the Season
  - First New Zealander to compete on the Ultimate Fighter
- Nitro MMA
  - Nitro Middleweight Championship (One time)
- Brazilian jiu-jitsu
  - New South Wales State jiu-jitsu Champion (2005, 2006 and 2007)

== Mixed martial arts record ==
Professional record breakdown
29 matches	18 wins	11 losses
By knockout	13	4
By submission	3	5
By decision	2	2

Res.	Record	Opponent	Method	Event	Date	Round	Time	Location	Notes
Loss	18–11 (1)	Rob Wilkinson	Submission (guillotine choke)	Australian FC 23	1 December 2019	1	3:01	Melbourne, Australia	Light Heavyweight bout.
Loss	18–10 (1)	Priscus Fogagnolo	Decision (unanimous)	All Styles Grappling: MMA Fight Night 3	14 September 2019	3	5:00	Hobart, Australia	
Loss	18–9 (1)	Nico Musoke	Decision (unanimous)	Superior Challenge 19	11 May 2019	3	5:00	Stockholm, Sweden	Lost SC Middleweight Championship.
Loss	18–8 (1)	Azamat Amagov	TKO (punches and elbows)	ACB 76: Young Eagles 23	9 December 2017	2	1:08	Gold Coast, Australia	Welterweight bout.
Win	18–7 (1)	Papy Abedi	KO (head kick)	Superior Challenge 15	1 April 2017	2	4:16	Stockholm, Sweden	Won the SC Middleweight Championship
Loss	17–7 (1)	Brad Scott	Submission (guillotine choke)	UFC Fight Night: Miocic vs. Hunt	10 May 2015	2	4:54	Adelaide, Australia	
Loss	17–6 (1)	Sam Alvey	KO (punches)	UFC Fight Night: Rockhold vs. Bisping	8 November 2014	1	2:16	Sydney, Australia	
Loss	17–5 (1)	Clint Hester	TKO (doctor stoppage)	UFC Fight Night: Hunt vs. Bigfoot	7 December 2013	2	5:00	Brisbane, Australia	Andrews dislocated his shoulder in the second round.
Win	17–4 (1)	Papy Abedi	KO (punches)	UFC Fight Night: Condit vs. Kampmann 2	28 August 2013	3	1:32	Indianapolis, Indiana, United States	
Win	16–4 (1)	Jimmy Quinlan	TKO (punches)	The Ultimate Fighter 17 Finale	13 April 2013	1	3:22	Las Vegas, Nevada, United States	
Win	15–4 (1)	Hale Vaa'sa	Decision (unanimous)	Nitro MMA 5	24 March 2012	3	5:00	Logan City, Australia	Won Nitro Middleweight Championship.
Win	14–4 (1)	Steve Thomas	TKO (retirement)	Cage FC 20	24 February 2012	1	5:00	Gold Coast, Australia	
Win	13–4 (1)	Ross Dallow	TKO (punches)	Australian FC 2	3 September 2011	1	0:57	Melbourne, Australia	
Win	12–4 (1)	Rob Giuffrida	TKO (punches)	Nitro MMA 3	9 July 2011	2	4:24	Logan City, Australia	
Loss	11–4 (1)	Jesse Taylor	Technical Submission (guillotine choke)	Australian FC 1	12 November 2010	1	2:40	Melbourne, Australia	
Loss	11–3 (1)	James Vainikolo	Submission (rear-naked choke)	Xtreme MMA 2 - ANZ vs. USA	31 July 2010	2	4:14	Sydney, Australia	
Win	11–2 (1)	Shonie Carter	Decision (unanimous)	Cage FC 13	16 April 2010	3	5:00	Gold Coast, Australia	
NC	10–2 (1)	Dorjderem Munkhbayasgala	NC (punches to the back of the head)	Legend FC 1	11 January 2010	1	0:50	Hong Kong, SAR, China	
Win	10–2	Jeff King	Submission (guillotine choke)	Cage FC 11	20 November 2009	1	4:58	Sydney, Australia	
Win	9–2	Yuji Hisamatsu	TKO (punches)	FightWorld Cup 2 - Return of the Warriors	18 April 2009	1	2:33	Nerang, Australia	
Win	8–2	Sandro Sampaio	TKO (punches)	TTCW 2 - North vs. South	22 November 2008	1	1:02	Canterbury, New Zealand	
Loss	7–2	Jacob O'Connell	Submission (anaconda choke)	Cage FC 6 - Eliminator	7 November 2008	1	0:37	Sydney, Australia	
Win	7–1	Marvin Arnold Bleau	TKO (punches)	TTCW 1 - Two Worlds Collide	24 May 2008	1	1:50	Canterbury, New Zealand	
Loss	6–1	Brian Ebersole	TKO (punches)	Cage FC 3	15 February 2008	2	4:26	Sydney, Australia	
Win	6–0	Api Hemara	Submission (rear-naked choke)	Cage FC 2	23 November 2007	2	3:15	Sydney, Australia	
Win	5–0	Kal Bacy	TKO (punches)	Cage FC 1	27 July 2007	1	1:50	Sydney, Australia	
Win	4–0	Stephen Walton	Submission (rear-naked choke)	Shooto Australia - Superfight Australia 1	26 May 2007	2	4:23	Perth, Australia	
Win	3–0	Yoann Gouaida	TKO (punches)	Warriors Realm 8	23 March 2007	2	N/A	Sunshine Coast, Australia	
Win	2–0	Lenny Kent	KO (punches)	Warriors Realm 7	4 November 2006	1	3:14	Sunshine Coast, Australia	
Win	1–0	Adam Narnst	TKO (punches)	XFC 11	7 July 2006	1	0:52	Logan Central, Australia	

=== Mixed martial arts exhibition record ===
Exhibition record breakdown		
4 matches	3 wins	1 loss
By knockout	1	1
By decision	2	0

Res.	Record	Opponent	Method	Event	Date	Round	Time	Location	Notes
Loss	3–1	Uriah Hall	TKO (punches)	TUF 17	9 April 2013 (air date)	2	4:50	Las Vegas, Nevada, United States	TUF 17 semi-final round.
Win	3–0	Luke Barnatt	TKO (punches)	TUF 17	26 March 2013 (air date)	3	1:57	Las Vegas, Nevada, United States	TUF 17 quarter-final round; Fight of the season.
Win	2–0	Zak Cummings	Decision (majority)	TUF 17	12 March 2013 (air date)	2	5:00	Las Vegas, Nevada, United States	TUF 17 preliminary round.
Win	1–0	Tim Williams	Decision (unanimous)	TUF 17	22 January 2013 (air date)	2	5:00	Las Vegas, Nevada, United States	TUF 17 elimination round.

== See also ==
- List of current UFC fighters
- List of male mixed martial artists
