= UFC Fight Night: Rockhold vs. Bisping =

UFC mixed martial arts event in 2014

- The poster for UFC Fight Night: Rockhold vs. Bisping
- Promotion: Ultimate Fighting Championship
- Date: November 8, 2014
- Venue: Allphones Arena
- City: Sydney, Australia
- Attendance: 9,904
- Total gate: $1.5 million

Event chronology
UFC 179: Aldo vs. Mendes 2	UFC Fight Night: Rockhold vs. Bisping	UFC Fight Night: Shogun vs. Saint Preux

UFC Fight Night: Rockhold vs. Bisping (also known as UFC Fight Night 55, or UFC Fight Night Sydney) was a mixed martial arts event held at the Allphones Arena in Sydney, Australia on November 8, 2014.

== Background ==
This event was the fourth event that the UFC hosted in Sydney and the sixth event to take place in Australia. The last time the UFC was in Sydney was for UFC on FX: Alves vs. Kampmann on March 3, 2012.

Ray Borg was expected to face Richie Vaculik at this event. However, Borg was forced to pull out of the event due to injury and was replaced by Neil Seery. Subsequently, Seery pulled out of that bout as well and was replaced by Louis Smolka.

Patrick Williams was expected to face Jumabieke Tuerxun at the event. However, Williams was forced out of the bout due to injury and was replaced by Marcus Brimage.

A scheduled featherweight bout between Mark Eddiva and Mike De La Torre was cancelled after both fighters suffered injuries.

Daniel Omielańczuk was expected to face Soa Palelei at this event. However, Omielańczuk was forced to pull out of this event due to injury and was replaced by Walt Harris.

Aljamain Sterling was expected to face Frankie Saenz, though Saenz was forced to withdraw from the bout. Promotional newcomer Michael Imperato was briefly linked as a replacement. However, his signing was quickly rescinded and as a result, Sterling was pulled from the event altogether.

== Results ==
Fight card (UFC Fight Pass)
Weight class				Method	Round	Time	Notes
Middleweight	Luke Rockhold	def.	Michael Bisping	Submission (guillotine choke)	2	0:57
Lightweight	Al Iaquinta	def.	Ross Pearson	TKO (punches)	2	1:39
Middleweight	Robert Whittaker	def.	Clint Hester	TKO (knee and punches)	2	2:43
Heavyweight	Soa Palelei	def.	Walt Harris	TKO (punches)	2	4:49
Preliminary card (UFC Fight Pass)
Lightweight	Jake Matthews	def.	Vagner Rocha	Technical Submission (rear-naked choke)	2	1:52
Light Heavyweight	Anthony Perosh	def.	Guto Inocente	Submission (rear-naked choke)	1	3:46
Middleweight	Sam Alvey	def.	Dylan Andrews	KO (punches)	1	2:16
Flyweight	Louis Smolka	def.	Richie Vaculik	TKO (side kick and punches)	3	0:18	(Note: Smolka did not make the 126 pound flyweight limit, weighing in at 127 pounds.)
Welterweight	Chris Clements	def.	Vik Grujic	TKO (punches)	1	3:06
Middleweight	Dan Kelly	def.	Luke Zachrich	Submission (kimura)	1	4:27
Bantamweight	Marcus Brimage	def.	Zhumabek Tursyn	KO (head kick)	1	2:58

== Bonus awards ==
The following fighters received $50,000 bonuses:

- Fight of the Night: Robert Whittaker vs. Clint Hester
- Performance of the Night: Luke Rockhold and Louis Smolka

== Aftermath ==
At the time of the event, the event broke the record of having the most finishes on a single modern UFC card with 11 finishes, for a rate of 1.000. UFC on ESPN: Santos vs. Hill and UFC Freedom 250 would also have a 100 percent finish rate too. UFC 224 later tied the record of eleven finishes on May 12, 2018, albeit with a finishing rate of 0.846. The record was subsequently matched by UFC 281 on November 12, 2022, UFC Fight Night: Imavov vs. Borralho on September 6, 2025, UFC 329 on July 11, 2026, and UFC Fight Night: Buckley vs. Malott on October 17, 2026.

The record was ultimately surpassed in August 2026 when UFC Fight Night: Medić vs. Rodriguez recorded twelve finishes.

== See also ==
- 2014 in UFC
- List of UFC events
- Mixed martial arts in Australia
