= Kelvin Gastelum =

American mixed martial artist

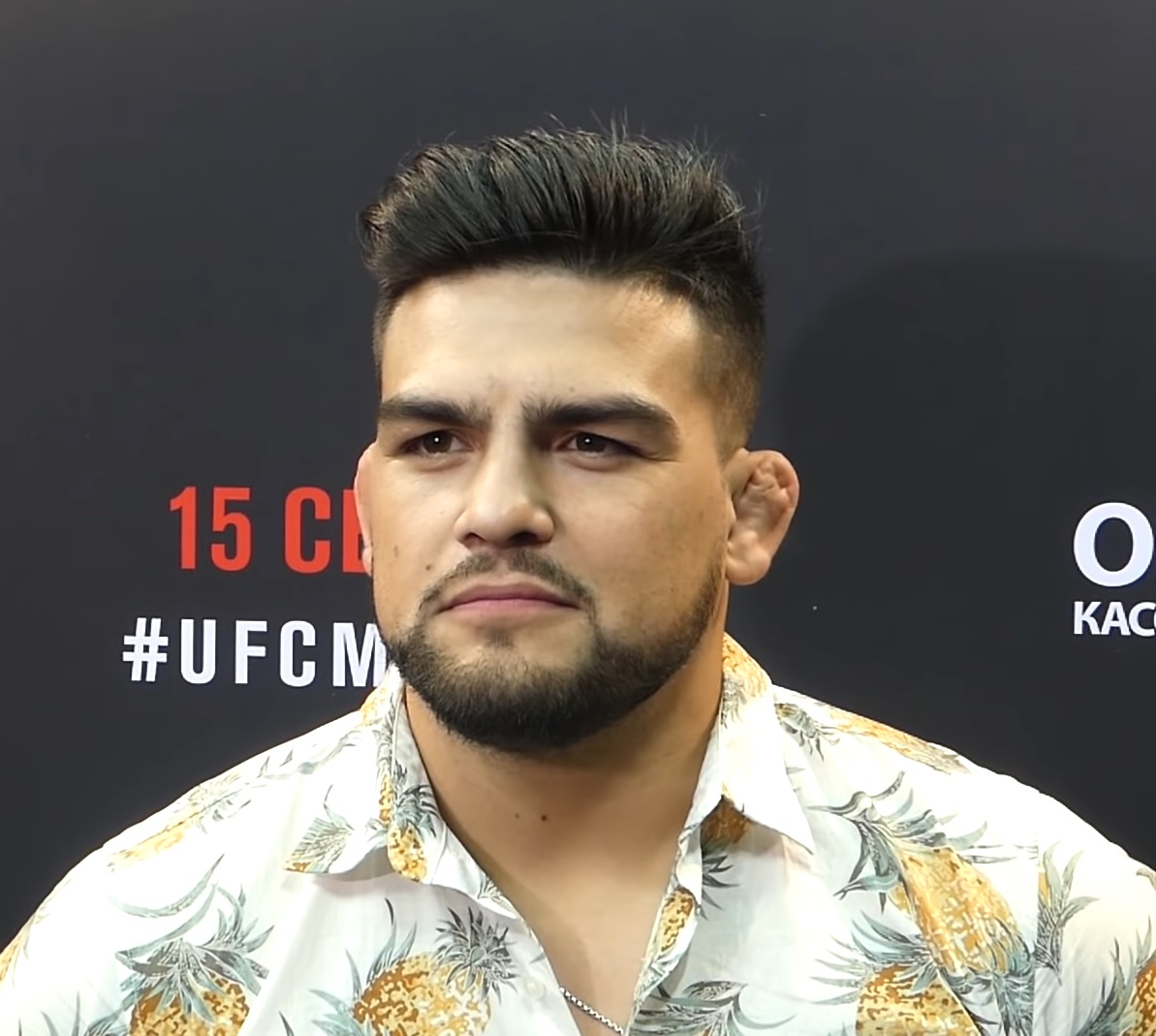
- Gastelum in September, 2018
- Born: October 24, 1991 (age 34); San Jose, California, U.S.
- Height: 5 ft 9 in (175 cm)
- Weight: 185 lb (84 kg; 13 st 3 lb)
- Division: Welterweight (2013–2016; 2023); Middleweight (2010–2013; 2016–present)
- Reach: 71 1/2 in (182 cm)
- Stance: Southpaw
- Fighting out of: Yuma, Arizona, U.S.
- Team: Kings MMA; Yuma United MMA
- Rank: Black belt in 10th Planet Jiu-Jitsu under Brian Beaumont
- Wrestling: NJCAA Wrestling
- Years active: 2010–present

Mixed martial arts record
- Total: 32
- Wins: 20
- By knockout: 6
- By submission: 5
- By decision: 9
- Losses: 11
- By submission: 4
- By decision: 7
- No contests: 1

Other information
- Mixed martial arts record from Sherdog

Kelvin Gastelum (born October 24, 1991) is an American professional mixed martial artist. He currently competes in the middleweight division of the Ultimate Fighting Championship (UFC). Gastelum earned a contract with the UFC after winning The Ultimate Fighter 17 in 2013. Gastelum has also competed in the welterweight division.

== Early life and education ==
Gastelum is of Mexican descent. His family is from Ciudad Obregón, Sonora, where he lived temporarily during his childhood. Gastelum won a 5A Division II AIA state wrestling title out of Cibola High School and continued to wrestle at North Idaho College, where he was ranked as high as fifth in the country (NJCAA) as a freshman before deciding to compete in mixed martial arts professionally. He worked as a bail bondsman prior to training MMA full-time.

== Mixed martial arts career ==
=== Early career ===
After turning professional, Gastelum amassed an undefeated record of five wins (all finishes) and no losses before competing in The Ultimate Fighter.

=== The Ultimate Fighter ===
In January 2013, it was announced that Gastelum was selected for The Ultimate Fighter: Team Jones vs. Team Sonnen. To get into the TUF house, Gastelum defeated Kito Andrews by decision. During the choosing of teams, he was picked last by coach Chael Sonnen for Team Sonnen.

Gastelum's next fight in the house was against Bubba McDaniel. He won in the second round via rear naked choke submission.

In the quarterfinals, Gastelum would take on Collin Hart. He won the fight by TKO in the first round.

In the semifinals, Gastelum fought Josh Samman. He won via first round rear naked choke, and advanced to the tournament finals.

=== Ultimate Fighting Championship ===
Gastelum faced teammate Uriah Hall in the finals at the Ultimate Fighter 17 Finale. Gastelum won the fight via split decision, becoming the youngest winner in the show's history at 21 years old and earned a UFC contract. After the victory, Gastelum announced he would be moving down a weight class to compete in the UFC's welterweight division.

==== Move to Welterweight ====
Gastelum was expected to face Paulo Thiago on August 28, 2013, at UFC Fight Night 27. However, Thiago pulled out of the bout citing a knee injury and was replaced by Brian Melancon. Gastelum finished Melancon via rear naked choke in the first round.

Gastelum was expected to face Court McGee on December 14, 2013, at UFC on Fox 9, but was forced to withdraw due to a torn PCL.

Gastelum faced Rick Story on March 15, 2014, at UFC 171. He won the back-and-forth fight via split decision.

Gastelum faced Nico Musoke on June 28, 2014, at UFC Fight Night 44. Gastelum missed weight by one and three-quarter pounds and forfeited 20% of his fight purse to Musoke. He won the fight via unanimous decision.

Gastelum next fought Jake Ellenberger on November 15, 2014, at UFC 180 as the co-main event. He won the fight in the first round via rear-naked choke. The win also earned Gastelum his first Performance of the Night bonus award.

Gastelum next faced Tyron Woodley on January 31, 2015, at UFC 183. He missed weight by 10 lbs and was fined 30% of his fight purse which would be given to Woodley. He lost the fight via split decision. In the post-fight interview with Joe Rogan, Woodley said that he would not accept 30% of Gastelum's purse, as him missing weight and losing was enough punishment.

Due to Gastelum not being able to make weight on two occasions while fighting in the welterweight division in the UFC, UFC president Dana White ordered Gastelum to move up to middleweight. In his return to middleweight, Gastelum faced Nate Marquardt at UFC 188 on June 13, 2015. He won the fight via TKO after Marquardt's corner stopped the fight between the second and third round.

Gastelum was expected to face Matt Brown in a welterweight bout on November 21, 2015, at The Ultimate Fighter Latin America 2 Finale. However, Brown withdrew from the fight due to an ankle injury suffered in training. He was replaced by Neil Magny. Gastelum lost the fight by split decision. Both participants earned Fight of the Night honors.

Gastelum was scheduled to face Kyle Noke on January 2, 2016 at UFC 195, however, Gastelum pulled out due to a wrist injury and was replaced by Alex Morono.

Gastelum next faced Johny Hendricks on July 9, 2016 at UFC 200. He won the fight via unanimous decision.

Gastelum was expected to face Donald Cerrone at UFC 205 but, on the day of the weigh-ins, Gastelum did not make an attempt to formally make the 171 lb limit and the bout was scrapped. This made it the third time Gastelum failed to make the welterweight limit, prompting Dana White to say that he will "never let him fight at 170 again".

==== Return to Middleweight ====
Gastelum returned to middleweight and faced Tim Kennedy on December 10, 2016 at UFC 206. He won the fight via TKO in the third round.

Gastelum next fought Vitor Belfort on March 11, 2017, in the main event at UFC Fight Night 106. He won the fight via TKO in the first round. The win also earned Gastelum a Performance of the Night bonus award.

Gastelum was expected to face Anderson Silva at UFC 212. However, he was pulled from the event after USADA learned he tested positive for high levels of marijuana metabolite Carboxy-Tetrahydrocannabinol (Carboxy-THC) above the 180 mL allowance by the World Anti-Doping Agency (WADA) from his previous drug test for his bout against Belfort. On May 7, Gastelum's win over Belfort was officially overturned to a "No Contest" and he was suspended 90 days (retroactive to the March 11 test date). The Performance of the Night which Gastelum had been awarded against Vitor Belfort was also rescinded.

Gastelum faced Chris Weidman on July 22, 2017, in the main event at UFC on Fox 25. Gastelum lost the fight via submission in the third round.

The bout with Anderson Silva was rescheduled and was expected to take place at a UFC Fight Night on November 25, 2017. However, Silva was pulled from the bout due to failing a USADA drug test and was replaced by Michael Bisping. Gastelum defeated Bisping by knockout in the first round. He also earned his second Performance of the Night bonus award.

Gastelum faced Ronaldo Souza on May 12, 2018, at UFC 224. He won the back and forth fight via split decision. Both combatants received the Fight of the Night bonus.

In July 2018, the UFC announced that Gastelum and Robert Whittaker were selected as coaches for Ultimate Fighter 28. On November 2, 2018, it was announced that Gastelum was scheduled to face Whittaker for the UFC Middleweight Championship on February 9, 2019, at UFC 234. However, Whittaker pulled out of the fight a few hours before the event and was forced to undergo emergency dual surgery later in the day due to an abdominal hernia of the intestine and a twisted and collapsed bowel.

Gastelum faced Israel Adesanya on April 13, 2019 at UFC 236 for the interim UFC Middleweight Championship. He lost the fight via unanimous decision in a back and forth fight. This fight earned him the Fight of the Night award, and was later voted the 2019 Fight of the Year by multiple MMA media outlets.

Gastelum faced Darren Till at UFC 244 in New York City, New York on November 2, 2019. Subsequent to the event's weigh-ins, the NYSAC issued a rare statement that they would be pursuing disciplinary action against Gastelum. Per the statement, the Athletic Commission stated upon review of Gastelum's weigh-in video that they "determined that Mr. Gastelum made contact with another person while on the scale, a violation of the weigh in policy. As the result, Gastelum and his coach, Rafael Cordeiro, were fined $1,000 and $200 respectively by New York State Athletic Commission. The official weight determination would not be disturbed, and Mr. Gastelum would not be disqualified from competing in UFC 244." He lost the fight via split decision. Gastelum was suspended by USADA for 9 months for testing positive for marijuana in relation to his bout with Darren Till at UFC 244 in November 2019 but the suspension was reduced to five months after Gastelum's successful completion of a drug treatment program.

Gastelum faced Jack Hermansson on July 19, 2020, at UFC Fight Night 172. He lost the fight via heel hook in round one.

Gastelum was scheduled to face Ian Heinisch on January 30, 2021, at UFC Fight Night 186. On December 26, 2020, it was announced that the bout had been moved to UFC 258 on February 13, 2021. Gastelum won the fight via unanimous decision.

Gastelum faced Robert Whittaker, replacing Paulo Costa, on April 17, 2021, at UFC on ESPN 22. Gastelum lost the fight via unanimous decision. This fight earned him the Fight of the Night award.

Gastelum faced Jared Cannonier on August 21, 2021, at UFC on ESPN 29. Gastelum lost the fight via unanimous decision.

Gastelum was scheduled to face Nassourdine Imavov on April 9, 2022, at UFC 273. However, Imavov was forced to withdraw due to visa issues and was replaced by Dricus du Plessis. However, Gastelum withdrew a week before the event due to an undisclosed injury and his bout with du Plessis was canceled. The fight was yet again rescheduled at UFC Fight Night 217 on January 14, 2023. However, the week of the event, Gastelum withdrew due to a mouth injury and was replaced by Sean Strickland in a light heavyweight bout.

Gastelum faced Chris Curtis on April 8, 2023, at UFC 287. He won the bout via unanimous decision. This fight earned him the Fight of the Night award.

==== Return to Welterweight ====
Gastelum was scheduled to face Shavkat Rakhmonov in a welterweight bout on September 16, 2023, at UFC Fight Night 227. However, Gastelum withdrew in late July after sustaining a facial fracture.

Gastelum faced Sean Brady on December 2, 2023, at UFC on ESPN 52. He lost the fight via a kimura submission in round three.

==== Back to Middleweight ====
Gastelum faced Daniel Rodriguez on June 22, 2024, at UFC on ABC 6. The bout was changed to a middleweight bout due to Gastelum having issues cutting weight. He won the fight by unanimous decision.

On the UFC 312 broadcast in February 2025, it was announced that Gastelum's bout with Israel Adesanya at UFC 236 in April 2019 will be inducted into the fight wing of the 2025 UFC Hall of Fame.

Gastelum was scheduled to face Joe Pyfer on March 29, 2025 at UFC on ESPN 64. However, despite both men weighing in for the bout, the match was cancelled the day of the event due to an illness sustained by Pyfer. The bout was rescheduled and took place on June 7, 2025 at UFC 316. After being knocked down twice, Gastelum lost the fight by unanimous decision.

Gastelum faced Dustin Stoltzfus on September 13, 2025 at UFC Fight Night 259. At the weigh-ins, Gastelum weighed in at 191 pounds, five pounds over the middleweight non-title fight limit. His bout is proceeded at catchweight and he was fined 35 percent of his purse which went to Stoltzfus. Gastelum won the fight by unanimous decision.

Replacing Kyle Daukaus, Gastelum faced Vicente Luque on April 11, 2026, at UFC 327. He lost the fight via a anaconda choke submission in the first round.

Gastelum was scheduled to face Yousri Belgaroui on September 12, 2026 at UFC Fight Night 288. However, Gastelum pulled out on August 13 and was replaced by Djorden Santos.

== Fighting style ==
Gastelum is known for his compact southpaw boxing style, blending quick hand speed with forward pressure and durability. Despite often being the shorter fighter in his weight class, he uses head movement and tight combinations to close the distance and force exchanges in the pocket. He often relies on counter left hands and looping hooks during exchanges, and his ability to absorb shots and fire back has made him a dangerous opponent in back-and-forth fights.

While primarily a striker, Gastelum has a strong wrestling background from his collegiate days and occasionally uses it to keep opponents guessing. However, he generally prefers to keep the fight standing, using sprawls and lateral movement rather than prolonged grappling sequences. His style has evolved over the years to emphasize explosiveness in short bursts, and he often thrives in chaotic exchanges where timing and toughness become deciding factors.

== Championships and accomplishments ==
- Ultimate Fighting Championship
  - UFC Hall of Fame (Fight Wing, Class of 2025) vs. Israel Adesanya at UFC 236
  - The Ultimate Fighter 17 Winner
  - Fight of the Night (Five times) vs. Neil Magny, Ronaldo Souza, Israel Adesanya, Robert Whittaker, and Chris Curtis
  - Performance of the Night (Three times) vs. Jake Ellenberger, Vitor Belfort and Michael Bisping
  - UFC Honors Awards
    - 2019: President's Choice Fight of the Year Winner vs. Israel Adesanya
  - UFC.com Awards
    - 2013: Ranked #3 Newcomer of the Year & Ranked #7 Upset of the Year vs. Uriah Hall
    - 2017: Ranked #10 Knockout of the Year vs. Michael Bisping
    - 2019: Fight of the Year vs. Israel Adesanya
- World MMA Awards
  - 2014 Breakthrough Fighter of the Year
- Wrestling Observer Newsletter
  - 2019 MMA Match of the Year vs. Israel Adesanya at UFC 236
- ESPN
  - 2019 Fight of the Year vs. Israel Adesanya at UFC 236
- MMA Junkie
  - 2019 April Fight of the Month vs. Israel Adesanya at UFC 236
  - 2019 Fight of the Year vs. Israel Adesanya at UFC 236
- MMA Fighting
  - 2019 Fight of the Year vs. Israel Adesanya at UFC 236
- Yahoo Sports
  - 2019 Fight of the Year vs. Israel Adesanya at UFC 236
- Cageside Press
  - 2019 Fight of the Year vs. Israel Adesanya at UFC 236
- Bleacher Report
  - 2019 Fight of the Year vs. Israel Adesanya at UFC 236
- Bloody Elbow
  - 2019 Fight of the Year vs. Israel Adesanya at UFC 236
- CBS Sports
  - 2019 UFC Fight of the Year vs. Israel Adesanya at UFC 236
- MMA Mania
  - 2019 Fight of the Year vs. Israel Adesanya at UFC 236
- MMA Sucka
  - 2019 Fight of the Year vs. Israel Adesanya at UFC 236
- LowKick MMA
  - 2019 Fight of the Year vs. Israel Adesanya at UFC 236

== Mixed martial arts record ==
Professional record breakdown
32 matches	20 wins	11 losses
By knockout	6	0
By submission	5	4
By decision	9	7
No contests	1	

Res.	Record	Opponent	Method	Event	Date	Round	Time	Location	Notes
Loss	20–11 (1)	Vicente Luque	Submission (anaconda choke)	UFC 327	April 11, 2026	1	4:08	Miami, Florida, United States	
Win	20–10 (1)	Dustin Stoltzfus	Decision (unanimous)	UFC Fight Night: Lopes vs. Silva	September 13, 2025	3	5:00	San Antonio, Texas, United States	Catchweight (191 lb) bout; Gastelum missed weight.
Loss	19–10 (1)	Joe Pyfer	Decision (unanimous)	UFC 316	June 7, 2025	3	5:00	Newark, New Jersey, United States	
Win	19–9 (1)	Daniel Rodriguez	Decision (unanimous)	UFC on ABC: Whittaker vs. Aliskerov	June 22, 2024	3	5:00	Riyadh, Saudi Arabia	Return to Middleweight.
Loss	18–9 (1)	Sean Brady	Submission (kimura)	UFC on ESPN: Dariush vs. Tsarukyan	December 2, 2023	3	1:43	Austin, Texas, United States	Welterweight bout.
Win	18–8 (1)	Chris Curtis	Decision (unanimous)	UFC 287	April 8, 2023	3	5:00	Miami, Florida, United States	Fight of the Night.
Loss	17–8 (1)	Jared Cannonier	Decision (unanimous)	UFC on ESPN: Cannonier vs. Gastelum	August 21, 2021	5	5:00	Las Vegas, Nevada, United States	
Loss	17–7 (1)	Robert Whittaker	Decision (unanimous)	UFC on ESPN: Whittaker vs. Gastelum	April 17, 2021	5	5:00	Las Vegas, Nevada, United States	Fight of the Night.
Win	17–6 (1)	Ian Heinisch	Decision (unanimous)	UFC 258	February 13, 2021	3	5:00	Las Vegas, Nevada, United States	
Loss	16–6 (1)	Jack Hermansson	Submission (heel hook)	UFC Fight Night: Figueiredo vs. Benavidez 2	July 19, 2020	1	1:18	Abu Dhabi, United Arab Emirates	
Loss	16–5 (1)	Darren Till	Decision (split)	UFC 244	November 2, 2019	3	5:00	New York City, New York, United States	
Loss	16–4 (1)	Israel Adesanya	Decision (unanimous)	UFC 236	April 13, 2019	5	5:00	Atlanta, Georgia, United States	For the interim UFC Middleweight Championship. Fight of the Night.
Win	16–3 (1)	Ronaldo Souza	Decision (split)	UFC 224	May 12, 2018	3	5:00	Rio de Janeiro, Brazil	Fight of the Night.
Win	15–3 (1)	Michael Bisping	KO (punch)	UFC Fight Night: Bisping vs. Gastelum	November 25, 2017	1	2:30	Shanghai, China	Performance of the Night.
Loss	14–3 (1)	Chris Weidman	Submission (arm-triangle choke)	UFC on Fox: Weidman vs. Gastelum	July 22, 2017	3	3:45	Uniondale, New York, United States	
NC	14–2 (1)	Vitor Belfort	NC (overturned)	UFC Fight Night: Belfort vs. Gastelum	March 11, 2017	1	3:52	Fortaleza, Brazil	Originally a TKO (punches) win for Gastelum; overturned after he tested positive for a marijuana metabolite.
Win	14–2	Tim Kennedy	TKO (punches)	UFC 206	December 10, 2016	3	2:45	Toronto, Ontario, Canada	Return to Middleweight.
Win	13–2	Johny Hendricks	Decision (unanimous)	UFC 200	July 9, 2016	3	5:00	Las Vegas, Nevada, United States	Catchweight (171.25 lb) bout; Hendricks missed weight.
Loss	12–2	Neil Magny	Decision (split)	The Ultimate Fighter Latin America 2 Finale: Magny vs. Gastelum	November 21, 2015	5	5:00	Monterrey, Mexico	Fight of the Night.
Win	12–1	Nate Marquardt	TKO (corner stoppage)	UFC 188	June 13, 2015	2	5:00	Mexico City, Mexico	Middleweight bout.
Loss	11–1	Tyron Woodley	Decision (split)	UFC 183	January 31, 2015	3	5:00	Las Vegas, Nevada, United States	Catchweight (180 lb) bout; Gastelum missed weight.
Win	11–0	Jake Ellenberger	Submission (rear-naked choke)	UFC 180	November 15, 2014	1	4:46	Mexico City, Mexico	Performance of the Night.
Win	10–0	Nico Musoke	Decision (unanimous)	UFC Fight Night: Swanson vs. Stephens	June 28, 2014	3	5:00	San Antonio, Texas, United States	Catchweight (172.75 lb) bout; Gastelum missed weight.
Win	9–0	Rick Story	Decision (split)	UFC 171	March 15, 2014	3	5:00	Dallas, Texas, United States	
Win	8–0	Brian Melancon	Submission (rear-naked choke)	UFC Fight Night: Condit vs. Kampmann 2	August 28, 2013	1	2:26	Indianapolis, Indiana, United States	Welterweight debut.
Win	7–0	Uriah Hall	Decision (split)	The Ultimate Fighter: Team Jones vs. Team Sonnen Finale	April 13, 2013	3	5:00	Las Vegas, Nevada, United States	Won The Ultimate Fighter 17 Middleweight Tournament.
Win	6–0	Mike Ashford	TKO (punches)	Rage in the Cage 161	July 20, 2012	1	1:57	Chandler, Arizona, United States	
Win	5–0	Bill Smallwood	Submission (rear-naked choke)	RUF MMA: Cage Rage on the River 2	July 7, 2012	1	0:56	Parker, Arizona, United States	
Win	4–0	Mike Gentile	TKO (punches)	Desert Rage Full Contact Fighting 10	October 22, 2011	2	2:32	Yuma, Arizona, United States	
Win	3–0	Yair Moguel	Submission (kimura)	Latin American Warriors 1: Heatwave	July 16, 2011	3	2:26	Mexicali, Mexico	
Win	2–0	Jose Sanchez	TKO (submission to punches)	Latin American Fighter 1: Border Wars	December 11, 2010	2	1:38	Mexicali, Mexico	
Win	1–0	Luis Magana	Submission (armbar)	Warrior CF 1	March 28, 2009	1	N/A	Mexicali, Mexico	Middleweight debut.

== Mixed martial arts exhibition record ==
Exhibition record breakdown		
4 matches	4 wins	0 losses
By knockout	1	0
By submission	2	0
By decision	1	0

Res.	Record	Opponent	Method	Event	Date	Round	Time	Location	Notes
Win	4–0	Josh Samman	Submission (rear-naked choke)	The Ultimate Fighter: Team Jones vs. Team Sonnen	April 9, 2013 (air date)	1	4:03	Las Vegas, Nevada, United States	The Ultimate Fighter 17 semi-final.
Win	3–0	Collin Hart	TKO (punches)	The Ultimate Fighter: Team Jones vs. Team Sonnen	March 26, 2013 (air date)	1	0:33	Las Vegas, Nevada, United States	The Ultimate Fighter 17 quarter-final.
Win	2–0	Bubba McDaniel	Submission (rear-naked choke)	The Ultimate Fighter: Team Jones vs. Team Sonnen	February 17, 2013 (air date)	2	2:39	Las Vegas, Nevada, United States	The Ultimate Fighter 17 elimination round.
Win	1–0	Kito Andrews	Decision (unanimous)	The Ultimate Fighter: Team Jones vs. Team Sonnen	January 22, 2013 (air date)	2	5:00	Las Vegas, Nevada, United States	The Ultimate Fighter 17 preliminary round.

== See also ==
- List of current UFC fighters
- List of male mixed martial artists
