= Thiago Santos =

Brazilian mixed martial artist (born 1984)

- Born: Thiago de Lima Santos; January 7, 1984 (age 42); Rio de Janeiro, Brazil
- Nickname: Marreta
- Height: 6 ft 2 in (1.88 m)
- Weight: 205 lb (93 kg; 14.6 st)
- Division: Heavyweight (2024); Light heavyweight (2018–present); Middleweight (2013–2018); Welterweight (2010–2012)
- Reach: 76 in (193 cm)
- Fighting out of: Rio de Janeiro, Brazil
- Team: American Top Team; TATA Fight Team
- Rank: Green rope in Capoeira; Black belt in Muay Thai; Black belt in Brazilian Jiu-Jitsu
- Years active: 2010–present (MMA)

Mixed martial arts record
- Total: 38
- Wins: 23
- By knockout: 16
- By submission: 1
- By decision: 6
- Losses: 14
- By knockout: 5
- By submission: 3
- By decision: 6
- No contests: 1

Other information
- Mixed martial arts record from Sherdog

Thiago de Lima Santos (born January 7, 1984) is a Brazilian professional mixed martial artist. He currently competes in the Light Heavyweight division. Santos competed in the Professional Fighters League (PFL) and in the Ultimate Fighting Championship (UFC) in the Light Heavyweight and Middleweight divisions, and he challenged for the UFC Light Heavyweight Championship once in July 2019. A professional competitor since 2010, he gained entrance into the UFC by competing on The Ultimate Fighter: Brazil 2.

== Background ==
Santos was born into a poverty-stricken family in Rio de Janeiro. In early childhood, he suffered from an undiagnosed disease that spawned growing cysts in his stomach, but which were surgically removed. In one of the occasional floods in his city, Santos' family lost their belongings and after a period of homelessness, they settled in the notorious neighborhood of Cidade de Deus. Santos' father died just days after his mixed martial arts debut in 2010.

== Mixed martial arts career ==
=== Early career ===
Before starting MMA, Santos trained in capoeira for eight years and was a Brazilian army paratrooper.

He made his professional MMA debut in October 2010. Before joining The Ultimate Fighter, he had a record of 8 wins and only 1 loss.

=== The Ultimate Fighter: Brazil ===
In March 2013, it was announced that Santos was part of the cast of The Ultimate Fighter: Brazil 2.

In the opening round, Santos defeated Gil Freitas by majority decision to get into the TUF house. He was the last pick when it came to the coaches' pick, ending up on Team Werdum. In the elimination round, Santos first faced Pedro Iriê and won by unanimous decision. In the quarterfinals, he faced eventual season winner Leonardo Santos and lost via unanimous decision.

=== Ultimate Fighting Championship ===
Despite not winning the show, Santos was signed to a contract by the UFC. He made his debut on August 3, 2013, at UFC 163 against The Ultimate Fighter: Brazil winner Cezar Ferreira. He lost the fight via submission in the first round.

For his second fight with the promotion, Santos faced Ronny Markes on March 23, 2014, at UFC Fight Night: Shogun vs. Henderson 2. He won the fight via TKO in the first round.

Santos faced Uriah Hall at UFC 175. He lost the fight via unanimous decision.

Santos next faced Andy Enz on January 30, 2015, at UFC 183. He won the fight via TKO in the first round.

Santos faced promotional newcomer Steve Bossé on June 27, 2015, at UFC Fight Night 70. He won the fight by knockout in the first round and earned a Performance of the Night bonus.

Santos faced Elias Theodorou on December 10, 2015, at UFC Fight Night 80. He won the fight by unanimous decision (29–28, 29–27, and 29–27).

Santos faced Nate Marquardt on May 14, 2016, at UFC 198. He won the fight via knockout in the first round.

Santos fought Gegard Mousasi on July 9, 2016, at UFC 200, filling in for an injured Derek Brunson. He lost the fight via knockout in the first round.

Santos fought Eric Spicely on September 24, 2016, at UFC Fight Night 95. In a large upset, he lost the fight by submission in the first round.

Santos faced Jack Marshman on February 19, 2017, at UFC Fight Night 105. He won the fight via TKO in the second round due to a combination of a spinning heel kick and punches and picked up a Performance of the Night bonus award.

Santos faced Gerald Meerschaert on July 8, 2017, at UFC 213. He won the fight via TKO in the second round.

Santos was briefly linked to a bout with promotional newcomer Michał Materla on October 21, 2017, at UFC Fight Night 118. However, it was revealed on 1 September that Materla had reneged on his agreement with the UFC and was re-signing with the Polish regional promotion KSW. In turn, Santos was removed from the card and faced Jack Hermansson a week later at UFC Fight Night 119. He won the fight via technical knock out in round one.

Santos faced Anthony Smith on February 3, 2018, at UFC Fight Night 125. He won the fight via technical knockout in round two. This win earned him the Fight of the Night bonus.

Santos faced David Branch on April 21, 2018, at UFC Fight Night 128. He lost the fight via knockout in round one.

Santos faced promotional newcomer Kevin Holland on August 4, 2018, at UFC 227. He won the fight by unanimous decision (29–27, 29–27, and 29–26).

==== Move to Light Heavyweight ====
Santos was scheduled to face Jimi Manuwa in a light heavyweight bout on September 22, 2018, at UFC Fight Night 137, replacing injured Glover Teixeira. Manuwa would also pull out of the bout on September 16, 2018, due to a torn hamstring and he was replaced by Eryk Anders. Santos defeated Anders via referee stoppage TKO when Anders failed to make it to his corner at the conclusion of round three. This win earned him the Fight of the Night award.

Santos faced Jimi Manuwa on December 8, 2018, at UFC 231. He won by KO early in the 2nd round. This win earned him the Performance of the Night award and tied for most bout in a calendar year with 5.

Santos faced Jan Błachowicz on February 23, 2019, at UFC Fight Night 145. He won the fight by TKO in the third round. This win earned him the Performance of the Night award.

After going undefeated at 3–0 in Light Heavyweight bouts, Santos challenged Jon Jones for the UFC Light Heavyweight Championship in the main event at UFC 239 on July 6, 2019. He lost the back-and-forth fight via split decision. Despite the loss, Santos was the first and only fighter in MMA history to win a judge's scorecard against Jones. During the fight, he sustained a torn left ACL, PCL, MCL, meniscus, and cracked tibia along with a partially torn right meniscus.

Santos was scheduled to Glover Teixeira on September 12, 2020, at UFC Fight Night 177. However, due to Teixeira tested positive for COVID-19 a week prior to the bout, the pair was rescheduled to fight on October 4, 2020 at UFC on ESPN: Holm vs. Aldana. In turn, on September 15, the bout was postponed again as Santos himself tested positive for the virus. The pairing with Teixeira eventually took place on November 7, 2020, at UFC on ESPN: Santos vs. Teixeira. Despite nearly finishing Teixeira on a couple occasions. Santos lost the fight via submission in round three.

Santos faced Aleksandar Rakić on March 6, 2021, at UFC 259. He lost the fight via unanimous decision.

Santos faced Johnny Walker on October 2, 2021, at UFC Fight Night 193. He won the fight via unanimous decision.

Santos faced Magomed Ankalaev on March 12, 2022, at UFC Fight Night 203. He lost the bout via unanimous decision.

Santos faced Jamahal Hill on August 6, 2022, at UFC on ESPN 40. He lost the fight via technical knockout. This fight earned him the Fight of the Night award.

=== Professional Fighters League ===
After fighting out his UFC contract, it was announced on September 8, 2022, that Santos had signed a multi-fight deal with the Professional Fighters League, and that he would be a participant in their 2023 season as a light heavyweight.

Santos started off the 2023 season against Rob Wilkinson on April 1, 2023, at PFL 1. He lost the bout via unanimous decision. The result of the bout was later overturned to a no contest after Wilkinson tested positive for Elevated t/e ratio resulting from the androgynous origin of testosterone.

Santos was scheduled to face Mohammad Fakhreddine on June 8, 2023, at PFL 4. On May 9, 2023, it was announced that Santos had failed a commission drug test and was pulled from the season. Santos was later suspended 6 months and fined for testing positive for Clomifene.

Santos faced Yoel Romero on February 24, 2024, at PFL vs. Bellator. He lost the bout by unanimous decision.

Santos stepped in on short notice to replace Sergei Bilostenniy against Denis Goltsov at PFL 4 on June 13, 2024. He lost the bout via TKO in the first round.

==== Global Fight League ====
On December 11, 2024, it was announced that Santos was signed by Global Fight League.

Santos was scheduled to face Devin Clark on May 25, 2025, at GFL 2. However, all GFL events were cancelled indefinitely.

== Personal life ==
Santos has a son from a previous relationship.

Santos runs a non-profit organization that offers free mixed martial arts training for children coming from poor families.

Santos is married to UFC women's bantamweight Yana Kunitskaya. The pair got engaged in December 2020 and in August 2021 Kunitskaya announced they were expecting their first child together.

== Championships and accomplishments ==
- Ultimate Fighting Championship
  - Performance of the Night (Four times) vs. Jack Marshman, Steve Bossé, Jimi Manuwa, and Jan Błachowicz
  - Fight of the Night (Three times) vs. Anthony Smith, Eryk Anders and Jamahal Hill
  - Tied for most UFC bouts in a calendar year (5).
  - Tied (Anderson Silva & Uriah Hall) for most knockout victories in UFC Middleweight division history (8)
    - Tied (Anthony Johnson & Anderson Silva, Dustin Poirier & Drew Dober) for fourth most knockouts in modern UFC history (11)
  - Fifth most knockdowns in UFC Middleweight division history (9)
    - Tied (Chuck Liddell, Lyoto Machida, Junior dos Santos, Maurício Rua & Khalil Rountree Jr.) for sixth most knockdowns landed in UFC history (14)
  - UFC.com Awards
    - 2014: Ranked #9 Upset of the Year vs. Ronny Markes
    - 2015: Ranked #3 Knockout of the Year vs. Steve Bossé
    - 2018: Ranked #10 Fighter of the Year (Tied with Corey Anderson & Kamaru Usman) & Ranked #7 Fight of the Year vs. Jimi Manuwa
- MMA Torch
  - 2015 Best Knockout of the Half-Year vs. Steve Bossé
- MMA Junkie
  - 2018 Round of the Year (Round 1) vs. Jimi Manuwa
  - 2018 December Fight of the Month vs. Jimi Manuwa
  - 2018 Under-the-Radar Fighter of the Year

== Mixed martial arts record ==
Professional record breakdown
38 matches	23 wins	14 losses
By knockout	16	5
By submission	1	3
By decision	6	6
No contests	1	

Res.	Record	Opponent	Method	Event	Date	Round	Time	Location	Notes
Loss	23–14 (1)	Tafon Nchukwi	Decision (split)	RCC Hard 21 x Gamebred FC	September 12, 2026	3	5:00	Chelyabinsk, Russia	Gamebred FC Heavyweight Grand Prix Quarterfinal.
Win	23–13 (1)	Guto Inocente	TKO (punches)	Gamebred Bareknuckle MMA 9	April 10, 2026	1	4:20	Santo Domingo, Dominican Republic	Gamebred FC Heavyweight Grand Prix Round of 16.
Loss	22–13 (1)	Denis Goltsov	TKO (punches)	PFL 4 (2024)	June 13, 2024	1	2:22	Uncasville, Connecticut, United States	Heavyweight debut.
Loss	22–12 (1)	Yoel Romero	Decision (unanimous)	PFL vs. Bellator	February 24, 2024	3	5:00	Riyadh, Saudi Arabia	
NC	22–11 (1)	Rob Wilkinson	NC (overturned)	PFL 1 (2023)	April 1, 2023	3	5:00	Las Vegas, Nevada, United States	Originally a Decision (unanimous) win for Wilkinson; overturned after he tested positive for Elevated t/e ratio.
Loss	22–11	Jamahal Hill	TKO (punches and elbows)	UFC on ESPN: Santos vs. Hill	August 6, 2022	4	2:31	Las Vegas, Nevada, United States	Fight of the Night.
Loss	22–10	Magomed Ankalaev	Decision (unanimous)	UFC Fight Night: Santos vs. Ankalaev	March 12, 2022	5	5:00	Las Vegas, Nevada, United States	
Win	22–9	Johnny Walker	Decision (unanimous)	UFC Fight Night: Santos vs. Walker	October 2, 2021	5	5:00	Las Vegas, Nevada, United States	
Loss	21–9	Aleksandar Rakić	Decision (unanimous)	UFC 259	March 6, 2021	3	5:00	Las Vegas, Nevada, United States	
Loss	21–8	Glover Teixeira	Submission (rear-naked choke)	UFC on ESPN: Santos vs. Teixeira	November 7, 2020	3	1:49	Las Vegas, Nevada, United States	
Loss	21–7	Jon Jones	Decision (split)	UFC 239	July 6, 2019	5	5:00	Las Vegas, Nevada, United States	For the UFC Light Heavyweight Championship.
Win	21–6	Jan Błachowicz	TKO (punches)	UFC Fight Night: Błachowicz vs. Santos	February 23, 2019	3	0:39	Prague, Czech Republic	Performance of the Night.
Win	20–6	Jimi Manuwa	KO (punches)	UFC 231	December 8, 2018	2	0:41	Toronto, Ontario, Canada	Performance of the Night.
Win	19–6	Eryk Anders	TKO (elbows)	UFC Fight Night: Santos vs. Anders	September 22, 2018	3	5:00	São Paulo, Brazil	Light Heavyweight debut. Fight of the Night.
Win	18–6	Kevin Holland	Decision (unanimous)	UFC 227	August 4, 2018	3	5:00	Los Angeles, California, United States	
Loss	17–6	David Branch	KO (punches)	UFC Fight Night: Barboza vs. Lee	April 21, 2018	1	2:30	Atlantic City, New Jersey, United States	
Win	17–5	Anthony Smith	TKO (kick to the body and punches)	UFC Fight Night: Machida vs. Anders	February 3, 2018	2	1:03	Belém, Brazil	Fight of the Night.
Win	16–5	Jack Hermansson	TKO (punches)	UFC Fight Night: Brunson vs. Machida	October 28, 2017	1	4:59	São Paulo, Brazil	
Win	15–5	Gerald Meerschaert	TKO (punches)	UFC 213	July 8, 2017	2	2:04	Las Vegas, Nevada, United States	
Win	14–5	Jack Marshman	TKO (spinning wheel kick and punches)	UFC Fight Night: Lewis vs. Browne	February 19, 2017	2	2:21	Halifax, Nova Scotia, Canada	Performance of the Night.
Loss	13–5	Eric Spicely	Submission (rear-naked choke)	UFC Fight Night: Cyborg vs. Länsberg	September 24, 2016	1	2:58	Brasília, Brazil	
Loss	13–4	Gegard Mousasi	KO (punches)	UFC 200	July 9, 2016	1	4:32	Las Vegas, Nevada, United States	
Win	13–3	Nate Marquardt	KO (punch)	UFC 198	May 14, 2016	1	3:39	Curitiba, Brazil	
Win	12–3	Elias Theodorou	Decision (unanimous)	UFC Fight Night: Namajunas vs. VanZant	December 10, 2015	3	5:00	Las Vegas, Nevada, United States	
Win	11–3	Steve Bossé	KO (head kick)	UFC Fight Night: Machida vs. Romero	June 27, 2015	1	0:29	Hollywood, Florida, United States	Performance of the Night.
Win	10–3	Andy Enz	TKO (punches)	UFC 183	January 31, 2015	1	1:56	Las Vegas, Nevada, United States	
Loss	9–3	Uriah Hall	Decision (unanimous)	UFC 175	July 5, 2014	3	5:00	Las Vegas, Nevada, United States	
Win	9–2	Ronny Markes	TKO (body kick and punches)	UFC Fight Night: Shogun vs. Henderson 2	March 23, 2014	1	0:53	Natal, Brazil	
Loss	8–2	Cezar Ferreira	Submission (guillotine choke)	UFC 163	August 3, 2013	1	0:47	Rio de Janeiro, Brazil	
Win	8–1	Denis Figueira	TKO (head kick and punches)	Watch Out Combat Show 20	July 27, 2012	1	4:15	Rio de Janeiro, Brazil	
Loss	7–1	Vicente Luque	TKO (punches)	Spartan MMA 2012	April 28, 2012	1	4:50	São Luís, Brazil	
Win	7–0	Junior Vidal	TKO (punches)	Watch Out Combat Show 18	March 3, 2012	1	N/A	Rio de Janeiro, Brazil	
Win	6–0	Eneas Souza	Submission (rear-naked choke)	Watch Out Combat Show 17	December 27, 2011	3	2:50	Rio de Janeiro, Brazil	
Win	5–0	Marcos Viggiani	Decision (unanimous)	Spartan MMA 2011	November 26, 2011	3	5:00	Rio de Janeiro, Brazil	
Win	4–0	Rafael Braga	TKO (punches)	Explosion Fight	August 13, 2011	1	N/A	Rio de Janeiro, Brazil	
Win	3–0	Mauricio Chueke	Decision (unanimous)	Watch Out Combat Show 14	July 23, 2011	3	5:00	Rio de Janeiro, Brazil	
Win	2–0	Gabriel Barreiro	TKO (punches)	Senna Fight	April 16, 2011	2	1:53	Rio de Janeiro, Brazil	
Win	1–0	Guilherme Benedito	Decision (unanimous)	Watch Out Combat Show 10	October 10, 2010	3	5:00	Rio de Janeiro, Brazil	

Exhibition record breakdown		
4 matches	2 wins	2 losses
By decision	2	2

Res.	Record	Opponent	Method	Event	Date	Round	Time	Location	Notes
Loss	2–2	Leonardo Santos	Decision (unanimous)	The Ultimate Fighter: Brazil 2	N/A (airdate)	2	5:00	São Paulo, Brazil	Quarter-finals bout.
Win	2–1	Pedro Iriê	Decision (unanimous)	The Ultimate Fighter: Brazil 2	N/A (airdate)	2	5:00	São Paulo, Brazil	Wild card bout.
Loss	1–1	William Macário	Decision (unanimous)	The Ultimate Fighter: Brazil 2	N/A (airdate)	2	5:00	São Paulo, Brazil	Preliminary bout.
Win	1–0	Gil Freitas	Decision (majority)	The Ultimate Fighter: Brazil 2	March 17, 2013 (airdate)	2	5:00	São Paulo, Brazil	TUF: Brazil 2 house entry bout.

== Pay-per-view bouts ==
No.	Event	Fight	Date	Venue	City	PPV Buys
1.	UFC 239	Jones vs. Santos	July 6, 2019	T-Mobile Arena	Paradise, Nevada, United States	Not Disclosed

== See also ==
- List of male mixed martial artists
