= UFC 169 =

UFC mixed martial arts event in 2014

UFC 169: Barão vs. Faber 2
- The poster for UFC 169: Barão vs. Faber 2
- Promotion: Ultimate Fighting Championship
- Date: February 1, 2014
- Venue: Prudential Center
- City: Newark, New Jersey
- Attendance: 14,308
- Total gate: $1.651 million
- Buyrate: 230,000

Event chronology
UFC on Fox: Henderson vs. Thomson	UFC 169: Barão vs. Faber 2	UFC Fight Night: Machida vs. Mousasi

UFC 169: Barão vs. Faber 2 was a mixed martial arts event held on February 1, 2014, at the Prudential Center in Newark, New Jersey.

The event was released on DVD on May 6, 2014. The DVD was distributed by the label Anchor Bay Entertainment.

== Background ==
A Light Heavyweight Championship bout between the current champion Jon Jones and #1 contender Glover Teixeira was briefly linked as the event headliner. However, just days after the announcement, Dana White indicated that "the timing didn't work out" for the pairing and that fight would take place at a later event.

The event was expected to be headlined by the long awaited return of the Bantamweight Champion Dominick Cruz. However, on January 6, UFC President Dana White announced that Cruz had torn his groin in training and pulled from the fight. Cruz had also vacated his title, making Renan Barão the undisputed bantamweight champion. Stepping up to replace Cruz was Urijah Faber, in a rematch of their interim title bout at UFC 149.

Co-featured on the card was UFC Featherweight Champion José Aldo, who defended his title against top contender Ricardo Lamas.

A heavyweight bout between Frank Mir and Alistair Overeem, scheduled to take place at UFC 167, was moved to this event.

Bobby Green was expected to face Abel Trujillo at this event. However, Green pulled out of the fight for undisclosed reasons and was replaced by former WEC lightweight champion Jamie Varner.

Chris Cariaso was expected to face Kyoji Horiguchi at the event. However, Horiguchi pulled out of the bout citing injury. He was replaced by WEC veteran Danny Martinez.

== Results ==
Main card
Weight class				Method	Round	Time	Notes
Bantamweight	Renan Barão (c)	def.	Urijah Faber	TKO (punches)	1	3:42	(Note: For the UFC Bantamweight Championship.)
Featherweight	José Aldo (c)	def.	Ricardo Lamas	Decision (unanimous) (49–46, 49–46, 49–46)	5	5:00	(Note: For the UFC Featherweight Championship.)
Heavyweight	Alistair Overeem	def.	Frank Mir	Decision (unanimous) (30–27, 30–27, 30–27)	3	5:00
Flyweight	Ali Bagautinov	def.	John Lineker	Decision (unanimous) (29–28, 29–28, 29–28)	3	5:00
Lightweight	Abel Trujillo	def.	Jamie Varner	KO (punch)	2	2:32
Preliminary card (Fox Sports 1)
Lightweight	Alan Patrick	def.	John Makdessi	Decision (unanimous) (29–28, 29–28, 30–27)	3	5:00
Flyweight	Chris Cariaso	def.	Danny Martinez	Decision (unanimous) (29–28, 29–28, 29–28)	3	5:00
Middleweight	Nick Catone	def.	Tom Watson	Decision (split) (28–29, 29–28, 30–27)	3	5:00
Lightweight	Al Iaquinta	def.	Kevin Lee	Decision (unanimous) (29–28, 29–28, 28–27)	3	5:00
Preliminary card (UFC Fight Pass)
Middleweight	Clint Hester	def.	Andy Enz	Decision (unanimous) (30–27, 30–27, 30–26)	3	5:00
Lightweight	Rashid Magomedov	def.	Anthony Rocco Martin	Decision (unanimous) (29–28, 29–28, 29–28)	3	5:00
Welterweight	Neil Magny	def.	Gasan Umalatov	Decision (unanimous) (29–28, 30–27, 30–27)	3	5:00

== Bonus awards ==
The following fighters received bonuses:

- Fight of The Night: Jamie Varner vs. Abel Trujillo ($75,000 each)
- Knockout of The Night: Abel Trujillo ($50,000)
- Submission of the Night: None awarded as no matches ended by submission

== Records set ==
This event, along with UFC Fight Night: Machida vs. Mousasi, UFC Fight Night: Silva vs. Bisping, UFC Fight Night: Werdum vs. Tybura, UFC Fight Night: Shogun vs. Smith and later UFC on ESPN: dos Anjos vs. Edwards, UFC Fight Night: Vieira vs. Tate and UFC on ABC: Hill vs. Rountree Jr. is currently tied for the second most decisions in a UFC event at 10, previously beating UFC 161. UFC 263 currently holds the record for most decisions in a UFC event at 11.

This event broke the record for the longest fight time with 2:51:14, later broken also by UFC 263 with 3:19:32.

== See also ==
- List of UFC events
- 2014 in UFC
