= Uriah Hall =

Jamaican-American mixed martial artist (born 1984)

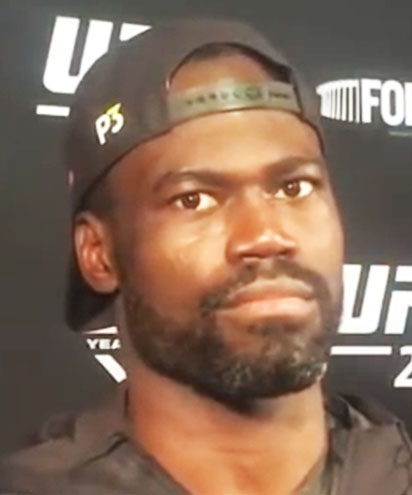
- Hall in 2018
- Born: Uriah Alexander Hall; July 31, 1984 (age 42); Spanish Town, Jamaica
- Other names: Primetime
- Nationality: Jamaican; American
- Height: 6 ft 0 in (183 cm)
- Weight: 185 lb (84 kg; 13 st 3 lb)
- Division: Light Heavyweight (2005); Middleweight (2009–2022)
- Reach: 80 in (203 cm)
- Fighting out of: Queens, New York City, U.S.
- Team: Xtreme Couture (formerly); Kings MMA (2018–2019); Fortis MMA (2019–2022)
- Rank: 2nd degree black belt in Kyokushin Karate under Tiger Schulmann's Mixed Martial Arts; Blue belt in Brazilian Jiu-Jitsu under Jason Manly
- Years active: 2005–2022

Professional boxing record
- Total: 2
- Wins: 1
- Losses: 1

Kickboxing record
- Total: 10
- Wins: 10
- Losses: 0

Mixed martial arts record
- Total: 28
- Wins: 17
- By knockout: 13
- By submission: 1
- By decision: 3
- Losses: 11
- By knockout: 4
- By decision: 7

Other information
- Boxing record from BoxRec
- Mixed martial arts record from Sherdog

Uriah Alexander Hall (born July 31, 1984) is a Jamaican-American former professional mixed martial artist, kickboxer, and current boxer. He competed in the Middleweight division in the Ultimate Fighting Championship (UFC). Hall was second on The Ultimate Fighter: Team Jones vs. Team Sonnen. Prior to his appearance on TUF, Hall competed in Bellator MMA and Ring of Combat, where he saw success in winning the ROC Championship. He is also the first UFC fighter in history to win a fight without throwing a single strike. Hall has notable wins against former UFC middleweight champions Anderson Silva and Chris Weidman, as well as a win against former Bellator middleweight champion Gegard Mousasi.

== Early life ==
Uriah Hall was born in Spanish Town, Jamaica but moved to the New York City borough of Queens in the United States at the age of 13. Upon his arrival in the US, he was bullied at school but found refuge in martial arts at the age of 16. He is a second degree blackbelt in Tiger Schulmann's Mixed Martial Arts under Tiger Schulmann and also competed as a kickboxer in the World Combat League.

== Mixed martial arts career ==
=== Early career ===
Hall started his career 3–0, including a TKO victory over Edwin Aguilar at Bellator 11, before fighting for the vacant Ring of Combat Middleweight title. Hall missed weight by 0.25 lbs and paid $100 penalty to his opponent. Despite missing weight, the fight remained a title fight. Hall won by first-round submission.

In September 2010, Hall suffered his first professional loss as he was defeated by future UFC champion Chris Weidman by TKO.

Hall suffered his second loss to Costas Philippou at Ring of Combat 34 by majority decision.

Hall would get back to his winning ways, collecting 3 consecutive victories over Aung La Nsang, Daniel Akinyemi and Nodar Kudukhashvili. He won the vacant Ring of Combat Middleweight Championship against Kudukhashvili.

=== The Ultimate Fighter ===
On January 9, 2013, it was announced that Hall had been selected as a fighter for the seventeenth season of The Ultimate Fighter with coaches Jon Jones and Chael Sonnen.

In the opening round to get into the house, Hall took on Andy Enz and won via decision. Hall was the number two fighter selection for Team Sonnen.

In episode 3 Hall faced Adam Cella from Team Jones. With just ten seconds left in the first round, Hall unleashed a devastating spinning hook kick to Cella's head that knocked him unconscious. The knockout was declared the most vicious knockout seen by Dana White over The Ultimate Fighter's eight-year history.

With the win, Hall advanced on to the quarter-finals and took on Bubba McDaniel of Team Jones. Hall knocked McDaniel out with a right straight counter-punch just as he was advancing forwards in the first round. That one punch broke McDaniel's face in three places. This led to Dana White stating that Hall was the "most dangerous" fighter in TUF history and coach Sonnen to say he will be a contender in the middleweight division.

Hall faced Dylan Andrews in the semi-finals. He displayed a more technical approach, utilizing a jab through a majority of the first round. Taken down in the second round by Andrews, Hall attempted a kimura submission before throwing strikes from the bottom position that severely hurt Andrews and forced him to lose his top control and caused Hall to land massive ground & pound to secure the TKO victory for Hall.

=== Ultimate Fighting Championship ===
With his successful 4–0 run on the show, Uriah garnered a lot of attention from the public. Hall then faced fellow Team Sonnen fighter Kelvin Gastelum in the finals at The Ultimate Fighter 17 Finale. Kelvin Gastelum, in an impressive upset, won the fight via split decision. Although Hall appeared in good spirits after the loss, the fight was not without controversy. While Gastelum had visible control of the fight in all three rounds, Hall fans have used FIGHTMETRIC scores to highlight the statistical dominance held by Hall in the second and third rounds. When asked about his performance in the post-fight conference, Hall stated that his emotional side, stemming from liking and training with Kelvin had gotten the best of him. He went on to say "Kelvin is a great guy, he's a tough kid you know, I think he's going to go really far in this sport and I'm happy for him."

Hall was expected to fight Nick Ring on August 17, 2013, at UFC Fight Night 26. However, Ring was pulled from the bout and replaced by Hall's fellow The Ultimate Fighter 17 alumni Josh Samman. However, on July 17, it was announced that Samman was out of the bout and that Hall would face returning UFC fighter John Howard. He lost the fight via split decision.

Hall faced Chris Leben on December 28, 2013, at UFC 168. Leading up to the fight UFC President Dana White said that it was a must-win for Hall if he wanted to keep his UFC-contract. Hall immediately landed a knee on Leben and landed multiple punches throughout the fight. Eventually, Hall dropped Leben with a punch in the first round, though Leben was saved by the round ending. Leben asked his trainer "Did I get knocked out?" He then stated "I'm done, man" and the fight was ended between the first and second round.

Hall fought through an injured toe against Thiago Santos at UFC 175 on July 5, 2014. He won the fight via unanimous decision.

Hall was expected to face Costas Philippou on January 18, 2015, at UFC Fight Night 59, a rematch of their previous fight in 2011. However, Philippou would be forced out of the bout due to injury. Hall was expected to face Strikeforce veteran Louis Taylor at the event, On January 11, it was announced that Taylor pulled out of the fight due to a pulled muscle in his back and had his contract terminated as a result. In turn, Hall faced promotional newcomer Ron Stallings, whom he defeated via TKO in the first round. Hall knocked Stallings down with a punch and followed up with several more on the ground. When Stallings returned to his feet, referee Herb Dean stopped the fight to check a cut that had opened up on Stallings' face, and the ringside doctor declared the cut too severe for Stallings to continue.

Hall lost via split decision against Rafael Natal on May 23, 2015, at UFC 187. Hall was expected to face Krzysztof Jotko on June 20, 2015, at UFC Fight Night 69, replacing an injured Derek Brunson. However, three days after the booking, Hall was removed due to an alleged visa issue. In turn, Jotko was removed from the card entirely. Hall was expected to face Joe Riggs on August 8, 2015, at UFC Fight Night 73, but Riggs pulled out of the fight in late July citing injury. Riggs was replaced by promotional newcomer Oluwale Bamgbose, whom Hall defeated by TKO in the first round.

Hall faced Gegard Mousasi on September 27, 2015, at UFC Fight Night 75, filling in for Roan Carneiro. After being taken down and dominated on the ground throughout the first round, Hall stunned Mousasi with a spinning kick followed by a flying knee and earned the TKO stoppage with a flurry of punches on the ground in the opening seconds of the second round. A significant underdog prior to the fight, Hall was awarded a Performance of The Night bonus.

Hall made a quick return to the cage as he faced Robert Whittaker on November 15, 2015, at UFC 193, replacing an injured Michael Bisping. Hall lost the fight by unanimous decision.

Hall was expected to face Anderson Silva on May 14, 2016, at UFC 198. However, Silva pulled out of the bout on May 10 after requiring a surgery to remove his gallbladder. As a result, Hall did not compete at the event.

Hall next faced Derek Brunson on September 17, 2016, at UFC Fight Night 94. Hall lost the fight by TKO in the first round.

Hall next faced Gegard Mousasi in a rematch on November 19, 2016, at UFC Fight Night 99. He lost the fight via TKO in the first round after being taken down and hit with multiple right hands.

Hall faced Krzysztof Jotko on September 16, 2017, at UFC Fight Night 116. After being rocked and mounted in the first round, Hall rallied in the second round and won via TKO due to punches. The win also earned Hall his second Performance of the Night bonus award.

Hall was expected to face Vitor Belfort on January 14, 2018, at UFC Fight Night: Stephens vs. Choi. However, on January 13, 2018, it was announced that Hall did not make it to weigh-in as he fainted en route to the weight-ins and the bout was cancelled.

Hall was expected to face Paulo Costa on April 21, 2018, at UFC Fight Night 128. However, Costa pulled out of the fight in mid-March with an arm injury. In turn, promotion officials elected to pull Hall from that event entirely and reschedule the pairing for July 7, 2018, at UFC 226. Hall lost the fight via technical knockout in round two.

Hall next faced newcomer Bevon Lewis on December 29, 2018, at UFC 232. He won the fight via knockout in the third round.

Hall faced Antônio Carlos Júnior on September 14, 2019, at UFC Fight Night 158. Hall won the fight via split decision.

Hall was scheduled to face Ronaldo Souza on April 14, 2020, at UFC 249. However, on April 9, Dana White, the president of UFC announced that this event was postponed and the bout was scheduled on May 9, 2020. On May 8, Souza withdrew from the fight after testing positive for COVID-19.

Hall was scheduled to face Yoel Romero on August 22, 2020, at UFC on ESPN 15. However, Romero pulled out of the fight on August 11 for undisclosed reasons. In turn, Hall was removed from the card and will be rescheduled for a future event.

Hall faced Anderson Silva on October 31, 2020, at UFC Fight Night 181. He won the fight via technical knockout in round four.

A rematch with Chris Weidman was expected to take place on February 13, 2021, at UFC 258 However, Weidman was pulled from the event due to a positive COVID-19 test and the bout was cancelled, The rematch took place at UFC 261 on April 24, 2021. At the start of the first round, Weidman threw a heavy outside low kick which Hall checked with his left knee. Weidman immediately fell to the mat - with his right tibia and fibula broken - forcing referee Herb Dean to stop the fight and declare Hall the winner via technical knockout. This win made Hall the first fighter in UFC history to win a fight without throwing a single strike.

Hall was expected to face Sean Strickland on August 7, 2021, at UFC 265. However on June 4, 2021, the bout was moved to headline UFC on ESPN: Hall vs. Strickland on July 31, 2021. Hall lost the fight via unanimous decision.

Hall was scheduled to face André Muniz on April 16, 2022, at UFC Fight Night 206. However, Hall withdrew due to undisclosed reasons. The bout with Muniz was rescheduled for UFC 276 on July 2. He lost the bout via unanimous decision.

On August 10, 2022, Hall announced his retirement from MMA competition.

=== Global Fight League ===
Hall was scheduled to come out of retirement to face former three-time Bellator Welterweight Champion Douglas Lima on May 25, 2025 at GFL 2. However, all GFL events were cancelled indefinitely.

== Boxing career ==
Hall was announced to make his boxing debut on a four-round cruiserweight fight against former American football player Le'Veon Bell as an undercard of the Jake Paul vs. Anderson Silva event on October 29, 2022, at the Desert Diamond Arena in Arizona. Hall won the fight via Unanimous Decision (40-36 x3)

Hall faced Julio César Chávez Jr. on July 20, 2024 at the Jake Paul vs. Mike Perry event in Tampa, Florida. He lost the bout by unanimous decision in a close match.

== Championships and accomplishments ==
- Ultimate Fighting Championship
  - The Ultimate Fighter 17 Knockout of the Season
  - The Ultimate Fighter 17 Tournament Runner-Up
  - Performance of the Night (Two times) vs. Gegard Mousasi and Krzysztof Jotko
  - Tied (Anderson Silva & Thiago Santos) for most knockout victories in UFC Middleweight division history (8)
  - UFC.com Awards
    - 2015: Ranked #8 Knockout of the Year & Ranked #5 Upset of the Year vs. Gegard Mousasi
- Ring of Combat
  - ROC Middleweight Championship (Two times)
- MMA Junkie
  - 2015 Comeback of the Year vs. Gegard Mousasi at UFC Fight Night: Barnett vs. Nelson
  - 2015 #4 Ranked Knockout of the Year vs. Gegard Mousasi at UFC Fight Night: Barnett vs. Nelson
  - 2015 September Knockout of the Month vs. Gegard Mousasi at UFC Fight Night: Barnett vs. Nelson

== Personal life ==
Hall had a role in the 2015 movie "Street” starring Beau "Casper" Smart.

== Mixed martial arts record ==
Professional record breakdown
28 matches	17 wins	11 losses
By knockout	13	4
By submission	1	0
By decision	3	7

Res.	Record	Opponent	Method	Event	Date	Round	Time	Location	Notes
Loss	17–11	André Muniz	Decision (unanimous)	UFC 276	July 2, 2022	3	5:00	Las Vegas, Nevada, United States	
Loss	17–10	Sean Strickland	Decision (unanimous)	UFC on ESPN: Hall vs. Strickland	July 31, 2021	5	5:00	Las Vegas, Nevada, United States	
Win	17–9	Chris Weidman	TKO (leg injury)	UFC 261	April 24, 2021	1	0:17	Jacksonville, Florida, United States	
Win	16–9	Anderson Silva	TKO (punches)	UFC Fight Night: Hall vs. Silva	October 31, 2020	4	1:24	Las Vegas, Nevada, United States	
Win	15–9	Antônio Carlos Júnior	Decision (split)	UFC Fight Night: Cowboy vs. Gaethje	September 14, 2019	3	5:00	Vancouver, British Columbia, Canada	
Win	14–9	Bevon Lewis	KO (punch)	UFC 232	December 29, 2018	3	1:32	Inglewood, California, United States	
Loss	13–9	Paulo Costa	TKO (punches)	UFC 226	July 7, 2018	2	2:38	Las Vegas, Nevada, United States	
Win	13–8	Krzysztof Jotko	TKO (punches)	UFC Fight Night: Rockhold vs. Branch	September 16, 2017	2	2:25	Pittsburgh, Pennsylvania, United States	Performance of the Night.
Loss	12–8	Gegard Mousasi	TKO (punches)	UFC Fight Night: Mousasi vs. Hall 2	November 19, 2016	1	4:37	Belfast, Northern Ireland	
Loss	12–7	Derek Brunson	TKO (punches)	UFC Fight Night: Poirier vs. Johnson	September 17, 2016	1	1:41	Hidalgo, Texas, United States	
Loss	12–6	Robert Whittaker	Decision (unanimous)	UFC 193	November 15, 2015	3	5:00	Melbourne, Australia	
Win	12–5	Gegard Mousasi	TKO (flying knee and punches)	UFC Fight Night: Barnett vs. Nelson	September 27, 2015	2	0:25	Saitama, Japan	Performance of the Night.
Win	11–5	Oluwale Bamgbose	TKO (punches)	UFC Fight Night: Teixeira vs. Saint Preux	August 8, 2015	1	2:32	Nashville, Tennessee, United States	
Loss	10–5	Rafael Natal	Decision (split)	UFC 187	May 23, 2015	3	5:00	Las Vegas, Nevada, United States	
Win	10–4	Ron Stallings	TKO (doctor stoppage)	UFC Fight Night: McGregor vs. Siver	January 18, 2015	1	3:37	Boston, Massachusetts, United States	
Win	9–4	Thiago Santos	Decision (unanimous)	UFC 175	July 5, 2014	3	5:00	Las Vegas, Nevada, United States	
Win	8–4	Chris Leben	TKO (retirement)	UFC 168	December 28, 2013	1	5:00	Las Vegas, Nevada, United States	
Loss	7–4	John Howard	Decision (split)	UFC Fight Night: Shogun vs. Sonnen	August 17, 2013	3	5:00	Boston, Massachusetts, United States	
Loss	7–3	Kelvin Gastelum	Decision (split)	The Ultimate Fighter: Team Jones vs. Team Sonnen Finale	April 13, 2013	3	5:00	Las Vegas, Nevada, United States	The Ultimate Fighter 17 Middleweight Tournament Final.
Win	7–2	Nodar Kudukhashvili	Decision (unanimous)	Ring of Combat 41	June 15, 2012	3	5:00	Atlantic City, New Jersey, United States	Won the vacant Ring of Combat Middleweight Championship.
Win	6–2	Daniel Akinyemi	Submission (heel hook)	Ring of Combat 39	February 10, 2012	1	4:48	Atlantic City, New Jersey, United States	
Win	5–2	Aung La Nsang	KO (punch)	Ring of Combat 35	April 8, 2011	3	1:37	Atlantic City, New Jersey, United States	
Loss	4–2	Costas Philippou	Decision (majority)	Ring of Combat 34	February 4, 2011	3	4:00	Atlantic City, New Jersey, United States	
Loss	4–1	Chris Weidman	TKO (punches)	Ring of Combat 31	September 24, 2010	1	3:06	Atlantic City, New Jersey, United States	Lost the Ring of Combat Middleweight Championship.
Win	4–0	Roger Carroll	TKO (submission to punch)	Ring of Combat 30	June 11, 2010	1	2:41	Atlantic City, New Jersey, United States	Won the vacant Ring of Combat Middleweight Championship.
Win	3–0	Mitch Whitesel	TKO (punches)	Ring of Combat 27	November 20, 2009	3	2:34	Atlantic City, New Jersey, United States	
Win	2–0	Edwin Aguilar	TKO (head kicks)	Bellator 11	June 12, 2009	3	4:31	Uncasville, Connecticut, United States	Middleweight debut.
Win	1–0	Mike Iannone	KO (punches)	Ring of Combat 9	October 29, 2005	1	0:44	Asbury Park, New Jersey, United States	Light Heavyweight debut.

Exhibition record breakdown		
4 matches	4 wins	0 losses
By knockout	3	0
By decision	1	0

Res.	Record	Opponent	Method	Event	Date	Round	Time	Location	Notes
Win	4–0	Dylan Andrews	TKO (punches)	The Ultimate Fighter: Team Jones vs. Team Sonnen	April 9, 2013 (airdate)	2	4:50	Las Vegas, Nevada, United States	TUF 17 Semi-Final round.
Win	3–0	Bubba McDaniel	KO (punch)	The Ultimate Fighter: Team Jones vs. Team Sonnen	April 2, 2013 (airdate)	1	0:08	Las Vegas, Nevada, United States	TUF 17 Quarter-Final round.
Win	2–0	Adam Cella	KO (spinning hook kick)	The Ultimate Fighter: Team Jones vs. Team Sonnen	February 5, 2013 (airdate)	1	4:55	Las Vegas, Nevada, United States	TUF 17 Preliminary round. Knockout of the Season.
Win	1–0	Andy Enz	Decision (unanimous)	The Ultimate Fighter: Team Jones vs. Team Sonnen	January 22, 2013 (airdate)	2	5:00	Las Vegas, Nevada, United States	TUF 17 Elimination round.

== Professional boxing record ==
2 fights	1 win	1 loss
By decision	1	1

No.	Result	Record	Opponent	Type	Round, time	Date	Location	Notes
2	Loss	1–1	Julio César Chávez Jr.	UD	6	Jul 20, 2024	Amalie Arena, Tampa, Florida, U.S.	
1	Win	1–0	Le'Veon Bell	UD	4	Oct 29, 2022	Desert Diamond Arena, Glendale, Arizona, U.S.	

== Karate Combat record ==
Professional record breakdown
3 matches	2 wins	1 loss
By knockout	1	0
By decision	1	1

Res.	Record	Opponent	Method	Event	Date	Round	Time	Location	Notes
Loss	2–1	Sam Alvey	Decision (unanimous)	Karate Combat 62	July 24, 2026	5	3:00	Miami, Florida	For the inaugural Karate Combat Light Heavyweight Championship.
Win	2–0	Jayden Eynaud	TKO (spinning back kick and punches)	Karate Combat 59	February 13, 2026	1	2:54	Miami, Florida, United States	
Win	1–0	Markus Perez	Decision (unanimous)	Karate Combat 57	October 31, 2025	4	3:00	Miami, Florida, United States	

== Kickboxing record ==
Professional Kickboxing record
Date	Result	Opponent	Event	Location	Method	Round	Time
2008-06-07	Win	(United States) Jesse Lawrence	World Combat League	New York City, United States	Points	2	3:00
2008-05-03	Win	(United States) Brandon Banda	World Combat League	Oklahoma, United States	KO (Right hook)	1	2:45
2008-05-03	Win	(United States) Jaime Fletcher	World Combat League	Oklahoma, United States	Points	1	3:00
2008-03-28	Win	(United States) Dusty Miller	World Combat League	United States	TKO	1	
2008-02-23	Win	(United States) Armin Mirkanovic	World Combat League	Denver, Colorado, United States	Points	1	3:00
2008-02-23	Win	(United States) Armin Mirkanovic	World Combat League	Denver, Colorado, United States	Points	1	3:00
2008-01-18	Win	(United States) Jopsh Devore	World Combat League	Denver, Colorado, United States	TKO (Punches)	1	2:48
2007-12-01	Win	(Nicaragua) Leo Valdivia	World Combat League	Atlantic City, New Jersey, United States	Points	2	3:00
Legend: Win Loss Draw/No contest Notes

== See also ==
- List of male boxers
- List of male mixed martial artists
- List of mixed martial artists with professional boxing records
- List of multi-sport athletes
- List of prizefighters with professional boxing and kickboxing records
