= UFC 183 =

UFC mixed martial arts event in 2015

UFC 183: Silva vs. Diaz
- The poster for UFC 183: Silva vs. Diaz
- Promotion: Ultimate Fighting Championship
- Date: January 31, 2015
- Venue: MGM Grand Garden Arena
- City: Las Vegas, Nevada
- Attendance: 13,114
- Total gate: $4,500,000
- Buyrate: 650,000

Event chronology
UFC on Fox: Gustafsson vs. Johnson	UFC 183: Silva vs. Diaz	UFC Fight Night: Henderson vs. Thatch

UFC 183: Silva vs. Diaz was a mixed martial arts event held on January 31, 2015, at MGM Grand Garden Arena in Las Vegas, Nevada.

== Background ==
The event was headlined by a middleweight bout between former UFC Middleweight champion Anderson Silva and former WEC & Strikeforce Welterweight champion Nick Diaz.

A flyweight bout between Ian McCall and John Lineker was originally booked for UFC Fight Night: Shogun vs. St. Preux. However, the bout was canceled on the day of the event as McCall was stricken with a blood infection. The fight was later rescheduled for this event.

A middleweight bout between Ed Herman and Derek Brunson was originally booked for UFC on Fox: dos Santos vs. Miocic. However, the bout was cancelled on the day of the event as Brunson was stricken with a stomach ailment. The fight was later rescheduled for this event.

Both Kelvin Gastelum and John Lineker missed weight on their first attempts at the weigh ins, coming in at 180 lb and 130 lb respectively. They were both given additional time to make the weight limits for their respective weight classes, but made no attempts to cut further. Instead, they were both fined 30 percent of their fight purses, which went to Tyron Woodley and Ian McCall respectively. This marked the fourth time that Lineker missed weight in his UFC career. As a result, UFC President Dana White stated both fighters will have to move up a weight class for their next fights, due to their recurring issues with weight cutting.

A featherweight bout between Jimy Hettes and Diego Brandão, slated for the Fight Pass preliminary portion of the card was canceled right before the event started, as Hettes passed out backstage. He was taken to a local hospital for precautionary reasons. Subsequently, both fighters were paid their show money.

=== Failed drug tests ===
On February 3, it was announced that both fighters involved in the main event failed drug tests. Anderson Silva failed a pre-fight test administered by the Nevada State Athletic Commission on January 9. The results came in on the day of the announcement and revealed Silva failed a drug test for drostanolone metabolites, which is an anabolic steroid. Silva also had traces of androsterone, a form of endogenous testosterone and also another banned substance. Silva was also tested on January 19 and on the night of the event. Further testing was expected to be conducted by the Commission to confirm these preliminary results. On the other hand, Nick Diaz had an amount of marijuana metabolites over the allowable limit in his post-fight test. This was the third time that Diaz has failed drug tests to marijuana. NSAC chairman Francisco Aguilar confirmed that the fight had not yet been overturned and couldn't be until a motion was passed by a majority of the commission. Any penalties, suspensions or changes to the outcome of the fight had to be presented as a motion which would then be voted on by the commission to enact the order. On February 9, the result of Silva's drug test on January 19 was revealed to be negative. On February 11, 2015, it was reported that Silva failed a drug test for an additional unknown illegal substance in a separate test that was related to UFC 183. The NSAC revealed in their meeting held on February 17, that Silva's second test failure was related to fight night tests. His pre-fight test was positive for drostanolone metabolites, while his post-fight test was positive for oxazepam and temazepam. Those medications are used to treat anxiety and insomnia, respectively.

On August 13, after several reschedules, the disciplinary hearing was held to decide on the subject. Silva's defense argued that a tainted sexual enhancement supplement was the root of the two failed tests for drostanolone and also appealed to mistakes in the NSAC testing procedures, pointing to a pair of drug tests, one on Jan. 19 and one after the fight, which Silva passed. He admitted to using both benzodiazepines the night prior to the fight as therapy to control stress and help him sleep. Silva's team was unable to explain the presence of androsterone in the Jan. 9 test. The commission rejected the defense and suspended him for one year retroactive to the date of the fight, as the current guidelines were not in effect at the time of the failed tests. He was also fined his full win bonus, as well as 30% of his show money, totaling $380,000. His victory was overturned to a no contest. Diaz's hearing was delayed until September. On September 14, Diaz was suspended for five years and also fined 33% of his show purse totaling $165,000. Following his appeal four months later in January 2016, the suspension and fine were reduced to 18 months and $100,000 respectively.

== Results ==
Main Card
Weight class				Method	Round	Time	Notes
Middleweight	Anderson Silva	vs.	Nick Diaz	No Contest (overturned)	5	5:00	(Note: Originally a unanimous decision (49-46, 50-45, 50-45) win for Silva; overturned after he failed a drug test for drostanolone and androsterone. Diaz also failed a drug test for marijuana.)
Catchweight (180 lb)	Tyron Woodley	def.	Kelvin Gastelum	Decision (split) (28–29, 29–28, 30–27)	3	5:00
Lightweight	Al Iaquinta	def.	Joe Lauzon	TKO (punches)	2	3:34
Middleweight	Thales Leites	def.	Tim Boetsch	Technical Submission (arm-triangle choke)	2	3:45
Welterweight	Thiago Alves	def.	Jordan Mein	TKO (body kick)	2	0:39
Preliminary Card (Fox Sports 1)
Women's Bantamweight	Miesha Tate	def.	Sara McMann	Decision (majority) (29–28, 29–27, 28–28)	3	5:00
Middleweight	Derek Brunson	def.	Ed Herman	TKO (punches)	1	0:36
Catchweight (130 lb)	John Lineker	def.	Ian McCall	Decision (unanimous) (29–28, 29–28, 29–28)	3	5:00
Middleweight	Rafael Natal	def.	Tom Watson	Decision (unanimous) (30–27, 30–27, 30–26)	3	5:00
Preliminary Card (UFC Fight Pass)
Middleweight	Ildemar Alcântara	def.	Richardson Moreira	Decision (split) (29–28, 28–29, 29–28)	3	5:00
Middleweight	Thiago Santos	def.	Andy Enz	TKO (punches)	1	1:56

== Bonus awards ==
The following fighters were awarded $50,000 bonuses:

- Fight of the Night: Thales Leites vs. Tim Boetsch
- Performance of the Night: Thales Leites and Thiago Alves

== Reported payout ==
The following is the reported payout to the fighters as reported to the Nevada State Athletic Commission. It does not include sponsor money and also does not include the UFC's traditional "fight night" bonuses.

- Anderson Silva: $800,000 (includes $200,000 win bonus) vs. Nick Diaz: $500,000
- Tyron Woodley: $139,000 (includes $65,000 win bonus) def. Kelvin Gastelum: $21,000 ^
- Al Iaquinta: $36,000 (includes $18,000 win bonus) def. Joe Lauzon: $36,000
- Thales Leites: $48,000 (includes $24,000 win bonus) def. Tim Boetsch: $52,000
- Thiago Alves: $84,000 (includes $42,000 win bonus) def. Jordan Mein: $22,000
- Miesha Tate: $76,000 (includes $38,000 win bonus) def. Sara McMann: $25,000
- Derek Brunson: $50,000 (includes $25,000 win bonus) def. Ed Herman: $47,000
- John Lineker: $35,700 (includes $21,000 win bonus) def. Ian McCall: $22,300 ^^
- Rafael Natal: $58,000 (includes $29,000 win bonus) def. Tom Watson: $16,000
- Ildemar Alcântara: $32,000 (includes $16,000 win bonus) def. Richardson Moreira: $8,000
- Thiago Santos: $26,000 (includes $13,000 win bonus) def. Andy Enz: $8,000

^ Kelvin Gastelum was fined 30 percent of his purse ($9,000) for failing to make the required weight for his fight with Tyron Woodley. That money was issued to Woodley, an NSAC official confirmed.
However, Woodley said he would give the money back to Gastelum.

^^ John Lineker was fined 30 percent of his purse ($6,300) for failing to make the required weight for his fight with Ian McCall. That money was issued to McCall, an NSAC official confirmed.

== See also ==
- List of UFC events
- 2015 in UFC
