= The Ultimate Fighter: Team Jones vs. Team Sonnen =

UFC mixed martial arts television series and event in 2013

- Genre: Reality, Sports
- Created by: Frank Fertitta III, Lorenzo Fertitta, Dana White
- Starring: Dana White, Jon Jones, and Chael Sonnen
- Country of origin: United States

Production
- Running time: 60 minutes

Original release
- Network: FX
- Release: January 22, 2013

The Ultimate Fighter: Team Jones vs. Team Sonnen (also known as The Ultimate Fighter 17) is the seventeenth installment of the Ultimate Fighting Championship (UFC)-produced reality television series The Ultimate Fighter.

The series was officially announced by the UFC in October 2012 with Light Heavyweight Champion Jon Jones coaching opposite Chael Sonnen. The two coaches met in a title fight on April 27, 2013 at UFC 159. This move drew criticism from MMA critics and fans, as many felt that Sonnen, who had previously lost his last match and not competed in the UFC Light Heavyweight division in years, had not done enough to earn a title shot.

This season was the first to air on Tuesdays, after The Ultimate Fighter: Live and The Ultimate Fighter: Team Carwin vs. Team Nelson's failure to generate the desired ratings for FX on Friday evenings.

== Cast ==
=== Coaches ===
Team Jones

- Jon Jones, head coach
- Stonehorse Goeman, Muay Thai Coach
- Frank Mir, jiu jitsu coach
- Bubba Jenkins, wrestling coach
- John Woods
- Ricky Lundell, wrestling/grappling Coach

Team Sonnen

- Chael Sonnen, head coach
- Vinny Magalhães, jiu jitsu coach
- Clayton Hires, boxing coach
- Scott McQuary
- Jamie Huey
- Mike Dolce, nutritionist

=== Fighters ===
- Team Sonnen
  - Luke Barnatt, Uriah Hall, Zak Cummings, Tor Troéng, Jimmy Quinlan, Kevin Casey, Kelvin Gastelum
- Team Jones
  - Clint Hester, Josh Samman, Robert "Bubba" McDaniel, Gilbert Smith, Collin Hart, Adam Cella, Dylan Andrews

Fighters eliminated during the entry round

- Kito Andrews, Lou Bercier, Ryan Bigler, Andy Enz, Nik Fekete, Jake Heun, Mike Jasper, Nicholas Kohring, Fraser Opie, Mike Persons, Scott Rosa, Eldon Sproat, Eric Wahlin, Tim Williams

== Episodes ==
Episode 1: "Enter the Octagon" (January 22, 2013)

- Dana White greeted the head coaches, Jon Jones and Chael Sonnen, in the Ultimate Fighter training center.
- Unlike previous seasons, the 28 middleweights were allowed to bring family and friends to watch their preliminary fights held in order to see who got into the house.
- The preliminary fights began:

Adam Cella defeated Jake Heun via submission (armbar) in the first round.
Zak Cummings defeated Nik Fekete by KO (punches) in the first round.
Kevin Casey defeated Eldon Sproat via submission (rear naked choke).
Tor Troeng defeated Scott Rosa via submission (rear naked choke).
Clint Hester defeated Fraser Opie by decision.
Bubba McDaniel defeated Ryan Bigler via TKO (punches) in the second round.
Josh Samman defeated Lou Bercier via TKO (punches) in the first round.
Kelvin Gastelum defeated Kito Andrews by decision.
Jimmy Quinlan defeated Mike Persons via TKO (punches) in the first round.
Uriah Hall defeated Andy Enz by decision.
Gilbert Smith defeated Eric Wahlin via submission (arm triangle choke)
Luke Barnatt defeated Nicholas Kohring by decision.
Dylan Andrews defeated Tim Williams by decision.
Collin Hart defeated Mike Jasper via submission (rear naked choke) in the first round.

- White announced that there would be a $5,000 bonus per finish during the tournament; additionally, fighters could receive $25,000 for Knockout of the Season, Submission of the Season and Fight of the Season.
- Team Jones and Team Sonnen then picked teams and White flipped a coin (red for Jones, black for Sonnen). Sonnen won the coin toss and opted to choose the first fighter. The fighters were picked in the following order:

Coach	1st Pick	2nd Pick	3rd Pick	4th Pick	5th Pick	6th Pick	7th Pick
Sonnen	Luke Barnatt	Uriah Hall	Zak Cummings	Tor Troeng	Jimmy Quinlan	Kevin Casey	Kelvin Gastelum
Jones	Clint Hester	Josh Samman	Bubba McDaniel	Gilbert Smith	Collin Hart	Adam Cella	Dylan Andrews

- Jones then matched Smith against Barnatt, feeling that the much shorter fighter taking out Sonnen's first pick would boost a lot of morale for his team.

Episode 2: "Ambush" (January 29, 2013)

- The red team voiced their displeasure with Jones' choice to match the 5'9" Gilbert Smith against the 6'6" Luke Barnatt.
- On the ride back to the house, Smith talked about the lack of positive feedback he received during training. After they reached the house, he proceeded to cry when thinking about his family.
- Team Jones called out Smith in the locker room about his emotional condition which left him upset. Jones then entered and reaffirmed his faith in Smith.
- Sonnen visited his team at the house. He took Uriah Hall aside and told him he would rather that he get an easy fight for his preliminary bout. However, Hall disagreed and stated he rather fight the top picks from the opposing team.
- Luke Barnatt defeated Gilbert Smith via KO (flying knee) in the second round.
- Immediately after the fight, Bubba McDaniel called out Kevin Casey who felt disrespected by the sudden call out.
- With the black team now in control, Sonnen selected Hall to fight Team Jones' Adam Cella.

Episode 3: "Embrace the Suffering" (February 5, 2013)

- On the ride back to the house, Kevin Casey continued to voice his displeasure with Bubba McDaniel's call out of him. He explained to his team that he still had a cut healing on his forehead.
- Back at the house, Uriah Hall mentioned to the other members of the house that he had heard that Tor Troeng was a "professional cooker," in which Josh Samman then corrected him by saying that the term is "chef." Hall was then angered about the tone in which Samman corrected him with which left him claiming that he would call out Samman next. He then proceeded to talk about the times he was bullied as a teen.
- After a training session, Hall met with Sonnen in a one-on-one to talk about his inner demons. Sonnen proceeded to explain to Hall about his own similar situation and on how he dealt with his demons.
- On the ride to the gym, Casey told his team that he rather fight McDaniel at a later time. His teammate Jimmy Quinlan then proceeded to tease him for being scared.
- Before the second preliminary match, Casey's picture was already hung on the tournament bracket signaling that he would fight next. McDaniel proceeded to hang his own picture on the bracket to bait Team Sonnen into matching them up.
- Jones visited his team at the house, bringing along food to grill. Each member of the team then talked about what being in the UFC would mean to them.
- Uriah Hall defeated Adam Cella via KO (spinning hook kick) in first round.
- After the knockout, Cella remained unconscious on the canvas for quite some time. He eventually regained consciousness and was taken to the hospital.
- In the locker room, Team Sonnen remarked on how Hall pretty much sealed the deal for getting the "Knockout of the Season" bonus. White entered shortly after and remarked the same thing.
- With Sonnen's team still in control, Casey was matched up against Team Jones' Collin Hart, much to the dismay of McDaniel.

Episode 4: "Sign of Disrespect" (February 12, 2013)

- Kevin Casey, Gilbert Smith, and Clint Hester had a freestyle rap battle in the house.
- During a power outage in the house, Team Sonnen decided to prank the red team by wrapping them up in toilet paper while they were sleeping. However, the joke was unsuccessful when they just threw the rolls of paper into Team Jones' rooms and ran.
- During the weigh-ins, Hart flipped off Casey, which led to an intense staredown between the two.
- Taken by surprise by Hart's actions, Uriah Hall confronted him at the house and asked why he was disrespectful towards Casey and Team Sonnen. Hart replies that he was in the moment of television and was upset that Casey disturbed his sleep.
- Collin Hart defeated Kevin Casey via unanimous decision.
- Now with Jones' team back in control, he announced the next fight: Bubba McDaniel vs. Kelvin Gastelum. At 21 years old, Gastelum is the youngest fighter in the history of the show.

Episode 5: "The Reflection of Perfection" (February 19, 2013)

- Sonnen visited the house and they played a game of charades. However, Bubba McDaniel, who is focused on his fight, decides not to join the game.
- Josh Samman begins to emerge as Team Jones' unofficial captain.
- Samman informed the coaches that he preferred to fight later since he had some injuries. Jones was receptive but the other coaches felt Samman was taking too much control over the team.
- Actor Mickey Rourke visited the Team Sonnen fighters at the house to share insights from his days when he was a boxer.
- Sonnen received a call from UFC women's bantamweight champion Ronda Rousey, who wished Kelvin Gastelum good luck on his fight and said that if he won, she would come down to the TUF gym and teach a session.
- Kelvin Gastelum defeated Bubba McDaniel via submission (rear naked choke) in the second round.
- Now with Sonnen's team back in control, he matched Tor Troeng against Samman.

Episode 6: "Path to Greatness" (February 26, 2013)

- During practice, Uriah Hall's hard punching while sparring with Luke Barnatt rubbed him the wrong way, which caused him and the rest of the team to think that Hall was not a team player.
- Hall later ignited a blow-up at the house when he was asked by Gilbert Smith who he wanted to fight next and he answered Barnatt, his own teammate. This caused Team Jones to confront the Jamaican, asking him to join their team. But Hall's remark towards Adam Cella's girlfriend caused a rift between both teams.
- The coaches took their teams bowling at Red Rock Casino. Sonnen then challenged Jones to a bowling match, betting whoever bowls the lowest score after three-frames had to coach a session for the other team while wearing that team's jersey. Jones lost and agreed to the terms.
- Josh Samman told the coaches about almost losing his left leg to a blood clot in the past.
- Josh Samman defeated Tor Troeng via KO (punches) in the first round.
- Now with the red team in control, Jones matched his number one pick Clint Hester against Jimmy Quinlan.
- Sonnen liked it, thinking it was a bad match style-wise for Hester.

Episode 7: "His Fist on My Face" (March 5, 2013)

- After winning his fight, Josh Samman's recurring leg pain landed him in the hospital emergency room.
- The guys got a night out when their coaches took them to Hooters to lift their spirits. However, not wanting outside distraction, Uriah Hall alienated himself from the group because he would rather concentrate on fighting.
- Jimmy Quinlan defeated Clint Hester via submission (rear naked choke) in the second round.
- After the fight, Sonnen entered the red team's locker room to uphold the bet he and Jones made during bowling three frames. Much to Jones' dislike, Sonnen gave him a black jersey to wear while coaching.
- The final match-up of the opening round by default was Dylan Andrews vs. Zak Cummings.

Episode 8: "Bag of Tools" (March 12, 2013)

- Bubba McDaniel was stressed over being picked for the wildcard match-up and vented to Adam Cella.
- This season's "Coaches Challenge" put Jones and Sonnen against each other in three different "dig it" competitions while driving excavators. Sonnen won the competition earning $10,000 for his team ($1,500 per fighter).
- Dylan Andrews defeated Zak Cummings via majority decision.
- After the fight, Dana White forced the coaches to decide on a wildcard match-up.
- Jones was left to make a difficult decision when he had to pick between his training partner McDaniel and Clint Hester, whom he calls a cool guy. Jones picked McDaniel because of all the years of hard work, while Sonnen picked Kevin Casey.

Episode 9: "The Wild Card" (March 19, 2013)

- Bubba McDaniel became emotional while talking about his family.
- During a training session, the coaches spent time building up McDaniel's confidence.
- Josh Samman called out Jimmy Quinlan because he wanted to be the next one to do that after McDaniel.
- Both teams celebrated Thanksgiving by having a huge feast at the house. However, McDaniel and Casey were unable to eat due to having to make weight.
- Bubba McDaniel defeated Kevin Casey via TKO (retirement) in the second round.
- McDaniel celebrated his win while Casey explained that a kidney failure during the fight was the reason that he could not answer the bell.
- The quarter final matchups were announced as:

- Collin Hart vs. Kelvin Gastelum
- Dylan Andrews vs. Luke Barnatt
- Josh Samman vs. Jimmy Quinlan
- Bubba McDaniel vs. Uriah Hall

Episode 10: "The Quarterfinals Begin" (March 26, 2013)

- Both teams were surprised with the match up between Bubba McDaniel and Uriah Hall, causing McDaniel to stress out over his tough opponent.
- Kelvin Gastelum got a surprise visit from Ronda Rousey, who guest coached Team Sonnen in judo techniques.
- The first two match-ups faced off with four fighters trying to secure a spot in the final four.
- Kelvin Gastelum defeated Collin Hart via TKO (punches) in the first round.
- Former world heavyweight boxing champion Mike Tyson made a guest appearance and gave both teams motivation as he sat cageside during the quarterfinal matches.
- Dylan Andrews defeated Luke Barnatt via TKO (punches) in the third round.
- The latter fight was notable in which Andrews, who was the last overall pick, defeated the first overall pick Barnatt.

Episode 11: "Vicious" (April 2, 2013)

- Bubba McDaniel did not participate in team practice due to back pain. This led Jones to tell Clint Hester to stay ready.
- McDaniel told Jones that he still wanted to fight, but felt frustrated because he believed White was putting him on the most difficult route.
- McDaniel went to get his blood tested at the doctor due to back pain.
- Josh Samman defeated Jimmy Quinlan via submission (punches) in the first round.
- Regarding Samman's double punch submission, Jones stated that this was not a move that he recommended.
- The doctor visited the gym and told McDaniel that his back pain was most likely a pulled muscle. Feeling motivated with the news, McDaniel got back to practice.
- Uriah Hall told his team in the locker room that he had heard that McDaniel was scared to fight him. Sonnen then remarked on how that type of attention on Hall was well deserved, calling him the most talented and hard working fighter on his team.
- During the weigh-ins, Jones was not happy with McDaniel's submissive body language during the stare-off with Hall.
- Uriah Hall defeated Bubba McDaniel via KO (punch) in the first round.
- After the fight, McDaniel remained on the canvas due to a pain in his eye. He then admitted to not remembering what he was hit with. White then stated that Hall was the "nastiest fighter in TUF history."
- The semifinal match-ups were announced as:

- Josh Samman vs. Kelvin Gastelum
- Dylan Andrews vs. Uriah Hall

Episode 12: "The Semis" (April 9, 2013)

- The final four fighters along with both coaches visit the Harley Davidson Motorcycles showroom to customize their bikes as one of the prizes for being The Ultimate Fighter.
- Kelvin Gastelum defeated Josh Samman via submission (rear naked choke) in the first round.
- Uriah Hall defeated Dylan Andrews via TKO (punches) in the second round.
- White was amazed at how Hall had managed to get up to the top position from the bottom, having given up a kimura attempt to unload strikes to Andrews' head.
- The black team had two fighters in the finale; that meant Sonnen, as the winning coach, would get a custom Harley Davidson motorcycle.
- The finalists were announced as Hall and Gastelum, both of Team Sonnen.

== Tournament bracket ==
Elimination Round
Colin Hart	UD
Kevin Casey	2
Bubba McDaniel	2
Kelvin Gastelum	SUB
Josh Samman	KO
Tor Troeng	1
Clint Hester	2
Jimmy Quinlan	SUB
Dylan Andrews	MD
Zak Cummings	2
Gilbert Smith Jr.	2
Luke Barnatt	KO
Bubba McDaniel	TKO
Kevin Casey	2
Adam Cella	1
Uriah Hall	KO

Quarter-finals
Colin Hart	1
Kelvin Gastelum	KO
Josh Samman	SUB
Jimmy Quinlan	1
Dylan Andrews	KO
Luke Barnatt	3
Bubba McDaniel	1
Uriah Hall	KO

Semi-finals
Kelvin Gastelum	SUB
Josh Samman	1
Dylan Andrews	2
Uriah Hall	TKO

Finale
Kelvin Gastelum	SD
Uriah Hall	3

Legend
	Team Jones
	Team Sonnen
UD	Unanimous Decision
MD	Majority Decision
SD	Split Decision
SUB	Submission
(T) KO	(Technical) Knockout

Fighters were awarded $25,000 bonuses. Fans chose the winners of the season bonuses.

- Fight of the Season: Dylan Andrews vs. Luke Barnatt
- Knockout of the Season: Uriah Hall
- Submission of the Season: Kelvin Gastelum

== The Ultimate Fighter 17 Finale ==
The Ultimate Fighter: Team Jones vs. Team Sonnen Finale
- The poster for The Ultimate Fighter: Team Jones vs. Team Sonnen Finale
- Promotion: Ultimate Fighting Championship
- Date: April 13, 2013
- Venue: Mandalay Bay Events Center
- City: Las Vegas, Nevada
- Attendance: 5,918
- Total gate: $569,075

Event chronology
UFC on Fuel TV: Mousasi vs. Latifi	The Ultimate Fighter: Team Jones vs. Team Sonnen Finale	UFC on Fox: Henderson vs. Melendez

The Ultimate Fighter: Team Jones vs. Team Sonnen Finale (also known as The Ultimate Fighter 17 Finale) was a mixed martial arts event held by the Ultimate Fighting Championship. It took place on April 13, 2013, at the Mandalay Bay Events Center in Las Vegas, Nevada.

=== Background ===
The event was expected to feature a Flyweight Championship bout between the then current champion Demetrious Johnson, and challenger John Moraga, as well as the middleweight tournament finals. However, Johnson was forced out of the bout with an injury and Moraga was removed from the event as well. As a result, the main event featured a bout between the former WEC Featherweight Champion Urijah Faber and long time bantamweight contender Scott Jorgensen.

The winner of the Miesha Tate vs. Cat Zingano bout was expected to coach against Ronda Rousey for the next season of The Ultimate Fighter.

== Results ==
Main card (FX)
Weight class				Method	Round	Time	Notes
Bantamweight	Urijah Faber	def.	Scott Jorgensen	Submission (rear-naked choke)	4	3:16
Middleweight	Kelvin Gastelum	def.	Uriah Hall	Decision (split) (29–28, 28–29, 29–28)	3	5:00	(Note: TUF 17 Middleweight Tournament Final.)
Women's Bantamweight	Cat Zingano	def.	Miesha Tate	TKO (knees and elbow)	3	2:55
Heavyweight	Travis Browne	def.	Gabriel Gonzaga	KO (elbows)	1	1:11
Middleweight	Bubba McDaniel	def.	Gilbert Smith	Submission (armbar)	3	2:49
Preliminary card (Fuel TV)
Middleweight	Josh Samman	def.	Kevin Casey	TKO (knees)	2	2:17
Middleweight	Luke Barnatt	def.	Collin Hart	Decision (unanimous) (29–28, 29–28, 30–27)	3	5:00
Middleweight	Dylan Andrews	def.	Jimmy Quinlan	TKO (punches)	1	3:22
Middleweight	Clint Hester	def.	Bristol Marunde	TKO (elbow)	3	3:53
Preliminary card (Facebook)
Featherweight	Cole Miller	def.	Bart Palaszewski	Submission (rear-naked choke)	1	4:23
Featherweight	Maximo Blanco	def.	Sam Sicilia	Decision (unanimous) (29–28, 29–28, 29–28)	3	5:00
Featherweight	Daniel Pineda	def.	Justin Lawrence	Submission (kimura)	1	1:35

=== Bonus Awards ===
Fighters were awarded $50,000 bonuses.

- Fight of the Night: Cat Zingano vs. Miesha Tate
- Knockout of the Night: Travis Browne
- Submission of the Night: Daniel Pineda

=== Reported payout ===
The following is the reported payout to the fighters as reported to the Nevada State Athletic Commission. It does not include sponsor money and also does not include the UFC's traditional "fight night" bonuses.

- Uriah Faber: $110,000 (includes $55,000 win bonus) def. Scott Jorgensen: $23,500
- Kelvin Gastelum: $16,000 (includes $8,000 win bonus) def. Uriah Hall: $8,000
- Cat Zingano: $14,000 (includes $7,000 win bonus) def. Miesha Tate: $28,000
- Travis Browne: $40,000 (includes $20,000 win bonus) def. Gabriel Gonzaga: $24,000
- Robert McDaniel: $16,000 (includes $8,000 win bonus) def. Gilbert Smith: $8,000
- Josh Samman: $16,000 (includes $8,000 win bonus) def. Kevin Casey: $8,000
- Luke Barnatt: $16,000 (includes $8,000 win bonus) def. Collin Hart: $8,000
- Dylan Andrews: $16,000 (includes $8,000 win bonus) def. Jimmy Quinlan: $8,000
- Clint Hester: $16,000 (includes $8,000 win bonus) def. Bristol Marunde: $8,000
- Cole Miller: $42,000 (includes $21,000 win bonus) def. Bart Palaszewski: $15,000
- Maximo Blanco: $26,000 (includes $13,000 win bonus) def. Sam Sicilia: $8,000
- Daniel Pineda: $26,000 (includes $13,000 win bonus) def. Justin Lawrence: $8,000

== Coaches' fight ==
UFC 159 was held on April 27, 2013 in Newark, New Jersey.

- Light Heavyweight Championship bout: Jon Jones (c) vs. Chael Sonnen

Jon Jones (c) defeated Chael Sonnen via TKO (elbows and punches) after 4:33 in the first round.

== See also ==
- The Ultimate Fighter
- List of current UFC fighters
- List of UFC events
- 2013 in UFC
