= Al Iaquinta =

American mixed martial artist (born 1987)

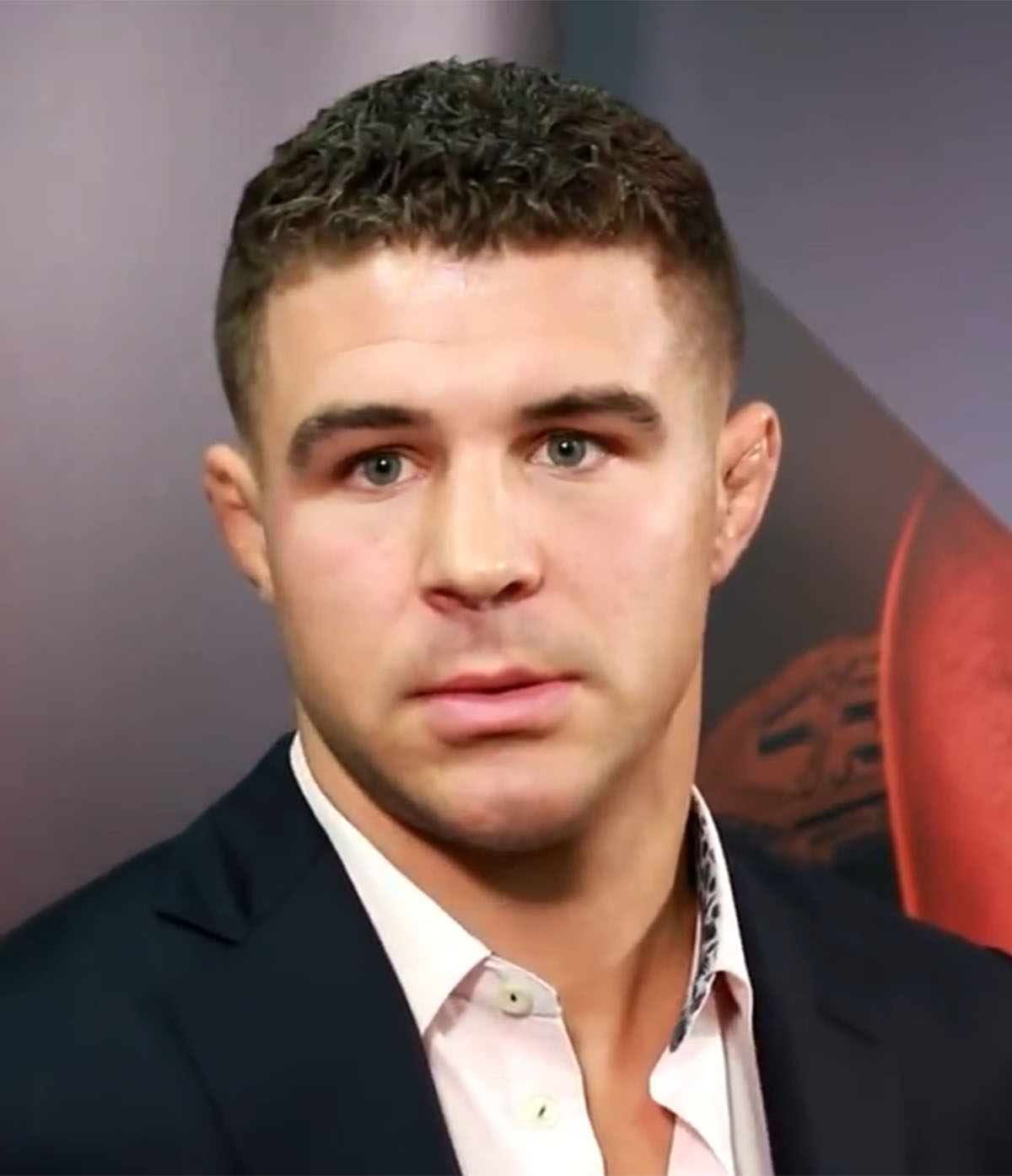
- Al Iaquinta in November 2018
- Born: April 30, 1987 (age 39); Valley Stream, New York, U.S.
- Nickname: Raging
- Height: 5 ft 10 in (1.78 m)
- Weight: 155 lb (70 kg; 11.1 st)
- Division: Lightweight
- Reach: 70 in (178 cm)
- Fighting out of: Wantagh, New York, U.S.
- Team: Serra-Longo Fight Team
- Rank: Purple belt in Brazilian Jiu-Jitsu under Matt Serra
- Years active: 2009–2021

Mixed martial arts record
- Total: 22
- Wins: 14
- By knockout: 7
- By submission: 1
- By decision: 6
- Losses: 7
- By knockout: 1
- By submission: 3
- By decision: 3
- Draws: 1

Amateur record
- Total: 14
- Wins: 14
- Losses: 0

Other information
- Website: aliaquinta.com
- Mixed martial arts record from Sherdog

Al Iaquinta (born April 30, 1987) is an American former professional mixed martial artist who competed in the lightweight division of the Ultimate Fighting Championship, having once challenged for the Lightweight championship belt. A professional MMA competitor since 2009, Iaquinta has been signed with the UFC since 2012.

== Mixed martial arts career ==
=== Early career ===
Iaquinta, who is of Italian descent, wrestled at Wantagh High School and went on to earn his associate degree from Nassau Community College, where he also wrestled. Before turning pro, Iaquinta had a perfect amateur record of 14–0. Iaquinta began his pro MMA career fighting for the Ring of Combat promotion. There, he earned a record of 5–1–1.

=== The Ultimate Fighter ===
Iaquinta was one of 32 lightweight fighters announced by the UFC to participate in first live season of The Ultimate Fighter reality show. Iaquinta advanced into the TUF house by defeating Jon Tuck by unanimous decision after one round. Afterwards, he was chosen as first pick for Team Faber.

After his team lost the first two matches, Iaquinta earned the first win for Team Faber by defeating Myles Jury via split decision after three rounds.

In the quarter-finals, Iaquinta fought Team Faber teammate, Andy Ogle. Iaquinta won via TKO in the closing moments of round one. The win advanced Iaquinta into the semi-finals where he faced Team Cruz's Vinc Pichel. Iaquinta defeated Pichel via unanimous decision after two rounds and moved on to the finals against teammate Michael Chiesa.

=== Ultimate Fighting Championship ===
Iaquinta officially made his UFC debut at The Ultimate Fighter 15 Finale on June 1, 2012, against Michael Chiesa to determine the winner of The Ultimate Fighter: Live. Iaquinta lost to Chiesa by submission due to a rear naked choke early in the first round.

Iaquinta was expected to face Joe Proctor on April 27, 2013, at UFC 159. However, the bout was scrapped as both fighters sustained training injuries leading up to the fight.

Iaquinta faced Ryan Couture on August 31, 2013, at UFC 164, replacing an injured Quinn Mulhern. He won the bout via unanimous decision, after dominating the fight on the feet and negating all of Couture's takedown attempts.

Iaquinta was expected to face Anthony Njokuani on October 26, 2013, at UFC Fight Night 30, replacing an injured Paul Taylor. Then on September 24, Njokuani pulled out of the event with an injury. Iaquinta instead faced Piotr Hallmann. He won the fight by unanimous decision (29–28, 30–27, and 30–27).

Iaquinta faced Kevin Lee at UFC 169 on February 8, 2014. He won the fight by unanimous decision (29–28, 29–28, and 28–27).

Iaquinta faced Mitch Clarke at UFC 173 on May 24, 2014. He lost the fight via submission (D'arce choke) in the second round.

Iaquinta faced Rodrigo Damm at UFC Fight Night 50 on September 5, 2014. Iaquinta defeated Damm via third-round TKO.

Iaquinta faced Ross Pearson on November 8, 2014, at UFC Fight Night 55. Despite being the underdog, Iaquinta won the fight via TKO in the second round.

Iaquinta faced Joe Lauzon on January 31, 2015, at UFC 183. He won the fight via TKO in the second round.

Iaquinta faced Jorge Masvidal on April 4, 2015, at UFC Fight Night 63. He won the bout via controversial split decision. 13 of 15 media outlets scored the bout in favor of Masvidal.

Iaquinta was expected to face Bobby Green on July 15, 2015, at UFC Fight Night 71. However, Green pulled out of the fight in mid-June, citing an undisclosed injury, and he was replaced by Gilbert Melendez. Subsequently, Melendez was removed from the card on July 6, after it was revealed that he tested positive for performance-enhancing drugs after his previous fight at UFC 188. In turn, Iaquinta was removed from the card as well.

Iaquinta was expected to face Thiago Alves on November 12, 2016, at UFC 205. However, Iaquinta announced on September 19 that he would not be taking the fight due to a contract dispute with the promotion.

After two years away from the sport, Iaquinta returned to face Diego Sanchez on April 22, 2017, at UFC Fight Night 108. He won the fight via knockout in the first round.

Iaquinta was expected to face Paul Felder on December 2, 2017, at UFC 218. However, Iaquinta pulled out of the fight on October 31 due to being unsatisfied with his current contract, and he was replaced by Charles Oliveira.

=== UFC Lightweight Championship fight ===
The bout with Felder was rescheduled and was expected to take place on April 7, 2018, at UFC 223. However, because of an injury to interim UFC Lightweight Champion Tony Ferguson and the state athletic commission's decision to pull replacement UFC Featherweight Champion Max Holloway over concerns over his weight cut, Iaquinta was scheduled as a replacement against Khabib Nurmagomedov in the five round main event. Although the fight was scheduled for the vacant UFC Lightweight Championship, only Nurmagomedov was eligible to win the championship due to Iaquinta weighing in at 155.2 lbs which is two tenths of a pound over the championship weight limit of 155. Iaquinta had already weighed in for his fight against Paul Felder prior to officially being announced as the new replacement. Non-championship bouts allow fighters to weigh in one pound over the limit. Ultimately, Iaquinta lost the fight via unanimous decision (44–50, 43–50, and 43–50).

=== Post UFC Lightweight Championship fight ===
Iaquinta was scheduled to face Justin Gaethje on August 25, 2018, at UFC Fight Night 135. However, on June 28, 2018, Iaquinta withdrew from the bout, and he was replaced by James Vick.

Iaquinta faced Kevin Lee in a rematch on December 15, 2018, at UFC on Fox 31. He won the fight by unanimous decision. This win earned him the Performance of the Night award.

Iaquinta faced Donald Cerrone on May 4, 2019, at UFC Fight Night 151. He lost the fight via unanimous decision. This fight earned him the Fight of the Night bonus award.

Iaquinta faced Dan Hooker on October 6, 2019, at UFC 243. He lost the fight via unanimous decision.

Iaquinta faced Bobby Green on November 6, 2021, at UFC 268. Iaquinta lost the fight via first round TKO, marking the first time that he lost by TKO in his professional MMA career.

Iaquinta said in an interview on the MMA Hour he wasn't sure if he was retired yet and he's up in the air in regards to this.

=== Submission Underground ===
On February 23, 2020, Iaquinta faced Mike Perry at Chael Sonnen's Submission Underground 11 event. He lost the fight via fastest escape time.

== Personal life ==
Iaquinta is a licensed real estate agent. He started the process of acquiring a license after a contract dispute for his fight against Thiago Alves at UFC 205.

== Championships and accomplishments ==
=== Mixed martial arts ===
- Ultimate Fighting Championship
  - Performance of the Night (One time) vs. Kevin Lee
  - Fight of the Night (One time) vs. Donald Cerrone
  - UFC.com Awards
    - 2014: Ranked #6 Upset of the Year vs. Ross Pearson
- Ring of Combat
  - ROC Lightweight Championship (One time)

== Mixed martial arts record ==
Professional record breakdown
22 matches	14 wins	7 losses
By knockout	7	1
By submission	1	3
By decision	6	3
Draws	1	

Res.	Record	Opponent	Method	Event	Date	Round	Time	Location	Notes
Loss	14–7–1	Bobby Green	TKO (punches)	UFC 268	November 6, 2021	1	2:25	New York City, New York, United States	
Loss	14–6–1	Dan Hooker	Decision (unanimous)	UFC 243	October 5, 2019	3	5:00	Melbourne, Victoria, Australia	
Loss	14–5–1	Donald Cerrone	Decision (unanimous)	UFC Fight Night: Iaquinta vs. Cowboy	May 4, 2019	5	5:00	Ottawa, Ontario, Canada	Fight of the Night.
Win	14–4–1	Kevin Lee	Decision (unanimous)	UFC on Fox: Lee vs. Iaquinta 2	December 15, 2018	5	5:00	Milwaukee, Wisconsin, United States	Performance of the Night.
Loss	13–4–1	Khabib Nurmagomedov	Decision (unanimous)	UFC 223	April 7, 2018	5	5:00	Brooklyn, New York, United States	For the vacant UFC Lightweight Championship. Iaquinta made weight (155.2 lbs) for his original fight with Paul Felder, but was ineligible to win the title due to not being at championship weight.
Win	13–3–1	Diego Sanchez	KO (punches)	UFC Fight Night: Swanson vs. Lobov	April 22, 2017	1	1:38	Nashville, Tennessee, United States	
Win	12–3–1	Jorge Masvidal	Decision (split)	UFC Fight Night: Mendes vs. Lamas	April 4, 2015	3	5:00	Fairfax, Virginia, United States	
Win	11–3–1	Joe Lauzon	TKO (punches)	UFC 183	January 31, 2015	2	3:34	Las Vegas, Nevada, United States	
Win	10–3–1	Ross Pearson	TKO (punches)	UFC Fight Night: Rockhold vs. Bisping	November 8, 2014	2	1:39	Sydney, Australia	
Win	9–3–1	Rodrigo Damm	TKO (punches and elbows)	UFC Fight Night: Jacaré vs. Mousasi	September 5, 2014	3	2:26	Mashantucket, Connecticut, United States	
Loss	8–3–1	Mitch Clarke	Technical Submission (D'Arce choke)	UFC 173	May 24, 2014	2	0:57	Las Vegas, Nevada, United States	
Win	8–2–1	Kevin Lee	Decision (unanimous)	UFC 169	February 1, 2014	3	5:00	Newark, New Jersey, United States	
Win	7–2–1	Piotr Hallmann	Decision (unanimous)	UFC Fight Night: Machida vs. Munoz	October 26, 2013	3	5:00	Manchester, England	
Win	6–2–1	Ryan Couture	Decision (unanimous)	UFC 164	August 31, 2013	3	5:00	Milwaukee, Wisconsin, United States	
Loss	5–2–1	Michael Chiesa	Technical Submission (rear-naked choke)	The Ultimate Fighter: Live Finale	June 1, 2012	1	2:47	Las Vegas, Nevada, United States	The Ultimate Fighter 15 Lightweight Tournament final.
Loss	5–1–1	Pat Audinwood	Submission (armbar)	Ring of Combat 38	November 18, 2011	1	2:06	Atlantic City, New Jersey, United States	Lost the ROC Lightweight Championship.
Win	5–0–1	Gabriel Miglioli	TKO (punches)	Ring of Combat 37	September 9, 2011	1	0:26	Atlantic City, New Jersey, United States	Won the vacant ROC Lightweight Championship.
Win	4–0–1	Gabriel Miglioli	Decision (split)	Ring of Combat 36	June 17, 2011	3	4:00	Atlantic City, New Jersey, United States	
Win	3–0–1	Joshua Key	TKO (punches)	Ring of Combat 27	November 20, 2009	1	1:47	Atlantic City, New Jersey, United States	Catchweight (161 lb) bout; Key missed weight.
Win	2–0–1	Tim Sylvester	KO (punch)	Ring of Combat 25	June 12, 2009	1	0:15	Atlantic City, New Jersey, United States	
Draw	1–0–1	Will Martinez	Draw (unanimous)	Ring of Combat 24	April 17, 2009	3	4:00	Atlantic City, New Jersey, United States	Iaquinta was deducted one point for fence grabbing.
Win	1–0	Mervin Rodriguez	Submission (anaconda choke)	Ring of Combat 23	February 20, 2009	1	1:15	Atlantic City, New Jersey, United States	

Exhibition record breakdown		
4 matches	4 wins	0 losses
By knockout	1	0
By decision	3	0

Res.	Record	Opponent	Method	Event	Date	Round	Time	Location	Notes
Win	4–0	Vinc Pichel	Decision (unanimous)	The Ultimate Fighter: Live	May 25, 2012 (Live airdate)	2	5:00	Las Vegas, Nevada, United States	The Ultimate Fighter 15 Semifinal round.
Win	3–0	Andy Ogle	TKO (elbow and punches)	The Ultimate Fighter: Live	May 18, 2012 (Live airdate)	1	4:44	Las Vegas, Nevada, United States	The Ultimate Fighter 15 Quarterfinal round. Knockout of the Season.
Win	2–0	Myles Jury	Decision (split)	The Ultimate Fighter: Live	March 30, 2012 (Live airdate)	3	5:00	Las Vegas, Nevada, United States	The Ultimate Fighter 15 Preliminary round. Fight of the Season.
Win	1–0	Jon Tuck	Decision (unanimous)	The Ultimate Fighter: Live	March 9, 2012 (Live airdate)	1	5:00	Las Vegas, Nevada, United States	The Ultimate Fighter 15 Elimination round.

== Pay-per-view bouts ==
No	Event	Fight	Date	Venue	City	PPV buys
1.	UFC 223	Khabib vs. Iaquinta	April 7, 2018	Barclays Center	Brooklyn, New York, United States	350,000

== See also ==
- List of male mixed martial artists
