= UFC 166 =

UFC mixed martial arts event in 2013

UFC 166: Velasquez vs. dos Santos III
- The poster for UFC 166: Velasquez vs. dos Santos III
- Promotion: Ultimate Fighting Championship
- Date: October 19, 2013
- Venue: Toyota Center
- City: Houston, Texas
- Attendance: 17,238
- Total gate: $2.5 million
- Buyrate: 330,000

Event chronology
UFC Fight Night: Maia vs. Shields	UFC 166: Velasquez vs. dos Santos III	UFC Fight Night: Machida vs. Muñoz

UFC 166: Velasquez vs. dos Santos III was a mixed martial arts event held on October 19, 2013, at the Toyota Center in Houston, Texas.

== Background ==
The main event was a UFC Heavyweight Championship bout between the current champion Cain Velasquez and top contender Junior dos Santos. The two have split their two previous encounters with Dos Santos winning the first bout via first round knockout at UFC on Fox: Velasquez vs. dos Santos and then Velasquez winning the rematch via unanimous decision at UFC 155.

A bout between Tony Ferguson and Khabib Nurmagomedov was rescheduled from UFC 164 however visa complications left Nurmagomedov unable to compete and was subsequently replaced by Mike Rio.

A bout between George Roop and Francisco Rivera was scheduled for this card, but was moved to UFC Fight Night 31 and replaced by Sarah Kaufman vs. Jessica Eye.

Matt Grice was expected to face Jeremy Larsen at the event. However, Grice was forced out of the bout after sustaining serious injuries in a September 8 car crash in his home state of Oklahoma. Grice was replaced by Charles Oliveira who also lost his original opponent, Estevan Payan, due to injury. Subsequently on October 5, Oliveira pulled out of the Larsen bout citing a strained thigh muscle. Larsen instead faced promotional newcomer Andre Fili.

Luke Rockhold was expected to face Tim Boetsch at the event. However, Rockhold was forced out of the bout citing a knee injury and was replaced by C. B. Dollaway.

Andre Fili weighed in 2.5 pounds too heavy. As a result, 20-percent of Fili's purse was forfeited to his opponent, Jeremy Larsen.

== Results ==
Main card
Weight class				Method	Round	Time	Notes
Heavyweight	Cain Velasquez (c)	def.	Junior dos Santos	TKO (slam and punch)	5	3:09	(Note: For the UFC Heavyweight Championship.)
Heavyweight	Daniel Cormier	def.	Roy Nelson	Decision (unanimous) (30–27, 30–27, 30–27)	3	5:00
Lightweight	Gilbert Melendez	def.	Diego Sanchez	Decision (unanimous) (29–28, 30–27, 29–28)	3	5:00
Heavyweight	Gabriel Gonzaga	def.	Shawn Jordan	KO (punches)	1	1:33
Flyweight	John Dodson	def.	Darrell Montague	KO (punch)	1	4:13
Preliminary card (Fox Sports 1)
Middleweight	Tim Boetsch	def.	C. B. Dollaway	Decision (split) (30–26, 27–29, 30–26)	3	5:00	(Note: Dollaway had 1 point deducted in round 3 for a second poke to the eye.)
Welterweight	Hector Lombard	def.	Nate Marquardt	KO (punches)	1	1:48
Women's Bantamweight	Jessica Eye	vs.	Sarah Kaufman	No Contest (overturned)	3	5:00	(Note: Originally ruled a Split Decision (29–28, 28–29, 29–28) victory for Eye, result overturned due to Eye testing positive for marijuana during a post fight screening.)
Lightweight	K. J. Noons	def.	George Sotiropoulos	Decision (unanimous) (29–28, 29–28, 30–27)	3	5:00
Preliminary card (Facebook/Youtube)
Welterweight	Adlan Amagov	def.	TJ Waldburger	KO (punches)	1	3:00	(Note: This bout aired on the broadcast following the Melendez vs Sanchez bout.)
Lightweight	Tony Ferguson	def.	Mike Rio	Submission (D'Arce choke)	1	1:52
Catchweight (148.5 lb)	Andre Fili	def.	Jeremy Larsen	TKO (punches)	2	0:53
Bantamweight	Kyoji Horiguchi	def.	Dustin Pague	TKO (punches)	2	3:51

== Bonus awards ==
The following fighters received $60,000 bonuses.

- Fight of The Night: Gilbert Melendez vs. Diego Sanchez
- Knockout of The Night: John Dodson
- Submission of the Night: Tony Ferguson

== See also ==
- List of UFC events
- 2013 in UFC
