= Mike Rio =

American mixed martial arts fighter

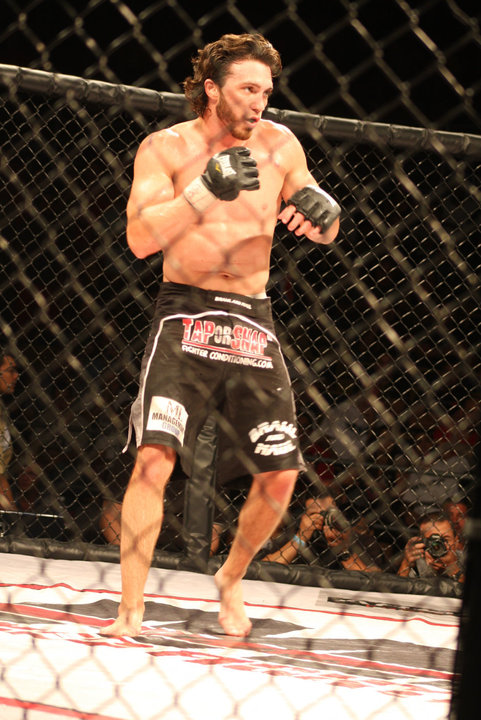
- Rio in 2011
- Born: Michael Alexander Rio; July 6, 1981 (age 45); Miami, Florida, U.S.
- Other names: The Wolverine
- Nationality: American
- Height: 5 ft 10 in (1.78 m)
- Weight: 155 lb (70 kg; 11.1 st)
- Division: Lightweight
- Reach: 71.0 in (180 cm)
- Fighting out of: Miami, Florida, U.S.
- Team: American Top Team Miramar; American Top Team Coconut Creek
- Wrestling: NAIA Wrestling
- Years active: 2008-2014

Mixed martial arts record
- Total: 15
- Wins: 10
- By knockout: 4
- By submission: 5
- By decision: 1
- Losses: 5
- By knockout: 2
- By submission: 2
- By decision: 1

Other information
- University: Lindenwood University; Harper College
- Mixed martial arts record from Sherdog
Medal record
Men's collegiate wrestling
Representing Lindenwood University
NAIA Championships
Gold medal – first place	2005 Sioux City	149 lb
Gold medal – first place	2006 Sioux City	157 lb

Michael Alexander Rio (born July 6, 1981) is an American mixed martial artist who last competed in 2014. A professional since 2008, he has competed for the UFC and was a competitor on the 15th season of The Ultimate Fighter.

== Wrestling career ==
=== High school ===
Rio was introduced to wrestling at Cutler Ridge Middle School, but truly began competing at Miami Southridge High School, where he went on to win two Florida state championships under high school wrestling coach Jim Husk (who also coached his father, uncle, older brother and two younger brothers) and assistant coach Kenny Johnson. During that time he led his school to two undefeated state championship wins, individually amassing an overall record of 147-10, going undefeated his junior and senior years. Along with those honors, he also holds the national record of fastest pin at 4 seconds at 103 lbs. He was also named to the Wrestling USA Magazine's National All-American High School Team as an honorable mention in 2000 and Wrestler of the Year (Mr. Wrestling) by Florida Dairy Farmers, Inc.

It was also in high school that Rio met and began some wrestling training with Cuban world champion and now fellow fighter Alexis Vila.

=== College ===
In his first year at the collegiate level, Rio advanced to the finals of the NJCAA national tournament, but lost. A year later, he once again advanced to the NJCAA nationals and won his first national championship for Harper College at 149 lbs. He then won back-to-back NAIA national wrestling championships for Lindenwood University at 149 and 157 lbs, respectively. He was also the only NAIA wrestler that year to defend his back-to-back title. Rio finished his college career by being named Most Outstanding Wrestler of the 2006 NAIA national championships. It was because of this performance, that he had the honor of being featured in the March 27, 2006, issue of Sports Illustrated magazine's long-running segment Faces in the Crowd.

Additionally, during his time at Lindenwood University he was also the college roommate of now fellow UFC fighter and The Ultimate Fighter 12 winner Jonathan Brookins.

== Mixed martial arts career ==
=== Background ===
While working as a bouncer at a nightclub, Rio was approached by many former wrestlers asking why he did not fight MMA. After first shunning the idea, he finally gave the sport a try. He began his MMA training at Freestyle Fighting Academy (FFA) in Westchester, Florida, under the tutelage of brothers Marcos and David Avellan. Initially thinking this would only be a hobby, it wasn't until the ML Management Group CEO offered her management services that his career really began to take off.

Rio is nicknamed "The Wolverine" after the Marvel Comics character for having a similar look. More specifically, the film version played by Hugh Jackman.

=== Early career and training ===
Rio's first pro fight came in 2008 when he defeated Marc Seno at Reality Combat Championship 2 with a technical knock out by punches. Mike continued on his winning streak besting his next five opponents via submissions and knockouts between 2008 and 2011, with one fight ending in a unanimous decision against Mike Bruno. It was also during that time that Rio briefly fought for the former Miami Heat player Glen Rice's G-Force Fights promotion.

Rio formally trained in Miami at gyms Zen Ju-Jitsu with Coach Enrico Cocco, the Health Joint with Ulises Garcia and Young Tigers with Manuel "Manolo" Lopez and Ultimate Fighter alum Alex Caceres. Rio has also trained at the Jaco Hybrid Training Center in Delray Beach, Florida, best known for their team, the Blackzilians and has traveled to Texas to train with The Ultimate Fighter 16 winner Colton Smith and his boxing coach.

Rio has most recently taken up coaching/training at the American Top Team in Miramar, Florida, and Coconut Creek, Florida.

=== Championship Fighting Alliance ===
Rio made his Championship Fighting Alliance (CFA) debut against opponent and former Ultimate Fighter champion Efraín Escudero, but suffered his first loss via decision against the fighter. Rio rebounded by winning his next two contests, prior to being chosen to participate on The Ultimate Fighter: Live.

=== The Ultimate Fighter ===
Having changed formats and being moved to a different network, The Ultimate Fighter's 15th season debuted live on cable channel FX March 9, 2012 with rivals Dominick Cruz and Urijah Faber coaching the 32 potential candidates vying for a spot in The Ultimate Fighter house. In the preliminary bout to reach the house, Rio faced Northern Irish fighter, Ali Maclean, and won by submission with a rear-naked choke. He was then chosen by current UFC bantamweight champion Cruz along with seven other fighters to represent his "Team Cruz" on the show.

After a visit from Ronda Rousey, weeks of heavy training, enduring a minor knee injury, and a scuffle with teammate Justin Lawrence, Rio's name was finally called to face Faber's British fighter Andy Ogle. The fight was even going into the second round, but Rio fell to Ogle via rear-naked choke.

In the last episode before the season finale, it was revealed by UFC President Dana White that all the contestants in the house would fight in the finale except Ogle and Rio due to injuries. The injury to Rio being two broken ribs he suffered during his fight with Ogle. The injury wasn't immediately noticed after the fight, instead it was discovered in training the following week. That didn't deter White, however as he was so impressed by the caliber of talent on the show that he decided to sign them all to contracts, Rio included.

=== Ultimate Fighting Championship ===
Rio made his official UFC debut when he faced fellow TUF: Live alumnus John Cofer on December 15, 2012, at The Ultimate Fighter: Team Carwin vs. Team Nelson Finale. He won via submission (armbar) in the third round.

Months later, Rio faced and was defeated by Francisco Trinaldo via arm triangle choke on May 18, 2013, at UFC on FX 8.

Rio then faced The Ultimate Fighter 13 winner Tony Ferguson on October 19, 2013 at UFC 166. He lost via D'arce choke submission in the first round.

Finally, Rio faced Daron Cruickshank on January 25, 2014, at UFC on Fox 10. He lost the fight when he was stunned due to a wheel kick and finally TKOed by punches at 4:56 of round two. As a result, Rio was released from the promotion.

=== Fight Time Promotions ===
In late March 2014, Rio signed with Olympic gold medalist boxer Howard Davis Jr.'s Fight Time Promotions. In his first ever main event, he went up against former Bellator fighter Avery McPhatter on May 30 at the War Memorial Auditorium in Fort Lauderdale, Florida. He won in the first round via D'Arce choke. He also won submission of the night.

In his second main event, Rio faced former Bellator fighter Frank Carrillo for the Fight Time Lightweight Championship on August 29, 2014. He lost the fight via second round knockout. Carrillo, however, was ineligible to win the title belt for lack of making weight. Rio still took the fight.

== Acting career ==
The Ultimate Fighter wasn't Rio's first taste of television. In 2011, during the fifth season of Miami-based show Burn Notice (eighth episode entitled "Hard Out"), Rio appeared in several scenes in an uncredited mercenary role, even sharing one scene with show star Jeffrey Donovan.

Rio also appeared in a music video in 2012 entitled "The Crown" by Miami hip-hop, funk and soul fusion band Dangerflow. In the video he plays a man fired from his day job and forced to fight in night street fights to earn money for his fictional daughter. "The Crown" was also the official song of the Miami Heat championship parade that same year.

== Personal life ==
Rio's mother and father are of Cuban descent. His mother being born in Miami, his father emigrating to Miami at the age of five. Rio, also born and raised in Miami, participated in many sports with his older brother, including soccer, basketball, baseball, cross country running and wrestling. After his parents divorced and remarried, his family grew and he soon had many siblings, almost all of which also wrestled. After college, Rio returned home and began volunteering coaching at Christopher Columbus High School, where two of his four younger brothers attended and wrestled. Also during that time he began a career in security as a bouncer in Miami's Coconut Grove and downtown Brickell areas and most currently in Miami's South Beach area.

In April 2015, director/producer Danny Segura put together a short documentary film entitled Scraping for a Dollar in which Rio is followed on his daily routine and his attempt to reenter the UFC.

Rio also is a strong advocate of Autism awareness, having a younger brother with the condition. He often volunteers at schools and conventions and has even created a wristband with his name in which he donates all the proceeds to Autism Speaks. It is because of those efforts that he has become one of the South Florida athletic spokesmen for the organization.

Rio and his family are no strangers to fighting having a grandfather and great uncle, Ricardo Montero Duque (who was a major in the Cuban Army and later the US Army), who fought during the Bay of Pigs Invasion against Fidel Castro's forces and for Cuba's independence in the 1950s and 1960s.

Rio is also the cousin of Gaby Sánchez of the Tohoku Rakuten Golden Eagles of Japan's Nippon Professional Baseball (NPB).

On May 17, 2016, Rio and his fiancée had a child, a boy, his first.

== Championships and accomplishments ==
=== Mixed martial arts ===
- Miami New Times - Best of Miami 2013 - Best MMA Fighter
- 2013 Florida MMA Awards - Florida's Favorite UFC Fighter

=== Amateur wrestling ===
- College
  - NJCAA National Champion, Harper College (2004)
  - Two-time NAIA National Champion, Lindenwood University (2005, 2006)
  - Most Outstanding Wrestler, 2006 NAIA National Tournament
  - Four-time Collegiate Wrestling All-American (2003, 2004, 2005, 2006)
- High School
  - Two-time Florida State Champion, Miami Southridge High School
  - National record for fastest pin at 103 lbs. (Four seconds)
  - Wrestling USA Magazine 2000 National All-American Team, Honorable Mention
  - Florida Dairy Farmers, Inc Wrestler of the Year (Mr. Wrestler)

== Mixed martial arts record ==
Professional record breakdown
15 matches	10 wins	5 losses
By knockout	4	2
By submission	5	2
By decision	1	1

Res.	Record	Opponent	Method	Event	Date	Round	Time	Location	Notes
Loss	10–5	Frank Carrillo	KO (punches)	Fight Time 20	August 29, 2014	2	2:18	Ft. Lauderdale, Florida, United States	For the vacant Fight Time Lightweight Championship.
Win	10–4	Avery McPhatter	Submission (brabo choke)	Fight Time 19: Battle of the Brave	May 30, 2014	1	2:38	Ft. Lauderdale, Florida, United States	
Loss	9–4	Daron Cruickshank	TKO (punches)	UFC on Fox: Henderson vs. Thomson	January 25, 2014	2	4:56	Chicago, Illinois, United States	
Loss	9–3	Tony Ferguson	Submission (brabo choke)	UFC 166	October 19, 2013	1	1:52	Houston, Texas, United States	
Loss	9–2	Francisco Trinaldo	Submission (arm-triangle choke)	UFC on FX: Belfort vs. Rockhold	May 18, 2013	1	3:08	Jaraguá do Sul, Brazil	
Win	9–1	John Cofer	Submission (armbar)	The Ultimate Fighter 16 Finale	December 15, 2012	3	4:11	Las Vegas, Nevada, United States	
Win	8–1	John Ortolani	TKO (punches)	CFA 4: Izquierdo vs. Cenoble	December 17, 2011	1	4:53	Miami, Florida, United States	
Win	7–1	Zach Juusola	TKO (punches)	CFA 3: Howard vs. Olson	October 9, 2011	1	1:01	Miami, Florida, United States	
Loss	6–1	Efraín Escudero	Decision (unanimous)	CFA 2: McCorkle vs. Befort	July 23, 2011	3	5:00	Miami, Florida, United States	
Win	6–0	Sylvain Bynum	TKO (punches)	MFA: New Generation 4	February 11, 2011	1	0:51	Miami, Florida, United States	
Win	5–0	Jimmy Chaikong	Submission (rear-naked choke)	G-Force Fights: Bad Blood 4	November 18, 2010	1	1:38	Miami, Florida, United States	
Win	4–0	Mike Bruno	Decision (unanimous)	MFA: New Generation 3	September 18, 2010	3	5:00	Miami, Florida, United States	
Win	3–0	Carlos Galindo	Submission (choke)	Fite Nite: Terror En La Villa	October 31, 2009	2	0:59	San José, Costa Rica	
Win	2–0	Nathaniel Robinson	Submission (rear-naked choke)	WWCF: Blood War	January 25, 2009	1	2:45	Daytona Beach, Florida, United States	
Win	1–0	Marc Seno	TKO (punches)	Reality Combat Championship 2: The Second Encounter	March 1, 2008	1	3:09	Jacksonville, Florida, United States	

=== Mixed martial arts exhibition record ===
Exhibition record breakdown		
2 matches	1 win	1 loss
By submission	1	1

Res.	Record	Opponent	Method	Event	Date	Round	Time	Location	Notes
Loss	1–1	Andy Ogle	Submission (rear-naked choke)	The Ultimate Fighter: Live	May 4, 2012	2	4:19	Las Vegas, Nevada, United States	Preliminary round.
Win	1–0	Ali Maclean	Submission (rear-naked choke)	The Ultimate Fighter: Live	March 9, 2012	1	3:32	Las Vegas, Nevada, United States	1 round TUF entry fight.

== See also ==
- List of male mixed martial artists
