= Bristol Marunde =

American mixed martial arts fighter and television personality

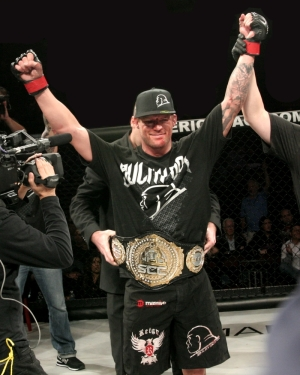
- Born: April 20, 1982 (age 44); Fairbanks, Alaska, United States
- Height: 6 ft 1 in (1.85 m)
- Weight: 170 lb (77 kg; 12 st)
- Division: Light Heavyweight; Middleweight; Welterweight
- Reach: 75.5 in (192 cm)
- Fighting out of: Las Vegas, Nevada, United States
- Team: Syndicate MMA; Extreme Couture; Throwdown Training Center
- Years active: 2005-present

Mixed martial arts record
- Total: 26
- Wins: 16
- By knockout: 3
- By submission: 6
- By decision: 7
- Losses: 10
- By knockout: 5
- By submission: 3
- By decision: 2

Other information
- Mixed martial arts record from Sherdog

Bristol Marunde (born April 20, 1982) is an American mixed martial artist currently competing in the Welterweight division. He was a contestant on The Ultimate Fighter: Team Carwin vs. Team Nelson, and has competed for the UFC, Strikeforce, Titan FC, M-1 Global, and the Seattle Tiger Sharks of the International Fight League.

In April 2017, Marunde premiered as the cohost of the new HGTV show Flip or Flop Vegas.

== Background ==
Bristol Marunde was born in Fairbanks, Alaska, and moved with his family to Sequim, Washington near Seattle at an early age. In Bellevue, Marunde established notoriety when he applied his MMA techniques to apprehend a wanted rapist lurking in his neighbor's house when she arrived home. Marunde and his father ran the criminal down and apprehended him. The criminal was wanted in 5 states for multiple rapes and burglaries. He was convicted and sent to prison. The Bellevue Chief of Police and the mayor presented Marunde with an outstanding citizen award for his actions.

Marunde was encouraged to try MMA by his older brother Jesse Marunde who placed second in the 2005 World's Strongest Man contest in China. Marunde was devastated by his brother's death in 2007 but has continued fighting.

== Mixed martial arts career ==
=== Early career ===
Marunde compiled a 6-1 amateur record before making his professional debut in 2005. After accumulating a 12-6 professional record, he was given an opportunity to compete in Strikeforce.

=== Strikeforce ===
Marunde faced former Strikeforce Middleweight Champion Ronaldo Souza as a late replacement for Derek Brunson at Strikeforce: Tate vs. Rousey. After Souza gained side control Marunde tapped out in the third round due to an arm-triangle choke.

=== The Ultimate Fighter ===
Marunde was selected as a contestant on The Ultimate Fighter: Team Carwin vs. Team Nelson. Marunde faced George Lockhart in the preliminary round. Marunde won by guillotine choke submission in the first round. Marunde was later selected by Shane Carwin as his second pick.

On Episode 4, Marunde was selected to fight veteran Julian Lane. After two close grueling rounds, Marunde won the fight via unanimous decision and moved onto the quarter-final round. Marunde eventually lost by decision to Neil Magny in the quarter-final round.

=== Ultimate Fighting Championship ===
Marunde made his official UFC debut in April 2013 as he faced season 17 alumni Clint Hester on April 13, 2013, at The Ultimate Fighter 17 Finale. He lost the fight via KO in the third round.

In his second fight for the promotion, Marunde faced promotional newcomer Viscardi Andrade in a Welterweight bout on August 3, 2013, at UFC 163. He lost the fight via TKO in the first round. He was subsequently released from the promotion.

=== Post-UFC career ===
Marunde faced Ian Williams for the ROTR Welterweight Championship at Combat MMA Games: Super Brawl 1 on April 6, 2014. He won via submission (kimura) in the first round. Bristol and his wife Aubrey became the host of HGTV's Flip or Flop Vegas with the first episode airing on April 6, 2017.

== Championships and accomplishments ==
- Combat MMA Games
  - ROTR Welterweight Championship (One time, current)
- Superior Cage Combat
  - SCC Middleweight Championship (One time)

== Mixed martial arts record ==
Professional record breakdown
26 matches	16 wins	10 losses
By knockout	3	5
By submission	6	3
By decision	7	2

Res.	Record	Opponent	Method	Event	Date	Round	Time	Location	Notes
Loss	16–10	Gilbert Smith	TKO (broken jaw)	RFA 31: Smith vs. Marunde	October 9, 2015	4	2:03	Las Vegas, Nevada, United States	For the RFA Welterweight Championship.
Win	16–9	Michael Hill	Decision (unanimous)	Xcessive Force FC 6: The Proving Ground	March 20, 2015	3	5:00	Grand Prairie, Alberta, Canada	Catchweight (172 lb) bout.
Win	15–9	Dave Castillo	Decision (unanimous)	Showdown Fights 15: Castillo vs. Marunde	November 21, 2014	3	5:00	Orem, Utah, United States	
Win	14–9	Micah Miller	Decision (unanimous)	Titan FC 29: Ricci vs. Sotiropoulos	August 22, 2014	3	5:00	Fayetteville, North Carolina, United States	
Win	13–9	Ian Williams	Submission (kimura)	Combat Games MMA: Super Brawl 1	April 6, 2014	1	1:29	Snoqualmie, Washington, United States	Won vacant ROTR Welterweight Championship.
Loss	12–9	Viscardi Andrade	TKO (punches)	UFC 163	August 3, 2013	1	1:36	Rio de Janeiro, Brazil	Return to Welterweight.
Loss	12–8	Clint Hester	TKO (elbow)	The Ultimate Fighter 17 Finale	April 13, 2013	3	3:53	Las Vegas, Nevada, United States	
Loss	12–7	Ronaldo Souza	Submission (arm-triangle choke)	Strikeforce: Tate vs. Rousey	March 3, 2012	3	2:43	Columbus, Ohio, United States	
Win	12–6	Jay Silva	Decision (unanimous)	Superior Cage Combat 3	November 4, 2011	5	5:00	Las Vegas, Nevada, United States	Won the vacant Superior Cage Combat Middleweight Championship
Win	11–6	Victor Moreno	Submission (kimura)	Superior Cage Combat 2	August 20, 2011	1	3:07	Las Vegas, Nevada, United States	
Win	10–6	Chuck Grisby	Decision (unanimous)	Superior Cage Combat 1	May 21, 2011	3	5:00	Las Vegas, Nevada, United States	Catchweight (190 lb) bout.
Win	9–6	Shane Primm	Decision (unanimous)	M-1 Selection 2010: The Americas Finals	September 18, 2010	3	5:00	Atlantic City, New Jersey, United States	
Loss	8–6	Jordan Smith	Submission (triangle choke)	Throwdown Showdown 5: Homecoming	November 20, 2009	1	2:52	Orem, Utah, United States	
Win	8–5	Justin Davis	Submission (rear-naked choke)	Rumble on the Ridge 4	August 15, 2009	1	2:19	Snoqualmie, Washington, United States	Return to Middleweight.
Win	7–5	Mychal Clark	Submission (kimura)	Alliance: The Uprising	May 2, 2009	3	4:08	Kent, Washington, United States	
Win	6–5	Kyle Keeney	Decision (unanimous)	Carnage at the Creek 5	March 12, 2009	3	5:00	Shelton, Washington, United States	
Win	5–5	Will Courchaine	Submission (kimura)	CS: Freedom Fights	June 7, 2008	1	4:51	Tacoma, Washington, United States	
Win	4–5	Noah Inhofer	TKO (corner stoppage)	Carnage at the Creek 2	April 5, 2008	2	5:00	Shelton, Washington, United States	Return to Light Heavyweight.
Loss	3–5	Benji Radach	TKO (punches)	IFL: Everett	June 1, 2007	1	1:28	Everett, Washington, United States	
Win	3–4	John Kading	KO (punches)	IFL: Moline	April 7, 2007	1	1:35	Moline, Illinois, United States	
Loss	2–4	Jeremy Williams	Submission (triangle choke)	IFL: Oakland	January 19, 2007	1	1:13	Oakland, California, United States	
Loss	2–3	Matt Horwich	Decision (unanimous)	IFL: Portland	September 9, 2006	3	4:00	Portland, Oregon, United States	Middleweight debut.
Loss	2–2	Horace Spencer	KO (punch)	Pride and Fury IV: Van Arsdale vs. Oliviera	March 24, 2006	1	0:33	Boise, Idaho, United States	Light Heavyweight bout.
Win	2–1	Rich Attonito	TKO (doctor stoppage)	Euphoria: USA vs. Japan	November 5, 2005	3	1:57	Atlantic City, New Jersey, United States	Welterweight debut.
Loss	1–1	Art Santore	Decision (unanimous)	SF 10: Mayhem	May 28, 2005	3	5:00	Portland, Oregon, United States	
Win	1–0	Alexei Veselovzorov	Submission (americana)	Euphoria: USA vs. Russia	May 14, 2005	1	2:00	Atlantic City, New Jersey, United States	

== Mixed martial arts exhibition record ==
Professional record breakdown
3 matches	2 wins	1 loss
By knockout	0	0
By submission	1	0
By decision	1	1

Res.	Record	Opponent	Method	Event	Date	Round	Time	Location	Notes
Loss	2–1	Neil Magny	Decision (unanimous)	The Ultimate Fighter: Team Carwin vs. Team Nelson	September 4, 2012	2	5:00	Las Vegas, Nevada, United States	Quarter-Final round
Win	2–0	Julian Lane	Decision (unanimous)	The Ultimate Fighter: Team Carwin vs. Team Nelson	August 13, 2012	2	5:00	Las Vegas, Nevada, United States	Preliminary round
Win	1–0	George Lockhart	Submission (guillotine choke)	The Ultimate Fighter: Team Carwin vs. Team Nelson	July 31, 2012	1	2:23	Las Vegas, Nevada, United States	Elimination round
