= The Ultimate Fighter: Team Carwin vs. Team Nelson =

UFC mixed martial arts television series and event in 2012

- Genre: Reality, Sports
- Created by: Frank Fertitta III, Lorenzo Fertitta, Dana White
- Starring: Dana White, Shane Carwin, and Roy Nelson
- Country of origin: United States

Production
- Running time: 60 minutes

Original release
- Network: FX
- Release: September 14, 2012

The Ultimate Fighter: Team Carwin vs. Team Nelson is the sixteenth main installment of the Ultimate Fighting Championship (UFC)-produced reality television series The Ultimate Fighter.

This season reverted to the taped format, after The Ultimate Fighter: Live's 12-week live format. The previous season saw the show be revamped. Prior seasons of the show were filmed in six weeks, edited and aired several months after filming was completed, whereas The Ultimate Fighter: Live was being filmed over thirteen weeks, featuring live fights. This season returned the old taped format, but stayed on Friday nights

Abandoning the usual open tryouts for the show, the UFC and FX interviewed candidates directly, with many interviewees being former-tryout participants. On July 12, 2012, Roy Nelson and Shane Carwin were announced as the coaches for the season.

== Cast ==
=== Coaches ===
Team Carwin

- Shane Carwin, head coach
- Trevor Wittman, boxing coach
- Nate Marquardt, jiu Jitsu coach
- Pat Barry, striking coach
- Duane Ludwig, striking coach
- Leister Bowling, wrestling coach
- Loren Landlow, sports performance coach

Team Nelson

- Roy Nelson, head coach
- Nick Diaz
- Nate Diaz
- Jake Shields
- Gilbert Melendez

=== Fighters ===
- Team Carwin
  - Sam Alvey, Bristol Marunde, Mike Ricci, Neil Magny, James Chaney, Eddy Ellis, Igor Araujo, Matt Secor
- Team Nelson
  - Dom Waters, Michael Hill, Cameron Diffley, Colton Smith, Jon Manley, Nic Herron-Webb, Joey Rivera, Julian Lane
- Fighters eliminated during the entry round

Saad Awad, Jesse Barrett, Diego Bautista, Frank Camacho, Jerel Clark, Cortez Coleman, Max Griffin, Zane Kamaka, Leo Kuntz, Ricky Legere Jr., George Lockhart, Lev Magen, David Michaud, Kevin Nowaczyk, Tim Ruberg, Jason South

== Episodes ==
Episode 1: Bring It!

- Dana White welcomed the 32 fighters, consisting of all welterweights, to the show at the Mandalay Bay Events Center in Las Vegas, Nevada. He introduced them to the coaches, heavyweights Shane Carwin and Roy "Big Country" Nelson.
- White dismissed the fighters to pre-fight warm-ups for the elimination round.
- The preliminary fights began:

Dom Waters defeated Kevin Nowaczyk by KO (punches) at 0:32 of the first round.
Michael Hill defeated Lev Magen by KO (punches) at 1:27 of the first round.
Bristol Marunde defeated George Lockhart by submission (guillotine choke) at 2:23 of first round.
Mike Ricci defeated Jason South by TKO (punches) at 1:50 of the first round.
Julian Lane defeated Diego Bautista by unanimous decision after two rounds.
Igor Araujo defeated Cortez Coleman by submission (triangle choke) at 3:16 in the third round.
James Chaney defeated Jerel Clark by submission (triangle choke) at 1:30 of first round.
Cameron Diffley defeated Zane Kamaka by submission (armbar) at 1:37 of first round.
Neil Magny defeated Frank Camacho by unanimous decision after three rounds.
Jon Manley defeated Ricky Legere Jr. by unanimous decision after two rounds.
Colton Smith defeated Jesse Barrett by unanimous decision after two rounds.
Matt Secor defeated Max Griffin by submission (triangle choke) at 2:55 in the third round.
Eddy Ellis defeated David Michaud by submission (arm triangle choke) at 4:29 of the second round.
Joey Rivera defeated Saad Awad by majority decision after two rounds.
Nic Herron-Webb defeated Tim Ruberg by submission (armbar) at 4:17 of the first round.
Sam Alvey defeated Leo Kuntz by KO (punch) at 0:47 of the first round.

- White expressed his displeasure in some of the fights, but congratulated all of the winning fighters on making it onto the show. Carwin and Nelson then picked teams and a coin was flipped (yellow for Carwin, blue for Nelson). Nelson won the coin toss and opted to choose the first fight, so Carwin was allowed to choose the first fighter. The fighters were picked in the following order:

Coach	1st Pick	2nd Pick	3rd Pick	4th Pick	5th Pick	6th Pick	7th Pick	8th Pick
Carwin	Sam Alvey	Bristol Marunde	Mike Ricci	Neil Magny	James Chaney	Eddy Ellis	Igor Araujo	Matt Secor
Nelson	Dom Waters	Michael Hill	Cameron Diffley	Colton Smith	Jon Manley	Nic Herron-Webb	Joey Rivera	Julian Lane

Episode 2: What We Do

- The sixteen victorious fighters moved into the house. Rifts immediately began to form, with Matt Secor and Julian Lane frequently arguing. Later, Lane and Colton Smith pulled a prank on members of Team Carwin.
- Mike Ricci and Michael Hill note that they are the two only Canadian fighters on the show and befriend each other
- Nelson announced that his team would be training once a day – as opposed to the usual format in previous seasons of two-a-day training sessions – which caused frustration amongst his team.
- Nelson matched Diffley, a former TUF coach on TUF 7, against Magny.
- Neil Magny defeated Cameron Diffley via unanimous decision (20–18, 20–18, 20–18) after two rounds.

Episode 3: We Have Control

- Nic Herron-Webb creates more household enemies when he decides that 2:00 am is the perfect time to play pool, whistle and jump rope outside people's bedrooms.
- Julian Lane, Colton Smith and Herron-Webb take Alvey's mattress from his bedroom and float it on the pool outside. After seeing what happened, Alvey just laughed it off.
- Carwin announced the match up of Alvey against Rivera.
- Joey Rivera defeated Sam Alvey by majority decision (19–19, 20–18, 20–18) after two rounds.

Episode 4: Can't Fix Stupid

- Nelson had his team draw straws to determine who would fight next. Whoever drew the short straw would fight next and pick his opponent or pass the straw to a teammate.
- Lane drew the short straw and picked Marunde to fight.
- The fighters and coaches went to a screening of the new MMA based movie, Here Comes the Boom, starring Kevin James.
- Marunde was worried about making weight. He weighed 186 lb at the fight announcement, but was able to drop down to 170 lb at the weigh in. Nelson along with Lane and Joey Rivera questioned the accuracy of those results.
- Bristol Marunde defeated Julian Lane via unanimous decision (20–18, 20–18, 20–18) after two rounds.
- After the fight, Nelson confronted White about the controversy surrounding Marunde's weigh-in, asking if White wanted him to "keep an eye out on the commission" in the future. White stated that the commission's statement of Marunde making weight is true and that Nelson was being stupid.

Episode 5: Unleash the Beast

- Julian Lane was shown crying in the locker room after his loss talking about wanting to make a better life for his family and how he has nothing left for him.
- Carwin asked his team who was ready to fight, (all fighters rose their hands), to determine the next fight match.
- Matt Secor and Lane nearly came to blows after Secor farted and "threw it at Lane."
- This caused Lane to snap, claiming he would risk going home, just to fight Secor, as he had already lost his fight.
- Carwin announced the matchup of Araujo against Herron-Webb.
- UFC veteran and TUF alumni Eliot Marshall became a part of Team Carwin's coaching staff.
- Team Nelson put Mike Ricci's bed on top of the gazebo in the backyard causing a verbal spat between Herron-Webb and Ricci, who was not as patient as Sam Alvey.
- Igor Araujo defeated Nic Herron-Webb via majority decision after two rounds.
- White and the rest of Team Nelson believed that Herron-Webb was screwed out of a third round.

Episode 6: One Mission

- Nelson complained about Nic Herron-Webb's decision loss to Igor Araujo in the previous week.
- Members of Team Nelson ate and threw away the chicken that belonged to Matt Secor and other members of the yellow team. Secor blamed Michael Hill which caused an argument, leading to Hill calling Secor out for the next fight.
- Despite this, Carwin chose Ellis to fight Team Nelson's Smith.
- Carwin brought in UFC veteran Eliot Marshall and Trevor Wittman to help formulate a game plan for the fight against Ellis.
- Colton Smith defeated Eddy Ellis by majority decision (19–18, 19–18, 19–19) after two rounds.
- This was yet another match that White and Team Carwin believed should have gone to a third round.

Episode 7: Summer Camp

- Nelson picked his next fighter by having his team "pick a number."
- Dom Waters won, but did not want to pick an opponent, so he passed control to Hill who picked Secor.
- TUF 1 winner Forrest Griffin came in as a guest coach to show Team Nelson some striking skills.
- Michael Hill defeated Matt Secor by split decision after three rounds.
- White complained about the judging once again, as the third round was deemed by those in attendance to be highly controversial.

Episode 8: Rock 'Em, Sock 'Em

- White visited the house to try to inspire the fighters after a few lackluster bouts leading to poor judges' decisions.
- Michael Hill got drunk and challenged Neil Magny to a fight in the quarter-finals.
- Julian Lane, in a drunken rage, then began challenging Dom Waters to a fight by continuing to plea "let me bang, bro," to Hill. Despite Hill's assurance that "[he] will let [him] bang," the fight never materialized and Lane ultimately cried.
- Mike Ricci stated that people like Lane make him not want to be associated with the sport.
- The Coaches' Challenge took place with Nelson and Carwin competing in Olympic sports such as javelin, discus and shot put. The winners of each of the 5 sports they took place in gained a 3m advantage in the decisive 400m race. Carwin easily got all of the mile advantages, before winning the race and the $20,000 reward.
- Jon Manley defeated James Chaney via submission (guillotine choke) at 3:25 of the first round.
- The fight was also controversial in that Chaney later admitted that he bit Manley in an attempt to escape from the submission attempt.

Episode 9

- The last match was automatically set up with Ricci matched against Waters.
- Julian Lane throws another fit in the house when he and Colton Smith discuss what they have done in their lives.
- Mike Ricci defeated Dom Waters via unanimous decision after three rounds.

Episode 10

- Michael Hill gets mad at Mike Ricci, as they are the two Canadians on the show, for betraying their friendship by requesting to fight him which they had previously agreed to in the finals only, and a rift forms between the two.
- At the weigh-in, there is a verbal spat between Araujo and Smith after the BJJ blackbelt shoves the Army Ranger. Smith calls Araujo a motherfucker, enraging the Brazilian and his teammates come and restrain him.
- Neil Magny defeated Bristol Marunde via unanimous decision (20–18, 20–18, 20–18).
- Colton Smith defeated Igor Araujo via unanimous decision (20–18, 20–18, 20–18).

Episode 11

- Jon Manley defeated Joey Rivera via majority decision (19–19, 20–18, 20–18).
- Mike Ricci defeated Michael Hill via unanimous decision (20–18, 20–18, 20–18).

Episode 12

- Colton Smith defeated Jon Manley via unanimous decision.
- Mike Ricci defeated Neil Magny via KO (elbow) in the first round.
- The finalists are announced to be Smith and Ricci.

== Tournament Bracket ==
Elimination Round
Joey Rivera	MD
Sam Alvey	2
Jon Manley	SUB
James Chaney	1
Nic Herron-Webb	2
Igor Araujo	MD
Colton Smith	MD
Eddy Ellis	2
Dom Waters	3
Mike Ricci	UD
Michael Hill	SD
Matt Secor	3
Julian Lane	2
Bristol Marunde	UD
Cameron Diffley	2
Neil Magny	UD

Quarter-finals
Joey Rivera	2
Jon Manley	MD
Igor Araujo	2
Colton Smith	UD
Mike Ricci	UD
Michael Hill	2
Bristol Marunde	2
Neil Magny	UD

Semi-finals
Jon Manley	3
Colton Smith	UD
Mike Ricci	KO
Neil Magny	1

Finale
Colton Smith	UD
Mike Ricci	3

Legend
	Team Carwin
	Team Nelson
UD	Unanimous Decision
MD	Majority Decision
SD	Split Decision
SUB	Submission
KO	Knockout

Fighters were awarded $25,000 bonuses. Fans chose the winners of the season bonuses.

- Fight of the Season: Colton Smith vs. Eddy Ellis
- Knockout of the Season: Mike Ricci
- Submission of the Season: Jon Manley

== The Ultimate Fighter 16 Finale ==
The Ultimate Fighter: Team Carwin vs. Team Nelson Finale
- The poster for The Ultimate Fighter: Team Carwin vs. Team Nelson Finale
- Promotion: Ultimate Fighting Championship
- Date: December 15, 2012
- Venue: Hard Rock Hotel and Casino
- City: Las Vegas, Nevada
- Attendance: 2,427
- Total gate: $569,075

Event chronology
UFC on FX: Sotiropoulos vs. Pearson	The Ultimate Fighter: Team Carwin vs. Team Nelson Finale	UFC 155: dos Santos vs. Velasquez 2

The Ultimate Fighter: Team Carwin vs. Team Nelson Finale (also known as The Ultimate Fighter 16 Finale) was a mixed martial arts event held by the Ultimate Fighting Championship. It took place on December 15, 2012, at the Hard Rock Hotel and Casino in Las Vegas, Nevada.

=== Background ===
Shane Carwin was expected to face Roy Nelson in the event's headliner. However, Carwin suffered a knee injury and was replaced by Matt Mitrione.

A bout between Melvin Guillard and Jamie Varner was previously linked to this card. But due to an illness, Varner had to be removed from the card thus scrapping the fight, and rebooking to UFC 155.

=== Results ===
Main card (FX)
Weight class				Method	Round	Time	Notes
Heavyweight	Roy Nelson	def.	Matt Mitrione	TKO (punches)	1	2:58
Welterweight	Colton Smith	def.	Mike Ricci	Decision (unanimous) (30–27, 30–27, 30–26)	3	5:00	(Note: TUF: 16 Welterweight Final.)
Heavyweight	Pat Barry	def.	Shane del Rosario	KO (punches)	2	0:26
Featherweight	Dustin Poirier	def.	Jonathan Brookins	Submission (D'Arce choke)	1	4:15
Preliminary card (Fuel TV)
Welterweight	Mike Pyle	def.	James Head	TKO (knee and punches)	1	1:55	(Note: This bout aired on the broadcast following the Barry vs del Rosario bout.)
Bantamweight	Johnny Bedford	def.	Marcos Vinicius	KO (punches)	2	1:00
Lightweight	Rustam Khabilov	def.	Vinc Pichel	KO (suplex and punches)	1	2:15	(Note: This bout aired on the broadcast following the Poirier vs Brookins bout.)
Welterweight	TJ Waldburger	def.	Nick Catone	Technical Submission (triangle choke)	2	1:04
Preliminary Card (Facebook)
Bantamweight	Hugo Viana	def.	Reuben Duran	KO (punch)	1	4:05
Lightweight	Mike Rio	def.	John Cofer	Submission (armbar)	3	4:11
Flyweight	Tim Elliott	def.	Jared Papazian	Decision (unanimous) (30–25, 30–25, 30–26)	3	5:00	(Note: Papazian had 1 point deducted in round 1 for an illegal knee to a downed opponent.)

=== Bonus Awards ===
The following fighters received $40,000 bonuses.

- Fight of the Night: Tim Elliott vs. Jared Papazian
- Knockout of the Night: Pat Barry
- Submission of the Night: TJ Waldburger

=== Reported payout ===
The following is the reported payout to the fighters as reported to the Nevada State Athletic Commission. It does not include sponsor money and also does not include the UFC's traditional "fight night" bonuses.

- Roy Nelson: $48,000 (includes $24,000 win bonus) def. Matt Mitrione: $12,000
- Colton Smith: $16,000 (includes $8,000 win bonus) def. Mike Ricci: $8,000
- Pat Barry: $44,000 (includes $22,000 win bonus) def. Shane Del Rosario: $20,000
- Dustin Poirier: $34,000 (includes $17,000 win bonus) def. Jonathan Brookins: $20,000
- Mike Pyle: $78,000 (includes $39,000 win bonus) def. James Head: $12,000
- Johnny Bedford: $16,000 (includes $8,000 win bonus) def. Marcos Vinicius: $8,000
- Rustam Khabilov: $16,000 (includes $8,000 win bonus) def. Vinc Pichel: $8,000
- Anthony Waldburger: $28,000 (includes $14,000 win bonus) def. Nick Catone: $13,000
- Hugo Viana: $16,000 (includes $8,000 win bonus) def. Reuben Duran: $8,000
- Mike Rio: $16,000 (includes $8,000 win bonus) def. John Cofer: $8,000
- Tim Elliott: $12,000 (includes $6,000 win bonus) def. Jared Papazian: $6,000

== See also ==
- The Ultimate Fighter
- List of current UFC fighters
- List of UFC events
- 2012 in UFC
