= Rustam Khabilov =

Russian mixed martial arts fighter

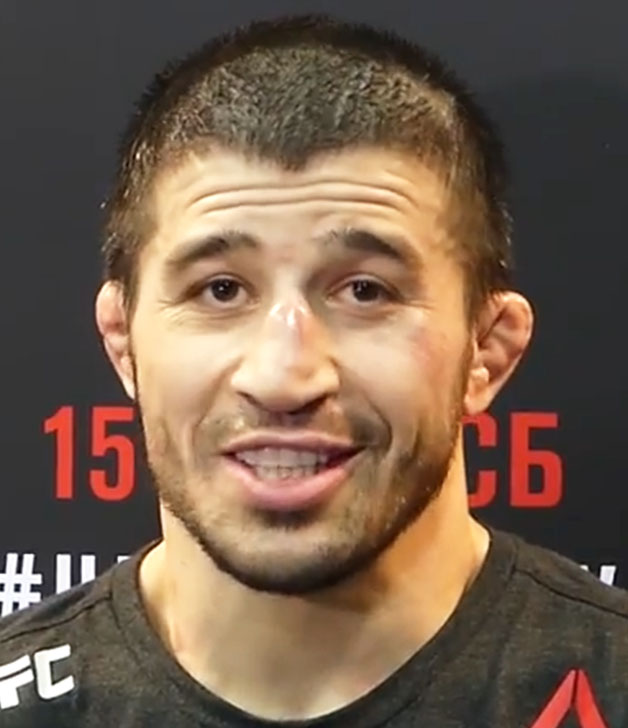
- Rustam Khabilov in 2018
- Born: Хаби́лов Руста́м; 4 November 1986 (age 39); Goksuv-otar, Khasavyurtovsky District, Dagestan ASSR, Russian SFSR, Soviet Union
- Other names: Zangief
- Nationality: Russian
- Height: 1.72 m (5 ft 8 in)
- Weight: 77 kg (170 lb; 12 st 2 lb)
- Division: Lightweight (2012–2018); Welterweight (2007–2010, 2012, 2019–present); Middleweight (2010–2011)
- Reach: 185 cm (73 in)
- Style: Combat Sambo
- Fighting out of: Derbent, Dagestan, Russia
- Team: Champion MMA; Jackson Wink MMA Academy; Armor Functional Training Center
- Rank: International Master of Sport in Combat Sambo
- Years active: 2007–present

Mixed martial arts record
- Total: 28
- Wins: 24
- By knockout: 4
- By submission: 5
- By decision: 15
- Losses: 4
- By submission: 1
- By decision: 3

Other information
- Mixed martial arts record from Sherdog

Rustam Mikailovich Khabilov (born 4 November 1986) is a Russian mixed martial artist, who last competed in the Welterweight division. He is a Combat Sambo World Champion and a former member of the Legion Sport Club fight team in Rostov-on-Don. Prior to signing with Bellator, Khabilov previously fought in the Lightweight division of the Ultimate Fighting Championship (UFC).

== Background ==
Rustam was born in Goksu-otar village in Dagestan, to a Kumyk family. He studied at the Makhachkala Automobile College, where his sports career began. He started his training under Abdulmanap Nurmagomedov, soon becoming world champion in sambo. He is married, and he has two sons and a daughter.

== Mixed martial arts career ==
=== ONE Fighting Championship ===
In January 2012 it was announced that Khabilov had signed with ONE Fighting Championship. He made his debut at ONE Fighting Championship: Battle of Heroes at The BritAma Arena in Jakarta, Indonesia on 11 February 2012 against BJJ World Champion Rodrigo Ribeiro. He won the fight via unanimous decision.

=== Ultimate Fighting Championship ===
Khabilov signed a four-fight deal with the UFC in July 2012.

In his debut, Khabilov faced Vinc Pichel on 15 December 2012 at The Ultimate Fighter: Team Carwin vs. Team Nelson Finale. He won the fight in the first round by hurting Pincel with a suplex and finishing him off with punches on the ground.

For his second fight in the organization, Khabilov faced UFC newcomer and Strikeforce veteran Yancy Medeiros at UFC 159 on 27 April 2013. The fight ended in unusual fashion as Medeiros dislocated his thumb during a takedown by Khabilov early in the first round, resulting in a TKO victory for Khabilov as Medeiros was unable to continue.

For his third UFC fight, Khabilov faced Jorge Masvidal on 6 November 2013 at UFC: Fight for the Troops 3. He won the back-and-forth bout via unanimous decision. The fight also garnered Khabilov his first Fight of the Night bonus award.

Khabilov was expected to face Rafael dos Anjos on 22 February 2014 at UFC 170. However, the bout was cancelled in the weeks leading up to the event due to an injury suffered by Khabilov.

Khabilov faced Benson Henderson on 7 June 2014 in the main event at UFC Fight Night: Henderson vs. Khabilov. He lost the fight via rear-naked choke submission in the fourth round.

Khabilov was expected to face Danny Castillo on 3 January 2015 at UFC 182. However, Khabilov pulled out of the bout due to alleged visa issues.

Khabilov faced Adriano Martins on 22 February 2015 at UFC Fight Night 61. He lost the fight via split decision.

A rescheduled bout with Danny Castillo was expected to take place on 25 July 2015 at UFC on Fox 16. However, for a second time, Khabilov was removed from the pairing due to alleged visa issues. Castillo faced Jim Miller at the event.

Khabilov faced Norman Parke on 27 February 2016 at UFC Fight Night 84. He won the fight via unanimous decision.

Khabilov was tabbed as an injury replacement for Rashid Magomedov to face Chris Wade on 8 May 2016 at UFC Fight Night 87. He won the fight via unanimous decision.

Khabilov was expected to face Reza Madadi on 3 September 2016 at UFC Fight Night 93. However, on 25 July, Madadi pulled out due to undisclosed reasons and was replaced by Leandro Silva. Khabilov won the fight via unanimous decision.

Khabilov next faced Jason Saggo on 10 December 2016 at UFC 206. He won the one-sided fight via unanimous decision.

Khabilov faced Desmond Green on 2 September 2017 at UFC Fight Night 115. He won the fight via unanimous decision.

Khabilov was supposed to face Kajan Johnson on 17 March 2018 at UFC Fight Night 127. However, Khabilov pulled out due to injury and was replaced by Stevie Ray.

The bout with Johnson was rescheduled and eventually took place on 15 September 2018 at UFC Fight Night 136. Khabilov won the back-and-forth fight by split decision.

Khabilov faced Carlos Diego Ferreira on 23 February 2019 at UFC Fight Night 145. He lost the fight by unanimous decision.

Khabilov faced Sergey Khandozhko in a welterweight bout on 9 November 2019 at UFC Fight Night 163. He won the fight via unanimous decision and became a free agent after the fight.

=== Bellator MMA ===
On 2 October 2020, it was reported that Khabilov had signed a multi-fight deal with Bellator MMA.

Rustam was expected to make his Bellator debut against Andrey Koreshkov on 23 October 2021 at Bellator 269. However the bout was scrapped after Khabilov came down with a sickness.

Khabilov was scheduled make his Bellator debut against Lewis Long on September 23, 2022, at Bellator 285. However, Long pulled out of the bout and a replacement opponent was not found.

Khabilov was scheduled to face Jaleel Willis on March 31, 2023 at Bellator 293. However on the day of weigh-ins, Khabilov pulled out of the bout due to undisclosed reasons.

== Personal life ==
Rustam has a wife and is a devout Sunni Muslim. He trained under Khabib Nurmagomedov's father Abdulmanap Nurmagomedov (sambo/MMA), Anvar Magomedgadzhiev, Abdusalam Gadisov and Akhmed Gadzhimagomedov (wrestling), Mike Winkeljohn (boxing), Greg Jackson (MMA).

== Championships and accomplishments ==
=== Sambo ===
- World Combat Sambo Federation (WCSF)
  - Combat Sambo World Lightweight Champion (2007).
- Federation International Amateur de Sambo
  - Combat Sambo Russian National Middleweight Champion.
  - Combat Sambo Republic of Dagestan Middleweight Champion (4 Time).

=== Pankration ===
- Russian Pankration Federation
  - Pankration Middleweight World Champion
  - Moscow Middleweight Pankration Open 2010

=== Combat Jiu Jitsu ===
- Combat Jiu Jitsu Kyiv Cup Light-Heavyweight Champion

=== Mixed martial arts ===
- M-1 Global
  - M-1 Challenge 2009 Championship.
- Ultimate Fighting Championship
  - Fight of the Night (One time)
  - UFC.com Awards
    - 2012: Ranked #10 Newcomer of the Year & Ranked #10 Knockout of the Year vs. Vinc Pichel
- SporTV.com
  - 2012 Knockout of the year (2nd) vs. Vinc Pichel on 15 December 2012.
- UFC Ultimate Insider
  - UFC Debuts of All-Time (8th) vs. Vinc Pichel on 15 December 2012.
- MMAJunkie.com
  - 2018 Robbery of the Year vs. Kajan Johnson

== Mixed martial arts record ==
Professional record breakdown
| 28 matches | 24 wins | 4 losses |
| By knockout | 4 | 0 |
| By submission | 5 | 1 |
| By decision | 15 | 3 |

| Res. | Record | Opponent | Method | Event | Date | Round | Time | Location | Notes |
|---|---|---|---|---|---|---|---|---|---|
| Win | 24–4 | Sergey Khandozhko | Decision (unanimous) | UFC Fight Night: Magomedsharipov vs. Kattar | 9 November 2019 | 3 | 5:00 | Moscow, Russia | Return to Welterweight. |
| Loss | 23–4 | Carlos Diego Ferreira | Decision (unanimous) | UFC Fight Night: Błachowicz vs. Santos | 23 February 2019 | 3 | 5:00 | Prague, Czech Republic | Catchweight (157 lb) bout; Ferreira missed weight. |
| Win | 23–3 | Kajan Johnson | Decision (split) | UFC Fight Night: Hunt vs. Oleinik | 15 September 2018 | 3 | 5:00 | Moscow, Russia | |
| Win | 22–3 | Desmond Green | Decision (unanimous) | UFC Fight Night: Volkov vs. Struve | 2 September 2017 | 3 | 5:00 | Rotterdam, Netherlands | |
| Win | 21–3 | Jason Saggo | Decision (unanimous) | UFC 206 | 10 December 2016 | 3 | 5:00 | Toronto, Ontario, Canada | Catchweight (158 lb) bout; Khabilov missed weight. |
| Win | 20–3 | Leandro Silva | Decision (unanimous) | UFC Fight Night: Arlovski vs. Barnett | 3 September 2016 | 3 | 5:00 | Hamburg, Germany | |
| Win | 19–3 | Chris Wade | Decision (unanimous) | UFC Fight Night: Overeem vs. Arlovski | 8 May 2016 | 3 | 5:00 | Rotterdam, Netherlands | |
| Win | 18–3 | Norman Parke | Decision (unanimous) | UFC Fight Night: Silva vs. Bisping | 27 February 2016 | 3 | 5:00 | London, England | |
| Loss | 17–3 | Adriano Martins | Decision (split) | UFC Fight Night: Bigfoot vs. Mir | 22 February 2015 | 3 | 5:00 | Porto Alegre, Brazil | |
| Loss | 17–2 | Benson Henderson | Submission (rear-naked choke) | UFC Fight Night: Henderson vs. Khabilov | 7 June 2014 | 4 | 1:16 | Albuquerque, New Mexico, United States | |
| Win | 17–1 | Jorge Masvidal | Decision (unanimous) | UFC: Fight for the Troops 3 | 6 November 2013 | 3 | 5:00 | Fort Campbell, Kentucky, United States | Fight of the Night. |
| Win | 16–1 | Yancy Medeiros | TKO (thumb injury) | UFC 159 | 27 April 2013 | 1 | 2:32 | Newark, New Jersey, United States | |
| Win | 15–1 | Vinc Pichel | KO (suplex and punches) | The Ultimate Fighter: Team Carwin vs. Team Nelson Finale | 15 December 2012 | 1 | 2:15 | Las Vegas, Nevada, United States | Lightweight debut. |
| Win | 14–1 | Jason Dent | Decision (unanimous) | Pure MMA: Next Episode | 12 May 2012 | 3 | 5:00 | Wilkes-Barre, Pennsylvania, United States | Catchweight (160 lb) bout. |
| Win | 13–1 | Rodrigo Ribeiro | Decision (unanimous) | ONE FC: Battle of Heroes | 11 February 2012 | 3 | 5:00 | Jakarta, Indonesia | |
| Win | 12–1 | Nazir Kadyzhev | TKO (punches) | ProFC Grand Prix Global: Caucasus | 26 September 2011 | 1 | 4:58 | Derbent, Russia | Return to Welterweight. |
| Loss | 11–1 | Ruslan Khaskhanov | Decision (split) | M-1 Selection Ukraine 2010: The Finals | 12 February 2011 | 3 | 5:00 | Kyiv, Ukraine | |
| Win | 11–0 | Sergei Utochkin | Submission (armbar) | M-1 Selection Ukraine 2010: Round 6 | 6 November 2010 | 1 | 1:28 | Kyiv, Ukraine | |
| Win | 10–0 | Gleb Morozov | Submission (armbar) | M-1 Selection Ukraine 2010: Clash of the Titans | 18 September 2010 | 1 | 4:46 | Kyiv, Ukraine | |
| Win | 9–0 | Andrei Balakhonov | Submission (armbar) | M-1 Selection Ukraine 2010: Round 2 | 7 May 2010 | 1 | 1:34 | Kyiv, Ukraine | Middleweight debut. |
| Win | 8–0 | Said Khalilov | Decision (unanimous) | M-1 Challenge: 2009 Selections 8 | 4 October 2009 | 3 | 5:00 | Moscow, Russia | |
| Win | 7–0 | Gasanali Gasanaliev | Decision (split) | M-1 Challenge: 2009 Selections 6 | 5 September 2009 | 3 | 5:00 | Makhachkala, Russia | |
| Win | 6–0 | Akin Duran | KO (slam) | M-1 Challenge 18: Netherlands Day Two | 16 August 2009 | 1 | 0:28 | Hilversum, Netherlands | |
| Win | 5–0 | Vener Galiev | Decision (split) | M-1 Challenge: 2009 Selections 4 | 24 June 2009 | 3 | 5:00 | St. Petersburg, Russia | |
| Win | 4–0 | Vladimir Papusha | Submission (armbar) | M-1 Challenge: 2009 Selections 2 | 19 April 2009 | 1 | 2:04 | St. Petersburg, Russia | |
| Win | 3–0 | Hamiz Mamedov | Decision (unanimous) | CSFU: Champions League | 13 September 2008 | 3 | 5:00 | Poltava, Ukraine | |
| Win | 2–0 | Karen Grigoryan | Decision (unanimous) | CFF: International MMA Tournament | 9 December 2007 | 3 | 5:00 | Tyumen, Russia | |
| Win | 1–0 | Bagautdin Abasov | Submission (triangle choke) | Tsumada Fighting Championship 1 | 3 August 2007 | 2 | 2:14 | Tsumadinsky, Russia | |

== See also ==
- List of male mixed martial artists
