= UFC Fight Night: Rockhold vs. Philippou =

UFC mixed martial arts event in 2014

- The poster for UFC Fight Night: Rockhold vs. Philippou
- Promotion: Ultimate Fighting Championship
- Date: January 15, 2014
- Venue: The Arena at Gwinnett Center
- City: Duluth, Georgia
- Attendance: 5,822
- Total gate: $231,951

Event chronology
UFC Fight Night: Saffiedine vs. Lim	UFC Fight Night: Rockhold vs. Philippou	UFC on Fox: Henderson vs. Thomson

UFC Fight Night: Rockhold vs. Philippou (also known as UFC Fight Night 35) was a mixed martial arts event held on January 15, 2014, at The Arena at Gwinnett Center in Duluth, Georgia. The event was broadcast live on Fox Sports 1, and was a live lead in to the pilot episode of The Ultimate Fighter Nations: Canada vs. Australia.

== Background ==
The event was headlined by a middleweight bout between Luke Rockhold and Costas Philippou.

Thiago Silva was briefly linked to a bout with Ovince St. Preux at the event. However, Silva was quickly removed from the bout for an undisclosed injury. The bout was rescheduled and was expected to take place on March 15, 2014, at UFC 171, before being cancelled entirely after Silva was arrested and released from the UFC.

Jason High was expected to face Adlan Amagov at the event. However, Amagov was forced out of the bout due to injury and was replaced by promotional newcomer Beneil Dariush. In turn, High was forced out of the bout with appendicitis and was replaced by returning veteran Charlie Brenneman.

== Results ==
Main Card (Fox Sports 1)
Weight class				Method	Round	Time	Notes
Middleweight	Luke Rockhold	def.	Costas Philippou	TKO (body kick)	1	2:31
Middleweight	Brad Tavares	def.	Lorenz Larkin	Decision (unanimous) (29–28, 29–28, 29–28)	3	5:00
Bantamweight	T.J. Dillashaw	def.	Mike Easton	Decision (unanimous) (30–27, 30–27, 30–27)	3	5:00
Middleweight	Yoel Romero	def.	Derek Brunson	TKO (punches and elbows)	3	3:23
Flyweight	John Moraga	def.	Dustin Ortiz	Decision (split) (28–29, 29–28, 29–28)	3	5:00
Featherweight	Cole Miller	def.	Sam Sicilia	Submission (rear-naked choke)	2	1:54
Preliminary card (Fox Sports 1)
Lightweight	Ramsey Nijem	def.	Justin Edwards	Decision (unanimous) (30–27, 29–28, 29–28)	3	5:00
Lightweight	Elias Silvério	def.	Isaac Vallie-Flagg	Decision (unanimous) (29–27, 29–27, 29–27)	3	5:00	(Note: Silvério had 1 point deducted in round 2 due to an illegal knee to a downed opponent.)
Middleweight	Trevor Smith	def.	Brian Houston	Decision (split) (28–29, 29–28, 29–28)	3	5:00
Flyweight	Louis Smolka	def.	Alptekin Özkılıç	Decision (unanimous) (29–28, 29–28, 29–28)	3	5:00
Preliminary card (UFC Fight Pass)
Lightweight	Vinc Pichel	def.	Garett Whiteley	Decision (unanimous) (30–27, 30–27, 30–27)	3	5:00
Lightweight	Beneil Dariush	def.	Charlie Brenneman	Submission (rear-naked choke)	1	1:45

== Bonus awards ==
The following fighters received $50,000 bonuses.

- Fight of The Night: Yoel Romero vs. Derek Brunson
- Knockout of The Night: Luke Rockhold
- Submission of the Night: Cole Miller

== Reported payout ==
The following is the reported payout to the fighters as reported to the Georgia Athletic and Entertainment Commission. It does not include sponsor money and also does not include the UFC's traditional "fight night" bonuses.

- Luke Rockhold: $80,000 (includes $40,000 win bonus) def. Costas Philippou: $23,000
- Brad Tavares: $32,000 (includes $16,000 win bonus) def. Lorenz Larkin: $26,000
- T.J. Dillashaw: $28,000 (includes $14,000 win bonus) def. Mike Easton: $14,000
- Yoel Romero: $28,000 (includes $14,000 win bonus) def. Derek Brunson: $19,000
- John Moraga: $34,000 (includes $17,000 win bonus) def. Dustin Ortiz: $10,000
- Cole Miller: $56,000 (includes $28,000 win bonus) def. Sam Sicilia: $10,000
- Ramsey Nijem: $28,000 (includes $14,000 win bonus) def. Justin Edwards: $10,000
- Elias Silverio: $10,000 (includes $10,000 win bonus) def. Isaac Vallie-Flagg: $12,000
- Trevor Smith: $16,000 (includes $8,000 win bonus) def. Brian Houston: $8,000
- Louis Smolka: $16,000 (includes $8,000 win bonus) def. Alptekin Özkılıç: $10,000
- Vinc Pichel: $16,000 (includes $8,000 win bonus) def. Garrett Whiteley: $8,000
- Beniel Dariush: $16,000 (includes $8,000 win bonus) def. Charlie Brenneman: $10,000

== See also ==
- List of UFC events
- 2014 in UFC
