= UFC: Fight for the Troops 3 =

UFC mixed martial arts event in 2013

- The poster for UFC: Fight for the Troops 3
- Promotion: Ultimate Fighting Championship
- Date: November 6, 2013
- Venue: Fort Campbell
- City: Fort Campbell, Kentucky

Event chronology
| UFC Fight Night: Machida vs. Muñoz | UFC: Fight for the Troops 3 | UFC Fight Night: Belfort vs. Henderson 2 |

UFC: Fight for the Troops 3 (also known as UFC Fight Night 31) was a mixed martial arts event held on November 6, 2013, at Fort Campbell in Fort Campbell, Kentucky. The event was broadcast live on Fox Sports 1.

== Background ==
The event was the fourth that UFC hosted in cooperation with a US military base, following UFC Fight Night: Sanchez vs. Riggs in 2006, UFC: Fight for the Troops in 2008 and UFC: Fight for the Troops 2 in 2011. Featured on the card were several United States Armed Forces military veterans including Tim Kennedy, Liz Carmouche, Colton Smith and Neil Magny.

A bout between George Roop and Francisco Rivera, previously linked to UFC 166 was moved to this event to bolster the card.

Nik Lentz was briefly scheduled to face Dennis Bermudez at the event. However, Lentz was pulled from the pairing with Bermudez in favor of a bout with Chad Mendes on December 14, 2013, at UFC on Fox 9. Bermudez then faced Steven Siler.

Derek Brunson was originally scheduled to face Antônio Braga Neto on this card. However, Neto withdrew due to an injury and was replaced by UFC newcomer Brian Houston.

Tim Kennedy was expected to face Lyoto Machida in the event headliner. However, Machida was pulled from the bout in favor of a matchup with Mark Muñoz on October 26, 2013, at UFC Fight Night 30, after Muñoz's original opponent, Michael Bisping was forced out of their bout with an injury. Kennedy instead faced Rafael Natal in the event headliner.

== Results ==
Main Card (Fox Sports 1)
| Weight class | | | | Method | Round | Time | Notes |
|---|---|---|---|---|---|---|---|
| Middleweight | Tim Kennedy | def. | Rafael Natal | KO (punches) | 1 | 4:40 |
| Women's Bantamweight | Alexis Davis | def. | Liz Carmouche | Decision (unanimous) (30–27, 30–27, 29–28) | 3 | 5:00 |
| Middleweight | Yoel Romero | def. | Ronny Markes | KO (punches) | 3 | 1:39 |
| Lightweight | Rustam Khabilov | def. | Jorge Masvidal | Decision (unanimous) (30–27, 29–28, 30–27) | 3 | 5:00 |
| Lightweight | Michael Chiesa | def. | Colton Smith | Submission (rear-naked choke) | 2 | 1:41 |
Preliminary card (Fox Sports 1)
| Lightweight | Bobby Green | def. | James Krause | TKO (body kick) | 1 | 3:50 | (Note: Green had 1 point deducted in round 1 due to two accidental kicks to the groin.) |
| Bantamweight | Francisco Rivera | def. | George Roop | TKO (punches) | 2 | 2:20 |
| Featherweight | Dennis Bermudez | def. | Steven Siler | Decision (unanimous) (30–27, 30–27, 30–27) | 3 | 5:00 |
| Women's Bantamweight | Amanda Nunes | def. | Germaine de Randamie | TKO (elbows) | 1 | 3:56 |
Preliminary card (Online Prelims)
| Middleweight | Lorenz Larkin | def. | Chris Camozzi | Decision (unanimous) (30–27, 30–27, 29–28) | 3 | 5:00 |
| Lightweight | Yancy Medeiros | vs. | Yves Edwards | No Contest (overturned) | 1 | 2:47 | (Note: Originally ruled a KO victory (punches) at 2:47 of round 1 for Medeiros; result changed to "No Contest" after Medeiros tested positive for marijuana during post fight drug screening. This bout aired on the broadcast following the Davis vs Carmouche bout.) |
| Welterweight | Seth Baczynski | def. | Neil Magny | Decision (unanimous) (29–28, 29–28, 29–28) | 3 | 5:00 |
| Middleweight | Derek Brunson | def. | Brian Houston | Submission (rear-naked choke) | 1 | 0:48 |

== Bonus awards ==
The following fighters received $50,000 bonuses.

- Fight of the Night: Rustam Khabilov vs. Jorge Masvidal
- Knockout of the Night: Tim Kennedy
- Submission of the Night: Michael Chiesa

== See also ==
- List of UFC events
- 2013 in UFC
