= Carlos Diego Ferreira =

Brazilian mixed martial artist

- Born: Carlos Diego Ferreira Neves; January 18, 1985 (age 41); Careiro da Várzea, Amazonas, Brazil
- Height: 5 ft 9 in (1.75 m)
- Weight: 155 lb (70 kg; 11.1 st)
- Division: Lightweight (2012–present); Welterweight (2012); Middleweight (2011)
- Reach: 74 in (188 cm)
- Style: Brazilian Jiu Jitsu
- Fighting out of: Pharr, Texas, U.S.
- Team: Team Ferreira (2010–present); Atos Jiu-Jitsu; Fortis MMA (2015–present)
- Rank: 3rd degree black belt in Brazilian Jiu-Jitsu
- Years active: 2011–present

Mixed martial arts record
- Total: 27
- Wins: 20
- By knockout: 5
- By submission: 7
- By decision: 8
- Losses: 7
- By knockout: 4
- By decision: 3

Other information
- Mixed martial arts record from Sherdog

Carlos Diego Ferreira
Medal record

Representing Brazil

Brazilian Jiu-Jitsu

Nogi World Jiu-Jitsu Championship
Bronze medal – third place	2008 California, USA	-79.5 kg
Silver medal – second place	2009 California, USA	-79.5 kg

Brazilian Jiu-Jitsu

Pan American Jiu-Jitsu Championship
Bronze medal – third place	2009 California, USA	-82 kg

Carlos Diego Ferreira Neves (born January 18, 1985) is a Brazilian mixed martial artist, currently competing in the Lightweight division of the Ultimate Fighting Championship. He is the former Legacy FC lightweight champion, and vacated the championship in May 2014 to sign with the UFC.

== Background ==
Born in Careiro da Várzea, Amazonas, Brazil, Ferreira grew up playing soccer, and his first martial art was capoeira. At the age of 10 Ferreira started training Brazilian jiu-jitsu. He moved to the United States in 2008 to make a career out of jiu-jitsu like his idol Ronaldo Souza.

== Mixed martial arts career ==
Despite faring fairly well in jiu-jitsu competition, he never captured gold in big tournaments and was forced to start teaching the sport to make a living. Subsequently Ferreira made his professional mixed martial arts debut on April 15, 2011, when he faced Joseph Daily at STFC 15. He won the fight via a split decision. Following this, Ferreira would compile an undefeated record of 9–0, also capturing the Legacy FC Lightweight Championship from Jorge Patino at Legacy FC 25. Ferreira would vacate the title in May 2014, when he signed with the Ultimate Fighting Championship.

=== Ultimate Fighting Championship ===
In his debut, Ferreira faced Colton Smith at UFC Fight Night 44 on June 28, 2014. He won the fight via submission (rear-naked choke), winning a Performance of the Night bonus for the victory.

For his second fight in the promotion, Ferreira faced Ramsey Nijem at UFC 177 on August 30, 2014. He won the back and forth battle via technical knockout due to punches, winning another bonus (this time as Fight of the Night).

Ferreira next faced Beneil Dariush on October 25, 2014, at UFC 179. He lost the fight via unanimous decision.

Ferreira faced Dustin Poirier on April 4, 2015, at UFC Fight Night 63. He lost the fight via knockout in the first round.

Ferreira faced Olivier Aubin-Mercier on January 30, 2016, at UFC on Fox 18. He won the fight by unanimous decision.

Ferreira was expected to face Abel Trujillo on May 29, 2016, at UFC Fight Night 88. However, Ferreira was removed from the fight on May 13 after it was announced that he had been flagged for a potential anti-doping policy violation. He was replaced by promotional newcomer Jordan Rinaldi.

On December 21, 2016, Ferreira accepted a 17-month sanction by the US Anti-Doping Agency for an anti-doping violation after declaring the use of a product that listed and contained a prohibited substance and testing positive for another prohibited substance.

Ferreira faced Jared Gordon on February 18, 2018, at UFC Fight Night 126. He won the fight via TKO in the first round.

Ferreira was expected to face John Makdessi on December 8, 2018, at UFC 231. However, on November 28, 2018, it was reported that Makdessi was removed from the card and was replaced by Jesse Ronson. However, on December 4, 2018. It was announced that Ronson was pulled out of the fight due to being too heavy to safely make Lightweight and was released from UFC. Ronson was replaced by newcomer Kyle Nelson. Ferreira won the fight via TKO in the second round.

Ferreira faced Rustam Khabilov on February 23, 2019, at UFC Fight Night 145. At the weigh-ins, Ferreira weighted at 157 pounds, 1 pound and over the lightweight non-title fight limit of 156. He was fined 20% of his purse which went to his opponent Khabilov. He won the fight by unanimous decision.

Ferreira was scheduled to face Francisco Trinaldo on May 11, 2019, at UFC 237. However, Ferreira was forced out of the bout on weigh-in day as he was deemed medically unfit due to a weight cutting issue. As a result, the bout was cancelled.

Ferreira faced Mairbek Taisumov on September 7, 2019, at UFC 242. He won the fight by unanimous decision.

Ferreira faced Anthony Pettis on January 18, 2020, at UFC 246. Ferreira defeated Pettis by submission in the second round. This win earned him a Performance of the Night award.

As the first fight of his new five-fight contract, Ferreira was scheduled to face Drew Dober on May 2, 2020, at UFC Fight Night: Hermansson vs. Weidman. However, on April 9, Dana White, the president of UFC announced that this event was postponed to a future date The bout with Dober was rescheduled and was expected to take place on November 7, 2020, at UFC on ESPN: Santos vs. Teixeira. In turn, Ferreira pulled out on October 22 due to an illness.

A rematch with Beneil Dariush took place on February 6, 2021, at UFC Fight Night 184. He lost the fight via split decision. This fight earned him the Fight of the Night award.

Ferreira faced Gregor Gillespie on May 8, 2021, at UFC on ESPN 24. At the weigh-ins, Ferreira weighed in at 160.5 pounds, four and a half pounds over the lightweight non-title fight limit. His bout proceeded at catchweight and he was fined 30% of his purse, which went to Gillespie. He lost the fight via technical knockout in round two. The bout was named Fight of the Night, but Ferreira was not eligible to receive the award after missing weight and the full bonus went to Gillespie.

Ferreira was scheduled to face Grant Dawson on October 2, 2021, at UFC Fight Night 193. However, Ferreira pulled out of the fight in early-September citing an injury.

Ferreira faced Mateusz Gamrot on December 19, 2021, at UFC Fight Night 199. He lost the bout in the second round after verbally tapping due to a knee to his ribs.

Ferreira was scheduled to face Drakkar Klose on July 30, 2022, at UFC 277. However, Ferreira was forced out the event due an injury.

Ferreira faced Michael Johnson on May 20, 2023 at UFC Fight Night 223. He won the fight via knockout out in round two. This fight earned him the Performance of the Night award.

Ferreira faced Mateusz Rębecki on May 11, 2024, at UFC on ESPN 56. He won the fight by technical knockout from ground punches at the end of the third round. This fight earned him another Performance of the Night award.

Ferreira faced Grant Dawson on January 18, 2025, at UFC 311. He lost the fight by unanimous decision.

Ferreira was scheduled to face King Green on August 16, 2025 at UFC 319. However, Green suffered an undisclosed injury and the bout was cancelled.

Ferreira faced Alexander Hernandez on September 13, 2025, at UFC Fight Night 259. He lost the fight by technical knockout in the second round.

Ferreira faced Billy Quarantillo on August 8, 2026 at UFC Fight Night 284. He won the fight by unanimous decision. This fight earned him a $100,000 Fight of the Night award.

Ferreira is scheduled to face MarQuel Mederos on January 16, 2027 at UFC Fight Night 296.

== Personal life ==
Ferreira worked as a salesman in a mattress store before getting signed to the UFC. He is married to Yvonne Ferreira, and has five children, with his youngest daughter being born in September 2023.

== Championships and accomplishments ==
- Legacy Fighting Championship
  - Legacy FC Lightweight Championship (one time)
- Ultimate Fighting Championship
  - Fight of the Night (Three times) vs. Ramsey Nijem, Beneil Dariush and Billy Quarantillo
  - Performance of the Night (Four times) vs. Colton Smith, Anthony Pettis, Michael Johnson and Mateusz Rębecki
  - UFC.com Awards
    - 2023: Ranked #10 Knockout of the Year vs. Michael Johnson
- South Texas Fighting Championship
  - STFC Lightweight Championship (one time; former)
- MMAjunkie.com
  - 2023 May Knockout of the Month vs. Michael Johnson

== Mixed martial arts record ==
Professional record breakdown
27 matches	20 wins	7 losses
By knockout	5	4
By submission	7	0
By decision	8	3

Res.	Record	Opponent	Method	Event	Date	Round	Time	Location	Notes
Win	20–7	Billy Quarantillo	Decision (unanimous)	UFC Fight Night: Gamrot vs. Salkilld	August 8, 2026	3	5:00	Las Vegas, Nevada, United States	Fight of the Night.
Loss	19–7	Alexander Hernandez	TKO (punches)	UFC Fight Night: Lopes vs. Silva	September 13, 2025	2	3:46	San Antonio, Texas, United States	
Loss	19–6	Grant Dawson	Decision (unanimous)	UFC 311	January 18, 2025	3	5:00	Inglewood, California, United States	
Win	19–5	Mateusz Rębecki	TKO (punches)	UFC on ESPN: Lewis vs. Nascimento	May 11, 2024	3	4:51	St. Louis, Missouri, United States	Performance of the Night.
Win	18–5	Michael Johnson	KO (punch)	UFC Fight Night: Dern vs. Hill	May 20, 2023	2	1:50	Las Vegas, Nevada, United States	Performance of the Night.
Loss	17–5	Mateusz Gamrot	TKO (submission to knee to the body)	UFC Fight Night: Lewis vs. Daukaus	December 18, 2021	2	3:26	Las Vegas, Nevada, United States	
Loss	17–4	Gregor Gillespie	TKO (elbows and punches)	UFC on ESPN: Rodriguez vs. Waterson	May 8, 2021	2	4:51	Las Vegas, Nevada, United States	Catchweight (160.5 lb) bout; Ferreira missed weight. Fight of the Night.
Loss	17–3	Beneil Dariush	Decision (split)	UFC Fight Night: Overeem vs. Volkov	February 6, 2021	3	5:00	Las Vegas, Nevada, United States	Fight of the Night.
Win	17–2	Anthony Pettis	Submission (rear-naked choke)	UFC 246	January 18, 2020	2	1:46	Las Vegas, Nevada, United States	Performance of the Night.
Win	16–2	Mairbek Taisumov	Decision (unanimous)	UFC 242	September 7, 2019	3	5:00	Abu Dhabi, United Arab Emirates	
Win	15–2	Rustam Khabilov	Decision (unanimous)	UFC Fight Night: Błachowicz vs. Santos	February 23, 2019	3	5:00	Prague, Czech Republic	Catchweight (157 lb) bout; Ferreira missed weight.
Win	14–2	Kyle Nelson	TKO (punches)	UFC 231	December 8, 2018	2	1:23	Toronto, Ontario, Canada	
Win	13–2	Jared Gordon	TKO (punches)	UFC Fight Night: Cowboy vs. Medeiros	February 18, 2018	1	1:58	Austin, Texas, United States	
Win	12–2	Olivier Aubin-Mercier	Decision (unanimous)	UFC on Fox: Johnson vs. Bader	January 30, 2016	3	5:00	Newark, New Jersey, United States	
Loss	11–2	Dustin Poirier	KO (punches)	UFC Fight Night: Mendes vs. Lamas	April 4, 2015	1	3:45	Fairfax, Virginia, United States	
Loss	11–1	Beneil Dariush	Decision (unanimous)	UFC 179	October 25, 2014	3	5:00	Rio de Janeiro, Brazil	
Win	11–0	Ramsey Nijem	TKO (punches)	UFC 177	August 30, 2014	2	1:53	Sacramento, California, United States	Fight of the Night.
Win	10–0	Colton Smith	Submission (rear-naked choke)	UFC Fight Night: Swanson vs. Stephens	June 28, 2014	1	0:38	San Antonio, Texas United States	Performance of the Night.
Win	9–0	Jorge Patino	Decision (unanimous)	Legacy FC 25	November 15, 2013	5	5:00	Houston, Texas, United States	Won the Legacy FC Lightweight Championship.
Win	8–0	Chris Feist	Decision (unanimous)	Legacy FC 24	October 11, 2013	3	5:00	Dallas, Texas, United States	
Win	7–0	Carlo Prater	Decision (unanimous)	Legacy FC 20	May 31, 2013	3	5:00	Corpus Christi, Texas, United States	
Win	6–0	Danny Salinas	Submission (rear-naked choke)	South Texas FC 24	February 22, 2013	2	1:41	McAllen, Texas, United States	Won the STFC Lightweight Championship.
Win	5–0	Jorge Cortez	Submission (kimura)	South Texas FC 23	December 7, 2012	1	0:43	McAllen, Texas, United States	Welterweight bout.
Win	4–0	Travonne Hobbs	Submission (arm-triangle choke)	Ultimate Warrior Fighting 4	June 30, 2012	2	1:57	Corpus Christi, Texas, United States	Lightweight debut.
Win	3–0	Hector Muñoz	Submission (armbar)	Ultimate Warrior Fighting 2	May 4, 2012	1	3:38	Corpus Christi, Texas, United States	Welterweight debut.
Win	2–0	Clint Roberts	Submission (rear-naked choke)	Ultimate Warrior Fighting 1	November 26, 2011	2	0:39	Pharr, Texas, United States	
Win	1–0	Joseph Daily	Decision (split)	South Texas FC 15	April 15, 2011	3	3:00	McAllen, Texas, United States	Middleweight debut.

== See also ==
- List of current UFC fighters
- List of male mixed martial artists
