= Garett Whiteley =

American mixed martial arts fighter

- Born: December 13, 1980 (age 45); Indianapolis, Indiana, United States
- Other names: Goodnight
- Nationality: American
- Height: 6 ft 0 in (1.83 m)
- Weight: 155 lb (70 kg; 11 st 1 lb)
- Division: Lightweight (MMA)
- Fighting out of: Indianapolis, Indiana, United States
- Team: IndyBoxing and Grappling
- Years active: 2007 - present

Mixed martial arts record
- Total: 10
- Wins: 7
- By knockout: 4
- By submission: 3
- Losses: 3
- By knockout: 1
- By decision: 2

Amateur record
- Total: 4
- Wins: 4
- By knockout: 1
- By submission: 3

Other information
- Mixed martial arts record from Sherdog
- Last updated on: October 9, 2013

Garett Whiteley (born December 13, 1980) is an American mixed martial artist who competes in the Lightweight division. He is currently signed with the UFC.

== MMA career ==
After turning pro in mid 2010, Whiteley went undefeated with a perfect 7–0 record, 6 of which did not go past the first round. He holds a win over UFC veteran Jason Gilliam.

=== Ultimate Fighting Championship ===
Whiteley made his UFC debut at UFC Fight Night 29 in Brazil, against fellow Octagon newcomer Alan Patrick. Whiteley was defeated by first-round technical knockout.

In his second fight with the promotion, Whiteley fought Vinc Pichel at UFC Fight Night: Rockhold vs. Philippou. Whiteley lost the fight via unanimous decision.

Whiteley next fought David Michaud on December 13, 2014, at UFC on Fox: dos Santos vs. Miocic. He lost the fight via unanimous decision.

== Mixed martial arts record ==
Professional record breakdown
10 matches	7 wins	3 losses
By knockout	4	1
By submission	3	0
By decision	0	2

Res.	Record	Opponent	Method	Event	Date	Round	Time	Location	Notes
Loss	7–3	David Michaud	Decision (unanimous)	UFC on Fox: dos Santos vs. Miocic	December 13, 2014	3	5:00	Phoenix, Arizona, United States	
Loss	7–2	Vinc Pichel	Decision (unanimous)	UFC Fight Night: Rockhold vs. Philippou	January 15, 2014	3	5:00	Duluth, Georgia, United States	
Loss	7–1	Alan Patrick	TKO (punches)	UFC Fight Night 29	October 9, 2013	1	3:54	Barueri, São Paulo, Brazil	UFC debut.
Win	7–0	Jason Gilliam	TKO (punches)	Midwest Fight Series	July 19, 2013	1	0:45	Indianapolis, Indiana, United States	Catchweight bout at 180 lbs.
Win	6–0	John Morehouse	TKO (punches)	Midwest Fight Series	February 8, 2013	1	4:39	Indianapolis, Indiana, United States	
Win	5–0	Evan DeLong	Submission (triangle choke)	Absolute Cage Fighting 2	November 17, 2012	3	4:36	Indianapolis, Indiana, United States	
Win	4–0	Joel Miller	TKO (punches)	Absolute Cage Fighting 1	August 25, 2012	1	0:39	Indianapolis, Indiana, United States	
Win	3–0	Ryan McIntosh	Submission (punches)	PCF - TWC 9: Berserk	July 16, 2011	1	2:32	Indianapolis, Indiana, United States	
Win	2–0	Bryan Neville	TKO (knees & punches)	LOF 44 - Against All Odds	January 21, 2011	1	1:30	Indianapolis, Indiana, United States	
Win	1–0	Miles Shrake	Submission (rear naked choke)	PCF - Total Warrior Challenge 6	June 12, 2010	1	3:13	Indianapolis, Indiana, United States	Pro debut.
