= Harper College =

Community college in Palatine, Illinois, US

- William Rainey Harper College
- Type: Public community college
- Established: 1965; 61 years ago
- Endowment: $41.96 million (2024)
- President: Avis Proctor
- Faculty: 201 full-time and 437 part-time
- Administrative staff: 810 full and part-time
- Students: 13,477
- Location: Palatine, Illinois, United States; 42.081°N 88.071°W
- Campus: Suburban
- Colors: Blue and White
- Sporting affiliations: NJCAA Division III
- Mascot: Hawk
- Website: harpercollege.edu

William Rainey Harper College is a public community college in Palatine, Illinois. It was established by referendum in 1965 and opened in September 1967. It is named for William Rainey Harper, a pioneer in the junior college movement in the United States and the first president of the University of Chicago.

== Campus ==
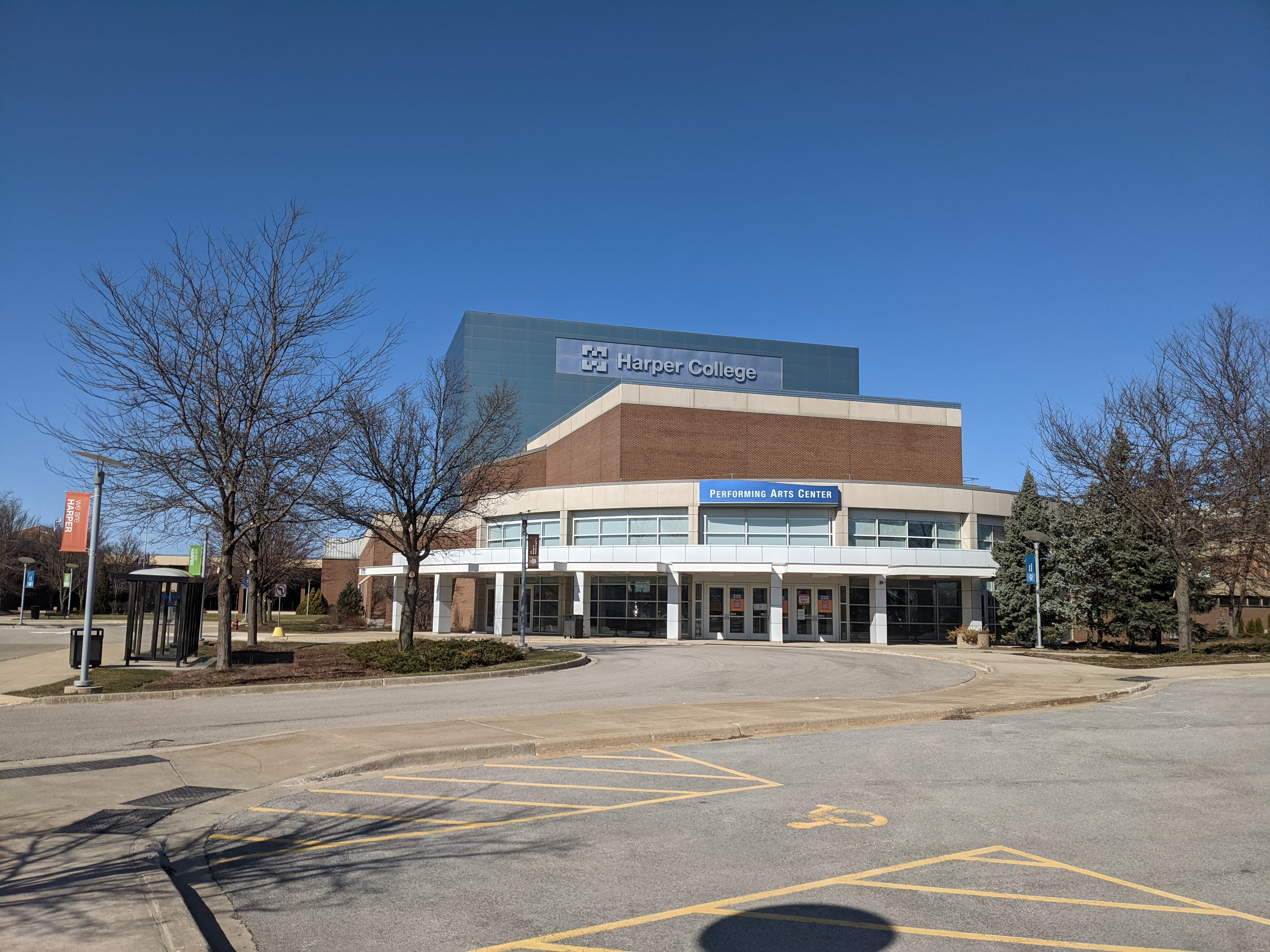
Harper College's Performing Arts Center

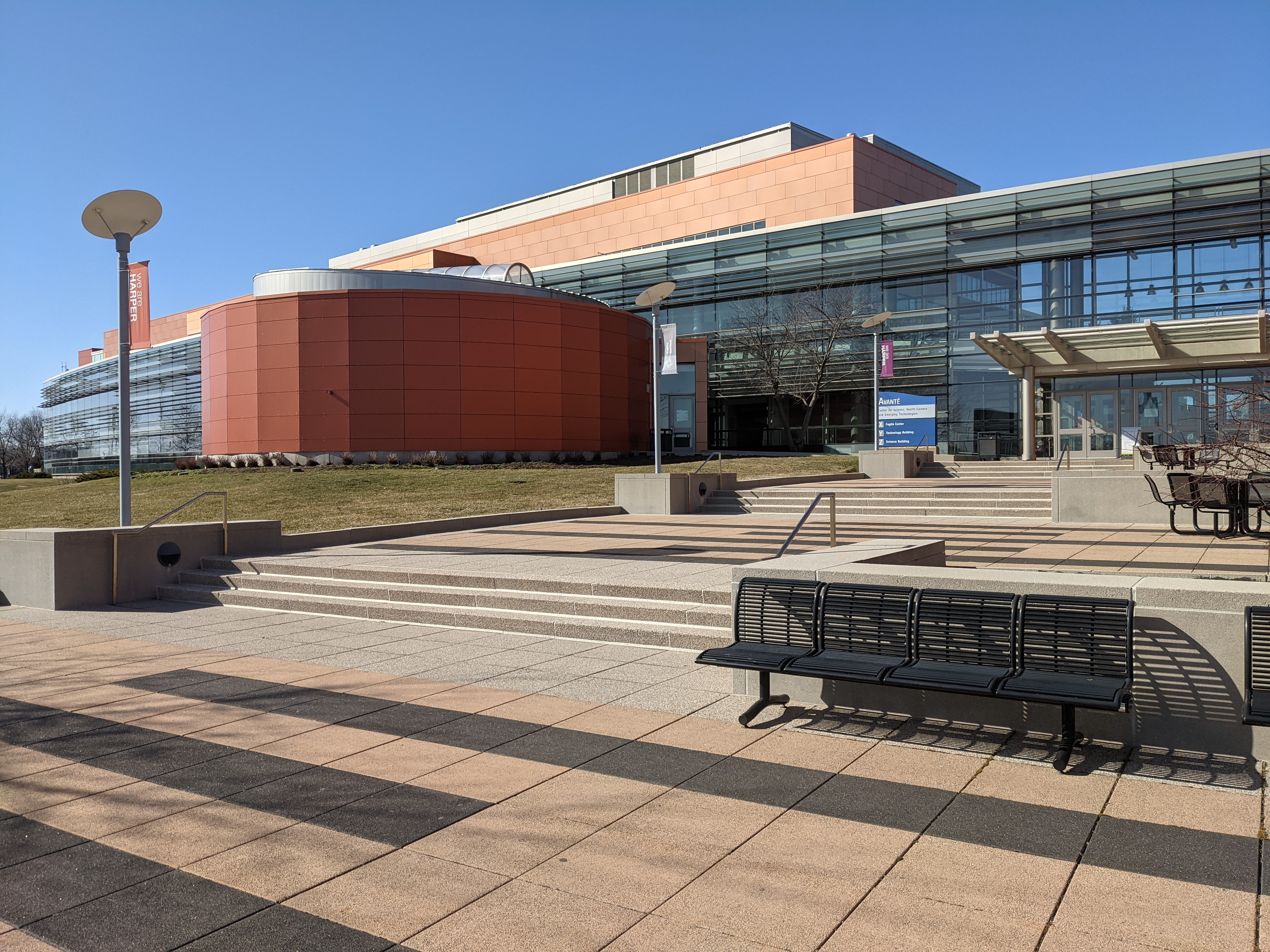
The Avanté Center

Harper College has a 200-acre (80.9 ha) campus, about 25 miles (40 km) northwest of downtown Chicago, in the suburb of Palatine, Illinois.

Harper also offers classes and services at other locations:

- Harper College Learning and Career Center in Prospect Heights, Illinois
- The Harper Professional Center in Schaumburg, Illinois
- Harper College works in partnership with the Illinois Small Business Development Center (ISBDC), which is part of the Harper Professional Center in Schaumburg.
- Harper College works in partnership with the North Suburban Cook County American Job Center in Wheeling, Illinois

== Service area ==
Harper College District 512 comprises Arlington Heights, Barrington, Barrington Hills, Elk Grove Village, Hoffman Estates, Inverness, Lake Barrington, Mount Prospect, North Barrington, Palatine, Prospect Heights, Rolling Meadows, Schaumburg, South Barrington, Tower Lakes, Wheeling and small parts of Buffalo Grove, Carpentersville, Deer Park, Des Plaines, Fox River Grove, Hanover Park, and Roselle.

== Athletics ==
=== Football ===
The football program was eliminated in January 2012.

- 2003 NJCAA Division III National Champions
- 2004 NJCAA Division III National Champions
- 2008 NJCAA Division III National Champions
- Notable coaches, John Eliasik (member of NJCAA and Region IV Halls-of-Fame) and Dragan Teonic (2008 National Champions).

=== Cross country ===
- NJCAA National Division III Champions 2011
- NJCAA National Division III Champions 2012
- NJCAA National Division III Champions 2013
- NJCAA National Division III Champions 2014
- NJCAA National Division III Champions 2015
- NJCAA National Division III Champions 2016
- NJCAA National Division III Champions 2017
- NJCAA National Division III Champions 2018
- NJCAA National Division III Champions 2023

=== Track and field ===
- NJCAA National Division III Champions 2005
- NJCAA National Division III Champions 2006
- NJCAA National Division III Champions 2007
- NJCAA National Division III Champions 2008
- NJCAA National Division III Champions 2009
- NJCAA National Division III Champions 2011
- NJCAA National Division III Champions 2012
- NJCAA National Division III Runners-Up 2013(M)
- NJCAA National Division III Runners-Up 2015(M)
- NJCAA National Division III Runners-Up 2017(W)
- NJCAA National Division III Champions 2023(W)

=== Wrestling ===
- Coach Dan Loprieno inducted in 2008 to the NJCAA Region IV Hall of Fame.
- NJCAA 2010 Wrestling Champions
- NJCAA Division III National Champions in 2006 and 2001. The 2006–07 team finished second in the nation, earned fifth consecutive district title and had 10 National qualifiers and seven All-Americans.

=== Women's basketball ===
- Julie Jestus, 2006 NJCAA Region IV Hall of Fame

=== Women's volleyball ===
- NJCAA Division III National Champions 2016
- NJCAA Division III National Runners-Up 2017

== Notable alumni ==
- Angelo Dawkins, professional wrestler
- Quincy Black, professional football player
- Curtis Blaydes (attended), professional mixed martial artist
- Will Brooks, college football player and professional mixed martial artist
- Mauro Fiore, cinematographer
- Jason and Clay Guida, professional mixed martial artists
- Dave Kingman, professional baseball player
- Charlie Kirk, right-wing political activist and talk show host (attended)
- E. E. Knight, science fiction and fantasy author
- Al Levine, professional baseball player
- John Loprieno, actor, writer, director
- Marlee Matlin, actress
- Rosemary Mulligan, politician
- Steve Octavien, professional football player
- Haley Reinhart, singer-songwriter and actress
- Mike Rio, college football player and professional mixed martial artist
- Christopher J. Schneider, sociologist
- Rob Sherman, political activist, perennial candidate, and businessman
