= Vinc Pichel =

American mixed martial arts fighter

- Born: Vincent Alan Pichel; November 23, 1982 (age 43); Lancaster, California, U.S.
- Other names: From Hell
- Height: 5 ft 10 in (1.78 m)
- Weight: 155.8 lb (70.7 kg; 11.13 st)
- Division: Lightweight
- Reach: 72 in (183 cm)
- Stance: Orthodox
- Fighting out of: Englewood, Colorado, U.S.
- Team: Big John McCarthy's Ultimate Training Academy (2007–2012); Alliance MMA (2012); Peterson Grapplers (2012–2021); Street Sports Simi Valley; Sugarfoot Training Center; Factory X (2021–2025)
- Rank: Black belt in Brazilian Jiu-Jitsu
- Years active: 2009–2025

Mixed martial arts record
- Total: 19
- Wins: 14
- By knockout: 8
- By decision: 6
- Losses: 5
- By knockout: 1
- By submission: 1
- By decision: 3

Other information
- Mixed martial arts record from Sherdog

Vincent Alan Pichel (born November 23, 1982) is an American former professional mixed martial artist who competed in the Lightweight division of the Ultimate Fighting Championship, achieving a 7–5 record in the promotion. A professional from 2009 to 2025, Pichel was also a contestant on The Ultimate Fighter: Live.

== Early life ==
Growing up in Canoga Park, Los Angeles, Pichel was expelled from multiple schools due to his behavior during his youth. He never graduated, and at the age of 15 he was already using drugs which ultimately led him to get kicked out from his home by his mother. For five years he was using drugs and lacking permanent residence but after getting introduced to MMA by his friend, Pichel straightened out and started ambitiously training.

== Mixed martial arts career ==
=== Early career ===
Pichel compiled an amateur record of 10–1 before turning professional in 2009. He won his first seven fights by KO/TKO before trying out for The Ultimate Fighter: Live.

=== The Ultimate Fighter: Live ===
Pichel was one of 32 Lightweight fighters announced by the UFC to participate in first live season of The Ultimate Fighter reality show. Pichel advanced into the TUF house and won two bouts before losing to Al Iaquinta.

=== Ultimate Fighting Championship ===
After reaching the semifinals in The Ultimate Fighter: Live, Pichel was given an opportunity in the UFC. He made his official UFC debut on December 15, 2012. Pichel fought promotional newcomer Rustam Khabilov and lost the fight via KO due to a suplex and punches in the first round.

Pichel next fought Garett Whiteley at UFC Fight Night: Rockhold vs. Philippou on January 15, 2014. He won the fight by a unanimous decision.

Pichel faced Anthony Njokuani at UFC 173 on May 24, 2014. He won the fight via unanimous decision. In the months after the fight, Pichel suffered a torn labrum and bicep, sidelining him for three years.

After an extended hiatus, Pichel returned to face Damien Brown on June 11, 2017, at UFC Fight Night 110. He won the fight via knockout in the first round.

Pichel faced Joaquim Silva on January 27, 2018, at UFC on Fox: Jacaré vs. Brunson 2. He won the fight by unanimous decision.

Pichel faced Gregor Gillespie on June 1, 2018, at UFC Fight Night 131. He lost the fight via arm-triangle choke in the second round.

Pichel faced Roosevelt Roberts on June 29, 2019, at UFC on ESPN 3. He won the fight via unanimous decision. The fight was the last of his prevailing contract with the UFC, making him a free agent.

Pichel was scheduled to face Alexander Yakovlev on November 9, 2019, at UFC on ESPN+ 21 However, Pichel pulled out of the fight on October 24 citing an undisclosed injury and was replaced by Roosevelt Roberts.

Having recovered from the hip surgery that pulled him from the Yakovlev fight, Pichel faced Jim Miller at UFC 252 on August 15, 2020. He won the fight by unanimous decision.

Pichel faced Austin Hubbard on August 21, 2021, at UFC on ESPN 29. He won the fight via unanimous decision.

Pichel was scheduled to face Mark Madsen on February 12, 2022, at UFC 271. However, they were moved to UFC 273 for unknown reasons. He lost the fight via unanimous decision.

Pichel was scheduled to face Jesse Ronson on October 1, 2022, at UFC Fight Night 211. However, Pichel withdrew due to an undisclosed injury and was replaced by Joaquim Silva.

Pichel was scheduled to face Benoît Saint-Denis on July 1, 2023, at UFC on ESPN 48. However, Pichel pulled out in late-May due to injury and was replaced by Ismael Bonfim.

Pichel was scheduled to face Ismael Bonfim on November 4, 2023, at UFC Fight Night 231. At the weigh-ins, Ismael Bonfim weighed in at 159.5 pounds, three and a half pounds over the lightweight non-title fight limit. As a result, his scheduled bout with Ismael Bonfim was scrapped. The pair was eventually rebooked for UFC 301 on May 4, 2024. He lost the fight via unanimous decision.

Replacing Joaquim Silva who withdrew for unknown reasons, Pichel is scheduled to face Rafa García on March 29, 2025, at UFC on ESPN 64. Pichel lost to García via unanimous decision.

On April 28, 2025, Pichel announced his retirement from mixed martial arts competition.

== Personal life ==
Pichel formerly worked for AAA while also fighting in the UFC. Later, he went to school to become an electrician instead.

== Mixed martial arts record ==
Professional record breakdown
19 matches	14 wins	5 losses
By knockout	8	1
By submission	0	1
By decision	6	3

Res.	Record	Opponent	Method	Event	Date	Round	Time	Location	Notes
Loss	14–5	Rafa García	Decision (unanimous)	UFC on ESPN: Moreno vs. Erceg	March 29, 2025	3	5:00	Mexico City, Mexico	
Loss	14–4	Ismael Bonfim	Decision (unanimous)	UFC 301	May 4, 2024	3	5:00	Rio de Janeiro, Brazil	
Loss	14–3	Mark Madsen	Decision (unanimous)	UFC 273	April 9, 2022	3	5:00	Jacksonville, Florida, United States	
Win	14–2	Austin Hubbard	Decision (unanimous)	UFC on ESPN: Cannonier vs. Gastelum	August 21, 2021	3	5:00	Las Vegas, Nevada, United States	
Win	13–2	Jim Miller	Decision (unanimous)	UFC 252	August 15, 2020	3	5:00	Las Vegas, Nevada, United States	
Win	12–2	Roosevelt Roberts	Decision (unanimous)	UFC on ESPN: Ngannou vs. dos Santos	June 29, 2019	3	5:00	Minneapolis, Minnesota, United States	
Loss	11–2	Gregor Gillespie	Submission (arm-triangle choke)	UFC Fight Night: Rivera vs. Moraes	June 1, 2018	2	4:06	Utica, New York, United States	
Win	11–1	Joaquim Silva	Decision (unanimous)	UFC on Fox: Jacaré vs. Brunson 2	January 27, 2018	3	5:00	Charlotte, North Carolina, United States	
Win	10–1	Damien Brown	KO (punches)	UFC Fight Night: Lewis vs. Hunt	June 11, 2017	1	3:37	Auckland, New Zealand	
Win	9–1	Anthony Njokuani	Decision (unanimous)	UFC 173	May 24, 2014	3	5:00	Las Vegas, Nevada, United States	
Win	8–1	Garett Whiteley	Decision (unanimous)	UFC Fight Night: Rockhold vs. Philippou	January 15, 2014	3	5:00	Duluth, Georgia, United States	
Loss	7–1	Rustam Khabilov	KO (suplex and punches)	The Ultimate Fighter: Team Carwin vs. Team Nelson Finale	December 15, 2012	1	2:15	Las Vegas, Nevada, United States	
Win	7–0	David Gardner	TKO (punches)	Fight Club OC	August 18, 2011	2	1:47	Costa Mesa, California, United States	
Win	6–0	Matt Bahntge	KO (punch)	All Stars Promotions MMA	March 25, 2011	2	0:32	Commerce, California, United States	
Win	5–0	Emilio Chavez	TKO (punches)	Respect the Cage	January 15, 2011	2	2:52	Pomona, California, United States	
Win	4–0	Rodney Rhoden	TKO (punches)	All Star Promotions: Civic Disobedience 4	December 4, 2010	2	1:56	Los Angeles, California, United States	
Win	3–0	Anthony McDavitt	TKO (punches)	Santa Ynez MMA	June 4, 2010	2	0:23	Santa Ynez, California, United States	
Win	2–0	Miles Howard	TKO (punches)	National Fight Alliance MMA: Resurrection	December 18, 2009	2	1:05	Ventura, California, United States	
Win	1–0	Franky Childs	KO (punches)	Hitman Fighting Productions	August 15, 2009	1	2:15	Pomona, California, United States	

Exhibition record breakdown		
4 matches	3 wins	1 loss
By submission	2	0
By decision	1	1

Res.	Record	Opponent	Method	Event	Date	Round	Time	Location	Notes
Loss	3–1	Al Iaquinta	Decision (unanimous)	The Ultimate Fighter: Live	May 25, 2012 (Live airdate)	2	5:00	Las Vegas, Nevada, United States	The Ultimate Fighter: Live Semifinal round.
Win	3–0	Chris Saunders	Decision (majority)	The Ultimate Fighter: Live	May 18, 2012 (Live airdate)	2	5:00	Las Vegas, Nevada, United States	The Ultimate Fighter: Live Quarterfinal round.
Win	2–0	John Cofer	Submission (arm triangle choke)	The Ultimate Fighter: Live	April 20, 2012 (Live airdate)	3	0:44	Las Vegas, Nevada, United States	The Ultimate Fighter: Live Preliminary round.
Win	1–0	Cody Pfister	Submission (rear naked choke)	The Ultimate Fighter: Live	March 9, 2012 (Live airdate)	1	3:39	Las Vegas, Nevada, United States	The Ultimate Fighter: Live Elimination round.

== See also ==
- List of male mixed martial artists
