= Derek Brunson =

American mixed martial artist (born 1984)

- Born: Derek T. Brunson; January 4, 1984 (age 42); Wilmington, North Carolina, U.S.
- Other names: The One
- Height: 6 ft 1 in (185 cm)
- Weight: 186 lb (84 kg; 13.3 st)
- Division: Middleweight
- Reach: 77 in (196 cm)
- Style: Wrestling, BJJ
- Stance: Southpaw
- Fighting out of: Wilmington, North Carolina, U.S.
- Team: Port City Sports Performance (until 2019); Kill Cliff FC (2019–present); Renzo Gracie Academy; Jackson's MMA (formerly)
- Rank: Black belt in Brazilian Jiu-Jitsu under Renzo Gracie
- Wrestling: NCAA Division II Wrestling
- Years active: 2010–present

Mixed martial arts record
- Total: 33
- Wins: 24
- By knockout: 12
- By submission: 4
- By decision: 8
- Losses: 9
- By knockout: 7
- By decision: 2

Other information
- University: North Carolina at Pembroke
- Website: http://brunsonsmmaandfitness.com
- Mixed martial arts record from Sherdog

Derek T. Brunson (born January 4, 1984) is an American professional mixed martial artist who competes in the Light heavyweight division of the Professional Fighters League (PFL). He is most notable for his 21 fight tenure in the Ultimate Fighting Championship (UFC) between 2012 and 2023, where he competed in the Middleweight division.

== Background ==
Brunson attended John T. Hoggard High School in Wilmington, North Carolina. He was a member of the school's cheerleading, football. track, and wrestling teams. He was coached in high school wrestling by coach Dan Willis. Brunson placed third at the 2002 NCHSAA 4A wrestling state tournament in the 215-pound weight class.

In college, he attended the University of North Carolina at Pembroke, where as a member of the wrestling team, he was a three-time NCAA Division II All-American. Brunson majored in criminal justice and minored in sociology.

Following college, he turned his attention to mixed martial arts. Brunson was inspired by his high school classmate Shelly Johnson to pursue a career in fighting. Prior to his mixed martial arts career, Brunson was a therapist.

== Mixed martial arts career ==
Brunson made his professional MMA debut in May 2010 against John Bryant where he won by a rear-naked choke in under a minute. He then won his next five fights with none of them making it past 2:30 of the first round.

=== Strikeforce ===
Brunson made his Strikeforce debut on June 24, 2011, at Strikeforce Challengers: Fodor vs. Terry against undefeated Jeremy Hamilton. He won the fight via unanimous decision.

In a quick turnaround, Brunson fought his second fight for Strikeforce just over one month after his debut. He faced Lumumba Sayers on the undercard of Strikeforce: Fedor vs. Henderson on July 30, 2011. He won the fight via submission in the first round.

Brunson's next fight was on November 18, 2011, at Strikeforce Challengers: Britt vs. Sayers against Nate James. He won the fight via unanimous decision.

He was scheduled to face Ronaldo Souza on March 3, 2012, at Strikeforce: Tate vs. Rousey. However, the Ohio State Athletic Commission denied his fight license based on an eye exam he had submitted. Brunson fought wearing contacts in all of his bouts, but Ohio has a rule against this. He immediately scheduled a Lasik procedure and missed about six weeks. He later faced Souza on August 18, 2012, at Strikeforce: Rousey vs. Kaufman and was defeated by KO at :41 of the 1st round.

=== The Ultimate Fighter ===
Brunson was accepted to compete in The Ultimate Fighter 17, but on the first day of filming he was pulled from the competition due to Showtime having yet to release him from his contract.

=== Ultimate Fighting Championship ===
Brunson made his UFC debut replacing an injured Karlos Vemola against Chris Leben on December 29, 2012, at UFC 155. Despite being a late replacement and heavy underdog, Brunson utilized his superior wrestling to defeat Leben via unanimous decision.

He was expected to face Ronny Markes on June 8, 2013, at UFC on Fuel TV 10. However, the bout was scrapped on the day of the weigh in as Markes was involved in a traffic accident. While Markes was not seriously injured, the incident prevented him from competing.

Brunson was expected to face Yoel Romero on August 31, 2013, at UFC 164 but was eventually forced off the card with an injury.

He was expected to face Antonio Braga Neto on November 6, 2013, at UFC Fight Night 31. However, Neto pulled out of the bout citing an injury and was replaced by Brian Houston. Brunson won the fight in impressive fashion early, connecting with a head kick on Houston and then securing a rear-naked choke submission.

The bout with Romero was rescheduled for January 15, 2014, at UFC Fight Night 35. After winning the first two rounds, Brunson was dropped by a left hook and lost the fight via TKO due to elbows on the ground in the third round. Both fighters earned a $50,000 Fight of the Night bonus award.

On February 15, 2014, it was announced that Brunson had signed a four-fight contract with UFC.

Brunson was expected to face Lorenz Larkin on August 2, 2014, at UFC 176. After UFC 176 was cancelled, Larkin/Brunson was rescheduled and eventually took place on August 30, 2014, at UFC 177. Brunson won the fight via unanimous decision.

Brunson was expected to face Ed Herman on December 13, 2014, at UFC on Fox 13. However, the bout was scrapped just hours before the fight, as Brunson was stricken with a stomach ailment. Subsequently, the bout with Herman was rescheduled and took place on January 31, 2015, at UFC 183. Brunson won the fight via TKO in the first round.

Brunson was expected to face Krzysztof Jotko on June 20, 2015, at UFC Fight Night 69. However, Brunson pulled out of the fight on June 9 citing a rib injury and was briefly replaced by Uriah Hall. Three days after the booking, Hall was removed due to an alleged visa issue. In turn, Jotko was removed from the card entirely.

Brunson faced Sam Alvey on August 8, 2015, at UFC Fight Night 73. He won the fight via TKO in the first round.

Brunson next faced Roan Carneiro on February 21, 2016, at UFC Fight Night 83. He won the fight via TKO, earning his third consecutive TKO stoppage in the first round.

He was scheduled to face Gegard Mousasi on July 9, 2016, at UFC 200. However, he later was forced to pull out of the bout.

Brunson faced Uriah Hall on September 17, 2016, at UFC Fight Night 94. Brunson won the fight via TKO in the first round after dropping Hall with a left hook and finishing him with a flurry of ground and pound.

Brunson faced Robert Whittaker on November 27, 2016, at UFC Fight Night 101. He lost the back and forth fight via first-round TKO. Both participants were awarded a Fight of the Night bonus.

Brunson faced Anderson Silva on February 11, 2017, at UFC 208. He lost the fight via unanimous decision. 20 out of 24 media sources scored the fight in favor of Brunson.

Brunson fought Dan Kelly on June 11, 2017, at UFC Fight Night 110. He won by knockout in the first round after dropping Kelly with a straight left and finishing him off with a barrage of ground and pound.

Brunson faced Lyoto Machida on October 28, 2017, at UFC Fight Night 119. He won the fight via knockout in the first round. This win also earned him a Performance of the Night bonus award.

A rematch with Ronaldo Souza took place on January 27, 2018, in the main event at UFC on Fox 27. Brunson lost the fight via TKO in the first round.

He was expected to face Antônio Carlos Júnior on August 4, 2018, at UFC 227. However, Brunson pulled out of the fight in early July citing an eye injury.

Brunson faced Israel Adesanya on November 3, 2018, at UFC 230. He lost the fight via technical knockout in round one.

Brunson faced Elias Theodorou on May 4, 2019, at UFC Fight Night 151. He won the fight by unanimous decision.

He faced Ian Heinisch on August 17, 2019, at UFC 241. He won the fight by unanimous decision.

In December 2019, Brunson announced on his social media that he had signed a new, six-fight contract with the UFC.

Brunson was expected to face Edmen Shahbazyan on March 7, 2020, at UFC 248. However it was announced on February 20 that the bout had been rescheduled and would take place on April 11, 2020, at UFC Fight Night: Overeem vs. Harris. Due to the COVID-19 pandemic, the event was eventually postponed. The bout eventually was scheduled on August 1, 2020, at UFC Fight Night: Brunson vs. Shahbazyan. He won the fight via technical knockout in round three.

Brunson faced Kevin Holland on March 20, 2021, at UFC on ESPN 21. He won the fight via unanimous decision.

Brunson faced Darren Till on September 4, 2021, at UFC Fight Night: Brunson vs. Till. He won the fight via rear-naked choke submission in round three.

Brunson was scheduled to face Jared Cannonier on January 22, 2022, at UFC 270. However, for undisclosed reasons the bout was moved to UFC 271 on February 12, 2022. He lost the fight via knockout in round two. Brunson stated that his next fight will be his final fight in mixed martial arts.

Brunson was scheduled to face Jack Hermansson on December 3, 2022, at UFC on ESPN 42. However, Brunson withdrew due to an undisclosed injury and was replaced by Roman Dolidze.

Brunson faced Dricus du Plessis on March 4, 2023, at UFC 285. He lost the fight via technical knockout due to a corner stoppage at 4:59 of the second round.

Brunson was scheduled to face Roman Dolidze at UFC 295 on November 11, 2023. On September 14, 2023, the fight was scrapped, as it was announced Brunson had parted ways with the UFC.

=== Professional Fighters League ===
After parting ways with the UFC on October 5, 2023, it was announced that Brunson had signed a multi-fight deal with the Professional Fighters League, and that he would be a participant in their 2024 season as a light heavyweight.

Brunson made his PFL debut against Ray Cooper III on November 24, 2023 at PFL 10. At weigh-ins, Cooper came in at 186.8 pounds, .8 pounds over the limit, leading him to being fined a percentage of his purse which went to Brunson and the bout was held at a catchweight. Brunson won the fight by unanimous decision.

=== Global Fight League ===
Brunson was scheduled to face Omari Akhmedov in the inaugural Global Fight League event on May 24, 2025 at GFL 1. However, all GFL events were cancelled indefinitely.

== Professional grappling career ==
Brunson faced Rodolfo Vieira in the main event of ADXC 7 on November 17, 2024. He lost the match by submission.

== Bare-knuckle boxing ==
Brunson made his debut with Bare Knuckle Fighting Championship against Theo Doukas in the cruiserweight co-main event on November 20, 2026 at BKFC Fight Night 49. He won the fight via TKO in the second round.

== Personal life ==
Brunson has four children; he has never smoked a cigarette or drunk alcohol in his life.

== Championships and accomplishments ==
=== Mixed martial arts ===
- Ultimate Fighting Championship
  - Fight of the Night (Two times) vs. Yoel Romero and Robert Whittaker
  - Performance of the Night (One time) vs. Lyoto Machida
  - Tied (Anderson Silva & Robert Whittaker) for fourth most wins in UFC Middleweight division history (14)
  - Tied (Nate Marquardt, Chris Leben & Brendan Allen) for third most finishes in UFC Middleweight division history (9)
  - Tied (Anderson Silva & Thales Leites) for fifth most bouts in UFC Middleweight division history (21)
  - Tied (Michael Bisping, Yoel Romero, Gregory Rodrigues & Chris Leben) for fourth most knockouts in UFC Middleweight division history (7)
  - Tied (Rafael Natal) for third most takedowns in UFC Middleweight division history (36)
  - Fifth most control time in UFC Middleweight division history (1:09:34)
  - Fifth most top position time in UFC Middleweight division history (50:33)
  - UFC.com Awards
    - 2016: Ranked #10 Fight of the Year vs. Robert Whittaker
- Sherdog
  - 2017 Robbery of the Year vs. Anderson Silva
- MMAJunkie.com
  - 2017 Robbery of the Year vs. Anderson Silva
- MMADNA.nl
  - 2017 Robbery of the Year vs. Anderson Silva

=== Amateur wrestling ===
- National Collegiate Athletic Association
  - NCAA Division II All-American out of University of North Carolina at Pembroke (2003, 2005, 2007)
- North Carolina High School Athletic Association
  - North Carolina 4A 215 lb 3rd place out of John T. Hoggard High School (2002)

=== Other accomplishments ===
- Young Alumnus of the Year 2014 (UNC Pembroke)
- UNC Pembroke Athletics Hall of Fame, Inducted 2016

== Mixed martial arts record ==
Professional record breakdown
33 matches	24 wins	9 losses
By knockout	12	7
By submission	4	0
By decision	8	2

Res.	Record	Opponent	Method	Event	Date	Round	Time	Location	Notes
Win	24–9	Ray Cooper III	Decision (unanimous)	PFL 10 (2023)	November 24, 2023	3	5:00	Washington, D.C., United States	Catchweight (186.8 lb) bout; Cooper missed weight.
Loss	23–9	Dricus du Plessis	TKO (corner stoppage)	UFC 285	March 4, 2023	2	4:59	Las Vegas, Nevada, United States	
Loss	23–8	Jared Cannonier	KO (elbows)	UFC 271	February 12, 2022	2	4:29	Houston, Texas, United States	UFC Middleweight title eliminator.
Win	23–7	Darren Till	Submission (rear-naked choke)	UFC Fight Night: Brunson vs. Till	September 4, 2021	3	2:13	Las Vegas, Nevada, United States	
Win	22–7	Kevin Holland	Decision (unanimous)	UFC on ESPN: Brunson vs. Holland	March 20, 2021	5	5:00	Las Vegas, Nevada, United States	
Win	21–7	Edmen Shahbazyan	TKO (punches)	UFC Fight Night: Brunson vs. Shahbazyan	August 1, 2020	3	0:26	Las Vegas, Nevada, United States	
Win	20–7	Ian Heinisch	Decision (unanimous)	UFC 241	August 17, 2019	3	5:00	Anaheim, California, United States	
Win	19–7	Elias Theodorou	Decision (unanimous)	UFC Fight Night: Iaquinta vs. Cowboy	May 4, 2019	3	5:00	Ottawa, Ontario, Canada	
Loss	18–7	Israel Adesanya	TKO (knees and punches)	UFC 230	November 3, 2018	1	4:51	New York City, New York, United States	
Loss	18–6	Ronaldo Souza	KO (head kick and punches)	UFC on Fox: Jacaré vs. Brunson 2	January 27, 2018	1	3:50	Charlotte, North Carolina, United States	
Win	18–5	Lyoto Machida	KO (punches)	UFC Fight Night: Brunson vs. Machida	October 28, 2017	1	2:30	São Paulo, Brazil	Performance of the Night.
Win	17–5	Dan Kelly	KO (punch)	UFC Fight Night: Lewis vs. Hunt	June 11, 2017	1	1:16	Auckland, New Zealand	
Loss	16–5	Anderson Silva	Decision (unanimous)	UFC 208	February 11, 2017	3	5:00	Brooklyn, New York, United States	
Loss	16–4	Robert Whittaker	TKO (head kick and punches)	UFC Fight Night: Whittaker vs. Brunson	November 27, 2016	1	4:07	Melbourne, Australia	Fight of the Night.
Win	16–3	Uriah Hall	TKO (punch)	UFC Fight Night: Poirier vs. Johnson	September 17, 2016	1	1:41	Hidalgo, Texas, United States	
Win	15–3	Roan Carneiro	KO (punches)	UFC Fight Night: Cowboy vs. Cowboy	February 21, 2016	1	2:38	Pittsburgh, Pennsylvania, United States	
Win	14–3	Sam Alvey	TKO (punches)	UFC Fight Night: Teixeira vs. Saint Preux	August 8, 2015	1	2:19	Nashville, Tennessee, United States	
Win	13–3	Ed Herman	TKO (punches)	UFC 183	January 31, 2015	1	0:36	Las Vegas, Nevada, United States	
Win	12–3	Lorenz Larkin	Decision (unanimous)	UFC 177	August 30, 2014	3	5:00	Sacramento, California, United States	
Loss	11–3	Yoel Romero	TKO (punches and elbows)	UFC Fight Night: Rockhold vs. Philippou	January 15, 2014	3	3:23	Duluth, Georgia, United States	Fight of the Night.
Win	11–2	Brian Houston	Submission (rear-naked choke)	UFC: Fight for the Troops 3	November 6, 2013	1	0:48	Fort Campbell, Kentucky, United States	
Win	10–2	Chris Leben	Decision (unanimous)	UFC 155	December 29, 2012	3	5:00	Las Vegas, Nevada, United States	
Loss	9–2	Ronaldo Souza	KO (punches)	Strikeforce: Rousey vs. Kaufman	August 18, 2012	1	0:41	San Diego, California, United States	
Loss	9–1	Kendall Grove	Decision (split)	ShoFight 20	June 16, 2012	3	5:00	Springfield, Missouri, United States	For the ShoFight Middleweight Championship; Brunson missed weight (190 lb) and was ineligible to win the title.
Win	9–0	Nate James	Decision (unanimous)	Strikeforce Challengers: Britt vs. Sayers	November 18, 2011	3	5:00	Las Vegas, Nevada, United States	
Win	8–0	Lumumba Sayers	Submission (rear-naked choke)	Strikeforce: Fedor vs. Henderson	July 30, 2011	1	4:33	Hoffman Estates, Illinois, United States	
Win	7–0	Jeremy Hamilton	Decision (unanimous)	Strikeforce Challengers: Fodor vs. Terry	June 24, 2011	3	5:00	Kent, Washington, United States	
Win	6–0	Danny Babcock	KO (punch)	World Extreme Fighting 45	January 22, 2011	1	1:07	Jacksonville, Florida, United States	
Win	5–0	Rhomez Brower	TKO (submission to punches)	XFP: The Holiday Fight Fest	December 4, 2010	1	2:27	Wilmington, North Carolina, United States	
Win	4–0	Todd Chattelle	TKO (punches)	ICE: Fright Night 2010	October 29, 2010	1	0:14	Providence, Rhode Island, United States	
Win	3–0	Edward Jackson	KO (punches)	Carolina's Summer Fight Series 3	July 31, 2010	1	0:41	Jacksonville, North Carolina, United States	
Win	2–0	Chris McNally	KO (punches)	Carolina's Summer Fight Series 2	June 26, 2010	1	1:42	Wilmington, North Carolina, United States	
Win	1–0	John Bryant	Submission (rear-naked choke)	Carolina's Summer Fight Series 1	May 22, 2010	1	0:52	Wilmington, North Carolina, United States	

== Bare knuckle boxing record ==
Professional record breakdown
1 match	1 win	0 losses
By knockout	1	0

Res.	Record	Opponent	Method	Event	Date	Round	Time	Location	Notes
Win	1–0	Theo Doukas	TKO (punches)	BKFC Fight Night Myrtle Beach: Richardson vs. Oxendine	November 20, 2026	2	0:36	Myrtle Beach, South Carolina, United States	Bare knuckle debut.

== NCAA record ==
NCAA Division II Championships Matches
Res.	Record	Opponent	Score	Date	Event
2007 NCAA (DII) Championships 7th at 197 lbs
Win	9-9	Kelsey Empting	8-2	March 9–10, 2007	2007 NCAA Division II Wrestling Championships
Loss	8-9	Heath Jolley	Fall	March 9–10, 2007	2007 NCAA Division II Wrestling Championships
Win	8-8	Chris Taylor	6-2	March 9–10, 2007	2007 NCAA Division II Wrestling Championships
Win	7-8	Jacob Marrs	12-7	March 9–10, 2007	2007 NCAA Division II Wrestling Championships
Loss	6-8	Josh Majerus	Fall	March 9–10, 2007	2007 NCAA Division II Wrestling Championships
2005 NCAA (DII) Championships 8th at 184 lbs
Loss	6-7	Don Ortega	3-5	March 11–12, 2005	2005 NCAA Division II Wrestling Championships
Loss	6-6	Kristopher Klepacz	Fall	March 11–12, 2005	2005 NCAA Division II Wrestling Championships
Win	6-5	Dillon Blackman	Fall	March 11–12, 2005	2005 NCAA Division II Wrestling Championships
Loss	5-5	Clint Carmony	5-8	March 11–12, 2005	2005 NCAA Division II Wrestling Championships
Win	5-4	Todd Naasz	12-5	March 11–12, 2005	2005 NCAA Division II Wrestling Championships
2004 NCAA (DII) Championships DNP at 184 lbs
Loss	4-4	Corey Jacoby	TB-1 1-2	March 12–13, 2004	2004 NCAA Division II Wrestling Championships
Win	4-3	Matt Trout	MD 16-6	March 12–13, 2004	2004 NCAA Division II Wrestling Championships
Loss	3-3	Greg Nurrenbern	4-10	March 12–13, 2004	2004 NCAA Division II Wrestling Championships
2003 NCAA (DII) Championships 4th at 184 lbs
Loss	3-2	Jeff Henning	TF 2-18	March 14–15, 2003	2003 NCAA Division II Wrestling Championships
Win	3-1	Ben McAvinew	10-5	March 14–15, 2003	2003 NCAA Division II Wrestling Championships
Loss	2-1	Mauricio Wright	5-11	March 14–15, 2003	2003 NCAA Division II Wrestling Championships
Win	2-0	Sam Kenton	5-3	March 14–15, 2003	2003 NCAA Division II Wrestling Championships
Win	1-0	Ben Holscher	11-5	March 14–15, 2003	2003 NCAA Division II Wrestling Championships

== See also ==
- List of current PFL fighters
- List of male mixed martial artists
