= UFC 155 =

UFC mixed martial arts event in 2012

UFC 155: dos Santos vs. Velasquez 2
- The poster for UFC 155: dos Santos vs. Velasquez 2
- Promotion: Ultimate Fighting Championship
- Date: December 29, 2012
- Venue: MGM Grand Garden Arena
- City: Las Vegas, Nevada
- Attendance: 13,561
- Total gate: $3,286,025
- Buyrate: 590,000

Event chronology
The Ultimate Fighter: Team Carwin vs. Team Nelson Finale	UFC 155: dos Santos vs. Velasquez 2	UFC on FX: Belfort vs. Bisping

UFC 155: dos Santos vs. Velasquez 2 was a mixed martial arts event held by the Ultimate Fighting Championship on December 29, 2012, at the MGM Grand Garden Arena in Las Vegas, Nevada.

== Background ==
A Junior dos Santos vs. Cain Velasquez rematch had been expected since May 26, 2012 at UFC 146, where dos Santos defended his Heavyweight championship against Frank Mir and Velasquez defeated Antônio Silva. Velasquez and dos Santos had already fought once on November 12, 2011 at UFC on Fox: Velasquez vs. Dos Santos, where dos Santos won via knockout in the first round. Alistair Overeem, former DREAM and Strikeforce champion, was expected to face the winner of this bout. He was originally expected to face dos Santos for the title at UFC 146; however, on April 4, 2012, Overeem was revealed to have failed his pre-fight drug test by the Nevada State Athletic Commission (NSAC). He was found to have an elevated testosterone to epitestosterone ratio of 14-to-1, over the allowed ratio rate of 6-to-1.

Chael Sonnen was expected to face Forrest Griffin at this event. However, Sonnen was pulled from the fight to coach the seventeenth season of The Ultimate Fighter opposite UFC Light Heavyweight champion Jon Jones and was replaced by Phil Davis. Griffin was then forced out of the bout with a knee injury and Davis was pulled from the card altogether.

A bout between Erik Koch and Ricardo Lamas was expected to take place at this event. However, the bout was moved to UFC on Fox 6 and promoted to the main card.

Gray Maynard was expected to face Joe Lauzon at this event. However, Maynard was forced out of the bout with an injury and replaced by Jim Miller.

Matt Mitrione was expected to face Phil De Fries at this event. However, due to an injury sustained by Shane Carwin, Mitrione stepped in as a replacement against Roy Nelson at The Ultimate Fighter 16 Finale and was replaced by the returning Todd Duffee.

Chris Weidman was expected to face Tim Boetsch at this event. However, Weidman was forced out of the bout with a shoulder injury and was replaced by Costas Philippou.

Karlos Vemola was expected to face Chris Leben at this event. However, Vemola was forced out of the bout with an injury and was replaced by Strikeforce veteran Derek Brunson.

Cody McKenzie was expected to face Leonard Garcia at this event. However, McKenzie was forced out of the bout and was replaced by Max Holloway.

A bout between Melvin Guillard and Jamie Varner, originally scheduled for The Ultimate Fighter 16 Finale, was rescheduled for this event after Varner fell ill the night of the event.

== Results ==
Main Card
Weight class				Method	Round	Time	Notes
Heavyweight	Cain Velasquez	def.	Junior dos Santos (c)	Decision (unanimous) (50–45, 50–43, 50–44)	5	5:00	(Note: For the UFC Heavyweight Championship.)
Lightweight	Jim Miller	def.	Joe Lauzon	Decision (unanimous) (29–28, 29–28, 29–28)	3	5:00
Middleweight	Costas Philippou	def.	Tim Boetsch	TKO (punches)	3	2:11
Middleweight	Yushin Okami	def.	Alan Belcher	Decision (unanimous) (30–27, 29–28, 30–27)	3	5:00
Middleweight	Derek Brunson	def.	Chris Leben	Decision (unanimous) (29–28, 29–28, 29–28)	3	5:00
Preliminary Card (FX)
Bantamweight	Eddie Wineland	def.	Brad Pickett	Decision (split) (30–27, 28–29, 30–27)	3	5:00
Bantamweight	Erik Pérez	def.	Byron Bloodworth	TKO (punches)	1	3:50
Lightweight	Jamie Varner	def.	Melvin Guillard	Decision (split) (30–27, 27–30, 30–27)	3	5:00
Lightweight	Myles Jury	def.	Michael Johnson	Decision (unanimous) (30–27, 30–27, 30–27)	3	5:00
Preliminary Card (Facebook and YouTube)
Heavyweight	Todd Duffee	def.	Phil De Fries	TKO (punches)	1	2:04
Featherweight	Max Holloway	def.	Leonard Garcia	Decision (split) (29–28, 28–29, 29–28)	3	5:00
Flyweight	John Moraga	def.	Chris Cariaso	Submission (guillotine choke)	3	1:11

== Bonus awards ==
The following fighters received $65,000 bonuses.

- Fight of the Night: Jim Miller vs. Joe Lauzon
- Knockout of the Night: Todd Duffee
- Submission of the Night: John Moraga

== Reported payout ==
The following is the reported payout to the fighters as reported to the Nevada State Athletic Commission. It does not include sponsor money and also does not include the UFC's traditional "fight night" bonuses.

- Cain Velasquez: $200,000 (includes $100,000 win bonus) def. Junior dos Santos: $400,000
- Jim Miller: $82,000 (includes $41,000 win bonus) def. Joe Lauzon: $27,000
- Costas Philippou: $36,000 (includes $18,000 win bonus) def. Tim Boetsch: $37,000
- Yushin Okami: $84,000 (includes $42,000 win bonus) def. Alan Belcher: $37,000
- Derek Brunson: $30,000 (includes $15,000 win bonus) def. Chris Leben: $51,000
- Eddie Wineland: $30,000 (includes $15,000 win bonus) def. Brad Pickett: $17,000
- Érik Pérez: $20,000 (includes $10,000 win bonus) def. Byron Bloodworth: $6,000
- Jamie Varner: $24,000 (includes $12,000 win bonus) def. Melvin Guillard: $42,000
- Myles Jury: $16,000 (includes $8,000 win bonus) def. Michael Johnson: $14,000
- Todd Duffee: $16,000 (includes $8,000 win bonus) def. Phil De Fries: $8,000
- Max Holloway: $24,000 (includes $12,000 win bonus) def. Leonard Garcia: $20,000
- John Moraga: $22,000 (includes $11,000 win bonus) def. Chris Cariaso: $12,000

== See also ==
- List of UFC events
- 2012 in UFC
