= Colton Smith (fighter) =

American mixed martial artist

- Born: August 14, 1987 (age 39); Ankeny, Iowa, U.S.
- Height: 6 ft 0 in (1.83 m)
- Weight: 170 lb (77 kg; 12 st)
- Division: Lightweight; Welterweight
- Reach: 71 in (180 cm)
- Rank: Black belt in Brazilian Jiu-Jitsu under Matt Larsen
- Years active: 2011–2018

Mixed martial arts record
- Total: 12
- Wins: 7
- By knockout: 1
- By submission: 2
- By decision: 4
- Losses: 5
- By knockout: 2
- By submission: 2
- By decision: 1

Amateur record
- Total: 6
- Wins: 5
- By knockout: 2
- By submission: 3
- Losses: 1

Other information
- Mixed martial arts record from Sherdog
- Military career
- Branch: United States Army
- Rank: Sergeant first class
- Unit: 3d Cavalry Regiment
- Conflicts: Iraq War; Afghan War

Colton Smith (born August 14, 1987) is an American former mixed martial artist who competed in the Lightweight division of the Ultimate Fighting Championship. Smith is best known for competing on, and winning The Ultimate Fighter: Team Carwin vs. Team Nelson.

His dominant wrestling style allowed him to defeat all five fighters he faced in the tournament by decision. He is currently an active member of the U.S. Army.

== Early life ==
Smith started wrestling at an early age. During high school, Smith wrestled for Ankeny High School at 145 pounds. Smith graduated high school in 2005 and enlisted in the Army.

== Army career ==
Smith, a Combat infantry soldier, earned airborne, ranger, and sapper tabs and has served tours in Iraq, Syria, Jordan and Afghanistan. While assigned to Echo Company, 4th Battalion, 3rd Infantry Regiment (Old Guard), Smith earned his Expert Infantryman Badge. Smith currently serves as the chief Combatives Instructor at III Corps and Fort Hood. Smith has since been selected for promotion to Sergeant First Class and expects to refocus on Army training. The Army Times admitted, after criticizing Smith's recent MMA performances, that they received backlash from their vocal readership indicating Smith's popularity among fellow servicemembers.

== Mixed martial arts career ==
=== Early career ===
Smith started his career with a 2–1 record, including a win in M-1 Challenge. Smith trained Brazilian Jiujitsu under Relson Gracie earning his purple belt and developed his MMA skill under Lloyd Irvin and Vanguard Gym in Manassas, Virginia.

=== The Ultimate Fighter ===
Smith was selected as a cast member for The Ultimate Fighter: Team Carwin vs. Team Nelson. He had to receive special permission in order to participate in the reality series during active duty. In the elimination fight in order to get into the house, Smith defeated Jesse Barrett by unanimous decision. Smith was the subject of controversy for putting his hand out to touch gloves, but faking and immediately shooting for a take down.

In his first fight inside the house, Smith won a majority decision over Eddie Ellis.

In the quarterfinal round Smith won another decision over Igor Araujo to advance to the semifinal round.

In the semifinals, Smith advanced to the finals with a unanimous decision win over Jon Manley.

=== Ultimate Fighting Championship ===
Smith made his official UFC debut on December 15, 2012 at The Ultimate Fighter: Team Carwin vs. Team Nelson Finale against Mike Ricci. Smith won the fight via unanimous decision to become the Ultimate Fighter 16 winner.

Smith faced Robert Whittaker on May 25, 2013 at UFC 160. He lost the fight by TKO in the third round.

Smith next faced Michael Chiesa in a lightweight bout on November 6, 2013 at UFC Fight Night 31. He was defeated via rear naked choke in the second round.

Smith faced promotional newcomer Carlos Diego Ferreira on June 28, 2014 at UFC Fight Night: Swanson vs. Stephens. He lost the fight via a modified rear-naked choke submission, and was released from the promotion shortly after.

=== Post-UFC ===
Eight months after his last UFC fight, Smith returned to compete on the local circuit where he picked up two victories in the Rocks Xtreme MMA promotion.

=== World Series of Fighting ===
On August 20, 2015 it was announced that Smith signed with the World Series of Fighting. He made his eventual debut on October 17, 2015 at WSOF 24 against Washington Da Silva. He won the fight via unanimous decision.

=== Grappling ===
On July 22, 2013, Colton Smith competed in a no gi super fight against Carlos Diego Ferreira at the American Grappling Federation's Southern Regionals. Ferreira won the match by points.

He is scheduled to headline “Heroes on the Mat,” grappling organization show, June 28, 2026, in Manassas, Virginia.

== Personal life ==
Smith has three children.

He runs his own MMA gym, Enlisted Nine Fight Company, in Fredericksburg, Stafford County, Virginia and fledging lifestyle brand Enlisted Nine Fight Company partnered with Veteran Clothing giant, NineLine Apparel.

He is a third degree black belt under John Ouanno of Tsunami Jiu Jitsu.

== Accomplishments ==
- Ultimate Fighting Championship
  - Ultimate Fighter 16 Winner
  - The Ultimate Fighter 16 Fight of the Season

== Mixed martial arts record ==
Professional record breakdown
12 matches	7 wins	5 losses
By knockout	2	2
By submission	1	2
By decision	4	1

Res.	Record	Opponent	Method	Event	Date	Round	Time	Location	Notes
Loss	7–5	Sean Brady	Decision (unanimous)	Shogun Fights: Florida	March 17, 2018	3	5:00	Hollywood, Florida, United States	For the Shogun Fights Welterweight Championship.
Win	7–4	Joseph Valadez	Decision (unanimous)	OCFN: Honoring America's Warriors	April 30, 2016	3	5:00	Weatherford, Oklahoma, United States	
Win	6–4	Washington Da Silva	Decision (unanimous)	WSOF 24	October 17, 2015	3	5:00	Mashantucket, Connecticut, United States	
Win	5–4	Marcus Andrusla	TKO (punches)	Rocks Xtreme MMA 14	May 16, 2015	1	2:35	Harker Heights, Texas, United States	Return to Welterweight.
Win	4–4	Evan Cutts	Decision (unanimous)	Rocks Xtreme MMA 12	February 28, 2015	3	5:00	Harker Heights, Texas, United States	Catchweight (165 lbs) bout.
Loss	3–4	Carlos Diego Ferreira	Submission (rear-naked choke)	UFC Fight Night: Swanson vs. Stephens	June 28, 2014	1	0:38	San Antonio, Texas, United States	
Loss	3–3	Michael Chiesa	Submission (rear-naked choke)	UFC: Fight for the Troops 3	November 6, 2013	2	1:41	Fort Campbell, Kentucky, United States	Lightweight debut.
Loss	3–2	Robert Whittaker	TKO (punches)	UFC 160	May 25, 2013	3	0:41	Las Vegas, Nevada, United States	
Win	3–1	Mike Ricci	Decision (unanimous)	The Ultimate Fighter 16 Finale	December 15, 2012	3	5:00	Las Vegas, Nevada, United States	Won The Ultimate Fighter 16 Welterweight Tournament.
Loss	2–1	Steve Montgomery	KO (punch)	Championship Fighting Alliance 5	February 24, 2012	2	0:08	Coral Gables, Florida, United States	
Win	2–0	Walter Coles	TKO (submission to punches)	Demolition Combat	October 29, 2011	1	1:52	Winchester, Virginia, United States	
Win	1–0	Brian Nielson	Submission (rear-naked choke)	M-1 Challenge 24: Damkovsky vs. Figueroa	March 25, 2011	1	4:19	Norfolk, Virginia, United States	

=== Mixed martial arts exhibition record ===
Exhibition record breakdown		
4 matches	4 wins	0 losses
By decision	4	0

Res.	Record	Opponent	Method	Event	Date	Round	Time	Location	Notes
Win	4–0	Jon Manley	Decision (unanimous)	The Ultimate Fighter: Team Carwin vs. Team Nelson		3	5:00	Las Vegas, Nevada, United States	Semi-Final round
Win	3–0	Igor Araujo	Decision (unanimous)	The Ultimate Fighter: Team Carwin vs. Team Nelson		2	5:00	Las Vegas, Nevada, United States	Quarter-Final round
Win	2–0	Eddy Ellis	Decision (Majority)	The Ultimate Fighter: Team Carwin vs. Team Nelson		2	5:00	Las Vegas, Nevada, United States	Preliminary round
Win	1–0	Jesse Barrett	Decision (unanimous)	The Ultimate Fighter: Team Carwin vs. Team Nelson		2	5:00	Las Vegas, Nevada, United States	Elimination round

== Amateur mixed martial arts record ==
Amateur record breakdown		
6 matches	5 wins	1 loss
By knockout	2	0
By submission	3	0
By decision	0	1

Res.	Record	Opponent	Method	Event	Date	Round	Time	Location	Notes
Win	5–1	Gary Wilkins	TKO (punches)	Barbarian Fight Club - 2011 Matinee	January 15, 2011	1	1:57	Fredericksburg, Virginia, United States	
Loss	4–1	Chad Malone	Decision (split)	Operation Octagon 11	June 26, 2010	3	5:00	Sterling, Virginia, United States	
Win	4–0	William Bookwalter	Submission (rear-naked choke)	Operation Octagon 9	November 7, 2009	1	4:29	Sterling, Virginia, United States	
Win	3–0	Jarreau Mobley	Submission (rear-naked choke)	Operation Octagon 8	August 15, 2009	1	1:33	Manassas, Virginia, United States	
Win	2–0	Cody Toy	Submission (anaconda choke)	Operation Octagon 5	December 6, 2008	1	2:42	Manassas, Virginia, United States	
Win	1–0	Rob Wine	TKO (punches)	Gladiator Fight Club 2 - Call to Glory	January 12, 2008	1	0:52	Winchester, Virginia, United States	
