= 2015 in BRACE =

Mixed martial arts events

Information
- First date: March 20, 2015
- Last date: November 21, 2015

Events
- Total events: 5

Fights
- Total fights: 37
- Title fights: 3

Chronology
2014 in BRACE	2015 in BRACE	2016 in BRACE

The year 2015 was the seventh year in the history of BRACE, a mixed martial arts promotion based in Australia. In 2015 Brace held 6 events.

== Events list ==
#	Event Title	Date	Arena	Location
37	Brace 37	November 21, 2015	AIS Arena	Canberra, Australia
36	Brace 36	September 19, 2015	Big Top Luna Park	Sydney, Australia
event cancelled	Brace 35	July 17, 2015	Southport Sharks	Gold Coast, Australia, Australia
35	Brace 34	May 23, 2015	AIS Arena	Canberra, Australia
34	Brace 33	April 18, 2015	Panthers	Newcastle, Australia
33	Brace 32	March 20, 2015	Big Top Luna Park	Sydney, Australia

== Brace 37 ==
Brace 37 was an event held on November 21, 2015, at AIS Arena in Canberra, Australia.

=== Results ===
Main Card
Weight class				Method	Round	Time	Notes
Featherweight	Jamie Mullarkey	def.	Greg Criticos	Submission (rear-naked choke)	2	3:01	(Note: For Brace featherweight championship)
Welterweight	Ben Alloway	def.	Theo Christakos	TKO (punches)	3	1:28	(Note: For Brace welterweight championship)
Lightweight	Damien Brown	def.	Ben Games	Submission (rear-naked choke)	2	1:57	(Note: For Brace lightweight championship)
Bantamweight	Stefan Rosa	NC	Mark Baskin	NC (knee to head of grounded fighter)	1	2:49	(Note: For Brace bantamweight championship; bout ended with No Contest (knee to head of grounded fighter))
Welterweight	Rick Alchin	def.	Steve Micallef	LP (punch)	1	0:53
Catchweight	Kieran Joblin	def.	Oriol Gaset	TKO (doctor stoppaged)	1	2:51	(Note: Catchweight bout for 160Ibs)
Preliminary Card
Welterweight	James O’Brien	def.	Jamie Carl	TKO (punches)	1	1:18
Middleweight	Stephen Owens	def.	Chris Bowler	TKO (punches)	1	3:47
Middleweight	David Francis	def.	Jasper Dunphy	TKO (arm injury)	1	0:59
Welterweight	Byron Sanders	def.	Luke Kensey	TKO (punches)	2	0:42

== Brace 36 ==
Brace 36 was an event held on November 19, 2015, at Big Top Luna Park in Sydney, Australia.

=== Results ===
Main Card
Weight class				Method	Round	Time	Notes
Lightweight	Damien Brown	def.	Abel Brites	Submission (guillotine choke)	1	0:17
Featherweight	Jamie Mullarkey	def.	David Simmons	TKO (punches)	1	2:47
Welterweight	Benny Alloway	def.	Rick Alchin	Submission (guillotine choke)	2	3:03
Lightweight	Ben Games	def.	Ali Cevik	Decision (unanimous)	3	5:00
Bantamweight	Mark Baskin	def.	Bowen Cornish	Submission (rear naked choke)	1	2:06
Bantamweight	Janay Harding	def.	Jess Doueihi	TKO (punches)	1	1:26
Welterweight	Theo Christakos	def.	Tom Kingston	Submission (rear-naked choke)	1	2:41

== Brace 34 ==
Brace 34 was an event held on May 23, 2015, at AIS Arena in Canberra, Australia.

=== Results ===
Main Card
Weight class				Method	Round	Time	Notes
Bantamweight	Peter Cross	def.	Stee McKinnon	Submission (anaconda choke)	1	1:19
Strawweight	Alessia Espinosa-Vallve	def.	Natalie Gonzales Hills	KO (punch)	3	2:00
Lightweight	Paul Franchi	def.	Adam Oxenbridge	TKO (punches and elbows)	2	1:15
Welterweight	Tom Kingston	def.	Dimitar Dimitrovski	TKO (punches)	2	2:16
N/A	Jess Doueihi	def.	Roxey Kelly	Submission (rear-naked choke)	1	1:46
Middleweight	David Francis	def.	Reza Almasi	TKO (punches)	1	3:50

== Brace 33 ==
Brace 33 was an event held on April 18, 2015, at Panters in Newcastle, Australia.

=== Results ===
Main Card
Weight class				Method	Round	Time	Notes
Featherweight	Jamie Mullarkey	def.	Stefan Rosa	Submission (rear-naked choke)	1	4:13
Welterweight	Rick Alchin	def.	Chad Price	Submission (rear-naked choke)	2	1:35
Lightweight	Ben Games	def.	Adam Oxenbridge	TKO (punches)	1	0:51
Bantamweight	Anthony Fogus	def.	Bown Cornish	Decision (unanimous)	3	5:00
Featherweight	Simon Arentz	def.	Josh Oxenbridge	Submission (armbar)	3	0:44
Welterweight	Saeid Fatahi	def.	tom Kingston	Decision (unanimous)	3	5:00

== Brace 32 ==
Brace 32 was an event held on March 20, 2015, at Big Top Luna Park, in Sydney, Australia.

=== Results ===
Main Card
Weight class				Method	Round	Time	Notes
Welterweight	Manuel Rodriguez	def.	Steve Micallef	TKO (elbows and punches)	1	1:43
Welterweight	Theo Christakos	def.	Regan Wilson	Submission (rear-naked choke)	2	4:49
Lightweight	Albel Brites	def.	Adam Trickey	Submission (rear-naked choke)	1	4:30
N/A	Mark Baskin	def.	Tom Cruz	Decision (unanimous)	3	5:00
Strawweight	Claire Todd	def.	Natalie Gonzales	TKO (punches)	3	3:39
Featherweight	Josh Payne	def.	Chris Drummond	Decision (split)	3	5:00
Lightweight	Ali Cevik	def.	Luke Martin	Decision (unanimous)	3	5:00
Featherweight	Greg Criticos	def.	Matt Darke	Submission (rear-naked choke)	1	3:02
Middleweight	Andrew Mills	def.	David Francis	Submission (rear-naked choke)	1	4:44
