= 2013 in BRACE =

Mixed martial arts events

Information
- First date: February 16, 2013
- Last date: December 21, 2013

Events
- Total events: 7

Fights
- Total fights: 49
- Title fights: 3

Chronology
2012 in BRACE	2013 in BRACE	2014 in BRACE

The year 2013 was the fifth year in the history of BRACE, a mixed martial arts promotion based in Australia. In 2013 BRACE held 7 events.

== Events list ==
#	Event title	Date	Arena	Location
24	BRACE 25	December 21, 2013	North Sydney Leagues Club	Sydney, Australia
23	BRACE 24	November 29, 2013	AIS Arena	Canberra, Australia
22	BRACE 23	October 26, 2013	Townsville Entertainment Centre	Townsville, Australia
21	BRACE 22	September 21, 2013	North Sydney Leagues Club	Sydney, Australia
20	BRACE 21	July 20, 2013	North Sydney Leagues Club	Sydney, Australia
19	BRACE 20	May 25, 2013	Broncos Leagues	Brisbane, Australia
18	BRACE 19	February 16, 2013	Big Top Luna Park	Sydney, Australia

== BRACE 25 ==
BRACE 25 was an event held on December 21, 2013, at North Sydney Leagues Club in Sydney, Australia.

=== Results ===
Main Card
Weight class				Method	Round	Time	Notes
Lightweight	Mathew Darke	def.	Will Swann	Decision (split)	3	5:00
Middleweight	Andrew Mills	def.	Mehdi Rahimi	Decision (majority)	N/A	N/A
Heavyweight	Mark Elworthy	def.	Karl King	TKO (punches)	1	2:57
Lightweight	Michael	def.	Joel Champman-Mortimer	Decision (unanimous)	N/A	N/A
Featherweight	Geo Ellahi	def.	dave Lindsay	Submission (rear-naked choke)	2	0:58
Featherweight	Dean madison	def.	Darwin Sagurit	Decision (unanimous)	N/A	N/A

== BRACE 24 ==
BRACE 24 was an event held on November 29, 2013, at AIS Arena in Canberra, Australia.

=== Results ===
Main Card
Weight class				Method	Round	Time	Notes
Featherweight	Martin Nguyen	def.	Luke Standing	TKO (punches)	1	3:30	(Note: For BRACE featherweight championship)
Lightweight	Kevin Manderson	def.	Jacob Pettett	Decision (unanimous)	3	5:00
Welterweight	Dimitar Dimitrovski	def.	Craig Bath	submission 9rear-naked choke)	1	2:00
Lightweight	Amarbir Singh	def.	Mathew Darke	Submission (guillotine choke)	1	3:05
Featherweight	Peter Cross	def.	Darwin Sagurit	Submission (rear-naked choke)	1	3:23
Featherweight	Steve McKinnon	def.	Bao Ho	Submission (rear-naked choke)	2	1:55
Featherweight	Jeshua McPail	def.	Aam Corbett	Submission (rear-naked choke)	2	1:55
Middleweight	Kitt Campbell	def.	Talha Taslak	TKO	1	2:39

== BRACE 23 ==
BRACE 23 was an event held on October 26, 2013, at Townsville Entertainment Centre in Townsville, Australia.

=== Results ===
Main Card
Weight class				Method	Round	Time	Notes
Lightweight	Gokhan Turkyilmaz	def.	Kevin Manderson	TKO (punches)	1	0:26
Bantamweight	Edwin Arana	def.	Zach Hook	Decision (majority)	3	5:00
Featherweight	Jamie Mullarkey	def.	Luke Hume	KO (elbows)	1	4:59
Featherweight	J.J. Van Aswegen	def.	Kris Spence	Submisiion (rear-naked choke)	3	2:01
Lightweight	Taela kelly	def.	Mick Bosworth	TKO (punches)	1	4:10
Middleweight	Eddie Trewin	def.	Paul Cavacus	KO (punch)	1	0:14
Lightweight	Ben Games	def.	Craig Callaghan	TKO (punches)	2	4:02
Middleweight	Matt Eland	def.	James Fa’aso	Submission (guillotine choke)	1	1:35

== BRACE 22 ==
BRACE 22 was an event held on September 21, 2013, at Norths LeaguesLeagues in Sydney, Australia.

=== Results ===
Main Card
Weight class				Method	Round	Time	Notes
Featherweight	J.J. Van Aswegen	def.	Adam Corbett	Submission (triangle hoke)	1	1:00
Light Heavyweight	Randall Rayment	def.	Ben Wrotniak	Submission (rear-naked choke)	1	0:48
Middleweight	Karl Robertson	def.	Lauuli Faatmala	Submission (rear-naked choke)	2	0:00
Featherweight	Jeshua McPhail	def.	Josep Logronio	Submission (rear-naked choke)	1	1:38
Featherweight	Dean Madison	def.	Geo Ellahi	Decision (unanimous)	3	3:00
Welterweight	Matthew Moore	def.	Jared Schouten	KO (punch)	1	0:07
Lightweight	Danny Hooper	def.	Sam Atkinson	Submission (rear-naked choke)	2	2:05
Welterweight	Aiden Meaney	def.	Adam Ellanor	TKO (punches)	1	0:25

== BRACE 21 ==
BRACE 21 was an event held on July 20, 2013, at North Sydney Leagues Club in Sydney, Australia.

=== Results ===
Main Card
Weight class				Method	Round	Time	Notes
Middleweight	Billy Mcaless	def.	Gerhard Voigh	TKO (punches)	1	2:40
Bantamweight	Mark Baskin	def.	Giancarlo Embradora	Decision (unanimous)	3	5:00
Featherweight	Martin Nguyen	def.	Jamie Mullarkey	Decision (majority)	3	3:00
Lightweight	Will Swann	def.	Darwin Sagurit	Submission (guillotine choke)	2	0:46
Welterweight	Craig Bath	def.	Adam Washbourne	KO	1	0:25
Light Heavyweight	Francis Gullimore	def.	Harry Grech	TKO (punches	1	2:07

== BRACE 20 ==
BRACE 20 was an event held on May 25, 2013, at Broncos Leagues in Brisbane, Australia.

=== Results ===
Main Card
Weight class				Method	Round	Time	Notes
Heavyweight	Chris Lokteff	def.	Andrew Machin	Submission (kimura)	1	3:45
Lightweight	Greg Atzori	def.	Sonny Brown	TKO (punches)	1	2:33
Lightweight	Sam Bastin	def.	Rob Hill	TKO (punches)	2	4:01
Preliminary Card
Featherweight	Arlene Blencowe	def.	Kerry Barrett	Decision (split)	3	5:00
Featherweight	Riley Mallett	def.	Peter Cross	Submission (kimura)	2	2:01

== BRACE 19 ==
BRACE 19 was an event held on February 16, 2013, at Big Top Luna Park in Sydney, Australia.

=== Results ===
Main Card
Weight class				Method	Round	Time	Notes
Lightweight	Oriol Gaset	def.	Sonny Brown	TKO (punches)	1	2:31	(Note: For BRACE lightweight championship)
Welterweight	Corey Nelson	def.	Tony Rossini	TKO (kness and punches)	3	0:00	(Note: For BRACE welterweight championship)
Lightweight	Damien Brown	def.	Rob Hill	Decision (unanimous)	3	5:00
Welterweight	Jon Leven	def.	Ali Kocak Mohammed	Decision (unanimous)	3	5:00
Middleweight	Gerhard Voigt	def.	John Mitchell	TKO (punches)	2	4:44
Welterweight	Rick Alchin	def.	Marc Gehret	Submission (rear-naked choke)	1	3:11
Bantamweight	Amy Adam	def.	Belinda Sedgwick	Submission (punches)	1	1:17
Bantamweight	Mark Baskin	def.	Adam Corbett	TKO (punches)	2	2:01
