= Brace (MMA) =

Australian mixed martial arts (MMA) promotion based in Sydney

- Type: Private Company
- Industry: Mixed martial arts promotion
- Founded: 2005
- Founder: Kya Pate
- Headquarters: Sydney, Australia
- Key people: Kya Pate, Frank Barca, Jez Margosis
- Website: NONE

Brace (formerly known as Brace For War) was an Australian mixed martial arts (MMA) promotion. Brace was founded in 2005 by Kya Pate. In an interview with MMA Kanvas Kya Pate detailed what it is like to be the promoter of Australian MMA.

Since 2009 Brace has staged 50 events in 9 cities over 4 Australian States. After following the standard MMA format, in 2014 Brace changed to an elimination tournament format based on the style of AFL, NRL, A-League soccer. 8 Fighters per division compete in knock out elimination rounds all aiming to reach an end of season Grand Final event.

Brace follows the Unified Rules of Mixed Martial Arts.

== Broadcast partners ==
Brace is broadcast live on Network TEN exclusively in Australia and Fight Network based out of Canada

In November 2014, Brace signed a multi year multi event broadcast deal with Network TEN (a major Australian TV network), this is the first for any MMA event within Australia

UFC Fight Pass will begin streaming Brace MMA live events and the promotion’s fight library later in 2015.

== Current champions ==
| Division | Upper weight limit | Champion | Since | Title defenses |
|---|---|---|---|---|
| Light Heavyweight | 205 lb (93 kg; 14.6 st) | (Australia) Duke Didier | 9 April 2017 | 0 |
| Middleweight | 185 lb (84 kg; 13.2 st) | (Australia) Rob Wilkinson | 23 October 2015 | 1 |
| Welterweight | 170 lb (77 kg; 12 st) | (Australia) Theo Christakos | 26 November 2016 | 1 |
| Lightweight | 155 lb (70 kg; 11.1 st) | (Australia) Alex MacDonald | 26 November 2016 | 0 |
| Featherweight | 145 lb (66 kg; 10.4 st) | (Australia) Jamie Mullarkey | 6 November 2015 | 1 |
| Bantamweight | 135 lb (61 kg; 9.6 st) | (Australia) Jordan Lucas | 22 November 2014 | 0 |
| Women's Bantamweight | 135 lb (61 kg; 9.6 st) | (Australia) Rhiannon Thompson | 11 November 2017 | 0 |

== Past Events list ==
| # | Event title | Date | Arena | Location |
|---|---|---|---|---|
| 50 | Brace 51 | 11 November 2017 | AIS Arena | Canberra, Australia |
| 49 | Brace 50 | 28 October 2017 | Big Top Luna Park | Sydney, Australia |
| 48 | Brace 49 | 8 April 2017 | AIS Arena | Canberra, Australia |
| N/A | Brace 48 | N/A | N/A | N/A |
| 47 | Brace 47 | 18 March 2017 | Big Top Luna Park | Sydney, Australia |
| 46 | Brace 46 | 4 March 2017 | RSL Southport | Gold Coast, Australia, Australia |
| 45 | Brace 45 | 26 November 2016 | AIS Arena | Canberra, Australia |
| 44 | Brace 44 | 8 October 2016 | RSL Southport | Gold Coast, Australia, Australia |
| 43 | Brace 43 | 1 October 2016 | Cowles Stadium | Christchurch, New Zealand |
| 42 | Brace 42 | 13 August 2016 | AIS Arena | Canberra, Australia |
| 41 | Brace 41 | 17 June 2016 | Lincoln Events Centre | Christchurch, New Zealand |
| 40 | Brace 40 | 14 May 2016 | RSL Southport | Gold Coast, Australia, Australia |
| 39 | Brace 39 | 16 April 2016 | AIS Arena | Canberra, Australia |
| 38 | Brace 38 | 26 March 2016 | Big Top Luna Park | Sydney, Australia |
| 37 | Brace 37 | 21 November 2015 | AIS Arena | Canberra, Australia |
| 36 | Brace 36 | 19 September 2015 | Big Top Luna Park | Sydney, Australia |
| event cancelled | Brace 35 | 17 July 2015 | Southport Sharks | Gold Coast, Australia, Australia |
| 35 | Brace 34 | 23 May 2015 | AIS Arena | Canberra, Australia |
| 34 | Brace 33 | 18 April 2015 | Panthers | Newcastle, Australia |
| 33 | Brace 32 | 20 March 2015 | Big Top Luna Park | Sydney, Australia |
| 32 | Tournament Season 1 Final | 20 November 2014 | AIS Arena | Canberra, Australia |
| 31 | Brace Ascend 2 | 15 November 2014 | North Sydney Leagues Club | Sydney, Australia |
| 30 | Brace 30 | 20 September 2014 | AIS Arena | Newcastle, Australia |
| 29 | Brace 29 | 9 August 2014 | North Sydney Leagues Club | Sydney, Australia |
| 28 | Brace 28 | 8 August 2014 | North Sydney Leagues Club | Sydney, Australia |
| 27 | Brace 27 | 17 May 2014 | AIS Arena | Canberra, Australia |
| 26 | Brace Ascend 1 | 3 May 2014 | North Sydney Leagues Club | Sydney, Australia |
| 24 | Brace 25 | 21 December 2013 | North Sydney Leagues Club | Sydney, Australia |
| 23 | Brace 24 | 29 November 2013 | AIS Arena | Canberra, Australia |
| 22 | Brace 23 | 26 October 2013 | Townsville Entertainment Centre | Townsville, Australia |
| 21 | Brace 22 | 21 September 2013 | North Sydney Leagues Club | Sydney, Australia |
| 20 | Brace 21 | 20 July 2013 | North Sydney Leagues Club | Sydney, Australia |
| 19 | Brace 20 | 25 May 2013 | Broncos Leagues | Brisbane, Australia |
| 18 | Brace 19 | 16 February 2013 | Big Top Luna Park | Sydney, Australia |
| 17 | Brace 18 | 21 December 2012 | Convention Centre | Canberra, Australia |
| 16 | Brace 17 | 27 October 2012 | Southport RSL | Gold Coast, Australia |
| (event cancelled) | Brace 16 | 16 June 2012 | Southport RSL | Gold Coast, Australia |
| 15 | Brace 15 | 28 April 2012 | Ex-Services Bowling Club | Coffs Harbour, Australia |
| 14 | Brace 14 | 18 February 2012 | Convention Centre | Canberra, Australia |
| 13 | Brace 13 | 19 November 2011 | Townsville Entertainment Centre | Townsville, Australia |
| 12 | Brace 12 | 15 October 2011 | Derwent Entertainment Centre | Hobart, Australia |
| 11 | Brace 11 | 17 September 2011 | Chandler Theatre | Brisbane, Australia |
| 10 | Brace 10 | 27 August 2011 | Convention Centre | Canberra, Australia |
| 9 | Brace 9 | 4 June 2011 | Townsville Entertainment Centre | Townsville, Australia |
| 8 | Brace 8 | 30 April 2011 | Mansfield Tavern | Brisbane, Australia |
| 7 | Brace 7 | 15 January 2011 | Convention Centre | Canberra, Australia |
| 6 | Brace 6 | 13 November 2010 | Townsville Entertainment Centre | Townsville, Australia |
| 5 | Brace 5 | 14 August 2010 | Broncos Leagues | Brisbane, Australia |
| 4 | Brace 4 | 8 May 2010 | Townsville Entertainment Centre | Townsville, Australia |
| 3 | Brace 3 | 16 Jan 2010 | Jupiters Casino | Townsville, Australia |
| 2 | Brace 2 | 15 August 2009 | Broncos Leagues | Brisbane, Australia |
| 1 | Brace 1 | 27 March 2009 | Broncos Leagues | Brisbane, Australia |

== Notable alumni ==
- Bec Rawlings (UFC)
- Alex Chambers (UFC)
- Ben Alloway (UFC)
- Damien Brown (UFC)
- Richard Walsh(UFC)
