= 2016 in BRACE =

Mixed martial arts events

Information
- First date: March 26, 2016
- Last date: November 26, 2016

Events
- Total events: 8

Fights
- Total fights: 57
- Title fights: 3

Chronology
2015 in BRACE	2016 in BRACE	2017 in BRACE

The year 2016 was the eighth year in the history of BRACE, a mixed martial arts promotion based in Australia. In 2016 Brace held 8 events.

== Events list ==
#	Event Title	Date	Arena	Location
45	Brace 45	November 26, 2016	AIS Arena	Canberra, Australia
44	Brace 44	October 8, 2016	RSL Southport	Gold Coast, Australia, Australia
43	Brace 43	October 1, 2016	Cowles Stadium	Christchurch, New Zealand
42	Brace 42	August 13, 2016	AIS Arena	Canberra, Australia
41	Brace 41	June 17, 2016	Lincoln Events Centre	Christchurch, New Zealand
40	Brace 40	May 14, 2016	RSL Southport	Gold Coast, Australia, Australia
39	Brace 39	April 16, 2016	AIS Arena	Canberra, Australia
38	Brace 38	March 26, 2016	Big Top Luna Park	Sydney, Australia

== Brace 45 ==
Brace 45 was an event held on November 26, 2016, at AIS Arena in Canberra, Australia.

=== Results ===
Main Card
Weight class				Method	Round	Time	Notes
Welterweight	Theo Christakos	def.	Rick Alchin	TKO (punches)	1	4:37	(Note: For Brace welterweight championship)
Bantamweight	Darwin Sagurit	def.	Anthony Bynoe	Decision (unanimous)	3	5:00	(Note: For Brace bantamweight championship)
Lightweight	Alex MacDonald	def.	Anthony Bynoe	Decision (unanimous)	3	5:00	(Note: For Brace lightweight championship)
Bantamweight	Caitlin Mc Ewen	def.	Jess Doueihi	TKO (punches)	2	2:57
Middleweight	Cameron Rowston	def.	Reza Almasi	Submission (rear-naked choke)	1	3:44

== Brace 44 ==
Brace 44 was an event held on October 8, 2016, at RSL Southport in Gold Coast, Australia, Australia.

=== Results ===
Main Card
Weight class				Method	Round	Time	Notes
Catch weight (141 Ibs)	Michael Tobin	def.	Richie Ivory	Technical Submission (rear-naked choke)	1	4:59
Lightweight	Greg Atzori	def.	Ethan Duniam	Decision (unanimous)	3	5:00
Lightweight	Issac Hardman	def.	Sean Le Gourrierec	Ko (punches)	1	2:22
Bantamweight	Paul Loga	def.	Dalton Jenkins	TKO (punches)	1	4:35
Lightweight	Dan Ginnane	def.	Paul Traish	TKO (punches)	1	3:24
Welterweight	Joel Kendrick	def.	James Londrigan	Submission (guillotine choke)	2	2:26
Welterweight	Uriel Loutina	def.	Blake Sheppard	Decision (unanimous)	3	5:00
Light Heavyweight	Simon Carson	def.	Michael McDaniel	TKO (punches)	1	2:41

== Brace 43 ==
Brace 43 was an event held on October 1, 2016, at Cowles Stadium in Christchurch, New Zealand

=== Results ===
Main Card
Weight class				Method	Round	Time	Notes
Welterweight	B.J. Bland	def.	Renan Secco	Decision (unanimous)	3	5:00
Featherweight	Scott MacGregor	def.	Josh Henderson	TKO (kick to the body and punches)	1	0:36
Featherweight	Shane Young	def.	Siitia Leti	Decision (unanimous)	3	5:00
Lightweight	Pumau Campbell	def.	Taneira Terry	Decision (unanimous)	3	5:00
Middleweight	Chris O'Donoghue	def.	Eruera Piwari	TKO (punches)	2	2:04
Welterweight	Cole Davids	def.	Joe Van Duin	Decision (unanimous)	3	5:00
Welterweight	Sam Holdawa	def.	Lachlan Ekert	Submission (rear-naked choke)	1	3:32
Lightweight	Selby Devereux	def.	Iain Blade	TKO (punch)	2	0:48

== Brace 42 ==
Brace 42 was an event held on August 13, 2016, at AIS Arena, in Canberra, Australia.

=== Results ===
Main Card
Weight class				Method	Round	Time	Notes
Featherweight	Luke Catubig	def.	Jamie Mullarkey	TKO (elbows)	2	4:19
Welterweight	Rick Alchin	def.	Tristan Murphy	Decision (unanimous)	3	5:00
Welterweight	Sam Hayward	def.	Theo Christakos	Submission (armbar)	1	2:54
Lightweight	Anthony Bynoe	def.	Nurbolat Kuandyk	Decision (split)	3	5:00
Lightweight	Alex MacDonald	def.	Jesse Medina	Decision (unanimous)	3	5:00
Bantamweight	Darwin Sagurit	def.	Byron Cowell	TKO (punches)	1	2:30
Bantamweight	Richie Ivory	def.	Ben Watson	KO (punches)	1	2:30
Welterweight	Joel Vigors	def.	James O’Brien	Decision (unanimous)	3	5:00
Lightweight	James Vandarakis	def.	Mike Taylor	TKO (puches)	1	3:32

== Brace 41 ==
Brace 41 was an event held on June 17, 2016, at Lincoln Events Centre, in Christchurch, New Zealand.

=== Results ===
Main Card
Weight class				Method	Round	Time	Notes
Lightweight	Kieran Joblin	def.	Greg Atzori	Decision (unanimous)	3	5:00
Welterweight	Brogan Anderson	def.	Renan Secco	Decision (unanimous)	3	5:00
Light Heavyweight	Steven Warby	def.	Pane Haraki	TKO (punches)	1	1:56
Welterweight	B.J.. Bland	def.	Cole Davids	Decision (unanimoous)	3	5:00
Bantamweight	Faith Van Duin	def.	Charlene Watt	Decision (unanimous)	3	5:00
Lightweight	Josh Henderson	def.	Greg Watson	Decision (unanimous)	3	5:00
Middleweight	Matt Vaile	def.	Joe Van Duin	TKO (doctor stoppage)	1	5:00
Lightweight	Iain Blade	def.	Cameron Snell	TKO (punches)	1	2:36

== Brace 40 ==
Brace 40 was an event held on May 14, 2016, at RSL Southport, in Gold Coast, Australia, Australia.

=== Results ===
Main Card
Weight class				Method	Round	Time	Notes
Bantamweight	Michael Tobin	def.	Edwin Arana	Submission (armbar)	1	1:19
Lightweight	Alex MacDonald	def.	Gui Yoshimitsu	TKO (punches)	2	1:41
Welterweight	Rick Alchin	def.	James Klingner	TKO (punches)	1	2:42
Welterweight	Tristan Murphy	def.	Tom Kingston	Submission (armbar)	2	2:42
Bantamweight	Richie Ivory	def.	Matt George	TKO (head kick and punches)	1	0:28
Featherweight	Stefan Rosa	def.	Simon Arentz	TKO (punches)	1	2:45

== Brace 39 ==
Brace 39 was an event held on April 16, 2016, at AIS Arena, in Canberra, Australia.

=== Results ===
Main Card
Weight class				Method	Round	Time	Notes
Lightweight	Theo Christakos	def.	Kevin Manderson	Submission (rear-naked choke)	1	3:10
Lightweight	Anthony Bynoe	def.	Paul Franchi	TKO (shoulder injury)	2	0:51
Lightweight	Nurbolat Kuandyk	def.	Sean Le Gourrierec	TKO (punches	2	3;33
Bantamweight	Caitlin McEwen	def.	Jess Doueihi	TKO (punches	1	1:32
Welterweight	Joel Vigors	def.	Jarrod Farlow	TKO (punches)	1	4:50
Lightweight	Manson Lord	def.	Joe Pollock	Submission (rear-naked choke)	2	2:30
Featherweight	Ryan Gillett	def.	Paul Traish	Submission (armbar)	1	3:26

== Brace 38 ==
Brace 38 was an event held on March 26, 2016, at Big Top Luna Park, in Sydney, Australia.

=== Results ===
Main Card
Weight class				Method	Round	Time	Notes
Flyweight	Hera Tamati	def.	Jade Thomson	Technical Submission (rear-naked choke)	2	4:27
Welterweight	Andrew Mills	def.	Rick Alchin	Decision (unanimous) 3	3	5:00
Lightweight	Jesse Medina	def.	Ethan Duniam	Submission (rear-naked choke)	2	3:12
Featherweight	Myles Simpson	def.	Bayden Mandich	Technical Submission (rear-naked choke)	1	3:38
Bantamweight	Ben Watson	def.	George Malizis	Decision (unanimous)	3	5:00
Featherweight	Luke Catubig	def.	Kris Spence	TKO (punches)	1	1:42
