= 2014 in BRACE =

Mixed martial arts events

Information
- First date: March 15, 2014
- Last date: November 22, 2014

Events
- Total events: 8

Fights
- Total fights: 60
- Title fights: 6

Chronology
2013 in BRACE	2014 in BRACE	2015 in BRACE

The year 2014 was the sixth year in the history of BRACE, a mixed martial arts promotion based in Australia. In 2014 BRACE held 8 events.

== Events list ==
#	Event Title	Date	Arena	Location
32	Tournament Season 1 Final	November 20, 2014	AIS Arena	Canberra, Australia
31	BRACE Ascend 2	November 15, 2014	North Sydney Leagues Club	Sydney, Australia
30	BRACE 30	September 20, 2014	AIS Arena	Newcastle, Australia
29	BRACE 29	August 9, 2014	North Sydney Leagues Club	Sydney, Australia
28	BRACE 28	August 8, 2014	North Sydney Leagues Club	Sydney, Australia
27	BRACE 27	May 17, 2014	AIS Arena	Canberra, Australia
26	BRACE Ascend 1	May 3, 2014	North Sydney Leagues Club	Sydney, Australia

== BRACE Tournament Season 1 Final ==
BRACE Tournament Season 1 Final was an event held on November 20, 2014, at AIS Arena in Canberra, Australia.

=== Results ===
Main Card
Weight class				Method	Round	Time	Notes
Featherweight	Ryan Gillett	def.	Jack Veliks	Submission (armbar)	1	4:44	(Note: For BRACE welterweight championship)
Welterweight	Corey Nelson	def.	Steve Micallef	TKO (punches)	1	4:44	(Note: For BRACE welterweight championship)
Featherweight	Jamie Mullarkey	def.	J.J. Van Aswegen	TKO (knee injury)	1	0:59	(Note: For BRACE featherweight championship)
Bantamweight	Jordan Lucas	def.	Stephen Reeks	Submission (rear-naked choke)	1	3:52	(Note: For BRACE bantamweight championship)
Middleweight	Rob Wilkinson	def.	Gerhard Voigt	Submission (rear-naked choke)	1	3:45	(Note: For BRACE middleweight championship)
N/A	Able Brites	def.	Ali Cevik	Submission (rear-naked choke)	2	4:59
Light Heavyweight	Mike Turner	def.	Connor Murphy	Submission (rear-naked choke)	2	1:12	(Note: For BRACE middleweight championship)
Lightweight	Nurbolat Kuandyk	def.	Matt Darke	Submission (triangle choke)	1	N/A

== BRACE Ascend 2 ==
BRACE Ascend 2 was an event held on November 15, 2014, at North Sydney Leagues Club in Sydney, Australia.

=== Results ===
Main Card
Weight class				Method	Round	Time	Notes
Middleweight	John Mitchell	def.	Billy McCalees	TKO	1	0:59
Middleweight	Andrew Mills	def.	Luke Spears	TKO	1	1:44
N/A	Tyrone Lacey	def.	Daniel Gill	KO	3	2:13
N/A	Matt Cassell	def.	Dave O’Hare	Submission (armbar)	1	1:31
N/A	James Najim	def.	Moey Ozmen	Submission (rear-naked choke)	1	2:10
N/A	Nathan Reddy	def.	Cam Rowston	Decision (unanimous)	3	3:00

== BRACE 30 ==
BRACE 30 was an event held on September 20, 2014, at AIS Arena in Sydney, Australia.

=== Results ===
Main Card
Weight class				Method	Round	Time	Notes
Lightweight	Abel Brites	def.	Adam Bourke	TKO (punches)	1	2:39
N/A	Tom Kingston	def.	Jesse Sutherland	TKO (punches)	2	0:40
Featherweight	Brad Shortland	def.	Geo Ellahi	Submission (armbar)	3	1:27
Lightweight	Nathan Walters	def.	Myles Steele	Submission (triangle choke)	1	0:39
N/A	Nicky Bonini	def.	Myles Steele	Decision (unanimous)	3	5:00

== BRACE 29 ==
BRACE 29 was an event held on August 9, 2014, at North Sydney Leagues Club in Sydney, Australia.

=== Results ===
Main Card
Weight class				Method	Round	Time	Notes
Welterweight	Steve Micallef	def.	Regan Wilson	Submission (rear-naked choke)	1	1:12
Featherweight	J.J. Van Aswegen	def.	Gokhan Turkyilmaz	Submission (triangle choke)	1	N/A
Middleweight	Gerhard Voigh	def.	William Namoa	TKO (punches)	1	4:40
Bantamweight	Jordan Lucas	def.	Edwin Arana	Submission (rear naked choke)	1	2:40
N/A	Nicky Bonini	def.	Chris Klimis	TKO (punches)	1	N/A
Atomweight	Natalie Hills	def.	Lizza Gebilagin	Submission (rear-naked choke)	1	1:44
Welterweight	Josh Lagudah	def.	Will Swann	Decision (unanimous)	3	3:00

== BRACE 28 ==
BRACE 28 was an event held on August 8, 2014, at North Sydney Leagues Club in Sydney, Australia.

=== Results ===
Main Card
Weight class				Method	Round	Time	Notes
Light Heavyweight	Connor Murphy	def.	Francis Cullimore	TKO (punches)	1	4:21
Featherweight	Jamie Mullarkey	def.	Byron Cowell	Submission (rear-naked choke)	1	4:47
Bantamweight	Giancarlo Ebradora	def.	Tom Cruz	Decision (majority)	3	5:00
Middleweight	Rob Wilkinson	def.	Rick Alchin	TKO (elbows)	1	4:16
Middleweight	Andrew Mills	def.	Jia Xu	Decision (unanimous)	3	5:00
Welterweight	Ali Cevik	def.	Aydin Mrouki	TKO (doctor stoppaged)	1	N/A
N/A	Jeff Bowers	def.	Nick Roche	TKO (punches)	3	1:54

== BRACE 27 ==
BRACE 27 was an event held on May 17, 2014, at AIS Arena, in Canberra, Australia.

=== Results ===
Main Card
Weight class				Method	Round	Time	Notes
Welterweight	Regan Wilson	def.	Ali Kocak Mohammed	Submission (rear-naked choke)	1	N/A
Lightweight	Abel Brites	def.	Kevin Manderson	Submission (armbar)	1	0:26
Light Heavyweight	Mike Turner	def.	Sam Kei	Decision (unanimous)	3	5:00
Bantamweight	Jordan Lucas	def.	Richie Ivory	Decision (unanimous)	3	5:00
Welterweight	Josh Lagudah	def.	Luke Logan	TKO (punches)	1	2:25
Middleweight	Rob Wilkinson	def.	Kit Campbell	Submission (triangle choke)	1	1:32
Featherweight	Steve McKinnon	def.	Mick Sumner	Submission (rear-naked choke)	1	2:55

== BRACE Ascend 1 ==
BRACE Ascend 1 was an event held on May 3, 2014, at North Sydney Leagues Club in Sydney, Australia.

=== Results ===
Main Card
Weight class				Method	Round	Time	Notes
Bantamweight	Edwin Arana	def.	Mark Baskin	Submission (guillotine choke)	1	0:22
N/A	Saeed Fatahfir	def.	Tim Brogan	Decision	3	3:00
N/A	Chris Klimis	def.	Josh Togo	TKO	2	N/A
Welterweight	Luke Logan	def.	Ofa Misa	Submission (rear-naked choke)	2	N/A
N/A	Nick Roche	def.	Nathan Walters	Draw	3	3:00
N/A	Cam Rowston	def.	Rhys Savage	Decision (unanimous)	3	3:00
Middleweight	Reza Almasi	def.	Brenton Leggett	TKO	2	2:57

== BRACE 26 ==
BRACE 26 was an event held on March 15, 2014, at North Sydney Leagues Club in Sydney, Australia.

=== Results ===
Main Card
Weight class				Method	Round	Time	Notes
Middleweight	Gerhard Voigt	def.	Mohammed Abdu Naim	KO (punch)	1	1:30
Middleweight	Billy McAlees	def.	Shane Phillips	TKO	1	1:54
Featherweight	J.J. Van Aswegen	def.	Luke Standing	TKO	1	2:32
Bantamweight	Giancarlo Embradora	def.	DarwinSagurit	Decision (unanimous)	3	5:00
Welterweight	Steve Micallef	def.	Hoshi Friedrich	Decision (unanimous)	3	5:00
Featherweight	Jamie Mullarkey	def.	Joshua Pecastaing	TKO (punches)	3	0:49
Light Heavyweight	Connor Murphy	def.	Chris Lofts	Decision (unanimous)	3	5:00
