= 2017 in BRACE =

Mixed martial arts events

Information
- First date: March 04, 2017
- Last date: TBA

Events
- Total events: TBA

Fights
- Total fights: TBA
- Title fights: TBA

Chronology
2016 in BRACE	2017 in BRACE	2018 in BRACE

The year 2017 was the ninth year in the history of BRACE, a mixed martial arts promotion based in Australia.

== Events list ==
#	Event title	Date	Arena	Location
50	Brace 52	November 11, 2017	AIS Arena	Canberra, Australia
49	Brace 51	October 10, 2017	Big Top Luna Park	Sydney, Australia
48	Brace 50	May 13, 2017	Township Auditorium	Townsville, Australia
47	Brace 49	April 8, 2017	AIS Arena	Canberra, Australia
N/A	Brace 48	N/A	N/A	N/A
46	Brace 47	March 18, 2017	Big Top Luna Park	Sydney, Australia
Cancelled	Brace 46	March 4, 2017	RSL Southport	Gold Coast, Australia, Australia

== Brace 52 ==
Brace 52 was an event held on November 11, 2017, at AIS Arena in Canberra, Australia.

=== Results ===
Main Card
Weight class				Method	Round	Time	Notes
Bantamweight	Rhianno Thompson	def.	Claire Tood	Submission (rear naked choke)	5	3:00	(Note: Won Brace Women's Bantamweight Championship)
Lightweight	Paul Franchi	def.	Simon Arentz	TKO (knee)	1	N/A
Lightweight	Blake Donnelly	def.	Mike Taylor	TKO (punches)	1	N/A
Light heavyweight	Rick Alchin	def.	Jeff King	TKO (punches)	1	N/A
Strawweight	Olivia Ukmar	def.	Maddison Skinner	TKO (punches)	1	0:59
Catch weight @ 175 Ibs	Tyson Royal	def.	Adam Toohey	Submission (rear naked choe)	1	N/A

== Brace 51 ==
Brace 51 was an event held on October 28, 2017, at Big Top Luna Park in Sydney, Australia.

=== Results ===
Main Card
Weight class				Method	Round	Time	Notes
Featherweight	Jamie Mullarkey	def.	Jesse Medina	TKO	3	N/A
Lightweight	Abel Brites	def.	Ethan Duniam	Decision	3	5:00
Featherweight	Mohammed Alavi	def.	James Vandarakis	Submission (rear naked choke)	2	N/A
Middleweight	Cam Rowston	def.	Dan Currie	TKO	1	0:38
Bantamweight	Emma Von Ryan	def.	Danielle Curtis	TKO	1	0:30
N/A	Jack Thorburn	def.	Guy Kenjar	N/A	2	N/A

== Brace 50 ==
Brace 50 was an event held on May 13, 2017, at Township Auditorium in Townsville, Australia.

=== Results ===
Main Card
Weight class				Method	Round	Time	Notes
Bantamweight	Luke Catubig	def.	Edwin Arana	TKO	2	N/A
Featherweight	Aden Hawke	def.	Kris Spence	Submission (armbar)	2	N/A
Bantamweight	Ben Watson	def.	Beau Luxford	Submission (guillotine choke)	3	N/A
Bantamweight	Jamie Renou	def.	Ben Mason	Submission (guillotine choke)	1	N/A
Middleweight	Cam Rowston	def.	Jye Wyllie	TKO	1	N/A

== Brace 49 ==
Brace 49 was an event held on April 8, 2017, at AIS Arena in Canberra, Australia.

=== Results ===
Main Card
Weight class				Method	Round	Time	Notes
Light Heavyweight	Duke Didier	def.	Mike Turner	Decision (unanimous)	3	5:00	(Note: For Brace Light Heavyweight Championship)
Lightweight	Ethan Duniam	def.	Myles Simpson	TKO	1	N/A
Welterweight	Anthony Bynoe	def.	Stephen Owens	Decision	3	5:00
Welterweight	Josh Tummers	def.	Ryan Mills	Decision	3	5:00
	Rene Cayqueo	def.	Stephen Anderton	Decision	3	5:00
	Brennan Corey	def.	Robert Cuthill	TKO	2	N/A
	Dean McNay	def.	Tyson Royal	TKO	2	N/A

== Brace 47 ==
Brace 47 was an event held on March 18, 2017, at Big Top Luna Park in Sydney, Australia.

=== Results ===
Main Card
Weight class				Method	Round	Time	Notes
	Theo Christakos	def.	Andrew Mills	Submission (rear-naked choke)	2	4:19
	David Francis	def.	Rick Alchin	KO (punches)	1	2:37
	Nubolat Kuandyk	def.	Beau Luxford	Submission (triangle choke)	1	4:13
	Ben Watson	def.	Byron Cowell	Submission (guillotine choke)	1	1:34
	Jacob Malkoun	def.	Cameron Rowston	Decision (unanimous)	3	5:00
	Claire Todd	def.	Mellisa Zeman	Decision (split)	3	5:00
	Joel Vigors	def.	Luke Spears	KO (head kick)	1	1:05

== Brace 46 ==
Brace 46 was expected to be held on March 4, 2017, at RSL Southport in Gold Coast, Australia, and it was cancelled.
