= Martin Nguyen =

Australian mixed martial arts fighter

- Born: 5 March 1989 (age 37); Sydney, New South Wales, Australia
- Other names: The Situ-Asian
- Nationality: Australian
- Height: 5 ft 8 in (1.73 m)
- Weight: 155 lb (70 kg; 11 st 1 lb)
- Division: Featherweight; Lightweight
- Reach: 69.7 in (177 cm)
- Fighting out of: Deerfield Beach, Florida, U.S.
- Team: Kill Cliff FC
- Years active: 2012–2025

Mixed martial arts record
- Total: 23
- Wins: 15
- By knockout: 10
- By submission: 3
- By decision: 2
- Losses: 8
- By knockout: 3
- By submission: 2
- By decision: 3

Other information
- Mixed martial arts record from Sherdog

Martin Nguyen (born 5 March 1989) is an Australian former mixed martial artist, who competed in the featherweight division. A professional from 2012 till 2025, Nguyen is most notable for his stint in ONE Championship, where he was the former ONE Featherweight and ONE Lightweight World Champion, and was the first two-division champion in ONE's history, having held both belts simultaneously.

== Early life and education ==
Nguyen was born on 5 March 1989, in Sydney, to Vietnamese parents. Attending Ashcroft Primary School and Liverpool Boys High School, Martin played representative rugby league but after suffering constant injuries, decided he was better off away from the game. Nguyen then picked up martial arts at the age of 21, initially just to help lose weight and to find a new hobby, but soon realised he had a natural talent for it.

== Mixed martial arts career ==
=== ONE Championship ===
In the promotional debut, Nguyen faced Rocky Batolbatol on 7 November 2014, at ONE FC: Battle of Lions. He won the fight via a rear-naked choke submission in the second round.

Nguyen was scheduled to face Bashir Ahmad on 27 September 2015, at ONE: Odyssey of Champions. However, Nguyen was instead to face Marat Gafurov for the interim ONE Featherweight World Championship. He lost the bout via a rear-naked choke submission in the first round.

Nguyen faced Edward Kelly on 13 November 2015, at ONE: Pride of Lions. He won the fight via a doctor stoppage technical knockout in the first round.

Nguyen faced Li Kai Wen on 15 April 2016, at ONE: Global Rivals. He won the fight via technical knockout in the first round.

Nguyen faced Christian Lee on 13 August 2016, at ONE: Heroes of the World. He won the fight via a guillotine choke technical submission in the first round.

Nguyen faced Kazunori Yokota on 14 January 2017, at ONE: Quest for Power. He won the fight via knockout in the first round.

==== Two-division champion ====
Nguyen faced Marat Gafurov for the ONE Featherweight World Championship on 18 August 2017, at ONE: Quest for Greatness. He won the bout and title via knockout in the second round.

Nguyen faced Eduard Folayang for the ONE Lightweight World Championship on 10 November 2017, at ONE: Legends of the World. He won the bout via knockout in the second round, making him the first simultaneous two-division champion in ONE history.

Nguyen faced Bibiano Fernandes for the ONE Bantamweight World Championship on 24 March 2018, at ONE: Iron Will. He lost the bout via split decision.

In his first title defense, Nguyen faced Christian Lee on 18 May 2018, at ONE: Unstoppable Dreams. He won the bout via split decision.

Nguyen faced Kevin Belingon for the interim ONE Bantamweight World Championship on 27 July 2018, at ONE: Reign of Kings. He lost the bout via unanimous decision.

On 28 September 2018, it was announced that Nguyen vacated the ONE Lightweight World Championship due to suffering an injury in training, rendering him unable to defend the title.

In the second title defense, Nguyen faced Jadamba Narantungalag on 12 April 2019, at ONE: Roots of Honor. He won the bout via a flying knee knockout in the second round.

In the third title defense, Nguyen faced Koyomi Matsushima on 2 August 2019, at ONE: Dawn of Heroes. He won the bout via technical knockout in the second round.

Nguyen defense the title against Thanh Le on 30 October 2020, at ONE: Inside the Matrix. He lost the bout and title via technical knockout in the third round.

==== Post-championship reign ====
Nguyen was scheduled to face Kim Jae-woong on 7 April 2021 and aired on 14 April 2021, at ONE on TNT 2. However, Nguyen was forced to withdraw due to not being cleared to compete with respect to health and safety protocols. The pair was rescheduled for ONE: Revolution on 24 September 2021. He lost the fight via knockout in the first round.

Nguyen faced Kirill Gorobets on 11 March 2022, at ONE: Lights Out. He won the fight via technical knockout in the third round.

Nguyen faced Ilya Freymanov on 1 October 2022, at ONE on Prime Video 2. He lost the fight via TKO (submission to knees) in the first round.

Nguyen was scheduled to face Shamil Gasanov on 25 February 2023, at ONE Fight Night 7. However, Gasanov was forced to withdraw due to an infection that stemmed from an injury. He was replaced by Razhabali Shaydullaev. In turn, Shaydullaev was forced to withdraw due to undisclosed reasons and was replaced by Leonardo Casotti. He won the fight via unanimous decision.

Nguyen faced Garry Tonon on 28 January 2024, at ONE 165. He lost the fight by rear-naked submission in the first round.

The match between Nguyen and Gasanov will be reschedule on 20 February 2025, at ONE 171. Nguyen lost the bout via unanimous decision and announced his retirement from competition after the bout.

== Personal life ==
Martin is married to Brooke Nguyen, and the couple have three children together, Kai, Tiarna, and Madison. In post-retirement, Nguyen enjoys playing Oztag recreationally.

== Championships and accomplishments ==
- ONE Championship
  - ONE Featherweight World Championship (One time)
    - Three successful title defenses
  - ONE Lightweight World Championship (One time)
  - First double champion in ONE history
- BRACE
  - Brace Featherweight Championship (One time)

== Mixed martial arts record ==
Professional record breakdown
23 matches	15 wins	8 losses
By knockout	10	3
By submission	3	2
By decision	2	3

Res.	Record	Opponent	Method	Event	Date	Round	Time	Location	Notes
Loss	15–8	Shamil Gasanov	Decision (unanimous)	ONE 171	20 February 2025	3	5:00	Lusail, Qatar	
Loss	15–7	Garry Tonon	Submission (rear-naked choke)	ONE 165	28 January 2024	1	4:41	Tokyo, Japan	
Win	15–6	Leonardo Casotti	Decision (unanimous)	ONE Fight Night 7	25 February 2023	3	5:00	Bangkok, Thailand	
Loss	14–6	Ilya Freymanov	TKO (submission to knees)	ONE on Prime Video 2	1 October 2022	1	3:33	Kallang, Singapore	
Win	14–5	Kirill Gorobets	TKO (punches)	ONE: Lights Out	11 March 2022	3	2:18	Kallang, Singapore	
Loss	13–5	Kim Jae-woong	KO (punches)	ONE: Revolution	24 September 2021	1	3:15	Kallang, Singapore	
Loss	13–4	Thanh Le	TKO (punches)	ONE: Inside the Martix	30 October 2020	3	2:19	Kallang, Singapore	Lost the ONE Featherweight Championship (155 lb).
Win	13–3	Koyomi Matsushima	TKO (punches)	ONE: Dawn of Heroes	2 August 2019	2	4:40	Pasay, Philippines	Defended the ONE Featherweight Championship (155 lb). Broke the record for the most consecutive ONE Featherweight title defenses (3).
Win	12–3	Jadamba Narantungalag	KO (flying knee)	ONE: Roots of Honor	12 April 2019	2	1:07	Pasay, Philippines	Defended the ONE Featherweight Championship (155 lb).
Loss	11–3	Kevin Belingon	Decision (unanimous)	ONE: Reign of Kings	27 July 2018	5	5:00	Pasay, Philippines	For the interim ONE Bantamweight Championship (145 lb).
Win	11–2	Christian Lee	Decision (split)	ONE: Unstoppable Dreams	18 May 2018	5	5:00	Kallang, Singapore	Defended the ONE Featherweight Championship (155 lb).
Loss	10–2	Bibiano Fernandes	Decision (split)	ONE: Iron Will	24 March 2018	5	5:00	Bangkok, Thailand	For the ONE Bantamweight Championship (145 lb).
Win	10–1	Eduard Folayang	KO (punch)	ONE: Legends of the World	10 November 2017	2	2:20	Pasay, Philippines	Won the ONE Lightweight Championship. Nguyen vacated the title on 28 September 2018 due to injury.
Win	9–1	Marat Gafurov	KO (punch)	ONE: Quest for Greatness	18 August 2017	2	1:27	Kuala Lumpur, Malaysia	Won the ONE Featherweight Championship.
Win	8–1	Kazunori Yokota	KO (punches)	ONE: Quest for Power	14 January 2017	1	3:36	Jakarta, Indonesia	
Win	7–1	Christian Lee	Technical Submission (guillotine choke)	ONE: Heroes of the World	13 August 2016	1	4:30	Macau, SAR, China	
Win	6–1	Li Kai Wen	TKO (punches)	ONE: Global Rivals	15 April 2016	1	4:44	Pasay, Philippines	
Win	5–1	Edward Kelly	TKO (doctor stoppage)	ONE: Pride of Lions	13 November 2015	1	4:17	Kallang, Singapore	
Loss	4–1	Marat Gafurov	Submission (rear-naked choke)	ONE: Odyssey of Champions	27 September 2015	1	0:41	Jakarta, Indonesia	For the interim ONE Featherweight Championship.
Win	4–0	Rocky Batolbatol	Submission (rear-naked choke)	ONE FC: Battle of the Lions	7 November 2014	2	2:10	Kallang, Singapore	
Win	3–0	Luke Standing	TKO (punches)	BRACE 24	29 November 2013	1	3:30	Canberra, Australia	Won the vacant Brace Featherweight Championship.
Win	2–0	Thomas Ruderman	TKO (punches)	BRACE 18	21 December 2012	2	N/A	Canberra, Australia	Featherweight debut.
Win	1–0	Richard Kemp-Hay	Submission (rear-naked choke)	Cage Conquest 1	28 July 2012	3	1:39	Nowra, Australia	Lightweight debut.

== See also ==
- List of male mixed martial artists
- Double champions in MMA
