= Jamie Mullarkey =

Australian mixed martial arts fighter

- Born: Jamie Mullarkey; 17 August 1994 (age 32); Central Coast, New South Wales, Australia
- Height: 6 ft (183 cm)
- Weight: 155 lb (70 kg; 11 st 1 lb)
- Division: Lightweight
- Reach: 74 in (188 cm)
- Style: Brazilian jiu-jitsu
- Team: Magnus MMA (2011–present); Central Coast MMA (2017–present)
- Rank: Black belt in Brazilian jiu-jitsu under Noah Magnus
- Years active: 2013–present

Mixed martial arts record
- Total: 27
- Wins: 18
- By knockout: 10
- By submission: 3
- By decision: 5
- Losses: 9
- By knockout: 6
- By submission: 1
- By decision: 2

Other information
- Mixed martial arts record from Sherdog

Jamie Mullarkey (born 17 August 1994) is an Australian mixed martial artist who competed in the Lightweight division of the Ultimate Fighting Championship.

== Background ==
Mullarkey grew up in Central Coast area, attending Erina High School. He began training mixed martial arts at the age of 14 during rugby off-seasons to keep in shape.

== Mixed martial arts career ==
=== Early career ===
Starting his professional career in 2013, Mullarkey compiled a 12–2 record on the regional Australian scene, winning the UFN Lightweight Championship, Super Fight MMA Lightweight Championship, and BRACE Featherweight Championship in the process. He also fought future UFC Featherweight Champion Alexander Volkanovski for the Australian Fighting Championship Featherweight title, losing the bout in the first round via KO.

=== Ultimate Fighting Championship ===
Mullarkey made his UFC debut against fellow newcomer, Brad Riddell at UFC 243 on 5 October 2019. He lost the bout via unanimous decision but took home the Fight of the Night bonus.

Mullarkey was expected to face Jalin Turner on 3 February 2020 at UFC Fight Night 168. However Mullarkey was forced to withdraw from the bout due to injury and he was replaced by Joshua Culibao.

Mullarkey made his sophomore appearance in the organization against Farès Ziam at UFC Fight Night: Ortega vs. The Korean Zombie on 18 October 2020. He lost the fight via unanimous decision.

Mullarkey faced Khama Worthy at UFC 260 on 27 March 2021. He won via knockout within the first minute of the bout.

Mullarkey faced Devonte Smith on 2 October 2021 at UFC Fight Night 193. He won the fight via technical knockout in round two. This win earned him the Performance of the Night award.

Mullarkey faced Jalin Turner on 5 March 2022 at UFC 272. He lost the fight via technical knockout in round two.

Mullarkey faced Michael Johnson on 9 July 2022 at UFC on ESPN: dos Anjos vs. Fiziev. He won the fight via split decision. The bout earned the Fight of the Night bonus award.

Mullarkey was scheduled to face Magomed Mustafaev on 22 October 2022 at UFC 280. However, Mullarkey pulled out in mid-September due to injury.

Mullarkey was scheduled to face Nasrat Haqparast on 12 February 2023, at UFC 284. However, Haqparast withdrew due to undisclosed reason and was replaced by promotional newcomer Francisco Prado. He won the fight via unanimous decision.

Mullarkey was scheduled to face Guram Kutateladze on 3 June 2023, at UFC on ESPN 46. However, Kutatuledze withdrew from the bout and was replaced by Muhammad Naimov. Mullarkey lost the bout via technical knockout in the second round.

Mullarkey faced John Makdessi on 10 September 2023, at UFC 293. He won the fight by unanimous decision.

Mullarkey faced Nasrat Haqparast on 9 December 2023 at UFC Fight Night 233. He lost the fight via knockout in round one.

Mullarkey faced Maurício Ruffy on 4 May 2024, at UFC 301. He lost via TKO stoppage at the end of the first round.

Mullarkey faced Rolando Bedoya on 28 September 2025 at UFC Fight Night 260. He won the fight via unanimous decision.

Replacing Rong Zhu, Mullarkey faced Quillan Salkilld on February 1, 2026, at UFC 325. He lost the fight via a rear-naked choke submission in the first round.

On May 29, 2026, it was reported that Mullarkey was removed from the UFC roster.

== Championships and accomplishments ==
=== Mixed martial arts ===
- Ultimate Fighting Championship
  - Fight of the Night (Two times) vs. Brad Riddell and Michael Johnson
  - Performance of the Night (One time) vs. Devonte Smith
- BRACE MMA
  - BRACE Season 1 Featherweight Tournament Championship
  - BRACE Featherweight Champion (One time; former)
- Urban Fight Night
  - UFN Lightweight Champion (One time; former)
- Superfight MMA
  - Superfight MMA Lightweight Champion (one time; former)
    - One successful title defense

== Mixed martial arts record ==
Professional record breakdown
27 matches	18 wins	9 losses
By knockout	10	6
By submission	3	1
By decision	5	2

Res.	Record	Opponent	Method	Event	Date	Round	Time	Location	Notes
Loss	18–9	Quillan Salkilld	Submission (neck crank)	UFC 325	February 1, 2026	1	3:01	Sydney, Australia	
Win	18–8	Rolando Bedoya	Decision (unanimous)	UFC Fight Night: Ulberg vs. Reyes	September 28, 2025	3	5:00	Perth, Australia	
Loss	17–8	Maurício Ruffy	TKO (punches)	UFC 301	May 4, 2024	1	4:42	Rio de Janeiro, Brazil	
Loss	17–7	Nasrat Haqparast	TKO (punches)	UFC Fight Night: Song vs. Gutiérrez	December 9, 2023	1	1:44	Las Vegas, Nevada, United States	
Win	17–6	John Makdessi	Decision (unanimous)	UFC 293	September 10, 2023	3	5:00	Sydney, Australia	
Loss	16–6	Muhammad Naimov	TKO (punches)	UFC on ESPN: Kara-France vs. Albazi	June 3, 2023	2	2:59	Las Vegas, Nevada, United States	
Win	16–5	Francisco Prado	Decision (unanimous)	UFC 284	February 12, 2023	3	5:00	Perth, Australia	
Win	15–5	Michael Johnson	Decision (split)	UFC on ESPN: dos Anjos vs. Fiziev	July 9, 2022	3	5:00	Las Vegas, Nevada, United States	Fight of the Night.
Loss	14–5	Jalin Turner	TKO (punches)	UFC 272	March 5, 2022	2	0:46	Las Vegas, Nevada, United States	
Win	14–4	Devonte Smith	TKO (punches)	UFC Fight Night: Santos vs. Walker	October 2, 2021	2	2:51	Las Vegas, Nevada, United States	Performance of the Night.
Win	13–4	Khama Worthy	KO (punches)	UFC 260	March 27, 2021	1	0:46	Las Vegas, Nevada, United States	
Loss	12–4	Farès Ziam	Decision (unanimous)	UFC Fight Night: Ortega vs. The Korean Zombie	October 18, 2020	3	5:00	Abu Dhabi, United Arab Emirates	
Loss	12–3	Brad Riddell	Decision (unanimous)	UFC 243	October 5, 2019	3	5:00	Melbourne, Australia	Fight of the Night.
Win	12–2	Edimar Teixeira	TKO (retirement)	Superfight MMA 11	May 3, 2019	2	5:00	Punchbowl, Australia	Defended the Superfight MMA Lightweight Championship.
Win	11–2	Abel Brites	TKO (punches)	Superfight MMA 9	November 16, 2018	2	1:51	Punchbowl, Australia	Won the Superfight MMA Lightweight Championship.
Win	10–2	Josh Togo	TKO (punches)	Urban Fight Night 15	April 14, 2018	1	5:00	Liverpool, Australia	Return to Lightweight. Won the UFN Lightweight Championship.
Win	9–2	Jesse Medina	TKO (punches)	BRACE 51	October 28, 2017	3	N/A	Sydney, Australia	
Loss	8–2	Luke Catubig	TKO (elbows)	BRACE 42	August 13, 2016	2	4:19	Canberra, Australia	
Loss	8–1	Alexander Volkanovski	KO (punch)	Australian FC 15	May 19, 2016	1	3:23	Melbourne, Australia	For the AFC Featherweight Championship.
Win	8–0	Greg Criticos	Submission (rear-naked choke)	BRACE 37	November 21, 2015	2	3:01	Canberra, Australia	Won the BRACE Featherweight Championship.
Win	7–0	David Simmons	TKO (punches)	BRACE 36	September 19, 2015	1	2:47	Sydney, Australia	
Win	6–0	Stefan Rosa	Submission (rear-naked choke)	BRACE 33	April 18, 2015	1	4:13	Newcastle, Australia	
Win	5–0	JJ Van Aswegen	TKO (knee injury)	BRACE 31	November 22, 2014	1	0:59	Canberra, Australia	
Win	4–0	Byron Cowell	Submission (rear-naked choke)	BRACE 28	August 8, 2014	1	4:47	Cammeray, Australia	
Win	3–0	Joshua Pecastaing	TKO (punches)	BRACE 26	March 15, 2014	3	0:49	Sydney, Australia	Return to Featherweight.
Win	2–0	David Greaves	Decision (unanimous)	Roshambo MMA 2	February 1, 2014	3	5:00	Brisbane, Australia	Lightweight debut.
Win	1–0	Luke Hume	TKO (punches)	BRACE 23	October 26, 2013	1	4:59	Townsville, Australia	Featherweight debut.

== See also ==
- List of male mixed martial artists
