= 2012 in BRACE =

Mixed martial arts events

Information
- First date: February 18, 2012
- Last date: December 21, 2012

Events
- Total events: 5

Fights
- Total fights: 16

Chronology
2011 in BRACE	2012 in BRACE	2013 in BRACE

The year 2012 was the fourth year in the history of BRACE, a mixed martial arts promotion based in Australia. In 2012 BRACE held 5 events.

== Events list ==
#	Event title	Date	Arena	Location
17	BRACE 18	December 21, 2012	Convention Centre	Canberra, Australia
16	BRACE 17	October 27, 2012	Southport RSL	Gold Coast, Australia
(event cancelled)	BRACE 16	June 16, 2012	Southport RSL	Gold Coast, Australia
15	BRACE 15	April 28, 2012	Ex-Services Bowling Club	Coffs Harbour, Australia
14	BRACE 14	February 18, 2012	Convention Centre	Canberra, Australia

== BRACE 18 ==
BRACE 18 was an event held on 21 December 2012 at Convention Centre, Canberra, Australia.

=== Results ===
Main Card
Weight class				Method	Round	Time	Notes
	Felise Leniu	def.	Andrew Machin	TKO (doctor stoppage)	3	0:00
	Kevin Manderson	def.	Jon Leven	Submission (kimura)	3	0:00
	Luke Standing	def.	Richard Kemp-Hay	Submission (armbar)	2	4:03
	Martin Nguyen	def.	Tomas Ruderman	TKO (punches)	2	0:00
	Jessica-Rose Clark	def.	Mae-Lin Leow	TKO (punches)	3	2:17
	Richard Walsh	def.	Aaron Forsterling	Decision (unanimous)	3	3:00
	Mike Turner	def.	Morris Molesi	Submission (rear naked choke)1	1	0:00
	Aydin Mrouki	def.	Erik Rand	Submission (rear-naked choke)	1	0:00
	Lana kate	def.	Amy Adam	Decision (split)	3	3:00
	Stephen Owen	def.	George Strogylos	Submission (rear-nake choke)	2	0:00

== BRACE 17 ==
BRACE 17 was an event held on 27 October 2012, at Southport RSL, Gold Coast, Australia.

=== Results ===
Main Card
Weight class				Method	Round	Time	Notes
Strawweight	Alex Chambers	def.	Mika Nagano	TKO (knee and punches)	1	0:42
Strawweight	Claire Fryer	def.	Rina Tomita	TKO (punches)	1	2:37
Featherweight	Fiona Muxlow	def.	Leanne Reid	decision (unanimous)	3	3:00
Flyweight	Rhiannon Thompson	def.	Linda Nikeller	Submission (rear-naked choke)	2	2:27
Bantamweight	Tanya Stevens	def.	Mae-Lin Leow	Decision (majority)	3	3:00
Strawweight	Shauna Carew	def.	Gina Cardillo	Decision (unanimous)	3	3:00
Atomweight	Natalie Gonzales hills	def.	Samatha Manderson	Submission (rear-naked choke)	3	1:34
Featherweight	Helen Malone	def.	Lana Kate	Submission (rear-naked choke)	1	2:07
Lightweight	Kerry Barrett	def.	Brettlyn Nael	Decision (unanimous)	3	3:00
Lightweight	Maryanne Mullahy	def.	Rebecca Steward	Submission (armbar)	2	0:49
Bantamweight	Lisa Sutton	def.	Belinda Sedgwick	Technical Submission (rear-naked choke)	1	1:32

== BRACE 15 ==
BRACE 15 was an event held on April 28, 2012, at Ex-Services Bowling Club, Coffs Harbour, Australia.

=== Results ===
Main Card
Weight class				Method	Round	Time	Notes
Welterweight	Ben Alloway	def.	Rod Staader	TKO (punches)	2	3:39
Middleweight	Aaron Dyett	def.	Connor Murphy	TKO (punches)	2	0:58
Lightweight	Gokhan Turkyilmaz	def.	Sam Bastin	Decision (unanimous)	3	5:00
Bantamweight	Jacob Mahony	draw.	Luke Morris	Draw (split)	3	5:00
Welterweight	Jordan Anthony	def.	Paul Daniel	Submission (rear-naked choke)	1	1:23
Featherweight	David Greaves	def.	Mark Brady	Decision (unanimous)	3	5:00

== BRACE 14 ==
BRACE 14 was an event held on February 18, 2012, at Convention Centre, Canberra, Australia.

=== Results ===
Main Card
Weight class				Method	Round	Time	Notes
	Dave Brooksbank	def.	Luke Hume	Submission (triangle choke)	1	4:45
	Andrew Machin	def.	Joel Dickson	TKO (punches)	1	4:45
	Bec Rawlings	def.	Sarah Morrision	Submission (armbar)	2	1:30
	Luke Standing	def.	Giancario Embradora	Decision (unanimous)	3	5:00
	Duke Didier	def.	Hugo Miller	Submission (guillotine choke)	1	2:30
	Rob Wilkinson	def.	Marc Gehret	TKO (punches)	1	4:55
	Greg Criticos	def.	Richard Kemp-Hay	Submission (rear-naked choke)	1	2:59
	Rami El-Choufani	def.	Bela Gaal	TKO (punches)	1	4:50
	Sean Godkin	def.	Peter High	TKO (doctor stoppage)	2	5:00
