= 2010 in BRACE =

Mixed martial arts events

Information
- First date: January 16, 2010
- Last date: November 13, 2010

Events
- Total events: 4

Fights
- Total fights: 38

Chronology
2009 in BRACE	2010 in BRACE	2011 in BRACE

The year 2010 was the second year in the history of BRACE, a mixed martial arts promotion based in Australia. In 2010 BRACE held 4 events.

== Events list ==
#	Event title	Date	Arena	Location
6	BRACE 6	November 13, 2010	Townsville Entertainment Centre	Townsville, Australia
5	BRACE 5	August 14, 2010	Broncos Leagues	Brisbane, Australia
4	BRACE 4	May 8, 2010	Townsville Entertainment Centre	Townsville, Australia
3	BRACE 3	Jan 16, 2010	Jupiters Casino	Townsville, Australia

== BRACE 6 ==
BACE 6 was an event held on November 13, 2010, at Townsville Entertainment Centre in Townsville, Australia

=== Results ===
Main Card
Weight class				Method	Round	Time	Notes
	Tony Lopez	def.	Brad Morris	Submission (rear-naked choke)	2	0:00
	Edwin Arana	def.	Luke Hume	Submission (rear-naked choke)	3	2:02
	Gokhan Turkyilmaz	def.	Chris Bridgewater	Decision (unanimous)	3	5:00
	Paul Abdul Rahman	def.	Joe Kenworthy	TKO (punches)	3	1:37
	Malcolm Vanderaar	def.	Peter Day	Submission (guillotine choke)	3	1:18
	Christian Montoya	def.	Craig Callaghan	Decision (majority)	3	5:00
	Travis Dean	def.	Phillip Thomson	Decision (majority)	3	5:00
	Mark Tabone	def.	Kya Pate	TKO (punches)	1	2:43
	Jaryd Terkelsen	def.	Elliott Duncan	KO (head kic)	1	0:39

== BRACE 5 ==
BACE 5 was an event held on August 14, 2010, at Broncos Leagues in Brisbane, Australia

=== Results ===
Main Card
Weight class				Method	Round	Time	Notes
	Brandon Bell	def.	Jon Leven	Submission (armbar)	2	4:57
	Edwin Arana	def.	Jacob Mahony	Decision (unanimous)	3	5:00
	Luke Hume	def.	Tyson Kroehn	DQ (Illegal Kne)	2	1:55
	Luke Peters	def.	Ben Alloway	Submission (guillotine choke)	1	4:50
	Panapa Pereira	def.	Josh Webb	Submission (kimura)	2	2:17
	Shannon Ross	def.	Chris Reddan	TKO (punches)	1	2:58
	Christian Montoya	def.	Crag Lanester	TKO (punches)	1	2:45
	Mark Tabone	def.	Malcolm Vanderaar	TKO (doctor stoppage)	1	1:36
	Craig Callaghan	def.	Ben Bruin	TKO (punches)	1	1:37

== BRACE 4 ==
BACE 4 was an event held on May 8, 2010, at Townsville Entertainment Centre in Townsville, Australia

=== Results ===
Main Card
Weight class				Method	Round	Time	Notes
	Dan Enson Hyatt	def.	Gokhan Turkylmaz	Submission (rear-naked choke)	1	2:48
	Luke Hume	def.	Francis MacDonald	Submission (kimura)	1	2:24
	Edwin Arana	def.	Tyson Kroehn	TKO (punches)	3	2:00
	Josh Ogilvie	def.	Karl King	TKO (punches)	1	2:05
	Jay Cobain	def.	Anthony Pagan	Submission (Kimura)	1	2:37
	Aaron Raffin	def.	Nicholas Meikel	Submission (rear-naked choke)	1	2:05
	Brad Nixon	def.	Mark Tabone	Submission (armbar)	2	1:00
	Jacob Mahony	def.	Thomas Manderson	Submission (rear-naked choke)	1	1:40
	Mark Jorgensen	def.	Matt Cruikshank	TKO (punches)	3	2:00
	Luke Peters	def.	Mitch Saltner	Submission (armbar)	1	2:46

== BRACE 3 ==
BRACE 3 was an event held on January 16, 2010, at Jupiters Casino in Townsville, Australia

=== Results ===
Main Card
Weight class				Method	Round	Time	Notes
	Luke Hume	def.	Edwin Arana	Decision (majority)	3	3:00
	Ryan Yanz	def.	Ryan Byrne	TKO (punches)	1	0:52
	Gokhan Turkyilmaz	def.	Jay Cobain	TKO (punches)	2	1:50
	Dan Enson Hyatt	def.	Kane Gehling	TKO (punches)	2	1:50
	Thomas Manderson	def.	Chris Bridgewater	Submission (guillotine choke)	1	2:20
	Josh Ogilvie	def.	Jarred Carter	TKO (punches)	1	2:00
	Malcolm Vanderaar	def.	David Geater	TKO (punches)	1	1:28
	Travis Dean	def.	Simon Hately	Submission (guillotine choke)	2	1:04
	Jacob Mahonly	def.	Cobba Mooney	Submission (rear-naked choke)	1	0:38
	Mark Tabone	def.	Steve Puplett	TKO (punches)	1	2:49
	Kya Pate	def.	Ben Manderson	TKO (punches)	2	0:59
