= 2011 in BRACE =

Mixed martial arts events

Information
- First date: January 15, 2011

Events
- Total events: 7

Fights
- Total fights: 61

Chronology
2010 in BRACE	2011 in BRACE	2012 in BRACE

The year 2011 is the third year in the history of BRACE, a mixed martial arts promotion based in Australia. In 2011 BRACE held 2 events.

== Events list ==
#	Event title	Date	Arena	Location
13	BRACE 13	November 19, 2011	Townsville Entertainment Centre	Townsville, Australia
12	BRACE 12	October 15, 2011	Derwent Entertainment Centre	Hobart, Australia
11	BRACE 11	September 17, 2011	Chandler Theatre	Brisbane, Australia
10	BRACE 10	August 27, 2011	Convention Centre	Canberra, Australia
9	BRACE 9	June 4, 2011	Townsville Entertainment Centre	Townsville, Australia
8	BRACE 8	April 30, 2011	Mansfield Tavern	Brisbane, Australia
7	BRACE 7	January 15, 2011	Convention Centre	Canberra, Australia

== BRACE 13 ==
BACE 13 was an event held on November 19, 2011, at Townsville Entertainment Centre, Townsville, Australia.

=== Results ===
Main Card
Weight class				Method	Round	Time	Notes
	Ryan Yanz	def.	Jon Leven	TKO (punches)	3	2:51
	Pat Promrangka	def.	Luke Hume	Submission (guillotine choke)	2	2:09
	Ben Alloway	def.	Dan Enson Hyatt	Submission (triangle choke)	1	3:49
	Marc Gehret	def.	Aaron Raffin	Decision (unanimous)	3	5:00
	Andrew Machin	def.	Jarred Carter	TKO (punches)	3	0:42
	Sean Kolders	def.	Craig Callghan	Submission (kimura)	2	0:43
	Kurtis pegoraro	def.	Chris Baker	Submission (rear-naked choke)	3	2:09

== BRACE 12 ==
BRACE 12 was an event held on October 15, 2011, at Derwent Entertainment Centre, Hobart, Australia.

=== Results ===
Main Card
Weight class				Method	Round	Time	Notes
	Nick Honstein	def.	Daniel Richardson	Submission (rear-naked choke)	1	1:42
	Cooner Murphy	def.	Chris Stone	Submission (armbar)	1	2:30
	Ban Enson Hyatt	def.	Brad Allen	Tko (punches)	1	1:10
	Troy Coull	def.	Nathan Vincent	Submission (guillotine choke)	2	1:20
	Jeremy Carroll	def.	Matthew Davis	Submission (rear-naked choke)	2	1:56
	Rhiannon Thompson	def.	Bec Rawlings	KO (head kick)	1	2:30
	Kahu Ropata	def.	Mark Mclean	TKO (punches)	2	0:39
	Adam Omme	def.	Elliot McCarthy	TKO (punches)	2	0:37
	Ethan Duniam	def.	Jarryd Holmes	Submission (armbar)	1	2:55
	Rob Wilkinson	def.	Dallas Wikinson Reed	TKO (punches)	1	0:00

== BRACE 11 ==
BRACE 11 was an event held on September 17, 2011, at Chandler Theatre, Brisbane, Australia.

=== Results ===
Main Card
Weight class				Method	Round	Time	Notes
	Sonny Brown	def.	Damien Brown	Submission (gogoplata)	3	3:01
	Jay Cobain	def.	Mark Tabone	Submission (guillotine choke)	1	1:58
	Ben Alloway	def.	Corey Nelson	Decision (majority)	3	5:00
	Jacob Mahony	def.	Chris Reddan	Submission (triangle choke)	1	0:00
	Chris Lokteff	def.	Josh Webb	KO (punch)	2	1:43
	Matt Powell	def.	Craig Lankerster	Submission (rear-naked choke)	1	3:29
	Mahu Powell	def.	Jaysen Brody	KO (punch)	1	0:49
	David Rodgers	def.	Sam Gardiner	Submission (armbar)	2	1:12
	Aaron Smith	def.	Daniel Field	Decision (split)	3	5:00
	Aaron Dyett	def.	Taipari Rikihana	Decision (split)	3	5:00

== BRACE 10 ==
BRACE 10 was an event held on August 27, 2011, at Convention Centre, Canberra, Australia.

=== Results ===
Main Card
Weight class				Method	Round	Time	Notes
	Dan Enson Hyatt	def.	Jon Leven	Decision (unanimous)	3	5:00
	Mike Turner	def.	Andrew Machin	Submission (rear-naked choke)	1	3:02
	Tim Radley	def.	Stepen Reeks	TKO (punches)	2	0:30
	Gerhard Voigt	def.	Christopher Murphy	Submission (rear-naked choke)	2	2:38
	Ali Kocak Mohammed	def.	Richard Kemp-Hay	TKO (punches)	3	1:26
	Luke Wrigley	def.	Sam Tebbutt	TKO (punches)	1	4:33
	Luke Standing	def.	Mike Aarts	Submission (armbar)	1	1:14
	Aarron Forsterling	def.	Sean Godkin	Submission (rear-naked choke)	1	2:36
	Duke Didier	def.	Chris Smith	Submission (guillotine choke)	1	0:43

== BRACE 9 ==
BACE 9 was an event held on June 4, 2011, at Townsville Entertainment Centre, Townsville, Australia.

=== Results ===
Main Card
Weight class				Method	Round	Time	Notes
	Nick Honstein	def.	Edwin Arana	Submission (rear-naked choke)	1	2:08
	Luke Hume	def.	Jacob Mahony	Submission (armbar})	1	3:38
	Mark Tabone	def.	Peter Day	Submission (rear-naked choke)	1	1:39
	Damien Brown	def.	Thomas Ruderman	Submission (rear-naked choke)	1	1:39
	Taipari Rikihana	def.	Kurtis Pegoraro	Submission (armbar)	1	4:51
	Zach Hook	def.	Trent Hudson	Submission (triangle choke)	1	1:15
	Adam Barrett	def.	Craig Lankester	Submission (rear-naked choke)	2	1:36
	Pat Promrangka	def.	Ricky Kutja	KO (punch)	1	0:11
	Mase Salesa	def.	Joshua Cimpa	TKO (punches)	1	0:39

== BRACE 8 ==
BRACE 8 was an event held on April 30, 2011 at Mansfield Taver, n Brisbane, Australia.

=== Results ===
Main Card
Weight class				Method	Round	Time	Notes
	Jay Cobain	def.	Semir Celikovic	Submission(arm-triangle choke)	2	1:17
	Brad Thompson	def.	Fredrico Blum	TKO (upkick and punches)	1	2:15
	Jacob Mahony	def.	Shannon Ross	Decision (unanimous)	3	5:00
	Joel Ormsby	def.	Travis Dean	Submission (armbar)	1	2:55
	Brad Murray	def.	Aaron Delaney	Ko (punches)	1	0:51
	Curtis Allen	def.	Rick Evans	TKO (punches)	3	1:24
	Taipari Rikihana	def.	Crag Gresham	TKO (punches	1	0:24
	Mike Aarts	def.	Chris Reddan	Submission (rear-naked choke)	1	2:09
	Matt George	def.	Trent Hudson	Decision (split)	3	5:00

== BRACE 7 ==
BRACE 7 was an event held in January 2011, at Convention Centre, Canberra, Australia.

=== Results ===
Main Card
Weight class				Method	Round	Time	Notes
	Gaz Rees	def.	Jade Jordan	KO (knee)	1	1:34
	Mark Menegus	def.	Jacob Mahony	Decision (unanimous)	3	5:00
	Andrew Machin	def.	Karl King	TKO (punches)	3	1:33
	Stephen Reeks	def.	Pat Promrangka	TKO (punches)	2	0:44
	E.J. Salilog	def.	Simon Fscarini	TKO (punches)	2	0:56
	Peter Cross	def.	Scott Bullock	Submission (rear-naked choke)	1	1:51
	Storm Oshyer	def.	Spencer Saisanavong	TKO (punches)	1	0:24
