= 2009 in BRACE =

Mixed martial arts events

Information
- First date: March 27, 2009
- Last date: August 15, 2009

Events
- Total events: 2

Fights
- Total fights: 19

Chronology
2009 in BRACE	2010 in BRACE

The year 2009 was the first year in the history of BRACE, a mixed martial arts promotion based in Australia. In 2009 BRACE held 2 events.

== Events list ==
#	Event title	Date	Arena	Location
2	BRACE 2	August 15, 2009	Broncos Leagues	Brisbane, Australia
1	BRACE 1	March 27, 2009	Broncos Leagues	Brisbane, Australia

== BRACE 2 ==
BRACE 2 was an event held on August 15, 2009, at Broncos Leagues in Brisbane, Australia

=== Results ===
Main Card
Weight class				Method	Round	Time	Notes
	Jade Jordan	def.	Ian Bone	TKO (punches)	3	1:31
	Tony Rossini	def.	Dan Enson Hyatt	Submission (rear-naked choke)	1	4:11
	James Tingle	def.	Tim Evans	KO (punches)	1	4:11
	Edwin Arana	def.	Matt Schiappandori	KO (puches)	1	3:54
	Chris kalliris	def.	Jimmy White	Submission (rear-naked choke)	1	1:56
	Jarrod Jenkins	def.	Rob Giuffrida	Decision (unanimous)	2	5:00
	Steve Micallef	def.	Jay Cobain	TKO (Doctor Stoppage)	1	1:14
	Fiona Muxlow	def.	Kyra Purcell	Decision (Majority)	2	5:00
	Aaron Raffin	def.	Jonny Drews	Decision (unanimous)	2	5:00

== BRACE 1 ==
BRACE 1 was an event held on March 27, 2009, at Broncos Leagues in Brisbane, Australia

=== Results ===
Main Card
Weight class				Method	Round	Time	Notes
	Matt Cain	def.	Jon Leven	Submission (triangle choke)	1	4:59
	Simon Bandarian	def.	Edwin Arana	Submission	1	2:54
	Sergio Cabra	def.	Chi Kit Cheung	Decision (unanimous)	2	5:00
	Tasman Knight	def.	Ben Forman	Submission	1	1:13
	Silvester Lidicky	def.	Kane Gehling	Decision (unanimous)	2	5:00
	Adam Celestino	def.	Jade Jordan	Decision (unanimous)	2	5:00
	Raad Brew Hyatt	def.	Bill Rees	Submission (kimura)	2	1:05
	Dan Enson Hyatt	def.	Stephen Cunnington	Darw	2	5:00
	Elijah Van	def.	Anthony Pagan	Submission (armbar)	1	1:41
	Tim Evans	def.	Steve Puplett	KO (punches)	2	0:38
