= Jonathan Meunier =

Canadian mixed martial arts fighter

- Born: August 4, 1987 (age 39); Quebec City, Quebec, Canada
- Nickname: The French Spider; District
- Height: 6 ft 3 in (1.91 m)
- Weight: 170 lb (77 kg; 12 st)
- Division: Welterweight
- Reach: 75.0 in (191 cm)
- Style: Kickboxing, Brazilian Jiu Jitsu
- Fighting out of: Quebec City, Quebec, Canada
- Team: Tristar Gym
- Trainer: Firas Zahabi; Philippe Dupont, Sandro Ferr
- Years active: 2013–present

Mixed martial arts record
- Total: 11
- Wins: 9
- By knockout: 5
- By submission: 2
- By decision: 2
- Losses: 2
- By knockout: 1
- By submission: 1

Other information
- Mixed martial arts record from Sherdog

Jonathan Meunier (born August 4, 1987) is a Canadian professional mixed martial artist who last competed in 2019. A professional mixed martial artist since 2013, Meunier competed in the Ultimate Fighting Championship.

== Background ==
Meunier was born in Quebec City, Quebec, Canada and started Taekwondo at an early age and later trained in kickboxing. He holds multiple titles in both kickboxing and MMA (amateur and pro).

He trains at Tristar Gym with his follow teammates Alex Garcia, Georges St-Pierre and Rory MacDonald in Montréal.

== Mixed martial arts career ==
=== Early career ===
Meunier made his professional MMA debut on October 5, 2013 at Quebec Mixed martial Arts League 1 in Canada, and amassed an undefeated record of 7-0 with all finishes prior to being signed by the UFC.

=== Ultimate Fighting Championship ===
Meunier made his UFC debut against Colby Covington on short notice, replacing his Tristar teammate Alex Garcia on June 18, 2016 at UFC Fight Night: MacDonald vs. Thompson in Ottawa, Canada. He lost the fight via submission in round three.

He next faced Richard Walsh on November 27, 2016 at UFC Fight Night: Whittaker vs. Brunson. He won the fight via unanimous decision with the scoreboard of 29-28, 30-27 and 30-27.

He was expected to face Li Jingliang on June 17, 2017 in Singapore at UFC Fight Night: Holm vs. Correia. He was pulled from the fight due to injury and was replaced by Frank Camacho.

New UFC ownership group Endeavor has taken a close look at the contractual practices of the organizations and has made several changes. The change that impacted the decision regarding Meunier had to do with precautionary measures. The UFC felt that a lack of data surrounding the conditions in Meunier’s medical history made them unable to secure his safety.

UFC released Meunier in February 2018 citing medical concerns of his brain injury.

=== Post-UFC career ===
Meunier joined TKO MMA not long late his termination from UFC, making his promotional debut against Menad Abella at TKO 43 on May 4, 2018. He won the fight via unanimous decision.

Next Meunier faced Nassourdine Imavov at ARES FC 1 on December 14, 2019. He lost the fight via technical knockout in the first round.

== Championships and accomplishments ==
Championships

Battlefield Fight League amateur middleweight kickboxing champion vs. Kevin Genereux

== Personal life ==
Meunier's idol is Anderson Silva whose nick name is "Spider", and as Meunier is a French Canadian, hence his nickname, "The French Spider." His earlier nick name "District" was named after his shop in Quebec City.

== Mixed martial arts record ==
Professional record breakdown
11 matches	9 wins	2 losses
By knockout	5	1
By submission	2	1
By decision	2	0

Res.	Record	Opponent	Method	Event	Date	Round	Time	Location	Notes
Loss	9–2	Nassourdine Imavov	TKO (punches)	ARES FC 1	December 14, 2019	1	4:27	Dakar, Senegal	Catchweight (176 lb) bout.
Win	9–1	Menad Abella	Decision (unanimous)	TKO 43 - Barriault vs. Kornberger	May 4, 2018	3	5:00	Quebec City, Canada	
Win	8–1	Richard Walsh	Decision (unanimous)	UFC Fight Night: Whittaker vs. Brunson	November 27, 2016	3	5:00	Melbourne, Australia	
Loss	7–1	Colby Covington	Submission (rear-naked choke)	UFC Fight Night: MacDonald vs. Thompson	June 18, 2016	3	0:54	Ottawa, Canada	
Win	7–0	Francis Charbonneau	Submission (rear-naked choke)	Quebec Mixed Martial Arts League 5	May 21, 2016	1	3:59	Quebec City, Canada	
Win	6–0	Stephen Martinez	TKO (elbows)	Z Promotions: Fight Night Medicine Hat	June 6, 2016	1	4:04	Medicine Hat, Alberta, Canada	
Win	5–0	Loyd Galindo	Submission (triangle choke)	Quebec Mixed Martial Arts League 4	June 6, 2015	2	4:05	Quebec City, Canada	
Win	4–0	Yannis Jacquet	TKO (knees and punches)	Fight4Pride Championship 3	March 28, 2015	1	N/A	Laval, Quebec, Canada	
Win	3–0	Dave Leduc	TKO (punches)	Hybrid Combat: Hybrid Pro Series 2	November 15, 2014	1	3:36	Gatineau, Quebec, Canada	
Win	2–0	David Hubert Therrien	TKO (punches)	Quebec Mixed Martial Arts League 2	June 21, 2014	1	3:19	Quebec City, Canada	
Win	1–0	Bruno-Pierre Duboi	TKO (punches)	Quebec Mixed Martial Arts League 1	October 5, 2013	1	4:29	Quebec City, Canada	

== See also ==
- List of current UFC fighters
- List of male mixed martial artists
- List of Canadian UFC fighters
