= Damien Brown (fighter) =

Australian mixed martial arts fighter

- Born: 25 December 1984 (age 41); Albury, Australia
- Other names: Beatdown
- Nationality: Australian
- Height: 5 ft 10 in (1.78 m)
- Weight: 71 kg (157 lb; 11 st 3 lb)
- Division: Welterweight; Lightweight
- Reach: 68.5 in (174 cm)
- Fighting out of: Brisbane, Australia
- Team: Base Training Centre
- Rank: Black belt in Zen Do Kai; Black belt in Brazilian Jiu-Jitsu under Dan Higgins
- Years active: 2010–present

Mixed martial arts record
- Total: 32
- Wins: 19
- By knockout: 3
- By submission: 9
- By decision: 7
- Losses: 13
- By knockout: 3
- By submission: 4
- By decision: 6

Other information
- Mixed martial arts record from Sherdog

Damien Brown (born 25 December 1984) is an Australian mixed martial artist who competes in the lightweight division. A professional since 2010, he has also competed for the Ultimate Fighting Championship, Rizin FF, BRACE, and Cage Warriors.

== Background ==
Brown was born in Albury, New South Wales, Australia. He is a full-time prison officer and a veteran of the Australian Army, serving as an infantry soldier, who was deployed to Afghanistan in 2007. He credits MMA training helping him to recover his post-traumatic stress and depression from his active service in the war zone. He would like to be the role model for the war veterans who suffer from PTSD, showing them the hopes and using the cage as the platform to advocate greater support for war veterans which they much deserved.

Brown started Zen Do Kai martial arts training when he was a kid. After return from military service from Afghanistan with some injuries, Brown joined a local Kickboxing school as part of the rehab program to improve his physical fitness and his professional career began one year later after he picked up BJJ training.

== Mixed martial arts career ==
=== Early career ===
Brown participated in various MMA promotions as such Australian Fighting Championship (AFC), BRACE, European-based Cage Warriors Fighting Championship. He held a 5 win streak prior signed by Ultimate Fighting Championship (UFC).

=== Ultimate Fighting Championship ===
Brown made his promotional debut on one week-notice debut in March 2016 at UFC Fight Night 85 against Alan Patrick and lost by decision (unanimous).

He took on Cesar Arzamendia, a veteran of the Ultimate Fighter Latin America 2, at UFC 201 in July 2016 and won by knockout in round 1.

At UFC Fight Night 101, Brown managed to steal a victory against Jon Tuck with a split decision.

Brown faced Vinc Pichel at UFC Fight Night 110 on 11 June 2017. He lost the fight via knockout in the first round.

Brown faced Frank Camacho on 19 November 2017, at UFC Fight Night: Werdum vs. Tybura. At the weight-ins, Camacho weighed in at 160 pounds, 4 pounds over the lightweight upper limit of 156 pounds. The bout proceeded at a catchweight and Camacho forfeited 30% of his purse to Brown. He lost the fight via split decision. This fight earned him Fight of the Night bonus.

Brown faced Dong Hyun Ma on 11 February 2018 at UFC 221. He lost the fight by split decision.

On July 2, 2018, it was announced that Brown was released from UFC.

=== Post-UFC career ===
After his release from the UFC, Brown signed a two-fight contract with Rizin FF. Brown made his promotional debut against fellow UFC veteran Daron Cruickshank at Rizin 14 on December 31, 2018. He won the fight via submission in the first round.

As the second and last fight of his prevailing contract, Brown faced Koji Takeda at Rizin 15 on April 21, 2019. Brown won the fight via unanimous decision.

Riding a two-win streak, Brown signed a new contract with Rizin and joined the 2019 Lightweight Grand Prix. In the opening round of the grand prix, Brown faced Tofiq Musayev at Rizin 19 on October 12, 2019. Brown lost the fight via TKO in the first round.

=== Beatdown Promotions ===
Brown currently heads the promotion ‘Beatdown Promotions’, an Australian based promotion that looks to provide amateur and professional fighters from Australia and New Zealand an opportunity to expose themselves to a larger audience.

== Championships and accomplishments ==
- Ultimate Fighting Championship
  - Fight of the Night (One time) vs. Frank Camacho
  - UFC.com Awards
    - 2017: Ranked #5 Fight of the Year vs. Frank Camacho

== Mixed martial arts record ==
Professional record breakdown
32 matches	19 wins	13 losses
By knockout	3	3
By submission	9	4
By decision	7	6

Res.	Record	Opponent	Method	Event	Date	Round	Time	Location	Notes
Loss	19–13	Tofiq Musayev	TKO (head kick and punches)	Rizin 19	12 October 2019	1	4:14	Osaka, Japan	2019 Rizin Lightweight Grand Prix Quarterfinal.
Win	19–12	Koji Takeda	Decision (unanimous)	Rizin 15	21 April 2019	3	5:00	Yokohama, Japan	
Win	18–12	Daron Cruickshank	Submission (guillotine choke)	Rizin 14	31 December 2018	1	4:19	Saitama, Japan	
Loss	17–12	Dong Hyun Ma	Decision (split)	UFC 221	11 February 2018	3	5:00	Perth, Australia	
Loss	17–11	Frank Camacho	Decision (split)	UFC Fight Night: Werdum vs. Tybura	19 November 2017	3	5:00	Sydney, Australia	Catchweight bout (160 lbs); Camacho missed weight. Fight of the Night.
Loss	17–10	Vinc Pichel	KO (punches)	UFC Fight Night: Lewis vs. Hunt	11 June 2017	1	3:37	Auckland, New Zealand	
Win	17–9	Jon Tuck	Decision (split)	UFC Fight Night: Whittaker vs. Brunson	26 November 2016	3	5:00	Melbourne, Australia	
Win	16–9	Cesar Arzamendia	TKO (punches)	UFC 201	30 July 2016	1	2:27	Atlanta, Georgia, United States	
Loss	15–9	Alan Patrick	Decision (unanimous)	UFC Fight Night: Hunt vs. Mir	20 March 2016	3	5:00	Brisbane, Australia	
Win	15–8	Pumau Campbell	TKO (punches)	XFC 26	20 February 2016	3	1:14	Brisbane, Australia	Defended the XFC Lightweight Championship.
Win	14–8	Ben Games	Submission (rear-naked choke)	BRACE 37	21 November 2015	2	1:57	Canberra, Australia	Won the BRACE Lightweight Championship. BRACE Lightweight Tournament Final
Win	13–8	Grant Toatoa	Submission (guillotine choke)	NZFC 1: A New Beginning	17 October 2015	1	2:29	Christchurch, New Zealand	
Win	12–8	Abel Brites	Submission (guillotine choke)	BRACE 36	19 September 2015	1	0:17	Sydney, Australia	BRACE Lightweight Tournament Semifinal.
Win	11–8	Shane Young	Decision (majority)	XFC 23	28 February 2015	5	5:00	Brisbane, Australia	Won the vacant XFC Lightweight Championship.
Loss	10–8	Ricky Rea	Submission (rear-naked choke)	FightWorld Cup 18	2 August 2014	1	3:28	Nerang, Australia	Welterweight bout.
Loss	10–7	Tim Wilde	Decision (unanimous)	CWFC 69	7 July 2014	3	5:00	London, England	
Loss	10–6	Paul Redmond	Decision (unanimous)	CWFC 65	1 March 2014	3	5:00	Dublin, Ireland	
Loss	10–5	Julien Boussuge	Decision (unanimous)	CWFC 61	13 December 2013	3	5:00	Amman, Jordan	
Win	10–4	Scott MacGregor	Submission (armbar)	K.O. Martial Arts: Adrenalin-Unleashed	29 June 2013	1	4:58	Eatons Hill, Australia	
Loss	9–4	Yusuke Kasuya	Submission (armbar)	Legend FC 11	27 April 2013	3	4:47	Kuala Lumpur, Malaysia	
Win	9–3	Rob Hill	Decision (unanimous)	BRACE 19	16 February 2013	3	5:00	Sydney, Australia	
Win	8–3	Haotian Wu	Decision (unanimous)	Legend FC 9	16 June 2012	3	5:00	Macau, SAR, China	
Win	7–3	Luke Hume	Decision (unanimous)	Nitro MMA 5	24 March 2012	1	0:57	Logan City, Australia	
Loss	6–3	Koji Ando	Submission (reverse triangle choke)	Legend FC 7	11 Feb 2012	1	2:27	Macau, SAR, China	
Loss	6–2	Patrick Iodice	TKO (punches)	FightWorld Cup 10	19 November 2011	1	0:07	Nerang, Australia	
Loss	6–1	Sonny Brown	Submission (gogoplata)	BRACE 11	17 September 2011	3	3:01	Brisbane, Australia	
Win	6–0	Gokhan Turkyilmaz	TKO (corner stoppage)	Nitro 3	9 July 2011	3	3:54	Queensland, Australia	
Win	5–0	Thomas Ruderman	Submission (rear-naked choke)	BRACE 9	4 June 2011	1	1:39	Townsville, Australia	
Win	4–0	Luke Stevens	Decision (unanimous)	Nitro MMA 2	19 March 2011	3	5:00	Logan City, Australia	
Win	3–0	Jay Thompson	Submission (armbar)	Golden Lion Promotions: Christmas Bash 2010	18 Dec 2010	1	1:45	Townsville, Australia	
Win	2–0	Kenny Yeung	Decision (unanimous)	AFC 1	12 November 2010	3	3:00	Melbourne, Australia	
Win	1–0	Tim Radley	Submission (rear-naked choke)	Fate MMA: Beyond Human Control	26 June 2010	1	N/A	Beenleigh, Australia	

== See also ==
- List of male mixed martial artists
