= Ben Alloway =

Australia mixed martial arts fighter

- Born: 19 February 1981 (age 45)
- Other names: Benny Blanco
- Nationality: Australian
- Height: 5 ft 10 in (178 cm)
- Weight: 170 lb (77 kg; 12 st)
- Division: Welterweight
- Reach: 76 in (193 cm)
- Fighting out of: Gold Coast, Australia
- Team: Fiore MMA; Axis Fight Academy; Potential Unlimited MMA (PUMMA)
- Years active: 2010–present

Mixed martial arts record
- Total: 28
- Wins: 19
- By knockout: 8
- By submission: 6
- By decision: 5
- Losses: 9
- By knockout: 2
- By submission: 5
- By decision: 2

Other information
- Mixed martial arts record from Sherdog

Ben Alloway (born 19 February 1981) is an Australian mixed martial artist. A professional MMA competitor since 2010, he was a competitor on The Ultimate Fighter: The Smashes. Alloway fought for the UFC in the welterweight division.

== Mixed martial arts career ==
=== Early career ===
Alloway compiled a 12–3 professional record competing mostly in Australia before joining The Ultimate Fighter.

Alloway was forced to work outside of martial arts for most of his early career, but after signing with the UFC was able to devote 100% of his time to his MMA training.

=== The Ultimate Fighter ===
Alloway was chosen to compete on The Ultimate Fighter: The Smashes. In his first fight in the house, Alloway knocked out Valentino Petrescu early in the second round to advance to the quarterfinals.

In his quarterfinal fight, Alloway came up short, losing via split decision to Brad Scott.

=== Ultimate Fighting Championship ===
Alloway made his UFC debut against castmate Manuel Rodriguez on 15 December 2012 at UFC on FX 6. He won the fight via KO in the first round.

Alloway faced promotional newcomer Ryan LaFlare on 6 April 2013 at UFC on Fuel TV 9. He lost the fight via unanimous decision.

Alloway next faced TUF 17 contestant Zak Cummings at UFC Fight Night 27. He lost the fight via submission in the first round, and was cut from the UFC.

=== Cage Warriors Fighting Championships ===
Following his release from the UFC, Alloway signed a five-fight deal with leading European promotion Cage Warriors

Alloway made his Cage Warriors debut against Jack Mason on 1 March 2014 at Cage Warriors 65. He won the fight via unanimous decision.

=== Absolute Championship Berkut ===
At ACB he lost the first fight to Sharaf Davlatmurodov at ACB 41 on 15 July 2016 via TKO in the second round.

Alloway faced Sergey Khandozhko at ACB 48 Revenge on 22 October 2016. He won the fight via submission (rear-naked choke) in the third round.

Alloway faced Ismail Naurdiev at ACB 60 on 13 May 2017. He lost the fight via knockout in the first round.

== Championships and accomplishments ==
- BRACE
  - BRACE Welterweight Championship – (One time, current)
- Ultimate Fighting Championship
  - The Ultimate Fighter: The Smashes – Fight of the Season
  - Knockout of the Night – (One Time)

== Mixed martial arts record ==
Professional record breakdown
28 matches	19 wins	9 losses
By knockout	8	2
By submission	6	5
By decision	5	2

Res.	Record	Opponent	Method	Event	Date	Round	Time	Location	Notes
Loss	19–9	Steve Kennedy	Submission (kimura)	Eternal MMA 44	11 May 2019	2	1:35	Perth, Western Australia, Australia	
Loss	19–8	Ismail Naurdiev	TKO (body kick)	ACB 60	13 May 2017	1	2:24	Vienna, Austria	
Win	19–7	Sergey Khandozhko	Submission (rear-naked choke)	ACB 48: Revenge	22 October 2016	3	3:09	Moscow, Russia	
Win	18–7	Matt Vaile	Decision (unanimous)	CITC – Carnage in the Cage 7	17 September 2016	3	5:00	Mackay, Queensland, Australia	
Loss	17–7	Sharaf Davlatmurodov	TKO (body kick)	ACB 41: The Path to Triumph	15 July 2016	2	2:39	Sochi, Russia	
Win	17–6	Theo Christakos	KO (punches)	BRACE 37: 2015 Championship Grand Final	21 November 2015	3	1:28	Canberra, Australia	For the BRACE Welterweight Championship.
Win	16–6	Rick Alchin	Submission (guillotine choke)	BRACE 36	19 September 2015	2	3:03	Sydney, Australia	BRACE Welterweight Tournament Semi-finals.
Win	15–6	Tristan Murphy	TKO (punches and elbows)	Eternal MMA 10	30 May 2015	2	1:20	Gold Coast, Queensland, Australia	
Loss	14–6	Mohsen Bahari	Decision (split)	Cage Warriors Fighting Championship 69	7 June 2014	3	5:00	London, England	
Win	14–5	Jack Mason	Decision (unanimous)	Cage Warriors Fighting Championship 65	1 March 2014	3	5:00	Dublin, Leinster, Ireland	
Loss	13–5	Zak Cummings	Submission (d'arce choke)	UFC Fight Night: Condit vs. Kampmann 2	28 August 2013	1	4:19	Indianapolis, Indiana, United States	
Loss	13–4	Ryan LaFlare	Decision (unanimous)	UFC on Fuel TV: Mousasi vs. Latifi	6 April 2013	3	5:00	Stockholm, Sweden	
Win	13–3	Manuel Rodriguez	KO (front kick and punches)	UFC on FX: Sotiropoulos vs. Pearson	15 December 2012	1	4:57	Gold Coast, Queensland, Australia	Knockout of the Night
Win	12–3	Rod Staader	TKO (punches)	BRACE 15	28 April 2012	2	3:39	Coffs Harbour, New South Wales, Australia	
Win	11–3	Mauro Chimento Jr.	Decision (unanimous)	Cage Warriors Fight Night 3	11 February 2012	3	5:00	Beirut, Lebanon	
Win	10–3	Rashid Abdullah	Submission (armbar)	FMMMA- Fight Me MMA	13 January 2012	2	4:18	St. Charles, Missouri, United States	
Win	9–3	Dan Hyatt	Submission (triangle choke)	BRACE 13	19 November 2011	1	3:49	Townsville, Queensland, Australia	
Win	8–3	Corey Nelson	Decision (majority)	BRACE 11	17 September 2011	3	5:00	Brisbane, Queensland, Australia	
Loss	7–3	Ben Mortimer	Submission (armbar)	Nitro MMA- Nitro 3	9 June 2011	3	1:49	Logan City, Queensland, Australia	
Loss	7–2	Robert Whittaker	Submission (rear-naked choke)	Cage Fighting Championship 17	3 June 2011	2	4:07	Gold Coast, Queensland, Australia	
Win	7–1	Jon Leven	Submission (rear-naked choke)	Fate MMA- Fate 2	19 February 2011	3	3:33	Beenleigh, Queensland, Australia	
Win	6–1	Gokhan Turkyilmaz	TKO (punches)	CWA – Cage Wars Australia 5	11 December 2010	3	3:33	Gold Coast, Queensland, Australia	
Win	5–1	Michael Osborn	TKO (punches)	C3 Fights – Slammin Jammin Weekend 6	22 October 2010	3	2:29	Newkirk, Oklahoma, United States	
Loss	4–1	Luke Peters	Submission (guillotine choke)	BRACE 5	14 August 2010	1	4:50	Brisbane, Queensland, Australia	
Win	4–0	Atal Kakar	Submission (rear-naked choke)	XMMA 2 – ANZ VS USA	31 July 2010	1	1:41	Sydney, Australia	
Win	3–0	Rick Evans	TKO (punches)	Fate MMA – Beyond Human Control	26 June 2010	1	N/A	Beenleigh, Queensland, Australia	
Win	2–0	Jordan Wainohu	TKO (punches)	FWC5 – Call To Arms	10 April 2010	2	2:56	Nerang, Queensland, Australia	
Win	1–0	Ben Pepper	Decision (unanimous)	UMMA 4 – Toowoomba	26 February 2010	3	5:00	Toowoomba, Queensland, Australia	

== Mixed martial arts exhibition record ==
Professional record breakdown
2 matches	1 win	1 loss
By knockout	1	0
By submission	0	0
By decision	0	1

Res.	Record	Opponent	Method	Event	Date	Round	Time	Location	Notes
Loss	1–1	Brad Scott	Decision (split)	The Ultimate Fighter: The Smashes	2012	3	5:00	Australia	
Win	1–0	Valentino Petrescu	TKO (punches)	The Ultimate Fighter: The Smashes	2012	2	0:42	Australia	
