= Richard Walsh (fighter) =

Australian martial artist

- Born: Richard Walsh; 1 December 1988 (age 37)
- Other names: Filthy Rich
- Nationality: Australian
- Height: 6 ft 0 in (183 cm)
- Weight: 170 lb (77 kg; 12 st 2 lb)
- Division: Welterweight
- Reach: 73 in (185 cm)
- Fighting out of: Sydney, Australia
- Team: VT1 Mixed Martial Arts Academy & Gracie Academy Chatswood
- Rank: Black belt in Brazilian Jiu-Jitsu
- Years active: 2009–2016

Mixed martial arts record
- Total: 15
- Wins: 9
- By knockout: 4
- By submission: 1
- By decision: 4
- Losses: 5
- By knockout: 1
- By submission: 1
- By decision: 3
- No contests: 1

Other information
- Mixed martial arts record from Sherdog

Richard Walsh (born 1 December 1988) is an Australian mixed martial artist. He previously competed in the Welterweight division of the UFC. He was also a semi-finalist on The Ultimate Fighter: Canada vs. Australia.

== Background ==
Walsh graduated from St. Ignatius College in Sydney in 2006. He went on to complete a bachelor's degree in construction at the University of New South Wales before going to study abroad at the Georgia Institute of Technology in Atlanta. Walsh also enrolled in postgraduate law, but chose instead to pursue mixed martial arts. He trains out of VT1 Martial Arts in Chatswood.

== Mixed martial arts career ==
=== Amateur career ===
Walsh competed extensively before becoming a professional athlete. He has fought in both amateur Muay Thai and western boxing where he holds records of 10–0 and 6–0 respectively. He is also a former Brazilian jiu-jitsu state champion.

=== Early professional career ===
Walsh made his professional mixed martial arts debut on 29 May 2009 when he defeated Tahu Pauro by first-round submission. He went on to fight seven more times, four of which ended in first round victories, before auditioning for TUF: Nations.

=== The Ultimate Fighter ===
On 5 December 2013, it was announced that Walsh had been selected as one of the welterweight fighters representing Australia for The Ultimate Fighter Nations: Canada vs. Australia. The reality show was led by Patrick Côté and Kyle Noke and premiered in early 2014.

In episode five of the show Walsh, who was placed on Team Noke, faced Matt DesRoches from Team Cote. Dominating the fight from start to finish, Walsh scored a unanimous decision and earned the second win for his team. He proceeded to the semi-finals of the competition.

In the semi-finals, Walsh faced the much-touted Olivier Aubin-Mercier. Walsh was defeated in the first round via rear-naked choke.

=== Ultimate Fighting Championship ===
Walsh fought former teammate Chris Indich on the undercard of The Ultimate Fighter Nations Finale: Bisping vs. Kennedy. The event took place on 16 April 2014 at the Colisée Pepsi in Quebec City, Quebec, Canada. Walsh was able to control the fight for three rounds and was awarded a unanimous decision as a result.

Walsh faced Kiichi Kunimoto at UFC Fight Night 52. He lost the fight via controversial split decision. Many prominent MMA sites and fighters scored the bout in Walsh's favour given his dominance in the first two rounds of the fight.

Walsh faced Alan Jouban on 28 February 2015 at UFC 184. Jouban won the fight via knockout in the first round.

Walsh faced Steve Kennedy on 15 November 2015 at UFC 193. He won the fight by unanimous decision.

Walsh faced Viscardi Andrade on 20 March 2016 at UFC Fight Night 85. He lost the fight by unanimous decision.

Walsh next faced Jonathan Meunier on 27 November 2016 at UFC Fight Night 101. He lost the fight via unanimous decision.

In May 2017, Walsh was released from the company.

=== Post Ultimate Fighting Championship ===
Walsh was awarded his black belt in Brazilian jiu-jitsu in January 2018. He is currently working at the UFC Performance Institute in Shanghai.

== Personal life ==
Walsh trained at the same gym as fellow UFC fighter and TUF 20 alumni Alex Chambers prior to the latter's departure in mid 2015. Unlike Chambers, Walsh originally had no intention of competing. However, he has been a longtime fan of MMA and combat sports which finally led to his decision to turn professional.

== Mixed martial arts record ==
Professional record breakdown
| 14 matches | 9 wins | 4 losses |
| By knockout | 4 | 1 |
| By submission | 1 | 1 |
| By decision | 4 | 2 |
| No contests | 1 | |

| Res. | Record | Opponent | Method | Event | Date | Round | Time | Location | Notes |
|---|---|---|---|---|---|---|---|---|---|
| Loss | 9–4 (1) | Jonathan Meunier | Decision (unanimous) | UFC Fight Night: Whittaker vs. Brunson | 27 November 2016 | 3 | 5:00 | Melbourne, Australia | |
| NC | 9–3 (1) | Viscardi Andrade | No Contest (overturned) | UFC Fight Night: Hunt vs. Mir | 20 March 2016 | 3 | 5:00 | Brisbane, Australia | Originally a unanimous decision for Andrade, overturned when he tested positive for stanozolol. |
| Win | 9–3 | Steve Kennedy | Decision (unanimous) | UFC 193 | 15 November 2015 | 3 | 5:00 | Melbourne, Australia | |
| Loss | 8–3 | Alan Jouban | KO (elbow and punches) | UFC 184 | 28 February 2015 | 1 | 2:19 | Los Angeles, California, United States | |
| Loss | 8–2 | Kiichi Kunimoto | Decision (split) | UFC Fight Night: Hunt vs. Nelson | 20 September 2014 | 3 | 5:00 | Saitama, Japan | |
| Win | 8–1 | Chris Indich | Decision (unanimous) | The Ultimate Fighter Nations Finale: Bisping vs. Kennedy | 16 April 2014 | 3 | 5:00 | Quebec City, Quebec, Canada | |
| Win | 7–1 | Aaron Forsterling | Decision (unanimous) | BRACE 18 | 21 December 2012 | 3 | 5:00 | Canberra, Australia | |
| Win | 6–1 | Amer Hussein | TKO (punches) | Proud Warrior Productions 5: Magalhaes vs. Brown | 14 September 2012 | 1 | | Sydney, Australia | |
| Win | 5–1 | Callan Potter | KO (knee) | Gladiators Cage Fighting: Series 2 | 31 August 2012 | 1 | 4:15 | Cronulla, Australia | |
| Win | 4–1 | Josh Russell | KO (punches) | War on the North Shore 15 | 17 April 2012 | 1 | 1:10 | Kallangur, Australia | |
| Win | 3–1 | Adriano Magnani | TKO (punches) | Pro Cagefighting 1: Gladiators | 12 June 2011 | 1 | 4:30 | Sydney, Australia | |
| Loss | 2–1 | Robert Whittaker | Submission (rear-naked choke) | Cage Fighting Championships 11 | 20 November 2009 | 2 | 2:40 | Sydney, Australia | |
| Win | 2–0 | Blake Doering | Decision (unanimous) | War on the North Shore 10 | 25 July 2009 | 3 | 5:00 | Sydney, Australia | |
| Win | 1–0 | Tahu Pauro | Submission (rear-naked choke) | Elite Fight Night 8 | 29 May 2009 | 1 | 3:30 | Penrith, Australia | |

== See also ==
- List of current UFC fighters
- List of male mixed martial artists
