= Southport RSL =

Coordinates: 27.9706°S 153.4148°E

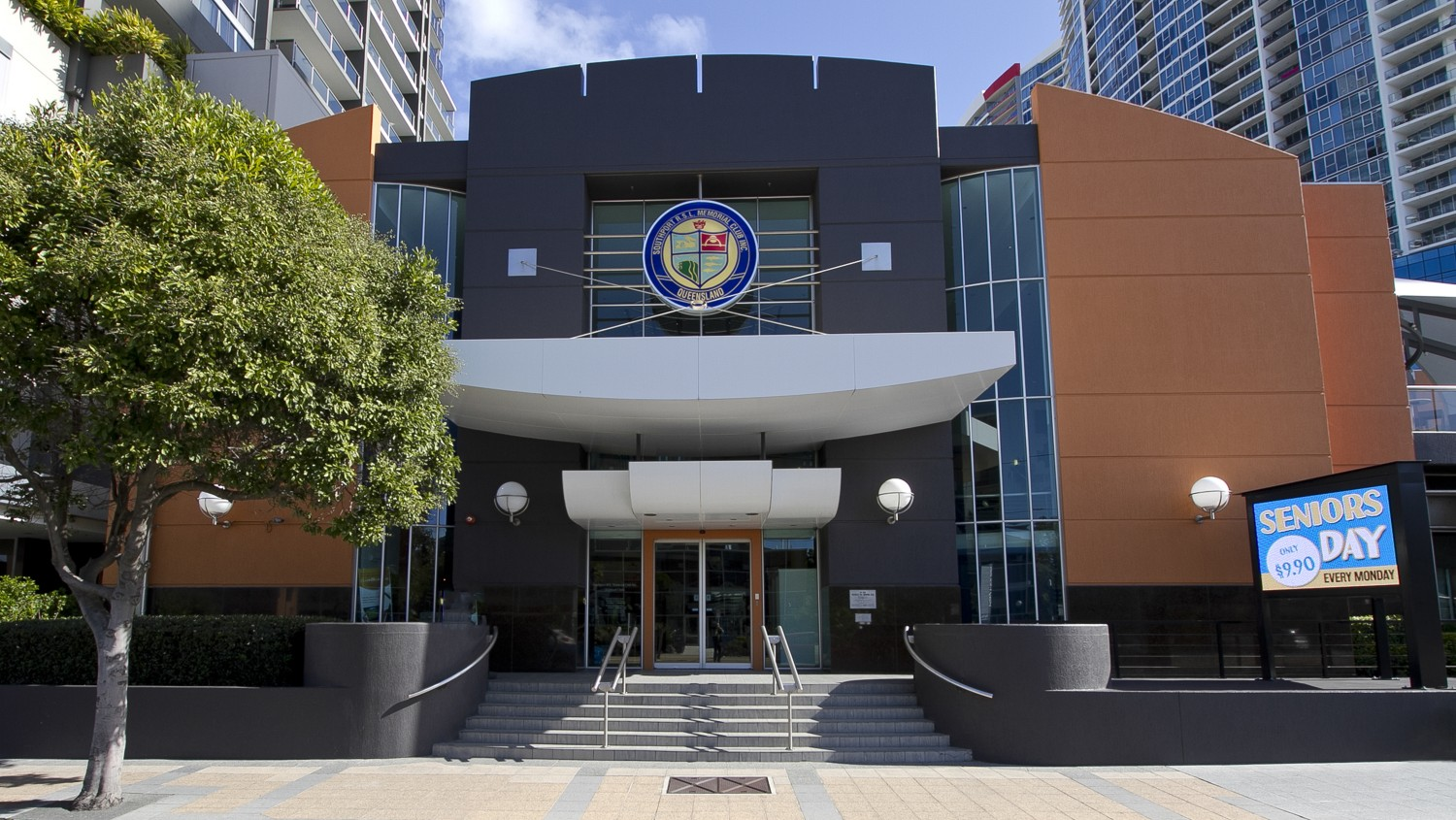
Entrance to the Southport RSL Memorial Club, 2017

The Southport RSL is a sub-branch of Returned and Services League of Australia (RSL) in Southport, Gold Coast in South East Queensland, Australia. Their building is the Southport Bowls Club, located in Marine Parade, Southport. The Southport RSL is a registered not-for-profit charity.

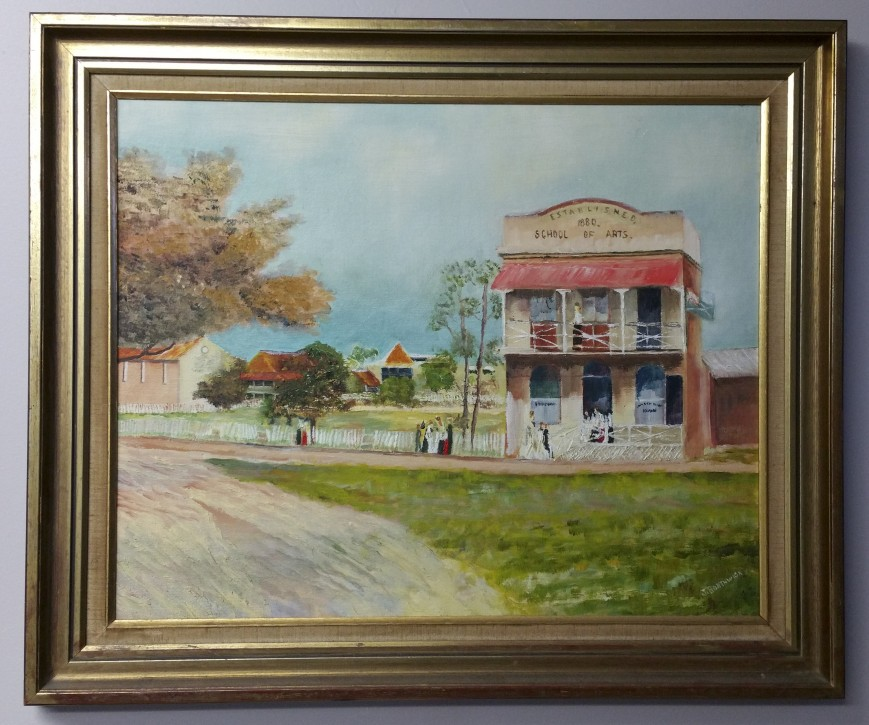
Former Southport School of Arts

== History ==
In November 1881, it was proposed to construct a school of arts at Southport. In October 1883, the Queensland Government set aside a reserve for the School of Arts and by the end of the month the building was completed.

In April 1919 a meeting of returned soldiers from World War I decided to establish a Southport sub-branch of the Returned Sailors and Soldiers Imperial League of Australia.

In August 1938 the Southport branch of the Returned Soldiers' League proposed to take over the School of Arts building, which had been modernised in 1934, to continue its role as a School of Arts as well as being a clubhouse for the Southport RSL. In December 1938, a meeting of the subscribers of the School of Arts (which was short of funds) agreed to hand over the building to the RSL in return for the RSL renovating the building, upgrading the furniture and expanding the library. The RSL took over the building to accommodate its growing membership and established a women's auxiliary.

In 1952 the Southport RSL planned to build a new 2-storey brick building in front of the existing building to be completed in about 18 months. However, it was not completed until 1956. The brick building was subsequently refurbished on a number of occasions with a major renovation in 1996.

== Services ==
The public services offered by the Southport RSL include a restaurant, cafe and bars as well as entertainment and a gaming room. These services provide the funding for the Southport RSL to deliver on its primary mission, which is to support current and former military personnel and their families through practical assistance with matters of physical and mental well-being, being able to access pensions and other government assistance, and by advocacy for better facilities and services.

== Memorials ==
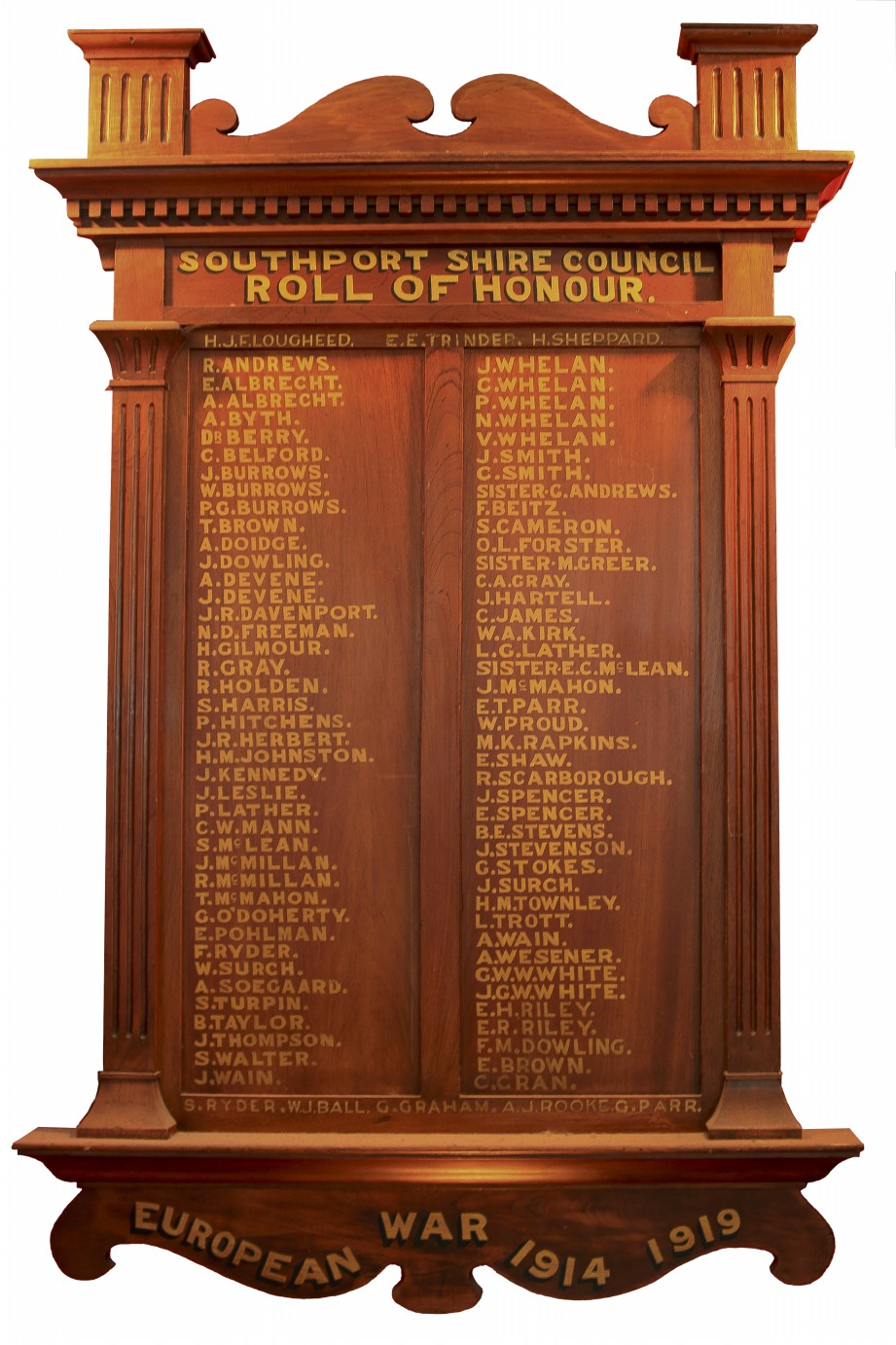
World War I Roll of Honour by the Southport Shire Council

At the Southport RSL building there are two war memorials, the Roll of Honour for World War I service created by the Southport Shire Council (a forerunner of the present Gold Coast City Council) which hangs inside the building and the Southport RSL Cenotaph which is outside the building on the corner of Scarborough and Lawson Streets flanked by flagpoles.

The Roll of Honour was first proposed and agreed upon at a meeting of the Southport Shire Council in July 1916. The roll was unveiled by James Tolmie, as part of the annual Southport Show in September 1916 (which was donating all its proceeds to the Red Cross). Tolmie was then the Leader of the Opposition in the Queensland Legislative Assembly, but more pertinent to the unveiling, he had enlisted at age 53 in the Australian Imperial Force and, as a major, was in command of a troop ship.

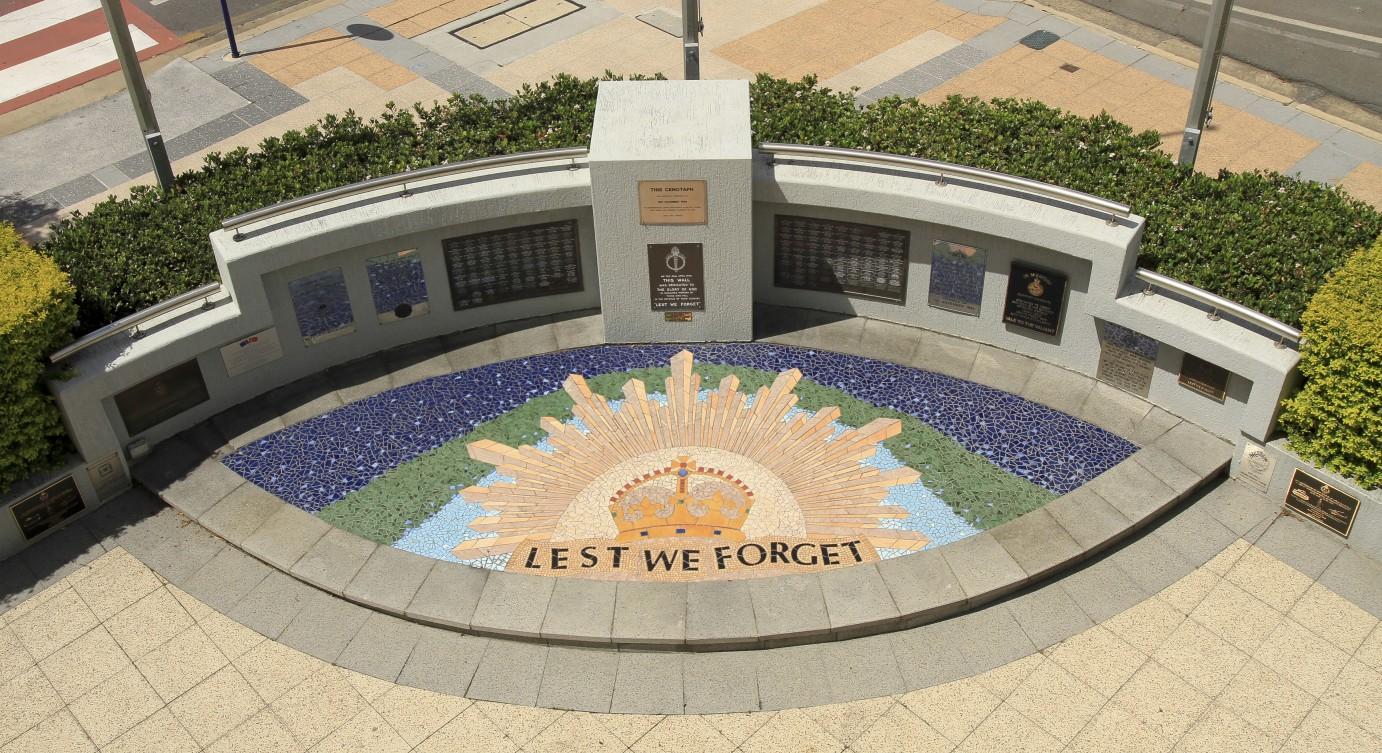
Southport RSL Cenotaph on the corner of Scarborough and Lawson Streets, Southport, 2017

To accommodate larger numbers of people, Southport RSL holds its major commemorative services such as the annual Anzac Day ceremonies at the Southport War Memorial and Memorial Gates at ANZAC Park in the Broadwater Parklands. After the pre-dawn march and dawn ceremony at the Southport War Memorial on Anzac Day, a "gunfire breakfast" (includes rum) is served at the Southport RSL clubhouse. A second ceremony is held mid-morning.

The Southport War Memorial (originally erected at the end of Nerang Street beside the Broadwater) was unveiled on 25 April (Anzac Day) 1922 by John Appel, the local Member of the Queensland Legislative Assembly in the presence of the largest-ever crowd in Southport. The memorial is 18 feet (5.5 m) and consists of a base surmounted to digger statue (both made of Helidon sandstone) with marble tablets on the sides of the base listing the names of those who died.
