= North Sydney Leagues Club =

General information
- Coordinates: 33°49′18″S 151°12′31″E
North Sydney Leagues Club

The North Sydney Leagues Club (rebranded as Norths) is a licensed club located in Abbott Street, Cammeray. The club was established in 1955 by the district's football club, the North Sydney Bears, in a house in the Sydney suburb of Neutral Bay. The club has occupied its current premises since 1964.

In the fifty years the new building has stood, a number of redesigns and refurbishments have taken place. In 2014, facilities comprised two dining areas, function rooms, a 530-seat auditorium, a fitness and wellness centre, indoor and outdoor lounge areas, a bottle shop, a TAB, two squash courts, a courtesy bus service, a members rewards program and a multi-level car park for 320 vehicles. In 2014 club membership was 2,500.

In 1996, Norths merged with the North Sydney Bowling Club, which was established in 1888 and is the second oldest club (by one day) in Australia. Norths also amalgamated with Seagulls Club, a border club at Tweed Heads on the far north coast of New South Wales, the oldest provincial rugby league club in Australia.

In recent years the wider Norths Group, or Norths Collective as it is branded, has also taken ownership by amalgamating with smaller clubs in Sydney's north including The Verandah Beacroft, The Alcott Lane Cove and The Bowlo Bangalow. Across all venues, the Norths Collective has 65,000 paid members. It is not yet known whether the Norths Group will sponsor, hold equity or provide board representation to the new Perth Bears National Rugby League team.

== See also ==
- List of restaurants in Australia
