= Big Top Sydney =

Entertainment and concert venue in Luna Park, Sydney

The Big Top
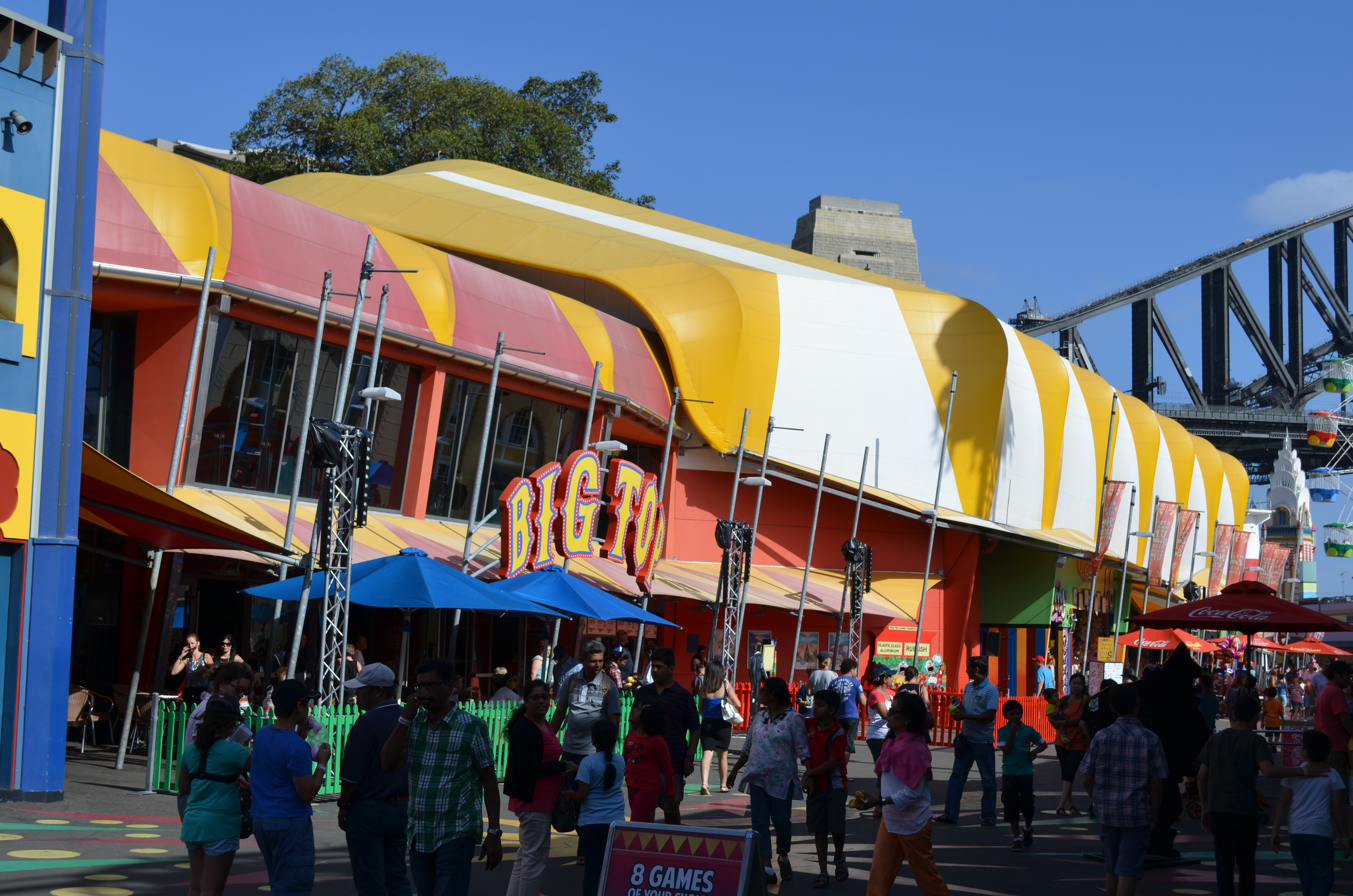
- Entrance to venue, 2013
- Full name: The Big Top at Luna Park Sydney
- Former names: Luna Circus (planning/construction)
- Address: 1 Olympic Dr, Milsons Point NSW, 2061
- Location: Luna Park, Milsons Point, New South Wales
- Owner: Oscars Group
- Operator: Luna Park Sydney
- Capacity: 2,950 (pre-refurbishment) 1,000 (post refurbishment)

Construction
- Groundbreaking: 7 February 2003
- Opened: 2 April 2004
- Cost: $20 million ($33.1 million in 2022 dollars)
- Architect: Hassell
- Structural engineer: MacDonald Contracting
- Services engineer: Douglas Partners
- General contractor: Cordell Construction

Website
- Venue Website

The Big Top (also known as the Big Top Auditorium and The Arena; commonly known as Big Top Sydney) is a multi-purpose functions venue located within Luna Park Sydney. Opening in 2004, the venue was a part of the amusement park’s 2003 redevelopment plan. The venue was refurbished in 2023 to install projection and holographic technology.

It has housed notable events such as the 2005 MTV Australia Video Music Awards, Come Together Music Festival and the 2013 Sydney Darts Masters.

== History ==
The venue was originally proposed in 1999 by Metro Edgley Pty Ltd. as the replacement for the troubled Big Dipper. Known as Luna Circus, the building was proposed as a venue for circus acts and a possible site for a permanent Cirque du Soleil show. Plans were underway to begin construction in 2000, opening in 2001. However, the proposal was not approved by the North Sydney Council until December 2002. Construction began in February 2003 and was completed in December.

The Big Top stands in place of the park's former Ghost Train, which burnt down in the 1979 Sydney Ghost Train fire that claimed seven lives. The fire's victims are memorialised with a plaque at the Big Top entrance.

An opening celebration concert was held 2 April 2004. It was hosted by Simon Burke and featured performances by Caroline O'Connor, Marina Prior and David Campbell. The first official event held at the venue was a performance of Sunset Boulevard (featuring Judi Connelli and Michael Cormick) on 3 April 2004.

In 2023, the venue received an extensive interior refurbishment. The main auditorium was fitted with 360 projectors, LED screens and holographic technology, allowing for the showing of "immersive experiences". The refurbished venue opened on 22 December 2023, with its premiere show named Dream Circus.

Since Big Top's refurbishment, it has been primarily utilised for upcharge pre-recorded shows targeted at Luna Park guests. As of 2025, Big Top's official website advertises the site as a corporate functions venue.

Venue configurations/capacities (2025)
Layout	Capacity
Round	450
Classroom	570
Ovals	600
Theatre	750
Cocktail	1,000

== Performers ==
- The Amity Affliction
- Architects
- Avenged Sevenfold
- ATEEZ
- B.A.P
- Bastille
- Benee
- Boyz II Men
- Bruno Mars
- Bullet for My Valentine
- Calvin Harris
- Chicago
- DMX
- Dua Lipa
- The Dandy Warhols
- The Darkness
- The Doobie Brothers
- Franz Ferdinand
- The Fray
- Goldfrapp
- Good Charlotte
- got7
- Ice Cube
- iKon
- Incubus
- INXS
- Ja Rule
- Jessie J
- King Gizzard & the Lizard Wizard
- Korn
- Kylie Minogue
- Lily Allen
- Meghan Trainor
- Mýa
- New Found Glory
- Nick Cave and the Bad Seeds
- Nine Inch Nails
- Paramore
- The Prodigy
- Queens of the Stone Age
- Rita Ora
- Rob Zombie
- Scissor Sisters
- The Script
- Sean Paul
- Seventeen
- Slayer
- The Smashing Pumpkins
- Soundgarden
- Spacey Jane
- Steel Panther
- Stray Kids
- Switchfoot
- The Try Guys
- Vengaboys
- VIXX
- You Me at Six
