= AIS Arena =

Multipurpose arena in Canberra, Australia

- The Palace
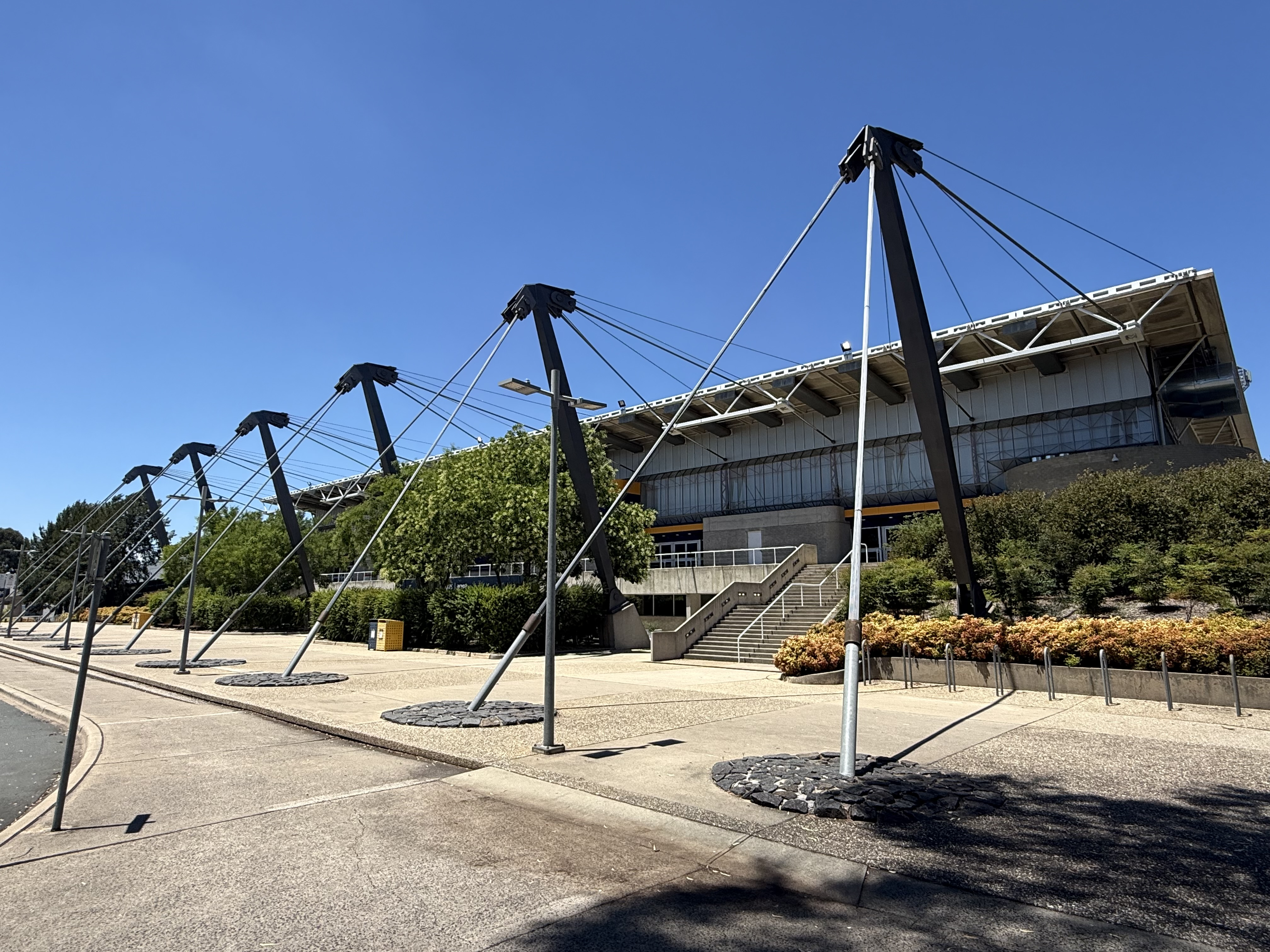
- AIS Arena, January 2026
- Interactive map of AIS Arena
- Former names: Indoor Sports Stadium (planning/construction); National Indoor Sports Centre (1981–95)
- Address: 26 Leverrier Street, Bruce, Australian Capital Territory
- Coordinates: 35°14′52″S 149°6′4″E
- Owner: Australian Institute of Sport
- Capacity: 4,200 Concerts: Reserved: 3,502; General admission: 4,264; Theater: 2,718

Construction
- Groundbreaking: 1979
- Opened: 26 January 1981
- Renovated: 2016 & 2024
- Cost: $6.3 million
- Architect: Philip Cox & Partners
- Structural engineers: Bond James Laron & Murtagh
- Services engineer: SRG Limited
- General contractor: John Holland

Tenants
- Canberra Cannons (NBL) (1981–2003); Australian Institute of Sport (WNBL) (1981–2012); University of Canberra Capitals (WNBL) (1984–2020; 2024–present); AIS Canberra Darters (CBT) (2003–2007); Canberra Brave (AIHL) (2025); Sydney Kings (NBL) (2006-07, 2025); Sydney Spirit (NBL) (2008); Illawarra Hawks (NBL) (2019)

The AIS Arena is a multi-purpose arena in Canberra, Australia, located on the grounds of the Australian Institute of Sport that opened in 1981.

== History ==
The arena was designed by Philip Cox & Partners and the main contractor was John Holland. Architectural features include a 1,200 tonne suspended concrete panel roof supported by 12 steel masts and 36 mainstay cables. The roof has a span of 100.4 metres. The stadium is partly set into the ground to reduce its scale and to establish a visual connection between the landscape and the mast and cable structure of the roof.

The arena was opened by Prime Minister of Australia, Malcolm Fraser, on 26 January 1981 as the National Indoor Sports Centre.

The AIS Arena has served as the home court for the Canberra Cannons of the National Basketball League (NBL), the Canberra Capitals of the Women's National Basketball League (WNBL) and, at times, the Australian Institute of Sport WNBL team. While the Cannons were playing at the arena it was known as "The Palace". The arena has hosted Australian Boomers and Australian Opals international basketball games, as well as the Australian Netball Diamonds. The arena has also hosted the Canberra Roller Derby League and many concerts.

When it was first constructed, the venue had a seating capacity of 4,000. A major refurbishment in 1992 increased the capacity to 4,500. In 1995 the stadium underwent a further redevelopment that expanded capacity to 5,200, introduced a new main entrance, upgraded catering and corporate entertainment facilities, and added a café and the AIS Shop. During this redevelopment the venue was officially renamed the "AIS Arena".

In 2014, the AIS invested in a $200,000 removable floor to help it tap into new markets to increase revenue by attracting more sports, concerts, ice skating and even indoor equestrian events at AIS Arena.

In 2015 and 2016, the venue received a $9.4 million upgrade, with the refurbishment involving better seating and windows. It forced the Canberra Capitals to find an alternative home venue for the end of the 2015–16 WNBL season.

The arena was shut down in 2020 due to the COVID-19 pandemic and its poor fire safety. It was later used as a mass vaccination clinic. The arena received $15 million worth of repair work and re-opened in 2024.

For the 2024–25 WNBL season, the Capitals returned to the AIS Arena for the first time since the 2019–20 season. The Canberra Brave of the Australian Ice Hockey League made their temporary move to the arena for eleven games during the 2025 season before completion of their new arena. An ice surface was laid atop the existing floor at AIS Arena.

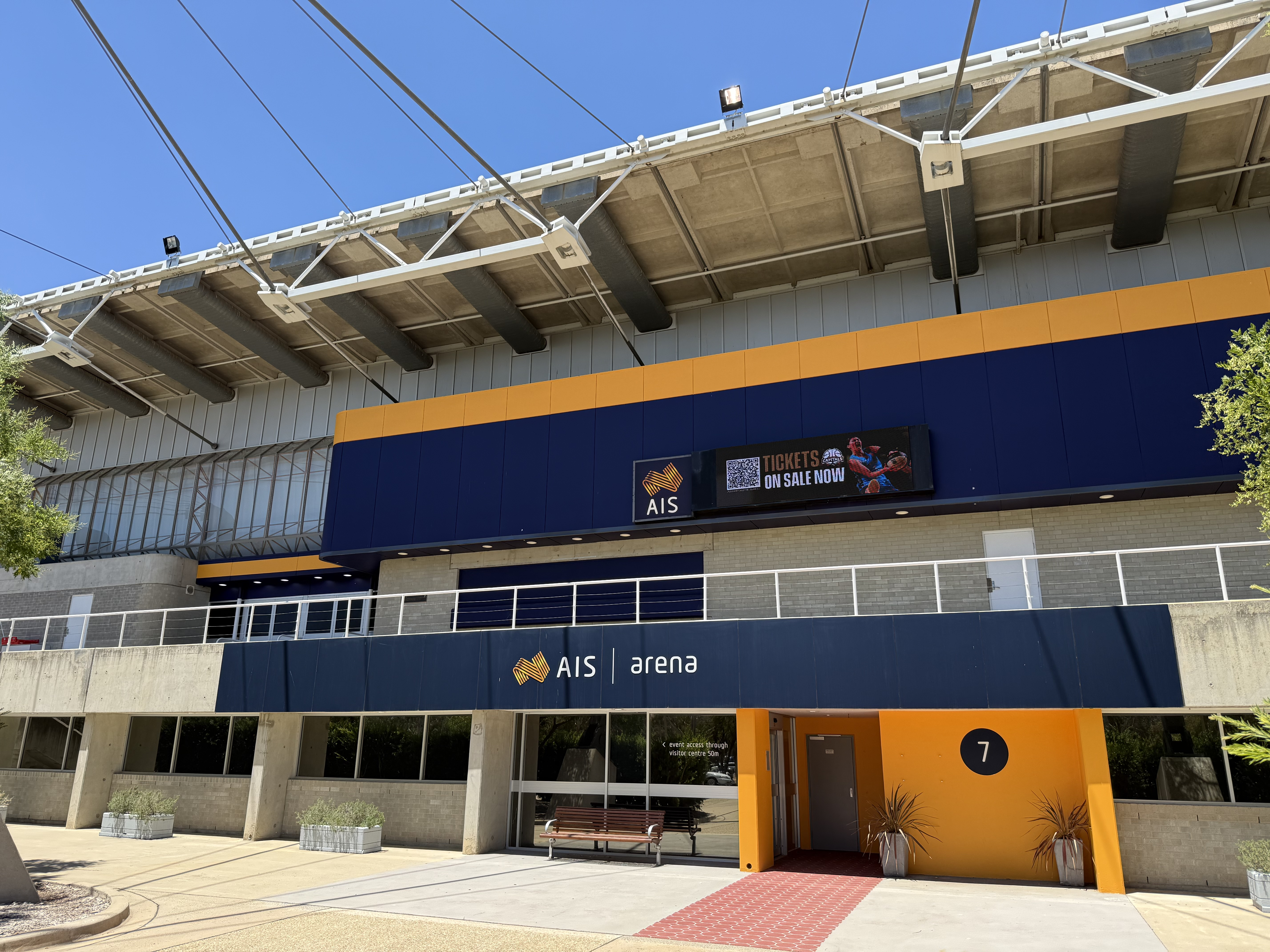
AIS Arena exterior

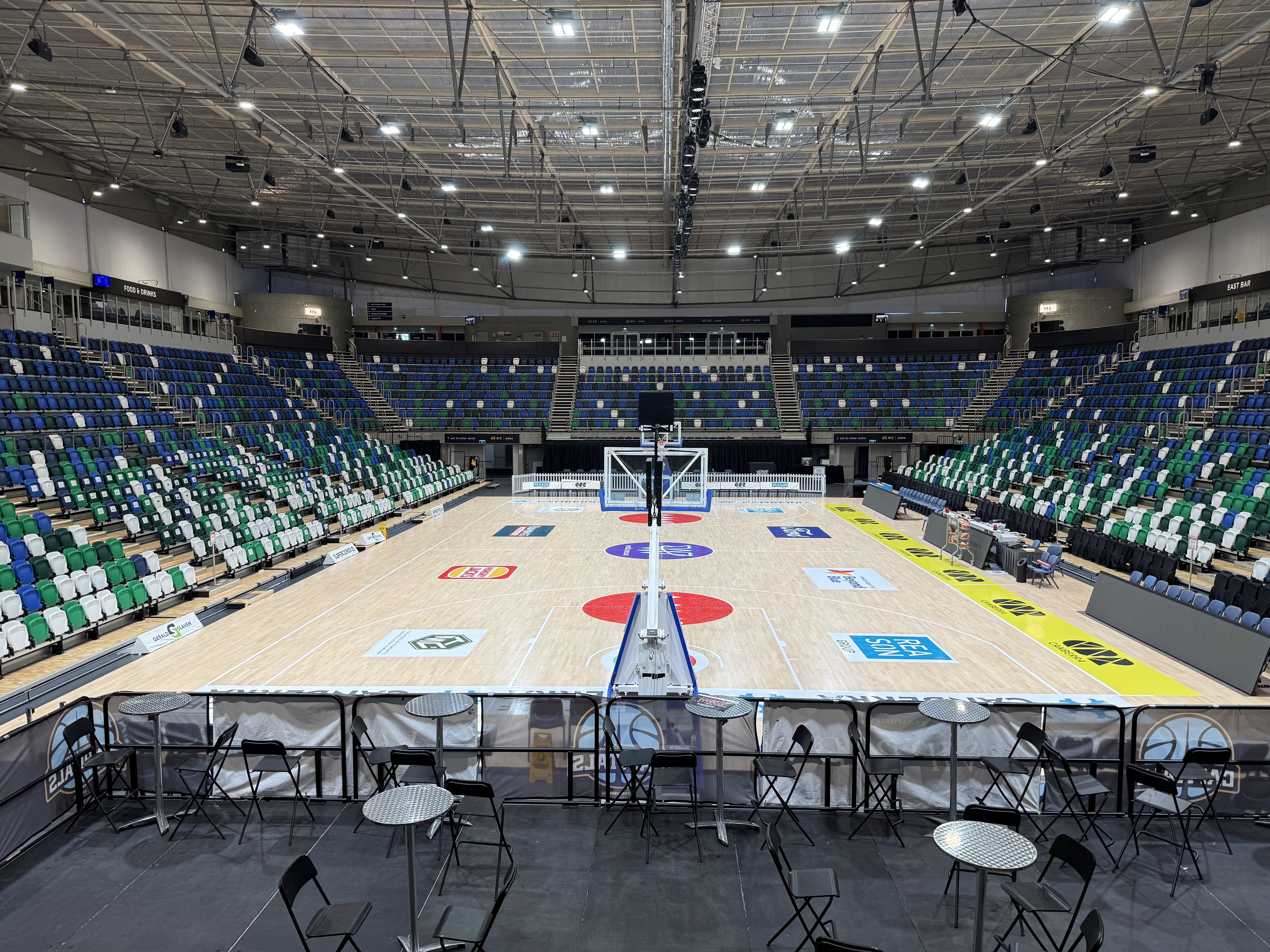
AIS Arena interior
