= 2016 in UFC =

Mixed martial arts events

Information
- First date: January 2
- Last date: December 30

Events
- Total events: 41 (1 cancelled)
- UFC: 13
- UFC on Fox: 5
- UFC Fight Night: 21 (1 cancelled)
- TUF Finale events: 2

Fights
- Total fights: 493
- Title fights: 22

Chronology
2015 in UFC	2016 in UFC	2017 in UFC

The year 2016 was the 24th year in the history of the Ultimate Fighting Championship, a mixed martial arts promotion based in the United States.

== 2016 UFC.com awards ==
2016 UFC.COM Awards
No	Best Fighter	The Upsets	The Submissions	The Newcomers	The Knockouts	The Fights
1	Michael Bisping	Michael Bisping defeats Luke Rockhold 2 UFC 199	Ben Rothwell defeats Josh Barnett; UFC on Fox: Johnson vs. Bader	Mickey Gall	Lando Vannata defeats John Makdessi; UFC 206	Cub Swanson defeats Choi Doo-ho; UFC 206
2	Stipe Miocic	Eric Spicely defeats Thiago Santos; UFC Fight Night: Cyborg vs. Länsberg	Miesha Tate defeats Holly Holm; UFC 196	Cris Cyborg	Anthony Johnson defeats Glover Teixeira; UFC 202	Conor McGregor defeats Nate Diaz 2 UFC 202
3	Conor McGregor	Miesha Tate defeats Holly Holm; UFC 196	Brian Ortega defeats Diego Brandão; UFC 195	Lando Vannata	Diego Rivas defeats Noad Lahat; UFC Fight Night: Hendricks vs. Thompson	Robbie Lawler defeats Carlos Condit; UFC 195
4	Dominick Cruz	Brandon Moreno defeats Louis Smolka; UFC Fight Night: Lineker vs. Dodson	Chas Skelly defeats Maximo Blanco; UFC Fight Night: Poirier vs. Johnson	Marlon Moraes	Yair Rodríguez defeats Andre Fili; UFC 197	Steve Bossé defeats Sean O'Connell; UFC Fight Night: MacDonald vs. Thompson
5	Joanna Jędrzejczyk	Nate Diaz defeats Conor McGregor 1 UFC 196	Teemu Packalén defeats Thibault Gouti; UFC Fight Night: Silva vs. Bisping	Brandon Moreno	Stipe Miocic defeats Fabrício Werdum; UFC 198	Tyron Woodley defeats Stephen Thompson 1 UFC 205
6	Tyron Woodley	Bryan Barberena defeats Warlley Alves; UFC 198	Keita Nakamura defeats Kyle Noke; UFC Fight Night: McDonald vs. Lineker	Marc Diakiese	Donald Cerrone defeats Matt Brown; UFC 206	Joanna Jędrzejczyk defeats Cláudia Gadelha 2 The Ultimate Fighter 23 Finale
7	Stephen Thompson	Bryan Barberena defeats Sage Northcutt; UFC on Fox: Johnson vs. Bader	Demian Maia defeats Matt Brown; UFC 198	Justin Ledet	Michael Bisping defeats Luke Rockhold; UFC 199	Polo Reyes defeats Dong Hyun Ma; UFC 199
8	Gegard Mousasi	Bryan Caraway defeats Aljamain Sterling; UFC Fight Night: Almeida vs. Garbrandt	Michael McDonald defeats Masanori Kanehara; UFC 195	Josh Emmett	Tyron Woodley defeats Robbie Lawler; UFC 201	Donald Cerrone defeats Matt Brown; UFC 206
9	Donald Cerrone	Andrew Holbrook defeats Jake Matthews; UFC Fight Night: Whittaker vs. Brunson	Eric Spicely defeats Thiago Santos; UFC Fight Night: Cyborg vs. Länsberg	Andrew Sanchez	Dan Henderson defeats Héctor Lombard; UFC 199	Tony Ferguson defeats Rafael dos Anjos; The Ultimate Fighter: Heavy Hitters Finale
10	Derrick Lewis	Valentina Shevchenko defeats Holly Holm; UFC on Fox: Holm vs. Shevchenko	Francis Ngannou defeats Anthony Hamilton; UFC Fight Night: Lewis vs. Abdurakhimov	Mike Perry	Yoel Romero defeats Chris Weidman; UFC 205	Robert Whittaker defeats Derek Brunson; UFC Fight Night: Whittaker vs. Brunson
Ref						

== 2016 by the numbers ==
The numbers below records the events, fights, techniques, champions and fighters held or performed for the year of 2016 in UFC.

Events
Number of Events	PPV	Continents	Countries	Cities	Fight Night Bonuses
41	13	4	10	31	164; Total $8,200,000
Longest Event	Shortest Event	Highest Income Live Gate	Lowest Income Live Gate	Highest Attendance	Lowest Attendance
UFC Fight Night: MacDonald vs. Thompson 2:58:00	UFC 203 1:28:10	UFC 205 $17,700,000	The Ultimate Fighter 24 Finale $188,602	UFC 198 45,207	The Ultimate Fighter 24 Finale 2,044
Title Fights
Undisputed Title Fights	Title Changes	Champions Remained in Their Divisions	Number of Champions	Number of Interim Champions	Number of Title Defenses
19	4	3 FLW – Demetrious Johnson; LHW – Daniel Cormier; WSW – Joanna Jędrzejczyk	11	2	10
Champions
Division	Beginning of The Year	End of The Year	Division	Beginning of The Year	End of The Year
Heavyweight	Fabrício Werdum	Stipe Miocic	Bantamweight	T.J. Dillashaw	Cody Garbrandt
Light Heavyweight	Daniel Cormier	Daniel Cormier	Flyweight	Demetrious Johnson	Demetrious Johnson
Middleweight	Luke Rockhold	Michael Bisping	Women's Bantamweight	Holly Holm	Amanda Nunes
Welterweight	Robbie Lawler	Tyron Woodley	Women's Strawweight	Joanna Jędrzejczyk	Joanna Jędrzejczyk
Lightweight	Rafael dos Anjos	Conor McGregor			
Featherweight	Conor McGregor	José Aldo			
Fights
Most Knockouts at A Single Event	Most submissions at A Single Event	Most Decisions at A Single Event	Total Number of Fights	Total Number of Cage Time	
UFC 199 8	UFC Fight Night: dos Anjos vs. Alvarez 6	UFC Fight Night: Whittaker vs. Brunson; UFC Fight Night: Silva vs. Bisping 10	493	91:31:14	
Fighters
Number of Fighters	UFC Debutants	Releases / Retired	Fighters Suspended	Number of Fighters Missed weight	
(At the end of Dec 31, 2016); 550	116	N/A	N/A	22	
Champion feats
Michael Bisping became the first British champion.; Eddie Alvarez became the first fighter to win a UFC and Bellator championship.; Conor McGregor became the first simultaneous two-division champion holding both the featherweight and lightweight titles.
Fighter feats
Noad Lahat became the first fighter in UFC/WEC/Strikeforce/PRIDE combined history to lose via a flying knee on two separate occasions.; At UFC Fight Night 85, Neil Magny set a new record with 100 significant ground strikes, a mark later surpassed by Punahele Soriano in June 2024.; At UFC Fight Night 86, Junior dos Santos set a single‑fight record with 92 significant body strikes, a mark later surpassed by Max Holloway in January 2021.; At age 45, Dan Henderson became the oldest fighter in UFC history to earn a knockout victory.; At UFC Fight Night 94, Chas Skelly recorded a 19‑second submission, setting a new mark for the fastest submission in UFC/WEC featherweight history.; By missing weight for the fifth time, John Lineker set the record for the most weight‑misses in UFC history.; Conor McGregor became the first fighter in UFC history to earn Post‑Fight bonuses in eight consecutive bouts.

== Debut UFC fighters ==
The following fighters fought their first UFC fight in 2016:

ISO	Fighter	Division
(Ghana)	Abdul Razak Alhassan	Welterweight
(United States)	Adam Milstead	Heavyweight
(United States)	Albert Morales	Bantamweight
(Brazil)	Alberto Uda	Middleweight
(Canada)	Alessandro Ricci	Lightweight
(Italy)	Alessio Di Chirico	Middleweight
(United States)	Alex Morono	Welterweight
(United States)	Alex Nicholson	Middleweight
(Australia)	Alexander Volkanovski	Lightweight
(Mexico)	Alexa Grasso	Women's Strawweight
(United States)	Amanda Cooper	Women's Strawweight
(United States)	Andrew Sanchez	Middleweight
(Denmark)	Anna Elmose	Women's Strawweight
(United States)	Ashley Yoder	Women's Strawweight
(Brazil)	Augusto Mendes	Bantamweight
(United States)	Belal Muhammad	Welterweight
(Serbia)	Bojan Veličković	Welterweight
(Mexico)	Brandon Moreno	Flyweight
(Wales)	Brett Johns	Bantamweight
(United States)	Brian Camozzi	Welterweight
(Brazil)	Cris Cyborg	Women's Featherweight
(United States)	CM Punk	Welterweight
(Republic of Ireland)	Charlie Ward	Middleweight
(United States)	Chase Sherman	Heavyweight
(United States)	Chris Avila	Featherweight
(Denmark)	Christian Colombo	Heavyweight
(Peru)	Claudio Puelles	Lightweight
(United States)	Cody East	Heavyweight
(United States)	Cory Hendricks	Light Heavyweight
(Romania)	Cristina Stanciu	Women's Strawweight
(United States)	Curtis Blaydes	Heavyweight
(France)	Cyril Asker	Heavyweight
(Poland)	Damian Grabowski	Heavyweight
(Bosnia and Herzegovina)	Damir Hadžović	Lightweight
(United States)	Danielle Taylor	Women's Strawweight
(United States)	Darrell Horcher	Lightweight

ISO	Fighter	Division
(England)	Darren Stewart	Light Heavyweight
(Sweden)	David Teymur	Lightweight
(Australia)	Damien Brown	Lightweight
(United States)	Devin Clark	Light Heavyweight
(Russia)	Dmitry Smolyakov	Heavyweight
(Bosnia and Herzegovina)	Elvis Mutapčić	Middleweight
(Norway)	Emil Weber Meek	Welterweight
(United States)	Eric Spicely	Middleweight
(Croatia)	Filip Pejić	Bantamweight
(Brazil)	Felipe Olivieri	Lightweight
(Brazil)	Felipe Silva	Lightweight
(Russia)	Gadzhimurad Antigulov	Light Heavyweight
(United States)	Gerald Meerschaert	Middleweight
(United States)	Gregor Gillespie	Lightweight
(United States)	Hector Sandoval	Flyweight
(Brazil)	Henrique da Silva	Light Heavyweight
(Moldova)	Ion Cuțelaba	Light Heavyweight
(Mexico)	Irene Aldana	Women's Bantamweight
(United States)	J.C. Cottrell	Lightweight
(Sweden)	Jack Hermansson	Middleweight
(Syria)	Jarjis Danho	Heavyweight
(United States)	Jason Gonzalez	Lightweight
(United States)	Jason Novelli	Lightweight
(Philippines)	Jenel Lausa	Flyweight
(Canada)	Jeremy Kennedy	Featherweight
(Germany)	Jessin Ayari	Welterweight
(England)	Jim Wallhead	Welterweight
(United States)	Joe Gigliotti	Middleweight
(United States)	Joey Gomez	Bantamweight
(Denmark)	Joachim Christensen	Light Heavyweight
(Canada)	Jonathan Meunier	Welterweight
(United States)	Jordan Rinaldi	Lightweight
(United States)	Josh Emmett	Lightweight
(United States)	Josh Stansbury	Light Heavyweight
(United States)	Justin Ledet	Heavyweight
(United States)	Katlyn Chookagian	Women's Bantamweight

ISO	Fighter	Division
(United States)	Kelly Faszholz	Women's Bantamweight
(Brazil)	Ketlen Vieira	Women's Bantamweight
(United States)	Khalil Rountree Jr.	Light Heavyweight
(United States)	Kyle Bochniak	Featherweight
(United States)	Lando Vannata	Lightweight
(Brazil)	Leonardo Guimarães	Middleweight
(Sweden)	Lina Länsberg	Women's Bantamweight
(Brazil)	Luan Chagas	Welterweight
(United States)	Luke Sanders	Bantamweight
(England)	Marc Diakiese	Lightweight
(England)	Mark Godbeer	Heavyweight
(Poland)	Marcin Tybura	Heavyweight
(Mexico)	Martin Bravo	Featherweight
(Sweden)	Martin Svensson	Featherweight
(Italy)	Marvin Vettori	Middleweight
(United States)	Matt Schnell	Flyweight
(United States)	Matthew Lopez	Bantamweight
(United States)	Max Griffin	Welterweight
(France)	Mehdi Baghdad	Lightweight
(United States)	Mickey Gall	Welterweight
(United States)	Michael McBride	Lightweight
(United States)	Mike Jackson	Welterweight
(United States)	Mike Perry	Welterweight
(United States)	Niko Price	Welterweight
(Scotland)	Paul Craig	Light Heavyweight
(Jamaica)	Randy Brown	Welterweight
(United States)	Ricky Glenn	Featherweight
(Canada)	Ryan Janes	Middleweight
(United States)	Sabah Homasi	Welterweight
(Russia)	Saparbek Safarov	Light Heavyweight
(United States)	Shane Burgos	Featherweight
(United States)	Tatiana Suarez	Women's Strawweight
(France)	Thibault Gouti	Lightweight
(Australia)	Tyson Pedro	Light Heavyweight
(Venezuela)	Veronica Macedo	Women's Bantamweight
(Brazil)	Viviane Pereira	Women's Strawweight
(United States)	Will Brooks	Lightweight
(United States)	Zak Ottow	Welterweight

== The Ultimate Fighter ==
Season	Finale	Division	Winner	Runner-up
TUF 23: Team Joanna vs. Team Cláudia	July 8, 2016	Light Heavyweight	Andrew Sanchez	Khalil Rountree Jr.
TUF 23: Team Joanna vs. Team Cláudia	July 8, 2016	Women's Strawweight	Tatiana Suarez	Amanda Cooper
TUF: Latin America 3	November 5, 2016	Lightweight	Martín Bravo	Claudio Puelles
TUF 24: Tournament of Champions	December 3, 2016	Flyweight	Tim Elliott	Hiromasa Ogikubo

== Title fights ==
Title fights in 2016
Weight class				Method	Round	Time	Event	Notes
Welterweight	Robbie Lawler (c)	def.	Carlos Condit	Decision (split) (47-48, 48-47, 48-47)	5	5:00	UFC 195	(Note: For the UFC Welterweight Championship.)
Bantamweight	Dominick Cruz	def.	T.J. Dillashaw (c)	Decision (split) (48-47, 46-49, 49-46)	5	5:00	UFC Fight Night 81	(Note: For the UFC Bantamweight Championship.)
Women's Bantamweight	Miesha Tate	def	Holly Holm (c)	Submission (rear-naked choke)	5	3:30	UFC 196	(Note: For the UFC Women's Bantamweight Championship.)
Flyweight	Demetrious Johnson (c)	def	Henry Cejudo	TKO (knees and punches)	1	2:49	UFC 197	(Note: For the UFC Flyweight Championship.)
Light Heavyweight	Jon Jones	def	Ovince Saint Preux	Decision (unanimous) (50-44, 50-45, 50-45)	5	5:00	UFC 197	(Note: For the interim UFC Light Heavyweight Championship.)
Heavyweight	Stipe Miocic	def.	Fabrício Werdum (c)	KO (punch)	1	2:47	UFC 198	(Note: For the UFC Heavyweight Championship.)
Bantamweight	Dominick Cruz (c)	def.	Urijah Faber	Decision (unanimous) (50-45, 50-45, 49-46)	5	5:00	UFC 199	(Note: For the UFC Bantamweight Championship.)
Middleweight	Michael Bisping	def.	Luke Rockhold (c)	KO (punches)	1	3:36	UFC 199	(Note: For the UFC Middleweight Championship.)
Lightweight	Eddie Alvarez	def.	Rafael dos Anjos (c)	TKO (punches)	1	3:49	UFC Fight Night 90	(Note: For the UFC Lightweight Championship.)
Women's Strawweight	Joanna Jędrzejczyk (c)	def.	Cláudia Gadelha	Decision (unanimous) (48-46, 48-45, 48-46)	5	5:00	The Ultimate Fighter 23 Finale	(Note: For the UFC Women's Strawweight Championship.)
Featherweight	José Aldo	def.	Frankie Edgar	Decision (unanimous) (49-46, 49-46, 48-47)	5	5:00	UFC 200	(Note: For the interim UFC Featherweight Championship.)
Women's Bantamweight	Amanda Nunes	def.	Miesha Tate (c)	Submission (rear-naked choke)	1	3:16	UFC 200	(Note: For the UFC Women's Bantamweight Championship.)
Welterweight	Tyron Woodley	def.	Robbie Lawler (c)	KO (punches)	1	2:12	UFC 201	(Note: For the UFC Welterweight Championship.)
Heavyweight	Stipe Miocic (c)	def.	Alistair Overeem	KO (punches)	1	4:27	UFC 203	(Note: For the UFC Heavyweight Championship.)
Middleweight	Michael Bisping (c)	def.	Dan Henderson	Decision (unanimous) (48-47, 48-47, 49-46)	5	5:00	UFC 204	(Note: For the UFC Middleweight Championship.)
Women's Strawweight	Joanna Jędrzejczyk (c)	def.	Karolina Kowalkiewicz	Decision (unanimous) (49-46, 49-46, 49-46)	5	5:00	UFC 205	(Note: For the UFC Women's Strawweight Championship.)
Welterweight	Tyron Woodley (c)	vs.	Stephen Thompson	Draw (majority) (48-47, 47-47, 47-47)	5	5:00	UFC 205	(Note: For the UFC Welterweight Championship.)
Lightweight	Conor McGregor	def.	Eddie Alvarez (c)	TKO (punches)	2	3:04	UFC 205	(Note: For the UFC Lightweight Championship.)
Flyweight	Demetrious Johnson (c)	def.	Tim Elliott	Decision (unanimous) (49-46, 49-46, 49-45)	5	5:00	The Ultimate Fighter 24 Finale	(Note: For the UFC Flyweight Championship.)
Featherweight	Max Holloway	def.	Anthony Pettis	TKO (body kick and punches)	3	4:50	UFC 206	(Note: For the interim UFC Featherweight Championship (only Holloway was eligible).)
Bantamweight	Cody Garbrandt	def.	Dominick Cruz (c)	Decision (unanimous) (48-46, 48-47, 48-46)	5	5:00	UFC 207	(Note: For the UFC Bantamweight Championship.)
Women's Bantamweight	Amanda Nunes (c)	def.	Ronda Rousey	TKO (punches)	1	0:48	UFC 207	(Note: For the UFC Women's Bantamweight Championship.)

== Events list ==
#	Event	Date	Venue	Location	Attendance
385	UFC 207: Nunes vs. Rousey	December 30, 2016	T-Mobile Arena	Las Vegas, Nevada, U.S.	18,533
384	UFC on Fox: VanZant vs. Waterson	December 17, 2016	Golden 1 Center	Sacramento, California, U.S.	13,136
383	UFC 206: Holloway vs. Pettis	December 10, 2016	Air Canada Centre	Toronto, Ontario, Canada	18,057
382	UFC Fight Night: Lewis vs. Abdurakhimov	December 9, 2016	Times Union Center	Albany, New York, U.S	6,216
381	The Ultimate Fighter: Tournament of Champions Finale	December 3, 2016	Palms Casino Resort	Las Vegas, Nevada, U.S.	2,044
380	UFC Fight Night: Whittaker vs. Brunson	November 27, 2016	Rod Laver Arena	Melbourne, Victoria, Australia	13,721
379	UFC Fight Night: Bader vs. Nogueira 2	November 19, 2016	Ginásio do Ibirapuera	São Paulo, Brazil	9,028
378	UFC Fight Night: Mousasi vs. Hall 2	November 19, 2016	SSE Arena	Belfast, Northern Ireland, U.K.	7,222
377	UFC 205: Alvarez vs. McGregor	November 12, 2016	Madison Square Garden	New York, New York, U.S.	20,427
376	The Ultimate Fighter Latin America 3 Finale: dos Anjos vs. Ferguson	November 5, 2016	Arena Ciudad de México	Mexico City, Mexico	11,460
–	UFC Fight Night: Lamas vs. Penn	October 15, 2016	Mall of Asia Arena	Pasay, Philippines	Cancelled
375	UFC 204: Bisping vs. Henderson 2	October 8, 2016	Manchester Arena	Manchester, England, U.K.	16,000
374	UFC Fight Night: Lineker vs. Dodson	October 1, 2016	Moda Center	Portland, Oregon, U.S.	6,240
373	UFC Fight Night: Cyborg vs. Lansberg	September 24, 2016	Ginásio Nilson Nelson	Brasília, Brazil	8,410
372	UFC Fight Night: Poirier vs. Johnson	September 17, 2016	State Farm Arena	Hidalgo, Texas, U.S.	5,624
371	UFC 203: Miocic vs. Overeem	September 10, 2016	Quicken Loans Arena	Cleveland, Ohio, U.S.	18,875
370	UFC Fight Night: Arlovski vs. Barnett	September 3, 2016	Barclaycard Arena	Hamburg, Germany	11,763
369	UFC on Fox: Maia vs. Condit	August 27, 2016	Rogers Arena	Vancouver, British Columbia, Canada	10,533
368	UFC 202: Diaz vs. McGregor 2	August 20, 2016	T-Mobile Arena	Las Vegas, Nevada, U.S.	15,539
367	UFC Fight Night: Rodríguez vs. Caceres	August 6, 2016	Vivint Smart Home Arena	Salt Lake City, Utah, U.S.	6,689
366	UFC 201: Lawler vs. Woodley	July 30, 2016	Philips Arena	Atlanta, Georgia, U.S.	10,240
365	UFC on Fox: Holm vs. Shevchenko	July 23, 2016	United Center	Chicago, Illinois, U.S.	10,287
364	UFC Fight Night: McDonald vs. Lineker	July 13, 2016	Denny Sanford Premier Center	Sioux Falls, South Dakota, U.S.	5,671
363	UFC 200: Tate vs. Nunes	Jul 9, 2016	T-Mobile Arena	Las Vegas, Nevada, U.S.	18,202
362	The Ultimate Fighter: Team Joanna vs. Team Cláudia Finale	Jul 8, 2016	MGM Grand Garden Arena	Las Vegas, Nevada, U.S.	8,115
361	UFC Fight Night: dos Anjos vs. Alvarez	Jul 7, 2016	MGM Grand Garden Arena	Las Vegas, Nevada, U.S.	7,760
360	UFC Fight Night: MacDonald vs. Thompson	June 18, 2016	TD Place Arena	Ottawa, Ontario, Canada	10,490
359	UFC 199: Rockhold vs Bisping 2	June 4, 2016	The Forum	Inglewood, California, U.S	15,587
358	UFC Fight Night: Almeida vs. Garbrandt	May 29, 2016	Mandalay Bay Events Center	Las Vegas, Nevada, U.S.	5,193
357	UFC 198: Werdum vs. Miocic	May 14, 2016	Arena da Baixada	Curitiba, Brazil	45,207
356	UFC Fight Night: Overeem vs. Arlovski	May 8, 2016	Rotterdam Ahoy	Rotterdam, Netherlands	10,421
355	UFC 197: Jones vs. Saint Preux	April 23, 2016	MGM Grand Garden Arena	Las Vegas, Nevada, U.S	11,352
354	UFC on Fox: Teixeira vs. Evans	April 16, 2016	Amalie Arena	Tampa, Florida, U.S.	11,273
353	UFC Fight Night: Rothwell vs. dos Santos	April 10, 2016	Arena Zagreb	Zagreb, Croatia	13,177
352	UFC Fight Night: Hunt vs. Mir	March 20, 2016	Brisbane Entertainment Centre	Brisbane, Queensland, Australia	9,552
351	UFC 196: McGregor vs. Diaz	March 5, 2016	MGM Grand Garden Arena	Las Vegas, Nevada, U.S.	14,898
350	UFC Fight Night: Silva vs. Bisping	Feb 27, 2016	The O_{2} Arena	London, England, U.K.	16,734
349	UFC Fight Night: Cowboy vs. Cowboy	Feb 21, 2016	Consol Energy Center	Pittsburgh, Pennsylvania, U.S.	7,330
348	UFC Fight Night: Hendricks vs. Thompson	Feb 6, 2016	MGM Grand Garden Arena	Las Vegas, Nevada, U.S.	7,422
347	UFC on Fox: Johnson vs. Bader	Jan 30, 2016	Prudential Center	Newark, New Jersey, U.S.	10,555
346	UFC Fight Night: Dillashaw vs. Cruz	Jan 17, 2016	TD Garden	Boston, Massachusetts, U.S.	12,022
345	UFC 195: Lawler vs. Condit	Jan 2, 2016	MGM Grand Garden Arena	Las Vegas, Nevada, U.S.	10,300

== See also ==
- List of UFC champions
- List of UFC events
