= UFC Fight Night: Lamas vs. Penn =

UFC cancelled mixed martial arts event in 2016

- The poster for UFC Fight Night: Lamas vs. Penn
- Promotion: Ultimate Fighting Championship
- Date: October 15, 2016 (cancelled)
- Venue: Mall of Asia Arena
- City: Pasay, Philippines

Event chronology
| UFC 204: Bisping vs Henderson 2 | UFC Fight Night: Lamas vs. Penn | The Ultimate Fighter Latin America 3 Finale: dos Anjos vs. Ferguson |

UFC Fight Night: Lamas vs. Penn (also known as UFC Fight Night 97) was a planned mixed martial arts event that was set to be held by the Ultimate Fighting Championship on October 15, 2016, at the Mall of Asia Arena in Pasay, Philippines.

== Background ==
The event in Pasay was supposed to be the second that the organization hosted in the Philippines, with the first being UFC Fight Night: Edgar vs. Faber on May 16, 2015. The entire event was supposed to stream live on UFC Fight Pass.

A featherweight bout between former title challenger Ricardo Lamas and former UFC Lightweight and Welterweight Champion B.J. Penn was expected to serve as the main event. However, on October 4, Penn pulled out of the fight citing an injury. In turn, the promotion announced on October 6 that they had cancelled the event entirely.

The remaining fighters on the card were all awarded their contracted show money despite not competing. All of the fighters on the card were rebooked for future events. This was the third time, following UFC 151 in September 2012, and UFC 176 in August 2014 that the promotion elected to cancel an event because of a lack of a high-profile fight to fill a main event spot.

A lightweight bout between Damir Hadžović and Yusuke Kasuya, initially scheduled for UFC 203, was postponed after Hadžović experienced an issue with his travel visa. The pairing was rescheduled and was expected to take place at this event.

Mehdi Baghdad was expected to face Jon Tuck at the event. However, Baghdad pulled out of the fight in mid-September citing injury and was replaced by promotional newcomer Alexander Volkanovski.

== Cancelled fight card ==
Main Card (UFC Fight Pass)
| Weight class | | | | Method | Round | Time | Notes |
|---|---|---|---|---|---|---|---|
| Featherweight | Ricardo Lamas | vs. | B.J. Penn | | | | (Note: Lamas booked against Charles Oliveira. Moved to The Ultimate Fighter Latin America 3 Finale: dos Anjos vs. Ferguson; Penn booked against Yair Rodríguez. Moved to UFC Fight Night: Rodríguez vs. Penn.) |
| Heavyweight | Derrick Lewis | vs. | Marcin Tybura | | | | (Note: Lewis booked against Shamil Abdurakhimov. Moved to UFC Fight Night: Lewis vs. Abdurakhimov) |
| Flyweight | Jenel Lausa | vs. | Yao Zhikui | | | | (Note: Moved to UFC Fight Night: Whittaker vs. Brunson) |
| Featherweight | Cole Miller | vs. | Mizuto Hirota | | | | (Note: Moved to UFC on Fox: VanZant vs. Waterson) |
Preliminary Card (UFC Fight Pass)
| Middleweight | Sam Alvey | vs. | Alex Nicholson | | | | (Note: Moved to The Ultimate Fighter Latin America 3 Finale: dos Anjos vs. Ferguson.) |
| Lightweight | Jon Tuck | vs. | Alexander Volkanovski | | | | (Note: Tuck booked against Damien Brown; Volkanovski booked against Kasuya. Both moved to UFC Fight Night: Whittaker vs. Brunson) |
| Middleweight | Yang Dongi | vs. | Ryan Janes | | | | (Note: Janes booked against Keith Berish. Moved to UFC Fight Night: Lewis vs. Abdurakhimov) |
| Women's Strawweight | Seo Hee Ham | vs. | Danielle Taylor | | | | (Note: Moved to UFC Fight Night: Whittaker vs. Brunson) |
| Welterweight | James Moontasri | vs. | Alex Morono | | | | (Note: Moved to UFC on Fox: VanZant vs. Waterson) |
| Flyweight | Kyoji Horiguchi | vs. | Ali Bagautinov | | | | (Note: Moved to UFC Fight Night: Mousasi vs. Hall 2) |
| Lightweight | Damir Hadžović | vs. | Yusuke Kasuya | | | | (Note: Kasuya booked against Volkanovski and moved to UFC Fight Night: Whittaker vs. Brunson) |

== See also ==
- List of UFC events
- 2016 in UFC
