= UFC 207 =

UFC mixed martial arts event in 2016

UFC 207: Nunes vs. Rousey
- The poster for UFC 207: Nunes vs. Rousey
- Promotion: Ultimate Fighting Championship
- Date: December 30, 2016
- Venue: T-Mobile Arena
- City: Paradise, Nevada
- Attendance: 18,533
- Total gate: $4,750,000
- Buyrate: 1,100,000

Event chronology
UFC on Fox: VanZant vs. Waterson	UFC 207: Nunes vs. Rousey	UFC Fight Night: Rodríguez vs. Penn

UFC 207: Nunes vs. Rousey was a mixed martial arts event produced by the Ultimate Fighting Championship (UFC) held on December 30, 2016, at the T-Mobile Arena in Paradise, Nevada, part of the Las Vegas metropolitan area.

== Background ==
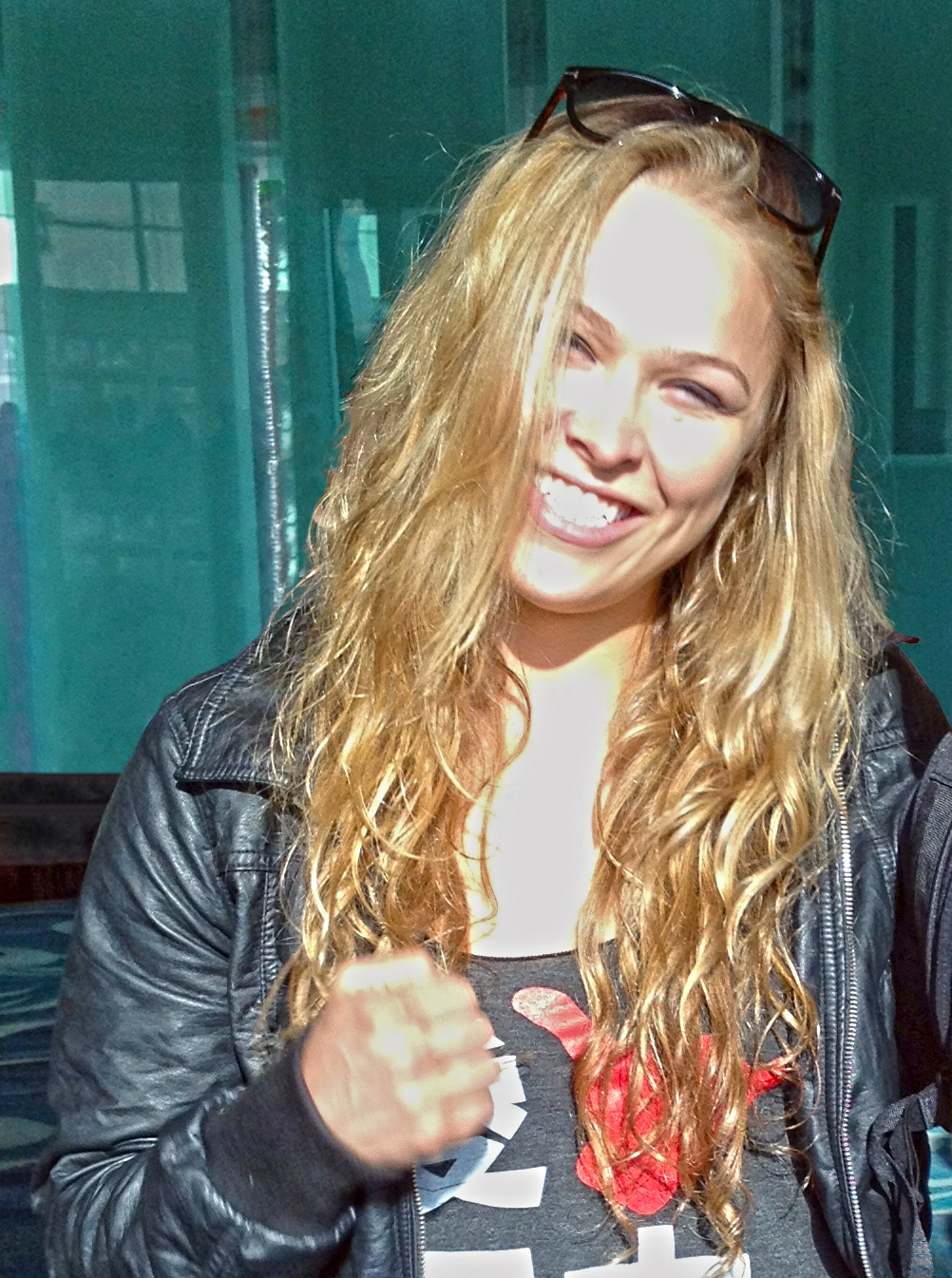
Rousey had her first fight since losing her title (and undefeated record) to Holly Holm at UFC 193 in November 2015.

The event was headlined by a UFC Women's Bantamweight Championship bout between current champion Amanda Nunes and former champion Ronda Rousey.

A UFC Bantamweight Championship bout between then champion Dominick Cruz and Cody Garbrandt co-headlined the event.

A potential heavyweight title eliminator bout between former UFC Heavyweight Champions Fabrício Werdum and Cain Velasquez was expected to take place on the card. The pairing met previously in June 2015 at UFC 188, with then interim champion Werdum unifying the title with Velasquez's undisputed title, as he won the fight via submission in the third round. However the Nevada State Athletic Commission, after analyzing physical examinations and interviews, deemed Velasquez unfit to compete due to prior injuries, and pulled him from the event on December 24. The bout was eventually scrapped, and Werdum was removed from the card as well.

Another potential title eliminator included a bantamweight bout between former champion T.J. Dillashaw and John Lineker.

Matt Brown was expected to face former Strikeforce Welterweight Champion Tarec Saffiedine at the event. However, Brown was pulled from the fight on November 11 in favor of a matchup with former UFC Lightweight Championship challenger Donald Cerrone three weeks earlier at UFC 206. Saffiedine instead faced Dong Hyun Kim.

Maryna Moroz was very briefly linked to a fight with Jéssica Andrade at the event. On December 7 Moroz was replaced by Invicta FC Strawweight Champion Angela Hill. Hill was then ruled out of fighting at UFC 207 because of a rule in the UFC's anti-doping policy with USADA, but not because she had failed a drug test. The pair eventually fought at UFC Fight Night 104, with Andrade winning by unanimous decision. Subsequently, Andrade was removed from the card and was rescheduled for that event.

Sabah Homasi was linked to a fight with Brandon Thatch at the event. However, Homasi pulled out due to injury and was replaced by promotional newcomer Niko Price.

This was the last event in which longtime play-by-play commentator Mike Goldberg participated. He made his debut in 1997 at UFC Japan: Ultimate Japan.

At the weigh-ins, former UFC Welterweight Champion Johny Hendricks and Ray Borg missed weight for their bouts, weighing in at 173.5 lb and 129.5 lb, respectively. As a result, they were fined 20% and 30% of their respective fight purses, which went to their respective opponents Neil Magny and Louis Smolka. Later, Hendricks would move up in weight to the 185 pound division, as a result of consistent weight misses.

== Results ==
Main Card
Weight class				Method	Round	Time	Notes
Women's Bantamweight	Amanda Nunes (c)	def.	Ronda Rousey	TKO (punches)	1	0:48	(Note: For the UFC Women's Bantamweight Championship.)
Bantamweight	Cody Garbrandt	def.	Dominick Cruz (c)	Decision (unanimous) (48–46, 48–47, 48–46)	5	5:00	(Note: For the UFC Bantamweight Championship.)
Bantamweight	T.J. Dillashaw	def.	John Lineker	Decision (unanimous) (30–26, 30–26, 30–26)	3	5:00
Welterweight	Dong Hyun Kim	def.	Tarec Saffiedine	Decision (split) (27–30, 29–28, 29–28)	3	5:00
Catchweight (129.5 lb)	Ray Borg	def.	Louis Smolka	Decision (unanimous) (30–27, 30–26, 30–26)	3	5:00
Preliminary Card (Fox Sports 1)
Catchweight (173.5 lb)	Neil Magny	def.	Johny Hendricks	Decision (unanimous) (29–28, 29–28, 29–28)	3	5:00
Middleweight	Antônio Carlos Júnior	def.	Marvin Vettori	Decision (unanimous) (29–28, 29–28, 29–28)	3	5:00
Welterweight	Alex Garcia	def.	Mike Pyle	KO (punch)	1	3:34
Welterweight	Niko Price	def.	Brandon Thatch	Submission (arm-triangle choke)	1	4:30
Preliminary Card (UFC Fight Pass)
Welterweight	Alex Oliveira	vs.	Tim Means	No Contest (illegal knees)	1	3:33	(Note: Means landed several knees to Oliveira's head, who was considered a downed opponent by the referee.)

== Bonus awards ==
The following fighters were awarded $50,000 bonuses:

- Fight of the Night: Dominick Cruz vs. Cody Garbrandt
- Performance of the Night: Amanda Nunes and Alex Garcia

== Reported payout ==
The following is the reported payout to the fighters as reported to the Nevada State Athletic Commission. It does not include sponsor money and also does not include the UFC's traditional "fight night" bonuses. The total disclosed payout for the event was $4,683,000.

- Amanda Nunes: $200,000 (includes $100,000 win bonus) def. Ronda Rousey: $3,000,000
- Cody Garbrandt: $200,000 (no win bonus) def. Dominick Cruz: $350,000
- T.J. Dillashaw: $200,000 (includes $100,000 win bonus) def. John Lineker: $43,000
- Dong Hyun Kim: $134,000 (includes $67,000 win bonus) def. Tarec Saffiedine: $40,000
- Ray Borg: $30,600 (includes $18,000 win bonus) def. Louis Smolka: $37,400 ¹
- Neil Magny: $114,000 (includes $47,000 win bonus) def. Johny Hendricks: $80,000 ²
- Antônio Carlos Júnior: $42,000 (includes $21,000 win bonus) def. Marvin Vettori: $12,000
- Alex Garcia: $36,000 (includes $18,000 win bonus) def. Mike Pyle: $55,000
- Niko Price: $24,000 (includes $12,000 win bonus) def. Brandon Thatch: $22,000
- Alex Oliveira: $28,000 vs. Tim Means: $35,000 ³

¹ Ray Borg was fined 30 percent of his purse ($5,400) for failing to make the required weight for his fight with Louis Smolka. That money was issued to Smolka, an NSAC official confirmed.
² Johny Hendricks was fined 20 percent of his purse ($20,000) for failing to make the required weight for his fight with Neil Magny. That money was issued to Magny, an NSAC official confirmed.
³ Both fighters earned show money; no win bonus since fight ended in a no-contest.

== Records set ==
The final attendance was 18,533, a record for Nevada, which had hosted 107 prior UFC events. Rousey's fight purse equaled the highest in history, which was Conor McGregor's record from UFC 202. Despite that, McGregor's UFC 205 purse is widely known as the highest one (no value is officially disclosed), even though the NYSAC does not release fight purses from events held in their jurisdiction.

== See also ==
- List of UFC events
- 2016 in UFC
