= Ning Guangyou =

Chinese mixed martial artist

- Born: 15 December 1981 (age 44); China
- Other names: Smasher
- Nationality: Chinese
- Height: 5 ft 5 in (1.65 m)
- Weight: 135 lb (61 kg; 9.6 st)
- Division: Featherweight (2007-2015); Bantamweight (2015-present)
- Reach: 64.0 in (163 cm)
- Fighting out of: Beijing, China
- Team: Tiger Muay Thai
- Years active: 2007-present

Mixed martial arts record
- Total: 10
- Wins: 5
- By knockout: 3
- By submission: 1
- By decision: 1
- Losses: 4
- By submission: 1
- By decision: 3
- Draws: 1

Other information
- Mixed martial arts record from Sherdog
- Last updated on: 5 April 2016

Ning Guangyou (simplified Chinese: 宁光友; traditional Chinese: 寧光友) (born December 15, 1981), is a Chinese mixed martial artist who competes in the bantamweight division. He won his contract through an 8-man tournament on The Ultimate Fighter: China.

== Mixed martial arts career ==
=== Early professional career ===
Ning made his professional mixed martial arts debut in 2007, competing primarily for regional promotions in China, with most of his fights taking place in Art of War Fighting Championship. In that time, Ning compiled a record of 3-2-1.

=== The Ultimate Fighter: China ===
In the fall of 2013, it was announced that Ning had been selected as one of the Featherweights participants for Team Sky Dragons on the inaugural season of The Ultimate Fighter: China.

Ning won his first fight on the show, defeating Shih Liang by knockout in the second round. Ning would then defeat Rocky Lee by knockout in the second round as well to advance to the finals.

=== Ultimate Fighting Championship ===
Ning was scheduled to make his official debut against fellow castmate Yang Jianping in the Featherweight finals on The Ultimate Fighter: China Finale. However, this bout had to be rescheduled after Yang got injured. The bout would eventually take place in Macau at UFC Fight Night: Bisping vs Le, in which Ning would beat Yang to win the Ultimate Fighter China Featherweight final.

Ning next faced Royston Wee in a Featherweight bout on May 16, 2015 at UFC Fight Night: Edgar vs Faber. Ning defeated Wee via a second round TKO.

After his win over Wee, Ning dropped down to Bantamweight for the first time in his career to fight Marco Beltrán at UFC Fight Night: Henderson vs Masvidal, in which Ning lost the fight via a split decision.

Guangyou was expected to face Marlon Vera on August 20, 2016 at UFC 202. Subsequently on August 9 it was revealed that Guangyou had tested positive for trace amounts of clenbuterol in relation to an out-of-competition drug test taken on May 19. Guangyou was cleared of wrongdoing after it was determined by USADA that he had possibly ingested tainted meat from China. As a result, he will not be punished in any way. The bout was rescheduled to take place a week later at UFC on Fox 21. In turn, the bout was postponed again due to alleged visa issues for Guangyou, which restricted the timing of his travel. The pairing eventually took place at featherweight on November 27, 2016 at UFC Fight Night 101. He lost the fight via unanimous decision.

In May 2017, Guangyou was released from the company.

== Mixed martial arts record ==
Professional record breakdown
10 matches	5 wins	4 losses
By knockout	3	0
By submission	1	1
By decision	1	3
Draws	1	

Res.	Record	Opponent	Method	Event	Date	Round	Time	Location	Notes
Loss	5–4–1	Marlon Vera	Decision (unanimous)	UFC Fight Night: Whittaker vs. Brunson	November 27, 2016	3	5:00	Melbourne, Australia	Featherweight bout.
Loss	5–3–1	Marco Beltrán	Decision (split)	UFC Fight Night: Henderson vs. Masvidal	November 28, 2015	3	5:00	Seoul, South Korea	
Win	5–2–1	Royston Wee	TKO (punches and elbows)	UFC Fight Night: Edgar vs. Faber	May 16, 2015	2	4:59	Manila, Philippines	Bantamweight debut; Wee missed weight (137 lbs).
Win	4–2–1	Jianping Yang	Decision (unanimous)	UFC Fight Night: Bisping vs. Le	August 23, 2014	3	5:00	Macau, SAR, China	Won The Ultimate Fighter: China Featherweight tournament.
Win	3–2–1	Zhouwen Jiang	TKO (punches)	RUFF 9	May 18, 2013	2	1:43	Sanya, China	
Loss	2–2–1	A Sol Kwon	Decision (unanimous)	Legend Fighting Championship 3	September 24, 2010	3	5:00	Hong Kong, SAR, China	
Loss	2–1–1	Kang Kyung-ho	Submission (triangle choke)	Art Of War Fighting Championship 13	July 18, 2009	1	7:34	Beijing, China	
Win	2–0–1	Sirojiddin Izakbaev	Submission (rear-naked choke)	Art of War Fighting Championship 12	May 23, 2009	1	4:51	Beijing, China	
Win	1–0–1	Kazuto Senga	TKO (punches)	Art of War Fighting Championship 11	March 22, 2009	1	2:13	Beijing, China	
Draw	0–0–1	Yuan Long	Draw	Art of War Fighting Championship 8	September 22, 2007	1	15:00	Beijing, China	

=== Mixed martial arts exhibition record ===
Exhibition record breakdown		
2 matches	2 wins	0 losses
By knockout	2	0
By submission	0	0
By decision	0	0

Res.	Record	Opponent	Method	Event	Date	Round	Time	Location	Notes
Win	2–0	Rocky Lee	KO (punches)	The Ultimate Fighter: China	2013	1	N/A	Beijing, China	Featherweight semifinals.
Win	1–0	Shih Liang	KO (punches)	The Ultimate Fighter: China	2013	2	N/A	Beijing, China	Featherweight quarterfinals.

== See also ==
- List of current UFC fighters
- List of male mixed martial artists
