= Tae Hyun Bang =

South Korean mixed martial arts fighter

- Born: April 15, 1983 (age 43); Seoul, South Korea
- Other names: The Supernatural; The Korean Cowboy
- Nationality: South Korean
- Height: 5 ft 9 in (1.75 m)
- Weight: 156 lb (71 kg; 11.1 st)
- Division: Welterweight; Lightweight
- Reach: 71 in (180 cm)
- Stance: Orthodox
- Fighting out of: Seoul, South Korea
- Team: Korean Top Team
- Years active: 2004-2016

Mixed martial arts record
- Total: 28
- Wins: 18
- By knockout: 9
- By decision: 9
- Losses: 10
- By submission: 3
- By decision: 7

Other information
- Mixed martial arts record from Sherdog

- Korean name
- Hangul: 방태현
- RR: Bang Taehyeon
- MR: Pang T'aehyŏn

Bang Tae-hyun (born April 15, 1983) is a South Korean former mixed martial artist who most recently competed in the Lightweight division of the Ultimate Fighting Championship. A professional competitor since 2004, he has also competed for World Victory Road and DEEP in Japan. He is the former DEEP Lightweight Champion.

== Mixed martial arts career ==
=== Ultimate Fighting Championship ===
Bang made his promotional debut against Mairbek Taisumov on January 4, 2014, at UFC Fight Night 34. He lost the fight via unanimous decision.

Bang faced Kajan Johnson on June 14, 2014, at UFC 174. Bang won the fight via knockout and won both Fight of the Night and Performance of the Night bonuses.

Bang next faced Jon Tuck on May 16, 2015, at UFC Fight Night 66. Bang lost the fight via submission in the first round.

Bang faced Leo Kuntz on November 28, 2015, at UFC Fight Night 79. He won the fight via split decision.

Bang next faced Nick Hein on September 3, 2016, at UFC Fight Night 93. He lost the fight via unanimous decision.

Bang was released from the UFC in October 2017.

== Fight fixing ==
On November 24, 2017, at the Seoul Central District Court in South Korea, Tae Hyun Bang was sentenced to 10 months in prison, along with the three "brokers" who set up the plot, for accepting bribes in connection to throw his fight against Leo Kuntz at UFC Fight Night 79 for US$92,160, where he bet half of the prize money on Kuntz. UFC officials warned both fighters of potential fight fixing when they noticed a big odd shift in the betting lines leading into the event.

== Championships and accomplishments ==
- DEEP
  - DEEP Lightweight Championship (One time)
- Ultimate Fighting Championship
  - Fight of the Night (One time)
  - Performance of the Night (One time)

== Mixed martial arts record ==
Professional record breakdown
28 matches	18 wins	10 losses
By knockout	9	0
By submission	0	3
By decision	9	7

Res.	Record	Opponent	Method	Event	Date	Round	Time	Location	Notes
Loss	18–10	Nick Hein	Decision (unanimous)	UFC Fight Night: Arlovski vs. Barnett	September 3, 2016	3	5:00	Hamburg, Germany	
Win	18–9	Leo Kuntz	Decision (split)	UFC Fight Night: Henderson vs. Masvidal	November 28, 2015	3	5:00	Seoul, South Korea	
Loss	17–9	Jon Tuck	Submission (rear-naked choke)	UFC Fight Night: Edgar vs. Faber	May 16, 2015	1	3:56	Pasay, Philippines	
Win	17–8	Kajan Johnson	KO (punch)	UFC 174	June 14, 2014	3	2:01	Vancouver, Canada	Performance of the Night. Fight of the Night.
Loss	16–8	Mairbek Taisumov	Decision (unanimous)	UFC Fight Night: Saffiedine vs. Lim	January 4, 2014	3	5:00	Marina Bay, Singapore	
Win	16–7	Joo Dong Hwang	TKO (punches)	Top FC: Original	June 29, 2013	2	0:00	Seoul, South Korea	
Loss	15–7	Daisuke Hanazawa	Submission (rear-naked choke)	Road FC 1: The Resurrection of Champions	October 23, 2010	1	2:54	Seoul, South Korea	
Win	15–6	Cameron Silva	TKO (punches)	M-1 Selection 2010: Asia Finals	July 3, 2010	1	3:02	Tokyo, Japan	
Loss	14–6	Jorge Masvidal	Decision (unanimous)	World Victory Road Presents: Sengoku 6	November 1, 2008	3	5:00	Saitama, Japan	
Loss	14–5	Takanori Gomi	Decision (unanimous)	World Victory Road Presents: Sengoku 4	August 24, 2008	3	5:00	Saitama, Japan	
Win	14–4	Kazunori Yokota	KO (punches)	DEEP 35: Impact	May 19, 2008	1	3:38	Tokyo, Japan	Won the DEEP Lightweight Championship.
Win	13–4	Luiz Andrade I	Decision (unanimous)	DEEP: clubDEEP Tokyo	March 29, 2008	2	5:00	Tokyo, Japan	
Win	12–4	Jutaro Nakao	TKO (punches)	DEEP 33: Impact	December 12, 2007	2	1:15	Tokyo, Japan	Catchweight (76 kg) bout.
Win	11–4	Yoshihiro Tomioka	Decision (unanimous)	DEEP 32: Impact	October 9, 2007	2	5:00	Tokyo, Japan	
Win	10–4	Naoki Matsushita	Decision (unanimous)	DEEP: CMA Festival 2	July 23, 2007	2	5:00	Tokyo, Japan	
Loss	9–4	Seichi Ikemoto	Decision (unanimous)	DEEP 30: Impact	July 8, 2007	3	5:00	Osaka, Japan	Welterweight bout.
Loss	9–3	Jong Man Kim	Decision (unanimous)	NF: Neo Fight 11	April 14, 2007	2	5:00	Seoul, South Korea	
Win	9–2	Malik Marai	Decision (unanimous)	NF: Neo Fight 11	April 14, 2007	2	5:00	Seoul, South Korea	
Win	8–2	Soon Myung Yoon	Decision (unanimous)	NF: Neo Fight 8	August 15, 2006	3	5:00	Busan, South Korea	
Win	7–2	Kyung Yang	KO (flying knee)	NF: Neo Fight 6, Day 2	October 3, 2005	2	0:34	North Chungcheong, South Korea	
Win	6–2	Jang Hoon Sung	Decision (unanimous)	NF: Neo Fight 6, Day 2	October 3, 2005	3	5:00	North Chungcheong, South Korea	Lightweight debut.
Win	5–2	Luis Charneski	TKO (punches)	G5: Gimme Five	January 15, 2005	1	2:32	Seoul, South Korea	
Loss	4–2	Jeong Ho Lee	Submission (armbar)	G5: Yungjin Pharm Middleweight Tournament Quarterfinals	December 6, 2004	1	1:42	Seoul, South Korea	
Win	4–1	Hae Won Kim	Decision (unanimous)	G5: Yungjin Pharm Middleweight Tournament Second Round	November 26, 2004	3	5:00	Seoul, South Korea	
Win	3–1	Sung Chu Kim	KO (punches)	G5: Yungjin Pharm Middleweight Tournament Opening Round	November 12, 2004	1	0:47	Seoul, South Korea	
Win	2–1	Kwang Sik Min	TKO (doctor stoppage)	G5: Gimme Five	October 16, 2004	2	1:25	Seoul, South Korea	
Loss	1–1	Myung Kyo Jung	Decision (unanimous)	G5: Motorola Middleweight Tournament Opening Round	August 20, 2004	3	5:00	Seoul, South Korea	
Win	1–0	Chang Min Oh	Decision (unanimous)	G5: Gimme Five	July 17, 2004	3	5:00	Seoul, South Korea	

== See also ==
- List of male mixed martial artists
