= UFC Fight Night: Henderson vs. Masvidal =

UFC mixed martial arts event in 2015

- The poster for UFC Fight Night: Henderson vs. Masvidal
- Promotion: Ultimate Fighting Championship
- Date: November 28, 2015
- Venue: Olympic Gymnastics Arena
- City: Seoul, South Korea
- Attendance: 12,156

Event chronology
The Ultimate Fighter Latin America 2 Finale: Magny vs. Gastelum	UFC Fight Night: Henderson vs. Masvidal	UFC Fight Night: Namajunas vs. VanZant

UFC Fight Night: Henderson vs. Masvidal (also known as UFC Fight Night 79) was a mixed martial arts event held on November 28, 2015, at Olympic Gymnastics Arena in Seoul, South Korea.

== Background ==
The event was the first that the organization hosted in South Korea.

A welterweight bout between former WEC and UFC Lightweight Champion Benson Henderson and former top contender Thiago Alves was expected to headline the event. However, on November 14, Alves pulled out the bout due to a broken rib and was replaced by Jorge Masvidal, who was originally scheduled to face Dong Hyun Kim. Kim in turn faced Dominic Waters.

A featherweight bout between Doo Ho Choi and Sam Sicilia was originally booked for UFC 173 and later UFC Fight Night: Mir vs. Duffee. However, Choi pulled out both times due to an injury and undisclosed reasons, respectively. The fight was later rescheduled for this event.

A heavyweight bout between the 2006 Pride Open-Weight Grand Prix champion and 2012 K-1 World Grand Prix champion Mirko Filipović and Anthony Hamilton was expected to serve as the co-main event. However, on November 10, Filipović abruptly announced his retirement, citing a shoulder injury as the main reason and also a series of recurring injuries and other effects of ageing. Subsequently, on the following day, UFC officials confirmed that Filipović had in fact failed a drug test. The U.S. Anti-Doping Agency (USADA) notified both Filipović and the UFC that he has been provisionally suspended due to a potential Anti-Doping Policy violation. Filipovic revealed he had taken HGH (Human Growth Hormone) to help recover from his injuries. Promotion officials also announced that Hamilton had been removed from the card and would be rescheduled for a new bout at a future event.

Hyun Gyu Lim was expected to face Dominique Steele at the event. However, Lim pulled out of the bout on November 20 and was replaced by promotional newcomer Dong Hyun Kim .

== Results ==
Main Card (UFC Fight Pass)
Weight class				Method	Round	Time	Notes
Welterweight	Benson Henderson	def.	Jorge Masvidal	Decision (split) (47–48, 48–47, 49–46)	5	5:00
Welterweight	Dong Hyun Kim	def.	Dominic Waters	TKO (punches)	1	3:11
Welterweight	Alberto Mina	def.	Yoshihiro Akiyama	Decision (split) (29–28, 28–29, 29–28)	3	5:00
Featherweight	Choi Doo-ho	def.	Sam Sicilia	TKO (punches)	1	1:33
Preliminary Card (UFC Fight Pass)
Middleweight	Yang Dongi	def.	Jake Collier	TKO (punches)	2	1:50
Featherweight	Mike De La Torre	def.	Yui Chul Nam	Decision (split) (29–28, 28–29, 29–28)	3	5:00
Lightweight	Tae Hyun Bang	def.	Leo Kuntz	Decision (split) (28–29, 29–28, 29–28)	3	5:00
Women's Strawweight	Seo Hee Ham	def.	Cortney Casey	Decision (unanimous) (29–28, 29–28, 29–28)	3	5:00
Flyweight	Fredy Serrano	def.	Yao Zhikui	TKO (arm injury)	1	0:44
Bantamweight	Marco Beltrán	def.	Ning Guangyou	Decision (split) (29–28, 28–29, 29–28)	3	5:00
Welterweight	Dominique Steele	def.	Dong Hyun Ma	KO (slam)	3	0:27

== Bonus awards ==
The following fighters were awarded $50,000 bonuses:

- Fight of the Night: Seo Hee Ham vs. Cortney Casey
- Performance of the Night: Doo Ho Choi and Dominique Steele

== Aftermath ==
On November 24, 2017 at the Seoul Central District Court in South Korea, Tae Hyun Bang was sentenced to a 10-month in prison, for accepting bribes in connection to throw his fight against Leo Kuntz for US$92,160, where he bet half of the bribe money on Kuntz. The three "brokers" who set up the plot were also sentenced. UFC officials warned both fighters of potential fight fixing when they noticed a big odd shift in the betting lines leading into the event. Therefore, Bang abandoned his plan and went on to win the fight. It was also reported that some mafia members issued death threats on Bang for they had bet US$1.7 million in favor of Kuntz to win.

== See also ==
- List of UFC events
- 2015 in UFC
