= Fredy Serrano =

Colombian freestyle wrestler

- Born: 22 September 1979 (age 47); Bogotá, Distrito Capital, Colombia
- Other names: El Profe
- Height: 5 ft 3 in (1.60 m)
- Weight: 125 lb (57 kg; 8.9 st)
- Division: Bantamweight; Flyweight
- Reach: 66.0
- Stance: Orthodox
- Team: Octagon MMA
- Rank: Blue belt in Brazilian Jiu-Jitsu
- Wrestling: Olympic Freestyle Wrestling
- Years active: 2013–present

Mixed martial arts record
- Total: 6
- Wins: 4
- By knockout: 2
- By decision: 1
- Unknown: 1
- Losses: 2
- By decision: 2

Amateur record
- Total: 2
- Wins: 2

Other information
- Mixed martial arts record from Sherdog

Fredy Serrano
Personal information
- Born: 22 September 1979 (age 47)
Medal record
Men's Wrestling
Representing Colombia
Pan American Games
Bronze medal – third place	2007 Rio	Freestyle (– 55 kg)

Freddy Alejandro Serrano Sichaca (born 22 September 1979) is a male former Olympic freestyle wrestler from Colombia and a current mixed martial artist. A professional MMA competitor since 2013, he has formerly competed for the UFC and was also on The Ultimate Fighter: Latin America.

== Wrestling career ==
Born in Bogotá, Distrito Capital, Serrano began wrestling in 1990 at the age of 11. In 2007 he became the 55 kg Pan Am bronze medalist.

=== 2008 Olympics ===
Serrano participated in Men's freestyle 55 kg at 2008 Summer Olympics as a representative of Colombia. He ended up losing to Abbas Dabbaghi from Iran in the Round of 16.

== Mixed martial arts career ==
=== Early career ===
At the beginning of 2013, Serrano retired from wrestling to focus on his MMA career. He had two unsanctioned MMA fights in 2013, both of which he won.

In March 2014, Serrano was announced as having signed an 8-fight contract with Resurrection Fighting Alliance. However, he never debuted before joining the cast of The Ultimate Fighter.

=== The Ultimate Fighter ===
In May 2014, Serrano was announced as a member of the cast of fighters participating The Ultimate Fighter: Latin America. He competed as a bantamweight for Team Werdum. In his first fight on the show, Serrano lost to Alejandro Pérez by unanimous decision.

Serrano faced former TUF: Latin America castmate Bentley Syler on 21 March 2015 at UFC Fight Night 62. Serrano won the fight by knockout in the third round. The win earned him a Performance of the Night bonus .

Serrano faced Yao Zhikui on 28 November 2015 at UFC Fight Night 79. He won the fight via TKO in the first round after Yao severely injured his arm while trying to defend a takedown.

Serrano was originally expected to face Ray Borg on 30 July 2016 at UFC 201. However Borg pulled out of the fight and was replaced by Ryan Benoit. He lost the fight via split decision.

Serrano faced Hector Sandoval on 17 December 2016 at UFC on Fox 22. He lost the fight via unanimous decision and was subsequently released from the promotion.

== Accomplishments ==
=== Mixed martial arts ===
- Ultimate Fighting Championship
  - Performance of the Night (One time) vs Bentley Syler
- MMAJunkie.com
  - 2015 March Knockout of the Month vs. Bentley Syler

== Mixed martial arts record ==
Professional record breakdown
6 matches	4 wins	2 losses
By knockout	2	0
By submission	0	0
By decision	1	2
Unknown	1	0

Res.	Record	Opponent	Method	Event	Date	Round	Time	Location	Notes
Win	4–2	Joseph Vieira da Silva	Decision (unanimous)	Empire Sports Marketing - Empire MMA 001	19 May 2018	3	5:00	Bogotá, Colombia	
Loss	3–2	Hector Sandoval	Decision (unanimous)	UFC on Fox: VanZant vs. Waterson	17 December 2016	3	5:00	Sacramento, California, United States	
Loss	3–1	Ryan Benoit	Decision (split)	UFC 201	30 July 2016	3	5:00	Atlanta, Georgia, United States	
Win	3–0	Yao Zhikui	TKO (arm injury)	UFC Fight Night: Henderson vs. Masvidal	28 November 2015	1	0:44	Seoul, South Korea	
Win	2–0	Bentley Syler	KO (punch)	UFC Fight Night: Maia vs. LaFlare	21 March 2015	3	1:34	Rio de Janeiro, Brazil	Performance of the Night.
Win	1–0	Andrés Ayala	N/A	Striker Fighting Championship 5	23 February 2013	N/A	N/A	Bogotá, Colombia	

=== Mixed martial arts exhibition record ===
Exhibition record breakdown		
1 match	0 wins	1 loss
By knockout	0	0
By submission	0	0
By decision	0	1

Res.	Record	Opponent	Method	Event	Date	Round	Time	Location	Notes
Loss	0–1	Alejandro Pérez	Decision (unanimous)	The Ultimate Fighter: Latin America	27 May 2014	3	5:00	Las Vegas, Nevada	

== See also ==
- List of current UFC fighters
- List of male mixed martial artists
