= UFC on Fox: VanZant vs. Waterson =

UFC mixed martial arts event in 2016

- The poster for UFC on Fox: VanZant vs. Waterson
- Promotion: Ultimate Fighting Championship
- Date: December 17, 2016
- Venue: Golden 1 Center
- City: Sacramento, California
- Attendance: 10,525
- Total gate: $1,238,992

Event chronology
UFC 206: Holloway vs. Pettis	UFC on Fox: VanZant vs. Waterson	UFC 207: Nunes vs. Rousey

UFC on Fox: VanZant vs. Waterson (also known as UFC on Fox 22) was a mixed martial arts event promoted by the Ultimate Fighting Championship and held on December 17, 2016, at Golden 1 Center in Sacramento, California.

== Background ==
After previously contesting four events in Sacramento at Sleep Train Arena, this was the first for the promotion at the newly built venue.

A women's bout between Paige VanZant and former Invicta FC Atomweight Champion Michelle Waterson served as the event headliner.

The event featured the final fight of former WEC Featherweight Champion and UFC Bantamweight Championship title challenger Urijah Faber, as he faced Brad Pickett, until he made a comeback in 2019.

As a result of the cancellation of UFC Fight Night: Lamas vs. Penn, bouts between James Moontasri vs. Alex Morono and Cole Miller vs. Mizuto Hirota were rescheduled for this event.

The event was televised on Fox, averaging 3.2 million viewers.

== Results ==
Main Card (Fox)
Weight class				Method	Round	Time	Notes
Women's Strawweight	Michelle Waterson	def.	Paige VanZant	Technical Submission (rear-naked choke)	1	3:21
Welterweight	Mickey Gall	def.	Sage Northcutt	Submission (rear-naked choke)	2	1:40
Bantamweight	Urijah Faber	def.	Brad Pickett	Decision (unanimous) (30–26, 30–26, 30–26)	3	5:00
Welterweight	Alan Jouban	def.	Mike Perry	Decision (unanimous) (29–28, 30–27, 30–27)	3	5:00
Preliminary Card (Fox Sports 1)
Light Heavyweight	Paul Craig	def.	Henrique da Silva	Submission (armbar)	2	1:59
Featherweight	Mizuto Hirota	def.	Cole Miller	Decision (unanimous) (30–26, 30–27, 30–27)	3	5:00
Welterweight	Colby Covington	def.	Bryan Barberena	Decision (unanimous) (30–27, 30–27, 30–27)	3	5:00
Welterweight	Alex Morono	def.	James Moontasri	Decision (unanimous) (29–28, 29–28, 29–28)	3	5:00
Lightweight	Josh Emmett	def.	Scott Holtzman	Decision (unanimous) (29–28, 29–28, 29–28)	3	5:00
Women's Bantamweight	Leslie Smith	def.	Irene Aldana	Decision (unanimous) (29–28, 29–28, 30–27)	3	5:00
Preliminary Card (UFC Fight Pass)
Bantamweight	Eddie Wineland	def.	Takeya Mizugaki	TKO (punches)	1	3:04
Flyweight	Hector Sandoval	def.	Fredy Serrano	Decision (unanimous) (30–27, 29–28, 30–27)	3	5:00
Welterweight	Sultan Aliev	def.	Bojan Veličković	Decision (split) (28–29, 30–27, 30–27)	3	5:00

== Bonus awards ==
The following fighters were awarded $50,000 bonuses:

- Fight of the Night: Leslie Smith vs. Irene Aldana
- Performance of the Night: Michelle Waterson and Paul Craig

== Reported payout ==
The following is the reported payout to the fighters as reported to the California State Athletic Commission. The total fighter payout for the event was $1,084,000. It does not include sponsor money and also does not include the UFC's traditional "fight night" bonuses.

- Michelle Waterson: $30,000 (includes $15,000 win bonus) def. Paige VanZant: $43,000
- Mickey Gall: $40,000 (includes $20,000 win bonus) def. Sage Northcutt: $60,000
- Urijah Faber: $320,000 (includes $160,000 win bonus) def. Brad Pickett: $40,000
- Alan Jouban: $54,000 (includes $27,000 win bonus) def. Mike Perry: $14,000
- Paul Craig: $20,000 (includes $10,000 win bonus) def. Luis Henrique da Silva: $14,000
- Mizuto Hirota: $34,000 (includes $17,000 win bonus) def. Cole Miller: $33,000
- Colby Covington: $54,000 (includes $27,000 win bonus) def. Bryan Barberena: $20,000
- Alex Morono: $30,000 (includes $15,000 win bonus) def. James Moontasri: $16,000
- Josh Emmett: $28,000 (includes $14,000 win bonus) def. Scott Holtzman: $17,000
- Leslie Smith: $50,000 (includes $25,000 win bonus) def. Irene Aldana: $12,000
- Eddie Wineland: $58,000 (includes $29,000 win bonus) def. Takeya Mizugaki: $39,000
- Hector Sandoval: $24,000 (includes $12,000 win bonus) def. Fredy Serrano: $12,000
- Sultan Aliev: $20,000 (includes $10,000 win bonus) def. Bojan Veličković: $12,000

== See also ==
- List of UFC events
- 2016 in UFC
