= Jon Tuck =

Guam martial artist

- Born: Jonathan Cruz Tuck; August 28, 1984 (age 42); Chalan Pago-Ordot, Guam
- Other names: Super Saiyan
- Height: 5 ft 11 in (1.80 m)
- Weight: 156 lb (71 kg; 11.1 st)
- Division: Lightweight
- Reach: 73 in (185 cm)
- Stance: Orthodox
- Fighting out of: Hagatna, Guam
- Team: Kings MMA; Guam Martial Arts Academy
- Rank: Black belt in Brazilian Jiu-Jitsu
- Years active: 2007–present

Mixed martial arts record
- Total: 16
- Wins: 11
- By knockout: 5
- By submission: 5
- By decision: 1
- Losses: 5
- By decision: 5

Other information
- Mixed martial arts record from Sherdog

Jon Tuck
Medal record

Representing Guam

Brazilian Jiu-Jitsu

World Professional Jiu-Jitsu Cup
| Gold medal – first place | 2010 Abu Dhabi, UAE | Open Light |
| Silver medal – second place | 2010 Abu Dhabi, UAE | -78 kg |

Jonathan Cruz Tuck (born August 28, 1984) is a Chamorro professional mixed martial artist. He is the first Chamorro native from Guam to be signed by the Ultimate Fighting Championship, and competes at the Lightweight division. His official nickname is the "Super Saiyan", taken from the Japanese manga series Dragon Ball.

== Background ==
Tuck grew up with a love of martial arts, which he attributes to being from the culture of warriors, the Chamorros. Tuck began training in Brazilian jiu-jitsu and MMA with his cousin, about six years before coming to the UFC. Tuck attended college at the University of Guam and was studying physical education before putting his education on hold because of his career in fighting. However, he does plan on finishing his college education in the near future. Before becoming a professional MMA fighter, Tuck also worked as a power plant operator.

== Mixed martial arts career ==
=== Early career ===
Tuck made his professional debut in 2007, earning his first win over Joe Nauta via rear-naked choke early in the first round. His second fight was against John Salas, winning via TKO (doctor stoppage).

On November 17, 2007, Tuck made his debut in Pacific Xtreme Combat against Giovanni Sablan. He shows his grappling skills by defeating Sablan via rear-naked choke. After a year layoff he returned to fighting. He defeated Thomas Calvo via Rear-Naked-Choke in the first round.

On November 21, 2009, he made his debut in Gorilla Warfare, in a Superfight against his toughest opponent yet, URCC Welterweight Champion, Martial Combat Champion, ONE FC Lightweight Champion Eduard Folayang. He defeated Folayang via KO in just eight seconds.

=== Brazilian Jiu-Jitsu career ===
Tuck competed in the World Professional Jiu-Jitsu Cup. He won the gold medal in the finals against Mohammed Naser in the Open Light division. Despite having a knee injury, Tuck competed in the -78 kg division placing second, which secured him the silver medal.

=== Comeback in MMA ===
After competing in Brazilian jiu-jitsu tournaments all over the world, Tuck finally returned to MMA, defeating former Strikeforce fighter Tristan Arenal. Tuck got hit with some solid punches, stayed calm and composed. Tuck got a takedown, then knocked Arenal unconscious with ground and pound punches.

=== The Ultimate Fighter ===
In February 2012, Tuck was announced as a cast member of The Ultimate Fighter 15. In his first fight, Tuck lost via unanimous decision to eventual finalist Al Iaquinta in the elimination round to get into the house. Tuck dislocated a toe during the fight.

=== Ultimate Fighting Championship ===
Tuck made his official promotional when he faced Zhang Tiequan on November 10, 2012, at UFC on Fuel TV 6. Tuck won the fight via unanimous decision.

Tuck was expected to face Norman Parke on April 20, 2013, at UFC on Fox 7. However, the bout was scrapped during the week leading up to the event as Tuck was forced out of the bout with an injury.

The rescheduled bout with Parke eventually took place on October 26, 2013, at UFC Fight Night 30. Tuck lost the fight via unanimous decision.

Tuck was expected to face Yosdenis Cedeno on June 7, 2014, at UFC Fight Night 42. However, Cedeno pulled out of the bout in early May citing an injury and was replaced by promotional newcomer Jake Lindsey. He won the fight via submission in the third round due to heel strikes to the body.

Tuck faced Kevin Lee on September 27, 2014, at UFC 178. He lost the fight via unanimous decision.

Tuck faced Tae Hyun Bang on May 16, 2015, at UFC Fight Night 66. Tuck won the fight via submission in the first round, which also produced a Performance of the Night bonus.

Tuck was expected to face Nick Hein on May 8, 2016, at UFC Fight Night 87. However, just days before the event, Hein pulled out citing injury. He was replaced by promotional newcomer Josh Emmett. Tuck lost the back and forth fight via split decision.

Tuck was scheduled to face Mehdi Baghdad on October 15, 2016, at UFC Fight Night 97. However, Baghdad pulled out of the fight in mid-September citing injury and was replaced by promotional newcomer Alex Volkanovski. In turn, the promotion announced on October 6 that they had cancelled the event entirely. Tuck was quickly rescheduled to face Damien Brown on November 27, 2016, at UFC Fight Night 101. He lost the fight by controversial split decision.

Tuck faced Takanori Gomi on June 17, 2017, at UFC Fight Night: Holm vs. Correia. He won the fight by submission (rear-naked choke) in the first round.

Tuck faced Drew Dober on August 25, 2018, at UFC Fight Night 135. He lost the fight by unanimous decision and was subsequently released from the promotion.

=== Bellator ===
On September 4, 2019, news surfaced that Tuck will be replacing injured Paul Redmond on short notice against Brandon Girtz at Bellator Dublin on September 27, 2019. Eventually only a week before the fight, Girtz withdrew from the bout due to an injury leading to Tuck being removed from the card as well.

== Championships and accomplishments ==
- Ultimate Fighting Championship
  - Performance of the Night (One time)

== Mixed martial arts record ==
Professional record breakdown
| 16 matches | 11 wins | 5 losses |
| By knockout | 5 | 0 |
| By submission | 5 | 0 |
| By decision | 1 | 5 |

| Res. | Record | Opponent | Method | Event | Date | Round | Time | Location | Notes |
|---|---|---|---|---|---|---|---|---|---|
| Win | 11–5 | Ryuichiro Sumimura | KO (punch) | Bellator & Rizin: Japan | December 29, 2019 | 1 | 3:45 | Saitama, Japan | |
| Loss | 10–5 | Drew Dober | Decision (unanimous) | UFC Fight Night: Gaethje vs. Vick | August 25, 2018 | 3 | 5:00 | Lincoln, Nebraska, United States | |
| Win | 10–4 | Takanori Gomi | Submission (rear-naked choke) | UFC Fight Night: Holm vs. Correia | June 17, 2017 | 1 | 1:12 | Kallang, Singapore | |
| Loss | 9–4 | Damien Brown | Decision (split) | UFC Fight Night: Whittaker vs. Brunson | November 27, 2016 | 3 | 5:00 | Melbourne, Australia | |
| Loss | 9–3 | Josh Emmett | Decision (split) | UFC Fight Night: Overeem vs. Arlovski | May 8, 2016 | 3 | 5:00 | Rotterdam, Netherlands | |
| Win | 9–2 | Tae Hyun Bang | Submission (rear-naked choke) | UFC Fight Night: Edgar vs. Faber | May 16, 2015 | 1 | 3:56 | Pasay, Philippines | Performance of the Night. |
| Loss | 8–2 | Kevin Lee | Decision (unanimous) | UFC 178 | September 27, 2014 | 3 | 5:00 | Las Vegas, Nevada, United States | Tuck was deducted one point for a groin kick in round two. |
| Win | 8–1 | Jake Lindsey | TKO (submission to heel strikes) | UFC Fight Night: Henderson vs. Khabilov | June 7, 2014 | 3 | 2:47 | Albuquerque, New Mexico, United States | |
| Loss | 7–1 | Norman Parke | Decision (unanimous) | UFC Fight Night: Machida vs. Munoz | October 26, 2013 | 3 | 5:00 | Manchester, England | |
| Win | 7–0 | Zhang Tiequan | Decision (unanimous) | UFC on Fuel TV: Franklin vs. Le | November 10, 2012 | 3 | 5:00 | Macau, SAR, China | |
| Win | 6–0 | Tristan Arenal | KO (punches) | Pacific Xtreme Combat 28 | November 26, 2011 | 1 | 3:47 | Pasig, Philippines | |
| Win | 5–0 | Eduard Folayang | KO (punch) | GW 3 | November 21, 2009 | 1 | 0:08 | Saipan, Northern Mariana Islands | |
| Win | 4–0 | Thomas Calvo | Submission (rear-naked choke) | Pacific Xtreme Combat 17 | March 27, 2009 | 1 | 1:58 | Mangilao, Guam | |
| Win | 3–0 | Giovanni Sablan | Submission (rear-naked choke) | Pacific Xtreme Combat 13 | November 17, 2007 | 1 | 4:41 | Mangilao, Guam | |
| Win | 2–0 | John Salas | TKO (doctor stoppage) | GHBW 2 | May 28, 2007 | 1 | 5:00 | Hagåtña, Guam | |
| Win | 1–0 | Joe Neuta | Submission (rear-naked choke) | GHBW 1 | February 9, 2007 | 1 | 2:13 | Agana, Guam | |

=== Mixed martial arts exhibition record ===
| Exhibition record breakdown | | |
| 1 match | 0 wins | 1 loss |
| By decision | 0 | 1 |

| Res. | Record | Opponent | Method | Event | Date | Round | Time | Location | Notes |
|---|---|---|---|---|---|---|---|---|---|
| Loss | 0–1 | Al Iaquinta | Decision (unanimous) | The Ultimate Fighter: Live | March 9, 2012 | 1 | 5:00 | Las Vegas, Nevada, United States | One-round TUF entry fight. |

== See also ==
- List of current UFC fighters
- List of male mixed martial artists
