= Marcel Fortuna =

Brazilian mixed martial artis

- Born: Marcel Fortuna; October 22, 1985 (age 40); Tubarao, Santa Catarina, Brazil
- Other names: Maozinha (Little Hands)
- Height: 6 ft 1 in (1.85 m)
- Weight: 185 lb (84 kg; 13.2 st)
- Division: Heavyweight; Light Heavyweight; Middleweight
- Reach: 74 in (188 cm)
- Fighting out of: Florida, United States
- Team: Ralph Gracie Jiu-Jitsu; Sanford MMA (2018–present)
- Rank: 3rd degree black belt in Brazilian Jiu-Jitsu
- Years active: 2011–2017, 2019

Mixed martial arts record
- Total: 14
- Wins: 10
- By knockout: 1
- By submission: 5
- By decision: 4
- Losses: 4
- By knockout: 1
- By decision: 3

Other information
- Mixed martial arts record from Sherdog

Marcel Fortuna (born October 22, 1985) is a Brazilian mixed martial artist currently competing in the Middleweight division of Titan FC. A professional mixed martial artist since 2011, Fortuna has previously competed in the Ultimate Fighting Championship.

== Background ==
Born and raised in Brazil, Fortuna began training in Brazilian Jiu-Jitsu at the age of 16, and went on to have an accomplished career in the sport. As a brown belt, Fortuna was a world champion, and won the South American, European, and Pan-American championships as a black belt. He moved to the United States in 2009, settling in Northern California.

== Mixed martial arts career ==
=== Ultimate Fighting Championship ===
Fortuna was later signed by the UFC and made his debut at UFC Fight Night: Bermudez vs. The Korean Zombie in a Heavyweight bout against Anthony Hamilton. Despite being undersized, Fortuna won via knockout with an overhand right in the first round. This fight earned him the Performance of the Night award.

Fortuna faced Jordan Johnson on July 7, 2017 at The Ultimate Fighter 25 Finale. He lost the fight by unanimous decision.

Fortuna faced Jake Collier on November 11, 2017 at UFC Fight Night: Poirier vs. Pettis. He lost the fight by unanimous decision.

On August 14, 2018, it was announced that Fortuna was released from UFC.

=== Post-UFC career ===
After splitting camps between his native Brazil and various gyms in California, Fortuna decided to move to Florida in order to train solely at Sanford MMA (formerly known as Hard Knocks 365). Fortuna faced Andreas Michailidis at Titan FC 54 on April 26, 2019. He lost the bout via spinning back kick in the first round.

== Championships and accomplishments ==
=== Mixed martial arts ===
- Ultimate Fighting Championship
  - Performance of the Night (One time) vs. Anthony Hamilton
- Dragon House
  - Dragon House Light Heavyweight Championship (Two successful title defenses)

== Mixed martial arts record ==
Professional record breakdown
14 matches	10 wins	4 losses
By knockout	1	1
By submission	5	0
By decision	4	3

Res.	Record	Opponent	Method	Event	Date	Round	Time	Location	Notes
Win	10–4	Tim Caron	Decision (unanimous)	PFC: Premier FC 31	September 18, 2021	3	5:00	Springfield, Massachusetts, United States	Middleweight bout.
Loss	9–4	Andreas Michailidis	TKO (spinning wheel kick and punches)	Titan FC 54	April 26, 2019	1	4:26	Fort Lauderdale, Florida, United States	Middleweight bout.
Loss	9–3	Jake Collier	Decision (unanimous)	UFC Fight Night: Poirier vs. Pettis	November 11, 2017	3	5:00	Norfolk, Virginia, United States	
Loss	9–2	Jordan Johnson	Decision (unanimous)	The Ultimate Fighter: Redemption Finale	July 7, 2017	3	5:00	Las Vegas, Nevada, United States	Return to Light Heavyweight.
Win	9–1	Anthony Hamilton	KO (punch)	UFC Fight Night: Bermudez vs. The Korean Zombie	February 4, 2017	1	3:10	Houston, Texas, United States	Heavyweight debut; Performance of the Night.
Win	8–1	David Mitchell	Decision (unanimous)	Dragon House 20	June 6, 2015	3	5:00	Oakland, California, United States	Defended the Dragon House Light Heavyweight Championship.
Win	7–1	Jordan Powell	Submission (side choke)	Dragon House 19	March 21, 2015	1	0:18	Oakland, California, United States	Defended the Dragon House Light Heavyweight Championship.
Win	6–1	Mike Ortega	Submission (rear-naked choke)	Dragon House 17	August 9, 2014	3	1:17	Oakland, California, United States	Won the vacant Dragon House Light Heavyweight Championship.
Win	5–1	Manny Murillo	Decision (unanimous)	Dragon House 16	May 3, 2014	3	5:00	Oakland, California, United States	Return to Light Heavyweight.
Win	4–1	CJ Marsh	Submission (baseball choke)	War MMA 1: Roberts vs. Baesman	June 22, 2013	2	2:40	Stockton, California, United States	Catchweight (195 lbs) bout.
Loss	3–1	Jesse Taylor	Decision (unanimous)	Dragon House 11	August 18, 2012	3	5:00	Oakland, California, United States	Middleweight debut.
Win	3–0	Sean Pierre	Decision (unanimous)	Impact MMA: Recognition	December 10, 2011	3	5:00	Pleasanton, California, United States	
Win	2–0	Ryan Williams	Submission (rear-naked choke)	Capitol Fighting Championships: Fall Classic	October 8, 2011	1	2:05	Sacramento, California, United States	
Win	1–0	David Villescaz	Submission (armbar)	Rebel Fights	April 16, 2011	1	2:23	Plymouth, California, United States	

== See also ==
- List of current UFC fighters
- List of male mixed martial artists
