= Yao Zhikui =

Chinese mixed martial arts fighter

- Born: Yao Zhikui; February 7, 1991 (age 35); Henan, China
- Other names: The Conqueror
- Nationality: Chinese
- Height: 5 ft 6 in (1.68 m)
- Weight: 125 lb (57 kg; 8.9 st)
- Division: Flyweight
- Reach: 64.0 in (163 cm)
- Fighting out of: Beijing, China
- Team: China Top Team
- Rank
- Years active: 2012-present

Mixed martial arts record
- Total: 8
- Wins: 3
- By knockout: 1
- By submission: 1
- By decision: 1
- Losses: 5
- By knockout: 2
- By submission: 0
- By decision: 3

Other information
- Mixed martial arts record from Sherdog

Yao Zhikui (born February 7, 1991) was a Chinese mixed martial artist who competed as a Flyweight for the Ultimate Fighting Championship.

== Background ==
Originally Henan Province of Central China, Yao competed in wrestling and trained in Sanda before moving to Beijing in order to pursue a career in professional mixed martial arts. Yao began training under the tutelage of former UFC Lightweight Zhang Tiequan.

== Mixed martial arts career ==
=== Early career ===
Yao made his professional debut in 2012, and compiled a record of 1 - 1, before getting the opportunity to appear on The Ultimate Fighter.

=== The Ultimate Fighter: China ===
In the fall of 2013, it was announced that Yao had been selected as one of the bantamweight participants for Team Sky Dragons on the inaugural season of The Ultimate Fighter: China.

In his first fight, Yao faced Allen Chong. He won the fight via knockout in the first round.

In the semifinal fight, Yao faced off against Yang Jianping. He lost the fight via unanimous decision and was subsequently eliminated from the competition.

=== Ultimate Fighting Championship ===
Yao made his promotional debut on August 23, 2014, in a flyweight bout against Royston Wee at UFC Fight Night 48. He lost the fight via split decision.

Yao faced Nolan Ticman on May 16, 2015, at UFC Fight Night 66. He won the fight via split decision.

Yao next faced Fredy Serrano on November 28, 2015, at UFC Fight Night 79. He lost the fight via TKO in the first round after Yao severely injured his arm while trying to defend a takedown.

Yao was expected to face promotional newcomer Jenel Lausa on October 15, 2016, at UFC Fight Night 97. However, the promotion announced on October 6 that they had cancelled the event entirely. In turn, the pairing was quickly rescheduled and is expected to take place on November 27, 2016, at UFC Fight Night 101. He lost the fight via unanimous decision.

== Mixed martial arts record ==
Professional record breakdown
8 matches	3 wins	5 losses
By knockout	1	2
By submission	1	0
By decision	1	3

Res.	Record	Opponent	Method	Event	Date	Round	Time	Location	Notes
Loss	3–5	Augustin Delarmino Jr.	TKO (punches)	CKF Macau	August 10, 2017	2	N/A	Macau	
Win	3–4	Swapnil	TKO (punches)	CKF 115	July 7, 2017	1	1:44	Xiangxi, China	Return to Bantamweight.
Loss	2–4	Jenel Lausa	Decision (unanimous)	UFC Fight Night: Whittaker vs. Brunson	November 27, 2016	3	5:00	Melbourne, Australia	
Loss	2–3	Fredy Serrano	TKO (arm injury)	UFC Fight Night: Henderson vs. Masvidal	November 28, 2015	1	0:44	Seoul, South Korea	
Win	2–2	Nolan Ticman	Decision (split)	UFC Fight Night: Edgar vs. Faber	May 16, 2015	3	5:00	Pasay, Philippines	Flyweight debut.
Loss	1–2	Royston Wee	Decision (split)	UFC Fight Night: Bisping vs. Le	August 23, 2014	3	5:00	Macau, SAR, China	
Win	1–1	Doayuan Wang	Submission (arm-triangle choke)	RUFF 9	May 18, 2013	1	0:37	Sanya, China	
Loss	0–1	Takayuki Iijima	N/A	Real Fight MMA Championship 1	December 1, 2012	N/A	N/A	Zhengzhou, China	Bantamweight debut.

== See also ==
- List of male mixed martial artists
