= UFC Fight Night: Bermudez vs. The Korean Zombie =

UFC mixed martial arts event in 2017

- The poster for UFC Fight Night: Bermudez vs. The Korean Zombie
- Promotion: Ultimate Fighting Championship
- Date: February 4, 2017
- Venue: Toyota Center
- City: Houston, Texas
- Attendance: 8,119
- Total gate: $611,133

Event chronology
UFC on Fox: Shevchenko vs. Peña	UFC Fight Night: Bermudez vs. The Korean Zombie	UFC 208: Holm vs. de Randamie

UFC Fight Night: Bermudez vs. The Korean Zombie (also known as UFC Fight Night 104) was a mixed martial arts event held by the Ultimate Fighting Championship on February 4, 2017, at the Toyota Center in Houston, Texas.

== Background ==
A featherweight bout between Dennis Bermudez and former UFC Featherweight Championship challenger Chan Sung Jung served as the event headliner. This was Jung's first bout since August 2013, as he returned from military service.

A lightweight bout between Evan Dunham and Abel Trujillo was originally booked for UFC Fight Night: Poirier vs. Johnson. However, Trujillo pulled out due to an undisclosed injury. The fight was later rescheduled for this event.

A women's strawweight bout between Jéssica Andrade and Invicta FC Strawweight Champion Angela Hill was briefly linked to UFC 207. However the fight never materialized for that event because of a rule in the UFC's anti-doping policy with USADA. Subsequently, Andrade was removed from that card with the pairing left intact and rescheduled to take place at this event.

On January 19, the card suffered multiple changes due to injury: Evan Dunham and Johnny Case pulled out of their respective fights against Abel Trujillo and James Vick. Subsequently, Trujillo and Vick were booked to face each other. Also, Sheldon Westcott was forced to withdraw from his bout against Alex Morono at the event. He was replaced by Niko Price.

Jan Błachowicz was expected to face former interim UFC Light Heavyweight Championship challenger Ovince Saint Preux, but pulled out on January 21 due to injury and was replaced by promotional newcomer Volkan Oezdemir.

Justin Ledet was expected to face promotional newcomer Dmitry Sosnovskiy at the event. However, Ledet pulled out of the fight on January 26 allegedly due to an undisclosed injury. Promotion officials elected to remove Sosnovskiy from the card and he will be rescheduled for another event.

At the weigh-ins, Bec Rawlings came in at 117.5 lb, 1.5 lb over the women's strawweight limit of 116 lb. As a result, Rawlings was fined 20% of her purse, which went to Tecia Torres and the bout proceeded as scheduled at catchweight.

== Results ==
Main Card (Fox Sports 1)
Weight class				Method	Round	Time	Notes
Featherweight	Chan Sung Jung	def.	Dennis Bermudez	KO (punch)	1	2:49
Women's Strawweight	Felice Herrig	def.	Alexa Grasso	Decision (unanimous) (29–28, 29–28, 30–27)	3	5:00
Lightweight	James Vick	def.	Abel Trujillo	Submission (D'Arce choke)	3	0:49
Light Heavyweight	Volkan Oezdemir	def.	Ovince Saint Preux	Decision (split) (29–28, 28–29, 29–28)	3	5:00
Heavyweight	Marcel Fortuna	def.	Anthony Hamilton	KO (punch)	1	3:10
Women's Strawweight	Jéssica Andrade	def.	Angela Hill	Decision (unanimous) (30–27, 30–27, 30–27)	3	5:00
Preliminary Card (Fox Sports 1)
Heavyweight	Curtis Blaydes	vs.	Adam Milstead	No Contest (overturned)	2	0:59	(Note: Originally a TKO (knee injury) win for Blaydes; overturned after he tested positive for marijuana.)
Featherweight	Chas Skelly	def.	Chris Gruetzemacher	Submission (rear-naked choke)	2	2:01
Bantamweight	Ricardo Ramos	def.	Michinori Tanaka	Decision (unanimous) (29–28, 30–27, 29–28)	3	5:00
Catchweight (117.5 lb)	Tecia Torres	def.	Bec Rawlings	Decision (unanimous) (30–27, 30–27, 30–27)	3	5:00
Preliminary Card (UFC Fight Pass)
Welterweight	Niko Price	vs.	Alex Morono	No Contest (overturned)	2	5:00	(Note: Originally a KO (punch) win for Price; overturned after he tested positive for marijuana.)
Light Heavyweight	Khalil Rountree Jr.	def.	Daniel Jolly	KO (knee)	1	0:52

== Bonus awards ==
The following fighters were awarded $50,000 bonuses:

- Fight of the Night: Jéssica Andrade vs. Angela Hill
- Performance of the Night: Chan Sung Jung and Marcel Fortuna

== Aftermath ==
Niko Price, Curtis Blaydes and Abel Trujillo all tested positive for marijuana in in-competition drug tests. All three have been suspended 90 days and fined $1,000 by the Texas Department of Licensing and Regulation (TDLR), sources said. Despite their test failures for marijuana, none are facing any sanctions from USADA, as it only suspends fighters for cannabis if their drug test comes back with more than 150 ng/ml of the substance’s metabolites. Victories by Price and Blaydes have been overturned to no contests.

On April 5, it was announced that Ledet accepted a four-month USADA's sanction for an anti-doping policy violation following an out-of-competition test conducted on January 12. He tested positive for 5α-androst-1-ene-3α-ol-17-one, a metabolite of 1-testosterone and 1-androstenedione. He provided USADA with an open container of a dietary supplement product he was using at the time of the relevant sample collection, which he had also declared on his sample collection paperwork and researched before using. The testing conclusively confirmed that the supplement Ledet was using at the time of his positive test was contaminated with 1-androstenedione. The period of ineligibility began on February 1, 2017, the date on which he was provisionally suspended from competition.

== See also ==
- List of UFC events
- 2017 in UFC
