= UFC 201 =

UFC mixed martial arts event in 2016

UFC 201: Lawler vs. Woodley
- The poster for UFC 201: Lawler vs. Woodley
- Promotion: Ultimate Fighting Championship
- Date: July 30, 2016
- Venue: Philips Arena
- City: Atlanta, Georgia
- Attendance: 10,240
- Total gate: $1,070,000
- Buyrate: 240,000

Event chronology
UFC on Fox: Holm vs. Shevchenko	UFC 201: Lawler vs. Woodley	UFC Fight Night: Rodríguez vs. Caceres

UFC 201: Lawler vs. Woodley was a mixed martial arts event produced by the Ultimate Fighting Championship held on July 30, 2016, at Philips Arena in Atlanta, Georgia.

== Background ==
This was the third event that the organization has hosted in Atlanta, following UFC 88 in September 2008 and UFC 145 in April 2012.

The event was headlined by a UFC Welterweight Championship bout between current champion Robbie Lawler and Tyron Woodley.

A UFC Flyweight Championship bout between current champion Demetrious Johnson and Wilson Reis was expected to serve as the co-main event. However, on July 8, it was announced that Johnson pulled out due to an undisclosed injury and the bout was rescheduled for UFC on Fox 24. Reis was expected to remain on the card against promotional newcomer Sean Santella, but a few days later Santella announced the bout was scrapped because the UFC said "he needed to get more medicals done and there wasn't enough time". In turn, Reis faced Hector Sandoval, another newcomer.

Cláudio Silva was expected to face Siyar Bahadurzada at the event. However, on June 16, Silva pulled out due to injury and was replaced by Jorge Masvidal. In turn, Bahadurzada pulled out of the bout on July 12 citing an illness and was replaced by The Ultimate Fighter: United States vs. United Kingdom winner Ross Pearson.

Ray Borg was expected to face Fredy Serrano at the event, but pulled out on July 21 due to injury and was replaced by Ryan Benoit.

Justin Scoggins was expected to face Ian McCall in a flyweight bout. However, two days before the event, Scoggins announced he was struggling during the weight cut and was not going to make the contracted weight. The UFC pulled Scoggins and canceled the bout and McCall still weighed in as an alternate. Scoggins announced he will move to bantamweight for his next fight. As a result, McCall reportedly received his fight purse and a "win" bonus.

== Results ==
Main Card
Weight class				Method	Round	Time	Notes
Welterweight	Tyron Woodley	def.	Robbie Lawler (c)	KO (punches)	1	2:12	(Note: For the UFC Welterweight Championship.)
Women's Strawweight	Karolina Kowalkiewicz	def.	Rose Namajunas	Decision (split) (28–29, 29–28, 29–28)	3	5:00
Welterweight	Jake Ellenberger	def.	Matt Brown	TKO (body kick and punches)	1	1:46
Bantamweight	Erik Pérez	def.	Francisco Rivera	Decision (unanimous) (30–26, 30–26, 29–28)	3	5:00
Flyweight	Ryan Benoit	def.	Fredy Serrano	Decision (split) (28–29, 29–28, 29–28)	3	5:00
Preliminary Card (Fox Sports 2)
Light Heavyweight	Nikita Krylov	def.	Ed Herman	KO (head kick)	2	0:40
Welterweight	Jorge Masvidal	def.	Ross Pearson	Decision (unanimous) (29–28, 29–28, 30–27)	3	5:00
Heavyweight	Anthony Hamilton	def.	Damian Grabowski	KO (punches)	1	0:14
Flyweight	Wilson Reis	def.	Hector Sandoval	Submission (rear-naked choke)	1	1:49
Preliminary Card (UFC Fight Pass)
Welterweight	Michael Graves	vs.	Bojan Veličković	Draw (majority) (30–27, 28–28, 28–28)	3	5:00
Lightweight	Damien Brown	def.	Cesar Arzamendia	KO (punches)	1	2:27

== Bonus awards ==
The following fighters were awarded $50,000 bonuses:

- Fight of the Night: Karolina Kowalkiewicz vs. Rose Namajunas
- Performance of the Night: Tyron Woodley and Jake Ellenberger

== Reported payout ==
The following is the reported payout to the fighters as reported to the Georgia Athletic and Entertainment Commission. It does not include sponsor money and also does not include the UFC's traditional "fight night" bonuses.

- Tyron Woodley: $340,000 (includes $70,000 win bonus) def. Robbie Lawler: $500,000
- Karolina Kowalkiewicz: $38,000 (includes $19,000 win bonus) def. Rose Namajunas: $46,000
- Jake Ellenberger: $150,000 (includes $75,000 win bonus) def. Matt Brown: $73,000
- Érik Pérez: $48,000 (includes $24,000 win bonus) def. Francisco Rivera: $23,000
- Ryan Benoit: $26,000 (includes $13,000 win bonus) def. Fredy Serrano: $12,000
- Nikita Krylov: $48,000 (includes $24,000 win bonus) def. Ed Herman: $51,000
- Jorge Masvidal: $114,000 (includes $57,000 win bonus) def. Ross Pearson: $54,000
- Anthony Hamilton: $32,000 (includes $16,000 win bonus) def. Damian Grabowski: $18,000
- Wilson Reis: $50,000 (includes $25,000 win bonus) def. Hector Sandoval: $12,000
- Michael Graves: $12,000 vs. Bojan Veličković: $14,000 ^
- Damien Brown: $20,000 (includes $10,000 win bonus) def. Cesar Arzamendia: $10,000

^ Both fighters earned show money; bout declared draw.

== Aftermath ==
On August 18, it was announced that USADA informed Francisco Rivera of a potential Anti-Doping Policy violation stemming from an out-of-competition sample collection on July 23. Additional information will be provided at the appropriate time as the process moves forward.

== See also ==
- List of UFC events
- 2016 in UFC
