= UFC Fight Night: Whittaker vs. Brunson =

UFC mixed martial arts event in 2016

- The poster for UFC Fight Night: Whittaker vs. Brunson
- Promotion: Ultimate Fighting Championship
- Date: November 27, 2016
- Venue: Rod Laver Arena
- City: Melbourne, Australia
- Attendance: 13,721
- Total gate: 2,200,000 AUD

Event chronology
UFC Fight Night: Bader vs. Nogueira 2	UFC Fight Night: Whittaker vs. Brunson	The Ultimate Fighter: Tournament of Champions Finale

UFC Fight Night: Whittaker vs. Brunson (also known as UFC Fight Night 101) was a mixed martial arts event produced by the Ultimate Fighting Championship held on November 27, 2016, at Rod Laver Arena in Melbourne, Australia.

== Background ==
This event was the second that the organization hosted in Melbourne, with the first being UFC 193 in November 2015.

The event was expected to be headlined by a middleweight rematch between former Strikeforce and UFC Middleweight Champion Luke Rockhold and former Strikeforce Middleweight Champion Ronaldo Souza. The duo first met in September 2011 at Strikeforce: Barnett vs. Kharitonov, in which Rockhold won a unanimous decision to capture Souza's title. However, on November 1, Rockhold was ruled out of the contest due to a sprained ACL. Subsequently, Souza was removed from the card entirely and is expected to be rescheduled for another event. In turn, a middleweight bout between The Ultimate Fighter: The Smashes welterweight winner Robert Whittaker and Derek Brunson was elevated to serve as the event headliner.

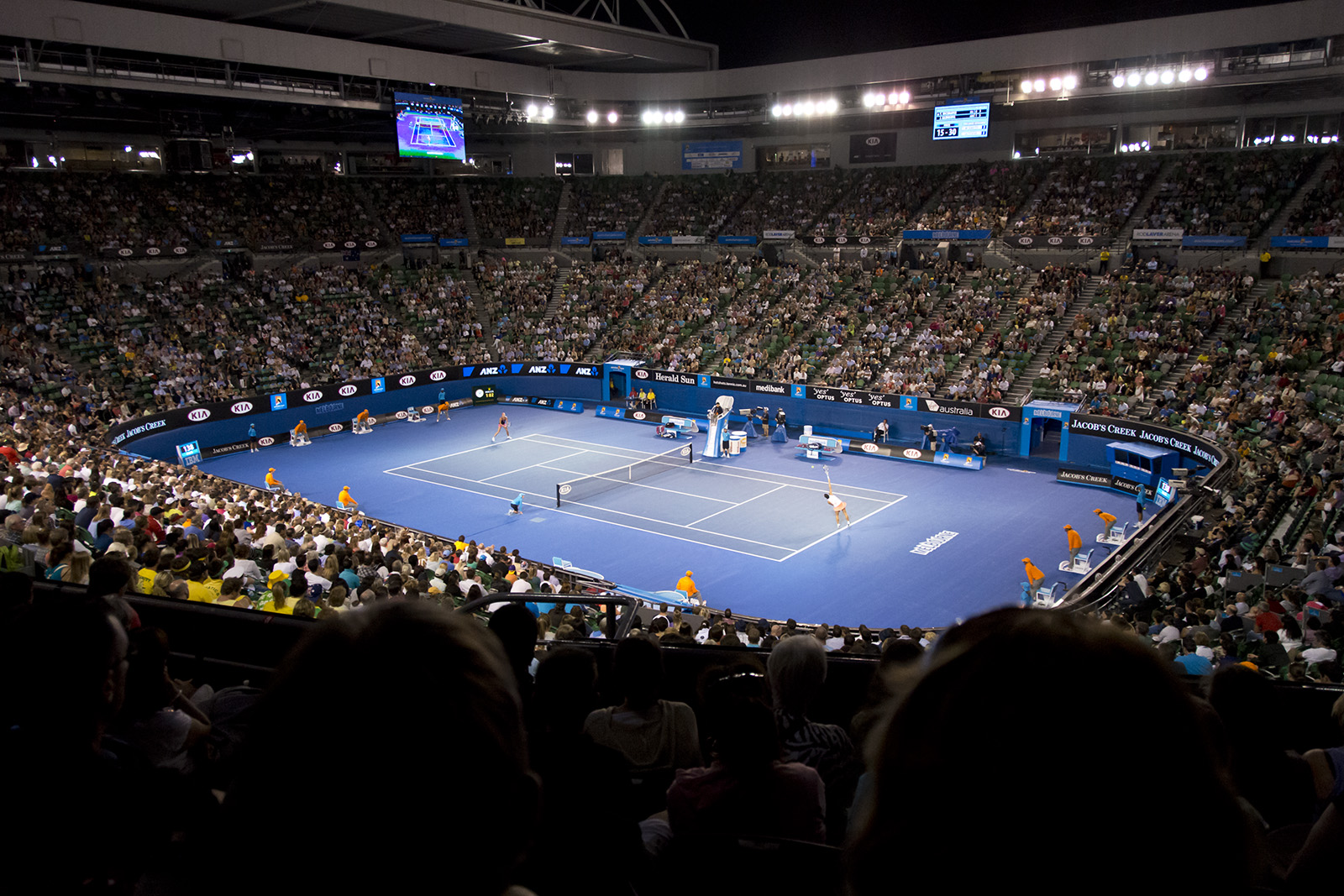
Rod Laver Arena is widely known as the venue which hosts the annual Australian Open in tennis.

As a result of the cancellation of UFC Fight Night: Lamas vs. Penn, bouts between Yao Zhikui vs. Jenel Lausa and Seo Hee Ham vs. Danielle Taylor were rescheduled for this event.

On October 21, it was announced that Dominique Steele pulled out of his scheduled bout against Kyle Noke due to an undisclosed injury and was replaced by Omari Akhmedov.

The Ultimate Fighter: China featherweight winner Ning Guangyou was expected to face Marlon Vera at UFC 202. However, due to an out-of-competition failed test and following investigation concluding Ning ingested the substance without fault or negligence, the bout was moved to UFC on Fox: Maia vs. Condit. In turn, the bout was postponed again due to alleged visa issues for Ning, which restricted the timing of his travel. The fight was later rescheduled for this event.

== Results ==
Main Card (Fox Sports 1)
Weight class				Method	Round	Time	Notes
Middleweight	Robert Whittaker	def.	Derek Brunson	TKO (head kick and punches)	1	4:07
Lightweight	Andrew Holbrook	def.	Jake Matthews	Decision (split) (29–28, 28–29, 29–28)	3	5:00
Welterweight	Omari Akhmedov	def.	Kyle Noke	Decision (unanimous) (29–28, 29–28, 30–27)	3	5:00
Lightweight	Alexander Volkanovski	def	Yusuke Kasuya	TKO (punches)	2	2:06
Light Heavyweight	Tyson Pedro	def.	Khalil Rountree Jr.	Submission (rear-naked choke)	1	4:07
Women's Strawweight	Danielle Taylor	def.	Seo Hee Ham	Decision (split) (28–29, 30–27, 30–27)	3	5:00
Preliminary Card (Fox Sports 1)
Middleweight	Dan Kelly	def.	Chris Camozzi	Decision (unanimous) (29–28, 29–27, 30–27)	3	5:00
Lightweight	Damien Brown	def.	Jon Tuck	Decision (split) (28–29, 29–28, 29–28)	3	5:00
Welterweight	Jonathan Meunier	def.	Richard Walsh	Decision (unanimous) (29–28, 30–27, 30–27)	3	5:00
Flyweight	Ben Nguyen	def.	Geane Herrera	Decision (unanimous) (30–27, 30–26, 30–27)	3	5:00
Preliminary Card (UFC Fight Pass)
Featherweight	Jason Knight	def.	Dan Hooker	Decision (unanimous) (29–28, 30–27, 30–26)	3	5:00
Featherweight	Marlon Vera	def.	Ning Guangyou	Decision (unanimous) (29–28, 29–28, 29–28)	3	5:00
Flyweight	Jenel Lausa	def.	Yao Zhikui	Decision (unanimous) (30–27, 30–27, 30–27)	3	5:00

== Bonus awards ==
The following fighters were awarded $60,000 bonuses:

- Fight of the Night: Robert Whittaker vs. Derek Brunson
- Performance of the Night: Robert Whittaker and Tyson Pedro

== See also ==
- 2016 in UFC
- List of UFC events
- Mixed martial arts in Australia
