= Royston Wee =

Singaporean martial artist

- Born: November 15, 1986 (age 39); Singapore
- Height: 5 ft 7 in (1.70 m)
- Weight: 135 lb (61 kg; 9.6 st)
- Division: Bantamweight
- Fighting out of: Singapore
- Team: Impact MMA
- Rank: Purple belt in Brazilian Jiu-Jitsu
- Years active: 2010–2015

Mixed martial arts record
- Total: 5
- Wins: 4
- By submission: 2
- By decision: 2
- Losses: 1
- By knockout: 1

Other information
- Website: www.impactmma.com.sg
- Mixed martial arts record from Sherdog

Royston Wee (born November 15, 1986) is a Singaporean mixed martial artist, currently competing as a bantamweight. Wee most recently competed in the Ultimate Fighting Championship (UFC). He is noted for being the first and only Singaporean fighter to be signed by the company. He trains out of and teaches MMA at Impact Mixed Martial Arts gym in Singapore.

== Education ==
Wee studied computer engineering at polytechnic.

Wee earned a double major in management and in marketing at Murdoch University in 2013.

== MMA career ==
Wee initially trained in Muay Thai, and then started training at Fight G in Singapore. Two years later he started training MMA at Impact MMA.

=== The Ultimate Fighter ===
In July 2013, Royston tried out for The Ultimate Fighter: China when tryouts were held in Singapore. Royston had only previously competed at flyweight, but the lightest weight class available for the tryouts was featherweight.

=== Ultimate Fighting Championship ===
Shortly thereafter Royston was signed by the UFC on a multi-fight contract. In his debut, he defeated Dave Galera by decision at UFC Fight Night 34 on January 4, 2014.

In his second bout with the promotion, Wee faced Yao Zhikui on August 23, 2014 at UFC Fight Night: Bisping vs. Le. He won via split decision, sustaining a broken nose in the fight.

Wee faced Ning Guangyou on May 16, 2015 at UFC Fight Night 66. He lost the fight via TKO in the second round and was subsequently released from the promotion on September 2, 2015.

== Mixed martial arts record ==
Professional record breakdown
5 matches	4 wins	1 loss
By knockout	0	1
By submission	2	0
By decision	2	0

Res.	Record	Opponent	Method	Event	Date	Round	Time	Location	Notes
Loss	4–1	Ning Guangyou	TKO (punches and elbows)	UFC Fight Night: Edgar vs. Faber	May 16, 2015	2	4:59	Pasay, Philippines	Catchweight (137 lbs) bout; Wee missed weight
Win	4–0	Yao Zhikui	Decision (split)	UFC Fight Night: Bisping vs. Le	August 23, 2014	3	5:00	Macau, SAR, China	
Win	3–0	Dave Galera	Decision (unanimous)	UFC Fight Night: Saffiedine vs. Lim	January 4, 2014	3	5:00	Marina Bay, Singapore	
Win	2–0	Syed Shahir	Submission (rear-naked choke)	Malaysian Fighting Championship 3	December 10, 2011	1	1:44	Kuala Lumpur, Malaysia	
Win	1–0	Mohammad Irfan	Submission	Malaysian Fighting Championship 2	November 12, 2011	1	1:05	Kuala Lumpur, Malaysia	

== See also ==
- List of male mixed martial artists
