= Damian Grabowski =

Polish mixed martial artist

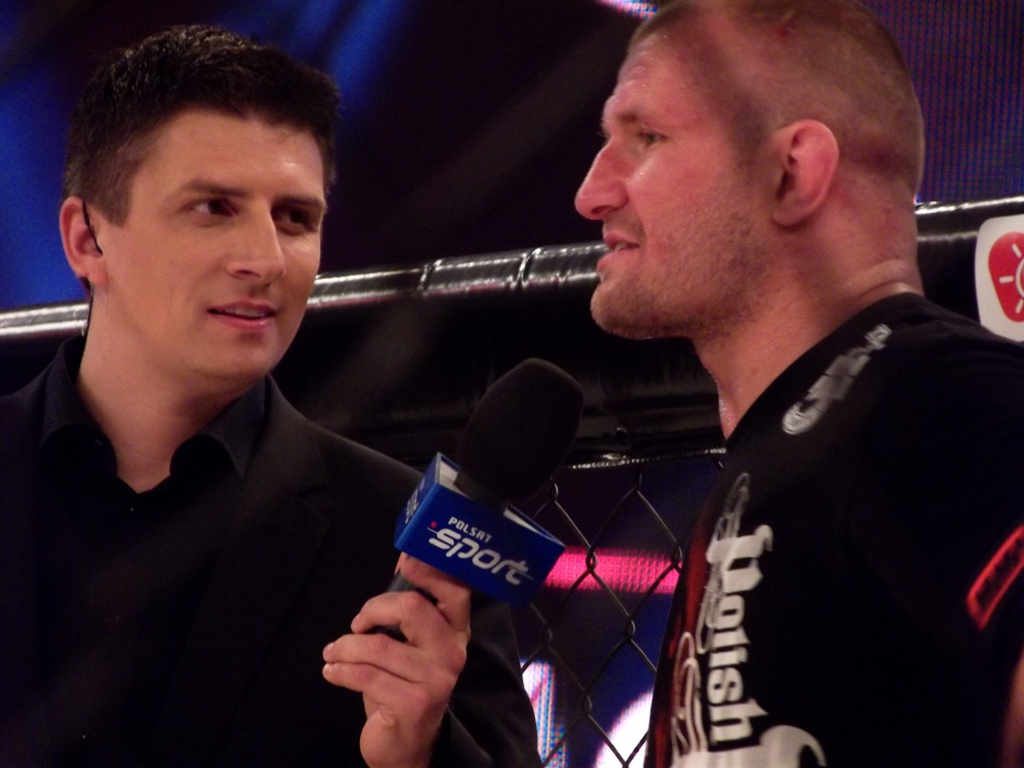
- Born: May 12, 1980 (age 46); Opole, Poland
- Other names: The Polish Pit Bull
- Nationality: Polish
- Height: 6 ft 1 in (1.85 m)
- Weight: 261 lb (118 kg; 18 st 9 lb)
- Division: Heavyweight
- Reach: 75 in (191 cm)
- Stance: Orthodox
- Fighting out of: Opole, Poland
- Team: Lutadores Opole; FightSpirit Gym
- Rank: Brown belt in Brazilian Jiu-Jitsu
- Years active: 2007-2019

Mixed martial arts record
- Total: 27
- Wins: 22
- By knockout: 8
- By submission: 11
- By decision: 3
- Losses: 5
- By knockout: 2
- By submission: 1
- By decision: 2

Other information
- Mixed martial arts record from Sherdog
- Last updated on: July 10, 2013

Damian Grabowski (born May 12, 1980) is a Polish professional mixed martial artist who last competed in 2019. A professional since 2007, he has fought in the UFC, Bellator, Konfrontacja Sztuk Walki (KSW), Fight Exclusive Night and M-1 Global.

== Biography ==
Grabowski is a multiple Brazilian Jiu-Jitsu champion of Poland, Vice Champion of the World and European Champion.

== Mixed martial arts career ==
=== European career ===
Grabowski defeated Kiril Handzhiyski at FX3 on June 13, 2009 in London (a last-minute replacement for Gary Rawlings).

Grabowski was then scheduled to fight PRIDE veteran Valentijn Overeem at a Beast of the East event in November in Gdynia, Poland and also Thorsten Kronz (known from Team Germany on M-1) on December 5 in Darmstadt, Germany on Mix Fight Gala IX. Damian sustained a shoulder injury during training just a few days before the Overeem fight and had to drop out of both bouts.

Grabowski then returned in 2008 with a first-round armbar win against Dion Staring and then fought in June against Michał Kita to determine the best heavyweight fighter in Poland. After connecting with a powerful upkick that cut the eyebrow of Kita, who slipped and fell out of the ring, Grabowski was declared the winner by doctor stoppage due to a heavily swollen eye.

Grabowski won bouts with Stav Economou at MMA Attack 3, with Tadas Rimkevicius at M-1 Challenge 39, and with Kenny Garner at M-1 Challenge 44: Battle of Kulikovo. The last one was for the M-1 Heavyweight Championship.

During M-1 Challenge 50 (August 15, 2014), Grabowski fought against his friend, also the Polish fighter, unbeaten Marcin Tybura. Tybura managed to take Grabowski down early in the first round and won the fight by mean of the north–south choke. Surprised, Grabowski didn't spare the compliments for Tybura after the fight, as the championship belt stayed in Poland.

=== Bellator ===
MMAROCKS.PL first announced in 2010 that Grabowski signed a contract with the American promotion Bellator and would compete in their heavyweight tournament at Bellator 25 in August 2010. His opponent in the first round was Scott Barrett. Grabowski won the fight via unanimous decision. He was expected to face Neil Grove in the semi-finals, but instead faced Cole Konrad. His thirteen-fight winning streak was snapped, as he lost the fight via unanimous decision, being unable to stop the takedowns of Konrad, the future winner of the tournament.

After defeating Joaquim Ferreira and Eddie Sanchez for the MMA Attack promotion, Grabowski fought one more time in Bellator in May 2012 where he defeated Dave Huckaba at Bellator 67.

=== Ultimate Fighting Championship ===
After amassing a record of 20 wins against 2 losses, Grabowski was signed by the UFC to a contract. He debuted against Derrick Lewis on February 6, 2016, at UFC Fight Night 82. He lost the fight via TKO in the first round.

Grabowski faced Anthony Hamilton on July 30, 2016, at UFC 201. He lost the fight via knockout in the first round.

Grabowski was expected to face Viktor Pešta on January 15, 2017, at UFC Fight Night 103. However, Grabowski was removed from the bout on December 21 for undisclosed reasons and was replaced by Alexey Oleynik.

Grabowski was expected to face Christian Colombo on May 28, 2017, at UFC Fight Night 109. However, the pairing was scrapped as both fighters sustained injuries in the weeks leading up to the event. The pairing was left intact and was rescheduled for July 22, 2017 at UFC on Fox 25. Subsequently, Colombo was removed from the fight on June 22 for undisclosed reasons and was replaced by Chase Sherman. Grabowski lost the fight by unanimous decision.

On August 14, 2018, it was announced that Grabowski was released from UFC.

=== KSW ===
After knocking out Karol Bedorf to start his stint in KSW, Grabowski was expected to challenge Phil De Fries for the KSW Heavyweight Championship at KSW 50 on September 14, 2019. However, Grabowski was forced to withdraw from the bout due to an injury.

== Championships and accomplishments ==
- Bellator Fighting Championships
  - Bellator Season 3 Heavyweight Tournament Semifinalist
- Ultimate Cage Fighters Championship
  - UCFC 2009 Heavyweight Tournament Winner
- M-1 Global
  - M-1 2013 Heavyweight Champion

== Mixed martial arts record ==
Professional record breakdown
27 matches	22 wins	5 losses
By knockout	8	2
By submission	11	1
By decision	3	2

Res.	Record	Opponent	Method	Event	Date	Round	Time	Location	Notes
Win	22–5	Karol Bedorf	TKO (punches)	KSW 49: Soldić vs. Kaszubowski	May 18, 2019	2	3:56	Gdańsk/Sopot, Poland	
Win	21–5	Jose Rodrigo Guelke	TKO (punches)	FEN 22: Poznań Fight Night	October 20, 2018	1	3:21	Poznań, Poland	
Loss	20–5	Chase Sherman	Decision (unanimous)	UFC on Fox: Weidman vs. Gastelum	July 22, 2017	3	5:00	Uniondale, New York, United States	
Loss	20–4	Anthony Hamilton	KO (punches)	UFC 201	July 30, 2016	1	0:14	Atlanta, Georgia, United States	
Loss	20–3	Derrick Lewis	TKO (punches)	UFC Fight Night: Hendricks vs. Thompson	February 6, 2016	1	2:17	Las Vegas, Nevada, United States	
Win	20–2	Konstantin Gluhov	Submission (arm-triangle choke)	M-1 Challenge 53: Battle in the Celestial Empire	November 25, 2014	3	1:47	Beijing, China	
Loss	19–2	Marcin Tybura	Technical Submission (north-south choke)	M-1 Challenge 50: Battle on Neva	August 15, 2014	1	1:28	St. Petersburg, Russia	Lost the M-1 Global Heavyweight Championship.
Win	19–1	Kenny Garner	Submission (arm-triangle choke)	M-1 Challenge 44: Battle Of Kulikovo	Nov 30, 2013	3	2:30	Tula, Russia	Won the M-1 Global Heavyweight Championship.
Win	18–1	Tadas Rimkevicius	TKO (punches)	M-1 Challenge 39	May 23, 2013	2	3:28	Moscow, Russia	
Win	17–1	Stav Economou	Decision (split)	MMA Attack 3	April 27, 2013	3	5:00	Katowice, Poland	
Win	16–1	Dave Huckaba	Decision (unanimous)	Bellator 67	May 4, 2012	3	5:00	Rama, Ontario, Canada	
Win	15–1	Eddie Sanchez	Submission (kimura)	MMA Attack 2	April 27, 2012	2	2:02	Katowice, Poland	
Win	14–1	Joaquim Ferreira	Submission (guillotine choke)	MMA Attack	November 5, 2011	1	2:57	Warsaw, Poland	
Loss	13–1	Cole Konrad	Decision (unanimous)	Bellator 29	September 16, 2010	3	5:00	Milwaukee, Wisconsin, United States	Bellator Season 3 Heavyweight Tournament Semifinal.
Win	13–0	Scott Barrett	Decision (unanimous)	Bellator 25	August 19, 2010	3	5:00	Chicago, Illinois, United States	Bellator Season 3 Heavyweight Tournament Quarterfinal.
Win	12–0	Michał Kita	TKO (doctor stoppage)	BOTE: Grabowski vs. Kita	June 12, 2010	1	3:25	Gdynia, Poland	
Win	11–0	Dion Staring	Submission (armbar)	BOTE: Chahbari vs. Souwer	January 30, 2010	2	2:44	Zutphen, Netherlands	
Win	10–0	Kiril Handzhiyski	Submission (rear-naked choke)	FX3: Rough Justice	June 13, 2009	1	1:27	London, England	
Win	9–0	Miodrag Petković	Submission (rear-naked choke)	UCFC: 20,000 Dollar Tournament	April 4, 2009	2	3:48	Vienna, Austria	UCFC 2009 Heavyweight Tournament Final.
Win	8–0	Lincon Rodrigues	Submission (kimura)	UCFC: 20,000 Dollar Tournament	April 4, 2009	1	2:24	Vienna, Austria	UCFC 2009 Heavyweight Tournament Semifinal.
Win	7–0	Martinsh Egle	TKO (punches)	UCFC: 20,000 Dollar Tournament	April 4, 2009	1	0:29	Vienna, Austria	UCFC 2009 Heavyweight Tournament Quarterfinal.
Win	6–0	Elvedin Tukić	TKO (punches)	UCFC: 20,000 Dollar Tournament	April 4, 2009	1	1:24	Vienna, Austria	UCFC 2009 Heavyweight Tournament Opening Round.
Win	5–0	Martin Čermák	TKO (submission to punches)	Pro Fight 3	February 22, 2009	1	1:02	Olsztyn, Poland	
Win	4–0	Deividas Banalities	Submission (arm-triangle choke)	Bushido Lithuania: Hero's 2008	November 8, 2008	2	1:52	Vilnius, Lithuania	
Win	3–0	Dion Staring	Submission (armbar)	Fight Sensation 3	May 24, 2008	1	N/A	Doetinchem, Netherlands	
Win	2–0	Ireneusz Cholewa	TKO (punches)	Mielnie Gala	July 18, 2007	1	N/A	Mielno, Poland	
Win	1–0	Paweł Kubiak	TKO (doctor stoppage)	Gladiator's Series	June 24, 2007	1	1:33	Tychy, Poland	

== See also ==
- List of male mixed martial artists
