= Anthony Hamilton (fighter) =

American mixed martial artist

- Born: April 14, 1980 (age 46); Kent, Washington, United States
- Other names: Freight Train
- Height: 6 ft 5 in (1.96 m)
- Weight: 261 lb (118 kg; 18.6 st)
- Division: Heavyweight
- Reach: 76 in (190 cm)
- Stance: Orthodox
- Fighting out of: Albuquerque, New Mexico, United States
- Team: Jackson's MMA
- Rank: Black belt in Brazilian Jiu-Jitsu
- Wrestling: NJCAA Wrestling
- Years active: 2010–present

Mixed martial arts record
- Total: 34
- Wins: 22
- By knockout: 11
- By submission: 2
- By decision: 9
- Losses: 12
- By knockout: 5
- By submission: 5
- By decision: 2

Other information
- Mixed martial arts record from Sherdog

External image
- Anthony Hamilton

Anthony Hamilton (born April 14, 1980) is an American mixed martial artist who most recently competed in the Heavyweight division. A professional competitor since 2010, Hamilton has also formerly competed for the UFC, MFC, and was the MFC inaugural Heavyweight Champion.

== Background ==
Originally from Kent, Washington, Hamilton competed in wrestling and football growing up, graduating from Kentwood High School, then attending Highline College, where he earned NJCAA All-American honors in wrestling. He later attended Central Washington University.

== Mixed martial arts career ==
=== Early career ===
Hamilton went undefeated during his amateur career (4–0) before turning professional in October 2010. Prior to signing with the UFC, Hamilton competed for the Maximum Fighting Championship, claiming their inaugural heavyweight championship after defeating Smealinho Rama at MFC 38: Behind Enemy Lines on October 4, 2013. He defended the title once by defeating Ultimate Fighter 10 contestant Darrill Schoonover at MFC 39: No Remorse on January 17, 2014.

Hamilton signed with the UFC in early 2014.

=== Ultimate Fighting Championship ===
In his promotional debut, Hamilton faced Alexey Oleynik at UFC Fight Night: Swanson vs. Stephens. He lost the fight via neck crank submission in the first round.

In his second appearance, Hamilton faced Ruan Potts at UFC 177 on August 30, 2014. He won the fight via TKO in the second round.

Hamilton next faced Todd Duffee at UFC 181 on December 6, 2014. He lost the fight via KO in the first round.

Hamilton faced Daniel Omielańczuk on April 11, 2015, at UFC Fight Night 64. Hamilton won the fight by unanimous decision (29–28, 29–28, and 29–27).

Hamilton was expected to face Derrick Lewis on October 3, 2015, at UFC 192. However, Hamilton was pulled from the fight and replaced by Viktor Pešta. In turn, Hamilton was rescheduled to face Mirko Cro Cop on November 28, 2015, at UFC Fight Night 79. However, on November 10, it was announced that Filipović had pulled out of the fight and abruptly announced his retirement. Subsequently, UFC officials removed Hamilton from the card and announced that he would be rescheduled for another event.

Hamilton faced Shamil Abdurakhimov on February 21, 2016, at UFC Fight Night 83. He lost the fight by unanimous decision.

Hamilton faced Damian Grabowski on July 30, 2016, at UFC 201. He won the fight via knockout just 14 seconds into the first round.

Hamilton faced Francis Ngannou on December 9, 2016, at UFC Fight Night 102. He lost the fight via submission in the first round.

Hamilton faced promotional newcomer Marcel Fortuna on February 4, 2017, at UFC Fight Night 104. He lost the fight by knockout in the first round.

Hamilton faced Daniel Spitz on September 16, 2017, at UFC Fight Night: Rockhold vs. Branch. He lost the fight via TKO in the first round in 24 seconds.

Hamilton announced his retirement from professional MMA fighting on his social network after his loss to Splitz on September 16, 2017, at UFC Fight Night: Rockhold vs. Branch.

Shortly after his announced from retirement, he was called to replace Dmitrii Smolyakov to face promotional newcomer Adam Wieczorek on October 21, 2017, at UFC Fight Night: Cowboy vs. Till. However, the bout was scratched a day before the event due to "safety concerns," as a few Lechia Gdańsk ultras – extreme and sometimes violent supporters of the local football team – showed up just prior to the weigh-ins. Wieczorek is a supporter of Ruch Chorzów, a Lechia Gdańsk rival team. The fighters were absent from ceremonial weigh-ins due to that reason, but the bout was eventually canceled and rescheduled for UFC Fight Night: Werdum vs. Tybura a month later. Hamilton lost the bout by unanimous decision.

=== Post-UFC ===
After four consecutive losses, Hamilton was released from the UFC. In 2018, Hamilton returned to the regional circuit, and is 3-1 since his departure from the Las Vegas-based promotion.

Hamilton faced Rizvan Kuniev for the EFC Heavyweight Championship at Eagle FC 46 on March 11, 2022. After getting hit in the body by knees, Hamilton soon after lost the bout due to guillotine choke in the first round.

== Championships and accomplishments ==
- UFC
  - Fourth-fastest KO in the Heavyweight division (14 seconds)
- Maximum Fighting Championship
  - MFC Heavyweight Championship (One time)
  - One Successful Championship Defense
- CageSport
  - CS Heavyweight Championship (One time)
  - One Successful Championship Defense

== Mixed martial arts record ==
Professional record breakdown
35 matches	23 wins	12 losses
By knockout	12	5
By submission	2	5
By decision	9	2

Res.	Record	Opponent	Method	Event	Date	Round	Time	Location	Notes
Win	23-12	Matt Howell	TKO (punches)	COGA Combat Games 90	January 31, 2026	2	1:04	Tulalip, Washington, United States	
Win	22–12	Jared Torgeson	TKO (punches)	WFC 175	May 10, 2025	1	4:39	Tacoma, Washington, United States	
Loss	21–12	Jordan Currie	Submission (rear-naked choke)	COGA Combat Games 82	November 2, 2024	2	3:42	Ferndale, Washington, United States	Lost the COGA Heavyweight Championship.
Win	21–11	Matt Howell	TKO (punches)	COGA Combat Games: Summer Showdown 2023	July 29, 2023	1	3:15	Tulalip Bay, Washington, United States	Defended the COGA Heavyweight Championship.
Win	20–11	Matt Howell	Decision (unanimous)	COGA Combat Games 74	April 15, 2023	5	5:00	Suquamish, Washington, United States	Defended the COGA Heavyweight Championship.
Win	19–11	Juan Figueroa	TKO (punches)	COGA Combat Games 72	January 14, 2023	3	1:27	Tulalip Bay, Washington, United States	Won the COGA Heavyweight Championship.
Loss	18–11	Rizvan Kuniev	Submission (guillotine choke)	Eagle FC 46	March 11, 2022	1	1:17	Miami, Florida, United States	For the Eagle FC Heavyweight Championship.
Loss	18–10	Vladimir Dayneko	TKO (punches)	Eagle FC 40	September 4, 2021	1	2:56	Almetyevsk, Russia	
Win	18–9	Jared Torgeson	Decision (unanimous)	CageSport 55	February 9, 2019	3	5:00	Tacoma, Washington, United States	
Win	17–9	Dylan Potter	Decision (unanimous)	Dominate FC 2	September 15, 2018	3	5:00	Tacoma, Washington, United States	
Win	16–9	Randy Zarza	Submission (rear-naked choke)	COGA Combat Sports: Rumble on the Ridge 41	April 21, 2018	2	1:49	Snoqualmie, Washington, United States	
Loss	15–9	Adam Wieczorek	Decision (unanimous)	UFC Fight Night: Werdum vs. Tybura	November 19, 2017	3	5:00	Sydney, Australia	
Loss	15–8	Daniel Spitz	TKO (punches)	UFC Fight Night: Rockhold vs. Branch	September 16, 2017	1	0:24	Pittsburgh, Pennsylvania, United States	
Loss	15–7	Marcel Fortuna	KO (punch)	UFC Fight Night: Bermudez vs. The Korean Zombie	February 4, 2017	1	3:10	Houston, Texas, United States	
Loss	15–6	Francis Ngannou	Submission (kimura)	UFC Fight Night: Lewis vs. Abdurakhimov	December 9, 2016	1	1:57	Albany, New York, United States	
Win	15–5	Damian Grabowski	KO (punches)	UFC 201	July 30, 2016	1	0:14	Atlanta, Georgia, United States	
Loss	14–5	Shamil Abdurakhimov	Decision (unanimous)	UFC Fight Night: Cowboy vs. Cowboy	February 21, 2016	3	5:00	Pittsburgh, Pennsylvania, United States	
Win	14–4	Daniel Omielańczuk	Decision (unanimous)	UFC Fight Night: Gonzaga vs. Cro Cop 2	April 11, 2015	3	5:00	Kraków, Poland	
Loss	13–4	Todd Duffee	KO (punch)	UFC 181	December 6, 2014	1	0:33	Las Vegas, Nevada, United States	
Win	13–3	Ruan Potts	TKO (body punches)	UFC 177	August 30, 2014	2	4:17	Sacramento, California, United States	
Loss	12–3	Alexey Oleynik	Submission (scarf-hold headlock)	UFC Fight Night: Swanson vs. Stephens	June 28, 2014	1	2:18	San Antonio, Texas, United States	
Win	12–2	Darrill Schoonover	Decision (unanimous)	Maximum FC 39	January 17, 2014	5	5:00	Edmonton, Alberta, Canada	Defended the Maximum FC Heavyweight Championship.
Win	11–2	Smealinho Rama	KO (head kick)	Maximum FC 38	October 4, 2013	2	0:12	Edmonton, Alberta, Canada	Won the Maximum FC Heavyweight Championship.
Win	10–2	Matt Kovacs	TKO (punches)	CageSport 26	August 24, 2013	1	2:14	Tacoma, Washington, United States	Defended the CageSport Heavyweight Championship.
Win	9–2	Will Courchaine	Submission (armbar)	COGA Combat Sports: Rumble on the Ridge 27	March 16, 2013	1	1:37	Snoqualmie, Washington, United States	
Win	8–2	Bill Widler	TKO (punches)	CageSport 22	December 1, 2012	1	0:38	Fife, Washington, United States	Won the vacant CageSport Heavyweight Championship.
Win	7–2	Mike Riddell	KO (punch)	COGA Combat Sports: Rumble on the Ridge 26	November 3, 2012	1	0:07	Snoqualmie, Washington, United States	
Loss	6–2	Fabiano Scherner	Submission (arm-triangle choke)	SportFight: Battle of the Bay 2	August 4, 2012	1	2:02	Manson, Washington, United States	
Loss	6–1	Walt Harris	KO (punches)	Superior Cage Combat 4	February 16, 2012	1	1:15	Las Vegas, Nevada, United States	
Win	6–0	Matt Kovacs	TKO (punches)	COGA Combat Sports: Rumble on the Ridge 21	December 10, 2011	2	N/A	Snoqualmie, Washington, United States	Won the vacant COGA Heavyweight Championship.
Win	5–0	Rath Cyrus	Decision (unanimous)	COGA Combat Sports: Rumble on the Ridge 20	October 15, 2011	3	5:00	Snoqualmie, Washington, United States	
Win	4–0	Josh Bennett	TKO (punches)	COGA Combat Sports: Rumble on the Ridge 19	August 27, 2011	3	3:33	Snoqualmie, Washington, United States	
Win	3–0	Jesus Rodriguez	Decision (unanimous)	COGA Combat Sports: Rumble on the Ridge 18	May 14, 2011	3	5:00	Snoqualmie, Washington, United States	
Win	2–0	Jared Torgeson	Decision (unanimous)	CageSport 13	February 19, 2011	3	5:00	Tacoma, Washington, United States	
Win	1–0	Kyle Welch	Decision (unanimous)	CageSport 12	October 2, 2010	3	5:00	Tacoma, Washington, United States	Heavyweight debut.

== See also ==
- List of current UFC fighters
- List of male mixed martial artists
