= Jenel Lausa =

Filipino boxer

- Born: August 1, 1988 (age 38); Iloilo City, Philippines
- Other names: The Demolition Man
- Height: 5 ft 5 in (1.65 m)
- Weight: 125 lb (57 kg; 8.9 st)
- Division: Flyweight
- Style: Boxing
- Stance: Orthodox
- Fighting out of: Manila, Philippines
- Team: Team Capanay
- Years active: 2011–2022

Professional boxing record
- Total: 11
- Wins: 10
- By knockout: 6
- Draws: 1

Mixed martial arts record
- Total: 15
- Wins: 7
- By knockout: 2
- By submission: 2
- By decision: 3
- Losses: 8
- By submission: 2
- By decision: 6

Other information
- Mixed martial arts record from Sherdog

Jenel Lausa (born August 1, 1988) is a Filipino professional boxer and a mixed martial artist who competed in the Flyweight division of the Ultimate Fighting Championship.

== Mixed martial arts career ==
Lausa made his professional debut in Asia's first professional MMA promotion, URCC, in 2011 as a flyweight.

In 2013, he signed with Pacific Xtreme Combat (PXC). He compiled a record of 5 wins and 1 loss and a flyweight championship, with 4 straight wins before signing with the UFC.

=== Ultimate Fighting Championship ===
Lausa was scheduled to make his promotional debut on October 15, 2016, against Yao Zhikui at UFC Fight Night 97. However, due to the cancellation of the event, Lausa's match with Yao was moved to a later event at UFC Fight Night 101 on November 27, 2016. Lausa won the fight by unanimous decision.

Lausa faced promotional newcomer Magomed Bibulatov on April 8, 2017, at UFC 210. He lost the fight via unanimous decision.

Lausa was expected to face Naoki Inoue on September 23, 2017, at UFC Fight Night 117. However, Inoue pulled out on September 9 due to a dislocated shoulder. As a result, Lausa was removed from the card and is expected to be rescheduled against a new opponent at a future event.

Lausa faced Eric Shelton on November 19, 2017, at UFC Fight Night: Werdum vs. Tybura. He lost the fight by unanimous decision.

Lausa was scheduled to face Ashkan Mokhtarian on June 13, 2018, at UFC Fight Night 132. However, it was reported on May 2, 2018, that Mokhtarian pulled from the fight citing injury and he is replaced by Ulka Sasaki. Lausa lost the fight in round two via a rear-naked choke submission. He was released by the UFC on June 24, 2018.

=== BRAVE CF ===
Lausa returned to MMA after taking two years to focus on boxing to face Ryskulbek Ibraimov at BRAVE CF 47 on March 11, 2021. He lost the fight via unanimous decision.

Lausa next appeared at UAE Warriors 28 against Abdula Aliev on March 26, 2022. He lost the bout via technical decision after being unable to continue in the third round due to a groin strike.

Lausa faced Dansheel Moodley on November 26, 2022, at BRAVE CF 66, losing the bout via unanimous decision.

== Championships and accomplishments ==
- Pacific Xtreme Combat
  - Flyweight Champion (One time)

== Mixed martial arts record ==
Professional record breakdown
15 matches	7 wins	8 losses
By knockout	2	0
By submission	2	2
By decision	3	6

Res.	Record	Opponent	Method	Event	Date	Round	Time	Location	Notes
Loss	7–8	Dansheel Moodley	Decision (unanimous)	Brave CF 66	November 26, 2022	3	5:00	Bali, Indonesia	Return to Flyweight.
Loss	7–7	Abdula Aliev	Technical Decision (unanimous)	UAE Warriors 28	March 26, 2022	3	0:23	Abu Dhabi, United Arab Emirates	Strawweight debut. Accidental groin strike rendered Lausa unable to continue
Loss	7–6	Ryskulbek Ibraimov	Decision (unanimous)	Brave CF 47	March 11, 2021	3	5:00	Arad, Bahrain	
Loss	7–5	Ulka Sasaki	Submission (rear-naked choke)	UFC Fight Night: Cowboy vs. Edwards	June 23, 2018	2	4:04	Kallang, Singapore	
Loss	7–4	Eric Shelton	Decision (unanimous)	UFC Fight Night: Werdum vs. Tybura	November 19, 2017	3	5:00	Sydney, Australia	
Loss	7–3	Magomed Bibulatov	Decision (unanimous)	UFC 210	April 8, 2017	3	5:00	Buffalo, New York, United States	Bibulatov was deducted one point in round 2 due to a groin strike.
Win	7–2	Yao Zhikui	Decision (unanimous)	UFC Fight Night: Whittaker vs. Brunson	November 26, 2016	3	5:00	Melbourne, Australia	
Win	6–2	Crisanto Pitpitunge	Decision (split)	Pacific Xtreme Combat 51	January 16, 2016	5	5:00	Parañaque, Philippines	Won the vacant PXC Flyweight Championship.
Win	5–2	Ernesto Montilla	KO (punch)	Pacific Xtreme Combat 48	June 13, 2015	1	4:59	Pasig, Philippines	
Win	4–2	Dean Bermudez	Submission (guillotine choke)	Pacific Xtreme Combat 46	November 15, 2014	1	3:06	Pasig, Philippines	
Win	3–2	Venson Delopere	Decision (unanimous)	Pacific Xtreme Combat 43	May 29, 2014	3	5:00	Pasig, Philippines	
Loss	2–2	Ernesto Montilla	Decision (unanimous)	Pacific Xtreme Combat 41	November 9, 2013	3	5:00	Pasig, Philippines	
Win	2–1	Adam Cacay	TKO (referee stoppage)	Pacific Xtreme Combat 39	September 14, 2013	3	4:45	Pasig, Philippines	
Loss	1–1	Joseph Amurao	Submission (rear-naked choke)	Team Lakay Wushu Xanda: MMA Eliminations 5	April 14, 2012	2	N/A	La Trinidad, Philippines	
Win	1–0	Ramie Crisostomo	Submission (guillotine choke)	URCC: Bacolod Brawl 2011	October 16, 2011	1	6:50	Bacolod, Philippines	Flyweight debut.

== Professional boxing record ==
10 Wins (6 knockouts, 4 decisions), 0 Loss, 1 Draws
Res.	Record	Opponent	Type	Round Time	Date	Location	Notes
Win	10–0–1	(Indonesia) Carlos Lopez	KO	5 (12) 0:54	2019-09-07	(Philippines) Rizal Park, Digos, Davao del Sur	
Win	9–0–1	(Philippines) Angelito Merin	TKO	6 (10) 1:02	2019-07-20	(Philippines) Quibors Boxing Gym, Bacoor, Cavite	
Win	8–0–1	(Philippines) Rolly Llino	SD	6	2019-02-16	(Philippines) SM City North EDSA Skydome, Quezon City	
Draw	7–0–1	(Philippines) Jhunriel Ramonal	MD	8	2018-11-30	(Philippines) Biñan Town Plaza, Biñan, Laguna	
Win	7–0	(Philippines) Jon Jon Estrada	SD	10	2016-07-09	(Philippines) Makati Cinema Square Boxing Arena, Makati, Metro Manila	Won interim Philippines Boxing Federation (PBF) super bantamweight title
Win	6–0	(Philippines) Roy Lagrada	TKO	1 (8) 1:17	2016-04-30	(Philippines) Makati Cinema Square Boxing Arena, Makati, Metro Manila	
Win	5–0	(Philippines) Jeson Berwela	TKO	1 (8) 2:09	2015-10-30	(Philippines) South Ville 3 NHA, Barangay Poblacion, Muntinlupa, Metro Manila	
Win	4–0	(Philippines) Benjie Baron	MD	6	2015-08-29	(Philippines) Biñan Town Plaza, Biñan, Laguna	
Win	3–0	(Philippines) Marco Niones	RTD	4 (6) 3:00	2015-04-24	(Philippines) Makati Cinema Square Boxing Arena, Makati, Metro Manila	
Win	2–0	(Philippines) Mark Lester Gasta	RTD	1 (4) 3:00	2015-03-06	(Philippines) Paseo Commercial Center, Santa Rosa City, Laguna	
Win	1–0	(Philippines) Albert Campilan	UD	4	2014-07-26	(Philippines) Mandaluyong Gym, Mandaluyong Sports Center, Mandaluyong, Metro Manila	Professional debut.

== See also ==
- List of current UFC fighters
- List of male mixed martial artists
