= UFC 206 =

UFC mixed martial arts event in 2016

UFC 206: Holloway vs. Pettis
- The poster for UFC 206: Holloway vs. Pettis
- Promotion: Ultimate Fighting Championship
- Date: December 10, 2016
- Venue: Air Canada Centre
- City: Toronto, Ontario, Canada
- Attendance: 18,057
- Total gate: $1,843,101

Event chronology
UFC Fight Night: Lewis vs. Abdurakhimov	UFC 206: Holloway vs. Pettis	UFC on Fox: VanZant vs. Waterson

UFC 206: Holloway vs. Pettis was a mixed martial arts event produced by the Ultimate Fighting Championship (UFC) held on December 10, 2016, at the Air Canada Centre in Toronto, Ontario, Canada.

== Background ==
A UFC Light Heavyweight Championship rematch between the former champion Daniel Cormier and Anthony Johnson was originally expected to headline the event. The pairing met previously in May 2015 at UFC 187 with Cormier winning the fight (and the vacant title) via submission in the third round. However, on November 25, Cormier pulled out due to injury and the bout was scrapped. Promotion officials reportedly tried to book Johnson against former Strikeforce Light Heavyweight Champion Gegard Mousasi, but the former opted to wait for Cormier to return. The bout was rescheduled for UFC 210. Therefore, a featherweight bout between Max Holloway and former UFC Lightweight Champion Anthony Pettis was shifted to the headlining spot. Another component was added to the fight, as it was expected to be for the interim UFC Featherweight Championship status. The current champion (as well as lightweight champion) Conor McGregor vacated his title and former champion/current interim titleholder José Aldo became the undisputed champion.

Promotional newcomer Poliana Botelho was expected to face former UFC Women's Strawweight Championship challenger Valérie Létourneau at the event. However, Botelho was removed from the fight for undisclosed reasons on October 26 and was replaced by fellow newcomer Viviane Pereira.

Former UFC Flyweight Championship challenger John Moraga was expected to face former Bellator Bantamweight Champion Zach Makovsky at the event. However, Moraga pulled out of the fight in early November citing injury and was replaced by Dustin Ortiz.

A middleweight bout between Tim Kennedy and former UFC Light Heavyweight Champion and divisional newcomer Rashad Evans was originally booked for UFC 205. However, Evans was pulled from the fight days before the event after an undisclosed irregularity was found during his pre-fight medical exam. Subsequently, Kennedy was removed from the card as well. The fight was later rescheduled for this event. Subsequently, Evans once again was unable to obtain medical clearance to compete on the card and was pulled from the bout on November 21. An irregularity in his pre-fight MRI was responsible for both removals and he is expected to undergo an additional screening with a neurologist to prove he is healthy enough to fight, before possibly returning to the cage in January or February, according to his manager. The Ultimate Fighter: Team Jones vs. Team Sonnen middleweight winner Kelvin Gastelum was announced as his replacement on November 26, pending commission approval due to his suspension after UFC 205. He was granted his liberation 4 days later.

A welterweight bout between Chad Laprise and Li Jingliang was expected to take place at the event. However, Laprise pulled out of the fight on November 16 citing an undisclosed injury. As a result, Li was pulled from the card entirely and will be rescheduled at a future event.

At the weigh-ins, Pettis came in at 148 lb, three pounds over the featherweight limit of 145 lb. for a championship fight. As a result, in the event that Pettis were to win the fight with Holloway, he would be ineligible for the championship, while Holloway was still eligible. Pettis was fined 20% of his purse, which will go Holloway and the bout proceeded as scheduled at a catchweight. Pettis was the first fighter to miss weight for a UFC championship bout since Travis Lutter at UFC 67 in February 2007. Rustam Khabilov and Valérie Létourneau also missed the required weight for their respective fights. They were both fined 20% of their purse which will go to their respective opponents, Jason Saggo and Viviane Pereira. The bouts proceeded at catchweight.

== Results ==
Main Card
Weight class				Method	Round	Time	Notes
Catchweight (148 lb)	Max Holloway	def.	Anthony Pettis	TKO (body kick and punches)	3	4:50	(Note: For the interim UFC Featherweight Championship (only Holloway was eligible).)
Welterweight	Donald Cerrone	def.	Matt Brown	KO (Head Kick)	3	0:34
Featherweight	Cub Swanson	def.	Choi Doo-ho	Decision (unanimous) (30–27, 30–27, 29–28)	3	5:00
Middleweight	Kelvin Gastelum	def.	Tim Kennedy	TKO (punches)	3	2:45
Welterweight	Emil Weber Meek	def.	Jordan Mein	Decision (unanimous) (29–28, 29–28, 29–28)	3	5:00
Preliminary Card (Fox Sports 1)
Light Heavyweight	Misha Cirkunov	def.	Nikita Krylov	Submission (guillotine choke)	1	4:38
Lightweight	Olivier Aubin-Mercier	def.	Drew Dober	Submission (rear-naked choke)	2	2:57
Catchweight (117.5 lb)	Viviane Pereira	def.	Valérie Létourneau	Decision (split) (29–28, 28–29, 29–28)	3	5:00
Bantamweight	Matthew Lopez	def.	Mitch Gagnon	Decision (unanimous) (29–28, 29–28, 29–27)	3	5:00
Preliminary Card (UFC Fight Pass)
Lightweight	Lando Vannata	def.	John Makdessi	KO (wheel kick)	1	1:40
Catchweight (158 lb)	Rustam Khabilov	def.	Jason Saggo	Decision (unanimous) (30–27, 30–27, 30–27)	3	5:00
Flyweight	Dustin Ortiz	def.	Zach Makovsky	Decision (split) (29–28, 28–29, 29–28)	3	5:00

== Bonus awards ==
The following fighters were awarded $50,000 bonuses:

- Fight of the Night: Cub Swanson vs. Doo Ho Choi
- Performance of the Night: Max Holloway and Lando Vannata

== Swanson vs. Choi ==
After receiving fight of the year in 2016 it was announced by the UFC on April 10, 2022 that Cub Swanson vs. Doo Ho Choi would be inducted into the UFC Hall of Fame in 2022.

== See also ==
- List of UFC events
- 2016 in UFC
