= UFC Fight Night: Edgar vs. Faber =

UFC mixed martial arts event in 2015

- The poster for UFC Fight Night: Edgar vs. Faber
- Promotion: Ultimate Fighting Championship
- Date: May 16, 2015
- Venue: Mall of Asia Arena
- City: Pasay, Philippines
- Attendance: 13,446

Event chronology
UFC Fight Night: Miocic vs. Hunt	UFC Fight Night: Edgar vs. Faber	UFC 187: Johnson vs. Cormier

UFC Fight Night: Edgar vs. Faber (also known as UFC Fight Night 66) was a mixed martial arts event held on May 16, 2015, at the Mall of Asia Arena in Pasay, Philippines.

== Background ==
The event was the first that the organization has hosted in the Philippines. It took place in the metropolitan region of Manila, more precisely in Pasay.

The event was headlined by a featherweight bout between former UFC Lightweight Champion Frankie Edgar and former WEC Featherweight Champion Urijah Faber.

Luke Barnatt was expected to face Clint Hester at UFC Fight Night 63. However, Hester pulled out of the fight in early March due to a broken foot. Subsequently, Barnatt was pulled from the card entirely in favor of a matchup with Mark Muñoz at this event.

Roger Zapata was expected to face Li Jingliang at the event. However, on April 18, it was announced that Zapata was pulled from the fight due to undisclosed reasons. Jingliang faced Dhiego Lima.

Alex White was expected to face Mark Eddiva at the event. However, on April 26, it was announced that White was forced out of the fight due to an undisclosed injury. Eddiva faced promotional newcomer Levan Makashvili.

Royston Wee missed weight on his first attempt at the weigh ins, coming in at 137 lb and made no attempts to cut further. Instead, he was fined 20 percent of his fight purse, which went to Ning Guangyou.

== Results ==
Main Card (Fox Sports 1)
Weight class				Method	Round	Time	Notes
Featherweight	Frankie Edgar	def.	Urijah Faber	Decision (unanimous) (50–45, 50–45, 50–45)	5	5:00
Middleweight	Gegard Mousasi	def.	Costas Philippou	Decision (unanimous) (30–27, 30–27, 30–27)	3	5:00
Middleweight	Mark Muñoz	def.	Luke Barnatt	Decision (unanimous) (29–28, 30–27, 30–27)	3	5:00
Welterweight	Neil Magny	def.	Lim Hyun-gyu	TKO (punches)	2	1:24
Featherweight	Phillipe Nover	def.	Yui Chul Nam	Decision (split) (28–29, 29–28, 29–28)	3	5:00
Featherweight	Levan Makashvili	def.	Mark Eddiva	Decision (split) (29–28, 28–29, 30–27)	3	5:00
Preliminary Card (Fox Sports 1)
Lightweight	Jon Tuck	def.	Tae Hyun Bang	Submission (rear-naked choke)	1	3:56
Lightweight	Kajan Johnson	def.	Zhang Lipeng	Decision (unanimous) (30–27, 29–28, 29–28)	3	5:00
Welterweight	Li Jingliang	def.	Dhiego Lima	KO (punches)	1	1:25
Catchweight (137 lb)	Ning Guangyou	def.	Royston Wee	TKO (punches and elbows)	2	4:59
Preliminary Card (UFC Fight Pass)
Flyweight	Jon Delos Reyes	def.	Roldan Sangcha-an	Submission (rear-naked choke)	2	3:13
Flyweight	Yao Zhikui	def.	Nolan Ticman	Decision (split) (29–28, 28–29, 29–28)	3	5:00

== Bonus awards ==
The following fighters were awarded $50,000 bonuses:

- Fight of the Night: Jon Delos Reyes vs. Roldan Sangcha-An
- Performance of the Night: Neil Magny and Jon Tuck

== See also ==
- List of UFC events
- 2015 in UFC
