= 2017 in UFC =

Mixed martial arts events

Information
- First date: January 15
- Last date: December 30

Events
- Total events: 39
- UFC: 12
- UFC on Fox: 4
- TUF Finale events: 2

Fights
- Total fights: 457
- Title fights: 20

Chronology
2016 in UFC	2017 in UFC	2018 in UFC

The year 2017 was the 25th year in the history of the Ultimate Fighting Championship (UFC), a mixed martial arts promotion based in the United States.

== 2017 in UFC ==
=== Dana White's Contender Series ===
In May 2017, the UFC announced White would hold Dana White's Contender Series weekly on UFC Fight Pass. As with the earlier web series Looking for a Fight, the goal of the series is for White to scout talent for the UFC. Similar to The Ultimate Fighter none of the fighters involved will have existing UFC contracts. Licensed separately from the UFC with Dana White applying for a promoter's licence, it was stated ahead of the license being approved that “this is not the UFC, this is not the UFC brand, but instead a promotion that will allow up and coming fighters the chance to showcase their talents in hopes that one day they may compete in the UFC."

The inaugural event took take place on July 11, 2017 at the UFC's home base of Las Vegas.

== 2017 UFC.com awards ==
2017 UFC.COM Awards
No	Best Fighter	The Upsets	The Submissions	The Newcomers	The Knockouts	The Fights
1	Max Holloway	Rose Namajunas defeats Joanna Jędrzejczyk 1 UFC 217	Demetrious Johnson defeats Ray Borg; UFC 216	Volkan Oezdemir	Francis Ngannou defeats Alistair Overeem; UFC 218	Justin Gaethje defeats Michael Johnson; The Ultimate Fighter: Redemption Finale
2	Rose Namajunas	Josh Emmett defeats Ricardo Lamas; UFC on Fox: Lawler vs. dos Anjos	Aleksei Oleinik defeats Viktor Pešta; UFC Fight Night: Rodríguez vs. Penn	Cynthia Calvillo	Mike Perry defeats Jake Ellenberger; UFC Fight Night: Swanson vs. Lobov	Eddie Alvarez defeats Justin Gaethje; UFC 218
3	Demetrious Johnson	Dan Kelly defeats Rashad Evans; UFC 209	Brett Johns defeats Joe Soto; The Ultimate Fighter: A New World Champion Finale	Justin Gaethje	Edson Barboza defeats Beneil Dariush; UFC Fight Night: Belfort vs. Gastelum	Yancy Medeiros defeats Alex Oliveira; UFC 218
4	Robert Whittaker	Eryk Anders defeats Rafael Natal; UFC on Fox: Weidman vs. Gastelum	Brian Ortega defeats Cub Swanson; UFC Fight Night: Swanson vs. Ortega	Marlon Moraes	Matt Brown defeats Diego Sanchez; UFC Fight Night: Poirier vs. Pettis	Dustin Poirier defeats Anthony Pettis; UFC Fight Night: Poirier vs. Pettis
5	Cris Cyborg	Darren Elkins defeats Mirsad Bektić; UFC 209	Valentina Shevchenko defeats Julianna Peña; UFC on Fox: Shevchenko vs. Peña	Zabit Magomedsharipov	Marlon Moraes defeats Aljamain Sterling; UFC Fight Night: Swanson vs. Ortega	Frank Camacho defeats Damien Brown; UFC Fight Night: Werdum vs. Tybura
6	Volkan Oezdemir	Gabriel Benítez defeats Jason Knight; UFC 209	Iuri Alcântara defeats Luke Sanders; UFC Fight Night: Swanson vs. Ortega	Nicco Montaño	Ricardo Ramos defeats Aiemann Zahabi; UFC 217	Tim Elliott defeats Louis Smolka; UFC on Fox: Johnson vs. Reis
7	Rafael dos Anjos	Brian Kelleher defeats Iuri Alcântara; UFC 212	Ovince Saint Preux defeats Yushin Okami; UFC Fight Night: Saint Preux vs. Okami	Paulo Costa	Holly Holm defeats Bethe Correia; UFC Fight Night: Holm vs. Correia	David Teymur defeats Lando Vannata; UFC 209
8	Dustin Poirier	Felice Herrig defeats Alexa Grasso; UFC Fight Night: Bermudez vs. The Korean Zombie	Demetrious Johnson defeats Wilson Reis; UFC on Fox: Johnson vs. Reis	Eryk Anders	Marc Diakiese defeats Teemu Packalén; UFC Fight Night: Manuwa vs. Anderson	Jéssica Andrade defeats Angela Hill; UFC Fight Night: Bermudez vs. The Korean Zombie
9	Raphael Assunção	Carla Esparza defeats Cynthia Calvillo; UFC 219	Georges St-Pierre defeats Michael Bisping; UFC 217	Dominick Reyes	Damir Hadžović defeats Marcin Held; UFC Fight Night: Gustafsson vs. Teixeira	Georges St-Pierre defeats Michael Bisping; UFC 217
10	Brian Ortega	Georges St-Pierre defeats Michael Bisping; UFC 217	Zabit Magomedsharipov defeats Sheymon Moraes; UFC Fight Night: Bisping vs. Gastelum	Trevin Giles	Kelvin Gastelum defeats Michael Bisping; UFC Fight Night: Bisping vs. Gastelum	Julian Marquez defeats Darren Stewart; UFC on Fox: Lawler vs. dos Anjos
Ref						

== 2017 by the numbers ==
The numbers below records the events, fights, techniques, champions and fighters held or performed for the year of 2017 in UFC.

Events
Number of Events	PPV	Continents	Countries	Cities	Fight Night Bonuses
39	13	5	14	34	156; Total $7,800,000
Longest Event	Shortest Event	Highest Income Live Gate	Lowest Income Live Gate	Highest Attendance	Lowest Attendance
UFC Fight Night: Werdum vs. Tybura 3:04:18	UFC Fight Night: Rockhold vs. Branch 1:20:40	UFC 217 $6,200,000	The Ultimate Fighter 26 Finale $124,847.40	UFC 217 18,201	The Ultimate Fighter 26 Finale 2,798
Title Fights
Undisputed Title Fights	Title Changes	Champions Remained in Their Divisions	Number of Champions	Number of Interim Champions	Number of Title Defenses
18	4	6 FLW – Demetrious Johnson; LW – Conor McGregor; WW – Tyron Woodley; LHW – Daniel Cormier; HW – Stipe Miocic; WBW – Amanda Nunes	13	2	11
Champions
Division	Beginning of The Year	End of The Year	Division	Beginning of The Year	End of The Year
Heavyweight	Stipe Miocic	Stipe Miocic	Bantamweight	Cody Garbrandt	T.J. Dillashaw
Light Heavyweight	Daniel Cormier	Daniel Cormier	Flyweight	Demetrious Johnson	Demetrious Johnson
Middleweight	Michael Bisping	Robert Whittaker	Women's Bantamweight	Amanda Nunes	Amanda Nunes
Welterweight	Tyron Woodley	Tyron Woodley	Women's Flyweight	None	Nicco Montaño
Lightweight	Conor McGregor	Conor McGregor	Women's Strawweight	Joanna Jędrzejczyk	Rose Namajunas
Featherweight	José Aldo	Max Holloway	Women's Featherweight	None	Cris Cyborg
Fights
Most Knockouts at A Single Event	Most submissions at A Single Event	Most Decisions at A Single Event	Total Number of Fights	Total Number of Cage Time	
UFC 218 8	UFC on Fox: Shevchenko vs. Peña; UFC 212; UFC 216; UFC Fight Night: Brunson vs. Machida; UFC Fight Night: Bisping vs. Gastelum; The Ultimate Fighter 26 Finale 4	UFC Fight Night: Werdum vs. Tybura 10	457	83:36:56	
Fighters
Number of Fighters	UFC Debutants	Releases / Retired	Fighters Suspended	Number of Fighters Missed weight	
(At the end of Dec 31, 2017); 565	116	N/A	N/A	28	
Champion feats
Germaine de Randamie became the inaugural women's featherweight champion.; Robert Whittaker became the first New Zealand-born champion.; The 86 total strikes landed by Tyron Woodley and Demian Maia were the fewest ever in a five‑round UFC welterweight title fight.; Demetrious Johnson set the UFC record for most consecutive title defenses by securing his eleventh straight at UFC 216.; Nicco Montaño became the inaugural women's flyweight champion.
Fighter feats
Aleksei Oleinik became the first fighter to win via an Ezekiel choke submission.; Derek Brunson set the UFC middleweight record for most first‑round finishes by earning his seventh at UFC Fight Night 119.; Holly Holm became the first female to win two bouts via head kick knockout.; Dustin Ortiz's 15-second knockout at UFC Fight Night 114 stands as the fastest finish and fastest knockout in UFC flyweight history.; Andre Soukhamthath became the first fighter to lose a decision despite scoring three knockdowns, a result that occurred at UFC Fight Night 114.; Mairbek Taisumov became the first lightweight to score five consecutive knockout victories.; Josh Emmett's four knockdowns at UFC Fight Night 118 set the record for the most in a UFC featherweight bout.; Francis Ngannou became the first heavyweight fighter to score six consecutive finishes.; Max Holloway became the youngest fighter in UFC history to reach 15 wins, accomplishing the feat at age 25.

== Debut UFC fighters ==
The following fighters fought their first UFC fight in 2017:

ISO	Fighter	Division
(Russia)	Abdul-Kerim Edilov	Light Heavyweight
(Poland)	Adam Wieczorek	Heavyweight
(Canada)	Aiemann Zahabi	Bantamweight
(Serbia)	Aleksandar Rakić	Light Heavyweight
(United States)	Alex Perez	Flyweight
(United States)	Alex Reyes	Lightweight
(Brazil)	Alexandre Pantoja	Flyweight
(United States)	Allen Crowder	Heavyweight
(Brazil)	Amanda Lemos	Women's Bantamweight
(United States)	Andre Soukhamthath	Bantamweight
(United States)	Ariel Beck	Women's Flyweight
(Canada)	Arjan Bhullar	Heavyweight
(Australia)	Ashkan Mokhtarian	Flyweight
(United States)	Barb Honchak	Women's Flyweight
(United States)	Benito Lopez	Bantamweight
(India)	Bharat Kandare	Featherweight
(United States)	Bobby Nash	Welterweight
(United States)	Brian Kelleher	Bantamweight
(United States)	Calvin Kattar	Featherweight
(Philippines)	Carls John de Tomas	Flyweight
(South Korea)	Chan-Mi Jeon	Women's Strawweight
(United States)	Christina Marks	Women's Flyweight
(Belgium)	Cindy Dandois	Women's Bantamweight
(United States)	Cody Stamann	Bantamweight
(United States)	Cynthia Calvillo	Women's Strawweight
(United States)	Daniel Spitz	Heavyweight
(Sweden)	Daniel Teymur	Featherweight
(Scotland)	Danny Henry	Featherweight
(Brazil)	Davi Ramos	Lightweight
(United States)	DeAnna Bennett	Women's Flyweight
(Brazil)	Deiveson Figueiredo	Flyweight
(United States)	Desmond Green	Lightweight
(United States)	Devin Powell	Lightweight
(United States)	Dominick Reyes	Light Heavyweight
(United States)	Drakkar Klose	Lightweight
(United States)	Emily Whitmire	Women's Strawweight
(United States)	Eryk Anders	Middleweight
(United States)	Eric Shelton	Flyweight
(Guam)	Frank Camacho	Welterweight
(United Kingdom)	Galore Bofando	Welterweight

ISO	Fighter	Division
(Canada)	Gavin Tucker	Featherweight
(Canada)	Gillian Robertson	Women's Flyweight
(United States)	Gina Mazany	Women's Bantamweight
(Turkey)	Gökhan Saki	Light Heavyweight
(China)	Hu Yaozong	Light Heavyweight
(Peru)	Humberto Bandenay	Featherweight
(United States)	James Bochnovic	Light Heavyweight
(United States)	Jared Gordon	Lightweight
(United States)	Jeremy Kimball	Light Heavyweight
(Australia)	Jessica Rose-Clark	Women's Flyweight
(South Korea)	Ji Yeon Kim	Women's Flyweight
(United States)	Jodie Esquibel	Women's Strawweight
(United States)	Joseph Morales	Flyweight
(United States)	Julian Marquez	Middleweight
(Brazil)	Júnior Albini	Heavyweight
(United States)	Justin Gaethje	Lightweight
(United States)	Justin Willis	Heavyweight
(Brazil)	Kalindra Faria	Women's Flyweight
(Armenia)	Karine Gevorgyan	Women's Flyweight
(United States)	Karl Roberson	Middleweight
(Czech Republic)	Lucie Pudilova	Women's Bantamweight
(New Zealand)	Luke Jumeau	Welterweight
(Denmark)	Mads Burnell	Featherweight
(Russia)	Magomed Bibulatov	Flyweight
(Italy)	Mara Romero Borella	Women's Flyweight
(Brazil)	Marcel Fortuna	Heavyweight
(Brazil)	Marcelo Golm	Heavyweight
(United States)	Mark De La Rosa	Bantamweight
(Brazil)	Markus Perez	Middleweight
(Poland)	Michał Oleksiejczuk	Light Heavyweight
(Hungary)	Melinda Fábián	Women's Strawweight
(Georgia (country))	Merab Dvalishvili	Bantamweight
(United States)	Michel Quiñones	Featherweight
(United States)	Mike Santiago	Featherweight
(United States)	Montana De La Rosa	Women's Flyweight
(Russia)	Muslim Salikhov	Welterweight
(Australia)	Nadia Kassem	Women's Strawweight

ISO	Fighter	Division
(Japan)	Naoki Inoue	Flyweight
(Afghanistan)	Nasrat Haqparast	Lightweight
(United States)	Nicco Montaño	Women's Flyweight
(United States)	Nick Roehrick	Light Heavyweight
(Sweden)	Oliver Enkamp	Welterweight
(Poland)	Oskar Piechota	Middleweight
(Brazil)	Paulo Costa	Middleweight
(United States)	Pearl Gonzalez	Women's Strawweight
(Brazil)	Poliana Botelho	Women's Strawweight
(United States)	Rashad Coulter	Heavyweight
(United States)	Rachael Ostovich	Women's Flyweight
(Russia)	Ramazan Emeev	Welterweight
(Brazil)	Ricardo Ramos	Bantamweight
(Australia)	Rob Wilkinson	Middleweight
(United States)	Roberto Sanchez	Flyweight
(Philippines)	Rolando Dy	Featherweight
(United States)	Terrion Ware	Bantamweight
(United States)	Trevin Giles	Middleweight
(Poland)	Salim Touahri	Welterweight
(United States)	Sean O'Malley	Bantamweight
(United States)	Shana Dobson	Women's Flyweight
(New Zealand)	Shane Young	Featherweight
(Brazil)	Sheymon Moraes	Featherweight
(China)	Song Kenan	Welterweight
(China)	Song Yadong	Bantamweight
(Japan)	Syuri Kondo	Women's Strawweight
(Australia)	Tai Tuivasa	Heavyweight
(Brazil)	Talita Bernardo	Women's Bantamweight
(France)	Tom Duquesnoy	Bantamweight
(United States)	Tom Gallicchio	Lightweight
(Switzerland)	Volkan Oezdemir	Light Heavyweight
(China)	Wang Guan	Featherweight
(China)	Wu Yunan	Women's Bantamweight
(China)	Wuliji Buren	Bantamweight
(China)	Yan Xiaonan	Women's Strawweight
(Russia)	Zabit Magomedsharipov	Featherweight
(United States)	Zu Anyanwu	Heavyweight

== The Ultimate Fighter ==
The following The Ultimate Fighter seasons are scheduled for broadcast in 2017:

Season	Finale	Division	Winner	Runner-up
TUF 25: Redemption	July 7, 2017	Welterweight	Jesse Taylor	Dhiego Lima
TUF 26: A New World Champion	December 1, 2017	Women's Flyweight	Nicco Montaño	Roxanne Modafferi

== Title fights ==
Title fights in 2017
Weight class				Method	Round	Time	Event	Notes
Women's Featherweight	Germaine de Randamie	def.	Holly Holm	Decision (unanimous) (48–47, 48–47, 48–47)	5	5:00	UFC 208	(Note: For the inaugural UFC Women's Featherweight Championship.)
Welterweight	Tyron Woodley (c)	def.	Stephen Thompson	Decision (majority) (48–47, 47–47, 48–47)	5	5:00	UFC 209	(Note: For the UFC Welterweight Championship.)
Light Heavyweight	Daniel Cormier (c)	def.	Anthony Johnson	Submission (rear-naked choke)	2	3:39	UFC 210	(Note: For the UFC Light Heavyweight Championship.)
Flyweight	Demetrious Johnson (c)	def.	Wilson Reis	Submission (armbar)	3	4:49	UFC on Fox 24	(Note: For the UFC Flyweight Championship.)
Women's Strawweight	Joanna Jędrzejczyk (c)	def.	Jéssica Andrade	Decision (unanimous) (50–45, 50–44, 50–45)	5	5:00	UFC 211	(Note: For the UFC Women's Strawweight Championship.)
Heavyweight	Stipe Miocic (c)	def.	Junior dos Santos	TKO (punches)	1	2:22	UFC 211	(Note: For the UFC Heavyweight Championship.)
Featherweight	Max Holloway (ic)	def.	José Aldo (c)	TKO (punches)	3	4:13	UFC 212	(Note: For the UFC Featherweight Championship.)
Middleweight	Robert Whittaker	def.	Yoel Romero	Decision (unanimous) (48–47, 48–47, 48–47)	5	5:00	UFC 213	(Note: For the interim UFC Middleweight Championship.)
Women's Featherweight	Cris Cyborg	def.	Tonya Evinger	TKO (knees)	3	1:56	UFC 214	(Note: For the vacant UFC Women's Featherweight Championship.)
Welterweight	Tyron Woodley (c)	def.	Demian Maia	Decision (unanimous) (50–45, 49–46, 49–46)	5	5:00	UFC 214	(Note: For the UFC Welterweight Championship.)
Light Heavyweight	Daniel Cormier (c)	vs.	Jon Jones	No Contest (overturned)	3	3:01	UFC 214	(Note: For the UFC Light Heavyweight Championship. Originally a KO (head kick and punches) win for Jones, overturned after he tested positive for turinabol.)
Women's Bantamweight	Amanda Nunes (c)	def.	Valentina Shevchenko	Decision (split) (47–48, 48–47, 48–47)	5	5:00	UFC 215	(Note: For the UFC Women's Bantamweight Championship.)
Flyweight	Demetrious Johnson (c)	def.	Ray Borg	Submission (armbar)	5	3:15	UFC 216	(Note: For the UFC Flyweight Championship.)
Lightweight	Tony Ferguson	def.	Kevin Lee	Submission (triangle choke)	3	4:02	UFC 216	(Note: For the interim UFC Lightweight Championship.)
Women's Strawweight	Rose Namajunas	def.	Joanna Jędrzejczyk (c)	TKO (punches)	1	3:03	UFC 217	(Note: For the UFC Women's Strawweight Championship.)
Bantamweight	T.J. Dillashaw	def.	Cody Garbrandt (c)	KO (punches)	2	2:41	UFC 217	(Note: For the UFC Bantamweight Championship.)
Middleweight	Georges St-Pierre	def.	Michael Bisping (c)	Technical Submission (rear-naked choke)	3	4:23	UFC 217	(Note: For the UFC Middleweight Championship.)
Women's Flyweight	Nicco Montaño	def.	Roxanne Modafferi	Decision (unanimous) (50–45, 49–46, 49–46)	5	5:00	The Ultimate Fighter: A New World Champion Finale	(Note: For the inaugural UFC Women's Flyweight Championship.)
Featherweight	Max Holloway (c)	def.	José Aldo	TKO (punches)	3	4:51	UFC 218	(Note: For the UFC Featherweight Championship.)
Women's Featherweight	Cris Cyborg (c)	def.	Holly Holm	Decision (unanimous) (49–46, 48–47, 48–47)	5	5:00	UFC 219	(Note: For the UFC Women’s Featherweight Championship.)

== Events list ==
#	Event	Date	Venue	Location	Attendance
424	UFC 219: Cyborg vs. Holm	December 30, 2017	T-Mobile Arena	Las Vegas, Nevada, U.S.	13,561
423	UFC on Fox: Lawler vs. dos Anjos	December 16, 2017	Bell MTS Place	Winnipeg, Manitoba, Canada	8,862
422	UFC Fight Night: Swanson vs. Ortega	December 9, 2017	Save Mart Center	Fresno, California, U.S	7,605
421	UFC 218: Holloway vs. Aldo 2	December 2, 2017	Little Caesars Arena	Detroit, Michigan, U.S.	17,587
420	The Ultimate Fighter: A New World Champion Finale	December 1, 2017	Park Theatre	Las Vegas, Nevada, U.S.	—N/a
419	UFC Fight Night: Bisping vs. Gastelum	November 25, 2017	Mercedes-Benz Arena	Shanghai, China	15,128
418	UFC Fight Night: Werdum vs. Tybura	November 19, 2017	Qudos Bank Arena	Sydney, New South Wales, Australia	10,021
417	UFC Fight Night: Poirier vs. Pettis	November 11, 2017	Ted Constant Convocation Center	Norfolk, Virginia, U.S.	8,442
416	UFC 217: Bisping vs. St-Pierre	November 4, 2017	Madison Square Garden	New York City, New York, U.S.	18,201
415	UFC Fight Night: Machida vs. Brunson	October 28, 2017	Ginásio do Ibirapuera	São Paulo, Brazil	10,265
414	UFC Fight Night: Cowboy vs. Till	October 21, 2017	Ergo Arena	Gdańsk, Poland	11,138
413	UFC 216: Ferguson vs. Lee	October 7, 2017	T-Mobile Arena	Las Vegas, Nevada, U.S.	10,638
412	UFC Fight Night: Shogun vs. Saint Preux 2	September 23, 2017	Saitama Super Arena	Saitama, Saitama, Japan	8,571
411	UFC Fight Night: Rockhold vs. Branch	September 16, 2017	PPG Paints Arena	Pittsburgh, Pennsylvania, U.S.	7,005
410	UFC 215: Nunes vs. Shevchenko 2	September 9, 2017	Rogers Place	Edmonton, Alberta, Canada	16,232
409	UFC Fight Night: Volkov vs. Struve	September 2, 2017	Rotterdam Ahoy	Rotterdam, Netherlands	10,224
408	UFC Fight Night: Pettis vs. Moreno	August 5, 2017	Arena Ciudad de México	Mexico City, Mexico	10,172
407	UFC 214: Cormier vs. Jones 2	July 29, 2017	Honda Center	Anaheim, California, U.S.	16,610
406	UFC on Fox: Weidman vs. Gastelum	July 22, 2017	Nassau Veterans Memorial Coliseum	Uniondale, New York, U.S.	11,198
405	UFC Fight Night: Nelson vs. Ponzinibbio	July 16, 2017	SSE Hydro	Glasgow, Scotland	10,589
404	UFC 213: Romero vs. Whittaker	July 8, 2017	T-Mobile Arena	Las Vegas, Nevada, U.S	12,834
403	The Ultimate Fighter: Redemption Finale	July 7, 2017	T-Mobile Arena	Las Vegas, Nevada, U.S.	6,308
402	UFC Fight Night: Chiesa vs. Lee	June 25, 2017	Chesapeake Energy Arena	Oklahoma City, Oklahoma, U.S.	7,605
401	UFC Fight Night: Holm vs. Correia	June 17, 2017	Singapore Indoor Stadium	Kallang, Singapore	8,414
400	UFC Fight Night: Lewis vs. Hunt	June 11, 2017	Spark Arena	Auckland, New Zealand	8,649
399	UFC 212: Aldo vs. Holloway	June 3, 2017	Jeunesse Arena	Rio de Janeiro, Brazil	15,412
398	UFC Fight Night: Gustafsson vs. Teixeira	May 28, 2017	Ericsson Globe	Stockholm, Sweden	12,668
397	UFC 211: Miocic vs dos Santos 2	May 13, 2017	American Airlines Center	Dallas, Texas, U.S.	17,834
396	UFC Fight Night: Swanson vs. Lobov	April 22, 2017	Bridgestone Arena	Nashville, Tennessee, U.S.	10,744
395	UFC on Fox: Johnson vs. Reis	April 15, 2017	Sprint Center	Kansas City, Missouri, U.S.	12,171
394	UFC 210: Cormier vs Johnson 2	April 8, 2017	KeyBank Center	Buffalo, New York, U.S.	17,110
393	UFC Fight Night: Manuwa vs. Anderson	March 18, 2017	The O_{2} Arena	London, England, U.K.	15,761
392	UFC Fight Night: Belfort vs. Gastelum	March 11, 2017	Centro de Formação Olímpica do Nordeste	Fortaleza, Brazil	14,069
391	UFC 209: Woodley vs. Thompson 2	March 4, 2017	T-Mobile Arena	Las Vegas, Nevada, U.S.	13,150
390	UFC Fight Night: Lewis vs. Browne	February 19, 2017	Scotiabank Centre	Halifax, Nova Scotia, Canada	8,123
389	UFC 208: Holm vs De Randamie	February 11, 2017	Barclays Center	Brooklyn, New York, U.S.	15,628
388	UFC Fight Night: Bermudez vs. The Korean Zombie	February 4, 2017	Toyota Center	Houston, Texas, U.S.	8,119
387	UFC on Fox: Shevchenko vs. Peña	January 28, 2017	Pepsi Center	Denver, Colorado, U.S	13,233
386	UFC Fight Night: Rodríguez vs. Penn	January 15, 2017	Talking Stick Resort Arena	Phoenix, Arizona, U.S	11,589

== See also ==
- UFC
- List of UFC champions
- List of UFC events
- List of current UFC fighters
- Floyd Mayweather Jr. vs. Conor McGregor
