= UFC 217 =

UFC mixed martial arts event in 2017

UFC 217: Bisping vs. St-Pierre
- The poster for UFC 217: Bisping vs. St-Pierre
- Promotion: Ultimate Fighting Championship
- Date: November 4, 2017
- Venue: Madison Square Garden
- City: New York City, New York
- Attendance: 18,201
- Total gate: $6,200,000
- Buyrate: 875,000

Event chronology
UFC Fight Night: Brunson vs. Machida	UFC 217: Bisping vs. St-Pierre	UFC Fight Night: Poirier vs. Pettis

UFC 217: Bisping vs. St-Pierre was a mixed martial arts event produced by the Ultimate Fighting Championship held on November 4, 2017, at Madison Square Garden in New York City, New York.

== Background ==
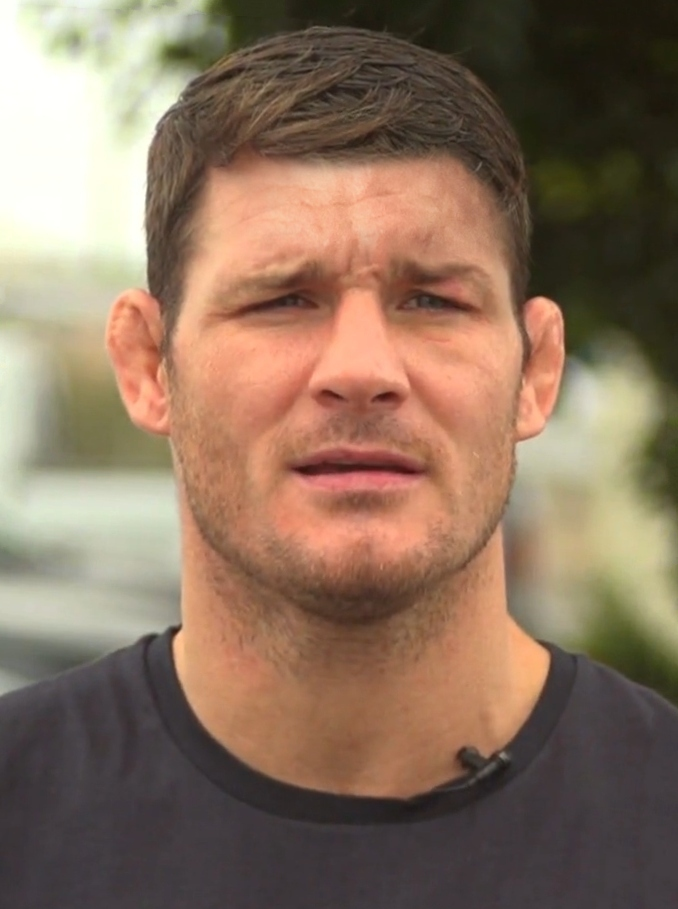
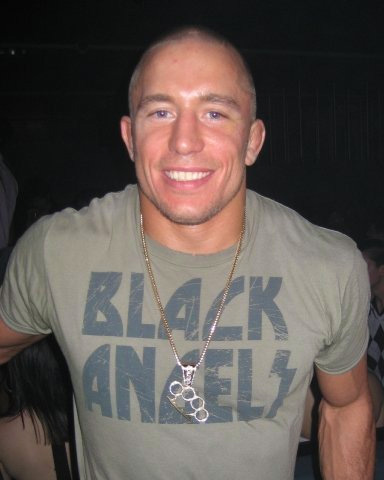
St-Pierre (right) fought for the first time in four years, as he tried to become the fourth fighter to win titles in different weight classes in the UFC. Meanwhile, Michael Bisping (left) had his 2nd title defense since he became the champion at UFC 199 in June 2016.

The event was the second that the promotion has hosted at Madison Square Garden.

A UFC Middleweight Championship bout between current champion and The Ultimate Fighter 3 light heavyweight winner Michael Bisping and former two-time UFC Welterweight Champion Georges St-Pierre headlined this event. The bout was originally announced in March, but without a date attached. As time wore on the contest appeared to fall apart, with UFC President Dana White claiming Bisping would fight interim middleweight champion Robert Whittaker next and St-Pierre would get current welterweight champion Tyron Woodley. When Whittaker announced he was injured and Woodley put on a successful title defense against Demian Maia at UFC 214 in July that didn't meet White's standards, he reverted to the initial plan, which St-Pierre and Bisping said they wanted all along.

A UFC Bantamweight Championship bout between champion Cody Garbrandt and former champion T.J. Dillashaw, was previously scheduled to serve as headliner for UFC 213. However, Garbrandt withdrew from the fight due to a back injury. The fight was later rescheduled for this event.

A UFC Women's Strawweight Championship bout between champion Joanna Jędrzejczyk and former title challenger Rose Namajunas took place as the third title fight of the event.

Gadzhimurad Antigulov was expected to face Ion Cuțelaba at the event. However, Antigulov pulled out of the fight on September 26 citing an injury. He was replaced by promotional newcomer Michał Oleksiejczuk. In turn after the weigh-ins, Cuțelaba was pulled from the event by USADA due to a potential Anti-Doping Policy violation stemming from its investigation into voluntary disclosures by Cuțelaba during an out-of-competition sample collections on October 18 and October 19. He was provisionally suspended and the bout cancelled.

A heavyweight bout between Walt Harris and Mark Godbeer was initially slated for UFC 216. However, the fight was scrapped on the day of the event as Harris, was tabbed replacement opponent for Fabrício Werdum after his scheduled opponent Derrick Lewis pulled out of their fight with a back injury. The Harris/Godbeer pairing was rescheduled and took place at this event.

Patrick Cummins was expected to face The Ultimate Fighter: Team Edgar vs. Team Penn light heavyweight winner Corey Anderson at this event. However, on October 17, Cummins pulled out due to a resistant staph infection. He was replaced by former interim UFC Light Heavyweight Championship challenger Ovince Saint Preux.

== Results ==
Main Card
Weight class				Method	Round	Time	Notes
Middleweight	Georges St-Pierre	def.	Michael Bisping (c)	Technical Submission (rear-naked choke)	3	4:23	(Note: For the UFC Middleweight Championship.)
Bantamweight	T.J. Dillashaw	def.	Cody Garbrandt (c)	TKO (punches)	2	2:41	(Note: For the UFC Bantamweight Championship.)
Women's Strawweight	Rose Namajunas	def.	Joanna Jędrzejczyk (c)	TKO (punches)	1	3:03	(Note: For the UFC Women's Strawweight Championship.)
Welterweight	Stephen Thompson	def.	Jorge Masvidal	Decision (unanimous) (30–26, 30–27, 30–27)	3	5:00
Middleweight	Paulo Costa	def.	Johny Hendricks	TKO (punches)	2	1:23
Preliminary Card (Fox Sports 1)
Lightweight	James Vick	def.	Joseph Duffy	TKO (punches)	2	4:59
Heavyweight	Mark Godbeer	def.	Walt Harris	DQ (illegal head kick)	1	4:29	(Note: Harris was disqualified for hitting Godbeer with a head kick after the referee called a time out due to a groin strike.)
Light Heavyweight	Ovince Saint Preux	def.	Corey Anderson	KO (head kick)	3	1:25
Welterweight	Randy Brown	def.	Mickey Gall	Decision (unanimous) (29–28, 29–28, 29–27)	3	5:00
Preliminary Card (UFC Fight Pass)
Heavyweight	Curtis Blaydes	def.	Alexey Oleynik	TKO (doctor stoppage)	2	1:56	(Note: The referee stopped the fight after Blaydes delivered an illegal kick to a downed opponent and called a doctor to check on Oleinik. The fight was stopped due to the doctor's advice. The replay, however, showed the strike did not deliver significant damage (as it only grazed the ear), and the fight was ruled a TKO win for Blaydes.)
Bantamweight	Ricardo Ramos	def.	Aiemann Zahabi	KO (spinning back elbow)	3	1:58

== Bonus awards ==
The following fighters were awarded bonuses:

- Fight of the Night: None awarded
- Performance of the Night ($50,000): Georges St-Pierre, T.J. Dillashaw and Rose Namajunas
- Performance of the Night ($25,000): Ovince Saint Preux and Ricardo Ramos

== Record set ==
Like UFC 33, UFC 205 and UFC 214, the card featured three title fights. However, this was the first time in UFC history that all three champions lost their belts on the same card.

== See also ==
- List of UFC events
- 2017 in UFC
- Mixed martial arts in New York
