= UFC on ESPN: Covington vs. Lawler =

UFC mixed martial arts event in 2019

- The poster for UFC on ESPN: Covington vs. Lawler
- Promotion: Ultimate Fighting Championship
- Date: August 3, 2019
- Venue: Prudential Center
- City: Newark, New Jersey
- Attendance: 10,427
- Total gate: $687,778

Event chronology
UFC 240: Holloway vs. Edgar	UFC on ESPN: Covington vs. Lawler	UFC Fight Night: Shevchenko vs. Carmouche 2

UFC on ESPN: Covington vs. Lawler (also known as UFC on ESPN 5) was a mixed martial arts event produced by the Ultimate Fighting Championship that took place on August 3, 2019, at the Prudential Center in Newark, New Jersey.

== Background ==
The event was initially linked to Sochi, Russia, which would have marked the promotion's first visit to the Black Sea region of Russia. However, the plans for a Sochi debut fizzled. Subsequently, after also briefly considering contesting the event in Manchester, as well as Tampa, Florida, the promotion announced plans to return to familiar surroundings of Northern New Jersey. The event marked the promotion's eighth visit to the Prudential Center and first since UFC on Fox: Johnson vs. Bader in January 2016.

A welterweight bout between former interim UFC Welterweight Champion Colby Covington and former undisputed champion Robbie Lawler served as the event headliner.

A welterweight bout between Cláudio Silva and Ramazan Emeev was rescheduled for the event. The matchup was originally scheduled to take place in September 2018 at UFC Fight Night: Hunt vs. Oleinik. However, Silva pulled out of the fight citing a lower back injury and was replaced by promotional newcomer Stefan Sekulić. In turn, Emeev was removed from this event due to alleged visa issues, that restricted his travel to the United States. He was replaced by promotional newcomer Cole Williams. At the weigh-ins, Williams weighed in at 176 pounds, 5 pounds over the welterweight non-title fight limit of 171. As a result, he was fined 30 percent of his purse and the bout proceeded at a catchweight.

A women's flyweight bout between former Invicta FC Bantamweight Champion Lauren Murphy and Mara Romero Borella was initially scheduled to take place at UFC 240. However, on June 20 promotion officials elected to reschedule the pairing to take place at this event.

A light heavyweight bout between Ilir Latifi and former UFC Light Heavyweight Championship challenger Volkan Oezdemir was originally scheduled to take place at UFC Fight Night: Gustafsson vs. Smith. However, Latifi was forced to pull out of the event due to a back injury and the bout was cancelled. The pair was initially rescheduled at this event. In turn, the bout was shifted a week later to UFC Fight Night: Shevchenko vs. Carmouche 2 after Oezdemir was faced with alleged visa issues which affected his travel schedule.

A welterweight bout between Zelim Imadaev and Salim Touahri was briefly targeted for this event. However, on July 9 it was announced that Touahri would face Mickey Gall instead. No reason was given for the change.

At the weigh-ins, Dong Hyun Ma weighed in at 158 pounds, 2 pounds over the lightweight non-title fight limit of 156. He was fined 20% of his purse and his bout with Scott Holtzman proceeded at a catchweight.

== Results ==
Main Card (ESPN)
Weight class				Method	Round	Time	Notes
Welterweight	Colby Covington	def.	Robbie Lawler	Decision (unanimous) (50–44, 50–45, 50–45)	5	5:00
Lightweight	Jim Miller	def.	Clay Guida	Technical Submission (guillotine choke)	1	0:58
Lightweight	Nasrat Haqparast	def.	Joaquim Silva	KO (punches)	2	0:36
Middleweight	Gerald Meerschaert	def.	Trevin Giles	Technical Submission (guillotine choke)	3	1:49
Catchweight (158 lb)	Scott Holtzman	def.	Dong Hyun Ma	TKO (doctor stoppage)	2	5:00
Light Heavyweight	Kennedy Nzechukwu	def.	Darko Stošić	Decision (unanimous) (29–26, 29–26, 28–27)	3	5:00	(Note: Stošić was deducted two points, one in round two and one in round three, both due to repeated groin strikes.)
Preliminary Card (ESPN)
Welterweight	Mickey Gall	def.	Salim Touahri	Decision (unanimous) (29–28, 29–28, 29–28)	3	5:00
Women's Flyweight	Antonina Shevchenko	def.	Lucie Pudilová	Technical Submission (rear-naked choke)	2	1:20
Flyweight	Matt Schnell	def.	Jordan Espinosa	Submission (triangle choke)	1	1:23
Women's Flyweight	Lauren Murphy	def.	Mara Romero Borella	TKO (knee and elbows)	3	1:46
Catchweight (176 lb)	Cláudio Silva	def.	Cole Williams	Submission (rear-naked choke)	1	2:35
Women's Flyweight	Miranda Granger	def.	Hannah Goldy	Decision (unanimous) (30–27, 30–27, 30–27)	3	5:00

== Bonus awards ==
The following fighters received $50,000 bonuses.

- Fight of the Night: Antonina Shevchenko vs. Lucie Pudilová
- Performance of the Night: Nasrat Haqparast and Matt Schnell

== See also ==
- List of UFC events
- 2019 in UFC
- List of current UFC fighters
