= UFC Fight Night: Brunson vs. Machida =

UFC mixed martial arts event in 2017

- The poster for UFC Fight Night: Brunson vs. Machida
- Promotion: Ultimate Fighting Championship
- Date: October 28, 2017
- Venue: Ginásio do Ibirapuera
- City: São Paulo, Brazil
- Attendance: 10,265

Event chronology
UFC Fight Night: Cowboy vs. Till	UFC Fight Night: Brunson vs. Machida	UFC 217: Bisping vs. St-Pierre

UFC Fight Night: Brunson vs. Machida (also known as UFC Fight Night 119) was a mixed martial arts event produced by the Ultimate Fighting Championship held on October 28, 2017, at Ginásio do Ibirapuera in São Paulo, Brazil.

== Background ==
A middleweight bout between former UFC Light Heavyweight Champion Lyoto Machida and Derek Brunson headlined this event.

A light heavyweight bout between former title challenger Glover Teixeira and Misha Cirkunov was expected to take place at this event, but was delayed and rescheduled for UFC on Fox: Lawler vs. dos Anjos after a recent hand surgery for Teixeira was slow to heal.

On September 19, promotional newcomer Carlos Felipe was flagged for a potential USADA violation stemming from an out-of-competition sample collected July 29. Therefore, he was pulled from his UFC debut against Christian Colombo. He was replaced by fellow promotional newcomer Marcelo Golm. On October 20, it was announced that Felipe accepted a two-year suspension retroactive to the date of his provisional suspension. He tested positive for metabolites of stanozolol, 16β‐hydroxy‐stanozolol and 3’‐hydroxy‐stanozolol.

Augusto Mendes was expected to face promotional newcomer Boston Salmon at the event. However, Mendes pulled out of the fight on October 3 citing a leg injury. He was replaced a week later by promotional newcomer Raoni Barcelos. Subsequently, Salmon pulled out of the fight on October 20 citing his own injury. As a result, Barcelos was removed from the card as well.

On October 6, it was announced that Luan Chagas fractured his foot and pulled out of his welterweight bout against Niko Price. He was replaced by Vicente Luque.

== Results ==
Main Card (Fox Sports 1)
Weight class				Method	Round	Time	Notes
Middleweight	Derek Brunson	def.	Lyoto Machida	KO (punches)	1	2:30
Welterweight	Colby Covington	def.	Demian Maia	Decision (unanimous) (29–27, 30–27, 30–26)	3	5:00
Bantamweight	Pedro Munhoz	def.	Rob Font	Submission (guillotine choke)	1	4:03
Lightweight	Francisco Trinaldo	def.	Jim Miller	Decision (unanimous) (29–28, 29–28, 29–28)	3	5:00
Middleweight	Thiago Santos	def.	Jack Hermansson	TKO (jumping body kick and punches)	1	4:59
Bantamweight	John Lineker	def.	Marlon Vera	Decision (unanimous) (30–27, 29–28, 29–28)	3	5:00
Preliminary Card (Fox Sports 2)
Welterweight	Vicente Luque	def.	Niko Price	Submission (D'arce choke)	2	4:08
Middleweight	Antônio Carlos Júnior	def.	Jack Marshman	Submission (rear-naked choke)	1	4:30
Lightweight	Jared Gordon	def.	Hacran Dias	Decision (unanimous) (29–26, 29–27, 30–26)	3	5:00
Welterweight	Elizeu Zaleski dos Santos	def.	Max Griffin	Decision (unanimous) (29–28, 29–27, 29–28)	3	5:00
Preliminary Card (UFC Fight Pass)
Flyweight	Deiveson Figueiredo	def.	Jarred Brooks	Decision (split) (27–30, 29–28, 29–28)	3	5:00
Heavyweight	Marcelo Golm	def.	Christian Colombo	Submission (rear-naked choke)	1	2:08

== Bonus awards ==
The following fighters were awarded $50,000 bonuses:

- Fight of the Night: Elizeu Zaleski dos Santos vs. Max Griffin
- Performance of the Night: Derek Brunson and Pedro Munhoz

== See also ==
- List of UFC events
- 2017 in UFC
