= UFC Fight Night: Cowboy vs. Till =

UFC mixed martial arts event in 2017

- The poster for UFC Fight Night: Cowboy vs. Till
- Promotion: Ultimate Fighting Championship
- Date: October 21, 2017
- Venue: Ergo Arena
- City: Gdańsk/Sopot, Poland
- Attendance: 11,138
- Total gate: $677,000

Event chronology
UFC 216: Ferguson vs. Lee	UFC Fight Night: Cowboy vs. Till	UFC Fight Night: Brunson vs. Machida

UFC Fight Night: Cowboy vs. Till (also known as UFC Fight Night 118) was a mixed martial arts event produced by the Ultimate Fighting Championship held on October 21, 2017 at Ergo Arena in Gdańsk, Poland.

== Background ==
This event was the first that the UFC has hosted in Gdańsk and the second in Poland, after UFC Fight Night: Gonzaga vs. Cro Cop 2 in April 2015.

The promotion was initially targeting a middleweight bout between Thiago Santos and promotional newcomer Michał Materla to headline the event. However it was revealed on 1 September that Materla had reneged on his agreement with the UFC and was re-signing with the Polish regional promotion KSW. In turn, Santos was removed from the card and faced Jack Hermansson a week later at UFC Fight Night: Brunson vs. Machida.

Subsequently, a welterweight bout between former UFC Lightweight Championship challenger Donald Cerrone and Darren Till was tabbed as the event headliner.

A heavyweight bout between Dmitry Smolyakov and promotional newcomer Adam Wieczorek was initially scheduled to take place at UFC 214. However, the bout was removed from that card for undisclosed reasons on July 17 and was expected take place at this event. In turn, Smolyakov was removed from the event on October 4 and was replaced by Anthony Hamilton. The bout was scratched a day before the event due to "safety concerns," as a few Lechia Gdańsk ultras – extreme and sometimes violent supporters of the local football team – showed up just prior to the weigh-ins. Wieczorek is a supporter of Ruch Chorzów, a Lechia Gdańsk rival team. The fighters were absent from ceremonial weigh-ins due to that reason, but the bout was eventually canceled and rescheduled for UFC Fight Night: Werdum vs. Tybura a month later.

Promotional newcomer Przemysław Mysiala was expected to face Jimi Manuwa at the event. However, Mysiala could not resign from Absolute Championship Berkut, therefore the bout never materialized.

Teemu Packalén was expected to face Marcin Held at the event. However Packalen pulled out of the fight on October 5 citing a knee injury. He was replaced by promotional newcomer Nasrat Haqparast.

Trevor Smith was expected to face Ramazan Emeev at the event. However, Smith pulled out of the bout in early October citing injury and was replaced by Sam Alvey.

On October 15, it was announced that Jim Wallhead pulled out of his welterweight bout against The Ultimate Fighter: Brazil 3 middleweight winner Warlley Alves due to an injury. He was replaced by promotional newcomer Salim Touahri.

At the weigh-ins, Alvey missed the middleweight limit of 185 pounds, coming in at 189 pounds. He was fined 20% of his purse and his bout with Emeev proceeded at a catchweight.

== Results ==
Main Card (UFC Fight Pass)
Weight class				Method	Round	Time	Notes
Welterweight	Darren Till	def.	Donald Cerrone	TKO (punches)	1	4:20
Women's Strawweight	Karolina Kowalkiewicz	def.	Jodie Esquibel	Decision (unanimous) (30–27, 30–27, 30–27)	3	5:00
Light Heavyweight	Jan Błachowicz	def.	Devin Clark	Submission (rear-naked choke)	2	3:02
Middleweight	Oskar Piechota	def.	Jonathan Wilson	Decision (unanimous) (30–27, 30–27, 30–27)	3	5:00
Preliminary Card (UFC Fight Pass)
Lightweight	Marcin Held	def.	Nasrat Haqparast	Decision (unanimous) (30–27, 30–27, 30–27)	3	5:00
Bantamweight	Brian Kelleher	def.	Damian Stasiak	TKO (punches)	3	3:39
Catchweight (189 lb)	Ramazan Emeev	def.	Sam Alvey	Decision (unanimous) (30–27, 30–27, 30–27)	3	5:00
Featherweight	Andre Fili	def.	Artem Lobov	Decision (unanimous) (30–27, 30–27, 30–27)	3	5:00
Welterweight	Warlley Alves	def.	Salim Touahri	Decision (unanimous) (30–27, 29–28, 29–28)	3	5:00
Women's Bantamweight	Aspen Ladd	def.	Lina Länsberg	TKO (punches)	2	2:33
Featherweight	Josh Emmett	def.	Felipe Arantes	Decision (unanimous) (30–26, 30–26, 30–25)	3	5:00

== Bonus awards ==
The following fighters were awarded $50,000 bonuses:

- Fight of the Night: Brian Kelleher vs. Damian Stasiak
- Performance of the Night: Darren Till and Jan Błachowicz

== See also ==
- List of UFC events
- 2017 in UFC
