= Randy Brown (fighter) =

American mixed martial artist (born 1990)

- Born: Randall Joseph Brown; July 8, 1990 (age 36); Springfield, Massachusetts, U.S.
- Other names: Rude Boy
- Nationality: Jamaican; American
- Height: 6 ft 3 in (1.91 m)
- Weight: 170 lb (77 kg; 12 st)
- Division: Welterweight
- Reach: 78 in (198 cm)
- Fighting out of: Queens, New York, U.S.
- Team: Budokan Martial Arts Academy (2010–present); Marquez MMA (2021–present)
- Rank: Black belt in Brazilian Jiu-Jitsu under Nardu Debrah
- Years active: 2014–present

Mixed martial arts record
- Total: 29
- Wins: 20
- By knockout: 8
- By submission: 5
- By decision: 7
- Losses: 9
- By knockout: 3
- By submission: 2
- By decision: 4

Other information
- Mixed martial arts record from Sherdog

Randall Joseph Brown (born July 8, 1990) is a Jamaican and American professional mixed martial artist. He currently competes in the Welterweight division of the Ultimate Fighting Championship (UFC). A professional since 2014, he has formerly competed for Ring of Combat and became the Welterweight Ring of Combat Champion in 2015.

== Background ==
Brown was born in Springfield, Massachusetts, to Jamaican parents, but moved to Spanish Town, Jamaica as a toddler with his mother as she was deported. His father is serving a triple-life sentence and has been incarcerated for most of Randy's life. Randy moved back to the United States at the age of 16 and attended Jamaica High School. He started boxing in 2005 before transitioning to mixed martial arts at the age of 19 and had six amateur fights before turning pro in 2014. Brown has a son.

== Mixed martial arts career ==
=== Early career ===
Brown began his professional fighting career in 2014, making his professional debut at Ring of Combat 48. Brown won the fight against Steve Tyrrell via submission in round one. He trains out of Budokan Martial Arts Academy, a Renzo Gracie BJJ affiliate.

=== Ring of Combat ===
Brown had 6 fights in the promotion winning all 6 by stoppage in the first or second round. He won the Ring of Combat welterweight belt by beating Mike Winters by second-round TKO.

=== Ultimate Fighting Championship ===
Brown was featured on Dana White's Looking For A Fight where he knocked out Robert Plotkin at Ring of Combat 53. He was signed to the UFC soon after.

Brown made his promotional debut against Matt Dwyer on January 30, 2016, at UFC on Fox 18. Brown won the fight via unanimous decision.

Brown faced Michael Graves on April 16, 2016, at UFC on Fox 19. He lost the fight via submission in the second round.

Brown returned to face Erick Montaño on September 17, 2016, at UFC Fight Night 94. He won the fight via submission in the third round.

Brown was expected to face promotional newcomer Charlie Ward on December 9, 2016, at UFC Fight Night 102. However, Ward was pulled from the event due in early November due to alleged visa issues which restricted his travel and was replaced by fellow newcomer Brian Camozzi. Brown won the fight via TKO in the second round.

Brown was expected to face George Sullivan on February 11, 2017, at UFC 208. However, on January 26, Sullivan was pulled from the card after being notified by USADA of a potential anti-doping violation stemming from an out-of-competition sample collected earlier this year. Belal Muhammad was the eventual replacement. Brown lost the fight via unanimous decision.

Brown faced Mickey Gall on November 4, 2017, at UFC 217. He won the fight by unanimous decision.

Brown faced Niko Price on July 14, 2018, at UFC Fight Night 133. He lost the fight via knockout in the second round after Price landed several hammerfists from the bottom to knock Brown out.

Brown was expected to face Chance Rencountre on January 19, 2019, at UFC Fight Night 143. However, Brown pulled out of the fight in early January for undisclosed reasons.

Brown faced Bryan Barberena on June 22, 2019, at UFC Fight Night 154. He won the fight via TKO in the third round.

Brown faced Warlley Alves at UFC Fight Night 164 on November 16, 2019. He won the fight via a triangle choke submission in the second round. This win earned him the Performance of the Night award.

Brown was scheduled to face Vicente Luque on April 11, 2020, at UFC Fight Night: Overeem vs. Harris. Due to the COVID-19 pandemic, the event was eventually postponed.

The bout with Luque was rescheduled and took place on August 1, 2020, at UFC Fight Night 173. Brown lost the fight by knockout in the second round.

Brown was expected to face Alex Oliveira on February 27, 2021, at UFC Fight Night 186. However, Brown pulled out of the fight during the week leading up to the event due to undisclosed reasons. The pair was rescheduled and they eventually met at UFC 261 on April 24, 2021. Brown won the fight via a one-armed rear naked choke in the first round.

Brown faced Jared Gooden on October 9, 2021, at UFC Fight Night 194. At the weight-ins, Gooden weighted 174 pounds, three pounds over the limit of non-championship welterweight bouts. The bout proceeded to a catchweight bout. Gooden was fined 20% of his purse and it went to Brown. He won the fight via unanimous decision.

Brown faced Khaos Williams on May 7, 2022, at UFC 274. He won the fight via split decision.

Brown faced Francisco Trinaldo on October 1, 2022, at UFC Fight Night 211. He won the bout via unanimous decision.

Brown faced Jack Della Maddalena on February 12, 2023, at UFC 284 He lost the bout via first round submission.

Brown faced Wellington Turman on June 24, 2023, at UFC on ABC 5. He won the bout via unanimous decision.

Brown was scheduled to face Muslim Salikhov on December 16, 2023, at UFC 296. However, the bout was scrapped after Brown withdrew due to illness. The pair was rescheduled to meet at UFC Fight Night 235 on February 3, 2024. Brown won by first-round knockout with a right-hand punch. This fight earned him the Performance of the Night award.

Brown faced Elizeu Zaleski dos Santos on June 1, 2024, at UFC 302. He won the fight by unanimous decision.

Brown was reportedly scheduled to face Carlos Prates on November 16, 2024, at UFC 309. However, Prates ended up being scheduled to face Neil Magny at another event instead.

Brown faced The Ultimate Fighter 29 middleweight tournament winner Bryan Battle on December 7, 2024, at UFC 310. At the weigh-ins, Battle weighed in at 175 pounds, four pounds over the welterweight non-title fight limit. The bout proceeded at catchweight and Battle was fined 30 percent of his purse which went to Brown. Brown lost the fight by split decision.

Brown faced Nicolas Dalby on April 26, 2025, at UFC on ESPN 66. He won the fight by knockout in the second round. This fight earned him his first Fight of the Night award.

Brown was scheduled to face Gabriel Bonfim on October 11, 2025, at UFC Fight Night 261. However, the bout was moved to UFC Fight Night 264 on November 8, 2025, to serve as the main event. He lost via knockout in the second round.

Brown faced Kevin Holland on April 11, 2026 at UFC 327. He lost the fight by unanimous decision.

Brown was scheduled to face Carlos Leal on October 31, 2026, at UFC Fight Night 292. However, Leal withdrew due to an injury and was replaced by undefeated prospect Jacobe Smith. Brown lost the fight by unanimous decision.

== Professional grappling career ==
Brown competed in the main event of Rise Invitational 11 on April 1, 2023, against 10th Planet black belt Rene Sousa. Brown was submitted with a triangle-armbar.

== Championships and achievements ==
=== Mixed martial arts ===
- Ultimate Fighting Championship
  - Performance of the Night (Two times) vs. Warlley Alves and Muslim Salikhov
  - Fight of the Night (One time) vs. Nicolas Dalby
  - UFC.com Awards
    - 2016: Ranked #4 Newcomer of the Year
- Ring of Combat
  - Ring of Combat welterweight champion (One time)
    - Two successful title defenses
- MMAjunkie.com
  - 2021 April Submission of the Month vs. Alex Oliveira

== Mixed martial arts record ==
Professional record breakdown
29 matches	20 wins	9 losses
By knockout	8	3
By submission	5	2
By decision	7	4

Res.	Record	Opponent	Method	Event	Date	Round	Time	Location	Notes
Loss	20–9	Jacobe Smith	Decision (unanimous)	UFC Fight Night: Moicano vs. Nolan	October 31, 2026	3	5:00	Las Vegas, Nevada, United States	Brown was deducted one point in round 2 due to repeatedly grabbing the fence.
Loss	20–8	Kevin Holland	Decision (unanimous)	UFC 327	April 11, 2026	3	5:00	Miami, Florida, United States	
Loss	20–7	Gabriel Bonfim	TKO (knee)	UFC Fight Night: Bonfim vs. Brown	November 8, 2025	2	1:40	Las Vegas, Nevada, United States	
Win	20–6	Nicolas Dalby	KO (punch)	UFC on ESPN: Machado Garry vs. Prates	April 26, 2025	2	1:39	Kansas City, Missouri, United States	Fight of the Night.
Loss	19–6	Bryan Battle	Decision (split)	UFC 310	December 7, 2024	3	5:00	Las Vegas, Nevada, United States	Catchweight (175 lb) bout; Battle missed weight.
Win	19–5	Elizeu Zaleski dos Santos	Decision (unanimous)	UFC 302	June 1, 2024	3	5:00	Newark, New Jersey, United States	
Win	18–5	Muslim Salikhov	KO (punches)	UFC Fight Night: Dolidze vs. Imavov	February 3, 2024	1	3:17	Las Vegas, Nevada, United States	Performance of the Night.
Win	17–5	Wellington Turman	Decision (unanimous)	UFC on ABC: Emmett vs. Topuria	June 24, 2023	3	5:00	Jacksonville, Florida, United States	
Loss	16–5	Jack Della Maddalena	Submission (rear-naked choke)	UFC 284	February 12, 2023	1	2:13	Perth, Australia	
Win	16–4	Francisco Trinaldo	Decision (unanimous)	UFC Fight Night: Dern vs. Yan	October 1, 2022	3	5:00	Las Vegas, Nevada, United States	
Win	15–4	Khaos Williams	Decision (split)	UFC 274	May 7, 2022	3	5:00	Phoenix, Arizona, United States	
Win	14–4	Jared Gooden	Decision (unanimous)	UFC Fight Night: Dern vs. Rodriguez	October 9, 2021	3	5:00	Las Vegas, Nevada, United States	Catchweight (174 lb) bout; Gooden missed weight.
Win	13–4	Alex Oliveira	Submission (rear-naked choke)	UFC 261	April 24, 2021	1	2:50	Jacksonville, Florida, United States	
Loss	12–4	Vicente Luque	KO (knee and punches)	UFC Fight Night: Brunson vs. Shahbazyan	August 1, 2020	2	4:56	Las Vegas, Nevada, United States	
Win	12–3	Warlley Alves	Submission (triangle choke)	UFC Fight Night: Błachowicz vs. Jacaré	November 16, 2019	2	1:22	São Paulo, Brazil	Performance of the Night.
Win	11–3	Bryan Barberena	TKO (punches)	UFC Fight Night: Moicano vs. The Korean Zombie	June 22, 2019	3	2:54	Greenville, South Carolina, United States	
Loss	10–3	Niko Price	KO (punches)	UFC Fight Night: dos Santos vs. Ivanov	July 14, 2018	2	1:09	Boise, Idaho, United States	
Win	10–2	Mickey Gall	Decision (unanimous)	UFC 217	November 4, 2017	3	5:00	New York City, New York, United States	
Loss	9–2	Belal Muhammad	Decision (unanimous)	UFC 208	February 11, 2017	3	5:00	Brooklyn, New York, United States	
Win	9–1	Brian Camozzi	TKO (knee and punches)	UFC Fight Night: Lewis vs. Abdurakhimov	December 9, 2016	2	1:25	Albany, New York, United States	
Win	8–1	Erick Montaño	Submission (guillotine choke)	UFC Fight Night: Poirier vs. Johnson	September 17, 2016	3	0:18	Hidalgo, Texas, United States	
Loss	7–1	Michael Graves	Submission (rear-naked choke)	UFC on Fox: Teixeira vs. Evans	April 16, 2016	2	2:31	Tampa, Florida, United States	
Win	7–0	Matt Dwyer	Decision (unanimous)	UFC on Fox: Johnson vs. Bader	January 30, 2016	3	5:00	Newark, New Jersey, United States	
Win	6–0	Robert Plotkin	KO (knee)	Ring of Combat 53	November 20, 2015	1	4:23	Atlantic City, New Jersey, United States	Defended the Ring of Combat Welterweight Championship.
Win	5–0	Ben Brewer	Submission (guillotine choke)	Ring of Combat 52	September 25, 2015	2	0:31	Atlantic City, New Jersey, United States	Catchweight (178 lb) bout.
Win	4–0	Rocky Edwards	TKO (punches)	Ring of Combat 51	June 5, 2015	2	4:25	Atlantic City, New Jersey, United States	Defended the Ring of Combat Welterweight Championship.
Win	3–0	Mike Winters	TKO (punches)	Ring of Combat 50	January 23, 2015	2	1:11	Atlantic City, New Jersey, United States	Won the Ring of Combat Welterweight Championship.
Win	2–0	Leonard Simpson	TKO (punches)	Ring of Combat 49	September 19, 2014	2	0:52	Atlantic City, New Jersey, United States	
Win	1–0	Steve Tyrrell	Submission (armbar)	Ring of Combat 48	May 16, 2014	1	1:53	Atlantic City, New Jersey, United States	

== See also ==
- List of current UFC fighters
- List of male mixed martial artists
