= Bryan Barberena =

American mixed martial arts fighter

- Born: May 3, 1989 (age 37); Montclair, California, U.S.
- Other names: Bam Bam
- Height: 6 ft 0 in (1.83 m)
- Weight: 185 lb (84 kg; 13.2 st)
- Division: Middleweight; Welterweight; Lightweight
- Fighting out of: Minneapolis, Minnesota
- Team: MMA Lab (formerly); Gym-O (2018–present)
- Rank: Blue belt in Brazilian Jiu-Jitsu under John Crouch
- Years active: 2009–present

Mixed martial arts record
- Total: 30
- Wins: 18
- By knockout: 11
- By submission: 2
- By decision: 5
- Losses: 12
- By knockout: 2
- By submission: 4
- By decision: 6

Other information
- Mixed martial arts record from Sherdog

Bryan Barberena (born May 3, 1989) is an American mixed martial artist formerly fighting in the Middleweight division in the Ultimate Fighting Championship. A professional competitor since 2009, he has also competed for King of the Cage.

== Background ==
Barberena was born in Montclair, California, but grew up in Rancho Cucamonga, California, where he moved with his parents at a young age. He moved to Arizona during his sophomore year, and attended Prescott High School, where he played football and was a standout as a linebacker.

Barberena's father is originally from Cali, Colombia, and Barberena has stated he feels both American and Colombian. He brings each country's flags to his fights.

== Mixed martial arts career ==
=== Early career ===
Barberena begin his professional mixed martial arts career in late 2009 with an amateur record of 1–0. Over the next five years he trained primarily at the MMA Lab in Arizona and amassed a record of 9–2 for promotions such as Dakota Fighting Championships and King of the Cage; all but one of his wins came before the final bell.

=== Ultimate Fighting Championship ===
Barberena made his UFC debut in December 2014 when he faced Joe Ellenberger on December 13, 2014, at UFC on Fox 13. He won the fight via TKO in the third round.

In his second fight for the promotion, Barberena faced Chad Laprise at UFC 186. He lost the fight via unanimous decision. Both participants were awarded Fight of the Night honors.

In his third fight for the promotion, Barberena filled in as a short notice replacement for Andrew Holbrook against Sage Northcutt at UFC on Fox: Johnson vs. Bader. With the late change, the matchup was contested at welterweight. Despite being a heavy underdog, Barberena won the bout via choke in the second round.

In his fourth fight for the promotion, Barberena faced Warlley Alves at UFC 198. Once again a substantial underdog, Barberena won the fight by unanimous decision after withstanding the initial storm.

Barberena next faced Colby Covington on December 17, 2016, at UFC on Fox 22. He lost the fight by unanimous decision.

Barberena next faced Joe Proctor on April 23, 2017, at UFC Fight Night: Swanson vs. Lobov. He won the fight via TKO in the first round.

Barberena faced Leon Edwards on September 2, 2017, at UFC Fight Night 115. He lost the fight by unanimous decision.

Barberena was expected to face Jake Ellenberger on June 1, 2018, at UFC Fight Night 131. However, on March 23, 2018, Barberena pulled out due to injury. The pairing was rescheduled and took place on August 25, 2018, at UFC Fight Night 135. He won the fight via technical knockout in the first round.

After having split his training at MMA Lab and Gym-O before Ellenberger fight, Barberena decided to move his camp entirely to Gym-O in Gastonia, North Carolina in order to be closer to his residence near Knoxville, Tennessee. Barberena faced Vicente Luque on February 17, 2019, at UFC on ESPN 1. After a back-and-forth two rounds, he lost the fight via TKO late in the third round. This fight earned him the Fight of the Night award.

Barberena faced Randy Brown on June 22, 2019, at UFC Fight Night 154. He lost the fight via TKO in the third round.

Barberena faced Anthony Ivy on September 12, 2020, at UFC Fight Night 177. He won the fight via unanimous decision.

Barberena was expected to face Daniel Rodriguez on November 14, 2020, at UFC Fight Night: Felder vs. dos Anjos. However, Barberena underwent an emergency laparotomy a week before the event due to "internal bleeding from a couple ruptured arteries in his omentum" and was sidelined indefinitely.

Barberena faced Jason Witt on July 31, 2021, at UFC on ESPN 28. He lost the fight via majority decision. This fight earned him the Fight of the Night award.

Barberena was scheduled to face Matt Brown on December 4, 2021, at UFC on ESPN 31. However, Brown forced out of the bout due to testing positive for COVID-19, and he was replaced by Darian Weeks. Barberena won the fight via unanimous decision.

The bout against Brown was rescheduled and eventually took place on March 26, 2022, at UFC on ESPN 33. Barberena won the back-and-forth bout via split decision. The fight was awarded the Fight of the Night award.

Barberena faced Robbie Lawler on July 2, 2022, at UFC 276. He won the back-and-forth bout by TKO in the second round. This fight earned him a Fight of the Night award.

Barberena faced Rafael dos Anjos on December 3, 2022, at UFC on ESPN 42. He lost via neck crank in the second round.

Barbarena, as a replacement for Daniel Rodriguez, faced Gunnar Nelson on March 18, 2023, at UFC 286. He lost the fight via an armbar submission in the first round.

Barbarena faced Makhmud Muradov on July 22, 2023, at UFC Fight Night 224. He lost the fight via unanimous decision.

Barberena faced Gerald Meerschaert on March 16, 2024, at UFC Fight Night 239. He lost the bout by a rear-naked choke submission at the end of the second round.

Barberena was released from the UFC on March 21, 2024.

== Personal life ==
Barberena and his wife Diana have three children.

== Championships and accomplishments ==
- Ultimate Fighting Championship
  - Fight of the Night (Five times) vs. Chad Laprise, Vicente Luque, Jason Witt, Matt Brown, and Robbie Lawler
  - UFC.com Awards
    - 2016: Ranked #6 Upset of the Year vs. Warlley Alves & Ranked #7 Upset of the Year vs. Sage Northcutt
    - 2019: Ranked #5 Fight of the Year vs. Vicente Luque
- MMA Junkie
  - 2019 February Fight of the Month vs. Vicente Luque
- CBS Sports
  - 2019 #3 Ranked UFC Fight of the Year vs. Vicente Luque

== Mixed martial arts record ==
Professional record breakdown
30 matches	18 wins	12 losses
By knockout	11	2
By submission	2	4
By decision	5	6

Res.	Record	Opponent	Method	Event	Date	Round	Time	Location	Notes
Loss	18–12	Gerald Meerschaert	Technical Submission (face crank)	UFC Fight Night: Tuivasa vs. Tybura	March 16, 2024	2	4:23	Las Vegas, Nevada, United States	
Loss	18–11	Makhmud Muradov	Decision (unanimous)	UFC Fight Night: Aspinall vs. Tybura	July 22, 2023	3	5:00	London, England	Middleweight debut.
Loss	18–10	Gunnar Nelson	Submission (armbar)	UFC 286	March 18, 2023	1	4:51	London, England	
Loss	18–9	Rafael dos Anjos	Submission (neck crank)	UFC on ESPN: Thompson vs. Holland	December 3, 2022	2	3:20	Orlando, Florida, United States	
Win	18–8	Robbie Lawler	TKO (punches)	UFC 276	July 2, 2022	2	4:47	Las Vegas, Nevada, United States	Fight of the Night.
Win	17–8	Matt Brown	Decision (split)	UFC on ESPN: Blaydes vs. Daukaus	March 26, 2022	3	5:00	Columbus, Ohio, United States	Fight of the Night.
Win	16–8	Darian Weeks	Decision (unanimous)	UFC on ESPN: Font vs. Aldo	December 4, 2021	3	5:00	Las Vegas, Nevada, United States	
Loss	15–8	Jason Witt	Decision (majority)	UFC on ESPN: Hall vs. Strickland	July 31, 2021	3	5:00	Las Vegas, Nevada, United States	Fight of the Night.
Win	15–7	Anthony Ivy	Decision (unanimous)	UFC Fight Night: Waterson vs. Hill	September 12, 2020	3	5:00	Las Vegas, Nevada, United States	
Loss	14–7	Randy Brown	TKO (punches)	UFC Fight Night: Moicano vs. The Korean Zombie	June 22, 2019	3	2:54	Greenville, South Carolina, United States	
Loss	14–6	Vicente Luque	TKO (knees and punches)	UFC on ESPN: Ngannou vs. Velasquez	February 17, 2019	3	4:54	Phoenix, Arizona, United States	Fight of the Night.
Win	14–5	Jake Ellenberger	TKO (punches)	UFC Fight Night: Gaethje vs. Vick	August 25, 2018	1	2:26	Lincoln, Nebraska, United States	
Loss	13–5	Leon Edwards	Decision (unanimous)	UFC Fight Night: Volkov vs. Struve	September 2, 2017	3	5:00	Rotterdam, Netherlands	
Win	13–4	Joe Proctor	TKO (knees and punches)	UFC Fight Night: Swanson vs. Lobov	April 22, 2017	1	3:30	Nashville, Tennessee, United States	
Loss	12–4	Colby Covington	Decision (unanimous)	UFC on Fox: VanZant vs. Waterson	December 17, 2016	3	5:00	Sacramento, California, United States	
Win	12–3	Warlley Alves	Decision (unanimous)	UFC 198	May 14, 2016	3	5:00	Curitiba, Brazil	
Win	11–3	Sage Northcutt	Submission (arm-triangle choke)	UFC on Fox: Johnson vs. Bader	January 30, 2016	2	3:06	Newark, New Jersey, United States	Return to Welterweight.
Loss	10–3	Chad Laprise	Decision (unanimous)	UFC 186	April 25, 2015	3	5:00	Montreal, Quebec, Canada	Fight of the Night.
Win	10–2	Joe Ellenberger	TKO (punches)	UFC on Fox: dos Santos vs. Miocic	December 13, 2014	3	3:24	Phoenix, Arizona, United States	Lightweight debut.
Win	9–2	Eric Moon	TKO (punches)	KOTC: Radar Lock	February 22, 2014	1	4:07	Scottsdale, Arizona, United States	
Win	8–2	Damien Hill	Submission (rear-naked choke)	Dakota FC 17: Winter Brawl 2014	January 11, 2014	3	2:17	Fargo, North Dakota, United States	Catchweight (160 lb) bout.
Win	7–2	Marcos Marquez	TKO (punches)	Dakota FC 16: Fall Brawl 2013	August 23, 2013	3	3:43	Fargo, North Dakota, United States	
Win	6–2	Dane Sayers	Decision (unanimous)	Dakota FC 13: Coming Home	October 13, 2012	5	5:00	Grand Forks, North Dakota, United States	
Win	5–2	Vernon Harrison	TKO (punches)	Crowbar MMA: Rumble at the Fair	June 25, 2011	2	4:00	Grand Forks, North Dakota, United States	
Win	4–2	Garrett Olson	TKO (punches)	KOTC: Mainstream	October 29, 2010	2	4:24	Morton, Minnesota, United States	
Loss	3–2	Tyler Klejeski	Decision (unanimous)	Cage Fighting Xtreme	May 15, 2010	3	5:00	Red Lake, Minnesota, United States	
Win	3–1	David Barnett	KO (punches)	KOTC: Uppercut	March 13, 2010	1	2:25	Laughlin, Nevada United States	
Loss	2–1	Derek Smith	Submission (armbar)	KOTC: Offensive Strategy	February 6, 2010	3	2:55	Walker, Minnesota, United States	
Win	2–0	Dave Alvarez	TKO (punches)	The Cage Inc.: Battle at the Border 3	December 19, 2009	2	1:41	Hankinson, North Dakota, United States	
Win	1–0	Dirk Thiedeman	KO (punches)	Dakota FC 12	October 10, 2009	1	2:20	Fargo, North Dakota, United States	

== Amateur mixed martial arts record ==
Res.	Record	Opponent	Method	Event	Date	Round	Time	Location	Notes
Win	1–0	Brandon Rossbach	Decision (unanimous)	KOTC: Turmoil	September 5, 2009	3	3:00	Walker, Minnesota, United States	

== See also ==
- List of male mixed martial artists
