= Mickey Gall =

American mixed martial arts fighter

- Born: January 22, 1992 (age 34); Green Brook, New Jersey, United States
- Height: 6 ft 2 in (188 cm)
- Weight: 170 lb (77 kg; 12 st)
- Division: Welterweight Middleweight
- Reach: 74 in (188 cm)
- Fighting out of: Green Brook, New Jersey, United States
- Team: Gracie New Jersey Academy; Miller Brothers MMA; Sanford MMA (2022–present)
- Rank: Black belt in Brazilian Jiu-Jitsu under David Adiv; Blue band in Muay Thai under Kaensak Sor.Ploenjit
- Years active: 2015–present

Mixed martial arts record
- Total: 15
- Wins: 7
- By submission: 6
- By decision: 1
- Losses: 8
- By knockout: 3
- By decision: 5

Other information
- University: Rutgers University
- Website: http://www.mickeygall.com
- Mixed martial arts record from Sherdog

Mickey Gall (born January 22, 1992) is an American professional mixed martial artist who competes in the Middleweight division of the Ultimate Fighting Championship. He is best known for defeating former WWE star CM Punk in his promotional debut at UFC 203.

== Early life ==
Gall was born in Green Brook, New Jersey. He began training in boxing at the age of 13, and transitioned to Brazilian jiu-jitsu at 16. Gall was also a wrestler and football captain at Watchung Hills Regional High School. In order to pay for his jiu-jitsu training as a full-time Rutgers student, Gall worked as a bread truck driver for Walmart.

Gall is an accomplished grappler, having won multiple North American Grappling Association and Grapplers Quest titles.

== Mixed martial arts career ==
After going 3–0 as an amateur, Gall made his professional debut for the Dead Serious MMA promotion in November 2015. He faced fellow debutant Ron Templeton and won via submission in the first round. Gall's bout was featured on Dana White's Lookin' for a Fight reality show, which earned him a UFC contract.

=== Ultimate Fighting Championship ===
Gall made his promotional debut on February 6, 2016, at UFC Fight Night 82, where he faced fellow newcomer Mike Jackson. After rapidly knocking Jackson down, Gall won the fight by submission just 45 seconds into the first round and earned a bout against CM Punk.

Gall was initially expected to face CM Punk on June 4, 2016, at UFC 199, but the pairing was delayed after Punk suffered a herniated disc. The fight eventually took place on September 10, 2016, at UFC 203. Gall took down Punk early in the fight and submitted him with a rear-naked choke in the first round.

Gall next faced Sage Northcutt on December 17, 2016, at UFC on Fox 22. In the second round Gall was knocked down and subsequently scored a knockdown himself, eventually winning the fight via submission.

Gall faced Randy Brown on November 4, 2017, at UFC 217. He lost the fight via unanimous decision.

Gall faced George Sullivan on August 25, 2018, at UFC Fight Night 135. He won the fight via submission in the first round, marking Gall's fifth rear-naked choke victory in five career wins.

Gall faced Diego Sanchez on March 2, 2019, at UFC 235. He lost the fight via TKO in the second round.

Gall faced Salim Touahri on August 3, 2019, at UFC on ESPN 5. He won the fight via unanimous decision.

Gall was scheduled to face Carlos Condit on December 7, 2019, at UFC on ESPN 7. However, Condit was forced to pull from the event due to a detached retina, thus the bout was subsequently cancelled.

Gall was scheduled to face Alex Oliveira on February 29, 2020, at UFC Fight Night 169. However, on December 27, 2019, the bout was pulled from the event by the UFC. The bout was not replaced and no reason for the cancellation was given by the promotion.

Gall next faced Mike Perry on June 27, 2020, at UFC on ESPN: Poirier vs. Hooker. After getting knocked down in the second round, he ultimately lost the fight via unanimous decision.

Gall was scheduled to face Miguel Baeza on September 19, 2020, at UFC Fight Night 178. However, on September 10, 2020, Gall pulled from the event due to injury.

Gall faced Jordan Williams on July 24, 2021, at UFC on ESPN: Sandhagen vs. Dillashaw. He won the fight via rear-naked choke submission in round one.

Gall faced Alex Morono on December 4, 2021 at UFC on ESPN 31. After getting knocked down in the first round, he lost the fight via unanimous decision.

As the last fight of his prevailing contract, Gall faced Mike Malott on April 9, 2022, at UFC 273. He lost the fight via knockout in round one.

In September 2022, it was reported that Gall had fought out his contract and was no longer part of the UFC roster.

=== Return to UFC ===
Gall faced Bassil Hafez on June 1, 2024, at UFC 302. He lost the fight by unanimous decision.

Gall faced Ramiz Brahimaj on November 16, 2024 at UFC 309. He lost the fight by knockout in the first round.

Moving to the middleweight division, Gall was scheduled to face Sedriques Dumas on September 26, 2026 at UFC Fight Night 289. However, Gall was removed from the bout two days before the event due to medical issues and was replaced by promotional newcomer Luis Hernandez.

Gall faced Zachary Reese on October 31, 2026 at UFC Fight Night 292. After Reese was deducted one point due to an accidental eye poke, Gall lost the fight by unanimous decision.

== Championships and accomplishments ==
=== Mixed martial arts ===
- Ultimate Fighting Championship
  - UFC.com Awards
    - 2016: Newcomer of the Year

== Mixed martial arts record ==
Professional record breakdown
15 matches	7 wins	8 losses
By knockout	0	3
By submission	6	0
By decision	1	5

Res.	Record	Opponent	Method	Event	Date	Round	Time	Location	Notes
Loss	7–8	Zachary Reese	Decision (unanimous)	UFC Fight Night: Moicano vs. Nolan	October 31, 2026	3	5:00	Las Vegas, Nevada, United States	Middleweight debut. Reese was deducted one point in round 1 due to an eye poke.
Loss	7–7	Ramiz Brahimaj	KO (punches)	UFC 309	November 16, 2024	1	2:55	New York City, New York, United States	
Loss	7–6	Bassil Hafez	Decision (unanimous)	UFC 302	June 1, 2024	3	5:00	Newark, New Jersey, United States	
Loss	7–5	Mike Malott	TKO (punches)	UFC 273	April 9, 2022	1	3:41	Jacksonville, Florida, United States	
Loss	7–4	Alex Morono	Decision (unanimous)	UFC on ESPN: Font vs. Aldo	December 4, 2021	3	5:00	Las Vegas, Nevada, United States	
Win	7–3	Jordan Williams	Submission (rear-naked choke)	UFC on ESPN: Sandhagen vs. Dillashaw	July 24, 2021	1	2:57	Las Vegas, Nevada, United States	
Loss	6–3	Mike Perry	Decision (unanimous)	UFC on ESPN: Poirier vs. Hooker	June 27, 2020	3	5:00	Las Vegas, Nevada, United States	
Win	6–2	Salim Touahri	Decision (unanimous)	UFC on ESPN: Covington vs. Lawler	August 3, 2019	3	5:00	Newark, New Jersey, United States	
Loss	5–2	Diego Sanchez	TKO (punches)	UFC 235	March 2, 2019	2	4:13	Las Vegas, Nevada, United States	
Win	5–1	George Sullivan	Submission (rear-naked choke)	UFC Fight Night: Gaethje vs. Vick	August 25, 2018	1	1:09	Lincoln, Nebraska, United States	
Loss	4–1	Randy Brown	Decision (unanimous)	UFC 217	November 4, 2017	3	5:00	New York City, New York, United States	
Win	4–0	Sage Northcutt	Submission (rear-naked choke)	UFC on Fox: VanZant vs. Waterson	December 17, 2016	2	1:40	Sacramento, California, United States	
Win	3–0	CM Punk	Submission (rear-naked choke)	UFC 203	September 10, 2016	1	2:14	Cleveland, Ohio, United States	
Win	2–0	Mike Jackson	Submission (rear-naked choke)	UFC Fight Night: Hendricks vs. Thompson	February 6, 2016	1	0:45	Las Vegas, Nevada, United States	
Win	1–0	Ron Templeton	Submission (rear-naked choke)	Dead Serious MMA 17	November 21, 2015	1	2:53	Philadelphia, Pennsylvania, United States	Welterweight debut.

== See also ==
- List of current UFC fighters
- List of male mixed martial artists
