= Warlley Alves =

Brazilian mixed martial arts fighter

- Born: 4 January 1991 (age 35); Governador Valadares, Minas Gerais, Brazil
- Height: 5 ft 11 in (180 cm)
- Weight: 186 lb (84 kg; 13 st 4 lb)
- Division: Welterweight (2011–present); Middleweight (2014; 2023)
- Reach: 72 in (183 cm)
- Fighting out of: Rio de Janeiro, Rio de Janeiro, Brazil
- Team: X-Gym (2011–2018); Team Nogueira (2018); Rizzo RVT (2018–present)
- Years active: 2011–present

Mixed martial arts record
- Total: 22
- Wins: 14
- By knockout: 4
- By submission: 6
- By decision: 4
- Losses: 8
- By knockout: 3
- By submission: 1
- By decision: 4

Other information
- Mixed martial arts record from Sherdog
- Last updated on: 15 May 2016

Warlley Alves (born 4 January 1991) is a Brazilian mixed martial artist who competed in the Welterweight and Middleweight divisions of the Ultimate Fighting Championship. A professional MMA competitor since 2011, Warlley made a name for himself fighting at Jungle Fight. He is the winner of The Ultimate Fighter: Brazil 3 Middleweight tournament.

== Background ==
Alves started training kickboxing at the age of 10, winning three Brazilian kickboxing championships in the process.

== Mixed martial arts career ==
=== The Ultimate Fighter ===
On 26 February 2014 it was revealed that Alves was selected to be a participant on The Ultimate Fighter: Brazil 3. Alves defeated Wendell Oliveira by split decision to move into the Ultimate Fighter house, and become an official cast member.

Alves was selected as the third pick (fifth overall) of coach Chael Sonnen to be a part of Team Sonnen. In his second Middleweight fight of the season, Alves was selected to fight Ismael de Jesus. Alves won via knockout (knees) in the first round. He was then scheduled to face Wagner Silva for a spot in the final against Marcio Alexandre Jr. He defeated Silva by submission (guillotine choke).

=== Ultimate Fighting Championship ===
Alves made his UFC debut on 31 May 2014 at The Ultimate Fighter Brazil 3 Finale against Márcio Alexandre Jr. to determine the winner of The Ultimate Fighter: Brazil 3 middleweight tournament. He won the fight via technical submission (guillotine choke) after only twenty-five seconds into the third round. This win earned him the Performance of the Night award. After the fight Alves stated that he would fight in the Welterweight division of UFC.

Alves next fought Alan Jouban on 8 November 2014 at UFC Fight Night 56 in the co-main event. He won the fight by a controversial unanimous decision.

Alves faced Nordine Taleb on 1 August 2015 at UFC 190. He won the fight by submission in the second round.

Alves faced Colby Covington on 12 December 2015 at UFC 194. He won the fight via a guillotine choke submission in the first round, giving Covington his first professional loss.

Alves faced Bryan Barberena on 14 May 2016 at UFC 198. Alves lost the fight by unanimous decision.

Alves next faced Kamaru Usman on 19 November 2016 at UFC Fight Night 100. He lost the fight unanimous decision.

Alves was expected to face Kiichi Kunimoto on 11 June 2017 at UFC Fight Night 110. However, Alves pulled out of the fight on 19 May and was replaced by Zak Ottow.

Alves was expected to face Jim Wallhead on 21 October 2017 at UFC Fight Night 118. Wallhead was forced out from the card citing injury and was replaced by newcomer Salim Touahri. He won the fight via unanimous decision.

Alves faced Sultan Aliev on 12 May 2018 at UFC 224. He won the fight via TKO due to a doctor stoppage at the end of the second round.

Alves faced James Krause on 25 August 2018 at UFC Fight Night 135. He lost the fight via technical knockout.

In the final fight of his prevailing contract, Alves faced Sérgio Moraes on 11 May 2019 at UFC 237. He won the fight via knockout in the third round. This fight earned him the Performance of the Night award.

After brief free agency, Alves signed a new four-fight contract with the UFC and faced Randy Brown at UFC on ESPN+ 22 on 16 November 2019. He lost the fight via a triangle choke submission in the second round.

Alves was expected to face Christian Aguilera on 16 January 2021 at UFC on ABC 1. However, Aguilera pulled out in late December due to an injury. He was replaced by Mounir Lazzez. and the pairing will take place four days later at UFC on ESPN: Chiesa vs. Magny. Alves won the fight in the first round after a flurry of kicks to the body dropped Lazzez and then finished him off on the ground. He also earned the Performance of the Night

Alves was scheduled to face Ramazan Emeev on 26 June 2021 at UFC Fight Night 190. However, Emeev pulled out in mid June due to undisclosed reasons, and he was replaced by promotional newcomer Jeremiah Wells. Alves lost the fight via knockout in round two.

Alves was scheduled to face Jack Della Maddalena on 22 January 2022, at UFC 270. However, Alves pulled out in early January due to undisclosed reasons and was replaced by Pete Rodriguez.

Alves faced Nicolas Dalby on 21 January 2023, at UFC 283. He lost the fight via split decision.

Alves faced Ikram Aliskerov in a Middleweight bout, replacing Nassourdine Imavov, on 21 October 2023, at UFC 294. He lost the fight via technical knockout in round one.

Alves faced Abusupiyan Magomedov on 18 May 2024, at UFC Fight Night 241. He lost the fight by unanimous decision.

On 19 February 2025, it was reported that Alves had parted ways with the UFC.

== Championships and awards ==
=== Mixed martial arts ===
- Ultimate Fighting Championship
  - The Ultimate Fighter: Brazil 3 Middleweight Tournament Winner
  - Performance of the Night (Three times) vs Márcio Alexandre Jr., Sérgio Moraes, and Mounir Lazzez
  - UFC.com Awards
    - 2014: Ranked #4 Newcomer of the Year

== Mixed martial arts record ==
Professional record breakdown
| 22 matches | 14 wins | 8 losses |
| By knockout | 4 | 3 |
| By submission | 6 | 1 |
| By decision | 4 | 4 |

| Res. | Record | Opponent | Method | Event | Date | Round | Time | Location | Notes |
|---|---|---|---|---|---|---|---|---|---|
| Loss | 14–8 | Abusupiyan Magomedov | Decision (unanimous) | UFC Fight Night: Barboza vs. Murphy | May 18, 2024 | 3 | 5:00 | Las Vegas, Nevada, United States | |
| Loss | 14–7 | Ikram Aliskerov | TKO (flying knee and punches) | UFC 294 | October 21, 2023 | 1 | 2:07 | Abu Dhabi, United Arab Emirates | Return to Middleweight. |
| Loss | 14–6 | Nicolas Dalby | Decision (split) | UFC 283 | January 21, 2023 | 3 | 5:00 | Rio de Janeiro, Brazil | |
| Loss | 14–5 | Jeremiah Wells | KO (punches) | UFC Fight Night: Gane vs. Volkov | June 26, 2021 | 2 | 0:30 | Las Vegas, Nevada, United States | |
| Win | 14–4 | Mounir Lazzez | TKO (body kicks and punches) | UFC on ESPN: Chiesa vs. Magny | January 20, 2021 | 1 | 2:35 | Abu Dhabi, United Arab Emirates | Performance of the Night. |
| Loss | 13–4 | Randy Brown | Submission (triangle choke) | UFC Fight Night: Błachowicz vs. Jacaré | November 16, 2019 | 2 | 1:22 | São Paulo, Brazil | |
| Win | 13–3 | Sérgio Moraes | KO (punch) | UFC 237 | May 11, 2019 | 3 | 4:13 | Rio de Janeiro, Brazil | Performance of the Night. |
| Loss | 12–3 | James Krause | TKO (knee and punches) | UFC Fight Night: Gaethje vs. Vick | August 25, 2018 | 2 | 2:28 | Lincoln, Nebraska, United States | |
| Win | 12–2 | Sultan Aliev | TKO (doctor stoppage) | UFC 224 | May 12, 2018 | 2 | 5:00 | Rio de Janeiro, Brazil | |
| Win | 11–2 | Salim Touahri | Decision (unanimous) | UFC Fight Night: Cerrone vs. Till | October 21, 2017 | 3 | 5:00 | Gdańsk, Poland | |
| Loss | 10–2 | Kamaru Usman | Decision (unanimous) | UFC Fight Night: Bader vs. Nogueira 2 | November 19, 2016 | 3 | 5:00 | São Paulo, Brazil | |
| Loss | 10–1 | Bryan Barberena | Decision (unanimous) | UFC 198 | May 14, 2016 | 3 | 5:00 | Curitiba, Brazil | |
| Win | 10–0 | Colby Covington | Submission (guillotine choke) | UFC 194 | December 12, 2015 | 1 | 1:26 | Las Vegas, Nevada, United States | |
| Win | 9–0 | Nordine Taleb | Submission (guillotine choke) | UFC 190 | August 1, 2015 | 2 | 4:11 | Rio de Janeiro, Brazil | |
| Win | 8–0 | Alan Jouban | Decision (unanimous) | UFC Fight Night: Shogun vs. Saint Preux | November 8, 2014 | 3 | 5:00 | Uberlândia, Brazil | Return to Welterweight. |
| Win | 7–0 | Márcio Alexandre Jr. | Technical Submission (guillotine choke) | The Ultimate Fighter Brazil 3 Finale: Miocic vs. Maldonado | May 31, 2014 | 3 | 0:25 | São Paulo, Brazil | Middleweight debut. Won The Ultimate Fighter: Brazil 3 Middleweight Tournament. Performance of the Night. |
| Win | 6–0 | Mike Jackson | TKO (punches) | Jungle Fight 56 | August 24, 2013 | 1 | 1:58 | Foz do Iguaçu, Brazil | |
| Win | 5–0 | Ederson Moreira | Submission (guillotine choke) | Jungle Fight 53 | June 1, 2013 | 1 | 0:48 | Japeri, Brazil | |
| Win | 4–0 | Carlos Alberto Rojas | Submission (arm-triangle choke) | Jungle Fight 46 | December 13, 2012 | 2 | 0:48 | São Paulo, Brazil | |
| Win | 3–0 | Adilson Fernandes | Submission (guillotine choke) | Jungle Fight 44 | October 27, 2012 | 1 | 0:40 | Rio de Janeiro, Brazil | |
| Win | 2–0 | Kelles Albuquerque | Submission (guillotine choke) | GF - Fight Pavilion Special Edition 2 | July 29, 2012 | 1 | 1:01 | Rio de Janeiro, Brazil | |
| Win | 1–0 | Wallace Oliveira | Submission (rear-naked choke) | Celeiro Combat 3 | April 7, 2011 | 1 | 0:34 | Rio de Janeiro, Brazil | Welterweight debut. |

=== Mixed martial arts exhibition record ===
| Exhibition record breakdown | | |
| 3 matches | 3 wins | 0 losses |
| By knockout | 1 | 0 |
| By submission | 1 | 0 |
| By decision | 1 | 0 |

| Res. | Record | Opponent | Method | Event | Date | Round | Time | Location | Notes |
|---|---|---|---|---|---|---|---|---|---|
| Win | 3–0 | Wagner Silva | Submission (guillotine choke) | The Ultimate Fighter: Brazil 3 | May 18, 2014 (airdate) | 1 | 0:24 | São Paulo, Brazil | The Ultimate Fighter: Brazil 3 semifinal round. |
| Win | 2–0 | Ismael de Jesus | KO (knees) | The Ultimate Fighter: Brazil 3 | May 4, 2014 (airdate) | 1 | N/A | São Paulo, Brazil | The Ultimate Fighter: Brazil 3 preliminary round. |
| Win | 1–0 | Wendell Oliveira | Decision (split) | The Ultimate Fighter: Brazil 3 | March 9, 2014 (airdate) | 3 | 5:00 | São Paulo, Brazil | The Ultimate Fighter: Brazil 3 elimination round. |

== See also ==
- List of male mixed martial artists
