= UFC 309 =

Mixed martial arts event in 2024

UFC 309: Jones vs. Miocic
- The poster for UFC 309: Jones vs. Miocic
- Promotion: Ultimate Fighting Championship
- Date: November 16, 2024
- Venue: Madison Square Garden
- City: New York City, New York, United States
- Attendance: 20,200
- Total gate: $16,673,954

Event chronology
UFC Fight Night: Magny vs. Prates	UFC 309: Jones vs. Miocic	UFC Fight Night: Yan vs. Figueiredo

UFC 309: Jones vs. Miocic was a mixed martial arts event produced by the Ultimate Fighting Championship that took place on November 16, 2024, at Madison Square Garden in New York City, New York, United States.

== Background ==
The event marked the promotion's eleventh visit to New York City and first since UFC 295 in November 2023.

On November 14, it was reported that the UFC had notified fighters competing in upcoming events, including the current one, that the organization will reintroduce its previous glove design, which had been replaced at UFC 302 in June. UFC CEO Dana White cited frequent complaints from fighters over a six-month period.

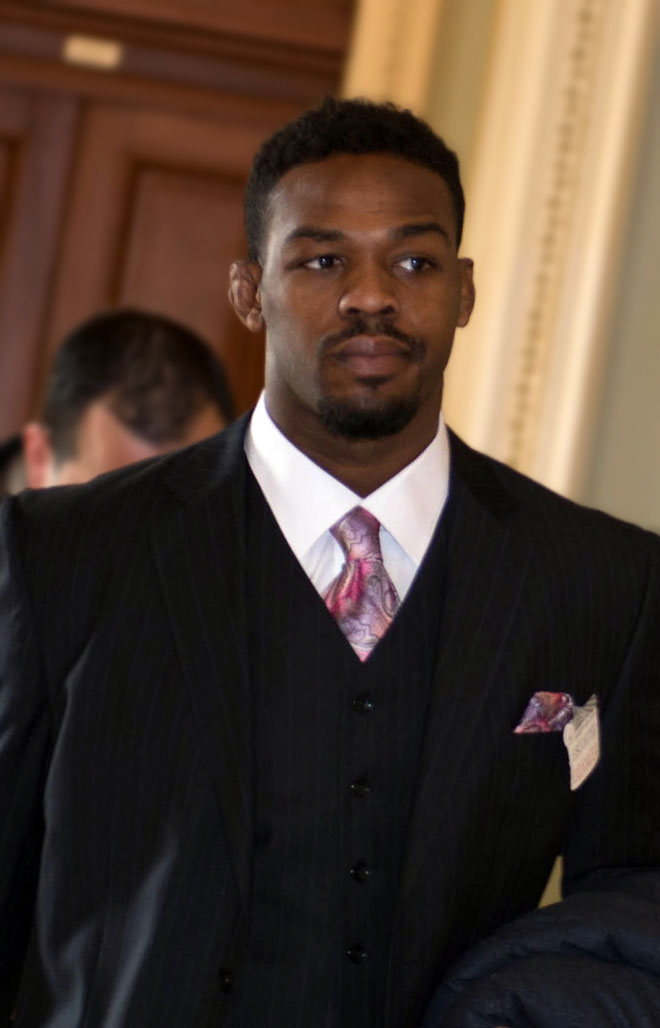
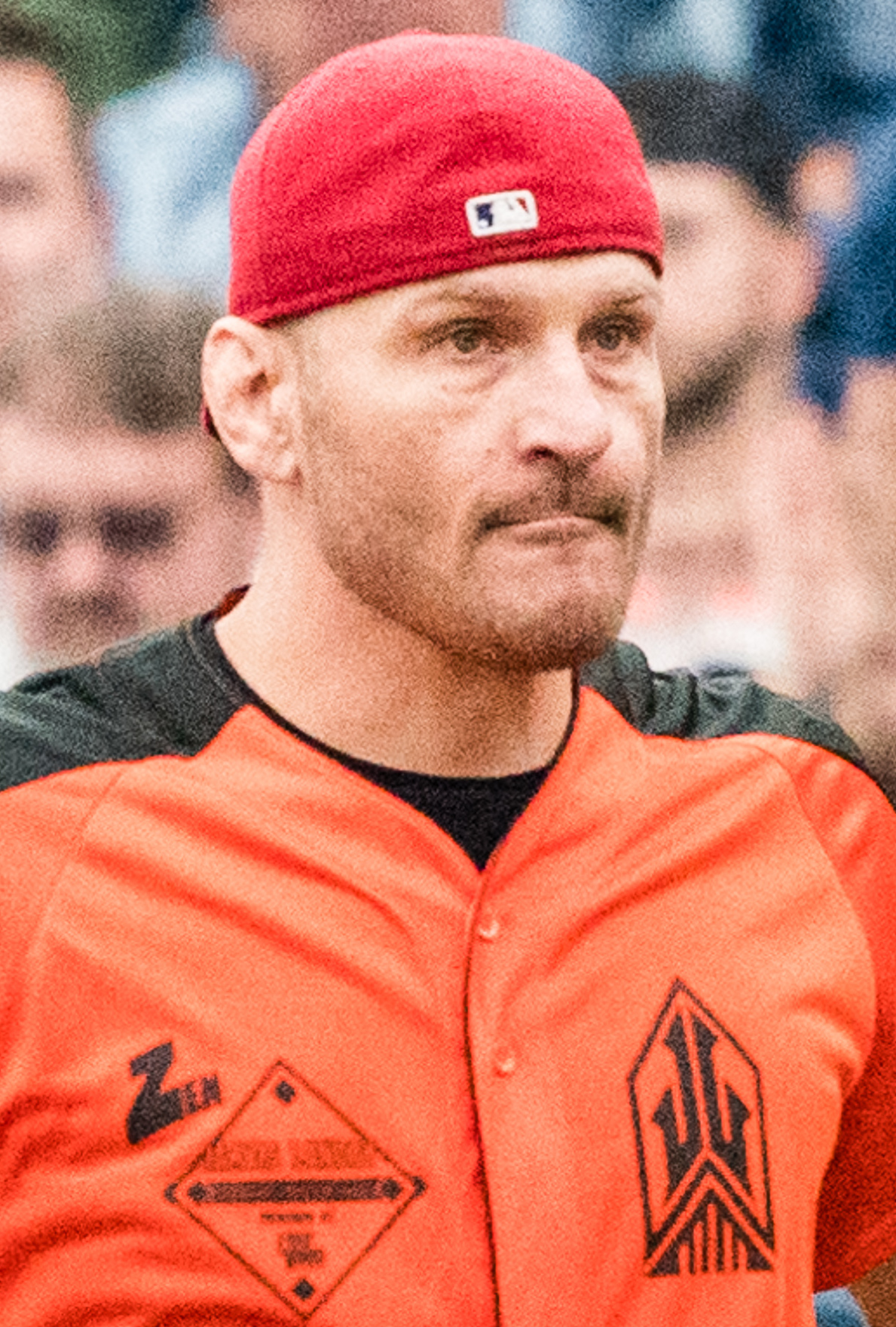
Jones (left) made his first heavyweight title defense. Meanwhile, Miocic (right) made his return after nearly four years and aspired to become just the second man to be a three-time division champion.

A UFC Heavyweight Championship bout between former champion (also a former two-time UFC World Light Heavyweight Champion) Jon Jones and former two-time world champion Stipe Miocic headlined this event. They were previously expected to headline UFC 295 last November, but Jones withdrew due to a pectoral muscle injury. Interim champion at the time and current undisputed champion Tom Aspinall served as backup and potential replacement for this fight.

A five-round lightweight rematch between former UFC World Lightweight Champion Charles Oliveira and former three-time Bellator World Lightweight Champion (also a former UFC world lightweight title challenger) Michael Chandler took place as the co-main event. The pairing previously met for the vacant championship at UFC 262 in May 2021 which Oliveira won by second-round TKO.

A welterweight bout between Randy Brown and Carlos Prates was scheduled for this event. However, Prates ended up being scheduled to headline UFC Fight Night: Magny vs. Prates against Neil Magny a week earlier.

A lightweight bout between Maurício Ruffy and Charlie Campbell was scheduled for this event. However, Campbell withdrew from the fight for unknown reasons and was replaced by James Llontop. The pairing was also changed to a catchweight bout of 165 pounds. Llontop weighed in 1.2 lbs over the 165 lb catchweight limit and was fined 20 percent of his purse, which went to Ruffy.

On November 6, two fighters pulled out of the event: Azamat Murzakanov, who was scheduled to face Nikita Krylov in a light heavyweight bout, withdrew for unknown reasons; and Lucas Almeida, who was expected to face David Onama at featherweight, withdrew due to medical issues. Almeida was replaced by promotional newcomer Roberto Romero in a lightweight bout and no replacement was found for Krylov.

A middleweight bout between former UFC Middleweight Champion Chris Weidman and former LFA Middleweight Champion Eryk Anders was expected to take place at the event. However, Anders withdrew on the day of the event because of food poisoning the night before and the bout was scrapped. The bout was later rescheduled for UFC 310 in a 195 lb catchweight bout.

== Results ==
Main card
Weight class				Method	Round	Time	Notes
Heavyweight	Jon Jones (c)	def.	Stipe Miocic	TKO (spinning back kick and punches)	3	4:29	(Note: For the UFC Heavyweight Championship.)
Lightweight	Charles Oliveira	def.	Michael Chandler	Decision (unanimous) (49–46, 49–46, 49–45)	5	5:00
Middleweight	Bo Nickal	def.	Paul Craig	Decision (unanimous) (30–27, 30–27, 30–27)	3	5:00
Women’s Flyweight	Viviane Araújo	def.	Karine Silva	Decision (unanimous) (29–28, 29–28, 29–28)	3	5:00
Catchweight (166.2 lb)	Maurício Ruffy	def.	James Llontop	Decision (unanimous) (29–28, 29–28, 29–28)	3	5:00
Preliminary card (ESPNews / FX / Hulu / ESPN+)
Bantamweight	Marcus McGhee	def.	Jonathan Martinez	Decision (unanimous) (29–28, 29–28, 29–28)	3	5:00
Lightweight	Jim Miller	def.	Damon Jackson	Submission (guillotine choke)	1	2:44
Lightweight	David Onama	def.	Roberto Romero	Decision (unanimous) (30–27, 30–27, 30–27)	3	5:00
Heavyweight	Marcin Tybura	def.	Jhonata Diniz	TKO (doctor stoppage)	2	5:00
Early preliminary card (ESPN+ / UFC Fight Pass)
Welterweight	Ramiz Brahimaj	def.	Mickey Gall	KO (punches)	1	2:55
Welterweight	Oban Elliott	def.	Bassil Hafez	KO (punches)	3	0:40
Women's Flyweight	Eduarda Moura	def.	Veronica Hardy	Decision (unanimous) (30–27, 29–28, 29–28)	3	5:00

== Bonus awards ==
The following fighters received $50,000 bonuses.

- Fight of the Night: Charles Oliveira vs. Michael Chandler
- Performance of the Night: Jon Jones, Ramiz Brahimaj, and Oban Elliott

== See also ==
- 2024 in UFC
- List of current UFC fighters
- List of UFC events
