= UFC Fight Night: Gaethje vs. Vick =

UFC mixed martial arts event in 2018

- The poster for UFC Fight Night: Gaethje vs. Vick
- Promotion: Ultimate Fighting Championship
- Date: August 25, 2018
- Venue: Pinnacle Bank Arena
- City: Lincoln, Nebraska
- Attendance: 6,409
- Total gate: $478,337

Event chronology
UFC 227: Dillashaw vs. Garbrandt 2	UFC Fight Night: Gaethje vs. Vick	UFC 228: Woodley vs. Till

UFC Fight Night: Gaethje vs. Vick (also known as UFC Fight Night 135) was a mixed martial arts event produced by the Ultimate Fighting Championship that was held on August 25, 2018 at Pinnacle Bank Arena in Lincoln, Nebraska, United States.

== Background ==
The show was the UFC’s third visit to Nebraska, with the previous two events contested in Omaha.

A lightweight bout between former WSOF Lightweight Champion Justin Gaethje and Al Iaquinta was expected to serve as the event headliner. However on June 28, it was announced that Iaquinta withdrew from the bout and was replaced by James Vick.

Bryan Barberena was expected to face Jake Ellenberger at UFC Fight Night: Rivera vs. Moraes. However, Barberena pulled out of the fight citing a leg injury and the bout was scrapped. The pairing was rescheduled for this event.

Alexa Grasso was expected to face former Invicta FC Strawweight Champion Angela Hill at the event, but pulled out on July 19 due to a knee spasm. She was replaced by Cortney Casey.

Antônio Braga Neto was expected to face The Ultimate Fighter: Team Joanna vs. Team Cláudia light heavyweight winner Andrew Sanchez at the event. However, Neto was removed from the bout on August 2 due to undisclosed personal issues and replaced by Markus Perez.

== Results ==
Main card (Fox Sports 1)
Weight class				Method	Round	Time	Notes
Lightweight	Justin Gaethje	def.	James Vick	KO (punch)	1	1:27
Featherweight	Michael Johnson	def.	Andre Fili	Decision (split) (29–28, 27–30, 29–28)	3	5:00
Women's Strawweight	Cortney Casey	def.	Angela Hill	Decision (split) (30–27, 28–29, 29–28)	3	5:00
Welterweight	Bryan Barberena	def.	Jake Ellenberger	TKO (punches)	1	2:26
Flyweight	Deiveson Figueiredo	def.	John Moraga	TKO (punches)	2	3:08
Middleweight	Eryk Anders	def.	Tim Williams	KO (head kick)	3	4:42
Preliminary card (Fox Sports 2)
Welterweight	James Krause	def.	Warlley Alves	KO (knee and punches)	2	2:28
Bantamweight	Cory Sandhagen	def.	Iuri Alcântara	TKO (punches)	2	1:01
Middleweight	Andrew Sanchez	def.	Markus Perez	Decision (unanimous) (29–28, 29–28, 29–28)	3	5:00
Welterweight	Mickey Gall	def.	George Sullivan	Submission (rear-naked choke)	1	1:09
Preliminary card (UFC Fight Pass)
Women's Flyweight	Joanne Calderwood	def.	Kalindra Faria	Submission (triangle armbar)	1	4:57
Lightweight	Drew Dober	def.	Jon Tuck	Decision (unanimous) (30–27, 30–26, 30–26)	3	5:00
Bantamweight	Rani Yahya	def.	Luke Sanders	Submission (heel hook)	1	1:31

== Bonus awards ==
The following fighters received $50,000 bonuses:

- Fight of the Night: Cory Sandhagen vs. Iuri Alcântara
- Performance of the Night: Justin Gaethje and Eryk Anders

== See also ==
- List of UFC events
- 2018 in UFC
- List of current UFC fighters
