= Ramazan Emeev =

Russian mixed martial arts fighter

Ramazan Emeev Рамазан Эмеев
- Born: Ramazan Dadaevich Emeev; May 20, 1987 (age 39); Dylym, Kazbekovsky District, Dagestan ASSR, Russian SFSR, Soviet Union
- Nickname: Gorets
- Nationality: Russian
- Height: 5 ft 10 in (1.78 m)
- Weight: 170 lb (77 kg; 12 st)
- Division: Middleweight; Welterweight (2018–present)
- Reach: 76 in (193 cm)
- Style: Sambo, Freestyle wrestling
- Fighting out of: Makhachkala, Dagestan, Russia
- Team: Gorets MMA; American Top Team
- Rank: International master of sports in Combat Sambo
- Years active: 2009–present

Mixed martial arts record
- Total: 29
- Wins: 23
- By knockout: 3
- By submission: 7
- By decision: 13
- Losses: 6
- By knockout: 2
- By submission: 1
- By decision: 3

Other information
- Mixed martial arts record from Sherdog

Ramazan Dadaevich Emeev (Russian: Рамазан Дадаевич Эмеев; born May 20, 1987) is a Russian mixed martial artist. He is Combat Sambo World Champion who currently fights in the Welterweight division. He is a former M-1 Global middleweight champion and fought in the Ultimate Fighting Championship (UFC).

== Background ==
Ramazan Emeev was born on May 20, 1987, in Dylym village, Kazbekovsky district, Dagestan, Soviet Union in a devout Sunni Muslim family of Avar origin. He started to train in freestyle wrestling at 6 years under Ali Iskhakov. In 2004 he studied in "Dagestan State University of National Economy". In 2005 he joined the MMA club Gorets under Musail Alaudinov and Shamil Alibatyrov. He won the Dagestan national pankration championship 2009 and the world combat sambo title.

== Mixed martial arts career ==
=== M-1 Global ===
At M-1 Global Emeev has a record of 9–1 and was middleweight champion, he beat Bellator MMA veteran Vyacheslav Vasilevsky, Mario Miranda, Luigi Fioravanti, Maiquel Falcao and Anatoly Tokov.

=== Ultimate Fighting Championship ===
Emeev signed his UFC contract on 28 May 2017.

Emeev was expected to face Trevor Smith on October 21, 2017, at UFC Fight Night 118. However, Smith pulled out of the fight on 6 October was replaced by Sam Alvey. At the weigh ins, Alvey missed the middleweight limit of 185 pounds, coming in at 189 pounds. As a result, his bout with Alvey was changed to a catchweight and Alvey was fined 20% of his purse. Emeev won the fight via unanimous decision.

Emeev faced Alberto Mina at welterweight bout on 12 May 2018 at UFC 224. He won the fight via unanimous decision.

Emeev was expected to face Cláudio Silva on September 15, 2018, at UFC Fight Night 136. However, Silva pulled out of the fight in early-September citing a lower back injury. Emeev eventually faced promotional newcomer Stefan Sekulić. He won the fight by unanimous decision with the scoreboard of (30-25, 30-25, 30-25).

Emeev was scheduled to face Michel Prazeres at UFC on ESPN+ 3. However, on February 4, 2019, it was reported that Emeev pulled out of the fight, citing injury.

A bout with Cláudio Silva was rescheduled and was expected to take place on August 3, 2019, at UFC on ESPN 5. In turn, Emeev was removed from this event due to alleged visa issues, that restricted his travel to the United States. He was replaced by promotional newcomer Cole Williams.

Emeev faced Anthony Rocco Martin on November 9, 2019, at UFC on ESPN+ 21. He lost the fight via unanimous decision.

Emeev was scheduled to face Tim Means on February 15, 2020, at UFC Fight Night 167. However, Emeev was removed from the bout in late-January for undisclosed reasons and replaced by Daniel Rodriguez.

Emeev was scheduled to face Shavkat Rakhmonov on July 26, 2020, at UFC on ESPN 14. However, on July 3, 2020, it was reported that Rakhmonov was forced to pull from the bout due to injury and he was replaced by Niklas Stolze. Emeev won the fight via unanimous decision.

Emeev faced David Zawada on January 16, 2021, at UFC on ABC 1. He won a close fight by split decision.

Emeev was scheduled to face Warlley Alves on June 26, 2021, at UFC Fight Night 190. However, Emeev pulled out in mid June due to undisclosed reasons, and he was replaced by promotional newcomer Jeremiah Wells.

Emeev faced Danny Roberts on October 16, 2021, at UFC Fight Night 195. He lost the bout via controversial split decision. 10 out of 12 media outlets scored the bout as a win for Emeev.

Emeev faced Jack Della Maddalena on June 11, 2022, at UFC 275. He lost the fight via TKO in round one.

On August 8, 2022, it was announced that Emeev was no longer on the UFC roster.

=== Absolute Championship Akhmat ===
Emeev would have his first fight outside the UFC over 2 years later at ACA 177 against Vladimir Vasilyev on June 28, 2024. He would win the fight via unanimous decision.

== Championships and accomplishments ==
=== Mixed martial arts ===
- M-1 Global
  - M-1 Challenge Middleweight Championship (twice)

== Mixed martial arts record ==
Professional record breakdown
29 matches	23 wins	6 losses
By knockout	3	2
By submission	7	1
By decision	13	3

Res.	Record	Opponent	Method	Event	Date	Round	Time	Location	Notes
Win	23–6	Artem Frolov	Decision (unanimous)	ACA 199	January 16, 2026	3	5:00	Krasnodar, Russia	
Win	22–6	Abdul-Rakhman Dzhanaev	Decision (unanimous)	ACA 183	February 8, 2025	3	5:00	Krasnodar, Russia	
Win	21–6	Vladimir Vasilyev	Decision (unanimous)	ACA 177	June 28, 2024	3	5:00	Sochi, Russia	Return to Middleweight.
Loss	20–6	Jack Della Maddalena	TKO (punches)	UFC 275	June 11, 2022	1	2:32	Kallang, Singapore	
Loss	20–5	Danny Roberts	Decision (split)	UFC Fight Night: Ladd vs. Dumont	October 16, 2021	3	5:00	Las Vegas, Nevada, United States	
Win	20–4	David Zawada	Decision (split)	UFC on ABC: Holloway vs. Kattar	January 16, 2021	3	5:00	Abu Dhabi, United Arab Emirates	
Win	19–4	Niklas Stolze	Decision (unanimous)	UFC on ESPN: Whittaker vs. Till	July 26, 2020	3	5:00	Abu Dhabi, United Arab Emirates	
Loss	18–4	Anthony Rocco Martin	Decision (unanimous)	UFC Fight Night: Magomedsharipov vs. Kattar	November 9, 2019	3	5:00	Moscow, Russia	
Win	18–3	Stefan Sekulić	Decision (unanimous)	UFC Fight Night: Hunt vs. Oleinik	September 15, 2018	3	5:00	Moscow, Russia	
Win	17–3	Alberto Mina	Decision (unanimous)	UFC 224	May 12, 2018	3	5:00	Rio de Janeiro, Brazil	Return to Welterweight.
Win	16–3	Sam Alvey	Decision (unanimous)	UFC Fight Night: Cowboy vs. Till	October 21, 2017	3	5:00	Gdańsk, Poland	Catchweight (189 lb) bout; Alvey missed weight.
Win	15–3	Anatoly Tokov	Decision (majority)	M-1 Challenge 73	December 9, 2016	3	5:00	Nazran, Russia	
Win	14–3	Maiquel Falcão	Submission (anaconda choke)	M-1 Challenge 65	April 8, 2016	1	2:50	Saint Petersburg, Russia	Defended the M-1 Global Middleweight Championship.
Win	13–3	Luigi Fioravanti	TKO (corner stoppage)	M-1 Challenge 63	December 4, 2015	4	5:00	Saint Petersburg, Russia	Defended the M-1 Global Middleweight Championship.
Win	12–3	Vyacheslav Vasilevsky	Submission (rear-naked choke)	M-1 Challenge 56	April 10, 2015	1	1:48	Moscow, Russia	Won the M-1 Global Middleweight Championship.
Loss	11–3	Vyacheslav Vasilevsky	TKO (punches)	M-1 Challenge 51	September 7, 2014	4	4:34	Saint Petersburg, Russia	Lost the M-1 Global Middleweight Championship.
Win	11–2	Mario Miranda	KO (knee and punches)	M-1 Challenge 38	April 9, 2013	3	0:21	Saint Petersburg, Russia	Defended the M-1 Global Middleweight Championship.
Win	10–2	Mario Miranda	Decision (unanimous)	M-1 Challenge 35	November 15, 2012	5	5:00	Saint Petersburg, Russia	Won the vacant M-1 Global Middleweight Championship.
Win	9–2	Albert Duraev	KO (punches)	M-1 Global: Fedor vs. Rizzo	June 21, 2012	1	1:36	Saint Petersburg, Russia	
Win	8–2	Ruslan Nadzhafaliev	Submission (rear-naked choke)	M-1 Challenge 29	November 19, 2011	2	2:50	Ufa, Russia	
Win	7–2	Murad Magomedov	Decision (unanimous)	M-1 Challenge 25	April 28, 2011	3	5:00	Saint Petersburg, Russia	
Win	6–2	Andrei Ogorodniy	Submission (armbar)	ProFC: Union Nation Cup 13	February 13, 2011	1	1:36	Kharkiv, Ukraine	
Win	5–2	Artur Kadlubek	Decision (unanimous)	ProFC: Union Nation Cup 12	January 22, 2011	2	5:00	Tbilisi, Georgia	
Win	4–2	Denis Gunich	Submission (rear-naked choke)	ProFC: Union Nation Cup 11	December 25, 2010	1	2:30	Nalchik, Russia	
Loss	3–2	Mukhamed Aushev	Decision (unanimous)	ProFC: Union Nation Cup 9	October 22, 2010	2	5:00	Geneva, Switzerland	
Win	3–1	Artem Grishaev	Submission (armbar)	Lipetsk Mixfight Cup 4	September 18, 2010	1	0:23	Lipetsk, Russia	
Win	2–1	Alexei Nazarov	Decision (unanimous)	Warrior Glory 2010	July 17, 2010	3	5:00	Volgograd, Russia	Middleweight debut.
Loss	1–1	Ali Bagov	Submission (triangle choke)	Global Battle 2	October 24, 2009	1	1:30	Perm, Russia	Global Battle Welterweight Tournament Final.
Win	1–0	Maxim Lunegov	Submission (rear-naked choke)	Global Battle 2	October 24, 2009	1	1:47	Perm, Russia	Welterweight debut. Global Battle Welterweight Tournament Semifinal.
