= UFC on Fox: Johnson vs. Bader =

UFC mixed martial arts event in 2016

- The poster for UFC on Fox: Johnson vs. Bader
- Promotion: Ultimate Fighting Championship
- Date: January 30, 2016
- Venue: Prudential Center
- City: Newark, New Jersey
- Attendance: 10,555
- Total gate: $818,000

Event chronology
UFC Fight Night: Dillashaw vs. Cruz	UFC on Fox: Johnson vs. Bader	UFC Fight Night: Hendricks vs. Thompson

UFC on Fox: Johnson vs. Bader (also known as UFC on Fox 18) was a mixed martial arts event held on January 30, 2016, at the Prudential Center in Newark, New Jersey.

== Background ==
The event was headlined by a potential UFC Light Heavyweight Championship title eliminator bout between Anthony Johnson and The Ultimate Fighter: Team Nogueira vs. Team Mir winner Ryan Bader.

A welterweight bout between former Strikeforce Welterweight Champion Tarec Saffiedine and Jake Ellenberger was originally booked as the main event of UFC Fight Night: Saffiedine vs. Lim on January 4, 2014, and later as part of UFC 172 on April 26, 2014. However, the bout was cancelled both times due to Ellenberger having a hamstring injury and Saffiedine pulling out due to an undisclosed injury, respectively. The fight was later rescheduled for this event.

Joaquim Silva was expected to face Olivier Aubin-Mercier at this event. However, on December 23, Silva was forced to pull out due to injury and was replaced by Carlos Diego Ferreira.

Andrew Holbrook was expected to face Sage Northcutt in a lightweight bout at this event. However, on January 22, Holbrook was pulled out of the fight due to injury and was replaced by Bryan Barberena. The bout took place at welterweight.

On March 11, it was announced that Felipe Olivieri was notified of a potential anti-doping policy violation due to a positive test for methyltestosterone stemming from an out-of-competition sample in Brazil, before the event. Oliveiri stated he never used any illegal substance, and will ask for the B-sample to be tested.

== Results ==
Main Card (Fox)
Weight class				Method	Round	Time	Notes
Light Heavyweight	Anthony Johnson	def.	Ryan Bader	KO (punches)	1	1:26
Heavyweight	Ben Rothwell	def.	Josh Barnett	Submission (guillotine choke)	2	3:48
Bantamweight	Jimmie Rivera	def.	Iuri Alcântara	Decision (unanimous) (29–28, 29–28, 29–28)	3	5:00
Welterweight	Bryan Barberena	def.	Sage Northcutt	Submission (arm-triangle choke)	2	3:06
Preliminary Card (Fox Sports 1)
Welterweight	Tarec Saffiedine	def.	Jake Ellenberger	Decision (unanimous) (29–28, 29–28, 29–28)	3	5:00
Lightweight	Carlos Diego Ferreira	def.	Olivier Aubin-Mercier	Decision (unanimous) (29–28, 29–28, 30–27)	3	5:00
Middleweight	Rafael Natal	def.	Kevin Casey	TKO (punches)	3	3:37
Flyweight	Wilson Reis	def.	Dustin Ortiz	Decision (unanimous) (30–27, 30–27, 30–27)	3	5:00
Welterweight	Alexander Yakovlev	def.	George Sullivan	KO (punch)	1	3:59
Featherweight	Alex Caceres	def.	Masio Fullen	Decision (unanimous) (30–27, 30–27, 30–27)	3	5:00
Preliminary Card (UFC Fight Pass)
Welterweight	Randy Brown	def.	Matt Dwyer	Decision (unanimous) (29–28, 29–28, 29–28)	3	5:00
Featherweight	Damon Jackson	vs.	Levan Makashvili	Draw (majority) (29–27, 28–28, 28–28)	3	5:00	(Note: Makashvili was deducted one point in round 3 due to an illegal knee and eye poke.)
Lightweight	Anthony Rocco Martin	def.	Felipe Olivieri	Technical Submission (rear-naked choke)	3	3:02

== Bonus awards ==
The following fighters were awarded $50,000 bonuses:

- Fight of the Night: Jimmie Rivera vs. Iuri Alcântara
- Performance of the Night: Anthony Johnson and Ben Rothwell

== See also ==
- List of UFC events
- 2016 in UFC
