= Salim Touahri =

Polish mixed martial arts fighter

- Born: September 28, 1989 (age 37); Kraków, Poland
- Other names: Grizzly
- Nationality: Polish
- Height: 5 ft 10 in (1.78 m)
- Weight: 170 lb (77 kg; 12 st 2 lb)
- Division: Welterweight
- Reach: 72 in (183 cm)
- Fighting out of: Kraków, Poland
- Team: Grappling Kraków
- Years active: 2010–present

Mixed martial arts record
- Total: 15
- Wins: 11
- By knockout: 7
- By submission: 2
- By decision: 2
- Losses: 4
- By knockout: 1
- By decision: 3

Other information
- Mixed martial arts record from Sherdog

Salim Touahri (born September 28, 1989) is a Polish mixed martial artist who competed in the Welterweight division of the Ultimate Fighting Championship (UFC).

== Mixed martial arts career ==
=== Early career ===
Touahri amassed a professional mixed martial arts record of 10–1 by fighting mainly within the Polish regional MMA circuit as well as once within Russia before signing for the UFC in October 2017.

=== Ultimate Fighting Championship ===
Touahri made his UFC debut as a short-notice opponent against Warlley Alves on October 21, 2017, at UFC Fight Night: Cowboy vs. Till. He lost the fight via unanimous decision.

Touahri was expected to face Brad Scott on 27 May 2018 at UFC Fight Night: Thompson vs. Till. However, Touahri pulled out of the fight citing a knee injury.

Touahri then faced Keita Nakamura on December 1, 2018, at UFC Fight Night: dos Santos vs. Tuivasa. He lost the fight via split decision.

Touahri was expected to face Zelim Imadaev on August 3, 2019, at UFC on ESPN: Covington vs. Lawler. However, on June 9 it was announced that Touahri would face Mickey Gall instead whilst no reason for the change was provided. He lost the fight via unanimous decision.

Touahri was released by the UFC in February 2020.

== Personal life ==
Touahri was arrested in February 2020 on charges alleging his involvement in the trade of illegal substances. He was released without bail in 2021 after the court decided that prosecution's case is based solely on testimonies of a criminal convicted earlier for lying under oath

== Mixed martial arts record ==
Professional record breakdown
14 matches	10 wins	4 losses
By knockout	6	1
By submission	2	0
By decision	2	3

Res.	Record	Opponent	Method	Event	Date	Round	Time	Location	Notes
Win	11–4	Gracjan Szadziński	KO (punch)	Clout MMA 5: AJ Challenge	June 8, 2024	2	1:20	Katowice, Poland	Pride Rules.
Loss	10–4	Mickey Gall	Decision (unanimous)	UFC on ESPN: Covington vs. Lawler	August 3, 2019	3	5:00	Newark, New Jersey, United States	
Loss	10–3	Keita Nakamura	Decision (split)	UFC Fight Night: dos Santos vs. Tuivasa	December 1, 2018	3	5:00	Adelaide, Australia	
Loss	10–2	Warlley Alves	Decision (unanimous)	UFC Fight Night: Cowboy vs. Till	October 21, 2017	3	5:00	Gdańsk, Poland	
Win	10–1	Bayzet Khatkhokhu	KO (punch)	Tech-Krep FC - Prime Selection 2016 Final	October 29, 2016	1	3:11	Krasnodar, Russia	
Win	9–1	Matt Inman	KO (punch to the body)	XCage 9 / PLMMA 65 - Torun	April 9, 2016	1	3:56	Toruń, Poland	
Win	8–1	Tomasz Romanowski	Decision (majority)	XCage 7 / PLMMA 50 - Torun	March 13, 2015	3	5:00	Toruń, Poland	
Win	7–1	Gabor Szabo	TKO (punches)	BoW (KR) - Battle of Warriors 2	April 11, 2014	2	4:56	Kraków, Poland	
Win	6–1	Bartlomiej Ambroziak	TKO (punches)	Soul FC 2 - The Next Battle	February 1, 2014	1	2:50	Zielona Góra, Poland	
Loss	5–1	Pawel Zelazowski	KO (punches)	PLMMA 22 - Black Dragon	October 5, 2013	1	0:28	Andrychów, Poland	For vacant PLMMA Welterweight title
Win	5–0	Radoslaw Domanski	TKO (punches)	SMMA - Superleague of MMA 1	April 3, 2013	1	4:12	Warsaw, Poland	
Win	4–0	Zbigniew Zlobinski	Decision (unanimous)	MMAC 12 - The City of Kings	November 30, 2012	3	3:00	Kraków, Poland	
Win	3–0	Igor Smith	Submission (rear-naked choke)	BB - Bigger's Better	November 16, 2012	1	3:40	Andrychów, Poland	Welterweight debut
Win	2–0	Daniel Tobolik	Submission (arm-triangle choke)	MMAA - MMA Andrychow	June 7, 2012	1	3:19	Andrychów, Poland	Catchweight bout - 181 lbs
Win	1–0	Rafal Kowalski	KO (punch)	Black Dragon - Fight Show	November 20, 2010	1		Andrychów, Poland	Catchweight bout - 176 lbs

== Exhibition Mixed martial arts record ==
Professional record breakdown
1 match	0 wins	0 losses
Draws	1	

Res.	Record	Opponent	Method	Event	Date	Round	Time	Location	Notes
Draw	0–0–1	Mariusz Wach	Draw (no finish)	Silesian MMA 20	February 1, 2025	3	2:00	Będzin, Poland	To win, either fighter needed a finish.

== See also ==
- List of male mixed martial artists
