= Mara Romero Borella =

Italian mixed martial arts fighter

- Born: Maria Chiara; 3 June 1986 (age 40); Ponte dell'Olio, Piacenza, Italy
- Other names: Maravilla
- Nationality: Italian
- Height: 5 ft 6 in (1.68 m)
- Weight: 125 lb (57 kg; 8 st 13 lb)
- Division: Bantamweight; Flyweight
- Reach: 69 in (175 cm)
- Style: Judo, Kickboxing
- Fighting out of: Coconut Creek, Florida, United States
- Team: American Top Team
- Rank: Black belt in Judo; Brown belt in Brazilian Jiu-Jitsu; Black belt in Kickboxing; Black belt in Shoot Boxing
- Years active: 2014–present

Mixed martial arts record
- Total: 22
- Wins: 11
- By knockout: 3
- By submission: 4
- By decision: 4
- Losses: 9
- By knockout: 4
- By submission: 3
- By decision: 2
- No contests: 2

Other information
- Mixed martial arts record from Sherdog

Marachiara Romero Borella (born June 3, 1986) is an Italian professional mixed martial artist who competed in the Women's Flyweight division of the Ultimate Fighting Championship.

== Background ==
Borella taught Judo and was a personal trainer before a friend introduced her to MMA, which started her MMA career. Her father is Italian, and her mother is Honduran.

== Mixed martial arts career ==
=== Early career ===
Borella started her professional MMA career in 2014 and fought primarily in the European circuit. Borella joined Invicta Fighting Championships (Invicta) prior to signing with the UFC in 2017.

=== Invicta Fighting Championships ===
Borella faced Milana Dudieva on July 15, 2017, at FC 24: Dudieva vs. Borella. She won the fight via a split decision with the scoreboard of (30-27, 28-29 29-28).

=== Ultimate Fighting Championship ===
Borella made her UFC debut on October 7, 2017. Borella faced Kalindra Faria at UFC 216 in Las Vegas, United States, replacing Andrea Lee. She won the fight via a submission.

Borella next faced Katlyn Chookagian on January 27, 2018, at UFC on Fox 27. She lost the fight via a unanimous decision.

Borella faced Taila Santos on February 2, 2019, at UFC Fight Night: Assunção vs. Moraes 2. She won the fight by split decision.

Borella faced Lauren Murphy on August 3, 2019, at UFC on ESPN 5. She lost the fight via TKO in the third round.

Borella faced Montana De La Rosa on February 15, 2020, at UFC Fight Night 167. She lost the fight via unanimous decision.

Borella faced Cortney Casey on May 16, 2020, at UFC on ESPN: Overeem vs. Harris. She lost the bout in the first round via submission through an armbar.

Borella was expected to face promotional newcomer Miranda Maverick on June 27, 2020, at UFC on ESPN: Poirier vs. Hooker. However, Maverick was forced to pull out due to injury. In turn, Borella was removed from the card and will be rescheduled for a future event.

Borella faced Mayra Bueno Silva on September 5, 2020, at UFC Fight Night 177. She lost the fight via a submission in round one.

On October 2, 2020, it was reported Borella was released by UFC.

=== Post-UFC career ===
After the release, Borella again signed with the Invicta FC and was scheduled to face Brogan Walker-Sanchez at Invicta FC 44 on August 27, 2021. However, Borella was forced to withdraw from the bout due to visa issues and was replaced by Emilee King.

== Championships and accomplishments ==
=== Mixed martial arts ===
- Kombat League
  - Kombat League Bantamweight Champion (One time)

== Controversies ==
=== Suspension for 26 years for distributing and selling of cocaine ===
Borella was arrested by Italian authorities under "Operation Flanker" for distributing and selling cocaine and cannabis at sporting venues, an operation conducted by the Investigative Unit of the Carabinieri of Piacenza in Emilia and Lombardy. Borella entered into plea deals in 2012 along with 33 defendants where punishments were of up to one and four years in prison. She spent a period in prison and later under house arrest for the incident.

Borella was also suspended by the National Anti Doping Agency of Italy for 15 years for distributing and selling prohibited drugs. The same agency then added an additional 11-year suspension, for a total of 26 years, until 2044, for use of Italian sporting facilities while serving a suspension under the Italian Anti Doping Code article 4.12.3. It was reported on October 19, 2018, that Borella was free to compete in the UFC as the United States Anti-Doping Agency (USADA) UFC anti-doping program does not consider Borella's criminal activity a violation, as it was unrelated to performance enhancement.

== Mixed martial arts record ==
Professional record breakdown
22 matches	11 wins	9 losses
By knockout	3	4
By submission	4	3
By decision	4	2
No contests	2	

Res.	Record	Opponent	Method	Event	Date	Round	Time	Location	Notes
Loss	12–9 (2)	Mayra Bueno Silva	Submission (armbar)	UFC Fight Night: Covington vs. Woodley	September 19, 2020	1	2:29	Las Vegas, Nevada, United States	
Loss	12–8 (2)	Cortney Casey	Submission (armbar)	UFC on ESPN: Overeem vs. Harris	May 16, 2020	1	3:36	Jacksonville, Florida, United States	
Loss	12–7 (2)	Montana De La Rosa	Decision (unanimous)	UFC Fight Night: Anderson vs. Błachowicz 2	February 15, 2020	3	5:00	Rio Rancho, New Mexico, United States	
Loss	12–6 (2)	Lauren Murphy	TKO (knee and elbows)	UFC on ESPN: Covington vs. Lawler	August 3, 2019	3	1:46	Newark, New Jersey, United States	
Win	12–5 (2)	Taila Santos	Decision (split)	UFC Fight Night: Assunção vs. Moraes 2	February 2, 2019	3	5:00	Fortaleza, Brazil	
Loss	11–5 (2)	Katlyn Chookagian	Decision (unanimous)	UFC on Fox: Jacaré vs. Brunson 2	January 27, 2018	3	5:00	Charlotte, North Carolina, United States	
Win	11–4 (2)	Kalindra Faria	Submission (rear-naked choke)	UFC 216	October 7, 2017	1	2:54	Las Vegas, Nevada, United States	
Win	10–4 (2)	Milana Dudieva	Decision (split)	Invicta FC 24: Dudieva vs. Borella	July 15, 2017	3	5:00	Kansas City, Missouri, United States	
Win	9–4 (2)	Iren Racz	Decision (unanimous)	Mushin Fighting 3	February 25, 2017	3	5:00	Nuvolera, Italy	
Win	8–4 (2)	Maria Casanova	Submission (armbar)	Kombat League: Colosseum 4	November 26, 2016	2	2:34	Sassari, Italy	
NC	7–4 (2)	Lena Ovchynnikova	NC (overturned by WMMAF)	WMMAF 2016	May 13, 2016	3	5:00	Lviv, Ukraine	Originally a split decision win for Ovchynnikova; overturned later by WMMAF after review.
Win	7–4 (1)	Suvi Salmimies	Decision (Split)	Cage 34	February 13, 2016	3	5:00	Helsinki, Finland	
Win	6–4 (1)	Lucrezia Ria	Submission (armbar)	Kombat League: Colosseum 3	December 5, 2015	2	3:45	Sardinia, Italy	
Loss	5–4 (1)	Jin Tang	TKO (punches)	Kunlun Fight 33	October 31, 2015	1	4:35	Changde, China	
Loss	5–3 (1)	Stephanie Egger	TKO (corner stoppage)	Arena Fighting Games	October 4, 2015	1	5:00	Milan, Italy	
Loss	5–2 (1)	Anna Elmose	KO (punches)	UCL 23	May 23, 2015	2	0:45	Copenhagen, Denmark	
Win	5–1 (1)	Liubov Tiupina	Submission (armbar)	WMMAF 2015	April 17, 2015	1	1:40	Lviv, Ukraine	
Win	4–1 (1)	Katia Curro	TKO (punches)	Shoot Fighting Championship 16	March 7, 2015	1	4:18	Mazzano, Italy	
NC	3–1 (1)	Donatella Panu	NC (overturned)	FIGMMA: Colosseum MMA in the Cage	December 6, 2014	1	4:00	Sassari, Italy	Originally a submission (armbar) win for Borella; overturned by FIGMMA
Win	3–1	Elena Bondarenko	TKO (punches)	WMMAF 2014	October 18, 2014	2	1:30	Lviv, Ukraine	
Win	2–1	Ileana Bianzeno	Decision (unanimous)	Kombat League: Cage Fight 14	September 13, 2014	3	5:00	Venezia, Italy	
Loss	1–1	Debi Studer	Submission (guillotine choke)	Max Monster 2	April 12, 2014	2	N/A	Sempach, Switzerland	
Win	1–0	Sara Regini	TKO (punches)	Shoot Fighting Championship 12	March 1, 2014	1	1:33	Castiglione delle Stiviere, Italy	

== See also ==
- List of female mixed martial artists
