= Kalindra Faria =

Brazilian mixed martial artist

- Born: Kalindra Walquiri de Carvalho Faria; 23 July 1986 (age 40); Taubaté, São Paulo, Brazil
- Height: 5 ft 5 in (1.65 m)
- Weight: 125 lb (57 kg; 8.9 st)
- Division: Strawweight; Flyweight; Bantamweight
- Reach: 62 in (157 cm)
- Style: Muay Thai, Brazilian jiu-jitsu
- Fighting out of: Taubaté, São Paulo, Brazil
- Team: Macaco Gold Team; Vale Top Team
- Rank: Brown belt in Brazilian Jiu-Jitsu
- Years active: 2009–present

Mixed martial arts record
- Total: 30
- Wins: 19
- By knockout: 7
- By submission: 6
- By decision: 6
- Losses: 10
- By knockout: 1
- By submission: 5
- By decision: 4
- Draws: 1

Other information
- Mixed martial arts record from Sherdog

Kalindra Walquiri de Carvalho Faria (born July 23, 1986) is a Brazilian mixed martial artist, currently completes in the Women's Bantamweight division of the Oktagon MMA. Faria most recently competed in the Ultimate Fighting Championship.

== Mixed martial arts career ==
=== Early career ===
Before joining the UFC, Faria amassed a record of 18–5–1 in fights against fighters such as Cláudia Gadelha, Karolina Kowalkiewicz and Jessica Aguilar.

=== Titan FC ===
In her lone appearance for Titan FC, Faria won the inaugural Titan FC Women's Bantamweight Championship against Carina Damm via unanimous decision.

=== Ultimate Fighting Championship ===
In 2017, Faria was set to make her UFC at UFC 216 against Andrea Lee, however as Lee had previously failed a drugs test, USADA required her to be in the testing pool six months before competing, causing her to pull out. Lee was replaced by fellow promotional newcomer Mara Romero Borella who submitted Faria in the first round.

Faria next faced Jessica Eye at UFC Fight Night: Stephens vs. Choi on January 14, 2018. She lost the back and forth fight by split decision.

Faria then faced Joanne Calderwood on August 25, 2018 at UFC Fight Night 135. She lost the fight via submission in the first round.

In January 2020, it was reported that Faria was released by UFC.

=== Post-UFC career ===
Faria was scheduled to face Sidy Rocha at SFT MMA 21 on February 29, 2020. However, the bout was cancelled due to an unknown reason.

On August 26, 2020, news surfaced that Faria had signed a contract with Taura MMA.

On May 29, 2022, making her first appearance since her UFC release in 2018, Faria won the Brazilian FS Strawweight Championship at Brazilian FS 10, submitting Diná da Silva via rear-naked choke in the first round.

Less than a month later, Faria took on Julia Polastri at Iron Man MMA 24 on June 24, 2022. She lost the bout via unanimous decision.

== Personal life ==
Faria is married to Muay Thai fighter and fellow head coach of Vale Top Team, Cristian Nogueira. In 2007, Faria gave birth to a daughter, Keylane Faria.

== Championships and accomplishments ==
- Titan Fighting Championships
  - Titan FC Women's Bantamweight Championship (one time; first, former)

== Mixed martial arts record ==
Professional record breakdown
31 matches	19 wins	11 losses
By knockout	7	1
By submission	6	5
By decision	6	5
Draws	1	

Res.	Record	Opponent	Method	Event	Date	Round	Time	Location	Notes
Loss	19–11–1	Lucia Szabová	Submission (keylock)	Oktagon 67	February 22, 2025	1	4:16	Třinec, Czech Republic	
Loss	19–10–1	Queila Braga	Decision (unanimous)	Centurion FC 17	January 20, 2024	3	5:00	Rio de Janeiro, Brazil	Return to Bantamweight.
Loss	19–9–1	Julia Polastri	Decision (unanimous)	Iron Man MMA 24	June 24, 2022	3	5:00	Belém, Brazil	
Win	19–8–1	Diná da Silva	Submission (rear-naked choke)	Brazilian Fighting Series 10	May 29, 2022	1	3:16	São Paulo, Brazil	Return to Strawweight. Won the vacant BFS Strawweight Championship.
Loss	18–8–1	Joanne Calderwood	Submission (triangle choke)	UFC Fight Night: Gaethje vs. Vick	August 25, 2018	1	4:57	Lincoln, Nebraska, United States	
Loss	18–7–1	Jessica Eye	Decision (split)	UFC Fight Night: Stephens vs. Choi	January 14, 2018	3	5:00	St. Louis, Missouri, United States	
Loss	18–6–1	Mara Romero Borella	Submission (rear-naked choke)	UFC 216	October 7, 2017	1	2:54	Las Vegas, Nevada, United States	Return to Flyweight.
Win	18–5–1	Carina Damm	Decision (unanimous)	Titan FC 41	September 9, 2016	5	5:00	Coral Gables, Florida, United States	Bantamweight debut. Won the inaugural Titan FC Women's Bantamweight Championship.
Win	17–5–1	Tamires Souza	Submission (armbar)	Battle of Kings 1	December 5, 2015	1	1:10	Ilhéus, Brazil	
Win	16–5–1	Geisa Silva Sena	TKO (punches)	FEMMAESP: Cup 1	October 24, 2015	1	3:07	São Paulo, Brazil	Return to Flyweight.
Loss	15–5–1	Karolina Kowalkiewicz	Decision (split)	KSW 30	February 21, 2015	3	5:00	Poznań, Poland	
Loss	15–4–1	Jessica Aguilar	Decision (unanimous)	WSOF 15	November 15, 2014	5	5:00	Tampa, Florida, United States	For the WSOF Women's Strawweight Championship.
Win	15–3–1	Sanja Sucevic	Decision (unanimous)	XFC International 4	April 26, 2014	3	5:00	Osasco, Brazil	
Win	14–3–1	Laura Balin	Submission (rear-naked choke)	MMA Super Heroes 3	March 30, 2014	2	2:43	São Paulo, Brazil	Won the MMA Super Heroes Women's Strawweight Championship.
Win	13–3–1	Alline Sério	Decision (unanimous)	XFC International 2	March 15, 2014	3	5:00	Osasco, Brazil	Strawweight debut.
Win	12–3–1	Hellen Bastos	TKO (knee and punches)	MMA Super Heroes 2	November 23, 2013	2	4:13	São Paulo, Brazil	Won the MMA Super Heroes Women's Flyweight Tournament.
Win	11–3–1	Carina Damm	Submission (armbar)	MMA Super Heroes 1	July 13, 2013	1	2:05	Louveira, Brazil	MMA Super Heroes Women's Flyweight Tournament Semifinal.
Win	10–3–1	Alessandra Silva	Submission (armbar)	Real Fight 9	June 15, 2013	1	1:34	São José dos Campos, Brazil	
Win	9–3–1	Dayse Santos Nascimento	Submission (armbar)	Detonic Fight 2	May 11, 2013	2	2:31	Ouro Fino, Brazil	
Win	8–3–1	Aline Sattelmayer	TKO (punches)	Detonic Fight 1	February 23, 2013	2	2:19	Monte Sião, Brazil	
Win	7–3–1	Alline Serio	Decision (unanimous)	Pink Fight 2	March 10, 2012	3	5:00	Campos dos Goytacazes, Brazil	
Win	6–3–1	Maria Elisabete Tavares	Decision (unanimous)	Pink Fight 1	January 29, 2012	3	5:00	Porto Seguro, Brazil	
Win	5–3–1	Alessandra Silva	Decision (unanimous)	Vale FC 1	August 6, 2011	3	5:00	Taubaté, Brazil	
Loss	4–3–1	Vanessa Porto	Submission (armbar)	Recife FC 4	March 31, 2011	1	3:57	Recife, Brazil	
Draw	4–2–1	Jennifer Maia	Draw	Power Fight Extreme 4	November 20, 2010	3	5:00	Lorena, Brazil	
Loss	4–2	Cláudia Gadelha	Submission (armbar)	Hard Fight São Paulo 1	September 25, 2010	1	1:10	Piracicaba, Brazil	
Win	4–1	Eloah Ribeiro	TKO (punches)	Stigado: Pro Fight 2010	July 3, 2010	1	3:52	Lorena, Brazil	
Win	3–1	Stefane Pereira	TKO (punches)	Okinawa Fight 2	March 7, 2010	1	2:03	São Lourenço, Brazil	
Loss	2–1	Carina Damm	TKO (corner stoppage)	X-Combat Ultra MMA 1	September 20, 2009	2	1:52	Vitória, Brazil	
Win	2–0	Joana Nardoni	TKO (knees and punches)	Planet Fight 1	June 20, 2009	1	1:26	Pindamonhangaba, Brazil	
Win	1–0	Iris Lopes	TKO (knees and punches)	Okinawa Fight 1	March 8, 2009	3	0:52	São Lourenço, Brazil	Flyweight debut.
