= UFC 216 =

UFC mixed martial arts event in 2017

UFC 216: Ferguson vs. Lee
- The poster for UFC 216: Ferguson vs. Lee
- Promotion: Ultimate Fighting Championship
- Date: October 7, 2017
- Venue: T-Mobile Arena
- City: Paradise, Nevada
- Attendance: 10,638
- Total gate: $677,999.50
- Buyrate: 200,000

Event chronology
UFC Fight Night: Saint Preux vs. Okami	UFC 216: Ferguson vs. Lee	UFC Fight Night: Cowboy vs. Till

UFC 216: Ferguson vs. Lee was a mixed martial arts event produced by the Ultimate Fighting Championship held on October 7, 2017, at T-Mobile Arena in Paradise, Nevada, part of the Las Vegas metropolitan area.

== Background ==
A UFC Heavyweight Championship bout between current champion Stipe Miocic and former two-time champion Cain Velasquez was initially targeted to headline this event. After that pairing failed to materialize, the promotion announced plans for an interim UFC Lightweight Championship bout between The Ultimate Fighter: Team Lesnar vs. Team dos Santos welterweight winner Tony Ferguson and Kevin Lee to serve as the main event.

A UFC Flyweight Championship bout between current champion Demetrious Johnson and Ray Borg was expected to headline UFC 215. However, the fight was canceled a day before the event, as Borg was forced to withdraw from the fight due to illness. His illness was unrelated to his weight cut, sources say. The fight was later rescheduled for this event. If successful, Johnson would have the all-time most consecutive UFC title defenses in any division, with eleven.

Abel Trujillo was expected to face Lando Vannata at the event. However, Trujillo was removed from the card on August 14 for undisclosed reasons and was replaced by Bobby Green.

Paige VanZant was expected to face Jessica Eye at the event. However, VanZant pulled out of the fight on September 25 citing a back injury and the bout was scrapped.

A women's flyweight bout between promotional newcomers Andrea Lee and Kalindra Faria was expected to be a late addition to this event, as it was announced on September 28. However a few hours later, it was revealed that Lee was pulled from the contest as she did not go through the USADA testing pool for six months. Usually short notice fights do not need to follow such rule, but since she has failed a drug test in the past, Lee must fulfill that requirement. She was replaced by fellow promotional newcomer Mara Romero Borella.

A lightweight bout between Nik Lentz and former Bellator Lightweight Champion Will Brooks was slated for the preliminary portion of the card. However the pairing was scrapped during the weigh-ins for the event, as Lentz was stricken with "medical issues" and deemed unfit to compete.

A heavyweight bout between former heavyweight champion Fabrício Werdum and Derrick Lewis was slated for the main card. However, the fight was scrapped the day of the event when Lewis could not move due to back pain from a previous back injury. As a result, Walt Harris, who was originally scheduled to face Mark Godbeer in a preliminary bout, was tabbed as a short-notice opponent for Werdum.

== Results ==
Main Card
Weight class				Method	Round	Time	Notes
Lightweight	Tony Ferguson	def.	Kevin Lee	Submission (triangle choke)	3	4:02	(Note: For the interim UFC Lightweight Championship.)
Flyweight	Demetrious Johnson (c)	def.	Ray Borg	Submission (armbar)	5	3:15	(Note: For the UFC Flyweight Championship.)
Heavyweight	Fabrício Werdum	def.	Walt Harris	Submission (armbar)	1	1:05
Women's Flyweight	Mara Romero Borella	def.	Kalindra Faria	Submission (rear-naked choke)	1	2:54
Lightweight	Beneil Dariush	vs.	Evan Dunham	Draw (majority) (29–28, 28–28, 28–28)	3	5:00
Preliminary Card (FX)
Bantamweight	Cody Stamann	def.	Tom Duquesnoy	Decision (split) (29–28, 28–29, 30–27)	3	5:00
Lightweight	Lando Vannata	vs.	Bobby Green	Draw (split) (29–27, 27–29, 28–28)	3	5:00	(Note: Vannata was deducted one point in round 1 due to an illegal knee.)
Women's Strawweight	Poliana Botelho	def.	Pearl Gonzalez	Decision (unanimous) (30–27, 30–27, 30–27)	3	5:00
Flyweight	Matt Schnell	def.	Marco Beltrán	Decision (unanimous) (30–27, 29–28, 30–27)	3	5:00
Preliminary Card (UFC Fight Pass)
Flyweight	John Moraga	def.	Magomed Bibulatov	KO (punch)	1	1:38
Middleweight	Brad Tavares	def.	Thales Leites	Decision (unanimous) (30–27, 30–26, 30–26)	3	5:00

== Bonus awards ==
The following fighters were awarded $50,000 bonuses:

- Fight of the Night: Lando Vannata vs. Bobby Green
- Performance of the Night: Demetrious Johnson and John Moraga

== Reported payout ==
The following is the reported payout to the fighters as reported to the Nevada State Athletic Commission. It does not include sponsor money and also does not include the UFC's traditional "fight night" bonuses. The total disclosed payout for the event was $2,178,000.

- Tony Ferguson: $500,000 (includes $250,000 win bonus) def. Kevin Lee: $250,000
- Demetrious Johnson: $370,000 (no win bonus) def. Ray Borg: $100,000
- Fabrício Werdum: $400,000 (includes $125,000 win bonus) def. Walt Harris: $28,000
- Mara Romero Borella: $24,000 (includes $12,000 win bonus) def. Kalindra Faria: $12,000
- Beneil Dariush: $48,000 drew with Evan Dunham: $40,000
- Cody Stamann: $24,000 (includes $12,000 win bonus) def. Tom Duquesnoy: $23,000
- Lando Vannata: $25,000 drew with Bobby Green: $24,000
- Poliana Botelho: $20,000 (includes $10,000 win bonus) def. Pearl Gonzalez: $10,000
- Matt Schnell: $20,000 (includes $10,000 win bonus) def. Marco Beltrán: $14,000
- John Moraga: $68,000 (includes $34,000 win bonus) def. Magomed Bibulatov: $17,000
- Brad Tavares: $74,000 (includes $37,000 win bonus) def. Thales Leites: $57,000

Although not included on the NSAC's initial report, Mark Godbeer ($15,000/$15,000) was paid his show purse and a win bonus after he was removed from his scheduled bout with Walt Harris on the day of the event.

== Records set ==
With his win, Johnson broke Anderson Silva's record for most consecutive title defenses (11).

== See also ==
- List of UFC events
- 2017 in UFC
