= Mixed martial arts in Australia =

- Country: Australia
- Governing body: International Mixed Martial Arts Federation of Australia
- National team: Australia

Audience records
- Single match: UFC 243, 57,127, 6 October 2019, Marvel Stadium

Mixed martial arts (MMA) has developed in Australia from a wide cross-section of sporting and martial arts disciplines to become the most popular combat sport in the country.

== History ==
The influence traditional martial arts, Olympic wrestling and Brazilian jiu-jitsu have shaped MMA in Australia, along with the combat sports of Boxing and Kickboxing/Muay Thai.

Between 1905–1914, Australian's witnessed a prizefighting novelty called "All-in" which started with "jiu jitsu" demonstrations and developed into a no-holds barred fighting phenomenon. One of the most notable participants was Sam McVea, an African-American heavyweight boxing champion who would participate in a highly publicised "all-in" fight in Lismore, Australia, against 'Prof.' Stevenson in 1913.

However, the early hybrid didn't last and during most of the 20th century traditional martial arts schools and striking based gyms existed apart as with Amateur wrestling in Australia. Traditional martial arts in general are well attended and feature in the top ten organised sports for children, for both males and females, in Australia.

In the 1990s the three grappling disciplines of BJJ, amateur wrestling and Catch wrestling provided the base for the modern sport. The modern form of MMA came to Australia via the Ultimate Fighting Championship's emergence in 1993. This sport gained an underground following through video and bootleg copies of UFC events in the mid 1990s. However, it was not until early 2000s when the modern MMA became a sport that enjoys worldwide recognition.

The starting of the international expansion of BJJ, through Gracie BJJ schools, was assisted by the success of Royce Gracie at UFC 1-4, but BJJ was first introduced into Australia by John Will in 1989. Initially dedicated Australian practitioners travelled overseas to gain their belts and returned to start schools. Mixed Martial Arts training and gyms began to evolve.

The long history of boxing and the more recent variant of kickboxing/Muay Thai in Australia provided a large injection of fighters with a striking base. The sport of MMA has been described as the fastest growing sport in the twenty first century.

=== Sanctioning ===
States and territories of Australia there are different sanctioning bodies and rules. Sanctioning bodies include: Combat Sports Authority (NSW), Professional Boxing and Combat Sports Board (VC) and Combat Sports Commission of Western Australia (WA).

== Notable fighters (1990s to present) ==
- Alex Chambers – UFC
- Alexander Volkanovski – UFC
- Anthony Perosh – UFC
- Arlene Blencowe – Bellator
- Ashkan Mokhtarian – UFC
- Bec Rawlings – Bellator
- Callan Potter – UFC
- Chris Haseman – UFC
- Damien Brown – UFC
- Dan Kelly – UFC
- Elvis Sinosic – UFC
- George Sotiropoulos – UFC
- Jack Della Maddalena – UFC
- Jake Matthews – UFC
- Jessica–Rose Clark – UFC
- Jimmy Crute – UFC
- Justin Tafa – UFC
- Nadia Kassem – UFC
- Mark Hunt – UFC
- Megan Anderson – UFC
- Peter Graham – Bellator
- Quillan Salkilld - UFC
- Robert Whittaker – UFC
- Rob Wilkinson – PFL
- Steve Erceg – UFC
- Tai Tuivasa – UFC
- Tyson Pedro – UFC

== Promotions ==
=== Ultimate Fighting Championship ===
- UFC 110: Nogueira vs. Velasquez (2010) Sydney
- UFC 127: Penn vs. Fitch (2011) Sydney
- UFC on FX: Alves vs. Kampmann (2012) Sydney
- UFC on FX: Sotiropoulos vs. Pearson (2012) Gold Coast
- UFC Fight Night: Hunt vs. Bigfoot (2013) Brisbane
- UFC Fight Night: Bisping vs. Rockhold (2014) Sydney
- UFC Fight Night: Miocic vs. Hunt (2015) Adelaide
- UFC 193: Rousey vs. Holm (2015) Melbourne
- UFC Fight Night: Hunt vs. Mir (2016) Brisbane
- UFC Fight Night: Whittaker vs. Brunson (2016) Melbourne
- UFC Fight Night: Werdum vs. Tybura (2017) Sydney
- UFC 221: Romero vs. Rockhold (2018) Perth
- UFC Fight Night: dos Santos vs. Tuivasa (2018) Adelaide
- UFC 234: Adesanya vs. Silva (2019) Melbourne
- UFC 243: Whittaker vs. Adesanya (2019) Melbourne
- UFC 284: Makhachev vs. Volkanovski (2023) Perth
- UFC 293: Adesanya vs. Strickland (2023) Sydney
- UFC 305: Du Plessis vs. Adesanya (2024) Perth
- UFC 312: Du Plessis vs. Strickland 2 (2025) Sydney
- UFC 325: Volkanovski vs. Lopes 2 (2026) Sydney

=== Local MMA Promotions ===
- Aftershock MMA – Brisbane, Queensland – Professional and Amateur Fight Promotion
- Australian Fighting Championship – Melbourne, Victoria
- BRACE
- Carnage in the Cage (CITC) – Mackay, Queensland, Australia
- Coastal Combat – Sunshine Coast, Queensland
- Eternal MMA – Gold Coast, Queensland
- Fightworld Cup – Gold Coast, Queensland
- HAMMA Fight Night – Brisbane, Queensland
- Hex Fight Series – Melbourne, VIC
- Minotaur Mixed Martial Arts (Melbourne Fight Club) – Melbourne
- Nitro MMA
- Storm Damage – Australian Capital Territory
- Superfight MMA (Superfight Australia) aka (Mach1FightClub) – New South Wales
- Unarmed Combat Unleashed (UCU) – Emerald, Queensland
- Urban Fight Night – Liverpool, New South Wales
- Winners Circle Fighting Championship (WCFC) - Newcastle, New South Wales
- Wollongong Wars (WW) – Wollongong
- XFC – Australian and New Zealand professional and amateur
- Xtreme Impact Fighting Championships (XIFC) – Toowoomba, Queensland
- Demolition Fight Series – Sunshine, Victoria

==== Past ====
- Cage Fighting Championship (CFC) 2007–2012
- TUFFA MMA 2009–2011
- Impact Fighting Championships (2010)
- Xtreme MMA (XMMA) 2009–2010

==== Amateur MMA Organizations ====
Some may have one or two pro fights but their focus is on AMMY.

- Amateur Cage Fighting Australia (ACFA) – Gold Coast, Queensland, Australia
- International Mixed Martial Arts Federation of Australia

== Reality television ==
- The Ultimate Fighter: The Smashes
- Wimp 2 Warrior
- The Ultimate Fighter Nations: Canada vs. Australia

== Media outlets ==
- Fight News Australia
- Submission Radio
- From The Stands
