= Wrestling in Australia (disambiguation) =

Wrestling in Australia may refer to:

- Professional wrestling in Australia
- Amateur wrestling in Australia
- Wrestling Australia, the organization governing freestyle wrestling and Greco-Roman wrestling in Australia.
