= UFC Fight Night: Błachowicz vs. Santos =

UFC mixed martial arts event in 2019

- The poster for UFC Fight Night: Błachowicz vs. Santos
- Promotion: Ultimate Fighting Championship
- Date: February 23, 2019
- Venue: O_{2} Arena
- City: Prague, Czech Republic
- Attendance: 16,583
- Total gate: $1,606,176

Event chronology
UFC on ESPN: Ngannou vs. Velasquez	UFC Fight Night: Błachowicz vs. Santos	UFC 235: Jones vs. Smith

UFC Fight Night: Błachowicz vs. Santos (also known as UFC Fight Night 145 or UFC on ESPN+ 3) was a mixed martial arts event produced by the Ultimate Fighting Championship that was held on February 23, 2019 at O_{2} Arena in Prague, Czech Republic.

== Background ==
The event marked the promotion's first visit to the Czech Republic, the 23rd country.

A light heavyweight bout between former KSW Light Heavyweight Champion Jan Błachowicz and Thiago Santos served as the event headliner.

Darko Stošić was scheduled to face Magomed Ankalaev at the event. However, Stošić pulled out of the fight on January 23 citing injury. He was replaced by promotional newcomer Klidson Abreu.

Sam Alvey was expected to face Gadzhimurad Antigulov at the event. However on January 25, it was reported that Alvey was chosen as a replacement for another bout at UFC 234 and the bout was scrapped.

Ramazan Emeev was expected to face Michel Prazeres at this event. However on February 4, it was reported that Emeev pulled out of the bout citing injury. He was replaced by promotional newcomer Ismail Naurdiev.

At the weigh-ins, Carlos Diego Ferreira and Klidson Abreu missed the required weight for their respective fights. Ferreira weighed in at 157 pounds, 1 pound over the lightweight non-title fight limit of 156. Meanwhile, Abreu weighed in at 209 pounds, 3 pounds over the light heavyweight non-title fight limit of 206. Both bouts were held at catchweight. Ferreira and Abreu were fined 20% of their purses, which went to their opponents Rustam Khabilov and Magomed Ankalaev.

== Results ==
Main Card (ESPN+)
Weight class				Method	Round	Time	Notes
Light Heavyweight	Thiago Santos	def.	Jan Błachowicz	TKO (punches)	3	0:39
Heavyweight	Stefan Struve	def.	Marcos Rogério de Lima	Submission (arm-triangle choke)	2	2:21
Light Heavyweight	Michał Oleksiejczuk	def.	Gian Villante	TKO (body punch)	1	1:34
Women's Flyweight	Liz Carmouche	def.	Lucie Pudilová	Decision (unanimous) (30–27, 29–28, 29–28)	3	5:00
Bantamweight	Petr Yan	def.	John Dodson	Decision (unanimous) (30–27, 30–27, 30–27)	3	5:00
Catchweight (209 lb)	Magomed Ankalaev	def.	Klidson Abreu	Decision (unanimous) (30–27, 30–27, 29–28)	3	5:00
Preliminary Card (ESPN2)
Welterweight	Dwight Grant	def.	Carlo Pedersoli Jr.	TKO (punches)	1	4:59
Featherweight	Chris Fishgold	def.	Daniel Teymur	Submission (rear-naked choke)	2	1:10	(Note: Teymur was deducted 1 point in round 1 due to grabbing the cage.)
Women's Flyweight	Gillian Robertson	def.	Veronica Macedo	Submission (rear-naked choke)	2	3:27
Lightweight	Damir Hadžović	def.	Polo Reyes	TKO (punches)	2	2:03
Welterweight	Ismail Naurdiev	def.	Michel Prazeres	Decision (unanimous) (30–26, 30–27, 30–27)	3	5:00
Catchweight (157 lb)	Carlos Diego Ferreira	def.	Rustam Khabilov	Decision (unanimous) (30–27, 30–27, 29–28)	3	5:00
Lightweight	Damir Ismagulov	def.	Joel Álvarez	Decision (unanimous) (30–27, 30–27, 30–27)	3	5:00

== Bonus awards ==
The following fighters were awarded $50,000 bonuses:

- Fight of the Night: No bonus awarded.
- Performance of the Night: Thiago Santos, Stefan Struve, Michał Oleksiejczuk, and Dwight Grant

== See also ==
- List of UFC events
- 2019 in UFC
- List of current UFC fighters
