= Kuramagomedov =

Kuramagomedov is a surname. Notable people with the surname include:

- Kuramagomed Kuramagomedov (born 1978), Russian wrestler
- Ramazan Kuramagomedov (born 1996), Russian mixed martial artist
- Zaur Kuramagomedov (born 1988), Russian wrestler
