= UFC 243 =

UFC mixed martial arts event in 2020

UFC 243: Whittaker vs. Adesanya
- The poster for UFC 243: Whittaker vs. Adesanya
- Promotion: Ultimate Fighting Championship
- Date: October 6, 2019
- Venue: Marvel Stadium
- City: Melbourne, Australia
- Attendance: 57,127
- Total gate: $5,470,000

Event chronology
UFC Fight Night: Hermansson vs. Cannonier	UFC 243: Whittaker vs. Adesanya	UFC Fight Night: Joanna vs. Waterson

UFC 243: Whittaker vs. Adesanya was a mixed martial arts pay-per-view event produced by the Ultimate Fighting Championship that took place on October 6, 2019, at Marvel Stadium in Melbourne, Australia.

== Background ==
The event was the fourth that the promotion had contested in Melbourne and second at the venue, following UFC 193 in November 2015.

A UFC Middleweight Championship unification bout between the champion Robert Whittaker (also The Ultimate Fighter: The Smashes welterweight winner) and undefeated interim champion Israel Adesanya served as the event's headliner.

A women's bantamweight bout between former UFC Women's Bantamweight Champion Holly Holm and former title challenger Raquel Pennington was expected to take place at this event. The pairing previously met at UFC 184 in February 2015, when Holm won via split decision in her UFC debut. However, on September 27, it was revealed that Holm withdrew from the bout due to a hamstring injury and the bout was cancelled.

At the weigh-ins, Khalid Taha and Ji Yeon Kim missed the required weight for their respective fights. Taha weighed in at 137 pounds, 1 pound over the bantamweight non-title fight limit of 136. Meanwhile, Kim weighed in at 128 pounds, 2 pounds over the flyweight non-title fight limit of 126. Both bouts were held at catchweight. Taha and Kim were fined 20% and 30% of their purse respectively, which went to their opponents Bruno Gustavo da Silva and Nadia Kassem.

== Results ==
Main Card
Weight class				Method	Round	Time	Notes
Middleweight	Israel Adesanya (ic)	def.	Robert Whittaker (c)	KO (punches)	2	3:33	(Note: For the UFC Middleweight Championship.)
Lightweight	Dan Hooker	def.	Al Iaquinta	Decision (unanimous) (30–27, 30–27, 30–26)	3	5:00
Heavyweight	Serghei Spivac	def.	Tai Tuivasa	Technical Submission (arm-triangle choke)	2	3:14
Welterweight	Dhiego Lima	def.	Luke Jumeau	Decision (split) (28–29, 29–28, 29–28)	3	5:00
Heavyweight	Yorgan De Castro	def.	Justin Tafa	KO (punch)	1	2:10
Preliminary Card (ESPN2)
Welterweight	Jake Matthews	def.	Rostem Akman	Decision (unanimous) (30–27, 30–27, 30–27)	3	5:00
Welterweight	Callan Potter	def.	Maki Pitolo	Decision (unanimous) (29–28, 29–28, 29–28)	3	5:00
Lightweight	Brad Riddell	def.	Jamie Mullarkey	Decision (unanimous) (29–27, 30–26, 30–26)	3	5:00
Women's Featherweight	Megan Anderson	def.	Zarah Fairn dos Santos	Submission (triangle choke)	1	3:57
Early Preliminary Card (UFC Fight Pass)
Catchweight (128 lb)	Ji Yeon Kim	def.	Nadia Kassem	TKO (body punches)	2	4:59
Catchweight (137 lb)	Khalid Taha	vs.	Bruno Gustavo da Silva	No Contest (overturned)	3	3:00	(Note: Originally a Submission (arm-triangle choke) win for Taha; overturned after he tested positive for furosemide.)

== Bonus awards ==
The following fighters received $50,000 bonuses.

- Fight of the Night: Brad Riddell vs. Jamie Mullarkey
- Performance of the Night: Israel Adesanya and Yorgan de Castro

== Records set ==
UFC 243 broke the attendance record for a UFC event with a total of 57,127 people. The previous record (56,214) had been set at the same venue in November 2015 at UFC 193.

== See also ==
- 2019 in UFC
- List of UFC events
- Mixed martial arts in Australia
