= UFC 234 =

UFC mixed martial arts event in 2019

UFC 234: Adesanya vs. Silva
- The poster for UFC 234: Adesanya vs. Silva
- Promotion: Ultimate Fighting Championship
- Date: February 10, 2019
- Venue: Rod Laver Arena
- City: Melbourne, Victoria, Australia
- Attendance: 15,238
- Total gate: $2,470,088
- Buyrate: 175,000

Event chronology
UFC Fight Night: Assunção vs. Moraes 2	UFC 234: Adesanya vs. Silva	UFC on ESPN: Ngannou vs. Velasquez

UFC 234: Adesanya vs. Silva was a mixed martial arts event produced by the Ultimate Fighting Championship that was held on February 10, 2019, at Rod Laver Arena in Melbourne, Victoria, Australia.

== Background ==
A UFC Middleweight Championship bout between former champion Robert Whittaker (also The Ultimate Fighter: The Smashes welterweight winner) and The Ultimate Fighter: Team Jones vs. Team Sonnen middleweight winner Kelvin Gastelum was expected to headline the event. However, Whittaker pulled out of the event a few hours prior due to a hernia and a twisted and collapsed bowel that forced him to undergo emergency surgery later that day. As a result of the last-minute change, the three-round co-main event between Israel Adesanya and former champion Anderson Silva was bumped up to the main event spot.

Ryan Spann was expected to face Jimmy Crute at the event. However, on January 25, it was reported that Spann was forced to pull out due to a hand injury and was replaced by Sam Alvey.

Alex Gorgees was expected to face Jalin Turner at the event. However, it was reported that, on January 27, Gorgees was pulled from the card for an undisclosed reason and he was replaced by Callan Potter.

== Results ==
Main Card
Weight class				Method	Round	Time	Notes
Middleweight	Israel Adesanya	def.	Anderson Silva	Decision (unanimous) (29–28, 30–27, 30–27)	3	5:00
Lightweight	Lando Vannata	def.	Marcos Rosa Mariano	Submission (kimura)	1	4:55
Bantamweight	Ricky Simón	def.	Rani Yahya	Decision (unanimous) (30–27, 30–27, 30–25)	3	5:00
Women's Flyweight	Montana De La Rosa	def.	Nadia Kassem	Submission (armbar)	2	2:37
Light Heavyweight	Jimmy Crute	def.	Sam Alvey	TKO (punches)	1	2:49
Preliminary Card (ESPN)
Lightweight	Devonte Smith	def.	Dong Hyun Ma	TKO (punches)	1	3:49
Featherweight	Shane Young	def.	Austin Arnett	Decision (unanimous) (30–27, 30–27, 30–27)	3	5:00
Flyweight	Kai Kara-France	def.	Raulian Paiva	Decision (split) (28–29, 29–28, 29–28)	3	5:00
Bantamweight	Kang Kyung-ho	def.	Teruto Ishihara	Technical Submission (rear-naked choke)	1	3:59
Early Preliminary Card (UFC Fight Pass)
Lightweight	Jalin Turner	def.	Callan Potter	KO (punches)	1	0:53
Bantamweight	Jonathan Martinez	def.	Wuliji Buren	Decision (unanimous) (30–27, 30–27, 29–28)	3	5:00

== Bonus awards ==
The following fighters were awarded $50,000 bonuses:

- Fight of the Night: Israel Adesanya vs. Anderson Silva
- Performance of the Night: Montana De La Rosa and Devonte Smith

== See also ==
- 2019 in UFC
- List of UFC events
- Mixed martial arts in Australia
