= Dwight Grant =

American mixed martial arts fighter

- Born: Dwight Lamont Grant; September 14, 1984 (age 42); Brooklyn, New York City, United States
- Other names: The Body Snatcher
- Height: 6 ft 1 in (1.85 m)
- Weight: 170 lb (77 kg; 12 st 2 lb)
- Division: Middleweight; Welterweight
- Reach: 78 in (198 cm)
- Fighting out of: San Diego, California, United States
- Team: American Kickboxing Academy (2013–2020); Alliance MMA (2020–present)
- Rank: Purple belt in Brazilian Jiu-Jitsu; Red belt in Kung Fu
- Years active: 2011–present

Mixed martial arts record
- Total: 17
- Wins: 11
- By knockout: 7
- By decision: 4
- Losses: 6
- By knockout: 2
- By decision: 4

Other information
- Mixed martial arts record from Sherdog

Dwight Lamont Grant (born September 14, 1984) is an American mixed martial artist (MMA) who competes in the welterweight division. He had previously fought in the Ultimate Fighting Championship (UFC).

== Background ==
Born and raised in the Bedford-Stuyvesant neighborhood of Brooklyn to parents of Guyanese descent, Grant was a World Kickboxing Association middleweight champion before embarking on a career in MMA.

== Mixed martial arts career ==
=== Early career ===
After amassing an amateur record of 3–1, Grant started his professional MMA career in 2011 and fought primarily on the regional circuit of the northeastern United States. He amassed a record of 8–1 before signed by UFC.

=== Dana White's Tuesday Night Contention Series ===
Grant faced Tyler Hill on June 19, 2018, at Dana White's Contender Series 10. He won the fight via knockout in round two and this win earned him the UFC contract.

=== Ultimate Fighting Championship ===
Two month after the win over Hill, Grant made his promotional debut on 11 day notice, replacing, on June 19, 2018, against Erik Koch at UFC on Fox: Lee vs. Iaquinta 2. However, Koch was removed from the card on November 28 for undisclosed reasons and replaced by Zak Ottow. He lost the fight by split decision.

Grant was scheduled to face Chance Rencountre, replacing Randy Brown, on January 19, 2019, at UFC Fight Night: Cejudo vs. Dillashaw. However, Grant was unable to be cleared to fight due to an "eye issue" and he pulled out from the fight.

Grant was originally scheduled to face Carlo Pedersoli Jr. on February 23, 2019, at UFC Fight Night: Błachowicz vs. Santos. He won the fight via technical knockout in round one. This win earned him the Performance of the Night award.

Grant faced Alan Jouban on April 13, 2019, at UFC 236. He won the fight via split decision.

Grant was expected to face Jared Gooden on August 22, 2020, at UFC on ESPN 15. However, Gooden pulled out of the during the week leading up to the event with an undisclosed injury. Grant instead faced Daniel Rodriguez. After initially nearly finishing Rodriguez, Grant was knocked down multiple times and ultimately lost the fight via knockout in round one.

Grant was scheduled to face Li Jingliang on December 12, 2020, at UFC 256. However, on December 8, 2020, Grant tested positive for COVID-19 during fight week and had to pull out of his welterweight bout against Li.

Grant faced Stefan Sekulić on April 24, 2021, at UFC 261. He won the bout via split decision.

Grant was scheduled to face Gabriel Green on October 23, 2021, at UFC Fight Night 196. However, Green was removed from the pairing on 23 September for undisclosed reasons and replaced by Francisco Trinaldo. Grant lost the fight via split decision.

Grant faced Sergey Khandozhko on April 23, 2022, at UFC Fight Night 205. After both fighters were knocked down multiple times, Grant ultimately lost the fight via technical knockout in the second round. This fight earned him the Fight of the Night award.

Grant faced Dustin Stoltzfus on July 16, 2022 at UFC on ABC 3. He lost the fight via unanimous decision.

In July 2022, it was announced that Grant was no longer on the UFC roster.

== Championships and accomplishments ==
- Ultimate Fighting Championship
  - Performance of the Night (One time) vs. Carlo Pedersoli Jr.
  - Fight of the Night (One time) vs. Sergey Khandozhko

== Mixed martial arts record ==
Professional record breakdown
| 17 matches | 11 wins | 6 losses |
| By knockout | 7 | 2 |
| By decision | 4 | 4 |

| Res. | Record | Opponent | Method | Event | Date | Round | Time | Location | Notes |
|---|---|---|---|---|---|---|---|---|---|
| Loss | 11–6 | Dustin Stoltzfus | Decision (unanimous) | UFC on ABC: Ortega vs. Rodríguez | July 16, 2022 | 3 | 5:00 | Elmont, New York, United States | Return to Middleweight. |
| Loss | 11–5 | Sergey Khandozhko | TKO (punches) | UFC Fight Night: Lemos vs. Andrade | April 23, 2022 | 2 | 4:15 | Las Vegas, Nevada, United States | Fight of the Night. |
| Loss | 11–4 | Francisco Trinaldo | Decision (split) | UFC Fight Night: Costa vs. Vettori | October 23, 2021 | 3 | 5:00 | Las Vegas, Nevada, United States | Trinaldo was deducted 1 point in Round 3 for an eye poke. |
| Win | 11–3 | Stefan Sekulić | Decision (split) | UFC 261 | April 24, 2021 | 3 | 5:00 | Jacksonville, Florida, United States | |
| Loss | 10–3 | Daniel Rodriguez | KO (punches) | UFC on ESPN: Munhoz vs. Edgar | August 22, 2020 | 1 | 2:24 | Las Vegas, Nevada, United States | |
| Win | 10–2 | Alan Jouban | Decision (split) | UFC 236 | April 13, 2019 | 3 | 5:00 | Atlanta, Georgia, United States | |
| Win | 9–2 | Carlo Pedersoli Jr. | TKO (punches) | UFC Fight Night: Błachowicz vs. Santos | February 23, 2019 | 1 | 4:59 | Prague, Czech Republic | Performance of the Night. |
| Loss | 8–2 | Zak Ottow | Decision (split) | UFC on Fox: Lee vs. Iaquinta 2 | December 15, 2018 | 3 | 5:00 | Milwaukee, Wisconsin, United States | |
| Win | 8–1 | Tyler Hill | KO (punches) | Dana White's Contender Series 10 | June 19, 2018 | 2 | 2:08 | Las Vegas, Nevada, United States | |
| Win | 7–1 | Danasabe Mohammed | Decision (unanimous) | Bellator 165 | November 19, 2016 | 3 | 5:00 | San Jose, California, United States | |
| Win | 6–1 | Jordan Williams | KO (punch) | Conquer FC 2 | April 30, 2016 | 1 | 2:47 | Richmond, California, United States | Performance of the Night. Fight of the Night. |
| Win | 5–1 | Adam Corrigan | Decision (unanimous) | Global Knockout 4 | August 29, 2015 | 3 | 5:00 | Jackson, California, United States | |
| Win | 4–1 | Sergio Vasquez | TKO (punches) | Global Knockout 2 | May 21, 2014 | 3 | 5:00 | Jackson, California, United States | |
| Win | 3–1 | Eddie Saldana | TKO (knees) | Reality Fighting: Mohegan Sun | February 25, 2012 | 3 | 1:22 | Uncasville, Connecticut, United States | Welterweight debut. |
| Win | 2–1 | Erik Purcell | TKO (punches) | Reality Fighting: Gonzaga vs. Porter | October 28, 2011 | 1 | 0:14 | Uncasville, Connecticut, United States | |
| Loss | 1–1 | Chase Owens | Decision (unanimous) | PA Cage Fight 8 | June 24, 2011 | 3 | 5:00 | Scranton, Pennsylvania, United States | |
| Win | 1–0 | Jason Ward | KO (punch) | Reality Fighting: Mohegan Sun | May 21, 2011 | 1 | 3:29 | Uncasville, Connecticut, United States | Middleweight debut. |

== See also ==
- List of male mixed martial artists
