= UFC 193 =

UFC mixed martial arts event in 2015

UFC 193: Rousey vs. Holm
- The poster for UFC 193: Rousey vs. Holm
- Promotion: Ultimate Fighting Championship
- Date: November 14, 2015
- Venue: Docklands Stadium
- City: Melbourne, Australia
- Attendance: 56,214
- Total gate: $6,800,000
- Buyrate: 1,100,000

Event chronology
UFC Fight Night: Belfort vs. Henderson 3	UFC 193: Rousey vs. Holm	The Ultimate Fighter Latin America 2 Finale: Magny vs. Gastelum

UFC 193: Rousey vs. Holm was a mixed martial arts event held on November 14, 2015, at Etihad Stadium in Melbourne, Australia. It was the most attended UFC event in the history of the company at the time, with 56,214 people filling the stadium until UFC 243. Although Ronda Rousey was heavily favored to defeat Holly Holm, Holm gave Rousey her first career defeat.

== Background ==
The event was the first that the promotion has held in Melbourne. Docklands Stadium was the third stadium venue to host a UFC event after UFC 129 at the Rogers Centre in Canada and UFC on Fox: Gustafsson vs. Johnson held at Tele2 Arena in Sweden.

The event was initially expected to be headlined by a UFC Welterweight Championship bout between current champion Robbie Lawler and Carlos Condit, a former WEC Welterweight Champion and former interim UFC Welterweight Champion. However, the bout was removed from the event after Lawler suffered a thumb injury stemming back from his high school wrestling career. Subsequently, a UFC Women's Bantamweight Championship bout between then champion Ronda Rousey and former 18-time boxing world champion in three weight classes Holly Holm, originally scheduled for UFC 195, was announced as the new headliner for this event. The Lawler/Condit bout was eventually rescheduled to UFC 195.

Co-featured at the event was a UFC Women's Strawweight Championship bout between current champion Joanna Jędrzejczyk and Valérie Létourneau.

Brazilian fighters William Macario and Ricardo Abreu were expected to face Brendan O'Reilly and Daniel Kelly respectively at the event. However, both fighters pulled out of their bouts in late September citing injury and were replaced by James Moontasri and Steve Montgomery. In turn, O'Reilly pulled out of his bout on 6 November citing an injury and was replaced by promotional newcomer Anton Zafir.

Michael Bisping was expected to face Robert Whittaker at the event. However, Bisping pulled out of the bout on 30 September citing an elbow injury and was replaced by Uriah Hall.

== Rousey vs. Holm fight ==
Ronda Rousey began the Women's Bantamweight bout aggressively. Holly Holm, with her boxing ability, and from her southpaw stance, tagged Rousey repeatedly with her left hand while controlling the distance. Rousey attempted several clinches through the round, including an attempted armbar, but none had a decisive outcome. By the end of the first round, Rousey was bloodied and breathing heavily, with commentators describing the round as the first she had ever lost in her MMA career.

Round two followed a similar pattern to the first, with Rousey trying to close the distance but being unable to, frustrated by Holm's stick and move strategy. Rousey stumbled forward after taking a straight left to her chin, and while rising, Holm connected with a kick to the side of Rousey's neck, knocking her out. Holm pounced on the fallen Rousey, causing referee Herb Dean to end the bout.

MMA website Sherdog called the fight its Upset of the Year for 2015.

== Jędrzejczyk vs. Létourneau fight ==
In round one, both fighters exchanged punches at each other. Jędrzejczyk then attempted a combination via a kick, however Létourneau was able to grab Jędrzejczyk's leg and take her down. Jędrzejczyk also landed a front kick to the face that made Létourneau walk unsteadily for a few seconds. The two fighters continued exchanging shots at one another for the rest of the round.

Just like the first round, both fighters began the second by exchanging numerous punches. Jędrzejczyk attempted a kick on Létourneau, but Létourneau was able to block the kick, allowing her to punch Jędrzejczyk numerous times. Létourneau later had Jędrzejczyk pinned against the cage, however Jędrzejczyk was able to throw numerous elbow strikes at Létourneau. They continued to exchange shots throughout the round, with Jędrzejczyk throwing more combinations towards the end of the round.

In round three, Létourneau began by throwing a combination. Jędrzejczyk then proceeded to throw some leg kicks, as well as front kicks. Létourneau was showing a bit of tiredness at this point, which Jędrzejczyk took advantage of. Jędrzejczyk chopped Létourneau's lead leg. Along with this, both Létourneau's right eye and leg were swelling. The round finished with Jędrzejczyk doing both a combination and a leg kick.

Jędrzejczyk started round four with a left jab on Létourneau. Létourneau fought back, hitting a couple of punches and kicks to the body. Despite this, Jędrzejczyk continued to hit left jabs on Létourneau. Jędrzejczyk hit numerous punches throughout the rest of the round, including numerous combinations towards the end of the round.

In the final round, both fighters went straight at each other. Jędrzejczyk did numerous leg kicks on Létourneau. Létourneau was able to hit more shots on Jędrzejczyk, however, Jędrzejczyk was throwing various different shots.

The judges scored the fight 49–46, 49–46, and 50–45, unanimously in favor of Jędrzejczyk.

== Other fights ==
In a rematch of heavyweights, Mark Hunt finished Antônio Silva via TKO in round one with a right straight that knocked him to his knees and a follow-up left hook.

Kyle Noke defeated Peter Sobotta via TKO in round one of their welterweight bout with a front kick and a flurry of follow up punches.

== Results ==
Main Card
Weight class				Method	Round	Time	Notes
Women's Bantamweight	Holly Holm	def.	Ronda Rousey (c)	KO (head kick and punches)	2	0:59	(Note: For the UFC Women's Bantamweight Championship.)
Women's Strawweight	Joanna Jędrzejczyk (c)	def.	Valérie Létourneau	Decision (unanimous) (49–46, 49–46, 50–45)	5	5:00	(Note: For the UFC Women's Strawweight Championship.)
Heavyweight	Mark Hunt	def.	Antônio Silva	TKO (punches)	1	3:41
Middleweight	Robert Whittaker	def.	Uriah Hall	Decision (unanimous) (30–27, 30–27, 29–28)	3	5:00
Heavyweight	Jared Rosholt	def.	Stefan Struve	Decision (unanimous) (29–28, 29–28, 29–28)	3	5:00
Preliminary Card (Fox Sports 1)
Lightweight	Jake Matthews	def.	Akbarh Arreola	TKO (doctor stoppage)	2	5:00
Welterweight	Kyle Noke	def.	Peter Sobotta	TKO (front kick to the body and punches)	1	2:01
Light Heavyweight	Gian Villante	def.	Anthony Perosh	KO (punch)	1	2:56
Flyweight	Danny Martinez	def.	Richie Vaculik	Decision (unanimous) (30–27, 30–27, 30–27)	3	5:00
Preliminary Card (UFC Fight Pass)
Middleweight	Dan Kelly	def.	Steve Montgomery	Decision (unanimous) (29–28, 29–28, 29–28)	3	5:00
Welterweight	Richard Walsh	def.	Steve Kennedy	Decision (unanimous) (30–27, 30–27, 29–28)	3	5:00
Welterweight	James Moontasri	def.	Anton Zafir	TKO (spinning back kick, spinning back fist and punches)	1	4:36
Flyweight	Ben Nguyen	def.	Ryan Benoit	Submission (rear-naked choke)	1	2:35

== Bonus awards ==
The following fighters were awarded $50,000 bonuses:

- Fight of the Night: Holly Holm vs. Ronda Rousey
- Performance of the Night: Holly Holm and Kyle Noke

== Reactions ==
UFC president Dana White commented on the Rousey vs. Holm fight, stating "This is a fight. This is what happens", then going on to state "All the greats eventually go down one day". White also said that "there will absolutely be a rematch." Joe Rogan, color-commentator for the UFC, stated Holm's win is "by far the biggest upset in UFC history."

== See also ==
- 2015 in UFC
- List of UFC events
- Mixed martial arts in Australia
