= Robert Whittaker (fighter) =

Australian mixed martial artist (born 1990)

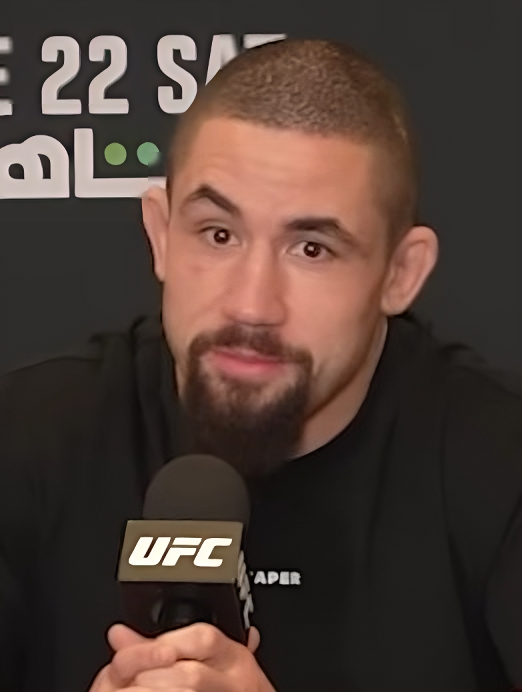
- Whittaker in 2024
- Born: Robert John Whittaker; 20 December 1990 (age 35); Ōtāhuhu, Auckland, New Zealand
- Other names: The Reaper; Bobby Knuckles
- Height: 6 ft 0 in (183 cm)
- Weight: 205 lb (93 kg; 14 st 9 lb)
- Division: Welterweight (2009–2014); Middleweight (2014–2025); Light Heavyweight (2026–present)
- Reach: 73 1/2 in (187 cm)
- Fighting out of: Sydney, New South Wales, Australia
- Team: Tristar Gym (2013–2014); PMA Super Martial Arts; Gracie Jiu Jitsu Smeaton Grange; Stand Strong Boxing
- Teachers: Henry Perez Justin Fitzgerald
- Rank: Black belt in Hapkido; Black belt in Gōjū-ryū Karate; Black belt in Brazilian jiu-jitsu under Alex Prates
- Wrestling: Australian national team for freestyle wrestling
- Years active: 2009–present

Mixed martial arts record
- Total: 36
- Wins: 27
- By knockout: 11
- By submission: 5
- By decision: 11
- Losses: 9
- By knockout: 3
- By submission: 2
- By decision: 4

Other information
- Spouse: Sofia Whittaker
- Website: https://www.robwhittaker.co/
- Mixed martial arts record from Sherdog

Robert John Whittaker (born 20 December 1990) is an Australian professional mixed martial artist. He currently competes in the light heavyweight division of the Ultimate Fighting Championship (UFC), where he is a former UFC Middleweight Champion and the first Australian to win a UFC championship. As of 24 October 2026, he is #11 in the Meta UFC light heavyweight rankings.

A professional since 2009, Whittaker was a contestant on the first series of The Ultimate Fighter: The Smashes and won the welterweight tournament. Whittaker became interim middleweight champion after winning the title at UFC 213; he was promoted to undisputed champion after Georges St-Pierre vacated the UFC Middleweight Championship in 2017.

== Background ==
Whittaker was born at Middlemore Hospital in Ōtāhuhu, Auckland, New Zealand. His father is an Australian of European descent and his mother is of Samoan and Māori ancestry. Moving to Australia shortly after, Whittaker's father enrolled Robert, aged seven, and his brother in a Goju-ryu karate school, to encourage them in self-discipline and self-defence. After training in the discipline for around eight years, and earning his black belt, his father offered him the chance to change to another sport or drop karate entirely. While his brother decided to drop out, Robert chose to switch to a hapkido gym run by Henry Perez, following his move to Menai. Not long afterwards, Perez transformed his gym into an MMA gym. Having no other choice, Whittaker began training in MMA and was immediately hooked, choosing MMA as his preferred sport over rugby league. Whittaker was a talented rugby league player in his younger years and was placed in the development academy of the professional Cronulla Sharks club as a youth.

Whittaker prefers not to engage in trash-talk outside of the octagon:

I'm the type of fighter that goes into every fight with no ill will towards my opponent. I'm an athlete first and foremost and I love the sport.

== Mixed martial arts career ==
=== Early career ===
In 2008, Whittaker signed with Australia's Xtreme Fighting Championships and made his debut 14 March 2009 against fellow pro debutant Chris Tallowin. Whittaker won the fight via TKO in the first round. Whittaker continued his career with Cage Fighting Championships, going 6–0 inside the promotion from 2009 to 2011, with a notable win over fellow TUF: Smashes cast member, Ben Alloway.

On 30 October 2011, Whittaker lost his first fight when he travelled to Cotai, Macau for Legend Fighting Championships 6: he fought Hoon Kim and lost via submission in the first round. Whittaker bounced back from the loss and won two consecutive bouts before suffering his second loss to Jesse Juarez, which brought his overall record to 9–2.

=== Ultimate Fighting Championship ===
==== The Ultimate Fighter ====
In 2012, Whittaker's coach, Henry Perez, put him forward for the first series of The Ultimate Fighter: The Smashes, which pitted a team of eight Australians against a team of eight men from the United Kingdom, and he was selected as one of the cast members.

In his first fight on the show, Whittaker fought Luke Newman. Whittaker landed a punch flush on the chin of Newman after 19 seconds, knocking him unconscious for several minutes. The win moved him onto the semi-final round. The knockout also earned Whittaker an additional $25,000 for "Knockout of the Season".

In the semi-final, Whittaker was matched against replacement fighter and fellow Team Australia teammate, Xavier Lucas. Whittaker won via knockout at 1:17 in the first round. The win moved Whittaker into the final round of the competition, which would take place live on UFC on FX: Sotiropoulos vs. Pearson.

==== Early UFC fights ====
Whittaker made his UFC debut on 15 December 2012 at UFC on FX 6, which was also known as "The Ultimate Fighter: The Smashes Finale". He would fight Brad Scott to determine the welterweight winner of The Ultimate Fighter: The Smashes. Whittaker won the fight via unanimous decision to become the first winner of The Ultimate Fighter: The Smashes alongside Norman Parke, who was the lightweight winner.

Whittaker faced Colton Smith on 25 May 2013 at UFC 160. He won the fight by TKO in the third round.

Whittaker faced Court McGee on 28 August 2013 at UFC Fight Night 27. He lost the fight via split decision.

Whittaker was expected to face Brian Melancon on 7 December 2013 at UFC Fight Night 33. However, Melancon pulled out of the bout citing an injury and subsequently retired. As a result, Whittaker was removed from the card.

Whittaker faced Stephen Thompson on 22 February 2014 at UFC 170. He lost the fight via TKO in the first round.

Whittaker faced Mike Rhodes on 28 June 2014 at UFC Fight Night 43. He won the fight via unanimous decision.

==== Move to middleweight ====
Whittaker faced Clint Hester in a middleweight bout on 8 November 2014 at UFC Fight Night 55. He won the back-and-forth fight via TKO in the second round. The win also earned Whittaker his first Fight of the Night bonus award.

Whittaker faced Brad Tavares on 10 May 2015 at UFC Fight Night 65. He won the fight via knockout in the first round. The win also earned Whittaker his first Performance of the Night bonus award.

Whittaker was expected to face Michael Bisping on 15 November 2015 at UFC 193. However, Bisping pulled out of the fight on 30 September, citing an elbow injury, and was replaced by Uriah Hall. Whittaker defeated Hall by unanimous decision (30–27, 30–27, and 29–28).

Whittaker next faced Rafael Natal on 23 April 2016 at UFC 197. Whittaker won the back and forth fight via unanimous decision.

Whittaker faced Derek Brunson on 27 November 2016 at UFC Fight Night 101. He won the back and forth fight via first-round TKO. The win also earned him the Performance of the Night and the Fight of the Night bonus awards.

Whittaker faced Ronaldo Souza on 15 April 2017 at UFC on Fox 24. He won by second-round TKO and in the process became the first person to finish Souza since 2008. The win also earned Whittaker his third Performance of the Night bonus award.

==== UFC Middleweight Champion ====
Whittaker fought for the interim middleweight title against Yoel Romero on 8 July 2017 at UFC 213, after Michael Bisping announced a nagging knee injury which would go on to keep him on the sidelines for several months. Whittaker won by unanimous decision, and became the first Australian and first New Zealand born fighter to hold a UFC title. This win earned him the Fight of the Night bonus award. He missed the remainder of 2017, as he was recovering from a medial knee injury to his left leg.

On 7 December 2017, then middleweight champion Georges St-Pierre vacated the title after being diagnosed with colitis. As a result, Whittaker was promoted to undisputed champion. He was slated for his first title defence at UFC 221 against former middleweight champion Luke Rockhold on 10 February 2018 at Perth Arena in Australia. On 13 January 2018, it was reported that Whittaker had pulled out of the event due to an undisclosed injury and would be replaced by Yoel Romero for the interim middleweight championship. The winner of this bout would then face Whittaker in a unification bout. On 20 January 2018, Dana White confirmed that Whittaker was in a serious condition after he was not properly treated from a staph infection in his stomach.

A rematch with Romero took place on 9 June 2018 at UFC 225. At the weigh-ins, Romero missed weight, coming in at 186 lbs, 1 pound over the middleweight limit for a title fight. Romero was given additional time to make weight, but he weighed in at 185.2 lbs, 0.2 lbs over the title fight limit. Romero was fined 20% of his fight purse and the fight was contested as a non-title catchweight bout. Whittaker won the fight by a close split decision. Their fight was awarded with 'Fight of The Night' honours. As Romero had failed to make weight, Whittaker received a $100,000 bonus, which would normally have been shared by both fighters.

In July 2018, the UFC announced that Whittaker and Kelvin Gastelum had been selected as coaches for Ultimate Fighter 28. On 2 November 2018, it was announced that Whittaker's next middleweight title defence would be against Kelvin Gastelum, in February at UFC 234. However, Whittaker pulled out of the event a few hours beforehand after he was forced to undergo emergency dual surgery immediately, due to an abdominal hernia of the intestine and a twisted and collapsed bowel.

Whittaker faced interim middleweight champion Israel Adesanya on 6 October 2019 at UFC 243. He lost the bout and the championship via second-round knockout.

==== Post-Middleweight Championship ====
Whittaker was scheduled to face Jared Cannonier on 7 March 2020 at UFC 248. However, on 15 January 2020, it was announced Whittaker pulled out of the bout for undisclosed reasons. In late April 2020, Whittaker revealed in an interview that he withdrew from the bout and training altogether due to burnout.

Whittaker faced Darren Till on 26 July 2020 at UFC on ESPN 14. He won the fight via unanimous decision.

Whittaker faced Jared Cannonier on 24 October 2020 at UFC 254. He won the fight via unanimous decision.

Whittaker was scheduled to face Paulo Costa on 17 April 2021 at UFC on ESPN 22. However, on 16 March Costa withdrew from the fight due to illness, and he was replaced by Kelvin Gastelum. Whittaker won the fight via unanimous decision. This fight earned him the Fight of the Night award.

A rematch between Whittaker and Adesanya for the UFC Middleweight Championship took place on 12 February 2022 at UFC 271. Whittaker lost the bout via unanimous decision.

Whittaker was scheduled to face Marvin Vettori on 11 June 2022 at UFC 275. However, Whittaker withdrew for undisclosed reasons. The pair was rescheduled to meet at UFC Fight Night 209 on 3 September 2022. Whittaker won the fight via unanimous decision.

Whittaker was scheduled to face Paulo Costa on 12 February 2023, at UFC 284. However, Costa disputed the official announcement by the promotion indicating he had never signed a contract and the fight would not take place.

Whittaker faced Dricus du Plessis in a UFC Middleweight title eliminator fight on 8 July 2023, at UFC 290. In an upset, he lost the fight via technical knockout in the second round.

Whittaker faced Paulo Costa on 17 February 2024, at UFC 298. After surviving a head kick at the end of the first round, Whittaker rebounded and won the bout by unanimous decision.

Whittaker was scheduled to face Khamzat Chimaev on 22 June 2024, at UFC on ABC 6. However, Chimaev withdrew due to illness and was replaced by Ikram Aliskerov. He defeated Aliskerov by knockout in the first round. This fight earned him another Performance of the Night award.

Whittaker ended up facing Khamzat Chimaev on 26 October 2024 at UFC 308. He lost the fight via a face-crank submission in the first round resulting in a dislocated jaw.

Whittaker faced former ONE Middleweight and Light Heavyweight World Champion Reinier de Ridder in the main event on 26 July 2025 at UFC on ABC 9. He lost the fight by split decision. 9 out of 16 media outlets scored the bout for de Ridder.

==== Move to light heavyweight ====
Whittaker made his light heavyweight debut against Nikita Krylov on July 11, 2026, at UFC 329. He won the fight by technical knockout in the third round.

Whittaker is scheduled to face Bogdan Guskov on February 7, 2027, at UFC Fight Night 298.

== Freestyle wrestling career ==
Whittaker began competing in freestyle wrestling in 2015, when he unexpectedly entered the Australia Cup in Canberra. He won each of his three bouts. Also at the 2015 Australia Cup, Whittaker flagged the possibility of potentially representing Australia in Olympic or Commonwealth wrestling competitions. He returned to the wrestling mat in May 2017 at the Australian National Wrestling Championships and won the gold medal in the 97 kg (213 lbs) division. After winning the national championship, Whittaker entered Australia's 2018 Commonwealth Games 97 kg qualifying tournament in November 2017. He would once again claim first place in his division and in doing so qualified to represent Australia in the 2018 Commonwealth Games on the Gold Coast, the city in which he made his UFC debut. Following his qualification, Whittaker made it clear he would only compete in the Commonwealth Games if the event did not interfere with his UFC commitments. It was confirmed in March 2018 that Whittaker would be one of eight Australians to compete in the Commonwealth Games wrestling competition in April 2018. However, Whittaker was forced to withdraw from the Games less than three weeks from the event in order not to risk being stripped of his UFC championship title, as the UFC was concerned that an injury incurred during the Commonwealth Games would render him unable to compete for the middleweight championship at UFC 225 against Yoel Romero on 9 June 2018.

== Championships and accomplishments ==
=== General ===
- GQ Australia
  - 2018 Sportsman of the Year

=== Mixed martial arts ===
- Ultimate Fighting Championship
  - UFC Middleweight Championship (One time)
  - Interim UFC Middleweight Championship (One time)
    - First Australian to win a UFC championship
    - First New Zealand-born UFC champion
  - The Ultimate Fighter: The Smashes Welterweight Tournament Winner
    - The Ultimate Fighter: The Smashes Knockout of the Season
  - Fight of the Night (Five times) vs. Clint Hester, Derek Brunson, Yoel Romero (2), and Kelvin Gastelum
  - Performance of the Night (Four times) vs. Brad Tavares, Derek Brunson, Ronaldo Souza and Ikram Aliskerov
    - Second most Post-Fight bonuses in UFC Middleweight division history (9) (behind Anderson Silva)
  - Tied (Yoel Romero & Anthony Hernandez) for fifth longest win streak in UFC Middleweight division history (8)
  - Tied (Anderson Silva & Derek Brunson) for fourth most wins in UFC Middleweight division history (14)
  - Tied for sixth most unanimous decision wins in UFC history (10)
    - Tied (Michael Bisping) for third most decision wins in UFC Middleweight division history (9)
  - Sixth most significant strikes landed in UFC Middleweight division history (1166)
  - UFC.com Awards
    - 2016: Ranked #10 Fight of the Year vs. Derek Brunson
    - 2017: Ranked #4 Fighter of the Year
    - 2018: Fight of the Year vs. Yoel Romero 2
- Superfight Australia
  - SFA Welterweight Championship (one time)
- ESPN
  - 2020 Comeback Fighter of the Year
- MMA Mania
  - UFC/MMA 'Fighter of the Year' 2017 – Top 5 List No. 2
- MMA Junkie
  - 2024 February Fight of the Month vs. Paulo Costa at UFC 298
- Sherdog
  - 2017 Fighter of the Year
- MMA DNA.nl
  - 2017 Fighter of the Year
  - 2018 Fight of the Year vs. Yoel Romero 2 at UFC 225
- BJPENN.COM
  - June 2018 Scrap of the Month vs. Yoel Romero 2 at UFC 225
- World MMA Awards
  - 2017 International Fighter of the Year
- CBS Sports
  - 2017 #4 Ranked UFC Fighter of the Year
  - 2017 #5 Ranked UFC Fight of the Year vs. Yoel Romero at UFC 213
  - 2018 #5 Ranked UFC Fight of the Year vs. Yoel Romero 2 at UFC 225
- Bloody Elbow
  - 2018 Fight of the Year vs. Yoel Romero 2 at UFC 225
- Cageside Press
  - 2018 Fight of the Year vs. Yoel Romero 2 at UFC 225
- Slacky Awards
  - 2017 Technical Turn-Around of the Year

=== Freestyle wrestling ===
- Australia Cup
  - Winner – 97 kg (2015)
- Australian National Wrestling Championships
  - Gold medal – 97 kg (2017)
- Commonwealth Games
  - Qualified – 97 kg (2018)

== Personal life ==
Whittaker and his wife Sofia, who was a gymnast, have three sons and three daughters. Whittaker also has legal guardianship of his younger half-sister and brother.

=== Representing both Australia and New Zealand ===
Whittaker once stated in an interview, "Pretty much all my mother's side is Kiwi and we have a strong Māori heritage." He said further, "I feel really privileged to have that Māori blood and link to my past. I got my tattoo out of respect to that." Whittaker was born in New Zealand and moved to Australia when he was one month old. As stated in an interview, "My mother wanted to have me back home, so she came back. After I was born we came back to Australia. It's half of who I am, is Māori, and my mum's roots go back to Samoa." When asked about his nationality in an interview with the Australian TV programme The Project, he declared that he had an Australian passport but added that he felt as if he represented both countries as an MMA fighter.

I'm blessed to be in this position – every time I walk into the octagon I feel like I'm representing Australia and New Zealand. It's the highest honour and the highest privilege.

In an interview with GQ Australia, he stated:

I am immensely proud to be an Australian and to be a pioneer in the sport to, you know, lead, lead today's MMA scene against all these other countries, you know, it really, it really does light me up, to see that the Australian flag when I walk out, you know, to hear them called out that I'm Australian and I am very patriotic. I am really proud of my country and proud of where I am from.

=== Youth clinics for community service ===
Whittaker has held clinics for youths in his spare time at his home gym, Gracie Jiu Jitsu Smeaton Grange, and also visited several remote Australian Indigenous youth communities at inland New South Wales. Through this community service, he hopes to inspire the younger generation to take up combat sports by being a good role model to them. Whittaker has said "I want to be a good role model for young up-and-coming athletes, and I want to be a role model to men in general. If I could affect a kid, then this whole journey is amazing. To help them to have some sort of a career path in the sport and fitness industry, and if I could do that for one kid even that would make my day."

== Mixed martial arts record ==
Professional record breakdown
36 matches	27 wins	9 losses
By knockout	11	3
By submission	5	2
By decision	11	4

Res.	Record	Opponent	Method	Event	Date	Round	Time	Location	Notes
Win	27–9	Nikita Krylov	TKO (jaw injury)	UFC 329	11 July 2026	3	1:01	Las Vegas, Nevada, United States	Light Heavyweight debut.
Loss	26–9	Reinier de Ridder	Decision (split)	UFC on ABC: Whittaker vs. de Ridder	26 July 2025	5	5:00	Abu Dhabi, United Arab Emirates	
Loss	26–8	Khamzat Chimaev	Submission (face crank)	UFC 308	26 October 2024	1	3:34	Abu Dhabi, United Arab Emirates	
Win	26–7	Ikram Aliskerov	KO (punches)	UFC on ABC: Whittaker vs. Aliskerov	22 June 2024	1	1:49	Riyadh, Saudi Arabia	Performance of the Night.
Win	25–7	Paulo Costa	Decision (unanimous)	UFC 298	17 February 2024	3	5:00	Anaheim, California, United States	
Loss	24–7	Dricus du Plessis	TKO (punches)	UFC 290	8 July 2023	2	2:23	Las Vegas, Nevada, United States	UFC Middleweight title eliminator.
Win	24–6	Marvin Vettori	Decision (unanimous)	UFC Fight Night: Gane vs. Tuivasa	3 September 2022	3	5:00	Paris, France	
Loss	23–6	Israel Adesanya	Decision (unanimous)	UFC 271	12 February 2022	5	5:00	Houston, Texas, United States	For the UFC Middleweight Championship.
Win	23–5	Kelvin Gastelum	Decision (unanimous)	UFC on ESPN: Whittaker vs. Gastelum	17 April 2021	5	5:00	Las Vegas, Nevada, United States	Fight of the Night.
Win	22–5	Jared Cannonier	Decision (unanimous)	UFC 254	24 October 2020	3	5:00	Abu Dhabi, United Arab Emirates	
Win	21–5	Darren Till	Decision (unanimous)	UFC on ESPN: Whittaker vs. Till	26 July 2020	5	5:00	Abu Dhabi, United Arab Emirates	
Loss	20–5	Israel Adesanya	KO (punches)	UFC 243	6 October 2019	2	3:33	Melbourne, Australia	Lost the UFC Middleweight Championship.
Win	20–4	Yoel Romero	Decision (split)	UFC 225	9 June 2018	5	5:00	Chicago, Illinois, United States	Non-title bout; Romero missed weight (185.2 lb). Fight of the Night.
Win	19–4	Yoel Romero	Decision (unanimous)	UFC 213	8 July 2017	5	5:00	Las Vegas, Nevada, United States	Won the interim UFC Middleweight Championship. Fight of the Night. Later promoted to undisputed champion.
Win	18–4	Ronaldo Souza	TKO (head kick and punches)	UFC on Fox: Johnson vs. Reis	15 April 2017	2	3:28	Kansas City, Missouri, United States	Performance of the Night.
Win	17–4	Derek Brunson	TKO (head kick and punches)	UFC Fight Night: Whittaker vs. Brunson	27 November 2016	1	4:07	Melbourne, Australia	Performance of the Night. Fight of the Night.
Win	16–4	Rafael Natal	Decision (unanimous)	UFC 197	23 April 2016	3	5:00	Las Vegas, Nevada, United States	
Win	15–4	Uriah Hall	Decision (unanimous)	UFC 193	15 November 2015	3	5:00	Melbourne, Australia	
Win	14–4	Brad Tavares	KO (punches)	UFC Fight Night: Miocic vs. Hunt	10 May 2015	1	0:44	Adelaide, Australia	Performance of the Night.
Win	13–4	Clint Hester	TKO (knee and punches)	UFC Fight Night: Rockhold vs. Bisping	8 November 2014	2	2:43	Sydney, Australia	Middleweight debut. Fight of the Night.
Win	12–4	Mike Rhodes	Decision (unanimous)	UFC Fight Night: Te Huna vs. Marquardt	28 June 2014	3	5:00	Auckland, New Zealand	
Loss	11–4	Stephen Thompson	TKO (punches)	UFC 170	22 February 2014	1	3:43	Las Vegas, Nevada, United States	
Loss	11–3	Court McGee	Decision (split)	UFC Fight Night: Condit vs. Kampmann 2	28 August 2013	3	5:00	Indianapolis, Indiana, United States	
Win	11–2	Colton Smith	TKO (punches)	UFC 160	25 May 2013	3	0:41	Las Vegas, Nevada, United States	
Win	10–2	Brad Scott	Decision (unanimous)	UFC on FX: Sotiropoulos vs. Pearson	15 December 2012	3	5:00	Gold Coast, Australia	Won The Ultimate Fighter: The Smashes Welterweight Tournament.
Loss	9–2	Jesse Juarez	Decision (unanimous)	Cage FC 21	18 May 2012	5	5:00	Sydney, Australia	For the Cage FC Welterweight Championship.
Win	9–1	Shaun Spooner	TKO (punches)	Superfight Australia 13	23 March 2012	1	4:01	Perth, Australia	Won the SFA Welterweight Championship.
Win	8–1	Ian Bone	TKO (punches)	Cage FC 19	9 December 2011	1	3:15	Sydney, Australia	
Loss	7–1	Kim Hoon	Submission (triangle choke)	Legend FC 6	30 October 2011	1	3:01	Macau, SAR, China	
Win	7–0	Corey Nelson	Submission (armbar)	Cage FC 18	26 August 2011	1	4:40	Sydney, Australia	
Win	6–0	Ben Alloway	Submission (rear-naked choke)	Cage FC 17	3 June 2011	1	4:07	Gold Coast, Australia	
Win	5–0	Nate Thomson	Submission (rear-naked choke)	Cage FC 15	8 October 2010	1	2:21	Sydney, Australia	
Win	4–0	Jay Cobain	Submission (armbar)	Cage FC 14	5 June 2010	1	0:32	Sydney, Australia	
Win	3–0	Nick Ariel	KO (punch)	Cage FC 12	12 March 2010	1	2:50	Sydney, Australia	
Win	2–0	Richard Walsh	Submission (rear-naked choke)	Cage FC 11	20 November 2009	1	2:40	Sydney, Australia	
Win	1–0	Chris Tallowin	TKO (punches)	Xtreme FC: Return of the Hulk	14 March 2009	1	N/A	Perth, Australia	Welterweight debut.

== Mixed martial arts exhibition record ==
Exhibition record breakdown		
2 matches	2 wins	0 losses
By knockout	2	0

Res.	Record	Opponent	Method	Event	Date	Round	Time	Location	Notes
Win	2–0	Xavier Lucas	TKO (punches)	The Ultimate Fighter: The Smashes	28 November 2012 (airdate)	1	1:17	Sydney, Australia	The Ultimate Fighter: The Smashes Semi-final round.
Win	1–0	Luke Newman	KO (punches)	The Ultimate Fighter: The Smashes	3 October 2012 (airdate)	1	0:19	Sydney, Australia	The Ultimate Fighter: The Smashes Quarterfinal round.

== Pay-per-view bouts ==
No.	Event	Fight	Date	Venue	City	PPV Buys
1.	UFC 213	Romero vs. Whittaker	8 July 2017	T-Mobile Arena	Las Vegas, Nevada, United States	150,000
2.	UFC 225	Whittaker vs. Romero 2	9 June 2018	United Center	Chicago, Illinois, United States	250,000
3.	UFC 243	Whittaker vs. Adesanya	6 October 2019	Marvel Stadium	Melbourne, Victoria, Australia	Not Disclosed
4.	UFC 271	Adesanya vs. Whittaker 2	12 February 2022	Toyota Center	Houston, Texas, United States	Not Disclosed

== Filmography ==
=== Web shows ===
Year	Title	Role	Notes	Ref.
2025	Physical: Asia	Contestant	Team Australia	

== See also ==
- List of current UFC fighters
- List of male mixed martial artists

Achievements
New title	1st UFC Interim Middleweight Champion; 8 July 2017 – 7 December 2017; Promoted	Vacant Title next held by Israel Adesanya
Preceded by Georges St-Pierre; Vacated	10th UFC Middleweight Champion; 7 December 2017 – 5 October 2019	Succeeded by Israel Adesanya
