= Brad Scott (fighter) =

English mixed martial arts fighter

Bradley Scott
- Born: Bradley Scott; 22 June 1989 (age 37); Bath, Somerset, England
- Other names: Bear
- Nationality: English
- Height: 6 ft 1 in (1.85 m)
- Weight: 170 lb (77 kg; 12 st 2 lb)
- Division: Middleweight; Welterweight
- Reach: 76 in (193 cm)
- Fighting out of: Melksham, Wiltshire, England
- Team: MMA Lab / Dragonslair MMA
- Years active: 2009–2018

Mixed martial arts record
- Total: 17
- Wins: 11
- By knockout: 5
- By submission: 5
- By decision: 1
- Losses: 6
- By knockout: 1
- By submission: 1
- By decision: 4

Other information
- Mixed martial arts record from Sherdog

Bradley Scott (born 22 June 1989) is a professional bare knuckle fighter and a retired English mixed martial artist who competed in the Welterweight division of the Ultimate Fighting Championship. He currently competes in BYB Bare Knuckle after having formerly fought in BKB where he was their British Cruiserweight champion before the company’s acquisition by BYB.‍ A professional competitor since 2009, he has also competed for Cage Warriors and was a contestant The Ultimate Fighter: The Smashes.

== Mixed martial arts career ==
Scott started his MMA career in 2007 training to become fit and in shape to be a part of the Royal Marines. However, Scott began taking the sport more seriously, even taking a semi-professional fight in his first year of training. Scott lost his only semi-pro fight via submission. Nearly a year and a half later, Scott made his professional debut against Tom Thorneycroft. Scott won the fight via first-round knockout.

In September 2009 Scott won his second pro fight against Steve Obe, again via knockout. One month later Scott had his first professional loss against Eugene Fadiora, after Scott submitted via strikes. Scott went on a 6-0 run after his first loss, winning all six fights via stoppage (3 submissions, 3 knockouts).

=== The Ultimate Fighter ===
In late 2012, Scott signed to be a competitor on The Ultimate Fighter: The Smashes - a regional version of the Ultimate Fighter series, which pitted Australian fighters against British fighters. In his first fight on the show, Scott fought Australian, Xavier Lucas. After a close fight, Scott defeated Lucas via unanimous decision.

For the semi-final rounds Scott was then matched against Australian, Benny Alloway. After three grueling rounds Scott won the fight via split decision. The fight was also awarded "Fight of the Season" by the UFC fans, and both fighters were awarded a $25,000 paycheck.

The win over Alloway moved Scott into the final round of the competition that took place live on UFC on FX: Sotiropoulos vs. Pearson. He faced Robert Whittaker and lost via unanimous decision.

=== Ultimate Fighting Championship ===
Scott made his promotional debut on 15 December 2012 at UFC on FX 6 which was also known as "The Ultimate Fighter: The Smashes Finale". He would fight Robert Whittaker to determine the welterweight winner of The Ultimate Fighter: The Smashes. Scott lost the fight via unanimous decision.

Scott returned to the middleweight division on 26 October 2013 against Michael Kuiper at UFC Fight Night 30. He won the fight via front choke submission in the first round.

Scott faced promotional newcomer Cláudio Silva at UFC Fight Night 37. He lost the back-and-forth fight via unanimous decision.

Scott faced Dylan Andrews on 10 May 2015 at UFC Fight Night 65. Scott won the fight via submission in the second round.

Scott faced Krzysztof Jotko on 27 February 2016 at UFC Fight Night 84. He lost the fight by unanimous decision.

Scott faced Scott Askham on 18 March 2017 at UFC Fight Night 107. He won the fight by split decision.

Scott faced Jack Hermansson on 5 August 2017 at UFC Fight Night 114. He lost the fight via TKO in the first round.

Scott was expected to face Jack Marshman on 17 March 2018 at UFC Fight Night 127. However, Marshman was removed from the card two days before the event for medical issues surrounding his weight cut and his fight with Scott was scrapped.

Scott was scheduled to face Salim Touahri on 27 May 2018 at UFC Fight Night 130. However, Touahri pulled out of the fight in mid-May citing a knee injury. He was replaced by promotional newcomer Carlo Pedersoli Jr. Scott lost the fight via split decision.

On 3 July 2018 UFC was notified by the U.S. Anti-Doping Agency (USADA) Scott of a potential Anti-Doping Policy violation stemming from an in-competition sample collected on 27 May 2018. On 16 October 2018 it was reported that Scott tested positive for benzoylecgonine, a metabolite of cocaine and USADA handed down a two-year suspension for his violation.

Sometime after his suspension, he retired from MMA.

== Championships and accomplishments ==
- Ultimate Fighting Championship
  - The Ultimate Fighter: The Smashes Welterweight Tournament Runner-Up
  - The Ultimate Fighter: The Smashes Fight of the Season (vs. Benny Alloway)

== Mixed martial arts record ==
Professional record breakdown
17 matches	11 wins	6 losses
By knockout	5	1
By submission	5	1
By decision	1	4

Res.	Record	Opponent	Method	Event	Date	Round	Time	Location	Notes
Loss	11–6	Carlo Pedersoli Jr.	Decision (split)	UFC Fight Night: Thompson vs. Till	27 May 2018	3	5:00	Liverpool, England	Welterweight bout.
Loss	11–5	Jack Hermansson	TKO (punches)	UFC Fight Night: Pettis vs. Moreno	5 August 2017	1	3:50	Mexico City, Mexico	
Win	11–4	Scott Askham	Decision (split)	UFC Fight Night: Manuwa vs. Anderson	18 March 2017	3	5:00	London, England	
Loss	10–4	Krzysztof Jotko	Decision (unanimous)	UFC Fight Night: Silva vs. Bisping	27 February 2016	3	5:00	London, England	
Win	10–3	Dylan Andrews	Submission (guillotine choke)	UFC Fight Night: Miocic vs. Hunt	10 May 2015	2	4:54	Adelaide, Australia	
Loss	9–3	Cláudio Silva	Decision (unanimous)	UFC Fight Night: Gustafsson vs. Manuwa	8 March 2014	3	5:00	London, England	
Win	9–2	Michael Kuiper	Submission (standing guillotine choke)	UFC Fight Night: Machida vs. Munoz	26 October 2013	1	4:17	Manchester, England	Return to Middleweight.
Loss	8–2	Robert Whittaker	Decision (unanimous)	UFC on FX: Sotiropoulos vs. Pearson	15 December 2012	3	5:00	Gold Coast, Australia	Lost The Ultimate Fighter: The Smashes Welterweight Tournament.
Win	8–1	Mok Rahman	TKO (punches)	Cage Warriors Fight Night 4	16 March 2012	3	2:45	Dubai, United Arab Emirates	
Win	7–1	Gareth Williams	Submission (rear-naked choke)	Shock n Awe 8	23 July 2011	1	3:16	Portsmouth, England	Welterweight debut.
Win	6–1	David Round	Submission (rear-naked choke)	Spartan Fight Challenge 4	17 July 2010	1	N/A	Nailsea, England	
Win	5–1	Richard Weatherall	TKO (punches)	Spartan Fight Challenge 4	17 July 2010	1	N/A	Nailsea, England	
Win	4–1	Glen Hubbard	KO (punches)	KUMMA: The New Breed 2	24 April 2010	2	3:39	Bath, England	
Win	3–1	Rocci Williams	Submission (rear-naked choke)	Pro Kumite	10 April 2010	1	2:20	Croydon, England	
Loss	2–1	Eugene Fadiora	Submission (punches)	Spartan Fight Challenge 2	10 October 2009	2	N/A	Nailsea, England	
Win	2–0	Steve Obe	KO (punches)	Pro Kumite	19 September 2009	2	0:34	Croydon, England	
Win	1–0	Tom Thorneycroft	KO (punches)	Pro Kumite	21 February 2009	1	3:02	Swindon, England	

== Professional bare knuckle boxing record ==
5 fights	3 wins	1 loss
By knockout	3	1
Draws	1	

No.	Result	Record	Opponent	Type	Round, time	Date	Location	Notes
5	Loss	3–1–1	(Croatia) Marko Martinjak	TKO	1	9 November 2024	(United Kingdom) The Hangar, Wolverhampton, England	For BYB Super Cruiserweight Title
4	Win	3–0–1	(United Kingdom) Martyn Grainger	RTD	2	4 May 2024	(United Kingdom) The O2 Arena, London, England	Won British Cruiserweight Title
3	Draw	2–0–1	(United Kingdom) Kevin Greenwood	MD	5	29 Jul 2023	(United Kingdom) The O2 Arena, London, England	For vacant British Cruiserweight Title
2	Win	2–0	(United Kingdom) Ryan Barrett	TKO	2	26 Mar 2023	(United Kingdom) The O2 Arena, London, England	For vacant BKB British Flyweight Title
1	Win	1–0	(United Kingdom) Andre Lovli	KO	1	3 Dec 2022	(United Kingdom) The O2 Arena, London, England	Bare knuckle debut

== Mixed martial arts exhibition record ==
Professional record breakdown
2 matches	2 wins	0 losses
By knockout	0	0
By submission	0	0
By decision	2	0

Res.	Record	Opponent	Method	Event	Date	Round	Time	Location	Notes
Win	2–0	Benny Alloway	Decision (split)	The Ultimate Fighter: The Smashes	2012	3	5:00	Australia	
Win	1–0	Xavier Lucas	Decision (unanimous)	The Ultimate Fighter: The Smashes	2012	2	5:00	Australia	

== See also ==
- List of male mixed martial artists
