= Zak Ottow =

American mixed martial arts fighter

- Born: Zak Ottow; December 22, 1986 (age 39); Milwaukee, Wisconsin, United States
- Other names: The Barbarian
- Height: 5 ft 11 in (1.80 m)
- Weight: 170 lb (77 kg; 12 st 2 lb)
- Division: Middleweight; Welterweight
- Reach: 72 in (183 cm)
- Style: Brazilian Jiu-Jitsu, Boxing, Taekwondo, Wrestling
- Fighting out of: Milwaukee, Wisconsin, United States
- Team: Pura Vida BJJ (2010–present)
- Rank: Black belt in Brazilian Jiu-Jitsu under Henry Matamoros; Orange belt in Taekwondo
- Years active: 2011–present

Mixed martial arts record
- Total: 28
- Wins: 20
- By knockout: 3
- By submission: 12
- By decision: 5
- Losses: 8
- By knockout: 4
- By submission: 1
- By decision: 3

Other information
- University: University of Wisconsin–Milwaukee
- Mixed martial arts record from Sherdog

Zak Ottow (born December 22, 1986) is an American mixed martial artist who formerly competed in the welterweight division of the Ultimate Fighting Championship (UFC). A professional competitor since 2011, he has also competed for King of the Cage.

== Background ==
Ottow was born and raised in Milwaukee, Wisconsin with an older biological brother and two older stepbrothers. Ottow started training in wrestling and football – becoming an All-State select in latter – while attending Wisconsin Lutheran High School. He attended Air Force Academy in Colorado for two years before transferring to University of Wisconsin in Milwaukee from where he graduated with a degree in kinesiology.

After his college football career had finished, he began training Brazilian jiu-jitsu and later picking up kickboxing. Eventually he started mixed martial arts training and started his professional career not long after. Ottow's typical day of training splits into three sessions. He starts his early morning with strength and conditional training; he works on his wrestling or boxing during the midday, and finishes off his day with BJJ training.

== Mixed martial arts career ==
=== Early career ===
Ottow participated in various regional MMA promotions primarily in the Upper Midwest such as King of the Cage, North American Fighting Championship, and Legacy Fighting Championship. He amassed a record of 13–3 prior to being signed by Ultimate Fighting Championship (UFC).

=== Ultimate Fighting Championship ===
Ottow made his promotional debut on a short notice, replacing Bobby Green against Josh Burkman on October 1, 2016 at UFC Fight Night: Lineker vs. Dodson. He won the fight via split decision.

Ottow faced Sérgio Moraes on November 19, 2016 at UFC Fight Night: Bader vs. Nogueira 2. Moraes was awarded a split decision victory.

Ottow next faced Kiichi Kunimoto on June 11, 2017 at UFC Fight Night: Lewis vs. Hunt. He won the fight via split decision.

Ottow faced Li Jingliang on November 25, 2017 at UFC Fight Night: Silva vs. Gastelum. He lost the fight via TKO in the first round. After the bout Ottow became a free agent having fought his contract out.

Ottow then signed a new four-fight contract to face Mike Pyle on short notice on March 3, 2018 at UFC 222. He won the fight by technical knockout in the first round. Pyle had announced he would retire before the fight.

Ottow faced Sage Northcutt on July 14, 2018 at UFC Fight Night 133. He lost the fight via knock out in round two.

Ottow replaced Erik Koch to face promotional newcomer Dwight Grant on December 15, 2018 at UFC on Fox 31. He won the fight by split decision.

Ottow faced Alex Morono on March 9, 2019 at UFC on ESPN+ 4. He lost the fight via a verbal submission due to elbows in the first round. Having fought out his contract, Ottow became a free agent as the UFC opted not to renew his contract.

=== Post UFC ===
Ottow faced Clarence Jordan at Cages Aggression 29 on November 20, 2020. He won the bout via armbar in the second round.

Ottow faced Jarome Hatch on July 31, 2021 at North Iowa Fights: Hatch vs. Ottow. He won the bout via unanimous decision.

Ottow faced Derek Smith at A-Town Throwdown 17 on January 15, 2022. He won the bout via guillotine choke in the first round.

Ottow faced Kyle Stewart on April 2, 2022 at XMMA 4. He lost the bout via unanimous decision. This was his last professional MMA match.

== Personal life ==
Ottow worked as a bartender and worked in Wall Street for a year before making his career choice to be a professional fighter.

He owns Pura Vida BJJ & MMA.

== Mixed martial arts record ==
Professional record breakdown
28 matches	20 wins	8 losses
By knockout	3	4
By submission	12	1
By decision	5	3

Res.	Record	Opponent	Method	Event	Date	Round	Time	Location	Notes
Loss	20–8	Kyle Stewart	Decision (unanimous)	XMMA 4: Black Magic	April 2, 2022	3	5:00	New Orleans, Louisiana, United States	
Win	20–7	Derek Smith	Submission (guillotine choke)	A-Town Throwdown 17	January 15, 2022	1	2:59	Austin, Minnesota, United States	Catchweight (180 lb) bout.
Win	19–7	Jarome Hatch	Decision (unanimous)	North Iowa Fights: Hatch vs. Ottow	July 31, 2021	3	5:00	Mason City, Iowa, United States	Catchweight (195 lb) bout.
Win	18–7	Clarence Jordan	Submission (armbar)	Caged Aggression 29: Determination Day 1	November 20, 2020	2	2:37	Davenport, Iowa, United States	
Loss	17–7	Alex Morono	TKO (submission to elbows)	UFC Fight Night: Lewis vs. dos Santos	March 9, 2019	1	3:34	Wichita, Kansas, United States	
Win	17–6	Dwight Grant	Decision (split)	UFC on Fox: Lee vs. Iaquinta 2	December 15, 2018	3	5:00	Milwaukee, Wisconsin, United States	
Loss	16–6	Sage Northcutt	KO (punches)	UFC Fight Night: dos Santos vs. Ivanov	July 14, 2018	2	3:13	Boise, Idaho, United States	
Win	16–5	Mike Pyle	TKO (punches)	UFC 222	March 3, 2018	1	2:34	Las Vegas, Nevada, United States	
Loss	15–5	Li Jingliang	TKO (punches)	UFC Fight Night: Bisping vs. Gastelum	November 25, 2017	1	2:57	Shanghai, China	
Win	15–4	Kiichi Kunimoto	Decision (split)	UFC Fight Night: Lewis vs. Hunt	June 10, 2017	3	5:00	Auckland, New Zealand	
Loss	14–4	Sérgio Moraes	Decision (split)	UFC Fight Night: Bader vs. Nogueira 2	November 19, 2016	3	5:00	São Paulo, Brazil	
Win	14–3	Josh Burkman	Decision (split)	UFC Fight Night: Lineker vs. Dodson	October 1, 2016	3	5:00	Portland, Oregon, United States	
Win	13–3	Craig Eckelberg	Decision (unanimous)	Pure FC 4	June 11, 2016	3	5:00	Milwaukee, Wisconsin, United States	
Win	12–3	Frank Schuman	Submission (guillotine choke)	KOTC: Total Devastation	April 23, 2016	3	3:23	Lac Du Flambeau, Wisconsin, United States	
Win	11–3	Jay Ellis	Submission (rear-naked choke)	KOTC: Shattered	March 5, 2016	1	0:26	Keshena, Wisconsin, United States	
Win	10–3	Richard Wolfe	Submission (guillotine choke)	KOTC: Title at the Torch	October 17, 2015	1	1:33	Lac Du Flambeau, Wisconsin, United States	
Loss	9–3	Jacob Volkmann	Technical Submission (brabo choke)	Legacy Fighting Championship 43	July 17, 2015	1	4:55	Hinckley, Minnesota, United States	
Win	9–2	Robbie Gotreau	TKO	KOTC: Public Enemy	February 21, 2015	1	4:27	Carlton, Minnesota, United States	
Win	8–2	Eddie Larrea	Submission (arm-triangle choke)	KOTC: Beastmaster	December 6, 2014	1	1:53	Keshena, Wisconsin, United States	
Win	7–2	Nathan Howe	Submission (arm-triangle choke)	Resurrection Fighting Alliance 19	October 10, 2014	2	0:54	Prior Lake, Minnesota, United States	
Loss	6–2	Zach Micklewright	TKO (punches)	Caged Aggression 12	March 15, 2014	2	1:04	Davenport, Iowa, United States	
Win	6–1	Quinton McCottrell	Submission (rear-naked choke)	NAFC: Battle in the Ballroom	September 28, 2013	2	1:05	Milwaukee, Wisconsin, United States	Welterweight debut.
Win	5–1	Eddie Larrea	Submission (rear-naked choke)	KOTC: Train Wreck	July 2, 2013	1	2:45	Lac Du Flambeau, Wisconsin, United States	
Win	4–1	Matt Gauthier	Submission (arm-triangle choke)	Resurrection Fighting Alliance 8	June 21, 2013	1	3:07	Milwaukee, Wisconsin, United States	Catchweight (175 lbs) bout.
Win	3–1	Jesse Midas	TKO (punches)	Driller Promotions: Caged Chaos	April 27, 2013	1	4:00	Shakopee, Minnesota, United States	
Win	2–1	Ricky Stettner	Submission (choke)	NAFC: Battleground	March 29, 2013	2	2:27	Milwaukee, Wisconsin, United States	Catchweight (180 lbs) bout.
Win	1–1	Jim Klimczyk	TKO (submission to punches)	KOTC: New Vision	February 16, 2013	1	4:37	Morton, Minnesota, United States	
Loss	0–1	Mike Rhodes	Decision (unanimous)	NAFC: Colosseum	May 4, 2012	3	5:00	Milwaukee, Wisconsin, United States	

== See also ==
- List of current UFC fighters
- List of male mixed martial artists
