= Carlo Pedersoli Jr. =

Italian MMA fighter

- Born: June 8, 1993 (age 33); Miami, Florida, U.S.
- Other names: Semento
- Nationality: Italian
- Height: 5 ft 11 in (1.80 m)
- Weight: 77 kg (170 lb; 12 st 2 lb)
- Division: Welterweight
- Reach: 75 in (191 cm)
- Fighting out of: Rome, Italy
- Team: Gloria Fight Center
- Trainer: Lorenzo Borgomeo (head coach); Gioacchino Cimaglia (strength conditioning coach)
- Rank: Purple belt in Brazilian Jiu-Jitsu under Gabriel Marangoni; Brown belt in Kūdō; Brown belt in Karate
- Years active: 2014–present

Mixed martial arts record
- Total: 19
- Wins: 14
- By knockout: 5
- By submission: 5
- By decision: 4
- Losses: 5
- By knockout: 3
- By decision: 2

Other information
- Notable relatives: Bud Spencer (grandfather)
- Mixed martial arts record from Sherdog

Carlo Pedersoli Jr. (born June 8, 1993) is an Italian mixed martial artist and competes in Welterweight division. A professional mixed martial artist since 2014, Pedersoli has also fought in the Ultimate Fighting Championship, Bellator MMA and Cage Warriors.

== Background ==
Pedersoli was born in Miami, Florida, United States to an Italian father (Giuseppe Pedersoli) and a Panamanian mother, and his paternal grandfather is Bud Spencer (Carlo Pedersoli), an Italian actor, Olympic swimmer and professional water polo player. Pedersoli started training goju-ryu and shotokan karate and boxing at young age. At the age of sixteen, he tried a few session of MMA training at his uncle garage, he enrolled himself in MMA and krav maga classes as well as started playing American football in the Roman sport club Grizzleys, helping the club winning Rome championships. After a few successes in MMA fights, he decided to devote himself fully and compete professionally.

== Mixed martial arts career ==
=== Early career ===
Pedersoli fought in the European circuit for three and half years and amassed a record of 10–1, with seven fight winning streak, prior joining UFC.

=== Ultimate Fighting Championship ===
Pedersoli made his promotion debut on May 27, 2018, at UFC Fight Night: Thompson vs. Till against Bradley Scott. He won the fight via split decision.

On September 22, 2018, replacing Santiago Ponzinibbio, Pedersoli faced Alex Oliveira at UFC Fight Night: Santos vs. Anders. He lost the fight via knockout in round one.

Pedersoli faced Dwight Grant on February 23, 2019, at UFC Fight Night 145. He lost the fight via technical knockout in round one.

=== Post UFC ===
After the loss against Dwight Grant, Pedersoli was released from the UFC and subsequently signed by Bellator MMA. He made his debut on October 3, 2020, at Bellator Milan 3 against Acoidan Duque. He lost the back-and-forth fight by unanimous decision.

After winning two bouts on the Italian regional scene in 2021, Pedersoli appeared at Cage Warriors 144 on October 7, 2022 against Madars Fleminas. He won the bout in the second round after reversing Fleminas on the ground and submitting him via rear-naked choke.

Pedersoli returned to Cage Warriors on May 6, 2023 at Cage Warriors 154, taking on Giannis Bachar and losing the bout in the third round via TKO stoppage.

== Personal life ==
Pedersoli studied Sport Science in Rome, Italy.

== Mixed martial arts record ==
Professional record breakdown
19 matches	14 wins	5 losses
By knockout	5	3
By submission	5	0
By decision	4	2

Res.	Record	Opponent	Method	Event	Date	Round	Time	Location	Notes
Loss	14–5	Giannis Bachar	TKO (punches)	Cage Warriors 154	May 6, 2023	3	2:12	Rome, Italy	
Win	14–4	Madars Fleminas	Submission (rear-naked choke)	Cage Warriors 144	October 7, 2022	2	3:37	Rome, Italy	
Win	13–4	Anatoly Safronov	TKO (body kick)	TGC 4	December 4, 2021	1	1:27	Mazara del Vallo, Italy	
Win	12–4	Cristian Corujo	KO (punch)	Messapicum Fighting Championship 4	July 24, 2021	1	0:49	Manduria, Italy	
Loss	11–4	Acoidan Duque	Decision (unanimous)	Bellator Milan 3	October 3, 2020	3	5:00	Milan, Italy	
Loss	11–3	Dwight Grant	TKO (punches)	UFC Fight Night: Błachowicz vs. Santos	February 23, 2019	1	4:59	Prague, Czech Republic	
Loss	11–2	Alex Oliveira	KO (punches)	UFC Fight Night: Santos vs. Anders	September 22, 2018	1	0:39	São Paulo, Brazil	
Win	11–1	Bradley Scott	Decision (split)	UFC Fight Night: Thompson vs. Till	May 27, 2018	3	5:00	Liverpool, England	
Win	10–1	Nicolas Dalby	Decision (split)	Cage Warriors 93	April 28, 2018	3	5:00	Gothenburg, Sweden	
Win	9–1	Mircea Dumitrescu	Submission (arm-triangle choke)	RXF 29: All Stars	December 18, 2017	1	2:39	Brașov, Romania	
Win	8–1	Pavel Pinzul	Submission (rear-naked choke)	Magnum Fighting Championship 2	July 22, 2017	1	2:30	Rome, Italy	
Win	7–1	Matteo Capaccioli	TKO (punches and elbows)	Venator Fight Night 1	May 27, 2017	1	2:25	Rimini, Italy	
Win	6–1	Orlando D'Ambrosio	Submission (guillotine choke)	Magnum Fighting Championship 1	April 8, 2017	2	3:26	Rome, Italy	
Win	5–1	Matúš Juráček	Decision (unanimous)	X Fight Nights	June 12, 2016	3	5:00	Prague, Czech Republic	
Win	4–1	Virgiliu Frăsineac	Decision (unanimous)	Fight or Nothing: Road to Bellator	April 2, 2016	3	5:00	Lugano, Switzerland	
Loss	3–1	Yuki Okano	Decision (split)	Real Fight Championship 3	December 5, 2015	2	5:00	Yokohama, Japan	Lightweight (74 kg) bout.
Win	3–0	Angelo Rubino	Submission (armbar)	Hells Angels Eternal City: 2nd Bikes and Fights Night	July 25, 2015	1	3:51	Rome, Italy	
Win	2–0	Giuseppe Tivolesi	TKO	Storm 9: Pennese vs. Sircu	April 17, 2015	1	1:44	Rome, Italy	
Win	1–0	Gianmarco Romeo	TKO (punches)	White Rex: Tana Delle Tigri 2	May 30, 2014	2	2:10	Rome, Italy	

== See also ==
- List of male mixed martial artists
