= UFC Fight Night: Thompson vs. Till =

UFC mixed martial arts event in 2018

- The poster for UFC Fight Night: Thompson vs. Till
- Promotion: Ultimate Fighting Championship
- Date: May 27, 2018
- Venue: Echo Arena
- City: Liverpool, England
- Attendance: 8,520
- Total gate: $1,300,000

Event chronology
UFC Fight Night: Maia vs. Usman	UFC Fight Night: Thompson vs. Till	UFC Fight Night: Rivera vs. Moraes

UFC Fight Night: Thompson vs. Till (also known as UFC Fight Night 130 or UFC Liverpool) was a mixed martial arts event produced by the UFC that was held on May 27, 2018, at the Echo Arena in Liverpool, England.

== Background ==
The event was initially expected to take place in Dublin. However, at the pre-fight press conference for UFC Fight Night: Werdum vs. Volkov, the promotion indicated that the event would be contested in Liverpool. While the UFC has hosted many events across England, the event was the first contested in Liverpool.

A welterweight bout between former UFC Welterweight Championship challenger Stephen Thompson and Darren Till headlined the event.

A welterweight bout between Neil Magny and Gunnar Nelson was expected to take place at this event. However, on April 28, it was reported that Nelson pulled out of the fight due to a knee injury. On May 15, promotional newcomer Craig White was announced as Magny's new opponent.

Promotional newcomer Don Madge was briefly linked to a bout with David Teymur at the event. However, Madge pulled out of the fight in late April with an undisclosed injury. As a result, Teymur was removed from the card entirely and rescheduled to face Nik Lentz the following week at UFC Fight Night: Rivera vs. Moraes.

Salim Touahri was scheduled to face Brad Scott at the event. However, Touahri pulled out of the fight in mid-May citing a knee injury. He was replaced by promotional newcomer Carlo Pedersoli Jr.

A bantamweight bout between Davey Grant and Manny Bermudez was expected to take place at this event. However, on May 24, it was reported that Grant was diagnosed with a staph infection, and the bout was scrapped.

At the weigh-ins, Darren Till and Molly McCann both missed the required weight for their respective fights. Till weighed in at 174.5 pounds, 3.5 pounds over the welterweight non-title fight limit of 171. After negotiating with Stephen Thompson's team, the bout proceeded at a catchweight with the stipulation that Till couldn't weigh more than 188 pounds on the day of the fight. Also, Till forfeited 30 percent of his purse to Thompson. Meanwhile, McCann weighed in at 127 pounds, 1 pound over the flyweight non-title fight limit of 126. She was fined 20 percent of her purse, which went to her opponent, Gillian Robertson.

== Results ==
Main card (Fox Sports 1)
Weight class				Method	Round	Time	Notes
Catchweight (174.5 lb)	Darren Till	def.	Stephen Thompson	Decision (unanimous) (48–47, 49–46, 49–46)	5	5:00
Welterweight	Neil Magny	def.	Craig White	TKO (knee and punches)	1	4:32
Featherweight	Arnold Allen	def.	Mads Burnell	Submission (guillotine choke)	3	2:41
Featherweight	Makwan Amirkhani	def.	Jason Knight	Decision (split) (27–30, 29–28, 29–28)	3	5:00
Welterweight	Cláudio Silva	def.	Nordine Taleb	Submission (rear-naked choke)	1	4:31
Middleweight	Darren Stewart	def.	Eric Spicely	TKO (punches)	2	1:47
Preliminary card (Fox Sports 1)
Middleweight	Tom Breese	def.	Dan Kelly	TKO (punches)	1	3:33
Women's Bantamweight	Lina Länsberg	def.	Gina Mazany	Decision (unanimous) (30–27, 30–27, 29–28)	3	5:00
Welterweight	Carlo Pedersoli Jr.	def.	Brad Scott	Decision (split) (28–29, 29–28, 29–28)	3	5:00
Catchweight (127 lb)	Gillian Robertson	def.	Molly McCann	Technical Submission (rear-naked choke)	2	2:05
Preliminary card (UFC Fight Pass)
Middleweight	Elias Theodorou	def.	Trevor Smith	Decision (unanimous) (30–27, 30–27, 29–28)	3	5:00

== Bonus awards ==
The following fighters were awarded $50,000 bonuses:

- Fight of the Night: None awarded
- Performance of the Night: Arnold Allen, Cláudio Silva, Darren Stewart, and Tom Breese

== See also ==
- List of UFC events
- 2018 in UFC
