= Jordan Williams (fighter) =

American mixed martial arts fighter

- Born: October 13, 1990 (age 36); Menomonee Falls, Wisconsin, U.S.
- Other names: Bomaye
- Height: 6 ft 1 in (1.85 m)
- Weight: 170 lb (77 kg; 12 st 2 lb)
- Division: Welterweight; Middleweight
- Reach: 75 in (191 cm)
- Fighting out of: Denver, Colorado, U.S.
- Team: Nor-Cal Fighting Alliance; Factory X (2020–present)
- Years active: 2013–present

Mixed martial arts record
- Total: 16
- Wins: 9
- By knockout: 7
- By submission: 1
- By decision: 1
- Losses: 6
- By knockout: 3
- By submission: 1
- By decision: 2
- No contests: 1

Other information
- Mixed martial arts record from Sherdog

Jordan Williams (born October 13, 1990) is an American mixed martial artist who competed in the Welterweight division of the Ultimate Fighting Championship.

== Background ==
Williams started fighting when a friend brought up the idea to him and his full-ride scholarship to UC Davis fell through when they dropped the wrestling program due to lack of funds. In 2010, at Sierra College, he was the California state community college wrestling champion at 197 pounds and All-American. As a 19-year-old college student in the middle of wrestling season, Williams was diagnosed with Type-1 Diabetes, after suddenly losing 20 pounds in 2 weeks. After losing to Kazula Vargas due to a cut, Williams was invited to train with David Terrell, where he has stayed since then.

== Mixed martial arts career ==
=== Early career ===
In his MMA debut at CFFC Nor Cal Conflict, he defeated Sean Choice via TKO in the third round. Williams defeated JC Llamas via unanimous decision at TWC 19 Blackout. He lost to Kazula Vargas At TPF 19 via doctor stoppage due to a cut. At TPF 22 Champions Collide 2, he defeated Christian Barber via TKO in the first round. In his only appearance for West Coast Fighting Championship at WFC 15 Williams knocked out Richard Rigmaden in round one. At Tachi Palace Fights 25 he submitted Preston Scharf in the first round via rear naked choke to earn the first submission victory of his professional career. He would suffer his second loss of his MMA career to future UFC fighter Dwight Grant at Conquer FC 2 after getting knocked out in the first round. Williams would rebound, knocking out Alexander Lopez in the first round at Dragon House 28

In his debut appearance with Bellator MMA at Bellator 199, he defeated Brandon Hester via TKO in the second round to secure his first victory under the Bellator MMA banner.

=== Dana White's Contender Series ===
After racking a 7–2 record in California regional circuit and most lately Bellator, Williams was invited to face Tim Caron at Dana White's Contender Series 11 on June 26, 2018. He won the fight via third-round knockout, but the result was eventually overturned after Williams tested positive for cannabis metabolites. Williams was also fined and suspended for six months, making him eligible to return to competition on December 26, 2018.

After a technical knockout victory against Diego Herzog at Bellator 220, Williams returned to the Contender Series to face Ramazan Kuramagomedov at Dana White's Contender Series 21 on July 23, 2019. He lost the fight via split decision.

He made his third appearance in the series against Gregory Rodrigues at Dana White's Contender Series 33 on September 15, 2020. He won the fight via first-round knockout and was awarded a contract with the UFC.

=== Ultimate Fighting Championship ===
Williams made his promotional debut against Nassourdine Imavov at UFC on ESPN: Holm vs. Aldana on October 4, 2020. He lost the fight via unanimous decision.

==== Return to welterweight ====
He made his sophomore appearance against Mickey Gall at UFC on ESPN: Sandhagen vs. Dillashaw on July 24, 2021. He lost the fight via first-round submission.

Williams faced Ian Garry at UFC 268 on November 6, 2021. He lost the fight via knockout at the end of the first round.

On February 10, 2022, it was announced that Williams was released by the UFC.

== Championships and accomplishments ==
- Dragon House
  - DH Middleweight Championship (One time; former)

== Mixed martial arts record ==
Professional record breakdown
16 matches	9 wins	6 losses
By knockout	7	3
By submission	1	1
By decision	1	2
No contests	1	

Res.	Record	Opponent	Method	Event	Date	Round	Time	Location	Notes
Loss	9–6 (1)	Ian Machado Garry	KO (punches)	UFC 268	November 6, 2021	1	4:59	New York City, New York, United States	
Loss	9–5 (1)	Mickey Gall	Submission (rear-naked choke)	UFC on ESPN: Sandhagen vs. Dillashaw	July 24, 2021	1	2:57	Las Vegas, Nevada, United States	Return to Welterweight.
Loss	9–4 (1)	Nassourdine Imavov	Decision (unanimous)	UFC on ESPN: Holm vs. Aldana	October 4, 2020	3	5:00	Abu Dhabi, United Arab Emirates	
Win	9–3 (1)	Gregory Rodrigues	KO (punches)	Dana White's Contender Series 33	September 15, 2020	1	2:19	Las Vegas, Nevada, United States	
Loss	8–3 (1)	Ramazan Kuramagomedov	Decision (split)	Dana White's Contender Series 21	July 23, 2019	3	5:00	Las Vegas, Nevada, United States	
Win	8–2 (1)	Diego Herzog	TKO (punches)	Bellator 220	April 27, 2019	3	1:21	San Jose, California, United States	
NC	7–2 (1)	Tim Caron	NC (overturned)	Dana White's Contender Series 11	June 26, 2018	3	3:37	Las Vegas, Nevada, United States	Originally a TKO (elbows) win for Williams, overturned after he tested positive for cannabis metabolites.
Win	7–2	Brandon Hester	TKO (punches)	Bellator 199	May 12, 2018	2	1:11	San Jose, California, United States	
Win	6–2	Alex Lopez	KO (punch)	Dragon House 28	March 24, 2018	1	0:24	San Francisco, California, United States	Middleweight debut. Won the vacant DH Middleweight Championship.
Loss	5–2	Dwight Grant	KO (punch)	Conquer FC 2	April 30, 2016	1	2:47	Richmond, California, United States	
Win	5–1	Preston Scharf	Submission (rear-naked choke)	Tachi Palace Fights 25	November 19, 2015	1	1:42	Lemoore, California, United States	
Win	4–1	Richard Rigmaden	KO (punch)	West Coast FC 15	October 10, 2015	1	0:46	Sacramento, California, United States	Catchweight (180 lb) bout.
Win	3–1	Cris Barber	TKO (punches)	Tachi Palace Fights 22	February 5, 2015	1	1:14	Lemoore, California, United States	
Loss	2–1	Kazula Vargas	TKO (doctor stoppage)	Tachi Palace Fights 19	June 19, 2014	1	5:00	Lemoore, California, United States	
Win	2–0	J.C. Llamas	Decision (unanimous)	The Warriors Cage 19	January 25, 2014	3	5:00	Porterville, California, United States	
Win	1–0	Sean Choice	TKO (punches)	Cage Combat FC: Nor-Cal Conflict	June 22, 2013	3	2:06	Santa Rosa, California, United States	Welterweight debut.

== See also ==
- List of current UFC fighters
- List of male mixed martial artists
