= Nadia Kassem =

Australian mixed martial arts fighter

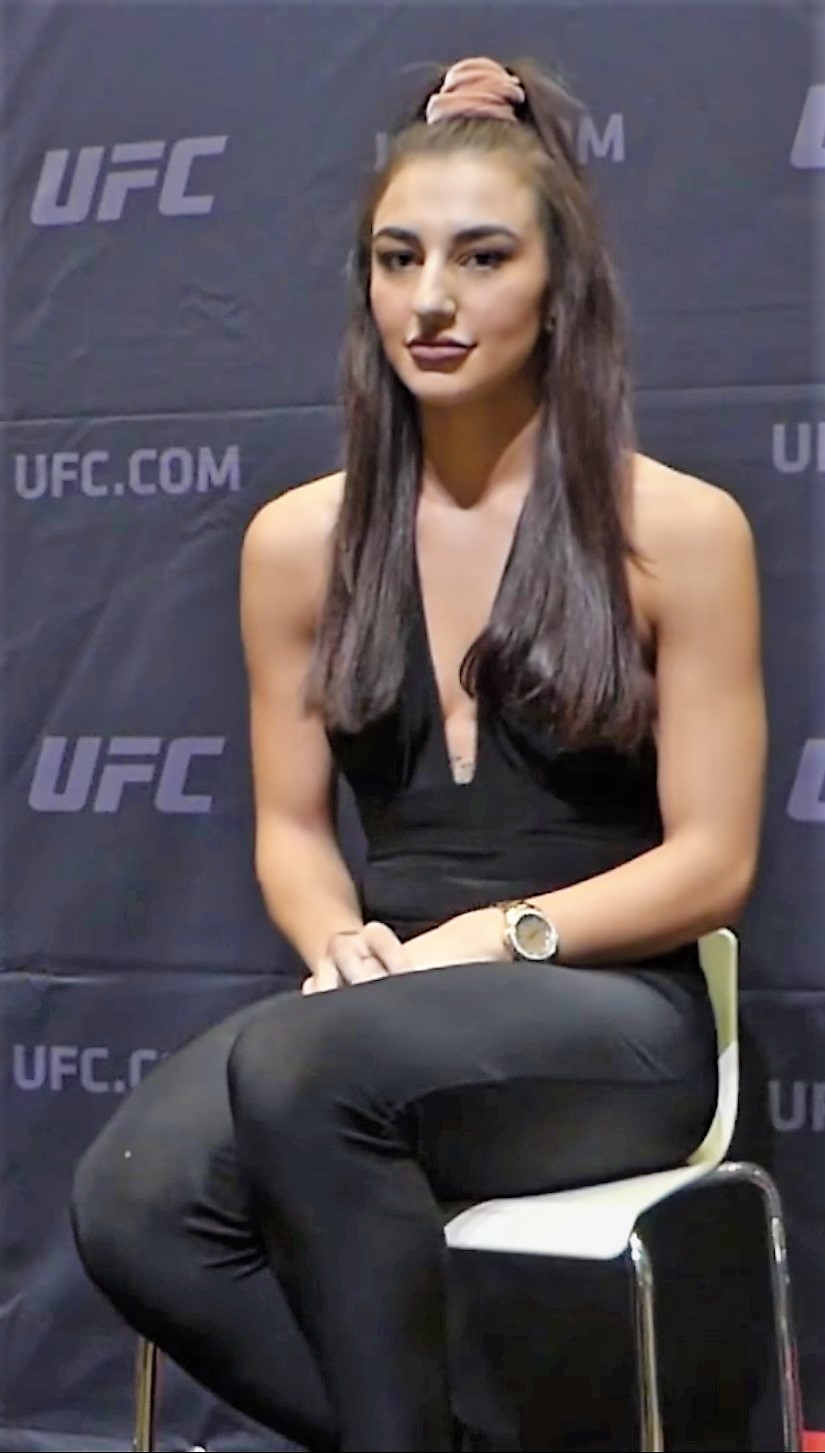
- Kassem interviewed at UFC 234
- Born: 15 November 1995 (age 31)
- Other names: 187
- Nationality: Australian
- Height: 5 ft 5 in (1.65 m)
- Weight: 52 kg (115 lb; 8 st 3 lb)
- Division: Strawweight
- Style: Boxing, BJJ
- Fighting out of: Wentworthville, Australia
- Team: Australian Top Team
- Years active: 2015–present

Mixed martial arts record
- Total: 7
- Wins: 5
- By knockout: 4
- By decision: 1
- Losses: 2
- By knockout: 1
- By submission: 1

Other information
- Mixed martial arts record from Sherdog

Nadia Kassem (born 15 November 1995) is an Australian former mixed martial artist who previously fought in the strawweight division of the Ultimate Fighting Championship (UFC).

== Background ==
Kassem was born in Wentworthville, New South Wales, Australia. Kassem is of Lebanese descent. Her grandparents migrated from Lebanon to Australia in the 1970s. She trained in Taekwondo and played rugby and softball when she was young. She was inspired by The Ultimate Fighter: Team Rousey vs. Team Tate TV series, but only started training MMA after watching her brother compete in grappling tournaments. Nadia started competing in amateur MMA not long after and turned pro. She had a record of 4–0 prior to signing with the UFC.

== Mixed martial arts career ==
=== Early career ===
Kassem fought in the Australian circuit under Urban Fight Night and Australia Regional promotion. She amassed an undefeated record of 4–0 prior to being signed by the UFC.

=== Ultimate Fighting Championship ===
Kassem was expected to make her promotional debut on 11 June 2017 at UFC Fight Night: Lewis vs. Hunt in Auckland, New Zealand against JJ Aldrich, but was removed from the card, citing injury, and replaced by Chan-Mi Jeon.

Kassem faced Alex Chambers at UFC Fight Night: Werdum vs. Tybura on 19 November 2017 in Sydney, Australia. At the weight-ins, Kassem weighed in at 120 pounds, 4 pounds over the strawweight upper limit for non-title fights of 116 pounds. The bout proceeded at a catchweight and Kassem forfeited 30% of her purse to Chambers. She won the fight by unanimous decision.

Kassem was scheduled to face Xiaonan Yan on 13 June 2018 at UFC Fight Night 132, however, she was pulled from the event due to injury.

Kassem faced Montana De La Rosa on 10 February 2019 at UFC 234. She lost the fight via armbar in the second round.

Kassem faced Ji Yeon Kim on 6 October 2019 at UFC 243. At the weigh-ins, Kim weighed 128 pounds, 2 pounds over the flyweight non-title fight limit of 126. She was fined 30% of her purse, which went to her opponent Kassem. The bout proceeded at catchweight. She lost the fight via technical knockout in round two. Kassem faced heavy criticism due to faking a glove touch at the beginning of the opening round and landing a side kick to Kim's abdomen.

Kassem was scheduled to face Miranda Granger on August 8, 2020 at UFC Fight Night 174.

On October 7, 2020 it was reported Kassem was released by UFC.

== Personal life ==
Her moniker "187" comes from the California Penal Code Section 187, which defines murder.

== Mixed martial arts record ==
Professional record breakdown
7 matches	5 wins	2 losses
By knockout	4	1
By submission	0	1
By decision	1	0

Res.	Record	Opponent	Method	Event	Date	Round	Time	Location	Notes
Loss	5–2	Ji Yeon Kim	KO (punch to the body)	UFC 243	6 October 2019	2	4:59	Melbourne, Australia	Catchweight (128 lbs) bout; Kim missed weight.
Loss	5–1	Montana De La Rosa	Submission (armbar)	UFC 234	10 February 2019	2	2:37	Melbourne, Australia	Return to Flyweight.
Win	5–0	Alex Chambers	Decision (unanimous)	UFC Fight Night: Werdum vs. Tybura	19 November 2017	3	5:00	Sydney, Australia	Return to Strawweight; Kassem missed weight (120 lbs).
Win	4–0	Jasita Yotawan	TKO (punches)	JNI Promotions: 1 on 1	24 February 2017	1	1:27	Hurstville, Australia	Won the JNI Promotions Flyweight Championship.
Win	3–0	Leigha Aurisch	TKO (head kick and punches)	Urban Fight Night 9: Fight of the Nations	3 December 2016	1	0:19	Liverpool, Australia	Won the UFN Strawweight Championship.
Win	2–0	Belinda Sedgewick	KO (spinning backfist)	Urban Fight Night 5	12 December 2015	1	0:10	Liverpool, Australia	Flyweight debut.
Win	1–0	Jiang Zhu	KO (punch)	JNI Promotions: The Century	28 August 2015	1	0:26	Hurstville, Australia	

== See also ==
- List of female mixed martial artists
