= Ramazan Kuramagomedov =

Russian mixed martial artist

- Born: Ramazan Ramazanovich Kuramagomedov; August 23, 1996 (age 30); Makhachkala, Dagestan, Russia
- Native name: Рамазан Рамазанович Курамагомедов
- Height: 6 ft 0 in (183 cm)
- Weight: 170 lb (77 kg; 12 st 2 lb)
- Division: Welterweight
- Reach: 73 in (185 cm)
- Style: Freestyle Wrestling; Wushu Sanda
- Stance: Orthodox
- Fighting out of: Makhachkala, Dagestan, Russia; Coconut Creek, Florida, U.S.
- Team: DagFighter (present); Ricardo Almeida BJJ (past); Jackson Wink MMA Academy (past); Xtreme Couture (2021-2022); American Top Team (2023-present)
- Trainer: Timur Valiev (main coach at DagFighter); Mansur Uchakaev (main coach at DagFighter); Mike Brown (main coach at ATT); Steve Mocco (wrestling coach at ATT)
- Rank: Master of Sport in Soyuz MMA
- Years active: 2014–2026

Mixed martial arts record
- Total: 14
- Wins: 14
- By knockout: 2
- By submission: 6
- By decision: 6
- Losses: 0

Other information
- Mixed martial arts record from Sherdog

Ramazan Ramazanovich Kuramagomedov (Russian: Рамазан Рамазанович Курамагомедов; born August 23, 1996) is a Russian former professional mixed martial artist, who last competed in the Welterweight division of the Professional Fighters League (PFL), where he was the inaugural PFL Welterweight World Champion. He formerly competed in the Welterweight division of Bellator MMA, where he was the last Bellator Welterweight Champion. He has previously fought for major MMA promotions like ACA, PFL, UAE Warriors, CFFC & Eagle FC.

== Background ==
Kuramagomedov was born in the Dagestani capital of Makhachkala, on August 23, 1996. His first love was football which he played with his friends either in backyard or in beaches of Makhachkala.

He like all the youths in Dagestan, grew up doing freestyle wrestling. He would join his friends when they signed up for wrestling camp. Kurmagomedov did freestyle wrestling for five years.

At the age of 15 years, he dabbled hard into world of mixed martial arts, after hearing the news that his compatriots Khabib Nurmagomedov, Rustam Khabilov and Ali Bagautinov were all signed by major MMA promotion, UFC.

Kuramagomedov is 2-time Russian MMA Cup winner. He was a regular training partner of notable MMA fighters like Carlos Condit, Donald Cerrone & former UFC champion, Chris Weidman, at Jackson Wink MMA Academy. He would even give Weidman a tough time in sparring matches, despite not having Pro MMA experience.

== Mixed martial arts career ==
=== Early career ===
Kuramagomedov of Russia has been dabbling in the world of pro mixed martial arts since 2014. He made his pro MMA debut in August 2014 at the Severo-Kavkazsky Federal Okrug tournament, where he defeated fellow Kavkaz fighter Khasan Masheev via submission in the first round of the fight. After his successful debut, he took 3-year hiatus from his pro MMA, as he became fully engrossed in Soyuz MMA scene.

=== Amateur MMA ===
On April 5, 2015, Kuramagomedov became runner-up at "Qualifying Club Championship of Stavropol Krai in SBE (MMA)". Few weeks later, on April 21, he again became runner-up at "North Caucasus Federal District Championship in Mixed Martial Arts (MMA)", held in the Chechen city of Grozny. However, on October 28 of the same year, Kuramagomedov finally won gold at "Russian MMA Cup" in Volgograd, Volgograd Oblast.

Few months later, on May 28, 2016, Kuramagomedov shared bronze medals with future One Championship lightweight contender, Saygid Izagakhmaev at WMMAA All-Russian MMA Championship, in the Russian city of Orenburg. However, October 3 of the same year, Kuramagomedov representing Ural Federal District won gold at All-Russian MMA Cup, in the city of Volgograd.

=== Return to pro MMA ===
On November 27, 2017, Kuramagomedov finally returned to the pro MMA scene, where he had his second fight against the Japanese grappler Yukinori "Akilyu 2" Akazawa at ACB 57: Magomedov vs. Yan card, which was decided in two minutes, when a sharp direct kick from Kuramagomedov hit the Japanese fighter in the liver, forcing the bout to be stopped as KO win for the Dagestani. Other MMA fighters, the Dagestani has defeated during his time at ACB/ACA promotion are Mindaugas Verzbickas of Lithuania & Georgi Valentinov of Bulgaria.

=== Professional Fighters League (PFL) ===
On August 30, 2018, Kuramagomedov was scheduled to face-off against American adversary Robert Hale at PFL 7: 2018 Regular Season card at Ocean Resort Casino in Atlantic City, New Jersey. He defeats "The Blue King" via unanimous decision with 30-27 scorecard from all three judges.

=== Dana White's Contender Series ===
Nearly one year later, on July 23, 2019, Kuramagomedov was booked in main event fight, against the future UFC fighter Jordan "Bomaye" Williams on season 3 of DWCS at middleweight. In an all-action fight that went the distance Kuramagomedov defeated Bomaye via split-decision in the eyes of the judges. Despite the win, Dana White decided against giving the UFC contract to Kuramagomedov.

=== Krepost Fight Club ===
After his ventures at DWCS, Kuramagomedov fought one more time in 2019 where he defeated Kyrgyz fighter Melisbek Abdrakhmanov via arm-triangle choke in round one of the fight.

=== Cage Fury Fighting Championships (CFFC) ===
On September 18, 2020 he was booked to fight against the American Kung-Fu specialist Trevor Ollison at CFFC 85: Hill vs. Lee card at Fitz Hotel & Casino, Tunica, Mississippi, United States. He defeated the American Kung-Fu brawler via arm-triangle choke in round two of the fight.

=== UFC ===
On February 27, 2021, Kuramagomedov agreed to fight in as replacement for Jamaican fighter Randy Brown against Alex Oliveira, at UFC Fight Night: Rozenstruik vs. Gane card in less than a week's notice. However, the Dagestani fighter was forced to withdraw from the bout due contracting illness during the fight camp.

=== UAE Warriors ===
On September 4, 2021, Kuramagomedov made his debut for middleeastern MMA promotion UAE Warriors, against the Argentine Matias Juarez, who replaced the Brazilian fighter William Macario, at their UAE Warriors 22: Saadeh vs. Bunch card at Jiu-Jitsu Arena, Abu Dhabi, United Arab Emirates; in which the Dagestani fighter submitted Juarez via rear-naked choke in round one of the fight. This was Kuramagomedov third submission victory in a row after his escapades in the DWCS.

=== Eagle Fighting Championship (EFC) ===
On January 28, 2022, Kuramagomedov was set to face-off against the American grappler John Howard at EFC 44: Spong vs. Kharitonov card at FLXcast Arena in Miami, Florida, USA. The fight went the distance as Kuramagomedov defeated his American adversary via unanimous decision.

=== Bellator MMA ===
Kuragmagomedov was finally set to make his debut for premiere MMA promotion Bellator against Jaleel Willis at Bellator 297. He KO'd his opponent via knee and punches.

On November 17, 2023, Kuramagomedov's second bout for Bellator MMA was booked against Randall Wallace at Bellator 301. He submitted Wallace via rear-naked choke in round two of the bout.

==== Bellator Welterweight champion ====
On June 22, 2024, Kuramagomedov faced Jason Jackson for Bellator Welterweight Championship at Bellator Champions Series 3. He won the championship by unanimous decision.

=== Return to PFL ===
Kuramagomedov faced Shamil Musaev for the inaugural PFL Welterweight Championship on February 7, 2026, at PFL Champions Series 5. He won the championship via unanimous decision He shockingly retired from MMA after the bout and the belt was vacated.

== Personal life ==
Kuramagomedov considers Khabib Nurmagomedov his hero. At American Top Team, his favorite sparring partners are Johnny Eblen and Magomed Magomedkerimov.

On April 25, 2016, Kuramagomedov was conferred the title of "Master of Sport" in MMA by then Minister of Sport, Vitaly Mutko at an awarding ceremony. November 22, of the same year, he rejected the opportunity to participate in edition of Russian MMA Super Cup, as he decided to relocate to America and train at Ricardo Almeida BJJ in New Jersey. Kuramagomedov was promptly replaced with 2016 Volgograd MMA Cup finalist Yunus Akhmedov.

He was member of Ricardo Almeida BJJ from 2016 to 2017. He trained at Jackson Wink MMA Academy from 2017 to 2019 as per records. He then hopped to Xtreme Couture gym (2021 to December 2022). Finally, Kurmagomedov seems to have settled in American Top Team gym (2023–present).

When he was at Ricardo Almeida BJJ gym at New Jersey City, he along with Zabit participated and won gold medals in a local grappling competition somewhere in 2017, after being tired of not getting MMA fight at regional American promotions.

Among the international Dagestani fighters, he was mentored in the sports by the likes of Zabit Magomedsharipov and Magomed Magomedov, who are also his teammates at DagFighter gym.

== Championships and achievements ==
=== Mixed martial arts ===
- Bellator MMA
  - Bellator Welterweight World Championship (One time; final)
- Professional Fighters League
  - PFL Welterweight Championship (One time; inaugural)

=== Amateurs MMA ===
- Second place, 2015 Qualifying Club Championship of Stavropol Krai in SBE (MMA), Stavropol (−77 kg)
- Second place, 2015 North Caucasus Federal District Championship in Mixed Martial Arts (MMA), Grozny (−77 kg)
- First place, 2015 All-Russian MMA Cup, Volgograd (−77 kg)
- Second place, 2015 Russian MMA Super Cup, Chelyabinsk (−77 kg)
- Third place, 2016 WMMAA All-Russian MMA Championship, Orenburg (−77 kg)
- First place, 2016 All-Russian MMA Cup, Volgograd (−77 kg)

== Mixed martial arts record ==
Professional record breakdown
14 matches	14 wins	0 losses
By knockout	2	0
By submission	6	0
By decision	6	0

Res.	Record	Opponent	Method	Event	Date	Round	Time	Location	Notes
Win	14–0	Shamil Musaev	Decision (unanimous)	PFL Dubai: Nurmagomedov vs. Davis	February 7, 2026	5	5:00	Dubai, United Arab Emirates	Won the inaugural PFL Welterweight Championship. Musaev was deducted one point in round 4 due to an illegal knee. Vacated the title on May 13, 2026, after announcing retirement.
Win	13–0	Jason Jackson	Decision (unanimous)	Bellator Champions Series 3	June 22, 2024	5	5:00	Dublin, Ireland	Won the Bellator Welterweight World Championship.
Win	12–0	Randall Wallace	Submission (rear-naked choke)	Bellator 301	November 17, 2023	2	3:49	Chicago, Illinois, United States	
Win	11–0	Jaleel Willis	KO (knee and punches)	Bellator 297	June 16, 2023	1	1:24	Chicago, Illinois, United States	
Win	10–0	John Howard	Decision (unanimous)	Eagle FC 44	January 28, 2022	3	5:00	Miami, Florida, United States	Super Welterweight (175 lb) bout.
Win	9–0	Matias Juarez	Submission (rear-naked choke)	UAE Warriors 22	September 4, 2021	2	4:58	Abu Dhabi, United Arab Emirates	Catchweight (175 lb) bout.
Win	8–0	Trevor Ollison	Submission (arm-triangle choke)	Cage Fury FC 85	September 18, 2020	2	3:22	Tunica, Mississippi, United States	Return to Welterweight.
Win	7–0	Melisbek Abdyrakhmanov	Submission (arm-triangle choke)	Krepost FC 1	December 14, 2019	1	1:51	Sochi, Russia	
Win	6–0	Jordan Williams	Decision (split)	Dana White's Contender Series 21	July 23, 2019	3	5:00	Las Vegas, Nevada, United States	Middleweight debut.
Win	5–0	Robert Hale	Decision (unanimous)	PFL 7 (2018)	August 30, 2018	3	5:00	Atlantic City, New Jersey, United States	
Win	4–0	Georgi Valentinov	Submission (guillotine choke)	ACB 81	February 23, 2018	2	0:45	Dubai, United Arab Emirates	
Win	3–0	Mindaugas Veržbickas	Decision (unanimous)	ACB 75	November 25, 2017	3	5:00	Stuttgart, Germany	
Win	2–0	Yukinori Akazawa	KO (kick to the body)	ACB 57	April 15, 2017	1	2:09	Moscow, Russia	
Win	1–0	Khasan Masheev	Submission (armbar)	Severo-Kavkazsky Federal Okrug: North Caucasian FC 2014	August 30, 2014	1	2:00	Pyatigorsk, Russia	Welterweight debut.
