= Callan Potter =

Australian mixed martial arts fighter

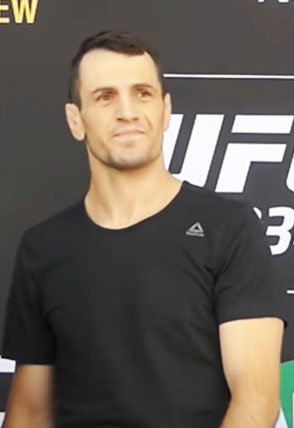
- Callan Potter at UFC 234 open workout
- Born: 6 September 1984 (age 42); Riddells Creek, Victoria, Australia
- Other names: The Rockstar
- Nationality: Australian
- Height: 6 ft 1 in (1.85 m)
- Weight: 170 lb (77 kg; 12 st 2 lb)
- Division: Welterweight; Lightweight
- Reach: 72 in (183 cm)
- Fighting out of: Melbourne, Australia
- Team: Renegade MMA; Resilience Training Centre (2020–present)
- Rank: Black belt in Brazilian Jiu-Jitsu under Jamie Murray
- Years active: 2011–2020

Mixed martial arts record
- Total: 27
- Wins: 18
- By knockout: 6
- By submission: 10
- By decision: 2
- Losses: 9
- By knockout: 5
- By submission: 4

Other information
- Mixed martial arts record from Sherdog

Callan Potter (born 6 September 1984) is an Australian retired mixed martial artist who most recently competed in the Welterweight division of the Ultimate Fighting Championship (UFC).

== Mixed martial arts career ==
=== Early career ===
Potter compiled a professional mixed martial arts record of 17–7 by fighting within the Australian regional MMA circuit for over 7 years winning various regional MMA titles before signing for UFC in January 2019.

=== Ultimate Fighting Championship ===
Potter made his UFC debut at lightweight on 9 February 2019 against Jalin Turner at UFC 234. He lost the fight via TKO in round one.

Potter then returned to welterweight and faced Maki Pitolo on 5 October 2019 at UFC 243. He won the fight via unanimous decision.

Potter then faced Song Kenan on 23 February 2020 at UFC Fight Night: Felder vs. Hooker. He lost the fight via KO in the first round. He was subsequently released from the promotion.

On August 7, 2020, Potter announced his retirement from mixed martial arts

== Personal life ==
Just before announcing his retirement, Potter started coaching at Dan Kelly's team Resilience Training Centre.

== Championships and accomplishments ==
- Eternal MMA
  - EMMA Lightweight Championship (One time)
    - One successful title defence
- Hex Fight Series
  - HEX Lightweight Championship (One time)
    - One successful title defence
- Valor Fight
  - Valor Fight Welterweight Championship (One time)
    - One successful title defence

== Mixed martial arts record ==
Professional record breakdown
27 matches	18 wins	9 losses
By knockout	6	5
By submission	10	4
By decision	2	0

Res.	Record	Opponent	Method	Event	Date	Round	Time	Location	Notes
Loss	18–9	Song Kenan	KO (punches)	UFC Fight Night: Felder vs. Hooker	23 February 2020	1	2:20	Auckland, New Zealand, New Zealand	
Win	18–8	Maki Pitolo	Decision (unanimous)	UFC 243	5 October 2019	3	5:00	Melbourne, Australia	Return to Welterweight.
Loss	17–8	Jalin Turner	TKO (body kick and punches)	UFC 234	9 February 2019	1	0:53	Melbourne, Australia	
Win	17–7	B.J. Bland	Decision (split)	EMMA – Eternal MMA 40	8 December 2018	3	5:00	Perth, Western Australia, Australia	
Loss	16–7	Marcin Held	Technical Submission (heel hook)	ACB 88 – Barnatt vs. Celinski	16 June 2018	1	1:09	Brisbane, Queensland, Australia	
Win	16–6	Jack Becker	KO (punch)	HFS – Hex Fight Series 12	24 November 2017	3	0:32	Melbourne, Australia	Won the HEX Lightweight Championship.
Win	15–6	Brentin Mumford	Submission (rear-naked choke)	EMMA – Eternal MMA 29	21 October 2017	1	3:43	Gold Coast, Queensland, Australia	Defended the EMMA Lightweight Championship.
Win	14–6	Abel Brites	Submission (triangle choke)	HFS – Hex Fight Series 8	31 March 2017	1	1:48	Melbourne, Australia	Won the HEX Lightweight Championship.
Win	13–6	Isaac Tisdell	Submission (guillotine choke)	EMMA – Eternal MMA 20	15 October 2016	1	1:04	Gold Coast, Queensland, Australia	Won the EMMA Lightweight Championship.
Win	12–6	Matiu Thoms	Submission (rear-naked choke)	HFS 6 – Ebersole vs. Kennedy	24 June 2016	1	3:21	Melbourne, Australia	Lightweight debut.
Win	11–6	Sam Hayward	KO (head kick)	HFS – Hex Fight Series 5	20 February 2016	3	0:17	Melbourne, Australia	
Win	10–6	Steven Maxwell	Submission (rear-naked choke)	Minotaur 2 – Rampage	27 November 2015	1		Parkville, Victoria, Australia	
Win	9–6	Kahn Sandy	Submission (arm-triangle choke)	HFS – Hex Fight Series 4	31 October 2015	2	4:10	Melbourne, Australia	
Loss	8–6	David Vergers	TKO (punches)	K-Oz Entertainment – Bragging Rights 7: Resurrection	27 September 2015	1	3:09	Perth, Western Australia, Australia	
Loss	8–5	Steve Kennedy	Submission (rear-naked choke)	HFS – Hex Fight Series 2	14 March 2015	1	3:15	Melbourne, Australia	
Win	8–4	Stuart Dare	KO (head kick)	Valor Fight 9 – Potter vs. Dare	22 November 2014	5	1:14	Launceston, Tasmania, Australia	Defended the VF Welterweight Championship.
Loss	7–4	Corey Nelson	KO (punches)	AFC 9 – Australian Fighting Championship 9	17 May 2014	1	3:15	Albury, New South Wales, Australia	For the AFC Welterweight Championship.
Win	7–3	David Butt	KO (head kick)	Valor Fight 7 – Potter vs. Butt	15 February 2014	2	0:11	Launceston, Tasmania, Australia	Won the VF Welterweight Championship.
Win	6–3	Troy Resic	TKO (punches)	AFC 7 – Australian Fighting Championship 7	14 December 2013	1	3:40	Melbourne, Australia	
Win	5–3	David Deconte	Submission (armbar)	MMADU – MMA Down Under 4	21 September 2013	1	1:54	Findon, South Australia, Australia	
Win	4–3	Nick Denholm	Submission (guillotine choke)	Valor Fight 5 – One Year Anniversary	15 June 2013	1	0:41	Launceston, Tasmania, Australia	
Win	3–3	Damon Upton-Greer	TKO (punches)	Valor Fight 5 – One Year Anniversary	15 June 2013	1	0:08	Launceston, Tasmania, Australia	
Loss	2–3	Jake Matthews	Submission (triangle armbar)	Shamrock Events – Night of Mayhem 6	16 March 2013	1	1:42	Keysborough, Victoria, Australia	For the FXP Welterweight Championship.
Win	2–2	Alex Oliver	Submission (rear-naked choke)	Valor Fight 3 – Invicta	8 December 2012	1	0:47	Launceston, Tasmania, Australia	
Loss	1–2	Richard Walsh	KO (knee)	Gladiators Cage Fighting – Gladiators 2	31 August 2012	1	4:15	Sydney, Australia	
Win	1–1	Domenic Chiavone	KO (punches)	Shamrock Events – Kings of Kombat 7	23 June 2012	1		Melbourne, Australia	
Loss	0–1	Nick Patterson	Submission (triangle choke)	Brute Force 15 – In the Line of Fire	20 May 2011	2	2:38	Coburg, Victoria, Australia	Welterweight debut.

== See also ==
- List of current UFC fighters
- List of male mixed martial artists
