= Wrestling Australia =

Australian wrestling body

Wrestling Australia Ltd.
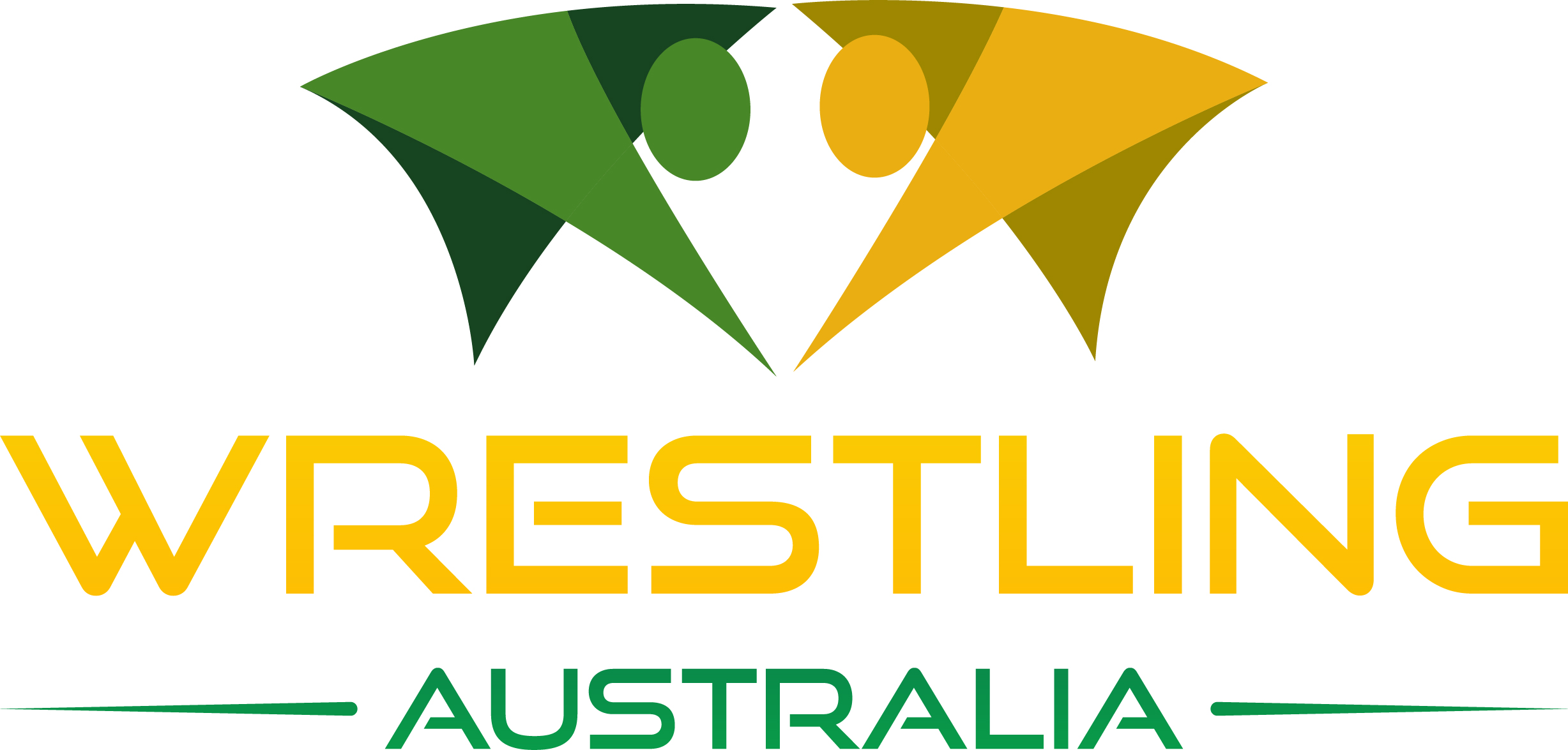
- Sport: Wrestling
- Jurisdiction: Australia
- Abbreviation: WAL
- Affiliation: United World Wrestling (UWW)
- Regional affiliation: Oceanian Council of Associated Wrestling

Official website
- www.wrestling.com.au
- (Australia)

Wrestling Australia (formerly known as the Australian Wrestling Union) is the organization that currently governs Beach wrestling, Freestyle wrestling, and Greco-Roman wrestling for Men and Women in Australia. Wrestling Australia is also the official representative to the Australian Olympic Committee (AOC) and to United World Wrestling (UWW) and is the national governing body of the sport.

== Structure ==
Wrestling Australia is affiliated to the Oceanian Council of Associated Wrestling (COLA) and United World Wrestling and is recognised by the Australian Olympic Committee (AOC).

The national body has six state member associations:

- Wrestling ACT
- Wrestling NSW
- Wrestling Queensland
- Wrestling SA
- Wrestling Victoria
- Wrestling WA

The main tournament they organise is the annual Australian National Wrestling Championships and the Australian Youth National Championships.

Wrestling Australia is a full member sport of the Combat Institute of Australia (CombatAUS).

== See also ==
- Amateur wrestling in Australia
