= Amateur wrestling in Australia =

- Governing body: Wrestling Australia

International competitions
- World Wrestling Championships

Wrestling is a low profile individual sport in Australia that Wrestling Australia is the national governing body of the sport, which organise competitions, and the national and Olympic team duties. In Australia the recognised wrestling styles include freestyle, Greco-Roman, and submission wrestling. Wrestling competitions and associations exist in the Australian Capital Territory, New South Wales, Queensland, South Australia, Tasmania, Victoria and Western Australia.

Three Australians have won medals in freestyle events at the Summer Olympics. In Los Angeles in 1932, Eddie Scarf was third in the light-heavyweight division. Sixteen years later in London, Dick Garrard won a silver medal as a welterweight and Jim Armstrong won a bronze medal in the heavyweight division. Garrard is the only wrestler to be inducted into the Sport Australia Hall of Fame. Australia has never won a Greco-Roman Olympic medal.

== Divisions ==
Amateur and Freestyle wrestling in Australia is held in the current divisions.

=== Freestyle ===
Men

- 55 kg
- 60 kg
- 66 kg
- 74 kg
- 84 kg
- 96 kg
- 120 kg

==== Women ====
- 44–48 kg
- 48 – 53 kg

53–55 kg

- 55 –59 kg

59– 63 kg

- 63 – 67 kg

67– 72 kg

=== Greco-Roman ===
==== Men ====
- 55 kg
- 55 – 60 kg
- 60 – 66 kg
- 66 – 74 kg
- 74 - 84kg
- 84 - 96kg
- 96 - 120kg

== See also ==
- Wrestling Australia
- Amateur wrestling
