= The Ultimate Fighter: The Smashes =

UFC mixed martial arts television series and event in 2012

- Genre: Reality, Sports
- Created by: Frank Fertitta III, Lorenzo Fertitta, Dana White
- Starring: Dana White, Ross Pearson, and George Sotiropoulos
- Country of origin: Australia

Production
- Running time: 60 minutes

Original release
- Network: FX Australia; ESPN UK
- Release: 19 September 2012

The Ultimate Fighter: The Smashes is the second foreign version of the Ultimate Fighting Championship (UFC)-produced reality television series The Ultimate Fighter. Like The Ultimate Fighter: Brazil, this version was filmed, in its entirety, outside Las Vegas, Nevada and consisted of 13 episodes with a live finale in Australia. The season tournament finale, along with the coaches fight, took place on 14 December 2012 at UFC on FX: Sotiropoulos vs. Pearson.

The series was officially announced by the UFC in May 2012. The name The Smashes is a play on the 130-year-old cricket rivalry between England and Australia called "The Ashes." The UFC held open tryouts during June 2012. The casting call was for Lightweight and Welterweight fighters who are at least 21 years old and have a minimum of two wins in three professional fights.

On 12 July 2012, Dana White announced that the coaches for the season would be Ross Pearson and George Sotiropoulos to represent the UK and Australia respectively.

== Cast ==
=== Coaches ===
Team Australia

- George Sotiropoulos, Head Coach
- Nick Kara
- Charles Blanchard
- Leonard Gabriel Jr.
- Nathan Coy

(United Kingdom) Team UK

- Ross Pearson, Head Coach
- Dean Amasinger
- Jimmy Harbison
- Jason Soares
- Erin Beach

=== Fighters ===
Team Australia

- Welterweights
  - Benny Alloway, Xavier Lucas, Manny Rodriguez (replaced by James Vainikolo due to injury), and Robert Whittaker.
- Lightweights
  - Grant Blackler, Patrick Iodice, Richie Vaculik, and Ben Wall.

(United Kingdom) Team UK

- Welterweights
  - Luke Newman, Bola Omoyele, Valentino Petrescu, and Brad Scott.
- Lightweights
  - Colin Fletcher, Norman Parke, Michael Pastou (replaced by Brendan Loughnane due to injury), and Mike Wilkinson.

== Episodes ==
Episode 1: National Pride

- All 16 fighters moved into the house, based in Australia, and were introduced to Dana White and their respective coaches.
- Team Australia won the coin toss, meaning they got to pick the first fight; however, Team UK gained the right to state which weight class would compete.
- Team UK's Michael Pastou sustained a bicep injury in sparring and was later told that the injury would most likely need surgery
- Benny Alloway defeated Valentino Petrescu via TKO (punches) at 0:42 of round 2.

Episode 2: Freak or Unique

- The fighters got a surprise visit from UFC Heavyweight Champion Junior dos Santos.
- Team UK's Michael Pastou was forced out of the competition due to his bicep injury, and was replaced by Brendan Loughnane.
- During training Team UK's Colin Fletcher decided to climb the scaffolding and put a fake mustache and eyepatch on George Sotiropoulos poster.
- With Team Australia in control, George puts Ben Wall against Colin Fletcher.
- Colin Fletcher defeated Ben Wall via unanimous decision.

Episode 3: Wasabi

- Team Australia retaliate to Team UK by cutting out the head of the Ross Pearson poster and sticking it on the body of Arianny Celeste.
- Ross Pearson took Team UK outside to train to get in touch with nature in the rain.
- Colin Fletcher and Ben Wall are persuaded to snort lines of Wasabi and Peri Peri Sauce.
- With Team UK in control, Pearson puts Luke Newman against Robert Whittaker.
- Robert Whittaker defeated Luke Newman via KO at 0:19 of round 1.

Episode 4: Pick Me!

- Team Australia tackle the outdoors by undertaking a long jog on the beach and doing some uphill sprints.
- Team Australia are fed up with Team UK's lack of cleanliness.
- With Team Australia in control, George puts Richie Vaculik against Norman Parke.
- Colin Fletcher does naked laps around the tennis court.
- The pranks get out of hand when Team Australia effortlessly put training mats against Team UK's changing room door. Team UK respond by tying a bucket full of coffee, water and honey to the doorknob so that it is poured onto an unsuspecting victim. Team Australia get back at them by pouring a bucket of smelly water onto Team UK's couches.
- Norman Parke defeats Richie Vaculik by unanimous decision.

Episode 5: Fight for Your Family

- Colin Fletcher defaces a poster of George Sotiropoulos in the house.
- Team Australia are not impressed with the house antics from Team UK which include food fights and more naked runs.
- With Team UK in control, Pearson puts Bola Omoyele against Manny Rodriguez.
- Luke Newman has thoughts of leaving the show and returning home as he can't train with his current medical suspension. With his friend Bola Omoyele due to fight next, he needs convincing from his teammates and coaches before finally deciding to stay on and support his team.
- Manny Rodriguez defeats Bola Omoyele via north-south choke at 4:07 of round 1.

Episode 6: True Warrior

- Team Australia's Manny Rodriguez was forced out of the competition after suffering a fractured leg in his previous bout, and was replaced by James Vainikolo.
- With Team Australia in control, George puts Patrick Iodice against Brendan Loughnane.
- Colin Fletcher dresses as the new replacement for Team Australia.
- Brendan Loughnane defeats Patrick Iodice by unanimous decision.

Episode 7: Unwise Words

- Ben Wall joins Team UK in a food fight.
- Pearson announces the last welterweight quarter-final fight; Brad Scott vs. Xavier Lucas
- The UFC has decided to have James Vainikolo fight his way into the semi-finals. Team Australia chooses which UK fighter will fight him.
- Team UK reads through Brad Scott's personal diary leaving many teammates upset.
- UFC Light Heavyweight, James Te Huna, visits Team Australia before their fight.
- Brad Scott defeats Xavier Lucas by unanimous decision.

Episode 8: Phone Home

- The final lightweight quarter-final is announced, Grant Blackler vs. Mike Wilkinson.
- Dean Amasinger (a UK assistant coach) walked in on an Australian training session to find a book with valuable info on all members of Team UK. Sotiropoulos begins ordering Amasinger to leave, Pearson then walks in to defend Amasinger.
- The book is then revealed as stolen by members of Team Australian and is given back to the Team UK coaches.
- It is announced that James Vainikolo will not fight a member of Team UK, but instead, would fight Xavier Lucas, which angers UK welterweight Valentino Petrescu.
- Dana White scolds Team UK for using a cell phone to call home, and send text messages of fight results.
- Vainikolo could not make weight and the fight was called off, causing Xavier Lucas to move into the semifinals.
- Mike Wilkinson defeats Grant Blackler via Submission of round 1.

Episode 9: Easy Route

- Brad Scott defeats Benny Alloway via split decision after 3 rounds

Episode 10: Smash it UP

- Norman Parke defeats Brendan Loughane via unanimous decision after 3 rounds

Episode 11: Friendly Fire

- Robert Whittaker defeats Xavier Lucas via TKO (punches) in round 1

Episode 12: Little and Large

- Colin Fletcher defeats Richie Vaculik via submission (keylock) in round 2

== Welterweight bracket ==
Quarter-finals
(Australia) Robert Whittaker | KO
(United Kingdom) Luke Newman | 1
(Australia) Manny Rodriguez* | SUB
(United Kingdom) Bola Omoyele | 1
(Australia) Xavier Lucas | 2
(United Kingdom) Brad Scott | UD
(Australia) Benny Alloway | TKO
(United Kingdom) Valentino Petrescu | 2

Semi-finals
(Australia) Robert Whittaker | TKO
(Australia) Xavier Lucas** | 1
(United Kingdom) Brad Scott | SD
(Australia) Benny Alloway | 3

Finale
(Australia) Robert Whittaker | UD
(United Kingdom) Brad Scott | 3

*James Vainikolo was due to fight Xavier Lucas for a spot in the next round to replace the injured Manny Rodriguez. Vainikolo did not make the weight therefore Lucas advanced to the semi-finals.

== Lightweight bracket ==
Quarter-finals
(Australia) Richie Vaculik | 2
(United Kingdom) Norman Parke | UD
(Australia) Patrick Iodice | 2
(United Kingdom) Brendan Loughnane | UD
(Australia) Ben Wall | 2
(United Kingdom) Colin Fletcher | UD
(Australia) Grant Blackler | 1
(United Kingdom) Mike Wilkinson* | SUB

Semi-finals
(United Kingdom) Norman Parke | UD
(United Kingdom) Brendan Loughnane | 3
(United Kingdom) Colin Fletcher | SUB
(Australia) Richie Vaculik | 2

Finale
(United Kingdom) Norman Parke | UD
(United Kingdom) Colin Fletcher | 3

*Mike Wilkinson was injured in training and was replaced by Australian Richie Vaculik.

Legend
| (Australia) | Team Australia |
| (United Kingdom) | Team UK |
| UD | Unanimous Decision |
| SD | Split Decision |
| SUB | Submission |
| (T)KO | (Technical)KO |

=== Bonus awards ===
The following $25,000 bonus were awarded to fights that took place during the TUF Smashes season:

- Fight of the Season: Ben Alloway vs. Brad Scott
- Knockout of the Season: Robert Whittaker
- Submission of the Season: Colin Fletcher

== The Ultimate Fighter: The Smashes Finale ==
UFC on FX: Sotiropoulos vs. Pearson
- The poster for UFC on FX: Sotiropoulos vs. Pearson
- Promotion: Ultimate Fighting Championship
- Date: December 15, 2012
- Venue: Gold Coast Convention and Exhibition Centre
- City: Gold Coast, Australia
- Attendance: 5,133
- Total gate: $900,000

Event chronology
| UFC on Fox: Henderson vs. Diaz | UFC on FX: Sotiropoulos vs. Pearson | The Ultimate Fighter: Team Carwin vs. Team Nelson Finale |

UFC on FX: Sotiropoulos vs. Pearson (also known as UFC on FX 6) was a mixed martial arts event held by the Ultimate Fighting Championship on December 15, 2012, at the Gold Coast Convention and Exhibition Centre in Gold Coast, Australia. Due to the time zone difference it aired live on December 14 in North America.

=== Background ===
The event featured the final bouts of The Ultimate Fighter: The Smashes. This was the first UFC event held in Queensland, and the first event in Australia to be held outside New South Wales.

Joe Martinez was the ring announcer in what would be his UFC octagon debut.

Australia's George Sotiropoulos and Britain's Ross Pearson headlined the card in a five-round main event. The pair had been coaching opposite one another on the hit reality TV series The Ultimate Fighter: The Smashes.

Kyle Noke was expected to face Seth Baczynski at the event. However, Noke was forced out of the bout with an injury and was replaced by Mike Pierce.

Anthony Perosh was expected to face Joey Beltran at the event. However, Perosh was forced from the bout with a toe injury and replaced by Igor Pokrajac.

A bout between Ednaldo Oliveira and Krzysztof Soszynski was originally scheduled for this event. However, Oliveira was forced out of the bout with an injury and Sosynski was pulled from the event as well.

Eddie Mendez was expected to make his promotional debut at the event against Nick Penner. However, Mendez pulled out of the bout citing a shoulder injury and was replaced by fellow newcomer Cody Donovan.

Hacran Dias was expected to face Chad Mendes at the event. However just days before the event, Dias pulled out of the bout citing a shoulder injury and was replaced by promotional newcomer Yaotzin Meza.

=== Results ===
Main Card (FX)
| Weight class | | | | Method | Round | Time | Notes |
|---|---|---|---|---|---|---|---|
| Lightweight | Ross Pearson | def. | George Sotiropoulos | TKO (punches) | 3 | 0:41 |
| Welterweight | Robert Whittaker | def. | Brad Scott | Decision (unanimous) (29–28, 29–28, 29–28) | 3 | 5:00 | (Note: The Ultimate Fighter: The Smashes Welterweight Finals.) |
| Lightweight | Norman Parke | def. | Colin Fletcher | Decision (unanimous) (30–27, 30–27, 29–28) | 3 | 5:00 | (Note: The Ultimate Fighter: The Smashes Lightweight Finals.) |
| Middleweight | Héctor Lombard | def. | Rousimar Palhares | KO (punches) | 1 | 3:38 |
Preliminary Card (Fuel TV)
| Featherweight | Chad Mendes | def. | Yaotzin Meza | KO (punches) | 1 | 1:55 |
| Light Heavyweight | Joey Beltran | vs. | Igor Pokrajac | No Contest | 3 | 5:00 | (Note: Originally ruled a Unanimous Decision (30-27, 30-27, 30-27) victory for Beltran, result was overturned due to testing positive for a banned substance.) |
| Welterweight | Mike Pierce | def. | Seth Baczynski | Decision (unanimous) (30–27, 29–28, 29–28) | 3 | 5:00 |
| Welterweight | Ben Alloway | def. | Manuel Rodriguez | KO (front kick and punches) | 1 | 4:57 |
| Lightweight | Mike Wilkinson | def. | Brendan Loughnane | Decision (unanimous) (29–28, 29–28, 29–28) | 3 | 5:00 |
| Light Heavyweight | Cody Donovan | def. | Nick Penner | TKO (punches) | 1 | 4:35 |

=== Bonus awards ===
The following fighters received $40,000 bonuses.

- Fight of the Night: Nick Penner vs. Cody Donovan
- Knockout of the Night: Ben Alloway
- Submission of the Night: Not awarded as no bouts ended by submission

=== See also ===
- 2012 in UFC
- List of UFC events
- Mixed martial arts in Australia
