= PFL 5 (2021) =

Professional Fighters League mixed martial arts event in 2021

- The poster for PFL 5
- Promotion: Professional Fighters League
- Date: June 17, 2021
- Venue: Ocean Casino Resort
- City: Atlantic City, New Jersey, United States

Event chronology
PFL 4	PFL 5	PFL 6

The PFL 5 mixed martial arts event for the 2021 season of the Professional Fighters League was held on June 17, 2021. This was the second regular season event of the tournament and included fights in the Welterweight and Light heavyweight divisions.

== Background ==
The event was headlined by a welterweight clash between the former UFC title contender and Bellator welterweight champion Rory MacDonald and the former UFC veteran Gleison Tibau.

In the co-main event, the 2019 PFL Welterweight tournament winner Ray Cooper III faced Nikolay Aleksakhin.

The remaining two fights of the main card featured Cezar Ferreira against Chris Camozzi in the Light Heavyweight division, and 2019 PFL Light Heavyweight tournament winner Emiliano Sordi facing former UFC and Bellator fighter Daniel Spohn.

At weigh-ins, Ray Cooper III weighed in at 171.8 pounds, missing weight by .8 pounds. He was fined 20 percent of his purse, deemed ineligible to win playoff points, given a walkover loss, and was penalized one point in the standings. Nikolay Aleksakhin received a walkover win regardless of bout outcome but is eligible to gain stoppage points.

== Results ==
Main Card (ESPN 2)
Weight class				Method	Round	Time	Notes
Welterweight	Gleison Tibau	def.	Rory MacDonald	Decision (split) (29-28, 28-29, 29-28)	3	5:00
Welterweight	Ray Cooper III	def.	Nikolay Aleksakhin	Decision (unanimous) (30-27, 29-28, 29-28)	3	5:00
Light Heavyweight	Emiliano Sordi	vs.	Dan Spohn	Draw (unanimous) (28-28, 28-28, 28-28)	3	5:00	(Note: Sordi was deducted a point in the first round due to strikes to the back of the head.)
Light Heavyweight	Chris Camozzi	def.	Cezar Ferreira	Decision (unanimous) (29-28, 29-28, 29-27)	3	5:00
Preliminary card (ESPN+)
Light Heavyweight	Antônio Carlos Júnior	vs.	Vinny Magalhães	No Contest (accidental knee to groin)	1	2:45	(Note: Júnior hit Magalhães with an accidental knee to the groin, rendering him unable to continue.)
Light Heavyweight	Cory Hendricks	def.	Marthin Hamlet	Submission (rear-naked choke)	3	4:09
Welterweight	João Zeferino	def.	Jason Ponet	Submission (arm-triangle choke)	2	2:16
Welterweight	Magomed Magomedkerimov	def.	Curtis Millender	Submission (ezekiel choke)	1	1:57
Light Heavyweight	Tom Lawlor	def.	Jordan Young	Decision (unanimous) (30-27, 30-27, 30-27)	3	5:00
Welterweight	Sadibou Sy	def.	Alexey Kunchenko	Decision (unanimous) (29-28, 29-28, 29-28)	3	5:00

== Standings After Event ==
The PFL points system is based on results of the match. The winner of a fight receives 3 points. If the fight ends in a draw, both fighters will receive 1 point. The bonus for winning a fight in the first, second, or third round is 3 points, 2 points, and 1 point respectively. The bonus for winning in the third round requires a fight be stopped before 4:59 of the third round. No bonus point will be awarded if a fighter wins via decision. For example, if a fighter wins a fight in the first round, then the fighter will receive 6 total points. A decision win will result in three total points. If a fighter misses weight, the opponent (should they comply with weight limits) will receive 3 points due to a walkover victory, regardless of winning or losing the bout, with the fighter who missed weight being deducted 1 standings point; if the non-offending fighter subsequently wins with a stoppage, all bonus points will be awarded. A fighter who was unable to compete for any reason, will receive a 1-point penalty (-1 point in the standings). The fighters who made weight will not receive a walkover, but will earn points and contracted purse amounts based on their performance in the altered matchup.

=== Light heavyweight ===
Fighter	Wins	Draws	Losses	1st	2nd	3rd	Total Points
♛ (Brazil) Antônio Carlos Júnior	1	0	0	1	0	0	7
♛ (Brazil) Cezar Ferreira	1	0	1	1	0	0	6
♛ (Norway) Marthin Hamlet	1	0	1	0	1	0	5
♛ (Argentina) Emiliano Sordi	1	1	0	0	0	0	4
E (United States) Cory Hendricks	1	0	0	0	0	1	4
E (United States) Chris Camozzi	1	0	1	0	0	0	3
E (United States) Jordan Young	1	0	1	0	0	0	3
E (United States) Tom Lawlor	1	0	1	0	0	0	3
E (United States) Dan Spohn	0	1	1	0	0	0	1
E (Brazil) Vinny Magalhães	0	0	1	0	0	0	0

=== Welterweight ===
Fighter	Wins	Draws	Losses	1st	2nd	3rd	Total Points
E (Brazil) João Zeferino	2	0	0	0	1	0	8
♛ (Canada) Rory MacDonald	1	0	1	1	0	0	6
♛ (United States) Ray Cooper III	2	0	0	1	0	0	5
♛ (Russia) Magomed Magomedkerimov	1	0	0	1	0	0	5
♛ (Sweden) Sadibou Sy	1	0	0	0	0	0	4
E (Russia) Nikolay Aleksakhin	0	0	1	0	0	0	4
E (Brazil) Gleison Tibau	1	0	1	0	0	0	3
E (France) Jason Ponet	0	0	2	0	0	0	0
E (United States) Curtis Millender	0	0	2	0	0	0	0
E (Russia) Alexey Kunchenko	0	0	1	0	0	0	-1

== See also ==
- List of PFL events
- List of current PFL fighters
