= Curtis Millender =

American mixed martial artist (born 1987)

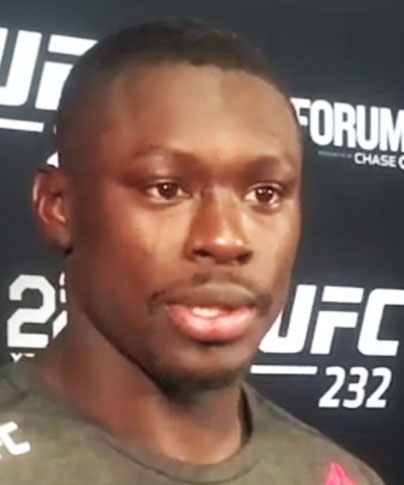
- Curtis Milender at UFC 232 in Inglewood, California, United States
- Born: Curtis Millender; December 1, 1987 (age 38); Anaheim, California, United States
- Other names: Curtious
- Height: 6 ft 2 in (1.88 m)
- Weight: 171 lb (78 kg; 12.2 st)
- Division: Welterweight
- Reach: 76 in (193 cm)
- Fighting out of: Anaheim, California, United States
- Team: NOC Fight Team; CSW; Team Bodyshop MMA
- Rank: Blue belt in Brazilian Jiu-jitsu under Erik Paulson
- Years active: 2013–2026

Professional boxing record
- Total: 3
- Wins: 3
- By knockout: 2
- Losses: 0

Mixed martial arts record
- Total: 37
- Wins: 22
- By knockout: 7
- By decision: 15
- Losses: 14
- By knockout: 3
- By submission: 8
- By decision: 3
- No contests: 1

Other information
- Spouse: Ashley Richie (m. 2019)
- Children: 2
- Boxing record from BoxRec
- Mixed martial arts record from Sherdog

Curtis Millender (born December 1, 1987) is an American former mixed martial artist who competed in the Middleweight division. A professional competitor since 2013, Millender has formerly competed in Ultimate Fighting Championship (UFC), Bellator MMA, Professional Fighters League (PFL), and Legacy Fighting Alliance (LFA).

== Mixed martial arts career ==
=== Early career ===
Millender began his professional MMA career in February 2013. During this period of his career, Millender competed exclusively for the California-based promotion, Fight Club OC. He compiled a perfect record of 7–0 in the organization, which included a three-round split decision victory over 10-6 Dominic Waters to become the FCOC welterweight champion.

=== Bellator MMA ===
Millender was expected to make his promotional debut against Michael Page at Bellator 134 on February 27, 2015. However, after a cut suffered by Page, Millender instead faced Brennan Ward at the event. Millender lost the fight via rear-naked choke submission in the first round, resulting in the first professional loss of his career.

Millender next faced Fernando Gonzalez at Bellator 137 on May 15, 2015. He lost the fight via guillotine choke submission in the third round. Millender was subsequently released from the promotion following his loss to Gonzalez.

Millender returned to face Steven Ciaccio at Bellator 141 on August 28, 2015. He won the fight via unanimous decision.

Millender faced Johnny Cisneros at Bellator 170 on January 21, 2017. He won the fight via TKO in the first round due to strikes.

=== Ultimate Fighting Championship ===
On the heel of a six fight win streak, including three straight on the regional scene under the Legacy Fighting Alliance promotion, Millender signed with the UFC in January 2018.

Millender made his promotional debut against Thiago Alves on February 18, 2018, at UFC Fight Night 126. He won the fight via a technical knockout in the second round. This win earned him the Performance of the Night bonus.

Millender faced Max Griffin on July 7, 2018, at UFC 226. He won the fight via unanimous decision.

Millender faced Siyar Bahadurzada on December 29, 2018, at UFC 232. He won the fight by unanimous decision.

Millender faced Elizeu Zaleski dos Santos on March 9, 2019, at UFC Fight Night 146. He lost the fight via a submission in round one.

Millender faced Belal Muhammad on April 13, 2019, at UFC 236. He lost the fight by unanimous decision.

On November 3, 2019, it was announced that Millender had been released from the UFC.

=== Return to Bellator ===
In November 2019, Millender announced that he had signed a contract with Bellator MMA.

In his return to the promotion, Millender faced Moses Murrietta at Bellator 238 on January 25, 2020. He won the fight by unanimous decision.

As the last fight of his prevailing contract, Millender faced Sabah Homasi at Bellator 243 on August 7, 2020. He lost the fight via unanimous decision.

=== Professional Fighters League ===
Already an alternative for the season, Millender stepped in on short notice and replaced David Michaud for the whole PFL 2021 season. He faced Rory MacDonald on April 29, 2021, at PFL 2 as the start of the 2021 PFL Welterweight tournament. He lost the bout in the first round via a rear-naked choke submission.

Millender faced Magomed Magomedkerimov at PFL 5 on June 17, 2021. He lost the bout via ezekiel choke submission in the first round.

Millender, as a replacement for Sadibou Sy, was scheduled to face Gleison Tibau on August 13, 2021, at PFL 7. On August 12, Millender was announced to have pulled out of the bout against Tibau.

=== Post PFL ===
Millender faced Jared Gooden on April 2, 2022, at XMMA 4. He lost the bout after getting dropped in the second round from a leg kick and getting finished by ground and pound.

Millender faced KB Bhullar on September 23, 2022, at Unified MMA 46. The bout ended in a no contest after an eye poke left Millender unable to continue.

Millender faced Salaiman Ahmadyar for the UNF Middleweight Championship on January 28, 2023, at UNF 4, winning the bout via TKO stoppage at the end of the first round.

Millender rematched KB Bhullar on March 31, 2023, at Unified MMA 50, winning the bout via unanimous decision.

Millender then defended his UNF Middleweight Championship against Sidiah Parker at UNF 11 on September 2, 2023. He won the bout via unanimous decision.

Millender faced Joel Bauman at Gamebred Bareknuckle MMA 6 on November 10, 2023. He won the fight via split decision.

Millender faced Alexander Shlemenko at Shlemenko FC 10 on June 1, 2024. He lost the fight via first-round TKO.

== Boxing career ==
Millender made his professional boxing debut against John Mercurio on February 17, 2022, winning via second-round knockout.

He made his sophomore appearance in the sport against Ke-ali’i Kanekoa at BYB Extreme Trigon Combat on April 27, 2023. He won the bout via second-round knockout.

He then faced Ryan Ford on May 26, 2023. He won the bout via unanimous decision.

== Personal life ==
Millender has two sons: Curtis Jr. and Carter. Millender is currently married to his long time girlfriend Ashley Richie now Ashley Millender. The two were married June 23, 2019. July 2020 they welcomed another baby boy Cross. The two are now divorced

== Championships and accomplishments ==
=== Mixed martial arts ===
- Ultimate Fighting Championship
  - Performance of the Night (One time) vs. Thiago Alves
- Fight Club OC
  - FCOC Welterweight Championship (Two times)
    - One successful title defense
- Lights Out Promotion
  - Lights Out Welterweight Championship (One time)
- Up Next Fighting
  - UNF Middleweight Championship (one time; current)
    - One successful title defense

== Mixed martial arts record ==
Professional record breakdown
37 matches	22 wins	14 losses
By knockout	7	3
By submission	0	8
By decision	15	3
No contests	1	

Res.	Record	Opponent	Method	Event	Date	Round	Time	Location	Notes
Loss	22–14 (1)	Malik Abdulmumin	Submission (rear-naked choke)	Up Next Fighting 36	November 7, 2026	1	0:39	Commerce, California, United States	
Loss	22–13 (1)	Renato Valente	TKO (elbows and punches)	Lights Out Xtreme Fighting 25	June 14, 2025	2	4:11	Pauma Valley, California, United States	Catchweight (195 lb) bout.
Loss	22–12 (1)	Yaroslav Amosov	Submission (anaconda choke)	Cage Fury FC 140	March 14, 2025	1	4:17	Philadelphia, Pennsylvania, United States	Catchweight (183 lb) bout.
Loss	22–11 (1)	Jesse Ronson	Submission (guillotine choke)	Gamebred Bareknuckle MMA 8	November 15, 2024	1	4:49	Biloxi, Mississippi, United States	Catchweight (175 lb) bout. Bare knuckle MMA.
Loss	22–10 (1)	Alexander Shlemenko	TKO (punches and elbows)	Shlemenko FC 10	June 1, 2024	1	4:19	Omsk, Russia	
Win	22–9 (1)	Joel Bauman	Decision (split)	Gamebred Bareknuckle MMA 6	November 10, 2023	3	5:00	Biloxi, Mississippi, United States	Bare knuckle MMA.
Win	21–9 (1)	Sidiah Parker	Decision (unanimous)	Up Next Fighting 11	September 2, 2023	5	5:00	Burbank, California, United States	Defended the UNF Middleweight Championship.
Win	20–9 (1)	KB Bhullar	Decision (unanimous)	Unified MMA 50	March 31, 2023	3	5:00	Enoch, Alberta, Canada	
Win	19–9 (1)	Salaiman Ahmadyar	TKO (punches)	Up Next Fighting 4	January 28, 2023	1	4:55	Commerce, California, United States	Won the UNF Middleweight Championship.
NC	18–9 (1)	KB Bhullar	NC (accidental eye poke)	Unified MMA 46	September 23, 2022	1	1:34	Enoch, Alberta, Canada	Middleweight debut. Accidental eye poke rendered Bhullar unable to continue.
Loss	18–9	Jared Gooden	TKO (leg kick and punches)	XMMA 4	April 2, 2022	2	0:16	New Orleans, Louisiana, United States	
Loss	18–8	Magomed Magomedkerimov	Submission (Ezekiel choke)	PFL 5 (2021)	June 17, 2021	1	1:57	Atlantic City, New Jersey, United States	
Loss	18–7	Rory MacDonald	Submission (rear-naked choke)	PFL 2 (2021)	April 29, 2021	1	3:38	Atlantic City, New Jersey, United States	
Loss	18–6	Sabah Homasi	Decision (unanimous)	Bellator 243	August 7, 2020	3	5:00	Uncasville, Connecticut, United States	
Win	18–5	Moses Murrietta	Decision (unanimous)	Bellator 238	January 25, 2020	3	5:00	Inglewood, California, United States	Catchweight (180 lb) bout.
Loss	17–5	Belal Muhammad	Decision (unanimous)	UFC 236	April 13, 2019	3	5:00	Atlanta, Georgia, United States	
Loss	17–4	Elizeu Zaleski dos Santos	Submission (rear-naked choke)	UFC Fight Night: Lewis vs. dos Santos	March 9, 2019	1	2:35	Wichita, Kansas, United States	
Win	17–3	Siyar Bahadurzada	Decision (unanimous)	UFC 232	December 29, 2018	3	5:00	Inglewood, California, United States	
Win	16–3	Max Griffin	Decision (unanimous)	UFC 226	July 7, 2018	3	5:00	Las Vegas, Nevada, United States	
Win	15–3	Thiago Alves	KO (knee)	UFC Fight Night: Cowboy vs. Medeiros	February 18, 2018	2	4:17	Austin, Texas, United States	Performance of the Night.
Win	14–3	Nick Barnes	KO (head kick)	LFA 30	January 12, 2018	2	2:51	Costa Mesa, California, United States	
Win	13–3	Matthew Frincu	KO (head kick)	LFA 24	October 13, 2017	1	0:38	Phoenix, Arizona, United States	
Win	12–3	Kevin Holland	Decision (unanimous)	LFA 13	June 2, 2017	3	5:00	Burbank, California, United States	
Win	11–3	Johnny Cisneros	TKO (punches)	Bellator 170	January 21, 2017	2	3:48	Inglewood, California, United States	
Win	10–3	Ozzie Alvarez	Decision (unanimous)	Fight Club OC: Thursday Night Fights 34	August 25, 2016	5	5:00	Costa Mesa, California, United States	Won the vacant Fight Club OC Welterweight Championship.
Win	9–3	Casey Greene	Decision (unanimous)	California Xtreme Fighting 3	June 25, 2016	5	5:00	Studio City, California, United States	Won the vacant CXF Welterweight Championship.
Loss	8–3	Eddie Mendez	Decision (unanimous)	Lights Out @ Sportsmen's Lodge: Fight Night 4	October 23, 2015	3	5:00	Studio City, California, United States	Catchweight (175 lb) bout.
Win	8–2	Steven Ciaccio	Decision (unanimous)	Bellator 141	August 28, 2015	3	5:00	Temecula, California, United States	
Loss	7–2	Fernando Gonzalez	Submission (guillotine choke)	Bellator 137	May 15, 2015	3	1:14	Temecula, California, United States	
Loss	7–1	Brennan Ward	Submission (rear-naked choke)	Bellator 134	February 27, 2015	1	1:37	Uncasville, Connecticut, United States	
Win	7–0	James Chaney	TKO (doctor stoppage)	Fight Club OC: Thursday Night Fights 23	October 16, 2014	1	0:48	Costa Mesa, California, United States	Defended the Fight Club OC Welterweight Championship.
Win	6–0	Dominic Waters	Decision (split)	Fight Club OC: Thursday Night Fights 21	June 19, 2014	3	5:00	Costa Mesa, California, United States	Won the vacant Fight Club OC Welterweight Championship.
Win	5–0	Johnny Mercurio	Decision (unanimous)	Fight Club OC: Thursday Night Fights 20	April 17, 2014	3	5:00	Costa Mesa, California, United States	
Win	4–0	Alex Suhonosov	Decision (unanimous)	Fight Club OC: Thursday Night Fights 18	December 5, 2013	3	5:00	Costa Mesa, California, United States	
Win	3–0	J.C. Llamas	Decision (unanimous)	Fight Club OC: Thursday Night Fights 16	August 15, 2013	3	3:00	Costa Mesa, California, United States	
Win	2–0	Blake Belshe	KO (punch)	Fight Club OC: Thursday Night Fights 14	April 11, 2013	1	0:34	Costa Mesa, California, United States	
Win	1–0	Paul Gemmati	Decision (unanimous)	Fight Club OC: Thursday Night Fights 13	February 28, 2013	3	5:00	Costa Mesa, California, United States	Welterweight debut.

== Professional boxing record ==
3 fights	3 wins	0 losses
By knockout	2	0
By decision	1	0

No.	Result	Record	Opponent	Type	Round, time	Date	Location	Notes
3	Win	3–0	Ryan Ford	UD	8	May 26, 2023	The Venue at River Cree, Alberta, Canada	
2	Win	2–0	Ke-ali’i Kanekoa	KO	2 (5), 2:25	Apr 27, 2023	The Hangar, Costa Mesa, California, US	
1	Win	1–0	John Mercurio	KO	2 (5), 3:00	Feb 17, 2022	The Hangar, Costa Mesa, California, US	

== See also ==
- List of male mixed martial artists
