= Gleison Tibau =

Brazilian mixed martial arts fighter

- Born: Janigleison Herculano Alves; July 10, 1983 (age 43); Tibau, Rio Grande do Norte, Brazil
- Height: 5 ft 6 in (1.68 m)
- Weight: 175 lb (79 kg; 12.5 st)
- Division: Welterweight; Lightweight
- Reach: 70 in (178 cm)
- Stance: Southpaw
- Fighting out of: Coconut Creek, Florida, United States
- Team: American Top Team (2006–present)
- Rank: Black belt in Brazilian Jiu-Jitsu
- Years active: 1999–present

Mixed martial arts record
- Total: 60
- Wins: 40
- By knockout: 4
- By submission: 16
- By decision: 20
- Losses: 20
- By knockout: 5
- By submission: 2
- By decision: 12
- By disqualification: 1

Other information
- Mixed martial arts record from Sherdog

Janigleison Herculano Alves, better known as Gleison Tibau (Portuguese pronunciation: [ɡlejˈzõ tʃiˈbaw]; born July 10, 1983) is a Brazilian mixed martial artist currently competing in the Welterweight division. A professional since 1999, he has competed for the UFC, Professional Fighters League (PFL), DEEP, and Golden Boy Promotions.

== Early life ==
Tibau began training for mixed martial arts at 13 and was fighting by 15. He was a state champion in Rio de Janeiro in both Brazilian jiu-jitsu and wrestling. He was brought up as a fighter in Kimura team, from northern Brazil. Tibau trains at American Top Team.

== Mixed martial arts career ==
=== Ultimate Fighting Championship ===
Tibau made his UFC debut at welterweight against Nick Diaz. Tibau started strong and was taking Diaz down efficiently while avoiding submissions using Brazilian Jiu Jitsu. In the second round he got tired and lost by TKO due to strikes. Tibau took on Jason Dent at UFC 68. Tibau won by unanimous decision. He then took a one fight hiatus from the company and returned to defeat Jeff Cox by submission due to an arm-triangle choke. Tibau then fought undefeated Brit Terry Etim, outwrestling his opponent for a unanimous decision.

Tibau then lost back to back fights to Tyson Griffin at UFC 81 and Joe Stevenson at UFC 86. He was on the verge of release from UFC by president Dana White. He rebounded with back to back wins over Rich Clementi and Jeremy Stephens.

At the TUF 9 Finale, Tibau fought Melvin Guillard. Tibau lost by split decision. Three media outlets scored the fight for Tibau.

Tibau's next fight was at UFC 104 where Tibau beat Josh Neer after landing 10 takedowns via unanimous decision (30-27, 30–27, 30–27).

Tibau won his second straight match with a first-round TKO over Caol Uno on March 31, 2010, at UFC Fight Night 21. Tibau faced Jim Miller on September 15, 2010, at UFC Fight Night 22. He lost the fight via unanimous decision.

Tibau beat Kurt Pellegrino on March 19, 2011, at UFC 128 via split decision.

Tibau then defeated veteran Rafaello Oliveira via second round rear naked choke, earning Submission of the Night honors.

Tibau won via split decision against Rafael dos Anjos on November 19, 2011, at UFC 139. Tibau next faced undefeated prospect Khabib Nurmagomedov on July 7, 2012, at UFC 148, losing via a controversial unanimous decision. 5 out of 6 MMA outlets scored the bout for Tibau.

Tibau fought Francisco Trinaldo on October 13, 2012, at UFC 153 winning via unanimous decision.

He lost to Evan Dunham on February 2, 2013, at UFC 156 by split decision. Tibau then faced John Cholish on May 18, 2013, at UFC on FX 8, winning via second round submission.

Tibau beat Jamie Varner on August 31, 2013, at UFC 164 by split decision. With this fight, he became the youngest fighter in UFC history to record 20 bouts.

Tibau lost to Michael Johnson in the last fight of his contract on December 28, 2013, at UFC 168 via second-round knockout.

On January 16, 2014, Tibau signed a four-fight contract.

Tibau faced Pat Healy on July 16, 2014, at UFC Fight Night 45, winning by unanimous decision.

Tibau next faced Piotr Hallmann on September 13, 2014, at UFC Fight Night 51. He won the back-and-forth fight via split decision. This fight earned Tibau his first Fight of the Night bonus award. Following the bout Hallmann failed his post fight drug test due to the presence of drostanolone in his system.

Tibau defeated Norman Parke on January 18, 2015, at UFC Fight Night 59, replacing Jorge Masvidal, winning via split decision.

Tibau replaced an injured Yancy Medeiros was against Tony Ferguson on February 28, 2015, at UFC 184, losing by submission in the first round, his first submission defeat since his 2008 loss to Joe Stevenson.

Tibau defeated Abel Trujillo at UFC Fight Night 77 on November 7, 2015 via a first round submission. Tibau took Trujillo's back, secured a body triangle from the bottom and grabbed a rear-naked choke grip with his arm underneath Trujillo's chin. After a few seconds in this position, referee Keith Peterson halted the contest as he believed that Trujillo was unconscious. Trujillo indicated that he planned to appeal the decision in hopes that the result may be changed to a No Contest.

On December 4, 2015, Tibau was suspended by USADA due to a potential Anti-Doping Policy violation stemming from an out-of-competition test. On December 23, 2015, it was reported that he had also failed an in-competition test following his win over Trujillo. On February 18, 2016, Tibau was suspended for 2 years by USADA as well as having the result of his fight against Trujillo reversed to a loss.

Tibau faced Islam Makhachev on January 20, 2018, at UFC 220. He lost the fight by knockout in the first round.

Tibau faced Desmond Green on June 1, 2018, at UFC Fight Night 131. He lost the fight by unanimous decision.

Tibau's bout with Green marked the last fight of his contract and after more than a decade in the UFC, Tibau chose not to renew the contract, becoming a free agent.

=== Post-UFC career ===
After the long career in the UFC, Tibau revealed he will be moving up to welterweight division. On September 4, 2018, it was revealed that Tibau would fight Golden Boy Promotions' inaugural MMA event, headlined by the third encounter of Chuck Liddell and Tito Ortiz. Despite the announcement on going up a weight class, Tibau faced fellow UFC veteran Efraín Escudero in a 160lbs catchweight bout. He won the fight via unanimous decision.

Tibau replaced Abel Trujillo on short notice against Will Brooks at Battlefield FC 2 on July 27, 2019, winning by Round 1 Submission.

Tibau was next expected to face Chris Cisneros at Taura MMA 11 on October 30, 2020. However, the bout was moved to Taura MMA 12 on November 22, 2020, which in turn was postponed due to COVID-19 pandemic related issues.

=== Professional Fighters League ===
==== 2021 season ====
On February 25, 2021, news surfaced that Tibau had signed with Professional Fighters League and is expected to compete in the welterweight tournament of season 2021.

Tibau was set to face fellow UFC vet Alexey Kunchenko on April 29, 2021, at PFL 2 as the start of the 2021 PFL Welterweight tournament. On March 25, it was announced that Kunchenko pulled out of the bout and due to this Tibau was set to face João Zeferino. He lost the bout via unanimous decision.

Tibau faced Rory MacDonald at PFL 5 on June 17, 2021. He won the fight by a controversial split decision, with the vast majority of media scores and other professional MMA fighters scoring the bout as a win for MacDonald. Despite the victory over MacDonald, Tibau did not advance to the playoffs.

Tibau was scheduled to face Sadibou Sy on August 13, 2021, at PFL 7. However on August 4, it was announced that Sy replaced João Zeferino in the playoffs, and therefore Tibau's new opponent would be Curtis Millender. On August 12, Millender was announced to have pulled out of the bout, so Tibau instead faced Micah Terrill. Tibau won the bout via technical submission, choking Terrill unconscious in the first round via arm-triangle choke.

==== 2022 season ====
Tibau faced Jarrah Al-Silawi on May 6, 2022, at PFL 3. He lost the bout via controversial split decision.

Tibau was scheduled to face Nikolai Aleksakhin on July 1, 2022, at PFL 6. However, Tibau pulled out of the bout and was replaced by Carlos Leal.

Tibau faced Magomed Magomedkerimov on November 25, 2022, at PFL 10. He lost the bout via unanimous decision.

=== Post PFL ===
Tibau faced Alexey Kunchenko on February 11, 2023, at RCC 14, losing the bout via unanimous decision.

Tibau returned to RCC at RCC 16, facing Boris Medvedev on July 28, 2023, losing the bout via TKO stoppage at the end of the first round.

Tibau faced Burenzorig Batmunkh on January 21, 2024 at Top Brights 1, winning the bout via split decision.

Tibau was scheduled to face Alex Oliveira in the inaugural Global Fight League event on May 24, 2025 at GFL 1. However, all GFL events were cancelled indefinitely.

== Championships and Accomplishments ==
=== Mixed Martial Arts ===
- Ultimate Fighting Championship
  - Fight of the Night (One time) vs. Piotr Hallmann
  - Submission of the Night (One time) vs. Rafaello Oliveira
  - Most takedowns landed in the UFC Lightweight division (84)
  - Third most takedowns landed in UFC history (84)
  - Tied (Andre Fili & Sean Strickland) for most split decision wins in UFC history (5)
    - Tied (Sean Strickland) for second most split decision bouts in UFC history (7) (behind Clay Guida)
  - Most decision wins in UFC Lightweight division history (11)
  - Tied (King Green) for fifth most wins in UFC Lightweight division history (16)
  - Tied (Joe Lauzon) for fifth most bouts in UFC Lightweight division history (27)
  - Sixth most total fight time in UFC Lightweight division history (5:01:30)
  - Second most control time in UFC Lightweight division history (1:39:57)
  - Second most top control time in UFC Lightweight division history (1:11:30)
  - Highest takedown defense percentage in UFC Lightweight division history (92.0%)

== Mixed martial arts record ==
Professional record breakdown
60 matches	40 wins	20 losses
By knockout	4	5
By submission	16	2
By decision	20	12
By disqualification	0	1

Res.	Record	Opponent	Method	Event	Date	Round	Time	Location	Notes
Loss	40–20	Abdul-Aziz Abdulvakhabov	Decision (unanimous)	ACA 208	October 4, 2026	3	5:00	Grozny, Russia	
Win	40–19	Matias Juarez	Submission (arm-triangle choke)	WNC 3	October 18, 2025	1	2:20	Geneva, Switzerland	Return to Welterweight. Won the inaugural WNC Welterweight Championship.
Win	39–19	Joël Kouadja	Decision (unanimous)	Warriors Night MMA 1	September 14, 2024	3	5:00	Geneva, Switzerland	Middleweight debut.
Win	38–19	Burenzorig Batmunkh	Decision (split)	TOP BRIGHTS 01	January 21, 2024	3	5:00	Ōta, Japan	
Loss	37–19	Boris Medvedev	TKO (punches)	RCC 16	July 28, 2023	1	4:54	Tyumen, Russia	
Loss	37–18	Alexey Kunchenko	Decision (unanimous)	RCC 14	February 11, 2023	3	5:00	Tyumen, Russia	
Loss	37–17	Magomed Magomedkerimov	Decision (unanimous)	PFL 10 (2022)	November 25, 2022	3	5:00	New York City, New York, United States	Catchweight (175 lb) bout.
Loss	37–16	Jarrah Al-Silawi	Decision (split)	PFL 3 (2022)	May 6, 2022	3	5:00	Arlington, Texas, United States	
Win	37–15	Micah Terrill	Technical Submission (arm-triangle choke)	PFL 7 (2021)	August 13, 2021	1	2:17	Hollywood, Florida, United States	
Win	36–15	Rory MacDonald	Decision (split)	PFL 5 (2021)	June 17, 2021	3	5:00	Atlantic City, New Jersey, United States	
Loss	35–15	João Zeferino	Decision (unanimous)	PFL 2 (2021)	April 29, 2021	3	5:00	Atlantic City, New Jersey, United States	Return to Welterweight.
Win	35–14	Will Brooks	Submission (guillotine choke)	Battlefield FC 2	July 27, 2019	1	3:34	Macau, SAR, China	
Win	34–14	Efraín Escudero	Decision (unanimous)	Golden Boy Promotions: Liddell vs. Ortiz 3	November 24, 2018	3	5:00	Inglewood, California, United States	Catchweight (160 lbs) bout
Loss	33–14	Desmond Green	Decision (unanimous)	UFC Fight Night: Rivera vs. Moraes	June 1, 2018	3	5:00	Utica, New York, United States	
Loss	33–13	Islam Makhachev	KO (punch)	UFC 220	January 20, 2018	1	0:57	Boston, Massachusetts, United States	
Loss	33–12	Abel Trujillo	DQ (overturned)	UFC Fight Night: Belfort vs. Henderson 3	November 7, 2015	1	1:45	São Paulo, Brazil	Originally a submission (rear naked choke) win for Tibau; overturned after he tested positive for erythropoietin.
Loss	33–11	Tony Ferguson	Submission (rear-naked choke)	UFC 184	February 28, 2015	1	2:37	Los Angeles, California, United States	
Win	33–10	Norman Parke	Decision (split)	UFC Fight Night: McGregor vs. Siver	January 18, 2015	3	5:00	Boston, Massachusetts, United States	
Win	32–10	Piotr Hallmann	Decision (split)	UFC Fight Night: Bigfoot vs. Arlovski	September 13, 2014	3	5:00	Brasília, Brazil	Fight of the Night.
Win	31–10	Pat Healy	Decision (unanimous)	UFC Fight Night: Cowboy vs. Miller	July 16, 2014	3	5:00	Atlantic City, New Jersey, United States	
Loss	30–10	Michael Johnson	KO (punches)	UFC 168	December 28, 2013	2	1:32	Las Vegas, Nevada, United States	
Win	30–9	Jamie Varner	Decision (split)	UFC 164	August 31, 2013	3	5:00	Milwaukee, Wisconsin, United States	
Win	29–9	John Cholish	Submission (guillotine choke)	UFC on FX: Belfort vs. Rockhold	May 18, 2013	2	2:34	Jaraguá do Sul, Brazil	
Loss	28–9	Evan Dunham	Decision (split)	UFC 156	February 2, 2013	3	5:00	Las Vegas, Nevada, United States	
Win	28–8	Francisco Trinaldo	Decision (unanimous)	UFC 153	October 13, 2012	3	5:00	Rio de Janeiro, Brazil	
Loss	27–8	Khabib Nurmagomedov	Decision (unanimous)	UFC 148	July 7, 2012	3	5:00	Las Vegas, Nevada, United States	
Win	27–7	Rafael dos Anjos	Decision (split)	UFC 139	November 19, 2011	3	5:00	San Jose, California, United States	
Win	26–7	Rafaello Oliveira	Submission (rear-naked choke)	UFC 130	May 28, 2011	2	3:28	Las Vegas, Nevada, United States	Submission of the Night.
Win	25–7	Kurt Pellegrino	Decision (split)	UFC 128	March 19, 2011	3	5:00	Newark, New Jersey, United States	
Loss	24–7	Jim Miller	Decision (unanimous)	UFC Fight Night: Marquardt vs. Palhares	September 15, 2010	3	5:00	Austin, Texas, United States	
Win	24–6	Caol Uno	TKO (punches)	UFC Fight Night: Florian vs. Gomi	March 31, 2010	1	4:13	Charlotte, North Carolina, United States	
Win	23–6	Josh Neer	Decision (unanimous)	UFC 104	October 24, 2009	3	5:00	Los Angeles, California, United States	Catchweight (157 lbs) bout; both fighters missed weight.
Loss	22–6	Melvin Guillard	Decision (split)	The Ultimate Fighter: United States vs. United Kingdom Finale	June 20, 2009	3	5:00	Las Vegas, Nevada, United States	
Win	22–5	Jeremy Stephens	Decision (unanimous)	UFC Fight Night: Condit vs. Kampmann	April 1, 2009	3	5:00	Nashville, Tennessee, United States	Catchweight (158 lbs) bout; both fighters missed weight.
Win	21–5	Rich Clementi	Submission (guillotine choke)	UFC Fight Night: Lauzon vs. Stephens	February 7, 2009	1	4:35	Tampa, Florida, United States	
Loss	20–5	Joe Stevenson	Submission (guillotine choke)	UFC 86	July 5, 2008	2	2:57	Las Vegas, Nevada, United States	
Loss	20–4	Tyson Griffin	Decision (unanimous)	UFC 81	February 2, 2008	3	5:00	Las Vegas, Nevada, United States	
Win	20–3	Terry Etim	Decision (unanimous)	UFC 75	September 8, 2007	3	5:00	London, England	
Win	19–3	Jeff Cox	Submission (arm-triangle choke)	UFC Fight Night: Stout vs. Fisher	June 12, 2007	1	1:52	Hollywood, Florida, United States	
Win	18–3	Antonio Moreno	TKO (punches)	Nordest Combat Championship	May 9, 2007	1	0:55	Natal, Brazil	
Win	17–3	Jason Dent	Decision (unanimous)	UFC 68	March 3, 2007	3	5:00	Columbus, Ohio, United States	Lightweight debut.
Loss	16–3	Nick Diaz	TKO (punches)	UFC 65	November 18, 2006	2	2:27	Sacramento, California, United States	Welterweight bout.
Win	16–2	Jędrzej Kubski	Submission (rear-naked choke)	KO Arena 4	March 11, 2006	1	1:03	Málaga, Spain	
Win	15–2	Edilson Florencio	Submission (triangle choke)	Mega Combate Mossoró	December 2, 2005	1	3:26	Mossoró, Brazil	
Win	14–2	Fabrício Camões	Submission (rear-naked choke)	Meca World Vale Tudo 12	July 9, 2005	1	2:15	Rio de Janeiro, Brazil	
Loss	13–2	Marcelo Brito	Decision (unanimous)	Storm Samurai 7	June 11, 2005	3	5:00	Curitiba, Brazil	
Win	13–1	Josenildo Rodrigues	Decision (unanimous)	Ceara Open 2	March 10, 2005	3	5:00	Fortaleza, Brazil	
Win	12–1	Anderson Cruz	KO (punches)	Octagon Fight	February 24, 2005	1	N/A	Natal, Brazil	
Win	11–1	Josenildo Ramalho	Submission (armbar)	Brazilian Challenger 2	October 21, 2004	1	N/A	Natal, Brazil	
Win	10–1	Carlos Alexandre Pereira	Submission (rear-naked choke)	Champions Night 11	October 7, 2004	1	1:16	Fortaleza, Brazil	
Win	9–1	Adriano Martins	Decision (unanimous)	Amazon Fight	June 20, 2004	3	5:00	Manaus, Brazil	
Win	8–1	Daniel Muralha	Submission (armbar)	Champions Night 10	May 21, 2004	1	N/A	Marília, Brazil	
Win	7–1	Romario da Silva	Submission (rear-naked choke)	Desafio: Natal vs Nordeste	March 9, 2004	1	2:30	Natal, Brazil	
Loss	6–1	Eiji Mitsuoka	TKO (corner stoppage)	DEEP: 11th Impact	July 13, 2003	2	3:41	Osaka, Japan	Welterweight bout.
Win	6–0	Fernando Terere	Decision (split)	Bitetti Combat Nordeste 2	March 20, 2003	3	5:00	Natal, Brazil	
Win	5–0	Unknown Fighter	Submission (americana)	Tibau Fight	January 11, 2003	1	0:00	Natal, Brazil	
Win	4–0	Paulo Boiko	Decision (unanimous)	Bitetti Combat Nordeste 1	November 28, 2002	3	5:00	Natal, Brazil	
Win	3–0	Thiago Alves	Submission (armbar)	Champions Night 2	June 30, 2001	2	3:31	Natal, Brazil	
Win	2–0	Rivanio Regiz	Decision (unanimous)	Currais Novos Vale Tudo Open	May 18, 2000	3	5:00	Currais Novos, Brazil	
Win	1–0	Ricardo Ricardo	TKO (retirement)	Mossoro Open de Vale Tudo 3	December 24, 1999	1	N/A	Natal, Brazil	

== See also ==
- List of male mixed martial artists
