= Chris Camozzi =

American mixed martial arts fighter (born 1986)

- Born: Christopher Allen Camozzi; November 20, 1986 (age 39); Alameda, California, U.S.
- Height: 6 ft 3 in (1.91 m)
- Weight: 205 lb (93 kg; 14 st 9 lb)
- Division: Light heavyweight Middleweight
- Reach: 78 in (200 cm)
- Stance: Southpaw
- Fighting out of: Lakewood, Colorado, U.S.
- Team: Gumm MMA & Fitness (formerly); Factory X Muay Thai (2010–2020); Genesis Training Center (2020–present)
- Rank: Black belt in Brazilian Jiu-Jitsu under Steve Hordinski
- Years active: 2006–present

Kickboxing record
- Total: 4
- Wins: 3
- By knockout: 2
- Losses: 1

Mixed martial arts record
- Total: 42
- Wins: 27
- By knockout: 8
- By submission: 7
- By decision: 12
- Losses: 15
- By knockout: 1
- By submission: 6
- By decision: 8

Bare-knuckle boxing record
- Total: 6
- Wins: 4
- By knockout: 3
- Losses: 2
- By knockout: 0

Other information
- Mixed martial arts record from Sherdog

Christopher Allen Camozzi (born November 20, 1986) is an American professional Glory kickboxer, mixed martial artist and bare-knuckle boxer. He currently competes for the Bare Knuckle Fighting Championship, where he is a former BKFC Cruiserweight World Champion. A professional MMA competitor since 2006, Camozzi has formerly competed in the Middleweight division of the Ultimate Fighting Championship, MFC, Shark Fights, HDNet Fights, and was also a contestant on Spike TV's 11th season of The Ultimate Fighter in 2010.

As of April 13, 2026, he is #1 in the BKFC cruiserweight rankings.

== Background ==
Camozzi is from Alameda, California and competed in wrestling and rugby in high school. Camozzi then continued his rugby career at Fort Lewis College, but soon dropped out and headed back home to train in Muay Thai and Brazilian jiu-jitsu. A coach of Camozzi's, who had fought in some of the earlier UFC events, asked Camozzi if he was interested in mixed martial arts, and Camozzi soon began his career.

== Mixed martial arts career ==
=== Early career ===
Camozzi fought former Ultimate Fighter competitor Jesse Taylor for the King of Champions Middleweight Championship. After three rounds, the judges declared Taylor the winner, giving him the title.

=== The Ultimate Fighter ===
Camozzi signed to take part in the eleventh season of the Ultimate Fighter. Camozzi's preliminary fight to get into the house was against Victor O'Donnell. After three hard-fought rounds between the two of them, Camozzi was declared the winner. However, the damage to both competitors was noticeable, with O'Donnell walking away with a severely fractured orbital bone and Camozzi entering the house with a broken jaw.

This damage to Camozzi proved to be the end of his run on the show, as during the third episode of the season, Dana White informed Camozzi that he had to withdraw from the competition due to his injury. Seth Baczynski stepped in as Camozzi's replacement.

=== Ultimate Fighting Championship ===
Though Camozzi was removed from the show, he fought at The Ultimate Fighter: Team Liddell vs. Team Ortiz Finale against James Hammortree. Camozzi won a unanimous decision (29–28, 30–27, 30–27).

Camozzi's next fight was at UFC 121 against Korean UFC newcomer Dongi Yang. Yang began the fight with a successful takedown, followed by ground-and-pound. After standing up, Camozzi was able to keep Yang at bay with kicks, before engaging in the clinch. However, Yang's thick neck and shoulders prevented effective attacks. Later, Camozzi was able to effectively time the advance of Yang. In the third, Yang began to tire and swing wildly, to no avail. Camozzi was declared the winner via split decision (29–28, 28–29, 29–28).

Camozzi faced off against Kyle Noke on February 27, 2011, at UFC 127. He lost the fight via rear-naked choke submission in the first round and was subsequently released from the promotion.

=== Shark Fights ===
Following his release from the UFC, Camozzi faced Joey Villaseñor at Shark Fights 15. The fight was initially ruled a draw, but was subsequently overturned and counted as a split decision win for Camozzi by the New Mexico Athletic Commission when it was revealed one of the judge's scores was added incorrectly.

=== Return to the UFC ===
It was announced on September 12 that Camozzi had re-signed with the UFC. He faced UFC newcomer Francis Carmont on October 29, 2011, at UFC 137. After a back and forth fight, Camozzi lost via unanimous decision.

In his next fight, Camozzi defeated Dustin Jacoby via third-round guillotine choke submission on January 28, 2012, at UFC on Fox 2.

Camozzi faced Nick Catone on June 22, 2012, at UFC on FX 4. In the third round, Camozzi struck Catone with a knee to the head opening a giant cut, causing the doctor to step in and force a TKO (doctor stoppage) at 1:51 of the third round.

Camozzi was expected to face Buddy Roberts on August 11, 2012, at UFC 150. However, Camozzi was injured and pulled out of the bout.

Camozzi fought Brazilian Luiz Cané on October 13, 2012, at UFC 153. He won the fight via unanimous decision.

Camozzi next faced Nick Ring on March 16, 2013, at UFC 158. He won the fight via split decision.

Camozzi was expected to face Cezar Ferreira on May 18, 2013, at UFC on FX 8, replacing an injured C.B. Dollaway. However, on April 7, Ferreira pulled out of the fight as well, citing an injury and was replaced by Rafael Natal. Then in early May, Camozzi was pulled from the matchup with Natal in favor of a matchup with Ronaldo Souza after Souza's scheduled opponent Costas Philippou pulled out of the bout with an injury. He lost the fight via technical submission due to an arm-triangle choke submission in the first round.

Camozzi next faced Lorenz Larkin on November 6, 2013, at UFC Fight Night 31. He lost the fight via unanimous decision.

Camozzi was expected to face Andrew Craig on April 11, 2014, at UFC Fight Night 39. However, the fight was cancelled on the day of the weigh-ins as Craig was ruled out with an illness.

Camozzi faced Bruno Santos on July 5, 2014, at UFC 175. He lost the fight via split decision.

A rescheduled bout with Rafael Natal took place on September 5, 2014, at UFC Fight Night 50. Natal defeated Camozzi via split decision.

After losing four consecutive fights Camozzi was released by the UFC for a second time.

=== Third UFC Stint ===
On the heels of two wins on the regional circuit, Camozzi replaced an injured Yoel Romero and faced Ronaldo Souza in a rematch on April 18, 2015, at UFC on Fox 15. He lost the fight via submission due to an armbar in the first round.

Camozzi faced Tom Watson on August 8, 2015, at UFC Fight Night 73. He won the fight by unanimous decision.

Camozzi next faced Joe Riggs on February 21, 2016, at UFC Fight Night 83. He won the fight via TKO in the first round due to a series of knees. He was also awarded a Performance of the Night bonus.

Camozzi faced Vitor Miranda on May 29, 2016, at UFC Fight Night 88. He won the fight by unanimous decision.

Camozzi faced Thales Leites on August 6, 2016, at UFC Fight Night 92. He lost the fight by submission due to a rear-naked choke in the third round.

Camozzi next faced Dan Kelly on November 27, 2016, at UFC Fight Night 101. He lost the fight via unanimous decision.

Camozzi was expected to face Magnus Cedenblad on May 28, 2017, at UFC Fight Night 109. However, Cedenblad was removed from the card on March 27 and replaced by Trevor Smith. He lost the fight by unanimous decision.

On June 2, 2017, Camozzi announced the expiry of his UFC contract and that he is now a free agent.

=== Absolute Championship Berkut ===
Camozzi was scheduled to face Thiago Silva on June 16, 2018, at ACB 88 in Brisbane, Australia. However, the fight got canceled two days before the event due to Silva's visa complications.

He then faced Muslim Magomedov at ACA 93: Balaev vs Zhamaldaev on March 16, 2019. He lost the fight via third-round stoppage.

He faced Tony Lopez at SCL 76 on September 6, 2019. He won the fight via first-round submission.

=== Professional Fighters League ===
Camozzi faced 2019 PFL Light Heavyweight tournament winner Emiliano Sordi on April 29, 2021, at PFL 2 as the start of the 2021 PFL Light Heavyweight tournament. He lost a close back and forth bout via unanimous decision.

Camozzi faced Cezar Ferreira at PFL 5 on June 17, 2021. He won the bout via unanimous decision.

Camozzi faced Cory Hendricks on August 27, 2021, at PFL 9. He won the fight via unanimous decision.

== Bare-knuckle fighting ==
=== Bare Knuckle Fighting Championship ===
In Camozzi's BKFC debut, he faced Bubba McDaniel on October 15, 2022 at BKFC 31 and won by first-round knockout.

Camozzi next faced Daniel Spohn on April 21, 2023 at BKFC 41 and won by knockout in the first round.

Camozzi faced Lorenzo Hunt for the BKFC Cruiserweight Championship at BKFC 50 on September 22, 2023 in the main event and lost by split decision.

Camozzi defeated Sawyer Depee by knockout in the first round to win the vacant BKFC Cruiserweight Championship on October 25, 2024 at BKFC 67 Denver: Camozzi vs. Depee in the main event.

Camozzi was scheduled to defend his title in a rematch against former champion Lorenzo Hunt on April 26, 2025 at BKFC 73 in the main event. On April 12, 2025, it was announced that Hunt sustained an injury and pulled out, while Camozzi was expected to face a new opponent. On April 15, 2025, it was announced that Camozzi would face Andrea Bicchi. Camozzi won the fight by unanimous decision.

Camozzi faced Alessio Sakara on October 25, 2025 at BKFC 83. He lost the championship by split decision.

Camozzi is scheduled to face Esteban Rodriguez for the interlim BKFC Cruiserweight Championship on April 17, 2026 at BKFC 88.

== Personal life ==
Camozzi previously owned and operated an MMA gear and clothing distribution company, Performance MMA, in Englewood, Colorado.

== Championships and accomplishments ==
- Ultimate Fighting Championship
  - Performance of the Night (One time) vs. Joe Riggs
- Prize Fighting Championship
  - Prize FC Middleweight Championship (One time)
  - One successful title defense
- Bare Knuckle Fighting Championship
  - BKFC Cruiserweight World Champion (One time, former)
    - One successful defense

== Mixed martial arts record ==
Professional record breakdown
42 matches	27 wins	15 losses
By knockout	7	1
By submission	8	6
By decision	12	8

Res.	Record	Opponent	Method	Event	Date	Round	Time	Location	Notes
Win	27–15	Cory Hendricks	Decision (unanimous)	PFL 9	August 27, 2021	3	5:00	Hollywood, Florida, United States	
Win	26–15	Cezar Ferreira	Decision (unanimous)	PFL 5	June 17, 2021	3	5:00	Atlantic City, New Jersey, United States	
Loss	25–15	Emiliano Sordi	Decision (unanimous)	PFL 2	April 29, 2021	3	5:00	Atlantic City, New Jersey, United States	
Win	25–14	Tony Lopez	Submission (arm-triangle choke)	SCL 76	September 6, 2019	1	3:11	Golden, Colorado, United States	
Loss	24–14	Muslim Magomedov	TKO (doctor stoppage)	ACA 93: Balaev vs Zhamaldaev	March 16, 2019	3	1:02	St. Petersburg, Russia	Light Heavyweight debut.
Loss	24–13	Trevor Smith	Decision (unanimous)	UFC Fight Night: Gustafsson vs. Teixeira	May 28, 2017	3	5:00	Stockholm, Sweden	
Loss	24–12	Dan Kelly	Decision (unanimous)	UFC Fight Night: Whittaker vs. Brunson	November 27, 2016	3	5:00	Melbourne, Australia	
Loss	24–11	Thales Leites	Submission (rear-naked choke)	UFC Fight Night: Rodríguez vs. Caceres	August 6, 2016	3	2:58	Salt Lake City, Utah, United States	
Win	24–10	Vitor Miranda	Decision (unanimous)	UFC Fight Night: Almeida vs. Garbrandt	May 29, 2016	3	5:00	Las Vegas, Nevada, United States	
Win	23–10	Joe Riggs	TKO (knees)	UFC Fight Night: Cowboy vs. Cowboy	February 21, 2016	1	0:26	Pittsburgh, Pennsylvania, United States	Performance of the Night.
Win	22–10	Tom Watson	Decision (unanimous)	UFC Fight Night: Teixeira vs. Saint Preux	August 8, 2015	3	5:00	Nashville, Tennessee, United States	Watson was deducted one point in round two for groin strikes.
Loss	21–10	Ronaldo Souza	Submission (armbar)	UFC on Fox: Machida vs. Rockhold	April 18, 2015	1	2:33	Newark, New Jersey, United States	
Win	21–9	Wes Swofford	TKO (leg kick)	Prize FC 8	March 6, 2015	1	1:25	Denver, Colorado, United States	Defended the Prize FC Middleweight Championship.
Win	20–9	Jeremy Kimball	Submission (rear-naked choke)	Prize FC 7: Rock N' Rumble	November 21, 2014	1	3:33	Denver, Colorado, United States	Won the Prize FC Middleweight Championship.
Loss	19–9	Rafael Natal	Decision (split)	UFC Fight Night: Jacare vs. Mousasi	September 5, 2014	3	5:00	Mashantucket, Connecticut, United States	
Loss	19–8	Bruno Santos	Decision (split)	UFC 175	July 5, 2014	3	5:00	Las Vegas, Nevada, United States	
Loss	19–7	Lorenz Larkin	Decision (unanimous)	UFC: Fight for the Troops 3	November 6, 2013	3	5:00	Fort Campbell, Kentucky, United States	
Loss	19–6	Ronaldo Souza	Technical Submission (arm-triangle choke)	UFC on FX: Belfort vs. Rockhold	May 18, 2013	1	3:37	Jaraguá do Sul, Brazil	
Win	19–5	Nick Ring	Decision (split)	UFC 158	March 16, 2013	3	5:00	Montreal, Quebec, Canada	
Win	18–5	Luiz Cané	Decision (unanimous)	UFC 153	October 13, 2012	3	5:00	Rio de Janeiro, Brazil	
Win	17–5	Nick Catone	TKO (doctor stoppage)	UFC on FX: Maynard vs. Guida	June 22, 2012	3	1:51	Atlantic City, New Jersey, United States	
Win	16–5	Dustin Jacoby	Submission (guillotine choke)	UFC on Fox: Evans vs. Davis	January 28, 2012	3	1:08	Chicago, Illinois, United States	
Loss	15–5	Francis Carmont	Decision (unanimous)	UFC 137	October 29, 2011	3	5:00	Las Vegas, Nevada, United States	
Win	15–4	Joey Villaseñor	Decision (split)	Shark Fights 15: Villaseñor vs Camozzi	May 27, 2011	3	5:00	Rio Rancho, New Mexico, United States	Initial result was incorrectly scored a draw.
Loss	14–4	Kyle Noke	Submission (rear-naked choke)	UFC 127	February 27, 2011	1	1:35	Sydney, Australia	
Win	14–3	Dongi Yang	Decision (split)	UFC 121	October 23, 2010	3	5:00	Anaheim, California, United States	
Win	13–3	James Hammortree	Decision (unanimous)	The Ultimate Fighter: Team Liddell vs. Team Ortiz Finale	June 19, 2010	3	5:00	Las Vegas, Nevada, United States	
Win	12–3	Chad Reiner	Submission (anaconda choke)	King of Champions: Rage	November 14, 2009	2	4:55	Denver, Colorado, United States	
Win	11–3	Darin Brudigan	Submission (triangle choke)	VFC 27: Mayhem	May 1, 2009	1	4:34	Council Bluffs, Iowa, United States	
Loss	10–3	Jesse Taylor	Decision (unanimous)	King of Champions: Shockwave 2009	March 28, 2009	3	5:00	Denver, Colorado, United States	For the King of Champions Middleweight Championship.
Win	10–2	Victor Moreno	Submission (guillotine choke)	MTXAFN 2: Evolution	January 9, 2009	2	0:31	Las Vegas, Nevada, United States	
Win	9–2	Elliot Duff	Decision (unanimous)	MFC 18: Famous	September 26, 2008	3	5:00	Edmonton, Alberta, Canada	
Loss	8–2	Nick Rossborough	Submission (triangle choke)	Premier Championship Fighting 3	June 21, 2008	3	2:46	Longmont, Colorado, United States	
Win	8–1	Dwayne Lewis	Decision (unanimous)	MFC 16: Anger Management	May 9, 2008	3	5:00	Edmonton, Alberta, Canada	
Loss	7–1	Jesse Forbes	Submission (armbar)	MFC 15: Rags to Riches	February 22, 2008	3	1:45	Edmonton, Alberta, Canada	
Win	7–0	Donnie Liles	TKO (punches)	Elite Fighting Extreme 1	November 10, 2007	1	4:58	Denver, Colorado, United States	
Win	6–0	Tony Barker	TKO (punches)	RMBB & PCF 1	October 16, 2007	2	2:22	Denver, Colorado, United States	
Win	5–0	Aaron Truxell	Submission (rear-naked choke)	Tap or Snap	August 18, 2007	1	1:45	Castle Rock, Colorado, United States	
Win	4–0	Spencer Hooker	Decision (split)	Kickdown Classic 37	May 12, 2007	3	5:00	Loveland, Colorado, United States	
Win	3–0	Joe Serna	Verbal Submission (knee injury)	RMBB: Nuclear Assault	March 17, 2007	2	0:50	Sheridan, Colorado, United States	
Win	2–0	Gary Borum	TKO (punches)	Kickdown Classic 35	March 2, 2007	1	3:19	Denver, Colorado, United States	
Win	1–0	Damon Clark	TKO (punches)	Kickdown Classic 27	July 15, 2006	1	3:03	Denver, Colorado, United States	

=== Mixed martial arts exhibition record ===
Exhibition record breakdown		
1 match	1 win	0 losses
By decision	1	0

Res.	Record	Opponent	Method	Event	Date	Round	Time	Location	Notes
Win	1–0	Victor O'Donnell	Decision (unanimous)	The Ultimate Fighter: Team Liddell vs. Team Ortiz	March 31, 2010 (air date)	3	5:00	Las Vegas, Nevada	Elimination bout.

== Kickboxing record ==
Professional kickboxing record
3 wins (2 KOs), 2 loss, 0 draw
Date	Result	Opponent	Event	Location	Method	Round	Time	Record
2018-11-02	Loss	(United States) Ryot Waller	Glory 72: Chicago	Chicago, Illinois, United States	Decision (Split)	3	3:00	3–2
2018-11-02	Win	(United States) Myron Dennis	Glory 61: New York	New York City, New York, United States	Decision (Unanimous)	3	3:00	3–1
2018-08-10	Win	(United States) John King	Glory 56: Denver	Broomfield, Colorado, United States	TKO (strikes)	2	2:48	2–1
2018-03-31	Loss	(United States) Mike Lemaire	Glory 52: Los Angeles	Los Angeles, California, United States	Decision (Unanimous)	3	3:00	1–1
2017-12-01	Win	(United States) Kyle Weickhardt	Glory 48: New York	New York City, New York United States	TKO (Corner Stoppage)	2	3:00	1–0
Legend: Win Loss Draw/No contest Notes

== Bare knuckle boxing record ==
Professional record breakdown
6 matches	4 wins	2 losses
By knockout	3	0
By decision	1	2

Res.	Record	Opponent	Method	Event	Date	Round	Time	Location	Notes
Loss	4–2	Alessio Sakara	Decision (split)	BKFC 83	October 25, 2025	5	2:00	Rome, Italy	Lost the BKFC Cruiserweight Championship.
Win	4–1	Andrea Bicchi	Decision (unanimous)	BKFC 73	April 26, 2025	5	2:00	Florence, Italy	Defended the BKFC Cruiserweight Championship.
Win	3–1	Sawyer Depee	KO	BKFC 67	October 25, 2024	1	1:06	Denver, Colorado, United States	Won the vacant BKFC Cruiserweight Championship.
Loss	2–1	Lorenzo Hunt	Decision (split)	BKFC 50	September 22, 2023	5	2:00	Denver, Colorado, United States	For the BKFC Cruiserweight Championship.
Win	2–0	Daniel Spohn	KO	BKFC 41	April 29, 2023	1	2:00	Broomfield, Colorado, United States	
Win	1–0	Bubba McDaniel	KO (punch)	BKFC 31	October 15, 2022	1	0:37	Broomfield, Colorado, United States	

== See also ==
- List of kickboxers
- List of male mixed martial artists
