= Alexey Kunchenko =

Russian mixed martial arts fighter

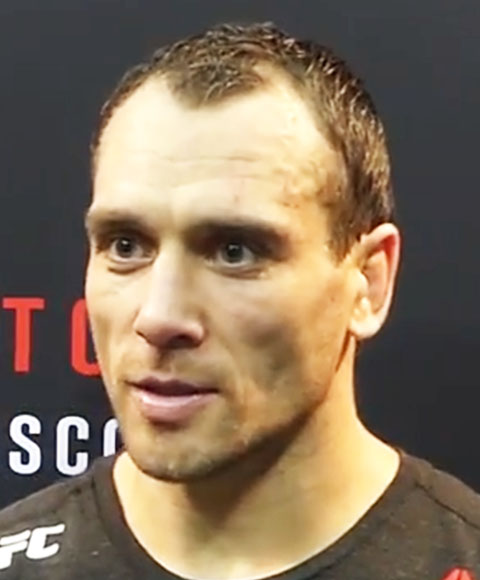
- Alexey Kunchenko at UFC Fight Night 136 in Moscow, Russia on Sep 15, 2018
- Born: May 2, 1984 (age 42); Prokopyevsk, Russia
- Other names: Wolverine
- Height: 5 ft 8 in (1.73 m)
- Weight: 170 lb (77 kg; 12 st 2 lb)
- Division: Welterweight
- Reach: 70 in (178 cm)
- Style: Muay Thai, ARB, Kickboxing
- Fighting out of: Tyumen, Russia
- Team: New Stream; Storm Fight Team; Boets MMA; Archangel Michael Fight Club
- Rank: Master of Sports in ARB
- Years active: 2013–2023

Mixed martial arts record
- Total: 31
- Wins: 25
- By knockout: 14
- By submission: 1
- By decision: 10
- Losses: 6
- By knockout: 1
- By decision: 5

Other information
- Mixed martial arts record from Sherdog

Alexey Andreevich Kunchenko (Russian: Алексей Андреевич Кунченко; born May 2, 1984) is a Russian mixed martial artist (MMA) who competes in the welterweight division. He is a former M-1 Global welterweight champion and competed in the Ultimate Fighting Championship (UFC) and Professional Fighters League (PFL).

== Mixed martial arts career ==
=== Early career ===
Kunchenko started his professional MMA career since 2013 and fought primary in Russia under various promoters, notably M-1 Global. He was the M-1 Global welterweight champion and amassed a record of 18-0 prior to being signed to the UFC.

=== Ultimate Fighting Championship ===
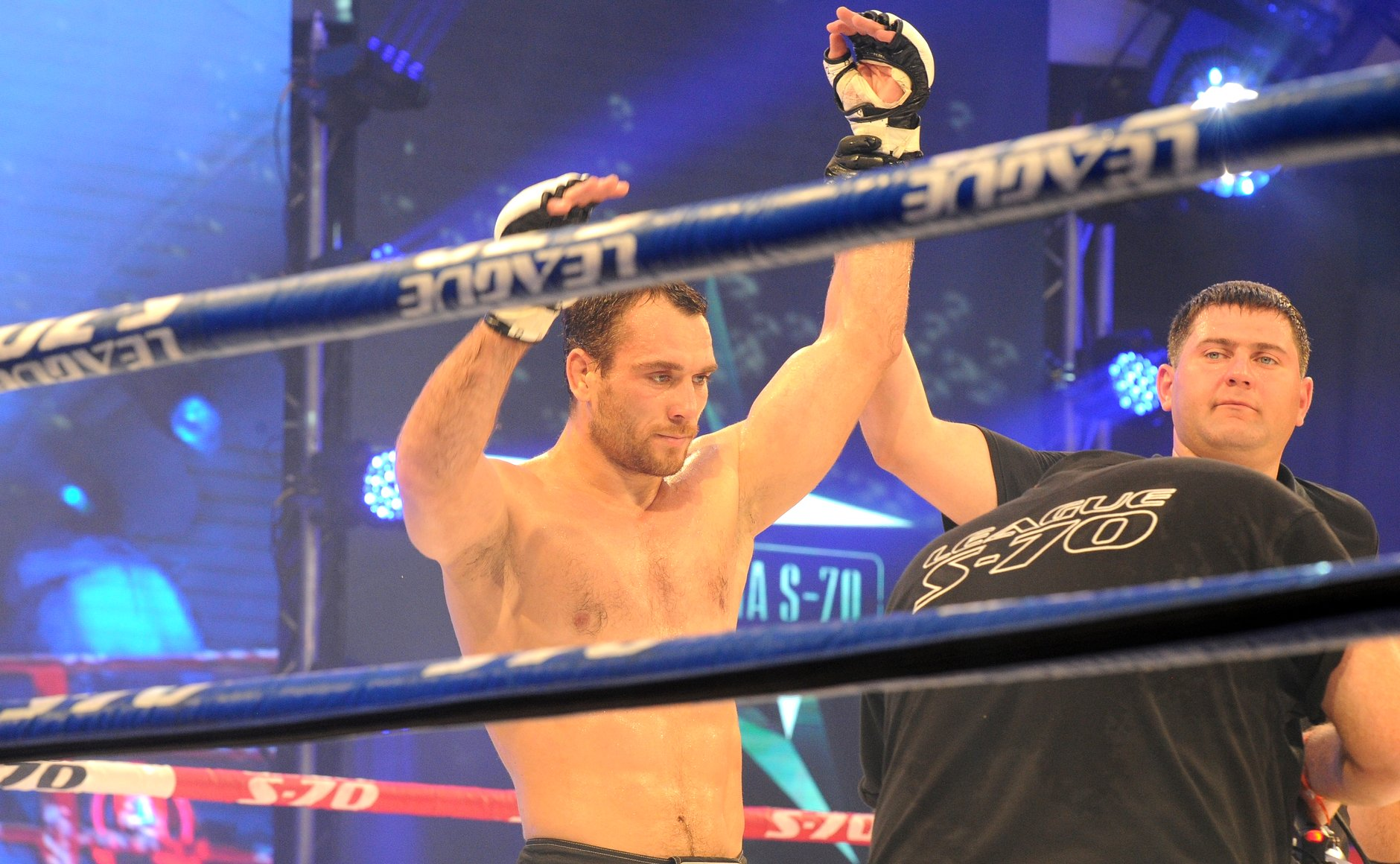
Alexey Kunchenko in the ring celebrating victory with both of his hands in the air

Kunchenko made his UFC debut on August 4, 2018, against Thiago Alves at UFC Fight Night: Hunt vs. Oleinik. He won the fight by unanimous decision.

His next fight came on December 1, 2018, at UFC Fight Night: dos Santos vs. Tuivasa against Yushin Okami. He won the fight via unanimous decision.

Kunchenko was scheduled to face Laureano Staropoli on August 10, 2019, at UFC Fight Night 156. However, it was announced on July 29, 2019, that Staropoli was forced to pull out of the fight due to a broken nose and was replaced by Gilbert Burns. Kunchenko lost the fight via unanimous decision.

Kunchenko faced Elizeu Zaleski dos Santos on March 14, 2020, at UFC Fight Night 170. He lost the fight via a controversial unanimous decision.

=== Professional Fighters League ===
On February 18, 2021, Kunchenko announced on his Instagram that he had signed a 5-fight contract with PFL for their 2021 season, and would be competing in the organization's welterweight division.

Kunchenko was set to face fellow UFC vet Gleison Tibau on April 29, 2021, at PFL 2 as the start of the 2021 PFL Welterweight tournament. On March 25, it was announced that Kunchenko pulled out of the bout.

Kunchenko faced Sadibou Sy at PFL 5 on June 17, 2021. He lost the bout via unanimous decision.

=== Post PFL ===
Kunchenko faced Magomedsaygid Alibekov on December 3, 2022, at RCC 13, losing the bout via split decision.

Kunchenko faced Gleison Tibau on February 11, 2023, at RCC, winning the bout via unanimous decision.

Kunchenko faced Shamil Musaev on July 28, 2023, at RCC 16, getting finished in the first round after a spinning back kick to the body and ground and pound. After the bout, Kunchenko announced his retirement. Despite the announcement, Kunchenko made his return to MMA competition in 2024.

== Championships and accomplishments ==
=== Mixed martial arts ===
- M-1 Global
  - M-1 Global Welterweight Champion (Four times)

== Mixed martial arts record ==
Professional record breakdown
32 matches	25 wins	7 losses
By knockout	14	1
By submission	1	0
By decision	10	6

Res.	Record	Opponent	Method	Event	Date	Round	Time	Location	Notes
Loss	25–6	Tagir Magomedov	Decision (split)	ACA 203	May 8, 2026	3	5:00	Tashkent, Uzbekistan	
Win	25–5	Oleg Dadonov	Decision (unanimous)	ACA 195	November 7, 2025	3	5:00	Saint Petersburg, Russia	
Win	24–5	Shakhban Alkhasov	TKO (punches)	Eagle FC 56	August 23, 2025	2	3:54	Kaspiysk, Russia	
Win	23–5	Luan Duarte	Decision (unanimous)	Modern Fighting Pankration 251 x Open FC 48	November 23, 2024	3	5:00	Khabarovsk, Russia	
Win	22–5	Danila Prikaza	Decision (split)	Open FC 43	June 8, 2024	3	5:00	Tyumen, Russia	
Loss	21–5	Shamil Musaev	TKO (spinning back kick and punches)	RCC 16	July 28, 2023	1	1:26	Tyumen, Russia	
Win	21–4	Gleison Tibau	Decision (unanimous)	RCC 14	February 11, 2023	3	5:00	Tyumen, Russia	
Loss	20–4	Magomedsaygid Alibekov	Decision (split)	RCC 13	December 3, 2022	3	5:00	Yekaterinburg, Russia	
Loss	20–3	Sadibou Sy	Decision (unanimous)	PFL 5 (2021)	June 17, 2021	3	5:00	Atlantic City, New Jersey, United States	
Loss	20–2	Elizeu Zaleski dos Santos	Decision (unanimous)	UFC Fight Night: Lee vs. Oliveira	March 14, 2020	3	5:00	Brasília, Brazil	
Loss	20–1	Gilbert Burns	Decision (unanimous)	UFC Fight Night: Shevchenko vs. Carmouche 2	August 10, 2019	3	5:00	Montevideo, Uruguay	
Win	20–0	Yushin Okami	Decision (unanimous)	UFC Fight Night: dos Santos vs. Tuivasa	December 1, 2018	3	5:00	Adelaide, Australia	
Win	19–0	Thiago Alves	Decision (unanimous)	UFC Fight Night: Hunt vs. Oleinik	September 15, 2018	3	5:00	Moscow, Russia	
Win	18–0	Alexander Butenko	TKO (punches and knees)	M-1 Challenge 90	March 28, 2018	3	4:04	Saint Petersburg, Russia	Defended the M-1 Global Welterweight Championship.
Win	17–0	Sergey Romanov	KO (punches)	M-1 Challenge 84	October 27, 2017	1	2:35	Saint Petersburg, Russia	Defended the M-1 Global Welterweight Championship.
Win	16–0	Maxim Grabovich	Decision (unanimous)	M-1 Challenge 75	March 3, 2017	5	5:00	Moscow, Russia	Defended the M-1 Global Welterweight Championship.
Win	15–0	Murad Abdulaev	Decision (unanimous)	M-1 Challenge 72	November 18, 2016	5	5:00	Moscow, Russia	Defended the M-1 Global Welterweight Championship.
Win	14–0	Eduardo Ramon	Decision (unanimous)	M-1 Challenge 70	September 10, 2016	3	5:00	Syktyvkar, Russia	Catchweight (174 lb) bout.
Win	13–0	Murad Abdulaev	TKO (punches)	M-1 Challenge 65	April 8, 2016	4	3:12	Saint Petersburg, Russia	Won the M-1 Global Welterweight Championship.
Win	12–0	Carlos Alexandre Pereira	TKO (punches)	Orenburg MMA Federation: Scythian Gold 2015	November 21, 2015	1	N/A	Orenburg, Russia	
Win	11–0	Alexandre Ramos	TKO (punches)	M-1 Challenge 62	October 10, 2015	1	4:32	Sochi, Russia	
Win	10–0	Ron Keslar	KO (punch)	League S-70: Plotforma Cup 2015	August 29, 2015	3	1:35	Sochi, Russia	
Win	9–0	Dez Parker	KO (punches)	M-1 Challenge 57	May 2, 2015	1	2:55	Orenburg, Russia	
Win	8–0	Grigoriy Kichigin	TKO (punches)	M-1 Challenge 54 & ACB 12	March 28, 2014	1	2:33	Saint Petersburg, Russia	
Win	7–0	Ronny Alexander Landaeta Utrera	Decision (unanimous)	Orenburg MMA Federation: Scythian Gold 2014	October 18, 2014	3	5:00	Orenburg, Russia	
Win	6–0	Adil Boranbayev	TKO (punches)	League S-70: Plotforma Cup 2014	August 9, 2014	2	4:46	Sochi, Russia	
Win	5–0	Felipe Salvador Nsue Ayiugono	TKO (punches)	Fight Nights: Battle of Moscow 16	July 11, 2014	2	4:05	Moscow, Russia	
Win	4–0	Anatoly Safronov	TKO (retirement)	M-1 Challenge 47	April 4, 2014	3	2:00	Moscow, Russia	
Win	3–0	Gennadiy Kovalev	TKO (punches)	Modern Fighting Pankration: Cup of Sakhalin 2014	March 8, 2014	2	4:13	Yuzhno-Sakhalinsk, Russia	Return to Welterweight.
Win	2–0	Jani Ridasmaa	TKO (corner stoppage)	Tyumen Fight Night: International Cup 1	August 4, 2013	2	N/A	Tyumen, Russia	Middleweight debut.
Win	1–0	Gasan Mamedov	Submission (rear-naked choke)	Nord Desant: North Landing Cup 2013	May 11, 2013	2	3:43	Khanty-Mansiysk, Russia	Welterweight debut.

== Professional kickboxing record ==
Professional Kickboxing Record
Date	Result	Opponent	Event	Location	Method	Round	Time
2011-02-26	Loss	(Russia) Alexander Stetsurenko	Ice Storm 3 (81 kg)	Nefteyugansk, Russia	Decision (Unanimous)	3	3:00
2009-10-17	Loss	(Czech Republic) Jiří Žák	Souboj Titánů	Plzeň, Czech Republic	Decision (Majority)	3	3:00
2009-02-19	Loss	(Belarus) Dmitry Shakuta	Tatneft Arena European Cup 2009, First Round (80 kg)	Kazan, Russia	Ext.R Decision (Unanimous)	4	3:00
Legend: Win Loss Draw/No contest Notes

== See also ==
- List of male mixed martial artists
