= Antônio Carlos Jr. =

Brazilian Jiu-Jitsu and mixed martial arts practitioner

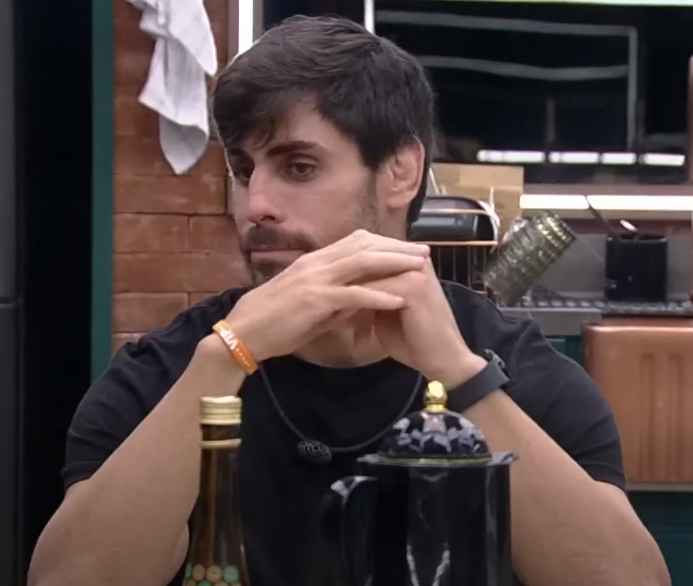
- Carlos Jr. in 2023
- Born: Antônio Carlos Coelho de Figueiredo Barbosa Júnior; 16 March 1990 (age 36); João Pessoa, Paraíba, Brazil
- Other names: Cara de Sapato ('Shoe Face')
- Height: 6 ft 2 in (188 cm)
- Weight: 205 lb (93 kg; 14 st 9 lb)
- Division: Heavyweight (2013–2014); Light Heavyweight (2014, 2021–present); Middleweight (2015–2021)
- Reach: 79 in (201 cm)
- Style: Brazilian Jiu-Jitsu, Muay Thai
- Fighting out of: Rio de Janeiro, Brazil
- Team: American Top Team (2015–present)
- Rank: Black belt in Brazilian Jiu-Jitsu under Hélder "Bob Esponja" Medeiros
- Years active: 2013–present

Mixed martial arts record
- Total: 27
- Wins: 19
- By submission: 13
- By decision: 6
- Losses: 6
- By knockout: 1
- By decision: 5
- No contests: 2

Other information
- Mixed martial arts record from Sherdog

Antônio Carlos Coelho de Figueiredo Barbosa Júnior (born 16 March 1990), also known as Antônio Carlos Jr. and professionally by his nickname Cara de Sapato (as well as its English translation Shoeface), is a Brazilian mixed martial artist who competes in the Light Heavyweight division and is currently signed to the Professional Fighters League (PFL), where he became champion in 2021, and again in 2025. As of January 27, 2026, he is #2 in the PFL light heavyweight rankings.

Carlos Jr. is most known for his time spent fighting in the Ultimate Fighting Championship (UFC), where he competed in the Light Heavyweight division in addition to Middleweight. A multiple time champion in Brazilian Jiu-Jitsu, Carlos Júnior was World Cup Champion in 2006 (at blue junior) and 2x World Champion in 2010 (weight and absolute at brown belt). He is the winner of The Ultimate Fighter: Brazil 3 Heavyweight tournament and the 2021 PFL Light Heavyweight Champion. In 2023, he was cast as contestant in the reality show Big Brother Brasil 23.

== Mixed martial arts career ==
=== The Ultimate Fighter ===
On 26 February 2014, it was revealed that Carlos Jr. was selected to be a participant on The Ultimate Fighter: Brazil 3. Cara de Sapato defeated Guilherme Viana via TKO (punches) to move into the Ultimate Fighter house, and become an official cast member.

Carlos Jr. was selected as the first pick (second overall) of coach Wanderlei Silva to be a part of Team Wanderlei. In his second Heavyweight fight of the season, Cara de Sapato was selected to fight Edgard Castaldelli Filho and won via knockout (punch) with only twelve seconds of fight in the first round. He was then scheduled to face Marcos Rogério de Lima for a spot in the final against Vitor Miranda He defeated Lima by submission (rear-naked choke).

=== Ultimate Fighting Championship (2014–2021) ===
Carlos Jr. made his promotional debut on 31 May 2014, at The Ultimate Fighter Brazil 3 Finale against Vitor Miranda to determine the winner of The Ultimate Fighter: Brazil 3 Heavyweight Tournament. He won the fight via unanimous decision.

Carlos Jr. made his light heavyweight debut against Patrick Cummins on 20 December 2014, at UFC Fight Night: Machida vs. Dollaway. He lost the one-sided fight by unanimous decision. After the defeat, he decided to move to the middleweight division for his next fight.

Carlos Jr. faced Eddie Gordon in a middleweight bout on 27 June 2015, at UFC Fight Night 70 He won the fight via submission in the third round.

Carlos Jr. faced Kevin Casey on 10 December 2015, at UFC Fight Night 80. The bout was deemed a No Contest just 11 seconds into the first round when Carlos Júnior accidentally poked Casey in both eyes and Casey was unable to continue.

Carlos Jr. next faced Dan Kelly on 20 March 2016, at UFC Fight Night 85. He lost the bout via TKO in the third round.

Carlos Jr. returned to face Leonardo Augusto Guimarães on 17 September 2016, at UFC Fight Night 94. He won the fight via submission in the third round.

Carlos Jr. faced Marvin Vettori on 30 December 2016, at UFC 207. He won the fight by unanimous decision.

Carlos Jr. faced Eric Spicely on 3 June 2017, at UFC 212. He won the fight by submission due to a rear-naked choke in the second round.

Carlos Jr. faced Jack Marshman on 28 October 2017, at UFC Fight Night 119. Carlos won the fight by submission due to a rear-naked choke in round one.

Carlos Jr. faced Tim Boetsch on 14 April 2018, at UFC on Fox 29. He won the fight via a rear-naked choke in round one.

Carlos Jr. was expected to face Derek Brunson on 4 August 2018, at UFC 227. However, Brunson pulled out of the fight in early July citing an eye injury. In turn, Carlos Jr. was removed from the card entirely and is expected to be rescheduled for a future event. Subsequently, Carlos Jr. was quickly rescheduled was expected to face Elias Theodorou on 22 September 2018, at UFC Fight Night 137. However, Carlos Jr. pulled out on 28 August due to injury. The pairing was expected to be left intact and was rescheduled for 8 December 2018, at UFC 231. On 13 September 2018, it was reported that Carlos Jr. withdrew from his bout with Theodorou yet again, citing a surgery is required on the injury that caused the cancellation of his first scheduled bout with Theodorou.

Carlos Jr. faced Ian Heinisch at UFC Fight Night: dos Anjos vs. Lee on 18 May 2019. He lost the fight via unanimous decision.

Carlos Jr. faced Uriah Hall on 14 September 2019, at UFC on ESPN+ 16. He lost the fight via split decision.

Carlos Jr. was scheduled to face Brad Tavares on 14 March 2020, at UFC Fight Night 170. However, Tavares was forced to pull out of the fight due to an anterior cruciate ligament (ACL) injury, and he was replaced by Makhmud Muradov. In turn, Carlos Jr. suffered from an unspecified injury and the bout was cancelled from the event. The bout with Brad Tavares was rescheduled for 24 January 2021, at UFC 257. Carlos Jr. lost the fight via unanimous decision.

On 4 February 2021, it was announced that Carlos Jr. was released from his UFC contract.

=== Professional Fighters League ===
==== 2021 Season ====
On 6 March 2021, it was announced by Carlos Jr.'s management that he had signed to the Professional Fighters League and would be competing in the 2021 season. He made his PFL debut against Tom Lawlor on 29 April 2021, at PFL 2. He won the bout via guillotine choke in the first round.

Carlos Jr. faced Vinny Magalhães at PFL 5 on 17 June 2021. Halfway through round one, Carlos Jr. hit Magalhães with an accidental knee to the groin, rendering him unable to continue. This led to the bout being declared a no contest.

Carlos Jr. faced Emiliano Sordi in the Semifinals off the Light Heavyweight tournament on 27 August 2021, at PFL 9. He won the bout via unanimous decision.

Carlos Jr. faced Marthin Hamlet in the Finals of the Light Heavyweight tournament on 27 October 2021, at PFL 10. He won the bout via rear-naked choke in the first round, winning the 2021 PFL Light Heavyweight Tournament and $1 million prize.

==== 2022 Season ====
Carlos Jr. faced Delan Monte on 20 April 2022, at PFL 1. He won 29 seconds into the bout via brabo choke.

Carlos Jr. faced Bruce Souto on 17 June 2022, at PFL 4. He won the bout via unanimous decision.

Carlos Jr. was scheduled to face Omari Akhmedov in the Semifinals off the Light Heavyweight tournament on 5 August 2022, at PFL 7. However, he suffered an ACL injury requiring surgery, sidelining him for the rest of the year.

==== 2024 Season ====
Carlos Jr. made his return against Simon Biyong on 12 April 2024 at PFL 2. He won the fight by a rear-naked choke submission.

Carlos Jr. next faced Alex Polizzi on 21 June 2024 at PFL 5, losing the bout via unanimous decision.

Carlos Jr. was scheduled to face Karl Albrektsson on 16 August 2024 at PFL 8. However the week of the bout, Albrektsson pulled out for unknown reasons.

==== 2025 Tournament ====
On 4 March 2025, the promotion officially revealed that Carlos Jr. joined the 2025 PFL Light Heavyweight Tournament.

In the quarterfinal, Carlos Jr. faced Karl Moore on 1 May 2025, at PFL 4. He won the fight by split decision.

In the semifinals, Carlos Jr. faced Simeon Powell at PFL 7 on June 27, 2025. He won the fight via unanimous decision.

In the finals, Carlos Jr. faced Sullivan Cauley on August 21, 2025, at PFL 10. He won the bout via submission in the second round.

== Championships and accomplishments ==
=== Mixed martial arts ===
- Ultimate Fighting Championship
  - The Ultimate Fighter: Brazil 3 Heavyweight Tournament Winner
  - Tied (Thales Leites, Rousimar Palhares & Demian Maia) for second most submissions in UFC Middleweight division history (5)
- Professional Fighters League
  - 2021 PFL Light Heavyweight Championship
  - 2025 PFL Light Heavyweight Championship

=== Brazilian jiu-jitsu ===
- 1st Place IBJJF Pan Championship (2012)
- 1st Place CBJJ Brazilian Nationals (2012)
- 2nd Place IBJJF Pan Championship (2012)
- 1st Place IBJJF World Championship (2010 brown belt)
- 1st Place CBJJ Brazilian Nationals (2011 / 2010 brown belt, 2009 /purple belt, 2008 blue belt)
- 1st Place CBJJ Brazilian Nationals Juvenile (2007)
- 1st Place IBJJF South American Championship (2008 purple belt, 2007 blue junior)
- 1st Place IBJJF South American Championship Juvenile (2007)
- 1st Place CBJJ Brazilian Team Nationals (2008 / 2007)

== Mixed martial arts record ==
Professional record breakdown
27 matches	19 wins	6 losses
By knockout	0	1
By submission	13	0
By decision	6	5
No contests	2	

Res.	Record	Opponent	Method	Event	Date	Round	Time	Location	Notes
Win	19–6 (2)	Sullivan Cauley	Submission (rear-naked choke)	PFL 10 (2025)	August 21, 2025	2	3:44	Hollywood, Florida, United States	Won the 2025 PFL Light Heavyweight Tournament.
Win	18–6 (2)	Simeon Powell	Decision (unanimous)	PFL 7 (2025)	June 27, 2025	3	5:00	Chicago, Illinois, United States	2025 PFL Light Heavyweight Tournament Semifinal.
Win	17–6 (2)	Karl Moore	Decision (split)	PFL 4 (2025)	1 May 2025	3	5:00	Orlando, Florida, United States	2025 PFL Light Heavyweight Tournament Quarterfinal.
Loss	16–6 (2)	Alex Polizzi	Decision (unanimous)	PFL 5 (2024)	21 June 2024	3	5:00	Salt Lake City, Utah, United States	
Win	16–5 (2)	Simon Biyong	Submission (rear-naked choke)	PFL 2 (2024)	12 April 2024	1	4:34	Las Vegas, Nevada, United States	
Win	15–5 (2)	Bruce Souto	Decision (unanimous)	PFL 4 (2022)	17 June 2022	3	5:00	Atlanta, Georgia, United States	
Win	14–5 (2)	Delan Monte	Submission (brabo choke)	PFL 1 (2022)	20 April 2022	1	0:29	Arlington, Texas, United States	
Win	13–5 (2)	Marthin Hamlet	Submission (rear-naked choke)	PFL 10 (2021)	27 October 2021	1	3:49	Hollywood, Florida, United States	Won the 2021 PFL Light Heavyweight Tournament.
Win	12–5 (2)	Emiliano Sordi	Decision (unanimous)	PFL 9 (2021)	27 August 2021	3	5:00	Hollywood, Florida, United States	2021 PFL Light Heavyweight Tournament Semifinal.
NC	11–5 (2)	Vinny Magalhães	NC (accidental knee to groin)	PFL 5 (2021)	17 June 2021	1	2:45	Atlantic City, New Jersey, United States	Accidental knee to the groin rendered Magalhães unable to continue.
Win	11–5 (1)	Tom Lawlor	Submission (guillotine choke)	PFL 2 (2021)	29 April 2021	1	4:43	Atlantic City, New Jersey, United States	Return to Light Heavyweight.
Loss	10–5 (1)	Brad Tavares	Decision (unanimous)	UFC 257	24 January 2021	3	5:00	Abu Dhabi, United Arab Emirates	
Loss	10–4 (1)	Uriah Hall	Decision (split)	UFC Fight Night: Cowboy vs. Gaethje	14 September 2019	3	5:00	Vancouver, British Columbia, Canada	
Loss	10–3 (1)	Ian Heinisch	Decision (unanimous)	UFC Fight Night: dos Anjos vs. Lee	18 May 2019	3	5:00	Rochester, New York, United States	
Win	10–2 (1)	Tim Boetsch	Submission (rear-naked choke)	UFC on Fox: Poirier vs. Gaethje	14 April 2018	1	4:28	Glendale, Arizona, United States	
Win	9–2 (1)	Jack Marshman	Submission (rear-naked choke)	UFC Fight Night: Brunson vs. Machida	28 October 2017	1	4:30	São Paulo, Brazil	
Win	8–2 (1)	Eric Spicely	Submission (rear-naked choke)	UFC 212	3 June 2017	2	3:49	Rio de Janeiro, Brazil	
Win	7–2 (1)	Marvin Vettori	Decision (unanimous)	UFC 207	30 December 2016	3	5:00	Las Vegas, Nevada, United States	
Win	6–2 (1)	Leonardo Augusto Guimarães	Submission (rear-naked choke)	UFC Fight Night: Poirier vs. Johnson	17 September 2016	3	4:46	Hidalgo, Texas, United States	Carlos Jr. was deducted one point in round 1 due to an illegal knee.
Loss	5–2 (1)	Dan Kelly	TKO (punches)	UFC Fight Night: Hunt vs. Mir	20 March 2016	3	1:36	Brisbane, Australia	
NC	5–1 (1)	Kevin Casey	NC (accidental eye poke)	UFC Fight Night: Namajunas vs. VanZant	10 December 2015	1	0:11	Las Vegas, Nevada, United States	Accidental eye poke rendered Casey unable to continue.
Win	5–1	Eddie Gordon	Submission (rear-naked choke)	UFC Fight Night: Machida vs. Romero	27 June 2015	3	4:37	Hollywood, Florida, United States	Middleweight debut.
Loss	4–1	Patrick Cummins	Decision (unanimous)	UFC Fight Night: Machida vs. Dollaway	20 December 2014	3	5:00	Barueri, Brazil	Light Heavyweight bout.
Win	4–0	Vitor Miranda	Decision (unanimous)	The Ultimate Fight Brazil 3 Finale: Miocic vs. Maldonado	31 May 2014	3	5:00	São Paulo, Brazil	Won The Ultimate Fighter: Brazil 3 Heavyweight Tournament.
Win	3–0	Ednaldo Novaes	Submission (armbar)	Champion Fights 2	26 October 2013	1	4:16	Salvador, Brazil	Heavyweight debut.
Win	2–0	Gerônimo Oliveira	Submission (arm-triangle choke)	Imperium: MMA Pro 6	14 September 2013	1	1:41	Feira de Santana, Brazil	
Win	1–0	Celivaldo da Silva	Submission (arm-triangle choke)	Nordeste MMA 1	20 July 2013	1	1:02	Salvador, Brazil	Light Heavyweight debut.

=== Mixed martial arts exhibition record ===
Exhibition record breakdown		
3 matches	3 wins	0 losses
By knockout	2	0
By submission	1	0

Res.	Record	Opponent	Method	Event	Date	Round	Time	Location	Notes
Win	3–0	Marcos Rogério de Lima	Submission (rear-naked choke)	The Ultimate Fighter: Brazil 3	18 May 2014 (airdate)	1	3:22	São Paulo, Brazil	The Ultimate Fighter: Brazil 3 semifinal round.
Win	2–0	Edgard Castaldelli Filho	KO (punch)	The Ultimate Fighter: Brazil 3	30 March 2014 (airdate)	1	0:12	São Paulo, Brazil	The Ultimate Fighter: Brazil 3 preliminary round.
Win	1–0	Guilherme Viana	TKO (punches)	The Ultimate Fighter: Brazil 3	9 March 2014 (airdate)	1	2:32	São Paulo, Brazil	The Ultimate Fighter: Brazil 3 elimination round.

== See also ==
- List of current PFL fighters
- List of male mixed martial artists
