= UFC Fight Night: Lewis vs. dos Santos =

UFC mixed martial arts event in 2019

- The poster for UFC Fight Night: Lewis vs. dos Santos
- Promotion: Ultimate Fighting Championship
- Date: March 9, 2019
- Venue: Intrust Bank Arena
- City: Wichita, Kansas
- Attendance: 7,265
- Total gate: $636,417

Event chronology
UFC 235: Jones vs. Smith	UFC Fight Night: Lewis vs. dos Santos	UFC Fight Night: Till vs. Masvidal

UFC Fight Night: Lewis vs. dos Santos (also known as UFC Fight Night 146 or UFC on ESPN+ 4) was a mixed martial arts event produced by the Ultimate Fighting Championship that was held on March 9, 2019 at Intrust Bank Arena in Wichita, Kansas.

== Background ==
The event marked the promotion's first visit to Kansas.

A heavyweight bout between former UFC Heavyweight Champion Junior dos Santos and former title challenger Derrick Lewis served as the event headliner.

As a result of the cancellation of UFC 233, the women's bantamweight bout between former Invicta FC Bantamweight Champion and UFC Women's Featherweight Championship challenger Yana Kunitskaya and Marion Reneau was rescheduled for this event.

Daniel Spitz was expected to fight Jeff Hughes at the event. However, Spitz pulled out of the bout on February 16 citing injury and was replaced by Maurice Greene. Hughes and Greene previously met in the regional circuit in April 2018.

== Results ==
Main Card (ESPN+)
Weight class				Method	Round	Time	Notes
Heavyweight	Junior dos Santos	def.	Derrick Lewis	TKO (punches)	2	1:58
Welterweight	Elizeu Zaleski dos Santos	def.	Curtis Millender	Submission (rear-naked choke)	1	2:35
Welterweight	Niko Price	def.	Tim Means	TKO (punches)	1	4:50
Heavyweight	Blagoy Ivanov	def.	Ben Rothwell	Decision (unanimous) (29–28, 29–28, 29–28)	3	5:00
Lightweight	Beneil Dariush	def.	Drew Dober	Submission (triangle armbar)	2	4:41
Middleweight	Omari Akhmedov	def.	Tim Boetsch	Decision (unanimous) (30–27, 30–27, 30–27)	3	5:00
Preliminary Card (ESPN+)
Welterweight	Anthony Rocco Martin	def.	Sérgio Moraes	Decision (unanimous) (30–27, 30–27, 30–27)	3	5:00
Women's Bantamweight	Yana Kunitskaya	def.	Marion Reneau	Decision (unanimous) (29–28, 29–28, 29–28)	3	5:00
Featherweight	Grant Dawson	def.	Julian Erosa	Decision (unanimous) (30–26, 30–27, 29–27)	3	5:00
Heavyweight	Maurice Greene	def.	Jeff Hughes	Decision (split) (29–28, 28–29, 29–28)	3	5:00
Bantamweight	Matt Schnell	def.	Louis Smolka	Submission (triangle choke)	1	3:18
Welterweight	Alex Morono	def.	Zak Ottow	TKO (Submission to elbows)	1	3:34
Lightweight	Alex White	def.	Dan Moret	Decision (unanimous) (29–28, 29–28, 29–28)	3	5:00

== Bonus awards ==
The following fighters received $50,000 bonuses:

- Fight of the Night: Junior dos Santos vs. Derrick Lewis
- Performance of the Night: Niko Price and Beneil Dariush

== See also ==
- List of UFC events
- 2019 in UFC
- List of current UFC fighters
