= Vitor Miranda =

Brazilian kickboxer and mixed martial artist (born 1979)

- Born: Vitor Bruno Soares Miranda; March 10, 1979 (age 47); Joinville, Santa Catarina, Brazil
- Other names: Vitinho, Lex Luthor
- Height: 6 ft 1 in (1.85 m)
- Weight: 84 kg (185 lb; 13.2 st)
- Division: Heavyweight (kickboxing); Heavyweight, middleweight (MMA)
- Reach: 77 in (196 cm)
- Style: Kickboxing, Muay Thai, Sanda, Savate
- Team: Team Nogueira
- Trainer: Alexandre Marciano
- Rank: Black belt in Muay Thai; Black sash in Sanda; Brown belt in Brazilian Jiu-Jitsu; Green belt in Judo; Silver glove in Savate
- Years active: 2001–2018

Kickboxing record
- Total: 32
- Wins: 23
- By knockout: 18
- Losses: 8
- By knockout: 1
- Draws: 1

Mixed martial arts record
- Total: 20
- Wins: 12
- By knockout: 9
- By submission: 2
- By decision: 1
- Losses: 8
- By submission: 1
- By decision: 7

Other information
- Mixed martial arts record from Sherdog
- Last updated on: November 9, 2015

Vitor Bruno Soares Miranda (born March 10, 1979) is a Brazilian former kickboxer and mixed martial artist. He was the K-1 Brazil 2005 and K-1 Turkey 2007 super heavyweight tournament champion.

== Biography ==
Vitor Miranda was born in Joinville, Santa Catarina, Brazil. When growing up, he was interested in martial arts but did not start training before turning 21, when his friend introduced him to Muay Thai.

Currently, Miranda trains in the U.S. at Imperial Athletics in Boca Raton, Florida.

== Kickboxing career ==
After only two years of practice and at the same time working part-time as a video store clerk, Miranda turned pro in 2001. He made his K-1 debut in 2003, quitting his job to become a full-time fighter.

Miranda's first K-1 fight was on February 23, 2003, at K-1 Brazil GP. He lost the fight against Carlos de Lima by unanimous decision. On October 22, 2005, he entered the K-1 Heavyweight Factory tournament in São Paulo and achieved the first success of his young career by winning the Grand Prix with three consecutive knockouts over Nelson Vargas, Lucio Silva and Asmir Burgic.

After two years of fighting in smaller shows in Brazil, Miranda was selected to participate in one of the regional K-1 qualifying tournaments, on November 2, 2007, in Istanbul, Turkey. In the quarterfinals he was matched up against local fan favorite Erhan Deniz. He won the hard fought battle by majority decision, as well as his other next two fights in the evening and was declared the K-1 Turkey champion. The win qualified him for K-1 European Elimination GP held on February 9, 2008, in Budapest, Hungary.

He defeated Tsotne Rogava by unanimous decision in the first round of the 2013 Tantneft Cup on February 23, 2013.

In the quarterfinals of the Tafneft Cup, he defeated Netherlands' Jantje Siersema by unanimous decision.

In the semifinals of the Tafneft Cup, Vitor Miranda faced the local Russia's fighter Mikhail Tyuterev. Miranda lost the fight via a controversial unanimous decision.

== Mixed martial arts career ==
=== Early career ===
Concurrent to his kickboxing career, Miranda made his professional MMA debut in November 2003. He fought in MMA sporadically over the next ten years, obtaining a record of 9 wins against 3 losses with all but one of his wins coming by way of a finish.

=== The Ultimate Fighter: Brazil ===
In February 2014, it was revealed that Miranda was chosen as a fighter to compete on The Ultimate Fighter: Brazil 3.

To get into the TUF house, Miranda defeated Bruno Silva via head-kick knockout. He was the second Heavyweight chosen to be on Team Sonnen. In his second fight on the show, he faced Antônio Branjão and won via TKO in the first round. In the semifinals, he faced Richardson Moreira and again won by TKO, this time in the second round.

=== Ultimate Fighting Championship ===
Having secured his place in the final, Miranda faced fellow finalist Antônio Carlos Júnior at the Ultimate Fighter: Brazil 3 finale on May 31, 2014. He lost the fight via unanimous decision.

Miranda faced promotional newcomer Jake Collier in a middleweight bout on December 20, 2014, at UFC Fight Night 58. He won the fight via knockout in the last second of the first round. The win also earned Miranda his first Performance of the Night bonus award.

Miranda was expected to face Nick Catone on April 18, 2015, at UFC on Fox 15. However, Catone abruptly announced his retirement on March 25, citing a litany of injuries and a history of chronic back pain. In turn, Miranda was also pulled from the card citing a rib injury.

Miranda faced Clint Hester on August 1, 2015, at UFC 190. He won the fight via TKO in the second round.

Miranda faced Marcelo Guimarães on March 5, 2016, at UFC 196. He won the fight via TKO in the second round.

Miranda faced Chris Camozzi on May 29, 2016, at UFC Fight Night 88. He lost the fight by unanimous decision.

Miranda faced Marvin Vettori on June 25, 2017, at UFC Fight Night 112. He lost the fight by unanimous decision.

Miranda faced promotional newcomer Julian Marquez on December 16, 2017, at UFC on Fox 26. However on December 4, it was announced that Miranda was pulled from the fight due to injury. He lost the fight via unanimous decision.

Miranda faced newcomer Abu Azaitar on July 22, 2018, on UFC Fight Night 134. He lost the fight by unanimous decision and was subsequently released from the promotion.

== Championships and achievements ==
=== Kickboxing ===
- 2007 K-1 Fighting Network Turkey champion
- 2005 K-1 Brazil Grand Prix in São Paulo champion
- 2004 K-1 Brazil Challenge runner up
- 2003 Storm Muay Thai Brazil champion
- 2003 South Brazilian Muay Thai champion
- 2002 Catarinense de Muay Thai champion
- 2002 Catarinense de Muay Thai champion

=== Mixed martial arts ===
- Ultimate Fighting Championship
  - The Ultimate Fighter: Brazil 3 Heavyweight Tournament Runner Up
  - Performance of the Night (One time) vs. Jake Collier

== Mixed martial arts record ==
Professional record breakdown
19 matches	12 wins	7 losses
By knockout	9	0
By submission	2	1
By decision	1	6

Res.	Record	Opponent	Method	Event	Date	Round	Time	Location	Notes
Loss	12–7	Abu Azaitar	Decision (unanimous)	UFC Fight Night: Shogun vs. Smith	July 22, 2018	3	5:00	Hamburg, Germany	
Loss	12–6	Marvin Vettori	Decision (unanimous)	UFC Fight Night: Chiesa vs. Lee	June 25, 2017	3	5:00	Oklahoma City, Oklahoma, United States	
Loss	12–5	Chris Camozzi	Decision (unanimous)	UFC Fight Night: Almeida vs. Garbrandt	May 29, 2016	3	5:00	Las Vegas, Nevada, United States	
Win	12–4	Marcelo Guimarães	TKO (head kick and punches)	UFC 196	March 5, 2016	2	1:09	Las Vegas, Nevada, United States	
Win	11–4	Clint Hester	TKO (punches and elbows)	UFC 190	August 1, 2015	2	2:38	Rio de Janeiro, Brazil	
Win	10–4	Jake Collier	TKO (head kick and punches)	UFC Fight Night: Machida vs. Dollaway	December 20, 2014	1	4:59	Barueri, Brazil	Middleweight debut. Performance of the Night.
Loss	9–4	Antônio Carlos Júnior	Decision (unanimous)	The Ultimate Fighter Brazil 3 Finale: Miocic vs. Maldonado	May 31, 2014	3	5:00	São Paulo, Brazil	Lost The Ultimate Fighter: Brazil 3 Heavyweight Tournament.
Win	9–3	João Paulo Pereira	TKO (knees and punches)	Nitrix Champion Fight 15	August 10, 2013	1	0:38	Joinville, Brazil	
Win	8–3	Elton Rodrigues	Submission (arm-triangle choke)	Mestre do Combate	November 22, 2012	1	4:23	Rio de Janeiro, Brazil	
Win	7–3	Eli Reger	TKO (punches)	Nitrix Champion Fight 11	May 5, 2012	1	3:32	Joinville, Brazil	
Win	6–3	Marcelo Cruz	Submission (rear-naked choke)	Top Fight Brasil	March 31, 2012	1	N/A	Goiânia, Brazil	
Loss	5–3	Guto Inocente	Submission (punches)	Shooto - Brazil 17	August 6, 2010	2	1:43	Rio de Janeiro, Brazil	
Win	5–2	Cassio Drummond	TKO (retirement)	Bitetti Combat 7	May 28, 2010	1	5:00	Rio de Janeiro, Brazil	
Loss	4–2	Fábio Maldonado	Decision (unanimous)	Bitetti Combat 4	September 12, 2009	3	5:00	Rio de Janeiro, Brazil	
Win	4–1	Renato Matos	TKO (knee)	Shooto - Brazil 11	March 28, 2009	1	0:15	Rio de Janeiro, Brazil	
Win	3–1	Gustavo Moia	KO (knee)	Shooto - Brazil 9	November 29, 2008	1	N/A	Fortaleza, Brazil	
Win	2–1	Sidney da Silva	KO (head kick)	Shooto - Brazil 8	August 30, 2008	2	0:45	Rio de Janeiro, Brazil	
Loss	1–1	Fábio Maldonado	Decision (unanimous)	Mo Team League 2	September 29, 2007	3	5:00	São Paulo, Brazil	
Win	1–0	Rivanildo Riva	Decision (unanimous)	K-1 MMA in Brazil	November 27, 2003	3	3:00	Curitiba, Brazil	

=== Mixed martial arts exhibition record ===
Exhibition record breakdown		
3 matches	3 wins	0 losses
By knockout	3	0

Res.	Record	Opponent	Method	Event	Date	Round	Time	Location	Notes
Win	3-0	Richardson Moreira	TKO (punches)	The Ultimate Fighter: Brazil 3	May 25, 2014 (airdate)	2	0:00	São Paulo, Brazil	TUF Br 3 semifinal round.
Win	2-0	Antônio Branjão	TKO (punches)	The Ultimate Fighter: Brazil 3	April 27, 2014 (airdate)	1	0:00	São Paulo, Brazil	TUF Br 3 preliminary round.
Win	1-0	Bruno Silva	KO (head kick)	The Ultimate Fighter: Brazil 3	March 9, 2014 (airdate)	2	0:00	São Paulo, Brazil	TUF Br 3 elimination round.

== Kickboxing record ==
24 Wins (18 (T)KO's, 4 Decisions), 8 Losses
Date	Result	Opponent	Event	Method	Round	Time
27/04/2013	Loss	(Russia) Mikhail Tyuterev	Tatneft Arena World Cup 2013 1/2 final (+91 kg), Kazan, Russia	Decision	4	3:00
27/04/2013	Win	(Netherlands) Jantje Siersema	Tatneft Arena World Cup 2013 2nd selection 1/4 final (+91 kg), Kazan, Russia	Decision (Unanimous)	4	3:00
23/02/2013	Win	(Ukraine) Tsotne Rogava	Tatneft Arena World Cup 2013 4th selection 1/8 final (+91 kg), Kazan, Russia	Decision (Unanimous)	4	3:00
11/06/2009	Loss	(Brazil) Thiago de Jesus Beowulf	Arena Brazil II, Sao Paulo, Brazil	Decision (Split)	5	3:00
05/30/2009	Win	(Brazil) Marco Rogério	V Desafio Profissional de Muay Thai, Pacaembu, Brazil	KO	2	
05/17/2008	Loss	(Bosnia and Herzegovina) Dzevad Poturak	K-1 Fighting Network Austria 2008, Austria	Decision	3	3:00
02/09/2008	Loss	(Azerbaijan) Zabit Samedov	K-1 World GP 2008 in Budapest, Hungary	Decision	3	3:00
11/02/2007	Win	(Germany) Karl Glyschinsky	K-1 Fighting Network Turkey 2007	TKO (Doctor stoppage)	1	3:00
11/02/2007	Win	(Bosnia and Herzegovina) Dzevad Poturak	K-1 Fighting Network Turkey 2007	KO	3	2:45
11/02/2007	Win	(Turkey) Erhan Deniz	K-1 Fighting Network Turkey 2007	Decision (Majority)	3	3:00
07/07/2007	Win	(Brazil) Guto Inocente	Shooto Brazil 3, Rio de Janeiro, Brazil	Decision	5	3:00
04/14/2007	Win	(Brazil) Guigao	Demolition V, São Paulo, Brazil	KO (Left body hook)	1	0:50
03/24/2007	Win	(Brazil) Ronaldo Leite	Shooto Brazil 2, Rio de Janeiro, Brazil	KO	3	4:17
03/10/2007	Win	(Brazil) Eduardo Maiorino	Floripa Fight 3, Florianópolis, Brazil	KO (Right hook)	1	3:00
12/17/2006	Win	(Slovenia) Dany Marhold	Jungle Fight 7, Ljubliana, Slovenia	KO (Left high kick)	1	2:15
09/23/2006	Win	(Brazil) Eduardo Maiorino	Demolition IV, São Paulo, Brazil	KO (Left high kick)	2	1:16
03/25/2006	Win	(Brazil) Cleber Adao	K-1 Rules Heavyweight Factory GP II, São Paulo, Brazil	KO (Left body hook)	2	1:43
10/22/2005	Win	(Germany) Asmir Burgic	K-1 Brazil Grand Prix 2005 in São Paulo, Brazil	KO (Left body hook)	2	2:38
10/22/2005	Win	(Brazil) Lucio de Freitas Silva	K-1 Brazil Grand Prix 2005 in São Paulo, Brazil	KO		
10/22/2005	Win	(Bolivia) Nelson Vargas	K-1 Brazil Grand Prix 2005 in São Paulo, Brazil	KO (Punches)	1	1:54
10/30/2004	Loss	(Brazil) Eduardo Maiorino	K-1 Brazil 2004 Challenge, Goiania, Brazil	Decision (Unanimous)	3	3:00
10/30/2004	Win	(Brazil) Dimirty Wanderlei	K-1 Brazil 2004 Challenge, Goiania, Brazil	KO	3	2:39
10/30/2004	Win	(Brazil) Flavio da Costa	K-1 Brazil 2004 Challenge, Goiania, Brazil	KO	1	1:15
06/26/2004	Win	(Japan) Great Kusatsu	K-1 Beast 2004 in Shizuoka, Japan	Decision (Unanimous)	3	3:00
09/13/2003	Loss	(Brazil) Assuério Silva	Stomp GP, Florianópolis, Brazil	Decision	5	3:00
02/23/2003	Loss	(Brazil) Jefferson Silva	K-1 World Grand Prix 2003 Preliminary Brazil, Brazil	KO	2	2:01
02/23/2003	Loss	(Brazil) Carlos Lima	K-1 World Grand Prix 2003 Preliminary Brazil, Brazil	Decision (Unanimous)	3	3:00

== See also ==
- List of current UFC fighters
- List of male mixed martial artists
- List of male kickboxers
- List of K-1 events
