= Rory MacDonald (fighter) =

Canadian mixed martial artist (born 1989)

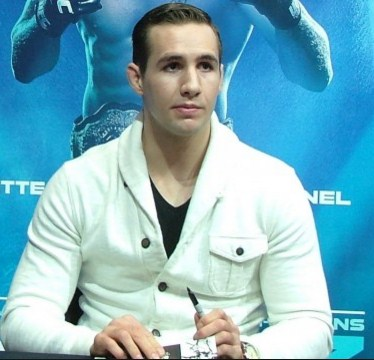
- Born: July 22, 1989 (age 37); Quesnel, British Columbia, Canada
- Other names: Red King, The Water Boy, Ares.
- Height: 6 ft 0 in (1.83 m)
- Weight: 170 lb (77 kg; 12 st 2 lb)
- Division: Lightweight (2005–2008); Welterweight (2009–2022); Middleweight (2018)
- Reach: 76 in (193 cm)
- Stance: Orthodox
- Fighting out of: Montreal, Quebec, Canada
- Team: Tristar Gym (2007–present); Toshido MMA (2003–present); Sanford MMA (2020–2022)
- Rank: Black belt in Brazilian Jiu-Jitsu under David Lea
- Years active: 2005–2022

Mixed martial arts record
- Total: 34
- Wins: 23
- By knockout: 7
- By submission: 9
- By decision: 7
- Losses: 10
- By knockout: 4
- By decision: 6
- Draws: 1

Other information
- Mixed martial arts record from Sherdog

Rory MacDonald (born July 22, 1989) is a Canadian former mixed martial artist who most recently competed in the welterweight division of the Professional Fighters League (PFL). Prior to signing with the PFL, MacDonald competed for Bellator MMA, where he is a former Bellator Welterweight World Champion. Having been a professional competitor since 2005, MacDonald was a top contender in the UFC with an overall UFC record of 9–4. He challenged for the UFC Welterweight Championship at UFC 189 against then-champion Robbie Lawler in a bout widely considered one of the greatest of all time and for which both fighters were inducted into the UFC Hall of Fame. He is also a former King of the Cage Lightweight Champion.

== Mixed martial arts career ==
MacDonald's interest in MMA originated watching early UFC tapes with his dad and brother as a child. After discovering an MMA gym near him, MacDonald started his training with David Lea at the age of 14 and his fight team Toshido Fighting Arts Academy out of Kelowna, British Columbia. He soon quit all other sports and began pursuing a career as a professional fighter. MacDonald described himself as a scrawny, timid kid who "wasn't the type to get involved in fights at school." He made his professional debut at the age of sixteen, winning in the first round by submission against Terry Thiara at an Extreme Fighting Challenge event via rear naked choke.

=== King of the Cage ===
He then moved to 2–0, by beating Ken Tran in his King of the Cage (KOTC) debut. He won a fight in Rumble in the Cage and then signed exclusively with King of the Cage. He won two fights after signing and was then rewarded with a shot at the KOTC Canadian Lightweight title, against Kajan Johnson, which MacDonald won. MacDonald then was awarded a shot at the King of the Cage Lightweight Championship, against Clay French, MacDonald knocked him out in the second round. After the fight MacDonald moved up to welterweight and defeated Elmer Waterhen by first round armbar.

=== Ultimate Fighting Championship ===
MacDonald was signed to the UFC after compiling a 9–0 professional record. By the time he signed with the UFC he was regarded as a teenage prodigy and leading figure of the next generation of MMA fighters, who specifically trained MMA as a discipline instead of transitioning over from a traditional background.

He debuted for the promotion at UFC Fight Night 20 against Mike Guymon. Guymon dropped MacDonald with a right cross, before MacDonald quickly recovered, took Guymon down and won the fight with an armbar submission in the first round.

MacDonald lost to Carlos Condit via third-round TKO at UFC 115 in a bout that earned the Fight of the Night award. MacDonald was competitive in the first two rounds using effective striking and taking Condit down three times. Condit came back with a more aggressive attitude in the final round and finished MacDonald with a combination of elbows and punches. After the fight, the judges' scorecards were revealed and showed that had MacDonald not been finished in the last seven seconds, he would have picked up a split decision victory. After this loss, Macdonald moved to Montreal and joined Tristar Gym, home of elite fighters such as former UFC Welterweight Champion Georges St-Pierre.

MacDonald was expected to face Matt Brown on November 20, 2010, at UFC 123, but was forced from the card with an injury and replaced by Brian Foster.

MacDonald was expected to face James Wilks on April 30, 2011, at UFC 129. However, Wilks was replaced on the card by Nate Diaz. MacDonald dominated Diaz during all three rounds (throwing Diaz via German Suplex three times in the third round) and earning a unanimous decision victory.

MacDonald next faced and defeated Mike Pyle by TKO in the first round on August 6, 2011, at UFC 133.

MacDonald was expected to face Brian Ebersole on December 10, 2011, at UFC 140. However, MacDonald pulled out of the bout with an injury and was replaced by Claude Patrick.

MacDonald was scheduled to face Che Mills at UFC 145 on March 24, 2012. However, the event was initially cancelled and then moved from Montreal to take place in Atlanta, Georgia on April 21, 2012. MacDonald won the bout via second-round TKO. After getting hit with hard shots in the first round, MacDonald took the fight to the ground, where he controlled the fight with his superior wrestling and ground and pound.

MacDonald was expected to face B.J. Penn on September 22, 2012, at UFC 152. However, MacDonald pulled out of the bout after sustaining a cut to the forehead while training. The fight eventually took place on December 8, 2012, at UFC on Fox 5. MacDonald dominated Penn for three rounds and won by unanimous decision.

MacDonald was expected to face Carlos Condit in a rematch on March 16, 2013, at UFC 158. However, MacDonald pulled out of the bout citing another injury, and was replaced by Johny Hendricks.

MacDonald defeated Jake Ellenberger by unanimous decision on July 27, 2013, at UFC on Fox 8. He used his size and reach advantage to repeatedly land his jab, neutralizing the shorter Ellenberger. UFC president Dana White criticized the performance as "lackluster".

MacDonald next lost a split decision to Robbie Lawler at UFC 167.

==== Rise into title contention ====
MacDonald beat Demian Maia by unanimous decision on February 22, 2014, at UFC 170, earning his second Fight of the Night bonus award. MacDonald almost had to pull out of this fight after stabbing himself in the hand while cutting an avocado.

MacDonald defeated Tyron Woodley by unanimous decision in the co-main event of UFC 174 on June 14, 2014.

MacDonald scored a third-round TKO on Tarec Saffiedine on October 4, 2014, at UFC Fight Night 54. This earned his first Performance of the Night bonus award.

MacDonald was expected to face Hector Lombard on April 25, 2015, at UFC 186. However, on February 10, the UFC indicated that both participants had been removed from the card and that the pairing had been scrapped as both fighters are expected to be rebooked against a new opponent.

A rematch with then champion Robbie Lawler took place on July 11, 2015, at UFC 189. MacDonald lost the fight via TKO in the fifth round. The back and forth action earned both participants Fight of the Night honors. The fight was considered an instant classic by fans and media alike with UFC President Dana White hailing it as one of the best welterweight fights in the promotion's history.

MacDonald next faced Stephen Thompson on June 18, 2016, at UFC Fight Night 89. He lost the fight via unanimous decision.

On April 8, 2023, it was announced that MacDonald will be inducted to the UFC Fight Wing Hall of Fame in July 2023 for the welterweight title bout from July 2015.

=== Bellator MMA ===
On August 26, 2016, MacDonald signed a contract with Bellator MMA. He subsequently appeared at Bellator 160 and announced his intentions to win both the welterweight and middleweight championships. In his Bellator debut, MacDonald fought Paul Daley in the main event at Bellator 179 on May 19, 2017. He won the one-sided fight via rear-naked choke in the second round.

==== Bellator Welterweight Champion ====
MacDonald faced Bellator MMA welterweight champion Douglas Lima at Bellator 192 on January 20, 2018. He won the back-and-forth fight by unanimous decision. He sustained an injury with a big swelling on the shin of his left leg, midway through the fight.

MacDonald moved up and challenged Gegard Mousasi for the Bellator Middleweight Championship on September 29, 2018, at Bellator 206. He lost the fight via technical knockout in round two.

MacDonald next defended his Welterweight title against Jon Fitch in a fight that is simultaneously the first round of Bellator Welterweight World Grand Prix at Bellator 220 on April 27, 2019. The back-and-forth bout ended in a majority draw. Due to the fight ending in a draw, Macdonald retained the title and advanced to the semifinals against Neiman Gracie. MacDonald faced Gracie in the main event at Bellator 222 on June 14, 2019. He won the fight by unanimous decision.

In the Bellator Welterweight World Grand Prix final, MacDonald faced Douglas Lima in a rematch at Bellator 232 on October 26, 2019. He lost the fight and title via unanimous decision.

=== Professional Fighters League ===
==== PFL season 2021 ====
On December 18, 2019, it was announced that MacDonald had signed with the Professional Fighters League. After a year-long layoff, mainly due to PFL not running events in 2020 due to the COVID-19 pandemic, MacDonald was set to make his promotional debut on April 29, 2021, against David Michaud as the start of the 2021 PFL Welterweight tournament. On April 8, David announced he pulled out of the PFL season due to a heart condition. He was replaced by Bellator and UFC vet Curtis Millender. MacDonald won the bout in the first round via rear-naked choke.

MacDonald faced Gleison Tibau at PFL 5 on June 17, 2021. He lost the bout by a controversial split decision, with the vast majority of media scores and other professional MMA fighters scoring the bout as a win for MacDonald.

MacDonald faced Ray Cooper III in the semifinals of the Welterweight tournament on August 13, 2021, at PFL 7. He lost the bout via unanimous decision.

==== PFL season 2022 ====
MacDonald faced Brett Cooper on May 6, 2022, at PFL 3. MacDonald won the bout in the first round via rear-naked choke.

MacDonald faced Sadibou Sy on July 1, 2022, at PFL 6. In an upset, MacDonald lost the bout via unanimous decision.

MacDonald was scheduled to face Magomed Umalatov in the Semifinals of the Welterweight tournament on August 13, 2022, at PFL 8. However, after Umalatov was forced to pull out due to visa issues, he was replaced by Dilano Taylor. MacDonald lost the bout via TKO stoppage in the first round.

=== Retirement ===
On August 14, 2022, MacDonald announced his retirement from MMA competition. On July 29, 2025, MacDonald cited burnout and disappointment as the main factors behind his early retirement, but teased a potential return to MMA.

== Submission grappling career ==
On November 22, 2014, MacDonald fought to a draw against Jonathan Torres in a grappling match in Metamoris V.

MacDonald announced in 2024 that he was going to release a series of submission grappling instructionals with BJJ Fanatics.

== Personal life ==
In September 2014, it was revealed that an anonymous fan had picked MacDonald's walkout music for several years until UFC 145. According to MacDonald, he had changed phone numbers after moving to Montreal and the producer who arranged entrance music continued to unknowingly text his previous phone number. MacDonald also explained that he had been too focused on training to think of walkout music. Unaware that MacDonald was not the one making the song choices, the producer approached MacDonald in-person to tell him they could not use a song by Nickelback that the fan had chosen, revealing the ruse. The last choice the fan made was "U Can't Touch This" by MC Hammer at UFC 133, which MacDonald called his worst walkout song. MacDonald later chose "We Found Love" by Rihanna for his fight against Lawler at UFC 167.

MacDonald is of Scottish, Irish and Norwegian descent. He was raised Catholic, but has said he left the faith early in his life. In 2019, he became a Born Again Christian after an encounter with God.

MacDonald and his wife Olivia have a daughter and a son.

== Championships and accomplishments ==
=== Mixed martial arts ===
- Bellator MMA
  - Bellator Welterweight World Championship (One time)
    - Two successful title defenses
  - Bellator Welterweight World Grand Prix runner-up
- Canadian Pro-Wrestling Hall of Fame
  - Class of 2023 (MMA Wing)
- Ultimate Fighting Championship
  - UFC Hall of Fame (Fight Wing, Class of 2023) vs. Robbie Lawler 2 at UFC 189
  - Fight of the Night (Three times) vs. Carlos Condit, Demian Maia and Robbie Lawler
  - Performance of the Night (One time) vs. Tarec Saffiedine
  - UFC.com Awards
    - 2010: Ranked #9 Newcomer of the Year & Ranked #6 Fight of the Year vs. Carlos Condit
    - 2014: Ranked #5 Fighter of the Year
    - 2015: Fight of the Year vs. Robbie Lawler 2
- King of the Cage
  - KOTC Lightweight Championship (One time)
  - KOTC Canadian Lightweight Championship (One time)
- RotoWire
  - 2010s Fight of the Decade vs. Robbie Lawler 2 at UFC 189
- Bleacher Report
  - 2015 Fight of the Year vs. Robbie Lawler 2 at UFC 189
- MMA Junkie
  - 2014 February Fight of the Month vs. Demian Maia
  - 2015 July Fight of the Month vs. Robbie Lawler 2 at UFC 189
  - 2015 Fight of the Year vs. Robbie Lawler 2 at UFC 189
- Top MMA News
  - Canadian Fighter of the Year (2012)
- Wrestling Observer Newsletter
  - MMA Match of the Year (2015) vs. Robbie Lawler 2 at UFC 189
- World MMA Awards
  - 2015 Fight of the Year vs. Robbie Lawler 2 at UFC 189
- MMA Fighting
  - 2015 Fight of the Year vs. Robbie Lawler 2 at UFC 189
  - 2010s Fight of the Decade vs. Robbie Lawler 2 at UFC 189
- Yahoo Sports
  - 2015 Fight of the Year vs. Robbie Lawler 2 at UFC 189
- MMA Mania
  - 2015 Fight of the Year vs. Robbie Lawler 2 at UFC 189
- Sherdog
  - 2015 Fight of the Year vs. Robbie Lawler 2 at UFC 189
- Combat Press
  - 2015 Fight of the Year vs. Robbie Lawler 2 at UFC 189
- MMA Weekly
  - 2015 Fight of the Year vs. Robbie Lawler 2 at UFC 189

== Mixed martial arts record ==
Professional record breakdown
| 34 matches | 23 wins | 10 losses |
| By knockout | 7 | 4 |
| By submission | 9 | 0 |
| By decision | 7 | 6 |
| Draws | 1 | |

| Res. | Record | Opponent | Method | Event | Date | Round | Time | Location | Notes |
|---|---|---|---|---|---|---|---|---|---|
| Loss | 23–10–1 | Dilano Taylor | TKO (punches) | PFL 8 (2022) | August 13, 2022 | 1 | 3:59 | Cardiff, Wales | 2022 PFL Welterweight Tournament Semifinal. |
| Loss | 23–9–1 | Sadibou Sy | Decision (unanimous) | PFL 6 (2022) | July 1, 2022 | 3 | 5:00 | Atlanta, Georgia, United States | |
| Win | 23–8–1 | Brett Cooper | Submission (rear-naked choke) | PFL 3 (2022) | May 6, 2022 | 1 | 2:23 | Arlington, Texas, United States | |
| Loss | 22–8–1 | Ray Cooper III | Decision (unanimous) | PFL 7 (2021) | August 13, 2021 | 3 | 5:00 | Hollywood, Florida, United States | 2021 PFL Welterweight Tournament Semifinal. |
| Loss | 22–7–1 | Gleison Tibau | Decision (split) | PFL 5 (2021) | June 17, 2021 | 3 | 5:00 | Atlantic City, New Jersey, United States | |
| Win | 22–6–1 | Curtis Millender | Submission (rear-naked choke) | PFL 2 (2021) | April 29, 2021 | 1 | 3:38 | Atlantic City, New Jersey, United States | |
| Loss | 21–6–1 | Douglas Lima | Decision (unanimous) | Bellator 232 | October 26, 2019 | 5 | 5:00 | Uncasville, Connecticut, United States | Bellator Welterweight World Grand Prix Final. Lost the Bellator Welterweight World Championship. |
| Win | 21–5–1 | Neiman Gracie | Decision (unanimous) | Bellator 222 | June 14, 2019 | 5 | 5:00 | New York City, New York, United States | Bellator Welterweight World Grand Prix Semifinal. Defended the Bellator Welterweight World Championship. |
| Draw | 20–5–1 | Jon Fitch | Draw (majority) | Bellator 220 | April 27, 2019 | 5 | 5:00 | San Jose, California, United States | Bellator Welterweight World Grand Prix Quarterfinal. Retained the Bellator Welterweight World Championship. |
| Loss | 20–5 | Gegard Mousasi | TKO (punches and elbows) | Bellator 206 | September 29, 2018 | 2 | 3:23 | San Jose, California, United States | Middleweight debut. For the Bellator Middleweight World Championship. |
| Win | 20–4 | Douglas Lima | Decision (unanimous) | Bellator 192 | January 20, 2018 | 5 | 5:00 | Inglewood, California, United States | Won the Bellator Welterweight World Championship. |
| Win | 19–4 | Paul Daley | Submission (rear-naked choke) | Bellator 179 | May 19, 2017 | 2 | 1:45 | London, England | |
| Loss | 18–4 | Stephen Thompson | Decision (unanimous) | UFC Fight Night: MacDonald vs. Thompson | June 18, 2016 | 5 | 5:00 | Ottawa, Ontario, Canada | |
| Loss | 18–3 | Robbie Lawler | TKO (punches) | UFC 189 | July 11, 2015 | 5 | 1:00 | Las Vegas, Nevada, United States | For the UFC Welterweight Championship. Fight of the Night. Fight of the Year (2015). UFC Hall of Fame Fight (Inducted on July 6th, 2023) |
| Win | 18–2 | Tarec Saffiedine | TKO (punches) | UFC Fight Night: MacDonald vs. Saffiedine | October 4, 2014 | 3 | 1:28 | Halifax, Nova Scotia, Canada | Performance of the Night. |
| Win | 17–2 | Tyron Woodley | Decision (unanimous) | UFC 174 | June 14, 2014 | 3 | 5:00 | Vancouver, British Columbia, Canada | |
| Win | 16–2 | Demian Maia | Decision (unanimous) | UFC 170 | February 22, 2014 | 3 | 5:00 | Las Vegas, Nevada, United States | Fight of the Night. |
| Loss | 15–2 | Robbie Lawler | Decision (split) | UFC 167 | November 16, 2013 | 3 | 5:00 | Las Vegas, Nevada, United States | |
| Win | 15–1 | Jake Ellenberger | Decision (unanimous) | UFC on Fox: Johnson vs. Moraga | July 27, 2013 | 3 | 5:00 | Seattle, Washington, United States | |
| Win | 14–1 | B.J. Penn | Decision (unanimous) | UFC on Fox: Henderson vs. Diaz | December 8, 2012 | 3 | 5:00 | Seattle, Washington, United States | |
| Win | 13–1 | Che Mills | TKO (punches) | UFC 145 | April 21, 2012 | 2 | 2:20 | Atlanta, Georgia, United States | |
| Win | 12–1 | Mike Pyle | TKO (punches) | UFC 133 | August 6, 2011 | 1 | 3:54 | Philadelphia, Pennsylvania, United States | |
| Win | 11–1 | Nate Diaz | Decision (unanimous) | UFC 129 | April 30, 2011 | 3 | 5:00 | Toronto, Ontario, Canada | |
| Loss | 10–1 | Carlos Condit | TKO (punches) | UFC 115 | June 12, 2010 | 3 | 4:53 | Vancouver, British Columbia, Canada | Fight of the Night. |
| Win | 10–0 | Mike Guymon | Submission (armbar) | UFC Fight Night: Maynard vs. Diaz | January 11, 2010 | 1 | 4:27 | Fairfax, Virginia, United States | |
| Win | 9–0 | Nick Hinchliffe | KO (punches) | KOTC Canada: Disturbed | September 26, 2009 | 2 | 2:08 | Edmonton, Alberta, Canada | |
| Win | 8–0 | Elmer Waterhen | Submission (armbar) | KOTC Canada: Island Pride | May 8, 2009 | 1 | 1:27 | Nanaimo, British Columbia, Canada | Welterweight debut. |
| Win | 7–0 | Clay French | KO (punches) | KOTC Canada: Grinder | November 28, 2008 | 2 | 4:26 | Calgary, Alberta, Canada | Won the KOTC Lightweight Championship. |
| Win | 6–0 | Kajan Johnson | TKO (elbows and punches) | KOTC Canada: Avalanche | December 15, 2007 | 3 | 1:48 | Moncton, New Brunswick, Canada | Won the KOTC Canadian Lightweight Championship. |
| Win | 5–0 | Yoon Heo | TKO (knees) | KOTC Canada: Icebreaker | November 3, 2006 | 2 | 0:19 | Prince George, British Columbia, Canada | |
| Win | 4–0 | Quinton Moreno | Submission (triangle choke) | KOTC Canada: Insurrection | October 6, 2006 | 1 | N/A | Vernon, British Columbia, Canada | |
| Win | 3–0 | Jordan Mein | Submission (rear-naked choke) | Rumble in the Cage 17 | June 17, 2006 | 1 | 4:04 | Lethbridge, Alberta, Canada | |
| Win | 2–0 | Ken Tran | Submission (rear-naked choke) | KOTC Canada: Anarchy | February 11, 2006 | 1 | 2:33 | Prince George, British Columbia, Canada | |
| Win | 1–0 | Terry Thiara | Submission (rear-naked choke) | Extreme Fighting Challenge 4 | October 15, 2005 | 1 | 2:11 | Prince George, British Columbia, Canada | |

== See also ==
- List of male mixed martial artists
- List of Canadian UFC fighters
