= PFL 2 (2021) =

Professional Fighters League mixed martial arts event in 2021

- The poster for PFL 2
- Promotion: Professional Fighters League
- Date: April 29, 2021
- Venue: Ocean Casino Resort
- City: Atlantic City, New Jersey, United States
- Estimated viewers: 136,000

Event chronology
| PFL 1 | PFL 2 | PFL 3 |

The PFL 2 mixed martial arts event for the 2021 season of the Professional Fighters League was held on April 29, 2021. This was the second regular season event of the tournament and included fights in the Welterweight and Light heavyweight divisions.

== Background ==
The event was to be headlined by a welterweight clash between the former UFC title contender and Bellator welterweight champion Rory MacDonald and the former UFC veteran David Michaud. On April 8, Michaud announced that he had to pull out of the bout due to medicals discovering a congenital heart condition, congenital bicuspid aortic valve with dilated aortic root, which put him at risk of aortic dissection. His future in MMA is also uncertain. He was replaced for the season by Curtis Millender.

In the co-main event, the 2019 PFL Welterweight tournament winner Ray Cooper III is scheduled to fight Jason Monet.

The remaining two fights of the main card are scheduled in the light heavyweight division: Jordan Johnson will fight Tom Lawlor, and 2019 PFL Light Heavyweight tournament winner Emiliano Sordi will fight former long time UFC fighter Chris Camozzi.

Jordan Johnson was set to fight Tom Lawlor at this event. However, in March, it was announced that Johnson pulled out and was replaced by Antônio Carlos Júnior. Later, PFL announced that Antônio Carlos Júnior will replace Johnson for the whole season.

On March 25, it was announced that Magomed Magomedkerimov and Alexey Kunchenko pulled out of their bouts due to undisclosed reasons. Due to this, Gleison Tibau and João Zeferino were scheduled to face each other.

At weigh-ins, Vinny Magalhães missed weight and had to be taken to the hospital due to complications of his weight cut, and he was replaced by Askar Mozharov. The next day it was announced that Mozharov pulled out for medical reasons so Jordan Young will receive a walkover win and 3 points.

== Results ==
Main Card (ESPN 2)
| Weight class | | | | Method | Round | Time | Notes |
|---|---|---|---|---|---|---|---|
| Welterweight | Rory MacDonald | def. | Curtis Millender | Submission (rear naked choke) | 1 | 3:38 |
| Welterweight | Ray Cooper III | def. | Jason Ponet | Submission (arm-triangle choke) | 1 | 1:23 |
| Welterweight | João Zeferino | def. | Gleison Tibau | Decision (unanimous) (29-28, 29-28, 29-28) | 3 | 5:00 |
| Light Heavyweight | Emiliano Sordi | def. | Chris Camozzi | Decision (unanimous) (29-28, 29-28, 28-27) | 3 | 5:00 |
Preliminary card (ESPN+)
| Light Heavyweight | Antônio Carlos Júnior | def. | Tom Lawlor | Submission (guillotine choke) | 1 | 4:43 |
| Light Heavyweight | Cezar Ferreira | def. | Nick Roehrick | KO (punches) | 1 | 0:37 |
| Welterweight | Sadibou Sy | vs. | Nikolay Aleksakhin | No Contest (accidental eye poke) | 2 | 1:56 |
| Light Heavyweight | Marthin Hamlet | def. | Dan Spohn | Technical Submission (arm-triangle choke) | 2 | 0:52 |

== Standings After Event ==
The PFL points system is based on results of the match. The winner of a fight receives 3 points. If the fight ends in a draw, both fighters will receive 1 point. The bonus for winning a fight in the first, second, or third round is 3 points, 2 points, and 1 point respectively. The bonus for winning in the third round requires a fight be stopped before 4:59 of the third round. No bonus point will be awarded if a fighter wins via decision. For example, if a fighter wins a fight in the first round, then the fighter will receive 6 total points. A decision win will result in three total points. If a fighter misses weight, the opponent (should they comply with weight limits) will receive 3 points due to a walkover victory, regardless of winning or losing the bout, with the fighter who missed weight being deducted 1 standings point; if the non-offending fighter subsequently wins with a stoppage, all bonus points will be awarded. A fighter who was unable to compete for any reason, will receive a 1-point penalty (-1 point in the standings). The fighters who made weight will not receive a walkover, but will earn points and contracted purse amounts based on their performance in the altered matchup.

=== Light heavyweight ===
| Fighter | Wins | Draws | Losses | 1st | 2nd | 3rd | Total Points (Note: The four fighters with most points advance to the playoffs) |
|---|---|---|---|---|---|---|---|
| Antônio Carlos Júnior | 1 | 0 | 0 | 1 | 0 | 0 | 6 |
| Cezar Ferreira | 1 | 0 | 0 | 1 | 0 | 0 | 6 |
| Marthin Hamlet | 1 | 0 | 0 | 0 | 1 | 0 | 5 |
| Emiliano Sordi | 1 | 0 | 0 | 0 | 0 | 0 | 3 |
| Jordan Young | 1 | 0 | 0 | 0 | 0 | 0 | 3 |
| Chris Camozzi | 0 | 0 | 1 | 0 | 0 | 0 | 0 |
| Tom Lawlor | 0 | 0 | 1 | 0 | 0 | 0 | 0 |
| Nick Roehrick | 0 | 0 | 1 | 0 | 0 | 0 | 0 |
| Dan Spohn | 0 | 0 | 1 | 0 | 0 | 0 | 0 |
| Vinny Magalhães | 0 | 0 | 0 | 0 | 0 | 0 | -1 |

=== Welterweight ===
| Fighter | Wins | Draws | Losses | 1st | 2nd | 3rd | Total Points (Note: The four fighters with most points advance to the playoffs) |
|---|---|---|---|---|---|---|---|
| Ray Cooper III | 1 | 0 | 0 | 1 | 0 | 0 | 6 |
| Rory MacDonald | 1 | 0 | 0 | 1 | 0 | 0 | 6 |
| João Zeferino | 1 | 0 | 0 | 0 | 0 | 0 | 3 |
| Nikolay Aleksakhin | 0 | 0 | 0 | 0 | 0 | 0 | 1 |
| Sadibou Sy | 0 | 0 | 0 | 0 | 0 | 0 | 1 |
| Curtis Millender | 0 | 0 | 1 | 0 | 0 | 0 | 0 |
| ason Ponet | 0 | 0 | 1 | 0 | 0 | 0 | 0 |
| Gleison Tibau | 0 | 0 | 1 | 0 | 0 | 0 | 0 |
| Alexey Kunchenko | 0 | 0 | 0 | 0 | 0 | 0 | -1 |
| Magomed Magomedkerimov | 0 | 0 | 0 | 0 | 0 | 0 | -1 |

== See also ==
- List of PFL events
- List of current PFL fighters
