= Elizeu Zaleski dos Santos =

Brazilian mixed martial arts fighter

- Born: November 12, 1986 (age 40); Francisco Beltrao, Parana, Brazil
- Other names: Capoeira
- Height: 5 ft 11 in (1.80 m)
- Weight: 170 lb (77 kg; 12 st 2 lb)
- Division: Welterweight
- Fighting out of: Curitiba, Parana, Brazil
- Team: CM System
- Rank: Black belt in Brazilian Jiu-Jitsu under Cristiano Marcello
- Years active: 2009–present

Mixed martial arts record
- Total: 37
- Wins: 26
- By knockout: 16
- By submission: 3
- By decision: 7
- Losses: 10
- By knockout: 3
- By submission: 2
- By decision: 5
- Draws: 1

Other information
- Mixed martial arts record from Sherdog

Elizeu Zaleski dos Santos (born November 12, 1986) is a Brazilian mixed martial artist. He competed in the Welterweight division of the Ultimate Fighting Championship (UFC). He was the former Jungle Fight welterweight champion in Brazil

== Background ==
Zaleski was born in Francisco Beltrao, Parana, Brazil. He grew up training in Capoeira since age nine. Zaleski transitioned to MMA at age 20 and started competing professionally soon thereafter.

== Mixed martial arts career ==
=== Early career ===
Zaleski started his MMA career on November 8, 2009, and he fought for many promoters notably Jungle Fight, Smash and Amazon Fight in Brazil. He was the former Jungle Fight welterweight champion and he built a record of 14–4 with 13 finishes and 1 decision prior joining UFC.

=== Ultimate Fighting Championship ===
Zaleski made his promotional debut on May 30, 2015, at UFC Fight Night: Condit vs. Alves against Nicolas Dalby. Zaleski outstruck Dalby as he landed 16 more significant strikes, but judges handed the victory via split decision to Dalby as he successfully took Zaleski down six times.

He faced Omari Akhmedov on his next fight at UFC on Fox: Teixeira vs. Evans on April 16, 2016. He won the fight and claimed his first UFC win via knockout in the third round. The fight earned him his first Fight of the Night bonus award.

On October 1, 2016, Zaleski returned to face Keita Nakamura at UFC Fight Night: Lineker vs. Dodson. After three rounds of fighting, he won the fight with a unanimous decision with the score board of (29–28, 29–28, 29–28).

Zaleski faced Lyman Good, former Bellator and CFFC champion, on July 22, 2017, at UFC on Fox: Weidman vs. Gastelum. He won the back-and-forth fight by split decision. The fight also earned him his second Fight of the Night bonus award.

Zaleski faced Max Griffin on October 28, 2017, at UFC Fight Night: Brunson vs. Machida. He won the fight with a unanimous decision. The win also earned him his third Fight of the Night bonus award.

Zaleski was expected to face Jack Marshman on March 17, 2018, at UFC Fight Night 127. However, on February 19, 2018, Zaleski announced that he is pulling out of the fight because of a knee injury. He was replaced by Brad Scott

Zaleski faced Sean Strickland on May 12, 2018, at UFC 224. He won the fight with a knockout in the first round.

Zaleski was scheduled to meet Belal Muhammad on September 22, 2018, at UFC Fight Night 137. On September 14, 2018, Muhammad was pulled out of the bout and he was replaced by newcomer Luigi Vendramini. He won the fight via knockout in round two.

Zaleski was scheduled to face Li Jingliang on November 25, 2018, at UFC Fight Night 141. However on October 27, 2018, reports were made that Zaleski withdrew from the bout due to a partial ligament tear in his right knee.

Zaleski faced Curtis Millender on March 9, 2019, at UFC Fight Night 146. He won the fight through submission in the first round.

Zaleski was expected to face Neil Magny on May 18, 2019, at UFC Fight Night 151. However, on March 28, 2019, dos Santos announced that he had not been contacted by the UFC about the match.

A pairing with Li Jingliang was rescheduled and took place on August 31, 2019, at UFC Fight Night 157. He lost the fight due to a technical knockout in round three.

As the last fight of his prevailing contract, Zaleski faced Alexey Kunchenko on March 14, 2020, at UFC Fight Night 170. He won the fight with a unanimous decision.

As the first fight of his new, four-fight contract, Zaleski faced Muslim Salikhov on July 11, 2020, at UFC 251. He lost the fight with a split decision.

Zaleski was expected to face promotional newcomer Shavkat Rakhmonov on October 24, 2020 at UFC 254. However, Zaleski pulled out in late September due to a knee injury that required surgery.

Zaleski faced promotional newcomer Benoît Saint-Denis on October 30, 2021, at UFC 267. After nearly finishing Saint-Denis in round two, he won the bout with a unanimous decision.

Zaleski was scheduled to face Mounir Lazzez on April 16, 2022, at UFC on ESPN 34. However, Zaleski dos Santos withdrew the week of the fight for personal reasons and was replaced by Ange Loosa.

On September 22, 2022, it was announced that USADA suspended Zaleski for 1 year after testing positive for ostarine in an out-of-competition test on March 14, 2022. Zaleski and his team contended that the test was due to a contaminated supplement. He is eligible to return on March 14, 2023.

Zaleski faced Abubakar Nurmagomedov June 3, 2023, at UFC on ESPN 46. He won the fight through a split decision.

Zaleski faced Rinat Fakhretdinov on November 4, 2023, at UFC Fight Night 231. The bout ended in a majority draw.

Zaleski faced Randy Brown on June 1, 2024, at UFC 302. He lost the fight by unanimous decision.

Zaleski was scheduled to face Nicolas Dalby in a rematch on November 9, 2024 at UFC Fight Night 247. However, Dalby withdrew from the fight for unknown reasons and was replaced by promotional newcomer Zach Scroggin. At the weigh-ins, Scroggin weighed in at 174 pounds, three pounds over the welterweight non-title fight limit. The bout proceeded at catchweight and Scroggins was fined a percentage of his purse, which went to Zaleski. Zaleski won the fight by technical knockout early in the first round.

Zaleski faced Chidi Njokuani on March 15, 2025, at UFC Fight Night 254. At the weigh-ins, Njokuani weighed in at 172.5 pounds, one and a quarter pounds over the welterweight non-title fight limit. The bout proceeded at catchweight and Njokuani was fined 20 percent of his purse which went to Zaleski dos Santos. Zaleski lost the fight by technical knockout via a knee and elbows in the second round.

Zaleski faced Neil Magny on August 2, 2025 at UFC on ESPN 71. Zaleski lost the fight by technical knockout at the end of the second round.

On December 22, 2025, it was reported that Zaleski had been released by the UFC.

== Championships and accomplishments ==
=== Mixed martial arts ===
- Ultimate Fighting Championship
  - Fight of the Night (Three times) vs. Omari Akhmedov, Lyman Good and Max Griffin
  - UFC.com Awards
    - 2018: Ranked #5 Knockout of the Year vs. Sean Strickland
- Jungle Fight
  - Jungle Fight Welterweight Championship (One time)
    - One successful title defense
- SMASH Fight
  - SMASH Fight Welterweight Tournament

== Personal life ==
His moniker "Capoeira” was coined as his first combat sport was Capoeira.

== Mixed martial arts record ==
Professional record breakdown
37 matches	26 wins	10 losses
By knockout	16	3
By submission	3	2
By decision	7	5
Draws	1	

Res.	Record	Opponent	Method	Event	Date	Round	Time	Location	Notes
Win	26–10–1	Jesse Taylor	TKO (punches)	Liga Monstro Combate 1	June 6, 2026	1	1:24	Curitiba, Brazil	Won the inaugural LMC Welterweight Championship.
Loss	25–10–1	Neil Magny	TKO (punches)	UFC on ESPN: Taira vs. Park	August 2, 2025	2	4:39	Las Vegas, Nevada, United States	
Loss	25–9–1	Chidi Njokuani	TKO (knee and elbows)	UFC Fight Night: Vettori vs. Dolidze 2	March 15, 2025	2	2:19	Las Vegas, Nevada, United States	Catchweight (172.25 lb) bout; Njokuani missed weight.
Win	25–8–1	Zach Scroggin	TKO (punches)	UFC Fight Night: Magny vs. Prates	November 9, 2024	1	1:15	Las Vegas, Nevada, United States	Catchweight (174 lb) bout; Scroggin missed weight.
Loss	24–8–1	Randy Brown	Decision (unanimous)	UFC 302	June 1, 2024	3	5:00	Newark, New Jersey, United States	
Draw	24–7–1	Rinat Fakhretdinov	Draw (majority)	UFC Fight Night: Almeida vs. Lewis	November 4, 2023	3	5:00	São Paulo, Brazil	
Win	24–7	Abubakar Nurmagomedov	Decision (split)	UFC on ESPN: Kara-France vs. Albazi	June 3, 2023	3	5:00	Las Vegas, Nevada, United States	
Win	23–7	Benoît Saint Denis	Decision (unanimous)	UFC 267	October 30, 2021	3	5:00	Abu Dhabi, United Arab Emirates	Zaleski dos Santos was deducted 1 point in round 3 due to a groin strike.
Loss	22–7	Muslim Salikhov	Decision (split)	UFC 251	July 12, 2020	3	5:00	Abu Dhabi, United Arab Emirates	
Win	22–6	Alexey Kunchenko	Decision (unanimous)	UFC Fight Night: Lee vs. Oliveira	March 14, 2020	3	5:00	Brasília, Brazil	
Loss	21–6	Li Jingliang	TKO (punches)	UFC Fight Night: Andrade vs. Zhang	August 31, 2019	3	4:51	Shenzhen, China	
Win	21–5	Curtis Millender	Submission (rear-naked choke)	UFC Fight Night: Lewis vs. dos Santos	March 9, 2019	1	2:35	Wichita, Kansas, United States	
Win	20–5	Luigi Vendramini	KO (flying knee and punches)	UFC Fight Night: Santos vs. Anders	September 22, 2018	2	1:20	São Paulo, Brazil	
Win	19–5	Sean Strickland	KO (spinning wheel kick and punches)	UFC 224	May 12, 2018	1	3:40	Rio de Janeiro, Brazil	
Win	18–5	Max Griffin	Decision (unanimous)	UFC Fight Night: Brunson vs. Machida	October 28, 2017	3	5:00	São Paulo, Brazil	Fight of the Night.
Win	17–5	Lyman Good	Decision (split)	UFC on Fox: Weidman vs. Gastelum	July 22, 2017	3	5:00	Uniondale, New York, United States	Fight of the Night.
Win	16–5	Keita Nakamura	Decision (unanimous)	UFC Fight Night: Lineker vs. Dodson	October 1, 2016	3	5:00	Portland, Oregon, United States	
Win	15–5	Omari Akhmedov	TKO (knees and punches)	UFC on Fox: Teixeira vs. Evans	April 16, 2016	3	3:03	Tampa, Florida, United States	Fight of the Night.
Loss	14–5	Nicolas Dalby	Decision (split)	UFC Fight Night: Condit vs. Alves	May 30, 2015	3	5:00	Goiânia, Brazil	
Win	14–4	Eduardo Ramon	Submission (rear-naked choke)	Jungle Fight 75	December 18, 2014	2	2:07	Belém, Brazil	Defended the Jungle Fight Welterweight Championship.
Win	13–4	Itamar Rosa	KO (punches)	Jungle Fight 71	July 19, 2014	1	1:59	São Paulo, Brazil	Won the vacant Jungle Fight Welterweight Championship.
Win	12–4	Rodrigo Souza	KO (punches)	Jungle Fight 65	February 2, 2014	2	2:57	Bahia, Brazil	
Win	11–4	Josenildo Ramalho	KO (punches)	Jungle Fight 59	October 12, 2013	1	2:42	Rio de Janeiro, Brazil	
Loss	10–4	Guilherme Vasconcelos	Submission (rear-naked choke)	Jungle Fight 54	June 29, 2013	2	2:20	Rio de Janeiro, Brazil	
Win	10–3	Ricardo Silva	KO (punches)	SMASH Fight 1	May 3, 2013	1	1:16	Curitiba, Brazil	Won the SMASH Fight Welterweight Tournament.
Win	9–3	Gilmar Dutra Lima	KO (punch)	SMASH Fight 1	May 3, 2013	1	0:27	Curitiba, Brazil	SMASH Fight Welterweight Tournament Semifinal.
Loss	8–3	Franklin Jensen	Decision (unanimous)	Sparta MMA 1	September 29, 2012	3	5:00	Itajai, Brazil	
Win	8–2	Misael Chamorro	Submission (rear-naked choke)	Beltrão Combat 1	May 19, 2012	2	1:35	Francisco Beltrão, Brazil	
Loss	7–2	Viscardi Andrade	Submission (rear-naked choke)	Max Fight 11	March 17, 2012	2	1:27	Campinas, Brazil	
Loss	7–1	José de Ribamar	Decision (split)	Amazon Fight 10	December 7, 2011	3	5:00	Belém, Brazil	
Win	7–0	Jackson Pontes	TKO (punches)	Max Fight 10	November 10, 2011	1	2:42	São Paulo, Brazil	
Win	6–0	João Paulo Prado	TKO (retirement)	Vale FC 1	August 6, 2011	2	5:00	Taubaté, Brazil	
Win	5–0	Misael Chamorro	TKO (punches)	Big Bold's Night 1	November 13, 2010	1	N/A	Cascavel, Brazil	
Win	4–0	Dyego Roberto	TKO (body kick)	Samurai Fight Combat 3	April 25, 2010	3	4:16	Curitiba, Brazil	
Win	3–0	Christian Tide Squeti	Decision (split)	Londrina Fight Show 1	December 13, 2009	3	5:00	Londrina, Brazil	
Win	2–0	Wellington Morgenstern	KO (punches)	B33 Fight 8	November 15, 2009	1	N/A	Ponta Grossa, Brazil	
Win	1–0	Douglas Jandozo	KO (punches)	G1 Open Fight 7	November 8, 2009	1	3:03	Joaquim Tavora, Brazil	Welterweight debut.

== See also ==
- List of male mixed martial artists
