= UFC 117 =

UFC mixed martial arts event in 2010

UFC 117: Silva vs. Sonnen
- The poster for UFC 117: Silva vs. Sonnen
- Promotion: Ultimate Fighting Championship
- Date: August 7, 2010
- Venue: Oracle Arena
- City: Oakland, California
- Attendance: 12,971
- Total gate: $1,560,000
- Buyrate: 600,000

Event chronology
UFC Live: Jones vs. Matyushenko	UFC 117: Silva vs. Sonnen	UFC 118: Edgar vs. Penn 2

UFC 117: Silva vs. Sonnen was a mixed martial arts event held by the Ultimate Fighting Championship on August 7, 2010, at the Oracle Arena in Oakland, California, United States.

== Background ==
UFC President Dana White announced via ESPN on Jim Rome is Burning that Middleweight Champion Anderson Silva would face Chael Sonnen on August 7.

White threatened to cut Silva from the UFC if he fought the same way he did in his previous bout in Abu Dhabi at UFC 112. "I'm telling you right now, if he acts like that again in the ring, I will cut him," said White. "I don't care if he's the pound for pound best fighter in the world. I don't care if he's the middleweight champion."

A bout between Joey Beltran and Matt Mitrione was reported to be in the works. The fight was later moved to UFC 119.

Stanislav Nedkov was scheduled to make his UFC debut against Rodney Wallace, but was replaced by Phil Davis after sustaining an injury.

Thiago Silva was scheduled to face Tim Boetsch, but was forced off the card with an aggravated back injury. Silva's replacement was Todd Brown.

Dana White confirmed that the winner of the Fitch vs. Alves fight would receive a title shot.

The Fitch/Alves fight was changed to catchweight status after Alves weighed in at 171.5 lb; 0.5 lb over the 171 lb welterweight limit for non title fights. Alves was fined 20% of his purse.

== Results ==
Main card
Weight class				Method	Round	Time	Notes
Middleweight	Anderson Silva (c)	def	Chael Sonnen	Submission (triangle armbar)	5	3:10	(Note: For the UFC Middleweight Championship.)
Catchweight (171.5 lb)	Jon Fitch	def	Thiago Alves	Decision (unanimous) (30–27, 30–27, 30–27)	3	5:00
Lightweight	Clay Guida	def	Rafael dos Anjos	TKO (jaw injury)	3	1:51
Welterweight	Matt Hughes	def	Ricardo Almeida	Technical Submission (Anaconda choke)	1	3:15
Heavyweight	Junior dos Santos	def	Roy Nelson	Decision (unanimous) (30–26, 30–27, 30–27)	3	5:00
Preliminary card
Weight class				Method	Round	Time	Notes
Welterweight	Rick Story	def	Dustin Hazelett	TKO (punches)	2	1:15
Light Heavyweight	Phil Davis	def	Rodney Wallace	Decision (unanimous) (30–26, 30–27, 30–27)	3	5:00
Welterweight	Johny Hendricks	def	Charlie Brenneman	TKO (punches)	2	0:40
Light Heavyweight	Tim Boetsch	def	Todd Brown	Decision (unanimous) (29–28, 29–28, 29–28)	3	5:00
Heavyweight	Stefan Struve	def	Christian Morecraft	KO (punches)	2	0:22
Welterweight	Dennis Hallman	def	Ben Saunders	Decision (unanimous) (29–28, 30–27, 29–28)	3	5:00

== Bonus awards ==
The following fighters received $60,000 bonuses.

- Fight of the Night: Anderson Silva vs. Chael Sonnen
- Knockout of the Night: Stefan Struve
- Submission of the Night: Anderson Silva and Matt Hughes

== Reported payout ==
The following is the reported payout to the fighters as reported to the California State Athletic Commission. It does not include sponsor money or "locker room" bonuses often given by the UFC and also do not include the UFC's traditional "fight night" bonuses.

- Anderson Silva $200,000 (no win bonus) def. Chael Sonnen $35,000
- Jon Fitch $108,000 ($54,000 win bonus) def. Thiago Alves $60,000
- Clay Guida $56,000 ($28,000 win bonus) def. Rafael dos Anjos $12,000
- Matt Hughes $200,000 ($100,000 win bonus) def. Ricardo Almeida $35,000
- Junior dos Santos $80,000 ($40,000 win bonus) def. Roy Nelson $15,000
- Rick Story $22,000 ($11,000 win bonus) def. Dustin Hazlett $18,000
- Phil Davis $18,000 ($9,000 win bonus) def. Rodney Wallace $6,000
- Johny Hendricks $40,000 ($20,000 win bonus) def. Charlie Brenneman $8,000
- Tim Boetsch $32,000 ($16,000 win bonus) def. Todd Brown $6,000
- Stefan Struve $30,000 ($15,000 win bonus) def. Christian Morecraft $8,000
- Dennis Hallman $30,000 ($15,000 win bonus) def. Ben Saunders $12,000

^ Thiago Alves was reportedly fined 20 percent of his purse for failing to make the 170-pound welterweight limit. The CSAC's initial report did not include information on the penalty.

== See also ==
- Ultimate Fighting Championship
- List of UFC champions
- List of UFC events
- 2010 in UFC
