= UFC 115 =

Mixed martial arts event in 2010

UFC 115: Liddell vs. Franklin
- The poster for UFC 115: Liddell vs. Franklin
- Promotion: Ultimate Fighting Championship
- Date: June 12, 2010
- Venue: General Motors Place
- City: Vancouver, British Columbia, Canada
- Attendance: 17,669
- Total gate: $4,221,787
- Buyrate: 520,000

Event chronology
UFC 114: Rampage vs. Evans	UFC 115: Liddell vs. Franklin	The Ultimate Fighter: Team Liddell vs. Team Ortiz Finale

UFC 115: Liddell vs. Franklin was a mixed martial arts event held by the Ultimate Fighting Championship on June 12, 2010, at General Motors Place (now Rogers Arena) in Vancouver, British Columbia, Canada.

== Background ==
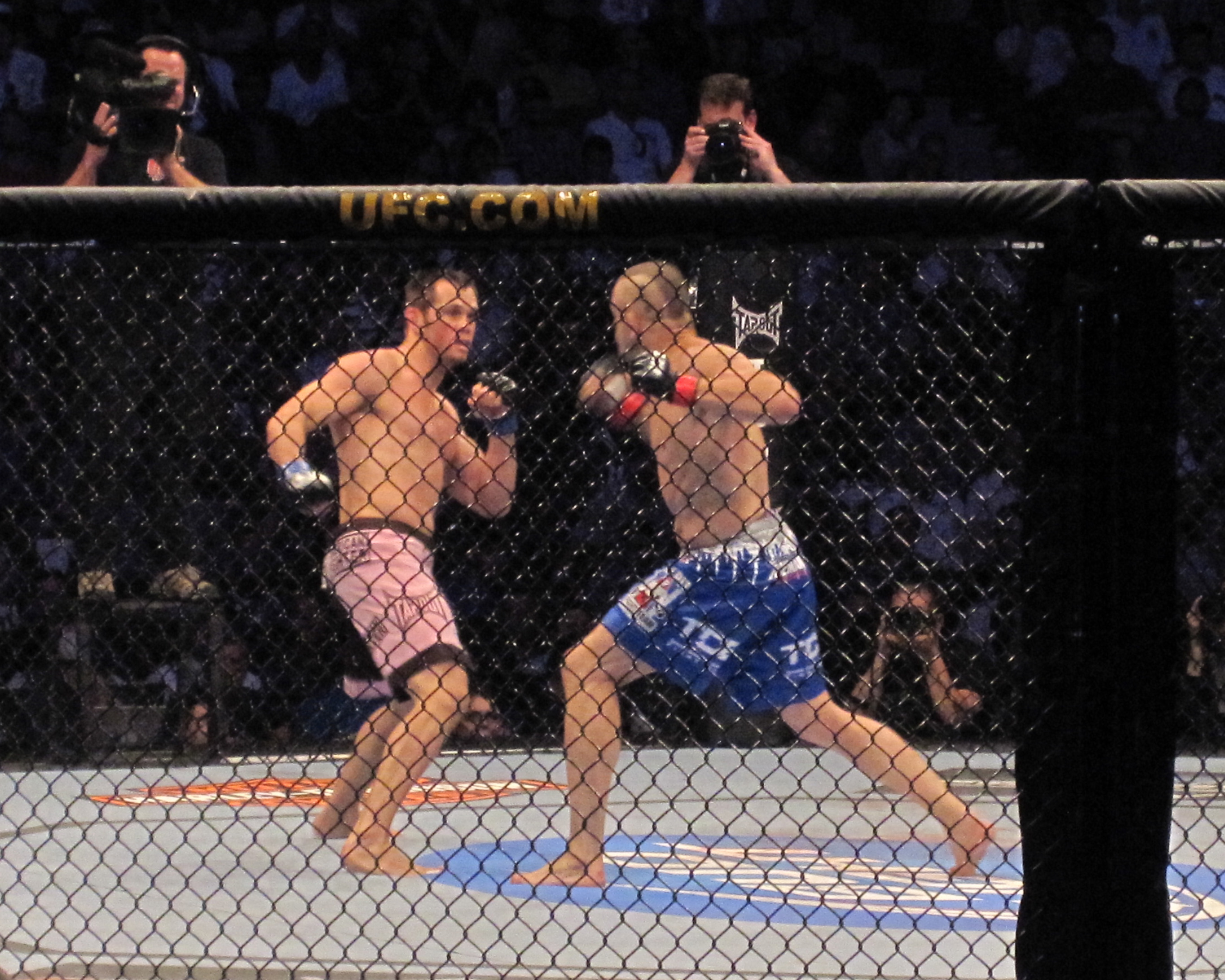
Rich Franklin against Chuck Liddell in the main event of UFC 115

This was the fourth UFC event to be held in Canada, following UFC 83, UFC 97 and UFC 113 and the first UFC event held in British Columbia since they passed a bill to sanction MMA, on December 17, 2009. For a few days, this event location was in jeopardy because there were still no regulations in place to promote the sport professionally within Vancouver and Cincinnati was rumoured to be a possible location for moving this event. However, the problems were resolved and Dana White confirmed that the show will be going ahead in Vancouver on the scheduled date.

The main event was tentatively set to be a third bout featuring Ultimate Fighter coaches and former Light Heavyweight Champions Chuck Liddell and Tito Ortiz. In March, rumours began to circulate that Rich Franklin would replace Ortiz as Liddell's opponent, after Ortiz had supposedly withdrawn from the fight. However, Dana White denied this via his Twitter account on March 13, 2010, noting that Liddell vs. Ortiz was still set to be at the main event. Then, after the announcement, Ortiz had to withdraw from the match due to neck surgery.

Despite confirming Liddell/Ortiz III would in fact be at the main event for the card, the main event was confirmed on April 12 as Liddell vs. Franklin due to a neck injury suffered by Ortiz.

The on-again, off-again rematch between Thiago Alves and Jon Fitch, first scheduled for UFC 107 then UFC 111 and then UFC 115 was moved again, to UFC 117.

The Ben Rothwell vs. Gilbert Yvel fight replaced Tyson Griffin vs. Evan Dunham on the main card. Griffin vs. Dunham was shown on the preliminaries aired on Spike TV.

Just like UFC 111 in March, UFC 115 was shown in movie theaters around the United States by NCM Fathom.

== Results ==
Main Card
Weight class				Method	Round	Time	Notes
Light Heavyweight	Rich Franklin	def.	Chuck Liddell	KO (punch)	1	4:55
Heavyweight	Mirko Cro Cop	def.	Pat Barry	Submission (rear-naked choke)	3	4:30
Welterweight	Martin Kampmann	def.	Paulo Thiago	Decision (unanimous) (30–27, 30–27, 30–27)	3	5:00
Heavyweight	Ben Rothwell	def.	Gilbert Yvel	Decision (unanimous) (30–27, 29–28, 29–28)	3	5:00
Welterweight	Carlos Condit	def.	Rory MacDonald	TKO (punches)	3	4:53
Preliminary card (Spike TV)
Lightweight	Evan Dunham	def.	Tyson Griffin	Decision (split) (30–27, 28–29, 29–28)	3	5:00
Lightweight	Matt Wiman	def.	Mac Danzig	Technical Submission (guillotine choke)	1	1:45	(Note: Referee Yves Lavigne controversially stopped the fight as Danzig did not appear to tap and was not left unconscious by the choke.)
Preliminary card
Middleweight	Mario Miranda	def.	David Loiseau	TKO (punches)	2	4:07
Welterweight	James Wilks	def.	Peter Sobotta	Decision (unanimous) (30–27, 30–28, 30–27)	3	5:00
Welterweight	Claude Patrick	def.	Ricardo Funch	Submission (guillotine choke)	2	1:48
Welterweight	Mike Pyle	def.	Jesse Lennox	Submission (triangle choke)	3	4:44

== Bonus awards ==
The following fighters received $85,000 bonuses.

- Fight of the Night: Carlos Condit vs. Rory MacDonald
- Knockout of the Night: Rich Franklin
- Submission of the Night: Mirko Cro Cop

== Reported payout ==
The following is the reported payout to the fighters as reported to the Vancouver Athletic Commission. It does not include sponsor money or "locker room" bonuses often given by the UFC and also do not include the UFC's traditional "fight night" bonuses.

- Rich Franklin $140,000 ($70,000 win bonus) def. Chuck Liddell ($500,000)
- Mirko Cro Cop $150,000 ($75,000 win bonus) def. Pat Barry ($11,000)
- Martin Kampman $50,000 ($25,000 win bonus) def. Paulo Thiago ($18,000)
- Ben Rothwell $100,000 ($50,000 win bonus) def. Gilbert Yvel ($30,000)
- Carlos Condit $52,000 ($26,000 win bonus) def. Rory MacDonald ($8,000)
- Evan Dunham $26,000 ($13,000 win bonus) def. Tyson Griffin ($28,000)
- Matt Wiman $28,000 ($14,000 win bonus) def. Mac Danzig ($24,000)
- Mario Miranda $12,000 ($6,000 win bonus) def. David Loiseau ($12,000)
- James Wilks $30,000 ($15,000 win bonus) def. Peter Sobotta ($4,000)
- Claude Patrick $12,000 ($6,000 win bonus) def. Ricardo Funch ($5,000)
- Mike Pyle $38,000 ($19,000 win bonus) def. Jesse Lennox ($7,000)

== See also ==
- Ultimate Fighting Championship
- List of UFC champions
- List of UFC events
- 2010 in UFC
