= Ricardo Funch =

Brazilian mixed martial arts fighter

- Born: August 14, 1980 (age 46); Lencois, Bahia, Brazil
- Other names: Golden Boy
- Height: 5 ft 10 in (1.78 m)
- Weight: 170 lb (77 kg; 12 st)
- Division: Welterweight
- Fighting out of: Ludlow, Massachusetts, United States
- Team: Team Link
- Rank: Black Belt in Brazilian Jiu-Jitsu
- Years active: 2006–present

Mixed martial arts record
- Total: 15
- Wins: 9
- By knockout: 5
- By submission: 1
- By decision: 3
- Losses: 6
- By knockout: 1
- By submission: 4
- By decision: 1

Other information
- Mixed martial arts record from Sherdog

Ricardo Funch (born August 14, 1980) is a Brazilian professional mixed martial artist currently competing in the Welterweight division. A professional competitor since 2006, Funch has formerly competed for the UFC.

== Mixed martial arts career ==
=== Ultimate Fighting Championship ===
Funch signed a four-fight deal with UFC and made his UFC debut against fellow undefeated fighter Johny Hendricks on December 12, 2009, at UFC 107. He lost the fight via unanimous decision.

Funch was next scheduled to fight at UFC 111 against Matthew Riddle, but was forced to pull out of the fight.

Funch then faced UFC newcomer Claude Patrick on June 12, 2010, at UFC 115. In the second round Funch was submitted by a guillotine choke. After going 0–2 in the promotion, Funch was released from the UFC.

=== Post UFC ===
Following his first UFC release, Funch took some time off, but would return to action on December 3, 2011, at Premier FC 7 picking up a decision win over Bellator vet Ryan Quinn.

=== Return to UFC ===
Funch returned to the UFC to replace an injured Paulo Thiago against Mike Pyle on January 14, 2012, at UFC 142. He was defeated by Pyle via first-round TKO after being stunned by a straight right, dropped by a knee and finished with punches.

Funch fought Dan Miller on June 22, 2012, at UFC on FX 4. He lost the bout in the third round via submission due to a guillotine choke.

After dropping to 0–4 within the promotion, Funch was released from the UFC once again.

=== Post-UFC ===
Following his second UFC release, Funch took some time off, but would return to action on October 10, 2014, at CES MMA 26 and suffered a submission loss to Ultimate Fighting Championship vet Chuck O'Neil in a bout for the CES MMA Welterweight Championship.

== Mixed martial arts record ==
Professional record breakdown
15 matches	9 wins	6 losses
By knockout	5	1
By submission	1	4
By decision	3	1

Res.	Record	Opponent	Method	Event	Date	Round	Time	Location	Notes
Loss	9–6	Matt Secor	Submission (kneebar)	Premier FC 20	July 30, 2016	2	3:35	Springfield, Massachusetts, United States	
Win	9–5	Brett Oteri	KO (punches)	Premier FC 18	November 14, 2015	1	0:21	Springfield, Massachusetts, United States	
Loss	8–5	Chuck O'Neil	Submission (armbar)	CES MMA 26	October 10, 2014	2	2:51	Lincoln, Rhode Island, United States	For the CES MMA Welterweight Championship.
Loss	8–4	Dan Miller	Submission (guillotine choke)	UFC on FX: Maynard vs. Guida	June 22, 2012	3	3:12	Atlantic City, New Jersey, United States	
Loss	8–3	Mike Pyle	TKO (knee and punches)	UFC 142	January 14, 2012	1	1:22	Rio de Janeiro, Brazil	
Win	8–2	Ryan Quinn	Decision (unanimous)	Premier FC 7	December 3, 2011	3	5:00	Amherst, Massachusetts, United States	
Loss	7–2	Claude Patrick	Submission (guillotine choke)	UFC 115	June 12, 2010	2	1:48	Vancouver, British Columbia, Canada	
Loss	7–1	Johny Hendricks	Decision (unanimous)	UFC 107	December 12, 2009	3	5:00	Memphis, Tennessee, United States	
Win	7–0	Denis Grachev	Decision (unanimous)	Cage Fight: MMA2	August 23, 2008	3	5:00	Manchester, New Hampshire, United States	
Win	6–0	TJ Waldburger	TKO (punches)	XFC: Xtreme Fighting Championships	June 14, 2008	2	2:35	Austin, Texas, United States	
Win	5–0	Woody Weatherby	KO (punches)	WFL 20: Calloway Cup 8	December 1, 2007	1	N/A	Revere, Massachusetts, United States	Won WFL Welterweight Championship.
Win	4–0	Chandler Holderness	Decision (unanimous)	WFL 17: Unleashed 2	June 9, 2007	3	5:00	Revere, Massachusetts, United States	
Win	3–0	Justin Gould	TKO (punches)	WFL 16: Moment of Truth 2	March 31, 2007	1	N/A	Revere, Massachusetts, United States	
Win	2–0	Calvin Bates	Submission (rear-naked choke)	WFL 13: Calloway Cup 4	November 27, 2006	1	N/A	Revere, Massachusetts, United States	
Win	1–0	Johnathan Sola	TKO (punches)	RF: Invasion	September 23, 2006	1	N/A	Manchester, New Hampshire, United States	

== See also ==
- List of male mixed martial artists
- List of Brazilian jiu-jitsu practitioners
