= UFC 123 =

UFC mixed martial arts event in 2010

UFC 123: Rampage vs. Machida
- The poster for UFC 123: Rampage vs. Machida
- Promotion: Ultimate Fighting Championship
- Date: November 20, 2010
- Venue: The Palace of Auburn Hills
- City: Auburn Hills, Michigan
- Attendance: 16,404
- Total gate: $2,100,000
- Buyrate: 500,000

Event chronology
| UFC 122: Marquardt vs. Okami | UFC 123: Rampage vs. Machida | The Ultimate Fighter: Team GSP vs. Team Koscheck Finale |

UFC 123: Rampage vs. Machida was a mixed martial arts event held by the Ultimate Fighting Championship on November 20, 2010, at the Palace of Auburn Hills in Auburn Hills, Michigan. It was the first UFC event in the Metro Detroit area since UFC 9.

== Background ==
A private ceremony was hosted an hour before the start of the card, where José Aldo was awarded the inaugural UFC Featherweight Championship belt by Dana White. Fans in the building were not permitted to view the ceremony.

UFC 123 featured preliminary fights live on Spike TV.

On October 13, Rory MacDonald had to withdraw from his fight against Matt Brown. He was replaced by Brian Foster.

Gabe Ruediger was scheduled to face Paul Kelly, but was forced off the card with a groin injury on October 25. T.J. O'Brien replaced Ruediger.

Darren Elkins withdrew from his matchup with promotional newcomer Edson Barboza and was replaced by Mike Lullo.

== Results ==
Main Card
| Weight class | | | | Method | Round | Time | Notes |
|---|---|---|---|---|---|---|---|
| Light Heavyweight | Quinton Jackson | def. | Lyoto Machida | Decision (split) (28–29, 29–28, 29–28) | 3 | 5:00 |
| Welterweight | B.J. Penn | def. | Matt Hughes | KO (punches) | 1 | 0:21 |
| Middleweight | Maiquel Falcão | def. | Gerald Harris | Decision (unanimous) (29–27, 29–28, 29–28) | 3 | 5:00 |
| Light Heavyweight | Phil Davis | def. | Tim Boetsch | Submission (modified kimura) | 2 | 2:55 |
| Lightweight | George Sotiropoulos | def. | Joe Lauzon | Submission (kimura) | 2 | 2:43 |
Preliminary card (Spike TV)
| Welterweight | Brian Foster | def. | Matt Brown | Submission (guillotine choke) | 2 | 2:11 |
| Middleweight | Mark Muñoz | def. | Aaron Simpson | Decision (unanimous) (29–28, 29–28, 29–28) | 3 | 5:00 |
Preliminary card
| Welterweight | Dennis Hallman | def. | Karo Parisyan | TKO (punches) | 1 | 1:47 |
| Lightweight | Edson Barboza | def. | Mike Lullo | TKO (leg kicks) | 3 | 0:26 |
| Lightweight | Paul Kelly | def. | T.J. O'Brien | TKO (elbows) | 2 | 3:16 |
| Lightweight | Nik Lentz | def. | Tyson Griffin | Decision (split) (29–28, 27–30, 29–28) | 3 | 5:00 |

== Bonus awards ==
The following fighters received $80,000 bonuses.

- Fight of the Night: George Sotiropoulos vs. Joe Lauzon
- Knockout of the Night: B.J. Penn
- Submission of the Night: Phil Davis

== Controversy ==
A formal complaint was filed with Michigan's Unarmed Combat Commission regarding the timekeeping of the Harris-Falcão match. Near the end of the first round, Falcão was choking Harris. The allegation is that the timekeeper ended the round six seconds early and in turn had the round not ended early, Falcão may have successfully choked out Harris. Despite Falcão ultimately winning the fight by decision, the formal complaint was filed on January 13, 2011.

== See also ==
- Ultimate Fighting Championship
- List of UFC champions
- List of UFC events
- 2010 in UFC
