= Evan Dunham =

American mixed martial arts fighter

- Born: December 18, 1981 (age 44); Eugene, Oregon, U.S.
- Height: 5 ft 10 in (178 cm)
- Weight: 155 lb (70 kg; 11 st 1 lb)
- Division: Lightweight
- Reach: 70 in (178 cm)
- Style: Wrestling, Boxing
- Stance: Southpaw
- Fighting out of: Las Vegas, Nevada, United States
- Team: Xtreme Couture; Dunham Jiu Jitsu
- Rank: 1st degree black belt in Brazilian Jiu-Jitsu under Megaton Dias and Robert Drysdale
- Years active: 2007–2020

Mixed martial arts record
- Total: 28
- Wins: 18
- By knockout: 3
- By submission: 6
- By decision: 9
- Losses: 9
- By knockout: 4
- By submission: 2
- By decision: 3
- Draws: 1

Other information
- University: University of Oregon
- Mixed martial arts record from Sherdog

Evan Dunham (born December 18, 1981) is an American professional mixed martial artist competing in the lightweight division. He is perhaps best known for 21-fight tenure in the Ultimate Fighting Championship which spanned over a decade.

== Background ==
Dunham, born and raised in Eugene, Oregon, began wrestling in middle school and continued at Winston Churchill High School. Dunham later attended the University of Oregon, and in 2000 he began training in Brazilian jiu-jitsu. He graduated with a degree in sociology, and worked in various jobs before becoming a fighter full-time.

== Mixed martial arts career ==
=== Early career ===
In an amateur bout in 2006 (a year before his professional debut), Dunham fought fellow future UFC lightweight title challenger Gray Maynard. Dunham lost the fight via unanimous decision.

Dunham made his professional debut in 2007; he had five fights total that year. After winning six straight, Dunham was invited to fight for Palace Fighting Championship, a mid-size organization. He won his fight over Team Alpha Male's Dustin Akbari via rear-naked choke submission and remained undefeated.

=== Ultimate Fighting Championship ===
Dunham made his UFC debut on February 21, 2009, against Per Eklund at UFC 95. He showed an aggressive style, knocking the more experienced Eklund out with a straight left at 2:14 of round one.

Dunham had his second fight in the UFC when he defeated returning veteran Marcus Aurélio via split decision at UFC 102. He showed quick and accurate striking skills and displayed some excellent submission defense against the seasoned grappler.

Dunham's third fight was against The Ultimate Fighter 8 winner, Efraín Escudero on January 11, 2010, at UFC Fight Night 20 where the fight was the co-main event. Dunham rallied from a rough first round, taking the second and finally finishing with an armbar in the third round, nearly breaking Escudero's arm. The submission earned him an extra $30,000 for winning Submission of the Night honors.

Dunham faced Xtreme Couture standout and ex-training partner Tyson Griffin, on June 12, 2010, at UFC 115. Dunham was dominant in all three rounds, taking Griffin's back on numerous occasions and effectively countering strikes. He won the fight via split decision.

Dunham faced former UFC Lightweight Champion Sean Sherk on September 25, 2010, at UFC 119. He received the first loss of his MMA career via controversial split decision. Sherk utilized his wrestling during round 1, opening up a large cut above Dunham's right eye and boxing well in the early part of round 2, while Dunham utilized submissions and effective striking throughout the latter parts of rounds 2 and 3. UFC president Dana White later said that he felt Dunham was 'robbed'. The bout was awarded Fight of the Night honors.

Dunham was expected to face Kenny Florian at UFC 126, but the bout instead was moved to headline UFC Fight Night 23 on January 22, 2011. Dunham confirmed the fight on his personal Facebook page. However, on December 6, Florian pulled out of the bout due to injury. Instead, Melvin Guillard, who had been set to fight Yves Edwards on the preliminary card, took on Dunham in the main event. Dunham lost via TKO in the first round after getting continuously hit by combinations from the much faster Guillard.

Dunham was expected to face George Sotiropoulos on July 2, 2011, at UFC 132. However, he was forced out of the bout due to an injury and replaced by Rafael dos Anjos.

Dunham faced Shamar Bailey on September 17, 2011, at UFC Fight Night 25. He won the fight via unanimous decision.

Dunham was expected to face Paul Sass on January 28, 2012, at UFC on Fox 2. However, Sass was dropped from the bout because of an injury and replaced by Nik Lentz. Dunham defeated Lentz via TKO (doctor stoppage) at the conclusion of the second round. The back and forth action earned both fighters $65,000 Fight of the Night honors for their performance.

Dunham was expected to face Edson Barboza on May 26, 2012, at UFC 146, but was forced from the event with another injury and replaced by returning veteran Jamie Varner.

Dunham lost to T. J. Grant via unanimous decision on September 22, 2012, at UFC 152. Both fighters were awarded $65,000 Fight of the Night honors.

Dunham faced Gleison Tibau on February 2, 2013, at UFC 156. He won the fight via split decision.

Dunham next fought Rafael dos Anjos on May 18, 2013, at UFC on FX 8. Dunham lost the back-and-forth fight via unanimous decision.

Dunham next opponent was Donald Cerrone at UFC 167. Dunham lost the fight via submission in the second round.

Dunham was expected to face Mark Bocek on April 16, 2014, at The Ultimate Fighter Nations Finale. However, Dunham pulled out of the bout in the week leading up to the event with an undisclosed injury.

Dunham fought Edson Barboza on July 16, 2014, at UFC Fight Night 45. Dunham lost the fight via TKO in the first round.

Dunham faced Rodrigo Damm on January 3, 2015, at UFC 182. He won the fight by unanimous decision.

Dunham defeated Ross Pearson on July 18, 2015, at UFC Fight Night 72. He won the fight by unanimous decision.

Dunham faced Joe Lauzon on December 11, 2015, at The Ultimate Fighter 22 Finale. He won the fight by unanimous decision.

Dunham was expected to face Leonardo Santos on June 4, 2016, at UFC 199. However, Santos pulled out on April 29 due to an undisclosed injury and was replaced by James Vick. In turn, Dunham pulled out of that pairing on May 5 for undisclosed reasons and was replaced by Beneil Dariush.

Dunham was scheduled to face Abel Trujillo on September 17, 2016, at UFC Fight Night 94. However, Trujillo pulled out of the fight on September 5, citing an undisclosed injury and was replaced by former WSOF Featherweight Champion and promotional newcomer Ricky Glenn. He won the fight via unanimous decision. Both participants were awarded a $50,000 Fight of the Night award for their performance.

The bout with Trujillo was rescheduled and was expected to take place on February 4, 2017, at UFC Fight Night 104. However, on January 19, Dunham pulled out of the fight with an injury and was replaced by James Vick.

Dunham fought Beneil Dariush on October 7, 2017, at UFC 216. The fight ended in a majority draw.

Dunham was expected to face Mairbek Taisumov on April 7, 2018, at UFC 223. However, Taisumov was removed from the fight on March 9 for alleged visa issues, restricting his travel. Dunham instead faced Olivier Aubin-Mercier at the event. He lost the fight by TKO in the first round.

Dunham faced Francisco Trinaldo on September 22, 2018, at UFC Fight Night 137. He lost the fight via knockout in the second round due to a knee to the body. He announced his retirement after the fight.

Dunham returned from retirement and was scheduled to face Michael Johnson on April 25, 2020. However, on April 9, Dana White, the president of UFC announced that the event was postponed to a future date and the matchup was later scrapped.

Dunham faced Herbert Burns on June 6, 2020, at UFC 250 in a 150 lb catchweight bout. He lost the bout via first round submission and was subsequently released from the promotion.

== Personal life ==
He currently owns and operates Resolution Jiu Jitsu in Oregon and works as a police officer.

Resolution closed down November 2024

== Championships and accomplishments ==
- Ultimate Fighting Championship
  - Fight of the Night (Four times) vs. Sean Sherk, Nik Lentz, T. J. Grant and Ricky Glenn
  - Submission of the Night (One time) vs. Efraín Escudero
  - UFC.com Awards
    - 2010: Ranked #10 Fighter of the Year (Tied with Rick Story & Chris Leben) & Ranked #5 Fight of the Year vs. Sean Sherk

== Mixed martial arts record ==
Professional record breakdown
28 matches	18 wins	9 losses
By knockout	3	4
By submission	6	2
By decision	9	3
Draws	1	

Res.	Record	Opponent	Method	Event	Date	Round	Time	Location	Notes
Loss	18–9–1	Herbert Burns	Submission (rear-naked choke)	UFC 250	June 6, 2020	1	1:20	Las Vegas, Nevada, United States	Catchweight (150 lbs) bout.
Loss	18–8–1	Francisco Trinaldo	KO (knee to the body)	UFC Fight Night: Santos vs. Anders	September 22, 2018	2	4:10	São Paulo, Brazil	
Loss	18–7–1	Olivier Aubin-Mercier	TKO (knee and punches)	UFC 223	April 7, 2018	1	0:53	Brooklyn, New York, United States	
Draw	18–6–1	Beneil Dariush	Draw (majority)	UFC 216	October 7, 2017	3	5:00	Las Vegas, Nevada, United States	
Win	18–6	Ricky Glenn	Decision (unanimous)	UFC Fight Night: Poirier vs. Johnson	September 17, 2016	3	5:00	Hidalgo, Texas, United States	Fight of the Night.
Win	17–6	Joe Lauzon	Decision (unanimous)	The Ultimate Fighter: Team McGregor vs. Team Faber Finale	December 11, 2015	3	5:00	Las Vegas, Nevada, United States	
Win	16–6	Ross Pearson	Decision (unanimous)	UFC Fight Night: Bisping vs. Leites	July 18, 2015	3	5:00	Glasgow, Scotland	
Win	15–6	Rodrigo Damm	Decision (unanimous)	UFC 182	January 3, 2015	3	5:00	Las Vegas, Nevada, United States	
Loss	14–6	Edson Barboza	TKO (kick to the body and punches)	UFC Fight Night: Cowboy vs. Miller	July 16, 2014	1	3:06	Atlantic City, New Jersey, United States	
Loss	14–5	Donald Cerrone	Submission (triangle choke)	UFC 167	November 16, 2013	2	3:49	Las Vegas, Nevada, United States	
Loss	14–4	Rafael dos Anjos	Decision (unanimous)	UFC on FX: Belfort vs. Rockhold	May 18, 2013	3	5:00	Jaraguá do Sul, Brazil	
Win	14–3	Gleison Tibau	Decision (split)	UFC 156	February 2, 2013	3	5:00	Las Vegas, Nevada, United States	
Loss	13–3	T. J. Grant	Decision (unanimous)	UFC 152	September 22, 2012	3	5:00	Toronto, Ontario, Canada	Fight of the Night.
Win	13–2	Nik Lentz	TKO (doctor stoppage)	UFC on Fox: Evans vs. Davis	January 28, 2012	2	5:00	Chicago, Illinois, United States	Fight of the Night.
Win	12–2	Shamar Bailey	Decision (unanimous)	UFC Fight Night: Shields vs. Ellenberger	September 17, 2011	3	5:00	New Orleans, Louisiana, United States	
Loss	11–2	Melvin Guillard	TKO (knees)	UFC: Fight for the Troops 2	January 22, 2011	1	2:58	Fort Hood, Texas, United States	
Loss	11–1	Sean Sherk	Decision (split)	UFC 119	September 25, 2010	3	5:00	Indianapolis, Indiana, United States	Fight of the Night.
Win	11–0	Tyson Griffin	Decision (split)	UFC 115	June 12, 2010	3	5:00	Vancouver, British Columbia, Canada	
Win	10–0	Efraín Escudero	Submission (armbar)	UFC Fight Night: Maynard vs. Diaz	January 11, 2010	3	1:59	Fairfax, Virginia, United States	Submission of the Night.
Win	9–0	Marcus Aurélio	Decision (split)	UFC 102	August 29, 2009	3	5:00	Portland, Oregon, United States	
Win	8–0	Per Eklund	TKO (punches)	UFC 95	February 21, 2009	1	2:13	London, England	
Win	7–0	Dustin Akbari	Submission (rear-naked choke)	PFC 12: High Stakes	January 22, 2009	3	0:40	Lemoore, California, United States	
Win	6–0	Eben Kaneshiro	TKO (punches)	RFC: Bragging Rights II	September 13, 2008	2	3:05	Eugene, Oregon, United States	
Win	5–0	Cleber Luciano	Submission (guillotine choke)	PFP: Ring of Fire	December 9, 2007	3	N/A	Quezon City, Philippines	
Win	4–0	Talon Hoffman	Submission (guillotine choke)	DesertBrawl	September 28, 2007	1	0:38	Bend, Oregon, United States	
Win	3–0	Mark Daoust	Submission (rear-naked choke)	Elite Warriors Championship	June 2, 2007	1	3:46	Portland, Oregon, United States	
Win	2–0	Nassor Lewis	Submission (armbar)	Rise FC 2: Hawaii vs. Mainland	April 28, 2007	1	1:16	Eugene, Oregon, United States	
Win	1–0	Gabriel Martinez	Decision (unanimous)	GC 62: Sprawl or Brawl	April 14, 2007	2	5:00	Lakeport, California, United States	

== See also ==
- List of current UFC fighters
- List of male mixed martial artists
