= Johny Hendricks =

American sport wrestler and mixed martial artist (born 1983)

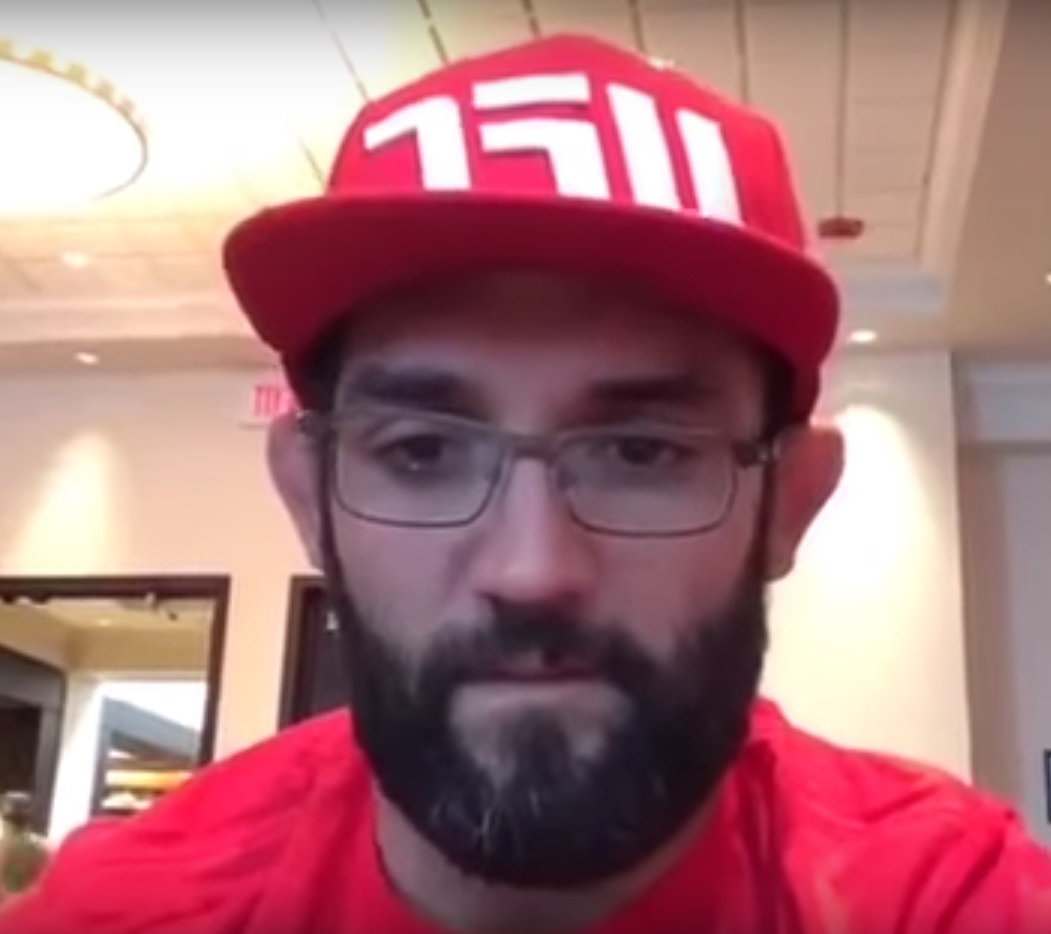
- Hendricks in 2017
- Born: September 12, 1983 (age 43); Ada, Oklahoma, U.S.
- Other names: Bigg Rigg
- Height: 5 ft 9 in (175 cm)
- Weight: 185 lb (84 kg; 13 st 3 lb)
- Division: Welterweight (2007–2016); Middleweight (2017–2018)
- Reach: 69 in (175 cm)
- Style: Wrestling
- Stance: Southpaw
- Fighting out of: Fort Worth, Texas, U.S.
- Team: Team Takedown; Jackson Wink MMA Academy
- Rank: Purple belt in Brazilian Jiu-Jitsu
- Wrestling: NCAA Division I Wrestling
- Years active: 2007–2018 (MMA)

Mixed martial arts record
- Total: 26
- Wins: 18
- By knockout: 8
- By submission: 1
- By decision: 9
- Losses: 8
- By knockout: 3
- By decision: 5

Other information
- University: Oklahoma State University
- Mixed martial arts record from Sherdog
Medal record
Men's collegiate wrestling
Representing the Oklahoma State Cowboys
NCAA Division I Championships
| Gold medal – first place | 2005 St. Louis | 165 lb |
| Gold medal – first place | 2006 Oklahoma City | 165 lb |
| Silver medal – second place | 2007 Auburn Hills | 165 lb |
Big 12 Championships
| Gold medal – first place | 2005 Omaha | 165 lb |
| Gold medal – first place | 2006 Ames | 165 lb |
| Gold medal – first place | 2007 Columbia | 165 lb |
| Silver medal – second place | 2004 Ames | 157 lb |

Johny Hendricks (born September 12, 1983) is an American former mixed martial artist and collegiate wrestler. He competed in the welterweight and middleweight divisions of the Ultimate Fighting Championship (UFC) and is a former UFC Welterweight Champion.

== Early life ==
Hendricks was born in Ada, Oklahoma. He was a three-time Oklahoma high school wrestling state champion and was a two-time high school national champion while at Edmond Memorial High School. His final high school record was 101–5. He would go on to attend college at Oklahoma State University (OSU).

After a 10–0 redshirt season in 2003, Hendricks finished 5th in the nation at 157 pounds in 2004, while compiling a 37–7 record. Hendricks moved up to 165 pounds for the next three seasons. He won the 2005 and 2006 Big 12 titles and NCAA Division I national championships. He was 27–4 in 2005 and 29–1 in 2006.

Going into the 2007 national championships final match, Hendricks had a record of 34–0 for the season and had won his third straight Big 12 title along the way. He suffered an upset loss to Mark Perry from the University of Iowa and finished 2nd in the nation. The four-time All-American for OSU finished with a college record of 159–13.

== Mixed martial arts career ==
=== Early career ===
After graduating from OSU in 2007, Hendricks moved to Las Vegas and trained at Cobra Kai Jiu Jitsu under Marc Laimon, along with two other former OSU wrestlers, Shane Roller and Jake Rosholt. Hendricks then later moved to Texas and signed with Team Takedown. This elite fighter management team funds fighters' training and splits his profits. Hendricks would go on to have his first career mixed martial arts (MMA) fight only seven months after his last collegiate wrestling match. He made his professional MMA debut on September 28, 2007, in which he scored a third-round controversial TKO victory over Victor Rackliff at Masters of the Cage 16 held in Oklahoma City, Oklahoma. Rackliff was getting the better of the exchanges on the feet and he rocked Hendricks in the 3rd when both fighters exchanged punches. Hendricks fought once more in 2007, defeating Spencer Cowley by second-round TKO at Snakebite Fight Night held in Tulsa, Oklahoma. Hendricks won his television debut on March 15, 2008, with a first-round submission victory over Richard Gamble at HDNet Fights Xtreme Fighting League, also in Tulsa.

=== World Extreme Cagefighting ===
Hendricks, Roller and Rosholt signed multi-fight deals with World Extreme Cagefighting (WEC).

While in the WEC, Hendricks defeated Justin Haskins on December 3, 2008, at WEC 37.

Next, Hendricks defeated Alex Serdyukov via unanimous decision on March 1, 2009, at WEC 39. which was the last 170-pound bout in WEC history due to the company's decision to dissolve its welterweight division and focus on lighter weight fighters.

=== Ultimate Fighting Championship ===
With the WEC eliminating his weight class, Hendricks had to find another place to fight and signed with the Ultimate Fighting Championship. In May 2009, it was announced that Hendricks would be making his UFC debut against Ultimate Fighter 7 champion Amir Sadollah at UFC 101 in Philadelphia, Pennsylvania, on August 8, 2009. In the opening seconds of the first round, Hendricks blocked a high head kick from Sadollah and countered with an uppercut, knocking Sadollah to his knees. Hendricks continued to land punches until referee Dan Miragliotta pulled him off and ended the fight 29 seconds into the first round. Some people criticized Miragliotta for stopping the fight too early, as Sadollah seemed to be trying to get up, but Miragliotta defended his stoppage, saying Sadollah was "out of it" and "still looked glassy eyed and asked me what happened."

Hendricks faced promotional newcomer Ricardo Funch on December 12, 2009, at UFC 107. Hendricks won the fight via unanimous decision (30–27, 30–27, and 30–25).

Hendricks next faced T. J. Grant on May 8, 2010, at UFC 113. Hendricks won the bout via majority decision, improving his record to 3–0 in the UFC.

He next faced Charlie Brenneman on August 7, 2010, at UFC 117. Hendricks defeated him via TKO in the second round.

Hendricks fought Rick Story on December 4, 2010, at The Ultimate Fighter 12 Finale. Hendricks lost via unanimous decision.

==== Win streak ====
Hendricks was expected to face Paulo Thiago on March 3, 2011, at UFC Live: Sanchez vs. Kampmann. However, Thiago was forced out of the bout with an elbow injury. Instead, Hendricks fought TJ Waldburger on March 26, 2011, at UFC Fight Night 24, replacing an injured Dennis Hallman. Hendricks won via first-round TKO, earning Knockout of the Night honors.

Hendricks faced Mike Pierce on August 6, 2011, at UFC 133. Hendricks won by split decision.

Hendricks fought longtime #2 welterweight Jon Fitch on December 30, 2011, at UFC 141. Hendricks became the first man to finish Fitch in the UFC, winning via knockout just 12 seconds into the first round. The performance also earned Knockout of the Night honors.

Hendricks next faced Josh Koscheck on May 5, 2012, in the co-main event at UFC on Fox: Diaz vs. Miller. He won the fight via split decision.

Hendricks faced Martin Kampmann on November 17, 2012, at UFC 154. Hendricks won via KO in the first round, with the fight only lasting 46 seconds. He earned Knockout of the Night honors for his performance.

Hendricks was expected to face Jake Ellenberger on March 16, 2013, at UFC 158. However, Hendricks was pulled from the Ellenberger bout in favor of a matchup with Carlos Condit at the event after Condit's original opponent, Rory MacDonald, pulled out of the bout with an injury. Hendricks won the fight via unanimous decision and both participants earned Fight of the Night honors.

==== Welterweight title bouts ====
Having earned his title shot, Hendricks faced Georges St-Pierre on November 16, 2013, at UFC 167 for the UFC Welterweight Championship. He lost via controversial split decision, a loss that UFC president Dana White felt was unwarranted as he publicly stated he believed Hendricks won the fight, though White later reportedly told St-Pierre that he had indeed won. In addition, the site MMADecisions.com reported that every one of the sixteen MMA media members whose scores they collect declared the fight a decision victory for Hendricks. Despite the controversy, the bout did earn him Fight of the Night honors in the UFC for the second time.

On December 13, 2013, news came that Georges St-Pierre would be taking an indefinite break from MMA and vacating his belt. Following this report, Dana White announced that Hendricks would be facing Robbie Lawler on March 15, 2014, at UFC 171 for the vacant UFC Welterweight Championship. Hendricks won the back-and-forth fight via unanimous decision. The bout also earned him his third consecutive Fight of the Night bonus award. Hendricks underwent surgery to repair a torn bicep that he sustained prior to his fight with Lawler. He returned to training in May 2014.

A rematch with Robbie Lawler took place at UFC 181 on December 6, 2014. After a strong start, Hendricks slowed in the later rounds and ultimately lost the fight and the title via split decision.

==== Post-championship fights ====
Hendricks faced Matt Brown on March 14, 2015, at UFC 185. While Brown had a limited amount of success on the feet, Hendricks was successful on nine of ten takedown attempts and neutralized Brown's attacks. Hendricks won the fight via unanimous decision.

Hendricks was expected to face Tyron Woodley on October 3, 2015, at UFC 192. However, the bout was scrapped prior to the weigh-ins due to an intestinal blockage and kidney stone attack suffered by Hendricks during the weight cut.

Hendricks faced Stephen Thompson on February 6, 2016, at UFC Fight Night 82. Despite being the betting favorite in this encounter, Hendricks had no answer for Thompson's striking and lost the bout via TKO in the first round, marking the first time Hendricks had ever been finished in his MMA career.

Hendricks faced Kelvin Gastelum on July 9, 2016, at UFC 200. He lost the fight via unanimous decision. Prior to the bout, Hendricks missed weight by a quarter of a pound and therefore surrendered 20% of his purse to Gastelum.

Hendricks faced Neil Magny on December 30, 2016, at UFC 207. At the weigh-ins, Hendricks once again missed weight, weighing in at 173.5 lbs., two and a half pounds over the welterweight limit. As a result, he forfeited 20% of his purse to Magny. Hendricks lost the bout by unanimous decision in what was a close and competitive fight. Prior to the fight, Hendricks announced his intentions to move up to middleweight after facing Magny due to the hard weight-cut.

==== Middleweight ====
After several struggles to make the welterweight limit, Hendricks opted to move up a weight class to the middleweight division. He faced Héctor Lombard in his middleweight debut on February 19, 2017, at UFC Fight Night 105. Hendricks won the fight via unanimous decision.

Hendricks faced Tim Boetsch on June 25, 2017, at UFC Fight Night 112. He missed weight for this event, and weighed in at 188 pounds, 2 pounds over the middleweight limit of 186 pounds for a non-championship fight. Hendricks lost the fight via TKO due to a head kick and punches early in the second round.

Hendricks faced Paulo Costa on November 4, 2017, at UFC 217. He lost the fight via TKO in the second round. It was the last fight on Hendricks's contract.

On June 27, 2018, Hendricks announced his retirement from competing in professional mixed martial arts and would concentrate on coaching wrestling.

== Bare knuckle boxing ==
Only a few months after retiring from mixed martial arts, news surfaced that Hendricks would be transitioning into bare knuckle boxing. His debut was expected to be against fellow retired mixed martial artist Brennan Ward at World Bare Knuckle Fighting Federation's inaugural event on November 9, 2018. During the fight week, Ward announced that he won't be competing at the event due to a contract dispute and was replaced by Dakota Cochrane. Cochrane defeated Hendricks by knock out in the second round.

== Personal life ==
Hendricks and his wife Christina have four children.

Hendricks has been sponsored by Reebok since UFC 167.

Hendricks's moniker, 'Bigg Rigg', is derived from his jiu-jitsu coach's comment that Hendricks hit like a Mack truck, having also owned a Ford F350 truck.

Hendricks is of German, Dutch, and Native American descent and a member of the Otoe–Missouria Tribe of Indians. His great great grandfather was an Otoe Missouri Tribal chief.

After retiring from mixed martial arts competition, Hendricks began working as a police officer in Texas.

== Championships and accomplishments ==
=== Collegiate wrestling ===
- National Collegiate Athletic Association (NCAA)
  - NCAA Division I All-American out of Oklahoma State University (2004, 2005, 2006, 2007)
  - NCAA Division I 157 lb – 5th place out of Oklahoma State University (2004)
  - NCAA Division I 165 lb – Champion out of Oklahoma State University (2005)
  - NCAA Division I 165 lb – Champion out of Oklahoma State University (2006)
  - NCAA Division I 165 lb – Runner-up out of Oklahoma State University (2007)
  - Big 12 Conference Championship out of Oklahoma State University (2005), (2006), (2007)

=== Amateur wrestling ===
- USA Junior Freestyle Championship
  - USA Junior Freestyle Championship 165 1b – Winner out of Oklahoma (2001)
  - USA Junior Freestyle Championship 165 1b – Winner out of Oklahoma (2002)

=== Mixed martial arts ===
- Ultimate Fighting Championship
  - UFC Welterweight Championship (One time)
  - Knockout of the Night (Three times) vs. TJ Waldburger, Jon Fitch and Martin Kampmann
  - Fight of the Night (Three times) vs. Carlos Condit, Georges St-Pierre and Robbie Lawler 1
  - Fifth most takedowns landed in UFC Welterweight division history (61)
  - UFC.com Awards
    - 2009: Ranked #6 Newcomer of the Year
    - 2011: Ranked #7 Fighter of the Year, Ranked #4 Knockout of the Year vs. Jon Fitch & Ranked #2 Upset of the Year vs. Jon Fitch
    - 2013: Ranked #10 Fight of the Year vs. Georges St-Pierre, Ranked #5 Fight of the Year & Half-Year Awards: Best Fight of the 1HY vs. Carlos Condit
    - 2014: Fight of the Year vs. vs. Robbie Lawler 1 at UFC 171
- World Extreme Cagefighting
  - Fight of the Night (One time)
- MMA Valor
  - 2012 Fighter of the Year
- MMA Fighting
  - 2014 Fight of the Year vs. Robbie Lawler at UFC 171
- Sherdog
  - 2014 Fight of the Year vs. Robbie Lawler at UFC 171
- MMA Junkie
  - 2014 March Fight of the Month vs. Robbie Lawler
- Bleacher Report
  - 2012 #7 Ranked Fighter of the Year
  - 2014 Fight of the Year vs. Robbie Lawler at UFC 171
- Wrestling Observer Newsletter awards
  - 2014 MMA Match of the Year vs. Robbie Lawler at UFC 171
- Combat Press
  - 2014 Fight of the Year vs. Robbie Lawler at UFC 171
- Yahoo Sports
  - 2014 Fight of the Year vs. Robbie Lawler at UFC 171

== Mixed martial arts record ==
Professional record breakdown
| 26 matches | 18 wins | 8 losses |
| By knockout | 8 | 3 |
| By submission | 1 | 0 |
| By decision | 9 | 5 |

| Res. | Record | Opponent | Method | Event | Date | Round | Time | Location | Notes |
|---|---|---|---|---|---|---|---|---|---|
| Loss | 18–8 | Paulo Costa | TKO (punches) | UFC 217 | November 4, 2017 | 2 | 1:23 | New York City, New York, United States | |
| Loss | 18–7 | Tim Boetsch | TKO (head kick and punches) | UFC Fight Night: Chiesa vs. Lee | June 25, 2017 | 2 | 0:46 | Oklahoma City, Oklahoma, United States | Catchweight (188 lbs) bout; Hendricks missed weight. |
| Win | 18–6 | Héctor Lombard | Decision (unanimous) | UFC Fight Night: Lewis vs. Browne | February 19, 2017 | 3 | 5:00 | Halifax, Nova Scotia, Canada | Middleweight debut. |
| Loss | 17–6 | Neil Magny | Decision (unanimous) | UFC 207 | December 30, 2016 | 3 | 5:00 | Las Vegas, Nevada, United States | Catchweight (173.5 lbs) bout; Hendricks missed weight. |
| Loss | 17–5 | Kelvin Gastelum | Decision (unanimous) | UFC 200 | July 9, 2016 | 3 | 5:00 | Las Vegas, Nevada, United States | Catchweight (171.25 lbs) bout; Hendricks missed weight. |
| Loss | 17–4 | Stephen Thompson | TKO (punches) | UFC Fight Night: Hendricks vs. Thompson | February 6, 2016 | 1 | 3:31 | Las Vegas, Nevada, United States | |
| Win | 17–3 | Matt Brown | Decision (unanimous) | UFC 185 | March 14, 2015 | 3 | 5:00 | Dallas, Texas, United States | |
| Loss | 16–3 | Robbie Lawler | Decision (split) | UFC 181 | December 6, 2014 | 5 | 5:00 | Las Vegas, Nevada, United States | Lost the UFC Welterweight Championship. |
| Win | 16–2 | Robbie Lawler | Decision (unanimous) | UFC 171 | March 15, 2014 | 5 | 5:00 | Dallas, Texas, United States | Won the vacant UFC Welterweight Championship. Fight of the Night. |
| Loss | 15–2 | Georges St-Pierre | Decision (split) | UFC 167 | November 16, 2013 | 5 | 5:00 | Las Vegas, Nevada, United States | For the UFC Welterweight Championship. Fight of the Night. |
| Win | 15–1 | Carlos Condit | Decision (unanimous) | UFC 158 | March 16, 2013 | 3 | 5:00 | Montreal, Quebec, Canada | UFC Welterweight title eliminator. Fight of the Night. |
| Win | 14–1 | Martin Kampmann | KO (punch) | UFC 154 | November 17, 2012 | 1 | 0:46 | Montreal, Quebec, Canada | Knockout of the Night. |
| Win | 13–1 | Josh Koscheck | Decision (split) | UFC on Fox: Diaz vs. Miller | May 5, 2012 | 3 | 5:00 | East Rutherford, New Jersey, United States | |
| Win | 12–1 | Jon Fitch | KO (punch) | UFC 141 | December 30, 2011 | 1 | 0:12 | Las Vegas, Nevada, United States | Knockout of the Night. |
| Win | 11–1 | Mike Pierce | Decision (split) | UFC 133 | August 6, 2011 | 3 | 5:00 | Philadelphia, Pennsylvania, United States | |
| Win | 10–1 | TJ Waldburger | TKO (punches) | UFC Fight Night: Nogueira vs. Davis | March 26, 2011 | 1 | 1:35 | Seattle, Washington, United States | Knockout of the Night. |
| Loss | 9–1 | Rick Story | Decision (unanimous) | The Ultimate Fighter: Team GSP vs. Team Koscheck Finale | December 4, 2010 | 3 | 5:00 | Las Vegas, Nevada, United States | |
| Win | 9–0 | Charlie Brenneman | TKO (punches) | UFC 117 | August 7, 2010 | 2 | 0:40 | Oakland, California, United States | |
| Win | 8–0 | T. J. Grant | Decision (majority) | UFC 113 | May 8, 2010 | 3 | 5:00 | Montreal, Quebec, Canada | |
| Win | 7–0 | Ricardo Funch | Decision (unanimous) | UFC 107 | December 12, 2009 | 3 | 5:00 | Memphis, Tennessee, United States | |
| Win | 6–0 | Amir Sadollah | TKO (punches) | UFC 101 | August 8, 2009 | 1 | 0:29 | Philadelphia, Pennsylvania, United States | |
| Win | 5–0 | Alex Serdyukov | Decision (unanimous) | WEC 39 | March 1, 2009 | 3 | 5:00 | Corpus Christi, Texas, United States | Fight of the Night. |
| Win | 4–0 | Justin Haskins | TKO (punches) | WEC 37 | December 3, 2008 | 2 | 0:43 | Las Vegas, Nevada, United States | |
| Win | 3–0 | Richard Gamble | Submission (D'Arce choke) | Xtreme Fighting League 1 | March 15, 2008 | 1 | 1:45 | Tulsa, Oklahoma, United States | |
| Win | 2–0 | Spencer Cowley | KO (punches) | Shark Fight Night | November 16, 2007 | 2 | 0:35 | Tulsa, Oklahoma, United States | |
| Win | 1–0 | Victor Rackliff | TKO (doctor stoppage) | Battle of the Cage 16 | September 28, 2007 | 3 | 1:54 | Oklahoma City, Oklahoma, United States | |

== NCAA record ==
NCAA Championships Matches
| Res. | Record | Opponent | Score | Date | Event |
2007 NCAA Championships (silver) at 165 lbs
| Loss | 18-3 | Mark Perry | 3-4 | March 17, 2007 | 2007 NCAA Division I Wrestling Championships |
| Win | 18-2 | Travis Paulson | TB 2-1 | March 17, 2007 | 2007 NCAA Division I Wrestling Championships |
| Win | 17-2 | Matt Pell | Major 10-2 | March 17, 2007 | 2007 NCAA Division I Wrestling Championships |
| Win | 16-2 | Justin Fraga | Tech Fall 20-5 | March 17, 2007 | 2007 NCAA Division I Wrestling Championships |
| Win | 15-2 | Daniel Atondo | Fall | March 17, 2007 | 2007 NCAA Division I Wrestling Championships |
2006 NCAA Championships (gold) at 165 lbs
| Win | 14-2 | Ryan Churella | 9-8 | March 18, 2006 | 2006 NCAA Division I Wrestling Championships |
| Win | 13-2 | Muzaffar Abdurakhmanov | 4-3 | March 18, 2006 | 2006 NCAA Division I Wrestling Championships |
| Win | 12-2 | Dan Thompson | 9-6 | March 18, 2006 | 2006 NCAA Division I Wrestling Championships |
| Win | 11-2 | Garrett Atkinson | Fall | March 18, 2006 | 2006 NCAA Division I Wrestling Championships |
| Win | 10-2 | Brian Busby | Tech Fall 25-8 | March 18, 2006 | 2006 NCAA Division I Wrestling Championships |
2005 NCAA Championships (gold) at 165 lbs
| Win | 9-2 | Mark Perry | 5-2 | March 19, 2005 | 2005 NCAA Division I Wrestling Championships |
| Win | 8-2 | Ryan Churella | 6-2 | March 19, 2005 | 2005 NCAA Division I Wrestling Championships |
| Win | 7-2 | John Sioredas | Fall | March 19, 2005 | 2005 NCAA Division I Wrestling Championships |
| Win | 6-2 | Joey Hooker | Major 12-3 | March 19, 2005 | 2005 NCAA Division I Wrestling Championships |
| Win | 5-2 | Garry Price | Fall | March 19, 2005 | 2005 NCAA Division I Wrestling Championships |
2004 NCAA Championships 5th at 157 lbs
| Loss | 4-2 | Alex Tirapelle | 1-4 | March 20, 2004 | 2004 NCAA Division I Wrestling Championships |
| Win | 4-1 | Phillip Simpson | 4-2 | March 20, 2004 | 2004 NCAA Division I Wrestling Championships |
| Win | 3-1 | Charlie Brenneman | Major 11-1 | March 20, 2004 | 2004 NCAA Division I Wrestling Championships |
| Loss | 2-1 | Ryan Bertin | 4-7 | March 20, 2004 | 2004 NCAA Division I Wrestling Championships |
| Win | 2-0 | Derek Zinck | 2-1 | March 20, 2004 | 2004 NCAA Division I Wrestling Championships |
| Win | 1-0 | Brian Cobb | TB 6-5 | March 20, 2004 | 2004 NCAA Division I Wrestling Championships |

== Pay-per-view bouts ==
| No. | Event | Fight | Date | Venue | City | PPV Buys | Attendance |
|---|---|---|---|---|---|---|---|
| 1. | UFC 167 | St-Pierre vs. Hendricks | November 16, 2013 | MGM Grand Garden Arena | Las Vegas, Nevada, United States | 630,000 | 14,856 |
| 2. | UFC 171 | Hendricks vs. Lawler | March 15, 2014 | American Airlines Center | Dallas, Texas, United States | 300,000 | 19,324 |
| 3. | UFC 181 | Hendricks vs. Lawler 2 | December 6, 2014 | Mandalay Bay Events Center | Las Vegas, Nevada, United States | 400,000 | 11,617 |

== Bareknuckle boxing record ==
Professional record breakdown
| 1 match | 0 wins | 1 loss |
| By knockout | 0 | 1 |

| Res. | Record | Opponent | Method | Event | Date | Round | Time | Location | Notes |
|---|---|---|---|---|---|---|---|---|---|
| Loss | 0–1 | Dakota Cochrane | TKO (punches) | World Bare Knuckle Fighting Federation | November 9, 2018 | 2 | 0:21 | Casper, Wyoming, United States | |

== See also ==
- List of current UFC fighters
- List of male mixed martial artists

| Vacant Title last held by Georges St-Pierre | 9th UFC Welterweight Champion; March 15, 2014 – December 6, 2014 | Succeeded by Robbie Lawler |
