= Bellator MMA & Glory: Dynamite 1 =

Bellator MMA event in 2015

Bellator 142: Dynamite 1
- Date: September 19, 2015
- City: San Jose, California, USA
- Venue: SAP Center
- Attendance: 11,732

Bellator MMA event chronology
← Previous; Bellator 141: Guillard vs. Girtz	Next → Bellator 143: Warren vs. Davis

Glory event chronology
← Previous; Glory 23: Las Vegas	Next → Glory 24: Denver

Bellator MMA & Glory: Dynamite 1 (also known as Bellator 142: Dynamite 1) was a mixed martial arts and kickboxing hybrid event held on September 19, 2015 at the SAP Center in San Jose, California, USA. The event aired live and free in prime time on Spike.

== Background ==
The event was announced on air during a special pre-Bellator 138 press conference as a three-tier hybrid show with Glory Kickboxing. Similar super-shows have long taken place in Japan. As a tribute to these, the main card fighters were introduced as a group at the top of the TV broadcast by Lenne Hardt, best known for her work as English-language ring announcer for various Japanese MMA and kickboxing promotions. The event was headlined by a Bellator Light Heavyweight Championship fight between current champion Liam McGeary and UFC veteran Tito Ortiz.

The second tier of the show was a Glory Kickboxing card that was headlined by a bout for the vacant Glory Light Heavyweight Championship between Saulo Cavalari and Zack Mwekassa. This portion of the card also featured Bellator mixed martial artist Paul Daley.

The third tier of the show was a one night, four-man light heavyweight tournament featuring Phil Davis, Muhammed Lawal, Emanuel Newton and Linton Vassell. The winner of this tournament will secure a title shot against the winner of the title fight between McGeary and Ortiz. Muhammed Lawal was slated to face-off against Phil Davis in the Bellator Light Heavyweight Tournament Final. However, Lawal was pulled out of the bout at the last minute due to injury and was replaced by Bellator Light Heavyweight Tournament Alternate winner Francis Carmont.

Four bouts - Victor Jones vs. David Blanco, Gloria Telles vs. Alysia Cortez, Jose Palacios vs. TJ Arcengal and Brandon Hester vs. DeMarco Villalona - took place simultaneously inside the cage and the ring.

During intermission after the Phil Davis vs. Francis Carmont light heavyweight tournament finale bout and shortly before the Liam McGeary (c) vs. Tito Ortiz light heavyweight championship fight, Bellator MMA ring announcer Michael C. Williams announced to the live SAP Center at San Jose crowd attendance of 11,732.

Thus making Bellator MMA & Glory: Dynamite 1 the largest attended show in Bellator MMA history, until being surpassed by Bellator 149 at the Toyota Center in Houston, TX with a live paid crowd attendance of 14,209. Bellator 149 (Shamrock vs. Gracie III) had a double main event featuring a heavyweight battle between Miami, FL Dade County street fighters Kimbo Slice and Dada 5000. Along with MMA light heavyweight pioneers Ken Shamrock and Royce Gracie facing off for the 3rd time.

== Results ==
Main Card (Spike TV)
Weight class				Method	Round	Time	Notes
Light Heavyweight (MMA)	Liam McGeary (c)	def.	Tito Ortiz	Submission (inverted-triangle choke)	1	4:41	(Note: For the Bellator Light Heavyweight Championship.)
Light Heavyweight (MMA)	Phil Davis	def.	Francis Carmont	KO (punches)	1	2:15	(Note: Bellator Light Heavyweight Tournament Final.)
Light Heavyweight (Kickboxing)	Saulo Cavalari	def.	Zack Mwekassa	Decision (majority) (48-46, 48-46, 47-47)	5	3:00	(Note: For the vacant Glory Light Heavyweight Championship.)
Lightweight (MMA)	Josh Thomson	def.	Mike Bronzoulis	Submission (arm-triangle choke)	3	0:39
Catchweight (175 lbs) (Kickboxing)	Paul Daley	def.	Fernando Gonzalez	Decision (unanimous) (29-28, 29-28, 30-27)	3	3:00
Women's Bantamweight (Kickboxing)	Keri Taylor-Melendez	def.	Hadley Griffith	Decision (unanimous) (30-27, 30-27, 30-26)	3	3:00
Light Heavyweight (MMA)	Phil Davis	def.	Emanuel Newton	Submission (kimura)	1	4:39	(Note: Bellator Light Heavyweight Tournament Semifinal.)
Light Heavyweight (MMA)	Muhammed Lawal	def.	Linton Vassell	Decision (unanimous)	2	5:00	(Note: Bellator Light Heavyweight Tournament Semifinal.)
Preliminary Card (Spike.com)
Bantamweight (MMA)	Gabe Carrasco	def.	Joe Neal	Decision (unanimous) (30-27, 29-28, 29-28)	3	5:00
Lightweight (MMA)	Adam Piccolotti	def.	Salvador Becerra	Submission (rear-naked choke)	2	1:47
Featherweight (Kickboxing)	Serhiy Adamchuk	def.	Anvar Boynazarov	Decision (unanimous) (30-27, 30-27, 30-27)	3	3:00	(Note: Glory Featherweight Championship title eliminator.)
Featherweight (Kickboxing)	Jose Palacios	def.	TJ Arcengal	Decision (split) (29-28, 29-28, 30-27)	3	3:00
Featherweight (MMA)	Ousmane Thomas Diagne	vs.	Mike Malott	Draw (majority) (29-28, 28-28, 28-28)	3	5:00
Light Heavyweight (MMA)	Francis Carmont	def.	Anthony Ruiz	Decision (unanimous)	2	5:00	(Note: Bellator Light Heavyweight Tournament Alternate.)
Postliminary Card (Dark Bouts)
Featherweight (MMA)	David Blanco	def.	Victor Jones	Decision (unanimous)	3	5:00
Women's Flyweight (MMA)	Alysia Cortez	def.	Gloria Telles	Decision (unanimous)	3	5:00
Lightweight (MMA)	Nick Pica	def.	Mauricio Alonso	Decision (unanimous)	3	5:00
Middleweight (MMA)	Brandon Hester	def.	DeMarco Villalona	Submission (Triangle choke)	1	3:06
Lightweight (MMA)	J.J. Okanovich	def.	Israel Delgado	Decision (unanimous)	3	5:00
Welterweight (MMA)	James Terry	def.	Carlos Eduardo Rocha	TKO (Punches)	1	4:00
Flyweight (MMA)	Josh Paiva	def.	Matt Ramirez	Submission (Armbar)	1	2:56

== Bellator Light Heavyweight Tournament bracket ==
Semi-finals
(United States) Phil Davis	SUB
(United States) Emanuel Newton	1
(United States) Muhammed Lawal	UD
(England) Linton Vassell	2

Final
(United States) Phil Davis	KO
(France) Francis Carmont*	1

- Alternate Carmont replaced an injured Lawal in the finals.

== See also ==
- Bellator MMA in 2015
- 2015 in Glory
