= UFC 113 =

UFC mixed martial arts event in 2010

UFC 113: Machida vs. Shogun 2
- The poster for UFC 113: Machida vs. Shogun 2
- Promotion: Ultimate Fighting Championship
- Date: May 8, 2010
- Venue: Bell Centre
- City: Montreal, Quebec, Canada
- Attendance: 17,647
- Total gate: $3,270,000
- Buyrate: 520,000

Event chronology
UFC 112: Invincible	UFC 113: Machida vs. Shogun 2	UFC 114: Rampage vs. Evans

UFC 113: Machida vs. Shogun 2 was a mixed martial arts event held by the Ultimate Fighting Championship on May 8, 2010, at the Bell Centre in Montreal, Quebec, Canada.

== Background ==
UFC 113 featured the rematch between Lyoto Machida and Maurício Rua for the UFC Light Heavyweight Championship. The two first met at UFC 104, where Lyoto Machida retained his belt in a controversial unanimous decision victory. It also featured the official pay-per-view and introduction of Kimbo Slice into the heavyweight division of the UFC.

For the co-main event, a bout between former Light Heavyweight champions Rashad Evans and Quinton Jackson was initially linked to this event, but was subsequently moved to UFC 114 where the pairing served as the headliner.

Tim Credeur was scheduled to face Tom Lawlor, but was forced from the card with an injury and replaced by Joe Doerksen.

Joey Beltran was set to fight Chad Corvin, however after Corvin's paperwork was not approved by the Quebec Athletic Commission, Beltran ended up fighting Tim Hague.

Nick Catone was forced out of his bout with John Salter due to a back injury. UFC veteran David Loiseau was supposed to step in as his replacement, but Loiseau was denied a license to appear on this card due to alleged ties to organized crime. Salter ended up fighting returning UFC fighter Jason MacDonald. Loiseau would still make his return to the UFC having faced Mario Miranda at UFC 115.

According to UFC President Dana White, the winner of the Josh Koscheck-Paul Daley fight would receive a title shot with Georges St-Pierre for the UFC Welterweight Championship and be the opposing coach to St. Pierre in the upcoming twelfth season of the UFC reality TV show, The Ultimate Fighter.

== Results ==
Main Card
Weight class				Method	Round	Time	Notes
Light Heavyweight	Maurício Rua	def.	Lyoto Machida (c)	KO (punches)	1	3:35	(Note: For the UFC Light Heavyweight Championship.)
Welterweight	Josh Koscheck	def.	Paul Daley	Decision (unanimous) (30–27, 30–27, 30–27)	3	5:00
Lightweight	Jeremy Stephens	def.	Sam Stout	Decision (split) (30–27, 29–28, 28–29)	3	5:00
Heavyweight	Matt Mitrione	def.	Kimbo Slice	TKO (punches)	2	4:24
Middleweight	Alan Belcher	def.	Patrick Côté	Submission (rear-naked choke)	2	3:25
Preliminary card
Weight class				Method	Round	Time	Notes
Middleweight	Joe Doerksen	def.	Tom Lawlor	Submission (rear-naked choke)	2	2:10
Welterweight	Marcus Davis	def.	Jonathan Goulet	TKO (punches)	2	1:23
Welterweight	Johny Hendricks	def.	T. J. Grant	Decision (majority) (29–27, 29–27, 28–28)	3	5:00	(Note: Grant had 1 point deducted in round 3 for a second accidental kick to the groin.)
Heavyweight	Joey Beltran	def.	Tim Hague	Decision (unanimous) (30–27, 30–26, 29–28)	3	5:00
Welterweight	Mike Guymon	def.	Yoshiyuki Yoshida	Decision (unanimous) (30–27, 30–27, 30–27)	3	5:00
Middleweight	John Salter	def.	Jason MacDonald	TKO (ankle injury)	1	2:42

== Post event ==
After the bell sounded to signify the end of the final round, Koscheck walked back to his corner with a visibly upset Paul Daley following. What looked to be a gesture of good sportsmanship turned out to be a sucker punch delivered by Daley which Koscheck blocked. In the post-fight press conference, Koscheck went on to say, "Oh yeah, it hurt. It was the best shot he landed all night." Dana White stated "He [Daley] will never fight in the UFC again."

Kimbo Slice, only 1-1 in UFC fights at the time, was to be subsequently released from the UFC despite losing in only his second fight for the promotion. In the post fight press conference, Dana White stated the bout was "probably Kimbo's last fight in the UFC." He still praised Slice and admitted he made it farther in the promotion than he thought, stating "He's impressed me as a human being and as a fighter, and I like him and the guys who represent him very much. I'm glad to have met Kimbo Slice."

== Bonus awards ==
The following fighters received $65,000 bonuses.

- Fight of the Night: Jeremy Stephens vs. Sam Stout
- Knockout of the Night: Maurício Rua
- Submission of the Night: Alan Belcher

== See also ==
- Ultimate Fighting Championship
- List of UFC champions
- List of UFC events
- 2010 in UFC
