= UFC 114 =

UFC mixed martial arts event in 2010

UFC 114: Rampage vs. Evans
- The poster for UFC 114: Rampage vs. Evans
- Promotion: Ultimate Fighting Championship
- Date: May 29, 2010
- Venue: MGM Grand Garden Arena
- City: Las Vegas, Nevada
- Attendance: 14,996
- Total gate: $3,895,000
- Buyrate: 1,050,000

Event chronology
UFC 113: Machida vs. Shogun 2	UFC 114: Rampage vs. Evans	UFC 115: Liddell vs. Franklin

UFC 114: Rampage vs. Evans was a mixed martial arts event held by the Ultimate Fighting Championship on May 29, 2010, at the MGM Grand Garden Arena in Las Vegas, Nevada. The UFC Fan Expo took place at the Mandalay Bay Convention Center.

== Background ==
Spike TV once again broadcast two live preliminary bouts one hour before the PPV broadcast began. In addition, the three-part UFC Primetime series returned to Spike TV in the build up for this event.

The full fight card featured five Ultimate Fighter season champions (Rashad Evans, Michael Bisping, Diego Sanchez, Amir Sadollah and Efraín Escudero), making it just the second UFC event (after The Ultimate Fighter: United States vs. United Kingdom Finale the previous year) to feature 5 TUF champions. Another Ultimate Fighter winner, Forrest Griffin, was also scheduled to compete at this event, but had to pull out due to injury.

A bout between Forrest Griffin and Antônio Rogério Nogueira was scheduled for this event, however Griffin withdrew due to a shoulder injury. Griffin was replaced by Jason Brilz.

Melvin Guillard was scheduled to face Thiago Tavares, but Tavares was forced off the card with an elbow injury. Waylon Lowe then stepped in as Tavares' replacement.

UFC President Dana White confirmed that the winner between Jackson vs. Evans would fight UFC Light Heavyweight Champion Mauricio Rua for the title in their next bout, but it never took place after Rashad Evans (who won the UFC 114 main event) was injured and ultimately replaced by Jon Jones for the title match at UFC 128 in March 2011. Rua's manager had originally suggested he could see Rua's first title defense against Randy Couture, though that bout was not likely to occur.

Jackson was originally supposed to fight Evans for the title after defeating Keith Jardine at UFC 96 in March 2009, but a jaw injury during that fight allowed Lyoto Machida to replace him in the UFC 98 title fight, which Machida won. Jackson was then expected to fight for the title against Machida, but instead became a coach on The Ultimate Fighter: Heavyweights against Evans.

== Results ==
Main Card
Weight class				Method	Round	Time	Notes
Light Heavyweight	Rashad Evans	def.	Quinton Jackson	Decision (unanimous) (29–28, 29–28, 29–28)	3	5:00
Middleweight	Michael Bisping	def.	Dan Miller	Decision (unanimous) (30–27, 30–27, 29–28)	3	5:00
Heavyweight	Mike Russow	def.	Todd Duffee	KO (punch)	3	2:32
Light Heavyweight	Antônio Rogério Nogueira	def.	Jason Brilz	Decision (split) (28–29, 29–28, 29–28)	3	5:00
Welterweight	John Hathaway	def.	Diego Sanchez	Decision (unanimous) (30–27, 30–27, 30–26)	3	5:00
Preliminary card (Spike TV)
Welterweight	Dong Hyun Kim	def.	Amir Sadollah	Decision (unanimous) (30–27, 30–27, 30–27)	3	5:00
Lightweight	Efraín Escudero	def.	Dan Lauzon	Decision (unanimous) (29–27, 29–27, 29–27)	3	5:00	(Note: Escudero had 1 point deducted in round 3 for accidental kicks to the groin.)
Preliminary card
Lightweight	Melvin Guillard	def.	Waylon Lowe	TKO (knee to the body)	1	3:28
Light Heavyweight	Cyrille Diabaté	def.	Luiz Cane	TKO (punches)	1	2:13
Lightweight	Aaron Riley	def.	Joe Brammer	Decision (unanimous) (30–27, 30–27, 30–27)	3	5:00
Middleweight	Ryan Jensen	def.	Jesse Forbes	Submission (guillotine choke)	1	1:06

== Bonus awards ==
The following fighters received $65,000 bonuses.

- Fight of the Night: Antônio Rogério Nogueira vs. Jason Brilz
- Knockout of the Night: Mike Russow
- Submission of the Night: Ryan Jensen

== Reported payout ==
The following is the reported payout to the fighters as reported to the Nevada State Athletic Commission. It does not include sponsor money or "locker room" bonuses often given by the UFC and also do not include the UFC's traditional "fight night" bonuses.

- Rashad Evans $410,000 ($185,000 win bonus) def. Quinton Jackson $250,000
- Michael Bisping $325,000 ($150,000 win bonus) def. Dan Miller $15,000
- Mike Russow $24,000 ($12,000 win bonus) def. Todd Duffee $8,000
- Antônio Rogério Nogueira $120,000 ($40,000 win bonus) def. Jason Brilz $11,000
- John Hathaway $22,000 ($11,000 win bonus) def. Diego Sanchez $50,000
- Dong Hyun Kim $64,000 ($32,000 win bonus) def. Amir Sadollah $15,000
- Efrain Escudero $30,000 ($15,000 win bonus) def. Dan Lauzon $15,000
- Melvin Guillard $38,000 ($19,000 win bonus) def. Waylon Lowe $6,000
- Cyrille Diabate $12,000 ($6,000 win bonus) def. Luiz Cane $19,000
- Aaron Riley $20,000 ($10,000 win bonus) def. Joe Brammer $5,000
- Ryan Jensen $16,000 ($8,000 win bonus) def. Jesse Forbes $6,000

== See also ==
- Ultimate Fighting Championship
- List of UFC champions
- List of UFC events
- 2010 in UFC
