= 2010 in UFC =

Mixed martial arts events

Information
- First date: January 2, 2010
- Last date: December 11, 2010

Events
- Total events: 24
- UFC: 17
- UFC on Versus: 2
- UFC Fight Night: 3
- TUF Finale events: 2

Fights
- Total fights: 255
- Title fights: 10

Chronology
2009 in UFC	2010 in UFC	2011 in UFC

The year 2010 was the 18th year in the history of the Ultimate Fighting Championship (UFC), a mixed martial arts promotion based in the United States. In 2010 the UFC held 24 events beginning with, UFC 108: Evans vs. Silva.

== 2010 UFC.com awards ==
2010 UFC.COM Awards
No	Best Fighter	The Upsets	The Submissions	The Newcomers	The Knockouts	The Fights
1	Frankie Edgar	Frankie Edgar defeats B.J. Penn 1 UFC 112	Anderson Silva defeats Chael Sonnen 1 UFC 117	Phil Davis	Cain Velasquez defeats Brock Lesnar; UFC 121	Anderson Silva defeats Chael Sonnen 1 UFC 117
2	Cain Velasquez	Mike Russow defeats Todd Duffee; UFC 114	Cole Miller defeats Dan Lauzon; UFC 108	Jake Shields	Maurício Rua defeats Lyoto Machida; UFC 113	Chris Leben defeats Yoshihiro Akiyama; UFC 116
3	Maurício Rua	John Hathaway defeats Diego Sanchez; UFC 114	Matt Hughes defeats Ricardo Almeida; UFC 117	Charles Oliveira	B.J. Penn defeats Matt Hughes 3 UFC 123	Stephan Bonnar defeats Krzysztof Soszynski 2 UFC 116
4	George Sotiropoulos	Joey Beltran defeats Rolles Gracie Jr. UFC 109	Chris Lytle defeats Matt Brown; UFC 110	Kyle Noke	Mike Russow defeats Tim Hague; UFC 114	Brock Lesnar defeats Shane Carwin; UFC 116
5	Georges St-Pierre	Sean McCorkle defeats Mark Hunt; UFC 119	Mark Bocek defeats Dustin Hazelett; UFC 124	Court McGee	Pablo Garza defeats Fredson Paixão; The Ultimate Fighter 12 Finale	Sean Sherk defeats Evan Dunham; UFC 119
6	Junior dos Santos	Ryan Bader defeats Antônio Rogério Nogueira; UFC 119	Brock Lesnar defeats Shane Carwin; UFC 116	Joey Beltran	Gerald Harris defeats David Branch; UFC 116	Carlos Condit defeats Rory MacDonald; UFC 115
7	Jim Miller	Mike Pyle defeats John Hathaway; UFC 120	C. B. Dollaway defeats Joe Doerksen; UFC 119	Daniel Roberts	Cain Velasquez defeats Antônio Rogério Nogueira; UFC 110	George Sotiropoulos defeats Joe Lauzon; UFC 123
8	Yushin Okami	Matt Brown defeats Mike Swick; UFC on Fox: Henderson vs. Diaz	Rousimar Palhares defeats Tomasz Drwal; UFC 111	Jonathan Brookins	Rich Franklin defeats Chuck Liddell; UFC 115	Mark Muñoz defeats Aaron Simpson; UFC 123
9	Rashad Evans	Rafael dos Anjos defeats Terry Etim; UFC 112	Phil Davis defeats Tim Boetsch; UFC 123	Rory MacDonald	Carlos Condit defeats Dan Hardy; UFC 120	Diego Sanchez defeats Paulo Thiago; UFC 119
10	Rick Story (Tie); Evan Dunham (Tie); Chris Leben (Tie)	Joe Doerksen defeats Tom Lawlor; UFC 113	Jim Miller defeats Charles Oliveira 1 UFC 124	Claude Patrick	Takanori Gomi defeats Tyson Griffin; UFC Live: Jones vs. Matyushenko	Jeremy Stephens defeats Sam Stout; UFC 113
Ref						

== Debut UFC fighters ==
The following fighters fought their first UFC fight in 2010:

ISO	Fighter	Division
(England)	Aaron Wilkinson	Welterweight
(Brazil)	Alexandre Ferreira	Light Heavyweight
(Brazil)	Amilcar Alves	Welterweight
(United States)	Brad Tavares	Middleweight
(Brazil)	Carlos Eduardo Rocha	Welterweight
(Brazil)	Charles Oliveira	Lightweight
(United States)	Charlie Brenneman	Welterweight
(United States)	Chris Camozzi	Middleweight
(United States)	Christian Morecraft	Heavyweight
(Canada)	Claude Patrick	Welterweight
(United States)	Cody McKenzie	Lightweight
(United States)	Court McGee	Middleweight
(France)	Cyrille Diabaté	Light Heavyweight
(United States)	Daniel Roberts	Welterweight
(United States)	Darren Elkins	Lightweight
(United States)	David Branch	Middleweight
(United States)	David Mitchell	Welterweight
(South Korea)	Dongi Yang	Middleweight
(Brazil)	Edson Barboza	Lightweight
(Brazil)	Fabio Maldonado	Light Heavyweight
(Brazil)	Fredson Paixão	Bantamweight
(United States)	Gerald Harris	Middleweight
(Netherlands)	Gilbert Yvel	Heavyweight
(United States)	Greg Soto	Welterweight
(United States)	Ian Loveland	Bantamweight
(United States)	Jake Shields	Welterweight
(United States)	James Hammortree	Middleweight

ISO	Fighter	Division
(New Zealand)	James Te Huna	Light Heavyweight
(United States)	James Toney	Heavyweight
(United States)	Jamie Yeager	Lightweight
(United States)	Jason High	Welterweight
(Canada)	Jesse Bongfeldt	Middleweight
(United States)	Joey Beltran	Heavyweight
(United States)	John Gunderson	Lightweight
(Canada)	John Makdessi	Lightweight
(United States)	John Salter	Middleweight
(United States)	Jonathan Brookins	Featherweight
(United States)	Josh Bryant	Middleweight
(United States)	Julio Paulino	Welterweight
(Czech Republic)	Karlos Vémola	Light Heavyweight
(United States)	Kris McCray	Welterweight
(England)	Curt Warburton	Lightweight
(Australia)	Kyle Noke	Middleweight
(United States)	Kyle Watson	Lightweight
(Brazil)	Maiquel Falcão	Middleweight
(Canada)	Mark Holst	Lightweight
(New Zealand)	Mark Hunt	Heavyweight
(England)	Mark Scanlon	Welterweight
(United States)	Michael Johnson	Lightweight
(United States)	Mike Guymon	Welterweight
(United States)	Mike Lullo	Lightweight
(United States)	Nam Phan	Featherweight
(United States)	Nick Pace	Bantamweight

ISO	Fighter	Division
(United States)	Pablo Garza	Featherweight
(Germany)	Pascal Krauss	Welterweight
(United States)	Pat Audinwood	Lightweight
(England)	Paul Sass	Lightweight
(United States)	Phil Davis	Light Heavyweight
(Brazil)	Rafael Natal	Middleweight
(Brazil)	Renzo Gracie	Light Heavyweight
(United States)	Ricardo Romero	Light Heavyweight
(United States)	Rich Attonito	Welterweight
(England)	Rob Broughton	Heavyweight
(Brazil)	Rolles Gracie Jr.	Heavyweight
(Brazil)	Ronys Torres	Lightweight
(Canada)	Rory MacDonald	Lightweight
(Armenia)	Sako Chivitchian	Lightweight
(United States)	Sean McCorkle	Heavyweight
(Canada)	Sean Pierson	Welterweight
(United States)	Seth Baczynski	Welterweight
(United States)	T.J. O'Brien	Lightweight
(United States)	TJ Waldburger	Welterweight
(Japan)	Takanori Gomi	Lightweight
(United States)	Todd Brown	Light Heavyweight
(United States)	Travis Browne	Heavyweight
(United States)	Tyler Toner	Featherweight
(Brazil)	Vinicius Queiroz	Heavyweight
(United States)	Waylon Lowe	Lightweight
(United States)	Will Campuzano	Bantamweight

== The Ultimate Fighter ==
Season	Finale	Division	Winner	Runner-up
TUF 11: Team Liddell vs. Team Ortiz	Jun 19, 2010	Middleweight	Court McGee	Kris McCray
TUF 12: Team GSP vs. Team Koscheck	Dec 4, 2010	Lightweight	Jonathan Brookins	Michael Johnson

== Title fights ==
Title fights in 2010
Weight class				Method	Round	Time	Event	Notes
Heavyweight	Shane Carwin	def.	Frank Mir	KO (punches)	1	3:48	UFC 111	(Note: For the interim UFC Heavyweight Championship.)
Welterweight	Georges St-Pierre (c)	def.	Dan Hardy	Decision (unanimous) (50–43, 50–44, 50–45)	5	5:00	UFC 111	(Note: For the UFC Welterweight Championship.)
Lightweight	Frankie Edgar	def.	B.J. Penn (c)	Decision (unanimous) (50–45, 48–47, 49–46)	5	5:00	UFC 112	(Note: For the UFC Lightweight Championship.)
Middleweight	Anderson Silva (c)	def.	Demian Maia	Decision (unanimous) (49–47, 48–47, 49–46)	5	5:00	UFC 112	(Note: For the UFC Middleweight Championship.)
Light Heavyweight	Maurício Rua	def.	Lyoto Machida (c)	KO (punches)	1	3:35	UFC 113	(Note: For the UFC Light Heavyweight Championship.)
Heavyweight	Brock Lesnar (c)	def.	Shane Carwin (ic)	Submission (arm-triangle choke)	2	2:19	UFC 116	(Note: For the UFC Heavyweight Championship.)
Middleweight	Anderson Silva (c)	def	Chael Sonnen	Submission (triangle armbar)	5	3:10	UFC 117	(Note: For the UFC Middleweight Championship.)
Lightweight	Frankie Edgar (c)	def	B.J. Penn	Decision (unanimous) (50–45, 50–45, 50–45)	5	5:00	UFC 118	(Note: For the UFC Lightweight Championship.)
Heavyweight	Cain Velasquez	def.	Brock Lesnar (c)	TKO (punches)	1	4:12	UFC 121	(Note: For the UFC Heavyweight Championship.)
Welterweight	Georges St-Pierre (c)	def.	Josh Koscheck	Decision (unanimous) (50–45, 50–45, 50–45)	5	5:00	UFC 124	(Note: For the UFC Welterweight Championship.)

== Events list ==
#	Event	Date	Venue	Location	Attendance
166	UFC 124: St-Pierre vs. Koscheck 2	Dec 11, 2010	Bell Centre	Montreal, Canada	23,152
165	The Ultimate Fighter: Team GSP vs. Team Koscheck Finale	Dec 4, 2010	Palms Casino Resort	Las Vegas, U.S.	1,903
164	UFC 123: Rampage vs. Machida	Nov 20, 2010	The Palace of Auburn Hills	Auburn Hills, Michigan, U.S.	16,404
163	UFC 122: Marquardt vs. Okami	Nov 13, 2010	König Pilsener Arena	Oberhausen, Germany	8,421
162	UFC 121: Lesnar vs. Velasquez	Oct 23, 2010	Honda Center	Anaheim, California, U.S.	14,856
161	UFC 120: Bisping vs. Akiyama	Oct 16, 2010	The O_{2} arena	London, England, U.K.	17,133
160	UFC 119: Mir vs. Cro Cop	Sep 25, 2010	Conseco Fieldhouse	Indianapolis, U.S.	15,811
159	UFC Fight Night: Marquardt vs. Palhares	Sep 15, 2010	Frank Erwin Center	Austin, Texas, U.S.	7,724
158	UFC 118: Edgar vs. Penn 2	Aug 28, 2010	TD Garden	Boston, U.S.	14,168
157	UFC 117: Silva vs. Sonnen	Aug 7, 2010	Oracle Arena	Oakland, California, U.S.	12,971
156	UFC Live: Jones vs. Matyushenko	Aug 1, 2010	San Diego Sports Arena	San Diego, U.S.	8,132
155	UFC 116: Lesnar vs. Carwin	Jul 3, 2010	MGM Grand Garden Arena	Las Vegas, U.S.	12,740
154	The Ultimate Fighter: Team Liddell vs. Team Ortiz Finale	Jun 19, 2010	Palms Casino Resort	Las Vegas, U.S.	1,708
153	UFC 115: Liddell vs. Franklin	Jun 12, 2010	General Motors Place	Vancouver, Canada	17,669
152	UFC 114: Rampage vs. Evans	May 29, 2010	MGM Grand Garden Arena	Las Vegas, U.S.	14,996
151	UFC 113: Machida vs. Shogun 2	May 8, 2010	Bell Centre	Montreal, Canada	17,647
150	UFC 112: Invincible	Apr 10, 2010	Yas Island	Abu Dhabi, United Arab Emirates	11,008
149	UFC Fight Night: Florian vs. Gomi	Mar 31, 2010	Bojangles' Coliseum	Charlotte, North Carolina, U.S.	7,700
148	UFC 111: St. Pierre vs. Hardy	Mar 27, 2010	Prudential Center	Newark, New Jersey, U.S.	17,000
147	UFC Live: Vera vs. Jones	Mar 21, 2010	1stBank Center	Broomfield, Colorado, U.S.	6,443
146	UFC 110: Nogueira vs. Velasquez	Feb 21, 2010	Acer Arena	Sydney, Australia	17,831
145	UFC 109: Relentless	Feb 6, 2010	Mandalay Bay Events Center	Las Vegas, U.S.	10,753
144	UFC Fight Night: Maynard vs. Diaz	Jan 11, 2010	Patriot Center	Fairfax, Virginia, U.S.	8,078
143	UFC 108: Evans vs. Silva	Jan 2, 2010	MGM Grand Garden Arena	Las Vegas, U.S.	13,529

== See also ==
- UFC
- List of UFC champions
- List of UFC events
