= UFC 167 =

UFC mixed martial arts event in 2013

UFC 167: St-Pierre vs. Hendricks
- The poster for UFC 167: St-Pierre vs. Hendricks
- Promotion: Ultimate Fighting Championship
- Date: November 16, 2013
- Venue: MGM Grand Garden Arena
- City: Las Vegas, Nevada
- Attendance: 14,856
- Total gate: $5,759,350
- Buyrate: 630,000

Event chronology
UFC Fight Night: Belfort vs. Henderson 2	UFC 167: St-Pierre vs. Hendricks	The Ultimate Fighter: Team Rousey vs. Team Tate Finale

UFC 167: St-Pierre vs. Hendricks was a mixed martial arts event held on November 16, 2013, at the MGM Grand Garden Arena in Las Vegas, Nevada, U.S.

== Background ==
The event commemorated the organization's 20th anniversary. The main event was a UFC Welterweight Championship bout between the champion Georges St-Pierre and #1 contender Johny Hendricks. Co-featured on the card was a light-heavyweight bout between Rashad Evans and Chael Sonnen.

Rafael Natal was briefly scheduled to face Ed Herman at the event. However, Natal was pulled from the pairing with Herman in favor of a bout with Tim Kennedy on November 6, 2013, in the event headliner at UFC Fight Night 31. Herman instead faced Thales Leites.

A bout between Frank Mir and Alistair Overeem was scheduled for this card, but was moved to UFC 169.

Robert Drysdale was initially scheduled to face Cody Donovan on this card. However, Drysdale was refused a fighting license by the Nevada State Athletic Commission (NSAC) after an out-of-competition drug test revealed that he had an elevated testosterone-to-epitestosterone ratio of 19.4. Donovan instead faced Gian Villante.

Vaughan Lee was expected to face Sergio Pettis at this event. However, Lee had to pull out citing an undisclosed injury and was replaced by Will Campuzano.

== Results ==
Main card
Weight class				Method	Round	Time	Notes
Welterweight	Georges St-Pierre (c)	def.	Johny Hendricks	Decision (split) (47–48, 48–47, 48–47)	5	5:00	(Note: For the UFC Welterweight Championship.)
Light Heavyweight	Rashad Evans	def.	Chael Sonnen	TKO (punches)	1	4:05
Welterweight	Robbie Lawler	def.	Rory MacDonald	Decision (split) (29–28, 28–29, 29–28)	3	5:00
Welterweight	Tyron Woodley	def.	Josh Koscheck	KO (punches)	1	4:38
Flyweight	Ali Bagautinov	def.	Tim Elliott	Decision (unanimous) (29–28, 29–28, 30–27)	3	5:00
Preliminary card (Fox Sports 1)
Lightweight	Donald Cerrone	def.	Evan Dunham	Submission (triangle choke)	2	3:49
Middleweight	Thales Leites	def.	Ed Herman	Decision (unanimous) (30–27, 30–27, 30–27)	3	5:00
Welterweight	Rick Story	def.	Brian Ebersole	Decision (unanimous) (30–27, 30–27, 30–27)	3	5:00
Bantamweight	Erik Pérez	def.	Edwin Figueroa	Decision (unanimous) (30–27, 30–27, 30–27)	3	5:00
Preliminary card (Facebook/YouTube)
Welterweight	Jason High	def.	Anthony Lapsley	Decision (unanimous) (29–28, 29–28, 29–28)	3	5:00
Bantamweight	Sergio Pettis	def.	Will Campuzano	Decision (unanimous) (30–27, 30–27, 29–28)	3	5:00
Light Heavyweight	Gian Villante	def.	Cody Donovan	TKO (punches)	2	1:22

== Bonus awards ==
The following fighters received $50,000 bonuses.

- Fight of The Night: Georges St-Pierre vs. Johny Hendricks
- Knockout of The Night: Tyron Woodley
- Submission of the Night: Donald Cerrone

== Reported payout ==
The following is the reported payout to the fighters as reported to the Nevada State Athletic Commission. It does not include sponsor money and also does not include the UFC's traditional "fight night" bonuses.

- Georges St-Pierre: $400,000 (no win bonus) def. Johny Hendricks: $50,000
- Rashad Evans: $250,000 (includes $125,000 win bonus) def. Chael Sonnen: $100,000
- Robbie Lawler: $166,000 (includes $83,000 win bonus) def. Rory MacDonald: $50,000
- Tyron Woodley: $104,000 (includes $52,000 win bonus) def. Josh Koscheck: $78,000
- Ali Bagautinov: $20,000 (includes $10,000 win bonus) def. Tim Elliott: $12,000
- Donald Cerrone: $96,000 (includes $48,000 win bonus) def. Evan Dunham: $25,000
- Thales Leites: $20,000 (includes $10,000 win bonus) def. Ed Herman: $40,000
- Rick Story: $54,000 (includes $27,000 win bonus) def. Brian Ebersole: $18,000
- Érik Pérez: $36,000 (includes $18,000 win bonus) def. Edwin Figueroa: $12,000
- Jason High: $30,000 (includes $15,000 win bonus) def. Anthony Lapsley: $8,000
- Sergio Pettis: $16,000 (includes $8,000 win bonus) def. Will Campuzano: $10,000
- Gian Villante: $38,000 (includes $19,000 win bonus) def. Cody Donovan: $8,000

== See also ==
- List of UFC events
- 2013 in UFC
