= Phil Davis (fighter) =

American mixed martial artist (born 1984)

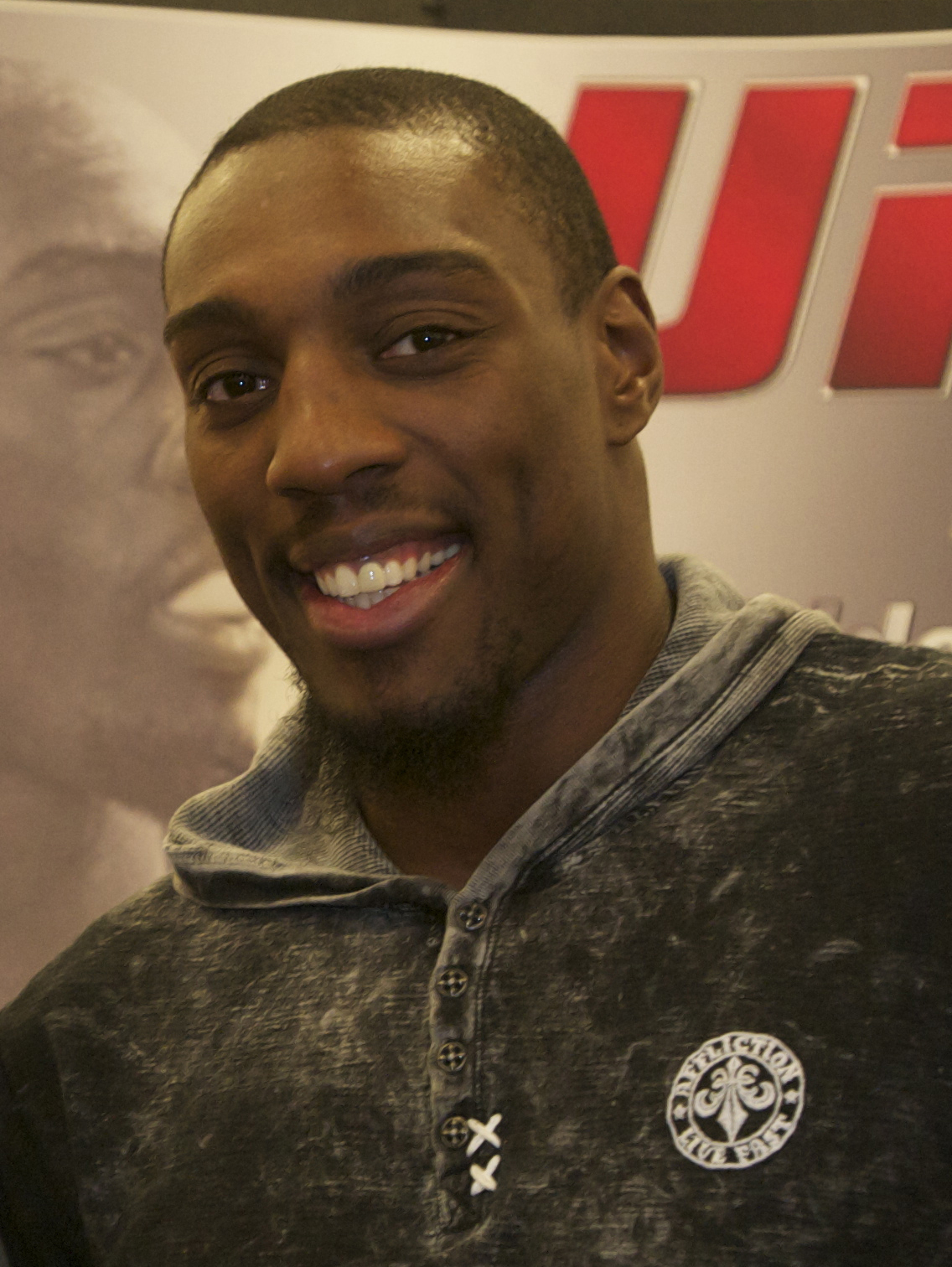
- Born: September 25, 1984 (age 42); Harrisburg, Pennsylvania, U.S.
- Other names: Mr. Wonderful
- Height: 6 ft 2 in (1.88 m)
- Weight: 205 lb (93 kg; 14 st 9 lb)
- Division: Light Heavyweight
- Reach: 79 in (201 cm)
- Style: Wrestling
- Stance: Orthodox
- Fighting out of: Chula Vista, California, U.S.
- Team: LionHeart MMA (2008–2009); Alliance MMA (2009–2024)
- Rank: Purple belt in Brazilian jiu-jitsu under Richie Martinez
- Wrestling: NCAA Division I Wrestling
- Years active: 2008–present (MMA)

Mixed martial arts record
- Total: 34
- Wins: 25
- By knockout: 7
- By submission: 5
- By decision: 13
- Losses: 8
- By decision: 8
- No contests: 1

Other information
- University: Penn State University
- Notable school: Harrisburg High School
- Mixed martial arts record from Sherdog
Medal record
Men's collegiate wrestling
Representing the Penn State Nittany Lions
NCAA Division I Championships
Gold medal – first place	2008 St. Louis	197 lb
Silver medal – second place	2006 Oklahoma City	197 lb
Big Ten Championships
Gold medal – first place	2006 Bloomington	197 lb
Gold medal – first place	2008 Park Ridge	197 lb

Phil Davis (born September 25, 1984) is an American mixed martial artist who currently competes as a Light Heavyweight division of the Professional Fighters League (PFL). Davis previously competed for Bellator MMA, where he is the former Bellator Light Heavyweight World Champion. Prior to signing with Bellator, Davis competed in the Ultimate Fighting Championship, where he achieved success as a top 5 Light Heavyweight contender and held a UFC record of 9–3 (1). Davis first gained athletic notoriety in college as a wrestler for Penn State University, where he became an NCAA Division I champion in 2008.

== Background ==
Davis was born and raised in Harrisburg, Pennsylvania, with his two older brothers, Jeffery and John. He began wrestling when he was in the seventh grade and then attended Harrisburg High School. As a high school wrestler, he was a four-year team captain and letterman, with a 112–17 career record, and a three-time PIAA class AAA state placer. Davis also lettered in tennis and cross-country running.

He then went on to wrestle for the Penn State Nittany Lions wrestling team, finishing in 5th place nationally in the 197 lb weight class as a junior in 2007 and then winning the 197 lb NCAA title in 2008. He finished with an overall wrestling record of 116–20 while at Penn State and was a four-time NCAA Division I All-American. After graduating from Penn State, he began training with the newly formed LionHeart MMA team in State College, Pennsylvania.

== Mixed martial arts career ==
Davis' primary training partners were Paul Bradley, Lou Armezzani and Jimy Hettes. He also trained with many visiting fighters such as Dave Herman, Shanon Slack, Dominick Cruz, Jon Jones and Cain Velasquez. When the LionHeart team disbanded in 2009, Davis moved to San Diego, California, to continue his training with Alliance MMA. Davis earned his blue belt in Brazilian Jiu-Jitsu under Lloyd Irvin in 2009. In 2009 he won the No Gi Grappling World Jiu-Jitsu Championship as a blue belt in the 221 lbs, Super Heavyweight division. Davis began his professional mixed martial arts career in 2008, compiling a record of 4–0 in regional promotions across the United States.

=== Ultimate Fighting Championship ===
Davis signed with the Ultimate Fighting Championship in December 2009.

==== First contender run ====
Davis made his UFC debut against Brian Stann on February 6, 2010, at UFC 109, winning by unanimous decision.

Davis faced Alexander Gustafsson on April 10, 2010, at UFC 112. Davis defeated Gustafsson via submission (anaconda choke) in the first round, giving Gustafsson his first loss.

Davis next faced Rodney Wallace on August 7, 2010, at UFC 117, replacing the injured Stanislav Nedkov. Davis controlled the bout with his wrestling and won by unanimous decision.

Davis fought Tim Boetsch on November 20, 2010, at UFC 123. He won by a one-handed modified kimura submission later dubbed the "Mr. Wonderful." He was awarded $80,000 for Submission of the Night and received the Submission of the Year award from MMANews247.com.

Davis was expected to face Matt Hamill in Toronto at UFC 129. However, Hamill was tapped as a replacement for Thiago Silva against Rampage Jackson at UFC 130. Davis was offered a fight against Jason Brilz, but then he replaced the injured Tito Ortiz on 6 weeks' notice against Antônio Rogério Nogueira in his first UFC main event on March 26, 2011, at UFC Fight Night 24. Davis defeated Nogueira by unanimous decision.

When UFC Light Heavyweight Champion Jon Jones pulled out of a long-awaited title fight for Rashad Evans, Phil Davis agreed to fight Evans on August 6, 2011, at UFC 133, but on July 12, Davis pulled out of the event with a knee injury and was replaced by Tito Ortiz. Davis was announced to face Lyoto Machida on December 10, 2011, at UFC 140, however, shortly after, it was revealed that Davis was still recovering from a knee injury and the fight did not occur.

Davis faced former UFC Light Heavyweight Champion Rashad Evans in a number one contender fight on January 28, 2012, at UFC on Fox 2. Despite Davis' substantial wrestling credentials, Evans dominated him on the canvas, coasting to a unanimous decision.

==== Second contender run ====
Davis was expected to face Chad Griggs on August 4, 2012, at UFC on FOX 4. However, Griggs was forced out of the bout with an injury and was replaced by promotional newcomer Wagner Prado. The fight was ruled "No Contest" after an accidental eye poke at 1:28 of round 1 rendered Prado unable to continue. A rematch with Prado, briefly linked to UFC on FX 5, took place on October 13, 2012, at UFC 153. Davis won the rematch with a second round anaconda choke submission.

Davis was expected to face Forrest Griffin on December 29, 2012, at UFC 155. However, in early December, Griffin pulled out of the bout, citing a knee injury. Davis faced Vinny Magalhães in a wrestler vs. BJJ specialist fight on April 27, 2013, at UFC 159. He won the fight by unanimous decision.

On August 3, 2013, at UFC 163, Davis won a controversial unanimous decision against former UFC Light Heavyweight Champion Lyoto Machida. Davis' only significant advantage was ground and pound following take-downs in the last minute of rounds one and two. While ESPN scored the fight for Davis, 13 selected UFC affiliate media outlets scored the fight in favor of Machida. An SP Nation fanpost stated, "Some MMA commentators and bloggers scored the fight 30–27 for Lyoto Machida." UFC president Dana White tweeted shortly after the fight that he had Machida winning all three rounds, and later told Yahoo! Sports "Machida definitely won", "MMA judging sucks", and his oft-repeated advice: "Never leave it in the hands of the judges." Machida left the light heavyweight division and went on to fight for the UFC Middleweight Championship.

With an official win over the highly ranked Machida, Davis looked to move into title contention against Anthony "Rumble" Johnson who returned to the UFC riding a six-fight win streak at light heavyweight (including one heavyweight fight) outside the promotion, following his disastrous and much-criticised previous UFC run at welterweight. Despite Davis being a considerable betting favorite, on April 26, 2014, in the co-main event at UFC 172, Johnson shut down Davis' wrestling game and kept the fight standing, where his pronounced edge in the striking won him all three rounds in a unanimous decision.

Leading up to the UFC 172 event, Davis actively baited UFC Light Heavyweight Champion Jon Jones on a media promotion conference call. Later, he disparaged Jones' achievements against undersized competition, claiming "against actual light heavyweights, he's been so-so". He predicted that he would soon claim the title, while explicitly dismissing the challenge of his own booked opponent Anthony Johnson. Jones, who defended the UFC Light Heavyweight title against Glover Teixeira at the same event, took pleasure in mocking Davis' loss at the post-fight press conference, and later on-line.

==== Final UFC fights ====
After UFC 172, Davis faced Glover Teixeira who was coming off a loss to UFC Light Heavyweight Champion Jon Jones on the same card. The fight took place October 25, 2014, at UFC 179. He utilized his wrestling advantage and won the fight by unanimous decision.

Having just one fight left of his UFC contract, Davis faced Ryan Bader on January 24, 2015, at UFC on Fox 14. He lost the fight by a close split decision. He did not re-sign with the UFC, finishing his UFC career with a record of 9–3 (1).

In May 2025, Davis filed a class action anti-trust lawsuit, alleges that the UFC's anticompetitive practices also negatively impacted the ability of non-UFC fighters to secure fair wages.

=== Bellator MMA ===
Following his final fight in the UFC, Davis parted from the organization and signed with Bellator MMA on April 15, 2015.

==== Road to the title ====
Davis made his debut as a participant in Bellator's one-night Light Heavyweight tournament at Bellator MMA & Glory: Dynamite 1 on September 19, 2015. He faced Emanuel Newton in the opening round and won by submission due to a kimura. He was scheduled to face Muhammed Lawal in the final. However, Lawal was unable to advance to the finals due to a rib injury and was replaced by alternate Francis Carmont. Davis won the bout via knockout in the first round.

By winning the tournament, Davis was set up to face Bellator Light Heavyweight Champion Liam McGeary at a yet-to-be-determined event. However, on February 19, 2016, it was announced that Davis next opponent would be Muhammed Lawal in a no 1 contender fight on May 14, 2016, at Bellator 154. He won the fight by unanimous decision.

Davis faced Liam McGeary for the Bellator Light Heavyweight Championship in the main event at Bellator 163 on November 4, 2016. He won the bout via unanimous decision to become the new Bellator Light Heavyweight champion.

==== Title and post-title reign ====
Davis faced his former opponent Ryan Bader again in a title fight on June 24, 2017, at Bellator 180. Bader and Davis first met at UFC on Fox: Gustafsson vs. Johnson on January 24, 2015, with Bader winning by split decision. He was defeated again via split decision, thus losing the Bellator title.

Davis faced undefeated Brazilian fighter Leo Leite on November 3, 2017, at Bellator 186. He won the fight via unanimous decision.

Davis faced Linton Vassell on May 25, 2018, at Bellator 200. He won the fight via knock out due to a head kick in round three.

Davis faced Vadim Nemkov on November 15, 2018, Bellator 209. He lost the fight via split decision.

Davis next faced Liam McGeary at Bellator 220 on April 27, 2019. He won the fight via TKO in the third round.

On August 15, 2019, it was announced that Davis had signed an exclusive multi-fight, multi-year contract extension with Bellator. In his first fight on that contract, Davis faced Karl Albrektsson at Bellator 231 on October 25, 2019. He won the fight via TKO in the third round.

Davis headlined Bellator 245 in a rematch against Lyoto Machida on September 11, 2020. He won the fight by split decision.

===== Bellator Light Heavyweight World Grand Prix =====
On February 9, 2021, it was announced that Davis would be participating in the Bellator Light Heavyweight World Grand Prix Tournament. Davis is scheduled to face Vadim Nemkov for the Bellator Light Heavyweight World Championship in the quarterfinal round. This was a rematch of their November 2018 bout, which saw Nemkov win via split decision. The bout took place at Bellator 257 on April 16. Davis lost the bout via unanimous decision, with Nemkov controlling the first three rounds on the feet.

===== Post Grand Prix =====
Davis faced Yoel Romero, who was making his Bellator debut, on September 18, 2021, at Bellator 266. He won the bout via split decision. Five out of five media outlets scored the fight for Davis.

Davis faced Julius Anglickas on March 12, 2022, at Bellator 276. He won the bout via unanimous decision.

Davis faced Corey Anderson on June 16, 2023, at Bellator 297. He lost the fight via split decision.

=== Professional Fighters League ===
Davis was expected to face Rob Wilkinson at PFL 2 on April 6, 2024. However, Davis withdrew from the bout due to an unknown reason and was replaced by Tom Breese.

On March 4, 2025, the promotion officially revealed that Davis will join the 2025 PFL Light Heavyweight Tournament.

In the quarterfinal, Davis faced Rob Wilkinson on May 1, 2025, at PFL 4. He won the fight by technical knockout in the second round.

In the semifinals, Davis faced Sullivan Cauley at PFL 7 on June 27, 2025. He lost the fight via unanimous decision.

== Championships and achievements ==
=== Amateur wrestling ===
- National Collegiate Athletic Association
  - NCAA Division I All-American out of Pennsylvania State University (2005, 2006, 2007, 2008)
  - NCAA Division I 197 lb – National Champion out of Pennsylvania State University (2008)
  - NCAA Division I 197 lb – National Runner-up out of Pennsylvania State University (2006)
- Pennsylvania Interscholastic Athletic Association
  - Pennsylvania AAA State Placer out of Harrisburg High School (2001, 2002, 2003)

=== Mixed martial arts ===
- Bellator MMA
  - Bellator Light Heavyweight World Championship (One time; former)
  - Bellator MMA Dynamite 1 Light Heavyweight Grand Prix Champion
  - Most wins in Bellator Light Heavyweight division (11)
  - Most bouts in Bellator Light Heavyweight division (16)
- Ultimate Fighting Championship
  - Submission of the Night (One time) vs. Tim Boetsch
  - UFC.com Awards
    - 2010: Newcomer of the Year & Ranked #9 Submission of the Year vs. Tim Boetsch
- MMA News 247
  - Submission of the Year (2010) vs Tim Boetsch on November 20, 2010

== Mixed martial arts record ==
Professional record breakdown
34 matches	25 wins	8 losses
By knockout	7	0
By submission	5	0
By decision	13	8
No contests	1	

Res.	Record	Opponent	Method	Event	Date	Round	Time	Location	Notes
Loss	25–8 (1)	Sullivan Cauley	Decision (unanimous)	PFL 7 (2025)	June 27, 2025	3	5:00	Chicago, Illinois, United States	2025 PFL Light Heavyweight Tournament Semifinal.
Win	25–7 (1)	Rob Wilkinson	TKO (punches)	PFL 4 (2025)	May 1, 2025	2	0:51	Orlando, Florida, United States	2025 PFL Light Heavyweight Tournament Quarterfinal.
Loss	24–7 (1)	Corey Anderson	Decision (split)	Bellator 297	June 16, 2023	3	5:00	Chicago, Illinois, United States	
Win	24–6 (1)	Julius Anglickas	Decision (unanimous)	Bellator 276	March 12, 2022	3	5:00	St. Louis, Missouri, United States	
Win	23–6 (1)	Yoel Romero	Decision (split)	Bellator 266	September 18, 2021	3	5:00	San Jose, California, United States	
Loss	22–6 (1)	Vadim Nemkov	Decision (unanimous)	Bellator 257	April 16, 2021	5	5:00	Uncasville, Connecticut, United States	Bellator Light Heavyweight World Grand Prix Quarterfinal. For the Bellator Light Heavyweight World Championship.
Win	22–5 (1)	Lyoto Machida	Decision (split)	Bellator 245	September 11, 2020	3	5:00	Uncasville, Connecticut, United States	
Win	21–5 (1)	Karl Albrektsson	TKO (punches)	Bellator 231	October 25, 2019	3	3:06	Uncasville, Connecticut, United States	
Win	20–5 (1)	Liam McGeary	TKO (jaw injury)	Bellator 220	April 27, 2019	3	4:11	San Jose, California, United States	
Loss	19–5 (1)	Vadim Nemkov	Decision (split)	Bellator 209	November 15, 2018	3	5:00	Tel Aviv, Israel	
Win	19–4 (1)	Linton Vassell	KO (head kick)	Bellator 200	May 25, 2018	3	1:05	London, England	
Win	18–4 (1)	Leonardo Leite	Decision (unanimous)	Bellator 186	November 3, 2017	3	5:00	University Park, Pennsylvania, United States	
Loss	17–4 (1)	Ryan Bader	Decision (split)	Bellator 180	June 24, 2017	5	5:00	New York City, New York, United States	Lost the Bellator Light Heavyweight World Championship.
Win	17–3 (1)	Liam McGeary	Decision (unanimous)	Bellator 163	November 4, 2016	5	5:00	Uncasville, Connecticut, United States	Won the Bellator Light Heavyweight World Championship.
Win	16–3 (1)	Muhammed Lawal	Decision (unanimous)	Bellator 154	May 14, 2016	3	5:00	San Jose, California, United States	Bellator Light Heavyweight world title eliminator.
Win	15–3 (1)	Francis Carmont	KO (punches)	Bellator 142: Dynamite 1	September 19, 2015	1	2:15	San Jose, California, United States	Won the Bellator Light Heavyweight Grand Prix.
Win	14–3 (1)	Emanuel Newton	Submission (kimura)	Bellator 142: Dynamite 1	September 19, 2015	1	4:39	San Jose, California, United States	Bellator Light Heavyweight Grand Prix Semifinal.
Loss	13–3 (1)	Ryan Bader	Decision (split)	UFC on Fox: Gustafsson vs. Johnson	January 24, 2015	3	5:00	Stockholm, Sweden	
Win	13–2 (1)	Glover Teixeira	Decision (unanimous)	UFC 179	October 25, 2014	3	5:00	Rio de Janeiro, Brazil	
Loss	12–2 (1)	Anthony Johnson	Decision (unanimous)	UFC 172	April 26, 2014	3	5:00	Baltimore, Maryland, United States	UFC Light Heavyweight title eliminator.
Win	12–1 (1)	Lyoto Machida	Decision (unanimous)	UFC 163	August 3, 2013	3	5:00	Rio de Janeiro, Brazil	
Win	11–1 (1)	Vinny Magalhães	Decision (unanimous)	UFC 159	April 27, 2013	3	5:00	Newark, New Jersey, United States	
Win	10–1 (1)	Wagner Prado	Submission (anaconda choke)	UFC 153	October 13, 2012	2	4:29	Rio de Janeiro, Brazil	
NC	9–1 (1)	Wagner Prado	NC (accidental eye poke)	UFC on Fox: Shogun vs. Vera	August 4, 2012	1	1:28	Los Angeles, California, United States	Accidental eye poke rendered Prado unable to continue.
Loss	9–1	Rashad Evans	Decision (unanimous)	UFC on Fox: Evans vs. Davis	January 28, 2012	5	5:00	Chicago, Illinois, United States	UFC Light Heavyweight title eliminator.
Win	9–0	Antônio Rogério Nogueira	Decision (unanimous)	UFC Fight Night: Nogueira vs. Davis	March 26, 2011	3	5:00	Seattle, Washington, United States	
Win	8–0	Tim Boetsch	Submission (modified kimura)	UFC 123	November 20, 2010	2	2:55	Auburn Hills, Michigan, United States	Submission of the Night.
Win	7–0	Rodney Wallace	Decision (unanimous)	UFC 117	August 7, 2010	3	5:00	Oakland, California, United States	
Win	6–0	Alexander Gustafsson	Submission (anaconda choke)	UFC 112	April 10, 2010	1	4:55	Abu Dhabi, United Arab Emirates	
Win	5–0	Brian Stann	Decision (unanimous)	UFC 109	February 6, 2010	3	5:00	Las Vegas, Nevada, United States	
Win	4–0	David Baggett	Submission (rear-naked choke)	Ultimate Cage FC 1	June 27, 2009	1	3:37	Pittsburgh, Pennsylvania, United States	
Win	3–0	Terry Cohens	TKO (punches)	Ultimate Warrior Challenge 6	April 25, 2009	1	4:29	Fairfax, Virginia, United States	
Win	2–0	Josh Green	TKO (punches)	Palace FC 12	January 22, 2009	1	1:49	Lemoore, California, United States	
Win	1–0	Brett Chism	Decision (unanimous)	No Boundary 1	October 11, 2008	2	5:00	Plymouth, Massachusetts, United States	

== NCAA record ==
NCAA Championships Matches
Res.	Record	Opponent	Score	Date	Event
2008 NCAA Championships (gold) at 197 lbs
Win	15–5	Wynn Michalak	7–2	March 22, 2008	2008 NCAA Division I Wrestling Championships
Win	14–5	Dallas Herbst	6–0	March 22, 2008	2008 NCAA Division I Wrestling Championships
Win	13–5	Hudson Taylor	7–3	March 22, 2008	2008 NCAA Division I Wrestling Championships
Win	12–5	Logan Brown	9–2	March 22, 2008	2008 NCAA Division I Wrestling Championships
Win	11–5	Riley Orozco	Fall	March 22, 2008	2008 NCAA Division I Wrestling Championships
2007 NCAA Championships 5th at 197 lbs
Loss	10–5	J.D Bergman	4–5	March 16, 2007	2007 NCAA Division I Wrestling Championships
Loss	10–4	Kurt Backes	4–5	March 16, 2007	2007 NCAA Division I Wrestling Championships
Win	10–3	Jerry Rinaldi	6–3	March 16, 2007	2007 NCAA Division I Wrestling Championships
Win	9–3	Travis Gardner	Fall	March 16, 2007	2007 NCAA Division I Wrestling Championships
Win	8–3	Ryan Goodman	9–3	March 16, 2007	2007 NCAA Division I Wrestling Championships
2006 NCAA Championships (silver) at 197 lbs
Loss	7–3	Jake Rosholt	3–10	March 18, 2006	2006 NCAA Division I Wrestling Championships
Win	7–2	Jerry Rinaldi	7–4	March 18, 2006	2006 NCAA Division I Wrestling Championships
Win	6–2	B.J Padden	6–5	March 18, 2006	2006 NCAA Division I Wrestling Championships
Win	5–2	Ryan Goodman	6–2	March 18, 2006	2006 NCAA Division I Wrestling Championships
Win	4–2	Jon Oplinger	11–0	March 18, 2006	2006 NCAA Division I Wrestling Championships
2005 NCAA Championships 7th at 197 lbs
Loss	3–2	Wynn Michalak	5–6	March 18, 2005	2005 NCAA Division I Wrestling Championships
Win	3–1	Chris Skretkowicz	12–6	March 18, 2005	2005 NCAA Division I Wrestling Championships
Loss	2–1	Jake Rosholt	4–9	March 18, 2005	2005 NCAA Division I Wrestling Championships
Win	2–0	Ryan Bader	3–1	March 18, 2005	2005 NCAA Division I Wrestling Championships
Win	1–0	Jerry Rinaldi	7–1	March 18, 2005	2005 NCAA Division I Wrestling Championships

== See also ==
- List of current Bellator fighters
- List of male mixed martial artists
