= The Ultimate Fighter: Team Liddell vs. Team Ortiz =

UFC mixed martial arts television series and event in 2010

- Genre: Reality, Sports
- Created by: Frank Fertitta III, Lorenzo Fertitta, Dana White
- Starring: Dana White; Chuck Liddell; Tito Ortiz; Rich Franklin (as of the final episode)
- Country of origin: United States

Production
- Running time: 60 minutes

Original release
- Network: Spike
- Release: March 31, 2010

The Ultimate Fighter: Team Liddell vs. Team Ortiz (also known as The Ultimate Fighter: Team Liddell vs. Team Franklin for the final episode of the season) is the eleventh installment of the Ultimate Fighting Championship (UFC)-produced reality television series The Ultimate Fighter. The show began taping in early 2010 and premiered on Spike on March 31, 2010. The live finale of the show was June 19, 2010.

The UFC and Spike TV held open tryouts on October 26, 2009, in Los Angeles, California. The casting call went out for middleweight and light heavyweight fighters. Fighters wanting to try out for the show must have been at least 21 years old and have had a professional MMA record. 300 fighters showed up to the tryouts including UFC veterans Jason Lambert, Nick Thompson and Logan Clark, International Fight League and EliteXC veteran Wayne Cole, as well as season 1 TUF competitor and former Strikeforce light heavyweight champion Bobby Southworth. In addition to the open tryouts, the UFC also accepted applications available through its website until November 9, 2009.

During The Ultimate Fighter: Heavyweights Finale, Dana White announced that the coaches would be Tito Ortiz and Chuck Liddell. White also announced that the fighters for this season would compete in the middleweight weight class. The season will feature 28 fighters as opposed to the usual 16 or 32. The series boasts a new "wildcard" format in which the two coaches will pick two fighters who lost their preliminary bouts to face each other for the eighth spot in the quarter-finals.

== Cast ==
=== Coaches ===
- Team Liddell
  - Chuck Liddell, head coach
  - Howard Davis, Jr., boxing coach
  - Scott Epstein
  - John Hackleman
  - Jake Shields
  - Antonio Banuelos
  Team Punishment
  - Tito Ortiz, head coach
  - Cleber Luciano
  - Rob McCullough
  - Saul Soliz

*In the final episode of the season, Tito Ortiz and his coaching staff are replaced by Rich Franklin and his team.

- Team Franklin
  - Rich Franklin, head coach
  - Forrest Griffin
  - Tyson Griffin
  - Gray Maynard

=== Fighters ===
- Team Ortiz

- Nick Ring, Kyacey Uscola, Kris McCray, Jamie Yager, James Hammortree, Clayton McKinney, Chris Camozzi (Seth Baczynski)*

- Team Liddell

- Kyle Noke, Rich Attonito, Charles Blanchard, Josh Bryant, Brad Tavares, Court McGee, Joseph Henle

* Camozzi was replaced by Baczynski due to injury before official competition started on national television

- Fighters eliminated before entry round

- Brent Cooper, Jacen Flynn, Charley Lynch, Victor O'Donnell, Norman Paraisy, Costas Philippou, Greg Rebello, Jordan Smith, Ben Stark, Lyle Steffens, Warren Thompson, Cleburn Walker, Woody Weatherby

== Episodes ==
Episode 1: Smashed Up

- Dana White welcomed 28 fighters to the "new and improved" UFC training facility and announced that only 14 would get into the Ultimate Fighter house.
- He also announced a format change for the season: following the first round, White and the coaches would pick two fighters who were eliminated in the first round to be wild cards. Those two wild card fighters would fight for another chance to go to the second round.
- The 28 fighters then fought to determine who would go to the Ultimate Fighter house. Elimination round matches were for two rounds. If there was a draw after two rounds, a third round would be fought.
- Jamie Yager defeated Ben Stark by KO (head kick) at 0:26 of the first round.
- Brad Tavares defeated Jordan Smith by KO (strikes) at 0:37 of the first round.
- Kris McCray defeated Cleburn Walker by TKO (shoulder injury) at 0:15 of the first round.
- James Hammortree defeated Norman Paraisy by TKO (retirement) at the end of the first round.
- Nick Ring defeated Woody Weatherby by TKO (punches) at 2:42 of the first round.
- Kyle Noke defeated Warren Thompson by unanimous decision (20–18, 20–18, 20–18) after two rounds.
- Court McGee defeated Seth Baczynski by unanimous decision (29–28, 29–28, 29–28) after three rounds.
- Chris Camozzi defeated Victor O'Donnell by unanimous decision (29–28, 29–28, 29–28) after three rounds.
- Kyacey Uscola defeated Brent Cooper by KO (punches) at 0:25 of the first round.
- Joseph Henle defeated Costas Philippou by submission (armbar) at 2:17 of the second round.
- Rich Attonito defeated Lyle Steffens by unanimous decision (20–18, 20–18, 20–18) after two rounds.
- Josh Bryant defeated Greg Rebello by majority decision (20–18, 19–19, 20–18) after two rounds.
- Charles Blanchard defeated Jacen Flynn by TKO (referee stoppage) at the end of the first round.
- Clayton McKinney defeated Charley Lynch by TKO (punches) at 4:07 of first round.

Episode 2: Suck it Up

- Chuck Liddell and Tito Ortiz picked teams. White flips a coin (blue for Liddell, red for Ortiz) to decide who got the first pick. Ortiz got to pick the first fighter, while Liddell got to pick the first fight.

Coach	1st Pick	2nd Pick	3rd Pick	4th Pick	5th Pick	6th Pick	7th Pick
Ortiz	Nick Ring	Kyacey Uscola	Kris McCray	Jamie Yager	James Hammortree	Clayton McKinney	Chris Camozzi
Liddell	Kyle Noke	Rich Attonito	Charles Blanchard	Josh Bryant	Brad Tavares	Court McGee	Joseph Henle

- White confronted Liddell about his team, believing that his picks were much weaker than Ortiz's due to a size and height difference between the two teams. He revealed that he and Ortiz often have different assessments about fighters.
- Team Liddell chooses Kyle Noke to fight Clayton McKinney.
- Tension heated up between Jamie Yager and McKinney as Yager, Brad Tavares and Kris McCray used blowhorns at 3:00 a.m. and woke the other fighters.
- McKinney thought his shoulder injury was a torn rotator cuff, leading Ortiz to believe McKinney was mentally weak and makes a point of pushing him harder. After an MRI, the doctor wrongly diagnoses the injury as just a bone contusion, therefore painful, but not serious.
- Kyle Noke defeated Clayton McKinney by submission (triangle choke) at 2:44 of the first round.
- A visibly frustrated McKinney walked away in disappointment, but was called back by Ortiz to immediately practice escaping triangle chokes. Attempting to boost the morale of McKinney and his team-mates, Ortiz reminded him that he could still win a wildcard slot.

Episode 3: A Lotta Heart

- White called out Chris Camozzi telling him that what he thought was just a minor tooth ache, was actually a broken jaw. Because of this injury, Camozzi was sent home and Seth Baczynski replaced him.
- Team Liddell chose Brad Tavares to fight James Hammortree.
- Tensions boiled between Jamie Yager and Nick Ring during the training session with Yager claiming that the Canadian was coming on strong with kicks. He then called Ring a bitch, angering him.
- Brad Tavares defeated James Hammortree by unanimous decision after three rounds.

Episode 4: Clown Box

- Nick Ring confronted Yager for cheering for his friend Brad Tavares during his fight with James Hammortree, despite Tavares being a member of the opposing team.
- Team Liddell chose Attonito to fight Uscola.
- Tensions rose when Uscola accused Yager of stealing his clothes.
- Rich Attonito defeated Kyacey Uscola by disqualification (illegal knee) at 3:36 of the first round.
- After a dominating first few minutes by Attonito, Uscola began to come back, but then appeared to land an illegal knee to the head of a grounded Attonito. A flattened out Attonito appeared to be unable to continue and was ruled the winner by disqualification.
- Immediately following the match debate ensued regarding the illegal knee, as post-fight replays and the interpretations of witnessing fighters and trainers resulted in the creation of a controversial decision.
- White admitted that there was controversy surrounding the decision, but stated that he felt the referee had made the correct decision. *After the fight, a frustrated Ortiz punched a door off of its hinges on his way out of the gym.
- Attonito returned to the house and broke the news that his hand was injured and may be broken.
- Team Liddell chose Blanchard to fight Yager.
- Jamie Yager defeated Charles Blanchard by TKO (strikes) at 1:09 of the first round.
- Team Ortiz gains control of the matchups.

Episode 5: If It Breathes, It Bleeds

- Wildcard predictions began by the fighters and James Hammortree stated his case, because of his "controversial" decision loss to Brad Tavares.
- It was revealed that the "bruised bone" Clayton McKinney was diagnosed with was actually a ripped off labrum ligament. While describing the surgery to his housemates, McKinney tells them that the doctor had to scrape the humeral bone, put screws in it, shave the ligament and then anchor the labrum to the humeral by using the screws. Since this type of injury takes 3–6 months to heal completely, it eliminated McKinney from the wildcard race, along with Charles Blanchard who claimed that he is in no condition to beat anybody right now.
- Ortiz made an apology to McKinney for making remarks about him not giving 100% during the earlier team training. McKinney accepted his apology but, as Ortiz walks away, gave him the middle finger.
- Team Ortiz chose McCray to fight Bryant.
- Josh Bryant defeated Kris McCray by unanimous decision after three rounds.
- Team Liddell regained control of the matchups.

Episode 6: Did Your Dizzle

- Kyacey Uscola expressed concern that Ortiz's training methods were "too rough," believing they caused Kris McCray's loss. His teammates, including McCray, thought otherwise.
- Team Liddell swept Team Ortiz in dodgeball to win the Coaches' Challenge.
- The blue team chose McGee to fight Ring.
- James Hammortree was sent to the hospital after being thrown by McCray and later revealed it may be a slipped disk.
- Nick Ring defeated Court McGee by majority decision after two rounds.
- Team Ortiz regains control of the matchups.
- Liddell disagreed with the decision and showed anger and disdain towards White and other people in attendance.

Episode 7: Coming for Blood

- Nick Ring expressed concern about a possible re-occurrence of a 3-year-old knee injury.
- Seth Baczynski defeated Joseph Henle via unanimous decision after three rounds.
- The wildcards were announced as Kyacey Uscola and Kris McCray.
- As Rich Attonito had to withdraw from the competition, his spot was open. White gave the slot to Court McGee, without having to fight for it.
- This upset Henle and James Hammortree who both believed they did enough in their fights to earn either a wildcard or Attonito's slot.

Episode 8: Closed Mouth Don't Get Fed

- Kris McCray defeated Kyacey Uscola via submission (keylock) at 0:59 of the second round.
- The quarter final matchups were announced as:

- Nick Ring vs. Court McGee
- Kyle Noke vs. Kris McCray
- Brad Tavares vs. Seth Baczynski
- Jamie Yager vs. Josh Bryant

- Ring discovers that he required his third ACL reconstruction surgery and faced the choice between fighting on and risking tearing his meniscus, or withdrawing from the competition.
- Ring withdrew and was replaced by Hammortree after he ran after White as he was leaving the house, stating he wanted the fight.
- Court McGee defeated James Hammortree via submission (standing guillotine choke) at 0:28 of the second round.

Episode 9: Civilized Sport

- Ortiz reveals that his doctors want him to have neck surgery immediately, as he is now regularly experiencing numbness in his limbs.
- Kris McCray defeated Kyle Noke via unanimous decision after three rounds.
- Brad Tavares defeated Seth Baczynski via disqualification (illegal soccer kick) at the end of the first round.
- Baczynski had soccer kicked Tavares in the head as the buzzer went signalling the end of the first round. The Team Liddell member then faceplanted, leading Baczynski to apologize immediately. Tavares then asked "for what?" clearly not knowing what had just happened.
- After consulting with the doctors, referee Herb Dean ended the fight, declaring Tavares the winner via disqualification, which marked the second time this season that such an event occurred.
- The decision sparks a near-riot after Ortiz and Saul Soliz claim that the soccer kick caught Tavares in the armpit. Soliz claims that Team Liddell already got one bad decision go their way, this angered Rich Attonito who called out Soliz for disrespecting him.
- After arguing with Joseph Henle about it, Ortiz proceeded to march towards him, leading Liddell to stand up for his fighter before being restrained by his team . It was later revealed by the replay that the kick landed solidly on the head.
- Liddell was pulled aside by White who informed him that Ortiz had pulled out of their intended fight at UFC 115. The episode ends with Liddell walking out of the room saying "I'm going to punch him."

Episode 10: Shocked and Awed

- Josh Bryant defeated Jamie Yager via TKO (retirement) at the end of the second round.
- After two rounds, the judges declared the fight a draw and the fight was to go to a third round. Yager complained about not being able to see and left the octagon in an ambulance with his neck stabilized as a precaution.
- No substantive injuries were found in the hospital examination, however, and he was discharged in a few hours.
- Ortiz is informed that he is being replaced as a coach. He at first leaves without explaining to the red team, leading White to have to inform them of his withdrawal. Ortiz then explains to his team a couple of hours later at the house.
- Liddell is upset at being denied his rematch with Ortiz and swears angrily.
- The semi-final matchups are announced as:

- Brad Tavares vs. Court McGee
- Kris McCray vs. Josh Bryant

- Rich Franklin, former UFC middleweight champion, replaced Ortiz as the red team's head coach.

Episode 11: A Will to Win

For this episode, the starting credits changed to reflect Ortiz' departure and Rich Franklin's entrance. The season was renamed "Team Liddell vs. Team Franklin." This was also a two-hour episode.

- Forrest Griffin, Tyson Griffin and Gray Maynard also come in as the assistant coaches.
- A number of fighters within the house decided to play a prank on Brad Tavares, Jamie Yager, Kris McCray and Kyle Noke in order to get revenge on a previous incident in which Tavares, Yager and McCray set off air horns in the middle of the night. This prank follows a similar structure to the original, in that it involves air horns during the early hours of the morning. This angers Tavares, who vows to get revenge.
- Court McGee defeated Brad Tavares via technical submission (rear naked choke) at 4:45 of the third round.
- White called the fighters to the gym where he introduces them to several members of the US Marines. The fighters spent the day training with the Marines before going back to the house and having a barbecue.
- Tavares and Yager made up a concoction of flour and beans which they began to throw out of their window at some of their housemates who were sunbathing. This eventually caused a heated confrontation between Yager and James Hammortree, followed by another confrontation between Yager and Kyacey Uscola. Yager insulted his teammate's fighting credentials and Uscola offered to fight him outside, to which Yager agreed. However, as Uscola stands outside waiting for Yager and calling him out through his window, his teammate simply shuts his window and remains in his room.
- Kris McCray defeated Josh Bryant via unanimous decision after three rounds.
- After the fight, Franklin jokes that he is the only undefeated coach in the history of TUF.
- McGee and McCray are announced as the season's finalists. Special mention was made of McCray setting the new record for fights per season, having fought five times ("literally every Tuesday" according to White).

== Tournament bracket ==
Preliminary round
Brad Tavares	UD
James Hammortree	3
Joseph Henle	3
Seth Baczynski	UD
Rich Attonito	DQ
Kyacey Uscola	1
Court McGee	2
Nick Ring	MD
Josh Bryant	UD
Kris McCray	3
Charles Blanchard	1
Jamie Yager	TKO
Kyle Noke	SUB
Clayton McKinney	1
Kris McCray	SUB
Kyacey Uscola	2

Quarter-finals
Brad Tavares	DQ
Seth Baczynski	1
Court McGee *	SUB
James Hammortree**	2
Josh Bryant	TKO
Jamie Yager	2
Kyle Noke	2
Kris McCray	UD

Semi-finals
Brad Tavares	3
Court McGee	SUB
Josh Bryant	3
Kris McCray	UD

Finale
Court McGee	SUB
Kris McCray	2

* Attonito was injured and replaced by McGee.

** Ring was injured and replaced by Hammortree.

Legend
	Team Liddell
	Team Ortiz/Franklin
UD	Unanimous decision
MD	Majority decision
SUB	Submission
(T) KO	(Technical) Knockout
DQ	Disqualification

== The Ultimate Fighter 11 Finale ==
The Ultimate Fighter: Team Liddell vs. Team Ortiz Finale
- The poster for The Ultimate Fighter: Team Liddell vs. Team Ortiz Finale
- Promotion: Ultimate Fighting Championship
- Date: June 19, 2010
- Venue: Palms Casino Resort
- City: Las Vegas, Nevada
- Attendance: 1,708
- Total gate: $430,000

Event chronology
UFC 115: Liddell vs. Franklin	The Ultimate Fighter: Team Liddell vs. Team Ortiz Finale	UFC 116: Lesnar vs. Carwin

The Ultimate Fighter: Team Liddell vs. Team Ortiz Finale (also known as The Ultimate Fighter 11 Finale) was a mixed martial arts event that was held by the Ultimate Fighting Championship (UFC) at the Palms Casino Resort in Las Vegas, Nevada, on June 19, 2010. Featured were the finalists from The Ultimate Fighter: Team Liddell vs. Team Ortiz in the Middleweight division.

=== Background ===
Kenny Florian filled in for Joe Rogan as color commentator, due to scheduling conflicts for Rogan.

Darren Elkins was scheduled to face Charles Oliveira at the event, but Oliveira reportedly had to pull out of the fight due to visa issues. The bout was moved to UFC Live: Jones vs. Matyushenko in August 2010.

== Results ==
Main Card
Weight class				Method	Round	Time	Notes
Middleweight	Court McGee	def.	Kris McCray	Submission (rear-naked choke)	2	3:41	(Note: TUF 11 Middleweight Tournament Final)
Light Heavyweight	Matt Hamill	def.	Keith Jardine	Decision (majority) (29–27, 29–27, 28–28)	3	5:00	(Note: Jardine had 1 point deducted in round 2 for a thumb to the eye.)
Middleweight	Chris Leben	def.	Aaron Simpson	TKO (punches)	2	4:17
Lightweight	Dennis Siver	def.	Spencer Fisher	Decision (unanimous) (30–27, 29–28, 29–28)	3	5:00
Middleweight	Rich Attonito	def.	Jamie Yager	TKO (punches)	2	4:25
Preliminary card
Lightweight	John Gunderson	def.	Mark Holst	Decision (unanimous) (30–27, 30–27, 30–27)	3	5:00
Middleweight	Brad Tavares	def.	Seth Baczynski	Decision (unanimous) (29–28, 29–28, 29–28)	3	5:00
Middleweight	Kyle Noke	def.	Josh Bryant	TKO (punches)	2	3:12
Middleweight	Chris Camozzi	def.	James Hammortree	Decision (unanimous) (29–28, 30–27, 30–27)	3	5:00
Heavyweight	Travis Browne	def.	James McSweeney	TKO (punches)	1	4:32	(Note: This bout aired on the broadcast following the Leben vs Simpson bout.)

=== Bonus awards ===
The following fighters received $25,000 bonuses.

- Fight of the Night: Matt Hamill vs. Keith Jardine
- Knockout of the Night: Chris Leben
- Submission of the Night: Court McGee

== Reported payout ==
The following is the reported payout to the fighters as reported to the Nevada State Athletic Commission. It does not include sponsor money or "locker room" bonuses often given by the UFC and also do not include the UFC's traditional "fight night" bonuses.

- Court McGee: $16,000 ($8,000 win bonus) def. Kris McCray ($8,000)
- Matt Hamill: $52,000 ($26,000 win bonus) def. Keith Jardine ($55,000)
- Chris Leben: $70,000 ($35,000 win bonus) def. Aaron Simpson ($13,000)
- Dennis Siver: $34,000 ($17,000 win bonus) def. Spencer Fisher ($26,000)
- Rich Attonito: $16,000 ($8,000 win bonus) def. Jamie Yager ($8,000)
- John Gunderson: $16,000 ($8,000 win bonus) def. Mark Holst ($6,000)
- Brad Tavares: $16,000 ($8,000 win bonus) def. Seth Baczynski ($8,000)
- Kyle Noke: $16,000 ($8,000 win bonus) def. Josh Bryant ($8,000)
- Chris Camozzi: $16,000 ($8,000 win bonus) def. James Hammortree ($8,000)
- Travis Browne: $12,000 ($6,000 win bonus) def. James McSweeney ($8,000)

== See also ==
- List of UFC champions
- List of UFC events
- 2010 in UFC

== See also ==
- The Ultimate Fighter
- List of current UFC fighters
- List of UFC events
- 2010 in UFC
