= UFC 112 =

UFC mixed martial arts event in 2010

UFC 112: Invincible
- The poster for UFC 112: Invincible
- Promotion: Ultimate Fighting Championship
- Date: April 10, 2010
- Venue: Concert Arena, Yas Island
- City: Abu Dhabi, United Arab Emirates
- Attendance: 11,008
- Total gate: $3,500,000
- Buyrate: 500,000

Event chronology
UFC Fight Night: Florian vs. Gomi	UFC 112: Invincible	UFC 113: Machida vs. Shogun 2

UFC 112: Invincible was a mixed martial arts event held by the Ultimate Fighting Championship on April 10, 2010, in Abu Dhabi, United Arab Emirates. Due to the time zone difference in Abu Dhabi, UFC 112 was shown live on pay-per-view in the United States at 1 pm ET (10 am PT), with a replay at the regular time of 10 pm ET (7 pm PT).

The event was the first held in the Middle East following the purchase of a 10 percent stake in the UFC parent company Zuffa by Abu Dhabi government-owned Flash Entertainment. It was also the first UFC event to be held outdoors in an open-air arena. The Concert Arena (at the Ferrari World theme park) was erected as a temporary venue for the event and was torn down the following week.

== Background ==
Vitor Belfort was expected to fight Anderson Silva for the Middleweight Championship; however, Belfort injured his shoulder during training and was unable to fight at the event. It was thought that Silva would instead take on Chael Sonnen, but he was unable to take the short notice fight due to lacerations obtained in a UFC 109 bout with Nate Marquardt. Silva ended up fighting Demian Maia.

A bout between Paul Taylor and John Gunderson was cancelled on the day of the fight because of health issues that Taylor faced after cutting weight.

== Results ==
Main Card
Weight class				Method	Round	Time	Notes
Middleweight	Anderson Silva (c)	def.	Demian Maia	Decision (unanimous) (50–45, 50–45, 49–46)	5	5:00	(Note: For the UFC Middleweight Championship.)
Lightweight	Frankie Edgar	def.	B.J. Penn (c)	Decision (unanimous) (50–45, 48–47, 49–46)	5	5:00	(Note: For the UFC Lightweight Championship.)
Welterweight	Matt Hughes	def.	Renzo Gracie	TKO (leg kicks and punches)	3	4:40
Lightweight	Rafael dos Anjos	def.	Terry Etim	Submission (armbar)	2	4:30
Middleweight	Mark Muñoz	def.	Kendall Grove	TKO (punches)	2	2:50
Preliminary card
Light Heavyweight	Phil Davis	def.	Alexander Gustafsson	Submission (anaconda choke)	1	4:55
Welterweight	Rick Story	def.	Nick Osipczak	Decision (split) (29–28, 29–28, 28–29)	3	5:00
Welterweight	DaMarques Johnson	def.	Brad Blackburn	TKO (body kick and punches)	3	2:08
Lightweight	Paul Kelly	def.	Matt Veach	Submission (guillotine choke)	2	3:41
Heavyweight	Jon Madsen	def.	Mostapha al-Turk	Decision (unanimous) (29–28, 29–28, 29–28)	3	5:00

== Bonus awards ==
The following fighters received $75,000 bonuses.

- Fight of the Night: Kendall Grove vs. Mark Munoz
- Knockout of the Night: DaMarques Johnson
- Submission of the Night: Rafael dos Anjos

== See also ==
- Ultimate Fighting Championship
- List of UFC champions
- List of UFC events
- 2010 in UFC
