= UFC 119 =

UFC mixed martial arts event in 2010

UFC 119: Mir vs. Cro Cop
- The poster for UFC 119: Mir vs. Cro Cop
- Promotion: Ultimate Fighting Championship
- Date: September 25, 2010
- Venue: Conseco Fieldhouse
- City: Indianapolis, Indiana
- Attendance: 15,811
- Total gate: $1,600,000
- Buyrate: 295,000

Event chronology
UFC Fight Night: Marquardt vs. Palhares	UFC 119: Mir vs. Cro Cop	UFC 120: Bisping vs. Akiyama

UFC 119: Mir vs. Cro Cop was a mixed martial arts event held by the Ultimate Fighting Championship on September 25, 2010, at Conseco Fieldhouse in Indianapolis, Indiana, United States. The event was the first that the UFC hosted in Indiana.

== Background ==
On August 15, 2010, Antônio Rodrigo Nogueira had to pull out of his bout with Frank Mir due to an injury that would require surgery. It later was reported to be a recurring hip injury. Mirko Cro Cop replaced Nogueira in the main event. The Mir/Nogueira bout was rescheduled and took place at UFC 140 in December 2011.

Aaron Riley was expected to face UFC newcomer Pat Audinwood at this event, but Riley was forced from the card with an injury and was replaced by Thiago Tavares.

UFC 119 featured preliminary fights live on Spike TV and ESPN UK.

== Results ==
Main card
Weight class				Method	Round	Time	Notes
Heavyweight	Frank Mir	def.	Mirko Cro Cop	KO (knee)	3	4:02
Light Heavyweight	Ryan Bader	def.	Antônio Rogério Nogueira	Decision (unanimous) (30–27, 30–27, 30–27)	3	5:00
Welterweight	Chris Lytle	def.	Matt Serra	Decision (unanimous) (30–27, 30–27, 30–27)	3	5:00
Lightweight	Sean Sherk	def.	Evan Dunham	Decision (split) (28–29, 29–28, 29–28)	3	5:00
Lightweight	Melvin Guillard	def.	Jeremy Stephens	Decision (split) (28–29, 29–28, 30–27)	3	5:00
Preliminary card (Spike TV)
Middleweight	C. B. Dollaway	def.	Joe Doerksen	Submission (guillotine choke)	1	2:13
Heavyweight	Matt Mitrione	def.	Joey Beltran	Decision (unanimous) (29–28, 29–28, 29–28)	3	5:00
Preliminary card
Lightweight	Thiago Tavares	def.	Pat Audinwood	Submission (guillotine choke)	1	3:47
Lightweight	Waylon Lowe	def.	Steve Lopez	Decision (split) (29–28, 28–29, 29–28)	3	5:00
Welterweight	T. J. Grant	def.	Julio Paulino	Decision (unanimous) (30–27, 30–27, 30–27)	3	5:00
Heavyweight	Sean McCorkle	def.	Mark Hunt	Submission (straight armbar)	1	1:03

== Bonus awards ==
The following fighters received $70,000 bonuses.

- Fight of the Night: Sean Sherk vs. Evan Dunham and Matt Mitrione vs. Joey Beltran
- Knockout of the Night: None awarded
- Submission of the Night: C. B. Dollaway

== See also ==
- Ultimate Fighting Championship
- List of UFC champions
- List of UFC events
- 2010 in UFC
