= UFC 205 =

UFC mixed martial arts event in 2016

UFC 205: Alvarez vs. McGregor
- The poster for UFC 205: Alvarez vs. McGregor
- Promotion: Ultimate Fighting Championship
- Date: November 12, 2016
- Venue: Madison Square Garden
- City: New York City, U.S.
- Attendance: 20,427
- Total gate: $17,700,000
- Buyrate: 1,300,000

Event chronology
The Ultimate Fighter Latin America 3 Finale: dos Anjos vs. Ferguson	UFC 205: Alvarez vs. McGregor	UFC Fight Night: Mousasi vs. Hall 2

UFC 205: Alvarez vs. McGregor was a mixed martial arts event promoted by the Ultimate Fighting Championship held on November 12, 2016, at Madison Square Garden in New York City, New York.

In what was described by UFC president Dana White as the "biggest fight card" in the company's history, Conor McGregor became the first fighter in the promotion's history to hold titles in two divisions simultaneously.

== Background ==
This event was the first UFC event hosted in New York City. It was also the first UFC event hosted in the state of New York after the longtime professional MMA ban was revoked in early 2016. To this point, UFC 7 was the only event contested in the state, taking place in September 1995 in Buffalo.

The UFC worked tirelessly to surpass the law that forbade professional mixed martial arts events in the state, including a drastic measure: they announced an event (UFC 197) for the Madison Square Garden, despite the ban still being in effect. However, it was announced that a preliminary injunction allowing the promotion to hold the event was denied by a federal judge. The event was eventually moved and contested in the promotion's home base of Las Vegas, Nevada.

=== Main card: three title bouts, including a champion vs. champion contest ===
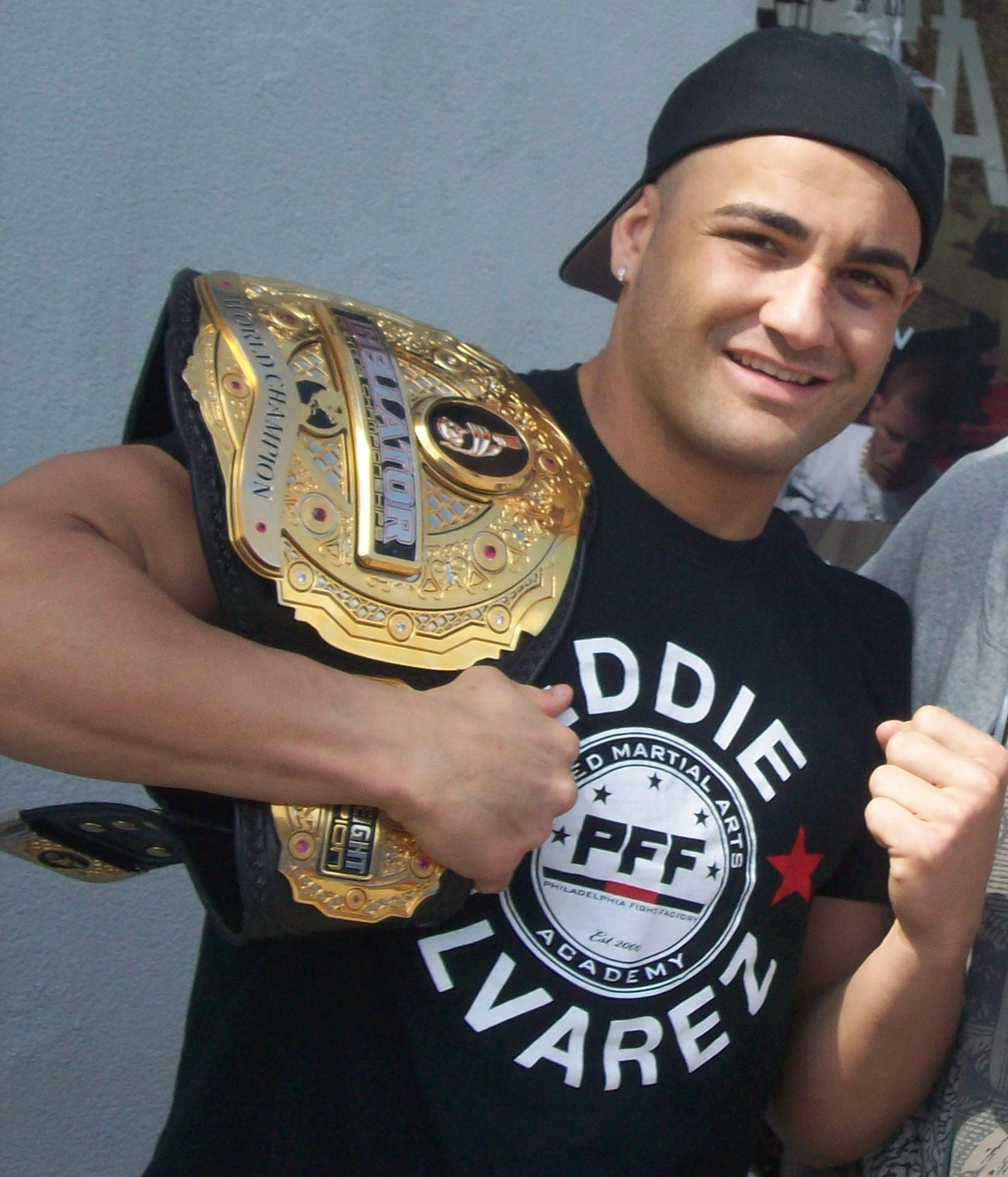
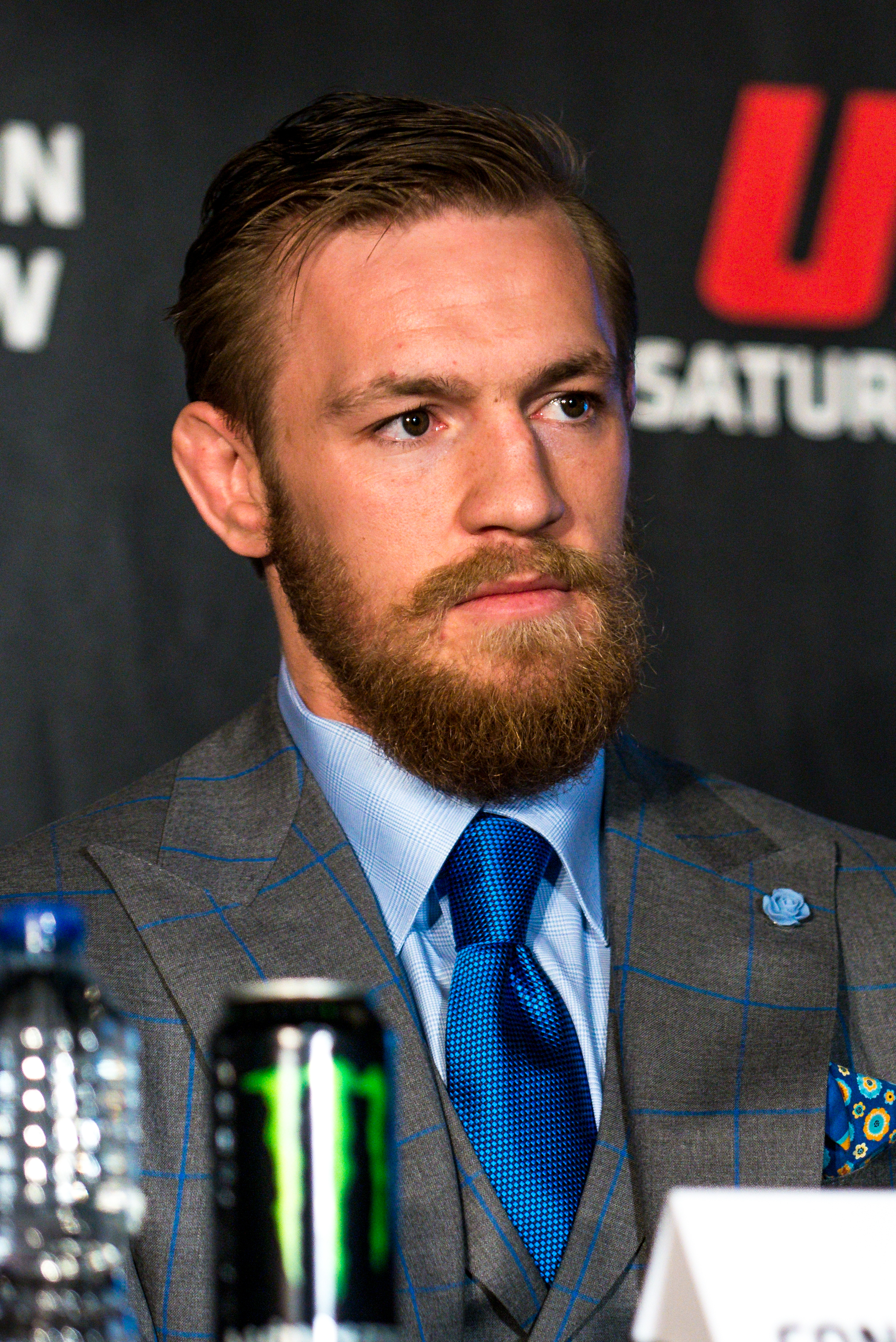
Alvarez (left) had his first title defense, while McGregor (right) has not defended his since winning it against José Aldo at UFC 194 in December 2015.

The event was headlined by a UFC Lightweight Championship bout between then champion Eddie Alvarez and UFC Featherweight Champion Conor McGregor. This was the second time in UFC history that champions in different divisions fought for the same title. The first time was at UFC 94 on January 31, 2009, when then-welterweight champion Georges St-Pierre defended his title against then-lightweight champion B.J. Penn.

Alvarez was originally expected to make his first title defense against undefeated contender Khabib Nurmagomedov, but it was announced on September 21 that Alvarez missed the contract deadline for the bout and in consequence it was expected to take place at UFC 206 in December. Meanwhile, McGregor was previously expected to challenge for the lightweight title at UFC 196 in February against then champion Rafael dos Anjos. Dos Anjos eventually pulled out due to a broken foot and the bout never materialized.

A UFC Welterweight Championship bout between the champion Tyron Woodley and five-time kickboxing world champion Stephen Thompson took place at the co-main event.

A third title fight, a UFC Women's Strawweight Championship bout between the champion Joanna Jędrzejczyk and Karolina Kowalkiewicz was also part of the card. The duo met previously in their amateur days in 2012, when Jędrzejczyk defeated Kowalkiewicz via submission in the Amatorska Liga MMA Tournament final.

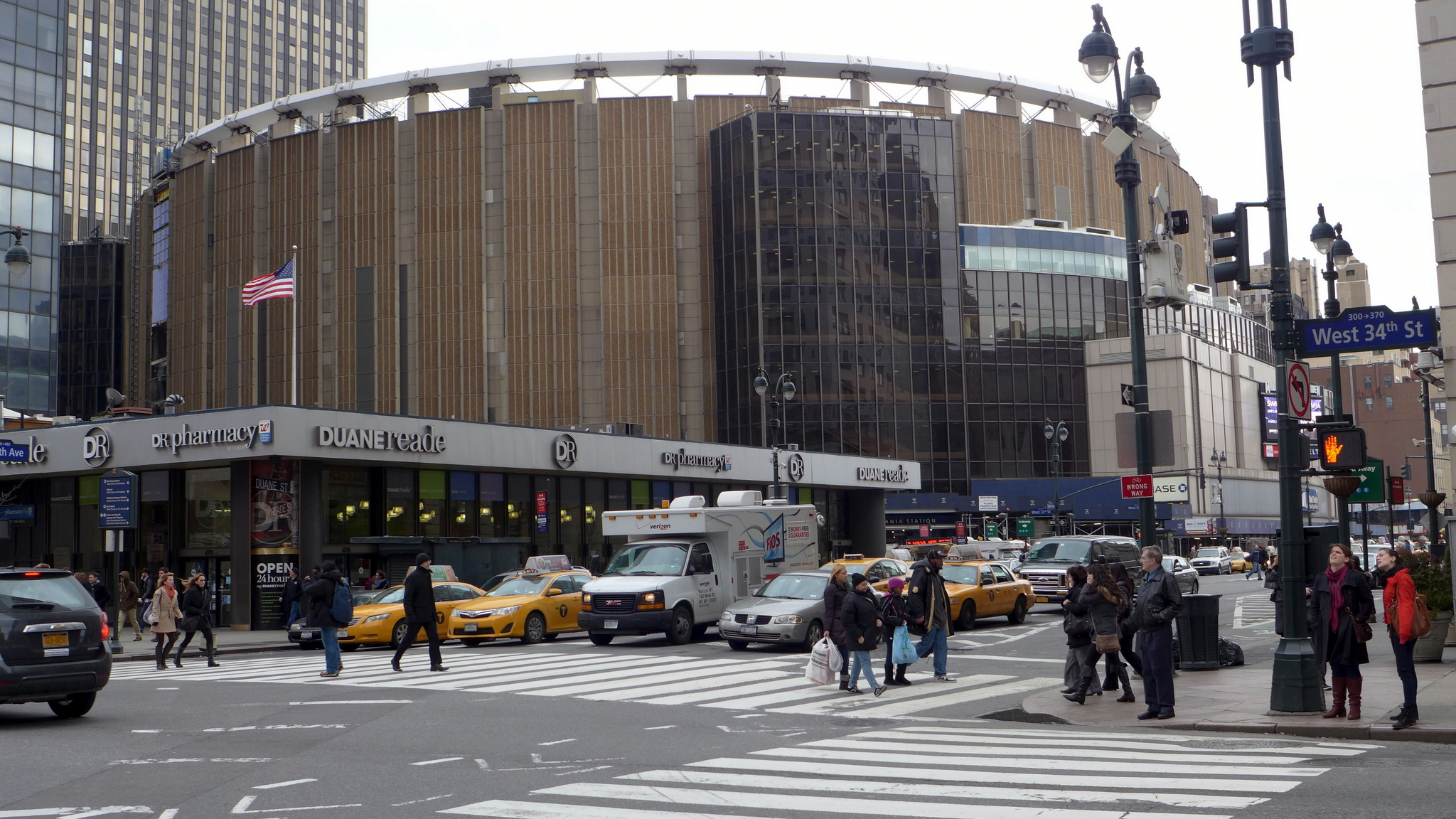
Madison Square Garden hosted the much anticipated New York City debut of the UFC.

A potential middleweight title eliminator between former UFC Middleweight Champion Chris Weidman and 2000 Olympic silver medalist and former world champion in freestyle wrestling Yoel Romero took place at this portion of the event.

A welterweight bout between former champion Robbie Lawler and former lightweight title challenger Donald Cerrone was the first confirmed bout of the event. However, just a few days after the announcement, it was revealed the Lawler decided to take a little more time to get ready for the fight after losing his title via knockout at UFC 201. He was replaced by The Ultimate Fighter: Team Jones vs. Team Sonnen middleweight winner Kelvin Gastelum, who was scheduled to face Jorge Masvidal one week earlier than the event.

Opening the main card was a women's bantamweight bout between former Strikeforce and UFC Women's Bantamweight Champion Miesha Tate and Raquel Pennington. Tate was Pennington's coach during The Ultimate Fighter: Team Rousey vs. Team Tate.

=== Preliminary card: a former champion and title challengers stack the under-card ===
A featherweight contest between former lightweight champion Frankie Edgar and Jeremy Stephens was the featured bout of the preliminary card. A few other bouts also took part of the Fox Sports 1 televised prelims:

- Despite being originally expected to face Alvarez, Khabib Nurmagomedov faced Michael Johnson instead in a potential lightweight title eliminator.
- A middleweight bout between Tim Boetsch and Rafael Natal.
- A welterweight bout between former Bellator Welterweight Champion Lyman Good and Belal Muhammad was scheduled for this portion of the event. However, on October 24, Good was pulled from the card after being notified by USADA due to a potential anti-doping violation stemming from an out-of-competition sample collected ten days earlier. He was replaced by Vicente Luque.

A lightweight bout between Al Iaquinta and former welterweight title challenger Thiago Alves was previously linked to UFC 202. However, the pairing was initially delayed and was expected to be contested at this event. Subsequently, Iaquinta announced on September 19 that he pulled out due to a contract dispute with the promotion. He was replaced by Jim Miller. The bout headlined the UFC Fight Pass portion of the event.

To complete the card, there was a women's bantamweight bout between former title challenger Liz Carmouche and Katlyn Chookagian.

A light heavyweight bout between Gian Villante and Marcos Rogério de Lima was briefly linked to the event. However, Villante pulled out of the fight on September 21 citing injury and the bout was scrapped.

A middleweight bout between Tim Kennedy and former UFC Light Heavyweight Champion and divisional newcomer Rashad Evans was scheduled for the FS1 portion of the event. However, on November 8, Evans was pulled from the fight after an undisclosed irregularity was found during his pre-fight medical exam. Subsequently, Kennedy was removed from the card as well.

=== Weigh-ins ===
At the weigh-ins, Alves was over his division weight limit by six pounds, weighing in at 162.6 lb. Per New York State Athletic Commission (NYSAC) rules, opposing lightweight fighters must weigh within 7 pounds of one another. Having not yet completed his own official weigh-in, Alves' opponent Jim Miller (who was within the designated lightweight limit) was able to rehydrate and officially weigh in over the limit himself, at 157.6 lb, allowing the bout to proceed as catchweight. NYSAC and UFC officials indicated that Alves must not weigh more than 173 lb the day of the fight, or it would be cancelled. As a result of missing the original designated weight, Alves was fined 20% of his purse, which went to his opponent.

Kelvin Gastelum did not appear for the official weigh-ins, announcing via Twitter that he would not fight Cerrone "on account that he couldn't make the weight limit". Prior to this announcement, Cerrone had already successfully weighed in at 170.4 lb, meaning he was unable to subsequently rehydrate as Miller did, to keep within 7 pounds of his over-weight opponent. In an interview after hearing the news, Cerrone stated he would have "blown weight too," had Gastelum informed him prior. As a result, Gastelum was pulled from the card and UFC president Dana White stated he will never let him fight at welterweight in the organization again, and that he believes Gastelum missed weight by 10 pounds. Despite the one-day notice, it was reported a small number of fighters were interested in filling in to fight Cerrone. According to one candidate Alan Jouban, UFC matchmaker Joe Silva was interested in having him fill in, however, according to Jouban, the NYSAC would not consider sanctioning any fighters on such short notice.

Consequently, the bout was scrapped. Cerrone was quickly rescheduled and faced Matt Brown the following month at UFC 206.

== Results ==
Main Card
Weight class				Method	Round	Time	Notes
Lightweight	Conor McGregor	def.	Eddie Alvarez (c)	TKO (punches)	2	3:04	(Note: For the UFC Lightweight Championship.)
Welterweight	Tyron Woodley (c)	vs.	Stephen Thompson	Draw (majority) (47–47, 47–47, 48–47)	5	5:00	(Note: For the UFC Welterweight Championship.)
Women's Strawweight	Joanna Jędrzejczyk (c)	def.	Karolina Kowalkiewicz	Decision (unanimous) (49–46, 49–46, 49–46)	5	5:00	(Note: For the UFC Women's Strawweight Championship.)
Middleweight	Yoel Romero	def.	Chris Weidman	KO (flying knee and punches)	3	0:24
Women's Bantamweight	Raquel Pennington	def.	Miesha Tate	Decision (unanimous) (29–28, 30–27, 30–27)	3	5:00
Preliminary Card (Fox Sports 1)
Featherweight	Frankie Edgar	def.	Jeremy Stephens	Decision (unanimous) (29-28, 30-27, 30-27)	3	5:00
Lightweight	Khabib Nurmagomedov	def.	Michael Johnson	Submission (kimura)	3	2:31
Middleweight	Tim Boetsch	def.	Rafael Natal	TKO (punches)	1	3:22
Welterweight	Vicente Luque	def.	Belal Muhammad	KO (punches)	1	1:19
Preliminary Card (UFC Fight Pass)
Catchweight (162.6 lb)	Jim Miller	def.	Thiago Alves	Decision (unanimous) (30–27, 29–28, 30–27)	3	5:00
Women's Bantamweight	Liz Carmouche	def.	Katlyn Chookagian	Decision (split) (28–29, 29–28, 29–28)	3	5:00

== Bonus awards ==
The following fighters were awarded $50,000 bonuses:

- Fight of the Night: Tyron Woodley vs. Stephen Thompson
- Performance of the Night: Conor McGregor and Yoel Romero

== Records set ==
The ceremonial weigh-ins set an attendance record of 15,480 spectators. The event reportedly generated $17,700,000 in gate receipts, which broke the UFC 129 record for a mixed martial arts event, as well as the record for the venue, Madison Square Garden. The attendance of 20,427 was the highest for a domestic event. These records have since been surpassed by UFC 306 on September 14, 2024 which generated $21,829,245 and UFC 281 on November 12, 2022 which had 20,845 people in attendance.

The pre-fight documentary Fighting for History drew 2.4 million viewers on Fox, the most of any preview show in UFC history.

The Reebok athlete outfitting pay was the highest in history, with a total of $392,500.

With his win, McGregor became the first fighter in the promotion's history to hold two titles simultaneously.

== Aftermath ==
On November 21, the NYSAC administratively suspended Gastelum for six months because he did not attend the weigh-ins. An administrative suspension is different from a typical commission suspension in that it does not have to be reciprocated by other jurisdictions. Despite being originally expected to value only in New York, it was announced two days later that the suspension was added to the database of the Association of Boxing Commissions (ABC) and it could be extend to other jurisdictions as well. Gastelum's team announced they would enter an appeal. Gastelum was cleared of his suspension on November 30, which allowed him to face Kennedy at UFC 206, as Evans once again was pulled from the bout.

The NYSAC also issued a three-month suspension for Alves due to him missing weight, as well as a two-month suspension for Romero for leaving cage right after defeating Weidman. Romero jumped over the Octagon in adulation, did a soldier's march around the outside perimeter of the cage, and then entered back in for the official results.

On November 26, due to his inactivity in the featherweight division, McGregor was stripped of the UFC Featherweight Championship, therefore promoting José Aldo to undisputed champion.

On April 1, 2017, it was announced that Good will receive a six-month suspension from USADA retroactive to his positive test. "USADA found that Lyman's October 2016 flagged urine specimen was the result of tainted vitamins and not the result of any intentional violation", Good’s lawyer David Fish said.

== See also ==
- List of UFC events
- 2016 in UFC
