= TJ Waldburger =

American mixed martial arts fighter

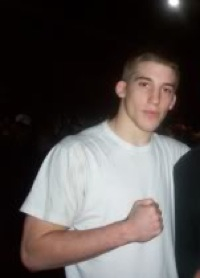
- Born: Anthony Waldburger Jr. April 25, 1988 (age 38); Temple, Texas, U.S.
- Height: 5 ft 11 in (1.80 m)
- Weight: 170 lb (77 kg; 12 st)
- Division: Welterweight
- Reach: 75 in (190 cm)
- Fighting out of: Temple, Texas, U.S.
- Team: Grapplers Lair
- Rank: Black belt in Brazilian Jiu-Jitsu
- Years active: 2005–2014

Mixed martial arts record
- Total: 25
- Wins: 16
- By knockout: 1
- By submission: 13
- By decision: 2
- Losses: 9
- By knockout: 7
- By decision: 2
- Draws: 0

Other information
- Mixed martial arts record from Sherdog

Anthony "TJ" Waldburger Jr. (born April 25, 1988) is an American retired mixed martial artist who competed in the Welterweight division. A professional MMA competitor since 2005, he competed for the UFC, Shark Fights, and HDNet Fights.

== Background ==
Waldburger went to Belton High School (Texas).

== Mixed martial arts career ==
=== Early career ===
He held an amateur record of 3-0 before turning professional at the age of 17. He lost his professional debut against Sammy Say but defeated him in his next bout to move to 1-1.

At the event, IFC: Road to Global Domination, he lost to Josh Neer but rebounded with a win over Jeff Lindsay. Waldburger defeated UFC veteran Pete Spratt via triangle choke submission in the second round. Spratt demanded a rematch and got one defeating Waldburger via knockout. He lost another fight before winning three straight. His early accomplishments include winning the Shark Fights Welterweight Championship belt in May 2009 and then defending it in September 2009.

=== Ultimate Fighting Championship ===
In July 2010 it was announced Waldburger had signed with the UFC. His debut came at UFC Fight Night 22 against David Mitchell. He won the fight via unanimous decision.

Waldburger was expected to face Matthew Riddle on December 11, 2010 at UFC 124. However, Waldburger was forced from the card with an injury.

Waldburger was expected to face Dennis Hallman on March 26, 2011 at UFC Fight Night 24. However, Hallman was forced out of the bout with an injury and replaced by Johny Hendricks. Waldburger was defeated early in round one via TKO.

Waldburger was expected to face Daniel Roberts on September 17, 2011 at UFC Fight Night 25. However, Roberts was forced out of the bout with an injury and replaced by promotional newcomer Mike Stumpf. Waldburger defeated Stumpf via first round triangle choke submission earning Submission of the Night honors.

Waldburger next faced Jake Hecht on March 3, 2012 at UFC on FX 2. He won the fight via submission in the first round.

Waldburger faced Brian Ebersole on June 22, 2012 at UFC on FX 4. He lost the back-and-forth fight via unanimous decision.

Waldburger faced Nick Catone on December 15, 2012 at The Ultimate Fighter: Team Carwin vs. Team Nelson Finale. He won the fight via technical submission in the second round. He earned the Submission of the Night honors for his performance.

Waldburger was expected to face Sean Pierson on June 15, 2013 at UFC 161. However, Waldburger was pulled from the event and replaced by Kenny Robertson.

Waldburger faced Adlan Amagov on October 19, 2013 at UFC 166. He lost the fight by knockout in the first round.

Waldburger faced Mike Pyle on February 22, 2014 at UFC 170. He lost the fight via TKO in the third round.

Waldburger was expected to face Wendell Oliveira on February 22, 2015 at UFC Fight Night 61. However, the fight was cancelled on the day of the weigh ins, as Waldburger passed out while cutting weight. Both fighters were paid their show money.

The bout with Oliveira was rescheduled for May 30, 2015 at UFC Fight Night 67. However, it was scrapped yet again after Waldburger pulled out of the bout on May 19 due to undisclosed reasons. He was replaced by promotional newcomer Darren Till. In turn, Waldburger was released from the promotion.

== Personal life ==
Waldburger is married to Shayla Moore who is the daughter of his coach, John Moore of the Grappler's Lair gym. They have two sons and one daughter as of 2017.

== Championships and accomplishments ==
- Ultimate Fighting Championship
  - Submission of the Night (Two times) vs. Mike Stumpf & Nick Catone
  - UFC.com Awards
    - 2012: Ranked #5 Submission of the Year vs. Nick Catone
- Shark Fights
  - Shark Fights Welterweight Championship (One time)
  - One successful championship defense

== Mixed martial arts record ==
Professional record breakdown
25 matches	16 wins	9 losses
By knockout	1	7
By submission	13	0
By decision	2	2

Res.	Record	Opponent	Method	Event	Date	Round	Time	Location	Notes
Loss	16–9	Mike Pyle	TKO (elbows and punches)	UFC 170	February 22, 2014	3	4:03	Las Vegas, Nevada, United States	
Loss	16–8	Adlan Amagov	KO (punches)	UFC 166	October 19, 2013	1	3:00	Houston, Texas, United States	
Win	16–7	Nick Catone	Technical Submission (triangle choke)	The Ultimate Fighter 16 Finale	December 15, 2012	2	1:04	Las Vegas, Nevada, United States	Submission of the Night.
Loss	15–7	Brian Ebersole	Decision (unanimous)	UFC on FX: Maynard vs. Guida	June 22, 2012	3	5:00	Atlantic City, New Jersey, United States	
Win	15–6	Jake Hecht	Submission (armbar)	UFC on FX: Alves vs. Kampmann	March 3, 2012	1	0:55	Sydney, Australia	
Win	14–6	Mike Stumpf	Submission (triangle choke)	UFC Fight Night: Shields vs. Ellenberger	September 17, 2011	1	3:52	New Orleans, Louisiana, United States	Submission of the Night.
Loss	13–6	Johny Hendricks	TKO (punches)	UFC Fight Night: Nogueira vs. Davis	March 26, 2011	1	1:35	Seattle, Washington, United States	
Win	13–5	David Mitchell	Decision (unanimous)	UFC Fight Night: Marquardt vs. Palhares	September 15, 2010	3	5:00	Austin, Texas, United States	
Win	12–5	Pat Healy	Decision (unanimous)	Shark Fights 6: Stars & Stripes	September 12, 2009	3	5:00	Amarillo, Texas, United States	Defended Shark Fights Welterweight Championship.
Win	11–5	Shannon Ritch	Submission (armbar)	Shark Fights 4: Richards vs Schoonover	May 2, 2009	1	1:37	Lubbock, Texas, United States	Won Shark Fights Welterweight Championship.
Win	10–5	Andrew Chappelle	TKO (doctor stoppage)	SWC 3: St. Valentine's Day Massacre	February 21, 2009	1	3:00	Frisco, Texas, United States	
Loss	9–5	Ricardo Funch	TKO (punches)	Xtreme Fighting Championship	June 14, 2008	2	2:35	Austin, Texas, United States	
Loss	9–4	Pete Spratt	KO (punches)	HDNet Fights 1	October 13, 2007	1	1:29	Dallas, Texas, United States	
Win	9–3	Pete Spratt	Submission (triangle choke)	King of Kombat	September 7, 2007	2	1:30	Austin, Texas, United States	
Win	8–3	Jeff Lindsay	Submission	Masters of the Cage 14	June 23, 2007	1	1:27	Oklahoma City, Oklahoma, United States	
Loss	7–3	Josh Neer	TKO (punches)	IFC: Road to Global Domination	March 4, 2007	1	0:24	Belton, Texas, United States	
Win	7–2	Jeff Lindsay	Submission (triangle choke)	Masters of the Cage 7	December 2, 2006	1	2:43	Norman, Oklahoma, United States	
Win	6–2	Brian Foster	Submission (armbar)	Masters of the Cage 4	September 23, 2006	1	0:29	Oklahoma City, Oklahoma, United States	
Win	5–2	Barry Peoples	Submission (achilles lock)	DPP: September to Remember	September 17, 2006	1	0:15	Lafayette, Louisiana, United States	
Win	4–2	Jeremiah O'Neal	Submission (armbar)	Xtreme Fighting Championship VII	September 17, 2006	1	4:23	Austin, Texas, United States	
Win	3–2	Brandon Berkey	Submission	Ultimate Texas Showdown 6	June 24, 2006	1	1:22	Frisco, Texas, United States	
Loss	2–2	Todd Moore	Decision (unanimous)	Renegades Extreme Fighting	March 25, 2006	3	5:00	Houston, Texas, United States	
Win	2–1	Nathan Fussel	Submission (rear-naked choke)	Xtreme Fighting Championship 5	February 18, 2006	1	1:50	Austin, Texas, United States	
Win	1–1	Sammy Say	Submission (triangle choke)	Renegades Extreme Fighting	February 10, 2006	1	1:57	Austin, Texas, United States	
Loss	0–1	Sammy Say	TKO (punches)	Ultimate Texas Showdown 3	November 26, 2005	1	1:18	Dallas, Texas, United States	

== See also ==
- List of male mixed martial artists
