= Rafael Natal =

Brazilian mixed martial arts fighter

- Born: December 25, 1982 (age 43); Belo Horizonte, Minas Gerais, Brazil
- Other names: Sapo
- Height: 6 ft 0 in (1.83 m)
- Weight: 185 lb (84 kg; 13.2 st)
- Division: Middleweight
- Reach: 76 in (193 cm)
- Stance: Orthodox
- Fighting out of: New York City, New York, U.S.
- Team: Renzo Gracie Academy
- Rank: Black belt in Brazilian Jiu-Jitsu under Vinicius "Draculino" Magalhães and Renzo Gracie
- Years active: 2005–2017

Mixed martial arts record
- Total: 31
- Wins: 21
- By knockout: 4
- By submission: 8
- By decision: 9
- Losses: 9
- By knockout: 6
- By decision: 3
- Draws: 1

Other information
- Website: www.rafaelsapo.com
- Mixed martial arts record from Sherdog

Rafael Natal Diniz Franca (Brazilian Portuguese: [ʁafaˈɛw naˈtaw]; born December 25, 1982) is a Brazilian former mixed martial artist. A professional from 2005 until 2017, he is best known for his 17-fight stint competing for the UFC.

== Mixed martial arts career ==
=== Background ===
Natal started Brazilian Jiu-Jitsu and was eventually awarded his black belt by fifth degree black belt Vinicius Magalhães. Natal is also a professor (an instructor) at Renzo Gracie's academy in New York, where he trains with Márcio Cruz.

Natal's professional MMA career began in smaller shows and he compiled a record of 6–0 - which included a victory over Danillo Villefort - before scoring a minor upset victory over Silmar Rodrigo via unanimous decision.

=== Ring of Combat and Moosin ===
Natal then joined Ring of Combat and made his promotional debut against Alexandre Moreno at Ring of Combat 23. Natal defeated him via KO in the first round.

This was followed up by a submission win over Plinio Cruz at Ring of Combat 24, before Natal faced Victor O'Donnell at Ring of Combat 25. Natal lost to O'Donnell via doctor stoppage after round 1.

At Ring of Combat 26, Natal was supposed to fight Sean Salmon. However, Salmon had to withdraw and was replaced by Allan Weickert. Weickert was no match for Natal, who picked up the submission victory after a rear naked choke.

Natal then competed in Moosin: God of Martial Arts against The Ultimate Fighter 4 winner Travis Lutter. In a bout dominated by striking, Natal caught Lutter with an uppercut, giving him the KO victory in the first round.

=== Ultimate Fighting Championship ===
Natal then reportedly signed a deal with Shine Fights. However, in July 2010, Renzo Gracie announced on his website that Natal had instead signed a four-fight deal with the UFC.

His first opponent was The Ultimate Fighter alumn Rich Attonito at UFC Fight Night: Marquardt vs. Palhares. Natal lost the bout via unanimous decision. Natal was dropped in the first round in the bout with Attonito. He recovered well and even got takedowns but couldn't do enough to win the decision.

Natal was expected to face Jason MacDonald on December 11, 2010 at UFC 124. However, MacDonald would later withdraw and was replaced by newcomer Jesse Bongfeldt. The fight was scored a draw by the judges. Natal won the first two rounds 10–9, but two judges scored the third round 10–8 Bongfeldt leading to the majority draw (two 28–28 scores) after 3 rounds. The scorecards were originally announced as a unanimous 30–30 draw, but when copies of the scorecards were distributed, the mistake was corrected.

Natal was expected to face Alessio Sakara on March 3, 2011 at UFC Live: Sanchez vs. Kampmann but due to injury Natal was replaced by Chris Weidman.

Natal was expected to face Riki Fukuda on August 6, 2011 at UFC 133. However, Fukuda was forced out of the bout due to a knee injury sustained in a car accident and replaced by Costas Philippou. When Philippou replaced an injured Alessio Sakara to fight Jorge Rivera, Natal faced former The Ultimate Fighter: Team Rampage vs. Team Forrest competitor Paul Bradley instead. Natal defeated Bradley by unanimous decision, winning the first and third rounds on all three judges scorecards. In the fight Natal utilized excellent takedown defense and a constant barrage of low kicks to outpoint his opponent.

Natal faced UFC newcomer Michael Kuiper on February 4, 2012 at UFC 143. He won the fight via unanimous decision.

Natal next face Andrew Craig on July 11, 2012 at UFC on Fuel TV: Munoz vs. Weidman. After nearly finishing Craig, Natal lost via head kick KO with seconds remaining in round two.

Natal was expected to face Magnus Cedenblad on January 26, 2013 at UFC on Fox 6. However, Cedenblad pulled out of the bout citing an injury and was replaced by promotional newcomer Sean Spencer. Natal defeated Spencer via third round submission.

Natal was expected to face Chris Camozzi on May 18, 2013 at UFC on FX 8. However, Camozzi was pulled from the matchup with Natal in favor of a matchup with Ronaldo Souza at the same event after Souza's scheduled opponent Costas Philippou pulled out of the bout with an injury. Natal instead faced promotional newcomer Joao Zeferino. He won the back-and-forth fight via unanimous decision.

Natal faced Tor Troéng on September 4, 2013 at UFC Fight Night 28. He won the fight via unanimous decision. The bout also earned him his first Fight of the Night bonus award.

Natal was expected to face Ed Herman on November 16, 2013 at UFC 167. However, after Michael Bisping pull out of his fight with Mark Muñoz at UFC Fight Night 30, Tim Kennedy's original opponent Lyoto Machida filled in for Bisping thus giving Natal the spot to face Kennedy at UFC Fight Night 31. He lost the fight via knockout in the first round.

Natal faced Ed Herman on May 10, 2014 at UFC Fight Night 40. He lost the fight via unanimous decision.

A rescheduled bout with Chris Camozzi took place on September 5, 2014 at UFC Fight Night 50. Natal defeated Camozzi via split decision.

Natal next faced Tom Watson on January 31, 2015 at UFC 183. He won the fight by unanimous decision.

Natal faced Uriah Hall on May 23, 2015 at UFC 187. Natal defeated Hall via split decision.

Natal faced Kevin Casey on January 30, 2016 at UFC on Fox 18. He won the fight via TKO in the third round.

Natal faced Robert Whittaker on April 23, 2016 at UFC 197. Natal lost the back and forth fight via unanimous decision.

Natal next faced Tim Boetsch on November 12, 2016 at UFC 205. He lost the fight via TKO in the first round.

Natal was expected to face Alessio Di Chirico on July 22, 2017 at UFC on Fox 25. However, Di Chirico pulled out in the weeks leading up to the event with a neck injury and was replaced by promotional newcomer Eryk Anders. Natal lost the fight via knockout in the first round.

After Natal retired from professional fighting, he took up the role as the president of Dominance MMA in Brazil.

== Retirement ==
On October 2, 2017, Natal announced his retirement as a professional MMA fighter, with a record of 21-9-1.

== Championships and accomplishments ==
- Ultimate Fighting Championship
  - Fight of the Night (One time)

== Mixed martial arts record ==
Professional record breakdown
31 matches	21 wins	9 losses
By knockout	4	6
By submission	8	0
By decision	9	3
Draws	1	

Res.	Record	Opponent	Method	Event	Date	Round	Time	Location	Notes
Loss	21–9–1	Eryk Anders	KO (punches)	UFC on Fox: Weidman vs. Gastelum	July 22, 2017	1	2:54	Uniondale, New York, United States	
Loss	21–8–1	Tim Boetsch	KO (punches)	UFC 205	November 12, 2016	1	3:22	New York City, New York, United States	
Loss	21–7–1	Robert Whittaker	Decision (unanimous)	UFC 197	April 23, 2016	3	5:00	Las Vegas, Nevada, United States	
Win	21–6–1	Kevin Casey	TKO (punches)	UFC on Fox: Johnson vs. Bader	January 30, 2016	3	3:37	Newark, New Jersey, United States	
Win	20–6–1	Uriah Hall	Decision (split)	UFC 187	May 23, 2015	3	5:00	Las Vegas, Nevada, United States	
Win	19–6–1	Tom Watson	Decision (unanimous)	UFC 183	January 31, 2015	3	5:00	Las Vegas, Nevada, United States	
Win	18–6–1	Chris Camozzi	Decision (split)	UFC Fight Night: Jacaré vs. Mousasi	September 5, 2014	3	5:00	Mashantucket, Connecticut, United States	
Loss	17–6–1	Ed Herman	Decision (unanimous)	UFC Fight Night: Brown vs. Silva	May 10, 2014	3	5:00	Cincinnati, Ohio, United States	
Loss	17–5–1	Tim Kennedy	KO (punch)	UFC: Fight for the Troops 3	November 6, 2013	1	4:40	Fort Campbell, Kentucky, United States	
Win	17–4–1	Tor Troéng	Decision (unanimous)	UFC Fight Night: Teixeira vs. Bader	September 4, 2013	3	5:00	Belo Horizonte, Brazil	Fight of the Night.
Win	16–4–1	João Zeferino	Decision (unanimous)	UFC on FX: Belfort vs. Rockhold	May 18, 2013	3	5:00	Jaraguá do Sul, Brazil	
Win	15–4–1	Sean Spencer	Submission (arm-triangle choke)	UFC on Fox: Johnson vs. Dodson	January 26, 2013	3	2:13	Chicago, Illinois, United States	
Loss	14–4–1	Andrew Craig	KO (head kick)	UFC on Fuel TV: Munoz vs. Weidman	July 11, 2012	2	4:52	San Jose, California, United States	
Win	14–3–1	Michael Kuiper	Decision (unanimous)	UFC 143	February 4, 2012	3	5:00	Las Vegas, Nevada, United States	
Win	13–3–1	Paul Bradley	Decision (unanimous)	UFC 133	August 6, 2011	3	5:00	Philadelphia, Pennsylvania, United States	
Draw	12–3–1	Jesse Bongfeldt	Draw (majority)	UFC 124	December 11, 2010	3	5:00	Montreal, Quebec, Canada	
Loss	12–3	Rich Attonito	Decision (unanimous)	UFC Fight Night: Marquardt vs. Palhares	September 15, 2010	3	5:00	Austin, Texas, United States	
Win	12–2	Travis Lutter	KO (punches)	Moosin: God of Martial Arts	May 21, 2010	1	4:12	Worcester, Massachusetts, United States	
Win	11–2	Allan Weickert	Submission (rear-naked choke)	Ring of Combat 26	September 11, 2009	1	2:53	Atlantic City, New Jersey, United States	
Loss	10–2	Victor O'Donnell	TKO (doctor stoppage)	Ring of Combat 25	June 12, 2009	1	5:00	Atlantic City, New Jersey, United States	Lost the Ring of Combat Middleweight Championship.
Win	10–1	Plinio Cruz	Submission (rear-naked choke)	Ring of Combat 24	April 17, 2009	2	3:13	Atlantic City, New Jersey, United States	Defended the Ring of Combat Middleweight Championship.
Win	9–1	Alexandre Moreno	KO (punch)	Ring of Combat 23	February 20, 2009	1	3:59	Atlantic City, New Jersey, United States	Won the Ring of Combat Middleweight Championship.
Win	8–1	Jon Kirk	Submission (rear-naked choke)	SWC 2: Battleground	November 28, 2008	1	3:19	Frisco, Texas, United States	
Loss	7–1	Eduardo Telles	KO (head kick)	Fury FC 6: High Voltage	July 12, 2008	2	2:18	Rio de Janeiro, Brazil	
Win	7–0	Silmar Rodrigo	Decision (unanimous)	Mo Team League 1	August 11, 2007	3	5:00	São Paulo, Brazil	
Win	6–0	Gerson Silva	Decision	XFC Brazil	April 29, 2007	3	5:00	Rio de Janeiro, Brazil	
Win	5–0	Nailson Bahia	Submission (armbar)	XFC Brazil	April 29, 2007	1	1:24	Rio de Janeiro, Brazil	
Win	4–0	Danillo Villefort	TKO (punches)	Gold Fighters Championship 1	May 20, 2006	1	N/A	Rio de Janeiro, Brazil	
Win	3–0	Carlos Eduardo dos Santos	Submission (guillotine choke)	Wild Fight 1	October 1, 2005	2	2:46	Juiz de Fora, Brazil	
Win	2–0	Walter Luis	Submission (keylock)	Champions Night 12	May 6, 2005	2	0:55	São Paulo, Brazil	
Win	1–0	Emerson Avila	Submission (rear-naked choke)	Champions Night 12	May 6, 2005	1	1:58	São Paulo, Brazil	

== See also ==
- List of current UFC fighters
- List of male mixed martial artists
