= Daniel Roberts (fighter) =

American mixed martial arts fighter

- Born: Daniel Lamar Roberts; August 5, 1980 (age 46); Rockford, Illinois, U.S.
- Other names: Ninja
- Height: 5 ft 10 in (1.78 m)
- Weight: 170 lb (77 kg; 12 st)
- Division: Welterweight
- Reach: 74 in (190 cm)
- Fighting out of: San Francisco, California, U.S.
- Team: Cesar Gracie Jiu-Jitsu; Fairtex Gym
- Rank: Black Belt in Brazilian Jiu-Jitsu Under Jake Shields
- Wrestling: NAIA Wrestling
- Years active: 2007-2015

Mixed martial arts record
- Total: 21
- Wins: 15
- By knockout: 2
- By submission: 9
- By decision: 4
- Losses: 6
- By knockout: 1
- By decision: 5

Other information
- Mixed martial arts record from Sherdog

Daniel Lamar Roberts (born August 5, 1980) is an American mixed martial artist who last competed in 2015. A professional since 2007, he is a veteran of the UFC, Pancrase, Titan FC, and Legacy FC.

== Background ==
Roberts is a graduate of Bacone College in Muskogee, Oklahoma, where he majored in Business Administration. At Bacone College, Roberts was a standout athlete and an NAIA All-American wrestler. Roberts also has 12 years of jiu-jitsu experience and is proficient in Karate, Judo and Boxing.

He recently moved out to California to train with Gilbert Melendez and his team, the Skrap Pack. He also trains at Fairtex Muay Thai in San Francisco.

== Mixed martial arts career ==
=== Early career ===
Roberts made his professional debut in 2007, and moved to 9-0 before being signed by the UFC.

=== Ultimate Fighting Championship ===
Roberts signed a four-fight deal with the UFC in March 2010. He made his debut on short notice, filling in for an injured Anthony Johnson to fight John Howard at UFC Live: Vera vs. Jones. After an exciting grappling affair in the first two minutes, Howard delivered a punch that knocked Roberts unconscious.

Roberts was expected to fight Julio Paulino at UFC 116, but Paulino was forced from the card with an injury. Roberts instead fought veteran Forrest Petz. Roberts won the fight via split decision.

Roberts fought and quickly defeated Mike Guymon on October 23, 2010 at UFC 121. The fight barely passed the minute mark in the first round before Roberts applied an anaconda choke, and earned the submission win. His submission win also earned him the 'Submission of the Night' honors.

On January 1, 2011 at UFC 125, Roberts fought Greg Soto and after some early back-and-forth grappling, Roberts grabbed Soto's arm in a kimura, took top position and forced the tapout with just over a minute left in the opening round.

Roberts then faced fellow up-and-comer, Claude Patrick, on April 30, 2011 at UFC 129. On the judges scorecards, Roberts lost two of the three rounds, ultimately losing the fight via unanimous decision (29–28, 29–28, 29–28).

When injuries caused shuffling at UFC on Versus 4, taking place June 26, 2011, Roberts stepped in on very short notice to fight Rich Attonito. Roberts lost the fight via unanimous decision (29–27, 30–27, 29–28).

Roberts was expected to face TJ Waldburger on September 17, 2011 at UFC Fight Night 25. However, he had to pull out due to injury and was replaced by Mike Stumpf.

Roberts next faced Charlie Brenneman on January 20, 2012 at UFC on FX: Guillard vs. Miller. He lost the fight via unanimous decision. He was later released from the promotion following three consecutive losses.

=== Post-UFC career ===
In his first fight after his UFC release, Roberts would face Nuri Shakir at Freedom Fight MMA on October 27, 2012. He won the fight via rear-naked choke submission in the second round. Roberts would then get his second straight submission win, when he submitted UFC veteran Brian Foster via rear-naked choke at Combat MMA on May 18, 2013.

He then faced Justin Baesman at War MMA 1 on June 22, 2013. He lost the fight via split decision.

After a near one-year hiatus, Roberts faced Brock Jardine at Titan FC 28: Brilz vs. Davis on May 16, 2014. He won the fight via split decision.

== Personal life ==
A week before his win at UFC 125, Roberts found out he was a father to a daughter named Gabrielle.

== Championships and accomplishments ==
- Ultimate Fighting Championship
  - Submission of the Night (One time) vs. Mike Guymon
  - UFC.com Awards
    - 2010: Ranked #7 Newcomer of the Year

== Mixed martial arts record ==
Professional record breakdown
22 matches	15 wins	7 losses
By knockout	2	1
By submission	9	1
By decision	4	5

Res.	Record	Opponent	Method	Event	Date	Round	Time	Location	Notes
Loss	15–7	Akihiro Murayama	Decision (split)	Pancrase: 266	April 26, 2015	3	5:00	Tokyo, Japan	
Loss	15–6	Derrick Krantz	Submission (Von Flue choke)	Legacy FC 35	September 26, 2014	1	2:49	Tulsa, Oklahoma, United States	
Win	15–5	Brock Jardine	Decision (split)	Titan FC 28: Brilz vs. Davis	May 16, 2014	3	5:00	Newkirk, Oklahoma, United States	
Loss	14–5	Justin Baesman	Decision (split)	War MMA 1	June 22, 2013	3	5:00	Stockton, California, United States	
Win	14–4	Brian Foster	Submission (rear-naked choke)	Combat MMA	May 18, 2013	1	1:29	Tulsa, Oklahoma, United States	
Win	13–4	Nuri Shakir	Submission (rear-naked choke)	Freedom Fight MMA	October 27, 2012	2	2:55	Sudbury, Ontario, Canada	Catchweight (180 lbs) bout.
Loss	12–4	Charlie Brenneman	Decision (unanimous)	UFC on FX: Guillard vs. Miller	January 20, 2012	3	5:00	Nashville, Tennessee, United States	
Loss	12–3	Rich Attonito	Decision (unanimous)	UFC Live: Kongo vs. Barry	June 26, 2011	3	5:00	Pittsburgh, Pennsylvania, United States	
Loss	12–2	Claude Patrick	Decision (unanimous)	UFC 129	April 30, 2011	3	5:00	Toronto, Ontario, Canada	
Win	12–1	Greg Soto	Submission (kimura)	UFC 125	January 1, 2011	1	3:45	Las Vegas, Nevada, United States	
Win	11–1	Mike Guymon	Submission (anaconda choke)	UFC 121	October 23, 2010	1	1:13	Anaheim, California, United States	Submission of the Night.
Win	10–1	Forrest Petz	Decision (split)	UFC 116	July 3, 2010	3	5:00	Las Vegas, Nevada, United States	
Loss	9–1	John Howard	KO (punch)	UFC Live: Vera vs. Jones	March 21, 2010	1	2:01	Broomfield, Colorado, United States	
Win	9–0	Anthony Macias	TKO (submission to punches)	XFL: New Year's Revolution	Jan 16, 2010	1	4:00	Tulsa, Oklahoma, United States	
Win	8–0	Mike Jackson	Submission (rear-naked choke)	Bricktown Brawl 2	Aug 28, 2009	1	1:33	Oklahoma City, Oklahoma, United States	
Win	7–0	Jeff Lindsay	TKO (submission to punches)	Bricktown Brawl 1	May 8, 2009	1	1:14	Oklahoma City, Oklahoma, United States	
Win	6–0	Gabriel Vasquez	Submission (kimura)	C3 Fights	January 30, 2009	1	1:37	Clinton, Oklahoma, United States	
Win	5–0	Levi Avera	Submission (kimura)	Freestyle Cage Fighting	September 21, 2008	2	2:45	Oklahoma City, Oklahoma, United States	
Win	4–0	Akira Ninjo	Decision (unanimous)	Extreme Fighting League	March 15, 2008	3	4:00	Tulsa, Oklahoma, United States	
Win	3–0	Danny Grass	Submission (rear-naked choke)	Extreme Fighting League	January 25, 2008	1	0:56	Miami, Oklahoma, United States	
Win	2–0	Jeremy Michael	Submission (arm-triangle choke)	Extreme Fighting League	November 10, 2007	1	1:20	Catoosa, Oklahoma, United States	
Win	1–0	Brandon Gaines	Decision (split)	Extreme Fighting League	September 8, 2007	3	N/A	Oklahoma, United States	
