= Sean Pierson =

Canadian mixed martial artist

- Born: March 10, 1976 (age 50); Toronto, Ontario, Canada
- Nickname: The Punisher
- Height: 6 ft 0 in (1.83 m)
- Weight: 170 lb (77 kg; 12 st)
- Division: Middleweight; Welterweight
- Reach: 76 in (193 cm)
- Stance: Southpaw
- Fighting out of: Toronto, Ontario, Canada
- Team: Grant Brothers MMA / Tapstar / Bruckmann Martial Arts
- Rank: Black belt in Brazilian jiu-jitsu
- Years active: 1999-2013

Mixed martial arts record
- Total: 20
- Wins: 14
- By knockout: 6
- By submission: 4
- By decision: 4
- Losses: 6
- By knockout: 3
- By submission: 1
- By decision: 2

Other information
- Website: http://seanpierson.com/
- Mixed martial arts record from Sherdog

Sean Ian Pierson (born March 10, 1976) is a retired Canadian mixed martial artist. A professional from 1999 until 2013, he fought for the Ultimate Fighting Championship (UFC) and Bellator.

== Background ==
Pierson began wrestling in the fourth grade and competed all the way through college, attending Brock University, and was a member of the Canadian National Team for the Greco-Roman and Freestyle categories. Pierson's other accomplishments in the sport include winning multiple national championships in the Greco-Roman category and a Canadian university national freestyle championship. Pierson also trained in judo during high school.

== Mixed martial arts career ==
=== Bellator Fighting Championships ===
Pierson was set to compete in Bellator's Second Season Welterweight Tournament but an injury forced him out of the tournament. He was set to have his first fight against Dan Hornbuckle which would have taken place at Bellator 15.

=== Ultimate Fighting Championship ===
After TJ Waldburger had to pull out of his fight with Matthew Riddle at UFC 124 due to injury, it was announced on October 27 that Pierson had signed with the UFC to step in on short notice. After outstriking Riddle over three fast-paced rounds, Pierson won a unanimous decision (30–27, 30–27, 30–27). The fight was dubbed by Dana White as the real Fight of the Night.

Pierson was expected to face Brian Foster on April 30, 2011, at UFC 129. However, Foster was forced out of the bout with an injury, and replaced by Jake Ellenberger. Pierson lost to Ellenberger via first-round KO after he was caught by a counter left.

Pierson fought Dong Hyun Kim on December 30, 2011, at UFC 141. Pierson was defeated by Kim via unanimous decision (30-27, 30-27, 30-27).

Pierson defeated Jake Hecht by unanimous decision on June 8, 2012, at UFC on FX 3.

Pierson was expected to face Dan Miller on September 22, 2012, at UFC 152. However, Miller pulled out of the bout after getting news about his son's kidney transplant operation and was replaced by Lance Benoist. Pierson defeated Benoist via unanimous decision.

Pierson was expected to face Rick Story on March 16, 2013, at UFC 158. However, he was forced out of the bout with an injury and replaced by Quinn Mulhern.

Pierson was expected to face TJ Waldburger on June 15, 2013, at UFC 161. However, Waldburger was pulled from the event and replaced by Kenny Robertson. Despite being hurt in the third round, Pierson won the fight by majority decision.

== Personal life ==
Pierson lives in the town of Whitchurch-Stouffville north of downtown Toronto, is married and has two sons. Pierson has at least temporarily left his job at the Toronto police force, since they would not allow him to have a secondary source of income as a UFC fighter while being employed by the force. The police force was against Pierson's participation in these events because of the nickname "Pimp Daddy" he used in his early twenties.

Sean Pierson has been involved with several other UFC fighters (Sam Stout, Mark Hominick, and Matt Mitrione) as part of a Toronto area anti-bullying program.

Pierson is a top video game player having won tournaments and finishing third in a Canada Wonderland tournament.

== Mixed martial arts record ==
Professional record breakdown
20 matches	14 wins	6 losses
By knockout	7	3
By submission	3	1
By decision	4	2

Res.	Record	Opponent	Method	Event	Date	Round	Time	Location	Notes
Win	14–6	Kenny Robertson	Decision (majority)	UFC 161	June 15, 2013	3	5:00	Winnipeg, Manitoba, Canada	
Win	13–6	Lance Benoist	Decision (unanimous)	UFC 152	September 22, 2012	3	5:00	Toronto, Ontario, Canada	
Win	12–6	Jake Hecht	Decision (unanimous)	UFC on FX: Johnson vs. McCall	June 8, 2012	3	5:00	Sunrise, Florida, United States	
Loss	11–6	Dong Hyun Kim	Decision (unanimous)	UFC 141	December 30, 2011	3	5:00	Las Vegas, Nevada, United States	
Loss	11–5	Jake Ellenberger	KO (punches)	UFC 129	April 30, 2011	1	2:42	Toronto, Ontario, Canada	
Win	11–4	Matthew Riddle	Decision (unanimous)	UFC 124	December 11, 2010	3	5:00	Montreal, Quebec, Canada	
Win	10–4	Ricky Goodall	TKO (punches)	W-1 New Ground	October 23, 2010	1	1:44	Halifax, Nova Scotia, Canada	
Win	9–4	Fabio Holanda	KO (punches)	Wreck MMA: Fight for the Troops	December 12, 2009	1	1:41	Gatineau, Quebec, Canada	Catchweight (173 lbs) bout.
Win	8–4	Jason Rorison	TKO (punches and knees to the body)	Ringside MMA: Rage Fighting	August 22, 2009	1	3:57	Montreal, Quebec, Canada	
Win	7–4	Iraj Hadin	TKO (punches)	W-1 MMA 2: Unplugged	June 13, 2009	1	2:55	Gatineau, Quebec, Canada	
Win	6–4	Jacob MacDonald	Submission (punches)	TKO 35: Quenneville vs Hioki	October 3, 2008	1	1:45	Montreal, Quebec, Canada	
Loss	5–4	Jesse Bongfeldt	TKO (punches)	HCF: Unfinished Business	July 21, 2007	2	4:41	Alberta, Canada	
Win	5–3	Chester Post	TKO (punches)	TKO: MMA 2007 Tourney	March 17, 2007	1	1:52	Victoriaville, Quebec, Canada	
Loss	4–3	Steve Vigneault	Decision (unanimous)	TKO 13: Ultimate Rush	September 6, 2003	3	5:00	Montreal, Quebec, Canada	
Win	4–2	Mark Colangelo	Submission (armbar)	UCC 10: Battle for the Belts 2002	June 15, 2002	1	4:19	Gatineau, Quebec, Canada	
Loss	3–2	John Alessio	KO (head kick)	UCC 7: Bad Boyz	January 25, 2002	2	1:14	Montreal, Quebec, Canada	
Win	3–1	Ali Nestor Charles	Submission (heel hook)	UCC 3: Battle for the Belts	January 27, 2001	1	2:09	Sherbrooke, Quebec, Canada	
Loss	2–1	Chad Saunders	Submission (heel hook)	IFC: Warriors Challenge 8	June 14, 2000	1	1:11	Friant, California, United States	
Win	2–0	Steve Vigneault	TKO (punches)	IFC: Battleground 2000	January 22, 2000	1	1:17	Kahnawake, Quebec, Canada	Welterweight debut.
Win	1–0	Steve Vigneault	TKO (punches)	IFC: Montreal Cage Combat	October 9, 1999	1	1:07	Montreal, Quebec, Canada	

== See also ==
- List of male mixed martial artists
- List of Canadian UFC fighters
