= Rich Attonito =

American mixed martial arts fighter

- Born: June 16, 1977 (age 49); Elizabeth, New Jersey, United States
- Other names: The Raging Bull
- Nationality: American
- Height: 5 ft 10 in (1.78 m)
- Weight: 170 lb (77 kg; 12 st)
- Division: Light Heavyweight; Middleweight; Welterweight
- Reach: 72 in (183 cm)
- Stance: Orthodox
- Fighting out of: Coconut Creek, Florida, United States
- Team: American Top Team
- Rank: Brown belt in Brazilian Jiu-Jitsu; NCAA Division I Wrestling
- Years active: 2004-2011

Mixed martial arts record
- Total: 15
- Wins: 10
- By knockout: 4
- By submission: 2
- By decision: 4
- Losses: 5
- By knockout: 2
- By submission: 1
- By decision: 2

Other information
- Mixed martial arts record from Sherdog

Rich Attonito (born June 16, 1977) is a retired American mixed martial artist. A professional from 2004 until 2011, he fought in the UFC, Cage Warriors, King of the Cage, and was contestant on the 11th season of The Ultimate Fighter.

== Background ==
Born and raised in New Jersey, Attonito was a 2001 graduate of Hofstra University in Long Island. Attonito wrestled several different weight classes as a member of the Pride wrestling team including the 167 lbs. and 197 lbs. divisions, picking up the team's award for "Most Improved Wrestler" in 2000.

== Mixed martial arts ==
=== Early career ===
Attonito's interest in mixed martial arts was piqued when he saw his teammate from college, Phil Baroni, take the UFC by storm. However, he did not jump headlong into the sport until 2004, when, while working as a personal trainer in New Jersey, one of his coworkers and former heavyweight boxing title-contender Leo Loiacono, challenged him to make the most of his athletic abilities by competing in MMA. Attonito began training in boxing and jiu jitsu and soon took his first fight six months later. After his fifth fight, in 2006, members of the American Top Team camp approached Attonito to see if he would be interested in training with them down in Florida.

=== The Ultimate Fighter ===
In March 2010, Attonito was announced as part of the eleventh season of The Ultimate Fighter.

In his first fight, to gain entry into the TUF house, Attonito defeated Lyle Steffens via unanimous decision (20–18, 20–18, 20–18). Chuck Liddell selected Attonito as his second pick, making him the 4th overall pick out of 14 competitors.

Rich's second fight came was against Kyacey Uscola. The fight ended due to Uscola throwing two illegal knees in round one, giving Rich the DQ win. After an MRI, it was revealed that Rich had broken his hand during the fight and will be unable to continue in the tournament. Rich's spot in the quarter-finals of the competition was taken by Court McGee, after perceived controversy over his loss to Nick Ring.

=== Ultimate Fighting Championship ===
Rich made his UFC debut at TUF 11 Finale against Team Ortiz fighter, Jamie Yager. He won the fight via TKO in the second round.

At UFC Fight Night: Marquardt vs. Palhares, Attonito faced debuting Brazilian Rafael Natal. Attonito won the fight via unanimous decision (29–28, 29–28, 30–27). During the first round of the fight, Attonito dropped Natal with a right hook which almost prompted the referee to stop the fight. The rest of the fight was close, however the knockdown was enough for Attonito to take the decision.

Attonito fought David Branch on December 4, 2010, at The Ultimate Fighter 12 Finale. He lost the fight via unanimous decision, getting dominated for all three rounds by Branch's superior ground skills.

Attonito was expected to drop to welterweight and face Matt Brown on June 26, 2011, at UFC on Versus 4. However, Martin Kampmann was forced out of his bout with John Howard with an injury and Brown was chosen as his replacement, while Attonito faced Daniel Roberts. He won the fight via unanimous decision (29–27, 30–27, 29–28).

Attonito faced promotional newcomer Jake Hecht on December 10, 2011, at UFC 140. He lost the fight via TKO in the second round.

Attonito was expected to face Rick Story on June 22, 2012, at UFC on FX 4. However, Attonito was forced out of the bout with an injury and replaced by Papy Abedi.

Attonito was briefly linked to a bout against promotional newcomer Gunnar Nelson in a catchweight bout, contested at 175 lb. on September 29, 2012, at UFC on Fuel TV 5, replacing an injured Pascal Krauss. However, Attonito had reservations about taking the short notice bout due to the weight cut requirements and DaMarques Johnson took on Nelson instead. After turning down the fight with Nelson at both 170 lbs. and at 175 lb. catchweight, Attonito was released from the UFC.

== Mixed martial arts record ==
Professional record breakdown
15 matches	10 wins	5 losses
By knockout	4	2
By submission	2	1
By decision	4	2

Res.	Record	Opponent	Method	Event	Date	Round	Time	Location	Notes
Loss	10–5	Jake Hecht	TKO (elbows and punches)	UFC 140	December 10, 2011	2	1:10	Toronto, Ontario, Canada	
Win	10–4	Daniel Roberts	Decision (unanimous)	UFC Live: Kongo vs. Barry	June 26, 2011	3	5:00	Pittsburgh, Pennsylvania, United States	Return to Welterweight.
Loss	9–4	David Branch	Decision (unanimous)	The Ultimate Fighter 12 Finale	December 4, 2010	3	5:00	Las Vegas, Nevada, United States	
Win	9–3	Rafael Natal	Decision (unanimous)	UFC Fight Night: Marquardt vs. Palhares	September 15, 2010	3	5:00	Austin, Texas, United States	
Win	8–3	Jamie Yager	TKO (punches)	The Ultimate Fighter 11 Finale	June 19, 2010	2	4:25	Las Vegas, Nevada, United States	
Win	7–3	Gregory Babene	Decision (unanimous)	XC-1: Xtreme MMA Championship	June 18, 2009	3	5:00	Rome, Italy	
Win	6–3	Uber Gallegos	Submission (arm-triangle choke)	KOTC: Hurricane	February 21, 2009	1	3:31	Ft. Lauderdale, Florida, United States	Return to Middleweight.
Loss	5–3	Isidro Gonzalez	Submission (armbar)	Cage Warriors 36: USA Destruction	January 30, 2009	1	4:21	Orlando, Florida, United States	Welterweight debut.
Win	5–2	Ryan Hodge	TKO (punches)	WFC 6: Battle in the Bay	March 22, 2008	3	1:23	Tampa, Florida, United States	
Win	4–2	Rolando Dominique	Submission (rear-naked choke)	Ultimate Gladiator Championship	December 14, 2007	1	4:06	Miami, Florida, United States	Middleweight debut.
Loss	3–2	Bristol Marunde	TKO (punches)	Euphoria: USA vs. Russia	November 5, 2005	3	1:57	Atlantic City, New Jersey, United States	
Win	3–1	Lance Everson	Decision (unanimous)	Reality Fighting 9	August 6, 2005	3	5:00	Wildwood, New Jersey, United States	Won the vacant Reality Fighting Light Heavyweight Championship.
Win	2–1	Mark Raposa	TKO (punches)	Mass Destruction 18	December 11, 2004	N/A	N/A	Boston, Massachusetts, United States	
Loss	1–1	Mike Marshall	Decision (split)	Mass Destruction 16	May 15, 2004	N/A	N/A	Boston, Massachusetts, United States	
Win	1–0	Mike Mitchell	TKO (punches)	Mass Destruction 15	February 21, 2004	1	2:26	Boston, Massachusetts, United States	
