= Jake Hecht =

American mixed martial arts fighter

- Born: Jake Hecht; February 9, 1984 (age 42); St. Louis, Missouri
- Other names: Hitman
- Nationality: American
- Height: 6 ft 0 in (1.83 m)
- Weight: 170 lb (77 kg; 12 st 2 lb)
- Division: Middleweight; Welterweight
- Fighting out of: Springfield, Illinois
- Team: Fiore MMA/MMA Clinic
- Years active: 2006; 2008-2012

Mixed martial arts record
- Total: 15
- Wins: 11
- By knockout: 3
- By submission: 5
- By decision: 3
- Losses: 4
- By submission: 1
- By decision: 3

Other information
- University: University of Missouri
- Mixed martial arts record from Sherdog
- Last updated on: November 11, 2011

Jake Hecht (born February 9, 1984) is a retired American mixed martial artist. A professional from 2006 until 2012, he competed in the UFC.

== Career ==
=== Background ===
After finishing at the University of Missouri in 2006, Hecht began his mixed martial arts career in regional promotions, before going on the international scene in 2010. Hecht compiled an impressive 10-2 professional record including notable wins over The Ultimate Fighter 13 alum Charlie Rader and future UFC Light Heavyweight Championship challenger Anthony Smith.

=== Ultimate Fighting Championship ===
Hecht made his promotional debut against Rich Attonito on December 10, 2011 at UFC 140. Hecht won the fight in the second round by way of TKO due to elbows and strikes from top position.

Hecht next faced TJ Waldburger on March 3, 2012 at UFC on FX 2. He lost the fight via submission in the first round.

Hecht was defeated by Sean Pierson on June 8, 2012 at UFC on FX 3 via unanimous decision.

Following his loss to Pierson, Hecht was released from the promotion.

== Mixed martial arts record ==
Professional record breakdown
| 15 matches | 11 wins | 4 losses |
| By knockout | 3 | 0 |
| By submission | 5 | 1 |
| By decision | 3 | 3 |

| Res. | Record | Opponent | Method | Event | Date | Round | Time | Location | Notes |
|---|---|---|---|---|---|---|---|---|---|
| Loss | 11–4 | Sean Pierson | Decision (unanimous) | UFC on FX: Johnson vs. McCall | June 8, 2012 | 3 | 5:00 | Sunrise, Florida, United States | |
| Loss | 11–3 | TJ Waldburger | Submission (armbar) | UFC on FX: Alves vs. Kampmann | March 3, 2012 | 1 | 0:55 | Sydney, Australia | |
| Win | 11–2 | Rich Attonito | TKO (elbows and punches) | UFC 140 | December 10, 2011 | 2 | 1:10 | Toronto, Ontario, Canada | Welterweight debut. |
| Win | 10–2 | Michele Verginelli | Decision (unanimous) | Cage Warriors: Fight Night 1 | June 16, 2011 | 3 | 5:00 | Amman, Jordan | |
| Win | 9–2 | Craig White | Submission (north-south choke) | Cage Warriors: 42 | May 28, 2011 | 2 | 4:58 | Cork, Ireland | |
| Win | 8–2 | Eddie Larrea | TKO (punches) | PCL: Cage Madness | March 26, 2011 | 3 | 1:22 | Glen Carbon, Illinois, United States | |
| Loss | 7–2 | Che Mills | Decision (unanimous) | Cage Warriors 38: Young Guns | October 1, 2010 | 3 | 5:00 | London, England | |
| Win | 7–1 | Charlie Rader | Decision (unanimous) | Empire FC: A Night of Reckoning 2 | February 27, 2010 | 3 | 5:00 | Tunica, Mississippi, United States | |
| Win | 6–1 | Anthony Smith | TKO (punches) | VFC 30: Night of Champions | February 5, 2010 | 3 | 4:35 | Council Bluffs, Iowa, United States | |
| Win | 5–1 | Andy Uhrich | Submission (triangle choke) | CA: Battlegrounds | August 22, 2009 | 2 | 2:02 | Millington, Tennessee, United States | |
| Win | 4–1 | David Brown | Decision (unanimous) | Cage Assault: On Edge | June 20, 2009 | 3 | 5:00 | Memphis, Tennessee, United States | |
| Win | 3–1 | Sean Westbrook | Submission (north-south choke) | VFC 27: Mayhem | May 1, 2009 | 2 | 3:48 | Council Bluffs, Iowa, United States | |
| Win | 2–1 | Matt Miller | Submission (triangle choke) | EFL: Elite Fight League | July 28, 2008 | 1 | 4:24 | Council Bluffs, Iowa, United States | |
| Win | 1–1 | Cody Frye | Submission (rear naked choke) | MFL: Midwest Fight League | March 21, 2008 | 1 | 4:27 | Boonville, Missouri, United States | |
| Loss | 0–1 | Manuel Garcia | Decision (unanimous) | AFC: Absolute Fighting Championships 16 | April 22, 2006 | 2 | 5:00 | Boca Raton, Florida, United States | |
