= UFC 161 =

UFC mixed martial arts event in 2013

UFC 161: Evans vs. Henderson
- The poster for UFC 161: Evans vs. Henderson
- Promotion: Ultimate Fighting Championship
- Date: June 15, 2013
- Venue: MTS Centre
- City: Winnipeg, Manitoba, Canada
- Attendance: 14,754
- Total gate: $3.15 million
- Buyrate: 140,000

Event chronology
UFC on Fuel TV: Nogueira vs. Werdum	UFC 161: Evans vs. Henderson	UFC 162: Silva vs. Weidman

UFC 161: Evans vs. Henderson was a mixed martial arts event held on June 15, 2013, at the MTS Centre in Winnipeg, Manitoba, Canada.

== Background ==
While the UFC has hosted several events in the past in Canada, the event was the first that the organization has hosted in Manitoba.

The event was expected to feature an Interim Bantamweight Championship bout between the current champion Renan Barão, and former WEC Bantamweight Champion and top contender Eddie Wineland. However, on May 21 it was confirmed that Barão had pulled out of the bout, citing a foot injury. With, Barão's departure, Wineland was removed from the card as well. As a result, the scheduled bout between Rashad Evans and Dan Henderson was moved up the card and served as the headliner in a three round bout.

TJ Waldburger was expected to face Sean Pierson at the event. However, Waldburger was pulled from the event and replaced by Kenny Robertson.

Stipe Miocic was scheduled to face returning veteran Soa Palelei on the undercard, but due to the change in the main event, UFC bolstered the main card and replaced Palelei with Roy Nelson. As a result, Palelei was removed from the card, but attended fight week activities as potential replacement for either two heavyweight fights at the event.

Isaac Vallie-Flagg was expected to face Sam Stout at the event. However, Vallie-Flagg was forced out with a back injury and was replaced by James Krause.

Antônio Rogério Nogueira was expected to face Maurício Rua in a rematch in the co-main event. However, Nogueira pulled out of the bout in the days leading up to the event citing a back injury. Chael Sonnen was briefly linked as a replacement for Nogueira. However, an alleged visa issue created a problem for Sonnen to get into Canada, resulting in Rua being pulled from the event altogether.

== Results ==
Main card
Weight class				Method	Round	Time	Notes
Light Heavyweight	Rashad Evans	def.	Dan Henderson	Decision (split) (28–29, 29–28, 29–28)	3	5:00
Heavyweight	Stipe Miocic	def.	Roy Nelson	Decision (unanimous) (30–27, 30–27, 30–27)	3	5:00
Light Heavyweight	Ryan Jimmo	def.	Igor Pokrajac	Decision (unanimous) (30–27, 30–27, 30–27)	3	5:00
Women's Bantamweight	Alexis Davis	def.	Rosi Sexton	Decision (unanimous) (29–28, 29–27, 29–28)	3	5:00
Heavyweight	Shawn Jordan	def.	Pat Barry	TKO (punches)	1	0:59
Preliminary card (FX)
Welterweight	Jake Shields	def.	Tyron Woodley	Decision (split) (27–30, 29–28, 29–28)	3	5:00
Lightweight	James Krause	def.	Sam Stout	Submission (guillotine choke)	3	4:47
Welterweight	Sean Pierson	def.	Kenny Robertson	Decision (majority) (29–28, 29–28, 28–28)	3	5:00
Bantamweight	Roland Delorme	def.	Edwin Figueroa	Decision (unanimous) (29–28, 29–28, 29–28)	3	5:00
Preliminary card (Facebook)
Lightweight	Mitch Clarke	def.	John Maguire	Decision (unanimous) (29–28, 29–28, 29–28)	3	5:00
Bantamweight	Yves Jabouin	def.	Dustin Pague	Decision (split) (28–29, 29–28, 29–28)	3	5:00

== Bonus awards ==
The following fighters received $50,000 bonuses.

- Fight of the Night: Sam Stout vs. James Krause
- Knockout of the Night: Shawn Jordan
- Submission of the Night: James Krause

== See also ==
- List of UFC events
- 2013 in UFC
