= Brian Ebersole =

American mixed martial artist

- Born: November 27, 1980 (age 45); La Porte, Indiana, U.S.
- Other names: Bad Boy
- Height: 6 ft 0 in (1.83 m)
- Weight: 170 lb (77 kg; 12 st)
- Division: Lightweight; Welterweight; Middleweight; Light Heavyweight; Heavyweight
- Reach: 73 in (185 cm)
- Stance: Southpaw
- Fighting out of: Phuket, Thailand
- Team: Tiger Muay Thai; Kimekai / ESS Performance
- Wrestling: NCAA Division I Wrestling
- Years active: 2000–2016

Mixed martial arts record
- Total: 71
- Wins: 51
- By knockout: 17
- By submission: 17
- By decision: 17
- Losses: 18
- By knockout: 2
- By submission: 8
- By decision: 8
- Draws: 1
- No contests: 1

Other information
- University: Eastern Illinois University
- Mixed martial arts record from Sherdog

Brian Ebersole (born November 27, 1980) is an American retired mixed martial artist who competed in the UFC's Welterweight division, and holds a record of 5–3 with the organization. In addition to the UFC, Ebersole has competed in Shooto, Strikeforce, the San Jose Razorclaws of the IFL and King of the Cage. Ebersole retired after having 71 professional MMA fights between 2000 and 2016.

== Background ==
Ebersole grew up in Bradley, Illinois. His grandfather started the Bradley-Bourbonnais Youth Wrestling Club in Illinois which served as Ebersole's introduction to amateur wrestling. He began wrestling when he was in kindergarten, was a standout wrestler in middle and high school and earned academic and athletic scholarships to Eastern Illinois University (EIU). He started training with Matt Hughes off and on during his time at EIU, which served as his introduction to mixed martial arts.

In November 2000 Ebersole was arrested following a fight with a Southern Illinois University hockey player. Although the charges were later dropped, Ebersole lost his wrestling scholarship as a result and dropped out of college soon after. Ebersole was a great student, but lost motivation to continue with his education as he could no longer wrestle, leaving with a year's worth of classes not finished. After leaving EIU Ebersole worked on a pig farm before eventually moving to California to train at American Kickboxing Academy (AKA) with Jon Fitch and Bob Cook.

Ebersole maintains a global training schedule, holding camps worldwide. He is Head Coach at Tiger Muay Thai in Phuket and also trains at ESS Performance in Melbourne, Australia.

Ebersole is known among MMA fans for his odd manscaping habits, having his chest hair groomed into designs such as arrows, stars, and even the Tapout logo at UFC 140.

Ebersole is currently the head wrestling coach at his alma mater, Bradley-Bourbonnais Community High School.

== Mixed martial arts career ==
=== Early career ===
In 2006, Ebersole was living in California, he worked in construction and was also working part-time as a bartender as well as fighting professionally. He claims that the inability to maintain fighting as a full-time profession affected his performances in the cage. In September of that year he took a fight against Shannon Ritch, winning the fight by submission. But the California State Athletic Commission (CSAC) claimed that he and Ritch had worked the fight, and that despite dominating the bout, Ebersole had helped keep Ritch in the fight for longer than he otherwise would have been able to. The CSAC overturned his victory to a no contest and suspended Ebersole. Because of this and the lack of overall MMA opportunities for Ebersole in the US, he decided to pick up and move to Australia, where he had an impressive run on the regional circuit, running up a record of 12 wins and 3 losses over five years.

In 2007, Ebersole was on a trip in the United States to say goodbye to friends and family before setting up permanent residence in Australia. While there he decided to take a short notice fight for the IFL against Alex Schoenauer. Not only did he lose the fight via split decision, but he failed his post-fight drug test for marijuana. Ebersole claimed he had eaten marijuana brownies before taking the fight, and didn't have time to make sure they cleared his system. This resulted in his second suspension by the CSAC, and reinforced his belief in the necessity of his move to Australia to further his fighting career.

=== Ultimate Fighting Championship ===
Ebersole made his UFC debut against Chris Lytle at UFC 127, replacing an injured Carlos Condit. Ebersole won via unanimous decision using unorthodox strikes and ground control in a bout that earned Fight of the Night honors.

In his second UFC fight, Ebersole faced veteran Dennis Hallman on August 6, 2011, at UFC 133. He won the fight via TKO in the first round. Ebersole was also awarded an honorary "getting those horrifying shorts off TV as soon as possible" bonus by Dana White for defeating Hallman, who was wearing Speedos (Speedos have since been banned in the UFC).

Ebersole was expected to face Rory MacDonald on December 10, 2011, at UFC 140. However, McDonald pulled out of their fight due to injury. Ebersole instead faced Claude Patrick, where he won a close, back and forth match via split decision.

Ebersole fought TJ Waldburger on June 22, 2012, at UFC on FX 4 and won the fight via unanimous decision (29–28, 29–28, 29–28). After the bout Ebersole said that he may try to drop down to the lightweight division. If he moves down, it will be the fifth weight class in which he has competed.

Making a quick return to the Octagon less than a month later, Ebersole replaced an injured Claude Patrick and faced James Head on July 21, 2012, at UFC 149. Ebersole received his first UFC loss to Head via split decision snapping his eleven fight winning streak and receiving his first loss since September 2008.

Ebersole made his first appearance in over a year when he fought Rick Story at UFC 167 on November 16, 2013. He lost the fight via unanimous decision.

Ebersole next fought John Howard on September 27, 2014, at UFC 178. He won the fight via split decision.

Ebersole was expected to face Alan Jouban on June 6, 2015, at UFC Fight Night 68. However, Jouban pulled out of the fight in late March citing injury and was replaced by Omari Akhmedov. Ebersole lost the fight via TKO after he was unable to continue after the first round due to a knee injury sustained from a kick by Akhmedov. Ebersole announced his retirement after the fight.

=== Post-retirement ===
Ebersole would fight one more time, June 24, 2016, facing Steven Kennedy at Hex Fight Series 6. Kennedy won the main event by decision.

== Championships and awards ==
=== Mixed martial arts ===
- Ultimate Fighting Championship
  - Fight of the Night (One time)
  - UFC.com Awards
    - 2011: Ranked #2 Newcomer of the Year
- Cage Fighting Championship
  - Cage Fighting Championship Welterweight Championship (One time)

== Mixed martial arts record ==
Professional record breakdown
71 matches	51 wins	18 losses
By knockout	15	2
By submission	19	8
By decision	17	8
Draws	1	
No contests	1	

Res.	Record	Opponent	Method	Event	Date	Round	Time	Location	Notes
Loss	51–18–1 (1)	Steven Kennedy	Decision (unanimous)	Hex Fight Series 6	June 24, 2016	5	5:00	Melbourne, Australia	For the HFS Welterweight Championship.
Loss	51–17–1 (1)	Omari Akhmedov	TKO (knee injury)	UFC Fight Night: Boetsch vs. Henderson	June 6, 2015	1	5:00	New Orleans, Louisiana, United States	
Win	51–16–1 (1)	John Howard	Decision (split)	UFC 178	September 27, 2014	3	5:00	Las Vegas, Nevada, United States	
Loss	50–16–1 (1)	Rick Story	Decision (unanimous)	UFC 167	November 16, 2013	3	5:00	Las Vegas, Nevada, United States	
Loss	50–15–1 (1)	James Head	Decision (split)	UFC 149	July 21, 2012	3	5:00	Calgary, Alberta, Canada	
Win	50–14–1 (1)	TJ Waldburger	Decision (unanimous)	UFC on FX: Maynard vs. Guida	June 22, 2012	3	5:00	Atlantic City, New Jersey, United States	
Win	49–14–1 (1)	Claude Patrick	Decision (split)	UFC 140	December 10, 2011	3	5:00	Toronto, Ontario, Canada	
Win	48–14–1 (1)	Dennis Hallman	TKO (elbows)	UFC 133	August 6, 2011	1	4:28	Philadelphia, Pennsylvania, United States	
Win	47–14–1 (1)	Chris Lytle	Decision (unanimous)	UFC 127	February 27, 2011	3	5:00	Sydney, Australia	Fight of the Night.
Win	46–14–1 (1)	Hamish Robertson	TKO (punches)	LGIOP: Van Diemen's Caged Mayhem	January 29, 2011	1	N/A	Tasmania, Australia	
Win	45–14–1 (1)	Carlos Newton	Decision (unanimous)	Impact FC 1	July 10, 2010	3	5:00	Brisbane, Australia	
Win	44–14–1 (1)	Martin van Staden	Submission (inverted triangle choke)	Fight Force 5: Invasion	April 15, 2010	3	N/A	Johannesburg, South Africa	
Win	43–14–1 (1)	Ian James Schaffa	Submission (arm-triangle choke)	XMMA 1: Xtreme MMA	December 20, 2009	2	2:34	Sydney, Australia	
Win	42–14–1 (1)	Jai Bradney	Decision (unanimous)	CWA: Staunch Cage Wars	May 9, 2009	3	5:00	Queensland, Australia	
Win	41–14–1 (1)	Shannon Forrester	KO (cartwheel kick)	XFC: Return of the Hulk	March 14, 2009	1	N/A	Perth, Australia	
Win	40–14–1 (1)	Shane Nix	TKO (knee injury)	Cage Fighting Championships 6: Eliminator	November 7, 2008	3	3:29	Sydney, Australia	Won the CFC Welterweight Championship.
Loss	39–14–1 (1)	Héctor Lombard	TKO (submission to punches)	Cage Fighting Championships 5	September 12, 2008	4	1:56	Sydney, Australia	
Win	39–13–1 (1)	Wade Henderson	Submission (arm-triangle choke)	Cage Fighting Championships 4	May 23, 2008	1	1:25	Sydney, Australia	
Win	38–13–1 (1)	Dylan Andrews	TKO (punches)	Cage Fighting Championships 3	February 15, 2008	2	4:26	Sydney, Australia	
Win	37–13–1 (1)	Gordon Graff	Decision (unanimous)	KOTC: Perth	October 5, 2007	2	5:00	Perth, Australia	
Win	36–13–1 (1)	Jon Valuri	Decision (unanimous)	Shooto Australia: Superfight Australia 1	May 26, 2007	2	5:00	Perth, Australia	
Loss	35–13–1 (1)	Alex Schoenauer	Decision (split)	IFL: Los Angeles	March 17, 2007	3	4:00	Los Angeles, California, United States	Failed post fight drug test for marijuana.
Win	35–12–1 (1)	David Frendin	TKO (doctor stoppage)	XFC 13: Global Warfare	November 10, 2006	2	N/A	Queensland, Australia	
Loss	34–12–1 (1)	Kyle Noke	Decision (majority)	XFC 12: Oktoberfist	October 13, 2006	5	5:00	Australia	
NC	34–11–1 (1)	Shannon Ritch	NC (overturned)	FCP: Malice at Cow Palace	September 9, 2006	1	3:46	San Francisco, California, United States	Submission victory overturned.
Win	34–11–1	Andrew Varney	Decision (unanimous)	LOF 8: Legends of Fighting 8	July 28, 2006	3	5:00	Indianapolis, Indiana, United States	
Win	33–11–1	Matt Horwich	Decision (unanimous)	Strikeforce: Shamrock vs. Gracie	March 10, 2006	3	5:00	San Jose, California, United States	
Win	32–11–1	Alex Serdyukov	Decision (unanimous)	ICFO 1: Stockton	May 13, 2005	3	5:00	Stockton, California, United States	
Win	31–11–1	Andy Foster	Decision (unanimous)	FT 6: Full Throttle 6	February 11, 2005	3	5:00	Atlanta, Georgia, United States	
Loss	30–11–1	Masanori Suda	Submission (rear-naked choke)	Shooto: 1/29 in Korakuen Hall	January 29, 2005	3	2:59	Tokyo, Japan	
Win	30–10–1	Gordon Kalimic	Submission (arm-triangle choke)	MMA Mexico: Day 1	December 17, 2004	1	N/A	Ciudad Juárez, Mexico	
Loss	29–10–1	John Renken	Decision (unanimous)	FFC 12: Freestyle Fighting Championships 12	September 24, 2004	3	5:00	Indiana, United States	
Win	29–9–1	Nick Thompson	TKO (punches)	FFC 12: Freestyle Fighting Championships 12	September 24, 2004	1	N/A	Indiana, United States	
Loss	28–9–1	Ed Herman	Submission (triangle choke)	SF 5: Stadium	August 28, 2004	2	N/A	Gresham, Oregon, United States	
Win	28–8–1	Alexei Veselovzorov	TKO (punches)	Euphoria: Russia vs USA	March 13, 2004	3	2:26	Atlantic City, New Jersey, United States	
Win	27–8–1	Todd Carney	Decision (unanimous)	KOTR: King of the Rockies 1	January 3, 2004	4	5:00	Fort Collins, Colorado, United States	
Win	26–8–1	Shane Tate	TKO (punches)	EP: XXXtreme Impact	December 28, 2003	1	1:38	Tijuana, Mexico	
Win	25–8–1	Emanuel Newton	TKO (punches)	CFM: Ultimate Fighting Mexico	November 15, 2003	4	N/A	Monterrey, Mexico	
Draw	24–8–1	Brad Lynde	Draw	FCC 12: Freestyle Combat Challenge 12	October 18, 2003	2	5:00	Racine, Wisconsin, United States	
Win	24–8	Chris Fontaine	Decision (unanimous)	CFM: Octogono Extremo	September 27, 2003	3	4:00	Monterrey, Mexico	
Loss	23–8	Tony Fryklund	Submission (ankle lock)	Dangerzone 17: Dakota Destruction	April 12, 2003	2	4:37	New Town, North Dakota, United States	
Win	23–7	David Harris	Decision (unanimous)	CFM: Cage Fighting Monterrey	January 30, 2003	3	5:00	Monterrey, Mexico	
Win	22–7	Shannon Ritch	TKO (punch)	CFM: Ultimate Fighting	October 26, 2002	1	3:40	Monterrey, Mexico	
Loss	21–7	Bret Bergmark	Decision (split)	UA 4: King of the Mountain	September 28, 2002	3	5:00	Auberry, California, United States	
Win	21–6	Tom Martini	TKO (submission to punches)	UW: Minnesota	September 7, 2002	1	N/A	Fridley, Minnesota, United States	
Win	20–6	Rene Hernandez	Submission (arm-triangle choke)	MMA: Cuando Hierve la Sangre	August 31, 2002	2	N/A	Monterrey, Mexico	
Win	19–6	Shane Schartzer	Submission (kimura)	MMA: Cuando Hierve la Sangre	August 31, 2002	1	N/A	Monterrey, Mexico	
Win	18–6	Joel Blanton	TKO (punches)	UW: Minnesota	August 24, 2002	1	4:00	Minneapolis, Minnesota, United States	
Win	17–6	Dan Hart	Technical Submission (guillotine choke)	CR 4: Cage Rage 4	August 17, 2002	1	1:48	Kokomo, Indiana, United States	
Win	16–6	Nathan McCabe	TKO (punches)	RFC 1: The Beginning	July 13, 2002	1	2:15	Las Vegas, Nevada, United States	
Win	15–6	Desmond Peterson	TKO (submission to punches)	BEFC 2: Big Easy Fighting 2	June 28, 2002	1	N/A	New Orleans, Louisiana, United States	
Win	14–6	Rich Guerin	Decision	CLM 2: Combate Libre Mexico 2	April 26, 2002	N/A	N/A	Mexico	
Win	13–6	Edwin Aguilar	Submission (rear-naked choke)	CLM 2: Combate Libre Mexico 2	April 26, 2002	N/A	N/A	Mexico	
Win	12–6	Chris Gates	Submission (armbar)	CLM 2: Combate Libre Mexico 2	April 26, 2002	N/A	N/A	Mexico	
Loss	11–6	Jay Massey	Submission (rear-naked choke)	TCC: Battle of the Badges	April 13, 2002	1	N/A	Hammond, Indiana, United States	
Win	11–5	Jamie Schell	KO (punch)	UW: Horn vs Wikan	March 2, 2002	2	0:43	Minnesota, United States	
Win	10–5	Josh Mueller	Submission (rear-naked choke)	UW: Battle for the Belts	March 2, 2002	1	0:37	Minnesota, United States	
Loss	9–5	Kerry Schall	Submission (kneebar)	UW: Battle for the Belts	December 8, 2001	1	3:15	Fridley, Minnesota, United States	
Win	9–4	Mark Lowry	Submission (arm-triangle choke)	UW: Battle for the Belts	December 8, 2001	1	3:22	Fridley, Minnesota, United States	
Loss	8–4	Stephan Bonnar	Submission (guillotine choke)	IHC 3: Exodus	November 10, 2001	1	0:51	Hammond, Indiana, United States	Light Heavyweight bout.
Win	8–3	Eric Zent	Submission (choke)	CR 3: Cage Rage 3	October 20, 2001	2	1:00	Kokomo, Indiana, United States	
Win	7–3	Ed Meyers	Submission (choke)	CR 3: Cage Rage 3	October 20, 2001	1	3:36	Kokomo, Indiana, United States	
Loss	6–3	Adrian Serrano	Submission (rear-naked choke)	TCC: Total Combat Challenge	September 29, 2001	1	5:10	Hammond, Indiana, United States	
Win	6–2	Darrell Smith	Submission (armbar)	FFCC: Finke's Full Contact Challenge	May 21, 2001	2	N/A	Highland, Indiana, United States	
Win	5–2	Josh Hoover	TKO (submission to slam)	FFCC: Finke's Full Contact Challenge	May 21, 2001	3	N/A	Highland, Indiana, United States	
Win	4–2	Eddie Sanchez	Decision (unanimous)	FFCC: Finke's Full Contact Challenge	April 30, 2001	2	5:00	Highland, Indiana, United States	
Loss	3–2	Jay Massey	Submission (armbar)	MMA: Invitational 4	November 18, 2000	1	1:22	Hammond, Indiana, United States	
Win	3–1	Jeremy Morrison	Submission (armbar)	FFCC: Finke's Full Contact Challenge	July 28, 2000	1	N/A	Highland, Indiana, United States	
Win	2–1	Enrique Lowe	Submission (armbar)	FFCC: Finke's Full Contact Challenge	June 16, 2000	1	3:50	Highland, Indiana, United States	
Win	1–1	Jose Garcia	Submission (rear-naked choke)	TCC: Total Combat Challenge	June 10, 2000	1	N/A	Chicago, Illinois, United States	
Loss	0–1	Chris Albandia	Decision	TCC: Total Combat Challenge	February 24, 2000	1	10:00	Chicago, Illinois, United States	

== See also ==
- List of current UFC fighters
- List of male mixed martial artists
