= Ingersoll District Collegiate Institute =

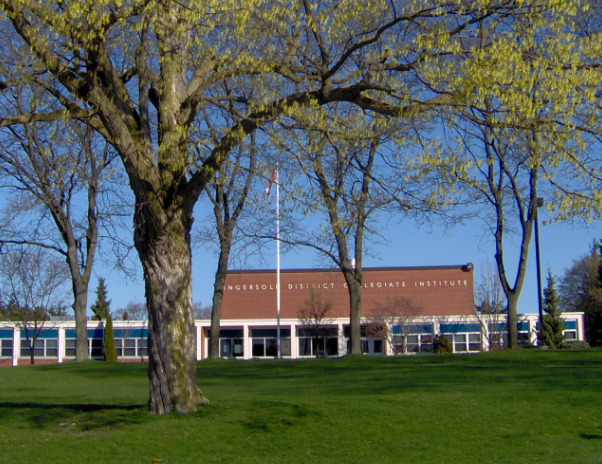

Location
- 37 Alma Street; Ingersoll, Ontario, N5C 1N1; Canada; 43.0453°N 80.8890°W

Information
- School type: Public High School
- Motto: Latin: Emitte Luciem ("To Emit Light")
- Founded: 1932
- School board: Thames Valley District School Board
- Superintendent: Barb Sonier
- Area trustee: Dave Cripps
- School number: 2160
- Principal: Duivistein
- Grades: 9–12
- Enrollment: 1039 (31 October 2007)
- Language: English
- Area: Ingersoll Area
- Colours: Blue and White
- Mascot: "Ace" (eagle)
- Team name: Blue Bombers
- Website: www.tvdsb.on.ca/idci

Ingersoll District Collegiate Institute (aka I.D.C.I.) is a public high school in Ingersoll, Ontario. As the only high school in Ingersoll, it also serves the village of Thamesford, and the rural areas surrounding both communities It is in the Thames Valley District School Board (TVDSB). It is located in the north end of the town on Alma street. Historian and educator J.C. Herbert was a long-term principal of the school, where he has an award named after him.

== Notable alumni ==
- Mark Hominick, MMA fighter
- Ella Shelton, PWHL New York Defence
- Jeremy Hansen, astronaut
- Robert Budreau, filmmaker

== See also ==
- Education in Ontario
- List of secondary schools in Ontario
