= Mark Hominick =

Canadian mixed martial arts fighter

- Born: July 22, 1982 (age 44); Thamesford, Ontario, Canada
- Other names: The Machine
- Height: 5 ft 8 in (1.73 m)
- Weight: 145 lb (66 kg; 10.4 st)
- Division: Featherweight (2005–2012); Lightweight (2002–2005, 2006)
- Reach: 68 1/2 in (174 cm)
- Style: Boxing, Kickboxing, Submission Wrestling
- Fighting out of: London, Ontario, Canada
- Team: Adrenaline Training Center
- Years active: 2002–2012 (MMA)

Kickboxing record
- Total: 21
- Wins: 21
- Losses: 0

Mixed martial arts record
- Total: 32
- Wins: 20
- By knockout: 9
- By submission: 7
- By decision: 4
- Losses: 12
- By knockout: 3
- By submission: 5
- By decision: 4

Other information
- Notable school: Ingersoll District Collegiate Institute
- Website: Official UFC Profile
- Mixed martial arts record from Sherdog

Mark Hominick (born July 22, 1982) is a Canadian retired mixed martial artist who competed in the Featherweight division for the Ultimate Fighting Championship where he was the inaugural Featherweight title challenger, the WEC, and Affliction. He is also a former TKO Featherweight Champion. He was well known for his outstanding boxing skills and very accurate punching techniques, often utilizing the jab.

== Background ==
As a teen he attended Ingersoll District Collegiate Institute. He was trained by the late MMA striking coach Shawn Tompkins with Sam Stout at The Adrenaline Training Center in London, Ontario, where he also works as an instructor. Nowadays he owns the training center along with Stout and Chris Horodecki.

== Mixed martial arts career ==
=== Ultimate Fighting Championship ===
Hominick made his UFC debut against former top lightweight Yves Edwards at UFC 58. Hominick defeated Edwards via triangle choke in the second round.

Hominick next fought BJJ black belt Jorge Gurgel at UFC Ultimate Fight Night 5. He won by unanimous decision.

=== World Extreme Cagefighting ===
Hominick lost his first two WEC bouts back to back with first round submission losses to Rani Yahya and Josh Grispi at WEC 28 and WEC 32 respectively.

He was scheduled to fight Deividas Taurosevičius on October 10, 2009 at WEC 43., but was forced to withdraw due to an injury and was replaced by Javier Vazquez.

Hominick was scheduled to face Yves Jabouin on January 10, 2010 at WEC 46, but Jabouin was forced off the card with an injury. Hominick instead faced WEC newcomer Bryan Caraway, winning via first round submission.

The fight with Yves Jabouin eventually took place on June 20, 2010 at WEC 49. Hominick won via TKO in the second round. They both won a Sherdog award for best round of 2010. This fight earned him a $10,000 Fight of the Night award.

Hominick faced Leonard Garcia on September 30, 2010 at WEC 51. He won the fight via split decision.

=== Return to UFC ===
On October 28, 2010, World Extreme Cagefighting merged with the Ultimate Fighting Championship. As part of the merger, all WEC fighters were transferred to the UFC.

Hominick faced former training partner, George Roop on January 22, 2011 at UFC Fight Night 23 in a top contender bout. Hominick stopped Roop via punches in the first round.

Hominick faced UFC Featherweight Champion José Aldo on April 30, 2011 at UFC 129, where he lost via unanimous decision (48–45, 48–46, and 49–46) in a bout that earned them a $129,000 Fight of the Night bonus award.

Hominick faced Chan Sung Jung on December 10, 2011 at UFC 140. Hominick attempted to recklessly attack Jung immediately after touching gloves and was dropped with a counter right. Jung followed up with punches until Hominick went limp and the referee brought an end to the fight, tying one of the fastest KOs in the UFC.

Hominick faced Eddie Yagin on April 21, 2012 at UFC 145. Hominick lost the fight via split decision, in a bout that earned both participants Fight of the Night honors.

Hominick faced Pablo Garza on November 17, 2012 at UFC 154. He lost the fight by unanimous decision.

After the loss at UFC 154, Hominick announced his retirement on December 11, 2012, stating "I truly got to live my passion and follow my dreams by competing in mixed martial arts, especially under the Zuffa banner, but UFC 154, that's the last fight I'll be in the octagon, as I'm retiring and looking to move on to the next phase of my career."

== Personal life ==
Hominick attended I.D.C.I school in Ingersoll, Ontario. Hominick married in December 2009. They have two children.

Mark Hominick has been involved with several other UFC fighters (Sean Pierson, Sam Stout, and Matt Mitrione) as part of a Toronto area anti-bullying program.

== Championships and achievements ==
=== Mixed martial arts ===
- TKO Major League MMA
  - TKO Major League Featherweight Championship
  - Three successful title defenses
- Ultimate Fighting Championship
  - Fight of the Night (Two times) vs. José Aldo and Eddie Yagin
  - UFC Encyclopedia Awards
    - Submission of the Night (One time) vs. Yves Edwards
  - UFC.com Awards
    - 2006: Ranked #7 Submission of the Year vs. Yves Edwards
    - 2012: Ranked #3 Fight of the Year vs. Eddie Yagin
- World Extreme Cagefighting
  - Fight of the Night (One time) vs. Yves Jabouin
- Universal Combat Challenge
  - Canadian Super-Lightweight Championship
  - Four successful title defenses
- Sherdog
  - 2010 Round of the Year (2nd round in fight against Yves Jabouin)

=== Kickboxing ===
- International Sport Karate Association
  - ISKA Canadian Super Welterweight Championship
- International Kickboxing Federation
  - IKF North American Super Welterweight Championship

== Mixed martial arts record ==
Professional record breakdown
32 matches	20 wins	12 losses
By knockout	9	3
By submission	7	5
By decision	4	4

Res.	Record	Opponent	Method	Event	Date	Round	Time	Location	Notes
Loss	20–12	Pablo Garza	Decision (unanimous)	UFC 154	November 17, 2012	3	5:00	Montreal, Quebec, Canada	
Loss	20–11	Eddie Yagin	Decision (split)	UFC 145	April 21, 2012	3	5:00	Atlanta, Georgia, United States	Fight of the Night.
Loss	20–10	Jung Chan-sung	KO (punches)	UFC 140	December 10, 2011	1	0:07	Toronto, Ontario, Canada	
Loss	20–9	José Aldo	Decision (unanimous)	UFC 129	April 30, 2011	5	5:00	Toronto, Ontario, Canada	For the UFC Featherweight Championship. Fight of the Night.
Win	20–8	George Roop	TKO (punches)	UFC: Fight for the Troops 2	January 22, 2011	1	1:28	Fort Hood, Texas, United States	UFC Featherweight title eliminator.
Win	19–8	Leonard Garcia	Decision (split)	WEC 51	September 30, 2010	3	5:00	Broomfield, Colorado, United States	
Win	18–8	Yves Jabouin	TKO (punches)	WEC 49	June 20, 2010	2	3:21	Edmonton, Alberta, Canada	Fight of the Night.
Win	17–8	Bryan Caraway	Submission (triangle armbar)	WEC 46	January 10, 2010	1	3:48	Sacramento, California, United States	
Win	16–8	Savant Young	Submission (armbar)	Affliction: Banned	July 19, 2008	2	4:25	Anaheim, California, United States	
Loss	15–8	Josh Grispi	Submission (rear-naked choke)	WEC 32: Condit vs. Prater	February 13, 2008	1	2:55	Rio Rancho, New Mexico, United States	
Win	15–7	Danny Martinez	Decision (unanimous)	TKO 31: Young Guns	December 14, 2007	3	5:00	Montreal, Quebec, Canada	
Win	14–7	Ben Greer	KO (punches)	TKO 30: Apocalypse	September 28, 2007	1	1:14	Montreal, Quebec, Canada	
Loss	13–7	Rani Yahya	Submission (rear-naked choke)	WEC 28	June 3, 2007	1	1:19	Las Vegas, Nevada, United States	
Loss	13–6	Hatsu Hioki	Decision (majority)	TKO 28: Inevitable	February 9, 2007	5	5:00	Montreal, Quebec, Canada	For TKO Major League Featherweight Championship.
Win	13–5	Doug Edwards	Submission (rear-naked choke)	ROF 27: Collision Course	December 9, 2006	2	4:08	Denver, Colorado, United States	
Win	12–5	Samuel Guillet	Decision (unanimous)	TKO 27: Reincarnation	September 29, 2006	3	5:00	Montreal, Quebec, Canada	
Win	11–5	Jorge Gurgel	Decision (unanimous)	UFC Fight Night 5	June 28, 2006	3	5:00	Las Vegas, Nevada, United States	
Loss	10–5	Hatsu Hioki	Technical Submission (triangle choke)	TKO 25: Confrontation	May 5, 2006	2	5:00	Montreal, Quebec, Canada	Lost the TKO Major League Featherweight Championship.
Win	10–4	Yves Edwards	Submission (triangle armbar)	UFC 58: USA vs. Canada	March 4, 2006	2	1:52	Las Vegas, Nevada, United States	
Win	9–4	Naoji Fujimoto	Technical Submission (rear-naked choke)	TKO 24: Eruption	January 28, 2006	3	2:23	Laval, Quebec, Canada	Defended the TKO World Super Lightweight Championship.
Win	8–4	Ryan Diaz	TKO (punches)	TKO 22: Lionheart	September 30, 2005	3	4:25	Montreal, Quebec, Canada	Defended the TKO World Super Lightweight Championship.
Win	7–4	Stephane Vigneault	Submission (punches)	TKO 20: Champion vs Champion	April 2, 2005	1	4:35	Montreal, Quebec, Canada	Promoted to and defended the TKO World Super Lightweight Championship.
Win	6–4	Shane Rice	TKO (leg kicks and punch)	TKO 19: Rage	January 29, 2005	1	4:16	Montreal, Quebec, Canada	Won the TKO Canadian Super Lightweight Championship.
Loss	5–4	Shane Rice	Submission (rear-naked choke)	TKO 17: Revenge	September 25, 2004	1	1:46	Victoriaville, Quebec, Canada	Lost the TKO Canadian Super-Lightweight Title.
Win	5–3	David Guigui	TKO (punches)	TKO 15: Unstoppable	February 28, 2004	2	4:26	Montreal, Quebec, Canada	Defended the Canadian Super-Lightweight Title.
Win	4–3	Ryan Diaz	TKO (punches)	TKO 13: Ultimate Rush	September 6, 2003	2	0:42	Montreal, Quebec, Canada	Defended the Canadian Super-Lightweight Title.
Loss	3–3	Tommy Lee	TKO (slam)	Extreme Challenge 51	August 2, 2003	1	0:18	St. Charles, Illinois, United States	
Loss	3–2	Mike Brown	Submission (heel hook)	TFC 8: Hell Raiser	June 6, 2003	3	4:27	Toledo, Ohio, United States	
Loss	3–1	Stephen Palling	TKO (doctor stoppage)	SuperBrawl 29	May 9, 2003	1	0:16	Honolulu, Hawaii, United States	
Win	3–0	Stephane Laliberte	Submission (armbar)	UCC 12: Adrenaline	January 25, 2003	1	4:43	Montreal, Quebec, Canada	Defended the Canadian Super-Lightweight Title.
Win	2–0	Steve Claveau	Submission (punches)	UCC 11: The Next Level	October 11, 2002	2	3:24	Montreal, Quebec, Canada	Defended the Canadian Super-Lightweight Title.
Win	1–0	Richard Nancoo	TKO (punches)	UCC 10: Battle for the Belts 2002	June 15, 2002	3	3:23	Hull, Quebec, Canada	Won the Canadian Super-Lightweight Title.
