= John Makdessi =

Canadian mixed martial artist

- Born: May 3, 1985 (age 41); Halifax, Nova Scotia, Canada
- Other names: The Bull
- Height: 5 ft 8 in (1.73 m)
- Weight: 155 lb (70 kg; 11.1 st)
- Division: Lightweight
- Reach: 68 in (173 cm)
- Fighting out of: Laval, Quebec, Canada
- Team: Roufusport (2018–); Tristar Gym; Team Bull; Thai long Muay Thai
- Rank: Black belt in Shotokan Karate
- Years active: 2008–present

Mixed martial arts record
- Total: 27
- Wins: 18
- By knockout: 9
- By decision: 9
- Losses: 9
- By knockout: 2
- By submission: 1
- By decision: 6

Other information
- Website: www.johnmakdessi.com
- Mixed martial arts record from Sherdog

John Makdessi (born May 3, 1985) is a Canadian professional mixed martial artist who competes in the Lightweight division and competed in the Ultimate Fighting Championship.

== Background ==
Makdessi was born in Halifax, Nova Scotia, Canada on May 3, 1985, and is a first-generation Lebanese-Canadian born to Lebanese parents. His martial arts training started with Tae Kwon Do at the age of six. When Makdessi started high school, his dojo closed, and he could no longer continue. Towards the end of high school at the age of 19, he found a karate dojo where he learned Shotokan. Makdessi spent a lot of his time competing in kickboxing tournaments, and in 2006 won a gold medal in the USKBA. After going 22–0 in kickboxing, Makdessi began training in mixed martial arts.

== Mixed martial arts career ==
=== Early career ===
Makdessi made his professional MMA debut in 2008 and compiled an undefeated record of 7-0 before being signed by the UFC.

=== Ultimate Fighting Championship ===
Makdessi signed with the UFC in 2010. He made his promotional debut on December 11, 2010, at UFC 124 in Montreal, winning a dominant (30-27, 30–27, 30–26) decision over Pat Audinwood.

Makdessi was expected to face TUF 12 winner Jonathan Brookins on April 30, 2011, at UFC 129. Brookins pulled out of the bout and was replaced by another TUF 12 alum in Kyle Watson, who Makdessi knocked out with a spinning backfist in the third round.

Makdessi was expected to face Paul Taylor on August 14, 2011, at UFC on Versus 5, but withdrew due to injury.

Makdessi suffered the first loss of his career to Dennis Hallman on December 10, 2011, at UFC 140, via first-round rear naked choke.

Makdessi lost a unanimous decision to fellow striker Anthony Njokuani on April 21, 2012, at UFC 145.

Makdessi next defeated Sam Stout by unanimous decision on November 17, 2012, at UFC 154.

Makdessi then fought Daron Cruickshank at UFC 158 on March 16, 2013. He won the fight via unanimous decision.

Makdessi was expected to face Edson Barboza on July 6, 2013, at UFC 162. Makdessi pulled out of the bout citing an injury and was replaced by Rafaello Oliveira.

Makdessi knocked out Renée Forte in the first round on September 21, 2013, at UFC 165.

Makdessi lost a unanimous decision to Alan Patrick at UFC 169 on February 1, 2014.

Makdessi was expected to face Abel Trujillo on April 25, 2015, at UFC 186. Trujillo pulled out of the fight citing an injury, and was replaced on April 1 by promotional newcomer Shane Campbell. Makdessi won the fight via TKO in the first round.

Less than a month after his win, Makdessi returned to the octagon as a replacement for injured Khabib Nurmagomedov against Donald Cerrone on May 23, 2015, at UFC 187. Makdessi lost the fight via TKO after his jaw was broken with a head kick in the second round.

Makdessi faced Yancy Medeiros on December 12, 2015, at UFC 194. He lost the fight by split decision.

Makdessi next faced Mehdi Baghdad on July 7, 2016, at UFC Fight Night 90. He was awarded a split decision victory.

Makdessi faced Lando Vannata on December 10, 2016, at UFC 206. He lost the fight via knockout in the first round.

Makdessi was expected to face Sage Northcutt on July 29, 2017, at UFC 214. In turn, the fight was canceled on July 14 as both fighters cited injuries.

Makdessi faced Abel Trujillo on December 16, 2017, at UFC on Fox 26. He won the fight by unanimous decision.

Makdessi faced Ross Pearson on July 28, 2018, at UFC on Fox 30. He won the fight by unanimous decision. This fight earned him the Fight of the Night award.

Makdessi was expected to face Carlos Diego Ferreira on December 8, 2018, at UFC 231. However, on November 28, 2018, it was reported that Makdessi was removed from the card and replaced by Jesse Ronson.

Makdessi was expected to face Nasrat Haqparast on March 23, 2019, at UFC Fight Night 148. However, on March 13, 2019, it was reported that Haqparast was pulled from the bout due to injury and was replaced by Jesus Pinedo. Makdessi won the fight via unanimous decision.

Makdessi was scheduled to face Devonte Smith on August 17, 2019, at UFC 241. However, it was reported on 30 July 2019 that Makdessi was forced to withdraw for undisclosed reason.

Makdessi faced Francisco Trinaldo on March 14, 2020, at UFC Fight Night 170. He lost the fight via unanimous decision.

Makdessi faced Ignacio Bahamondes on April 10, 2021, at UFC on ABC 2. At the weigh-ins, Ignacio Bahamondes weighed in at 156.75 pounds, 0.75 pound over the lightweight non-title fight limit. The bout proceeded at a catchweight and Bahamondes was fined 20% of his individual purse, which went to Makdessi. Makdessi won the bout via split decision.

Makdessi faced Nasrat Haqparast on September 3, 2022, at UFC Fight Night 209. He lost the fight via unanimous decision.

Makdessi faced Jamie Mullarkey on September 10, 2023, at UFC 293. He lost the fight via unanimous decision.

In October 2023, Makdessi was released by UFC.

==== Global Fight League ====
On December 11, 2024, it was announced that Makdessi was signed by Global Fight League. However, in April 2025, it was reported that all GFL events were cancelled indefinitely.

== Boxing ==
Makdessi was scheduled to face Diego Sanchez in a boxing bout on April 12, 2025 at ICS Mania 1. However, the event was cancelled due to unfulfilled contractual obligations.

Makdessi made his professional boxing debut against Felipe Chavez on January 9, 2026 at Burque Brawl. He won by TKO in the second round.

== Championships and accomplishments ==
=== Mixed martial arts ===
- Ultimate Fighting Championship
  - Fight of the Night (One time) vs. Ross Pearson

== Fear the Fighter sponsorship controversy ==
Makdessi is listed as the president of the MMA apparel brand Fear the Fighter, which has sponsored several MMA and UFC fighters. Since 2014, a number of fighters have come forward with complaints, alleging that Fear the Fighter had failed to pay their respective sponsorship fees. Akira Corassani, Tim Elliott, John Dodson, Georgi Karakhanyan, and Gegard Mousasi have publicly made such allegations. In April 2015, Mousasi's management team stated that they had filed a lawsuit against Makdessi and Fear the Fighter due to their alleged failure to pay the outstanding debt owed to Mousasi.

== Championships and accomplishments ==
- Ultimate Fighting Championship
  - UFC.com Awards
    - 2011: Ranked #3 Knockout of the Year vs. Kyle Watson

== Mixed martial arts record ==
Professional record breakdown
27 matches	18 wins	9 losses
By knockout	9	2
By submission	0	1
By decision	9	6

Res.	Record	Opponent	Method	Event	Date	Round	Time	Location	Notes
Loss	18–9	Jamie Mullarkey	Decision (unanimous)	UFC 293	September 10, 2023	3	5:00	Sydney, Australia	
Loss	18–8	Nasrat Haqparast	Decision (unanimous)	UFC Fight Night: Gane vs. Tuivasa	September 3, 2022	3	5:00	Paris, France	
Win	18–7	Ignacio Bahamondes	Decision (split)	UFC on ABC: Vettori vs. Holland	April 10, 2021	3	5:00	Las Vegas, Nevada, United States	Catchweight (156.75 lb) bout; Bahamondes missed weight.
Loss	17–7	Francisco Trinaldo	Decision (unanimous)	UFC Fight Night: Lee vs. Oliveira	March 14, 2020	3	5:00	Brasília, Brazil	
Win	17–6	Jesus Pinedo	Decision (unanimous)	UFC Fight Night: Thompson vs. Pettis	March 23, 2019	3	5:00	Nashville, Tennessee, United States	
Win	16–6	Ross Pearson	Decision (unanimous)	UFC on Fox: Alvarez vs. Poirier 2	July 28, 2018	3	5:00	Calgary, Alberta, Canada	Fight of the Night.
Win	15–6	Abel Trujillo	Decision (unanimous)	UFC on Fox: Lawler vs. dos Anjos	December 16, 2017	3	5:00	Winnipeg, Manitoba, Canada	
Loss	14–6	Lando Vannata	KO (wheel kick)	UFC 206	December 10, 2016	1	1:40	Toronto, Ontario, Canada	
Win	14–5	Mehdi Baghdad	Decision (split)	UFC Fight Night: dos Anjos vs. Alvarez	July 7, 2016	3	5:00	Las Vegas, Nevada, United States	
Loss	13–5	Yancy Medeiros	Decision (split)	UFC 194	December 12, 2015	3	5:00	Las Vegas, Nevada, United States	
Loss	13–4	Donald Cerrone	TKO (head kick)	UFC 187	May 23, 2015	2	4:44	Las Vegas, Nevada, United States	
Win	13–3	Shane Campbell	TKO (punches)	UFC 186	April 25, 2015	1	4:53	Montreal, Quebec, Canada	Catchweight (160 lb) bout.
Loss	12–3	Alan Patrick	Decision (unanimous)	UFC 169	February 1, 2014	3	5:00	Newark, New Jersey, United States	
Win	12–2	Renée Forte	KO (punches)	UFC 165	September 21, 2013	1	2:01	Toronto, Ontario, Canada	
Win	11–2	Daron Cruickshank	Decision (unanimous)	UFC 158	March 16, 2013	3	5:00	Montreal, Quebec, Canada	
Win	10–2	Sam Stout	Decision (unanimous)	UFC 154	November 17, 2012	3	5:00	Montreal, Quebec, Canada	
Loss	9–2	Anthony Njokuani	Decision (unanimous)	UFC 145	April 21, 2012	3	5:00	Atlanta, Georgia, United States	Catchweight (158 lb) bout; Makdessi missed weight.
Loss	9–1	Dennis Hallman	Submission (rear-naked choke)	UFC 140	December 10, 2011	1	2:58	Toronto, Ontario, Canada	Catchweight (158.5 lb) bout; Hallman missed weight.
Win	9–0	Kyle Watson	KO (spinning back fist)	UFC 129	April 30, 2011	3	1:27	Toronto, Ontario, Canada	
Win	8–0	Pat Audinwood	Decision (unanimous)	UFC 124	December 11, 2010	3	5:00	Montreal, Quebec, Canada	
Win	7–0	Bendy Casimir	Decision (unanimous)	Mixed Fight League 3	September 25, 2010	3	5:00	Montreal, Quebec, Canada	Catchweight (159 lb) bout; Makdessi missed weight.
Win	6–0	Lindsey Hawkes	TKO (punches)	Canadian Fighting Championship 4	February 26, 2010	2	4:59	Winnipeg, Manitoba, Canada	
Win	5–0	Brandon McArthur	TKO (doctor stoppage)	Ringside MMA: Rivalry	November 14, 2009	1	5:00	Drummondville, Quebec, Canada	
Win	4–0	Iraj Hadin	TKO (punches)	Ringside MMA: Rage Fighting	August 22, 2009	2	4:48	Montreal, Quebec, Canada	
Win	3–0	Amir Uddin	TKO (punches)	XMMA 7: Inferno	February 27, 2009	2	3:06	Montreal, Quebec, Canada	
Win	2–0	Dan Dechaine	TKO (punches)	XMMA 6: House of Pain	November 8, 2008	1	1:48	Montreal, Quebec, Canada	
Win	1–0	Todd Westcott	TKO (punches)	XMMA 5: It's Crow Time	September 13, 2008	1	3:06	Montreal, Quebec, Canada	

== See also ==
- List of male mixed martial artists
- List of Canadian UFC fighters
