= UFC 140 =

UFC mixed martial arts event in 2011

UFC 140: Jones vs. Machida
- The poster for UFC 140: Jones vs. Machida
- Promotion: Ultimate Fighting Championship
- Date: December 10, 2011
- Venue: Air Canada Centre
- City: Toronto, Ontario, Canada
- Attendance: 18,303
- Total gate: $3,900,000

Event chronology
The Ultimate Fighter: Team Bisping vs. Team Miller Finale	UFC 140: Jones vs. Machida	UFC 141: Lesnar vs. Overeem

UFC 140: Jones vs. Machida was a mixed martial arts event held by the Ultimate Fighting Championship on December 10, 2011, at the Air Canada Centre in Toronto, Ontario, Canada. It was the penultimate event for the UFC in 2011. The event featured eight bouts televised internationally, seven preliminary bouts aired on cable in the United States and Canada, and three preliminary bouts streamed live on Facebook.

In the co-main event, Frank Mir, who was the first man to knock out Antônio Rodrigo Nogueira at UFC 92, became the first man to submit Nogueira. Mir accomplished the feat with a kimura that ultimately broke Nogueira's arm. In the main event, Lyoto Machida also suffered his first submission loss at the hands of Jon Jones. In doing so, Jones retained the UFC Light Heavyweight Championship title.

== Background ==
A bout between Lyoto Machida and Phil Davis was initially announced by UFC President, Dana White, to happen at UFC 140. However, White, after discovering that Davis was still recovering from a knee injury, admitted to "[jumping] the gun" on the announcement . Early reports also included a Light Heavyweight Championship bout between Jon Jones and Rashad Evans. First, Evans would need to be medically cleared following an operation that required pins to be inserted into his right hand due to an injury during his technical knockout victory over Tito Ortiz. When it became clear that Evans would not be ready for the fight, he was replaced by Machida for the championship bout.

Jon Jones had won the UFC Light Heavyweight Championship earlier in the year after defeating Maurício Rua at UFC 128 by technical knockout. Six months later, Jones defended the title after submitting Quinton Jackson, a former UFC Light Heavyweight Champion, at UFC 135. Lyoto Machida was himself a former UFC Light Heavyweight champion, having won the title via a knock out win over Rashad Evans at UFC 98 in 2009. Machida lost the title a year later to Maurício Rua at UFC 113, the same man from whom Jones won the title in Rua's next outing. Machida's only career losses were to Rua and Jackson, both of whom Jones had beaten earlier in 2011.

The co-main event was a rematch between Frank Mir and Antônio Rodrigo Nogueira. The two had fought about three years prior, when Nogueira was the Interim UFC Heavyweight Champion, at UFC 92 . In that match, Mir became the first person to defeat Nogueria by stoppage, due to a technical knockout in the second round.

Another headlining fight involved Nogueira's twin brother, Antônio Rogério Nogueira, who faced off against Tito Ortiz. The pair were originally scheduled to fight at a UFC Fight Night in March 2011. However, when Ortiz withdrew due to an injury, he was replaced by Phil Davis. Plans for UFC 140 initially paired Ortiz against Rich Franklin. Shoulder surgery required Franklin to withdraw from the fight; Franklin was replaced by Ortiz's original opponent from eight months prior, Nogueira.

Rory MacDonald was expected to face Brian Ebersole at the event. However, on November 8, MacDonald pulled out of the bout because of injury and was replaced by Claude Patrick. Patrick was originally scheduled to face Rich Attonito on the preliminary card of the event. Rich Attonito remained on the preliminary card and faced UFC newcomer Jake Hecht. Dennis Hallman missed the weight allowance for his lightweight return, weighing in at 158.5 pounds. He was fined 20% of his earnings for the fight and his fight with John Makdessi was subsequently changed to a catch weight bout.

== Event ==
UFC 140 consisted of twelve mixed martial arts bouts sanctioned by Ontario's Athletics Commissioner under the MMA rules established by the New Jersey State Athletic Control Board and often referred to as the Unified Rules of Mixed Martial Arts. The non-championship bouts were held for three five-minute rounds. The championship bout between Jon Jones and Lyoto Machida was scheduled for five five-minute rounds. The event was planned to feature four preliminary bouts live on Ion Television and on Sportsnet in Canada as well as three preliminary bouts streamed on Facebook. Due to the early end of the televised preliminary fights, the three fights on Facebook were also televised on cable. The attendance at Air Canada Centre was reported to be just over 18,000, bringing in almost $4 million from ticket sales. The pay-per-view buyrate was reported to be 485,000.

=== Preliminary card ===
The first fight of the evening was between Mitch Clarke and John Cholish. In the second round, Clarke attempted to take down Cholish. During the scramble, Cholish managed to take Clarke's back. Cholish flattened Clarke out and began striking Clarke until referee John McCarthy stopped the fight. Cholish won the fight at 4:36 of the second round, due to a technical knockout, giving Clarke his first ever professional MMA loss.

Rich Attonito faced Jake Hecht in the second bout of the night. Attonito controlled the fight in the first round following a takedown and damaged Hecht while on top of him. Attonito attempted a take down again in the second round, but Hecht hit Attonito in the temple with elbow strikes while defending the takedown. Attonito went down and Hecht continued to punch him until the referee ended the fight. Jake Hecht, in his UFC debut, defeated Rich Attonito by technical knockout at 1:10 of the second round.

Canadian native Mark Bocek's fight with Nik Lentz lasted the full three rounds. Bocek was able to take Lentz down at will and was consistently on top of Lentz throughout the fight. Lentz was not very active from the bottom, although he was able to prevent Bocek from passing his guard. Lentz attempted to apply a guillotine choke several times, but was unsuccessful in submitting Bocek. The judges' decision went to Mark Bocek, 30–27, resulting in Lentz suffering his first loss in the UFC.

In the first bout of the night that aired on cable television, Yves Jabouin faced Walel Watson in the second fight of the night to go the full distance. Most of the fight was held with both fighters on their feet. Watson made use of his longer reach and height to strike from a distance, with Jabouin attempting to get in close to land harder strikes. The second and third rounds also saw Watson attempt to submit his opponent with chokes. In the end, the judges scored the bout a split decision in favor of Yves Jabouin.

John Makdessi then faced Dennis Hallman in a catchweight bout due to Hallman's failure to make weight for the fight. Within seconds of the start of the fight, Hallman was able to take Makdessi down, mounted him and began to ground and pound Makdessi. Makdessi rolled over in an attempt to defend himself, resulting in Hallman taking his back and applying a rear-naked choke. Dennis Hallman gave John Makdessi his first career loss due to submission with the rear-naked choke at 2:58 of the first round. Afterwards, Hallman stated his win should have an asterisk, since he was overweight for the fight.

A middleweight fight between Jared Hamman and Costas Philippou also ended in the first round. Philippou was able repeatedly to hit Hamman with powerful right hand punches causing Hamman to fall to the mat at least four times. The last punch resulted in Hamman falling face first to the mat, at which point John McCarthy ended the fight. Costas Philippou earned his second straight UFC victory by defeating Jared Hamman at 3:11 of the first round via knockout.

The final bout of the preliminary card consisted of light heavyweights Krzysztof Soszynski and Igor Pokrajac. Pokrajac immediately came after Soszynski with punches that staggered and backed Soszynski up to the cage. Soszynski fell to the ground under the rapid series of strikes and covered up to protect himself. Thirty-five seconds into the first round, referee Yves Lavigne stopped the fight, giving Igor Pokrajac the knockout victory.

=== Main card ===
The first bout of the evening that aired on the pay-per-view broadcast was a featherweight bout between Mark Hominick and Chan Sung Jung. At the start, Hominick threw a wild left punch that missed Jung. Jung responded with a straight right that connected and sent Hominick to the ground. Jung followed Hominick down with follow-up punches that resulted in the referee stopping the match. In a tie for the second fastest official knockout in UFC history, Chan Sung Jung defeated Mark Hominick by knockout seven seconds into the first round. The win also earned Jung the event's "Knockout of the Night" award.

Welterweights Claude Patrick and Brian Ebersole then faced each other. The first two rounds of the fight consisted of a lot of clinch fighting up against the cage with occasional grappling on the ground. The third round occurred mostly on the ground, with Patrick making submission attempts at the start and end of the round, while in between Ebersole was on top striking down at his opponent. After all three rounds of the fight were completed, a split decision victory was given to Brian Ebersole.

Tito Ortiz and Antônio Rogério Nogueira then participated in their light heavyweight fight. Ortiz early striking pushed Nogueira back. Nogueira managed to counter Ortiz's attack and reversed the situation, pushing Ortiz back. Nogueira then dropped Ortiz with a knee to the body and began pounding on him. Nogueira threw punches to Ortiz's body and when Ortiz failed to respond to the attack the referee stopped the fight. The result was Antônio Rogério Nogueira earning a technical knockout victory at 3:15 of the first round.

The co-main event then occurred with heavyweights Frank Mir fighting Antônio Rodrigo Nogueira. During the first round, Nogueira hit Mir with a punch that staggered Mir. Nogueira furthered his attack by attempting to take Mir's back and apply a choke submission. After some ground and pound Mir escaped from under Nogueira, grabbed Nogueira's right arm and attempted a kimura lock. The pair rolled over several times as Nogueira attempted to escape the submission hold, but Mir held tightly onto Nogueira's arm. Nogueira refused to tap out to the submission attempt until Mir broke his arm. The official decision was that Frank Mir defeated Antônio Rodrigo Nogueira by technical submission due to the kimura at 3:38 of the first round. As a result of this fight, Mir was awarded the event's "Submission of the Night" and earned the distinction of not only being the first man to knock out Nogueira, but also the first to submit him.

The last bout of the evening was the Light Heavyweight Championship bout, in which Lyoto Machida attempted to take the title away from Jon Jones. Throughout the first round and a half it was a fairly even fight. Jones threw kicks and other strikes at Machida and Machida effectively countered the attacks. In the second round, Jones opened a gash on Machida's forehead, at which point the referee, John McCarthy, suspended the match for the cage-side doctor to look at it. The doctor cleared Machida to continue fighting. After the restart, Jones was able to stun Machida with a punch and was able to apply a standing guillotine choke. Machida refused to tap out and fell to the floor unconscious when Jones released him as the ref stopped the bout. Jon Jones retained his title via technical submission at 4:26 of the second round. It became the first time that Machida had been submitted in a professional fight. This championship fight was also awarded the event's "Fight of the Night".

== Aftermath ==
Rashad Evans was one of the opponents whom Jon Jones was initially reported to fight at this event. That match for the UFC Light Heavyweight Championship eventually occurred at UFC 145 on April 21, 2012.

Frank Mir's victory over Antônio Rodrigo Nogueira moved him one step closer to a championship fight of his own. April 4, 2012, Alistair Overeem was revealed to have failed his pre-fight drug test by the Nevada State Athletic Commission (NSAC). He tested positive for elevated levels of testosterone that exceeded a ratio of 10-to-1, which was over the allowed ratio of 6-to-1. On Friday April 20, 2012, UFC President Dana White confirmed that Overeem has been removed from his fight with Dos Santos and replaced by Frank Mir.

== Results ==
Main Card
Weight class				Method	Round	Time	Notes
Light Heavyweight	Jon Jones (c)	def.	Lyoto Machida	Technical Submission (guillotine choke)	2	4:26	(Note: For the UFC Light Heavyweight Championship)
Heavyweight	Frank Mir	def.	Antônio Rodrigo Nogueira	Submission (kimura)	1	3:38
Light Heavyweight	Antônio Rogério Nogueira	def.	Tito Ortiz	TKO (punches and elbows to the body)	1	3:15
Welterweight	Brian Ebersole	def.	Claude Patrick	Decision (split) (29–28, 28–29, 29–28)	3	5:00
Featherweight	Chan Sung Jung	def.	Mark Hominick	KO (punches)	1	0:07
Preliminary card (Ion Television)
Light Heavyweight	Igor Pokrajac	def.	Krzysztof Soszynski	KO (punches)	1	0:35	(Note: This bout aired on the broadcast following the Hallman vs Makdessi bout.)
Middleweight	Costas Philippou	def.	Jared Hamman	KO (punches)	1	3:11	(Note: This bout aired on the broadcast following the Nogueira vs Ortiz bout.)
Catchweight (158.5 lb)	Dennis Hallman	def.	John Makdessi	Submission (rear-naked choke)	1	2:58	(Note: This bout aired on the broadcast following the Jones vs Machida bout.)
Bantamweight	Yves Jabouin	def.	Walel Watson	Decision (split) (28–29, 29–28, 30–27)	3	5:00
Preliminary Card (Facebook)
Lightweight	Mark Bocek	def.	Nik Lentz	Decision (unanimous) (30–27, 30–27, 30–27)	3	5:00
Welterweight	Jake Hecht	def.	Rich Attonito	TKO (elbows and punches)	2	1:10	(Note: This bout aired on the broadcast following the Pokrajac vs Soszynski bout.)
Lightweight	John Cholish	def.	Mitch Clarke	TKO (punches)	2	4:36

== Bonus awards ==
The following fighters received $75,000 bonuses.

- Fight of the Night: Jon Jones vs. Lyoto Machida
- Knockout of the Night: Chan Sung Jung
- Submission of the Night: Frank Mir

== See also ==
- List of UFC events
