= UFC 124 =

UFC mixed martial arts event in 2010

UFC 124: St-Pierre vs. Koscheck 2
- The poster for UFC 124: St-Pierre vs. Koscheck 2
- Promotion: Ultimate Fighting Championship
- Date: December 11, 2010
- Venue: Bell Centre
- City: Montreal, Quebec, Canada
- Attendance: 23,152
- Total gate: $4,600,000
- Buyrate: 800,000

Event chronology
The Ultimate Fighter: Team GSP vs. Team Koscheck Finale	UFC 124: St-Pierre vs. Koscheck 2	UFC 125: Resolution

UFC 124: St-Pierre vs. Koscheck 2 was a mixed martial arts pay-per-view event held by the Ultimate Fighting Championship on December 11, 2010, at Bell Centre in Montreal, Quebec, Canada. The event was the fourth that the UFC has hosted at the Bell Centre following UFC 83, UFC 97 and UFC 113 and the fifth event held in Canada along with UFC 115 which was held in Vancouver, British Columbia.

== Background ==
A training injury forced Jason MacDonald out of his fight with Rafael Natal on October 20, 2010. He was replaced by UFC newcomer Jesse Bongfeldt.

On October 26, 2010, Anthony Waldburger had to pull out of his fight with Matthew Riddle due to an injury. He was replaced by Sean Pierson.

UFC 124 featured live preliminary bouts streamed on UFC.com rather than Spike TV due to the 2010 Spike Video Game Awards being aired in the same time slot.

UFC 124 marked the first – and only – time that the UFC let the fans vote online for the Fight of the Night. Dana White stated after that he would never do this again and said "The real fight of the night belonged to Matt Riddle and Sean Pierson".

== Results ==
Main card
Weight class				Method	Round	Time	Notes
Welterweight	Georges St-Pierre (c)	def.	Josh Koscheck	Decision (unanimous) (50–45, 50–45, 50–45)	5	5:00	(Note: For the UFC Welterweight Championship)
Heavyweight	Stefan Struve	def.	Sean McCorkle	TKO (punches)	1	3:55
Lightweight	Jim Miller	def.	Charles Oliveira	Submission (kneebar)	1	1:59
Lightweight	Mac Danzig	def.	Joe Stevenson	KO (punch)	1	1:54
Welterweight	Thiago Alves	def.	John Howard	Decision (unanimous) (30–27, 30–27, 30–27)	3	5:00
Preliminary card (UFC.com live stream)
Middleweight	Dan Miller	def.	Joe Doerksen	Decision (split) (29–28, 28–29, 29–28)	3	5:00
Lightweight	Mark Bocek	def.	Dustin Hazelett	Submission (triangle armbar)	1	2:33
Preliminary card
Middleweight	Rafael Natal	vs.	Jesse Bongfeldt	Draw (majority) (28–28, 28–28, 29–28)	3	5:00
Welterweight	Sean Pierson	def.	Matthew Riddle	Decision (unanimous) (30–27, 30–27, 30–27)	3	5:00
Welterweight	Ricardo Almeida	def.	T. J. Grant	Decision (unanimous) (30–27, 30–27, 30–27)	3	5:00
Lightweight	John Makdessi	def.	Pat Audinwood	Decision (unanimous) (30–27, 30–27, 30–26)	3	5:00

== Bonus awards ==
The following fighters received $100,000 bonuses.

- Fight of the Night: Georges St-Pierre vs. Josh Koscheck
- Knockout of the Night: Mac Danzig
- Submission of the Night: Mark Bocek and Jim Miller (split, $50,000 each)

== See also ==
- Ultimate Fighting Championship
- List of UFC champions
- List of UFC events
- 2010 in UFC
