= Kenny Robertson =

American mixed martial arts fighter

- Born: Kenneth Duane Robertson; February 14, 1984 (age 42); East Peoria, Illinois, United States
- Height: 5 ft 10 in (1.78 m)
- Weight: 170.5 lb (77.3 kg; 12.18 st)
- Division: Welterweight
- Reach: 74.0 in (188 cm)
- Fighting out of: Spring Bay, Illinois, United States
- Team: Team Robertson; Central Illinois Combat Club
- Wrestling: NCAA Division I Wrestling
- Years active: 2008–2016, 2021–present

Mixed martial arts record
- Total: 22
- Wins: 15
- By knockout: 7
- By submission: 6
- By decision: 2
- Losses: 7
- By knockout: 2
- By decision: 5

Other information
- Mixed martial arts record from Sherdog

Kenneth Duane Robertson (born February 14, 1984) is an American mixed martial artist. A professional mixed martial artist since 2008, he has also competed for the UFC and Bellator.

== Before MMA ==
In high school he wrestled for Metamora Township High School. Robertson excelled in wrestling, where he was a three time NCAA Division I qualifier for Eastern Illinois University. While competing for the Panthers he was a four time West Regional conference finalist. He took 3rd his freshman year, 2nd sophomore years in 2005, and then won the championship as a junior and senior in 2006 and 2007. As a junior in 2006, he was one match away from being an All American at the NCAA championships. His senior year was the last year that Eastern Illinois University sponsored a wrestling program, making Robertson the last NCAA qualifier the school ever had.

== Mixed martial arts career ==
=== Early career ===
Robertson compiled a 10–0 professional MMA record before signing with the UFC including a submission win over TUF alum John Kolosci at Bellator XXV.

=== Ultimate Fighting Championship ===
Robertson was expected to make his UFC debut against fellow unbeaten fighter, Pascal Krauss on November 13, 2010, at UFC 122. However, Robertson was forced out of the bout with an injury and replaced by Mark Scanlon.

Robertson eventually made his UFC debut on February 5, 2011, at UFC 126, losing to Mike Pierce via TKO in the second round. Following the loss, Robertson was released from the promotion.

=== Post-UFC ===
Robertson had his first post-UFC fight against fellow UFC veteran Lúcio Linhares on October 1, 2011. He won via KO due to a spinning backfist in round 1.

=== Return to UFC ===
Robertson made his UFC return against Aaron Simpson on July 11, 2012, at UFC on Fuel TV: Munoz vs. Weidman, replacing an injured Jon Fitch. He lost the fight via unanimous decision (30-27, 29-28, 29-28).

Robertson defeated Brock Jardine on February 23, 2013, at UFC 157. He was victorious in the first round due to a modified kneebar from the back mount position. The submission applies pressure to the hamstring of the opponent by grabbing the ankle and hyperextending at the knee. The finish earned him the Submission of the Night bonus.

Robertson faced Sean Pierson on June 15, 2013, at UFC 161. Pierson defeated Robertson via majority decision.

Robertson was expected to face Joao Zeferino on September 4, 2013, at UFC Fight Night 28. However, Robertson pulled out of the bout citing and injury and was replaced by UFC newcomer Elias Silverio.

Robertson faced Thiago Perpétuo on March 23, 2014, at UFC Fight Night 38. He won the fight via submission in the first round.

Robertson was briefly linked to a bout with Zak Cummings on July 16, 2014, at UFC Fight Night 45. However, Cummings was pulled from that fight in favor of a matchup with Gunnar Nelson a few days later at UFC Fight Night 46 after his opponent Ryan LaFlare was removed from the card. Subsequently, Robertson eventually faced Ildemar Alcântara on July 5, 2014, at UFC 175. He won the fight via unanimous decision.

Robertson faced Sultan Aliev on January 24, 2015, at UFC on Fox 14. He won the fight via knockout in the first round. The win also earned Robertson his first Performance of the Night bonus award.

Robertson was expected to face George Sullivan on April 18, 2015, at UFC on Fox 15. However, Robertson pulled out of the bout citing injury and was replaced by Tim Means.

Robertson next faced Ben Saunders on July 25, 2015, at UFC on Fox 16. He lost the back-and-forth fight by split decision.

Robertson faced Roan Carneiro on September 17, 2016, at UFC Fight Night 94. He lost the fight via split decision and was subsequently released from the promotion.

=== Post-UFC career ===
After over four years away from competition, Robertson is scheduled to challenge Dante Schiro for the Caged Aggression Welterweight Championship at Caged Aggression 30 on March 27, 2021.

Robertson faced Chris Curtis on July 30, 2021, at XMMA 2. He lost the bout via unanimous decision.

== Personal life ==
Now that his career in fighting has ended he has become a teacher at Eureka High School in Eureka, Illinois, teaching industrial arts. He has also previously taught woodshop at Metamora High School.

== Championships and accomplishments ==
- Ultimate Fighting Championship
  - Performance of the Night (one time) vs. Sultan Aliev
  - Submission of the Night (one time) vs. Brock Jardine
  - 2013
  - UFC.com Awards
    - 2013: Ranked #2 Submission of the Year & Half-Year Awards: Best Submission of the 1HY vs. Brock Jardine
- Yahoo Sports
  - 2013 Submission of the Year vs. Brock Jardine at UFC 157

== Mixed martial arts record ==
Professional record breakdown
22 matches	15 wins	7 losses
By knockout	4	2
By submission	9	0
By decision	2	5

Res.	Record	Opponent	Method	Event	Date	Round	Time	Location	Notes
Loss	15–7	Chris Curtis	Decision (unanimous)	XMMA 2: Saunders vs. Nijem	July 30, 2021	3	5:00	Greenville, South Carolina, United States	
Loss	15–6	Dante Schiro	TKO (punches)	Caged Aggression 30: Triple Threat Day 3	March 27, 2021	2	3:48	Davenport, Iowa, United States	For the Caged Aggression Welterweight Championship.
Loss	15–5	Roan Carneiro	Decision (split)	UFC Fight Night: Poirier vs. Johnson	September 17, 2016	3	5:00	Hidalgo, Texas, United States	
Loss	15–4	Ben Saunders	Decision (split)	UFC on Fox: Dillashaw vs. Barão 2	July 25, 2015	3	5:00	Chicago, Illinois, United States	
Win	15–3	Sultan Aliev	KO (punches)	UFC on Fox: Gustafsson vs. Johnson	January 24, 2015	1	2:42	Stockholm, Sweden	Performance of the Night.
Win	14–3	Ildemar Alcântara	Decision (unanimous)	UFC 175	July 5, 2014	3	5:00	Las Vegas, Nevada, United States	
Win	13–3	Thiago Perpétuo	Submission (rear-naked choke)	UFC Fight Night: Shogun vs. Henderson 2	March 23, 2014	1	1:45	Natal, Brazil	
Loss	12–3	Sean Pierson	Decision (majority)	UFC 161	June 15, 2013	3	5:00	Winnipeg, Manitoba, Canada	
Win	12–2	Brock Jardine	Submission (Suloev stretch)	UFC 157	February 23, 2013	1	2:57	Anaheim, California, United States	Submission of the Night.
Loss	11–2	Aaron Simpson	Decision (unanimous)	UFC on Fuel TV: Munoz vs. Weidman	July 11, 2012	3	5:00	San Jose, California, United States	
Win	11–1	Lúcio Linhares	KO (spinning back fist)	FF 31: Fight Festival 31	October 1, 2011	1	4:44	Helsinki, Finland	
Loss	10–1	Mike Pierce	TKO (punches)	UFC 126	February 5, 2011	2	0:29	Las Vegas, Nevada, United States	
Win	10–0	John Kolosci	Submission (americana)	Bellator 25	August 19, 2010	2	0:57	Chicago, Illinois, United States	
Win	9–0	Igor Almeida	TKO (punches)	MFC: Maximo Fighting Championship	April 30, 2010	2	0:50	San Juan, Puerto Rico	
Win	8–0	Gerald Meerschaert	Submission (kneebar)	MT 19: Madtown Throwdown 19	May 2, 2009	1	3:15	Madison, Wisconsin, United States	
Win	7–0	LeVon Maynard	Decision (unanimous)	C3: Domination	November 22, 2008	3	5:00	Hammond, Indiana, United States	
Win	6–0	Roy Timmons	TKO (punches)	Cage Rage: Kokomo	August 9, 2008	1	1:51	Kokomo, Indiana, United States	
Win	5–0	Herbert Goodman	Submission (armbar)	Combat USA: Battle in the Bay 7	May 30, 2008	3	N/A	Green Bay, Wisconsin United States	
Win	4–0	Brady Gillian	Submission (armbar)	Cage Rage: Lafayette	May 3, 2008	1	0:55	Lafayette, Indiana, United States	
Win	3–0	AJ Skiba	TKO (punches)	C3: Corral Combat Classic 2	April 26, 2008	1	3:18	Hammond, Indiana, United States	
Win	2–0	Jay Finnegan	TKO (punches)	Cage Rage: Lafayette	March 22, 2008	1	0:53	Lafayette, Indiana, United States	
Win	1–0	Joe Bryant	TKO (punches)	Cage Rage: Lafayette	March 22, 2008	1	0:23	Lafayette, Indiana, United States	

== See also ==
- List of male mixed martial artists
