= UFC 129 =

UFC mixed martial arts event in 2011

UFC 129: St-Pierre vs. Shields
- The poster for UFC 129: St-Pierre vs. Shields
- Promotion: Ultimate Fighting Championship
- Date: April 30, 2011
- Venue: Rogers Centre
- City: Toronto, Ontario, Canada
- Attendance: 55,724
- Total gate: $12,075,000
- Buyrate: 800,000

Event chronology
UFC Fight Night: Nogueira vs. Davis	UFC 129: St-Pierre vs. Shields	UFC 130: Rampage vs. Hamill

UFC 129: St-Pierre vs. Shields was a mixed martial arts event held by the Ultimate Fighting Championship on Saturday, April 30, 2011, at Rogers Centre in Toronto, Ontario, Canada.

== Background ==
The event was the sixth that the UFC has hosted in Canada and the first sanctioned mixed martial arts event in Ontario since the sport was legalized in the province in August 2010. The Toronto event was originally titled UFC 131 by the promotion, but later changed to UFC 129 as its early 2011 schedule started to fall more firmly into place.

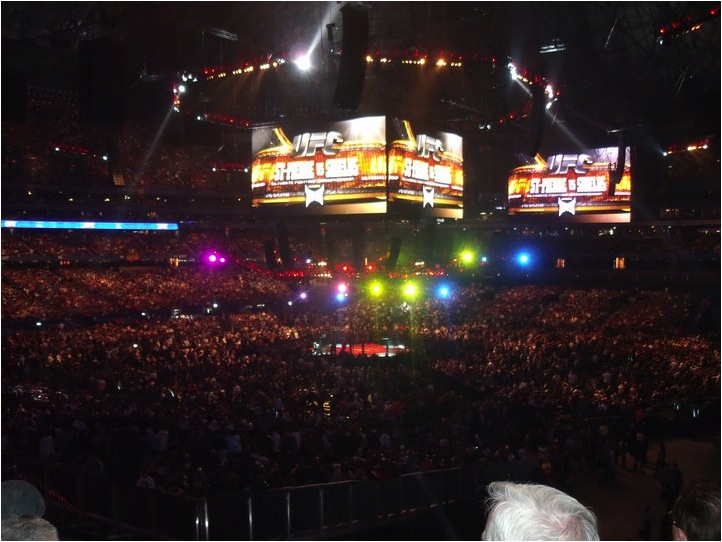
A crowd of 55,000 filled Rogers Centre for UFC 129.

It was the largest UFC event in North American history and coincided with a two-day UFC Fan Expo at the Direct Energy Centre. UFC officials had originally planned for the Rogers Centre to be configured to hold 42,000 fans for UFC 129. The UFC put those tickets on sale to UFC Fight Club members in a special pre-sale on February 10, 2011, selling nearly all of them. They released and sold more tickets the following day to UFC newsletter subscribers in a second special pre-sale. UFC 129 then sold out when tickets went on sale to the general public on February 12, with officials scrambling to up the number of seats to 55,000. Selling out all 55,000 tickets for gate revenues exceeding $11 million, the event shatters both MMA attendance and gate records in North America.

John Makdessi was rumored to face Jonathan Brookins at the event; however, Makdessi instead fought Kyle Watson.

In a conference call for UFC: Fight For The Troops 2 in January 2011, Dana White confirmed that UFC Featherweight Champion José Aldo would defend his title against Mark Hominick on this card, provided that Hominick defeated George Roop. White also stated that, regardless of the outcome of the Hominick/Roop fight, Aldo would still defend his Featherweight Championship at this event. Hominick defeated Roop, via first-round TKO, to confirm his place as no. 1 contender, and solidify the bout with Aldo. After the bout, judge Doug Crosby made a mistake scoring the 5th round 10–8 in favor of José Aldo instead of Mark Hominick, making the final tally 50–43 for Aldo. A correction was made after the bout, and the correct score was 48–45 in favor of Aldo.

Rory MacDonald was expected to face James Wilks at this event, but Wilks was forced from the card, and replaced by Nate Diaz.

On February 11, it was announced that Matt Hamill will no longer fight Phil Davis at this event and will instead fight Quinton Jackson at UFC 130. In a Twitter post, Davis said he was "sorry the fight had been removed from the website, and would be fighting in Toronto regardless." Davis was expected to face Jason Brilz until Tito Ortiz had to pull out of his UFC Fight Night: Seattle fight with Antônio Rogério Nogueira. Davis headlined that event against Nogueira, while Brilz is now expected to fight Vladimir Matyushenko at this event.

Brian Foster was expected to face Sean Pierson at this event, but Foster was forced out of the bout after a pre-fight MRI scan showed that Foster had a brain hemorrhage, and was replaced by Jake Ellenberger.

On February 27, 2011, it was revealed that two of the preliminary bouts would air on a Sportsnet card. These bouts aired at a new time of 8 pm ET / 5 pm PT, as the UFC announced on March 5, 2011, that UFC 129 would be the first PPV to air live at 9 pm ET / 6 pm PT.

UFC Primetime returned to promote the St-Pierre/Shields title fight.

On April 19, 2011, it was revealed that two of the preliminary bouts would air on a Facebook stream. However, on April 21, the UFC instead announced that all of the prelims (except the two fights airing on Spike) would be on the Facebook stream.

== Results ==
Main card
Weight class				Method	Round	Time	Notes
Welterweight	Georges St-Pierre (c)	def.	Jake Shields	Decision (unanimous) (48–47, 50–45, 48–47)	5	5:00	(Note: For the UFC Welterweight Championship)
Featherweight	José Aldo (c)	def.	Mark Hominick	Decision (unanimous) (48–45, 48–46, 49–46)	5	5:00	(Note: For the UFC Featherweight Championship)
Light Heavyweight	Lyoto Machida	def.	Randy Couture	KO (crane kick)	2	1:05
Light Heavyweight	Vladimir Matyushenko	def.	Jason Brilz	KO (punches)	1	0:20
Lightweight	Benson Henderson	def.	Mark Bocek	Decision (unanimous) (30–27, 30–27, 30–27)	3	5:00
Preliminary card (Spike)
Welterweight	Rory MacDonald	def.	Nate Diaz	Decision (unanimous) (30–26, 30–27, 30–26)	3	5:00
Welterweight	Jake Ellenberger	def.	Sean Pierson	KO (punches)	1	2:42
Preliminary card (Facebook)
Welterweight	Claude Patrick	def.	Daniel Roberts	Decision (unanimous) (29–28, 29–28, 29–28)	3	5:00
Bantamweight	Ivan Menjivar	def.	Charlie Valencia	TKO (elbow and punches)	1	1:30	(Note: This bout aired on the broadcast following the Couture–Machida bout.)
Middleweight	Jason MacDonald	def.	Ryan Jensen	Submission (triangle choke)	1	1:37
Lightweight	John Makdessi	def.	Kyle Watson	KO (spinning back fist)	3	1:27	(Note: This bout aired on the broadcast following the St-Pierre–Shields bout.)
Featherweight	Pablo Garza	def.	Yves Jabouin	Submission (triangle choke)	1	4:31	(Note: This bout aired on the broadcast following the Matyushenko–Brilz bout.)

== Bonus awards ==
The following fighters received $129,000 bonuses.

- Fight of the Night: José Aldo vs. Mark Hominick
- Knockout of the Night: Lyoto Machida
- Submission of the Night: Pablo Garza
