= 2027 in UFC =

Mixed martial arts events

Information
- Last date: TBD

Events
- Total events: TBD
- UFC: TBD
- TUF Finale events: TBD

Fights
- Total fights: TBD
- Title fights: TBD

Chronology
2026 in UFC	2027 in UFC	2028 in UFC

The year 2027 is the 35th year in the history of the Ultimate Fighting Championship (UFC), a mixed martial arts promotion based in the United States.

== UFC in 2027 ==
=== Paramount+ in Canada ===
Numbered UFC events in Canada moved to Paramount+ in 2027, ending pay-per-view pricing for Canadian fans.

== Releases and retirements ==
These fighters have either been released from their UFC contracts, announced their retirement, or joined other promotions:

== Debut UFC fighters ==
The following fighters fought their first UFC fight in 2027:

== Suspended fighters ==
The list below is based on fighters suspended either by (1) United States Anti-Doping Agency (USADA) or World Anti-Doping Agency (WADA) for violation of taking prohibited substances or non-analytical incidents, (2) by local commissions on misconduct during the fights or at event venues, or (3) by the UFC for reasons also stated below.

== Title fights ==
Title fights in 2027
Weight class				Method	Round	Time	Event	Notes
Flyweight	Joshua Van (c)	vs.	Manel Kape				UFC 336	(Note: For the UFC Flyweight Championship.)
Welterweight	Carlos Prates	vs.	Michael Morales				UFC 336	(Note: For the interim UFC Welterweight Championship.)

== Events list ==
=== Scheduled events ===
Event	Date	Venue	City	Country	Ref.
UFC 337	Feb 20, 2027	Kia Center	Orlando, Florida	United States	
UFC Fight Night: Pyfer vs. Nickal	Feb 13, 2027	Rocket Arena	Cleveland, Ohio	United States	
UFC Fight Night: Salkilld vs. Saint Denis	Feb 7, 2027	Afterpay Arena	Sydney	Australia	
UFC 336: Van vs. Kape	Jan 30, 2027	Scotiabank Arena	Toronto, Ontario	Canada	
UFC Fight Night: Bonfim vs. Brady	Jan 23, 2027	Meta Apex	Las Vegas, Nevada	United States	
UFC Fight Night: Rodríguez vs. Garcia	Jan 16, 2027	American Airlines Center	Dallas, Texas	United States	

== See also ==
- List of UFC champions
- List of UFC events
- List of current UFC fighters
- 2027 in Professional Fighters League
- 2027 in ONE Championship
- 2027 in Konfrontacja Sztuk Walki
- 2027 in Legacy Fighting Alliance
- 2027 in Absolute Championship Akhmat
- 2027 in Rizin Fighting Federation
- 2027 in LUX Fight League
- 2027 in Oktagon MMA
- 2027 in Cage Warriors
