= UFC 337 =

Mixed martial arts event in 2027

- Promotion: Ultimate Fighting Championship
- Date: February 20, 2027
- Venue: Kia Center
- City: Orlando, Florida, United States

Event chronology
UFC Fight Night: Pyfer vs. Nickal	UFC 337

UFC 337 is an upcoming mixed martial arts event produced by the Ultimate Fighting Championship that is scheduled to take place on February 20, 2027, at the Kia Center in Orlando, Florida, United States.

== Background ==
This event will mark the promotion's fifth visit to Orlando and its first since UFC on ESPN: Thompson vs. Holland in December 2022. It will be the first numbered UFC event held in the city.

== See also ==
- 2027 in UFC
- List of UFC events
- List of current UFC fighters
