= UFC Fight Night: Pyfer vs. Nickal =

Mixed martial arts event in 2027

- Promotion: Ultimate Fighting Championship
- Date: February 13, 2027
- Venue: Rocket Arena
- City: Cleveland, Ohio, United States

Event chronology
UFC Fight Night: Salkilld vs. Saint Denis	UFC Fight Night: Pyfer vs. Nickal	UFC 337

UFC Fight Night: Pyfer vs. Nickal (also known as UFC Fight Night 299) is an upcoming mixed martial arts event produced by the Ultimate Fighting Championship that is scheduled to take place on February 13, 2027, at the Rocket Arena in Cleveland, Ohio, United States.

== Background ==
The event will mark the promotion's second visit to Cleveland and first since UFC 203 in September 2016.

A middleweight bout between Joe Pyfer and Bo Nickal is expected to headline this event. The pairing was initially scheduled for UFC 335 in December 2026, but it was rescheduled to headline this event due to injuries on Nickal's part.

== Fight card ==
Fight card (Paramount+)
Weight class				Method	Round	Time	Notes
Middleweight	Joe Pyfer	vs.	Bo Nickal

== See also ==
- 2027 in UFC
- List of UFC events
- List of current UFC fighters
