= UFC 335 =

Mixed martial arts event in 2026

UFC 335: Oliveira vs. Lopes
- The poster for UFC 335: Oliveira vs. Lopes
- Promotion: Ultimate Fighting Championship
- Date: December 12, 2026
- Venue: T-Mobile Arena
- City: Paradise, Nevada, United States

Event chronology
UFC Fight Night: Adesanya vs. Magomedov	UFC 335: Oliveira vs. Lopes	UFC Fight Night: Rodríguez vs. Garcia

UFC 335: Oliveira vs. Lopes is an upcoming mixed martial arts event produced by the Ultimate Fighting Championship that is scheduled to take place on December 12, 2026, at the T-Mobile Arena in Paradise, Nevada, part of the Las Vegas Valley, United States.

== Background ==
A UFC Middleweight Championship bout between reigning two-time champion Sean Strickland and Nassourdine Imavov was reportedly scheduled for the event. However, the bout did not come to fruition due to a reported pay dispute between Strickland and the UFC. The two previously competed in January 2023 at UFC Fight Night: Strickland vs. Imavov where Strickland defeated Imavov via unanimous decision in a short-notice light heavyweight bout.

Former UFC Lightweight Champion Charles Oliveira is scheduled to defend his symbolic "BMF" (baddest motherfucker) title against former UFC Featherweight Championship challenger Diego Lopes in a lightweight bout serving as the event's headliner. This will mark Lopes' debut in the lightweight division.

Former interim UFC Heavyweight Championship title challengers Sergei Pavlovich and Alex Pereira (who also previously held the UFC Light Heavyweight Championship twice, the UFC Middleweight Championship once and both the Glory Middleweight and Light Heavyweight Championship titles in kickboxing) are scheduled to meet in a five-round heavyweight co-main event bout.

A middleweight bout between Joe Pyfer and Bo Nickal was initially scheduled for the event. However, due to injuries on Nickal's part, the bout was rescheduled to headline UFC Fight Night: Pyfer vs. Nickal in February 2027.

Undefeated middleweight prospects Ryan Gandra and Baisangur Susurkaev were reportedly scheduled to compete at the event, but Gandra withdrew for undisclosed reasons and was replaced by Damian Pinas.

Former LFA Women's Bantamweight Champion Jacqueline Cavalcanti and Michelle Montague were expected to meet in a women's bantamweight bout three weeks earlier at UFC Fight Night: Procházka vs. Stirling. However, the pairing was postponed to this event for undisclosed reasons.

A women's flyweight bout between Maycee Barber and Carli Judice was scheduled for the event. However, Barber had to withdraw for undisclosed reasons leaving it unclear whether a replacement opponent would be found for Judice.

A welterweight bout between former UFC Welterweight Championship challenger Ian Machado Garry and former Bellator Welterweight World Champion Yaroslav Amosov was scheduled for the event. However, for undisclosed reasons, the bout was moved to UFC Fight Night: Adesanya vs. Magomedov one week earlier to serve as the five-round co-main event.

Former interim UFC Featherweight Champion (also The Ultimate Fighter: Latin America featherweight winner) Yair Rodríguez and Steve Garcia were expected to meet in a featherweight bout at the event. However, the pairing was moved to UFC Fight Night: Rodríguez vs. Garcia a month later in order to headline the event.

A featherweight bout between former LFA Featherweight Champion Gabriel Santos and undefeated prospect Luke Riley was scheduled for the event. However, the bout was moved to UFC Fight Night: Adesanya vs. Magomedov, which will take place one week prior, for undisclosed reasons.

== Fight card ==
Main card (Paramount+)
Weight class				Method	Round	Time	Notes
Lightweight	Charles Oliveira (c)	vs.	Diego Lopes				(Note: For the symbolic "BMF" title.)
Heavyweight	Sergei Pavlovich	vs.	Alex Pereira
Flyweight	Brandon Moreno	vs.	Charles Johnson
Bantamweight	Kyler Phillips	vs.	Ethyn Ewing
Middleweight	Damian Pinas	vs.	Baisangur Susurkaev
Preliminary card (Paramount+)
Light Heavyweight	Quentin Pasley	vs.	Junior Tafa

== Announced bouts ==
- Lightweight bout: Chase Hooper vs. Chris Padilla
- Welterweight bout: Ronald Humphrey vs. Nikolay Veretennikov
- Flyweight bout: Roque Conceição Moreira Jr. vs. Nilson Rojas
- Women's Strawweight bout: Angela Hill vs. Shanelle Dyer
- Women's Bantamweight bout: Jacqueline Cavalcanti vs. Michelle Montague
- Women's Flyweight bout: Carli Judice vs. TBD

== See also ==
- 2026 in UFC
- List of current UFC fighters
- List of UFC events
