= UFC Fight Night: Rodríguez vs. Garcia =

Mixed martial arts event in 2027

- Promotion: Ultimate Fighting Championship
- Date: January 16, 2027
- Venue: American Airlines Center
- City: Dallas, Texas, United States

Event chronology
| UFC 335: Oliveira vs. Lopes | UFC Fight Night: Rodríguez vs. Garcia | UFC Fight Night: Bonfim vs. Brady |

UFC Fight Night: Rodríguez vs. Garcia (also known as UFC Fight Night 296) is an upcoming mixed martial arts event produced by the Ultimate Fighting Championship that is scheduled to take place on January 16, 2027, at American Airlines Center in Dallas, Texas, United States.

== Background ==
The event will mark the promotion's seventh visit to Dallas and first since UFC 277 in July 2022.

A featherweight bout between former interim UFC Featherweight Champion (also The Ultimate Fighter: Latin America featherweight winner) Yair Rodríguez and Steve Garcia is scheduled to headline the event. The bout was originally scheduled for UFC 335 in December 2026, but was then moved to headline this event.

A welterweight bout between Daniel Rodriguez and former two-time KSW Middleweight Champion (also former KSW Welterweight Champion) Roberto Soldić is scheduled to take place at the event. The bout was originally booked for UFC 336 two weeks later, but was moved to this event for unspecified reasons.

== Fight card ==
Fight card (Paramount+)
| Weight class | | | | Method | Round | Time | Notes |
|---|---|---|---|---|---|---|---|
| Featherweight | Yair Rodríguez | vs. | Steve Garcia |
| Welterweight | Daniel Rodriguez | vs. | Roberto Soldić |
| Welterweight | Geoff Neal | vs. | Chris Curtis |
| Welterweight | Chidi Njokuani | vs. | Ignacio Bahamondes |
| Heavyweight | Ryan Spann | vs. | Louie Sutherland |
| Heavyweight | Kennedy Nzechukwu | vs. | Elisha Ellison |
| Middleweight | Gilbert Urbina | vs. | Robert Valentin |
| Flyweight | Alden Coria | vs. | Michael Aljarouj |
| Lightweight | Carlos Diego Ferreira | vs. | MarQuel Mederos |
| Lightweight | Magomed Zaynukov | vs. | Piero Guaylupo |
| Bantamweight | John Garza | vs. | Toshiomi Kazama |
| Heavyweight | Steven Asplund | vs. | Gökhan Saricam |
| Women's Strawweight | Sam Hughes | vs. | Karolina Kowalkiewicz |

== See also ==
- 2027 in UFC
- List of UFC events
- List of current UFC fighters
