= UFC 336 =

Mixed martial arts event in 2027

UFC 336: Van vs. Kape
- Promotion: Ultimate Fighting Championship
- Date: January 30, 2027
- Venue: Scotiabank Arena
- City: Toronto, Ontario, Canada

Event chronology
UFC Fight Night: Bonfim vs. Brady	UFC 336: Van vs. Kape	UFC Fight Night: Salkilld vs. Saint Denis

UFC 336: Van vs. Kape is an upcoming mixed martial arts event produced by the Ultimate Fighting Championship that is scheduled to take place on January 30, 2027, at the Scotiabank Arena in Toronto, Ontario, Canada.

== Background ==
The event will mark the promotion's eighth visit to Toronto and first since UFC 297 in January 2024. Beginning with this event, numbered UFC events in Canada will move from pay-per-view to Paramount+.

A UFC Flyweight Championship bout between current champion Joshua Van and former RIZIN Bantamweight Champion Manel Kape is scheduled to headline the event. Former title challenger (also former LFA Flyweight Champion) Brandon Royval is expected to serve as backup and potential replacement for this fight.

An interim UFC Welterweight Championship bout between Carlos Prates and undefeated contender Michael Morales is scheduled to take place at the event. The original plan was for reigning champion (also former UFC Lightweight Champion) Islam Makhachev to defend his title against Prates in the main event. However, Makhachev withdrew, stating that Prates and Morales should fight to determine the true number one contender, and also citing a desire to fight only after Ramadan (observed from February 8 to March 8 in 2027). As a result, the interim title bout was created.

A welterweight bout between Daniel Rodriguez and former two-time KSW Middleweight Champion (also former KSW Welterweight Champion) Roberto Soldić was scheduled for the event. However, for unspecified reasons, the bout was moved to UFC Fight Night: Rodríguez vs. Garcia two weeks earlier.

== Fight card ==
Fight card (Paramount+)
Weight class				Method	Round	Time	Notes
Flyweight	Joshua Van (c)	vs.	Manel Kape				(Note: For the UFC Flyweight Championship.)
Welterweight	Carlos Prates	vs.	Michael Morales				(Note: For the interim UFC Welterweight Championship.)
Lightweight	Lance Gibson Jr.	vs.	Michael Johnson
Bantamweight	Serhiy Sidey	vs.	Louis Lee Scott
Welterweight	Cameron Nelson	vs.	Sean Clancy Jr.

== Announced bouts ==
- Heavyweight bout: Gable Steveson vs. Terrance Chatman
- Middleweight bout: Marc-André Barriault vs. Tresean Gore

== See also ==
- 2027 in UFC
- List of current UFC fighters
- List of UFC events
