= List of UFC events =

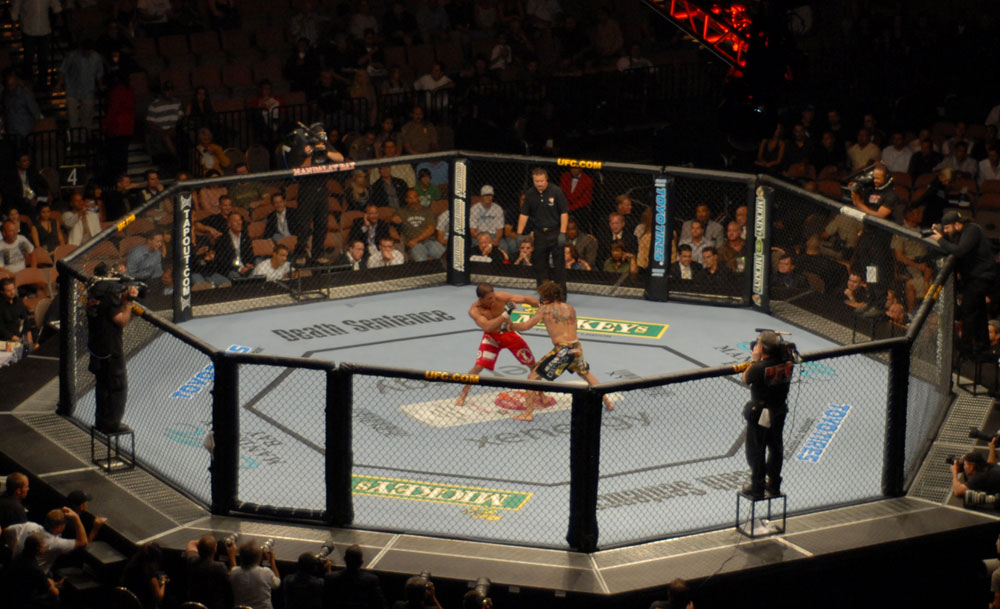
All UFC bouts take place inside the Octagon.

== Overview ==
The UFC's mixed martial arts (MMA) events are separated into nine different formats:

- "Numbered" events, currently airing on Paramount+ and formerly aired on pay-per-view, with some exceptions.
- "Fight Night" events, currently airing on Paramount+ and formerly aired on Spike, Fox Sports 1, Fox Sports 2, UFC Fight Pass or ESPN+.
- "The Ultimate Fighter Finale" events, formerly aired on Spike, FX, Fox Sports 1, UFC Fight Pass or ESPN+.
- "UFC Live" events, formerly aired on Versus
- "UFC on Fox" events, formerly aired on Fox
- "UFC on FX" events, formerly aired on FX
- "UFC on Fuel TV" events, formerly aired on Fuel TV
- "UFC on ESPN" events, formerly aired on ESPN or ESPN2
- "UFC on ABC" events, formerly aired on ABC

Most of the "numbered" events have taken place on pay-per-view, though there have been a few exceptions for reasons such as tape-delay. Events such as UFC 72, which took place in Belfast, Northern Ireland, were sold on pay-per-view, but due to tape-delay, purchase rates were not as high as events that aired at a traditional starting time. As such, events taking part in significantly different time zones, including UFC 70, UFC 75, UFC 89, UFC 95, UFC 105, UFC 120, UFC 122, and UFC 138, were given a same-night airing in American prime time on Spike.

Historically, the UFC has also aired preliminary fights prior to the main fight cards, either on television via Spike, FX, and Fuel TV, or online via Facebook and YouTube. Beginning in August 2013, starting with UFC Fight Night: Shogun vs. Sonnen, the UFC began airing non-PPV events on either Fox Sports 1 or Fox Sports 2. In January 2014, as part of the organization's global expansion, the UFC began airing various international events exclusively on their subscription-based digital network, UFC Fight Pass.

In July 2009, the UFC held its unofficial 100th "numbered event"; however, officially, despite being called UFC 100, it was actually the 101st numbered event (not to mention the 133rd event overall). The UFC signed a deal with Fox Sports Net, after Fox agreed to broadcast one fight in June 2002, during its "All-Star Summer" that month. UFC 37 and 38 had already been scheduled and promoted, but as UFC 38 was the promotion's debut in the United Kingdom, they created UFC 37.5; an event that featured the first ever mixed martial arts fight available on cable television.

As of UFC Fight Night: Procházka vs. Stirling, which took place on November 21, 2026, there have been 799 UFC events held in 170 cities in 33 countries.

=== Other events ===
In May 2017, the UFC announced Dana White would hold Dana White's Tuesday Night Contender Series weekly on UFC Fight Pass (becoming, from January 2019 on, exclusive content on ESPN+ in the United States). As with the earlier web series Looking for a Fight, the goal of the series is for White to scout talent for the UFC. It was stated ahead of the Tuesday Night Contender Series' license being approved that “this is not the UFC, this is not the UFC brand,” but instead a promotion that will allow up and coming fighters the chance to showcase their talents in hopes that one day they may compete in the UFC.

In June 2025, the UFC launched UFC Brazilian Jiu-Jitsu (UFC BJJ), a sister Brazilian Jiu-Jitsu organization. Unlike standard UFC events which feature MMA fights held inside the octagon cage, UFC BJJ events feature submission grappling matches inside an octagonal "bowl".

== Scheduled events ==
Event	Date	Venue	Location	Ref.
UFC 337	Feb 20, 2027	Kia Center	Orlando, Florida, U.S.	
UFC Fight Night: Pyfer vs. Nickal	Feb 13, 2027	Rocket Arena	Cleveland, Ohio, U.S.	
UFC Fight Night: Salkilld vs. Saint Denis	Feb 7, 2027	Afterpay Arena	Sydney, Australia	
UFC 336: Van vs. Kape	Jan 30, 2027	Scotiabank Arena	Toronto, Ontario, Canada	
UFC Fight Night: Bonfim vs. Brady	Jan 23, 2027	Meta Apex	Las Vegas, Nevada, U.S.	
UFC Fight Night: Rodríguez vs. Garcia	Jan 16, 2027	American Airlines Center	Dallas, Texas, U.S.	
UFC 335: Oliveira vs. Lopes	Dec 12, 2026	T-Mobile Arena	Las Vegas, Nevada, U.S.	
UFC Fight Night: Adesanya vs. Magomedov	Dec 5, 2026	anb Arena	Riyadh, Saudi Arabia	

== Past events ==
#	Event	Date	Venue	Location	Attendance	Ref.
799	UFC Fight Night: Procházka vs. Stirling	Nov 21, 2026	Ali Bin Hamad al-Attiyah Arena	Al Rayyan, Qatar		
798	UFC 334: Gane vs. Hokit	Nov 14, 2026	Madison Square Garden	New York City, New York, U.S.	19,740	
797	UFC Fight Night: Cortes-Acosta vs. Walker	Nov 7, 2026	Meta Apex	Las Vegas, Nevada, U.S.	—N/a	
796	UFC Fight Night: Moicano vs. Nolan	Oct 31, 2026	Meta Apex	Las Vegas, Nevada, U.S.	—N/a	
795	UFC 333: Volkanovski vs. Evloev	Oct 24, 2026	Etihad Arena	Abu Dhabi, United Arab Emirates	—N/a	
794	UFC Fight Night: Buckley vs. Malott	Oct 17, 2026	Rogers Place	Edmonton, Alberta, Canada	16,903	
793	UFC Fight Night: Allen vs. Duncan	Oct 10, 2026	Meta Apex	Las Vegas, Nevada, U.S.	—N/a	
792	UFC 332: Silva vs. Wang	Oct 3, 2026	Delta Center	Salt Lake City, Utah, U.S.	16,492	
791	UFC Fight Night: Rosas Jr. vs. Barcelos	Sep 26, 2026	Meta Apex	Las Vegas, Nevada, U.S.	—N/a	
790	UFC 331: Van vs. Pantoja 2	Sep 19, 2026	Crypto.com Arena	Los Angeles, California, U.S.	19,357	
789	UFC Fight Night: Silva vs. Delgado	Sep 12, 2026	Desert Diamond Arena	Glendale, Arizona, U.S.	16,928	
788	UFC Fight Night: Hooker vs. Parnasse	Sep 5, 2026	Accor Arena	Paris, France	15,687	
787	UFC Fight Night: Nurmagomedov vs. Song	Aug 29, 2026	SPD Bank Oriental Sports Center	Shanghai, China	16,188	
786	UFC Fight Night: Hernandez vs. Rodrigues	Aug 22, 2026	Golden 1 Center	Sacramento, California, U.S.	16,867	
785	UFC 330: Makhachev vs. Machado Garry	Aug 15, 2026	Xfinity Mobile Arena	Philadelphia, Pennsylvania, U.S.	19,236	
784	UFC Fight Night: Gamrot vs. Salkilld	Aug 8, 2026	Meta Apex	Las Vegas, Nevada, U.S.	—N/a	
783	UFC Fight Night: Medić vs. Rodriguez	Aug 1, 2026	Belgrade Arena	Belgrade, Serbia	18,623	
782	UFC Fight Night: Ankalaev vs. Guskov	Jul 25, 2026	Etihad Arena	Abu Dhabi, United Arab Emirates	—N/a	
781	UFC Fight Night: du Plessis vs. Usman	Jul 18, 2026	Paycom Center	Oklahoma City, Oklahoma, U.S.	17,173	
780	UFC 329: McGregor vs. Holloway 2	Jul 11, 2026	T-Mobile Arena	Las Vegas, Nevada, U.S.	20,078	
779	UFC Fight Night: Fiziev vs. Torres	Jun 27, 2026	National Gymnastics Arena	Baku, Azerbaijan	—N/a	
778	UFC Fight Night: Kape vs. Horiguchi	Jun 20, 2026	Meta Apex	Las Vegas, Nevada, U.S.	—N/a	
777	UFC Freedom 250	Jun 14, 2026	White House	Washington, D.C., U.S.	—N/a	
776	UFC Fight Night: Muhammad vs. Bonfim	Jun 6, 2026	Meta Apex	Las Vegas, Nevada, U.S.	—N/a	
775	UFC Fight Night: Song vs. Figueiredo	May 30, 2026	Galaxy Arena	Macau SAR, China	12,647	
774	UFC Fight Night: Allen vs. Costa	May 16, 2026	Meta Apex	Las Vegas, Nevada, U.S.	—N/a	
773	UFC 328: Chimaev vs. Strickland	May 9, 2026	Prudential Center	Newark, New Jersey, U.S.	17,783	
772	UFC Fight Night: Della Maddalena vs. Prates	May 2, 2026	RAC Arena	Perth, Australia	13,839	
771	UFC Fight Night: Sterling vs. Zalal	Apr 25, 2026	Meta Apex	Las Vegas, Nevada, U.S.	—N/a	
770	UFC Fight Night: Burns vs. Malott	Apr 18, 2026	Canada Life Centre	Winnipeg, Manitoba, Canada	14,051	
769	UFC 327: Procházka vs. Ulberg	Apr 11, 2026	Kaseya Center	Miami, Florida, U.S.	17,741	
768	UFC Fight Night: Moicano vs. Duncan	Apr 4, 2026	Meta Apex	Las Vegas, Nevada, U.S.	—N/a	
767	UFC Fight Night: Adesanya vs. Pyfer	Mar 28, 2026	Climate Pledge Arena	Seattle, Washington, U.S.	17,854	
766	UFC Fight Night: Evloev vs. Murphy	Mar 21, 2026	The O_{2} Arena	London, England	18,629	
765	UFC Fight Night: Emmett vs. Vallejos	Mar 14, 2026	Meta Apex	Las Vegas, Nevada, U.S.	—N/a	
764	UFC 326: Holloway vs. Oliveira 2	Mar 7, 2026	T-Mobile Arena	Las Vegas, Nevada, U.S.	19,480	
763	UFC Fight Night: Moreno vs. Kavanagh	Feb 28, 2026	Arena CDMX	Mexico City, Mexico	16,454	
762	UFC Fight Night: Strickland vs. Hernandez	Feb 21, 2026	Toyota Center	Houston, Texas, U.S.	17,160	
761	UFC Fight Night: Bautista vs. Oliveira	Feb 7, 2026	Meta Apex	Las Vegas, Nevada, U.S.	—N/a	
760	UFC 325: Volkanovski vs. Lopes 2	Feb 1, 2026	Qudos Bank Arena	Sydney, Australia	18,102	
759	UFC 324: Gaethje vs. Pimblett	Jan 24, 2026	T-Mobile Arena	Las Vegas, Nevada, U.S.	19,481	
758	UFC on ESPN: Royval vs. Kape	Dec 13, 2025	UFC Apex	Las Vegas, Nevada, U.S.	—N/a	
757	UFC 323: Dvalishvili vs. Yan 2	Dec 6, 2025	T-Mobile Arena	Las Vegas, Nevada, U.S.	18,603	
756	UFC Fight Night: Tsarukyan vs. Hooker	Nov 22, 2025	Ali Bin Hamad al-Attiyah Arena	Al Rayyan, Qatar	—N/a	
755	UFC 322: Della Maddalena vs. Makhachev	Nov 15, 2025	Madison Square Garden	New York City, New York, U.S.	20,664	
754	UFC Fight Night: Bonfim vs. Brown	Nov 8, 2025	UFC Apex	Las Vegas, Nevada, U.S.	—N/a	
753	UFC Fight Night: Garcia vs. Onama	Nov 1, 2025	UFC Apex	Las Vegas, Nevada, U.S.	—N/a	
752	UFC 321: Aspinall vs. Gane	Oct 25, 2025	Etihad Arena	Abu Dhabi, United Arab Emirates	13,220	
751	UFC Fight Night: de Ridder vs. Allen	Oct 18, 2025	Rogers Arena	Vancouver, British Columbia, Canada	17,671	
750	UFC Fight Night: Oliveira vs. Gamrot	Oct 11, 2025	Farmasi Arena	Rio de Janeiro, Brazil	16,297	
749	UFC 320: Ankalaev vs. Pereira 2	Oct 4, 2025	T-Mobile Arena	Las Vegas, Nevada, U.S.	19,081	
748	UFC Fight Night: Ulberg vs. Reyes	Sep 28, 2025	RAC Arena	Perth, Australia	12,543	
747	UFC Fight Night: Lopes vs. Silva	Sep 13, 2025	Frost Bank Center	San Antonio, Texas, U.S.	18,005	
746	UFC Fight Night: Imavov vs. Borralho	Sep 6, 2025	Accor Arena	Paris, France	15,724	
745	UFC Fight Night: Walker vs. Zhang	Aug 23, 2025	Shanghai Indoor Stadium	Shanghai, China	—N/a	
744	UFC 319: du Plessis vs. Chimaev	Aug 16, 2025	United Center	Chicago, Illinois, U.S.	20,023	
743	UFC on ESPN: Dolidze vs. Hernandez	Aug 9, 2025	UFC Apex	Las Vegas, Nevada, U.S.	—N/a	
742	UFC on ESPN: Taira vs. Park	Aug 2, 2025	UFC Apex	Las Vegas, Nevada, U.S.	—N/a	
741	UFC on ABC: Whittaker vs. de Ridder	Jul 26, 2025	Etihad Arena	Abu Dhabi, United Arab Emirates	—N/a	
740	UFC 318: Holloway vs. Poirier 3	Jul 19, 2025	Smoothie King Center	New Orleans, Louisiana, U.S.	18,138	
739	UFC on ESPN: Lewis vs. Teixeira	Jul 12, 2025	Bridgestone Arena	Nashville, Tennessee, U.S.	17,007	
738	UFC 317: Topuria vs. Oliveira	Jun 28, 2025	T-Mobile Arena	Las Vegas, Nevada, U.S.	19,800	
737	UFC on ABC: Hill vs. Rountree Jr.	Jun 21, 2025	Baku Crystal Hall	Baku, Azerbaijan	14,424	
736	UFC on ESPN: Usman vs. Buckley	Jun 14, 2025	State Farm Arena	Atlanta, Georgia, U.S.	17,204	
735	UFC 316: Dvalishvili vs. O'Malley 2	Jun 7, 2025	Prudential Center	Newark, New Jersey, U.S.	17,343	
734	UFC on ESPN: Gamrot vs. Klein	May 31, 2025	UFC Apex	Las Vegas, Nevada, U.S.	—N/a	
733	UFC Fight Night: Burns vs. Morales	May 17, 2025	UFC Apex	Las Vegas, Nevada, U.S.	—N/a	
732	UFC 315: Muhammad vs. Della Maddalena	May 10, 2025	Bell Centre	Montreal, Quebec, Canada	19,786	
731	UFC on ESPN: Sandhagen vs. Figueiredo	May 3, 2025	Wells Fargo Arena	Des Moines, Iowa, U.S.	15,627	
730	UFC on ESPN: Machado Garry vs. Prates	Apr 26, 2025	T-Mobile Center	Kansas City, Missouri, U.S.	15,984	
729	UFC 314: Volkanovski vs. Lopes	Apr 12, 2025	Kaseya Center	Miami, Florida, U.S.	18,287	
728	UFC on ESPN: Emmett vs. Murphy	Apr 5, 2025	UFC Apex	Las Vegas, Nevada, U.S.	—N/a	
727	UFC on ESPN: Moreno vs. Erceg	Mar 29, 2025	Arena CDMX	Mexico City, Mexico	19,731	
726	UFC Fight Night: Edwards vs. Brady	Mar 22, 2025	The O_{2} Arena	London, England	18,583	
725	UFC Fight Night: Vettori vs. Dolidze 2	Mar 15, 2025	UFC Apex	Las Vegas, Nevada, U.S.	—N/a	
724	UFC 313: Pereira vs. Ankalaev	Mar 8, 2025	T-Mobile Arena	Las Vegas, Nevada, U.S.	18,869	
723	UFC Fight Night: Kape vs. Almabayev	Mar 1, 2025	UFC Apex	Las Vegas, Nevada, U.S.	—N/a	
722	UFC Fight Night: Cejudo vs. Song	Feb 22, 2025	Climate Pledge Arena	Seattle, Washington, U.S.	18,287	
721	UFC Fight Night: Cannonier vs. Rodrigues	Feb 15, 2025	UFC Apex	Las Vegas, Nevada, U.S.	—N/a	
720	UFC 312: du Plessis vs. Strickland 2	Feb 8, 2025	Qudos Bank Arena	Sydney, Australia	18,537	
719	UFC Fight Night: Adesanya vs. Imavov	Feb 1, 2025	anb Arena	Riyadh, Saudi Arabia	—N/a	
718	UFC 311: Makhachev vs. Moicano	Jan 18, 2025	Intuit Dome	Inglewood, California, U.S.	18,370	
717	UFC Fight Night: Dern vs. Ribas 2	Jan 11, 2025	UFC Apex	Las Vegas, Nevada, U.S.	—N/a	
716	UFC on ESPN: Covington vs. Buckley	Dec 14, 2024	Amalie Arena	Tampa, Florida, U.S.	18,625	
715	UFC 310: Pantoja vs. Asakura	Dec 7, 2024	T-Mobile Arena	Las Vegas, Nevada, U.S.	18,648	
714	UFC Fight Night: Yan vs. Figueiredo	Nov 23, 2024	Galaxy Arena	Macau SAR, China	12,615	
713	UFC 309: Jones vs. Miocic	Nov 16, 2024	Madison Square Garden	New York City, New York, U.S.	20,200	
712	UFC Fight Night: Magny vs. Prates	Nov 9, 2024	UFC Apex	Las Vegas, Nevada, U.S.	—N/a	
711	UFC Fight Night: Moreno vs. Albazi	Nov 2, 2024	Rogers Place	Edmonton, Alberta, Canada	16,439	
710	UFC 308: Topuria vs. Holloway	Oct 26, 2024	Etihad Arena	Abu Dhabi, United Arab Emirates	—N/a	
709	UFC Fight Night: Hernandez vs. Pereira	Oct 19, 2024	UFC Apex	Las Vegas, Nevada, U.S.	—N/a	
708	UFC Fight Night: Royval vs. Taira	Oct 12, 2024	UFC Apex	Las Vegas, Nevada, U.S.	—N/a	
707	UFC 307: Pereira vs. Rountree Jr.	Oct 5, 2024	Delta Center	Salt Lake City, Utah, U.S.	17,487	
706	UFC Fight Night: Moicano vs. Saint Denis	Sep 28, 2024	Accor Arena	Paris, France	15,449	
705	UFC 306: O'Malley vs. Dvalishvili	Sep 14, 2024	Sphere	Las Vegas, Nevada, U.S.	16,024	
704	UFC Fight Night: Burns vs. Brady	Sep 7, 2024	UFC Apex	Las Vegas, Nevada, U.S.	—N/a	
703	UFC on ESPN: Cannonier vs. Borralho	Aug 24, 2024	UFC Apex	Las Vegas, Nevada, U.S.	—N/a	
702	UFC 305: du Plessis vs. Adesanya	Aug 18, 2024	RAC Arena	Perth, Australia	14,152	
701	UFC on ESPN: Tybura vs. Spivac 2	Aug 10, 2024	UFC Apex	Las Vegas, Nevada, U.S.	—N/a	
700	UFC on ABC: Sandhagen vs. Nurmagomedov	Aug 3, 2024	Etihad Arena	Abu Dhabi, United Arab Emirates	—N/a	
699	UFC 304: Edwards vs. Muhammad 2	Jul 27, 2024	Co-op Live	Manchester, England	17,907	
698	UFC on ESPN: Lemos vs. Jandiroba	Jul 20, 2024	UFC Apex	Las Vegas, Nevada, U.S.	—N/a	
697	UFC on ESPN: Namajunas vs. Cortez	Jul 13, 2024	Ball Arena	Denver, Colorado, U.S.	16,884	
696	UFC 303: Pereira vs. Procházka 2	Jun 29, 2024	T-Mobile Arena	Las Vegas, Nevada, U.S.	18,881	
695	UFC on ABC: Whittaker vs. Aliskerov	Jun 22, 2024	Kingdom Arena	Riyadh, Saudi Arabia	—N/a	
694	UFC on ESPN: Perez vs. Taira	Jun 15, 2024	UFC Apex	Las Vegas, Nevada, U.S.	—N/a	
693	UFC on ESPN: Cannonier vs. Imavov	Jun 8, 2024	KFC Yum! Center	Louisville, Kentucky, U.S.	19,578	
692	UFC 302: Makhachev vs. Poirier	Jun 1, 2024	Prudential Center	Newark, New Jersey, U.S.	17,834	
691	UFC Fight Night: Barboza vs. Murphy	May 18, 2024	UFC Apex	Las Vegas, Nevada, U.S.	—N/a	
690	UFC on ESPN: Lewis vs. Nascimento	May 11, 2024	Enterprise Center	St. Louis, Missouri, U.S.	15,960	
689	UFC 301: Pantoja vs. Erceg	May 4, 2024	Farmasi Arena	Rio de Janeiro, Brazil	14,514	
688	UFC on ESPN: Nicolau vs. Perez	Apr 27, 2024	UFC Apex	Las Vegas, Nevada, U.S.	—N/a	
687	UFC 300: Pereira vs. Hill	Apr 13, 2024	T-Mobile Arena	Las Vegas, Nevada, U.S.	20,067	
686	UFC Fight Night: Allen vs. Curtis 2	Apr 6, 2024	UFC Apex	Las Vegas, Nevada, U.S.	—N/a	
685	UFC on ESPN: Blanchfield vs. Fiorot	Mar 30, 2024	Boardwalk Hall	Atlantic City, New Jersey, U.S.	12,198	
684	UFC on ESPN: Ribas vs. Namajunas	Mar 23, 2024	UFC Apex	Las Vegas, Nevada, U.S.	—N/a	
683	UFC Fight Night: Tuivasa vs. Tybura	Mar 16, 2024	UFC Apex	Las Vegas, Nevada, U.S.	—N/a	
682	UFC 299: O'Malley vs. Vera 2	Mar 9, 2024	Kaseya Center	Miami, Florida, U.S.	19,165	
681	UFC Fight Night: Rozenstruik vs. Gaziev	Mar 2, 2024	UFC Apex	Las Vegas, Nevada, U.S.	—N/a	
680	UFC Fight Night: Moreno vs. Royval 2	Feb 24, 2024	Arena CDMX	Mexico City, Mexico	21,546	
679	UFC 298: Volkanovski vs. Topuria	Feb 17, 2024	Honda Center	Anaheim, California, U.S.	18,186	
678	UFC Fight Night: Hermansson vs. Pyfer	Feb 10, 2024	UFC Apex	Las Vegas, Nevada, U.S.	—N/a	
677	UFC Fight Night: Dolidze vs. Imavov	Feb 3, 2024	UFC Apex	Las Vegas, Nevada, U.S.	—N/a	
676	UFC 297: Strickland vs. du Plessis	Jan 20, 2024	Scotiabank Arena	Toronto, Ontario, Canada	18,559	
675	UFC Fight Night: Ankalaev vs. Walker 2	Jan 13, 2024	UFC Apex	Las Vegas, Nevada, U.S.	—N/a	
674	UFC 296: Edwards vs. Covington	Dec 16, 2023	T-Mobile Arena	Las Vegas, Nevada, U.S.	19,039	
673	UFC Fight Night: Song vs. Gutiérrez	Dec 9, 2023	UFC Apex	Las Vegas, Nevada, U.S.	—N/a	
672	UFC on ESPN: Dariush vs. Tsarukyan	Dec 2, 2023	Moody Center	Austin, Texas, U.S.	14,485	
671	UFC Fight Night: Allen vs. Craig	Nov 18, 2023	UFC Apex	Las Vegas, Nevada, U.S.	—N/a	
670	UFC 295: Procházka vs. Pereira	Nov 11, 2023	Madison Square Garden	New York City, New York, U.S.	19,039	
669	UFC Fight Night: Almeida vs. Lewis	Nov 4, 2023	Ginásio do Ibirapuera	São Paulo, Brazil	10,792	
668	UFC 294: Makhachev vs. Volkanovski 2	Oct 21, 2023	Etihad Arena	Abu Dhabi, United Arab Emirates	—N/a	
667	UFC Fight Night: Yusuff vs. Barboza	Oct 14, 2023	UFC Apex	Las Vegas, Nevada, U.S.	—N/a	
666	UFC Fight Night: Dawson vs. Green	Oct 7, 2023	UFC Apex	Las Vegas, Nevada, U.S.	—N/a	
665	UFC Fight Night: Fiziev vs. Gamrot	Sep 23, 2023	UFC Apex	Las Vegas, Nevada, U.S.	—N/a	
664	UFC Fight Night: Grasso vs. Shevchenko 2	Sep 16, 2023	T-Mobile Arena	Las Vegas, Nevada, U.S.	18,766	
663	UFC 293: Adesanya vs. Strickland	Sep 10, 2023	Qudos Bank Arena	Sydney, Australia	18,168	
662	UFC Fight Night: Gane vs. Spivac	Sep 2, 2023	Accor Arena	Paris, France	15,610	
661	UFC Fight Night: Holloway vs. The Korean Zombie	Aug 26, 2023	Singapore Indoor Stadium	Kallang, Singapore	10,263	
660	UFC 292: Sterling vs. O'Malley	Aug 19, 2023	TD Garden	Boston, Massachusetts, U.S.	18,293	
659	UFC on ESPN: Luque vs. dos Anjos	Aug 12, 2023	UFC Apex	Las Vegas, Nevada, U.S.	—N/a	
658	UFC on ESPN: Sandhagen vs. Font	Aug 5, 2023	Bridgestone Arena	Nashville, Tennessee, U.S.	17,792	
657	UFC 291: Poirier vs. Gaethje 2	Jul 29, 2023	Delta Center	Salt Lake City, Utah, U.S.	18,467	
656	UFC Fight Night: Aspinall vs. Tybura	Jul 22, 2023	The O2 Arena	London, England	15,078	
655	UFC on ESPN: Holm vs. Bueno Silva	Jul 15, 2023	UFC Apex	Las Vegas, Nevada, U.S.	—N/a	
654	UFC 290: Volkanovski vs. Rodríguez	Jul 8, 2023	T-Mobile Arena	Las Vegas, Nevada, U.S.	19,204	
653	UFC on ESPN: Strickland vs. Magomedov	Jul 1, 2023	UFC Apex	Las Vegas, Nevada, U.S.	—N/a	
652	UFC on ABC: Emmett vs. Topuria	Jun 24, 2023	VyStar Veterans Memorial Arena	Jacksonville, Florida, U.S.	14,101	
651	UFC on ESPN: Vettori vs. Cannonier	Jun 17, 2023	UFC Apex	Las Vegas, Nevada, U.S.	—N/a	
650	UFC 289: Nunes vs. Aldana	Jun 10, 2023	Rogers Arena	Vancouver, British Columbia, Canada	17,628	
649	UFC on ESPN: Kara-France vs. Albazi	Jun 3, 2023	UFC Apex	Las Vegas, Nevada, U.S.	—N/a	
648	UFC Fight Night: Dern vs. Hill	May 20, 2023	UFC Apex	Las Vegas, Nevada, U.S.	—N/a	
647	UFC on ABC: Rozenstruik vs. Almeida	May 13, 2023	Spectrum Center	Charlotte, North Carolina, U.S.	18,712	
646	UFC 288: Sterling vs. Cejudo	May 6, 2023	Prudential Center	Newark, New Jersey, U.S.	17,559	
645	UFC on ESPN: Song vs. Simón	Apr 29, 2023	UFC Apex	Las Vegas, Nevada, U.S.	—N/a	
644	UFC Fight Night: Pavlovich vs. Blaydes	Apr 22, 2023	UFC Apex	Las Vegas, Nevada, U.S.	—N/a	
643	UFC on ESPN: Holloway vs. Allen	Apr 15, 2023	T-Mobile Center	Kansas City, Missouri, U.S.	16,234	
642	UFC 287: Pereira vs. Adesanya 2	Apr 8, 2023	Kaseya Center	Miami, Florida, U.S.	19,032	
641	UFC on ESPN: Vera vs. Sandhagen	Mar 25, 2023	Frost Bank Center	San Antonio, Texas, U.S.	16,076	
640	UFC 286: Edwards vs. Usman 3	Mar 18, 2023	The O2 Arena	London, England	17,588	
639	UFC Fight Night: Yan vs. Dvalishvili	Mar 11, 2023	The Theater at Virgin Hotels	Las Vegas, Nevada, U.S.	2,361	
638	UFC 285: Jones vs. Gane	Mar 4, 2023	T-Mobile Arena	Las Vegas, Nevada, U.S.	19,471	
637	UFC Fight Night: Muniz vs. Allen	Feb 25, 2023	UFC Apex	Las Vegas, Nevada, U.S.	—N/a	
636	UFC Fight Night: Andrade vs. Blanchfield	Feb 18, 2023	UFC Apex	Las Vegas, Nevada, U.S.	—N/a	
635	UFC 284: Makhachev vs. Volkanovski	Feb 12, 2023	RAC Arena	Perth, Australia	14,124	
634	UFC Fight Night: Lewis vs. Spivac	Feb 4, 2023	UFC Apex	Las Vegas, Nevada, U.S.	—N/a	
633	UFC 283: Teixeira vs. Hill	Jan 21, 2023	Jeunesse Arena	Rio de Janeiro, Brazil	13,604	
632	UFC Fight Night: Strickland vs. Imavov	Jan 14, 2023	UFC Apex	Las Vegas, Nevada, U.S.	—N/a	
631	UFC Fight Night: Cannonier vs. Strickland	Dec 17, 2022	UFC Apex	Las Vegas, Nevada, U.S.	—N/a	
630	UFC 282: Błachowicz vs. Ankalaev	Dec 10, 2022	T-Mobile Arena	Las Vegas, Nevada, U.S.	18,455	
629	UFC on ESPN: Thompson vs. Holland	Dec 3, 2022	Kia Center	Orlando, Florida, U.S.	17,065	
628	UFC Fight Night: Nzechukwu vs. Cuțelaba	Nov 19, 2022	UFC Apex	Las Vegas, Nevada, U.S.	—N/a	
627	UFC 281: Adesanya vs. Pereira	Nov 12, 2022	Madison Square Garden	New York City, New York, U.S.	20,845	
626	UFC Fight Night: Rodriguez vs. Lemos	Nov 5, 2022	UFC Apex	Las Vegas, Nevada, U.S.	—N/a	
625	UFC Fight Night: Kattar vs. Allen	Oct 29, 2022	UFC Apex	Las Vegas, Nevada, U.S.	—N/a	
624	UFC 280: Oliveira vs. Makhachev	Oct 22, 2022	Etihad Arena	Abu Dhabi, United Arab Emirates	13,400	
623	UFC Fight Night: Grasso vs. Araújo	Oct 15, 2022	UFC Apex	Las Vegas, Nevada, U.S.	—N/a	
622	UFC Fight Night: Dern vs. Yan	Oct 1, 2022	UFC Apex	Las Vegas, Nevada, U.S.	—N/a	
621	UFC Fight Night: Sandhagen vs. Song	Sep 17, 2022	UFC Apex	Las Vegas, Nevada, U.S.	—N/a	
620	UFC 279: Diaz vs. Ferguson	Sep 10, 2022	T-Mobile Arena	Las Vegas, Nevada, U.S.	19,125	
619	UFC Fight Night: Gane vs. Tuivasa	Sep 3, 2022	Accor Arena	Paris, France	15,405	
618	UFC 278: Usman vs. Edwards 2	Aug 20, 2022	Vivint Arena	Salt Lake City, Utah, U.S.	18,321	
617	UFC on ESPN: Vera vs. Cruz	Aug 13, 2022	Pechanga Arena	San Diego, California, U.S.	12,804	
616	UFC on ESPN: Santos vs. Hill	Aug 6, 2022	UFC Apex	Las Vegas, Nevada, U.S.	—N/a	
615	UFC 277: Peña vs. Nunes 2	Jul 30, 2022	American Airlines Center	Dallas, Texas, U.S.	19,442	
614	UFC Fight Night: Blaydes vs. Aspinall	Jul 23, 2022	The O2 Arena	London, England	17,813	
613	UFC on ABC: Ortega vs. Rodríguez	Jul 16, 2022	UBS Arena	Elmont, New York, U.S.	16,979	
612	UFC on ESPN: dos Anjos vs. Fiziev	Jul 9, 2022	UFC Apex	Las Vegas, Nevada, U.S.	—N/a	
611	UFC 276: Adesanya vs. Cannonier	Jul 2, 2022	T-Mobile Arena	Las Vegas, Nevada, U.S.	19,649	
610	UFC on ESPN: Tsarukyan vs. Gamrot	Jun 25, 2022	UFC Apex	Las Vegas, Nevada, U.S.	—N/a	
609	UFC on ESPN: Kattar vs. Emmett	Jun 18, 2022	Moody Center	Austin, Texas, U.S.	13,689	
608	UFC 275: Teixeira vs. Procházka	Jun 12, 2022	Singapore Indoor Stadium	Kallang, Singapore	10,787	
607	UFC Fight Night: Volkov vs. Rozenstruik	Jun 4, 2022	UFC Apex	Las Vegas, Nevada, U.S.	—N/a	
606	UFC Fight Night: Holm vs. Vieira	May 21, 2022	UFC Apex	Las Vegas, Nevada, U.S.	—N/a	
605	UFC on ESPN: Błachowicz vs. Rakić	May 14, 2022	UFC Apex	Las Vegas, Nevada, U.S.	—N/a	
604	UFC 274: Oliveira vs. Gaethje	May 7, 2022	Footprint Center	Phoenix, Arizona, U.S.	17,232	
603	UFC on ESPN: Font vs. Vera	Apr 30, 2022	UFC Apex	Las Vegas, Nevada, U.S.	—N/a	
602	UFC Fight Night: Lemos vs. Andrade	Apr 23, 2022	UFC Apex	Las Vegas, Nevada, U.S.	—N/a	
601	UFC on ESPN: Luque vs. Muhammad 2	Apr 16, 2022	UFC Apex	Las Vegas, Nevada, U.S.	—N/a	
600	UFC 273: Volkanovski vs. The Korean Zombie	Apr 9, 2022	VyStar Veterans Memorial Arena	Jacksonville, Florida, U.S.	14,605	
599	UFC on ESPN: Blaydes vs. Daukaus	Mar 26, 2022	Nationwide Arena	Columbus, Ohio, U.S.	18,630	
598	UFC Fight Night: Volkov vs. Aspinall	Mar 19, 2022	The O2 Arena	London, England	17,081	
597	UFC Fight Night: Santos vs. Ankalaev	Mar 12, 2022	UFC Apex	Las Vegas, Nevada, U.S.	—N/a	
596	UFC 272: Covington vs. Masvidal	Mar 5, 2022	T-Mobile Arena	Las Vegas, Nevada, U.S.	19,425	
595	UFC Fight Night: Makhachev vs. Green	Feb 26, 2022	UFC Apex	Las Vegas, Nevada, U.S.	—N/a	
594	UFC Fight Night: Walker vs. Hill	Feb 19, 2022	UFC Apex	Las Vegas, Nevada, U.S.	—N/a	
593	UFC 271: Adesanya vs. Whittaker 2	Feb 12, 2022	Toyota Center	Houston, Texas, U.S.	17,872	
592	UFC Fight Night: Hermansson vs. Strickland	Feb 5, 2022	UFC Apex	Las Vegas, Nevada, U.S.	—N/a	
591	UFC 270: Ngannou vs. Gane	Jan 22, 2022	Honda Center	Anaheim, California, U.S.	17,387	
590	UFC on ESPN: Kattar vs. Chikadze	Jan 15, 2022	UFC Apex	Las Vegas, Nevada, U.S.	—N/a	
589	UFC Fight Night: Lewis vs. Daukaus	Dec 18, 2021	UFC Apex	Las Vegas, Nevada, U.S.	—N/a	
588	UFC 269: Oliveira vs. Poirier	Dec 11, 2021	T-Mobile Arena	Las Vegas, Nevada, U.S.	18,471	
587	UFC on ESPN: Font vs. Aldo	Dec 4, 2021	UFC Apex	Las Vegas, Nevada, U.S.	—N/a	
586	UFC Fight Night: Vieira vs. Tate	Nov 20, 2021	UFC Apex	Las Vegas, Nevada, U.S.	—N/a	
585	UFC Fight Night: Holloway vs. Rodríguez	Nov 13, 2021	UFC Apex	Las Vegas, Nevada, U.S.	—N/a	
584	UFC 268: Usman vs. Covington 2	Nov 6, 2021	Madison Square Garden	New York City, New York, U.S.	20,715	
583	UFC 267: Błachowicz vs. Teixeira	Oct 30, 2021	Etihad Arena	Abu Dhabi, United Arab Emirates	10,171	
582	UFC Fight Night: Costa vs. Vettori	Oct 23, 2021	UFC Apex	Las Vegas, Nevada, U.S.	—N/a	
581	UFC Fight Night: Ladd vs. Dumont	Oct 16, 2021	UFC Apex	Las Vegas, Nevada, U.S.	—N/a	
580	UFC Fight Night: Dern vs. Rodriguez	Oct 9, 2021	UFC Apex	Las Vegas, Nevada, U.S.	—N/a	
579	UFC Fight Night: Santos vs. Walker	Oct 2, 2021	UFC Apex	Las Vegas, Nevada, U.S.	—N/a	
578	UFC 266: Volkanovski vs. Ortega	Sep 25, 2021	T-Mobile Arena	Las Vegas, Nevada, U.S.	19,029	
577	UFC Fight Night: Smith vs. Spann	Sep 18, 2021	UFC Apex	Las Vegas, Nevada, U.S.	—N/a	
576	UFC Fight Night: Brunson vs. Till	Sep 4, 2021	UFC Apex	Las Vegas, Nevada, U.S.	—N/a	
575	UFC on ESPN: Barboza vs. Chikadze	Aug 28, 2021	UFC Apex	Las Vegas, Nevada, U.S.	—N/a	
574	UFC on ESPN: Cannonier vs. Gastelum	Aug 21, 2021	UFC Apex	Las Vegas, Nevada, U.S.	—N/a	
573	UFC 265: Lewis vs. Gane	Aug 7, 2021	Toyota Center	Houston, Texas, U.S.	16,604	
572	UFC on ESPN: Hall vs. Strickland	Jul 31, 2021	UFC Apex	Las Vegas, Nevada, U.S.	—N/a	
571	UFC on ESPN: Sandhagen vs. Dillashaw	Jul 24, 2021	UFC Apex	Las Vegas, Nevada, U.S.	51	
570	UFC on ESPN: Makhachev vs. Moisés	Jul 17, 2021	UFC Apex	Las Vegas, Nevada, U.S.	0	
569	UFC 264: Poirier vs. McGregor 3	Jul 10, 2021	T-Mobile Arena	Las Vegas, Nevada, U.S.	20,062	
568	UFC Fight Night: Gane vs. Volkov	Jun 26, 2021	UFC Apex	Las Vegas, Nevada, U.S.	0	
567	UFC on ESPN: The Korean Zombie vs. Ige	Jun 19, 2021	UFC Apex	Las Vegas, Nevada, U.S.	0	
566	UFC 263: Adesanya vs. Vettori 2	Jun 12, 2021	Gila River Arena	Glendale, Arizona, U.S.	17,208	
565	UFC Fight Night: Rozenstruik vs. Sakai	Jun 5, 2021	UFC Apex	Las Vegas, Nevada, U.S.	0	
564	UFC Fight Night: Font vs. Garbrandt	May 22, 2021	UFC Apex	Las Vegas, Nevada, U.S.	0	
563	UFC 262: Oliveira vs. Chandler	May 15, 2021	Toyota Center	Houston, Texas, U.S.	16,005	
562	UFC on ESPN: Rodriguez vs. Waterson	May 8, 2021	UFC Apex	Las Vegas, Nevada, U.S.	0	
561	UFC on ESPN: Reyes vs. Procházka	May 1, 2021	UFC Apex	Las Vegas, Nevada, U.S.	0	
560	UFC 261: Usman vs. Masvidal 2	Apr 24, 2021	VyStar Veterans Memorial Arena	Jacksonville, Florida, U.S.	15,269	
559	UFC on ESPN: Whittaker vs. Gastelum	Apr 17, 2021	UFC Apex	Las Vegas, Nevada, U.S.	0	
558	UFC on ABC: Vettori vs. Holland	Apr 10, 2021	UFC Apex	Las Vegas, Nevada, U.S.	0	
557	UFC 260: Miocic vs. Ngannou 2	Mar 27, 2021	UFC Apex	Las Vegas, Nevada, U.S.	0	
556	UFC on ESPN: Brunson vs. Holland	Mar 20, 2021	UFC Apex	Las Vegas, Nevada, U.S.	0	
555	UFC Fight Night: Edwards vs. Muhammad	Mar 13, 2021	UFC Apex	Las Vegas, Nevada, U.S.	0	
554	UFC 259: Błachowicz vs. Adesanya	Mar 6, 2021	UFC Apex	Las Vegas, Nevada, U.S.	0	
553	UFC Fight Night: Rozenstruik vs. Gane	Feb 27, 2021	UFC Apex	Las Vegas, Nevada, U.S.	0	
552	UFC Fight Night: Blaydes vs. Lewis	Feb 20, 2021	UFC Apex	Las Vegas, Nevada, U.S.	0	
551	UFC 258: Usman vs. Burns	Feb 13, 2021	UFC Apex	Las Vegas, Nevada, U.S.	0	
550	UFC Fight Night: Overeem vs. Volkov	Feb 6, 2021	UFC Apex	Las Vegas, Nevada, U.S.	0	
549	UFC 257: Poirier vs. McGregor 2	Jan 24, 2021	Etihad Arena	Abu Dhabi, United Arab Emirates	2,600	
548	UFC on ESPN: Chiesa vs. Magny	Jan 20, 2021	Etihad Arena	Abu Dhabi, United Arab Emirates	2,000	
547	UFC on ABC: Holloway vs. Kattar	Jan 16, 2021	Etihad Arena	Abu Dhabi, United Arab Emirates	2,000	
546	UFC Fight Night: Thompson vs. Neal	Dec 19, 2020	UFC Apex	Las Vegas, Nevada, U.S.	0	
545	UFC 256: Figueiredo vs. Moreno	Dec 12, 2020	UFC Apex	Las Vegas, Nevada, U.S.	0	
544	UFC on ESPN: Hermansson vs. Vettori	Dec 5, 2020	UFC Apex	Las Vegas, Nevada, U.S.	0	
543	UFC on ESPN: Smith vs. Clark	Nov 28, 2020	UFC Apex	Las Vegas, Nevada, U.S.	0	
542	UFC 255: Figueiredo vs. Perez	Nov 21, 2020	UFC Apex	Las Vegas, Nevada, U.S.	0	
541	UFC Fight Night: Felder vs. dos Anjos	Nov 14, 2020	UFC Apex	Las Vegas, Nevada, U.S.	0	
540	UFC on ESPN: Santos vs. Teixeira	Nov 7, 2020	UFC Apex	Las Vegas, Nevada, U.S.	0	
539	UFC Fight Night: Hall vs. Silva	Oct 31, 2020	UFC Apex	Las Vegas, Nevada, U.S.	0	
538	UFC 254: Khabib vs. Gaethje	Oct 24, 2020	du Forum	Abu Dhabi, United Arab Emirates	0	
537	UFC Fight Night: Ortega vs. The Korean Zombie	Oct 18, 2020	du Forum	Abu Dhabi, United Arab Emirates	0	
536	UFC Fight Night: Moraes vs. Sandhagen	Oct 11, 2020	du Forum	Abu Dhabi, United Arab Emirates	0	
535	UFC on ESPN: Holm vs. Aldana	Oct 4, 2020	du Forum	Abu Dhabi, United Arab Emirates	0	
534	UFC 253: Adesanya vs. Costa	Sep 27, 2020	du Forum	Abu Dhabi, United Arab Emirates	0	
533	UFC Fight Night: Covington vs. Woodley	Sep 19, 2020	UFC Apex	Las Vegas, Nevada, U.S.	0	
532	UFC Fight Night: Waterson vs. Hill	Sep 12, 2020	UFC Apex	Las Vegas, Nevada, U.S.	0	
531	UFC Fight Night: Overeem vs. Sakai	Sep 5, 2020	UFC Apex	Las Vegas, Nevada, U.S.	0	
530	UFC Fight Night: Smith vs. Rakić	Aug 29, 2020	UFC Apex	Las Vegas, Nevada, U.S.	0	
529	UFC on ESPN: Munhoz vs. Edgar	Aug 22, 2020	UFC Apex	Las Vegas, Nevada, U.S.	0	
528	UFC 252: Miocic vs. Cormier 3	Aug 15, 2020	UFC Apex	Las Vegas, Nevada, U.S.	0	
527	UFC Fight Night: Lewis vs. Oleinik	Aug 8, 2020	UFC Apex	Las Vegas, Nevada, U.S.	0	
526	UFC Fight Night: Brunson vs. Shahbazyan	Aug 1, 2020	UFC Apex	Las Vegas, Nevada, U.S.	0	
525	UFC on ESPN: Whittaker vs. Till	Jul 26, 2020	du Forum	Abu Dhabi, United Arab Emirates	0	
524	UFC Fight Night: Figueiredo vs. Benavidez 2	Jul 19, 2020	du Forum	Abu Dhabi, United Arab Emirates	0	
523	UFC on ESPN: Kattar vs. Ige	Jul 16, 2020	du Forum	Abu Dhabi, United Arab Emirates	0	
522	UFC 251: Usman vs. Masvidal	Jul 12, 2020	du Forum	Abu Dhabi, United Arab Emirates	0	
521	UFC on ESPN: Poirier vs. Hooker	Jun 27, 2020	UFC Apex	Las Vegas, Nevada, U.S.	0	
520	UFC on ESPN: Blaydes vs. Volkov	Jun 20, 2020	UFC Apex	Las Vegas, Nevada, U.S.	0	
519	UFC on ESPN: Eye vs. Calvillo	Jun 13, 2020	UFC Apex	Las Vegas, Nevada, U.S.	0	
518	UFC 250: Nunes vs. Spencer	Jun 6, 2020	UFC Apex	Las Vegas, Nevada, U.S.	0	
517	UFC on ESPN: Woodley vs. Burns	May 30, 2020	UFC Apex	Las Vegas, Nevada, U.S.	0	
516	UFC on ESPN: Overeem vs. Harris	May 16, 2020	VyStar Veterans Memorial Arena	Jacksonville, Florida, U.S.	0	
515	UFC Fight Night: Smith vs. Teixeira	May 13, 2020	VyStar Veterans Memorial Arena	Jacksonville, Florida, U.S.	0	
514	UFC 249: Ferguson vs. Gaethje	May 9, 2020	VyStar Veterans Memorial Arena	Jacksonville, Florida, U.S.	0	
—	UFC Fight Night: Hermansson vs. Weidman	May 2, 2020	Chesapeake Energy Arena	Oklahoma City, Oklahoma, U.S.	Canceled	
—	UFC Fight Night: Smith vs. Teixeira	Apr 25, 2020	Pinnacle Bank Arena	Lincoln, Nebraska, U.S.	Canceled	
—	UFC Fight Night: Overeem vs. Harris	Apr 11, 2020	Moda Center	Portland, Oregon, U.S.	Canceled	
—	UFC on ESPN: Ngannou vs. Rozenstruik	Mar 28, 2020	Nationwide Arena	Columbus, Ohio, U.S.	Canceled	
—	UFC Fight Night: Woodley vs. Edwards	Mar 21, 2020	The O2 Arena	London, England	Canceled	
513	UFC Fight Night: Lee vs. Oliveira	Mar 14, 2020	Ginásio Nilson Nelson	Brasília, Brazil	0	
512	UFC 248: Adesanya vs. Romero	Mar 7, 2020	T-Mobile Arena	Las Vegas, Nevada, U.S.	15,077	
511	UFC Fight Night: Benavidez vs. Figueiredo	Feb 29, 2020	Chartway Arena	Norfolk, Virginia, U.S.	7,098	
510	UFC Fight Night: Felder vs. Hooker	Feb 23, 2020	Spark Arena	Auckland, New Zealand	10,025	
509	UFC Fight Night: Anderson vs. Błachowicz 2	Feb 15, 2020	Santa Ana Star Center	Rio Rancho, New Mexico, U.S.	6,449	
508	UFC 247: Jones vs. Reyes	Feb 8, 2020	Toyota Center	Houston, Texas, U.S.	17,401	
507	UFC Fight Night: Blaydes vs. dos Santos	Jan 25, 2020	PNC Arena	Raleigh, North Carolina, U.S.	14,533	
506	UFC 246: McGregor vs. Cowboy	Jan 18, 2020	T-Mobile Arena	Las Vegas, Nevada, U.S.	19,040	
505	UFC Fight Night: Edgar vs. The Korean Zombie	Dec 21, 2019	Sajik Arena	Busan, South Korea	10,651	
504	UFC 245: Usman vs. Covington	Dec 14, 2019	T-Mobile Arena	Las Vegas, Nevada, U.S.	16,811	
503	UFC on ESPN: Overeem vs. Rozenstruik	Dec 7, 2019	Capital One Arena	Washington, D.C., U.S.	10,816	
502	UFC Fight Night: Błachowicz vs. Jacaré	Nov 16, 2019	Ginásio do Ibirapuera	São Paulo, Brazil	10,344	
501	UFC Fight Night: Magomedsharipov vs. Kattar	Nov 9, 2019	CSKA Arena	Moscow, Russia	11,305	
500	UFC 244: Masvidal vs. Diaz	Nov 2, 2019	Madison Square Garden	New York City, New York, U.S.	20,143	
499	UFC Fight Night: Maia vs. Askren	Oct 26, 2019	Singapore Indoor Stadium	Kallang, Singapore	7,155	
498	UFC on ESPN: Reyes vs. Weidman	Oct 18, 2019	TD Garden	Boston, Massachusetts, U.S.	12,066	
497	UFC Fight Night: Joanna vs. Waterson	Oct 12, 2019	Amalie Arena	Tampa, Florida, U.S.	10,597	
496	UFC 243: Whittaker vs. Adesanya	Oct 5, 2019	Marvel Stadium	Melbourne, Australia	57,127	
495	UFC Fight Night: Hermansson vs. Cannonier	Sep 28, 2019	Royal Arena	Copenhagen, Denmark	12,767	
494	UFC Fight Night: Rodríguez vs. Stephens	Sep 21, 2019	Arena Ciudad de México	Mexico City, Mexico	10,112	
493	UFC Fight Night: Cowboy vs. Gaethje	Sep 14, 2019	Rogers Arena	Vancouver, British Columbia, Canada	15,114	
492	UFC 242: Khabib vs. Poirier	Sep 7, 2019	The Arena, Yas Island	Abu Dhabi, United Arab Emirates	—N/a	
491	UFC Fight Night: Andrade vs. Zhang	Aug 31, 2019	Shenzhen Universiade Sports Centre	Shenzhen, China	10,302	
490	UFC 241: Cormier vs. Miocic 2	Aug 17, 2019	Honda Center	Anaheim, California, U.S.	17,304	
489	UFC Fight Night: Shevchenko vs. Carmouche 2	Aug 10, 2019	Antel Arena	Montevideo, Uruguay	9,225	
488	UFC on ESPN: Covington vs. Lawler	Aug 3, 2019	Prudential Center	Newark, New Jersey, U.S.	10,427	
487	UFC 240: Holloway vs. Edgar	Jul 27, 2019	Rogers Place	Edmonton, Alberta, Canada	12,144	
486	UFC on ESPN: dos Anjos vs. Edwards	Jul 20, 2019	AT&T Center	San Antonio, Texas, U.S.	9,255	
485	UFC Fight Night: de Randamie vs. Ladd	Jul 13, 2019	Golden 1 Center	Sacramento, California, U.S.	10,306	
484	UFC 239: Jones vs. Santos	Jul 6, 2019	T-Mobile Arena	Las Vegas, Nevada, U.S.	18,358	
483	UFC on ESPN: Ngannou vs. dos Santos	Jun 29, 2019	Target Center	Minneapolis, Minnesota, U.S.	10,123	
482	UFC Fight Night: Moicano vs. The Korean Zombie	Jun 22, 2019	Bon Secours Wellness Arena	Greenville, South Carolina, U.S.	7,682	
481	UFC 238: Cejudo vs. Moraes	Jun 8, 2019	United Center	Chicago, Illinois, U.S.	16,083	
480	UFC Fight Night: Gustafsson vs. Smith	Jun 1, 2019	Avicii Arena	Stockholm, Sweden	14,319	
479	UFC Fight Night: dos Anjos vs. Lee	May 18, 2019	Blue Cross Arena	Rochester, New York, U.S.	8,132	
478	UFC 237: Namajunas vs. Andrade	May 11, 2019	Jeunesse Arena	Rio de Janeiro, Brazil	15,193	
477	UFC Fight Night: Iaquinta vs. Cowboy	May 4, 2019	Canadian Tire Centre	Ottawa, Ontario, Canada	10,960	
476	UFC Fight Night: Jacaré vs. Hermansson	Apr 27, 2019	Amerat Bank Arena	Sunrise, Florida, U.S.	12,754	
475	UFC Fight Night: Overeem vs. Oleinik	Apr 20, 2019	Yubileyny Sports Palace	Saint Petersburg, Russia	7,236	
474	UFC 236: Holloway vs. Poirier 2	Apr 13, 2019	State Farm Arena	Atlanta, Georgia, U.S.	14,297	
473	UFC on ESPN: Barboza vs. Gaethje	Mar 30, 2019	Wells Fargo Center	Philadelphia, Pennsylvania, U.S.	11,123	
472	UFC Fight Night: Thompson vs. Pettis	Mar 23, 2019	Bridgestone Arena	Nashville, Tennessee, U.S.	10,863	
471	UFC Fight Night: Till vs. Masvidal	Mar 16, 2019	The O2 Arena	London, England	16,602	
470	UFC Fight Night: Lewis vs. dos Santos	Mar 9, 2019	Intrust Bank Arena	Wichita, Kansas, U.S.	7,265	
469	UFC 235: Jones vs. Smith	Mar 2, 2019	T-Mobile Arena	Las Vegas, Nevada, U.S.	14,790	
468	UFC Fight Night: Błachowicz vs. Santos	Feb 23, 2019	O2 Arena	Prague, Czech Republic	16,583	
467	UFC on ESPN: Ngannou vs. Velasquez	Feb 17, 2019	Talking Stick Resort Arena	Phoenix, Arizona, U.S.	14,269	
466	UFC 234: Adesanya vs. Silva	Feb 10, 2019	Rod Laver Arena	Melbourne, Australia	15,238	
465	UFC Fight Night: Assunção vs. Moraes 2	Feb 2, 2019	Centro de Formação Olímpica do Nordeste	Fortaleza, Brazil	10,040	
—	UFC 233: Cejudo vs. Dillashaw	Jan 26, 2019	Honda Center	Anaheim, California, U.S.	Canceled	
464	UFC Fight Night: Cejudo vs. Dillashaw	Jan 19, 2019	Barclays Center	New York City, New York, U.S.	12,152	
463	UFC 232: Jones vs. Gustafsson 2	Dec 29, 2018	The Forum	Inglewood, California, U.S.	15,862	
462	UFC on Fox: Lee vs. Iaquinta 2	Dec 15, 2018	Fiserv Forum	Milwaukee, Wisconsin, U.S.	9,010	
461	UFC 231: Holloway vs. Ortega	Dec 8, 2018	Scotiabank Arena	Toronto, Ontario, Canada	19,039	
460	UFC Fight Night: dos Santos vs. Tuivasa	Dec 2, 2018	Adelaide Entertainment Centre	Adelaide, Australia	8,652	
459	The Ultimate Fighter: Heavy Hitters Finale	Nov 30, 2018	Pearl Theatre	Las Vegas, Nevada, U.S.	2,020	
458	UFC Fight Night: Blaydes vs. Ngannou 2	Nov 24, 2018	Cadillac Arena	Beijing, China	10,302	
457	UFC Fight Night: Magny vs. Ponzinibbio	Nov 17, 2018	Estadio Mary Terán de Weiss	Buenos Aires, Argentina	10,245	
456	UFC Fight Night: The Korean Zombie vs. Rodríguez	Nov 10, 2018	Pepsi Center	Denver, Colorado, U.S.	11,426	
455	UFC 230: Cormier vs. Lewis	Nov 3, 2018	Madison Square Garden	New York City, New York, U.S.	17,011	
454	UFC Fight Night: Volkan vs. Smith	Oct 27, 2018	Avenir Centre	Moncton, New Brunswick, Canada	6,282	
453	UFC 229: Khabib vs. McGregor	Oct 6, 2018	T-Mobile Arena	Las Vegas, Nevada, U.S.	20,034	
452	UFC Fight Night: Santos vs. Anders	Sep 22, 2018	Ginásio do Ibirapuera	São Paulo, Brazil	9,485	
451	UFC Fight Night: Hunt vs. Oleinik	Sep 15, 2018	Olimpiyskiy Stadium	Moscow, Russia	22,603	
450	UFC 228: Woodley vs. Till	Sep 8, 2018	American Airlines Center	Dallas, Texas, U.S.	14,073	
449	UFC Fight Night: Gaethje vs. Vick	Aug 25, 2018	Pinnacle Bank Arena	Lincoln, Nebraska, U.S.	6,409	
448	UFC 227: Dillashaw vs. Garbrandt 2	Aug 4, 2018	Staples Center	Los Angeles, California, U.S.	17,794	
447	UFC on Fox: Alvarez vs. Poirier 2	Jul 28, 2018	Scotiabank Saddledome	Calgary, Alberta, Canada	10,603	
446	UFC Fight Night: Shogun vs. Smith	Jul 22, 2018	Barclaycard Arena	Hamburg, Germany	7,798	
445	UFC Fight Night: dos Santos vs. Ivanov	Jul 14, 2018	CenturyLink Arena	Boise, Idaho, U.S.	5,648	
444	UFC 226: Miocic vs. Cormier	Jul 7, 2018	T-Mobile Arena	Las Vegas, Nevada, U.S.	17,464	
443	The Ultimate Fighter: Undefeated Finale	Jul 6, 2018	Palms Casino Resort	Las Vegas, Nevada, U.S.	2,123	
442	UFC Fight Night: Cowboy vs. Edwards	Jun 23, 2018	Singapore Indoor Stadium	Kallang, Singapore	6,419	
441	UFC 225: Whittaker vs. Romero 2	Jun 9, 2018	United Center	Chicago, Illinois, U.S.	18,117	
440	UFC Fight Night: Rivera vs. Moraes	Jun 1, 2018	Adirondack Bank Center	Utica, New York, U.S.	5,063	
439	UFC Fight Night: Thompson vs. Till	May 27, 2018	Echo Arena	Liverpool, England	8,520	
438	UFC Fight Night: Maia vs. Usman	May 19, 2018	Movistar Arena	Santiago, Chile	11,082	
437	UFC 224: Nunes vs. Pennington	May 12, 2018	Jeunesse Arena	Rio de Janeiro, Brazil	10,696	
436	UFC Fight Night: Barboza vs. Lee	Apr 21, 2018	Boardwalk Hall	Atlantic City, New Jersey, U.S.	9,541	
435	UFC on Fox: Poirier vs. Gaethje	Apr 14, 2018	Gila River Arena	Glendale, Arizona, U.S.	11,382	
434	UFC 223: Khabib vs. Iaquinta	Apr 7, 2018	Barclays Center	New York City, New York, U.S.	17,026	
433	UFC Fight Night: Werdum vs. Volkov	Mar 17, 2018	The O2 Arena	London, England	16,274	
432	UFC 222: Cyborg vs. Kunitskaya	Mar 3, 2018	T-Mobile Arena	Las Vegas, Nevada, U.S.	12,041	
431	UFC on Fox: Emmett vs. Stephens	Feb 24, 2018	Amway Center	Orlando, Florida, U.S.	10,124	
430	UFC Fight Night: Cowboy vs. Medeiros	Feb 18, 2018	Frank Erwin Center	Austin, Texas, U.S.	10,502	
429	UFC 221: Romero vs. Rockhold	Feb 11, 2018	Perth Arena	Perth, Australia	12,437	
428	UFC Fight Night: Machida vs. Anders	Feb 3, 2018	Arena Guilherme Paraense	Belém, Brazil	10,144	
427	UFC on Fox: Jacaré vs. Brunson 2	Jan 27, 2018	Spectrum Center	Charlotte, North Carolina, U.S.	10,249	
426	UFC 220: Miocic vs. Ngannou	Jan 20, 2018	TD Garden	Boston, Massachusetts, U.S.	16,015	
425	UFC Fight Night: Stephens vs. Choi	Jan 14, 2018	Scottrade Center	St. Louis, Missouri, U.S.	10,052	
424	UFC 219: Cyborg vs. Holm	Dec 30, 2017	T-Mobile Arena	Las Vegas, Nevada, U.S.	13,561	
423	UFC on Fox: Lawler vs. dos Anjos	Dec 16, 2017	Canada Life Centre	Winnipeg, Manitoba, Canada	8,862	
422	UFC Fight Night: Swanson vs. Ortega	Dec 9, 2017	Save Mart Center	Fresno, California, U.S.	7,605	
421	UFC 218: Holloway vs. Aldo 2	Dec 2, 2017	Little Caesars Arena	Detroit, Michigan, U.S.	17,587	
420	The Ultimate Fighter: A New World Champion Finale	Dec 1, 2017	Park Theater	Las Vegas, Nevada, U.S.	—N/a	
419	UFC Fight Night: Bisping vs. Gastelum	Nov 25, 2017	Mercedes-Benz Arena	Shanghai, China	15,128	
418	UFC Fight Night: Werdum vs. Tybura	Nov 19, 2017	Qudos Bank Arena	Sydney, Australia	10,021	
417	UFC Fight Night: Poirier vs. Pettis	Nov 11, 2017	Ted Constant Convocation Center	Norfolk, Virginia, U.S.	8,442	
416	UFC 217: Bisping vs. St-Pierre	Nov 4, 2017	Madison Square Garden	New York City, New York, U.S.	18,201	
415	UFC Fight Night: Brunson vs. Machida	Oct 28, 2017	Ginásio do Ibirapuera	São Paulo, Brazil	10,265	
414	UFC Fight Night: Cowboy vs. Till	Oct 21, 2017	Ergo Arena	Gdańsk, Poland	11,138	
413	UFC 216: Ferguson vs. Lee	Oct 7, 2017	T-Mobile Arena	Las Vegas, Nevada, U.S.	10,638	
412	UFC Fight Night: Saint Preux vs. Okami	Sep 23, 2017	Saitama Super Arena	Saitama, Japan	8,571	
411	UFC Fight Night: Rockhold vs. Branch	Sep 16, 2017	PPG Paints Arena	Pittsburgh, Pennsylvania, U.S.	7,005	
410	UFC 215: Nunes vs. Shevchenko 2	Sep 9, 2017	Rogers Place	Edmonton, Alberta, Canada	16,232	
409	UFC Fight Night: Volkov vs. Struve	Sep 2, 2017	Rotterdam Ahoy	Rotterdam, Netherlands	10,224	
408	UFC Fight Night: Pettis vs. Moreno	Aug 5, 2017	Arena Ciudad de México	Mexico City, Mexico	10,172	
407	UFC 214: Cormier vs. Jones 2	Jul 29, 2017	Honda Center	Anaheim, California, U.S.	16,610	
406	UFC on Fox: Weidman vs. Gastelum	Jul 22, 2017	Nassau Veterans Memorial Coliseum	Uniondale, New York, U.S.	11,198	
405	UFC Fight Night: Nelson vs. Ponzinibbio	Jul 16, 2017	The SSE Hydro	Glasgow, Scotland	10,589	
404	UFC 213: Romero vs. Whittaker	Jul 8, 2017	T-Mobile Arena	Las Vegas, Nevada, U.S.	12,834	
403	The Ultimate Fighter: Redemption Finale	Jul 7, 2017	T-Mobile Arena	Las Vegas, Nevada, U.S.	6,308	
402	UFC Fight Night: Chiesa vs. Lee	Jun 25, 2017	Chesapeake Energy Arena	Oklahoma City, Oklahoma, U.S.	7,605	
401	UFC Fight Night: Holm vs. Correia	Jun 17, 2017	Singapore Indoor Stadium	Kallang, Singapore	8,414	
400	UFC Fight Night: Lewis vs. Hunt	Jun 11, 2017	Spark Arena	Auckland, New Zealand	8,649	
399	UFC 212: Aldo vs. Holloway	Jun 3, 2017	Jeunesse Arena	Rio de Janeiro, Brazil	15,412	
398	UFC Fight Night: Gustafsson vs. Teixeira	May 28, 2017	Ericsson Globe	Stockholm, Sweden	12,668	
397	UFC 211: Miocic vs. dos Santos 2	May 13, 2017	American Airlines Center	Dallas, Texas, U.S.	17,834	
396	UFC Fight Night: Swanson vs. Lobov	Apr 22, 2017	Bridgestone Arena	Nashville, Tennessee, U.S.	10,144	
395	UFC on Fox: Johnson vs. Reis	Apr 15, 2017	Sprint Center	Kansas City, Missouri, U.S.	12,171	
394	UFC 210: Cormier vs. Johnson 2	Apr 8, 2017	KeyBank Center	Buffalo, New York, U.S.	17,110	
393	UFC Fight Night: Manuwa vs. Anderson	Mar 18, 2017	The O2 Arena	London, England	15,761	
392	UFC Fight Night: Belfort vs. Gastelum	Mar 11, 2017	Centro de Formação Olímpica do Nordeste	Fortaleza, Brazil	14,069	
391	UFC 209: Woodley vs. Thompson 2	Mar 4, 2017	T-Mobile Arena	Las Vegas, Nevada, U.S.	13,150	
390	UFC Fight Night: Lewis vs. Browne	Feb 19, 2017	Scotiabank Centre	Halifax, Nova Scotia, Canada	8,123	
389	UFC 208: Holm vs. de Randamie	Feb 11, 2017	Barclays Center	New York City, New York, U.S.	15,628	
388	UFC Fight Night: Bermudez vs. The Korean Zombie	Feb 4, 2017	Toyota Center	Houston, Texas, U.S.	8,119	
387	UFC on Fox: Shevchenko vs. Peña	Jan 28, 2017	Pepsi Center	Denver, Colorado, U.S.	13,233	
386	UFC Fight Night: Rodríguez vs. Penn	Jan 15, 2017	Talking Stick Resort Arena	Phoenix, Arizona, U.S.	11,589	
385	UFC 207: Nunes vs. Rousey	Dec 30, 2016	T-Mobile Arena	Las Vegas, Nevada, U.S.	18,533	
384	UFC on Fox: VanZant vs. Waterson	Dec 17, 2016	Golden 1 Center	Sacramento, California, U.S.	13,136	
383	UFC 206: Holloway vs. Pettis	Dec 10, 2016	Scotiabank Arena	Toronto, Ontario, Canada	18,057	
382	UFC Fight Night: Lewis vs. Abdurakhimov	Dec 9, 2016	Times Union Center	Albany, New York, U.S.	6,216	
381	The Ultimate Fighter: Tournament of Champions Finale	Dec 3, 2016	Palms Casino Resort	Las Vegas, Nevada, U.S.	2,044	
380	UFC Fight Night: Whittaker vs. Brunson	Nov 27, 2016	Rod Laver Arena	Melbourne, Australia	13,721	
379	UFC Fight Night: Bader vs. Nogueira 2	Nov 19, 2016	Ginásio do Ibirapuera	São Paulo, Brazil	9,028	
378	UFC Fight Night: Mousasi vs. Hall 2	Nov 19, 2016	The SSE Arena	Belfast, Northern Ireland	7,222	
377	UFC 205: Alvarez vs. McGregor	Nov 12, 2016	Madison Square Garden	New York City, New York, U.S.	20,427	
376	The Ultimate Fighter Latin America 3 Finale: dos Anjos vs. Ferguson	Nov 5, 2016	Arena Ciudad de México	Mexico City, Mexico	11,460	
—	UFC Fight Night: Lamas vs. Penn	Oct 15, 2016	Mall of Asia Arena	Pasay, Philippines	Canceled	
375	UFC 204: Bisping vs. Henderson 2	Oct 8, 2016	AO Arena	Manchester, England	16,000	
374	UFC Fight Night: Lineker vs. Dodson	Oct 1, 2016	Moda Center	Portland, Oregon, U.S.	6,240	
373	UFC Fight Night: Cyborg vs. Länsberg	Sep 24, 2016	Ginásio Nilson Nelson	Brasília, Brazil	8,410	
372	UFC Fight Night: Poirier vs. Johnson	Sep 17, 2016	State Farm Arena	Hidalgo, Texas, U.S.	5,624	
371	UFC 203: Miocic vs. Overeem	Sep 10, 2016	Quicken Loans Arena	Cleveland, Ohio, U.S.	18,875	
370	UFC Fight Night: Arlovski vs. Barnett	Sep 3, 2016	Barclaycard Arena	Hamburg, Germany	11,763	
369	UFC on Fox: Maia vs. Condit	Aug 27, 2016	Rogers Arena	Vancouver, British Columbia, Canada	10,533	
368	UFC 202: Diaz vs. McGregor 2	Aug 20, 2016	T-Mobile Arena	Las Vegas, Nevada, U.S.	15,539	
367	UFC Fight Night: Rodríguez vs. Caceres	Aug 6, 2016	Vivint Smart Home Arena	Salt Lake City, Utah, U.S.	6,689	
366	UFC 201: Lawler vs. Woodley	Jul 30, 2016	Philips Arena	Atlanta, Georgia, U.S.	10,240	
365	UFC on Fox: Holm vs. Shevchenko	Jul 23, 2016	United Center	Chicago, Illinois, U.S.	10,287	
364	UFC Fight Night: McDonald vs. Lineker	Jul 13, 2016	Denny Sanford Premier Center	Sioux Falls, South Dakota, U.S.	5,671	
363	UFC 200: Tate vs. Nunes	Jul 9, 2016	T-Mobile Arena	Las Vegas, Nevada, U.S.	18,202	
362	The Ultimate Fighter: Team Joanna vs. Team Cláudia Finale	Jul 8, 2016	MGM Grand Garden Arena	Las Vegas, Nevada, U.S.	8,115	
361	UFC Fight Night: dos Anjos vs. Alvarez	Jul 7, 2016	MGM Grand Garden Arena	Las Vegas, Nevada, U.S.	7,760	
360	UFC Fight Night: MacDonald vs. Thompson	Jun 18, 2016	TD Place Arena	Ottawa, Ontario, Canada	10,490	
359	UFC 199: Rockhold vs. Bisping 2	Jun 4, 2016	The Forum	Inglewood, California, U.S.	15,587	
358	UFC Fight Night: Almeida vs. Garbrandt	May 29, 2016	Mandalay Bay Events Center	Las Vegas, Nevada, U.S.	5,193	
357	UFC 198: Werdum vs. Miocic	May 14, 2016	Arena da Baixada	Curitiba, Brazil	45,207	
356	UFC Fight Night: Overeem vs. Arlovski	May 8, 2016	Rotterdam Ahoy	Rotterdam, Netherlands	10,421	
355	UFC 197: Jones vs. Saint Preux	Apr 23, 2016	MGM Grand Garden Arena	Las Vegas, Nevada, U.S.	11,352	
354	UFC on Fox: Teixeira vs. Evans	Apr 16, 2016	Amalie Arena	Tampa, Florida, U.S.	11,273	
353	UFC Fight Night: Rothwell vs. dos Santos	Apr 10, 2016	Arena Zagreb	Zagreb, Croatia	13,177	
352	UFC Fight Night: Hunt vs. Mir	Mar 20, 2016	Brisbane Entertainment Centre	Brisbane, Australia	9,552	
351	UFC 196: McGregor vs. Diaz	Mar 5, 2016	MGM Grand Garden Arena	Las Vegas, Nevada, U.S.	14,898	
350	UFC Fight Night: Silva vs. Bisping	Feb 27, 2016	The O2 Arena	London, England	16,734	
349	UFC Fight Night: Cowboy vs. Cowboy	Feb 21, 2016	Consol Energy Center	Pittsburgh, Pennsylvania, U.S.	7,330	
348	UFC Fight Night: Hendricks vs. Thompson	Feb 6, 2016	MGM Grand Garden Arena	Las Vegas, Nevada, U.S.	7,422	
347	UFC on Fox: Johnson vs. Bader	Jan 30, 2016	Prudential Center	Newark, New Jersey, U.S.	10,555	
346	UFC Fight Night: Dillashaw vs. Cruz	Jan 17, 2016	TD Garden	Boston, Massachusetts, U.S.	12,022	
345	UFC 195: Lawler vs. Condit	Jan 2, 2016	MGM Grand Garden Arena	Las Vegas, Nevada, U.S.	10,300	
344	UFC on Fox: dos Anjos vs. Cowboy 2	Dec 19, 2015	Amway Center	Orlando, Florida, U.S.	14,459	
343	UFC 194: Aldo vs. McGregor	Dec 12, 2015	MGM Grand Garden Arena	Las Vegas, Nevada, U.S.	16,516	
342	The Ultimate Fighter: Team McGregor vs. Team Faber Finale	Dec 11, 2015	The Chelsea at The Cosmopolitan	Las Vegas, Nevada, U.S.	2,566	
341	UFC Fight Night: Namajunas vs. VanZant	Dec 10, 2015	The Chelsea at The Cosmopolitan	Las Vegas, Nevada, U.S.	1,643	
340	UFC Fight Night: Henderson vs. Masvidal	Nov 28, 2015	Olympic Gymnastics Arena	Seoul, South Korea	12,156	
339	The Ultimate Fighter Latin America 2 Finale: Magny vs. Gastelum	Nov 21, 2015	Arena Monterrey	Monterrey, Mexico	10,410	
338	UFC 193: Rousey vs. Holm	Nov 15, 2015	Marvel Stadium	Melbourne, Australia	56,214	
337	UFC Fight Night: Belfort vs. Henderson 3	Nov 7, 2015	Ginásio do Ibirapuera	São Paulo, Brazil	10,628	
336	UFC Fight Night: Holohan vs. Smolka	Oct 24, 2015	3Arena	Dublin, Ireland	9,500	
335	UFC 192: Cormier vs. Gustafsson	Oct 3, 2015	Toyota Center	Houston, Texas, U.S.	14,622	
334	UFC Fight Night: Barnett vs. Nelson	Sep 27, 2015	Saitama Super Arena	Saitama, Japan	10,137	
333	UFC 191: Johnson vs. Dodson 2	Sep 5, 2015	MGM Grand Garden Arena	Las Vegas, Nevada, U.S.	10,873	
332	UFC Fight Night: Holloway vs. Oliveira	Aug 23, 2015	SaskTel Centre	Saskatoon, Saskatchewan, Canada	7,202	
331	UFC Fight Night: Teixeira vs. Saint Preux	Aug 8, 2015	Bridgestone Arena	Nashville, Tennessee, U.S.	7,539	
330	UFC 190: Rousey vs. Correia	Aug 1, 2015	HSBC Arena	Rio de Janeiro, Brazil	14,723	
329	UFC on Fox: Dillashaw vs. Barão 2	Jul 25, 2015	United Center	Chicago, Illinois, U.S.	11,663	
328	UFC Fight Night: Bisping vs. Leites	Jul 18, 2015	The SSE Hydro	Glasgow, Scotland	10,451	
327	UFC Fight Night: Mir vs. Duffee	Jul 15, 2015	Pechanga Arena	San Diego, California, U.S.	5,471	
326	The Ultimate Fighter: American Top Team vs. Blackzilians Finale	Jul 12, 2015	MGM Grand Garden Arena	Las Vegas, Nevada, U.S.	4,844	
325	UFC 189: Mendes vs. McGregor	Jul 11, 2015	MGM Grand Garden Arena	Las Vegas, Nevada, U.S.	16,019	
324	UFC Fight Night: Machida vs. Romero	Jun 27, 2015	Seminole Hard Rock Hotel and Casino	Hollywood, Florida, U.S.	5,604	
323	UFC Fight Night: Jędrzejczyk vs. Penne	Jun 20, 2015	Uber Arena	Berlin, Germany	8,155	
322	UFC 188: Velasquez vs. Werdum	Jun 13, 2015	Arena Ciudad de México	Mexico City, Mexico	21,036	
321	UFC Fight Night: Boetsch vs. Henderson	Jun 6, 2015	Smoothie King Center	New Orleans, Louisiana, U.S.	6,231	
320	UFC Fight Night: Condit vs. Alves	May 30, 2015	Goiânia Arena	Goiânia, Brazil	3,500	
319	UFC 187: Johnson vs. Cormier	May 23, 2015	MGM Grand Garden Arena	Las Vegas, Nevada, U.S.	12,615	
318	UFC Fight Night: Edgar vs. Faber	May 16, 2015	Mall of Asia Arena	Pasay, Philippines	13,446	
317	UFC Fight Night: Miocic vs. Hunt	May 10, 2015	Adelaide Entertainment Centre	Adelaide, Australia	7,984	
316	UFC 186: Johnson vs. Horiguchi	Apr 25, 2015	Bell Centre	Montreal, Quebec, Canada	10,154	
315	UFC on Fox: Machida vs. Rockhold	Apr 18, 2015	Prudential Center	Newark, New Jersey, U.S.	13,306	
314	UFC Fight Night: Gonzaga vs. Cro Cop 2	Apr 11, 2015	Tauron Arena Kraków	Kraków, Poland	10,000	
313	UFC Fight Night: Mendes vs. Lamas	Apr 4, 2015	Patriot Center	Fairfax, Virginia, U.S.	5,417	
312	UFC Fight Night: Maia vs. LaFlare	Mar 21, 2015	Ginásio do Maracanãzinho	Rio de Janeiro, Brazil	7,707	
311	UFC 185: Pettis vs. dos Anjos	Mar 14, 2015	American Airlines Center	Dallas, Texas, U.S.	17,160	
310	UFC 184: Rousey vs. Zingano	Feb 28, 2015	Staples Center	Los Angeles, California, U.S.	17,654	
309	UFC Fight Night: Bigfoot vs. Mir	Feb 22, 2015	Ginásio Gigantinho	Porto Alegre, Brazil	5,080	
308	UFC Fight Night: Henderson vs. Thatch	Feb 14, 2015	1stBank Center	Broomfield, Colorado, U.S.	5,807	
307	UFC 183: Silva vs. Diaz	Jan 31, 2015	MGM Grand Garden Arena	Las Vegas, Nevada, U.S.	13,114	
306	UFC on Fox: Gustafsson vs. Johnson	Jan 24, 2015	Tele2 Arena	Stockholm, Sweden	30,000	
305	UFC Fight Night: McGregor vs. Siver	Jan 18, 2015	TD Garden	Boston, Massachusetts, U.S.	13,828	
304	UFC 182: Jones vs. Cormier	Jan 3, 2015	MGM Grand Garden Arena	Las Vegas, Nevada, U.S.	11,575	
303	UFC Fight Night: Machida vs. Dollaway	Dec 20, 2014	Ginásio José Corrêa	Barueri, Brazil	—N/a	
302	UFC on Fox: dos Santos vs. Miocic	Dec 13, 2014	U.S. Airways Center	Phoenix, Arizona, U.S.	15,300	
301	The Ultimate Fighter: A Champion Will Be Crowned Finale	Dec 12, 2014	Palms Casino Resort	Las Vegas, Nevada, U.S.	1,800	
300	UFC 181: Hendricks vs. Lawler II	Dec 6, 2014	Mandalay Bay Events Center	Las Vegas, Nevada, U.S.	9,617	
299	UFC Fight Night: Edgar vs. Swanson	Nov 22, 2014	Frank Erwin Center	Austin, Texas, U.S.	10,131	
298	UFC 180: Werdum vs. Hunt	Nov 15, 2014	Arena Ciudad de México	Mexico City, Mexico	21,000	
297	UFC Fight Night: Shogun vs. Saint Preux	Nov 8, 2014	Ginásio Municipal Tancredo Neves	Uberlândia, Brazil	5,671	
296	UFC Fight Night: Rockhold vs. Bisping	Nov 8, 2014	Qudos Bank Arena	Sydney, Australia	9,904	
295	UFC 179: Aldo vs. Mendes 2	Oct 25, 2014	Ginásio do Maracanãzinho	Rio de Janeiro, Brazil	11,415	
294	UFC Fight Night: MacDonald vs. Saffiedine	Oct 4, 2014	Scotiabank Centre	Halifax, Nova Scotia, Canada	10,782	
293	UFC Fight Night: Nelson vs. Story	Oct 4, 2014	Avicii Arena	Stockholm, Sweden	10,026	
292	UFC 178: Johnson vs. Cariaso	Sep 27, 2014	MGM Grand Garden Arena	Las Vegas, Nevada, U.S.	10,544	
291	UFC Fight Night: Hunt vs. Nelson	Sep 20, 2014	Saitama Super Arena	Saitama, Japan	12,395	
290	UFC Fight Night: Bigfoot vs. Arlovski	Sep 13, 2014	Ginásio Nilson Nelson	Brasília, Brazil	8,822	
289	UFC Fight Night: Jacaré vs. Mousasi	Sep 5, 2014	Foxwoods Resort Casino	Ledyard, Connecticut, U.S.	4,086	
288	UFC 177: Dillashaw vs. Soto	Aug 30, 2014	Sleep Train Arena	Sacramento, California, U.S.	11,100	
287	UFC Fight Night: Henderson vs. dos Anjos	Aug 23, 2014	BOK Center	Tulsa, Oklahoma, U.S.	7,119	
286	UFC Fight Night: Bisping vs. Le	Aug 23, 2014	Cotai Arena	Macau SAR, China	7,022	
285	UFC Fight Night: Bader vs. Saint Preux	Aug 16, 2014	Cross Insurance Center	Bangor, Maine, U.S.	5,329	
—	UFC 176: Aldo vs. Mendes II	Aug 2, 2014	Staples Center	Los Angeles, California, U.S.	Canceled	
284	UFC on Fox: Lawler vs. Brown	Jul 26, 2014	SAP Center	San Jose, California, U.S.	11,482	
283	UFC Fight Night: McGregor vs. Brandão	Jul 19, 2014	3Arena	Dublin, Ireland	9,500	
282	UFC Fight Night: Cowboy vs. Miller	Jul 16, 2014	Revel Casino Hotel	Atlantic City, New Jersey, U.S.	4,115	
281	The Ultimate Fighter: Team Edgar vs. Team Penn Finale	Jul 6, 2014	Mandalay Bay Events Center	Las Vegas, Nevada, U.S.	6,500	
280	UFC 175: Weidman vs. Machida	Jul 5, 2014	Mandalay Bay Events Center	Las Vegas, Nevada, U.S.	10,088	
279	UFC Fight Night: Swanson vs. Stephens	Jun 28, 2014	AT&T Center	San Antonio, Texas, U.S.	9,227	
278	UFC Fight Night: Te Huna vs. Marquardt	Jun 28, 2014	Vector Arena	Auckland, New Zealand	8,089	
277	UFC 174: Johnson vs. Bagautinov	Jun 14, 2014	Rogers Arena	Vancouver, British Columbia, Canada	13,506	
276	UFC Fight Night: Henderson vs. Khabilov	Jun 7, 2014	Tingley Coliseum	Albuquerque, New Mexico, U.S.	8,775	
275	The Ultimate Fighter Brazil 3 Finale: Miocic vs. Maldonado	May 31, 2014	Ginásio do Ibirapuera	São Paulo, Brazil	8,986	
274	UFC Fight Night: Muñoz vs. Mousasi	May 31, 2014	Uber Arena	Berlin, Germany	8,000	
273	UFC 173: Barão vs. Dillashaw	May 24, 2014	MGM Grand Garden Arena	Las Vegas, Nevada, U.S.	11,036	
272	UFC Fight Night: Brown vs. Silva	May 10, 2014	U.S. Bank Arena	Cincinnati, Ohio, U.S.	6,143	
271	UFC 172: Jones vs. Teixeira	Apr 26, 2014	Baltimore Arena	Baltimore, Maryland, U.S.	13,485	
270	UFC on Fox: Werdum vs. Browne	Apr 19, 2014	Amway Center	Orlando, Florida, U.S.	17,000	
269	The Ultimate Fighter Nations Finale: Bisping vs. Kennedy	Apr 16, 2014	Colisée Pepsi	Quebec City, Quebec, Canada	5,029	
268	UFC Fight Night: Nogueira vs. Nelson	Apr 11, 2014	Etihad Park	Abu Dhabi, United Arab Emirates	7,963	
267	UFC Fight Night: Shogun vs. Henderson 2	Mar 23, 2014	Ginásio Nélio Dias	Natal, Brazil	6,828	
266	UFC 171: Hendricks vs. Lawler	Mar 15, 2014	American Airlines Center	Dallas, Texas, U.S.	19,324	
265	UFC Fight Night: Gustafsson vs. Manuwa	Mar 8, 2014	The O2 Arena	London, England	14,604	
264	The Ultimate Fighter China Finale: Kim vs. Hathaway	Mar 1, 2014	Cotai Arena	Macau SAR, China	6,000	
263	UFC 170: Rousey vs. McMann	Feb 22, 2014	Mandalay Bay Events Center	Las Vegas, Nevada, U.S.	10,217	
262	UFC Fight Night: Machida vs. Mousasi	Feb 15, 2014	Arena Jaraguá	Jaraguá do Sul, Brazil	7,511	
261	UFC 169: Barão vs. Faber 2	Feb 1, 2014	Prudential Center	Newark, New Jersey, U.S.	14,308	
260	UFC on Fox: Henderson vs. Thomson	Jan 25, 2014	United Center	Chicago, Illinois, U.S.	10,895	
259	UFC Fight Night: Rockhold vs. Philippou	Jan 15, 2014	Arena at Gwinnett Center	Duluth, Georgia, U.S.	5,822	
258	UFC Fight Night: Saffiedine vs. Lim	Jan 4, 2014	Marina Bay Sands	Marina Bay, Singapore	5,216	
257	UFC 168: Weidman vs. Silva 2	Dec 28, 2013	MGM Grand Garden Arena	Las Vegas, Nevada, U.S.	15,650	
256	UFC on Fox: Johnson vs. Benavidez 2	Dec 14, 2013	Sleep Train Arena	Sacramento, California, U.S.	11,573	
255	UFC Fight Night: Hunt vs. Bigfoot	Dec 7, 2013	Brisbane Entertainment Centre	Brisbane, Australia	11,393	
254	The Ultimate Fighter: Team Rousey vs. Team Tate Finale	Nov 30, 2013	Mandalay Bay Events Center	Las Vegas, Nevada, U.S.	4,853	
253	UFC 167: St-Pierre vs. Hendricks	Nov 16, 2013	MGM Grand Garden Arena	Las Vegas, Nevada, U.S.	14,856	
252	UFC Fight Night: Belfort vs. Henderson 2	Nov 9, 2013	Goiânia Arena	Goiânia, Brazil	10,565	
251	UFC: Fight for the Troops 3	Nov 6, 2013	Fort Campbell	Fort Campbell, Kentucky, U.S.	—N/a	
250	UFC Fight Night: Machida vs. Muñoz	Oct 26, 2013	Phones 4u Arena	Manchester, England	10,355	
249	UFC 166: Velasquez vs. dos Santos III	Oct 19, 2013	Toyota Center	Houston, Texas, U.S.	17,238	
248	UFC Fight Night: Maia vs. Shields	Oct 9, 2013	Ginásio José Corrêa	Barueri, Brazil	6,621	
247	UFC 165: Jones vs. Gustafsson	Sep 21, 2013	Scotiabank Arena	Toronto, Ontario, Canada	15,504	
246	UFC Fight Night: Teixeira vs. Bader	Sep 4, 2013	Mineirinho Arena	Belo Horizonte, Brazil	5,126	
245	UFC 164: Henderson vs. Pettis 2	Aug 31, 2013	BMO Harris Bradley Center	Milwaukee, Wisconsin, U.S.	9,178	
244	UFC Fight Night: Condit vs. Kampmann 2	Aug 28, 2013	Bankers Life Fieldhouse	Indianapolis, Indiana, U.S.	6,417	
243	UFC Fight Night: Shogun vs. Sonnen	Aug 17, 2013	TD Garden	Boston, Massachusetts, U.S.	14,181	
242	UFC 163: Aldo vs. Korean Zombie	Aug 3, 2013	HSBC Arena	Rio de Janeiro, Brazil	13,873	
241	UFC on Fox: Johnson vs. Moraga	Jul 27, 2013	Climate Pledge Arena	Seattle, Washington, U.S.	8,967	
240	UFC 162: Silva vs. Weidman	Jul 6, 2013	MGM Grand Garden Arena	Las Vegas, Nevada, U.S.	12,964	
239	UFC 161: Evans vs. Henderson	Jun 15, 2013	Canada Life Centre	Winnipeg, Manitoba, Canada	14,754	
238	UFC on Fuel TV: Nogueira vs. Werdum	Jun 8, 2013	Ginásio Paulo Sarasate	Fortaleza, Brazil	6,286	
237	UFC 160: Velasquez vs. Bigfoot 2	May 25, 2013	MGM Grand Garden Arena	Las Vegas, Nevada, U.S.	12,380	
236	UFC on FX: Belfort vs. Rockhold	May 18, 2013	Arena Jaraguá	Jaraguá do Sul, Brazil	7,642	
235	UFC 159: Jones vs. Sonnen	Apr 27, 2013	Prudential Center	Newark, New Jersey, U.S.	15,227	
234	UFC on Fox: Henderson vs. Melendez	Apr 20, 2013	SAP Center	San Jose, California, U.S.	13,506	
233	The Ultimate Fighter: Team Jones vs. Team Sonnen Finale	Apr 13, 2013	Mandalay Bay Events Center	Las Vegas, Nevada, U.S.	5,918	
232	UFC on Fuel TV: Mousasi vs. Latifi	Apr 6, 2013	Avicii Arena	Stockholm, Sweden	14,506	
231	UFC 158: St-Pierre vs. Diaz	Mar 16, 2013	Bell Centre	Montreal, Quebec, Canada	20,145	
230	UFC on Fuel TV: Silva vs. Stann	Mar 3, 2013	Saitama Super Arena	Saitama, Japan	14,682	
229	UFC 157: Rousey vs. Carmouche	Feb 23, 2013	Honda Center	Anaheim, California, U.S.	13,257	
228	UFC on Fuel TV: Barão vs. McDonald	Feb 16, 2013	Wembley Arena	London, England	10,349	
227	UFC 156: Aldo vs. Edgar	Feb 2, 2013	Mandalay Bay Events Center	Las Vegas, Nevada, U.S.	10,275	
226	UFC on Fox: Johnson vs. Dodson	Jan 26, 2013	United Center	Chicago, Illinois, U.S.	16,091	
225	UFC on FX: Belfort vs. Bisping	Jan 19, 2013	Ginásio do Ibirapuera	São Paulo, Brazil	9,116	
224	UFC 155: dos Santos vs. Velasquez 2	Dec 29, 2012	MGM Grand Garden Arena	Las Vegas, Nevada, U.S.	13,561	
223	The Ultimate Fighter: Team Carwin vs. Team Nelson Finale	Dec 15, 2012	Hard Rock Hotel and Casino	Las Vegas, Nevada, U.S.	2,500	
222	UFC on FX: Sotiropoulos vs. Pearson	Dec 15, 2012	Gold Coast Convention and Exhibition Centre	Gold Coast, Australia	5,133	
221	UFC on Fox: Henderson vs. Diaz	Dec 8, 2012	Climate Pledge Arena	Seattle, Washington, U.S.	14,387	
220	UFC 154: St-Pierre vs. Condit	Nov 17, 2012	Bell Centre	Montreal, Quebec, Canada	17,249	
219	UFC on Fuel TV: Franklin vs. Le	Nov 10, 2012	Cotai Arena	Macau SAR, China	8,415	
218	UFC 153: Silva vs. Bonnar	Oct 13, 2012	Farmasi Arena	Rio de Janeiro, Brazil	16,844	
217	UFC on FX: Browne vs. Bigfoot	Oct 5, 2012	Target Center	Minneapolis, Minnesota, U.S.	7,049	
216	UFC on Fuel TV: Struve vs. Miocic	Sep 29, 2012	Motorpoint Arena	Nottingham, England	7,241	
215	UFC 152: Jones vs. Belfort	Sep 22, 2012	Scotiabank Arena	Toronto, Ontario, Canada	16,800	
—	UFC 151: Jones vs. Henderson	Sep 1, 2012	Mandalay Bay Events Center	Las Vegas, Nevada, U.S.	Canceled	
214	UFC 150: Henderson vs. Edgar II	Aug 11, 2012	Ball Arena	Denver, Colorado, U.S.	13,027	
213	UFC on Fox: Shogun vs. Vera	Aug 4, 2012	Crypto.com Arena	Los Angeles, California, U.S.	16,080	
212	UFC 149: Faber vs. Barão	Jul 21, 2012	Scotiabank Saddledome	Calgary, Alberta, Canada	16,089	
211	UFC on Fuel TV: Muñoz vs. Weidman	Jul 11, 2012	SAP Center	San Jose, California, U.S.	4,250	
210	UFC 148: Silva vs. Sonnen II	Jul 7, 2012	MGM Grand Garden Arena	Las Vegas, Nevada, U.S.	15,104	
209	UFC 147: Silva vs. Franklin II	Jun 23, 2012	Mineirinho Arena	Belo Horizonte, Brazil	16,643	
208	UFC on FX: Maynard vs. Guida	Jun 22, 2012	Revel Casino Hotel	Atlantic City, New Jersey, U.S.	4,652	
207	UFC on FX: Johnson vs. McCall 2	Jun 8, 2012	Amerant Bank Arena	Sunrise, Florida, U.S.	6,635	
206	The Ultimate Fighter: Live Finale	Jun 1, 2012	Palms Casino Resort	Las Vegas, Nevada, U.S.	1,628	
205	UFC 146: dos Santos vs. Mir	May 26, 2012	MGM Grand Garden Arena	Las Vegas, Nevada, U.S.	14,674	
204	UFC on Fuel TV: The Korean Zombie vs. Poirier	May 15, 2012	EagleBank Arena	Fairfax, Virginia, U.S.	6,668	
203	UFC on Fox: Diaz vs. Miller	May 5, 2012	Meadowlands Arena	East Rutherford, New Jersey, U.S.	10,788	
202	UFC 145: Jones vs. Evans	Apr 21, 2012	Philips Arena	Atlanta, Georgia, U.S.	15,545	
201	UFC on Fuel TV: Gustafsson vs. Silva	Apr 14, 2012	Avicii Arena	Stockholm, Sweden	15,428	
200	UFC on FX: Alves vs. Kampmann	Mar 3, 2012	Qudos Bank Arena	Sydney, Australia	14,537	
199	UFC 144: Edgar vs. Henderson	Feb 26, 2012	Saitama Super Arena	Saitama, Japan	21,000	
198	UFC on Fuel TV: Sanchez vs. Ellenberger	Feb 15, 2012	Omaha Civic Auditorium	Omaha, Nebraska, U.S.	6,283	
197	UFC 143: Diaz vs. Condit	Feb 4, 2012	Mandalay Bay Events Center	Las Vegas, Nevada, U.S.	9,015	
196	UFC on Fox: Evans vs. Davis	Jan 28, 2012	United Center	Chicago, Illinois, U.S.	16,963	
195	UFC on FX: Guillard vs. Miller	Jan 20, 2012	Bridgestone Arena	Nashville, Tennessee, U.S.	7,728	
194	UFC 142: Aldo vs. Mendes	Jan 14, 2012	HSBC Arena	Rio de Janeiro, Brazil	10,605	
193	UFC 141: Lesnar vs. Overeem	Dec 30, 2011	MGM Grand Garden Arena	Las Vegas, Nevada, U.S.	13,793	
192	UFC 140: Jones vs. Machida	Dec 10, 2011	Scotiabank Arena	Toronto, Ontario, Canada	18,303	
191	The Ultimate Fighter: Team Bisping vs. Team Miller Finale	Dec 3, 2011	Palms Casino Resort	Las Vegas, Nevada, U.S.	1,909	
190	UFC 139: Shogun vs. Henderson	Nov 19, 2011	SAP Center	San Jose, California, U.S.	13,832	
189	UFC on Fox: Velasquez vs. dos Santos	Nov 12, 2011	Honda Center	Anaheim, California, U.S.	11,607	
188	UFC 138: Leben vs. Muñoz	Nov 5, 2011	LG Arena	Birmingham, England	10,823	
187	UFC 137: Penn vs. Diaz	Oct 29, 2011	Mandalay Bay Events Center	Las Vegas, Nevada, U.S.	10,313	
186	UFC 136: Edgar vs. Maynard III	Oct 8, 2011	Toyota Center	Houston, Texas, U.S.	16,164	
185	UFC Live: Cruz vs. Johnson	Oct 1, 2011	Capital One Arena	Washington, D.C., U.S.	9,380	
184	UFC 135: Jones vs. Rampage	Sep 24, 2011	Pepsi Center	Denver, Colorado, U.S.	16,344	
183	UFC Fight Night: Shields vs. Ellenberger	Sep 17, 2011	Ernest N. Morial Convention Center	New Orleans, Louisiana, U.S.	7,112	
182	UFC 134: Silva vs. Okami	Aug 27, 2011	HSBC Arena	Rio de Janeiro, Brazil	14,000	
181	UFC Live: Hardy vs. Lytle	Aug 14, 2011	Bradley Center	Milwaukee, Wisconsin, U.S.	6,751	
180	UFC 133: Evans vs. Ortiz	Aug 6, 2011	Wells Fargo Center	Philadelphia, Pennsylvania, U.S.	11,583	
179	UFC 132: Cruz vs. Faber	Jul 2, 2011	MGM Grand Garden Arena	Las Vegas, Nevada, U.S.	13,109	
178	UFC Live: Kongo vs. Barry	Jun 26, 2011	Consol Energy Center	Pittsburgh, Pennsylvania, U.S.	7,792	
177	UFC 131: dos Santos vs. Carwin	Jun 11, 2011	Rogers Arena	Vancouver, British Columbia, Canada	14,685	
176	The Ultimate Fighter: Team Lesnar vs. Team dos Santos Finale	Jun 4, 2011	Palms Casino Resort	Las Vegas, Nevada, U.S.	2,053	
175	UFC 130: Rampage vs. Hamill	May 28, 2011	MGM Grand Garden Arena	Las Vegas, Nevada, U.S.	12,753	
174	UFC 129: St-Pierre vs. Shields	Apr 30, 2011	Rogers Centre	Toronto, Ontario, Canada	55,724	
173	UFC Fight Night: Nogueira vs. Davis	Mar 26, 2011	Climate Pledge Arena	Seattle, Washington, U.S.	13,741	
172	UFC 128: Shogun vs. Jones	Mar 19, 2011	Prudential Center	Newark, New Jersey, U.S.	12,619	
171	UFC Live: Sanchez vs. Kampmann	Mar 3, 2011	KFC Yum! Center	Louisville, Kentucky, U.S.	8,319	
170	UFC 127: Penn vs. Fitch	Feb 27, 2011	Qudos Bank Arena	Sydney, Australia	18,186	
169	UFC 126: Silva vs. Belfort	Feb 5, 2011	Mandalay Bay Events Center	Las Vegas, Nevada, U.S.	10,893	
168	UFC: Fight for the Troops 2	Jan 22, 2011	Fort Hood	Fort Hood, Texas, U.S.	3,200	
167	UFC 125: Resolution	Jan 1, 2011	MGM Grand Garden Arena	Las Vegas, Nevada, U.S.	12,874	
166	UFC 124: St-Pierre vs. Koscheck 2	Dec 11, 2010	Bell Centre	Montreal, Quebec, Canada	23,152	
165	The Ultimate Fighter: Team GSP vs. Team Koscheck Finale	Dec 4, 2010	Palms Casino Resort	Las Vegas, Nevada, U.S.	1,903	
164	UFC 123: Rampage vs. Machida	Nov 20, 2010	The Palace of Auburn Hills	Auburn Hills, Michigan, U.S.	16,404	
163	UFC 122: Marquardt vs. Okami	Nov 13, 2010	Rudolf Weber-Arena	Oberhausen, Germany	8,421	
162	UFC 121: Lesnar vs. Velasquez	Oct 23, 2010	Honda Center	Anaheim, California, U.S.	14,856	
161	UFC 120: Bisping vs. Akiyama	Oct 16, 2010	The O2 Arena	London, England	17,133	
160	UFC 119: Mir vs. Cro Cop	Sep 25, 2010	Conseco Fieldhouse	Indianapolis, Indiana, U.S.	15,811	
159	UFC Fight Night: Marquardt vs. Palhares	Sep 15, 2010	Frank Erwin Center	Austin, Texas, U.S.	7,724	
158	UFC 118: Edgar vs. Penn 2	Aug 28, 2010	TD Garden	Boston, Massachusetts, U.S.	14,168	
157	UFC 117: Silva vs. Sonnen	Aug 7, 2010	Oracle Arena	Oakland, California, U.S.	12,971	
156	UFC Live: Jones vs. Matyushenko	Aug 1, 2010	Pechanga Arena	San Diego, California, U.S.	8,132	
155	UFC 116: Lesnar vs. Carwin	Jul 3, 2010	MGM Grand Garden Arena	Las Vegas, Nevada, U.S.	12,740	
154	The Ultimate Fighter: Team Liddell vs. Team Ortiz Finale	Jun 19, 2010	Palms Casino Resort	Las Vegas, Nevada, U.S.	1,708	
153	UFC 115: Liddell vs. Franklin	Jun 12, 2010	General Motors Place	Vancouver, British Columbia, Canada	17,669	
152	UFC 114: Rampage vs. Evans	May 29, 2010	MGM Grand Garden Arena	Las Vegas, Nevada, U.S.	14,996	
151	UFC 113: Machida vs. Shogun 2	May 8, 2010	Bell Centre	Montreal, Quebec, Canada	17,647	
150	UFC 112: Invincible	Apr 10, 2010	Concert Arena, Yas Island	Abu Dhabi, United Arab Emirates	11,008	
149	UFC Fight Night: Florian vs. Gomi	Mar 31, 2010	Bojangles Coliseum	Charlotte, North Carolina, U.S.	7,700	
148	UFC 111: St-Pierre vs. Hardy	Mar 27, 2010	Prudential Center	Newark, New Jersey, U.S.	17,000	
147	UFC Live: Vera vs. Jones	Mar 21, 2010	1stBank Center	Broomfield, Colorado, U.S.	6,443	
146	UFC 110: Nogueira vs. Velasquez	Feb 21, 2010	Qudos Bank Arena	Sydney, Australia	17,831	
145	UFC 109: Relentless	Feb 6, 2010	Mandalay Bay Events Center	Las Vegas, Nevada, U.S.	10,753	
144	UFC Fight Night: Maynard vs. Diaz	Jan 11, 2010	Patriot Center	Fairfax, Virginia, U.S.	8,078	
143	UFC 108: Evans vs. Silva	Jan 2, 2010	MGM Grand Garden Arena	Las Vegas, Nevada, U.S.	13,529	
142	UFC 107: Penn vs. Sanchez	Dec 12, 2009	FedExForum	Memphis, Tennessee, U.S.	13,896	
141	The Ultimate Fighter: Heavyweights Finale	Dec 5, 2009	Palms Casino Resort	Las Vegas, Nevada, U.S.	1,791	
140	UFC 106: Ortiz vs. Griffin 2	Nov 21, 2009	Mandalay Bay Events Center	Las Vegas, Nevada, U.S.	10,529	
139	UFC 105: Couture vs. Vera	Nov 14, 2009	Manchester Evening News Arena	Manchester, England	16,693	
138	UFC 104: Machida vs. Shogun	Oct 24, 2009	Crypto.com Arena	Los Angeles, California, U.S.	14,892	
137	UFC 103: Franklin vs. Belfort	Sep 19, 2009	American Airlines Center	Dallas, Texas, U.S.	17,428	
136	UFC Fight Night: Diaz vs. Guillard	Sep 16, 2009	Cox Convention Center	Oklahoma City, Oklahoma, U.S.	9,490	
135	UFC 102: Couture vs. Nogueira	Aug 29, 2009	Rose Garden	Portland, Oregon, U.S.	16,088	
134	UFC 101: Declaration	Aug 8, 2009	Wachovia Center	Philadelphia, Pennsylvania, U.S.	17,411	
133	UFC 100	Jul 11, 2009	Mandalay Bay Events Center	Las Vegas, Nevada, U.S.	10,871	
132	The Ultimate Fighter: United States vs. United Kingdom Finale	Jun 20, 2009	Palms Casino Resort	Las Vegas, Nevada, U.S.	2,217	
131	UFC 99: The Comeback	Jun 13, 2009	Lanxess Arena	Cologne, Germany	12,854	
130	UFC 98: Evans vs. Machida	May 23, 2009	MGM Grand Garden Arena	Las Vegas, Nevada, U.S.	12,606	
129	UFC 97: Redemption	Apr 18, 2009	Bell Centre	Montreal, Quebec, Canada	21,451	
128	UFC Fight Night: Condit vs. Kampmann	Apr 1, 2009	Sommet Center	Nashville, Tennessee, U.S.	10,267	
127	UFC 96: Jackson vs. Jardine	Mar 7, 2009	Nationwide Arena	Columbus, Ohio, U.S.	17,033	
126	UFC 95: Sanchez vs. Stevenson	Feb 21, 2009	The O2 Arena	London, England	13,268	
125	UFC Fight Night: Lauzon vs. Stephens	Feb 7, 2009	USF Sun Dome	Tampa, Florida, U.S.	7,596	
124	UFC 94: St-Pierre vs. Penn 2	Jan 31, 2009	MGM Grand Garden Arena	Las Vegas, Nevada, U.S.	14,885	
123	UFC 93: Franklin vs. Henderson	Jan 17, 2009	3Arena	Dublin, Ireland	9,369	
122	UFC 92: The Ultimate 2008	Dec 27, 2008	MGM Grand Garden Arena	Las Vegas, Nevada, U.S.	14,166	
121	The Ultimate Fighter: Team Nogueira vs. Team Mir Finale	Dec 13, 2008	Palms Casino Resort	Las Vegas, Nevada, U.S.	1,853	
120	UFC: Fight for the Troops	Dec 10, 2008	Crown Coliseum	Fayetteville, North Carolina, U.S.	8,500	
119	UFC 91: Couture vs. Lesnar	Nov 15, 2008	MGM Grand Garden Arena	Las Vegas, Nevada, U.S.	14,272	
118	UFC 90: Silva vs. Côté	Oct 25, 2008	Allstate Arena	Rosemont, Illinois, U.S.	15,359	
117	UFC 89: Bisping vs. Leben	Oct 18, 2008	National Indoor Arena	Birmingham, England	9,515	
116	UFC Fight Night: Diaz vs. Neer	Sep 17, 2008	Omaha Civic Auditorium	Omaha, Nebraska, U.S.	9,103	
115	UFC 88: Breakthrough	Sep 6, 2008	State Farm Arena	Atlanta, Georgia, U.S.	14,736	
114	UFC 87: Seek and Destroy	Aug 9, 2008	Target Center	Minneapolis, Minnesota, U.S.	15,087	
113	UFC Fight Night: Silva vs. Irvin	Jul 19, 2008	Palms Casino Resort	Las Vegas, Nevada, U.S.	2,071	
112	UFC 86: Jackson vs. Griffin	Jul 5, 2008	Mandalay Bay Events Center	Las Vegas, Nevada, U.S.	10,990	
111	The Ultimate Fighter: Team Rampage vs. Team Forrest Finale	Jun 21, 2008	Palms Casino Resort	Las Vegas, Nevada, U.S.	1,853	
110	UFC 85: Bedlam	Jun 7, 2008	The O2 Arena	London, England	15,327	
109	UFC 84: Ill Will	May 24, 2008	MGM Grand Garden Arena	Las Vegas, Nevada, U.S.	14,773	
108	UFC 83: Serra vs. St-Pierre 2	Apr 19, 2008	Bell Centre	Montreal, Quebec, Canada	21,390	
107	UFC Fight Night: Florian vs. Lauzon	Apr 2, 2008	Broomfield Event Center	Broomfield, Colorado, U.S.	6,742	
106	UFC 82: Pride of a Champion	Mar 1, 2008	Nationwide Arena	Columbus, Ohio, U.S.	16,431	
105	UFC 81: Breaking Point	Feb 2, 2008	Mandalay Bay Events Center	Las Vegas, Nevada, U.S.	10,583	
104	UFC Fight Night: Swick vs. Burkman	Jan 23, 2008	Palms Casino Resort	Las Vegas, Nevada, U.S.	1,900	
103	UFC 80: Rapid Fire	Jan 19, 2008	Metro Radio Arena	Newcastle upon Tyne, England	8,412	
102	UFC 79: Nemesis	Dec 29, 2007	Mandalay Bay Events Center	Las Vegas, Nevada, U.S.	11,075	
101	The Ultimate Fighter: Team Hughes vs. Team Serra Finale	Dec 8, 2007	Palms Casino Resort	Las Vegas, Nevada, U.S.	—N/a	
100	UFC 78: Validation	Nov 17, 2007	Prudential Center	Newark, New Jersey, U.S.	14,071	
099	UFC 77: Hostile Territory	Oct 20, 2007	U.S. Bank Arena	Cincinnati, Ohio, U.S.	16,054	
098	UFC 76: Knockout	Sep 22, 2007	Honda Center	Anaheim, California, U.S.	13,770	
097	UFC Fight Night: Thomas vs. Florian	Sep 19, 2007	Palms Casino Resort	Las Vegas, Nevada, U.S.	—N/a	
096	UFC 75: Champion vs. Champion	Sep 8, 2007	The O2 Arena	London, England	16,235	
095	UFC 74: Respect	Aug 25, 2007	Mandalay Bay Events Center	Las Vegas, Nevada, U.S.	11,065	
094	UFC 73: Stacked	Jul 7, 2007	ARCO Arena	Sacramento, California, U.S.	13,183	
093	The Ultimate Fighter: Team Pulver vs. Team Penn Finale	Jun 23, 2007	Palms Casino Resort	Las Vegas, Nevada, U.S.	—N/a	
092	UFC 72: Victory	Jun 16, 2007	The Odyssey	Belfast, Northern Ireland	7,850	
091	UFC Fight Night: Stout vs. Fisher	Jun 12, 2007	Seminole Hard Rock Hotel and Casino	Hollywood, Florida, U.S.	—N/a	
090	UFC 71: Liddell vs. Jackson	May 26, 2007	MGM Grand Garden Arena	Las Vegas, Nevada, U.S.	14,728	
089	UFC 70: Nations Collide	Apr 21, 2007	Manchester Evening News Arena	Manchester, England	15,114	
088	UFC 69: Shootout	Apr 7, 2007	Toyota Center	Houston, Texas, U.S.	15,269	
087	UFC Fight Night: Stevenson vs. Guillard	Apr 5, 2007	Palms Casino Resort	Las Vegas, Nevada, U.S.	1,734	
086	UFC 68: The Uprising	Mar 3, 2007	Nationwide Arena	Columbus, Ohio, U.S.	19,079	
085	UFC 67: All or Nothing	Feb 3, 2007	Mandalay Bay Events Center	Las Vegas, Nevada, U.S.	10,787	
084	UFC Fight Night: Evans vs. Salmon	Jan 25, 2007	Seminole Hard Rock Hotel and Casino	Hollywood, Florida, U.S.	5,287	
083	UFC 66: Liddell vs. Ortiz	Dec 30, 2006	MGM Grand Garden Arena	Las Vegas, Nevada, U.S.	13,671	
082	UFC Fight Night: Sanchez vs. Riggs	Dec 13, 2006	Marine Corps Air Station Miramar	San Diego, California, U.S.	3,000	
081	UFC 65: Bad Intentions	Nov 18, 2006	ARCO Arena	Sacramento, California, U.S.	14,666	
080	The Ultimate Fighter: The Comeback Finale	Nov 11, 2006	Hard Rock Hotel and Casino	Las Vegas, Nevada, U.S.	1,000	
079	UFC 64: Unstoppable	Oct 14, 2006	Mandalay Bay Events Center	Las Vegas, Nevada, U.S.	10,173	
078	UFC Fight Night 6.5	Oct 10, 2006	Seminole Hard Rock Hotel and Casino	Hollywood, Florida, U.S.	3,510	
077	UFC 63: Hughes vs. Penn	Sep 23, 2006	Honda Center	Anaheim, California, U.S.	12,604	
076	UFC 62: Liddell vs. Sobral	Aug 26, 2006	Mandalay Bay Events Center	Las Vegas, Nevada, U.S.	10,503	
075	UFC Fight Night 6	Aug 17, 2006	Red Rock Resort Spa and Casino	Summerlin, Nevada, U.S.	1,412	
074	UFC 61: Bitter Rivals	Jul 8, 2006	Mandalay Bay Events Center	Las Vegas, Nevada, U.S.	11,167	
073	UFC Ultimate Fight Night 5	Jun 28, 2006	Hard Rock Hotel and Casino	Las Vegas, Nevada, U.S.	606	
072	The Ultimate Fighter: Team Ortiz vs. Team Shamrock Finale	Jun 24, 2006	Hard Rock Hotel and Casino	Las Vegas, Nevada, U.S.	849	
071	UFC 60: Hughes vs. Gracie	May 27, 2006	Staples Center	Los Angeles, California, U.S.	14,765	
070	UFC 59: Reality Check	Apr 15, 2006	Honda Center	Anaheim, California, U.S.	13,814	
069	UFC Ultimate Fight Night 4	Apr 6, 2006	Hard Rock Hotel and Casino	Las Vegas, Nevada, U.S.	843	
068	UFC 58: USA vs. Canada	Mar 4, 2006	Mandalay Bay Events Center	Las Vegas, Nevada, U.S.	9,569	
067	UFC 57: Liddell vs. Couture 3	Feb 4, 2006	Mandalay Bay Events Center	Las Vegas, Nevada, U.S.	10,659	
066	UFC Ultimate Fight Night 3	Jan 16, 2006	Hard Rock Hotel and Casino	Las Vegas, Nevada, U.S.	1,008	
065	UFC 56: Full Force	Nov 19, 2005	MGM Grand Garden Arena	Las Vegas, Nevada, U.S.	12,000	
064	The Ultimate Fighter: Team Hughes vs. Team Franklin Finale	Nov 5, 2005	Hard Rock Hotel and Casino	Las Vegas, Nevada, U.S.	—N/a	
063	UFC 55: Fury	Oct 7, 2005	Mohegan Sun Arena	Montville, Connecticut, U.S.	8,000	
062	UFC Ultimate Fight Night 2	Oct 3, 2005	Hard Rock Hotel and Casino	Las Vegas, Nevada, U.S.	—N/a	
061	UFC 54: Boiling Point	Aug 20, 2005	MGM Grand Garden Arena	Las Vegas, Nevada, U.S.	13,520	
060	UFC Ultimate Fight Night	Aug 6, 2005	Cox Pavilion	Las Vegas, Nevada, U.S.	—N/a	
059	UFC 53: Heavy Hitters	Jun 4, 2005	Boardwalk Hall	Atlantic City, New Jersey, U.S.	12,000	
058	UFC 52: Couture vs. Liddell	Apr 16, 2005	MGM Grand Garden Arena	Las Vegas, Nevada, U.S.	14,562	
057	The Ultimate Fighter: Team Couture vs. Team Liddell Finale	Apr 9, 2005	Cox Pavilion	Las Vegas, Nevada, U.S.	—N/a	
056	UFC 51: Super Saturday	Feb 5, 2005	Mandalay Bay Events Center	Las Vegas, Nevada, U.S.	11,072	
055	UFC 50: The War of '04	Oct 22, 2004	Boardwalk Hall	Atlantic City, New Jersey, U.S.	9,000	
054	UFC 49: Unfinished Business	Aug 21, 2004	MGM Grand Garden Arena	Las Vegas, Nevada, U.S.	12,100	
053	UFC 48: Payback	Jun 19, 2004	Mandalay Bay Events Center	Las Vegas, Nevada, U.S.	10,000	
052	UFC 47: It's On!	Apr 2, 2004	Mandalay Bay Events Center	Las Vegas, Nevada, U.S.	11,437	
051	UFC 46: Supernatural	Jan 31, 2004	Mandalay Bay Events Center	Las Vegas, Nevada, U.S.	10,700	
050	UFC 45: Revolution	Nov 21, 2003	Mohegan Sun Arena	Montville, Connecticut, U.S.	9,200	
049	UFC 44: Undisputed	Sep 26, 2003	Mandalay Bay Events Center	Las Vegas, Nevada, U.S.	10,400	
048	UFC 43: Meltdown	Jun 6, 2003	Thomas & Mack Center	Las Vegas, Nevada, U.S.	9,800	
047	UFC 42: Sudden Impact	Apr 25, 2003	American Airlines Arena	Miami, Florida, U.S.	7,500	
046	UFC 41: Onslaught	Feb 28, 2003	Boardwalk Hall	Atlantic City, New Jersey, U.S.	11,707	
045	UFC 40: Vendetta	Nov 22, 2002	MGM Grand Garden Arena	Las Vegas, Nevada, U.S.	13,770	
044	UFC 39: The Warriors Return	Sep 27, 2002	Mohegan Sun Arena	Montville, Connecticut, U.S.	7,800	
043	UFC 38: Brawl at the Hall	Jul 13, 2002	Royal Albert Hall	London, England	5,000	
042	UFC 37.5: As Real As It Gets	Jun 22, 2002	Bellagio	Las Vegas, Nevada, U.S.	3,700	
041	UFC 37: High Impact	May 10, 2002	CenturyTel Center	Bossier City, Louisiana, U.S.	7,200	
040	UFC 36: Worlds Collide	Mar 22, 2002	MGM Grand Garden Arena	Las Vegas, Nevada, U.S.	10,000	
039	UFC 35: Throwdown	Jan 11, 2002	Mohegan Sun Arena	Uncasville, Connecticut, U.S.	9,600	
038	UFC 34: High Voltage	Nov 2, 2001	MGM Grand Garden Arena	Las Vegas, Nevada, U.S.	9,000	
037	UFC 33: Victory in Vegas	Sep 28, 2001	Mandalay Bay Events Center	Las Vegas, Nevada, U.S.	9,500	
036	UFC 32: Showdown in the Meadowlands	Jun 29, 2001	Continental Airlines Arena	East Rutherford, New Jersey, U.S.	12,500	
035	UFC 31: Locked and Loaded	May 4, 2001	Etess Arena at Trump Taj Mahal	Atlantic City, New Jersey, U.S.	—N/a	
034	UFC 30: Battle on the Boardwalk	Feb 23, 2001	Etess Arena at Trump Taj Mahal	Atlantic City, New Jersey, U.S.	3,000	
033	UFC 29: Defense of the Belts	Dec 16, 2000	Differ Ariake Arena	Tokyo, Japan	1,414	
032	UFC 28: High Stakes	Nov 17, 2000	Etess Arena at Trump Taj Mahal	Atlantic City, New Jersey, U.S.	—N/a	
031	UFC 27: Ultimate Bad Boyz	Sep 22, 2000	Lakefront Arena	New Orleans, Louisiana, U.S.	—N/a	
030	UFC 26: Ultimate Field of Dreams	Jun 9, 2000	Five Seasons Events Center	Cedar Rapids, Iowa, U.S.	1,100	
029	UFC 25: Ultimate Japan 3	Apr 14, 2000	Yoyogi National Gymnasium	Tokyo, Japan	—N/a	
028	UFC 24: First Defense	Mar 10, 2000	Lake Charles Civic Center	Lake Charles, Louisiana, U.S.	—N/a	
027	UFC 23: Ultimate Japan 2	Nov 19, 1999	Tokyo Bay NK Hall	Chiba, Japan	—N/a	
026	UFC 22: Only One Can be Champion	Sep 24, 1999	Lake Charles Civic Center	Lake Charles, Louisiana, U.S.	—N/a	
025	UFC 21: Return of the Champions	Jul 16, 1999	Five Seasons Events Center	Cedar Rapids, Iowa, U.S.	—N/a	
024	UFC 20: Battle for the Gold	May 7, 1999	Boutwell Memorial Auditorium	Birmingham, Alabama, U.S.	—N/a	
023	UFC 19: Ultimate Young Guns	Mar 5, 1999	Casino Magic Bay St. Louis	Bay St. Louis, Mississippi, U.S.	—N/a	
022	UFC 18: The Road to the Heavyweight Title	Jan 8, 1999	Pontchartrain Center	New Orleans, Louisiana, U.S.	—N/a	
021	UFC Brazil: Ultimate Brazil	Oct 16, 1998	Ginásio da Portuguesa	São Paulo, Brazil	—N/a	
020	UFC 17: Redemption	May 15, 1998	Mobile Civic Center	Mobile, Alabama, U.S.	—N/a	
019	UFC 16: Battle in the Bayou	Mar 13, 1998	Pontchartrain Center	New Orleans, Louisiana, U.S.	4,600	
018	UFC Japan: Ultimate Japan	Dec 21, 1997	Yokohama Arena	Yokohama, Japan	5,000	
017	UFC 15: Collision Course	Oct 17, 1997	Casino Magic Bay St. Louis	Bay St. Louis, Mississippi, U.S.	—N/a	
016	UFC 14: Showdown	Jul 27, 1997	Boutwell Memorial Auditorium	Birmingham, Alabama, U.S.	5,000	
015	UFC 13: The Ultimate Force	May 30, 1997	Augusta Civic Center	Augusta, Georgia, U.S.	5,100	
014	UFC 12: Judgement Day	Feb 7, 1997	Dothan Civic Center	Dothan, Alabama, U.S.	3,100	
013	UFC: The Ultimate Ultimate 2	Dec 7, 1996	Fair Park Arena	Birmingham, Alabama, U.S.	6,000	
012	UFC 11: The Proving Ground	Sep 20, 1996	Augusta Civic Center	Augusta, Georgia, U.S.	4,500	
011	UFC 10: The Tournament	Jul 12, 1996	Fair Park Arena	Birmingham, Alabama, U.S.	4,300	
010	UFC 9: Motor City Madness	May 17, 1996	Cobo Arena	Detroit, Michigan, U.S.	10,000	
009	UFC 8: David vs. Goliath	Feb 16, 1996	Coliseo Rubén Rodríguez	Bayamón, Puerto Rico	13,000	
008	UFC: The Ultimate Ultimate	Dec 16, 1995	Mammoth Gardens	Denver, Colorado, U.S.	2,800	
007	UFC 7: The Brawl in Buffalo	Sep 8, 1995	Buffalo Memorial Auditorium	Buffalo, New York, U.S.	9,000	
006	UFC 6: Clash of the Titans	Jul 14, 1995	Casper Events Center	Casper, Wyoming, U.S.	2,700	
005	UFC 5: The Return of the Beast	Apr 7, 1995	Independence Arena	Charlotte, North Carolina, U.S.	6,000	
004	UFC 4: Revenge of the Warriors	Dec 16, 1994	Expo Square Pavilion	Tulsa, Oklahoma, U.S.	5,857	
003	UFC 3: The American Dream	Sep 9, 1994	Grady Cole Center	Charlotte, North Carolina, U.S.	3,000	
002	UFC 2: No Way Out	Mar 11, 1994	Mammoth Gardens	Denver, Colorado, U.S.	2,000	
001	UFC 1: The Beginning	Nov 12, 1993	McNichols Sports Arena	Denver, Colorado, U.S.	7,800	

== Number of events by year ==
Number of Events by Year
Year	Number of Events	Yearly Difference
2025	42	0
2024	42	−1
2023	43	+1
2022	42	−1
2021	43	+2
2020	41	-1
2019	42	+3
2018	39	0
2017	39	−2
2016	41	0
2015	41	−5
2014	46	+13
2013	33	+2
2012	31	+4
2011	27	+3
2010	24	+4
2009	20	0
2008	20	+1
2007	19	+1
2006	18	+8
2005	10	+5
2004	5	0
2003	5	−2
2002	7	+2
2001	5	−1
2000	6	0
1999	6	+3
1998	3	−2
1997	5	0
1996	5	+1
1995	4	+1
1994	3	+2
1993	1	–

== Event locations ==
- The following cities have hosted a total of 799 UFC events as of UFC Fight Night: Procházka vs. Stirling
United States (total: 562)
- Las Vegas, Nevada (278)
  - Meta Apex (131)
  - MGM Grand Garden Arena (43)
  - T-Mobile Arena (37)
  - Michelob Ultra Arena (30)
  - Palms Casino Resort (19)
  - Hard Rock Hotel and Casino (8)
  - The Chelsea at The Cosmopolitan (2)
  - Cox Pavilion (2)
  - Bellagio (1)
  - Park MGM (1)
  - Red Rock Resort Spa and Casino (1)
  - Sphere (1)
  - The Theater at Virgin Hotels (1)
  - Thomas & Mack Center (1)
- New York City, New York (13)
  - Madison Square Garden, Manhattan (10)
  - Barclays Center, Brooklyn (3)
- Newark, New Jersey (12)
- Anaheim, California (10)
- Atlantic City, New Jersey (10)
- Houston, Texas (10)
- Denver, Colorado (8)
- Chicago, Illinois (8)
- Sacramento, California (7)
- Boston, Massachusetts (7)
- Nashville, Tennessee (7)
- Los Angeles, California (6)
- Jacksonville, Florida (6)
- New Orleans, Louisiana (6)
- Dallas, Texas (6)
- Miami, Florida (5)
- Atlanta, Georgia (5)
- Charlotte, North Carolina (5)
- Austin, Texas (5)
- Salt Lake City, Utah (5)
- Seattle, Washington (5)
- Birmingham, Alabama (4)
- Phoenix, Arizona (4)
- San Diego, California (4)
- San Jose, California (4)
- Uncasville, Connecticut (4)
- Hollywood, Florida (4)
- Orlando, Florida (4)
- Tampa, Florida (4)
- Columbus, Ohio (4)
- Philadelphia, Pennsylvania (4)
- San Antonio, Texas (4)
- Glendale, Arizona (3)
- Inglewood, California (3)
- Broomfield, Colorado (3)
- Washington, District of Columbia (3)
- Minneapolis, Minnesota (3)
- Kansas City, Missouri (3)
- Oklahoma City, Oklahoma (3)
- Pittsburgh, Pennsylvania (3)
- Fairfax, Virginia (3)
- Milwaukee, Wisconsin (3)
- Sunrise, Florida (2)
- Augusta, Georgia (2)
- Indianapolis, Indiana (2)
- Cedar Rapids, Iowa (2)
- Louisville, Kentucky (2)
- Lake Charles, Louisiana (2)
- Detroit, Michigan (2)
- Bay St. Louis, Mississippi (2)
- St. Louis, Missouri (2)
- Omaha, Nebraska (2)
- East Rutherford, New Jersey (2)
- Buffalo, New York (2)
- Cincinnati, Ohio (2)
- Tulsa, Oklahoma (2)
- Portland, Oregon (2)
- Norfolk, Virginia (2)
- Dothan, Alabama (1)
- Mobile, Alabama (1)
- Fresno, California (1)
- Oakland, California (1)
- Mashantucket, Connecticut (1)
- Duluth, Georgia (1)
- Boise, Idaho (1)
- Rosemont, Illinois (1)
- Des Moines, Iowa (1)
- Wichita, Kansas (1)
- Fort Campbell, Kentucky (1)
- Bossier City, Louisiana (1)
- Bangor, Maine (1)
- Baltimore, Maryland (1)
- Auburn Hills, Michigan (1)
- Lincoln, Nebraska (1)
- Albuquerque, New Mexico (1)
- Rio Rancho, New Mexico (1)
- Albany, New York (1)
- Elmont, New York (1)
- Rochester, New York (1)
- Uniondale, New York (1)
- Utica, New York (1)
- Fayetteville, North Carolina (1)
- Raleigh, North Carolina (1)
- Cleveland, Ohio (1)
- Greenville, South Carolina (1)
- Sioux Falls, South Dakota (1)
- Memphis, Tennessee (1)
- Fort Hood, Texas (1)
- Hidalgo, Texas (1)
- Casper, Wyoming (1)

Brazil (total: 41)

- Rio de Janeiro (13)
- São Paulo (9)
- Brasília (3)
- Fortaleza (3)
- Barueri (2)
- Belo Horizonte (2)
- Goiânia (2)
- Jaraguá do Sul (2)
- Belém (1)
- Curitiba (1)
- Natal (1)
- Porto Alegre (1)
- Uberlândia (1)

Canada (total: 38)

- Montréal, Québec (8)
- Vancouver, British Columbia (7)
- Toronto, Ontario (7)
- Edmonton, Alberta (4)
- Winnipeg, Manitoba (3)
- Calgary, Alberta (2)
- Halifax, Nova Scotia (2)
- Ottawa, Ontario (2)
- Moncton, New Brunswick (1)
- Québec City, Québec (1)
- Saskatoon, Saskatchewan (1)

United Kingdom (total: 31)

- London, England (17)
- Manchester, England (5)
- Birmingham, England (2)
- Belfast, Northern Ireland (2)
- Glasgow, Scotland (2)
- Liverpool, England (1)
- Newcastle upon Tyne, England (1)
- Nottingham, England (1)

United Arab Emirates (total: 24)

- Abu Dhabi (24)

Australia (total: 22)

- Sydney (8)
- Perth (5)
- Melbourne (4)
- Adelaide (2)
- Brisbane (2)
- Gold Coast (1)

China (total: 10)

- Macau SAR (5)
- Shanghai (3)
- Beijing (1)
- Shenzhen (1)

Japan (total: 9)

- Saitama (5)
- Tokyo (2)
- Chiba (1)
- Yokohama (1)

Mexico (total: 9)

- Mexico City (8)
- Monterrey (1)

Germany (total: 6)

- Berlin (2)
- Hamburg (2)
- Cologne (1)
- Oberhausen (1)

Singapore (total: 6)

- Kallang (5)
- Marina Bay (1)

Sweden (total: 6)

- Stockholm (6)

France (total: 5)

- Paris (5)

Ireland (total: 3)

- Dublin (3)

New Zealand (total: 3)

- Auckland (3)

Russia (total: 3)

- Moscow (2)
- Saint Petersburg (1)

Azerbaijan (total: 2)

- Baku (2)

Netherlands (total: 2)

- Rotterdam (2)

Poland (total: 2)

- Gdańsk (1)
- Kraków (1)

Qatar (total: 2)

- Al Rayyan (2)

Saudi Arabia (total: 2)

- Riyadh (2)

South Korea (total: 2)

- Busan (1)
- Seoul (1)

Argentina (total: 1)

- Buenos Aires (1)

Chile (total: 1)

- Santiago (1)

Croatia (total: 1)

- Zagreb (1)

Czech Republic (total: 1)

- Prague (1)

Denmark (total: 1)

- Copenhagen (1)

Philippines (total: 1)

- Pasay (1)

Puerto Rico (total: 1)

- Bayamón (1)

Serbia (total: 1)

- Belgrade (1)

Uruguay (total: 1)

- Montevideo (1)

== See also ==
- List of current UFC fighters
- List of UFC bonus award recipients
