= List of UFC bonus award recipients =

UFC Bonus Awards are three separate cash bonuses usually awarded to four fighters after each UFC event, based on internal decisions by UFC management. More/fewer bonuses have been awarded at some events, especially when no knockouts or submissions occurred.

- Fight of the Night: Awarded to the two fighters who delivered the most impressive fight on the card.
- Knockout of the Night: Awarded to the fighter with the most impressive knockout/technical knockout.
- Submission of the Night: Awarded to the fighter with the most impressive submission.
- Performance of the Night: On February 11, 2014, the UFC announced a modification to its live event bonuses. Since UFC Fight Night 36, UFC has awarded Fight of the Night Bonuses to each of the fighters in the best fight of the night, as well as additional Performance of the Night Bonuses. The Performance of the Night bonuses are awarded to the athletes who put on the best and most exciting individual performances. The Submission of the Night and the Knockout of the Night bonuses have been discontinued and the bonus amounts remained $50,000 until January 2026.
- Post-Fight bonus increase: Beginning in January 2026, starting with UFC 324, the UFC increased its post‑fight bonus structure, raising Performance of the Night and Fight of the Night awards from $50,000 to $100,000, and introducing additional $25,000 bonuses for any knockout or submission not selected among the standard four post‑fight awards.

== Fighters with the most awards ==
Currently on the UFC Roster
No Longer with the UFC
Retired
Most All Time

=== Male award recipients (with eight or more awards) ===
Fighter	Fight of the Night	Knockout of the Night	Submission of the Night	Performance of the Night	Total
Charles Oliveira	4	0	3	14	21
Donald Cerrone	6	3	2	7	18
Justin Gaethje	11	0	0	6	17
Nate Diaz	8	1	5	2	16
Jim Miller	7	0	3	6	16
Joe Lauzon	7	1	6	1	15
Dustin Poirier	10	0	1	4	15
Anderson Silva	5	7	2	0	14
Max Holloway	7	1	0	5	13
Edson Barboza	10	1	0	2	13
Tony Ferguson	6	1	1	3	11
Frankie Edgar	8	1	0	2	11
Cub Swanson	8	2	0	1	11
Chris Lytle	6	1	3	0	10
Jeremy Stephens	6	3	0	1	10
Conor McGregor	2	1	0	7	10
Clay Guida	6	0	3	1	10
Glover Teixeira	4	1	1	4	10
Jon Jones	5	1	2	2	10
Kevin Holland	1	0	0	9	10
Drew Dober	5	0	0	5	10
Lyoto Machida	3	4	0	2	9
Demetrious Johnson	3	1	1	4	9
Stipe Miocic	3	1	0	5	9
Yair Rodríguez	5	0	0	4	9
Matt Brown	4	1	0	4	9
Chan Sung Jung	3	1	2	3	9
Sean O'Malley	3	0	0	6	9
Robert Whittaker	5	0	0	4	9
Vicente Luque	4	0	0	5	9
King Green	4	0	1	4	9
Stephen Thompson	3	1	0	5	9
Anthony Johnson	1	2	0	5	8
T.J. Dillashaw	3	0	0	5	8
Maurício Rua	4	3	0	1	8
Stefan Struve	2	1	3	2	8
Diego Sanchez	7	0	0	1	8
Anthony Pettis	2	2	1	3	8
Yoel Romero	5	1	0	2	8
Demian Maia	2	0	4	2	8
Ovince Saint Preux	1	0	0	7	8
Rafael dos Anjos	3	0	1	4	8
Marlon Vera	3	0	0	5	8
Kelvin Gastelum	5	0	0	3	8
Israel Adesanya	2	0	0	6	8
Alex Caceres	4	0	2	2	8
Paul Craig	0	0	0	8	8
Derrick Lewis	3	0	0	5	8
Brian Ortega	5	0	0	3	8
Jared Cannonier	4	0	0	4	8
Jiří Procházka	3	0	0	5	8
Rafael Fiziev	4	0	0	4	8
Carlos Diego Ferreira	4	0	0	4	8
Song Yadong	1	0	0	7	8

=== Female award recipients (with three or more awards) ===
Fighter	Fight of the Night	Performance of the Night	Total
Jéssica Andrade	5	6	11
Ronda Rousey	2	5 (Note: includes one Submission of the Night award)	7
Mackenzie Dern	3	4	7
Rose Namajunas	3	3	6
Amanda Nunes	0	5	5
Zhang Weili	1	4	5
Miesha Tate	2	3	5
Irene Aldana	3	2	5
Angela Hill	4	1	5
Carli Judice	1	3	4
Holly Holm	2	2	4
Joanna Jędrzejczyk	3	1	4
Mayra Bueno Silva	2	2	4
Molly McCann	1	3	4
Cláudia Gadelha	2	1	3
Valentina Shevchenko	0	3	3
Cortney Casey	2	1	3
Carla Esparza	1	2	3
Jessica Penne	2	1	3
Maryna Moroz	1	2	3
Tatiana Suarez	0	3	3
Marina Rodriguez	1	2	3
Amanda Lemos	2	1	3
Macy Chiasson	0	3	3
Jasmine Jasudavicius	0	3	3
Alexa Grasso	1	2	3

== Award recipients ==
Event	Fight of the Night			Performance of the Night		Bonus	Ref.
UFC Fight Night 294	—N/a			Navajo Stirling	Amir Albazi	$100,000	
UFC Fight Night 294	—N/a			Diyar Nurgozhay	John Mitchell	$100,000	
UFC 334	Ciryl Gane	vs.	Josh Hokit	Kayla Harrison	Stephen Thompson	$100,000	
UFC Fight Night 293	Johnny Walker	vs.	Waldo Cortes-Acosta	Elijah Smith	Thomas Petersen	$100,000	
UFC Fight Night 292	—N/a			Tom Nolan	Julian Erosa	$100,000	
UFC Fight Night 292	—N/a			Joseph Kropschot	Lucia Szabová	$100,000	
UFC 333	Petr Yan	vs.	Merab Dvalishvili	Alexander Volkanovski	Lone'er Kavanagh	$100,000	
UFC Fight Night 291	—N/a			Mike Malott	Marc-André Barriault	$100,000	
UFC Fight Night 291	—N/a			Mandel Nallo	Joel Faglier	$100,000	
UFC Fight Night 290	—N/a			Brendan Allen	Andre Fili	$100,000	
UFC Fight Night 290	—N/a			Otari Tanzilovi	Alice Pereira	$100,000	
UFC 332	—N/a			Roman Kopylov	Imanol Rodríguez	$100,000	
UFC 332	—N/a			Damian Pinas	Johnny Walker	$100,000	
UFC Fight Night 289	Raul Rosas Jr.	vs.	Raoni Barcelos	Yazmin Jauregui	Luis Hernandez	$100,000	
UFC 331	Joshua Van	vs.	Alexandre Pantoja	Arman Tsarukyan	Casey O'Neill	$100,000^{19}	
UFC Fight Night 288	Tommy McMillen	vs.	Marwan Rahiki	Jean Silva	Sean King III	$100,000	
UFC Fight Night 287	—N/a			Salahdine Parnasse	Axel Sola	$100,000	
UFC Fight Night 287	—N/a			Losene Keita	Mário Pinto	$100,000	
UFC Fight Night 286	Liu Ce	vs.	Levi Rodrigues Jr.	Song Yadong	Bilal Hasan	$100,000	
UFC Fight Night 285	Gregory Rodrigues	vs.	Anthony Hernandez	MarQuel Mederos	Carli Judice	$100,000	
UFC 330	—N/a			Jalin Turner	Dustin Stoltzfus	$100,000	
UFC 330	—N/a			Charles Johnson	Jeremiah Wells	$100,000	
UFC Fight Night 284	Carlos Diego Ferreira	vs.	Billy Quarantillo	Quillan Salkilld	Ty Miller	$100,000	
UFC Fight Night 283	—N/a			Uroš Medić	Navajo Stirling	$100,000	
UFC Fight Night 283	—N/a			Gilbert Urbina	Nina Nikolija Milošević	$100,000	
UFC Fight Night 282	Rizvan Kuniev	vs.	Tyrell Fortune	Ramazan Temirov	Valter Walker	$100,000	
UFC Fight Night 281	Dricus du Plessis	vs.	Kamaru Usman	Tommy McMillen	Felipe Franco	$100,000	
UFC 329	Brandon Royval	vs.	Lone'er Kavanagh	Paddy Pimblett	King Green	$100,000	
UFC Fight Night 280	—N/a			Rafael Fiziev	Asu Almabayev	$100,000	
UFC Fight Night 280	—N/a			Abdul-Rakhman Yakhyaev	Daniil Donchenko	$100,000	
UFC Fight Night 279	Vinicius Oliveira	vs.	Andre Fili	Manel Kape	Murtazali Magomedov	$100,000	
UFC Freedom 250	Justin Gaethje	vs.	Ilia Topuria	Justin Gaethje	Ciryl Gane	$400,000 (FOTN) $425,000 (POTN)	
UFC Fight Night 278	Brendan Allen	vs.	Edmen Shahbazyan	Iwo Baraniewski	Édgar Cháirez	$100,000	
UFC Fight Night 277	Alonzo Menifield	vs.	Zhang Mingyang	Song Yadong	Kai Asakura	$100,000	
UFC Fight Night 276	Choi Doo-ho	vs.	Daniel Santos	Juan Díaz	Alice Ardelean	$100,000	
UFC 328	Joshua Van	vs.	Tatsuro Taira	Yaroslav Amosov	Jim Miller	$100,000	
UFC Fight Night 275	Shamil Gaziev	vs.	Brando Peričić	Carlos Prates	Quillan Salkilld	$100,000	
UFC Fight Night 274	Davey Grant	vs.	Adrián Luna Martinetti	Ryan Spann	Jackson McVey	$100,000	
UFC Fight Night 273	Charles Jourdain	vs.	Kyler Phillips	Mike Malott	Márcio Barbosa	$100,000	
UFC 327	Josh Hokit	vs.	Curtis Blaydes	Carlos Ulberg	Josh Hokit	$100,000	
UFC Fight Night 272	Tommy McMillen	vs.	Manolo Zecchini	Alessandro Costa	Alice Pereira	$100,000	
UFC Fight Night 271	Tofiq Musayev	vs.	Ignacio Bahamondes	Joe Pyfer	Alexa Grasso	$100,000	
UFC Fight Night 270	Mason Jones	vs.	Axel Sola	Iwo Baraniewski	Shanelle Dyer	$100,000	
UFC Fight Night 269	Marwan Rahiki	vs.	Harry Hardwick	Kevin Vallejos	Manoel Sousa	$100,000	
UFC 326	—N/a			Drew Dober	Gregory Rodrigues	$100,000	
UFC 326	—N/a			Alberto Montes	Rodolfo Bellato	$100,000	
UFC Fight Night 268	Regina Tarin	vs.	Ernesta Kareckaitė	Lone'er Kavanagh	Imanol Rodríguez	$100,000	
UFC Fight Night 267	—N/a			Sean Strickland	Uroš Medić	$100,000	
UFC Fight Night 267	—N/a			Melquizael Costa	Jacobe Smith	$100,000	
UFC Fight Night 266	Michał Oleksiejczuk	vs.	Marc-André Barriault	Mario Bautista	Jakub Wikłacz	$100,000	
UFC 325	Alexander Volkanovski	vs.	Diego Lopes	Maurício Ruffy	Quillan Salkilld	$100,000	
UFC 324	Justin Gaethje	vs.	Paddy Pimblett	Josh Hokit	Ty Miller	$100,000	
UFC on ESPN 73	Steven Asplund	vs.	Sean Sharaf	Manel Kape	Kevin Vallejos	$50,000	
UFC 323	Merab Dvalishvili	vs.	Petr Yan	Manuel Torres	Iwo Baraniewski	$50,000	
UFC Fight Night 265	—N/a			Arman Tsarukyan	Waldo Cortes-Acosta	$50,000	
UFC Fight Night 265	—N/a			Kyoji Horiguchi	Luke Riley	$50,000	
UFC 322	—N/a			Michael Morales	Carlos Prates	$50,000	
UFC 322	—N/a			Benoît Saint Denis	Bo Nickal	$50,000	
UFC Fight Night 264	—N/a			Gabriel Bonfim	Christian Leroy Duncan	$50,000	
UFC Fight Night 264	—N/a			Josh Hokit	Zachary Reese	$50,000	
UFC Fight Night 263	—N/a			Steve Garcia	Waldo Cortes-Acosta	$50,000	
UFC Fight Night 263	—N/a			Allan Nascimento	Donte Johnson	$50,000	
UFC 321	Ľudovít Klein	vs.	Mateusz Rębecki	Quillan Salkilld	Valter Walker	$50,000	
UFC Fight Night 262	Drew Dober	vs.	Kyle Prepolec	Charles Jourdain	Aori Qileng	$50,000	
UFC Fight Night 261	—N/a			Charles Oliveira	Vitor Petrino	$50,000	
UFC Fight Night 261	—N/a			Beatriz Mesquita	Julia Polastri	$50,000	
UFC 320	Jiří Procházka	vs.	Khalil Rountree Jr.	Alex Pereira	Jiří Procházka	$50,000	
UFC 320	Jiří Procházka	vs.	Khalil Rountree Jr.	Joe Pyfer	—N/a	$50,000	
UFC Fight Night 260	—N/a			Carlos Ulberg	Jimmy Crute	$50,000	
UFC Fight Night 260	—N/a			Tom Nolan	Brando Peričić	$50,000	
UFC Fight Night 259	Diego Lopes	vs.	Jean Silva	Diego Lopes	Santiago Luna	$50,000	
UFC Fight Night 258	—N/a			Benoît Saint Denis	Mason Jones	$50,000	
UFC Fight Night 258	—N/a			Ante Delija	Kauê Fernandes	$50,000	
UFC Fight Night 257	—N/a			Johnny Walker	Charles Johnson	$50,000	
UFC Fight Night 257	—N/a			Kyle Daukaus	Uran Satybaldiev	$50,000	
UFC 319	—N/a			Khamzat Chimaev	Lerone Murphy	$50,000	
UFC 319	—N/a			Carlos Prates	Tim Elliott	$50,000	
UFC on ESPN 72	—N/a			Anthony Hernandez	Christian Leroy Duncan	$50,000	
UFC on ESPN 72	—N/a			Elijah Smith	Joselyne Edwards	$50,000	
UFC on ESPN 71	Chris Duncan	vs.	Mateusz Rębecki	—N/a		$50,000	
UFC on ESPN 71	Esteban Ribovics	vs.	Elves Brener	—N/a		$50,000	
UFC on ABC 9	Sharabutdin Magomedov	vs.	Marc-André Barriault	Muslim Salikhov	Steven Nguyen	$50,000	
UFC 318	Brendan Allen	vs.	Marvin Vettori	Ateba Gautier	Islam Dulatov	$50,000	
UFC 318	Brendan Allen	vs.	Marvin Vettori	Carli Judice	—N/a	$50,000	
UFC on ESPN 70	Morgan Charrière	vs.	Nate Landwehr	Valter Walker	Fatima Kline	$50,000	
UFC 317	Joshua Van	vs.	Brandon Royval	Ilia Topuria	Gregory Rodrigues	$50,000	
UFC on ABC 8	Nazim Sadykhov	vs.	Nikolas Motta	Nazim Sadykhov	Nikolas Motta^{18}	$50,000	
UFC on ESPN 69	Kamaru Usman	vs.	Joaquin Buckley	Malcolm Wellmaker	Jose Ochoa	$50,000	
UFC 316	—N/a			Merab Dvalishvili	Kayla Harrison	$50,000	
UFC 316	—N/a			Kevin Holland	Yoo Joo-sang	$50,000	
UFC on ESPN 68	Alice Ardelean	vs.	Rayanne dos Santos	Ramiz Brahimaj	Jordan Leavitt	$50,000	
UFC Fight Night 256	Melquizael Costa	vs.	Julian Erosa	Michael Morales	Denise Gomes	$50,000	
UFC 315	Jack Della Maddalena	vs.	Belal Muhammad	Jasmine Jasudavicius	Marc-André Barriault	$50,000	
UFC on ESPN 67	—N/a			Cory Sandhagen	Reinier de Ridder	$50,000	
UFC on ESPN 67	—N/a			Azamat Bekoev	Quang Le	$50,000	
UFC on ESPN 66	Randy Brown	vs.	Nicolas Dalby	Zhang Mingyang	Malcolm Wellmaker	$50,000	
UFC 314	Alexander Volkanovski	vs.	Diego Lopes	Paddy Pimblett	Jean Silva	$50,000	
UFC on ESPN 65	—N/a			Lee Chang-ho	Ode' Osbourne	$50,000	
UFC on ESPN 65	—N/a			Dione Barbosa	Rhys McKee	$50,000	
UFC on ESPN 64	—N/a			Manuel Torres	Édgar Cháirez	$50,000	
UFC on ESPN 64	—N/a			David Martínez	Ateba Gautier	$50,000	
UFC Fight Night 255	—N/a			Sean Brady	Kevin Holland	$50,000	
UFC Fight Night 255	—N/a			Alexia Thainara	Shauna Bannon	$50,000	
UFC Fight Night 254	—N/a			Carlos Vera	André Lima	$50,000	
UFC Fight Night 254	—N/a			Priscila Cachoeira	Carli Judice	$50,000	
UFC 313	Justin Gaethje	vs.	Rafael Fiziev	Ignacio Bahamondes	Maurício Ruffy	$50,000	
UFC Fight Night 253	Nasrat Haqparast	vs.	Esteban Ribovics	Manel Kape	Mario Pinto	$50,000	
UFC Fight Night 252	Alonzo Menifield	vs.	Julius Walker	Jean Silva	Ricky Simón	$50,000	
UFC Fight Night 251	Jared Cannonier	vs.	Gregory Rodrigues	Edmen Shahbazyan	Gabriel Bonfim	$50,000	
UFC 312	Rong Zhu	vs.	Kody Steele	Tallison Teixeira	Quillan Salkilld	$50,000	
UFC Fight Night 250	Vinicius Oliveira	vs.	Said Nurmagomedov	Nassourdine Imavov	Bogdan Grad	$50,000	
UFC 311	Merab Dvalishvili	vs.	Umar Nurmagomedov	Jiří Procházka	Jailton Almeida	$50,000	
UFC Fight Night 249	Roman Kopylov	vs.	Chris Curtis	Mackenzie Dern	César Almeida	$50,000	
UFC on ESPN 63	Cub Swanson	vs.	Billy Quarantillo	Dustin Jacoby	Michael Johnson	$50,000	
UFC 310	—N/a			Alexandre Pantoja	Vicente Luque	$50,000	
UFC 310	—N/a			Chase Hooper	Kennedy Nzechukwu	$50,000	
UFC Fight Night 248	—N/a			Muslim Salikhov	Gabriella Fernandes	$50,000	
UFC Fight Night 248	—N/a			Zhang Mingyang	Shi Ming	$50,000	
UFC 309	Charles Oliveira	vs.	Michael Chandler	Jon Jones	Ramiz Brahimaj	$50,000	
UFC 309	Charles Oliveira	vs.	Michael Chandler	Oban Elliott	—N/a	$50,000	
UFC Fight Night 247	—N/a			Carlos Prates	Mansur Abdul-Malik	$50,000	
UFC Fight Night 247	—N/a			Charles Radtke	Da'Mon Blackshear	$50,000	
UFC Fight Night 246	—N/a			Jasmine Jasudavicius	Dustin Stoltzfus	$50,000	
UFC Fight Night 246	—N/a			Charles Jourdain	Youssef Zalal	$50,000	
UFC 308	Mateusz Rębecki	vs.	Myktybek Orolbai	Ilia Topuria	Khamzat Chimaev	$50,000	
UFC 308	Mateusz Rębecki	vs.	Myktybek Orolbai	Sharabutdin Magomedov	—N/a	$50,000	
UFC Fight Night 245	Darren Elkins	vs.	Daniel Pineda	Anthony Hernandez	—N/a	$50,000	
UFC Fight Night 244	Brandon Royval	vs.	Tatsuro Taira	Ramazan Temirov	Clayton Carpenter	$50,000	
UFC 307	Alex Pereira	vs.	Khalil Rountree Jr.	Joaquin Buckley	Ryan Spann	$50,000	
UFC Fight Night 243	—N/a			Bryan Battle	Morgan Charrière	$50,000	
UFC Fight Night 243	—N/a			Farès Ziam	Chris Duncan	$50,000	
UFC 306	Esteban Ribovics	vs.	Daniel Zellhuber	Ignacio Bahamondes	Ketlen Souza	$50,000	
UFC Fight Night 242	Natália Silva	vs.	Jéssica Andrade	Steve Garcia	Cody Durden	$50,000	
UFC on ESPN 62	Caio Borralho	vs.	Jared Cannonier	Michael Morales	Gerald Meerschaert	$50,000	
UFC 305	Dan Hooker	vs.	Mateusz Gamrot	Kai Kara-France	Carlos Prates	$50,000	
UFC on ESPN 61	—N/a			Serghei Spivac	Toshiomi Kazama	$50,000	
UFC on ESPN 61	—N/a			Youssef Zalal	—N/a	$50,000	
UFC on ABC 7	Sharabutdin Magomedov	vs.	Michał Oleksiejczuk	Joel Álvarez	Azamat Murzakanov	$50,000	
UFC 304	—N/a			Paddy Pimblett		$200,000	
UFC 304	—N/a			Tom Aspinall	Michael Parkin	$100,000	
UFC on ESPN 60	—N/a			Virna Jandiroba	Steve Garcia	$50,000	
UFC on ESPN 60	—N/a			Bruno Gustavo da Silva	Hyder Amil	$50,000	
UFC on ESPN 59	Jean Silva	vs.	Drew Dober	Charles Johnson	Montel Jackson	$50,000	
UFC 303	Cub Swanson	vs.	Andre Fili	Alex Pereira	Macy Chiasson	$50,000	
UFC 303	Cub Swanson	vs.	Andre Fili	Joe Pyfer	Payton Talbott	$50,000	
UFC on ABC 6	—N/a			Robert Whittaker	Volkan Oezdemir	$50,000	
UFC on ABC 6	—N/a			Sharabutdin Magomedov	Felipe Lima	$50,000	
UFC on ESPN 58	Gabriella Fernandes	vs.	Carli Judice	Tatsuro Taira	Brady Hiestand	$50,000	
UFC on ESPN 57	—N/a			Raul Rosas Jr.	Brunno Ferreira	$50,000	
UFC on ESPN 57	—N/a			Zachary Reese	Carlos Prates	$50,000	
UFC 302	Islam Makhachev	vs.	Dustin Poirier	Islam Makhachev	Kevin Holland	$50,000	
UFC Fight Night 241	Edson Barboza	vs.	Lerone Murphy	Khaos Williams	Angela Hill	$50,000	
UFC on ESPN 56	Trey Waters	vs.	Billy Goff	Carlos Ulberg	Carlos Diego Ferreira	$50,000	
UFC 301	—N/a			Michel Pereira	Caio Borralho	$50,000	
UFC 301	—N/a			Maurício Ruffy	Alessandro Costa	$50,000	
UFC on ESPN 55	—N/a			Alex Perez	Bogdan Guskov	$50,000	
UFC on ESPN 55	—N/a			Jhonata Diniz	Uroš Medić	$50,000	
UFC 300	Max Holloway	vs.	Justin Gaethje	Max Holloway	Jiří Procházka	$300,000	
UFC Fight Night 240	Jose Mariscal	vs.	Morgan Charrière	Ignacio Bahamondes	César Almeida	$50,000	
UFC on ESPN 54	Ibo Aslan	vs.	Anton Turkalj	Nate Landwehr	Dennis Buzukja	$50,000	
UFC on ESPN 53	Jarno Errens	vs.	Steven Nguyen	Payton Talbott	Fernando Padilla	$50,000^{17}	
UFC Fight Night 239	—N/a			Marcin Tybura	Macy Chiasson	$50,000	
UFC Fight Night 239	—N/a			Jafel Filho	Jaqueline Amorim	$50,000	
UFC 299	Dustin Poirier	vs.	Benoît Saint Denis	Sean O'Malley	Jack Della Maddalena	$50,000	
UFC 299	Dustin Poirier	vs.	Benoît Saint Denis	Curtis Blaydes	Michel Pereira	$50,000	
UFC 299	Dustin Poirier	vs.	Benoît Saint Denis	Robelis Despaigne	—N/a	$50,000	
UFC Fight Night 238	Vinicius Oliveira	vs.	Bernardo Sopaj	Steve Erceg	Vinicius Oliveira	$50,000	
UFC Fight Night 237	Daniel Zellhuber	vs.	Francisco Prado	Brian Ortega	Manuel Torres	$50,000	
UFC 298	Amanda Lemos	vs.	Mackenzie Dern	Ilia Topuria	Anthony Hernandez	$50,000	
UFC 298	Amanda Lemos	vs.	Mackenzie Dern	Zhang Mingyang	—N/a	$50,000	
UFC Fight Night 236	—N/a			Dan Ige	Rodolfo Vieira	$50,000	
UFC Fight Night 236	—N/a			Carlos Prates	Bogdan Guskov	$50,000	
UFC Fight Night 235	Charles Johnson	vs.	Azat Maksum	Randy Brown	Molly McCann	$50,000	
UFC 297	Sean Strickland	vs.	Dricus du Plessis	Gillian Robertson	Jasmine Jasudavicius	$50,000	
UFC Fight Night 234	—N/a			Magomed Ankalaev	Jim Miller	$50,000	
UFC Fight Night 234	—N/a			Brunno Ferreira	Marcus McGhee	$50,000	
UFC 296	Irene Aldana	vs.	Karol Rosa	Josh Emmett	Ariane Lipski	$50,000	
UFC 296	Irene Aldana	vs.	Karol Rosa	Shamil Gaziev	—N/a	$50,000	
UFC Fight Night 233	—N/a			Khalil Rountree Jr.	Nasrat Haqparast	$50,000	
UFC Fight Night 233	—N/a			Tim Elliott	Park Hyun-sung	$50,000	
UFC on ESPN 52	Rodolfo Bellato	vs.	Ihor Potieria	Arman Tsarukyan	Jalin Turner	$50,000	
UFC on ESPN 52	Rodolfo Bellato	vs.	Ihor Potieria	Sean Brady	Dustin Stoltzfus	$50,000	
UFC on ESPN 52	Rodolfo Bellato	vs.	Ihor Potieria	Miesha Tate	Cody Brundage	$50,000	
UFC on ESPN 52	Rodolfo Bellato	vs.	Ihor Potieria	Drakkar Klose	Jared Gooden	$50,000	
UFC Fight Night 232	—N/a			Brendan Allen	Amanda Ribas	$50,000	
UFC Fight Night 232	—N/a			Joanderson Brito	Jeka Saragih	$50,000	
UFC 295	Nazim Sadykhov	vs.	Viacheslav Borshchev	Alex Pereira	Tom Aspinall	$50,000	
UFC 295	Nazim Sadykhov	vs.	Viacheslav Borshchev	Jéssica Andrade	Benoît Saint-Denis	$50,000	
UFC 295	Nazim Sadykhov	vs.	Viacheslav Borshchev	Diego Lopes	—N/a	$50,000	
UFC Fight Night 231	Nicolas Dalby	vs.	Gabriel Bonfim	Elves Brener	Vitor Petrino	$50,000	
UFC 294	—N/a			Islam Makhachev	Ikram Aliskerov	$50,000	
UFC 294	—N/a			Said Nurmagomedov	Muhammad Mokaev	$50,000	
UFC Fight Night 230	Sodiq Yusuff	vs.	Edson Barboza	Jonathan Martinez	Michel Pereira	$50,000	
UFC Fight Night 229	—N/a			Bobby Green	Joe Pyfer	$50,000	
UFC Fight Night 229	—N/a			Drew Dober	Nate Maness	$50,000	
UFC Fight Night 228	Tim Means	vs.	André Fialho	Marina Rodriguez	Charles Jourdain	$50,000	
UFC Fight Night 227	—N/a			Raul Rosas Jr.	Daniel Zellhuber	$50,000	
UFC Fight Night 227	—N/a			Lupita Godinez	Roman Kopylov	$50,000	
UFC Fight Night 227	—N/a			Charlie Campbell	—N/a	$50,000	
UFC 293	Manel Kape	vs.	Felipe dos Santos	Sean Strickland	Justin Tafa	$50,000	
UFC Fight Night 226	Benoît Saint-Denis	vs.	Thiago Moisés	Ciryl Gane	Morgan Charrière	$50,000	
UFC Fight Night 225	Max Holloway	vs.	Jung Chan-sung	Junior Tafa	Michał Oleksiejczuk	$50,000	
UFC 292	Brad Katona	vs.	Cody Gibson	Sean O'Malley	Zhang Weili	$50,000	
UFC on ESPN 51	—N/a			Khalil Rountree Jr.	Iasmin Lucindo	$50,000	
UFC on ESPN 51	—N/a			Marcus McGhee	Da'Mon Blackshear	$50,000	
UFC on ESPN 50	—N/a			Tatiana Suarez	Dustin Jacoby	$50,000	
UFC on ESPN 50	—N/a			Diego Lopes	Carlston Harris	$50,000	
UFC on ESPN 50	—N/a			Asu Almabayev	—N/a	$50,000	
UFC 291	—N/a			Justin Gaethje	Derrick Lewis	$50,000	
UFC 291	—N/a			Bobby Green	Kevin Holland	$50,000	
UFC Fight Night 224	Jonny Parsons	vs.	Danny Roberts	Tom Aspinall	Paul Craig	$50,000	
UFC on ESPN 49	Jack Della Maddalena	vs.	Bassil Hafez	Mayra Bueno Silva	Francisco Prado	$50,000	
UFC 290	Brandon Moreno	vs.	Alexandre Pantoja	Denise Gomes	Dricus du Plessis	$50,000	
UFC on ESPN 48	Elves Brenner	vs.	Guram Kutateladze	Sean Strickland	Nursulton Ruziboev	$50,000	
UFC on ABC 5	Josh Emmett	vs.	Ilia Topuria	Maycee Barber	David Onama	$50,000	
UFC on ESPN 47	Jared Cannonier	vs.	Marvin Vettori	Manuel Torres	Alessandro Costa	$50,000	
UFC 289	Marc-André Barriault	vs.	Eryk Anders	Charles Oliveira	Mike Malott	$50,000	
UFC 289	Marc-André Barriault	vs.	Eryk Anders	Stephen Erceg	—N/a	$50,000	
UFC on ESPN 46	Alex Caceres	vs.	Daniel Pineda	Muhammad Naimov	Jim Miller	$50,000	
UFC Fight Night 223	Mackenzie Dern	vs.	Angela Hill	Carlos Diego Ferreira	Viacheslav Borschev	$50,000	
UFC on ABC 4	—N/a			Jailton Almeida	Ian Machado Garry	$50,000	
UFC on ABC 4	—N/a			Carlos Ulberg	Bryan Battle	$50,000	
UFC on ABC 4	—N/a			Matt Brown	—N/a	$50,000	
UFC 288	Movsar Evloev	vs.	Diego Lopes	Yan Xiaonan	Matt Frevola	$50,000	
UFC on ESPN 45	—N/a			Song Yadong	Caio Borralho	$50,000	
UFC on ESPN 45	—N/a			Rodolfo Vieira	Marcus McGhee	$50,000	
UFC Fight Night 222	—N/a			Sergei Pavlovich	Bruno Silva	$50,000	
UFC Fight Night 222	—N/a			Christos Giagos	Montel Jackson	$50,000	
UFC on ESPN 44	Bill Algeo	vs.	T.J. Brown	Edson Barboza	Brandon Royval	$50,000	
UFC on ESPN 44	Bill Algeo	vs.	T.J. Brown	Gillian Robertson	—N/a	$50,000	
UFC 287	Kelvin Gastelum	vs.	Chris Curtis	Israel Adesanya	Rob Font	$50,000	
UFC on ESPN 43	C.J. Vergara	vs.	Daniel da Silva	Nate Landwehr	Daniel Pineda	$50,000	
UFC 286	Justin Gaethje	vs.	Rafael Fiziev	Gunnar Nelson	Jake Hadley	$50,000	
UFC Fight Night 221	Vitor Petrino	vs.	Anton Turkalj	Davey Grant	Bruno Gustavo da Silva	$50,000	
UFC 285	Geoff Neal	vs.	Shavkat Rakhmonov	Jon Jones	Alexa Grasso	$50,000	
UFC 285	Geoff Neal	vs.	Shavkat Rakhmonov	Bo Nickal	—N/a	$50,000	
UFC Fight Night 220	—N/a			Brendan Allen	Tatiana Suarez	$50,000	
UFC Fight Night 220	—N/a			Mike Malott	Trevor Peek	$50,000	
UFC Fight Night 220	—N/a			Jordan Leavitt	Joe Solecki	$50,000	
UFC Fight Night 219	Nazim Sadykhov	vs.	Evan Elder	Erin Blanchfield	Mayra Bueno Silva	$50,000	
UFC 284	Islam Makhachev	vs.	Alexander Volkanovski	Yair Rodríguez	Jack Della Maddalena	$50,000	
UFC Fight Night 218	—N/a			Sergey Spivak	Anshul Jubli	$50,000	
UFC Fight Night 218	—N/a			Rinya Nakamura	Tatsuro Taira	$50,000	
UFC 283	Glover Teixeira	vs.	Jamahal Hill	Jailton Almeida	Ismael Bonfim	$50,000	
UFC Fight Night 217	—N/a			Dan Ige	Roman Kopylov	$50,000	
UFC Fight Night 217	—N/a			Umar Nurmagomedov	Allan Nascimento	$50,000	
UFC Fight Night 216	Drew Dober	vs.	Bobby Green	Alex Caceres	Michał Oleksiejczuk	$50,000	
UFC 282	Darren Till	vs.	Dricus du Plessis	Santiago Ponzinibbio	Ilia Topuria	$50,000	
UFC 282	Darren Till	vs.	Dricus du Plessis	Raul Rosas Jr.	Jairzinho Rozenstruik	$50,000	
UFC 282	Darren Till	vs.	Dricus du Plessis	Edmen Shahbazyan	Chris Curtis	$50,000	
UFC 282	Darren Till	vs.	Dricus du Plessis	Billy Quarantillo	T.J. Brown	$50,000	
UFC 282	Darren Till	vs.	Dricus du Plessis	Cameron Saaiman	—N/a	$50,000	
UFC on ESPN 42	Stephen Thompson	vs.	Kevin Holland	Sergei Pavlovich	Roman Dolidze	$50,000	
UFC Fight Night 215	—N/a			Kennedy Nzechukwu	Muslim Salikhov	$50,000	
UFC Fight Night 215	—N/a			Jack Della Maddalena	Natália Silva	$50,000	
UFC 281	Dustin Poirier	vs.	Michael Chandler	Alex Pereira	Zhang Weili	$50,000	
UFC Fight Night 214	—N/a			Neil Magny	Mario Bautista	$50,000	
UFC Fight Night 214	—N/a			Polyana Viana	Tamires Vidal	$50,000	
UFC Fight Night 213	—N/a			Tresean Gore	Roman Dolidze	$50,000	
UFC Fight Night 213	—N/a			Steve Garcia	Christian Rodriguez	$50,000	
UFC 280	Petr Yan	vs.	Sean O'Malley	Islam Makhachev	Belal Muhammad	$50,000	
UFC Fight Night 212	Duško Todorović	vs.	Jordan Wright	Jonathan Martinez	Tatsuro Taira	$50,000	
UFC Fight Night 211	John Castañeda	vs.	Daniel Santos	Joaquim Silva	Brendan Allen	$50,000	
UFC Fight Night 211	John Castañeda	vs.	Daniel Santos	Chelsea Chandler	Guido Cannetti	$50,000	
UFC Fight Night 210	Gregory Rodrigues	vs.	Chidi Njokuani	Damon Jackson	Joe Pyfer	$50,000	
UFC 279	—N/a			Nate Diaz	Irene Aldana	$50,000	
UFC 279	—N/a			Johnny Walker	Jailton Almeida	$50,000	
UFC Fight Night 209	Ciryl Gane	vs.	Tai Tuivasa	Abus Magomedov	Benoît Saint-Denis	$50,000	
UFC 278	Paulo Costa	vs.	Luke Rockhold	Leon Edwards	Victor Altamirano	$50,000	
UFC on ESPN 41	Nate Landwehr	vs.	David Onama	Marlon Vera	Tyson Nam	$50,000	
UFC on ESPN 40	Jamahal Hill	vs.	Thiago Santos	Geoff Neal	Mohammed Usman	$50,000	
UFC on ESPN 40	Jamahal Hill	vs.	Thiago Santos	Bryan Battle	—N/a	$50,000	
UFC 277	Brandon Moreno	vs.	Kai Kara-France	Alexandre Pantoja	Drew Dober	$50,000	
UFC Fight Night 208	—N/a			Molly McCann	Paddy Pimblett	$50,000	
UFC Fight Night 208	—N/a			Nikita Krylov	Jonathan Pearce	$50,000	
UFC on ABC 3	Matt Schnell	vs.	Su Mudaerji	Li Jingliang	Dustin Jacoby	$50,000	
UFC on ABC 3	Matt Schnell	vs.	Su Mudaerji	Ricky Simón	Amanda Lemos	$50,000	
UFC on ABC 3	Matt Schnell	vs.	Su Mudaerji	Bill Algeo	Punahele Soriano	$50,000	
UFC on ESPN 39	Michael Johnson	vs.	Jamie Mullarkey	Rafael Fiziev	Chase Sherman	$50,000	
UFC 276	Robbie Lawler	vs.	Bryan Barberena	Alex Pereira	Jalin Turner	$50,000	
UFC 276	Robbie Lawler	vs.	Bryan Barberena	Julija Stoliarenko	—N/a	$50,000	
UFC on ESPN 38	Mateusz Gamrot	vs.	Arman Tsarukyan	Shavkat Rakhmonov	Josh Parisian	$50,000	
UFC on ESPN 38	Mateusz Gamrot	vs.	Arman Tsarukyan	Thiago Moisés	—N/a	$50,000	
UFC on ESPN 37	Josh Emmett	vs.	Calvin Kattar	Kevin Holland	Joaquin Buckley	$50,000	
UFC on ESPN 37	Josh Emmett	vs.	Calvin Kattar	Gregory Rodrigues	Adrian Yanez	$50,000	
UFC on ESPN 37	Josh Emmett	vs.	Calvin Kattar	Jeremiah Wells	Ricardo Ramos	$50,000	
UFC on ESPN 37	Josh Emmett	vs.	Calvin Kattar	Cody Stamann	Phil Hawes	$50,000	
UFC on ESPN 37	Josh Emmett	vs.	Calvin Kattar	Roman Dolidze	—N/a	$50,000	
UFC 275	Glover Teixeira	vs.	Jiří Procházka	Zhang Weili	Jake Matthews	$50,000	
UFC 275	Glover Teixeira	vs.	Jiří Procházka	Jack Della Maddalena	Hayisaer Maheshate	$50,000	
UFC 275	Glover Teixeira	vs.	Jiří Procházka	Silvana Gómez Juárez	—N/a	$50,000	
UFC Fight Night 207	Lucas Almeida	vs.	Michael Trizano	Karine Silva	Ode' Osbourne	$50,000	
UFC Fight Night 206	Michel Pereira	vs.	Santiago Ponzinibbio	Chidi Njokuani	Chase Hooper	$50,000	
UFC on ESPN 36	Katlyn Chookagian	vs.	Amanda Ribas	Ryan Spann	Manuel Torres	$50,000	
UFC 274	Brandon Royval	vs.	Matt Schnell	Michael Chandler	André Fialho	$50,000	
UFC on ESPN 35	Marlon Vera	vs.	Rob Font^{16}	Joanderson Brito	Francisco Figueiredo	$50,000	
UFC Fight Night 205	Sergey Khandozhko	vs.	Dwight Grant	Jéssica Andrade	Claudio Puelles	$50,000	
UFC on ESPN 34	Mayra Bueno Silva	vs.	Wu Yanan	Drakkar Klose	André Fialho	$50,000	
UFC 273	Gilbert Burns	vs.	Khamzat Chimaev	Alexander Volkanovski	Alexey Oleynik	$50,000	
UFC on ESPN 33	Bryan Barberena	vs.	Matt Brown	Curtis Blaydes	Chris Gutiérrez	$50,000	
UFC Fight Night 204	—N/a			Tom Aspinall	Arnold Allen	$50,000	
UFC Fight Night 204	—N/a			Paddy Pimblett	Molly McCann	$50,000	
UFC Fight Night 204	—N/a			Ilia Topuria	Makwan Amirkhani	$50,000	
UFC Fight Night 204	—N/a			Sergei Pavlovich	Paul Craig	$50,000	
UFC Fight Night 204	—N/a			Muhammad Mokaev	—N/a	$50,000	
UFC Fight Night 203	—N/a			Song Yadong	Khalil Rountree Jr.	$50,000	
UFC Fight Night 203	—N/a			Cody Brundage	Azamat Murzakanov	$50,000	
UFC 272	Colby Covington	vs.	Jorge Masvidal	Kevin Holland	Maryna Moroz	$50,000	
UFC Fight Night 202	Priscila Cachoeira	vs.	Ji Yeon Kim	Wellington Turman	Arman Tsarukyan	$50,000	
UFC Fight Night 201	—N/a			Jamahal Hill	Kyle Daukaus	$50,000	
UFC Fight Night 201	—N/a			David Onama	Stephanie Egger	$50,000	
UFC 271	Douglas Silva de Andrade	vs.	Sergey Morozov	Tai Tuivasa	Jared Cannonier	$50,000	
UFC Fight Night 200	Julian Erosa	vs.	Steven Peterson^{15}	Shavkat Rakhmonov	Chidi Njokuani	$50,000	
UFC 270	Deiveson Figueiredo	vs.	Brandon Moreno	Said Nurmagomedov	Vanessa Demopoulos	$50,000	
UFC on ESPN 32	Calvin Kattar	vs.	Giga Chikadze	Jake Collier	Viacheslav Borshchev	$50,000	
UFC Fight Night 199	Amanda Lemos	vs.	Angela Hill	Cub Swanson	Melissa Gatto	$50,000	
UFC 269	Dominick Cruz	vs.	Pedro Munhoz	Charles Oliveira	Julianna Peña	$50,000	
UFC 269	Dominick Cruz	vs.	Pedro Munhoz	Kai Kara-France	Sean O'Malley	$50,000	
UFC 269	Dominick Cruz	vs.	Pedro Munhoz	Tai Tuivasa	Bruno Silva	$50,000	
UFC on ESPN 31	Cheyanne Vlismas	vs.	Mallory Martin	Rafael Fiziev	Jamahal Hill	$50,000	
UFC on ESPN 31	Cheyanne Vlismas	vs.	Mallory Martin	Clay Guida	Chris Curtis	$50,000	
UFC Fight Night 198	Adrian Yanez	vs.	Davey Grant	Taila Santos	—N/a	$50,000	
UFC Fight Night 197	Max Holloway	vs.	Yair Rodríguez	Khaos Williams	Andrea Lee	$50,000	
UFC 268	Justin Gaethje	vs.	Michael Chandler	Marlon Vera	Alex Pereira	$50,000	
UFC 268	Justin Gaethje	vs.	Michael Chandler	Bobby Green	Chris Barnett	$50,000	
UFC 267	Petr Yan	vs.	Cory Sandhagen	Glover Teixeira	Khamzat Chimaev	$50,000	
UFC Fight Night 196	Gregory Rodrigues	vs.	Park Jun-yong	Marvin Vettori	Alex Caceres	$50,000	
UFC Fight Night 195	—N/a			Jim Miller	Nate Landwehr	$50,000	
UFC Fight Night 195	—N/a			Bruno Silva	Danaa Batgerel	$50,000	
UFC Fight Night 194	Marina Rodriguez	vs.	Mackenzie Dern	Mariya Agapova	Lupita Godinez	$50,000	
UFC Fight Night 193	—N/a			Casey O'Neill	Jamie Mullarkey	$50,000	
UFC Fight Night 193	—N/a			Douglas Silva de Andrade	Alejandro Pérez	$50,000	
UFC 266	Alexander Volkanovski	vs.	Brian Ortega	Chris Daukaus	Merab Dvalishvili	$50,000	
UFC Fight Night 192	—N/a			Anthony Smith	Arman Tsarukyan	$50,000	
UFC Fight Night 192	—N/a			Nate Maness	Joaquin Buckley	$50,000	
UFC Fight Night 191	Molly McCann	vs.	Ji Yeon Kim	Paddy Pimblett	Tom Aspinall	$50,000	
UFC on ESPN 30	—N/a			Giga Chikadze	Gerald Meerschaert	$50,000	
UFC on ESPN 30	—N/a			Abdul Razak Alhassan	Pat Sabatini	$50,000	
UFC on ESPN 29	—N/a			William Knight	Alexandre Pantoja	$50,000	
UFC on ESPN 29	—N/a			Ignacio Bahamondes	Josiane Nunes	$50,000	
UFC 265	Rafael Fiziev	vs.	Bobby Green	Ciryl Gane	Vicente Luque	$50,000	
UFC 265	Rafael Fiziev	vs.	Bobby Green	Jessica Penne	Miles Johns	$50,000	
UFC on ESPN 28	Jason Witt	vs.	Bryan Barberena	Cheyanne Vlismas	Melsik Baghdasaryan	$50,000	
UFC on ESPN 27	Raulian Paiva	vs.	Kyler Phillips	Adrian Yanez	Darren Elkins	$50,000	
UFC on ESPN 26	Billy Quarantillo	vs.	Gabriel Benítez	Rodrigo Nascimento	Rodolfo Vieira	$50,000	
UFC on ESPN 26	Billy Quarantillo	vs.	Gabriel Benítez	Mateusz Gamrot	Miesha Tate	$50,000	
UFC 264	Sean O'Malley	vs.	Kris Moutinho	Tai Tuivasa	Dricus du Plessis	$75,000	
UFC Fight Night 190	Timur Valiev	vs.	Raoni Barcelos	Marcin Prachnio	Kennedy Nzechukwu	$50,000	
UFC on ESPN 25	Marlon Vera	vs.	Davey Grant	Matt Brown	Seung Woo Choi	$50,000	
UFC 263	Brad Riddell	vs.	Drew Dober	Brandon Moreno	Paul Craig	$50,000	
UFC Fight Night 189	Santiago Ponzinibbio	vs.	Miguel Baeza	Jairzinho Rozenstruik	Marcin Tybura	$50,000	
UFC Fight Night 188	Justin Tafa	vs.	Jared Vanderaa	Carla Esparza	Bruno Gustavo da Silva	$50,000	
UFC 262	Edson Barboza	vs.	Shane Burgos	Charles Oliveira	Christos Giagos	$75,000	
UFC on ESPN 24	Gregor Gillespie	vs.	Carlos Diego Ferreira^{14}	Alex Morono	Carlston Harris	$50,000	
UFC on ESPN 23	Jiří Procházka	vs.	Dominick Reyes	Jiří Procházka	Giga Chikadze	$50,000	
UFC 261	Jeff Molina	vs.	Aori Qileng	Kamaru Usman	Rose Namajunas	$50,000	
UFC on ESPN 22	Robert Whittaker	vs.	Kelvin Gastelum	Gerald Meerschaert	Tony Gravely	$50,000	
UFC on ABC 2	Julian Marquez	vs.	Sam Alvey	Mackenzie Dern	Mateusz Gamrot	$50,000	
UFC 260	Vicente Luque	vs.	Tyron Woodley	Francis Ngannou	Sean O'Malley	$50,000	
UFC on ESPN 21	—N/a			Max Griffin	Grant Dawson	$50,000	
UFC on ESPN 21	—N/a			Bruno Gustavo da Silva	Adrian Yanez	$50,000	
UFC Fight Night 187	—N/a			Dan Ige	Ryan Spann	$50,000	
UFC Fight Night 187	—N/a			Davey Grant	Matthew Semelsberger	$50,000	
UFC 259	Kennedy Nzechukwu	vs.	Carlos Ulberg	Kai Kara-France	Uroš Medić	$50,000	
UFC Fight Night 186	Pedro Munhoz	vs.	Jimmie Rivera	Ronnie Lawrence	—N/a	$50,000	
UFC Fight Night 185	—N/a			Derrick Lewis	Chris Daukaus	$50,000	
UFC Fight Night 185	—N/a			Tom Aspinall	Aiemann Zahabi	$50,000	
UFC 258	—N/a			Anthony Hernandez	Julian Marquez	$50,000	
UFC 258	—N/a			Kamaru Usman	Polyana Viana	$50,000	
UFC Fight Night 184	Beneil Dariush	vs.	Carlos Diego Ferreira	Alexander Volkov	Cory Sandhagen	$50,000	
UFC 257	—N/a			Dustin Poirier	Michael Chandler	$50,000	
UFC 257	—N/a			Makhmud Muradov	Marina Rodriguez	$50,000	
UFC on ESPN 20	Mike Davis	vs.	Mason Jones	Umar Nurmagomedov	Warlley Alves	$50,000	
UFC on ABC 1	Max Holloway	vs.	Calvin Kattar	Alessio Di Chirico	Li Jingliang	$50,000	
UFC Fight Night 183	—N/a			Stephen Thompson	Rob Font	$50,000	
UFC Fight Night 183	—N/a			Marcin Tybura	Jimmy Flick	$50,000	
UFC 256	Deiveson Figueiredo	vs.	Brandon Moreno	Kevin Holland	Rafael Fiziev	$50,000	
UFC on ESPN 19	Marvin Vettori	vs.	Jack Hermansson	Jordan Leavitt	Gabriel Benítez	$50,000	
UFC on ESPN 18	—N/a			Anthony Smith	Miguel Baeza	$50,000	
UFC on ESPN 18	—N/a			Su Mudaerji	Nate Maness	$50,000	
UFC 255	Louis Cosce	vs.	Sasha Palatnikov	Joaquin Buckley	Antonina Shevchenko	$50,000	
UFC Fight Night 182	Paul Felder	vs.	Rafael dos Anjos	Sean Strickland	Khaos Williams	$50,000	
UFC on ESPN 17	Raoni Barcelos	vs.	Khalid Taha	Giga Chikadze	Alexander Romanov	$50,000	
UFC Fight Night 181	—N/a			Kevin Holland	Alexander Hernandez	$50,000	
UFC Fight Night 181	—N/a			Adrian Yanez	Miles Johns	$50,000	
UFC 254	Casey Kenney	vs.	Nathaniel Wood	Khabib Nurmagomedov	Magomed Ankalaev	$50,000	
UFC Fight Night 180	Guram Kutateladze	vs.	Mateusz Gamrot	Jéssica Andrade	Jimmy Crute	$50,000	
UFC Fight Night 179	—N/a			Cory Sandhagen	Joaquin Buckley	$50,000	
UFC Fight Night 179	—N/a			Chris Daukaus	Tom Breese	$50,000	
UFC on ESPN 16	—N/a			Germaine de Randamie	Duško Todorović	$50,000	
UFC on ESPN 16	—N/a			Kyler Phillips	Luigi Vendramini	$50,000	
UFC 253	Brandon Royval	vs.	Kai Kara-France	Israel Adesanya	Jan Błachowicz	$50,000	
UFC Fight Night 178	—N/a			Khamzat Chimaev	Mackenzie Dern	$50,000	
UFC Fight Night 178	—N/a			Randy Costa	Damon Jackson	$50,000	
UFC Fight Night 177	Michelle Waterson	vs.	Angela Hill	Ottman Azaitar	Kevin Croom	$50,000	
UFC Fight Night 176	—N/a			Ovince Saint Preux	Michel Pereira	$50,000	
UFC Fight Night 176	—N/a			André Muniz	Brian Kelleher	$50,000	
UFC Fight Night 175	Ricardo Lamas	vs.	Bill Algeo	Mallory Martin	Sean Brady	$50,000	
UFC on ESPN 15	Frankie Edgar	vs.	Pedro Munhoz	Shana Dobson	Trevin Jones	$50,000	
UFC 252	Kai Kamaka III	vs.	Tony Kelley	Daniel Pineda	Virna Jandiroba	$50,000	
UFC Fight Night 174	—N/a			Andrew Sanchez	Gavin Tucker	$50,000	
UFC Fight Night 174	—N/a			Kevin Holland	Darren Stewart	$50,000	
UFC Fight Night 173	Bobby Green	vs.	Lando Vannata	Jennifer Maia	Vicente Luque	$50,000	
UFC on ESPN 14	—N/a			Paul Craig	Fabrício Werdum	$50,000	
UFC on ESPN 14	—N/a			Tanner Boser	Jesse Ronson	$50,000	
UFC on ESPN 14	—N/a			Tom Aspinall	Khamzat Chimaev	$50,000	
UFC Fight Night 172	Rafael Fiziev	vs.	Marc Diakiese	Ariane Lipski	Deiveson Figueiredo	$50,000	
UFC on ESPN 13	Mounir Lazzez	vs.	Abdul Razak Alhassan^{13}	Khamzat Chimaev	Lerone Murphy	$50,000	
UFC on ESPN 13	Mounir Lazzez	vs.	Abdul Razak Alhassan^{13}	Modestas Bukauskas	—N/a	$50,000	
UFC 251	Rose Namajunas	vs.	Jéssica Andrade	Jiří Procházka	Davey Grant	$50,000	
UFC on ESPN 12	Dustin Poirier	vs.	Dan Hooker	Kay Hansen	Julian Erosa	$50,000	
UFC on ESPN 11	Josh Emmett	vs.	Shane Burgos	Jim Miller	Justin Jaynes	$50,000	
UFC on ESPN 10	—N/a			Marvin Vettori	Mariya Agapova	$50,000	
UFC on ESPN 10	—N/a			Tyson Nam	Christian Aguilera	$50,000	
UFC 250	—N/a			Sean O'Malley	Alex Perez	$50,000	
UFC 250	—N/a			Cody Garbrandt	Aljamain Sterling	$50,000	
UFC on ESPN 9	Brandon Royval	vs.	Tim Elliott	Gilbert Burns	Mackenzie Dern	$50,000	
UFC on ESPN 8	Song Yadong	vs.	Marlon Vera	Cortney Casey	Miguel Baeza	$50,000	
UFC Fight Night 171	Brian Kelleher	vs.	Hunter Azure	Glover Teixeira	Drew Dober	$50,000	
UFC 249	Tony Ferguson	vs.	Justin Gaethje	Justin Gaethje	Francis Ngannou	$50,000	
UFC Fight Night 170	Maryna Moroz	vs.	Mayra Bueno Silva	Charles Oliveira	Gilbert Burns	$50,000	
UFC 248	Zhang Weili	vs.	Joanna Jędrzejczyk	Beneil Dariush	Sean O'Malley	$50,000	
UFC Fight Night 169	Kyler Phillips	vs.	Gabriel Silva	Megan Anderson	Jordan Griffin	$50,000	
UFC Fight Night 168	Dan Hooker	vs.	Paul Felder	Jimmy Crute	Priscila Cachoeira	$50,000	
UFC Fight Night 167	Scott Holtzman	vs.	Jim Miller	Jan Błachowicz	Daniel Rodriguez	$50,000	
UFC 247	Trevin Giles	vs.	James Krause	Khaos Williams	Mario Bautista	$50,000	
UFC Fight Night 166	Brett Johns	vs.	Tony Gravely	Alex Perez	Herbert Burns	$50,000	
UFC 246	—N/a			Conor McGregor	Alexey Oleynik	$50,000	
UFC 246	—N/a			Brian Kelleher	Drew Dober	$50,000	
UFC 246	—N/a			Carlos Diego Ferreira	—N/a	$50,000	
UFC Fight Night 165	Charles Jourdain	vs.	Choi Doo-ho	Chan Sung Jung	Alexandre Pantoja	$50,000	
UFC 245	Kamaru Usman	vs.	Colby Covington	Irene Aldana	Petr Yan	$50,000	
UFC on ESPN 7	Rob Font	vs.	Ricky Simón	Bryce Mitchell	Makhmud Muradov	$50,000	
UFC Fight Night 164	—N/a			Charles Oliveira	James Krause	$50,000	
UFC Fight Night 164	—N/a			Ricardo Ramos	Randy Brown	$50,000	
UFC Fight Night 163	Zabit Magomedsharipov	vs.	Calvin Kattar	Magomed Ankalaev	David Zawada	$50,000	
UFC 244	Stephen Thompson	vs.	Vicente Luque	Kevin Lee	Corey Anderson	$50,000	
UFC Fight Night 162	Demian Maia	vs.	Ben Askren	Beneil Dariush	Ciryl Gane	$50,000	
UFC on ESPN 6	Yair Rodríguez	vs.	Jeremy Stephens	Dominick Reyes	Charles Rosa	$50,000	
UFC Fight Night 161	Cub Swanson	vs.	Kron Gracie	Niko Price	Marlon Vera	$50,000	
UFC 243	Brad Riddell	vs.	Jamie Mullarkey	Israel Adesanya	Yorgan De Castro	$50,000	
UFC Fight Night 160	—N/a			Jared Cannonier	Ovince Saint Preux	$50,000	
UFC Fight Night 160	—N/a			John Phillips	Jack Shore	$50,000	
UFC Fight Night 159	Carla Esparza	vs.	Alexa Grasso	Steven Peterson	Paul Craig	$50,000	
UFC Fight Night 158	Tristan Connelly	vs.	Michel Pereira^{12}	Justin Gaethje	Misha Cirkunov	$50,000	
UFC 242	—N/a			Khabib Nurmagomedov	Ottman Azaitar	$50,000	
UFC 242	—N/a			Belal Muhammad	Muslim Salikhov	$50,000	
UFC Fight Night 157	Alateng Heili	vs.	Danaa Batgerel	Zhang Weili	Li Jingliang	$50,000	
UFC 241	Paulo Costa	vs.	Yoel Romero	Stipe Miocic	Khama Worthy	$50,000	
UFC Fight Night 156	Vicente Luque	vs.	Mike Perry	Volkan Oezdemir	Veronica Macedo	$50,000	
UFC on ESPN 5	Antonina Shevchenko	vs.	Lucie Pudilová	Nasrat Haqparast	Matt Schnell	$50,000	
UFC 240	Deiveson Figueiredo	vs.	Alexandre Pantoja	Geoff Neal	Hakeem Dawodu	$50,000	
UFC on ESPN 4	Mario Bautista	vs.	Jin Soon Son	Dan Hooker	Walt Harris	$50,000	
UFC Fight Night 155	—N/a			Urijah Faber	Josh Emmett	$50,000	
UFC Fight Night 155	—N/a			Andre Fili	Jonathan Martinez	$50,000	
UFC 239	—N/a			Song Yadong	Amanda Nunes	$50,000	
UFC 239	—N/a			Jorge Masvidal	Jan Błachowicz	$50,000	
UFC on ESPN 3	—N/a			Francis Ngannou	Joseph Benavidez	$50,000	
UFC on ESPN 3	—N/a			Alonzo Menifield	Eryk Anders	$50,000	
UFC Fight Night 154	Deron Winn	vs.	Eric Spicely	Chan Sung Jung	Jairzinho Rozenstruik	$50,000	
UFC 238	Tony Ferguson	vs.	Donald Cerrone	Henry Cejudo	Valentina Shevchenko	$50,000	
UFC Fight Night 153	—N/a			Anthony Smith	Aleksandar Rakić	$50,000	
UFC Fight Night 153	—N/a			Makwan Amirkhani	Leonardo Santos	$50,000	
UFC Fight Night 152	Aspen Ladd	vs.	Sijara Eubanks	Michel Pereira	Grant Dawson	$50,000	
UFC 237	Jéssica Andrade	vs.	Rose Namajunas	Jéssica Andrade	Warlley Alves	$50,000	
UFC Fight Night 151	Donald Cerrone	vs.	Al Iaquinta	Walt Harris	Macy Chiasson	$50,000	
UFC Fight Night 150	Mike Perry	vs.	Alex Oliveira	Glover Teixeira	Jim Miller	$50,000	
UFC Fight Night 149	Islam Makhachev	vs.	Arman Tsarukyan	Magomed Mustafaev	Sergei Pavlovich	$50,000	
UFC 236	Israel Adesanya	vs.	Kelvin Gastelum	—N/a	—N/a	$50,000	
UFC 236	Dustin Poirier	vs.	Max Holloway	—N/a	—N/a	$50,000	
UFC on ESPN 2	Justin Gaethje	vs.	Edson Barboza	Paul Craig	Jack Hermansson	$50,000	
UFC Fight Night 148	Bryce Mitchell	vs.	Bobby Moffett	Anthony Pettis	Randa Markos	$50,000	
UFC Fight Night 147	Jorge Masvidal	vs.	Darren Till	Jorge Masvidal	Dan Ige	$50,000	
UFC Fight Night 146	Junior dos Santos	vs.	Derrick Lewis	Niko Price	Beneil Dariush	$50,000	
UFC 235	Pedro Munhoz	vs.	Cody Garbrandt	Johnny Walker	Diego Sanchez	$50,000	
UFC Fight Night 145	—N/a			Thiago Santos	Stefan Struve	$50,000	
UFC Fight Night 145	—N/a			Michał Oleksiejczuk	Dwight Grant	$50,000	
UFC on ESPN 1	Vicente Luque	vs.	Bryan Barberena	Kron Gracie	Luke Sanders	$50,000	
UFC 234	Israel Adesanya	vs.	Anderson Silva	Montana De La Rosa	Devonte Smith	$50,000	
UFC Fight Night 144	—N/a			Marlon Moraes	José Aldo	$50,000	
UFC Fight Night 144	—N/a			Charles Oliveira	Johnny Walker	$50,000	
UFC Fight Night 143	Donald Cerrone	vs.	Alexander Hernandez	Donald Cerrone	Henry Cejudo	$50,000	
UFC 232	Alexander Volkanovski	vs.	Chad Mendes	Amanda Nunes	Ryan Hall	$50,000	
UFC on Fox 31	Joaquim Silva	vs.	Jared Gordon	Al Iaquinta	Charles Oliveira	$50,000	
UFC 231	Max Holloway	vs.	Brian Ortega	Max Holloway	Thiago Santos	$50,000	
UFC Fight Night 142	Kai Kara-France	vs.	Elias Garcia	Maurício Rua	Sodiq Yusuff	$50,000	
TUF 28 Finale	—N/a			Kamaru Usman	Joseph Benavidez	$50,000	
TUF 28 Finale	—N/a			Juan Espino	Roosevelt Roberts	$50,000	
UFC Fight Night 141	Alex Morono	vs.	Song Kenan	Francis Ngannou	Li Jingliang	$50,000	
UFC Fight Night 140	Laureano Staropoli	vs.	Hector Aldana	Santiago Ponzinibbio	Johnny Walker	$50,000	
UFC Fight Night 139	Chan Sung Jung	vs.	Yair Rodríguez	Donald Cerrone	Yair Rodríguez	$50,000	
UFC 230	Ronaldo Souza	vs.	Chris Weidman	Jared Cannonier	Israel Adesanya	$50,000	
UFC Fight Night 138	Nasrat Haqparast	vs.	Thibault Gouti	Anthony Smith	Don Madge	$50,000	
UFC 229	Tony Ferguson	vs.	Anthony Pettis	Derrick Lewis	Aspen Ladd	$50,000	
UFC Fight Night 137	Thiago Santos	vs.	Eryk Anders	Antônio Rogério Nogueira	Charles Oliveira	$50,000	
UFC Fight Night 136	Petr Yan	vs.	Jin Soo Son^{11}	Alexey Oleynik	Jan Błachowicz	$50,000	
UFC Fight Night 136	Petr Yan	vs.	Jin Soo Son^{11}	Magomed Ankalaev	—N/a	$50,000	
UFC 228	Irene Aldana	vs.	Lucie Pudilová	Tyron Woodley	Jéssica Andrade	$50,000	
UFC Fight Night 135	Cory Sandhagen	vs.	Iuri Alcântara	Justin Gaethje	Eryk Anders	$50,000	
UFC 227	Henry Cejudo	vs.	Demetrious Johnson	T.J. Dillashaw	Renato Moicano	$50,000	
UFC on Fox 30	John Makdessi	vs.	Ross Pearson	Dustin Poirier	José Aldo	$50,000	
UFC Fight Night 134	Danny Roberts	vs.	David Zawada	Anthony Smith	Manny Bermudez	$50,000	
UFC Fight Night 133	Raoni Barcelos	vs.	Kurt Holobaugh	Niko Price	Chad Mendes	$50,000	
UFC 226	—N/a			Paulo Costa	Khalil Rountree Jr.	$50,000	
UFC 226	—N/a			Anthony Pettis	Daniel Cormier	$50,000	
TUF 27 Finale	Alex Caceres	vs.	Martin Bravo	Israel Adesanya	Luis Pena	$50,000	
UFC Fight Night 132	Shane Young	vs.	Rolando Dy	Ovince Saint Preux	Song Yadong	$50,000	
UFC 225	Robert Whittaker	vs.	Yoel Romero^{10}	Curtis Blaydes	Charles Oliveira	$50,000	
UFC Fight Night 131	—N/a			Marlon Moraes	Gregor Gillespie	$50,000	
UFC Fight Night 131	—N/a			Ben Saunders	Nathaniel Wood	$50,000	
UFC Fight Night 130	—N/a			Tom Breese	Darren Stewart	$50,000	
UFC Fight Night 130	—N/a			Cláudio Silva	Arnold Allen	$50,000	
UFC Fight Night 129	Andrea Lee	vs.	Veronica Macedo	Claudio Puelles	Gabriel Benítez	$50,000	
UFC 224	Kelvin Gastelum	vs.	Ronaldo Souza	Lyoto Machida	Alexey Oleynik	$50,000	
UFC Fight Night 128	Ricky Simón	vs.	Merab Dvalishvili	Siyar Bahadurzada	David Branch	$50,000	
UFC on Fox 29	Dustin Poirier	vs.	Justin Gaethje	Alex Oliveira	Adam Wieczorek	$50,000	
UFC 223	Zabit Magomedsharipov	vs.	Kyle Bochniak	Olivier Aubin-Mercier	Chris Gruetzemacher	$50,000	
UFC Fight Night 127	Jan Błachowicz	vs.	Jimi Manuwa	Alexander Volkov	Paul Craig	$50,000	
UFC 222	Sean O'Malley	vs.	Andre Soukhamthath	Brian Ortega	Alexander Hernandez	$50,000	
UFC on Fox 28	Alan Jouban	vs.	Ben Saunders	Jeremy Stephens	Ilir Latifi	$50,000	
UFC Fight Night 126	Brandon Davis	vs.	Steven Peterson	Derrick Lewis	Curtis Millender	$50,000	
UFC 221	Jake Matthews	vs.	Li Jingliang	Israel Adesanya	Jussier Formiga	$50,000	
UFC Fight Night 125	Thiago Santos	vs.	Anthony Smith	Valentina Shevchenko	Iuri Alcântara	$50,000	
UFC on Fox 27	Drew Dober	vs.	Frank Camacho	Ronaldo Souza	Mirsad Bektić	$50,000	
UFC 220	Calvin Kattar	vs.	Shane Burgos	Daniel Cormier	Abdul Razak Alhassan	$50,000	
UFC Fight Night 124	Jeremy Stephens	vs.	Choi Doo-ho	Darren Elkins	Polo Reyes	$50,000	
UFC 219	Cris Cyborg	vs.	Holly Holm	Khabib Nurmagomedov	Tim Elliott	$50,000	
UFC on Fox 26	Julian Marquez	vs.	Darren Stewart	Nordine Taleb	Alessio Di Chirico	$50,000	
UFC Fight Night 123	Brian Ortega	vs.	Cub Swanson	Brian Ortega	Marlon Moraes	$50,000	
UFC 218	Eddie Alvarez	vs.	Justin Gaethje	—N/a	—N/a	$50,000	
UFC 218	Yancy Medeiros	vs.	Alex Oliveira	—N/a	—N/a	$50,000	
TUF 26 Finale	Nicco Montaño	vs.	Roxanne Modafferi	Brett Johns	Gerald Meerschaert	$50,000	
UFC Fight Night 122	—N/a			Kelvin Gastelum	Li Jingliang	$50,000	
UFC Fight Night 122	—N/a			Zabit Magomedsharipov	Song Yadong	$50,000	
UFC Fight Night 121	Frank Camacho^{9}	vs.	Damien Brown	Nik Lentz	Tai Tuivasa	$50,000	
UFC Fight Night 120	Dustin Poirier	vs.	Anthony Pettis	Matt Brown	Raphael Assunção	$50,000	
UFC 217	—N/a			Georges St-Pierre	T.J. Dillashaw	$50,000	
UFC 217	—N/a			Rose Namajunas	—N/a	$50,000	
UFC 217	—N/a			Ovince Saint Preux	Ricardo Ramos	$25,000	
UFC Fight Night 119	Elizeu Zaleski dos Santos	vs.	Max Griffin	Derek Brunson	Pedro Munhoz	$50,000	
UFC Fight Night 118	Brian Kelleher	vs.	Damian Stasiak	Darren Till	Jan Błachowicz	$50,000	
UFC 216	Lando Vannata	vs.	Bobby Green	Demetrious Johnson	John Moraga	$50,000	
UFC Fight Night 117	Jéssica Andrade	vs.	Cláudia Gadelha	Ovince Saint Preux	Gökhan Saki	$50,000	
UFC Fight Night 116	Gregor Gillespie	vs.	Jason Gonzalez	Uriah Hall	Mike Perry	$50,000	
UFC 215	Jeremy Stephens	vs.	Gilbert Melendez	Rafael dos Anjos	Henry Cejudo	$50,000	
UFC Fight Night 115	Alexander Volkov	vs.	Stefan Struve	Mairbek Taisumov	Zabit Magomedsharipov	$50,000	
UFC Fight Night 114	—N/a			Niko Price	Humberto Bandenay	$50,000	
UFC Fight Night 114	—N/a			Dustin Ortiz	Joseph Morales	$50,000	
UFC 214	Brian Ortega	vs.	Renato Moicano	Jon Jones	Volkan Oezdemir	$50,000	
UFC on Fox 25	Elizeu Zaleski dos Santos	vs.	Lyman Good	Alex Oliveira	Júnior Albini	$50,000	
UFC Fight Night 113	Danny Henry	vs.	Daniel Teymur	Santiago Ponzinibbio	Paul Felder	$50,000	
UFC 213	Yoel Romero	vs.	Robert Whittaker	Chad Laprise	Rob Font	$50,000	
TUF 25 Finale	Michael Johnson	vs.	Justin Gaethje	Justin Gaethje	Tecia Torres	$50,000	
UFC Fight Night 112	—N/a			Jeremy Kimball	Dominick Reyes	$50,000	
UFC Fight Night 112	—N/a			Tim Boetsch	Kevin Lee	$50,000	
UFC Fight Night 111	Li Jingliang	vs.	Frank Camacho	Holly Holm	Ulka Sasaki	$50,000	
UFC Fight Night 110	Mark Hunt	vs.	Derrick Lewis	Dan Hooker	Ben Nguyen	$50,000	
UFC 212	Max Holloway	vs.	José Aldo	Brian Kelleher	Cláudia Gadelha	$50,000	
UFC Fight Night 109	Alexander Gustafsson	vs.	Glover Teixeira	Bojan Veličković	Damir Hadžović	$50,000	
UFC 211	Chase Sherman	vs.	Rashad Coulter	Stipe Miocic	Jason Knight	$50,000	
UFC Fight Night 108	Cub Swanson	vs.	Artem Lobov	Brandon Moreno	Mike Perry	$50,000	
UFC on Fox 24	Tim Elliott	vs.	Louis Smolka	Demetrious Johnson	Robert Whittaker	$50,000	
UFC 210	Shane Burgos	vs.	Charles Rosa	Charles Oliveira	Gregor Gillespie	$50,000	
UFC Fight Night 107	—N/a			Jimi Manuwa	Gunnar Nelson	$50,000	
UFC Fight Night 107	—N/a			Marlon Vera	Marc Diakiese	$50,000	
UFC Fight Night 106	—N/a			Kelvin Gastelum	Edson Barboza	$50,000	
UFC Fight Night 106	—N/a			Michel Prazeres	Paulo Costa	$50,000	
UFC 209	David Teymur	vs.	Lando Vannata	Darren Elkins	Iuri Alcântara	$50,000	
UFC Fight Night 105	Derrick Lewis	vs.	Travis Browne	Paul Felder	Thiago Santos	$50,000	
UFC 208	Dustin Poirier	vs.	Jim Miller	Ronaldo Souza	—N/a	$50,000	
UFC Fight Night 104	Jéssica Andrade	vs.	Angela Hill	Chan Sung Jung	Marcel Fortuna	$50,000	
UFC on Fox 23	—N/a			Valentina Shevchenko	Jorge Masvidal	$50,000	
UFC on Fox 23	—N/a			Francis Ngannou	Jason Knight	$50,000	
UFC Fight Night 103	Augusto Mendes	vs.	Frankie Saenz	Yair Rodríguez	Alexey Oleynik	$50,000	
UFC 207	Cody Garbrandt	vs.	Dominick Cruz	Amanda Nunes	Alex Garcia	$50,000	
UFC on Fox 22	Leslie Smith	vs.	Irene Aldana	Michelle Waterson	Paul Craig	$50,000	
UFC 206	Cub Swanson	vs.	Choi Doo-ho	Max Holloway	Lando Vannata	$50,000	
UFC Fight Night 102	Gian Villante	vs.	Saparbek Safarov	Francis Ngannou	Gerald Meerschaert	$50,000	
TUF 24 Finale	Jared Cannonier	vs.	Ion Cuțelaba	Sara McMann	Anthony Smith	$50,000	
UFC Fight Night 101	Robert Whittaker	vs.	Derek Brunson	Robert Whittaker	Tyson Pedro	$50,000	
UFC Fight Night 100	—N/a			Thomas Almeida	Cezar Ferreira	$50,000	
UFC Fight Night 100	—N/a			Gadzhimurad Antigulov	Pedro Munhoz	$50,000	
UFC Fight Night 99	—N/a			Jack Marshman	Kevin Lee	$50,000	
UFC Fight Night 99	—N/a			Justin Ledet	Abdul Razak Alhassan	$50,000	
UFC 205	Tyron Woodley	vs.	Stephen Thompson	Conor McGregor	Yoel Romero	$50,000	
UFC Fight Night 98	Tony Ferguson	vs.	Rafael dos Anjos	Ricardo Lamas	Douglas Silva de Andrade	$50,000	
UFC 204	Michael Bisping	vs.	Dan Henderson	Jimi Manuwa	Iuri Alcântara	$50,000	
UFC Fight Night 96	—N/a			Brandon Moreno	Luis Henrique da Silva	$50,000	
UFC Fight Night 96	—N/a			Nate Marquardt	Curtis Blaydes	$50,000	
UFC Fight Night 95	Erick Silva	vs.	Luan Chagas	Vicente Luque	Eric Spicely	$50,000	
UFC Fight Night 94	Evan Dunham	vs.	Ricky Glenn	Michael Johnson	Chas Skelly	$50,000	
UFC 203	Stipe Miocic	vs.	Alistair Overeem	Jéssica Andrade	Yancy Medeiros	$50,000	
UFC Fight Night 93	Josh Barnett	vs.	Andrei Arlovski	Josh Barnett	Ryan Bader	$50,000	
UFC on Fox 21	Jim Miller	vs.	Joe Lauzon	Demian Maia	Paige VanZant	$50,000	
UFC 202	Conor McGregor	vs.	Nate Diaz	Anthony Johnson	Donald Cerrone	$50,000	
UFC Fight Night 92	Yair Rodríguez	vs.	Alex Caceres	Marcin Tybura	Viktor Pešta	$50,000	
UFC 201	Karolina Kowalkiewicz	vs.	Rose Namajunas	Tyron Woodley	Jake Ellenberger	$50,000	
UFC on Fox 20	Jason Knight	vs.	Jim Alers	Felice Herrig	Eddie Wineland	$50,000	
UFC Fight Night 91	Tony Ferguson	vs.	Lando Vannata	John Lineker	Louis Smolka	$50,000	
UFC 200	—N/a			Amanda Nunes	Cain Velasquez	$50,000	
UFC 200	—N/a			Joe Lauzon	Gegard Mousasi	$50,000	
TUF 23 Finale	Joanna Jędrzejczyk	vs.	Cláudia Gadelha	Tatiana Suarez	Choi Doo-ho	$50,000	
UFC Fight Night 90	Alan Jouban	vs.	Belal Muhammad	Eddie Alvarez	Pedro Munhoz	$50,000	
UFC Fight Night 89	Steve Bossé	vs.	Sean O'Connell	Donald Cerrone	Krzysztof Jotko	$50,000	
UFC 199	Polo Reyes	vs.	Dong Hyun Ma	Michael Bisping	Dan Henderson	$50,000	
UFC Fight Night 88	Jeremy Stephens	vs.	Renan Barão	Cody Garbrandt	Jake Collier	$50,000	
UFC 198	Francisco Trinaldo	vs.	Yancy Medeiros	Stipe Miocic	Ronaldo Souza	$50,000	
UFC Fight Night 87	—N/a			Alistair Overeem	Stefan Struve	$50,000	
UFC Fight Night 87	—N/a			Gunnar Nelson	Germaine de Randamie	$50,000	
UFC 197	Danny Roberts	vs.	Dominique Steele	Demetrious Johnson	Yair Rodríguez	$50,000	
UFC on Fox 19	Elizeu Zaleski dos Santos	vs.	Omari Akhmedov	Glover Teixeira	Michael Chiesa	$50,000	
UFC Fight Night 86	—N/a			Derrick Lewis	Alejandro Pérez	$50,000	
UFC Fight Night 86	—N/a			Mairbek Taisumov	Jared Cannonier	$50,000	
UFC Fight Night 85	Jake Matthews	vs.	Johnny Case	Mark Hunt	Neil Magny	$50,000	
UFC 196	Nate Diaz	vs.	Conor McGregor	Nate Diaz	Miesha Tate	$50,000	
UFC Fight Night 84	Michael Bisping	vs.	Anderson Silva	Teemu Packalén	Scott Askham	$50,000	
UFC Fight Night 83	Lauren Murphy	vs.	Kelly Faszholz	Donald Cerrone	Chris Camozzi	$50,000	
UFC Fight Night 82	Mike Pyle	vs.	Sean Spencer	Stephen Thompson	Diego Rivas	$50,000	
UFC on Fox 18	Jimmie Rivera	vs.	Iuri Alcântara	Anthony Johnson	Ben Rothwell	$50,000	
UFC Fight Night 81	Dominick Cruz	vs.	T.J. Dillashaw	Ed Herman	Luke Sanders	$50,000	
UFC 195	Robbie Lawler	vs.	Carlos Condit	Stipe Miocic	Michael McDonald	$50,000	
UFC on Fox 17	Nate Diaz	vs.	Michael Johnson	Rafael dos Anjos	Vicente Luque	$50,000	
UFC 194	Luke Rockhold	vs.	Chris Weidman	Conor McGregor	Leonardo Santos	$50,000	
TUF 22 Finale	Tony Ferguson	vs.	Edson Barboza	Frankie Edgar	Tony Ferguson	$50,000	
UFC Fight Night 80	Michael Chiesa	vs.	Jim Miller	Rose Namajunas	Tim Means	$50,000	
UFC Fight Night 79	Seo Hee Ham	vs.	Cortney Casey	Choi Doo-ho	Dominique Steele	$50,000	
UFC Fight Night 78	Neil Magny	vs.	Kelvin Gastelum	Andre Fili	Polo Reyes	$50,000	
UFC 193	Holly Holm	vs.	Ronda Rousey	Holly Holm	Kyle Noke	$50,000	
UFC Fight Night 77	—N/a			Vitor Belfort	Thomas Almeida	$50,000	
UFC Fight Night 77	—N/a			Alex Oliveira	Thiago Tavares	$50,000	
UFC Fight Night 76	Nicolas Dalby	vs.	Darren Till	Neil Seery	Tom Breese	$50,000	
UFC 192	Daniel Cormier	vs.	Alexander Gustafsson	Albert Tumenov	Adriano Martins	$50,000	
UFC Fight Night 75	—N/a			Josh Barnett	Uriah Hall	$50,000	
UFC Fight Night 75	—N/a			Diego Brandão	Keita Nakamura	$50,000	
UFC 191	John Lineker	vs.	Francisco Rivera	Anthony Johnson	Raquel Pennington	$50,000	
UFC Fight Night 74	Patrick Côté	vs.	Josh Burkman	Frankie Perez	Felipe Arantes	$50,000	
UFC Fight Night 73	Glover Teixeira	vs.	Ovince Saint Preux	Amanda Nunes	Marlon Vera	$50,000	
UFC 190	Maurício Rua	vs.	Antônio Rogério Nogueira	Ronda Rousey	Demian Maia	$50,000	
UFC on Fox 16	Edson Barboza	vs.	Paul Felder	T.J. Dillashaw	Tom Lawlor	$50,000	
UFC Fight Night 72	Joanne Calderwood	vs.	Cortney Casey	Joseph Duffy	Stevie Ray	$50,000	
UFC Fight Night 71	Alan Jouban	vs.	Matt Dwyer	Frank Mir	Tony Ferguson	$50,000	
TUF 21 Finale	—N/a			Stephen Thompson	Kamaru Usman	$50,000	
TUF 21 Finale	—N/a			Jorge Masvidal	Josh Samman	$50,000	
UFC 189	Robbie Lawler	vs.	Rory MacDonald	Conor McGregor	Thomas Almeida	$50,000	
UFC Fight Night 70	Lorenz Larkin	vs.	Santiago Ponzinibbio	Yoel Romero	Thiago Santos	$50,000	
UFC Fight Night 69	Joanna Jędrzejczyk	vs.	Jessica Penne	Mairbek Taisumov	Arnold Allen	$50,000	
UFC 188	Yair Rodríguez	vs.	Charles Rosa	Fabrício Werdum	Patrick Williams	$50,000	
UFC Fight Night 68	Brian Ortega	vs.	Thiago Tavares	Dustin Poirier	Shawn Jordan	$50,000	
UFC Fight Night 67	Charles Oliveira	vs.	Nik Lentz	Rony Jason^{8}	Charles Oliveira	$50,000	
UFC 187	Andrei Arlovski	vs.	Travis Browne	Chris Weidman	Daniel Cormier	$50,000	
UFC Fight Night 66	Jon Delos Reyes	vs.	Roldan Sangcha-an	Neil Magny	Jon Tuck	$50,000	
UFC Fight Night 65	—N/a			Robert Whittaker	James Vick	$50,000	
UFC Fight Night 65	—N/a			Dan Hooker	Alex Chambers	$50,000	
UFC 186	Chad Laprise	vs.	Bryan Barberena	Demetrious Johnson	Thomas Almeida	$50,000	
UFC on Fox 15	Gian Villante	vs.	Corey Anderson	Luke Rockhold	Max Holloway	$50,000	
UFC Fight Night 64	Mirko Filipović	vs.	Gabriel Gonzaga	Leon Edwards	Maryna Moroz	$50,000	
UFC Fight Night 63	—N/a			Chad Mendes	Julianna Peña	$50,000	
UFC Fight Night 63	—N/a			Dustin Poirier	Timothy Johnson	$50,000	
UFC Fight Night 62	—N/a			Gilbert Burns	Godofredo Pepey	$50,000	
UFC Fight Night 62	—N/a			Kevin Souza	Fredy Serrano	$50,000	
UFC 185	—N/a			Rafael dos Anjos	Joanna Jędrzejczyk	$50,000	
UFC 185	—N/a			Ross Pearson	Beneil Dariush	$50,000	
UFC 184	—N/a			Tony Ferguson	Tim Means	$50,000	
UFC 184	—N/a			Ronda Rousey	Jake Ellenberger	$50,000	
UFC Fight Night 61	—N/a			Frank Mir	Sam Alvey	$50,000	
UFC Fight Night 61	—N/a			Matt Dwyer	Marion Reneau	$50,000	
UFC Fight Night 60	Benson Henderson	vs.	Brandon Thatch	Ray Borg	Neil Magny	$50,000	
UFC 183	Thales Leites	vs.	Tim Boetsch	Thales Leites	Thiago Alves	$50,000	
UFC on Fox 14	—N/a			Anthony Johnson	Gegard Mousasi	$50,000	
UFC on Fox 14	—N/a			Kenny Robertson	Makwan Amirkhani	$50,000	
UFC Fight Night 59	Sean O'Connell	vs.	Matt Van Buren	Conor McGregor	Lorenz Larkin	$50,000	
UFC 182	Jon Jones	vs.	Daniel Cormier	Paul Felder	Shawn Jordan	$50,000	
UFC Fight Night 58	—N/a			Lyoto Machida	Renan Barão	$50,000	
UFC Fight Night 58	—N/a			Vitor Miranda	Erick Silva	$50,000	
UFC on Fox 13	Junior dos Santos	vs.	Stipe Miocic	Matt Mitrione	Ian Entwistle	$50,000	
TUF 20 Finale	Jessica Penne	vs.	Randa Markos	Carla Esparza	Yancy Medeiros	$50,000	
UFC 181	Sergio Pettis	vs.	Matt Hobar	Josh Samman	Anthony Pettis	$50,000	
UFC Fight Night 57	Paige VanZant	vs.	Kailin Curran	Alexey Oleynik	Frankie Edgar	$50,000	
UFC 180	Henry Briones	vs.	Guido Cannetti	Fabrício Werdum	Kelvin Gastelum	$50,000	
UFC Fight Night 56	Thomas Almeida	vs.	Tim Gorman	Ovince Saint Preux	Leandro Silva	$50,000	
UFC Fight Night 55	Robert Whittaker	vs.	Clint Hester	Louis Smolka	Luke Rockhold	$50,000	
UFC 179	José Aldo	vs.	Chad Mendes	Fábio Maldonado	Gilbert Burns	$50,000	
UFC Fight Night 54	Patrick Holohan	vs.	Chris Kelades	Rory MacDonald	Olivier Aubin-Mercier	$50,000	
UFC Fight Night 53	Dennis Siver	vs.	Charles Rosa	Mike Wilkinson	Max Holloway	$50,000	
UFC 178	Tim Kennedy	vs.	Yoel Romero	Conor McGregor	Dominick Cruz	$50,000	
UFC Fight Night 52	Kang Kyung-ho	vs.	Michinori Tanaka	Mark Hunt	Johnny Case	$50,000	
UFC Fight Night 51	Gleison Tibau	vs.	Piotr Hallmann^{7}	Andrei Arlovski	Godofredo Pepey	$50,000	
UFC Fight Night 50	Joe Lauzon	vs.	Michael Chiesa	Ben Rothwell	Ronaldo Souza	$50,000	
UFC 177	Ramsey Nijem	vs.	Carlos Diego Ferreira	T.J. Dillashaw	Yancy Medeiros	$50,000	
UFC Fight Night 49	—N/a			Rafael dos Anjos	Jordan Mein	$50,000	
UFC Fight Night 49	—N/a			Thales Leites	Ben Saunders	$50,000	
UFC Fight Night 48	—N/a			Michael Bisping	Tyron Woodley	$50,000	
UFC Fight Night 48	—N/a			Alberto Mina	Ulka Sasaki	$50,000	
UFC Fight Night 47	Alan Jouban	vs.	Seth Baczynski	Tim Boetsch	Thiago Tavares	$50,000	
UFC on Fox 12	Matt Brown	vs.	Robbie Lawler	Anthony Johnson	Dennis Bermudez	$50,000	
UFC Fight Night 46	Cathal Pendred	vs.	Mike King^{6}	Conor McGregor	Gunnar Nelson	$50,000	
UFC Fight Night 45	John Lineker	vs.	Alptekin Özkiliç	Donald Cerrone	Lucas Martins	$50,000	
TUF 19 Finale	Leandro Issa	vs.	Jumabieke Tuerxun	Adriano Martins	Leandro Issa	$50,000	
UFC 175	Chris Weidman	vs.	Lyoto Machida	Ronda Rousey	Rob Font	$50,000	
UFC Fight Night 44	Cub Swanson	vs.	Jeremy Stephens	Ray Borg	Carlos Diego Ferreira	$50,000	
UFC Fight Night 43	Gian Villante	vs.	Sean O'Connell	Nate Marquardt	Charles Oliveira	$50,000	
UFC 174	Tae Hyun Bang	vs.	Kajan Johnson	Tae Hyun Bang	Kiichi Kunimoto	$50,000	
UFC Fight Night 42	Scott Jorgensen	vs.	Danny Martinez	Piotr Hallmann	Benson Henderson	$50,000	
TUF Brazil 3 Finale	Kevin Souza	vs.	Mark Eddiva	Stipe Miocic	Warlley Alves	$50,000	
UFC Fight Night 41	—N/a			Magnus Cedenblad	Niklas Bäckström	$50,000	
UFC Fight Night 41	—N/a			C. B. Dollaway	Gegard Mousasi	$50,000	
UFC 173	T.J. Dillashaw	vs.	Renan Barão	T.J. Dillashaw	Mitch Clarke	$50,000	
UFC Fight Night 40	Matt Brown	vs.	Erick Silva	Johnny Eduardo	Matt Brown	$50,000	
UFC 172	Takanori Gomi	vs.	Isaac Vallie-Flagg	Joseph Benavidez	Chris Beal	$50,000	
UFC on Fox 11	Thiago Alves	vs.	Seth Baczynski	Alex White	Donald Cerrone	$50,000	
TUF Nations Finale	Dustin Poirier	vs.	Akira Corassani	K. J. Noons	Ryan Jimmo	$50,000	
UFC Fight Night 39	Clay Guida	vs.	Tatsuya Kawajiri	Roy Nelson	Ramsey Nijem	$50,000	
UFC Fight Night 38	Dan Henderson	vs.	Maurício Rua	Dan Henderson	Godofredo Pepey	$50,000	
UFC 171	Johny Hendricks	vs.	Robbie Lawler	Dennis Bermudez	Ovince Saint Preux	$50,000	
UFC Fight Night 37	Alexander Gustafsson	vs.	Jimi Manuwa	Alexander Gustafsson	Gunnar Nelson	$50,000	
TUF China Finale	Kazuki Tokudome	vs.	Yui Chul Nam	Dong Hyun Kim	Matt Mitrione	$50,000	
UFC 170	Rory MacDonald	vs.	Demian Maia	Ronda Rousey	Stephen Thompson	$50,000	
UFC Fight Night 36	Lyoto Machida	vs.	Gegard Mousasi	Erick Silva	Charles Oliveira	$50,000	
UFC 169	Jamie Varner	vs.	Abel Trujillo	Abel Trujillo	—N/a	$75,000 for FOTN; $50,000 for KOTN	
UFC on Fox 10	Alex Caceres	vs.	Sergio Pettis	Donald Cerrone	Alex Caceres	$50,000	
UFC Fight Night 35	Yoel Romero	vs.	Derek Brunson	Luke Rockhold	Cole Miller	$50,000	
UFC Fight Night 34	Tarec Saffiedine	vs.	Hyun Gyu Lim	Max Holloway	Russell Doane	$50,000	
UFC 168	Ronda Rousey	vs.	Miesha Tate	Travis Browne	Ronda Rousey	$75,000	
UFC on Fox 9	Edson Barboza	vs.	Danny Castillo	Demetrious Johnson	Urijah Faber	$50,000	
UFC Fight Night 33	Mark Hunt	vs.	Antônio Silva^{5}	Maurício Rua	—N/a	$50,000	
TUF 18 Finale	Josh Sampo^{4}	vs.	Ryan Benoit	Nate Diaz	Chris Holdsworth	$50,000	
UFC 167	Georges St-Pierre	vs.	Johny Hendricks	Tyron Woodley	Donald Cerrone	$50,000	
UFC Fight Night 32	Thiago Perpetuo	vs.	Omari Akhmedov	Vitor Belfort	Adriano Martins	$50,000	
UFC: Fight for the Troops 3	Jorge Masvidal	vs.	Rustam Khabilov	Tim Kennedy	Michael Chiesa	$50,000	
UFC Fight Night 30	Luke Barnatt	vs.	Andrew Craig	Lyoto Machida	Nicholas Musoke	$50,000	
UFC 166	Gilbert Melendez	vs.	Diego Sanchez	John Dodson	Tony Ferguson	$60,000	
UFC Fight Night 29	Raphael Assunção	vs.	T.J. Dillashaw	Dong Hyun Kim	—N/a	$50,000	
UFC 165	Jon Jones	vs.	Alexander Gustafsson	Renan Barão	Mitch Gagnon	$50,000	
UFC Fight Night 28	Rafael Natal	vs.	Tor Troéng	Glover Teixeira	Piotr Hallmann	$50,000	
UFC 164	Pascal Krauss	vs.	Hyun Gyu Lim	Chad Mendes	Anthony Pettis	$50,000	
UFC Fight Night 27	Carlos Condit	vs.	Martin Kampmann	Brandon Thatch	Zak Cummings	$50,000	
UFC Fight Night 26	Michael McDonald	vs.	Brad Pickett	Travis Browne	Michael McDonald	$50,000	
UFC Fight Night 26	Michael McDonald	vs.	Brad Pickett	Matt Brown	Chael Sonnen	$50,000	
UFC 163	Ian McCall	vs.	Iliarde Santos	Anthony Perosh	Sergio Moraes	$50,000	
UFC on Fox 8	Ed Herman	vs.	Trevor Smith	Melvin Guillard	Demetrious Johnson	$50,000	
UFC 162	Frankie Edgar	vs.	Charles Oliveira	Chris Weidman	—N/a	$50,000	
UFC 162	Cub Swanson	vs.	Dennis Siver	Chris Weidman	—N/a	$50,000	
UFC 161	James Krause	vs.	Sam Stout	Shawn Jordan	James Krause	$50,000	
UFC on Fuel TV 10	Thiago Silva	vs.	Rafael Cavalcante	Thiago Silva	Erick Silva	$50,000	
UFC 160	Junior dos Santos	vs.	Mark Hunt	T. J. Grant	Glover Teixeira	$50,000	
UFC on FX 8	Lucas Martins	vs.	Jeremy Larsen	Vitor Belfort	Ronaldo Souza	$50,000	
UFC 159	Pat Healy^{3}	vs.	Jim Miller	Roy Nelson	Bryan Caraway ^{3}	$65,000	
UFC on Fox 7	Matt Brown	vs.	Jordan Mein	Josh Thomson	—N/a	$50,000	
UFC on Fox 7	Matt Brown	vs.	Jordan Mein	Yoel Romero	—N/a	$50,000	
TUF 17 Finale	Cat Zingano	vs.	Miesha Tate	Travis Browne	Daniel Pineda	$50,000	
UFC on Fuel TV 9	Brad Pickett	vs.	Mike Easton	Conor McGregor	Reza Madadi	$60,000	
UFC 158	Johny Hendricks	vs.	Carlos Condit	Jake Ellenberger	—N/a	$50,000	
UFC on Fuel TV 8	Wanderlei Silva	vs.	Brian Stann	Wanderlei Silva	—N/a	$50,000	
UFC on Fuel TV 8	Wanderlei Silva	vs.	Brian Stann	Mark Hunt	—N/a	$50,000	
UFC 157	Dennis Bermudez	vs.	Matt Grice	Robbie Lawler	Kenny Robertson	$50,000	
UFC on Fuel TV 7	Tom Watson	vs.	Stanislav Nedkov	Tom Watson	Renan Barão	$50,000	
UFC 156	José Aldo	vs.	Frankie Edgar	Antônio Silva	Bobby Green	$50,000	
UFC on Fox 6	Demetrious Johnson	vs.	John Dodson	Anthony Pettis	Ryan Bader	$50,000	
UFC on FX 7	C. B. Dollaway	vs.	Daniel Sarafian	Vitor Belfort	Ildemar Alcantara	$50,000	
UFC 155	Jim Miller	vs.	Joe Lauzon	Todd Duffee	John Moraga	$65,000	
TUF 16 Finale	Jared Papazian	vs.	Tim Elliott	Pat Barry	TJ Waldburger	$40,000	
UFC on FX 6	Nick Penner	vs.	Cody Donovan	Ben Alloway	—N/a	$40,000	
UFC on Fox 5	Scott Jorgensen	vs.	John Albert	Yves Edwards	Scott Jorgensen	$65,000	
UFC 154	Georges St-Pierre	vs.	Carlos Condit	Johny Hendricks	Ivan Menjivar	$70,000	
UFC on Fuel TV 6	Takanori Gomi	vs.	Mac Danzig	Cung Le	Thiago Silva	$40,000	
UFC 153	Jon Fitch	vs.	Erick Silva	Rony Mariano Bezerra	Antônio Rodrigo Nogueira	$70,000	
UFC on FX 5	Diego Nunes	vs.	Bart Palaszewski	Michael Johnson	Justin Edwards	$40,000	
UFC on Fuel TV 5	Stefan Struve	vs.	Stipe Miocic	Brad Pickett	Matt Wiman	$40,000	
UFC 152	T. J. Grant	vs.	Evan Dunham	Cub Swanson	Jon Jones	$65,000	
UFC 150	Donald Cerrone	vs.	Melvin Guillard	Donald Cerrone	Dennis Bermudez	$60,000	
UFC on Fox 4	Joe Lauzon	vs.	Jamie Varner	Mike Swick	Joe Lauzon	$50,000	
UFC 149	Bryan Caraway	vs.	Mitch Gagnon	Ryan Jimmo	Matt Riddle	$65,000	
UFC on Fuel TV 4	James Te-Huna	vs.	Joey Beltran	Chris Weidman	Alex Caceres	$40,000	
UFC 148	Forrest Griffin	vs.	Tito Ortiz	Anderson Silva	—N/a	$75,000	
UFC 147	Rich Franklin	vs.	Wanderlei Silva	Marcos Vinicius	Rodrigo Damm	$65,000	
UFC on FX 4	Sam Stout	vs.	Spencer Fisher	Cub Swanson	Dan Miller	$50,000	
UFC on FX 3	Eddie Wineland	vs.	Scott Jorgensen	Mike Pyle	Erick Silva	$40,000	
TUF 15 Finale	Justin Lawrence	vs.	John Cofer	Martin Kampmann	Mike Chiesa	$40,000	
TUF 15 Finale	Justin Lawrence	vs.	John Cofer	Justin Lawrence	Mike Chiesa	$40,000	
UFC 146	—N/a			Dan Hardy	Paul Sass	$70,000	
UFC 146	—N/a			Roy Nelson	Stefan Struve	$70,000	
UFC on Fuel TV 3	Dustin Poirier	vs.	Chan-Sung Jung	Tom Lawlor	Chan-Sung Jung	$40,000	
UFC on Fox 3	Louis Gaudinot	vs.	John Lineker	Lavar Johnson	Nate Diaz	$65,000	
UFC 145	Mark Hominick	vs.	Eddie Yagin	Ben Rothwell	Travis Browne	$65,000	
UFC on Fuel TV 2	Brad Pickett	vs.	Damacio Page	Siyar Bahadurzada	John Maguire	$50,000	
UFC on FX 2	Demetrious Johnson	vs.	Ian McCall	Joseph Benavidez	Martin Kampmann	$50,000	
UFC 144	Frankie Edgar	vs.	Benson Henderson	Anthony Pettis	Vaughan Lee	$65,000	
UFC on Fuel TV 1	Diego Sanchez	vs.	Jake Ellenberger	Stipe Miocic	Ivan Menjivar	$50,000	
UFC 143	Roy Nelson	vs.	Fabrício Werdum	Stephen Thompson	Dustin Poirier	$65,000	
UFC on Fox 2	Evan Dunham	vs.	Nik Lentz	Lavar Johnson	Charles Oliveira	$65,000	
UFC on FX 1	Pat Barry	vs.	Christian Morecraft	Nick Denis	Jim Miller	$45,000	
UFC 142	Edson Barboza	vs.	Terry Etim	Edson Barboza	Rousimar Palhares	$65,000	
UFC 141	Nate Diaz	vs.	Donald Cerrone	Johny Hendricks	—N/a	$75,000	
UFC 140	Jon Jones	vs.	Lyoto Machida	Chan-Sung Jung	Frank Mir	$75,000	
TUF 14 Finale	Diego Brandão	vs.	Dennis Bermudez	John Dodson	Diego Brandão	$40,000	
UFC 139	Wanderlei Silva	vs.	Cung Le	Michael McDonald	Urijah Faber	$70,000	
UFC 139	Maurício Rua	vs.	Dan Henderson	Michael McDonald	Urijah Faber	$70,000	
UFC on Fox 1	Clay Guida	vs.	Benson Henderson	Junior dos Santos	Ricardo Lamas	$65,000	
UFC 138	Brad Pickett	vs.	Renan Barão	Che Mills	Terry Etim	$70,000	
UFC 137	B.J. Penn	vs.	Nick Diaz	Bart Palaszewski	Donald Cerrone	$75,000	
UFC 136	Leonard Garcia	vs.	Nam Phan	Frankie Edgar	Joe Lauzon	$75,000	
UFC on Versus 6	Matt Wiman	vs.	Mac Danzig	Anthony Johnson	Stefan Struve	$65,000	
UFC 135	Jon Jones	vs.	Quinton Jackson	Josh Koscheck	Nate Diaz	$75,000	
UFC Fight Night 25	Matt Riddle	vs.	Lance Benoist	Jake Ellenberger	TJ Waldburger	$55,000	
UFC 134	Ross Pearson	vs.	Edson Barboza	Antônio Rodrigo Nogueira	—N/a	$100,000	
UFC on Versus 5	Dan Hardy	vs.	Chris Lytle	Donald Cerrone	Chris Lytle	$65,000	
UFC 133	Rashad Evans	vs.	Tito Ortiz	Vitor Belfort	—N/a	$70,000^{2}	
UFC 132	Dominick Cruz	vs.	Urijah Faber	Carlos Condit	Tito Ortiz	$75,000	
UFC on Versus 4	Nik Lentz	vs.	Charles Oliveira	Cheick Kongo	Joe Lauzon	$50,000	
UFC 131	Dave Herman	vs.	Jon Olav Einemo	Sam Stout	Chris Weidman	$70,000	
TUF 13 Finale	Kyle Kingsbury	vs.	Fabio Maldonado	Tony Ferguson	Reuben Duran	$40,000	
UFC 130	Brian Stann	vs.	Jorge Santiago	Travis Browne	Gleison Tibau	$70,000	
UFC 129	José Aldo	vs.	Mark Hominick	Lyoto Machida	Pablo Garza	$129,000	
UFC Fight Night 24	Michael McDonald	vs.	Edwin Figueroa	Johny Hendricks	Chan-Sung Jung	$55,000	
UFC 128	Edson Barboza	vs.	Anthony Njokuani	Brendan Schaub	—N/a	$70,000	
UFC 128	Edson Barboza	vs.	Anthony Njokuani	Erik Koch	—N/a	$70,000	
UFC on Versus 3	Diego Sanchez	vs.	Martin Kampmann	Shane Roller	Brian Bowles	$160,000 each for FOTN; $40,000 each for KOTN, SOTN	
UFC 127	Brian Ebersole	vs.	Chris Lytle	Mark Hunt	Kyle Noke	$75,000	
UFC 126	Donald Cerrone	vs.	Paul Kelly	Anderson Silva	Jon Jones	$75,000	
UFC: Fight for the Troops 2	Yves Edwards	vs.	Cody McKenzie	Melvin Guillard	Yves Edwards	$30,000	
UFC 125	Frankie Edgar	vs.	Gray Maynard	Jeremy Stephens	Clay Guida	$60,000	
UFC 124	Georges St-Pierre	vs.	Josh Koscheck	Mac Danzig	Mark Bocek	$100,000 each for FOTN^{1}, KOTN; $50,000 for SOTN	
UFC 124	Georges St-Pierre	vs.	Josh Koscheck	Mac Danzig	Jim Miller	$100,000 each for FOTN^{1}, KOTN; $50,000 for SOTN	
TUF 12 Finale	Leonard Garcia	vs.	Nam Phan	Pablo Garza	Cody McKenzie	$30,000	
UFC 123	George Sotiropoulos	vs.	Joe Lauzon	B.J. Penn	Phil Davis	$80,000	
UFC 122	Pascal Krauss	vs.	Mark Scanlon	Karlos Vemola	Dennis Siver	$60,000	
UFC 121	Diego Sanchez	vs.	Paulo Thiago	Cain Velasquez	Daniel Roberts	$70,000	
UFC 120	Michael Bisping	vs.	Yoshihiro Akiyama	Carlos Condit	Paul Sass	$50,000	
UFC 119	Sean Sherk	vs.	Evan Dunham	—N/a	C. B. Dollaway	$70,000	
UFC 119	Matt Mitrione	vs.	Joey Beltran	—N/a	C. B. Dollaway	$70,000	
UFC Fight Night 22	Jared Hamman	vs.	Kyle Kingsbury	Brian Foster	Cole Miller	$40,000	
UFC Fight Night 22	Jared Hamman	vs.	Kyle Kingsbury	Brian Foster	Charles Oliveira	$40,000	
UFC 118	Nate Diaz	vs.	Marcus Davis	—N/a	Joe Lauzon	$60,000	
UFC 117	Anderson Silva	vs.	Chael Sonnen	Stefan Struve	Anderson Silva	$60,000	
UFC 117	Anderson Silva	vs.	Chael Sonnen	Stefan Struve	Matt Hughes	$60,000	
UFC on Versus 2	Brian Stann	vs.	Mike Massenzio	Takanori Gomi	Charles Oliveira	$40,000	
UFC 116	Stephan Bonnar	vs.	Krzysztof Soszynski	Gerald Harris	Brock Lesnar	$75,000	
UFC 116	Chris Leben	vs.	Yoshihiro Akiyama	Gerald Harris	Brock Lesnar	$75,000	
TUF 11 Finale	Matt Hamill	vs.	Keith Jardine	Chris Leben	Court McGee	$25,000	
UFC 115	Carlos Condit	vs.	Rory MacDonald	Rich Franklin	Mirko Filipović	$85,000	
UFC 114	Antônio Rogério Nogueira	vs.	Jason Brilz	Mike Russow	Ryan Jensen	$65,000	
UFC 113	Jeremy Stephens	vs.	Sam Stout	Maurício Rua	Alan Belcher	$65,000	
UFC 112	Kendall Grove	vs.	Mark Muñoz	DaMarques Johnson	Rafael dos Anjos	$75,000	
UFC Fight Night 21	Ross Pearson	vs.	Dennis Siver	Roy Nelson	Kenny Florian	$30,000	
UFC 111	Rodney Wallace	vs.	Jared Hamman	Shane Carwin	Kurt Pellegrino	$65,000	
UFC on Versus 1	—N/a			John Howard	Clay Guida	$50,000	
UFC on Versus 1	—N/a			Jon Jones	Clay Guida	$50,000	
UFC on Versus 1	—N/a			Junior dos Santos	Clay Guida	$50,000	
UFC 110	Joe Stevenson	vs.	George Sotiropoulos	Cain Velasquez	Chris Lytle	$50,000	
UFC 109	Nate Marquardt	vs.	Chael Sonnen	Matt Serra	Paulo Thiago	$60,000	
UFC Fight Night 20	Tom Lawlor	vs.	Aaron Simpson	Gerald Harris	Evan Dunham	$30,000	
UFC 108	Joe Lauzon	vs.	Sam Stout	Paul Daley	Cole Miller	$50,000	
UFC 107	Alan Belcher	vs.	Wilson Gouveia	T. J. Grant	DaMarques Johnson	$65,000	
TUF 10 Finale	Frankie Edgar	vs.	Matt Veach	Roy Nelson	Mark Bocek	$25,000	
UFC 106	Josh Koscheck	vs.	Anthony Johnson	Antônio Rogério Nogueira	Josh Koscheck	$70,000	
UFC 105	Michael Bisping	vs.	Denis Kang	Dennis Siver	Terry Etim	$40,000	
UFC 104	Antoni Hardonk	vs.	Pat Barry	Pat Barry	Stefan Struve	$60,000	
UFC 103	Rick Story	vs.	Brian Foster	Vitor Belfort	Rick Story	$65,000	
UFC Fight Night 19	Nate Quarry	vs.	Tim Credeur	Jeremy Stephens	Nate Diaz	$30,000	
UFC 102	Antônio Rodrigo Nogueira	vs.	Randy Couture	Nate Marquardt	Jake Rosholt	$60,000	
UFC 101	Anderson Silva	vs.	Forrest Griffin	Anderson Silva	B.J. Penn	$60,000	
UFC 100	Yoshihiro Akiyama	vs.	Alan Belcher	Dan Henderson	Tom Lawlor	$100,000	
TUF 9 Finale	Diego Sanchez	vs.	Clay Guida	Tomasz Drwal	Jason Dent	$25,000	
TUF 9 Finale	Joe Stevenson	vs.	Nate Diaz	Tomasz Drwal	Jason Dent	$25,000	
TUF 9 Finale	Chris Lytle	vs.	Kevin Burns	Tomasz Drwal	Jason Dent	$25,000	
UFC 99	Rich Franklin	vs.	Wanderlei Silva	Mike Swick	Terry Etim	$60,000	
UFC 98	Matt Hughes	vs.	Matt Serra	Lyoto Machida	Brock Larson	$60,000	
UFC 97	Sam Stout	vs.	Matt Wiman	Maurício Rua	Krzysztof Soszynski	$70,000	
UFC Fight Night 18	Tyson Griffin	vs.	Rafael dos Anjos	Aaron Simpson	Rob Kimmons	$30,000	
UFC 96	Quinton Jackson	vs.	Keith Jardine	Matt Hamill	—N/a	$60,000	
UFC 95	Diego Sanchez	vs.	Joe Stevenson	Paulo Thiago	Demian Maia	$40,000	
UFC Fight Night 17	Mac Danzig	vs.	Josh Neer	Cain Velasquez	Joe Lauzon	$30,000	
UFC 94	Clay Guida	vs.	Nate Diaz	Lyoto Machida	—N/a	$65,000	
UFC 94	John Howard	vs.	Chris Wilson	Lyoto Machida	—N/a	$65,000	
UFC 93	Marcus Davis	vs.	Chris Lytle	Dennis Siver	Alan Belcher	$40,000	
UFC 93	Maurício Rua	vs.	Mark Coleman	Dennis Siver	Alan Belcher	$40,000	
UFC 92	Rashad Evans	vs.	Forrest Griffin	Quinton Jackson	—N/a	$60,000	
TUF 8 Finale	Junie Browning	vs.	Dave Kaplan	Anthony Johnson	Krzysztof Soszynski	$25,000	
UFC: Fight for the Troops	Jim Miller	vs.	Matt Wiman	Josh Koscheck	Steve Cantwell	$30,000	
UFC 91	Aaron Riley	vs.	Jorge Gurgel	Jeremy Stephens	Dustin Hazelett	$60,000	
UFC 90	Sean Sherk	vs.	Tyson Griffin	Junior dos Santos	Spencer Fisher	$65,000	
UFC 89	Chris Lytle	vs.	Paul Taylor	Luiz Cane	Jim Miller	$40,000	
UFC Fight Night 15	Nate Diaz	vs.	Josh Neer	Alessio Sakara	Wilson Gouveia	$30,000	
UFC 88	Kurt Pellegrino	vs.	Thiago Tavares	Rashad Evans	Jason MacDonald	$60,000	
UFC 87	Georges St-Pierre	vs.	Jon Fitch	Rob Emerson	Demian Maia	$60,000	
UFC Fight Night 14	Hermes Franca	vs.	Frankie Edgar	Rory Markham	C. B. Dollaway	$25,000	
UFC 86	Quinton Jackson	vs.	Forrest Griffin	Melvin Guillard	Cole Miller	$60,000	
TUF 7 Finale	Dustin Hazelett	vs.	Josh Burkman	Drew McFedries	Dustin Hazelett	$20,000	
UFC 85	Matt Wiman	vs.	Thiago Tavares	Thiago Alves	Kevin Burns	$50,000	
UFC 84	Wilson Gouveia	vs.	Goran Reljic	Wanderlei Silva	Rousimar Palhares	$75,000	
UFC 83	Jonathan Goulet	vs.	Kuniyoshi Hironaka	Jason MacDonald	Demian Maia	$75,000	
UFC Fight Night 13	Kenny Florian	vs.	Joe Lauzon	James Irvin	Nate Diaz	$20,000	
UFC 82	Anderson Silva	vs.	Dan Henderson	Chris Leben	Anderson Silva	$60,000	
UFC 81	Antônio Rodrigo Nogueira	vs.	Tim Sylvia	Chris Lytle	Frank Mir	$60,000	
UFC Fight Night 12	Gray Maynard	vs.	Dennis Siver	Patrick Côté	Nate Diaz	$40,000	
UFC 80	Paul Taylor	vs.	Paul Kelly	Wilson Gouveia	B.J. Penn	$35,000	
UFC 79	Wanderlei Silva	vs.	Chuck Liddell	Eddie Sanchez	Georges St-Pierre	$50,000	
TUF 6 Finale	Roger Huerta	vs.	Clay Guida	Jon Koppenhaver	Matt Arroyo	$15,000	
TUF 6 Finale	Jon Koppenhaver	vs.	Jared Rollins	Jon Koppenhaver	Matt Arroyo	$15,000	
UFC 78	Thiago Alves	vs.	Chris Lytle	Ed Herman	Akihiro Gono	$55,000	
UFC 77	Matt Grice	vs.	Jason Black	Anderson Silva	Demian Maia	$40,000	
UFC 76	Tyson Griffin	vs.	Thiago Tavares	—N/a	Forrest Griffin	$40,000	
UFC Fight Night 11	Cole Miller	vs.	Leonard Garcia	Chris Leben	Dustin Hazelett	$40,000	
UFC 75	Marcus Davis	vs.	Paul Taylor	Houston Alexander	Marcus Davis	$40,000	
UFC 74	Randy Couture	vs.	Gabriel Gonzaga	Patrick Côté	Thales Leites	$40,000	
UFC 73	Diego Saraiva	vs.	Jorge Gurgel	Anderson Silva	Chris Lytle	$40,000	
TUF 5 Finale	Gray Maynard	vs.	Rob Emerson	Cole Miller	Joe Lauzon	$40,000	
UFC 72	Clay Guida	vs.	Tyson Griffin	Marcus Davis	Ed Herman	$40,000	
UFC Fight Night 10	Sam Stout	vs.	Spencer Fisher	Drew McFedries	Thiago Tavares	$30,000	
UFC 71	Chris Leben	vs.	Kalib Starnes	Quinton Jackson	Din Thomas	$40,000	
UFC 70	Michael Bisping	vs.	Elvis Sinosic	Gabriel Gonzaga	Terry Etim	$30,000	
UFC 69	Roger Huerta	vs.	Leonard Garcia	Matt Serra	Kendall Grove		
UFC Fight Night 9	Kenny Florian	vs.	Dokonjonosuke Mishima	—N/a	Joe Stevenson		
UFC Fight Night 9	Kenny Florian	vs.	Dokonjonosuke Mishima	—N/a	Kurt Pellegrino		
UFC 68	Jason Lambert	vs.	Renato Sobral	Jason Lambert	Martin Kampmann		
UFC 67	Frankie Edgar	vs.	Tyson Griffin	Terry Martin	—N/a		
UFC Fight Night 8	Spencer Fisher	vs.	Hermes Franca	Rashad Evans	Ed Herman		
UFC 66	Chuck Liddell	vs.	Tito Ortiz	Keith Jardine	Jason MacDonald		
UFC 65	James Irvin	vs.	Hector Ramirez	Georges St-Pierre	Joe Stevenson		
TUF 4 Finale	Scott Smith	vs.	Pete Sell	—N/a	Travis Lutter		
UFC 64	Sean Sherk	vs.	Kenny Florian	Anderson Silva	Clay Guida		
Ortiz vs. Shamrock 3	Matt Hamill	vs.	Seth Petruzelli	Tito Ortiz	Jason MacDonald	$30,000	
UFC 63	Matt Hughes	vs.	B.J. Penn	Joe Lauzon	Tyson Griffin		
UFC 63	Roger Huerta	vs.	Jason Dent	Joe Lauzon	Tyson Griffin		
UFC 62	Hermes Franca	vs.	Jamie Varner	Chuck Liddell	Nick Diaz		
UFC Fight Night 6	Diego Sanchez	vs.	Karo Parisyan	Chris Leben	Joe Riggs		
UFC 61	Joe Stevenson	vs.	Yves Edwards	Jeff Monson	Hermes Franca		
UFC Fight Night 5	Jonathan Goulet	vs.	Luke Cummo	Anderson Silva	Rob MacDonald		
TUF 3 Finale	Kendall Grove	vs.	Ed Herman	Luigi Fioravanti	Kenny Florian		
TUF 3 Finale	Kendall Grove	vs.	Ed Herman	Luigi Fioravanti	Rory Singer		
UFC 59	Tito Ortiz	vs.	Forrest Griffin	—N/a	—N/a		
UFC Fight Night 4	Brad Imes	vs.	Dan Christison	—N/a	Dan Christison		
UFC Fight Night 3	Melvin Guillard	vs.	Josh Neer	—N/a	—N/a		

1. Fans voted to decide Fight of the Night.
2. Brian Ebersole was awarded an honorary "getting those horrifying shorts off TV as soon as possible" bonus for defeating Dennis Hallman.
3. Pat Healy was disqualified for Fight of the Night and Submission of the Night bonuses due to failing a post-fight drug test.
4. Ryan Benoit received Josh Sampo's Fight of the Night bonus due to Sampo missing weight.
5. Mark Hunt received Antônio Silva's Fight of the Night bonus due to Silva failing a post-fight drug test.
6. Mike King was disqualified for Fight of the Night bonus due to failing a post-fight drug test.
7. Piotr Hallmann was disqualified for Fight of the Night bonus due to failing a post-fight drug test.
8. Rony Jason was disqualified for Performance of the Night bonus due to failing a post-fight drug test.
9. Frank Camacho was disqualified for Fight of the Night bonus due to missing weight.
10. Robert Whittaker received Yoel Romero's Fight of the Night bonus due to Romero missing weight.
11. Jin Soo Son was disqualified for Fight of the Night bonus due to missing weight.
12. Tristan Connelly received Michel Pereira's Fight of the Night bonus due to Pereira missing weight.
13. Abdul Razak Alhassan was disqualified for Fight of the Night bonus due to missing weight, as a result a third Performance of the Night bonus was awarded.
14. Gregor Gillespie received Carlos Diego Ferreira's Fight of the Night bonus due to Ferreira missing weight.
15. Julian Erosa received Steven Peterson's Fight of the Night bonus due to Peterson missing weight.
16. Marlon Vera received Rob Font's Fight of the Night bonus due to Font missing weight.
17. André Lima was awarded an honorary "Bite of the Night" bonus at UFC on ESPN 53 after Igor Severino was disqualified for blantently biting him.
18. Nikolas Motta received a first ever Performance of the Night bonus for a losing fighter.
19. Sean Sharaf received a $100,000 "Proper Chaos Bonus" at UFC 331 to honor Paramount+ TV series MobLand.

== See also ==
- List of WEC bonus award recipients
- List of UFC encyclopedia award recipients
