= David Teymur =

Swedish kickboxer and mixed martial artist

- Born: 1 May 1989 (age 37); Järfälla, Sweden
- Nickname: Underkläder
- Height: 5 ft 9 in (1.75 m)
- Weight: 155 lb (70 kg; 11.1 st)
- Division: Lightweight
- Reach: 73 in (185 cm)
- Style: Muay Thai, Kickboxing
- Stance: Southpaw
- Fighting out of: Stockholm, Sweden
- Team: Allstars Training Center; Stockholm Kickboxing Team
- Years active: 2008–2013 (Muay Thai/Kickboxing); 2013–2019 (MMA)

Kickboxing record
- Total: 41
- Wins: 39
- By knockout: 11
- Losses: 2

Mixed martial arts record
- Total: 10
- Wins: 8
- By knockout: 4
- By decision: 4
- Losses: 2
- By submission: 1
- By decision: 1

Other information
- Notable relatives: Daniel Teymur, brother
- Mixed martial arts record from Sherdog

David Teymur
Medal record

Representing Sweden

Muay Thai

World Championships
Bronze medal – third place	2009 Bangkok	−67 kg

David Teymur (born 1 May 1989) is a Swedish professional mixed martial artist who competed in the lightweight division. He has previously competed in the Ultimate Fighting Championship.

== Kickboxing and Muay Thai career ==
David and his older brother Daniel started out doing Muay Thai as youths, David started in 2004 at the age of 15, they had grown up watching their older brother Gabriel competing in kickboxing and boxing.

David had a decorated amateur career, at the highest point when he won a bronze medal at the IFMA World Championship A-class in Bangkok, Thailand in 2009. He also won the Nordic Championship once (muay thai) and the Swedish national Championship three times (twice in muay thai, once in kickboxing).

He also competed professionally, where he completed a record of 39–2, with 11 wins by KO/TKO. He won the 2011 King of the Ring tournament in Oldenzaal, the Netherlands.

== Mixed martial arts career ==
=== Early career ===
Still competing in kickboxing and muay thai at the time, David and his brother Daniel Teymur started to train MMA in 2012–2013.

David made his MMA debut on 19 October 2013 at International Ring Fight Arena 5, where he lost by decision against Mattias Rosenlind.

He rebounded from the loss as he had his next two fights in the same promotion, defeating Veselin Dukov by unanimous decision on 5 April 2014, and on 22 November 2014 he defeated Gaik Pogosyan by a first-round TKO due to knees.

On 4 April 2015 he fought Robin Tuomi at Trophy MMA 6. Teymur won the fight by TKO due to leg kicks and punches in the first round.

=== The Ultimate Fighter ===
In August 2015 it was announced that Teymur was selected for The Ultimate Fighter: Team McGregor vs. Team Faber.

To get into the TUF house, he defeated Thibault Gouti by unanimous decision.

In the elimination round he fought Johnny Nuñez. Teymur dropped Nunez with knees to the body early and with a left hook late in the fight. He won the fight by unanimous decision.

In the quarter-finals he fought Marcin Wrzosek. He lost by majority decision.

=== Ultimate Fighting Championship ===
Teymur made his UFC debut against TUF teammate and fellow Swedish fighter Martin Svensson on 27 February 2016 at UFC Fight Night 84. He won the fight by TKO after he knocked Svensson down with an uppercut in the second round.

His next fight was against Jason Novelli on 6 August 2016 at UFC Fight Night 92. Teymur scored a knockdown from a straight left hand in round 1. In round 2 he scored two knockdowns, first by another straight left and moments later he won the fight by knockout after dropping Novelli to the canvas by a right-left hook combination.

In his third fight with the promotion Teymur took on highly touted Lando Vannata on 4 March 2017 in the co-main event at UFC 209. Despite coming in as a 3-1 underdog, Teymur got the upset and won the fight by unanimous decision. The fight was awarded Fight of the Night honors.

Teymur next fought undefeated Drakkar Klose on 2 December 2017 at UFC 218. He won the fight by unanimous decision.

Teymur was expected to face promotional newcomer Don Madge on 27 May 2018 at UFC Fight Night 130. However, Madge pulled out of the fight in late April with an undisclosed injury. As a result, Teymur was removed from the card entirely and rescheduled to face Nik Lentz the following week at UFC Fight Night 131. He won the fight by unanimous decision.

Teymur faced Charles Oliveira on 2 February 2019 at UFC Fight Night 144. He lost the fight via an anaconda choke submission in the second round.

== Personal life ==
Teymur's older brother, Daniel Teymur, is also a MMA fighter who was previously signed with the UFC. Both brothers transitioned to MMA from kickboxing and Muay Thai in 2012, making their debuts in 2013. A few years later both got into the UFC. David was signed in 2015 and Daniel in 2017. He is of Assyrian descent.

== Championships and accomplishments ==
=== Mixed martial arts ===
- Ultimate Fighting Championship
  - Fight of the Night (One time) vs. Lando Vannata
  - UFC.com Awards
    - 2017: Ranked #7 Fight of the Year vs. Lando Vannata
- Nordic MMA Awards - MMAviking.com
  - 2017 Fighter of the Year

=== Kickboxing and Muay Thai ===
- Professional
  - 2011 K-1 ‘’King of the Ring’’ (Holland) tournament winner
- Amateur
- IFMA
  - 2009 IFMA World Cup A-class Tournament (Bronze medal) (-67 kg)
- Regional championships
  - 2008 Swedish National Muay Thai Championship - (gold medal)(-63,5 kg)
  - 2009 Swedish National Muay Thai Championship - (silver medal) (silver medal) (-67 kg)
  - 2009 Nordic Muay Thai Championship - (gold medal) (-67 kg)
  - Gold medal - 2010 Swedish National Muay Thai Championship (-67 kg)
  - 2012 Swedish National Kickboxing Championship - (gold medal) (-71 kg)

== Mixed martial arts record ==
Professional record breakdown
10 matches	8 wins	2 losses
By knockout	4	0
By submission	0	1
By decision	4	1

Res.	Record	Opponent	Method	Event	Date	Round	Time	Location	Notes
Loss	8–2	Charles Oliveira	Submission (anaconda choke)	UFC Fight Night: Assunção vs. Moraes 2	2 February 2019	2	0:55	Fortaleza, Brazil	Teymur was deducted one point in round 1 due to an eye poke.
Win	8–1	Nik Lentz	Decision (unanimous)	UFC Fight Night: Rivera vs. Moraes	1 June 2018	3	5:00	Utica, New York, United States	
Win	7–1	Drakkar Klose	Decision (unanimous)	UFC 218	2 December 2017	3	5:00	Detroit, Michigan, United States	
Win	6–1	Lando Vannata	Decision (unanimous)	UFC 209	4 March 2017	3	5:00	Las Vegas, Nevada, United States	Fight of the Night.
Win	5–1	Jason Novelli	KO (punches)	UFC Fight Night: Rodríguez vs. Caceres	6 August 2016	2	1:25	Salt Lake City, Utah, United States	
Win	4–1	Martin Svensson	TKO (punches)	UFC Fight Night: Silva vs. Bisping	26 February 2016	2	1:26	London, England	
Win	3–1	Robin Tuomi	TKO (leg kicks and punches)	Trophy MMA 6	4 April 2015	1	N/A	Malmö, Sweden	Catchweight (159 lbs) bout.
Win	2–1	Gaik Pogosyan	TKO (knees)	International Ring Fight Arena 7	22 November 2014	1	2:57	Solna, Sweden	
Win	1–1	Veselin Dukov	Decision (unanimous)	International Ring Fight Arena 6	5 April 2014	3	5:00	Solna, Sweden	
Loss	0–1	Mattias Rosenlind	Decision (unanimous)	International Ring Fight Arena 5	19 October 2013	3	5:00	Solna, Sweden	Lightweight debut.

=== Mixed martial arts exhibition record ===
Exhibition record breakdown		
3 matches	2 wins	1 loss
By decision	2	1

Res.	Record	Opponent	Method	Event	Date	Round	Time	Location	Notes
Loss	2–1	Marcin Wrzosek	Decision (majority)	The Ultimate Fighter: Team McGregor vs. Team Faber	2 December 2015 (airdate)	2	5:00	Las Vegas, Nevada, United States	TUF 22 Quarter final round.
Win	2–0	Johnny Nuñez	Decision (unanimous)	The Ultimate Fighter: Team McGregor vs. Team Faber	11 November 2015 (airdate)	3	5:00	Las Vegas, Nevada, United States	TUF 22 Elimination round.
Win	1–0	Thibault Gouti	Decision (unanimous)	The Ultimate Fighter: Team McGregor vs. Team Faber	9 September 2015 (airdate)	2	5:00	Las Vegas, Nevada, United States	TUF 22 Qualifying round.

== See also ==
- List of male mixed martial artists
