= Lando Vannata =

American mixed martial arts fighter

- Born: Landon Anthony Vannata; March 14, 1992 (age 34); Neptune City, New Jersey, United States
- Other names: Groovy
- Height: 5 ft 9 in (1.75 m)
- Weight: 155 lb (70 kg; 11.1 st)
- Division: Featherweight (2021–present); Lightweight (2012–2020); Welterweight (2013)
- Reach: 71 in (180 cm)
- Team: Jackson Wink MMA Academy (2012–2018); BMF Ranch (2018–present); Jackson's MMA Acoma (2018–present)
- Trainer: Greg Jackson; Nick Urso; Clint Roberts
- Rank: Brown belt in Brazilian Jiu-Jitsu
- Wrestling: NCAA Division I Wrestling
- Years active: 2012–present

Mixed martial arts record
- Total: 22
- Wins: 12
- By knockout: 4
- By submission: 5
- By decision: 3
- Losses: 8
- By knockout: 1
- By submission: 2
- By decision: 5
- Draws: 2

Other information
- Mixed martial arts record from Sherdog

Landon Anthony Vannata (born March 14, 1992) is an American professional mixed martial artist who competed in the featherweight division of the Ultimate Fighting Championship. A professional competitor since 2012, he has formerly competed for the RFA and Pancrase.

== Early years ==
Vannata was born in Neptune, New Jersey and at the age of 13, began wrestling and Brazilian Jiu-Jitsu. Vannata later wrestled at an NCAA Division I University of Tennessee at Chattanooga, but dropped out after one semester. After dropping out, he left for Albuquerque, New Mexico, to join JacksonWink Academy

== Mixed martial arts career ==
=== Early career ===
Vannata made his professional MMA debut in May 2012. He amassed an undefeated record of 8–0 in various promotions over the next four years before joining the UFC.

=== Ultimate Fighting Championship ===
After an injury to Michael Chiesa, Vannata was called on two weeks' notice to fight against ranked #3 lightweight Tony Ferguson on July 16, 2016, at UFC Fight Night 91. After an exciting back-and-forth fight, and almost finishing Ferguson with strikes in the first round he lost by submission in the second round. Both participants were awarded a Fight of the Night bonus.

Vannata faced John Makdessi on December 10, 2016, at UFC 206 He won the fight via highlight reel spinning heel kick knockout in the first round and was awarded a Performance of the Night bonus.

Vannata faced David Teymur on March 4, 2017, at UFC 209. He lost the fight via unanimous decision. The fight was awarded Fight of the Night honors.

Vannata was expected to face Abel Trujillo on October 7, 2017, at UFC 216. However, Trujillo was removed from the card on August 14 for undisclosed reasons and replaced by Bobby Green. Vannata struck Green with a knee while Green was a grounded opponent, which caused referee Herb Dean to deduct one point from Vannata. The judges handed down a split draw after three rounds with score of 29-27-27-29 and 28-28. This fight earned him Fight of the Night award.

Vannata was linked to a fight with Gilbert Burns on April 14, 2018, at UFC on Fox 29. However, the pairing never materialized as Vannata was unable to accept the fight for this date/event as he was still rehabilitating a recent arm injury.

Vannata faced Drakkar Klose on July 7, 2018, at UFC 226. He lost the fight by unanimous decision. After the fight with Klose, Vannata departed from Jackson Wink MMA Academy in the heels of Donald Cerrone's departure. Due to the departure, Vannata begun training at both Cerrone's BMF Ranch and Jackson's MMA Association Gym.

Vannata faced Matt Frevola on November 3, 2018, at UFC 230. The bout ended in a majority draw. Shortly after the fight, Vannata announced that he became a free agent. In the beginning of 2019, Vannata announced that he had signed a new, four-fight contract with the UFC.

Vannata faced promotional newcomer Marcos Rosa Mariano on February 10, 2019, at UFC 234. He won the fight via a submission in round one.

Vannata faced Marc Diakiese on September 28, 2019, at UFC Fight Night 160. He lost the fight via unanimous decision.

Vannata faced Yancy Medeiros on February 15, 2020, at UFC Fight Night 167. He won the fight via unanimous decision.

A rematch with Bobby Green took place on August 1, 2020, at UFC Fight Night 173. He lost the fight via unanimous decision. This fight earned him the Fight of the Night award.

Vannata moved down to featherweight and faced Mike Grundy at UFC 262 on May 15, 2021. He won his 145 lb debut via split decision.

Vannata was scheduled to face Tucker Lutz on November 13, 2021, at UFC Fight Night 197. However, the contest was cancelled in late October as Lutz was removed from the event in favor of another bout.

Vannata faced Charles Jourdain on April 23, 2022, at UFC Fight Night 205. He lost the fight via a guillotine choke in round one.

Vannata was scheduled to face Andre Fili on September 17, 2022, at UFC Fight Night 210. However, Vannata was forced to pull from the event due to injury.

Vannata faced Daniel Zellhuber on April 15, 2023, at UFC on ESPN 44. He lost the fight via unanimous decision.

Vannata was scheduled to face Mike Breeden on August 12, 2023, at UFC on ESPN 51. However, Vannata pulled out in early August and was replaced by Terrance McKinney.

Vannata was scheduled to face James Llontop on April 27, 2024, at UFC on ESPN 55. However, Vannata pulled out for unknown reasons, was replaced by Gabriel Green and subsequently replaced by Chris Padilla.

After a three-year absence, Vannata faced Darrius Flowers on April 4, 2026 at UFC Fight Night 272. At the weigh-ins, Flowers weighed in at 156.6 pounds, half a pound over the lightweight non-title fight limit, so the bout proceeded at catchweight with Flowers forfeiting 20 percent of his purse which went to Vannata. He lost the fight by technical knockout in the second round.

On May 29, 2026, it was reported that Vannata was removed from the UFC roster.

== Personal life ==
Vannata has said that his mother is Jewish. During a July 2026 visit to Jerusalem, he put on tefillin for the first time at the Western Wall.

== Championships and accomplishments ==
=== Mixed martial arts ===
- Ultimate Fighting Championship
  - Fight of the Night (Four times) vs. Tony Ferguson, David Teymur and Bobby Green (x2)
  - Performance of the Night (One time) vs. John Makdessi
  - UFC.com Awards
    - 2016: Knockout of the Year vs. John Makdessi & Ranked #3 Newcomer of the Year
    - 2017: Ranked #7 Fight of the Year vs. David Teymur
- Bloody Elbow
  - 2016 Newcomer of the Year
  - 2016 Knockout of the Year vs. John Makdessi at UFC 206
- MMA Junkie
  - 2016 #2 Ranked Knockout of the Year vs. John Makdessi at UFC 206
  - 2020 August Fight of the Month vs. Bobby Green at UFC Fight Night: Brunson vs. Shahbazyan
- MMADNA.nl
  - 2016 Knockout of the Year vs. John Makdessi at UFC 206
- Combat Press
  - 2016 Knockout of the Year vs. John Makdessi at UFC 206

== Mixed martial arts record ==
Professional record breakdown
22 matches	12 wins	8 losses
By knockout	4	1
By submission	5	2
By decision	3	5
Draws	2	

Res.	Record	Opponent	Method	Event	Date	Round	Time	Location	Notes
Loss	12–8–2	Darrius Flowers	TKO (slam and punches)	UFC Fight Night: Moicano vs. Duncan	April 4, 2026	2	0:52	Las Vegas, Nevada, United States	Catchweight (156.5 lb) bout; Flowers missed weight.
Loss	12–7–2	Daniel Zellhuber	Decision (unanimous)	UFC on ESPN: Holloway vs. Allen	April 15, 2023	3	5:00	Kansas City, Missouri, United States	Return to Lightweight.
Loss	12–6–2	Charles Jourdain	Submission (guillotine choke)	UFC Fight Night: Lemos vs. Andrade	April 23, 2022	1	2:32	Las Vegas, Nevada, United States	
Win	12–5–2	Mike Grundy	Decision (split)	UFC 262	May 15, 2021	3	5:00	Houston, Texas, United States	Featherweight debut.
Loss	11–5–2	Bobby Green	Decision (unanimous)	UFC Fight Night: Brunson vs. Shahbazyan	August 1, 2020	3	5:00	Las Vegas, Nevada, United States	Fight of the Night.
Win	11–4–2	Yancy Medeiros	Decision (unanimous)	UFC Fight Night: Anderson vs. Błachowicz 2	February 15, 2020	3	5:00	Rio Rancho, New Mexico, United States	
Loss	10–4–2	Marc Diakiese	Decision (unanimous)	UFC Fight Night: Hermansson vs. Cannonier	September 28, 2019	3	5:00	Copenhagen, Denmark	
Win	10–3–2	Marcos Rosa Mariano	Submission (kimura)	UFC 234	February 10, 2019	1	4:55	Melbourne, Australia	
Draw	9–3–2	Matt Frevola	Draw (majority)	UFC 230	November 3, 2018	3	5:00	New York City, New York, United States	
Loss	9–3–1	Drakkar Klose	Decision (unanimous)	UFC 226	July 7, 2018	3	5:00	Las Vegas, Nevada, United States	
Draw	9–2–1	Bobby Green	Draw (split)	UFC 216	October 7, 2017	3	5:00	Las Vegas, Nevada, United States	Vannata was deducted one point in round 1 due to an illegal knee. Fight of the Night.
Loss	9–2	David Teymur	Decision (unanimous)	UFC 209	March 4, 2017	3	5:00	Las Vegas, Nevada, United States	Fight of the Night.
Win	9–1	John Makdessi	KO (spinning wheel kick)	UFC 206	December 10, 2016	1	1:40	Toronto, Ontario, Canada	Performance of the Night. Knockout of the Year.
Loss	8–1	Tony Ferguson	Submission (brabo choke)	UFC Fight Night: McDonald vs. Lineker	July 13, 2016	2	2:22	Sioux Falls, South Dakota, United States	Fight of the Night.
Win	8–0	Ramico Blackmon	TKO (punches)	Rocky Mountain Rubicon 2	April 30, 2016	1	2:06	Pueblo, Colorado, United States	Won the TSE Lightweight Championship.
Win	7–0	Chad Curry	TKO (punches and elbows)	RFA 32	November 6, 2015	1	1:29	Prior Lake, Minnesota, United States	
Win	6–0	Santana-Sol Martinez	Submission (arm-triangle choke)	High Altitude Face Off 7	December 6, 2014	1	1:11	Alamosa, Colorado, United States	
Win	5–0	Bruce Reis	Submission (heel hook)	Jackson's MMA Series 13	August 22, 2014	2	1:07	Pueblo, Colorado, United States	
Win	4–0	Mitsuyoshi Nakai	Submission (rear-naked choke)	Pancrase 255	December 8, 2013	1	4:13	Tokyo, Japan	Welterweight bout.
Win	3–0	J. P. Reese	Decision (split)	Xtreme FC 25	September 6, 2013	3	5:00	Albuquerque, New Mexico, United States	
Win	2–0	Antonio Ramirez	Submission (rear-naked choke)	Kamikaze Fight League 2	May 29, 2013	1	2:11	Puerto Vallarta, Mexico	
Win	1–0	Adrian Apodaca	TKO (punches)	Mescalero Warrior Challenge 2	May 12, 2012	1	2:38	Mescalero, New Mexico, United States	

== Kickboxing record ==
Muay Thai record
1 Wins, 0 Losses, 0 Draw
Date	Result	Opponent	Event	Location	Method	Round	Time
2026-07-27	Win	(Israel) Natan Levy	Gordon Fight Nights 1	Tel Aviv, Israel	Decision (split)	3	3:00
Legend: Win Loss Draw/No contest Notes
