= Daniel Teymur =

Swedish kickboxer and mixed martial artist

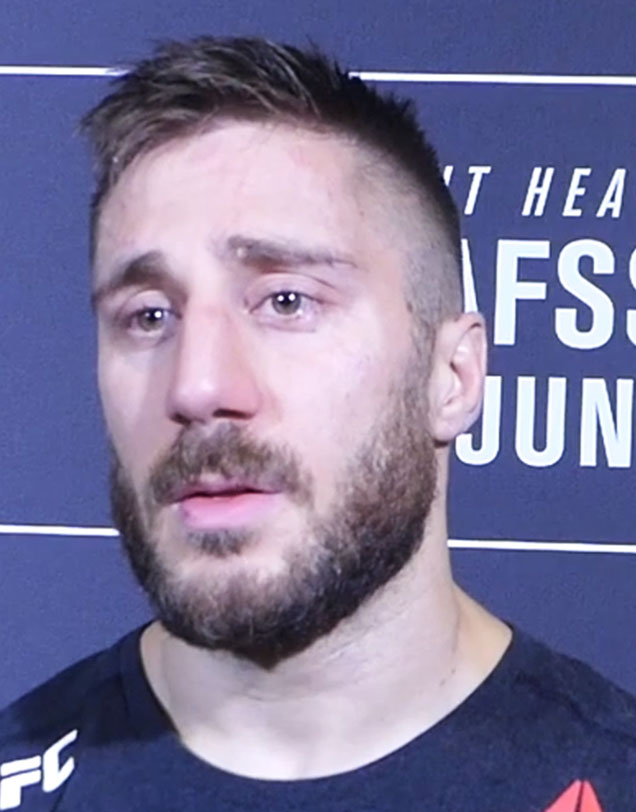
- Daniel Teymur at UFC Fight Night 153 in Stockholm, Sweden
- Born: February 3, 1988 (age 38); Järfälla, Sweden
- Nickname: Kid Dynamite
- Height: 5 ft 5 in (165 cm)
- Weight: 145 lb (66 kg; 10.4 st)
- Division: Featherweight; Lightweight
- Fighting out of: Stockholm, Sweden
- Team: Allstars Training Center; Stockholm Kickboxing Team
- Years active: 2013–present (MMA); 2008–2013 (kickboxing)

Kickboxing record
- Total: 31
- Wins: 27
- By knockout: 11
- Losses: 4

Mixed martial arts record
- Total: 11
- Wins: 7
- By knockout: 3
- By submission: 3
- By decision: 1
- Losses: 4
- By knockout: 1
- By submission: 2
- By decision: 1

Other information
- Notable relatives: David Teymur, brother
- Mixed martial arts record from Sherdog

Daniel Teymur (born February 3, 1988) is a Swedish professional mixed martial artist in the lightweight division. He was the Nordic champion in Thai boxing and he competed in the Ultimate Fighting Championship (UFC).

== Background ==
Teymur and his younger brother David Teymur, started training Muay Thai when he was a teenager. Both of the Teymur brothers grew up watching their older brother, Gabriel Teymur, competing in kickboxing and boxing. Teymur competed in Muay Thai and kickboxing with a record of 27–4 prior to transitioning to MMA. He won Swedish national championship three times in Muay Thai and once in kickboxing and the Muay Thai Nordic championship one time.

== Mixed martial arts career ==
=== Early career ===
Teymur fought his first six fights on the European circuit, racking up a record of 6–0, all in first round finishes (3 by KO/TKO, 3 by submission). His last fight, prior joining UFC, was at Battle of Botnia in 2016, facing Manolo Scianna, and he won the technical knockout in the first round.

=== Ultimate Fighting Championship ===
In his promotional debut, Teymur faced Danny Henry at UFC Fight Night 113 on July 16, 2017. He lost the bout by unanimous decision. Despite the loss, Teymur was awarded a Fight of the Night bonus award.

Teymur faced Julio Arce on June 1, 2018, at UFC Fight Night 131. He lost the fight via rear naked choke submission in the third round.

Next he fought Chris Fishgold on February 23, 2019, at UFC Fight Night 145. He lost the fight via submission in the second round.

Teymur faced Sung Bin Jo on June 1, 2019, at UFC Fight Night 153. He won the fight by unanimous decision.

Teymur faced newcomer Chase Hooper on December 14, 2019, at UFC 245. He lost the fight via TKO in the first round.

As of February 2020, Teymur is listed as a former fighter on the UFC website.

== Personal life ==
Teymur's younger brother, David Teymur, is also a MMA fighter and currently signed with the UFC. Both brothers transitioned to MMA from kickboxing and Muay Thai in 2012, making their debuts in 2013. A few years later both got into the UFC. David was signed in 2015 and Daniel in 2017. He is of Aramean descent.

== Championships and accomplishments ==
- Ultimate Fighting Championship
  - Fight of the Night (One time) vs. Danny Henry

=== Kickboxing and Muay Thai ===
- Regional championships
  - 2008 Swedish National Muay Thai Championship (gold) (-60 kg)
  - 2008 Nordic Muay Thai Championship (gold) (-60 kg)
  - 2009 Swedish National Muay Thai Championship (gold) (-63,5 kg)
  - 2010 Swedish National Muay Thai Championship (gold) (-63,5 kg)
  - 2012 Swedish National Kickboxing Championship (gold) (-67 kg)

== Mixed martial arts record ==
Professional record breakdown
11 matches	7 wins	4 losses
By knockout	3	1
By submission	3	2
By decision	1	1

Res.	Record	Opponent	Method	Event	Date	Round	Time	Location	Notes
Loss	7–4	Chase Hooper	TKO (elbow and punches)	UFC 245	December 14, 2019	1	4:34	Las Vegas, Nevada, United States	
Win	7–3	Sung Bin Jo	Decision (unanimous)	UFC Fight Night: Gustafsson vs. Smith	June 1, 2019	3	5:00	Stockholm, Sweden	
Loss	6–3	Chris Fishgold	Submission (rear-naked choke)	UFC Fight Night: Błachowicz vs. Santos	February 23, 2019	2	1:10	Prague, Czech Republic	
Loss	6–2	Julio Arce	Submission (rear-naked choke)	UFC Fight Night: Rivera vs. Moraes	June 1, 2018	3	2:55	Utica, New York, United States	Featherweight debut.
Loss	6–1	Danny Henry	Decision (unanimous)	UFC Fight Night: Nelson vs. Ponzinibbio	July 16, 2017	3	5:00	Glasgow, Scotland	Fight of the Night.
Win	6–0	Manolo Scianna	TKO (punches)	Battle of Botnia 2016	December 10, 2016	1	1:06	Umeå, Sweden	Catchweight (150 lbs) bout.
Win	5–0	Davor Matic	Submission (armbar)	Scandinavian Fight Nights 1	June 4, 2016	1	N/A	Stockholm, Sweden	
Win	4–0	Emerik Youmbi	Submission (guillotine choke)	Lions FC 6	September 12, 2015	1	3:27	Neuchâtel, Switzerland	Lightweight debut.
Win	3–0	Svyatoslav Shabanov	Submission (armbar)	International Ring Fight Arena 7	November 22, 2014	1	2:37	Solna, Sweden	Catchweight (150 lbs) bout.
Win	2–0	Alexander Denic	TKO (punches)	International Ring Fight Arena 6	April 5, 2014	1	1:01	Solna, Sweden	Catchweight (150 lbs) bout.
Win	1–0	Piotr Pączek	TKO (leg kicks and punches)	International Ring Fight Arena 5	October 19, 2013	1	1:32	Solna, Sweden	Catchweight (148 lbs) bout.

== See also ==
- List of current UFC fighters
- List of male mixed martial artists
