= UFC Fight Night: Rivera vs. Moraes =

UFC mixed martial arts event in 2018

- The poster for UFC Fight Night: Rivera vs. Moraes
- Promotion: Ultimate Fighting Championship
- Date: June 1, 2018
- Venue: Adirondack Bank Center
- City: Utica, New York
- Attendance: 5,063
- Total gate: $322,825

Event chronology
UFC Fight Night: Thompson vs. Till	UFC Fight Night: Rivera vs. Moraes	UFC 225: Whittaker vs. Romero 2

UFC Fight Night: Rivera vs. Moraes (also known as UFC Fight Night 131) was a mixed martial arts event produced by the Ultimate Fighting Championship that was held on June 1, 2018, at Adirondack Bank Center in Utica, New York.

== Background ==
The event marked the promotion's first visit to Utica.

A bantamweight bout between Jimmie Rivera and former WSOF Bantamweight Champion Marlon Moraes served as the event headliner.

Bryan Barberena was expected to face Jake Ellenberger at the event. However, on March 23, Barberena pulled out due to injury. He was replaced by Ben Saunders.

A lightweight bout between The Ultimate Fighter: Brazil 2 welterweight winner Leonardo Santos and Nik Lentz was expected to take place at this event. However, on April 28, it was reported that Santos was pulled from the event due to a hand injury. He was replaced by David Teymur

Niko Price was expected to face Belal Muhammad at the event. However, Price was removed from the bout on May 22 for undisclosed reasons and replaced by promotional newcomer Chance Rencountre.

Hector Sandoval was expected to face Jarred Brooks at the event. However, Sandoval was removed from the bout on May 22 for undisclosed reasons and replaced by promotional newcomer Jose Torres.

Former WSOF Women's Strawweight Champion Jessica Aguilar and Jodie Esquibel were scheduled to face each other in a strawweight bout. Both women successfully weighed in, but the bout was removed from the card the day of the event by the NYSAC due to a concern over a medical issue with Aguilar.

== Results ==
Main card (Fox Sports 1)
Weight class				Method	Round	Time	Notes
Bantamweight	Marlon Moraes	def.	Jimmie Rivera	KO (head kick and punches)	1	0:33
Lightweight	Gregor Gillespie	def.	Vinc Pichel	Submission (arm-triangle choke)	2	4:06
Heavyweight	Walt Harris	def.	Daniel Spitz	TKO (punches and elbows)	2	4:59
Welterweight	Ben Saunders	def.	Jake Ellenberger	TKO (knee to the body and punches)	1	1:56
Featherweight	Julio Arce	def.	Daniel Teymur	Submission (rear-naked choke)	3	2:55
Light Heavyweight	Sam Alvey	def.	Gian Villante	Decision (split) (29–28, 28–29, 29–28)	3	5:00
Preliminary card (Fox Sports 1)
Women's Flyweight	Sijara Eubanks	def.	Lauren Murphy	Decision (unanimous) (30–27, 30–27, 29–28)	3	5:00
Lightweight	David Teymur	def.	Nik Lentz	Decision (unanimous) (30–27, 30–27, 29–28)	3	5:00
Welterweight	Belal Muhammad	def.	Chance Rencountre	Decision (unanimous) (30–27, 30–27, 30–27)	3	5:00
Lightweight	Desmond Green	def.	Gleison Tibau	Decision (unanimous) (30–27, 30–27, 29–27)	3	5:00
Preliminary card (UFC Fight Pass)
Bantamweight	Nathaniel Wood	def.	Johnny Eduardo	Submission (D'Arce choke)	2	2:18
Flyweight	Jose Torres	def.	Jarred Brooks	KO (slam)	2	2:55	(Note: Brooks knocked himself out when attempting to slam Torres.)

== Bonus awards ==
The following fighters were awarded $50,000 bonuses:

- Fight of the Night: None awarded
- Performance of the Night: Marlon Moraes, Gregor Gillespie, Ben Saunders, and Nathaniel Wood

== See also ==
- List of UFC events
- 2018 in UFC
- List of current UFC fighters
- Mixed martial arts
