= UFC Fight Night: Moicano vs. Duncan =

Mixed martial arts event in 2026

- The poster for UFC Fight Night: Moicano vs. Duncan
- Promotion: Ultimate Fighting Championship
- Date: April 4, 2026
- Venue: Meta Apex
- City: Enterprise, Nevada, United States
- Attendance: Not announced

Event chronology
UFC Fight Night: Adesanya vs. Pyfer	UFC Fight Night: Moicano vs. Duncan	UFC 327: Procházka vs. Ulberg

UFC Fight Night: Moicano vs. Duncan (also known as UFC Fight Night 272 and UFC Vegas 115) was a mixed martial arts event produced by the Ultimate Fighting Championship which took place on April 4, 2026, at the Meta Apex in Enterprise, Nevada, part of the Las Vegas Valley, United States.

== Background ==
A lightweight bout between former UFC Lightweight Championship challenger Renato Moicano and Chris Duncan headlined the event.

A lightweight bout between Tofiq Musayev and Samuel Sanches was scheduled for the event. Sanches withdrew for undisclosed reasons, leading to the cancellation of the matchup. Musayev was then rebooked one week earlier at UFC Fight Night: Adesanya vs. Pyfer against Ignacio Bahamondes.

A middleweight bout between Edmen Shahbazyan and Park Jun-yong was scheduled for the event. However, Park had to withdraw due to an injury and the pairing was scrapped.

A welterweight bout between Charles Radtke and promotional newcomer José Henrique Souza was scheduled for the event. However, for undisclosed reasons, Souza withdrew and Radtke was re-booked for UFC 327 one week later with a new opponent.

At the weigh-ins, two fighters missed weight:

- Undefeated prospect Rafael Estevam weighed in at 136.5 pounds, half a pound over the bantamweight non-title fight limit.
- Darrius Flowers weighed in at 156.5 pounds, half a pound over the lightweight non-title fight limit.

Estevam and Flowers' bouts proceeded at catchweight. Both fighters were fined 20 percent of their individual purses which went to their opponents Ethyn Ewing and Lando Vannata respectively.

== Results ==
Main card (Paramount+)
Weight class				Method	Round	Time	Notes
Lightweight	Renato Moicano	def.	Chris Duncan	Submission (face crank)	2	3:14
Women's Strawweight	Virna Jandiroba	def.	Tabatha Ricci	Decision (unanimous) (30–27, 29–28, 29–28)	3	5:00
Light Heavyweight	Abdul-Rakhman Yakhyaev	def.	Brendson Ribeiro	Submission (rear-naked choke)	1	2:52
Catchweight (136.5 lb)	Ethyn Ewing	def.	Rafael Estevam	KO (punch to the body)	3	1:44
Featherweight	Tommy McMillen	def.	Manolo Zecchini	TKO (knee to the body and punches)	1	3:57
Featherweight	José Mauro Delano	def.	Robert Ruchała	Decision (unanimous) (30–26, 29–27, 29–27)	3	5:00	(Note: Ruchała was deducted one point in round 3 due to grabbing the fence.)
Preliminary card (Paramount+)
Heavyweight	Thomas Petersen	def.	Guilherme Pat	Decision (majority) (28–28, 29–27, 29–27)	3	5:00
Flyweight	Alessandro Costa	def.	Stewart Nicoll	KO (punch to the body)	2	4:56
Catchweight (156.5 lb)	Darrius Flowers	def.	Lando Vannata	TKO (slam and punches)	2	0:52
Women's Bantamweight	Alice Pereira	def.	Hailey Cowan	KO (knee)	2	4:24
Middleweight	Tresean Gore	def.	Azamat Bekoev	Technical Submission (guillotine choke)	3	3:27
Women's Flyweight	Dione Barbosa	def.	Melissa Gatto	Decision (majority) (28–28, 29–27, 29–27)	3	5:00	(Note: Barbosa was deducted one point in round 2 due to an illegal soccer kick.)
Lightweight	Kai Kamaka III	def.	Dakota Hope	Decision (split) (29–28, 29–28, 28–29)	3	5:00

== Bonus awards ==
The following fighters received $100,000 bonuses. The other finishes received $25,000 additional bonuses, with the exception of Darrius Flowers, as he missed weight for his bout.

- Fight of the Night: Tommy McMillen vs. Manolo Zecchini
- Performance of the Night: Alessandro Costa and Alice Pereira

== See also ==
- 2026 in UFC
- List of current UFC fighters
- List of UFC events
