= UFC 280 =

Mixed martial arts event in 2022

UFC 280: Oliveira vs. Makhachev
- The poster for UFC 280: Oliveira vs. Makhachev
- Promotion: Ultimate Fighting Championship
- Date: October 22, 2022
- Venue: Etihad Arena
- City: Abu Dhabi, United Arab Emirates
- Attendance: 13,400
- Total gate: Not Announced
- Buyrate: 650,000

Event chronology
UFC Fight Night: Grasso vs. Araújo	UFC 280: Oliveira vs. Makhachev	UFC Fight Night: Kattar vs. Allen

UFC 280: Oliveira vs. Makhachev was a mixed martial arts event produced by the Ultimate Fighting Championship that took place on October 22, 2022, at the Etihad Arena in Abu Dhabi, United Arab Emirates.

== Background ==
A UFC Lightweight Championship bout for the vacant title between former champion Charles Oliveira and Islam Makhachev headlined the event. Oliveira was stripped of the title at UFC 274 when he failed to make weight for his attempted title defense against former interim champion (also former WSOF Lightweight Champion) Justin Gaethje. Beneil Dariush, who is scheduled to face former KSW Featherweight and Lightweight Champion Mateusz Gamrot, revealed in mid-September that he was expected to serve as backup to this contest. In turn, current UFC Featherweight Champion Alexander Volkanovski announced in mid-October that he was the official replacement in case either of the headliners pull out. Dariush still claimed that he had the backup spot, but no official announcement had been made by the promotion. Volkanovski eventually weighed in successfully as the official substitute.

A UFC Bantamweight Championship bout between current champion Aljamain Sterling and former two-time champion T.J. Dillashaw was originally targeted as the main event of UFC 279, but the promotion opted to change plans and move it to this event.

Former UFC Women's Flyweight Championship challenger Katlyn Chookagian and Manon Fiorot met in a women's flyweight bout at this event. They were originally scheduled to meet at UFC Fight Night: Gane vs. Tuivasa a month earlier, with Chookagian pulling out once due to undisclosed reasons, only to return as a replacement for her own substitute. At the weigh-ins, Chookagian weighed in at 127.5 pounds, one and a half pounds over the flyweight non-title fight limit. The bout proceeded at catchweight and she was fined 20% of her purse, which went to Fiorot.

A women's strawweight bout between Marina Rodriguez and Amanda Lemos was expected to take place at the event. However, the bout was postponed to UFC Fight Night 214 for unknown reasons.

A heavyweight bout between Parker Porter and Hamdy Abdelwahab was scheduled for the event. However, Abdelwahab was removed for unknown reasons and replaced by promotional newcomer Slim Trabelsi. In turn, the pairing was cancelled altogether as Trabelsi pulled out due to contractual issues with ARES FC and Porter opted to pursue a later fight, rather than a replacement barring unforeseen circumstances.

Jamie Mullarkey was expected to face Magomed Mustafaev in a lightweight bout. However, Mullarkey pulled out in mid-September due to injury. He was replaced by Yamato Nishikawa. In turn, Nishikawa was forced to withdraw due to contractual issues and the bout was scrapped.

A heavyweight bout between Shamil Abdurakhimov and Jailton Almeida was expected to take place at this event. They were originally scheduled to meet at UFC 279, but Abdurakhimov withdrew due to visa issues. In turn, Almeida was booked against Maxim Grishin at UFC Fight Night 214 in a catchweight of 220 pounds, after Abdurakhimov withdrew again for unknown reasons.

A featherweight bout between Zubaira Tukhugov and Lucas Almeida was expected to take place at this event. However, the bout was scrapped the day before the event due to weight management issues related to Tukhugov.

== Results ==
Main card
Weight class				Method	Round	Time	Notes
Lightweight	Islam Makhachev	def.	Charles Oliveira	Submission (arm-triangle choke)	2	3:16	(Note: For the vacant UFC Lightweight Championship.)
Bantamweight	Aljamain Sterling (c)	def.	T.J. Dillashaw	TKO (punches)	2	3:44	(Note: For the UFC Bantamweight Championship.)
Bantamweight	Sean O'Malley	def.	Petr Yan	Decision (split) (29–28, 28–29, 29–28)	3	5:00
Lightweight	Beneil Dariush	def.	Mateusz Gamrot	Decision (unanimous) (30–27, 30–27, 29-28)	3	5:00
Catchweight (127.5 lb)	Manon Fiorot	def.	Katlyn Chookagian	Decision (unanimous) (29–28, 29–28, 29–28)	3	5:00
Preliminary card (ESPNews / ESPN+)
Welterweight	Belal Muhammad	def.	Sean Brady	TKO (punches)	2	4:47
Middleweight	Caio Borralho	def.	Makhmud Muradov	Decision (unanimous) (30–27, 30–27, 29–28)	3	5:00
Light Heavyweight	Nikita Krylov	def.	Volkan Oezdemir	Decision (unanimous) (30–27, 29–28, 29–28)	3	5:00
Welterweight	Abubakar Nurmagomedov	def.	Gadzhi Omargadzhiev	Decision (unanimous) (29–28, 29–28, 30–27)	3	5:00
Middleweight	Armen Petrosyan	def.	AJ Dobson	Decision (unanimous) (30–27, 30–27, 30–27)	3	5:00
Flyweight	Muhammad Mokaev	def.	Malcolm Gordon	Submission (armbar)	3	4:26
Women's Bantamweight	Karol Rosa	def.	Lina Länsberg	Decision (majority) (29–27, 29–27, 28–28)	3	5:00	(Note: Rosa was deducted 1 point in round 2 due to an illegal knee.)

== Bonus awards ==
The following fighters received $50,000 bonuses.

- Fight of the Night: Sean O'Malley vs. Petr Yan
- Performance of the Night: Islam Makhachev and Belal Muhammad

== See also ==
- List of UFC events
- List of current UFC fighters
- 2022 in UFC
