= UFC on ESPN: Font vs. Vera =

Mixed martial arts event in 2022

- The poster for UFC on ESPN: Font vs. Vera
- Promotion: Ultimate Fighting Championship
- Date: April 30, 2022
- Venue: UFC Apex
- City: Enterprise, Nevada, United States
- Attendance: Not announced

Event chronology
UFC Fight Night: Lemos vs. Andrade	UFC on ESPN: Font vs. Vera	UFC 274: Oliveira vs. Gaethje

UFC on ESPN: Font vs. Vera (also known as UFC on ESPN 35 and UFC Vegas 53) was a mixed martial arts event produced by the Ultimate Fighting Championship that took place on April 30, 2022, at the UFC Apex facility in Enterprise, Nevada, part of the Las Vegas Metropolitan Area, United States.

== Background ==
A bantamweight bout between Rob Font and Marlon Vera headlined the event. At the weigh-ins, Font weighed in at 138.5 pounds, two and half pounds over the division non-title fight limit. The bout proceeded at a catchweight with Font forfeiting 20% of his purse to Vera.

A women's strawweight bout between former Invicta FC Atomweight Champion and UFC Women's Strawweight Championship challenger Jessica Penne and Luana Pinheiro was expected to take place at UFC Fight Night: Vieira vs. Tate in last November, but Penne withdrew from the bout due to undisclosed reasons. The pairing was rebooked for this event. They were once again scrapped as Pinheiro pulled out due to an undisclosed injury.

A lightweight bout between Joe Lauzon and former UFC Lightweight Championship challenger Donald Cerrone was scheduled for the event. However, the bout was moved to UFC 274 on May 7 due to undisclosed reasons.

A lightweight bout between Jared Gordon and Rafael Alves was scheduled for the event. However, Alves withdrew from the event due to undisclosed reasons and was replaced by Grant Dawson.

Justin Tafa and Jake Collier were expected to meet in a heavyweight bout at the event. However, Tafa withdrew from event due to undisclosed reasons was replaced by former UFC Heavyweight Champion Andrei Arlovski.

A women's flyweight bout between Antonina Shevchenko and Cortney Casey was expected to take place at this event. However, the bout was postponed to UFC Fight Night 209 in July due to Shevchenko injuring her knee in training.

A heavyweight bout between Alexander Romanov and Chase Sherman was expected to take place one week prior at UFC Fight Night: Lemos vs. Andrade. However, the bout was pushed back to this event after Sherman was deemed unable to compete due to a minor health issue.

A flyweight bout between Tatsuro Taira and Carlos Candelario was expected to take place at the event. However, just hours before the event the bout was scratched due to Candelario suffering from an illness and was rescheduled to UFC on ESPN: Błachowicz vs. Rakić.

== Results ==
Main card (ESPN / ESPN+)
Weight class				Method	Round	Time	Notes
Catchweight (138.5 lb)	Marlon Vera	def.	Rob Font	Decision (unanimous) (48–47, 49–46, 49–46)	5	5:00
Heavyweight	Andrei Arlovski	def.	Jake Collier	Decision (split) (27–30, 29–28, 29–28)	3	5:00
Featherweight	Joanderson Brito	def.	Andre Fili	TKO (punches)	1	0:41
Lightweight	Grant Dawson	def.	Jared Gordon	Submission (rear-naked choke)	3	4:11
Featherweight	Darren Elkins	def.	Tristan Connelly	Decision (unanimous) (30–27, 30–27, 30–27)	3	5:00
Middleweight	Krzysztof Jotko	def.	Gerald Meerschaert	Decision (unanimous) (30–27, 30–27, 30–27)	3	5:00
Preliminary card (ESPN2 / ESPN+)
Heavyweight	Alexander Romanov	def.	Chase Sherman	Submission (americana)	1	2:11
Flyweight	Francisco Figueiredo	def.	Daniel Lacerda	Submission (kneebar)	1	1:18
Welterweight	Gabriel Green	def.	Yohan Lainesse	TKO (punches)	2	4:02
Lightweight	Natan Levy	def.	Mike Breeden	Decision (unanimous) (29–28, 29–28, 30–27)	3	5:00
Women's Flyweight	Shanna Young	def.	Gina Mazany	TKO (punches)	2	3:11

== Bonus awards ==
The following fighters received $50,000 bonuses.

- Fight of the Night: Marlon Vera vs. Rob Font^{1}
- Performance of the Night: Joanderson Brito and Francisco Figueiredo

1. Font was disqualified for the Fight of the Night bonus due to missing weight. As a result, his share of the award was given to Vera.

== See also ==
- List of UFC events
- List of current UFC fighters
- 2022 in UFC
