= UFC on ESPN: Błachowicz vs. Rakić =

2022 mixed martial arts event

- The poster for UFC on ESPN: Błachowicz vs. Rakić
- Promotion: Ultimate Fighting Championship
- Date: May 14, 2022
- Venue: UFC Apex
- City: Enterprise, Nevada, United States
- Attendance: Not announced

Event chronology
UFC 274: Oliveira vs. Gaethje	UFC on ESPN: Błachowicz vs. Rakić	UFC Fight Night: Holm vs. Vieira

UFC on ESPN: Błachowicz vs. Rakić (also known as UFC on ESPN 36 and UFC Vegas 54) was a mixed martial arts event produced by the Ultimate Fighting Championship that took place on May 14, 2022, at the UFC Apex facility in Enterprise, Nevada, part of the Las Vegas Metropolitan Area, United States.

== Background ==
A light heavyweight bout between former KSW and UFC Light Heavyweight Champion Jan Błachowicz and Aleksandar Rakić served as the event headliner. They were previously scheduled to headline UFC on ESPN: Blaydes vs. Daukaus, but Błachowicz withdrew due to an injury and the bout was cancelled.

A women's flyweight bout between former Strikeforce and UFC Women's Bantamweight Champion Miesha Tate and former Invicta FC Bantamweight Champion (also former UFC Women's Flyweight Championship challenger) Lauren Murphy was expected to take place at this event. However, the bout was moved to UFC 276 for unknown reasons.

Ryan Spann and Ion Cuțelaba met in a light heavyweight bout at the event. The pair was previously scheduled to fight at UFC Fight Night: Makhachev vs. Green, but Spann was pulled due to injury.

A flyweight bout between Jake Hadley and Allan Nascimento took place at the event. The pair was previously scheduled to meet at UFC Fight Night: Volkov vs. Aspinall, but the bout was cancelled due to Hadley's injury.

Louis Smolka and Davey Grant were expected to meet in a bantamweight bout at UFC on ESPN: Ngannou vs. Rozenstruik in March 2020, but the event was cancelled due to the COVID-19 pandemic. They eventually met at this event.

A lightweight bout between Michael Johnson and Alan Patrick was originally scheduled to take place one week prior at UFC 274, but it was pushed back to this event for unknown reasons.

Daniel Pineda and Jamall Emmers were expected to meet in a featherweight bout. However, the bout was scrapped in late April for unknown reasons.

A flyweight bout between Tatsuro Taira and Carlos Candelario was expected to take place two weeks earlier at UFC on ESPN: Font vs. Vera. However, it was scratched just hours before taking place due to Candelario suffering from an illness. They were then rescheduled for this event.

== Results ==
Main card (ESPN2 / ESPN+)
Weight class				Method	Round	Time	Notes
Light Heavyweight	Jan Błachowicz	def.	Aleksandar Rakić	TKO (knee injury)	3	1:11
Light Heavyweight	Ryan Spann	def.	Ion Cuțelaba	Submission (guillotine choke)	1	2:22
Bantamweight	Davey Grant	def.	Louis Smolka	KO (punches)	3	0:49
Women's Flyweight	Katlyn Chookagian	def.	Amanda Ribas	Decision (split) (28–29, 29–28, 29–28)	3	5:00
Lightweight	Manuel Torres	def.	Frank Camacho	TKO (punches)	1	3:27
Flyweight	Allan Nascimento	def.	Jake Hadley	Decision (unanimous) (30–27, 30–27, 30–27)	3	5:00
Preliminary card (ESPN / ESPN+)
Women's Flyweight	Viviane Araújo	def.	Andrea Lee	Decision (unanimous) (29–28, 29–27, 29–27)	3	5:00
Lightweight	Michael Johnson	def.	Alan Patrick	KO (punches)	2	3:22
Women's Strawweight	Virna Jandiroba	def.	Angela Hill	Decision (unanimous) (30–27, 30–27, 30–27)	3	5:00
Flyweight	Tatsuro Taira	def.	Carlos Candelario	Decision (unanimous) (30–26, 30–27, 30–27)	3	5:00
Middleweight	Andre Petroski	def.	Nick Maximov	Technical Submission (anaconda choke)	1	1:16

== Bonus awards ==
The following fighters received $50,000 bonuses.

- Fight of the Night: Katlyn Chookagian vs. Amanda Ribas
- Performance of the Night: Ryan Spann and Manuel Torres

== See also ==
- List of UFC events
- List of current UFC fighters
- 2022 in UFC
