= 2022 in UFC =

Mixed martial arts events

Information
- First date: January 15, 2022
- Last date: December 17, 2022

Events
- Total events: 42
- UFC: 13
- TUF Finale events: 1

Fights
- Total fights: 511
- Title fights: 19

Chronology
2021 in UFC	2022 in UFC	2023 in UFC

The year 2022 was the 30th year in the history of the Ultimate Fighting Championship (UFC), a mixed martial arts promotion based in the United States.

Despite the relaxation of COVID-19 pandemic restrictions, the promotion's UFC Apex continued hosting events with reduced crowds, with 21 events held.

== 2022 by the numbers ==
The numbers below records the events, fights, techniques, champions and fighters held or performed for the year of 2022 in UFC.

Events
Number of Events	PPV	Continents	Countries	Cities	Fight Night Bonuses
42	13	3	5	16	199; Total $9,950,000
Longest Event	Shortest Event	Highest Income Live Gate	Lowest Income Live Gate	Highest Attendance	Lowest Attendance
UFC 271 2:57:22	UFC on ESPN: Santos vs. Hill 1:10:04	UFC 281 $11,562,807.77	UFC 275 $1,546,732	UFC 281 20,845	UFC 275 (exclud. APEX events); 10,787
Title Fights
Undisputed Title Fights	Title Changes	Champions Remained in Their Divisions	Number of Champions	Number of Interim Champions	Number of Title Defenses
18	9	5 BW – Aljamain Sterling; FW – Alexander Volkanovski; HW – Francis Ngannou; WFYW – Valentina Shevchenko; WFW –Amanda Nunes	13	1	8
Champions
Division	Beginning of The Year	End of The Year	Division	Beginning of The Year	End of The Year
Heavyweight	Francis Ngannou	Francis Ngannou	Bantamweight	Aljamain Sterling	Aljamain Sterling
Light Heavyweight	Glover Teixeira	Vacant	Flyweight	Brandon Moreno	Deiveson Figueiredo
Middleweight	Israel Adesanya	Alex Pereira	Women's Bantamweight	Julianna Peña	Amanda Nunes
Welterweight	Kamaru Usman	Leon Edwards	Women's Flyweight	Valentina Shevchenko	Valentina Shevchenko
Lightweight	Charles Oliveira	Islam Makhachev	Women's Strawweight	Zhang Weili	Mackenzie Dern
Featherweight	Alexander Volkanovski	Alexander Volkanovski	Women's Featherweight	Amanda Nunes	Amanda Nunes
Fights
Most Knockouts at A Single Event	Most submissions at A Single Event	Most Decisions at A Single Event	Total Number of Fights	Total Number of Cage Time	
UFC on ESPN: Kattar vs. Emmett 8	UFC Fight Night: Rodriguez vs. Lemos; UFC Fight Night: Volkov vs. Aspinall 5	UFC 274 10	511	92:30:16	
Fighters
Number of Fighters	UFC Debutants	Releases / Retired	Fighters Suspended	Number of Fighters Missed weight	
(At the end of Dec 31, 2022); 583	99	125	18	30	
Champion feats
Deiveson Figueiredo became the first two-time UFC Flyweight champion.; Jiří Procházka became the first Czech-born UFC champion.; Leon Edwards became the first Jamaican-born UFC champion.
Fighter feats
Katlyn Chookagian became the first fighter in UFC history to win their first 10 bouts by decision.; Claudio Puelles became the first fighter to have three victories by kneebar submission.; Jéssica Andrade became the first fighter to win by a standing arm-triangle choke submission with her victory at UFC Fight Night 205.; Rob Font's 271 significant strikes set the record for the most in a bantamweight bout.; Zhang Weili's spinning back‑fist victory was the first by a woman in UFC history.; Muhammad Mokaev's 12 takedowns at UFC Fight Night 208 were the most in a flyweight bout.; Cory McKenna became the first female to win by a Von Flue choke submission with her victory at UFC on ESPN 40.; Khamzat Chimaev's victory at UFC 279 marked his fourth bout without absorbing a significant strike, the most in UFC history.; Rafael dos Anjos became the first fighter in UFC history to record over 8 hours of total fight time.; Raul Rosas Jr., at 18 years old, became the youngest fighter to score a victory with his UFC 282 win.

== 2022 UFC Honors awards ==
Starting in 2019, the UFC created year-end awards with "UFC Honors President's Choice Awards" for categories "Performance of the Year" and "Fight of the Year" being chosen by UFC CEO Dana White. The other "UFC Honors Fan Choice Awards" are for categories "Knockout of the Year", "Submission of the Year", "Event of the Year", "Comeback of the Year" and, from 2020, "Debut of the Year" in which fans are able to vote for the winner on social media.

Winners receive a trophy commemorating their achievement along with a set of tires from sponsor Toyo Tires.

2022 UFC Honors Awards
	Performance of the Year	Fight of the Year	Knockout of the Year	Submission of the Year	Debut of the Year	Event of the Year	Comeback of the Year
Winner	Zhang Weili defeats Joanna Jędrzejczyk 2 UFC 275	Khamzat Chimaev defeats Gilbert Burns; UFC 273	Leon Edwards defeats Kamaru Usman 2 UFC 278	Islam Makhachev defeats Charles Oliveira; UFC 280	Abusupiyan Magomedov defeats Dustin Stoltzfus; UFC Fight Night: Gane vs. Tuivasa	UFC 281: Adesanya vs. Pereira	Leon Edwards defeats Kamaru Usman 2 UFC 278
Nominee	Jéssica Andrade defeats Amanda Lemos; UFC Fight Night: Lemos vs. Andrade	Dustin Poirier defeats Michael Chandler; UFC 281	Michael Chandler defeats Tony Ferguson; UFC 274	Jéssica Andrade defeats Amanda Lemos; UFC Fight Night: Lemos vs. Andrade	Muhammad Mokaev defeats Cody Durden; UFC Fight Night: Volkov vs. Aspinall	UFC Fight Night: Volkov vs. Aspinall	Gregory Rodrigues defeats Chidi Njokuani; UFC Fight Night: Sandhagen vs. Song
Nominee	Michael Chandler defeats Tony Ferguson; UFC 274	Matt Schnell defeats Su Mudaerji; UFC on ABC: Ortega vs. Rodríguez	Zhang Weili defeats Joanna Jędrzejczyk 2 UFC 275	Jiří Procházka defeats Glover Teixeira; UFC 275	Joe Pyfer defeats Alen Amedovski; UFC Fight Night: Sandhagen vs. Song	UFC on ESPN: Santos vs. Hill	Matt Schnell defeats Su Mudaerji; UFC on ABC: Ortega vs. Rodríguez
Nominee	Molly McCann defeats Luana Carolina; UFC Fight Night: Volkov vs. Aspinall	Jiří Procházka defeats Glover Teixeira; UFC 275	Molly McCann defeats Luana Carolina; UFC Fight Night: Volkov vs. Aspinall	Zhang Weili defeats Carla Esparza; UFC 281	Yazmin Jauregui defeats Iasmin Lucindo; UFC on ESPN: Vera vs. Cruz	UFC Fight Night: Gane vs. Tuivasa	Alex Pereira defeats Israel Adesanya 1 UFC 281
Nominee	Marlon Vera defeats Rob Font; UFC on ESPN: Font vs. Vera	—N/a	—N/a	—N/a	—N/a	—N/a	—N/a
Ref							

== 2022 UFC.com awards ==
2022 UFC.COM Awards
No	The Fighters	The Upsets	The Submissions	The Newcomers	The Knockouts	The Fights
1	Alexander Volkanovski	Leon Edwards defeats Kamaru Usman 2 UFC 278	Jéssica Andrade defeats Amanda Lemos; UFC Fight Night: Lemos vs. Andrade	Jack Della Maddalena	Leon Edwards defeats Kamaru Usman 2 UFC 278	Jiří Procházka defeats Glover Teixeira; UFC 275
2	Alex Pereira	Carla Esparza defeats Rose Namajunas 2 UFC 274	Jiří Procházka defeats Glover Teixeira; UFC 275	Jailton Almeida	Michael Chandler defeats Tony Ferguson; UFC 274	Khamzat Chimaev defeats Gilbert Burns; UFC 273
3	Islam Makhachev	Sean O'Malley defeats Petr Yan; UFC 280	Tom Aspinall defeats Alexander Volkov; UFC Fight Night: Volkov vs. Aspinall	Muhammad Mokaev	Molly McCann defeats Luana Carolina; UFC Fight Night: Volkov vs. Aspinall	Dustin Poirier defeats Michael Chandler; UFC 281
4	Zhang Weili	Kai Kara-France defeats Askar Askarov; UFC on ESPN: Blaydes vs. Daukaus	Islam Makhachev defeats Charles Oliveira; UFC 280	Tatsuro Taira	Zhang Weili defeats Joanna Jędrzejczyk 2 UFC 275	Stephen Thompson defeats Kevin Holland; UFC on ESPN: Thompson vs. Holland
5	Leon Edwards	Victor Henry defeats Raoni Barcelos; UFC 270	Claudio Puelles defeats Clay Guida; UFC Fight Night: Lemos vs. Andrade	Yazmin Jauregui	Marlon Vera defeats Dominick Cruz; UFC on ESPN: Vera vs. Cruz	Matt Schnell defeats Su Mudaerji; UFC on ABC: Ortega vs. Rodríguez
6	Marlon Vera	Alex Pereira defeats Israel Adesanya 1 UFC 281	Paul Craig defeats Nikita Krylov; UFC Fight Night: Volkov vs. Aspinall	Chidi Njokuani	Alex Pereira defeats Sean Strickland; UFC 276	Deiveson Figueiredo defeats Brandon Moreno 3 UFC 270
7	Aljamain Sterling	Aljamain Sterling defeats Petr Yan 2 UFC 273	Matt Schnell defeats Su Mudaerji; UFC on ABC: Ortega vs. Rodríguez	Natália Silva	Ilia Topuria defeats Jai Herbert; UFC 290	Ciryl Gane defeats Tai Tuivasa; UFC Fight Night: Gane vs. Tuivasa
8	Jamahal Hill	Tai Tuivasa defeats Derrick Lewis; UFC 271	Charles Oliveira defeats Justin Gaethje; UFC 274	Michael Morales	Chris Gutiérrez defeats Frankie Edgar; UFC 281	Calvin Kattar defeats Giga Chikadze; UFC on ESPN: Kattar vs. Chikadze
9	Jiří Procházka	Roman Dolidze defeats Jack Hermansson; UFC on ESPN: Thompson vs. Holland	Ilia Topuria defeats Bryce Mitchell; UFC Fight Night: Volkov vs. Aspinall	Raul Rosas Jr.	Adrian Yañez defeats Tony Kelley; UFC on ESPN: Kattar vs. Emmett	Mateusz Gamrot defeats Arman Tsarukyan 1 UFC on ESPN: Tsarukyan vs. Gamrot
10	Roman Dolidze	Marcin Tybura defeats Alexandr Romanov; UFC 278	Said Nurmagomedov defeats Cody Stamann; UFC 270	André Fialho	Hayisaer Maheshate defeats Steve Garcia; UFC 275	Sean O'Malley defeats Petr Yan; UFC 280
Ref						

== Releases and retirements ==
These fighters have either been released from their UFC contracts, announced their retirement or joined other promotions:

Month	Day	ISO	Fighter	Division	Reason	Ref
January	12	(United States)	Jared Gooden	Welterweight	Released	
January	12	(United States)	Maki Pitolo	Middleweight	Released	
January	12	(United States)	Matt Sayles	Lightweight	Released	
January	27	(United States)	Jeremy Stephens	Lightweight	Contract not renewed	
January	27	(England)	Tom Breese	Middleweight	Signed with Levels Fight League	
February	8	(United States)	Mallory Martin	Women's Strawweight	Contract not renewed	
February	9	(Brazil)	Dhiego Lima	Welterweight	Retired	
February	10	(United States)	Andre Ewell	Featherweight	Released	
February	10	(United States)	Collin Anglin	Featherweight	Released	
February	10	(United States)	Dakota Bush	Lightweight	Released	
February	10	(United States)	Domingo Pilarte	Bantamweight	Released	
February	10	(Belgium)	Gaetano Pirrello	Bantamweight	Released	
February	10	(United States)	Gustavo Lopez	Bantamweight	Released	
February	10	(China)	Hu Yaozong	Middleweight	Released	
February	10	(United States)	Jordan Williams	Welterweight	Released	
February	10	(United States)	Sasha Palatnikov	Welterweight	Released	
February	10	(United States)	Sean Soriano	Featherweight	Released	
February	13	(United States)	Roxanne Modafferi	Women's Flyweight	Retired	
February	17	(United States)	Jennifer Gonzalez	Women's Flyweight	Released	
February	20	(United States)	Chas Skelly	Featherweight	Retired	
February	23	(Brazil)	Danilo Marques	Light Heavyweight	Released	
February	23	(Canada)	Alexis Davis	Women's Bantamweight	Contract not renewed	
March	1	(United States)	Fabio Cherant	Light Heavyweight	Released	
March	1	(United States)	Hunter Azure	Bantamweight	Released	
March	1	(Georgia (country))	Zviad Lazishvili	Bantamweight	Released	
March	8	(Brazil)	Carlos Felipe	Heavyweight	Released	
March	12	(United States)	Greg Hardy	Heavyweight	Released	
March	15	(Brazil)	Davi Ramos	Lightweight	Released	
March	16	(Colombia)	Sabina Mazo	Women's Flyweight	Released	
April	11	(Brazil)	Alex Oliveira	Welterweight	Contract not renewed	
April	13	(United States)	Kay Hansen	Women's Strawweight	Released	
April	13	(Brazil)	Marlon Moraes	Bantamweight	Retired	
April	31	(United States)	Ben Rothwell	Heavyweight	Released	
May	4	(United States)	Dean Barry	Welterweight	Released	
May	4	(United States)	Gina Mazany	Women's Flyweight	Released	
May	5	(United States)	Austin Hubbard	Lightweight	Released	
May	5	(United States)	Brandon Jenkins	Lightweight	Released	
May	5	(Brazil)	Bruno Souza	Featherweight	Released	
May	5	(England)	Cameron Else	Bantamweight	Released	
May	5	(United States)	Devonte Smith	Lightweight	Released	
May	5	(United States)	Jesse Strader	Bantamweight	Released	
May	5	(Mexico)	Kazula Vargas	Lightweight	Released	
May	5	(United States)	Kevin Croom	Bantamweight	Released	
May	5	(United States)	Kris Moutinho	Bantamweight	Released	
May	5	(Brazil)	Luigi Vendramini	Lightweight	Released	
May	5	(Philippines)	Mark Striegl	Featherweight	Released	
May	5	(United States)	Micheal Gillmore	Welterweight	Released	
May	5	(England)	Mike Grundy	Featherweight	Released	
May	5	(China)	Rong Zhu	Lightweight	Released	
May	6	(United States)	Ike Villanueva	Light Heavyweight	Released	
May	15	(United States)	Gregor Gillespie	Lightweight	Released	
June	4	(United States)	Felice Herrig	Women's Strawweight	Retired	
June	8	(Brazil)	Alex da Silva Coelho	Lightweight	Released	
June	8	(Greece)	Andreas Michailidis	Welterweight	Released	
June	8	(United States)	Frank Camacho	Lightweight	Released	
June	8	(United States)	Louis Smolka	Bantamweight	Released	
June	9	(Brazil)	Felipe Colares	Bantamweight	Released	
June	9	(Canada)	T.J. Laramie	Featherweight	Released	
June	9	(Germany)	Niklas Stolze	Lightweight	Released	
June	9	(Canada)	Tristan Connelly	Lightweight	Released	
June	12	(Poland)	Joanna Jędrzejczyk	Women's Strawweight	Retired	
June	12	(Russia)	Zabit Magomedsharipov	Featherweight	Retired	
June	16	(Ukraine)	Askar Mozharov	Light Heavyweight	Released	
June	16	(Brazil)	Poliana Botelho	Women's Flyweight	Released	
June	23	(Brazil)	Gloria de Paula	Women's Strawweight	Released	
June	23	(Brazil)	Rogério Bontorin	Flyweight	Released	
June	23	(Russia)	Timur Valiev	Bantamweight	Did not re-sign	
June	24	(United States)	Hannah Cifers	Women's Strawweight	Released	
June	24	(Uzbekistan)	Zarrukh Adashev	Flyweight	Released	
July	2	(United States)	Donald Cerrone	Welterweight	Retired	
July	2	(United States)	Jessica Eye	Women's Flyweight	Retired	
July	7	(United States)	Tony Kelley	Bantamweight	Released	
July	12	(Scotland)	Joanne Wood	Women's Flyweight	Released	
July	19	(France)	Alan Baudot	Heavyweight	Released	
July	19	(United States)	Dwight Grant	Welterweight	Released	
July	19	(United States)	Karl Roberson	Light Heavyweight	Released	
August	9	(Brazil)	Alan Patrick	Lightweight	Released	
August	9	(United States)	Danny Chavez	Featherweight	Released	
August	9	(Russia)	Ramazan Emeev	Welterweight	Released	
August	10	(United States)	Sam Alvey	Middleweight	Released	
August	13	(United States)	Nina Nunes	Women's Flyweight	Retired	
August	15	(United States)	Shane Burgos	Featherweight	Signed with PFL	
August	16	(United States)	Miranda Granger	Women's Strawweight	Released	
August	21	(United States)	Luke Rockhold	Middleweight	Retired	
August	25	(Brazil)	Francisco Figueiredo	Flyweight	Released	
August	25	(Morocco)	Youssef Zalal	Bantamweight	Released	
August	31	(Brazil)	Cláudio Silva	Welterweight	Released	
August	31	(United States)	Harry Hunsucker	Light Heavyweight	Released	
August	31	(China)	Wu Yanan	Women's Bantamweight	Released	
August	31	(United States)	Uriah Hall	Middleweight	Retired	
September	6	(Italy)	Alessio Di Chirico	Middleweight	Retired	
September	8	(Brazil)	Thiago Santos	Light Heavyweight	Signed with PFL	
September	11	(United States)	Nate Diaz	Welterweight	Contract completed	
September	15	(Wales)	Mason Jones	Lightweight	Released	
September	15	(United States)	Mickey Gall	Welterweight	Released	
September	21	(United States)	Sara McMann	Women's Bantamweight	Released	
October	4	(Russia)	Shamil Gamzatov	Light Heavyweight	Released	
October	10	(Russia)	Aleksei Oleinik	Heavyweight	Released	
October	20	(United States)	Randy Costa	Bantamweight	Released	
October	30	(Russia)	Askar Askarov	Flyweight	Released	
October	30	(Poland)	Krzysztof Jotko	Middleweight	Released	
October	31	(United States)	Cameron Vancamp	Lightweight	Released	
October	31	(United States)	Charlie Ontiveros	Lightweight	Released	
October	31	(United States)	Darian Weeks	Welterweight	Released	
October	31	(Canada)	Jesse Ronson	Lightweight	Released	
October	31	(United States)	Louis Cosce	Welterweight	Released	
October	31	(Russia)	Magomed Mustafaev	Lightweight	Released	
October	31	(Latvia)	Misha Cirkunov	Light Heavyweight	Released	
October	31	(United States)	Nick Maximov	Middleweight	Released	
October	31	(Russia)	Sergey Khandozhko	Welterweight	Retired	
November	12	(United States)	Frankie Edgar	Bantamweight	Retired	
November	14	(New Zealand)	Brad Riddell	Lightweight	Retired	
November	16	(Argentina)	Silvana Gómez Juárez	Women's Strawweight	Released	
November	16	(United States)	Shanna Young	Women's Bantamweight	Released	
November	30	(United States)	Jason Witt	Welterweight	Retired	
December	15	(Democratic Republic of the Congo)	Dalcha Lungiambula	Middleweight	Released	
December	15	(United States)	Benito Lopez	Bantamweight	Released	
December	22	(United States)	Deron Winn	Middleweight	Released	
December	27	(United States)	Jared Vanderaa	Heavyweight	Released	

== Debut UFC fighters ==
The following fighters fought their first UFC fight in 2022:

Month	Day	ISO	Fighter	Division	Event	Ref
January	15	(Brazil)	Joanderson Brito	Featherweight	UFC on ESPN 32	
January	15	(United States)	Joseph Holmes	Middleweight	UFC on ESPN 32	
January	22	(Portugal)	André Fialho	Welterweight	UFC 270	
January	22	(Mexico)	Genaro Valdéz	Lightweight	UFC 270	
January	22	(Australia)	Jack Della Maddalena	Welterweight	UFC 270	
January	22	(Canada)	Jasmine Jasudavicius	Women's Flyweight	UFC 270	
January	22	(Ecuador)	Michael Morales	Welterweight	UFC 270	
January	22	(United States)	Pete Rodriguez	Welterweight	UFC 270	
January	22	(Brazil)	Saimon Oliveira	Bantamweight	UFC 270	
January	22	(United States)	Victor Henry	Bantamweight	UFC 270	
January	22	(Russia)	Viacheslav Borshchev	Lightweight	UFC 270	
February	5	(United States)	Chidi Njokuani	Middleweight	UFC Fight Night 200	
February	5	(Ukraine)	Denys Bondar	Flyweight	UFC Fight Night 200	
February	5	(Brazil)	Jailton Almeida	Heavyweight	UFC Fight Night 200	
February	5	(United States)	Tresean Gore	Middleweight	UFC Fight Night 200	
February	12	(United States)	AJ Dobson	Middleweight	UFC 271	
February	12	(Zimbabwe)	Mike Mathetha	Welterweight	UFC 271	
February	19	(Canada)	Chad Anheliger	Bantamweight	UFC Fight Night 201	
February	19	(United States)	Christian Rodriguez	Bantamweight	UFC Fight Night 201	
February	19	(United States)	Jay Perrin	Bantamweight	UFC Fight Night 201	
February	19	(Brazil)	Nikolas Motta	Lightweight	UFC Fight Night 201	
February	26	(Armenia)	Armen Petrosyan	Middleweight	UFC Fight Night 202	
February	26	(United States)	Carlos Hernandez	Flyweight	UFC Fight Night 202	
February	26	(Hong Kong)	Ramona Pascual	Women's Featherweight	UFC Fight Night 202	
February	26	(United States)	Victor Altamirano	Flyweight	UFC Fight Night 202	
March	12	(United States)	A.J. Fletcher	Welterweight	UFC Fight Night 203	
March	12	(Russia)	Azamat Murzakanov	Light Heavyweight	UFC Fight Night 203	
March	12	(Afghanistan)	Javid Basharat	Bantamweight	UFC Fight Night 203	
March	19	(England)	Muhammad Mokaev	Flyweight	UFC Fight Night 204	
March	26	(Russia)	Aliaskhab Khizriev	Middleweight	UFC on ESPN 33	
April	9	(Brazil)	Daniel Santos	Bantamweight	UFC 273	
April	9	(United States)	Josh Fremd	Middleweight	UFC 273	
April	9	(Canada)	Mike Malott	Welterweight	UFC 273	
April	9	(Venezuela)	Piera Rodríguez	Women's Strawweight	UFC 273	
April	16	(Democratic Republic of the Congo)	Ange Loosa	Welterweight	UFC on ESPN 34	
April	16	(Brazil)	Caio Borralho	Middleweight	UFC on ESPN 34	
April	16	(Russia)	Gadzhi Omargadzhiev	Middleweight	UFC on ESPN 34	
April	16	(Slovakia)	Martin Buday	Heavyweight	UFC on ESPN 34	
April	16	(United States)	Trey Ogden	Lightweight	UFC on ESPN 34	
April	23	(Republic of Ireland)	Dean Barry	Welterweight	UFC Fight Night 205	
April	23	(United States)	Evan Elder	Lightweight	UFC Fight Night 205	
May	7	(United States)	Cameron VanCamp	Welterweight	UFC 274	
May	7	(United States)	C.J. Vergara	Flyweight	UFC 274	
May	7	(United States)	Fernie Garcia	Bantamweight	UFC 274	
May	7	(Brazil)	Kleydson Rodrigues	Flyweight	UFC 274	
May	14	(United States)	Carlos Candelario	Flyweight	UFC on ESPN 36	
May	14	(England)	Jake Hadley	Flyweight	UFC on ESPN 36	
May	14	(Mexico)	Manuel Torres	Lightweight	UFC on ESPN 36	
May	14	(Japan)	Tatsuro Taira	Flyweight	UFC on ESPN 36	
June	4	(Ukraine)	Askar Mozharov	Light Heavyweight	UFC Fight Night 207	
June	4	(United States)	Daniel Argueta	Featherweight	UFC Fight Night 207	
June	4	(Brazil)	Karine Silva	Women's Flyweight	UFC Fight Night 207	
June	4	(Russia)	Rinat Fakhretdinov	Welterweight	UFC Fight Night 207	
June	12	(China)	Hayisaer Maheshate	Lightweight	UFC 275	
June	18	(Brazil)	Maria Oliveira	Women's Strawweight	UFC on ESPN 37	
June	18	(Brazil)	Natália Silva	Women's Flyweight	UFC on ESPN 37	
July	6	(United States)	Emily Ducote	Women's Strawweight	UFC on ABC 3	
July	23	(United States)	Charles Johnson	Flyweight	UFC Fight Night 208	
July	30	(Ukraine)	Ihor Potieria	Light Heavyweight	UFC 277	
August	6	(United States)	Brogan Walker	Women's Flyweight	UFC on ESPN 40	
August	6	(United States)	Juliana Miller	Women's Flyweight	UFC on ESPN 40	
August	6	(Nigeria)	Mohammed Usman	Heavyweight	UFC on ESPN 40	
September	3	(Russia)	Abusupiyan Magomedov	Middleweight	UFC Fight Night 209	
September	17	(Brazil)	Denise Gomes	Women's Strawweight	UFC Fight Night 210	
September	17	(United States)	Joe Pyfer	Middleweight	UFC Fight Night 210	
October	15	(Brazil)	Lucas Alexander	Featherweight	UFC Fight Night 212	
October	29	(Brazil)	Carlos Mota	Flyweight	UFC Fight Night 213	
October	29	(United States)	Joshua Weems	Bantamweight	UFC Fight Night 213	
November	5	(Brazil)	Tamires Vidal	Women's Bantamweight	UFC Fight Night 214	
November	19	(Czech Republic)	Tereza Bledá	Women's Flyweight	UFC Fight Night 215	
December	3	(United States)	Francis Marshall	Featherweight	UFC on ESPN 42	
December	10	(South Africa)	Cameron Saaiman	Bantamweight	UFC 282	
December	10	(Venezuela)	Erik Silva	Featherweight	UFC 282	
December	10	(United States)	Raul Rosas Jr.	Bantamweight	UFC 282	
December	10	(United States)	Steven Koslow	Bantamweight	UFC 282	
December	17	(Brazil)	Alessandro Costa	Flyweight	UFC Fight Night 216	

== Suspended fighters ==
The list below is based on fighters suspended either by (1) United States Anti-Doping Agency (USADA) or World Anti-Doping Agency (WADA) for violation of taking prohibited substances or non-analytical incidents, (2) by local commissions on misconduct during the fights or at event venues, or (3) by the UFC for reasons also stated below.

ISO	Name	Nickname	Division	From	Duration	Tested positive for / Info	By	Eligible to fight again	Ref.	Notes
Canada	Jesse Ronson	The Body Snatcher	Welterweight	Jul 22, 2020	20 months	Metandienone	USADA	Mar 22, 2022		
Mexico	Jorge Gonzalez	George St.	Light Heavyweight	Aug 5, 2020	2 years	Stanozolol metabolites, drostanolone metabolite and tamoxifen metabolite.	USADA	Aug 5, 2022		
Poland	Oskar Piechota	Imadło	Middleweight	Sep 25, 2020	22 months	Growth hormone releasing peptide 2 (GHRP-2 or pralmorelin) and GHRP-2 (1-3) free acid, a metabolite of GHRP-2,	USADA	Jul 25, 2022		
Uzbekistan	Liliya Shakirova		Women's Flyweight	Dec 5, 2020	2 years	Meldonium	USADA	Dec 5, 2022		
Brazil	Geraldo de Freitas	Spartan	Bantamweight	Jan 11, 2021	2 years	Exogenous administration of testosterone and/or its precursors	USADA	Jan 11, 2023		
Brazil	Raphael Pessoa	Bebezão	Heavyweight	Feb 9, 2021	2 years	7-Keto-DHEA and AOD-9064 Hydrochlorothiazide (HCTZ) and its metabolites Chlorothiazide and 4-amino-6-chloro-1,3-benzenedisulfonamide (ACB)	USADA	Feb 9, 2023		Second USADA violation. Results collected from out-of-competition on February 9, 2021, February 15, 2021, February 16, 2021, and March 4, 2021. Ressoa also evaded sample collection on January 25, 2021, and January 28, 2021.
United States	Daniel Pineda	The Pit	Featherweight	June 26, 2021	9 months	Amphetamine	NSAC	Mar 26, 2022		
United States	Ryan Benoit	Baby Face	Flyweight	July 31, 2021	9 months	Modafinil	NSAC	April 1, 2022		
United States	Kevin Lee	The Motown Phenom	Welterweight	Aug 28, 2021	6 months	Adderall	NSAC	Feb 28, 2022		$19,526 Fine
United States	Josh Quinlan	The Maverick	Welterweight	Sep 7, 2021	9 months	Drostanolone	NSAC	June 7, 2022		
Poland	Łukasz Brzeski	The Bull	Heavyweight	Sep 14, 2021	9 months	Clomiphene	NSAC	June 14, 2022		$750 Fine
Brazil	Carlos Felipe	Boi	Heavyweight	Oct 16, 2021	18 months	Boldenone and its metabolites	NSAC	Apr 16, 2023		$4,200 fine and $489 in prosecution fees
Georgia	Zviad Lazishvili		Bantamweight	Oct 23, 2021	9 months	Clomiphene	NSAC	July 24, 2022		$1,800 fine and $326 in prosecution fees
United States	Miles Johns	Chapo	Bantamweight	Feb 5, 2022	6 months	Adderall	USADA	Aug 5, 2022		$3,450 fine
United States	Ashlee Evans-Smith	Rebel Girl	Women's Bantamweight	Jan 3, 2022	14 months	dehydroepiandrosterone	USADA	March 3, 2023		
Brazil	Elizeu Zaleski dos Santos	Capoeira	Welterweight	March 14, 2022	1 year	Ostarine	USADA	March 14, 2023		
United States	Bobby Green	King	Lightweight	May 16, 2022	6 months	Dehydroepiandrosterone (DHEA)	USADA	November 16, 2022		
United States	Jeff Molina	El Jefe	Flyweight	Nov 5, 2022	1 year	linked to the investigation that began as a result of suspicious betting activity ahead of the Nov. 5 UFC fight between Darrick Minner	NSAC	N/A		

== The Ultimate Fighter ==
The following The Ultimate Fighter seasons are scheduled for broadcast in 2022:

Season	Division	Winner	Runner-up	Ref
The Ultimate Fighter 30	Heavyweight	Mohammed Usman	Zac Pauga	
The Ultimate Fighter 30	Women's Flyweight	Juliana Miller	Brogan Walker-Sanchez	

== Title fights ==
Title fights in 2022
Weight class				Method	Round	Time	Event	Notes
Flyweight	Deiveson Figueiredo	def.	Brandon Moreno (c)	Decision (unanimous) (48–47, 48–47, 48–47)	5	5:00	UFC 270	(Note: For the UFC Flyweight Championship.)
Heavyweight	Francis Ngannou (c)	def.	Ciryl Gane (ic)	Decision (unanimous) (48–47, 48–47, 49–46)	5	5:00	UFC 270	(Note: For the UFC Heavyweight Championship.)
Middleweight	Israel Adesanya (c)	def.	Robert Whittaker	Decision (unanimous) (48–47, 48–47, 49–46)	5	5:00	UFC 271	(Note: For the UFC Middleweight Championship.)
Bantamweight	Aljamain Sterling (c)	def.	Petr Yan (ic)	Decision (split) (48–47, 47–48, 48–47)	5	5:00	UFC 273	(Note: For the UFC Bantamweight Championship.)
Featherweight	Alexander Volkanovski (c)	def.	Chan Sung Jung	TKO (punches)	4	0:45	UFC 273	(Note: For the UFC Featherweight Championship.)
Women's Strawweight	Carla Esparza	def.	Rose Namajunas (c)	Decision (split) (47–48, 49–46, 48–47)	5	5:00	UFC 274	(Note: For the UFC Women's Strawweight Championship.)
Lightweight	Charles Oliveira	def.	Justin Gaethje	Submission (rear-naked choke)	1	3:22	UFC 274	(Note: For the vacant UFC Lightweight Championship. (Oliveira missed weight, only Gaethje was eligible).)
Women's Flyweight	Valentina Shevchenko (c)	def.	Taila Santos	Decision (split) (48–47, 47–48, 49–46)	5	5:00	UFC 275	(Note: For the UFC Women's Flyweight Championship.)
Light Heavyweight	Jiří Procházka	def.	Glover Teixeira (c)	Submission (rear-naked choke)	5	4:32	UFC 275	(Note: For the UFC Light Heavyweight Championship.)
Featherweight	Alexander Volkanovski (c)	def.	Max Holloway	Decision (unanimous) (50–45, 50–45, 50–45)	5	5:00	UFC 276	(Note: For the UFC Featherweight Championship.)
Middleweight	Israel Adesanya (c)	def.	Jared Cannonier	Decision (unanimous) (49–46, 49–46, 50–45)	5	5:00	UFC 276	(Note: For the UFC Middleweight Championship.)
Flyweight	Brandon Moreno	def.	Kai Kara-France	TKO (body kick and punches)	3	4:34	UFC 277	(Note: For the interim UFC Flyweight Championship.)
Women's Bantamweight	Amanda Nunes	def.	Julianna Peña (c)	Decision (unanimous) (50–45, 50–44, 50–43)	5	5:00	UFC 277	(Note: For the UFC Women's Bantamweight Championship.)
Welterweight	Leon Edwards	def.	Kamaru Usman (c)	KO (head kick)	5	4:04	UFC 278	(Note: For the UFC Welterweight Championship.)
Bantamweight	Aljamain Sterling (c)	def.	T.J. Dillashaw	TKO (punches)	2	3:44	UFC 280	(Note: For the UFC Bantamweight Championship.)
Lightweight	Islam Makhachev	def.	Charles Oliveira	Submission (arm-triangle choke)	2	3:16	UFC 280	(Note: For the vacant UFC Lightweight Championship.)
Women's Strawweight	Zhang Weili	def.	Carla Esparza (c)	Submission (rear-naked choke)	2	1:05	UFC 281	(Note: For the UFC Women's Strawweight Championship.)
Middleweight	Alex Pereira	def.	Israel Adesanya (c)	TKO (punches)	5	2:01	UFC 281	(Note: For the UFC Middleweight Championship.)
Light Heavyweight	Jan Błachowicz	vs.	Magomed Ankalaev	Draw (split) (48–47, 46–48, 47–47)	5	5:00	UFC 282	(Note: For the vacant UFC Light Heavyweight Championship.)

== Events list ==
#	Event	Date	Venue	City	Country	Atten.	Ref.	Fight of the Night			Performance of the Night		Bonus	Ref.
631	UFC Fight Night: Cannonier vs. Strickland	Dec 17, 2022	UFC Apex	Las Vegas, Nevada	United States	—N/a		Drew Dober	vs.	Bobby Green	Alex Caceres	Michał Oleksiejczuk	$50,000	
630	UFC 282: Błachowicz vs. Ankalaev	Dec 10, 2022	T-Mobile Arena	Las Vegas, Nevada	United States	18,455		Darren Till	vs.	Dricus du Plessis	Santiago Ponzinibbio	Ilia Topuria	$50,000	
630	UFC 282: Błachowicz vs. Ankalaev	Dec 10, 2022	T-Mobile Arena	Las Vegas, Nevada	United States	18,455		Darren Till	vs.	Dricus du Plessis	Raul Rosas Jr.	Jairzinho Rozenstruik	$50,000	
630	UFC 282: Błachowicz vs. Ankalaev	Dec 10, 2022	T-Mobile Arena	Las Vegas, Nevada	United States	18,455		Darren Till	vs.	Dricus du Plessis	Edmen Shahbazyan	Chris Curtis	$50,000	
630	UFC 282: Błachowicz vs. Ankalaev	Dec 10, 2022	T-Mobile Arena	Las Vegas, Nevada	United States	18,455		Darren Till	vs.	Dricus du Plessis	Billy Quarantillo	T.J. Brown	$50,000	
630	UFC 282: Błachowicz vs. Ankalaev	Dec 10, 2022	T-Mobile Arena	Las Vegas, Nevada	United States	18,455		Darren Till	vs.	Dricus du Plessis	Cameron Saaiman	—N/a	$50,000	
629	UFC on ESPN: Thompson vs. Holland	Dec 3, 2022	Amway Center	Orlando, Florida	United States	17,065		Stephen Thompson	vs.	Kevin Holland	Sergei Pavlovich	Roman Dolidze	$50,000	
628	UFC Fight Night: Nzechukwu vs. Cuțelaba	Nov 19, 2022	UFC Apex	Las Vegas, Nevada	United States	—N/a		—N/a			Kennedy Nzechukwu	Muslim Salikhov	$50,000	
628	UFC Fight Night: Nzechukwu vs. Cuțelaba	Nov 19, 2022	UFC Apex	Las Vegas, Nevada	United States	—N/a		—N/a			Jack Della Maddalena	Natália Silva	$50,000	
627	UFC 281: Adesanya vs. Pereira	Nov 12, 2022	Madison Square Garden	New York City, New York	United States	20,845		Dustin Poirier	vs.	Michael Chandler	Alex Pereira	Zhang Weili	$50,000	
626	UFC Fight Night: Rodriguez vs. Lemos	Nov 5, 2022	UFC Apex	Las Vegas, Nevada	United States	—N/a		—N/a			Neil Magny	Mario Bautista	$50,000	
626	UFC Fight Night: Rodriguez vs. Lemos	Nov 5, 2022	UFC Apex	Las Vegas, Nevada	United States	—N/a		—N/a			Polyana Viana	Tamires Vidal	$50,000	
625	UFC Fight Night: Kattar vs. Allen	Oct 29, 2022	UFC Apex	Las Vegas, Nevada	United States	—N/a		—N/a			Tresean Gore	Roman Dolidze	$50,000	
625	UFC Fight Night: Kattar vs. Allen	Oct 29, 2022	UFC Apex	Las Vegas, Nevada	United States	—N/a		—N/a			Steve Garcia	Christian Rodriguez	$50,000	
624	UFC 280: Oliveira vs. Makhachev	Oct 22, 2022	Etihad Arena	Abu Dhabi	United Arab Emirates	13,400		Petr Yan	vs.	Sean O'Malley	Islam Makhachev	Belal Muhammad	$50,000	
623	UFC Fight Night: Grasso vs. Araújo	Oct 15, 2022	UFC Apex	Las Vegas, Nevada	United States	—N/a		Duško Todorović	vs.	Jordan Wright	Jonathan Martinez	Tatsuro Taira	$50,000	
622	UFC Fight Night: Dern vs. Yan	Oct 1, 2022	UFC Apex	Las Vegas, Nevada	United States	—N/a		John Castañeda	vs.	Daniel Santos	Joaquim Silva	Brendan Allen	$50,000	
622	UFC Fight Night: Dern vs. Yan	Oct 1, 2022	UFC Apex	Las Vegas, Nevada	United States	—N/a		John Castañeda	vs.	Daniel Santos	Chelsea Chandler	Guido Cannetti	$50,000	
621	UFC Fight Night: Sandhagen vs. Song	Sep 17, 2022	UFC Apex	Las Vegas, Nevada	United States	—N/a		Gregory Rodrigues	vs.	Chidi Njokuani	Damon Jackson	Joseph Pyfer	$50,000	
620	UFC 279: Diaz vs. Ferguson	Sep 10, 2022	T-Mobile Arena	Las Vegas, Nevada	United States	19,125		—N/a			Nate Diaz	Irene Aldana	$50,000	
620	UFC 279: Diaz vs. Ferguson	Sep 10, 2022	T-Mobile Arena	Las Vegas, Nevada	United States	19,125		—N/a			Johnny Walker	Jailton Almeida	$50,000	
619	UFC Fight Night: Gane vs. Tuivasa	Sep 3, 2022	Accor Arena	Paris	France	15,405		Ciryl Gane	vs.	Tai Tuivasa	Abus Magomedov	Benoît Saint-Denis	$50,000	
618	UFC 278: Usman vs. Edwards 2	Aug 20, 2022	Vivint Arena	Salt Lake City, Utah	United States	18,321		Paulo Costa	vs.	Luke Rockhold	Leon Edwards	Victor Altamirano	$50,000	
617	UFC on ESPN: Vera vs Cruz	Aug 13, 2022	Pechanga Arena	San Diego, California	United States	12,804		Nate Landwehr	vs.	David Onama	Marlon Vera	Tyson Nam	$50,000	
616	UFC on ESPN: Santos vs. Hill	Aug 6, 2022	UFC Apex	Las Vegas, Nevada	United States	—N/a		Thiago Santos	vs.	Jamahal Hill	Geoff Neal	Mohammed Usman	$50,000	
616	UFC on ESPN: Santos vs. Hill	Aug 6, 2022	UFC Apex	Las Vegas, Nevada	United States	—N/a		Thiago Santos	vs.	Jamahal Hill	Bryan Battle	—N/a	$50,000	
615	UFC 277: Peña vs. Nunes 2	Jul 30, 2022	American Airlines Center	Dallas, Texas	United States	19,442		Brandon Moreno	vs.	Kai Kara-France	Alexandre Pantoja	Drew Dober	$50,000	
614	UFC Fight Night: Blaydes vs. Aspinall	Jul 23, 2022	The O_{2} Arena	London	England	17,813		—N/a			Paddy Pimblett	Nikita Krylov	$50,000	
614	UFC Fight Night: Blaydes vs. Aspinall	Jul 23, 2022	The O_{2} Arena	London	England	17,813		—N/a			Molly McCann	Jonathan Pearce	$50,000	
613	UFC on ABC: Ortega vs. Rodríguez	Jul 16, 2022	UBS Arena	Elmont, New York	United States	16,979		Matt Schnell	vs.	Su Mudaerji	Li Jingliang	Dustin Jacoby	$50,000	
613	UFC on ABC: Ortega vs. Rodríguez	Jul 16, 2022	UBS Arena	Elmont, New York	United States	16,979		Matt Schnell	vs.	Su Mudaerji	Ricky Simón	Amanda Lemos	$50,000	
613	UFC on ABC: Ortega vs. Rodríguez	Jul 16, 2022	UBS Arena	Elmont, New York	United States	16,979		Matt Schnell	vs.	Su Mudaerji	Bill Algeo	Punahele Soriano	$50,000	
612	UFC on ESPN: dos Anjos vs. Fiziev	Jul 9, 2022	UFC Apex	Las Vegas, Nevada	United States	—N/a		Michael Johnson	vs.	Jamie Mullarkey	Rafael Fiziev	Chase Sherman	$50,000	
611	UFC 276: Adesanya vs. Cannonier	July 2, 2022	T-Mobile Arena	Las Vegas, Nevada	United States	19,649		Robbie Lawler	vs.	Bryan Barberena	Alex Pereira	Jalin Turner	$50,000	
611	UFC 276: Adesanya vs. Cannonier	July 2, 2022	T-Mobile Arena	Las Vegas, Nevada	United States	19,649		Robbie Lawler	vs.	Bryan Barberena	Julija Stoliarenko	—N/a	$50,000	
610	UFC on ESPN: Tsarukyan vs. Gamrot	Jun 25, 2022	UFC Apex	Las Vegas, Nevada	United States	—N/a		Arman Tsarukyan	vs.	Mateusz Gamrot	Shavkat Rakhmonov	Josh Parisian	$50,000	
610	UFC on ESPN: Tsarukyan vs. Gamrot	Jun 25, 2022	UFC Apex	Las Vegas, Nevada	United States	—N/a		Arman Tsarukyan	vs.	Mateusz Gamrot	Thiago Moisés	—N/a	$50,000	
609	UFC on ESPN: Kattar vs. Emmett	Jun 18, 2022	Moody Center	Austin, Texas	United States	13,689		Calvin Kattar	vs.	Josh Emmett	Kevin Holland	Joaquin Buckley	$50,000	
609	UFC on ESPN: Kattar vs. Emmett	Jun 18, 2022	Moody Center	Austin, Texas	United States	13,689		Calvin Kattar	vs.	Josh Emmett	Gregory Rodrigues	Adrian Yanez	$50,000	
609	UFC on ESPN: Kattar vs. Emmett	Jun 18, 2022	Moody Center	Austin, Texas	United States	13,689		Calvin Kattar	vs.	Josh Emmett	Jeremiah Wells	Ricardo Romos	$50,000	
609	UFC on ESPN: Kattar vs. Emmett	Jun 18, 2022	Moody Center	Austin, Texas	United States	13,689		Calvin Kattar	vs.	Josh Emmett	Cody Stamann	Phil Hawes	$50,000	
609	UFC on ESPN: Kattar vs. Emmett	Jun 18, 2022	Moody Center	Austin, Texas	United States	13,689		Calvin Kattar	vs.	Josh Emmett	Roman Dolidze	—N/a	$50,000	
608	UFC 275: Teixeira vs. Procházka	Jun 12, 2022	Singapore Indoor Stadium	Kallang	Singapore	10,787		Glover Teixeira	vs.	Jiří Procházka	Zhang Weili	Jake Matthews	$50,000	
608	UFC 275: Teixeira vs. Procházka	Jun 12, 2022	Singapore Indoor Stadium	Kallang	Singapore	10,787		Glover Teixeira	vs.	Jiří Procházka	Jack Della Maddalena	Hayisaer Maheshate	$50,000	
608	UFC 275: Teixeira vs. Procházka	Jun 12, 2022	Singapore Indoor Stadium	Kallang	Singapore	10,787		Glover Teixeira	vs.	Jiří Procházka	Silvana Gómez Juárez	—N/a	$50,000	
607	UFC Fight Night: Volkov vs. Rozenstruik	Jun 4, 2022	UFC Apex	Las Vegas, Nevada	United States	—N/a		Lucas Almeida	vs.	Michael Trizano	Karine Silva	Ode' Osbourne	$50,000	
606	UFC Fight Night: Holm vs. Vieira	May 21, 2022	UFC Apex	Las Vegas, Nevada	United States	—N/a		Michel Pereira	vs.	Santiago Ponzinibbio	Chidi Njokuani	Chase Hooper	$50,000	
605	UFC on ESPN: Błachowicz vs. Rakić	May 14, 2022	UFC Apex	Las Vegas, Nevada	United States	—N/a		Katlyn Chookagian	vs.	Amanda Ribas	Ryan Spann	Manuel Torres	$50,000	
604	UFC 274: Oliveira vs Gaethje	May 7, 2022	Footprint Center	Phoenix, Arizona	United States	17,232		Brandon Royval	vs.	Matt Schnell	Michael Chandler	André Fialho	$50,000	
603	UFC on ESPN: Font vs. Vera	Apr 30, 2022	UFC Apex	Las Vegas, Nevada	United States	—N/a		Marlon Vera	vs.	Rob Font^{2}	Joanderson Brito	Francisco Figueiredo	$50,000	
602	UFC Fight Night: Lemos vs. Andrade	Apr 23, 2022	UFC Apex	Las Vegas, Nevada	United States	—N/a		Sergey Khandozhko	vs.	Dwight Grant	Jéssica Andrade	Claudio Puelles	$50,000	
601	UFC on ESPN: Luque vs. Muhammad 2	Apr 16, 2022	UFC Apex	Las Vegas, Nevada	United States	—N/a		Mayra Bueno Silva	vs.	Wu Yanan	Drakkar Klose	André Fialho	$50,000	
600	UFC 273: Volkanovski vs. The Korean Zombie	Apr 9, 2022	VyStar Veterans Memorial Arena	Jacksonville, Florida	United States	14,605		Gilbert Burns	vs.	Khamzat Chimaev	Alexander Volkanovski	Alexey Oleynik	$50,000	
599	UFC on ESPN: Blaydes vs. Daukaus	Mar 26, 2022	Nationwide Arena	Columbus, Ohio	United States	18,630		Bryan Barberena	vs.	Matt Brown	Curtis Blaydes	Chris Gutiérrez	$50,000	
598	UFC Fight Night: Volkov vs. Aspinall	Mar 19, 2022	The O_{2} Arena	London	England	17,081		—N/a			Tom Aspinall	Arnold Allen	$50,000	
598	UFC Fight Night: Volkov vs. Aspinall	Mar 19, 2022	The O_{2} Arena	London	England	17,081		—N/a			Paddy Pimblett	Molly McCann	$50,000	
598	UFC Fight Night: Volkov vs. Aspinall	Mar 19, 2022	The O_{2} Arena	London	England	17,081		—N/a			Ilia Topuria	Makwan Amirkhani	$50,000	
598	UFC Fight Night: Volkov vs. Aspinall	Mar 19, 2022	The O_{2} Arena	London	England	17,081		—N/a			Sergei Pavlovich	Paul Craig	$50,000	
598	UFC Fight Night: Volkov vs. Aspinall	Mar 19, 2022	The O_{2} Arena	London	England	17,081		—N/a			Muhammad Mokaev	—N/a	$50,000	
597	UFC Fight Night: Santos vs. Ankalaev	Mar 12, 2022	UFC Apex	Las Vegas, Nevada	United States	—N/a		—N/a			Song Yadong	Khalil Rountree Jr.	$50,000	
597	UFC Fight Night: Santos vs. Ankalaev	Mar 12, 2022	UFC Apex	Las Vegas, Nevada	United States	—N/a		—N/a			Cody Brundage	Azamat Murzakanov	$50,000	
596	UFC 272: Covington vs. Masvidal	Mar 5, 2022	T-Mobile Arena	Las Vegas, Nevada	United States	19,425		Colby Covington	vs.	Jorge Masvidal	Kevin Holland	Maryna Moroz	$50,000	
595	UFC Fight Night: Makhachev vs. Green	Feb 26, 2022	UFC Apex	Las Vegas, Nevada	United States	—N/a		Priscila Cachoeira	vs.	Ji Yeon Kim	Wellington Turman	Arman Tsarukyan	$50,000	
594	UFC Fight Night: Walker vs. Hill	Feb 19, 2022	UFC Apex	Las Vegas, Nevada	United States	—N/a		—N/a			Jamahal Hill	Kyle Daukaus	$50,000	
594	UFC Fight Night: Walker vs. Hill	Feb 19, 2022	UFC Apex	Las Vegas, Nevada	United States	—N/a		—N/a			David Onama	Stephanie Egger	$50,000	
593	UFC 271: Adesanya vs. Whittaker 2	Feb 12, 2022	Toyota Center	Houston, Texas	United States	17,872		Douglas Silva de Andrade	vs.	Sergey Morozov	Tai Tuivasa	Jared Cannonier	$50,000	
592	UFC Fight Night: Hermansson vs. Strickland	Feb 5, 2022	UFC Apex	Las Vegas, Nevada	United States	—N/a		Julian Erosa	vs.	Steven Peterson^{1}	Shavkat Rakhmonov	Chidi Njokuani	$50,000	
591	UFC 270: Ngannou vs. Gane	Jan 22, 2022	Honda Center	Anaheim	United States	17,387		Deiveson Figueiredo	vs.	Brandon Moreno	Said Nurmagomedov	Vanessa Demopoulos	$50,000	
590	UFC on ESPN: Kattar vs. Chikadze	Jan 15, 2022	UFC Apex	Las Vegas, Nevada	United States	—N/a		Calvin Kattar	vs.	Giga Chikadze	Jake Collier	Viacheslav Borshchev	$50,000	

1. Julian Erosa received Steven Peterson's Fight of the Night bonus due to Peterson missing weight.
2. Marlon Vera received Rob Font's Fight of the Night bonus due to Font missing weight.

== See also ==
- List of UFC champions
- List of UFC events
- List of current UFC fighters
- 2022 in Bellator MMA
- 2022 in ONE Championship
- 2022 in Absolute Championship Akhmat
- 2022 in Konfrontacja Sztuk Walki
- 2022 in Rizin Fighting Federation
- 2022 in LUX Fight League
- 2022 in AMC Fight Nights
- 2022 in Brave Combat Federation
- 2022 in Road FC
- 2022 in Professional Fighters League
- 2022 in Eagle Fighting Championship
- 2022 in Legacy Fighting Alliance
- 2022 in combat sports
