= Charles Oliveira =

Brazilian mixed martial artist (born 1989)

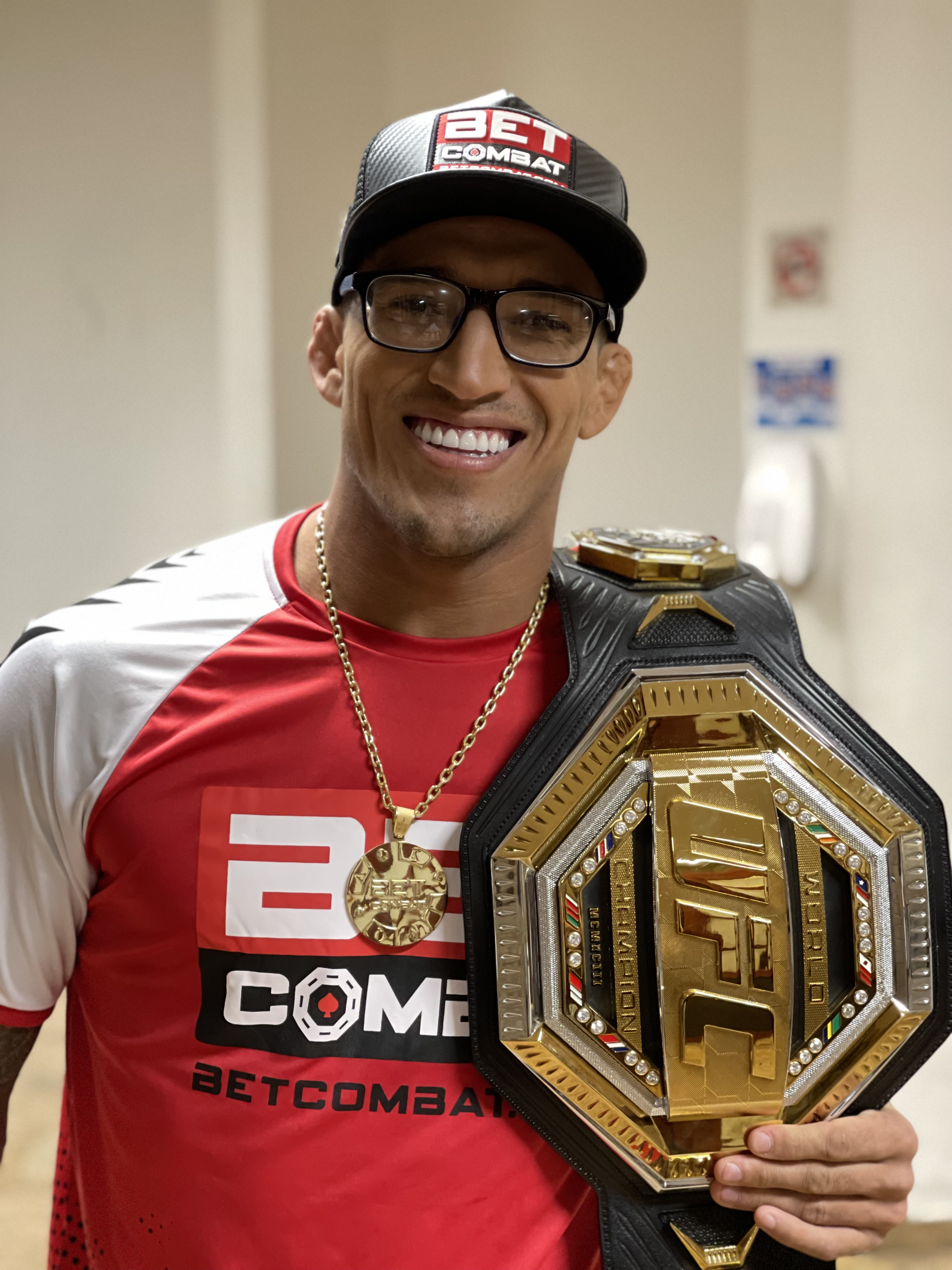
- Oliveira in 2021
- Born: Charles Oliveira da Silva; October 17, 1989 (age 37); Guarujá, São Paulo, Brazil
- Nickname: do Bronxs
- Height: 5 ft 10 in (178 cm)
- Weight: 156 lb (71 kg; 11 st 2 lb)
- Division: Featherweight (2012–2016); Lightweight (2008–2011, 2017–present); Welterweight (2008)
- Reach: 74 in (188 cm)
- Style: Brazilian jiu-jitsu
- Fighting out of: Guarujá, Brazil
- Team: Chute Boxe Academy; Macaco Gold Team (2008–2018)
- Trainer: Diego Lima
- Rank: 4th degree black belt in Brazilian Jiu-Jitsu under Jorge Patino; Black prajied in Muay Thai under Diego Lima
- Years active: 2008–present

Mixed martial arts record
- Total: 49
- Wins: 37
- By knockout: 10
- By submission: 22
- By decision: 5
- Losses: 11
- By knockout: 5
- By submission: 4
- By decision: 2
- No contests: 1

Other information
- Mixed martial arts record from Sherdog

Charles Oliveira da Silva (born October 17, 1989) is a Brazilian professional mixed martial artist and fourth degree black belt Brazilian jiu-jitsu practitioner. (Note: Under Ericson Cardoso and Jorge "Macaco" Patino) Oliveira currently competes in the Lightweight division of the Ultimate Fighting Championship (UFC), where he is a former UFC Lightweight Champion and current symbolic UFC "BMF" titleholder. As of January 27, 2026, he is #3 in the Meta UFC lightweight rankings.

Oliveira started training Brazilian jiu-jitsu in his youth, achieving multiple championship titles before transitioning to MMA in 2007. Oliveira holds multiple UFC records, notably the most submission wins in the organization's history at 17, most finishes at 21 and most bonuses at 21.

== Early life ==
From humble origins, Oliveira was born in the favela of Vicente de Carvalho in the town of Guarujá, São Paulo, Brazil on 17 October 1989. At age 7, he was diagnosed with heart murmur and rheumatic fever, and told by a doctor that he could not play sports. His parents decided against it and let him play sports as his condition healed over time. At 12 years old, a neighbor introduced him to a Brazilian jiu-jitsu gym where trainer Roger Coelho gave free classes to low-income people. His family helped fund his future training by selling street snacks and discarded cardboard. He then became São Paulo champion just two months after starting jiu-jitsu.

== Brazilian jiu-jitsu career ==
In 2004 Oliveira won the São Paulo championship a second time, the Copa Nação Jiu-Jitsu in 2005 and in 2006 won a total of 16 medals. In 2007, as a blue belt he became two-time CBJJE World Champion, winning silver the following year as a purple belt, and becoming 2008 CBJJE South American Champion. Oliveira received all his belts from Coelho up until the brown rank. (Note: Paulo was later killed, caught in a crossfire in Vicente de Carvalho when Charles was 14.)

By 2007 he started to steer his career to focus on MMA. He was awarded his black belt in Brazilian jiu-jitsu under Ericson Cardoso and Jorge "Macaco" Patino in 2010.

In January 2020 Oliveira fought a grappling superfight at the MMA event SFT 20 against Lucas Barros from Demian Maia Jiu-Jitsu. Oliveira and Barros fought with a jiu-jitsu gi in a cage under IBJJF rules. Charles won by decision.

Oliveira was booked to compete against Cristiano Souza in the main event of Gold Talents BJJ 2 on August 6, 2023.

Fellow UFC veteran Renan Barão announced in July 2023 that he had a grappling match with Oliveira arranged for a future BJJ Stars event.

== Mixed martial arts career ==
=== Early career ===
Oliveira began his career in 2007 in his home country of Brazil, compiling a record of 12–0, with six knockouts and five submissions. On three separate occasions, Oliveira has compiled multiple wins on the same night.

His first bout was in the amateur MMA event Circuito Nacional de Vale-Tudo Amador ("National Amateur Vale-Tudo Circuit") against Rui Machado, Oliveira submitted him with an armbar 15 seconds into the first round.

In March 2008, Oliveira made his professional debut at the Predador Fight Championship promotion, where his master Jorge Patino had previously participated at Predator FC 6. The event was the "Predator FC 9 – Welterweight Grand Prix", a one-night single-elimination tournament similar to the "Grand Prix" events held by Pride FC, where the competitors would have to fight three times to be crowned the champion. In the first round, Oliveira defeated Jackson Pontes via submission (rear-naked choke), which advanced him to the second stage of the tournament. Oliveira's second stage fight was against Viscardi Andrade. In the second round, Oliveira won via TKO (punches) and advanced to the final round of the tournament. Oliveira won the tournament by defeating Diego Braga via TKO (punches) in the first round of the fight.

Oliveira debuted at lightweight by defeating future UFC fighter Mehdi Baghdad in December 2008 at the first event of promotion "Kawai Arena". After that he entered into another tournament at "Korea Fight", where he defeated Daniel Fernandes and Eliene Silva via KO and TKO, respectively.

Oliveira submitted three opponents in a row over the next few months (including Bellator veteran Alexandre Bezerra), and won a split decision over Eduardo Pachu.

Oliveira once again competed twice in one night, in February 2010, defeating Rosenildo Rocha via submission (rear-naked choke) in the first round and Diego Bataglia via KO (slam).

=== Ultimate Fighting Championship ===
==== 2010 ====
In January 2010, Oliveira was named as the third-best Brazilian prospect to watch in 2010, according to Sherdog.

Oliveira then signed for the UFC and made his debut against Darren Elkins. This fight was originally scheduled for The Ultimate Fighter: Team Liddell vs. Team Ortiz Finale, but was rescheduled for UFC Live: Jones vs. Matyushenko due to visa issues. Oliveira defeated Elkins via submission (armbar) after 41 seconds of the first round. Oliveira was taken down early by Elkins but quickly attempted a triangle choke, before transitioning to an armbar, forcing the tap out. The submission earned him the Submission of the Night award.

Oliveira next fought against Efraín Escudero at UFC Fight Night 22 replacing an injured Matt Wiman. The bout, which served as co-main event would become a catchweight bout after Escudero weighed in at 159 lb. Oliveira went on to defeat Escudero in the third round via standing rear-naked choke. Oliveira was awarded the Submission of the Night award for his second successive UFC appearance.

Oliveira faced Jim Miller on December 11, 2010, at UFC 124. Oliveira was quickly submitted via kneebar in the first round; this marked the first loss of his career.

==== 2011 ====
Oliveira faced Nik Lentz on June 26, 2011, at UFC Live: Kongo vs. Barry. The fight ended in the second round after Oliveira hit Lentz with an illegal knee which went unnoticed by the referee and submitted the dazed Lentz via rear-naked choke. However, after reviewing the incident, the Pennsylvania State Athletic Commission overturned the result and declared it a no contest. The back and forth action earned both fighters Fight of the Night honors.

Oliveira was expected to face Joe Lauzon on November 19, 2011, at UFC 138. However, Oliveira instead faced Donald Cerrone on August 14, 2011, at UFC on Versus 5, replacing an injured Paul Taylor. He lost the fight via TKO (punches) at 3:01 of the first round. His trainer stated that after going 0–2–1 NC in his last 3 fights he planned to drop down to the featherweight division.

==== 2012 ====
Oliveira was originally meant to face Robert Peralta on January 20, 2012, at UFC on FX: Guillard vs. Miller, but instead faced promotional newcomer Eric Wisely in a featherweight fight on January 28, 2012, at UFC on Fox: Evans vs. Davis. Oliveira won the fight via reverse calf slicer submission in the first round, marking the first time the technique had been used to finish an opponent in UFC history. This fight earned him another Submission of the Night award.

Oliveira faced Jonathan Brookins on June 1, 2012, at The Ultimate Fighter 15 Finale. Oliveira used his speed to outstrike Brookins and won the fight via second round anaconda choke.

Oliveira faced Cub Swanson on September 22, 2012, at UFC 152. Early in the first round, Swanson hit Oliveira with body shots, which visibly appeared to hurt Oliveira. Swanson followed it up with an overhand right, sending Oliveira to the canvas and resulting in a KO.

==== 2013 ====
Oliveira faced Frankie Edgar on July 6, 2013, at UFC 162. He lost the bout via unanimous decision. Both fighters earned Fight of the Night honors for their performance.

Oliveira was expected to face Estevan Payan on October 19, 2013, at UFC 166. However, Payan was forced out of the bout citing a broken foot and was replaced by Jeremy Larsen. Subsequently, on October 5, Oliveira pulled out of the Larsen bout citing a strained thigh muscle.

==== 2014 ====
Oliveira faced Andy Ogle on February 15, 2014, at UFC Fight Night 36. He won the fight via triangle choke submission in the third round. The win also earned him one of the first UFC Performance of the Night bonus awards.

Oliveira faced Hatsu Hioki on June 28, 2014, at UFC Fight Night 43. He won the fight via submission and became the first man to finish Hioki. This fight earned him another Performance of the Night award.

Oliveira was expected to face Nik Lentz in a rematch on September 5, 2014, at UFC Fight Night 50. At the event weigh-in, Oliveira came in over the 146-pound featherweight limit at 150 pounds. Subsequently, he was initially forced to surrender 20 percent of his purse to his opponent Nik Lentz and the bout was changed to a catchweight affair. In turn, Oliveira was pulled from the event entirely on the day of the event after he fell ill from the effects of the weight cutting process.

Oliveira faced Jeremy Stephens on December 12, 2014, at The Ultimate Fighter 20 Finale. He won the fight via unanimous decision.

==== 2015 ====
Oliveira finally faced Nik Lentz in a rematch on May 30, 2015, at UFC Fight Night 67. Following a back and forth first two rounds, Oliveira won the fight via guillotine choke submission in the third round. The win earned Oliveira his third Performance of the Night bonus and his third Fight of the Night bonus.

Oliveira faced Max Holloway on August 23, 2015, at UFC Fight Night 74. He lost the fight via TKO in the first round, after suffering an apparent neck/shoulder injury while attempting a takedown, and was rendered unable to continue. The injury was later described as a micro-tear in his esophagus, although Oliveira was released from a Saskatoon hospital the next day, and tested negative for major chest, neck and/or throat injuries. He later confirmed that he suffered a minor neck injury, related to a previous injury from his training camp. He did not require surgery.

Oliveira faced Myles Jury on December 19, 2015, at UFC on Fox 17. In the lead up to the fight Oliveira missed weight – his third time in his UFC career – for the bout and it was subsequently contested at a catchweight. Oliveira won the fight via submission in the first round.

==== 2016 ====
Oliveira next faced Anthony Pettis on August 27, 2016, at UFC on Fox 21. After a grueling back-and-forth battle, Pettis submitted Oliveira in the third round via guillotine choke.

Oliveira faced Ricardo Lamas on November 5, 2016, at The Ultimate Fighter Latin America 3 Finale. The bout was contested at a catchweight of 155 lbs, as Oliveira missed weight by nearly 10 lbs. Lamas won the fight via submission in the second round.

==== 2017 ====
Oliveira faced Will Brooks in a lightweight bout on April 8, 2017, at UFC 210. He won the fight by rear-naked choke submission in the first round. He was awarded a Performance of the Night bonus.

Oliveira faced Paul Felder on December 2, 2017, at UFC 218. He lost the fight via TKO in the second round after Felder landed multiple elbows while in Oliveira's guard.

==== 2018 ====
In 2018 joined Chute Boxe Diego Lima in São Paulo. According to him, his former gym Macaco Gold Team (headed by Jorge "Macaco" Patino) was mostly focused BJJ with complementary striking, while he was confident with his groundfighting skills, he felt he needed to improve his striking game. Patino is still his BJJ coach but now he is complemented with Chute Boxe's trademark aggressive Muay Thai style.

Oliveira faced Clay Guida at UFC 225, replacing an injured Bobby Green. He won the fight via guillotine choke submission in the first round. The win earned him his fifth Performance of the Night bonus.

Oliveira faced returning veteran Christos Giagos on September 22, 2018, at UFC Fight Night 137. He won the fight via submission in the second round. With this win, Oliveira passed Royce Gracie for the most submission wins (11) in UFC history. This win earned him the Performance of the Night award.

Oliveira faced Jim Miller in a rematch on December 15, 2018, at UFC on Fox 31. He won the fight via a rear-naked choke submission early in the first round. The win earned him a seventh Performance of the Night award (setting a new record), and extended the record for most submissions in UFC History with 12.

==== 2019 ====
Oliveira faced David Teymur on February 2, 2019, at UFC Fight Night 144. He won the fight in the second round after stunning Teymur with an upward elbow and punches before applying an anaconda choke. With this win, Oliveira extended the UFC record for most submission wins to thirteen. This win earned him the Performance of the Night award.

As the first fight of his new, five-fight contract, a trilogy fight with Nik Lentz took place on May 18, 2019, at UFC Fight Night 152. Oliveira won the fight via TKO in the second round.

Replacing Leonardo Santos, Oliveira then faced Jared Gordon on November 16, 2019, at UFC Fight Night 164. Oliveira won the fight by knockout in the first round. This win earned him the Performance of the Night award.

==== 2020 ====
Oliveira faced Kevin Lee on March 14, 2020, as the main event at UFC Fight Night 170. At the weigh-ins, Lee weighed in at 158.5 lbs, 2.5 lbs over the lightweight non-title fight limit of 156 pounds. Lee was fined 20% of his purse and his bout with Oliveira proceeded as scheduled at a catchweight. Oliveira won the fight via submission with a guillotine choke in the third round. This win earned him the Performance of the Night award. With this win, Oliveira also extended the UFC record for most submission wins to 14, moved to second place in terms of bonuses received with 16, extended his finishing streak to 7, and tied with Donald Cerrone for the most finishes in the UFC.

Oliveira was scheduled to meet Beneil Dariush on October 4, 2020, at UFC on ESPN: Holm vs. Aldana. However, Oliveira pulled out of the fight in early September for undisclosed reasons.

Oliveira faced Tony Ferguson on December 12, 2020, at UFC 256 in the co-main event. After nearly submitting Ferguson with an armbar in the first round, Oliveira won the fight via unanimous decision. It was his first win by decision since his fight against Jeremy Stephens in 2014.

==== UFC Lightweight Champion ====
===== 2021 =====
Oliveira faced former three-time Bellator Lightweight Champion Michael Chandler for the vacant UFC Lightweight Championship, following previous champion Khabib Nurmagomedov's retirement, while headlining UFC 262 on May 15, 2021. Despite being dropped by Chandler in the first round, Oliveira won the fight via technical knockout early in the second round to claim the title. With the knockout win, he broke yet another record, recording the most finishes in UFC history. This win also earned Oliveira the Performance of the Night bonus award.

Oliveira made his first title defense against former UFC Interim Lightweight champion Dustin Poirier on December 11, 2021, at UFC 269. After being knocked down in the first round, Oliveira won the fight by submitting Poirier with a standing rear-naked choke in the first minute of the third round. The win also earned Oliveira his twelfth Performance of the Night bonus award, a new record for the company.

==== 2022 ====
Oliveira was set to make his second title defense against another former UFC Interim Lightweight Champion, Justin Gaethje, on May 7, at UFC 274. At the weigh-ins, Oliveira weighed in at 155.5 pounds, half a pound over the divisional title limit. As a result, upon commencement of the fight, Oliveira was officially stripped of the championship, and only Gaethje was eligible to win the title. This was the first time in UFC history that a title was vacated due to a weight miss. After being knocked down, Oliveira dropped Gaethje with a right hand and rallied to win the fight via rear-naked choke submission in the first round, and was declared the number one contender to the UFC Lightweight Championship. The win also earned him the third place Crypto.com "Fan Bonus of the Night" award.

The decision to strip Oliveira of the championship proved controversial in what was dubbed "scale gate", as other fighters on the UFC 274 card alleged issues with the scales. Marc Ratner, Vice President of Regulatory Affairs at the UFC, stated that the other fighters were referring to the UFC's practice scale put out the night before, not the one used by the Arizona State Athletic Commission for the official weigh-in; "Some fighters wanted to change the scale from pounds to kilograms, which you can do, and I think that may have knocked it – we don't have any proof of anything, but it may have knocked the [practice] scale out of calibration." The night before, Oliveira had stated that he was on weight using the practice scale. As a result of the allegations, UFC president Dana White stated that the UFC would hire a security guard to watch the practice scale going forward. Ariel Helwani and Dustin Poirier questioned why state athletic commissions still use balance or beam scales, which allow human error, for official weights and not more accurate digital scales. Daniel Cormier, Junior dos Santos, and Glover Teixeira criticized stripping a champion over half a pound, an amount that is acceptable for non-title fights, as excessive. In addition to citing previous UFC matches that were allowed to go ahead as championship title fights despite questionable weigh-ins, Helwani noted how state athletic commissions have no say in what happens to a championship belt and that it was entirely the UFC's decision to strip Oliveira of the title.

Oliveira faced Islam Makhachev for the vacant UFC Lightweight Championship at UFC 280 on October 22, 2022. Oliveira lost the fight via arm-triangle choke submission in the second round after getting knocked down with a right hook.

==== 2023 ====
Oliveira was scheduled to face Beneil Dariush on May 6, 2023, at UFC 288. However, Oliveira was forced out of the event due to injury and the bout was cancelled and postponed to UFC 289. He won the bout via technical knockout in the first round, finishing Dariush with ground and pound. The win also earned Oliveira his thirteenth Performance of the Night bonus award.

Oliveira was booked to challenge Islam Makhachev in a rematch for the lightweight world championship at UFC 294 on October 21, 2023. However, Oliveira was forced off from the event due to injuries and he was replaced by Alexander Volkanovski.

==== 2024 ====
Oliveira faced Arman Tsarukyan on April 13, 2024 at UFC 300. Despite having two close submission attempts, he lost the bout via split decision in this UFC lightweight title eliminator.

Oliveira faced former three-time Bellator Lightweight World Champion and former UFC Lightweight title challenger Michael Chandler in a 5-round co-main event rematch on November 16, 2024 at UFC 309. He won the fight by unanimous decision. This fight earned him another Fight of the Night award.

==== 2025 ====
On April 26, 2025, it was announced that Oliveira will be a recipient of the 2025 UFC Forrest Griffin Community Award for his institute "ICBronxs" which provides local youth with free education and jiu-jitsu training.

Oliveira faced former UFC Featherweight Champion Ilia Topuria for the vacant UFC Lightweight Championship on June 28, 2025 at UFC 317. He lost the fight by knockout in the first round.

Oliveira was scheduled to face Rafael Fiziev in the main event on October 11, 2025, at UFC Fight Night 261. However, Fiziev withdrew from the bout due to a knee injury, and was replaced by Mateusz Gamrot. Oliveira won the fight via a face crank submission in the second round. This fight earned him another Performance of the Night award.

==== UFC 'BMF' Champion ====
===== 2026 =====
During the UFC 2026 seasonal press conference it was announced that Oliveira would be facing Max Holloway in a rematch for the symbolic UFC 'BMF' belt at UFC 326 on March 7, 2026. Oliveira won the title via unanimous decision.

Oliveira was reportedly scheduled to defend his belt in a rematch against Arman Tsarukyan on September 19, 2026 at UFC 331. However, the promotion announced Oliveira would not be competing on the card and that Tsaryukan would instead face Maurício Ruffy. The withdrawal came just days after the death of Oliveira's longtime teammate, UFC flyweight Allan Nascimento. Nascimento had died from an apparent heart attack and passing at the age of 34.

Oliveira is scheduled to defend his BMF belt against Diego Lopes on December 12, 2026 at UFC 335.

== Fighting style ==
Oliveira’s fighting style blends high-pressure Muay Thai striking with one of the most dangerous submission games in UFC history. Known for his aggression from the opening bell, he often walks opponents down with straight punches, elbows, and knees, using pressure and timing rather than volume alone.

His grappling is regarded as elite even among decorated submission specialists. Oliveira holds the record for most submission wins in UFC history, with a wide arsenal that includes rear-naked chokes, guillotines, triangles, and more unorthodox setups. What makes him particularly dangerous is his willingness to attack submissions in transition — whether from scrambles, knockdowns, or standing clinch breaks. He has also shown improved takedown entries and top pressure, but still remains most lethal when catching opponents during chaotic exchanges.

== Other media ==
In 2025, 405 Films announced it secured the life rights for a biopic based on Oliveira's early years and rise in the UFC. The film will be produced by Eduardo Ferro and shot in Brazil and Las Vegas.

== Personal life ==
Oliveira resides in Guarujá, living near his old neighbourhood of Vicente de Carvalho, and helps his neighbourhood with regular charities. His main project is the Instituto Charles do Bronx (ICBronxs), founded in 2012, which offers free jiu-jitsu classes, basic education, nutritional support and cultural activities for children and teenagers in the community.

Oliveira is a devout Christian. Oliveira was previously nearsighted, and wore eyeglasses all of the time. On having to remove them to fight, he said, "If I take my glasses off, I only see 50 per cent but it never hindered me in a fight", "I see three [faces]. If I hit the middle one, that's fine". In October 2022, Oliveira said his eyes are "100 percent perfect" after having had corrective eye surgery.

In February 2023, Oliveira announced that he was joining OnlyFans to provide a subscription-based service to his fans, where they can see his workouts and training regime among other content.

Oliveira has a passion for Harness racing, and in 2021, he participated in events in São Paulo and stood out by winning a race alongside renowned American driver Tim Tetrick. He is also a declared fan of the football club Corinthians and, since the end of 2021, has served as the club's official ambassador in fighting sports.

Oliveira has two children: a daughter, Tayla, born in 2017 during his marriage to Talita Roberta Pereira, and a son, Dominic, born on October 5, 2024, with his girlfriend Vitoria Brum.

In 2025, Oliveira became a brand ambassador as part of a multi-year branding deal between the UFC and Spribe.

=== Nickname ===
Oliveira's nickname "do Bronxs", literally meaning "from the Bronx", as "Bronx" was a slang used for favelas and poor neighbourhoods. In an interview he revealed: "Bronx is because it's a favela, right? Outskirts, where I come from. "Do Bronxs" practically came when I went to fight in a [amateur] tournament. [...] And they told me to get them a nickname, I was just Charles Oliveira. When we went to fight some jiu-jitsu championships, they always said 'look at the guys from the Bronx, from the favela'. So I put "do Bronxs" in".

== Instructor lineage ==
=== Brazilian Jiu-Jitsu ===
Kanō Jigorō → Mitsuyo Maeda → Carlos Gracie → Hélio Gracie → Rickson Gracie → Marcelo Behring → Waldomiro Perez → Jorge Patino → Charles Oliveira

=== Muay Thai ===
Nélio "Naja" Borges de Souza → Rudimar Fedrigo → Diego Lima → Charles Oliveira

== Championships and accomplishments ==
=== Brazilian jiu-jitsu ===
Main Achievements (Colored Belts):

- CBJJE South American Champion (2008 purple belt)
- CBJJE World Champion (2007 blue belt (Note: Weight and absolute))
- FPJJ São Paulo State Champion (2007 blue belt)
- 2nd place CBJJE World Cup (2008 purple belt)

=== Mixed martial arts ===
- Ultimate Fighting Championship
  - UFC Lightweight Championship (One time)
    - One successful title defense
  - UFC 'BMF' title (One time, current)
  - Fight of the Night (Four times) vs. Nik Lentz 1 & 2, Frankie Edgar and Michael Chandler 2
  - Performance of the Night (Fourteen times) vs. Andy Ogle, Hatsu Hioki, Nik Lentz 2, Will Brooks, Clay Guida, Christos Giagos, Jim Miller 2, David Teymur, Jared Gordon, Kevin Lee, Michael Chandler 1, Dustin Poirier, Beneil Dariush and Mateusz Gamrot
    - Most Performance of the Night bonuses in UFC history (14)
  - Submission of the Night (Three times) vs. Darren Elkins, Efraín Escudero and Eric Wisely
    - Most Post-Fight bonuses in UFC history (21)
    - Tied (Joe Lauzon & Jim Miller) for second most Post-Fight bonuses in UFC Lightweight division history (15) (behind Justin Gaethje)
    - Second most Post-Fight bonuses in UFC/WEC combined history (21) (behind Donald Cerrone)
  - Most finishes in UFC history (21)
    - Tied (Mirko Cro Cop) for most finishes in Zuffa, LLC (UFC, Pride, WEC, Strikeforce) history (21)
    - Second most finishes in UFC Lightweight division history (15) (behind Jim Miller)
    - Tied (Chuck Liddell) for the third longest finish streak in UFC history (7)
  - Most submission wins in UFC history (17)
    - Most submission wins in UFC Featherweight division history (6)
    - Second most submission wins in UFC Lightweight division history (11) (behind Jim Miller)
    - Second most submission attempts in UFC history (51) (behind Jim Miller)
      - Second most submission attempts in UFC Lightweight division history (35) (behind Jim Miller)
    - Tied (Brendan Allen & Beatriz Mesquita) for fourth longest submission streak in UFC History (4)
    - Sixth most rear-naked choke submissions in UFC history (6)
    - Second most guillotine-choke submissions in UFC history (4) (behind Nate Diaz & Jim Miller)
    - Tied (Makwan Amirkhani & Vicente Luque) for most anaconda-choke submissions in UFC history (3)
  - Tied (Neil Magny) for second most wins in UFC history (25) (behind Jim Miller)
    - Second most wins in UFC Lightweight division history (18) (behind Jim Miller)
    - Tied (Dan Henderson & Neil Magny) for fourth most wins in Zuffa, LLC (UFC, Pride, WEC, Strikeforce) history (25)
  - Fourth longest win streak in UFC Lightweight division history (11)
  - Tied (Clay Guida & Rafael dos Anjos) for the fifth most bouts in UFC history (37)
    - Tied (Beneil Dariush & Drew Dober) for seventh most bouts in UFC Lightweight division history (25)
  - Sixth most top position time in UFC Lightweight division history (1:06:05)
  - Fourth highest significant strike accuracy percentage in UFC Lightweight division history (57.5%)
  - Sixth most control time in a UFC bout (20:49) (vs. Max Holloway 2)
  - Holds wins over four former UFC champions — vs. Justin Gaethje, Max Holloway, Tony Ferguson (interim) & Dustin Poirier (interim)
  - 2025 Forrest Griffin Community Award
  - UFC Honors Awards
    - 2020: President's Choice Performance of the Year Nominee vs. Kevin Lee
    - 2021: Fan's Choice Comeback of the Year Winner vs. Michael Chandler 1 & President's Choice Performance of the Year Nominee vs. Michael Chandler 1
  - UFC.com Awards
    - 2010: Ranked #3 Newcomer of the Year
    - 2012: Ranked #3 Submission of the Year vs. Eric Wisely
    - 2014: Submission of the Year vs. Hatsu Hioki
    - 2018: Ranked #5 Submission of the Year vs. Christos Giagos
    - 2019: Ranked #9 Submission of the Year vs. David Teymur
    - 2020: Ranked #5 Submission of the Year vs. Kevin Lee & Ranked #9 Fighter of the Year
    - 2021: Ranked #2 Fighter of the Year & Ranked #10 Fight of the Year vs. Michael Chandler 1
    - 2022: Half-Year Awards: Best Fighter of the 1HY & Ranked #8 Submission of the Year vs. Justin Gaethje
    - 2023: Ranked #5 Knockout of the Year vs. Beneil Dariush
- Predator FC
  - Welterweight Grand Prix Champion
- Cageside Press
  - 2021 Comeback of the Year (tied w/ Sergio Pettis) vs. Michael Chandler
- Daily Mirror
  - 2021 Fighter of the Year
- MMA Sucka
  - 2021 Male Fighter of the Year
- MMA Junkie
  - 2014 February Submission of the Month vs. Andy Ogle
  - 2015 May Submission of the Month vs. Nik Lentz
  - 2020 March Submission of the Month vs. Kevin Lee
  - 2021 May Fight of the Month vs. Michael Chandler
  - 2022 May Submission of the Month vs. Justin Gaethje
- MMA Mania
  - 2014 Submission of the Year vs. Hatsu Hioki
- Sherdog
  - 2014 Submission of the Year vs. Hatsu Hioki
  - 2021 Fighter of the Year
- World MMA Awards
  - 2021 Comeback of the Year vs. Michael Chandler at UFC 262
  - 2022 Submission of the Year vs. Dustin Poirier at UFC 269
- ESPY Awards
  - 2022 Fighter of the Year
- ESPN
  - 2022 Submission of the Year vs. Justin Gaethje
- Bloody Elbow
  - 2012 Submission of the Year vs. Eric Wisely at UFC on Fox 2
- Sports Illustrated
  - 2022 Submission of the Year vs. Justin Gaethje at UFC 274
- BodySlam.net
  - 2024 Round of the Year Round 5 vs. Michael Chandler at UFC 309
- CBS Sports
  - 2021 #2 Ranked UFC Fighter of the Year
  - 2021 #3 Ranked UFC Fight of the Year vs. Michael Chandler
- Slacky Awards
  - 2020 Technical Turn-Around of the Year
- FIGHT! Magazine
  - 2012 Submission of the Year vs. Eric Wisely at UFC on Fox: Evans vs. Davis

== Mixed martial arts record ==
Professional record breakdown
49 matches	37 wins	11 losses
By knockout	10	5
By submission	22	4
By decision	5	2
No contests	1	

Res.	Record	Opponent	Method	Event	Date	Round	Time	Location	Notes
Win	37–11 (1)	Max Holloway	Decision (unanimous)	UFC 326	March 7, 2026	5	5:00	Las Vegas, Nevada, United States	Won the symbolic UFC "BMF" title.
Win	36–11 (1)	Mateusz Gamrot	Submission (face crank)	UFC Fight Night: Oliveira vs. Gamrot	October 11, 2025	2	2:48	Rio de Janeiro, Brazil	Extended the UFC record for most finishes (21) and most submissions (17). Performance of the Night.
Loss	35–11 (1)	Ilia Topuria	KO (punches)	UFC 317	June 28, 2025	1	2:27	Las Vegas, Nevada, United States	For the vacant UFC Lightweight Championship.
Win	35–10 (1)	Michael Chandler	Decision (unanimous)	UFC 309	November 16, 2024	5	5:00	New York City, New York, United States	Fight of the Night.
Loss	34–10 (1)	Arman Tsarukyan	Decision (split)	UFC 300	April 13, 2024	3	5:00	Las Vegas, Nevada, United States	UFC Lightweight title eliminator.
Win	34–9 (1)	Beneil Dariush	TKO (punches)	UFC 289	June 10, 2023	1	4:10	Vancouver, British Columbia, Canada	Performance of the Night.
Loss	33–9 (1)	Islam Makhachev	Submission (arm-triangle choke)	UFC 280	October 22, 2022	2	3:16	Abu Dhabi, United Arab Emirates	For the vacant UFC Lightweight Championship.
Win	33–8 (1)	Justin Gaethje	Submission (rear-naked choke)	UFC 274	May 7, 2022	1	3:22	Phoenix, Arizona, United States	Oliveira missed weight (155.5 lb) and was stripped of the UFC Lightweight Championship. Only Gaethje was eligible to win the title.
Win	32–8 (1)	Dustin Poirier	Submission (rear-naked choke)	UFC 269	December 11, 2021	3	1:02	Las Vegas, Nevada, United States	Defended the UFC Lightweight Championship. Performance of the Night.
Win	31–8 (1)	Michael Chandler	TKO (punches)	UFC 262	May 15, 2021	2	0:19	Houston, Texas, United States	Won the vacant UFC Lightweight Championship. Broke the UFC record for most finishes (17). Performance of the Night.
Win	30–8 (1)	Tony Ferguson	Decision (unanimous)	UFC 256	December 12, 2020	3	5:00	Las Vegas, Nevada, United States	
Win	29–8 (1)	Kevin Lee	Submission (guillotine choke)	UFC Fight Night: Lee vs. Oliveira	March 14, 2020	3	0:28	Brasília, Brazil	Catchweight (158.5 lb) bout; Lee missed weight. Performance of the Night.
Win	28–8 (1)	Jared Gordon	KO (punches)	UFC Fight Night: Błachowicz vs. Jacaré	November 16, 2019	1	1:26	São Paulo, Brazil	Performance of the Night.
Win	27–8 (1)	Nik Lentz	TKO (punches)	UFC Fight Night: dos Anjos vs. Lee	May 18, 2019	2	2:11	Rochester, New York, United States	
Win	26–8 (1)	David Teymur	Submission (anaconda choke)	UFC Fight Night: Assunção vs. Moraes 2	February 2, 2019	2	0:55	Fortaleza, Brazil	Teymur was deducted one point in round 1 due to an eye poke. Performance of the Night.
Win	25–8 (1)	Jim Miller	Submission (rear-naked choke)	UFC on Fox: Lee vs. Iaquinta 2	December 15, 2018	1	1:15	Milwaukee, Wisconsin, United States	Performance of the Night.
Win	24–8 (1)	Christos Giagos	Submission (rear-naked choke)	UFC Fight Night: Santos vs. Anders	September 22, 2018	2	3:22	São Paulo, Brazil	Broke the UFC record for most submission wins (11). Performance of the Night.
Win	23–8 (1)	Clay Guida	Submission (guillotine choke)	UFC 225	June 9, 2018	1	2:18	Chicago, Illinois, United States	Performance of the Night.
Loss	22–8 (1)	Paul Felder	TKO (elbows)	UFC 218	December 2, 2017	2	4:06	Detroit, Michigan, United States	
Win	22–7 (1)	Will Brooks	Submission (rear-naked choke)	UFC 210	April 8, 2017	1	2:30	Buffalo, New York, United States	Return to Lightweight. Performance of the Night.
Loss	21–7 (1)	Ricardo Lamas	Submission (guillotine choke)	The Ultimate Fighter Latin America 3 Finale: dos Anjos vs. Ferguson	November 5, 2016	2	2:13	Mexico City, Mexico	Catchweight (155 lb) bout; Oliveira missed weight.
Loss	21–6 (1)	Anthony Pettis	Submission (guillotine choke)	UFC on Fox: Maia vs. Condit	August 27, 2016	3	1:49	Vancouver, British Columbia, Canada	
Win	21–5 (1)	Myles Jury	Submission (guillotine choke)	UFC on Fox: dos Anjos vs. Cowboy 2	December 19, 2015	1	3:05	Orlando, Florida, United States	Catchweight (150.5 lb) bout; Oliveira missed weight.
Loss	20–5 (1)	Max Holloway	TKO (neck injury)	UFC Fight Night: Holloway vs. Oliveira	August 23, 2015	1	1:39	Saskatoon, Saskatchewan, Canada	
Win	20–4 (1)	Nik Lentz	Submission (guillotine choke)	UFC Fight Night: Condit vs. Alves	May 30, 2015	3	1:10	Goiânia, Brazil	Performance of the Night. Fight of the Night.
Win	19–4 (1)	Jeremy Stephens	Decision (unanimous)	The Ultimate Fighter: A Champion Will Be Crowned Finale	December 12, 2014	3	5:00	Las Vegas, Nevada, United States	Catchweight (146.5 lb) bout; Oliveira missed weight.
Win	18–4 (1)	Hatsu Hioki	Submission (anaconda choke)	UFC Fight Night: Te Huna vs. Marquardt	June 28, 2014	2	4:32	Auckland, New Zealand	Performance of the Night.
Win	17–4 (1)	Andy Ogle	Submission (triangle choke)	UFC Fight Night: Machida vs. Mousasi	February 15, 2014	3	2:40	Jaraguá do Sul, Brazil	Performance of the Night.
Loss	16–4 (1)	Frankie Edgar	Decision (unanimous)	UFC 162	July 6, 2013	3	5:00	Las Vegas, Nevada, United States	Fight of the Night.
Loss	16–3 (1)	Cub Swanson	KO (punch)	UFC 152	September 22, 2012	1	2:40	Toronto, Ontario, Canada	Catchweight (146.2 lb) bout; Oliveira missed weight.
Win	16–2 (1)	Jonathan Brookins	Submission (anaconda choke)	The Ultimate Fighter: Live Finale	June 1, 2012	2	2:42	Las Vegas, Nevada, United States	
Win	15–2 (1)	Eric Wisely	Submission (calf slicer)	UFC on Fox: Evans vs. Davis	January 28, 2012	1	1:43	Chicago, Illinois, United States	Featherweight debut. Submission of the Night.
Loss	14–2 (1)	Donald Cerrone	TKO (punches)	UFC Live: Hardy vs. Lytle	August 14, 2011	1	3:01	Milwaukee, Wisconsin, United States	
NC	14–1 (1)	Nik Lentz	NC (illegal knee)	UFC Live: Kongo vs. Barry	June 26, 2011	2	1:48	Pittsburgh, Pennsylvania, United States	Originally a submission (rear-naked choke) win for Oliveira; overturned due to an illegal knee. Fight of the Night.
Loss	14–1	Jim Miller	Submission (kneebar)	UFC 124	December 11, 2010	1	1:59	Montreal, Quebec, Canada	
Win	14–0	Efraín Escudero	Submission (rear-naked choke)	UFC Fight Night: Marquardt vs. Palhares	September 15, 2010	3	2:25	Austin, Texas, United States	Catchweight (159 lb) bout; Escudero missed weight. Submission of the Night.
Win	13–0	Darren Elkins	Submission (triangle armbar)	UFC Live: Jones vs. Matyushenko	August 1, 2010	1	0:41	San Diego, California, United States	Submission of the Night.
Win	12–0	Diego Battaglia	KO (slam)	Warriors Challenge 5	February 14, 2010	1	N/A	Porto Belo, Brazil	
Win	11–0	Rosenildo Rocha	Submission (rear-naked choke)	Warriors Challenge 5	February 14, 2010	1	1:21	Porto Belo, Brazil	
Win	10–0	Eduardo Pachu	Decision (split)	Eagle FC 1	September 26, 2009	3	5:00	Guarulhos, Brazil	
Win	9–0	Alexandre Bezerra	Submission (anaconda choke)	First Class Fight 3	September 18, 2009	2	1:11	São Paulo, Brazil	
Win	8–0	Dom Stanco	Submission (rear-naked choke)	Ring of Combat 24	April 17, 2009	1	3:33	Atlantic City, New Jersey, United States	
Win	7–0	Carlos Soares	Submission (triangle armbar)	Jungle Fight 12	March 21, 2009	1	2:48	Rio de Janeiro, Brazil	
Win	6–0	Elieni Silva	TKO (knee and punches)	Korea Fight 1	December 29, 2008	2	N/A	Santos, Brazil	
Win	5–0	Daniel Fernandes	KO (strikes)	Korea Fight 1	December 29, 2008	N/A	N/A	Santos, Brazil	
Win	4–0	Mehdi Baghdad	TKO (punches)	Kawai Arena 1	December 13, 2008	1	1:01	São José dos Campos, Brazil	Lightweight debut.
Win	3–0	Diego Braga	TKO (punches)	Predador FC 9	March 15, 2008	1	2:30	São Paulo, Brazil	Won the Predador FC Welterweight Grand Prix.
Win	2–0	Viscardi Andrade	TKO (punches)	Predador FC 9	March 15, 2008	2	2:47	São Paulo, Brazil	Predador FC Welterweight Grand Prix Semifinal.
Win	1–0	Jackson Pontes	Submission (rear-naked choke)	Predador FC 9	March 15, 2008	1	2:11	São Paulo, Brazil	Welterweight debut. Predador FC Welterweight Grand Prix Quarterfinal.

=== Amateur mixed martial arts record ===
Amateur record breakdown		
1 match	1 win	0 losses
By submission	1	0

Res.	Record	Opponent	Method	Event	Date	Round	Time	Location	Notes
Win	1–0	Rui Machado	Submission (armbar)	Circuito Nacional de Vale-Tudo Amador	November 3, 2007	1	0:15	Rio de Janeiro, Brazil	

== Pay-per-view bouts ==
No.	Event	Fight	Date	Venue	City	PPV buys
1.	UFC 262	Oliveira vs. Chandler	15 May 2021	Toyota Center	Houston, Texas, United States	300,000
2.	UFC 269	Oliveira vs. Poirier	11 December 2021	T-Mobile Arena	Las Vegas, Nevada, United States	500,000
3.	UFC 274	Oliveira vs. Gaethje	7 May 2022	Footprint Center	Phoenix, Arizona, United States	400,000
4.	UFC 280	Oliveira vs. Makhachev	22 October 2022	Etihad Arena	Abu Dhabi, United Arab Emirates	650,000
5.	UFC 317	Topuria vs. Oliveira	28 June 2025	T-Mobile Arena	Las Vegas, Nevada, United States	Not Disclosed

== See also ==
- List of current UFC fighters
- List of male mixed martial artists
- List of UFC records

== Notes ==
Achievements
Preceded by Khabib Nurmagomedov; Vacated	11th UFC Lightweight Champion; May 15, 2021 – May 6, 2022; Stripped	Vacant Title next held by Islam Makhachev
Preceded by Max Holloway	4th UFC BMF Champion; March 7, 2026 – present	Incumbent
Awards
Preceded by Khabib Nurmagomedov	Best MMA Fighter ESPY Award; 2022	Succeeded by Jon Jones
Preceded by Stipe Miocic	World MMA Comeback of the Year; 2020–21 vs. Michael Chandler at UFC 262	Succeeded by Aljamain Sterling
Preceded by Khabib Nurmagomedov	World MMA Submission of the Year; 2021–22 vs. Dustin Poirier at UFC 269	Succeeded by Alexa Grasso
UFC records
Preceded by Demian Maia	Most submissions June 9, 2018 – present 16	Incumbent
Preceded by Donald Cerrone	Most finishes May 15, 2021 – present 20	Incumbent
