= Islam Makhachev =

Russian mixed martial artist (born 1991)

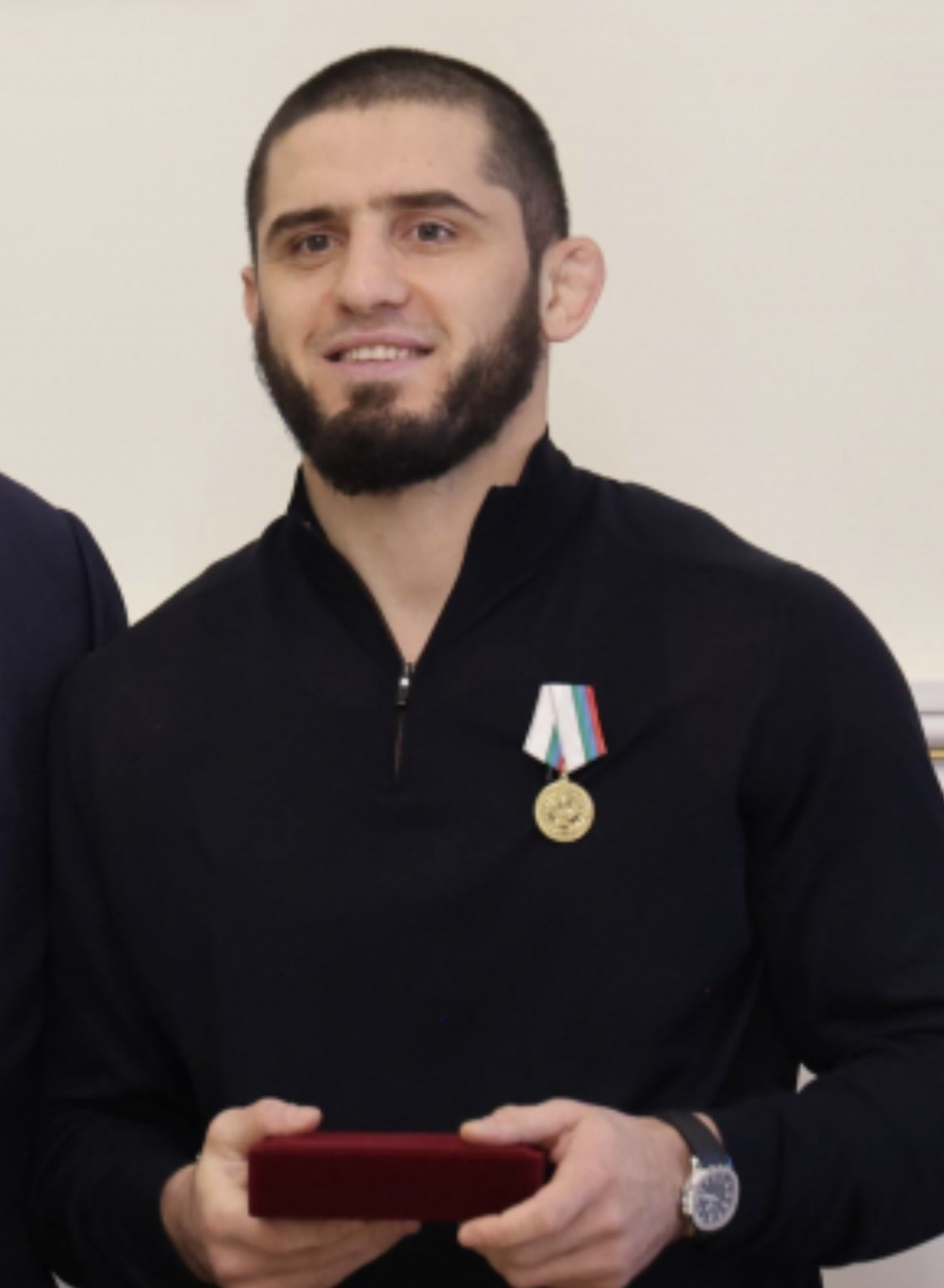
- Makhachev in 2025
- Born: Islam Ramazanovich Makhachev; 27 October 1991 (age 35); Makhachkala, Dagestan ASSR, Russian SFSR, Soviet Union
- Native name: Ислам Махачев
- Height: 5 ft 10 in (178 cm)
- Weight: 170 lb (77 kg; 12 st 2 lb)
- Division: Lightweight (2010–2025); Welterweight (2025–present)
- Reach: 70 in (178 cm)
- Style: Combat sambo
- Fighting out of: Makhachkala, Dagestan, Russia
- Team: American Kickboxing Academy; Fight Spirit Team; Gadzhi Makhachev freestyle wrestling club Old School Fighters; KHK MMA Team; Eagles MMA
- Trainer: Abdulmanap Nurmagomedov (former); Javier Mendez; Khabib Nurmagomedov
- Rank: Honored Master of Sport in combat sambo Black belt in Judo
- Years active: 2010–present

Mixed martial arts record
- Total: 30
- Wins: 29
- By knockout: 5
- By submission: 13
- By decision: 11
- Losses: 1
- By knockout: 1

Other information
- Mixed martial arts record from Sherdog

Islam Ramazanovich Makhachev (Russian: Ислам Рамазанович Махачев; born 27 October 1991) is a Russian professional mixed martial artist and former sambo competitor. He currently competes in the Welterweight division of the Ultimate Fighting Championship (UFC), where he is the current UFC Welterweight Champion and former UFC Lightweight Champion. Makhachev has competed in mixed martial arts professionally since 2010 and signed to the UFC in October 2014, making his debut in May of 2015. In February 2023 Makhachev defeated featherweight champion Alexander Volkanovski to become the #1 UFC men's pound-for-pound rankings. After UFC 322 Makhachev retained #1 in the UFC men's pound-for-pound rankings.

As a national and international sambo athlete Makhachev won a gold medal in the 74 kg division at the Russian National Combat Sambo in 2014 and 2016. He won an international championship in November 2016, when he won the world gold medal at the FIAS World Combat Sambo Championship.

Makhachev holds several UFC lightweight records, including the longest winning streak (14), the most title-fight victories (5), the most successful title defenses (4), and the highest significant-strike accuracy (59.5%). He defeated Jack Della Maddalena at UFC 322 to become the eleventh double champion in UFC history. After defeating Ian Machado Garry at UFC 330, Makhachev holds the longest winning streak in UFC history (17).

After surpassing Anderson Silva's winning streak, Makhachev is widely considered to be among the greatest mixed martial artists of all time. Fight Matrix ranks him as the 2nd greatest lightweight in UFC history after his mentor Khabib Nurmagomedov. He is also ranked in the top 20 welterweights of all time.

== Background ==
An ethnic Lak, Makhachev was born in Makhachkala and grew up in the remote village of Burshi (then part of Dagestan ASSR, Soviet Union, now part of the Republic of Dagestan, Russia). Makhachev's father grew tomatoes and worked as a driver; his mother was a housewife and ran a small café. He has an older brother named Kurbanismail. Starting at age seven, he began practicing taekwondo under decorated champion Seyfula Magomedov. Makhachev switched to sanda while attending school with Abubakar Nurmagomedov, where he also met Khabib Nurmagomedov, Shamil Zavurov, and their family. However, he gave up combat sports and played soccer for two years after his family moved to a different town.

Makhachev engaged in constant street fights as a child due to the culture of the region, where it is common for adults (such as his coach Magomedov) to pick boys to face each other or for the boys to confront each other. He trained in freestyle wrestling for a year but switched to mixed martial arts under Abdulmanap Nurmagomedov after learning that Khabib was already a professional. Makhachev had been a UFC fan since childhood; his favorite fighters were Tank Abbott and Ken Shamrock. While training, he attended Dagestan State University to study physical education and sports. In order to support himself, Makhachev worked as a security guard. His boss allowed him to train during work hours and paid his salary while Makhachev was away for competitions and training camps.

In February 2014, Makhachev won the -74 kg division at the Russian National Combat Sambo Championship, qualifying for the world championship in Japan. He was unable to compete at the 2014 world championships due to the discovery of a heart condition that required treatment. Makhachev won the -74 kg division again at the 2016 national championship, qualifying for the world championship. He then won gold at the 2016 World Combat Sambo Championship. In the finals, Makhachev beat Valentin Benishev of Bulgaria (7–0).

== Mixed martial arts career ==
=== M-1 Global ===
Makhachev made his M-1 Global debut against Tengiz Khuchua on 12 February 2011 and won the fight via KO in the first round.

In his second fight for the promotion, Makhachev faced Mansour Barnaoui, on 9 April 2013 at M-1 Challenge 38. He won via unanimous decision a (30–27, 30–27, 30–27).

Makhachev faced then-undefeated Brazilian jiu-jitsu black belt Rander Junio on 21 August 2013 at M-1 Challenge 41. He won via unanimous decision.

Makhachev faced M-1 Global Yuri Ivlev on 7 June 2014 at M-1 Challenge 49. Islam dominated the fight, he softened up Ivlev with punches before finishing the fight by submission via armbar.

On 7 September 2014, in his final bout for M-1 Global before signing with the UFC, Makhachev defeated Ivica Trušček via submission in the third round.

=== Ultimate Fighting Championship ===
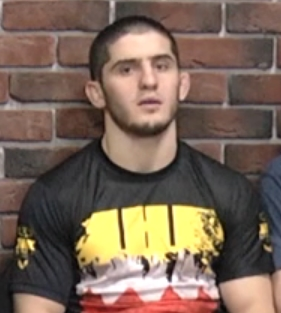
Makhachev in 2016

On 2 October 2014, Makhachev signed a four-fight contract with the UFC. He submitted Leo Kuntz in the second round on 23 May 2015, at UFC 187.

Makhachev faced Adriano Martins on 3 October 2015 at UFC 192. He lost via knockout in the first round, marking his first and only professional loss to date.

Makhachev was expected to face Drew Dober on 16 April 2016, at UFC on Fox 19. After the weigh-ins, the UFC announced that the bout was cancelled after Makhachev failed an out-of-competition drug screening, testing positive for the banned anti-ischemic meldonium. USADA lifted Makhachev's suspension after a hearing on 2 July 2016 determined that the drug was prescribed in November 2015 to recover from a medical procedure to his heart.

On 17 September 2016, he faced with Chris Wade at UFC Fight Night 94. He won the fight via unanimous decision.

Makhachev faced Nik Lentz on 11 February 2017, at UFC 208. He won the fight by unanimous decision.

Makhachev was expected to face Michel Prazeres on 2 September 2017 at UFC Fight Night 115. However, Makhachev pulled out of the fight in the beginning of August citing a religious reason, and he was replaced by Mads Burnell.

Makhachev fought Gleison Tibau on 20 January 2018 at UFC 220. He won the fight by knockout in 57 seconds in the first round.

Makhachev faced Kajan Johnson on 28 July 2018 at UFC on Fox 30. Makhachev took Johnson down in the first round, where he worked to mount and secured the armbar, forcing Johnson to tap; giving Makhachev a submission victory.

Makhachev was expected to face Francisco Trinaldo on 26 January 2019 at UFC 233. However, it was reported on 11 November 2018 Makhachev was pulled out from the event due to undisclosed reason and he was replaced by Alexander Hernandez.

Makhachev faced Arman Tsarukyan on 20 April 2019 at UFC Fight Night 149. He won the fight via unanimous decision. This win earned him the Fight of the Night award.

Makhachev faced Davi Ramos on 7 September 2019 at UFC 242. He won the fight via unanimous decision.

Makhachev was scheduled to face Alexander Hernandez on 18 April 2020 at UFC 249. However, Makhachev was removed from the card due to travel restrictions related to the COVID-19 pandemic and he was replaced by Omar Morales.

Makhachev was expected to face Rafael dos Anjos on 24 October 2020 at UFC 254. However, on 8 October 2020 it was reported that dos Anjos tested positive for COVID-19 and he was removed from the bout. The pairing was left intact and rescheduled for 14 November 2020 at UFC Fight Night: Felder vs. dos Anjos. However, on 8 November, it was reported that Makhachev was forced to pull from the event due to staph infection.

Makhachev faced Drew Dober on 6 March 2021 at UFC 259. He won the fight by an arm-triangle choke submission in the third round.

Makhachev faced Thiago Moisés on 17 July 2021 at UFC on ESPN 26. He won the fight by a rear-naked choke submission in the fourth round.

A bout with former UFC Lightweight Champion Rafael dos Anjos was rescheduled and was expected to take place on 30 October 2021 at UFC 267. However, dos Anjos was forced to pulled from the event due to injury, and he was replaced by Dan Hooker. He won the fight by a kimura submission in the first round.

Makhachev was scheduled to face Beneil Dariush on 26 February 2022 at UFC Fight Night 202. However, on 12 February 2022 it was reported that Dariush withdrew from the event due to an ankle injury and he was replaced by Bobby Green. He won the bout via ground and pound TKO in the first round.

=== UFC Lightweight Champion ===
==== Oliveira vs. Makhachev ====
Makhachev faced Charles Oliveira for the vacant UFC Lightweight Championship at UFC 280 on 22 October 2022. Makhachev won the bout and the title in the second round via arm-triangle choke after knocking down Oliveira with a punch. With this win, he received the Performance of the Night bonus.

In November 2022, Makhachev was awarded Order "For Merit to the Republic of Dagestan" for his achievement in martial arts.

==== Makhachev vs. Volkanovski ====
Makhachev defended his title against the UFC Featherweight Champion Alexander Volkanovski on 12 February 2023 at UFC 284. Makhachev won via a close unanimous decision. This fight earned him the Fight of the Night award. After his victory, Makhachev and his coach Muslim Amiraslanov were both awarded the Sali Suleiman medal, the Dagestan Ministry of Sports' highest award, named after a famous wrestler.

==== Makhachev vs. Volkanovski II ====
Makhachev was scheduled to make his second title defense in a rematch against Charles Oliveira on 21 October 2023, at UFC 294. However, Oliveira was forced off from the event due to injuries and he was replaced by Alexander Volkanovski. He subsequently won the rematch by head kick knockout in the first round. This fight earned him the Performance of the Night award.

==== Makhachev vs. Poirier ====
Makhachev faced former interim lightweight champion Dustin Poirier at UFC 302 on 1 June 2024. He won by a brabo choke submission at 2:42 of the fifth round. This fight earned him both the Performance of the Night and Fight of the Night awards totaling $100,000. After winning the fight, he also expressed his intentions to move up to welterweight and start his quest to become a two-division champion.

==== Makhachev vs. Moicano ====
Makhachev made his next title defense against Renato Moicano on 18 January 2025 at UFC 311. Makhachev was originally slated to defend the belt in a rematch against Arman Tsarukyan, but one day before the event, a back injury suffered by Tsarukyan forced him to withdraw from the bout; Moicano was originally scheduled to face Beneil Dariush at the event. He won the fight via a brabo choke submission in the first round.

=== UFC Welterweight Champion ===
==== Della Maddalena vs. Makhachev ====
In May 2025, it was announced that UFC 317 will be headlined for the vacant lightweight championship, hence Makhachev will move up to challenge for the UFC Welterweight Championship against current champion Jack Della Maddalena. On 28 August 2025, the bout was officially announced and took place on 15 November 2025 at UFC 322. Makhachev defeated Della Maddalena via unanimous decision to win the welterweight title.

==== Makhachev vs. Machado Garry ====
Makhachev made his first welterweight title defense against Ian Machado Garry on 15 August 2026 at UFC 330. He won the fight via unanimous decision. With this win, Makhachev set the new record for the longest winning streak in UFC history (17).

==== Cancelled bout ====
Makhachev was scheduled to face Carlos Prates on January 30, 2027 at UFC 336. However, Makhachev withdrew, stating that Prates and undefeated contender Michael Morales should fight to determine the true number one contender, leading to the creation of the interim title.

== Fighting style ==
Makhachev’s fighting style is built on a foundation of Sambo, which he began training in his youth under the same Dagestani system as Khabib Nurmagomedov. Like Nurmagomedov, he emphasizes positional control, chain wrestling, and relentless pressure on the ground, but Makhachev is considered by many to have a more methodical and technically refined approach. He frequently uses trips and body locks from the clinch, opting for efficiency over explosive takedowns.

On the ground, Makhachev prefers to wear opponents down with top pressure and gradual positional advances rather than immediate ground-and-pound. His submission game is particularly dangerous from the top, especially his arm-triangle choke, which he has used to finish several UFC opponents. Despite being known for his grappling, Makhachev has also developed a measured and increasingly effective striking game, often using feints and southpaw kicks to manage distance until he finds an opening for the clinch or takedown. His style blends control and patience, often forcing opponents into prolonged defensive positions where they struggle to mount offense.

== Personal life ==
As of January 2025, Makhachev is married and has three children: the oldest being a girl and two boys.

== Championships and accomplishments ==
- Republic of Dagestan
  - Order "For Merit to the Republic of Dagestan" (2022)
  - Sali Suleiman medal, Ministry of Physical Fitness and Sports of the Republic of Dagestan (2023)
  - Order of Honor of the Republic of Dagestan III Degree (2024)
  - Order of Merit for achievements in physical culture and sports in the Republic of Dagestan (2025)

=== Mixed martial arts ===
- Ultimate Fighting Championship
  - UFC Welterweight Championship (One time, current)
    - One successful title defense
    - Eleventh multi-division champion in UFC history
  - UFC Lightweight Championship (One time, former)
    - Four successful title defenses
      - Most UFC lightweight title wins (5)
      - Most consecutive UFC lightweight title defenses (4)
      - Most total UFC lightweight title defenses (4)
      - Tied (B.J. Penn) for most finishes in UFC Lightweight title fights (4)
      - Tied (Khabib Nurmagomedov) for most submissions in UFC Lightweight title fights (3)
  - Fight of the Night (Three times) vs. Arman Tsarukyan, Alexander Volkanovski 1 and Dustin Poirier
  - Performance of the Night (Three times) vs. Charles Oliveira, Alexander Volkanovski 2 and Dustin Poirier
  - Longest win streak in UFC history (17)
    - Longest win streak in UFC Lightweight division history (14)
  - Fifth fewest significant strikes absorbed per minute in UFC Lightweight division history (1.53)
  - Second highest significant strike accuracy in UFC Lightweight division history (59.5%)
  - Second highest takedown defense percentage in UFC Lightweight division history (90.9%)
  - Third highest win percentage in UFC history (94.7% - 18 wins / 1 loss)
  - Third most submissions in UFC Lightweight division history (8)
  - Third highest takedown defense percentage in UFC Lightweight division history (90.9%)
  - Fourth most top position time in UFC Lightweight division history (1:08:42)
  - Tied (Tony Ferguson, Donald Cerrone & Dustin Poirier) for fifth most finishes in UFC Lightweight division history (10)
  - Holds wins over four former UFC champions (3 undisputed) — vs. Charles Oliveira, Alexander Volkanovski (x2), Jack Della Maddalena and Dustin Poirier (interim)
  - UFC Men's Pound-For-Pound No. 1 in 2023–2026
  - UFC Honors Awards
    - 2022: Fan's Choice Submission of the Year Winner vs. Charles Oliveira
    - 2023: President's Choice Fight of the Year Winner vs. Alexander Volkanovski 1 & Fan's Choice Knockout of the Year Nominee vs. Alexander Volkanovski 2
    - 2024: Fan's Choice Submission of the Year Winner vs. Dustin Poirier
    - 2025: Fan's Choice Submission of the Year Winner vs. Renato Moicano
      - Winner of the most Honors Awards in UFC history (4)
  - UFC.com Awards
    - 2021: Ranked #5 Fighter of the Year & Ranked #7 Submission of the Year vs. Drew Dober
    - 2022: Ranked #3 Fighter of the Year & Ranked #4 Submission of the Year vs. Charles Oliveira
    - 2023: Fighter of the Year, Fight of the Year vs. Alexander Volkanovski 1 & Ranked #4 Knockout of the Year vs. Alexander Volkanovski 2
    - 2024: Half-Year Awards: Best Fight of the 1HY, Ranked #3 Submission of the Year & Ranked #4 Fight of the Year vs. Dustin Poirier
    - 2025: Ranked #3 Fighter of the Year
- MMA Junkie
  - 2021 March Submission of the Month vs. Drew Dober
  - 2021 October Submission of the Month vs. Dan Hooker
  - 2022 October Submission of the Month vs. Charles Oliveira
  - 2022 Submission of the year vs. Charles Oliveira
  - 2023 Fight of the Year vs. Alexander Volkanovski at UFC 284
- Sherdog
  - 2023 Fighter of the Year
  - 2023 Fight of the Year vs. Alexander Volkanovski at UFC 284
- World MMA Awards
  - 2023 Fight of the Year vs. Alexander Volkanovski at UFC 284
- Wrestling Observer Newsletter
  - 2023 Most Outstanding Fighter of the Year
  - 2023 MMA Match of the Year vs. Alexander Volkanovski at UFC 284
- ESPN
  - 2023 Male Fighter of the Year
  - 2023 Fight of the Year vs. Alexander Volkanovski at UFC 284
- The Sporting News
  - 2023 Fight of the Year vs. Alexander Volkanovski 1 at UFC 284
- MMA Mania
  - 2023 #2 Ranked Fighter of the Year
  - 2024 #4 Ranked Fight of the Year vs. Dustin Poirier at UFC 302
  - 2024 #2 Ranked Submission of the Year vs. Dustin Poirier at UFC 302
  - 2025 #4 Ranked Fighter of the Year
  - 2025 #2 Ranked Submission of the Year vs. Renato Moicano at UFC 311
- MMA Fighting
  - 2025 Fighter of the Year
  - 2025 Second Team MMA All-Star
- Fight Matrix
  - 2022 Most Noteworthy Match of the Year vs. Charles Oliveira at UFC 280
  - 2023 Male Fighter of the Year
  - 2023 Most Noteworthy Match of the Year vs. Alexander Volkanovski II at UFC 294
  - 2025 Male Fighter of the Year with Merab Dvalishvili
- Combat Press
  - 2025 Male Fighter of the Year
- Cageside Press
  - 2023 Fight of the Year vs. Alexander Volkanovski at UFC 284
  - 2024 Submission of the Year vs. Dustin Poirier at UFC 302
- theScore
  - 2025 Male Fighter of the Year
- CBS Sports
  - 2023 MMA Fighter of the Year
  - 2023 MMA Fight of the Year vs. Alexander Volkanovski
- Bleacher Report
  - 2023 UFC Fight of the Year vs. Alexander Volkanovski 1 at UFC 284
- GiveMeSport
  - 2023 UFC Fighter of the Year
  - 2023 UFC Fight of the Year vs. Alexander Volkanovski 1 at UFC 284
- Sportsnaut
  - 2023 UFC Fight of the Year vs. Alexander Volkanovski 1 at UFC 284
- Uncrowned
  - 2025 #2 Ranked Male Fighter of the Year

=== Sambo ===
- Fédération Internationale Amateur de Sambo (FIAS)
  - 2016 FIAS World Combat Sambo Championships Gold Medalist
- Combat Sambo Federation of Russia
  - Russian National Gold Medalist (2014, 2016 at -74 kg)

=== Grappling ===
- UWW Russian Grappling Federation
  - North Caucasian Federal District Gold Medalist

== Mixed martial arts record ==
Professional record breakdown
30 matches	29 wins	1 loss
By knockout	5	1
By submission	13	0
By decision	11	0

Res.	Record	Opponent	Method	Event	Date	Round	Time	Location	Notes
Win	29–1	Ian Machado Garry	Decision (unanimous)	UFC 330	15 August 2026	5	5:00	Philadelphia, Pennsylvania, United States	Defended the UFC Welterweight Championship. Broke the record for the longest win streak in UFC history (17).
Win	28–1	Jack Della Maddalena	Decision (unanimous)	UFC 322	15 November 2025	5	5:00	New York City, New York, United States	Welterweight debut. Won the UFC Welterweight Championship.
Win	27–1	Renato Moicano	Submission (brabo choke)	UFC 311	18 January 2025	1	4:05	Inglewood, California, United States	Defended the UFC Lightweight Championship. Broke the record for the most consecutive UFC Lightweight title defenses (4). Later vacated the title on 28 June 2025.
Win	26–1	Dustin Poirier	Submission (brabo choke)	UFC 302	1 June 2024	5	2:42	Newark, New Jersey, United States	Defended the UFC Lightweight Championship. Performance of the Night. Fight of the Night.
Win	25–1	Alexander Volkanovski	KO (head kick and punches)	UFC 294	21 October 2023	1	3:06	Abu Dhabi, United Arab Emirates	Defended the UFC Lightweight Championship. Performance of the Night.
Win	24–1	Alexander Volkanovski	Decision (unanimous)	UFC 284	12 February 2023	5	5:00	Perth, Australia	Defended the UFC Lightweight Championship. Fight of the Night.
Win	23–1	Charles Oliveira	Submission (arm-triangle choke)	UFC 280	22 October 2022	2	3:16	Abu Dhabi, United Arab Emirates	Won the vacant UFC Lightweight Championship. Performance of the Night.
Win	22–1	Bobby Green	TKO (punches)	UFC Fight Night: Makhachev vs. Green	26 February 2022	1	3:23	Las Vegas, Nevada, United States	Catchweight (160 lb) bout.
Win	21–1	Dan Hooker	Submission (kimura)	UFC 267	30 October 2021	1	2:25	Abu Dhabi, United Arab Emirates	
Win	20–1	Thiago Moisés	Submission (rear-naked choke)	UFC on ESPN: Makhachev vs. Moisés	17 July 2021	4	2:38	Las Vegas, Nevada, United States	
Win	19–1	Drew Dober	Submission (arm-triangle choke)	UFC 259	6 March 2021	3	1:37	Las Vegas, Nevada, United States	
Win	18–1	Davi Ramos	Decision (unanimous)	UFC 242	7 September 2019	3	5:00	Abu Dhabi, United Arab Emirates	
Win	17–1	Arman Tsarukyan	Decision (unanimous)	UFC Fight Night: Overeem vs. Oleinik	20 April 2019	3	5:00	Saint Petersburg, Russia	Fight of the Night.
Win	16–1	Kajan Johnson	Submission (armbar)	UFC on Fox: Alvarez vs. Poirier 2	28 July 2018	1	4:43	Calgary, Alberta, Canada	
Win	15–1	Gleison Tibau	KO (punch)	UFC 220	20 January 2018	1	0:57	Boston, Massachusetts, United States	
Win	14–1	Nik Lentz	Decision (unanimous)	UFC 208	11 February 2017	3	5:00	Brooklyn, New York, United States	
Win	13–1	Chris Wade	Decision (unanimous)	UFC Fight Night: Poirier vs. Johnson	17 September 2016	3	5:00	Hidalgo, Texas, United States	
Loss	12–1	Adriano Martins	KO (punch)	UFC 192	3 October 2015	1	1:46	Houston, Texas, United States	
Win	12–0	Leo Kuntz	Submission (rear-naked choke)	UFC 187	23 May 2015	2	2:38	Las Vegas, Nevada, United States	
Win	11–0	Ivica Trušček	Submission (inverted triangle choke)	M-1 Challenge 51	7 September 2014	3	4:45	Saint Petersburg, Russia	Catchweight (165 lb) bout.
Win	10–0	Yuri Ivlev	Submission (armbar)	M-1 Challenge 49	7 June 2014	1	3:10	Dzheyrakh, Russia	
Win	9–0	Rander Junio	Decision (unanimous)	M-1 Challenge 41	21 August 2013	3	5:00	Saint Petersburg, Russia	
Win	8–0	Mansour Barnaoui	Decision (unanimous)	M-1 Challenge 38	9 April 2013	3	5:00	Saint Petersburg, Russia	
Win	7–0	Anatoly Kormilkin	Submission (inverted triangle choke)	Lion's Fights 2	2 September 2012	1	3:17	Saint Petersburg, Russia	
Win	6–0	Migel Grigoryan	Submission (triangle choke)	Siberian FC 1	15 December 2011	1	4:25	Tomsk, Russia	
Win	5–0	Vladimir Egoyan	Decision (split)	ProFC 29	2 July 2011	2	5:00	Rostov-on-Don, Russia	
Win	4–0	Magomed Ibragimov	Submission (triangle choke)	Tsumada FC 5	1 July 2011	2	3:15	Agvali, Russia	
Win	3–0	Martiros Grigoryan	TKO (punches)	ProFC 28	6 May 2011	1	2:52	Simferopol, Ukraine	
Win	2–0	Tengiz Khuchua	KO (punch)	M-1: Selection Ukraine 2010	12 February 2011	1	0:30	Kyiv, Ukraine	
Win	1–0	Magomed Bekbolatov	Decision (unanimous)	Tsumada FC 4	1 August 2010	2	5:00	Agvali, Russia	Lightweight debut.

== Pay-per-view bouts ==
No.	Event	Fight	Date	Venue	City	PPV buys
1.	UFC 280	Oliveira vs. Makhachev	22 October 2022	Etihad Arena	Abu Dhabi, United Arab Emirates	Not Disclosed
2.	UFC 284	Makhachev vs. Volkanovski	12 February 2023	RAC Arena	Perth, Australia	Not Disclosed
3.	UFC 294	Makhachev vs. Volkanovski 2	21 October 2023	Etihad Arena	Abu Dhabi, United Arab Emirates	Not Disclosed
4.	UFC 302	Makhachev vs. Poirier	1 June 2024	Prudential Center	Newark, New Jersey, United States	Not Disclosed
5.	UFC 311	Makhachev vs. Moicano	18 January 2025	Intuit Dome	Inglewood, California, United States	Not Disclosed
6.	UFC 322	Della Maddalena vs. Makhachev	15 November 2025	Madison Square Garden	New York City, New York, United States	Not Disclosed

== See also ==
- Double champions in MMA
- List of current UFC fighters
- List of male mixed martial artists
- List of multi-sport athletes
- List of multi-sport champions

Achievements
Preceded by Charles Oliveira; Stripped	12th UFC Lightweight Champion; 22 October 2022 – 28 June 2025; Vacated	Vacant Title next held by Ilia Topuria
Preceded by Jack Della Maddalena	16th UFC Welterweight Champion; 15 November 2025 – present	Incumbent
Awards
Preceded by Jiří Procházka vs. Glover Teixeira	World MMA Fight of the Year; 2022–23 vs. Alexander Volkanovski at UFC 284	Succeeded by Max Holloway vs. Justin Gaethje
