= UFC Fight Night: Rodriguez vs. Lemos =

UFC mixed martial arts event in 2022

- The poster for UFC Fight Night: Rodriguez vs. Lemos
- Promotion: Ultimate Fighting Championship
- Date: November 5, 2022
- Venue: UFC Apex
- City: Enterprise, Nevada, United States
- Attendance: Not announced

Event chronology
UFC Fight Night: Kattar vs. Allen	UFC Fight Night: Rodriguez vs. Lemos	UFC 281: Adesanya vs. Pereira

UFC Fight Night: Rodriguez vs. Lemos (also known as UFC Fight Night 214, UFC on ESPN+ 72 and UFC Vegas 64) was a mixed martial arts event produced by the Ultimate Fighting Championship that took place on November 5, 2022 at the UFC Apex facility in Enterprise, Nevada, part of the Las Vegas Metropolitan Area, United States.

== Background ==
A featherweight bout between Bryce Mitchell and Movsar Evloev was expected to headline the event. However, Evloev withdrew in mid October due to injury and the bout was scrapped.

A women's strawweight bout between Marina Rodriguez and Amanda Lemos was originally expected to take place at UFC 280, but was postponed to this event for unknown reasons. After the original main event was cancelled, they were promoted to the headliner spot.

A women's flyweight bout between Miranda Maverick and Shanna Young took place at this event. The pair was previously scheduled for UFC 278, but the bout was cancelled on the day of the weigh-ins as Young was hospitalized due to weight cut issues.

Neil Magny and Daniel Rodriguez were scheduled to meet in a welterweight bout at UFC Fight Night: Grasso vs. Araújo in October 15, but Rodriguez withdrew due to an elbow infection. They were then rescheduled for this event.

Jailton Almeida and Maxim Grishin were previously scheduled to meet in a light heavyweight bout at UFC Fight Night: Holm vs. Vieira, but the latter pulled out due to undisclosed reasons back then. They were rebooked for this event in a catchweight of 220 pounds, after Almeida was in need of a new opponent as Shamil Abdurakhimov pulled out due to undisclosed reasons of their heavyweight bout at UFC 280. The bout was reportedly scrapped from this card on fight week due to undisclosed reasons.

At the weigh-ins, a record-tying four fighters missed weight:

- Grant Dawson weighed in at 157.5 pounds, one and a half pounds over the lightweight non-title fight limit.
- Benito Lopez weighed in at 138.5 pounds, two and a half pounds over the bantamweight non-title fight limit.
- Carlos Candelario weighed in at 127.5 pounds, one and a half pounds over the flyweight non-title fight limit.
- Ramona Pascual weighed in at 137 pounds, one pound over the bantamweight non-title limit.

All four bouts proceeded at catchweight. Dawson was fined 30% of his purse while Lopez, Candelario, and Pascual were fined 20% of their individual purses which went to their opponents Mark Madsen, Mario Bautista, Jake Hadley, and Tamires Vidal, respectively.

Josh Parisian was expected to face Chase Sherman in a heavyweight bout. However, he pulled out of the fight hours before it was scheduled to take place due to medical issues.

== Results ==
Main card (ESPN+)
Weight class				Method	Round	Time	Notes
Women's Strawweight	Amanda Lemos	def.	Marina Rodriguez	TKO (punches)	3	0:54
Welterweight	Neil Magny	def.	Daniel Rodriguez	Submission (D'Arce choke)	3	3:33
Featherweight	Shayilan Nuerdanbieke	def.	Darrick Minner	TKO (elbows)	1	1:07
Flyweight	Tagir Ulanbekov	def.	Nate Maness	Submission (guillotine choke)	1	2:11
Catchweight (157.5 lb)	Grant Dawson	def.	Mark Madsen	Submission (rear-naked choke)	3	2:05
Preliminary card (ESPN+)
Women's Flyweight	Miranda Maverick	def.	Shanna Young	Decision (unanimous) (30–26, 30–26, 30–26)	3	5:00
Catchweight (138.5 lb)	Mario Bautista	def.	Benito Lopez	Submission (reverse triangle armbar)	1	4:54
Women's Strawweight	Polyana Viana	def.	Jinh Yu Frey	KO (punches)	1	0:47
Bantamweight	Johnny Muñoz Jr.	def.	Liudvik Sholinian	Decision (unanimous) (30–27, 30–27, 29–28)	3	5:00
Catchweight (128.5 lb)	Jake Hadley	def.	Carlos Candelario	Submission (triangle choke)	2	2:39
Catchweight (137 lb)	Tamires Vidal	def.	Ramona Pascual	TKO (flying knee to the body)	1	3:06

== Bonus awards ==
The following fighters received $50,000 bonuses.

- Fight of the Night: No bonus awarded.
- Performance of the Night: Neil Magny, Mario Bautista, Polyana Viana, and Tamires Vidal

== James Krause betting controversy ==
Just before the event took place, the UFC was informed by sources that suspicious betting patterns had been observed for the fight between Darrick Minner and Shayilan Nuerdanbieke. Hours before the fight, Nuerdanbieke's odds to win moved significantly in his favor, thus causing the Nevada State Athletic Commission to open an investigation. Suspicion arose when Minner, coached by UFC veteran James Krause, threw a kick and showed signs of injury to his leg, kicking with that same leg once more before being finished by technical knockout seconds later. This caused many to speculate that Minner knowingly fought with an injury and purposely lost the fight, and that Krause, who had been very open about betting on fights, placed a bet on Nuerdanbieke. On November 18, the Nevada State Athletic Commission informed the UFC and Krause that Krause’s license was suspended and would remain so during the course of the investigation. The UFC also announced that any fighter who chose to continue to be coached by Krause or who continued to train in his gym would be banned from participating in future UFC events until the investigation concludes.

== See also ==
- List of UFC events
- List of current UFC fighters
- 2022 in UFC
