= UFC 274 =

Mixed martial arts event in 2022

UFC 274: Oliveira vs. Gaethje
- The poster for UFC 274: Oliveira vs. Gaethje
- Promotion: Ultimate Fighting Championship
- Date: May 7, 2022
- Venue: Footprint Center
- City: Phoenix, Arizona, United States
- Attendance: 17,232
- Total gate: $6,130,000
- Buyrate: 400,000 (US)

Event chronology
UFC on ESPN: Font vs. Vera	UFC 274: Oliveira vs. Gaethje	UFC on ESPN: Błachowicz vs. Rakić

UFC 274: Oliveira vs. Gaethje was a mixed martial arts event produced by the Ultimate Fighting Championship that took place on May 7, 2022, at the Footprint Center in Phoenix, Arizona, United States.

== Background ==
The event was originally linked to Rio de Janeiro, Brazil, but the promotion eventually decided to move the event from that location. It took place in Phoenix, Arizona. It was the city's first event since UFC on ESPN: Ngannou vs. Velasquez in February 2019.

A UFC Light Heavyweight Championship bout between current champion Glover Teixeira and former Rizin Light Heavyweight Champion Jiří Procházka was expected to take place at the event. However, the bout was pushed back to UFC 275 for undisclosed reasons.

A UFC Lightweight Championship bout between current champion Charles Oliveira and former interim champion Justin Gaethje (also former WSOF Lightweight Champion) headlined the event. At the weigh-ins, Oliveira weighed in at 155.5 pounds, half a pound over the title limit. As a result, upon commencement of the fight, Oliveira was stripped of the title and only Gaethje was eligible to win it.

A UFC Women's Strawweight Championship rematch between current two-time champion Rose Namajunas and former champion (also former Invicta FC Strawweight Champion) Carla Esparza took place at the event. The pairing previously met 7 and a half years prior at The Ultimate Fighter: A Champion Will Be Crowned Finale for the inaugural championship, which Esparza won via third round submission.

A lightweight bout between Joe Lauzon and former lightweight title challenger Donald Cerrone was scheduled for UFC on ESPN: Font vs. Vera. However, the bout was removed from this event. In turn, the bout was cancelled on the day of the event when Cerrone suffered from food poisoning.

Amanda Ribas and former Invicta FC Atomweight Champion Michelle Waterson were expected to meet at this event. They were originally expected to meet at UFC 257, but Waterson pulled out of the bout due to undisclosed reasons. They were then rescheduled for UFC Fight Night: Blaydes vs. Daukaus, but an injury forced Waterson out of the pairing once again. Waterson announced in early March that her injury could potentially be "career ending" and would not compete at this event.

A lightweight bout between Michael Johnson and Alan Patrick was expected to take place at the event. However, the bout was pushed back one week to UFC on ESPN: Błachowicz vs. Rakić for undisclosed reasons.

At the weigh-ins, Norma Dumont weighed in at 146.5 pounds, half a pound over the women's featherweight non-title fight limit. Her bout proceeded at catchweight and she was fined 30% of her individual purse, which went to her opponent The Ultimate Fighter: Heavy Hitters women's featherweight winner Macy Chiasson.

It was announced during the event's broadcast that former UFC Light Heavyweight and Heavyweight Champion Daniel Cormier will be inducted into the UFC Hall of Fame at this year's class.

This event had five split decision bouts tying UFC 222 for the most split decision bouts in UFC history.

== Results ==
Main card
Weight class				Method	Round	Time	Notes
Lightweight	Charles Oliveira (c)	def.	Justin Gaethje	Submission (rear-naked choke)	1	3:22	(Note: For the vacant UFC Lightweight Championship (only Gaethje was eligible).)
Women's Strawweight	Carla Esparza	def.	Rose Namajunas (c)	Decision (split) (47–48, 49–46, 48–47)	5	5:00	(Note: For the UFC Women's Strawweight Championship.)
Lightweight	Michael Chandler	def.	Tony Ferguson	KO (front kick)	2	0:17
Light Heavyweight	Ovince Saint Preux	def.	Maurício Rua	Decision (split) (28–29, 29–28, 30–27)	3	5:00
Welterweight	Randy Brown	def.	Khaos Williams	Decision (split) (29–28, 28–29, 29–28)	3	5:00
Preliminary card (ESPN / ESPN+)
Welterweight	Francisco Trinaldo	def.	Danny Roberts	Decision (unanimous) (29–28, 30–27, 30–26)	3	5:00
Catchweight (146.5 lb)	Macy Chiasson	def.	Norma Dumont	Decision (split) (30–27, 28–29, 30–27)	3	5:00
Flyweight	Brandon Royval	def.	Matt Schnell	Submission (guillotine choke)	1	2:14
Heavyweight	Blagoy Ivanov	def.	Marcos Rogério de Lima	Decision (unanimous) (29–28, 29–28, 29–28)	3	5:00
Early preliminary card (ESPN+ / UFC Fight Pass)
Welterweight	André Fialho	def.	Cameron VanCamp	KO (punch)	1	2:35
Women's Flyweight	Tracy Cortez	def.	Melissa Gatto	Decision (unanimous) (29–28, 29–28, 29–28)	3	5:00
Flyweight	C.J. Vergara	def.	Kleydson Rodrigues	Decision (split) (29–28, 28–29, 29–28)	3	5:00
Women's Strawweight	Lupita Godinez	def.	Ariane Carnelossi	Decision (unanimous) (30–27, 30–26, 30–26)	3	5:00
Bantamweight	Journey Newson	def.	Fernie Garcia	Decision (unanimous) (30–27, 30–27, 29–28)	3	5:00

== Bonus awards ==
The following fighters received $50,000 bonuses.

- Fight of the Night: Brandon Royval vs. Matt Schnell
- Performance of the Night: Michael Chandler and André Fialho

The following fighters received Crypto.com "Fan Bonus of the Night" awards paid in bitcoin of US$30,000 for first place, US$20,000 for second place, and US$10,000 for third place.

- First Place: Rose Namajunas
- Second Place: Michael Chandler
- Third Place: Charles Oliveira

== See also ==
- List of UFC events
- List of current UFC fighters
- 2022 in UFC
