= UFC 211 =

UFC mixed martial arts event in 2017

UFC 211: Miocic vs dos Santos 2
- The poster for UFC 211: Miocic vs dos Santos 2
- Promotion: Ultimate Fighting Championship
- Date: May 13, 2017
- Venue: American Airlines Center
- City: Dallas, Texas
- Attendance: 17,834
- Total gate: $2,662,645

Event chronology
UFC Fight Night: Swanson vs. Lobov	UFC 211: Miocic vs dos Santos 2	UFC Fight Night: Gustafsson vs. Teixeira

UFC 211: Miocic vs. dos Santos 2 was a mixed martial arts event produced by the Ultimate Fighting Championship held on May 13, 2017, at the American Airlines Center in Dallas, Texas.

== Background ==
The event was the fourth that the UFC has hosted in Dallas, following UFC 185 in March 2015, UFC 171 in March 2014, and UFC 103 in September 2009.

A UFC Heavyweight Championship bout between current champion Stipe Miocic and former champion Junior dos Santos served as the main event. The pairing met previously in December 2014 at UFC on Fox: dos Santos vs. Miocic, with dos Santos winning by a close unanimous decision.

In the co-featured slot, a UFC Women's Strawweight Championship bout between current champion Joanna Jędrzejczyk and Jéssica Andrade took place.

A heavyweight bout between former heavyweight champion Fabrício Werdum and Ben Rothwell was originally booked for UFC 203. However, Rothwell pulled out due to a knee injury. The fight was expected to take place at this event. The pairing was scrapped after Rothwell was flagged by USADA for a potential anti-doping violation.

A welterweight bout between former UFC Middleweight Championship challenger Demian Maia and Jorge Masvidal was originally targeted to headline UFC Fight Night: Swanson vs. Lobov. However, in late February, it was announced that the bout was moved to this event.

Jarjis Danho was expected to face promotional newcomer Dmitry Poberezhets at the event. However, Danho pulled out of the fight in mid-April citing an injury. He was replaced by Chase Sherman. In turn, Poberezhets was removed from the card for undisclosed reasons and was replaced by fellow newcomer Rashad Coulter.

The 2008 Olympic gold medalist in freestyle wrestling and former UFC Flyweight Championship challenger Henry Cejudo was expected to face Sergio Pettis at the event. However, on May 10, it was announced that Cejudo suffered a hand injury and the bout was canceled.

A featherweight bout between promotional newcomers, Jared Gordon and Michel Quiñones was expected for the event. However, Gordon pulled out of the fight on the day before the event due to stomach illness and as a result, Quiñones was removed from the card.

== Results ==
Main Card
Weight class				Method	Round	Time	Notes
Heavyweight	Stipe Miocic (c)	def.	Junior dos Santos	TKO (punches)	1	2:22	(Note: For the UFC Heavyweight Championship.)
Women's Strawweight	Joanna Jędrzejczyk (c)	def.	Jéssica Andrade	Decision (unanimous) (50–45, 50–44, 50–45)	5	5:00	(Note: For the UFC Women's Strawweight Championship.)
Welterweight	Demian Maia	def.	Jorge Masvidal	Decision (split) (29–28, 28–29, 29–28)	3	5:00	(Note: UFC Welterweight title eliminator)
Featherweight	Frankie Edgar	def.	Yair Rodríguez	TKO (doctor stoppage)	2	5:00
Middleweight	David Branch	def.	Krzysztof Jotko	Decision (split) (29–28, 28–29, 29–28)	3	5:00
Preliminary Card (FX)
Lightweight	Eddie Alvarez	vs.	Dustin Poirier	No Contest (illegal knees)	2	4:12	(Note: Alvarez landed illegal knees to Poirier's head, who was a downed opponent.)
Featherweight	Jason Knight	def.	Chas Skelly	TKO (punches)	3	0:39
Heavyweight	Chase Sherman	def.	Rashad Coulter	TKO (elbow)	2	3:36
Lightweight	James Vick	def.	Polo Reyes	TKO (punches)	1	2:39
Preliminary Card (UFC Fight Pass)
Women's Strawweight	Cortney Casey	def.	Jessica Aguilar	Decision (unanimous) (30–27, 30–27, 30–27)	3	5:00	(Note: The result was overturned after Casey tested positive for elevated testosterone levels, but the change was lifted as Casey's "B" sample was confirmed negative.)
Featherweight	Enrique Barzola	def.	Gabriel Benítez	Decision (unanimous) (29–28, 29–28, 29–28)	3	5:00
Light Heavyweight	Gadzhimurad Antigulov	def.	Joachim Christensen	Submission (rear-naked choke)	1	2:21

== Bonus awards ==
The following fighters were awarded $50,000 bonuses:

- Fight of the Night: Chase Sherman vs. Rashad Coulter
- Performance of the Night: Stipe Miocic and Jason Knight

== Aftermath ==
On May 26, it was announced that Casey tested positive for elevated levels of testosterone in an in-competition drug screen on May 13. Per the drug-test results, her testosterone-to-epitestosterone ratio was 5.4:1, above the 4:1 limit. Casey was suspended for three months and her win over Aguilar was overturned to a no-contest by the Texas Department of Licensing and Regulation (TDLR) due to the failure. Nearly a month later, Jeff Novitzky, the UFC's VP of athlete health and performance revealed that Casey's "B" sample came back negative for banned substances and synthetic testosterone, therefore clearing her of wrongdoing both by a WADA-accredited lab and a testing laboratory hired by the TDLR. Yet Casey's case remains "still under review" by the TDLR. Novitzky urged the TDLR to reverse its decision and cautioned the promotion could steer away future UFC events from Texas if the issue isn't resolved.

On June 30, the TDLR lifted Casey's three-month suspension and gave back her victory, which was overturned to a no contest.

== See also ==
- 2017 in UFC
- List of UFC events
