= Nik Lentz =

American mixed martial arts fighter

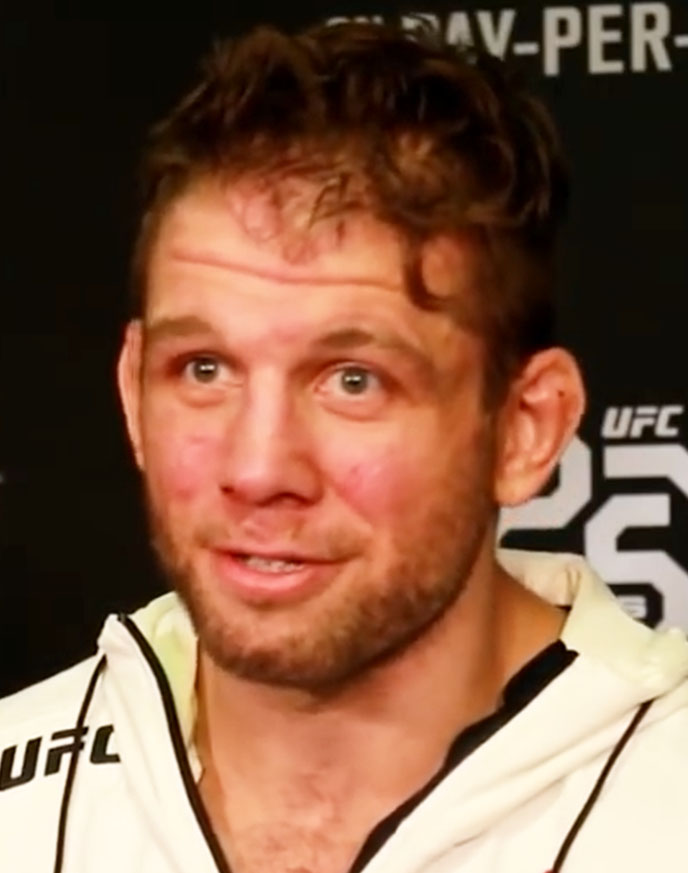
- Nik Lentz post fight interview at UFC 229 on Oct 6, 2018
- Born: Nik Lentz; August 13, 1984 (age 42); El Paso, Texas, U.S.
- Other names: The Carny
- Height: 5 ft 8 in (1.73 m)
- Weight: 156 lb (71 kg; 11 st 2 lb)
- Division: Welterweight; Lightweight; Featherweight
- Reach: 68 in (173 cm)
- Style: Wrestling
- Stance: Orthodox
- Fighting out of: Eden Prairie, Minnesota, U.S.
- Team: Minnesota Martial Arts Academy, American Top Team (2012–2017); Combat Club (2017–2021)
- Rank: Purple belt in Brazilian Jiu-Jitsu
- Wrestling: NCAA Division I Wrestling
- Years active: 2005–2021

Mixed martial arts record
- Total: 45
- Wins: 30
- By knockout: 11
- By submission: 8
- By decision: 11
- Losses: 12
- By knockout: 3
- By submission: 2
- By decision: 7
- Draws: 2
- No contests: 1

Other information
- Mixed martial arts record from Sherdog

Nik Lentz (born August 13, 1984) is an American retired mixed martial artist. He most notably fought for the Ultimate Fighting Championship, fighting in the lightweight division.

== Background ==
Lentz was born in El Paso, Texas but grew up in Twin Cities area of Minnesota, attending Bloomington Jefferson High School. In high school he wrestled, and was a state champion in Minnesota. After graduating in 2003, he was awarded a scholarship to wrestle for the University of Minnesota. In 2005, he started training in MMA. He trained in Chinese martial arts with Luis Quiroz, switched to Team Bison, and then switched to Minnesota Martial Arts Academy alongside former UFC Heavyweight Champion Brock Lesnar, former UFC Lightweight Champion Sean Sherk, and former Strikeforce and UFC middleweight Paul Bradley.

== Mixed martial arts career ==
=== Early career ===
Lentz made his professional debut in 2005 against Anthony White. The fight ended after Lentz knocked out White sometime during the first round. His next fight ended in the same way as the first with Lentz earning himself his second consecutive KO win. His third fight showed off Lentz's power in his hands after he forced his opponent to submit to punches.

Lentz went 4–0 after securing a rear naked choke submission win over Kenneth Allen. His first loss came out the hands of Sherron Leggett from a razor thin split decision. Lentz bounced back with a knock out win over Chris Powers. On a card held by Ultimate Combat Sports, Lentz submitted Jake Hoyer using a rear naked choke.

In August 2006, Lentz took his second loss from Brian Green who submitted him using an armbar in the first round. Lentz won his next three fights, all with first-round knockouts; one of the three was against Bellator lightweight, Carey Vanier.

Lentz had a grueling back-and-forth battle with Mark Moreno before the fight ended in disappointment when the cage-side doctors ruled Lentz unable to continue. After the loss to Moreno, Lentz went on to compile a 7–0–1 record in his next 8 fights including a victory over UFC veteran, Drew Fickett. He was then signed by the UFC and entered with a 16–3–1 record.

=== Ultimate Fighting Championship ===
In August 2009, it was announced Lentz had been signed with the UFC, and he would make his debut at UFC 103. He replaced an injured Dan Lauzon and upset Rafaello Oliveira, winning via unanimous decision with scores of 29–28, 29–28, and 30–27.

Again being the underdog, Lentz faced Thiago Tavares on January 11, 2010, at UFC Fight Night 20, with the fight ending in a rare majority draw.

Lentz moved his UFC record to 2–0–1 by defeating TUF 5 alum Rob Emerson on March 21, 2010, at UFC Fight Night 21, via unanimous decision.

In his fourth UFC appearance, Lentz defeated Andre Winner on August 28, 2010, at UFC 118 via unanimous decision (30–27 (twice) and 29–28). The match was shown on Spike TV before the Pay-Per-View event. Lentz scored multiple take-downs throughout the fight but was not able to capitalize on them. The fight was criticized for lack of action.

Lentz got a huge victory over Tyson Griffin on November 20, 2010, at UFC 123 via split decision.

At UFC Fight Night 24, Lentz fought and defeated division II national wrestling champion, Waylon Lowe. After Lowe won the first and second rounds convincingly, Lentz came back in the third and scored an impressive come from behind submission win.

Lentz faced Charles Oliveira on June 26, 2011, at UFC on Versus 4. The fight ended in the second round after Oliveira hit Lentz with an illegal knee which went unnoticed by the referee and submitted the dazed Lentz via rear naked choke. However, after reviewing the incident, the Pennsylvania State Athletic Commission overturned the result and declared it a no contest. The back and forth action earned both fighters Fight of the Night honors.

Lentz was defeated by Mark Bocek on December 10, 2011, at UFC 140 via unanimous decision. Lentz was taken down all three rounds and controlled despite threatening Bocek twice with a guillotine choke in rounds 1 and 2.

Lentz faced Evan Dunham on January 28, 2012, at UFC on Fox 2, where he replaced an injured Paul Sass. Lentz lost via TKO, due to doctor stoppage because of a large cut under his left eye. The fight earned both participants Fight of the Night honors.

Lentz made his featherweight debut against Eiji Mitsuoka on August 11, 2012, at UFC 150. Lentz controlled the entirety of the fight and won the fight via TKO in the first round.

In his second fight at featherweight, Lentz faced Diego Nunes on January 19, 2013, at UFC on FX 7. He won the fight via unanimous decision in what is arguably the biggest victory of his career.

Lentz went back to Brazil for the second fight in a row and faced Hacran Dias on May 18, 2013, at UFC on FX 8, replacing an injured Manvel Gamburyan. He won the back-and-forth fight via unanimous decision.

Lentz was briefly linked to a bout with Dennis Bermudez on November 6, 2013, at UFC Fight Night 31. However, Lentz was pulled from the pairing with Bermudez and instead faced Chad Mendes on December 14, 2013, at UFC on Fox 9. He lost the fight via unanimous decision.

Lentz faced Manvel Gamburyan on May 10, 2014, at UFC Fight Night 40. He won the fight via unanimous decision.

Lentz was expected to face Charles Oliveira in a rematch on September 5, 2014, at UFC Fight Night 50. At the event weigh in, Oliveira came in over the 146 pound featherweight limit at 150 pounds. Subsequently, he was initially forced to surrender 20 percent of his purse to Lentz and the bout was changed to a catchweight affair. Subsequently, Oliveira pulled out of the bout entirely after falling ill the day of the event.

Lentz was expected to face Thiago Tavares in a rematch on February 14, 2015, at UFC Fight Night 60. However, Tavares pulled out of the bout citing injury in late January and was replaced by promotional newcomer Levan Makashvili. Subsequently, for the second fight in a row, Lentz had a fight cancelled at the weigh ins as the pairing was scrapped as Lentz was stricken with flu-like symptoms.

Lentz finally faced Charles Oliveira in a rematch on May 30, 2015, at UFC Fight Night 67. Following a back-and-forth first two rounds, Lentz lost the fight via guillotine submission in the third round. Despite the loss, Lentz was awarded a Fight of the Night bonus award.

Lentz faced Danny Castillo in a lightweight bout on December 19, 2015, at UFC on Fox 17. He won the fight by split decision.

Lentz was expected to face Mairbek Taisumov on September 10, 2016, at UFC 203. However, Taisumov was removed from the event during the week before the event for alleged visa issues and was replaced by promotional newcomer Michael McBride. He won the fight via TKO in the first round.

Lentz faced Islam Makhachev on February 11, 2017, at UFC 208. He lost the fight by unanimous decision.

Lentz faced Will Brooks on October 7, 2017, at UFC 216. However the pairing was scrapped during the weigh-ins for the event, as Lentz was stricken with "medical issues" and deemed unfit to compete. The pairing with Brooks was rescheduled and took place on November 19, 2017, at UFC Fight Night 121. Lentz won the fight via submission in the second round. This win earned him the Performance of the Night bonus.

Lentz was expected to face Leonardo Santos on June 1, 2018, at UFC Fight Night 131. However, it was reported on April 28, 2018, that Santos was pulled from the event due to a hand injury. He was replaced by David Teymur. Lentz lost the fight via unanimous decision.

Lentz faced former title challenger Gray Maynard on October 6, 2018, at UFC 229. He won the fight via TKO in the second round after dropping Maynard with a head kick and following up with punches.

Lentz faced Scott Holtzman on February 17, 2019, at UFC on ESPN 1. He won the fight by unanimous decision.

A third fight with Charles Oliveira took place on May 18, 2019, at UFC Fight Night 152. He lost the fight via technical knockout in round two.

Lentz was expected to face Nad Narimani at UFC Fight Night 166 on January 25, 2020. However, the fight was scrapped due to injury and Lentz instead faced Arnold Allen, whose original opponent for the event had also dropped out. Lentz lost the fight via unanimous decision.

Lentz was expected to face Mike Grundy on January 16, 2021, at UFC on ABC 1. However, a member of Grundy's team tested positive for COVID-19, and Lentz instead faced Movsar Evloev on January 24, 2021, at UFC 257. Lentz lost the fight via split decision. 26 out of 26 media outlets scored the bout for Evloev.

After the loss, the next day Lentz announced his retirement, saying that it was due to him losing 40% of his vision after his fight with Arnold Allen, which required surgery.

== Personal life ==
Lentz and his wife have two daughters. Outside of UFC, Lentz works as a futures trader.

== Championships and accomplishments ==
=== Mixed martial arts ===
- Ultimate Fighting Championship
  - Fight of the Night (Three times) vs. Charles Oliveira 1 & 2 and Evan Dunham
  - Performance of the Night (One time) vs. Will Brooks

== Mixed martial arts record ==
Professional record breakdown
| 45 matches | 30 wins | 12 losses |
| By knockout | 11 | 3 |
| By submission | 8 | 2 |
| By decision | 11 | 7 |
| Draws | 2 | |
| No contests | 1 | |

| Res. | Record | Opponent | Method | Event | Date | Round | Time | Location | Notes |
|---|---|---|---|---|---|---|---|---|---|
| Loss | 30–12–2 (1) | Movsar Evloev | Decision (split) | UFC 257 | January 24, 2021 | 3 | 5:00 | Abu Dhabi, United Arab Emirates | Catchweight (150 lb) bout. |
| Loss | 30–11–2 (1) | Arnold Allen | Decision (unanimous) | UFC Fight Night: Blaydes vs. dos Santos | January 25, 2020 | 3 | 5:00 | Raleigh, North Carolina, United States | Return to Featherweight. |
| Loss | 30–10–2 (1) | Charles Oliveira | TKO (punches) | UFC Fight Night: dos Anjos vs. Lee | May 18, 2019 | 2 | 2:11 | Rochester, New York, United States | |
| Win | 30–9–2 (1) | Scott Holtzman | Decision (unanimous) | UFC on ESPN: Ngannou vs. Velasquez | February 17, 2019 | 3 | 5:00 | Phoenix, Arizona, United States | |
| Win | 29–9–2 (1) | Gray Maynard | TKO (head kick and punches) | UFC 229 | October 6, 2018 | 2 | 1:19 | Las Vegas, Nevada, United States | |
| Loss | 28–9–2 (1) | David Teymur | Decision (unanimous) | UFC Fight Night: Rivera vs. Moraes | June 1, 2018 | 3 | 5:00 | Utica, New York, United States | |
| Win | 28–8–2 (1) | Will Brooks | Submission (guillotine choke) | UFC Fight Night: Werdum vs. Tybura | November 19, 2017 | 2 | 2:05 | Sydney, Australia | Performance of the Night. |
| Loss | 27–8–2 (1) | Islam Makhachev | Decision (unanimous) | UFC 208 | February 11, 2017 | 3 | 5:00 | Brooklyn, New York, United States | |
| Win | 27–7–2 (1) | Michael McBride | TKO (punches) | UFC 203 | September 10, 2016 | 2 | 4:17 | Cleveland, Ohio, United States | Catchweight (158 lb) bout; McBride missed weight. |
| Win | 26–7–2 (1) | Danny Castillo | Decision (split) | UFC on Fox: dos Anjos vs. Cowboy 2 | December 19, 2015 | 3 | 5:00 | Orlando, Florida, United States | Return to Lightweight. |
| Loss | 25–7–2 (1) | Charles Oliveira | Submission (guillotine choke) | UFC Fight Night: Condit vs. Alves | May 30, 2015 | 3 | 1:10 | Goiânia, Brazil | Fight of the Night. |
| Win | 25–6–2 (1) | Manvel Gamburyan | Decision (unanimous) | UFC Fight Night: Brown vs. Silva | May 10, 2014 | 3 | 5:00 | Cincinnati, Ohio, United States | |
| Loss | 24–6–2 (1) | Chad Mendes | Decision (unanimous) | UFC on Fox: Johnson vs. Benavidez 2 | December 14, 2013 | 3 | 5:00 | Sacramento, California, United States | |
| Win | 24–5–2 (1) | Hacran Dias | Decision (unanimous) | UFC on FX: Belfort vs. Rockhold | May 18, 2013 | 3 | 5:00 | Jaraguá do Sul, Brazil | |
| Win | 23–5–2 (1) | Diego Nunes | Decision (unanimous) | UFC on FX: Belfort vs. Bisping | January 19, 2013 | 3 | 5:00 | São Paulo, Brazil | |
| Win | 22–5–2 (1) | Eiji Mitsuoka | TKO (punches) | UFC 150 | August 11, 2012 | 1 | 3:45 | Denver, Colorado, United States | Featherweight debut. |
| Loss | 21–5–2 (1) | Evan Dunham | TKO (doctor stoppage) | UFC on Fox: Evans vs. Davis | January 28, 2012 | 2 | 5:00 | Chicago, Illinois, United States | Fight of the Night. |
| Loss | 21–4–2 (1) | Mark Bocek | Decision (unanimous) | UFC 140 | December 10, 2011 | 3 | 5:00 | Toronto, Ontario, Canada | |
| NC | 21–3–2 (1) | Charles Oliveira | NC (overturned) | UFC Live: Kongo vs. Barry | June 26, 2011 | 2 | 1:48 | Pittsburgh, Pennsylvania, United States | Fight of the Night. Originally a submission (rear-naked choke) win for Oliveira; overturned due to an illegal knee landed by Oliveira. |
| Win | 21–3–2 | Waylon Lowe | Submission (guillotine choke) | UFC Fight Night: Nogueira vs. Davis | March 26, 2011 | 3 | 2:24 | Seattle, Washington, United States | |
| Win | 20–3–2 | Tyson Griffin | Decision (split) | UFC 123 | November 20, 2010 | 3 | 5:00 | Auburn Hills, Michigan, United States | |
| Win | 19–3–2 | Andre Winner | Decision (unanimous) | UFC 118 | August 28, 2010 | 3 | 5:00 | Boston, Massachusetts, United States | |
| Win | 18–3–2 | Rob Emerson | Decision (unanimous) | UFC Fight Night: Florian vs. Gomi | March 31, 2010 | 3 | 5:00 | Charlotte, North Carolina, United States | |
| Draw | 17–3–2 | Thiago Tavares | Draw (majority) | UFC Fight Night: Maynard vs. Diaz | January 11, 2010 | 3 | 5:00 | Fairfax, Virginia, United States | Tavares was deducted 1 point due to a groin kick. |
| Win | 17–3–1 | Rafaello Oliveira | Decision (unanimous) | UFC 103 | September 19, 2009 | 3 | 5:00 | Dallas, Texas, United States | |
| Win | 16–3–1 | Nick Walker | TKO (punches) | EC 127: Extreme Challenge 127 | May 30, 2009 | 1 | 2:15 | Rochester, Minnesota, United States | |
| Win | 15–3–1 | Drew Fickett | Decision (unanimous) | EB: Beatdown at 4 Bears | March 21, 2009 | 3 | 5:00 | New Town, North Dakota, United States | Welterweight bout. |
| Win | 14–3–1 | Sam Rouch | Decision (unanimous) | SNMMA: Beatdown 4 at Bears | October 11, 2008 | 3 | 5:00 | New Town, North Dakota, United States | |
| Win | 13–3–1 | Dan Loman | Submission (guillotine choke) | Brutaal Fight Night | September 5, 2008 | 1 | 4:13 | Maplewood, Minnesota, United States | |
| Win | 12–3–1 | Travis Pierzinski | Submission (rear-naked choke) | Brutaal Fight Night | May 21, 2008 | 2 | 3:45 | Maplewood, Minnesota, United States | |
| Win | 11–3–1 | Scott Bickerstaff | TKO (punches) | Xtreme Fighting Organization 22 | February 23, 2008 | 1 | 3:49 | Crystal Lake, Illinois, United States | |
| Draw | 10–3–1 | Kyle Jensen | Draw | CFX 7: Brutal | November 29, 2007 | 3 | 5:00 | St. Cloud, Minnesota, United States | |
| Win | 10–3 | Gabe Wallbridge | Submission (rear-naked choke) | EFX: Myth in Maplewood | September 19, 2007 | 1 | N/A | Maplewood, Minnesota, United States | |
| Loss | 9–3 | Mark Moreno | TKO (doctor stoppage) | X-1: Extreme Fighting 2 | March 17, 2007 | 1 | 5:00 | Honolulu, Hawaii, United States | |
| Win | 9–2 | Duran Barlow | TKO (submission to punches) | EFX: Fury | December 7, 2006 | 1 | N/A | Minneapolis, Minnesota, United States | |
| Win | 8–2 | Vern Jefferson | TKO (punches) | EFX | September 6, 2006 | 1 | N/A | Minneapolis, Minnesota, United States | |
| Win | 7–2 | Carey Vanier | TKO (punches) | EFX | September 6, 2006 | 1 | N/A | Minneapolis, Minnesota, United States | |
| Loss | 6–2 | Brian Green | Submission (armbar) | EFX | August 2, 2006 | 1 | N/A | Minneapolis, Minnesota, United States | Welterweight bout. |
| Win | 6–1 | Chris Powers | Submission (rear-naked choke) | EFX: Fury | July 24, 2006 | 1 | 1:44 | Andover, Minnesota, United States | |
| Loss | 5–1 | Sherron Leggett | Decision (split) | Twin Cities Throwdown | April 8, 2006 | 3 | 5:00 | Burnsville, Minnesota, United States | |
| Win | 5–0 | Kenneth Allen | Submission (rear-naked choke) | EFX: Fury | February 1, 2006 | 2 | N/A | Burnsville, Minnesota, United States | |
| Win | 4–0 | Derek Abram | TKO (submission to punches) | EFX | December 5, 2005 | 1 | N/A | Minneapolis, Minnesota, United States | |
| Win | 3–0 | Nick Melton | TKO (punches) | XKK: Lamar | October 10, 2005 | 1 | N/A | Fort Dodge, Iowa, United States | |
| Win | 2–0 | Anthony White | TKO (submission to punches) | XKK: Trials | August 27, 2005 | 1 | N/A | Des Moines, Iowa, United States | |
| Win | 1–0 | Jake Hoyer | Submission (rear-naked choke) | UCS - Throwdown at the T-Bar | July 30, 2005 | 1 | N/A | Ellsworth, Minnesota, United States | |

== See also ==
- List of male mixed martial artists
