= Scott Holtzman =

American mixed martial arts fighter

- Born: September 30, 1983 (age 43); Knoxville, Tennessee, U.S.
- Other names: Hot Sauce
- Height: 5 ft 9 in (1.75 m)
- Weight: 156 lb (71 kg; 11.1 st)
- Division: Lightweight
- Reach: 70 in (178 cm)
- Fighting out of: Knoxville, Tennessee, U.S.
- Team: Shield Systems; MMA Lab
- Rank: Black belt in Brazilian Jiu-Jitsu under Ben Harrison
- Years active: 2012–2022

Mixed martial arts record
- Total: 20
- Wins: 14
- By knockout: 5
- By submission: 2
- By decision: 7
- Losses: 6
- By knockout: 2
- By decision: 4

Amateur record
- Total: 4
- Wins: 4
- By knockout: 1
- By submission: 3

Other information
- University: University of Tennessee, Hiwassee College
- Website: https://www.ufc.com/athlete/scott-holtzman
- Mixed martial arts record from Sherdog

Scott Holtzman (born September 30, 1983) is an American former mixed martial artist, who most recently competed in the lightweight division of the Ultimate Fighting Championship. A professional from 2012 to 2022, he formerly competed for the Xtreme Fighting Championships, where he was the Lightweight Champion.

== Background ==
Holtzman was born in Knoxville, Tennessee and spent his childhood in Fountain City. He attended Central High School, where he played football and baseball. During high school, he also played ice hockey with the Knoxville Amateur Hockey Association. After high school, Holtzman attended Hiwassee College, where he played baseball and earned an associate degree in Business Administration. He transferred from Hiwassee to the University of Tennessee, where he played club hockey and earned a bachelor's degree in sociology. In 2008–09, Holtzman enjoyed a brief stint playing for the Knoxville Ice Bears.

== Mixed martial arts career ==
Holtzman began his professional mixed martial arts career in 2009. He compiled an undefeated amateur record of 4–0, with his final match earning him a contract with the Xtreme Fighting Championships (XFC). In his professional debut, Holtzman defeated Brandon Demastes by rear-naked choke at XFC16: High Stakes in front of a home crowd in Knoxville, Tennessee. He would decidedly win his next two fights against Matt Metts (XFC 18: Music City Mayhem) and Chris Coggins (XFC 20: High Octane) each in the first round by KO/TKO stoppage respectively.

=== XFC Lightweight Title ===
Holtzman opened up 2013 with a win by unanimous decision against Jason Hicks in a title eliminating match at XFC 22: Crossing The Line. After his match with Hicks, Holtzman was expected to face, then XFC Lightweight champion, Nick Newell for the Lightweight belt. In May 2013, it was reported that Newell had refused to fight Holtzman. According to XFC president, John Prisco, Newell was hoping to face former UFC fighters in order to make his claim to move up into the UFC. Prisco, however, felt that Holtzman had "earned the right" to face Newell for the title. Since Newell refused to fight Holtzman, Prisco stripped Newell of his belt and paired Holtzman against John Mahlow to compete for the vacated Lightweight belt at XFC 24: Collision Course. On June 14, 2013, Holtzman beat Mahlow by TKO (punches) in the second round to win the XFC Lightweight Title.

Holtzman quickly had the opportunity to defend his title at XFC 26: Night of Champions III, where he won by unanimous decision against Roger Carroll. After a hiatus due in part to a lack of reputable opponents and the XFC's focus on their new international partnerships, Holtzman secured a fight outside of the XFC against George Sheppard at the Premier Fighting Championships (PFC) 9: Unstoppable. Holtzman would go on to win by unanimous decision.

=== Ultimate Fighting Championship ===
On August 14, 2014, Holtzman announced that he had signed a four-fight deal with the UFC.

Holtzman made his promotional debut against Anthony Christodoulou on August 8, 2015, at UFC Fight Night 73. He won the one-sided fight via submission in the third round.

In his second fight for the promotion, Holtzman faced Drew Dober on January 2, 2016, at UFC 195. He lost the fight by unanimous decision.

Holtzman next faced Cody Pfister on July 13, 2016, at UFC Fight Night 91, and won the fight via unanimous decision.

Holtzman faced Josh Emmett on December 17, 2016, at UFC on Fox 22. He lost the fight by unanimous decision.

Holtzman next faced Michael McBride April 22, 2017 at UFC Fight Night 108. He won the fight via unanimous decision.

Holtzman faced Darrell Horcher on December 9, 2017, at UFC Fight Night 123. He won the fight by unanimous decision.

On January 25, 2018, Holtzman announced that he had signed a new, four-fight deal with UFC.

Holtzman faced Alan Patrick on October 6, 2018, at UFC 229. He won the fight via knockout in the third round after dropping Patrick with a punch and eventually finishing the fight with elbows.

Holtzman faced Nik Lentz on February 17, 2019, at UFC on ESPN 1. He lost the fight by unanimous decision.

Holtzman faced Dong Hyun Ma on August 3, 2019, at UFC on ESPN 5. He won the fight via TKO due to a doctor stoppage between the second and third round as the swelling on Ma's right eye rendered him unable to continue.

Holtzman faced Jim Miller on February 15, 2020, at UFC Fight Night 167. He won the back-and-forth fight by unanimous decision. The bout also earned Holtzman his first Fight of the Night bonus award.

Holtzman faced Beneil Dariush on August 8, 2020, at UFC Fight Night 174. He lost the fight via knockout in round one.

Hotzman faced Mateusz Gamrot on April 10, 2021, at UFC on ABC 2. He lost the bout via knockout in the second round.

Hotzman faced Clay Guida on December 3, 2022, at UFC on ESPN 42. He lost the fight via split decision and Hotzman retired after the loss.

== Championships and achievements ==
- Ultimate Fighting Championship
  - Fight of the Night (One time) vs. Jim Miller
- Xtreme Fighting Championships
  - XFC Lightweight Championship (One time; former)
- AXS TV Fights
  - 2013 AXS TV Fighter of the Year

== Mixed martial arts record ==
Professional record breakdown
| 20 matches | 14 wins | 6 losses |
| By knockout | 5 | 2 |
| By submission | 2 | 0 |
| By decision | 7 | 4 |

| Res. | Record | Opponent | Method | Event | Date | Round | Time | Location | Notes |
|---|---|---|---|---|---|---|---|---|---|
| Loss | 14–6 | Clay Guida | Decision (split) | UFC on ESPN: Thompson vs. Holland | December 3, 2022 | 3 | 5:00 | Orlando, Florida, United States | |
| Loss | 14–5 | Mateusz Gamrot | KO (punches) | UFC on ABC: Vettori vs. Holland | April 10, 2021 | 2 | 1:22 | Las Vegas, Nevada, United States | |
| Loss | 14–4 | Beneil Dariush | KO (spinning backfist) | UFC Fight Night: Lewis vs. Oleinik | August 8, 2020 | 1 | 4:38 | Las Vegas, Nevada, United States | Catchweight (158 lb) bout; Dariush missed weight. |
| Win | 14–3 | Jim Miller | Decision (unanimous) | UFC Fight Night: Anderson vs. Błachowicz 2 | February 15, 2020 | 3 | 5:00 | Rio Rancho, New Mexico, United States | Fight of the Night. |
| Win | 13–3 | Dong Hyun Ma | TKO (doctor stoppage) | UFC on ESPN: Covington vs. Lawler | August 3, 2019 | 2 | 5:00 | Newark, New Jersey, United States | Catchweight (158 lb) bout; Ma missed weight. |
| Loss | 12–3 | Nik Lentz | Decision (unanimous) | UFC on ESPN: Ngannou vs. Velasquez | February 17, 2019 | 3 | 5:00 | Phoenix, Arizona, United States | |
| Win | 12–2 | Alan Patrick | KO (elbows) | UFC 229 | October 6, 2018 | 3 | 3:42 | Las Vegas, Nevada, United States | |
| Win | 11–2 | Darrell Horcher | Decision (unanimous) | UFC Fight Night: Swanson vs. Ortega | December 9, 2017 | 3 | 5:00 | Fresno, California, United States | |
| Win | 10–2 | Michael McBride | Decision (unanimous) | UFC Fight Night: Swanson vs. Lobov | April 22, 2017 | 3 | 5:00 | Nashville, Tennessee, United States | |
| Loss | 9–2 | Josh Emmett | Decision (unanimous) | UFC on Fox: VanZant vs. Waterson | December 17, 2016 | 3 | 5:00 | Sacramento, California, United States | |
| Win | 9–1 | Cody Pfister | Decision (unanimous) | UFC Fight Night: McDonald vs. Lineker | July 13, 2016 | 3 | 5:00 | Sioux Falls, South Dakota, United States | |
| Loss | 8–1 | Drew Dober | Decision (unanimous) | UFC 195 | January 2, 2016 | 3 | 5:00 | Las Vegas, Nevada, United States | |
| Win | 8–0 | Anthony Christodoulou | Submission (rear-naked choke) | UFC Fight Night: Teixeira vs. Saint Preux | August 8, 2015 | 3 | 2:40 | Nashville, Tennessee, United States | |
| Win | 7–0 | George Sheppard | Decision (unanimous) | PFC: Premier Fighting Challenge 9 | April 5, 2014 | 3 | 5:00 | Abingdon, Virginia, United States | |
| Win | 6–0 | Roger Carroll | Decision (unanimous) | XFC 26 | October 18, 2013 | 5 | 5:00 | Nashville, Tennessee, United States | Defended the XFC Lightweight Championship. |
| Win | 5–0 | John Mahlow | TKO (punches) | XFC 24 | June 14, 2013 | 2 | 2:53 | Tampa, Florida, United States | Won the vacant XFC Lightweight Championship. |
| Win | 4–0 | Jason Hicks | Decision (unanimous) | XFC 22 | February 22, 2013 | 3 | 5:00 | Charlotte, North Carolina, United States | |
| Win | 3–0 | Chris Coggins | TKO (punches) | XFC 20 | September 28, 2012 | 1 | 4:46 | Dallas, Texas, United States | |
| Win | 2–0 | Matt Metts | KO (punches) | XFC 18 | June 22, 2012 | 1 | 4:13 | Nashville, Tennessee, United States | |
| Win | 1–0 | Brandon Demastes | Submission (rear-naked choke) | XFC 16 | February 10, 2012 | 2 | 1:44 | Knoxville, Tennessee, United States | Lightweight debut. |
