= UFC Fight Night: Swanson vs. Lobov =

UFC mixed martial arts event in 2017

- The poster for UFC Fight Night: Swanson vs. Lobov
- Promotion: Ultimate Fighting Championship
- Date: April 22, 2017
- Venue: Bridgestone Arena
- City: Nashville, Tennessee
- Attendance: 10,144
- Total gate: $755,180

Event chronology
UFC on Fox: Johnson vs. Reis	UFC Fight Night: Swanson vs. Lobov	UFC 211: Miocic vs. dos Santos 2

UFC Fight Night: Swanson vs. Lobov (also known as UFC Fight Night 108) was a mixed martial arts event produced by the Ultimate Fighting Championship held on April 22, 2017, at Bridgestone Arena in Nashville, Tennessee.

== Background ==
A featherweight bout between Cub Swanson and Artem Lobov headlined the event.

A welterweight bout between former UFC Middleweight Championship challenger Demian Maia and future UFC Welterweight Championship challengerJorge Masvidal was initially targeted to headline this event. However it was moved to UFC 211.

At the weigh-ins, Marcos Rogério de Lima came in at 210 lb, four pounds over the light heavyweight limit of 206 lb. As a result, he was fined 30% of his purse, which will go to his opponent Ovince Saint Preux and the bout proceeded at a catchweight.

== Results ==
Main Card (Fox Sports 1)
Weight class				Method	Round	Time	Notes
Featherweight	Cub Swanson	def.	Artem Lobov	Decision (unanimous) (49–46, 49–46, 50–45)	5	5:00
Lightweight	Al Iaquinta	def.	Diego Sanchez	KO (punches)	1	1:38
Catchweight (210 lb)	Ovince Saint Preux	def.	Marcos Rogério de Lima	Submission (Von Flue choke)	2	2:11
Bantamweight	John Dodson	def.	Eddie Wineland	Decision (unanimous) (29–28, 30–27, 30–27)	3	5:00
Lightweight	Stevie Ray	def.	Joe Lauzon	Decision (majority) (28–27, 29–27, 28–28)	3	5:00
Welterweight	Mike Perry	def.	Jake Ellenberger	KO (elbow)	2	1:05
Preliminary Card (Fox Sports 2)
Middleweight	Thales Leites	def.	Sam Alvey	Decision (unanimous) (30–27, 30–27, 30–27)	3	5:00
Flyweight	Brandon Moreno	def.	Dustin Ortiz	Technical Submission (rear-naked choke)	2	4:06
Lightweight	Scott Holtzman	def.	Michael McBride	Decision (unanimous) (30–27, 30–27, 30–26)	3	5:00
Women's Strawweight	Danielle Taylor	def.	Jessica Penne	Decision (unanimous) (29–28, 29–28, 29–28)	3	5:00
Preliminary Card (UFC Fight Pass)
Women's Bantamweight	Alexis Davis	def.	Cindy Dandois	Decision (unanimous) (29–28, 29–28, 29–28)	3	5:00
Welterweight	Bryan Barberena	def.	Joe Proctor	TKO (knees and punches)	1	3:30
Flyweight	Hector Sandoval	def.	Matt Schnell	KO (punches)	1	4:24

== Bonus awards ==
The following fighters were awarded $50,000 bonuses:

- Fight of the Night: Cub Swanson vs. Artem Lobov
- Performance of the Night: Mike Perry and Brandon Moreno

== See also ==
- List of UFC events
- 2017 in UFC
