= Stipe Miocic =

American mixed martial artist (born 1982)

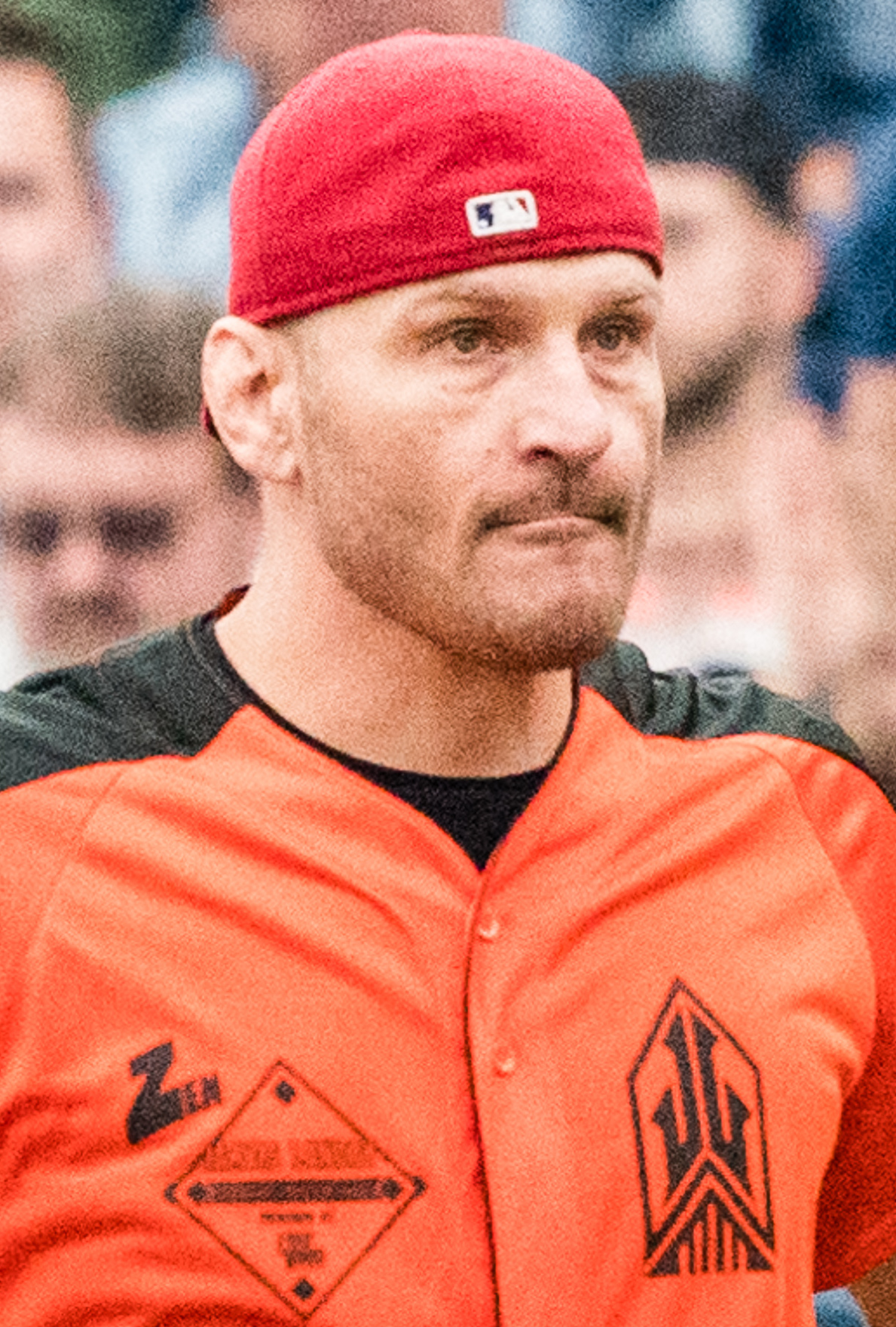
- Miocic in 2019
- Born: August 19, 1982 (age 44); Euclid, Ohio, U.S.
- Citizenship: United States; Croatia
- Height: 6 ft 4 in (193 cm)
- Weight: 249 lb (113 kg; 17 st 11 lb)
- Division: Heavyweight
- Reach: 80 in (203 cm)
- Stance: Orthodox
- Fighting out of: Independence, Ohio, U.S.
- Team: Strong Style Fight Team
- Trainer: Marcus Marinelli
- Rank: Purple belt in Brazilian jiu-jitsu
- Wrestling: NCAA Division I Wrestling
- Years active: 2010–2024

Mixed martial arts record
- Total: 25
- Wins: 20
- By knockout: 15
- By decision: 5
- Losses: 5
- By knockout: 4
- By decision: 1

Amateur record
- Total: 5
- Wins: 5
- By knockout: 5

Other information
- Occupation: Firefighter
- University: Cleveland State University; AMA University; Trevecca Nazarene University; Coker College
- Website: stipemiocic.com
- Mixed martial arts record from Sherdog
Medal record
Men's amateur boxing
Cleveland Golden Gloves
| Gold medal – first place | 2009 Euclid | Super Heavyweight |

YouTube information
- Channel: Stipe Miocic

Stipe Miocic (born August 19, 1982) is an American former professional mixed martial artist who competed in the Heavyweight division of the Ultimate Fighting Championship (UFC), where he is a former two-time UFC Heavyweight Champion. He is widely regarded as the greatest UFC heavyweight of all time.

Across two reigns as UFC Heavyweight Champion, Miocic successfully defended the title four times, holding the divisional records for the most heavyweight title-fight wins and the longest consecutive title defense streak, with three. He also holds the heavyweight record for fight-night bonus awards, with nine. Fight Matrix currently ranks him as the second-greatest heavyweight fighter of all time and the 17th-greatest fighter pound-for-pound.

Prior to his MMA career, Miocic was a Cleveland Golden Gloves boxing champion and NCAA Division I wrestler at Cleveland State University.

== Early life ==
He was born in Euclid, Ohio, on August 19, 1982, as the son of Croatian immigrants Kathy and Bojan Miocic and was raised there. (Croatian: Miočić, pronounced [mîotʃitɕ];). His father originates from Rtina, while his mother is from Cetingrad, Croatia. His parents separated when he was still a child and he continued to live with his mother, initially with grandparents, and later lived with his stepfather and younger half-brother Jonathan.

Since childhood, his mother encouraged his involvement in sports. Miocic played baseball and American football and wrestled while at Eastlake North High School. He received interest from Major League Baseball teams during his collegiate years at Cleveland State University and Trevecca Nazarene University. He also played Division II baseball at Coker College his junior year of college.

While wrestling in the 197 lbs weight class for Cleveland State Vikings, Miocic competed in the 2003 NCAA Division I Wrestling Championships in Kansas City.

As a member of Jeff Forehand's baseball team at Trevecca Nazarene, he hit .344 with seven home runs in his senior year and helped the Trojans win the 2005 TranSouth Athletic Conference regular season and tournament titles. He graduated from Trevecca Nazarene University. He majored in marketing and communications at CSU.

== Mixed martial arts career ==
=== Amateur career ===
In 2005, Miocic was invited to serve as a training partner for Dan Bobish at Strong Style MMA Training Centre, reportedly turning heads in the process. At the time, he was competing in multiple sports, including wrestling and baseball, and later returned to train after completing his paramedic education at Cuyahoga Community College. He initially focused on mixed martial arts but soon changed to boxing. His coach, Marcus Marinelli, recalled that despite training for only a few months, he was already defeating boxers with significantly more experience. In MMA, he quickly compiled a 5–0 amateur record, with all five victories coming by first-round stoppage, before deciding to pursue amateur boxing. He won the 2009 Cleveland Golden Gloves in the super heavyweight division, having earlier defeated defending champion Wesley Tripplett by second-round referee stoppage. He also competed at the National Golden Gloves that same year, winning his first two bouts before losing to future world title contender Bryant Jennings in the quarterfinals. His record in Golden Gloves boxing matches stands 4–1, with 2 victories by knockout.

=== Early career ===
After only eight months of training with a background of being a Cleveland Golden Gloves boxing champion and NCAA Division I wrestler at Cleveland State, Miocic began his professional MMA career by winning his first six fights by knockout. He initially fought for NAAFS (an Ohio-based MMA promotion), where he won the NAAFS Heavyweight Championship.

=== Ultimate Fighting Championship ===
On June 14, 2011, it was announced that Miocic had signed a multi-fight deal with the UFC.

Miocic made his UFC debut against Joey Beltran on October 8, 2011, at UFC 136 and won the fight via unanimous decision (29–28, 30–27, and 29–28).

Miocic faced Phil De Fries on February 15, 2012, at UFC on Fuel TV: Sanchez vs. Ellenberger. Miocic won the fight via first-round KO, and in the process won a "Knockout of the Night" award.

Miocic faced promotional newcomer Shane del Rosario on May 26, 2012, at UFC 146. He won via TKO (elbows) in the second round.

Miocic faced Stefan Struve on September 29, 2012, at UFC on Fuel TV 5. He lost the fight via TKO in the second round. The performance earned both participants "Fight of the Night" honors.

Miocic was scheduled to face returning veteran Soa Palelei on June 15, 2013, at UFC 161. After an injury to UFC 161 headliner Renan Barao, the card was slightly reshuffled. Miocic was paired with Roy Nelson. Miocic, as a significant betting underdog, defeated Nelson via unanimous decision (30–27, 30–27, and 30–27).

Miocic faced Gabriel Gonzaga on January 25, 2014, at UFC on Fox 10. He won the fight via unanimous decision (30–27, 30–27, and 29–28).

Miocic was expected to face Junior dos Santos on May 24, 2014, at UFC 173. The bout was then expected to take place a week later on May 31, 2014, at The Ultimate Fighter Brazil 3 Finale. On May 5, 2014, dos Santos pulled out of the fight, citing a hand injury and was replaced by Fábio Maldonado. Miocic won the fight by TKO due to punches early in the first round and received a "Performance of the Night" bonus as well.

A rescheduled bout with dos Santos eventually took place as the main event at UFC on Fox 13 on December 13, 2014. Miocic lost the back-and-forth fight by unanimous decision. The performance earned both participants "Fight of the Night" honors.

Miocic faced Mark Hunt on May 10, 2015, at UFC Fight Night 65. Miocic won the one-sided fight via TKO in the fifth round. At the time of the stoppage, Miocic was ahead on all three scorecards (40–36, 40–35, and 40–34). Miocic set a UFC record for the most strikes landed in a fight and largest strike margin, outlanding Hunt 361–48 over the duration of the bout.

Miocic was expected to face Ben Rothwell on October 24, 2015, at UFC Fight Night 76. Miocic pulled out on October 13 citing injury. Subsequently, Rothwell was removed from the card the following day after the promotion deemed that a suitable opponent could not be arranged on short notice. In turn, Miocic was quickly rebooked and faced Andrei Arlovski in a title eliminator on January 2, 2016, at UFC 195. Miocic defeated Arlovski via TKO at 0:54 in the first round. The win also earned him his second "Performance of the Night" bonus award.

Miocic was briefly scheduled to replace the injured Cain Velasquez and fight Fabrício Werdum for the UFC Heavyweight Championship on February 6, 2016, at UFC Fight Night 82. On January 25, 2016, the day after this announcement, Werdum pulled out of the fight with a back injury.

=== UFC Heavyweight Championship ===
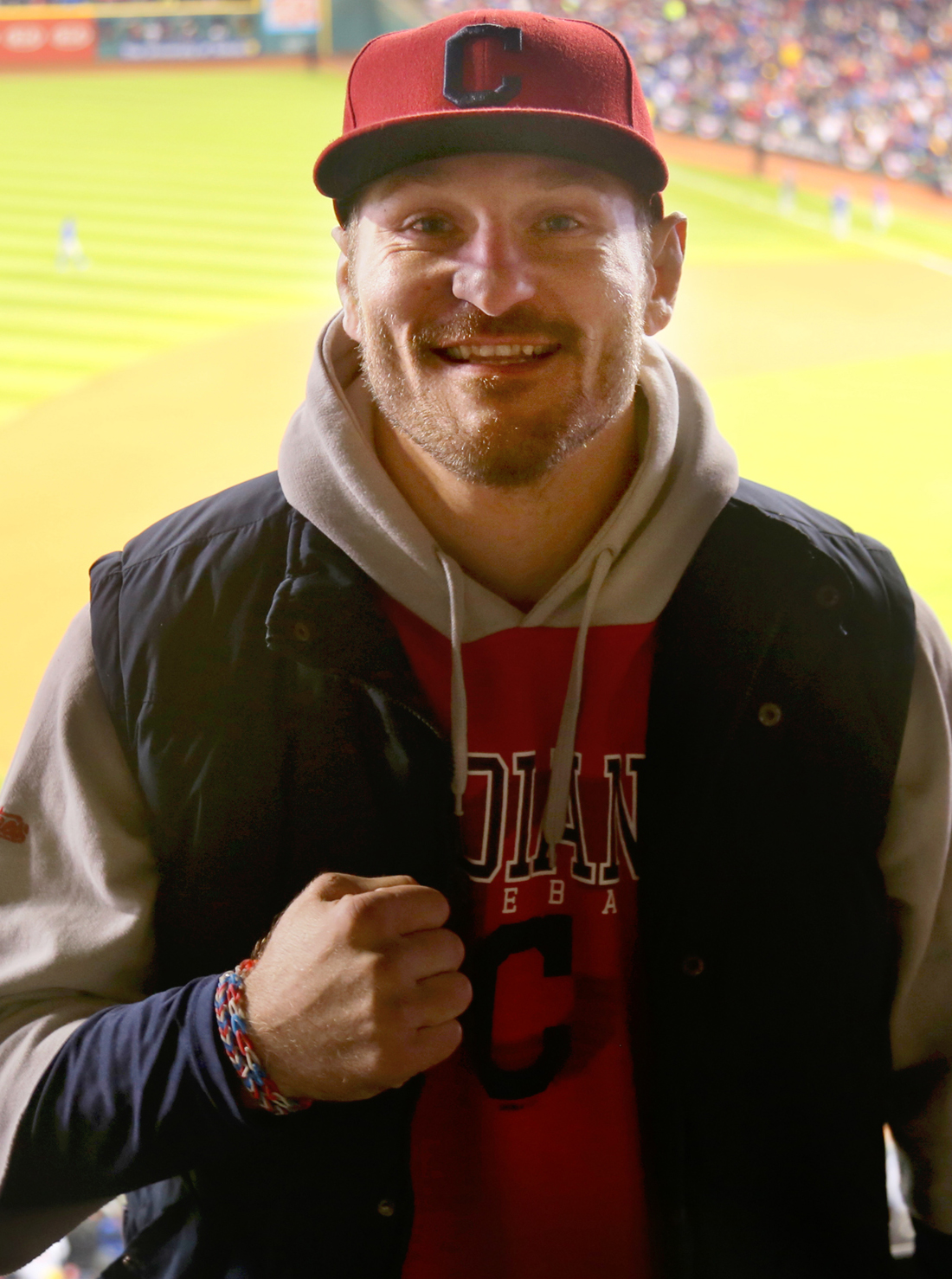
Miocic attending a baseball game in Cleveland in 2016

Miocic eventually faced Werdum at UFC 198 on May 14, 2016. He caught Werdum with a short right hook counter while backpedaling away from a flurry of punches in the first round, earning the championship and giving Werdum his first defeat since June 2011. He was also awarded a Performance of the Night bonus.

On September 10, 2016, Miocic made his first title defense at UFC 203 against Alistair Overeem. Although he got knocked down early in the fight, he came back quickly and won via knockout in the first round. Both participants were awarded Fight of the Night honors.

Miocic made his second title defense against Junior dos Santos on May 13, 2017, at UFC 211 in a rematch. Dos Santos previously beat Miocic by a close unanimous decision at UFC on Fox: dos Santos vs. Miocic in 2014. This time, Miocic started strong and took control of the octagon early. Despite taking hard kicks to the shin, Miocic landed powerful punches with devastating accuracy to drop dos Santos, he then followed up with ground and pound to win the fight via TKO midway through the first round. The win also earned Miocic his fourth Performance of the Night bonus award.

Miocic faced Francis Ngannou on January 20, 2018, at UFC 220. The fight was anticipated as one of the most exciting in UFC history, and Miocic openly felt disrespected because he never received the amount of promotion and support Ngannou did from UFC. Miocic dominated Ngannou for five rounds using strikes with clinch or ground control following takedowns, winning by unanimous decision and breaking the record for most consecutive title defenses for the heavyweight championship with his third successful defense. When he was announced as the winner, instead of the usual practice, he took the belt from Dana White and had his coach Marcus Marinelli put it around him. Miocic received congratulations from both the President Kolinda Grabar-Kitarović and Prime Minister of Croatia Andrej Plenković.

For his fourth title defense, Miocic faced UFC Light Heavyweight Champion Daniel Cormier on July 7, 2018, in the main event at UFC 226. The champion vs. champion matchup was billed as "The Superfight". Miocic was the favorite heading into the bout, mainly due to his natural size and power advantage as well as his dangerous striking on the feet. He lost the fight via knockout in the first round, ending his championship reign. The knockout came in controversial fashion, as Cormier was warned multiple times by referee Marc Goddard for extending his fingers towards Miocic's face and poking him in the eye.

A rematch between Miocic and Daniel Cormier took place on August 17, 2019, at UFC 241 for the UFC Heavyweight Championship. Miocic won the fight by TKO in the fourth round after landing several clean left hooks to the body and following it up with punches to the head, reclaiming the title. This win earned him the Performance of the Night award. He was out until 2020 due to retinal damage from a Cormier eye poke.

On June 9, 2020, it was announced that the trilogy bout between Miocic and Cormier was signed to take place at UFC 252 on August 15, 2020. Miocic won the fight via unanimous decision, this time with both fighters receiving eye pokes during the fight.

Miocic faced Francis Ngannou in a rematch on March 27, 2021, at UFC 260. He lost the title via knockout in the second round.

Following a two-year hiatus, Miocic was scheduled to face Jon Jones for the UFC Heavyweight Championship on November 11, 2023, at UFC 295. However, on October 25, it was announced that the bout was scrapped after Jones sustained a pectoral muscle injury that required surgery which put him out of action for eight months.

After a three-year hiatus since his last bout, Miocic faced current UFC Heavyweight Champion (also former two-time UFC Light Heavyweight Champion) Jon Jones on November 16, 2024, at UFC 309. He lost via technical knockout in the third round. In his post-fight interview, Miocic announced his retirement from mixed martial arts.

== Personal life ==
Miocic works as a full-time firefighter and paramedic, becoming full-time in 2022 after many years of part-time work, in Oakwood and Valley View, Ohio. The reason he stated he switched to full-time was for health care and insurance coverage for his family long-term. When asked by Joe Rogan why he still works as a firefighter despite being a UFC champion, he stated that he needs something to fall back to after his fighting career is over.

He married Ryan Marie Carney on June 18, 2016, at the Divine Word Catholic Church in Kirtland, Ohio. On January 20, 2018, Miocic announced that the couple are expecting their first child. His daughter, Meelah, was born in 2018. They welcomed their second child, a boy named Mateo Cruz, on August 28, 2021, as announced on Miocic's Instagram by Bruce Buffer.

Miocic can understand Croatian, though he is not fluent and has been learning the language.

On November 22, 2022, Miocic announced the death of his father.

== Championships and accomplishments ==
=== Mixed martial arts ===
- Ultimate Fighting Championship
  - UFC Heavyweight Championship (Two times)
    - Four successful title defenses overall
      - Three successful title defenses in his first reign
        - Most consecutive title defenses in UFC Heavyweight division history (3)
      - One successful title defense in his second reign
        - Most combined total defenses in UFC Heavyweight division history (4)
      - Tied (Randy Couture) for most wins in UFC Heavyweight title fights (6)
      - Tied (Randy Couture & Tim Sylvia) for most title bouts in UFC heavyweight history (9)
      - Most finishes in UFC heavyweight title fights (4)
      - Most knockouts in UFC heavyweight title fights (4)
  - Fight of the Night (Three times) vs. Stefan Struve, Junior dos Santos 1 and Alistair Overeem
  - Performance of the Night (Five times) vs. Fábio Maldonado, Andrei Arlovski, Fabrício Werdum, Junior dos Santos 2 and Daniel Cormier 2
  - Knockout of the Night (One time) vs. Philip De Fries
    - Most Post-Fight bonuses in UFC Heavyweight division history (9)
  - Second most head strikes landed in a fight (330) vs. Mark Hunt
  - Fourth most significant strikes landed in UFC Heavyweight division history (1007)
  - Tied (Randy Couture) for fifth most takedowns landed in UFC Heavyweight history (25)
  - Tied (Fabrício Werdum, Derrick Lewis, Francis Ngannou & Sergei Pavlovich) for fifth longest win streak in UFC Heavyweight history (6)
  - Tied (Andrei Arlovski & Alistair Overeem) for fifth most knockouts in UFC Heavyweight history (9)
  - Tied (Alistair Overeem) for ninth most finishes in UFC Heavyweight history (9)
  - Tied for fourth most consecutive knockouts in UFC history (5)
  - Holds wins over five former UFC champions — vs. Andrei Arlovski, Fabricio Werdum, Junior dos Santos, Francis Ngannou and Daniel Cormier (x2)
  - UFC Honors Awards
    - 2019: Fan's Choice Comeback of the Year Winner vs. Daniel Cormier 2
  - UFC.com Awards
    - 2013: Ranked #4 Upset of the Year vs. Roy Nelson
    - 2014: Ranked #3 Fight of the Year vs. Junior dos Santos 1
    - 2016: Ranked #2 Fighter of the Year & Ranked #5 Knockout of the Year vs. Fabricio Werdum
- North American Allied Fight Series
  - NAAFS Heavyweight Champion
- MMA Fighting
  - 2010s #7 Ranked Fighter of the Decade
- The Athletic
  - 2010s Heavyweight Fighter of the Decade
- Bloody Elbow
  - 2010s Heavyweight Fighter of the Decade
- CBS Sports
  - 2016 UFC Fighter of the Year
  - 2019 #4 Ranked UFC Fight of the Year vs. Daniel Cormier
- MMA Junkie
  - 2014 December Fight of the Month vs. Junior dos Santos
  - 2016 #3 Ranked Fighter of the Year
  - 2019 Comeback Fighter of the Year
- Sherdog
  - 2015 Beatdown of the Year vs. Mark Hunt
- Fight Matrix
  - 2016 Male Fighter of the Year
  - 2021 Most Noteworthy Match of the Year vs. Francis Ngannou II at UFC 260
  - Two-time MMA Heavyweight Lineal Champion
- MMADNA.nl
  - 2016 Fighter of the Year.
- MMA Sucka
  - 2019 Comeback of the Year vs. Daniel Cormier II
- World MMA Awards
  - 2019 – July 2020 Comeback of the Year vs. Daniel Cormier at UFC 241
- Sports Illustrated
  - 2016 #4 Ranked Fighter of the Year
- Bleacher Report
  - 2014 #7 Ranked Fight of the Year vs. Junior dos Santos at UFC on Fox: dos Santos vs. Miocic

=== Amateur boxing ===
- 2009 Cleveland Golden Gloves Super Heavyweight Champion (201+ lbs)
- 2009 National Golden Gloves Super Heavyweight Quarterfinalist (201+ lbs)

=== Other ===
- Key to the City of Eastlake: June 7, 2016
- Greater Cleveland Sports Awards Professional Athlete of the Year (2019)
- International Sports Hall of Fame – Class of 2022
- Greater Cleveland Sports Hall of Fame – Class of 2025

== Mixed martial arts record ==
Professional record breakdown
| 25 matches | 20 wins | 5 losses |
| By knockout | 15 | 4 |
| By decision | 5 | 1 |

| Res. | Record | Opponent | Method | Event | Date | Round | Time | Location | Notes |
|---|---|---|---|---|---|---|---|---|---|
| Loss | 20–5 | Jon Jones | TKO (spinning back kick and punches) | UFC 309 | November 16, 2024 | 3 | 4:29 | New York City, New York, United States | For the UFC Heavyweight Championship. |
| Loss | 20–4 | Francis Ngannou | KO (punch) | UFC 260 | March 27, 2021 | 2 | 0:52 | Las Vegas, Nevada, United States | Lost the UFC Heavyweight Championship. |
| Win | 20–3 | Daniel Cormier | Decision (unanimous) | UFC 252 | August 15, 2020 | 5 | 5:00 | Las Vegas, Nevada, United States | Defended the UFC Heavyweight Championship. Broke the record for overall UFC Heavyweight title defenses (4). |
| Win | 19–3 | Daniel Cormier | TKO (punches) | UFC 241 | August 17, 2019 | 4 | 4:09 | Anaheim, California, United States | Won the UFC Heavyweight Championship. Performance of the Night. |
| Loss | 18–3 | Daniel Cormier | KO (punches) | UFC 226 | July 7, 2018 | 1 | 4:33 | Las Vegas, Nevada, United States | Lost the UFC Heavyweight Championship. |
| Win | 18–2 | Francis Ngannou | Decision (unanimous) | UFC 220 | January 20, 2018 | 5 | 5:00 | Boston, Massachusetts, United States | Defended the UFC Heavyweight Championship. Broke the record for the most consecutive UFC Heavyweight title defenses (3). |
| Win | 17–2 | Junior dos Santos | TKO (punches) | UFC 211 | May 13, 2017 | 1 | 2:22 | Dallas, Texas, United States | Defended the UFC Heavyweight Championship. Performance of the Night. |
| Win | 16–2 | Alistair Overeem | KO (punches) | UFC 203 | September 10, 2016 | 1 | 4:27 | Cleveland, Ohio, United States | Defended the UFC Heavyweight Championship. Fight of the Night. |
| Win | 15–2 | Fabrício Werdum | KO (punch) | UFC 198 | May 14, 2016 | 1 | 2:47 | Curitiba, Brazil | Won the UFC Heavyweight Championship. Performance of the Night. |
| Win | 14–2 | Andrei Arlovski | TKO (punches) | UFC 195 | January 2, 2016 | 1 | 0:54 | Las Vegas, Nevada, United States | UFC Heavyweight title eliminator. Performance of the Night. |
| Win | 13–2 | Mark Hunt | TKO (punches) | UFC Fight Night: Miocic vs. Hunt | May 10, 2015 | 5 | 2:47 | Adelaide, Australia | |
| Loss | 12–2 | Junior dos Santos | Decision (unanimous) | UFC on Fox: dos Santos vs. Miocic | December 13, 2014 | 5 | 5:00 | Phoenix, Arizona, United States | Fight of the Night. |
| Win | 12–1 | Fábio Maldonado | TKO (punches) | The Ultimate Fighter Brazil 3 Finale: Miocic vs. Maldonado | May 31, 2014 | 1 | 0:35 | São Paulo, Brazil | Performance of the Night. |
| Win | 11–1 | Gabriel Gonzaga | Decision (unanimous) | UFC on Fox: Henderson vs. Thomson | January 25, 2014 | 3 | 5:00 | Chicago, Illinois, United States | |
| Win | 10–1 | Roy Nelson | Decision (unanimous) | UFC 161 | June 15, 2013 | 3 | 5:00 | Winnipeg, Manitoba, Canada | |
| Loss | 9–1 | Stefan Struve | TKO (punches) | UFC on Fuel TV: Struve vs. Miocic | September 29, 2012 | 2 | 3:50 | Nottingham, England | Fight of the Night. |
| Win | 9–0 | Shane del Rosario | TKO (elbows) | UFC 146 | May 26, 2012 | 2 | 3:14 | Las Vegas, Nevada, United States | |
| Win | 8–0 | Philip De Fries | KO (punches) | UFC on Fuel TV: Sanchez vs. Ellenberger | February 15, 2012 | 1 | 0:43 | Omaha, Nebraska, United States | Knockout of the Night. |
| Win | 7–0 | Joey Beltran | Decision (unanimous) | UFC 136 | October 8, 2011 | 3 | 5:00 | Houston, Texas, United States | |
| Win | 6–0 | Bobby Brents | TKO (submission to leg kicks) | NAAFS: Fight Night in the Flats 7 | June 4, 2011 | 2 | 4:27 | Cleveland, Ohio, United States | Won the NAAFS Heavyweight Championship. |
| Win | 5–0 | William Penn | KO (punch) | NAAFS: Caged Vengeance 9 | April 16, 2011 | 1 | 2:23 | Cleveland, Ohio, United States | NAAFS Heavyweight title eliminator. |
| Win | 4–0 | Gregory Maynard | TKO (punches) | NAAFS: Night of Champions 2010 | December 4, 2010 | 2 | 1:43 | Cleveland, Ohio, United States | |
| Win | 3–0 | Jeremy Holm | KO (punches) | NAAFS: Rock N Rumble 4 | August 28, 2010 | 1 | 1:36 | Cleveland, Ohio, United States | |
| Win | 2–0 | Paul Barry | TKO (punches) | Moosin: God of Martial Arts | May 21, 2010 | 2 | 1:32 | Worcester, Massachusetts, United States | |
| Win | 1–0 | Corey Mullis | TKO (punches) | NAAFS: Caged Fury 9 | February 20, 2010 | 1 | 0:17 | Cleveland, Ohio, United States | Heavyweight debut. |

| Amateur record breakdown | | |
| 5 matches | 5 wins | 0 losses |
| By knockout | 5 | 0 |

| Res. | Record | Opponent | Method | Event | Date | Round | Time | Location | Notes |
|---|---|---|---|---|---|---|---|---|---|
| Win | 5–0 | Nick Turco | TKO (punches) | NAAFS: Fight Night in the Flats 4 | June 7, 2008 | 1 | 0:51 | Cleveland, Ohio, United States | |
| Win | 4–0 | Josh Stansbury | TKO (punches) | NAAFS: Caged Fury 4 | Feb 16, 2008 | 1 | 2:59 | Cleveland, Ohio, United States | |
| Win | 3–0 | Matt Lust | TKO (punches) | NAAFS: Caged Fury 3 | November 3, 2007 | 1 | 1:01 | Cleveland, Ohio, United States | |
| Win | 2–0 | Seth Cole | TKO (punches) | NAAFS: Rock N Rumble 1 | September 8, 2007 | 1 | 0:56 | Cleveland, Ohio, United States | |
| Win | 1–0 | Dave Bush | TKO (punches) | NAAFS: Thursday Night Fights | August 3, 2006 | 1 | 0:45 | Cleveland, Ohio, United States | |

== Pay-per-view bouts ==
| No | Event | Fight | Date | Venue | City | PPV buys |
|---|---|---|---|---|---|---|
| 1. | UFC 198 | Werdum vs. Miocic | May 14, 2016 | Arena da Baixada | Curitiba, Brazil | 217,000 |
| 2. | UFC 203 | Miocic vs. Overeem | September 10, 2016 | Rocket Mortgage FieldHouse | Cleveland, Ohio, U.S. | 475,000 |
| 3. | UFC 211 | Miocic vs. dos Santos 2 | May 13, 2017 | American Airlines Center | Dallas, Texas, U.S. | 300,000 |
| 4. | UFC 220 | Miocic vs. Ngannou | January 20, 2018 | TD Garden | Boston, Massachusetts, U.S. | 380,000 |
| 5. | UFC 226 | Miocic vs. Cormier | July 7, 2018 | T-Mobile Arena | Las Vegas, Nevada, U.S. | 380,000 |
| 6. | UFC 241 | Cormier vs. Miocic 2 | August 17, 2019 | Honda Center | Anaheim, California, U.S. | Not Disclosed |
| 7. | UFC 252 | Miocic vs. Cormier 3 | August 15, 2020 | UFC Apex | Las Vegas, Nevada, U.S. | 500,000 |
| 8. | UFC 260 | Miocic vs. Ngannou 2 | March 27, 2021 | UFC Apex | Las Vegas, Nevada, U.S. | Not Disclosed |
| 9. | UFC 309 | Jones vs. Miocic | November 16, 2024 | Madison Square Garden | New York City, New York, U.S. | Not Disclosed |

== See also ==
- List of male mixed martial artists
- Ultimate Fighting Championship Pound for Pound rankings

Achievements
| Preceded by Fabrício Werdum | 19th UFC Heavyweight Champion; May 14, 2016 – July 7, 2018 | Succeeded by Daniel Cormier |
| Preceded by Daniel Cormier | 21st UFC Heavyweight Champion; August 17, 2019 – March 27, 2021 | Succeeded by Francis Ngannou |
