= UFC 146 =

UFC mixed martial arts event in 2012

UFC 146: dos Santos vs. Mir
- The poster for UFC 146: dos Santos vs. Mir
- Promotion: Ultimate Fighting Championship
- Date: May 26, 2012
- Venue: MGM Grand Garden Arena
- City: Las Vegas, Nevada
- Attendance: 14,674
- Total gate: $3,428,775
- Buyrate: 560,000
- Total purse: $1,513,000

Event chronology
UFC on Fuel TV: The Korean Zombie vs. Poirier	UFC 146: dos Santos vs. Mir	The Ultimate Fighter: Live Finale

UFC 146: dos Santos vs. Mir was a mixed martial arts (MMA) pay-per-view event (PPV) promoted by the Ultimate Fighting Championship (UFC) on May 26, 2012, at the MGM Grand Garden Arena in Las Vegas, Nevada. The main card featured five MMA bouts which were shown on PPV, as well as seven preliminary bouts which were shown on FX, and Facebook. This was the first time in UFC history that the main card featured all heavyweight bouts. It was the twelfth UFC event of 2012.

The main event featured the UFC Heavyweight Champion, Junior dos Santos, defending his title against former two-time UFC Heavyweight Champion Frank Mir. The contest was heavily promoted, featuring the return of UFC Primetime to promote the UFC Heavyweight Championship. The co-main event of the evening was a battle between former heavyweight champion Cain Velasquez, and newly acquired Strikeforce heavyweight, Antônio Silva, who made his UFC debut.

== Background ==
Frank Mir was riding a three fight win streak leading up to this event, including a submission victory over Antônio Rodrigo Nogueira, a friend and mentor of Junior dos Santos, at UFC 140. Nogueira refused to tap to the kimura lock submission attempt, until it broke after his arm snapped under the pressure, then he tapped. Not only was Mir the first fighter to ever submit Nogueira, but he did so in devastating fashion. This was the first title defense for dos Santos since winning the belt by knocking out Cain Velasquez in November 2011 at UFC on Fox: Velasquez vs. Dos Santos.

UFC Primetime returned to promote the UFC Heavyweight Championship between Mir and dos Santos. The heavyweight championship at UFC 146 was the featured fight on the main card, which for the first time in UFC history had all heavyweight bouts.

Evan Dunham was expected to face Edson Barboza at the event. However, Dunham was forced from the event with an injury and replaced by returning veteran Jamie Varner.

Mark Hunt was originally scheduled to face Stefan Struve on the main card. However, on May 17, 2012, Hunt withdrew from the bout due to injury and was replaced by Lavar Johnson.

=== Alistair Overeem removal and card changes ===
Originally scheduled to headline the event was a Heavyweight Championship bout between one of UFC's newest stars, Alistair Overeem (who defeated former champion Brock Lesnar in his UFC debut to earn the title shot), and champion Junior dos Santos. On April 4, 2012, however, the Nevada State Athletic Commission (NSAC) announced Overeem had failed his pre-fight drug test. Overeem's March drug test showed a 14:1 testosterone-epitestosterone ratio, according to the NSAC.

This resulted in a considerable shake up of the matches on the main card. On April 20, 2012, UFC President Dana White announced that Junior dos Santos would now defend his title against Frank Mir instead. Two days later, White announced Cain Velasquez (who was originally slated to fight Mir in the co-main event) would face Antônio Silva. Roy Nelson (who was originally scheduled to fight Silva, and then briefly Gabriel Gonzaga) faced Dave Herman. And Shane del Rosario (who was originally slated to fight Gonzaga) faced Stipe Miocic.

== Results ==
Main Card
Weight class				Method	Round	Time	Notes
Heavyweight	Junior dos Santos (c)	def.	Frank Mir	TKO (punches)	2	3:04	(Note: For the UFC Heavyweight Championship.)
Heavyweight	Cain Velasquez	def.	Antônio Silva	TKO (punches)	1	3:36
Heavyweight	Roy Nelson	def.	Dave Herman	KO (punch)	1	0:51
Heavyweight	Stipe Miocic	def.	Shane del Rosario	TKO (elbows)	2	3:14
Heavyweight	Stefan Struve	def.	Lavar Johnson	Submission (armbar)	1	1:05
Preliminary Card (FX)
Featherweight	Darren Elkins	def.	Diego Brandao	Decision (unanimous) (29–28, 29–28, 29–28)	3	5:00
Lightweight	Jamie Varner	def.	Edson Barboza	TKO (punches)	1	3:23	(Note: This bout aired on the broadcast following the Hardy vs Ludwig bout.)
Middleweight	C. B. Dollaway	def.	Jason Miller	Decision (unanimous) (29–28, 30–26, 29–28)	3	5:00
Welterweight	Dan Hardy	def.	Duane Ludwig	KO (punch and elbows)	1	3:51	(Note: This bout aired on the broadcast following the Nelson vs Herman bout.)
Preliminary Card (Facebook)
Lightweight	Paul Sass	def.	Jacob Volkmann	Submission (triangle armbar)	1	1:54	(Note: This bout aired on the broadcast following the Teixeira vs Kingsbury bout.)
Light Heavyweight	Glover Teixeira	def.	Kyle Kingsbury	Submission (arm-triangle choke)	1	1:53	(Note: This bout aired on the broadcast following the Brown vs Pineda bout.)
Featherweight	Mike Brown	def.	Daniel Pineda	Decision (unanimous) (29–28, 29–28, 29–28)	3	5:00	(Note: This bout aired on the broadcast following the dos Santos vs Mir bout.)

== Bonus awards ==
The following fighters received $70,000 bonuses.

- Fight of the Night: None Awarded
- Knockout of the Night: Roy Nelson and Dan Hardy
- Submission of the Night: Stefan Struve and Paul Sass

== Reported payout ==
The following is the reported payout to the fighters as reported to the Nevada State Athletic Commission. It does not include sponsor money and also does not include the UFC's traditional "fight night" bonuses.

- Junior dos Santos: $200,000 (no win bonus) def. Frank Mir: $200,000
- Cain Velasquez: $200,000 (includes $100,000 win bonus) def. Antonio Silva: $70,000
- Roy Nelson: $40,000 (includes $20,000 win bonus) def. Dave Herman: $21,000
- Stipe Miocic: $20,000 (includes $10,000 win bonus) def. Shane del Rosario: $20,000
- Stefan Struve: $58,000 (includes $29,000 win bonus) def. Lavar Johnson: $26,000
- Darren Elkins: $28,000 (includes $14,000 win bonus) def. Diego Brandao: $15,000
- Jamie Varner: $20,000 (includes $10,000 win bonus) def. Edson Barboza: $18,000
- C. B. Dollaway: $40,000 (includes $20,000 win bonus) def. Jason Miller: $45,000
- Dan Hardy: $50,000 (includes $25,000 win bonus) def. Duane Ludwig: $18,000
- Paul Sass: $20,000 (includes $10,000 win bonus) def. Jacob Volkmann: $20,000
- Glover Teixeira: $30,000 (includes $15,000 win bonus) def. Kyle Kingsbury: $12,000
- Mike Brown: $52,000 (includes $26,000 win bonus) def. Daniel Pineda: $10,000

== See also ==
- List of UFC events
- 2012 in UFC
