= Michael McBride (fighter) =

American mixed martial arts fighter

- Born: March 9, 1986 (age 40); Webster City, Iowa, United States
- Nationality: American
- Height: 6 ft 2 in (1.88 m)
- Weight: 155 lb (70 kg; 11.1 st)
- Division: Lightweight
- Reach: 75 in (190 cm)
- Fighting out of: Webster City, Iowa, United States
- Team: Des Moines Jiu Jitsu Academy
- Years active: 2012–present

Mixed martial arts record
- Total: 11
- Wins: 8
- By submission: 8
- Losses: 3
- By knockout: 1
- By decision: 2

Other information
- Mixed martial arts record from Sherdog

Michael McBride is a lightweight fighter from United States.

== Mixed martial arts career ==
=== Ultimate Fighting Championship ===
McBride made his UFC debut as a replacement for Mairbek Taisumov against Nik Lentz on September 10, 2016, at UFC 203. He lost the fight via TKO in the first round.

McBride next faced Scott Holtzman on April 22, 2017, at UFC Fight Night 108. He lost the fight via unanimous decision.

== Mixed martial arts record ==
Professional record breakdown
11 matches	8 wins	3 losses
By knockout	0	1
By submission	8	0
By decision	0	2

Res.	Record	Opponent	Method	Event	Date	Round	Time	Location	Notes
Loss	8–3	Scott Holtzman	Decision (unanimous)	UFC Fight Night: Swanson vs. Lobov	April 22, 2017	3	5:00	Nashville, Tennessee, United States	
Loss	8–2	Nik Lentz	TKO (punches)	UFC 203	September 10, 2016	2	4:17	Cleveland, Ohio, United States	Catchweight (158 lb) bout; McBride missed weight.
Win	8–1	Derek Loffer	Submission (triangle choke)	MCC 61: Thanksgiving Throwdown	November 25, 2015	2	1:54	Des Moines, Iowa, United States	Won MCC Welterweight Championship.
Win	7–1	Kevin Morris	Submission (rear-naked choke)	Bellator 129	October 17, 2014	1	4:32	Council Bluffs, Iowa, United States	Catchweight (158 lb) bout.
Win	6–1	Paul Hunhoff	Submission (kimura)	Midwest Cage Championship 55	September 19, 2014	1	3:08	Des Moines, Iowa, United States	Won vacant MCC Lightweight Championship.
Win	5-1	Micah Washington	Submission (brabo choke)	Midwest Cage Championship 53	April 11, 2014	1	2:36	Des Moines, Iowa, United States	
Loss	4–1	Emmanuel Sanchez	Decision (unanimous)	RFA 10: Rhodes vs. Jouban	October 25, 2013	3	5:00	Des Moines, Iowa, United States	
Win	4–0	Doug Jenkins	Submission (arm-triangle choke)	Midwest Cage Championship 48	June 14, 2013	2	3:19	Des Moines, Iowa, United States	
Win	3–0	Matt Rider	Submission (rear-naked choke)	Midwest Cage Championship 46	February 22, 2013	1	1:35	Des Moines, Iowa, United States	
Win	2–0	Nick Walker	Submission (rear-naked choke)	MCC 44: Thanksgiving Throwdown	November 21, 2012	1	1:33	Des Moines, Iowa, United States	
Win	1–0	Prentiss Wolf	Submission (triangle choke)	MCC 42: Lund vs. Schmauss	August 3, 2012	1	2:04	Des Moines, Iowa, United States	
