= Junior dos Santos =

Brazilian mixed martial arts fighter (born 1984)

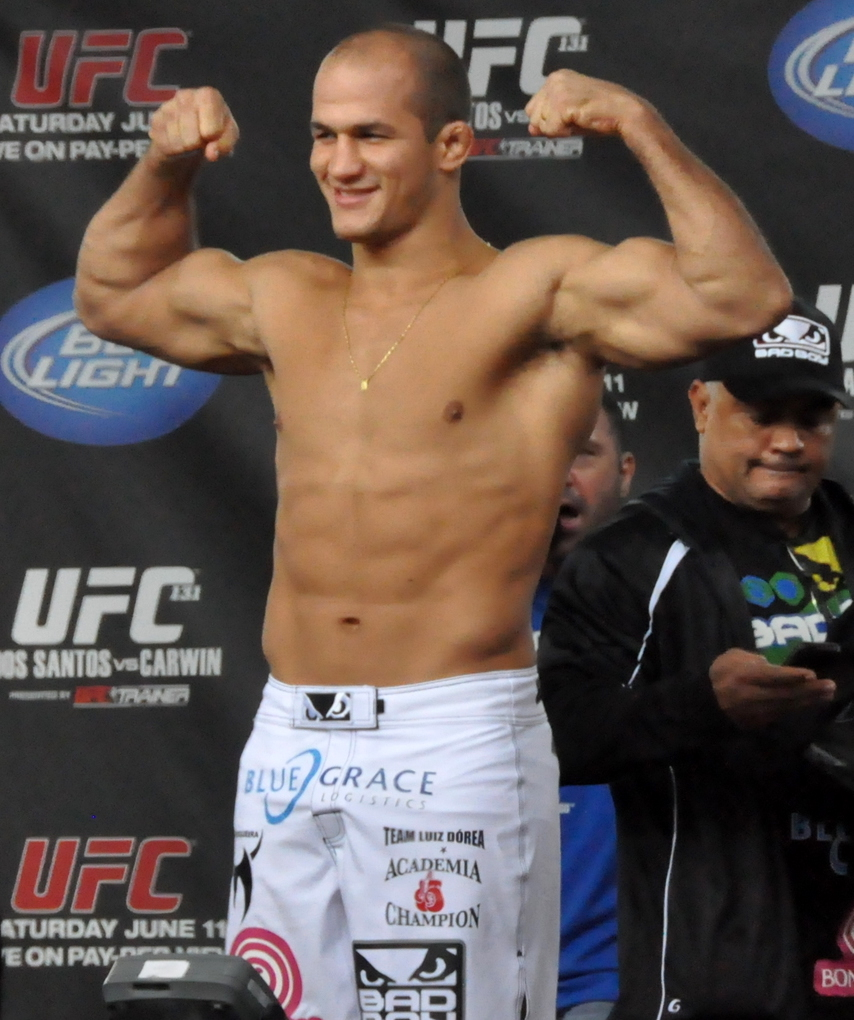
- Dos Santos in June 2011
- Born: Junior dos Santos; 30 January 1984 (age 42); Caçador, Santa Catarina, Brazil
- Other names: Cigano
- Height: 6 ft 4 in (193 cm)
- Weight: 250 lb (113 kg; 17 st 12 lb)
- Division: Heavyweight (2006, 2008−present); Light Heavyweight (2007)
- Reach: 77.0 in (196 cm)
- Fighting out of: Salvador, Bahia, Brazil
- Team: American Top Team
- Trainer: Boxing & MMA: Luiz Dorea; Brazilian Jiu-Jitsu: Yuri Carlton
- Rank: Black belt in Brazilian Jiu-Jitsu under Yuri Carlton
- Years active: 2006–present (MMA); 2021 (professional wrestling)

Mixed martial arts record
- Total: 34
- Wins: 23
- By knockout: 16
- By submission: 1
- By decision: 6
- Losses: 11
- By knockout: 9
- By submission: 1
- By decision: 1

Other information
- Website: juniordossantos.com.br
- Mixed martial arts record from Sherdog

Junior dos Santos (Brazilian Portuguese pronunciation: [ˈʒuni.oʁ dus ˈsɐ̃tus]; born 30 January 1984) is a Brazilian mixed martial artist and former professional wrestler who competes in the Heavyweight division. He is a former UFC Heavyweight Champion and current Gamebred Bareknuckle MMA Heavyweight Champion. As a professional wrestler, dos Santos made appearances for All Elite Wrestling (AEW) as a member of the American Top Team stable.

== Background ==
Dos Santos and his two siblings were raised by a single mother, Maria, after his alcoholic father, Sebastian, left the family in the mid-1990s. He started to work at the age of ten in order to help his family. He trained in capoeira throughout his teenage years before he began taking martial arts seriously at 21, when he began training in Brazilian jiu-jitsu under Yuri Carlton. After six months of training, Dos Santos won a few jiu-jitsu tournaments in Salvador. One year later, Dos Santos was invited to join a boxing practice by a friend, where he met his boxing coach Luiz Carlos Dórea. Dórea also trained mixed martial arts, and roughly a year after he started training in boxing, he had his debut professional fight.

== Mixed martial arts career ==
=== Early career ===
Dos Santos turned professional in 2006, at the age of 22. He fought in small promotions in Brazil, such as Demo Fight, Extreme Fighting Championship, Minotauro Fights and Mo Team League. He won six of his first seven bouts, suffering his only loss to Joaquim Ferreira, a fighter he had previously beaten.

=== Ultimate Fighting Championship (2008–2021) ===
==== Debut (2008–2010) ====
Dos Santos debuted for the UFC on 25 October 2008 at UFC 90. Considered a major underdog, he knocked out top contender Fabricio Werdum at a minute and twenty seconds of the first round, earning himself a "Knockout of the Year" award.

Returning on 21 February 2009 at UFC 95 he fought promotional newcomer Stefan Struve, defeating him at fifty-four seconds of the first round by knockout.

On 19 September 2009, Dos Santos continued his winning streak and defeated Mirko Cro Cop at UFC 103. During the third round Dos Santos dominated Cro Cop in the clinch with knee strikes and punches. A knee from the clinch and a right uppercut apparently caused damage to Mirko's left eye, causing him to submit verbally.

UFC 108 scheduled a fight between Dos Santos and Gabriel Gonzaga. However, Gonzaga pulled out of the bout on 25 November 2009 due to a staph infection. Instead, on 2 January 2010, Dos Santos fought Gilbert Yvel, winning the fight via TKO at two minutes and seven seconds of the first round.

Dos Santos faced Gabriel Gonzaga on 21 March 2010 at UFC Live: Vera vs. Jones. He won the fight via knockout in the first round, earning him his second "Knockout of the Night" award.

==== Heavyweight title contender (2010–2011) ====
Dos Santos faced Roy Nelson on 7 August 2010, at UFC 117. The fight saw Dos Santos use a variety of strikes and, for the first time, a successful takedown. Despite Dos Santos's striking ability, Nelson was able to stay in the fight, resulting in the fight going to decision. Dos Santos won the fight via unanimous decision. Following the win, there was speculation that Dos Santos would challenge Cain Velasquez for the heavyweight title. However, a torn rotator cuff suffered by Velasquez side-lined the champion for nearly a year.

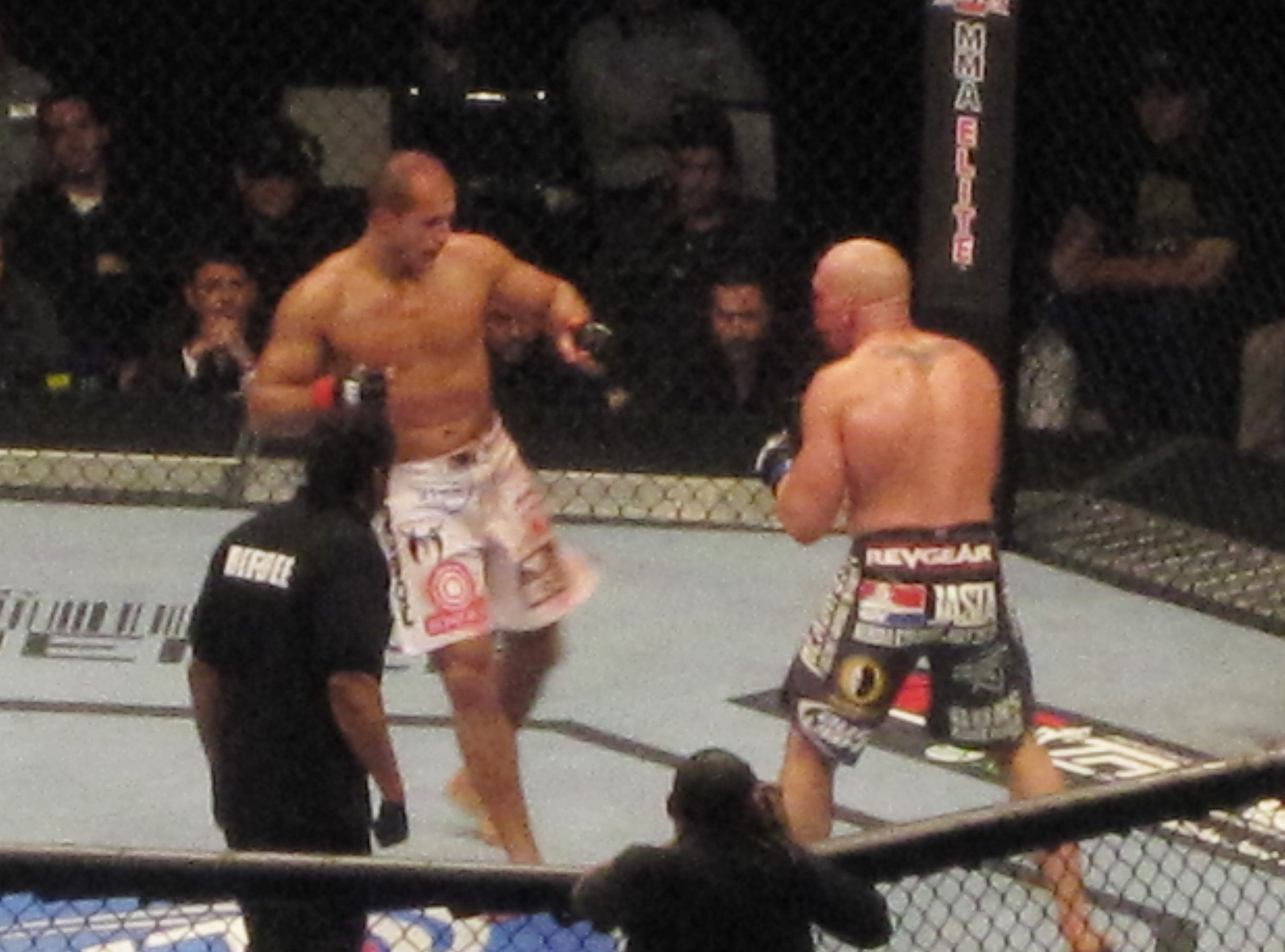
Junior dos Santos in action against Shane Carwin in the main event of UFC 131.

On 11 January 2011, the president of the UFC, Dana White, announced that Dos Santos would be one of the coaches of The Ultimate Fighter Season 13, opposite Brock Lesnar. They were scheduled to face each other on 11 June 2011, at UFC 131, but Lesnar pulled out of the bout due to a recurrence of diverticulitis and was replaced by Shane Carwin. Dos Santos dominated Carwin and won the fight via unanimous decision, relying predominantly on his boxing skills, but showed more variety in his game by landing a couple of kicks and completing two takedowns in the third round.

==== UFC Heavyweight Champion (2011–2012) ====
Dos Santos faced Cain Velasquez at UFC on Fox 1 for the UFC Heavyweight Championship on 12 November 2011. He won the fight via knockout at 64 seconds into the first round. The performance also earned him his third "Knockout of the Night" award. After the fight, it was revealed that he had a torn meniscus in his knee; he subsequently underwent a successful knee surgery.

Dos Santos was scheduled to face Alistair Overeem on 26 May 2012 at the MGM Grand Garden Arena at UFC 146. On 4 April 2012, the Nevada State Athletic Commission announced Overeem had failed a pre-fight drug test. Consequently, Overeem's request for a license was denied. On 20 April 2012, Dana White the UFC president announced Frank Mir would be replacing Overeem. Dos Santos was able to keep the fight standing, showing his superior boxing skills, eventually winning via KO in the second round.

A rematch against Cain Velasquez was expected on 22 September 2012 at UFC 152. However, it was later announced by Dana White that the fight would take place in Las Vegas on 29 December 2012 at UFC 155. Dos Santos lost via unanimous decision. This marked the first time Dos Santos had suffered a loss in the UFC. Dos Santos later claimed that he was training so hard prior to the bout with Velasquez that he developed rhabdomyolysis, a (sometimes fatal) breakdown of muscle fibers that releases their contents into the bloodstream, and that the condition affected his performance during the fight.

==== Back into contention (2013–2021) ====
Dos Santos was expected to face Alistair Overeem on 25 May 2013 at UFC 160. However, in early March, Overeem pulled out of the bout citing an injury. The bout was expected to be rescheduled for a future event, However, on 9 March, UFC President Dana White confirmed that Dos Santos's next opponent would be Mark Hunt at the same event. Dos Santos won the fight via third-round knockout. This fight earned both participants Fight of the Night award.

A third fight with Cain Velasquez took place on 19 October 2013 at UFC 166. Although Dos Santos experienced more moments of success than in their second fight, he was still dominated by Velasquez for most of the fight. He lost via TKO at 3:09 of the fifth round.

Dos Santos was expected to face Stipe Miocic on 24 May 2014 at UFC 173. However, the bout was delayed and was scheduled to take place a week later on 31 May 2014 at The Ultimate Fighter Brazil 3 Finale. However, on 5 May, it was announced that Dos Santos pulled out of the fight citing a hand injury and he was replaced by Fábio Maldonado.

A rescheduled bout with Miocic took place as the main event at UFC on Fox 13 on 13 December 2014. Dos Santos won the back-and-forth fight via unanimous decision. The performance earned both participants Fight of the Night honors.

After a year away from the sport, Dos Santos had the three-years-delayed fight with Alistair Overeem which took place on 19 December 2015 at UFC on Fox 17. He lost the bout by technical knockout in the second round.

Dos Santos faced Ben Rothwell on 10 April 2016 at UFC Fight Night 86. He won the fight via unanimous decision.

Dos Santos was originally expected to face Stefan Struve in a rematch on 19 February 2017 at UFC Fight Night 105. However on 12 January, Struve pulled out due to a shoulder injury. Despite having over six weeks before the event, promotion officials elected to remove Dos Santos from the event instead of having him face a replacement.

Dos Santos faced Stipe Miocic on 13 May 2017 at UFC 211 for the UFC Heavyweight Championship. He had previously beaten Miocic by unanimous decision at UFC on Fox: dos Santos vs. Miocic in 2014. Dos Santos lost the fight via TKO in the first round.

Dos Santos was expected to face Francis Ngannou on 9 September 2017 at UFC 215. However, on 18 August, Dos Santos was pulled from the match after being notified of a potential USADA violation. On 24 April 2018 Dos Santos was cleared of intentionally using of Performance-enhancing drugs (PEDs) by USADA, after it was determined he had taken tainted supplements which contained hydrochlorothiazide from the compounding pharmacies in Brazil. He became eligible to compete on 24 April 2018.

Dos Santos returned from his suspension and faced former WSOF Heavyweight Champion Blagoy Ivanov on 14 July 2018 at UFC Fight Night 133. He won the fight via unanimous decision.

Dos Santos faced Tai Tuivasa on 2 December 2018 at UFC Fight Night 142. He won the fight via technical knockout in round two.

Dos Santos faced Derrick Lewis in the main event of UFC on ESPN+ 4 on 9 March 2019. He won the fight via TKO in the second round. This fight earned him the Fight of the Night award.

Dos Santos faced Francis Ngannou on 29 June 2019 at UFC on ESPN 3. He lost the fight via technical knockout in the first round.

Dos Santos was scheduled to face Alexander Volkov on 9 November 2019 at UFC on ESPN+ 21. However, Dos Santos was forced to pull out from the event due to a bacterial infection in his leg.

As the first bout of his new eight-fight contract, Dos Santos faced Curtis Blaydes on 25 January 2020 at UFC Fight Night 166. He lost the fight via technical knockout in the second round.

Dos Santos faced Jairzinho Rozenstruik on 15 August 2020 at UFC 252. He lost the fight via technical knockout in the second round.

Dos Santos faced Ciryl Gane on 12 December 2020 at UFC 256. He lost the fight via technical knockout in the second round.

On 3 March 2021, it was announced that Dos Santos had been released from the UFC.

=== Eagle Fighting Championship ===
Dos Santos made his Eagle FC debut against Yorgan De Castro on 20 May 2022 at Eagle FC 47. Dos Santos outstruck De Castro for most of the bout, but would go on to lose by technical knockout due to a doctor stoppage after suffering a shoulder injury early in the third round.

=== Gamebred FC ===
Dos Santos fought in a rematch against Fabrício Werdum in a bare knuckle MMA fight on 8 September 2023, at Gamebred Fighting Championship 5. He won the fight by split decision.

Dos Santos faced Alan Belcher for the Gamebred Bareknuckle MMA Heavyweight championship in the main event of Gamebred Bareknuckle MMA 7 on 2 March 2024. Dos Santos won the championship by knockout in the second round.

=== Global Fight League ===
On 11 December 2024, it was announced that Dos Santos was signed by Global Fight League. However, all GFL events were postponed indefinitely.

=== Most Valuable Promotions ===
Dos Santos faced Robelis Despaigne on May 16, 2026 at MVP MMA 1. He lost the fight by knockout in the first round.

== Professional wrestling career ==
=== All Elite Wrestling (2021) ===
In the summer of 2021, dos Santos began making appearances for the professional wrestling promotion All Elite Wrestling, backing American Top Team head Dan Lambert along with ATT affiliated fighters Andrei Arlovski, Paige VanZant, Austin Vanderford, Dalton Rosta, and Jorge Masvidal. They formed an alliance with Ethan Page and Scorpio Sky, otherwise known as the Men of the Year (both of which have legitimate extensive martial arts backgrounds, with Scorpio Sky having fought in MMA competition). On the 6 October edition of AEW Dynamite, it was announced that Dos Santos would be making his professional wrestling debut on the 15 October edition of AEW Rampage, teaming with Sky and Page to take on Jake Hager, Chris Jericho and Sammy Guevara (The Inner Circle) in a trios match.

== Championships and accomplishments ==
=== Mixed Martial Arts ===
- Ultimate Fighting Championship
  - UFC Heavyweight Championship (One time)
  - One successful title defense
  - Knockout of the Night (Three times) vs. Fabrício Werdum, Gabriel Gonzaga and Cain Velasquez
  - Fight of the Night (Three times) vs. Mark Hunt, Stipe Miocic and Derrick Lewis
  - Longest winning streak in UFC Heavyweight division history (9)
  - Most knockdowns landed in UFC Heavyweight division history (14)
    - Tied (Chuck Liddell, Lyoto Machida, Thiago Santos, Maurício Rua & Khalil Rountree Jr.) for sixth most knockdowns landed in UFC history (14)
  - Tied (Cain Velasquez & Francis Ngannou) for second most knockouts in UFC Heavyweight division history (10) (behind Derrick Lewis)
  - Sixth most bouts in UFC Heavyweight division history (23)
  - Tied (Curtis Blaydes & Alexander Volkov) for fourth most wins in UFC Heavyweight division history (15)
  - Fifth most total fight time in UFC Heavyweight division history (4:07:01)
  - Third most significant strikes landed in UFC Heavyweight division history (1109)
  - Highest takedown defense percentage in UFC Heavyweight division history (81.8%)
  - Tied for fourth most consecutive knockouts in UFC history (5)
  - Holds wins over five former UFC champions (4 undisputed) — vs. Fabrício Werdum, Cain Velasquez 1, Frank Mir, Stipe Miocic 1 and Shane Carwin (interim)
  - UFC.com Awards
    - 2008: Ranked #5 Newcomer of the Year Ranked #2 Knockout of the Year vs. Fabricio Werdum & Ranked #2 Upset of the Year vs. Fabricio Werdum
    - 2010: Ranked #6 Fighter of the Year
    - 2011: Ranked #2 Fighter of the Year & Ranked #9 Knockout of the Year vs. Cain Velasquez 1
    - 2013 Half-Year Awards: Best Knockout of the 1HY & Ranked #5 Knockout of the Year vs. Mark Hunt
    - 2014: Ranked #3 Fight of the Year vs. Stipe Miocic 1
- Gamebred Bareknuckle MMA
  - Gamebred Bareknuckle MMA Heavyweight Champion (Inaugural; One time; current)
- FIGHT! Magazine
  - 2008 Upset of the Year vs. Fabrício Werdum at UFC 90
- MMA Junkie
  - 2014 December Fight of the Month vs. Stipe Miocic
- Sherdog
  - 2010 All-Violence Third Team
  - 2011 All-Violence First Team
- MMA Fighting
  - 2008 #8 Ranked UFC Knockout of the Year vs. Fabrício Werdum at UFC 90
- Bleacher Report
  - 2014 #7 Ranked Fight of the Year vs. Stipe Miocic at UFC on Fox: dos Santos vs. Miocic

== Personal life ==
Dos Santos has stated that Antônio Rodrigo "Minotauro" Nogueira is his hero.

He is a Roman Catholic.

In January 2013, he announced that he had divorced his wife of ten years before competing at UFC 155.

On 9 March 2017, Dos Santos's first child, a boy, was born. Dos Santos's second child, a daughter, was named after his mother.

== Filmography ==
Dos Santos featured as one of the contestants for Dança dos Famosos, the Brazilian version of Dancing with the Stars, which started on 25 August 2019 at Globo's "Domingão do Faustão". Dos Santos was eliminated from the competition on 1 December 2019, placing fifth.

== Mixed martial arts record ==
Professional record breakdown
34 matches	23 wins	11 losses
By knockout	16	9
By submission	1	1
By decision	6	1

Res.	Record	Opponent	Method	Event	Date	Round	Time	Location	Notes
Loss	23–11	Robelis Despaigne	KO (punches)	MVP MMA: Rousey vs. Carano	16 May 2026	1	2:59	Inglewood, California, United States	
Win	23–10	Alan Belcher	TKO (punches)	Gamebred Bareknuckle MMA 7	2 March 2024	2	4:39	Orlando, Florida, United States	Won the inaugural Gamebred FC Heavyweight Championship.
Win	22–10	Fabrício Werdum	Decision (split)	Gamebred Bareknuckle MMA 5	8 September 2023	3	5:00	Jacksonville, Florida, United States	Bare Knuckle MMA.
Loss	21–10	Yorgan De Castro	TKO (shoulder injury)	Eagle FC 47	20 May 2022	3	0:35	Miami, Florida, United States	
Loss	21–9	Ciryl Gane	TKO (elbow)	UFC 256	12 December 2020	2	2:34	Las Vegas, Nevada, United States	
Loss	21–8	Jairzinho Rozenstruik	TKO (punches)	UFC 252	15 August 2020	2	3:47	Las Vegas, Nevada, United States	
Loss	21–7	Curtis Blaydes	TKO (punches)	UFC Fight Night: Blaydes vs. dos Santos	25 January 2020	2	1:06	Raleigh, North Carolina, United States	
Loss	21–6	Francis Ngannou	TKO (punches)	UFC on ESPN: Ngannou vs. dos Santos	29 June 2019	1	1:11	Minneapolis, Minnesota, United States	
Win	21–5	Derrick Lewis	TKO (punches)	UFC Fight Night: Lewis vs. dos Santos	9 March 2019	2	1:58	Wichita, Kansas, United States	Fight of the Night.
Win	20–5	Tai Tuivasa	TKO (punches)	UFC Fight Night: dos Santos vs. Tuivasa	2 December 2018	2	2:30	Adelaide, Australia	
Win	19–5	Blagoy Ivanov	Decision (unanimous)	UFC Fight Night: dos Santos vs. Ivanov	14 July 2018	5	5:00	Boise, Idaho, United States	
Loss	18–5	Stipe Miocic	TKO (punches)	UFC 211	13 May 2017	1	2:22	Dallas, Texas, United States	For the UFC Heavyweight Championship.
Win	18–4	Ben Rothwell	Decision (unanimous)	UFC Fight Night: Rothwell vs. dos Santos	10 April 2016	5	5:00	Zagreb, Croatia	
Loss	17–4	Alistair Overeem	TKO (punches)	UFC on Fox: dos Anjos vs. Cowboy 2	19 December 2015	2	4:43	Orlando, Florida, United States	
Win	17–3	Stipe Miocic	Decision (unanimous)	UFC on Fox: dos Santos vs. Miocic	13 December 2014	5	5:00	Phoenix, Arizona, United States	Fight of the Night.
Loss	16–3	Cain Velasquez	TKO (slam and punch)	UFC 166	19 October 2013	5	3:09	Houston, Texas, United States	For the UFC Heavyweight Championship.
Win	16–2	Mark Hunt	KO (spinning hook kick)	UFC 160	25 May 2013	3	4:18	Las Vegas, Nevada, United States	UFC Heavyweight title eliminator. Fight of the Night.
Loss	15–2	Cain Velasquez	Decision (unanimous)	UFC 155	29 December 2012	5	5:00	Las Vegas, Nevada, United States	Lost the UFC Heavyweight Championship.
Win	15–1	Frank Mir	TKO (punches)	UFC 146	26 May 2012	2	3:04	Las Vegas, Nevada, United States	Defended the UFC Heavyweight Championship.
Win	14–1	Cain Velasquez	KO (punches)	UFC on Fox: Velasquez vs. dos Santos	12 November 2011	1	1:04	Anaheim, California, United States	Won the UFC Heavyweight Championship. Knockout of the Night.
Win	13–1	Shane Carwin	Decision (unanimous)	UFC 131	11 June 2011	3	5:00	Vancouver, British Columbia, Canada	UFC Heavyweight title eliminator.
Win	12–1	Roy Nelson	Decision (unanimous)	UFC 117	7 August 2010	3	5:00	Oakland, California, United States	
Win	11–1	Gabriel Gonzaga	TKO (punches)	UFC Live: Vera vs. Jones	21 March 2010	1	3:53	Broomfield, Colorado, United States	Knockout of the Night.
Win	10–1	Gilbert Yvel	TKO (punches)	UFC 108	2 January 2010	1	2:07	Las Vegas, Nevada, United States	
Win	9–1	Mirko Cro Cop	TKO (submission to punch)	UFC 103	19 September 2009	3	2:00	Dallas, Texas, United States	
Win	8–1	Stefan Struve	TKO (punches)	UFC 95	21 February 2009	1	0:54	London, England	
Win	7–1	Fabrício Werdum	TKO (punches)	UFC 90	25 October 2008	1	1:20	Rosemont, Illinois, United States	Knockout of the Night.
Win	6–1	Geronimo dos Santos	TKO (doctor stoppage)	Demo Fight 3	24 May 2008	1	0:44	Salvador, Brazil	Return to Heavyweight.
Loss	5–1	Joaquim Ferreira	Submission (armbar)	Mo Team League: Final	10 November 2007	1	1:13	São Paulo, Brazil	
Win	5–0	Jair Gonçalves	TKO (punches)	Mo Team League 2	29 September 2007	1	2:52	São Paulo, Brazil	
Win	4–0	Joaquim Ferreira	TKO (retirement)	Xtreme FC: Brazil	29 April 2007	1	5:00	Rio de Janeiro, Brazil	Won the XFC Brazil Light Heavyweight (–95kg) Tournament.
Win	3–0	Edson Ramos	TKO (doctor stoppage)	Xtreme FC: Brazil	29 April 2007	1	8:45	Rio de Janeiro, Brazil	Light Heavyweight debut. XFC Brazil Light Heavyweight (–95kg) Tournament Semifinal.
Win	2–0	Eduardo Maiorino	Submission (guillotine choke)	Minotauro Fights 5	9 December 2006	1	0:50	São Bernardo do Campo, Brazil	
Win	1–0	Jailson Silva Santos	KO (soccer kick)	Demo Fight 1	16 July 2006	1	2:58	Salvador, Brazil	Heavyweight debut.

== Pay-per-view bouts ==
No.	Event	Fight	Date	Venue	City	PPV Buys
1.	UFC 103	dos Santos vs. Cro Cop (co)	9 September 2009	American Airlines Center	Dallas, Texas, U.S	375,000
2.	UFC 131	dos Santos vs. Carwin	11 June 2011	Rogers Arena	Vancouver, British Columbia, Canada	325,000
3.	UFC 146	dos Santos vs. Mir	26 May 2012	MGM Grand Garden Arena	Las Vegas, Nevada, U.S	560,000
4.	UFC 155	dos Santos vs. Velasquez 2	29 December 2012	MGM Grand Garden Arena	Las Vegas, Nevada, U.S	590,000
5.	UFC 160	dos Santos vs. Hunt (co)	25 May 2013	MGM Grand Garden Arena	Las Vegas, Nevada, U.S	380,000
6.	UFC 166	Velasquez vs. dos Santos 3	19 October 2013	Toyota Center	Houston, Texas, U.S	330,000
7.	UFC 211	Miocic vs. dos Santos 2	13 May 2017	American Airlines Center	Dallas, Texas, U.S	300,000

== See also ==
- List of male mixed martial artists

Achievements
Preceded by Cain Velasquez	16th UFC Heavyweight Champion; 12 November 2011 – 29 December 2012	Succeeded by Cain Velasquez
