= Drew Dober =

American mixed martial artist (born 1988)

- Born: Andrew Martin Dober; October 19, 1988 (age 38); Omaha, Nebraska, U.S.
- Height: 5 ft 8 in (1.73 m)
- Weight: 155 lb (70 kg; 11.1 st)
- Division: Welterweight (2010, 2013, 2018); Lightweight (2009–present)
- Reach: 70 in (178 cm)
- Fighting out of: Denver, Colorado, U.S.
- Team: Mid-America Martial Arts (formerly); Elevation Fight Team (2014–present)
- Rank: Brown belt in Brazilian Jiu-Jitsu; Black belt in Taekwondo
- Years active: 2009–present

Mixed martial arts record
- Total: 46
- Wins: 29
- By knockout: 16
- By submission: 6
- By decision: 7
- Losses: 16
- By knockout: 4
- By submission: 4
- By decision: 8
- No contests: 1

Other information
- Mixed martial arts record from Sherdog

Andrew Martin Dober (born October 19, 1988) is an American professional mixed martial artist currently competing in the Lightweight division of the Ultimate Fighting Championship (UFC). He holds the record for most knockouts in the lightweight division with eleven. A professional since 2009, he has also formerly competed for Bellator MMA, and Titan Fighting Championship.

== Background ==
Born and raised in Omaha, Nebraska, Dober grew up with a single mother and a half-sibling, and didn't meet his father until he was 18. Dober began training in Muay Thai at the age of 14 and was highly successful, going on to become a two-time Amateur National Champion. He also wrestled his junior and senior years at Millard North High School. Dober is also a brown belt in Brazilian jiu-jitsu, having achieved that rank under Ed Shobe of Mid-America Martial Arts before he moved to train in Colorado.

== Mixed martial arts career ==
=== Early career ===
Dober compiled an amateur record of 9–0 before turning professional in 2009.

=== Bellator ===
Dober faced Nick Nolte at Bellator 16 on April 29, 2010. He won the fight via arm-triangle choke submission in the first round.

=== Independent promotions ===
In the next three years, Dober would compile a 12–2 record in various promotions including Victory Fighting Championship and Titan Fighting Championship. He then appeared on The Ultimate Fighter.

=== The Ultimate Fighter ===
In February 2012, it was revealed that Dober would be a participant on The Ultimate Fighter 15. He was defeated in the entry round by Daron Cruickshank via unanimous decision.

=== Ultimate Fighting Championship ===
Dober stepped in for an injured Sérgio Moraes to face Sean Spencer at The Ultimate Fighter 18 Finale on November 30, 2013. He lost the fight via unanimous decision.

Dober next faced Nick Hein at UFC Fight Night 41 on May 31, 2014. He lost the fight via unanimous decision.

Dober faced former WEC Lightweight Champion Jamie Varner at UFC on Fox 13. He secured his biggest win to date, defeating Varner via rear-naked choke submission in the first round.

Dober faced Leandro Silva on March 21, 2015 at UFC Fight Night 62. Dober lost the fight via technical submission in the second round. Silva was attempting to secure a guillotine choke after dropping to the mat with Dober's neck secured in his arm. Dober defended and moved his body to the side to stave off being caught in the choke. Silva appeared to be losing his grip on the submission as Dober continued to work free. However, the referee stepped in and touched the fighters as if to motion that he was standing them up. In reality, he was stopping the fight due to submission despite the fact that Dober never tapped and was in no significant danger of being choked out from the hold. Despite the loss, UFC awarded Dober his win money with president Dana White stating that he would have liked to see the result overturned and the match declared a no contest. The fight was later overturned to a "No Contest" by the Brazilian MMA Athletic Commission (CABMMA) after the referee Eduardo Herdy admitted his mistake.

Dober then faced Efraín Escudero at UFC 188 on June 13, 2015. He lost the fight by guillotine choke submission in the first round.

Dober was expected to face Erik Koch on January 2, 2016 at UFC 195. However, Koch pulled out of the bout in early December citing injury and was replaced by Scott Holtzman. He won the fight by unanimous decision.

Dober was expected to face Islam Makhachev on April 16, 2016 at UFC on Fox 19. After the weigh ins, the UFC announced that Makhachev had failed an out-of-competition drug screening, testing positive for the banned anti-ischemic meldonium. The match was cancelled.

A rescheduled bout with Erik Koch was expected to take place on September 10, 2016 at UFC 203. However on August 11, Koch pulled out again due to injury and was replaced by promotional newcomer Jason Gonzalez. He won the fight via TKO in the first round.

Dober next faced Olivier Aubin-Mercier on December 10, 2016 at UFC 206. He lost the fight via submission in the second round.

Dober then faced Josh Burkman on July 29, 2017 at UFC 214. He won by first round knockout.

Drew faced Frank Camacho in a welterweight bout on January 27, 2018 at UFC on Fox 27. He won the fight via unanimous decision. This fight earned him the Fight of the Night bonus.

Dober faced Jon Tuck in a lightweight bout on August 25, 2018 at UFC Fight Night 135. He won the fight by unanimous decision.

Dober faced Beneil Dariush on March 9, 2019 at UFC Fight Night 146. He lost the fight via submission in the second round.

Dober faced Polo Reyes on June 29, 2019 at UFC on ESPN 3. He won the fight via knockout in the first round.

Dober faced Nasrat Haqparast on January 18, 2020 at UFC 246. He won the fight via knockout in the first round. This win earned him a Performance of the Night award.

Dober was expected to face Carlos Diego Ferreira on May 2, 2020 at UFC Fight Night: Hermansson vs. Weidman. However, on April 9, Dana White, the president of UFC announced that this event was postponed to a future date. Dober instead faced Alexander Hernandez on May 13, 2020 at UFC Fight Night 171. He won the fight via technical knockout in round two. This fight earned him another Performance of the Night award.

The bout with Ferreira was rescheduled for November 7, 2020 at UFC on ESPN 17. However, Ferreira pulled out on October 22 due to an illness and the bout was scrapped.

Dober faced Islam Makhachev March 6, 2021 at UFC 259. He lost the fight via submission in round three.

Dober faced Brad Riddell on June 12, 2021 at UFC 263. He lost the fight via unanimous decision. This fight earned him the Fight of the Night award.

Dober was next expected to face Ricky Glenn at UFC Fight Night 204 on March 12, 2022. However, a week before the event, Glenn withdrew due to a torn groin and was replaced by Terrance McKinney. After being knocked down twice within the opening minute, Dober rallied and won the fight via technical knockout in round one.

Dober faced Rafael Alves on July 30, 2022, at UFC 277. He won the fight in the third round after knocking out Alves with a punch to the body. The win also earned Dober his third Performance of the Night award.

Dober faced Bobby Green on December 17, 2022, at UFC Fight Night 216. He won the fight via knockout in round two. This fight earned him the Fight of the Night award.

Dober faced Matt Frevola on May 6, 2023, at UFC 288. He lost the fight by TKO at the end of the first round.

Dober faced Ricky Glenn on October 7, 2023, at UFC Fight Night 229. He won the fight via TKO in the first round. With this win, Dober broke the record for most knockouts in UFC Lightweight division history. This win earned him the Performance of the Night award.

Dober faced Renato Moicano on February 3, 2024, at UFC Fight Night 235. Although Dober landed punches that opened Moicano's face, Dober was dominated on the ground for the majority of the fight which led him to lose by unanimous decision.

Dober was scheduled to face Mike Davis on July 13, 2024 at UFC on ESPN 59. However, Davis was forced to withdraw due to a torn bicep and was replaced by Jean Silva, who fought two weeks prior at UFC 303. Dober lost the fight via doctor stoppage in the third round after being rendered unable to continue due to a cut above the left eye. This fight earned him another Fight of the Night award.

Dober faced Manuel Torres on March 29, 2025 at UFC on ESPN 64. He lost the fight by technical knockout in the first round.

Dober faced Kyle Prepolec on October 18, 2025, at UFC Fight Night 262. Despite receiving a one-point deduction for an illegal groin strike in the third round, Dober secured victory via technical knockout. The victory marked Dober’s tenth knockout in the UFC lightweight division, setting a new divisional record. This fight earned him another Fight of the Night award.

Dober faced Michael Johnson on March 7, 2026 at UFC 326. He won the fight by knockout in the second round. This fight earned him a $100,000 Performance of the Night award.

Dober faced Chris Duncan on November 14, 2026 at UFC 334. He lost the fight by unanimous decision.

== Personal life ==
Dober met his first wife Gloria Hein, the sister of his UFC opponent Nick Hein, following their bout at UFC Fight Night 41 in Berlin, Germany. The two met at the post-fight after-party, and were married for two years before divorcing.

Dober married his second wife Hollis Casey in August 2021. They have one daughter together that was born in 2023. In October 2025, Dober revealed that he and his wife lost an unborn child through miscarriage during his training camp for his fight vs. Kyle Prepolec.

Outside of fighting, Dober enjoys playing video games. He has a YouTube channel.

== Championships and accomplishments ==
=== Mixed martial arts ===
- Ultimate Fighting Championship
  - Fight of the Night (Five times) vs. Frank Camacho, Brad Riddell, Bobby Green, Jean Silva and Kyle Prepolec
  - Performance of the Night (Five times) vs. Nasrat Haqparast, Alexander Hernandez, Rafael Alves, Ricky Glenn and Michael Johnson
  - Most knockouts in UFC Lightweight division history (11)
    - Tied (Anderson Silva, Thiago Santos, Dustin Poirier & Anthony Johnson) for fifth most knockouts in UFC history (11)
  - Fourth most finishes in UFC Lightweight division history (12)
  - Tied (Edson Barboza & Justin Gaethje) for fifth most knockdowns landed in UFC Lightweight division history (10)
  - UFC.com Awards
    - 2018: Ranked #9 Fight of the Year vs. Frank Camacho
- Sherdog
  - 2022 Round of the Year vs. Terrance McKinney
- MMA Fighting
  - 2022 First Team MMA All-Star

== Mixed martial arts record ==
Professional record breakdown
46 matches	29 wins	16 losses
By knockout	16	4
By submission	6	4
By decision	7	8
No contests	1	

Res.	Record	Opponent	Method	Event	Date	Round	Time	Location	Notes
Loss	29–16 (1)	Chris Duncan	Decision (unanimous)	UFC 334	November 14, 2026	3	5:00	New York City, New York, United States	
Win	29–15 (1)	Michael Johnson	KO (punch)	UFC 326	March 7, 2026	2	1:53	Las Vegas, Nevada, United States	Performance of the Night.
Win	28–15 (1)	Kyle Prepolec	TKO (knees and punches)	UFC Fight Night: de Ridder vs. Allen	October 18, 2025	3	1:16	Vancouver, British Columbia, Canada	Dober was deducted one point in round 3 due to an illegal groin strike. Fight of the Night.
Loss	27–15 (1)	Manuel Torres	TKO (punches)	UFC on ESPN: Moreno vs. Erceg	March 29, 2025	1	1:45	Mexico City, Mexico	
Loss	27–14 (1)	Jean Silva	TKO (doctor stoppage)	UFC on ESPN: Namajunas vs. Cortez	July 13, 2024	3	1:28	Denver, Colorado, United States	Fight of the Night.
Loss	27–13 (1)	Renato Moicano	Decision (unanimous)	UFC Fight Night: Dolidze vs. Imavov	February 3, 2024	3	5:00	Las Vegas, Nevada, United States	
Win	27–12 (1)	Ricky Glenn	TKO (punches)	UFC Fight Night: Dawson vs. Green	October 7, 2023	1	2:36	Las Vegas, Nevada, United States	Performance of the Night.
Loss	26–12 (1)	Matt Frevola	TKO (punches)	UFC 288	May 6, 2023	1	4:08	Newark, New Jersey, United States	
Win	26–11 (1)	Bobby Green	KO (punch)	UFC Fight Night: Cannonier vs. Strickland	December 17, 2022	2	2:45	Las Vegas, Nevada, United States	Fight of the Night.
Win	25–11 (1)	Rafael Alves	KO (punch to the body)	UFC 277	July 30, 2022	3	1:30	Dallas, Texas, United States	Performance of the Night.
Win	24–11 (1)	Terrance McKinney	TKO (knee and punches)	UFC Fight Night: Santos vs. Ankalaev	March 12, 2022	1	3:17	Las Vegas, Nevada, United States	
Loss	23–11 (1)	Brad Riddell	Decision (unanimous)	UFC 263	June 12, 2021	3	5:00	Glendale, Arizona, United States	Fight of the Night.
Loss	23–10 (1)	Islam Makhachev	Submission (arm-triangle choke)	UFC 259	March 6, 2021	3	1:37	Las Vegas, Nevada, United States	
Win	23–9 (1)	Alexander Hernandez	TKO (punches)	UFC Fight Night: Smith vs. Teixeira	May 13, 2020	2	4:25	Jacksonville, Florida, United States	Performance of the Night.
Win	22–9 (1)	Nasrat Haqparast	KO (punches)	UFC 246	January 18, 2020	1	1:10	Las Vegas, Nevada, United States	Performance of the Night.
Win	21–9 (1)	Polo Reyes	TKO (punches)	UFC on ESPN: Ngannou vs. dos Santos	June 29, 2019	1	1:07	Minneapolis, Minnesota, United States	
Loss	20–9 (1)	Beneil Dariush	Submission (triangle armbar)	UFC Fight Night: Lewis vs. dos Santos	March 9, 2019	2	4:41	Wichita, Kansas, United States	
Win	20–8 (1)	Jon Tuck	Decision (unanimous)	UFC Fight Night: Gaethje vs. Vick	August 25, 2018	3	5:00	Lincoln, Nebraska, United States	
Win	19–8 (1)	Frank Camacho	Decision (unanimous)	UFC on Fox: Jacaré vs. Brunson 2	January 27, 2018	3	5:00	Charlotte, North Carolina, United States	Welterweight bout. Fight of the Night.
Win	18–8 (1)	Josh Burkman	KO (punch)	UFC 214	July 29, 2017	1	3:04	Anaheim, California, United States	
Loss	17–8 (1)	Olivier Aubin-Mercier	Submission (rear-naked choke)	UFC 206	December 10, 2016	2	2:57	Toronto, Ontario, Canada	
Win	17–7 (1)	Jason Gonzalez	KO (punches)	UFC 203	September 10, 2016	1	1:45	Cleveland, Ohio, United States	
Win	16–7 (1)	Scott Holtzman	Decision (unanimous)	UFC 195	January 2, 2016	3	5:00	Las Vegas, Nevada, United States	
Loss	15–7 (1)	Efraín Escudero	Submission (standing guillotine choke)	UFC 188	June 13, 2015	1	0:54	Mexico City, Mexico	
NC	15–6 (1)	Leandro Silva	NC (overturned)	UFC Fight Night: Maia vs. LaFlare	March 21, 2015	2	2:45	Rio de Janeiro, Brazil	Originally a submission (guillotine choke) win for Silva; overturned by CABMMA as the referee errantly stopped the fight.
Win	15–6	Jamie Varner	Submission (rear-naked choke)	UFC on Fox: dos Santos vs. Miocic	December 13, 2014	1	1:52	Phoenix, Arizona, United States	
Loss	14–6	Nick Hein	Decision (unanimous)	UFC Fight Night: Muñoz vs. Mousasi	May 31, 2014	3	5:00	Berlin, Germany	
Loss	14–5	Sean Spencer	Decision (unanimous)	The Ultimate Fighter: Team Rousey vs. Team Tate Finale	November 30, 2013	3	5:00	Las Vegas, Nevada, United States	Welterweight bout.
Win	14–4	Tony Sims	Decision (split)	Fight to Win: Prize FC 4	October 18, 2013	3	5:00	Denver, Colorado, United States	
Win	13–4	T.J. O'Brien	Submission (rear-naked choke)	Victory FC 40	July 27, 2013	2	3:57	Ralston, Nebraska, United States	
Win	12–4	Aaron Derrow	Decision (unanimous)	Centurion Fights 1	March 1, 2013	3	5:00	St. Joseph, Missouri, United States	Welterweight bout.
Win	11–4	Sean Wilson	Submission (rear-naked choke)	Disorderly Conduct 15	January 26, 2013	1	4:58	Omaha, Nebraska, United States	
Win	10–4	Roberto Rojas Jr.	Submission (rear-naked choke)	Victory FC 38	December 15, 2012	1	3:29	Ralston, Nebraska, United States	
Loss	9–4	Will Brooks	Decision (unanimous)	Disorderly Conduct 10	August 10, 2012	3	5:00	Omaha, Nebraska, United States	Catchweight (162 lb) bout.
Win	9–3	Ted Worthington	Submission (verbal)	Victory FC 37	April 13, 2012	3	1:36	Council Bluffs, Iowa, United States	
Win	8–3	Jordan Johnson	TKO (submission to punches)	Disorderly Conduct 4	November 4, 2011	2	0:30	Omaha, Nebraska, United States	
Win	7–3	Sam Jackson	Decision (unanimous)	Victory FC 35	July 30, 2011	3	5:00	Council Bluffs, Iowa, United States	
Loss	6–3	Ramiro Hernandez	KO (punches)	Victory FC 34	April 1, 2011	1	2:29	Council Bluffs, Iowa, United States	
Win	6–2	Bobby Cooper	Decision (unanimous)	Titan FC 16	January 28, 2011	3	5:00	Kansas City, Kansas, United States	Catchweight (165 lb) bout.
Win	5–2	Kody Frank	TKO (punches)	Victory FC 33	December 11, 2010	2	3:44	Council Bluffs, Iowa, United States	
Win	4–2	Steve Simmons	TKO (submission to punches)	Fight to Win: The Professionals	November 12, 2010	3	1:37	Denver, Colorado, United States	
Win	3–2	Jimmy Seipel	TKO (submission to punches and elbows)	Victory FC 32	July 30, 2010	2	3:16	Council Bluffs, Iowa, United States	Return to Lightweight.
Win	2–2	Nick Nolte	Submission (arm-triangle choke)	Bellator 16	April 29, 2010	1	4:45	Kansas City, Missouri, United States	Welterweight debut.
Loss	1–2	Brandon Girtz	Decision (unanimous)	Victory FC 29	November 13, 2009	3	5:00	Council Bluffs, Iowa, United States	
Loss	1–1	Chase Hackett	Decision (unanimous)	Fight to Win: Featherweight Grand Prix Final Round	September 12, 2009	3	5:00	Denver, Colorado, United States	
Win	1–0	Frank Caraballo	TKO (punches)	Victory FC 28	July 24, 2009	2	3:58	Council Bluffs, Iowa, United States	Lightweight debut.

== See also ==
- List of current UFC fighters
- List of Bellator MMA alumni
- List of male mixed martial artists
