= UFC 203 =

UFC mixed martial arts event in 2016

UFC 203: Miocic vs. Overeem
- The poster for UFC 203: Miocic vs. Overeem
- Promotion: Ultimate Fighting Championship
- Date: September 10, 2016
- Venue: Quicken Loans Arena
- City: Cleveland, Ohio
- Attendance: 18,875
- Total gate: $2,600,000
- Buyrate: 450,000

Event chronology
| UFC Fight Night: Arlovski vs. Barnett | UFC 203: Miocic vs. Overeem | UFC Fight Night: Poirier vs. Johnson |

UFC 203: Miocic vs. Overeem was a mixed martial arts event produced by the Ultimate Fighting Championship held on September 10, 2016, at the Quicken Loans Arena in Cleveland, Ohio.

== Background ==
This was the first UFC event in Cleveland.

The event was headlined by a UFC Heavyweight Championship bout between current champion (and Cleveland area native) Stipe Miocic against 2010 K-1 World Grand Prix winner and former Strikeforce Heavyweight Champion Alistair Overeem.

The professional debut of former professional wrestler CM Punk took place at this event. Punk, who signed with the UFC in December 2014, had a delayed debut due to past injuries from professional wrestling that needed treatment and also due to his need for training time. He made his debut against Mickey Gall in a welterweight bout.

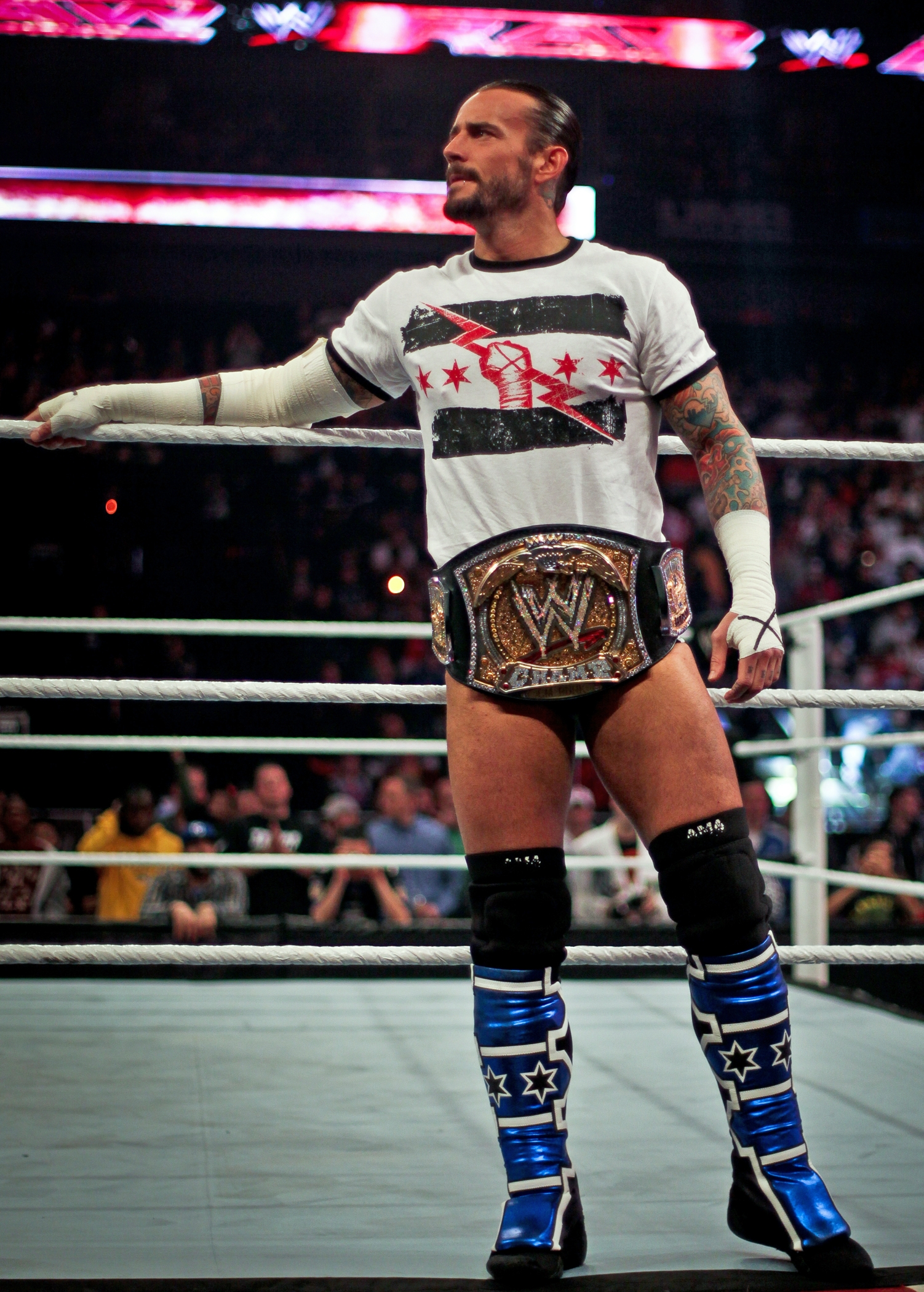
The signing of CM Punk was originally announced during the UFC 181 broadcast on December 6, 2014.

Ben Rothwell was expected to face former heavyweight champion Fabrício Werdum at this event. However, on August 11, Rothwell pulled out due to injury. A team representative said he may have suffered a torn meniscus and could have an ACL injury. He was replaced by Travis Browne. This was a rematch as Werdum defeated Browne via unanimous decision at UFC on Fox: Werdum vs. Browne in 2014.

A lightweight bout between Erik Koch and Drew Dober was originally booked for UFC 195, but Koch pulled out due to an injury and the bout was scrapped. The fight was later rescheduled for this event, until Koch pulled out again due to injury and was replaced by promotional newcomer Jason Gonzalez.

Mairbek Taisumov was expected to face Nik Lentz at the event. However, Taisumov was removed from the fight on September 1 for alleged visa issues and replaced by promotional newcomer Michael McBride.

On September 5, it was announced that the lightweight bout between Damir Hadžović and Yusuke Kasuya, slated to open the preliminary portion of the card, was postponed and will now take place at October's UFC Fight Night: Lamas vs. Penn after Hadžović experienced issues with his travel visa.

Ray Borg was scheduled to face Ian McCall at the event. However, Borg pulled out of the fight on September 7 citing an illness. With no time to find a suitable replacement, McCall was removed from the card.

Michael McBride missed weight, coming in at 158 lb. As a result, he was fined 20% of his fight purse, which went to his opponent Nik Lentz.

On the day of the event, C.B. Dollaway was forced out of his bout against Francimar Barroso due to a back injury he sustained in a malfunctioning elevator at his hotel. As a result, Barroso was also removed from the event.

== Results ==
Main Card
| Weight class | | | | Method | Round | Time | Notes |
|---|---|---|---|---|---|---|---|
| Heavyweight | Stipe Miocic (c) | def. | Alistair Overeem | KO (punches) | 1 | 4:27 | (Note: For the UFC Heavyweight Championship.) |
| Heavyweight | Fabrício Werdum | def. | Travis Browne | Decision (unanimous) (29–28, 29–27, 30–27) | 3 | 5:00 |
| Welterweight | Mickey Gall | def. | CM Punk | Submission (rear-naked choke) | 1 | 2:14 |
| Bantamweight | Jimmie Rivera | def. | Urijah Faber | Decision (unanimous) (30–27, 30–27, 30–27) | 3 | 5:00 |
| Women's Strawweight | Jéssica Andrade | def. | Joanne Calderwood | Submission (guillotine choke) | 1 | 4:38 |
Preliminary Card (Fox Sports 1)
| Women's Bantamweight | Bethe Correia | def. | Jessica Eye | Decision (split) (29–28, 28–29, 29–28) | 3 | 5:00 |
| Middleweight | Brad Tavares | def. | Caio Magalhães | Decision (split) (28–29, 30–27, 29–28) | 3 | 5:00 |
| Catchweight (158 lb) | Nik Lentz | def. | Michael McBride | TKO (punches) | 2 | 4:17 |
| Lightweight | Drew Dober | def. | Jason Gonzalez | TKO (punches) | 1 | 1:45 |
Preliminary Card (UFC Fight Pass)
| Welterweight | Yancy Medeiros | def. | Sean Spencer | Submission (rear-naked choke) | 2 | 0:49 |

== Bonus awards ==
The following fighters were awarded $50,000 bonuses:

- Fight of the Night: Stipe Miocic vs. Alistair Overeem
- Performance of the Night: Jéssica Andrade and Yancy Medeiros

== Reported payout ==
The following is the reported payout to the fighters as reported to the Ohio Athletic Commission. It does not include sponsor money or "locker room" bonuses often given by the UFC and also do not include the UFC's traditional "fight night" bonuses. The total disclosed payout for the event was $3,056,000.

- Stipe Miocic: $600,000 (no win bonus) def. Alistair Overeem: $800,000
- Fabrício Werdum: $375,000 (includes $125,000 win bonus) def. Travis Browne: $120,000
- Mickey Gall: $30,000 (includes $15,000 win bonus) def. CM Punk: $500,000
- Jimmie Rivera: $48,000 (includes $24,000 win bonus) def. Urijah Faber: $160,000
- Jéssica Andrade: $46,000 (includes $23,000 win bonus) def. Joanne Calderwood: $25,000
- Bethe Correia: $50,000 (includes $25,000 win bonus) def. Jessica Eye: $25,000
- Brad Tavares: $56,000 (includes $28,000 win bonus) def. Caio Magalhães: $20,000
- Nik Lentz: $76,000 (includes $38,000 win bonus) def. Michael McBride: $12,000 ^
- Drew Dober: $38,000 (includes $19,000 win bonus) def. Jason Gonzalez: $10,000
- Yancy Medeiros: $48,000 (includes $24,000 win bonus) def. Sean Spencer: $17,000

^ Michael McBride was fined 20 percent of his purse for failing to make the required weight for his fight with Nik Lentz. That money was issued to Lentz, an OAC official confirmed.

== See also ==
- List of UFC events
- 2016 in UFC
