= UFC 195 =

UFC mixed martial arts event in 2016

UFC 195: Lawler vs. Condit
- The poster for UFC 195: Lawler vs. Condit
- Promotion: Ultimate Fighting Championship
- Date: January 2, 2016
- Venue: MGM Grand Garden Arena
- City: Las Vegas, Nevada, U.S.
- Attendance: 10,300
- Total gate: $2,003,986
- Buyrate: 300,000

Event chronology
UFC on Fox: dos Anjos vs. Cowboy 2	UFC 195: Lawler vs. Condit	UFC Fight Night: Dillashaw vs. Cruz

UFC 195: Lawler vs. Condit was a mixed martial arts event held on January 2, 2016, at the MGM Grand Garden Arena in Las Vegas, Nevada.

== Background ==
The event was expected to feature a UFC Women's Bantamweight Championship bout between then-undefeated champion Ronda Rousey and Holly Holm, a former 18-time boxing world champion in three weight classes. However, the bout was moved to UFC 193 after a thumb injury to UFC Welterweight Champion Robbie Lawler forced him out of his title bout against Carlos Condit, a former WEC Welterweight Champion and former interim UFC Welterweight Champion on UFC 193. The Lawler/Condit pairing remained intact and headlined this event.

A welterweight bout between Sheldon Westcott and Edgar García, originally scheduled for UFC Fight Night: Namajunas vs. VanZant was moved to this event.

A lightweight bout between Dustin Poirier and Joseph Duffy was originally booked as main event for UFC Fight Night: Holohan vs. Smolka. However, the bout was canceled on fight week due to Duffy sustaining a concussion during a sparring session. The fight was later rescheduled for this event.

Neil Magny was briefly scheduled to face Stephen Thompson at the event. However, on November 3, Magny was pulled from the pairing in favor of a matchup with Kelvin Gastelum at The Ultimate Fighter Latin America 2 Finale. Thompson was expected to remain on the card, but on December 13 it was announced that he was going to face former UFC Welterweight champion Johny Hendricks at UFC 196.

Russell Doane was briefly scheduled to face Michinori Tanaka at the event. However, Doane was pulled from the pairing for undisclosed reasons and was replaced by former Bellator Featherweight champion and one time UFC Bantamweight Championship challenger Joe Soto.

Erik Koch was expected to face Drew Dober at this event. However, on December 4, Koch was forced to pull out of the event due to injury and was replaced by Scott Holtzman.

Kelvin Gastelum was expected to face Kyle Noke at this event. However, on December 22, Gastelum was forced to pull out due to a wrist injury and was replaced by promotional newcomer Alex Morono.

On March 23, it was announced that Diego Brandão tested positive for marijuana metabolites and was issued a temporary suspension by the Nevada State Athletic Commission (NSAC). He was eventually suspended on May 19 for a period of nine months by USADA, retroactive to the date of the fight.

== Results ==
Main Card
Weight class				Method	Round	Time	Notes
Welterweight	Robbie Lawler (c)	def.	Carlos Condit	Decision (split) (47–48, 48–47, 48–47)	5	5:00	(Note: For the UFC Welterweight Championship.)
Heavyweight	Stipe Miocic	def.	Andrei Arlovski	TKO (punches)	1	0:54	(Note: UFC heavyweight title eliminator)
Welterweight	Albert Tumenov	def.	Lorenz Larkin	Decision (split) (29–28, 28–29, 29–28)	3	5:00
Featherweight	Brian Ortega	def.	Diego Brandão	Submission (triangle choke)	3	1:37
Lightweight	Abel Trujillo	def.	Tony Sims	Submission (guillotine choke)	1	3:18
Preliminary Card (Fox Sports 1)
Bantamweight	Michael McDonald	def.	Masanori Kanehara	Submission (rear-naked choke)	2	2:09
Welterweight	Alex Morono	def.	Kyle Noke	Decision (split) (29–28, 27–30, 29–28)	3	5:00
Women's Strawweight	Justine Kish	def.	Nina Ansaroff	Decision (unanimous) (29–28, 30–27, 30–27)	3	5:00
Lightweight	Drew Dober	def.	Scott Holtzman	Decision (unanimous) (29–28, 29–28, 29–28)	3	5:00
Preliminary Card (UFC Fight Pass)
Lightweight	Dustin Poirier	def.	Joseph Duffy	Decision (unanimous) (30–26, 30–27, 30–27)	3	5:00
Bantamweight	Michinori Tanaka	def.	Joe Soto	Decision (split) (29–28, 28–29, 29–28)	3	5:00
Welterweight	Sheldon Westcott	def.	Edgar García	TKO (punches)	1	3:12

== Bonus awards ==
The following fighters were awarded $50,000 bonuses:

- Fight of the Night: Robbie Lawler vs. Carlos Condit
- Performance of the Night: Stipe Miocic and Michael McDonald

== Reported payout ==
The following is the reported payout to the fighters as reported to the Nevada State Athletic Commission. It does not include sponsor money and also does not include the UFC's traditional "fight night" bonuses.

- Robbie Lawler: $500,000 (no win bonus) def. Carlos Condit: $350,000
- Stipe Miocic: $120,000 (includes $60,000 win bonus) def. Andrei Arlovski: $250,000
- Albert Tumenov: $40,000 (includes $20,000 win bonus) def. Lorenz Larkin: $36,000
- Brian Ortega: $24,000 (includes $12,000 win bonus) def. Diego Brandão: $36,000
- Abel Trujillo: $40,000 (includes $20,000 win bonus) def. Tony Sims: $12,000
- Michael McDonald: $40,000 (includes $20,000 win bonus) def. Masanori Kanehara: $14,000
- Alex Morono: $24,000 (includes $12,000 win bonus) def. Kyle Noke: $26,000
- Justine Kish: $20,000 (includes $10,000 win bonus) def. Nina Ansaroff: $10,000
- Drew Dober: $26,000 (includes $13,000 win bonus) def. Scott Holtzman: $12,000
- Dustin Poirier: $84,000 (includes $42,000 win bonus) def. Joseph Duffy: $20,000
- Michinori Tanaka: $24,000 (includes $12,000 win bonus) def. Joe Soto: $20,000
- Shelden Westcott: $20,000 (includes $10,000 win bonus) def. Edgar Garcia: $10,000

== See also ==
- List of UFC events
- 2016 in UFC
