= UFC on Fox: dos Santos vs. Miocic =

Ultimate Fighting Championship mixed martial arts event in 2014

- The poster for UFC on Fox: dos Santos vs. Miocic
- Promotion: Ultimate Fighting Championship
- Date: December 13, 2014
- Venue: U.S. Airways Center
- City: Phoenix, Arizona
- Attendance: 15,350
- Total gate: $1.5 million

Event chronology
The Ultimate Fighter: A Champion Will Be Crowned Finale	UFC on Fox: dos Santos vs. Miocic	UFC Fight Night: Machida vs. Dollaway

UFC on Fox: dos Santos vs. Miocic (also known as UFC on Fox 13) was a mixed martial arts event held at U.S. Airways Center in Phoenix, Arizona, on December 13, 2014.

== Background ==
The event was the first that UFC hosted in Arizona. Zuffa previously hosted the final World Extreme Cagefighting event, WEC 53, in nearby Glendale in 2010.

The fight card was headlined by a heavyweight bout between former UFC Heavyweight Champion Junior dos Santos and Stipe Miocic.

Jussier Formiga was expected to face John Moraga at the event. However, Formiga was forced to pull out of the fight due to injury and was replaced by UFC newcomer Willie Gates.

Nate Diaz missed weight on his first attempt at the weigh-ins, weighing in at 160.6 pounds. He was given additional time to make the lightweight limit, but made no attempt to cut further. Instead, he was fined 20 percent of his purse, which went to Rafael dos Anjos.

A middleweight bout between Ed Herman and Derek Brunson, slated for the televised preliminary portion of the event, was cancelled on the day of the event, as Brunson was stricken with a stomach ailment. The fight was rescheduled to take place the following month at UFC 183.

== Results ==
Main card (Fox)
Weight class				Method	Round	Time	Notes
Heavyweight	Junior dos Santos	def.	Stipe Miocic	Decision (unanimous) (48–47, 49–46, 49–46)	5	5:00
Catchweight (160.6 lb)	Rafael dos Anjos	def.	Nate Diaz	Decision (unanimous) (30–26, 30–26, 30–27)	3	5:00
Heavyweight	Alistair Overeem	def.	Stefan Struve	KO (punches)	1	4:13
Heavyweight	Matt Mitrione	def.	Gabriel Gonzaga	TKO (punches)	1	1:59
Preliminary card (Fox Sports 1)
Women's Strawweight	Joanna Jędrzejczyk	def.	Cláudia Gadelha	Decision (split) (29–28, 28–29, 29–28)	3	5:00
Flyweight	John Moraga	def.	Willie Gates	Submission (rear-naked choke)	3	4:06
Welterweight	Ben Saunders	def.	Joe Riggs	Submission (neck injury)	1	0:57
Lightweight	Drew Dober	def.	Jamie Varner	Submission (rear-naked choke)	1	1:52
Lightweight	Bryan Barberena	def.	Joe Ellenberger	TKO (elbows and punches)	3	3:24
Preliminary card (UFC Fight Pass)
Lightweight	David Michaud	def.	Garett Whiteley	Decision (unanimous) (29–28, 29–28, 30–27)	3	5:00
Bantamweight	Henry Cejudo	def.	Dustin Kimura	Decision (unanimous) (30–27, 30–27, 30–27)	3	5:00
Bantamweight	Ian Entwistle	def.	Anthony Birchak	Submission (heel hook)	1	1:04	(Note: This bout aired on the Fox Sports 1 prelims broadcast after Saunders vs. Riggs fight.)

== Bonus awards ==
The following fighters were awarded $50,000 bonuses:

- Fight of the Night: Junior dos Santos vs. Stipe Miocic
- Performance of the Night: Matt Mitrione and Ian Entwistle

== Reported payout ==
The following is the reported payout to the fighters as reported to the Arizona Boxing and MMA Commission. It does not include sponsor money and also does not include the UFC's traditional "fight night" bonuses.

- Junior dos Santos: $260,000 (includes $130,000 win bonus) def. Stipe Miocic: $30,000
- Rafael dos Anjos: $86,000 (includes $41,000 win bonus) def. Nate Diaz: $16,000 ^
- Alistair Overeem: $150,000 (includes $50,000 win bonus) def. Stefan Struve: $40,000
- Matt Mitrione: $66,000 (includes $33,000 win bonus) def. Gabriel Gonzaga: $38,000
- Joanna Jędrzejczyk: $20,000 (includes $10,000 win bonus) def. Cláudia Gadelha: $10,000
- John Moraga: $50,000 (includes $25,000 win bonus) def. Willie Gates: $8,000
- Ben Saunders: $28,000 (includes $14,000 win bonus) def. Joe Riggs: $16,000
- Drew Dober: $16,000 (includes $8,000 win bonus) def. Jamie Varner: $20,000
- Ed Herman: $47,000 vs. Derek Brunson: N/A <
- Bryan Barberena: $16,000 (includes $8,000 win bonus) def. Joe Ellenberger: $10,000
- David Michaud: $16,000 (includes $8,000 win bonus) def. Garrett Whiteley: $8,000
- Henry Cejudo: $30,000 (includes $15,000 win bonus) def. Dustin Kimura: $15,000
- Ian Entwistle: $16,000 (includes $8,000 win bonus) def. Anthony Birchak: $8,000

^ Diaz was fined $4,000, 20 percent of his purse for failing to make the required weight for his fight with Rafael dos Anjos. That money was issued to Dos Anjos, officials confirmed.
< Bout did not take place as Brunson was unable to compete after becoming ill the day of the fight. Herman was paid his show money.

== See also ==
- List of UFC events
- 2014 in UFC
