= Nikolas Motta =

Brazilian mixed martial artist

- Born: February 8, 1993 (age 33); Governador Valadares, Minas Gerais, Brazil
- Other names: Iron
- Height: 5 ft 9 in (1.75 m)
- Weight: 155 lb (70 kg; 11 st 1 lb)
- Division: Lightweight
- Reach: 71 in (180 cm)
- Team: Xtreme Couture
- Years active: 2012–present

Mixed martial arts record
- Total: 23
- Wins: 15
- By knockout: 10
- By submission: 0
- By decision: 5
- Losses: 7
- By knockout: 5
- By submission: 1
- By decision: 1
- No contests: 1

Other information
- Mixed martial arts record from Sherdog

Nikolas Motta (born February 8, 1993) is a Brazilian mixed martial artist. He currently competes in the lightweight division of the Ultimate Fighting Championship (UFC).

== Early life ==
Motta grew up in Minas Gerais, where he started training kickboxing at age 13. After Motta completed high school, he opted out of going to university despite his family's wishes, to pursue mixed martial arts full time. At 18, Motta moved 9 hours away from home to Rio de Janeiro to join his coach Andre Pederneiras.

== Early career ==
Motta made his professional mixed martial arts debut in May 2012 at Watch Out Combat Show 19, defeating Caiubi Ajala da Silva via technical knockout in the first round. Over the next four years, he competed mostly on the Brazilian regional circuit, best known for Shooto Brasil, compiling a 7–2 professional record.

=== The Ultimate Fighter: Brazil 4 ===
In early 2015, Motta was selected as one of the 16 lightweight contestants for The Ultimate Fighter: Brazil 4. In the elimination round to enter the fighter house, he defeated Alexandre Cidade via unanimous decision. In the quarterfinal round, Motta was eliminated from the tournament after losing via second-round rear-naked choke to eventual season winner Glaico França.

=== Regional titles and CFFC ===
After competing on The Ultimate Fighter, Motta returned to the regional scene and subsequently relocated his training base to the United States. In July 2018 at 864 Fighting Championship 5, he secured a third-round knockout victory against future UFC competitor Joe Solecki.

Motta then signed with Cage Fury Fighting Championships (CFFC). He made his promotional debut at CFFC 77 in August 2019, defeating Cesar Balmaceda via first-round knockout in 54 seconds. On November 16, 2019, Motta faced Juan Gonzalez for the vacant CFFC Lightweight Championship at CFFC 79, winning the belt via unanimous decision over five rounds.

=== Dana White's Contender Series ===
On November 10, 2020, Motta appeared on Dana White's Contender Series 35, facing Joseph Lowry. Motta won the fight via unanimous decision and was awarded an official UFC contract.

=== Ultimate Fighting Championship ===
Motta was scheduled to face Damir Hadžović on May 8, 2021, at UFC on ESPN 24. However, Motta was pulled out from the event, citing foot injury.

Motta was scheduled to make his promotional debut against veteran Jim Miller on September 18, 2021, at UFC Fight Night 192. However, a week before the event, Miller pulled out from the event after tested positive for COVID-19 and was replaced by Cameron VanCamp. In turn, the bout was scrapped in the days leading up to the event due to an undisclosed injury to one of the participants.

Finally, Motta made his UFC debut against Miller on February 19, 2022, at UFC Fight Night 201. He lost the fight via TKO in round two.

Motta was scheduled to face Cameron VanCamp on September 10, 2022, at UFC 279, but the bout eventually pushed back to UFC Fight Night 210 on September 17, 2022, as the promotion adjusted its schedule in June. He won the fight via technical knockout in round one.

Motta was scheduled to face Ignacio Bahamondes on April 8, 2023, at UFC 287. However, Motta pulled out in late March due to a cut on his head and was replaced by Trey Ogden.

Motta faced Manuel Torres on June 17, 2023, at UFC Fight Night 226. He lost the fight via knockout in round one.

Motta faced Trey Ogden on November 18, 2023, at UFC Fight Night 232. In the third round, referee Mike Beltran prematurely stopped the fight while Ogden was applying an arm-triangle choke, mistakenly believing Motta was unconscious. Because Motta was conscious and immediately protested the stoppage, the bout officially overturned the initial submission result to a no contest.

Motta faced Tom Nolan on January 13, 2024, at UFC Fight Night 234. He won the fight via technical knockout in round one.

Motta was scheduled to face Ľudovít Klein on September 28, 2024, at UFC Fight Night 243. However, Motta withdrew for unknown reasons and was replaced by Roosevelt Roberts.

Motta faced Maheshate Hayisaer on November 23, 2024, at UFC Fight Night 248. He won the fight via unanimous decision.

Motta faced Nazim Sadykhov on June 21, 2025, at UFC on ABC 8. He lost the fight via technical knockout in round two. This fight earned him two $50,000 awards (Performance of the Night and Fight of the Night) totaling $100,000.

Motta faced Dom Mar Fan on November 21, 2026 at UFC Fight Night 294. He lost the fight by unanimous decision.

== Championships and accomplishments ==
- Cage Fury Fighting Championships
  - CFFC Lightweight Championship (One time, former)
- Ultimate Fighting Championship
  - Fight of the Night (One time) vs. Nazim Sadykhov
  - Performance of the Night (One time) vs. Nazim Sadykhov
  - UFC Honors Awards
    - 2025: President's Choice Fight of the Year Nominee vs. Nazim Sadykhov
  - UFC.com Awards
    - 2025: Ranked #3 Fight of the Year vs. Nazim Sadykhov
- MMA Fighting
  - 2025 #4 Ranked Fight of the Year vs. Nazim Sadykhov

== Mixed martial arts record ==
Professional record breakdown
23 matches	15 wins	7 losses
By knockout	10	5
By submission	0	1
By decision	5	1
Draws	0	
No contests	1	

Res.	Record	Opponent	Method	Event	Date	Round	Time	Location	Notes
Loss	15–7 (1)	Dom Mar Fan	Decision (unanimous)	UFC Fight Night: Procházka vs. Stirling	November 21, 2026	3	5:00	Al Rayyan, Qatar	
Loss	15–6 (1)	Nazim Sadykhov	TKO (punches)	UFC on ABC: Hill vs. Rountree Jr.	June 21, 2025	2	4:17	Baku, Azerbaijan	Performance of the Night. Fight of the Night.
Win	15–5 (1)	Maheshate Hayisaer	Decision (unanimous)	UFC Fight Night: Yan vs. Figueiredo	November 23, 2024	3	5:00	Macau, China	
Win	14–5 (1)	Tom Nolan	TKO (punches)	UFC Fight Night: Ankalaev vs. Walker 2	January 13, 2024	1	1:03	Las Vegas, Nevada, United States	
NC	13–5 (1)	Trey Ogden	NC (premature stoppage)	UFC Fight Night: Allen vs. Craig	November 18, 2023	3	3:11	Las Vegas, Nevada, United States	Originally a technical submission (arm-triangle choke) win for Ogden; overturned after review due to a referee error.
Loss	13–5	Manuel Torres	KO (elbow)	UFC on ESPN: Vettori vs. Cannonier	June 17, 2023	1	1:50	Las Vegas, Nevada, United States	
Win	13–4	Cameron VanCamp	TKO (punches)	UFC Fight Night: Sandhagen vs. Song	September 17, 2022	1	3:49	Las Vegas, Nevada, United States	
Loss	12–4	Jim Miller	TKO (punches)	UFC Fight Night: Walker vs. Hill	February 19, 2022	2	1:58	Las Vegas, Nevada, United States	
Win	12–3	Joseph Lowry	Decision (unanimous)	Dana White's Contender Series 35	November 10, 2020	3	5:00	Las Vegas, Nevada, United States	
Win	11–3	Juan Gonzalez	Decision (unanimous)	Cage Fury FC 79	November 16, 2019	4	5:00	Atlantic City, New Jersey, United States	Won the vacant Cage Fury FC Lightweight Championship.
Win	10–3	Cesar Balmaceda	KO (punch)	Cage Fury FC 77	August 16, 2019	1	0:54	Atlantic City, New Jersey, United States	Catchweight (160 lb) bout.
Loss	9–3	Robert Hale	TKO (punches)	864 FC 9	November 30, 2018	1	2:46	Duluth, Georgia, United States	
Win	9–2	Joe Solecki	KO (punches)	864 FC 5	July 21, 2018	3	1:08	Greenville, South Carolina, United States	Catchweight (159 lb) bout.
Win	8–2	Paulo Machado	TKO (punches)	Shooto Brazil 68	December 18, 2016	2	2:35	Brasília, Brazil	
Loss	7–2	Antônio Carlos Ribeiro	TKO (punches)	Shooto Brazil 63	May 22, 2016	1	1:08	Rio de Janeiro, Brazil	Catchweight (150 lb) bout.
Win	7–1	Eliel Topete Dourado	Decision (unanimous)	Shooto Brazil 58	October 18, 2015	3	5:00	Rio de Janeiro, Brazil	Lightweight debut.
Win	6–1	Jaciel de Souza Lima	TKO (punches)	Shooto Brazil 50	October 3, 2014	1	3:43	Rio Bonito, Brazil	
Win	5–1	Arlisson Leandro	KO (punches)	Bitetti Combat 20	June 7, 2014	1	4:02	Armação dos Búzios, Brazil	
Win	4–1	Rafael Mota	TKO (head kick and punches)	Shooto Brazil 45	December 20, 2013	1	1:28	Rio de Janeiro, Brazil	
Win	3–1	Pety Maffort	Decision (unanimous)	Shooto Brazil 42	August 25, 2013	3	5:00	Rio de Janeiro, Brazil	
Loss	2–1	Claudio Marcelino	Submission (guillotine choke)	Shooto Brazil 38	April 19, 2013	2	1:53	Rio de Janeiro, Brazil	
Win	2–0	Francisco Moicano	KO (punch)	Shooto Brazil 35	October 20, 2012	1	2:48	Rio de Janeiro, Brazil	
Win	1–0	Caiubi Ajala da Silva	TKO (punches)	Watch Out Combat Show 19	May 18, 2012	1	1:25	Rio de Janeiro, Brazil	Featherweight debut.

== Mixed martial arts exhibition record ==
Exhibition record breakdown		
2 matches	1 win	1 loss
By submission	0	1
By decision	1	0

Res.	Record	Opponent	Method	Event	Date	Round	Time	Location	Notes
Loss	1–1	Glaico França	Submission (rear-naked choke)	The Ultimate Fighter: Brazil 4	May 18, 2015	2	0:34	Las Vegas, Nevada, United States	The Ultimate Fighter: Brazil 4 Quarter-final round.
Win	1–0	Alexandre Cidade	Decision (unanimous)	The Ultimate Fighter: Brazil 4	April 20, 2015	2	5:00	Las Vegas, Nevada, United States	The Ultimate Fighter: Brazil 4 Elimination round.

== See also ==
- List of current UFC fighters
- List of male mixed martial artists
