= Green Valley High School =

Green Valley High School may refer to:

- Green Valley High School (Nevada), Henderson, Nevada
- Green Valley High School (California), Yucaipa, California
