= Jamie Little =

American sportscaster

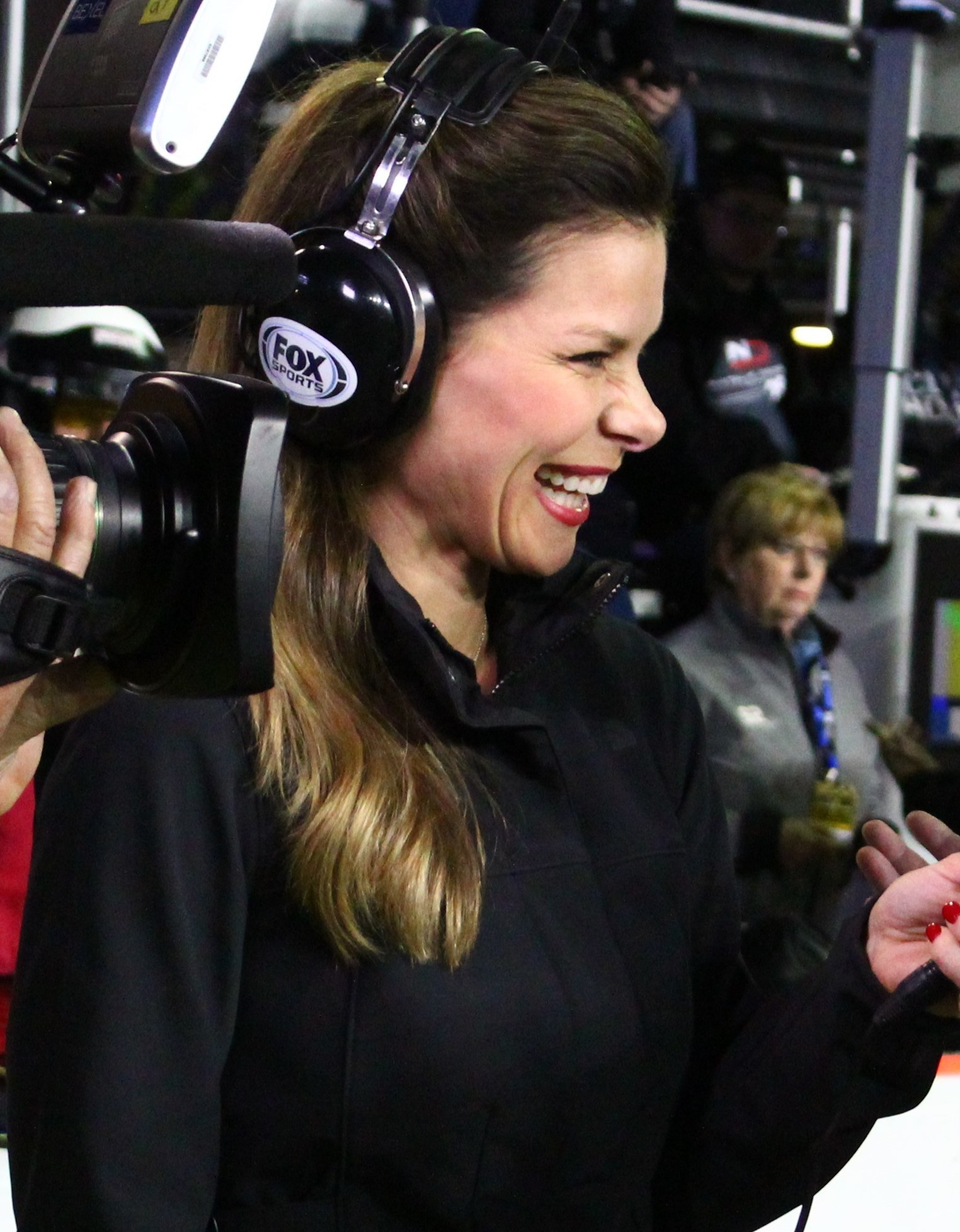
- Jamie Little at the Daytona International Speedway in Florida in 2019
- Born: April 9, 1978 (age 48); South Lake Tahoe, California, U.S.
- Occupations: Sportscaster, sports reporter, NASCAR reporter, television personality
- Height: 5 ft 10 in (178 cm)
- Spouse: Cody Selman (m. 2010)
- Children: 2

Jamie Little (born April 9, 1978) is an American pit reporter and play by play announcer for NASCAR coverage on Fox. Little is a former pit reporter for ESPN/ABC coverage of the Indy Racing League, although she returned to her pit reporting duty for the 2007 and 2008 Indianapolis 500 as well as the 2013 Firestone 550, and NASCAR on ESPN. Little joined ESPN in 1998 and covered both the Winter and Summer X Games. She is well known among the motocross and extreme sports community for being a pit reporter on ESPN's Motoworld program. Little won the 2008 Toyota Pro/Celebrity Race, edging out Craftsman Truck Series champion Mike Skinner by 0.324 seconds.

Little returned to the Winter X Games in January 2010, covering the Snowmobile Motocross. She also returned to her hosting duties for ESPN's second annual New Years, No Limits special on New Year's Eve. During the 2011 INDYCAR season, she was assigned to travel to the trauma centre after Dan Wheldon's fatal crash.

On September 25, 2014, it was announced that Little would move to Fox Sports beginning in January 2015 to serve as a pit reporter for NASCAR Cup Series, Xfinity Series and Craftsman Truck Series races.

In 2021, Little began serving as the lead play-by-play announcer for Fox Sports' coverage of the ARCA Menards Series. She is the first woman to be the lead television play-by-play announcer for a national motorsports series.

Coincidentally, in May 2026, nearly five years after she was sent to the UNLV trauma centre for Dan Wheldon's death, she was on the call at Dover Motor Speedway for Kyle Busch's final career national NASCAR win, less than a week before his death.

== Personal life ==
Little attended Greenspun Junior High School and graduated eighth grade in 1992. Attended Green Valley High School. She is a 2001 graduate of San Diego State University.

In December 2010, Little married Cody Selman in La Jolla, California. On August 9, 2012, she gave birth to a boy, Carter Wayne Selman. On October 24, 2016, Jamie and Cody welcomed daughter Sierra Lynn Selman. Little and her family live in Carmel, Indiana.

Selman and Little used to own two Jimmy John's franchises in Las Vegas, however Little confirmed in 2024 she sold them. They own numerous franchises in Indianapolis, Indiana, in addition to a rental property in Tennessee.
