= UFC Fight Night: Lewis vs. Oleinik =

UFC mixed martial arts event in 2020

- The poster for UFC Fight Night: Lewis vs. Oleinik
- Promotion: Ultimate Fighting Championship
- Date: August 8, 2020
- Venue: UFC Apex
- City: Enterprise, Nevada, United States
- Attendance: None (behind closed doors)

Event chronology
UFC Fight Night: Brunson vs. Shahbazyan	UFC Fight Night: Lewis vs. Oleinik	UFC 252: Miocic vs. Cormier 3

UFC Fight Night: Lewis vs. Oleinik (also known as UFC Fight Night 174, UFC on ESPN+ 32 and UFC Vegas 6) was a mixed martial arts event produced by the Ultimate Fighting Championship on August 8, 2020 at the UFC Apex facility in Enterprise, Nevada, part of the Las Vegas Metropolitan Area, United States.

== Background ==
A heavyweight bout between former UFC Heavyweight Championship challenger Derrick Lewis and Aleksei Oleinik took place as the event headliner.

A women's bantamweight bout between former UFC Women's Flyweight Champion Nicco Montaño and Julia Avila was originally scheduled for the event. However, the bout was rescheduled for UFC Fight Night: Overeem vs. Sakai after Montaño's coach, John Wood, tested positive for COVID-19.

A women's bantamweight bout between Ketlen Vieira and former Invicta FC Bantamweight Champion and UFC Women's Featherweight Championship challenger Yana Kunitskaya was originally scheduled for a week earlier at UFC Fight Night: Brunson vs. Shahbazyan. However, it eventually moved to this event instead. Subsequently, Vieira was removed from the card on July 30 due to visa issues and replaced by returning veteran Julija Stoliarenko, who was the current Invicta FC Bantamweight Champion. Vieira was then expected to face a different opponent at UFC Fight Night: Waterson vs. Hill on September 12.

A heavyweight bout between Sergei Pavlovich and Ciryl Gane was expected to take place at this event. However, Pavlovich pulled out on July 15 due to an old knee injury that required surgery. He was replaced by Shamil Abdurakhimov and the bout moved to UFC 253. Gane and Abdurakhimov were originally scheduled for UFC 249, but Gane was forced to pull out of the event after he was struck by a pneumothorax in training. Subsequently, the bout would be rescheduled for UFC 251. However, it was then cancelled a second time as Abdurakhimov was removed from the card for undisclosed reasons.

A featherweight bout between Steve Garcia and Peter Barrett was scheduled for the event, but Garcia withdrew from the bout for an undisclosed reason on July 25 and was replaced by Youssef Zalal.

A couple of fights, including a women's strawweight bout between Nadia Kassem and Miranda Granger, as well as a featherweight bout between Alex Caceres and Giga Chikadze were expected to take place at this event. However, they never made it to the final card for unknown reasons.

At the weigh-ins, Beneil Dariush and Laureano Staropoli missed weight for their respective bouts. Dariush weighed in at 158 pounds, two pounds over the lightweight non-title fight limit. Staropoli weighed in at 174.5 pounds, three and a half pounds over the welterweight non-title fight limit. Both of their bouts proceeded at a catchweight and they were each fined 20% of their individual purses, which went to their opponents Scott Holtzman and Tim Means (Means was given one additional hour to make weight after initially weighing 172.5 pounds).

== Results ==
Main card (ESPN+)
Weight class				Method	Round	Time	Notes
Heavyweight	Derrick Lewis	def.	Aleksei Oleinik	TKO (punches)	2	0:21
Middleweight	Chris Weidman	def.	Omari Akhmedov	Decision (unanimous) (29–27, 29–27, 29–28)	3	5:00
Middleweight	Darren Stewart	def.	Maki Pitolo	Submission (guillotine choke)	1	3:41
Women's Bantamweight	Yana Kunitskaya	def.	Julija Stoliarenko	Decision (unanimous) (30–26, 30–27, 30–27)	3	5:00
Catchweight (158 lb)	Beneil Dariush	def.	Scott Holtzman	KO (spinning backfist)	1	4:38
Preliminary card (ESPN+)
Catchweight (174.5 lb)	Tim Means	def.	Laureano Staropoli	Decision (unanimous) (30–27, 29–28, 29–28)	3	5:00
Middleweight	Kevin Holland	def.	Joaquin Buckley	TKO (punches)	3	0:32
Lightweight	Nasrat Haqparast	def.	Alexander Muñoz	Decision (unanimous) (30–27, 30–27, 30–27)	3	5:00
Middleweight	Andrew Sanchez	def.	Wellington Turman	KO (punch)	1	4:14
Featherweight	Gavin Tucker	def.	Justin Jaynes	Submission (rear-naked choke)	3	1:43
Featherweight	Youssef Zalal	def.	Peter Barrett	Decision (unanimous) (30–26, 30–26, 30–27)	3	5:00
Bantamweight	Irwin Rivera	def.	Ali AlQaisi	Decision (split) (29–28, 28–29, 29–28)	3	5:00

== Bonus awards ==
The following fighters received $50,000 bonuses.

- Fight of the Night: No bonus awarded.
- Performance of the Night: Darren Stewart, Kevin Holland, Andrew Sanchez and Gavin Tucker

== See also ==
- List of UFC events
- List of current UFC fighters
- 2020 in UFC
