= Manuel Torres (fighter) =

Mexican mixed martial artist (born 1995)

- Born: Manuel Roberto Torres Cano; March 25, 1995 (age 31); Chihuahua, Mexico
- Other names: El Loco
- Height: 5 ft 10 in (1.78 m)
- Weight: 155 lb (70 kg; 11 st 1 lb)
- Division: Lightweight
- Reach: 73.5 in (187 cm)
- Stance: Orthodox
- Fighting out of: Tijuana, Baja California, Mexico
- Team: Aldama's Muay Thai Gym
- Years active: 2014–present

Mixed martial arts record
- Total: 21
- Wins: 17
- By knockout: 9
- By submission: 7
- By decision: 1
- Losses: 4
- By knockout: 2
- By submission: 2

Other information
- Mixed martial arts record from Sherdog

Manuel Roberto Torres Cano (born March 25, 1995) is a Mexican professional mixed martial artist who currently competes in the Lightweight division of Ultimate Fighting Championship (UFC).

== Mixed martial arts career ==
=== Early career ===
He began his professional MMA career in May 2014, and over the next four years, he had amassed an undefeated record of 8–0. His debut was a first-round TKO victory over Ever Alvarado at the WBS 2 World Best Gladiators event.

On November 3, 2018, Torres lost his undefeated record to Mahatma García at Hardcore Fighter 3 via submission after being submitted by a heel hook.

Torres faced Kolton Englund on October 26, 2021, at season 5 of DWCS. He won the fight via first-round TKO and secured a UFC contract.

=== Ultimate Fighting Championship ===
Torres made his promotional debut against Frank Camacho on May 14, 2022, at UFC on ESPN 36. He won the fight via second-round TKO. This victory earned him Performance of the Night honors.

Torres was scheduled to face Trey Ogden on March 25, 2023, at UFC on ESPN 43. However, the bout was cancelled the day before due to Torres suffering a medical issue.

Torres faced Nikolas Motta on June 17, 2023, at UFC on ESPN 47. He won the fight via knockout after finishing Motta with a first-round elbow. This victory earned him his second Performance of the Night honor.

Torres faced Chris Duncan on February 24, 2024, at UFC Fight Night 237. He won the fight via first-round submission. This victory earned him Performance of the Night honors for the third consecutive year.

Torres faced Ignacio Bahamondes on September 14, 2024, at UFC 306. He lost the fight via TKO in the first round.

Torres faced Drew Dober on March 29, 2025, at UFC on ESPN 64. He won the fight via TKO in the first round. This victory earned him a Performance of the Night award for the fourth consecutive year.

Torres faced Grant Dawson on December 6, 2025, at UFC 323. He won the fight by technical knockout in the first round. This fight earned him another Performance of the Night award.

Torres was scheduled to face Beneil Dariush on April 11, 2026, at UFC 327. However, Torres withdrew due to an injury.

Torres faced Rafael Fiziev on June 27, 2026 in the main event at UFC Fight Night 280. He lost the fight by knockout via a spinning wheel kick and punches in the second round.

== Championships and accomplishments ==
- Ultimate Fighting Championship
  - Performance of the Night (Five times) vs. Frank Camacho, Nikolas Motta, Chris Duncan, Drew Dober and Grant Dawson
  - Second shortest average time in UFC Lightweight division history (2:34)
  - Most knockdowns-per-fifteen minutes in UFC Lightweight division history (3.51)
  - Third most significant strikes landed per minute in UFC Lightweight division history (7.25)
  - Fourth highest striking differential in UFC Lightweight division history (2.73)
- Beat Down MMA
  - BDMMA Featherweight Championship (One time)
  - BDMMA Featherweight Grand Prix winner

== Mixed martial arts record ==
Professional record breakdown
21 matches	17 wins	4 losses
By knockout	9	2
By submission	7	2
By decision	1	0

Res.	Record	Opponent	Method	Event	Date	Round	Time	Location	Notes
Loss	17–4	Rafael Fiziev	KO (spinning wheel kick and punches)	UFC Fight Night: Fiziev vs. Torres	June 27, 2026	2	0:15	Baku, Azerbaijan	
Win	17–3	Grant Dawson	TKO (punches)	UFC 323	December 6, 2025	1	2:25	Las Vegas, Nevada, United States	Performance of the Night.
Win	16–3	Drew Dober	TKO (punches)	UFC on ESPN: Moreno vs. Erceg	March 29, 2025	1	1:45	Mexico City, Mexico	Performance of the Night.
Loss	15–3	Ignacio Bahamondes	TKO (punches)	UFC 306	September 14, 2024	1	4:02	Las Vegas, Nevada, United States	
Win	15–2	Chris Duncan	Submission (rear-naked choke)	UFC Fight Night: Moreno vs. Royval 2	February 24, 2024	1	1:46	Mexico City, Mexico	Performance of the Night.
Win	14–2	Nikolas Motta	KO (elbow)	UFC on ESPN: Vettori vs. Cannonier	June 17, 2023	1	1:50	Las Vegas, Nevada, United States	Performance of the Night.
Win	13–2	Frank Camacho	TKO (punches)	UFC on ESPN: Błachowicz vs. Rakić	May 14, 2022	1	3:27	Las Vegas, Nevada, United States	Performance of the Night.
Win	12–2	Kolton Englund	TKO (punches)	Dana White's Contender Series 45	October 26, 2021	1	2:10	Las Vegas, Nevada, United States	
Win	11–2	Carlos Canada	Submission (guillotine choke)	UWC Mexico 27	June 11, 2021	1	0:25	Tijuana, Mexico	
Win	10–2	Daniel Vega	Submission (rear-naked choke)	RRR Promotions: El Combate 6	March 14, 2020	1	1:03	Chihuahua City, Mexico	Won the RRR Featherweight Championship.
Loss	9–2	Carlos Calvo	Submission (kneebar)	Crixus MMA 01	September 12, 2019	1	1:23	Tijuana, Mexico	Lightweight debut.
Win	9–1	Luis Cervantes	Submission (rear-naked choke)	Hardcore Fighter 4	February 23, 2019	1	0:53	Cancún, Mexico	
Loss	8–1	Mahatma García	Submission (heel hook)	Hardcore Fighter 3	November 3, 2018	1	0:59	Cancún, Mexico	
Win	8–0	Adonilton Matos	Submission (rear-naked choke)	Beat Down MMA 3	August 18, 2018	1	2:21	Mexico City, Mexico	Won the BDMMA Featherweight Grand Prix and the BDMMA Featherweight Championship.
Win	7–0	Enrique González	Decision (split)	Beat Down MMA 3	August 18, 2018	3	5:00	Mexico City, Mexico	BDMMA Featherweight Grand Prix Semifinal.
Win	6–0	Julio Ramírez	Submission (shoulder choke)	Hardcore Fighter 1	March 23, 2018	1	1:15	Cancún, Mexico	
Win	5–0	Orlando Macías	TKO (punches)	The Art of Fighting: In Search of Glory	September 2, 2017	1	4:21	Guadalajara, Mexico	
Win	4–0	Andrés Baca	KO (body kick)	Red Cage 5	June 11, 2016	1	0:12	Chihuahua City, Mexico	
Win	3–0	Jesús Tejeda	TKO (retirement)	Red Cage 1	August 15, 2015	1	2:07	Chihuahua City, Mexico	Catchweight (141 lb) bout.
Win	2–0	Raúl Armas	Submission (guillotine choke)	World Best Gladiators 8	April 18, 2015	1	0:50	Chihuahua City, Mexico	Catchweight (139 lb) bout.
Win	1–0	Ever Alvarado	TKO (punches)	World Best Gladiators 2	May 24, 2014	1	N/A	Chihuahua City, Mexico	Featherweight debut.

== See also ==
- List of current UFC fighters
- List of Dana White's Contender Series alumni
- List of Mexican UFC fighters
- List of male mixed martial artists
