= Brandyn Dombrowski =

American football player (born 1985)

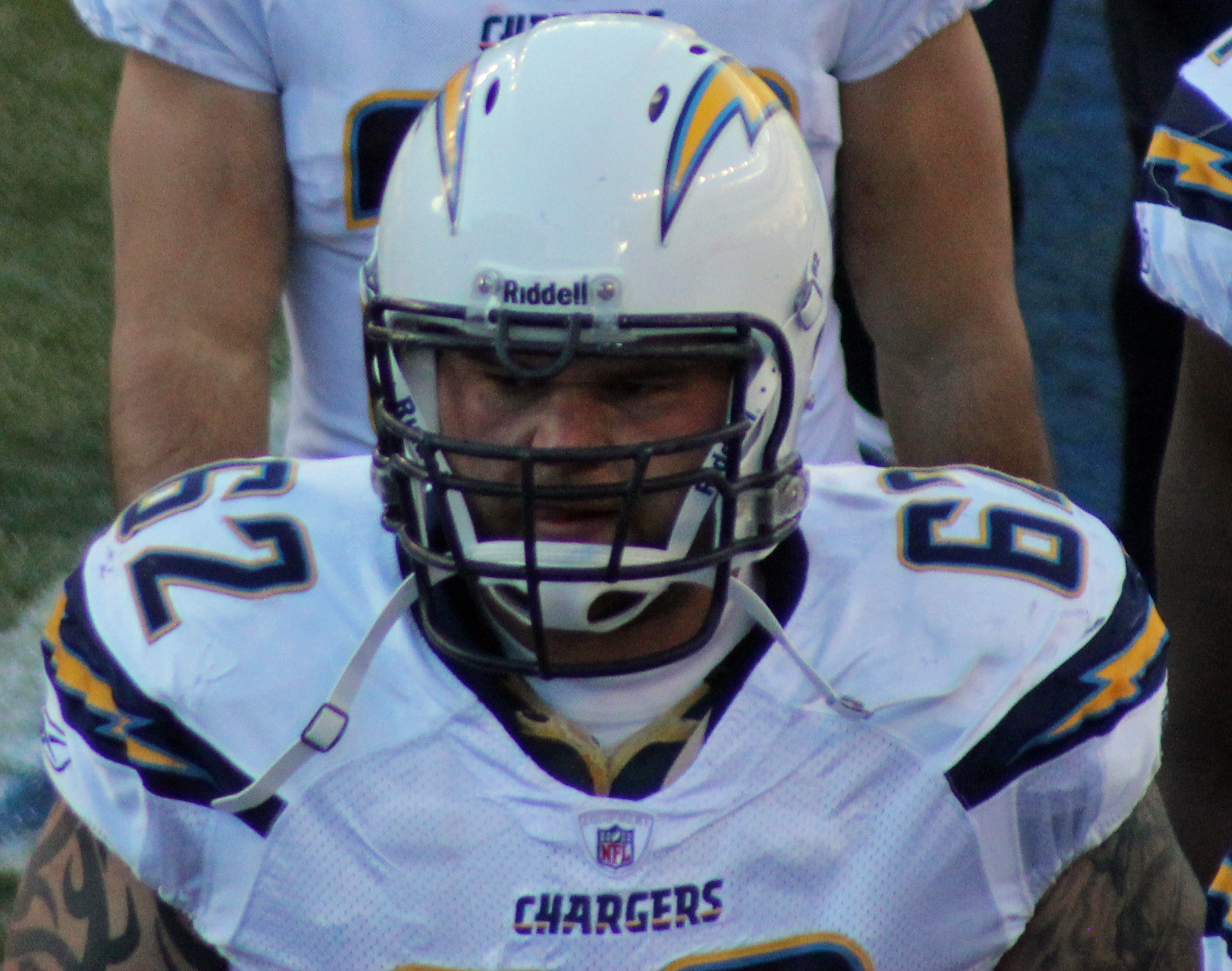
- Dombrowski in 2011

No. 62
- Position: Offensive tackle

Personal information
- Born: April 3, 1985 (age 41); Buffalo, New York, U.S.
- Listed height: 6 ft 5 in (1.96 m)
- Listed weight: 323 lb (147 kg)

Career information
- High school: Green Valley (Henderson, Nevada)
- College: San Diego State
- NFL draft: 2008: undrafted

Career history
- San Diego Chargers (2008−2012); Las Vegas Outlaws (2015)*
- * Offseason or practice squad member only

Career NFL statistics
- Games played: 47
- Games started: 15
- Fumble recoveries: 1
- Stats at Pro Football Reference

Brandyn Dombrowski (born April 3, 1985) is an American former professional football player who was an offensive tackle in the National Football League (NFL). He was signed by the San Diego Chargers as an undrafted free agent in 2008. He played college football for the San Diego State Aztecs.

== Professional career ==
=== San Diego Chargers ===
Dombrowski spent his rookie season as a practice squad player. 2009 marked his first year as a starter, Dombrowski played in his first career game at right guard against the Oakland Raiders. He started week 2 against the Ravens for his first career start in place of the injured rookie Louis Vasquez. He has also practiced at both left and right tackle. Dombrowski was named the starting Left Tackle for the 2010 season. On August 25, 2013, he was cut by the Chargers.

=== Las Vegas Outlaws ===
On February 9, 2015, Dombrowski was assigned to the Las Vegas Outlaws of the Arena Football League (AFL).

== Early life ==
Dombrowski graduated from Green Valley High School in Henderson, Nevada in 2003 where he also played football.
