= Frank Camacho =

Chamorro mixed martial artist

- Born: Franklin Beldad Camacho; May 18, 1989 (age 37); Hagåtña, Guam
- Other names: The Crank
- Nationality: Mariana (Overseas American)
- Height: 5 ft 10 in (1.78 m)
- Weight: 70.3 kg (155 lb; 11 st 1 lb)
- Division: Welterweight (2014, 2016–2018); Lightweight (2005–2016, 2017, 2019–present)
- Reach: 73 in (190 cm)
- Style: Wrestling, Boxing, Brazilian Jiu-Jitsu
- Fighting out of: Saipan, Northern Mariana Islands
- Team: Spike 22; Purebred Jiu-Jitsu; Trench Tech
- Rank: Brown belt in Brazilian Jiu-Jitsu under Steve Roberto
- Years active: 2005–present

Mixed martial arts record
- Total: 32
- Wins: 22
- By knockout: 17
- By submission: 2
- By decision: 3
- Losses: 10
- By knockout: 6
- By submission: 2
- By decision: 2

Other information
- Mixed martial arts record from Sherdog

Franklin Beldad Camacho (born May 18, 1989) is a Chamorro mixed martial artist in the lightweight division. He was a 2010 Blue Belt Brazilian Jiu-Jitsu World champion and a 2006 Micronesian Games wrestling gold medalist. He competed in the Ultimate Fighting Championship (UFC).

== Background ==
Camacho was born in Guam to Marcia and Francisco Muña Camacho. He was raised in Saipan, Northern Mariana Islands, where he is still based. He started playing golf at a young age in hopes of competing professionally one day. However, he moved his attention to mixed martial arts (MMA), to shed some weight and get in shape, after watching UFC and Pride Fighting Championships events on television. He started training in MMA when he was fifteen years old, under the supervision of Tetsuji Kato and Cuki Alvarez of Trench Tech Purebred in Saipan. He competed in his first professional fight one year later.

== Mixed martial arts career ==
=== Early career ===
Camacho competed mainly within and around the Pacific Rim, particularly Saipan and Guam, under promotions, such as Pacific Xtreme Combat, Rites of Passage, and Trench Warz. He maintained a 20–4 record prior to entering in the Ultimate Fighting Champion (UFC).

=== The Ultimate Fighter 16 ===
Camacho was a participant in The Ultimate Fighter: Team Carwin vs. Team Nelson in 2012, which was the sixteenth main installment of UFC-produced reality television series The Ultimate Fighter (TUF). In his entry-round match against Neil Magny, he lost via unanimous decision and was eliminated from the competition.

=== Ultimate Fighting Championship ===
Four years after his appearance in TUF 16, Camacho received an opportunity to compete in the Ultimate Fighting Champion (UFC), replacing an injured Jonathan Meunier. He made his debut in the match against Li Jingliang during UFC Fight Night: Holm vs. Correia on June 17, 2017. Camacho lost the fight via unanimous decision, and earned his first UFC Fight of the Night bonus award.

Camacho faced Damien Brown in a lightweight bout during UFC Fight Night: Werdum vs. Tybura on November 19, 2017. Camacho weighed in at 160 pounds during weigh-ins, making him four pounds over the lightweight upper limit of 156 pounds. The bout proceeded as a catchweight and he forfeited 30% of his purse to Brown. He won the fight via split decision. This win earned him his second Fight of the Night bonus award. Camacho took to Twitter after the match, asking UFC President Dana White to give his US$50,000 bonus prize to Brown. Camacho believed he was not eligible for the prize because he did not meet the weight requirement for the division. Camacho became one of five fighters in UFC history to earn back-to-back Fight of the Night awards to start off their UFC career.

Camacho faced Drew Dober during UFC on Fox: Jacaré vs. Brunson 2 on January 27, 2018. He lost the fight via unanimous decision. This fight earned him his third Fight of the Night bonus award in as many fights, making him one of two fighters to start their UFC careers with three consecutive Fight of the Night bonus awards.

Camacho faced Geoff Neal during UFC 228: Woodley vs. Till on September 8, 2018. He lost the fight via knockout.

Camacho faced Nick Hein in a lightweight bout during UFC Fight Night: Gustafsson vs. Smith on June 1, 2019. He won the fight via TKO in the second round.

Camacho faced Beneil Dariush during UFC Fight Night: Maia vs. Askren on October 26, 2019. He lost the fight via submission in round one.

Camacho was billed as a short-notice replacement to face Alan Patrick on April 25, 2020. However, on April 9, Dana White announced that this event was postponed to a future date. Camacho was then scheduled to face Matt Frevola during UFC Fight Night: Blaydes vs. Volkov on June 20, 2020. However, it was revealed on June 18 that Frevola was removed from the bout after one of his cornermen tested positive for COVID-19. Instead, Camacho faced promotional newcomer Justin Jaynes at the event. At the weigh-ins on June 19, Camacho missed weight, coming in at 158 pounds, two pounds over the non-title lightweight limit of 156 pounds. The bout proceeded as a catchweight and Camacho was fined 20% of his purse. Camacho was defeated via first-round technical knockout.

Camacho was scheduled to face Brok Weaver during UFC Fight Night 177 on September 12, 2020. However Camacho was removed from the bout during the week leading up to the fight after testing positive for COVID-19. Weaver instead faced Jalin Turner.

Camacho was scheduled to face Matt Frevola on June 12, 2021, at UFC 263. However, Camacho pulled out of the fight during the week leading up to the event after he was involved in a traffic accident in Orange County, California, that left him with non-life-threatening injuries to his back and neck. In turn, Frevola faced promotional newcomer Terrance McKinney instead.

Camacho faced Manuel Torres on May 14, 2022, at UFC on ESPN 36. He lost the fight via TKO in the second round.

On June 8, 2022, it was confirmed that Camacho was no longer on the UFC roster.

== Personal life ==
Camacho gained his moniker “The Crank” after a fight announcer introduced him by rhyming “crank” with his first name, Frank. Since then, he has opted to keep the name.

Camacho is married to Sarah Filush Camacho. They have a son named Franklin Muña Camacho Jr, another son and a girl Catalina (born 2021).

== Championships and accomplishments ==
=== Mixed martial arts ===
- First International MMA Champion Saipan

Ultimate Fighting Championship

- Fight of the Night (Three times) vs Li Jingliang, Damien Brown and Drew Dober
  - Tied (Yoshihiro Akiyama and Justin Gaethje) for most consecutive Fight of the Night Awards to begin a UFC career (3)
  - UFC.com Awards
    - 2017: Ranked #5 Fight of the Year vs. Damien Brown
    - 2018: Ranked #9 Fight of the Year vs. Drew Dober

=== Brazilian Jiu-Jitsu ===
- 2010 BJJ World Champion
- 2013 European Jiu-Jitsu Championships Silver Medalist
- 2013 Marianas Open Absolute Champion
- New York Jiu-Jitsu Championships Bronze Medalist
- 2014 Marianas Open Brown Belt Open Absolute Winner
- Abu Dhabi Pro Trials Bronze Medallist
- European Jiu-Jitsu championship Silver Medallist
- Pan American BJJ Championship Medallist
- Asia Open BJJ Championship Gold Medallist
- Micronesian Games Wrestling Gold Medallist

== Mixed martial arts record ==
Professional record breakdown
32 matches	22 wins	10 losses
By knockout	17	6
By submission	2	2
By decision	3	2

Res.	Record	Opponent	Method	Event	Date	Round	Time	Location	Notes
Loss	22–10	Manuel Torres	TKO (punches)	UFC on ESPN: Błachowicz vs. Rakić	May 14, 2022	1	3:27	Las Vegas, Nevada, United States	
Loss	22–9	Justin Jaynes	TKO (punches)	UFC on ESPN: Blaydes vs. Volkov	June 20, 2020	1	0:41	Las Vegas, Nevada, United States	Catchweight (158 lb) bout; Camacho missed weight.
Loss	22–8	Beneil Dariush	Submission (rear-naked choke)	UFC Fight Night: Maia vs. Askren	October 26, 2019	1	2:02	Kallang, Singapore	
Win	22–7	Nick Hein	TKO (punches)	UFC Fight Night: Gustafsson vs. Smith	June 1, 2019	2	4:56	Stockholm, Sweden	Return to Lightweight.
Loss	21–7	Geoff Neal	KO (head kick)	UFC 228	September 8, 2018	2	1:23	Dallas, Texas, United States	
Loss	21–6	Drew Dober	Decision (unanimous)	UFC on Fox: Jacaré vs. Brunson 2	January 27, 2018	3	5:00	Charlotte, North Carolina, United States	Fight of the Night.
Win	21–5	Damien Brown	Decision (split)	UFC Fight Night: Werdum vs. Tybura	November 18, 2017	3	5:00	Sydney, Australia	Lightweight bout; Camacho missed weight (160 lb). Fight of the Night.
Loss	20–5	Li Jingliang	Decision (unanimous)	UFC Fight Night: Holm vs. Correia	June 17, 2017	3	5:00	Kallang, Singapore	Fight of the Night.
Win	20–4	Gun Hwan Park	Submission (arm-triangle choke)	Rites of Passage 21	May 26, 2017	2	2:51	Saipan, Northern Mariana Islands	
Win	19–4	Hyun Joo Kim	TKO (punches)	Rites of Passage 20	August 19, 2016	1	3:17	Saipan, Northern Mariana Islands	
Loss	18–4	Han Seul Kim	TKO (punches)	Pacific Xtreme Combat 54	July 8, 2016	1	2:55	Mangilao, Guam	Return to Welterweight.
Win	18–3	Tyrone Jones	TKO (punches)	Pacific Xtreme Combat 50	December 4, 2015	2	2:59	Mangilao, Guam	Won the PXC Lightweight Championship.
Win	17–3	Kengo Ura	KO (punch)	Pacific Xtreme Combat 49	August 7, 2015	1	0:37	Mangilao, Guam	
Win	16–3	Yasuaki Miura	TKO (punches)	Rites of Passage 18	July 3, 2015	1	0:34	Saipan, Northern Mariana Islands	
Loss	15–3	Yusuke Kasuya	Submission (rear-naked choke)	Pacific Xtreme Combat 47	March 13, 2015	1	2:06	Mangilao, Guam	
Win	15–2	Jae Woong Kim	Submission (arm-triangle choke)	Trench Warz 18	December 12, 2014	1	4:38	Saipan, Northern Mariana Islands	Welterweight bout.
Win	14–2	Keita Nakamura	Decision (unanimous)	Pacific Xtreme Combat 42	February 28, 2014	3	5:00	Mangilao, Guam	
Win	13–2	Koshi Matsumoto	KO (punch)	Pacific Xtreme 38	August 9, 2013	3	1:24	Mangilao, Guam	
Win	12–2	James Jones	KO (punch)	UWC 6	April 25, 2009	3	5:00	Fairfax, Virginia, United States	
Loss	11–2	Caloy Baduria	TKO (punches)	URCC 11	November 25, 2007	1	2:27	Pasay, Philippines	
Win	11–1	Ryan Bigler	Decision (split)	URCC 11	November 17, 2007	3	5:00	Mangilao, Guam	
Loss	10–1	Luigi Fioravanti	TKO (doctor stoppage)	PX 12: Settling the Score	July 12, 2007	1	N/A	Mangilao, Guam	
Win	10–0	B.J. Taisacan	TKO (retirement)	Trench Warz 6	June 23, 2007	1	0:37	Saipan, Northern Mariana Islands	
Win	9–0	Carlos Eduardo Santos	TKO (punches)	Geran Haga: Blood Wars 2	May 28, 2007	2	N/A	Agana, Guam	
Win	8–0	Roy Reyes	TKO (knees)	Rites of Passage 2	April 13, 2007	1	0:28	Saipan, Northern Mariana Islands	
Win	7–0	John Ogo	TKO (strikes)	PXC 11	April 13, 2007	1	N/A	Mangilao, Guam	
Win	6–0	Nathan Hanson	KO (punch)	Trench Warz 5	February 24, 2007	1	3:45	Saipan, Northern Mariana Islands	
Win	5–0	Fritz Rodriguez	TKO (punches)	URCC 9	December 2, 2006	1	0:42	Cebu, Philippines	
Win	4–0	Troy Munoz	TKO (punches)	Trench Warz 4	October 28, 2006	1	1:32	Saipan, Northern Mariana Islands	
Win	3–0	Robert Palacios	TKO (punches)	Trench Warz 3	May 27, 2006	1	4:08	Saipan, Northern Mariana Islands	
Win	2–0	Mike Camacho	TKO (knees)	Trench Warz 2	February 11, 2006	1	1:16	Saipan, Northern Mariana Islands	
Win	1–0	Bernie Neth	TKO (submission to slam)	Trench Warz 1	November 26, 2005	1	0:59	Saipan, Northern Mariana Islands	

== See also ==
- List of male mixed martial artists
- Cage Fury Fighting Championships
