= Beneil Dariush =

American mixed martial artist (born 1989)

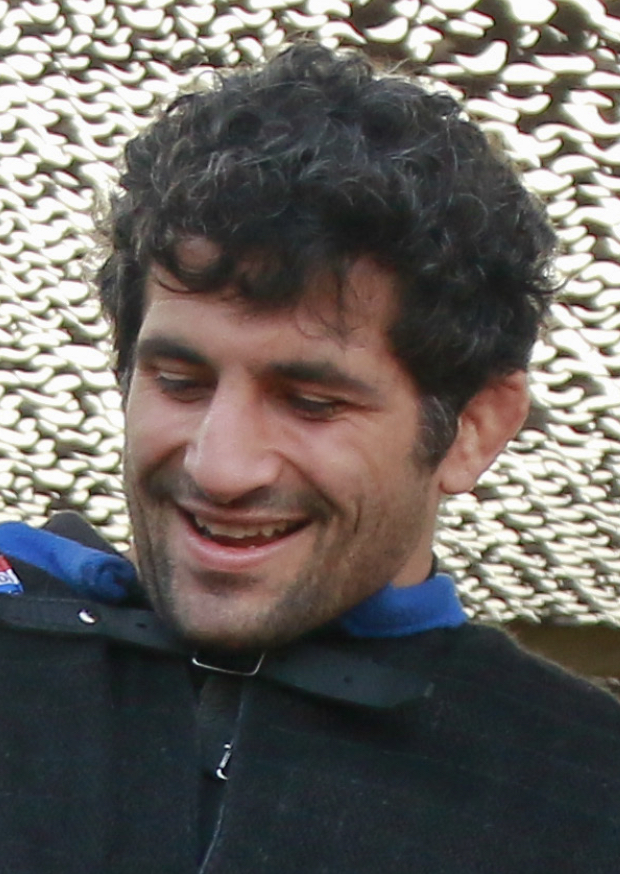
- Dariush in 2018
- Born: Beneil Khobier Dariush; May 6, 1989 (age 37); Urmia, West Azerbaijan, Iran
- Citizenship: United States
- Height: 5 ft 10 in (178 cm)
- Weight: 155 lb (70 kg; 11 st 1 lb)
- Division: Lightweight
- Reach: 72 in (183 cm)
- Style: Brazilian Jiu-Jitsu
- Fighting out of: Yorba Linda, California, U.S.
- Team: Kings MMA
- Trainer: Rafael Cordeiro
- Rank: Black belt in Brazilian Jiu-Jitsu under Rômulo Barral and Bruno "Mamute" Paulista; Black belt in Muay Thai under Rafael Cordeiro
- Years active: 2009–present

Mixed martial arts record
- Total: 32
- Wins: 23
- By knockout: 5
- By submission: 8
- By decision: 10
- Losses: 8
- By knockout: 7
- By submission: 1
- Draws: 1

Other information
- Mixed martial arts record from Sherdog

Beneil Khobier Dariush (Syriac: ܒܢܐܝܠ ܕܪܝܘܫ, Persian: بنیل خوبیر داریوش; born May 6, 1989) is an American professional mixed martial artist. He currently competes in the Lightweight division of the Ultimate Fighting Championship (UFC).

== Background ==
Dariush was born and raised to Christian Assyrian parents on a farm near Urmia, West Azerbaijan Province in Iran. When he was nine, he and his parents left Iran emigrating to America where they already had several relatives from their large extended family. At the time, Beneil and his sister Beraeil did not speak English, so they spent most of the time playing with their cousins.

Dariush is a devout Christian, often making a note of his religious affiliation during UFC media events, promotional work, and post-fight interviews. In keeping with this faith, he sponsors an orphanage and Christian school in Haiti known as the Cap-Haïtien Children's Home.

== Mixed martial arts career ==
=== Early career ===
Dariush began training Brazilian jiu-jitsu in 2007, earning his black belt in just five years. He was a highly decorated competitor, becoming a no gi world champion as a blue, purple, and brown belt.

=== Ultimate Fighting Championship ===
Dariush made his UFC debut on January 15, 2014, at UFC Fight Night 35. He was scheduled to face Jason High. However, High was forced out of the bout with appendicitis and was replaced by returning veteran Charlie Brenneman. Dariush won the fight via submission in the first round.

Dariush returned three months later, losing to Ramsey Nijem by first-round TKO on April 11, 2014, at UFC Fight Night 39.

Dariush was expected to face Anthony Rocco Martin on August 2, 2014, at UFC 176. After the event was canceled, the bout was rescheduled for August 23 at UFC Fight Night 49. Dariush won via submission in the second round.

Dariush made his PPV debut at UFC 179 on October 25, 2014, defeating the undefeated Carlos Diego Ferreira by unanimous decision.

Dariush submitted Daron Cruickshank in the second round on March 14, 2015, at UFC 185, winning his first Performance of the Night bonus award. The bout took place at a catchweight of 157 lbs. as Cruickshank was unable to make the lightweight limit.

Dariush replaced an injured Paul Felder and faced Jim Miller on April 18, 2015, at UFC on Fox 15. He won the bout via unanimous decision.

Dariush next faced Michael Johnson on August 8, 2015, at UFC Fight Night 73. Dariush won the fight via controversial split decision. Every mainstream MMA media outlet scored the fight as a decision victory for Johnson.

Dariush was expected to face Mairbek Taisumov on January 17, 2016, at UFC Fight Night 81. However, Dariush pulled out of the fight in early December citing injury and was replaced by Chris Wade.

Dariush faced Michael Chiesa on April 16, 2016, at UFC on Fox 19. Dariush lost the fight via submission in the second round.

Dariush next faced James Vick on June 4, 2016, at UFC 199, replacing an injured Evan Dunham. Dariush won the fight via KO in the first round.

Dariush faced Rashid Magomedov on November 5, 2016, at The Ultimate Fighter Latin America 3 Finale. He won the fight via unanimous decision.

Dariush faced Edson Barboza on March 11, 2017, at UFC Fight Night 106. He lost the fight via KO due to a flying knee in the second round.

Dariush fought Evan Dunham on October 7, 2017, at UFC 216. The fight ended in a majority draw, with one judge scoring the bout for Dariush.

Dariush was expected to face Bobby Green on March 3, 2018, at UFC 222. However, on February 14, 2018, it was announced that Green was forced to pull out from the event, citing injury. Green was replaced by Alexander Hernandez. Dariush lost the fight via knockout in the first round.

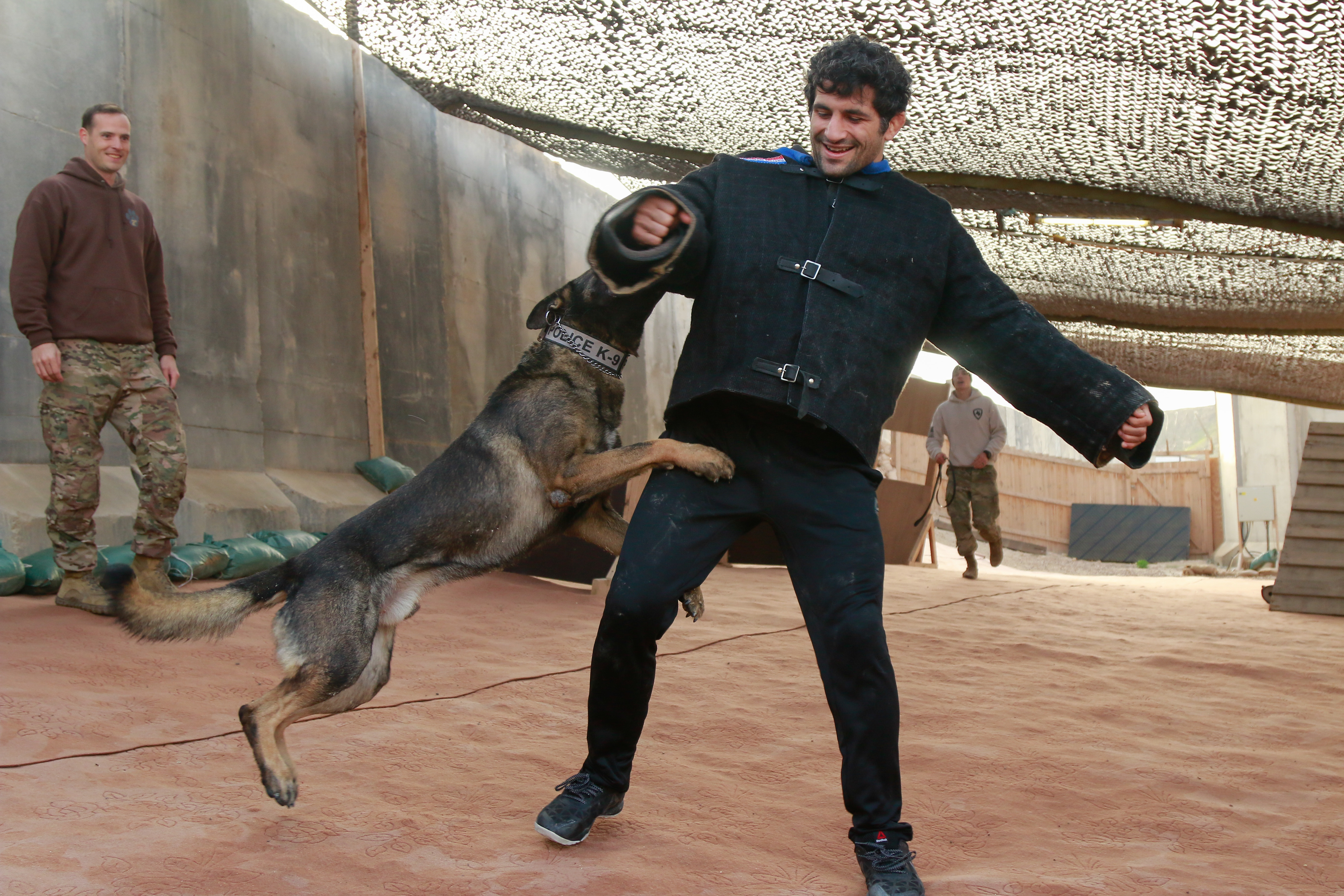
Dariush in bite suit at Al Asad Air Base, Iraq, during MMA Holiday Tour, 2018

Dariush was expected to face Chris Gruetzemacher on November 10, 2018, at UFC Fight Night 139. However, on October 18, 2018, it was reported that Gruetzemacher withdrew from the event and he was replaced by newcomer Thiago Moisés. He won the fight via unanimous decision.

Dariush faced Drew Dober on March 9, 2019, at UFC Fight Night 146. He won the fight via submission in the second round. This win earned him the Performance of the Night award.

Dariush was expected to face Drakkar Klose on July 13, 2019, at UFC Fight Night 155. However, on July 7, Dariush pulled out of the fight with an injury. As a result, UFC officials opted to remove Klose from the card and he is expected to be scheduled for a future event instead.

Dariush faced Frank Camacho on October 26, 2019, at UFC Fight Night 162. He won the fight via submission in round one. This win earned him the Performance of the Night award.

Dariush next faced Drakkar Klose on March 7, 2020, at UFC 248, a rescheduling of the bout that was canceled in July 2019. He won the fight via knockout in the second round. This win earned him his fourth Performance of the Night award.

Dariush faced Scott Holtzman on August 8, 2020, at UFC Fight Night 174. He won the fight via knockout in round one.

Dariush was scheduled to meet Charles Oliveira on October 4, 2020 at UFC on ESPN: Holm vs. Aldana. However, Oliveira pulled out of the fight in early September for undisclosed reasons.

A rematch with Carlos Diego Ferreira took place on February 6, 2021, at UFC Fight Night 184. He won the fight via split decision. This fight earned him the Fight of the Night award.

Dariush faced Tony Ferguson on May 15, 2021, at UFC 262. He won the fight via unanimous decision.

Dariush was scheduled to face Islam Makhachev on February 26, 2022, at UFC Fight Night 202. However, on February 12, it was reported that Dariush withdrew from the event due to an ankle injury.

Dariush faced Mateusz Gamrot on October 22, 2022, at UFC 280. He won the bout by unanimous decision.

Dariush was scheduled to face Charles Oliveira on May 6, 2023, at UFC 288. However, Oliveira was forced out of the event due to injury. The pair was rebooked for June 10, 2023, at UFC 289. Dariush lost the bout in the first round, getting finished with ground and pound.

Dariush faced Arman Tsarukyan on December 2, 2023, at UFC on ESPN 52. He lost the fight via knockout in round one.

On July 15, 2024, it was reported that Dariush has a torn meniscus and is recovering from the injury.

Dariush was scheduled to face Renato Moicano on January 18, 2025, at UFC 311. One day before the event, it was reported that Arman Tsarukyan suffered an injury that forced him to pull out of the main event against Islam Makhachev, and he was replaced by Renato Moicano. Dariush did not compete at this event as a result.

Dariush's bout with Moicano was rescheduled and took place on June 28, 2025, at UFC 317. He won the fight by unanimous decision.

Dariush faced Benoît Saint Denis on November 15, 2025, at UFC 322. At the weigh-ins, Dariush weighed in at 157.2 pounds, 1.2 pounds over the lightweight non-title fight limit. The bout proceeded at catchweight and he was fined 20 percent of his purse, which went to Saint Denis. Dariush lost the fight by knockout sixteen seconds into the first round.

Dariush was scheduled to face Manuel Torres on April 11, 2026, at UFC 327. However, Torres withdrew due to an injury, so Dariush was pulled from the card. Instead, he faced Quillan Salkilld at UFC Fight Night 275 on May 2, 2026. He lost the fight by technical knockout in the first round.

== Fighting style ==
Dariush's approach draws heavily from his background in Brazilian jiu-jitsu. On the ground, Dariush tends to maintain top control and aggressively passes guard to secure a mount position. Dariush has five submission wins by rear naked choke. Dariush has been described by analysts as one of his division's best counter wrestlers, with his win over Gamrot cited as exemplary in this regard. Dariush's jiu-jitsu and counter wrestling help nullify takedown threats, and as such Dariush commits to heavy strikes when on the feet, seen particularly in his overhand left and side kicks.

Dariush has developed a reputation for being chinny, with seven of his eight losses coming by knockout, and all but one in the first round.

== Personal life ==
Due to his efforts with partnering with the Shlama Foundation to raise funds and awareness as well as helping to fund two orphanages in Haiti in partnership with Promise Child Ministries, he was chosen to be honored with the 2024 Forrest Griffin Community Award at the UFC Hall of Fame ceremony on June 27, 2024. Dariush also teaches 8-17 year-olds jiu-jitsu and self-defense at Kings MMA five days a week.

== Championships and accomplishments ==
=== Mixed martial arts ===
- Ultimate Fighting Championship
  - Performance of the Night (Four times) vs. Daron Cruickshank, Drew Dober, Frank Camacho and Drakkar Klose
  - Fight of the Night (One time) vs. Carlos Diego Ferreira
  - Tied (Donald Cerrone) for third most wins in UFC Lightweight division history (17)
  - 2024 Forrest Griffin Community Award
  - UFC Honors Awards
    - 2020: Fan's Choice Comeback of the Year Winner vs. Drakkar Klose
  - UFC.com Awards
    - 2020: Ranked #7 Knockout of the Year vs. Drakkar Klose & Ranked #10 Knockout of the Year vs. Scott Holtzman
    - 2021: Ranked #7 Upset of the Year vs. Tony Ferguson
- Respect in the Cage
  - RITC Lightweight Championship (One time)
  - One successful title defense
- MMA Junkie
  - 2020 March Knockout of the Month vs. Drakkar Klose
  - 2020 August Knockout of the Month vs. Scott Holtzman
- MMA Sucka
  - 2020 Comeback of the Year vs. Drakkar Klose at UFC 248

=== Brazilian jiu-jitsu ===
- Brazilian jiu-jitsu
  - World No Gi Champion (2010 brown, 2009 purple absolute, 2008 blue)
  - World No Gi Championship (2010 brown absolute)
  - Pan American Championship (2009 blue)
  - World Championship 2nd Place (2012 brown, 2010 purple, 2009 blue)
  - Pan American Championship 2nd Place (2010 brown weight & absolute)
  - World Championship 3rd Place (2009 blue absolute)
  - World No Gi Championship 3rd Place (2009 purple)
  - Pan American Championship 3rd Place (2011 brown)

== Mixed martial arts record ==
Professional record breakdown
32 matches	23 wins	8 losses
By knockout	5	7
By submission	8	1
By decision	10	0
Draws	1	

Res.	Record	Opponent	Method	Event	Date	Round	Time	Location	Notes
Loss	23–8–1	Quillan Salkilld	TKO (punches)	UFC Fight Night: Della Maddalena vs. Prates	May 2, 2026	1	3:29	Perth, Australia	
Loss	23–7–1	Benoît Saint Denis	KO (punches)	UFC 322	November 15, 2025	1	0:16	New York City, New York, United States	Catchweight (157.2 lb) bout. Dariush missed weight.
Win	23–6–1	Renato Moicano	Decision (unanimous)	UFC 317	June 28, 2025	3	5:00	Las Vegas, Nevada, United States	
Loss	22–6–1	Arman Tsarukyan	KO (knee and punches)	UFC on ESPN: Dariush vs. Tsarukyan	December 2, 2023	1	1:04	Austin, Texas, United States	
Loss	22–5–1	Charles Oliveira	TKO (punches)	UFC 289	June 10, 2023	1	4:10	Vancouver, British Columbia, Canada	
Win	22–4–1	Mateusz Gamrot	Decision (unanimous)	UFC 280	October 22, 2022	3	5:00	Abu Dhabi, United Arab Emirates	
Win	21–4–1	Tony Ferguson	Decision (unanimous)	UFC 262	May 15, 2021	3	5:00	Houston, Texas, United States	
Win	20–4–1	Carlos Diego Ferreira	Decision (split)	UFC Fight Night: Overeem vs. Volkov	February 6, 2021	3	5:00	Las Vegas, Nevada, United States	Fight of the Night.
Win	19–4–1	Scott Holtzman	KO (spinning back fist)	UFC Fight Night: Lewis vs. Oleinik	August 8, 2020	1	4:38	Las Vegas, Nevada, United States	Catchweight (158 lb) bout; Dariush missed weight.
Win	18–4–1	Drakkar Klose	KO (punch)	UFC 248	March 7, 2020	2	1:00	Las Vegas, Nevada, United States	Performance of the Night.
Win	17–4–1	Frank Camacho	Submission (rear-naked choke)	UFC Fight Night: Maia vs. Askren	October 26, 2019	1	2:02	Kallang, Singapore	Performance of the Night.
Win	16–4–1	Drew Dober	Submission (armbar)	UFC Fight Night: Lewis vs. dos Santos	March 9, 2019	2	4:41	Wichita, Kansas, United States	Performance of the Night.
Win	15–4–1	Thiago Moisés	Decision (unanimous)	UFC Fight Night: The Korean Zombie vs. Rodríguez	November 10, 2018	3	5:00	Denver, Colorado, United States	
Loss	14–4–1	Alexander Hernandez	KO (punch)	UFC 222	March 3, 2018	1	0:42	Las Vegas, Nevada, United States	
Draw	14–3–1	Evan Dunham	Draw (majority)	UFC 216	October 7, 2017	3	5:00	Las Vegas, Nevada, United States	
Loss	14–3	Edson Barboza	KO (knee)	UFC Fight Night: Belfort vs. Gastelum	March 11, 2017	2	3:35	Fortaleza, Brazil	
Win	14–2	Rashid Magomedov	Decision (unanimous)	The Ultimate Fighter Latin America 3 Finale: dos Anjos vs. Ferguson	November 5, 2016	3	5:00	Mexico City, Mexico	
Win	13–2	James Vick	KO (punches)	UFC 199	June 4, 2016	1	4:16	Inglewood, California, United States	
Loss	12–2	Michael Chiesa	Submission (rear-naked choke)	UFC on Fox: Teixeira vs. Evans	April 16, 2016	2	1:20	Tampa, Florida, United States	
Win	12–1	Michael Johnson	Decision (split)	UFC Fight Night: Teixeira vs. Saint Preux	August 8, 2015	3	5:00	Nashville, Tennessee, United States	
Win	11–1	Jim Miller	Decision (unanimous)	UFC on Fox: Machida vs. Rockhold	April 18, 2015	3	5:00	Newark, New Jersey, United States	
Win	10–1	Daron Cruickshank	Submission (rear-naked choke)	UFC 185	March 14, 2015	2	2:48	Dallas, Texas, United States	Catchweight (157 lb) bout; Cruickshank missed weight. Performance of the Night.
Win	9–1	Carlos Diego Ferreira	Decision (unanimous)	UFC 179	October 25, 2014	3	5:00	Rio de Janeiro, Brazil	
Win	8–1	Anthony Rocco Martin	Submission (arm-triangle choke)	UFC Fight Night: Henderson vs. dos Anjos	August 23, 2014	2	3:38	Tulsa, Oklahoma, United States	
Loss	7–1	Ramsey Nijem	TKO (punches)	UFC Fight Night: Nogueira vs. Nelson	April 11, 2014	1	4:20	Abu Dhabi, United Arab Emirates	
Win	7–0	Charlie Brenneman	Submission (rear-naked choke)	UFC Fight Night: Rockhold vs. Philippou	January 14, 2014	1	1:45	Duluth, Georgia, United States	
Win	6–0	Jason Meaders	KO (punch)	Respect in the Cage 20	May 4, 2013	2	4:03	Pomona, California, United States	Defended the RITC Lightweight Championship.
Win	5–0	Trace Gray	Submission (armbar)	Respect in the Cage 19	January 19, 2013	1	0:36	Pomona, California, United States	Won the RITC Lightweight Championship.
Win	4–0	Gilberto dos Santos	TKO (doctor stoppage)	High Fight Rock 2	October 27, 2012	1	4:03	Goiânia, Brazil	
Win	3–0	Dominic Gutierrez	Submission (rear-naked choke)	Samurai MMA Pro 2011	October 21, 2011	1	1:16	Culver City, California, United States	
Win	2–0	Vance Bejarano	Submission (rear-naked choke)	Respect in the Cage 8	October 8, 2010	1	N/A	Pomona, California, United States	
Win	1–0	Jordan Betts	Decision (split)	Respect in the Cage 2	November 20, 2009	3	5:00	Pomona, California, United States	

== Grappling record ==
1 Matches, 0 Wins, 1 Losses
Result	Rec.	Opponent	Method	Event	Division	Type	Date	Location
Loss	0–1	(Brazil) Kron Gracie	Referee Decision	ACBJJ World Trials	-77 kg	Gi	September 26, 2012	(United States) San Diego, CA

== See also ==
- List of current UFC fighters
- List of male mixed martial artists
