= Gavin Tucker =

Canadian mixed martial artist

- Born: Gavin Scott Tucker; June 17, 1986 (age 40); St. Anthony, Newfoundland and Labrador, Canada
- Nickname: Guv'Nor
- Height: 5 ft 7 in (1.70 m)
- Weight: 145 lb (66 kg; 10 st 5 lb)
- Division: Featherweight
- Reach: 66 in (168 cm)
- Fighting out of: Halifax, Nova Scotia, Canada
- Team: Titans MMA 2010–2021; Tower One 2021-
- Rank: Black belt in Brazilian Jiu-Jitsu under Renzo Gracie
- Years active: 2011–2026

Mixed martial arts record
- Total: 16
- Wins: 13
- By knockout: 4
- By submission: 6
- By decision: 3
- Losses: 3
- By knockout: 1
- By submission: 1
- By decision: 1

Other information
- Mixed martial arts record from Sherdog

Gavin Scott Tucker (born June 17, 1986) is a Canadian retired professional mixed martial artist. Tucker competed in the featherweight division for the Ultimate Fighting Championship (UFC). He had previously won the Extreme Cage Combat promotion championship in the featherweight category.

== Background ==
Tucker was born in St. Anthony, NL, and raised in Ship Cove, Newfoundland and Labrador, on June 17, 1986. He started practicing traditional martial arts like taekwondo and judo in his teens, before leaving for Nova Scotia to study. He graduated from St. Francis Xavier University after studying jazz, music industry and performance. After stationing permanently in Halifax, he got interested in martial arts and found a gym to train at. Tucker began competing in mixed martial arts in 2009. He competed on the regional scene, almost exclusively in the Maritimes of Canada.

== Mixed martial arts career ==
=== Early career ===
Tucker was the reigning Extreme Cage Combat Featherweight Champion when he was signed to the UFC in early 2017.

=== Ultimate Fighting Championship ===
Tucker made his promotional debut on February 19, 2017 against Sam Sicilia at UFC Fight Night 105. Tucker won the fight via unanimous decision.

Tucker faced Ricky Glenn on September 9, 2017 at UFC 215. Tucker suffered his first professional loss in this fight by unanimous decision. The referee was criticized by many observers, who felt that the fight should have been stopped earlier, as Tucker was clearly exhausted and had absorbed 142 significant strikes. UFC president Dana White tweeted, "This ref SUCKS" during the fight and tweeted after the fight, "Look at the poor kid's face!!! The ref needs his ass whooped!!!!" Other commentators blamed Tucker's corner for not throwing in the towel to stop the fight. Despite Tucker suffering 4 broken bones in his face as a result of the fight, he defended the referee's, Kyle Cardinal, decision on his Facebook.

In victory say little. In defeat ....less.

ill keep it short and sweet. i lost on Saturday. stop blaming the ref for a bad call. that man let me go out on my shield. he visited while i was in the hospital and apologized. was him and i in that cage. I didnt stop fighting. he saw that. he should sleep easy.

I have four broken bones in my face. the first which started on the jaw in rd 1 and the fight went down for me from there. i have 2 fractured orbital and another vertical fracture in the jaw according to the x ray/CT scan. the heartbreak of losing hurts much worse. throughout the day i wiped a lot [sic] of blood off my cheek and i can't say for sure there weren't some tears in there. I fought w blurred vision and 3 different Rick Glenns kicked the fuck out of me for the last two rds. (i tried to hit the one in the middle) congrats to my opponent. i hope you go far because i plan on seeing you again. I fought my heart out. I'm a rare breed of straight savage and i don't need social media to tell me that. however...i am appreciative of all the support i received on here. which is why I'm writing this. I have no excuses and won't stand for anyone making them for me. that's not how the north folk get it done.

Tucker was expected to face Andre Soukhamthath in a bantamweight bout on October 27, 2018 at UFC Fight Night 138. However, Tucker pulled out of the fight in early October, citing an undisclosed injury, and he was replaced by promotional newcomer Jonathan Martinez.

Tucker faced Seung Woo Choi on July 27, 2019 at UFC 240. He won the fight via a rear-naked choke in round three.

Tucker was scheduled to face Billy Quarantillo on April 25, 2020. However, on April 9, Dana White, the president of UFC announced that this event was postponed to a future date.

Tucker faced Justin Jaynes on August 8, 2020 at UFC Fight Night 174. Tucker won the fight via a rear-naked choke in round three. This win earned him the Performance of the Night award.

Tucker faced Billy Quarantillo on December 12, 2020 at UFC 256. He won the fight via unanimous decision.

Tucker was briefly linked to a bout against Cub Swanson on May 1, 2021 at UFC on ESPN 23. However, Tucker was tabbed as a short notice replacement to face Dan Ige on March 13, 2021 at UFC Fight Night: Edwards vs. Muhammad instead. He lost the fight via knockout in the first round.

Tucker was scheduled to face Pat Sabatini on November 20, 2021 at UFC Fight Night 198. However, Tucker had to pull out of the bout in late October, and the pair was rescheduled on April 9, 2022 at UFC 273. However, Tucker pulled out for unknown reasons.

Tucker faced Diego Lopes at UFC on ESPN: Sandhagen vs. Font on August 5, 2023. He lost the bout via an armbar submission in the first round.

Tucker was scheduled to face Jack Jenkins on August 17, 2024 at UFC 305. However, Tucker withdrew from the bout due to an injury and was replaced by Herbert Burns.

Tucker was scheduled to face Lee Jeong-yeong on May 10, 2025, at UFC 315. However, Tucker withdrew due to undisclosed reasons and was replaced by Daniel Santos.

Tucker was scheduled to face Choi Doo-ho on April 18, 2026 at UFC Fight Night 273. However, Tucker had not signed a bout agreement and subsequently announced his retirement from mixed martial arts as a result of numerous injuries.

== Championships and accomplishments ==
=== Mixed martial arts ===
- Ultimate Fighting Championship
  - Performance of the Night (One time) vs Justin Jaynes
- Extreme Combat Championship
  - ECC Featherweight Championship (One time)
    - One successful title defense

== Mixed martial arts record ==
Professional record breakdown
16 matches	13 wins	3 losses
By knockout	4	1
By submission	6	1
By decision	3	1

Res.	Record	Opponent	Method	Event	Date	Round	Time	Location	Notes
Loss	13–3	Diego Lopes	Submission (armbar)	UFC on ESPN: Sandhagen vs. Font	August 5, 2023	1	1:38	Nashville, Tennessee, United States	
Loss	13–2	Dan Ige	KO (punch)	UFC Fight Night: Edwards vs. Muhammad	March 13, 2021	1	0:22	Las Vegas, Nevada, United States	
Win	13–1	Billy Quarantillo	Decision (unanimous)	UFC 256	December 12, 2020	3	5:00	Las Vegas, Nevada, United States	
Win	12–1	Justin Jaynes	Submission (rear-naked choke)	UFC Fight Night: Lewis vs. Oleinik	August 8, 2020	3	1:43	Las Vegas, Nevada, United States	Performance of the Night.
Win	11–1	Choi Seung-woo	Submission (rear-naked choke)	UFC 240	July 27, 2019	3	3:17	Edmonton, Alberta, Canada	Tucker was deducted one point in round 2 due to an illegal knee.
Loss	10–1	Ricky Glenn	Decision (unanimous)	UFC 215	September 9, 2017	3	5:00	Edmonton, Alberta, Canada	
Win	10–0	Sam Sicilia	Decision (unanimous)	UFC Fight Night: Lewis vs. Browne	February 19, 2017	3	5:00	Halifax, Nova Scotia, Canada	
Win	9–0	Chris Coggins	KO (head kick)	Extreme Cage Combat 25	July 23, 2016	1	0:37	Halifax, Nova Scotia, Canada	Defended the ECC Featherweight Championship.
Win	8–0	David Harris	TKO (punches)	Extreme Cage Combat 22	March 14, 2015	2	2:02	Halifax, Nova Scotia, Canada	Won the vacant ECC Featherweight Championship.
Win	7–0	Lyndon Whitlock	Submission (rear-naked choke)	Extreme Cage Combat 15	February 16, 2013	3	3:09	Halifax, Nova Scotia, Canada	Catchweight (146.2 lb) bout; Tucker missed weight.
Win	6–0	Robert Rende	TKO (punches)	Extreme Cage Combat 14	April 27, 2012	3	2:27	Halifax, Nova Scotia, Canada	Return to Featherweight.
Win	5–0	Jeremy Henry	Submission (rear-naked choke)	Extreme Cage Combat 13	January 27, 2012	1	5:00	Halifax, Nova Scotia, Canada	Lightweight debut.
Win	4–0	Christopher Corporon	Submission (armbar)	Elite1 MMA Productions: Wild Card 2	October 15, 2011	1	1:35	Moncton, New Brunswick, Canada	
Win	3–0	David Spence	Submission (armbar)	East Coast Fight Productions: Resurgence	May 27, 2011	1	3:09	Trenton, Nova Scotia, Canada	
Win	2–0	Michael Waugh	TKO (punches)	Extreme Cage Combat 12	April 16, 2011	1	3:02	Halifax, Nova Scotia, Canada	
Win	1–0	Ryan Connor	Decision (unanimous)	Extreme Cage Combat 11	February 19, 2011	3	5:00	Halifax, Nova Scotia, Canada	Featherweight debut.

== See also ==
- List of Canadian UFC fighters
- List of male mixed martial artists
