= Nazim Sadykhov =

Azerbaijani mixed martial artist (born 1994)

- Born: May 16, 1994 (age 32); Moscow, Russia
- Other names: Black Wolf
- Height: 5 ft 10 in (1.78 m)
- Weight: 155 lb (70 kg; 11 st 1 lb)
- Division: Lightweight
- Reach: 69 in (175 cm)
- Fighting out of: Brooklyn, New York City, U.S.
- Years active: 2018–present

Mixed martial arts record
- Total: 15
- Wins: 11
- By knockout: 8
- By submission: 2
- By decision: 1
- Losses: 3
- By knockout: 2
- By submission: 1
- Draws: 1

Other information
- Mixed martial arts record from Sherdog

Nazim Sadykhov (Azerbaijani: Nazim Sadıxov, born May 16, 1994) is an Azerbaijani mixed martial artist who currently competes in the Lightweight division of the Ultimate Fighting Championship (UFC).

== Early life ==
Nazim Sadykhov was born on May 16, 1994, in Moscow, Russia, to Azerbaijani parents. His father introduced him to sports early to teach self-defense. Sadykhov grew up in Brooklyn, New York, but maintains a strong connection to his Azerbaijani heritage, honoring his lineage and cultural roots.

== Mixed martial arts career ==
=== Early career ===
Nazim Sadykhov began his professional mixed martial arts (MMA) career on November 16, 2018. After an initial loss, he achieved a series of victories, including six by knockout and two by submission. This performance led to his participation in Dana White's Contender Series on August 16, 2022, where he secured a third-round knockout against Ahmad Hassanzada, earning a contract with the Ultimate Fighting Championship (UFC).

=== Ultimate Fighting Championship ===
In his UFC debut, Sadykhov faced Evan Elder on February 18, 2023, at UFC Fight Night 219. He won the fight by technical knockout due to a doctor's stoppage in the third round. This fight earned his Fight of the Night award.

Sadykhov faced Terrance McKinney on July 15, 2023, at UFC on ESPN 49. He won the fight via a rear-naked choke in round two.

Sadykhov faced Viacheslav Borshchev on November 11, 2023, at UFC 295. The fight ended via a majority draw. This fight earned his Fight of the Night award.

Sadykhov was scheduled to face Chris Duncan on July 13, 2024, at UFC on ESPN 59. However, Duncan withdrew for unknown reasons and was replaced by MarQuel Mederos. A week later, Mederos pulled out, and the bout was scrapped.

Sadykhov faced Ismael Bonfim on February 15, 2025, at UFC Fight Night 251. He won the fight by technical knockout due to a doctor's stoppage at the end of the first round.

Sadykhov faced Nikolas Motta on June 21, 2025, at UFC on ABC 8. He won the fight by technical knockout in the second round. This fight earned him two $50,000 awards (Performance of the Night and Fight of the Night) totaling $100,000.

Sadykhov faced Farès Ziam on December 6, 2025 at UFC 323. He lost the fight by technical knockout via punches and elbows in the second round.

Sadykhov was scheduled to face MarQuel Mederos on April 11, 2026 at UFC 327. However, Sadykhov withdrew to an injury and was replaced by Chris Padilla.

Sadykhov faced Matheus Camilo on June 27, 2026, at UFC Fight Night 280. He lost the fight by technical knockout in the first round.

Sadykhov was scheduled to face Jefferson Nascimento on November 14, 2026 at UFC 334. However, Nascimento withdrew due to an injury, and Sadykhov subsequently withdrew due to a lingering injury of his own, resulting in the bout's cancellation.

== Championships and accomplishments ==
- Ultimate Fighting Championship
  - Fight of the Night (Three times) vs. Evan Elder, Viacheslav Borshchev and Nikolas Motta
  - Performance of the Night (One time) vs. Nikolas Motta
  - UFC Honors Awards
    - 2025: President's Choice Fight of the Year Nominee vs. Nikolas Motta
  - UFC.com Awards
    - 2025: Ranked #3 Fight of the Year vs. Nikolas Motta
- MMA Fighting
  - 2025 #4 Ranked Fight of the Year vs. Nikolas Motta

== Mixed martial arts record ==
Professional record breakdown
15 matches	11 wins	3 losses
By knockout	8	2
By submission	2	1
By decision	1	0
Draws	1	

Res.	Record	Opponent	Method	Event	Date	Round	Time	Location	Notes
Loss	11–3–1	Matheus Camilo	TKO (punches)	UFC Fight Night: Fiziev vs. Torres	June 27, 2026	1	1:31	Baku, Azerbaijan	
Loss	11–2–1	Farès Ziam	TKO (elbows and punches)	UFC 323	December 6, 2025	2	4:59	Las Vegas, Nevada, United States	
Win	11–1–1	Nikolas Motta	KO (punches)	UFC on ABC: Hill vs. Rountree Jr.	June 21, 2025	2	4:17	Baku, Azerbaijan	Performance of the Night. Fight of the Night.
Win	10–1–1	Ismael Bonfim	TKO (doctor stoppage)	UFC Fight Night: Cannonier vs. Rodrigues	February 15, 2025	1	5:00	Las Vegas, Nevada, United States	
Draw	9–1–1	Viacheslav Borshchev	Draw (majority)	UFC 295	November 11, 2023	3	5:00	New York City, New York, United States	Fight of the Night.
Win	9–1	Terrance McKinney	Submission (rear-naked choke)	UFC on ESPN: Holm vs. Bueno Silva	July 15, 2023	2	1:07	Las Vegas, Nevada, United States	
Win	8–1	Evan Elder	TKO (doctor stoppage)	UFC Fight Night: Andrade vs. Blanchfield	February 18, 2023	3	0:38	Las Vegas, Nevada, United States	Fight of the Night.
Win	7–1	Ahmad Sohail Hassanzada	KO (punch)	Dana White's Contender Series 50	August 16, 2022	3	1:59	Las Vegas, Nevada, United States	
Win	6–1	Joe Boerschig	KO (punches)	Fury FC 59	March 27, 2022	1	0:55	Houston, Texas, United States	
Win	5–1	Juan Carlos De Leon	TKO (punches)	Fury FC 55	December 19, 2021	3	4:38	Houston, Texas, United States	
Win	4–1	John Herrera	Submission (rear-naked choke)	Fury FC 52	October 17, 2021	3	4:38	Houston, Texas, United States	
Win	3–1	Elijah Harris	Decision (unanimous)	Cage Fury FC 81	February 1, 2020	3	5:00	Bensalem, Pennsylvania, United States	
Win	2–1	Trent Stump	TKO (punches)	Cage Fury FC 77	August 16, 2019	1	4:33	Atlantic City, New Jersey, United States	
Win	1–1	William Dill	KO (punch)	Ring of Combat 68	May 31, 2019	1	0:58	Atlantic City, New Jersey, United States	Lightweight debut.
Loss	0–1	Juan Galarza	Submission (rear-naked choke)	Ring of Combat 66	November 16, 2018	1	3:38	Atlantic City, New Jersey, United States	Catchweight (150 lb) bout.

== See also ==
- List of current UFC fighters
- List of Dana White's Contender Series alumni
- List of male mixed martial artists
