= Eric Nicksick =

American mixed martial arts coach

- Born: Eric Nicksick; September 23, 1979 (age 46); United States
- Team: Xtreme Couture Mixed Martial Arts

Other information
- Occupation: General manager and head coach of Xtreme Couture Mixed Martial Arts
- University: University of Nevada, Reno; Dixie State College
- Notable school: Green Valley High School

Eric Nicksick (born 23 September 1979) is an American mixed martial arts (MMA) coach and former college football player who is currently the general manager and head coach at Xtreme Couture. Three MMA fighters have become UFC champions under his guidance: Francis Ngannou (UFC Heavyweight Champion), Aljamain Sterling (UFC Bantamweight Champion) and Sean Strickland (UFC Middleweight Champion). He was also part of the team that helped Miesha Tate become the UFC Women's Bantamweight Champion.

== Early life ==
Eric Nicksick was born to a family of sport coaches and grew up in Henderson, Nevada. His father Jim Nicksick and uncle, Dave Castro were assistant coaches at Green Valley High School. Another uncle of his, Gary Wheeler, was a high school basketball coach in Southern Nevada. Most notably, Mike Nixon who was another uncle of Nicksick was a coach in the National Football League with his most prominent positions being head coach of the Washington Redskins and the Pittsburgh Steelers.

Nicksick attended Green Valley High School where he was an all-state wide receiver. He then attended the University of Nevada, Reno where he played for the Nevada Wolf Pack football team but was kicked off the team. He then transferred to Dixie State College where he played two years for the Dixie State Trailblazers football team before leaving after getting a series of concussions.

== Coaching career ==
After graduation, Nicksick worked as a bartender. In late 2006, Nicksick wanted to find a hobby that would keep him in shape compared to his college football days and ended up at Xtreme Couture. At the time, the gym wasn't opened up to the public but its owner, Randy Couture was using it to prepare for his UFC Heavyweight title fight against Tim Sylvia at UFC 68 which he eventually won. Nicksick trained with fighters like Couture, Mike Pyle, Jay Hieron and Martin Kampmann even though he had no intention of becoming a fighter or coach at the time. However Nicksick wanting to find a different direction in his life, kept returning to the gym to train and help set it up. When the gym finally opened to the public a few months later, Nicksick was the first official member of it. After seven years at the gym, Nicksick received his purple belt in Brazilian jiu-jitsu. Nicksick eventually worked his way to be general manager of Xtreme Colture and with the help of its head coach, Robert Follis, helped reverse its decline. Later on he would also become head coach after Follis left the gym in November 2017.

While he was not the coach in charge, Nicksick acted as Follis' second-in-command when they worked to prepare Miesha Tate for her title bout on March 5, 2016, against Holly Holm at UFC 196. Tate won in the fifth round by submission via rear naked choke becoming the UFC Women's Bantamweight Champion.

Nicksick's first notable success as a coach came on March 6, 2021, with Aljamin Sterling. Sterling trained with Nicksick for his title bout against Petr Yan at UFC 259. Nicksick along with Sterling's original coach, Ray Longo were in Sterling's corner during the fight. Sterling won the bout via disqualification to become UFC Bantamweight Champion which attracted controversy. When Matt Serra found out that Sterling asked Nicksick to be in his corner instead of him, he retired as a cornerman stating he felt betrayed by the decision. Nicksick continued to coach Sterling for his rematch against Yan at UFC 273 and his title defence against T.J. Dillashaw at UFC 280.

Nicksick's most notable success came when he trained Francis Ngannou to become UFC Heavyweight champion in 2021. After Ngannou lost his first title bout against Stipe Miocic at UFC 220, he left his original gym at MMA Factory in France to move to the United States to train under Nicksick at Xtreme Couture. Under Nicksick's training, Ngannou evolved his game to involve more wrestling and understanding of punch placement. On March 27, 2021, Ngannou won the rematch again Miocic at UFC 260 via knockout becoming the UFC Heavyweight champion. When Ngannou was set to defend his title against his former MMA Factory teammate, Ciryl Gane at UFC 270, Nicksick tried to convince Ngannou to pull out as he had injured his knee during training but Ngannou refused. At UFC 270, Nicksick was in Ngannou's corner giving significant pep talk and Ngannou successfully defended his title by defeating Gane via unanimous decision. Nicksick was also in Ngannou's corner in his bout against WBC heavyweight champion, Tyson Fury which Fury won via split decision.

Nicksick would repeat his success where he helped guide Sean Strickland to become UFC Middleweight Champion. Nicksick cornered Strickland in his title bout against Israel Adesanya at UFC 293 where Strickland won via unanimous decision. During the fight Nicksick told Strickland that he needed to keep the pressure and pace on Adesanya regardless of the signs they were winning. Nicksick later on stated they looked at footage of Adesanya's fights against Alex Pereira to come up with a strategy.

== Personal life ==
Nicksick is married to Annie Nicksick who works as a realtor. She helped Miesha Tate and her then-boyfriend Bryan Caraway complete their mortgage application on a new home to purchase in Las Vegas.

== Notable fighters trained ==
- Francis Ngannou
- Aljamain Sterling
- Sean Strickland
- Miesha Tate
- Cody Garbrandt
- Dan Ige
- Paul Felder
- Ray Sefo
- Brad Tavares
- Jared Gordon
- Chris Curtis
- Manel Kape

== Awards ==
- 2020 Coach of the Year, MMAJunkie.com

== See also ==
- Xtreme Couture Mixed Martial Arts
