= UFC on ESPN: Blaydes vs. Volkov =

UFC mixed martial arts event in 2020

- The poster for UFC on ESPN: Blaydes vs. Volkov
- Promotion: Ultimate Fighting Championship
- Date: June 20, 2020
- Venue: UFC Apex
- City: Enterprise, Nevada, United States
- Attendance: None (behind closed doors)

Event chronology
UFC on ESPN: Eye vs. Calvillo	UFC on ESPN: Blaydes vs. Volkov	UFC on ESPN: Poirier vs. Hooker

UFC on ESPN: Blaydes vs. Volkov (also known as UFC on ESPN 11 and UFC Vegas 3) was a mixed martial arts event produced by the Ultimate Fighting Championship that took place on June 20, 2020 at the UFC Apex facility in Enterprise, Nevada, part of the Las Vegas Metropolitan Area, United States.

== Background ==
The event was initially scheduled to take place at the SaskTel Centre in Saskatoon, Saskatchewan, Canada. Due to the COVID-19 pandemic, UFC president Dana White announced on April 9 that starting with UFC 249, all future events were indefinitely postponed. The event would have marked the promotion's second visit to Saskatoon, following UFC Fight Night: Holloway vs. Oliveira in August 2015. On May 21, the UFC announced the cancelation of the event in Canada.

A heavyweight bout between Curtis Blaydes and former Bellator Heavyweight Champion Alexander Volkov served as the event headliner.

A welterweight bout between former Bellator Welterweight Champion Lyman Good and Belal Muhammad was previously expected to take place at UFC 205 in November 2016, but Good was pulled from that event after being notified by the United States Anti-Doping Agency (USADA) due to a potential anti-doping violation stemming from an out-of-competition drug test. The matchup was once again booked for UFC 249 in April 2020, but Good pulled out due to testing positive for COVID-19, being the first fighter to publicly acknowledge the fact. They ultimately met at this event instead.

Joe Solecki was expected to face Austin Hubbard at the event. However, Solecki was removed from the pairing on June 13 for undisclosed reasons. He was replaced by promotional newcomer Max Rohskopf.

Matt Frevola was scheduled to face Frank Camacho at the event. However, Frevola was pulled from the fight during the week leading up to the event after teammate and cornerman, Billy Quarantillo, tested positive for COVID-19. Despite two negative tests, Frevola was removed from the bout in an abundance of caution. Promotional newcomer Justin Jaynes was tabbed as a replacement to face Camacho.

At the weigh-ins, Frank Camacho weighed in at 158 pounds, two pounds over the lightweight non-title fight limit. The bout proceeded at a catchweight and Camacho was fined 20% of his purse, which went to his opponent Justin Jaynes.

== Results ==
Main card (ESPN / ESPN+)
Weight class				Method	Round	Time	Notes
Heavyweight	Curtis Blaydes	def.	Alexander Volkov	Decision (unanimous) (49–46, 48–47, 48–46)	5	5:00
Featherweight	Josh Emmett	def.	Shane Burgos	Decision (unanimous) (29–28, 29–28, 29–27)	3	5:00
Women's Bantamweight	Raquel Pennington	def.	Marion Reneau	Decision (unanimous) (30–27, 29–28, 29–28)	3	5:00
Welterweight	Belal Muhammad	def.	Lyman Good	Decision (unanimous) (29–28, 29–28, 29–28)	3	5:00
Catchweight (160 lb)	Jim Miller	def.	Roosevelt Roberts	Submission (armbar)	1	2:25
Preliminary card (ESPN / ESPN+)
Lightweight	Bobby Green	def.	Clay Guida	Decision (unanimous) (29–28, 29–28, 30–27)	3	5:00
Women's Strawweight	Tecia Torres	def.	Brianna Van Buren	Decision (unanimous) (30–27, 30–27, 30–27)	3	5:00
Middleweight	Marc-André Barriault	vs.	Oskar Piechota	No Contest (overturned)	2	4:50	(Note: Originally a TKO (punches) win for Barriault; overturned after he tested positive for ostarine.)
Women's Flyweight	Gillian Robertson	def.	Cortney Casey	Submission (rear-naked choke)	3	4:32
Catchweight (158 lb)	Justin Jaynes	def.	Frank Camacho	TKO (punches)	1	0:41
Women's Flyweight	Lauren Murphy	def.	Roxanne Modafferi	Decision (unanimous) (30–27, 30–27, 29–28)	3	5:00
Lightweight	Austin Hubbard	def.	Max Rohskopf	TKO (retirement)	2	5:00

== Bonus awards ==
The following fighters received $50,000 bonuses.

- Fight of the Night: Josh Emmett vs. Shane Burgos
- Performance of the Night: Jim Miller and Justin Jaynes

== Reported payout ==
The following is the reported payout to the fighters as reported to the Nevada State Athletic Commission (NSAC). It does not include sponsor money and also does not include the UFC's traditional "fight night" bonuses. The total disclosed payout for the event was $1,655,000.

- Curtis Blaydes: $180,000 (includes $90,000 win bonus) def. Alexander Volkov: $80,000
- Josh Emmett: $152,000 (includes $76,000 win bonus) def. Shane Burgos: $75,000
- Raquel Pennington: $126,000 (includes $63,000 win bonus) def. Marion Reneau: $38,000
- Belal Muhammad: $100,000 (includes $50,000 win bonus) def. Lyman Good: $28,000
- Jim Miller: $208,000 (includes $104,000 win bonus) def. Roosevelt Roberts: $25,000
- Bobby Green: $72,000 (includes $36,000 win bonus) def. Clay Guida: $73,000
- Tecia Torres: $96,000 (includes $48,000 win bonus) def. Brianna Van Buren: $14,000
- Marc-André Barriault: $28,000 (includes $14,000 win bonus) def. Oskar Piechota: $20,000
- Gillian Robertson: $50,000 (includes $25,000 win bonus) def. Cortney Casey: $53,000
- Justin Jaynes: $29,000 (includes $12,000 win bonus) def. Frank Camacho: $20,000 ^
- Lauren Murphy: $76,000 (includes $38,000 win bonus) def. Roxanne Modafferi: $50,000
- Austin Hubbard: $50,000 (includes $25,000 win bonus) def. Max Rohskopf: $12,000

^ Camacho ($5,000) was fined 20% of his purse for failing to make the required weight limit for his fight. That money was issued to his opponent, a NSAC official confirmed.

== Aftermath ==
On August 5, it was announced that the NSAC issued a temporary suspension for Marc-André Barriault, after he tested positive for ostarine in his drug test associated with the event. The suspension would hold until a full disciplinary hearing at the next NSAC meeting, expected to take place in September. Four months later, Barriault was officially suspended for nine months retroactive to the date of the fight, with the result of the bout being overturned to a no contest due to the violation. He was fined $2,100 and before he is re-licensed in Las Vegas, Barriault will also have to pay a prosecution fee of $254.38.

== See also ==
- List of UFC events
- List of current UFC fighters
- 2020 in UFC
