= Justin Jaynes =

American mixed martial arts fighter

- Born: August 10, 1989 (age 37); Richmond, Michigan U.S.
- Other names: Guitar Hero
- Height: 5 ft 8 in (1.73 m)
- Weight: 145 lb (66 kg; 10 st 5 lb)
- Division: Featherweight
- Reach: 68 in (173 cm)
- Fighting out of: Las Vegas, Nevada, U.S.
- Team: Xtreme Couture Mixed Martial Arts (2009–present)
- Rank: Brown belt in Brazilian jiu-jitsu
- Years active: 2008–present

Mixed martial arts record
- Total: 29
- Wins: 18
- By knockout: 8
- By submission: 6
- By decision: 3
- By disqualification: 1
- Losses: 11
- By knockout: 4
- By submission: 1
- By decision: 6

Other information
- University: Olivet College
- Mixed martial arts record from Sherdog

Justin Jaynes (born August 10, 1989) is an American mixed martial artist who competes in the Featherweight and Lightweight divisions. A professional since 2008, he most notably competed in the Ultimate Fighting Championship (UFC). He is the former Warrior Xtreme Cagefighting (WXC) Lightweight champion.

== Background ==
Jaynes was born and grew up in Richmond, Michigan. Jaynes attended Richmond High School, graduating in 2007. In his senior year, Jaynes placed second at the 2007 Michigan High School state wrestling tournament, losing to Drakkar Klose in the finals. Jaynes then continued his wrestling career at Olivet College, from where he graduated with Bachelor's degree in Sport and Fitness Management.

== Mixed martial arts career ==
=== Early career ===
With mixed martial arts in its early phases in Michigan, Jaynes fought 47 amateur bouts around the state before turning pro in 2013.

Jaynes fought in various regional circuits and fought multiple times overseas. He also made one appearance in Bellator. Jaynes won the WXC Lightweight title and made one successful defense before leaving for the UFC.

=== Ultimate Fighting Championship ===
After a cornerman for Matt Frevola tested positive for COVID-19, Jaynes stepped in to fight Frank Camacho on three days notice. At the weigh-ins, Camacho weighed in at 158 pounds, 2 pounds over the allotted non-title lightweight limit of 156 pounds. The bout proceeded as a catchweight and Camacho was fined 20 percent of his purse which went to Jaynes. Jaynes won the fight via knockout in the first round. This win earned him the Performance of the Night award.

Jaynes faced Gavin Tucker at UFC Fight Night 174. He lost the fight via rear-naked choke in round three.

Jaynes was scheduled to face Gabriel Benítez on November 14, 2020, at UFC Fight Night: Felder vs. dos Anjos. The fight was canceled after Benítez tested positive for COVID-19. The pairing was left intact and eventually took place on December 5, 2020, at UFC on ESPN 19. He lost the fight via technical knockout in the first round.

Jaynes faced Devonte Smith on February 6, 2021, at UFC Fight Night: Overeem vs. Volkov. He lost the fight via technical knockout due to a doctor stoppage in round two.

Jayne faced Charles Rosa on June 26, 2021, at UFC Fight Night 190. Jaynes made waves across the internet as he announced before his fight that he was betting close to $25,000 on himself to win his fight. He lost the fight via split decision. Subsequently, he tested positive for marijuana and was suspended for four-and-a-half months by NSAC, making him eligible to return to competition on November 9, 2021.

In August 2021, Jaynes was released from the UFC.

=== Post UFC ===
In his first bout since his release from the UFC, Jaynes faced Carl Deaton III for the TWC Lightweight Championship at Total Warrior Combat: Unfinished Business on February 5, 2022. He lost the bout via unanimous decision.

== Personal life ==
Jaynes is a coach at Xtreme Couture Mixed Martial Arts in Las Vegas. He has a son.

== Championships and accomplishments ==
- Ultimate Fighting Championship
  - Performance of the Night (One time) vs. Frank Camacho
  - UFC.com Awards
    - 2020: Ranked #5 Upset of the Year vs. Frank Camacho
- Warrior Xtreme Cagefighting
  - 'Warrior Xtreme Cagefighting Lightweight Champion

== Mixed martial arts record ==
Professional record breakdown
29 matches	18 wins	11 losses
By knockout	8	4
By submission	6	1
By decision	3	6
By disqualification	1	0

Res.	Record	Opponent	Method	Event	Date	Round	Time	Location	Notes
Win	18–11	Marlon Gonzales	Decision (unanimous)	Tuff-N-Uff 149	October 25, 2025	3	5:00	Las Vegas, Nevada, United States	
Loss	17–11	Tsogookhuu Amarsanaa	TKO (elbows and punches)	Tuff-N-Uff 137	May 24, 2024	1	4:35	Las Vegas, Nevada, United States	Catchweight (165 lb) bout; Tsogookhuu missed weight.
Win	17–10	Carson Hardman	Submission (guillotine choke)	Fierce FC 30	February 10, 2024	1	2:35	West Valley City, Utah, United States	Catchweight (162 lb) bout.
Loss	16–10	Chris Padilla	TKO (punches)	Up Next Fighting 13	October 21, 2023	2	3:10	Commerce, California, United States	For the UNF Lightweight Championship.
Loss	16–9	Carl Deaton III	Decision (unanimous)	Total Warrior Combat: Unfinished Business	February 5, 2022	3	5:00	Lansing, Michigan, United States	Return to Lightweight. For the vacant TWC Lightweight Championship.
Loss	16–8	Charles Rosa	Decision (split)	UFC Fight Night: Gane vs. Volkov	June 26, 2021	3	5:00	Las Vegas, Nevada, United States	
Loss	16–7	Devonte Smith	TKO (doctor stoppage)	UFC Fight Night: Overeem vs. Volkov	February 6, 2021	2	3:38	Las Vegas, Nevada, United States	Catchweight (160 lb) bout.
Loss	16–6	Gabriel Benítez	TKO (knee to the body and elbows)	UFC on ESPN: Hermansson vs. Vettori	December 5, 2020	1	4:06	Las Vegas, Nevada, United States	Lightweight bout.
Loss	16–5	Gavin Tucker	Submission (rear-naked choke)	UFC Fight Night: Lewis vs. Oleinik	August 8, 2020	3	1:43	Las Vegas, Nevada, United States	Featherweight debut.
Win	16–4	Frank Camacho	TKO (punches)	UFC on ESPN: Blaydes vs. Volkov	June 20, 2020	1	0:41	Las Vegas, Nevada, United States	Catchweight (158 lb) bout; Camacho missed weight. Performance of the Night.
Win	15–4	James Warfield-Lane	TKO (punches)	WXC 78	May 29, 2019	1	2:05	Southgate, Michigan, United States	Catchweight (165 lb) bout.
Win	14–4	Brandon Noble	Submission (guillotine choke)	WXC 75	February 1, 2019	1	3:59	Southgate, Michigan, United States	Won the WXC Lightweight Championship.
Win	13–4	Deven Brown	Submission (guillotine choke)	WXC 72	June 15, 2018	1	1:31	Southgate, Michigan, United States	Catchweight (149 lb) bout.
Win	12–4	Abdul Sami Wali	DQ (fence grabbing)	Super Fight League 2018: U.P. Nawabs vs. Gujarat Warriors	February 24, 2018	1	4:21	Mumbai, India	Welterweight bout.
Loss	11–4	Tommy Aaron	Decision (unanimous)	Fight Club OC: Rumble on the Water 3	September 9, 2017	3	5:00	Long Beach, California, United States	
Win	11–3	Jacob Rosales	Submission (guillotine choke)	Fight Club OC: Thursday Night Fights 38	April 6, 2017	2	5:00	Costa Mesa, California, United States	
Win	10–3	Troy Lamson	Decision (unanimous)	Total Warrior Combat 29	May 14, 2016	5	5:00	Lansing, Michigan, United States	Return to Lightweight. Won the TWC Lightweight Championship.
Win	9–3	Chase Caldwell	TKO (doctor stoppage)	Xplode Fight Series: Payback	September 19, 2015	1	1:42	Valley Center, California, United States	
Win	8–3	Marcus Lamarr	TKO (punches)	Xplode Fight Series: Heat	July 11, 2015	1	0:52	Valley Center, California, United States	
Win	7–3	Erick Lozano	Decision (unanimous)	Big John's MMA: Salt City Showdown	May 16, 2015	3	5:00	Manistee, Michigan, United States	Welterweight debut.
Loss	6–3	Jesse Gross	Decision (split)	Provincial FC 3	October 18, 2014	3	5:00	London, Ontario, Canada	Catchweight (160 lb) bout.
Win	6–2	Ruben Baraiac	TKO (punches)	Bellator 124	September 12, 2014	1	4:17	Plymouth Township, Michigan, United States	
Loss	5–2	Jimmy Spicuzza	Decision (unanimous)	WSOF 10	June 21, 2014	3	5:00	Las Vegas, Nevada, United States	
Win	5–1	John Schultz	TKO (punches)	TWC Pro Series 23	April 26, 2014	1	4:54	Lansing, Michigan, United States	
Win	4–1	Andrew Hellner	Submission (rear-naked choke)	TXC Legends 2	October 19, 2013	2	2:48	Mt. Clemens, Michigan, United States	
Loss	3–1	Robby Ostovich	Decision (unanimous)	Destiny MMA: Proving Grounds 2	August 24, 2013	3	5:00	Honolulu, Hawaii, United States	
Win	3–0	Mickey Miller	Submission	Rage in the Cage 2	August 2, 2013	1	1:30	Paisley, Scotland	
Win	2–0	Justin Zeno	KO (punches)	TWC Pro Series 18	May 18, 2013	1	0:35	Lansing, Michigan, United States	
Win	1–0	Rick Ogden	Submission (rear-naked choke)	Big John's MMA: Rumble on the Border 2	March 15, 2013	1	1:09	Sault Ste. Marie, Michigan, United States	Lightweight debut.

== See also ==
- List of male mixed martial artists
