= Green Valley High School (Nevada) =

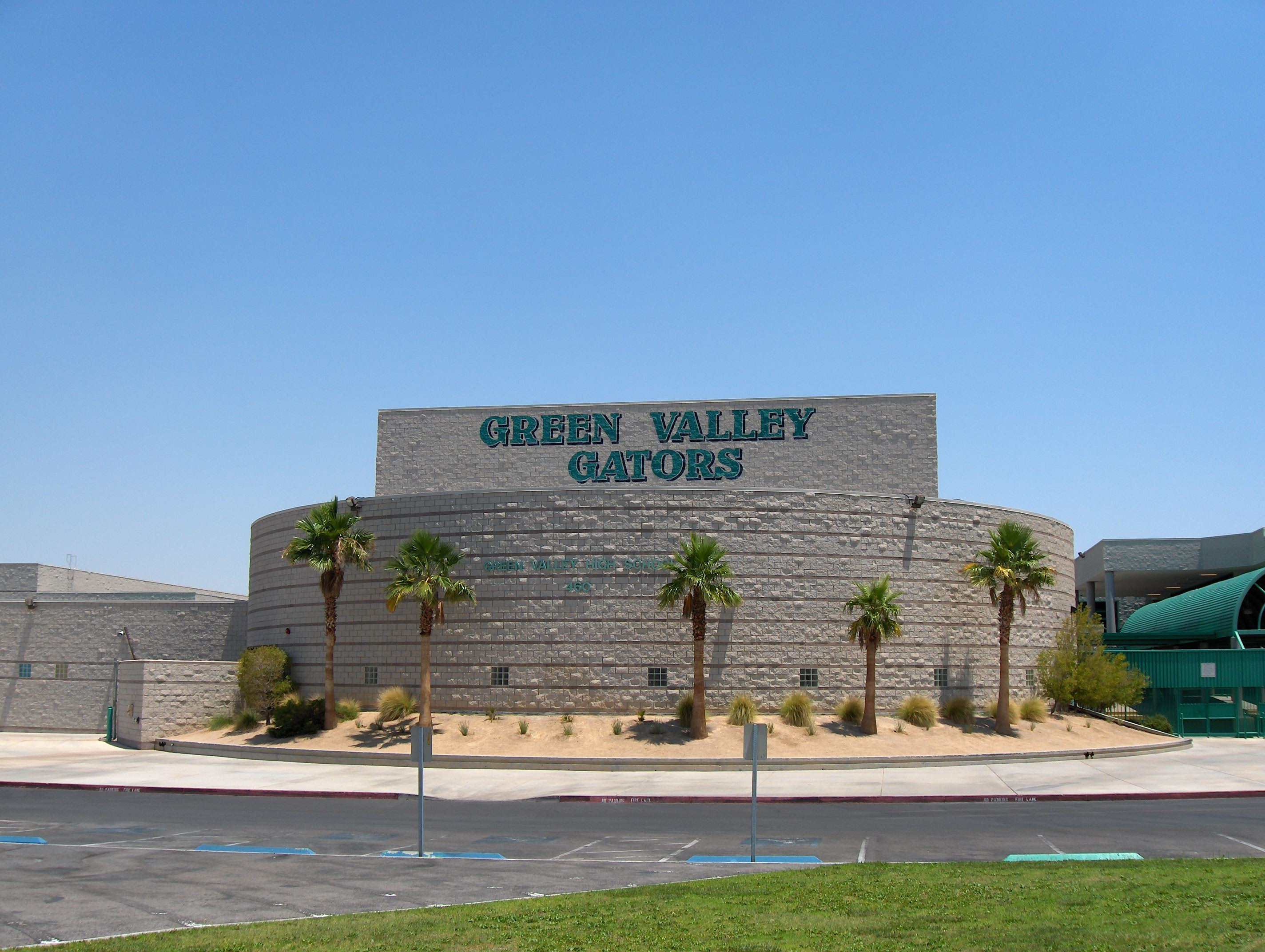

Location
- 460 North Arroyo Grande Boulevard; Henderson, Nevada 89014; United States; 36°03′28″N 115°03′11″W

Information
- Type: Comprehensive Public High School
- Motto: Commitment to Excellence
- Established: 1991; 35 years ago
- School district: Clark County School District
- CEEB code: 290084
- Principal: Kent Roberts
- Teaching staff: 109.00 (FTE)
- Grades: 9 to 12
- Gender: coed
- Enrollment: 2,640 (2023-2024)
- Student to teacher ratio: 24.22
- Campus type: Suburban
- Colors: Blue; Green
- Team name: Gators
- USNWR ranking: No. 3,504 (2021)
- Newspaper: The InvestiGator
- Website: www.greenvalleyhs.org
- Last updated: May 2017

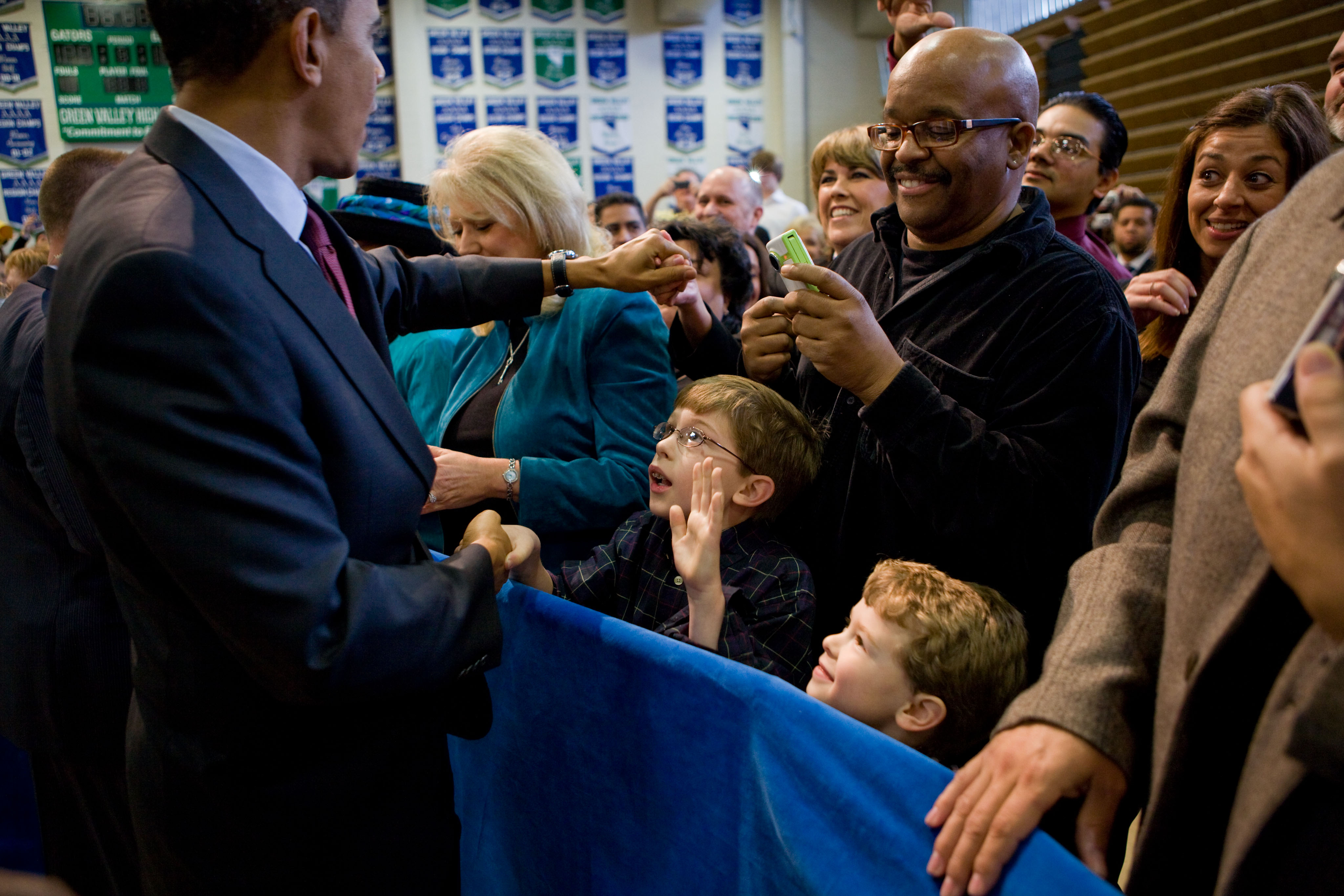
Obama at the school on February 19, 2010

Green Valley High School is located in Henderson, Nevada, United States. The school, serving grades 9 through 12, is a part of the Clark County School District (CCSD). The school's mascot are the Gators, and the school's motto is Commitment to Excellence.

== History ==
The school was named after the master-planned community of Green Valley which is located in northern Henderson. The school opened in the fall of 1991 with Carroll Johnston as the first principal and the first class graduating in 1993. Green Valley High School was the first high school since 1976 to open in Clark County School District.

Green Valley was the largest school in Nevada for three years. But as the number of schools in the district has increased to over forty schools, Green Valley's zoned area has decreased, greatly impacting the size of the school's population. While the school had 3,500 students in 1991, the school had 3,030 students in the 2020 school year.

In 2004, Vice President Dick Cheney addressed a re-election rally in the school's gymnasium. Former president Bill Clinton toured the school in January 2008 before the 2008 Nevada Democratic caucuses.

In 2008, Green Valley became the first high school in the CCSD to randomly test its students for drugs. This was because a student athlete was apprehended with black tar heroin.

In 2010, President Barack Obama held a Town Hall Meeting at Green Valley High School.

In 2014, former principal Jeff Horn moved to Assistant Chief Student Achievement Officer over GVHS and Kent Roberts became the new principal.

In 2019, the hit alternative band Imagine Dragons released the music video for their song "Bad Liar", which was filmed at the school.

== Extracurricular activities ==
The school's mascot is the Gator and the school's colors are green, blue, and silver.

=== Athletics ===
- The varsity baseball team won six straight state titles from 1993 to 1998, a seventh state title in 2001 and an eighth in 2003.
- The varsity girls' golf team, with 144 consecutive victories from 1992 to 2004, holds the high school level national record for most consecutive victories.
- Sports Illustrated has named Green Valley High School the best sports high school in Nevada for more than a decade.

==== Nevada Interscholastic Activities Association State Championships ====
- Baseball - 1993, 1994, 1995, 1996, 1997, 1998, 2001, 2003
- Bowling (Boys) - 1998, 1999, 2000, 2002, 2006
- Bowling (Girls) - 2001, 2002, 2003, 2022
- Cross Country (Girls) - 1999
- Flag Football (Girls) - 2019, 2020
- Golf (Boys) - 1993, 1994, 1997, 1999, 2005
- Golf (Girls) - 1997, 1998, 1999, 2000, 2003, 2009, 2010
- Soccer (Boys) - 1997, 1999
- Soccer (Girls) - 1995, 1998, 2011
- Swimming (Boys) - 1996
- Swimming (Girls) - 2018
- Tennis (Boys) - 1995, 1996, 1997, 1998, 1999
- Tennis (Girls) - 1996
- Track and Field (Boys) - 1995, 2003
- Volleyball (Boys) - 1997, 2000, 2016
- Volleyball (Girls) - 1993, 1995, 1996, 2001, 2011
- Wrestling (Boys) - 2012, 2013, 2014, 2015, 2016, 2017, 2020

=== Clubs and performing arts ===
==== Theatre ====
In 2006, Green Valley High School was one of six U.S. high schools to premiere High School Musical; in 2008 it was one of four U.S. high schools to present Disney High School Musical 2: On Stage. They were also asked to again premier another of Disney's musicals, Camp Rock: The Musical in the summer of 2010. In 2014, they premiered Disney and Cameron Mackintosh's Mary Poppins: The Musical, which ran from late January to early February. In May 2014, their production of Mary Poppins became the first high school play to show at the Las Vegas Smith Center. It was also selected to be one of the few high school shows chosen around the country to perform on the Lied Stage in June at the 2014 International Thespian Festival in Lincoln, Nebraska.

==== Forensics ====
The forensics team won sixteen straight Clark County School District titles and ten state titles beginning in 1995. The 2008 National Forensics Tournament was held at Green Valley High School.

==== Fine Arts ====
The fine arts department was awarded National Grammy Signature Status in 2002, 2005, and 2012. The Fine Arts Department includes Green Valley's programs for the choir, band, orchestra, theatre, and art.

==== Film ====
The film club, GatorReels, has made an online comedy show since 2008.

==== Varsity Quiz ====
Varsity Quiz team has won eight county championships since 1991, most recently in 2010.

==== Science Bowl ====
Science bowl team finished in the top ten at the regional DOE Science Bowl four times since 2000.

==== Music ====
In 2015, the Green Valley Marching Band traveled to Orlando, Florida to participate in the Parade Of Bands in Disney World.

In 2004, The Green Valley High Schools Symphonic band was the first band in the state of Nevada to participate in the Midwest Clinic in Chicago, Illinois. It performed at Carnegie Hall in April 2006 and November 2010. The band marched in the inauguration parades of Bill Clinton (1993) and Barack Obama (2009). Long-time director, Diane Koutsulis was recognized as Clark County School District Teacher of the Year in 1998.

The choral department has accompanied the Las Vegas Philharmonic Orchestra several times and been invited to the Heritage Festival and other programs across the nation. A select group of Green Valley High School's choir members were invited to sing with the Rolling Stones at their 50th anniversary tour at the MGM Grand Garden Arena in 2013 and 2017. Green Valley's Madrigals have also achieved first place in almost every choir festival they have competed in, including festivals in Vancouver and Hawaii.

The Green Valley High School Symphony performed at the Midwest Clinic in Chicago, Illinois in December 2008. The school's marching band was invited to march in the Macy's Thanksgiving Day Parade in 2010, and in the opening ceremonies parade for the 2011 Shanghai World Tourism Expo in Shanghai, China. They have been invited to a number of ceremonies such as the first Easter Parade in Edinburgh, Scotland (2003), New Years Day Parades in both London and Paris, and the Cabalgata de Reyes Parade in Madrid, Spain for the Christmas, “Twelfth Night" holiday. Green Valley's Madrigal Singers were invited among thousands of international applicants to perform at the American Choral Director's Association in both 2005 and 2009.

==== Dance ====
The GVHS dance department contains around 300 students, and supports two dance teams. The Gator Dance Co. is a 15 to 20 member team that performs at school events; The Gator Dance Elite is an 11 to 15 member team that participates in the same school events, and also performs at the CCSD Dance Festival, and travels to dance competitions. At the West Coast Elite Dance competition, the team won first in Varsity High School Medium Hip Hop in 2022; in 2020, they won first and second place in various competitions; and in 2019, they won several first place prizes.

==== Newspaper ====
The InvestiGator was named the best high school newspaper in Nevada in 2024 by the Las Vegas Review-Journal.

==== Student Council ====
The Green Valley High School Student Council has won the Silver Star Award many times.. The council has also been recognized as a National Gold Council of Excellence in 2008 and 2009.

== Academics ==
In 2010, Green Valley High School was ranked 859 in Newsweek Magazine's list of the nation's top 1,000 high schools in terms of college preparation. It also appeared on the list in the preceding four years.

Scott Panik won the 2007 Presidential Award for Excellence in Mathematics and Science Teaching.

Choir teacher Kimberly Barclay Ritzer became a semifinalist for the 2021 GRAMMY Music Educator Award.

=== Notable alumni ===
- Mace Coronel, TV actor
- Tyrell Crosby, National Football League player, Detroit Lions
- Brandyn Dombrowski, National Football League player, San Diego Chargers
- Connor Fields, 2016 Olympic BMX Gold Medalist
- Chad Hermansen, Major League Baseball player
- Chris Holm, basketball player
- Dave Krynzel, Major League Baseball player
- Eric Nicksick, UFC coach at Xtreme Couture Mixed Martial Arts
- Tana Mongeau, YouTuber and musician
- Nick Rattigan, drummer and singer of indie rock band Surf Curse

== Feeder schools ==
- Selma F. Bartlett Elementary School
- James I. Gibson Elementary School
- Lorna J. Kesterson Elementary School
- Nate Mack Elementary School
- Estes M. McDoniel Elementary School
- Jim Thorpe Elementary School
- Harriet Treem Elementary School
- Francis H. Cortney Junior High School
- Barbara & Hank Greenspun Junior High School
- Thurman White Middle School
