= UFC on ABC: Hill vs. Rountree Jr. =

Mixed martial arts event in 2025

- The poster for UFC on ABC: Hill vs. Rountree Jr.
- Promotion: Ultimate Fighting Championship
- Date: June 21, 2025
- Venue: Baku Crystal Hall
- City: Baku, Azerbaijan
- Attendance: 14,424
- Total gate: Not announced

Event chronology
UFC on ESPN: Usman vs. Buckley	UFC on ABC: Hill vs. Rountree Jr.	UFC 317: Topuria vs. Oliveira

UFC on ABC: Hill vs. Rountree Jr. (also known as UFC on ABC 8) was a mixed martial arts event produced by the Ultimate Fighting Championship that took place on June 21, 2025, at the Baku Crystal Hall in Baku, Azerbaijan.

== Background ==
The Baku Crystal Hall hosted the promotion's debut in Azerbaijan, which became the 31st country to hold a UFC event.

A light heavyweight bout between former UFC Light Heavyweight Champion Jamahal Hill and former title challenger Khalil Rountree Jr. headlined the event. The pairing was originally expected to meet at UFC 303 in June 2024, but the bout was scrapped as Rountree withdrew from the event after unintentionally ingesting DHEA in a tainted supplement. They were then booked to headline UFC on ESPN: Machado Garry vs. Prates in April, but Hill pulled out due to a lingering leg injury.

The co-main event was originally set to feature a flyweight bout between Tagir Ulanbekov and former UFC Flyweight Championship challenger Kyoji Horiguchi (who is also a former RIZIN Flyweight and two-time RIZIN Bantamweight Champion, as well as former Bellator Bantamweight World Champion). Horiguchi would make his promotional return for the first time since November 2016. In turn, Horiguchi pulled out for undisclosed reasons and was replaced by Azat Maksum.

A heavyweight bout between former interim UFC Heavyweight Championship challenger Curtis Blaydes and promotional newcomer Rizvan Kuniev took place at this event. The pairing was originally scheduled for UFC Fight Night: Cejudo vs. Song, then shifted to UFC 313 and eventually cancelled a few hours before the event after Blaydes had to pull out due to an undisclosed illness. The bout was later rescheduled for UFC Fight Night: Burns vs. Morales but was subsequently moved to this event for unknown reasons.

Another couple of fights were also scheduled for UFC Fight Night: Burns vs. Morales and moved to this event due to undisclosed reasons: a middleweight bout between Park Jun-yong and Ismail Naurdiev and a heavyweight bout between Hamdy Abdelwahab and The Ultimate Fighter: Team Peña vs. Team Nunes heavyweight winner Mohammed Usman.

Originally slated as a lightweight bout, the fight between newcomer Tofiq Musayev and Myktybek Orolbai proceeded at a catchweight of 165 pounds. Initially there was no indication of why and when the change was made, but both competitors exceeded the lightweight non-title fight limit during the weigh-ins, with Musayev weighing 163 pounds and Orolbai 165 pounds. It was revealed after the event that the change was related to Orolbai not being able to cut all the weight during fight week, therefore moving up the weight limit for the bout.

== Results ==
Main card (ABC / ESPN+)
Weight class				Method	Round	Time	Notes
Light Heavyweight	Khalil Rountree Jr.	def.	Jamahal Hill	Decision (unanimous) (49–46, 50–45, 50–45)	5	5:00
Lightweight	Rafael Fiziev	def.	Ignacio Bahamondes	Decision (unanimous) (30–27, 30–27, 30–27)	3	5:00
Heavyweight	Curtis Blaydes	def.	Rizvan Kuniev	Decision (split) (28–29, 29–28, 29–28)	3	5:00
Catchweight (165 lb)	Myktybek Orolbai	def.	Tofiq Musayev	Submission (kimura)	1	4:35
Lightweight	Nazim Sadykhov	def.	Nikolas Motta	TKO (punches)	2	4:17
Featherweight	Muhammad Naimov	def.	Bogdan Grad	Decision (unanimous) (29–28, 29–28, 29–28)	3	5:00
Preliminary card (ESPN / ESPN+)
Welterweight	Ko Seok-hyeon	def.	Oban Elliott	Decision (unanimous) (30–27, 30–27, 30–27)	3	5:00
Middleweight	Park Jun-yong	def.	Ismail Naurdiev	Decision (unanimous) (29–26, 29–26, 29–25)	3	5:00	(Note: Naurdiev was deducted two points in round 2 due to an illegal knee.)
Women's Bantamweight	Daria Zheleznyakova	def.	Melissa Mullins	Decision (unanimous) (29–28, 30–27, 30–27)	3	5:00
Women's Bantamweight	Klaudia Syguła	def.	Irina Alekseeva	Decision (unanimous) (30–27, 30–27, 30–27)	3	5:00
Flyweight	Tagir Ulanbekov	def.	Azat Maksum	Decision (unanimous) (29–28, 30–27, 30–27)	3	5:00
Heavyweight	Mohammed Usman	def.	Hamdy Abdelwahab	Decision (unanimous) (29–28, 29–28, 29–28)	3	5:00

== Bonus awards ==
The following fighters received two $50,000 bonuses totaling $100,000.

- Fight of the Night: Nazim Sadykhov vs. Nikolas Motta
- Performance of the Night: Nazim Sadykhov and Nikolas Motta

== See also ==
- 2025 in UFC
- List of current UFC fighters
- List of UFC events
