= Xtreme Couture Mixed Martial Arts =

Mixed martial arts training organization in Las Vegas

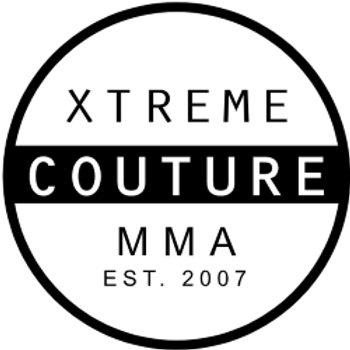
- Est.: 2007; 19 years ago
- Founded by: Randy Couture
- Primary trainers: Randy Couture; Ray Sefo; Eric Nicksick (Head Coach); Dennis Davis (Team Coach)
- Website: www.xcmma.com

Xtreme Couture Mixed Martial Arts is an American mixed martial arts training organization headed by former UFC Champion and former co-founder of Team Quest, Randy Couture. Xtreme Couture was founded with the flagship gym in Las Vegas. Since then, the franchise has spread to other cities in the United States and Canada. Xtreme Couture Las Vegas is one of the largest gyms (over 24,000 square feet (2,200 m^{2})) and most recognized brands and MMA gyms in the world, where many past and current top MMA fighters train.

== Instructors ==
The Las Vegas location features several MMA Instructors, including: Ray Sefo (Striking), Neil Melanson (Grappling *catch/sambo/BJJ), Dennis Davis (MMA/Grappling), Tim Lane (Striking/Conditioning), Kui Gonsalves-Kanoho (MMA/Striking), Patrick Begin (Grappling), & Kyle Griffin (Wrestling). Previous coaches included Gil Martinez, Brian Keck and Ron Frazier.

Xtreme Couture's long-time head coach Robert Follis died in December 2017.

== Notable fighters ==
Several fighters are affiliated with Xtreme Couture, these include:

- Magomed Ankalaev - Former UFC Light Heavyweight Champion
- Sean Strickland - Current UFC Middleweight Champion
- Francis Ngannou - Former PFL Heavyweight Champion; Former UFC Heavyweight Champion
- Jiri Prochazka - Former UFC Light Heavyweight Champion
- Miesha Tate - Former Women's Bantamweight Champion (Strikeforce, UFC)
- Randy Couture - (UFC, RINGS)
- Edmen Shahbazyan - (UFC)
- Amir Sadollah - (winner of The Ultimate Fighter 7, UFC)
- Evan Dunham (UFC)
- Frank Trigg - (PRIDE Fighting Championships, World Victory Road, Rumble on the Rock, UFC, BAMMA)
- Forrest Griffin - (KOTC, The Ultimate Fighter 1, UFC)
- Vitor Belfort - (UFC)
- Heath Herring - (PRIDE Fighting Championships, UFC)
- Jay Hieron - (IFL, UFC, Strikeforce, Affliction Entertainment, Bellator)
- John Alessio - (UFC, KOTC, PRIDE FC, WEC, Dream, MFC)
- John Gunderson (UFC)
- Martin Kampmann - (UFC)
- Mike Pyle (fighter) - (IFL, Elite Xtreme Combat, World Victory Road, Affliction Entertainment, UFC)
- Ray Sefo - (K-1, Strikeforce)
- Ryan Couture - (UFC, Strikeforce)
- Vinny Magalhaes (The Ultimate Fighter 8, M-1 Global, UFC)
- Kevin Lee (fighter) - (UFC, The Ultimate Fighter: Team Edgar vs. Team Penn)
- Tim Elliott – (UFC, The Ultimate Fighter: Tournament of Champions)
- Daniel Zellhuber - (UFC)
- Justin Jaynes - (UFC)
- Marvin Vettori - (UFC)
- Amir Albazi - (UFC)
- Javid Basharat - (UFC)
- Farid Basharat - (UFC)
- Chris Curtis - (UFC)

== Awards ==
- MMAjunkie.com
  - 2020 Coach of the Year (Eric Nicksick; tied with Tyson Chartier)
  - 2021 Gym of the Year

== See also ==
- List of professional MMA training camps
