= 2010 in Jungle Fight =

Information
- First date: February 27, 2010
- Last date: December 18, 2010

Events
- Total events: 8

Fights
- Total fights: 56

Chronology
2009 in Jungle Fight	2010 in Jungle Fight	2011 in Jungle Fight

The year 2010 is the eighth year in the history of Jungle Fight, a mixed martial arts promotion based in Brazil. In 2010 Jungle Fight held 8 events beginning with, Jungle Fight 17: Vila Velha.

== Events list ==
#	Event Title	Date	Arena	Location
24	Jungle Fight 24	December 18, 2010	Flamengo Rowing Club Gymnasium	Rio de Janeiro, Brazil
23	Jungle Fight 23	October 30, 2010	Pará State University Gymnasium	Belém, Brazil
22	Jungle Fight 22	September 18, 2010	Ibirapuera Gymnasium	São Paulo, Brazil
21	Jungle Fight 21	July 31, 2010	Nélio Dias Gymnasium	Natal, Brazil
20	Jungle Fight 20	May 22, 2010	Pacaembu Gymnasium	São Paulo, Brazil
19	Jungle Fight 19: Warriors 3	April 17, 2010	Mané Garrincha Stadium	São Paulo, Brazil
18	Jungle Fight 18: São Paulo	March 20, 2010	Pacaembu Gymnasium	São Paulo, Brazil
17	Jungle Fight 17: Vila Velha	February 27, 2010	Costa Beach	Vila Velha, Brazil

== Jungle Fight 17: Vila Velha ==
Jungle Fight 17: Vila Velha was an event held on February 27, 2010 at Costa Beach in Vila Velha, Brazil.

=== Results ===
Main Card
Weight class				Method	Round	Time	Notes
	Edson Franca	def.	Geronimo Dos Santos	TKO (Abdominal Injury)	2	3:37
	Rodrigo Damm	def.	Ivan Iberico	Decision (Unanimous)	3	5:00
	Erick Silva	vs.	Henrique Gomes de Oliveira	NC (Illegal Knee to a Downed Opponent)	2	3:57
	Carina Damm	def.	Aline Serio	TKO (Punches)	1	3:42
	Jorge Rodrigues Silva	def.	Roy Pariente	Submission (Anaconda Choke)	2	4:51
	Renan Barão	def.	Sérgio Silva Rodrigues	Decision (Unanimous)	3	5:00
	Marcelo Guimaraes	def.	Gilmar de Andrade	Decision (Unanimous)	3	5:00

== Jungle Fight 18: São Paulo ==
Jungle Fight 18: São Paulo was an event held on March 20, 2010 at The Pacaembu Gymnasium in São Paulo, Brazil.

=== Results ===
Main Card
Weight class				Method	Round	Time	Notes
	Sérgio Moraes	def.	Manuelo Morales	Submission (Kimura)	1	1:43
	Edilberto de Oliveira	def.	Pedro Irie	Submission (Guillotine Choke)	1	3:23
	Claudio Cunha Godoy	def.	Fernando Roca Duany	TKO (Knee to the Body)	1	0:47
	Pedro Munhoz	def.	Pablo Alfonso	Decision (Unanimous)	3	5:00
	Renato Moicano	def.	Marcos Alexandre Campos de Almeida	Submission (Rear-Naked Choke)	3	1:56
	Erik Becker	def.	Douglas Bertazini	Submission (Rear-Naked Choke)	3	0:56
	Gil de Freitas	def.	Romario Manoel da Silva	Submission (Armbar)	2	3:03

== Jungle Fight 19: Warriors 3 ==
Jungle Fight 19: Warriors 3 was an event held on April 17, 2010 at The Mané Garrincha Stadium in São Paulo, Brazil.

=== Results ===
Main Card
Weight class				Method	Round	Time	Notes
	Thiago De Oliveira Perpetuo	vs.	Luis Matoso	Draw	3	5:00
	Alessandro Ferreira	def.	Marcos Pereira	Submission (Kimura)	1	3:39
	Ubiratan Marinho Lima	def.	Bazilio Gradinar Brito Jr.	TKO (Punches)	2	4:37
	Iuri Alcântara	def.	Viscardi Andrade	Decision (Split)	3	5:00
	Reginaldo Vieira	def.	Fabio Bispo	Decision (Split)	3	5:00
	Vinicius Zani	def.	Guilherme Gomes	TKO (Punches)	2	1:00

== Jungle Fight 20 ==
Jungle Fight 20 was an event held on May 22, 2010 at The Pacaembu Gymnasium in São Paulo, Brazil.

=== Results ===
Main Card
Weight class				Method	Round	Time	Notes
	Gil De Freitas	def.	Edilberto De Oliveira	Decision (Unanimous)	3	5:00
	Nino Marroquin	def.	Francisco Jose Vinuelas	Decision (Unanimous)	3	5:00
	Francisco Trinaldo	def.	Flavio Alvaro	TKO (Punches)	2	4:01
	Fernando Martinez	def.	Jonathan Ortega	Decision (Unanimous)	3	5:00
	Fabio Bispo	vs.	Fernando Rodriguez	Draw	3	5:00
	Marcelo Guimaraes	def.	Ivan Galaz	Submission (Rear-Naked Choke)	1	1:35
	Thiago de Oliveira Perpetuo	def.	Luis Matoso	TKO (Punches)	3	2:12

== Jungle Fight 21 ==
Jungle Fight 21 was an event held on July 31, 2010 at The Nélio Dias Gymnasium in Natal, Brazil.

=== Results ===
Main Card
Weight class				Method	Round	Time	Notes
	Erick Silva	def.	Jose De Ribamar Machado Gomes	TKO (Knee and Punches)	2	3:39
	Francisco Ayon	def.	Eduardo Sandoval	KO (Punch)	1	0:54
	Iuri Alcântara	def.	Armando Gomes da Silva	TKO (Punches)	1	4:01
	Manuelo Morales	def.	Ramon Diaz	Decision (Unanimous)	4	5:00
	Dinarte Silva	def.	Eduardo Telles	Decision (Unanimous)	3	5:00
	Renato Moicano	def.	Joao Paulo Rodrigues de Souza	Decision (Unanimous)	3	5:00
	Edilberto de Oliveira	def.	Rondinelli Rodrigues Gomes	KO (Punch)	1	2:30
	Anderson Barbosa Salustino	def.	Guilherme Matos Rodrigues	Decision (Unanimous)	3	5:00

== Jungle Fight 22 ==
Jungle Fight 22 was an event held on September 18, 2010 at The Ibirapuera Gymnasium in São Paulo, Brazil.

=== Results ===
Main Card
Weight class				Method	Round	Time	Notes
	Iuri Alcântara	def.	Manuelo Morales	TKO (Front Kick to the Body)	1	0:16
	Eduardo Pamplona	def.	Edilberto de Oliveira	Decision (Unanimous)	3	5:00
	Augusto Montano	def.	Edvaldo de Oliveira	Submission (Guillotine Choke)	2	0:41
	Johil de Oliveira	vs.	Alessandro Ferreira	NC (Illegal Spike)	1	0:32
	Iuri Alcântara	def.	Francisco Trinaldo	Submission (Armbar)	2	2:24
	Manuelo Morales	def.	Rodolfo Rubio Perez	Decision (Unanimous)	3	5:00
	Marcelo Guimaraes	def.	Erik Becker	TKO (Punches)	2	4:12

== Jungle Fight 23 ==
Jungle Fight 23 was an event held on October 30, 2010 at The Pará State University Gymnasium in Belém, Brazil.

=== Results ===
Main Card
Weight class				Method	Round	Time	Notes
	Erick Silva	def.	Francisco Ayon	Submission (Arm-Triangle Choke)	1	1:07
	Edilberto de Oliveira	def.	Andre Luis Leal Lobato	Submission (Anaconda Choke)	2	2:49
	Ildemar Alcântara	def.	Jacob Quintana	KO (Knee to the Body)	1	1:23
	Francisco Ayon	def.	Fernando Martinez	Decision (Split)	3	5:00
	Erick Silva	def.	Gil de Freitas	Submission (Guillotine Choke)	3	0:57
	Neilson Gomes	def.	Silmar Nunes	Decision (Unanimous)	3	5:00
	Paulo Henrique Garcia Rodrigues	def.	Handerson Martins	Submission (Armbar)	2	1:54

== Jungle Fight 24 ==
Jungle Fight 24 was an event held on December 18, 2010 at The Flamengo Rowing Club Gymnasium in Rio de Janeiro, Brazil.

=== Results ===
Main Card
Weight class				Method	Round	Time	Notes
	Edilberto De Oliveira	vs.	Luis Sérgio Melo Jr.	Draw	3	5:00
	Renato Moicano	def.	Eduardo Felipe	Submission (Rear-Naked Choke)	2	2:49
	Gilberto Galvao	def.	Dimitry Burgo	Submission (Kimura)	1	3:02
	Ildemar Alcântara	def.	Jackson Mora	TKO (Punches)	1	4:37
	Francisco Trinaldo	def.	Bruno Leandro Soares Lobato	Submission (Anaconda Choke)	1	2:24
	Nelson Martins	def.	Bruno Cappelozza	DQ (Illegal Rabbit Punches)	1	1:58
	Wendell de Oliveira Marques	def.	Tadeu Mendonca	TKO (Punches)	1	3:05

== See also ==
- Jungle Fight
