= Marcelo Guimarães =

Brazilian mixed martial arts fighter

- Born: June 25, 1983 (age 43); Itapemirim, Espírito Santo, Brazil
- Other names: Magrão
- Height: 6 ft 0 in (1.83 m)
- Weight: 171 lb (78 kg; 12.2 st)
- Division: Welterweight; Middleweight
- Reach: 73 in (185 cm)
- Style: Wrestling, Brazilian Jiu-Jitsu
- Stance: Southpaw
- Fighting out of: Vila Velha, Brazil
- Team: X-Gym
- Rank: Black belt in Brazilian Jiu-Jitsu
- Years active: 2006-present

Mixed martial arts record
- Total: 12
- Wins: 9
- By knockout: 1
- By submission: 2
- By decision: 6
- Losses: 2
- By knockout: 2
- Draws: 1

Other information
- Mixed martial arts record from Sherdog

Marcelo Zilio Guimarães (born June 25, 1983) is a Brazilian mixed martial artist who competes in the welterweight division of the UFC.

== Mixed martial arts career ==
=== Ultimate Fighting Championship ===
In his UFC debut, Guimarães faced Dan Stittgen on July 11, 2012, at UFC on Fuel TV 4. He won the fight via split decision.

Guimarães next fight was expected to take place on November 10, 2012, on UFC on Fuel TV: Le vs. Franklin against South Korean newcomer, Hyun Gyu Lim. However, he was forced out of the bout with an injury and replaced by David Mitchell.

Guimarães/Lim was rescheduled for March 3, 2013, at UFC on Fuel TV 8. Guimarães lost via second round KO when he was caught flush with a knee.

Guimarães was scheduled to face Keith Wisniewski on September 4, 2013, at UFC Fight Night 28. However, Guimarães pulled out of the bout citing an injury and was replaced by Ivan Jorge.

Guimarães faced Andy Enz in a middleweight bout on June 28, 2014, at UFC Fight Night: Swanson vs. Stephens. He won the fight via split decision.

Guimarães faced Vitor Miranda on March 5, 2016, at UFC 196. He lost the fight via TKO in the second round.

== Championships and accomplishments ==
- Jungle Fight
  - Jungle Fight Middleweight Championship (One time)

== Mixed martial arts record ==
Professional record breakdown
12 matches	9 wins	2 losses
By knockout	1	2
By submission	2	0
By decision	6	0
Draws	1	

Res.	Record	Opponent	Method	Event	Date	Round	Time	Location	Notes
Loss	9–2–1	Vitor Miranda	TKO (head kick and punches)	UFC 196	March 5, 2016	2	1:09	Las Vegas, Nevada, United States	
Win	9–1–1	Andy Enz	Decision (split)	UFC Fight Night: Swanson vs. Stephens	June 28, 2014	3	5:00	San Antonio, Texas, United States	Return to Middleweight.
Loss	8–1–1	Hyun Gyu Lim	KO (knee and punches)	UFC on Fuel TV: Silva vs. Stann	March 3, 2013	2	4:00	Saitama, Japan	
Win	8–0–1	Dan Stittgen	Decision (split)	UFC on Fuel TV: Munoz vs. Weidman	July 11, 2012	3	5:00	San Jose, California, United States	Welterweight debut.
Win	7–0–1	Lucas Rota	Technical Submission (rear-naked choke)	Jungle Fight 31	August 20, 2011	2	3:07	Itu, Brazil	Won the Jungle Fight Middleweight Championship.
Win	6–0–1	Ildemar Alcântara	Decision (unanimous)	Jungle Fight 28	May 21, 2011	3	5:00	Rio de Janeiro, Brazil	
Win	5–0–1	Paulo Rodrigues	Decision (unanimous)	Jungle Fight 25	February 19, 2011	3	5:00	Vila Velha, Brazil	
Win	4–0–1	Erik Becker	TKO (punches)	Jungle Fight 22	September 18, 2010	2	4:12	São Paulo, Brazil	
Win	3–0–1	Ivan Galaz	Submission (rear-naked choke)	Jungle Fight 20	May 22, 2010	1	1:35	São Paulo, Brazil	
Win	2–0–1	Gilmar de Andrade	Decision (unanimous)	Jungle Fight 17: Vila Velha	February 27, 2010	3	5:00	Vila Velha, Brazil	
Draw	1–0–1	Gilmar de Andrade	Draw	Vila Velha Fight Combat	January 10, 2010	3	5:00	Vila Velha, Brazil	
Win	1–0	Willians Santos	Decision (split)	MMA: Kombat Espirito Santo	November 25, 2006	3	5:00	Vila Velha, Brazil	

== See also ==
- List of male mixed martial artists
