= 2009 in Jungle Fight =

Information
- First date: March 21, 2009
- Last date: October 17, 2009

Events
- Total events: 5

Fights
- Total fights: 37

Chronology
2008 in Jungle Fight	2009 in Jungle Fight	2010 in Jungle Fight

The year 2009 is the seventh year in the history of Jungle Fight, a mixed martial arts promotion based in Brazil. In 2009 Jungle Fight held 5 events beginning with, Jungle Fight 12: Warriors 2.

== Events list ==
#	Event Title	Date	Arena	Location
16	Jungle Fight 16	October 17, 2009	Maracanãzinho Gymnasium	Rio de Janeiro, Brazil
15	Jungle Fight 15	September 19, 2009	Pacaembu Gymnasium	São Paulo, Brazil
14	Jungle Fight 14: Ceará	May 9, 2009	Paulo Sarasate Gymnasium	Fortaleza, Brazil
13	Jungle Fight 13: Qualifying Fortaleza	March 28, 2009	Fighter Sport Academy	Fortaleza, Brazil
12	Jungle Fight 12: Warriors 2	March 21, 2009	Team Nogueira Training Center	Rio de Janeiro, Brazil

== Jungle Fight 12: Warriors 2 ==
Jungle Fight 12: Warriors 2 was an event held on March 21, 2009 at The Team Nogueira Training Center in Rio de Janeiro, Brazil.

=== Results ===
Main Card
Weight class				Method	Round	Time	Notes
	Eduardo Felipe	def.	Alvino Jose Torres	Submission (Rear-Naked Choke)	2	3:07
	Alexandre Pimentel	def.	Julio Vida Loca	Submission (Triangle Choke)	1	1:43
	Charles Oliveira	def.	Carlos Soares	Submission (Triangle Armbar)	1	2:48
	Monte Massey	def.	Clei da Silva	DQ	1	0:00
	Alex Nacfur	def.	Ronald Martins	Submission (Rear-Naked Choke)	1	2:55
	Rodrigo Ribeiro	def.	Mario Fumagalli	Decision (Unanimous)	3	5:00
	Andre Tadeu	def.	Robson Relma	Decision (Unanimous)	3	5:00

== Jungle Fight 13: Qualifying Fortaleza ==
Jungle Fight 13: Qualifying Fortaleza was an event held on March 28, 2009 at The Fighter Sport Academy in Fortaleza, Brazil.

=== Results ===
Main Card
Weight class				Method	Round	Time	Notes
	Romario Manoel Da Silva	def.	Anderson Melo	TKO (Punches)	1	4:24
	Joao Luiz Nogueira	def.	Geovani Silva	TKO (Punches)	1	3:55
	Anistavio Medeiros de Figueiredo	def.	Diego Tubarao	Submission (Heel Hook)	1	0:00
	Jamil Silveira da Conceicao	def.	Rodrigo Jacome	Submission (Anaconda Choke)	2	0:00
	Arymarcel Santos	def.	Yuri Fraga	Decision (Unanimous)	3	5:00
	Renee Forte	def.	Ramon Dias	Decision (Unanimous)	3	5:00
	Jose Maria Tome	def.	Gilson Nunes	Decision (Unanimous)	3	5:00

== Jungle Fight 14: Ceará ==
Jungle Fight 14: Ceará was an event held on May 9, 2009 at The Paulo Sarasate Gymnasium in Fortaleza, Brazil.

=== Results ===
Main Card
Weight class				Method	Round	Time	Notes
	Antônio Rogério Nogueira	def.	Dion Staring	Submission (Triangle Choke)	3	3:59
	Pedro Santos	def.	Romario Manoel da Silva	Submission (Brabo Choke)	1	4:56
	Ivan Iberico	def.	Jamil Silveira da Conceicao	Submission (Anaconda Choke)	2	2:45
	Ednaldo Oliveira	def.	Artur Tubarao	TKO (Punches)	1	3:46
	Alexandre Pimentel	def.	Joao Luiz Nogueira	Decision (Unanimous)	3	5:00
	Alex Nacfur	def.	Anistavio Medeiros de Figueiredo	TKO (Punches)	2	2:18
	Erick Silva	def.	Carlos Villamor	Submission (Kneebar)	2	3:38
	Arymarcel Santos	def.	Marcos Motta	Submission (Armbar)	1	1:28
	Johil de Oliveira	def.	Rodrigo Jacome	Submission (Kimura)	1	3:04

== Jungle Fight 15 ==
Jungle Fight 15 was an event held on September 19, 2009 at The Pacaembu Gymnasium in São Paulo, Brazil.

=== Results ===
Main Card
Weight class				Method	Round	Time	Notes
	Sérgio Moraes	def.	Tommy Depret	Submission (Rear-Naked Choke)	1	3:55
	Vanessa Porto	def.	Mahalia Rocha de Morais	Submission (Armbar)	1	4:28
	Alexandre Ferreira	def.	Vagner Curio	Submission (Achilles Lock)	1	0:16
	Erick Silva	def.	Jorge Luis Bezerra	Decision (Unanimous)	3	5:00
	Geronimo dos Santos	def.	Afranio Silva	TKO (Submission to punches)	2	2:48
	Nazareno Malegarie	def.	Rafael Rodrigues	Submission (Heel Hook)	3	1:51
	Mauro Chimento Jr.	def.	Gil de Freitas	Decision (Split)	3	5:00

== Jungle Fight 16 ==
Jungle Fight 16 was an event held on October 17, 2009 at The Maracanãzinho Gymnasium in Rio de Janeiro, Brazil.

=== Results ===
Main Card
Weight class				Method	Round	Time	Notes
	Brett Cooper	def.	Sérgio Moraes	KO (Punch)	2	5:00
	Alexandre Ferreira	def.	Walter Mazurkievicz	Submission (Kimura)	1	1:10
	Vanessa Porto	def.	Roberta Torno	Submission (Armbar)	1	1:47
	Geronimo dos Santos	def.	Assuério Silva	TKO (Punches)	1	1:01
	Johnny Eduardo	def.	Francisco Chagas	TKO (Leg Injury)	1	0:00
	Romario Manoel da Silva	def.	Henrique Gomes de Oliveira	Decision (Unanimous)	3	5:00
	Gil de Freitas	def.	Pedro Santos	KO (Punch)	1	1:36

== See also ==
- Jungle Fight
