= Jungle Fight =

Brazilian mixed martial arts promotion

- Industry: Mixed martial arts promotion
- Founded: 2003; 23 years ago
- Founder: Wallid Ismail and Antonio Inoki
- Headquarters: Rio de Janeiro, Brazil
- Website: https://www.junglefc.com.br/

Jungle Fight is a Brazilian mixed martial arts promotion founded in 2003 by Wallid Ismail and Antonio Inoki. Ismail partnered with Japanese martial artist and promoter Inoki to stage the inaugural event at the Ariaú Amazon Towers near Manaus, Amazonas. The promotion has operated as a developmental circuit for Brazilian fighters and many of its champions and top fighters went to sign to the UFC. Some fighters who passed through Jungle Fight include Erick Silva, Fabrício Werdum, José Aldo, Lyoto Machida, Antônio Rogério Nogueira, Johnny Walker, Alex Pereira, Ronaldo Souza, Bethe Correia, John Lineker, Renato Moicano and Natália Silva.

== History ==
Jungle Fight was created in 2003 by former Brazilian Jiu-Jitsu and MMA fighter Wallid Ismail, with the assistance of Antonio Inoki, Japanese pro wrestling legend, MMA pioneer, and Ismail's manager. The event emerged during the transition from Vale Tudo to regulated MMA in Brazil. Following the decline of major promotions like the International Vale Tudo Championship (IVC)—and despite Brazil's tradition in the sport and the existence of other events—there was a lack of platforms for new fighters to gain national and international prominence. Against this backdrop, Jungle Fight was conceived as a new showcase for Brazilian MMA, while simultaneously aiming to draw international attention to the Amazon rainforest and the need to preserve the region.

The first Jungle Fight took place on September 13, 2003, at Ariaú Amazon Towers, a luxury hotel in the middle of the Amazon jungle only reacheable by boat from Manaus, in the state of Amazonas. Ismail, who had recently retired from competition, invited Inoki to help launch the event. The card card included future UFC champions Lyoto Machida and Fabrício Werdum, as well as future veterans Ronaldo Souza, Gabriel Gonzaga, Evangelista Santos, Jorge Patino, and NJPW and future WWE pro wrestler Shinsuke Nakamura. Machida defeated future UFC Hall of Famer Stephan Bonnar, Werdum defeating Gonzaga, and Souza making his MMA debut against Jorge Patino.

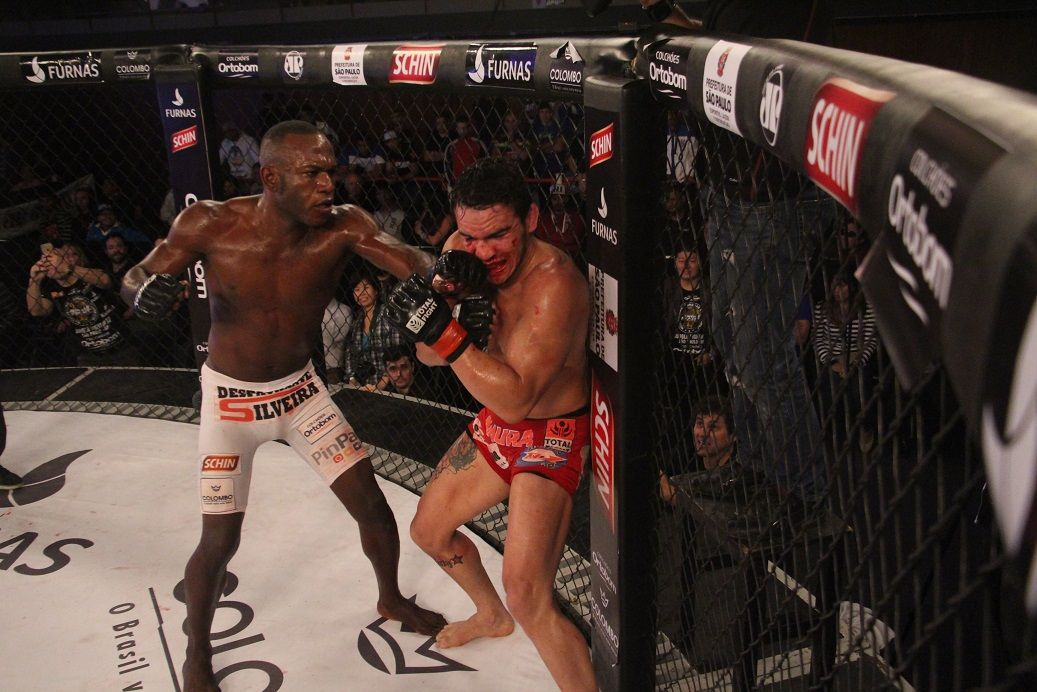
Eric Parrudo vs Cid Bad Boy at Jungle Fight 88

The promotion initially held cards in Manaus before expanding across Brazil. It staged Jungle Fight 7 in Ljubljana, Slovenia, in December 2006, followed by a hiatus in 2007 and four events in Rio de Janeiro in 2008.

For Jungle Fight 37 in March 2012, the promotion introduced a circular cage in place of its ring. Beginning with Jungle Fight 48 in January 2013, it penalized fighters who missed weight with a 20-percent purse deduction and point deductions that increased with the size of the miss. In 2015, Sherdog ranked Jungle Fight fifth among regional MMA promotions and described its post-2011 model as emphasizing prospects and developing fighters from early in their careers.

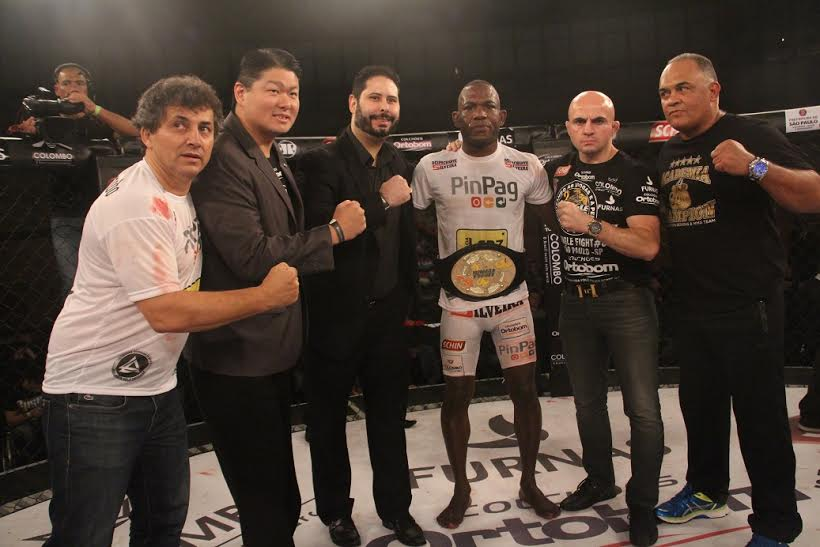
Eric Parrudo after winning a Jungle Fight title in 2018, with Wallid Ismail at right.

In February 2015, Jungle Fight signed a broadcast agreement with Rede Bandeirantes, moving to free-to-air television beginning with Jungle Fight 76 the following month. Later that year, it was announced as a promotional partner for the Rizin Fighting Federation World Grand Prix, and Jungle Fight 82 cruiserweight champion Bruno Cappelozza qualified for the tournament.

The promotion returned to Manaus for its 100th card on December 28, 2019. After Jungle Fight 102 in February 2020, the COVID-19 pandemic interrupted its schedule; competition resumed with Jungle Fight 103 in November 2021. By 2022, Jungle Fight cards were being distributed through Grupo Globo outlets. Jungle Fight 112 aired on TV Globo, while the full card was carried live through Combate, Globoplay, and SporTV 2.

By September 2023, Jungle Fight had held events in 14 Brazilian states and the Federal District, and was preparing its 120th numbered card.

In a partnership with Grupo Globo, in 2025 Jungle Fight announced the Fight do Milhão, a single-elimination tournament (a "Grand Prix") contested in two categories: men's lightweight (up to 70 kg) and women's flyweight (up to 57 kg).The prize awarded R$500,000 each, a combined R$1 million, that is the largest prize in Brazilian MMA history. The winners would also receive the titles of "King" and "Queen of the Jungle". The finals were held on October 25 at the Ibirapuera Gymnasium in São Paulo; Marcelo Medeiros won the men's tournament, while Leidiane Fernandes won the women's competition, becoming the King and Queen of the Jungle, respectively.

== Current champions ==
Division	Upper weight limit	Champion	Since	Title Defenses	Next Fight
Heavyweight	120 kg (264.6 lb)	Vacant	/	-	
Light Heavyweight	93 kg (205 lb)	Vacant	/	-	
Middleweight	84 kg (185.2 lb)	(Brazil) Vitor Costa	September 30, 2023 (Jungle Fight 120)	1	
Welterweight	77 kg (169.8 lb)	(Brazil) Anderson Nascimento	March 16, 2024 (Jungle Fight 124)	0	
Lightweight	70 kg (154.3 lb)	(Brazil) Arcangelo Oliveira	August 26, 2023 (Jungle Fight 119)	1	
Featherweight	66 kg (145.5 lb)	(Brazil) Willian Souza	July 29, 2023 (Jungle Fight 118)	1	
Bantamweight	61 kg (134.5 lb)	(Brazil) Tiago Pereira	June 24, 2023 (Jungle Fight 117)	1	
Flyweight	57 kg (125.7 lb)	(Brazil) Wagner Reis	November 25, 2023 (Jungle Fight 122)	1	
Women's Bantamweight	61 kg (134.5 lb)	(Brazil) Kelly Ottoni	July 31, 2022 (Jungle Fight 109)	1	
Women's Flyweight	57 kg (125.7 lb)	(Brazil) Elora Dana	March 26, 2023 (Jungle Fight 114)	2	
Women's Strawweight	52 kg (114.6 lb)	(Brazil) Laura Vasconcelos	July 20, 2024 (Jungle Fight 128)	0	

== Men's Championship history ==
=== Heavyweight Championship ===
Weight limit: 120 kg (264.6 lb)

No.	Name	Event	Date	Defenses
1	(Brazil) William Baldutti def. Caio Alencar	Jungle Fight 60; São Paulo, Brazil	November 2, 2013	1. def. Fabio Bondesan at Jungle Fight 72 on Aug 9, 2014
Baldutti vacated when he left the promotion.
2	(Brazil) Joao Almeida def. Henrique Silva	Jungle Fight 90; São Paulo, Brazil	September 3, 2016	
Almeida vacated to compete for Rizin.
3	(Brazil) Roggers Souza def. Marcus Vinicius Lopes	Jungle Fight 91; Contagem, Minas Gerais, Brazil	July 15, 2017	
Souza vacated when he left the promotion.
4	(Brazil) Andre Miranda def. Fernando Batista	Jungle Fight 98; Belo Horizonte, Minas Gerais, Brazil	November 23, 2019	
Miranda vacated when he left the promotion.

=== Cruiserweight Championship ===
Weight limit: 100 kg (220.5 lb)

No.	Name	Event	Date	Defenses
1	(Brazil) Bruno Cappelozza def. Sandro Bezerra	Jungle Fight 82; São Paulo, Brazil	October 24, 2015	
Cappelozza vacated to compete at light heavyweight.

=== Light Heavyweight Championship ===
Weight limit: 93 kg (205.0 lb)

No.	Name	Event	Date	Defenses
1	(Brazil) Kleber Silva def. Aldo Silva	Jungle Fight 37; São Paulo, Brazil	March 31, 2012	
Silva vacated to compete at middleweight.
2	(Brazil) Dirlei Broenstrup def. Martin Ottaviano	Jungle Fight 74; São Paulo, Brazil	November 29, 2014	1. def. Gustavo Garrido at Jungle Fight 77 on May 9, 2015; 2. def. Marcus Lopes at Jungle Fight 84 on Dec 5, 2015
Broenstrup vacated when he left the promotion.
3	(Brazil) Bruno Cappelozza def. Klidson Abreu	Jungle Fight 87; São Paulo, Brazil	May 21, 2016	
Cappelozza vacated when he left the promotion.

=== Middleweight Championship ===
Weight limit: 84 kg (185.2 lb)

No.	Name	Event	Date	Defenses
1	(Brazil) Ildemar Alcantara def. Itamar Rosa	Jungle Fight 47; Porto Alegre, Brazil	December 21, 2012	
Alcantara vacated to compete for the UFC.
2	(Brazil) Antonio dos Santos Jr. def. Douglas Bertazini	Jungle Fight 74; São Paulo, Brazil	November 29, 2014	
dos Santos vacated to compete for the UFC.
3	(Brazil) Andre Lobato def. Alexandre Hoffmann	Jungle Fight 80; São Paulo, Brazil	August 22, 2015	
Lobato vacated to compete for the PFL.
4	(Brazil) Paulo Costa def. Eduardo Ramon	Jungle Fight 87; São Paulo, Brazil	May 21, 2016	1. def. Adriano Balby at Jungle Fight 90 on May 9, 2015
Costa vacated to compete for the UFC.
5	(Brazil) Marcelo Barbosa def. Marcus Vinicius	Jungle Fight 94; Contagem, Minas Gerais, Brazil	December 22, 2018	
6	(Brazil) Claudio Cesario	Jungle Fight 102; Rio de Janeiro, Brazil	February 15, 2020	
Cesario vacated to compete for Absolute Championship Akhmat.
7	(Brazil) Vitor Costa def. Rafael Silva	Jungle Fight 120; Vila Velha, Brazil	September 30, 2023	1. def. Eduardo Garvon at Jungle Fight 128 on July 20, 2024

=== Welterweight Championship ===
Weight limit: 77 kg (169.8 lb)

No.	Name	Event	Date	Defenses
1	(Brazil) Elias Silverio def. Junior Orgulho	Jungle Fight 52; Belem, Brazil	May 4, 2013	
Silverio vacated to compete for the UFC.
2	(Brazil) Rodrigo de Lima def. Gabriel Toussaint	Jungle Fight 63; Belem, Brazil	December 21, 2013	
de Lima vacated to compete for the UFC.
3	(Brazil) Elizeu Zaleski dos Santos def. Itamar Rosa	Jungle Fight 71; São Paulo, Brazil	July 19, 2014	1. def. Eduardo Ramon at Jungle Fight 75 on Dec 18, 2014
Zaleski dos Santos vacated to compete for the UFC.
4	(Brazil) Bruno Lopes def. Jose Diaz	Jungle Fight 76; Itu, Sao Paulo, Brazil	April 11, 2015	
Lopes vacated when he left the promotion.
5	(Brazil) Handesson Ferreira def. Carlos Alberto Silva	Jungle Fight 84; São Paulo, Brazil	December 5, 2015	1. def. Jorge Filho at Jungle Fight 88 on Jun 25, 2016
Ferreira vacated when he left the promotion.
6	(Brazil) Bruce Souto def. Eduardo Rufino	Jungle Fight 91; Contagem, Minas Gerais, Brazil	July 15, 2017	
Souto vacated when he left the promotion.
7	(Brazil) Wilker Lemos def. Quemuel Ottoni	Jungle Fight 95; Rio de Janeiro, Brazil	September 28, 2019	1. def. Alessandro Gambulino at Jungle Fight 100 on Dec 28, 2019
Lemos vacated to compete for Absolute Championship Akhmat.
8	(Brazil) Quemuel Ottoni def. Jose Diaz	Jungle Fight 107; São Paulo, Brazil	May 1, 2022	
Ottoni vacated to compete for the PFL.
9	(Brazil) Vanderlei Goncalves def. Jeferson Costa	Jungle Fight 114; Manaus, Amazonas, Brazil	March 26, 2023	
10	(Brazil) Arcangelo Oliveira	Jungle Fight 116; São Paulo, Brazil	May 27, 2023	
Oliveira vacated.
11	(Brazil) Anderson Nascimento def. Cesar Augustos Mendes	Jungle Fight 124; Aracaju, Sergipe, Brazil	March 16, 2024	
—	(Brazil) Vanderlei Goncalves def.Glebson Monteiro for interim title	Jungle Fight 127; São Paulo, Brazil	June 8, 2024	

=== Lightweight Championship ===
Weight limit: 70 kg (154.3 lb)

No.	Name	Event	Date	Defenses
1	(Brazil) Adriano Martins def. Jimmy Donahue	Jungle Fight 37; São Paulo, Brazil	March 31, 2012	
Martins vacated to compete for Strikeforce.
2	(Brazil) Lucio Abreu def. Sean Peters	Jungle Fight 49; Rio de Janeiro, Brazil	February 22, 2013	
3	(Brazil) Ivan Jorge	Jungle Fight 54; Rio de Janeiro, Brazil	June 29, 2013	
Jorge vacated to compete for the UFC.
4	(Brazil) Tiago Trator def. Geraldo Neto	Jungle Fight 59; Rio de Janeiro, Brazil	October 12, 2013	1. def. Ary Santos at Jungle Fight 65 on Feb 2, 2014
Trator vacated to compete for the UFC.
5	(Brazil) Ciro Rodrigues def. Diogo Cavalcanti	Jungle Fight 78; São Paulo, Brazil	June 20, 2015	
6	(Brazil) Erick Barbosa	Jungle Fight 82; São Paulo, Brazil	October 24, 2015	1. def. interim champion Rander Junio at Jungle Fight 88 on Jun 25, 2016; 2. def. Cleiton Silva at Jungle Fight 92 on Sep 30, 2019
—	(Brazil) Rander Junio def. Michel Silva for interim title	Jungle Fight 85; São Paulo, Brazil	January 23, 2016	
Barbosa vacated when he left the promotion.
7	(Brazil) Max Denner def. Elysson Machado	Jungle Fight 96; Belo Horizonte, Minas Gerais, Brazil	October 19, 2019	
Denner vacated when he left the promotion.
8	(Brazil) Lucas Almeida def. Nico Cocuccio	Jungle Fight 99; Rio de Janeiro, Brazil	November 30, 2019	1. def. Italo Trindade at Jungle Fight 103 on Nov 28, 2021
Almeida vacated to compete for the UFC.
9	(Brazil) Henerson Duarte def. Joelson Pantoja	Jungle Fight 104; São Paulo, Brazil	December 28, 2021	
10	(Brazil) John David	Jungle Fight 109; São Paulo, Brazil	July 31, 2022	
11	(Brazil) Kaynan Kruschewsky	Jungle Fight 113; São Paulo, Brazil	December 11, 2022	1. def. Thierry Lucas at Jungle Fight 115 on Apr 29, 2023
Kruschewsky vacated to compete for the UFC.
12	(Brazil) Arcangelo Oliveira def. Lucas Campos	Jungle Fight 119; São Paulo, Brazil	August 26, 2023	1. def. interim champion Marcelo Medeiros at Jungle Fight 125 on April 27, 2024
—	(Brazil) Marcelo Medeiros def. Lucas Campos for interim title	Jungle Fight 123; São Paulo, Brazil	December 16, 2023	
13	(Brazil) Carlos Alexandre def. Lucas Codutti	Jungle Fight 134; São Paulo, Brazil	January 18, 2025	
14	(Brazil) Marcelo Medeiros def. Arcangelo Oliveira	Jungle Fight 141; São Paulo, Brazil	October 25, 2025	

=== Featherweight Championship ===
Weight limit: 66 kg (145.5 lb)

No.	Name	Event	Date	Defenses
1	(Brazil) Edimilson Souza def. Fabiano Nogueira	Jungle Fight 51; Rio de Janeiro, Brazil	April 26, 2013	
—	(Brazil) Rafael Miranda def. Fabiano Silva for interim title	Jungle Fight 57; Belem, Para, Brazil	September 7, 2013	
Souza vacated to compete for the UFC.
2	(Brazil) Rafael Miranda promoted to undisputed champion	–	?	
3	(Brazil) Alexandre de Almeida	Jungle Fight 62; São Paulo, Brazil	December 7, 2013	
—	(Brazil) Renato Moicano def. Ismael Bonfim for interim title	Jungle Fight 71; São Paulo, Brazil	July 19, 2014	
Moicano vacated to compete for the UFC.
de Almeida vacated to compete for the WSOF.
4	(Brazil) Jonas Bilharinho def. Fabiano Nogueira	Jungle Fight 76; Itu, Sao Paulo, Brazil	April 11, 2015	
Bilharinho vacated when he left the promotion.
5	(Brazil) Otto Rodrigues def. Luiz Carlos Silva	Jungle Fight 79; Rio de Janeiro, Brazil	July 4, 2015	1. def. Deroci Barbosa at Jungle Fight 83 on Nov 28, 2015
Rodrigues vacated when he left the promotion.
6	(Brazil) Valdines Silva def. Jonas Bilharinho	Jungle Fight 86; Palmas, Tocantins, Brazil	April 30, 2016	
Silva vacated to compete for Absolute Championship Berkut.
7	(Brazil) Felipe Colares def. Caio Gregorio	Jungle Fight 92; Belo Horizonte, Minas Gerais, Brazil	September 30, 2017	
Colares vacated to compete for the UFC.
8	(Brazil) Willian Souza def. Deberson Batista	Jungle Fight 101; Contagem, Minas Gerais, Brazil	January 31, 2020	
Souza vacated.
9	(Brazil) Julio Pereira def. Caique Costa	Jungle Fight 105; Manaus, Amazonas, Brazil	February 13, 2022	1. def. Deberson Batista at Jungle Fight 108 on Jun 19, 2022
Souza vacated.
10	(Brazil) Bruno Fontes def. Caique Costa	Jungle Fight 111; São Paulo, Brazil	September 18, 2022	1. def. Willian Souza at Jungle Fight 113 on Dec 11, 2022
Fontes vacated.
11	(Brazil) Willian Souza (2) def. Julio Pereira	Jungle Fight 118; Aracaju, Sergipe, Brazil	July 29, 2023	1. def. Daniel Henrique Santos at Jungle Fight 124 on March 16, 2024

=== Bantamweight Championship ===
Weight limit: 61 kg (134.5 lb)

No.	Name	Event	Date	Defenses
1	(Brazil) Mario Israel def. Reginaldo Vieira	Jungle Fight 56; Foz do Iguacu, Brazil	August 24, 2013	
2	(Brazil) Jonas Bilharinho	Jungle Fight 67; Foz do Iguacu, Brazil	March 29, 2014	
Bilharinho vacated to compete at featherweight.
3	(Brazil) Maike Linhares def. Rodrigo Praia	Jungle Fight 81; Palmas, Tocantins, Brazil	September 12, 2015	
4	(Brazil) Josenaldo Silva	Jungle Fight 86; Palmas, Tocantins, Brazil	April 30, 2016	
Silva vacated when he left the promotion.
5	(Brazil) Eduardo Souza def. Francisco Figueiredo	Jungle Fight 91; Contagem, Minas Gerais, Brazil	July 15, 2017	1. drew with interim champion Francisco Figueiredo at Jungle Fight 95 on Sep 28, 2019
—	(Brazil) Francisco Figueiredo def. Manoel dos Santos for interim title	Jungle Fight 93; Belem, Para, Brazil	April 28, 2018	
—	(Brazil) Carlos Soares def. Elifrank Cariolano for interim title	Jungle Fight 94; Contagem, Minas Gerais, Brazil	December 22, 2018	
Soares vacated when he left the promotion.
Souza vacated when he left the promotion.
6	(Brazil) Klinger Pinheiro def. Antonio Rodriguez	Jungle Fight 100; Contagem, Minas Gerais, Brazil	December 28, 2019	
Pinheiro vacated when he left the promotion.
7	(Brazil) Willian Souza def. Pacceli Afonso	Jungle Fight 106; Santa Luzia, Minas Gerais, Brazil	March 27, 2022	
Souza vacated to return to featherweight.
8	(Brazil) Marcirley Alves def. Julio Pereira	Jungle Fight 113; São Paulo, Brazil	December 11, 2022	
Souza vacated to compete for Bellator MMA.
9	(Brazil) Tiago Pereira def. Carlos Soares	Jungle Fight 117; Rio de Janeiro, Brazil	June 24, 2023	1. def. interim champion Vinicius Alves at Jungle Fight 122 on Nov 25, 2023
—	(Brazil) João Pedro Saldanha def. Ronaldo Ferreira for interim title	Jungle Fight 126; Brasilia, Brazil	May 25, 2024	

=== Flyweight Championship ===
Weight limit: 57 kg (125.7 lb)

No.	Name	Event	Date	Defenses
1	(Brazil) Arinaldo Batista def. Sidney Oliveira	Jungle Fight 47; Porto Alegre, Brazil	December 21, 2012	
—	(Brazil) Robson Souza def. Wagner Noronha for interim title	Jungle Fight 50; Novo Hamburgo, Brazil	April 6, 2013	
Souza vacated when he left the promotion.
2	(Brazil) Rayner Silva	Jungle Fight 53; Rio de Janeiro, Brazil	June 1, 2013	1. def. interim champion Junior Boya at Jungle Fight 58 on Sep 14, 2013; 2. def. Sidney Oliveira at Jungle Fight 64 on Jan 17, 2014
—	(Brazil) Junior Boya def. Marcos Vinicius for interim title	Jungle Fight 55; Rio de Janeiro, Brazil	July 20, 2013	
3	(Brazil) Nildo Nascimento	Jungle Fight 69; Ito, Sao Paulo, Brazil	May 3, 2014	1. def. Wilker Leandro at Jungle Fight 75 on Dec 18, 2014
4	(Brazil) Bruno Menezes	Jungle Fight 77; Foz do Iguacu, Brazil	May 9, 2015	1. def. Jose Alexandre at Jungle Fight 80 on Aug 22, 2015
—	(Brazil) Paulo Oliveira def. Herbeth Sousa for interim title	Jungle Fight 89; São Paulo, Brazil	July 30, 2016	
Oliveira vacated.
Menezes vacated.
5	(Brazil) Denis Araujo def. Bruno Menezes	Jungle Fight 92; Belo Horizonte, Minas Gerais, Brazil	September 30, 2017	
—	(Brazil) Ivanildo Delfino def. Antonio Macedo for interim title	Jungle Fight 93; Belem, Para, Brazil	April 28, 2018	
Delfino vacated when he left the promotion.
Araujo vacated when he left the promotion.
7	(Brazil) Kleydson Rodrigues def. Eduardo Henrique	Jungle Fight 97; Rio de Janeiro, Brazil	October 26, 2019	
Rodrigues vacated to compete for the UFC.
8	(Brazil) Felipe Pereira def. Rafael Montouro	Jungle Fight 103; São Paulo, Brazil	November 28, 2021	
Rodrigues vacated when he left the promotion.
9	(Brazil) Igor da Silva def. Manoel Rodrigues	Jungle Fight 110; Rio de Janeiro, Brazil	August 27, 2022	
da Silva vacated to compete on Dana White's Contender Series.
10	(Brazil) Manoel Silva def. Luiz Paulo Barbosa	Jungle Fight 117; Rio de Janeiro, Brazil	June 24, 2023	
11	(Brazil) Wagner Reis	Jungle Fight 122; São Paulo, Brazil	November 25, 2023	1. def. Luiz Paulo Barbosa at Jungle Fight 125 on April 27, 2024

=== Strawweight Championship ===
Weight limit: 52 kg (114.6 lb)

No.	Name	Event	Date	Defenses
1	(Brazil) Gilberto Dias def. Fabio Henrique	Jungle Fight 90; São Paulo, Brazil	September 3, 2016	
Dias vacated when he left the promotion.

== Women's Championship history ==
=== Women's Bantamweight Championship ===
Weight limit: 61 kg (134.5 lb)

No.	Name	Event	Date	Defenses
1	(Brazil) Larissa Pacheco def. Irene Aldana	Jungle Fight 63; Belem, Brazil	December 21, 2013	
Pacheco vacated to compete for the UFC.
2	(Brazil) Amanda Lemos def. Carol Cunha	Jungle Fight 82; São Paulo, Brazil	October 24, 2015	1. drew with Mayra Cantuaria at Jungle Fight 85 on Jan 23, 2016; 2. def. Mayra Cantuaria at Jungle Fight 88 on Jun 25, 2016
Lemos vacated to compete for the UFC.
3	(Brazil) Kelly Ottoni def. Yana Gadelha	Jungle Fight 107; São Paulo, Brazil	May 1, 2022	1. def. Layze Cerqueira at Jungle Fight 109 on Jul 31, 2022

=== Women's Flyweight Championship ===
Weight limit: 57 kg (125.7 lb)

No.	Name	Event	Date	Defenses
1	(Brazil) Simone da Silva def. Bianca Daimoni	Jungle Fight 89; São Paulo, Brazil	July 30, 2016	
da Silva vacated when he left the promotion.
2	(Brazil) Natalia Silva def. Gabriela Marcal	Jungle Fight 96; Belo Horizonte, Minas Gerais, Brazil	October 19, 2019	1. def. Joice Mara at Jungle Fight 100 on Dec 28, 2019
Silva vacated to compete for the UFC.
3	(Brazil) Elora Dana def. Andreyna Rocha	Jungle Fight 114; Manaus, Amazonas, Brazil	March 26, 2023	1. def. Faelly Vitoria at Jungle Fight 116 on May 27, 2023; 2. def. interim champion Brena Cardozo at Jungle Fight 126 on May 25, 2024
—	(Brazil) Brena Cardozo def. Layze Cerqueira for interim title	Jungle Fight 121; São Paulo, Brazil	October 28, 2023	

=== Women's Strawweight Championship ===
Weight limit: 52 kg (114.6 lb)

No.	Name	Event	Date	Defenses
1	(Brazil) Ericka Almeida def. Maiara Amanajas	Jungle Fight 73; São Paulo, Brazil	September 6, 2014	1. def. Jennifer Gonzalez at Jungle Fight 76 on Apr 11, 2015
Almeida vacated to compete for the UFC.
2	(Brazil) Amanda Ribas def. Tania Pereda	Jungle Fight 79; Rio de Janeiro, Brazil	July 4, 2015	
3	(Brazil) Polyana Viana	Jungle Fight 83; Rio de Janeiro, Brazil	November 28, 2015	1. def. Debra Dias at Jungle Fight 87 on May 21, 2016
Viana vacated when he left the promotion.
4	(Brazil) Stephanie Luciano def. Karina Aryadne	Jungle Fight 112; São Paulo, Brazil	November 13, 2022	
Viana vacated to compete for the UFC.
5	(Brazil) Faelly Vitoria def. Karina Aryadne	Jungle Fight 119; São Paulo, Brazil	August 26, 2023	
6	(Brazil) Laura Vasconcelos	Jungle Fight 128; São Paulo, Brazil	July 20, 2024	

== Kickboxing Championship history ==
=== Middleweight Championship ===
Weight limit: 84 kg (185.2 lb)

No.	Name	Event	Date	Defenses
1	(Brazil) Alex Pereira def. Clei Silva	Jungle Fight 37; São Paulo, Brazil	March 31, 2012	
Pereira vacated to compete for WGP Kickboxing.

== Events ==
#	Event title	Date	Arena	Location
127	Jungle Fight 125	April 27, 2024		São Paulo, Brazil
126	Jungle Fight 124	March 16, 2024		Aracaju, Brazil
125	Jungle Fight 123	December 16, 2023		São Paulo, Brazil
124	Jungle Fight 122	November 25, 2023		São Paulo, Brazil
123	Jungle Fight 121	October 28, 2023	Arena Renascer	São Paulo, Brazil
122	Jungle Fight 120	September 30, 2023	Ginásio Tartarugão	Vila Velha, Brazil
121	Jungle Fight 119	August 26, 2023		São Paulo, Brazil
120	Jungle Fight 118	July 29, 2023		Aracaju, Brazil
119	Jungle Fight 117	June 24, 2023	Centro Esportivo Miécimo da Silva	Rio de Janeiro, Brazil
118	Jungle Fight 116	May 27, 2023		São Paulo, Brazil
117	Jungle Fight 115	April 29, 2023	Centro Esportivo Lapa	São Paulo, Brazil
116	Jungle Fight 114	March 26, 2023	Amadeu Teixeira Arena	Manaus, Brazil
115	Jungle Fight 113	December 11, 2022		São Paulo, Brazil
114	Jungle Fight 112	November 13, 2022		São Paulo, Brazil
113	Jungle Fight 111	September 17, 2022		São Paulo, Brazil
112	Jungle Fight 110	August 27, 2022	Vila Olimpica Nilton Santos	Rio de Janeiro, Brazil
111	Jungle Fight 109	July 31, 2022	Clube Pelezão	São Paulo, Brazil
110	Jungle Fight 108	June 19, 2022	Amadeu Teixeira Arena	Manaus, Brazil
109	Jungle Fight 107	May 1, 2022	Clube Pelezão	São Paulo, Brazil
108	Jungle Fight 106	March 27, 2022	Arena Gran Hall	Santa Luzia, Brazil
107	Jungle Fight 105	February 13, 2022	Centro de Convenções Vasco Vasques	Manaus, Brazil
106	Jungle Fight 104	December 28, 2021	Clube Pelezão	São Paulo, Brazil
105	Jungle Fight 103	November 28, 2021	Clube Pelezão	São Paulo, Brazil
104	Jungle Fight 102	February 15, 2020	Vila Olímpica do Mato Alto	Rio de Janeiro, Brazil
103	Jungle Fight 101	January 31, 2020	Ginásio Poliesportivo do Riacho	Contagem, Brazil
102	Jungle Fight 100	December 28, 2019	Amadeu Teixeira Arena	Manaus, Brazil
101	Jungle Fight 99	November 30, 2019	Vila Olímpica do Mato Alto	Rio de Janeiro, Brazil
100	Jungle Fight 98	November 23, 2019	Clube Labareda	Belo Horizonte, Brazil
99	Jungle Fight 97	October 26, 2019	Unisuam Gymnasium	Bonsucesso, Brazil
98	Jungle Fight 96	October 19, 2019	Clube Labareda	Belo Horizonte, Brazil
97	Jungle Fight 95	September 28, 2019	Jardim Guanabara Yacht Club	Rio de Janeiro, Brazil
96	Jungle Fight 94	December 22, 2018	Quinto Sportmall	Contagem, Brazil
95	Jungle Fight Qualifying: Quinto Fight Night	October 6, 2018	Quinto Sportmall	Contagem, Brazil
94	Jungle Fight 93	April 28, 2018	Hangar	Belém, Brazil
93	Jungle Fight 92	September 30, 2017	Ginásio Mineirinho	Belo Horizonte, Brazil
92	Jungle Fight 91	July 15, 2017	Ginásio Poliesportivo do Riacho	Contagem, Brazil
91	Jungle Fight 90	September 30, 2016	Ginásio Mauro Pinheiro	São Paulo, Brazil
90	Jungle Fight 89	July 30, 2016	Ginásio Mauro Pinheiro	São Paulo, Brazil
89	Jungle Fight 88	June 25, 2016	Arthur de Mendonça Chaves Gymnasium	Poços de Caldas, Brazil
88	Jungle Fight 87	May 24, 2016	Ginásio do Ibirapuera	São Paulo, Brazil
87	Jungle Fight 86	April 30, 2016	Ginásio Ayrton Senna	Palmas, Brazil
86	Jungle Fight 85	January 20, 2016	Ginásio do Morumbi	São Paulo, Brazil
85	Jungle Fight 84	December 5, 2015	Ginásio do Morumbi	São Paulo, Brazil
84	Jungle Fight 83	November 28, 2015	Sede do Botafogo de Futebol e Regatas	Rio de Janeiro, Brazil
83	Jungle Fight 82	October 24, 2015	Ginásio do Morumbi	São Paulo, Brazil
82	Jungle Fight 81	September 12, 2015	Ginásio Ayrton Senna	Palmas, Brazil
81	Jungle Fight 80	August 22, 2015	Ginásio do Morumbi	São Paulo, Brazil
80	Jungle Fight 79	July 4, 2015	Centro Esportivo Miécimo da Silva	Rio de Janeiro, Brazil
79	Jungle Fight 78	June 20, 2015	Clube Sírio	São Paulo, Brazil
78	Jungle Fight 77	May 9, 2015	Ginásio Costa Cavalcanti	Foz do Iguaçu, Brazil
77	Jungle Fight 76	April 11, 2015	Prudente de Morais Municipal Gymnasium	Itu, Brazil
76	Jungle Fight 75	December 18, 2014	Para State University (UEPA) Gymnasium	Belém, Brazil
75	Jungle Fight 74	November 29, 2014	Ibirapuera Gymnasium	São Paulo, Brazil
74	Jungle Fight 73 - Special Edition 11th Anniversary	September 6, 2014	Ibirapuera Gymnasium	São Paulo, Brazil
73	Jungle Fight 72 - Jungle Community: São Paulo	August 9, 2014	Edson Arantes do Nascimento (Pelezao) Gymnasium	São Paulo, Brazil
72	Jungle Fight 71	July 19, 2014	Ginasio do Canindé	São Paulo, Brazil
71	Jungle Fight 70 - Jungle Favela 2	May 17, 2014	Madureira Viaduct	Rio de Janeiro, Brazil
70	Jungle Fight 69	May 3, 2014	Prudente de Morais Municipal Gymnasium	Itu, Brazil
69	Jungle Fight 68	April 5, 2014	Pacaembu Gymnasium	São Paulo, Brazil
68	Jungle Fight 67	March 29, 2014	Ginásio Costa Cavalcanti	Foz do Iguacu, Brazil
67	Jungle Fight 66 - Jungle Favela	March 8, 2014	Madureira Viaduct	Rio de Janeiro, Brazil
66	Jungle Fight 65	February 2, 2014		Madre de Deus, Brazil
65	Jungle Fight 64	January 17, 2014	Farol de Sao Tome Beach	Campos dos Goytacazes, Brazil
64	Jungle Fight 63	December 21, 2013	Para State University (UEPA) Gymnasium	Belém, Brazil
63	Jungle Fight 62	December 7, 2013		São Paulo, Brazil
62	Jungle Fight 61	November 23, 2013	Waldir Pereira Gymnasium	Campos dos Goytacazes, Brazil
61	Jungle Fight 60	November 2, 2013	Pelezao Gymnasium	São Paulo, Brazil
60	Jungle Fight 59	October 12, 2013		Rio de Janeiro, Brazil
59	Jungle Fight 58	September 14, 2013	Portuguesa Gymnasium	São Paulo, Brazil
58	Jungle Fight 57	September 7, 2013	Para State University Gymnasium	Belém, Brazil
57	Jungle Fight 56	August 24, 2013	Ginásio Costa Cavalcanti	Foz do Iguaçu, Brazil
56	Jungle Fight 55	July 20, 2013	Botafogo Soccer and Rowing Club Gymnasium	Rio de Janeiro, Brazil
55	Jungle Fight 54	June 29, 2013	Ginásio Barra Tênis	Barra do Piraí, Brazil
54	Jungle Fight 53	June 1, 2013	Paço Municipal	Japeri, Brazil
53	Jungle Fight 52	May 4, 2013	Para State University (UEPA) Gymnasium	Belém, Brazil
52	Jungle Fight 51	April 26, 2013	Ginásio do Botafogo Futebol e Regatas	Rio de Janeiro, Brazil
51	Jungle Fight 50	April 6, 2013	Sociedade Ginástica Novo Hamburgo	Novo Hamburgo, Brazil
50	Jungle Fight 49	February 22, 2013	Ginásio da AABB da Lagoa	Rio de Janeiro, Brazil
49	Jungle Fight 48	January 25, 2013	Ginásio da Portuguesa	São Paulo, Brazil
48	Jungle Fight - Jungle Comunidade 1	December 23, 2012	Espaço Ferrini	Engenheiro Paulo de Frontin, Brazil
47	Jungle Fight 47	December 21, 2012	Osmar Fortes Barcellos Municipal Gym	Porto Alegre, Brazil
46	Jungle Fight 46	December 13, 2012	Clube Escola Ibirapuera (Mané Garrincha)	São Paulo, Brazil
45	Jungle Fight 45	November 15, 2012	Ginásio da UEPA (Universidade Estadual do Pará)	Belém, Brazil
44	Jungle Fight 44	October 27, 2012	Bank of Brazil Athletic Association Gymnasium	Rio de Janeiro, Brazil
43	Jungle Fight 43	September 29, 2012	Lapa College Arena	São Paulo, Brazil
42	Jungle Fight 42	August 18, 2012	Pacaembu Gymnasium	São Paulo, Brazil
41	Jungle Fight 41	July 28, 2012	Prudente de Moraes Gymnasium	Itu, Brazil
40	Jungle Fight 40	June 15, 2012	Cupertino Ramos Gymnasium	Macapá, Brazil
39	Jungle Fight 39	May 12, 2012	Tijuca's Municipal Club	Rio de Janeiro, Brazil
38	Jungle Fight 38	April 28, 2012	Pará State University Gymnasium	Belém, Brazil
37	Jungle Fight 37	March 31, 2012	Ibirapuera Gymnasium	São Paulo, Brazil
36	Jungle Fight 36	January 21, 2012	Block of Rocinha	Rio de Janeiro, Brazil
35	Jungle Fight 35	December 17, 2011	Pacaembu Gymnasium	São Paulo, Brazil
34	Jungle Fight 34	November 26, 2011	Block of Mangueira	Rio de Janeiro, Brazil
33	Jungle Fight 33	October 21, 2011	Cidade de Deus (Rio de Janeiro)	Rio de Janeiro, Brazil
32	Jungle Fight 32	September 10, 2011	Ibirapuera Gymnasium	São Paulo, Brazil
31	Jungle Fight 31	August 20, 2011	Prudente de Moraes Gymnasium	Itu, Brazil
30	Jungle Fight 30	July 30, 2011	Pará State University Gymnasium	Belém, Brazil
29	Jungle Fight 29	June 25, 2011	Hércules Antônio Pereira Miranda Gymnasium	Serra, Brazil
28	Jungle Fight 28	May 21, 2011	Flamengo Rowing Club Gymnasium	Rio de Janeiro, Brazil
27	Jungle Fight 27	April 21, 2011	Nilson Nelson Gymnasium	Brasília, Brazil
26	Jungle Fight 26	April 2, 2011	Pacaembu Gymnasium	São Paulo, Brazil
25	Jungle Fight 25	February 19, 2011	President Joao Goulart Sports Gymnasium	Vila Velha, Brazil
24	Jungle Fight 24	December 18, 2010	Flamengo Rowing Club Gymnasium	Rio de Janeiro, Brazil
23	Jungle Fight 23	October 30, 2010	Pará State University Gymnasium	Belém, Brazil
22	Jungle Fight 22	September 18, 2010	Ibirapuera Gymnasium	São Paulo, Brazil
21	Jungle Fight 21	July 31, 2010	Nélio Dias Gymnasium	Natal, Brazil
20	Jungle Fight 20	May 22, 2010	Pacaembu Gymnasium	São Paulo, Brazil
19	Jungle Fight 19: Warriors 3	April 17, 2010	Mané Garrincha Stadium	São Paulo, Brazil
18	Jungle Fight 18: São Paulo	March 20, 2010	Pacaembu Gymnasium	São Paulo, Brazil
17	Jungle Fight 17: Vila Velha	February 27, 2010	Costa Beach	Vila Velha, Brazil
16	Jungle Fight 16	October 17, 2009	Maracanãzinho Gymnasium	Rio de Janeiro, Brazil
15	Jungle Fight 15	September 19, 2009	Pacaembu Gymnasium	São Paulo, Brazil
14	Jungle Fight 14: Ceará	May 9, 2009	Paulo Sarasate Gymnasium	Fortaleza, Brazil
13	Jungle Fight 13: Qualifying Fortaleza	March 28, 2009	Fighter Sport Academy	Fortaleza, Brazil
12	Jungle Fight 12: Warriors 2	March 21, 2009	Team Nogueira Training Center	Rio de Janeiro, Brazil
11	Jungle Fight 11	September 13, 2008	Windsor Barra Hotel	Rio de Janeiro, Brazil
10	Jungle Fight 10	July 12, 2008	Windsor Barra Hotel	Rio de Janeiro, Brazil
9	Jungle Fight 9: Warriors	May 31, 2008	Maracanãzinho Gymnasium	Rio de Janeiro, Brazil
8	Jungle Fight 8	April 6, 2008	Team Nogueira Training Center	Rio de Janeiro, Brazil
7	Jungle Fight Europe	December 17, 2006	Dvorana Tivoli	Ljubljana, Slovenia
6	Jungle Fight 6	April 29, 2006	Tropical Hotel	Manaus, Brazil
5	Jungle Fight 5	November 26, 2005	Tropical Hotel	Manaus, Brazil
4	Jungle Fight 4	May 21, 2005	Tropical Hotel	Manaus, Brazil
3	Jungle Fight 3	October 23, 2004	Tropical Hotel	Manaus, Brazil
2	Jungle Fight 2	May 15, 2004	Studio 5 Festival Mall Manaus	Manaus, Brazil
1	Jungle Fight 1	September 13, 2003	Ariaú Amazon Towers	Manaus, Brazil
