= 2011 in Jungle Fight =

Information
- First date: February 19, 2011
- Last date: December 17, 2011

Events
- Total events: 11

Fights
- Total fights: 77

Chronology
2010 in Jungle Fight	2011 in Jungle Fight	2012 in Jungle Fight

The year 2011 is the ninth year in the history of Jungle Fight, a mixed martial arts promotion based in Brazil. In 2011 Jungle Fight held 11 events beginning with, Jungle Fight 25.

== Events list ==
#	Event title	Date	Arena	Location
35	Jungle Fight 35	December 17, 2011	Pacaembu Gymnasium	São Paulo, Brazil
34	Jungle Fight 34	November 26, 2011	Block of Mangueira	Rio de Janeiro, Brazil
33	Jungle Fight 33	October 21, 2011	Cidade de Deus (Rio de Janeiro)	Rio de Janeiro, Brazil
32	Jungle Fight 32	September 10, 2011	Ibirapuera Gymnasium	São Paulo, Brazil
31	Jungle Fight 31	August 20, 2011	Prudente de Moraes Gymnasium	Itu, Brazil
30	Jungle Fight 30	July 30, 2011	Pará State University Gymnasium	Belém, Brazil
29	Jungle Fight 29	June 25, 2011	Hércules Antônio Pereira Miranda Gymnasium	Serra, Brazil
28	Jungle Fight 28	May 21, 2011	Flamengo Rowing Club Gymnasium	Rio de Janeiro, Brazil
27	Jungle Fight 27	April 21, 2011	Nilson Nelson Gymnasium	Brasília, Brazil
26	Jungle Fight 26	April 2, 2011	Pacaembu Gymnasium	São Paulo, Brazil
25	Jungle Fight 25	February 19, 2011	President Joao Goulart Sports Gymnasium	Vila Velha, Brazil

== Jungle Fight 25 ==
Jungle Fight 25 was an event held on February 19, 2011 at President Joao Goulart Sports Gymnasium in Vila Velha, Brazil.

=== Results ===
Main Card
Weight class				Method	Round	Time	Notes
	Luis Sergio Melo Jr.	def.	Edilberto De Oliveira	Decision (Split)	3	5:00
	Renato Moicano	def.	Joao Luiz Nogueira	Decision (Unanimous)	3	5:00
	Francisco Trinaldo	def.	Joao Paulo Rodrigues de Souza	Decision (Unanimous)	3	5:00
	Marcelo Guimaraes	def.	Paulo Henrique Garcia Rodrigues	Decision (Unanimous)	3	5:00
	Wilians Santos	def.	Ascir Caetano da Silva Jr.	TKO (Doctor Stoppage)	3	0:00
	Ednaldo Oliveira	def.	Antidio Neto	KO (Punch)	1	1:03
	Luis Guilherme de Andrade	def.	Valdir Silva Sabino	TKO (Punches)	1	3:40

== Jungle Fight 26 ==
Jungle Fight 26 was an event held on April 2, 2011 at Pacaembu Gymnasium in São Paulo, Brazil.

=== Results ===
Main Card
Weight class				Method	Round	Time	Notes
	Wendell De Oliveira Marques	def.	Gil De Freitas	Decision (Split)	3	5:00
	Lucas Rodolfo Bresolin Rota	def.	Gilberto Galvao	Decision (Split)	3	5:00
	Adriano Martins	def.	Nilson Assuncao	TKO (Corner Stoppage)	1	0:00
	Eduardo Felipe	def.	Vinicius Zani	Decision (Split)	3	5:00
	Iliarde Santos	def.	Antenor Pereira	Submission (Heel Hook)	1	1:10
	Thiago de Oliveira Perpetuo	def.	Wilians Santos	Decision (Unanimous)	3	5:00
	Bruno Cappelozza	def.	Marcelo Cruz	TKO (Leg Kicks and Punches)	3	1:53
	Norman Carlton	def.	Peterson Almeida Vilela	TKO (Punches)	2	0:50

== Jungle Fight 27 ==
Jungle Fight 27 was an event held on April 21, 2011 at Nilson Nelson Gymnasium in Brasília, Brazil.

=== Results ===
Main Card
Weight class				Method	Round	Time	Notes
	Adriano Martins	def.	Ronildo Augusto Braga	TKO (Punches)	1	2:54
	Edilberto de Oliveira	def.	Nielsen Nunes	TKO (Punches)	2	3:12
	Marcos Antonio Santana	def.	Vicente Luque	Decision (Unanimous)	3	5:00
	John Lineker	def.	Renato Velame	Submission (Rear-Naked Choke)	1	2:58
	Rafael Miranda	def.	Fabiano Silva da Conceicao	Decision (Unanimous)	3	5:00
	Ismael de Jesus	def.	Leonardo Guimaraes	Decision (Unanimous)	3	5:00
	Rivanio Regiz	def.	Leo Pinheiro	Submission (Guillotine Choke)	3	1:03

== Jungle Fight 28 ==
Jungle Fight 28 was an event held on May 21, 2011 at Flamengo Rowing Club Gymnasium in Rio de Janeiro, Brazil.

=== Results ===
Main Card
Weight class				Method	Round	Time	Notes
	Francisco Trinaldo	def.	Derrick Burnsed	KO (Punch)	2	0:54
	Marcelo Guimaraes	def.	Ildemar Alcantara	Decision (Unanimous)	3	5:00
	John Lineker	def.	Luiz Carlos Alves Neves	KO (Punch)	1	1:18
	Iliarde Santos	def.	Armando Gomes da Silva	TKO (Doctor Stoppage)	2	2:30
	Bruno Cappelozza	def.	Jackson Mora	KO (Punches)	1	4:28
	Douglas Moura	def.	Silvio Jose da Silva	Submission (Rear-Naked Choke)	2	0:36
	William Baldutti	def.	Leonardo Alves Nascimento	Decision (Unanimous)	3	5:00

== Jungle Fight 29 ==
Jungle Fight 29 was an event held on June 25, 2011 at Hércules Antônio Pereira Miranda Gymnasium in Serra, Brazil.

=== Results ===
Main Card
Weight class				Method	Round	Time	Notes
	Renato Moicano	def.	Iliarde Santos	Decision (Unanimous)	3	5:00
	Neilson Gomes	def.	Julio Cesar de Almeida	TKO (Punches)	1	5:00
	Ednaldo Oliveira	vs.	Luis Guilherme de Andrade	No Contest (Eye Poke)	1	0:00
	Wilians Santos	def.	Emiliano Sordi	Decision (Unanimous)	3	5:00
	Gabriel Moraes Moreira	def.	Magno Alexandre	KO (Punches)	1	0:36
	Gilmar de Andrade	def.	Claudinei de Souza	TKO (Retirement)	1	5:00
	Douglas Bertazini	def.	Cleiton Baptista Prisco	TKO (Retirement)	1	5:00

== Jungle Fight 30 ==
Jungle Fight 30 was an event held on July 30, 2011 at Pará State University Gymnasium in Belém, Brazil.

=== Results ===
Main Card
Weight class				Method	Round	Time	Notes
	Francisco Trinaldo	def.	Adriano Martins	Decision (Majority)	3	5:00
	Iliarde Santos	def.	Luciano Aparecido Lopes	TKO (Punches)	1	2:03
	Ednaldo Oliveira	def.	Ubiratan Marinho Lima	Decision (Unanimous)	3	5:00
	Ildemar Alcantara	def.	Richard Smith	Submission (Rear-Naked Choke)	1	2:39
	Paulo Henrique	def.	Norman Carlton	KO (Punch)	1	1:27
	John Lineker	def.	Francisco Figueiredo	TKO (Punches)	3	0:36
	Neilson Gomes	def.	Jadison Dimitry Silva da Costa	Decision (Unanimous)	3	5:00

== Jungle Fight 31 ==
Jungle Fight 31 was an event held on August 20, 2011 at Prudente de Moraes Gymnasium in Itu, Brazil.

=== Results ===
Main Card
Weight class				Method	Round	Time	Notes
	Marcelo Guimaraes	def.	Lucas Rodolfo Bresolin Rota	Technical Submission (Rear-Naked Choke)	2	3:07
	Kleber Raimundo Silva	def.	Edson Franca	Decision (Unanimous)	3	5:00
	Gil de Freitas	def.	Marinho Moreira da Rocha	TKO (Punches)	2	0:37
	Douglas Bertazini	def.	Joni Eduardo	Decision (Unanimous)	3	5:00
	Diego Arturo Huerto Jauregui	def.	Fernando Kioshi	Decision (Split)	3	5:00
	Joao Paulo Pereira	def.	Marcelo Cruz	Submission (Rear-Naked Choke)	1	3:37

== Jungle Fight 32 ==
Jungle Fight 32 was an event held on September 10, 2011 at Ibirapuera Gymnasium in São Paulo, Brazil.

=== Results ===
Main Card
Weight class				Method	Round	Time	Notes
	John Lineker	def.	Iliarde Santos	Decision (Split)	3	5:00
	Neilson Gomes	def.	Jeremy Umphries	Submission (Rear-Naked Choke)	1	2:15
	Charles Michael Souza	def.	Paulo Henrique	TKO (Punches)	1	0:07
	Wendell de Oliveira Marques	def.	Tiago Passos	KO (Punch)	2	3:36
	Bruno Cappelozza	def.	Dirlei Broenstrup	TKO (Retirement)	3	2:46
	Douglas Moura	def.	Joao Paulo de Carvalho	Submission (Armbar)	1	3:54

== Jungle Fight 33 ==
Jungle Fight 33 was an event held on October 21, 2011 at Cidade de Deus (Rio de Janeiro) in Rio de Janeiro, Brazil.

=== Results ===
Main Card
Weight class				Method	Round	Time	Notes
	Alexandre Pimentel	def.	Udi Lima	TKO (Knee to the Body)	1	4:40
	Iliarde Santos	vs.	Eduardo Felipe	NC (Accidental Knee to Downed Felipe)	2	0:00
	Rafael Miranda	def.	Peter Simone	Submission (Anaconda Choke)	1	1:42
	Neilson Gomes	def.	Elieni Silva	KO (Punch)	1	3:34
	Ildemar Alcantara	def.	Wilians Santos	TKO (Doctor Stoppage)	1	2:04
	Fabiano Fernandes	def.	Atila Lourenco	TKO (Punches)	2	2:51
	Leandro Souza	def.	Evandro Fernando Silva	Submission (Heel Hook)	1	0:00

== Jungle Fight 34 ==
Jungle Fight 34 was an event held on November 26, 2011 at Block of Mangueira in Rio de Janeiro, Brazil.

=== Results ===
Main Card
Weight class				Method	Round	Time	Notes
	Adriano Martins	def.	Neilson Gomes	TKO (Punches)	1	1:21
	Carlos Alberto Bazan Rojas	def.	Lucas Rodolfo Bresolin Rota	Submission (Rear-Naked Choke)	1	1:13
	Diego Arturo Huerto Jauregui	def.	Francisco Cylderlan Lima da Silva	TKO (Punches)	3	4:31
	Marcus Vinicius Sa Freire	def.	Mauricio Rossi	TKO (Punches)	1	0:36
	Ary Santos	def.	Douglas Bertazini	Submission (Triangle Choke)	1	1:13
	Sidney Lessa de Oliveira	def.	Reynaldo Walter Duarte	Decision (Unanimous)	3	5:00
	Rodolfo Buda	def.	Cleiton Ramos	Submission (Rear-Naked Choke)	1	3:07
	Vitor Riso	def.	Rogerio Franca	Submission (Armbar)	1	3:28

== Jungle Fight 35 ==
Jungle Fight 35 was an event held on December 17, 2011 at Pacaembu Gymnasium in São Paulo, Brazil.

=== Results ===
Main Card
Weight class				Method	Round	Time	Notes
	Kleber Raimundo Silva	def.	Joao Paulo Pereira	KO (Punches)	2	4:23
	Emiliano Sordi	def.	Bruno Cappelozza	Submission (Guillotine Choke)	1	0:34
	Ildemar Alcantara	def.	Geovane Francisco	TKO (Knee and Punches)	1	2:14
	Edson Franca	def.	Tiago Thor	TKO (Punches)	1	4:22
	Diogo Cavalcanti	def.	Janio Carvalho dos Santos	TKO (Punches)	1	3:05
	Tiago Passos	def.	Rodrigo Ruiz	Submission (Heel Hook)	1	2:05
	Ricardo Maciel	def.	Maykon Costa	Submission (Armbar)	1	2:43
