= Iliarde Santos =

Brazilian mixed martial arts fighter

- Born: September 25, 1980 (age 46); Belém, Pará, Brazil
- Height: 5 ft 5 in (1.65 m)
- Weight: 124.9 lb (56.7 kg; 8.92 st)
- Division: Flyweight; Bantamweight; Featherweight; Lightweight
- Reach: 67.0 in (170 cm)
- Fighting out of: Belém, Pará, Brazil
- Team: Ulysses Pereira Team
- Rank: 2nd degree black belt in Brazilian Jiu-Jitsu
- Years active: 2006–present

Mixed martial arts record
- Total: 49
- Wins: 32
- By knockout: 14
- By submission: 7
- By decision: 11
- Losses: 15
- By knockout: 5
- By decision: 10
- Draws: 1
- No contests: 1

Other information
- Mixed martial arts record from Sherdog

Iliarde Santos (born September 25, 1980) is a Brazilian mixed martial artist currently competing in the Flyweight division. A professional competitor since 2006, he has competed for the UFC, Titan FC, and Jungle Fight.

== Mixed martial arts career ==
=== Early career ===
Santos started his professional career in 2006. Until 2011, he fought mainly for local promotions in Northern Brazil.

=== Jungle Fight ===
Santos obtained two victories and one loss in the organization before a bantamweight title eliminator match against Luciano Aparecido on July 30, 2011, at Jungle Fight 30, in which he won via TKO in the very first round.

Santos next faced John Lineker on October 22, 2011, at Jungle Fight 32 for the Jungle Fight bantamweight title. He lost via split decision.

=== Iron Fight Combat title and UFC contract ===
Santos faced Alan Barros on September 1, 2012, at Iron Fight Combat 1 for the Iron Fight Combat bantamweight title. He won via TKO in round one.

In 2012, Santos has amassed a total of six victories, including a victory over Leandro Higo, and in 2013 he signed with the UFC.

=== Ultimate Fighting Championship ===
Santos made his promotional debut replacing an injured Marcos Vinicius against Iuri Alcântara on May 18, 2013, at UFC on FX: Belfort vs. Rockhold. He lost via TKO in the first round.

Santos next moved down to flyweight and faced Ian McCall on August 3, 2013, at UFC 163. He lost via unanimous decision (30-27, 30-27, 29-28), and the performance earned both participants Fight of the Night honors.

Santos next faced Chris Cariaso on October 9, 2013, at UFC Fight Night: Maia vs. Shields. He lost the fight via TKO in the second round and was subsequently released from the promotion following the loss.

=== Titan Fighting Championship ===
In January 2014, Santos signed with Titan Fighting Championship. Santos is expected to take on fellow UFC veteran Jeff Curran in April.

== Championships and accomplishments ==
=== Mixed martial arts ===
- Ultimate Fighting Championship
  - Fight of the Night (one time) vs. Ian McCall
- Iron Fight Combat
  - Iron Fight Combat bantamweight title (one time)

== Mixed martial arts record ==
Professional record breakdown
| 49 matches | 32 wins | 15 losses |
| By knockout | 14 | 5 |
| By submission | 7 | 0 |
| By decision | 11 | 10 |
| Draws | 1 | |
| No contests | 1 | |

| Res. | Record | Opponent | Method | Event | Date | Round | Time | Location | Notes |
|---|---|---|---|---|---|---|---|---|---|
| Win | 32–14–1 (1) | Eder Sampaio Meneses | TKO (punches) | Arena Fight 8 - In Memory of Meire Cabral | May 12, 2018 | 2 | 3:50 | Redenção, Pará, Brazil | |
| Loss | 31–14–1 (1) | Raulian Paiva Frazao | KO (punches) | SMF - Salvaterra Marajo Fight 7 | November 30, 2017 | 1 | 0:58 | Salvaterra, Pará, Brazil | |
| Loss | 31–13–1 (1) | Pedro Falcao | Decision (unanimous) | Shooto Brazil - Shooto Brazil 74 | August 27, 2017 | 3 | 5:00 | Rio de Janeiro, Brazil | |
| Win | 31–12–1 (1) | Rafael de Abreu | TKO (punches) | Aspera FC 55 - Aspera Fighting Championship 55 | August 12, 2017 | 1 | 4:14 | Maringá, Brazil | |
| Loss | 30–12–1 (1) | Cleverson Silva | Decision (unanimous) | Mr. Cage Championship - Mr. Cage 27 | May 27, 2017 | 5 | 5:00 | Coari, Brazil | |
| Loss | 30–12–1 (1) | Johnatha Guido dos Santos Silveira | Decision (unanimous) | Thunder Fight 10 - Guido vs. Iliarde | December 17, 2016 | 3 | 5:00 | São Paulo, Brazil | |
| Win | 30–11–1 (1) | Bruno Viana | Decision (split) | AFC - Aspera Fighting Championship 35 | April 23, 2016 | 3 | 5:00 | Ji-Paraná, Brazil | |
| Loss | 29–11–1 (1) | Rafael Dias | Decision (split) | MC - Mr. Cage 21 | February 13, 2016 | 3 | 5:00 | Manaus, Brazil | |
| Win | 29–10–1 (1) | Giliarde Silva | Submission (arm-triangle choke) | MC - Mr. Cage 20 | December 15, 2015 | 3 | 4:30 | Manaus, Brazil | |
| Loss | 28–10–1 (1) | Tim Elliott | Decision (unanimous) | Titan FC 34 | July 18, 2015 | 5 | 5:00 | Kansas City, Missouri, United States | For the inaugural Titan FC Flyweight Championship. |
| Win | 28–9–1 (1) | Nick Honstein | Decision (unanimous) | Titan FC 32 | December 19, 2014 | 3 | 5:00 | Lowell, Massachusetts, United States | |
| Loss | 27–9–1 (1) | Chris Cariaso | TKO (punches) | UFC Fight Night: Maia vs. Shields | October 9, 2013 | 2 | 4:31 | Barueri, São Paulo, Brazil | |
| Loss | 27–8–1 (1) | Ian McCall | Decision (unanimous) | UFC 163 | August 3, 2013 | 3 | 5:00 | Rio de Janeiro, Brazil | Moved down to Flyweight. Fight of the night. |
| Loss | 27–7–1 (1) | Iuri Alcântara | KO (punches) | UFC on FX: Belfort vs. Rockhold | May 18, 2013 | 1 | 2:31 | Jaraguá do Sul, Santa Catarina, Brazil | |
| Win | 27–6–1 (1) | Maycon Silvan | Decision (unanimous) | Best of the Best: Pará vs. Brazil | November 29, 2012 | 3 | 5:00 | Belém, Pará, Brazil | |
| Win | 26–6–1 (1) | Alan Barros | TKO (punches) | Iron Fight Combat 1 | September 1, 2012 | 1 | 1:04 | Feira de Santana, Bahia, Brazil | Won Iron Fight Combat Bantamweight Championship. |
| Win | 25–6–1 (1) | Leandro Higo | Decision (unanimous) | Jungle Fight 38 | April 28, 2012 | 3 | 5:00 | Belém, Pará, Brazil | |
| Win | 24–6–1 (1) | Emiliano Vatti | Submission (kimura) | Iron Man Championship 14 | April 5, 2012 | 1 | N/A | Belém, Pará, Brazil | |
| Win | 23–6–1 (1) | Jose Delgadillo | TKO (punches) | Amazon Fight 15 | March 22, 2012 | 1 | 1:57 | Belém, Pará, Brazil | |
| Win | 22–6–1 (1) | Daniel Lima de Carvalho | TKO (punches) | Iron Man Championship 13 | January 12, 2012 | 1 | 1:57 | Belém, Pará, Brazil | |
| NC | 21–6–1 (1) | Eduardo Felipe | NC (accidental knee to downed Felipe) | Jungle Fight 33 | October 22, 2011 | 2 | N/A | Rio de Janeiro, Brazil | |
| Loss | 21–6–1 | John Lineker | Decision (split) | Jungle Fight 32 | September 10, 2011 | 3 | 5:00 | São Paulo, Brazil | For Jungle Fight Bantamweight Championship. |
| Win | 21–5–1 | Luciano Aparecido | TKO (punches) | Jungle Fight 30 | July 30, 2011 | 1 | 2:03 | Belém, Pará, Brazil | |
| Loss | 20–5–1 | Renato Moicano | Decision (unanimous) | Jungle Fight 29 | June 25, 2011 | 3 | 5:00 | Serra, Espírito Santo, Brazil | |
| Win | 20–4–1 | Armando Gomes | TKO (doctor stoppage) | Jungle Fight 28 | May 21, 2011 | 2 | 2:30 | Rio de Janeiro, Brazil | |
| Win | 19–4–1 | Antenor Pereira | Submission (heel hook) | Jungle Fight 26 | April 2, 2011 | 1 | 1:10 | São Paulo, Brazil | |
| Win | 18–4–1 | Eder da Silva | TKO (punches) | Colisão Fighting Championship 2 | February 4, 2011 | 1 | N/A | Marituba, Pará, Brazil | |
| Win | 17–4–1 | Renato Gomes | TKO (punches) | Iron Man Championship 8 | December 16, 2010 | 2 | N/A | Belém, Pará, Brazil | |
| Win | 16–4–1 | Paulo Dinis | Submission (armbar) | Gladiators Fighting Championship 2 | October 16, 2010 | 2 | 4:35 | Curitiba, Paraná, Brazil | |
| Win | 15–4–1 | Guilherme Matos | Decision (unanimous) | Iron Man Championship 7 | October 7, 2010 | 3 | 5:00 | Belém, Pará, Brazil | |
| Win | 14–4–1 | Fabio da Rocha | Decision (unanimous) | Iron Man Championship: Extreme | August 12, 2010 | 3 | 5:00 | Belém, Pará, Brazil | |
| Loss | 13–4–1 | Guilherme Matos | KO (punch) | Iron Man Championship 6 | June 10, 2010 | 2 | 3:22 | Belém, Pará, Brazil | |
| Win | 13–3–1 | Nelson Velasques | Submission (rear-naked choke) | GFSP: Gladiador Fight | May 15, 2010 | 1 | N/A | Araçatuba, São Paulo, Brazil | |
| Win | 12–3–1 | Marcio Cesar | TKO (punches) | Power Fight Extreme 2 | March 13, 2010 | 2 | 1:20 | Curitiba, Paraná, Brazil | |
| Loss | 11–3–1 | Genair da Silva | TKO (punches) | Nitrix: Show Fight 4 | February 6, 2010 | 1 | 2:32 | Balneário Camboriú, Santa Catarina, Brazil | |
| Win | 11–2–1 | Gilmar Dutra | TKO (punches) | Samurai FC 2: Warrior's Return | December 12, 2009 | 1 | 0:23 | Curitiba, Paraná, Brazil | |
| Win | 10–2–1 | Adriano Silva | TKO (punches) | Iron Man Championship 4 | November 20, 2009 | 1 | 4:00 | Belém, Pará, Brazil | |
| Win | 9–2–1 | Diego Battaglia | TKO (punches) | Full Heroes Battle 1 | November 7, 2009 | 3 | 2:44 | Paranaguá, Paraná, Brazil | |
| Win | 8–2–1 | Geovani de Lima | Submission (heel hook) | Full Heroes Battle 1 | November 7, 2009 | 1 | 2:04 | Paranaguá, Paraná, Brazil | |
| Loss | 7–2–1 | Marcos Rodrigues | Decision (split) | Real Fight 7 | October 3, 2009 | 3 | 5:00 | São José dos Campos, São Paulo, Brazil | |
| Win | 7–1–1 | Rogerio de Souza | Decision (split) | Iron Man Vale Tudo 16 | July 5, 2009 | 3 | 5:00 | Macapá, Amapá, Brazil | |
| Loss | 6–1–1 | Diego Braga | Decision (split) | Imperio Fight | May 7, 2009 | 3 | 5:00 | Belém, Pará, Brazil | |
| Win | 6–0–1 | Rivanio Regiz | Decision (unanimous) | Iron Man Championship: Champions | April 19, 2009 | 3 | 5:00 | Belém, Pará, Brazil | |
| Win | 5–0–1 | Rafael Addario | Decision (unanimous) | Iron Man Championship 1 | November 13, 2008 | 3 | 5:00 | Belém, Pará, Brazil | |
| Win | 4–0–1 | Michel Addario | Submission (kneebar) | Midway Fight | June 26, 2008 | 1 | N/A | Belém, Pará, Brazil | |
| Draw | 3–0–1 | Adson Lira | Draw | Desafio de Gigantes 9 | August 18, 2007 | 3 | 5:00 | Macapá, Amapá, Brazil | |
| Win | 3–0 | Bruno Dantas | TKO (punches) | Mega Champion Fight 2 | August 18, 2007 | 3 | 1:46 | Manaus, Amazonas, Brazil | |
| Win | 2–0 | Alexandre Alcântara | Decision (unanimous) | Nutripower Fighting Championship | August 18, 2007 | 3 | 5:00 | Belém, Pará, Brazil | |
| Win | 1–0 | Glauco Correa | Decision (unanimous) | Midway Fight | June 29, 2006 | 3 | 5:00 | Belém, Pará, Brazil | |
