= UFC Fight Night: Teixeira vs. Bader =

UFC mixed martial arts event in 2013

- The poster for UFC Fight Night: Teixeira vs. Bader
- Promotion: Ultimate Fighting Championship
- Date: September 4, 2013
- Venue: Mineirinho Arena
- City: Belo Horizonte, Brazil
- Attendance: 5,126

Event chronology
UFC 164: Henderson vs. Pettis 2	UFC Fight Night: Teixeira vs. Bader	UFC 165: Jones vs. Gustafsson

UFC Fight Night: Teixeira vs. Bader (also known as UFC Fight Night 28) was a mixed martial arts that was held on September 4, 2013, at Mineirinho Arena in Belo Horizonte, Brazil.

== Background ==
A bout between Raphael Assunção and T.J. Dillashaw was briefly linked to this event. However, the pairing was delayed and would take place at a later event this year due to a minor medical issue for Assunção.

Godofredo Pepey was expected to face Sam Sicilia at the event. However, Pepey pulled out of the bout citing an injury and was replaced by Felipe Arantes. Then, on August 7, Sicilia also pulled out and was replaced by promotional newcomer Kevin Souza, the former Jungle Fight featherweight champion.

Kenny Robertson was expected to face João Zeferino at this event. However, Robertson pulled out of the bout citing an injury and was replaced by UFC promotional newcomer Elias Silvério, the former Jungle Fight welterweight champion.

Johnny Bedford was expected to face Hugo Viana at this event. However, Bedford pulled out of the bout citing an injury. Viana was then briefly scheduled to face UFC newcomer Wilson Reis. Then just days before the event, Viana also pulled out of the bout citing an injury and the bout was cancelled.

Marcelo Guimarães was expected to face Keith Wisniewski at this event. However, Guimarães pulled out of the bout citing an injury and was replaced by UFC promotional newcomer Ivan Jorge, the former Jungle Fight lightweight champion.

== Results ==
Main Card (Fox Sports 1)
Weight class				Method	Round	Time	Notes
Light Heavyweight	Glover Teixeira	def.	Ryan Bader	TKO (punches)	1	2:55
Middleweight	Ronaldo Souza	def.	Yushin Okami	TKO (punches)	1	2:47
Flyweight	Joseph Benavidez	def.	Jussier Formiga	TKO (knee to the body and punches)	1	3:07
Lightweight	Piotr Hallmann	def.	Francisco Trinaldo	Submission (kimura)	2	3:50
Middleweight	Rafael Natal	def.	Tor Troéng	Decision (unanimous) (30–27, 30–27, 29–28)	3	5:00
Flyweight	Ali Bagautinov	def.	Marcos Vinicius	TKO (punches)	3	3:28
Preliminary card (Fox Sports 1)
Featherweight	Kevin Souza	def.	Felipe Arantes	Decision (split) (29–28, 28–29, 29–28)	3	5:00
Bantamweight	Lucas Martins	def.	Junior Hernandez	Technical Submission (rear-naked choke)	1	1:10
Welterweight	Elias Silvério	def.	João Zeferino	Decision (unanimous) (29–28, 30–27, 30–27)	3	5:00
Welterweight	Ivan Jorge	def.	Keith Wisniewski	Decision (unanimous) (29–28, 30–27, 29–28)	3	5:00
Preliminary card (Facebook/YouTube)
Welterweight	Sean Spencer	def.	Yuri Villefort	Decision (split) (30–27, 28–29, 29–28)	3	5:00

== Bonus awards ==
The following fighters received $50,000 bonuses.

- Fight of the Night: Rafael Natal vs. Tor Troeng
- Knockout of the Night: Glover Teixeira
- Submission of the Night: Piotr Hallmann

== See also ==
- List of UFC events
- 2013 in UFC
