= Mixed martial arts in Brazil =

- Country: Brazil
- Governing body: The Comissao Atletica Brasileira de MMA (CABMMA)
- National team: Brazil

Mixed martial arts in Brazil is the second most popular sport after football, but historically the most popular combat sport. Brazil is seen as a pioneer of modern MMA worldwide, and many Brazilian fans credit the country as the creator of the discipline.

The country has produced numerous fighters who have won world championships abroad, such as in PRIDE Fighting Championships, M-1 Global, the Ultimate Fighting Championship, Bellator MMA, ONE Championship, and LUX Fight League. In the UFC, Brazilians have the most foreign champions (a total of 22 fighters).

== History ==
An early form of modern mixed martial arts in Brazil was vale tudo, a combat style dating back to the 1920s in which athletes could use any technique from martial arts or different combat sports, since, as the name indicated, anything went. The term was even used as a synonym for MMA in the country, but fell out of use due to the emergence of stricter rules and the influence of the media in giving it a more "civilized" name. Currently, it is used to refer to an early, more rule-free stage of modern sport.

Much of Brazil's popularity and status as a powerhouse in this sport is due to the Gracie family. On October 23, 1951, patriarch Hélio Gracie faced Japanese fighter Masahiko Kimura in a bout that, while not for a championship, pitted a pioneer of Brazilian jiu-jitsu against a judo master. The result was a victory for Kimura by towel and was considered one of the earliest innovations in mixed martial arts.

== Organizations ==
Jungle Fight is a Brazilian MMA and kickboxing promotion, and has been considered the most important in South America, as many of its fighters have jumped to major foreign promotions. Previously there was International Vale Tudo Championship, which was active between 1997 and 2003 with a brief return in the late 2010s, when the company finally closed.

The Brazilian MMA Athletic Commission, or Comissao Atletica Brasileira de MMA (CABMMA), represents state federations across Brazil and is spearheaded by lawyers Giovanni Biscardi and Rafael Favettia, a former Executive Secretary of the Minister of Justice and Interim Minister of Justice.

== Broadcasters ==
The UFC is the most widely watched MMA organization and is broadcast on Globo. Jungle Fight is a popular domestic Brazilian MMA organization.
