= Ildemar Alcântara =

Brazilian mixed martial arts fighter

- Born: 17 November 1982 (age 43); Soure, Pará, Brazil
- Other names: Marajó
- Height: 6 ft 2 in (1.88 m)
- Weight: 185.2 lb (84.0 kg; 13.23 st)
- Division: Heavyweight; Light Heavyweight; Middleweight; Welterweight
- Reach: 78 in (198 cm)
- Fighting out of: Soure, Pará, Brazil
- Team: Frankiko Team; Marajo Brothers Team
- Rank: Black belt in Brazilian Jiu-Jitsu
- Years active: 2005–present

Mixed martial arts record
- Total: 44
- Wins: 26
- By knockout: 11
- By submission: 9
- By decision: 6
- Losses: 18
- By knockout: 8
- By submission: 1
- By decision: 9

Other information
- Notable relatives: Iuri Alcântara (brother)
- Mixed martial arts record from Sherdog

Ildemar Alcântara (Portuguese pronunciation: [iwdeˈmaʁ awˈkɐ̃taɾɐ]; born 7 November 1982) is a Brazilian mixed martial artist currently competing in the light heavyweight division. A professional competitor since 2005, he has formerly competed in the UFC and is the younger brother of former UFC fighter Iuri Alcântara.

== Mixed martial arts career ==
=== Jungle Fight ===
With the departure of Marcelo Guimarães, who was champion of the middleweight division in Jungle Fight, the organization decided to hold a tournament to crown a new champion. He fought against Eder Baiano Jones. Alcântara won via split decision and advanced in the tournament, then faced Ederson Cristian Macedo and won via armbar submission. At Jungle Fight 47, he was crowned champion by defeating Itamar Rosa winning via TKO.

=== Ultimate Fighting Championship ===
Alcântara made his UFC debut replacing Roger Hollett to face Wagner Prado in a light heavyweight bout on 19 January 2013 at UFC on FX: Belfort vs. Bisping. He won the bout via kneebar submission in the second round and earned Submission of the Night honors.

Alcântara was expected to make his welterweight debut against Jason High at UFC on Fuel TV 10. However, High was pulled from the bout in late April in favor of a matchup on the same card against Erick Silva after Silva's original opponent was scratched from the event. Alcântara instead faced promotional newcomer Leandro Silva. He won the fight via unanimous decision.

Alcântara faced promotional newcomer Igor Araújo on 9 October 2013 at UFC Fight Night 29. Araújo defeated Alcântara via unanimous decision.

Alcântara faced promotional newcomer Albert Tumenov on 15 February 2014 at UFC Fight Night 36. He won the fight via split decision.

Alcântara was expected to face Santiago Ponzinibbio on 5 July 2014 at UFC 175. However, Ponzinibbio pulled out of the bout citing a knee injury and was replaced by Kenny Robertson. Alcântara lost the fight via unanimous decision.

Alcântara moved back up to middleweight to face Richardson Moreira on 31 January 2014 at UFC 183. He won the fight by split decision.

Alcântara faced Kevin Casey on 15 July 2015 at UFC Fight Night 71. He lost the fight by unanimous decision, and was subsequently released from the promotion.

== Championships and accomplishments ==
- Jungle Fight
  - Jungle Fight Middleweight Championship (One time)
- Ultimate Fighting Championship
  - Submission of the Night (One time) vs. Wagner Prado

== Mixed martial arts record ==
Professional record breakdown
44 matches	26 wins	18 losses
By knockout	11	8
By submission	9	1
By decision	6	9

Res.	Record	Opponent	Method	Event	Date	Round	Time	Location	Notes
Loss	26–18	Oumar Sy	TKO (punches)	KOF 1	30 June 2023	1	1:21	Cesson-Sévigné, France	Heavyweight bout.
Loss	26–17	Oleg Dadonov	TKO (punches)	Hardcore MMA 51	19 January 2023	1	3:26	Moscow, Russia	For the Hardcore MMA Middleweight Championship.
Loss	26–16	Viktor Pešta	TKO (punches)	Oktagon 20	30 December 2020	1	4:06	Brno, Czech Republic	
Loss	26–15	Jailton Almeida	Submission (arm-triangle choke)	Thunder Fight 23	11 October 2020	1	4:49	São Bernardo do Campo, Brazil	
Loss	26–14	Laurynas Urbonavicius	Decision (unanimous)	ARES FC 1	14 December 2019	3	5:00	Dakar, Senegal	
Win	26–13	Tyago Costa	Submission (triangle choke)	South America Fighters Combat 1: Marajo vs. Borges	16 December 2018	1	1:10	Pará, Brazil	
Win	25–13	Maico Machado	Submission (north-south choke)	Super Fight Brazil 1	10 November 2018	2	1:24	Piauí, Brazil	
Win	24–13	Divino Gontijo	TKO (punches)	Champions Fight Combat 14	8 September 2018	1	0:17	Maranhão, Brazil	
Win	23–13	Normando Cabral de Andrade	Submission (anaconda choke)	World Kombat Challenge 48: WKC Apu Thai 2	4 August 2018	1	0:40	Castanhal, Brazil	
Loss	22–13	Magomed Ismailov	TKO (punches)	Fight Nights Global 85: Alikhanov vs. Kopylov	30 March 2018	1	3:41	Moscow, Russia	
Win	22–12	Artur Alibulatov	Decision (split)	ProFC 64: Tibilov vs. Shvets	24 December 2017	3	5:00	Rostov-on-Don, Russia	
Loss	21–12	Alexey Efremov	TKO (elbows)	World Fighting Championship Akhmat 42	27 September 2017	3	0:19	Moscow, Russia	
Loss	21–11	Beslan Ushukov	Decision (majority)	World Fighting Championship Akhmat 38	21 May 2017	3	5:00	Grozny, Chechnya, Russia	
Loss	21–10	Markus Perez Echeimberg	Decision (unanimous)	Arzalet Fighting Globe Championship	10 February 2017	3	5:00	São Paulo, Brazil	
Loss	21–9	Henrique da Silva	TKO (punches)	The King of Jungle Championship 2	14 January 2016	2	4:55	Belém, Brazil	Light Heavyweight bout.
Loss	21–8	Kevin Casey	Decision (unanimous)	UFC Fight Night: Mir vs. Duffee	15 July 2015	3	5:00	San Diego, California, United States	
Win	21–7	Richardson Moreira	Decision (split)	UFC 183	31 January 2015	3	5:00	Las Vegas, Nevada, United States	Return to Middleweight.
Loss	20–7	Kenny Robertson	Decision (unanimous)	UFC 175	5 July 2014	3	5:00	Las Vegas, Nevada, United States	
Win	20–6	Albert Tumenov	Decision (split)	UFC Fight Night: Machida vs. Mousasi	15 February 2014	3	5:00	Jaraguá do Sul, Brazil	
Loss	19–6	Igor Araújo	Decision (unanimous)	UFC Fight Night: Maia vs. Shields	9 October 2013	3	5:00	Barueri, Brazil	
Win	19–5	Leandro Silva	Decision (unanimous)	UFC on Fuel TV: Nogueira vs. Werdum	8 June 2013	3	5:00	Fortaleza, Brazil	Welterweight debut.
Win	18–5	Wagner Prado	Submission (kneebar)	UFC on FX: Belfort vs. Bisping	19 January 2013	2	2:39	São Paulo, Brazil	Light Heavyweight bout; Submission of the Night
Win	17–5	Itamar Rosa	TKO (punches)	Jungle Fight 47: Jungle Belt	21 December 2012	1	1:07	Porto Alegre, Brazil	Won Jungle Fight Grand Prix, became Jungle Fight Middleweight Champion.
Win	16–5	Ederson Cristian	Submission (armbar)	Jungle Fight 44	27 October 2012	1	1:32	Rio de Janeiro, Brazil	Jungle Fight Grand Prix Second Round.
Win	15–5	Eder Jones	Decision (split)	Jungle Fight 41	28 July 2012	3	5:00	São Paulo, Brazil	Jungle Fight Grand Prix Opening Round.
Win	14–5	Edilberto de Oliveira	KO (punches)	Jungle Fight 38	28 April 2012	1	3:02	Belém, Brazil	
Win	13–5	Geovane Francisco	TKO (knee and punches)	Jungle Fight 35	17 December 2011	1	2:14	Rio de Janeiro, Brazil	
Win	12–5	Willians Santos	TKO (doctor stoppage)	Jungle Fight 33	22 October 2011	1	2:04	Rio de Janeiro, Brazil	
Win	11–5	Richard Smith	Submission (rear naked choke)	Jungle Fight 30	30 July 2011	1	2:39	Belém, Brazil	
Loss	10–5	Marcelo Guimarães	Decision (unanimous)	Jungle Fight 28	21 May 2011	3	5:00	Rio de Janeiro, Brazil	
Win	10–4	Jackson Mora	TKO (punches)	Jungle Fight 24	18 December 2010	1	4:37	Rio de Janeiro, Brazil	
Win	9–4	Jacob Quintana	TKO (knee to the body)	Jungle Fight 23	30 October 2010	1	1:23	Belém, Brazil	
Win	8–4	Potcho Potcho	TKO (punches)	Iron Man Championship 7	7 October 2010	2	2:15	Belém, Brazil	
Win	7–4	Antonio Mendes	Decision (unanimous)	Amazon Fight 4	13 August 2010	3	5:00	Belém, Brazil	
Loss	6–4	Bruno Silva	TKO (leg kick)	Iron Man Championship 4	20 November 2009	2	0:40	Belém, Brazil	
Win	6–3	Rogério Gama	TKO (punches)	Belem Open Fight 2	17 September 2009	1	3:11	Belém, Brazil	
Win	5–3	Beto Silva	KO (punches)	Super Fight	23 July 2009	2	3:17	São Luís, Brazil	
Loss	4–3	Geronimo dos Santos	TKO (punches)	Hiro Belém	21 April 2009	2	N/A	Belém, Brazil	Heavyweight bout.
Win	4–2	Brian Maulany	Submission (armbar)	Cage Fight Event: Rumble in the Jungle	21 December 2008	1	2:28	Paramaribo, Suriname	
Win	3–2	Junior Sumo	TKO (punches)	Round Fight 2	25 September 2008	1	2:20	Belém, Brazil	
Win	2–2	Maurilio de Souza	Submission (kneebar)	Ceará Vale Tudo Meeting	18 April 2007	3	2:31	Fortaleza, Brazil	Middleweight debut.
Loss	1–2	Fábio Maldonado	Decision (unanimous)	Predador FC 4: Kamae	25 January 2007	3	5:00	Brazil	
Loss	1–1	Luís Santos	Decision (unanimous)	Mega Combat Vale Tudo	1 October 2005	3	5:00	Belém, Brazil	
Win	1–0	Luís Santos	Submission (triangle choke)	Iron Man Vale Tudo 7	11 June 2005	2	4:51	Macapa, Brazil	

== See also ==
- List of current UFC fighters
- List of male mixed martial artists
