= Ivan Jorge =

Brazilian mixed martial artist

- Born: November 7, 1980 (age 45); Florianópolis, Brazil
- Height: 5 ft 10 in (1.78 m)
- Weight: 170 lb (77 kg; 12 st)
- Division: Middleweight; Welterweight; Lightweight
- Reach: 74 in (190 cm)
- Fighting out of: Florianópolis, Brazil
- Team: Team Tavares
- Rank: Black belt in Brazilian Jiu-Jitsu; Black belt in Luta Livre Esportiva
- Years active: 2001–present

Mixed martial arts record
- Total: 35
- Wins: 27
- By knockout: 3
- By submission: 13
- By decision: 11
- Losses: 8
- By knockout: 5
- By submission: 1
- By decision: 2

Other information
- Mixed martial arts record from Sherdog

Ivan Jorge (born November 7, 1980) is a Brazilian mixed martial artist currently competing in the Welterweight division. A professional competitor since 2001, he has competed for the UFC, Fight Nights Global, Jungle Fight and M-1 Global. He is the former Jungle Fight Lightweight Champion.

== Mixed martial arts career ==
=== Early career ===
Jorge made his professional mixed martial arts debut in June 2001. During the first 11 years of his career he fought in his native Brazil, Russia, and Spain for a variety of promotions. He amassed a record of 18–3.

=== Jungle Fight ===
Jorge debuted for the Jungle Fight promotion early in his career in 2005. He didn't return to the promotion until 2012, where he put together an impressive win streak and eventually became the Jungle Fight Lightweight champion.

=== Ultimate Fighting Championship ===
In August 2013, it was announced that Jorge had signed with the UFC. He made his debut at UFC Fight Night 28 as a replacement for Marcelo Guimarães, winning a unanimous decision over Keith Wisniewski.

Jorge then lost a unanimous decision to Rodrigo Damm on February 15, 2014 at UFC Fight Night 36.

Jorge faced Josh Shockley on February 22, 2015 at UFC Fight Night 61. Jorge won the fight via unanimous decision.

Jorge faced Joseph Duffy on July 18, 2015 at UFC Fight Night 72. He lost the fight via submission in the first round and was subsequently released from the promotion.

=== EFN Global ===
Jorge faced Akhmed Aliev on April 22, 2016 at EFN: Fight Nights 45 - Global. He lost the fight via KO (punch) in the second round.

== Mixed martial arts record ==
Professional record breakdown
35 matches	27 wins	8 losses
By knockout	3	5
By submission	13	1
By decision	11	2

Res.	Record	Opponent	Method	Event	Date	Round	Time	Location	Notes
Loss	27–8	Paulo Bueno	TKO (retirement)	Aspera FC 55: Aspera Fighting Championship 55	August 12, 2017	1	5:00	Maringá, Brazil	
Loss	27–7	Muslim Salikhov	KO (spinning back kick)	Kunlun Fight: Cage Fight Series 6	Oct 21, 2016	1	1:00	Yiwu, China	Return to Welterweight.
Win	27–6	Guilherme Miranda	Decision (unanimous)	AFC 41: Road to KSW	9 July 2016	3	5:00	São José, Brazil	
Loss	26–6	Akhmed Aliev	KO (punch)	Fight Nights Global 45: Galiev vs. Stepanyan	22 April 2016	2	4:28	Ufa, Russia	
Loss	26–5	Joseph Duffy	Submission (triangle choke)	UFC Fight Night: Bisping vs. Leites	18 July 2015	1	3:05	Glasgow, Scotland	
Win	26–4	Josh Shockley	Decision (unanimous)	UFC Fight Night: Bigfoot vs. Mir	February 22, 2015	3	5:00	Porto Alegre, Brazil	
Loss	25–4	Rodrigo Damm	Decision (unanimous)	UFC Fight Night: Machida vs. Mousasi	February 15, 2014	3	5:00	Jaraguá do Sul, Brazil	Return to Lightweight.
Win	25–3	Keith Wisniewski	Decision (unanimous)	UFC Fight Night: Teixeira vs. Bader	September 4, 2013	3	5:00	Belo Horizonte, Brazil	Welterweight bout.
Win	24–3	Lucio Abreu	Submission (rear-naked choke)	Jungle Fight 54	June 29, 2013	1	2:10	São Paulo, Brazil	Won the Jungle Fight Lightweight Championship.
Win	23–3	Lindeclecio Oliveira	Submission (rear-naked choke)	Jungle Fight 48	January 25, 2013	1	3:35	São Paulo, Brazil	
Win	22–3	Geovane Salviano	Submission (guillotine choke)	Jungle Fight 42	August 18, 2012	1	1:35	São Paulo, Brazil	
Win	21–3	Ermesson Queiroz	Submission (rear-naked choke)	Heroes 2	June 9, 2012	1	1:14	São José, Brazil	
Win	20–3	Ary Santos	Submission (rear-naked choke)	Jungle Fight 37	March 31, 2012	2	4:28	São Paulo, Brazil	
Win	19–3	Rodrigo Cavalheiro	Submission (arm-triangle choke)	Floripa Fight 8	March 10, 2012	2	N/A	Florianópolis, Brazil	
Loss	18–3	André Santos	Decision (unanimous)	Bitetti Combat 10	October 15, 2011	3	5:00	Rio de Janeiro, Brazil	
Win	18–2	Cristian Ziemer	Submission (punches)	Sao Jose Super Fight 1	October 1, 2011	1	0:16	São José, Brazil	
Win	17–2	Vanderlei Fernandes	Submission (guillotine choke)	Black Trunk Fight 2	May 15, 2011	1	1:36	Florianópolis, Brazil	
Win	16–2	Fabiano Killer	Submission (rear-naked choke)	Floripa Fight 7	March 12, 2011	1	1:12	Florianópolis, Brazil	
Win	15–2	Marco Castanheira	Submission (anaconda choke)	Nitrix Champion Fight 6	February 19, 2011	1	4:32	Brusque, Brazil	
Loss	14–2	Luís Santos	KO (knee)	Amazon Fight 5	October 14, 2010	1	0:52	Belém, Brazil	Welterweight bout.
Win	14–1	Luis Sergio Melo Jr.	Decision (unanimous)	Platinum Fight Brazil 3	May 20, 2010	3	5:00	São Paulo, Brazil	
Win	13–1	Daniel Acácio	Decision (unanimous)	Floripa Fight 6	March 20, 2010	3	5:00	Florianópolis, Brazil	
Win	12–1	Mario Sartori	Decision (unanimous)	Warrior's Challenge 4	December 30, 2009	3	5:00	Porto Belo, Brazil	
Loss	11–1	Yuri Ivlev	TKO (punches)	M-1 Challenge 20: 2009 Finals	December 3, 2009	2	4:11	Rio de Janeiro, Brazil	
Win	11–0	Kaue Dudus	TKO (punches)	Nitrix Show Fight 3	November 14, 2009	2	4:43	Itajaí, Brazil	
Win	10–0	Steve Magdaleno	Decision (unanimous)	M-1 Challenge 19: 2009 Semifinals	September 26, 2009	3	5:00	Rostov Oblast, Russia	Lightweight debut.
Win	9–0	Jadyson Costa	KO (punches)	Blackout FC 3	September 5, 2009	1	N/A	Balneário Camboriú, Brazil	
Win	8–0	Rodrigo Freitas	Decision (split)	WFC Pozil Challenge	August 1, 2009	3	5:00	Gramado, Brazil	
Win	7–0	Arymarcel Santos	TKO (doctor stoppage)	Nitrix Show Fight 2	May 16, 2009	2	5:00	Joinville, Brazil	
Win	6–0	Valdir Linhares	Submission (guillotine choke)	Hombres de Honor 7	November 8, 2008	1	4:16	Barcelona, Spain	
Win	5–0	Andrius Hubaldo	Decision	Jungle Fight 5	November 26, 2005	3	5:00	Manaus, Brazil	
Win	4–0	Fabio Tigrão	Submission (rear-naked choke)	Shooto Brazil Never Shake	October 23, 2004	3	N/A	São Paulo, Brazil	
Win	3–0	Alexandre Barros	Decision (unanimous)	Meca World Vale Tudo 11	June 5, 2004	3	5:00	Rio de Janeiro, Brazil	
Win	2–0	Rafael Freitas	Decision (split)	Meca World Vale Tudo 9	August 1, 2003	3	5:00	Rio de Janeiro, Brazil	
Win	1–0	Carlos Baruch	Submission (guillotine choke)	Heroes 2	June 30, 2001	1	N/A	Rio de Janeiro, Brazil	

== See also ==
- List of current UFC fighters
- List of male mixed martial artists
