= Adriano Martins =

Brazilian mixed martial arts fighter

- Born: Adriano Soares Martins; June 12, 1982 (age 44); Manaus, Amazonas, Brazil
- Height: 5 ft 10 in (1.78 m)
- Weight: 154 lb (70 kg; 11 st 0 lb)
- Division: Lightweight; Welterweight
- Reach: 71 in (180 cm)
- Fighting out of: Manaus, Amazonas, Brazil
- Team: Top Life Academy (until 2015); American Top Team (2015–present)
- Rank: Black belt in Brazilian Jiu-Jitsu under Cristiano Carioca; Brown belt in Judo
- Years active: 2004–present (MMA)

Mixed martial arts record
- Total: 43
- Wins: 29
- By knockout: 13
- By submission: 3
- By decision: 13
- Losses: 13
- By knockout: 3
- By decision: 10
- No contests: 1

Other information
- Mixed martial arts record from Sherdog

Adriano Soares Martins (born June 12, 1982) is a Brazilian mixed martial artist currently competing in the Lightweight division of Taura MMA. A professional competitor since 2004, he has competed for the Ultimate Fighting Championship, Strikeforce and DREAM and Fight Nights Global. Martins is most known for being the only fighter to defeat Islam Makhachev.

== Background ==
Originally from Manaus, Brazil, Martins began training in Judo in 1994, which he continued with until the year 2000, reaching the rank of brown belt. Due to his desire to learn submissions, Martins began training in Brazilian Jiu-Jitsu in 1999. Martins went on to have an accomplished career in Brazilian Jiu-Jitsu, winning various titles. In 2004, needing to support his newly formed family, Martins began mixed martial arts.

== Mixed martial arts career ==
=== Early career ===
Martins made his professional mixed martial arts debut in 2004 and compiled a 23–6 record on the Brazilian circuit before being signed by Strikeforce.

=== Strikeforce ===
Martins was scheduled to make his Strikeforce debut against Isaac Vallie-Flagg on September 29, 2012 at Strikeforce: Melendez vs. Healy. However, the event was cancelled due to an injury to headliner Gilbert Melendez.

Martins faced Jorge Gurgel on January 12, 2013 at Strikeforce: Marquardt vs. Saffiedine. He won the fight via unanimous decision.

=== Ultimate Fighting Championship ===
Martins made his promotional debut against Daron Cruickshank on November 9, 2013 at UFC Fight Night: Belfort vs. Henderson 2. He won via submission due to a straight armbar in the second round. The win also earned him his first Submission of the Night bonus award.

Martins faced Donald Cerrone on January 25, 2014 at UFC on Fox 10. He lost the fight via knockout in the first round.

As the first bout of his new four-fight contract, Martins faced promotional newcomer Juan Puig on July 6, 2014 at The Ultimate Fighter 19 Finale. He won the fight via knockout in the first round, after landing a short, counter right hand. The knockout earned him his first Performance of the Night bonus award.

Martins faced Rustam Khabilov on February 22, 2015 at UFC Fight Night 61. He won the fight by split decision. In the fight, he was able to take and knock Khabilov down at the end of the second round.

Martins faced future UFC Lightweight and Welterweight Champion Islam Makhachev at UFC 192 on October 3, 2015. He won the fight via knockout in the first round, which produced a Performance of the Night bonus. As of 2026, Martins is the only fighter to defeat Makhachev in his career.

Martins next faced Leonardo Santos on October 8, 2016 at UFC 204. Santos was awarded a split decision victory.

Martins faced Kajan Johnson on September 9, 2017 at UFC 215. He lost the fight via knockout in the third round.

Martins was released from the UFC on November 15, 2017.

=== Post-UFC career ===
Martins was scheduled to face Rafael Alves at Titan FC 48 on February 16, 2018. However, the bout was cancelled for unknown reasons.

At FNG 87 on May 20, 2018, he lost to Alexandr Shabliy by unanimous decision.

Martins was scheduled to face former M-1 Global Lightweight Champion Damir Ismagulov on September 21, 2024 at "Alash Pride FC 100". However, Martins withdrew for unknown reasons and was replaced by Oberdan Tenorio.

== Personal life ==
Adriano and his wife Andrezza have a daughter and a son.

== Championships and accomplishments ==
=== Mixed martial arts ===
- Ultimate Fighting Championship
  - Submission of the Night (One time) vs. Daron Cruickshank
  - Performance of the Night (Two times) vs. Juan Puig and Islam Makhachev
- Jungle Fight
  - Jungle Fight Interim Lightweight Championship (two times)
    - One successful title defense
- Win Fight & Entertainment
  - WFE Lightweight Championship (one time)

=== Grappling ===
- Brazilian jiu-jitsu
  - World Bronze Medallist (2006 black)
  - Two-time World Champion (2003 blue, 2004 open weight – purple)
  - CBJJO World Cup Silver Medallist (2005 light weight's absolute – brown)
  - Dumau Cup Champion (2008)
  - Dumau Cup Bronze Medallist (2008 open weight)

== Mixed martial arts record ==
Professional record breakdown
43 matches	29 wins	13 losses
By knockout	13	3
By submission	3	0
By decision	13	10
No contests	1	

Res.	Record	Opponent	Method	Event	Date	Round	Time	Location	Notes
Loss	29–13 (1)	Alexander Sarnavskiy	Decision (unanimous)	BetCity Fight Nights 126	February 21, 2025	3	5:00	Sochi, Russia	
Win	29–12 (1)	Donovan Desmae	Decision (split)	Kongs FC 2	March 30, 2024	3	5:00	Niort, France	Welterweight debut.
Loss	28–12 (1)	Carlos Silva	Decision (unanimous)	Copa Norte de MMA 2021 Finals	July 31, 2021	3	5:00	Manaus, Brazil	
Loss	28–11 (1)	Kaynan Kruschewsky	Decision (unanimous)	Future FC 10	December 6, 2019	3	5:00	São Paulo, Brazil	
NC	28–10 (1)	Adriano Rodrigues	NC (accidental eye poke)	Shooto Brasil 90	March 15, 2019	1	N/A	Rio de Janeiro, Brazil	Catchweight (163 lb) bout. Accidental eye poke rendered Martins unable to continue.
Loss	28–10	Alexandr Shabliy	Decision (unanimous)	Fight Nights Global 87	May 19, 2018	3	5:00	Rostov-on-Don, Russia	
Loss	28–9	Kajan Johnson	KO (punch)	UFC 215	September 9, 2017	3	0:49	Edmonton, Alberta, Canada	
Loss	28–8	Leonardo Santos	Decision (split)	UFC 204	October 8, 2016	3	5:00	Manchester, England	
Win	28–7	Islam Makhachev	KO (punch)	UFC 192	October 3, 2015	1	1:46	Houston, Texas, United States	Performance of the Night.
Win	27–7	Rustam Khabilov	Decision (split)	UFC Fight Night: Bigfoot vs. Mir	February 22, 2015	3	5:00	Porto Alegre, Brazil	
Win	26–7	Juan Manuel Puig	KO (punch)	The Ultimate Fighter: Team Edgar vs. Team Penn Finale	July 6, 2014	1	2:21	Las Vegas, Nevada, United States	Performance of the Night.
Loss	25–7	Donald Cerrone	KO (head kick)	UFC on Fox: Henderson vs. Thomson	January 25, 2014	1	4:40	Chicago, Illinois, United States	
Win	25–6	Daron Cruickshank	Submission (straight armbar)	UFC Fight Night: Belfort vs. Henderson 2	November 9, 2013	2	2:49	Goiânia, Brazil	Submission of the Night.
Win	24–6	Jorge Gurgel	Decision (unanimous)	Strikeforce: Marquardt vs. Saffiedine	January 12, 2013	3	5:00	Oklahoma City, Oklahoma, United States	
Win	23–6	Jimmy Donahue	TKO (punches)	Jungle Fight 37	March 31, 2012	1	1:02	São Paulo, Brazil	Defended the Jungle Fight Lightweight Championship.
Win	22–6	Neilson Gomes	TKO (punches)	Jungle Fight 34	November 26, 2011	1	1:21	Rio de Janeiro, Brazil	Won the interim Jungle Fight Lightweight Championship.
Win	21–6	Marcio Castanheira	Submission (guillotine choke)	Mr. Cage 6	September 30, 2011	1	N/A	Manaus, Brazil	
Win	20–6	Diego Braga Alves	Decision (unanimous)	WFE 10: Platinum	September 16, 2011	5	5:00	Salvador, Brazil	Won the WFE Lightweight Championship.
Loss	19–6	Francisco Trinaldo	Decision (majority)	Jungle Fight 30	July 30, 2011	3	5:00	Belém, Brazil	For the Jungle Fight Lightweight Championship.
Win	19–5	Jamil Silveira	TKO (punches)	Mr. Cage 5	April 29, 2011	2	2:19	Manaus, Brazil	
Win	18–5	Ronildo Augusto	TKO (punches)	Jungle Fight 27	April 21, 2011	1	2:54	Brasília, Brazil	Won the interim Jungle Fight Lightweight Championship.
Win	17–5	Nilson Assunção	TKO (corner stoppage)	Jungle Fight 26	April 2, 2011	1	N/A	São Paulo, Brazil	
Win	16–5	Ronys Torres	Decision (unanimous)	Amazon Show Combat	September 9, 2010	3	5:00	Manaus, Brazil	
Win	15–5	Pedro Irie	Decision (split)	MF 7: Rally Brazil	July 24, 2010	3	5:00	Itatiba, Brazil	
Win	14–5	Dylan Clay	Decision (unanimous)	VTC: Brazil vs. USA	March 6, 2010	3	5:00	Manaus, Brazil	
Loss	13–5	Jamil Silveira	Decision (split)	Vision Fight	December 20, 2009	3	5:00	Boa Vista, Brazil	
Win	13–4	Daniel Trindade	Decision (unanimous)	Roraima Show Fight 5	July 12, 2009	3	5:00	Boa Vista, Brazil	
Win	12–4	Luis Santos	Decision (split)	Hero's The Jungle 3	May 9, 2009	3	5:00	Manaus, Brazil	
Loss	11–4	Keita Nakamura	Decision (split)	Dream 6	September 23, 2008	2	5:00	Saitama, Japan	
Loss	11–3	Ronys Torres	TKO (doctor stoppage)	Hero's the Jungle 2	April 7, 2008	2	N/A	Manaus, Brazil	
Win	11–2	Diego Braga Alves	Decision (unanimous)	Amazon Challenge 2	March 1, 2008	3	5:00	Manaus, Brazil	
Win	10–2	Michel Addario Bastos	TKO (punches)	Hero's the Jungle	October 13, 2007	1	4:24	Manaus, Brazil	
Win	9–2	Julian Fabrin	TKO (punches)	Cassino Fight 4	September 15, 2007	3	1:19	Manaus, Brazil	
Win	8–2	Luciano Azevedo	Decision (split)	Cassino Fight 3	April 21, 2007	3	5:00	Manaus, Brazil	
Win	7–2	Steve Reyna	Submission (rear-naked choke)	Jungle Fight 6	April 29, 2006	2	0:35	Manaus, Brazil	
Win	6–2	Daniel Trindade	KO (knee)	Roraima Kombat	April 8, 2006	2	3:01	Boa Vista, Brazil	
Win	5–2	Jorge Clay	TKO (punches)	Amazon Ultimate Fight	June 4, 2005	3	1:40	Manaus, Brazil	
Win	4–2	Daniel Trindade	KO (punches)	Roraima Combat 1	April 8, 2005	2	N/A	Boa Vista, Brazil	
Loss	3–2	Gleison Tibau	Decision (unanimous)	Amazônia Fight 1	June 20, 2005	3	5:00	Manaus, Brazil	
Loss	3–1	Boris Jonstomp	Decision	Jungle Fight 2	May 15, 2004	3	5:00	Manaus, Brazil	
Win	3–0	Erick Cardoso	Decision (unanimous)	Gladiator of the Jungle 1	March 7, 2004	1	10:00	Manaus, Brazil	
Win	2–0	Robert Fonseca	KO (punches)	Gladiator of the Jungle 1	March 7, 2004	1	4:53	Manaus, Brazil	
Win	1–0	Lucas Lopes	Decision (unanimous)	Gladiator of the Jungle 1	March 7, 2004	1	10:00	Manaus, Brazil	Lightweight debut.

== See also ==
- List of current UFC fighters
- List of male mixed martial artists
