= Keith Wisniewski =

American mixed martial arts fighter

- Born: October 25, 1981 (age 44); Portage, Indiana, United States
- Other names: The Polish Connection
- Nationality: American
- Height: 5 ft 11 in (180 cm)
- Weight: 170 lb (77 kg; 12 st 2 lb)
- Division: Light Heavyweight; Middleweight; Welterweight; Lightweight
- Fighting out of: Hobart, Indiana, United States
- Team: Duneland Vale Tudo
- Years active: 1998-present

Mixed martial arts record
- Total: 44
- Wins: 28
- By knockout: 6
- By submission: 15
- By decision: 7
- Losses: 15
- By knockout: 4
- By submission: 3
- By decision: 8
- Draws: 1

Other information
- Mixed martial arts record from Sherdog

Keith Wisniewski (born October 25, 1981) is an American professional mixed martial artist currently competing in the Welterweight division. He has competed for the UFC, IFL, M-1 Global, Ironheart Crown, and BodogFIGHT.

== Mixed martial arts career ==
=== Ultimate Fighting Championship ===
Wisniewski made his UFC debut at UFC 56 against Nick Thompson. He lost a unanimous decision.

=== Post-UFC ===
Following his release from the UFC, Wisniewski lost four straight fights but then went on a six-fight winning streak that included victories over UFC veterans Pete Spratt and Chris Wilson, leading to him being re-signed with the promotion.

=== Return to UFC ===
Wisniewski faced Josh Neer in his UFC return on October 1, 2011, at UFC Live: Cruz vs. Johnson. He lost the fight via TKO (doctor stoppage) at the conclusion of the second round.

Wisniewski faced newcomer Chris Clements on April 21, 2012, at UFC 145. He lost the fight via split decision after three back and forth rounds.

Wisniewski was slated to face Marcelo Guimares on September 4, 2013, at UFC Fight Night 28. However, Guimaraes pulled out of the bout citing an injury and was replaced by Ivan Jorge. He lost the fight via unanimous decision and was subsequently released from the promotion.

== Mixed martial arts record ==
Professional record breakdown
44 matches	28 wins	15 losses
By knockout	6	4
By submission	15	3
By decision	7	8
Draws	1	

Res.	Record	Opponent	Method	Event	Date	Round	Time	Location	Notes
Loss	28–15–1	Ivan Jorge	Decision (unanimous)	UFC Fight Night: Teixeira vs. Bader	September 4, 2013	3	5:00	Belo Horizonte, Brazil	
Loss	28–14–1	Chris Clements	Decision (split)	UFC 145	April 21, 2012	3	5:00	Atlanta, Georgia, United States	
Loss	28–13–1	Josh Neer	TKO (doctor stoppage)	UFC Live: Cruz vs. Johnson	October 1, 2011	2	5:00	Washington, D.C., United States	
Win	28–12–1	Chris Wilson	Decision (unanimous)	Hoosier FC 7: Validation	April 9, 2011	3	5:00	Valparaiso, Indiana, United States	
Win	27–12–1	Randy Crawford	KO (knee)	Cutthroat MMA: Supremacy 2	February 19, 2011	1	0:21	Hammond, Indiana, United States	
Win	26–12–1	Ted Worthington	Submission (heel hook)	Xtreme Fighting Organization 35	June 10, 2010	2	3:56	Chicago, Illinois, United States	
Win	25–12–1	Pete Spratt	Submission (rear-naked choke)	Hoosier FC 2: It's On	January 2, 2010	1	4:07	Hammond, Indiana, United States	
Win	24–12–1	Tristan Yunker	TKO (punches)	War in the Yard	August 8, 2009	2	1:12	Anderson, Indiana, United States	
Win	23–12–1	Johnny Davis	Submission (rear-naked choke)	C3: Corral Combat Classic 2	April 26, 2008	1	2:00	Hammond, Indiana, United States	
Loss	22–12–1	Carlo Prater	Decision (split)	Art of War 3	September 1, 2007	3	5:00	Dallas, Texas, United States	
Loss	22–11–1	Erik Oganov	Decision (split)	Bodog Fight: USA vs. Russia	December 2, 2006	3	5:00	Vancouver, British Columbia, Canada	
Loss	22–10–1	Rory Markham	TKO (corner stoppage)	IFL: World Championship Semifinals	November 2, 2006	3	4:00	Portland, Oregon, United States	
Loss	22–9–1	Jorge Masvidal	Decision (majority)	BodogFIGHT: To the Brink of War	August 22, 2006	3	5:00	San José, Costa Rica	
Loss	22–8–1	Nick Thompson	Decision (unanimous)	UFC 56: Full Force	November 19, 2005	3	5:00	Las Vegas, Nevada, United States	
Win	22–7–1	Carlo Prater	Decision (unanimous)	FFC 15: Fiesta Las Vegas	September 14, 2005	3	5:00	Las Vegas, Nevada, United States	Return to Welterweight.
Win	21–7–1	Musail Allaudinov	TKO (punches)	Euphoria: USA vs. Russia	May 14, 2005	3	1:04	Atlantic City, New Jersey, United States	Lightweight debut.
Loss	20–7–1	Shinya Aoki	Submission (standing armlock)	Shooto: 1/29 in Korakuen Hall	January 29, 2005	1	2:22	Tokyo, Japan	
Win	20–6–1	Carlo Prater	Decision (split)	Freestyle Fighting Championships 13	December 10, 2004	3	5:00	Biloxi, Mississippi, United States	
Win	19–6–1	Derrick Noble	Decision (unanimous)	IHC 8: Ethereal	November 20, 2004	3	5:00	Hammond, Indiana, United States	
Win	18–6–1	Steve Berger	Decision (unanimous)	Combat: Do Fighting Challenge 1	October 23, 2004	3	5:00	Cicero, Illinois, United States	
Win	17–6–1	Kyle Jensen	Submission (rear-naked choke)	Extreme Challenge 59	September 24, 2004	1	2:19	Medina, Minnesota, United States	
Loss	16–6–1	Jason Black	Decision	Xtreme Kage Kombat	August 7, 2004	3	5:00	Des Moines, Iowa, United States	
Win	16–5–1	Chris Moore	Submission (rear-naked choke)	IHC 7: The Crucible	June 5, 2004	1	1:59	Hammond, Indiana, United States	
Win	15–5–1	Jorge Santiago	KO (punches)	Absolute Fighting Championships 6	December 6, 2003	3	2:14	Fort Lauderdale, Florida, United States	
Win	14–5–1	Danila Veselov	Submission (guillotine choke)	M-1 MFC - Russia vs. the World 6	October 10, 2003	1	1:54	Moscow, Russia	
Win	13–5–1	Eddie Sanchez	Submission (choke)	TFC 8: Hell Raiser	June 6, 2003	1	N/A	Toledo, Ohio, United States	
Win	12–5–1	Nuri Shakir	Submission (guillotine choke)	USMMA 3: Ring of Fury	May 3, 2003	1	0:46	Boston, Massachusetts, United States	
Win	11–5–1	Marco Macera	TKO (punches)	Battle of New Orleans 4	February 15, 2003	1	1:32	Metairie, Louisiana, United States	
Win	10–5–1	Matt Lee	TKO (punches)	USMMA 2: Ring of Fury	September 21, 2002	2	4:19	Lowell, Massachusetts, United States	
Loss	9–5–1	John Renken	Submission (kneebar)	HOOKnSHOOT: Relentless	May 25, 2002	2	1:43	Evansville, Indiana, United States	Middleweight bout.
Win	9–4–1	Eric Pettit	Submission (rear-naked choke)	SC 1: The Awakening	July 1, 2000	1	N/A	Canton, Illinois, United States	
Win	8–4–1	Jason Glabus	Submission (choke)	Chicago Challenge 7	May 20, 2000	1	N/A	Chicago, Illinois, United States	
Win	7–4–1	Dale Carson	Submission (rear-naked choke)	HOOKnSHOOT: Trial 3	April 29, 2000	1	N/A	Tell City, Indiana, United States	Light Heavyweight bout.
Loss	6–4–1	CJ Fernandes	TKO (submission to punches)	TFC 1: Fightzone 1	February 26, 2000	1	31:30	Fort Wayne, Indiana, United States	
Win	6–3–1	Angelo Popofski	Decision (unanimous)	HOOKnSHOOT: Millennium	November 6, 1999	1	15:00	N/A	
Loss	5–3–1	Adrian Serrano	Submission (americana)	HOOKnSHOOT: Texas Heat	October 2, 1999	1	6:30	N/A	
Win	5–2–1	Pat Heidenreich	Submission (armbar)	Night of the Diamonds	September 18, 1999	1	N/A	N/A	
Draw	4–2–1	Jason Glabus	Draw	Chicago Challenge 6	May 22, 1999	1	10:00	Chicago, Illinois, United States	
Loss	4–2	Shonie Carter	KO (spinning back fist)	Indiana Martial Arts Challenge 3	March 6, 1999	1	0:40	Indiana, United States	
Win	4–1	Jim Rhodes	Submission (armbar)	Chicago Challenge 5	November 1, 1998	1	N/A	Chicago, Illinois, United States	
Win	3–1	Josh Cate	Submission (triangle choke)	Fearless Freestyle Fighting 3	September 28, 1998	1	5:08	N/A	
Win	2–1	Brandon Bledsoe	Submission (rear-naked choke)	Fearless Freestyle Fighting 3	September 28, 1998	1	2:07	N/A	
Win	1–1	Robert Humphreys	Decision (unanimous)	Fearless Freestyle Fighting 2	May 9, 1998	1	15:00	N/A	
Loss	0–1	Joey Gilbert	Decision (split)	JKD: Challenge 2	April 25, 1998	3	5:00	Chicago, Illinois, United States	
