= Ariau Towers =

Abandoned boutique hotel northwest of Manaus, Brazil

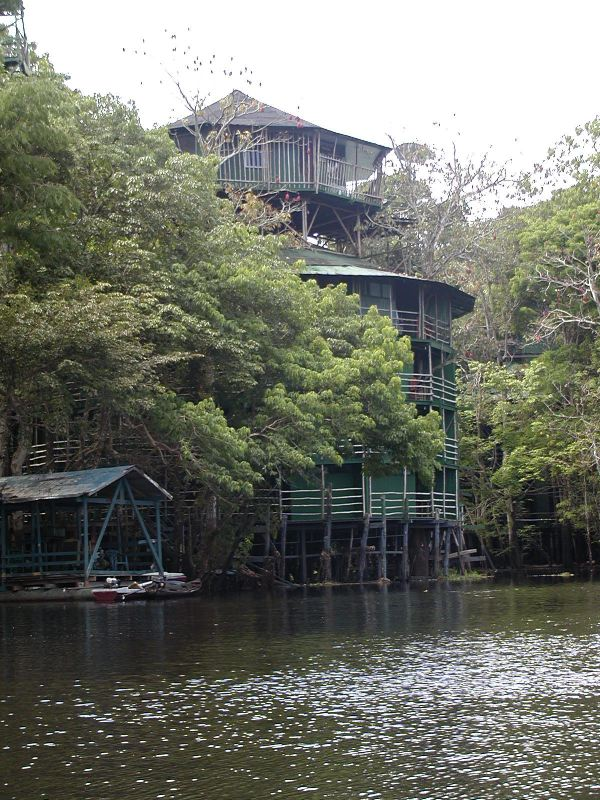
- The first of the Ariau Towers
- Interactive map of the Ariau Towers area

General information
- Status: Abandoned
- Location: Rio Negro, Brazil
- Coordinates: 3.0900°S 60.4405°W
- Closed: 2016

Other information
- Number of rooms: 288

The Ariau Towers is an abandoned boutique hotel in Brazil. It is located 60 km northwest of Manaus on the Rio Negro, a major tributary of the Amazon River. The concept for the property was that of Dr. Francisco Ritta Bernardino. The property featured 6 towers, with all 291 rooms elevated from the rain forest floor by approximately 10-20m and connected by approximates 5 miles (8.0 km) of catwalks. Amenities included two restaurants and three swimming pools.

The hotel complex was one of the oldest and largest jungle lodges in the Amazon. It became known for its luxury accommodations and celebrity guests. Describing it as "the ultimate treehouse", travel writer Patricia Schulz included the hotel as one of her "1,000 Places to See Before You Die". On the other hand, the editors of Frommer's South America severely criticized the hotel for its "mass-market" offerings and its lack of environmental sensitivity, calling it "all that is wrong with Amazon 'ecotourism'". The hotel closed down in 2016.

== Structure ==
The hotel had 288 units split amongst apartments, suites (located in the towers) and tree houses. The tallest of the units, the Tarzan House, was built on top of a living mahogany tree, at the height of 22 m from the ground. The towers were interlinked by a wooden catwalk system of approximately 5 miles (8.0 km), all within the canopy of the rainforest. Other facilities within these tree tops included 2 swimming pools, two observation towers 134 ft (41 m) high and a panoramic auditorium for 450 people. There were also restaurants serving regional foods, bars and convenience stores.

== Activities ==
The hotel had various tours available within the forest, such as canoe walk, jungle walk, piranha fishing, visit to native's houses, and observation of nightlife animals. Visitors could also observe the Meeting of the Waters, where the Rio Negro and the Solimoes River meet, but because of density and different temperatures don't get mixed. The separate shades of water run side by side for a length of more than four miles (6 km) without mixing. Macaws and various species of native and non-native monkeys are common around the towers.

== Closure ==
In 2015, the government seized the property and planned to sell it to pay off its debt, with an asking price of US$8.3 million. A news item in May 2017 stated that the property would be sold by auction in September of that year with a suggested price of US$2.3 million, and a minimum bid of 2 million. A real estate listing in August 2019 indicated that the property was then for sale for €2.5 million. The description provided these specifics:

The Ariaú closed the doors in 2016, despite the abandonment, the facilities still impress, with an architecture totally adapted to the forest and the river ... with all the advances would make this hotel again a unique hotel worldwide.

All the usable materials of the hotel, inside and outside, were stripped for re-use by locals by 2022.
