= Francisco Figueiredo =

Brazilian mixed martial arts fighter

- Born: Francisco Nazareno da Costa Figueiredo Junior; October 23, 1989 (age 36); Soure, Pará, Brazil
- Other names: Sniper
- Height: 5 ft 6 in (1.68 m)
- Weight: 125 lb (57 kg; 8 st 13 lb)
- Division: Flyweight
- Reach: 68.0 in (173 cm)
- Fighting out of: Belém, Para, Brazil
- Team: Team Figueiredo
- Years active: 2009–present

Mixed martial arts record
- Total: 22
- Wins: 14
- By knockout: 4
- By submission: 8
- By decision: 2
- Losses: 6
- By knockout: 2
- By submission: 2
- By decision: 2
- Draws: 1
- No contests: 1

Other information
- Notable relatives: Deiveson Figueiredo (brother)
- Mixed martial arts record from Sherdog

Francisco Nazareno da Costa Figueiredo Junior (born October 23, 1989) is a Brazilian mixed martial artist who competed in the Flyweight division of the Ultimate Fighting Championship. He is the younger brother of the two-time and former UFC Flyweight Champion Deiveson Figueiredo.

== Background ==
Figueiredo was born in Soure, Pará, Brazil, a small city on the isle of Marajó where buffaloes roam freely. His father was a buffalo herder who practiced luta marajoara, a local folk wrestling style. Francisco has a younger sister and a brother – Deiveson – who also is a professional mixed martial artist signed with the UFC. He was the first brother to move to Belém to attend high school and started training in capoeira at the age of 13. He worked as a bartender and assistant in a sushi kitchen before concentrating full time on his fight career.

== Mixed martial arts career ==
=== Early career ===
Starting his professional career in 2009, he compiled up a professional MMA record of 11-3-1 (1), over a decade on the Brazilian regional scene, most notably making a name fighting for Jungle Fight promotion. After winning the Jungle Fight Interim Bantamweight Championship at Jungle Fight 93 against Manoel dos Santos, at Jungle Fight 95 he fought to a draw in a title unification bout with Eduardo Souza at Jungle Fight 95. Figueiredo was scheduled to appear at Jungle Fight 103 against Klinger Pinheiro, the reigning bantamweight champion, but the event was canceled because of the coronavirus pandemic.

=== Ultimate Fighting Championship ===
Figueiredo made his UFC debut against Jerome Rivera at UFC on ESPN: Chiesa vs. Magny on January 20, 2021. He won the bout via unanimous decision.

In his sophomore performance, Figueiredo faced Malcolm Gordon on July 17, 2021, at UFC on ESPN 26. He lost the fight via unanimous decision.

Figueiredo was scheduled to face Jake Hadley on March 19, 2022, at UFC Fight Night: Volkov vs. Aspinall. However, Figueiredo withdrew from the event due to undisclosed reasons and was replaced by Allan Nascimento.

Figueiredo faced Daniel da Silva on April 30, 2022, at UFC on ESPN: Font vs. Vera. He won the fight via kneebar submission in the first round. This win earned him his first Performance of the Night bonus award.

Figueiredo faced Amir Albazi on August 20, 2022, at UFC 278. He lost the bout via rear-naked choke at the end of first round.

On August, it was announced that Figueiredo was not longer in the UFC roster.

== Championships and accomplishments ==
- Jungle Fight Championship
  - Jungle Fight Interim Bantamweight Championship (One time)
- Ultimate Fighting Championship
  - Performance of the Night (One time) (vs. Daniel Lacerda)

== Mixed martial arts record ==
Professional record breakdown
22 matches	14 wins	6 losses
By knockout	4	2
By submission	8	2
By decision	2	2
Draws	1	
No contests	1	

Res.	Record	Opponent	Method	Event	Date	Round	Time	Location	Notes
Win	14–6–1 (1)	Yunus Evloev	TKO (elbows)	ACA 208	October 4, 2026	3	0:58	Grozny, Russia	
Loss	13–6–1 (1)	Dzhamaludin Aliev	TKO (punches)	Core FC 1	April 26, 2025	1	2:23	Istanbul, Turkey	Return to Bantamweight.
Loss	13–5–1 (1)	Amir Albazi	Submission (rear-naked choke)	UFC 278	August 20, 2022	1	4:34	Salt Lake City, Utah, United States	
Win	13–4–1 (1)	Daniel da Silva	Submission (kneebar)	UFC on ESPN: Font vs. Vera	April 30, 2022	1	1:18	Las Vegas, Nevada, United States	Performance of the Night.
Loss	12–4–1 (1)	Malcolm Gordon	Decision (unanimous)	UFC on ESPN: Makhachev vs. Moisés	July 17, 2021	3	5:00	Las Vegas, Nevada, United States	
Win	12–3–1 (1)	Jerome Rivera	Decision (unanimous)	UFC on ESPN: Chiesa vs. Magny	January 20, 2021	3	5:00	Abu Dhabi, United Arab Emirates	Flyweight debut.
Draw	11–3–1 (1)	Eduardo de Souza Silva	Draw (unanimous)	Jungle Fight 95	September 28, 2019	3	5:00	Rio de Janeiro, Brazil	For the Jungle Fight Bantamweight Championship.
Win	11–3 (1)	Manoel Moreira dos Santos Jr.	TKO (punches)	Jungle Fight 93	April 28, 2018	2	N/A	Belém, Brazil	Won the Interim Jungle Fight Bantamweight Championship.
Win	10–3 (1)	Vitor Leandro	TKO (punches)	Salvaterra Marajó Fight 7	November 30, 2017	1	N/A	Salvaterra, Brazil	
Loss	9–3 (1)	Eduardo de Souza Silva	Decision (split)	Jungle Fight 91	July 15, 2017	3	5:00	Contagem, Brazil	For the vacant Jungle Fight Bantamweight Championship.
Win	9–2 (1)	Cristiano Santos da Silva	Submission (arm-triangle choke)	Marajó Open Fight 2	November 10, 2016	2	2:54	Soure, Brazil	
NC	8–2 (1)	Jose Silva	No Contest	Super Bad Boy's Fight 3	April 11, 2014	N/A	N/A	Belém, Brazil	
Win	8–2	Josue Junior Souza	Submission (armbar)	Boxe Thai Belém: Super Fight	March 22, 2014	1	2:48	Belém, Brazil	
Win	7–2	Fabricio Viegas Sarraff	Decision (unanimous)	Jungle Fight 52	May 4, 2013	3	5:00	Belém, Brazil	Return to Bantamweight.
Loss	6–2	Luis Nogueira	Submission (arm-triangle choke)	Best of the Best 2	November 29, 2012	2	N/A	Belém, Brazil	Featherweight debut.
Win	6–1	Anderson dos Santos de Souza	TKO (retirement)	Amazon Fight 17	May 25, 2012	2	2:24	Bragança, Brazil	
Loss	5–1	John Lineker	TKO (punches)	Jungle Fight 30	July 30, 2011	3	0:36	Belém, Brazil	
Win	5–0	Emerson Domingo do Nascimento	Submission (triangle choke)	Dead Serious 18	December 3, 2010	2	N/A	Belém, Brazil	
Win	4–0	Wilker Pereira Ribeiro da Costa	Submission (armbar)	Iron Man Fight: Extreme	August 12, 2010	1	N/A	Belém, Brazil	
Win	3–0	Milton Ivan Lima Franco	Submission (armbar)	Iron Man Fight: Extreme	August 12, 2010	1	N/A	Belém, Brazil	
Win	2–0	Victor Bad Boy	Submission (armbar)	Super Combat 6	February 12, 2010	1	4:20	Capanema, Brazil	
Win	1–0	Biafra Reis	Submission (rear-naked choke)	Super Combat 5	October 16, 2009	3	3:05	Capanema, Brazil	Bantamweight debut.

== See also ==
- List of male mixed martial artists
