= Ginásio Nélio Dias =

Indoor sporting arena in Natal, Brazil

Coordinates: 5°43′59.86″S 35°15′13.82″W

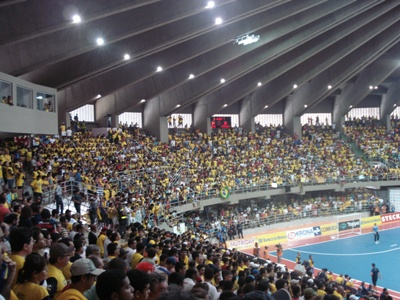
- Interactive map of Ginásio Nélio Dias
- Full name: Ginásio Nélio Dias
- Location: Natal, Brazil
- Capacity: 10,000

Construction
- Groundbreaking: 2006
- Opened: December 13, 2008

Ginásio Nélio Dias is an indoor sporting arena located in Natal, Brazil. The capacity of the arena is 10,000 spectators and opened in 2008. It hosts indoor sporting events such as basketball and volleyball, and also hosts concerts.
