= Ginásio do Pacaembu =

Sports arena in Brazil

Ginásio do Mercado Livre Arena Pacaembu
- Ginásio do Pacaembu
- Interactive map of Ginásio do Mercado Livre Arena Pacaembu
- Location: Praça Charles Miller; Pacaembu, São Paulo, Brazil
- Coordinates: 23°33′00.5″S 46°39′54.7″W
- Owner: São Paulo Municipality
- Operator: Allegra Pacaembu
- Capacity: 3,000
- Surface: wood

Construction
- Opened: April 27, 1940
- Renovated: 2021-2024
- Architect: Benedito Junqueira Duarte

Website
- mercadolivrearenapacaembu.com

Ginásio do Pacaembu, officially known as Ginásio Mercado Livre Arena Pacaembu since 2024 due to naming rights, is an indoor multi-purpose sports arena located within the Complexo Esportivo do Pacaembu in the Pacaembu neighborhood of São Paulo, Brazil. Opened in 1940 as part of the Pacaembu Sports Complex, the gymnasium has a seating capacity of 3,000 and primarily hosts basketball, volleyball, futsal, and other indoor sports events. It is owned by the Municipality of São Paulo and operated by the concessionaire Allegra Pacaembu under a 35-year agreement since 2019.

== History ==
The Ginásio do Pacaembu was constructed between 1936 and 1940 as an integral part of the Estádio Municipal Paulo Machado de Carvalho (Pacaembu Stadium), a major public works project initiated under Mayor Fábio da Silva Prado to promote physical education and civic engagement in São Paulo. Designed in the Art Deco style by architect Benedito Junqueira Duarte, the arena opened on April 27, 1940, coinciding with the stadium's inauguration. It has since served as a hub for amateur and professional indoor sports, including national championships in basketball and volleyball, and has occasionally hosted cultural events such as concerts. Major renovations took place in 2001 to update structural, electrical, and safety systems. Between 2021 and 2024, as part of a comprehensive R$600 million overhaul of the Pacaembu Complex by Allegra Pacaembu, the gymnasium received modern upgrades including improved flooring, lighting, accessibility features, and integration with new facilities like eSports areas and rehabilitation centers. In January 2024, Mercado Livre acquired naming rights for the entire complex in a 30-year deal valued at up to R$1 billion, renaming the gymnasium accordingly.

== Facilities and events ==
The arena features a standard indoor court for basketball, volleyball, and futsal, with fixed seating for 3,000 spectators. It is part of the broader Pacaembu Complex, which includes an Olympic swimming pool, tennis courts, and an athletics track. Post-renovation, the gymnasium supports hybrid events, including eSports tournaments and community programs in partnership with institutions like Hospital Albert Einstein. Notable events include regular home games for São Paulo FC's basketball team in the Novo Basquete Brasil (NBB) league, national volleyball league matches, and futsal competitions. It has also hosted cultural performances and youth athletic tournaments since the mid-20th century.

== 2025 FIVB Women's Club World Championship ==
The Ginásio do Pacaembu will host the 2025 FIVB Volleyball Women's Club World Championship, the 20th edition of the annual international women's club volleyball competition organized by the Fédération Internationale de Volleyball (FIVB). The tournament is scheduled from 9 to 14 December 2025 in São Paulo, Brazil, with all matches taking place at the arena, which has a capacity of 3,000 spectators. It will feature eight teams from five confederations: Osasco São Cristóvão Saúde (Brazil, hosts and CSV champions), Prosecco Doc Imoco Conegliano (Italy, CEV European champions), Savino Del Bene Scandicci (Italy, CEV European runners-up), Zhetysu VC (Kazakhstan, AVC Asian champions), VTV Bình Điền Long An (Vietnam, AVC Asian runners-up; withdrew and replaced by Orlando Valkyries from NORCECA via wild card), Dentil Praia (Brazil, CSV South American champions), Alianza Lima Volleyball (Peru, CSV South American runners-up), and Zamalek SC (Egypt, CAVB African champions). The competition will follow a format with two preliminary round-robin pools of four teams each, where the top two teams from each pool advance to the semifinals (Pool A winner vs. Pool B runner-up, and vice versa). Semifinal winners will contest the gold medal match, while losers play for bronze. Pool standings will be determined by victories, match points, set ratios, point ratios, and head-to-head results. The preliminary round begins on 9 December 2025, with semifinals on 13 December and the third-place match and final on 14 December. This event marks the first time the FIVB Women's Club World Championship will be held in Brazil since 2012 and underscores the venue's renewed prominence in international volleyball following its recent renovations.
