= 2008 in King of the Cage =

Mixed martial arts events

Information
- First date: January 12, 2008
- Last date: December 11, 2008

Events
- Total events: 26

Fights
- Total fights: 197
- Title fights: 14

Chronology
2007 in KOTC	2008 in King of the Cage	2009 in KOTC

The year 2008 is the tenth year in the history of King of the Cage, a mixed martial arts promotion based in the United States. In 2008 King of the Cage held 26 events, KOTC: Hard Knocks.

== Title fights ==
Title fights in 2008
Weight class				Method	Round	Time	Event	Notes
Junior Welterweight	Joe Camacho	def.	Thomas Denny	KO (Punches)	2	0:37	KOTC: Premiere	(Note: For the King of the Cage Junior Welterweight Championship.)
Bantamweight	Matt Jaggers	def.	Joe Voisin	Decision (Unanimous)	5	0:00	KOTC: Stand Off	(Note: For the King of the Cage Bantamweight Championship.)
Welterweight	Aaron Wetherspoon (c)	def.	John Mahlow	TKO	3	1:09	KOTC: Tsunami II	(Note: For the King of the Cage Welterweight Championship.)
Welterweight	Aaron Wetherspoon (c)	vs.	Anthony Lapsley	No Contest	2	0:00	KOTC: Opposing Force	(Note: For the King of the Cage Welterweight Championship.)
Flyweight	Abel Cullum	def.	Ryan Diaz	Submission (Armbar)	5	1:27	KOTC: Reckless	(Note: For the King of the Cage Flyweight Championship.)
Bantamweight	Lazar Stojadinovic	def.	Matt Jaggers (c)	TKO (Punches)	3	0:21	KOTC: Settlement	(Note: For the King of the Cage Bantamweight Championship.)
Heavyweight	Tony Lopez	def.	Wes Combs	Submission (Kimura)	2	2:59	KOTC: Rock Solid	(Note: For the King of the Cage Heavyweight Championship.)
Welterweight	Anthony Lapsley	def.	Aaron Wetherspoon (c)	Submission (Scarf Hold Armlock)	1	1:34	KOTC: Bio Hazard	(Note: For the King of the Cage Welterweight Championship.)
Junior Welterweight	Victor Valenzuela	def.	Joe Camacho (c)	TKO (Punch to the Body)	2	2:14	KOTC: Bio Hazard	(Note: For the King of the Cage Junior Welterweight Championship.)
Light Heavyweight	Tony Lopez	def.	Fernando Gonzalez	Submission (Rear-Naked Choke)	2	1:37	KOTC: Misconduct	(Note: For the King of the Cage Light Heavyweight Championship.)
Middleweight	Brandon Hunt	def.	Brad Burrick	Decision (Unanimous)	5	3:00	KOTC: Anticipation	(Note: For The King of the Cage Middleweight Championship.)
Flyweight	Abel Cullum (c)	def.	Brett Roller	Submission (Rear-Naked Choke)	1	1:47	KOTC: Goodfellas	(Note: For the King of the Cage Flyweight Championship.)
Bantamweight	Angelo Sanchez	def.	Tony Hervey	Decision (Split)	5	5:00	KOTC: Goodfellas	(Note: For the King of the Cage Bantamweight Championship.)
Welterweight	Michael Guymon	def.	Anthony Lapsley (c)	Submission (Arm-Triangle Choke)	5	3:37	KOTC: Prowler	(Note: For the King of the Cage Welterweight Championship.)

== Events list ==
#	Event title	Date	Arena	Location
134	KOTC: Prowler	December 11, 2008	San Manuel Casino	Highland, California
133	KOTC: Goodfellas	December 6, 2008	Isleta Casino	Albuquerque, New Mexico
132	KOTC: Anticipation	November 26, 2008	Soaring Eagle Casino	Mount Pleasant, Michigan
131	KOTC: Bragging Rights	November 20, 2008	Ohio Expo Center Coliseum	Columbus, Ohio
130	KOTC: Frost Bite	November 7, 2008	Kewadin Casino	Sault Ste. Marie, Michigan
129	KOTC: Level One	October 18, 2008	Lake of the Torches Casino	Lac du Flambeau, Wisconsin
128	KOTC: Misconduct	October 16, 2008	San Manuel Casino	Highland, California
127	KOTC: Cage Masters	October 4, 2008	Avi Resort and Casino	Laughlin, Nevada
126	KOTC: Retribution	August 30, 2008	Ute Mountain Casino	Cortez, Colorado
125	KOTC: Bio Hazard	August 14, 2008	San Manuel Casino	Highland, California
124	KOTC: Rock Solid	July 19, 2008	Lake of the Torches Casino	Lac du Flambeau, Wisconsin
123	KOTC: Badlands	July 12, 2008	Isleta Casino	Albuquerque, New Mexico
122	KOTC: Settlement	June 13, 2008	Soaring Eagle Casino	Mount Pleasant, Michigan
121	KOTC: Smashing Machine	May 31, 2008	Ute Mountain Casino	Towaoc, Colorado
120	KOTC: Rising Stars	May 24, 2008	Kiowa Casino	Devol, Oklahoma
119	KOTC: Reckless	May 17, 2008	Harlow's Casino Resort	Greenville, Mississippi
118	KOTC: Opposing Force	May 15, 2008	San Manuel Casino	Highland, California
117	KOTC: Fight Nite @ The Shrine	April 19, 2008	N/A	N/A
116	KOTC: Twisted	April 5, 2008	N/A	N/A
115	KOTC: Tsunami II	March 27, 2008	San Manuel Casino	Highland, California
114	KOTC: Protege	March 22, 2008	Avi Resort & Casino	Laughlin, Nevada
113	KOTC: All Wisconsin Fight Quest	March 15, 2008	Lake of the Torches	Lac du Flambeau, Wisconsin
112	KOTC: Stand Off	February 22, 2008	Soaring Eagle Casino	Mt. Pleasant, MI
111	KOTC: Warlords	February 9, 2008	Ute Mountain Casino	Towaoc, Colorado
110	KOTC: Premiere	January 24, 2008	San Manuel Casino	Highland, California
109	KOTC: Sub Zero	January 12, 2008	Lake of the Torches	Lac du Flambeau, Wisconsin

== KOTC: Sub Zero ==
KOTC: Sub Zero was an event held on January 12, 2008, at Lake of the Torches in Lac du Flambeau, Wisconsin.

=== Results ===
Main Card
Weight class				Method	Round	Time	Notes
	Héctor Urbina	def.	Herbert Goodman	Decision (Unanimous)	3	3:00
	Matt Jaggers	def.	Leon Tyree	TKO (Punches)	1	1:29
	Mike Sixel	def.	Jeremy Hemmrich	Submission (Punches)	1	1:20
	Josh Barnes	def.	Ismael Ponchero	Submission (Punches)	1	1:12
	Justin Krumplitsch	def.	Anthony Graham	Submission (Rear-Naked Choke)	1	1:03
	Sam Alvey	def.	Rodney Sleepers	Decision (Unanimous)	3	3:00
	Mikey Bennett	def.	Jimmy Zidek	Submission (Rear-Naked Choke)	1	0:55
	Jamie Johnson	def.	Brian Doe	Submission (Rear-Naked Choke)	1	0:18
	Josh Barnes	def.	Kevin Wilke	Submission (Punches)	1	0:19

== KOTC: Premiere ==
KOTC: Premiere was an event held on January 24, 2008, at San Manuel Casino in Highland, California.

=== Results ===
Main Card
Weight class				Method	Round	Time	Notes
Junior Welterweight	Joe Camacho	def.	Thomas Denny	KO (Punches)	2	0:37	(Note: For the King of the Cage Junior Welterweight Championship.)
	Buddy Clinton	def.	Gabe Rivas	Submission (Armbar)	1	2:04
	Richard Dalton	def.	Don Rocco	Decision (Unanimous)	3	5:00
	Tony Lopez	def.	John Brock	Submission (Rear-Naked Choke)	3	3:33
	Ricky Legere Jr.	def.	Fortino Sanchez	KO (Punches)	1	0:56
	William Sriyapai	def.	Alex Richard	KO (Punches)	1	3:29

== KOTC: Warlords ==
KOTC: Warlords was an event held on February 9, 2008, at Ute Mountain Casino in Towaoc, Colorado.

=== Results ===
Main Card
Weight class				Method	Round	Time	Notes
	Abel Cullum	def.	Zach Jenkins	Submission (Rear Naked Choke)	1	0:00
	Blue Edwards	def.	Brad Nordquist	Submission (Rear Naked Choke)	2	0:00
	Gerald Lovato	def.	Mike Clark	Submission (Rear Naked Choke)	3	0:00
	Eric Buck	def.	Joseph Rubio	Submission (Triangle Choke)	1	0:00
	Donald Sanchez	def.	R Romero	Submission (Armbar)	2	0:00
	Ray Mendoza	def.	William Campbell	TKO	1	0:00
	Josh Barnes	def.	Jayson Bedker	TKO	1	0:00
	Jacob Clark	def.	Santana-Sol Martinez	Submission (Triangle Choke)	1	0:00
	Jasper Church	def.	Miguel Lopez	Submission (Rear Naked Choke)	1	0:00
	Jeff Watson	def.	Richard Killingbeck	Submission (Armbar)	1	0:00
	Josh Edwards	def.	Brad Huket	TKO	1	0:00

== KOTC: Stand Off ==
KOTC: Stand Off was an event held on February 22, 2008, at The Soaring Eagle Casino in Mt. Pleasant, MI.

=== Results ===
Main Card
Weight class				Method	Round	Time	Notes
Bantamweight	Matt Jaggers	def.	Joe Voisin	Decision (Unanimous)	5	0:00	(Note: For the King of the Cage Bantamweight Championship.)
	Brad Burrick	def.	Jerome Beal	KO	1	1:43
	Bryan Harper	def.	Chad Herrick	KO	3	0:43

== KOTC: All Wisconsin Fight Quest ==
KOTC: All Wisconsin Fight Quest was an event held on March 15, 2008, at Lake of the Torches in Lac du Flambeau, Wisconsin.

== KOTC: Protege ==
KOTC: Protege was an event held on March 22, 2008, at The Avi Resort & Casino in Laughlin, Nevada.

=== Results ===
Main Card
Weight class				Method	Round	Time	Notes
	Anthony Guerra	def.	Ernie Calma	TKO (Punches)	1	2:21
	Jeremy Bennett	def.	Jeff Torch	Submission (Choke)	1	2:50
	Neil Cooke	def.	Jason Lane	Submission (Rear-Naked Choke)	1	1:17
	Victor Rodarte	def.	Daniel Shestack	Submission (Rear-Naked Choke)	1	1:24
	Greg Guzman	def.	Miguel Esparza	Decision (Unanimous)	3	5:00
	Angelo McLeroy	def.	Eric Saavedra	TKO (Punches)	1	0:35
	Patrick Ayala	vs.	Geno Salomone	Draw	3	5:00
	Peter Dominguez	def.	Nick Woods	TKO (Punches)	1	2:21
	Sean Strickland	def.	Tyler Pottett	Submission (Rear-Naked Choke)	2	1:53
	Junior Kling	def.	Ron Jeter	TKO (Punches)	1	2:31
	Archie Thompson	def.	Jason Squyer	TKO (Punches)	1	0:32
	Ryan Huff	def.	Daniel Rodriguez	TKO (Punches)	2	2:35

== KOTC: Tsunami II ==
KOTC: Tsunami II was an event held on March 27, 2008, at The San Manuel Casino in Highland, California.

=== Results ===
Main Card
Weight class				Method	Round	Time	Notes
Welterweight	Aaron Wetherspoon (c)	def.	John Mahlow	TKO	3	1:09	(Note: For the King of the Cage Welterweight Championship.)
	Reggie Orr	def.	Paul Arras	Submission (Verbal)	1	2:08
	Ricky Legere Jr.	def.	Gabe Lara	TKO	1	1:09
	William Sriyapai	def.	Alex Richard	TKO	1	4:36
	Lucas Taber	def.	Miguel Cosio	TKO	2	2:27
	Mike Robles	def.	Danny Navarro	KO	2	0:17
	Charles Evan Thompson	def.	Chris Krebs	Decision (Unanimous)	3	0:00
	Jayson Durant	def.	Lamar Jiles	TKO	1	1:08

== KOTC: Twisted ==
KOTC: Twisted was an event held on April 5, 2008.

== KOTC: Fight Nite @ The Shrine ==
KOTC: Fight Nite @ The Shrine was an event held on April 19, 2008.

=== Results ===
Main Card
Weight class				Method	Round	Time	Notes
	Fernando Gonzalez	def.	Héctor Urbina	Submission (Guillotine Choke)	1	2:10
	Tony Lopez	def.	Wade Hamilton	Submission (Punches)	1	1:52
	Mike Robles	def.	Dominic Verdugo	Submission (Arm-Triangle Choke)	3	4:04
	Michael Guymon	def.	Chris Moore	TKO (Punches)	2	1:52
	Steve Grode	def.	Buckley Acosta	TKO (Punches)	3	2:21
	Jesus Morales	def.	Bradley Moore	Submission (Punches)	1	2:52
	Jimmy Guyton	def.	David Aguirre	Decision (Unanimous)	3	3:00
	William Richey	def.	Abner Aponte	Submission (Rear-Naked Choke)	1	1:12
	Brian Abram	def.	John Ulloa	KO (Punches)	1	1:17

== KOTC: Opposing Force ==
KOTC: Opposing Force was an event held on May 15, 2008, at The San Manuel Casino in Highland, California.

=== Results ===
Main Card
Weight class				Method	Round	Time	Notes
Welterweight	Aaron Wetherspoon (c)	vs.	Anthony Lapsley	No Contest	2	0:00	(Note: For the King of the Cage Welterweight Championship.)
	Donald Sanchez	def.	William Sriyapai	TKO	2	3:41
	Mike Bourke	vs.	Chance Williams	No Contest	1	0:00
	Ben Fuimaono	def.	Miguel Cosio	Submission (Armbar)	2	2:11
	Tony Lopez	def.	Joey Beltran	Submission (Kimura)	1	3:15
	Gregg Dalton	def.	Dave Rivas	KO	2	3:41
	Georgi Karakhanyan	def.	Armando Sanchez	Decision (Unanimous)	3	5:00
	Daniel Hernandez	def.	Daniel Mancha	TKO	1	1:10

== KOTC: Reckless ==
KOTC: Reckless was an event held on May 17, 2008, at The Harlow's Casino Resort in Greenville, Mississippi.

=== Results ===
Main Card
Weight class				Method	Round	Time	Notes
Flyweight	Abel Cullum	def.	Ryan Diaz	Submission (Armbar)	5	1:27	(Note: For the King of the Cage Flyweight Championship.)
	Ovince St. Preux	def.	Todd Smart	KO (Punches)	1	1:28
	Mitch Lyons	def.	Tim Galluzzi	Decision (Unanimous)	3	3:00
	Jarrett Becks	def.	J.C. Pennington	Decision (Unanimous)	3	5:00
	Chris Gates	def.	Will Whilow	TKO (Punches)	2	1:58
	Mike Perez	def.	Jason Goodin	Submission (Rear-Naked Choke)	1	2:57
	Brian White	def.	Johnny Hughes	TKO (Doctor Stoppage)	1	2:22
	Wes Shivers	def.	Carlton Little	Submission (Rear-Naked Choke)	1	1:53
	Josh Robertson	def.	William Dazel	TKO (Punches)	2	1:36
	Eric Turner	def.	Rodney Sleepers	DQ (Illegal Knee)	2	2:00
	Ovince St. Preux	def.	Mike Cormier	Submission (Rear-Naked Choke)	1	2:59
	Todd Smart	def.	Jason Mitchell	Submission (Keylock)	1	1:36
	Mo Proctor	def.	Perry Williams	Submission (Armbar)	1	1:20
	Tim Galluzzi	def.	Ben Kristonis	Submission (Armbar)	1	1:28
	Mitch Lyons	def.	Dan Laubacher	TKO (Punches)	1	1:46

== KOTC: Rising Stars ==
KOTC: Rising Stars was an event held on May 24, 2008, at Kiowa Casino in Devol, Oklahoma.

=== Results ===
Main Card
Weight class				Method	Round	Time	Notes
	Bubba Mcdaniel	def.	Alex Cisne	TKO	2	2:37
	Kirk Gibson	def.	Christian Sanchez	Submission (Rear Naked Choke)	1	0:40
	Rex Richards	def.	Jeremy Carver	Submission (Rear Naked Choke)	1	1:23

== KOTC: Smashing Machine ==
KOTC: Smashing Machine was an event held on May 31, 2008, at Ute Mountain Casino in Towaoc, Colorado.

=== Results ===
Main Card
Weight class				Method	Round	Time	Notes
	Floyd Sword	def.	George Hernandez	Submission (Shoulder Lock)	1	2:14
	Gerald Sedillo	def.	Nathan Randall	Submission (Rear-Naked Choke)	1	1:21
	Levi Stout	def.	Manuel Otero	TKO (Punches)	1	3:56
	Joshua Montoya	def.	John Incorvaia	Submission (Shoulder Lock)	1	0:55
	Cris Leyva	def.	Ricardo Morales	TKO (Punches)	1	4:27
	Isaque Martinez	def.	Robert Montiel	KO (Punches)	1	1:22
	Victor Alcontor	def.	Jeremy Madrid	TKO (Punches)	1	2:08
	Jacob Clark	def.	Mike Clark	Submission (Rear-Naked Choke)	1	2:12
	Jerome Griego	def.	Josh Peterson	Submission (Shoulder Lock)	1	1:12
	Jasper Church	def.	Carlos Henri	TKO (Punches)	2	N/A
	Tommy Richardson	def.	Richard Killing	Submission (Armbar)	1	1:33
	Cody East	def.	Blair Silversmith	KO (Punches)	1	0:56
	Grant Birtcher	def.	Eugene Rodriguez	TKO (Punches)	1	2:16
	Byron Hacket	vs.	Senon Sandoval	Draw	2	5:00
	Jessie Williamson	def.	William Cambel	KO (Punch)	1	0:24

== KOTC: Settlement ==
KOTC: Settlement was an event held on June 13, 2008, at The Soaring Eagle Casino in Mount Pleasant, Michigan.

=== Results ===
Main Card
Weight class				Method	Round	Time	Notes
Bantamweight	Lazar Stojadinovic	def.	Matt Jaggers (c)	TKO (Punches)	3	0:21	(Note: For the King of the Cage Bantamweight Championship.)
	Terry Davinney	def.	Chad Herrick	TKO (Punches)	1	2:12
	Angelo Popofski	def.	Brad Burrick	Submission (Rear-Naked Choke)	2	1:10
	Myles Jury	def.	Joshua Taibl	TKO (Punches)	1	1:20
	Rodney Sleepers	def.	Charles Cosens	Submission (Guillotine Choke)	2	2:46

== KOTC: Badlands ==
KOTC: Badlands was an event held on July 12, 2008, at The Isleta Casino in Albuquerque, New Mexico.

=== Results ===
Main Card
Weight class				Method	Round	Time	Notes
	Chad Herrick	def.	Tait Fletcher	KO (Punches)	1	N/A
	Donald Sanchez	def.	Titus Holmes	Submission (Rear-Naked Choke)	1	3:14
	Michelle Waterson	def.	Thricia Poovey	TKO (Corner Stoppage)	2	5:00
	Manuel Otero	def.	Dicky Chavez	Submission (Rear-Naked Choke)	1	1:26
	Lance Friedenstein	def.	Doug Smith	TKO (Punches)	1	N/A
	Jacob Clark	def.	Mike Clark	Submission (Rear-Naked Choke)	1	2:12
	Gerald Sedillo	def.	Mike Clark	Submission (Rear-Naked Choke)	1	N/A
	Quinn Mulhern	def.	Jeremy Ferguson	Decision (Split)	3	3:00
	Brandon Hunt	def.	Reggie Mitchell	Decision (Split)	3	3:00
	Isaac Vallie-Flagg	def.	Brad Nordquist	TKO (Punches)	2	0:50
	Angelo Sanchez	def.	Mike Alirez	Submission (Armbar)	2	2:54
	Lorenzo Coca	def.	Josh Silva	Submission (Armbar)	1	1:16
	Abel Vargas	def.	William Knight	TKO (Punches)	1	2:50

== KOTC: Rock Solid ==
KOTC: Rock Solid was an event held on July 19, 2008, at The Lake of the Torches Casino in Lac du Flambeau, Wisconsin.

=== Results ===
Main Card
Weight class				Method	Round	Time	Notes
Heavyweight	Tony Lopez	def.	Wes Combs	Submission (Kimura)	2	2:59	(Note: For the King of the Cage Heavyweight Championship.)
	Sam Alvey	def.	Shane Malchiodi	Submission (Kimura)	2	1:19
	Tim Bradley	def.	Jeremy Hemmrich	Submission (Rear-Naked Choke)	1	1:13
	Brandon Delprado	def.	Rocky France	Decision (Unanimous)	3	3:00
	Billy Mitchell	def.	Mike Sixel	Submission (Guillotine Choke)	1	0:43
	Stephanie Schneider	def.	Beth Hintza	TKO (Punches)	1	0:35
	Brandon Buell	def.	Brent Martin	Submission (Rear-Naked Choke)	1	2:16
	Michael Abbott	def.	Travis Larson	Submission (Rear-Naked Choke)	1	2:43
	Rob Galloway	def.	Ryan Huff	Decision (Unanimous)	3	3:00
	Cody Smith	def.	Jordan Winski	Submission (Armbar)	1	0:46
	Sean Henry Barnett	def.	Shane Cadotte	Submission (Armbar)	1	0:43
	Ryan White	def.	Dave Hipke	KO (Punch)	1	2:02
	Jimmy Zidek	def.	Brandan Lawson	Decision (Split)	3	3:00
	Brandon Delprado	def.	Justin Krumplitsch	Submission (Rear-Naked Choke)	2	2:28
	Rocky France	def.	Rodney Sleepers	TKO (Punches)	2	1:53

== KOTC: Bio Hazard ==
KOTC: Bio Hazard was an event held on August 14, 2008, at The San Manuel Casino in Highland, California.

=== Results ===
Main Card
Weight class				Method	Round	Time	Notes
Welterweight	Anthony Lapsley	def.	Aaron Wetherspoon (c)	Submission (Scarf Hold Armlock)	1	1:34	(Note: For the King of the Cage Welterweight Championship.)
Junior Welterweight	Victor Valenzuela	def.	Joe Camacho (c)	TKO (Punch to the Body)	2	2:14	(Note: For the King of the Cage Junior Welterweight Championship.)
	Michael Guymon	def.	James Fanshier	TKO (Punches)	1	2:54
	Ricky Legere Jr.	def.	Daniel Hernandez	Submission (Rear-Naked Choke)	2	2:01
	Mike Robles	def.	R.J. Clifford	Decision (Majority)	3	3:00
	David Aguirre	def.	John Ulloa	Decision (Unanimous)	3	3:00
	Chris Culley	def.	Ernie Calma	TKO (Punches)	2	2:19
	Marcos Gonzalez	def.	Daniel Huynh	Submission (Rear-Naked Choke)	2	2:01

== KOTC: Retribution ==
KOTC: Retribution was an event held on August 30, 2008, at The Ute Mountain Casino in Cortez, Colorado.

=== Results ===
Main Card
Weight class				Method	Round	Time	Notes
	Lance Friedenstein	def.	Dave Paxton	Submission	1	0:46
	Joe Coca	def.	Jasper Church	Submission (Rear-Naked Choke)	1	3:26
	Levi Stout	def.	Brad Nordquist	Submission	1	0:36
	Rylan Sandoval	def.	Ambrose Teasyatwho	Submission (Guillotine Choke)	1	1:09
	Cris Leyva	def.	Daniel Armendariz	TKO (Punches)	1	1:37
	Matt Knaub	def.	Travis Ford	Submission	1	1:16
	Tarry Yezzi	def.	Josh Alloway	Submission (Guillotine Choke)	1	1:07
	Jacob Clark	def.	Robert Jeffers	Submission (Rear-Naked Choke)	1	0:49
	Gerald Sedillo	def.	Aaron Gustavo	Submission (Guillotine Choke)	1	0:23
	Jason Keith	def.	Jose Lujan	TKO (Corner Stoppage)	1	3:00

== KOTC: Cage Masters ==
KOTC: Cage Masters was an event held on October 4, 2008, at The Avi Resort and Casino in Laughlin, Nevada.

=== Results ===
Main Card
Weight class				Method	Round	Time	Notes
	Greg Guzman	def.	John Mccally	Submission (Armbar)	1	1:20
	Ernie Perea	def.	Troy McDaniel	KO (Knee)	1	0:27
	Matt Muramoto	def.	Ty Gilstrap	Submission (Rear Naked Choke)	2	0:31
	Ernie Calma	def.	Ron Jeter	Submission (Armbar)	1	0:26
	Neil Cooke	def.	Jason Squyer	TKO	1	0:10
	Uber Gallegos	def.	Jeff Torch	Submission (Strikes)	1	2:57
	Jonathan Brandon	def.	Rick Campbell	KO	3	0:18
	Jason Weiss	def.	Bill Kearin	TKO	1	1:11
	Ramon Contreras	def.	Jose Portocarrero	Submission (Kimura)	1	1:59
	Bret Russel	def.	Nicholas Gallegos	Submission (Triangle Choke)	2	1:18
	Josh Iuli	def.	Archie Thompson	KO	1	0:20
	Scotty Merrit	def.	Jason Youseph	TKO	1	0:00

== KOTC: Misconduct ==
KOTC: Misconduct was an event held on October 16, 2008, at The San Manuel Casino in Highland, California.

=== Results ===
Main Card
Weight class				Method	Round	Time	Notes
Light Heavyweight	Tony Lopez	def.	Fernando Gonzalez	Submission (Rear-Naked Choke)	2	1:37	(Note: For the King of the Cage Light Heavyweight Championship.)
	Ricky Legere Jr.	def.	James Fanshier	Decision (Unanimous)	3	5:00
	Ben Lagman	def.	Miguel Cosio	Submission (Rear Naked Choke)	1	2:11
	Dave Rivas	def.	Brent Medley	Submission (Rear Naked Choke)	2	2:52
	Tony Hervey	def.	Gabe Rivas	TKO (Doctor Stoppage)	1	0:00
	Brian Warren	def.	Erik Meaders	Decision (Unanimous)	3	5:00
	Alex Cisne	def.	Patrick Speight	Decision (Unanimous)	3	5:00
	Jimmy Stormo	def.	David Vessup	Decision (Unanimous)	3	5:00

== KOTC: Level One ==
KOTC: Level One was an event held on October 18, 2008, at The Lake of the Torches Casino in Lac du Flambeau, Wisconsin.

=== Results ===
Main Card
Weight class				Method	Round	Time	Notes
	Herbert Goodman	def.	Marcus Reynolds	Decision (Unanimous)	3	3:00
	Myles Jury	def.	Darrell Mitchell	TKO (Punches)	1	0:57

== KOTC: Frost Bite ==
KOTC: Frost Bite was an event held on November 7, 2008, at The Kewadin Casino in Sault Ste. Marie, Michigan.

=== Results ===
Main Card
Weight class				Method	Round	Time	Notes
	Eric Schelanberger	def.	Jeremy Wingler	Decision (Split)	3	3:00
	Brent Fryia	def.	Luis Alvarado	TKO (Punches)	0	N/A

== KOTC: Bragging Rights ==
KOTC: Bragging Rights was an event held on November 20, 2008, at The Ohio Expo Center Coliseum in Columbus, Ohio.

== KOTC: Anticipation ==
KOTC: Anticipation was an event held on November 26, 2008, at The Soaring Eagle Casino in Mount Pleasant, Michigan.

=== Results ===
Main Card
Weight class				Method	Round	Time	Notes
Middleweight	Brandon Hunt	def.	Brad Burrick	Decision (Unanimous)	5	3:00	(Note: For The King of the Cage Middleweight Championship.)
	Myles Jury	def.	Marcus Ajian	Submission (Punches)	1	0:49
	Ben Lagman	def.	Calvin Hamilton	TKO (Punches)	1	1:38
	Chad Herrick	def.	Mike O'Neil	Submission (Rear Naked Choke)	1	1:50
	Mike Bogner	def.	Mark Lichti	Submission (Rear Naked Choke)	1	0:55
	Andre Garcia	def.	Scott Bickerstaff	KO	2	2:16

== KOTC: Goodfellas ==
KOTC: Goodfellas was an event held on December 6, 2008, at The Isleta Casino in Albuquerque, New Mexico.

=== Results ===
Main Card
Weight class				Method	Round	Time	Notes
Flyweight	Abel Cullum (c)	def.	Brett Roller	Submission (Rear-Naked Choke)	1	1:47	(Note: For the King of the Cage Flyweight Championship.)
Bantamweight	Angelo Sanchez	def.	Tony Hervey	Decision (Split)	5	5:00	(Note: For the King of the Cage Bantamweight Championship.)
	Donald Sanchez	def.	Nathan Randall	TKO (Punches)	1	4:41
	Thricia Poovey	def.	Natasha Creger	Submission (Armbar)	1	1:43
	Alberto Crane	def.	Brad Nordquist	Submission (Rear-Naked Choke)	1	1:19
	Quinn Mulhern	def.	Manuel Otero	Submission (Rear-Naked Choke)	1	1:55
	Adam Oakey	def.	Carlos Lopez	TKO (Punches)	1	1:38
	Mike Maestas	def.	Donnie Martinez	Submission (Rear-Naked Choke)	1	2:37
	Felipe Chavez	def.	Daniel Armendariz	Submission (Guillotine Choke)	1	2:42

== KOTC: Prowler ==
KOTC: Prowler was an event held on December 11, 2008, at The San Manuel Casino in Highland, California.

=== Results ===
Main Card
Weight class				Method	Round	Time	Notes
Welterweight	Michael Guymon	def.	Anthony Lapsley (c)	Submission (Arm-Triangle Choke)	5	3:37	(Note: For the King of the Cage Welterweight Championship.)
	Brian Warren	def.	Victor Valenzuela	Decision (Unanimous)	3	5:00
	Waachiim Spiritwolf	def.	Ricky Legere Jr.	KO (Punch)	2	0:16
	Aaron Miller	def.	Brian Abram	Decision (Unanimous)	3	5:00
	Dave Cryer	def.	Andrew Jones	TKO (Cut)	1	0:00
	Yosuke Koreeda	def.	Anthony Guerra	KO (Punch)	1	0:21
	Dominic Verdugo	def.	Julio Sotomayor	Decision (Split)	3	5:00
	John Ulloa	def.	Johnny Gomez	TKO (Punches)	1	2:00
	Fernando Bernstein	def.	Vincent Martinez	Submission (Triangle Choke)	2	2:46

== See also ==
- List of King of the Cage events
- List of King of the Cage champions
