= Marius Žaromskis =

Lithuanian mixed martial artist

- Born: July 30, 1980 (age 46); Šiauliai, Lithuania
- Other names: Raging Demon, The Whitemare
- Nationality: Lithuanian
- Height: 5 ft 9 in (175 cm)
- Weight: 170 lb (77 kg; 12 st 2 lb)
- Division: Welterweight (170 lb)
- Reach: 69 in (175 cm)
- Stance: Southpaw
- Fighting out of: San Jose, California, United States
- Team: MMA Bushido (2000–2001); London Shootfighters (2001–2010); American Kickboxing Academy (2010–present)
- Rank: First dan black belt in Kyokushin Karate; Third Kyu Green Belt in Kickboxing; Blue belt in Brazilian jiu-jitsu
- Years active: 2000–2024

Mixed martial arts record
- Total: 35
- Wins: 23
- By knockout: 17
- By submission: 1
- By decision: 5
- Losses: 11
- By knockout: 6
- By decision: 5
- No contests: 1

Other information
- Mixed martial arts record from Sherdog

Marius Žaromskis (born July 30, 1980) is a Lithuanian retired professional mixed martial artist who competed in the Lightweight and Welterweight divisions. A professional competitor for over 24 years, Zaromskis formerly competed for Strikeforce, Cage Rage, Bellator, DREAM, and also fought at Dynamite!! 2010. Žaromskis won the DREAM 2009 Welterweight Grand Prix and became their inaugural Welterweight Champion.

== Mixed martial arts career ==
=== Early career ===
Žaromskis began martial arts at around the age of 15 or 16 years old with Kyokushin Karate and kickboxing, becoming a National Youth Champion of Lithuania at both styles. Later he also took up Muay Thai before finally transitioning into mixed martial arts. He made his professional mixed martial arts debut in 2000 at age of 19, at the Knight of the Ring 6 event. Zarosmkis won his first fight against Viktoras Kontrimas and lost his second fight against Ricardas Jancevicius at that event. Žaromskis returned after five years in Essex, England, at UKMMAC 13 against Jack Mason and won by technical knockout.

=== Cage Rage ===
With a 3–1 MMA record, Žaromskis joined the Cage Rage organization in May 2006, with his first fight against Afnan Saheed. After a big combination of knees and punches from Žaromskis, the referee stopped the fight. After his successful Cage Rage debut, Žaromskis fought against Che Mills, and the fight was competitive until Mills caught Žaromskis with a knee that knocked him out. After that loss, Žaromskis returned against Dariusz Świerkosz at Cage Rage: Contenders 3 and won by submission in the first round. His next opponent was Damien Riccio, and Žaromskis knocked him down several times, but Riccio survived. In round three Žaromskis won by TKO due to a cut on Riccio's face. It is one of the most impressive fights in Cage Rage history. After his crushing victory over Riccio, Žaromskis fought Ross Mason. Žaromskis completely dominated Mason in the first two rounds and knocked him out in the third round with a flying knee. Zaromskis next opponent was Ross Pointon. The fight looked competitive in the first round, but in the second round Pointon received a large cut on his head, causing a referee stoppage, which declared Žaromskis the winner. After this series of wins, Žaromskis received a title shot at the Cage Rage British Welterweight Championship and avenge his only loss in Cage Rage fighting against Che Mills for a second time. Žaromskis dominated the first round by taking him down two times and holding top positions for most of the round, but developed a cut on his right eye during the first round and doctors stopped the fight declaring Mills the winner. Zaromskis fought for the company a total of seven times until May 2008 when it was bought by EliteXC who soon fell into bankruptcy, meaning Cage Rage ceased operations. Zaromskis had compiled a Cage Rage record of 5–2.

=== Return to Lithuania ===
After leaving Cage Rage, Žaromskis returned to fight in Lithuania. He participated in Bushido Lithuania: Hero's 2008 event against Jedrzej Kubski. Kubski desperately tried to take the fight to the ground, and Žaromskis got on top by using his takedown defense. After landing multiple unanswered punches from the top, the referee stopped the fight. With an MMA record of 9–3, all wins finished by knockout or submission, Žaromskis was the most promising Lithuanian fighter.

=== DREAM ===
In April 2009, Žaromskis was invited to participate in the DREAM Welterweight Grand Prix 2009 Tournament. At DREAM 8 Zaromskis faced Seichi Ikemoto in the quarterfinals. Žaromskis out-struck him all three rounds, earning a unanimous decision victory. In the semifinals Žaromskis faced Hayato "Mach" Sakurai, who had just come off a KO victory over WAMMA Lightweight Champion Shinya Aoki in the previous round of the tournament. A heavy underdog in the fight, Žaromskis looked comfortable exchanging with the seasoned veteran. The two exchanged relatively evenly on the feet, both showing good combinations with their straight jabs and hooks, whilst Sakurai favored leg kicks and Žaromskis chose to use high kicks while working the body with his feet. Sakurai landed one takedown and assumed the half guard position in the middle of the ring, but Žaromskis was swiftly able to rise to his feet. The bout was then temporarily halted for several minutes to clean up a cut on Sakurai's face. When the bout resumed Žaromskis came out with a renewed intensity and after a brief exchange he landed a left high kick that dropped his opponent. Žaromskis followed with punches on the ground, prompting the referee to stop the fight for the TKO victory at 4:03 of the first round. Now in the final, Žaromskis faced Jason High who had defeated Andre Galvao previously that night in the other semifinal bout. Žaromskis again won in spectacular fashion, knocking out his opponent with a head kick at 2:22 of the first round crowning him the 2009 Welterweight Grand Prix Champion and the inaugural DREAM Welterweight Champion.

At DREAM 12, the event which marked the first time DREAM used a hexagonal cage for instead of a ring, Žaromskis met Korean Myeon Ho Bae in a non-title fight. Coming out from the opening bell aggressively, Žaromskis was caught by a right hand which backed him up for a few seconds until connecting a flush left high kick to the head of his opponent at 0:19 of the first round to knockout his opponent. It marked his third consecutive win via KO in just the first round.

Žaromskis successfully defended his DREAM Welterweight Championship against Kazushi Sakuraba at Dynamite!! 2010 on December 31, 2010. The fight was stopped early into the first round by doctors when it appears Žaromskis' strikes had partially torn Sakuraba's ear from his head.

Žaromskis was set to fight at DREAM 17 in a rematch with Hayato Sakurai, in a non-title fight, but an unspecified leg injury forced Sakurai out of the bout and he was replaced by Eiji Ishikawa. Ishikawa had won his last seven of nine fights before facing Žaromskis. Ishikawa was out-struck for almost all three rounds and was almost finished several times, but he was able to survive, eventually losing a unanimous decision.

=== Strikeforce ===
It was announced on October 31 that Žaromskis had signed a multi fight contract with North American promotion Strikeforce and would still be under contract for DREAM as well due to the organizations' alliance.

Žaromskis had five wins in a row, including the previous three via head kick KO. For this, he earned a fight against Nick Diaz for the inaugural Strikeforce Welterweight Championship at Strikeforce: Miami on January 30, 2010. After rocking Diaz earlier, Žaromskis ran into a straight right hand and lost via TKO at 4:38 of round one.

Žaromskis next fought Evangelista Santos at Strikeforce: Los Angeles. From the start of the fight, it was obvious that Cyborg had a size advantage over Žaromskis. Žaromskis lost by TKO at 2:38 in the first round.

After this, Žaromskis faced Waachiim Spiritwolf at Strikeforce Challengers: Wilcox vs. Ribeiro. Žaromskis started aggressive by attempting a flying knee, but as a result he accidentally poked Spiritwolf's eye and he was unable to continue resulting in a NC.

=== Bellator MMA ===
On February 24, 2012, it was announced that Žaromskis had signed a multi-fight deal with Bellator. In his first fight for the promotion, Žaromskis faced Waachiim Spiritwolf in a rematch. Spiritwolf weighed in a-pound-and-a-half overweight and was therefore forced to forfeit part of his purse. Once again, the contest between the two ended in controversy as the doctor stopped the fight between rounds two and three due to a cut suffered by Spiritwolf, giving Žaromskis the TKO win.

Due to the controversial nature of this stoppage, Žaromskis and Waachiim Spiritwolf had a rematch – the third fight between the two – at Bellator 72. He won the fight via split decision.

Zaromskis then faced Canadian contender Nordine Taleb at Bellator 74 in the first round of the new Welterweight Tournament on September 28, 2012, in Atlantic City, New Jersey. He won the fight via unanimous decision. In the semifinals, Zaromskis was TKO'd in the first round of his bout against Andrey Koreshkov.

Zaromskis entered the Bellator Season Eight Welterweight Tournament opening round against Brent Weedman. He lost via unanimous decision.

After over a year away from the sport, Zaromskis returned to Bellator and faced Vaughn Anderson at Bellator 119 on May 9, 2014. He won the fight via unanimous decision.

Žaromskis was expected to face Karo Parisyan on October 3, 2014, at Bellator 127. However, Žaromskis was pulled from the bout to fight at another date, as a result, Parisyan faced Fernando Gonzalez.

Žaromskis faced Fernando Gonzalez at Bellator 132 on January 16, 2015. He lost the fight by unanimous decision.

=== Post-Bellator career ===
After the seven-fight stint in Bellator and a four-year hiatus from professional MMA competition, Žaromskis faced Aliaksandr Danilchenko at Bushido FC: Bushido Vilnius 2019 on May 3, 2019. He won the fight via first-round knockout.

Žaromskis then signed a contract with KSW and was scheduled to make his promotional debut against Roberto Soldić at KSW 53 on March 21, 2020. However, the event was cancelled due to the COVID-19 pandemic and the bout was scrapped.

Žaromskis faced Andrzej Grzebyk at KSW 56 on November 14, 2020. Marius won the fight after Andrzej broke his leg on a checked kick, rendering him unable to continue.

Žaromskis rematched Andrzej Grzebyk on July 17, 2021, at KSW 62: Kołecki vs. Szostak. He lost the bout via TKO in the first round.

Žaromskis returned three years later to face Maciej Jewtuszko in a retirement bout for both men on March 16, 2024 at KSW 92: Wikłacz vs. Jojua, losing the bout via unanimous decision.

== Championships and Accomplishments ==
- DREAM

- DREAM Welterweight Championship (One time, last)
- 2009 DREAM Welterweight Grand Prix Champion

- Fight Matrix
  - 2009 Most Lopsided Upset of the Year vs. Hayato Sakurai on July 20

== Mixed martial arts record ==
Professional record breakdown
35 matches	23 wins	11 losses
By knockout	17	6
By submission	1	0
By decision	5	5
No contests	1	

Res.	Record	Opponent	Method	Event	Date	Round	Time	Location	Notes
Loss	23–11 (1)	Maciej Jewtuszko	Decision (unanimous)	KSW 92: Wikłacz vs. Jojua	March 16, 2024	3	5:00	Gorzów Wielkopolski, Poland	Retirement Fight
Loss	23–10 (1)	Andrzej Grzebyk	KO (punches)	KSW 62: Kołecki vs. Szostak	July 17, 2021	1	2:11	Warsaw, Poland	
Win	23–9 (1)	Andrzej Grzebyk	TKO (leg injury)	KSW 56: Materla vs. Soldić	November 14, 2020	1	4:58	Łódź, Poland	
Win	22–9 (1)	Aliaksandr Danilchenko	TKO (punches)	MMA Bushido 77 – Fighting Championship in Vilnius	May 3, 2019	1	2:05	Vilnius, Lithuania	
Loss	21–9 (1)	Fernando Gonzalez	Decision (unanimous)	Bellator 132	January 16, 2015	3	5:00	Temecula, California	
Win	21–8 (1)	Vaughn Anderson	Decision (unanimous)	Bellator 119	May 9, 2014	3	5:00	Rama, Canada	
Loss	20–8 (1)	Brent Weedman	Decision (unanimous)	Bellator 86	January 24, 2013	3	5:00	Thackerville, Oklahoma, United States	Bellator Season Eight Welterweight Tournament Quarterfinal.
Loss	20–7 (1)	Andrey Koreshkov	KO (punches)	Bellator 78	October 26, 2012	1	2:14	Dayton, Ohio, United States	Bellator Season Seven Welterweight Tournament Semifinal.
Win	20–6 (1)	Nordine Taleb	Decision (unanimous)	Bellator 74	September 28, 2012	3	5:00	Atlantic City, New Jersey, United States	Bellator Season Seven Welterweight Tournament Quarterfinal.
Win	19–6 (1)	Waachiim Spiritwolf	Decision (split)	Bellator 72	July 20, 2012	3	5:00	Tampa, Florida, United States	
Win	18–6 (1)	Waachiim Spiritwolf	TKO (doctor stoppage)	Bellator 68	May 11, 2012	2	5:00	Atlantic City, New Jersey, United States	Catchweight (172 lb) bout.
Win	17–6 (1)	Bruno Carvalho	KO (somersault kick, elbows and punches)	Rumble of the Kings	November 26, 2011	1	4:59	Stockholm, Sweden	
Win	16–6 (1)	Eiji Ishikawa	Decision (unanimous)	DREAM: Japan GP Final	July 16, 2011	2	5:00	Tokyo, Japan	Catchweight (175 lb) bout.
Loss	15–6 (1)	Jordan Mein	Decision (unanimous)	Score Fighting Series: Mein vs. Zaromskis	June 10, 2011	3	5:00	Mississauga, Canada	
Win	15–5 (1)	Kazushi Sakuraba	TKO (doctor stoppage)	Dynamite!! 2010	December 31, 2010	1	2:16	Saitama, Japan	Defended the DREAM Welterweight Championship.
NC	14–5 (1)	Waachiim Spiritwolf	No contest	Strikeforce Challengers: Wilcox vs. Ribeiro	November 19, 2010	1	0:06	Jackson, Mississippi, United States	Accidental eye poke by Žaromskis rendered Spiritwolf unable to continue.
Loss	14–5	Evangelista Santos	TKO (punches)	Strikeforce: Los Angeles	June 16, 2010	1	2:38	Los Angeles, California, United States	
Loss	14–4	Nick Diaz	KO (punch)	Strikeforce: Miami	January 30, 2010	1	4:38	Sunrise, Florida, United States	For the Strikeforce Welterweight Championship.
Win	14–3	Ho Bae Myeong	KO (head kick)	DREAM 12	October 25, 2009	1	0:19	Osaka, Japan	Non-title bout.
Win	13–3	Jason High	KO (head kick)	DREAM 10	July 20, 2009	1	2:22	Saitama, Japan	2009 DREAM Welterweight Grand Prix Final; won the inaugural DREAM Welterweight Championship.
Win	12–3	Hayato Sakurai	KO (head kick and punches)	DREAM 10	July 20, 2009	1	4:03	Saitama, Japan	2009 DREAM Welterweight Grand Prix Semifinal.
Win	11–3	Seichi Ikemoto	Decision (unanimous)	DREAM 8	April 5, 2009	2	5:00	Nagoya, Japan	2009 DREAM Welterweight Grand Prix Quarterfinal.
Win	10–3	Jedrzej Kubski	KO (punches)	Bushido Lithuania: Hero's 2008	November 8, 2008	1	0:50	Vilnius, Lithuania	
Loss	9–3	Che Mills	TKO (doctor stoppage)	Cage Rage 26	May 10, 2008	1	5:00	London, England	For the Cage Rage British Welterweight Championship.
Win	9–2	Ross Pointon	TKO (doctor stoppage)	Cage Rage 24	December 1, 2007	2	3:39	London, England	
Win	8–2	Ross Mason	KO (flying knee)	Cage Rage 22	July 14, 2007	3	2:03	England	
Win	7–2	Damien Riccio	TKO (Head kick & punches)	Cage Rage 20	February 10, 2007	3	4:30	London, England	
Win	6–2	Dariusz Świerkosz	Submission (triangle choke)	Cage Rage Contenders 3	November 12, 2006	2	N/A	London, England	
Loss	5–2	Che Mills	KO (knee)	Cage Rage Contenders 2	August 20, 2006	1	4:49	South London, England	
Win	5–1	Afnan Saheed	TKO (punches)	Cage Rage Contenders	May 28, 2006	1	1:21	London, England	
Win	4–1	Scott Pickering	KO (head kick)	Cage Warriors 20:Enter the Wolfslair	March 5, 2006	2	1:35	London, England	
Win	3–1	Kazys Grigaliunas	KO (punches)	ZT: Fight Night	February 19, 2006	1	1:57	London, England	
Win	2–1	Jack Mason	KO (Punches)	UKMMAC 13: Warriors Return	November 27, 2005	1	3:18	Essex, England	
Loss	1–1	Ricardas Jancevicius	Decision (unanimous)	Knight of the Ring 6	February 4, 2000	3	5:00	Šiauliai, Lithuania	
Win	1–0	Viktoras Kontrimas	KO (Head kick)	Knight of the Ring 6	February 4, 2000	2	0:23	Šiauliai, Lithuania	

== Submission grappling record ==
Result	Opponent	Method	Event	Date	Round	Time	Notes
Draw	(Poland) Marcin Held	Draw	Quintet	April 11, 2018	1	10:00	

== See also ==
- List of male mixed martial artists

New championship	1st Dream Welterweight Champion; July 20, 2009–present	Current holder
