= Lorenz Larkin =

American mixed martial arts (MMA) fighter

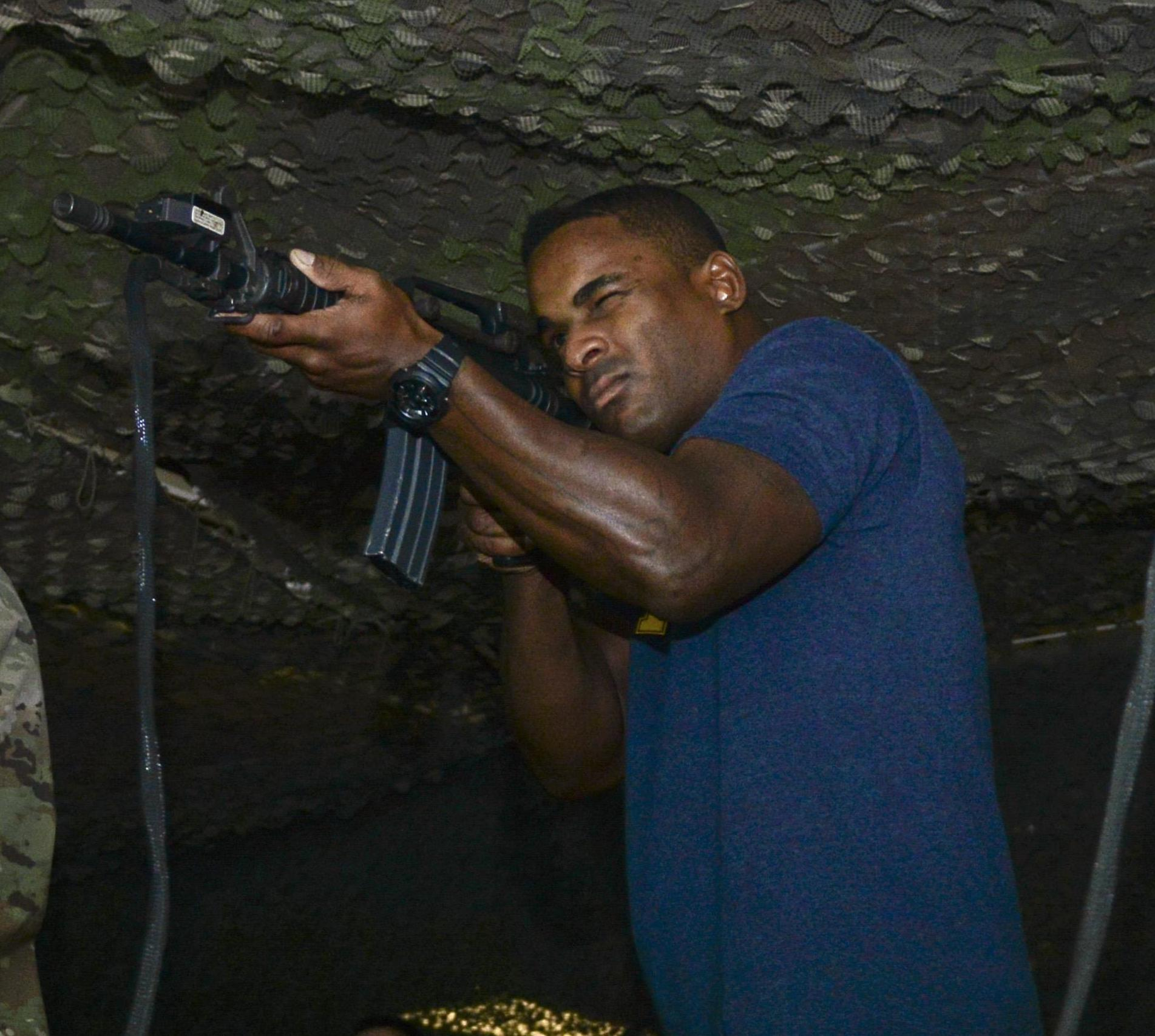
- Born: September 3, 1986 (age 40); Riverside, California, United States
- Other names: The Monsoon
- Height: 5 ft 11 in (1.80 m)
- Weight: 170 lb (77 kg; 12 st 2 lb)
- Division: Heavyweight (2009–2010); Light Heavyweight (2010–2012); Middleweight (2012–2015, 2021–2022); Welterweight (2015–present)
- Reach: 72 1/2 in (184 cm)
- Style: Kickboxing, Kung Fu, BJJ
- Fighting out of: Riverside, California, United States
- Team: Millennia MMA Gym
- Rank: Purple belt in Brazilian Jiu-Jitsu
- Years active: 2009–present

Mixed martial arts record
- Total: 37
- Wins: 27
- By knockout: 15
- By decision: 12
- Losses: 8
- By knockout: 2
- By decision: 6
- No contests: 2

Other information
- Mixed martial arts record from Sherdog

Lorenz Larkin (born September 3, 1986) is an American professional mixed martial artist who formerly competed in the Welterweight division of Bellator MMA. A professional competitor since 2009, Larkin formerly competed for Strikeforce and the Ultimate Fighting Championship (UFC).

== Background ==
Larkin was born and raised in Riverside, California as one of nine siblings. Larkin began training in boxing at a young age and also played football, but soon gave it up because he did not excel at it or other team sports. He attended Riverside Polytechnic High School. Afterwards, he continued boxing but was not able to compete as much as he would like to, due to his father's objections. Larkin also felt that he was too short to be a professional boxer in the heavyweight division, so he took up kickboxing and Brazilian jiu-jitsu which led him to mixed martial arts. Prior to his career in mixed martial arts, Larkin also trained in Kung Fu. In an interview, Larkin stated he enjoyed the martial arts movies that were popular around the time he was growing up and wanted to be a Kung Fu fighter.

== Mixed martial arts career ==
=== Early career ===
Larkin holds records of 5–0 and 10–0 in amateur boxing and amateur mixed martial arts, respectively, with one of those wins coming against UFC Heavyweight Walt Harris. Making his professional MMA debut in August 2009, he compiled an undefeated record of 12–0.

=== Strikeforce ===
Larkin made his debut in the Strikeforce promotion on April 1, 2011, against kickboxer Scott Lighty at Strikeforce Challengers: Wilcox vs. Damm, replacing Satoshi Ishii on a week's notice. Larkin won the fight via technical knockout in the second round and earned praise for his impressive performance against a veteran fighter, while being largely unheard of himself.

Larkin returned to the promotion in June 2011. He faced Gian Villante and won the fight via unanimous decision. Villante controlled the first round from top position but Larkin turned it around in the second round by keeping the fight on the feet and landing many strong kicks to the legs of his opponent. Larkin kept this up in the third round while also scoring an unexpected takedown in the last ten seconds.

Larkin was originally scheduled to headline the next challengers event against Virgil Zwicker but Zwicker pulled out due to an injury. Larkin instead faced Nick Rossborough and won the fight via unanimous decision.

Larkin next faced Muhammed Lawal at Strikeforce: Rockhold vs. Jardine. He lost the fight via KO in the second round, the first loss of his professional career. However, the result was overturned and changed to a No Contest after Lawal tested positive for steroids (Drostanolone).

For his next fight, Larkin dropped down to Middleweight division. He faced heavy-handed future UFC welterweight champion Robbie Lawler on July 14, 2012, at Strikeforce: Rockhold vs. Kennedy. He won the fight via unanimous decision.

Larkin was to challenge Luke Rockhold for the championship on November 3, 2012, at Strikeforce: Cormier vs. Mir. The event was to be held at the Chesapeake Energy Arena in Oklahoma City, Oklahoma, but was cancelled in October 2012. The fight was rescheduled and set to take place on January 12, 2013. However, Rockhold once again pulled out of the fight due to injury. Larkin was then scheduled to face Ronaldo Souza, but the fight never materialized.

=== Ultimate Fighting Championship ===
In January 2013, the Strikeforce organization was closed by its parent company Zuffa. A list of fighters scheduled to be brought over to the Ultimate Fighting Championship was released in mid-January and Larkin was one of the fighters listed.

On February 9, 2013, the UFC announced that Larkin would make his debut against Francis Carmont at UFC on Fox: Henderson vs. Melendez in San Jose, California. He lost the fight due to a controversial unanimous decision with many major MMA media scoring the fight as a win for Larkin.

For his second UFC appearance, Larkin faced Chris Camozzi on November 6, 2013, at UFC Fight Night 31. He won the fight via unanimous decision.

Larkin faced Brad Tavares on January 15, 2014, at UFC Fight Night 35. He lost the fight via unanimous decision.

Larkin faced Costas Philippou at UFC Fight Night 40. He lost the back-and-forth fight via knockout in the first round.

Larkin was expected to face Derek Brunson at UFC 176. However, after UFC 176 was cancelled, Larkin/Brunson was rescheduled and eventually took place on August 30, 2014, at UFC 177. Larkin lost the fight by unanimous decision.

For his next fight, Larkin moved down to the welterweight division. He faced John Howard on January 18, 2015, at UFC Fight Night 59. Larkin won the fight via TKO in the first round. The performance also earned Larkin his first Performance of the Night bonus award.

Larkin faced Santiago Ponzinibbio on June 27, 2015, at UFC Fight Night 70. Larkin won the fight via TKO in the second round and earned a Fight of the Night bonus.

Larkin faced Albert Tumenov on January 2, 2016, at UFC 195. He lost the back-and-forth fight by split decision.

Larkin faced Jorge Masvidal on May 29, 2016, at UFC Fight Night 88. He won the back-and-forth fight via split decision.

Larkin faced Neil Magny on August 20, 2016, at UFC 202. He won the bout via TKO in the first round, after hurting his opponent with leg kicks and finishing the fight with elbows.

=== Bellator MMA ===
In March 2017, Larkin announced he had signed a multi-fight deal with Bellator MMA.

In his debut, Larkin faced welterweight champion Douglas Lima at Bellator NYC on June 24, 2017. He lost the fight via unanimous decision.

In his second fight for the promotion, Larkin faced British striker Paul Daley on September 23, 2017, at Bellator 183. Despite a good first round where he stunned Daley multiple times, He went on to lose the fight via knockout in the second round.

Larkin faced Fernando Gonzalez in a catchweight bout at Bellator 193 on January 26, 2018. He won the fight via unanimous decision.

Larkin was expected to face Erick Silva at Bellator 207. On October 1, 2018, news surfaced that Silva pulled out of the fight due to an injury, and he was replaced by Ion Pascu. He won the fight via unanimous decision.

Larkin was expected to headline Bellator 219 against Andrey Koreshkov on March 29, 2019, but withdrew from the fight due to an injury. The bout with Koreshkov eventually headlined Bellator 229 on October 4, 2019. Larkin won the back-and-forth bout via split decision.

Larkin faced Keita Nakamura at Bellator & Rizin: Japan on December 29, 2019. He won the fight by unanimous decision.

Larkin was scheduled to face Costello van Steenis in a middleweight bout at Bellator 258 on May 7, 2021. On April 27, it was announced that van Steenis suffered an injury during training and pulled out of the bout. On May 1, former Bellator Middleweight World Champion Rafael Carvalho was announced as a replacement. Larkin won the bout via split decision.

Larkin was scheduled to fight Khalid Murtazaliev on May 6, 2022 at Bellator 280. However at the end of March, Murtazaliev pulled out of the bout and was replaced by Anthony Adams. Adams in turn pulled out as well and was replaced by UFC vet Kyle Stewart. Larkin won the bout within the first round, landing multiple knees to the body and punches on Stewart while he was on the ground.

Returning to Welterweight, Larkin faced Mukhamed Berkhamov on July 22, 2022 at Bellator 283. Half way through the first round, Larkin landed an elbow on the back of Berkhamov's head, resulting in him not being able to continue. The bout was declared a no contest.

The rematch of the no contest against Mukhamed Berkhamov took place on February 4, 2023 at Bellator 290. Larkin knocked out Berkhamov with an elbow off the clinch in the first round.

Larkin faced Andrey Koreshkov on July 30, 2023 at Bellator MMA x Rizin 2. He lost the bout via split decision.

Larkin made his PFL debut against Alan Dominguez at PFL 6 (2024) on June 28, 2024, winning the fight via TKO in the first round.

Larken next returned to Bellator to face Levan Chokheli in a Bellator Welterweight title eliminator on September 7, 2024 at Bellator Champions Series 4, winning the fight via TKO in the first round.

On November 20, 2024, it was reported that Larkin had completed his contract with PFL/Bellator.

=== Global Fight League ===
Larkin was scheduled to face Carlos Petruzzella on May 25, 2025 at GFL 2. However, all GFL events were cancelled indefinitely.

=== Most Valuable Promotions ===
Larkin was scheduled to face former Bellator Welterweight Champion Jason Jackson on May 16, 2026, at MVP MMA 1. However, Larkin pulled out due to an injury and was replaced by Jefferson Creighton.

== Championships and accomplishments ==
- Mez Sports MMA
  - MSMMA Light Heavyweight Championship (One time)
- Ultimate Fighting Championship
  - Fight of the Night (One time) vs. Santiago Ponzinibbio
  - Performance of the Night (One time) vs. John Howard

== Mixed martial arts record ==
Professional record breakdown
37 matches	27 wins	8 losses
By knockout	15	2
By decision	12	6
No contests	2	

Res.	Record	Opponent	Method	Event	Date	Round	Time	Location	Notes
Win	27–8 (2)	Levan Chokheli	KO (punches)	Bellator Champions Series 4	September 7, 2024	1	1:53	San Diego, California, United States	Bellator Welterweight title eliminator.
Win	26–8 (2)	Alan Dominguez	TKO (knee and punches)	PFL 6 (2024)	June 28, 2024	1	4:46	Sioux Falls, South Dakota, United States	
Loss	25–8 (2)	Andrey Koreshkov	Decision (split)	Bellator MMA x Rizin 2	July 30, 2023	3	5:00	Saitama, Japan	
Win	25–7 (2)	Mukhamed Berkhamov	KO (elbow)	Bellator 290	February 4, 2023	1	1:41	Inglewood, California, United States	
NC	24–7 (2)	Mukhamed Berkhamov	NC (illegal elbow)	Bellator 283	July 22, 2022	1	2:52	Tacoma, Washington, United States	Return to Welterweight. An accidental illegal elbow rendered Berkhamov unable to continue.
Win	24–7 (1)	Kyle Stewart	TKO (knees and punches)	Bellator 280	May 6, 2022	1	4:44	Paris, France	
Win	23–7 (1)	Rafael Carvalho	Decision (split)	Bellator 258	May 7, 2021	3	5:00	Uncasville, Connecticut, United States	Return to Middleweight.
Win	22–7 (1)	Keita Nakamura	Decision (unanimous)	Bellator & Rizin: Japan	December 29, 2019	3	5:00	Saitama, Japan	Catchweight (173.5 lb) bout; Larkin missed weight.
Win	21–7 (1)	Andrey Koreshkov	Decision (split)	Bellator 229	October 4, 2019	3	5:00	Temecula, California, United States	
Win	20–7 (1)	Ion Pascu	Decision (unanimous)	Bellator 207	October 12, 2018	3	5:00	Uncasville, Connecticut, United States	
Win	19–7 (1)	Fernando Gonzalez	Decision (unanimous)	Bellator 193	January 26, 2018	3	5:00	Temecula, California, United States	Catchweight (180 lbs) bout.
Loss	18–7 (1)	Paul Daley	KO (punches)	Bellator 183	September 24, 2017	2	2:40	San Jose, California, United States	
Loss	18–6 (1)	Douglas Lima	Decision (unanimous)	Bellator NYC	June 24, 2017	5	5:00	New York City, New York, United States	For the Bellator Welterweight World Championship.
Win	18–5 (1)	Neil Magny	TKO (elbows)	UFC 202	August 20, 2016	1	4:08	Las Vegas, Nevada, United States	
Win	17–5 (1)	Jorge Masvidal	Decision (split)	UFC Fight Night: Almeida vs. Garbrandt	May 29, 2016	3	5:00	Las Vegas, Nevada, United States	
Loss	16–5 (1)	Albert Tumenov	Decision (split)	UFC 195	January 2, 2016	3	5:00	Las Vegas, Nevada, United States	
Win	16–4 (1)	Santiago Ponzinibbio	TKO (punches)	UFC Fight Night: Machida vs. Romero	June 27, 2015	2	3:07	Hollywood, Florida, United States	Fight of the Night.
Win	15–4 (1)	John Howard	TKO (punches)	UFC Fight Night: McGregor vs. Siver	January 18, 2015	1	2:17	Boston, Massachusetts, United States	Welterweight debut. Performance of the Night.
Loss	14–4 (1)	Derek Brunson	Decision (unanimous)	UFC 177	August 30, 2014	3	5:00	Sacramento, California, United States	
Loss	14–3 (1)	Costas Philippou	KO (punches)	UFC Fight Night: Brown vs. Silva	May 10, 2014	1	3:47	Cincinnati, Ohio, United States	
Loss	14–2 (1)	Brad Tavares	Decision (unanimous)	UFC Fight Night: Rockhold vs. Philippou	January 15, 2014	3	5:00	Duluth, Georgia, United States	
Win	14–1 (1)	Chris Camozzi	Decision (unanimous)	UFC: Fight for the Troops 3	November 6, 2013	3	5:00	Fort Campbell, Kentucky, United States	
Loss	13–1 (1)	Francis Carmont	Decision (unanimous)	UFC on Fox: Henderson vs. Melendez	April 20, 2013	3	5:00	San Jose, California, United States	
Win	13–0 (1)	Robbie Lawler	Decision (unanimous)	Strikeforce: Rockhold vs. Kennedy	July 14, 2012	3	5:00	Portland, Oregon, United States	Middleweight debut.
NC	12–0 (1)	Muhammed Lawal	NC (overturned)	Strikeforce: Rockhold vs. Jardine	January 7, 2012	2	1:32	Las Vegas, Nevada, United States	Originally a KO (punches) win for Lawal; overturned after he tested positive for drostanolone.
Win	12–0	Nick Rossborough	Decision (unanimous)	Strikeforce Challengers: Larkin vs. Rossborough	September 23, 2011	3	5:00	Las Vegas, Nevada, United States	
Win	11–0	Gian Villante	Decision (unanimous)	Strikeforce Challengers: Fodor vs. Terry	June 24, 2011	3	5:00	Kent, Washington, United States	
Win	10–0	Scott Lighty	TKO (punches)	Strikeforce Challengers: Wilcox vs. Damm	April 1, 2011	2	3:15	Stockton, California, United States	
Win	9–0	Mike Cook	TKO (punches)	MEZ Sports: Pandemonium 4	February 25, 2011	2	3:32	Riverside, California, United States	Non-title bout.
Win	8–0	Hector Carrillo	KO (head kick and punches)	MEZ Sports: Pandemonium 3	November 19, 2010	1	2:57	Los Angeles, California, United States	Won the MEZ Sports Light Heavyweight Championship.
Win	7–0	Rick Slaton	KO (punches)	MEZ Sports: Pandemonium 2	September 11, 2010	1	1:06	Riverside, California, United States	
Win	6–0	João Assis	KO (punches)	Respect in the Cage	July 24, 2010	1	1:43	Hollywood, California, United States	Light Heavyweight debut.
Win	5–0	Scott Carson	KO (punches)	MEZ Sports: Pandemonium at the Palladium	June 12, 2010	1	2:54	Los Angeles, California, United States	
Win	4–0	Rick Guillen	KO (punches)	Champion Promotions: Clash of the Gladiators 2	May 8, 2010	1	2:30	Palm Springs, California, United States	
Win	3–0	Mychal Clark	Decision (split)	Respect in the Cage 4	April 17, 2010	3	5:00	Pomona, California, United States	
Win	2–0	Giovanni Sarran	Decision (unanimous)	Chaos in the Cage 6	February 27, 2010	3	5:00	Lancaster, California, United States	
Win	1–0	Lateef Williams	KO (elbow)	Fist Series: SummerFist III	August 15, 2009	1	0:40	Irvine, California, United States	

== Karate Combat record ==
Professional record breakdown
2 matches	1 win	1 loss
By knockout	0	1
By decision	1	0

Res.	Record	Opponent	Method	Event	Date	Round	Time	Location	Notes
Loss	1–1	Vanilto Antunes	TKO (punches)	Karate Combat 58	5 December 2025	1	1:20	Doral, Florida, United States	
Win	1–0	Buddy Wallace	Decision (split)	Karate Combat 56	19 July 2025	3	3:00	Miami, Florida, United States	

== See also ==
- List of male mixed martial artists
