= UFC Fight Night: Brown vs. Silva =

UFC mixed martial arts event in 2014

- The poster for UFC Fight Night: Brown vs. Silva
- Promotion: Ultimate Fighting Championship
- Date: May 10, 2014
- Venue: U.S. Bank Arena
- City: Cincinnati, Ohio
- Attendance: 6,143
- Total gate: $415,000

Event chronology
UFC 172: Jones vs. Teixeira	UFC Fight Night: Brown vs. Silva	UFC 173: Barao vs. Dillashaw

UFC Fight Night: Brown vs. Silva (also known as UFC Fight Night 40) was a mixed martial arts event held on May 10, 2014, at the U.S. Bank Arena in Cincinnati, Ohio.

== Background ==
The event was the second time that the organization has held an event in Cincinnati, after UFC 77 back in 2007.

Alexander Yakovlev and Yan Cabral were originally scheduled to face each other in a welterweight bout. However, on April 9, Yakovlev was moved to The Ultimate Fighter Brazil 3 Finale card as he replaced an injured Mike Pierce against Demian Maia. Cabral instead faced Zak Cummings at the event.

William Macario was expected to face Neil Magny at the event. However, Macario was removed from the bout for undisclosed reasons and replaced by returning veteran Tim Means.

Anthony Lapsley initially weighed in at 174 pounds, over the welterweight limit allowance of 171 pounds. Lapsley was given an additional two hours to lose the weight. He successfully weighed in at 171 pounds two hours later.

This card featured the second most victories by fighters considered betting underdogs with eight, second only to UFC Fight Night 38 that featured eight underdog wins.

== Results ==
Main Card (Fox Sports 1)
Weight class				Method	Round	Time	Notes
Welterweight	Matt Brown	def.	Erick Silva	TKO (punches)	3	2:11
Middleweight	Costas Philippou	def.	Lorenz Larkin	KO (punch)	1	3:47
Lightweight	Daron Cruickshank	def.	Erik Koch	TKO (head kick and punches)	1	3:21
Welterweight	Neil Magny	def.	Tim Means	Decision (unanimous) (29–28, 29–28, 30–27)	3	5:00
Heavyweight	Soa Palelei	def.	Ruan Potts	KO (punches)	1	2:20
Flyweight	Chris Cariaso	def.	Louis Smolka	Decision (split) (28–29, 29–28, 29–28)	3	5:00
Preliminary card (Fox Sports 2)
Middleweight	Ed Herman	def.	Rafael Natal	Decision (unanimous) (30–27, 29–28, 29–28)	3	5:00
Flyweight	Kyoji Horiguchi	def.	Darrell Montague	Decision (unanimous) (30–27, 30–27, 29–28)	3	5:00
Welterweight	Zak Cummings	def.	Yan Cabral	Decision (unanimous) (29–28, 29–28, 29–28)	3	5:00
Bantamweight	Johnny Eduardo	def.	Eddie Wineland	KO (punches)	1	4:37
Preliminary card (UFC Fight Pass)
Featherweight	Nik Lentz	def.	Manny Gamburyan	Decision (unanimous) (30–27, 30–27, 30–27)	3	5:00
Lightweight	Justin Salas	def.	Ben Wall	KO (punches)	1	2:41
Welterweight	Albert Tumenov	def.	Anthony Lapsley	KO (punch)	1	3:56

== Bonus awards ==
The following fighters received $50,000 bonuses:

- Fight of the Night: Matt Brown vs. Erick Silva
- Performance of the Night: Matt Brown and Johnny Eduardo

== Reported payout ==
The following is the reported payout to the fighters as reported to the Ohio Athletic Commission. It does not include sponsor money and also does not include the UFC's traditional "fight night" bonuses.

- Matt Brown: $82,000 (includes $41,000 win bonus) def. Erick Silva: $22,000
- Costas Philippou: $46,000 (includes $23,000 win bonus) def. Lorenz Larkin: $28,000
- Daron Cruickshank: $24,000 (includes $12,000 win bonus) def. Erik Koch: $18,000
- Neil Magny: $20,000 (includes $10,000 win bonus) def. Tim Means: $10,000
- Soa Palelei: $32,000 (includes $16,000 win bonus) def. Ruan Potts: $10,000
- Chris Cariaso: $42,000 (includes $21,000 win bonus) def. Louis Smolka: $10,000
- Ed Herman: $80,000 (includes $40,000 win bonus) def. Rafael Natal: $26,000
- Kyoji Horoguchi: $20,000 (includes $10,000 win bonus) def. Darrel Montague: $8,000
- Zak Cummings: $16,000 (includes $8,000 win bonus) def. Yan Cabral: $10,000
- Johnny Eduardo: $16,000 (includes $8,000 win bonus) def. Eddie Wineland: $21,000
- Nik Lentz: $58,000 (includes $29,000 win bonus) def. Manvel Gamburyan: $25,000
- Justin Salas: $24,000 (includes $12,000 win bonus) def. Ben Wall: $8,000
- Albert Tumenov: $16,000 (includes $8,000 win bonus) def. Anthony Lapsley: $8,000

== See also ==
- List of UFC events
- 2014 in UFC
