= Herbert Goodman =

American mixed martial arts fighter (born 1977)

- Born: August 31, 1977 (age 49); Miami, Florida, U.S.
- Other names: Whisper
- Height: 6 ft 1 in (1.85 m)
- Weight: 185 lb (84 kg; 13.2 st)
- Division: Middleweight
- Reach: 75.0 in (191 cm)
- Fighting out of: Green Bay, Wisconsin, United States
- Team: Fox Valley Grappling Club
- Years active: 2007-2011

Mixed martial arts record
- Total: 30
- Wins: 19
- By knockout: 7
- By submission: 8
- By decision: 3
- By disqualification: 1
- Losses: 11
- By knockout: 3
- By submission: 2
- By decision: 6

Other information
- University: Graceland College
- Mixed martial arts record from Sherdog

Herbert Goodman (born August 31, 1977) is an American retired professional mixed martial artist and former NFL running back for the Green Bay Packers. A professional competitor from 2007 until 2011, Goodman competed for Bellator, M-1 Global and King of the Cage. He received his nickname, "Whisper" due to his soft-spoken personality.

== Background ==
Goodman was born and raised in Miami, Florida, attending Homestead High School where he competed in track and field, becoming a two-time letter winner in the sport and also placed third in the state long jump during his senior year. Goodman began playing football during his senior year of high school, and then continued with the sport for the two years 1998-1999 at Graceland College (NAIA) in Lamoni, Iowa, where he rushed for 2,385 yards before he was signed by the Green Bay Packers of the NFL as an undrafted free agent in 2000.

== NFL career ==
Goodman played two seasons in the National Football League (NFL) as a running back and kick returner for the Green Bay Packers, appearing in 12 games during the 2000 and 2001 seasons. He ran the ball four times for -3 yards and returned five kickoffs for 150 yards. He also fumbled twice. Goodman was allocated to NFL Europe in 2002 where he started for the Scottish Claymores, rushing for 873 yards to lead the league and also surpass Siran Stacy's single season team rushing record. After his stint in the NFL, Goodman also was a member of various teams' practice squads, played in the CFL, and also played semi-professionally in Wisconsin. He eventually retired in 2005 after suffering a knee injury in the CFL.

== Mixed martial arts career ==
=== Early career ===
Goodman started his professional mixed martial arts career in 2007. He fought Hector Lombard at Bellator 24 and lost via first-round KO.

=== Combat USA ===
Goodman fought Will Dicke in the Wisconsin State semifinals and won via unanimous decision to move on to the Wisconsin State finals. He fought Gerald Meerschaert in the Wisconsin State finals and won via submission (rear-naked choke) to become the Middleweight State Champion of Wisconsin.

Goodman was supposed to face Louis Taylor, the Middleweight State Champion of Illinois, on July 16, 2011 at Combat USA Wisconsin vs. Illinois but Taylor dropped out of the fight just 2 hours before the weigh-ins with a bruised leg.

== Mixed martial arts record ==
Professional record breakdown
| 30 matches | 19 wins | 11 losses |
| By knockout | 7 | 3 |
| By submission | 8 | 2 |
| By decision | 3 | 6 |
| By disqualification | 1 | 0 |

| Res. | Record | Opponent | Method | Event | Date | Round | Time | Location | Notes |
|---|---|---|---|---|---|---|---|---|---|
| Win | 19–11 | Jonas Billstein | DQ (illegal soccer kick) | Bellator 58 | November 19, 2011 | 2 | 3:21 | Hollywood, Florida, United States | |
| Loss | 18–11 | Isaiah Larson | Decision (unanimous) | Riot at the Hyatt: Packer vs. Viking | September 23, 2011 | 3 | 5:00 | Minneapolis, Minnesota, United States | |
| Win | 18–10 | Gerald Meerschaert | Submission (rear-naked choke) | Combat USA Fighting Championships | April 22, 2011 | 1 | 1:28 | Green Bay, Wisconsin, United States | |
| Win | 17–10 | Will Dicke | Decision (unanimous) | Combat USA: Best 8 in the State 2 | March 5, 2011 | 3 | 5:00 | Green Bay, Wisconsin, United States | |
| Loss | 16–10 | Forrest Petz | Decision (unanimous) | Ultimate Cage Battle: Pride & Glory | January 15, 2011 | 3 | 5:00 | Parma, Ohio, United States | |
| Loss | 16–9 | Hector Lombard | KO (punches) | Bellator 24 | August 12, 2010 | 1 | 0:38 | Hollywood, Florida, United States | |
| Win | 16–8 | Mike Suttles | TKO (punches) | CCFP: Cool City Fight Promotions | July 24, 2010 | 1 | 1:27 | Rockwood, Wisconsin, United States | |
| Loss | 15–8 | Jason Norwood | Decision (unanimous) | FCF: Freestyle Cage Fighting 43 | June 12, 2010 | 3 | 5:00 | Shawnee, Oklahoma, United States | |
| Win | 15–7 | Dante Rivera | Decision (unanimous) | Adrenaline: New Breed | February 26, 2010 | 3 | 5:00 | Atlantic City, New Jersey, United States | Won the vacant New Breed Fighters Middleweight Championship. |
| Win | 14–7 | David Kleczkowski | Submission (guillotine choke) | ECO: Extreme Cagefighting Organization 3 | January 16, 2010 | 1 | 1:19 | Baraboo, Wisconsin, United States | |
| Win | 13–7 | Chris Krueger | Submission (arm triangle choke) | IFC: Wiuff vs. Newcomb | January 8, 2010 | 1 | 0:58 | Green Bay, Wisconsin, United States | |
| Win | 12–7 | Joseph Reyes | Submission | MFC: Maximo Fighting Championship | November 28, 2009 | 1 | 1:28 | Isla Verde, Carolina | |
| Win | 11–7 | James Brasco | TKO (punches) | Shine Fights 2: ATT vs. The World | September 4, 2009 | 3 | 3:24 | Miami, Florida, United States | |
| Loss | 10–7 | Lucas Lopes | Decision (unanimous) | Headhunter Productions: The Patriot Act 2 | April 25, 2009 | 3 | 5:00 | Columbia, Missouri, United States | |
| Win | 10–6 | Jordan Radev | KO (punches) | M-1 Challenge: 2009 Selections 3 | March 28, 2009 | 2 | 4:59 | Bourgas, Bulgaria | |
| Loss | 9–6 | Ronald Stallings | KO (knees) | UWC 5: Man O' War | February 21, 2009 | 1 | 4:56 | Fairfax, Virginia, United States | |
| Win | 9–5 | Marcus Reynolds | Decision (unanimous) | KOTC: Level One | October 18, 2008 | 3 | 3:00 | Lac du Flambeau, Wisconsin, United States | |
| Loss | 8–5 | Mark Palbykin | Decision (unanimous) | CCC: Cage Conflict Championships | September 20, 2008 | 3 | 5:00 | Menasha, Wisconsin, United States | |
| Loss | 8–4 | Kenny Robertson | Submission (armbar) | Combat USA: Battle in the Bay 7 | May 20, 2008 | 3 | N/A | Green Bay, Wisconsin, United States | |
| Win | 8–3 | Adrian Serrano | KO | GFS: Thunderdome | May 17, 2008 | 2 | 1:02 | Wisconsin, United States | |
| Win | 7–3 | Roger Krahl | TKO (corner stoppage) | R.F.C. 1: Revolution Fight Club 1 | April 18, 2008 | 1 | 5:00 | Fort Lauderdale, Florida, United States | |
| Win | 6–3 | Andrew Urban | Submission (kimura) | KTK: Konquer the Kage 19 | March 29, 2008 | 3 | 2:20 | Oshkosh, Wisconsin, United States | |
| Win | 5–3 | Matt Scaggs | Submission (strikes) | TCC: Carnage in the Cage | February 23, 2008 | 1 | N/A | Green Bay, Wisconsin, United States | |
| Loss | 4–3 | Héctor Urbina | Decision (unanimous) | KOTC: Sub Zero | January 12, 2008 | 3 | 3:00 | Lac Du Flambeau, Wisconsin, United States | |
| Loss | 4–2 | Chris Baten | TKO | UWC 2: Ultimate Warrior Challenge | June 30, 2007 | 2 | 1:57 | Jacksonville, Florida, United States | |
| Win | 4–1 | Shane DeZee | Submission (guillotine choke) | MMAC: The Revolution | May 12, 2007 | 1 | 0:36 | DC Armory, Washington D.C. | |
| Loss | 3–1 | John Krohn | Submission (armbar) | SF 19: Cinco de Mayhem | May 5, 2007 | 3 | 2:10 | Portland, Oregon, United States | |
| Win | 3–0 | Eric Manley | TKO | KSP: Ken Shamrock Productions | April 21, 2007 | 2 | N/A | Redding, California, United States | |
| Win | 2–0 | Randall Lamonte | Submission (guillotine choke) | KSP: Fight at the Falls | March 3, 2007 | 1 | N/A | Oroville, California, United States | |
| Win | 1–0 | Tim Nixon | KO (punches) | Gladiators Fighting Series: Super Brawl | January 27, 2007 | 2 | 0:30 | United States | |
