= Fernando Gonzalez (fighter) =

American mixed martial arts fighter

- Born: Fernando Esparza Gonzalez; September 15, 1983 (age 43); Escondido, California, United States
- Other names: The Menifee Maniac
- Height: 5 ft 9 in (1.75 m)
- Weight: 170 lb (77 kg; 12 st)
- Division: Light Heavyweight; Middleweight; Welterweight
- Reach: 68.0 in (173 cm)
- Fighting out of: Menifee, California, United States
- Team: Next Generation
- Years active: 2003–present

Kickboxing record
- Total: 2
- Wins: 1
- Losses: 1

Mixed martial arts record
- Total: 49
- Wins: 29
- By knockout: 10
- By submission: 8
- By decision: 11
- Losses: 20
- By knockout: 2
- By submission: 5
- By decision: 13

Other information
- Mixed martial arts record from Sherdog

Fernando Esparza Gonzalez (born September 15, 1983) is an American mixed martial artist who competes in the Welterweight division. A professional competitor since 2003, Gonzalez has also competed for the WEC, King of the Cage, Bellator MMA, Absolute Championship Akhmat, and Strikeforce. Also a successful competitor in Muay Thai, Gonzalez is the former WBC National Muay Thai Cruiserweight Champion.

== Background ==
Born in Escondido, California, Gonzalez began boxing at the age of five. During high school, Gonzalez competed in football and began training in mixed martial arts after graduating at the age of 19.

== Mixed martial arts career ==
=== Early career: WEC ===
Gonzalez made his MMA and WEC debut against Mike Castillo on October 17, 2003, at WEC 8. He was victorious via first-round TKO.

After going 7–3 in his next ten bouts, Gonzalez returned to the promotion when he faced Jimmy Dexter at WEC 20, defeating him via rear-naked choke submission.

He next faced Alex Stiebling at WEC 23 on August 17, 2006. He won the fight via TKO due to a doctor stoppage in the first round.

Gonzalez faced Brendan Seguin at WEC 25 on January 20, 2007. He lost the fight via unanimous decision.

In what would be his last fight for the promotion, Gonzalez faced Hiromitsu Miura at WEC 29 on August 5, 2007. He lost the fight via submission due to punches in the second round.

=== Strikeforce ===
Gonzalez made his Strikeforce debut at Strikeforce: Melendez vs. Masvidal on December 17, 2011. He faced Eddie Mendez and lost via split decision.

=== Bellator MMA ===
Gonzalez made his Bellator debut on July 25, 2014, when he faced Bellator season 6 welterweight tournament winner Karl Amoussou at Bellator 122. Despite coming in as an underdog, Gonzalez pulled off the upset, winning via unanimous decision.

In his second appearance for Bellator, Gonzalez was expected to face Justin Baesman at Bellator 127 on October 3, 2014. However, Karo Parisyan's opponent, Marius Žaromskis, was removed from their scheduled bout on the same card, so Gonzalez stepped in as a replacement. He won the fight via TKO in the first round. In his post-fight drug test, Gonzalez tested positive for Tetrahydrocannabinol (THC). As a result, Gonzalez was suspended for 30 days in the state of California by the CSAC and fined $315.

Gonzalez faced Marius Žaromskis at Bellator 132 on January 16, 2015. He won the fight by unanimous decision.

Gonzalez next faced Curtis Millender at Bellator 137 on May 15, 2015. He won the fight via submission in the third round, bringing his Bellator record to 4–0. After the fight it was revealed by the CSAC that Gonzalez tested positive for marijuana; his second violation while with the promotion.

On March 4, 2016, Gonzalez fought Gilbert Smith at Bellator 151. He won the fight by split decision.

Gonzalez fought Michael Page on November 19, 2016, at Bellator 165. He lost the fight via split decision.

After his first loss in the promotion, Gonzalez was scheduled to face former Bellator Welterweight Champion, Andrey Koreshkov, at Bellator 174 on March 3, 2017. However, an injury forced Koreshkov out of the bout. Instead, Gonzalez faced Brandon Girtz at the event and won via unanimous decision.

Gonzalez faced Brennan Ward at Bellator 182 on August 25, 2017. Originally a catchweight of 178 pounds, Gonzalez missed weight and came in at 180 pounds. He won the fight via a guillotine choke submission in the third round.

Gonzalez faced Lorenz Larkin in a catchweight bout at Bellator 193 on January 26, 2018. Gonzalez missed weight for the third time in a row. After surviving a late flurry of strikes in the third round, Gonzalez lost the fight via unanimous decision and was subsequently released from the promotion.

=== Post-Bellator ===
Gonzalez faced Gabriel Checco on March 9, 2019 at California Xtreme Fighting (CXF 17) and won by split decision.

Gonzalez faced Elias Silvério on June 8, 2019 at ACA 96 on and lost by unanimous decision.

Gonzalez faced Abubakar Vagaev on October 4, 2019 at ACA 100 and lost by unanimous decision.

Gonzalez faced Ty Freeman on May 29, 2021 at J Street Fights 1 and won by knockout in the third round.

Gonzalez faced Sidiah Parker on August 28, 2021 at NWFA 1: Retribution and lost by unanimous decision.

Gonzalez faced Maki Pitolo on March 4, 2022 at Tuff-N-Uff 127 and lost by unanimous decision.

== Bare-knuckle boxing ==
=== Bare Knuckle Fighting Championship ===
Gonzalez made his debut against Vincent Familari in a middleweight bout at BKFC: Knucklemania IV on April 27, 2024. He lost the bout by unanimous decision.

Gonzalez was scheduled to face Kyle McElroy at BKFC Fight Night 16 on July 12, 2024. McElroy was replaced by Rodney Thomas for unknown reasons. Gonzalez won the bout by unanimous decision.

Gonzalez was scheduled to face Erick Lozano on January 18, 2025 at BKFC Fight Night: Pechanga. However, the bout was cancelled for unknown reasons.

== Personal life ==
Gonzalez and his wife have children.

== Mixed martial arts record ==
Professional record breakdown
49 matches	29 wins	20 losses
By knockout	10	2
By submission	8	5
By decision	11	13

Res.	Record	Opponent	Method	Event	Date	Round	Time	Location	Notes
Loss	29–20	Maki Pitolo	Decision (unanimous)	Tuff-N-Uff 127	March 4, 2022	3	5:00	Las Vegas, Nevada, United States	
Loss	29–19	Sidiah Parker	Decision (unanimous)	NWFA 1: Retribution	August 28, 2021	3	5:00	Bentonville, Arkansas, United States	Catchweight (180 lb) bout.
Win	29–18	Ty Freeman	KO	J Street Fights 1	May 29, 2021	3	0:14	Bentonville, Arkansas, United States	
Loss	28–18	Abubakar Vagaev	Decision (unanimous)	ACA 100	October 4, 2019	3	5:00	Grozny, Russia	
Loss	28–17	Elias Silvério	Decision (unanimous)	ACA 96: Goncharov vs. Johnson	June 8, 2019	3	5:00	Łódź, Poland	Return to Welterweight.
Win	28–16	Gabriel Checco	Decision (split)	CXF 17: March Madness	March 9, 2019	3	5:00	Los Angeles, California, United States	Middleweight bout.
Loss	27–16	Piotr Strus	Decision (split)	ACB 87: Mousah vs Whiteford	May 19, 2018	3	5:00	Nottinghamshire, England	Middleweight bout.
Loss	27–15	Lorenz Larkin	Decision (unanimous)	Bellator 193	January 26, 2018	3	5:00	Temecula, California, United States	Catchweight (180 lbs) bout; Gonzalez missed weight.
Win	27–14	Brennan Ward	Submission (guillotine choke)	Bellator 182	August 25, 2017	3	1:02	Verona, New York, United States	Catchweight (180 lbs) bout; Gonzalez missed weight.
Win	26–14	Brandon Girtz	Decision (unanimous)	Bellator 174	March 3, 2017	3	5:00	Thackerville, Oklahoma, United States	Catchweight (174 lbs) bout; Gonzalez missed weight.
Loss	25–14	Michael Page	Decision (split)	Bellator 165	November 19, 2016	3	5:00	San Jose, California, United States	
Win	25–13	Gilbert Smith	Decision (split)	Bellator 151	March 4, 2016	3	5:00	Thackerville, Oklahoma, United States	
Win	24–13	Curtis Millender	Submission (guillotine choke)	Bellator 137	May 15, 2015	3	1:14	Temecula, California, United States	Gonzalez tested positive for marijuana metabolites in post-fight drug test.
Win	23–13	Marius Žaromskis	Decision (unanimous)	Bellator 132	January 16, 2015	3	5:00	Temecula, California, United States	
Win	22–13	Karo Parisyan	TKO (punches)	Bellator 127	October 3, 2014	1	1:43	Temecula, California, United States	Catchweight (173 lb) bout. Gonzalez tested positive for THC in his post-fight drug test.
Win	21–13	Karl Amoussou	Decision (unanimous)	Bellator 122	July 25, 2014	3	5:00	Temecula, California, United States	Welterweight bout.
Loss	20–13	David Mitchell	TKO (punches)	WFC 8: Avila vs. Berkovic	February 15, 2014	3	1:45	Sacramento, California, United States	
Loss	20–12	Max Griffin	Decision (split)	WFC 7: Griffin vs. Gonzalez	November 16, 2013	5	5:00	Sacramento, California, United States	For the interim WCFC Middleweight Championship.
Win	20–11	Kenny Ento	Decision (unanimous)	Gladiator Challenge: Showdown	May 25, 2013	3	5:00	Woodlake, California, United States	
Win	19–11	Lucas Gamaza	Decision (unanimous)	Red Canvas: Art of Submission 3	October 27, 2012	3	5:00	Stockton, California, United States	
Win	18–11	Theodore Whitfield	TKO (punches)	Gladiator Challenge	September 29, 2012	1	1:02	San Diego, California, United States	
Loss	17–11	Eddie Mendez	Decision (split)	Strikeforce: Melendez vs. Masvidal	December 17, 2011	3	5:00	San Diego, California, United States	
Loss	17–10	Joe Williams	Decision (split)	Respect in the Cage	June 4, 2011	5	5:00	Pomona, California, United States	For the RITC Middleweight Championship.
Loss	17–9	Brent Cooper	Decision (unanimous)	Respect in the Cage	April 23, 2011	3	5:00	Pomona, California, United States	
Win	17–8	Nick Zarate	TKO (punches)	Gladiator Challenge: Never Quit	November 8, 2009	1	0:47	San Jacinto, California, United States	
Win	16–8	Frank Avant	Submission (rear-naked choke)	Gladiator Challenge: High Impact	July 23, 2009	1	0:21	Pauma Valley, California, United States	
Loss	15–8	Tony Lopez	Submission (rear-naked choke)	KOTC: Storm	May 16, 2009	5	1:48	Lake Elsinore, California, United States	For the KOTC Light Heavyweight Championship.
Win	15–7	Larry Mays	TKO (elbows)	Gladiator Challenge: Venom	April 23, 2009	1	1:53	Pauma Valley, California, United States	
Loss	14–7	Tony Lopez	Submission (rear-naked choke)	KOTC: Misconduct	October 16, 2008	2	1:37	Highland, California, United States	Light Heavyweight debut. For the KOTC Light Heavyweight Championship.
Win	14–6	Hector Urbina	Submission (guillotine choke)	KOTC: Fight Nite @ The Shrine	April 19, 2008	1	2:10	Los Angeles, California, United States	Welterweight bout.
Loss	13–6	Jay Martinez	TKO (punches)	MMA Xtreme 15	November 16, 2007	2	3:11	Mexico City, Mexico	
Loss	13–5	Hiromitsu Miura	Submission (punches)	WEC 29	August 5, 2007	2	3:35	Las Vegas, Nevada, United States	
Win	13–4	Joe Atoe	TKO (punches)	MMA Xtreme 12	June 30, 2007	1	2:31	Mexicali, Mexico	
Win	12–4	Jay Carter	Decision (unanimous)	X-1: Extreme Fighting 2	March 17, 2007	3	3:00	Honolulu, Hawaii, United States	
Loss	11–4	Brendan Seguin	Decision (unanimous)	WEC 25	January 20, 2007	3	5:00	Las Vegas, Nevada, United States	
Win	11–3	Umar Luv	Submission (injury)	KOTC: Destroyer	December 1, 2006	2	0:28	San Jacinto, California, United States	
Win	10–3	Alex Stiebling	TKO (doctor stoppage)	WEC 23	August 17, 2006	1	2:35	Lemoore, California, United States	
Win	9–3	Jimmy Dexter	Submission (rear-naked choke)	WEC 20	May 5, 2006	1	4:09	Lemoore, California, United States	Return to Middleweight.
Loss	8–3	Danny Higgins	Submission (rear-naked choke)	Extreme Wars 2: X-1	March 18, 2006	2	N/A	Honolulu, Hawaii, United States	
Win	8–2	Ray Lizama	Decision (unanimous)	KOTC 63: Final Conflict	December 2, 2005	2	5:00	San Jacinto, California, United States	
Win	7–2	Aaron Torres	Submission (punches)	KOTC 58: Prime Time	August 5, 2005	1	1:33	San Jacinto, California, United States	
Win	6–2	Sidney Silva	Decision (unanimous)	Extreme Wars: X-1	July 2, 2005	3	5:00	Honolulu, Hawaii, United States	Return to Welterweight.
Loss	5–2	Miguel Gutierrez	Submission (armbar)	KOTC: Mortal Sins	May 7, 2005	1	1:42	Primm, Nevada, United States	
Win	5–1	Reggie Orr	Decision (majority)	KOTC 49: Soboba	March 20, 2005	2	5:00	San Jacinto, California, United States	Welterweight bout.
Win	4–1	Reggie Orr	Submission (injury)	KOTC 44: Revenge	November 14, 2004	2	2:38	San Jacinto, California, United States	
Win	3–1	Travis Goodman	KO (punch)	KOTC 41: Relentless	September 24, 2004	1	0:25	San Jacinto, California, United States	Return to Middleweight.
Win	2–1	Scott Sepulveda	TKO (punches)	KOTC 39: Hitmaster	August 6, 2004	1	3:28	San Jacinto, California, United States	Welterweight debut.
Loss	1–1	Eric Escobedo	Decision	Pit Fighting Championship	February 7, 2004	3	5:00	California, United States	
Win	1–0	Mike Castillo	TKO (punches)	WEC 8	October 17, 2003	1	1:27	Lemoore, California, United States	

== Kickboxing record ==
Kickboxing record
1 Win (0 (T)KO's), 1 Losses
Date	Result	Opponent	Event	Location	Method	Round	Time	Record
2015-09-19	Loss	(United Kingdom) Paul Daley	Bellator MMA & Glory: Dynamite 1	San Jose, California, US	Decision (unanimous)	3	3:00	0–1
2010-07-3	Win	(England) Smith Wellington	Extreme Brawling	USA	Decision (unanimous)	3		
Legend: Win Loss Draw/No contest Notes

== Bare knuckle boxing record ==
Professional record breakdown
2 matches	1 win	1 loss
By decision	1	1

Res.	Record	Opponent	Method	Event	Date	Round	Time	Location	Notes
Win	1–1	Rodney Thomas	Decision (unanimous)	BKFC Fight Night Pechanga: Peralta vs. Warr	July 12, 2024	5	2:00	Temecula, California, United States	
Loss	0–1	Vincent Familari	Decision (unanimous)	BKFC Knucklemania IV	April 27, 2024	5	2:00	Los Angeles, California, United States	
