= Héctor Urbina =

Mexican mixed martial arts fighter

- Born: September 17, 1987 (age 39); Monterrey, Nuevo León, México
- Other names: El Toro
- Height: 6 ft 0 in (1.83 m)
- Weight: 170 lb (77 kg; 12 st)
- Division: Heavyweight; Light Heavyweight; Middleweight; Welterweight
- Reach: 73.5
- Stance: Orthodox
- Fighting out of: Coconut Creek, Florida, United States
- Team: American Top Team
- Years active: 2006-2009; 2011-2017

Mixed martial arts record
- Total: 29
- Wins: 17
- By knockout: 9
- By submission: 5
- By decision: 2
- Unknown: 1
- Losses: 11
- By knockout: 7
- By submission: 2
- By decision: 2
- Draws: 1

Other information
- Mixed martial arts record from Sherdog

Héctor Urbina (born September 17, 1987) is a Mexican mixed martial artist. A professional since 2006 who last competed in 2018, he has fought in the UFC, Bellator, EliteXC, and King of the Cage.

== Mixed martial arts career ==
=== Early career ===
After compiling a 2–0 record as an amateur, Urbina made his professional MMA debut in September 2006. Over the first two years of his career, he amassed a record of 12-4 and fought for a number of promotions including King of the Cage, Elite XC, Icon Sport, and Extreme Challenge.

=== Bellator Fighting Championships ===
Urbina fought in the earliest years of Bellator Fighting Championships. He faced future champion Lyman Good on the organization's second event, Bellator 2, in April 2009 and lost by technical submission. He then faced Ira Boyd at Bellator 6 in May 2009 and won by TKO in the first round.

=== Ultimate Fighting Championship ===
After returning to the independent MMA scene where he amassed a record of 3 wins, 3 losses and 1 draw over the next five years, Urbina was signed by the Ultimate Fighting Championship. He made his debut at UFC 180 against Edgar Garcia on November 15, 2014. Despite being a significant underdog, Urbina defeated Garcia by submission in the first round.

Urbina was next scheduled to face Albert Tumenov at UFC 188. However, he pulled out of the bout due to an arm injury.

Urbrina returned to the Octagon against Bartosz Fabiński at The Ultimate Fighter Latin America 2 Finale on November 21, 2015. He lost the bout by unanimous decision.

Urbina was then scheduled to face George Sullivan at UFC on FOX 20. However, this bout was cancelled due to a USADA violation by Sullivan.

Urbina next faced Vicente Luque at UFC Fight Night: Cyborg vs. Länsberg on September 24, 2016. He lost the fight via knockout in the first round.

==== The Ultimate Fighter: Redemption ====
After a 1–2 run in the UFC, Urbina was announced as one of the fighters for The Ultimate Fighter: Redemption in February 2017. On the first episode, Urbina was picked fourth by Cody Garbrandt to be on his team. He was scheduled to face James Krause in the show's first fight. However, after two days of cutting weight, Urbina was unable to make the welterweight limit of 171 pounds, only getting down to 188.4 pounds. Ultimately, Urbina was removed from the bout and show and replaced by Johnny Nunez.

== Mixed martial arts record ==
Professional record breakdown
29 matches	17 wins	11 losses
By knockout	9	7
By submission	5	2
By decision	2	2
Unknown	1	0
Draws	1	

Res.	Record	Opponent	Method	Event	Date	Round	Time	Location	Notes
Loss	17–11–1	Dequan Townsend	KO (head kick)	New League Fights 7: Hallows Eve	October 28, 2017	1	1:16	Montpelier, Ohio, United States	Middleweight bout.
Loss	17–10–1	Vicente Luque	KO (punch)	UFC Fight Night: Cyborg vs. Länsberg	September 24, 2016	1	1:00	Brasília, Brazil	
Loss	17–9–1	Bartosz Fabiński	Decision (unanimous)	The Ultimate Fighter Latin America 2 Finale: Magny vs. Gastelum	November 21, 2015	3	5:00	Monterrey, Mexico	
Win	17–8–1	Edgar Garcia	Submission (guillotine choke)	UFC 180	November 15, 2014	1	3:38	Mexico City, Mexico	
Win	16–8–1	Nick Duell	TKO (punches)	NAAFS: Fight Night in the Flats 9	June 1, 2013	3	3:35	Cleveland, Ohio, United States	Return to Welterweight; won the NAAFS Welterweight Championship.
Loss	15–8–1	Tyler Beckley	TKO (doctor stoppage)	Purgatory FS 10: Purgatory Fight Series 10	December 7, 2012	1	1:32	Toledo, Ohio, United States	
Loss	15–7–1	Nissen Osterneck	Decision (split)	Warfare 6: Friday Night Fights	August 24, 2012	3	5:00	Myrtle Beach, South Carolina, United States	
Win	15–6–1	Travis Clark	Submission (guillotine choke)	NAAFS: Caged Fury 17	April 27, 2012	1	0:16	Morgantown, West Virginia, United States	Won the NAAFS Middleweight Championship.
Draw	14–6–1	Tomar Washington	Technical Draw (illegal elbows from Washington)	Warfare 4: Fight Night at the Palace	March 11, 2012	1	0:00	Myrtle Beach, South Carolina, United States	
Win	14–6	William Hill	TKO (punches)	AFA 6: Uprising	April 16, 2011	1	3:20	Fort Wayne, Indiana, United States	
Loss	13–6	Brendan Seguin	TKO (punches)	IFL: The Saint Valentine's Day Massacre	February 18, 2011	1	3:51	Auburn Hills, Michigan, United States	Return to Middleweight.
Win	13–5	Ira Boyd	TKO (arm injury)	Bellator 6	May 8, 2009	1	0:19	Robstown, Texas, United States	Catchweight (174 lbs) bout.
Loss	12–5	Lyman Good	Technical Submission (rear-naked choke)	Bellator 2	April 10, 2009	2	3:22	Uncasville, Connecticut, United States	
Win	12–4	David Kleczkowski	TKO (punches)	AMMA 1: Adrenaline MMA 1	June 14, 2008	2	1:19	Chicago, Illinois, United States	
Loss	11–4	Fernando Gonzalez	Submission (guillotine choke)	KOTC: Fight Nite at the Shrine	April 19, 2008	1	2:10	Los Angeles, California, United States	
Win	11–3	Herbert Goodman	Decision (unanimous)	KOTC: Sub Zero	January 12, 2008	3	3:00	Lac du Flambeau, Wisconsin, United States	Middleweight bout.
Win	10–3	Joe Kennedy	KO (punches)	KOTC: Damage Inc.	November 17, 2007	1	2:24	Rockford, Illinois, United States	
Win	9–3	Ray Lizama	Decision (unanimous)	ShoXC: Elite Challenger Series	August 25, 2007	3	5:00	Vicksburg, Mississippi, United States	Middleweight bout.
Win	8–3	Adrian Serrano	KO (punches)	KOTC: Damage Control	May 26, 2007	1	1:18	Chicago, Illinois, United States	Return to Welterweight.
Loss	7–3	Jason Miller	TKO (punches)	Icon Sport: Epic	March 31, 2007	1	1:11	Honolulu, Hawaii, United States	
Win	7–2	John Doyle	Submission (choke)	EC 74: Extreme Challenge 74	March 10, 2007	0	0:00	Iowa City, Iowa, United States	
Win	6–2	Jason Louck	N/A	EC 74: Extreme Challenge 74	March 10, 2007	N/A	N/A	Iowa City, Iowa, United States	
Loss	5–2	Adam Maciejewski	TKO (punches)	KOTC: Hard Knocks	January 19, 2007	1	2:50	Rockford, Illinois, United States	Heavyweight bout.
Win	5–1	Eli Moreno	TKO (punches)	FCFS 5: Full Contact Fight Series 5	December 15, 2006	1	0:42	Fort Wayne, Indiana, United States	
Win	4–1	Cedric James	Submission (rear-naked choke)	FOG: Fists of Glory	December 9, 2006	1	1:01	Richmond, Indiana, United States	
Win	3–1	Rudy Rosales	TKO (punches)	FCFS 4: Damage Control	November 19, 2006	1	1:32	Auburn, Indiana, United States	
Loss	2–1	Tim Kennedy	KO (punches)	FF 7: Fightfest 7	September 23, 2006	1	1:51	Cleveland, Ohio, United States	
Win	2–0	Shane Lightle	TKO (punches)	FCFS 3: Full Contact Fight Series	September 16, 2006	1	3:13	Auburn, Indiana, United States	
Win	1–0	Brian Brannon	Submission (rear-naked choke)	HHCF 27: Rumble at the Rodeo 2	September 2, 2006	1	1:16	Chillicothe, Ohio, United States	

=== Mixed martial arts amateur record ===
Amateur record breakdown		
2 matches	2 wins	0 losses
By knockout	1	0
By submission	1	0

Res.	Record	Opponent	Method	Event	Date	Round	Time	Location	Notes
Win	2–0	Travis Stout	TKO	NLF 5: Next Level Fighting 5	July 29, 2006	1	0:48	Steubenville, Ohio, United States	
Win	1–0	Jeremy Shimae	Submission (strikes)	UFS 2: Ultimate Fight Series 2	June 17, 2006	1	1:52	Auburn, Indiana, United States	

== See also ==
- List of Mexican UFC fighters
- List of male mixed martial artists
