= Mike Guymon =

American mixed martial arts fighter

Michael Guymon
- Born: Michael Kevin Guymon; September 17, 1974 (age 52); Newport Beach, California, U.S.
- Other names: The Joker
- Nationality: American
- Height: 6 ft 0 in (1.83 m)
- Weight: 155 lb (70 kg; 11.1 st)
- Division: Lightweight; Welterweight; Middleweight
- Fighting out of: Lake Forest, California
- Team: Jokers MMA
- Years active: 1999–2013

Mixed martial arts record
- Total: 22
- Wins: 15
- By knockout: 8
- By submission: 5
- By decision: 2
- Losses: 6
- By knockout: 1
- By submission: 4
- By decision: 1
- Draws: 1

Other information
- Mixed martial arts record from Sherdog

Michael Kevin Guymon (born September 17, 1974) is a retired American professional mixed martial artist who formerly competed in Bellator's Lightweight division. He has also competed for the UFC, as an alternate for the Tucson Scorpions in the IFL, BAMMA, and King of the Cage. He is the former King of the Cage Welterweight Champion.

Michael was featured in the movie documentary "The Hurt Business" that debuted September 29, 2016 playing himself.

== Background ==
Guymon was born in Newport Beach, CA but raised in Irvine, CA. He attended many different schools but graduated from Woodbridge High School and went to Orange Coast College to further his studies. Guymon was trying to live his dream of playing professional baseball but while doing that he stumbled into mixed martial arts and instantly fell in love with the sport. He began training Muay Thai and kickboxing soon after finding out about the new combat sport. Once Guymon noticed that to become successful in MMA he would need to start developing a ground game, he started taking classes on Brazilian jiu-jitsu and wrestling.

== Mixed martial arts career ==
In 1999, Guymon had his first professional fight against Zach Turnage with the fight resulting in a draw after fighting in three five-minute rounds and a five-minute overtime. He won two straight before opening the eyes of the matchmaker for the King of the Cage promotion who offered him a fight against up and comer, Diego Sanchez. Guymon took the fight and lost by armbar submission with three seconds left in the first round.

Guymon's next four fights came inside the King of the Cage promotion all wins and all of them coming by submission in the first round. With the four wins he improved his overall record to 6-1-1 getting him signed to the IFL. He made his debut taking on Pat Healy losing via a split decision. Guymon then returned to King of the Cage and won five straight fights, the last one being for the King of the Cage Welterweight Championship just three weeks after his suicide attempt.

=== Ultimate Fighting Championship ===
Four days after defending the King of the Cage Welterweight Championship against Quinn Mulhern, Guymon received a call from the UFC about signing a contract. Guymon accepted and signed onto a four-fight deal.

He lost his UFC debut on January 11, 2010, in Fairfax, Virginia, at UFC Fight Night 20 against 20-year-old Canadian, Rory MacDonald. The fight stayed standing for the most part but ended when Rory took the fight to the ground and submission submitted Guymon with an armbar near the end of the first round.

Guymon defeated Yoshiyuki Yoshida on May 8, 2010, at UFC 113 by unanimous decision.

Guymon faced Daniel Roberts on October 23, 2010, at UFC 121. Guymon would go on to lose the fight after Roberts locked on an anaconda choke, following with a gator roll that tightened the squeeze forcing Guymon to tap.

Guymon next faced DaMarques Johnson on January 22, 2011, at UFC Fight Night 23 where he was injured early into the fight. He lost via verbal submission in the first round. After the fight, due to rupturing two discs in his back, Guymon announced his retirement from MMA.

=== Post-UFC ===
Guymon came out of retirement on March 16, 2012, dropping down to the Lightweight division where he defeated Chris Leyva by TKO due to punches in the second round at BAMMA USA: Badbeat 5. In his second fight at Lightweight in Bamma USA he beat Mike Dizack by split decision.

Guymon faced Savant Young at Bellator 85. He suffered the first knockout loss of his career after a left hook from Young put Guymon out cold, just under a minute into the second round. After the fight, Guymon was taken to the hospital, where the doctor noticed he had fracture of the orbital, cheekbone and jaw. The doctor advised Guymon to never compete again in any combat sport.

Days after his first Bellator win against Aaron Miller on November 2, 2013, Guymon announced his retirement from MMA for the second time.

== Personal life ==
Mike Guymon and Nicole Guymon Divorced in 2021.

=== Suicide attempt ===
On August 11, 2009, Guymon attempted to commit suicide after a dispute with his wife about possibly divorcing. Guymon wrote his family a suicide note and had planned to shoot himself with a handgun, but before he could do so, his wife was able to wrestle the gun away. Guymon then got into his truck and drove away but was stopped a few blocks away by the Orange County Sheriffs Department. Guymon tried numerous times to get the deputies to shoot and kill him but all refused. The deputies were able to calm Guymon down and get him some help.

== Mixed martial arts record ==
Professional record breakdown
22 matches	15 wins	6 losses
By knockout	8	1
By submission	5	4
By decision	2	1
Draws	1	

Res.	Record	Opponent	Method	Event	Date	Round	Time	Location	Notes
Win	15–6–1	Aaron Miller	Submission (triangle choke)	Bellator 106	November 2, 2013	2	4:20	Long Beach, California, United States	
Loss	14–6–1	Savant Young	KO (punch)	Bellator 85	January 17, 2013	2	0:48	Irvine, California, United States	
Win	14–5–1	Mike Dizak	Decision (unanimous)	BAMMA USA: Badbeat 6	July 13, 2012	3	5:00	Commerce, California, United States	
Win	13–5–1	Cris Leyva	TKO (punches)	BAMMA USA: Badbeat 5	March 16, 2012	2	4:10	Commerce, California, United States	Lightweight debut.
Loss	12–5–1	DaMarques Johnson	Submission (body triangle)	UFC: Fight for the Troops 2	January 22, 2011	1	3:22	Killeen, Texas, United States	
Loss	12–4–1	Daniel Roberts	Submission (anaconda choke)	UFC 121	October 23, 2010	1	1:13	Anaheim, California, United States	
Win	12–3–1	Yoshiyuki Yoshida	Decision (unanimous)	UFC 113	May 8, 2010	3	5:00	Montreal, Quebec, Canada	
Loss	11–3–1	Rory MacDonald	Submission (armbar)	UFC Fight Night: Maynard vs. Diaz	January 11, 2010	1	4:27	Fairfax, Virginia, United States	
Win	11–2–1	Quinn Mulhern	TKO (submission to punch)	KOTC: Distorted	October 1, 2009	4	4:32	Highland, California, United States	Defended the KOTC Welterweight Championship.
Win	10–2–1	Kyacey Uscola	TKO (punches)	KOTC: Militia	June 11, 2009	2	1:12	Highland, California, United States	Defended the KOTC Welterweight Championship.
Win	9–2–1	Anthony Lapsley	Submission (arm-triangle choke)	KOTC: Prowler	December 11, 2008	5	3:37	Highland, California, United States	Won the KOTC Welterweight Championship.
Win	8–2–1	James Fanshier	TKO (punches)	KOTC: Bio Hazard	August 14, 2008	1	2:54	Highland, California, United States	
Win	7–2–1	Chris Moore	TKO (punch)	KOTC: Fight Nite @ The Shrine	April 19, 2008	2	1:52	Los Angeles, California, United States	
Loss	6–2–1	Pat Healy	Decision (split)	IFL: Las Vegas	June 16, 2007	3	4:00	Las Vegas, Nevada, United States	
Win	6–1–1	Josh Ramage	Submission (triangle choke)	KOTC: Destroyer	December 1, 2006	1	1:52	San Jacinto, California, United States	
Win	5–1–1	Ken Cadoy	Submission (guillotine choke)	KOTC 63: Final Conflict	December 2, 2005	1	N/A	San Jacinto, California, United States	
Win	4–1–1	Ray Perales	Submission (triangle choke)	KOTC 58: Prime Time	August 5, 2005	1	4:02	San Jacinto, California, United States	
Win	3–1–1	Joe Frainee	TKO (submission to punches)	KOTC 41: Relentless	November 14, 2004	1	2:22	San Jacinto, California, United States	
Loss	2–1–1	Diego Sanchez	Submission (armbar)	KOTC 23: Sin City	May 16, 2003	1	4:57	Las Vegas, Nevada, United States	
Win	2–0–1	Thomas Schulte	Submission (armbar)	Ultimate Athlete 3: Vengeance	August 10, 2002	1	3:51	Denver, Colorado, United States	
Win	1–0–1	Eric Duus	TKO (punches)	Ultimate Athlete 2: The Gathering	March 16, 2002	1	4:32	Cabazon, California, United States	
Draw	0–0–1	Zach Turnage	Draw	Kage Kombat 15	May 3, 1999	1	10:00	Los Angeles, California, United States	
