= Albert Tumenov =

Russian mixed martial arts fighter (born 1991)

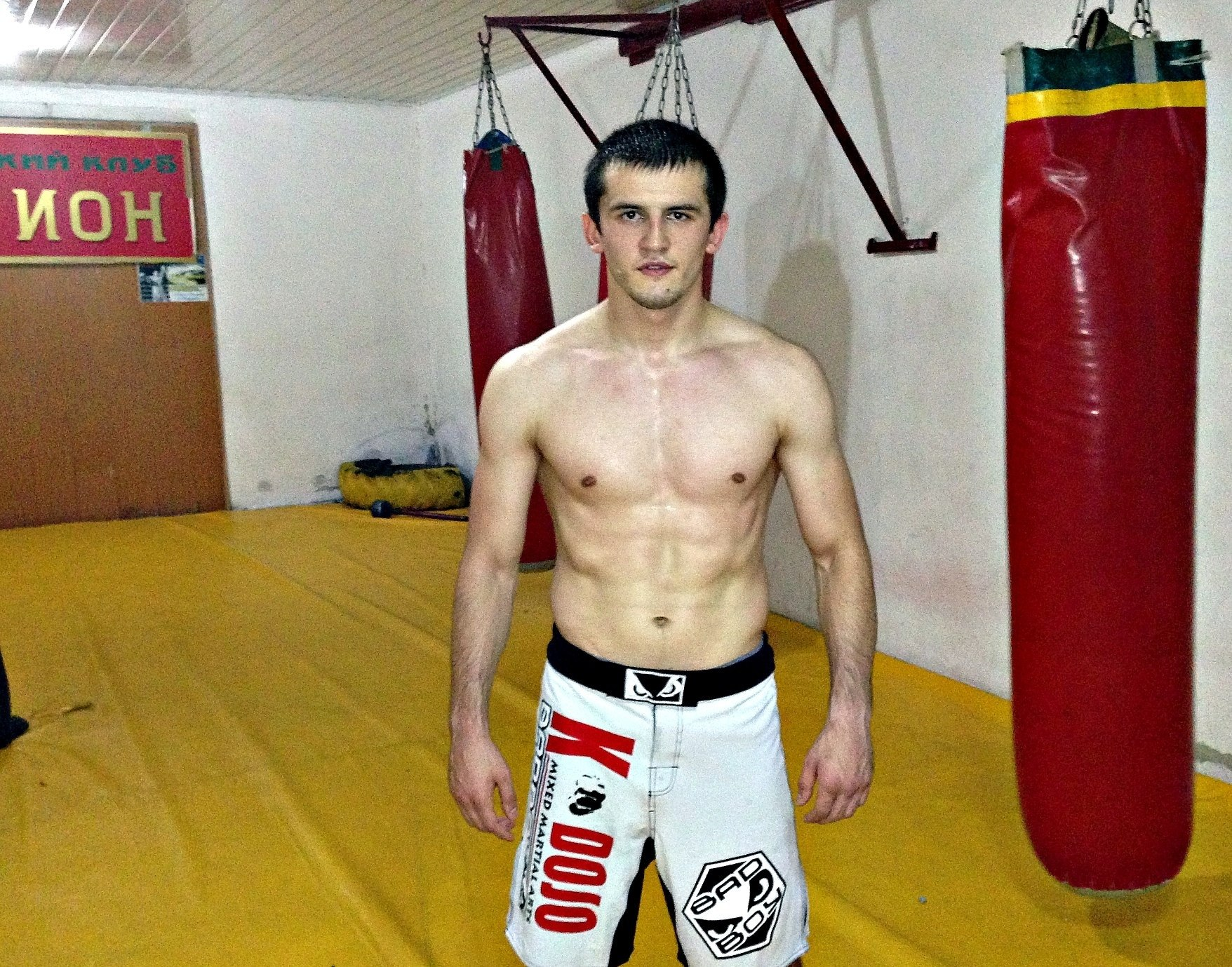
- Albert Tumenov in Bastion Boxing Club
- Born: Albert Khuseinovich Tumenov; December 26, 1991 (age 34); Nalchik, Russia
- Native name: Альберт Туменланы
- Nickname: Einstein
- Height: 5 ft 9 in (1.75 m)
- Weight: 171 lb (78 kg; 12.2 st)
- Division: Welterweight
- Reach: 73 in (190 cm)
- Style: Boxing, Karate, Kickboxing
- Fighting out of: Nalchik, Kabardino-Balkaria, Russia
- Team: Bastion Boxing Club; American Top Team
- Trainer: Khusein Tumenov
- Rank: Master of Sports in Boxing
- Years active: 2010–present

Mixed martial arts record
- Total: 32
- Wins: 25
- By knockout: 16
- By decision: 9
- Losses: 7
- By submission: 2
- By decision: 5

Other information
- Website: alberttumenov.com
- Mixed martial arts record from Sherdog

Albert Khuseinovich Tumenov (Russian: Альберт Туменов; Karachay-Balkar: Туменланы Альберт Хусейнни жашы; born December 26, 1991) is a Russian professional mixed martial artist and former amateur boxer. Tumenov competes in the welterweight division of the Absolute Championship Berkut where he is the two time ACA Welterweight Champion. A professional competitor since 2010, Tumenov has also competed in the Ultimate Fighting Championship (UFC).

== Mixed martial arts career ==
=== Early career ===
With the help of his father, Tumenov began training in karate and boxing at age six. After five years of training in karate, Albert became a student of hand-to-hand combat. He made his professional MMA debut when he was 18 years old. Albert's coach is his father Khusein, who has a Master of Sports degree in boxing.

=== ProFC ===
Tumenov faced Kadzhik Abadzhyan on February 13, 2010. He won the back-and-forth fight via knockout in the first round. In second fight for the promotion, Tumenov faced powerful Armenian wrestler Vahe Tadevosyan on October 22, 2012, at ProFC — Union Nation Cup 9. Tumenov won the tough fight via unanimous decision. Tumenov faced Gocha Smoyan on January 22, 2011. He won the fight via split decision.

=== Ultimate Fighting Championship ===
In December 2013, Tumenov signed a four-fight contract with the UFC.

In his debut, Tumenov faced Ildemar Alcântara on February 15, 2014. at UFC Fight Night 36. He lost the fight via split decision.

Tumenov returned to the promotion on May 10, 2014, at UFC Fight Night 40 against Anthony Lapsley. He won the fight via KO in the first round.

For his third fight with the promotion, Tumenov faced Matt Dwyer on October 4, 2014, at UFC Fight Night: MacDonald vs. Saffiedine. He won the fight via KO in the first round.

Tumenov faced Nico Musoke on January 24, 2015, at UFC on Fox 14. He won the fight by unanimous decision.

Tumenov was expected to face Héctor Urbina on June 13, 2015, at UFC 188. However, Urbina was injured and was replaced by UFC newcomer Andrew Todhunter. Subsequently, the bout was then cancelled altogether on June 11 after Todhunter was medically disqualified from the card after dealing with issues while cutting weight.

Tumenov faced Alan Jouban on October 3, 2015, at UFC 192. He won the fight via knockout in the first round, which earned him his first Performance of the Night bonus.

Tumenov faced Lorenz Larkin on January 2, 2016, at UFC 195. He won the back-and-forth fight by split decision.

Tumenov next faced Gunnar Nelson on May 8, 2016, at UFC Fight Night 87. He lost the fight via submission in the second round.

Tumenov faced Leon Edwards on October 8, 2016, at UFC 204. He lost the fight via submission in the third round. This was Tumenov's last fight on his UFC contract and he declined to sign a new deal.

=== Absolute Championship Berkut ===
On 6 March 2017 Tumenov signed a three-fight deal with the ACB.

Tumenov was tabbed as a short notice replacement for Marcelo Alfaya and faced Ismael de Jesus on May 20, 2017, at ACB 61. He won the fight via knockout in the first round.

Tumenov was expected to fight at ACB 80 on February 17, 2018, in Krasnodar, Russia against Mukhamed Berkhamov, but the latter got injured and was replaced by Nah-Shon Burrell. Tumenov won the fight by unanimous decision (30–27, 30–27, 30–27).

Tumenov fought Ciro Rodrigues for the welterweight championship at ACB 89 on September 8, 2018. Tumenov won the fight via technical knockout in the third round and claimed the championship.

After ACB and WFCA merged to become ACA, Tumenov claimed the ACA Welterweight Champion by defeating Murad Abdulaev via unanimous decision on April 27, 2019, at ACA 95: Tumenov vs. Abdulaev.

Tumenov defended the title facing Beslan Ushukov on November 29, 2019, at ACA 102: Tumenov vs. Ushukov. He won the bout via knockout in the second round.

After two years trying to sign with the UFC, Tumenov resigned with ACA.

In his ACA return, Tumenov faced Gadzhimurad Khiramagomedov on October 4, 2022, at ACA 146. He won the bout via unanimous decision.

Tumenov faced Altynbek Mamashov in the Quarterfinal of the 2023 ACA Welterweight Grand Prix on March 17, 2023, at ACA 154: Vakhaev vs Goncharov, winning the bout via unanimous decision.

In the semi-finals, Tumenov faced reigning champ Ustarmagomed Gadzhidaudov for the ACA Welterweight Champion on December 24, 2023, at ACA 168: Gadzhidaudov vs. Tumenov, winning the bout and belt via fifth-round knockout.

== Personal life ==
Tumenov's family comes from a Balkar background. Tumenov is a Muslim. His cousin is amateur world boxing champion Bibert Tumenov.

== Championships and accomplishments ==
=== Mixed Martial Arts ===
- Ultimate Fighting Championship
  - Performance of the Night (One time) vs. Alan Jouban
  - UFC.com Awards
    - 2014: Ranked #8 Knockout of the Year vs. Matt Dwyer
- Absolute Championship Akhmat
  - ACA Welterweight Champion (Two time)
    - One successful title defense
- Absolute Championship Bekrut
  - ACB Welterweight Champion (One time; Final)
- Sportbox.ru
  - Best Russian MMA fighter (2015)
- Fight TV (Russia)
  - Best Russian MMA fighter (2015)
- Fight Matrix
  - Most Improved Fighter of the Year (2013)

=== Boxing ===
- Russian Federation of Boxing
  - Russian Kabardino-Balkaria Championships Medalist.
  - Russian National level in Boxing.

=== Hand-to-hand combat ===
- Russian Union of Martial Arts
  - Russian National Hand-to-hand gold medalist (2009, 2013).

== Mixed martial arts record ==
Professional record breakdown
32 matches	25 wins	7 losses
By knockout	16	0
By submission	0	2
By decision	9	5

Res.	Record	Opponent	Method	Event	Date	Round	Time	Location	Notes
Loss	25–7	Magomedrasul Gasanov	Decision (unanimous)	ACA 200	February 6, 2026	5	5:00	Moscow, Russia	Middleweight debut. For the ACA Middleweight Championship.
Win	25–6	Vinicius Cruz	TKO (punches)	ACA 191	September 5, 2025	2	3:30	Krasnodar, Russia	Performance of the Night.
Loss	24–6	Abubakar Vagaev	Decision (unanimous)	ACA 183	February 8, 2025	5	5:00	Krasnodar, Russia	2023 ACA Welterweight Grand Prix Final. Lost the ACA Welterweight Championship.
Win	24–5	Ustarmagomed Gadzhidaudov	KO (punches)	ACA 168	December 24, 2023	5	4:53	Moscow, Russia	2023 ACA Welterweight Grand Prix Semifinal. Won the ACA Welterweight Championship. Performance of the Night.
Win	23–5	Altynbek Mamashov	Decision (unanimous)	ACA 154	March 17, 2023	5	5:00	Krasnodar, Russia	2023 ACA Welterweight Grand Prix Quarterfinal.
Win	22–5	Gadzhimurad Khiramagomedov	Decision (unanimous)	ACA 146	October 4, 2022	3	5:00	Grozny, Russia	
Win	21–5	Beslan Ushukov	KO (punch)	ACA 102	November 29, 2019	2	3:12	Almaty, Kazakhstan	Defended the ACA Welterweight Championship.
Win	20–5	Murad Abdulaev	Decision (unanimous)	ACA 95	April 27, 2019	3	5:00	Moscow, Russia	Won the inaugural ACA Welterweight Championship.
Win	19–5	Ciro Rodrigues	TKO (punches)	ACB 89	September 8, 2018	3	4:48	Krasnodar, Russia	Won the vacant ACB Welterweight Championship.
Win	18–5	Nah-Shon Burrell	Decision (unanimous)	ACB 80	February 16, 2018	3	5:00	Krasnodar, Russia	
Win	17–5	Ismael de Jesus	KO (punch)	ACB 61	May 20, 2017	1	0:46	Saint Petersburg, Russia	
Loss	16–5	Leon Edwards	Submission (rear-naked choke)	UFC 204	October 8, 2016	3	3:01	Manchester, England	
Loss	16–4	Gunnar Nelson	Submission (neck crank)	UFC Fight Night: Overeem vs. Arlovski	May 8, 2016	2	3:15	Rotterdam, Netherlands	
Win	16–3	Lorenz Larkin	Decision (split)	UFC 195	January 2, 2016	3	5:00	Las Vegas, Nevada, United States	
Win	15–3	Alan Jouban	TKO (head kick and punches)	UFC 192	October 3, 2015	1	2:55	Houston, Texas, United States	Performance of the Night.
Win	14–3	Nico Musoke	Decision (unanimous)	UFC on Fox: Gustafsson vs. Johnson	January 24, 2015	3	5:00	Stockholm, Sweden	
Win	13–3	Matt Dwyer	KO (head kick and punch)	UFC Fight Night: MacDonald vs. Saffiedine	October 4, 2014	1	1:03	Halifax, Nova Scotia, Canada	
Win	12–3	Anthony Lapsley	KO (punch)	UFC Fight Night: Brown vs. Silva	May 10, 2014	1	3:56	Cincinnati, Ohio, United States	
Loss	11–3	Ildemar Alcântara	Decision (split)	UFC Fight Night: Machida vs. Mousasi	February 15, 2014	3	5:00	Jaraguá do Sul, Brazil	
Win	11–2	Yasubey Enomoto	TKO (head kick and punches)	Fight Nights: Battle of Moscow 13	October 26, 2013	1	3:52	Moscow, Russia	
Win	10–2	Roman Mironenko	TKO (punches)	Fight Nights: Battle of Moscow 12	June 20, 2013	1	2:43	Moscow, Russia	
Win	9–2	Viskhan Amirkhanov	TKO (punches)	Tech-Krep FC: Southern Front	March 2, 2013	1	0:38	Krasnodar, Russia	
Win	8–2	Rasul Shovhalov	TKO (punches)	South Russian Pankration Championship 2012: Stage 2	December 8, 2012	1	3:38	Krasnodar, Russia	
Win	7–2	Yuri Kozlov	TKO (punches)	South Russian Pankration Championship 2012: Stage 1	September 23, 2012	1	1:39	Khabarovsk, Russia	
Win	6–2	Ashamaz Kanukoev	KO (punches)	FCF-MMA: Eurasian Championship 2012	August 24, 2012	2	2:05	Nalchik, Russia	Won the 2012 FCF-MMA Eurasian Welterweight Tournament.
Win	5–2	Islam Dadilov	TKO (punches)	FCF-MMA: Russian Championship 2012	June 8, 2012	1	2:37	Gudermes, Russia	Won the 2012 FCF-MMA Russian Welterweight Tournament.
Win	4–2	Kazavat Suleymanov	Decision (unanimous)	FCF-MMA: Russian Championship 2012	June 8, 2012	3	5:00	Gudermes, Russia	2012 FCF-MMA Russian Welterweight Tournament Semifinal.
Loss	3–2	Murad Abdulaev	Decision (unanimous)	FCF-MMA: Absolute Cup 2011	May 15, 2011	2	5:00	Nalchik, Russia	
Loss	3–1	Gocha Smoyan	Decision (split)	ProFC 24: Union Nation Cup 12	January 22, 2011	2	5:00	Tbilisi, Georgia	
Win	3–0	Said Khalilov	Decision (unanimous)	ProFC 23: Union Nation Cup 11	December 25, 2010	2	5:00	Babruysk, Belarus	
Win	2–0	Vahe Tadevosyan	Decision (unanimous)	ProFC 18: Union Nation Cup 9	October 22, 2010	2	5:00	Nalchik, Russia	
Win	1–0	Kadzhik Abadzhyan	TKO (punches)	ProFC 13: Union Nation Cup 5	February 13, 2010	1	2:02	Nalchik, Russia	Welterweight debut.

== Professional boxing record ==
1 fight	1 win	0 losses
By decision	1	0

No.	Result	Record	Opponent	Type	Round, time	Date	Location	Notes
1	Win	1–0	(United States) Scott Sigmon	UD	7	27 Nov 2021	(United States) Globe Life Field, Arlington, Texas, US	Triad Combat Custom Rules Bout

== Filmography ==
Year	Title	Role	Notes
2016	Love is just around the corner (on the STS)	Albert	TV series

== See also ==
- List of current UFC fighters
- List of male mixed martial artists
