= Costas Philippou =

Cypriot mixed martial arts fighter

- Born: Constantinos Philippou; November 29, 1979 (age 46); Limassol, Cyprus
- Height: 5 ft 11 in (1.80 m)
- Weight: 185 lb (84 kg; 13.2 st)
- Division: Middleweight; Light Heavyweight
- Reach: 73 in (190 cm)
- Stance: Orthodox
- Fighting out of: Long Island, New York
- Team: Bellmore Kickboxing MMA
- Rank: Purple belt in Brazilian Jiu-Jitsu under Matt Serra
- Years active: 2008–2015

Mixed martial arts record
- Total: 19
- Wins: 13
- By knockout: 7
- By submission: 1
- By decision: 5
- Losses: 5
- By knockout: 1
- By decision: 4
- No contests: 1

Other information
- Boxing record from BoxRec
- Mixed martial arts record from Sherdog

Constantinos Philippou (born November 29, 1979) is a Cypriot former mixed martial artist. He formerly fought for the UFC's Middleweight division.

== Early life ==
Philippou was born in Limassol on 29 November 1979.

== Career ==
=== Boxing ===
Philippou began boxing in 1994 and had his first fight six months later. In 2005, his best friend and coach Polis encouraged him to move to the United States to become a professional. Costas fought in the Golden Gloves two months after coming to the United States, but lost in the finals at Madison Square Garden by a split decision to Nagy Aguilera. Philippou then turned pro and had three fights three wins, the third being featured on ESPN. Costas transitioned to MMA after disputes with his manager and coach.

=== Mixed martial arts ===
Philippou made his professional MMA debut in May 2008 for the Ring of Combat promotion, losing to fellow future UFC fighter Ricardo Romero by split decision. However, he subsequently amassed a record of 7 wins, 1 loss and 1 no contest within that promotion. Philippou had previously trained with the Serra-Longo Fight Team, but as of May 30, 2013, he decided to switch camps to Bellmore Kickboxing Academy. According to Matt Serra, Philippou left the team on good terms.

==== The Ultimate Fighter 11 ====
Philippou first made his appearance in the UFC on The Ultimate Fighter: Team Liddell vs. Team Ortiz. However, he never made it as part of the cast to move into the house after losing to Joseph Henle via submission in the opening elimination bout.

==== Ultimate Fighting Championship ====
Philippou got a second chance in the UFC after stepping in as a late replacement for Dan Miller, who was moved up the card to face Nate Marquardt, facing Nick Catone at UFC 128 in a catchweight bout of 195 pounds. He lost the fight via unanimous decision.

Philippou was expected to face BJJ black belt Rafael Natal on August 6, 2011, at UFC 133, replacing an injured Riki Fukuda. However, an injury forced Alessio Sakara out of his main card bout against Jorge Rivera, and Philippou was pulled from his bout with Natal and named as Sakara's replacement against Rivera. Philippou won the fight via split decision, earning his first UFC victory.

Philippou faced off against Jared Hamman on December 10, 2011, at UFC 140. He won the match via KO at 3:11 in the first round.

Philippou fought TUF 11 winner Court McGee on March 3, 2012, at UFC on FX 2. He won the fight via unanimous decision after a back and forth bout.

Philippou next defeated Riki Fukuda via unanimous decision on July 7, 2012, at UFC 148.

Philippou was expected to face Nick Ring on November 17, 2012, at UFC 154 however, the fight was cancelled on the day of the event as Ring fell ill.

Philippou replaced his injured training partner Chris Weidman against Tim Boetsch at UFC 155 on December 29, 2012. Philippou was victorious with a third round TKO stoppage.

Philippou was expected to face Ronaldo Souza on May 18, 2013, at UFC on FX 8. However, Philippou pulled out of the bout in early May, citing a cut above his eye, and was replaced by Chris Camozzi.

Philippou next faced Francis Carmont at UFC 165. He lost the fight via unanimous decision (30–26, 30–27, 30–27).

Philippou faced Luke Rockhold on January 15, 2014, at UFC Fight Night 35. He lost the fight via KO in the first round.

Philippou faced Lorenz Larkin in the co-main event at UFC Fight Night 40. He won the fight via knockout in the first round.

Philippou was expected to face Uriah Hall on January 18, 2015, at UFC Fight Night 59, however, Philippou would be forced out the bout due to injury.

Philippou faced Gegard Mousasi on May 16, 2015, at UFC Fight Night 66. He lost the fight by unanimous decision.

On July 7, 2015, Philippou retired from mixed martial arts competition. Earlier in the day, he made his Twitter account private, with an avatar that read, "THIS ACCOUNT IS NO LONGER IN SERVICE. PLEASE UNFOLLOW." The UFC then confirmed via Twitter that Phillippou had told them of his retirement.

== Personal life ==
Philippou resides in New York City.

== Championships and accomplishments ==
- Ultimate Fighting Championship
  - UFC.com Awards
    - 2011: Ranked #10 Newcomer of the Year
    - 2012: Ranked #10 Fighter of the Year
- Ring of Combat
  - ROC Middleweight Championship (1 time)

== Mixed martial arts record ==
Professional record breakdown
19 matches	13 wins	5 losses
By knockout	7	1
By submission	1	0
By decision	5	4
No contests	1	

Res.	Record	Opponent	Method	Event	Date	Round	Time	Location	Notes
Loss	13–5 (1)	Gegard Mousasi	Decision (unanimous)	UFC Fight Night: Edgar vs. Faber	May 16, 2015	3	5:00	Pasay, Philippines	
Win	13–4 (1)	Lorenz Larkin	KO (punches)	UFC Fight Night: Brown vs. Silva	May 10, 2014	1	3:27	Cincinnati, Ohio, United States	
Loss	12–4 (1)	Luke Rockhold	TKO (body kick)	UFC Fight Night: Rockhold vs. Philippou	January 15, 2014	1	2:31	Duluth, Georgia, United States	
Loss	12–3 (1)	Francis Carmont	Decision (unanimous)	UFC 165	September 21, 2013	3	5:00	Toronto, Ontario, Canada	
Win	12–2 (1)	Tim Boetsch	TKO (punches)	UFC 155	December 29, 2012	3	2:11	Las Vegas, Nevada, United States	
Win	11–2 (1)	Riki Fukuda	Decision (unanimous)	UFC 148	July 7, 2012	3	5:00	Las Vegas, Nevada, United States	
Win	10–2 (1)	Court McGee	Decision (unanimous)	UFC on FX: Alves vs. Kampmann	March 3, 2012	3	5:00	Sydney, Australia	
Win	9–2 (1)	Jared Hamman	KO (punches)	UFC 140	December 10, 2011	1	3:11	Toronto, Ontario, Canada	
Win	8–2 (1)	Jorge Rivera	Decision (split)	UFC 133	August 6, 2011	3	5:00	Philadelphia, Pennsylvania, United States	
Loss	7–2 (1)	Nick Catone	Decision (unanimous)	UFC 128	March 19, 2011	3	5:00	Newark, New Jersey, United States	Catchweight (195 lbs) bout.
Win	7–1 (1)	Uriah Hall	Decision (majority)	Ring of Combat 34	February 4, 2011	3	4:00	Atlantic City, New Jersey, United States	
Win	6–1 (1)	Aung La N Sang	TKO (punches)	Ring of Combat 33	December 3, 2010	1	0:11	Atlantic City, New Jersey, United States	
NC	5–1 (1)	Marcus Finch	NC (groin kick)	Ring of Combat 32	October 23, 2010	2	2:47	Atlantic City, New Jersey, United States	
Win	5–1	Victor O'Donnell	Decision (unanimous)	Ring of Combat 26	September 11, 2009	3	5:00	Atlantic City, New Jersey, United States	Won the Ring of Combat Middleweight Championship.
Win	4–1	Aaron Meisner	Submission (rear-naked choke)	Ring of Combat 23	February 20, 2009	1	2:27	Atlantic City, New Jersey, United States	
Win	3–1	John Doyle	TKO (punches)	Ring of Combat 22	November 21, 2008	3	3:05	Atlantic City, New Jersey, United States	
Win	2–1	Brendan Barrett	TKO (doctor stoppage)	Ring of Combat 21	September 12, 2008	1	3:29	Atlantic City, New Jersey, United States	
Win	1–1	Tony Andreocci	KO (punch)	Ring of Combat 20	June 27, 2008	1	0:22	Atlantic City, New Jersey, United States	
Loss	0–1	Ricardo Romero	Decision (split)	Ring of Combat 19	May 9, 2008	3	5:00	Atlantic City, New Jersey, United States	Light Heavyweight bout.

== See also ==
- List of current UFC fighters
- List of male mixed martial artists
