= Anthony Lapsley =

American mixed martial arts fighter

- Born: February 13, 1980 (age 46); Boston, Massachusetts, United States
- Other names: The Recipe
- Height: 5 ft 9 in (1.75 m)
- Weight: 174 lb (79 kg; 12.4 st)
- Division: Welterweight; Middleweight
- Reach: 71.0 in (180 cm)
- Style: Folkstyle Wrestling
- Fighting out of: Fort Wayne, Indiana, United States
- Team: Team Deadly Jiu-Jitsu
- Years active: 2006–present

Mixed martial arts record
- Total: 33
- Wins: 23
- By knockout: 3
- By submission: 16
- By decision: 4
- Losses: 8
- By knockout: 1
- By submission: 5
- By decision: 2
- No contests: 2

Other information
- University: Indiana State University
- Mixed martial arts record from Sherdog

Anthony Lapsley (born February 13, 1980) is an American professional mixed martial artist who most recently competed in the Welterweight division of the Ultimate Fighting Championship. A professional competitor since 2006, Lapsley has also formerly competed for King of the Cage, Bellator, ShoXC, HDNet Fights, and is the former King of the Cage Welterweight Champion.

== Background ==
Lapsley was born in Boston, Massachusetts, where he lived until he was 11 years old, when he moved to Fort Wayne, Indiana. Athletic, Lapsley played various sports, including basketball, and after his freshman season, when his playing high school football ended, his coach encouraged him to try wrestling. Lapsley began the sport and excelled, earning a state championship, but did not continue his career as he did not have the academic requirements to get a scholarship.

== Mixed martial arts career ==
Lapsley made his professional mixed martial arts debut in 2006. He quickly amassed an undefeated record of 7–0 before his first loss to Carlo Prater.

Lapsley has fought for various promotions, including ShoXC, HDNet Fights, and King of the Cage, where he was the Welterweight Champion.

=== Bellator Fighting Championships ===
Lapsley made his Bellator debut in 2009 at Bellator 7, where he defeated Ryan Williams via submission.

In January 2011, Bellator announced that Lapsley would replace Steve Carl in the Bellator Season 4 Welterweight Tournament. He faced former UFC and Strikeforce veteran, Jay Hieron in the quarterfinals. Lapsley lost via controversial stoppage when referee Josh Rosenthal stopped the bout, incorrectly believing that Lapsley was unconscious from a submission.

=== Ultimate Fighting Championship ===
It was announced in October 2013 that Lapsley had signed with the UFC. He debuted against Jason High on November 16, 2013, at UFC 167. He lost the fight via unanimous decision.

In his second fight for the promotion, Lapsley faced Albert Tumenov at UFC Fight Night 40 on May 10, 2014. He lost the fight via knockout in the first round and was released from the promotion.

=== Return from Retirement ===
After 8 years away from the cage, Lapsley returned on October 15, 2022, against Collin Huckbody at Art of Scrap 5, losing the bout via rear-naked choke in the first round.

== Personal life ==
Lapsley has eight children.

== Championships and accomplishments ==
=== Mixed martial arts ===
- King of the Cage
  - KOTC Welterweight Championship (One time)

== Mixed martial arts record ==
Professional record breakdown
34 matches	24 wins	8 losses
By knockout	3	1
By submission	16	5
By decision	5	2
No contests	2	

Res.	Record	Opponent	Method	Event	Date	Round	Time	Location	Notes
Loss	23–8 (2)	Collin Huckbody	Submission (rear-naked choke)	Art of Scrap 5	October 15, 2022	1	3:14	Fort Wayne, Indiana, United States	Return to Middleweight. For the AOS Middleweight Championship.
Loss	23–7 (2)	Albert Tumenov	KO (punch)	UFC Fight Night: Brown vs. Silva	May 10, 2014	1	3:56	Cincinnati, Ohio, United States	Lapsley missed weight.
Loss	23–6 (2)	Jason High	Decision (unanimous)	UFC 167	November 16, 2013	3	5:00	Las Vegas, Nevada, United States	
Win	23–5 (2)	John Troyer	Decision (unanimous)	MMA Xtreme: Fists Will Fly	August 24, 2013	3	5:00	Evansville, Indiana, United States	
Win	22–5 (2)	Gerald Meerschaert	Submission (rear-naked choke)	Rocktagon MMA: Elite Series 23	January 19, 2013	1	1:51	Cleveland, Ohio, United States	Catchweight (175 lbs) bout.
Win	21–5 (2)	Tony Parker	Submission (rear-naked choke)	International Combat Entertainment 55	September 8, 2012	1	2:43	Dayton, Ohio, United States	Middleweight bout.
Win	20–5 (2)	Daniel Head	Decision (unanimous)	Colosseum Combat 18	October 15, 2011	3	5:00	Kokomo, Indiana, United States	
Win	19–5 (2)	Jon Kennedy	Submission (heel hook)	Extreme Challenge 191	August 26, 2011	1	1:32	Bettendorf, Iowa, United States	
Loss	18–5 (2)	Jay Hieron	Technical Submission (rear-naked choke)	Bellator 35	March 5, 2011	1	3:39	Lemoore, California, United States	Welterweight Tournament Quarterfinal.
Win	18–4 (2)	Ted Worthington	Submission (rear-naked choke)	IFC: Extreme Challenge	July 10, 2010	2	2:08	Mount Pleasant, Michigan, United States	
Win	17–4 (2)	Frederic Belleton	Submission (kneebar)	Moosin: God of Martial Arts	May 21, 2010	1	0:59	Worcester, Massachusetts, United States	Middleweight bout.
Win	16–4 (2)	Dave Mewborn	Decision (unanimous)	Fury Fight Promotions: The Storm	March 20, 2010	3	5:00	North Charleston, South Carolina, United States	
Win	15–4 (2)	Ryan Williams	Submission (rear-naked choke)	Bellator 7	May 15, 2009	2	4:22	Chicago, Illinois, United States	
Loss	14–4 (2)	Mike Guymon	Submission (arm-triangle choke)	KOTC: Prowler	December 11, 2008	5	3:37	Highland, California, United States	Lost the KOTC Welterweight Championship.
Win	14–3 (2)	Mike Stumpf	Decision (majority)	ShoXC: Elite Challenger Series	October 10, 2008	3	5:00	Hammond, Indiana, United States	
Win	13–3 (2)	Aaron Wetherspoon	Submission (scarf hold armlock)	KOTC: Bio Hazard	August 14, 2008	1	1:34	Highland, California, United States	Won the KOTC Welterweight Championship.
NC	12–3 (2)	Aaron Wetherspoon	NC (double KO)	KOTC: Opposing Force	May 15, 2008	2	0:18	Highland, California, United States	For the KOTC Welterweight Championship.
Win	12–3 (1)	Tyler Stinson	Submission (triangle choke)	Midwest Cage Combat	November 2, 2007	2	3:39	Wichita, Kansas, United States	
NC	11–3 (1)	Jaime Jara	No Contest	KOTC: Arch Rivals	October 27, 2007	2	1:17	Reno, Nevada, United States	Overturned by NSAC; Lapsley tested positive for marijuana in post-fight drug test.
Loss	11–3	Drew Fickett	Submission (rear-naked choke)	HDNet Fights 1	October 13, 2007	1	3:55	Dallas, Texas, United States	
Win	11–2	Brent Weedman	TKO (doctor stoppage)	United Fight League	August 11, 2007	1	3:24	Indianapolis, Indiana, United States	
Loss	10–2	John Mahlow	Technical Submission (armbar)	Ultimate Warrior Challenge	June 30, 2007	3	3:38	Jacksonville, Florida, United States	
Win	10–1	David Gardner	Decision (unanimous)	World Cage Fighting 1	June 23, 2007	3	5:00	Southaven, Mississippi, United States	
Win	9–1	Kyle Gibbons	Submission (triangle choke)	LOF 18: Pole Position	May 25, 2007	1	2:45	Indianapolis, Indiana, United States	
Win	8–1	Andre Luis Novoes Pimenta	Submission (triangle choke)	IMMAC 2: Attack	April 21, 2007	1	2:15	Chicago, Illinois, United States	
Win	7–1	Josh Hickenbottom	Submission (armbar)	FCFS 9: Battlefield	March 24, 2007	1	0:48	Merrillville, Indiana, United States	
Loss	6–1	Carlo Prater	Decision (unanimous)	Art of War 1	March 9, 2007	3	5:00	Dallas, Texas, United States	
Win	6–0	John Mahlow	Submission (triangle choke)	KOTC: Mass Destruction	January 26, 2007	1	N/A	Mount Pleasant, Michigan, United States	
Win	5–0	Travis Burnett	Submission (armbar)	FCFS 6: Redemption	January 5, 2007	1	1:28	Fort Wayne, Indiana, United States	
Win	4–0	Doug Sparks	TKO (punches)	Extreme Combat Challenge: Season's Beatings	December 16, 2006	2	1:59	Muncie, Indiana, United States	
Win	3–0	Rok Wyler	Submission (rear-naked choke)	FCFS 4: Damage Control	November 19, 2006	1	0:49	Auburn, Indiana, United States	
Win	2–0	Curt Bee	TKO (punches)	KOTC: Meltdown	October 7, 2006	2	1:34	Indianapolis, Indiana, United States	
Win	1–0	Dave Morris	Submission (choke)	Kombat Zone 5	June 12, 2006	1	4:32	Fort Wayne, Indiana, United States	

== See also ==
- List of male mixed martial artists
- List of King of the Cage champions
