= Iuri Alcântara =

Brazilian mixed martial arts fighter

- Born: 4 August 1980 (age 46); Marajó, Brazil
- Other names: Marajó
- Height: 5 ft 9 in (1.75 m)
- Weight: 135 lb (61 kg; 9.6 st)
- Division: Bantamweight (2013–current); Featherweight (2011–2012); Lightweight (2004–2010); Welterweight (2010)
- Reach: 71 in (180 cm)
- Fighting out of: Soure, Pará, Brazil
- Team: Marajó Brothers Team; Wand Fight Team
- Rank: Black belt in Brazilian Jiu-Jitsu
- Years active: 2004–present

Mixed martial arts record
- Total: 48
- Wins: 36
- By knockout: 15
- By submission: 14
- By decision: 7
- Losses: 11
- By knockout: 3
- By submission: 2
- By decision: 6
- No contests: 1

Other information
- Notable relatives: Ildemar Alcântara (brother)
- Mixed martial arts record from Sherdog

Iuri Alcântara (born 4 August 1980) is a Brazilian mixed martial artist who competed in the UFC bantamweight division. A professional MMA competitor since 2003, Alcântara mostly fought in Brazil before signing with World Extreme Cagefighting to take part in their final event. He is the brother of fellow UFC fighter Ildemar Alcântara.

== Mixed martial arts career ==
=== Background and early career ===
Alcântara was born on the island of Marajó, Pará in Brazil. Incidentally, Alcântara takes his fighting nickname from the island and is billed as Iuri "Marajó" Alcântara. Alcântara trains at the "Striker Team" team and is managed by Wallid Ismail, the owner of the Jungle Fight promotion that Alcântara has competed in and won a championship.

Alcântara's early career was spaced out considerably. His debut fight took place in March 2004 and he would not return until June 2005, where he won twice in the space of four months. Amongst Alcântara's wins was a grand prix tournament victory in November 2009, when he defeated two fighters in a single night.

=== Jungle Fight ===
Alcântara then joined his manager's promotion, Jungle Fight, to compete at the Jungle Fight 19 event against Viscardi Andrade. He went the distance with Andrade, something that had only happened once before in his career. Alcântara won via split decision, the first decision victory in his career.

Following another win via armbar, outside of Jungle Fight, Alcântara returned for the Jungle Fight 21 event to face Armando Gomes. Alcântara claimed another first round stoppage, when he ended the fight via TKO (punches).

Alcântara entered into the lightweight grand prix at Jungle Fight 22. His opening round fight was against the highly touted, once undefeated Francisco Trinaldo. Trinaldo had previously been named as one of the top prospects in the sport of MMA, having defeated experienced veterans such as Luiz Firmino. Despite the reputation of his opponent, Alcântara was able to hand Trinaldo his first professional loss when he forced him to tap out to an armbar in the second round.

The win advanced Alcântara into the final where he faced the Peruvian Manuelo Morales. Alcântara ran through Morales, defeating him via TKO from a front kick to the body, in just 16 seconds of the opening round. With the win, Alcântara became the first ever Jungle Fight Lightweight Champion.

=== World Extreme Cagefighting ===
On 3 November 2010, it was announced that Alcântara had signed a five-fight deal with Zuffa and that his debut would come at World Extreme Cagefighting's final event, WEC 53. His opponent was Ricardo Lamas and Alcântara won via KO in the first round.

=== Ultimate Fighting Championship ===
On 28 October 2010, World Extreme Cagefighting merged with the Ultimate Fighting Championship. As part of the merger, most WEC fighters were transferred to the UFC.

Alcântara was expected to make his featherweight debut against Mackens Semerzier on 27 August 2011 at UFC 134 However, Semerzier was injured and was replaced on the card by promotional newcomer Antonio Carvalho. Carvalho was also forced from the bout with an injury, and was replaced by Felipe Arantes. Alcântara won the fight via unanimous decision.

Alcântara faced Michihiro Omigawa on 14 January 2012 at UFC 142. He won the fight via unanimous decision after rocking Omigawa on several occasions and almost submitting him with an armbar.

Alcântara faced promotional newcomer Hacran Dias on 23 June 2012 at UFC 147. Dias defeated Alcântara via unanimous decision.

Alcântara was expected to drop to bantamweight and face George Roop on 19 January 2013 at UFC on FX: Belfort vs. Bisping. However, Roop was forced out of the bout with an injury and was replaced by promotional newcomer Pedro Nobre. After nearly finishing Nobre early in the first round with a submission attempt, the bout was declared a no contest as Alcântara was ruled to have landed an inadvertent, but illegal strike to the back of Nobre's head, rendering him unable to continue at 2:11 of round 1. After the fight, UFC president Dana White accused Nobre of faking the injury.

Alcântara was expected to face Marcos Vinicius on 18 May 2013 at UFC on FX 8. However, Vinicius was forced out of the bout citing an injury. He instead faced promotional newcomer Iliarde Santos and won the fight via first-round TKO.

Alcântara faced Urijah Faber on 17 August 2013 at UFC Fight Night 26. Despite having Faber in trouble early in the first round, Alcântara was unable to stop Faber's wrestling and lost via unanimous decision.

Alcântara faced Wilson Reis on 15 February 2014 at UFC Fight Night 36. He won the fight via split decision.

Alcântara faced Vaughan Lee on 31 May 2014 at UFC Fight Night 41. He won the fight via KO early in the first round.

Alcântara next faced Russell Doane on 13 September 2014 at UFC Fight Night 51. He won the fight via unanimous decision.

Alcântara faced Frankie Saenz on 22 February 2015 at UFC Fight Night 61. Despite being the biggest betting favorite on the card, Alcântara lost the fight via unanimous decision.

Alcântara faced Leandro Issa on 1 August 2015 at UFC 190. He won the fight via unanimous decision.

Alcântara next faced Jimmie Rivera on 30 January 2016 at UFC on Fox 18. He lost the back-and-forth fight via unanimous decision. Both participants were awarded a Fight of the Night bonus.

Alcântara faced Brad Pickett on 8 October 2016 at UFC 204. He won the fight via submission in the first round and was awarded a Performance of the Night bonus.

Alcântara faced Luke Sanders on 4 March 2017 at UFC 209. After losing the first round and absorbing a number of strikes, Alcântara rallied back and won the fight via a kneebar submission in the second round and earned himself another Performance of the Night bonus.

Alcântara was briefly linked to a rematch with Felipe Arantes on 3 June 2017 at UFC 212. However, on 11 May, Arantes was pulled from the fight for undisclosed reasons and was replaced by promotional newcomer Brian Kelleher. Alcântara lost the fight via submission due to a guillotine choke in the first round.

Alcântara faced Alejandro Pérez on 9 December 2017 at UFC Fight Night 123. He lost the fight by unanimous decision. The California State Athletic Commission (CSAC) flagged Alcântara after the fight for gaining more than 10% of his weight from weigh-in to fight day. The CSAC later announced it would not license Alcântara to fight another bantamweight bout in California.

Alcântara faced Joe Soto on 3 February 2018 at UFC Fight Night 125. He won the fight via technical knockout sixty-six seconds into the first round. This win earned him the Performance of the Night bonus.

Alcântara faced Cory Sandhagen on 25 August 2018 at UFC Fight Night 135. Despite locking in a very tight armbar early in the first round, he ultimately lost via technical knockout in the second round. This fight earned him the Fight of Night award.

On 2 October 2020 it was reported Alcântara was released by the UFC.

=== Post UFC ===
In his first bout post UFC release, Alcântara made his return after 4 years off to face Daniel Bažant at FNC 7 on September 3, 2022. He lost the bout at the end of the first round via TKO stoppage due to ground and pound.

== Championships and accomplishments ==
=== Mixed martial arts ===
- Ultimate Fighting Championship
  - Fight of the Night (Two times) vs. Jimmie Rivera and Cory Sandhagen
  - Performance of the Night (Three times) vs. Brad Pickett, Luke Sanders and Joe Soto
  - UFC.com Awards
    - 2017: Ranked #6 Submission of the Year vs. Luke Sanders
- Sherdog
  - UFC/MMA 'Submission of the Year' 2017 - Top 5 List #3 vs. Luke Sanders
- Jungle Fight
  - Lightweight Champion (One time; first)

== Mixed martial arts record ==
Professional record breakdown
48 matches	36 wins	11 losses
By knockout	15	3
By submission	14	2
By decision	7	6
No contests	1	

Res.	Record	Opponent	Method	Event	Date	Round	Time	Location	Notes
Loss	36–11 (1)	Daniel Bažant	TKO (punches)	FNC 7	3 September 2022	1	4:49	Pula, Croatia	Return to Featherweight for FNC Featherweight Championship.
Loss	36–10 (1)	Cory Sandhagen	TKO (punches)	UFC Fight Night: Gaethje vs. Vick	25 August 2018	2	1:01	Lincoln, Nebraska, United States	Fight of the Night.
Win	36–9 (1)	Joe Soto	TKO (body kick and punches)	UFC Fight Night: Machida vs. Anders	3 February 2018	1	1:06	Belém, Brazil	Performance of the Night.
Loss	35–9 (1)	Alejandro Pérez	Decision (unanimous)	UFC Fight Night: Swanson vs. Ortega	9 December 2017	3	5:00	Fresno, California, United States	
Loss	35–8 (1)	Brian Kelleher	Submission (guillotine choke)	UFC 212	3 June 2017	1	1:48	Rio de Janeiro, Brazil	
Win	35–7 (1)	Luke Sanders	Submission (kneebar)	UFC 209	4 March 2017	2	3:13	Las Vegas, Nevada, United States	Sanders was deducted one point in round 1 due to an illegal knee. Performance of the Night.
Win	34–7 (1)	Brad Pickett	Submission (triangle choke)	UFC 204	8 October 2016	1	1:59	Manchester, England	Performance of the Night.
Loss	33–7 (1)	Jimmie Rivera	Decision (unanimous)	UFC on Fox: Johnson vs. Bader	30 January 2016	3	5:00	Newark, New Jersey, United States	Fight of the Night.
Win	33–6 (1)	Leandro Issa	Decision (unanimous)	UFC 190	1 August 2015	3	5:00	Rio de Janeiro, Brazil	
Loss	32–6 (1)	Frankie Saenz	Decision (unanimous)	UFC Fight Night: Bigfoot vs. Mir	22 February 2015	3	5:00	Porto Alegre, Brazil	
Win	32–5 (1)	Russell Doane	Decision (unanimous)	UFC Fight Night: Bigfoot vs. Arlovski	13 September 2014	3	5:00	Brasília, Brazil	
Win	31–5 (1)	Vaughan Lee	KO (punches)	UFC Fight Night: Munoz vs. Mousasi	31 May 2014	1	0:25	Berlin, Germany	
Win	30–5 (1)	Wilson Reis	Decision (split)	UFC Fight Night: Machida vs. Mousasi	15 February 2014	3	5:00	Jaraguá do Sul, Brazil	
Loss	29–5 (1)	Urijah Faber	Decision (unanimous)	UFC Fight Night: Shogun vs. Sonnen	17 August 2013	3	5:00	Boston, Massachusetts, United States	
Win	29–4 (1)	Iliarde Santos	KO (punches)	UFC on FX: Belfort vs. Rockhold	18 May 2013	1	2:31	Jaraguá do Sul, Brazil	
NC	28–4 (1)	Pedro Nobre	NC (punch to back of head)	UFC on FX: Belfort vs. Bisping	19 January 2013	1	2:11	São Paulo, Brazil	Bantamweight debut. A punch to the back of head rendered Nobre unable to continue.
Loss	28–4	Hacran Dias	Decision (unanimous)	UFC 147	23 June 2012	3	5:00	Belo Horizonte, Brazil	
Win	28–3	Michihiro Omigawa	Decision (unanimous)	UFC 142	14 January 2012	3	5:00	Rio de Janeiro, Brazil	
Win	27–3	Felipe Arantes	Decision (unanimous)	UFC 134	27 August 2011	3	5:00	Rio de Janeiro, Brazil	Featherweight debut.
Win	26–3	Ricardo Lamas	KO (punch)	WEC 53	16 December 2010	1	3:26	Glendale, Arizona, United States	
Win	25–3	Manuelo Morales	TKO (front kick to the body)	Jungle Fight 22	18 September 2010	1	0:16	São Paulo, Brazil	Won the Jungle Fight Lightweight Championship.
Win	24–3	Francisco Trinaldo	Submission (armbar)	Jungle Fight 22	18 September 2010	2	N/A	São Paulo, Brazil	
Win	23–3	Francisco Mario	Submission (kimura)	Amazon Fight 4	13 August 2010	3	0:28	Belém, Brazil	
Win	22–3	Armando Gomes	TKO (punches)	Jungle Fight 21	31 July 2010	1	N/A	Natal, Brazil	
Win	21–3	Joao Paulo Rodrigues	Submission (armbar)	Iron Man Championship 6	10 June 2010	1	2:11	Belém, Brazil	Return to Lightweight.
Win	20–3	Viscardi Andrade	Decision (split)	Jungle Fight 19: Warriors 3	17 April 2010	3	5:00	São Paulo, Brazil	Welterweight bout.
Win	19–3	Jackson Pontes	Submission (triangle armbar)	Iron Man Championship 5	11 March 2010	1	0:42	Belém, Brazil	
Win	18–3	Marinho Rocha	Submission (triangle choke)	Iron Man Championship 4	20 November 2009	1	3:40	Belém, Brazil	
Win	17–3	Jamil Silveira	Submission (triangle choke)	Leal Combat: Grand Prix	5 November 2009	1	0:45	Natal, Brazil	Won the Leal Combat Lightweight Grand Prix.
Win	16–3	Francisco Silva	TKO (knee injury)	Leal Combat: Grand Prix	5 November 2009	1	2:42	Natal, Brazil	
Loss	15–3	Mauricio Reis	Submission (kneebar)	Minotauro Combat 1	3 October 2009	1	0:49	Macapá, Brazil	
Win	15–2	Alexandre Alcântara	TKO (punches)	Belém Open Fight 2	17 September 2009	1	0:52	Macapá, Brazil	
Win	14–2	Rafael Carvalho	TKO (punches)	Iron Man Championship 3	10 September 2009	1	N/A	Belém, Brazil	
Win	13–2	Jimmy Nascimento	TKO (punches)	IMVT: Champions	19 April 2009	1	2:40	Belém, Brazil	
Win	12–2	Carlos Aldenis	TKO (punches)	Tribus de Vale Tudo	11 April 2009	2	3:22	Santarém, Brazil	
Win	11–2	Jimmy Nascimento	TKO (punches)	Iron Man Championship 2	19 March 2009	1	1:30	Belém, Brazil	
Win	10–2	Furdjel de Windt	Decision (unanimous)	Cage Fight Event: Rumble in the Jungle	21 December 2008	3	5:00	Paramaribo, Suriname	
Loss	9–2	Henrique Mello	Decision (unanimous)	Fury FC: Fury Trials	31 May 2008	2	5:00	Rio de Janeiro, Brazil	
Win	9–1	Elielson Almeida	Submission	Midway vs. Dinamite	15 May 2008	1	N/A	Belém, Brazil	
Win	8–1	Ronie Ronie	Submission (rear-naked choke)	DFC 2: The Lightweights	19 March 2008	1	N/A	Santarém, Brazil	
Loss	7–1	Andre Luis Oliveira	TKO (leg injury)	Predador FC 4: Kamae	25 January 2007	1	N/A	Brazil	
Win	7–0	Rerison Araujo	Submission (armbar)	Midway Fight	29 June 2006	2	N/A	Belém, Brazil	
Win	6–0	Ivanildo Santos	Submission (armbar)	EcoFight 2	6 May 2006	1	0:47	Macapá, Brazil	
Win	5–0	Michel Addario Bastos	TKO (punches)	EcoFight 2	6 May 2006	2	2:40	Macapá, Brazil	
Win	4–0	Rafael Addario Bastos	KO (punches)	Mega Combat Vale Tudo	1 October 2005	3	3:20	Belém, Brazil	
Win	3–0	Renenson Costa	Submission (armbar)	Iron Man Vale Tudo 7	11 June 2005	1	0:11	Macapá, Brazil	
Win	2–0	José de Arimatéia	Submission (armbar)	Desafio de Gigantes 2	13 March 2004	1	2:11	Macapá, Brazil	
Win	1–0	Erlon Gabriel	KO (punches)	Super Vale Tudo: Ananindeua	12 September 2003	1	3:17	Ananindeua, Brazil	

== See also ==
- List of male mixed martial artists
