= Jerrod Sanders =

American mixed martial arts fighter

- Born: October 1, 1979 (age 47); El Reno, Oklahoma, U.S.
- Other names: J-Reazie
- Height: 5 ft 10 in (1.78 m)
- Weight: 135 lb (61 kg; 9.6 st)
- Division: Bantamweight; Featherweight; Lightweight
- Reach: 72.0 in (183 cm)
- Fighting out of: Oklahoma City, Oklahoma, U.S.
- Team: American Top Team OKC
- Rank: Blue belt in Brazilian Jiu-Jitsu
- Wrestling: NCAA Division I Wrestling
- Years active: 2009 - Present

Mixed martial arts record
- Total: 21
- Wins: 16
- By knockout: 2
- By submission: 6
- By decision: 8
- Losses: 4
- By knockout: 1
- By submission: 2
- By decision: 1
- No contests: 1

Other information
- University: Oklahoma State University
- Mixed martial arts record from Sherdog

Jerrod Sanders (born October 1, 1979) is an American mixed martial artist. He has competed in the bantamweight, featherweight, and lightweight divisions.

== College career ==
Sanders wrestled collegiately at Oklahoma State, where he was an NCAA All-American, finishing 4th in the nation at 149-pounds in 2003.

== Mixed martial arts career ==
=== Early career ===
Sanders made his professional MMA debut in March 2010. He fought for a variety of promotions including Bellator MMA and World Series of Fighting. In the first four years of his career, he amassed a record of 14 wins against 1 loss.

=== Ultimate Fighting Championship ===
Sanders made his UFC debut against Yosdenis Cedeno on July 16, 2014, at UFC Fight Night 45. He lost the fight via TKO after the first round as Sanders was unable to continue.

Sanders next faced Pedro Munhoz on October 4, 2014, at UFC Fight Night: MacDonald vs. Saffiedine. He lost the fight via submission in the first round. Subsequently, Munhoz tested positive for exogenous origin of testosterone metabolites and the result was changed to a no contest.

In his third fight for the promotion, Sanders fought Russell Doane on July 12, 2015, at The Ultimate Fighter 21 Finale. He won the fight via unanimous decision.

Sanders next faced Felipe Arantes on July 7, 2016, at UFC Fight Night 90. He lost the fight via submission in the second round.

== Mixed martial arts record ==
Professional record breakdown
21 matches	16 wins	4 losses
By knockout	2	1
By submission	6	2
By decision	8	1
No contests	1	

Res.	Record	Opponent	Method	Event	Date	Round	Time	Location	Notes
Loss	16–4 (1)	Anselmo Luis Luna Jr.	Decision (split)	C3 Fights 46 - Clash at the Council	April 27, 2018	3	5:00	Newkirk, Oklahoma, United States	
Win	16–3 (1)	Chris Gutiérrez	Decision (unanimous)	C3 Fights - Fight Night	July 22, 2017	3	5:00	Newkirk, Oklahoma, United States	
Loss	15–3 (1)	Felipe Arantes	Submission (armbar)	UFC Fight Night: dos Anjos vs. Alvarez	July 7, 2016	2	1:39	Las Vegas, Nevada, United States	
Win	15–2 (1)	Russell Doane	Decision (unanimous)	The Ultimate Fighter: American Top Team vs. Blackzilians Finale	July 12, 2015	3	5:00	Las Vegas, Nevada, United States	
NC	14–2 (1)	Pedro Munhoz	NC (overturned)	UFC Fight Night: MacDonald vs. Saffiedine	October 4, 2014	1	0:39	Halifax, Nova Scotia, Canada	Return to Bantamweight. Originally a submission (guillotine choke) win for Munhoz; overturned after he tested positive for exogenous origin of testosterone metabolites.
Loss	14–2	Yosdenis Cedeno	TKO (retirement)	UFC Fight Night: Cowboy vs. Miller	July 16, 2014	1	5:00	Atlantic City, New Jersey, United States	Lightweight bout.
Win	14–1	Thomas Schulte	Decision (unanimous)	SCS 21: No Surrender	January 25, 2014	3	5:00	Hinton, Oklahoma, United States	
Win	13–1	Jeff Smith	Decision (unanimous)	WSOF 3	June 14, 2013	3	5:00	Las Vegas, Nevada, United States	
Win	12–1	Rocky Long	TKO (punches)	SCS 12: Red, White, Black and Blue	July 28, 2012	1	4:08	Hinton, Oklahoma, United States	Return to Featherweight.
Win	11–1	Derek Cranford	Submission (arm-triangle choke)	KOTC: Thunderstorm	June 16, 2012	1	2:37	Norman, Oklahoma, United States	Bantamweight debut.
Win	10–1	Willian Teixeira	Submission (D'Arce choke)	HCC 10: Haidar Capixaba Combat 10	May 12, 2012	1	2:41	Vitória, Brazil	Lightweight bout.
Win	9–1	Andrew Carrillo	Submission (choke)	SCS 9: Sugar Creek Showdown 9	January 28, 2012	1	4:32	Hinton, Oklahoma, United States	
Win	8–1	Dustin Blake	Decision (unanimous)	C3 Fights: Slamfest	January 21, 2012	3	5:00	Newkirk, Oklahoma, United States	
Win	7–1	Willie Mack	Decision (unanimous)	C3 Fights: Fall Brawl	October 22, 2011	3	3:00	Newkirk, Oklahoma, United States	
Win	6–1	Jimmy Van Horn	TKO (punches)	SCS 7: Sugar Creek Showdown 7	September 10, 2011	4	3:44	Hinton, Oklahoma, United States	
Win	5–1	Cody Carrillo	Submission (D'Arce choke)	C3 Fights: Great Plains Sizzling Slamfest	July 30, 2011	3	1:42	Newkirk, Oklahoma, United States	
Win	4–1	Rick Huff	Submission (rear-naked choke)	C3 Fights: MMA Championship Fights	June 4, 2011	1	0:58	Concho, Oklahoma, United States	
Win	3–1	Javier Obregon	Decision (unanimous)	SCS 5: Sugar Creek Showdown 5	May 14, 2011	3	5:00	Hinton, Oklahoma, United States	
Loss	2–1	Jeremy Spoon	Submission (rear-naked choke)	Bellator 37	March 19, 2011	2	0:26	Concho, Oklahoma, United States	Lightweight bout.
Win	2–0	William Joplin	Decision (unanimous)	C3 Fights: SlamFest	January 29, 2011	3	5:00	Newkirk, Oklahoma, United States	
Win	1–0	Anthony Christodoulou	Submission (D'Arce choke)	Fury Fight Promotions: The Storm	March 20, 2010	2	2:14	North Charleston, South Carolina, United States	

=== Mixed martial arts amateur record ===
Amateur record breakdown		
1 match	1 win	0 losses
By submission	1	0

Res.	Record	Opponent	Method	Event	Date	Round	Time	Location	Notes
Win	1–0	Robert Abrantes	Submission (rear-naked choke)	CFP: Clash at the Coast 3	June 6, 2009	1	1:57	Wilmington, North Carolina, United States	

== See also ==
- List of male mixed martial artists
