= UFC Fight Night: MacDonald vs. Saffiedine =

UFC mixed martial arts event in 2014

- The poster for UFC Fight Night: MacDonald vs. Saffiedine
- Promotion: Ultimate Fighting Championship
- Date: October 4, 2014
- Venue: Scotiabank Centre
- City: Halifax, Nova Scotia, Canada
- Attendance: 10,782
- Total gate: $926,000

Event chronology
UFC Fight Night: Nelson vs. Story	UFC Fight Night: MacDonald vs. Saffiedine	UFC 179: Aldo vs. Mendes 2

UFC Fight Night: MacDonald vs. Saffiedine (also known as UFC Fight Night 54) was a mixed martial arts event held at the Scotiabank Centre in Halifax, Nova Scotia, Canada on October 4, 2014.

== Background ==
This event was the first event the UFC hosted in Halifax and the third event in Canada in 2014, following The Ultimate Fighter Nations Finale: Bisping vs. Kennedy and UFC 174.

The main event featured a welterweight bout between Rory MacDonald and Tarec Saffiedine.

A bout between Paige VanZant and Kailin Curran was briefly linked to this event, but delayed a month and rescheduled for UFC Fight Night 57, after VanZant suffered a minor injury.

Aljamain Sterling was expected to face Mitch Gagnon at this event. However, Sterling was forced to withdraw due to an injury and was replaced by Rob Font. Subsequently, Font pulled out of the fight the week of the event and was replaced by promotional newcomer Roman Salazar.

Louis Gaudinot was expected to face Paddy Holohan at the event. However, Gaudinot pulled out of the fight in the week leading up to the event and was replaced by promotional newcomer Chris Kelades.

The main card was slated to air on Fox Sports 1, but due to the length of game 2 of the 2014 National League Division Series between the San Francisco Giants and Washington Nationals, which went well into extra innings, the event was broadcast on FX instead.

A few months after the event, it was revealed that Pedro Munhoz tested positive for elevated levels of testosterone after his win against Jerrod Sanders. Munhoz's camp requested testing documentation and didn't receive it until three months later. He said a review of the results by anti-doping specialist Paul Scott determined that his testosterone was not, in fact, elevated, coming in at 850 ng/mL, or on the high end of the normal range for men his age. He admitted to using two supplements allowed by the UFC that may have elevated his testosterone, but not outside the legal limit. On November 4, 2015, Munhoz was suspended for one year retroactive to his fight and his win was changed to a no-contest.

== Results ==
Main Card (FX)
Weight class				Method	Round	Time	Notes
Welterweight	Rory MacDonald	def.	Tarec Saffiedine	TKO (punches)	3	1:28
Bantamweight	Raphael Assunção	def.	Bryan Caraway	Decision (unanimous) (30–27, 30–27, 30–27)	3	5:00
Lightweight	Chad Laprise	def.	Yosdenis Cedeno	Decision (unanimous) (30–27, 30–27, 30–27)	3	5:00
Middleweight	Elias Theodorou	def.	Bruno Santos	Decision (unanimous) (29–28, 29–28, 29–28)	3	5:00
Welterweight	Nordine Taleb	def.	Li Jingliang	Decision (split) (28–29, 29–28, 30–27)	3	5:00
Bantamweight	Mitch Gagnon	def.	Roman Salazar	Submission (rear-naked choke)	1	2:06
Preliminary card (Fox Sports 2)
Lightweight	Daron Cruickshank	def.	Anthony Njokuani	Decision (unanimous) (30–27, 30–27, 30–27)	3	5:00
Lightweight	Olivier Aubin-Mercier	def.	Jake Lindsey	Submission (inverted triangle kimura)	2	3:22
Lightweight	Paul Felder	def.	Jason Saggo	Decision (split) (29–28, 28–29, 29–28)	3	5:00
Flyweight	Chris Kelades	def.	Paddy Holohan	Decision (unanimous) (29–28, 29–28, 29–28)	3	5:00
Preliminary card (UFC Fight Pass)
Welterweight	Albert Tumenov	def.	Matt Dwyer	TKO (head kick and punch)	1	1:03
Bantamweight	Pedro Munhoz	vs.	Jerrod Sanders	No Contest (overturned)	1	0:39	(Note: Originally a submission (guillotine choke) win for Munhoz; Overturned after he tested positive for exogenous origin of testosterone metabolites.)

== Bonus awards ==
The following fighters received $50,000 bonuses:

- Fight of the Night: Patrick Holohan vs. Chris Kelades
- Performance of the Night: Rory MacDonald and Olivier Aubin-Mercier

== See also ==
- List of UFC events
- 2014 in UFC
