= UFC Fight Night: Machida vs. Mousasi =

UFC mixed martial arts event in 2014

- The poster for UFC Fight Night: Machida vs. Mousasi
- Promotion: Ultimate Fighting Championship
- Date: February 15, 2014
- Venue: Arena Jaraguá
- City: Jaraguá do Sul, Brazil
- Attendance: 7,511
- Estimated viewers: 1,400,000

Event chronology
UFC 169: Barao vs. Faber 2	UFC Fight Night: Machida vs. Mousasi	UFC 170: Rousey vs. McMann

UFC Fight Night: Machida vs. Mousasi (also known as UFC Fight Night 36) was a mixed martial arts event held on February 15, 2014, at the Arena Jaraguá in Jaraguá do Sul, Brazil. The event was broadcast live on Fox Sports 1.

== Background ==
The event was headlined by a middleweight bout between former world champions Lyoto Machida and Gegard Mousasi.

Returning veteran Nate Loughran was expected to face Erick Silva at the event. However, Loughran was forced out of the bout with an injury and was replaced by promotional newcomer Takenori Sato.

Zubaira Tukhugov was expected to face Thiago Tavares at this event. However, Tavares was forced to pull out due to an undisclosed injury, and was replaced by UFC newcomer Douglas Silva de Andrade.

This event was the first one to feature the new post-fight bonus structure. Fight of the Night bonuses remained, while the Submission of the Night and Knockout of the Night were both replaced by two Performance of the Night bonuses. They were awarded to fighters who display "the two best individual performances on the card," according to a statement released by the UFC.

== Results ==
Main card (Fox Sports 1)
Weight class				Method	Round	Time	Notes
Middleweight	Lyoto Machida	def.	Gegard Mousasi	Decision (unanimous) (49–46, 50–45, 50–45)	5	5:00
Middleweight	Ronaldo Souza	def.	Francis Carmont	Decision (unanimous) (29–28, 29–28, 30–27)	3	5:00
Welterweight	Erick Silva	def.	Takenori Sato	KO (punches)	1	0:52
Welterweight	Nico Musoke	def.	Viscardi Andrade	Decision (unanimous) (29–28, 29–28, 29–28)	3	5:00
Featherweight	Charles Oliveira	def.	Andy Ogle	Submission (triangle choke)	3	2:40
Preliminary card (UFC Fight Pass)
Lightweight	Joe Proctor	def.	Cristiano Marcello	Decision (unanimous) (29–28, 30–27, 29–28)	3	5:00
Lightweight	Rodrigo Damm	def.	Ivan Jorge	Decision (unanimous) (29–28, 29–28, 29–28)	3	5:00
Lightweight	Francisco Trinaldo	def.	Jesse Ronson	Decision (split) (28–29, 29–28, 30–27)	3	5:00
Bantamweight	Iuri Alcântara	def.	Wilson Reis	Decision (split) (28–29, 30–27, 30–27)	3	5:00
Featherweight	Felipe Arantes	def.	Maximo Blanco	Decision (unanimous) (29–27, 29–27, 29–27)	3	5:00	(Note: Blanco was docked 1 point in the third round for a kick to the groin.)
Welterweight	Ildemar Alcântara	def.	Albert Tumenov	Decision (split) (28–29, 29–28, 30–27)	3	5:00
Featherweight	Zubaira Tukhugov	def.	Douglas Silva de Andrade	Decision (unanimous) (30–27, 29–28, 30–27)	3	5:00

== Bonus awards ==
The following fighters received $50,000 bonuses:

- Fight of the Night: Lyoto Machida vs. Gegard Mousasi
- Performance of the Night: Erick Silva and Charles Oliveira

== Records set ==
The event equaled the record of most decisions on a UFC card set at UFC 169, with ten decisions, but was later overtaken by UFC 263 which had eleven decisions in June 2021. The event also had a total fight time of 2:53:32, setting a new record for the longest event in UFC history, beating the previous record of 2:51:14, also set at UFC 169.

The records were later broken by UFC 263 which had fight time of 3 hours, 19 minutes and 32 seconds and eleven bouts in a UFC event.

== See also ==
- List of UFC events
- 2014 in UFC
