= UFC Fight Night: dos Anjos vs. Alvarez =

UFC mixed martial arts event in 2016

- The poster for UFC Fight Night: dos Anjos vs. Alvarez
- Promotion: Ultimate Fighting Championship
- Date: July 7, 2016
- Venue: MGM Grand Garden Arena
- City: Las Vegas, Nevada
- Attendance: 7,760
- Total gate: $690,526

Event chronology
UFC Fight Night: MacDonald vs. Thompson	UFC Fight Night: dos Anjos vs. Alvarez	The Ultimate Fighter: Team Joanna vs. Team Cláudia Finale

UFC Fight Night: dos Anjos vs. Alvarez (also known as UFC Fight Night 90) was a mixed martial arts event held on July 7, 2016 at the MGM Grand Garden Arena in Las Vegas, Nevada.

== Background ==
The event was the first of three events in as many days in Las Vegas, culminating with UFC 200. It also marked the second North American card to air live exclusively on their subscription-based digital network, UFC Fight Pass, and the first men's championship fight broadcast over that medium.

The event was headlined by a UFC Lightweight Championship bout between then-champion Rafael dos Anjos and former two-time Bellator Lightweight Champion Eddie Alvarez.

A lightweight bout between John Makdessi and Mehdi Baghdad, originally scheduled for UFC 199, was moved to this event possibly to bolster the card.

Nordine Taleb was expected to face Alan Jouban at the event, but pulled out on June 7 due to injury. He was replaced by promotional newcomer Belal Muhammad.

== Results ==
Main Card (UFC Fight Pass)
Weight class				Method	Round	Time	Notes
Lightweight	Eddie Alvarez	def.	Rafael dos Anjos (c)	TKO (punches)	1	3:49	(Note: For the UFC Lightweight Championship.)
Heavyweight	Derrick Lewis	def.	Roy Nelson	Decision (split) (29–28, 28–29, 29–28)	3	5:00
Welterweight	Alan Jouban	def.	Belal Muhammad	Decision (unanimous) (28–27, 29–28, 29–27)	3	5:00
Lightweight	Joseph Duffy	def.	Mitch Clarke	Submission (rear-naked choke)	1	0:25
Preliminary Card (UFC Fight Pass)
Welterweight	Alberto Mina	def.	Mike Pyle	KO (flying knee and punches)	2	1:17
Lightweight	John Makdessi	def.	Mehdi Baghdad	Decision (split) (28–29, 29–28, 29–28)	3	5:00
Bantamweight	Anthony Birchak	def.	Dileno Lopes	Decision (split) (27–30, 29–28, 29–28)	3	5:00
Bantamweight	Pedro Munhoz	def.	Russell Doane	Submission (guillotine choke)	1	2:08
Bantamweight	Felipe Arantes	def.	Jerrod Sanders	Submission (armbar)	2	1:39
Lightweight	Gilbert Burns	def.	Łukasz Sajewski	Submission (armbar)	1	4:57
Bantamweight	Marco Beltrán	def.	Reginaldo Vieira	Submission (rear-naked choke)	2	3:04
Welterweight	Vicente Luque	def.	Álvaro Herrera	Submission (D'Arce choke)	2	3:52

== Bonus awards ==
The following fighters were awarded $50,000 bonuses:

- Fight of the Night: Alan Jouban vs. Belal Muhammad
- Performance of the Night: Eddie Alvarez and Pedro Munhoz

== Reported payout ==
The following is the reported payout to the fighters as reported to the Nevada State Athletic Commission. It does not include sponsor money and also does not include the UFC's traditional "fight night" bonuses.

- Eddie Alvarez: $150,000 (no win bonus) def. Rafael dos Anjos: $310,000
- Derrick Lewis: $66,000 (includes $33,000 win bonus) def. Roy Nelson: $100,000
- Alan Jouban: $42,000 (includes $24,000 win bonus) def. Belal Muhammad: $12,000
- Joseph Duffy: $40,000 (includes $20,000 win bonus) def. Mitch Clarke: $12,000
- Alberto Mina: $24,000 (includes $12,000 win bonus) def. Mike Pyle: $55,000
- John Makdessi: $60,000 (includes $30,000 win bonus) def. Mehdi Baghdad: $12,000
- Anthony Birchak: $24,000 (includes $12,000 win bonus) def. Dileno Lopes: $12,000
- Pedro Munhoz: $34,000 (includes $17,000 win bonus) def. Russell Doane: $11,000
- Felipe Arantes: $42,000 (includes $21,000 win bonus) def. Jerrod Sanders: $12,000
- Gilbert Burns: $34,000 (includes $17,000 win bonus) def. Łukasz Sajewski: $10,000
- Marco Beltran: $24,000 (includes $12,000 win bonus) def. Reginaldo Vieira: $17,000
- Vicente Luque: $24,000 (includes $12,000 win bonus) def. Álvaro Herrera: $12,000

== See also ==
- List of UFC events
- 2016 in UFC
