= Marcos Vinicius (fighter) =

Brazilian mixed martial artist (born 1979)

- Born: Marcos Vinicius Borges Pancini; December 5, 1979 (age 46); São José dos Pinhais, Brazil
- Other names: Vina
- Height: 5 ft 9 in (1.75 m)
- Weight: 125 lb (57 kg; 8.9 st)
- Division: Flyweight (125 lb); Bantamweight (135 lb); Featherweight (145 lb)
- Reach: 68.5 in (174 cm)
- Fighting out of: Curitiba, Brazil
- Team: Striker's House
- Years active: 2008–present

Mixed martial arts record
- Total: 36
- Wins: 24
- By knockout: 9
- By submission: 15
- Losses: 11
- By knockout: 7
- By submission: 1
- By decision: 3
- Draws: 1

Other information
- Mixed martial arts record from Sherdog

Marcos Vinicius Borges Pancini (born December 5, 1979) is a Brazilian mixed martial artist who formerly competed in the bantamweight division of the Ultimate Fighting Championship. Vinicius was a competitor on The Ultimate Fighter: Brazil.

== Mixed martial arts career ==
=== The Ultimate Fighter ===
In March 2012, it was revealed that Vinicius was selected to be a participant on The Ultimate Fighter: Brazil. He defeated Pedro Nobre via TKO in the first round to move into the Ultimate Fighter house, and become an official cast member.

Vina was selected as the fifth pick by Wanderlei Silva, to be a part of Team Wanderlei. In the first round of the tournament he was selected to fight Hugo Viana of Team Vitor. After two close rounds, Vina lost via unanimous decision.

After Team Vitor went 7–1, Dana White demanded the teams being scrambled in order to make it a fair contest. Vina was selected by Wanderlei to go to Team Vitor. Godofredo Pepey was selected to fight Strikeforce veteran Rodrigo Damm in the first semi-final fight. However, after the doctors removed Damm from the competition, and Vina stepped in to replace Damm and fight Castro. Vina lost the fight via second round submission.

=== Ultimate Fighting Championship ===
Vina made his UFC debut on June 23, 2012, at UFC 147 against Wagner Campos. He won the bout via TKO in the 3rd round, earning a Knockout of the Night bonus in the process.

Vinicius faced Johnny Bedford in a bantamweight bout on December 15, 2012, at The Ultimate Fighter: Team Carwin vs. Team Nelson Finale. He lost the fight via TKO in the second round.

Vinicius was expected to face Yuri Alcantara on May 18, 2013, at UFC on FX 8. However, Vinicius was forced out of the bout citing an injury.

Vinicius faced promotional newcomer Ali Bagautinov in a flyweight bout on September 4, 2013, at UFC Fight Night 28. After a back-and-forth first two rounds, Vinicius lost the fight via TKO in the third round, and was released from the promotion shortly after.

=== Post-UFC Career ===
Vinicius fought Taiyo Nakahara at Rebel Fighting Championship 1 on December 21, 2013. He lost by first-round TKO . Vinicius then faced Anderson Berlingeri at Talent MMA Circuit 6 on February 22, 2014. He lost the fight via first-round KO.

== Championships and Accomplishments ==
=== Mixed martial arts ===
- Ultimate Fighting Championship
  - Knockout of the Night (One time) vs. Wagner Campos

== Mixed martial arts record ==
Professional record breakdown
36 matches	24 wins	11 losses
By knockout	9	7
By submission	15	1
By decision	0	3
Draws	1	

Res.	Record	Opponent	Method	Event	Date	Round	Time	Location	Notes
Win	24–11–1	Rafael Kobinski	Submission (anaconda choke)	Adventure Fighters Tournament: Explosion	August 26, 2017	2	2:41	Curitiba, Paraná, Brazil	
Loss	23–11–1	Rafael Correa	Submission (calf slicer)	Imortal FC 6	December 10, 2016	1	3:14	Curitiba, Paraná, Brazil	
Loss	23–10–1	Adlan Bataev	TKO (punches)	ACB 31: Magomedsharipov vs. Arapkhanov	March 9, 2016	2	4:25	Grozny, Chechnya, Russia	
Loss	23–9–1	Sidney Lessa de Oliveira	Decision (unanimous)	Frontline Fight Series: Vina vs. Junior Abedi	September 19, 2015	3	5:00	São José dos Pinhais, Paraná, Brazil	
Win	23–8–1	Eneas Gonçalves	TKO (punches)	Imortal FC 1	June 13, 2015	1	0:51	Paraná, Brazil	
Win	22–8–1	Luiz Antonio	Submission (armbar)	CTF 9: The Return	March 1, 2015	2	4:32	Paraná, Brazil	
Win	21–8–1	Jorge Yahari	TKO (punches)	Striker's House Cup 42	September 27, 2014	2	0:52	Paraná, Brazil	Return to Featherweight.
Loss	20–8–1	Jae Hoon Moon	TKO (kick to the body)	Road FC: Road Fighting Championship 18	August 30, 2014	1	2:30	Seoul, South Korea	
Loss	20–7–1	Anderson Berlingeri	KO (punch)	Talent MMA Circuit 6	February 22, 2014	1	3:43	Curitiba, Brazil	
Loss	20–6–1	Taiyo Nakahara	TKO (punches)	Rebel Fighting Championship 1	December 21, 2013	1	3:21	Kallang, Singapore	
Loss	20–5–1	Ali Bagautinov	TKO (punches)	UFC Fight Night: Teixeira vs. Bader	September 4, 2013	3	3:28	Belo Horizonte, Brazil	Flyweight bout
Loss	20–4–1	Johnny Bedford	KO (punches)	The Ultimate Fighter 16 Finale	December 15, 2012	2	1:00	Las Vegas, Nevada, United States	Bantamweight bout
Win	20–3–1	Wagner Campos	TKO (knees and punches)	UFC 147	June 23, 2012	3	1:04	Belo Horizonte, Brazil	Knockout of the Night
Win	19–3–1	Francisco Cylderlan Lima da Silva	TKO (punches)	WFE 10	September 16, 2011	2	2:04	Salvador, Brazil	
Win	18–3–1	Rafael Mello	TKO (punches)	Brazilian Fight League 12	August 13, 2011	3	0:58	Curitiba, Brazil	
Win	17–3–1	Jose Borrome	Submission (triangle choke)	Octagono Espartano 3	December 15, 2010	2	2:55	Pampatar, Venezuela	
Loss	16–3–1	Fernando Duarte Guerra	Decision (unanimous)	Brave FC: Challenge	September 26, 2010	3	5:00	Curitiba, Brazil	
Win	16–2–1	Diego Santos	Submission (rear naked choke)	Power Fight Extreme 3	August 7, 2010	1	2:12	Curitiba, Brazil	
Win	15–2–1	Rafael Fagundes Machado	Submission (rear naked choke)	Samurai FC 3	April 25, 2010	1	2:34	Curitiba, Brazil	
Win	14–2–1	Andre Luis	TKO (punches)	Samurai FC 3	April 25, 2010	1	3:40	Curitiba, Brazil	
Win	13–2–1	Andre Luis	Submission (guillotine choke)	Power Fight Extreme 2	March 13, 2010	1	2:23	Curitiba, Brazil	
Win	12–2–1	Rafael Fagundes Machado	Submission (armbar)	Brazilian Fight League 5	December 19, 2009	1	N/A	Curitiba, Brazil	
Win	11–2–1	Edmilson Souza	Submission (rear naked choke)	Samurai FC 2	December 12, 2009	1	1:26	Curitiba, Brazil	
Draw	10–2–1	Rogelson Henrique Silveira	Draw	Torneio Estimulo	November 20, 2009	3	5:00	Curitiba, Brazil	
Loss	10–2	Erick Carlos Silva	Decision (unanimous)	Brazilian Fight League 4	November 7, 2009	3	5:00	Curitiba, Brazil	
Win	10–1	Diego Marlon	Submission (rear naked choke)	Brazilian Fight League 3	September 26, 2009	1	3:10	São José dos Pinhais, Brazil	
Win	9–1	Laerte Laio	Submission (armbar)	Samurai FC	September 12, 2009	1	1:44	Curitiba, Brazil	
Win	8–1	Diego Bataglia	TKO (punches)	Torneio Estimulo: First Round	June 7, 2009	1	2:54	São Paulo, Brazil	
Win	7–1	Kamikase Kamikase	TKO (corner stoppage)	Brazilian Fight League 1	May 17, 2009	1	5:00	Curitiba, Brazil	
Loss	6–1	Wagner Gavea	KO (slam)	Brave FC 1	December 6, 2008	1	2:25	Curitiba, Brazil	
Win	6–0	Diego Mercurio	Submission (triangle choke)	Fight Planet 2	November 18, 2008	1	1:48	São Mateus do Sul, Brazil	
Win	5–0	Jose Carlos Soares	Submission (armbar)	Champions Fight Grand Prix	August 16, 2008	1	N/A	Curitiba, Brazil	
Win	4–0	Marcos Oliveira	Submission	Champions Fight Grand Prix	August 16, 2008	2	N/A	Curitiba, Brazil	
Win	3–0	Alexandre Jacare	Submission (armbar)	Champions Fight Grand Prix	August 16, 2008	2	N/A	Curitiba, Brazil	
Win	2–0	Alexandre Jacare	Submission (rear naked choke)	Curitiba Top Fight 6	July 19, 2008	1	N/A	Curitiba, Brazil	
Win	1–0	Orestes Betran	TKO (punches)	Champions Fight	June 14, 2008	1	N/A	Curitiba, Brazil	
