= Mirsad Bektić =

Bosnian Muslim mixed martial arts (MMA) fighter

- Born: February 16, 1991 (age 35); Srebrenica, SR Bosnia, SFR Yugoslavia (now Bosnia and Herzegovina)
- Nationality: American
- Height: 5 ft 8 in (1.73 m)
- Weight: 145 lb (66 kg; 10 st 5 lb)
- Division: Lightweight; Featherweight
- Reach: 70 in (178 cm)
- Fighting out of: Montreal, Quebec, Canada
- Team: American Top Team (2011–2017); Tristar Gym (2017–2021); Relentless MMA
- Years active: 2011–2021

Mixed martial arts record
- Total: 17
- Wins: 13
- By knockout: 6
- By submission: 3
- By decision: 4
- Losses: 4
- By knockout: 2
- By submission: 1
- By decision: 1

Other information
- Mixed martial arts record from Sherdog

Mirsad Bektić was born in Bosnia and Herzegovina, former Yugoslavia (February 16, 1991). Raised in the United States from the age of nine, where he later went on to compete in the Featherweight division of the Ultimate Fighting Championship (UFC) ranking 7th in 2018 after defeating Ricardo Lamas.

== Background ==
Mirsad Bektić was born on February 16, 1991, to Bosnian Muslim parents in the eastern Bosnian town of Srebrenica in the Socialist Federal Republic of Yugoslavia (present-day Bosnia and Herzegovina) amid the breakup of Yugoslavia. At the age of fourteen months, he relocated to Italy with his mother Suada and his siblings fleeing the Bosnian War, a conflict which claimed the lives of his maternal grandparents and several relatives. The family moved again for a five-year stay in Germany. Bektić moved to the United States at age nine, where his family settled in Lincoln, Nebraska. He has two older brothers and a younger half sister. Bektić went to Irving Middle School, and graduated from Lincoln Southeast High School. He began training in karate at the age of 11 and later boxed for one and a half years at 14 years old before transitioning to mixed martial arts in 2008.

== Mixed martial arts career ==
=== Early career ===
Bektić made his professional debut in 2011, competing primarily in regional promotions across the Central United States where he compiled an undefeated record of 7–0 before signing with the UFC in early 2014. Prior to being signed by the UFC, Bektić was touted by notable publication BloodyElbow.com who listed Bektić at #1 in its "MMA's Top 25 Prospects" list in 2014.

=== Ultimate Fighting Championship ===
Bektić made his promotional debut against fellow newcomer Chas Skelly on April 19, 2014, at UFC on Fox 11. Bektić won the back and forth fight via majority decision. The fight was nearly stopped in the second round as Skelly landed a pair of illegal knees as Bektić was grounded against the cage, prompting the referee to deduct a point and allow him five minutes to recover. Bektić clearly was hurt and wobbled as he returned to his feet but was able to continue after a brief break.

Bektić was expected to face Ernest Chavez on August 23, 2014, at UFC Fight Night 49. However, Chavez was forced out of the bout with an injury and was replaced by Max Holloway. In turn, Bektić pulled out of the bout in the week leading up to the event and was replaced by promotional newcomer Clay Collard.

Bektić was expected to face Alan Omer on January 24, 2015, at UFC on Fox 14. However, Omer pulled out of the fight with an undisclosed injury and replaced by promotional newcomer Paul Redmond. Bektić won the one-sided fight via unanimous decision.

Bektić was expected to face Renato Moicano on May 30, 2015, at UFC Fight Night 67. However, Moicano pulled out of the fight in late April and was replaced by Lucas Martins. Bektić won the fight via TKO in the second round.

Bektić was expected to face Tatsuya Kawajiri on December 11, 2015, at The Ultimate Fighter 22 Finale. However, Bektić pulled out of the fight on November 27 citing injury.

Bektić was expected to face Arnold Allen on October 8, 2016, at UFC 204. However, Allen pulled out of the fight citing injury and was replaced by Russell Doane. He won the fight via submission in the first round.

Bektić faced Darren Elkins on March 4, 2017, at UFC 209. Despite completely dominating the first two rounds, he lost the fight by knockout due to punches and a head kick.

Bektić faced Godofredo Pepey on January 27, 2018, at UFC on Fox 27. He won the fight in the first round via body punch. This win earned him a Performance of the Night bonus.

Bektić faced Ricardo Lamas on June 9, 2018, at UFC 225. He won the fight by split decision.

Bektić was scheduled to face Renato Moicano on December 8, 2018, at UFC 231, however on November 15, 2018, it was reported that Bektić was forced to pull out of the bout due to an undisclosed injury.

Bektić faced Josh Emmett on July 13, 2019, at UFC Fight Night 155. He lost the fight via technical knockout in round one.

Bektić faced Dan Ige on February 8, 2020, at UFC 247. He lost the fight via a split decision.

Bektić was scheduled to face Luiz Eduardo Garagorri on September 26, 2020, at UFC Fight Night 178. However on September 15, Garagorri was pulled from the fight after testing positive for COVID-19. Returning veteran Damon Jackson would step up to face Bektić. He lost the fight via a submission in round three.

On July 13, 2021, Bektić announced his retirement from MMA.

== Championships and accomplishments ==
=== Mixed martial arts ===
- Ultimate Fighting Championship
  - Performance of the Night (One time) vs. Godofredo Pepey
- CBS Sports
  - 2017 #2 Ranked UFC Fight of the Year vs. Darren Elkins at UFC 209
- MMA Junkie
  - 2017 #4 Ranked Fight of the Year vs. Darren Elkins at UFC 209

== Mixed martial arts record ==
Professional record breakdown
17 matches	13 wins	4 losses
By knockout	6	2
By submission	3	1
By decision	4	1

Res.	Record	Opponent	Method	Event	Date	Round	Time	Location	Notes
Loss	13–4	Damon Jackson	Submission (guillotine choke)	UFC Fight Night: Covington vs. Woodley	September 19, 2020	3	1:21	Las Vegas, Nevada, United States	
Loss	13–3	Dan Ige	Decision (split)	UFC 247	February 8, 2020	3	5:00	Houston, Texas, United States	
Loss	13–2	Josh Emmett	TKO (punches)	UFC Fight Night: de Randamie vs. Ladd	July 13, 2019	1	4:25	Sacramento, California, United States	
Win	13–1	Ricardo Lamas	Decision (split)	UFC 225	June 9, 2018	3	5:00	Chicago, Illinois, United States	
Win	12–1	Godofredo Pepey	TKO (punch to the body)	UFC on Fox: Jacaré vs. Brunson 2	January 27, 2018	1	2:47	Charlotte, North Carolina, United States	Performance of the Night.
Loss	11–1	Darren Elkins	KO (punches)	UFC 209	March 4, 2017	3	3:19	Las Vegas, Nevada, United States	
Win	11–0	Russell Doane	Submission (rear-naked choke)	UFC 204	October 8, 2016	1	4:22	Manchester, England	
Win	10–0	Lucas Martins	TKO (punches)	UFC Fight Night: Condit vs. Alves	May 30, 2015	2	0:30	Goiânia, Brazil	
Win	9–0	Paul Redmond	Decision (unanimous)	UFC on Fox: Gustafsson vs. Johnson	January 24, 2015	3	5:00	Stockholm, Sweden	Catchweight (149 lb) bout; Redmond missed weight.
Win	8–0	Chas Skelly	Decision (majority)	UFC on Fox: Werdum vs. Browne	April 19, 2014	3	5:00	Orlando, Florida, United States	
Win	7–0	Joe Pearson	TKO (punches)	VFC 41	December 14, 2013	1	1:32	Ralston, Nebraska, United States	
Win	6–0	Nick Macias	TKO (punches)	RFA 7: Thatch vs. Rhodes	March 22, 2013	1	1:57	Broomfield, Colorado, United States	
Win	5–0	Doug Jenkins	Decision (unanimous)	RFA 5: Downing vs. Rinaldi	November 30, 2012	3	5:00	Kearney, Nebraska, United States	
Win	4–0	Willie Mack	TKO (punches)	Titan FC 22	May 25, 2012	2	0:27	Kansas City, Kansas, United States	Lightweight bout.
Win	3–0	Cody Carrillo	Submission (rear-naked choke)	Titan FC 21	March 2, 2012	3	3:12	Kansas City, Kansas, United States	
Win	2–0	Derek Rhoads	TKO (punches)	VFC 36	October 15, 2011	1	1:31	Council Bluffs, Iowa, United States	
Win	1–0	Shane Hutchinson	Submission (punches)	VFC 35	July 30, 2011	1	0:31	Council Bluffs, Iowa, United States	

== Amateur mixed martial arts record ==
Amateur record breakdown		
4 matches	4 wins	0 losses
By knockout	3	0
By submission	1	0

Res.	Record	Opponent	Method	Event	Date	Round	Time	Location	Notes
Win	4–0	Mac Bailey	TKO (punches)	Titan FC 16	January 28, 2011	3	1:17	Kansas City, Kansas, United States	
Win	3–0	Chad Zurfluh	Submission (punches)	VFC 31	April 23, 2010	1	1:28	Council Bluffs, Iowa, United States	
Win	2–0	Jason Russell	TKO (punches)	VFC 30	February 5, 2010	1	2:06	Council Bluffs, Iowa, United States	
Win	1–0	Zac Chavez	TKO (punches)	Featherweight Grand Prix Final Round	September 12, 2009	2	2:03	Denver, Colorado, United States	

== See also ==
- List of male mixed martial artists
