= UFC 134 =

UFC mixed martial arts event in 2011

UFC 134: Silva vs. Okami
- The poster for UFC 134: Silva vs. Okami
- Promotion: Ultimate Fighting Championship
- Date: August 27, 2011
- Venue: HSBC Arena
- City: Rio de Janeiro, Brazil
- Attendance: 14,000
- Buyrate: 335,000

Event chronology
UFC Live: Hardy vs. Lytle	UFC 134: Silva vs. Okami	UFC Fight Night: Shields vs. Ellenberger

UFC 134: Silva vs. Okami (also known as UFC Rio) was a mixed martial arts (MMA) pay-per-view event held by the Ultimate Fighting Championship on August 27, 2011, at the HSBC Arena in Rio de Janeiro, Brazil. The event was the second that the UFC has hosted in Brazil, since 1998's UFC 17.5: Ultimate Brazil. UFC 134 was awarded the 2011 event of the year by Sherdog.

== Background ==
UFC 1, 2, and 4 Tournament winner Royce Gracie was briefly linked to the event, but the rumors were refuted by UFC president Dana White.

Maiquel Falcão was scheduled to take on Tom Lawlor at this event, but was released from the promotion in regard to a 2002 assault charge. Lawlor was instead moved to UFC 139 to take on Chris Weidman.

Mackens Semerzier was expected to face Iuri Alcântara at the event, but was replaced by UFC newcomer Antonio Carvalho. However, Carvalho was forced out of the bout with an injury and replaced by newcomer Felipe Arantes.

Alexandre Ferreira was expected to face Rousimar Palhares at this event. However, Ferreira was forced out of the bout with an injury and replaced by Dan Miller.

Mike Swick was scheduled to make his return against debuting Erick Silva on this card. However, Swick had to withdraw from the bout due to a knee injury and was replaced by Luis Ramos.

This event was awarded Sherdog's 2011 Event of the Year.

== Broadcasting ==
UFC 134 featured two preliminary fights live on Spike TV in the US. The UFC 134 Live Prelims aired on Spike TV and were simultaneously broadcast on the digital sign above the Doubletree Hotel in the "Little Brazil" section of Times Square in New York City.

The entire card, including preliminary fights, was broadcast in Brazil through Pay-per-view channel Globosat Combate, and the main card was also broadcast by RedeTV!, marking the UFC's Brazilian broadcast television debut. Joe Rogan did not do commentary for this event because of a prior commitment. Kenny Florian substituted as a commentator instead.

== Results ==
Main card
Weight class				Method	Round	Time	Notes
Middleweight	Anderson Silva (c)	def.	Yushin Okami	TKO (punches)	2	2:04	(Note: For the UFC Middleweight Championship)
Light Heavyweight	Maurício Rua	def.	Forrest Griffin	KO (punches)	1	1:53
Lightweight	Edson Barboza	def.	Ross Pearson	Decision (split) (29–28, 28–29, 29–28)	3	5:00
Heavyweight	Antônio Rodrigo Nogueira	def.	Brendan Schaub	KO (punches)	1	3:09
Light Heavyweight	Stanislav Nedkov	def.	Luiz Cane	TKO (punches)	1	4:13
Preliminary card (Spike TV)
Weight class				Method	Round	Time	Notes
Lightweight	Thiago Tavares	def.	Spencer Fisher	TKO (punches)	2	2:51
Middleweight	Rousimar Palhares	def.	Dan Miller	Decision (unanimous) (29–27, 30–27, 30–25)	3	5:00
Preliminary card (Facebook)
Weight class				Method	Round	Time	Notes
Welterweight	Paulo Thiago	def.	David Mitchell	Decision (unanimous) (30–27, 30–27, 30–27)	3	5:00	(Note: This bout aired on the broadcast following the Silva vs Okami bout.)
Bantamweight	Raphael Assunção	def.	Johnny Eduardo	Decision (unanimous) (30–27, 30–27, 30–27)	3	5:00
Welterweight	Erick Silva	def.	Luis Ramos	TKO (punches)	1	0:40	(Note: This bout aired on the broadcast following the Nogueira vs Schaub bout.)
Featherweight	Iuri Alcântara	def.	Felipe Arantes	Decision (unanimous) (30–27, 30–27, 29–28)	3	5:00
Bantamweight	Yves Jabouin	def.	Ian Loveland	Decision (split) (27–30, 29–28, 29–28)	3	5:00	(Note: This bout aired on the broadcast following the Thiago vs Mitchell bout.)

== Bonus awards ==
The following fighters received $100,000 bonuses.

- Fight of the Night: Ross Pearson vs. Edson Barboza
- Knockout of the Night: Antônio Rodrigo Nogueira
- Submission of the Night: Not awarded as no matches ended by submission.

== Reported payout ==
The following is the reported payout to the fighters. It does not include sponsor money or "locker room" bonuses often given by the UFC and also do not include the UFC's traditional "fight night" bonuses

- Anderson Silva: $1,000,000 (no win bonus) def. Yushin Okami: $50,000
- Shogun Rua: $150,000 (no win bonus) def. Forrest Griffin: $125,000
- Antônio Rodrigo Nogueira: $400,000 ($150,000 win bonus) def. Brendan Schaub: $10,000
- Edson Barboza: $12,000 ($6,000 win bonus) def. Ross Pearson: $20,000
- Stanislav Nedkov: $12,000 ($6,000 win bonus) def. Luiz Cane: $19,000
- Thiago Tavares: $30,000 ($15,000 win bonus) def. Spencer Fisher: $26,000
- Rousimar Palhares: $14,000 ($7,000 win bonus) def. Dan Miller: $15,000
- Paulo Thiago: $36,000 ($18,000 win bonus) def. David Mitchell: $6,000
- Raphael Assunção: $36,000 ($18,000 win bonus) def. Johnny Eduardo: $6,000
- Erick Silva: $12,000 ($6,000 win bonus) def. Luis Ramos: $6,000
- Yuri Alcântara: $12,000 ($6,000 win bonus) def. Felipe Arantes: $6,000
- Yves Jabouin: $12,000 ($6,000 win bonus) def. Ian Loveland: $6,000
