= UFC 204 =

UFC mixed martial arts event in 2016

UFC 204: Bisping vs. Henderson 2
- The poster for UFC 204: Bisping vs. Henderson 2
- Promotion: Ultimate Fighting Championship
- Date: October 8, 2016
- Venue: Manchester Arena
- City: Manchester, England
- Attendance: 16,000
- Total gate: $1,960,000
- Buyrate: 290,000

Event chronology
UFC Fight Night: Lineker vs. Dodson	UFC 204: Bisping vs. Henderson 2	UFC Fight Night: Lamas vs. Penn

UFC 204: Bisping vs. Henderson 2 was a mixed martial arts event produced by the Ultimate Fighting Championship held on October 8, 2016, at the Manchester Arena in Manchester, England.

== Background ==
This was the fourth UFC event contested in Manchester and first PPV event held in the European/Middle East market since UFC 112.

In order for the event to be broadcast live during prime time hours on the east coast of North America, the main card was expected to begin at 3:00 am (October 9) local time in Manchester GMT, with a full preliminary card beginning at approximately 11:00 pm (October 8) local time. Despite the very late starting time, ticket demand was exceptionally high, as all tickets for the venue sold out in a matter of minutes.

The event was headlined by a UFC Middleweight Championship bout between current champion Michael Bisping and the former Pride Welterweight, Pride Middleweight and former Strikeforce Light Heavyweight Champion Dan Henderson. The pairing met previously in July 2009 at UFC 100 with Henderson taking the victory via second round highlight reel knockout.

A bantamweight bout between Brad Pickett and Iuri Alcântara was previously linked to UFC Fight Night: Arlovski vs. Barnett. However, it was contested at this event.

Ruslan Magomedov was expected to face Stefan Struve at this event, but pulled out on September 9 due to a staph infection. Struve faced Daniel Omielańczuk

Arnold Allen was expected to face Mirsad Bektić at the event. However, Allen pulled out of the fight on 29 September for undisclosed reasons. Jeremy Kennedy was briefly linked as the replacement. Subsequently, just hours after his participation was publicly confirmed, Kennedy indicated he was injured and unable to fight. Bektić faced Russell Doane.

Reza Madadi was expected to face promotional newcomer Marc Diakiese at the event. However, Madadi pulled out of the fight in the week leading up to the event citing an eye injury and was replaced by Łukasz Sajewski.

Ian Entwistle was expected to face Rob Font at the event. However, on the day prior to the event, Entwistle fell ill during the weight cutting process and the bout was scrapped.

== Results ==
Main Card
Weight class				Method	Round	Time	Notes
Middleweight	Michael Bisping (c)	def.	Dan Henderson	Decision (unanimous) (48–47, 48–47, 49–46)	5	5:00	(Note: For the UFC Middleweight Championship.)
Middleweight	Gegard Mousasi	def.	Vitor Belfort	TKO (head kick and punches)	2	2:43
Light Heavyweight	Jimi Manuwa	def.	Ovince Saint Preux	KO (punch)	2	2:38
Heavyweight	Stefan Struve	def.	Daniel Omielańczuk	Submission (D'Arce choke)	2	1:41
Featherweight	Mirsad Bektić	def.	Russell Doane	Submission (rear-naked choke)	1	4:22
Preliminary Card (Fox Sports 1)
Bantamweight	Iuri Alcântara	def.	Brad Pickett	Submission (triangle choke)	1	1:59
Bantamweight	Damian Stasiak	def.	Davey Grant	Submission (armbar)	3	3:56
Welterweight	Leon Edwards	def.	Albert Tumenov	Submission (rear-naked choke)	3	3:01
Lightweight	Marc Diakiese	def.	Łukasz Sajewski	TKO (knees and punches)	2	4:40
Preliminary Card (UFC Fight Pass)
Welterweight	Mike Perry	def.	Danny Roberts	KO (knee and punches)	3	4:40
Lightweight	Leonardo Santos	def.	Adriano Martins	Decision (split) (28–29, 29–28, 29–28)	3	5:00

== Bonus awards ==
The following fighters were awarded $50,000 bonuses:

- Fight of the Night: Michael Bisping vs. Dan Henderson
- Performance of the Night: Jimi Manuwa and Iuri Alcântara

== See also ==
- List of UFC events
- 2016 in UFC
