= UFC Fight Night: Bigfoot vs. Arlovski =

UFC mixed martial arts event in 2014

- The poster for UFC Fight Night: Bigfoot vs. Arlovski
- Promotion: Ultimate Fighting Championship
- Date: September 13, 2014
- Venue: Ginásio Nilson Nelson
- City: Brasília, Brazil
- Attendance: 8,822

Event chronology
UFC Fight Night: Jacaré vs. Mousasi	UFC Fight Night: Bigfoot vs. Arlovski	UFC Fight Night: Hunt vs. Nelson

UFC Fight Night: Bigfoot vs. Arlovski (also known as UFC Fight Night 51) was a mixed martial arts event held on September 13, 2014, at Ginásio Nilson Nelson in Brasília, Brazil.

== Background ==
The event in Brasília was the first that the organization hosted in the Brazilian capital city.

The event was headlined by a heavyweight rematch between Antônio Silva and Andrei Arlovski. Their first fight at Strikeforce: Heavy Artillery ended in a unanimous decision victory for Silva.

Mike Rhodes was expected to face Paulo Thiago at the event. However, Rhodes was forced out of the bout due to injury, and was briefly replaced by returning veteran Joe Riggs. On July 29, it was announced that Riggs had to pull out of the bout due to a gun accident with non-life-threatening injuries in his house. On the same day Sean Spencer replaced Riggs as Thiago's new opponent.

Sérgio Moraes was expected to face Santiago Ponzinibbio at the event. However, Moraes pulled out of the bout citing a lingering knee injury. He was replaced by promotional newcomer Wendell Oliveira.

Valérie Létourneau was expected to face Jéssica Andrade at the event. However, Létourneau pulled out of the bout citing an injury and was replaced by promotional newcomer and former Jungle Fight women's bantamweight champion Larissa Pacheco.

Promotional newcomer Łukasz Sajewski was expected to make his debut at the event against Leonardo Santos. Sajewski was removed from the card and Santos faced Efraín Escudero. While Escudero's initial opponent Francisco Trinaldo faced Leandro Silva.

== Results ==
Main card (UFC Fight Pass)
Weight class				Method	Round	Time	Notes
Heavyweight	Andrei Arlovski	def.	Antonio Silva	KO (punches)	1	2:59
Lightweight	Gleison Tibau	def.	Piotr Hallmann	Decision (split) (28–29, 29–28, 29–28)	3	5:00
Lightweight	Leonardo Santos	def.	Efraín Escudero	Decision (unanimous) (29–28, 29–28, 29–28)	3	5:00
Welterweight	Santiago Ponzinibbio	def.	Wendell Oliveira	TKO (punches)	1	1:20
Bantamweight	Iuri Alcântara	def.	Russell Doane	Decision (unanimous) (29–28, 29–28, 29–28)	3	5:00
Women's Bantamweight	Jéssica Andrade	def.	Larissa Pacheco	Submission (guillotine choke)	1	4:33
Preliminary card (UFC Fight Pass)
Featherweight	Godofredo Pepey	def.	Dashon Johnson	Submission (triangle armbar)	1	4:29
Welterweight	George Sullivan	def.	Igor Araújo	KO (punches)	2	2:31
Lightweight	Francisco Trinaldo	def.	Leandro Silva	Decision (unanimous) (29–28, 29–28, 29–28)	3	5:00
Welterweight	Sean Spencer	def.	Paulo Thiago	Decision (unanimous) (30–27, 30–27, 30–27)	3	5:00
Bantamweight	Rani Yahya	def.	Johnny Bedford	Submission (kimura)	2	2:04

== Bonus awards ==
The following fighters received $50,000 bonuses:

- Fight of the Night: Gleison Tibau vs. Piotr Hallmann ^
- Performance of the Night: Andrei Arlovski and Godofredo Pepey

^ Bonus winner Piotr Hallmann had his award rescinded after testing positive for drostanolone during his post fight drug screening.

== See also ==
- List of UFC events
- 2014 in UFC
