= Pedro Munhoz =

Brazilian mixed martial artist (born 1986)

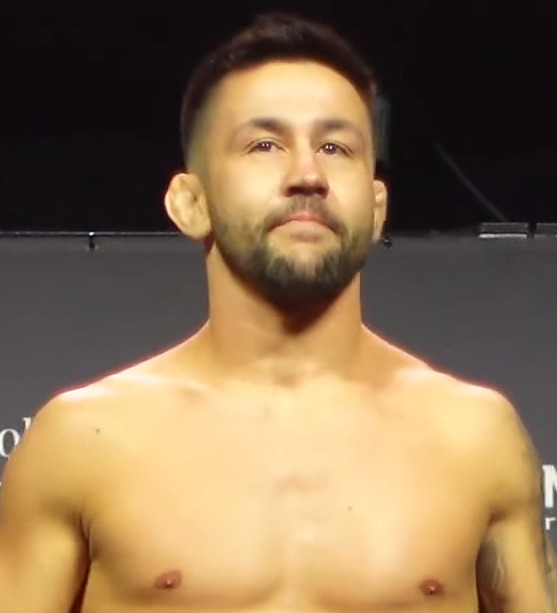
- Munhoz at UFC 269 in 2021
- Born: Pedro Henrique Lopes Munhoz; September 7, 1986 (age 40); São Paulo, Brazil
- Nickname: The Young Punisher
- Height: 5 ft 6 in (1.68 m)
- Weight: 135 lb (61 kg; 9.6 st)
- Division: Bantamweight
- Reach: 65 in (165 cm)
- Fighting out of: Coconut Creek, Florida, U.S.
- Team: Kings MMA (2010–2017); American Top Team (2017–present)
- Rank: Black belt in Brazilian Jiu-Jitsu under Rubens "Cobrinha" Charles and Marco Barbosa; Brown belt in Judo
- Years active: 2009–present

Mixed martial arts record
- Total: 32
- Wins: 20
- By knockout: 5
- By submission: 8
- By decision: 7
- Losses: 10
- By decision: 10
- No contests: 2

Other information
- Mixed martial arts record from Sherdog

Pedro Henrique Lopes Munhoz (born September 7, 1986) is a Brazilian professional mixed martial artist who competed in the Bantamweight division of the Ultimate Fighting Championship (UFC). He is the former Bantamweight Champion of Resurrection Fighting Alliance.

== Background ==
Munhoz began training Shotokan karate at the age of six, picking up judo a couple of years later before starting to train Brazilian jiu-jitsu at the age of 13.

== Mixed martial arts career ==
=== Early career ===
A professional since 2009, Munhoz began his career competing in local promotions in his native São Paulo, Brazil before moving to the United States in 2011. He competed in several regional promotions across the United States, compiling an undefeated record and eventually became Resurrection Fighting Alliance bantamweight champion on August 16, 2013, after defeating notable veteran Jeff Curran by split decision. Munhoz defended his title for the first time on January 24, 2014, defeating Billy Daniels via first round submission. After the victory over Daniels, Munhoz signed with the UFC in early February 2014.

=== Ultimate Fighting Championship ===
==== 2014 ====
Munhoz made his promotional debut on February 22, 2014, as a short notice replacement for an injured Francisco Rivera and faced top contender Raphael Assunção at UFC 170. Assunção defeated Munhoz via unanimous decision.

Munhoz faced promotional newcomer Matt Hobar on May 31, 2014, at The Ultimate Fighter Brazil 3 Finale. Munhoz defeated Hobar via first round TKO.

Munhoz faced Jerrod Sanders on October 4, 2014, at UFC Fight Night 54. He won the fight via submission in the first round. A few months later, it was revealed that Munhoz tested positive for elevated levels of testosterone. Munhoz's camp requested testing documentation and didn't receive it until three months later. He said a review of the results by anti-doping specialist Paul Scott determined that his testosterone was not, in fact, elevated, coming in at 850 ng/mL, or on the high end of the normal range for men his age. He admitted to using two supplements allowed by the UFC that may have elevated his testosterone, but not outside the legal limit. On November 4, 2015, Munhoz was suspended for one year retroactive to his fight due to testosterone metabolites of an exogenous origin and his win was changed to a no-contest.

==== 2015 ====
Munhoz faced Jimmie Rivera on November 7, 2015, at UFC Fight Night 77. He lost the fight via split decision.

==== 2016 ====
Munhoz next faced Russell Doane on July 7, 2016, at UFC Fight Night: dos Anjos vs. Alvarez. He won the fight via submission in the first round and was awarded a Performance of the Night bonus.

Munhoz faced Justin Scoggins on November 19, 2016, at UFC Fight Night 100. He won the bout submission in the second round and was awarded a Performance of the Night bonus.

==== 2017 ====
Munhoz faced Damian Stasiak on May 28, 2017, at UFC Fight Night: Gustafsson vs. Teixeira. He won the fight by unanimous decision.

Munhoz faced Rob Font on October 28, 2017, at UFC Fight Night: Brunson vs. Machida. He won the fight via submission in round one. This win earned him a Performance of the Night bonus award.

==== 2018 ====
Munhoz was expected to face John Dodson at UFC Fight Night: Machida vs. Anders on February 3, 2018. However, Munhoz missed weight by four pounds over the bantamweight non title fight upper limit of 136 pounds, and Dodson declined to take the fight and the fight was cancelled. The fight was rescheduled to UFC 222 on March 3, 2018. Munhoz lost the fight via split decision.

Munhoz faced Brett Johns August 4, 2018, at UFC 227. He won the fight by unanimous decision after knocking Johns down several times during the bout.

Munhoz faced Bryan Caraway on November 30, 2018, at The Ultimate Fighter 28 Finale. He won the fight via technical knockout in round one.

==== 2019 ====
Munhoz faced former UFC Bantamweight Champion Cody Garbrandt on March 2, 2019, at UFC 235. He won the fight via knockout in the first round. The win also earned Munhoz his first Fight of the Night bonus award.

Munhoz faced Aljamain Sterling on June 8, 2019, at UFC 238. He lost the fight by unanimous decision.

==== 2020 ====
Munhoz was scheduled to face former UFC Lightweight Champion Frankie Edgar on July 15, 2020, at UFC on ESPN: Kattar vs. Ige. However, on July 6, it was announced that Munhoz was pulled from the bout after testing positive for COVID-19. The pairing was redscheduled and took place on August 22, 2020, at UFC on ESPN 15. Munhoz lost the back-and-forth fight via split decision. 19 out of 23 media outlets scored the bout for Munhoz. This fight earned him the Fight of the Night award.

==== 2021 ====
A rematch against Jimmie Rivera was scheduled on January 30, 2021, at UFC on ESPN 20. On December 26, 2020, it was announced that the bout was moved to January 20, 2021, at UFC on ESPN 20. The pairing was rescheduled once again in early January as they were moved to UFC 258 on February 13, 2021, due to undisclosed reasons. During the week leading up to the event, the bout was delayed again due to a positive COVID-19 test for someone within the two camps. The pairing remained intact and took place two weeks later at UFC Fight Night: Rozenstruik vs. Gane. Munhoz won the fight via unanimous decision. This bout earned him a Fight of the Night bonus award.

Munhoz faced former UFC Featherweight Champion José Aldo on August 7, 2021, at UFC 265. He lost the fight via unanimous decision.

Munhoz faced former UFC Bantamweight Champion Dominick Cruz on December 11, 2021, at UFC 269. Despite knocking Cruz down twice and almost finishing him in the first round, Munhoz ultimately lost the fight via unanimous decision. The bout earned the Fight of the Night bonus award.

==== 2022 ====
Munhoz faced Sean O'Malley on July 2, 2022, at UFC 276. It was ruled a no contest in the second round due to an inadvertent eye poke that rendered Munhoz unable to continue. Following the bout, Munhoz published his medical record showing that he suffered an abrasion across his right cornea.

==== 2023 ====
Munhoz faced Chris Gutiérrez on April 15, 2023, at UFC on ESPN 44. He won the fight by unanimous decision.

Munhoz faced Marlon Vera on August 19, 2023, at UFC 292, stepping in as a replacement for an injured Henry Cejudo. He lost the fight by unanimous decision. 14 out of 17 media outlets scored the bout for Munhoz.

==== 2024 ====
Munhoz faced Kyler Phillips on March 9, 2024 at UFC 299. He lost the fight by unanimous decision.

Munhoz faced Aiemann Zahabi on November 2, 2024 at UFC Fight Night 246. He lost the fight via unanimous decision.

==== 2026 ====
On April 8, 2026, Munhoz revealed that he had requested his release from the promotion. On April 20, 2026, it was reported that Munhoz was officially removed from the UFC roster.

== Personal life ==
Munhoz has two daughters: one from a previous relationship and one with his wife, Varinea.

== Championships and accomplishments ==
- Ultimate Fighting Championship
  - Performance of the Night (Three times) vs. Russell Doane, Justin Scoggins, and Rob Font
  - Fight of the Night (Four times) vs. Cody Garbrandt, Frankie Edgar, Jimmie Rivera, and Dominick Cruz
    - Third most Post-Fight bonuses in UFC Bantamweight division history (7)
  - Second most bouts in UFC Bantamweight division history (22) (behind Marlon Vera)
  - Tied (Marlon Vera) for most decision bouts in UFC Bantamweight division history (14)
  - Third most significant strikes landed in UFC Bantamweight division history (1358)
  - Fourth most total fight time in UFC Bantamweight division history (4:12:12)
  - UFC.com Awards
    - 2019: Ranked #5 Upset of the Year vs. Cody Garbrandt & Ranked #8 Fight of the Year
    - 2020: Ranked #8 Fight of the Year vs. Frankie Edgar
- Resurrection Fighting Alliance
  - RFA Bantamweight Championship (One time)
    - One successful title defense

== Mixed martial arts record ==
Professional record breakdown
32 matches	20 wins	10 losses
By knockout	5	0
By submission	8	0
By decision	7	10
No contests	2	

Res.	Record	Opponent	Method	Event	Date	Round	Time	Location	Notes
Loss	20–10 (2)	Aiemann Zahabi	Decision (unanimous)	UFC Fight Night: Moreno vs. Albazi	November 2, 2024	3	5:00	Edmonton, Alberta, Canada	
Loss	20–9 (2)	Kyler Phillips	Decision (unanimous)	UFC 299	March 9, 2024	3	5:00	Miami, Florida, United States	
Loss	20–8 (2)	Marlon Vera	Decision (unanimous)	UFC 292	August 19, 2023	3	5:00	Boston, Massachusetts, United States	
Win	20–7 (2)	Chris Gutiérrez	Decision (unanimous)	UFC on ESPN: Holloway vs. Allen	April 15, 2023	3	5:00	Kansas City, Missouri, United States	
NC	19–7 (2)	Sean O'Malley	NC (accidental eye poke)	UFC 276	July 2, 2022	2	3:09	Las Vegas, Nevada, United States	Accidental eye poke rendered Munhoz unable to continue.
Loss	19–7 (1)	Dominick Cruz	Decision (unanimous)	UFC 269	December 11, 2021	3	5:00	Las Vegas, Nevada, United States	Fight of the Night.
Loss	19–6 (1)	José Aldo	Decision (unanimous)	UFC 265	August 7, 2021	3	5:00	Houston, Texas, United States	
Win	19–5 (1)	Jimmie Rivera	Decision (unanimous)	UFC Fight Night: Rozenstruik vs. Gane	February 27, 2021	3	5:00	Las Vegas, Nevada, United States	Fight of the Night.
Loss	18–5 (1)	Frankie Edgar	Decision (split)	UFC on ESPN: Munhoz vs. Edgar	August 22, 2020	5	5:00	Las Vegas, Nevada, United States	Fight of the Night.
Loss	18–4 (1)	Aljamain Sterling	Decision (unanimous)	UFC 238	June 8, 2019	3	5:00	Chicago, Illinois, United States	
Win	18–3 (1)	Cody Garbrandt	TKO (punches)	UFC 235	March 2, 2019	1	4:51	Las Vegas, Nevada, United States	Fight of the Night.
Win	17–3 (1)	Bryan Caraway	TKO (body kick and punches)	The Ultimate Fighter: Heavy Hitters Finale	November 30, 2018	1	2:39	Las Vegas, Nevada, United States	
Win	16–3 (1)	Brett Johns	Decision (unanimous)	UFC 227	August 4, 2018	3	5:00	Los Angeles, California, United States	
Loss	15–3 (1)	John Dodson	Decision (split)	UFC 222	March 3, 2018	3	5:00	Las Vegas, Nevada, United States	
Win	15–2 (1)	Rob Font	Submission (guillotine choke)	UFC Fight Night: Brunson vs. Machida	October 28, 2017	1	4:03	São Paulo, Brazil	Performance of the Night.
Win	14–2 (1)	Damian Stasiak	Decision (unanimous)	UFC Fight Night: Gustafsson vs. Teixeira	May 28, 2017	3	5:00	Stockholm, Sweden	
Win	13–2 (1)	Justin Scoggins	Submission (guillotine choke)	UFC Fight Night: Bader vs. Nogueira 2	November 19, 2016	2	1:55	São Paulo, Brazil	Performance of the Night.
Win	12–2 (1)	Russell Doane	Submission (guillotine choke)	UFC Fight Night: dos Anjos vs. Alvarez	July 7, 2016	1	2:08	Las Vegas, Nevada, United States	Performance of the Night.
Loss	11–2 (1)	Jimmie Rivera	Decision (split)	UFC Fight Night: Belfort vs. Henderson 3	November 7, 2015	3	5:00	São Paulo, Brazil	
NC	11–1 (1)	Jerrod Sanders	NC (overturned)	UFC Fight Night: MacDonald vs. Saffiedine	October 4, 2014	1	0:39	Halifax, Nova Scotia, Canada	Originally a submission (guillotine choke) win for Munhoz; overturned after he tested positive for exogenous origin of testosterone.
Win	11–1	Matt Hobar	TKO (punches)	The Ultimate Fighter Brazil 3 Finale: Miocic vs. Maldonado	May 31, 2014	1	2:47	São Paulo, Brazil	
Loss	10–1	Raphael Assunção	Decision (unanimous)	UFC 170	February 22, 2014	3	5:00	Las Vegas, Nevada, United States	
Win	10–0	Billy Daniels	Submission (guillotine choke)	RFA 12	January 24, 2014	1	0:41	Los Angeles, California, United States	Defended the RFA Bantamweight Championship.
Win	9–0	Jeff Curran	Decision (split)	RFA 9	August 16, 2013	5	5:00	Carson, California, United States	Won the vacant RFA Bantamweight Championship.
Win	8–0	Mitch Jackson	Submission (guillotine choke)	RFA 8	June 21, 2013	1	4:49	Milwaukee, Wisconsin, United States	
Win	7–0	Bill Kamery	Submission (heel hook)	RFA 5	November 30, 2012	1	2:27	Kearney, Nebraska, United States	
Win	6–0	Camilo Gonzalez	Submission (guillotine choke)	RITC: Respect in the Cage	July 30, 2011	2	1:21	Pomona, California, United States	
Win	5–0	Richard Montalvo	Submission (rear naked-choke)	MMA Xplosion: International Team Challenge	January 29, 2011	2	2:31	Las Vegas, Nevada, United States	
Win	4–0	Mauro Brenes	Decision (unanimous)	RITC: Respect in the Cage	October 9, 2010	3	5:00	Pomona, California, United States	
Win	3–0	Pablo Alfonso	Decision (unanimous)	Jungle Fight 18: São Paulo	March 20, 2010	3	5:00	São Paulo, Brazil	
Win	2–0	Roberto Matsumoto	TKO (retirement)	EFC: Eagle Fighting Championship	September 26, 2009	2	5:00	São Paulo, Brazil	
Win	1–0	Reginaldo Vieira	TKO (submission to punches)	FF: Full Fight 1	March 21, 2009	2	3:35	São Paulo, Brazil	

== See also ==
- List of male mixed martial artists
