= Ernest Chavez (fighter) =

American mixed martial arts fighter

- Born: June 27, 1983 (age 43); Brawley, California, United States
- Nickname: EJ
- Height: 5 ft 8 in (1.73 m)
- Weight: 155 lb (70 kg; 11.1 st)
- Division: Lightweight
- Reach: 70 in (178 cm)
- Fighting out of: Orange County, California
- Team: Titan MMA
- Years active: 2009–2015

Mixed martial arts record
- Total: 12
- Wins: 10
- By knockout: 5
- By submission: 0
- By decision: 5
- Losses: 2
- By knockout: 1
- By submission: 1
- By decision: 0

Other information
- Mixed martial arts record from Sherdog

Ernest Chavez (born June 27, 1983) is an American mixed martial artist, who formerly competed in the Featherweight division of the Ultimate Fighting Championship.

== College ==
Chavez attended California State University, San Bernardino and earned an associate degree's.

== Mixed martial arts career ==
=== Early career ===
A professional since 2009, Chavez began his career competing for several regional promotions in his native Southern California, where he compiled an undefeated record before signing with the UFC in early 2014.

=== Ultimate Fighting Championship ===
Chavez made his promotional debut on February 22, 2014, at UFC 170 where he faced fellow newcomer Yosdenis Cedeno. Chavez defeated Cedeno in a back and forth fight via split decision.

Chavez faced Elias Silvério on May 31, 2014, at The Ultimate Fighter Brazil 3 Finale. Chavez suffered the first loss of his career, as Silvério finished Chavez via submission in the third round.

Chavez was expected to drop down to featherweight and face Mirsad Bektic on August 23, 2014, at UFC Fight Night 49. However, Chavez was forced out of the bout with an injury and was replaced by Max Holloway.

Chavez faced Zubaira Tukhugov on October 4, 2014, at UFC Fight Night 53. He lost the fight via TKO in the first round, and was subsequently released from the promotion shortly after.

== Mixed martial arts record ==
Professional record breakdown
12 matches	10 wins	2 losses
By knockout	5	1
By submission	0	1
By decision	5	0

Res.	Record	Opponent	Method	Event	Date	Round	Time	Location	Notes
Win	10–2	Adam Townsend	Decision (split)	RFA 33: Townsend vs. Chavez	December 11, 2015	3	5:00	Costa Mesa, California, United States	
Win	9–2	Justin Buchholz	TKO (punches)	TWC 23 - Halloween Havoc 5	October 30, 2015	1	3:22	Porterville, California, United States	
Loss	8–2	Zubaira Tukhugov	TKO (punches)	UFC Fight Night: Nelson vs. Story	October 4, 2014	1	4:21	Stockholm, Sweden	Featherweight debut.
Loss	8–1	Elias Silvério	Submission (rear-naked choke)	The Ultimate Fighter Brazil 3 Finale: Miocic vs. Maldonado	May 31, 2014	3	4:21	São Paulo, Brazil	
Win	8–0	Yosdenis Cedeno	Decision (split)	UFC 170	February 22, 2014	3	5:00	Las Vegas, Nevada, United States	
Win	7–0	Jorge Valdez	TKO (punches)	BAMMA USA - Badbeat 9	May 31, 2013	3	4:00	Commerce, California, United States	
Win	6–0	Tom Gloudeman	KO (punches)	BAMMA USA - Badbeat 8	March 15, 2013	1	1:21	Commerce, California, United States	
Win	5–0	Josh Smith	Decision (unanimous)	FCOC - Fight Club OC	October 4, 2012	3	5:00	Costa Mesa, California, United States	
Win	4–0	Stephen Martinez	Decision (split)	LBFN 13 - Long Beach Fight Night 13	November 20, 2011	3	5:00	Long Beach, California, United States	
Win	3–0	Xavier Stokes	TKO (punches)	Fight Club OC - Night at the Fights	May 19, 2011	1	2:43	Irvine, California, United States	
Win	2–0	Brandon Jinnies	TKO (punches)	BITB - Battle in the Ballroom	August 5, 2010	1	0:44	Irvine, California, United States	
Win	1–0	Dionisio Ramirez	Decision (unanimous)	Apocalypse Fights 4 - War	June 13, 2009	3	5:00	Coachella, California, United States	
