= UFC 170 =

UFC mixed martial arts event in 2014

UFC 170: Rousey vs. McMann
- The poster for UFC 170: Rousey vs. McMann
- Promotion: Ultimate Fighting Championship
- Date: February 22, 2014
- Venue: Mandalay Bay Events Center
- City: Las Vegas, Nevada
- Attendance: 10,217
- Total gate: $1,558,870
- Buyrate: 340,000

Event chronology
UFC Fight Night: Machida vs. Mousasi	UFC 170: Rousey vs. McMann	The Ultimate Fighter China Finale: Kim vs. Hathaway

UFC 170: Rousey vs. McMann was a mixed martial arts held on February 22, 2014, at the Mandalay Bay Events Center in Las Vegas, Nevada.

The event was released on DVD on May 27, 2014. The DVD was distributed by Anchor Bay Entertainment.

== Background ==
A bout between women's bantamweight champion and former Olympian Ronda Rousey and former Olympian Sara McMann headlined the event.

A bout between Gilbert Melendez and Khabib Nurmagomedov was briefly linked to this event. The fight was later cancelled.

Lucas Martins was expected to face Bryan Caraway at this event. However, Caraway pulled out of the bout citing an injury and was replaced by UFC newcomer Aljamain Sterling. Martins ended up also getting injured and was replaced by UFC newcomer Cody Gibson.

Francisco Rivera was expected to face Raphael Assunção on this card. However, Rivera injured his hand and was forced out of the bout. He was replaced by UFC newcomer Pedro Munhoz.

A bout between Rafael dos Anjos and Rustam Khabilov was expected to take place on this card. However, the fight was cancelled due to injury.

A bout between Rashad Evans and Daniel Cormier was expected to take place on this card. However, the fight was removed from this card due to Evans suffering a knee injury during training. He was replaced by 4-0 undefeated fighter Patrick Cummins.

== Results ==
Main card
Weight class				Method	Round	Time	Notes
Women's Bantamweight	Ronda Rousey (c)	def.	Sara McMann	TKO (knee to the body)	1	1:06	(Note: For the UFC Women's Bantamweight Championship.)
Light Heavyweight	Daniel Cormier	def.	Patrick Cummins	TKO (punches)	1	1:19
Welterweight	Rory MacDonald	def.	Demian Maia	Decision (unanimous) (29–28, 29–28, 29–28)	3	5:00
Welterweight	Mike Pyle	def.	TJ Waldburger	TKO (elbows and punches)	3	4:03
Welterweight	Stephen Thompson	def.	Robert Whittaker	TKO (punches)	1	3:43
Preliminary card (Fox Sports 1)
Women's Bantamweight	Alexis Davis	def.	Jessica Eye	Decision (split) (28–29, 29–28, 29–28)	3	5:00
Bantamweight	Raphael Assunção	def.	Pedro Munhoz	Decision (unanimous) (30–27, 30–27, 30–27)	3	5:00
Bantamweight	Aljamain Sterling	def.	Cody Gibson	Decision (unanimous) (29–28, 29–28, 29–28)	3	5:00
Flyweight	Zach Makovsky	def.	Josh Sampo	Decision (unanimous) (30–27, 30–27, 29–28)	3	5:00
Preliminary card (UFC Fight Pass)
Lightweight	Erik Koch	def.	Rafaello Oliveira	TKO (punches)	1	1:24
Lightweight	Ernest Chavez	def.	Yosdenis Cedeno	Decision (split) (28–29, 29–28, 30–27)	3	5:00

== Bonus awards ==
The following fighters received $50,000 bonuses:

- Fight of the Night: Rory MacDonald vs. Demian Maia
- Performance of the Night: Ronda Rousey and Stephen Thompson

== Reported payout ==
The following is the reported payout to the fighters as reported to the Nevada State Athletic Commission. It does not include sponsor money and also does not include the UFC's traditional "fight night" bonuses.

- Ronda Rousey: $110,000 (includes $55,000 win bonus) def. Sara McMann: $16,000
- Daniel Cormier: $160,000 (includes $80,000 win bonus) def. Patrick Cummins: $8,000
- Rory MacDonald: $100,000 (includes $50,000 win bonus) def. Demian Maia: $64,000
- Mike Pyle: $96,000 (includes $48,000 win bonus) def. T.J. Waldburger: $18,000
- Stephen Thompson: $28,000 (includes $14,000 win bonus) def. Robert Whittaker: $15,000
- Alexis Davis: $30,000 (includes $15,000 win bonus) def. Jessica Eye: $8,000
- Raphael Assunção: $56,000 (includes $28,000 win bonus) def. Pedro Muhnoz: $8,000
- Aljamain Sterling: $16,000 (includes $8,000 win bonus) def. Cody Gibson: $8,000
- Zach Makovsky: $24,000 (includes $12,000 win bonus) def. Josh Sampo: $10,000
- Erik Koch: $30,000 (includes $15,000 win bonus) def. Rafaello Oliveira: $14,000
- Ernest Chavez: $16,000 (includes $8,000 win bonus) def. Yosdenis Cedeno: $8,000

== See also ==
- List of UFC events
- 2014 in UFC
