= Yosdenis Cedeno =

Cuban-American mixed martial artist

- Born: February 12, 1985 (age 41); Havana, Cuba
- Nickname: Pink Panther
- Height: 5 ft 8 in (1.73 m)
- Weight: 155 lb (70 kg; 11.1 st)
- Division: Lightweight
- Fighting out of: Miami, Florida
- Team: MMA Masters
- Rank: Black belt in Shitō-ryū Karate
- Years active: 2009–present

Mixed martial arts record
- Total: 19
- Wins: 11
- By knockout: 7
- By decision: 4
- Losses: 7
- By submission: 2
- By decision: 5
- Draws: 1

Other information
- Mixed martial arts record from Sherdog

Yosdenis Cedeno (born February 12, 1985) is a Cuban-American mixed martial artist who formerly fought in the Lightweight division in the Ultimate Fighting Championship.

== Mixed martial arts career ==
=== Early career ===
A professional since 2009, Cedeno began his career competing primarily for regional promotions in his adopted home of South Florida, where he compiled a record of 9-2 before signing with the UFC in early 2014.

=== Ultimate Fighting Championship ===
Cedeno made his promotional debut on February 22, 2014, at UFC 170 where he faced fellow newcomer Ernest Chavez. Chavez defeated Cedeno in a back and forth fight via split decision.

Cedeno faced Jerrod Sanders on July 16, 2014, at UFC Fight Night 45. Cedeno defeated Sanders via TKO after the first round as Sanders was unable to continue.

Cedeno faced Chad Laprise on October 4, 2014, at UFC Fight Night 54. Cedeno lost the fight via unanimous decision.

Cedeno faced Cody Pfister on July 11, 2015, at UFC 189. He lost the fight by unanimous decision. Following back to back losses, Cedeno was released from the promotion.

=== Post-UFC career ===
After the release, Cedeno signed with Titan FC and made his promotional debut against Jason Novelli at Titan FC 38 on April 30, 2016. The bout was ruled a draw.

He made his sophomore appearance in the promotion against Kurt Holobaugh at Titan FC 42 on December 2, 2016. He lost the fight via third-round submission.

Cedeno then faced Pedro Gomes at Underground Cage Fighting Championship 1 on July 21, 2018. He won the fight via unanimous decision.

Cedeno was scheduled to face fellow UFC veteran Michel Quiñones at Action Fight League - War at the Rock 1 on February 16, 2019. However, Quiñones withdrew from the bout and was replaced by Felipe Douglas. Cedeno lost the fight via unanimous decision.

== Bare-knuckle boxing ==
Cedeno made his debut in the sport against Alan Arzeno at BKFC 18 on June 26, 2021. He won the bout via split decision.

He made his sophomore appearance against Mario Vargas at BKFC KnuckleMania 2 on February 19, 2022. He won the fight via unanimous decision.

Cedeno fought in the main event of BKFC 35 against Gorjan Slaveski on January 27, 2023 and lost by technical knockout in the fourth round.

Cedeno faced Josh Zuckerman at BKFC 62 on June 21, 2024. He lost the bout by technical knockout in the fourth round.

== Mixed martial arts record ==
Professional record breakdown
18 matches	10 wins	7 losses
By knockout	7	0
By submission	0	2
By decision	3	5
Draws	1	

Res.	Record	Opponent	Method	Event	Date	Round	Time	Location	Notes
Loss	11–7–1	Felipe Douglas	Decision (unanimous)	Action Fight League: War at the Rock 1	February 16, 2019	3	5:00	Hollywood, Florida, United States	
Win	11–6–1	Pedro Gomes	Decision (unanimous)	Underground Cage Fighting Championship 1	July 21, 2018	3	5:00	West Palm Beach, Florida, United States	
Loss	10–6–1	Kurt Holobaugh	Submission (rear-naked choke)	Titan FC 42	December 2, 2016	3	1:22	Coral Gables, Florida, United States	
Draw	10–5–1	Jason Novelli	Draw (split)	Titan FC 38	April 30, 2016	3	5:00	Miami, Florida, United States	
Loss	10–5	Cody Pfister	Decision (unanimous)	UFC 189	July 11, 2015	3	5:00	Las Vegas, Nevada, United States	
Loss	10–4	Chad Laprise	Decision (unanimous)	UFC Fight Night: MacDonald vs. Saffiedine	October 4, 2014	3	5:00	Halifax, Nova Scotia, Canada	
Win	10–3	Jerrod Sanders	TKO (retirement)	UFC Fight Night: Cowboy vs. Miller	July 16, 2014	1	5:00	Atlantic City, New Jersey, United States	
Loss	9–3	Ernest Chavez	Decision (split)	UFC 170	February 22, 2014	3	5:00	Las Vegas, Nevada, United States	
Win	9–2	Torrance Taylor	Decision (split)	CFA 12 - Sampo vs. Thao	October 12, 2013	5	4:00	Coral Gables, Florida, United States	
Win	8–2	Trent McCown	Decision (unanimous)	CFA 11 - Kyle vs. Wiuff	May 24, 2013	3	5:00	Coral Gables, Florida, United States	
Win	7–2	Ryan DeRocher	TKO (head kick and punches)	CFA 9 - Night of Champions	January 19, 2013	2	0:37	Coral Gables, Florida, United States	
Win	6–2	Anthony Christodoulou	Decision (unanimous)	CFA 8 - Araujo vs. Bradley	October 6, 2012	3	5:00	Coral Gables, Florida, United States	
Win	5–2	Jayson Jones	TKO (retirement)	CFA 3 - Howard vs. Olson	October 19, 2011	1	5:00	Miami, Florida, United States	
Win	4–2	Chino Duran	KO (punches)	MFA - New Generation 3	September 18, 2010	1	2:27	Miami, Florida, United States	
Loss	3–2	Jonathan Brookins	Decision (unanimous)	G-Force Fights - Bad Blood 3	February 4, 2010	3	5:00	Miami, Florida, United States	
Win	3–1	Johnny Iwasaki	TKO (punches)	NDC 1 - Peru vs. American Top Team	October 17, 2009	1	4:09	Lima, Peru	
Loss	2–1	Derek Campos	Submission	Art of War - Mano A Mano	July 12, 2009	3	1:59	Mesquite, Texas, United States	
Win	2–0	Rod Nieves	TKO (punches)	XFN - Da Matta vs. Thorne	May 14, 2009	1	4:26	Fort Lauderdale, Florida, United States	
Win	1–0	Giovanni Moljo	TKO (punches)	RFC - Revolution Fight Club 3	February 20, 2009	1	0:42	Miami, Florida, United States	

== Bare knuckle boxing record ==
Professional record breakdown
4 matches	2 wins	2 losses
By knockout	0	2
By decision	2	0

Res.	Record	Opponent	Method	Event	Date	Round	Time	Location	Notes
Loss	2–2	Josh Zuckerman	TKO	BKFC 62	June 21, 2024	4	0:31	Hollywood, Florida, United States	
Loss	2–1	Gorjan Slaveski	TKO (punches)	BKFC 35	January 27, 2023	4	1:53	Myrtle Beach, South Carolina, United States	BKFC Welterweight Championship title eliminator.
Win	2–0	Mario Vargas	Decision (unanimous)	BKFC KnuckleMania 2	February 19, 2022	5	2:00	Hollywood, Florida, United States	
Win	1–0	Alan Arzeno	Decision (split)	BKFC 18	June 26, 2021	5	2:00	Miami, Florida, United States	

== See also ==
- List of current UFC fighters
- List of male mixed martial artists
