= Milton Vieira =

Brazilian martial artist

- Born: October 10, 1978 (age 48); Teresópolis, Brazil
- Other names: Miltinho
- Height: 6 ft 0 in (1.83 m)
- Weight: 146 lb (66 kg; 10.4 st)
- Division: Middleweight; Welterweight; Lightweight; Featherweight
- Reach: 78 in (198 cm)
- Stance: Orthodox
- Fighting out of: Amazonas, Brazil
- Team: Brazilian Top Team
- Trainer: Carlson Gracie; Murilo Bustamante
- Rank: 2nd Dan Black Belt in Brazilian jiu-jitsu Black Belt in Luta Livre
- Years active: 2001–present

Mixed martial arts record
- Total: 23
- Wins: 13
- By submission: 9
- By decision: 4
- Losses: 8
- By decision: 8
- Draws: 2

Other information
- Mixed martial arts record from Sherdog

Milton Vieira (born October 10, 1978) is a Brazilian mixed martial artist currently competing as a Featherweight. Vieira is widely credited as the inventor of the anaconda choke. Vieira is a Brazilian jiu-jitsu black belt under Murilo Bustamante and competed in several top grappling competitions including Grapplers Quest. Milton appeared at the 2007 ADCC World Championship and also the 2009 ADCC World Championship. In mixed martial arts, he has competed for the UFC, PRIDE, Strikeforce, DEEP, M-1 Global and Shooto. He is stated to be the inventor of the anaconda choke from his days in Luta Livre.

== Mixed martial arts career ==
=== Early career ===
Vieira made his professional mixed martial arts debut in June 2001 in his native Brazil. Over his decade-long career, he has competed in PRIDE Fighting Championship, DEEP, M-1 Global and Shooto promotions. During this time period he amassed a record of 13 wins, 7 losses and 1 draw, with all of his losses coming via decision.

=== Strikeforce ===
In mid-2011, Vieira signed a one fight deal with Strikeforce. He debuted against Sterling Ford at Strikeforce Challengers: Gurgel vs. Duarte on August 12, 2011 and won via technical submission (D'arce choke) in the first round.

=== Ultimate Fighting Championship ===
In early 2012, it was announced that Vieira had signed a four-fight deal with the UFC.

Vieira faced Felipe Arantes on June 23, 2012 at UFC 147. The two fought to a split draw.

For his second fight for the promotion, Vieira faced Godofredo Pepey on January 19, 2013 at UFC on FX: Belfort vs. Bisping. He lost the fight via split decision and was subsequently released from the promotion.

== Mixed martial arts record ==
Professional record breakdown
| 23 matches | 13 wins | 8 losses |
| By submission | 9 | 0 |
| By decision | 4 | 8 |
| Draws | 2 | |

| Res. | Record | Opponent | Method | Event | Date | Round | Time | Location | Notes |
|---|---|---|---|---|---|---|---|---|---|
| Loss | 13–8–2 | Godofredo Pepey | Decision (split) | UFC on FX: Belfort vs. Bisping | January 19, 2013 | 3 | 5:00 | São Paulo, Brazil | |
| Draw | 13–7–2 | Felipe Arantes | Draw (split) | UFC 147 | June 23, 2012 | 3 | 5:00 | Belo Horizonte, Brazil | Return to Featherweight. |
| Win | 13–7–1 | Sterling Ford | Technical Submission (D'arce choke) | Strikeforce Challengers: Gurgel vs. Duarte | August 12, 2011 | 1 | 4:49 | Las Vegas, Nevada, United States | |
| Win | 12–7–1 | Bruno Lobato | Submission (anaconda choke) | Bitetti Combat MMA 9 | June 18, 2011 | 1 | 1:23 | Rio de Janeiro, Brazil | |
| Win | 11–7–1 | David Cubas | Submission (armbar) | Bitetti Combat MMA 7 | May 28, 2010 | 2 | 4:12 | Rio de Janeiro, Brazil | |
| Loss | 10–7–1 | Diego Braga | Decision (unanimous) | Platinum Fight Brazil 2 | December 5, 2009 | 3 | 5:00 | Rio de Janeiro, Brazil | |
| Win | 10–6–1 | Luciano Azevedo | Decision (split) | Bitetti Combat MMA 4 | September 12, 2009 | 3 | 5:00 | Rio de Janeiro, Brazil | |
| Win | 9–6–1 | Gustavo Rosa | Submission (anaconda choke) | The Warriors | March 28, 2009 | 1 | 1:00 | Barra da Tijuca, Brazil | |
| Loss | 8–6–1 | Luiz Azeredo | Decision (unanimous) | The One: VIP Fighting | February 13, 2008 | 3 | 5:00 | São Paulo, Brazil | |
| Win | 8–5–1 | Jorge Britto | Decision (unanimous) | Capital Fight | December 14, 2007 | 3 | 5:00 | Brasília, Brazil | |
| Win | 7–5–1 | Yukinari Tamura | Submission (rear-naked choke) | Real Rhythm: 5th Stage | November 18, 2006 | 2 | 2:34 | Osaka, Japan | |
| Loss | 6–5–1 | Jean Silva | Decision (split) | Super Challenge 1 | October 7, 2006 | 2 | 5:00 | São Paulo, Brazil | |
| Win | 6–4–1 | Johnny Eduardo | Submission (D'arce choke) | Super Challenge 1 | October 7, 2006 | 2 | 0:59 | São Paulo, Brazil | |
| Draw | 5–4–1 | Kazunori Yokota | Draw | Deep: 24 Impact | April 11, 2006 | 2 | 5:00 | Tokyo, Japan | |
| Loss | 5–4 | Nobuhiro Obiya | Decision (unanimous) | Deep: 22 Impact | December 2, 2005 | 2 | 5:00 | Tokyo, Japan | Welterweight bout. |
| Win | 5–3 | Hiroki Nagaoka | Decision (unanimous) | Deep: 21st Impact | October 28, 2005 | 2 | 3:00 | Tokyo, Japan | |
| Loss | 4–3 | Hayato Sakurai | Decision (split) | Pride: Bushido 7 | May 22, 2005 | 2 | 5:00 | Tokyo, Japan | |
| Win | 4–2 | Diego Braga | Submission (arm-triangle choke) | AFC: Brazil 1 | August 18, 2004 | 2 | 4:25 | Rio de Janeiro, Brazil | |
| Win | 3–2 | Jadyson Costa | Submission (arm-triangle choke) | Meca World Vale Tudo 11 | June 5, 2004 | 3 | 1:08 | Teresópolis, Brazil | Lightweight debut. |
| Loss | 2–2 | Jake Shields | Decision (unanimous) | Shooto | May 21, 2003 | 3 | 5:00 | Hammond, Indiana, United States | Welterweight bout. |
| Win | 2–1 | Magomed Dzhabrailov | Decision (unanimous) | M-1 MFC – Russia vs. the World 5 | April 6, 2003 | 1 | 10:00 | Saint Petersburg, Russia | Featherweight debut. |
| Win | 1–1 | Islam Karimov | Submission (rear-naked choke) | M-1 MFC – Russia vs. the World 3 | April 26, 2002 | 1 | 8:08 | Saint Petersburg, Russia | Middleweight debut. |
| Loss | 0–1 | Cyrillo Padilha Nelto | Decision | Heroes 2 | June 30, 2001 | 1 | 12:00 | Rio de Janeiro, Brazil | |
