= Russell Doane =

American mixed martial arts (MMA) fighter

- Born: August 13, 1986 (age 40); Honolulu, Hawaii
- Nationality: American
- Height: 5 ft 7 in (1.70 m)
- Weight: 135 lb (61 kg; 9.6 st)
- Division: Bantamweight
- Reach: 70.0 in (178 cm)
- Fighting out of: Honolulu, Hawaii, United States
- Team: Hawaii Elite MMA
- Rank: Purple Belt in Brazilian Jiu-Jitsu
- Years active: 2008–present

Mixed martial arts record
- Total: 25
- Wins: 17
- By knockout: 7
- By submission: 6
- By decision: 4
- Losses: 8
- By submission: 5
- By decision: 3

Other information
- Mixed martial arts record from Sherdog

Russell Allan Doane is an American professional mixed martial artist currently competing in the Bantamweight division of the Ultimate Fighting Championship. He is the former Tachi Palace Fights Bantamweight Champion and King of the Cage Flyweight (135 lb) Champion.

== Mixed martial arts career ==
=== Amateur career ===
Doane made his MMA debut as an amateur in April 2007, when he faced Chris Williams at Hawaii Fighting Championship: Stand Your Ground 3. He lost the via guillotine choke submission.

=== Early career ===
Doane made his professional MMA debut on March 15, 2008, when he faced Tyson Nam at Icon Sport: Baroni vs. Hose. He won his debut via TKO. Doane faced Frank Baca at KOTC: Ali'is on July 14, 2012, for the KOTC Flyweight Championship. He won the fight via unanimous decision.

He faced former UFC fighter Jared Papazian at Tachi Palace Fights 17 on November 14, 2013, for the TPF Bantamweight Championship. He won the fight via TKO (elbows) in the fourth round to win the championship.

=== Ultimate Fighting Championship ===
Following his championship win over Papazian in November 2013, Doane would make his UFC debut on January 4, 2014, against Leandro Issa at UFC Fight Night 34. He won the fight via technical submission.

Doane next faced Marcus Brimage on July 5, 2014, at UFC 175. He won the fight via split decision.

Doane faced Iuri Alcântara on September 13, 2014, at UFC Fight Night 51. He lost the fight via unanimous decision.

Doane faced Jerrod Sanders on July 12, 2015, at The Ultimate Fighter 21 Finale. He lost the fight via unanimous decision.

Doane was briefly linked to a bout with Michinori Tanaka on January 2, 2016, at UFC 195. However, Doane was forced from the bout with injury and replaced by Joe Soto.

Doane next faced Pedro Munhoz on July 7, 2016, at UFC Fight Night 90. He lost the fight via submission in the first round.

Doane was tabbed as a short notice replacement to face Mirsad Bektić in a featherweight bout on October 8, 2016, at UFC 204, filling in for Arnold Allen. He lost the fight via submission in the first round.

Doane faced Kwan Ho Kwak on June 17, 2017, at UFC Fight Night 111. He won the fight via TKO in the first round.

Doane faced Rani Yahya on February 24, 2018, at UFC on Fox 28. He lost the fight via submission in the third round.

It was reported that Doane was released from UFC on October 2, 2018.

=== Post-UFC career ===
As the first fight after his UFC release, Doane faced Diego Silva at Destiny MMA on March 2, 2019. He won the fight via unanimous decision.

== Personal life ==
Before making his UFC debut, Doane was a full-time carpenter.

== Championships and accomplishments ==
=== Mixed martial arts ===
- Ultimate Fighting Championship
  - Submission of the Night (One time) vs. Leandro Issa
- 808 Battleground
  - 808 Battleground Bantamweight Championship (One time)
- Destiny MMA
  - DMMA Bantamweight Championship (One time)
- King of the Cage
  - KOTC Flyweight (135 lb) Championship (One time)
- Tachi Palace Fights
  - TPF Bantamweight Championship (One time)
- X-1 Fights
  - X-1 Bantamweight Championship (One time)

== Mixed martial arts record ==
Professional record breakdown
25 matches	17 wins	8 losses
By knockout	7	0
By submission	6	5
By decision	4	3

Res.	Record	Opponent	Method	Event	Date	Round	Time	Location	Notes
Win	17–8	Alex Valentino Arteaga	Submission (arm-triangle choke)	Star Elite Cage Fighting: The Comeback	November 5, 2023	1	3:38	Honolulu, Hawaii, United States	Return to Featherweight.
Win	16–8	Diego Silva	Decision (unanimous)	Destiny MMA: Throwdown	March 2, 2019	3	5:00	Waipahu, Hawaii, United States	
Loss	15–8	Rani Yahya	Submission (arm-triangle choke)	UFC on Fox: Emmett vs. Stephens	February 24, 2018	3	2:32	Orlando, Florida, United States	
Win	15–7	Kwan Ho Kwak	TKO (punches)	UFC Fight Night: Holm vs. Correia	June 17, 2017	1	4:09	Kallang, Singapore	
Loss	14–7	Mirsad Bektić	Submission (rear-naked choke)	UFC 204	October 8, 2016	1	4:22	Manchester, England	Featherweight bout.
Loss	14–6	Pedro Munhoz	Submission (guillotine choke)	UFC Fight Night: dos Anjos vs. Alvarez	July 7, 2016	1	2:08	Las Vegas, Nevada, United States	
Loss	14–5	Jerrod Sanders	Decision (unanimous)	The Ultimate Fighter: American Top Team vs. Blackzilians Finale	July 12, 2015	3	5:00	Las Vegas, Nevada, United States	
Loss	14–4	Iuri Alcântara	Decision (unanimous)	UFC Fight Night: Bigfoot vs. Arlovski	September 13, 2014	3	5:00	Brasília, Brazil	
Win	14–3	Marcus Brimage	Decision (split)	UFC 175	July 5, 2014	3	5:00	Las Vegas, Nevada, United States	
Win	13–3	Leandro Issa	Technical Submission (triangle choke)	UFC Fight Night: Saffiedine vs. Lim	January 4, 2014	2	4:59	Marina Bay, Singapore	Submission of the Night.
Win	12–3	Jared Papazian	KO (elbows)	Tachi Palace Fights 17	November 14, 2013	4	2:30	Lemoore, California, United States	Won the TPF Bantamweight Championship.
Loss	11–3	Kyle Aguon	Decision (split)	Pacific Xtreme Combat 38	August 9, 2013	3	5:00	Mangilao, Guam	
Win	11–2	Tony Sanchez	TKO (punches)	Destiny MMA: Proving Grounds	June 29, 2013	5	0:59	Honolulu, Hawaii, United States	Defended Destiny MMA Bantamweight Championship
Win	10–2	Omar Avelar	Submission (rear-naked choke)	Destiny MMA: Na Koa 2	January 19, 2013	1	1:59	Honolulu, Hawaii, United States	Won the Destiny MMA Bantamweight Championship.
Loss	9–2	Michinori Tanaka	Submission (rear-naked choke)	Pacific Xtreme Combat 34	November 17, 2012	3	2:09	Quezon City, Philippines	
Win	9–1	Masato Sannai	Decision (unanimous)	Pacific Xtreme Combat 33	September 1, 2012	3	5:00	Pasig, Philippines	
Win	8–1	Frank Baca	Decision (unanimous)	KOTC: Ali'is	July 14, 2012	5	5:00	Honolulu, Hawaii, United States	Won the KOTC Flyweight Championship.
Win	7–1	Rich de los Reyes	KO (punch)	X-1/808 Battleground: Domination	July 22, 2011	1	N/A	Honolulu, Hawaii, United States	Won the 808 Battleground Bantamweight Championship.
Win	6–1	Bryson Hansen	Submission (triangle choke)	X-1: Heroes	September 11, 2010	1	2:59	Honolulu, Hawaii, United States	
Win	5–1	Riley Dutro	TKO (punches and elbows)	X-1: Nations Collide	June 4, 2010	1	4:33	Honolulu, Hawaii, United States	
Win	4–1	Timothy Meeks	Submission (triangle choke)	X-1: Champions 2	March 20, 2010	2	1:28	Honolulu, Hawaii, United States	Won the X-1 Fights Bantamweight Championship.
Win	3–1	Jon Delos Reyes	Submission (rear-naked choke)	808 Battleground: Dropping Jaws	February 19, 2010	1	1:48	Waipahu, Hawaii, United States	
Win	2–1	Dwayne Haney	TKO (punches and elbows)	EliteXC: Return of the King	June 14, 2008	1	2:54	Honolulu, Hawaii, United States	
Loss	1–1	Mark Tajon	Submission (armbar)	KCM 7: Kauai Cage Match 7	March 29, 2008	1	2:14	Lihue, Hawaii, United States	
Win	1–0	Tyson Nam	TKO (punches)	ICON Sport: Baroni vs. Hose	March 15, 2008	1	2:33	Honolulu, Hawaii, United States	

== Amateur mixed martial arts record ==
Professional record breakdown
1 match	0 wins	1 loss
By knockout	0	0
By submission	0	1
By decision	0	0

Res.	Record	Opponent	Method	Event	Date	Round	Time	Location	Notes
Loss	0–1	Chris Williams	Submission (guillotine choke)	HFC - Stand Your Ground 3	April 6, 2007	1	0:22	Honolulu, Hawaii, United States	

== See also ==
- List of current UFC fighters
- List of male mixed martial artists
