= Felipe Arantes =

Brazilian mixed martial arts fighter

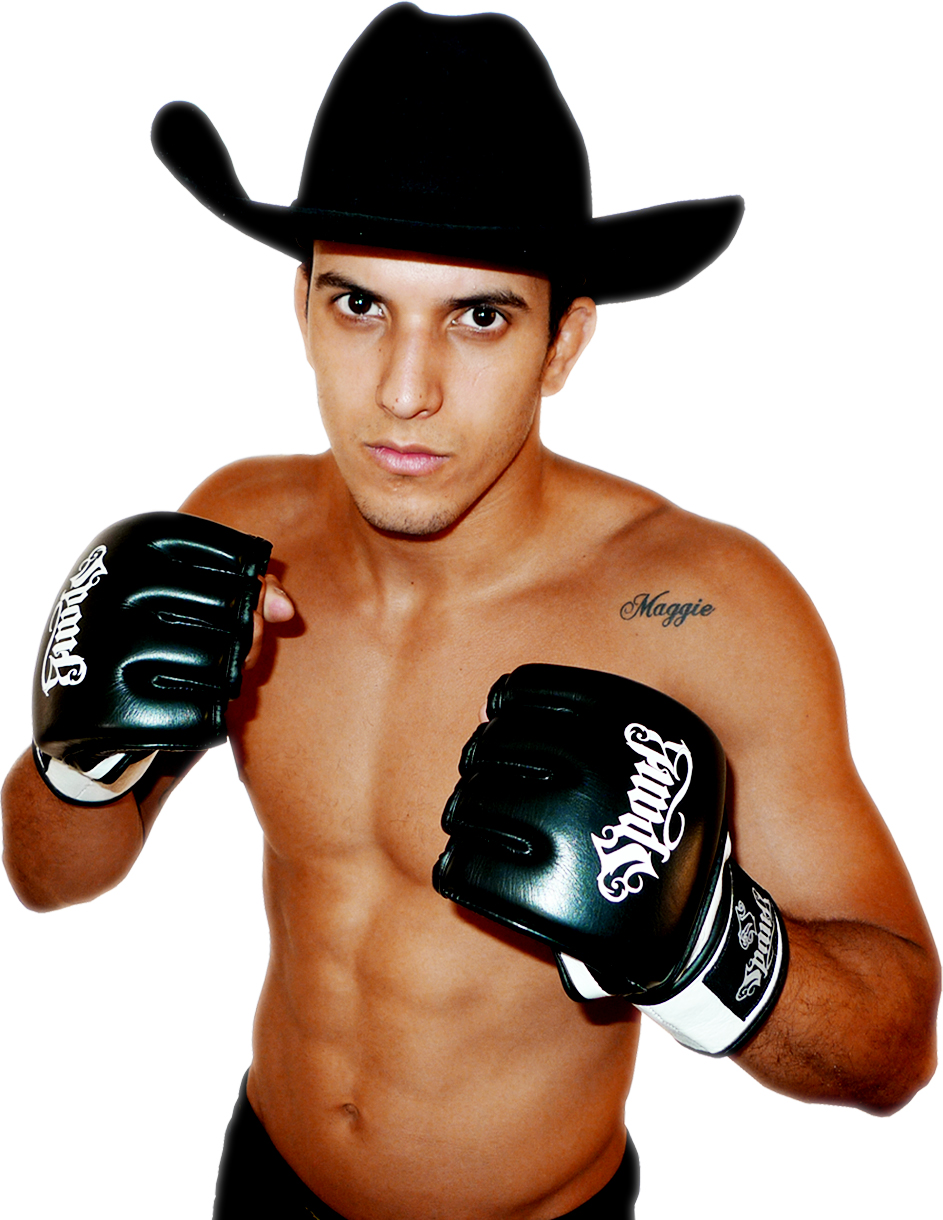
- Born: 9 February 1988 (age 38); São Paulo, Brazil
- Other names: Sertanejo
- Height: 5 ft 8 in (1.73 m)
- Weight: 145 lb (66 kg; 10.4 st)
- Division: Bantamweight (125–135 Ib); Featherweight (135–145 Ib)
- Reach: 73 in (185 cm)
- Fighting out of: Newark, New Jersey
- Team: Macaco Gold Team
- Rank: Black belt in Muay Thai; Brown belt in Brazilian Jiu-Jitsu
- Years active: 2008–2018

Mixed martial arts record
- Total: 31
- Wins: 18
- By knockout: 7
- By submission: 6
- By decision: 5
- Losses: 10
- By knockout: 1
- By submission: 2
- By decision: 7
- Draws: 1
- No contests: 2

Other information
- Mixed martial arts record from Sherdog

Felipe Arantes (born 9 February 1988) is a retired Brazilian mixed martial artist, who competed in the bantamweight and featherweight divisions. A professional MMA competitor from 2008 to 2018, Arantes mostly fought in Brazil before signing with the UFC.

== Mixed martial arts career ==
=== Background and early career ===
Arantes started training in Judo and Tae Kwon Do at 12 years old and Muay Thai when he was 14. He eventually turned to MMA training when he turned 18.

Arantes made his professional MMA debut in May 2008. He competed in events for smaller promotions in his native Brazil (Paranagua Fight, Samurai FC, Full Battle Heroes) and in the United States (Ultimate Warrior Challenge and Urban Conflict Championships) before signing with the UFC. Prior to his UFC debut he had amassed a record of 13 wins, 3 losses and 2 No Contests.

=== Ultimate Fighting Championship ===
Arantes officially signed with the UFC in July 2011. He made his promotional debut on 27 August 2011 at UFC 134 against Iuri Alcântara, replacing an injured Antonio Carvalho. He lost to Alcântara via unanimous decision.

In his second UFC bout, Arantes faced Antonio Carvalho on 14 January 2012 at UFC 142. He won the fight via unanimous decision, earning his first UFC victory.

Arantes faced Milton Vieira on 23 June 2012 at UFC 147. The two fought to a split draw.

Arantes faced Godofredo Pepey on 8 June 2013 at UFC on Fuel TV 10. He won the fight via TKO in the first round.

Arantes was expected to face Sam Sicilia on 4 September 2013 at UFC Fight Night 28. However, Sicilia pulled out of the bout and was replaced by Kevin Souza. He lost the fight via split decision.

Arantes faced Maximo Blanco on 15 February 2014 at UFC Fight Night 36. He won the fight via unanimous decision.

Arantes faced Andre Fili on 25 October 2014 at UFC 179. He lost the fight by unanimous decision.

Making his bantamweight debut, Arantes faced Yves Jabouin on 23 August 2015 at UFC Fight Night 74. He won the fight via submission in the first round and also earned a Performance of the Night bonus.

Arantes next faced Jerrod Sanders on 7 July 2016 at UFC Fight Night 90. He won the fight via submission in the second round.

Arantes faced Erik Pérez on 5 November 2016 at The Ultimate Fighter Latin America 3 Finale. Pérez was awarded a split decision victory.

Arantes was briefly linked to a rematch with Iuri Alcântara on 3 June 2017 at UFC 212. However, on 11 May, Arantes was pulled from the fight for undisclosed reasons and was replaced by promotional newcomer Brian Kelleher.

Arantes was scheduled to face Luke Sanders on 16 September 2017 at UFC Fight Night 116. However, the fight was scrapped after Arantes fell sick on 14 September from an undisclosed illness.

Arantes faced Josh Emmett in a featherweight bout on 21 October 2017 at UFC Fight Night 118. He lost the fight via unanimous decision.

Arantes faced Song Yadong on 23 June 2018 at UFC Fight Night 132. He lost the fight via knockout in the second round.

On 28 June 2018, Arantes announced his retirement from professional fighting after the loss in UFC Fight Night 132 in Singapore.

== Personal life ==
Arantes and his wife Lucilene have two sons.

== Championships & accomplishments ==
- Ultimate Fighting Championship
  - Performance of the Night (One Time) vs. Yves Jabouin

== Mixed martial arts record ==
Professional record breakdown
31 matches	18 wins	10 losses
By knockout	7	1
By submission	6	2
By decision	5	7
Draws	1	
No contests	2	

Res.	Record	Opponent	Method	Event	Date	Round	Time	Location	Notes
Loss	18–10–1 (2)	Song Yadong	TKO (elbow and punches)	UFC Fight Night: Cowboy vs. Edwards	23 June 2018	2	4:59	Kallang, Singapore	
Loss	18–9–1 (2)	Josh Emmett	Decision (unanimous)	UFC Fight Night: Cowboy vs. Till	21 October 2017	3	5:00	Gdańsk, Poland	Featherweight bout.
Loss	18–8–1 (2)	Erik Pérez	Decision (split)	The Ultimate Fighter Latin America 3 Finale: dos Anjos vs. Ferguson	5 November 2016	3	5:00	Mexico City, Mexico	
Win	18–7–1 (2)	Jerrod Sanders	Submission (armbar)	UFC Fight Night: dos Anjos vs. Alvarez	7 July 2016	2	1:39	Las Vegas, Nevada, United States	
Win	17–7–1 (2)	Yves Jabouin	Submission (armbar)	UFC Fight Night: Holloway vs. Oliveira	23 August 2015	1	4:21	Saskatoon, Canada	Bantamweight debut. Performance of the Night.
Loss	16–7–1 (2)	Andre Fili	Decision (unanimous)	UFC 179	25 October 2014	3	5:00	Rio de Janeiro, Brazil	
Win	16–6–1 (2)	Maximo Blanco	Decision (unanimous)	UFC Fight Night: Machida vs. Mousasi	15 February 2014	3	5:00	Jaraguá do Sul, Brazil	
Loss	15–6–1 (2)	Kevin Souza	Decision (split)	UFC Fight Night: Teixeira vs. Bader	4 September 2013	3	5:00	Belo Horizonte, Brazil	
Win	15–5–1 (2)	Godofredo Pepey	TKO (elbows and punches)	UFC on Fuel TV: Nogueira vs. Werdum	8 June 2013	1	3:32	Fortaleza, Brazil	
Draw	14–5–1 (2)	Milton Vieira	Draw (split)	UFC 147	23 June 2012	3	5:00	Belo Horizonte, Brazil	
Win	14–5 (2)	Antonio Carvalho	Decision (unanimous)	UFC 142	14 January 2012	3	5:00	Rio de Janeiro, Brazil	
Loss	13–5 (2)	Iuri Alcântara	Decision (unanimous)	UFC 134	27 August 2011	3	5:00	Rio de Janeiro, Brazil	
NC	13–4 (2)	Andy Main	No Contest (illegal knee)	Urban Conflict Championships 4: Supremacy	11 April 2011	1	4:38	Morristown, New Jersey, United States	TKO win for Arantes overturned due to illegal knee strike.
Win	13–4 (1)	Marcelo Dutra	Submission (rear-naked choke)	Gold Fight 2	27 November 2010	1	4:15	São Paulo, Brazil	
Win	12–4 (1)	Cemir Silva	KO (head kick)	Barueri Combat	30 October 2010	1	0:20	São Paulo, Brazil	
Win	11–4 (1)	Jason McLean	Decision (unanimous)	Urban Conflict Championships 3: Renegades	10 September 2010	3	5:00	Jersey City, New Jersey, United States	
Win	10–4 (1)	Sergio Soares	Decision (unanimous)	Super Challenge Pro	27 June 2010	3	5:00	São Paulo, Brazil	
Win	9–4 (1)	Arlinter Rodrigues	Submission (rear-naked choke)	ABC - Fight Festival 1	29 May 2010	3	N/A	São Paulo, Brazil	
Win	8–4 (1)	Rodrigo Caporal	Decision (unanimous)	Amerad Fighter 1	5 March 2010	3	5:00	São Paulo, Brazil	
Win	7–4 (1)	Francisco Robert	TKO (punches)	Full Heroes Battle 1	7 November 2009	2	2:25	Paranaguá, Brazil	
NC	6–4 (1)	Lester Caslow	No Contest (illegal equipment)	Respect Is Earned 3: Philly Biker Brawl	10 October 2009	3	3:06	Oaks, Pennsylvania, United States	Overturned due to use of illegal equipment (pants) by Arantes.
Loss	6–4	Freddy Assuncao	Decision (unanimous)	Ultimate Warrior Challenge 7: Redemption	3 October 2009	3	5:00	Fairfax, Virginia, United States	
Loss	6–3	Rony Jason	Submission (triangle choke)	Samurai Fight Combat	12 September 2009	1	4:53	Curitiba, Brazil	
Win	6–2	John Lineker	Submission (armbar)	Paranagua Fight 5	7 August 2009	1	1:12	Paranaguá, Brazil	
Win	5–2	Diego Fortunato	TKO (punches)	Paranagua Fight 4	19 April 2009	1	2:03	Paranaguá, Brazil	
Win	4–2	Rafael Miquelini	Submission (rear-naked choke)	Paranagua Fight 4	19 April 2009	1	2:20	Paranaguá, Brazil	
Loss	3–2	Steve Deangelis	Decision (unanimous)	World Cagefighting Alliance: Pure Combat	6 February 2009	3	5:00	Atlantic City, New Jersey, United States	
Win	3–1	Alexandre Pedroso	TKO (corner stoppage)	Paranagua Fight 3	11 November 2008	1	1:37	Paranaguá, Brazil	
Win	2–1	Felipe Alves	KO (punches and soccer kicks)	Paranagua Fight 2	5 September 2008	1	0:26	Paranaguá, Brazil	
Win	1–1	Adriano Tessaro	TKO (punches)	Beach Fight Festival	10 May 2008	1	1:43	São Paulo, Brazil	
Loss	0–1	Felipe Vidal	Submission (armbar)	Real Fight 5	13 April 2008	1	N/A	São Paulo, Brazil	

== See also ==
- List of current UFC fighters
- List of male mixed martial artists
