= Godofredo Pepey =

Brazilian martial artist (1987–2025)

- Born: Godofredo Castro de Oliveira; July 2, 1987; Fortaleza, Ceará, Brazil
- Died: November 9, 2025 (aged 38); Fort Lauderdale, Florida, U.S.
- Other names: Pepey
- Height: 5 ft 11 in (1.80 m)
- Weight: 145 lb (66 kg; 10.4 st)
- Division: Featherweight; Lightweight; Welterweight
- Reach: 73 in (190 cm)
- Fighting out of: Fortaleza, Ceará, Brazil
- Team: Marcio Cupim Team; Evolução Thai
- Rank: 1st degree black belt in Brazilian Jiu-Jitsu
- Years active: 2003, 2006–2025

Mixed martial arts record
- Total: 21
- Wins: 13
- By knockout: 4
- By submission: 8
- By decision: 1
- Losses: 7
- By knockout: 3
- By submission: 1
- By decision: 3
- No contests: 1

Other information
- Mixed martial arts record from Sherdog

Godofredo Castro de Oliveira (July 2, 1987 – November 9, 2025), better known as Godofredo Pepey, was a Brazilian mixed martial artist. A professional MMA competitor since 2003, Pepey competed in the UFC and was the Featherweight runner up on Globo's The Ultimate Fighter: Brazil.

== Mixed martial arts career ==
Pepey got his start in martial arts training alongside his brother, Godofredo Claudio, a black belt in Brazilian jiu-jitsu. Pepey had his first professional MMA fight in 2003, at the age of fifteen, winning the fight via submission (armbar) in the first round. Pepey took a three-year hiatus from fighting after making his debut. He returned to active competition in April 2006 with a win over William Couto via submission. Pepey took an 18-month layoff from fighting before coming back with a win over Jesse Santiago via first round submission.

After going 3-0, Pepey again took a lengthy time off from MMA competition. He took nearly three years off for the second time in his career before coming back to earn his TKO victory over Nino Bala on February 6, 2010. Pepey continued fighting regularly, earning another stoppage win on July 3, 2010, in a rematch against Leandro Rodrigues Pontes after Leandro submitted due to strikes. He fought debuting fighter, Fabio Emanuel Rodrigues, at Combat Fighters Championship 1 on September 18, 2010. Pepey dominated the fight throughout the first round, and won the fight after Rodrigues did not answer for the second round. Pepey earned two more first round submission wins, bringing his record to 8-0, before trying out for the first installment of The Ultimate Fighter: Brazil.

=== The Ultimate Fighter ===
In March 2012, it was revealed that Pepey was selected to be a participant on The Ultimate Fighter: Brazil. Pepey defeated Johnny Goncalves via submission in the first round to move into the Ultimate Fighter house, and become an official cast member.

Pepey was selected as the sixth pick (twelfth overall) by Vitor Belfort, to be a part of Team Vitor. In the first quarter-final fight Pepey was selected to fight Wagner Campos. Pepey won via unanimous decision after two rounds.

After Team Vitor went 7-1, Dana White demanded the teams being scrambled in order to make it a fair contest. Pepey was selected by Belfort to go to Team Wanderlei. Pepey was selected to fight Strikeforce veteran Rodrigo Damm in the first semi-final fight. However, after the doctors removed Damm from the competition, Pepey fought Marcos Vinicius. Pepey won the fight via second round submission, advancing him to the finals of the featherweight tournament.

=== Ultimate Fighting Championship ===
Pepey made his UFC debut at UFC 147 on June 23, 2012, against Rony Jason to determine the featherweight winner of The Ultimate Fighter: Brazil. He lost the fight via unanimous decision.

In his second fight for the promotion, Pepey faced Milton Vieira on January 19, 2013, at UFC on FX 7. He won the fight via split decision.

Pepey faced Felipe Arantes on June 8, 2013, at UFC on Fuel TV 10. He lost the fight via TKO in the first round.

Pepey was expected to face Sam Sicilia on September 4, 2013, at UFC Fight Night 28. However, Sicilia pulled out of the bout citing an injury and was replaced by Felipe Arantes.

The bout with Sicilia eventually took place on November 9, 2013, at UFC Fight Night 32. Pepey lost the fight via TKO in the first round.

Pepey faced promotional newcomer Noad Lahat on March 23, 2014, at UFC Fight Night 38. He won the fight in spectacular fashion by landing a flying knee in the first round for a knockout. The win also earned Pepey his first Performance of the Night bonus award.

Pepey faced Dashon Johnson at UFC Fight Night 51 on September 13, 2014. He won the fight via submission in the first round. This win also earned him his second consecutive Performance of the Night bonus award.

Pepey faced Andre Fili on March 21, 2015, at UFC Fight Night 62. He won the fight via submission in the first round with a triangle choke. This win earned him his third straight Performance of the Night bonus award.

Pepey next faced Darren Elkins on July 23, 2016, at UFC on Fox 20. He lost the fight via unanimous decision.

Pepey faced Mike De La Torre on September 24, 2016, at UFC Fight Night 95. He won the fight via submission in the first round.

Pepey faced Shane Burgos on July 22, 2017, at UFC on Fox 25. He lost the fight via unanimous decision.

Pepey faced Mirsad Bektić on January 27, 2018, at UFC on Fox 27. He lost the fight via technical knock out.

On April 4, 2018, it was announced Pepey was a free agent after the UFC opted not to renew his contract.

=== Post-UFC career ===
After leaving the UFC, Pepey fought Alex Torres at Brave CF 15 on September 7, 2018. Pepey won the fight via armbar in the first round.

Pepey faced Abdoul Abdouraguimov on February 3, 2022, at Ares FC 3 for the AFC Welterweight Championship. He lost the bout via inverted triangle choke in the first round.

== Personal life ==
Pepey ran for office of City councillor of Fortaleza at the 2024 Brazilian municipal elections for the Republicans.

=== Arrested on kidnapping, domestic violence charges and death ===
In 2025, Pepey was arrested in Deerfield Beach, Florida on kidnapping and domestic violence charges. He died in a prison unit in Fort Lauderdale, Florida, on 9 November 2025, at the age of 38.

== Championships and achievements ==
=== Mixed martial arts ===
- Ultimate Fighting Championship
  - The Ultimate Fighter: Brazil Featherweight Tournament Runner Up
  - Performance of the Night (Three times)
  - UFC.com Awards
    - 2015: Ranked #2 Submission of the Year vs. Andre Fili

== Mixed martial arts record ==
Professional record breakdown
22 matches	14 wins	7 losses
By knockout	4	3
By submission	9	1
By decision	1	3
No contests	1	

Res.	Record	Opponent	Method	Event	Date	Round	Time	Location	Notes
Loss	14–7 (1)	Abdoul Abdouraguimov	Submission (inverted triangle choke)	Ares FC 3	February 3, 2022	1	2:06	Paris, France	Welterweight debut. For the Ares FC Welterweight Championship.
NC	14–6 (1)	Pavel Gordeev	NC (illegal knee)	RCC Intro 3	March 9, 2019	1	N/A	Ekaterinburg, Russia	Accidental illegal knee rendered Pepey unable to continue.
Win	14–6	Alex Torres	Submission (armbar)	Brave CF 15	September 7, 2018	1	3:50	Bucaramanga, Colombia	Return to Lightweight.
Loss	13–6	Mirsad Bektić	TKO (body punch)	UFC on Fox: Jacaré vs. Brunson 2	January 27, 2018	1	2:47	Charlotte, North Carolina, United States	
Loss	13–5	Shane Burgos	Decision (unanimous)	UFC on Fox: Weidman vs. Gastelum	July 22, 2017	3	5:00	Uniondale, New York, United States	
Win	13–4	Mike De La Torre	Submission (rear-naked choke)	UFC Fight Night: Cyborg vs. Länsberg	September 24, 2016	1	3:03	Brasília, Brazil	
Loss	12–4	Darren Elkins	Decision (unanimous)	UFC on Fox: Holm vs. Shevchenko	July 23, 2016	3	5:00	Chicago, Illinois, United States	Pepey was deducted one point in round 2 due to an illegal knee.
Win	12–3	Andre Fili	Submission (flying triangle choke)	UFC Fight Night: Maia vs. LaFlare	March 21, 2015	1	3:14	Rio de Janeiro, Brazil	Performance of the Night.
Win	11–3	Dashon Johnson	Submission (triangle armbar)	UFC Fight Night: Bigfoot vs. Arlovski	September 13, 2014	1	4:29	Brasília, Brazil	Performance of the Night.
Win	10–3	Noad Lahat	KO (flying knee)	UFC Fight Night: Shogun vs. Henderson 2	March 23, 2014	1	2:39	Natal, Brazil	Performance of the Night.
Loss	9–3	Sam Sicilia	TKO (punches)	UFC Fight Night: Belfort vs. Henderson 2	November 9, 2013	1	1:42	Goiânia, Brazil	
Loss	9–2	Felipe Arantes	TKO (elbows and punches)	UFC on Fuel TV: Nogueira vs. Werdum	June 8, 2013	1	3:32	Fortaleza, Brazil	
Win	9–1	Milton Vieira	Decision (split)	UFC on FX: Belfort vs. Bisping	January 19, 2013	3	5:00	São Paulo, Brazil	
Loss	8–1	Rony Jason	Decision (unanimous)	UFC 147	June 23, 2012	3	5:00	Belo Horizonte, Brazil	The Ultimate Fighter: Brazil Featherweight Tournament Final.
Win	8–0	Kelles Albuquerque	Submission (arm-triangle choke)	Ceará Fighters 2	July 8, 2011	1	1:29	Juazeiro do Norte, Brazil	
Win	7–0	Leandro Tavares	Submission (armbar)	Champions Night 15	March 7, 2011	1	2:03	São Benedito, Brazil	
Win	6–0	Fabio Emanuel	TKO (retirement)	Ceará Fighters 1	September 18, 2010	1	5:00	Juazeiro do Norte, Brazil	
Win	5–0	Leandro Pontes	TKO (body punches)	Sertao Fights 1	July 3, 2010	1	3:44	Tauá, Brazil	
Win	4–0	Nino Bala	TKO (punches)	Champions Night 13	February 6, 2010	1	1:06	Fortaleza, Brazil	
Win	3–0	Jesse Santiago	Submission (armbar)	Rino's FC 4	September 27, 2007	1	N/A	Fortaleza, Brazil	
Win	2–0	William Couto	Submission (guillotine choke)	Tridenium Combat 1	April 6, 2006	3	2:03	Fortaleza, Brazil	
Win	1–0	Leandro Pontes	Submission (armbar)	Shock FC 3	December 15, 2003	1	3:11	Fortaleza, Brazil	

=== Mixed martial arts exhibition record ===
Exhibition record breakdown		
3 matches	3 wins	0 losses
By submission	2	0
By decision	1	0

Res.	Record	Opponent	Method	Event	Date	Round	Time	Location	Notes
Win	3–0	Marcos Vinicius	Submission (armbar)	The Ultimate Fighter: Brazil	June 3, 2012 (airdate)	1	0:00	São Paulo, Brazil	The Ultimate Fighter: Brazil semifinal round.
Win	2–0	Wagner Campos	Decision (unanimous)	The Ultimate Fighter: Brazil	April 8, 2012 (airdate)	2	5:00	São Paulo, Brazil	The Ultimate Fighter: Brazil preliminary round.
Win	1–0	Jhonny Gonçalves	Submission (triangle choke)	The Ultimate Fighter: Brazil	March 25, 2012 (airdate)	1	0:00	São Paulo, Brazil	The Ultimate Fighter: Brazil elimination round.

== See also ==
- List of male mixed martial artists
