= Santiago Ponzinibbio =

Argentine mixed martial arts fighter (born 1986)

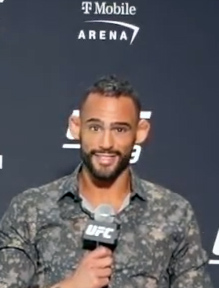
- Ponzinibbio at UFC 269, on 2021
- Born: 26 September 1986 (age 40); La Plata, Buenos Aires, Argentina
- Other names: Argentine Dagger; Gente Boa
- Height: 6 ft 0 in (183 cm)
- Weight: 170 lb (77 kg; 12 st 2 lb)
- Division: Welterweight
- Reach: 73 in (185 cm)
- Fighting out of: Coconut Creek, Florida, U.S.
- Team: Team Nogueira (formerly); American Top Team (2015–present)
- Rank: Black belt in Brazilian Jiu-Jitsu
- Years active: 2008–present

Mixed martial arts record
- Total: 40
- Wins: 30
- By knockout: 17
- By submission: 6
- By decision: 7
- Losses: 10
- By knockout: 6
- By decision: 4

Other information
- Mixed martial arts record from Sherdog

Santiago Ponzinibbio (born 26 September 1986) is an Argentine mixed martial artist currently competing in the Welterweight division of the Ultimate Fighting Championship (UFC). He also works as a UFC color commentator for the UFC Spanish broadcasts on UFC Español.

== Background ==
Ponzinibbio was born in La Plata, Buenos Aires, to parents of Italian descent, with paternal grandparents originating in Sicily. He began training kickboxing when he was 13 years old growing up in Argentina. Ponzinibbio became interested in MMA, but there were too few local gyms in which he could pursue it. As a result, Ponzinibbio traveled to Florianópolis, Brazil, where he lived the first five months in a tent on a beach, doing some odd jobs to try make ends meet. Meanwhile, he trained at several nearby gyms. He turned professional in 2008 competing in regional promotions in South America.

== Mixed martial arts career ==
=== Early career ===
Ponzinibbio racked a record of 18–1 in the Latin America regional circuit before trying out for The Ultimate Fighter: Brazil 2.

=== The Ultimate Fighter: Brazil ===
In March 2013, it was revealed that Ponzinibbio was a cast member of The Ultimate Fighter: Brazil 2. He won his elimination fight to get into the TUF house, defeating Thiago Silva by TKO in round 1. He was the second pick for Team Nogueira. Over the course of the show, Ponzinibbio defeated Marcio Santos by TKO and Cleiton Duarte by unanimous decision to reach the semifinals. In the semifinals, he defeated Leonardo Santos by unanimous decision. However, Ponzinibbio broke his hand during this semifinal fight and was replaced by Santos in the finals against William Macário. The semifinal-round fight with Santos, however, was picked as the Fight of the Season, and his finish of Marcio Santos earned Knockout of the Season which earned Ponzinibbio $50,000 bonuses.

=== Ultimate Fighting Championship ===
Ponzinibbio faced Ryan LaFlare on 9 November 2013, at UFC Fight Night 32. LaFlare won the fight via unanimous decision.

Ponzinibbio was briefly linked to a bout with Jordan Mein on 19 April 2014, at UFC on Fox 11. However, Ponzinibbio was removed from the bout and replaced by Hernani Perpetuo.

Ponzinibbio was expected to face Ildemar Alcântara on 5 July 2014, at UFC 175. However, Ponzinibbio was forced out of the bout with a knee injury. He was replaced by Kenny Robertson.

Ponzinibbio was expected to face Sérgio Moraes on 13 September 2014, at UFC Fight Night 51. However, Moraes pulled out of the bout citing a lingering knee injury and was replaced by Wendell Oliveira. Ponzinibbio defeated Oliveira by TKO in the first round.

Ponzinibbio faced Sean Strickland on 22 February 2015, at UFC Fight Night 61. Ponzinibbio won the back and forth fight via unanimous decision.

Ponzinibbio next faced Lorenz Larkin on 27 June 2015, at UFC Fight Night 70. He lost the fight via TKO in the second round and earned a Fight of the Night bonus.

Ponzinibbio faced Andreas Ståhl on 10 December 2015, at UFC Fight Night 80. He won the bout via TKO in the first round.

Ponzinibbio faced Court McGee on 16 April 2016, at UFC on Fox 19. He won the bout via TKO in the first round.

Ponzinibbio next faced Zak Cummings on 6 August 2016, at UFC Fight Night 92. He won the fight via unanimous decision.

Ponzinibbio faced Nordine Taleb on 19 February 2017, at UFC Fight Night 105. He won the fight by unanimous decision.

Ponzinibbio faced Gunnar Nelson on 16 July 2017, at UFC Fight Night 113. He won the fight by knockout in the first round, becoming the first man to finish Nelson by knockout in MMA competition. The win also earned him his first Performance of the Night bonus award. At the post fight press conference, Nelson claimed that Ponzinibbio poked him in the eye during an earlier exchange and caused him to see double, stating “I really should have said something because I was seeing double for the rest of the fight. He caught me with a shot that I didn’t really see.” Ponzinibbio dismissed Nelson's claim and stated "I went there to knock him out and thank God it went as expected, I won by knockout. If (the eye poke) happened, of course it wasn’t intentional, but I watched the video again and didn’t see it."

Ponzinibbio faced Mike Perry on 16 December 2017, at UFC on Fox 26. He won the fight by unanimous decision.

Ponzinibbio was expected to face Kamaru Usman on 19 May 2018, at UFC Fight Night 129. However, on 21 April 2018, Ponzinibbio announced he was injured and pulled from the card.

Ponzinibbio faced Neil Magny on 17 November 2018, at UFC Fight Night 140. He won the fight via knockout. This win earned him the Performance of the Night award.

Ponzinibbio was expected to face Robbie Lawler on 14 December 2019, at UFC 245. However, on 12 October 2019, it was revealed that Ponzinibbio had pulled out of the fight due to a staph infection.

Ponzinibbio was scheduled to face Muslim Salikhov on 16 January 2021, at UFC on ABC 1. However, Salikhov pulled out of the bout in mid-December citing health issues after contracting COVID-19. However, Li Jingliang stepped in as a replacement on short notice and the two fought at UFC on ABC 1. Ponzinibbio lost the fight via first-round knockout.

Ponzinibbio faced Miguel Baeza on 5 June 2021, at UFC Fight Night 189. He won the back-and-forth fight via unanimous decision. This bout earned him the Fight of the Night award.

Ponzinibbio faced Geoff Neal on 11 December 2021, at UFC 269. He lost the back-and-forth bout via split decision. 10 out of 14 media scores gave it to Neal.

Ponzinibbio faced Michel Pereira on 21 May 2022 at UFC Fight Night 206. He lost the fight via split decision. This fight earned him the Fight of the Night award.

Ponzinibbio was scheduled to face Robbie Lawler on 10 December 2022, at UFC 282. However, the week of the event, Lawler was forced to withdraw due to an undisclosed injury. He was replaced by Alex Morono at a catchweight of 180 pounds. Ponzinibbio won the fight via technical knockout. This win earned him the Performance of the Night award.

Ponzinibbio faced Kevin Holland on 8 April 2023, at UFC 287. He lost the bout via knockout in the third round.

Ponzinibbio was scheduled to face Daniel Rodriguez on 16 September 2023, at UFC Fight Night 227. However, Rodriguez was pulled from the bout by USADA after testing positive for the banned substance ostarine. Ponzinibbio then announced in early September that he would not be competing at the event after all.

Ponzinibbio faced Muslim Salikhov on 13 July 2024 at UFC on ESPN 59. He lost the fight by split decision. 9 out of 13 media outlets scored the bout for Ponzinibbio.

Ponzinibbio faced Carlston Harris on 11 January 2025 at UFC Fight Night 249. He won the fight by technical knockout in the third round.

Ponzinibbio faced Daniel Rodriguez on 3 May 2025 at UFC on ESPN 67. He lost the fight by technical knockout in the third round.

Ponzinibbio was scheduled to face Vicente Luque on 11 October 2025, at UFC Fight Night 261. However, Ponzinibbio was forced to pull out from the event due to injury, and was replaced by Joel Álvarez.

Ponzinibbio faced Sam Patterson on 25 July 2026 at UFC Fight Night 282. He lost the fight by technical knockout in the second round.

== Championships and accomplishments ==
- Ultimate Fighting Championship
  - Fight of the Night (Three Times) vs. Lorenz Larkin, Miguel Baeza, and Michel Pereira
  - Performance of the Night (Three times) vs. Gunnar Nelson, Neil Magny, and Alex Morono
  - UFC.com Awards
    - 2021: Ranked #8 Fight of the Year vs. Miguel Baeza
- MMAjunkie.com
  - 2021 June Fight of the Month vs. Miguel Baeza
  - 2022 May Fight of the Month vs. Michel Pereira

== Mixed martial arts record ==
Professional record breakdown
40 matches	30 wins	10 losses
By knockout	17	6
By submission	6	0
By decision	7	4

Res.	Record	Opponent	Method	Event	Date	Round	Time	Location	Notes
Loss	30–10	Sam Patterson	TKO (punches)	UFC Fight Night: Ankalaev vs. Guskov	25 July 2026	2	3:06	Abu Dhabi, United Arab Emirates	
Loss	30–9	Daniel Rodriguez	TKO (punches)	UFC on ESPN: Sandhagen vs. Figueiredo	3 May 2025	3	1:12	Des Moines, Iowa, United States	
Win	30–8	Carlston Harris	TKO (punches)	UFC Fight Night: Dern vs. Ribas 2	11 January 2025	3	3:13	Las Vegas, Nevada, United States	
Loss	29–8	Muslim Salikhov	Decision (split)	UFC on ESPN: Namajunas vs. Cortez	13 July 2024	3	5:00	Denver, Colorado, United States	
Loss	29–7	Kevin Holland	KO (punch)	UFC 287	8 April 2023	3	3:16	Miami, Florida, United States	
Win	29–6	Alex Morono	TKO (punches)	UFC 282	10 December 2022	3	2:29	Las Vegas, Nevada, United States	Catchweight (180 lb) bout. Performance of the Night.
Loss	28–6	Michel Pereira	Decision (split)	UFC Fight Night: Holm vs. Vieira	21 May 2022	3	5:00	Las Vegas, Nevada, United States	Fight of the Night.
Loss	28–5	Geoff Neal	Decision (split)	UFC 269	11 December 2021	3	5:00	Las Vegas, Nevada, United States	
Win	28–4	Miguel Baeza	Decision (unanimous)	UFC Fight Night: Rozenstruik vs. Sakai	5 June 2021	3	5:00	Las Vegas, Nevada, United States	Fight of the Night.
Loss	27–4	Li Jingliang	KO (punch)	UFC on ABC: Holloway vs. Kattar	16 January 2021	1	4:25	Abu Dhabi, United Arab Emirates	
Win	27–3	Neil Magny	KO (punch)	UFC Fight Night: Magny vs. Ponzinibbio	17 November 2018	4	2:36	Buenos Aires, Argentina	Performance of the Night.
Win	26–3	Mike Perry	Decision (unanimous)	UFC on Fox: Lawler vs. dos Anjos	16 December 2017	3	5:00	Winnipeg, Manitoba, Canada	
Win	25–3	Gunnar Nelson	KO (punches)	UFC Fight Night: Nelson vs. Ponzinibbio	16 July 2017	1	1:22	Glasgow, Scotland	Performance of the Night.
Win	24–3	Nordine Taleb	Decision (unanimous)	UFC Fight Night: Lewis vs. Browne	19 February 2017	3	5:00	Halifax, Nova Scotia, Canada	
Win	23–3	Zak Cummings	Decision (unanimous)	UFC Fight Night: Rodríguez vs. Caceres	6 August 2016	3	5:00	Salt Lake City, Utah, United States	
Win	22–3	Court McGee	TKO (punches)	UFC on Fox: Teixeira vs. Evans	16 April 2016	1	4:15	Tampa, Florida, United States	
Win	21–3	Andreas Ståhl	TKO (punches)	UFC Fight Night: Namajunas vs. VanZant	10 December 2015	1	4:25	Las Vegas, Nevada, United States	
Loss	20–3	Lorenz Larkin	TKO (punches)	UFC Fight Night: Machida vs. Romero	27 June 2015	2	3:07	Hollywood, Florida, United States	Fight of the Night.
Win	20–2	Sean Strickland	Decision (unanimous)	UFC Fight Night: Bigfoot vs. Mir	22 February 2015	3	5:00	Porto Alegre, Brazil	
Win	19–2	Wendell Oliveira	KO (punches)	UFC Fight Night: Bigfoot vs. Arlovski	13 September 2014	1	1:20	Brasília, Brazil	
Loss	18–2	Ryan LaFlare	Decision (unanimous)	UFC Fight Night: Belfort vs. Henderson 2	9 November 2013	3	5:00	Goiânia, Brazil	
Win	18–1	Cleiton Duarte	Submission (guillotine choke)	São José Super Fight 2	9 June 2012	1	2:38	São José, Brazil	
Win	17–1	Sebastian Vidal	TKO (punches)	Insano Empalux: Grand Prix	2 March 2012	1	2:12	São José, Brazil	Won the Insano Empalux Welterweight Grand Prix.
Win	16–1	Diego Vieria	Submission (armbar)	Insano Empalux: Grand Prix	2 March 2012	1	1:59	São José, Brazil	Insano Empalux Welterweight Grand Prix Semifinal.
Win	15–1	William Dias	TKO (retirement)	Monster Black Combat 1	12 December 2011	2	5:00	Rio Grande, Brazil	
Win	14–1	Sebastian de Oliveira Jr.	TKO (punches)	São José Super Fight 1	1 October 2011	1	2:00	São José, Brazil	
Win	13–1	Lucas Nascimento	TKO (knee injury)	Nitrix Champion Fight 8	17 September 2011	1	1:30	Joinville, Brazil	
Win	12–1	Deivid Santos	KO (head kick)	Nitrix Champion Fight 8	17 September 2011	3	0:15	Joinville, Brazil	
Loss	11–1	Leonardo Mafra	TKO (punches)	Centurion Mixed Martial Arts 2	9 July 2011	1	3:17	Itajai, Brazil	
Win	11–0	Geverson Pereira	Submission (choke)	Brazilian Fight League 9	6 November 2010	1	N/A	Curitiba, Brazil	
Win	10–0	Yuri Fraga	Decision (unanimous)	Amazon Fight 5	10 October 2010	3	5:00	Belém, Brazil	
Win	9–0	Felipe Santos	TKO (punches)	Expo FC 1	21 August 2010	1	4:25	Sorocaba, Brazil	
Win	8–0	Henrique Inseto	TKO (punches)	Hero Kombat 1	24 April 2010	2	4:53	São Sebastião, Brazil	
Win	7–0	Ezequiel Ricci	Decision (unanimous)	Real Fights 7	27 March 2010	3	5:00	Buenos Aires, Argentina	
Win	6–0	Andrez Jimenez	Submission (rear-naked choke)	Argentina FC 2	27 December 2009	1	3:12	Buenos Aires, Argentina	
Win	5–0	Diego Lopez	Submission (guillotine choke)	Explosion Fight Night 2	1 November 2009	1	2:31	Buenos Aires, Argentina	
Win	4–0	Matias Sosa	Submission (kimura)	Real Fights 6	27 September 2009	1	N/A	Buenos Aires, Argentina	
Win	3–0	Emiliano Candau	TKO (punches)	Cupide del MMA 2	7 November 2008	2	3:12	Santa Fe, Argentina	
Win	2–0	Lucas Funes	Submission (rear-naked choke)	Cupide del MMA 1	5 October 2008	1	1:30	Santa Fe, Argentina	
Win	1–0	Gaston Micucci	KO (head kick)	Copa Desafio 1	19 July 2008	3	3:13	Buenos Aires, Argentina	Welterweight debut.

Exhibition record breakdown		
4 matches	4 wins	0 losses
By knockout	2	0
By decision	2	0

Res.	Record	Opponent	Method	Event	Date	Round	Time	Location	Notes
Win	4–0	Leonardo Santos	Decision (unanimous)	The Ultimate Fighter: Brazil 2	N/A(airdate)	3	5:00	São Paulo, Brazil	Semi-finals bout.
Win	3–0	Cleiton Duarte	Decision (unanimous)	The Ultimate Fighter: Brazil 2	N/A (airdate)	2	5:00	São Paulo, Brazil	Quarter-finals bout.
Win	2–0	Márcio Santos	TKO (punches)	The Ultimate Fighter: Brazil 2	N/A (airdate)	3	5:00	São Paulo, Brazil	Preliminary bout.
Win	1–0	Thiago Silva	TKO (punches)	The Ultimate Fighter: Brazil 2	17 March 2013 (airdate)	2	N/A	São Paulo, Brazil	TUF: Brazil 2 house entry bout.

== See also ==
- List of current UFC fighters
- List of male mixed martial artists
