= Matt Dwyer =

Canadian mixed martial artist

- Born: December 17, 1989 (age 36); New Westminster, British Columbia, Canada
- Nationality: Canadian
- Height: 6 ft 4 in (1.93 m)
- Weight: 185 lb (84 kg; 13 st 3 lb)
- Division: Middleweight; Welterweight
- Reach: 76 in (190 cm)
- Stance: Orthodox
- Fighting out of: Kelowna, British Columbia, Canada
- Team: Toshido Mixed Martial Arts
- Rank: Brown belt in no-gi Brazilian Jiu-Jitsu
- Years active: 2011–present

Mixed martial arts record
- Total: 20
- Wins: 11
- By knockout: 9
- By decision: 2
- Losses: 9
- By knockout: 4
- By decision: 5

Other information
- Mixed martial arts record from Sherdog

Matt Dwyer (born December 17, 1989) is a Canadian mixed martial artist currently competing in the Middleweight division. A professional competitor since 2011, he has competed for the UFC.

== Mixed martial arts career ==
Dwyer made his professional debut in 2011 competing in regional promotions in his native British Columbia. He compiled a record of 7–1, finishing all of his opponents, including notable fighters Shonie Carter and DaMarques Johnson by KO/TKO before signing with the UFC in the summer of 2014.

=== Ultimate Fighting Championship ===
Dwyer was expected to make his promotional debut on August 2, 2014, at UFC 176 against Alex Garcia. However, Dwyer pulled out of the bout citing injury and was replaced by Neil Magny. Subsequently, after UFC 176 was cancelled, Magny/Garcia was rescheduled and eventually took place on August 23, 2014, at UFC Fight Night 49.

Dwyer eventually made his debut on October 4, 2014, at UFC Fight Night 54 where he faced Albert Tumenov. Dwyer lost the fight knockout in the first round.

Dwyer faced William Macário on February 22, 2015, at UFC Fight Night 61. Dwyer won the fight via knockout in the first round. Subsequently, Dwyer earned a Performance of the Night bonus.

Dwyer faced Alan Jouban on July 15, 2015, at UFC Fight Night 71. He lost the back and forth fight by unanimous decision. Both participants were awarded Fight of the Night honors.

Dwyer face promotional newcomer Randy Brown on January 30, 2016, at UFC on Fox 18. He lost the fight via unanimous decision and was subsequently released from the promotion.

=== Post-UFC career ===
After being released from the promotion Dwyer would return to the Canadian regional scene winning three straight including victories over UFC veteran's Jesse Ronson and Dominique Steele. During this period however Dwyer would have 3 fights cancelled causing a period of inactivity from mid 2016-late 2017

He would briefly be paired against Joe Riggs for the main event of Fight Night 9: Lethbridge for the vacant Middleweight title on January 21, 2019. However the bout was canceled due to injury for Riggs. He would be replaced by Chris Curtis, Dwyer would go on to lose the fight via majority decision.

Dwyer next faced KB Bhullar at Unified MMA 38 for the Middleweight title on September 27, 2019. He would lose the fight via unanimous decision.

Travelling to Russia for his next bout, he faced Mikhail Ragozin at RCC 7 on December 14, 2019. Dwyer would lose the fight via unanimous decision.

Returning to action amidst the COVID-19 pandemic, he faced UFC veteran and Ultimate Fighter winner Elias Theodorou at Rise FC 6 on March 13, 2021. He would lose the fight via technical knockout in the third round.

Dwyer faced Christophe Van Dijk on December 1, 2022, at BFL 74, losing the bout via knockout due to a knee and punches in the second round.

== Championships and accomplishments ==
- Battlefield Fight League
  - Battlefield Fight League Welterweight Championship (one time; former)
    - One successful title defense
  - Battlefield Fight League Middleweight Championship (one time; former)
- Ultimate Fighting Championship
  - Performance of the Night (One time) vs. William Macário
  - Fight of the Night (One time) vs. Alan Jouban
  - UFC.com Awards
    - 2015: Ranked #10 Knockout of the Year vs. William Macario

== Mixed martial arts record ==
Professional record breakdown
20 matches	11 wins	9 losses
By knockout	9	4
By submission	0	0
By decision	2	5

Res.	Record	Opponent	Method	Event	Date	Round	Time	Location	Notes
Loss	11–9	Christophe Van Dijk	KO (knee and punches)	BFL 75	December 1, 2022	2	4:28	Vancouver, British Columbia, Canada	For the Interim BFL Middleweight Championship.
Loss	11–8	Elias Theodorou	TKO (punches)	Rise FC 6: Fighting the Stigma	March 13, 2021	3	1:20	Victoria, British Columbia, Canada	
Loss	11–7	Mikhail Ragozin	Decision (unanimous)	RCC 7	December 14, 2019	3	5:00	Yekaterinburg, Russia	
Loss	11–6	KB Bhullar	Decision (unanimous)	Unified MMA 38	September 27, 2019	5	5:00	Edmonton, Alberta, Canada	For the Unified MMA Middleweight Championship.
Loss	11–5	Chris Curtis	Decision (majority)	Z Promotions Fight Night 9: Lethbridge	January 25, 2019	5	5:00	Lethbridge, Alberta, Canada	For the vacant ZP Middleweight Championship.
Win	11–4	Dominique Steele	KO (punch)	XXFC 18: Diablo Fight Series	July 21, 2018	1	4:59	British Columbia, Canada	Won the vacant XFFC Middleweight Championship.
Win	10–4	Chris Anderson	Decision (split)	BFL 53	January 13, 2018	5	5:00	British Columbia, Canada	Middleweight debut; won BFL Middleweight Championship.
Win	9–4	Jesse Ronson	Decision (unanimous)	XFFC 10: Out of the Ashes	July 8, 2016	3	5:00	Grande Prairie, Alberta, Canada	
Loss	8–4	Randy Brown	Decision (unanimous)	UFC on Fox: Johnson vs. Bader	January 30, 2016	3	5:00	Newark, New Jersey, United States	
Loss	8–3	Alan Jouban	Decision (unanimous)	UFC Fight Night: Mir vs. Duffee	July 15, 2015	3	5:00	San Diego, California, United States	Fight of the Night.
Win	8–2	William Macário	KO (superman punch)	UFC Fight Night: Bigfoot vs. Mir	February 22, 2015	1	3:14	Porto Alegre, Brazil	Performance of the Night.
Loss	7–2	Albert Tumenov	KO (head kick and punch)	UFC Fight Night: MacDonald vs. Saffiedine	October 4, 2014	1	1:03	Halifax, Nova Scotia, Canada	
Win	7–1	DaMarques Johnson	TKO (punches)	BFL 30	May 23, 2014	2	3:39	Richmond, British Columbia, Canada	Non-title bout; Johnson missed weight (175 lbs).
Win	6–1	Shonie Carter	TKO (retirement)	BFL 27	January 18, 2014	3	5:00	Richmond, British Columbia, Canada	Defended the BFL Welterweight Championship.
Win	5–1	Colin Daynes	TKO (punches)	BFL 24	June 8, 2013	1	4:33	Penticton, British Columbia, Canada	Won the BFL Welterweight Championship.
Win	4–1	Ryan Chiappe	TKO (punches)	BFL 19	November 9, 2012	1	4:37	Penticton, British Columbia, Canada	
Win	3–1	Levi Alford	KO (punch)	BFL 17	July 28, 2012	1	0:29	Penticton, British Columbia, Canada	
Loss	2–1	Marcus Aurelio	KO (slam)	BFL 15	April 27, 2012	1	0:30	Nanaimo, British Columbia, Canada	
Win	2–0	Mark Doble	TKO (punches and elbows)	BFL 13	February 11, 2012	1	3:31	Vernon, British Columbia, Canada	
Win	1–0	Levi Alford	KO (knee)	BFL 10	August 20, 2011	1	0:41	Vernon, British Columbia, Canada	

== See also ==
- List of current UFC fighters
- List of male mixed martial artists
- List of Canadian UFC fighters
