= David Vieira =

David Vieira may refer to:

- David Vieira (fighter) (born 1982), Brazilian jiu-jitsu and mixed martial artist fighter
- David Vieira (politician), member of the Massachusetts House of Representatives
