= The Ultimate Fighter: Brazil 2 =

UFC mixed martial arts TV series and event in 2013

- Season 2
- Starring: Dana White, Antônio Rodrigo Nogueira, and Fabrício Werdum

Release
- Original network: Globo, Fuel TV
- Original release: March 17 – June 2, 2013

Season chronology
- ← Previous; The Ultimate Fighter: Brazil 1 Next → The Ultimate Fighter: Brazil 3

The Ultimate Fighter: Brazil 2 is an installment of the Ultimate Fighting Championship (UFC)-produced reality television series The Ultimate Fighter.

This season consisted of 12 episodes and a live finale in Brazil. The season tournament finale, along with the coaches fight, took place on June 8, 2013. The show started filming in November 2012 and was in Portuguese. The season was again produced by Floresta, a Brazilian production company, and aired in Brazil on Globo. Each episode was offered over the Internet with English subtitles at TUF.tv.

The UFC held open tryouts for the show in October 2011. The casting call was for Welterweight fighters who are at least 21 years old and have a minimum of two wins in three professional fights. More than 300 contestants showed up, hoping to be one of the 28 fighters selected. On October 30, 2012, it was announced that the coaches for the season would be Antônio Rodrigo Nogueira and Fabrício Werdum.

== Cast ==
=== Coaches ===
Team Nogueira

- Antônio Rodrigo Nogueira
- Luiz Dorea (boxing)
- Everaldo Penco (jiu-jitsu)
- Eric Albarracin (wrestling)
- Sheymon Moraes (Muay Thai)
- Vitor Miranda (kickboxing)

Team Werdum

- Fabrício Werdum
- Wanderlei Silva
- Rafael Cordeiro (Muay Thai)
- Rubens Cobrinha (jiu-jitsu)
- Kenny Johnson (wrestling)
- Felipe Werdum (capoeira)

=== Fighters ===
Fighters:

- Team Nogueira
  - Luiz Dutra Jr., Santiago Ponzinibbio, Leonardo Santos, David Vieira, William Macário, Cleiton Duarte, Neilson Gomes (Thiago Gonçalves)*

* Gomes was replaced by Gonçalves on episode 4 due to injury.

- Team Werdum
  - Pedro Iriê, Tiago Alves, Viscardi Andrade, Marcio Santos, Juliano Wandalen, Thiago de Lima Santos, Yan Cabral (Daniel Oliveira)*

* Cabral was replaced by Oliveira on episode 4 due to injury.

Fighters eliminated during the entry round

- Wande Lopes Santana, Roberto Barros Martins Amorim, Gil Freitas, Felipe Olivieri, Robson Ferreira, Weguimar de Lucena Xavier, Ronaldo Oliveira Silva, Bruno Dias, Luciano Contini, Leandro Silva, Henrique Batista, Thiago Silva

=== Special Guests ===
- Junior dos Santos
- Antônio Rogério Nogueira
- Chuck Liddell
- José Aldo
- Demian Maia
- Erick Silva
- Antônio Silva

== Episodes ==
Episode 1

- Coaches Antônio Rodrigo Nogueira and Fabrício Werdum are introduced to the fighters before the preliminary fights.
- Fighters are told this season will feature a wildcard match, allowing for the two best losing fighters, as selected by their coaches, to return.
- The fights to get into the house were divided into two parts, half on this episode and half on the second episode.
- The preliminary fights began:

Pedro Iriê defeated Wande Lopes Santana by TKO (punches) in the first round.
Marcio Santos defeated Daniel Oliveira by submission (rear naked choke) in the first round.
William Macário defeated Roberto Barros Martins Amorim by TKO (cut) in the first round.
Thiago de Lima Santos defeated Gil Freitas by majority decision after two rounds.
Neilson Gomes defeated Felipe Olivieri by unanimous decision after two rounds.
Luiz Dutra Jr. defeated Robson Ferreira by unanimous decision after two rounds.
Tiago Alves defeated Weguimar de Lucena Xavier by submission (kimura) in the second round.

Episode 2

- The preliminary fights continued:

Yan Cabral defeated Ronaldo Oliveira Silva by submission (rear naked choke) in the first round.
Cleiton Duarte defeated Bruno Dias by split decision after two rounds.
Leonardo Santos defeated Luciano Contini by TKO (injury) in the first round.
David Vieira defeated Leandro Silva by unanimous decision after two rounds.
Juliano Wandalen defeated Henrique Batista by submission (rear naked choke) in the third round.
Viscardi Andrade defeated Thiago Goncalves by majority decision after two rounds.
Santiago Ponzinibbio defeated Thiago Silva by TKO (punches) in the second round.

- Following the preliminary fights, the two coaches were allowed to choose their teams and a coin was flipped (green for Nogueira, yellow for Werdum). Werdum won and opted to choose the first fight, so Nogueira got to choose the first fighter. The fighters were chosen in the following order:

Coach	1st Pick	2nd Pick	3rd Pick	4th Pick	5th Pick	6th Pick	7th Pick
Nogueira	Luiz Dutra Jr.	Santiago Ponzinibbio	Neilson Gomes	Leonardo Santos	David Vieira	William Macário	Cleiton Duarte
Werdum	Pedro Iriê	Yan Cabral	Tiago Alves	Viscardi Andrade	Marcio Santos	Juliano Wandalen	Thiago de Lima Santos

- While the green team is out training, Team Werdum destroys the mattresses (including their own) as a prank by skipping on them on the pool and sledding them on the hills. This meant that both teams are forced to sleep on the floor for the rest of the season.

Episode 3

- Angered at the mattress destruction, Team Nogueira decided to attempt revenge on the yellow team by spraying shaving foam into their shoes. However, they mistook the coaches' shoes for the fighters' own. In retaliation, Team Werdum flooded the green team's mats and belongings with foam and flipped over their lockers.

Tiago Alves defeated Cleiton Duarte by unanimous decision after two rounds.
Yan Cabral defeated David Vieira by submission (rear naked choke) in the second round.

Episode 4

- Yan Cabral of Team Werdum is eliminated because of a broken hand and is replaced by Daniel Oliveira, whom Marcio Santos defeated in the elimination round.
- Neilson Gomes of Team Nogueira is also eliminated due to a torn ligament in his knee and is replaced by Thiago Goncalves, whom Andrade defeated in the elimination round. They will have a rematch to see who will be in the quarterfinals.
- Former heavyweight champion Junior "Cigano" dos Santos visited Team Nogueira and gave advice to Goncalves.

Viscardi Andrade defeated Thiago Goncalves by TKO (punches) in the first round.

- After the win, Andrade taunted Nogueira and created tension between the two teams.

Episode 5

- Werdum announces the next bout as Thiago de Lima Santos against Macario
- Thiago Santos states that he and Macario were scheduled to fight twice before but it never happened so this is the fight he wanted.

William Macário defeated Thiago de Lima Santos by unanimous decision after two rounds.

- Having regained control, Nogueira announces the fifth fight as Leonardo Santos vs. Juliano Wandalen.
- Felipe Werdum plays a practical joke by depicting a black magic ritual in Team Nogueira's locker room, resulting in a food fight between the two teams.

Leonardo Santos defeated Juliano Wandalen by unanimous decision after two rounds.

- Team Nogueira declares they are now on a comeback path after having lost the first three fights.

Episode 6

- The show opened with a game of dodgeball between the two teams, with the right to choose the next fight on the line with Team Werdum winning.
- For the next fight, Werdum chose Pedro Iriê to face Luiz Dutra Jr.
- Antonio Rogerio "Minotoro" Nogueira visited his brother's team during training.
- Dutra complained of pain in his ribs and went to the doctors, where he was cleared to fight.

Luiz Dutra Jr. defeated Pedro Iriê by submission (rear naked choke) in the first round.

- Following the fight, Team Werdum's Daniel Oliveira drew the wrath of Wanderlei Silva when he stated that Dutra was a better athlete.

Episode 7

- The final semi-finals elimination round fight is between remaining fighters Marcio Santos and Santiago Ponzinibbio.
- Wanderlei Silva gave a speech apologizing to everyone, especially for Daniel Oliveira.
- Chuck Liddell was a special guest who showed both teams some of his techniques.

Santiago Ponzinibbio defeated Marcio Santos by TKO (punches) in the first round.

- The decision of referee Mario Yamasaki to stop the fight when Santos suffered the knockdown provoked outrage in Team Werdum. Silva accused Yamasaki of halting the fight too early.
- White talks with the coaches over the phone to choose the next fight. Werdum picks Oliveira to face Cleiton Duarte.

Episode 8

- Daniel Oliveira was chosen to face Cleiton Duarte.
- Two eliminated Team Werdum fighters, Thiago Santos and Pedro Iriê, were chosen for the wild card bout for an opportunity to return to the competition.
- Oliveira was unable to make weight for his fight and was promptly expelled from the show, allowing Duarte to advance to the next round.
- Werdum's team opted not to coach either of his fighters in the wildcard bout.
- Thiago Santos defeated Pedro Iriê by unanimous decision after two rounds.

Episode 9

- The two met to plan the matchesfor the quarterfinals of the program.
- Luiz Dutra Jr. had an MRI done for pain in his right hand. The test confirmed a torn ligament and he had to withdraw from the competition.
- Dutra was very upset over this and cried about it, even begging to fight with one hand. Viera was then chosen to be Dutra's replacement in the quarterfinals.
- The quarterfinals were announced:

William Macário vs. Tiago Alves
Leonardo Santos vs. Thiago Santos
David Vieira vs. Viscardi Andrade
Cleiton Duarte vs. Santiago Ponzinibbio

- The athletes of Team Nogueira and Team Werdum engaged in a series of back-and-forth pranks.

William Macario defeated Tiago Alves by TKO (strikes) in the first round.

Episode 10

- This episode featured two fights to advance to the semifinals.

Leonardo Santos defeated Thiago Santos by unanimous decision after two rounds.
Viscardi Andrade defeated David Vieira by unanimous decision after two rounds.

- Juliano Wandalen was angered by Werdum's joke that involved putting explosives in Team Nogueira's locker room.
- Wandalen then called his coach weak and lacking in leadership. Werdum then decides to kick him off the team, even offering him to Nogueira.
- This was the second time for a fighter to be kicked off a team, since Andy Wang of TUF 5.

Episode 11

- This episode featured the final quarterfinals round fight.
- Before the fight, the coaches took part in a go-kart race for the Coaches' Challenge. Werdum won the race, earning $20,000 for his team.

Santiago Ponzinibbio defeated Cleiton Duarte by unanimous decision after two rounds.

- The four semi-finalists feature three Team Nogueira fighters (William Macario, Leonardo Santos, Ponzinibbio) and one Team Werdum fighter (Viscardi Andrade).

Episode 12

- William Macário defeated Viscardi Andrade by TKO (punches) in the third round.
- Santiago Ponzinibbio defeated Leonardo Santos by unanimous decision after two rounds.
- It is revealed at the end of the episode that Ponzinibbio broke his hand during the fight. Santos was chosen to replace him against Macário.

== Tournament Bracket ==
Elimination Round
Pedro Iriê	2
Thiago Santos	UD
Juliano Wandalen	2
Leonardo Santos	UD
Marcio Santos	1
Santiago Ponzinibbio	TKO
Yan Cabral	SUB
David Vieira	2
Tiago Alves	UD
Cleiton Duarte	2
Thiago Santos	2
William Macário	UD
Viscardi Andrade	TKO
Thiago Goncalves	1
Pedro Iriê	-
Luiz Dutra Jr.	SUB

Quarter-finals
Thiago Santos	2
Leonardo Santos	UD
Santiago Ponzinibbio	UD
Cleiton Duarte*	2
Tiago Alves	1
William Macário	TKO
Viscardi Andrade	UD
David Vieira**	2

Semi-finals
Leonardo Santos	3
Santiago Ponzinibbio	UD
William Macario	TKO
Viscardi Andrade	3

Finale
Leonardo Santos***	SUB
William Macário	2

- Daniel Oliveira did not hit the weight and Cleiton Duarte advanced to the quarterfinals.
  - Luiz Dutra Jr. injured his right hand and had to leave the competition to be replaced by David Vieira.
    - Santiago Ponzinibbio injured his right hand and was replaced by Leonardo Santos to make a great final for TUF Brasil 2.

Legend
	Team Nogueira
	Team Werdum
UD	Unanimous Decision
SUB	Submission
TKO	Technical Knockout

== Bonus awards ==
Like previous seasons of The Ultimate Fighter, this season offered bonus awards in three categories. The following fighters were awarded $25,000 bonuses each.

- Fight of the Season: Santiago Ponzinibbio vs. Leonardo Santos
- Knockout of the Season: Santiago Ponzinibbio
- Submission of the Season: Luiz Dutra Jr.

== The Ultimate Fighter: Brazil 2 Finale ==
UFC on Fuel TV: Nogueira vs. Werdum 2
- The poster for UFC on Fuel TV: Nogueira vs. Werdum 2
- Promotion: Ultimate Fighting Championship
- Date: June 8, 2013
- Venue: Ginásio Paulo Sarasate
- City: Fortaleza, Brazil
- Attendance: 6,286

Event chronology
UFC 160: Velasquez vs. Bigfoot 2	UFC on Fuel TV: Nogueira vs. Werdum 2	UFC 161: Evans vs. Henderson

UFC on Fuel TV: Nogueira vs. Werdum (also known as UFC on Fuel TV 10) was a mixed martial arts event held on June 8, 2013, at Ginásio Paulo Sarasate in Fortaleza, Brazil.

=== Background ===
The main event was a heavyweight rematch between The Ultimate Fighter: Brazil season two coaches, and perennial contenders Antônio Rodrigo Nogueira and Fabrício Werdum. It is a rematch of the first fight, in Pride, in which Nogueira won by unanimous decision back in 2006.

Also featured on the card was the welterweight finals of season two of The Ultimate Fighter: Brazil. The finals were originally scheduled to be Santiago Ponzinibbio versus William Macário. However, Ponzinibbio broke his hand during his semi-final fight and was replaced by semi-finalist Leonardo Santos.

A bout between Thiago Silva and Rafael Cavalcante, briefly linked to UFC 162, was moved to this event to bolster the card.

John Hathaway was expected to face Erick Silva at the event. However, Hathaway was pulled from the bout in late April and replaced by Jason High, who was already scheduled on the card against Ildemar Alcantara. Alcantara instead faced promotional newcomer Leandro Silva.

Derek Brunson was scheduled to face Ronny Markes at the event. However, the bout was scrapped on the day of the weigh in as Markes was involved in a minor traffic accident. While Markes was not seriously injured, the incident prevented him from competing.

This card broke the record for the number of submission finishes on a single UFC event. A total number of eight submission finishes occurred on the card, topping the previous total of 6 that was held by three events.

This was the last UFC to be branded with the Fuel TV brand; on August 17, 2013, Fox Cable Networks discontinued the Speed and Fuel TV channels, replacing them with the Fox Sports 1 and 2 channels. The next Fox Cable UFC matches were branded as UFC Fight Night on FS1.

== Results ==
Main card (Fuel TV)
Weight class				Method	Round	Time	Notes
Heavyweight	Fabrício Werdum	def.	Antônio Rodrigo Nogueira	Submission (armbar)	2	2:41
Welterweight	Leonardo Santos	def.	William Macário	Submission (arm-triangle choke)	2	4:43	(Note: The Ultimate Fighter: Brazil 2 Welterweight Finals.)
Light Heavyweight	Thiago Silva	def.	Rafael Cavalcante	KO (punches)	1	4:29
Welterweight	Erick Silva	def.	Jason High	Submission (arm lock)	1	1:11
Middleweight	Daniel Sarafian	def.	Eddie Mendez	Submission (side choke)	1	2:20
Featherweight	Rony Jason	def.	Mike Wilkinson	Technical Submission (triangle choke)	1	1:24
Preliminary card (Facebook)
Bantamweight	Raphael Assunção	def.	Vaughan Lee	Submission (armbar)	2	1:51	(Note: This bout aired on the broadcast following the Silva vs. High bout.)
Featherweight	Felipe Arantes	def.	Godofredo Pepey	TKO (elbows and punches)	1	3:32	(Note: This bout aired on the broadcast following the Sarafian vs. Mendez bout.)
Welterweight	Ildemar Alcântara	def.	Leandro Silva	Decision (unanimous) (30–27, 30–27, 30–27)	3	5:00
Featherweight	Rodrigo Damm	def.	Mizuto Hirota	Decision (split) (28–29, 29–28, 29–28)	3	5:00
Middleweight	Caio Magalhães	def.	Karlos Vemola	Submission (rear-naked choke)	2	2:49	(Note: This bout aired on the broadcast following the Silva vs. Cavalcante bout.)
Middleweight	Antônio Braga Neto	def.	Anthony Smith	Submission (kneebar)	1	1:52	(Note: This bout aired on the broadcast following the Assunção vs. Lee bout.)

== Bonus awards ==
The following fighters received $50,000 bonuses.

- Fight of the Night: Thiago Silva vs. Rafael Cavalcante
- Knockout of the Night: Thiago Silva
- Submission of the Night: Erick Silva

== See also ==
- The Ultimate Fighter
- List of UFC events
- 2013 in UFC
