= UFC Fight Night: Hunt vs. Mir =

UFC mixed martial arts event in 2016

- The poster for UFC Fight Night: Hunt vs. Mir
- Promotion: Ultimate Fighting Championship
- Date: March 20, 2016
- Venue: Brisbane Entertainment Centre
- City: Brisbane, Australia
- Attendance: 9,552
- Total gate: $1,000,000

Event chronology
UFC 196: McGregor vs. Diaz	UFC Fight Night: Hunt vs. Mir	UFC Fight Night: Rothwell vs. dos Santos

UFC Fight Night: Hunt vs. Mir (also known as UFC Fight Night 85) was a mixed martial arts event held on March 20, 2016, at the Brisbane Entertainment Centre in Brisbane, Australia.

== Background ==
The event was the second that the promotion hosted in Brisbane, the first being UFC Fight Night: Hunt vs. Bigfoot in December 2013.

It was headlined by a heavyweight bout between the 2001 K-1 World Grand Prix and former interim title contender Mark Hunt and former two-time UFC Heavyweight Champion Frank Mir.

A women's strawweight bout between Bec Rawlings and Seo Hee Ham was originally booked for UFC Fight Night: Miocic vs. Hunt. However, the bout was cancelled due to Ham being injured. The fight was later rescheduled for this event.

Justin Scoggins was expected to face Ben Nguyen at the event. However, Scoggins pulled out of the fight in the week leading up to the event citing injury. As a result, Nguyen was pulled from the card entirely.

Abel Trujillo was expected to face Ross Pearson at the event. However, Trujillo was removed from the card on March 12 due to alleged visa issues which restricted his entry to Australia. As a result, Pearson faced Chad Laprise. Subsequently, Laprise's initial opponent Alan Patrick remained on the card against promotional newcomer Damien Brown.

On April 8, it was announced by USADA that Frank Mir was informed of a potential anti-doping policy violation stemming from an in-competition sample collected the day of the event. Mir released a statement denying the use of any performance-enhancing drugs (PED) and he didn't know how he could have tested positive for any substance. He revealed that he tested positive for a small amount of Oral Turinabol and denied knowingly taking the substance. Mir also admitted he will likely retire if he is suspended two years, the standard suspension for first time offenders.

A few days later, Viscardi Andrade was also notified of a potential anti-doping violation stemming from an out-of-competition sample collection on March 7. The sample was collected in Brazil. Ultimately, the bout was overturned to a no-contest, and Viscardi was given a two-year suspension.

== Results ==
Main Card (Fox Sports 1)
Weight class				Method	Round	Time	Notes
Heavyweight	Mark Hunt	def.	Frank Mir	KO (punch)	1	3:01
Welterweight	Neil Magny	def.	Héctor Lombard	TKO (punches)	3	0:46
Lightweight	Jake Matthews	def.	Johnny Case	Submission (rear-naked choke)	3	4:45
Middleweight	Dan Kelly	def.	Antônio Carlos Júnior	TKO (punches)	3	1:36
Light Heavyweight	Steve Bossé	def.	James Te Huna	KO (punch)	1	0:52
Women's Strawweight	Bec Rawlings	def.	Seo Hee Ham	Decision (unanimous) (30–27, 30–27, 29–28)	3	5:00
Preliminary Card (Fox Sports 1)
Welterweight	Alan Jouban	def.	Brendan O'Reilly	TKO (elbows and punches)	1	2:15
Featherweight	Dan Hooker	def.	Mark Eddiva	Submission (guillotine choke)	1	1:24
Women's Bantamweight	Leslie Smith	def.	Rin Nakai	Decision (unanimous) (30–27, 29–28, 29–28)	3	5:00
Welterweight	Viscardi Andrade	vs.	Richard Walsh	No Contest (overturned)	3	5:00	(Note: Originally a unanimous decision (29–28, 29–28, 29–28) win for Andrade; overturned after he tested positive for stanozolol.)
Preliminary Card (UFC Fight Pass)
Lightweight	Ross Pearson	def.	Chad Laprise	Decision (split) (28–30, 30–27, 29–28)	3	5:00
Lightweight	Alan Patrick	def.	Damien Brown	Decision (unanimous) (30–27, 30–27, 30–26)	3	5:00

== Bonus awards ==
The following fighters were awarded $50,000 bonuses:

- Fight of the Night: Jake Matthews vs. Johnny Case
- Performance of the Night: Mark Hunt and Neil Magny

== See also ==
- 2016 in UFC
- List of UFC events
- Mixed martial arts in Australia
