= Brendan O'Reilly (fighter) =

Australian mixed martial arts fighter

- Born: 24 June 1987 (age 39); Melbourne, Australia
- Other names: The Badger
- Nationality: Australian
- Height: 5 ft 8 in (1.73 m)
- Weight: 170 lb (77 kg; 12 st)
- Division: Welterweight
- Reach: 69 in (175 cm)
- Style: BadgeJitsu
- Fighting out of: Brisbane, Australia
- Team: Gamebred Submission Fighting
- Rank: Black belt in Brazilian Jiu-Jitsu under Bruno Lemos
- Years active: 2009–present

Mixed martial arts record
- Total: 10
- Wins: 6
- By knockout: 1
- By submission: 2
- By decision: 3
- Losses: 3
- By knockout: 1
- By decision: 2
- No contests: 1

Other information
- Mixed martial arts record from Sherdog

Brendan O'Reilly (born 24 June 1987) is an Australian professional mixed martial artist who currently competes in the Welterweight. A professional competitor since 2009, O'Reilly was also a contestant on The Ultimate Fighter Nations: Canada vs. Australia and competed in Ultimate Fighting Championship.

== Mixed martial arts career ==
=== Early career ===
Born in Melbourne, and raised in Queensland, O'Reilly has a Bachelor of Applied Science degree from the University of Queensland, and also studied strength and conditioning at the RMIT School of Applied Sciences. He began training in martial arts in 2008 and made his professional debut in mixed martial arts in 2009.

Competing primarily for regional promotions in Australia, he compiled a record of 5 – 0 (1) before fighting internationally in Japan’s ‘RINGS FIGHTING NETWORK’, before auditioning for TUF: Nations in 2013.

=== The Ultimate Fighter ===
On 5 December 2013, it was announced that O'Reilly had been selected as one of the welterweight fighters representing Australia for The Ultimate Fighter Nations: Canada vs. Australia. The reality show was led by Patrick Côté and Kyle Noke and premiered in early 2014.

In his first fight, O'Reilly was defeated by fellow cast member Kajan Johnson via submission and subsequently eliminated from the show.

=== Ultimate Fighting Championship ===
O'Reilly faced Zhang Lipeng in a lightweight bout on 23 August 2014 at UFC Fight Night 48. Zhang defeated O'Reilly via unanimous decision.

O'Reilly faced Vik Grujic in a welterweight bout on 10 May 2015 at UFC Fight Night 65. He won the back and forth fight via unanimous decision.

O'Reilly was expected to face William Macario on 15 November 2015 at UFC 193. However, Macario pulled out of the bout in late September citing injury and was replaced by James Moontasri. Subsequently, O'Reilly pulled out of the fight in the week leading up to the event citing injury and was replaced by promotional newcomer Anton Zafir.

O'Reilly faced Alan Jouban on 20 March 2016 at UFC Fight Night 85. O'Reilly lost the fight via TKO in the first round.

O'Reilly next faced Dong Hyun Ma in a lightweight bout on 3 December 2016 at The Ultimate Fighter 24 Finale. He lost the fight via unanimous decision.

On February 17, 2017 it was announced that O'Reilly had been released from the UFC following back to back losses in the promotion.

=== Personal life ===
O’Reilly is married and resides in Texas, USA, where he works as a farrier and owns a custom saddle company, O’Reilly Colt & Saddle Co. He is still actively involved in coaching Brazilian Jiu Jitsu and Mixed Martial Arts.

== Mixed martial arts record ==
Professional record breakdown
10 matches	6 wins	3 losses
By knockout	1	1
By submission	2	0
By decision	3	2
No contests	1	

Res.	Record	Opponent	Method	Event	Date	Round	Time	Location	Notes
Loss	6–3 (1)	Dong Hyun Ma	Decision (unanimous)	The Ultimate Fighter: Tournament of Champions Finale	3 December 2016	3	5:00	Las Vegas, Nevada, United States	Return to Lightweight.
Loss	6–2 (1)	Alan Jouban	TKO (elbows and punches)	UFC Fight Night: Hunt vs. Mir	20 March 2016	1	2:15	Brisbane, Australia	
Win	6–1 (1)	Vik Grujic	Decision (unanimous)	UFC Fight Night: Miocic vs. Hunt	10 May 2015	3	5:00	Adelaide, Australia	Return to Welterweight.
Loss	5–1 (1)	Zhang Lipeng	Decision (unanimous)	UFC Fight Night: Bisping vs. Le	23 August 2014	3	5:00	Macau, SAR, China	
Win	5–0 (1)	Mike Aarts	Submission (rear-naked choke)	Fury MMA 5	15 February 2013	2	0:57	Caloundra, Australia	Won the Fury MMA Lightweight Championship.
Win	4–0 (1)	Sam Gascoigne	Decision (unanimous)	Fury MMA 4	10 August 2012	3	5:00	Caloundra, Australia	
NC	3–0 (1)	Kei Takahashi	NC (accidental head-butt)	Rings – Reincarnation	9 March 2012	1	2:51	Tokyo, Japan	
Win	3–0	Sam Bastin	TKO (punches)	Fury MMA 1	5 November 2010	1	N/A	Caloundra, Australia	
Win	2–0	Juarne Dowling	Decision (unanimous)	Rize 2	26 September 2009	2	1:39	Mansfield, Australia	
Win	1–0	Sean Attig	Submission (rear-naked choke)	FWC 2	18 April 2009	1	1:07	Nerang, Australia	

== See also ==
- List of current UFC fighters
- List of male mixed martial artists
