= Leonardo Santos (fighter) =

Brazilian mixed martial artist (born 1980)

- Born: February 5, 1980 (age 46); Rio de Janeiro, Brazil
- Other names: Lamparão
- Height: 6 ft 0 in (1.83 m)
- Weight: 155 lb (70 kg; 11 st 1 lb)
- Division: Lightweight; Welterweight
- Reach: 75 in (191 cm)
- Fighting out of: Campos dos Goytacazes, Brazil
- Team: Nova União
- Rank: 4th degree black belt in Brazilian Jiu-Jitsu under Wendell Alexander
- Years active: 2002–2022

Mixed martial arts record
- Total: 25
- Wins: 18
- By knockout: 3
- By submission: 9
- By decision: 5
- By disqualification: 1
- Losses: 6
- By knockout: 2
- By submission: 1
- By decision: 3
- Draws: 1

Other information
- Mixed martial arts record from Sherdog

Leonardo Santos (born February 5, 1980) is a Brazilian retired mixed martial artist and 4th degree Brazilian Jiu-Jitsu black belt. Santos is a four-time CBJJO World Cup champion, two-time World IBJJF Jiu-Jitsu Championship and ADCC Submission Fighting World Championship medallist. In 2006 Santos left BJJ for MMA, fighting in the Lightweight division of the Ultimate Fighting Championship. A professional competitor since 2002, he has formerly competed for World Victory Road, BAMMA, and was the winner of The Ultimate Fighter: Brazil 2 welterweight tournament.

== Mixed martial arts career ==
=== Early career, Shooto and Sengoku ===
Santos make his MMA debut against rising undefeated Japanese superstar Takanori Gomi, who at the time was the Shooto World Welterweight (154 lb) Champion. The fight ended with a Majority Decision win for Gomi.

After this bout Santos returned to BJJ full-time, winning the CBJJO World Cup Championship 4 times between 2002 and 2005. In 2006 after a short time helping his brother Wagnney with his academy in Canada, Leonardo started dedicating himself fully to MMA. He compiled an 8–3 record with major promotions like Shooto and World Victory Road.

=== BAMMA ===
He made his BAMMA debut at BAMMA 6, defeating Jason Ball via unanimous decision.

Santos was scheduled to face Rob Sinclair at BAMMA 7, however he pulled out of the fight, refusing to fly over from Paris as he knew he would not make weight and knew he would not be able make the full amount of money from competing anyway.

=== The Ultimate Fighter: Brazil ===
In March 2013, it was revealed that Santos was a cast member of The Ultimate Fighter: Brazil 2. He won his elimination fight to get into the TUF house, defeating Luciano Contini by TKO in round 1. He was chosen to be a member of Team Nogueira. Over the course of the show, Santos defeated Juliano Wandalen and Thiago Santos both by unanimous decision to reach the semifinals. In the semifinals, he lost to Santiago Ponzinibbio by unanimous decision. However, Ponzinibbio broke his hand during this semifinal fight and was replaced by Santos in the finals against William Macário. This semifinal-round fight with Ponzinibbio, however, was picked as the Fight of the Season, and both welterweights picked up a $25,000 bonus.

=== Ultimate Fighting Championship ===
Santos fought Macário in the finals on June 8, 2013, at UFC on Fuel TV 10. After a strong first round by Macário, Santos rallied and won via submission in the second round to become the tournament winner.

For his second fight with the promotion, Santos faced TUF: Smashes lightweight winner Norman Parke at UFC Fight Night 38. The fight ended in a majority draw.

Santos faced returning veteran Efraín Escudero on September 13, 2014, at UFC Fight Night 51. He won the fight by unanimous decision.

Santos was expected to face Matt Wiman on March 21, 2015, at UFC Fight Night 62. However, Wiman was forced out of the bout on February 11 with a back injury and was replaced by Anthony Rocco Martin. He won the fight by submission in the second round.

Santos faced Kevin Lee on December 12, 2015, at UFC 194. Despite being a significant underdog, Santos won the fight via TKO in the first round and earned a Performance of the Night bonus.

Santos was expected to face Evan Dunham on June 4, 2016, at UFC 199. However, Santos pulled out on April 29 due to an undisclosed injury and was replaced by James Vick.

Santos next faced Adriano Martins on October 8, 2016, at UFC 204. He won the fight via split decision.

Santos was expected to face Olivier Aubin-Mercier on June 3, 2017, at UFC 212. However the bout was scrapped on May 18 as both fighters were removed from the card.

Santos was expected to face Nik Lentz on June 1, 2018, at UFC Fight Night 131. However, it was reported on April 28, 2018, that Santos was pulled from the event due to a hand injury.

Santos faced Stevie Ray on June 1, 2019, at UFC Fight Night 153. He won the fight via knockout in the first round. The win also earned Santos his second Performance of the Night bonus award.

Santos was set to face Jared Gordon on November 16, 2019, at UFC on ESPN+ 22. However, he withdrew from the fight and was replaced by Charles Oliveira.

Santos faced Roman Bogatov on July 11, 2020, at UFC 251. He won the fight via unanimous decision.

Santos faced Grant Dawson on March 20, 2021, at UFC on ESPN 21. He lost the fight via knockout in round three.

Santos was scheduled to face Alexander Hernandez on October 2, 2021, at UFC Fight Night 193. However, Santos was forced to withdraw from the event, citing a calf injury.

Santos faced Clay Guida on December 4, 2021, at UFC on ESPN 31. He lost the fight via rear-naked choke in round two.

Santos faced Jared Gordon on August 20, 2022, at UFC 278. He lost the bout via unanimous decision.

After the loss, Santos retired from MMA on September 8, 2022.

== Personal life ==
Santos has a son.

== Championships and accomplishments ==
=== Brazilian Jiu-Jitsu ===
- World Championships IBJJF
  - 4x CBJJO World Cup Champion (2002, 2003, 2004, 2005)
  - Silver World Medalist (2001 Black Belt Division)
  - Bronze World Medalist (2000 Black Belt Division)
  - ADCC Bronze Medalist (2001)
  - ADCC Brazilian Trial Champion (2005)
  - 4th Place in the ADCC Finals (2005)

=== Mixed martial arts ===
- Ultimate Fighting Championship
  - The Ultimate Fighter: Brazil 2 Welterweight Tournament Winner
  - Performance of the Night (Two times) vs. Kevin Lee and Stevie Ray
  - UFC.com Awards
    - 2015: Ranked #4 Upset of the Year vs. Kevin Lee

== Mixed martial arts record ==
Professional record breakdown
25 matches	18 wins	6 losses
By knockout	3	2
By submission	9	1
By decision	5	3
By disqualification	1	0
Draws	1	

Res.	Record	Opponent	Method	Event	Date	Round	Time	Location	Notes
Loss	18–6–1	Jared Gordon	Decision (unanimous)	UFC 278	August 20, 2022	3	5:00	Salt Lake City, Utah, United States	
Loss	18–5–1	Clay Guida	Submission (rear-naked choke)	UFC on ESPN: Font vs. Aldo	December 4, 2021	2	1:21	Las Vegas, Nevada, United States	
Loss	18–4–1	Grant Dawson	KO (punches)	UFC on ESPN: Brunson vs. Holland	March 20, 2021	3	4:59	Las Vegas, Nevada, United States	
Win	18–3–1	Roman Bogatov	Decision (unanimous)	UFC 251	July 12, 2020	3	5:00	Abu Dhabi, United Arab Emirates	Bogatov was deducted two points in round 3 after multiple illegal infractions.
Win	17–3–1	Stevie Ray	KO (punch)	UFC Fight Night: Gustafsson vs. Smith	June 1, 2019	1	2:17	Stockholm, Sweden	Performance of the Night.
Win	16–3–1	Adriano Martins	Decision (split)	UFC 204	October 8, 2016	3	5:00	Manchester, England	
Win	15–3–1	Kevin Lee	TKO (punches)	UFC 194	December 12, 2015	1	3:26	Las Vegas, Nevada, United States	Performance of the Night.
Win	14–3–1	Anthony Rocco Martin	Submission (rear-naked choke)	UFC Fight Night: Maia vs. LaFlare	March 21, 2015	2	2:29	Rio de Janeiro, Brazil	
Win	13–3–1	Efraín Escudero	Decision (unanimous)	UFC Fight Night: Bigfoot vs. Arlovski	September 13, 2014	3	5:00	Brasília, Brazil	
Draw	12–3–1	Norman Parke	Draw (majority)	UFC Fight Night: Shogun vs. Henderson 2	March 23, 2014	3	5:00	Natal, Brazil	Return to Lightweight. Parke was deducted one point for grabbing Santos' shorts.
Win	12–3	William Macário	Submission (arm-triangle choke)	UFC on Fuel TV: Nogueira vs. Werdum	June 8, 2013	2	4:43	Fortaleza, Brazil	Won The Ultimate Fighter: Brazil 2 Welterweight Tournament.
Win	11–3	Mark Holst	Technical Submission (arm-triangle choke)	Cage Warriors Fight Night 7	September 1, 2012	1	1:14	Amman, Jordan	
Win	10–3	Gilmar da Silva	Technical Submission (arm-triangle choke)	Shooto: Brazil 28	March 10, 2012	1	1:47	Rio de Janeiro, Brazil	
Win	9–3	Jason Ball	Decision (unanimous)	BAMMA 6: Watson vs. Rua	May 21, 2011	3	5:00	London, England	
Win	8–3	Sotaro Yamada	DQ (knees to the groin)	World Victory Road Presents: Sengoku Raiden Championships 14	August 22, 2010	1	3:56	Tokyo, Japan	
Win	7–3	Kiuma Kunioku	Submission (rear-naked choke)	World Victory Road Presents: Sengoku Raiden Championships 12	March 7, 2010	1	3:06	Tokyo, Japan	
Loss	6–3	Kazunori Yokota	Decision (split)	World Victory Road Presents: Sengoku 8	May 2, 2009	3	5:00	Tokyo, Japan	
Win	6–2	Danilo Noronha	Submission (arm-triangle choke)	Shooto: Brazil 10	January 17, 2009	1	3:20	Rio de Janeiro, Brazil	
Win	5–2	Corey Edwards	KO (head kick)	Shooto: Brazil 9	November 28, 2008	1	1:21	Fortaleza, Brazil	
Win	4–2	Alan Lopes	Submission (triangle choke)	Shooto: Brazil 8	August 30, 2008	1	2:10	Rio de Janeiro, Brazil	
Win	3–2	Christian Lopez	Submission (arm-triangle choke)	Shooto: Brazil 7	June 28, 2008	1	0:40	Rio de Janeiro, Brazil	
Win	2–2	Rafael Bastos	Decision	MTL: Mo Team League 2	July 29, 2007	3	5:00	São Paulo, Brazil	
Loss	1–2	Jean Silva	KO (punch)	Super Challenge 1	October 7, 2006	1	1:12	Barueri, Brazil	
Win	1–1	Gabriel Moraes	Submission (rear-naked choke)	Guarafight 3	August 12, 2006	1	N/A	Guarapari, Brazil	
Loss	0–1	Takanori Gomi	Decision (majority)	Shooto: Treasure Hunt 7	June 29, 2002	3	5:00	Sakai, Japan	Lightweight debut.

== Mixed martial arts exhibition record ==
Exhibition record breakdown		
4 matches	3 wins	1 loss
By knockout	1	0
By decision	2	1

Res.	Record	Opponent	Method	Event	Date	Round	Time	Location	Notes
Loss	3–1	Santiago Ponzinibbio	Decision (unanimous)	The Ultimate Fighter: Brazil 2	N/A (airdate)	3	5:00	São Paulo, Brazil	Semi-finals bout.
Win	3–0	Thiago Santos	Decision (unanimous)	The Ultimate Fighter: Brazil 2	N/A (airdate)	2	5:00	São Paulo, Brazil	Quarter-finals bout.
Win	2–0	Márcio Santos	Decision (unanimous)	The Ultimate Fighter: Brazil 2	N/A (airdate)	2	5:00	São Paulo, Brazil	Preliminary bout.
Win	1–0	Luciano Contini	TKO (finger injury)	The Ultimate Fighter: Brazil 2	March 17, 2013 (airdate)	1	N/A	São Paulo, Brazil	TUF: Brazil 2 house entry bout.

== See also ==
- List of male mixed martial artists
