= Viscardi Andrade =

Brazilian mixed martial arts fighter

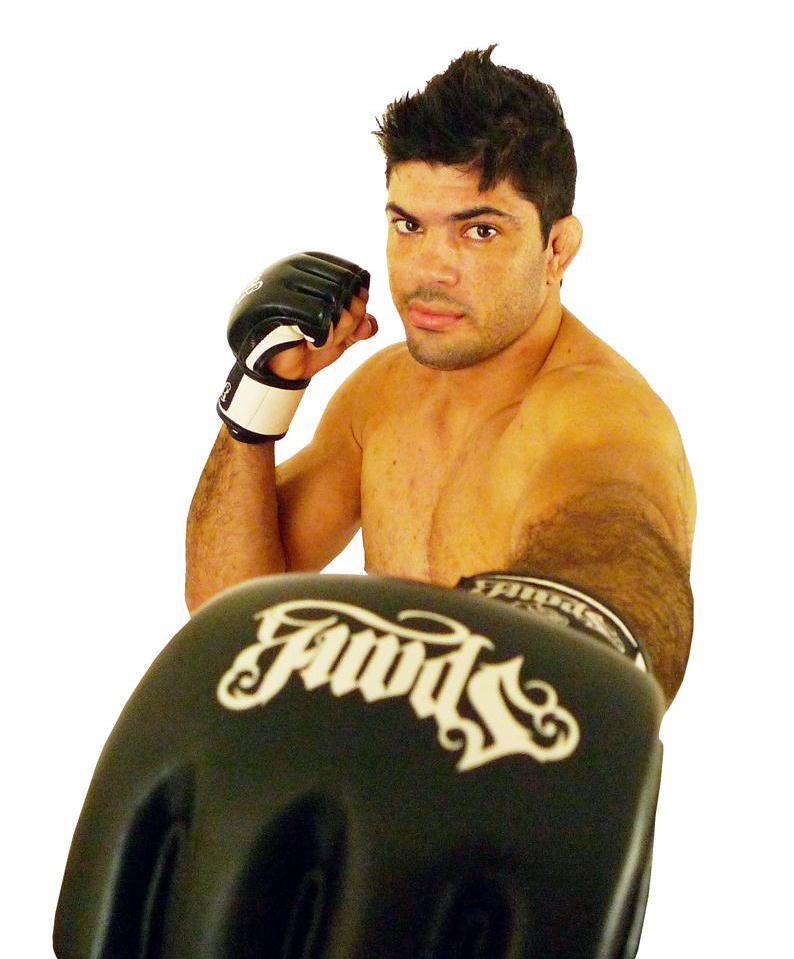
- Born: Viscardi Andrade Guimarães; 8 March 1984 (age 42); Jales, São Paulo, Brazil
- Height: 6 ft 0 in (1.83 m)
- Weight: 170 lb (77 kg; 12 st)
- Division: Middleweight; Welterweight
- Reach: 75 in (191 cm)
- Fighting out of: São Paulo, Brazil
- Team: Ryan Gracie Team
- Rank: Black belt in Brazilian Jiu-Jitsu
- Years active: 2006–present

Mixed martial arts record
- Total: 32
- Wins: 21
- By knockout: 8
- By submission: 6
- By decision: 7
- Losses: 10
- By knockout: 3
- By submission: 1
- By decision: 6
- No contests: 1

Other information
- Mixed martial arts record from Sherdog

Viscardi Andrade Guimarães (born 8 March 1984) is a Brazilian mixed martial artist who competes in the Welterweight division of Taura MMA. A professional competitor since 2006, he was also a contestant on The Ultimate Fighter: Brazil 2 before joining the Ultimate Fighting Championship, and has also formerly competed for Jungle Fight.

== Mixed martial arts career ==
=== The Ultimate Fighter: Brazil ===
Andrade was a competitor on the second Brazilian season of The Ultimate Fighter. Andrade defeated Thiago Goncalves in the preliminary round, before being chosen as Team Werdum's fourth pick. Andrade fought Goncalves for the second time after he had been brought back as an injury replacement for Neilson Gomes, winning by TKO in the first round. Andrade then taunted Team Nogueira, causing friction between the teams.

In the quarter-final round, Andrade defeated David Vieira by unanimous decision to advance to the semis. He faced William Macário, losing by technical knockout in the third round.

=== Ultimate Fighting Championship ===
Andrade made his promotional debut against Bristol Marunde on 3 August 2013 at UFC 163. He won the fight via TKO in the first round.

Andrade faced Nico Musoke on 15 February 2014 at UFC Fight Night 36. Despite dropping and almost finishing Musoke in the first round, Andrade lost the fight via unanimous decision.

Andrade was expected to face promotional newcomer Andreas Ståhl on 26 July 2014 at UFC on Fox 12. However, Andrade was forced from the bout due to injury and was replaced by promotional newcomer Gilbert Burns.

The bout with Andreas Ståhl has been rescheduled and is expected to take place on 27 June 2015 at UFC Fight Night 70. Subsequently, the bout was scrapped during the week leading up to the event as Ståhl was forced out of the bout with an injury.

Andrade faced Gasan Umalatov on 7 November 2015 at UFC Fight Night 77. He won the fight by unanimous decision.

Andrade faced Richard Walsh on 20 March 2016 at UFC Fight Night 85. Andrade won the fight via unanimous decision. On 12 April 2016, USADA notified the UFC that Andrade had failed an out of competition drug test conducted on 7 March 2016. Due a delay in testing the sample at the WADA-accredited lab in Rio de Janeiro, the fight vs. Walsh went forward.

In May 2017, Andrade was released from the company.

=== Post-UFC career ===
After the release Andrade competed in Europe's regional scene, amassing a 1–2 record.

On 27 August 2020, news surfaced that Andrade had signed a three-fight contract with Taura MMA and is expected to make his promotional debut on 23 October 2020.

== Mixed martial arts record ==
Professional record breakdown
32 matches	21 wins	10 losses
By knockout	8	3
By submission	6	1
By decision	7	6
No contests	1	

Res.	Record	Opponent	Method	Event	Date	Round	Time	Location	Notes
Loss	21–10 (1)	Mikhail Ragozin	KO (punches)	RCC: Intro 18	November 20, 2021	1	3:22	Yekaterinburg, Russia	
Loss	21–9 (1)	Vyacheslav Vasilevsky	Decision (unanimous)	Russian Cagefighting Championship 9	May 3, 2021	3	5:00	Ekaterinburg, Russia	Return to Middleweight.
Win	21–8 (1)	Paolo Gomez	TKO (punches)	AFT 26	21 February 2021	1	0:45	Curitiba, Brazil	
Win	20–8 (1)	Caik Monstrão	TKO (punches)	AFT 23	24 October 2020	1	2:12	Curitiba, Brazil	Return to Welterweight.
Loss	19–8 (1)	Alexander Shlemenko	TKO (punches)	Russian Cagefighting Championship 6	4 May 2019	3	3:37	Chelyabinsk, Russia	
Win	19–7 (1)	Sergei Martynov	KO (punches)	Russian Cagefighting Championship intro 3	9 March 2019	2	1:35	Ekaterinburg, Russia	Middleweight debut.
Loss	18–7 (1)	Abdoul Abdouraguimov	Decision	SHC 12 - Strength & Honor Championship 12	5 May 2018	3	5:00	Le Grand-Saconnex, Switzerland	
NC	18–6 (1)	Richard Walsh	No Contest (overturned)	UFC Fight Night: Hunt vs. Mir	20 March 2016	3	5:00	Brisbane, Australia	Originally a unanimous decision win for Andrade; overturned after he tested positive for stanozolol.
Win	18–6	Gasan Umalatov	Decision (unanimous)	UFC Fight Night: Belfort vs. Henderson 3	7 November 2015	3	5:00	São Paulo, Brazil	
Loss	17–6	Nico Musoke	Decision (unanimous)	UFC Fight Night: Machida vs. Mousasi	15 February 2014	3	5:00	Jaraguá do Sul, Brazil	
Win	17–5	Bristol Marunde	TKO (punches)	UFC 163	3 August 2013	1	1:36	Rio de Janeiro, Brazil	
Win	16–5	Michel Vaz	TKO (punches)	Moema Fight	10 October 2012	1	0:31	Moema, Brazil	
Win	15–5	Paulo Silva	TKO (punches)	Brazil Combate	19 April 2012	2	2:30	São Paulo, Brazil	
Win	14–5	Elizeu Zaleski dos Santos	Submission (rear-naked choke)	Max Fight 11	17 March 2012	2	1:27	Campinas, Brazil	
Win	13–5	Dyego Roberto	Submission (rear-naked choke)	Dragon Fight São Paulo: Dragon Fight	25 February 2012	2	3:45	Votuporanga, Brazil	
Win	12–5	Marinho Moreira	Decision (split)	Max Fight 10	10 November 2011	3	5:00	São Paulo, Brazil	
Win	11–5	Arimarcel Santos	Decision (unanimous)	Super Power Combat	8 October 2011	3	5:00	Barueri, Brazil	
Loss	10–5	Edilberto de Oliveira	Decision (unanimous)	Fight Club 1: Brazilian Stars	20 July 2011	2	5:00	Rio de Janeiro, Brazil	
Win	10–4	Flavio Alvaro	KO (punches)	Bitetti Combat 8: 100 Years of Corinthians	4 December 2010	1	0:34	São Paulo, Brazil	
Win	9–4	Adriano Verdelli	Submission (rear-naked choke)	Barueri Combat	30 October 2010	1	3:53	Barueri, Brazil	
Win	8–4	Anderson Crepaldi	Submission (armbar)	Super Challenge Pro	26 September 2010	1	0:48	Itapetininga, Brazil	
Win	7–4	Fernando Paulon	Decision (unanimous)	Watch Out Combat Show 8	19 June 2010	3	5:00	Rio de Janeiro, Brazil	
Win	6–4	Rafael Augusto	Decision (unanimous)	Itu Fight Championship	4 June 2010	3	5:00	Itu, Brazil	
Loss	5–4	Iuri Alcântara	Decision (split)	Jungle Fight 19: Warriors 3	17 April 2010	3	5:00	São Paulo, Brazil	
Win	5–3	Allyson Pinheiro	KO (punches)	First Class Fight 2	28 May 2009	1	4:33	São Paulo, Brazil	
Win	4–3	Everton Santana Pinto	Decision (unanimous)	Kawai Arena 1	13 December 2008	3	5:00	São José dos Campos, Brazil	
Loss	3–3	Leandro Silva	Decision (unanimous)	Beach Fight Festival	10 May 2008	3	5:00	São Vicente, Brazil	
Loss	3–2	Charles Oliveira	TKO (punches)	Predador FC 9: Welterweight Grand Prix	15 March 2008	2	2:47	São Paulo, Brazil	
Win	3–1	Rafael Silva	Decision (unanimous)	Predador FC 9: Welterweight Grand Prix	15 March 2008	3	5:00	São Paulo, Brazil	
Win	2–1	Adriano Freitas	Submission (rear-naked choke)	Mega Fight São Paulo - Mega Fight 3	21 October 2006	1	1:10	São Bernardo do Campo, Brazil	
Win	1–1	Ricardo Silva	Submission (rear-naked choke)	Mega Fight São Paulo: Mega Fight 3	21 October 2006	1	2:00	São Bernardo do Campo, Brazil	
Loss	0–1	Magno Almeida	Submission (americana)	Ichigeki: Brazil 2006	6 May 2006	1	3:55	Bragança Paulista, Brazil	Welterweight debut.

=== Mixed martial arts exhibition record ===
Exhibition record breakdown		
4 matches	3 wins	1 loss
By knockout	1	1
By decision	2	0

Res.	Record	Opponent	Method	Event	Date	Round	Time	Location	Notes
Loss	3–1	William Macário	TKO (punches)	The Ultimate Fighter: Brazil 2	N/A (airdate)	3	N/A	São Paulo, Brazil	Semi-finals bout.
Win	3–0	David Vieira	Decision (unanimous)	The Ultimate Fighter: Brazil 2	N/A (airdate)	2	5:00	São Paulo, Brazil	Quarter-finals bout.
Win	2–0	Thiago Gonçalves	TKO (punches)	The Ultimate Fighter: Brazil 2	N/A (airdate)	1	N/A	São Paulo, Brazil	Preliminary bout. Gonçalves replaced Neilson Gomes.
Win	1–0	Thiago Gonçalves	Decision (majority)	The Ultimate Fighter: Brazil 2	17 March 2013 (airdate)	2	5:00	São Paulo, Brazil	TUF Brazil 2 house entry bout.

== See also ==
- List of current UFC fighters
- List of male mixed martial artists
