= Alan Jouban =

American mixed martial arts fighter

- Born: Alan Michael Jouban; November 25, 1982 (age 43); Lafayette, Louisiana, United States
- Other names: Brahma
- Height: 6 ft 0 in (1.83 m)
- Weight: 171 lb (78 kg; 12 st 3 lb)
- Division: Welterweight
- Reach: 74 in (188 cm)
- Fighting out of: Los Angeles, California, United States
- Team: Black House (2013–present); 10th Planet Jiu-Jitsu
- Trainer: Muay Thai: Julio Trana Jr. Jiu-Jitsu: Eddie Bravo; Wrestling: Kenny Johnson
- Rank: Black belt in 10th Planet Jiu-Jitsu under Eddie Bravo
- Years active: 2010–2021

Mixed martial arts record
- Total: 24
- Wins: 17
- By knockout: 11
- By decision: 6
- Losses: 7
- By knockout: 3
- By submission: 1
- By decision: 3

Other information
- Mixed martial arts record from Sherdog

Alan Michael Jouban (born November 25, 1982) is an American retired professional mixed martial artist who competed in the Welterweight division. A professional competitor from 2010 to 2021, Jouban has also formerly competed for the Ultimate Fighting Championship, Shark Fights, RFA and Tachi Palace Fights.

== Background ==
Born and raised in Lafayette, Louisiana, Jouban competed in soccer from a young age through high school until tearing his ACL. He is of French and Syrian descent. Jouban attended and graduated from Ovey Comeaux High School and then went to University of Louisiana at Lafayette in his hometown for a couple of semesters, but left before finishing a degree.

Jouban later began training in Muay Thai in 2005 at the age of 23, and was undefeated as an amateur, which led him into a career in mixed martial arts.

== Mixed martial arts career ==
=== Early career ===
Jouban had his first amateur fight on March 26, 2010, and won via TKO just 14 seconds into the first round. He had his first professional fight on February 8, 2011, vs. Kyle Griffin, winning via 15 second knockout in the first round.

=== Ultimate Fighting Championship ===
Jouban made his UFC debut on August 16, 2014, against Seth Baczynski at UFC Fight Night 47. Jouban won by knockout in the first round. The back and forth action earned both participants Fight of the Night honors.

Jouban next faced The Ultimate Fighter: Brazil 3 Middleweight winner Warlley Alves on November 8, 2014, at UFC Fight Night 56. Jouban lost the fight by a controversial unanimous decision.

Jouban faced Richard Walsh on February 28, 2015, at UFC 184. Jouban won the fight via knockout in the first round.

Jouban was expected to face Brian Ebersole on June 6, 2015, at UFC Fight Night 68. However, Jouban pulled out of the fight in late March citing injury and was replaced by Omari Akhmedov.

Jouban faced Matt Dwyer on July 15, 2015, at UFC Fight Night 71. Despite having a point taken away for an unintentional knee to his opponent's head, he won the back and forth fight by unanimous decision. Both participants were awarded Fight of the Night honors.

Jouban faced Albert Tumenov on October 3, 2015, at UFC 192. He lost the fight via TKO in the first round.

Jouban faced Brendan O'Reilly on March 20, 2016, at UFC Fight Night 85. Jouban won the fight via TKO in the first round.

Jouban was expected to face Nordine Taleb on July 7, 2016, at UFC Fight Night 90. However, Taleb pulled out of the bout in early June citing an injury and was replaced by promotional newcomer Belal Muhammad. He won the fight via unanimous decision. Both participants were awarded Fight of the Night honors for their performance.

Jouban faced Mike Perry on December 17, 2016, at UFC on Fox 22. He won the fight by unanimous decision.

Jouban faced Gunnar Nelson on March 18, 2017, at UFC Fight Night 107. After being rocked with a punch, Jouban lost the fight via a guillotine choke in the second round.

Jouban was briefly linked to a bout with Brian Camozzi on July 8, 2017, at UFC 213. However, Jouban pulled out of the fight on June 6 citing a foot injury.

Jouban faced Niko Price on August 5, 2017, at UFC Fight Night: Pettis vs. Moreno. He lost the fight via TKO.

Jouban faced Ben Saunders on February 24, 2018, at UFC on Fox 28. He won the back-and-forth fight via knockout in the second round. This win earned him the Fight of the Night bonus.

Jouban was expected to face Danny Roberts on July 22, 2018, at UFC Fight Night 134. However, on July 12, Jouban was pulled out from the fight, citing a neck injury.

Jouban faced Dwight Grant on April 13, 2019, at UFC 236. He lost the fight via split decision. Subsequently, Jouban signed a new, five-fight contract with the UFC.

After an 18 months hiatus, Jouban returned to faced Jared Gooden on November 21, 2020, at UFC 255. He won the fight via unanimous decision.

On May 10, 2021, Jouban announced his retirement from MMA to focus on broadcasting.

== Personal life ==
Prior to signing with the UFC, Jouban was a professional model and also appeared in several television commercials. Jouban signed a deal with Versace in 2016. He appeared in a short film as the face of Versace's Dylan Blue fragrance advertisement along with Gigi Hadid.

Alan and his wife Nicole have a son, Cage (born 2012).

== Championships and achievements ==
=== Mixed martial arts ===
- Ultimate Fighting Championship
  - Fight of the Night (Four times) vs. Seth Baczynski, Matt Dwyer, Belal Muhammad, and Ben Saunders
- Fight Club OC
  - FCOC Welterweight Championship (One time)

== Mixed martial arts record ==
Professional record breakdown
24 matches	17 wins	7 losses
By knockout	11	3
By submission	0	1
By decision	6	3

Res.	Record	Opponent	Method	Event	Date	Round	Time	Location	Notes
Win	17–7	Jared Gooden	Decision (unanimous)	UFC 255	November 21, 2020	3	5:00	Las Vegas, Nevada, United States	
Loss	16–7	Dwight Grant	Decision (split)	UFC 236	April 13, 2019	3	5:00	Atlanta, Georgia, United States	
Win	16–6	Ben Saunders	KO (punch)	UFC on Fox: Emmett vs. Stephens	February 24, 2018	2	2:38	Orlando, Florida, United States	Fight of the Night.
Loss	15–6	Niko Price	TKO (punches)	UFC Fight Night: Pettis vs. Moreno	August 5, 2017	1	1:44	Mexico City, Mexico	
Loss	15–5	Gunnar Nelson	Submission (guillotine choke)	UFC Fight Night: Manuwa vs. Anderson	March 18, 2017	2	0:46	London, England	
Win	15–4	Mike Perry	Decision (unanimous)	UFC on Fox: VanZant vs. Waterson	December 17, 2016	3	5:00	Sacramento, California, United States	
Win	14–4	Belal Muhammad	Decision (unanimous)	UFC Fight Night: dos Anjos vs. Alvarez	July 7, 2016	3	5:00	Las Vegas, Nevada, United States	Fight of the Night.
Win	13–4	Brendan O'Reilly	TKO (elbows and punches)	UFC Fight Night: Hunt vs. Mir	March 20, 2016	1	2:15	Brisbane, Australia	
Loss	12–4	Albert Tumenov	TKO (head kick and punches)	UFC 192	October 3, 2015	1	2:55	Houston, Texas, United States	
Win	12–3	Matt Dwyer	Decision (unanimous)	UFC Fight Night: Mir vs. Duffee	July 15, 2015	3	5:00	San Diego, California, United States	Jouban was deducted one point due to an illegal knee. Fight of the Night.
Win	11–3	Richard Walsh	KO (elbow and punches)	UFC 184	February 28, 2015	1	2:19	Los Angeles, California, United States	
Loss	10–3	Warlley Alves	Decision (unanimous)	UFC Fight Night: Shogun vs. Saint Preux	November 8, 2014	3	5:00	Uberlândia, Brazil	
Win	10–2	Seth Baczynski	KO (punch)	UFC Fight Night: Bader vs. St. Preux	August 16, 2014	1	4:23	Bangor, Maine, United States	Fight of the Night.
Win	9–2	Ricky Legere Jr.	Decision (split)	RFA 15	June 6, 2014	3	5:00	Culver City, California, United States	
Win	8–2	Armando Montoya Jr.	KO (punch)	RFA 14	April 11, 2014	2	3:33	Cheyenne, Wyoming, United States	
Loss	7–2	Mike Rhodes	Decision (unanimous)	RFA 10	October 25, 2013	5	5:00	Des Moines, Iowa, United States	For the RFA Welterweight Championship.
Win	7–1	Chris Spång	TKO (punches)	RFA 9	August 16, 2013	3	1:23	Los Angeles, California, United States	
Win	6–1	Rigo Oropeza	TKO (punches)	Fight Club OC: Rumble on the Range	May 16, 2013	1	1:54	Burbank, California, United States	Won the Fight Club OC Welterweight Championship.
Win	5–1	Cameron Mayer	KO (punch)	USA MMA: Stacked 2	June 16, 2012	1	1:24	Baton Rouge, Louisiana, United States	
Win	4–1	Daniel McWilliams	Submission (punches)	National Fight Alliance: Valley Invasion 2	April 6, 2012	1	0:46	Los Angeles, California, United States	
Win	3–1	D.J. Roberson	Decision (unanimous)	Shark Fights 20	October 15, 2011	3	5:00	Laughlin, Nevada, United States	
Win	2–1	Andrew Goldthwaite	KO (punches)	Shark Fights 17: Horwich vs. Rosholt 2	July 15, 2011	3	2:37	Frisco, Texas, United States	
Loss	1–1	Chidi Njokuani	TKO (body kick)	Tachi Palace Fights 9	May 6, 2011	3	1:27	Lemoore, California, United States	
Win	1–0	Kyle Griffin	KO (knee)	Tachi Palace Fights 8	February 18, 2011	1	0:15	Lemoore, California, United States	

== Amateur fights ==
Res.	Record	Opponent	Method	Event	Date	Round	Time	Location	Notes
Win	2–0	Joden Seiders	Submission (rear-naked choke)	Tuff-N-Uff: Future Stars of MMA	May 28, 2010	1	1:06	Las Vegas, Nevada, United States	
Win	1–0	Dustin Chevalier	TKO (punches)	Tuff-N-Uff: Future Stars of MMA	March 26, 2010	1	0:14	Las Vegas, Nevada, United States	

== See also ==
- List of male mixed martial artists
