= William Macário =

Brazilian mixed martial arts fighter

- Born: William Francisco da Silva Macário; July 1, 1991 (age 35); Rio de Janeiro, Brazil
- Other names: Patolino (Daffy Duck)
- Height: 5 ft 11 in (1.80 m)
- Weight: 170 lb (77 kg; 12 st)
- Division: Welterweight
- Reach: 75 in (190 cm)
- Fighting out of: Rio de Janeiro, Brazil
- Team: Pejor Fight Team; Black House
- Rank: Brown belt in Brazilian jiu-jitsu under Rogério Miranda and Sérgio Bolão
- Years active: 2010–present

Mixed martial arts record
- Total: 18
- Wins: 11
- By knockout: 7
- By submission: 1
- By decision: 3
- Losses: 7
- By knockout: 4
- By submission: 2
- By decision: 1

Other information
- Mixed martial arts record from Sherdog

William Francisco da Silva Macário (born July 1, 1991) is a Brazilian mixed martial artist currently competing as a welterweight. A professional competitor since 2010, he has formerly competed for the UFC and was a contestant on The Ultimate Fighter: Brazil 2.

== Background ==
Macário is from Brazil and was first exposed to mixed martial arts growing up, watching PRIDE fights, and was a fan of Wanderlei Silva and Antônio Rodrigo Nogueira, who were both champions in their respective divisions. Macário began to train in Muay Thai, until he was 14 years old and met his future coach, who invited the young Macário to come to his gym and train.

== Mixed martial arts career ==
=== Early career ===
Macário made his MMA professional debut against Gilmar Souza Milhorance on August 15, 2010. He won the fight via TKO in the first round. Macario compiled an undefeated professional record of 6–0 before being invited to compete on The Ultimate Fighter: Brazil 2.

=== The Ultimate Fighter ===
In March 2013, it was revealed that Macário was a cast member of The Ultimate Fighter: Brazil 2. He won his elimination fight to get into the TUF house, defeating Roberto Corvo by TKO in round 1. He was chosen to be a member of Team Nogueira. Over the course of the show, Santos defeated Thiago Marreta by unanimous decision and Tiago Alves by TKO to reach the semifinals. In the semifinals, he faced Viscardi Andrade winning the fight by TKO in round 3. He was expected to face Santiago Ponzinibbio in the final. However, Ponzinibbio broke his hand during his semifinal fight and was replaced by Leonardo Santos.

=== Ultimate Fighting Championship ===
Macário fought Leonardo Santos in the finals on June 8, 2013, at UFC on Fuel TV 10. After a strong first round, Macário seemed to tire and was submitted in the second round.

Macário faced Bobby Voelker on December 28, 2013, at UFC 168. Macário won the fight via a dominant unanimous decision.

Macário was expected to face Neil Magny at UFC Fight Night 40. However, Macário was removed from the bout for undisclosed reasons and replaced by returning veteran Tim Means.

A rescheduled bout with Magny took place on October 25, 2014, at UFC 179. Macário lost the bout via TKO in the third round.

Macário faced Matt Dwyer on February 22, 2015, at UFC Fight Night 61. Macário lost the fight via knockout in the first round.

Macário was expected to face Brendan O'Reilly on November 15, 2015, at UFC 193. However, Macário pulled out of the bout in late September citing injury and was replaced by James Moontasri. In turn, Macario was released from the promotion.

=== Post-UFC career ===
After winning two fights in the regional circuit in his native Brazil, he signed with Legacy Fighting Alliance. Macário made his promotional debut against Ramiz Brahimaj at LFA 47 and lost by way of guillotine choke in the second round.

Macário faced Josh Burkman at Legacy Fighting Alliance 66 on May 10, 2019. He won the fight via split decision.

On July 28, 2020, it was announced that Macário had signed a contract with Taura MMA. He made his promotional debut against Will Chope at Taura MMA 11 on October 30, 2020. He lost the fight via unanimous decision.

Macário faced Lucas Paredes on July 29, 2021, at Nação Cyborg 9. He won the bout in the first round via KO, winning the NC Welterweight Championship in the process.

Macário was scheduled to face Ramazan Kuramagomedov at UAE Warriors 22 on September 4, 2021. However, Macário withdrew from the bout and was replaced by Matias Juarez.

Macário faced Shimon Smotritsky on December 18, 2021, at RCC 10. He lost the bout via TKO in the second round.

Macário faced Luan Santiago on September 25, 2022, at Fight Music Show 2. He lost the bout via TKO stoppage after getting dropped by a punch and finished on the ground with elbows 22 seconds into the bout.

== Championships and Accomplishments ==
- Ultimate Fighting Championship
  - The Ultimate Fighter: Brazil 2 Welterweight Tournament Finalist

== Mixed martial arts record ==
Professional record breakdown
18 matches	11 wins	7 losses
By knockout	7	4
By submission	1	2
By decision	3	1

Res.	Record	Opponent	Method	Event	Date	Round	Time	Location	Notes
Loss	11–7	Luan Santiago	KO (punches)	Fight Music Show 2	September 25, 2022	1	0:22	Curitiba, Brazil	
Loss	11–6	Shimon Smotritsky	TKO (punches)	RCC 10	December 18, 2021	2	2:03	Yekaterinburg, Russia	
Win	11–5	Lucas Paredes	KO (punch)	Nação Cyborg 9	July 29, 2021	1	1:50	Paraná, Brazil	For the vacant NC Welterweight Championship.
Loss	10–5	Rico Farrington	Decision (unanimous)	Taura MMA 11	October 30, 2020	3	5:00	Kissimmee, Florida, United States	
Win	10–4	Josh Burkman	Decision (split)	LFA 66	May 10, 2019	3	5:00	West Valley City, Utah, United States	
Loss	9–4	Ramiz Brahimaj	Technical Submission (guillotine choke)	LFA 47	August 10, 2018	2	2:34	Dallas, Texas, United States	
Win	9–3	Handeson Ferreira	Decision (split)	F2N: Fight2Night2	April 28, 2017	3	5:00	Foz do Iguaçu, Brazil	
Win	8–3	Bojan Kosednar	TKO (punches)	F2N: Fight2Night	November 4, 2016	1	N/A	Rio de Janeiro, Brazil	
Loss	7–3	Matt Dwyer	KO (Superman punch)	UFC Fight Night: Bigfoot vs. Mir	February 22, 2015	1	3:14	Porto Alegre, Brazil	
Loss	7–2	Neil Magny	TKO (punches)	UFC 179	October 25, 2014	3	2:40	Rio de Janeiro, Brazil	
Win	7–1	Bobby Voelker	Decision (unanimous)	UFC 168	December 28, 2013	3	5:00	Las Vegas, Nevada, United States	
Loss	6–1	Leonardo Santos	Submission (arm-triangle choke)	UFC on Fuel TV: Nogueira vs. Werdum	June 8, 2013	2	4:43	Fortaleza, Brazil	Lost The Ultimate Fighter: Brazil 2.
Win	6–0	Paulo Silva	Submission (rear-naked choke)	Ibiuna Fight	June 30, 2012	1	1:56	Ibiúna, Brazil	
Win	5–0	Roger Berger	TKO (punches)	WOCS 17	December 17, 2011	1	2:40	Rio de Janeiro, Brazil	
Win	4–0	Gabriel Monkey	TKO (punches)	Rio FC 5	March 26, 2011	2	0:46	Rio de Janeiro, Brazil	
Win	3–0	Lucas Rosa	TKO (punches)	Rio FC 4	January 29, 2011	1	1:54	Rio de Janeiro, Brazil	
Win	2–0	Romulo Silva	TKO (punches)	BPTC: K-1 Super Kombat 2	November 27, 2011	1	1:30	São João de Meriti, Brazil	
Win	1–0	Gilmar Milhorance	TKO (punches)	Gringo Super Fight 2	August 15, 2010	1	0:35	Nova Iguaçu, Brazil	

== Mixed martial arts exhibition record ==
Professional record breakdown
4 matches	4 wins	0 losses
By knockout	3	0
By submission	0	0
By decision	1	0

Res.	Record	Opponent	Method	Event	Date	Round	Time	Location	Notes
Win	4–0	Viscardi Andrade	TKO (punches)	The Ultimate Fighter: Brazil 2	N/A	3	N/A	São Paulo, Brazil	Semi-finals bout.
Win	3–0	Tiago Alves	TKO (punches)	The Ultimate Fighter: Brazil 2	N/A	1	N/A	São Paulo, Brazil	Quarter-finals bout.
Win	2–0	Thiago Santos	Decision (unanimous)	The Ultimate Fighter: Brazil 2	N/A	2	5:00	São Paulo, Brazil	Preliminary bout.
Win	1–0	Roberto Barros Amorim	TKO (doctor stoppage)	The Ultimate Fighter: Brazil 2	N/A	1	N/A	São Paulo, Brazil	TUF: Brazil 2 entry bout.

== See also ==
- List of male mixed martial artists
