= Neil Magny =

American mixed martial artist (born 1987)

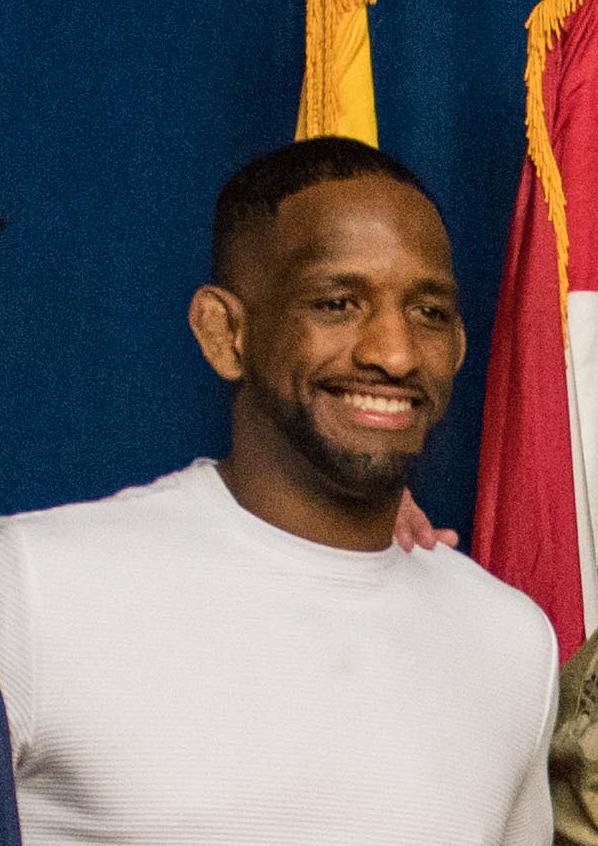
- Magny in 2019
- Born: Aoutneil Jacques Magny; August 3, 1987 (age 39); Brooklyn, New York City, U.S.
- Other names: The Haitian Sensation
- Height: 6 ft 3 in (191 cm)
- Weight: 170 lb (77 kg; 12 st 2 lb)
- Division: Welterweight (2010–2011, 2013–present); Middleweight (2011–2012)
- Reach: 80 in (203 cm)
- Fighting out of: Denver, Colorado, U.S.
- Team: H.I.T. Squad (2008–2012); Elevation Fight Team (2013–present); Easton Training Center
- Rank: Black belt in Brazilian Jiu-Jitsu
- Years active: 2010–present

Mixed martial arts record
- Total: 46
- Wins: 32
- By knockout: 10
- By submission: 5
- By decision: 17
- Losses: 14
- By knockout: 4
- By submission: 7
- By decision: 3

Other information
- Mixed martial arts record from Sherdog

Aoutneil Jacques "Neil" Magny (born August 3, 1987) is an American professional mixed martial artist. He currently competes in the Welterweight division of the Ultimate Fighting Championship (UFC). A professional since 2010, Magny made a name for himself as a competitor on The Ultimate Fighter: Team Carwin vs. Team Nelson and currently holds the record for most wins in UFC Welterweight history (25).

== Background ==
Born and raised in Brooklyn, New York, Magny is of Haitian and Dominican descent. Magny moved to Illinois at the age of 12, where he graduated from Thornwood High School in the Chicago Southland and then went to Southern Illinois University Edwardsville, where he earned a B.A. in Criminal Justice. He wrestled and played football in both high school and college.

He is also an Army veteran, having served for seven years in the Illinois National Guard, as a light-vehicle mechanic. He was deployed in Kuwait. He left the service in 2013.

== Mixed martial arts career ==
=== Early career ===
Magny began competing in MMA professionally in 2010, making his debut August 7, 2010, against Nolan Norwood for the C3 Fights promotion. Magny won the fight via submission (kimura) midway into the second round. Just a few months later, he again fought for the C3 Fights promotion, fighting against Nate Pratt, winning the fight via unanimous decision. Three weeks after his second win, Magny traveled to Indiana to fight for Cut Throat MMA on their November 6 card. He defeated Lawrence Dunning via TKO.

Magny won two more fights, bringing his overall record to 6–0, before being invited to compete in Combat USA's Wisconsin vs. Illinois championship series. Magny won his first round fight against fellow Illinois native, Quartus Stitt, via submission (triangle choke). The win moved Magny into the final round of the welterweight division tournament against a Wisconsin fighter. The final round took place on July 21, 2011, where Magny fought against Andrew Trace. Magny lost the fight via submission, marking the first time Magny had lost in his career.

Magny fought one more time before trying out for the popular reality TV series, The Ultimate Fighter.

=== The Ultimate Fighter ===
Magny was subsequently selected as a cast member of The Ultimate Fighter: Team Carwin vs. Team Nelson. He won the elimination fight in order to get into the Ultimate Fighter house by defeating Frank Camacho via decision. Magny was selected fourth (seventh overall) by Shane Carwin to be a part of his team.

In the first fight of the season, Magny was selected to fight against Brazilian Jiu-Jitsu specialist, Cameron Diffley. Magny dominated the fight throughout two rounds and won via unanimous decision.

Magny was then matched up against Team Carwin teammate and IFL and Strikeforce veteran, Bristol Marunde for the quarterfinal round. After two rounds Magny was awarded the unanimous decision victory.

Magny came up short in the semifinals after getting knocked out by Mike Ricci in the first round.

=== Ultimate Fighting Championship ===
==== 2013 ====
Magny made his UFC debut against fellow semifinalist Jon Manley on February 23, 2013, at UFC 157. He won the bout via unanimous decision.

Magny faced Sérgio Moraes on August 3, 2013, at UFC 163. He lost the fight via triangle choke in the first round.

Magny faced Seth Baczynski on November 6, 2013, at UFC Fight Night 31. He lost the back-and-forth fight via unanimous decision.

==== 2014 ====
Magny faced UFC newcomer Gasan Umalatov on February 1, 2014, at UFC 169. He effectively utilized his reach advantage in the striking department to win a unanimous decision.

Magny was expected to face William Macário at UFC Fight Night 40. However, Macário was removed from the bout for undisclosed reasons and replaced by returning veteran Tim Means. He won the fight by unanimous decision.

Magny was expected to face Cláudio Silva on June 28, 2014, at UFC Fight Night 43. However, da Silva was forced from the bout due to injury and was replaced by promotional newcomer Rodrigo Goiana de Lima. After spending much of the first round defending against de Lima's strikes and submission attempts on the ground, Magny won the fight via KO in the second round after staggering de Lima with punches throughout the round.

Magny defeated Alex Garcia via unanimous decision on August 23, 2014, at UFC Fight Night 49.

Magny next fought William Macário at UFC 179. He defeated Macário by TKO in the third round, his fifth UFC win of 2014.

==== 2015 ====
Magny was briefly linked to a bout with Josh Koscheck at UFC 184 on February 28, 2015. However, the pairing was scrapped and Koscheck faced Jake Ellenberger at the event.

Magny faced Kiichi Kunimoto on February 14, 2015, at UFC Fight Night 60. Magny defeated Kunimoto via submission in the third round, earning him his first Performance of the Night honors.

Magny faced Lim Hyun-gyu on May 16, 2015, at UFC Fight Night 66. Magny won the fight via TKO in the second round, which also produced a Performance of the Night bonus.

Magny faced Demian Maia on August 1, 2015, at UFC 190. He lost the fight by submission in the second round.

Just twenty-two days after his loss to Maia, Magny stepped in as a short notice replacement for Rick Story to face Erick Silva on August 23, 2015, at UFC Fight Night 74. He won the fight via split decision.

==== 2016 ====
Magny was expected to face Stephen Thompson on January 2, 2016, at UFC 195. However, Magny replaced Matt Brown to face Kelvin Gastelum on November 21, 2015, at The Ultimate Fighter Latin America 2 Finale. Magny won the fight by split decision Their performance earned both participants Fight of the Night honors.

Magny faced Héctor Lombard on March 20, 2016, at UFC Fight Night 85. After nearly being finished with strikes in the first round, Magny defeated Lombard via TKO in the third round. He also was awarded a Performance of the Night bonus. After this fight with Hector Lombard, Magny signed a four fight extension to his UFC contract.

Magny was expected to face Dong Hyun Kim on August 20, 2016, at UFC 202. However, Kim was removed from the fight on July 12 and was replaced by Lorenz Larkin. He lost the fight via TKO in the first round.

Magny faced Johny Hendricks on December 30, 2016, at UFC 207. At the weigh-ins, Hendricks missed weight for their bout, weighing in at 173.5 lbs. As a result, Magny received 20% of Hendricks' purse and the bout was made a catchweight fight. Magny won the fight via unanimous decision.

==== 2017 ====
Magny faced Rafael dos Anjos on September 9, 2017, at UFC 215. He lost the fight via arm-triangle choke submission in the first round.

Magny faced Carlos Condit on December 30, 2017, at UFC 219. He won the fight by unanimous decision.

==== 2018 ====
Magny was expected to face Gunnar Nelson on May 27, 2018, at UFC Fight Night 130. However, on April 28, 2018, it was reported Nelson was pulled from the event due to knee injury. On May 15, promotional newcomer Craig White was announced as Magny's new opponent. Magny won the fight via technical knock out in round one.

Magny was expected to face Alex Oliveira on September 22, 2018, at UFC Fight Night 137. However, on August 22, 2018, it was reported that Magny faced Santiago Ponzinibbio on November 10, 2018, at UFC Fight Night 140. He lost the fight via knockout.

==== 2019 ====
Magny was expected to face Elizeu Zaleski dos Santos on May 18, 2019, at UFC Fight Night 152. However, on March 28, 2019, dos Santos announced that he had not been contacted by the UFC about the match. Magny was the replacement, and expected to face Vicente Luque instead. However, it was reported on May 13, 2019, that Magny pulled out of the bout due to testing positive for Di-Hydroxy-LGD-4033.

==== 2020 ====
Magny faced Li Jingliang on March 7, 2020, at UFC 248. He won the fight by unanimous decision.

Magny faced Anthony Rocco Martin on June 6, 2020, at UFC 250. He won the bout via unanimous decision.

Magny was expected to face Geoff Neal on August 29, 2020, at UFC Fight Night 175. However, Neal withdrew from the event due to health issues and he was replaced by Robbie Lawler. He won the fight via unanimous decision. With this win, Magny earned the second most wins in the welterweight division behind Georges St-Pierre.

==== 2021 ====
Magny faced Michael Chiesa on January 20, 2021, at UFC on ESPN 20. Magny lost the fight via unanimous decision after being controlled on the ground for most of the 5 rounds.

Magny faced Geoff Neal at UFC on ESPN 24 on May 8, 2021. He won the fight via unanimous decision.

==== 2022 ====
Magny faced Max Griffin on March 26, 2022, at UFC on ESPN 33. He won the fight via split decision. With this win, Magny tied Georges St-Pierre for the most wins in the UFC welterweight division with nineteen.

Magny faced Shavkat Rakhmonov on June 25, 2022, at UFC on ESPN 38. He lost the fight via a guillotine choke submission in the second round.

Magny was scheduled to face Daniel Rodriguez on October 15, 2022, at UFC Fight Night 212. However, Rodriguez withdrew from the bout due to elbow infection. The bout was rescheduled for UFC Fight Night: Rodriguez vs. Lemos on November 5. He won the fight via D'Arce choke submission in the third round. This win earned him the Performance of the Night award.

==== 2023 ====
Magny faced Gilbert Burns on January 21, 2023, at UFC 283. He lost the fight via an arm-triangle choke submission in the first round.

Magny faced Philip Rowe on June 24, 2023, at UFC on ABC 5. He won the bout via split decision.

Stepping in as a short notice replacement for an injured Geoff Neal, Magny faced Ian Machado Garry at UFC 292 on August 19, 2023. Magny lost this bout by unanimous decision.

==== 2024 ====
Magny faced Mike Malott on January 20, 2024, at UFC 297. After being primarily dominated on the ground and suffering leg kicks throughout the fight, he came back in the third round and won the fight via technical knockout.

Magny faced Michael Morales on August 24, 2024 at UFC on ESPN 62. He lost the fight via TKO in the first round.

Magny faced Carlos Prates in the main event on November 9, 2024 at UFC Fight Night 247. He lost the fight by knockout in the first round.

==== 2025 ====
Magny was rescheduled to face Gunnar Nelson on July 19, 2025 at UFC 318. However, two weeks prior to the event, it was reported that Nelson withdrew from the fight due to a hamstring injury, so the bout was cancelled.

Shortly after Nelson withdrawing, it was reported that Magny faced Elizeu Zaleski dos Santos on August 2, 2025 at UFC on ESPN 71. Magny won the fight by technical knockout at the end of the second round.

Magny faced Jake Matthews on September 28, 2025 at UFC Fight Night 260. After dropping the first two rounds, he came back in the third round and won the fight via a brabo choke.

Magny faced former Bellator Welterweight World Champion (and promotional newcomer) Yaroslav Amosov on December 13, 2025 at UFC on ESPN 73. He lost the fight via an anaconda choke in round one.

==== 2026 ====
Magny faced Ramiz Brahimaj on August 15, 2026 at UFC 330. He won the fight in the second round by technical knockout.

== Professional grappling career ==
Magny was due to face Miguel Baeza at Fury Pro Grappling 9 on April 4, 2024. He withdrew from the match and was replaced by Guilherme Neves on short notice.

== Personal life ==
Magny and his now-separated wife have two sons, the first born in 2020 and the second in 2023.

== Championships and accomplishments ==
=== Mixed martial arts ===
- Ultimate Fighting Championship
  - Fight of the Night (One time) vs. Kelvin Gastelum
  - Performance of the Night (Four times) vs. Kiichi Kunimoto, Hyun Gyu Lim, Hector Lombard, and Daniel Rodriguez
  - Most wins in UFC Welterweight division history (25)
    - Tied (Charles Oliveira) for second most wins in UFC history (25) (behind Jim Miller)
    - Tied (Charles Oliveira & Dan Henderson) for fourth most wins in Zuffa, LLC (UFC, Pride, WEC, Strikeforce) history (25)
  - Most fight time in UFC Welterweight division history (7:31:09)
    - Fifth most total fight time in UFC history (7:31:09)
  - Most bouts in UFC Welterweight division history (38)
    - Tied (Donald Cerrone) for third most bouts in UFC history (38)
  - Tied (Roger Huerta & Kevin Holland) for most wins in a calendar year (5 wins in 2014)
    - Tied (Kevin Holland) for the only fighters in UFC history to have 5 bouts-per-calendar year twice (2014 & 2015 - 9 wins)
  - Tied (Brad Tavares) for most decision wins in UFC history (14)
    - Tied (Georges St-Pierre) for third most unanimous decision wins in UFC Welterweight division history (10)
    - Tied for sixth most unanimous decision wins in UFC history (10)
    - Most decision bouts in UFC Welterweight division history (17)
    - Most split decision wins in UFC Welterweight division history (4)
    - Tied for fourth most split decision wins in UFC history (4)
  - Most significant strikes landed in UFC Welterweight division history (1530)
    - Most total strikes landed in UFC Welterweight division history (2790)
    - Third most total strikes landed in UFC history (2790)
  - Tied (Thiago Alves, Li Jingliang & Vicente Luque) for second most knockouts in UFC Welterweight division history (8) (behind Matt Brown)
  - Tied (Matt Hughes) for third most finishes in UFC Welterweight division history (11)
  - Third most takedowns landed in UFC Welterweight division history (64)
  - Holds wins over three former UFC champions — Johny Hendricks, Robbie Lawler & Carlos Condit (interim)
  - UFC Honors Awards
    - 2024: Fan's Choice Comeback of the Year Nominee vs. Mike Malott
  - UFC.com Awards
    - 2014: Ranked #10 Fighter of the Year
    - 2015: Ranked #10 Fighter of the Year
- Combat Press
  - 2016 Comeback of the Year vs. Héctor Lombard at UFC Fight Night: Hunt vs. Mir
- MMA Junkie
  - 2024 Comeback of the Year vs. Mike Malott at UFC 297

== Mixed martial arts record ==
Professional record breakdown
46 matches	32 wins	14 losses
By knockout	10	4
By submission	5	7
By decision	17	3

Res.	Record	Opponent	Method	Event	Date	Round	Time	Location	Notes
Win	32–14	Ramiz Brahimaj	TKO (punches)	UFC 330	August 15, 2026	2	3:20	Philadelphia, Pennsylvania, United States	
Loss	31–14	Yaroslav Amosov	Submission (anaconda choke)	UFC on ESPN: Royval vs. Kape	December 13, 2025	1	3:14	Las Vegas, Nevada, United States	
Win	31–13	Jake Matthews	Submission (brabo choke)	UFC Fight Night: Ulberg vs. Reyes	September 28, 2025	3	3:08	Perth, Australia	
Win	30–13	Elizeu Zaleski dos Santos	TKO (punches)	UFC on ESPN: Taira vs. Park	August 2, 2025	2	4:39	Las Vegas, Nevada, United States	
Loss	29–13	Carlos Prates	KO (punch)	UFC Fight Night: Magny vs. Prates	November 9, 2024	1	4:50	Las Vegas, Nevada, United States	
Loss	29–12	Michael Morales	TKO (punches)	UFC on ESPN: Cannonier vs. Borralho	August 24, 2024	1	4:39	Las Vegas, Nevada, United States	
Win	29–11	Mike Malott	TKO (punches)	UFC 297	January 20, 2024	3	4:45	Toronto, Ontario, Canada	
Loss	28–11	Ian Machado Garry	Decision (unanimous)	UFC 292	August 19, 2023	3	5:00	Boston, Massachusetts, United States	
Win	28–10	Philip Rowe	Decision (split)	UFC on ABC: Emmett vs. Topuria	June 24, 2023	3	5:00	Jacksonville, Florida, United States	
Loss	27–10	Gilbert Burns	Submission (arm-triangle choke)	UFC 283	January 21, 2023	1	4:15	Rio de Janeiro, Brazil	
Win	27–9	Daniel Rodriguez	Submission (brabo choke)	UFC Fight Night: Rodriguez vs. Lemos	November 5, 2022	3	3:33	Las Vegas, Nevada, United States	Performance of the Night.
Loss	26–9	Shavkat Rakhmonov	Submission (guillotine choke)	UFC on ESPN: Tsarukyan vs. Gamrot	June 25, 2022	2	4:58	Las Vegas, Nevada, United States	
Win	26–8	Max Griffin	Decision (split)	UFC on ESPN: Blaydes vs. Daukaus	March 26, 2022	3	5:00	Columbus, Ohio, United States	
Win	25–8	Geoff Neal	Decision (unanimous)	UFC on ESPN: Rodriguez vs. Waterson	May 8, 2021	3	5:00	Las Vegas, Nevada, United States	
Loss	24–8	Michael Chiesa	Decision (unanimous)	UFC on ESPN: Chiesa vs. Magny	January 20, 2021	5	5:00	Abu Dhabi, United Arab Emirates	
Win	24–7	Robbie Lawler	Decision (unanimous)	UFC Fight Night: Smith vs. Rakić	August 29, 2020	3	5:00	Las Vegas, Nevada, United States	
Win	23–7	Anthony Rocco Martin	Decision (unanimous)	UFC 250	June 6, 2020	3	5:00	Las Vegas, Nevada, United States	
Win	22–7	Li Jingliang	Decision (unanimous)	UFC 248	March 7, 2020	3	5:00	Las Vegas, Nevada, United States	
Loss	21–7	Santiago Ponzinibbio	KO (punch)	UFC Fight Night: Magny vs. Ponzinibbio	November 17, 2018	4	2:36	Buenos Aires, Argentina	
Win	21–6	Craig White	KO (knee and punches)	UFC Fight Night: Thompson vs. Till	May 27, 2018	1	4:32	Liverpool, England	
Win	20–6	Carlos Condit	Decision (unanimous)	UFC 219	December 30, 2017	3	5:00	Las Vegas, Nevada, United States	
Loss	19–6	Rafael dos Anjos	Submission (arm-triangle choke)	UFC 215	September 9, 2017	1	3:43	Edmonton, Alberta, Canada	
Win	19–5	Johny Hendricks	Decision (unanimous)	UFC 207	December 30, 2016	3	5:00	Las Vegas, Nevada, United States	Catchweight (173.5 lb) bout; Hendricks missed weight.
Loss	18–5	Lorenz Larkin	TKO (elbows)	UFC 202	August 20, 2016	1	4:08	Las Vegas, Nevada, United States	
Win	18–4	Héctor Lombard	TKO (punches)	UFC Fight Night: Hunt vs. Mir	March 20, 2016	3	0:46	Brisbane, Australia	Performance of the Night.
Win	17–4	Kelvin Gastelum	Decision (split)	The Ultimate Fighter Latin America 2 Finale: Magny vs. Gastelum	November 21, 2015	5	5:00	Monterrey, Mexico	Fight of the Night.
Win	16–4	Erick Silva	Decision (split)	UFC Fight Night: Holloway vs. Oliveira	August 23, 2015	3	5:00	Saskatoon, Saskatchewan, Canada	
Loss	15–4	Demian Maia	Submission (rear-naked choke)	UFC 190	August 1, 2015	2	2:52	Rio de Janeiro, Brazil	
Win	15–3	Lim Hyun-gyu	TKO (punches)	UFC Fight Night: Edgar vs. Faber	May 16, 2015	2	1:24	Pasay, Philippines	Performance of the Night.
Win	14–3	Kiichi Kunimoto	Submission (rear-naked choke)	UFC Fight Night: Henderson vs. Thatch	February 14, 2015	3	1:22	Broomfield, Colorado, United States	Performance of the Night.
Win	13–3	William Macário	TKO (punches)	UFC 179	October 25, 2014	3	2:40	Rio de Janeiro, Brazil	Tied UFC record for most wins in a calendar year (5).
Win	12–3	Alex Garcia	Decision (unanimous)	UFC Fight Night: Henderson vs. dos Anjos	August 23, 2014	3	5:00	Tulsa, Oklahoma, United States	
Win	11–3	Rodrigo de Lima	KO (punches)	UFC Fight Night: Te Huna vs. Marquardt	June 28, 2014	2	2:32	Auckland, New Zealand	
Win	10–3	Tim Means	Decision (unanimous)	UFC Fight Night: Brown vs. Silva	May 10, 2014	3	5:00	Cincinnati, Ohio, United States	
Win	9–3	Gasan Umalatov	Decision (unanimous)	UFC 169	February 1, 2014	3	5:00	Newark, New Jersey, United States	
Loss	8–3	Seth Baczynski	Decision (unanimous)	UFC: Fight for the Troops 3	November 6, 2013	3	5:00	Fort Campbell, Kentucky, United States	
Loss	8–2	Sérgio Moraes	Submission (triangle choke)	UFC 163	August 3, 2013	1	3:13	Rio de Janeiro, Brazil	
Win	8–1	Jon Manley	Decision (unanimous)	UFC 157	February 23, 2013	3	5:00	Anaheim, California, United States	Return to Welterweight.
Win	7–1	Daniel Sandmann	Decision (unanimous)	Hoosier Fight Club 10	February 11, 2012	3	5:00	Valparaiso, Indiana, United States	
Loss	6–1	Andrew Trace	Submission (guillotine choke)	Combat USA 30	July 21, 2011	1	3:10	Oshkosh, Wisconsin, United States	Middleweight debut.
Win	6–0	Quartus Stitt	Submission (triangle choke)	Combat USA 27	May 14, 2011	2	0:38	Racine, Wisconsin, United States	
Win	5–0	Kevin Nowaczyk	Decision (unanimous)	Hoosier Fight Club 7	April 9, 2011	3	5:00	Valparaiso, Indiana, United States	
Win	4–0	Darion Terry	TKO (punches)	Rumble Time Promotions 7	November 19, 2010	3	2:13	St. Charles, Missouri, United States	
Win	3–0	Lawrence Dunning	TKO (punches)	Cut Throat MMA 1	November 6, 2010	2	3:09	Hammond, Indiana, United States	
Win	2–0	Nate Pratt	Decision (unanimous)	C3 Fights 6	October 22, 2010	3	5:00	Newkirk, Oklahoma, United States	
Win	1–0	Nolan Norwood	Submission (kimura)	C3 Fights 5	August 7, 2010	2	2:44	Newkirk, Oklahoma, United States	

=== Mixed martial arts exhibition record ===
Exhibition record breakdown		
4 matches	3 wins	1 loss
By knockout	0	1
By decision	3	0

Res.	Record	Opponent	Method	Event	Date	Round	Time	Location	Notes
Loss	3–1	Mike Ricci	KO (elbow)	The Ultimate Fighter: Team Carwin vs. Team Nelson	September 12, 2012	1	4:12	Las Vegas, Nevada, United States	The Ultimate Fighter 16 Semi-Final round
Win	3–0	Bristol Marunde	Decision (unanimous)	The Ultimate Fighter: Team Carwin vs. Team Nelson	September 4, 2012	2	5:00	Las Vegas, Nevada, United States	The Ultimate Fighter 16 Quarter-Final round
Win	2–0	Cameron Diffley	Decision (unanimous)	The Ultimate Fighter: Team Carwin vs. Team Nelson	August 6, 2012	2	5:00	Las Vegas, Nevada, United States	The Ultimate Fighter 16 Preliminary round
Win	1–0	Frank Camacho	Decision (unanimous)	The Ultimate Fighter: Team Carwin vs. Team Nelson	July 31, 2012	3	5:00	Las Vegas, Nevada, United States	The Ultimate Fighter 16 Elimination round

== See also ==
- List of current UFC fighters
- List of male mixed martial artists
