= David Vieira (fighter) =

Brazilian mixed martial arts fighter

- Born: David Vieira da Silva; February 28, 1982 (age 44); Rio de Janeiro, Brazil
- Height: 6 ft 2 in (1.88 m)
- Weight: 170 lb (77 kg; 12 st)
- Division: Welterweight
- Reach: 78 in (198 cm)
- Fighting out of: Tampa, Florida, United States
- Team: DVBJJ
- Rank: 5th degree black belt in Brazilian jiu-jitsu
- Years active: White belt 2000, blue belt 2002, purple belt 2003, brown belt 2004, black belt 2005, 1st degree black belt 2008, 2nd degree black belt 2011, 3rd degree black belt 2014, 4th degree black belt 2019 and 5th degree black belt 2024

Mixed martial arts record
- Total: 5
- Wins: 5
- By submission: 5
- Losses: 0

Other information
- Mixed martial arts record from Sherdog

David Vieira
Medal record

Main Brazilian jiu-jitsu tournaments (Brazil) (United States) (Portugal)

World Championship
Bronze medal – third place	2026 Las Vegas	-97.5kg
Gold medal – first place	2024 Las Vegas	-97.5kg
Gold medal – first place	2023 Las Vegas	-97.5kg
Gold medal – first place	2022 Las Vegas	-97.5kg
Gold medal – first place	2018 Rio de Janeiro	-91.5kg
Silver medal – second place	2004 Rio de Janeiro	Absolute
Silver medal – second place	2003 Rio de Janeiro	Absolute
Gold medal – first place	2002 Rio de Janeiro	-79.5kg
Gold medal – first place	2002 Rio de Janeiro	Absolute

Copa Podio
Gold medal – first place	2019 Vieira vs Thales Leites	-91.5kg
Gold medal – first place	2016 Vieira vs Robson Gracie	-91.5kg

National Championship
Gold medal – first place	2019 Rio de Janeiro	-91.5kg
Bronze medal – third place	2017 Rio de Janeiro	-91.5kg (NoGI)
Gold medal – first place	2015 Rio de Janeiro	-91.5kg (NoGI)
Gold medal – first place	2015 Rio de Janeiro	-91.5kg
Gold medal – first place	2005 Rio de Janeiro	-85.5kg
Silver medal – second place	2005 Rio de Janeiro	Absolute
Bronze medal – third place	2003 Rio de Janeiro	-79.5kg
Gold medal – first place	2003 Rio de Janeiro	Absolute
Bronze medal – third place	2001 Rio de Janeiro	-79.5kg

State Championship
Gold medal – first place	2014 Rio de Janeiro	-85.5kg (NoGI)
Gold medal – first place	2011 Rio de Janeiro	-85.5kg (NoGI)
Gold medal – first place	2005 2nd Rio de Janeiro	-85.5kg
Gold medal – first place	2005 1st Rio de Janeiro	-85.5kg
Gold medal – first place	2005 1st Rio de Janeiro	Absolute
Gold medal – first place	2003 3rd Rio de Janeiro	-79.5kg
Gold medal – first place	2003 1st Rio de Janeiro	-79.5kg
Silver medal – second place	2002 2nd Rio de Janeiro	-79.5kg
Gold medal – first place	2002 3rd São Paulo	-79.5kg
Gold medal – first place	2002 2nd São Paulo	-79.5kg
Gold medal – first place	2002 1st São Paulo	-79.5kg

European Championship
Bronze medal – third place	2011 Portugal	-85.5kg
Bronze medal – third place	2009 Portugal	-85.5kg

Pan American Championship
Silver medal – second place	2023 Kissimmee	-97.5kg
Gold medal – first place	2017 Rio de Janeiro	-91.5kg
Gold medal – first place	2017 Rio de Janeiro	Absolute
Bronze medal – third place	2006 Los Angeles	-85.5kg
Silver medal – second place	2004 Los Angeles	-85.5kg
Silver medal – second place	2002 Orlando	-79.5kg

International Open Championship
Gold medal – first place	2026 Fort Lauderdale	-91.5kg
Gold medal – first place	2018 Rio de Janeiro	-91.5kg
Gold medal – first place	2018 Florianopolis	-91.5kg
Gold medal – first place	2018 Florianopolis	Absolute (NoGI)
Gold medal – first place	2018 Florianopolis	-91.5kg (NoGI)
Bronze medal – third place	2018 Florianopolis	Absolute
Gold medal – first place	2017 São Paulo	-91.5kg
Gold medal – first place	2016 Curitiba	-91.5kg
Gold medal – first place	2016 Curitiba	-91.5kg
Gold medal – first place	2015 Florianopolis	-91.5kg
Gold medal – first place	2015 Florianopolis	Absolute
Gold medal – first place	2015 Florianopolis	-91.5kg (NoGI)
Gold medal – first place	2015 Florianopolis	Absolute (NoGI)
Silver medal – second place	2015 Curitiba	-91.5kg
Gold medal – first place	2014 São Paulo	-85.5kg
Gold medal – first place	2014 São Paulo	Absolute
Gold medal – first place	2014 São Paulo	-85.5kg (NoGI)
Gold medal – first place	2014 São Paulo	Absolute (NoGI)

NAGA Grappling Championship
Gold medal – first place	2007 Miami	-85.5kg
Gold medal – first place	2006 Miami	-85.5kg
Gold medal – first place	2006 Miami	-85.5kg

Absolute/open weight class

David Vieira is a Brazilian Jiu-Jitsu (BJJ) 5th-degree black belt, competitor, instructor, and professional Mixed Martial Artist (MMA). He is a multiple-time IBJJF World Champion, recognized for his achievements in competitive grappling and his contributions to Brazilian Jiu-Jitsu as a competitor and instructor.

== Background ==
Vieira was born and raised in Rio de Janeiro, Brazil, and was seventeen when he started practicing Brazilian Jiu-Jitsu. His first instructors were Alexandre de Lima and Rogerio Poggio at Infight Jiu-Jitsu Academy in Rio de Janeiro.

After winning gold in the -77 kg and Absolute divisions of the World Jiu-Jitsu Championship in 2002, Vieira went to São Paulo to train with the founder of Infight Academy, 6th degree BJJ black belt Totila 'Pitoco' Jordan Neto.

In 2004, Vieira came to the United States to compete at the Pan American Championship. There, he was introduced to Gracie Barra by Eduardo de Lima. When Vieira went back to Brazil, he joined Gracie Barra Academy, where in 2005 he was awarded his black belt.

Currently Vieira holds gold medals as a six-time Brazilian Jiu-Jitsu World Champion, 5-time National Champion (in both GI and No GI), 10-time State Champion (in both GI and No GI), two-time Pan American Champion, and 15-time International Open Champion (in both GI and No GI). As a Brazilian jiu-jitsu (BJJ) and mixed martial arts (MMA) competitor, he is also an instructor, and has coached students who have won titles in BJJ, MMA, and grappling tournaments.

Vieira was the founder and head instructor of DVBJJ Academy in 2006, located in Tampa, Florida, with affiliated schools in Brazil, France, Morocco, Belgium, United States and Australia.

In early 2022, Vieira moved to the United States and teamed up with Ross Kellin, founder of Champions MMA.

=== BJJ black belts ===
Vieira has awarded black belts to:

- 2008: Ciro Moura (Brazil) and Chad Robichaux (USA)
- 2010: Hammoud Soufiane (France) and Antoine Bachelin (France)
- 2012: Hicham Hakam (first BJJ black belt in Morocco) and Diego Lander (Brazil)
- 2013: Abderrahim Bounouch (Belgium), Rodrigo Calazans (Brazil), Rafael Garritano (Brazil), Joao M. Madureira (Brazil), Rafael Lopes (Brazil), Marcelo Carvalho (Brazil), Nick Antunes (Brazil) and Marcio Moreira (Brazil)
- 2017: Ricardo Rodrigues (Brazil), Renzzo Caenazzo (Brazil), Henrique Oliveira (Brazil), Daniel Albuquerque (Brazil), Eduardo Liberman (Brazil) and Wilhiam Almeida (Australia)
- 2025: Joseph Hicks (USA), Charlotte Hicks (USA)

=== BJJ highlights ===
Vieira's notable wins via submission:

- Thales Leites from Nova Uniao via choke
- Sergio Moraes from Alliance Jiu Jitsu via triangle choke
- Tarsis Humphreys from Alliance Jiu Jitsu via choke
- Delson Heleno form Gordo Jiu-Jitsu via choke
- Vagner Rocha from Team Popovitch 2x via triangle choke and armlock
- Vinicius Marinho from GFTeam via choke
- Mario "Big Hurt" Rinaldi from ATT via rear naked choke
- Moacir "Boca" Oliveira from Team De La Riva via armlock

== Mixed martial arts career ==
=== Early career ===
Vieira became a professional MMA fighter in 2007. That same year, he was featured in the MMA Authority Magazine as the new up-and-coming fighter, and was described by the magazine as the "Brazilian Prodigy." After four successful MMA fights in the United States, he went back to Brazil to improve his MMA game and become a more complete fighter. He continued his MMA training, but took some time off from professional MMA fighting to focus on running his jiu-jitsu school in Brazil.

=== The Ultimate Fighter: Brazil ===
Vieira was chosen from a list of over 300 applicants at The Ultimate Fighter tryouts in Rio de Janeiro. Ranging from 18 to 35 years of age, these fighters came from all corners of Brazil, as well as countries such as Argentina and the United States. The fighters underwent interviews and medical exams, and were tested on their striking and grappling skills, until the final 28 emerged.

The group of 28 welterweights battled it out in elimination scraps in episodes one and two, until only half of them remained. The 14 winners became the official cast members of The Ultimate Fighter house, where they were divided into two opposing teams.

Episode One: In March 2013, it was revealed that Vieira was a cast member of The Ultimate Fighter: Brazil 2.

Episode Two: Vieira won his elimination fight to get into the TUF house, defeating Leandro Silva (11-0) by unanimous decision. He was chosen as a member of Team Nogueira.

Episode Three: In his second fight, Vieira clashed with another undefeated fighter, Yan Cabral (10-0), and lost by submission in the second round.

Episode Nine: Luis Dutra had to withdraw due to injury, and Vieira was chosen to replace his teammate. It was announced that he would face the experienced Viscardi Andrade in the quarterfinals.

Episode Ten: Vieira lost his quarterfinals match by unanimous decision to Andrade, ending his run at becoming the next Ultimate Fighter.

=== Mixed martial arts record ===
Professional record breakdown
5 matches	5 wins	0 losses
By knockout	0	0
By submission	5	0
By decision	0	0

Res.	Record	Opponent	Method	Event	Date	Round	Time	Location	Notes
Win	5–0	(Brazil) Andre Chatuba	Submission (rear naked choke)	Fight for Life 3	April 4, 2019	1	1:38	Rio de Janeiro, BRAZIL	Fought at 185
Win	4–0	(United States) Efrain Ruiz	Submission (rear naked choke)	WFC VI	March 22, 2008	1	3:26	Florida, US	Fought at 170
Win	3–0	(United States) Zack Barrios	Submission (rear naked choke)	RFC XI	February 23, 2008	1	1:22	Florida, US	Fought at 170
Win	2–0	(United States) Benjamin Jordan	Submission (triangle choke)	WFC IV	July 13, 2007	1	2:42	Florida, US	Fought at 170
Win	1–0	(United States) Fred Salsaverda	Submission (triangle choke)	WFC III	April 7, 2007	1	1:28	Florida, US	Fought at 170

=== Mixed martial arts exhibition record ===
Exhibition record breakdown		
3 matches	1 win	2 losses
By knockout	0	0
By submission	0	1
By decision	1	1

Res.	Record	Opponent	Method	Event	Date	Round	Time	Location	Notes
Loss	1–2	(Brazil) Viscardi Andrade	Decision	The Ultimate Fighter: Brazil 2	N/A	2	5:00	São Paulo, Brazil	Fought at 170
Loss	1–1	(Brazil) Yan Cabral	Submission (rear-naked choke)	The Ultimate Fighter: Brazil 2	N/A	2	2:59	São Paulo, Brazil	Fought at 170
Win	1–0	(Brazil) Leandro Silva	Decision	The Ultimate Fighter: Brazil 2	N/A	2	5:00	São Paulo, Brazil	Fought at 170

== Reality TV show ==
At the end of 2010, Vieira was invited to be in a reality show in Brazil that aired nationwide on the Multishow channel in May 2011. Minha Praia (Portuguese for "My Beach") is an original reality television adventure/reward game show in which teams of two people, men and women, compete for prizes. Contestants are isolated on a secluded beach in Brazil. The show uses a system of progressive elimination, allowing the contestants to vote off other rival team members. At the end of the show, Vieira and his teammate Mirella Vieira finished as runner-up, after they lost in the final round of elimination in a kayak competition.

== See also ==
- List of Brazilian Jiu-Jitsu practitioners
