= 2013 in UFC =

Mixed martial arts events

Information
- First date: January 19
- Last date: December 28

Events
- Total events: 33
- UFC: 13
- UFC on Fox: 4
- UFC on FX: 2
- UFC on Fuel TV: 4
- UFC Fight Night: 8
- TUF Finale events: 2

Fights
- Total fights: 386
- Title fights: 19

Chronology
2012 in UFC	2013 in UFC	2014 in UFC

The year 2013 was the 21st year in the history of the Ultimate Fighting Championship (UFC), a mixed martial arts promotion based in the United States. 2013 started with UFC on FX: Belfort vs. Bisping. 2013 also saw the introduction of the women's bantamweight weight class with UFC 157: Rousey vs. Carmouche.

== 2013 UFC.com awards ==
2013 UFC.COM Awards
No	Best Fighter	The Upsets	The Submissions	The Newcomers	The Knockouts	The Imports	The Fights
1	Chris Weidman	Chris Weidman defeats Anderson Silva 1 UFC 162	Anthony Pettis defeats Benson Henderson; UFC 164	Brandon Thatch	Chris Weidman defeats Anderson Silva 1 UFC 162	Ronda Rousey	Jon Jones defeats Alexander Gustafsson 1 UFC 165
2	Demetrious Johnson	Antônio Silva defeats Alistair Overeem; UFC 156	Kenny Robertson defeats Brock Jardine; UFC 157	Conor McGregor	Vitor Belfort defeats Dan Henderson 2 UFC Fight Night: Belfort vs. Henderson 2	Daniel Cormier	Wanderlei Silva defeats Brian Stann; UFC on Fuel TV: Silva vs. Stann
3	Vitor Belfort	TJ Grant defeats Gray Maynard; UFC 160	Ronaldo Souza defeats Chris Camozzi; UFC on FX: Belfort vs. Rockhold	Kelvin Gastelum	Maurício Rua defeats James Te Huna; UFC Fight Night: Hunt vs. Bigfoot	Ronaldo Souza	Mark Hunt draws with Antônio Silva 1 UFC Fight Night: Hunt vs. Bigfoot
4	Urijah Faber	Stipe Miocic defeats Roy Nelson; UFC 161	Ronda Rousey defeats Liz Carmouche; UFC 157	Ryan LaFlare	Renan Barão defeats Eddie Wineland; UFC 165	Gilbert Melendez	Gilbert Melendez defeats Diego Sanchez; UFC 166
5	Travis Browne	Robbie Lawler defeats Rory MacDonald 1 UFC 167	Antônio Braga Neto defeats Anthony Smith; UFC on Fuel TV: Nogueira vs. Werdum	Lim Hyun-gyu	Junior dos Santos defeats Mark Hunt; UFC 160	Tyron Woodley	Johny Hendricks defeats Carlos Condit; UFC 158
6	Anthony Pettis	Michael Johnson defeats Joe Lauzon; UFC Fight Night: Shogun vs. Sonnen	Fabrício Werdum defeats Antônio Rogério Nogueira; UFC on Fuel TV: Nogueira vs. Werdum	Sara McMann	Vitor Belfort defeats Luke Rockhold; UFC on FX: Belfort vs. Rockhold	Bobby Green	Dennis Bermudez defeats Matt Grice; UFC 157
7	Cain Velasquez	Kelvin Gastelum defeats Uriah Hall; The Ultimate Fighter: Team Jones vs. Team Sonnen Finale	The Faber Trifecta - Urijah Faber defeats Ivan Menjivar at UFC 157; Scott Jorgensen at The Ultimate Fighter: Team Jones vs. Team Sonnen Finale; Michael McDonald at UFC on Fox: Johnson vs. Benavidez 2	Cat Zingano	Antônio Silva defeats Alistair Overeem; UFC 156	Tim Kennedy	Demetrious Johnson defeats John Dodson 1 UFC on Fox: Johnson vs. Dodson
8	Robbie Lawler	Antônio Rogério Nogueira defeats Rashad Evans; UFC 156	Sérgio Moraes defeats Neil Magny; UFC 163	Chris Holdsworth	Wanderlei Silva defeats Brian Stann; UFC on Fuel TV: Silva vs. Stann	Alexis Davis	Chris Weidman defeats Anderson Silva 1 UFC 162
9	Georges St-Pierre	Reza Madadi defeats Michael Johnson; UFC on Fuel TV: Mousasi vs. Latifi	Piotr Hallmann defeats Francisco Trinaldo; UFC Fight Night: Teixeira vs. Bader	Ali Bagautinov	Lyoto Machida defeats Mark Muñoz; UFC Fight Night: Machida vs. Muñoz	Amanda Nunes	Ronda Rousey defeats Miesha Tate; UFC 168
10	Jon Jones	Renée Forte defeats Terry Etim; UFC on Fuel TV: Barão vs. McDonald	Brendan Schaub defeats Matt Mitrione; UFC 165	Jessica Eye	Demetrious Johnson defeats Joseph Benavidez 2 UFC on Fox: Johnson vs. Benavidez 2	Yoel Romero	Georges St-Pierre defeats Johny Hendricks; UFC 167
Ref							

== Debut UFC fighters ==
The following fighters fought their first UFC fight in 2013:

ISO	Fighter	Division
(United States)	Adam Cella	Middleweight
(Russia)	Adlan Amagov	Welterweight
(Brazil)	Adriano Martins	Lightweight
(Brazil)	Alan Patrick	Lightweight
(Dominican Republic)	Alex Garcia	Welterweight
(Canada)	Alexis Davis	Women's Bantamweight
(Russia)	Ali Bagautinov	Flyweight
(Turkey)	Alptekin Özkiliç	Flyweight
(Brazil)	Amanda Nunes	Women's Bantamweight
(United States)	Andre Fili	Featherweight
(United States)	Anthony Lapsley	Welterweight
(United States)	Anthony Smith	Middleweight
(Brazil)	Antonio Braga Neto	Middleweight
(Australia)	Ben Wall	Lightweight
(Brazil)	Bethe Correia	Women's Bantamweight
(United States)	Bobby Green	Lightweight
(United States)	Bobby Voelker	Welterweight
(United States)	Brandon Thatch	Welterweight
(United States)	Brian Houston	Middleweight
(United States)	Brian Melancon	Welterweight
(United States)	Bristol Marunde	Middleweight
(Brazil)	Bruno Santos	Middleweight
(United States)	Bubba McDaniel	Middleweight
(United States)	Caros Fodor	Lightweight
(United States)	Cat Zingano	Women's Bantamweight
(United States)	Chris Holdsworth	Bantamweight
(United States)	Clint Hester	Middleweight
(United States)	Collin Hart	Middleweight
(Republic of Ireland)	Conor McGregor	Featherweight
(United States)	Daniel Cormier	Heavyweight
(Poland)	Daniel Omielańczuk	Heavyweight
(Brazil)	Daniel Sarafian	Middleweight
(United States)	Darrell Montague	Flyweight
(England)	Davey Grant	Bantamweight
(United States)	Drew Dober	Lightweight
(United States)	Dustin Kimura	Bantamweight
(United States)	Dustin Ortiz	Flyweight
(New Zealand)	Dylan Andrews	Middleweight
(United States)	Eddie Mendez	Middleweight
(Brazil)	Elias Silvério	Lightweight
(United States)	Estevan Payan	Featherweight
(Brazil)	Francimar Barroso	Light Heavyweight
(United States)	Garett Whiteley	Lightweight
(Netherlands)	Gegard Mousasi	Middleweight
(Netherlands)	Germaine de Randamie	Women's Bantamweight

ISO	Fighter	Division
(United States)	Gian Villante	Light Heavyweight
(United States)	Gilbert Melendez	Lightweight
(United States)	Gilbert Smith	Middleweight
(Brazil)	Godofredo Pepey	Featherweight
(South Korea)	Hyun Gyu Lim	Welterweight
(Brazil)	Igor Araújo	Welterweight
(Brazil)	Ildemar Alcântara	Light Heavyweight
(Brazil)	Iliarde Santos	Flyweight
(Sweden)	Ilir Latifi	Light Heavyweight
(United States)	Isaac Vallie-Flagg	Lightweight
(Brazil)	Ivan Jorge	Lightweight
(United States)	James Krause	Lightweight
(United States)	James Vick	Lightweight
(United States)	Jared Rosholt	Heavyweight
(United States)	Jessamyn Duke	Women's Bantamweight
(Canada)	Jesse Ronson	Lightweight
(Brazil)	Jéssica Andrade	Women's Bantamweight
(United States)	Jessica Eye	Women's Flyweight
(Canada)	Jessica Rakoczy	Women's Bantamweight
(United States)	Jimmy Quinlan	Middleweight
(Brazil)	João Zeferino	Lightweight
(United States)	Jon Manley	Welterweight
(Canada)	Jordan Mein	Welterweight
(United States)	Jorge Masvidal	Lightweight
(Brazil)	Jose Maria Tome	Flyweight
(United States)	Josh Samman	Middleweight
(United States)	Josh Sampo	Flyweight
(United States)	Julianna Peña	Women's Bantamweight
(United States)	Julie Kedzie	Women's Bantamweight
(United States)	Junior Hernandez	Bantamweight
(United States)	Justin Scoggins	Flyweight
(United States)	K. J. Noons	Lightweight
(Japan)	Kazuki Tokudome	Lightweight
(United States)	Kelvin Gastelum	Welterweight
(United States)	Kevin Casey	Middleweight
(Brazil)	Kevin Souza	Featherweight
(Poland)	Krzysztof Jotko	Middleweight
(United States)	Kurt Holobaugh	Featherweight
(Japan)	Kyoji Horiguchi	Flyweight
(South Korea)	Kyung Ho Kang	Bantamweight
(Brazil)	Leandro Silva	Lightweight
(Brazil)	Leonardo Santos	Lightweight
(United States)	Liz Carmouche	Women's Bantamweight
(United States)	Lorenz Larkin	Middleweight
(Brazil)	Lucas Martins	Featherweight
(England)	Luke Barnatt	Middleweight
(United States)	Luke Rockhold	Middleweight
(Brazil)	Michel Prazeres	Lightweight
(United States)	Miesha Tate	Women's Bantamweight

ISO	Fighter	Division
(Japan)	Mizuto Hirota	Featherweight
(United States)	Nah-Shon Burrell	Welterweight
(Austria)	Nandor Guelmino	Heavyweight
(United States)	Neil Magny	Welterweight
(Sweden)	Nico Musoke	Welterweight
(Ukraine)	Nikita Krylov	Light Heavyweight
(Russia)	Omari Akhmedov	Welterweight
(United States)	Ovince St. Preux	Light Heavyweight
(Brazil)	Pedro Nobre	Flyweight
(United States)	Peggy Morgan	Women's Featherweight
(Poland)	Piotr Hallmann	Lightweight
(United States)	Quinn Mulhern	Welterweight
(Brazil)	Rafael Cavalcante	Light Heavyweight
(United States)	Raquel Pennington	Women's Bantamweight
(Australia)	Richie Vaculik	Flyweight
(Scotland)	Robert Whiteford	Featherweight
(United States)	Roger Bowling	Lightweight
(Brazil)	Roger Gracie	Middleweight
(Canada)	Roger Hollett	Light Heavyweight
(Brazil)	Ronaldo Souza	Middleweight
(United States)	Ronda Rousey	Women's Bantamweight
(England)	Rosi Sexton	Women's Flyweight
(United States)	Roxanne Modafferi	Women's Flyweight
(United States)	Ryan Benoit	Flyweight
(United States)	Ryan Couture	Lightweight
(United States)	Ryan LaFlare	Welterweight
(Argentina)	Santiago Ponzinibbio	Welterweight
(United States)	Sara McMann	Women's Bantamweight
(Canada)	Sarah Kaufman	Women's Bantamweight
(United States)	Sean Spencer	Welterweight
(United States)	Sergio Pettis	Flyweight
(Germany)	Sheila Gaff	Women's Bantamweight
(Brazil)	Thiago Santos	Middleweight
(United States)	Tim Kennedy	Middleweight
(Finland)	Tom Niinimäki	Featherweight
(Sweden)	Tor Troéng	Middleweight
(United States)	Trevor Smith	Middleweight
(United States)	Tyron Woodley	Welterweight
(United States)	Uriah Hall	Middleweight
(Brazil)	Viscardi Andrade	Welterweight
(United States)	Walt Harris	Heavyweight
(Brazil)	William Macário	Welterweight
(Brazil)	Wilson Reis	Flyweight
(Brazil)	Yan Cabral	Lightweight
(United States)	Yancy Medeiros	Lightweight
(Cuba)	Yoel Romero	Middleweight
(Brazil)	Yuri Villefort	Welterweight
(United States)	Zach Makovsky	Flyweight
(United States)	Zak Cummings	Middleweight

== The Ultimate Fighter ==
Season	Finale	Division	Winner	Runner-up
TUF 17: Team Jones vs. Team Sonnen	Apr 13, 2013	Middleweight	Kelvin Gastelum	Uriah Hall
TUF: Brazil 2	Jun 8, 2013	Welterweight	Leonardo Santos	William Macario
TUF 18: Team Rousey vs. Team Tate	Nov 30, 2013	Bantamweight	Chris Holdsworth	David Grant
TUF 18: Team Rousey vs. Team Tate	Nov 30, 2013	Women's Bantamweight	Julianna Peña	Jessica Rakoczy
TUF: China	Nov 30, 2013	Featherweight	Ning Guangyou	Yang Jianping
TUF: China	Nov 30, 2013	Welterweight	Zhang Lipeng	Wang Sai

== Title fights ==
Title fights in 2013
Weight class				Method	Round	Time	Event	Notes
Flyweight	Demetrious Johnson (c)	def.	John Dodson	Decision (unanimous) (49–46, 48–47, 48–47)	5	5:00	UFC on Fox 6	(Note: For the UFC Flyweight Championship.)
Featherweight	José Aldo (c)	def.	Frankie Edgar	Decision (unanimous) (49–46, 49–46, 48–47)	5	5:00	UFC 156	(Note: For the UFC Featherweight Championship.)
Bantamweight	Renan Barão (ic)	def.	Michael McDonald	Submission (arm-triangle choke)	4	3:57	UFC on Fuel TV 7	(Note: For the interim UFC Bantamweight Championship.)
Women's Bantamweight	Ronda Rousey (c)	def.	Liz Carmouche	Submission (armbar)	1	4:49	UFC 157	(Note: For the UFC Women's Bantamweight Championship.)
Welterweight	Georges St-Pierre (c)	def.	Nick Diaz	Decision (unanimous) (50–45, 50–45, 50–45)	5	5:00	UFC 158	(Note: For the UFC Welterweight Championship.)
Lightweight	Benson Henderson (c)	def.	Gilbert Melendez	Decision (split) (47–48, 48–47, 48–47)	5	5:00	UFC on Fox 7	(Note: For the UFC Lightweight Championship.)
Light Heavyweight	Jon Jones (c)	def.	Chael Sonnen	TKO (elbows and punches)	1	4:33	UFC 159	(Note: For the UFC Light Heavyweight Championship.)
Heavyweight	Cain Velasquez (c)	def.	Antônio Silva	TKO (punches)	1	1:21	UFC 160	(Note: For the UFC Heavyweight Championship.)
Middleweight	Chris Weidman	def.	Anderson Silva (c)	KO (punches)	2	1:18	UFC 162	(Note: For the UFC Middleweight Championship.)
Flyweight	Demetrious Johnson (c)	def.	John Moraga	Submission (armbar)	5	3:43	UFC on Fox 8	(Note: For the UFC Flyweight Championship.)
Featherweight	José Aldo (c)	def.	Chan Sung Jung	TKO (punches)	4	2:00	UFC 163	(Note: For the UFC Featherweight Championship.)
Lightweight	Anthony Pettis	def.	Benson Henderson (c)	Submission (armbar)	1	4:31	UFC 164	(Note: For the UFC Lightweight Championship.)
Bantamweight	Renan Barão (ic)	def.	Eddie Wineland	TKO (spinning back kick and punches)	2	0:26	UFC 165	(Note: For the interim UFC Bantamweight Championship.)
Light Heavyweight	Jon Jones (c)	def.	Alexander Gustafsson	Decision (unanimous) (48–47, 48–47, 49–46)	5	5:00	UFC 165	(Note: For the UFC Light Heavyweight Championship.)
Heavyweight	Cain Velasquez (c)	def.	Junior dos Santos	TKO (slam and punch)	5	3:09	UFC 166	(Note: For the UFC Heavyweight Championship.)
Welterweight	Georges St-Pierre (c)	def.	Johny Hendricks	Decision (split) (48–47, 47–48, 48–47)	5	5:00	UFC 167	(Note: For the UFC Welterweight Championship.)
Flyweight	Demetrious Johnson (c)	def.	Joseph Benavidez	KO (punches)	1	2:08	UFC on Fox 9	(Note: For the UFC Flyweight Championship.)
Women's Bantamweight	Ronda Rousey (c)	def.	Miesha Tate	Submission (armbar)	3	0:58	UFC 168	(Note: For the UFC Women's Bantamweight Championship.)
Middleweight	Chris Weidman (c)	def.	Anderson Silva	TKO (leg injury)	2	1:16	UFC 168	(Note: For the UFC Middleweight Championship.)

== Events list ==
#	Event	Date	Venue	Location	Attendance
257	UFC 168: Weidman vs. Silva 2	Dec 28, 2013	MGM Grand Garden Arena	Las Vegas, Nevada, U.S.	15,650
256	UFC on Fox: Johnson vs. Benavidez 2	Dec 14, 2013	Sleep Train Arena	Sacramento, California, U.S.	11,573
255	UFC Fight Night: Hunt vs. Bigfoot	Dec 7, 2013	Brisbane Entertainment Centre	Brisbane, Australia	11,393
254	The Ultimate Fighter: Team Rousey vs. Team Tate Finale	Nov 30, 2013	Mandalay Bay Events Center	Las Vegas, Nevada, U.S.	4,853
253	UFC 167: St-Pierre vs. Hendricks	Nov 16, 2013	MGM Grand Garden Arena	Las Vegas, Nevada, U.S.	14,856
252	UFC Fight Night: Belfort vs. Henderson	Nov 9, 2013	Goiânia Arena	Goiânia, Brazil	10,565
251	UFC: Fight for the Troops 3	Nov 6, 2013	Fort Campbell	Fort Campbell, Kentucky, U.S.	—N/a
250	UFC Fight Night: Machida vs. Munoz	Oct 26, 2013	Phones 4u Arena	Manchester, England, U.K.	10,355
249	UFC 166: Velasquez vs. Dos Santos 3	Oct 19, 2013	Toyota Center	Houston, Texas, U.S.	17,238
248	UFC Fight Night: Maia vs. Shields	Oct 9, 2013	Ginásio José Corrêa	Barueri, Brazil	6,621
247	UFC 165: Jones vs. Gustafsson	Sep 21, 2013	Air Canada Centre	Toronto, Ontario, Canada	15,504
246	UFC Fight Night: Teixeira vs. Bader	Sep 4, 2013	Mineirinho Arena	Belo Horizonte, Brazil	5,126
245	UFC 164: Henderson vs. Pettis	Aug 31, 2013	BMO Harris Bradley Center	Milwaukee, Wisconsin, U.S.	9,178
244	UFC Fight Night: Condit vs. Kampmann 2	Aug 28, 2013	Bankers Life Fieldhouse	Indianapolis, Indiana, U.S.	6,417
243	UFC Fight Night: Shogun vs. Sonnen	Aug 17, 2013	TD Garden	Boston, Massachusetts, U.S.	14,181
242	UFC 163: Aldo vs. Korean Zombie	Aug 3, 2013	HSBC Arena	Rio de Janeiro, Brazil	13,873
241	UFC on Fox: Johnson vs. Moraga	Jul 27, 2013	KeyArena	Seattle, Washington, U.S.	8,967
240	UFC 162: Silva vs. Weidman	Jul 6, 2013	MGM Grand Garden Arena	Las Vegas, Nevada, U.S.	12,964
239	UFC 161: Evans vs. Henderson	Jun 15, 2013	MTS Centre	Winnipeg, Manitoba, Canada	14,754
238	UFC on Fuel TV: Nogueira vs. Werdum	Jun 8, 2013	Ginásio Paulo Sarasate	Fortaleza, Brazil	6,286
237	UFC 160: Velasquez vs. Bigfoot 2	May 25, 2013	MGM Grand Garden Arena	Las Vegas, Nevada, U.S.	12,380
236	UFC on FX: Belfort vs. Rockhold	May 18, 2013	Arena Jaraguá	Jaraguá do Sul, Brazil	7,642
235	UFC 159: Jones vs. Sonnen	Apr 27, 2013	Prudential Center	Newark, New Jersey, U.S.	15,227
234	UFC on Fox: Henderson vs. Melendez	Apr 20, 2013	HP Pavilion	San Jose, California, U.S.	13,506
233	The Ultimate Fighter: Team Jones vs. Team Sonnen Finale	Apr 13, 2013	Mandalay Bay Events Center	Las Vegas, Nevada, U.S.	5,918
232	UFC on Fuel TV: Mousasi vs. Latifi	Apr 6, 2013	Ericsson Globe Arena	Stockholm, Sweden	14,506
231	UFC 158: St-Pierre vs. Diaz	Mar 16, 2013	Bell Centre	Montreal, Quebec, Canada	20,145
230	UFC on Fuel TV: Silva vs. Stann	Mar 3, 2013	Saitama Super Arena	Saitama, Japan	14,682
229	UFC 157: Rousey vs. Carmouche	Feb 23, 2013	Honda Center	Anaheim, California, U.S.	13,257
228	UFC on Fuel TV: Barão vs. McDonald	Feb 16, 2013	Wembley Arena	London, England, U.K.	10,349
227	UFC 156: Aldo vs. Edgar	Feb 2, 2013	Mandalay Bay Events Center	Las Vegas, Nevada, U.S.	10,275
226	UFC on Fox: Johnson vs. Dodson	Jan 26, 2013	United Center	Chicago, Illinois, U.S.	16,091
225	UFC on FX: Belfort vs. Bisping	Jan 19, 2013	Ginásio do Ibirapuera	São Paulo, Brazil	9,116

== UFC on FX: Belfort vs. Bisping ==
UFC on FX: Belfort vs. Bisping
- The poster for UFC on FX: Belfort vs. Bisping
- Promotion: Ultimate Fighting Championship
- Date: January 19, 2013
- Venue: Ginásio do Ibirapuera
- City: São Paulo, Brazil
- Attendance: 9,116

Event chronology
UFC 155: dos Santos vs. Velasquez 2	UFC on FX: Belfort vs. Bisping	UFC on Fox: Johnson vs. Dodson

UFC on FX: Belfort vs. Bisping (also known as UFC on FX 7) was a mixed martial arts event held by the Ultimate Fighting Championship on January 19, 2013, at Ginásio do Ibirapuera in São Paulo, Brazil.

=== Background ===
The main fight featured middleweights Michael Bisping and Vitor Belfort. The event also held the first UFC fight for Daniel Sarafian, middleweight finalist on the first season of The Ultimate Fighter: Brazil. Sarafian was injured before the championship fight with Cezar Ferreira, who went on to win the show.

Johnny Eduardo was briefly linked to a bout at this event against Iuri Alcântara, but was replaced by George Roop. Roop was then injured and replaced by UFC newcomer Pedro Nobre.

Thiago Perpetuo was expected to face Michael Kuiper at the event; however, Perpetuo suffered an injury and was replaced by Caio Magalhaes. On December 27, it was announced that Magalhaes had also pulled out of the bout and that Kuiper would be shifted to UFC on Fox 6 on January 26, 2013 to face Buddy Roberts.

Roger Hollett was expected to face Wagner Prado at the event; however, Hollett was forced out of the bout with a torn bicep and was replaced by promotional newcomer Ildemar Alcântara.

=== Results ===
Main Card (FX)
Weight class				Method	Round	Time	Notes
Middleweight	Vitor Belfort	def.	Michael Bisping	TKO (head kick and punches)	2	1:27
Middleweight	C. B. Dollaway	def.	Daniel Sarafian	Decision (split) (29–28, 28–29, 29–28)	3	5:00
Heavyweight	Gabriel Gonzaga	def.	Ben Rothwell	Submission (guillotine choke)	2	1:01
Lightweight	Khabib Nurmagomedov	def.	Thiago Tavares	KO (punches and elbows)	1	1:55
Preliminary Card (Fuel TV)
Featherweight	Godofredo Pepey	def.	Milton Vieira	Decision (split) (28–29, 29–28, 29–28)	3	5:00
Middleweight	Ronny Markes	def.	Andrew Craig	Decision (unanimous) (29–28, 29–28, 29–28)	3	5:00
Featherweight	Nik Lentz	def.	Diego Nunes	Decision (unanimous) (30–28, 30–27, 30–26)	3	5:00
Lightweight	Edson Barboza	def.	Lucas Martins	TKO (punches)	1	2:38	(Note: This bout aired on the broadcast following the Belfort vs Bisping bout.)
Bantamweight	Pedro Nobre	vs.	Iuri Alcântara	No Contest	1	2:11	(Note: Nobre was unable to continue due to Alcântara landing strikes to the back of Nobre's head.)
Light Heavyweight	Ildemar Alcântara	def.	Wagner Prado	Submission (knee lock)	2	2:39
Preliminary Card (Facebook)
Lightweight	Francisco Trinaldo	def.	C.J. Keith	Submission (arm-triangle choke)	2	1:50

=== Bonus awards ===
The following fighters received $50,000 bonuses.

- Fight of the Night: C.B. Dollaway vs. Daniel Sarafian
- Knockout of the Night: Vitor Belfort
- Submission of the Night: Ildemar Alcântara

== UFC on Fox: Henderson vs. Melendez ==
UFC on Fox: Henderson vs. Melendez
- The poster for UFC on Fox: Henderson vs. Melendez
- Promotion: Ultimate Fighting Championship
- Date: April 20, 2013
- Venue: HP Pavilion
- City: San Jose, California
- Attendance: 13,506
- Total gate: $1.333 million

Event chronology
The Ultimate Fighter: Team Jones vs. Team Sonnen Finale	UFC on Fox: Henderson vs. Melendez	UFC 159: Jones vs. Sonnen

UFC on Fox: Henderson vs. Melendez (also known as UFC on Fox 7) was a mixed martial arts event held on April 20, 2013, at the HP Pavilion in San Jose, California. The event was broadcast live on FOX.

=== Background ===
The event was headlined by a UFC Lightweight Championship bout between defending champion Benson Henderson and Strikeforce Lightweight Champion Gilbert Melendez. Also featured on the card was a bout between two time UFC Heavyweight Champion Frank Mir and Strikeforce Heavyweight Grand Prix Champion Daniel Cormier.

Clay Guida was expected to face Chad Mendes at this event. However it was revealed on March 15 that Guida had pulled out of the bout citing an injury and was replaced by Darren Elkins.

Dan Hardy was expected to face Matt Brown at the event. However, Hardy was forced out of the bout due to medical issues regarding his heart and was replaced by Jordan Mein.

Francisco Rivera was expected to face Hugo Viana at the event. However, Rivera was forced out of the bout with an injury and replaced by T.J. Dillashaw.

A scheduled bout between Jon Tuck and Norman Parke was scrapped during the week leading up to the event, as Tuck was forced out of the bout with an injury.

=== Results ===
Main card (Fox)
Weight class				Method	Round	Time	Notes
Lightweight	Benson Henderson (c)	def.	Gilbert Melendez	Decision (split) (47–48, 48–47, 48–47)	5	5:00	(Note: For the UFC Lightweight Championship.)
Heavyweight	Daniel Cormier	def.	Frank Mir	Decision (unanimous) (30–27, 30–27, 30–27)	3	5:00
Lightweight	Josh Thomson	def.	Nate Diaz	TKO (head kick and punches)	2	3:44
Welterweight	Matt Brown	def.	Jordan Mein	TKO (elbows to the body)	2	1:00
Preliminary Card (FX)
Featherweight	Chad Mendes	def.	Darren Elkins	TKO (punches)	1	1:08
Middleweight	Francis Carmont	def.	Lorenz Larkin	Decision (unanimous) (29–28, 29–28, 29–28)	3	5:00
Lightweight	Myles Jury	def.	Ramsey Nijem	KO (punch)	2	1:02
Flyweight	Joseph Benavidez	def.	Darren Uyenoyama	TKO (body kick and punches)	2	4:50
Lightweight	Jorge Masvidal	def.	Tim Means	Decision (unanimous) (29–28, 29–28, 29–28)	3	5:00
Bantamweight	T.J. Dillashaw	def.	Hugo Viana	TKO (punches)	1	4:22
Preliminary card (Facebook)
Lightweight	Anthony Njokuani	def.	Roger Bowling	TKO (punch)	2	2:52
Middleweight	Yoel Romero	def.	Clifford Starks	KO (flying knee and punches)	1	1:32

=== Bonus Awards ===
Fighters were awarded $50,000 bonuses.

- Fight of the Night: Matt Brown vs. Jordan Mein
- Knockout of the Night: Josh Thomson and Yoel Romero
- Submission of the Night: None

=== Reported payout ===
The following is the reported payout to the fighters as reported to the California State Athletic Commission. It does not include sponsor money and also does not include the UFC's traditional "fight night" bonuses or Pay-Per-View quotas.

- Benson Henderson: $200,000 (includes $100,000 win bonus) def. Gilbert Melendez: $175,000
- Daniel Cormier: $126,000 (includes $63,000 win bonus) def. Frank Mir: $200,000
- Josh Thomson: $95,000 (includes $10,000 win bonus) def. Nate Diaz: $15,000
- Matt Brown: $60,000 (includes $30,000 win bonus) def. Jordan Mein: $16,000
- Chad Mendes: $56,000 (includes $28,000 win bonus) def. Darren Elkins: $24,000
- Francis Carmont: $38,000 (includes $19,000 win bonus) def. Lorenz Larkin: $23,000
- Myles Jury: $16,000 (includes $8,000 win bonus) def. Ramsey Nijem: $14,000
- Joseph Benavidez: $66,000 (includes $33,000 win bonus) def. Darren Uyenoyama: $12,000
- Jorge Masvidal: $60,000 (includes $30,000 win bonus) def. Tim Means: $10,000
- T.J. Dillashaw: $28,000 (includes $14,000 win bonus) def. Hugo Viana: $8,000
- Anthony Njokuani: $36,000 (includes $18,000 win bonus) def. Roger Bowling: $12,000
- Yoel Romero: $20,000 (includes $10,000 win bonus) def. Clifford Starks: $8,000

== See also ==
- UFC
- List of UFC champions
- List of UFC events
