= UFC Fight Night: Nogueira vs. Nelson =

UFC mixed martial arts event in 2014

- The poster for UFC Fight Night: Nogueira vs. Nelson
- Promotion: Ultimate Fighting Championship
- Date: April 11, 2014
- Venue: du Arena
- City: Abu Dhabi, United Arab Emirates
- Attendance: 7,963
- Total gate: $1,800,000

Event chronology
UFC Fight Night: Shogun vs. Henderson 2	UFC Fight Night: Nogueira vs. Nelson	The Ultimate Fighter Nations Finale: Bisping vs. Kennedy

UFC Fight Night: Nogueira vs. Nelson (also known as UFC Fight Night 39) was a mixed martial arts event held on April 11, 2014, at du Arena in Abu Dhabi, United Arab Emirates.

== Background ==
A heavyweight bout between Roy Nelson and Antônio Rodrigo Nogueira headlined this event.

The event was the second that the organization hosted in Abu Dhabi, after UFC 112 in 2010. The event was also the first UFC and MMA event held at the du Arena.

A flyweight bout between Alptekin Özkiliç and Dustin Ortiz was expected to take place on this card. However, on April 3, the fight was cancelled due to injury to Özkiliç.

A middleweight bout between Chris Camozzi and Andrew Craig was expected to take place on this card, however the fight was cancelled on the day of the weigh-ins as Craig was ruled out with an illness. Despite the cancellation, the UFC announced that both fighters would receive their show money for the bout.

== Results ==
Fight card (UFC Fight Pass)
Weight class				Method	Round	Time	Notes
Heavyweight	Roy Nelson	def.	Antônio Rodrigo Nogueira	KO (punch)	1	3:37
Featherweight	Clay Guida	def.	Tatsuya Kawajiri	Decision (unanimous) (30–27, 30–27, 30–27)	3	5:00
Welterweight	Ryan LaFlare	def.	John Howard	Decision (unanimous) (29–28, 29–28, 29–28)	3	5:00
Lightweight	Ramsey Nijem	def.	Beneil Dariush	TKO (punches)	1	4:20
Preliminary card (UFC Fight Pass)
Heavyweight	Jared Rosholt	def.	Daniel Omielańczuk	Decision (unanimous) (30–27, 30–26, 30–27)	3	5:00
Middleweight	Thales Leites	def.	Trevor Smith	TKO (punches)	1	0:45
Featherweight	Jim Alers	def.	Alan Omer	Decision (split) (29–28, 28–29, 29–28)	3	5:00
Bantamweight	Rani Yahya	vs.	Johnny Bedford	No Contest (accidental headbutt)	1	0:39	(Note: Bout ruled a No Contest as an accidental clash of heads rendered Yahya unable to protect himself.)

== Bonus awards ==
The following fighters received $50,000 bonuses:

- Fight of the Night: Clay Guida vs. Tatsuya Kawajiri
- Performance of the Night: Roy Nelson and Ramsey Nijem

== See also ==
- List of UFC events
- 2014 in UFC
