= Honolulu Community College =

Community college in Honolulu, Hawaiʻi, U.S.

- Logo of Honolulu Community College
- Type: Public community college
- Established: 1920; 106 years ago
- Parent institution: University of Hawaiʻi System
- Accreditation: ACCJC
- Academic affiliations: Space-grant
- Chancellor: Karen Lee
- Students: 4000+
- Location: Honolulu, Hawaiʻi, United States; 21°19′17″N 157°52′12″W
- Campus: Urban
- Website: honolulu.hawaii.edu

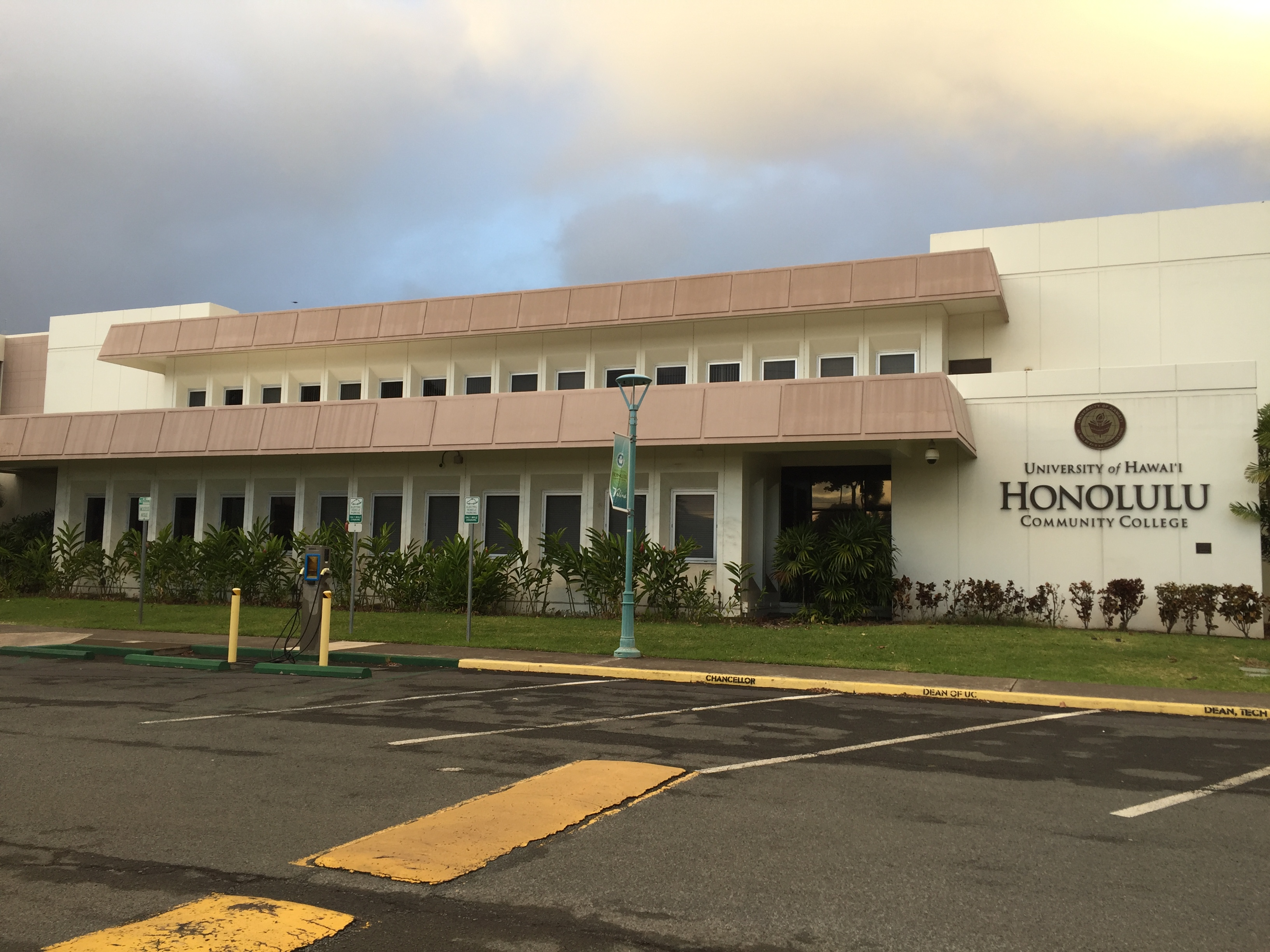
Honolulu Community College

Honolulu Community College is a public community college in Honolulu, Hawaiʻi. It is one of ten branches of the University of Hawaiʻi System and is accredited by the Accrediting Commission for Community and Junior Colleges.

HCC's strengths are in its industrial programs including such items as automotive and aircraft maintenance. The Marine Education and Training Center trains candidates for marine programs.

== Notable alumni ==
- Dustin Kimura, Welding Technology; professional mixed martial artist for the Ultimate Fighting Championship
