= UFC 175 =

UFC mixed martial arts event in 2014

UFC 175: Weidman vs. Machida
- The poster for UFC 175: Weidman vs. Machida
- Promotion: Ultimate Fighting Championship
- Date: July 5, 2014
- Venue: Mandalay Bay Events Center
- City: Las Vegas, Nevada
- Attendance: 10,988
- Total gate: $4,400,000
- Buyrate: 545,000

Event chronology
UFC Fight Night: Swanson vs. Stephens	UFC 175: Weidman vs. Machida	The Ultimate Fighter 19 Finale

UFC 175: Weidman vs. Machida was a mixed martial arts event held on July 5, 2014, at Mandalay Bay Events Center in Las Vegas, Nevada.

== Background ==
The event was headlined by a Middleweight Championship bout between the current champion Chris Weidman and former UFC Light Heavyweight Champion Lyoto Machida. The bout was originally scheduled to headline UFC 173 on May 24, 2014. However, the bout was delayed after Weidman sustained a knee injury which required a minor surgery.

A light heavyweight bout between the coaches of The Ultimate Fighter: Brazil 3 Chael Sonnen and Wanderlei Silva was originally scheduled for UFC 173. However, the fight was moved twice - first being on May 31, 2014 at The Ultimate Fighter: Brazil 3 Finale, and now was expected to be contested on this card. Silva was ultimately pulled from the fight entirely after he failed to submit an application to fight in the state of Nevada, as well as his refusal to undergo a random drug test and was replaced by Vitor Belfort. The bout between Sonnen and Belfort was to be contested at middleweight. However, Sonnen subsequently failed his random drug test and was removed from the bout and ultimately retired from the sport. The following day it was announced by MMA writer Kevin Iole that Belfort had also been removed from the card due to the inability of the UFC finding him a new opponent.

A bout between Dan Henderson and Daniel Cormier was briefly linked to this event but was moved up to UFC 173 to bolster that event's card.

Santiago Ponzinibbio was expected to face Ildemar Alcântara but was forced out of the bout with a knee injury. He was replaced by Kenny Robertson.

During the event, Stefan Struve suffered a "near-fainting episode" and his bout with Matt Mitrione on the pay-per-view was canceled. The first fight of the main card was already happening when the news was revealed on Twitter and it was officially confirmed on the broadcast after the Brimage-Doane fight ended.

== Results ==
Main card
Weight class				Method	Round	Time	Notes
Middleweight	Chris Weidman (c)	def.	Lyoto Machida	Decision (unanimous) (49–45, 48–47, 49–46)	5	5:00	(Note: For the UFC Middleweight Championship.)
Women's Bantamweight	Ronda Rousey (c)	def.	Alexis Davis	KO (punches)	1	0:16	(Note: For the UFC Women's Bantamweight Championship.)
Middleweight	Uriah Hall	def.	Thiago Santos	Decision (unanimous) (29–28, 29–28, 29–28)	3	5:00
Bantamweight	Russell Doane	def.	Marcus Brimage	Decision (split) (29–28, 28–29, 30–27)	3	5:00
Preliminary card (Fox Sports 1)
Bantamweight	Urijah Faber	def.	Alex Caceres	Submission (rear-naked choke)	3	1:09
Welterweight	Kenny Robertson	def.	Ildemar Alcântara	Decision (unanimous) (30–26, 30–26, 30–26)	3	5:00
Middleweight	Bruno Santos	def.	Chris Camozzi	Decision (split) (29–28, 28–29, 29–28)	3	5:00
Bantamweight	Rob Font	def.	George Roop	KO (punch)	1	2:19	(Note: This bout aired on the broadcast following the Hall vs Santos bout.)
Preliminary card (UFC Fight Pass)
Middleweight	Luke Zachrich	def.	Guilherme Vasconcelos	Decision (unanimous) (30–27, 30–27, 29–28)	3	5:00
Middleweight	Kevin Casey	vs.	Bubba Bush	No Contest (overturned)	1	1:01	(Note: Originally a KO (elbows) victory for Casey, the result was changed to "No Contest" after Casey tested positive for drostanolone during a post fight screening.)

== Bonus awards ==
The following fighters received $50,000 bonuses:

- Fight of the Night: Chris Weidman vs. Lyoto Machida
- Performance of the Night: Ronda Rousey and Rob Font

== Reported payout ==
The following is the reported payout to the fighters as reported to the Nevada State Athletic Commission. It does not include sponsor money and also does not include the UFC's traditional "fight night" bonuses.

- Chris Weidman: $450,000 (includes $225,000 win bonus) def. Lyoto Machida: $200,000
- Ronda Rousey: $120,000 (includes $60,000 win bonus) def. Alexis Davis: $24,000
- Stefan Struve: $80,000 (includes $40,000 win bonus) vs. Matt Mitrione: $60,000 (includes $30,000 win bonus) ^
- Uriah Hall: $20,000 (includes $10,000 win bonus) def. Thiago Santos: $10,000
- Russell Doane: $18,000 (includes $9,000 win bonus) def. Marcus Brimage: $10,000
- Urijah Faber: $120,000 (includes $60,000 win bonus) def. Alex Caceres: $19,000
- Kenny Robertson: $28,000 (includes $14,000 win bonus) def. Ildemar Alcântara: $16,000
- Bruno Santos: $16,000 (includes $8,000 win bonus) def. Chris Camozzi: $23,000
- Rob Font: $16,000 (includes $8,000 win bonus) def. George Roop: $20,000
- Luke Zachrich: $16,000 (includes $8,000 win bonus) def. Guilherme Vasconcelos: $8,000
- Kevin Casey: $16,000 (includes $8,000 win bonus) def. Bubba Bush: $8,000

^ Fight didn't take place because of pre-fight "near-fainting episode" suffered by Struve; Although not reflected in the NSAC paperwork, both fighters still paid show/win bonuses

== See also ==
- List of UFC events
- 2014 in UFC
