= UFC 156 =

UFC mixed martial arts event in 2013

UFC 156: Aldo vs. Edgar
- The poster for UFC 156: Aldo vs. Edgar
- Promotion: Ultimate Fighting Championship
- Date: February 2, 2013
- Venue: Mandalay Bay Events Center
- City: Paradise, Nevada
- Attendance: 10,875
- Total gate: $2,437,150
- Buyrate: 330,000

Event chronology
UFC on Fox: Johnson vs. Dodson	UFC 156: Aldo vs. Edgar	UFC on Fuel TV: Barão vs. McDonald

UFC 156: Aldo vs. Edgar was a mixed martial arts event held by the Ultimate Fighting Championship on February 2, 2013, at the Mandalay Bay Events Center in Paradise, Nevada.

== Background ==
A bout between Dan Henderson and Lyoto Machida was briefly linked to this event, but was eventually moved to UFC 157 to bolster that event's card.

Erick Silva was expected to face Jay Hieron at this event; however, Silva pulled out of the bout citing an injury, and was replaced by promotional newcomer Tyron Woodley.

A date between Robbie Peralta and Akira Corassani was briefly linked to this event; however the bout was rescheduled for April 6, 2013 at UFC on Fuel TV 9 after Corassani was sidelined for a short period with an illness.

At the weigh-ins, promotional newcomer Dustin Kimura came in heavy weighing in at 139 lb. Kimura was given two hours to cut to the bantamweight maximum of 136 pounds, but he elected instead to surrender a percentage of his fight purse to his opponent Chico Camus.

== Results ==
Main Card
Weight class				Method	Round	Time	Notes
Featherweight	José Aldo (c)	def.	Frankie Edgar	Decision (unanimous) (49–46, 49–46, 48–47)	5	5:00	(Note: For the UFC Featherweight Championship.)
Light Heavyweight	Antônio Rogério Nogueira	def.	Rashad Evans	Decision (unanimous) (29–28, 29–28, 29–28)	3	5:00
Heavyweight	Antônio Silva	def.	Alistair Overeem	KO (punches)	3	0:25
Welterweight	Demian Maia	def.	Jon Fitch	Decision (unanimous) (30–27, 30–27, 30–27)	3	5:00
Flyweight	Joseph Benavidez	def.	Ian McCall	Decision (unanimous) (29–28, 29–28, 29–28)	3	5:00
Preliminary Card (FX)
Lightweight	Evan Dunham	def.	Gleison Tibau	Decision (split) (29–28, 28–29, 29–28)	3	5:00
Welterweight	Tyron Woodley	def.	Jay Hieron	KO (punches)	1	0:36
Lightweight	Bobby Green	def.	Jacob Volkmann	Submission (rear-naked choke)	3	4:25
Lightweight	Isaac Vallie-Flagg	def.	Yves Edwards	Decision (split) (29–28, 28–29, 29–28)	3	5:00
Preliminary Card (Facebook)
Catchweight (139.5 lb)	Dustin Kimura	def.	Chico Camus	Submission (rear-naked choke)	3	1:50
Bantamweight	Francisco Rivera	def.	Edwin Figueroa	TKO (punches)	2	4:20

== Bonus awards ==
Fighters were awarded $50,000 bonuses.

- Fight of the Night: José Aldo vs. Frankie Edgar
- Knockout of the Night: Antônio Silva
- Submission of the Night: Bobby Green

== Reported payout ==
The following is the reported payout to the fighters as reported to the Nevada State Athletic Commission. It does not include sponsor money and also does not include the UFC's traditional "fight night" bonuses or Pay-Per-View quotas.

- José Aldo: $240,000 (includes $120,000 win bonus) def. Frankie Edgar: $120,000
- Antônio Rogério Nogueira: $174,000 (includes $67,000 win bonus) def. Rashad Evans: $300,000
- Antônio Silva: $70,000 (no win bonus) def. Alistair Overeem: $285,714
- Demian Maia: $120,000 (includes $60,000 win bonus) def. Jon Fitch: $66,000
- Joseph Benavidez: $60,000 (includes $30,000 win bonus) def. Ian McCall: $9,000
- Evan Dunham: $46,000 (includes $23,000 win bonus) def. Gleison Tibau: $33,000
- Tyron Woodley: $87,000 (includes $43,500 win bonus) def. Jay Hieron: $12,000
- Bobby Green: $20,000 (includes $10,000 win bonus) def. Jacob Volkmann: $22,000
- Isaac Vallie-Flagg: $20,000 (includes $10,000 win bonus) def. Yves Edwards: $21,000
- Dustin Kimura: $16,000 (includes $8,000 win bonus) def. Chico Camus: $8,000 ^
- Francisco Rivera: $16,000 (includes $8,000 win bonus) def. Edwin Figueroa: $10,000

^ Dustin Kimura was reportedly fined 20 percent of his purse for failing to make the required weight for his fight. The Nevada State Athletic Commission's initial report did not include information on the penalty.

== See also ==
- List of UFC events
- 2013 in UFC
