= Chico Camus =

American mixed martial arts fighter

- Born: January 26, 1985 (age 41); Milwaukee, Wisconsin, United States
- Other names: King
- Height: 5 ft 6 in (1.68 m)
- Weight: 135 lb (61 kg; 9.6 st)
- Division: Flyweight; Bantamweight; Featherweight
- Reach: 66 in (168 cm)
- Fighting out of: Milwaukee, Wisconsin, United States
- Team: Roufusport (2007–2014)
- Years active: 2009–present

Mixed martial arts record
- Total: 27
- Wins: 18
- By knockout: 4
- By submission: 3
- By decision: 11
- Losses: 8
- By knockout: 1
- By submission: 1
- By decision: 6
- No contests: 1

Other information
- Mixed martial arts record from Sherdog

Chico Camus (born January 26, 1985) is an American mixed martial artist currently competing in the Bantamweight division of the Legacy Fighting Alliance. A professional competitor since 2009, he has also formerly competed for the UFC, Legacy FC, and the RFA.

== Background ==
Camus had a troubled childhood and juvenility, belonging to a gang and using drugs. In 2007, he started training mixed martial arts with Anthony Pettis at his native Roufusport.

== Mixed martial arts ==
=== Early career ===
Camus started his professional career in 2009, fighting mainly for organizations in his home state.

In 2010 for NAFC, he defeated Joe Pearson and John Hosman via TKO and lost to Jameel Massouh by unanimous decision.

=== Legends of Fighting Championship ===
Camus fought in LFC bantamweight tournament for a contract with Tachi Palace Fights. He defeated Daniel Aguirre in the quarterfinals and Alptekin Özkiliç in the semifinals, but did not compete in the finals due to signing with the UFC.

=== Ultimate Fighting Championship ===
Camus faced Dustin Pague on August 11, 2012, at UFC 150. He won the fight via unanimous decision (29–28, 30–27, 29–28).

Camus faced promotional newcomer Dustin Kimura on February 2, 2013, at UFC 156. He lost the fight via submission in the third round.

Camus faced Kyung Ho Kang on August 31, 2013, at UFC 164. He won the fight via unanimous decision (29–28, 29–28, 30–27).

Camus faced Yaotzin Meza on January 25, 2014, at UFC on Fox 10. Originally, he won the fight via unanimous decision (30–27, 29–28, 29–28) but the result was overturned after Camus failed a post fight drug test.

Camus faced Chris Holdsworth on May 24, 2014, at UFC 173, replacing Kyung Ho Kang. He lost the fight via unanimous decision.

Camus faced Brad Pickett in a flyweight bout on November 22, 2014, at UFC Fight Night 57. He won the back-and-forth fight via split decision.

Camus faced Henry Cejudo on June 13, 2015, at UFC 188. He lost the fight by unanimous decision.

Camus faced Kyoji Horiguchi at UFC Fight Night 75 on September 27, 2015. He lost the fight by unanimous decision and was subsequently released from the promotion.

== Personal life ==
Camus has four children: Armani, Isaiah and twins Amara and Noah.

== Championships and accomplishments ==
=== Mixed martial arts ===
- Legends of Fighting Championship
  - LFC Bantamweight Tournament Finalist (2012)
- Gladiators Cage Fighting
  - GCF Bantamweight Championship (One time)

== Mixed martial arts record ==
Professional record breakdown
| 27 matches | 18 wins | 8 losses |
| By knockout | 4 | 1 |
| By submission | 3 | 1 |
| By decision | 11 | 6 |
| No contests | 1 | |

| Res. | Record | Opponent | Method | Event | Date | Round | Time | Location | Notes |
|---|---|---|---|---|---|---|---|---|---|
| Loss | 18–8 (1) | Ricky Simón | Decision (unanimous) | LFA 29 | December 15, 2017 | 3 | 5:00 | Prior Lake, Minnesota, United States | For the vacant LFA Bantamweight Championship. |
| Win | 18–7 (1) | Andrew Whitney | Decision (unanimous) | Driller Promotions - No Mercy 6 | September 30, 2017 | 3 | 5:00 | Mahnomen, Minnesota, United States | |
| Win | 17–7 (1) | Darrick Minner | Decision (unanimous) | LFA 2 | January 20, 2017 | 3 | 5:00 | Prior Lake, Minnesota, United States | Return to Bantamweight. |
| Win | 16–7 (1) | Czar Sklavos | Decision (unanimous) | RFA 40: Sklavos vs. Camus | July 15, 2016 | 3 | 5:00 | Prior Lake, Minnesota, United States | |
| Win | 15–7 (1) | Matt Brown | Decision (unanimous) | RFA 36: Brown vs. Camus | March 3, 2016 | 3 | 5:00 | Prior Lake, Minnesota, United States | |
| Loss | 14–7 (1) | Kyoji Horiguchi | Decision (unanimous) | UFC Fight Night: Barnett vs. Nelson | September 27, 2015 | 3 | 5:00 | Saitama, Japan | |
| Loss | 14–6 (1) | Henry Cejudo | Decision (unanimous) | UFC 188 | June 13, 2015 | 3 | 5:00 | Mexico City, Mexico | |
| Win | 14–5 (1) | Brad Pickett | Decision (split) | UFC Fight Night: Edgar vs. Swanson | November 22, 2014 | 3 | 5:00 | Austin, Texas, United States | Flyweight debut. |
| Loss | 13–5 (1) | Chris Holdsworth | Decision (unanimous) | UFC 173 | May 24, 2014 | 3 | 5:00 | Las Vegas, Nevada, United States | |
| NC | 13–4 (1) | Yaotzin Meza | NC (overturned) | UFC on Fox: Henderson vs. Thomson | January 25, 2014 | 3 | 5:00 | Chicago, Illinois, United States | Originally a unanimous decision win for Camus; Overturned after he tested positive for marijuana. |
| Win | 13–4 | Kyung Ho Kang | Decision (unanimous) | UFC 164 | August 31, 2013 | 3 | 5:00 | Milwaukee, Wisconsin, United States | |
| Loss | 12–4 | Dustin Kimura | Submission (rear-naked choke) | UFC 156 | February 2, 2013 | 3 | 1:50 | Las Vegas, Nevada, United States | Catchweight (139.5 lbs) bout; Kimura missed weight. |
| Win | 12–3 | Dustin Pague | Decision (unanimous) | UFC 150 | August 11, 2012 | 3 | 5:00 | Denver, Colorado, United States | |
| Win | 11–3 | Alp Ozkilic | Decision (unanimous) | LFC 52: Tachi Tourney Semifinals | April 13, 2012 | 3 | 5:00 | Indianapolis, Indiana, United States | LFC Bantamweight Tournament Semifinal. |
| Win | 10–3 | Daniel Aguirre | Decision (unanimous) | LFC 51: Little Giants | February 10, 2012 | 3 | 5:00 | Indianapolis, Indiana, United States | LFC Bantamweight Tournament Quarterfinal. |
| Win | 9–3 | Eugene Crisler | Decision (unanimous) | Madtown Throwdown 26: The Return | January 7, 2012 | 3 | 5:00 | Madison Wisconsin, United States | |
| Loss | 8–3 | Rob Menigoz | Decision (split) | Chicago Cagefighting Championship 4 | October 15, 2011 | 3 | 5:00 | Villa Park, Illinois, United States | |
| Win | 8–2 | Nate Williams | KO (punch) | Combat USA: Country USA 1 | June 25, 2011 | 1 | 1:59 | Oshkosh, Wisconsin, United States | |
| Loss | 7–2 | Jameel Massouh | Decision (unanimous) | NAFC: Bad Blood | November 24, 2010 | 3 | 5:00 | Milwaukee, Wisconsin, United States | |
| Win | 7–1 | Craig Early | Submission (guillotine choke) | Extreme Cagefighting Organization 7 | August 21, 2010 | 2 | 2:30 | Wisconsin Dells, Wisconsin, United States | |
| Win | 6–1 | John Hosman | TKO (punches) | NAFC: Unstoppable | June 5, 2010 | 3 | 2:51 | Oconomowoc, Wisconsin, United States | |
| Win | 5–1 | Joe Pearson | TKO (punches) | NAFC: Stand Your Ground | April 3, 2010 | 2 | 3:57 | West Allis, Wisconsin, United States | |
| Win | 4–1 | Ken Sitsler | TKO (punches) | GCF: Fair Warning | August 15, 2009 | 1 | 3:32 | Milwaukee, Wisconsin, United States | Won the GCF Bantamweight Championship. |
| Win | 3–1 | Marco Daniels | Submission (rear-naked choke) | GCF: Clash of the Titans | May 16, 2009 | 2 | 1:52 | Milwaukee, Wisconsin, United States | |
| Win | 2–1 | Seth Marquez | Decision (unanimous) | GCF: The Good, the Bad and the Ugly | March 14, 2009 | 3 | 5:00 | Milwaukee, Wisconsin, United States | |
| Loss | 1–1 | Marco Daniels | TKO (punches) | Racine Fight Night 2 | February 28, 2009 | 1 | 1:43 | Racine, Wisconsin, United States | |
| Win | 1–0 | Scott Blevins | Submission (punches) | Evolution Fighting Championships 7 | February 14, 2009 | 1 | 1:15 | Oshkosh, Wisconsin, United States | |

== See also ==
- List of current UFC fighters
- List of male mixed martial artists
