= UFC 173 =

UFC mixed martial arts event in 2014

UFC 173: Barão vs. Dillashaw
- The poster for UFC 173: Barão vs. Dillashaw
- Promotion: Ultimate Fighting Championship
- Date: May 24, 2014
- Venue: MGM Grand Garden Arena
- City: Las Vegas, Nevada
- Attendance: 13,936
- Total gate: $1.7 million
- Buyrate: 215,000

Event chronology
UFC Fight Night: Brown vs. Silva	UFC 173: Barão vs. Dillashaw	UFC Fight Night: Muñoz vs. Mousasi

UFC 173: Barão vs. Dillashaw was a mixed martial arts event held at the MGM Grand Garden Arena in Las Vegas, Nevada, on May 24, 2014.

== Background ==
A Middleweight Championship bout between then champion Chris Weidman and number one contender Vitor Belfort was scheduled to headline this event. However, on February 27, the Nevada State Athletic Commission officially banned testosterone replacement therapy (TRT) from combat sports. Belfort, who was using such therapy, was forced to withdraw from the bout and stated, "Given the time constraints involved between now and my proposed next bout in May, I have determined not to apply for a license to fight in Nevada at this time."

The main event was quickly changed as former UFC Light Heavyweight Champion Lyoto Machida agreed to step in to face Weidman for the title. However, on March 24, the UFC announced that Weidman had suffered a knee injury and that a new headline bout would be found. The Weidman title defense against Machida was moved to UFC 175 in July.

After the announcement that Weidman/Machida bout had been moved, a Bantamweight Championship bout between Renan Barão and Raphael Assunção was targeted as the event headliner. However, Assunção opted to decline the bout as a rib injury sustained in his last bout at UFC 170 had not healed enough to resume the proper training in advance of the event. Barão instead fought T.J. Dillashaw in the main event. As a result, Dillashaw's original opponent at the event, Takeya Mizugaki, faced Francisco Rivera.

The originally scheduled co-main event was Junior dos Santos against Stipe Miocic. However, that bout was moved to The Ultimate Fighter Brazil 3 Finale. Subsequently, the bout between Dan Henderson and Daniel Cormier, briefly linked to UFC 175 was moved up to this event to bolster the card.

The coaches bout between The Ultimate Fighter: Brazil 3 participants Chael Sonnen and Wanderlei Silva was briefly linked to this event. However, the fight was moved twice – first being on May 31, 2014, at The Ultimate Fighter: Brazil 3 Finale, then it was to be contested on July 5, 2014, at UFC 175 but the fight eventually was called off for various reasons.

A lightweight bout between Yves Edwards and Piotr Hallmann was expected to take place at this event. However, the fight was moved to UFC Fight Night 42.

Kyung Ho Kang was expected to face Chris Holdsworth at the event. However, Kang pulled out of the bout and was replaced by Chico Camus.

Doo Ho Choi was expected to make his promotional debut at the event against Sam Sicilia. However, Choi was forced out of the bout with an injury, and was replaced by UFC newcomer Aaron Phillips.

Danny Mitchell was expected to face promotional newcomer Li Jingliang. However, Mitchell pulled out of the bout with an injury. Replacing Mitchell was The Ultimate Fighter: Team Carwin vs. Team Nelson cast member David Michaud.

== Results ==
Main Card
Weight class				Method	Round	Time	Notes
Bantamweight	T.J. Dillashaw	def.	Renan Barão (c)	TKO (head kick and punches)	5	2:26	(Note: For the UFC Bantamweight Championship)
Light Heavyweight	Daniel Cormier	def.	Dan Henderson	Technical Submission (rear-naked choke)	3	3:53
Welterweight	Robbie Lawler	def.	Jake Ellenberger	TKO (knee and punches)	3	3:06
Bantamweight	Takeya Mizugaki	def.	Francisco Rivera	Decision (unanimous) (29–28, 30–27, 30–27)	3	5:00
Lightweight	James Krause	def.	Jamie Varner	TKO (ankle injury)	1	5:00
Preliminary card (Fox Sports 1)
Lightweight	Michael Chiesa	def.	Francisco Trinaldo	Decision (unanimous) (30–26, 30–26, 30–27)	3	5:00
Lightweight	Tony Ferguson	def.	Katsunori Kikuno	KO (punch)	1	4:06
Bantamweight	Chris Holdsworth	def.	Chico Camus	Decision (unanimous) (30–27, 30–27, 30–27)	3	5:00
Lightweight	Mitch Clarke	def.	Al Iaquinta	Technical Submission (D'Arce choke)	2	0:57
Preliminary card (UFC Fight Pass)
Lightweight	Vinc Pichel	def.	Anthony Njokuani	Decision (unanimous) (30–27, 30–27, 29–28)	3	5:00
Featherweight	Sam Sicilia	def.	Aaron Phillips	Decision (unanimous) (29–28, 29–28, 30–27)	3	5:00
Welterweight	Li Jingliang	def.	David Michaud	Decision (split) (29–28, 28–29, 30–27)	3	5:00

== Bonus awards ==
The following fighters received $50,000 bonuses:

- Fight of the Night: Renan Barão vs. T.J. Dillashaw
- Performance of the Night: T.J. Dillashaw and Mitch Clarke

== Reported payout ==
The following is the reported payout to the fighters as reported to the Nevada State Athletic Commission. It does not include sponsor money and also does not include the UFC's traditional "fight night" bonuses.

- T.J. Dillashaw: $36,000 (includes $18,000 win bonus) def. Renan Barão: $74,000
- Daniel Cormier: $170,000 (includes $85,000 win bonus) def. Dan Henderson: $100,000
- Robbie Lawler: $200,000 (includes $100,000 win bonus) def. Jake Ellenberger: $68,000
- Takeya Mizugaki: $58,000 (includes $29,000 win bonus) def. Francisco Rivera: $15,000
- James Krause: $20,000 (includes $10,000 win bonus) def. Jamie Varner: $17,000
- Michael Chiesa: $40,000 (includes $20,000 win bonus) def. Francisco Trinaldo: $12,000
- Tony Ferguson: $40,000 (includes $20,000 win bonus) def. Katsunori Kikuno: $10,000
- Chris Holdsworth: $30,000 (includes $15,000 win bonus) def. Chico Camus: $12,000
- Mitch Clarke: $20,000 (includes $10,000 win bonus) def. Al Iaquinta: $14,000
- Vinc Pichel: $16,000 (includes $8,000 win bonus) def. Anthony Njokuani: $20,000
- Sam Sicilia: $20,000 (includes $10,000 win bonus) def. Aaron Phillips: $8,000
- Li Jingliang: $16,000 (includes $10,000 win bonus) def. David Michaud: $8,000

== See also ==
- List of UFC events
- 2014 in UFC
