= Chris Holdsworth =

American mixed martial arts fighter

- Born: October 24, 1987 (age 38); Van Nuys, California, U.S.
- Other names: Holds It Down
- Height: 5 ft 11 in (1.80 m)
- Weight: 135 lb (61 kg; 9.6 st)
- Division: Bantamweight
- Reach: 71 in (180 cm)
- Style: Kickboxing, Brazilian Jiu-Jitsu
- Stance: Orthodox
- Fighting out of: Sacramento, California
- Team: Team Alpha Male
- Rank: Black belt in Brazilian Jiu-Jitsu
- Years active: 2010–2014

Mixed martial arts record
- Total: 6
- Wins: 6
- By submission: 5
- By decision: 1
- Losses: 0

Amateur record
- Total: 4
- Wins: 4
- By knockout: 2
- By submission: 2

Other information
- Mixed martial arts record from Sherdog

Chris Holdsworth (born October 24, 1987) is an American former mixed martial artist who competed in the Ultimate Fighting Championship. He was the winner of The Ultimate Fighter: Team Rousey vs. Team Tate.

== Mixed martial arts career ==
=== Background ===
His father was a martial artist and Vietnam War veteran, his mother is a breast cancer survivor and his grandfather was a Golden Gloves boxer.

When he was eight years old, his elder brother was shot and killed. At his brother’s funeral, his sensei posthumously awarded him his black belt in American kickboxing. Holdsworth, aged 8, told his mother he wanted to be a martial artist just like his brother so he excelled in several martial arts, especially BJJ. He was awarded his blue belt from the legendary Royce Gracie, his purple belt by Rener, Ryron and Rorion Gracie, and was awarded his brown and black belt by Marc Laimon. At age 21 he was one of the youngest BJJ black belts in the US.

=== Amateur career ===
Holdsworth signed with the Tuff-N-Uff promotion in August 2009, and made his debut as an amateur against Justin Linn. He won his debut by triangle choke submission. He made a quick turnaround and faced Cameron Ramirez on September 18, 2009, and won the fight by TKO (punches). After taking a small hiatus, Holdsworth returned on February 26, 2010, facing Gor Mnatsakanyan. He won by TKO, extending his undefeated record to 3-0.

In his last amateur fight before turning pro, Holdsworth faced Anthony Gutierrez at Tuff-N-Uff: Xtreme Couture vs. Team Quest on August 6, 2010. He won by armbar, and turned pro in October of that year.

=== Professional MMA career ===
Holdsworth made his professional MMA debut in October 2010. He's a member of 'Team Alpha Male' and had four fights before joining the Ultimate Fighter. He won all of them by submission.

=== The Ultimate Fighter ===
In August 2013, it was announced that Holdsworth was one of the fighters selected to be on The Ultimate Fighter: Team Rousey vs. Team Tate.

Holdsworth faced Louis Fisette in the elimination fight to get into the house. He defeated him via arm-triangle choke in the first round.

Holdsworth was the second pick of Team Tate. During the first tournament fight in the house, Holdsworth faced team Rousey's #1 pick Chris Beal. Miesha Tate selected this match up because of a possible advantage when they heard that Beal probably had an injured hand. The consensus was that Beal would have the better of the striking while Holdsworth would be dominant in the ground, but Beal was dominated in the striking, even being knocked down and then submitted via guillotine choke in the first round.

In the semifinals, Holdsworth faced off against Michael Wooten. He won the fight via rear-naked choke in the first round.

=== Ultimate Fighting Championship ===
Holdsworth faced Davey Grant in the finals on November 30, 2013 at The Ultimate Fighter 18 Finale. He won the bout via rear-naked choke in the second round.

Holdsworth was expected to face Kang Kyung-ho on May 24, 2014 at UFC 173. However, Kang pulled out of the bout and was replaced by Chico Camus. He won the fight via unanimous decision.

Holdsworth has been absent from competitive fighting since 2014, with Holdsworth taking an indefinite hiatus from competition due to post-concussion syndrome.

== Personal life ==
Holdsworth also teaches at his own Jiu Jitsu Academy in Orangevale California while also being a cornerman for Darren Elkins.

== Championships and accomplishments ==
- Ultimate Fighting Championship
  - The Ultimate Fighter 18 Tournament Winner
  - Submission of the Night (One time) vs. Davey Grant
  - UFC.com Awards
    - 2013: Ranked #8 Newcomer of the Year

== Mixed martial arts record ==
Professional record breakdown
6 matches	6 wins	0 losses
By submission	5	0
By decision	1	0

Res.	Record	Opponent	Method	Event	Date	Round	Time	Location	Notes
Win	6–0	Chico Camus	Decision (unanimous)	UFC 173	May 24, 2014	3	5:00	Las Vegas, Nevada, United States	
Win	5–0	Davey Grant	Submission (rear-naked choke)	The Ultimate Fighter 18 Finale	November 30, 2013	2	2:10	Las Vegas, Nevada, United States	Won The Ultimate Fighter 18 Tournament. Submission of the Night.
Win	4–0	Tyler Shinn	Submission (triangle choke)	RFA 4	November 2, 2012	2	1:32	Las Vegas, Nevada, United States	
Win	3–0	Juan Rivas	Submission (armbar)	KOTC: Next Generation	June 30, 2011	1	1:29	Highland, California, United States	
Win	2–0	Gustavo Limon	Submission (rear-naked choke)	Gladiator Challenge: Legends Collide 2	February 20, 2011	1	0:45	San Jacinto, California, United States	
Win	1–0	Randy Villarreal	Submission (rear-naked choke)	Xtreme Knockout 8	October 9, 2010	1	2:05	Arlington, Texas, United States	

== Mixed martial arts exhibition record ==
Professional record breakdown
3 matches	3 wins	0 losses
By submission	3	0

Res.	Record	Opponent	Method	Event	Date	Round	Time	Location	Notes
Win	3–0	Michael Wootten	Submission (rear-naked choke)	The Ultimate Fighter: Team Rousey vs. Team Tate	November 6, 2013 (airdate)	1	3:11	Las Vegas, Nevada, United States	The Ultimate Fighter 18 Semifinals round
Win	2–0	Chris Beal	Submission (guillotine choke)	The Ultimate Fighter: Team Rousey vs. Team Tate	September 18, 2013 (airdate)	1	4:16	Las Vegas, Nevada, United States	The Ultimate Fighter 18 Quarterfinals round
Win	1–0	Louis Fisette	Submission (arm-triangle choke)	The Ultimate Fighter: Team Rousey vs. Team Tate	September 4, 2013 (airdate)	1	4:09	Las Vegas, Nevada, United States	The Ultimate Fighter 18 Elimination round

== Amateur mixed martial arts record ==
Professional record breakdown
4 matches	4 wins	0 losses
By knockout	2	0
By submission	2	0

Res.	Record	Opponent	Method	Event	Date	Round	Time	Location	Notes
Win	4–0	Anthony Gutierrez	Submission (armbar)	Tuff-N-Uff - Xtreme Couture vs. Team Quest	August 6, 2010	1	2:32	Las Vegas, Nevada, United States	
Win	3–0	Gor Mnatsakanyan	TKO (punches)	Tuff-N-Uff - Future Stars of MMA	February 26, 2010	1	2:10	Las Vegas, Nevada, United States	
Win	2–0	Cameron Ramirez	TKO (punches)	Tuff-N-Uff - Future Stars of MMA	September 18, 2009	1	1:31	Las Vegas, Nevada, United States	
Win	1–0	Justin Linn	Submission (triangle choke)	Tuff-N-Uff - Back2Back	August 22, 2009	1	1:58	Las Vegas, Nevada, United States	

== See also ==
- List of current UFC fighters
- List of male mixed martial artists
