= UFC Fight Night: Mir vs. Duffee =

UFC mixed martial arts event in 2015

- The poster for UFC Fight Night: Mir vs. Duffee
- Promotion: Ultimate Fighting Championship
- Date: July 15, 2015
- Venue: Valley View Casino Center
- City: San Diego, California
- Attendance: 5,471
- Total gate: $412,000

Event chronology
The Ultimate Fighter: American Top Team vs. Blackzilians Finale	UFC Fight Night: Mir vs. Duffee	UFC Fight Night: Bisping vs. Leites

UFC Fight Night: Mir vs. Duffee (also known as UFC Fight Night 71) was a mixed martial arts event held on July 15, 2015, at Valley View Casino Center in San Diego, California.

== Background ==
The event was headlined by a heavyweight bout between former UFC Heavyweight champion Frank Mir and touted prospect Todd Duffee.

Bobby Green was expected to face Al Iaquinta at the event. However, Green pulled out of the fight on June 17 due to an ACL tear and was replaced by former WEC and Strikeforce Lightweight champion Gilbert Melendez. On July 6, it was announced that Melendez tested positive for testosterone metabolites of an exogenous origin at UFC 188. He denied using anything, but stated that he is "responsible for the products he uses and their implications". Melendez was suspended one year, effective from the date of his last bout. As a result, he was pulled from the fight against Iaquinta, who in turn, was also removed from the card.

A featherweight bout between Rani Yahya and Masanori Kanehara initially slated for UFC Fight Night 70, was shifted to this event, as several participants on that card were unable to secure travel visas in time for that event restricting their travel to the United States.

Edgar Garcia was expected to face Andrew Craig at the event. However, Garcia was forced out of the bout with an injury and was replaced by promotional newcomer Lyman Good.

Doo Ho Choi was expected to face Sam Sicilia at the event. However, Choi pulled out of the bout in late June after suffering broken ribs in training and was replaced by Yaotzin Meza.

== Results ==
Main Card (Fox Sports 1)
Weight class				Method	Round	Time	Notes
Heavyweight	Frank Mir	def.	Todd Duffee	KO (punch)	1	1:13
Lightweight	Tony Ferguson	def.	Josh Thomson	Decision (unanimous) (30–27, 30–27, 30–26)	3	5:00
Women's Bantamweight	Holly Holm	def.	Marion Reneau	Decision (unanimous) (30–27, 30–26, 29–28)	3	5:00
Bantamweight	Manvel Gamburyan	def.	Scott Jorgensen	Decision (unanimous) (30–27, 30–27, 30–27)	3	5:00
Lightweight	Kevin Lee	def.	James Moontasri	Submission (rear-naked choke)	1	2:56
Welterweight	Alan Jouban	def.	Matt Dwyer	Decision (unanimous) (29–27, 29–27, 29–27)	3	5:00	(Note: Jouban was deducted one point in the first round for an illegal knee strike.)
Preliminary Card (Fox Sports 1)
Featherweight	Sam Sicilia	def.	Yaotzin Meza	Decision (unanimous) (30–27, 29–28, 29–28)	3	5:00
Women's Bantamweight	Jéssica Andrade	def.	Sarah Moras	Decision (unanimous) (30–27, 30–27, 30–27)	3	5:00
Bantamweight	Rani Yahya	def.	Masanori Kanehara	Decision (split) (29–28, 28–29, 29–28)	3	5:00
Welterweight	Sean Strickland	def.	Igor Araújo	Decision (unanimous) (30–27, 30–27, 30–26)	3	5:00
Preliminary Card (UFC Fight Pass)
Middleweight	Kevin Casey	def.	Ildemar Alcântara	Decision (unanimous) (30–27, 30–27, 30–27)	3	5:00
Welterweight	Lyman Good	def.	Andrew Craig	TKO (punches)	2	3:37

== Bonus awards ==
The following fighters were awarded $50,000 bonuses:

- Fight of the Night: Alan Jouban vs. Matt Dwyer
- Performance of the Night: Frank Mir and Tony Ferguson

== Reported payout ==
The following is the reported payout to the fighters as reported to the California State Athletic Commission. It does not include sponsor money or "locker room" bonuses often given by the UFC and also do not include the UFC's traditional "fight night" bonuses.

- Frank Mir: $200,000 (no win bonus) def. Todd Duffee: $12,000
- Tony Ferguson: $60,000 ($30,000 win bonus) def. Josh Thomson: $85,000
- Holly Holm: $50,000 ($25,000 win bonus) def. Marion Reneau: $12,000
- Manvel Gamburyan: $60,000 ($30,000 win bonus) def. Scott Jorgensen: $33,000
- Kevin Lee: $36,000 ($18,000 win bonus) def. James Moontasri: $10,000
- Alan Jouban: $30,000 ($15,000 win bonus) def. Matt Dwyer: $10,000
- Sam Sicilia: $36,000 ($18,000 win bonus) vs. Yaotzin Meza: $16,000
- Jéssica Andrade: $32,000 ($16,000 win bonus) def. Sarah Moras: $10,000
- Rani Yahya: $54,000 ($27,000 win bonus) def. Masanori Kanehara: $14,000
- Sean Strickland: $34,000 ($17,000 win bonus) def. Igor Araújo: $15,000
- Kevin Casey: $20,000 ($10,000 win bonus) def. Ildemar Alcântara: $20,000
- Lyman Good: $20,000 ($10,000 win bonus) def. Andrew Craig: $17,000

== See also ==
- List of UFC events
- 2015 in UFC
