= King Green =

American mixed martial artist (born 1986)

- Born: Bobby Ray Green; September 9, 1986 (age 40); San Bernardino, California, U.S.
- Height: 5 ft 10 in (178 cm)
- Weight: 155 lb (70 kg; 11 st 1 lb)
- Division: Welterweight (2008–2010); Lightweight (2008–present); Super Lightweight (Note: While competing in King of the Cage, Green competed in their 165 pound division and held their 165 pound title. At the time Green competed in KOTC, they referred to their 165 pound class as "Junior Welterweight".)
- Reach: 71 in (180 cm)
- Stance: Orthodox
- Fighting out of: Fontana, California, U.S.
- Team: Pinnacle MMA (2009–present)
- Rank: Brown belt in Brazilian Jiu-Jitsu under Marcos "Loro" Galvão
- Years active: 2008–present

Mixed martial arts record
- Total: 56
- Wins: 36
- By knockout: 13
- By submission: 10
- By decision: 13
- Losses: 18
- By knockout: 7
- By submission: 3
- By decision: 8
- Draws: 1
- No contests: 1

Other information
- Mixed martial arts record from Sherdog

King Green (born Bobby Ray Green; September 9, 1986) is an American professional mixed martial artist. He currently competes in the Lightweight division of the Ultimate Fighting Championship (UFC). A professional since 2008, Green is the former King of the Cage Lightweight Champion and Junior Welterweight Champion, and in addition he has also competed in Tachi Palace Fights, Strikeforce, and Affliction.

== Background ==
Green was born in San Bernardino, California, and became a foster child when he was five years old, as his father was incarcerated and mother was unable to take care of her children due to a drug addiction. Green began wrestling in his sophomore year at A.B. Miller High School in Fontana, California, placing twice in the state tournament. Green began pursuing a career in professional mixed martial arts while he was also working at a warehouse to help support his son.

== Mixed martial arts career ==
=== Early career ===
Green made his professional mixed martial arts debut in January 2008, and quickly amassed an 8–1 record while fighting on independent events.

Green drew the attention of Affliction Entertainment and fought on their second (and final) card Day of Reckoning. He lost to Dan Lauzon via submission in the first round. Green was docked two points in the first round, in what Sherdog has called one of the dirtiest fights in recent memory.

Following the loss, Green began a successful run in the King of the Cage promotion. On February 25, 2010, Green defeated Ricky Legere via first-round TKO to win the King of the Cage Junior Welterweight Championship at KOTC Arrival at the San Manuel Casino in Highland, California. He eventually defended the title once before losing it to Tim Means. On April 21, Green defeated Dom O'Grady by unanimous decision to win the King of the Cage Lightweight Championship.

=== Strikeforce ===
On July 14, 2011, it was announced that Green had signed a four-fight deal with Strikeforce. It was originally announced that Green would debut against Milton Vieira at Strikeforce Challengers: Gurgel vs. Duarte. However, on July 19, it was announced he would be filling in for Lyle Beerbohm against Gesias Cavalcante at Strikeforce: Fedor vs. Henderson. The fight was very back and forth, but Green lost the fight via a narrow split decision.

His next bout came against Charon Spain at Strikeforce Challengers: Larkin vs. Rossborough. Green won the fight via submission (arm-triangle choke) in the second round but is out indefinitely due to left and right hand injuries.

Green was scheduled to face Isaac Vallie-Flagg at Strikeforce Challengers: Britt vs. Sayers. However, Vallie-Flagg was forced out of the bout with an injury and replaced by J. P. Reese. He won the fight via submission in the third round.

On May 19, 2012, Green faced James Terry at Strikeforce: Barnett vs. Cormier where he won via split decision (28–29, 29–28, 29–28).

Green next faced Matt Ricehouse on August 18, 2012, at Strikeforce: Rousey vs. Kaufman and won the fight via unanimous decision.

=== Ultimate Fighting Championship ===
==== 2013 ====
Green defeated Jacob Volkmann on February 2, 2013, at UFC 156 via rear-naked choke submission in the third round. After back and forth action in the first two rounds, Green displayed some great grappling, countering Volkmann's attempts and finishing with the choke after some vicious ground and pound, which forced Volkmann to give up his back. The performance earned Green Submission of the Night honors.

Green was expected to face Danny Castillo on July 27, 2013, at UFC on Fox 8. However, in mid-July, Green pulled out of the bout citing an injury and was replaced by Tim Means.

Green faced James Krause on November 6, 2013, at UFC Fight Night 31. The fight ended in unusual fashion as Green had previously kicked Krause in the groin area twice, resulting in a one-point deduction. Green then landed a blow to Krause's belt line, which resulted in Krause falling to the canvas. Referee John McCarthy declared it a legal blow and awarded Green a TKO victory.

Green quickly stepped back into the octagon filling in for the injured Jamie Varner against Pat Healy at UFC on Fox 9. He won the fight via unanimous decision.

==== 2014 ====
Green was expected to face Abel Trujillo on February 1, 2014, at UFC 169. However, Green pulled out due to undisclosed reasons and was replaced by Jamie Varner.

Green was expected to face Jim Miller on April 26, 2014, at UFC 172. However, in the week leading up to the event, Green pulled out of the bout citing another injury and was replaced by Yancy Medeiros.

The bout with Trujillo was rescheduled for August 2, 2014, at UFC 176. However, after UFC 176 was cancelled, Green/Trujillo was rescheduled and was expected to take place on August 16, 2014, at UFC Fight Night 47. Subsequently, Green was removed from this fight on July 11 in favor of a matchup with against Josh Thomson as Green replaced Michael Johnson on July 26, 2014, at UFC on Fox 12. Green won the bout via split decision.

A bout with Jorge Masvidal, first scheduled under the Strikeforce banner in 2012 before being scrapped, was expected to take place on September 27, 2014, at UFC 178. However, on August 14, the UFC announced that Green would now face Donald Cerrone at the event. Following the signing and scheduling of former Bellator MMA Lightweight Champion Eddie Alvarez to face Cerrone at the event, Green was rescheduled to compete at a later, undetermined date.

Green faced Edson Barboza on November 22, 2014, at UFC Fight Night 57. Green lost the fight via unanimous decision.

==== 2015 ====
Green was briefly linked to a bout with Jorge Masvidal on April 4, 2015, at UFC Fight Night 63. However, shortly after the fight was announced by the UFC, Green pulled out of the bout citing an injury and was replaced by Benson Henderson

Green was expected to face Al Iaquinta on July 15, 2015, at UFC Fight Night 71. However, Green pulled out of the fight in mid-June citing another injury.

==== 2016 ====
Green next faced Dustin Poirier on June 4, 2016, at UFC 199. He lost the fight via knockout in the first round.

Green was expected to face Josh Burkman on October 1, 2016, at UFC Fight Night 96. However, Green pulled out of the fight on September 9 citing personal issues and was replaced by promotional newcomer Zak Ottow.

==== 2017 ====
Green faced Rashid Magomedov on April 15, 2017, at UFC on Fox 24. He lost the fight by split decision.

As the last fight of his prevailing contract, Green faced Lando Vannata on October 7, 2017, at UFC 216. In round one Vannata landed an illegal knee to the head of the grounded Green, which caused referee Herb Dean to deduct Vannata a point. The judges handed down a split draw after three rounds with one judge had it even 28–28, one judge scored it 29–27 to Green, and one judge scored it 29–27 for Vannata. This fight earned him Fight of the Night award.

==== 2018 ====
Green faced Erik Koch on January 27, 2018, at UFC on Fox: Jacaré vs. Brunson 2. He won the fight via unanimous decision.

Green was expected to face Beneil Dariush on March 3, 2018, at UFC 222. However, on February 14, 2018, it was announced that Green was forced to pull out from the event, citing injury.

Green was expected to face Clay Guida on June 9, 2018, at UFC 225. However, Green was forced out of the bout due to an injury and was replaced by Charles Oliveira

Green faced Drakkar Klose on December 15 at UFC on Fox 31 He lost the fight by unanimous decision. Green announced his retirement after he lost the fight.

==== 2019–2020 ====
After his brief hiatus, Green returned to face Francisco Trinaldo on November 16, 2019, at UFC on ESPN+ 22. He lost the fight via unanimous decision.

Green faced Clay Guida on June 20, 2020, at UFC Fight Night: Blaydes vs. Volkov. He won the fight via unanimous decision.

A rematch with Lando Vannata took place on August 1, 2020, at UFC Fight Night: Brunson vs. Shahbazyan. He won the fight via unanimous decision. This fight earned him the Fight of the Night award.

Green faced Alan Patrick, replacing Rodrigo Vargas on September 12, 2020, at UFC Fight Night 177. He won the fight via unanimous decision.

Green faced Thiago Moisés on October 31, 2020, at UFC Fight Night 181. He lost the fight via unanimous decision. However 11 out of 15 media outlets scored the bout as a win for Green.

==== 2021 ====
Green was expected to face Jim Miller on February 13, 2021, at UFC 258. However the fight was cancelled when Green collapsed after the weigh-ins.

Green faced Rafael Fiziev on August 7, 2021, at UFC 265. He lost the fight via unanimous decision. This fight earned him the Fight of the Night award.

Green faced Al Iaquinta on November 6, 2021, at UFC 268. Green won the fight by TKO in round one. This win earned him the Performance of the Night award.

==== 2022 ====
Green faced Nasrat Haqparast on February 12, 2022, at UFC 271. He won the bout via unanimous decision.

Just two weeks after his last UFC bout, Green stepped up to replace an injured Beneil Dariush against Islam Makhachev on February 26, 2022, in the main event at UFC Fight Night 202. He lost the bout via TKO in the first round.

Green was rebooked to face Jim Miller for the third time on July 2, 2022, at UFC 276. A week before the event, Green was forced to pull out of the bout.

Green received a six-month USADA suspension for 6 months testing positive Dehydroepiandrosterone (DHEA) on out of competition drug test on May 16, 2022, and he is eligible to fight again on November 16, 2022.

Green faced Drew Dober on December 17, 2022, at UFC Fight Night 216. He lost the fight via knockout in round two. This fight earned him the Fight of the Night award.

==== 2023 ====
Green faced Jared Gordon on April 22, 2023, at UFC Fight Night 222. Green won the fight by knockout in the first round, following an accidental clash of heads that went unnoticed by the referee. Upon review, the ringside officials determined a clash of heads indeed occurred, with the result being changed to a no contest.

Green faced Tony Ferguson at UFC 291 on July 29, 2023. He won the fight via technical submission, rendering Ferguson unconscious with an arm-triangle choke late in the third round. The win also earned Green his second Performance of the Night bonus award.

Green faced Grant Dawson on October 7, 2023, at UFC Fight Night 229. Green won the fight via knockout in the round one. This win earned him the Performance of the Night award.

Green was scheduled to face Dan Hooker on December 2, 2023, at UFC on ESPN 52. However, the week before the event, Hooker withdrew due to injury, and was replaced by Jalin Turner. Green lost the fight via knockout in the first round.

==== 2024 ====
Green faced Jim Miller on April 13, 2024, at UFC 300. He won the fight via unanimous decision.

Green faced Paddy Pimblett on July 27, 2024, at UFC 304. He lost the fight by a triangle-choke submission in the first round.

==== 2025 ====
Green faced Mauricio Ruffy on March 8, 2025 at UFC 313. He lost the fight via a spinning wheel kick knockout in the first round.

Green was scheduled to face Carlos Diego Ferreira on August 16, 2025 at UFC 319. However, Green suffered an undisclosed injury and the bout was cancelled.

Green faced Lance Gibson Jr. on December 13, 2025, at UFC on ESPN 73. He won the fight via split decision.

==== 2026 ====
Green faced Daniel Zellhuber on February 28, 2026 at UFC Fight Night 268. He won the fight by technical knockout at the end of the second round.

Green faced Jeremy Stephens on May 9, 2026 at UFC 328. Due to Stephens weighing in at 160 pounds, 4 pounds over the lightweight non-title fight limit, the bout is scheduled to proceed at catchweight and Stephens was fined 30 percent of his purse, which went to Green. He won the fight via submission in the first round.

Green faced Terrance McKinney on July 11, 2026 at UFC 329. He won the fight by technical knockout with one second remaining in the first round. This fight earned him a $100,000 Performance of the Night award.

Green faced Esteban Ribovics on October 3, 2026 at UFC 332. At the weigh-ins, Ribovics weighed in at 156.5 pounds, half a pound over the lightweight non-title fight limit. the bout proceeded at catchweight and he was fined 20 percent of his purse, which went to Green. He lost the fight by technical knockout in the first round.

== Fighting style ==
King Green's striking style in mixed martial arts is built around his boxing and defensive mastery. His approach is heavily influenced by the Philly Shell defensive system, where he uses his lead shoulder to protect his chin while keeping his rear hand glued to his temple. Green also shows a willingness to keep his hands low even in the pocket using calculated baiting. Green drops his hands to draw out an opponent's offense, intending to counter it with a shoulder roll and strikes of his own.

His footwork and stance-switching add another layer of complexity to his game. Green flows seamlessly between orthodox and southpaw stances, maintaining fluidity from either position. He constantly takes small angles through L-steps and stance switches while keeping his head balanced over either leg. This movement sets up his straight punches when opponents attempt to walk him down, Green snaps jabs and crosses disrupting his opponent's combinations. He is also known for his pull counter and ability to slip and fire simultaneously.

While primarily a boxer, Green's arsenal includes effective kicking attacks, particularly from southpaw where he targets the inside thigh and liver. His takedown defense has been consistently strong throughout his career, defending 71% of attempts, and he's known as a scrambler who rarely offers much control time on bottom. Green also incorporates offensive wrestling, securing body locks and slamming opponents when they shoot on him.

== Personal life ==
Green has three children. In April 2023, ahead of UFC Vegas 71, he announced he would legally retire the name “Bobby Green” and transition to his longtime nickname by changing his name to “King.” In July 2024, he confirmed the legal name change to “King Green,” sharing a video of his amended birth certificate.

== Championships and accomplishments ==
=== Mixed martial arts ===
- Ultimate Fighting Championship
  - Submission of the Night (One time) vs. Jacob Volkmann
  - Performance of the Night (Four times) vs. Al Iaquinta, Tony Ferguson, Grant Dawson and Terrance McKinney
  - Fight of the Night (Four times) vs. Lando Vannata (2x), Rafael Fiziev and Drew Dober
  - Most significant strikes in UFC Lightweight division history (2077)
    - Fourth most significant strikes landed in UFC history (2151)
  - Tied (Clay Guida) for second most bouts in UFC Lightweight division history (30) (behind Jim Miller)
  - Most total strikes landed in UFC Lightweight division history (2312)
  - Tied (Gleison Tibau) for fifth most wins in UFC Lightweight division history (16)
  - Fifth most total fight time in UFC Lightweight division history (5:08:00)
  - Fourth highest striking differential in UFC Lightweight division history (2.9)
  - Second highest significant strike differential in a UFC Lightweight bout (+129) (vs. Jim Miller)
    - Third highest significant strike differential in a UFC Lightweight bout (+112) (vs. Nasrat Haqparast)
  - UFC.com Awards
    - 2013: Ranked #6 Import of the Year
    - 2023: Ranked #3 Upset of the Year vs. Grant Dawson, Ranked #4 Upset of the Year vs. Tony Ferguson
- King of the Cage
  - KOTC Lightweight Championship (One time)
  - KOTC Junior Welterweight Championship (One time)
    - One successful title defense
- Total Fight Alliance
  - TFA Lightweight Championship (One time)
- Warriors Fighting Championship
  - WFC 2008 Lightweight Tournament Winner
- MMAjunkie.com
  - 2017 October Fight of the Month vs. Lando Vannata
  - 2020 August Fight of the Month vs. Lando Vannata

=== Amateur wrestling ===
- California Interscholastic Federation
  - CIF All-State (2003, 2004)
  - CIF State Championship Sportsmanship Award (2004)

== Mixed martial arts record ==
Professional record breakdown
56 matches	36 wins	18 losses
By knockout	13	7
By submission	10	3
By decision	13	8
Draws	1	
No contests	1	

Res.	Record	Opponent	Method	Event	Date	Round	Time	Location	Notes
Loss	36–18–1 (1)	Esteban Ribovics	TKO (punches)	UFC 332	October 3, 2026	1	4:08	Salt Lake City, Utah, United States	Catchweight (156.5 lb) bout; Ribovics missed weight.
Win	36–17–1 (1)	Terrance McKinney	TKO (punches)	UFC 329	July 11, 2026	1	4:59	Las Vegas, Nevada, United States	Performance of the Night.
Win	35–17–1 (1)	Jeremy Stephens	Submission (rear-naked choke)	UFC 328	May 9, 2026	1	4:20	Newark, New Jersey, United States	Catchweight (160 lb) bout; Stephens missed weight.
Win	34–17–1 (1)	Daniel Zellhuber	TKO (punches)	UFC Fight Night: Moreno vs. Kavanagh	February 28, 2026	2	4:55	Mexico City, Mexico	
Win	33–17–1 (1)	Lance Gibson Jr.	Decision (split)	UFC on ESPN: Royval vs. Kape	December 13, 2025	3	5:00	Las Vegas, Nevada, United States	Catchweight (160 lb) bout.
Loss	32–17–1 (1)	Maurício Ruffy	KO (spinning wheel kick)	UFC 313	March 8, 2025	1	2:07	Las Vegas, Nevada, United States	
Loss	32–16–1 (1)	Paddy Pimblett	Technical Submission (triangle choke)	UFC 304	July 27, 2024	1	3:22	Manchester, England	
Win	32–15–1 (1)	Jim Miller	Decision (unanimous)	UFC 300	April 13, 2024	3	5:00	Las Vegas, Nevada, United States	
Loss	31–15–1 (1)	Jalin Turner	KO (punches)	UFC on ESPN: Dariush vs. Tsarukyan	December 2, 2023	1	2:49	Austin, Texas, United States	
Win	31–14–1 (1)	Grant Dawson	KO (punches)	UFC Fight Night: Dawson vs. Green	October 7, 2023	1	0:33	Las Vegas, Nevada, United States	Performance of the Night.
Win	30–14–1 (1)	Tony Ferguson	Technical Submission (arm-triangle choke)	UFC 291	July 29, 2023	3	4:54	Salt Lake City, Utah, United States	Performance of the Night.
NC	29–14–1 (1)	Jared Gordon	NC (accidental clash of heads)	UFC Fight Night: Pavlovich vs. Blaydes	April 22, 2023	1	4:35	Las Vegas, Nevada, United States	Accidental clash of heads led to Gordon being knocked unconscious.
Loss	29–14–1	Drew Dober	KO (punch)	UFC Fight Night: Cannonier vs. Strickland	December 17, 2022	2	2:45	Las Vegas, Nevada, United States	Fight of the Night.
Loss	29–13–1	Islam Makhachev	TKO (punches)	UFC Fight Night: Makhachev vs. Green	February 26, 2022	1	3:23	Las Vegas, Nevada, United States	Catchweight (160 lb) bout.
Win	29–12–1	Nasrat Haqparast	Decision (unanimous)	UFC 271	February 12, 2022	3	5:00	Houston, Texas, United States	
Win	28–12–1	Al Iaquinta	TKO (punches)	UFC 268	November 6, 2021	1	2:25	New York City, New York, United States	Performance of the Night.
Loss	27–12–1	Rafael Fiziev	Decision (unanimous)	UFC 265	August 7, 2021	3	5:00	Houston, Texas, United States	Fight of the Night.
Loss	27–11–1	Thiago Moisés	Decision (unanimous)	UFC Fight Night: Hall vs. Silva	October 31, 2020	3	5:00	Las Vegas, Nevada, United States	
Win	27–10–1	Alan Patrick	Decision (unanimous)	UFC Fight Night: Waterson vs. Hill	September 12, 2020	3	5:00	Las Vegas, Nevada, United States	
Win	26–10–1	Lando Vannata	Decision (unanimous)	UFC Fight Night: Brunson vs. Shahbazyan	August 1, 2020	3	5:00	Las Vegas, Nevada, United States	Fight of the Night.
Win	25–10–1	Clay Guida	Decision (unanimous)	UFC on ESPN: Blaydes vs. Volkov	June 20, 2020	3	5:00	Las Vegas, Nevada, United States	
Loss	24–10–1	Francisco Trinaldo	Decision (unanimous)	UFC Fight Night: Błachowicz vs. Jacaré	November 16, 2019	3	5:00	São Paulo, Brazil	
Loss	24–9–1	Drakkar Klose	Decision (unanimous)	UFC on Fox: Lee vs. Iaquinta 2	December 15, 2018	3	5:00	Milwaukee, Wisconsin, United States	
Win	24–8–1	Erik Koch	Decision (unanimous)	UFC on Fox: Jacaré vs. Brunson 2	January 27, 2018	3	5:00	Charlotte, North Carolina, United States	
Draw	23–8–1	Lando Vannata	Draw (split)	UFC 216	October 7, 2017	3	5:00	Las Vegas, Nevada, United States	Vannata was deducted one point in round 1 due to an illegal knee. Fight of the Night.
Loss	23–8	Rashid Magomedov	Decision (split)	UFC on Fox: Johnson vs. Reis	April 15, 2017	3	5:00	Kansas City, Missouri, United States	
Loss	23–7	Dustin Poirier	KO (punches)	UFC 199	June 4, 2016	1	2:53	Inglewood, California, United States	
Loss	23–6	Edson Barboza	Decision (unanimous)	UFC Fight Night: Edgar vs. Swanson	November 22, 2014	3	5:00	Austin, Texas, United States	
Win	23–5	Josh Thomson	Decision (split)	UFC on Fox: Lawler vs. Brown	July 26, 2014	3	5:00	San Jose, California, United States	
Win	22–5	Pat Healy	Decision (unanimous)	UFC on Fox: Johnson vs. Benavidez 2	December 14, 2013	3	5:00	Sacramento, California, United States	
Win	21–5	James Krause	TKO (body kick)	UFC: Fight for the Troops 3	November 6, 2013	1	3:50	Fort Campbell, Kentucky, United States	
Win	20–5	Jacob Volkmann	Submission (rear-naked choke)	UFC 156	February 2, 2013	3	4:25	Las Vegas, Nevada, United States	Submission of the Night.
Win	19–5	Matt Ricehouse	Decision (unanimous)	Strikeforce: Rousey vs. Kaufman	August 18, 2012	3	5:00	San Diego, California, United States	
Win	18–5	James Terry	Decision (split)	Strikeforce: Barnett vs. Cormier	May 19, 2012	3	5:00	San Jose, California, United States	
Win	17–5	J. P. Reese	Submission (rear-naked choke)	Strikeforce Challengers: Britt vs. Sayers	November 18, 2011	3	2:25	Las Vegas, Nevada, United States	
Win	16–5	Charon Spain	Submission (arm-triangle choke)	Strikeforce Challengers: Larkin vs. Rossborough	September 23, 2011	2	2:54	Las Vegas, Nevada, United States	
Loss	15–5	Gesias Cavalcante	Decision (split)	Strikeforce: Fedor vs. Henderson	July 30, 2011	3	5:00	Hoffman Estates, Illinois, United States	
Win	15–4	Dom O'Grady	Decision (unanimous)	KOTC: Moral Victory	April 21, 2011	5	5:00	Highland, California, United States	Won the KOTC Lightweight Championship.
Loss	14–4	Tim Means	TKO (retirement)	KOTC: Inferno	October 7, 2010	2	5:00	Highland, California, United States	Lost the KOTC Light Welterweight Championship.
Win	14–3	Daron Cruickshank	Submission (guillotine choke)	KOTC: Imminent Danger	August 13, 2010	2	2:39	Mescalero, New Mexico, United States	Defended the KOTC Light Welterweight Championship.
Win	13–3	Ricky Legere	TKO (punches)	KOTC: Arrival	February 25, 2010	1	4:27	Highland, California, United States	Won the KOTC Light Welterweight Championship.
Win	12–3	Charles Bennett	KO (punches)	KOTC: Fight 4 Hope	December 17, 2009	1	2:17	Highland, California, United States	
Loss	11–3	David Mitchell	Submission (toe hold)	Tachi Palace Fights 2	December 3, 2009	1	0:54	Lemoore, California, United States	Welterweight bout.
Win	11–2	Sevak Magakian	TKO (punches)	Respect in the Cage 2	November 20, 2009	1	2:24	Pomona, California, United States	
Win	10–2	Jeff Torch	TKO (submission to punches)	KOTC: Jolted	October 3, 2009	1	1:29	Laughlin, Nevada, United States	
Win	9–2	John Ulloa	Submission (armbar)	KOTC: Immortal	February 27, 2009	1	N/A	San Bernardino, California, United States	
Loss	8–2	Dan Lauzon	Submission (rear-naked choke)	Affliction: Day of Reckoning	January 24, 2009	1	4:55	Anaheim, California, United States	
Win	8–1	Toby Grear	TKO (punches)	Total Fighting Alliance 11	July 12, 2008	2	3:25	Long Beach, California, United States	Won the TFA Lightweight Championship.
Win	7–1	Rafael Salomao	TKO (punches)	Warriors FC 1	June 28, 2008	1	4:10	Mexico City, Mexico	Won the Warriors FC Lightweight Tournament.
Win	6–1	Israel Giron	KO (punches)	Warriors FC 1	June 28, 2008	1	2:47	Mexico City, Mexico	Warriors FC Lightweight Tournament Semifinal.
Win	5–1	Santiago Manzanares	Decision (split)	Warriors FC 1	June 28, 2008	3	3:00	Mexico City, Mexico	Warriors FC Lightweight Tournament Quarterfinal.
Win	4–1	Raymond Ayala	Submission (guillotine choke)	Total Fighting Alliance 10	March 22, 2008	2	1:59	Santa Monica, California, United States	Return to Lightweight.
Win	3–1	Herman Terrado	Submission (guillotine choke)	Cage of Fire 11	March 8, 2008	3	1:28	Tijuana, Mexico	Welterweight debut.
Loss	2–1	Josh Gaskins	Decision (unanimous)	Valor Fighting: Fight Night	March 7, 2008	3	3:00	Tustin, California, United States	
Win	2–0	Henry Briones	Submission (guillotine choke)	Ultimate Challenge Mexico 5	February 23, 2008	1	0:48	Tijuana, Mexico	
Win	1–0	Neal Abrams	KO (punches)	Total Fighting Alliance 9	January 19, 2008	3	1:12	Santa Monica, California, United States	Lightweight debut.

== See also ==
- List of current UFC fighters
- List of male mixed martial artists
