= J.P. Reese =

American mixed martial arts fighter

- Born: James Patrick Reese; December 21, 1980 (age 45); Livonia, Michigan, United States
- Height: 5 ft 9 in (1.75 m)
- Weight: 145 lb (66 kg; 10.4 st)
- Division: Featherweight, Lightweight
- Fighting out of: Rochester Hills, Michigan, United States
- Team: American Top Team
- Rank: NCAA Division I Wrestler
- Years active: 2010-present

Mixed martial arts record
- Total: 21
- Wins: 11
- By knockout: 3
- By submission: 2
- By decision: 6
- Losses: 10
- By knockout: 1
- By submission: 6
- By decision: 3

Other information
- Website: http://www.jpreese.com
- Mixed martial arts record from Sherdog

James Patrick Reese (born December 21, 1980) is an American mixed martial artist. He bases his training at American Top Team in Coconut Creek, Florida.

== Amateur wrestling career ==
J.P. Reese began wrestling at Rochester Adams High School in Rochester Hills, Michigan. He was a two-time state place winner (sixth place – 1998 and third place – 1999) along with helping his team to a state championship in 1998 and a runner-up finish in 1999. He finished his senior year with a 57–1 record.

Reese went on to wrestle for the University of Missouri and started all four years. He became a two-time NCAA Wrestling Championships qualifier (2002 and 2003). He obtained All-American honors at the University Nationals in Freestyle Wrestling in 2002. J.P. stands second all-time in career pins for the Mizzou Wrestling team (47) behind Ben Askren. He graduated from Missouri with a B.A. in Business Management in 2004.

J.P. was a 2006 beach wrestling National Champion and a 2007 Beach Wrestling World team member, competing at the World Beach Wrestling Championships in Antalya, Turkey.

== Mixed martial arts career ==
=== Early career ===
Reese made his MMA debut June 19, 2010 in Miami, Florida. He won the fight by TKO in the second round.

He subsequently fought twice for Bellator Fighting Championships in Florida. He has quickly amassed a record of 5 wins and 1 loss in the first 15 months of his MMA career.

=== Strikeforce ===
Reese made his Strikeforce debut on November 18, 2011, at Strikeforce Challengers: Britt vs. Sayers as a late replacement for Isaac Vallie-Flagg against Bobby Green. He lost the fight via submission in the third round.

== Mixed martial arts record ==
Professional record breakdown
| 21 matches | 11 wins | 10 losses |
| By knockout | 3 | 1 |
| By submission | 2 | 6 |
| By decision | 6 | 3 |

| Res. | Record | Opponent | Method | Event | Date | Round | Time | Location | Notes |
|---|---|---|---|---|---|---|---|---|---|
| Loss | 11–10 | Alejandro Solano Rodriguez | Submission (guillotine choke) | CP: Calvo Promotions 3 | October 1, 2014 | 3 | 2:57 | San Jose, Costa Rica | |
| Loss | 11–9 | Jason Soares | Submission (rear-naked choke) | Fight Time 19 | May 30, 2014 | 3 | 3:57 | Fort Lauderdale, Florida, United States | |
| Loss | 11–8 | Arman Ospanov | Submission (triangle choke) | IADF - International Association Diamond Fight | March 22, 2014 | 1 | 3:33 | Almaty, Kazakhstan | |
| Win | 11–7 | Daniel Swain | Submission (arm-triangle choke) | XFC 27: Frozen Fury | December 13, 2013 | 3 | 3:37 | Muskegon, Michigan, United States | Featherweight bout. |
| Win | 10–7 | Billy Quarantillo | Decision (unanimous) | Real Fighting Championships 29 | November 8, 2013 | 3 | 5:00 | Tampa, Florida, United States | |
| Loss | 9–7 | Lando Vannata | Decision (split) | XFC 25: Boiling Point | September 6, 2013 | 3 | 5:00 | Albuquerque, New Mexico, United States | |
| Loss | 9–6 | Julian Lane | Submission (guillotine choke) | Fight Time 15: It's Fight Time! | June 21, 2013 | 1 | 2:45 | Fort Lauderdale, Florida, United States | |
| Loss | 9–5 | Vagner Rocha | Submission (rear-naked choke) | Fight Time 14: This Means War! | April 26, 2013 | 5 | 2:18 | Fort Lauderdale, Florida, United States | Fight Time Promotions and ISKA Lightweight Championship bout. |
| Win | 9–4 | David Shepherd | Decision (unanimous) | Bellator 87 | January 31, 2013 | 3 | 5:00 | Mount Pleasant, Michigan, United States | |
| Loss | 8–4 | Kevin Lee | Decision (unanimous) | IFL 51 No Guts No Glory | November 17, 2012 | 3 | 5:00 | Auburn Hills, Michigan, United States | |
| Win | 8–3 | Paulo Durao | Submission (D'arce choke) | WCMMA 1: USA vs Portugal | September 15, 2012 | 2 | 2:02 | Mashantucket, Connecticut, United States | |
| Loss | 7–3 | Sevak Magakian | Decision (unanimous) | SHOFight MMA 20 | June 16, 2012 | 3 | 5:00 | Springfield, Missouri, United States | |
| Win | 7–2 | Eric Thompson | Decision (split) | Prestige Fights 6: Bayou Brawl | June 1, 2012 | 3 | 5:00 | New Orleans, Louisiana, United States | 176 lbs. catchweight bout. |
| Win | 6–2 | Brad Wheeler | Decision (unanimous) | Cage Warriors: 45 | February 18, 2012 | 3 | 5:00 | North London, England | |
| Loss | 5–2 | Bobby Green | Submission (rear-naked choke) | Strikeforce Challengers: Britt vs. Sayers | November 18, 2011 | 3 | 2:25 | Las Vegas, Nevada, United States | |
| Win | 5–1 | Martin Brown | Decision (unanimous) | Bellator 50 | September 17, 2011 | 3 | 5:00 | Hollywood, Florida, United States | |
| Win | 4–1 | Aaron Aschendorf | Decision (unanimous) | Fight Time 6: Pride and Glory | August 19, 2011 | 3 | 5:00 | Fort Lauderdale, Florida, United States | |
| Win | 3–1 | Jason Valle | TKO (punches) | Championship Fighting Alliance: The Title | May 6, 2011 | 2 | 1:31 | Miami, Florida, United States | |
| Loss | 2–1 | Kamrin Naville | TKO (cut) | RRMC: RadRok MMA Championship | January 21, 2011 | 1 | 5:00 | Coral Springs, Florida, United States | |
| Win | 2–0 | Bounmy Somchay | TKO (punches) | Bellator 34 | October 28, 2010 | 1 | 3:32 | Hollywood, Florida, United States | |
| Win | 1–0 | Johonner Correa | TKO (punches) | Elite Promotions: Battle at the Beach | June 19, 2010 | 2 | 1:45 | Miami, Florida, United States | |
