= Sam Sicilia =

American mixed martial arts fighter (born 1986)

- Born: Samuel Travis Sicilia; February 1, 1986 (age 40); Spokane, Washington, United States
- Nationality: American
- Height: 5 ft 8 in (1.73 m)
- Weight: 146 lb (66 kg; 10.4 st)
- Division: Lightweight; Featherweight
- Reach: 67 in (170 cm)
- Fighting out of: Spokane, Washington, United States
- Team: Sikjitsu
- Years active: 2007–present

Mixed martial arts record
- Total: 29
- Wins: 18
- By knockout: 9
- By submission: 4
- By decision: 5
- Losses: 11
- By knockout: 3
- By submission: 6
- By decision: 2

Other information
- Mixed martial arts record from Sherdog

Samuel Travis Sicilia (born February 1, 1986) is an American professional mixed martial artist who currently competes in the featherweight division for Bellator MMA. A professional competitor since 2007, Sicilia formerly competed for the UFC, and was on FX's The Ultimate Fighter: Live.

== Background ==
Born and raised in Spokane, Washington, Sicilia competed in wrestling at Mt. Spokane High School and now works as an assistant coach for the team.

== Mixed martial arts career ==
=== Early career ===
Sicilia began training in MMA in 2007, taking his first amateur fights late in the year and amassed a 4–1 record before turning professional shortly after. Following his first professional win he took a nearly four-year break from fighting. He then returned in 2011, and went 9–1 fighting for several regional promotions in the Northwestern United States.

=== The Ultimate Fighter ===
In February 2012, it was revealed that Sicilia was selected to be a participant on The Ultimate Fighter: Live. Sicilia defeated Dominick Cruz training partner, Erin Beach, via an eight-second KO to move into the Ultimate Fighter house, and become an official cast member.

Sicilia was selected as the second pick (third overall) by Dominick Cruz to take part on Team Cruz. In the first round of the tournament, Sicilia was selected to fight former Bellator Fighting Championships fighter, Chris Saunders. Sicilia lost the fight via split decision after two rounds. The decision was heavily disputed by many, including UFC president Dana White who claimed, "I think Sicilia got robbed of the opportunity of going to a third round, though. But great fight."

=== Ultimate Fighting Championship ===
Sicilia made his UFC debut at The Ultimate Fighter 15 Finale on June 1, 2012, in Las Vegas, Nevada, against TUF castmate, Cristiano Marcello. He won the fight via KO in the second round. After the win Sicilia expressed interest in returning to the featherweight division.

Sicilia dropped to the featherweight division and faced Rony Jason on October 13, 2012, at UFC 153. Sicilia lost via second-round TKO due to punches.

Sicilia next face Maximo Blanco on April 13, 2013, at The Ultimate Fighter 17 Finale. He lost the fight via unanimous decision.

Sicilia was expected to face Godofredo Pepey on September 4, 2013, at UFC Fight Night 28. However, Pepey pulled out of the bout citing an injury and was replaced by Felipe Arantes. Subsequently, Sicilia also pulled out of the bout for undisclosed reasons and was replaced by Kevin Souza.

The bout with Pepey eventually took place on November 9, 2013, at UFC Fight Night 32. Sicilia won the fight via TKO in the first round.

Sicilia faced Cole Miller on January 15, 2014, at UFC Fight Night 35. He lost the fight via submission in the second round.

Sicilia was expected to face promotional newcomer Doo Ho Choi on May 24, 2014, at UFC 173. However, Choi pulled out of the bout citing an injury. Sicilia instead faced promotional newcomer Aaron Phillips. He won the fight via unanimous decision.

Sicilia faced Katsunori Kikuno at UFC Fight Night 52 on September 20, 2014. He lost the fight via submission in the second round.

Sicilia next fought Akira Corassani on January 24, 2015, at UFC on Fox 14. Sicilia won the fight via KO in the first round.

A rescheduled bout with Doo Ho Choi was expected to take place on July 15, 2015, at UFC Fight Night 71. However, Choi pulled out of the fight in late June for undisclosed reasons and was replaced by Yaotzin Meza. Sicilia won the fight by unanimous decision.

A bout with Choi was scheduled a third time and took place on November 21, 2015, at UFC Fight Night 79. Sicilia lost the bout via TKO in the first round.

Sicilia next faced Gabriel Benítez on September 17, 2016, at UFC Fight Night 94. He lost the fight via submission in the second round.

Sicilia faced promotional newcomer Gavin Tucker on February 19, 2017, at UFC Fight Night 105. He lost the fight via unanimous decision.

In May 2017, Sicilia was released from the company.

=== Bellator MMA ===
On August 17, 2017, it was announced that Sicilia signed with Bellator MMA.

Sicilia faced former Bellator champion Marcos Galvão at Bellator 189 on December 1, 2017. He won the fight by unanimous decision.

In his second fight for the promotion, Sicilia faced Emmanuel Sanchez at Bellator 198 on April 28, 2018. He lost the fight via arm-triangle choke submission in the first round.

In his third fight for the promotion, Sicilia faced Derek Campos at Bellator 212 on December 14, 2018. He won the back-and-forth fight by split decision.

In April 2019, news surfaced that Sicilia had signed a new exclusive, multi-fight contract with Bellator.

==== Bellator Featherweight grand prix ====
In the initial round of Bellator's Featherweight GP, Sicilia lost to Pedro Carvalho at Bellator 226 due to a Face crank on September 7, 2019.

==== Post-GP ====
Sicilia faced Robert Whiteford at Bellator London 2 on November 23, 2019. Despite dropping Whiteford multiple times during the bout, Whiteford came back and knocked Sicilia out with only six seconds left in the final round.

== Film and television ==
Sicilia was featured in the award-winning mixed martial arts documentary Fight Life, the film is directed by James Z. Feng and released in 2013.

Sam and his wife Lyndsie have a daughter, Sienna Noel who was born on July 4, 2018.

== Mixed martial arts record ==
Professional record breakdown
29 matches	18 wins	11 losses
By knockout	9	3
By submission	4	6
By decision	5	2

Res.	Record	Opponent	Method	Event	Date	Round	Time	Location	Notes
Win	18–11	Talon Hoffman	KO	ExciteFight: Conquest of the Cage	August 26, 2021	3	1:18	Spokane, Washington, United States	
Loss	17–11	Robert Whiteford	KO (punches)	Bellator London 2	November 23, 2019	3	4:54	London, England	
Loss	17–10	Pedro Carvalho	Submission (face crank)	Bellator 226	September 7, 2019	2	1:56	San Jose, California, United States	Bellator Featherweight World Grand Prix Opening Round.
Win	17–9	Derek Campos	Decision (split)	Bellator 212	December 14, 2018	3	5:00	Honolulu, Hawaii, United States	
Loss	16–9	Emmanuel Sanchez	Submission (arm-triangle choke)	Bellator 198	April 28, 2018	1	3:52	Rosemont, Illinois, United States	
Win	16–8	Marcos Galvão	Decision (unanimous)	Bellator 189	December 1, 2017	3	5:00	Thackerville, Oklahoma, United States	
Loss	15–8	Gavin Tucker	Decision (unanimous)	UFC Fight Night: Lewis vs. Browne	February 19, 2017	3	5:00	Halifax, Nova Scotia, Canada	
Loss	15–7	Gabriel Benítez	Technical Submission (guillotine choke)	UFC Fight Night: Poirier vs. Johnson	September 17, 2016	2	1:20	Hidalgo, Texas, United States	
Loss	15–6	Choi Doo-ho	KO (punches)	UFC Fight Night: Henderson vs. Masvidal	November 28, 2015	1	1:33	Seoul, South Korea	
Win	15–5	Yaotzin Meza	Decision (unanimous)	UFC Fight Night: Mir vs. Duffee	July 15, 2015	3	5:00	San Diego, California, United States	
Win	14–5	Akira Corassani	KO (punch)	UFC on Fox: Gustafsson vs. Johnson	January 24, 2015	1	3:26	Stockholm, Sweden	
Loss	13–5	Katsunori Kikuno	Submission (rear-naked choke)	UFC Fight Night: Hunt vs. Nelson	September 20, 2014	2	1:38	Saitama, Japan	
Win	13–4	Aaron Phillips	Decision (unanimous)	UFC 173	May 24, 2014	3	5:00	Las Vegas, Nevada, United States	
Loss	12–4	Cole Miller	Submission (rear-naked choke)	UFC Fight Night: Rockhold vs. Philippou	January 15, 2014	2	1:54	Duluth, Georgia, United States	
Win	12–3	Godofredo Pepey	TKO (punches)	UFC Fight Night: Belfort vs. Henderson	November 9, 2013	1	1:42	Goiânia, Brazil	
Loss	11–3	Maximo Blanco	Decision (unanimous)	The Ultimate Fighter: Team Jones vs. Team Sonnen Finale	April 13, 2013	3	5:00	Las Vegas, Nevada, United States	
Loss	11–2	Rony Jason	TKO (punches)	UFC 153	October 13, 2012	2	4:16	Rio de Janeiro, Brazil	Featherweight debut.
Win	11–1	Cristiano Marcello	KO (knees and punches)	The Ultimate Fighter: Live Finale	June 1, 2012	2	2:53	Las Vegas, Nevada, United States	
Win	10–1	Arley George	KO (punch)	Conquest of the Cage 10	December 15, 2011	1	0:25	Airway Heights, Washington, United States	
Win	9–1	Jared Haller	TKO (punches)	Caged Conflict	November 12, 2011	1	0:25	Canyonville, Oregon, United States	
Win	8–1	Josiah Mitchell	KO (punch)	CageSport 16	October 1, 2011	1	0:29	Tacoma, Washington, United States	
Win	7–1	Dominic Rivera	Submission (rear-naked choke)	Fight Night Round 16	August 13, 2011	1	2:38	Anacortes, Washington, United States	
Win	6–1	Josh Snodgrass	Submission (rear-naked choke)	Caged Combat 4	July 29, 2011	1	1:48	Grand Ronde, Oregon, United States	
Win	5–1	Angel Diaz	KO (punch)	Lords of the Cage 7	July 16, 2011	1	3:35	Manson, Washington, United States	
Loss	4–1	Daniel Swain	Submission (rear-naked choke)	Lords of the Cage 6	June 10, 2011	1	2:37	Yakima, Washington, United States	
Win	4–0	Charon Spain	Submission (neck crank)	Lords of the Cage 5	April 28, 2011	1	4:03	Airway Heights, Washington, United States	
Win	3–0	Marc Forsyth	Submission (rear-naked choke)	Rumble on the Ridge 17	March 5, 2011	2	4:07	Snoqualmie, Washington, United States	
Win	2–0	Jason Gybels	KO (punches)	Rumble on the Ridge 16	January 15, 2011	1	2:54	Snoqualmie, Washington, United States	Lightweight debut.
Win	1–0	Brian Clayton	Decision (unanimous)	Combat Caged Warriors 4	September 15, 2007	3	5:00	Tri-Cities, Washington, United States	Catchweight (150 lb) bout.

== Mixed martial arts exhibition record ==
Professional record breakdown
2 matches	1 win	1 loss
By knockout	1	0
By submission	0	0
By decision	0	1

Res.	Record	Opponent	Method	Event	Date	Round	Time	Location	Notes
Loss	1–1	Chris Saunders	Decision (split)	The Ultimate Fighter: Live	April 27, 2012	2	5:00	Las Vegas, Nevada, United States	
Win	1–0	Erin Beach	KO (punch)	The Ultimate Fighter: Live	March 9, 2012	1	0:08	Las Vegas, Nevada, United States	

== See also ==
- List of current Bellator fighters
- List of male mixed martial artists
