= UFC on Fox: Johnson vs. Benavidez 2 =

UFC mixed martial arts event in 2013

- The poster for UFC on Fox: Johnson vs. Benavidez 2
- Promotion: Ultimate Fighting Championship
- Date: December 14, 2013
- Venue: Sleep Train Arena
- City: Sacramento, California
- Attendance: 11,573
- Total gate: $1,066,610

Event chronology
UFC Fight Night: Hunt vs. Bigfoot	UFC on Fox: Johnson vs. Benavidez 2	UFC 168: Weidman vs. Silva 2

UFC on Fox: Johnson vs. Benavidez 2 (also known as UFC on Fox 9) was a mixed martial arts event held on December 14, 2013, at the Sleep Train Arena in Sacramento, California. It was the UFC's third visit to the venue, after UFC 65 and UFC 73.

== Background ==
A UFC Lightweight title bout between the former champion Anthony Pettis and former top contender T. J. Grant was targeted for this event. However, Grant revealed in mid-September that he has yet to be medically cleared after suffering a concussion in training and would not be eligible to compete on December 14 and opted to decline the bout. Pettis was then expected to face Josh Thomson in the event headliner. However, on November 10, 2013, it was announced that Pettis was injured and the bout was cancelled. The new main event was a rematch for the Flyweight title between Demetrious Johnson and Joseph Benavidez.

Co-featured on the card was a bout between top bantamweight contenders Urijah Faber and Michael McDonald.

Ian McCall was expected to face Scott Jorgensen at the event. However, McCall was forced out of the bout with an injury and replaced by John Dodson. Then on December 3, Dodson himself was forced from the bout after sustaining a knee injury. Jorgensen instead faced former Bellator Bantamweight Champion Zach Makovsky.

Jamie Varner was expected to face Pat Healy at this event. However, Varner pulled out of the bout due to injury and was replaced by Bobby Green

Kelvin Gastelum was expected to face Court McGee at this event. However, Gastelum pulled out of the bout, citing an undisclosed injury and was replaced by Ryan LaFlare.

John Moraga was expected to face Darren Uyenoyama at the event. However, Moraga pulled out of the bout with an undisclosed injury and was replaced by promotional newcomer Alp Ozkilic.

Carlos Condit was expected to face Matt Brown in a welterweight bout on the main card. However, on December 7, 2013, it was announced that Brown had to pull out of the bout due to herniated discs in his back. Sources close to the promotion on Saturday, December 7, 2013, told MMAjunkie no replacement was sought to meet Condit on the card, thus removing the fight entirely from the event.

This was the first MMA event held at the Sleep Train Arena since WEC 48 on April 24, 2010, where Johnson, Faber, Mendes and Jorgensen also fought. Faber headlined or co-headlined each of the arena's previous four MMA events.

== Results ==
Main Card (Fox)
Weight class				Method	Round	Time	Notes
Flyweight	Demetrious Johnson (c)	def.	Joseph Benavidez	KO (punch)	1	2:08	(Note: For the UFC Flyweight Championship)
Bantamweight	Urijah Faber	def.	Michael McDonald	Submission (guillotine choke)	2	3:22
Featherweight	Chad Mendes	def.	Nik Lentz	Decision (unanimous) (30–27, 30–27, 29–28)	3	5:00
Lightweight	Joe Lauzon	def.	Mac Danzig	Decision (unanimous) (30–27, 30–27, 30–27)	3	5:00
Preliminary card (Fox Sports 1)
Welterweight	Ryan LaFlare	def.	Court McGee	Decision (unanimous) (29–28, 29–28, 29–28)	3	5:00
Lightweight	Edson Barboza	def.	Danny Castillo	Decision (majority) (29–28, 29–28, 28–28)	3	5:00
Lightweight	Bobby Green	def.	Pat Healy	Decision (unanimous) (30–27, 30–27, 29–28)	3	5:00
Flyweight	Zach Makovsky	def.	Scott Jorgensen	Decision (unanimous) (30–27, 30–27, 30–27)	3	5:00
Lightweight	Sam Stout	def.	Cody McKenzie	Decision (unanimous) (30–27, 30–27, 30–27)	3	5:00
Lightweight	Abel Trujillo	def.	Roger Bowling	TKO (punches)	2	1:35
Preliminary card (Online)
Flyweight	Alp Ozkilic	def.	Darren Uyenoyama	Decision (split) (30–27, 28–29, 29–28)	3	5:00

== Bonus awards ==
The following fighters received $50,000 bonuses.

- Fight of The Night: Edson Barboza vs. Danny Castillo
- Knockout of The Night: Demetrious Johnson
- Submission of the Night: Urijah Faber

== Reported payout ==
The following is the reported payout to the fighters as reported to the California State Athletic Commission. It does not include sponsor money or "locker room" bonuses often given by the UFC and also do not include the UFC's traditional "fight night" bonuses.

- Demetrious Johnson: $175,000 ($50,000 win bonus) def. Joseph Benavidez: $42,000
- Urijah Faber: $200,000 ($100,000 win bonus) def. Michael McDonald: $17,000
- Chad Mendes: $90,000 ($45,000 win bonus) def. Nik Lentz: $29,000
- Joe Lauzon: $60,000 ($30,000 win bonus) def. Mac Danzig: $32,000
- Ryan LaFlare: $20,000 ($10,000 win bonus) def. Court McGee: $10,000
- Edson Barboza: $52,000 ($26,000 win bonus) def. Danny Castillo: $31,000
- Bobby Green: $36,000 ($18,000 win bonus) def. Pat Healy: $25,000
- Zach Makovsky: $20,000 ($10,000 win bonus) def. Scott Jorgensen: $26,000
- Sam Stout: $60,000 ($30,000 win bonus) def. Cody McKenzie: $12,000
- Abel Trujillo: $20,000 ($10,000 win bonus) def. Roger Bowling: $12,000
- Alptekin Ozkilic: $16,000 ($8,000 win bonus) def. Darren Uyenoyama: $12,000

== See also ==
- List of UFC events
- 2013 in UFC
