= Andrew Craig =

American mixed martial arts fighter

- Born: Andrew Brendan Craig; January 15, 1986 (age 40); Houston, Texas, United States
- Other names: Highlight
- Height: 6 ft 1 in (1.85 m)
- Weight: 171 lb (78 kg; 12.2 st)
- Division: Middleweight; Welterweight
- Reach: 76 in (193 cm)
- Stance: Orthodox
- Fighting out of: Houston, Texas, United States
- Team: Team Tooke
- Rank: Black belt in Brazilian Jiu-Jitsu under Travis Tooke
- Years active: 2010–2015

Mixed martial arts record
- Total: 13
- Wins: 9
- By knockout: 3
- By submission: 1
- By decision: 5
- Losses: 4
- By knockout: 1
- By submission: 1
- By decision: 2

Other information
- Mixed martial arts record from Sherdog

Andrew Brandon Craig (born January 15, 1986) is an American mixed martial artist who most recently competed in the Welterweight division of the Ultimate Fighting Championship. A professional competitor since 2010, he has also competed for Bellator.

== Background ==
Craig is from Houston, Texas, and grew up playing mainly football, but dabbled with a bunch of other sports too. He started football in the third grade, and played as running back. He graduated Stratford High School (Houston) before going to college at the University of Texas where he earned a degree in corporate communications. Craig began learning Brazilian jiu-jitsu from his cousin – Travis Tooke – who was already a black belt in the martial art. Without any other martial art background, Craig started training mixed martial arts as a college freshman. After graduating college, Craig began his career as a professional MMA fighter.

== Mixed martial arts career ==
=== Early career ===
Craig made his professional debut in May 2010 for USA MMA winning his first fight via unanimous decision. His second fight was held at Bellator 27 against Rodrigo Pinheiro. Craig won the fight after the cageside doctor ruled Pinheiro unable to continue. Craig won two fights under the International Xtreme Fight Association banner before signing with the Texas-based promotion Legacy Fighting Championships.

=== Legacy Fighting Championships ===
Craig made his Legacy Fighting Championships debut on April 9, 2011, against William Bush for the Legacy Fighting middleweight title. In the fifth and final round, Craig won the fight via TKO.

Craig was set to make his first title defense at Legacy Fighting 8 against Bellator and WEC veteran, Eric Schambari. However, Schambari weighed in past the middleweight limit and the fight became a three round non-title fight. Craig won the fight via unanimous decision.

=== Ultimate Fighting Championship ===
Craig made his UFC debut on short notice as an injury replacement for Jared Hamman against Australian Kyle Noke on March 3, 2012, at UFC on FX 2. Despite losing the first round, Craig came back to dominate the second and third rounds, winning via unanimous decision.

Craig defeated Rafael Natal on July 11, 2012, at UFC on Fuel TV: Munoz vs. Weidman. After being rocked and controlled for the majority of the second round, Craig landed a head kick to capture a comeback knockout victory.

In his third fight for the promotion, Craig faced Ronny Markes on January 19, 2013, at UFC on FX 7. He lost the fight via unanimous decision. It was the first loss of his professional career.

Craig defeated former WEC Middleweight Champion Chris Leben via split decision on July 6, 2013, at UFC 162.

Craig took on English fighter Luke Barnatt in his next outing on October 26, 2013, at UFC Fight Night 30. He lost the fight via submission in the second round. Despite the loss on his record, the fight also earned Craig his first Fight of the Night bonus award.

Craig was expected to face Chris Camozzi on April 11, 2014, at UFC Fight Night 39. However, the fight was cancelled on the day of the weigh-ins as Craig was ruled out with an illness.

Craig faced Cezar Ferreira on June 28, 2014, at UFC Fight Night: Swanson vs. Stephens. He lost the fight via unanimous decision.

Craig was expected to face Edgar Garcia in a welterweight bout on July 15, 2015, at UFC Fight Night 71. However, Garcia was forced from the bout with injury and replaced by promotional newcomer Lyman Good. Craig lost the fight via TKO in the second round and was subsequently released from the promotion following the loss.

== Personal life ==
Craig works as the head MMA coach at 10th Planet Austin and Director of Partnership Development for UFC Vet Tim Kennedy.

== Championships and accomplishments ==
- Legacy Fighting Championship
  - Legacy FC Middleweight Championship (One time)
- Ultimate Fighting Championship
  - Fight of the Night (One time) vs. Luke Barnatt

== Mixed martial arts record ==
Professional record breakdown
13 matches	9 wins	4 losses
By knockout	3	1
By submission	1	1
By decision	5	2

Res.	Record	Opponent	Method	Event	Date	Round	Time	Location	Notes
Loss	9–4	Lyman Good	KO (punches)	UFC Fight Night: Mir vs. Duffee	July 15, 2015	2	3:37	San Diego, California, United States	Welterweight debut.
Loss	9–3	Cezar Ferreira	Decision (unanimous)	UFC Fight Night: Swanson vs. Stephens	June 28, 2014	3	5:00	San Antonio, Texas, United States	
Loss	9–2	Luke Barnatt	Submission (rear-naked choke)	UFC Fight Night: Machida vs. Munoz	October 26, 2013	2	2:12	Manchester, England	Fight of the Night.
Win	9–1	Chris Leben	Decision (split)	UFC 162	July 6, 2013	3	5:00	Las Vegas, Nevada, United States	
Loss	8–1	Ronny Markes	Decision (unanimous)	UFC on FX: Belfort vs. Bisping	January 19, 2013	3	5:00	São Paulo, Brazil	
Win	8–0	Rafael Natal	KO (head kick)	UFC on Fuel TV: Munoz vs. Weidman	July 11, 2012	2	4:52	San Jose, California, United States	
Win	7–0	Kyle Noke	Decision (unanimous)	UFC on FX: Alves vs. Kampmann	March 3, 2012	3	5:00	Sydney, Australia	
Win	6–0	Eric Schambari	Decision (unanimous)	Legacy FC 8	September 16, 2011	3	5:00	Houston, Texas, United States	Schambari missed weight; non-title bout
Win	5–0	William Bush	TKO (punches)	Legacy FC 6	April 9, 2011	5	2:47	Houston, Texas, United States	Won the Legacy FC Middleweight Championship.
Win	4–0	Jon Kirk	Submission (triangle choke)	IXFA 5	February 26, 2011	2	1:04	Houston, Texas, United States	
Win	3–0	Josh Foster	Decision (unanimous)	IXFA 4	December 4, 2010	3	3:00	Houston, Texas, United States	
Win	2–0	Rodrigo Pinheiro	TKO (doctor stoppage)	Bellator 27	September 2, 2010	3	2:53	San Antonio, Texas, United States	
Win	1–0	Antuan Williams	Decision (unanimous)	USA MMA 12	May 22, 2010	3	5:00	Kinder, Louisiana, United States	

== See also ==
- List of current UFC fighters
- List of male mixed martial artists
