= Yaotzin Meza =

American mixed martial arts fighter (born 1981)

- Born: February 4, 1981 (age 45); Santa Ana, California, United States
- Height: 5 ft 9 in (1.75 m)
- Weight: 145 lb (66 kg; 10 st 5 lb)
- Division: Bantamweight; Featherweight
- Reach: 71 in (180 cm)
- Fighting out of: Glendale, Arizona, United States
- Team: MMA Lab
- Years active: 2006-2018

Mixed martial arts record
- Total: 34
- Wins: 22
- By knockout: 5
- By submission: 8
- By decision: 9
- Losses: 11
- By knockout: 3
- By submission: 3
- By decision: 5
- No contests: 1

Other information
- Mixed martial arts record from Sherdog

Yaotzin Meza (born February 4, 1981) is an American former mixed martial artist who is best known for competing in the bantamweight and featherweight divisions of the Ultimate Fighting Championship.

== Background ==
Meza went to Flagstaff High School where he participated in wrestling, achieving 3rd place at the Arizona state wrestling championships his senior year.

== MMA career ==
Meza turned pro on April 29, 2006, losing by submission to Kyle Brees at RITC 81. Meza lost his next two bouts both to Amos Sotelo. Meza then won his next 8 fights before losing to Stephane Vigneault at TKO 34.

=== Ultimate Fighting Championship ===
Meza made his promotional debut at UFC on FX 6 filling in for the injured Hacran Dias against Chad Mendes. he lost via KO in the first round.

Meza made his second UFC appearance at bantamweight against TUF alum John Albert at UFC on Fox 8. After surviving a dangerous armbar early in the fight, Meza was able to submit Albert in the second round with a rear-naked choke.

Meza faced Chico Camus on January 25, 2014, at UFC on Fox 10. Originally, he lost the fight via unanimous decision (30–27, 29–28, 29–28) but the result was overturned after Camus failed a post fight drug test.

Meza faced Sergio Pettis on June 7, 2014, at UFC Fight Night 42. He lost the fight via unanimous decision.

Meza faced promotional newcomer Damian Stasiak in a featherweight bout on April 11, 2015, at UFC Fight Night 64. Meza won the back and forth fight by unanimous decision.

Meza faced Sam Sicilia on July 15, 2015, at UFC Fight Night 71, replacing Doo Ho Choi. He lost the fight by unanimous decision.

Meza faced Arnold Allen on February 27, 2016, at UFC Fight Night 84. He lost the fight by unanimous decision.

=== Post-UFC career and retirement ===
Over two years after getting cut from the UFC, Meza faced Gilberto Aguilar at Combate Americas 24 on September 15, 2018. Meza won the fight via rear-naked choke in the first round and retired from the sport.

== Mixed martial arts record ==
Professional record breakdown
33 matches	21 wins	11 losses
By knockout	5	3
By submission	7	3
By decision	9	5
No contests	1	

Res.	Record	Opponent	Method	Event	Date	Round	Time	Location	Notes
Win	22–11 (1)	Gilberto Aguilar	Submission (rear-naked choke)	Combate Americas 24	September 15, 2018	1	3:58	Phoenix, Arizona, United States	
Loss	21–11 (1)	Arnold Allen	Decision (unanimous)	UFC Fight Night: Silva vs. Bisping	February 27, 2016	3	5:00	London, England	
Loss	21–10 (1)	Sam Sicilia	Decision (unanimous)	UFC Fight Night: Mir vs. Duffee	July 15, 2015	3	5:00	San Diego, California, United States	
Win	21–9 (1)	Damian Stasiak	Decision (unanimous)	UFC Fight Night: Gonzaga vs. Cro Cop 2	April 11, 2015	3	5:00	Kraków, Poland	Return to Featherweight.
Loss	20–9 (1)	Sergio Pettis	Decision (unanimous)	UFC Fight Night: Henderson vs. Khabilov	June 7, 2014	3	5:00	Albuquerque, New Mexico, United States	
NC	20–8 (1)	Chico Camus	NC (overturned)	UFC on Fox: Henderson vs. Thomson	January 25, 2014	3	5:00	Chicago, Illinois, United States	Originally a decision win for Camus; overturned as he tested positive for marijuana.
Win	20–8	John Albert	Submission (rear-naked choke)	UFC on Fox: Johnson vs. Moraga	July 27, 2013	2	2:49	Seattle, Washington, United States	Bantamweight debut.
Loss	19–8	Chad Mendes	KO (punches)	UFC on FX: Sotiropoulos vs. Pearson	December 15, 2012	1	1:55	Gold Coast, Australia	
Win	19–7	Kevin Croom	Decision (unanimous)	RITC - Rage in the Cage 163	October 20, 2012	3	5:00	Chandler, Arizona, United States	
Loss	18–7	Andres Quintana	TKO (punches)	WMMA - Region 4 - Round 1	April 14, 2012	1	2:43	Prescott Valley, Arizona, United States	
Win	18–6	Ran Weathers	Decision (unanimous)	MBP - Sun City Battle 2	October 1, 2011	3	5:00	El Paso, Texas, United States	
Win	17–6	Eric Regan	Submission (guillotine choke)	RITC - Rage in the Cage 154	September 9, 2011	2	0:58	Chandler, Arizona, United States	
Win	16–6	Scott Pike	TKO (punches)	RITC - Rage in the Cage 151	April 16, 2011	1	1:39	Chandler, Arizona, United States	
Win	15–6	Nick Piedmont	Decision (unanimous)	DRFCF 8	November 19, 2010	3	5:00	Yuma, Arizona, United States	
Win	14–6	Brandon Shelton	Submission (guillotine choke)	C3 Fights - Slammin Jammin Weekend 6	October 22, 2010	1	1:42	Newkirk, Oklahoma, United States	
Win	13–6	Casey Milliken	Decision (unanimous)	RITC 143 - Rage in the Cage 143	July 31, 2010	3	5:00	Phoenix, Arizona, United States	
Loss	12–6	Rich Taylor	Decision (unanimous)	EB - Beatdown at 4 Bears 5	October 24, 2009	3	5:00	New Town, North Dakota, United States	
Loss	12–5	Jamie Schmidt	Submission (armbar)	AG - Extreme Beat Down	April 11, 2009	1	1:59	Phoenix, Arizona, United States	
Win	12–4	Travis Reddinger	Submission (rear-naked choke)	EB - Beatdown at 4 Bears 4	March 21, 2009	1	1:40	New Town, North Dakota, United States	
Win	11–4	Alonzo Martinez	Submission (guillotine choke)	EVO MMA - Evolution MMA	October 4, 2008	2	2:08	Phoenix, Arizona, United States	
Win	10–4	Antonio Lepe	TKO (punches)	MFC - Mexican Fighting Championship	September 20, 2008	1	2:30	Puerto Penasco, Mexico	
Win	9–4	Gabriel Benítez	Decision (unanimous)	NDG - Noche de Gladiadores	August 15, 2008	3	3:00	Hermosillo, Mexico	
Loss	8–4	Stephane Vigneault	TKO (punches)	TKO 34 - Sims vs. Bosse	June 7, 2008	2	3:28	Montreal, Quebec, Canada	
Win	8–3	Randy Steinke	Submission (rear-naked choke)	FMF - Full Moon Fighting	February 23, 2008	3	1:27	Sonora, Mexico	
Win	7–3	Hans Burnett	TKO (punches)	RITC 102 - Hodges vs. Schumacher	October 13, 2007	1	2:56	Tucson, Arizona, United States	
Win	6–3	Donny Walker	TKO (punches)	EC: Fights	September 29, 2007	2	N/A	Monterrey, Mexico	
Win	5–3	Austin Pascucci	Decision (unanimous)	RITC 98 - Rage in the Cage 98	July 21, 2007	3	3:00	Fountain Hills, Arizona, United States	
Win	4–3	Pete Vandervort	TKO (punches)	WFC - Rumble In The Red Rocks	June 9, 2007	1	2:25	Camp Verde, Arizona, United States	
Win	3–3	Patrick Lopez	Decision (split)	RITC 91 - Rage in the Cage 91	February 24, 2007	3	3:00	Phoenix, Arizona, United States	
Win	2–3	Richie Reyes	Submission (punches)	RITC 88 - Veteran's Day Rumble	November 11, 2006	2	1:29	Tucson, Arizona, United States	
Win	1–3	Robert Maldonado	Decision (unanimous)	RITC 86 - Rage in the Cage	August 15, 2006	3	3:00	Tucson, Arizona, United States	
Loss	0–3	Amos Sotelo	Submission (guillotine choke)	RITC 84 - Celebrity Theatre	July 1, 2006	2	1:55	Fort McDowell, Arizona, United States	
Loss	0–2	Amos Sotelo	Decision (unanimous)	RITC 82 - More Rage	May 26, 2006	3	3:00	Tucson, Arizona, United States	
Loss	0–1	Kyle Brees	Submission (triangle choke)	RITC 81 - Rage in the Cage 81	April 29, 2006	1	2:01	Upland, California, United States	

== See also ==
- List of current UFC fighters
- List of male mixed martial artists
