= Dustin Kimura =

American mixed martial arts fighter

- Born: May 21, 1989 (age 37); Honolulu, Hawaii, United States
- Other names: The Diamond, Cobalt with Gent, the Cottonhand Mauler
- Height: 5 ft 7 in (1.70 m)
- Weight: 135 lb (61 kg; 9.6 st)
- Division: Featherweight; Bantamweight
- Reach: 71 in (180 cm)
- Style: Kickboxing
- Fighting out of: Honolulu, Hawaii, United States
- Team: Gracie Technics
- Years active: 2009–present

Mixed martial arts record
- Total: 14
- Wins: 11
- By knockout: 2
- By submission: 8
- By decision: 1
- Losses: 3
- By submission: 1
- By decision: 2

Other information
- Mixed martial arts record from Sherdog

Dustin Kimura (born May 21, 1989) is an American mixed martial artist, who formerly competed in the Bantamweight division of the Ultimate Fighting Championship.

== Background ==
Kimura went to Kalani High School and then attended Honolulu Community College for Welding Technology. Dustin currently trains at Gracie Technics Honolulu.

== MMA career ==
=== Early career ===
Kimura compiled a 9–0 professional record before signing with the UFC.

=== Ultimate Fighting Championship ===
Kimura made his promotional debut against Chico Camus on February 2, 2013, at UFC 156. He won the fight via submission in the third round.

In his second fight with the promotion, Kimura faced Mitch Gagnon on September 21, 2013, at UFC 165. He lost the fight via submission, resulting in the first loss of his professional MMA career.

Kimura faced promotional newcomer Jon Delos Reyes on January 4, 2014, at UFC Fight Night 34. He won the fight via submission in the first round.

Kimura faced George Roop on April 16, 2014, at The Ultimate Fighter Nations Finale. He lost the fight via unanimous decision.

Kimura was expected to face Ian Entwistle on September 5, 2014, at UFC Fight Night 50. However, Entwistle pulled out of the bout citing an injury. Subsequently, Kimura was paired with Chris Beal at the event. In turn, Kimura also pulled out of the bout and was replaced by Tateki Matsuda.

Kimura faced promotional newcomer Henry Cejudo on December 13, 2014, at UFC on Fox 13. He lost the fight by unanimous decision, and was subsequently released from the promotion shortly after.

== Mixed martial arts record ==
Professional record breakdown
14 matches	11 wins	3 losses
By knockout	2	0
By submission	8	1
By decision	1	2

Res.	Record	Opponent	Method	Event	Date	Round	Time	Location	Notes
Loss	11–3	Henry Cejudo	Decision (unanimous)	UFC on Fox: dos Santos vs. Miocic	December 13, 2014	3	5:00	Phoenix, Arizona, United States	
Loss	11–2	George Roop	Decision (unanimous)	The Ultimate Fighter Nations Finale: Bisping vs. Kennedy	April 16, 2014	3	5:00	Quebec City, Quebec, Canada	
Win	11–1	Jon delos Reyes	Submission (armbar)	UFC Fight Night: Saffiedine vs. Lim	January 4, 2014	1	2:13	Marina Bay, Singapore	
Loss	10–1	Mitch Gagnon	Technical Submission (guillotine choke)	UFC 165	September 21, 2013	1	4:05	Toronto, Ontario, Canada	
Win	10–0	Chico Camus	Submission (rear-naked choke)	UFC 156	February 2, 2013	3	1:50	Las Vegas, Nevada, United States	Catchweight (139.5 lbs) bout; Kimura missed weight.
Win	9–0	Guy Delumeau	KO (punch)	Pacific Xtreme Combat 34	November 17, 2012	3	4:44	Quezon City, Philippines	
Win	8–0	Damaso Pereira	TKO (punches)	Destiny MMA - Na Koa 1	September 8, 2012	2	1:48	Honolulu, Hawaii, United States	
Win	7–0	Toby Misech	Submission (rear-naked choke)	King of the Cage: Ali'is	July 14, 2012	1	4:07	Honolulu, Hawaii, United States	
Win	6–0	Eddie Perrells	Submission (achilles lock)	X-1 and Destiny - Crossfire	August 13, 2011	1	2:49	Wailuku, Hawaii, United States	
Win	5–0	Kurrent Cockett	Submission (armbar)	X-1 - Champions 3	March 12, 2011	1	2:58	Wailuku, Hawaii, United States	
Win	4–0	Sadhu Bott	Decision (unanimous)	X-1 - Island Pride	April 11, 2013	3	5:00	Wailuku, Hawaii, United States	
Win	3–0	Chris Willems	Submission (triangle choke)	X-1 - Heroes	September 11, 2010	1	2:55	Wailuku, Hawaii, United States	
Win	2–0	Spencer Higa	Submission (guillotine choke)	X-1 - Nations Collide	June 4, 2010	2	0:57	Wailuku, Hawaii, United States	
Win	1–0	Jake Noble	Submission (rear-naked choke)	Destiny MMA - Maui No Ka'oi	August 22, 2009	2	1:20	Wailuku, Hawaii, United States	

== Amateur mixed martial arts record ==
Professional record breakdown
3 matches	3 wins	0 losses
By submission	2	0
By decision	1	0

Res.	Record	Opponent	Method	Event	Date	Round	Time	Location	Notes
Win	3–0	Jon Barnard	Submission (rear-naked choke)	Destiny MMA - Bad Blood	May 2, 2009	1	N/A	Waipahu, Hawaii, United States	
Win	2–0	Vernon Perengit	Submission (rear-naked choke)	Destiny MMA - The 2nd Coming	February 21, 2009	2	1:02	Waipahu, Hawaii, United States	
Win	1–0	Elijah Manners	Decision (unanimous)	X-1 - Fight Club Meets Night Club 5	November 21, 2008	2	3:00	Honolulu, Hawaii, United States	Amateur MMA debut
