= Alp Ozkilic =

Turkish-American mixed martial artist

- Born: Alptekin Özkılıç; March 27, 1986 (age 40); Istanbul, Turkey
- Other names: Turkish Delight
- Nationality: Turkish-American
- Height: 5 ft 5 in (165 cm)
- Weight: 125 lb (57 kg; 8 st 13 lb)
- Division: Bantamweight; Flyweight
- Reach: 65.0 in (165 cm)
- Style: Wrestling
- Stance: Orthodox
- Fighting out of: Hicksville, New York, United States
- Years active: 2010–present

Mixed martial arts record
- Total: 14
- Wins: 9
- By knockout: 2
- By submission: 1
- By decision: 6
- Losses: 5
- By knockout: 2
- By decision: 3

Other information
- University: Lindenwood University
- Website: Official UFC Profile
- Mixed martial arts record from Sherdog
- Last updated on: April 21, 2014

Alp Ozkilic (born March 27, 1986), full name Alptekin Özkılıç, is a Turkish-American mixed martial artist, who formerly competed as a Flyweight in the Ultimate Fighting Championship.

== Background ==
Born and raised in Istanbul, Turkey, Özkılıç moved to the United States in 2004. He attended Nassau Community College where he was a NJCAA All-American wrestler before transferring to Lindenwood University.

== Mixed martial arts career ==
Özkılıç began his mixed martial arts career in 2010, competing mostly for regional promotions in his adopted Missouri and the central United States. He compiled a record of 7-1 facing notable veterans Chico Camus and Antonio Banuelos before signing with the UFC in November 2013.

=== Ultimate Fighting Championship ===
Özkılıç made his promotional debut on December 14, 2013 at UFC on Fox 9 against Darren Uyenoyama, replacing an injured John Moraga. Özkılıç won the bout via split decision.

Özkılıç faced Louis Smolka on January 15, 2014 at UFC Fight Night 35. He lost the fight via unanimous decision.

Özkılıç faced John Lineker on July 16, 2014 at UFC Fight Night 45. Lineker defeated Özkılıç via third round TKO, in a bout that earned both participants Fight of the Night honors.

Özkılıç faced Ben Nguyen on May 10, 2015 at UFC Fight Night 65. He lost the fight via TKO in the first round. Subsequently, Özkılıç was released from the organization.

== Championships and achievements ==
=== Mixed martial arts ===
- Ultimate Fighting Championship
  - Fight of the Night (One time)

== Mixed martial arts record ==
Professional record breakdown
14 matches	9 wins	5 losses
By knockout	2	2
By submission	1	0
By decision	6	3

Res.	Record	Opponent	Method	Event	Date	Round	Time	Location	Notes
Loss	9–5	Kwan Ho Kwak	Decision (unanimous)	Kunlun Fight - Cage Fight Series 5 / Top FC 11	May 22, 2016	5	5:00	Seoul, South Korea	
Loss	9–4	Ben Nguyen	KO (punches)	UFC Fight Night: Miocic vs. Hunt	May 10, 2015	1	4:59	Adelaide, Australia	
Loss	9–3	John Lineker	TKO (punches)	UFC Fight Night: Cowboy vs. Miller	July 16, 2014	3	4:51	Atlantic City, New Jersey, United States	Fight of the Night.
Loss	9–2	Louis Smolka	Decision (unanimous)	UFC Fight Night: Rockhold vs. Philippou	January 15, 2014	3	5:00	Duluth, Georgia, United States	
Win	9–1	Darren Uyenoyama	Decision (split)	UFC on Fox: Johnson vs. Benavidez 2	December 14, 2013	3	5:00	Sacramento, California, United States	
Win	8–1	Antonio Banuelos	TKO (punches)	Legacy FC 20	May 31, 2013	1	0:30	Corpus Christi, Texas, United States	
Win	7–1	Josh Robinson	TKO (punches)	Rumble Time Promotions: Rage on the River	February 15, 2013	2	4:00	St. Charles, Missouri, United States	Flyweight debut.
Win	6–1	Ray Grindstaff	Decision (unanimous)	Rumble Time Promotions	October 26, 2012	3	5:00	St. Charles, Missouri, United States	
Loss	5–1	Chico Camus	Decision (unanimous)	LOF 52: Tachi Tourney Semifinals	April 13, 2012	3	5:00	Indianapolis, Indiana, United States	
Win	5–0	Andrew Huffman	Decision (unanimous)	LOF 51: Little Giants	February 10, 2012	3	5:00	Indianapolis, Indiana, United States	
Win	4–0	Damian Jeffro	Decision (unanimous)	Fight Me MMA	November 11, 2011	3	5:00	St. Charles, Missouri, United States	
Win	3–0	Bruce Sessman	Submission (rear-naked choke)	Premier Combat League: Cage Madness	March 26, 2011	1	0:49	Glen Carbon, Illinois, United States	
Win	2–0	Sergio da Silva	Decision (unanimous)	Ring of Combat 34	February 4, 2011	2	5:00	Atlantic City, New Jersey, United States	
Win	1–0	Brandon Wood	Decision (unanimous)	Capital City Cage Wars	November 27, 2010	3	5:00	St. Louis, Missouri, United States	

== See also ==
- List of current UFC fighters
- List of male mixed martial artists
