= 2014 in UFC =

Mixed martial arts events

Information
- First date: January 4
- Last date: December 20

Events
- Total events: 46 (1 cancelled)
- UFC: 12 (1 cancelled)
- UFC on Fox: 4
- UFC Fight Night: 28
- TUF Finale events: 2

Fights
- Total fights: 503
- Title fights: 16

Chronology
2013 in UFC	2014 in UFC	2015 in UFC

The year 2014 was the 22nd year in the history of the Ultimate Fighting Championship (UFC), a mixed martial arts promotion based in the United States.

== 2014 UFC.com awards ==
2014 UFC.COM Awards
No	Best Fighter	The Upsets	The Submissions	The Newcomers	The Knockouts	The Fights
1	Robbie Lawler	T.J. Dillashaw defeats Renan Barão 1 UFC 173	Charles Oliveira defeats Hatsu Hioki; UFC Fight Night: Te Huna vs. Marquardt	Corey Anderson	Dong Hyun Kim defeats John Hathaway; The Ultimate Fighter China Finale: Kim vs. Hathaway	Johny Hendricks defeats Robbie Lawler; UFC 171
2	Ronda Rousey	Rafael dos Anjos defeats Benson Henderson; UFC Fight Night: Henderson vs. dos Anjos	Anthony Pettis defeats Gilbert Melendez; UFC 181	Jake Matthews	Chris Beal defeats Patrick Williams; UFC 172	José Aldo defeats Chad Mendes 2 UFC 179
3	T.J. Dillashaw	Rick Story defeats Gunnar Nelson; UFC Fight Night: Nelson vs. Story	Ben Saunders defeats Chris Heatherly; UFC Fight Night: Henderson vs. dos Anjos	Aljamain Sterling	Josh Samman defeats Eddie Gordon; UFC 181	Junior dos Santos defeats Stipe Miocic 1 UFC on Fox: dos Santos vs. Miocic
4	Donald Cerrone	Alex Caceres defeats Sergio Pettis; UFC on Fox: Henderson vs. Thomson	Luke Rockhold defeats Tim Boetsch; UFC 172	Warlley Alves	Mark Hunt defeats Roy Nelson; UFC Fight Night: Hunt vs. Nelson	Matt Brown defeats Erick Silva; UFC Fight Night: Brown vs. Silva
5	Rory MacDonald	Ben Rothwell defeats Alistair Overeem; UFC Fight Night: Jacaré vs. Mousasi	Mitch Clarke defeats Al Iaquinta; UFC 173	Colby Covington	Roy Nelson defeats Antônio Rodrigo Nogueira; UFC Fight Night: Nogueira vs. Nelson	Abel Trujillo defeats Jamie Varner; UFC 169
6	Luke Rockhold	Al Iaquinta defeats Ross Pearson; UFC Fight Night: Rockhold vs. Bisping	Alex Chambers defeats Anthony Birchak; UFC on Fox: dos Santos vs. Miocic	Elias Theodorou	Dan Henderson defeats Maurício Rua 2 UFC Fight Night: Shogun vs. Henderson 2	Chris Weidman defeats Lyoto Machida; UFC 175
7	Fabrício Werdum	Johnny Eduardo defeats Eddie Wineland; UFC Fight Night: Brown vs. Silva	Raquel Pennington defeats Ashlee Evans-Smith; UFC 181	Patrick Cummins	Fabrício Werdum defeats Mark Hunt; UFC 180	Robbie Lawler defeats Matt Brown; UFC on Fox: Lawler vs. Brown
8	Rafael dos Anjos	Zak Cummings defeats Yan Cabral; UFC Fight Night: Miocic vs. Hunt	Leandro Issa defeats Zhumabek Tursyn; The Ultimate Fighter: Team Edgar vs. Team Penn Finale	Rashid Magomedov	Albert Tumenov defeats Matt Dwyer; UFC Fight Night: MacDonald vs. Saffiedine	T.J. Dillashaw defeats Renan Barão 1 UFC 173
9	Max Holloway	Thiago Santos defeats Ronny Markes; UFC Fight Night: Shogun vs. Henderson 2	Daniel Cormier defeats Dan Henderson; UFC 173	Joanna Jędrzejczyk	Mike Wilkinson defeats Niklas Bäckström; UFC Fight Night: Nelson vs. Story	Dan Henderson defeats Maurício Rua 2 UFC Fight Night: Shogun vs. Henderson 2
10	Neil Magny	Roger Narvaez defeats Luke Barnatt; UFC Fight Night: Edgar vs. Swanson	Joseph Benavidez defeats Tim Elliott; UFC 172	Carla Esparza (Tie); Paige VanZant (Tie); Henry Cejudo (Tie)	Abel Trujillo defeats Jamie Varner; UFC 169	Cathal Pendred defeats Mike King; UFC Fight Night: McGregor vs. Brandão
Ref						

== 2014 by the numbers ==
The numbers below records the events, fights, techniques, champions and fighters held or performed for the year of 2014 in UFC.

Events
Number of Events	PPV	Continents	Countries	Cities	Fight Night Bonuses
46	12	5	14	39	163; Total $8,150,000
Longest Event	Shortest Event	Highest Income Live Gate	Lowest Income Live Gate	Highest Attendance	Lowest Attendance
UFC Fight Night: Machida vs. Mousasi 2:52:32	UFC Fight Night: Rockhold vs. Bisping 1:03:51	UFC 175 $4,400,000	The Ultimate Fighter 20 Finale $143,000	UFC 180 21,000	The Ultimate Fighter 20 Finale 1,800
Title Fights
Undisputed Title Fights	Title Changes	Champions Remained in Their Divisions	Number of Champions	Number of Interim Champions	Number of Title Defenses
15	2	7 FLW – Demetrious Johnson; FW – José Aldo; LW – Anthony Pettis; MW – Chris Weidman; LHW – Jon Jones; HW – Cain Velasquez; WBW – Ronda Rousey	11	1	11
Champions
Division	Beginning of The Year	End of The Year	Division	Beginning of The Year	End of The Year
Heavyweight	Cain Velasquez	Cain Velasquez	Bantamweight	Renan Barão	T.J. Dillashaw
Light Heavyweight	Jon Jones	Jon Jones	Flyweight	Demetrious Johnson	Demetrious Johnson
Middleweight	Chris Weidman	Chris Weidman	Women's Bantamweight	Ronda Rousey	Ronda Rousey
Welterweight	Vacant	Robbie Lawler	Women's Strawweight	None	Carla Esparza
Lightweight	Anthony Pettis	Anthony Pettis			
Featherweight	José Aldo	José Aldo			
Fights
Most Knockouts at A Single Event	Most submissions at A Single Event	Most Decisions at A Single Event	Total Number of Fights	Total Number of Cage Time	
UFC Fight Night: Cerrone vs. Miller 8	UFC 180 5	UFC Fight Night: Machida vs. Mousasi 10	503	89:01:49	
Fighters
Number of Fighters	UFC Debutants	Releases / Retired	Fighters Suspended	Number of Fighters Missed weight	
(At the end of Dec 31, 2014); 1006	229	N/A	N/A	9	
Champion feats
Robbie Lawler became the first UFC fighter to win a championship via split decision.
Fighter feats
Nikita Krylov recorded the fastest head‑kick knockout at the time when he stopped his opponent 25 seconds into the first round at UFC on FOX 10. The record was later surpassed by Abdul Razak Alhassan in August 2021 with a 17‑second knockout.; Dong Hyun Kim landed the first spinning-elbow knockout victory with his win at UFC Fight Night: Kim vs. Hathaway.; Neil Magny tied Roger Huerta for the most wins in a single calendar year in modern UFC history, securing five victories.; Jesse Ronson became the first fighter to lose three consecutive bouts by split decision, a distinction later matched by Zhalgas Zhumagulov and Dennis Bermudez.; Ben Saunders earned the first omoplata submission victory in UFC history with his win at UFC Fight Night 49.

== Debut UFC fighters ==
The following fighters fought their first UFC fight in 2014:

ISO	Fighter	Division
(United States)	Aaron Phillips	Bantamweight
(Republic of Ireland)	Aisling Daly	Women's Strawweight
(Mexico)	Akbarh Arreola	Lightweight
(United States)	Alan Jouban	Welterweight
(Germany)	Alan Omer	Lightweight
(Canada)	Albert Cheng	Lightweight
(Russia)	Albert Tumenov	Welterweight
(Brazil)	Alberto Mina	Welterweight
(Mexico)	Alejandro Pérez	Bantamweight
(Russia)	Aleksei Oleinik	Heavyweight
(Australia)	Alex Chambers	Women's Strawweight
(United States)	Alex White	Featherweight
(Russia)	Alexander Yakovlev	Welterweight
(United States)	Alexis Dufresne	Women's Bantamweight
(United States)	Aljamain Sterling	Bantamweight
(Sweden)	Andreas Ståhl	Welterweight
(United States)	Andy Enz	Middleweight
(United States)	Angela Hill	Women's Strawweight
(United States)	Angela Magaña	Women's Strawweight
(United States)	Anthony Birchak	Bantamweight
(United States)	Anthony Hamilton	Heavyweight
(Brazil)	Antônio Carlos Jr.	Light Heavyweight
(Brazil)	Antônio dos Santos Jr.	Middleweight
(United States)	Ashlee Evans-Smith	Women's Bantamweight
(Mexico)	Augusto Montaño	Welterweight
(Australia)	Bec Rawlings	Women's Strawweight
(Iran)	Beneil Dariush	Lightweight
(Australia)	Brendan O'Reilly	Lightweight
(United States)	Brian Ortega	Featherweight
(United States)	Bryan Barberena	Welterweight
(United States)	Bubba Bush	Middleweight
(United States)	Bubba McDaniel	Middleweight
(United States)	Cain Carrizosa	Lightweight
(United States)	Carla Esparza	Women's Strawweight
(Brazil)	Carlos Diego Ferreira	Lightweight
(Republic of Ireland)	Cathal Pendred	Welterweight
(Canada)	Chad Laprise	Lightweight
(United States)	Charles Rosa	Featherweight
(United States)	Chas Skelly	Featherweight
(United States)	Chris Beal	Bantamweight
(United States)	Chris Dempsey	Middleweight
(United States)	Chris Heatherly	Welterweight
(Australia)	Chris Indich	Welterweight
(Canada)	Chris Kelades	Flyweight
(United States)	Chris Wade	Lightweight
(United States)	Christos Giagos	Lightweight
(Brazil)	Cláudia Gadelha	Women's Strawweight
(Brazil)	Cláudio Silva	Welterweight
(United States)	Clay Collard	Featherweight
(United States)	Cody Gibson	Bantamweight
(United States)	Colby Covington	Welterweight
(United States)	Corey Anderson	Light Heavyweight
(United States)	Damon Jackson	Featherweight
(New Zealand)	Dan Hooker	Featherweight
(Australia)	Dan Kelly	Middleweight
(United States)	Daniel Spohn	Light Heavyweight
(United States)	Danny Martinez	Flyweight
(England)	Danny Mitchell	Welterweight
(United States)	Dashon Johnson	Lightweight
(Philippines)	Dave Galera	Bantamweight
(United States)	David Michaud	Welterweight
(United States)	Derrick Lewis	Heavyweight
(Brazil)	Dhiego Lima	Welterweight
(Chile)	Diego Rivas	Bantamweight
(South Korea)	Doo Ho Choi	Featherweight
(Brazil)	Douglas Silva de Andrade	Bantamweight
(United States)	Eddie Alvarez	Lightweight
(United States)	Eddie Gordon	Middleweight
(Canada)	Elias Theodorou	Middleweight
(United States)	Elizabeth Phillips	Women's Bantamweight
(United States)	Emily Kagan	Women's Strawweight
(United States)	Ernest Chavez	Lightweight
(United States)	Felice Herrig	Women's Strawweight
(United States)	Francisco Treviño	Lightweight
(United States)	Frankie Saenz	Bantamweight
(Mexico)	Gabriel Benítez	Featherweight

ISO	Fighter	Division
(Russia)	Gasan Umalatov	Welterweight
(United States)	George Sullivan	Welterweight
(Brazil)	Gilbert Burns	Lightweight
(Argentina)	Guido Cannetti	Bantamweight
(Brazil)	Guilherme Vasconcelos	Middleweight
(Brazil)	Guto Inocente	Light Heavyweight
(Netherlands)	Hans Stringer	Light Heavyweight
(United States)	Heather Jo Clark	Women's Strawweight
(Mexico)	Héctor Urbina	Welterweight
(Mexico)	Henry Briones	Bantamweight
(United States)	Henry Cejudo	Flyweight
(Brazil)	Hernani Perpétuo	Welterweight
(Panama)	Humberto Brown	Bantamweight
(England)	Ian Entwistle	Bantamweight
(United States)	Jack May	Heavyweight
(United States)	Jake Collier	Middleweight
(United States)	Jake Lindsey	Lightweight
(Australia)	Jake Matthews	Lightweight
(United States)	James Moontasri	Lightweight
(Poland)	Jan Błachowicz	Light Heavyweight
(Canada)	Jason Saggo	Lightweight
(United States)	Jerrod Sanders	Featherweight
(United States)	Jessica Penne	Women's Strawweight
(United States)	Jim Alers	Featherweight
(Poland)	Joanna Jędrzejczyk	Women's Strawweight
(Scotland)	Joanne Calderwood	Women's Strawweight
(United States)	Joby Sanchez	Flyweight
(United States)	Joe Ellenberger	Lightweight
(United States)	Joe Soto	Bantamweight
(United States)	Johnny Case	Lightweight
(Guam)	Jon Delos Reyes	Flyweight
(Brazil)	Jorge de Oliveira	Lightweight
(Mexico)	José Alberto Quiñónez	Bantamweight
(United States)	Josh Copeland	Heavyweight
(United States)	Josh Shockley	Lightweight
(Mexico)	Juan Puig	Bantamweight
(Brazil)	Juliana Lima	Women's Strawweight
(China)	Jumabieke Tuerxun	Bantamweight
(United States)	Justin Jones	Middleweight
(United States)	Kailin Curran	Women's Strawweight
(Canada)	Kajan Johnson	Lightweight
(Japan)	Katsunori Kikuno	Lightweight
(United States)	Keith Berish	Middleweight
(United States)	Kevin Lee	Lightweight
(Japan)	Kiichi Kunimoto	Welterweight
(Brazil)	Larissa Pacheco	Women's Featherweight
(United States)	Lauren Murphy	Women's Bantamweight
(Brazil)	Leandro Issa	Bantamweight
(England)	Leon Edwards	Welterweight
(Nicaragua)	Leonardo Morales	Featherweight
(United States)	Leslie Smith	Women's Bantamweight
(China)	Li Jingliang	Welterweight
(United States)	Lisa Ellis	Women's Strawweight
(United States)	Louis Smolka	Flyweight
(Brazil)	Luiz Dutra	Welterweight
(United States)	Luke Zachrich	Middleweight
(Russia)	Mairbek Taisumov	Lightweight
(Poland)	Marcin Bandel	Welterweight
(Brazil)	Márcio Alexandre Jr.	Middleweight
(Mexico)	Marco Beltrán	Bantamweight
(Brazil)	Marcos Rogério de Lima	Heavyweight
(Philippines)	Mark Eddiva	Featherweight
(Ecuador)	Marlon Vera	Bantamweight
(Japan)	Masanori Kanehara	Bantamweight
(Sweden)	Mats Nilsson	Middleweight
(Canada)	Matt Dwyer	Welterweight
(United States)	Matt Hobar	Bantamweight
(United States)	Matt Van Buren	Light Heavyweight
(Japan)	Michinori Tanaka	Bantamweight
(United States)	Mike De La Torre	Featherweight
(United States)	Mike King	Middleweight
(United States)	Mike Rhodes	Welterweight
(Russia)	Milana Dudieva	Women's Bantamweight
(Bosnia and Herzegovina)	Mirsad Bektic	Featherweight

ISO	Fighter	Division
(Republic of Ireland)	Neil Seery	Flyweight
(Germany)	Nick Hein	Lightweight
(Sweden)	Niklas Bäckström	Featherweight
(United States)	Nina Ansaroff	Women's Strawweight
(China)	Ning Guangyou	Bantamweight
(Israel)	Noad Lahat	Featherweight
(United States)	Nolan Ticman	Flyweight
(Canada)	Nordine Taleb	Welterweight
(Canada)	Olivier Aubin-Mercier	Lightweight
(United States)	Paige VanZant	Women's Strawweight
(United States)	Patrick Cummins	Light Heavyweight
(Republic of Ireland)	Patrick Holohan	Flyweight
(United States)	Patrick Walsh	Middleweight
(United States)	Patrick Williams	Bantamweight
(United States)	Paul Felder	Lightweight
(Poland)	Pawel Pawlak	Welterweight
(Brazil)	Pedro Munhoz	Bantamweight
(Iraq)	Randa Markos	Women's Strawweight
(Russia)	Rashid Magomedov	Lightweight
(United States)	Ray Borg	Flyweight
(Brazil)	Renato Moicano	Featherweight
(Brazil)	Ricardo Abreu	Middleweight
(Australia)	Richard Walsh	Welterweight
(Brazil)	Richardson Moreira	Middleweight
(Japan)	Rin Nakai	Women's Bantamweight
(United States)	Rob Font	Bantamweight
(United States)	Robert Drysdale	Light Heavyweight
(Mexico)	Rodolfo Rubio	Bantamweight
(Brazil)	Rodrigo de Lima	Lightweight
(United States)	Roger Narvaez	Middleweight
(Philippines)	Roldan Sangcha-an	Flyweight
(United States)	Roman Salazar	Bantamweight
(Singapore)	Royston Wee	Bantamweight
(South Africa)	Ruan Potts	Heavyweight
(Russia)	Ruslan Magomedov	Heavyweight
(United States)	Russell Doane	Bantamweight
(United States)	Sam Alvey	Middleweight
(Canada)	Sarah Moras	Women's Bantamweight
(England)	Scott Askham	Middleweight
(United States)	Sean O'Connell	Light Heavyweight
(United States)	Sean Soriano	Featherweight
(United States)	Sean Strickland	Welterweight
(South Korea)	Seo Hee Ham	Women's Strawweight
(United States)	Shane Howell	Flyweight
(United States)	Shayna Baszler	Women's Bantamweight
(Canada)	Sheldon Westcott	Welterweight
(Japan)	Shinsho Anzai	Welterweight
(Japan)	Shunichi Shimizu	Flyweight
(South Korea)	Tae Hyun Bang	Lightweight
(Japan)	Takenori Sato	Welterweight
(Belgium)	Tarec Saffiedine	Welterweight
(Japan)	Tateki Matsuda	Flyweight
(Japan)	Tatsuya Kawajiri	Featherweight
(United States)	Tecia Torres	Women's Strawweight
(Brazil)	Thomas Almeida	Bantamweight
(Brazil)	Tiago Trator	Lightweight
(United States)	Tim Gorman	Bantamweight
(Finland)	Tina Lähdemäki	Women's Strawweight
(United States)	Anthony Rocco Martin	Lightweight
(Japan)	Ulka Sasaki	Flyweight
(Canada)	Valérie Létourneau	Women's Strawweight
(Brazil)	Valmir Lazaro	Lightweight
(Czech Republic)	Viktor Pešta	Heavyweight
(Brazil)	Vitor Miranda	Middleweight
(Brazil)	Wagner Silva	Middleweight
(China)	Wang Anying	Welterweight
(China)	Wang Sai	Welterweight
(Brazil)	Warlley Alves	Welterweight
(Brazil)	Wendell Oliveira	Welterweight
(United States)	Will Chope	Featherweight
(United States)	Willie Gates	Flyweight
(Mexico)	Yair Rodríguez	Featherweight
(China)	Yang Jianping	Featherweight
(China)	Yao Zhikui	Flyweight
(Cuba)	Yosdenis Cedeno	Lightweight
(South Korea)	Yui Chul Nam	Lightweight
(China)	Zhang Lipeng	Lightweight
(Russia)	Zubaira Tukhugov	Featherweight

== The Ultimate Fighter ==
Season	Finale	Division	Winner	Runner-up
TUF Nations: Canada vs. Australia	Apr 16, 2014	Welterweight	Chad Laprise	Olivier Aubin-Mercier
TUF Nations: Canada vs. Australia	Apr 16, 2014	Middleweight	Elias Theodorou	Sheldon Westcott
TUF: Brazil 3	May 31, 2014	Middleweight	Warlley Alves	Márcio Alexandre Júnior
TUF: Brazil 3	May 31, 2014	Heavyweight	Antônio Carlos Júnior	Vitor Miranda
TUF 19: Team Edgar vs. Team Penn	Jul 6, 2014	Middleweight	Eddie Gordon	Dhiego Lima
TUF 19: Team Edgar vs. Team Penn	Jul 6, 2014	Light Heavyweight	Corey Anderson	Matt Van Buren
TUF: Latin America	Nov 15, 2014	Bantamweight	Alejandro Pérez	José Alberto Quiñonez
TUF: Latin America	Nov 15, 2014	Featherweight	Yair Rodríguez	Leonardo Morales
TUF 20: A Champion Will Be Crowned	Dec 12, 2014	Women's Strawweight	Carla Esparza	Rose Namajunas

== Title fights ==
Title fights in 2014
Weight class				Method	Round	Time	Event	Notes
Featherweight	José Aldo (c)	def.	Ricardo Lamas	Decision (unanimous) (49–46, 49–46, 49–46)	5	5:00	UFC 169	(Note: For the UFC Featherweight Championship.)
Bantamweight	Renan Barão (c)	def.	Urijah Faber	TKO (punches)	1	3:42	UFC 169	(Note: For the UFC Bantamweight Championship.)
Women's Bantamweight	Ronda Rousey (c)	def.	Sara McMann	TKO (knee to the body)	1	1:06	UFC 170	(Note: For the UFC Women's Bantamweight Championship.)
Welterweight	Johny Hendricks	def.	Robbie Lawler	Decision (unanimous) (48–47, 48–47, 48–47)	5	5:00	UFC 171	(Note: For the vacant UFC Welterweight Championship.)
Light Heavyweight	Jon Jones (c)	def.	Glover Teixeira	Decision (unanimous) (50–45, 50–45, 50–45)	5	5:00	UFC 172	(Note: For the UFC Light Heavyweight Championship.)
Bantamweight	T.J. Dillashaw	def.	Renan Barão (c)	TKO (head kick & punches)	5	2:26	UFC 173	(Note: For the UFC Bantamweight Championship.)
Flyweight	Demetrious Johnson (c)	def.	Ali Bagautinov	Decision (unanimous) (50–45, 50–45, 50–45)	5	5:00	UFC 174	(Note: For the UFC Flyweight Championship.)
Women's Bantamweight	Ronda Rousey (c)	def.	Alexis Davis	KO (punches)	1	0:16	UFC 175	(Note: For the UFC Women's Bantamweight Championship.)
Middleweight	Chris Weidman (c)	def.	Lyoto Machida	Decision (unanimous) (49–45, 48–47, 49–46)	5	5:00	UFC 175	(Note: For the UFC Middleweight Championship.)
Bantamweight	T.J. Dillashaw (c)	def.	Joe Soto	KO (head kick and punches)	5	2:20	UFC 177	(Note: For the UFC Bantamweight Championship.)
Flyweight	Demetrious Johnson (c)	def.	Chris Cariaso	Submission (kimura)	2	2:29	UFC 178	(Note: For the UFC Flyweight Championship.)
Featherweight	José Aldo (c)	def.	Chad Mendes	Decision (unanimous) (49–46, 49–46, 49–46)	5	5:00	UFC 179	(Note: For the UFC Featherweight Championship.)
Heavyweight	Fabrício Werdum	def.	Mark Hunt	TKO (flying knee and punches)	2	2:27	UFC 180	(Note: For the interim UFC Heavyweight Championship.)
Lightweight	Anthony Pettis (c)	def.	Gilbert Melendez	Submission (guillotine choke)	2	1:53	UFC 181	(Note: For the UFC Lightweight Championship.)
Welterweight	Robbie Lawler	def.	Johny Hendricks (c)	Decision (split) (48–47, 47–48, 49–46)	5	5:00	UFC 181	(Note: For the UFC Welterweight Championship.)
Women's Strawweight	Carla Esparza	def.	Rose Namajunas	Submission (rear-naked choke)	3	1:26	TUF 20 Finale	(Note: For the inaugural UFC Women's Strawweight Championship.)

== Events list ==
#	Event	Date	Venue	Location	Attendance
303	UFC Fight Night: Machida vs. Dollaway	Dec 20, 2014	Ginásio José Corrêa	Barueri, Brazil	—N/a
302	UFC on Fox: dos Santos vs. Miocic	Dec 13, 2014	US Airways Center	Phoenix, Arizona, U.S.	15,300
301	The Ultimate Fighter: A Champion Will Be Crowned Finale	Dec 12, 2014	Palms Casino Resort	Las Vegas, Nevada, U.S.	1,800
300	UFC 181: Hendricks vs. Lawler II	Dec 6, 2014	Mandalay Bay Events Center	Las Vegas, Nevada, U.S.	9,617
299	UFC Fight Night: Edgar vs. Swanson	Nov 22, 2014	Frank Erwin Center	Austin, Texas, U.S.	10,131
298	UFC 180: Werdum vs. Hunt	Nov 15, 2014	Arena Ciudad de México	Mexico City, Mexico	21,000
297	UFC Fight Night: Shogun vs. St. Preux	Nov 8, 2014	Ginásio Municipal Tancredo Neves	Uberlândia, Brazil	5,671
296	UFC Fight Night: Rockhold vs. Bisping	Nov 8, 2014	Allphones Arena	Sydney, New South Wales, Australia	9,904
295	UFC 179: Aldo vs. Mendes 2	Oct 25, 2014	Ginásio do Maracanãzinho	Rio de Janeiro, Brazil	11,415
294	UFC Fight Night: MacDonald vs. Saffiedine	Oct 4, 2014	Scotiabank Centre	Halifax, Nova Scotia, Canada	10,782
293	UFC Fight Night: Nelson vs. Story	Oct 4, 2014	Ericsson Globe Arena	Stockholm, Sweden	10,026
292	UFC 178: Johnson vs. Cariaso	Sep 27, 2014	MGM Grand Garden Arena	Las Vegas, Nevada, U.S.	10,544
291	UFC Fight Night: Hunt vs. Nelson	Sep 20, 2014	Saitama Super Arena	Saitama, Japan	12,395
290	UFC Fight Night: Bigfoot vs. Arlovski	Sep 13, 2014	Ginásio Nilson Nelson	Brasília, Brazil	8,822
289	UFC Fight Night: Jacare vs. Mousasi	Sep 5, 2014	Foxwoods Resort Casino	Ledyard, Connecticut, U.S.	4,086
288	UFC 177: Dillashaw vs. Soto	Aug 30, 2014	Sleep Train Arena	Sacramento, California, U.S.	11,100
287	UFC Fight Night: Henderson vs. dos Anjos	Aug 23, 2014	BOK Center	Tulsa, Oklahoma, U.S.	7,119
286	UFC Fight Night: Bisping vs. Le	Aug 23, 2014	CotaiArena	Macau, SAR, China	7,022
285	UFC Fight Night: Bader vs. St. Preux	Aug 16, 2014	Cross Insurance Center	Bangor, Maine, U.S.	5,329
–	UFC 176: Aldo vs. Mendes II	Aug 2, 2014	Staples Center	Los Angeles, U.S.	Cancelled
284	UFC on Fox: Lawler vs. Brown	Jul 26, 2014	SAP Center	San Jose, California, U.S.	11,482
283	UFC Fight Night: McGregor vs. Brandao	Jul 19, 2014	The O_{2}	Dublin, Ireland	9,500
282	UFC Fight Night: Cerrone vs. Miller	Jul 16, 2014	Revel Casino Hotel	Atlantic City, New Jersey, U.S.	4,115
281	The Ultimate Fighter: Team Edgar vs. Team Penn Finale	Jul 6, 2014	Mandalay Bay Events Center	Las Vegas, Nevada, U.S.	6,500
280	UFC 175: Weidman vs. Machida	Jul 5, 2014	Mandalay Bay Events Center	Las Vegas, Nevada, U.S.	10,088
279	UFC Fight Night: Swanson vs. Stephens	Jun 28, 2014	AT&T Center	San Antonio, U.S.	9,227
278	UFC Fight Night: Te Huna vs. Marquardt	Jun 28, 2014	Vector Arena	Auckland, New Zealand	8,089
277	UFC 174: Johnson vs. Bagautinov	Jun 14, 2014	Rogers Arena	Vancouver, British Columbia, Canada	13,506
276	UFC Fight Night: Henderson vs. Khabilov	Jun 7, 2014	Tingley Coliseum	Albuquerque, New Mexico, U.S.	8,775
275	The Ultimate Fighter Brazil 3 Finale: Miocic vs. Maldonado	May 31, 2014	Ginásio do Ibirapuera	São Paulo, Brazil	8,986
274	UFC Fight Night: Munoz vs. Mousasi	May 31, 2014	O_{2} World	Berlin, Germany	8,000
273	UFC 173: Barão vs. Dillashaw	May 24, 2014	MGM Grand Garden Arena	Las Vegas, Nevada, U.S.	11,036
272	UFC Fight Night: Brown vs. Silva	May 10, 2014	U.S. Bank Arena	Cincinnati, Ohio, U.S.	6,143
271	UFC 172: Jones vs. Teixeira	Apr 26, 2014	Baltimore Arena	Baltimore, Maryland, U.S.	13,485
270	UFC on Fox: Werdum vs. Browne	Apr 19, 2014	Amway Center	Orlando, Florida, U.S.	17,000
269	The Ultimate Fighter Nations Finale: Bisping vs. Kennedy	Apr 16, 2014	Colisée Pepsi	Quebec City, Quebec, Canada	5,029
268	UFC Fight Night: Nogueira vs. Nelson	Apr 11, 2014	du Arena	Abu Dhabi, United Arab Emirates	7,963
267	UFC Fight Night: Shogun vs. Henderson 2	Mar 23, 2014	Ginásio Nélio Dias	Natal, Rio Grande do Norte, Brazil	6,828
266	UFC 171: Hendricks vs. Lawler	Mar 15, 2014	American Airlines Center	Dallas, Texas, U.S.	19,324
265	UFC Fight Night: Gustafsson vs. Manuwa	Mar 8, 2014	The O_{2} Arena	London, England, U.K.	14,604
264	The Ultimate Fighter China Finale: Kim vs. Hathaway	Mar 1, 2014	CotaiArena	Macau, SAR, China	6,000
263	UFC 170: Rousey vs. McMann	Feb 22, 2014	Mandalay Bay Events Center	Las Vegas, Nevada, U.S.	10,217
262	UFC Fight Night: Machida vs. Mousasi	Feb 15, 2014	Arena Jaraguá	Jaraguá do Sul, Brazil	7,511
261	UFC 169: Barao vs. Faber II	Feb 1, 2014	Prudential Center	Newark, New Jersey, U.S.	14,308
260	UFC on Fox: Henderson vs. Thomson	Jan 25, 2014	United Center	Chicago, Illinois, U.S.	10,895
259	UFC Fight Night: Rockhold vs. Philippou	Jan 15, 2014	Arena at Gwinnett Center	Duluth, Georgia, U.S.	5,822
258	UFC Fight Night: Saffiedine vs. Lim	Jan 4, 2014	Marina Bay Sands	Marina Bay, Singapore	5,216

== See also ==
- UFC
- List of UFC champions
- List of UFC events
