= Josh Quayhagen =

American mixed martial arts fighter

- Born: August 30, 1986 (age 40); Leesville, Louisiana, United States
- Other names: Quay
- Height: 5 ft 10 in (1.78 m)
- Weight: 165 lb (75 kg; 11.8 st)
- Division: Lightweight; Welterweight
- Reach: 72 in (183 cm)
- Fighting out of: Lake Charles, Louisiana, United States
- Team: Performance Evolution Gym
- Rank: Fourth degree black belt in Kyokaido Karate
- Years active: 2011–present

Mixed martial arts record
- Total: 14
- Wins: 9
- By knockout: 3
- By decision: 6
- Losses: 5
- By knockout: 2
- By submission: 1
- By decision: 2

Other information
- Mixed martial arts record from Sherdog

Josh Quayhagen (born August 30, 1986) is an American mixed martial artist who competes in the Lightweight division. A professional mixed martial artist since 2011, Quayhagen has previously fought for Legacy FC, Bellator, and was a contestant on their reality show, Fight Master: Bellator MMA.

Quayhagen currently competes in full contact karate for Karate Combat, where he is the former Karate Combat Welterweight Champion.

== Background ==
Born and raised in Louisiana, Quayhagen began training in martial arts from a young age.

A decorated karate competitor, he has won eight USKA World Champion Adult Black Belt Kumite Grand Championships and five National Grand Championships as well as a PKC National Black Belt Grand Kumite Championship. Quayhagen holds the record in all three of these events for being the youngest ever to win the Grand Champion in both events. Quayhagen was 18 years old at both USKA worlds and PKC Nationals and 19 years old as the winner of the USKA World Grand Kumite Champion.

Quayhagen currently competes in full contact Karate League, Karate Combat. He is the reigning Welterweight Champion.

== Mixed martial arts career ==
=== Bellator ===
Quayhagen made his professional and Bellator debut against Cosmo Alexandre at Bellator 52. Despite coming in as an underdog, Quayhagen won the fight via unanimous decision.

Quayhagen was scheduled to face Quaint Kempf at Bellator 61 on March 16, 2012. However, Kempf pulled out of the fight due to injury. Quayhagen instead faced Brenton Taylor in a rematch from a bout in November 2011. Quayhagen defeated Taylor via unanimous decision.

Quayhagen faced Cliff Wright at Bellator 69 on May 18, 2012. Quayhagen won the fight via unanimous decision.

Quayhagen was scheduled to face Guillaume DeLorenzi at Bellator 76 on October 12, 2012. However, the bout was rescheduled for November 2, 2012 at Bellator 79. The bout never materialized due to issues with Quayhagen's contract.

A rematch with Cosmo Alexandre took place on November 9, 2012 at Bellator 80. Quayhagen suffered his first professional defeat via unanimous decision.

==== Fight Master: Bellator MMA ====
Quayhagen appeared as one of the contestants on the first season of Fight Master: Bellator MMA that debuted on Spike TV in June 2013. Quayhagen faced fellow Bellator veteran Chris Lozano in the entry round. After two rounds of fighting, Quayhagen lost the fight via unanimous decision, thus ending his run in the competition.

== Championships and accomplishments ==
- Karate Combat
  - Karate Combat 75kg Welterweight Championship (Current, one defense)

== Mixed martial arts record ==
Professional record breakdown
14 matches	9 wins	5 losses
By knockout	3	2
By submission	0	1
By decision	6	2
Draws	0	

Res.	Record	Opponent	Method	Event	Date	Round	Time	Location	Notes
Win	9–5	Rey Trujillo	Decision (unanimous)	Legacy Fighting Championship 58	July 22, 2016	3	5:00	Lake Charles, Louisiana, United States	
Loss	8–5	Zach Fears	Decision (split)	WFC 52: Allen vs. Rader	May 14, 2016	3	5:00	Baton Rouge, Louisiana, United States	
Loss	8–4	Sean Soriano	KO (punch)	Legacy FC 48: Leite vs. Spann	November 13, 2015	1	3:21	Lake Charles, Louisiana, United States	
Win	8–3	Anthony Njokuani	Decision (split)	Legacy Fighting Championship 42	June 26, 2015	3	5:00	Lake Charles, Louisiana, United States	
Loss	7–3	Thanh Le	TKO (punches)	World Fighting Championships 31	November 22, 2014	1	2:49	Baton Rouge, Louisiana, United States	
Loss	7–2	Lanny Dardar	Technical Submission	Vengeance Fighting Alliance: Round 3	January 18, 2014	3	4:18	Lake Charles, Louisiana, United States	Welterweight bout.
Win	7–1	Thomas Webb	Decision (unanimous)	WFC 12: Battle at the Belle	October 11, 2013	3	5:00	Baton Rouge, Louisiana, United States	
Loss	6–1	Cosmo Alexandre	Decision (unanimous)	Bellator 80	November 9, 2012	3	5:00	Hollywood, Florida, United States	Welterweight bout.
Win	6–0	Keith Miner	KO (punches)	USA MMA: Border War 3	August 18, 2012	1	3:31	Lake Charles, Louisiana, United States	
Win	5–0	Jason Haak	KO (head kick)	IXFA 8: Delta Downs	July 7, 2012	1	1:22	Vinton, Louisiana, United States	
Win	4–0	Cliff Wright	Decision (unanimous)	Bellator 69	May 18, 2012	3	5:00	Lake Charles, Louisiana, United States	Catchweight (158 lbs) bout.
Win	3–0	Brenton Taylor	Decision (unanimous)	Bellator 61	March 16, 2012	3	5:00	Bossier City, Louisiana, United States	Catchweight (165 lbs) bout.
Win	2–0	Brenton Taylor	TKO (punches)	Pain on the Cane 3	November 12, 2011	1	4:40	Natchitoches, Louisiana, United States	
Win	1–0	Cosmo Alexandre	Decision (unanimous)	Bellator 52	October 1, 2011	3	5:00	Lake Charles, Louisiana, United States	

== Karate Combat record ==
Professional record breakdown
9 matches	6 wins	3 losses
By knockout	3	1
By decision	3	2
Draws	0	

Result	Record	Opponent	Method	Event	Date	Rd.	Time	Location	Notes
Loss	6–3	Rafael Aghayev	Decision (unanimous)	Karate Combat 40	June 24, 2023	5	3:00	Miami, Florida	For the undisputed Karate Combat Welterweight Championship.
Loss	6–2	Luiz Rocha	Decision (majority)	Karate Combat 35	August 27, 2022	5	3:00	Orlando, Florida	Superfight.
Win	6–1	Dionicio Gustavo	Decision (unanimous)	Karate Combat: Okinawa	July 11, 2021	5	3:00	Unknown	Retains Karate Combat Welterweight Championship.
Win	5–1	Jerome Brown	KO	Karate Combat: Scrap Punk	October 25, 2020	3	2:38	Unknown	Wins Karate Combat Welterweight Championship.
Win	4–1	Reda Messaoudi	KO	Karate Combat: Anger Wat	October 4, 2019	1	2:19	Unknown	
Win	3–1	Dionicio Gustavo	Decision	Karate Combat: Evolution	September 21, 2019	3	3:00	Orlando, Florida	
Win	2–1	Vitalie Certan	Decision (unanimous)	Karate Combat: One World	September 27, 2018	3	3:00	New York City, New York	
Win	1–1	Muslum Basturk	TKO	Karate Combat: Inception	April 26, 2018	1		Miami, Florida	
Loss	0–1	Abdalla Ibrahim	KO (punch)	Karate Combat: Genesis	February 2, 2018	1		Budapest, Hungary	
