= Ricky Glenn =

American mixed martial artist

- Born: April 12, 1989 (age 37); Marshalltown, Iowa, United States
- Other names: The Gladiator
- Height: 6 ft 0 in (1.83 m)
- Weight: 155 lb (70 kg; 11 st 1 lb)
- Division: Lightweight; Featherweight
- Reach: 70 in (178 cm)
- Style: Wrestling, Boxing, BJJ
- Fighting out of: Des Moines, Iowa, United States
- Team: Roufusport (2010–2017); Team Alpha Male (2017–2019); Pura Vida; 360 BJJ; Absolute MMA and Fitness (2019–present)
- Trainer: Duke Roufus (formerly)
- Rank: Black belt in Brazilian Jiu-Jitsu
- Years active: 2006–present

Mixed martial arts record
- Total: 33
- Wins: 22
- By knockout: 13
- By submission: 3
- By decision: 6
- Losses: 9
- By knockout: 2
- By submission: 2
- By decision: 5
- Draws: 2

Other information
- Mixed martial arts record from Sherdog

Ricky Glenn (born April 12, 1989) is an American mixed martial artist who competed in the Lightweight division of the UFC. A professional since 2006, he is the former World Series of Fighting Featherweight Champion.

== Background ==
Glenn was born in Marshalltown, Iowa. Growing up he had an interest in BMX biking but the interest in fighting outweighed biking since he was young. He did a year of wrestling at Marshalltown High School and started training boxing when he was fourteen. When his local boxing gym closed down, he travelled 90 minutes each trip to another gym to get his boxing practice. He later transitioned to MMA training at a friend's basement and switch to his uncle's garage.

I came from nothing, like a lot of people, There’s a lot of drugs where I come from, a lot of poverty....It took a while, but here I am.........I wanted to live the American Dream.

When Glenn was seventeen, still a high school student and with one year wrestling, some boxing experience and self-taught MMA skills, he was asked to fight on a short notice for a local promotion. Still in his work uniform, Glenn left his work at a local Staples shift early in Marshalltown, rushing out to the venue, in time for a few stretches, and stepped in the cage 5 minutes later, winning his first fight. This win set of his MMA career where he put it “He was a tough guy, but I cut him up really good. I was shocked, I mean, I was fighting for my life in there. I was fighting grown men when I was in high school, and that first win meant everything.”

After high school, Glenn moved to Cedar Rapids and attended a community college, majoring in physical therapy. He joined an MMA gym under Duke Roufus' guidance where his training partner was Erik Kock and Ben Askren.

Glenn fought 17 amateur fights in a short period with record of 15–1–1 and he would go on to fight 21 times professionally, losing only 3 bouts, and 97% of his wins have been by way of knockout, submission, or TKO prior signed by UFC. He moved to Milwaukee and left his employment at Costco to train full-time.

== Mixed martial arts career ==
=== Early career ===
Glenn fought most of the fights in regional Midwest of American. He was the World Series of Fighting (WSOF) featherweight champion and Midwest Cage Fight featherweight champion. Glenn amassed a record of 18–3–1 prior signed by UFC. In his past 17 bouts, Glenn's only loss was to WSOF featherweight champion Lance Palmer, and he held notable victories over Johnny Case and Georgi Karakhanyan.

=== Ultimate Fighting Championship ===
Glenn made his promotion debut on September 17, 2016 at UFC Fight Night: Poirier vs. Johnson against Evan Dunham in Texas. He moved up to lightweight for this fight bout replacing injured Abel Trujillo on 12 days notice. He was bested by Dunham via unanimous decision and this unsuccessful debut snapped a three-fight winning streak since losing his WSOF title to Lance Palmer in 2014.

He next faced Phillipe Nover on February 11, 2017 at UFC 208. He outpointed Nover and win via split decision (27-30, 29–28, 29-28).

Glenn faced Gavin Tucker on September 9, 2017 at UFC 215. He won the fight by unanimous decision. Tucker suffered four broken bones on his face during the one-sided beating from Glenn and many criticized the referee, Kyle Cardinal, for not stopping the fight.

Glenn faced Myles Jury on December 30, 2017 at UFC 219. He lost the fight by unanimous decision.

Glenn faced Dennis Bermudez on July 14, 2018 at UFC Fight Night 133. He won the fight via split decision.

Glenn was scheduled to face Arnold Allen on November 30, 2018 at The Ultimate Fighter 28 Finale. However, Allen pulled out of the fight on November 16 citing a cut he received while training, and he was replaced by Kevin Aguilar. At the weigh-ins, Glenn weighed in at 148.5 pounds, 2.5 pounds over the featherweight non-title fight limit of 146. He was fined 20 percent of their purse, which went to his opponent Kevin Aguilar. The bout proceeded at catchweight. Glenn lost the fight via unanimous decision.

==== Move up to Lightweight ====
Glenn was scheduled to face Carlton Minus on December 19, 2020 at UFC Fight Night 183. However during fight week, it was announced that Glenn had to be pulled out of the bout.

Glenn faced Joaquim Silva on June 19, 2021 at UFC on ESPN 25. He won the bout via knockout just 37 seconds into the first round. The fight marked the last of his prevailing contract, and he subsequently signed a new, four-fight contract with the UFC.

Glenn faced Grant Dawson on October 23, 2021 at UFC Fight Night: Costa vs. Vettori. The fight ended in majority draw. 8 out of 11 media outlets scored the bout for Dawson.

Glenn was scheduled to face Drew Dober on March 12, 2022 at UFC Fight Night 203. However, a week before the event, Glenn withdrew due to a torn groin and was replaced by Terrance McKinney.

Glenn faced Christos Giagos on April 22, 2023, at UFC Fight Night 222. He lost the fight by technical knockout in the first round.

Glenn faced Drew Dober on October 7, 2023, at UFC Fight Night 229. He lost the fight via technical knockout in round one.

==== Move up to Welterweight ====
Glenn faced Song Kenan in a welterweight bout on August 17, 2024 at UFC 305. He lost the fight by unanimous decision.

On October 9, 2024, it was reported that Glenn was removed from the UFC roster.

== Personal life ==
Glenn's moniker "The Gladiator" was given to him by his uncle for his killer instinct demeanour inside the boxing ring.

Glenn and his wife Jenny have a son.

== Championships and accomplishments ==
- Ultimate Fighting Championship
  - Fight of the Night (One time) vs. Evan Dunham
- World Series of Fighting
  - WSOF Featherweight Championship (One time; former)
- Midwest Cage Fight
  - Midwest Cage Fight Featherweight Champion (One time; former)

== Mixed martial arts record ==
Professional record breakdown
33 matches	22 wins	9 losses
By knockout	13	2
By submission	3	2
By decision	6	5
Draws	2	

Res.	Record	Opponent	Method	Event	Date	Round	Time	Location	Notes
Loss	22–9–2	Song Kenan	Decision (unanimous)	UFC 305	August 18, 2024	3	5:00	Perth, Australia	Welterweight debut.
Loss	22–8–2	Drew Dober	TKO (punches)	UFC Fight Night: Dawson vs. Green	October 7, 2023	1	2:36	Las Vegas, Nevada, United States	
Loss	22–7–2	Christos Giagos	KO (punch)	UFC Fight Night: Pavlovich vs. Blaydes	April 22, 2023	1	1:35	Las Vegas, Nevada, United States	
Draw	22–6–2	Grant Dawson	Draw (majority)	UFC Fight Night: Costa vs. Vettori	October 23, 2021	3	5:00	Las Vegas, Nevada, United States	
Win	22–6–1	Joaquim Silva	KO (punches)	UFC on ESPN: The Korean Zombie vs. Ige	June 19, 2021	1	0:37	Las Vegas, Nevada, United States	Return to Lightweight.
Loss	21–6–1	Kevin Aguilar	Decision (unanimous)	The Ultimate Fighter: Heavy Hitters Finale	November 30, 2018	3	5:00	Las Vegas, Nevada, United States	Catchweight (148.5 lb) bout; Glenn missed weight.
Win	21–5–1	Dennis Bermudez	Decision (split)	UFC Fight Night: dos Santos vs. Ivanov	July 14, 2018	3	5:00	Boise, Idaho, United States	
Loss	20–5–1	Myles Jury	Decision (unanimous)	UFC 219	December 30, 2017	3	5:00	Las Vegas, Nevada, United States	
Win	20–4–1	Gavin Tucker	Decision (unanimous)	UFC 215	September 9, 2017	3	5:00	Edmonton, Alberta, Canada	
Win	19–4–1	Phillipe Nover	Decision (split)	UFC 208	February 11, 2017	3	5:00	Brooklyn, New York, United States	
Loss	18–4–1	Evan Dunham	Decision (unanimous)	UFC Fight Night: Poirier vs. Johnson	September 17, 2016	3	5:00	Hidalgo, Texas, United States	Lightweight bout; Fight of the Night.
Win	18–3–1	Ramiro Hernandez	Decision (split)	Victory Fighting Championship 51	June 24, 2016	3	5:00	Urbandale, Iowa, United States	
Win	17–3–1	Chris Manuel	TKO (body punches)	Pure Fighting Championship 3	March 19, 2016	3	2:03	Milwaukee, Wisconsin, United States	
Win	16–3–1	Adam Ward	KO (punches)	WSOF 24	October 17, 2015	2	1:27	Mashantucket, Connecticut, United States	
Loss	15–3–1	Lance Palmer	Submission (rear-naked choke)	WSOF 16	December 13, 2014	3	3:09	Sacramento, California, United States	Lost the WSOF Featherweight Championship.
Win	15–2–1	Georgi Karakhanyan	TKO (retirement)	WSOF 10	June 21, 2014	2	5:00	Las Vegas, Nevada, United States	Won the WSOF Featherweight Championship.
Win	14–2–1	Artur Rofi	Decision (unanimous)	WSOF 5	September 14, 2013	3	5:00	Atlantic City, New Jersey, United States	
Win	13–2–1	Alexandre Pimentel	KO (punches)	WSOF 2	March 23, 2013	3	1:51	Atlantic City, New Jersey, United States	
Win	12–2–1	Lyndon Whitlock	TKO (knees to the body and punches)	Score Fighting Series 6	October 19, 2012	3	2:34	Sarnia, Ontario, Canada	
Win	11–2–1	Tristan Johnson	TKO (punches)	Score Fighting Series 5	August 25, 2012	2	4:26	Hamilton, Ontario, Canada	
Win	10–2–1	Charon Spain	TKO (elbow and punches)	North American FC: Colosseum	May 4, 2012	2	0:29	Milwaukee, Wisconsin, United States	
Win	9–2–1	Jose Pacheco	Decision (unanimous)	North American FC: Unleashed	November 18, 2011	3	5:00	Milwaukee, Wisconsin, United States	
Win	8–2–1	Gustavo Rodriguez	TKO (punches)	KOTC: Interference	October 8, 2011	2	1:46	Lac du Flambeau, Wisconsin, United States	
Draw	7–2–1	Ryan Roberts	Draw	Midwest Cage Fight 35	August 5, 2011	5	5:00	Des Moines, Iowa, United States	
Win	7–2	Josh Henry	Submission (triangle choke)	Midwest Cage Fight 32	March 5, 2011	1	3:41	Des Moines, Iowa, United States	
Win	6–2	Josh Henry	Submission (armbar)	Midwest Cage Fight 31	January 15, 2011	1	0:32	Des Moines, Iowa, United States	
Win	5–2	Johnny Case	TKO (punches)	Midwest Cage Fight 29	October 22, 2010	1	4:07	Des Moines, Iowa, United States	
Win	4–2	Colby Karadios	TKO (punches)	Midwest Cage Fight 27	June 11, 2010	1	2:49	Des Moines, Iowa, United States	
Loss	3–2	Lonnie Scriven	Decision (split)	Midwest Cage Fight 25	March 13, 2010	3	5:00	Des Moines, Iowa, United States	
Win	3–1	Joe Morris	Submission (triangle choke)	Midwest Cage Fight 24	January 24, 2010	1	4:57	Des Moines, Iowa, United States	
Loss	2–1	Jimmy Seipel	Submission (armbar)	Victory FC 28	July 24, 2009	1	2:31	Council Bluffs, Iowa, United States	
Win	2–0	Ted Reynolds	TKO (punches)	War Party Cage Fighting 4	November 11, 2006	1	1:56	Marshalltown, Iowa, United States	
Win	1–0	Bob Morgan	TKO (submission to punches)	War Party Cage Fighting 3	July 29, 2006	2	2:25	Marshalltown, Iowa, United States	

== See also ==
- List of male mixed martial artists
