= UFC on Fox: Werdum vs. Browne =

UFC mixed martial arts event in 2014

- The poster for UFC on Fox: Werdum vs. Browne
- Promotion: Ultimate Fighting Championship
- Date: April 19, 2014
- Venue: Amway Center
- City: Orlando, Florida
- Attendance: 14,410
- Total gate: $1,651,776

Event chronology
The Ultimate Fighter Nations Finale: Bisping vs. Kennedy	UFC on Fox: Werdum vs. Browne	UFC 172: Jones vs. Teixeira

UFC on Fox: Werdum vs. Browne (also known as UFC on Fox 11) was a mixed martial arts event held by the Ultimate Fighting Championship on April 19, 2014, at the Amway Center in Orlando, Florida.

== Background ==
The event was headlined by a heavyweight number one contenders bout between Fabrício Werdum and Travis Browne.

Sean Soriano was expected to face Estevan Payan at this event. However, Soriano was forced to pull out due to injury and was replaced by Mike Brown. In turn, Brown was forced out of the bout and was replaced by promotional newcomer Alex White.

Amanda Nunes was expected to face UFC newcomer Alexis Dufresne on this card, but the bout was cancelled when Dufresne was injured.

Santiago Ponzinibbio was expected to face Jordan Mein at this event. However, Ponzinibbio was removed from the bout and was replaced by Hernani Perpetuo.

Josh Samman was expected to face Caio Magalhães at the event. However, on April 8, Samman pulled out of the bout citing a hamstring injury and was replaced by promotional newcomer Luke Zachrich.

The event had an average of 2.5 million viewers with 3.3 million viewers during the main event.

== Results ==
Main Card (Fox)
Weight class				Method	Round	Time	Notes
Heavyweight	Fabrício Werdum	def.	Travis Browne	Decision (unanimous) (49–46, 50–45, 50–45)	5	5:00	(Note: UFC Heavyweight Championship title eliminator)
Women's Bantamweight	Miesha Tate	def.	Liz Carmouche	Decision (unanimous) (29–28, 29–28, 29–28)	3	5:00
Lightweight	Donald Cerrone	def.	Edson Barboza	Submission (rear-naked choke)	1	3:15
Middleweight	Yoel Romero	def.	Brad Tavares	Decision (unanimous) (30–27, 30–27, 30–27)	3	5:00
Preliminary card (Fox Sports 1)
Lightweight	Khabib Nurmagomedov	def.	Rafael dos Anjos	Decision (unanimous) (30–27, 30–27, 30–27)	3	5:00
Welterweight	Thiago Alves	def.	Seth Baczynski	Decision (unanimous) (30–27, 30–27, 30–27)	3	5:00
Lightweight	Jorge Masvidal	def.	Pat Healy	Decision (unanimous) (30–27, 30–27, 29–28)	3	5:00
Featherweight	Alex White	def.	Estevan Payan	TKO (punches)	1	1:28
Middleweight	Caio Magalhães	def.	Luke Zachrich	TKO (punches)	1	0:44
Welterweight	Jordan Mein	def.	Hernani Perpétuo	Decision (split) (28–29, 29–28, 29–28)	3	5:00
Preliminary card (UFC Fight Pass)
Flyweight	Dustin Ortiz	def.	Ray Borg	Decision (split) (28–29, 29–28, 29–28)	3	5:00
Featherweight	Mirsad Bektić	def.	Chas Skelly	Decision (majority) (29–27, 29–27, 28–28)	3	5:00	(Note: Skelly was docked 1 point in the second round for an illegal knee.)
Heavyweight	Derrick Lewis	def.	Jack May	TKO (punches)	1	4:23

== Bonus awards ==
The following fighters received $50,000 bonuses:

- Fight of the Night: Thiago Alves vs. Seth Baczynski
- Performance of the Night: Donald Cerrone and Alex White

== Reported payout ==
The following is the reported payout to the fighters as reported to the Florida State Boxing Commission. It does not include sponsor money and also does not include the UFC's traditional "fight night" bonuses.

- Fabrício Werdum: $175,000 (includes $50,000 win bonus) def. Travis Browne: $50,000
- Miesha Tate: $56,000 (includes $28,000 win bonus) def. Liz Carmouche: $17,000
- Donald Cerrone: $114,000 (includes $57,000 win bonus) def. Edson Barboza: $29,000
- Yoel Romero: $50,000 (includes $25,000 win bonus) def. Brad Tavares: $19,000
- Khabib Nurmagomedov: $64,000 (includes $32,000 win bonus) def. Rafael dos Anjos: $21,000
- Thiago Alves: $78,000 (includes $39,000 win bonus) def. Seth Baczynski: $20,000
- Jorge Masvidal: $78,000 (includes $39,000 win bonus) def. Pat Healy: $25,000
- Alex White: $16,000 (includes $8,000 win bonus) def. Estevan Payan: $10,000
- Caio Magalhaes: $24,000 (includes $12,000 win bonus) def. Luke Zachrich: $8,000
- Jordan Mein: $36,000 (includes $18,000 win bonus) def. Hernani Perpetuo: $8,000
- Dustin Ortiz: $20,000 (includes $10,000 win bonus) def. Ray Borg: $8,000
- Mirsad Bektić: $16,000 (includes $8,000 win bonus) def. Chas Skelly: $8,000
- Derrick Lewis: $16,000 (includes $8,000 win bonus) def. Jack May: $8,000

== See also ==
- List of UFC events
- 2014 in UFC
