= Chris Beal =

American mixed martial arts fighter

- Born: August 6, 1985 (age 41); Ventura, California, U.S.
- Other names: The Real Deal
- Height: 5 ft 8 in (1.73 m)
- Weight: 135 lb (61 kg; 9 st 9 lb)
- Division: Flyweight; Bantamweight; Featherweight
- Reach: 69 1/2 in (177 cm)
- Style: Freestyle wrestling
- Fighting out of: Ventura, California, U.S.
- Team: Knuckleheads Boxing Royal Sports Management
- Years active: 2009-present

Mixed martial arts record
- Total: 18
- Wins: 11
- By knockout: 3
- By decision: 8
- Losses: 7
- By knockout: 3
- By submission: 1
- By decision: 3

Other information
- Mixed martial arts record from Sherdog

Chris Beal (born August 6, 1985) is an American mixed martial artist who formerly competed in the Bantamweight division of the Ultimate Fighting Championship.

== Background ==
Beal wrestled at Ventura High School where he placed second at the state championship for freestyle wrestling and was a CIF champion. Beal then attended Junior College for two years, one year at Moorpark College and one year at Ventura College. He started training MMA in 2006 after watching a high school friend compete in a mixed martial arts fight.

== Mixed martial arts career ==
=== Early career ===
Beal began his professional mixed martial arts career on July 3, 2009, against Andrew Dominquez at CA Fight Syndicate - Throwdown at the Showdown 1, where he won via decision. He then got a unanimous decision win against Vincent Martinez on October 2, 2009, at CA Fight Syndicate - Throwdown at the Showdown 2.

=== BAMMA USA ===
Beal made his BAMMA USA debut on August 20, 2011, facing Evan Esguerra at Badbeat 3. He won the fight via split decision. He then faced Jimmy Jones at Badbeat 4 on January 13, 2012. Beal won the fight via split decision, extending his BAMMA record to 2–0. For his third fight in the promotion, Beal faced Jose Morales at Badbeat 5 on March 16, 2012. He won via TKO due to elbows in the first round.

In his next fight, Beal took on Kana Hyatt on July 13, 2012, at Badbeat 6. He won the fight via unanimous decision. Beal then faced Shad Smith at Badbeat 7 on October 12, 2012. He won the fight via unanimous decision, and would subsequently take a hiatus to take part on The Ultimate Fighter.

After his brief stint on The Ultimate Fighter, Beal returned to BAMMA USA at Badbeat 12 taking on Keith Carson. He won via TKO in the second round.

=== The Ultimate Fighter ===
On August 15, 2013, it was revealed that Beal would take part in the 18th season of The Ultimate Fighter, with coaches Miesha Tate & UFC Women's Bantamweight Champion Ronda Rousey.

In the first episode, Beal faced Sirwan Kakai to get into the house, defeating him via unanimous decision after two rounds. Beal was chosen as the first male pick for Team Rousey.

In his second bout on the show, Beal faced Team Tate's #1 pick Chris Holdsworth. Beal was submitted in the first round via guillotine choke.

=== Ultimate Fighting Championship ===
Despite being eliminated early on the show, Beal was signed by the UFC. He made his promotional debut on April 26, 2014, at UFC 172 taking on fellow newcomer Patrick Williams. Beal won the fight via knockout due to a flying knee in the second round, which earned Performance of the Night honors.

For his second bout with the promotion, Beal was expected to face Rob Font on September 5, 2014, at UFC Fight Night 50. However, Font pulled out of the bout citing an injury. Subsequently, Beal was briefly paired with Dustin Kimura at the event. In turn, Kimura also pulled out of the bout and was replaced by Tateki Matsuda. Beal defeated Matsuda via unanimous decision.

Beal faced Neil Seery in a flyweight bout on January 24, 2015, at UFC on Fox 14. He lost the back-and-forth fight by unanimous decision.

Beal next faced Chris Kelades on August 23, 2015, at UFC Fight Night 74. He lost the fight via split decision.

Beal was expected to face Norifumi Yamamoto in a bantamweight bout on June 18, 2016, at UFC Fight Night 89. However, Yamamoto was scratched from the bout on May 26 for an undisclosed injury. He was replaced by Joe Soto. He lost the back and forth fight via submission in the third round and was subsequently released from the promotion.

=== Post UFC ===
After losing to Alfred Khashakyan via TKO stoppage in the first round at CXF 5, Beal faced John Castañeda, losing via TKO in the second round at Combate Americas 14.

After going 1-1 on the regional scene, Beal faced Josh Rettinghouse at XMMA 5 on July 23, 2022. He lost the fight in the first round after being knocked out.

== Championships and achievements ==
=== Mixed martial arts ===
- Ultimate Fighting Championship
  - Performance of the Night (One time)
  - UFC.com Awards
    - 2014: Ranked #2 Knockout of the Year vs. Patrick Williams
- ESPN
  - 2014 Knockout of the Year vs. Patrick Williams at UFC 172
- MMAJunkie.com
  - 2014 April Knockout of the Month vs. Patrick Williams

== Mixed martial arts record ==
Professional record breakdown
18 matches	11 wins	7 losses
By knockout	3	3
By submission	0	1
By decision	8	3

Res.	Record	Opponent	Method	Event	Date	Round	Time	Location	Notes
Loss	11–7	Josh Rettinghouse	KO (punches)	XMMA 5	July 23, 2022	1	2:10	Columbia, South Carolina, United States	
Win	11–6	James Acosta	Decision (unanimous)	WFC 136	April 2, 2022	3	5:00	Santa Ynez, California, United States	
Loss	10–6	George Garcia	Decision (majority)	CXF 12: Burbank Beatdown	April 21, 2018	3	5:00	Burbank, California, United States	For the CXF Bantamweight Championship.
Loss	10–5	John Castañeda	TKO (punches)	Combate 14: Cinco de Mayo	May 5, 2017	2	0:42	Ventura, California, United States	
Loss	10–4	Alfred Khashakyan	TKO (punches)	CXF 5: Night of Champions	December 17, 2016	1	2:56	Studio City, California, United States	For the CXF Bantamweight Championship.
Loss	10–3	Joe Soto	Submission (rear-naked choke)	UFC Fight Night: MacDonald vs. Thompson	June 18, 2016	3	3:39	Ottawa, Ontario, Canada	Return to Bantamweight.
Loss	10–2	Chris Kelades	Decision (split)	UFC Fight Night: Holloway vs. Oliveira	August 23, 2015	3	5:00	Saskatoon, Saskatchewan, Canada	
Loss	10–1	Neil Seery	Decision (unanimous)	UFC on Fox: Gustafsson vs. Johnson	January 24, 2015	3	5:00	Stockholm, Sweden	Flyweight debut.
Win	10–0	Tateki Matsuda	Decision (unanimous)	UFC Fight Night: Jacare vs. Mousasi	September 5, 2014	3	5:00	Mashantucket, Connecticut, United States	
Win	9–0	Patrick Williams	KO (flying knee)	UFC 172	April 26, 2014	2	1:51	Baltimore, Maryland, United States	Performance of the Night.
Win	8–0	Keith Carson	TKO (punches)	BAMMA USA - Badbeat 12	March 28, 2014	2	4:37	Commerce, California, United States	
Win	7–0	Shad Smith	Decision (unanimous)	BAMMA USA - Badbeat 7	October 12, 2012	3	5:00	Commerce, California, United States	
Win	6–0	Kana Hyatt	Decision (unanimous)	BAMMA USA - Badbeat 6	July 13, 2012	3	5:00	Commerce, California, United States	
Win	5–0	Jose Morales	TKO (elbows)	BAMMA USA - Badbeat 5	March 16, 2012	1	4:45	Commerce, California, United States	
Win	4–0	Jimmy Jones	Decision (split)	BAMMA USA - Badbeat 4 & the ALFA League 8	January 13, 2012	3	5:00	Commerce, California, United States	
Win	3–0	Evan Esguerra	Decision (split)	BAMMA USA - Badbeat 3 & the ALFA League 6	August 20, 2011	3	5:00	Commerce, California, United States	
Win	2–0	Vincent Martinez	Decision (unanimous)	CA Fight Syndicate - Throwdown at the Showdown 2	October 2, 2009	3	3:00	Santa Barbara, California, United States	
Win	1–0	Andrew Dominquez	Decision (unanimous)	CA Fight Syndicate - Throwdown at the Showdown 1	July 3, 2009	3	3:00	Santa Barbara, California, United States	

=== Mixed martial arts exhibition record ===
Res.	Record	Opponent	Method	Event	Date	Round	Time	Location	Notes
Loss	1–1	Chris Holdsworth	Submission (guillotine choke)	The Ultimate Fighter: Team Rousey vs. Team Tate	September 18, 2013 (airdate)	1	4:16	Las Vegas, Nevada, United States	The Ultimate Fighter 18 Preliminary round
Win	1–0	Sirwan Kakai	Decision (unanimous)	The Ultimate Fighter: Team Rousey vs. Team Tate	September 4, 2013 (airdate)	2	5:00	Las Vegas, Nevada, United States	The Ultimate Fighter 18 Elimination round

== See also ==
- List of current UFC fighters
- List of male mixed martial artists
