= Kevin Aguilar (martial artist) =

American mixed martial arts fighter

- Born: September 7, 1988 (age 38)
- Other names: The Angel of Death
- Height: 5 ft 7 in (1.70 m)
- Weight: 145 lb (66 kg; 10 st 5 lb)
- Division: Featherweight
- Reach: 73 in (185 cm)
- Fighting out of: Longview, Texas, United States
- Team: Longview MMA; Team 515
- Rank: Purple belt in Brazilian Jiu-Jitsu
- Years active: 2010–present

Mixed martial arts record
- Total: 22
- Wins: 17
- By knockout: 10
- By submission: 1
- By decision: 6
- Losses: 5
- By knockout: 2
- By decision: 3

Other information
- Mixed martial arts record from Sherdog

Kevin Aguilar (born September 7, 1988) is an American mixed martial artist (MMA). Aguilar was the Legacy Fighting Alliance (LFA) Featherweight champion and he competed in the featherweight division in the Ultimate Fighting Championship (UFC).

== Mixed martial arts career ==
=== Early career ===
Aguilar started his professional MMA career since 2010 and fought under various promoters in the southern region of United States. He amassed a record of 15–1 and won the Legacy Fighting Alliance Featherweight championship prior participated in Dana White's Tuesday Night Contender Series.

=== Dana White's Tuesday Night Contender Series ===
Aguilar appeared in Dana White's Contender Series 12 web-series program. He faced Joey Gomez on July 10, 2018, and won the fight via unanimous decision. Even with the win, Aguilar was not offered a contract on show but he was brought in to face Ricky Glenn at The Ultimate Fighter 28 Finale.

=== Ultimate Fighting Championship ===
Aguilar made his UFC debut on November 30, 2018, replacing an injured Arnold Allen, at The Ultimate Fighter 28 Finale against Ricky Glenn. At the weigh-ins, Glenn weighed in at 148.5 pounds, 2.5 pounds over the featherweight non-title fight limit of 146. He was fined 20 percent of his purse, which went to Aguilar. The bout proceeded at a catchweight. Aguilar won the fight via unanimous decision.

His next fight came on March 30, 2019, at UFC on ESPN 2 against Enrique Barzola. He won the fight via unanimous decision.

Aguilar faced Dan Ige on June 22, 2019, at UFC Fight Night 154 He lost the fight via unanimous decision.

Aguilar faced Zubaira Tukhugov on February 23, 2020, at UFC Fight Night 168. He lost the fight via TKO in the first round.

Aguilar faced Charles Rosa on June 13, 2020, at UFC on ESPN: Eye vs. Calvillo. He lost the fight via split decision.

Aguilar faced Tucker Lutz at UFC 262 on May 15, 2021. He lost the bout via unanimous decision.

== Championships and accomplishments ==
- Legacy Fighting Alliance
  - Legacy Fighting Alliance Featherweight Champion (Two times)Justin Rader and Thanh Le

== Mixed martial arts record ==
Professional record breakdown
22 matches	17 wins	5 losses
By knockout	10	2
By submission	1	0
By decision	6	3

Res.	Record	Opponent	Method	Event	Date	Round	Time	Location	Notes
Loss	17–5	Tucker Lutz	Decision (unanimous)	UFC 262	May 15, 2021	3	5:00	Houston, Texas, United States	
Loss	17–4	Charles Rosa	Decision (split)	UFC on ESPN: Eye vs. Calvillo	June 13, 2020	3	5:00	Las Vegas, Nevada, United States	Lightweight bout.
Loss	17–3	Zubaira Tukhugov	TKO (punches)	UFC Fight Night: Felder vs. Hooker	February 23, 2020	1	3:21	Auckland, New Zealand	
Loss	17–2	Dan Ige	Decision (unanimous)	UFC Fight Night: Moicano vs. The Korean Zombie	June 22, 2019	3	5:00	Greenville, South Carolina, United States	
Win	17–1	Enrique Barzola	Decision (unanimous)	UFC on ESPN: Barboza vs. Gaethje	March 30, 2019	3	5:00	Philadelphia, Pennsylvania, United States	
Win	16–1	Ricky Glenn	Decision (unanimous)	The Ultimate Fighter: Heavy Hitters Finale	November 30, 2018	3	5:00	Las Vegas, Nevada, United States	
Win	15–1	Joey Gomez	Decision (split)	Dana White's Contender Series 12	July 10, 2018	3	5:00	Las Vegas, Nevada, United States	Lightweight bout.
Win	14–1	Thanh Le	KO (punches)	LFA 40	May 25, 2018	1	2:44	Dallas, Texas, United States	Defended and unified the LFA Featherweight Championship.
Win	13–1	Justin Rader	Decision (unanimous)	LFA 18	August 4, 2017	5	5:00	Shawnee, Oklahoma, United States	Defended the LFA Featherweight Championship.
Win	12–1	Damon Jackson	KO (punches)	LFA 4	February 17, 2017	3	4:05	Bossier City, Louisiana, United States	Won the inaugural LFA Featherweight Championship.
Win	11–1	Tony Kelley	Decision (split)	Legacy FC 57	July 1, 2016	5	5:00	Bossier City, Louisiana, United States	Won the vacant Legacy FC Featherweight Championship.
Win	10–1	David Bosnick	TKO (submission to punches)	Legacy FC 49	March 28, 2015	2	2:04	Bossier City, Louisiana, United States	
Win	9–1	Alex Black	TKO (punches)	Legacy FC 39	February 27, 2015	3	3:13	Houston, Texas, United States	
Loss	8–1	Leonard Garcia	TKO (punches)	Legacy FC 26	December 6, 2013	1	2:57	San Antonio, Texas, United States	For the vacant Legacy FC Featherweight Championship.
Win	8–0	Hunter Tucker	Submission (ambar)	Legacy FC 19	April 12, 2013	1	2:24	Dallas, Texas, United States	Return to Featherweight.
Win	7–0	Nick Gonzalez	Decision (unanimous)	Legacy FC 17	February 1, 2013	3	5:00	San Antonio, Texas, United States	Lightweight bout.
Win	6–0	Calvin Miller	TKO (punches)	Ascend Combat: Mayhem 2	May 19, 2012	3	4:26	Shreveport, Louisiana, United States	
Win	5–0	Rey Trujillo	TKO (punches from top-side triangle)	Ascend Combat: Nothing Personal	March 28, 2012	2	3:45	Shreveport, Louisiana, United States	
Win	4–0	Nate Murdock	TKO (punches)	Xtreme Fight Night 5	March 28, 2011	3	1:16	Tulsa, Oklahoma, United States	
Win	3–0	Ronald Jacobs	TKO (punches)	FLABBP Round 3: Night of Champions	March 28, 2011	2	2:35	Gonzales, Louisiana, United States	
Win	2–0	Matt Hunt	TKO (punches)	Bellator 36	March 12, 2011	1	3:02	Shreveport, Louisiana, United States	Catchweight (150 lb) bout.
Win	1–0	Chris Shumake	TKO (punches)	Ascend Combat: Season's Beatings 2	December 3, 2010	1	3:28	Shreveport, Louisiana, United States	

== See also ==
- List of male mixed martial artists
