= Caio Magalhães =

Brazilian mixed martial arts fighter

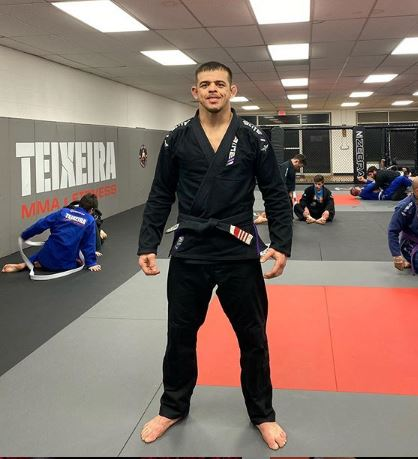
- Born: December 14, 1987 (age 38); Sobral, Ceará, Brazil
- Other names: Hellboy, Monstro
- Height: 6 ft 1 in (1.85 m)
- Weight: 186 lb (84 kg; 13.3 st)
- Division: Light Heavyweight; Middleweight
- Reach: 73 in (185 cm)
- Stance: Orthodox
- Fighting out of: Fortaleza, Ceará, Brazil; Bethel, Connecticut, United States
- Team: Teixeira MMA & Fitness; Champs Boxing Club
- Rank: Black belt in Brazilian Jiu-Jitsu
- Years active: 2009-present

Mixed martial arts record
- Total: 17
- Wins: 10
- By knockout: 3
- By submission: 4
- By decision: 3
- Losses: 7
- By knockout: 2
- By submission: 1
- By decision: 4

Other information
- Mixed martial arts record from Sherdog

Caio Magalhães (born December 14, 1987) is a Brazilian professional mixed martial artist who most recently competed in the Middleweight division of the Professional Fighters League. A professional competitor since 2009, he has also competed for the UFC and M-1 Global.

== Mixed martial arts career ==
=== Ultimate Fighting Championship ===
Magalhães made his UFC debut on June 8, 2012, at UFC on FX 3 against fellow newcomer Buddy Roberts. He was outstruck throughout the fight by the much faster Roberts and was having significant difficulties trying to take Roberts down as he was fatigued.

Magalhães fought Karlos Vemola on June 8, 2013, at UFC on Fuel TV 10. Despite losing the first round badly, he rallied back to win the fight via rear-naked choke submission in the second round.

Magalhães next faced Nick Ring on December 7, 2013, at UFC Fight Night 33. He won the back-and-forth fight via unanimous decision.

Magalhães was expected to face Josh Samman on April 19, 2014, at UFC on Fox 11. However, on April 8, Samman pulled out of the bout with a hamstring injury. Magalhães instead fought Luke Zachrich. He was victorious via first-round TKO.

Magalhães faced Trevor Smith on November 8, 2014, at UFC Fight Night 56. Magalhães won the fight quickly by knockout in the first round. The stoppage was not without a bit of controversy. Magalhães stunned Smith with a knee and forced a referee stoppage with multiple follow up punches. It appeared that during the final flurry, several hammerfists landed on the back of Smith's head as he lay unconscious on the canvas. Following the match, Magalhães stated "I didn’t notice that," in reference to the strikes to the back of Smith's head. "His coach talked to me after the fight, said I punched the back of his head, but I didn’t notice it. The referee should have stepped in if he saw something, but he was already out from the punch and knee I landed." Magalhães was very briefly scheduled to face Mark Muñoz on February 28, 2015, at UFC 184. However, shortly after the bout was announced by the UFC, Magalhães indicated that he would not be able to compete at the event due to a lingering infection after recent dental surgery, which would require additional surgery. Muñoz eventually stayed on the card against returning veteran Roan Carneiro.

Magalhães next faced Josh Samman on July 12, 2015, at The Ultimate Fighter 21 Finale. He lost the fight via submission in the first round. The NSAC issued a temporary suspension after the fight because he spat in the face of Samman after being submitted, and also in the face of referee John McCarthy.

Magalhães was expected to face Cezar Ferreira on April 16, 2016, at UFC on Fox 19. However, Magalhães pulled out of the fight in the week leading up to the event citing an ankle injury and was replaced by Oluwale Bamgbose.

Magalhães next faced Brad Tavares on September 10, 2016, at UFC 203. He lost the fight via split decision and was subsequently released from the promotion.

== Personal life ==
Magalhaes currently trains and instructs at Teixeira MMA & Fitness.

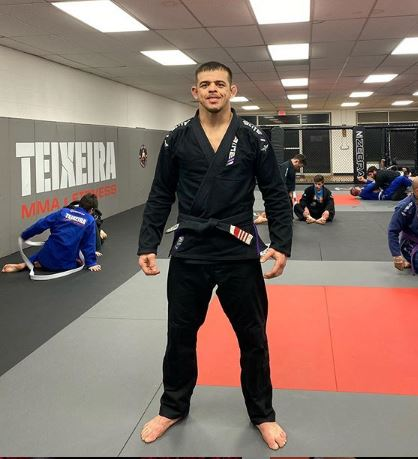
Caio Magalhães at Teixeira MMA & Fitness

== Mixed martial arts record ==
Professional record breakdown
17 matches	10 wins	7 losses
By knockout	3	2
By submission	4	1
By decision	3	4

Res.	Record	Opponent	Method	Event	Date	Round	Time	Location	Notes
Loss	10–7	Eric Spicely	TKO (punches)	CES 55	March 29, 2019	1	4:00	Hartford, Connecticut, United States	
Loss	10–6	Sadibou Sy	KO (head kick and punches)	PFL 7 (2018)	August 30, 2018	1	2:06	Atlantic City, New Jersey, United States	
Loss	10–5	Mikhail Zayats	Decision (unanimous)	M-1 Challenge 91	May 12, 2018	3	5:00	Shenzhen, China	
Loss	10–4	Artem Frolov	Decision (unanimous)	M-1 Challenge 84	October 27, 2017	5	5:00	St. Petersburg, Russia	For the vacant M-1 Global Middleweight Championship.
Win	10–3	Dmitry Voitov	Submission (rear-naked choke)	M-1 Challenge 78	May 26, 2017	1	1:16	Orenburg, Russia	
Loss	9–3	Brad Tavares	Decision (split)	UFC 203	September 10, 2016	3	5:00	Cleveland, Ohio, United States	
Loss	9–2	Josh Samman	Submission (rear-naked choke)	The Ultimate Fighter: American Top Team vs. Blackzilians Finale	July 12, 2015	1	2:52	Las Vegas, Nevada, United States	
Win	9–1	Trevor Smith	KO (knee and punches)	UFC Fight Night: Shogun vs. Saint Preux	November 8, 2014	1	0:31	Uberlândia, Brazil	
Win	8–1	Luke Zachrich	TKO (punches)	UFC on Fox: Werdum vs. Browne	April 19, 2014	1	0:44	Orlando, Florida, United States	
Win	7–1	Nick Ring	Decision (unanimous)	UFC Fight Night: Hunt vs. Bigfoot	December 7, 2013	3	5:00	Brisbane, Australia	
Win	6–1	Karlos Vémola	Submission (rear-naked choke)	UFC on Fuel TV: Nogueira vs. Werdum	June 8, 2013	2	2:49	Fortaleza, Brazil	
Loss	5–1	Buddy Roberts	Decision (unanimous)	UFC on FX: Johnson vs. McCall	June 8, 2012	3	5:00	Sunrise, Florida, United States	
Win	5–0	Ismael de Jesus	Decision (split)	Shooto: Brazil 27	December 2, 2011	3	5:00	Brasília, Brazil	
Win	4–0	Messias Pai de Santo	Submission (rear-naked choke)	AF: Amazon Fight 7	March 3, 2011	1	3:05	Belém, Brazil	
Win	3–0	Otavio Lacerda	TKO (punches)	AF: Amazon Fight 5	October 14, 2010	1	4:58	Belém, Brazil	
Win	2–0	Paulo Henrique Garcia	Decision (split)	IMC: Iron Man Championship 5	March 11, 2010	3	5:00	Belém, Brazil	
Win	1–0	Maurilio de Souza	Submission (omoplata)	Shooto: Brazil 13	August 27, 2009	3	3:25	Fortaleza, Brazil	

== See also ==
- List of current UFC fighters
- List of male mixed martial artists
