= UFC Fight Night: Jacaré vs. Mousasi =

UFC mixed martial arts event in 2014

- The poster for UFC Fight Night: Jacaré vs. Mousasi
- Promotion: Ultimate Fighting Championship
- Date: September 5, 2014
- Venue: Foxwoods Resort Casino
- City: Mashantucket, Connecticut
- Attendance: 4,086
- Total gate: $479,620

Event chronology
UFC 177: Dillashaw vs. Soto	UFC Fight Night: Jacaré vs. Mousasi	UFC Fight Night: Bigfoot vs. Arlovski

UFC Fight Night: Jacaré vs. Mousasi (also known as UFC Fight Night 50) was a mixed martial arts event held on September 5, 2014, at the Foxwoods Resort Casino in Mashantucket, Connecticut.

== Background ==
The event was the fifth the UFC had hosted in Connecticut and the first since UFC 55 in 2005. It was held in Mashantucket, a federally recognized Native American nation in the state of Connecticut.

As a result of the cancellation of UFC 176, a rematch between Gegard Mousasi and Ronaldo Souza was rescheduled for this event and served as the event headliner.

This event marked the first time the Ultimate Fighting Championship and Bellator MMA had live shows (UFC Fight Night 50 and Bellator 123) go against each other on a same night. Additionally, both events were held in venues located within miles of each other.

Initially, bantamweight bouts between Dustin Kimura vs. Ian Entwistle and Chris Beal vs. Rob Font were slated for the event. However, Entwistle and Font each pulled out of the bouts citing injuries. Subsequently, Kimura was briefly rescheduled to face Beal. In turn, Kimura also pulled out of the bout and was replaced by Tateki Matsuda.

Andre Fili was expected to face Sean Soriano at the event. However, Fili was forced from the bout with an injury and replaced by Chas Skelly.

Charles Oliveira weighed in over the 146 pound featherweight limit at 150 pounds. Subsequently, he was forced to surrender 20 percent of his purse to opponent Nik Lentz and the bout was changed to a catchweight affair. In turn, Oliveira was pulled from the event entirely on the day of the event after he fell ill from the effects of the weight cutting process.

== Results ==
Main Card (Fox Sports 1)
Weight class				Method	Round	Time	Notes
Middleweight	Ronaldo Souza	def.	Gegard Mousasi	Submission (guillotine choke)	3	4:30
Heavyweight	Ben Rothwell	def.	Alistair Overeem	TKO (punches)	1	2:19
Heavyweight	Matt Mitrione	def.	Derrick Lewis	KO (punches)	1	0:41
Lightweight	Joe Lauzon	def.	Michael Chiesa	TKO (doctor stoppage)	2	2:14
Preliminary card (Fox Sports 1)
Flyweight	John Moraga	def.	Justin Scoggins	Submission (guillotine choke)	2	0:47
Lightweight	Al Iaquinta	def.	Rodrigo Damm	TKO (punches and elbow)	3	2:26	(Note: Time keeping error was corrected by the Mashantucket Pequot Tribal Nation Gaming Commission & Athletic Division.)
Middleweight	Rafael Natal	def.	Chris Camozzi	Decision (split) (28–29, 29–28, 29–28)	3	5:00
Bantamweight	Chris Beal	def.	Tateki Matsuda	Decision (unanimous) (29–28, 29–28, 30–27)	3	5:00
Featherweight	Chas Skelly	def.	Sean Soriano	Decision (unanimous) (30–27, 30–27, 30–27)	3	5:00

== Bonus awards ==
The following fighters received $50,000 bonuses:

- Fight of the Night: Joe Lauzon vs. Michael Chiesa
- Performance of the Night: Ben Rothwell and Ronaldo Souza

== See also ==
- List of UFC events
- 2014 in UFC
