= UFC 262 =

Mixed martial arts event in 2021

UFC 262: Oliveira vs. Chandler
- The poster for UFC 262: Oliveira vs. Chandler
- Promotion: Ultimate Fighting Championship
- Date: May 15, 2021
- Venue: Toyota Center
- City: Houston, Texas, United States
- Attendance: 16,005
- Total gate: $4,110,000
- Buyrate: 300,000

Event chronology
UFC on ESPN: Rodriguez vs. Waterson	UFC 262: Oliveira vs. Chandler	UFC Fight Night: Font vs. Garbrandt

UFC 262: Oliveira vs. Chandler was a mixed martial arts event produced by the Ultimate Fighting Championship that took place on May 15, 2021, at the Toyota Center in Houston, Texas, United States.

== Background ==
A UFC Lightweight Championship bout for the vacant title between former three-time Bellator Lightweight World Champion Michael Chandler and Charles Oliveira headlined the event. Former champion Khabib Nurmagomedov announced his retirement immediately after defending his title at UFC 254 last October, citing his father's death from complications related to COVID-19 in July as the main reason behind it. Despite his announcement, the title was never officially vacated as UFC President Dana White said several times that he believed Nurmagomedov would still fight again. White finally conceded on March 19 as he confirmed Nurmagomedov's retirement.

A welterweight bout between Leon Edwards and former UFC Lightweight Championship challenger Nate Diaz (also The Ultimate Fighter 5 lightweight winner) was expected to take place at this event. It would've marked the first five-round non-title co-main event in UFC history. However, Diaz pulled out due to a minor injury in early May and the bout was postponed to UFC 263.

A flyweight bout between former UFC Flyweight Championship challenger Alex Perez and Matt Schnell was scheduled for the event. However, Perez was forced to pull out due to undisclosed reasons. He was replaced by Rogério Bontorin and the bout took place at bantamweight. At the weigh-ins, Bontorin weighed in at 137 pounds, one pound over the division's non-title fight limit. The bout proceeded at catchweight and he was fined 20% of his purse, which went to Schnell.

Joel Álvarez was scheduled to face Christos Giagos in a lightweight bout. However, Álvarez was removed from the bout in early May due to alleged visa issues that restricted his travel. Giagos faced returning veteran Sean Soriano instead.

A middleweight bout between Jack Hermansson and Edmen Shahbazyan was expected to take place at this event. However, the bout was postponed to take place one week later at UFC Fight Night: Font vs. Garbrandt due to a COVID-19 case in Hermansson's camp.

On May 14, it was announced that the UFC would be increasing bonuses (Fight of the Night and Performance of the Night) from $50,000 to $75,000. This increase was for this event only and was made at the request of former interim lightweight champion Tony Ferguson (also The Ultimate Fighter: Team Lesnar vs. Team dos Santos welterweight winner), who received a raucous response from the audience in attendance at the UFC 262 pre-fight press conference when he made the proposal.

Several hooligans fought in the stands during this event.

== Results ==
Main card
Weight class				Method	Round	Time	Notes
Lightweight	Charles Oliveira	def.	Michael Chandler	TKO (punches)	2	0:19	(Note: For the vacant UFC Lightweight Championship.)
Lightweight	Beneil Dariush	def.	Tony Ferguson	Decision (unanimous) (30–27, 30–27, 30–27)	3	5:00
Catchweight (137 lb)	Rogério Bontorin	vs.	Matt Schnell	No Contest (overturned)	3	5:00	(Note: Originally a unanimous decision (30–27, 30–27, 29–28) win for Bontorin; overturned after he tested positive for hydrochlorothiazide.)
Women's Flyweight	Katlyn Chookagian	def.	Viviane Araújo	Decision (unanimous) (29–28, 29–28, 30–27)	3	5:00
Featherweight	Edson Barboza	def.	Shane Burgos	KO (punches)	3	1:16
Preliminary card (ESPN / ESPN+)
Middleweight	André Muniz	def.	Ronaldo Souza	Technical Submission (armbar)	1	3:59
Featherweight	Lando Vannata	def.	Mike Grundy	Decision (split) (29–28, 27–30, 30–27)	3	5:00
Middleweight	Jordan Wright	def.	Jamie Pickett	TKO (punches)	1	1:04
Women's Flyweight	Andrea Lee	def.	Antonina Shevchenko	Submission (triangle armbar)	2	4:52
Early preliminary card (ESPN+ / UFC Fight Pass)
Women's Flyweight	Priscila Cachoeira	def.	Gina Mazany	TKO (punches)	2	4:51
Featherweight	Tucker Lutz	def.	Kevin Aguilar	Decision (unanimous) (30–27, 29–28, 29–28)	3	5:00
Lightweight	Christos Giagos	def.	Sean Soriano	Technical Submission (brabo choke)	2	0:59

== Bonus awards ==
The following fighters received $75,000 bonuses.

- Fight of the Night: Edson Barboza vs. Shane Burgos
- Performance of the Night: Charles Oliveira and Christos Giagos

== Aftermath ==
In June 2021, Bontorin was notified by USADA due to a potential doping violation. He tested positive for hydrochlorothiazide, a banned diuretic, in an out-of-competition urine sample in May 2021. Following notification of his positive test, Bontorin provided open containers of two dietary supplements he obtained from a Brazilian compounding pharmacy that he was using prior to his positive test for analysis by a WADA-accredited laboratory. Although no prohibited substances were listed on the supplement product labels, the analysis revealed the presence of HCTZ in the products. He was given a three-month suspension that began on 1 May and his win was overturned to a no contest.

== See also ==
- List of UFC events
- List of current UFC fighters
- 2021 in UFC
