= UFC 172 =

UFC mixed martial arts event in 2014

UFC 172: Jones vs. Teixeira
- The poster for UFC 172: Jones vs. Teixeira
- Promotion: Ultimate Fighting Championship
- Date: April 26, 2014
- Venue: Baltimore Arena
- City: Baltimore, Maryland
- Attendance: 13,485
- Total gate: $2.3 million

Event chronology
UFC on Fox: Werdum vs. Browne	UFC 172: Jones vs. Teixeira	UFC Fight Night: Brown vs. Silva

UFC 172: Jones vs. Teixeira was a mixed martial arts event that was held by the Ultimate Fighting Championship on April 26, 2014, at the Baltimore Arena in Baltimore, Maryland.

The event was released on DVD on July 29, 2014. The DVD was distributed by the label Anchor Bay Entertainment.

== Background ==
A UFC Light Heavyweight Championship bout between the current champion Jon Jones and Glover Teixeira, briefly linked as the event headliner at UFC 169, UFC 170 and UFC 171 served as the main event.

Danny Castillo was originally expected to face Isaac Vallie-Flagg at this event. However, Castillo was replaced by Takanori Gomi and instead fought Charlie Brenneman.

Tarec Saffiedine was originally scheduled to face Jake Ellenberger in a welterweight bout, but withdrew due to a back injury. As a result, Ellenberger was removed from the card and was rescheduled to face Robbie Lawler at UFC 173.

Just one week before the event, Bobby Green suffered an injury and was forced off the card. Yancy Medeiros, who was supposed to fight Joe Ellenberger, stepped in and faced Green's original opponent Jim Miller. Ellenberger was expected to face returning veteran Vagner Rocha. Subsequently, just days after accepting the bout, Rocha injured himself in the week leading up to the event. With no time to find a suitable replacement, Ellenberger was pulled from the card as well.

== Results ==
Main card
Weight class				Method	Round	Time	Notes
Light Heavyweight	Jon Jones (c)	def.	Glover Teixeira	Decision (unanimous) (50–45, 50–45, 50–45)	5	5:00	(Note: For the UFC Light Heavyweight Championship)
Light Heavyweight	Anthony Johnson	def.	Phil Davis	Decision (unanimous) (30–27, 30–27, 30–27)	3	5:00
Middleweight	Luke Rockhold	def.	Tim Boetsch	Submission (kimura)	1	2:08
Lightweight	Jim Miller	def.	Yancy Medeiros	Technical Submission (guillotine choke)	1	3:18
Featherweight	Max Holloway	def.	Andre Fili	Submission (guillotine choke)	3	3:39
Preliminary card (Fox Sports 1)
Flyweight	Joseph Benavidez	def.	Tim Elliott	Submission (guillotine choke)	1	4:08
Lightweight	Takanori Gomi	def.	Isaac Vallie-Flagg	Decision (unanimous) (29–28, 29–28, 29–28)	3	5:00
Women's Bantamweight	Bethe Correia	def.	Jessamyn Duke	Decision (unanimous) (30–27, 29–28, 30–27)	3	5:00
Lightweight	Danny Castillo	def.	Charlie Brenneman	KO (punch)	2	0:21
Preliminary card (UFC Fight Pass)
Bantamweight	Chris Beal	def.	Patrick Williams	KO (flying knee)	2	1:51

== Bonus awards ==
The following fighters received $50,000 bonuses:

- Fight of the Night: Takanori Gomi vs. Isaac Vallie-Flagg
- Performance of the Night: Joseph Benavidez and Chris Beal

== See also ==
- List of UFC events
- 2014 in UFC
