= Luke Zachrich =

American mixed martial arts fighter

- Born: December 19, 1981 (age 44); Defiance, Ohio, United States
- Other names: The Blender
- Nationality: American
- Height: 6 ft 2 in (1.88 m)
- Weight: 185 lb (84 kg; 13.2 st)
- Division: Middleweight (185 lb) (2006–2014); Cruiserweight (boxing)
- Reach: 74.5 in (189 cm)
- Style: Kickboxing, Brazilian Jiu-jitsu
- Stance: Orthodox
- Fighting out of: Columbus, Ohio, United States (current); Cincinnati, Ohio, United States (former)
- Team: Ronin Training Center; Team Jorge Gurgel; The Beast Academy
- Trainer: Head Trainer: Rob Radford; Strength: Brandon Couden; Brazilian Jiu-jitsu: Vitor Oliveira; Wrestling: Nikolai Timbs
- Rank: Black belt in Brazilian jiu-jitsu under Vitor Oliveira
- Years active: 2006–2014 (MMA); 2014; 2016 (Boxing)

Professional boxing record
- Total: 3
- Wins: 3
- By knockout: 2
- Losses: 0

Mixed martial arts record
- Total: 18
- Wins: 14
- By knockout: 4
- By submission: 7
- By decision: 3
- Losses: 4
- By knockout: 1
- By submission: 3
- By decision: 0

Amateur record
- Total: 1
- Wins: 1
- By knockout: 1
- Losses: 0

Other information
- Occupation: Professional Mixed Martial Artist
- University: Bowling Green State University (B.ASc)
- Website: Official Site
- Boxing record from BoxRec
- Mixed martial arts record from Sherdog

Luke Zachrich (born December 19, 1981) is a retired American mixed martial artist and professional boxer who formerly competed in the Middleweight division of the Ultimate Fighting Championship A professional mixed martial arts competitor since 2006 until his release from the UFC in 2014, Zachrich was a member of Team Forrest on the seventh season of The Ultimate Fighter, and has also fought for King of the Cage, Bellator, Xtreme Fighting Organization, and Ultimate Victory Challenge, the latter of which he was the inaugural Middleweight Champion.

In the first few years of his career, he trained with professional wrestling and mixed martial arts legend Dan Severn at The Beast Academy in Coldwater, Michigan, before relocating to Team Jorge Gurgel in Cincinnati, Ohio. He now fights out his own training facility, the Ronin Training Center, where he is also one of the head instructors. During his professional career, he held a martial arts record of 14–4, with seven of his fourteen wins coming by way of submission. Zachrich is currently ineligible for the Tapology.com Middleweight rankings due to his retirement from mixed martial arts.

== Background ==
Zachrich was born on October 1, 1981, in Defiance, Ohio. During his first year, Zachrich was a varsity football player at Bowling Green University in Bowling Green, Ohio. After sustaining an injury in one of the last scheduled games of the season, he chose to discontinue his upstart career in football and find a different profession.

In the last couple of years in college, Zachrich was a part-time lacrosse player and then graduated with bachelor's degree in 2005. Around the same time, he stumbled upon mixed martial arts and began training with UFC legend and Hall of Famer Dan Severn at his gym, The Beast Academy, in Coldwater, Michigan and also trained with renowned Jujitsu practitioner Dave Morris. An upstart, Zachrich trained for two years under the tutelage of Severn and Jorge Gurgel's team, before accepting a last-minute offer to compete in an amateur bout in early 2006.

During an interview with MMA.TV, he was asked about how he made the transition to mixed martial arts.

Honestly, it was by chance. I had a short stint in college football and when that was over I really felt something missing in my life. Being a competitor was all I had ever known. So I started driving from Bowling Green to Toledo and started boxing. I continued that through the last couple years of college. Then, it just seemed like I kept meeting people and training with them that were involved in different aspects of MMA. Even though I had no intentions or aspirations of ever fighting. Then one day, I met an MMA guy when I moved back to Defiance, Ohio, [and] started training with him for fun and after a few months, someone needed a last minute fill in and I said yes. I won that fight pretty easily but I still didn't really see myself as a fighter. After that first fight, I just kept getting more offers and kept winning.

== Mixed martial arts career ==
In the first combat bout of his career, Zachrich faced off against fellow fighting newcomer Ben Kelley at Mega Fighting Championship's premiere event on January 14, 2006. It was a showcase of heavy stand-up striking for a majority of the bout, with Zachrich coming out on top with a first round technical knockout victory. Following more training, Zachrich would receive the opportunity to turn pro three months later. On April 15, 2006, he made a successful transition to professional mixed martial arts, as he submitted Cliff Perillo with strikes at the Ultimate Fight Series.

At 1–0, Zachrich continued his slow-and-steady climb up the divisional rankings, and would collect another victory on May 6, 2006, in the form of a thirty-one second TKO of Micah Bender in the preliminary portion of FightFest 3.

=== King of the Cage (2006–2007) ===
On September 29, 2006, Zachrich fought Jason Zazelenchuk at King of the Cage: Detonator, winning the fight by a quick rear-naked choke in the first round. After compiling a 1–1 record in regional promotions, getting the first loss of his career against Danny Ruiz by armbar, and rebounding by submitting Shane Krutchten with an armbar, he returned to the promotion and submitted Brad Burrick, also by an armbar, at King of the Cage: Explosion on June 15, 2007.

=== The Ultimate Fighter (2008) ===
After capturing Xtreme Fighting Organization's middleweight championship with a vicious first-round knockout of mixed martial arts journeyman William 'Bill' Hill, the UFC announced that Zachrich would be one of the sixteen Middleweight competitors set to take part in the seventh season of their hit reality show, The Ultimate Fighter, hosted by coaches Quinton Jackson and Forrest Griffin.

Zachrich took on Patrick Schultz in the preliminary round, taking Schultz out with a quick first round rear-naked choke. Impressing the two coaches, he was the final pick by Forrest Griffin of Team Griffin.

In the quarter-finals, Zachrich faced off against Team Rampage's Dan "Cosmo" Cramer. Despite having the considerable edge in overall experience, he was defeated with a second-round TKO and was eliminated from the show.

=== Post-TUF career (2008–2010) ===
Zachrich returned to the regional circuit soon after his Ultimate Fighter elimination, and his next fight was quickly put in place for the Full Contact Fight Series 28 event on September 6, 2008, where he took on regional journeyman Michael Musslewhite. In this contest, he continued to showcase his ever-improving boxing skills, taking Musslewhite out with a first-round knockout and moving himself to 8–1 in his growing career.

For his tenth career fight, he took on Robert Thompson at ICF: Breakout on April 11, 2009. Thompson, who came into the fight with a three-fight losing streak hanging over his head, would not fare well against Zachrich, and would be submitted with a keylock in the third round.

He faced J.R. Hines at ICF: Sacrifice on May 16, 2009. Zachrich took the fight to the ground early on and submitted Hines with a keylock in the first round, and with the victory, garnered the attention of Indiana based organization, MMA Big Show, who announced that they had signed him to a multi-fight deal on October 21, 2009. He was given Byron Sutton as his first opponent, and the two were expected to compete at the promotion's New Dawn event on January 9, 2010, however, the fight would be taken off the card by the promoter shortly after it was announced for undisclosed reasons. It wasn't until March 24, 2010, that it was announced that Zachrich had been signed by Bjorn Rebney's upstart mixed martial arts company, Bellator MMA.

=== Bellator MMA (2010) ===
Zachrich made his first and only appearance for the promotion at Bellator 16, and was matched-up against World Extreme Cagefighting veteran Eric Schambari in the middleweight tournament quarter-finals on April 29, 2010. He accepted the opportunity to fight Schambari having been battling nagging back injuries in the months heading into the fight, and after a back-and-forth first couple of minutes, with Zachrich nearly catching his opponent in a guillotine choke, he lost the fight by an arm-triangle choke in the first round. He was subsequently released from the promotion shortly after the bout.

=== Post-Bellator career (2010–2013) ===
Zachrich faced Nick Kraus for the inaugural Ultimate Victory Challenge middleweight title at UVC 20: Clash at the Coliseum on August 4, 2012, winning the bout by unanimous decision. He made his next appearance for UVC against Marcus Finch at UVC 23 on May 10, 2013. Zachrich won the fight via unanimous decision.

He faced off against Justin Gamble at AAMMA 34: Proving Ground 2 on August 10, 2013, winning the fight by a straight armbar forty-five seconds into the first round. The quick and impressive finish would also earn Zachrich Submission of the Year honors from Bluegrass MMA, and at the end of the 2013, was the close runner-up in the 2013 Pro Male Breakout Fighter awards by BlueGrass MMA, with future UFC bantamweight Cody Garbrandt narrowly snagging the lead slot in that category. Zachrich was tabbed to face UFC veteran Luigi Fioravanti at UVC 27 on February 8, 2014, but the fight would be postponed a month to March 15, 2014. However, a couple of weeks after the fight was rescheduled, the entire event would be canceled by the promoter for undisclosed reasons.

=== Ultimate Fighting Championship (2014–2015) ===
When Josh Samman had to pull out of his scheduled bout against Caio Magalhães due to an injury, Zachrich was signed to a multi-fight contract and stepped up as a short-notice replacement for Samman at UFC on Fox 11 on April 19, 2014. He lost the bout by TKO in just forty-four seconds, after being dropped by heavy body shots from Magalhães.

In his second fight with the promotion, Zachrich faced promotional newcomer Guilherme Vasconcelos at UFC 175 on July 5, 2014. Zachrich would earn his first UFC victory with a dominant unanimous decision verdict over Vasconcelos, effectively outworking his Brazilian counterpart on the feet and showing improved takedown defense. He then faced touted promotional newcomer and expert Judoka practitioner Dan Kelly at UFC Fight Night: Rockhold vs. Bisping on November 7, 2014. Zachrich would be a significant betting favorite coming into the bout, however, he was outboxed on the feet and towards the end of the first round, was taken down by Kelly and subsequently submitted with a kimura.

Zachrich announced on Twitter on August 1, 2015, that he had successfully recovered from a lingering back injury and was in the process of returning to active MMA competition. However, on October 19, 2015, it was confirmed that Zachrich was released from the promotion and has since retired from mixed martial arts.

== Boxing career ==
Boxing is something that I always wanted to do. It is getting harder and harder for me to get MMA fights to stick. So this is a way for me to stay active. I had a lot of fun out there tonight. I am in no way done with MMA, but boxing is definitely something I look forward to doing again.

— Zachrich, in his interview with Robert "Turtle" Whitson of Cage Passion Media.

A few weeks before making his debut with the Ultimate Fighting Championship, Zachrich competed in a cruiserweight boxing bout against Strikeforce veteran and combat journeyman John "J.P." Felty at TBC: Championship Boxing, getting a technical knockout victory over Felty in the second round with two seconds left.

In a post-fight interview with Cage Passion Media, Zachrich said that he simply took the fight to keep himself busy and was already planning on returning to mixed martial arts, but didn't rule out the possibility of taking another boxing bout in the future.

Following his release from the UFC in 2015, Zachrich made his return to boxing on January 15, 2016, scoring a TKO over the debuting Gary Vandyne at the Hollywood Casino in Columbus, Ohio. Less than two months later, Zachrich booked another boxing match and won a unanimous decision against Bill Yates on March 4, 2016. Zachrich has not competed in any amateur or professional boxing bouts since his decision victory over Yates.

== Personal life ==
Zachrich holds an undergraduate degree in applied sciences from Bowling Green State University. He is currently married and has children. On top of competing in mixed martial arts, Zachrich revealed in an interview with MMA Junkie that he also remotely manages three Mellow Mushroom restaurants, and plans on opening and managing more in the future. In 2017, Zachrich started a new position as a sales representative for the Columbus, Ohio branch of Stryker Corporation, a Fortune 500 medical technologies firm originally based in Kalamazoo, Michigan.

== Championships and accomplishments ==
=== Mixed martial arts ===
- Bluegrass MMA
  - 2013 BGMMA Award for Submission of the Year (Straight armbar vs. Justin Gamble)
  - 2013 BGMMA Pro Male Breakout Fighter (Runner-up)
- Ultimate Victory Challenge
  - UVC Middleweight Championship (One time; First)
- Xtreme Fighting Organization
  - XFO Middleweight Championship (One time)

=== Grappling credentials ===
- Grapplers Quest
  - Grapplers Quest Midwest Open Champion
  - Grapplers Quest Midwest Open Absolute Silver Medal
- International Brazilian Jiu-Jitsu Federation
  - IBJJF Pan American Bronze Medal
  - IBJJF American Nationals Silver Medal
  - IBJJF American Nationals No-Gi Absolute Champion

== Professional boxing record ==
3 Wins (2 knockouts, 1 decision), 0 Losses, 0 Draws, 0 No Contests
Res.	Record	Opponent	Type	Rd., Time	Event	Date	Location	Notes
Win	3–0	(United States) Bill Yates	UD	4	Arnold Classic at the Lifestyle Pavilion	March 4, 2016	Lifestyle Pavilion, Columbus Ohio, United States	
Win	2–0	(United States) Gary Vandyne	TKO	1 (4)	Hollywood Casino Columbus	January 15, 2016	Hollywood Casino, Columbus, Ohio, United States	
Win	1–0	(United States) John Felty	TKO	2 (4)	TBC: Championship Boxing	March 1, 2014	Lifestyle Pavilion, Columbus, Ohio, United States	Professional boxing debut.

== Mixed martial arts record ==
Professional record breakdown
18 matches	14 wins	4 losses
By knockout	4	1
By submission	7	3
By decision	3	0

Res.	Record	Opponent	Method	Event	Date	Round	Time	Location	Notes
Loss	14–4	Dan Kelly	Submission (kimura)	UFC Fight Night: Rockhold vs. Bisping	November 7, 2014	1	4:27	Sydney, Australia	
Win	14–3	Guilherme Vasconcelos	Decision (unanimous)	UFC 175: Weidman vs. Machida	July 5, 2014	3	5:00	Las Vegas, Nevada, United States	
Loss	13–3	Caio Magalhães	TKO (punches)	UFC on Fox: Werdum vs. Browne	April 19, 2014	1	0:44	Orlando, Florida, United States	
Win	13–2	Justin Gamble	Submission (straight armbar)	AAMMA 34: Proving Ground 2	August 10, 2013	1	0:45	Williamstown, Kentucky, United States	Won 2013 Submission of the Year (Bluegrass MMA).
Win	12–2	Marcus Finch	Decision (unanimous)	UVC 23: Invasion	May 10, 2013	3	5:00	Columbus, Ohio, United States	Non-title bout.
Win	11–2	Nick Kraus	Decision (unanimous)	UVC 20: Clash at the Coliseum	August 4, 2012	3	5:00	Columbus, Ohio, United States	Won the UVC Middleweight Championship.
Loss	10–2	Eric Schambari	Submission (arm-triangle choke)	Bellator 16	April 29, 2010	1	3:34	Kansas City, Missouri, United States	Middleweight Tournament Quarterfinals.
Win	10–1	J.R. Hines	Submission (keylock)	Intimidation Cage Fighting: Sacrifice	May 16, 2009	1	2:22	Florence, Kentucky, United States	
Win	9–1	Robert Thompson	Submission (keylock)	Intimidation Cage Fighting: Breakout	April 11, 2009	3	3:07	Cincinnati, Ohio, United States	
Win	8–1	Michael Musslewhite	KO (punches)	FCFS 28: Clash of the Titans	September 6, 2008	1	1:15	Fort Wayne, Indiana, United States	
Win	7–1	William Hill	KO (punch)	XFO: Xtreme Fighting Organization 21	December 1, 2007	1	4:56	Lakemoor, Illinois, United States	Won the XFO Middleweight Championship.
Win	6–1	Darnell Strong	KO (punch)	XFO: Xtreme Fighting Organization 20	October 19, 2007	1	0:35	Lakemoor, Illinois, United States	
Win	5–1	Brad Burrick	Submission (armbar)	KOTC: Explosion	June 15, 2007	1	1:51	Mt. Pleasant, Michigan, United States	
Win	4–1	Shane Kruchten	Submission (armbar)	Dangerzone 34: Fight Farm	June 2, 2007	1	N/A	Waterloo, Iowa, United States	
Loss	3–1	Danny Ruiz	Submission (armbar)	RFS 8: Invasion of the Cage	February 24, 2007	1	1:49	Tampa, Florida, United States	
Win	3–0	Jason Zazelenchuk	Submission (rear-naked choke)	KOTC: Detonator	September 29, 2006	1	2:48	Calgary, Alberta, Canada	
Win	2–0	Micah Bender	TKO (punches)	FF 3: Fightfest 3	May 6, 2006	1	0:31	Youngstown, Ohio, United States	
Win	1–0	Cliff Perillo	Submission (punches)	UFS: Ultimate Fight Series	April 15, 2006	1	1:31	Auburn, Indiana, United States	

=== Mixed martial arts exhibition record ===
Exhibition record breakdown		
2 matches	1 win	1 loss
By knockout	0	1
By submission	1	0
By decision	0	0

Result	Record	Opponent	Method	Event	Date	Round	Time	Location	Notes
Loss	1–1	Dan Cramer	TKO (punches)	The Ultimate Fighter: Team Rampage vs. Team Forrest (Episode 6)	May 7, 2008 (air date)	2	1:49	Las Vegas, Nevada, United States	The Ultimate Fighter: Team Rampage vs. Team Forrest first round.
Win	1–0	Patrick Schultz	Submission (rear-naked choke)	The Ultimate Fighter: Team Rampage vs. Team Forrest (Episode 2)	April 9, 2008 (air date)	1	2:29	Las Vegas, Nevada, United States	The Ultimate Fighter: Team Rampage vs. Team Forrest eliminations.

=== Amateur mixed martial arts record ===
Amateur record breakdown		
1 match	1 win	0 losses
By knockout	1	0
By submission	0	0
By decision	0	0
No contests	0	

Result	Record	Opponent	Method	Event	Date	Round	Time	Location	Notes
Win	1–0	Ben Kelley	TKO (punches)	Mega Fighting Championship 1	January 14, 2006	1	N/A	Marion, Ohio, United States	

== See also ==
- List of male mixed martial artists
- List of current UFC fighters
- List of Brazilian jiu-jitsu practitioners
- List of mixed martial artists with professional boxing records
