= Tateki Matsuda =

Japanese mixed martial arts fighter

Tateki Matsuda 松田干城
- Born: Tateki Matsuda; February 7, 1986 (age 40); Tokyo, Japan
- Other names: Tech
- Nationality: Japanese
- Height: 5 ft 7 in (1.70 m)
- Weight: 135 lb (61 kg; 9.6 st)
- Division: Flyweight; Bantamweight; Featherweight
- Reach: 65.5 in (166 cm)
- Fighting out of: Somerville, Massachusetts, United States
- Team: Team Sityodtong
- Rank: Brown belt in Brazilian Jiu-Jitsu
- Years active: 2008–present

Mixed martial arts record
- Total: 26
- Wins: 15
- By knockout: 5
- By submission: 1
- By decision: 9
- Losses: 11
- By knockout: 1
- By decision: 9
- By disqualification: 1

Other information
- Mixed martial arts record from Sherdog

Tateki Matsuda Japanese: 松田干城 (born February 7, 1986) is a Japanese professional mixed martial artist, who most recently competed in the Flyweight division of the Ultimate Fighting Championship. A professional competitor since 2008, Matsuda has also formerly competed for Bellator MMA and Pancrase.

== Personal life ==
Born in and raised in Japan, Matsuda moved to Massachusetts in the United States to further his education. He first earned a bachelor's degree in Sports Movement Science for Coaching from Salem State University, and then graduated with a master's degree in Applied Nutrition for Fitness from Northeastern University in 2013.

== Mixed martial arts career ==
=== Early career ===
Matsuda held an amateur record of 0-1 before making his professional MMA debut in 2008. Matsuda compiled an overall record of 10-5 competing primarily in regional promotions across New England, including a one fight stint in Bellator MMA before being signing with the UFC in the summer of 2014.

=== Ultimate Fighting Championship ===
Matsuda made his promotional debut as a short notice replacement against Chris Beal on September 5, 2014 at UFC Fight Night 50, where he replaced an injured Dustin Kimura. Matsuda lost the fight via unanimous decision.

Matsuda made his next appearance against Joby Sanchez in a flyweight bout on January 18, 2015 at UFC Fight Night 59. Sanchez defeated Matsuda in a back and forth fight via split decision. Subsequently, Matsuda was released from the organization.

=== Post UFC ===
After going 5–3 on the American and Japanese regional scene, Matsuda faced Louie Sanoudakis on April 2, 2022 at XMMA 4. He lost the bout via unanimous decision.

== Mixed martial arts record ==
Professional record breakdown
26 matches	15 wins	11 losses
By knockout	5	1
By submission	1	0
By decision	9	9
By disqualification	0	1

Res.	Record	Opponent	Method	Event	Date	Round	Time	Location	Notes
Loss	15–11	Louie Sanoudakis	Decision (unanimous)	XMMA 4: Black Magic	April 2, 2022	3	5:00	New Orleans, Louisiana, United States	
Loss	15–10	Kin Moy	Decision (unanimous)	Cage Titans 47	January 25, 2020	3	5:00	Plymouth, Massachusetts, United States	
Win	15–9	Matt Almy	Decision (unanimous)	CES MMA 57	July 26, 2019	3	5:00	Lincoln, Rhode Island, United States	
Win	14–9	Joshua Ricci	Decision (unanimous)	CES MMA 54	January 19, 2019	3	5:00	Lincoln, Rhode Island, United States	
Loss	13–9	Toru Ogawa	TKO (punches)	Pancrase 297	July 1, 2018	1	2:50	Tokyo, Japan	
Loss	13–8	Senzo Ikeda	Decision (unanimous)	Pancrase 285	March 12, 2017	3	5:00	Tokyo, Japan	
Win	13–7	Tatsuya So	Decision (unanimous)	Pancrase 280	September 11, 2016	3	5:00	Tokyo, Japan	
Win	12–7	Joe Pearson	Submission (punches)	Legacy FC 51: Ramos vs. Vazquez	February 5, 2016	1	4:49	Hinckley, Minnesota, United States	
Win	11–7	Johnny Campbell	Decision (unanimous)	Cage Titans FC 26	November 7, 2015	3	5:00	Plymouth, Massachusetts, United States	
Loss	10–7	Joby Sanchez	Decision (split)	UFC Fight Night: McGregor vs. Siver	January 18, 2015	3	5:00	Boston, Massachusetts, United States	Flyweight debut.
Loss	10–6	Chris Beal	Decision (unanimous)	UFC Fight Night: Jacare vs. Mousasi	September 5, 2014	3	5:00	Mashantucket, Connecticut, United States	
Win	10–5	Robbie Leroux	Submission (rear-naked choke)	CES MMA 25	August 8, 2014	1	4:53	Lincoln, Rhode Island, United States	Catchweight (139 lbs) bout.
Win	9–5	Matt Doherty	Decision (unanimous)	CES MMA 23	April 25, 2014	3	5:00	Lincoln, Rhode Island, United States	
Loss	8–5	Paul Gorman	Decision (split)	NEF: Fight Night 11	November 9, 2013	5	5:00	Lewiston, Maine, United States	
Loss	8–4	Matthew Tran	Decision (unanimous)	VCS: Victory Combat Sports	September 28, 2013	3	5:00	Dorchester, Massachusetts, United States	
Win	8–3	Myung Hwan Lee	TKO (punches)	Gladiator 49	December 16, 2012	1	4:33	Tokyo, Japan	
Win	7–3	Johnny Campbell	Decision (unanimous)	Cage Titans 8: Conquer	May 5, 2012	5	5:00	Plymouth, Massachusetts, United States	Return to Bantamweight.
Loss	6–3	Saul Almeida	Decision (unanimous)	Bellator 48	August 20, 2011	3	5:00	Uncasville, Connecticut, United States	Featherweight bout.
Win	6–2	Barrington Douse	Decision (unanimous)	Cage Titans 4: Vengeance	April 1, 2011	5	5:00	Boston, Massachusetts, United States	
Win	5–2	Jason Bennett	Decision (unanimous)	CES MMA: Snow Brawl	December 2, 2010	3	5:00	Lincoln, Rhode Island, United States	
Loss	4–2	Anthony Leone	Decision (split)	Xtreme Championship Fight League 2	March 26, 2010	5	5:00	Lowell, Massachusetts, United States	
Win	4–1	Billy Walsh	TKO (punches)	Xtreme Championship Fight League 1	March 26, 2010	1	2:21	Marlborough, Massachusetts, United States	
Win	3–1	Aguilano Brando	KO (punch)	GFL: Global Fight League 4	September 19, 2009	1	3:59	Concord, New Hampshire, United States	
Loss	2–1	Bill Jones	DQ (illegal elbow)	GFL: Global Fight League 3	June 12, 2009	2	0:58	Concord, New Hampshire, United States	
Win	2–0	Alvaro Bobadilha	Decision (unanimous)	WOCS: Watch Out Combat Show 3	March 19, 2009	3	5:00	Rio de Janeiro, Brazil	
Win	1–0	Wayne Clark	KO (punches)	Reality Fighting: Collision	June 19, 2008	1	0:55	Plymouth, Massachusetts, United States	
