= Patrick Williams (fighter) =

American mixed martial arts fighter

- Born: September 7, 1981 (age 45); Miami, Florida, United States
- Other names: The Animal
- Nationality: American
- Height: 5 ft 8 in (1.73 m)
- Weight: 135 lb (61 kg; 9.6 st)
- Division: Featherweight; Bantamweight
- Reach: 72 in (183 cm)
- Fighting out of: Homestead, Florida, United States
- Team: Freestyle Fighting Academy
- Years active: 2010–present

Mixed martial arts record
- Total: 14
- Wins: 8
- By knockout: 4
- By submission: 3
- By decision: 1
- Losses: 6
- By knockout: 3
- By submission: 1
- By decision: 2

Other information
- Mixed martial arts record from Sherdog

Patrick Clive Williams (born September 7, 1981) is an American mixed martial artist who formerly competed in the Bantamweight division of the Ultimate Fighting Championship. A professional competitor since 2010, he has also formerly competed for the Xtreme Fighting Championships in his native Florida.

== Background ==
Born and raised in Miami alongside 11 other siblings, Williams began wrestling in middle school and was talented, going undefeated in his first two full seasons. At South Dade Senior High School, he was a two-time state champion and a runner-up. Williams also competed in track and field, lettering in three seasons. After attending Neosho County Community College in Chanute, Kansas for two years with one year yielding a third-place finish nationally, he later transferred to Arizona State University, competing for the Sun Devils. After a lackluster junior year where he finished with a 9–13 record, Williams came back his senior year and found more success; finishing at 29–14, and went undefeated 7–0 in conference dual matches. Williams graduated ASU with a degree in interdisciplinary studies, and worked as a case manager for a Dual Diagnostic Juvenile Detention Center.

== Mixed martial arts career ==
=== Early career ===
After going 7-3 competing as a Featherweight in regional promotions, Williams signed on to compete in the UFC as a Bantamweight.

=== Ultimate Fighting Championship ===
At UFC 172, Williams lost to Chris Beal where Beal won the Performance of the Night award.

At UFC 188, Williams defeated Alejandro Pérez in 23 seconds.

After a more than 18-month layoff, Williams lost to Tom Duquesnoy at UFC on Fox 24.

Williams faced Luke Sanders on April 14, 2018, at UFC on Fox 29. He lost the fight via unanimous decision.

== Mixed martial arts record ==
Professional record breakdown
14 matches	8 wins	6 losses
By knockout	4	3
By submission	3	1
By decision	1	2

Res.	Record	Opponent	Method	Event	Date	Round	Time	Location	Notes
Loss	8–6	Luke Sanders	Decision (unanimous)	UFC on Fox: Poirier vs. Gaethje	April 14, 2018	3	5:00	Glendale, Arizona, United States	
Loss	8–5	Tom Duquesnoy	TKO (elbows)	UFC on Fox: Johnson vs. Reis	April 15, 2017	2	1:05	Kansas City, Missouri, United States	
Win	7–5	Alejandro Pérez	Technical Submission (guillotine)	UFC 188	June 13, 2015	1	0:23	Mexico City, Mexico	Performance of the Night.
Loss	6–5	Chris Beal	KO (flying knee)	UFC 172	April 16, 2014	2	1:51	Baltimore, Maryland, United States	Bantamweight debut.
Win	6–4	Rafael Dias	TKO (punches)	Fight Time 17	November 1, 2013	1	2:17	Fort Lauderdale, Florida, United States	
Win	6–3	Gabe Maldonado	TKO (punches)	XFC 24	June 14, 2013	1	0:50	Tampa, Florida, United States	Catchweight (150 lbs) bout.
Loss	5–3	Pablo Alfonso	KO (punch)	CFA 8	Oct 6, 2012	1	1:22	Coral Gables, Florida, United States	
Win	5–2	Luis Nazario	Submission (rear-naked choke)	Fight Time 9	April 27, 2012	1	4:35	Fort Lauderdale, Florida, United States	
Win	4–2	Sebastian Angel	TKO (broken jaw)	CFA 6	April 13, 2012	1	5:00	Coral Gables, Florida, United States	Catchweight (150 lbs) bout.
Loss	3–2	Ralph Acosta	Submission (rear naked choke)	UAF 1	November 10, 2011	2	1:05	Miami, Florida, United States	
Win	3–1	Phil Gebauer	Submission (rear naked choke)	Fight Time 7	Oct 7, 2011	2	4:17	Fort Lauderdale, Florida, United States	
Win	2–1	John McDowell	Decision (unanimous)	MFA: Generation 5	May 7, 2011	3	5:00	Miami, Florida, United States	
Loss	1–1	Justin Linn	Decision (split)	MFA: New Generation 4	Feb 12, 2011	3	5:00	Miami, Florida, United States	
Win	1–0	Shaughn Koukos	TKO (punches)	FTP: Fight Time 1	Aug 21, 2010	1	1:47	Pompano Beach, Florida, United States	

== See also ==
- List of current UFC fighters
- List of male mixed martial artists
