= Christos Giagos =

American mixed martial artist (born 1990)

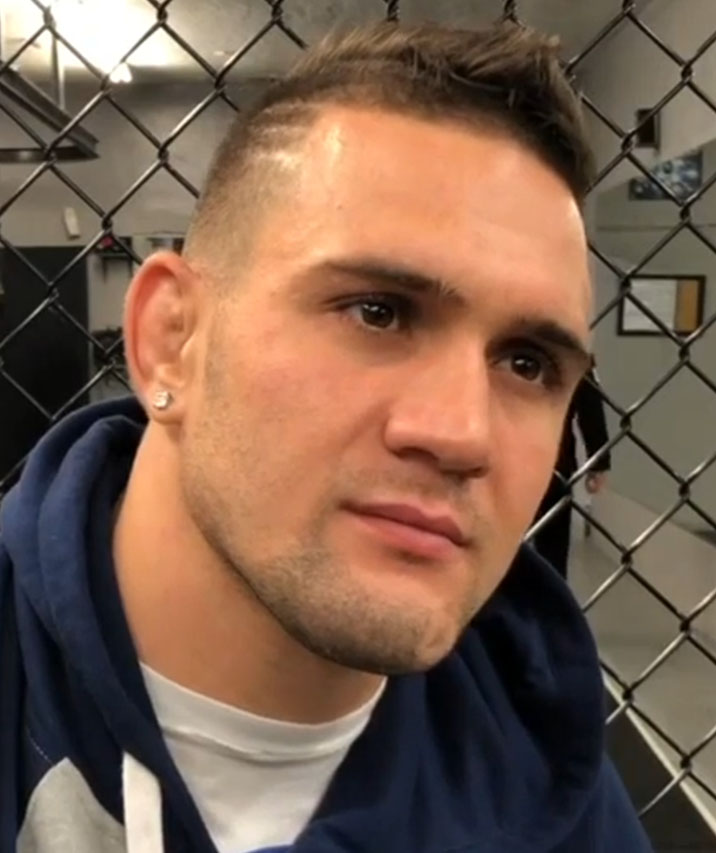
- Giagos in 2019
- Born: January 23, 1990 (age 36); Azusa, California, U.S.
- Other names: The Spartan
- Height: 5 ft 10 in (1.78 m)
- Weight: 155 lb (70 kg; 11 st 1 lb)
- Division: Lightweight
- Reach: 71 in (180 cm)
- Fighting out of: Florida, U.S.
- Team: Systems Training Center; Team Victory; Black House (formerly); California MMA (2021); Sanford MMA (2021–present)
- Rank: Brown belt in Brazilian Jiu-Jitsu under Giva Santana
- Years active: 2010–present

Mixed martial arts record
- Total: 32
- Wins: 20
- By knockout: 8
- By submission: 4
- By decision: 8
- Losses: 12
- By knockout: 3
- By submission: 6
- By decision: 3

Other information
- Mixed martial arts record from Sherdog

Christos Giagos (born January 23, 1990) is an American professional mixed martial artist who competed in the lightweight division in the Ultimate Fighting Championship (UFC).

== Background ==
Giagos was born and raised in Southern California. Giagos competed in wrestling in high school, and began training in mixed martial arts at age 19 in 2009. He is a Greek American.

== Mixed martial arts career ==
=== Early career ===
Giagos made his professional mixed martial arts debut in 2009 competing as a lightweight primarily in regional promotions across California. He was able to compile a record of 10–2, including winning the RFA Lightweight Championship on August 22, 2014 with a TKO stoppage of Dakota Cochrane. On the heels of that victory, Giagos signed with the UFC in the fall of 2014.

=== Ultimate Fighting Championship ===
Giagos made his promotional debut against Gilbert Burns on October 25, 2014 at UFC 179. He lost the bout via submission in the first round.

Giagos faced Jorge de Oliveira on March 21, 2015 at UFC Fight Night 62. Giagos won the fight via submission in the first round.

Giagos faced Chris Wade on June 6, 2015 at UFC Fight Night 68. He lost the fight by unanimous decision and was subsequently released from the promotion.

=== Absolute Championship Berkut ===
He made his debut in Russia promotion against Alexandre Pimentel of Brazil at ACB 51: Silva vs. Torgeson on January 13, 2017. He won the fight unanimous decision.

In the second match he will make fight against Shamil Nikaev at ACB 71: Yan vs. Mattos on September 30, 2017. He lost the back-and-forth fight by split decision.

=== Return to UFC ===
On the heels of a 4–2 run on the regional circuit, Giagos made his return to the promotion against Charles Oliveira on September 22, 2018 at UFC Fight Night 137. He lost the fight via a submission in the second round. “I felt like when I came in the Oliveira fight, I was actually performing very well. I was actually really excited with my performance. I wish I opened up a little more. But, I was a little nervous of the takedown. This guy’s jiu jitsu is just next level, he holds the most submissions. I felt like I was doing really well. Everyone had me winning the first round." Giagos said of his performance after the fight.

Giagos faced Mizuto Hirota on December 2, 2018 at UFC Fight Night 142. He won the fight via unanimous decision.

Giagos faced Damir Hadžović on June 1, 2019 at UFC Fight Night 153. He won the fight via unanimous decision.

Giagos faced Drakkar Klose on August 17, 2019 at UFC 241. He lost the back-and-forth fight via unanimous decision.

Giagos was expected to face Alan Patrick on April 25, 2020. However, he was pulled from the fight citing injury and he was replaced by Frank Camacho.

Giagos replaced Rick Glenn and faced Carlton Minus at UFC Fight Night: Thompson vs. Neal on December 19, 2020. Giagos won the fight via unanimous decision.

Giagos was scheduled to face Joel Álvarez on May 15, 2021 at UFC 262. However, Álvarez was removed from the bout in early May due to alleged visa issues that restricted his travel. Giagos faced returning veteran Sean Soriano. He won the bout via D'arce choke in the second round. This win earned Giagos the Performance of the Night bonus award.

Giagos faced Arman Tsarukyan on September 18, 2021 at UFC Fight Night 192. He lost the fight via technical knockout in round one.

Giagos faced Thiago Moisés at UFC on ESPN 38 on June 25, 2022. He lost the fight via a rear-naked choke submission in the first round.

Giagos was scheduled to face Benoît Saint-Denis on September 3, 2022 at UFC Fight Night 209. However, Giagos pulled out in early August after severing a tendon of his little finger during a domestic accident.

Giagos faced Ricky Glenn on April 22, 2023, at UFC Fight Night 222. He won the fight by technical knockout in the first round. This performance earned Giagos his second Performance Of The Night award.

Giagos faced Daniel Zellhuber on September 16, 2023, at UFC Fight Night 227. He lost the fight via an anaconda choke submission in round two.

Giagos faced Ignacio Bahamondes on April 6, 2024, at UFC Fight Night 240. He lost in the first round as a result of a head kick knockout.

On October 10, 2024, it was reported that Giagos was removed from the UFC roster.

== Personal life ==
Besides training at Systems Training Center, Giagos coaches CrossFit, kickboxing and strength and conditioning there. He is also an avid tenpin bowler.

== Championships and achievements ==
=== Mixed martial arts ===
- Ultimate Fighting Championship
  - Performance of the Night (Two times) vs. Sean Soriano and Ricky Glenn.
- Tachi Palace Fights
  - Tachi Palace Fights Lightweight Championship (one time; former)
- Resurrection Fighting Alliance
  - Resurrection Fighting Alliance Lightweight Championship (one time; former)

== Mixed martial arts record ==
Professional record breakdown
32 matches	20 wins	12 losses
By knockout	8	3
By submission	4	6
By decision	8	3

Res.	Record	Opponent	Method	Event	Date	Round	Time	Location	Notes
Loss	20–12	Ignacio Bahamondes	KO (head kick)	UFC Fight Night: Allen vs. Curtis 2	April 6, 2024	1	3:34	Las Vegas, Nevada, United States	
Loss	20–11	Daniel Zellhuber	Submission (anaconda choke)	UFC Fight Night: Grasso vs. Shevchenko 2	September 16, 2023	2	3:26	Las Vegas, Nevada, United States	
Win	20–10	Ricky Glenn	KO (punch)	UFC Fight Night: Pavlovich vs. Blaydes	April 22, 2023	1	1:35	Las Vegas, Nevada, United States	Performance of the Night.
Loss	19–10	Thiago Moisés	Submission (rear-naked choke)	UFC on ESPN: Tsarukyan vs. Gamrot	June 25, 2022	1	3:05	Las Vegas, Nevada, United States	
Loss	19–9	Arman Tsarukyan	TKO (punches)	UFC Fight Night: Smith vs. Spann	September 18, 2021	1	2:09	Las Vegas, Nevada, United States	
Win	19–8	Sean Soriano	Technical Submission (brabo choke)	UFC 262	May 15, 2021	2	0:59	Houston, Texas, United States	Performance of the Night.
Win	18–8	Carlton Minus	Decision (unanimous)	UFC Fight Night: Thompson vs. Neal	December 19, 2020	3	5:00	Las Vegas, Nevada, United States	Catchweight (160 lb) bout.
Loss	17–8	Drakkar Klose	Decision (unanimous)	UFC 241	August 17, 2019	3	5:00	Anaheim, California, United States	
Win	17–7	Damir Hadžović	Decision (unanimous)	UFC Fight Night: Gustafsson vs. Smith	June 1, 2019	3	5:00	Stockholm, Sweden	
Win	16–7	Mizuto Hirota	Decision (unanimous)	UFC Fight Night: dos Santos vs. Tuivasa	December 2, 2018	3	5:00	Adelaide, Australia	
Loss	15–7	Charles Oliveira	Submission (rear-naked choke)	UFC Fight Night: Santos vs. Anders	September 22, 2018	2	3:22	São Paulo, Brazil	
Win	15–6	Herdeson Batista	Decision (unanimous)	ACB 82	March 9, 2018	3	5:00	São Paulo, Brazil	
Loss	14–6	Shamil Nikaev	Decision (split)	ACB 71	September 30, 2017	3	5:00	Moscow, Russia	
Win	14–5	Alexandre Pimentel	Decision (unanimous)	ACB 51	January 13, 2017	3	5:00	Irvine, California, United States	
Win	13–5	Arthur Estrázulas	Decision (unanimous)	RFA 42: Giagos vs. Estrázulas	August 19, 2016	3	5:00	Visalia, California, United States	
Win	12–5	Karen Darabedyan	TKO (punches)	RFA 38: Moisés vs. Emmers	June 3, 2016	1	1:42	Costa Mesa, California, United States	
Loss	11–5	Josh Emmett	TKO (punches)	West Coast FC 16	January 23, 2016	3	2:21	Sacramento, California, United States	For the West Coast FC Lightweight Championship.
Loss	11–4	Chris Wade	Decision (unanimous)	UFC Fight Night: Boetsch vs. Henderson	June 6, 2015	3	5:00	New Orleans, Louisiana, United States	
Win	11–3	Jorge de Oliveira	Submission (rear-naked choke)	UFC Fight Night: Maia vs. LaFlare	March 21, 2015	1	3:12	Rio de Janeiro, Brazil	
Loss	10–3	Gilbert Burns	Submission (armbar)	UFC 179	October 25, 2014	1	4:57	Rio de Janeiro, Brazil	
Win	10–2	Dakota Cochrane	TKO (flying knee and punches)	RFA 17	August 22, 2014	2	2:04	Sioux Falls, South Dakota, United States	Won the RFA Lightweight Championship.
Win	9–2	Sevak Magakian	Submission (triangle choke)	TPF 19: Thowback Thursday	June 19, 2014	1	4:45	Lemoore, California, United States	Won the vacant TPF Lightweight Championship.
Win	8–2	Preston Scharf	TKO (doctor stoppage)	LOP: Chaos at the Casino 4	April 12, 2014	2	5:00	Inglewood, California, United States	
Win	7–2	Thor Skancke	TKO (punches)	LOP: Chaos at the Casino 3	November 23, 2013	1	1:27	Inglewood, California, United States	
Loss	6–2	Poppies Martinez	Submission (guillotine choke)	TPF 16: The Return	August 22, 2013	1	4:27	Lemoore, California, United States	
Win	6–1	Chris Tickle	Submission (rear-naked choke)	Flawless FC 3	May 18, 2013	2	2:32	Inglewood, California, United States	
Win	5–1	Joe Lewis	TKO (punches)	Samurai MMA Pro 4	October 19, 2012	2	1:12	Culver City, California, United States	
Loss	4–1	Jason Gonzales	Submission (D'Arce choke)	RITC	May 19, 2012	2	4:14	Pomona, California, United States	
Win	4–0	Joe Camacho	Decision (unanimous)	RITC	November 19, 2011	3	5:00	Pomona, California, United States	
Win	3–0	Chris Manzo	KO (punch)	RITC	March 12, 2011	2	4:07	Pomona, California, United States	
Win	2–0	Jose Alderete	TKO (punches)	Fury Fights 7	August 21, 2010	3	1:14	Pomona, California, United States	
Win	1–0	Dominic Gutierrez	TKO (punches)	John Pena Promotions	June 11, 2010	3	5:00	Pomona, California, United States	

== See also ==
- List of male mixed martial artists
