= Sean Soriano =

American mixed martial artist (born 1989)

- Born: October 6, 1989 (age 37); Providence, Rhode Island, United States
- Nationality: American
- Height: 5 ft 9 in (1.75 m)
- Weight: 145 lb (66 kg; 10 st 5 lb)
- Division: Featherweight
- Reach: 71 in (180 cm)
- Fighting out of: Boca Raton, Florida, United States
- Team: American Top Team (2009–2011); Blackzilians (2011–2017); Sanford MMA (2017–present)
- Years active: 2009–present

Mixed martial arts record
- Total: 24
- Wins: 15
- By knockout: 8
- By submission: 4
- By decision: 3
- Losses: 9
- By knockout: 1
- By submission: 5
- By decision: 3

Other information
- Mixed martial arts record from Sherdog

Sean Soriano (born October 6, 1989) is an American mixed martial artist who competed in the featherweight division of the UFC.

== Background ==
Born and raised in Providence, Rhode Island, Soriano wrestled in Mount Pleasant High School Soriano and became the state championship in 145lbs in his senior year. He also played soccer and baseball successfully in the high school. Soriano begun training in mixed martial arts after graduating from the high school in 2007.

== Mixed martial arts career ==
He made his professional debut in 2009 competing primarily in regional promotions across New England before moving to South Florida in 2011 where he began training at Blackzilians. He compiled a record of 8–0, before signing with the UFC near the end of 2013.

=== Ultimate Fighting Championship ===
Soriano made his promotional debut as a short notice replacement against Tatsuya Kawajiri on January 4, 2014 at UFC Fight Night 35, replacing an injured Hacran Dias. Kawajiri won the back and forth fight via submission in the second round.

Soriano was expected to face Estevan Payan on April 19, 2014 at UFC on Fox 11. However, Soriano was forced to pull out due to injury and was replaced by Mike Brown. In turn, Brown was forced out of the bout and was replaced by promotional newcomer Alex White.

Soriano was expected to face Andre Fili on September 5, 2014 at UFC Fight Night 50. However, Fili was forced from the bout with an injury and replaced by Chas Skelly. Skelly won the fight via unanimous decision.

Soriano faced Charles Rosa on January 18, 2015 at UFC Fight Night 59. Rosa won the bout via submission in the third round. Subsequently, Soriano was released from the promotion.

=== Post-UFC career ===
After his release from the UFC, Soriano fought Josh Quayhagen at Legacy FC 48 in late 2015, winning the fight via knockout.

In March 2016, Soriano fought Thomas Webb at Legacy FC 52. Soriano lost the fight via technical knockout.

Soriano fought fellow UFC veteran Levan Makashvili at CES MMA 38 on September 23, 2016 and lost the bout by way of rear-naked choke.

On May 12, 2017, Soriano fought Jacob Bohn at CES MMA 44, winning the fight via leg kicks.

After almost a year from his previous fight, Soriano fought Jonathan Gary at CES MMA 49 on April 6, 2018. He won the fight via rear-naked choke.

Soriano faced Bruce Boyington for the vacant featherweight belt at CES MMA 51 on August 3, 2018. Soriano lost the fight via rear-naked choke in the second round.

Soriano next faced Saul Almeida at CES MMA 57 on July 26, 2019. He won the fight via first-round knockout.

Soriano then faced Jose Mariscal at Cage Fury Fighting Championships 85 on September 18, 2020. He won the fight via unanimous decision.

Soriano faced Noad Lahat at UAE Warriors 18 on March 20, 2021. He won the fight via first-round knockout.

=== Return to UFC ===
Soriano was tabbed as a short notice replacement to face Christos Giagos on May 15, 2021 at UFC 262. He lost the bout via D'Arce choke in the second round.

Soriano faced Shayilan Nuerdanbieke on November 20, 2021 at UFC Fight Night 198. He lost the bout via unanimous decision.

On February 10, 2022, it was announced that Soriano was released by UFC.

=== Post UFC Part 2 ===
Soriano faced Paulo Silva on May 20, 2022 at Eagle FC 47. At weigh ins, Silva missed weight for the bout, weighing in at 156.6 pounds and was fined a percentage of his purse and the bout proceeded at catchweight. He lost the fight via split decision.

Soriano faced Ago Huskić at Gamebred FC 4 in a bare-knuckle MMA bout on May 5, 2023, winning the bout via TKO stoppage in the second round.

== Mixed martial arts record ==
Professional record breakdown
24 matches	15 wins	9 losses
By knockout	8	1
By submission	4	5
By decision	3	3

Res.	Record	Opponent	Method	Event	Date	Round	Time	Location	Notes
Win	15–9	Ago Huskić	TKO (punches)	Gamebred Fighting Championship 4	May 5, 2023	2	1:30	Fort Lauderdale, Florida, United States	Bare Knuckle MMA.
Loss	14–9	Paulo Silva	Decision (split)	Eagle FC 47	May 20, 2022	3	5:00	Miami, Florida, United States	Lightweight bout; Silva missed weight (156.6 lbs)
Loss	14–8	Shayilan Nuerdanbieke	Decision (unanimous)	UFC Fight Night: Vieira vs. Tate	November 20, 2021	3	5:00	Las Vegas, Nevada, United States	
Loss	14–7	Christos Giagos	Technical Submission (brabo choke)	UFC 262	May 15, 2021	2	0:59	Houston, Texas, United States	Lightweight bout.
Win	14–6	Noad Lahat	TKO (punches)	UAE Warriors 18	March 20, 2021	1	2:01	Abu Dhabi, United Arab Emirates	Catchweight (150 lb) bout.
Win	13–6	Jose Mariscal	Decision (unanimous)	Cage Fury FC 85	September 18, 2020	3	5:00	Tunica, Mississippi, United States	
Win	12–6	Saul Almeida	KO (punches)	CES MMA 57	July 26, 2019	1	1:22	Lincoln, Rhode Island, United States	Lightweight bout.
Loss	11–6	Bruce Boyington	Submission (rear-naked choke)	CES MMA 51	August 3, 2018	2	1:55	Lincoln, Rhode Island, United States	For the vacant CES Featherweight Championship.
Win	11–5	Jonathan Gary	Submission (rear-naked choke)	CES MMA 49	April 6, 2018	1	1:21	Lincoln, Rhode Island, United States	
Win	10–5	Jacob Bohn	TKO (leg kicks)	CES MMA 44	May 12, 2017	2	3:21	Lincoln, Rhode Island, United States	Return to Featherweight.
Loss	9–5	Levan Makashvili	Submission (rear-naked choke)	CES MMA 38	September 23, 2016	2	4:05	Lincoln, Rhode Island, United States	Catchweight (157 lb) bout; Makashvili missed weight.
Loss	9–4	Thomas Webb	TKO (punches)	Legacy FC 52	March 25, 2016	3	1:25	Lake Charles, Louisiana, United States	Catchweight (160 lb) bout.
Win	9–3	Josh Quayhagen	KO (punch)	Legacy FC 48	November 13, 2015	1	3:21	Lake Charles, Louisiana, United States	Lightweight debut.
Loss	8–3	Charles Rosa	Submission (D'Arce choke)	UFC Fight Night: McGregor vs. Siver	January 18, 2015	3	4:43	Boston, Massachusetts, United States	
Loss	8–2	Chas Skelly	Decision (unanimous)	UFC Fight Night: Jacare vs. Mousasi	September 5, 2014	3	5:00	Mashantucket, Connecticut, United States	
Loss	8–1	Tatsuya Kawajiri	Technical Submission (rear-naked choke)	UFC Fight Night: Saffiedine vs. Lim	January 4, 2014	2	0:50	Marina Bay, Singapore	
Win	8–0	Elvin Leon Brito	Decision (unanimous)	CFA 11	May 24, 2013	5	5:00	Coral Gables, Florida, United States	Defended the interim CFA Featherweight Championship.
Win	7–0	Victor Delgado	Decision (unanimous)	CFA 9	January 19, 2013	5	5:00	Coral Gables, Florida, United States	Won the interim CFA Featherweight Championship.
Win	6–0	Matthew Perry	Submission (rear-naked choke)	CFA 7	June 30, 2012	1	2:44	Coral Gables, Florida, United States	
Win	5–0	Lee Metcalf	KO (punches)	CES MMA: Extreme Measures	February 3, 2012	1	0:34	Lincoln, Rhode Island, United States	Catchweight (153 lb) bout.
Win	4–0	Lionel Young	Technical Submission (triangle choke)	AFO: Halloween Havoc 3	October 7, 2011	1	4:16	Mansfield, Massachusetts, United States	Catchweight (150 lb) bout.
Win	3–0	Denis Hernandez	TKO (doctor stoppage)	UCC 1: Merciless	March 19, 2010	2	5:00	Jersey City, New Jersey, United States	
Win	2–0	Mike Erosa	Submission (guillotine choke)	MAXX FC 4	June 19, 2009	2	1:25	Carolina, Puerto Rico	
Win	1–0	Erick Herrera	TKO (doctor stoppage)	CFX 2	June 5, 2009	1	5:00	Worcester, Massachusetts, United States	Featherweight debut.

== See also ==
- List of male mixed martial artists
