= Mats Nilsson =

Swedish judoka and mixed martial arts fighter

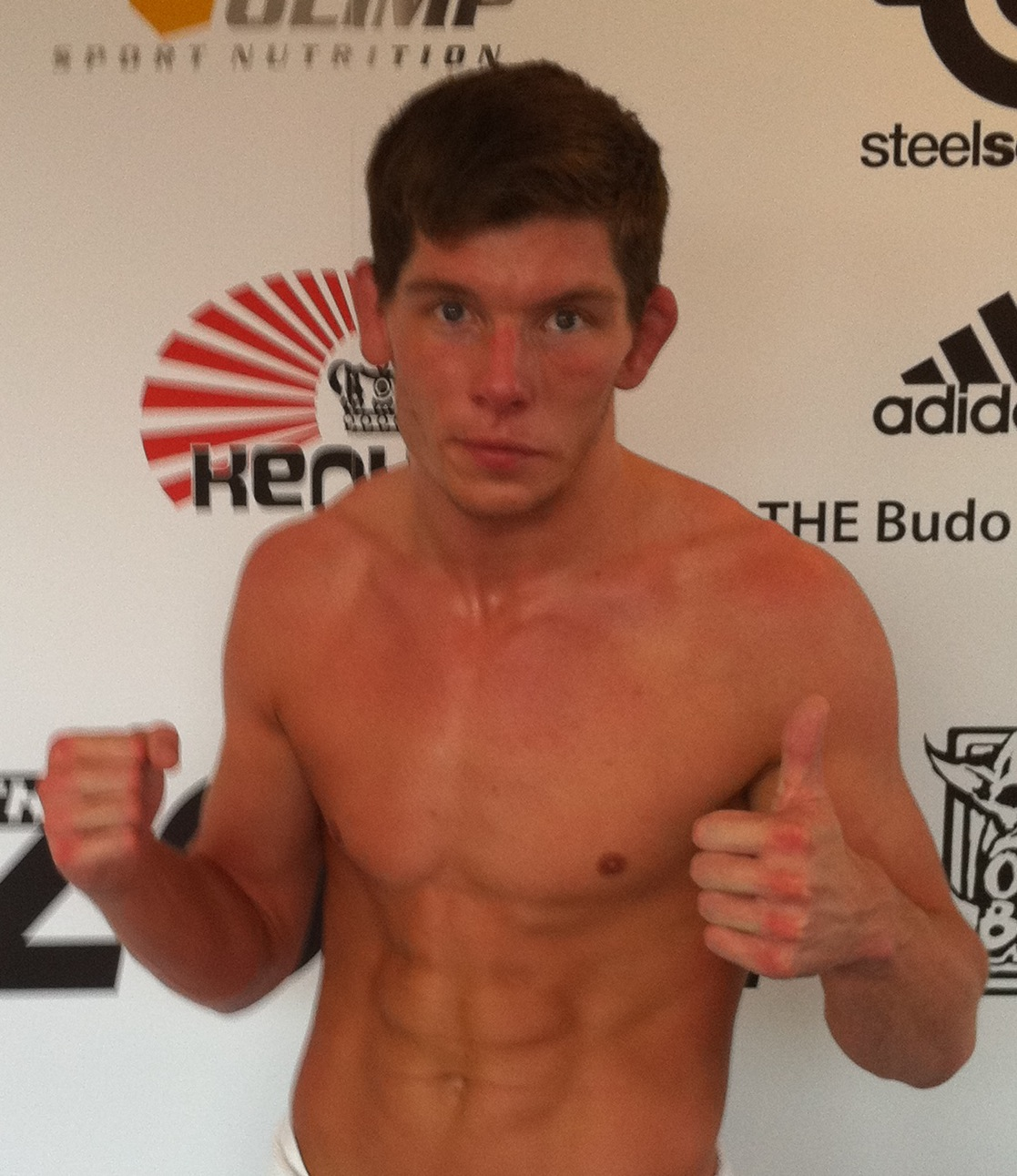
- Born: December 5, 1983 (age 42); Helsingborg, Sweden
- Nationality: Sweden
- Height: 6 ft 1 in (1.85 m)
- Weight: 170 lb (77 kg; 12 st)
- Division: Middleweight (2008–2014); Welterweight (2014–2015)
- Reach: 74.5 in (189 cm)
- Style: Brazilian Jiu-Jitsu, Judo, Submission Wrestling, Shootfighting, Muay Thai, Kickboxing
- Fighting out of: Copenhagen, Denmark
- Team: Rumble Sports, Kaisho Martial Arts
- Rank: Black belt in Brazilian Jiu-Jitsu; Black belt in Judo
- Years active: 2008–2015 (MMA)

Kickboxing record
- Total: 1
- Wins: 1
- By knockout: 1
- Losses: 0
- Draws: 0

Mixed martial arts record
- Total: 16
- Wins: 11
- By knockout: 2
- By submission: 5
- By decision: 4
- Losses: 4
- By knockout: 1
- By decision: 3
- Draws: 1

Other information
- Website: http://matsnilssonmma.com/
- Mixed martial arts record from Sherdog
- Last updated on: Sep 18, 2013

Mats Nilsson
Medal record

Grappling

FILA Grappling World Championship
Gold medal – first place	2012	-92 kg No-gi
Gold medal – first place	2011	-90 kg No-gi
Gold medal – first place	2010	-90 kg No-gi

FILA Grappling European Championship
Bronze medal – third place	2012	-92 kg No-gi
Bronze medal – third place	2011	-90 kg No-gi
Bronze medal – third place	2010	-90 kg No-gi

Mats Nilsson (born December 5, 1983) is a Swedish grappler and retired mixed martial artist. Nilsson formerly competed in the Welterweight division of the Ultimate Fighting Championship. He is the three time FILA Grappling world champion in the -90 kg no-gi and -92 kg no-gi division and a two-time bronze medalist in FILA Grappling European Championship. Nilsson holds a black belt in both Judo and Brazilian jiu-jitsu. He is currently fighting out of Rumble Sports, Copenhagen, Denmark, while representing Kaisho Martial Arts, Helsingborg, Sweden in grappling.

== Judo career ==
Nilsson started practicing judo at age of fifteen and this became a natural gateway to his interest for other martial arts. Nilsson's first success in Judo competition came when he secured first place in the Skåne junior class division in 1999. Nilsson's premier achievement within judo came when he placed in third at the Swedish junior championships in 2002. He also took third place in the Swedish youth championships in 2000. Nilsson currently holds a black belt in judo. Nilsson's Judo background can be seen in both his Submission wrestling and MMA arsenal as he utilizes judo sweeps, throws and takedowns.

== Brazilian Jiu-Jitsu ==
Alongside Judo, Nilsson is a Brazilian jiu-jitsu (BJJ) practitioner. After some years training Nilsson gained great success in the first Scandinavian Open in Brazilian jiu-jitsu in 2003. He placed second in the 210 lbs division and came in third in the open weight (Absolute Class). The following years resulted in many trips to the podium including a first place in the Danish Brazilian jiu-jitsu open where he competed in the 205 lbs division. Nilsson received a brown belt in Brazilian jiu-jitsu from Ricardo Carvalho in 2010. In September 2014 Nilsson received his black belt from Mauro Salomao.

== Submission Wrestling ==
Nilsson represents Kaisho Martial Arts, Helsingborg, Sweden, in Grappling competitions. Prior to the Fighter Extreme 2 championship many of Nilssons training partners practiced submission wrestling. This form of competition intrigued Nilsson who started practicing the discipline. His first success came at the Copenhagen Open SW where he took first place in the 200 lbs division. This was the beginning of a successful career within submission wrestling. Three years after the initial success in Copenhagen, Nilsson took third place at ADCC- Germany in the 190 lbs weight class. In 2009 he competed in the Swedish Championships in Submission wrestling for the first time. He left the championship with two medals. He placed third in his natural 200 lbs weight class and in the open weight competition Nilsson took home the silver medal.

After these results in the Swedish Championships as well as prior success in the sport, Nilsson was selected to represent the Swedish national team in the FILA Grappling World Championships in Kraków, Poland. In Kraków Nilsson defeated Takanori Kudo in the final to become 2010 FILA World Grappling Champion.

Following his win in the FILA Grappling World Championship, Nilsson was invited to Sportaccord Combat Games, which is the martial arts equivalent to the Olympic Games. The Sportaccord Combat Games were held in Beijing between August 28 and September 4, 2010. After two hard fought 1-0 losses Nilsson missed the podium and finished on fourth place.

Between September 24 and September 26 FILA's European Championship in Grappling were held in Gorlice, Poland. Nilsson fought three fights and finished in third place, ending up with a bronze medal.

Nilsson participated in the FILA Grappling Grand Prix that was held between the seventh and eight May 2011 in Martigny, Switzerland. He competed in the -90 kg weight class and after four wins, of which three was submission victories, he took home the gold medal.

The next grappling competition in Nilsson's calendar was the FILA Grappling European championship which was held in Yuzhne, Ukraine in June 2011. After going 2–1 in matches, 2 wins and one draw, he ended up with his second bronze medal from European Championships.

The Swedish Submission Wrestling Championship was held in July 2011. After losing the final with the closest margin possible Nilsson finished second after a loss against Alexander Bergman in the -91 kg division.

On 29 September 2011, Nilsson once again competed in the FILA Grappling World Championship this time held in Belgrade, Serbia. After his win the previous year Nilsson had chance to defend his world title. After winning three matches he once again became the World Champion of FILA Grappling winning his second consecutive world title in the -90 kg no-gi division.

On the 28 of July 2012 Nilsson won his third bronze at the FILA Grappling European Championship that took place in Brussels, Belgium, now in the -92 kg no-gi division.

The 17 of November 2012 Nilsson competed at the FILA Grappling World Championship in Kraków, Poland. After beating three opponents he was crowned the World Champion a third consecutive time. Nilsson won the final against top grappler Zbigniew Tyszka from Poland. Nilsson did not lose a single point during tournament. After the win, Nilsson announced his retirement from Submission Wrestling with the reason that he wanted to focus more on his MMA career and his family.

== Shootfighting ==
Following his success in submission wrestling, Brazilian jiu-jitsu and judo, Nilsson decided to try shootfighting. In 2007 Nilsson started competing in the Swedish shootfighting league. Later the same year Nilsson placed first in the Swedish Shootfighting Championships. Nilsson's shootfighting record stands at 6-0-0, with a win by decision against UFC fighter Alexander Gustafsson.

== Mixed martial arts ==
=== Early career ===
Nilsson began his Mixed Martial Arts career representing Kaisho Martial Arts, a gym he had been with since the beginning of his grappling training. He won his first fight via decision over Martin Lavin at The Zone FC - Showdown, May 10, 2008.

On May 7, 2010, Nilsson competed in his fifth professional fight, at The Cage: Spring Break against Mikko Koivumaki and Nilsson secured a second-round TKO victory. This earned him a shot at the champion of the -84 kg division, Timo Suhonen. At Cage Challenger on 18 September 2010 they fought for the belt. Nilsson lost the fight after three rounds by decision. Nilsson's next challenge was on November 27 when he faced Croatian Ivan Gluhak at The Zone FC 7 – Warriors. Nilsson won in devastating fashion as he submitted Gluhak in one minute via rear-naked-choke and soon got a new fight offer from The Zone FC. Nilsson fought Gregor Herb at The Zone - Inferno. The bout was highly anticipated because of the fighter's previous grappling credentials. Herb was the current European CBJJ brown belt champion and Nilsson the current FILA Grappling world champion. Nilsson won the hard-fought match by decision.

The 30th of March 2011 Nilsson entered Strength and Honor's middleweight Grand Prix to determine the champion. His first match was against Greek fighter Niko Sokolis (7-1). 30 seconds into the bout Sokolis was taken down to the ground by Nilsson with a slam so hard that the particle board under the canvas broke. After taking the fight to the mat Nilsson quickly mounted his opponent and secured a triangle choke for the tapout after a scramble. The Grand Prix Final was going to take place in September 2011 but it never materialized.

=== Cage Warriors and other organisations ===
On February 11, 2012, Nilsson defeated The Ultimate Fighter finalist Tom Speer via second round arm triangle choke at Cage Warriors Fight Night 3.

Nilsson's next fight was against Russian fighter Alavutdin Gadjiev in Strength & Honor Championship 5 which took place March 24 in Geneva, Switzerland. Nilsson won via armbar 0:24 in the first round. This was his last fight representing Kaisho Martial Arts in MMA.

On May 6, 2012, Nilsson fought fellow Swedish top middleweight prospect Tor Troéng on The Zone - Demolition in Gothenburg, Sweden. This was the first fight Nilsson represented Rumble Sports, Copenhagen. The Troeng vs Nilsson fight was named in Sherdog's "10 May Tussles Worth Watching". After three rounds Nilsson lost a unanimous decision.

On February 29, 2012, it became official that Nilsson signed an exclusive multi-fight deal with London based MMA organisation Cage Warriors. The contract begun after his fight at The Zone Fighting Championship - Demolition. Nilsson was expected to fight Denniston Sutherland on Cage Warriors 50 which took place the 8 of December 2012 in Glasgow, Scotland, but had to withdraw due to a torn LCL.

Nilsson fought for the first time in almost a year when he faced British fighter Chris Scott the 13th of April 2013. After three rounds Nilsson took home the decision victory.

On September 14 Nilsson fought Denniston Sutherland and took home the TKO win in the second round. Nilsson dominated the fight throughout the two rounds via takedowns and ground and pound.

=== Ultimate Fighting Championship ===
On December 17, 2013, it was announced that Nilsson had signed with the UFC to fight in their middleweight division. Nilsson made his UFC debut against Luke Barnatt on UFC Fight Night 37 on March 8, 2014, in London. He lost the fight via TKO due to strikes in the first round.

For his next fight, Nilsson dropped down to welterweight. He faced Omari Akhmedov on January 3, 2015, at UFC 182. He lost the fight by unanimous decision.

On January 17, 2015, Nilsson announced his retirement from MMA competition.

== Muay Thai ==
Before Nilsson's first Shootfighting fight 2006, he started training Muay Thai at Helsingborgs Muay Thai. Every year he spends some time in Thailand to improve his Muay Thai. In January 2012 he fought his first fight in the discipline in Phuket, Thailand, and won by knockout under the minute.

== Awards ==
Nilsson was nominated in four categories when the Swedish Martial Arts Gala 2011, Kampsportsgalan in Swedish, was held on 26 March 2011. He ended up winning two categories: Breakthrough of the Year and Champion of the Year. Nilsson was nominated in two categories at the 2012 Swedish Martial Arts Gala, Kampsportsgalan 2012, Champion of the Year and People's Award. For the second year in a row he won the Champion of the Year award.

In March 2013 Nilsson got nominated for Helsingborgsmedaljen (The Medal of Helsingborg). Former recipients include Gustaf VI Adolf of Sweden and Henrik Larsson.

On the monthly UK MMA Awards Nilsson won the International Fighter of the Month in September 2013.

== Mixed martial arts record ==
Professional record breakdown
16 matches	11 wins	4 losses
By knockout	2	1
By submission	5	0
By decision	4	3
Draws	1	

Res.	Record	Opponent	Method	Event	Date	Round	Time	Location	Notes
Loss	11–4–1	Omari Akhmedov	Decision (unanimous)	UFC 182	January 3, 2015	3	5:00	Las Vegas, Nevada, United States	Welterweight debut.
Loss	11–3–1	Luke Barnatt	TKO (head kick and punches)	UFC Fight Night: Gustafsson vs. Manuwa	March 8, 2014	1	4:24	London, England	
Win	11–2–1	Denniston Sutherland	TKO (punches)	CWFC 59	September 14, 2013	2	2:40	Cardiff, Wales	
Win	10–2–1	Chris Scott	Decision (unanimous)	CWFC 53	April 13, 2013	3	5:00	Glasgow, Scotland	
Loss	9–2–1	Tor Troéng	Decision (unanimous)	The Zone FC 10 - Demolition	May 6, 2012	3	5:00	Gothenburg, Sweden	
Win	9–1–1	Alavutdin Gadjiev	Submission (armbar)	Strength and Honor Championship 5	March 24, 2012	1	0:24	Geneva, Switzerland	
Win	8–1–1	Tom Speer	Submission (arm-triangle choke)	Cage Warriors Fight Night 3	February 11, 2012	2	4:10	Beirut, Lebanon	
Win	7–1–1	Nikos Sokolis	Submission (triangle choke)	Strength and Honor Championship 4	April 30, 2011	1	1:41	Geneva, Switzerland	
Win	6–1–1	Gregor Herb	Decision (unanimous)	The Zone FC 8 - Inferno	February 26, 2011	3	5:00	Gothenburg, Sweden	
Win	5–1–1	Ivan Gluhak	Submission (rear-naked choke)	The Zone FC 7 - Warriors	November 27, 2010	1	1:00	Gothenburg, Sweden	
Loss	4–1–1	Timo Suhonen	Decision (unanimous)	Cage - Challenger	September 18, 2010	3	5:00	Riihimäki, Finland	For the Cage Middleweight Championship.
Win	4–0–1	Mikko Koivumaki	TKO (punches)	Cage 13 - Spring Break	May 8, 2010	2	2:59	Vantaa, Finland	
Draw	3–0–1	Toni Linden	Draw	Shooto Finland - Helsinki Fight Night	November 28, 2009	2	5:00	Helsinki, Finland	
Win	3–0	Nick Osei	Decision (unanimous)	Fighter Gala 9	August 30, 2009	3	5:00	Elsinore, Denmark	
Win	2–0	Magnus Cedenblad	Submission (rear-naked choke)	The Zone FC 4 - Dynamite	April 25, 2009	1	3:49	Gothenburg, Sweden	
Win	1–0	Martin Lavin	Decision (unanimous)	The Zone FC 2 - Showdown	May 10, 2008	3	5:00	Gothenburg, Sweden	

== See also ==
- List of male mixed martial artists
