= UFC Fight Night: Belfort vs. Henderson 3 =

UFC mixed martial arts event in 2015

- The poster for UFC Fight Night: Belfort vs. Henderson 3
- Promotion: Ultimate Fighting Championship
- Date: November 7, 2015
- Venue: Ginásio do Ibirapuera
- City: São Paulo, Brazil
- Attendance: 10,628

Event chronology
UFC Fight Night: Holohan vs. Smolka	UFC Fight Night: Belfort vs. Henderson 3	UFC 193: Rousey vs. Holm

UFC Fight Night: Belfort vs. Henderson 3 (also known as UFC Fight Night 77) was a mixed martial arts event held on November 7, 2015, at the Ginásio do Ibirapuera in São Paulo, Brazil.

== Background ==
The event was the fourth held in São Paulo following UFC Ultimate Brazil (1998), UFC on FX: Belfort vs. Bisping (2013) and The Ultimate Fighter Brazil 3 Finale: Miocic vs. Maldonado (2014) and the twenty-fourth overall event to be held in Brazil.

The event was headlined by a middleweight trilogy bout between longtime multi-divisional contenders and champions Vitor Belfort and Dan Henderson. Henderson defeated Belfort in their first encounter in 2006 at Pride 32 via unanimous decision. Belfort defeated Henderson in their second encounter in 2013 at UFC Fight Night: Belfort vs. Henderson 2 via first round knockout.

Tom Lawlor was expected to face Fábio Maldonado at this event. However, Lawlor was forced to pull out due to injury and was replaced by The Ultimate Fighter 19 light heavyweight winner Corey Anderson.

On December 4, it was announced that Gleison Tibau was "provisionally suspended" by the United States Anti-Doping Agency (USADA) due to a potential failed out-of-competition drug test. On December 23, a second potential failed drug test, this time in-competition, was also announced. On February 16, Tibau announced he will drop his appeal and face the minimum punishment under the new rules, which is a two-year suspension. A day later, Tibau admitted he used erythropoietin out-of-competition thinking it "wouldn’t be anything" and that he thought he wasn't doing something wrong. Subsequently, on February 18, USADA announced Tibau's two-year suspension retroactive to the date of the fight and his win is now overturned to a loss, per the anti-doping policy of the Comissão Atlética Brasileira de MMA (CABMMA), which regulated the bout. Thus, Abel Trujillo's loss was overturned to a win.

== Results ==
Main Card (Fox Sports 1)
Weight class				Method	Round	Time	Notes
Middleweight	Vitor Belfort	def.	Dan Henderson	KO (head kick and punches)	1	2:07
Light Heavyweight	Glover Teixeira	def.	Patrick Cummins	TKO (punches)	2	1:12
Bantamweight	Thomas Almeida	def.	Anthony Birchak	KO (punches)	1	4:24
Lightweight	Alex Oliveira	def.	Piotr Hallmann	KO (punch)	3	0:51
Lightweight	Rashid Magomedov	def.	Gilbert Burns	Decision (unanimous) (30–27, 30–27, 30–27)	3	5:00
Light Heavyweight	Corey Anderson	def.	Fábio Maldonado	Decision (unanimous) (30–27, 30–27, 30–27)	3	5:00
Preliminary Card (Fox Sports 1)
Lightweight	Abel Trujillo	def.	Gleison Tibau	Disqualification (overturned)	1	1:45	(Note: Originally a technical submission (rear-naked choke) win for Tibau, the result was overturned due to Tibau testing positive for erythropoietin.)
Lightweight	Johnny Case	def.	Yan Cabral	Decision (unanimous) (29–28, 29–28, 29–28)	3	5:00
Featherweight	Thiago Tavares	def.	Clay Guida	Submission (guillotine choke)	1	0:39
Featherweight	Chas Skelly	def.	Kevin Souza	Submission (rear-naked choke)	2	1:56
Preliminary Card (UFC Fight Pass)
Welterweight	Viscardi Andrade	def.	Gasan Umalatov	Decision (unanimous) (30–27, 30–27, 29–28)	3	5:00
Bantamweight	Jimmie Rivera	def.	Pedro Munhoz	Decision (split) (29–28, 28–29, 29–28)	3	5:00
Bantamweight	Matheus Nicolau	def.	Bruno Korea	Submission (Japanese necktie)	3	3:27

== Bonus awards ==
The following fighters were awarded $50,000 bonuses:

- Fight of the Night: None awarded
- Performance of the Night: Vitor Belfort, Thomas Almeida, Alex Oliveira and Thiago Tavares

== See also ==
- List of UFC events
- 2015 in UFC
