= Nenad Lalović =

Serbian businessman and International Olympic Committee member

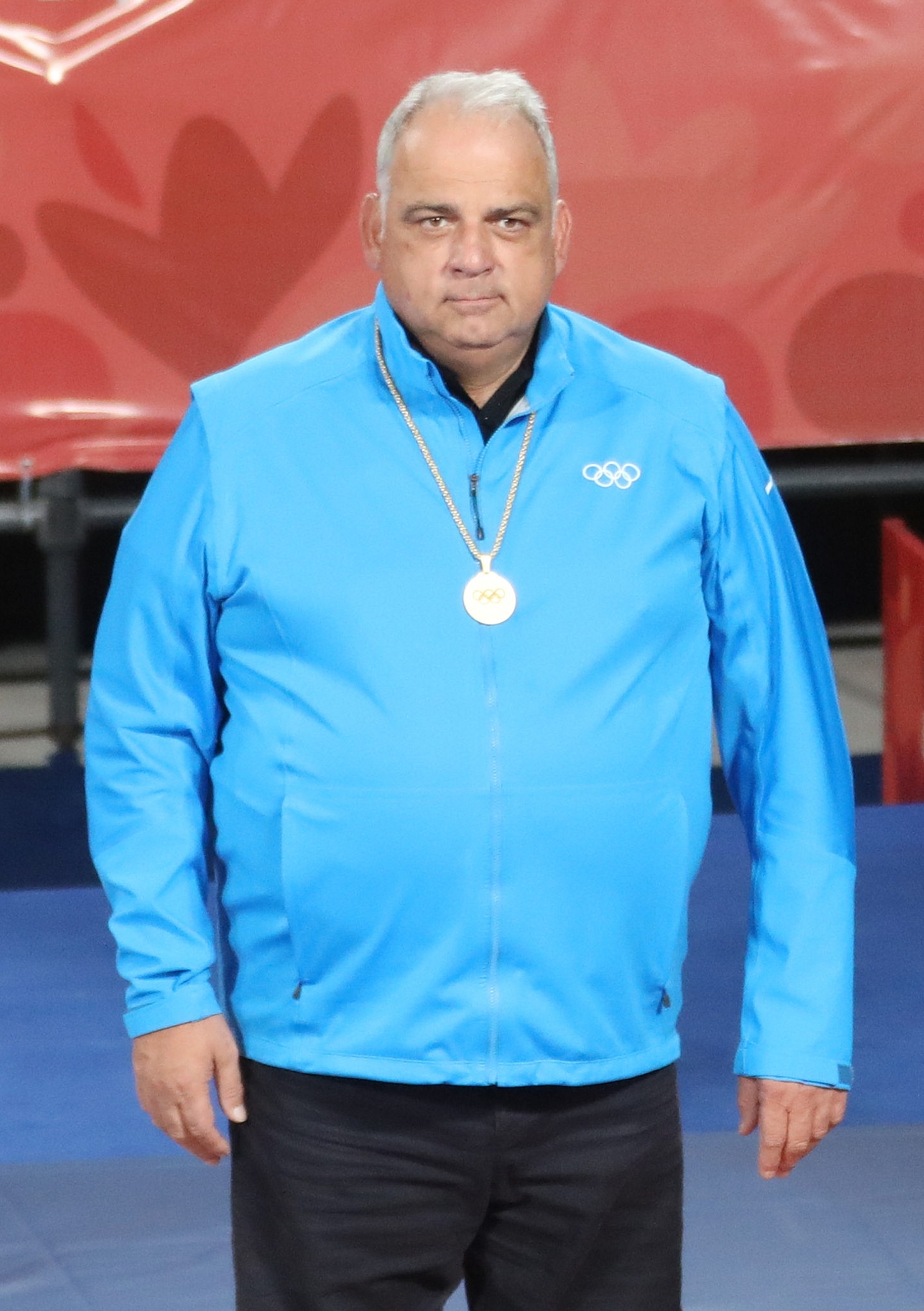
- IOC Executive board member Nenad Lalović at the Victory ceremony for the Boys' Greco-Roman 51 kg at the 2018 Buenos Aires Summer Youth Olympic Games held in Buenos Aires.

Executive board member of the International Olympic Committee
- In office 7 February 2018 – 4 February 2026
- IOC President: Thomas Bach (2018-25); Kirsty Coventry (2025-26)
- Preceded by: Wu Ching-kuo
- Succeeded by: Ingmar De Vos

President of the United World Wrestling
- Incumbent
- Assumed office 18 May 2013
- Preceded by: Raphaël Martinetti

Personal details
- Born: 21 August 1958 (age 68) Belgrade, PR Serbia, FPR Yugoslavia Serbia
- Spouse: Aleksandra Lalović
- Children: Milos Lalović and Nina Lalović
- Education: University of Novi Sad
- Occupation: Sports administrator

Nenad Lalović (Serbian Cyrillic: Ненад Лаловић; born 21 August 1958) is a Serbian businessman. He has been a member of the International Olympic Committee (IOC) since 2015.

== Education ==
He attended schools in Tunisia, Yugoslavia and Belgium and received his high school diploma in Geneva, where he then went on to study in Belgrade and received his diploma in Mechanical engineering from the University of Novi Sad.

== Career ==
Lalović was the manager of a travel agency and representative of various travel agencies on the Dalmatian coast in Croatia, as well as the manager of a rental car company. He founded a natural Shampoo company around 1995 when he moved to Russia to work in a construction company, where he is still an active partner.

== Sports career ==
On 18 May 2013, Lalović was appointed the position of President of the Serbian Wrestling Federation to serve the final two-years remaining from President Raphaël Martinetti after his resignation. In 2014, he became the President of United World Wrestling, which revolves around the two Olympic disciplines of Greco-Roman wrestling and Freestyle wrestling. Since 2015, Lalović has been a member of the executive committee of the World Anti-Doping Agency (WADA).

Lalović became a member of the IOC in 2015 and was a part of the Olympic Solidarity Committee. That year, he also became a member of the Foundation Board of the WADA. In 2018, he became a Member of the Association of Summer Olympic International Federations (ASOIF) and was also elected ASOIF representative to the IOC Executive Board.

== Awards ==
Lalović has received various Honorary Doctors, including one from the Tashkent State Technical University in Uzbekistan, and one from the Sofia University in Bulgaria. In 2019, he also received one from the university of Nur-Sultan in Kazakhstan.

Preceded by Raphaël Martinetti	President of the International Federation of Associated Wrestling Styles since 2013	Succeeded by
