= Patrick Cummins (fighter) =

American mixed martial arts fighter

- Born: November 16, 1980 (age 45); Doylestown, Pennsylvania, U.S.
- Other names: Durkin
- Height: 6 ft 2 in (1.88 m)
- Weight: 205 lb (93 kg; 14.6 st)
- Division: Light heavyweight
- Reach: 76 in (193 cm)
- Stance: Orthodox
- Fighting out of: Las Vegas, Nevada, U.S.
- Team: Syndicate MMA (2019); Kings MMA (formerly)
- Wrestling: NCAA Division I Wrestling
- Years active: 2010–2019

Mixed martial arts record
- Total: 17
- Wins: 10
- By knockout: 4
- By submission: 2
- By decision: 4
- Losses: 7
- By knockout: 5
- By submission: 1
- By decision: 1

Other information
- University: Penn State University
- Mixed martial arts record from Sherdog

Patrick Durkin Cummins (born November 16, 1980) is an American retired mixed martial artist who formerly competed in the Light heavyweight division of the Ultimate Fighting Championship. A professional competitor since 2010, he has formerly competed for Strikeforce.

== Mixed martial arts career ==
=== Early career ===
Cummins participated in many sports, including wrestling and football, while at Warwick High School in Lititz, Pennsylvania. As a college wrestler for Penn State University, Cummins was a two-time NCAA Division I All-American. He finished 4th and 2nd at the 2003 and 2004 national championships respectively, as well as being a two-time US National Team Member in freestyle wrestling.

Cummins transitioned to mixed martial arts in 2010 after pleading guilty to felony burglary. He made his professional debut on December 4, 2010, facing Terrell Brown at Strikeforce: Henderson vs. Babalu II. Cummins won his debut fight by first round TKO but his fight career stalled after he was sentenced to jail.

Cummins fought Tasi Edwards at ProElite 3 on January 21, 2012. He won the fight via arm-triangle.

Cummins then fought Ricky Pulu at Xplode Fight Series: Revancha on March 16, 2013. He won via first round TKO.

In what would be his last fight before signing with UFC, Cummins faced Willie Smalls at SCL: Chaos in the Cage on May 18, 2013. Cummins won via guillotine choke submission.

=== Ultimate Fighting Championship ===
In February 2014, Cummins replaced the injured Rashad Evans against Daniel Cormier on February 22, 2014, at UFC 170. He lost the fight by first round TKO.

For his second fight with the promotion, Cummins was scheduled to fight Francimar Barroso on June 7, 2014, at UFC Fight Night 42. However, Barroso was forced out of the bout due to an injury and replaced by promotional newcomer Roger Narvaez. Cummins won the fight via second round TKO.

Cummins faced Kyle Kingsbury on July 26, 2014, at UFC on Fox 12. He won the fight via unanimous decision.

Cummins faced Antônio Carlos Júnior on December 20, 2014, at UFC Fight Night 58. He won the fight by unanimous decision.

Cummins faced Ovince Saint Preux on April 18, 2015, at UFC on Fox 15. He lost the fight via knockout in the first round.

Cummins faced Rafael Cavalcante on August 1, 2015, at UFC 190. He won the fight via TKO due to elbows in the third round.

Cummins faced Glover Teixeira on November 7, 2015, at UFC Fight Night 77. He lost the fight via TKO in the second round.

Cummins next faced Antônio Rogério Nogueira on May 14, 2016, at UFC 198. He lost the fight via TKO in the first round.

Cummins was expected to face Gian Villante on December 9, 2016, at UFC Fight Night 102. However, Cummins pulled out of the fight on December 2 citing a staph infection. He was replaced by promotional newcomer Saparbek Safarov.

Cummins faced Jan Błachowicz on April 8, 2017, at UFC 210. He won the bout by majority decision.

A rescheduled bout with Gian Villante eventually took place on July 22, 2017, at UFC on Fox 25. Cummins won the back-and-forth fight via split decision.

Cummins faced Corey Anderson on November 4, 2017, at UFC 217. However on October 17, Cummins pulled out from the fight due to a resistant staph infection. The fight was rescheduled to UFC Fight Night 128 on April 21, 2018. He lost the fight via unanimous decision.

Cummins faced Misha Cirkunov on October 27, 2018, at UFC Fight Night 138. He lost the fight by submission in the first round via an arm triangle choke.

Cummins faced Ed Herman on May 18, 2019, at UFC Fight Night 152. He lost the fight via TKO in the first round.

Cummins announced his retirement from the sport on December 24, 2019.

== Grappling career ==
Cummins faced Blake Stewart at Spokane Submission Series 4 on March 1, 2025. He lost the match by submission.

== Championships and accomplishments ==
- Ultimate Fighting Championship
  - UFC.com Awards
    - 2014: Ranked #7 Newcomer of the Year
    - 2015: Ranked #10 Upset of the Year vs. Rafael Cavalcante

== Mixed martial arts record ==
Professional record breakdown
17 matches	10 wins	7 losses
By knockout	4	5
By submission	2	1
By decision	4	1

Res.	Record	Opponent	Method	Event	Date	Round	Time	Location	Notes
Loss	10–7	Ed Herman	TKO (knee and punches)	UFC Fight Night: dos Anjos vs. Lee	May 18, 2019	1	3:39	Rochester, New York, United States	
Loss	10–6	Misha Cirkunov	Submission (arm-triangle choke)	UFC Fight Night: Volkan vs. Smith	October 27, 2018	1	2:40	Moncton, New Brunswick, Canada	
Loss	10–5	Corey Anderson	Decision (unanimous)	UFC Fight Night: Barboza vs. Lee	April 21, 2018	3	5:00	Atlantic City, New Jersey, United States	
Win	10–4	Gian Villante	Decision (split)	UFC on Fox: Weidman vs. Gastelum	July 22, 2017	3	5:00	Uniondale, New York, United States	
Win	9–4	Jan Błachowicz	Decision (majority)	UFC 210	April 8, 2017	3	5:00	Buffalo, New York, United States	
Loss	8–4	Antônio Rogério Nogueira	TKO (punches)	UFC 198	May 14, 2016	1	4:52	Curitiba, Brazil	
Loss	8–3	Glover Teixeira	TKO (punches)	UFC Fight Night: Belfort vs. Henderson 3	November 7, 2015	2	1:12	São Paulo, Brazil	
Win	8–2	Rafael Cavalcante	TKO (elbows)	UFC 190	August 1, 2015	3	0:45	Rio de Janeiro, Brazil	
Loss	7–2	Ovince Saint Preux	KO (punches)	UFC on Fox: Machida vs. Rockhold	April 18, 2015	1	4:54	Newark, New Jersey, United States	
Win	7–1	Antônio Carlos Júnior	Decision (unanimous)	UFC Fight Night: Machida vs. Dollaway	December 20, 2014	3	5:00	Barueri, Brazil	
Win	6–1	Kyle Kingsbury	Decision (unanimous)	UFC on Fox: Lawler vs. Brown	July 26, 2014	3	5:00	San Jose, California, United States	
Win	5–1	Roger Narvaez	TKO (punches)	UFC Fight Night: Henderson vs. Khabilov	June 7, 2014	2	2:28	Albuquerque, New Mexico, United States	
Loss	4–1	Daniel Cormier	TKO (punches)	UFC 170	February 22, 2014	1	1:19	Las Vegas, Nevada, United States	
Win	4–0	Willie Smalls	Submission (guillotine choke)	Sparta Combat League: Chaos in the Cage	May 18, 2013	1	3:19	Denver, Colorado, United States	
Win	3–0	Ricky Pulu	TKO (punches)	Xplode Fight Series: Revancha	March 16, 2013	1	1:07	Valley Center, California, United States	Light heavyweight debut.
Win	2–0	Tasi Edwards	Submission (arm-triangle choke)	ProElite 3: Da Spyder vs. Minowaman	January 21, 2012	1	4:01	Honolulu, Hawaii, United States	Catchweight (215 lbs) bout.
Win	1–0	Terrell Brown	TKO (punches)	Strikeforce: Henderson vs. Babalu II	December 4, 2010	1	2:44	St. Louis, Missouri, United States	Catchweight (208 lbs) bout.

== See also ==
- List of current UFC fighters
- List of male mixed martial artists
