= Chas Skelly =

American mixed martial artist (born 1985)

- Born: May 11, 1985 (age 41); Bedford, Texas, U.S.
- Other names: The Scrapper
- Height: 5 ft 11 in (1.80 m)
- Weight: 146 lb (66 kg; 10.4 st)
- Division: Lightweight; Featherweight
- Reach: 73 in (185 cm)
- Fighting out of: Keller, Texas, U.S.
- Team: Team Takedown
- Wrestling: NAIA Wrestling
- Years active: 2009–2022

Mixed martial arts record
- Total: 23
- Wins: 19
- By knockout: 4
- By submission: 10
- By decision: 5
- Losses: 3
- By knockout: 1
- By decision: 2
- No contests: 1

Other information
- Mixed martial arts record from Sherdog

Chas Skelly (born May 11, 1985) is an American retired mixed martial artist who competed in the featherweight division of the Ultimate Fighting Championship. A professional since 2009, he has also competed for Bellator MMA and Legacy Fighting Championship.

== Background ==
Skelly was born in Bedford, Texas, but moved to Pennsylvania at a young age. Skelly began wrestling at the age of five and later moved back to Texas, attending Azle High School where he also played baseball and football, but quit the latter two sports when he was a senior to focus on wrestling. He held an overall record of 164-3, was a four-year letterman, and won a state championship during his senior year in 2003 while competing in the 140 lbs. division. Skelly continued wrestling at the collegiate level for Missouri Baptist University and Oklahoma City University where he earned All-American honors with a 7th-place finish at nationals while at Missouri Baptist l

He began mixed martial arts after he became a wrestling partner for former UFC fighter Johnny Bedford.[3][4]

== Mixed martial arts career ==
=== Early career ===
Skelly made his professional MMA debut in 2009 and won his first two fights in the first round via submission and TKO, respectively. Less than a month after the latter win, he was signed by Bellator MMA.

=== Bellator MMA ===
Skelly made his Bellator debut at Bellator 9 on May 29, 2009, and won the fight via split decision.

Still undefeated, Skelly won his next three consecutive fights before making his next appearance for the organization on May 20, 2010, at Bellator 19, facing Daniel Pineda. Skelly had previously defeated Pineda via submission and defeated him again in the rematch via kneebar.

After a two-year layoff due to injuries, Skelly again won his next three consecutive fights before his next appearance for the organization at Bellator 96 on June 19, 2013. He faced Jarrod Card and won via unanimous decision.

=== Ultimate Fighting Championship ===
In March 2014, it was announced that Skelly has signed with the UFC. He made his debut against Mirsad Bektić on April 19, 2014, at UFC on Fox: Werdum vs. Browne. He lost via majority decision. The fight was nearly stopped in the second round as Skelly landed a pair of illegal knees as Bektić was grounded against the cage, prompting the referee to deduct a point and allow him five minutes to recover. Bektić clearly was hurt and wobbled as he returned to his feet but was able to continue after a brief break.

In his second fight for the promotion, Skelly faced Tom Niinimäki on August 23, 2014, at UFC Fight Night 49. He won the fight via submission in the first round.

After taking virtually no damage during his fight with Niinimäki, Skelly faced Sean Soriano on September 5, 2014, at UFC Fight Night 50, replacing an injured Andre Fili. He won the fight via unanimous decision and set the modern era record for shortest time in between UFC wins at 13 days.

Skelly faced Jim Alers on February 14, 2015, at UFC Fight Night 60. He won the fight via TKO in the closing seconds of the second round.

Skelly was briefly linked to a bout against Hacran Dias on June 27, 2015, at UFC Fight Night 70. However, Skelly was pulled from the card in early June due to illness and replaced by Levan Makashvili.

Skelly faced Kevin Souza on November 7, 2015, at UFC Fight Night 77. Despite being rocked a number of times by Souza's punches, Skelly rallied and won the fight via submission in the second round.

Skelly next faced Darren Elkins on March 5, 2016, at UFC 196. He lost the fight by unanimous decision.

Skelly faced Maximo Blanco on September 17, 2016, at UFC Fight Night 94. He won the fight via submission in the fight's opening minute and was awarded a Performance of the Night bonus.

Skelly faced Chris Gruetzemacher on February 4, 2017, at UFC Fight Night 104. He won the fight via submission in the second round.

Skelly faced Jason Knight on May 13, 2017, at UFC 211. He lost the fight via TKO in the third round. He received a 180-day medical suspension to recover from his injuries.

After more than one year absent from competing, Skelly faced newcomer Bobby Moffett on November 10, 2018, at UFC Fight Night 139. He lost the fight via technical submission. Subsequently, Skelly appealed to the Colorado Office of Combative Sports on grounds of referee error regarding the stoppage. Eventually on June 24, 2020, Skelly announced on his social media account that the result was overturned to no contest.

Skelly was expected to face Jordan Griffin on June 29, 2019, at UFC on ESPN 3. However, on June 13, 2019, Skelly pulled out of the fight citing injury. The pairing eventually took place on September 14, 2019, at UFC on ESPN+ 16. Skelly won the fight by unanimous decision.

Skelly was scheduled to meet Grant Dawson on January 18, 2020, at UFC 246. However, on January 14, 2020, Dawson announced on his personal social media that he was forced to withdraw from the bout. The bout was rescheduled on February 29, 2020, at UFC Fight Night 169. On February 7, 2020, it was reported that Skelly was injured during one of his training sessions and was forced to withdraw from the event.

Skelly was scheduled to face Jamall Emmers February 20, 2021, at UFC Fight Night 185. However, the bout was cancelled moments before it was expected to begin as Emmers suffered back spasms backstage.

Skelly was expected to face Michael Trizano on October 9, 2021, at UFC Fight Night 194. However, two weeks before the event, Skelly was removed from the bout for undisclosed reasons and the bout was cancelled.

Skelly faced Mark Striegl in what he announced as his retirement bout on February 19, 2022, at UFC Fight Night 201. He won the fight via TKO in the second round.

== Championships and accomplishments ==
- Ultimate Fighting Championship
  - Performance of the Night (One Time) vs. Maximo Blanco
  - Tied (Daniel Pineda, Brian Ortega, Makwan Amirkhani & Youssef Zalal) for second most submissions in UFC Featherweight division history (4)
  - Second most submission attempts in UFC Featherweight division history (17)
  - Fastest submission in UFC/WEC history in the featherweight division (0:19 vs Maximo Blanco)
  - UFC.com Awards
    - 2016: Ranked #4 Submission of the Year vs. Maximo Blanco

== Mixed martial arts record ==
Professional record breakdown
23 matches	19 wins	3 losses
By knockout	4	1
By submission	10	0
By decision	5	2
No contests	1	

Res.	Record	Opponent	Method	Event	Date	Round	Time	Location	Notes
Win	19–3 (1)	Mark Striegl	TKO (knee and punches)	UFC Fight Night: Walker vs. Hill	February 19, 2022	2	2:01	Las Vegas, Nevada, United States	
Win	18–3 (1)	Jordan Griffin	Decision (unanimous)	UFC Fight Night: Cowboy vs. Gaethje	September 14, 2019	3	5:00	Vancouver, British Columbia, Canada	
NC	17–3 (1)	Bobby Moffett	NC (overturned)	UFC Fight Night: The Korean Zombie vs. Rodríguez	November 10, 2018	2	2:43	Denver, Colorado, United States	Originally a submission (brabo choke) win for Moffett; overturned after Skelly appealed the loss due to a controversial referee call.
Loss	17–3	Jason Knight	TKO (punches)	UFC 211	May 13, 2017	3	0:39	Dallas, Texas, United States	
Win	17–2	Chris Gruetzemacher	Submission (rear-naked choke)	UFC Fight Night: Bermudez vs. The Korean Zombie	February 4, 2017	2	2:01	Houston, Texas, United States	
Win	16–2	Maximo Blanco	Technical Submission (anaconda choke)	UFC Fight Night: Poirier vs. Johnson	September 17, 2016	1	0:19	Hidalgo, Texas, United States	Performance of the Night.
Loss	15–2	Darren Elkins	Decision (unanimous)	UFC 196	March 5, 2016	3	5:00	Las Vegas, Nevada, United States	
Win	15–1	Kevin Souza	Submission (rear-naked choke)	UFC Fight Night: Belfort vs. Henderson 3	November 7, 2015	2	1:56	São Paulo, Brazil	
Win	14–1	Jim Alers	TKO (punches and knee)	UFC Fight Night: Henderson vs. Thatch	February 14, 2015	2	4:59	Broomfield, Colorado, United States	
Win	13–1	Sean Soriano	Decision (unanimous)	UFC Fight Night: Jacare vs. Mousasi	September 5, 2014	3	5:00	Mashantucket, Connecticut, United States	
Win	12–1	Tom Niinimäki	Submission (rear-naked choke)	UFC Fight Night: Henderson vs. dos Anjos	August 23, 2014	1	2:35	Tulsa, Oklahoma, United States	
Loss	11–1	Mirsad Bektić	Decision (majority)	UFC on Fox: Werdum vs. Browne	April 19, 2014	3	5:00	Orlando, Florida, United States	
Win	11–0	Jarrod Card	Decision (unanimous)	Bellator 96	June 19, 2013	3	5:00	Thackerville, Oklahoma, United States	
Win	10–0	Rey Trujilo	TKO (punches)	Legacy FC 16	December 14, 2012	3	4:52	Dallas, Texas, United States	
Win	9–0	Luis Vegas	Decision (unanimous)	PFS: Premier Fight Series 1	July 28, 2012	3	5:00	Fort Worth, Texas, United States	
Win	8–0	Jeremy Myers	Submission (D'Arce choke)	XKO 15	June 2, 2012	1	2:59	Arlington, Texas, United States	Catchweight (150 lb) bout.
Win	7–0	Daniel Pineda	Submission (kneebar)	Bellator 19	May 20, 2010	2	2:16	Grand Prairie, Texas, United States	
Win	6–0	Tim Snyder	Submission (rear-naked choke)	KOK 8: The Uprising	February 27, 2010	2	2:22	Austin, Texas, United States	
Win	5–0	Daniel Pineda	Submission (choke)	SWC 8: Night of Rumble	September 18, 2009	1	2:12	Frisco, Texas, United States	
Win	4–0	Jimmy Guzman	Submission (choke)	URC 5: Ultimate Rumble Championships	July 18, 2009	2	1:55	Conroe, Texas, United States	
Win	3–0	Mike Braswell	Decision (split)	Bellator 9	May 29, 2009	3	5:00	Monroe, Louisiana, United States	Lightweight bout.
Win	2–0	Joshua Gerber	TKO (punches)	XKO: Xtreme Knockout 4	May 9, 2009	1	1:59	Arlington, Texas, United States	
Win	1–0	Will Samuels	Submission (choke)	XKO: Xtreme Knockout 3	March 14, 2009	1	2:57	Arlington, Texas, United States	

== See also ==
- List of male mixed martial artists
