= FILA grappling =

Non-striking hybrid combat sport

UWW Grappling
- Also known as: FILA Grappling
- Focus: Grappling
- Hardness: Full contact
- Creator: United World Wrestling (formerly International Federation of Associated Wrestling Styles)
- Parenthood: Catch Wrestling, Brazilian Jiu Jitsu, Judo, Freestyle wrestling, Sambo
- Olympic sport: No

UWW Grappling, formerly known as FILA Grappling, is a non-striking hybrid combat sport sanctioned by United World Wrestling (UWW), formerly the International Federation of Associated Wrestling Styles (FILA).

A form of submission wrestling influenced by catch wrestling, freestyle wrestling, Brazilian jiu-jitsu, judo, and sambo, UWW Grappling allows various submission holds which replace the pin/fall from wrestling. These submission moves can be applied to force opponents to concede by "tapping out" or verbally submitting to the referee. In 2013 FILA ceased sanctioning the sport amid the turmoil regarding the potential removal of wrestling from the Olympic program.

In September 2014, FILA changed its name to United World Wrestling (UWW) and reintroduced Grappling while creating a new World Grappling Committee under UWW authority.

== History ==
In 2004, Jason Townsend and members of the Titan Wrestling Club at Cal State Fullerton, including Chris Carlino and Art Barker, started developing a set of rules and an official international rulebook for grappling. This wrestling club served as a platform for testing these rules, and a series of test events were organized across the country under the International Submission Wrestling Association (ISWA), led by Townsend.

The ISWA applied for admission with the General Association of International Sports Federations (GAISF), which in turn contacted FILA regarding the application. This led to a meeting in Abu Dhabi between FILA President Raphaël Martinetti and Jason Townsend. Martinetti proposed that ISWA allow FILA to adopt its rulebook and integrate into FILA's new World Grappling Committee, led by Jean-Francois Court and Anne Pellaud. The ISWA agreed, seeing FILA as the best path forward for the sport.

FILA and ISWA representatives also met with Sheikh Tahnoun Bin Zayed Al Nahyan of the Abu Dhabi Combat Club, Guy Neivens, and Renzo Gracie. However, FILA couldn't reach an agreement with the ADCC, which ultimately did not participate in FILA's amateur grappling development. Townsend was appointed as the Head of Grappling Panamerica in FILA's "Associated Styles" department.

In 2007, FILA started its inaugural grappling season, culminating in the first unofficial World Championships in Antalya, Turkey, during the 2007 World Wrestling Games. Team USA dominated, winning all 9 gold medals with prominent athletes like Jeff Monson, Ricky Lundell, Darren Uyenoyama, and Felicia Oh.

== Mat ==
The UWW-approved grappling mat measures 9-metre (30 ft) in diameter, including a 1.5-metre (4.9 ft) border known as the protection area. An orange band 1-metre (3.3 ft) in width is drawn along the inside of the circumference to indicate the passivity zone. The area inside the passivity zone is called the central wrestling area, which measures 7-metre (23 ft) in diameter.

For Championship competitions, the mat may be installed on a platform between 1.1-metre (3.6 ft) or 0.8-metre (2.6 ft) in height.

== Rules ==
=== Uniform ===
Since various forms of submission fighting are traditionally practiced both with and without gi, FILA implemented both trends in order to cover the full spectrum of techniques associated to each particular style. Therefore, FILA tournaments generally had gi and no-gi divisions to enable all submission fighters to compete to their highest ability no matter what their fighting background might be. The FILA grappling gi practitioner's uniform was similar to a judogi, but often with tighter cuffs on the pants and jacket. No-gi grapplers wore FILA-approved shorts and a tight-fitting sleeveless, short sleeve or long sleeve rashguard. Grapplers were not required to wear shoes during the match, but those who chose to wear shoes needed to wear ones approved by FILA.

=== Matches ===
==== Duration ====
UWW senior grappling matches are a single round of 5 minutes.

==== Scoring ====
The FILA grappling regulations were based on a progressive point system that encourages submissions over technical points. Points were awarded for takedowns and dominant control positions according to the following progression: side mount < full mount < back mount. Once having reached a position and secured it for 3 seconds, additional points could only be scored if a higher position is achieved. The progression was reset if the opponent managed to bring the fight back to neutral (be it standing or on the ground) or to score a dominant control position in his or her turn.

A takedown is worth 2 points when an athlete transitions from stand-up to the ground while maintaining top control for three seconds. If a competitor pulls guard, the opponent is awarded 2 points if they maintain top control for three seconds. Additional points can also be scored if a competitor establishes the following positions:

- Side mount: 2 points (takedown) + 3 points (side mount) = 5 total points
- Full mount: 2 points (takedown) + 4 points (full mount) = 6 total points
- Back mount: 2 points (takedown) + 4 points (back mount) = 6 total points

A competitor can score 2 points for a reversal by escaping from a bottom or disadvantageous position and gains top control for at least three seconds.

A competitor can score 3 points by maintaining control for three seconds from side mount, 4 points by maintaining control for three seconds from full mount, and 4 points by maintaining control for three seconds from back mount.

==== Points ====
FILA grappling rules contrasted with wrestling's greater emphasis on takedowns, due to its radically different point-scoring system. This has led to greater time dedicated to training on the ground, resulting in enhancement and evolution of groundwork techniques by grapplers.

== UWW Grappling weight classes ==
=== Men's grappling ===
- 62 kg (137 lb)
- 66 kg (146 lb)
- 71 kg (157 lb)
- 77 kg (170 lb)
- 84 kg (185 lb)
- 92 kg (203 lb)
- 100 kg (220 lb)
- 130 kg (287 lb)

=== Women's grappling ===
- 53 kg (117 lb)
- 58 kg (128 lb)
- 64 kg (141 lb)
- 71 kg (157 lb)
- 90 kg (198 lb)

== World Grappling Championship ==
World Grappling Championship
- Status: Active
- Genre: Sports event
- Frequency: Annual
- Location: Various
- Inaugurated: 2007
- Organiser: United World Wrestling

The World Grappling Championship was the most important of FILA's annual Grappling tournaments. The first of these competitions took place on in 2007, with the last taking place in 2013.

Since FILA's renaming to UWW, the World Grappling Championships have continued to be hosted under the UWW banner, with the 2023 World Championships taking place in Warsaw, Poland.

=== FILA World Grappling Championships ===
Year	City and host country
2007 FILA World Grappling Championships	Antalya, Turkey
2008 FILA World Grappling Championships	Lucerne, Switzerland
2009 FILA World Grappling Championships	(United States) Fort Lauderdale, USA
2010 FILA World Grappling Championships	Kraków, Poland
2011 FILA World Grappling Championships	Belgrade, Serbia
2012 FILA World Grappling Championships	Kraków, Poland
2013 FILA World Grappling Championships	London, Canada

=== UWW World Grappling Championships ===
Year	City and host country
2015 UWW World Grappling Championships	Antalya, Turkey
2016 UWW World Grappling Championships	Minsk, Belarus
2017 UWW World Grappling Championships	Baku, Azerbaijan
2018 UWW World Grappling Championships	Astana, Kazakhstan
2019 UWW World Grappling Championships	Nur-Sultan, Kazakhstan
2021 UWW World Grappling Championships	Belgrade, Serbia
2022 UWW World Grappling Championships	Belgrade, Serbia
2023 UWW World Grappling Championships	Warsaw, Poland
2024 UWW World Grappling Championships	Astana, Kazakhstan
2025 UWW World Grappling Championships	(Serbia) Novi Sad, Siberia

== See also ==
- Brazilian jiu-jitsu
- Wrestling
- Catch wrestling
- Sambo
- Pankration
- Submission wrestling
