= United World Wrestling =

Wrestling governing body

- Abbreviation: UWW
- Formation: 1921; 105 years ago
- Founded at: Stockholm, Sweden
- Type: Sports federation
- Headquarters: Corsier-sur-Vevey, Switzerland
- Members: Representatives from 176 national federations
- President: Nenad Lalović
- Revenue: US$5.12 million (2017)
- Expenses: US$8.89 million (2017)
- Website: uww.org

United World Wrestling (UWW) is the international governing body for the sport of wrestling; its duties include overseeing wrestling at the World Championships and Olympics. It presides over international competitions for various forms of wrestling, including Greco-Roman, freestyle, grappling, and others. The flagship event of UWW is the World Wrestling Championships.

== History ==
The UWW was formerly known as the International Amateur Wrestling Federation (IAWF) from 1921 to 1952 and the Fédération Internationale des Luttes Associées (FILA) prior to assuming its current name in September 2014.

== Disciplines ==
As of 2016, UWW sets rules and regulations and holds international competitions in the following wrestling styles:

Olympic styles

- Greco-Roman wrestling
- Freestyle wrestling (men's and women's)

Associated styles

- FILA grappling (Gi and no-Gi)
- Beach wrestling (recognized by the FILA Congress in 2004)
- Amateur pankration (recognized by the FILA Congress in 2010)
- Amateur Mixed Martial Arts
- Traditional wrestling
  - Senegalese wrestling
  - Alysh / Belt wrestling (recognized by the FILA Congress in 2008)
  - Kurash Belt wrestling
  - Pahlavani wrestling
  - Belbogli Kurash 2019
  - Kazakh Quresi 2014

Adaptations to the international regulations set by UWW are usually made by each national federation for all national and regional competitions.

- Former: Sambo

== Events ==
Wrestling Championships held:

#	Events	First
1	World Wrestling Championships	1950 (Official)
2	Ranking Series	2018
3	Wrestling World Cup	1973
4	U23 World Wrestling Championships	2017
5	U20 World Wrestling Championships	1969
6	U17 World Wrestling Championships	1975
7	World Veterans Wrestling Championships	1992
8	World Beach Wrestling Championships	2006
9	World Espoir Wrestling Championships	1983-1995 (Defunct)
10	World Wrestling Clubs Cup	2014
11	World Military Wrestling Championships	1961
12	World University Wrestling Championships	1968
13	UWW World Pahlavani Wrestling Championships	2016
14	UWW World Grappling Wrestling Championships	2008
15	UWW World Pankration Wrestling Championships	2009
16	UWW World Belt Wrestling Championships	2014

== Presidents ==
- (Sweden) Einar Råberg (1921–1924)
- (Hungary) Alfréd Brüll (1924–1930)
- (Finland) Viktor Smeds (1930–1952)
- (France) Roger Coulon (1952–1971)
- (Socialist Federal Republic of Yugoslavia) (Serbia and Montenegro) Milan Ercegan (1971–2002)
- (Switzerland) Raphaël Martinetti (2002–2013)
- (Serbia) Nenad Lalović (2013–present)

== National Federations ==
Over 150 Nations.

== Commissions ==
1. Athletes
2. Coaches
3. Development
4. GEDI
5. Hall of Fame
6. Legacy & Sustainability
7. Legal & Ethics
8. Marketing
9. Media - UWW Doctor Forms & Documents
10. Refereeing
11. School & University Sports
12. Scientific
13. Sports for All
14. Technical
15. Wrestling Friends

== Councils ==
African Council

Asian Council

European Council

Oceania Council

Pan American Council

== Committees ==
Traditional Wrestling Committee

Beach Wrestling Committee

World Belt Wrestling Committee

Grappling & Pankration Committee (GP/PK/MMA)

African Wrestling Committee

Mediterranean Committee of Associated Wrestling Styles

Commonwealth Wrestling Committee

French Union of Wrestling Federations

== Events, activities, and honors ==
Former FILA logo

UWW is the body responsible for supervising Olympic wrestling, and so competitions for freestyle and Greco-Roman wrestling take place every Summer Olympiad.

Besides the Summer Olympics, there are also various international competitions such as the Commonwealth Games, the Pan-American Games, etc. that have wrestling as an official sport. Also, the Continental Championships and Continental Cups usually take place annual and are regulated by each Continental Committee. Then, there are World Championships that usually take place among the various nations every year (for the senior age category, every year except the year the Summer Olympics are held), and many international tournaments that take place between countries and among wrestlers of the same country (such as the United States nationals in freestyle and Greco-Roman).

These tournaments encompass a wide variety of age categories and also both sexes, but can also take place separately for each sex or for each age category (schoolboys or schoolgirls, cadets, juniors, and seniors).

UWW also sponsors training for athletes in the various wrestling styles at training centers, currently located in Finland, France, Italy, Japan, Spain, Turkey, and the United States. The International Wrestling Hall of Fame, located in Stillwater, Oklahoma awards individuals with honors in Greco-Roman wrestling, freestyle wrestling, women's wrestling, and officiating.

== Organization and governance ==
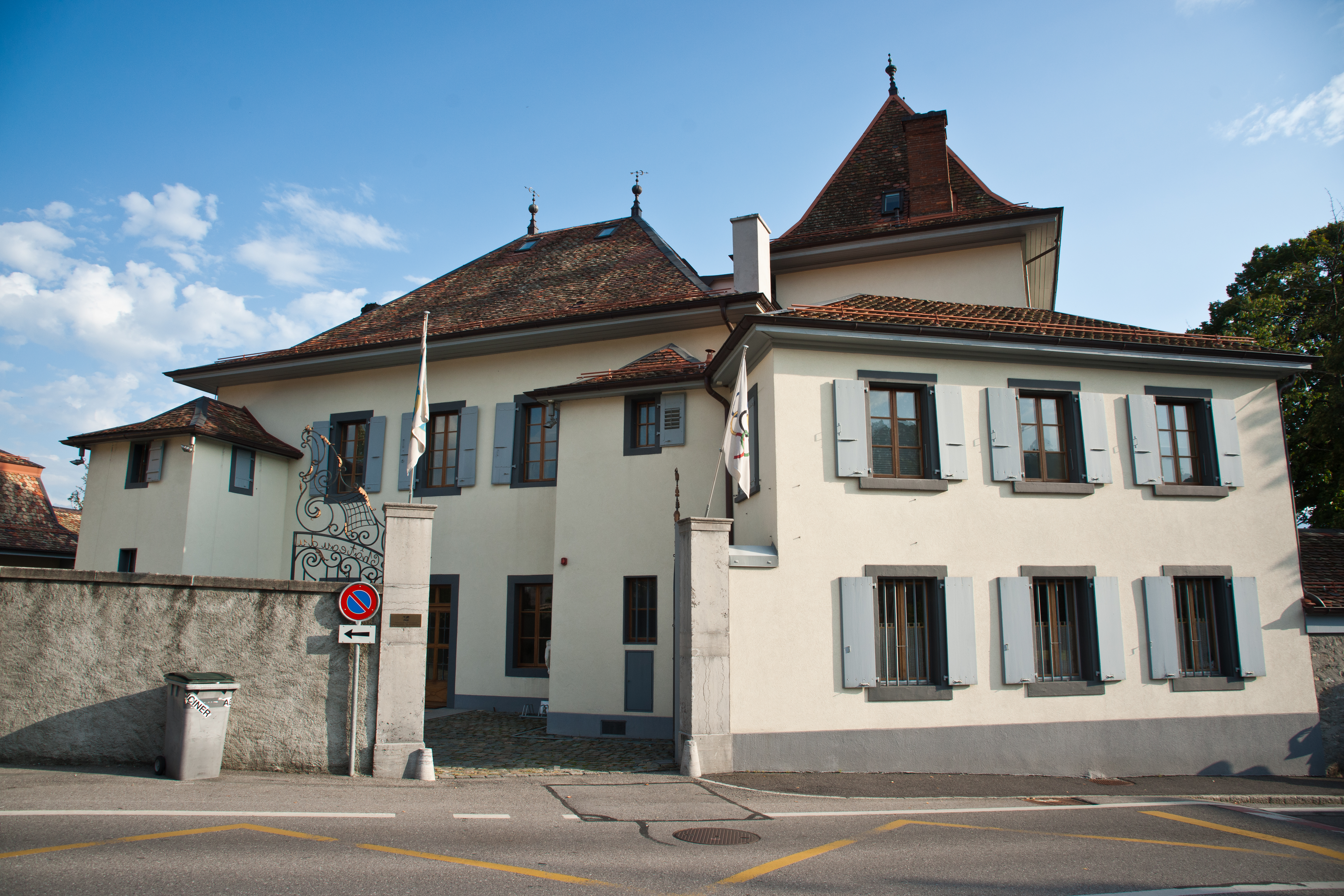
UWW, Corsier-sur-Vevey.

UWW is now based in Corsier-sur-Vevey, outside of Lausanne, Switzerland. The official languages are English and French. UWW is governed by a congress made up of representatives from each of the 176 national wrestling federations (the nation's governing body for wrestling). National federations that at least govern the two Olympic wrestling styles are admitted as affiliate members. Those national federations that exclusively govern traditional wrestling and other styles can be admitted as associated members. Up to three representatives from each federation may attend the conference, and only one may vote. The congress meets at least every two years, usually during the Olympic Games or during the World Championships that meet between Olympic Games. The UWW Congress in turn elects members of the UWW Bureau and the UWW President.

The bureau serves as the directing and administrating body of UWW. The UWW Bureau is composed of the president, four vice presidents, the secretary general, 12 other elected members (with two seats reserved for women), the presidents of the five Continental Committees, and an honorary president who advises but has no vote (currently, Milan Ercegan). Honorary members are also in turn elected to the bureau but do not vote. The president, the vice presidents, and the secretary general make up the executive committee. Each of the members represents themselves personally and has an individual vote in the Congress. No two members represent the same nationality (exceptions may be made for the president, the two female members, the Continental Committee presidents, and the honorary president).

The UWW president manages the day-to-day affairs of the organization. The president represents UWW at international meetings, before the International Olympic Committee, and before the general public. The current interim president of UWW is Nenad Lalović from Serbia who has served in that role since 2013. Bureau members and the president serve for six-year terms and can be reelected. Usually one third of the Bureau members are up for reelection every two years.

A secretary general is chosen by the Bureau for six years and is the secondary director of UWW behind the president, serves as secretary of both the Bureau and the Congress, and maintains healthy communication between the national federations, the Continental Committees, the Commissions, and all the departments of UWW. The current Secretary General is Michel Dusson from France. There are also auxiliary bodies of UWW. One group of auxiliary bodies is the Continental Committee, made up of each of the national federations on each continent (currently Africa, Asia, the Americas, Europe, and Oceania). The Continental Committees are directed by an executive bureau composed of a president, vice president, and three other members who all serve for a term of four years. Continental Committees meet at least every two years in the year following the Summer Olympics, in which there is usually the Continental Championship.

Other auxiliary bodies include commissions, which are made of a president, vice president, secretary, and four other members who all serve for four years. Commissions include those dealing with technical issues; officiating; medical safety and anti-doping; promotion; and for athletes. The members of the commissions are nominated and financially supported by the national federations that they originate from and are generally specialists in the field that the commission supervises.

== Controversies ==
=== Biased refereeing ===
Pelle Svensson, a former two-time world champion (Greco-Roman 100 kg class) and member of board of FILA from 1990 to 2007, has described FILA as an inherently corrupt organization. During the 2004 Summer Olympics in Athens, Svensson served as chairman of the disciplinary committee of FILA. As he was watching the final in the men's Greco-Roman wrestling 84 kg class between Alexei Michine from Russia and Ara Abrahamian from Sweden, Svensson witnessed how the Russian team leader Mikhail Mamiashvili and 1988 Soviet Olympic gold medalist was giving signs to the referee. When Svensson approached him and informed him that this was not allowed according to the rules, Mamiashvili responded by saying "you should know that this may lead to your death." Svensson later found proof that the Romanian referee was bribed (according to Svensson the referee had received over one million Swedish krona).

Svensson also spoke out in support of the allegations of corruption during the semifinals in the men's Greco-Roman wrestling 84 kg at the 2008 Summer Olympics in Beijing, when (again) Ara Abrahamian lost against Andrea Minguzzi from Italy (who later won a gold medal in the event) after a controversial ruling by the referee. It was later reported that the referee of the match, Jean-Marc Petoud from Switzerland, is a first cousin of FILA president Raphaël Martinetti. Abrahamian, who was stripped of his bronze medal in the 2008 Beijing Summer Olympics after dropping the medal in protest, received a level of vindication through the Court of Arbitration for Sport (CAS). His protest revolved around a second round bout with Minguzzi where a penalty was not assessed until after the round had concluded. Abrahamian's coach was denied a chance to review the call via video, and FILA also refused an official protest from the coach.

CAS ruled in favor of Abrahamian that in future Olympic matches FILA must have an appeals process that affirms the Olympic Charter in addition to FILA's own rules concerning fair play: "FILA is required by the Olympic Charter and its own internal rules, to provide a procedure in its rules for an appeal jury (or some equivalent) to hear promptly claims by athletes or others affected that in a competition the relevant officials have not complied with FILA rules and procedures. Article 22 of its Wrestling Rules may provide such a procedure. If so, FILA should clarify that mechanism. In any event, FILA did not follow Article 22 properly, if at all, or provide any other appropriate appeal mechanism in this case. The Athlete is also entitled to invoke the disciplinary process contemplated by Article 36 of the Constitution."

In their ruling, the CAS judges specifically noted the absence of FILA officials at the Abrahamian hearing: "On 21 August 2008, FILA corresponded with the CAS and indicated it was unavailable to attend the hearing at the proposed time and date. In order to allow the attendance of FILA's officials at the hearing, the Panel offered a different time that would be suitable to all parties. FILA repeated that it would not attend the hearing."

=== Inclusion in the Olympics ===
Because of growing costs, the International Olympic Committee (IOC) has been under pressure to reduce the number of events and the number of athletes in each summer game. The IOC has adopted a system where "core sports" would continue indefinitely in future Olympics, but "non-core" sports would be selected for inclusion on an Olympic game-by-game basis. Wrestling was one of the 26 core sports. However, following the 2012 London Olympics, the IOC's executive committee conducted a study of the 26 core sports in terms of their success at the London Olympics as well as worldwide grassroots support. The study sought to trim one core sport so that starting with the 2020 Olympics, only 25 core sports would continue. On 12 February 2013, the IOC Executive Board voted to recommend that wrestling be dropped as a core sport. FILA responded with a statement the same day:

FILA was greatly astonished by today's recommendation of the IOC Executive Board not to maintain wrestling among the 25 core sports for the 2020 Olympic Games. FILA will take all necessary measures to convince the IOC Executive Board and IOC members of the aberration of such decision against one of the founding sports of the ancient and modern Olympic Games.

On 15 February, FILA held an emergency meeting and its president, Raphaël Martinetti, asked for a vote of confidence. When only 50% of his Board voted to support him, he resigned as FILA President. Although wrestlers would be able to continue to compete in the World Games, United States wrestlers expressed grave disappointment at the possibility that they could be excluded from future Olympics. Subsequently, wrestling had to compete with seven other non-core sports – baseball/softball, squash, karate, sport climbing, wakeboarding, wushu and roller sports – for a place in the 2020 Games. On 8 September 2013 the IOC voted to restore wrestling as an Olympic sport for 2020.

=== Biased visa enforcement ===
In March 2019, the UWW recommended that its national federations end discussions or relations with the Wrestling Federation of India in the wake of visa denials to Pakistani shooting sportspersons. In October 2022, the Spanish embassy in New Delhi arbitrarily denied visas to 21 female and male Indian wrestlers, preventing them from participating in the U23 World Championships in Pontevedra. Denials included the U20 gold medallist Antim Panghal. As of October 17, 2022, the UWW has not made any statements or recommendations about the situation.

== Hall of Fame ==
The UWW International Wrestling Hall of Fame is located in the National Wrestling Hall of Fame and Museum. It contains a Hall of Honors and the Hall of Fame.

== See also ==
- Wrestling World Cup
- World Wrestling Championships
- World Wrestling Clubs Cup
- World Beach Wrestling Championships
- List of World Championships medalists in wrestling (freestyle)
- List of World Championships medalists in wrestling (Greco-Roman)
- List of World Championships medalists in wrestling (women)
- List of World and Olympic Champions in Greco-Roman wrestling
- List of World and Olympic Champions in men's freestyle wrestling
