= UFC Fight Night: Edgar vs. Swanson =

UFC mixed martial arts event in 2014

- The poster for UFC Fight Night: Edgar vs. Swanson
- Promotion: Ultimate Fighting Championship
- Date: November 22, 2014
- Venue: Frank Erwin Center
- City: Austin, Texas
- Attendance: 10,131
- Total gate: $670,022

Event chronology
UFC 180: Werdum vs. Hunt	UFC Fight Night: Edgar vs. Swanson	UFC 181: Hendricks vs. Lawler II

UFC Fight Night: Edgar vs. Swanson (also known as UFC Fight Night 57) was a mixed martial arts event held at the Frank Erwin Center in Austin, Texas, on November 22, 2014.

== Background ==
The event was the second that the organization had hosted in Austin, following UFC Fight Night 22 in 2010.

The card was headlined by a featherweight bout between former UFC Lightweight Champion Frankie Edgar and Cub Swanson.

A bout between Paige VanZant and Kailin Curran, briefly linked to UFC Fight Night: MacDonald vs. Saffiedine, was rescheduled after VanZant suffered a minor injury and took place at this event.

== Results ==
Main Card (Fox Sports 1)
Weight class				Method	Round	Time	Notes
Featherweight	Frankie Edgar	def.	Cub Swanson	Submission (neck crank)	5	4:56
Lightweight	Edson Barboza	def.	Bobby Green	Decision (unanimous) (30–27, 30–27, 30–27)	3	5:00
Flyweight	Chico Camus	def.	Brad Pickett	Decision (split) (29–28, 27–30, 29–28)	3	5:00
Heavyweight	Alexey Oleynik	def.	Jared Rosholt	KO (punches)	1	3:21
Flyweight	Joseph Benavidez	def.	Dustin Ortiz	Decision (unanimous) (30–27, 30–27, 30–27)	3	5:00
Lightweight	Matt Wiman	def.	Isaac Vallie-Flagg	Decision (unanimous) (29–28, 30–27, 30–27)	3	5:00
Preliminary card (Fox Sports 1)
Heavyweight	Ruslan Magomedov	def.	Josh Copeland	Decision (unanimous) (29–28, 30–27, 30–27)	3	5:00
Middleweight	Roger Narvaez	def.	Luke Barnatt	Decision (split) (29–28, 28–29, 29–28)	3	5:00
Lightweight	James Vick	def.	Nick Hein	Decision (unanimous) (30–27, 29–28, 29–28)	3	5:00
Lightweight	Akbarh Arreola	def.	Yves Edwards	Submission (armbar)	1	1:52
Preliminary card (UFC Fight Pass)
Women's Strawweight	Paige VanZant	def.	Kailin Curran	TKO (punches)	3	2:54
Featherweight	Choi Doo-ho	def.	Juan Puig	TKO (punches)	1	0:18

== Bonus awards ==
The following fighters were awarded $50,000 bonuses:

- Fight of the Night: Paige VanZant vs. Kailin Curran
- Performance of the Night: Frankie Edgar and Aleksei Oleinik

== See also ==
- List of UFC events
- 2014 in UFC
