= Kevin Souza =

Brazilian martial artist (born 1984)

- Born: Edimilson dos Santos Souza; October 17, 1984 (age 42); Salvador, Bahia, Brazil
- Height: 6 ft 0 in (183 cm)
- Weight: 145 lb (66 kg; 10 st 5 lb)
- Division: Featherweight; Lightweight
- Reach: 74 in (188 cm)
- Style: Boxing
- Fighting out of: Florianópolis, Santa Catarina, Brazil
- Team: DS Team; CM System
- Years active: 2009–present

Mixed martial arts record
- Total: 25
- Wins: 18
- By knockout: 15
- By submission: 1
- By decision: 2
- Losses: 7
- By knockout: 2
- By submission: 4
- By decision: 1

Other information
- Mixed martial arts record from Sherdog

Edimilson Souza (born October 17, 1984), professionally known as Kevin Souza, is a Brazilian mixed martial artist who competed in the featherweight division of the Ultimate Fighting Championship. A professional MMA competitor since 2009, Kevin made a name for himself fighting all over his home country of Brazil. He is a former Jungle Fight Featherweight Champion.

== Mixed martial arts career ==
=== Ultimate Fighting Championship ===
After three successful Jungle Fight Featherweight Championship title defenses in Brazil, Kevin Souza replaced Sam Sicilia and was scheduled to make his UFC debut against Felipe Arantes on September 4, 2013, at UFC Fight Night 28. He won the fight via split decision.

He later faced Mark Eddiva on May 31, 2014, at The Ultimate Fighter Brazil 3 Finale. Kevin won the fight via TKO due to punches with only eight seconds left for the end of the second round and received a Fight of the Night bonus as well.

Souza faced Katsunori Kikuno on March 21, 2015 at UFC Fight Night 62. He won the fight by knockout in the first round.

Souza faced Chas Skelly on November 7, 2015 at UFC Fight Night 77. Despite hurting Skelly a number of times with punches, Souza lost the fight via submission in the second round and was subsequently released from the promotion.

=== Bellator ===
It was announced that Souza had signed with Bellator MMA, he is replaced the injured Derek Campos at Bellator 152 against Patricky Freire on just four days notice on April 16, 2016. Souza lost the fight via unanimous decision (30-27,30-27,30-27)

== Titles and accomplishments ==
=== Mixed martial arts ===
- Ultimate Fighting Championship
  - Fight of the Night (One time) vs Mark Eddiva
  - Performance of the Night (One time) vs Katsunori Kikuno
- Jungle Fight
  - Jungle Fight Featherweight Championship (One Time)
    - Three successful title defenses

== Mixed martial arts record ==
Professional record breakdown
25 matches	18 wins	7 losses
By knockout	15	2
By submission	1	4
By decision	2	1

Res.	Record	Opponent	Method	Event	Date	Round	Time	Location	Notes
Loss	18–7	Predrag Bogdanović	TKO (leg injury)	Serbian Battle Championship 44	September 9, 2022	1	3:13	Belgrade, Serbia	Catchweight (165 lb) bout.
Loss	18–6	Heinrich Caceres	KO (head kick)	CTF 3	December 19, 2020	1	3:15	Asunción, Paraguay	Return to Lightweight. For the CTF Lightweight Championship.
Win	18–5	Denis Silva	Decision (split)	Future FC 6	June 28, 2019	3	5:00	São Paulo, Brazil	
Win	17–5	Janio Carvalho	TKO (punches)	MF Fighters 1	November 10, 2018	1	0:08	São José do Rio Preto, Brazil	
Loss	16–5	Patricky Freire	Decision (unanimous)	Bellator 152	April 16, 2016	3	5:00	Turin, Italy	Lightweight bout.
Loss	16–4	Chas Skelly	Submission (rear-naked choke)	UFC Fight Night: Belfort vs. Henderson 3	November 7, 2015	2	1:56	São Paulo, Brazil	
Win	16–3	Katsunori Kikuno	KO (punch)	UFC Fight Night: Maia vs. LaFlare	March 21, 2015	1	1:31	Rio de Janeiro, Brazil	Performance of the Night.
Win	15–3	Mark Eddiva	TKO (punches)	The Ultimate Fighter Brazil 3 Finale: Miocic vs. Maldonado	May 31, 2014	2	4:52	São Paulo, Brazil	Fight of the Night.
Win	14–3	Felipe Arantes	Decision (split)	UFC Fight Night: Teixeira vs. Bader	September 4, 2013	3	5:00	Belo Horizonte, Brazil	
Win	13–3	Fabiano Nogueira	KO (punch)	Jungle Fight 51	April 26, 2013	1	4:47	Rio de Janeiro, Brazil	Defended the Jungle Fight Featherweight Championship.
Win	12–3	João Antonio Gois	TKO (punches)	Tavares Combat 2	January 24, 2013	1	1:19	Itajaí, Brazil	
Win	11–3	Mauro Chaulet	KO (punch)	Jungle Fight 47	December 21, 2012	1	3:03	Porto Alegre, Brazil	Defended the Jungle Fight Featherweight Championship.
Win	10–3	Henrique Gomes	TKO (retirement)	Jungle Fight 42	August 18, 2012	2	3:30	São Paulo, Brazil	Defended the Jungle Fight Featherweight Championship.
Win	9–3	Fabiano Nogueira	TKO (punches)	Jungle Fight 39	May 12, 2012	1	2:18	Rio de Janeiro, Brazil	Won the Jungle Fight Featherweight Championship.
Win	8–3	Felipe Cruz	KO (knee)	Floripa Fight 8	March 10, 2012	3	1:14	Florianópolis, Brazil	
Win	7–3	Geison Costa	TKO (punches)	São José Super Fight 1	October 1, 2011	1	0:20	São José, Brazil	
Loss	6–3	José Ivanildo	Submission (guillotine choke)	Nitrix Champion Fight 7	June 4, 2011	1	3:40	Balneário Camboriú, Brazil	
Loss	6–2	Claudinei Maia	Submission (rear-naked choke)	Centurion Mixed Martial Arts	January 15, 2011	2	3:41	Balneário Camboriú, Brazil	
Win	6–1	Daniel Mota	Submission (guillotine choke)	Sul Fight Championship 4	November 20, 2010	1		Florianópolis, Brazil	
Win	5–1	Renato Gomes	TKO (punches)	Black Trunk Fight 1	August 14, 2010	1		Florianópolis, Brazil	
Win	4–1	Sebastian Vidal	TKO (body punch)	Floripa Fight 6	March 20, 2010	2		Florianópolis, Brazil	
Win	3–1	Sebastian Vidal	KO (punches)	Warrior's Challenge 4	December 30, 2009	1		Porto Belo, Brazil	
Win	2–1	John Paine	TKO (punches)	Argentina Fighting Championships	December 27, 2009	1	1:14	Buenos Aires, Argentina	
Loss	1–1	Marcos Vinicius	Submission (rear-naked choke)	Samurai FC 2: Warrior's Return	December 12, 2009	1	1:26	Curitiba, Brazil	
Win	1–0	Rodrigo Flecha	KO (punch)	VIP - Stage 4	October 24, 2009	1	0:15	Joinville, Brazil	

== See also ==
- List of current UFC fighters
- List of male mixed martial artists
