= UFC Fight Night: Henderson vs. Khabilov =

UFC mixed martial arts event in 2014

- The poster for UFC Fight Night: Henderson vs. Khabilov
- Promotion: Ultimate Fighting Championship
- Date: June 7, 2014
- Venue: Tingley Coliseum
- City: Albuquerque, New Mexico
- Attendance: 8,775
- Total gate: $697,901

Event chronology
The Ultimate Fighter Brazil 3 Finale: Miocic vs. Maldonado	UFC Fight Night: Henderson vs. Khabilov	UFC 174: Johnson vs. Bagautinov

UFC Fight Night: Henderson vs. Khabilov (also known as UFC Fight Night 42) was a mixed martial arts event held on June 7, 2014, at Tingley Coliseum in Albuquerque, New Mexico.

== Background ==
The event was the first that the organization hosted in New Mexico. Zuffa previously hosted a World Extreme Cagefighting event WEC 32 in nearby Rio Rancho back in 2008.

A lightweight bout between former WEC and UFC Lightweight Champion Benson Henderson and Rustam Khabilov served as the event headliner.

A fight between John Dodson and John Moraga also took place on the card, the two had previously met back in 2010 at Nemesis Fighting: MMA Global Invasion

Jon Tuck was briefly scheduled to face Yosdenis Cedeno. However, Cedeno pulled out of the bout citing an injury and was replaced by promotional newcomer Jake Lindsey.

Patrick Cummins was expected to face Francimar Barroso at this event. However, Barroso was forced to pull out due to injury and was replaced by UFC promotional newcomer Roger Narvaez.

== Results ==
Main Card (Fox Sports 1)
Weight class				Method	Round	Time	Notes
Lightweight	Benson Henderson	def.	Rustam Khabilov	Submission (rear-naked choke)	4	1:16
Lightweight	Diego Sanchez	def.	Ross Pearson	Decision (split) (27–30, 30–27, 29–28)	3	5:00
Flyweight	John Dodson	def.	John Moraga	TKO (doctor stoppage)	2	5:00
Lightweight	Rafael dos Anjos	def.	Jason High	TKO (punches)	2	3:36
Lightweight	Piotr Hallmann	def.	Yves Edwards	Submission (rear-naked choke)	3	2:31
Bantamweight	Bryan Caraway	def.	Erik Pérez	Submission (rear-naked choke)	2	1:52
Preliminary card (Fox Sports 1)
Bantamweight	Sergio Pettis	def.	Yaotzin Meza	Decision (unanimous) (29–28, 29–28, 29–28)	3	5:00
Welterweight	Lance Benoist	def.	Bobby Voelker	Decision (unanimous) (29–28, 29–28, 30–27)	3	5:00
Flyweight	Scott Jorgensen	def.	Danny Martinez	Decision (unanimous) (29–28, 29–28, 30–27)	3	5:00
Lightweight	Jon Tuck	def.	Jake Lindsey	Submission (heel strikes to the body)	3	2:47
Preliminary card (UFC Fight Pass)
Light Heavyweight	Patrick Cummins	def.	Roger Narvaez	TKO (punches)	2	2:28

== Bonus awards ==
The following fighters received $50,000 bonuses:

- Fight of the Night: Scott Jorgensen vs. Danny Martinez
- Performance of the Night: Benson Henderson and Piotr Hallmann

== Reported payout ==
The following is the reported payout to the fighters as reported to the New Mexico State Athletic Commission. It does not include sponsor money and also does not include the UFC's traditional "fight night" bonuses.

- Benson Henderson: $90,000 (includes $45,000 win bonus) def. Rustam Khabilov: $17,000
- Diego Sanchez: $140,000 (includes $70,000 win bonus) def. Ross Pearson: $30,000 ^
- John Dodson: $40,000 (includes $20,000 win bonus) def. John Moraga: $19,000
- Rafael dos Anjos: $64,000 (includes $32,000 win bonus) def. Jason High: $19,000
- Piotr Hallman: $20,000 (includes $10,000 win bonus) def. Yves Edwards: $24,000
- Bryan Caraway: $20,000 (includes $10,000 win bonus) def. Érik Pérez: $21,000
- Sergio Pettis: $20,000 (includes $10,000 win bonus) def. Yaotzin Meza: $14,000
- Lance Benoist: $20,000 (includes $10,000 win bonus) def. Bobby Voelker: $12,000
- Scott Jorgensen: $52,000 (includes $26,000 win bonus) def. Danny Martinez: $8,000
- Jon Tuck: $16,000 (includes $8,000 win bonus) def. Jake Lindsey: $8,000
- Patrick Cummins: $16,000 (includes $8,000 win bonus) def. Roger Narvaez: $8,000

^Although not reflected in the New Mexico Athletic Commission paperwork, both Sanchez and Pearson received win bonuses.

== See also ==
- List of UFC events
- 2014 in UFC
