= Roger Narvaez =

American mixed martial artist (born 1983)

- Born: September 9, 1983 (age 43); Corpus Christi, Texas, United States
- Other names: Silverback
- Nationality: American
- Height: 6 ft 3 in (1.91 m)
- Weight: 185 lb (84 kg; 13 st 3 lb)
- Division: Middleweight
- Reach: 79.0 in (201 cm)
- Style: Boxing, Brazilian Jiu-Jitsu
- Fighting out of: Corpus Christi, Texas, United States
- Team: Full Contact Fight Academy; Paragon BJJ
- Years active: 2011-present

Mixed martial arts record
- Total: 12
- Wins: 8
- By knockout: 4
- By submission: 2
- By decision: 2
- Losses: 4
- By knockout: 3
- By decision: 1

Other information
- Mixed martial arts record from Sherdog

Roger Narvaez (born September 9, 1983) is an American mixed martial artist who competes in the middleweight division.

== Mixed martial arts career ==
Narvaez began training in Brazilian jiu-jitsu in 2007 as a way to lose weight and to help keep in shape for his job as a firefighter. He began training in mixed martial arts in 2009, making his professional debut in 2011. Narvaez competed primarily in regional promotions across his native state of Texas where he compiled a record of 6 - 0 before signing with the UFC in the spring of 2014.

=== Ultimate Fighting Championship ===
Narvaez made his promotional debut as a short notice replacement in a light heavyweight bout against Patrick Cummins on June 7, 2014 at UFC Fight Night 42, replacing an injured Francimar Barroso. Cummins won the fight via second round TKO.

Narvaez faced Luke Barnatt on November 22, 2014 at UFC Fight Night 57. After a very even first two rounds, Narvaez had a huge third round, wobbling Barnatt with a head kick and then dropping him with a right hook. On the ground, Barnatt was able to survive several submission attempts. Narvaez won the bout via split decision.

Narvaez faced Elias Theodorou on March 14, 2015 at UFC 185. After a first round in which Narvaez seemed to control, Narvaez suffered a broken arm in the second round after an attempt to block a kick from Theodorou, and was stopped with a flurry of punches shortly thereafter. In turn, Narvaez was released from the promotion.

== Professional grappling career ==
Narvaez was booked to compete against Dan Manasoiu in the main event of Submission Hunter Pro 81 on January 22, 2023. Narvaez lost the match by submission, a rear-naked choke.

Narvaez will compete against Nonso Ebede in a superfight at Submission Hunter Pro 87 on October 15, 2023.

== Championships and accomplishments ==
- Ultimate Fighting Championship
  - UFC.com Awards
    - 2014: Ranked #10 Upset of the Year vs. Luke Barnatt

== Mixed martial arts record ==
Professional record breakdown
12 matches	8 wins	4 losses
By knockout	4	3
By submission	2	0
By decision	2	1

Res.	Record	Opponent	Method	Event	Date	Round	Time	Location	Notes
Loss	8-4	Ike Villanueva	KO	Fury FC 36	August 30, 2019	1	0:28	Robstown, Texas, United States	
Loss	8-3	Antonio Jones	Decision (unanimous)	Fury FC 17	June 10, 2017	5	5:00	San Antonio, Texas, United States	
Win	8–2	Juan Torres	TKO (punches)	Fury FC 14	November 19, 2016	2	3:56	San Antonio, Texas, United States	
Loss	7–2	Elias Theodorou	TKO (punches)	UFC 185	March 14, 2015	2	4:07	Dallas, Texas, United States	
Win	7–1	Luke Barnatt	Decision (split)	UFC Fight Night: Edgar vs. Swanson	November 22, 2014	3	5:00	Austin, Texas, United States	
Loss	6–1	Patrick Cummins	TKO (punches)	UFC Fight Night: Henderson vs. Khabilov	June 7, 2014	2	2:28	Albuquerque, New Mexico, United States	Light Heavyweight bout.
Win	6–0	Hayward Charles	Decision (split)	Legacy Fighting Championship 23	September 13, 2013	3	5:00	San Antonio, Texas, United States	
Win	5–0	Matt Jones	TKO (punches)	XCP - Rocks Extreme	March 23, 2013	1	2:45	Corpus Christi, Texas, United States	
Win	4–0	Aaron Glynn	Submission (rear-naked choke)	XCP - Blood & Glory	August 25, 2012	1	2:59	Robstown, Texas, United States	
Win	3–0	Larry Hopkins	Submission (armbar)	UFP - Tournament of Warriors	June 30, 2012	1	2:39	Corpus Christi, Texas, United States	
Win	2–0	Andrew Garza	TKO (punches)	STFC 19	March 2, 2012	2	2:56	McAllen, Texas, United States	
Win	1–0	Julio Villareal	TKO (punches)	STFC 17	October 15, 2011	1	1:39	Padre Island, Texas, United States	

== See also ==
- List of male mixed martial artists
