= Emil Weber Meek =

Norwegian mixed martial arts fighter

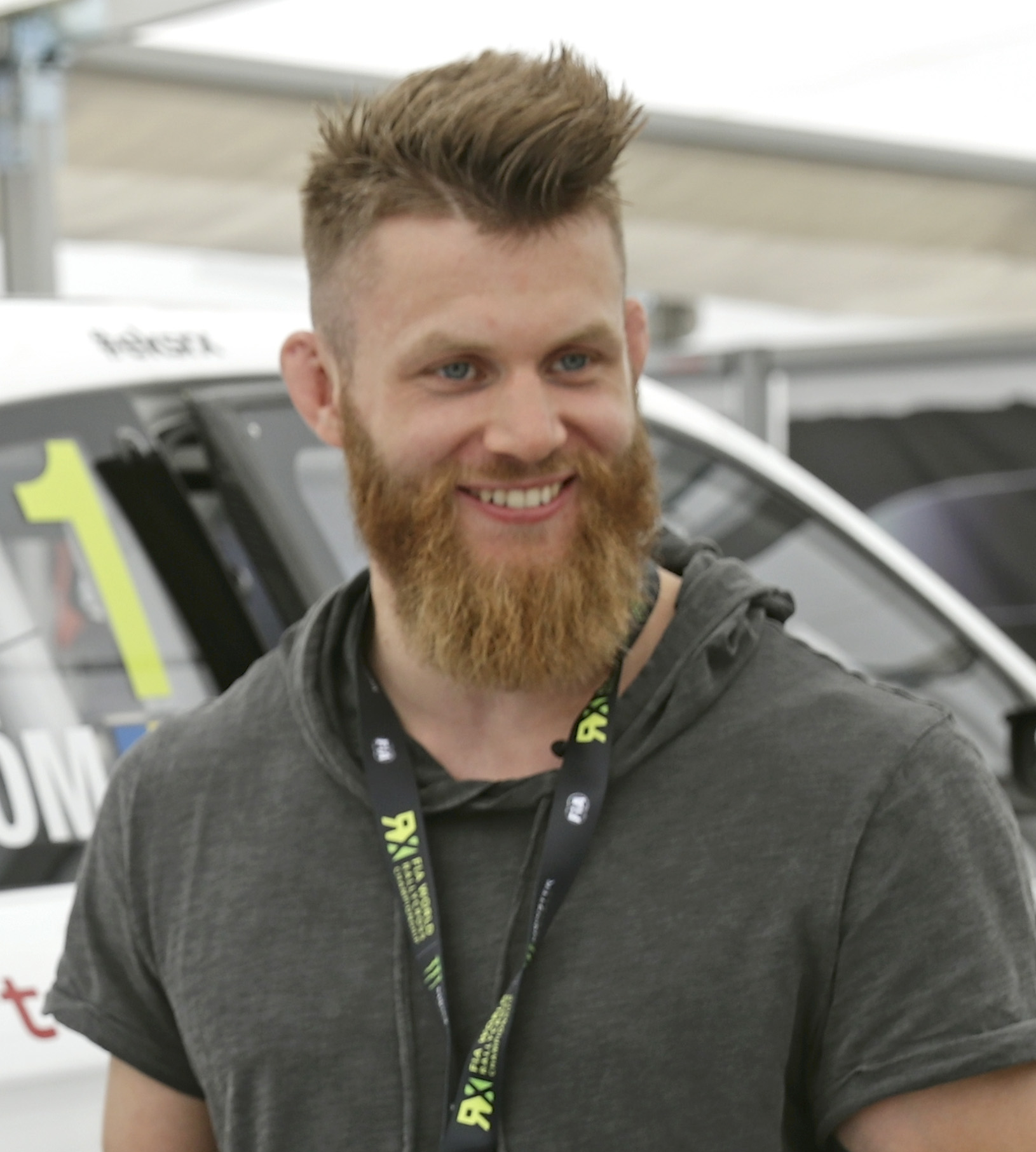
- Meek at the 2017 World RX of Norway
- Born: Emil Weber Meek; August 20, 1988 (age 38); Tønsberg, Norway
- Other names: Valhalla
- Height: 5 ft 11 in (1.80 m)
- Weight: 170 lb (77 kg; 12 st)
- Division: Welterweight
- Reach: 74 1/2 in (189 cm)
- Stance: Orthodox
- Fighting out of: Trondheim, Norway
- Team: MMA Trondheim
- Years active: 2012–2022

Mixed martial arts record
- Total: 17
- Wins: 10
- By knockout: 8
- By submission: 1
- By decision: 1
- Losses: 6
- By knockout: 2
- By submission: 1
- By decision: 3
- No contests: 1

Amateur record
- Total: 6
- Wins: 6
- Losses: 0

Other information
- Mixed martial arts record from Sherdog

Emil Weber Meek (born August 20, 1988) is a Norwegian retired professional mixed martial artist who competed in the welterweight division. He previously fought in the UFC and Konfrontacja Sztuk Walki (KSW).

== Background ==
Meek grew up in Nesna Municipality in Nordland county, and later lived in Mosjøen, Trondheim, and Oslo. In 2009, Meek started his mixed martial arts (MMA) career at the now defunct, Trondheim Fight Gym. Emil Meek runs MMA Trondheim together with Thomas Formo.

== Mixed martial arts career ==
Meek began his MMA career as an amateur, where he compiled an undefeated record (6–0).

Meek made his professional debut on March 12, 2011, against Magnus Frekman. Meek defeated Frekman via TKO 45 seconds into the first round. For his second fight, he fought Mohammed Abdallah. He lost the bout by TKO in the first round. After this loss, Meek went on a four-fight win streak. He was awarded 2013 Prospect of the Year by MMA Viking.

On August 20, 2016, he won the Venator Fighting Championship Welterweight title by defeating Rousimar Palhares by knockout in the first round. Meek stopped Palhares with a series of punches and elbows to the side of the head, while defending from Palhares' takedown attempt.

=== Ultimate Fighting Championship ===
On December 10, 2016, Meek made his promotional debut against returning veteran Jordan Mein at UFC 206. He won the fight via unanimous decision.

Meek was expected to face Nordine Taleb on May 28, 2017, at UFC Fight Night 109. However, Meek pulled out of the fight on May 12 citing injury. Meek was replaced by promotional newcomer Oliver Enkamp.

Meek was scheduled to faced Kamaru Usman on December 30, 2017, at UFC 219. However, the fight was rescheduled for January 14, 2018, at UFC Fight Night: Stephens vs. Choi. He lost the fight by unanimous decision.

Meek faced Bartosz Fabiński on July 22, 2018, at UFC Fight Night 134. He lost the fight via unanimous decision.

Meek faced Jake Matthews on February 23, 2020, at UFC Fight Night: Felder vs. Hooker. He lost the fight via unanimous decision.

On June 17, 2021, it was announced that Meek was released from the UFC.

=== Post-UFC career ===
After the release, Meek was scheduled to face Thibault Gouti at Ares FC 2 on December 11, 2021. Gouti pulled out of the bout and was replaced by Louis Glismann. He lost the fight via an armbar in round one.

Meek faced Kacper Koziorzębski on September 10, 2022, at KSW 74, winning the bout via ground and pound TKO in the second round.

On April 6, 2024, Meek announced that he was retiring from MMA.

== Championships and accomplishments ==
- Venator Fighting Championship
  - Venator Welterweight Championship (One time; former)
- Nordic MMA Awards: MMAViking.com
  - 2013 Prospect of the Year
  - 2016 Fighter of the Year
- Fight Matrix
  - 2016 Most Improved Fighter of the Year
  - 2016 Most Lopsided Upset of the Year vs. Rousimar Palhares at Venator FC 3

== Mixed martial arts record ==
Professional record breakdown
17 matches	10 wins	6 losses
By knockout	8	2
By submission	1	1
By decision	1	3
No contests	1	

Res.	Record	Opponent	Method	Event	Date	Round	Time	Location	Notes
Win	10–6 (1)	Kacper Koziorzębski	TKO (punches)	KSW 74	September 10, 2022	2	2:02	Ostrów Wielkopolski, Poland	
Loss	9–6 (1)	Louis Glismann	Submission (armbar)	Ares FC 2	December 11, 2021	1	1:00	Paris, France	
Loss	9–5 (1)	Jake Matthews	Decision (unanimous)	UFC Fight Night: Felder vs. Hooker	February 23, 2020	3	5:00	Auckland, New Zealand	
Loss	9–4 (1)	Bartosz Fabiński	Decision (unanimous)	UFC Fight Night: Shogun vs. Smith	July 22, 2018	3	5:00	Hamburg, Germany	
Loss	9–3 (1)	Kamaru Usman	Decision (unanimous)	UFC Fight Night: Stephens vs. Choi	January 14, 2018	3	5:00	St. Louis, Missouri, United States	
Win	9–2 (1)	Jordan Mein	Decision (unanimous)	UFC 206	December 10, 2016	3	5:00	Toronto, Ontario, Canada	
Win	8–2 (1)	Rousimar Palhares	KO (punches and elbows)	Venator FC 3	May 21, 2016	1	0:45	Milan, Italy	Won the inaugural Venator FC Welterweight Championship.
Win	7–2 (1)	Christophe Van Dijck	TKO (punches)	Battle of Botnia 2015	November 28, 2015	2	4:35	Umeå, Sweden	
Win	6–2 (1)	Kai Puolakka	Submission (guillotine choke)	Cage 32	October 23, 2015	3	2:20	Helsinki, Finland	
Loss	5–2 (1)	Albert Odzimkowski	TKO (punches)	Fight Exclusive Night 8	July 31, 2015	1	3:30	Kołobrzeg, Poland	
NC	5–1 (1)	Piotr Danielski	NC (overturned)	Berserkers Arena 7	May 14, 2015	3	5:00	Szczecin, Poland	Originally a majority decision win for Danielski; overturned due to referee mistake.
Win	5–1	Per Franklin	TKO (punch)	Superior Challenge 9	November 23, 2013	2	1:40	Goteborg, Sweden	
Win	4–1	Tato Primera	TKO (punches)	Strength and Honor 8	September 21, 2013	1	0:50	Geneva, Switzerland	
Win	3–1	Raymond Jarman	TKO (punches)	European MMA 5	April 19, 2013	1	N/A	Copenhagen, Denmark	
Win	2–1	Frodi Vitalis Hansen	TKO (punches)	European MMA 4	March 2, 2013	1	1:00	Viborg, Denmark	
Loss	1–1	Mohammed Abdallah	TKO (punches)	Fighter Gala 25	May 12, 2012	1	4:33	Frederiksberg, Denmark	
Win	1–0	Magnus Frekman	TKO (punches)	Red Mist Promotions: Ultimate Rage 1	March 12, 2011	1	0:25	Barnsley, England	Welterweight debut.
