= Milan Ercegan =

Yugoslav sports manager

5th President of FILA
- Incumbent
- Assumed office 1972–2002
- Preceded by: Roger Coulon
- Succeeded by: Raphaël Martinetti

Personal details
- Born: 18 April 1916
- Died: 11 January 2011 (aged 94)

Milan Ercegan (April 18, 1916 – January 11, 2011) was a Yugoslav sports manager, president of International wrestling federation (FILA) for 30 years (from 1972 to 2002) and Honorary President for life of FILA. He was replaced by Raphaël Martinetti in 2002.

== Biography ==
He had been Secretary General for 20 years under President Roger Coulon (FRA) before being elected as FILA President in 1972. After President Coulon's death in 1971, Secretary General Mr. Milan Ercegan was appointed temporary President and was elected FILA President through a voice vote during the congress in Munich in 1972. He notably published the first book for wrestling coaches (Theory and Practice of Wrestling) in 1973 and organised the following year the first coaches’ course in Dubrovnik. He also created the Advanced School for Coaches in 1974. During his 30 years of presidency, numerous works were published, notably the three major books from Bulgarian Professor Raïko Petrov: "Olympic Wrestling throughout the Millennia" (1993), "100 Years of Olympic Wrestling" (1997) and "The Roots of Wrestling" (2000). Further, he opened the door to Russian Sambo Wrestling in 1968 and managed a book written by Shozo SASAHARA (1972).

Ercegan opened some new perspectives to the promotion of wrestling. He more particularly started the "FILA Golden Plan" whose goal was to provide technical assistance for developing countries. At the end of his term in 2002, about a hundred wrestling mats and a considerable number of books, magazines, videos and other pedagogic tools were distributed for free to National Federations. He did the same with international and continental Sambo program.

He also introduced new competitions to the FILA calendar (notably the junior World Championships and cadet Continental Championships) and revolutionized the world of wrestling by admitting female wrestling as a full-fledged discipline within FILA and its National Federations.

He died on January 11, 2011, at the age of 95.

Preceded by Roger Coulon	President of the International Federation of Associated Wrestling Styles; 1972–2002	Succeeded by Raphaël Martinetti
