= Luke Barnatt =

British mixed martial artist (born 1988)

- Born: 13 April 1988 (age 38); Redbridge, London, England
- Other names: Bigslow
- Height: 6 ft 6 in (1.98 m)
- Weight: 185 lb (84 kg; 13.2 st)
- Division: Middleweight
- Reach: 80.0 in (203 cm)
- Fighting out of: Cambridge, England
- Team: LiliusBarnatt Martial Arts
- Rank: Purple belt in Brazilian Jiu-Jitsu; Yellow belt in Taekwondo
- Years active: 2011–present

Mixed martial arts record
- Total: 25
- Wins: 15
- By knockout: 9
- By submission: 4
- By decision: 2
- Losses: 10
- By knockout: 3
- By submission: 1
- By decision: 6

Other information
- Mixed martial arts record from Sherdog

Luke Barnatt (born 13 April 1988) is an English mixed martial artist who fought as a middleweight for the Ultimate Fighting Championship (UFC). He was a member of FX's The Ultimate Fighter: Team Jones vs. Team Sonnen, and has also competed for BAMMA, UCMMA, ACA and RXF. At 6' 6" Barnatt is one of the tallest fighters currently competing in his weight class. Barnatt received his nickname "Bigslow" from brothers John Maguire and Tommy Maguire, for his size and being slow in response to their jokes and insults.

== Background ==
Barnatt was born in Redbridge, London and moved to Islington at the age of one and then Chelmsford at the age of ten. At the age of 16, Barnatt would move to Peterborough. Barnatt began playing many sports from a young age, including basketball, cricket, and track and field. At the age of 15, Barnatt began training in Tae Kwon Do but only achieved the rank of yellow belt before giving it up. Later on, Barnatt was introduced to wrestling by professional mixed martial arts fighter Jack Mason at Tsunami Shooters MMA.

== Mixed martial arts career ==
=== The Ultimate Fighter ===
Barnatt had a record of 5-0 before being selected as a member of The Ultimate Fighter: Team Jones vs. Team Sonnen In January 2013. Barnatt defeated Nicholas Kohring by decision to qualify the TUF house. During the choosing of teams, he was the first pick of Chael Sonnen of Team Sonnen and the first pick overall.

Barnatt defeated Gilbert Smith, Jr. in the preliminary round via second-round knockout, but was eliminated in the quarter-finals by Dylan Andrews.

=== Ultimate Fighting Championship ===
Barnatt made his UFC debut against fellow Ultimate Fighter castmate Collin Hart on 13 April 2013 at The Ultimate Fighter 17 Finale and won the fight via unanimous decision.

Barnatt faced Andrew Craig on 26 October 2013 at UFC Fight Night: Machida vs. Munoz and won the fight via submission in the second round. The fight also earned Barnatt his first Fight of the Night bonus award.

Barnatt faced promotional newcomer Mats Nilsson at UFC Fight Night 37 and won the fight via TKO due to strikes in the first round.

Barnatt faced Sean Strickland on 31 May 2014 at UFC Fight Night 41 and lost the fight by a split decision. 11 out of 11 media outlets scored the bout for Barnatt.

Barnatt faced Roger Narvaez on 22 November 2014 at UFC Fight Night 57 and lost the fight via split decision.

Barnatt was expected to face Clint Hester on 4 April 2015 at UFC Fight Night 63. However, Hester pulled out of the fight in early March due to a broken foot. Subsequently, Barnatt was pulled from the card entirely in favor of a matchup with Mark Muñoz on 16 May 2015 at UFC Fight Night 66. He lost the fight by unanimous decision and was subsequently released from the promotion.

=== Post-UFC; Independent promotions ===
Barnatt fought for Italian promotion Venator FC against Mattia Schiavolin on 12 December 2015 at Venator FC 2 in a fight for the promotions middleweight championship. He took the title by winning the fight by submission due to a rear-naked choke in the fourth round.

He was expected to face Rafael Silva on 20 February 2016 at British Challenge MMA 14. However his opponent was later changes to be Charles Andrade. He won the fight by knockout after dropping his opponent to the canvas with a right hand, 11 seconds into round 3.

Barnatt was expected to defend his Venator middleweight championship against fellow UFC veteran Jason Miller on 21 May 2016 at Venator FC 3. However, Miller missed weight by an amount of 24 lbs, as a result of this Miller was removed from the matchup against Barnatt and replaced by Stefan Croitoru. Barnatt won the fight, and defended the title, by TKO in round 2.

He fought Cristian Mitrea, in a light heavyweight match-up, on 19 December 2016 at RXF 25: All Stars in Romania. After stunning his opponent by punches and knees up against the fence, Barnatt landed a head kick to earn the knockout victory, 3 minutes into the first round.

=== Absolute Championship Berkut ===
Barnatt faced Mamed Khalidov on 11 March 2017 at ACB 53. He lost the fight via knockout in the first round.

Luke fought Scott Askham on 23 September 2017 in the main event at ACB 70. He lost the fight by split decision and earned fight of the night bonus. He went 2-3 overall before the promotion changed names from ACB to ACA- Absolute Championship Akhmat and went 1-4 in his last 5 and retired in 2020.

== Championships and accomplishments ==
- Ultimate Fighting Championship
  - Fight of the Night (One time) vs. Andrew Craig
  - The Ultimate Fighter 17 Fight of the Season
- Venator FC
  - VFC Middleweight Championship (One time)
  - One successful title defense

== Mixed martial arts record ==
Professional record breakdown
25 matches	15 wins	10 losses
By knockout	9	3
By submission	4	1
By decision	2	6

Res.	Record	Opponent	Method	Event	Date	Round	Time	Location	Notes
Loss	15–10	Evgeniy Egemberdiev	KO (punch)	ACA 115	13 December 2020	1	3:46	Moscow, Russia	
Loss	15–9	Karol Celiński	Decision (unanimous)	ACA 109	20 August 2020	3	5:00	Łódź, Poland	
Loss	15–8	Cory Hendricks	Submission (rear-naked choke)	ACA 102	29 November 2019	2	4:16	Almaty, Kazakhstan	
Win	15–7	Karol Celiński	KO (punch)	ACA 96	8 June 2019	1	1:29	Łódź, Poland	
Loss	14–7	Jorge Gonzalez	KO (punch)	ACA 92	16 February 2019	1	3:05	Warsaw, Poland	
Loss	14–6	Karol Celiński	Decision (majority)	ACB 88	16 June 2018	3	5:00	Brisbane, Australia	
Win	14–5	Maxim Futin	TKO (punches and knees)	ACB 81	23 February 2018	2	3:27	Dubai, United Arab Emirates	
Loss	13–5	Scott Askham	Decision (split)	ACB 70	23 September 2017	3	5:00	Sheffield, England	Middleweight bout. Fight of the Night.
Win	13–4	Max Nunes	KO (punches)	ACB 63	1 July 2017	1	4:08	Gdańsk, Poland	
Loss	12–4	Mamed Khalidov	KO (punches)	ACB 54	11 March 2017	1	0:21	Manchester, England	Middleweight bout.
Win	12–3	Cristian Mitrea	TKO (knees and head kick)	Real Xtreme Fighting 25	19 December 2016	1	3:00	Ploiești, Romania	Light Heavyweight debut.
Win	11–3	Stefan Croitoru	TKO (knees and punches)	Venator FC 3	21 May 2016	2	2:32	Milan, Italy	Defended the Venator FC Middleweight Championship.
Win	10–3	Charles Andrade	KO (punch)	British Challenge MMA 14	20 February 2016	3	0:11	Colchester, England	
Win	9–3	Mattia Schiavolin	Submission (rear-naked choke)	Venator FC 2	12 December 2015	4	1:46	Rimini, Italy	Won the Venator FC Middleweight Championship.
Loss	8–3	Mark Muñoz	Decision (unanimous)	UFC Fight Night: Edgar vs. Faber	16 May 2015	3	5:00	Pasay, Philippines	
Loss	8–2	Roger Narvaez	Decision (split)	UFC Fight Night: Edgar vs. Swanson	22 November 2014	3	5:00	Austin, Texas, United States	
Loss	8–1	Sean Strickland	Decision (split)	UFC Fight Night: Munoz vs. Mousasi	31 May 2014	3	5:00	Berlin, Germany	
Win	8–0	Mats Nilsson	TKO (head kick and punches)	UFC Fight Night: Gustafsson vs. Manuwa	8 March 2014	1	4:24	London, England	
Win	7–0	Andrew Craig	Submission (rear-naked choke)	UFC Fight Night: Machida vs. Muñoz	26 October 2013	2	2:12	Manchester, England	Fight of the Night.
Win	6–0	Collin Hart	Decision (unanimous)	The Ultimate Fighter: Team Jones vs. Team Sonnen Finale	13 April 2013	3	5:00	Las Vegas, Nevada, United States	
Win	5–0	Matteo Piran	TKO (punches)	Ultimate Warrior Challenge 20	1 September 2012	1	4:17	Southend-on-Sea, England	
Win	4–0	Chris Harman	Submission (rear-naked choke)	Ultimate Challenge MMA 28	26 May 2012	1	3:43	London, England	Catchweight (199 lb) bout.
Win	3–0	Lee Johnson	Submission (rear-naked choke)	BAMMA 9	24 March 2012	1	2:36	Birmingham, England	
Win	2–0	Ben Callum	Decision (unanimous)	Ultimate Challenge MMA 26	4 February 2012	3	5:00	London, England	
Win	1–0	Chris Greig	TKO (punches)	Cage FC 11	24 September 2011	2	2:11	Brentwood, England	Middleweight debut.

=== Mixed martial arts exhibition record ===
Exhibition record breakdown		
3 matches	2 wins	1 loss
By knockout	1	1
By decision	1	0

Res.	Record	Opponent	Method	Event	Date	Round	Time	Location	Notes
Loss	2-1	Dylan Andrews	TKO (punches)	The Ultimate Fighter: Team Jones vs. Team Sonnen	26 March 2013 (airdate)	3	1:57	Las Vegas, Nevada, United States	The Ultimate Fighter: Team Jones vs. Team Sonnen Quarter-final round; Fight of the season
Win	2-0	Gilbert Smith	KO (flying knee)	The Ultimate Fighter: Team Jones vs. Team Sonnen	29 January 2013 (airdate)	2	3:14	Las Vegas, Nevada, United States	The Ultimate Fighter: Team Jones vs. Team Sonnen Preliminary round
Win	1–0	Nicholas Kohring	Decision (unanimous)	The Ultimate Fighter: Team Jones vs. Team Sonnen	22 January 2013 (airdate)	2	5:00	Las Vegas, Nevada, United States	The Ultimate Fighter: Team Jones vs. Team Sonnen Elimination round

== See also ==
- List of male mixed martial artists
