= Mark Eddiva =

Filipino mixed martial artist

- Born: February 16, 1986 (age 40); Baguio, Philippines
- Nationality: Filipino
- Height: 5 ft 8 in (1.73 m)
- Weight: 145 lb (66 kg; 10.4 st)
- Division: Featherweight
- Reach: 68.0 in (173 cm)
- Style: Sanshou
- Stance: Orthodox
- Fighting out of: Baguio, Philippines
- Team: Team Lakay
- Years active: 2006–2016

Mixed martial arts record
- Total: 9
- Wins: 6
- By knockout: 3
- By submission: 2
- By decision: 1
- Losses: 3
- By knockout: 1
- By submission: 1
- By decision: 1

Other information
- Mixed martial arts record from Sherdog

Mark Eddiva
Medal record

Representing Philippines

Men's Wushu

SEA Games
Gold medal – first place	2009 Vientiane	70 kg
Gold medal – first place	2011 Jakarta	70 kg

Asian Games
Bronze medal – third place	2010 Guangzhou	65 kg

World Championships
Bronze medal – third place	2011 Ankara	70kg

Mark Eddiva (born February 16, 1986) is a reputed former Filipino wushu Champion and former mixed martial artist who competed in the featherweight division. He is known for having competed in the Ultimate Fighting Championship (UFC). He is of Igorot descent.

== Mixed martial arts career ==
Eddiva made his professional debut in 2006 competing as a featherweight in regional promotions primarily in the Philippines. He compiled a record of 5–0, finishing all of his opponents before signing with the UFC in early 2014.

=== Ultimate Fighting Championship ===
Eddiva made his promotional debut against Jumabieke Tuerxun on March 1, 2014, at The Ultimate Fighter: China Finale. Eddiva controlled Tuerxun on the feet and on the ground en route to a unanimous decision.

Eddiva later faced Kevin Souza on May 31, 2014, at The Ultimate Fighter Brazil 3 Finale. Souza won the fight via TKO due to punches near the end of the second round. The back and forth action earned by participants Fight of the Night honors.

Eddiva was linked to a fight with Mike De La Torre on November 8, 2014, at UFC Fight Night 55. However, the pairing was cancelled after both fighters suffered injuries leading up to the event.

Eddiva was expected to face Alex White on May 16, 2015, at UFC Fight Night 66. However, on April 26, it was announced that White suffered an undisclosed injury and was forced out of the bout. White was replaced by promotional newcomer Levan Makashvili. Eddiva lost the fight via split decision.

Eddiva faced Dan Hooker on March 20, 2016, at UFC Fight Night 85. He lost the fight via submission in the first round and was subsequently released from the promotion.

== Championships and accomplishments ==
- Ultimate Fighting Championship
  - Fight of the Night (One time)

== Mixed martial arts record ==
Professional record breakdown
9 matches	6 wins	3 losses
By knockout	3	1
By submission	2	1
By decision	1	1

Res.	Record	Opponent	Method	Event	Date	Round	Time	Location	Notes
Loss	6–3	Dan Hooker	Submission (guillotine choke)	UFC Fight Night: Hunt vs. Mir	March 20, 2016	1	1:24	Brisbane, Australia	
Loss	6–2	Levan Makashvili	Decision (split)	UFC Fight Night: Edgar vs. Faber	May 16, 2015	3	5:00	Pasay, Philippines	
Loss	6–1	Kevin Souza	TKO (punches)	The Ultimate Fighter Brazil 3 Finale: Miocic vs. Maldonado	May 31, 2014	2	4:52	São Paulo, Brazil	Fight of the Night.
Win	6–0	Jumabieke Tuerxun	Decision (unanimous)	The Ultimate Fighter China Finale: Kim vs. Hathaway	March 1, 2014	3	5:00	Macau, SAR, China	
Win	5–0	Alex Lee	Submission (rear-naked choke)	Legend Fighting Championship 4	January 27, 2011	1	4:22	Hong Kong, SAR, China	
Win	4–0	Engie Piloto	Submission (rear-naked choke)	URCC Cebu 4: Proving Ground	June 20, 2009	1	3:44	Mandaue, Philippines	
Win	3–0	Alvin Clerino	TKO (punches)	Sambo Combat Championship 1	March 14, 2009	1	N/A	Manila, Philippines	
Win	2–0	Duke Villanueva	TKO (punches)	FFC - Relentless	March 10, 2007	1	N/A	Pasig, Philippines	
Win	1–0	Andrew Benibe	TKO (punches)	FFC - Qualifying	April 15, 2006	2	N/A	Pasig, Philippines	

== See also ==
- List of current UFC fighters
- List of male mixed martial artists
