= Venator Fighting Championship =

MMA promotion

Venator FC
- Company type: Private
- Industry: Martial arts promotion
- Founded: 2014
- Founder: Frank Merenda
- Headquarters: Milan, Italy
- Owner: Venator Fighting Championship S.r.l.
- Website: www.venatorfc.com

Venator FC shortened to (VFC) is a professional mixed martial arts (MMA) promotion based in Milan, Italy. Founded in 2014 by Frank Merenda, the organization is well known in Europe for hosting exciting MMA events featuring both local and international fighters. Venator FC aims to promote the growth of MMA in Italy and has gained recognition for its competitive matchups and emphasis on developing European talent.

== Events ==
#	Event name	Date	Location	Main event
1	Venator FC 1	December 21, 2014	Bologna, Italy	Mattia Schiavolin vs. Matt Horwich
2	Venator FC: Guerrieri Italiani Quarterfinals	January 15, 2015	Castel Maggiore, Italy	[Main Event Not Specified]
3	Venator FC: Guerrieri Italiani Semifinals	March 29, 2015	Castel Maggiore, Italy	[Main Event Not Specified]
4	Venator FC: Guerrieri Italiani Finals	May 30, 2015	Bologna, Italy	[Main Event Not Specified]
5	Venator FC 2	December 12, 2015	Rimini, Italy	Mattia Schiavolin vs. Luke Barnatt
6	Venator FC 3	May 21, 2016	Milan, Italy	Rousimar Palhares vs. Emil Weber Meek
7	Venator FC: Venator Fight Night 1	May 27, 2017	Bellaria-Igea Marina, Italy	[Main Event Not Specified]
8	Venator FC: Kingdom 1	October 14, 2017	Milan, Italy	[Main Event Not Specified]
9	Venator FC: Kingdom 2	December 16, 2017	Milan, Italy	[Main Event Not Specified]
10	Venator FC 4	May 19, 2018	Milan, Italy	Mattia Schiavolin vs. Andreas Michailidis
11	Venator FC: Venator Inside 1	November 17, 2018	Busto Arsizio, Italy	[Main Event Not Specified]
12	Venator FC: Venator Inside 2	December 1, 2018	Lugano, Switzerland	[Main Event Not Specified]
13	Venator FC 5	March 8, 2019	Lecco, Italy	Marvin Vettori vs. Stefano Paternò
14	Venator FC: Venator Fight Night 2	June 8, 2019	Altamura, Italy	[Main Event Not Specified]
15	Venator FC: Venator Inside 3	November 9, 2019	Montecatini Terme, Italy	[Main Event Not Specified]
16	Venator FC: Venator Inside 4	November 23, 2019	Castelletto sopra Ticino, Italy	[Main Event Not Specified]
17	Venator FC 6	March 27, 2021	Pescara, Italy	Domenico Colangelo vs. Giovanni Melillo
18	Venator FC 7	June 19, 2021	Rome, Italy	Micol di Segni vs. Cornelia Holm
19	Venator FC 8	October 30, 2021	Montecatini Terme, Italy	Angelo Rubino vs. Marco Saccaro
20	Venator FC 9	December 18, 2021	Chieti, Italy	Giovanni Melillo vs. Amiran Gogoladze
21	Venator FC 10	March 5, 2022	Cento, Italy	Manolo Zecchini vs. Karomatullo Sufiev
22	Venator FC 11	May 14, 2022	Pescara, Italy	Domenico Colangelo vs. Stefano Paternò
23	Venator FC: Contender	June 12, 2022	Monsummano Terme, Italy	[Main Event Not Specified]
24	Venator FC 12	October 8, 2022	Montecatini Terme, Italy	Stefano Paternò vs. Kevin Hangs
25	Venator FC 13	December 17, 2022	Chieti, Italy	Michael Pagani vs. Simone D'Anna
26	Venator FC: Gloria Venator Tournament	February 5, 2023	Rome, Italy	[Main Event Not Specified]
27	Venator FC 14	March 4, 2023	Rome, Italy	Michael Pagani vs. David Mora

== List Of Champions ==
=== Middleweight ===
- Luke Barnatt(1 def)
- Pietro Penini
- Mattia Schiavolin(1 def)

=== Welterweight ===
- Marvin Vettori
- Emil Meek
- Stefano Paternò(1 def)
- Maurício Reis

=== Lightweight ===
- Ouadia Tergui
- Ivan Musardo
- Danilo Belluardo
- Leonardo Zecchi

=== Featherweight ===
- Federico Mini
- Antonio Roberto(Interim)
- Federico Mini

=== Bantamweight ===
- Davide Baneschi

=== Flyweight ===
- Giacomo Santoro
