= Raphaël Martinetti =

Swiss businessman

Raphaël Martinetti is a Swiss businessman and was the president of the International Federation of Associated Wrestling Styles (FILA) from 2002 to 2013. He was elected to this position in 2002, succeeding Milan Ercegan from Yugoslavia. Previously, Martinetti was head of the FILA officiating committee and served on the FILA Bureau for twenty years.

Martinetti resigned as the FILA President at the 15–16 February 2013 meeting of the FILA Executive Committee, after a no confidence vote. The resignation followed the decision by the IOC less than a week earlier to remove wrestling from the list of core olympic sports, that are guaranteed to be represented at the olympics, starting with the 2020 Summer Olympic Games. The FILA Executive Committee appointed Nenad Lalović to be an interim FILA President until a new President is elected at a FILA congress.

Raphael Martinetti and his wife were ordered by the Swiss government to pay €2.5 million tax on €6.5 million given to the couple in 2010 and 2012 by unnamed persons in Azerbaijan.

Preceded by Milan Ercegan	President of the International Federation of Associated Wrestling Styles; 2002–2013	Succeeded by Nenad Lalović
