= The Ultimate Fighter: Brazil 3 =

UFC mixed martial arts television series and event in 201 4

- Season 3
- Starring: Dana White, Wanderlei Silva, and Chael Sonnen

Release
- Original network: Globo
- Original release: March 9 – May 25, 2014

Season chronology
- ← Previous; The Ultimate Fighter: Brazil 2 Next → The Ultimate Fighter: Brazil 4

The Ultimate Fighter: Brazil 3 is an installment of the Ultimate Fighting Championship (UFC)-produced reality television series The Ultimate Fighter. It is the sixth series to be produced outside the United States and the third to film in Brazil.

On October 22, 2013, Wanderlei Silva and Chael Sonnen were announced as coaches for the season. The UFC held open tryouts for the show on November 11, 2013. The casting call was for Middleweight, Light Heavyweight, Heavyweight fighters who are at least 21 years old and have a minimum of two wins in three professional fights. It was announced on January 7, 2014 that the show would feature middleweight and heavyweight fighters. The cast was revealed on February 26, 2014

That was the second time that Silva and Sonnen coached an Ultimate Fighter season. Silva previously coached The Ultimate Fighter: Brazil and Sonnen coached The Ultimate Fighter: Team Jones vs. Team Sonnen. It was also the first time that a non-Brazilian fighter coached a team in The Ultimate Fighter: Brazil series. A new twist presented two Brazilian former athletes who had huge experience in their sports. They were to provide counseling for their teams about their previous experiences in their own sports. 1996 Olympic Games silver medalist and 1994 FIBA Women's World Championship champion in basketball, Hortência Marcari was to be a part of Team Sonnen. Former 1980 and 1984 Olympic Games volleyball competitor and former beach volleyball world champion Isabel Salgado was to be a part of Team Wanderlei.

== Cast ==
=== Coaches ===
Team Wanderlei

- Wanderlei Silva, head coach
- André Amado, Muay Thai coach
- Fábio Gurgel, jiu jitsu coach
- Daniel Acácio, wrestling coach
- Isabel Salgado, sports advisor

Team Sonnen

- Chael Sonnen, head coach
- Clayton Hires, boxing coach
- Vinny Magalhães, jiu jitsu Coach
- Scott McQuary
- Jamie Huey
- Hortência Marcari, sports advisor

=== Fighters ===
- Team Wanderlei
  - Middleweights: Paulo Costa, Wagner Silva, Ricardo Abreu, and Ismael de Jesus.
  - Heavyweights: Jollyson Francisco, Antônio Carlos Júnior, Richardson Moreira, and Antônio Branjão.
- Team Sonnen
  - Middleweights: Joilton Santos, Guilherme Vasconcelos, Warlley Alves, and Márcio Alexandre Júnior.
  - Heavyweights: Job Kleber Melo, Edgard Castaldelli Filho, Marcos Rogério de Lima, and Vitor Miranda.
- Fighters eliminated before entry round
  - Middleweights: José Roberto, Douglas Moura, Cristiano Pontes, Willian Steindorf, Markus Perez Echeimberg, Pedro Paulino, Wendell Oliveira, Giuliano Arante.
  - Heavyweights: Gonçalo Salgado, Everton Rocha, Felipe Dantas, Guilherme Viana, Alexandre Machado, Thiago Santos, Fernando Camoles, Bruno Silva.

=== Guests ===
- Gabi Garcia
- Maurício "Shogun" Rua
- Yushin Okami
- Luiz Carlos Dórea
- André Pederneiras
- Bruce Buffer
- Eric Albarracin

== Episodes ==
Episode 1: (March 9, 2014)

- Wanderlei Silva and Chael Sonnen reveal their thoughts about their presence on this season and their expectations for their rivalry. Isabel Salgado and Hortência Marcari also share their motivation as guest coaches. Later, all four coaches greet the contestants before the preliminary fights begin.
- The fights to get into the house were divided into two parts, half in this episode and half in the second episode.
- The 16 preliminary fights begin:

Job Kleber Melo defeated Gonçalo Salgado via knockout (head kick) in the first round.
Paulo Costa defeated José Roberto via submission (guillotine choke) in the second round.
Jollyson Francisco defeated Everton Rocha via submission (arm-triangle choke) in the first round.
Joilton Santos defeated Douglas Moura via split decision after three rounds.
Edgard Castaldelli Filho defeated Felipe Dantas via TKO (punches) in the second round.
Wagner Silva defeated Cristiano Pontes via submission (rear-naked choke) in the first round.
Ricardo Abreu defeated Willian Steindorf via TKO (punches) in the second round.
Antônio Carlos Júnior defeated Guilherme Viana via TKO (punches) in the first round.

Episode 2: (March 16, 2014)

- The 16 preliminary fights continue:

Richardson Moreira defeated Alexandre Machado via knockout (punches) in the first round.
Guilherme Vasconcelos defeated Markus Perez Echeimberg via submission (rear-naked choke) in the first round.
Marcos Rogério de Lima defeated Thiago Santos via submission (guillotine choke) in the first round.
Ismael de Jesus defeated Pedro Paulino via TKO (finger injury) in the first round.
Antônio Branjão defeated Fernando Camoles via TKO (punches) in the second round.
Warlley Alves defeated Wendell Oliveira via split decision after three rounds.
Márcio Alexandre Júnior defeated Giuliano Arante via submission (guillotine choke) in the first round.
Vitor Miranda defeated Bruno Silva via knockout (head kick) in the second round.

- Silva and Sonnen welcome the winning fighters to the season. But before they pick the teams, Silva demands that Sonnen apologize to the cameras for something he said about Brazil during a press conference in Rio de Janeiro for his UFC 148 title fight against Anderson Silva.
- Sonnen refuses to make an apology and Silva announces that he will not come back until he sees him apologize. After some private discussion between the two, Silva decides to leave.
- Later, a day before the Ultimate Fighter Brazil 3 Finale, Sonnen revealed in a scrum session that after Silva had left the premises he called Vitor Belfort asserting that Silva fears Belfort more than Sonnen himself. Before the call, Sonnen instructed the crew of the show to tell Silva that Belfort was replacing him if he leaves. However, at that time Belfort was concentrating on a middleweight title match against Chris Weidman and could not replace Silva.

Episode 3: (March 23, 2014)

- Silva returns to the training center despite no apology from Sonnen.
- He then flips a coin (yellow for Wanderlei, green for Sonnen) to decide who the first pick (either first fight or first fighter). Silva wins the toss and opts to choose the first fight. Sonnen chooses the first middleweight and Silva the first heavyweight.
- Middleweights selection:

Coach	1st Pick	2nd Pick	3rd Pick	4th Pick
Sonnen	Márcio Alexandre Júnior	Joilton Santos	Warlley Alves	Guilherme Vasconcelos
Wanderlei	Ricardo Abreu	Paulo Costa	Wagner Silva	Ismael de Jesus

- Heavyweights selection:

Coach	1st Pick	2nd Pick	3rd Pick	4th Pick
Wanderlei	Antônio Carlos Júnior	Jollyson Francisco	Richardson Moreira	Antônio Branjão
Sonnen	Marcos Rogério de Lima	Vitor Miranda	Edgard Castaldelli Filho	Job Kleber Melo

- Sonnen tells Silva to call the program "Wanderlei's show" instead of Ultimate Fighter and Silva gets angry to the point of pushing and threatening him.
- A contest to decide a new Brazilian ring girl is announced by Marcari and Salgado, with the fighters as the judges.
- Silva announces the first fight and matches Wagner Silva against Santos.
- Wagner Silva defeated Joilton Santos via split decision in three rounds.

Episode 4: (March 30, 2014)

- Silva announces the first heavyweight fight and puts Carlos Júnior against Filho.
- Both fighters share some of their personal life experiences, including Filho's newborn son and Carlos Júnior's experience with his father leaving him.
- Salgado and Marcari create experiences with their respective teams that remind their previous sports and both get approval from their main coaches.
- Some of Team Sonnen's fighters discuss their opinions of their head coach. They mention that their impression of Sonnen has changed, but they will cheer for Silva when the two coaches fight, due to being long time fans of their countryman.
- Antônio Carlos Júnior defeated Edgard Castaldelli Filho via KO (punch) in the first round.
- One fighter from each team is chosen to take part in a special challenge. They must to push a large ball across a muddy field into their opponent's goal to determine the next fight pick and Jollyson Francisco wins for his team.

Episode 5: (April 6, 2014)

- Silva announces the next middleweight fight: Abreu against Vasconcelos, both men are Brazilian jiu jitsu world champions.
- The teams participate in a challenge to each build a raft and race each other with them. Team Wanderlei manages to finish first and they get a special dinner served by the losing team.
- Ricardo Abreu defeated Guilherme Vasconcelos via unanimous decision in two rounds.

Episode 6: (April 13, 2014)

- The next heavyweight fight is supposed to be announced by Silva, but he is nowhere to be found. He eventually arrives and the fight is revealed as Moreira against Kleber.
- Sonnen complains about Silva's excuses for being late and even mentions that he smells alcohol from his opponent.
- During a training session, Moreira accidentally hits his knee on Jollyson Francisco's eyebrow. Francisco gets stitches to heal the wound and he is afraid that accidents like that could put him out of the competition.
- Both teams participate in a challenge to write TUF: Brasil using a strings-based device that requires them to work together so the words are correctly written and approved by a professor.
- Team Sonnen finally ends their overall losing streak and Marcari announces that their team will participate in a pajamas party at the house while their opponents will be locked in a room as the party goes on.
- Antônio Carlos Júnior confronts Paulo Costa about statements Costa made about defeating him several times during a training camp as preparation for this season. Carlos Júnior says that somebody told him so and Costa reveals that he had only mentioned training with him and that they had both defeated each other but it was "no big deal." Carlos Júnior leaves the room upset and he continues to argue with Costa.
- Gabrielle Garcia, a multi-time BJJ world champion, participates as a guest coach in Team Wanderlei's training session.
- Before the weigh-ins, Silva confronts Sonnen about their future fight. He is aggressive towards Sonnen, offends him and even threatens to slap his face.
- Sonnen pushes Silva, leading to the Brazilian attempting to punch Sonnen, who ducks and takes down Silva. After they reach the floor, the whole coaching staff and fighters from both teams try to separate them.
- Instead of trying to keep the peace like the rest, André Amade punches Sonnen in the back of the head and later brags about punching him and ripping his shirt off. Vinny Magalhães tells Sonnen that Amade was punching him, something that he did not notice during the altercation. The entire team is perplexed with Amade's attitude.
- Richardson Moreira defeated Job Kleber Melo via submission (armbar) in the first round.
- Kleber breaks his finger during the fight.

Episode 7: (April 20, 2014)

- Silva is at the doctor's office and states that his hand has been bothering him since the scuffle. The doctor puts it in a cast.
- Dana White later appears via video conference and expels André Amade from the show for punching Sonnen in the brawl. He calls him a disgrace and says that he should be arrested.
- White then scolds Silva and Sonnen for being thuggish and poor mentors for the fighters. Sonnen then blames Silva, who praises Amade's actions and even gives a team huddle for the coach leaving.
- Mauricio "Shogun" Rua, former UFC light heavyweight champion, makes a guest appearance and lends support to Team Wanderlei.
- Márcio Alexandre Júnior defeated Paulo Costa via split decision after three rounds.
- The episode closes with a "wrapped up" challenge in which four fighters from each team are covered in plastic wrap. They have to scramble to get on their feet and ring a bell. First team to get all four fighters to ring the bell wins and gets to choose the next fight.
- The yellow team wins the challenge and gets all fighters to ring the bell before Team Sonnen even has one, earning control of the next fight matchup.

Episode 8: (April 27, 2014)

- Márcio Alexandre Júnior is limping around the house, having injured his foot against Paulo Costa. The doctors say that it should not hamper his fighting.
- Silva announces the next fight and matches Antônio Branjão against Vitor Miranda. The two happen to be former training partners and are not happy about the fight pick.
- Team Sonnen coach Vinny Magalhães hears about this and calls Silva a hypocrite. A flashback plays to TUF Brazil 1 when Silva confronted Vitor Belfort about making two friends fight. Silva then states that this is different in that Branjão and Miranda may know each other, but "they don't train with or live together."
- The kitchen is filled with dirty dishes and Antônio Carlos Júnior has had enough. He confronts Joilton Santos about it who then gets upset about Júnior complaining and not doing anything. Finally, Ricardo Abreu gets tired of the complaining and decides to do the cleaning himself.
- Sonnen brings in World Series of Fighting middleweight Yushin Okami as a guest coach, who ramps up the intensity levels of the training.
- The next challenge is called "the bridge," where members of each team work together to create a bridge using narrow sticks that can support one of the Octagon ring girls. The team then has to guide four different ring girls across their makeshift structures. Team Wanderlei takes an early lead and wins the challenge and an all-day spa treatment.
- Miranda tells his tale of how he started playing basketball, but after a Muay Thai class, switched to fighting. After moving to the United States to train, his 4-year-old son drowned in a swimming pool. He then states that he will use this tragedy to motivate him.
- Branjão admits to having been picked on in the past due to being overweight, but states that the bullies would not try now.
- Vitor Miranda defeated Antônio Branjão via TKO (punches) in the first round.
- Both coaches praise the fighter's performance.

Episode 9: (May 5, 2014)

- The Coaches' Challenge between Silva and Sonnen is an obstacle course on the football pitch. The winner will receive $23,000 for himself, $10,000 for his team, and a football jersey signed by Pelé.
- Sonnen blows by the competition and wins the Coaches' Challenge. Silva declares this victory as meaningless and states that he will ultimately win when he fights Sonnen.
- Luis Dorea joins Team Wanderlei as a boxing coach to replace the expelled André Amade.
- Warlley Alves defeated Ismael de Jesus via KO (knees) at 3:38 in round 1.

Episode 10:

- Marcos Rogério de Lima defeated Jollyson Francisco via unanimous decision after 2 rounds.

Episode 11:

- Warlley Alves defeated Wagner Silva via submission (guillotine choke) in round 1.
- Antônio Carlos Júnior defeated Marcos Rogério de Lima via submission (rear naked choke) in round 1.

Episode 12:

- Márcio Alexandre Júnior defeated Ricardo Abreu via split decision after 3 rounds.
- Vitor Miranda defeated Richardson Moreira via TKO (punches) in round 2.

== Tournament Bracket ==
=== Middleweight Bracket ===
Elimination Round
Wagner Silva	SD
Joilton Santos	3
Ismael de Jesus	1
Warlley Alves	KO
Ricardo Abreu	UD
Guilherme Vasconcelos	2
Paulo Costa	3
Márcio Alexandre Jr.	SD

Semi-finals
Wagner Silva	1
Warlley Alves	SUB
Ricardo Abreu	3
Márcio Alexandre Jr.	SD

Finale
Warlley Alves	SUB
Márcio Alexandre Jr.	3

=== Heavyweight Bracket ===
Elimination Round
Antônio Carlos Júnior	KO
Edgard Castaldelli Filho	1
Jollyson Francisco	U2
Marcos Rogério de Lima	UD
Richardson Moreira	SUB
Job Kleber Melo	1
Antônio Branjão	1
Vitor Miranda	TKO

Semi-finals
Antônio Carlos Júnior	SUB
Marcos Rogério de Lima	1
Richardson Moreira	2
Vitor Miranda	TKO

Finale
Antônio Carlos Júnior	UD
Vitor Miranda	3

Legend
	Team Wanderlei
	Team Sonnen
UD	Unanimous Decision
SD	Split Decision
SUB	Submission
(T)KO	(Technical) Knock Out

=== Bonus awards ===
Fans voted to award the following $25,000 bonus awards to fights that took place during the TUF Brazil 3 season:

- Fight of the Season: Ricardo Abreu vs. Guilherme Vasconcelos
- Performance of the Season: Antônio Carlos Júnior (knockout of Edgard Castadelli) and Warlley Alves (submission of Wagner Gomes)

== The Ultimate Fighter Brazil 3 Finale: Miocic vs. Maldonado ==
The Ultimate Fighter Brazil 3 Finale: Miocic vs. Maldonado
- The poster for The Ultimate Fighter Brazil 3 Finale: Miocic vs. Maldonado
- Promotion: Ultimate Fighting Championship
- Date: May 31, 2014
- Venue: Ginásio do Ibirapuera
- City: São Paulo, Brazil
- Attendance: 8,986

Event chronology
UFC Fight Night: Muñoz vs. Mousasi	The Ultimate Fighter Brazil 3 Finale: Miocic vs. Maldonado	UFC Fight Night: Henderson vs. Khabilov

The Ultimate Fighter Brazil 3 Finale: Miocic vs. Maldonado (also known as UFC Fight Night: Miocic vs. Maldonado) was a mixed martial arts event held by the Ultimate Fighting Championship. It took place on May 31, 2014, at the Ginásio do Ibirapuera arena in São Paulo, Brazil.

=== Background ===
The event was the third held in São Paulo following UFC Brazil in 1998 and UFC on FX: Belfort vs. Bisping in 2013.

The event was expected to be headlined by a light heavyweight bout between the coaches of The Ultimate Fighter: Brazil 3 Chael Sonnen and Wanderlei Silva. The fight was originally scheduled for UFC 173 but later shifted to this card. However, the fight was transferred to July 5, 2014 at UFC 175.

A heavyweight bout between Junior dos Santos and Stipe Miocic was also shifted from UFC 173 to headline this card. On May 5, 2014 Dos Santos pulled out of the fight, citing a hand injury and was replaced by Fábio Maldonado.

Mike Pierce was expected to face Demian Maia. However, Pierce had to pull out of the fight due to a broken hand. Maia instead faced UFC newcomer Alexander Yakovlev.

Wilson Reis was briefly linked to a bout with Pedro Munhoz at the event. However, Reis was replaced by promotional newcomer Matt Hobar.

Diego Brandão was expected to face Brian Ortega to make his promotional debut. However, Brandão pulled out of the bout in the days leading up to the event citing an injury. Due to the late nature of the change, officials did not try to find a replacement and Ortega was pulled from the card despite being uninjured.

=== Results ===
Fight card (Fox Sports 1)
Weight class				Method	Round	Time	Notes
Heavyweight	Stipe Miocic	def.	Fábio Maldonado	TKO (punches)	1	0:35
Heavyweight	Antônio Carlos Júnior	def.	Vitor Miranda	Decision (unanimous) (30–27, 30–27, 29–28)	3	5:00	(Note: The Ultimate Fighter Brazil 3 Heavyweight final)
Middleweight	Warlley Alves	def.	Márcio Alexandre Jr.	Technical Submission (guillotine choke)	3	0:25	(Note: The Ultimate Fighter Brazil 3 Middleweight final)
Welterweight	Demian Maia	def.	Alexander Yakovlev	Decision (unanimous) (30–27, 30–27, 30–27)	3	5:00
Featherweight	Robbie Peralta	def.	Rony Jason	Decision (split) (29–28, 27–30, 30–27)	3	5:00
Preliminary card (Fox Sports 1)
Lightweight	Rashid Magomedov	def.	Rodrigo Damm	Decision (unanimous) (30–27, 30–27, 30–27)	3	5:00
Lightweight	Elias Silverio	def.	Ernest Chavez	Submission (rear-naked choke)	3	4:21
Welterweight	Gasan Umalatov	def.	Paulo Thiago	Decision (unanimous) (30–27, 30–27, 29–28)	3	5:00
Featherweight	Kevin Souza	def.	Mark Eddiva	TKO (punches)	2	4:52
Preliminary card (UFC Fight Pass)
Middleweight	Ricardo Abreu	def.	Wagner Silva	Submission (rear-naked choke)	2	1:06
Heavyweight	Marcos Rogério de Lima	def.	Richardson Moreira	KO (punches)	1	0:20
Bantamweight	Pedro Munhoz	def.	Matt Hobar	TKO (punches)	1	2:47

=== Bonus awards ===
The following fighters received $50,000 bonuses:

- Fight of the Night: Kevin Souza vs. Mark Eddiva
- Performance of the Night: Warlley Alves and Stipe Miocic

== See also ==
- The Ultimate Fighter
- List of UFC events
- 2014 in UFC
