= Andre Fili =

American mixed martial artist (born 1990)

- Born: Andre Riley Givens; June 25, 1990 (age 36); Federal Way, Washington, U.S.
- Other names: Touchy
- Height: 5 ft 10 in (1.78 m)
- Weight: 145 lb (66 kg; 10 st 5 lb)
- Division: Featherweight
- Reach: 74 in (188 cm)
- Fighting out of: Sacramento, California, U.S.
- Team: Team Alpha Male
- Years active: 2009–present

Mixed martial arts record
- Total: 41
- Wins: 26
- By knockout: 11
- By submission: 3
- By decision: 12
- Losses: 14
- By knockout: 5
- By submission: 3
- By decision: 6
- No contests: 1

Other information
- Mixed martial arts record from Sherdog

Andre Riley Givens-Fili (born Andre Riley Givens; June 25, 1990) is an American professional mixed martial artist who currently competes in the Featherweight division of the Ultimate Fighting Championship (UFC).

== Background ==
Fili is of Samoan and Native Hawaiian descent. He grew up in a broken home, where both of the parents were violent against each other and also their children. Fili's mother raised her kids alone, as her husband was serving jail time on multiple occasions and was not living in the house. The violent and unstable upbringing left its mark on Fili, and he started seeking out street brawls as a teenager. In 2009, Fili moved to Sacramento and while still under probation, he joined Team Alpha Male and began training mixed martial arts.

== Mixed martial arts career ==
Fili made his professional debut on December 12, 2009, against Anthony Motley. Fili won the fight via TKO and won his next three fights via TKO as well. Fili suffered his first loss, by knee injury, against Strikeforce vet Derrick Burnsed. Fili bounced back from the loss winning his next 8 fights including a win over Strikeforce veteran Alexander Crispim.

=== Ultimate Fighting Championship ===
Fili made his promotional debut on October 19, 2013, at UFC 166 against Jeremy Larsen. Fili, who was in the middle of a training camp for a welterweight bout in another promotion, took the featherweight fight on short notice (two weeks) to replace an injured Charles Oliveira. The bout was contested at a catchweight, as Fili was unable to make the required weight. Fili won the fight via TKO in the second round.

Fili faced Max Holloway on April 26, 2014, at UFC 172. He lost the fight via submission in the third round.

Fili was expected to face Sean Soriano on September 5, 2014, at UFC Fight Night 50. However, Fili was forced from the bout with an injury and replaced by Chas Skelly.

Fili faced Felipe Arantes on October 25, 2014, at UFC 179. He won via unanimous decision.

Fili faced Godofredo Pepey on March 21, 2015, at UFC Fight Night 62. He lost the fight via submission in the first round.

Fili was expected to face Clay Collard on September 5, 2015, at UFC 191. However, Fili was forced out of the bout with injury and replaced by Tiago Trator.

Fili faced Gabriel Benítez on November 21, 2015, at The Ultimate Fighter Latin America 2 Finale. He won the fight via knockout in the first round and also earned a Performance of the Night bonus.

Fili faced Yair Rodríguez on April 23, 2016, at UFC 197. Fili lost the fight via knockout in the second round.

Fili faced Hacran Dias on October 1, 2016, at UFC Fight Night 96, filling in for an injured Brian Ortega. He won the fight via unanimous decision.

Fili was expected to face Doo Ho Choi on July 29, 2017, at UFC 214. However Choi pulled out of the fight and was replaced by promotional newcomer Calvin Kattar. Fili lost the fight by unanimous decision.

Fili faced Artem Lobov on October 21, 2017, at UFC Fight Night 118. He won the fight via unanimous decision.

Fili faced Dennis Bermudez on January 27, 2018, at UFC on Fox 27. He won the fight via split decision.

Fili faced Michael Johnson on August 25, 2018, at UFC Fight Night 135. He lost the fight via split decision.

Fili faced Myles Jury on February 17, 2019, at UFC on ESPN 1. He won the fight by unanimous decision.

Fili faced Sheymon Moraes on July 13, 2019, at UFC Fight Night 155. He won the fight via knockout in round one. This win earned him the Performance of the Night award.

Fili faced Sodiq Yusuff on January 18, 2020, at UFC 246. He lost the fight by unanimous decision.

Fili faced Charles Jourdain on June 13, 2020, at UFC on ESPN 10. He won the bout via split decision.

Fili faced Bryce Mitchell on October 31, 2020, at UFC Fight Night 181. He lost the fight via unanimous decision.

Fili faced Daniel Pineda on June 26, 2021, at UFC Fight Night 190. Early in round two, Fili accidentally poked Pineda in the eye and he was deemed unable to continue. The fight was declared a no contest.

Fili faced Joanderson Brito on April 30, 2022, at UFC on ESPN 35. He lost the fight via TKO in round one.

Fili was scheduled to face Lando Vannata on September 17, 2022, at UFC Fight Night 210. However, Vannata was forced to pull from the event due to injury and was replaced by Bill Algeo. Fili won the fight via split decision.

Fili was scheduled to face Lucas Almeida on February 25, 2023, at UFC Fight Night 220. However, Fili was forced to withdraw from the bout due to emergency eye surgery.

Fili faced Nathaniel Wood on July 22, 2023, at UFC Fight Night 224. He lost the fight via unanimous decision.

Fili faced Lucas Almeida on December 16, 2023, at UFC 296. He won the fight via technical knockout in the first round.

Fili faced Dan Ige, replacing injured Lerone Murphy, on February 10, 2024, at UFC Fight Night 236. He lost the bout by knockout in the first round.

Fili faced Cub Swanson on June 29, 2024, at UFC 303. He won the fight by split decision. 13 out of 15 media outlets scored the bout for Swanson. This fight earned him a Fight of the Night award.

Fili faced Melquizael Costa on February 22, 2025 at UFC Fight Night 252. He lost the fight via a guillotine choke submission in the first round.

Fili faced Christian Rodriguez on August 9, 2025 at UFC on ESPN 72. He won the fight by split decision. This was Fili's fifth split decision win, which ties Gleison Tibau for most in UFC history.

Fili faced José Miguel Delgado on March 14, 2026 at UFC Fight Night 269. He lost the fight by split decision.

Replacing Giga Chikadze, Fili faced Vinicius Oliveira on June 20, 2026, at UFC Fight Night 279. He lost the fight by technical knockout in the second round. This fight earned him a $100,000 Fight of the Night award.

Fili faced Kai Kamaka III on October 10, 2026, at UFC Fight Night 290. He won the fight by knockout via a head kick in the second round. This fight earned him a $100,000 Performance of the Night award.

== Professional grappling career ==
Fili made his professional grappling debut against Shane Shapiro at UFC Fight Pass Invitational 2 on July 3, 2022. He lost the bout via split decision.

== Championships and awards ==
- Ultimate Fighting Championship
  - Fight of the Night (Two times) vs. Cub Swanson and Vinicius Oliveira
  - Performance of the Night (Three times) vs. Gabriel Benítez, Sheymon Moraes and Kai Kamaka III
  - Second most bouts in UFC Featherweight division history (28) (behind Darren Elkins)
  - Tied (Alexander Volkanovski for fourth most wins in UFC Featherweight division history (14)
  - Tied (Max Holloway, Alexander Volkanovski & Movsar Evloev) for second most decision wins in UFC Featherweight division history (9) (behind Cub Swanson)
  - Fourth most total fight time in UFC Featherweight division history (4:53:51)
  - Fourth most takedowns landed in UFC Featherweight division history (43)
  - Fifth most significant strikes landed in UFC Featherweight division history (1171)
    - Fifth most total strikes landed in UFC Featherweight division history (1384)
  - Most split decision wins in UFC Featherweight division history (5)
    - Tied (Gleison Tibau & Sean Strickland) for most split decision wins in UFC history (5)

== Mixed martial arts record ==
Professional record breakdown
| 41 matches | 26 wins | 14 losses |
| By knockout | 11 | 5 |
| By submission | 3 | 3 |
| By decision | 12 | 6 |
| No contests | 1 | |

| Res. | Record | Opponent | Method | Event | Date | Round | Time | Location | Notes |
|---|---|---|---|---|---|---|---|---|---|
| Win | 26–14 (1) | Kai Kamaka III | KO (head kick) | UFC Fight Night: Allen vs. Duncan | October 10, 2026 | 2 | 0:22 | Las Vegas, Nevada, United States | Performance of the Night. |
| Loss | 25–14 (1) | Vinicius Oliveira | TKO (elbows and punches) | UFC Fight Night: Kape vs. Horiguchi | June 20, 2026 | 2 | 4:56 | Las Vegas, Nevada, United States | Fight of the Night. |
| Loss | 25–13 (1) | José Miguel Delgado | Decision (split) | UFC Fight Night: Emmett vs. Vallejos | March 14, 2026 | 3 | 5:00 | Las Vegas, Nevada, United States | |
| Win | 25–12 (1) | Christian Rodriguez | Decision (split) | UFC on ESPN: Dolidze vs. Hernandez | August 9, 2025 | 3 | 5:00 | Las Vegas, Nevada, United States | |
| Loss | 24–12 (1) | Melquizael Costa | Submission (guillotine choke) | UFC Fight Night: Cejudo vs. Song | February 22, 2025 | 1 | 4:30 | Seattle, Washington, United States | |
| Win | 24–11 (1) | Cub Swanson | Decision (split) | UFC 303 | June 29, 2024 | 3 | 5:00 | Las Vegas, Nevada, United States | Fight of the Night. |
| Loss | 23–11 (1) | Dan Ige | KO (punches) | UFC Fight Night: Hermansson vs. Pyfer | February 10, 2024 | 1 | 2:43 | Las Vegas, Nevada, United States | |
| Win | 23–10 (1) | Lucas Almeida | TKO (punches) | UFC 296 | December 16, 2023 | 1 | 3:32 | Las Vegas, Nevada, United States | |
| Loss | 22–10 (1) | Nathaniel Wood | Decision (unanimous) | UFC Fight Night: Aspinall vs. Tybura | July 22, 2023 | 3 | 5:00 | London, England | |
| Win | 22–9 (1) | Bill Algeo | Decision (split) | UFC Fight Night: Sandhagen vs. Song | September 17, 2022 | 3 | 5:00 | Las Vegas, Nevada, United States | |
| Loss | 21–9 (1) | Joanderson Brito | TKO (punches) | UFC on ESPN: Font vs. Vera | April 30, 2022 | 1 | 0:41 | Las Vegas, Nevada, United States | |
| NC | 21–8 (1) | Daniel Pineda | NC (accidental eye poke) | UFC Fight Night: Gane vs. Volkov | June 26, 2021 | 2 | 0:46 | Las Vegas, Nevada, United States | Accidental eye poke rendered Pineda unable to continue. |
| Loss | 21–8 | Bryce Mitchell | Decision (unanimous) | UFC Fight Night: Hall vs. Silva | October 31, 2020 | 3 | 5:00 | Las Vegas, Nevada, United States | |
| Win | 21–7 | Charles Jourdain | Decision (split) | UFC on ESPN: Eye vs. Calvillo | June 13, 2020 | 3 | 5:00 | Las Vegas, Nevada, United States | |
| Loss | 20–7 | Sodiq Yusuff | Decision (unanimous) | UFC 246 | January 18, 2020 | 3 | 5:00 | Las Vegas, Nevada, United States | |
| Win | 20–6 | Sheymon Moraes | KO (punches) | UFC Fight Night: de Randamie vs. Ladd | July 13, 2019 | 1 | 3:07 | Sacramento, California, United States | Performance of the Night. |
| Win | 19–6 | Myles Jury | Decision (unanimous) | UFC on ESPN: Ngannou vs. Velasquez | February 17, 2019 | 3 | 5:00 | Phoenix, Arizona, United States | |
| Loss | 18–6 | Michael Johnson | Decision (split) | UFC Fight Night: Gaethje vs. Vick | August 25, 2018 | 3 | 5:00 | Lincoln, Nebraska, United States | |
| Win | 18–5 | Dennis Bermudez | Decision (split) | UFC on Fox: Jacaré vs. Brunson 2 | January 27, 2018 | 3 | 5:00 | Charlotte, North Carolina, United States | |
| Win | 17–5 | Artem Lobov | Decision (unanimous) | UFC Fight Night: Cowboy vs. Till | October 21, 2017 | 3 | 5:00 | Gdańsk, Poland | |
| Loss | 16–5 | Calvin Kattar | Decision (unanimous) | UFC 214 | July 29, 2017 | 3 | 5:00 | Anaheim, California, United States | |
| Win | 16–4 | Hacran Dias | Decision (unanimous) | UFC Fight Night: Lineker vs. Dodson | October 1, 2016 | 3 | 5:00 | Portland, Oregon, United States | Catchweight (148.5 lb) bout; Dias missed weight. |
| Loss | 15–4 | Yair Rodríguez | KO (head kick) | UFC 197 | April 23, 2016 | 2 | 2:15 | Las Vegas, Nevada, United States | |
| Win | 15–3 | Gabriel Benítez | KO (head kick and punches) | The Ultimate Fighter Latin America 2 Finale: Magny vs. Gastelum | November 21, 2015 | 1 | 3:13 | Monterrey, Mexico | Performance of the Night. |
| Loss | 14–3 | Godofredo Pepey | Submission (flying triangle choke) | UFC Fight Night: Maia vs. LaFlare | March 21, 2015 | 1 | 3:14 | Rio de Janeiro, Brazil | |
| Win | 14–2 | Felipe Arantes | Decision (unanimous) | UFC 179 | October 25, 2014 | 3 | 5:00 | Rio de Janeiro, Brazil | |
| Loss | 13–2 | Max Holloway | Submission (guillotine choke) | UFC 172 | April 26, 2014 | 3 | 3:39 | Baltimore, Maryland, United States | |
| Win | 13–1 | Jeremy Larsen | TKO (punches) | UFC 166 | October 19, 2013 | 2 | 0:53 | Houston, Texas, United States | Catchweight (148.5 lb) bout; Fili missed weight. |
| Win | 12–1 | Adrian Diaz | TKO (punches) | West Coast FC 5 | May 3, 2013 | 3 | 1:29 | Sacramento, California, United States | |
| Win | 11–1 | Enoch Wilson | Decision (unanimous) | Tachi Palace Fights 15 | November 15, 2012 | 3 | 5:00 | Lemoore, California, United States | Catchweight (151 lb) bout. |
| Win | 10–1 | Ricky Wallace | Technical Submission (armbar) | Tachi Palace Fights 14 | September 7, 2012 | 2 | 4:08 | Lemoore, California, United States | |
| Win | 9–1 | Jesse Bowen | TKO (punches) | West Coast FC: Showdown | June 9, 2012 | 1 | 2:57 | Yuba City, California, United States | |
| Win | 8–1 | Matt Muramoto | Submission (triangle choke) | KOTC: All In | April 21, 2012 | 1 | 1:59 | Oroville, California, United States | |
| Win | 7–1 | Alexander Crispim | Decision (unanimous) | Cage Combat FC: The Return | March 3, 2012 | 3 | 5:00 | Santa Rosa, California, United States | |
| Win | 6–1 | Vaymond Dennis | Submission (armbar) | West Coast FC: Bruvado Bash | January 7, 2012 | 2 | 1:51 | Placerville, California, United States | |
| Win | 5–1 | Tony Rios | Decision (unanimous) | Capitol FC: Fall Classic | October 8, 2011 | 3 | 5:00 | Sacramento, California, United States | |
| Loss | 4–1 | Derrick Burnsed | TKO (knee injury) | Rebel Fighter: Domination | October 2, 2010 | 5 | 1:22 | Roseville, California, United States | For the RF Featherweight Championship. |
| Win | 4–0 | Tony Reveles | KO (head kick) | Rebel Fighter: Delima vs. Christensen | August 21, 2010 | 1 | 1:01 | Placerville, California, United States | |
| Win | 3–0 | Justin Smitley | TKO (punches) | Gladiator Challenge: Champions | May 1, 2010 | 2 | 1:41 | Placerville, California, United States | |
| Win | 2–0 | Cain Campos | TKO (punches) | Gladiator Challenge: Domination | March 6, 2010 | 1 | 0:16 | Placerville, California, United States | |
| Win | 1–0 | Anthony Motley | TKO (punches) | Gladiator Challenge: Chain Reaction | December 12, 2009 | 1 | 1:01 | Placerville, California, United States | Featherweight debut. |

== See also ==
- List of current UFC fighters
- List of male mixed martial artists
