= Clay Collard =

American mixed martial arts fighter

- Born: March 10, 1993 (age 33); Payson, Utah, U.S.
- Other names: Cassius
- Height: 5 ft 11 in (1.80 m)
- Weight: 155 lb (70 kg; 11.1 st)
- Division: Welterweight; Lightweight; Featherweight
- Reach: 75 in (190 cm)
- Fighting out of: Las Vegas, Nevada, U.S.
- Team: Team Bonafide
- Trainer: Ryan Ault
- Years active: 2011–present

Professional boxing record
- Total: 18
- Wins: 9
- By knockout: 4
- Losses: 6
- By knockout: 2
- Draws: 3

Mixed martial arts record
- Total: 41
- Wins: 25
- By knockout: 12
- By submission: 3
- By decision: 10
- Losses: 15
- By knockout: 2
- By submission: 4
- By decision: 9
- No contests: 1

Other information
- Boxing record from BoxRec
- Mixed martial arts record from Sherdog

Clay Collard (born March 10, 1993) is an American professional mixed martial artist and former professional boxer. A professional since 2011, he formerly competed for the UFC and the Professional Fighters League.

== Background ==
Collard grew up in Castle Dale, Utah. Collard started wrestling at the age of six, picking up boxing at the age of 11. Collard attended Emery High School, where he lettered in wrestling.

== Mixed martial arts career ==
=== Early career ===
Collard took his first and only amateur mixed martial arts bout less than two weeks after his 18th birthday. He won the bout via 12-second knockout and subsequently turned professional to fight the next weekend. Collard competed solely in Utah regional circuit, amassing a 13–4 (1 NC) record before being signed to the UFC.

=== Ultimate Fighting Championship ===
Collard made his promotional debut on August 23, 2014 as a short notice replacement against Max Holloway at UFC Fight Night 49, replacing an injured Mirsad Bektic. Collard lost the fight via TKO in the third round.

Collard next faced Alex White on December 6, 2014 at UFC 181. Collard won the fight via unanimous decision.

Collard faced Gabriel Benítez on June 13, 2015 at UFC 188. He lost the fight by unanimous decision.

Collard was expected to face Andre Fili on September 5, 2015 at UFC 191. However, Fili was forced out of the bout with injury and replaced by Tiago Trator. Collard lost the fight by split decision and was subsequently released from the promotion.

Collard was expected to headline LFA 75 against Arthur Estrázulas on September 6, 2019 but withdrew from the bout due to a short notice call from the UFC. After four years away from UFC, Collard returned to the promotion and was scheduled to face Devonte Smith on August 17, 2019 at UFC 241 replacing John Makdessi. However, on the fight week news surfaced that Collard withdrew from the fight due to an undisclosed reason and was replaced by promotional newcomer Khama Worthy. Following the ordeal, Collard was released from the promotion again.

=== Professional Fighters League ===
In March 2020, Collard signed with Professional Fighters League and competes in the lightweight division. He was expected to participate in the season 2020 but due to COVID-19 pandemic the league cancelled the whole season.

==== 2021 season ====
Collard made his PFL debut against Anthony Pettis on April 23, 2021 at PFL 1. He won the bout via unanimous decision, out boxing Pettis throughout the bout.

Collard faced Joilton Lutterbach at PFL 4 on June 10, 2021. He won the bout via split decision.

Collard faced Raush Manfio in the semifinals of the Lightweight tournament on August 13, 2021 at PFL 7. Collard lost the bout via unanimous decision.

==== 2022 season ====
Collard faced Jeremy Stephens on April 20, 2022 at PFL 1. In a back and forth affair, Collard won the bout via unanimous decision.

Collard faced Alexander Martinez on June 17, 2022 at PFL 4. He lost the close bout via split decision.

==== 2023 season ====
Collard faced Yamato Nishikawa on April 14, 2023 at PFL 3. He won the fight via unanimous decision.

Collard faced Stevie Ray on June 23, 2023 at PFL 6. He won the fight via TKO in the second round.

Collard faced Shane Burgos in the semi-finals of the lightweight tournament on August 23, 2023, at PFL 9. He won the fight via unanimous decision.

In the final, Collard faced Olivier Aubin-Mercier on November 24, 2023 at PFL 10. He lost the fight by unanimous decision.

==== 2024 season ====
Collard faced former Bellator Featherweight champion A. J. McKee on February 24, 2024, at PFL vs. Bellator. He lost in the first round by armbar submission.

Collard started the 2024 season with a bout against former Bellator Lightweight champion Patricky Pitbull on April 12, 2024 at PFL 2. He won the fight by second round technical knockout.

Collard faced Mads Burnell in the main event of PFL 5 at Jon M. Huntsman Center in Salt Lake City, UT on June 21, 2024. He lost the fight via unanimous decision.

Collard faced former Bellator Lightweight champion Brent Primus in the semifinals of the 2024 Lightweight tournament on August 16, 2024 at PFL 8. He lost the fight by unanimous decision.

==== 2025 PFL World Tournament ====
On February 26, 2025, the promotion officially revealed that Collard joined the 2025 PFL Lightweight Tournament.

In the quarterfinal, Collard faced Alfie Davis on April 18, 2025, at PFL 3. He lost the bout by TKO in the first round.

== Professional boxing career ==
Collard was initially training boxing only to improve his offensive striking skills for mixed martial arts. However, he needed money to fix his car so he opted to take a short-notice professional boxing match. He made his professional boxing debut in 2017, winning via split decision.

== Bare-knuckle boxing ==
Collard made his debut with Bare Knuckle Fighting Championship against Daniel Keepers on August 8, 2026 at BKFC Fight Night 44. He won the fight by knockout in the third round.

Collard is scheduled to face Bryce Henry in the main event on December 11, 2026 at BKFC 97.

== Championships and accomplishments ==
- Showdown Fights
  - Showdown Fights Lightweight Championship (One time)
- SteelFist Fight Night
  - SteelFist Fight Night Lightweight Championship (One time)
    - One successful title defense
  - SteelFist Fight Night Welterweight Championship (One time)

== Mixed martial arts record ==
Professional record breakdown
41 matches	25 wins	15 losses
By knockout	12	2
By submission	3	4
By decision	10	9
No contests	1	

Res.	Record	Opponent	Method	Event	Date	Round	Time	Location	Notes
Loss	25–15 (1)	Alfie Davis	TKO (spinning back elbow and punches)	PFL 3 (2025)	April 18, 2025	1	2:12	Orlando, Florida, United States	2025 PFL Lightweight Tournament Quarterfinal.
Loss	25–14 (1)	Brent Primus	Decision (unanimous)	PFL 8 (2024)	August 16, 2024	3	5:00	Hollywood, Florida, United States	2024 PFL Lightweight Tournament Semifinal.
Loss	25–13 (1)	Mads Burnell	Decision (unanimous)	PFL 5 (2024)	June 21, 2024	3	5:00	Salt Lake City, Utah, United States	
Win	25–12 (1)	Patricky Pitbull	TKO (punches)	PFL 2 (2024)	April 12, 2024	2	1:32	Las Vegas, Nevada, United States	
Loss	24–12 (1)	A. J. McKee	Submission (armbar)	PFL vs. Bellator	February 24, 2024	1	1:10	Riyadh, Saudi Arabia	
Loss	24–11 (1)	Olivier Aubin-Mercier	Decision (unanimous)	PFL 10 (2023)	November 24, 2023	5	5:00	Washington, D.C., United States	2023 PFL Lightweight Tournament Final.
Win	24–10 (1)	Shane Burgos	Decision (unanimous)	PFL 9 (2023)	August 23, 2023	3	5:00	New York City, New York, United States	2023 PFL Lightweight Tournament Semifinal.
Win	23–10 (1)	Stevie Ray	TKO (punches)	PFL 6 (2023)	June 23, 2023	2	1:04	Atlanta, Georgia, United States	
Win	22–10 (1)	Yamato Nishikawa	Decision (unanimous)	PFL 3 (2023)	April 14, 2023	3	5:00	Las Vegas, Nevada, United States	
Loss	21–10 (1)	Alexander Martinez	Decision (split)	PFL 4 (2022)	June 17, 2022	3	5:00	Atlanta, Georgia, United States	
Win	21–9 (1)	Jeremy Stephens	Decision (unanimous)	PFL 1 (2022)	April 20, 2022	3	5:00	Arlington, Texas, United States	
Loss	20–9 (1)	Raush Manfio	Decision (unanimous)	PFL 7 (2021)	August 13, 2021	3	5:00	Hollywood, Florida, United States	2021 PFL Lightweight Tournament Semifinal.
Win	20–8 (1)	Joilton Lutterbach	Decision (split)	PFL 4 (2021)	June 10, 2021	3	5:00	Atlantic City, New Jersey, United States	Catchweight (159.4 lb) bout; Lutterbach missed weight.
Win	19–8 (1)	Anthony Pettis	Decision (unanimous)	PFL 1 (2021)	April 23, 2021	3	5:00	Atlantic City, New Jersey, United States	
Win	18–8 (1)	Randall Wallace	Decision (unanimous)	Final Fight Championship 35	April 19, 2019	3	5:00	Las Vegas, Nevada, United States	
Win	17–8 (1)	Lucas Montoya	TKO (punches)	SteelFist Fight Night: March Madness	March 22, 2019	1	3:30	Salt Lake City, Utah, United States	Defended the SFN Lightweight Championship.
Loss	16–8 (1)	Darrick Minner	Submission (rear-naked choke)	Final Fight Championship 33	November 2, 2018	1	0:32	Las Vegas, Nevada, United States	Return to Lightweight.
Win	16–7 (1)	Carson Gregory	Submission (triangle choke)	SteelFist Fight Night 57	April 13, 2018	2	3:07	Salt Lake City, Utah, United States	Welterweight debut. Won the SFN Welterweight Championship.
Win	15–7 (1)	Troy Dennison	TKO (punches)	SteelFist Fight Night 55	January 13, 2018	1	0:46	Salt Lake City, Utah, United States	Return to Lightweight. Won the vacant SFN Lightweight Championship.
Loss	14–7 (1)	Tiago Trator	Decision (split)	UFC 191	September 5, 2015	3	5:00	Las Vegas, Nevada, United States	
Loss	14–6 (1)	Gabriel Benítez	Decision (unanimous)	UFC 188	June 13, 2015	3	5:00	Mexico City, Mexico	
Win	14–5 (1)	Alex White	Decision (unanimous)	UFC 181	December 6, 2014	3	5:00	Las Vegas, Nevada, United States	
Loss	13–5 (1)	Max Holloway	TKO (punches)	UFC Fight Night: Henderson vs. dos Anjos	August 23, 2014	3	3:47	Tulsa, Oklahoma, United States	Catchweight (149 lb) bout.
Win	13–4 (1)	Nick Compton	Decision (unanimous)	Showdown Fights 14	June 28, 2014	3	5:00	Orem, Utah, United States	
Win	12–4 (1)	Jason Brenton	Decision (unanimous)	Showdown Fights 13	January 24, 2014	3	5:00	Orem, Utah, United States	Featherweight debut.
Win	11–4 (1)	Justin Buchholz	Decision (split)	Showdown Fights 12	September 28, 2013	5	5:00	Orem, Utah, United States	Won the Showdown Fights Lightweight Championship.
NC	10–4 (1)	Jordan Clements	NC (overturned)	Showdown Fights 10	February 8, 2013	2	2:08	Orem, Utah, United States	Originally a TKO (corner stoppage) win for Collard; overturned after he tested positive for banned substances.
Win	10–4	Steve Sharp	TKO (punches)	Showdown Fights 9	November 16, 2012	2	4:44	Orem, Utah, United States	
Loss	9–4	Justin Buchholz	Submission (guillotine choke)	Showdown Fights 8	August 25, 2012	3	1:35	Orem, Utah, United States	
Win	9–3	Steve Walser	TKO (punches)	Showdown Fights 7	May 4, 2012	1	0:44	Orem, Utah, United States	
Win	8–3	Scott Casey	Submission (rear-naked choke)	Rocky Mountain FC 3	March 24, 2012	1	4:36	Vernal, Utah, United States	
Win	7–3	Dustin Collins	TKO (retirement)	Rocky Mountain FC 2	January 14, 2012	1	5:00	Vernal, Utah, United States	
Win	6–3	Luke Pierce	TKO (punches)	Flash Academy MMA: Fight Night Explosion	November 26, 2011	1	2:47	Price, Utah, United States	
Win	5–3	Drayton Woods	Submission (rear-naked choke)	Crown FC 4	October 29, 2011	1	3:07	St. George, Utah, United States	
Loss	4–3	David Castillo	Decision (unanimous)	Jeremy Horn's Elite Fight Night 14	September 30, 2011	3	5:00	Lehi, Utah, United States	
Loss	4–2	Oliver Parker	Decision (unanimous)	Moab Combat Sports: Red Rock Rumble 4	September 24, 2011	3	5:00	Moab, Utah, United States	
Win	4–1	Kyle Herrera	TKO (corner stoppage)	Fight King: Fight for the Cops	August 17, 2011	3	1:54	Salt Lake City, Utah, United States	
Loss	3–1	Jose Salgado	Submission (rear-naked choke)	Crown FC 3	June 18, 2011	2	2:38	St. George, Utah, United States	
Win	3–0	Kevin Hamby Jacobson	TKO (punches)	Flash Academy MMA: Mayhem & Motocross MMA Fight Night	May 14, 2011	1	1:10	Price, Utah, United States	
Win	2–0	Kaifah Detoles	TKO (punches)	Fight Kings 7	April 2, 2011	2	2:02	Vernal, Utah, United States	
Win	1–0	Daniel Ruiz	TKO (punches)	Moab Combat Sports: Red Rock Rumble 3	March 26, 2011	1	2:11	Moab, Utah, United States	Lightweight debut.

== Professional boxing record ==
18 fights	9 wins	6 losses
By knockout	4	2
By decision	5	4
Draws	3	

No.	Result	Record	Opponent	Type	Round, time	Date	Location	Notes
18	Loss	9–6–3	Yoelvis Gomez	TKO	1 (6), 2:11	Dec 25, 2021	Prudential Center, Newark, New Jersey, U.S.	
17	Loss	9–5–3	Damian Sosa	UD	8	Dec 4, 2021	Civc Auditorium, Stockton, California, U.S.	
16	Loss	9–4–3	Maidel Sando	UD	6	Feb 20, 2021	Shelby Co Fairgrounds, Shelbyville, Kentucky, U.S.	
15	Loss	9–3–3	Quincy LaVallais	UD	8	Dec 12, 2020	MGM Grand Conference Center, Paradise, Nevada, U.S.	
14	Win	9–2–3	Maurice Williams	TKO	2 (8), 1:32	Aug 22, 2020	MGM Grand Conference Center, Paradise, Nevada, U.S.	
13	Win	8–2–3	Lorawnt T. Nelson	TKO	2 (6), 1:57	Jul 14, 2020	MGM Grand Conference Center, Paradise, Nevada, U.S.	
12	Win	7–2–3	David Kaminsky	SD	6	Jun 18, 2020	MGM Grand Conference Center, Paradise, Nevada, U.S.	
11	Win	6–2–3	Raymond Guajardo	TKO	2 (6), 1:42	Feb 1, 2020	Beau Rivage, Biloxi, Mississippi, U.S.	
10	Win	5–2–3	Quashawn Toler	UD	6	Jan 3, 2020	Blue Note, Cincinnati, Ohio, U.S.	
9	Loss	4–2–3	Bektemir Melikuziev	TKO	4 (8), 2:22	Nov 2, 2019	MGM Grand Garden Arena, Paradise, Nevada, U.S.	
8	Win	4–1–3	Gerald Sherrell	UD	6	Sep 21, 2019	The Meadows Racetrack and Casino, Washington, Pennsylvania, U.S.	
7	Win	3–1–3	Dushane Crooks	TKO	3 (6), 2:59	Sep 6, 2019	The Sugar Mill, New Orleans, Louisiana, U.S.	
6	Win	2–1–3	Maurice Winslow III	SD	4	Jul 6, 2019	SeaGate Convention Centre, Toledo, Ohio, U.S.	
5	Draw	1–1–3	Quincy LaVallais	SD	6	Jun 29, 2019	Harrah's New Orleans, New Orleans, Louisiana, U.S.	
4	Draw	1–1–2	Emilio Carlos Rodriquez	MD	4	Jun 21, 2019	Fantasy Springs Resort Casino, Indio, California, U.S.	
3	Loss	1–1–1	Quinton Randall	UD	4	Jun 1, 2019	Arabia Shrine Center, Houston, Texas, U.S.	
2	Draw	1–0–1	Tipton Walker	MD	6	May 18, 2019	Performance Arts Center, Dearborn, Michigan, U.S.	
1	Win	1–0	Jamey Swanson	SD	4	Jun 9, 2017	Complex Arena, Salt Lake City, Utah, U.S.	

== Bare-knuckle boxing record ==
Professional record breakdown
1 match	0 wins	1 loss
By knockout	0	1

Res.	Record	Opponent	Method	Event	Date	Round	Time	Location	Notes
Win	1–0	Daniel Keepers	KO	BKFC Fight Night Sturgis: Acheson vs. Jones	August 8, 2026	3	1:42	Sturgis, South Dakota, United States	

== See also ==
- List of male mixed martial artists
