= UFC 191 =

UFC mixed martial arts event in 2015

UFC 191: Johnson vs Dodson 2
- The poster for UFC 191: Johnson vs Dodson 2
- Promotion: Ultimate Fighting Championship
- Date: September 5, 2015
- Venue: MGM Grand Garden Arena
- City: Las Vegas, Nevada
- Attendance: 10,873
- Total gate: $1,362,700
- Buyrate: 115,000

Event chronology
UFC Fight Night: Holloway vs. Oliveira	UFC 191: Johnson vs Dodson 2	UFC Fight Night: Barnett vs. Nelson

UFC 191: Johnson vs. Dodson 2 was a mixed martial arts event held on September 5, 2015, at the MGM Grand Garden Arena in Las Vegas, Nevada.

== Background ==
Initially, a UFC Light Heavyweight Championship bout between current champion Daniel Cormier and top contender Alexander Gustafsson was linked as a possible event headliner. Although never officially announced by the UFC, the bout between Cormier and Gustafsson would not take place at this event and would instead be postponed and moved to UFC 192.

During the live Fox Sports 1 broadcast of UFC Fight Night: Mir vs. Duffee, it was confirmed that a UFC Flyweight Championship bout between current champion Demetrious Johnson and top contender John Dodson would headline the event. Their first fight at UFC on Fox: Johnson vs. Dodson ended in a unanimous decision victory for Johnson.

The co-main event featured a heavyweight bout between former UFC Heavyweight champions Andrei Arlovski and Frank Mir.

Anthony Johnson was originally expected to face Jan Błachowicz on the card. However, Johnson was pulled from the bout on July 30 in favor of a fight with Jimi Manuwa at the event. In turn, Błachowicz faced The Ultimate Fighter 19 light heavyweight winner Corey Anderson.

Raquel Pennington was initially expected to face Leslie Smith at UFC 192. However, Smith was forced to pull out of the event due to injury. Subsequently, Pennington was pulled from the card entirely in favor of a bout with former title challenger Liz Carmouche at this event. In turn, Carmouche pulled out of the fight just days after being added, citing injury and was replaced by Jéssica Andrade. This fight was a rematch, as Andrade beat Pennington via split decision at UFC 171.

Andre Fili was expected to face Clay Collard at the event. However, less than one week after the bout was announced, Fili was forced out of the bout with an injury and was replaced by Tiago Trator.

== Results ==
Main Card
Weight class				Method	Round	Time	Notes
Flyweight	Demetrious Johnson (c)	def.	John Dodson	Decision (unanimous) (49–46, 49–46, 50–45)	5	5:00	(Note: For the UFC Flyweight Championship.)
Heavyweight	Andrei Arlovski	def.	Frank Mir	Decision (unanimous) (29–28, 29–28, 30–27)	3	5:00
Light Heavyweight	Anthony Johnson	def.	Jimi Manuwa	KO (punches)	2	0:28
Light Heavyweight	Corey Anderson	def.	Jan Błachowicz	Decision (unanimous) (30–25, 30–25, 29–26)	3	5:00
Women's Strawweight	Paige VanZant	def.	Alex Chambers	Submission (armbar)	3	1:01
Preliminary Card (Fox Sports 1)
Lightweight	Ross Pearson	def.	Paul Felder	Decision (split) (28–29, 30–27, 29–28)	3	5:00
Bantamweight	John Lineker	def.	Francisco Rivera	Submission (guillotine choke)	1	2:08
Women's Bantamweight	Raquel Pennington	def.	Jéssica Andrade	Submission (rear-naked choke)	2	4:58
Featherweight	Tiago Trator	def.	Clay Collard	Decision (split) (29–28, 28–29, 29–28)	3	5:00
Preliminary Card (UFC Fight Pass)
Middleweight	Joe Riggs	def.	Ron Stallings	Disqualification (illegal upkick)	2	2:28
Lightweight	Joaquim Silva	def.	Nazareno Malegarie	Decision (split) (28–29, 30–27, 30–27)	3	5:00

== Reported payout ==
The following is the reported payout to the fighters as reported to the Nevada State Athletic Commission. It does not include sponsor money and also does not include the UFC's traditional "fight night" bonuses.

- Demetrious Johnson: $191,000 (includes $58,000 win bonus) def. John Dodson: $60,000
- Andrei Arlovski: $225,000 (no win bonus) def. Frank Mir: $200,000
- Anthony Johnson: $230,000 (includes $115,000 win bonus) def. Jimi Manuwa: $24,000
- Corey Anderson: $30,000 (includes $15,000 win bonus) def. Jan Błachowicz: $34,000
- Paige VanZant: $24,000 (includes $12,000 win bonus) def. Alex Chambers: $12,000
- Ross Pearson: $90,000 (includes $45,000 win bonus) def. Paul Felder: $18,000
- John Lineker: $48,000 (includes $24,000 win bonus) def. Francisco Rivera: $23,000
- Raquel Pennington: $20,000 (includes $10,000 win bonus) def. Jéssica Andrade: $20,000
- Tiago Trator: $20,000 (includes $10,000 win bonus) def. Clay Collard: $10,000
- Joe Riggs: $32,000 (includes $16,000 win bonus) def. Ronald Stallings: $12,000
- Joaquim Silva: $20,000 (includes $10,000 win bonus) def. Nazareno Malegarie: $10,000

== Bonus awards ==
The following fighters were awarded $50,000 bonuses:

- Fight of the Night: John Lineker vs. Francisco Rivera
- Performance of the Night: Anthony Johnson and Raquel Pennington

== See also ==
- List of UFC events
- 2015 in UFC
