= UFC on Fox: Lawler vs. Brown =

UFC mixed martial arts event in 2014

UFC on Fox: Lawler vs Brown
- The poster for UFC on Fox: Lawler vs Brown
- Promotion: Ultimate Fighting Championship
- Date: July 26, 2014
- Venue: SAP Center
- City: San Jose, California
- Attendance: 11,482
- Total gate: $735,317

Event chronology
UFC Fight Night: McGregor vs. Brandao	UFC on Fox: Lawler vs Brown	UFC 176: Aldo vs. Mendes II

UFC on Fox: Lawler vs. Brown (also known as UFC on Fox 12) was a mixed martial arts event held on July 26, 2014, at SAP Center in San Jose, California.

== Background ==
The event was headlined by a welterweight bout between Matt Brown and Robbie Lawler. UFC president Dana White subsequently announced that the winner of the main event would receive a title shot against UFC welterweight champion Johny Hendricks.

Viscardi Andrade was briefly scheduled to face Andreas Ståhl at the event. However, Andrade was replaced on the card by promotional newcomer Gilbert Burns.

Michael Johnson was expected to face Josh Thomson at the event. However, on July 11, Johnson pulled out of the bout and was replaced by Bobby Green.

Due to programming needs, the televised preliminaries were shifted to Fox instead of being aired on Fox Sports 1 or Fox Sports 2.

During weigh-ins, both Brown and Lima missed weight for their fights against Lawler and Jędrzejczyk, respectively. They were supposed to be fined 20% of their salary (10% to their opponent and 10% to the commission), but both fighters were not fined due to a commission error. Brown weighed in at 172.5 lb but was not allowed by the California State Athletic Commission to weigh in again, while Lima initially came in at 117 lb and only dropped to 116.5 lb and she was also denied another try. Both remained eligible for the UFC's post-fight bonus awards.

This event also marks the debuts of former UFC Strawweight Champion Joanna Jędrzejczyk and UFC Featherweight Championship Challenger Brian Ortega.

== Results ==
Main Card (Fox)
Weight class				Method	Round	Time	Notes
Catchweight (172.5 lb)	Robbie Lawler	def.	Matt Brown	Decision (unanimous) (49–46, 49–46, 48–47)	5	5:00	(Note: UFC Welterweight Championship title eliminator.)
Light Heavyweight	Anthony Johnson	def.	Antônio Rogério Nogueira	KO (punches)	1	0:44
Featherweight	Dennis Bermudez	def.	Clay Guida	Submission (rear-naked choke)	2	2:57
Lightweight	Bobby Green	def.	Josh Thomson	Decision (split) (29–28, 28–29, 29–28)	3	5:00
Preliminary card (Fox)
Lightweight	Jorge Masvidal	def.	Daron Cruickshank	Decision (unanimous) (29–28, 29–28, 29–27)	3	5:00
Light Heavyweight	Patrick Cummins	def.	Kyle Kingsbury	Decision (unanimous) (30–27, 30–25, 30–24)	3	5:00
Welterweight	Tim Means	def.	Hernani Perpétuo	Decision (unanimous) (29–28, 29–28, 29–28)	3	5:00
Featherweight	Brian Ortega	vs.	Mike De La Torre	No Contest (overturned)	1	1:39	(Note: Originally a Submission (rear-naked choke) victory for Ortega, the result was changed to "No Contest" after Ortega tested positive for drostanolone during a post fight screening.)
Preliminary card (UFC Fight Pass)
Lightweight	Tiago Trator	def.	Akbarh Arreola	Decision (unanimous) (29–28, 30–27, 30–27)	3	5:00
Welterweight	Gilbert Burns	def.	Andreas Ståhl	Decision (unanimous) (29–28, 29–28, 29–28)	3	5:00
Catchweight (116.5 lb)	Joanna Jędrzejczyk	def.	Juliana Lima	Decision (unanimous) (30–27, 29–28, 30–27)	3	5:00
Featherweight	Noad Lahat	def.	Steven Siler	Decision (unanimous) (29–28, 29–28, 29–28)	3	5:00

== Bonus awards ==
The following fighters received $50,000 bonuses:

- Fight of the Night: Robbie Lawler vs. Matt Brown
- Performance of the Night: Anthony Johnson and Dennis Bermudez

== Reported payout ==
The following is the reported payout to the fighters as reported to the California State Athletic Commission. It does not include sponsor money or "locker room" bonuses often given by the UFC and also do not include the UFC's traditional "fight night" bonuses.

- Robbie Lawler: $210,000 ($105,000 win bonus) def. Matt Brown: $46,000
- Anthony Johnson: $106,000 ($53,000 win bonus) def. Antônio Rogério Nogueira: $114,000
- Dennis Bermudez: $48,000 ($24,000 win bonus) def. Clay Guida: $50,000
- Bobby Green: $42,000 ($21,000 win bonus) def. Josh Thomson: $84,000
- Jorge Masvidal: $84,000 ($42,000 win bonus) def. Daron Cruickshank: $12,000
- Patrick Cummins: $20,000 ($10,000 win bonus) def. Kyle Kingsbury: $15,000
- Tim Means: $20,000 ($10,000 win bonus) def. Hernani Perpétuo: $8,000
- Brian Ortega: $16,000 ($8,000 win bonus) def. Mike De La Torre: $8,000
- Tiago Trator: $16,000 ($8,000 win bonus) def. Akbarh Arreola: $8,000
- Gilbert Burns: $16,000 ($8,000 win bonus) def. Andreas Ståhl: $8,000
- Joanna Jędrzejczyk: $16,000 ($8,000 win bonus) def. Juliana Lima: $8,000
- Noad Lahat: $16,000 ($8,000 win bonus) def. Steven Siler: $15,000

== See also ==
- List of UFC events
- 2014 in UFC
