= Dan Quinn (fighter) =

American mixed martial arts (MMA) fighter (born 1967)

Daniel Matthew Quinn
- Born: June 23, 1967 (age 59); San Diego, California, U.S.
- Other names: Saint of Stevia
- Height: 6 ft 3 in (191 cm)
- Weight: 205 lb (93 kg; 14 st 9 lb)
- Division: Super Heavyweight; Heavyweight; Light Heavyweight
- Stance: Orthodox
- Fighting out of: Sacramento, California, United States
- Team: Team Quinn; The Arena; Team Carnage (formerly)
- Years active: 1998–2002, 2004–2012, 2015

Mixed martial arts record
- Total: 12
- Wins: 5
- By knockout: 3
- By submission: 1
- By decision: 1
- Losses: 6
- By knockout: 4
- By submission: 1
- By decision: 1
- Draws: 1

Other information
- Mixed martial arts record from Sherdog

Dan Quinn (born June 23, 1967) is a retired American professional mixed martial artist, boxer, and former collegiate football player. Quinn is notable for his advocacy of stevia as a performance-enhancing substance and fat burner.

== Education ==
Quinn graduated from San Dieguito High School in 1985. Quinn attended the University of Notre Dame from 1986 to 1987 as a recruit and would be a student at San Diego State University numerous times in the transpiring years.

== Football ==
Quinn played football at Notre Dame at the inside linebacker position and occasionally special teams as a tackling specialist. While attending the school, he was involved in a bitter feud with Hall of Fame coach Lou Holtz and starter Frank Stams. Quinn alleged that Holtz assaulted players and engaged in illegal point shaving by not allowing him more time on the field to make "spectacular fucking plays".

Notre Dame students held an annual benefit boxing event known as Bengal Bouts on March 7, 1986, with he proceeds going towards the Holy Cross Missions of Bangladesh. Quinn took part in a super heavyweight match against fellow football player Parnell Taylor. Quinn emerged victorious in a split-decision. The following year, the two met in a rematch with Taylor coming out on top in a unanimous decision.

In April 1987, Holtz suspended Quinn and four of his teammates and barred them from participating in upcoming practice drills. Holtz did not give a reason for the suspension, but did say, "they're not bad kids, they just made a bad decision".

== Arrests ==
On November 27, 1991 Quinn was charged on two counts of battery. He was later dismissed in court on both counts.

On February 17, 1993 Dan Quinn was charged with one felony count of possession of a controlled substance and on one misdemeanor count of concealable weapon possession.

On March 16, 1993 Quinn pleaded guilty to the misdemeanor count and was sentenced to a 1-year informal probation, and served 15 days in custody.

On November 3, 1993 Quinn's felony charge was later dismissed after time served.

On February 25, 1997 Dan Quinn was charged with marijuana possession (less than 2 grams), and possession of a controlled substance (methamphetamines), he later pleaded guilty to possession of a controlled substance, and was sentenced to three years of supervised probation under the Sheriff's Work Program in Sacramento. He also spent two months in custody.

On June 2, 1998 Quinn was charged with two misdemeanor counts of assault (an unlawful attempt, coupled with a present ability to commit a violent injury on another person). He later spent ten days in custody for violating his parole and the charges were dismissed.

On February 16, 1999 Dan Quinn was charged with two felony counts. One for concealable weapons charge and another for evading a police officer. A month later Quinn was sentenced to a five-year formal probation in a work furlough program, which was downgraded to Sheriff's Work Program on June 4, 1999; and spent five months in state jail.

On March 2, 2000 Quinn was charged with domestic violence/spousal abuse. The charge was later dismissed.

On March 23, 2004 Dan Quinn was again charged with one felony count of domestic violence/spousal abuse and one count for willfully threatening to commit a crime which will result in death or great bodily injury of an immediate family member. He was later sentenced to three years probation and served 79 days in a minimum security prison that held inmates under different work programs within Southern California.

Quinn was arrested on August 9, 2012 on the charges of possession of a firearm by a felon and of making death threats. After numerous postponements, Dan was ultimately found "incompetent" to stand trial. On January 3, 2014 Dan was "committed to a state hospital". On March 12, 2014, he was returned to the Sacramento County Jail. Quinn "retained counsel" on June 12, 2014. Quinn was released from jail on August 7, 2014.

== Mixed martial arts career ==
After three years away from fighting sports, Quinn decided to try his hand at mixed martial arts. In his second fight, he lost to future UFC World Heavyweight champion Frank Mir.

Other notable bouts Quinn had were his fight against UFC star Jason Lambert, in which Lambert avoided engagement and won via decision, and a fight against K-1 striker Carter Williams, who controversially defeated Quinn by TKO via illegal low kick. Although he was locked deep in a keylock, Quinn refused to submit against Dan Molina, ultimately forcing the referee to end the fight in favor of Molina. Quinn then went on hiatus from MMA for four years.

In his return fight, Quinn KO'd Muay Thai/X-Arm fighter Bond Lapua, who outweighed him by fifty pounds. Quinn next fought Harry Gopaul, questionably losing via KO when the second round went 15 seconds over the scheduled duration. Quinn next fought Aaron Brink who won via TKO to strikes, after this fight Quinn and Brink became close friends, and even invited Dan to occasionally train at The Arena MMA gym, host to many current and former UFC fighters including Diego Sanchez and Brink himself. Quinn most recently suffered a loss at the hands of Rick Vardell.

== Boxing ==
After leaving Notre Dame, Quinn turned to boxing before transitioning to mixed martial arts. He was a multi time champion in the annual Bengal Bouts and also traveled to Florida in 1998 to win a Golden Gloves Heavyweight 8-man single night tournament.

Result	Opponent	Method	Event	Date	Round, Time	Notes
Draw	(United States) Joe Gray	Draw	Arco Arena, Sacramento, California, United States	1998-08-20	4 – 3:00	

== Mixed martial arts record ==
Professional record breakdown
12 matches	5 wins	6 losses
By knockout	3	4
By submission	1	1
By decision	1	1
Draws	1	

Res.	Record	Opponent	Method	Event	Date	Round	Time	Location	Notes
Loss	5–6–1	(United States) Rick Vardell	TKO (strikes)	Gladiator Challenge: Impulse	November 13, 2010	2	1:43	Placerville, California, United States	For Gladiator Challenge Super Heavyweight Championship.
Loss	5–5–1	(United States) Aaron Brink	TKO (doctor stoppage)	Gladiator Challenge: Fahrenheit	August 20, 2010	2	0:22	San Jacinto, California, United States	
Loss	5–4–1	(United States) Harry Gopaul	TKO (punches)	Gladiator Challenge: Chain Reaction	December 12, 2009	2	2:25	Placerville, California, United States	
Win	5–3–1	(Tonga) Bond Lapua	TKO (punches)	Gladiator Challenge: First Strike	October 10, 2009	1	1:49	Placerville, California, United States	
Loss	4–3–1	(United States) Dan Molina	TKO (corner stoppage)	Gladiator Challenge 34: Legends Collide	January 27, 2005	1	4:39	Colusa, California, United States	
Win	4–2–1	(United States) Mike Macgregor	TKO (doctor stoppage)	Gladiator Challenge 27: Fightfest 2	June 3, 2004	1	4:08	Colusa, California, United States	
Win	3–2–1	(Mexico) Adrian Perez	Submission (guillotine choke)	Gladiator Challenge 22	February 12, 2004	1	2:18	Colusa, California, United States	
Loss	2–2–1	(United States) Jason Lambert	Decision (unanimous)	Gladiator Challenge 12	September 8, 2002	3	5:00	Colusa, California, United States	
Win	2–1–1	(United States) Rick Vardell	TKO (strikes)	Gladiator Challenge 9	February 10, 2002	1	4:57	Colusa, California, United States	
Draw	1–1–1	(United States) Kevin Tolai	Draw	Gladiator Challenge 7: Casualties of War	November 4, 2001	2	5:00	Colusa, California, United States	
Loss	1–1	(United States) Frank Mir	Submission (triangle choke)	IFC: Warriors Challenge 15	August 31, 2001	1	2:15	Oroville, California, United States	
Win	1–0	(United States) Tosh Cook	Decision	IFC: Warriors Challenge 13	June 15, 2001	3	5:00	Oroville, California, United States	
