= Myles Jury =

American mixed martial artist (born 1988)

- Born: Myles Madison Jury; October 31, 1988 (age 37); Hazel Park, Michigan, US
- Other names: Fury
- Height: 5 ft 11 in (1.80 m)
- Weight: 156 lb (71 kg; 11.1 st)
- Division: Featherweight (2017–2019); Lightweight (2008–2015, 2019–present)
- Reach: 73 in (185 cm)
- Fighting out of: San Diego, California, United States
- Team: Alliance MMA; Fuse MMA (formerly)
- Rank: Black belt in Brazilian Jiu-Jitsu under Carlos "Caique" Elias & Don Richard
- Years active: 2005–present

Mixed martial arts record
- Total: 25
- Wins: 19
- By knockout: 8
- By submission: 5
- By decision: 6
- Losses: 6
- By knockout: 1
- By submission: 2
- By decision: 3

Amateur record
- Total: 6
- Wins: 6
- By knockout: 3
- By submission: 3
- Losses: 0

Other information
- Mixed martial arts record from Sherdog

Myles Madison Jury (born October 31, 1988) is an American mixed martial artist, who competes in the Lightweight division. He has most notably fought for Ultimate Fighting Championship (UFC) and Bellator MMA. He is a Black Belt in Brazilian Jiu-Jitsu.

== Background ==
Jury was born in Hazel Park, Michigan and was raised in a broken home, as his parents divorced when he was two years old causing Jury to live with his father who was a roofer. Jury began wrestling in the seventh grade at Beecher Junior High in Hazel Park, MI and demonstrated his grappling talents early, going 12–2 in his first year. Jury then began training in Brazilian jiu-jitsu at the age of 13, being taken under the wing of Professor Don Richard. From there, Jury transitioned into MMA when he was 14 and had his first fight when he was 15. Jury later moved to nearby Fenton, Michigan with his mother and step-father, a mechanic. Jury attended Fenton High School, where he won the district championship and received All-State honors in his senior year. Jury then attended Oakland Community College, but stopped to focus more on training.

== Mixed martial arts career ==
=== Early career ===
Jury made his professional MMA debut in October 2005. Prior to appearing on The Ultimate Fighter, he competed primarily for the King of the Cage promotion in California. In his first five years as a fighter he amassed a record of 9–0, with all of his wins coming in the first round. Fury earned his black belt in Brazilian jiu-jitsu under Professor Don Richard (who is a black belt under Master Caique). From there he started his own MMA Affiliate system teaching wrestling, striking, and jiu-jitsu for MMA; Jury Jiu Jitsu.

=== The Ultimate Fighter ===
Myles Jury had two stints on the Ultimate Fighter. His first stint was on TUF 13, when he tore his ACL in the first episode and was sidelined for a year without being able to train. But he was able to compete on TUF 15 as was one of the 32 Lightweight fighters announced by the UFC to participate in the first live season of The Ultimate Fighter reality show.

Jury won his fight to get in the house, then was selected to fight Al Iaquinta and was defeated by split decision after three rounds, which won fight of the season.

=== Ultimate Fighting Championship ===
Jury officially made his UFC debut at The Ultimate Fighter 15 Finale on June 1, 2012, against Chris Saunders. He won the fight via submission in the first round.

Jury next fought Michael Johnson on December 29, 2012, at UFC 155. Jury dominated Johnson for all three rounds to earn a unanimous decision.

Jury faced Ramsey Nijem on April 20, 2013, at UFC on Fox 7. He won the fight via one punch knockout in the second round.

Jury faced Mike Ricci on September 21, 2013, at UFC 165. Jury won the fight via split decision.

For his fifth UFC fight, Jury faced Diego Sanchez on March 15, 2014, at UFC 171. He won the fight via unanimous decision.

Jury was expected to face Abel Trujillo on June 28, 2014, at UFC Fight Night 44. However, Jury pulled out of the bout citing an injury and Trujillo was pulled for the event as well.

Jury next faced Takanori Gomi on September 20, 2014, at UFC Fight Night 52. He won the fight via TKO in the first round.

Jury faced Donald Cerrone on January 3, 2015, at UFC 182. He lost the one sided fight via unanimous decision.

Jury was expected to face Anthony Pettis on July 25, 2015, at UFC on Fox 16. However, Pettis pulled out of the bout on May 8 and was replaced by Edson Barboza. Subsequently, Jury pulled out of the fight citing injury and was replaced by Paul Felder.

For his next bout, Jury moved to the featherweight division to face Charles Oliveira on December 19, 2015, at UFC on Fox 17. In the lead up to the fight Oliveira missed weight for the bout and it was subsequently contested at a catchweight. Oliveira won the fight via submission in the first round.

Jury faced Mike De La Torre on April 8, 2017, at UFC 210. He won the fight via TKO in the first round.

Jury faced Ricky Glenn on December 30, 2017, at UFC 219. He won the fight by unanimous decision.

Jury faced Chad Mendes on July 14, 2018, at UFC Fight Night 133. He lost the fight via TKO in the first round.

Jury faced Andre Fili on February 17, 2019, at UFC on ESPN 1. He lost the fight by unanimous decision.

=== Bellator MMA ===
On July 18, 2019, it was announced that Jury had signed a four-fight deal with Bellator MMA. Jury made his promotional debut against Benson Henderson in Jury's return to Lightweight at Bellator 227 on September 27, 2019. He lost the fight by unanimous decision.

Jury faced Brandon Girtz on February 21, 2020, at Bellator 239. He won the fight by unanimous decision.

Jury faced Georgi Karakhanyan on August 7, 2020, at Bellator 243. He won the fight via split decision.

Jury faced Sidney Outlaw at Bellator 261 on June 25, 2021. After being dominated by Outlaw on the ground, Jury lost the bout rear-naked choke in the third round.

== Personal life ==
Jury is known for investing in real estate, and runs a YouTube channel where he talks about his experiences in MMA and investing. He has provided detailed breakdowns of the finances of UFC fighters, including their revenue streams (direct pay, win bonus, locker room bonus) and sponsorships.

== Championships and accomplishments ==
- Ultimate Fighting Championship
  - UFC.com Awards
    - 2012: Ranked #7 Newcomer of the Year

== Mixed martial arts record ==
Professional record breakdown
25 matches	19 wins	6 losses
By knockout	10	1
By submission	3	2
By decision	6	3

Res.	Record	Opponent	Method	Event	Date	Round	Time	Location	Notes
Loss	19–6	Sidney Outlaw	Submission (rear-naked choke)	Bellator 261	June 25, 2021	3	4:44	Uncasville, Connecticut, United States	
Win	19–5	Georgi Karakhanyan	Decision (split)	Bellator 243	August 7, 2020	3	5:00	Uncasville, Connecticut	
Win	18–5	Brandon Girtz	Decision (unanimous)	Bellator 239	February 21, 2020	3	5:00	Thackerville, Oklahoma	
Loss	17–5	Benson Henderson	Decision (unanimous)	Bellator 227	September 27, 2019	3	5:00	Dublin, Ireland	Return to Lightweight.
Loss	17–4	Andre Fili	Decision (unanimous)	UFC on ESPN: Ngannou vs. Velasquez	February 17, 2019	3	5:00	Phoenix, Arizona, United States	
Loss	17–3	Chad Mendes	TKO (punches)	UFC Fight Night: dos Santos vs. Ivanov	July 14, 2018	1	2:52	Boise, Idaho, United States	
Win	17–2	Ricky Glenn	Decision (unanimous)	UFC 219	December 30, 2017	3	5:00	Las Vegas, Nevada, United States	
Win	16–2	Mike De La Torre	TKO (elbows and punches)	UFC 210	April 8, 2017	1	3:30	Buffalo, New York, United States	
Loss	15–2	Charles Oliveira	Submission (guillotine choke)	UFC on Fox: dos Anjos vs. Cowboy 2	December 19, 2015	1	3:05	Orlando, Florida, United States	Featherweight debut; Oliveira missed weight (150.5 lb).
Loss	15–1	Donald Cerrone	Decision (unanimous)	UFC 182	January 3, 2015	3	5:00	Las Vegas, Nevada, United States	
Win	15–0	Takanori Gomi	TKO (punches)	UFC Fight Night: Hunt vs. Nelson	September 20, 2014	1	1:32	Saitama, Japan	
Win	14–0	Diego Sanchez	Decision (unanimous)	UFC 171	March 15, 2014	3	5:00	Dallas, Texas, United States	
Win	13–0	Mike Ricci	Decision (split)	UFC 165	September 21, 2013	3	5:00	Toronto, Ontario, Canada	
Win	12–0	Ramsey Nijem	KO (punch)	UFC on Fox: Henderson vs. Melendez	April 20, 2013	2	1:02	San Jose, California, United States	
Win	11–0	Michael Johnson	Decision (unanimous)	UFC 155	December 29, 2012	3	5:00	Las Vegas, Nevada, United States	
Win	10–0	Chris Saunders	Submission (guillotine choke)	The Ultimate Fighter: Live Finale	June 1, 2012	1	4:03	Las Vegas, Nevada, United States	
Win	9–0	Sam Oropeza	Submission (standing rear-naked choke)	KOTC: No Mercy	September 17, 2010	1	2:55	Mashantucket, Connecticut, United States	
Win	8–0	David Herlein	TKO (punches)	XCC: Rumble in Royal Oak 5	January 16, 2010	1	0:48	Royal Oak, Michigan, United States	
Win	7–0	Garrett Olson	Submission (armbar)	KOTC: Strike Point	October 10, 2009	1	1:09	Lac du Flambeau, Wisconsin, United States	
Win	6–0	Tyrone Holmes	TKO (punches)	KOTC: Encore	June 19, 2009	1	2:20	Mount Pleasant, Michigan, United States	
Win	5–0	Karl Kelly	Submission (punches)	KOTC: Insanity	April 4, 2009	1	0:20	Lac du Flambeau, Wisconsin, United States	
Win	4–0	Marcus Ajian	Submission (punches)	KOTC: Anticipation	November 26, 2008	1	0:49	Mount Pleasant, Michigan, United States	
Win	3–0	Darrell Mitchell	TKO (elbows)	KOTC: Level One	October 18, 2008	1	0:57	Lac du Flambeau, Wisconsin, United States	
Win	2–0	Joshua Taibl	TKO (punches)	KOTC: Settlement	June 13, 2008	1	1:20	Mount Pleasant, Michigan, United States	
Win	1–0	Brad Johnson	KO (head kick)	MFL: Michigan Fight League	February 15, 2008	1	0:12	Mishawaka, Indiana, United States	

=== Mixed martial arts exhibition record ===
Exhibition record breakdown		
2 matches	1 win	1 loss
By decision	1	1

Res.	Record	Opponent	Method	Event	Date	Round	Time	Location	Notes
Loss	1–1	Al Iaquinta	Decision (split)	The Ultimate Fighter: Live	March 30, 2012 (airdate)	3	5:00	Las Vegas, Nevada, United States	The Ultimate Fighter: Live Preliminary round; Fight of the season
Win	1–0	Akbarh Arreola	Decision (unanimous)	The Ultimate Fighter: Live	March 9, 2012 (airdate)	1	5:00	Las Vegas, Nevada, United States	The Ultimate Fighter: Live Elimination round

=== Mixed martial arts amateur record ===
Amateur record breakdown		
6 matches	6 wins	0 losses
By knockout	3	0
By submission	3	0

Res.	Record	Opponent	Method	Event	Date	Round	Time	Location	Notes
Win	6–0	Joel Roberts	KO (punches)	KOTC: Bad Boys	November 21, 2007	1	1:35	Mount Pleasant, Michigan, United States	
Win	5–0	Paul Robert Martin	KO (punch)	KOTC: Explosion	June 15, 2007	1	0:31	Mount Pleasant, Michigan, United States	
Win	4–0	Scott Bickerstaff	TKO (punches)	KOTC: Mass Destruction	January 26, 2007	1	N/A	Mount Pleasant, Michigan, United States	
Win	3–0	Mikey Bennett	Submission (rear-naked choke)	KOTC: Meltdown	October 7, 2006	1	1:45	Indianapolis, Indiana, United States	
Win	2–0	Dan Loman	Submission (rear-naked choke)	Shooto: Battle of the Belts	May 19, 2006	2	3:34	St. Louis, Missouri, United States	
Win	1–0	Adam Mohr	Submission (guillotine choke)	Shooto: Battle at the Ballpark 2	October 22, 2005	1	1:17	St. Louis, Missouri, United States	

== See also ==
- List of male mixed martial artists
