= Mike De La Torre =

American mixed martial arts fighter

- Born: Mike De La Torre; September 22, 1986 (age 40); San Diego, California, United States
- Other names: El Cucuy
- Nationality: American
- Height: 5 ft 11 in (1.80 m)
- Weight: 145 lb (66 kg; 10.4 st)
- Division: Featherweight; Lightweight
- Reach: 71.0 in (180 cm)
- Fighting out of: Glendale, Arizona
- Team: MMA Lab
- Rank: Blue belt in Brazilian Jiu-Jitsu
- Years active: 2006–present

Mixed martial arts record
- Total: 24
- Wins: 14
- By knockout: 7
- By submission: 5
- By decision: 2
- Losses: 9
- By knockout: 3
- By submission: 4
- By decision: 2
- No contests: 1

Other information
- Mixed martial arts record from Sherdog

Mike De La Torre (born September 22, 1986) is an American mixed martial artist, who competes as a featherweight.

== Mixed martial arts career ==
De La Torre began training in mixed martial arts in 2005, and made his professional debut in 2006 at the age of 19, competing primarily for regional promotions across the Southwestern United States and Mexico. He is currently focused on training his students at the MMA LAB in his now home of Phoenix, Az. De La Torre has a great following of students from BJJ, Muay Thai, and wrestling.

After getting his first six victories by way of stoppage in the first round, De La Torre was able to compile a record of 12–3 along the way before signing with the UFC in April 2014. He signed with the organization on the heels of a submission finish over Cameron Ramberg.

=== Ultimate Fighting Championship ===
De La Torre made his promotional debut on April 16, 2014, at The Ultimate Fighter: Nations Finale. against Mark Bocek. He was tabbed as a short notice injury replacement for Evan Dunham Bocek won the back and forth fight via split decision.

De La Torre faced Brian Ortega on July 26, 2014, at UFC on Fox 12. Ortega originally won the bout via submission (rear-naked choke) in the first round. Subsequently, the result was changed to "No Contest" after Ortega tested positive for drostanolone during a post fight screening.

De La Torre was briefly linked to a fight with Mark Eddiva on November 8, 2014, at UFC Fight Night 55. However, the fight was scrapped as both fighters were subsequently injured during training.

De La Torre faced Tiago Trator on February 22, 2015, at UFC Fight Night 61. De La Torre won the fight via TKO in the first round.

De La Torre faced Maximo Blanco on July 12, 2015, at The Ultimate Fighter 21 Finale. He lost the fight via TKO in the first round.

De La Torre faced Yui Chul Nam on November 28, 2015, at UFC Fight Night 79. He won the fight via split decision.

De La Torre was expected to face Renato Moicano on September 24, 2016, at UFC Fight Night 95. However, Moicano pulled out with injury and was replaced by Godofredo Pepey. He lost the fight via submission in the first round.

De La Torre faced Myles Jury on April 8, 2017, at UFC 210. He lost the fight via TKO in the first round.

In May 2017, De La Torre was released from the company.

=== LUX Fight League ===
De La Torre faced Sergio Cossio in the second event of the Mexican promotion LUX Fight League, held on February 17, 2018. He lost the fight by unanimous decision.

== Mixed martial arts record ==
Professional record breakdown
24 matches	14 wins	9 losses
By knockout	7	3
By submission	5	4
By decision	2	2
No contests	1	

Res.	Record	Opponent	Method	Event	Date	Round	Time	Location	Notes
Loss	14–7 (1)	Kazula Vargas	KO (head kick)	Combate Americas: Mexico vs. The World	May 18, 2018	1	0:18	Tijuana, Mexico	
Loss	14–7 (1)	Sergio Cossio	Decision (unanimous)	LUX 002	Feb 17, 2018	3	5:00	Mexico City, Mexico	
Loss	14–7 (1)	Myles Jury	TKO (punches)	UFC 210	April 8, 2017	1	3:30	Buffalo, New York, United States	
Loss	14–6 (1)	Godofredo Pepey	Submission (rear-naked choke)	UFC Fight Night: Cyborg vs. Lansberg	September 24, 2016	1	3:03	Brasília, Brazil	
Win	14–5 (1)	Yui Chul Nam	Decision (split)	UFC Fight Night: Henderson vs. Masvidal	November 28, 2015	3	5:00	Seoul, South Korea	
Loss	13–5 (1)	Maximo Blanco	TKO (punches)	The Ultimate Fighter: American Top Team vs. Blackzilians Finale	July 12, 2015	1	0:16	Las Vegas, Nevada, United States	Catchweight (148.5 lbs) bout; Blanco missed weight.
Win	13–4 (1)	Tiago Trator	TKO (punches)	UFC Fight Night: Bigfoot vs. Mir	February 22, 2015	1	2:59	Porto Alegre, Brazil	
NC	12–4 (1)	Brian Ortega	NC (overturned)	UFC on Fox: Lawler vs. Brown	July 26, 2014	1	1:39	San Jose, California, United States	Originally a submission (rear-naked choke) win for Ortega; overturned after he tested positive for drostanolone.
Loss	12–4	Mark Bocek	Decision (split)	The Ultimate Fighter Nations Finale: Bisping vs. Kennedy	April 16, 2014	3	5:00	Quebec City, Quebec, Canada	Lightweight bout.
Win	12–3	Cameron Ramberg	Submission (reverse triangle choke)	Dakota FC 17	January 11, 2014	3	1:03	Fargo, North Dakota, United States	Featherweight debut.
Win	11–3	James Terry	Submission (rear-naked choke)	Arise FC	June 15, 2013	1	0:57	Santa Clara, California, United States	
Win	10–3	Jordan Delano	TKO (punches)	XFS - Damage	November 17, 2012	1	1:16	Valley Center, California, United States	
Loss	9–3	Kris Armbrister	Submission (triangle choke)	XFS - Brutal Conduct	January 21, 2012	2	2:55	Valley Center, California, United States	
Win	9–2	Donald Molinas	Submission (rear-naked choke)	NFC - 11	January 21, 2012	1	0:36	Campo, California, United States	
Win	8–2	Fabian Quintanar	TKO (elbows)	UWC Mexico - 7	June 26, 2010	2	3:42	Tijuana, Mexico	
Win	7–2	Henry Briones	Decision (unanimous)	UCM 12	October 3, 2009	5	5:00	Tijuana, Mexico	
Loss	6–2	Joshua Williams	Submission (rear-naked choke)	Total Combat 30	April 2, 2008	2	1:52	Alpine, California, United States	
Win	6–1	Preston Scharf	Submission (rear-naked choke)	Total Combat Nevada	May 10, 2008	1	1:36	Laughlin, Nevada, United States	
Win	5–1	Jason Meadors	Submission (injury)	Total Combat 26	February 16, 2008	1	0:39	San Diego, California, United States	
Win	4–1	Noel Rodriguez	KO (punch)	MMAX - 18	January 26, 2008	1	0:41	Tijuana, Mexico	
Loss	3–1	Zach Taylor	Submission (triangle choke)	Total Combat 25	December 15, 2007	1	3:56	San Diego, California, United States	
Win	3–0	Enrique Cuellar	Submission (armbar)	MMAX 9	March 3, 2007	1	0:00	Tijuana, Mexico	
Win	2–0	James Ortega	KO (punches)	Total Combat 17	October 21, 2007	1	0:00	Yuma, Arizona, United States	
Win	1–0	Isaac Peralta	KO (punch)	MMAX 4	August 19, 2006	1	0:08	Tijuana, Mexico	

== See also ==
- List of current UFC fighters
- List of male mixed martial artists
