= Tiago Trator =

Brazilian mixed martial arts fighter

- Born: April 12, 1987 (age 39); Laranjal do Jari, Brazil
- Other names: Trator
- Height: 5 ft 9 in (1.75 m)
- Weight: 155 lb (70 kg; 11 st 1 lb)
- Division: Lightweight; Featherweight
- Reach: 70 in (178 cm)
- Fighting out of: Laranjal do Jari, Amapa, Brazil
- Team: Team Nogueira
- Years active: 2009–present

Mixed martial arts record
- Total: 33
- Wins: 22
- By knockout: 7
- By submission: 7
- By decision: 8
- Losses: 9
- By knockout: 3
- By submission: 3
- By decision: 3
- Draws: 1
- No contests: 1

Other information
- Mixed martial arts record from Sherdog

Tiago dos Santos e Silva (born April 12, 1987) is a Brazilian mixed martial artist who competed in the Featherweight division of the Ultimate Fighting Championship.

== Mixed martial arts career ==
=== Early career ===
Starting his career in 2009, Trator compiled a 18–4–1 (1) record fighting mostly for regional Brazilian promotions, winning the Vacant Jungle Fight Lightweight Championship in the process.

=== Ultimate Fighting Championship ===
Tiago made his promotional debut against Akbarh Arreola dos Santos on July 26, 2014 at UFC on Fox 12. He won the fight via unanimous decision.

Trator faced Mike De La Torre on February 22, 2015 at UFC Fight Night 61. Trator lost the fight via TKO in the first round.

Trator faced Clay Collard on September 5, 2015 at UFC 191 as an injury replacement for Andre Fili. Trator won the fight by split decision.

Trator faced promotional newcomer Shane Burgos on December 9, 2016 at UFC Fight Night 102 against Tiago Trator. He lost the fight by unanimous decision.

He was released from the UFC sometime in 2017.

=== Post UFC ===
After his release from the UFC, Trator lost all of his three fights, with the most memorable loss coming at ACB 67 to Rasul Shovhalov by TKO.

== Championships and accomplishments ==
- Jungle Fight Championship
  - Jungle Fight Lightweight Championship (One time)
    - One successful title defense

== Mixed martial arts record ==
Professional record breakdown
33 matches	22 wins	9 losses
By knockout	7	3
By submission	7	3
By decision	8	3
Draws	1	
No contests	1	

Res.	Record	Opponent	Method	Event	Date	Round	Time	Location	Notes
Win	22–9–1 (1)	Fábio Silva	Submission (rear-naked choke)	Dispute Fight Series 1	August 6, 2022	1	2:01	Santarém, Brazil	Won the vacant DFS 165 lb Championship.
Win	21–9–1 (1)	Bruno Lobato	Decision (majority)	Macaco Fight 8	May 14, 2022	3	5:00	Laranjal do Jari, Brazil	Won the vacant MF Lightweight Championship.
Loss	20–9–1 (1)	Bruno Leandro Soares Lobato	Decision (split)	Macaco Fight 6	August 17, 2019	3	5:00	Laranjal do Jari, Brazil	
Loss	20–8–1 (1)	Rasul Shovhalov	TKO (punches)	ACB 67	August 19, 2017	1	2:17	Grozny, Russia	
Loss	20–7–1 (1)	Oberdan Vieira Tenorio	KO (flying knee and punches)	Eco Fight Championship 18	May 6, 2017	1	3:36	Macapá, Brazil	Return to Lightweight.
Loss	20–6–1 (1)	Shane Burgos	Decision (unanimous)	UFC Fight Night: Lewis vs. Abdurakhimov	December 9, 2016	3	5:00	Albany, New York, United States	
Win	20–5–1 (1)	Clay Collard	Decision (split)	UFC 191	September 5, 2015	3	5:00	Las Vegas, Nevada, United States	
Loss	19–5–1 (1)	Mike de la Torre	TKO (punches)	UFC Fight Night: Bigfoot vs. Mir	February 22, 2015	1	2:59	Porto Alegre, Brazil	Featherweight debut.
Win	19–4–1 (1)	Akbarh Arreola	Decision (unanimous)	UFC on Fox: Lawler vs. Brown	July 26, 2014	3	5:00	San Jose, California, United States	
Win	18–4–1 (1)	Ary Santos	TKO (doctor stoppage)	Jungle Fight 65	February 2, 2014	3	2:48	Madre de Deus, Brazil	Defended Jungle Fight Lightweight Championship.
Win	17–4–1 (1)	Geraldo Coelho de Lima Neto	Submission (arm-triangle choke)	Jungle Fight 59	October 12, 2013	3	4:11	Rio de Janeiro, Brazil	Won Vacant Jungle Fight Lightweight Championship.
Win	16–4–1 (1)	Leandro Vasconcelos	Submission (rear-naked choke)	Jungle Fight 56	August 24, 2013	1	4:01	Foz do Iguaçu, Brazil	
Win	15–4–1 (1)	Dimitry Zebroski	Decision (split)	Jungle Fight 50	April 6, 2013	3	5:00	Novo Hamburgo, Brazi	
Win	14–4–1 (1)	Rafael Alves	TKO (retirement)	Jungle Fight 45	November 15, 2012	2	0:00	Belém, Brazil	
Win	13–4–1 (1)	Sebastian Latorre	Submission (arm-triangle choke)	Jungle Fight 40	June 15, 2012	2	2:10	Macapá, Brazil	
Win	12–4–1 (1)	Silvio Jose da Silva	Submission (anaconda choke)	Jungle Fight 39	May 12, 2012	3	2:37	Rio de Janeiro, Brazil	
Win	11–4–1 (1)	Rafael Addario Bastos	TKO (punches)	Iron Man Vale Tudo 23	April 7, 2012	3	2:25	Macapá, Brazil	
Win	10–4–1 (1)	Jamil Silveira da Conceicao	Decision (unanimous)	Tropa de Elite 2	February 4, 2012	3	5:00	Macapá, Brazil	
Loss	9–4–1 (1)	Silmar Nunes	Decision (split)	Amazon Fight 10	December 7, 2011	3	5:00	Belém, Brazil	
Win	9–3–1 (1)	Neliton Jose Serrao Furtado	Submission (anaconda choke)	Golden Fight 2	October 8, 2011	3	0:00	Macapá, Brazil	
Win	8–3–1 (1)	Alexandre Alcantara	Submission (rear-naked choke)	Desafio de Gigantes 11	September 11, 2011	1	4:25	Macapá, Brazil	
Loss	7–3–1 (1)	Rondinelli Rodrigues Gomes	Submission (kneebar)	Tropa de Elite 1	September 3, 2011	3	1:28	Macapá, Brazil	
Win	7–2–1 (1)	Michel Addario Bastos	Decision (split)	W-Combat 14	July 16, 2011	3	5:00	Macapá, Brazil	
Win	6–2–1 (1)	Nilton Eduardo Silva dos Santos	TKO (doctor stoppage)	W-Combat 14	July 16, 2011	1	5:00	Macapá, Brazil	
Win	5–2–1 (1)	Danielson Gomes dos Santos	TKO (punches)	MMA: Evolution 4	July 2, 2011	2	4:42	Macapá, Brazil	
NC	4–2–1 (1)	Danielson Gomes dos Santos	NC (overturned)	Ecofight 13	May 14, 2011	1	0:00	Macapá, Brazil	
Win	4–2–1	Oberdan Vieira Tenorio	Decision (unanimous)	Macapa Martial Arts	April 9, 2011	3	5:00	Macapá, Brazil	
Win	3–2–1	Caio Felipe Bittencourt da Silva	Decision (split)	Iron Man Vale Tudo 21	February 5, 2011	3	5:00	Macapá, Brazil	
Loss	2–2–1	Fabricio de Assis Costa da Silva	Submission (rear-naked choke)	Ecofight 12	December 11, 2010	3	2:45	Macapá, Brazil	
Win	2–1–1	Elielson Almeida	TKO (punches)	Ecofight 12	December 11, 2010	1	2:43	Macapá, Brazil	
Win	1–1–1	Caio Felipe Bittencourt da Silva	TKO (punches)	Ultimate Finus Fighting 2	November 6, 2010	2	3:34	Macapá, Brazil	
Draw	0–1–1	Alisson Deivid Rodrigues	Draw (majority)	Marques Fight 1	April 10, 2010	3	5:00	Laranjal do Jari, Brazil	
Loss	0–1	Alex Marcos Correia Ferreira	Submission (armbar)	Amazonia Combat	May 29, 2009	2	1:40	Macapá, Brazil	

== See also ==
- List of male mixed martial artists
