= UFC 184 =

UFC mixed martial arts event in 2015

UFC 184: Rousey vs. Zingano
- The poster for UFC 184: Rousey vs. Zingano
- Promotion: Ultimate Fighting Championship
- Date: February 28, 2015
- Venue: Staples Center
- City: Los Angeles, California
- Attendance: 16,577
- Total gate: $2,675,560
- Buyrate: 600,000

Event chronology
UFC Fight Night: Bigfoot vs. Mir	UFC 184: Rousey vs. Zingano	UFC 185: Pettis vs. dos Anjos

UFC 184: Rousey vs. Zingano was a mixed martial arts event held on February 28, 2015, at Staples Center in Los Angeles, California.

== Background ==
A UFC Middleweight Championship bout between Chris Weidman and Vitor Belfort was expected to serve as the event headliner. The much delayed pairing was previously scheduled to take place at UFC 173 and also at UFC 181. However, on January 30, the UFC announced that Weidman had pulled out of the bout, citing an injury he sustained in training. Subsequently, a UFC Women's Bantamweight Championship bout between current champion Ronda Rousey and top contender Cat Zingano was promoted to the main event. Belfort was offered an interim title fight first against Lyoto Machida and then Gegard Mousasi as a replacement for Weidman, but he declined and stated that he would only fight for the full title.

Neil Magny was briefly linked to a bout with Josh Koscheck at the event. However, Magny was pulled from the fight in favor of a bout with Kiichi Kunimoto at UFC Fight Night 60. Koscheck faced Jake Ellenberger instead.

A bout between touted newcomer Holly Holm and Raquel Pennington, originally booked for UFC 181 and ultimately scrapped due to Holm being injured, served as the co-headliner.

Mark Muñoz was very briefly scheduled to a bout with Caio Magalhães at the event. However, shortly after the bout was announced by the UFC, Magalhães indicated that he would not be able to compete at the event due to a lingering infection after recent dental surgery, which would require additional surgery. Muñoz stayed on the card and faced returning UFC veteran Roan Carneiro.

A heavyweight bout between former UFC Heavyweight champion Frank Mir and Antônio Silva, originally scheduled for the main card, was moved up a week and served as the event headliner for UFC Fight Night 61.

Ronaldo Souza was expected to face Yoel Romero at this event. However, on January 15, Souza was forced to withdraw from the bout with pneumonia. The pairing was left intact and the fight rescheduled for UFC on Fox 15.

Yancy Medeiros was slated to face Tony Ferguson at this event, but an injured foot forced him out of the bout. On the same day, Gleison Tibau was announced as his replacement.

== Results ==
Main Card
Weight class				Method	Round	Time	Notes
Women's Bantamweight	Ronda Rousey (c)	def.	Cat Zingano	Submission (straight armbar)	1	0:14	(Note: For the UFC Women's Bantamweight Championship.)
Women's Bantamweight	Holly Holm	def.	Raquel Pennington	Decision (split) (29–28, 28–29, 30–27)	3	5:00
Welterweight	Jake Ellenberger	def.	Josh Koscheck	Submission (north-south choke)	2	4:20
Welterweight	Alan Jouban	def.	Richard Walsh	KO (elbow and punches)	1	2:19
Lightweight	Tony Ferguson	def.	Gleison Tibau	Submission (rear-naked choke)	1	2:37
Preliminary Card (Fox Sports 1)
Middleweight	Roan Carneiro	def.	Mark Muñoz	Technical Submission (rear-naked choke)	1	1:40
Bantamweight	Roman Salazar	vs.	Norifumi Yamamoto	No Contest (accidental eye poke)	2	2:37	(Note: An accidental eye poke rendered Salazar unable to continue; as the fight had not reached the third round, it was declared a No Contest.)
Welterweight	Tim Means	def.	Dhiego Lima	TKO (punches)	1	2:17
Heavyweight	Derrick Lewis	def.	Ruan Potts	TKO (punches)	2	3:18
Preliminary Card (UFC Fight Pass)
Lightweight	Valmir Lázaro	def.	James Krause	Decision (split) (29–28, 28–29, 29–28)	3	5:00
Featherweight	Masio Fullen	def.	Alex Torres	Decision (split) (28–29, 29–28, 29–28)	3	5:00

== Bonus awards ==
The following fighters were awarded $50,000 bonuses:

- Fight of the Night: None awarded
- Performance of the Night: Ronda Rousey, Jake Ellenberger, Tony Ferguson and Tim Means

== Reported payout ==
The following is the reported payout to the fighters as reported to the California State Athletic Commission. It does not include sponsor money or "locker room" bonuses often given by the UFC and also do not include the UFC's traditional "fight night" bonuses.

- Ronda Rousey: $130,000 ($65,000 win bonus) def. Cat Zingano: $100,000
- Holly Holm: $50,000 ($25,000 win bonus) def. Raquel Pennington: $10,000
- Jake Ellenberger: $136,000 ($68,000 win bonus) def. Josh Koscheck: $78,000
- Alan Jouban: $20,000 ($10,000 win bonus) def. Richard Walsh: $8,000
- Tony Ferguson: $48,000 ($24,000 win bonus) def. Gleison Tibau: $50,000
- Roan Carneiro: $24,000 ($12,000 win bonus) def. Mark Muñoz: $47,000
- Ramon Salazar: $8,000 vs. Norifumi Yamamoto: $15,000 ^
- Tim Means: $34,000 ($17,000 win bonus) def. Dhiego Lima: $10,000
- Derrick Lewis: $30,000 ($15,000 win bonus) def. Ruan Potts: $10,000
- Valmir Lazaro: $16,000 ($8,000 win bonus) def. James Krause: $15,000
- Masio Fullen: $16,000 ($8,000 win bonus) def. Alexander Torres: $8,000

^ Both fighters earned show money; bout declared No Contest.

== See also ==
- List of UFC events
- 2015 in UFC
