= Frank Mir =

American mixed martial artist (born 1979)

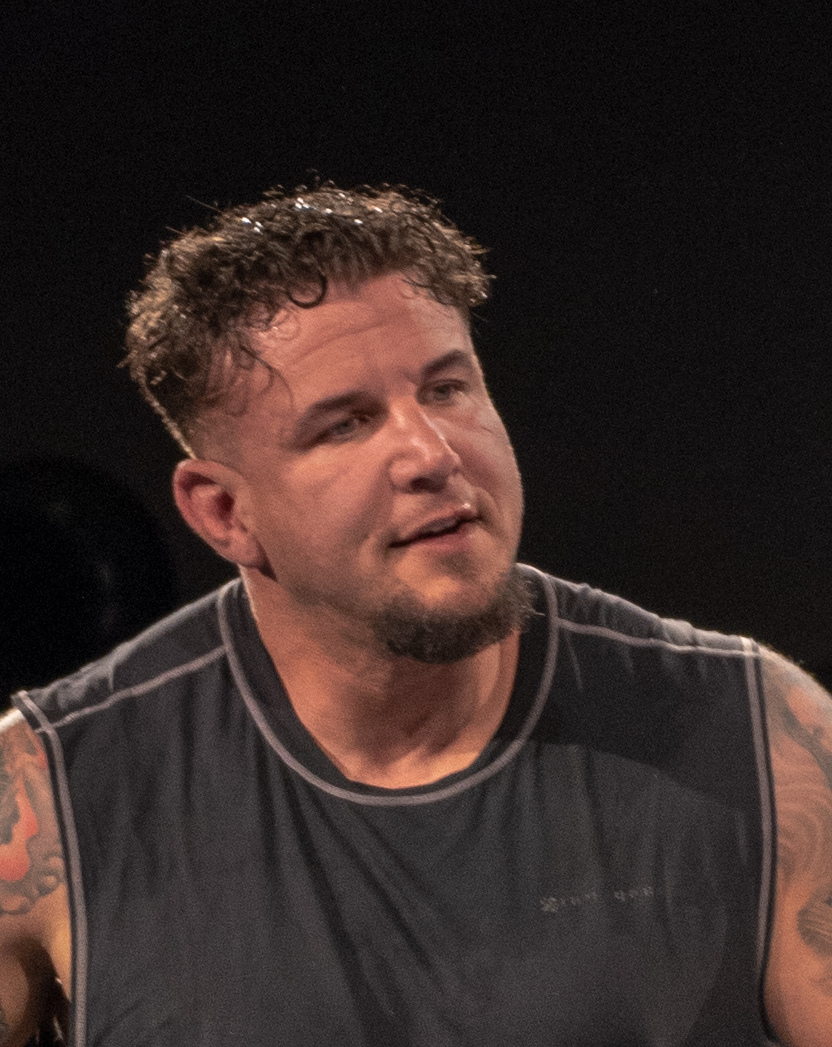
- Mir in April 2019
- Born: Francisco Santos Miranda III; May 24, 1979 (age 47); Las Vegas, Nevada, U.S.
- Height: 6 ft 3 in (191 cm)
- Weight: 262 lb (119 kg; 18 st 10 lb)
- Division: Heavyweight
- Reach: 79 in (201 cm)
- Style: Brazilian Jiu-Jitsu
- Stance: Southpaw
- Fighting out of: Las Vegas, Nevada, U.S.
- Team: Syndicate MMA
- Trainer: John Wood; Carl Prince; Robert Drysdale
- Rank: Black belt in American Kenpo; Black belt in Brazilian Jiu-Jitsu under Ricardo Pires
- Years active: 2001–2019 (MMA); 2021 (Boxing)

Professional boxing record
- Total: 2
- Wins: 0
- Losses: 2
- By knockout: 1

Mixed martial arts record
- Total: 32
- Wins: 19
- By knockout: 5
- By submission: 9
- By decision: 4
- By disqualification: 1
- Losses: 13
- By knockout: 10
- By decision: 3

Other information
- Spouse: Jennifer (m. 2004)
- Children: 4
- Notable school: Bonanza High School
- Mixed martial arts record from Sherdog

Frank Mir (born Francisco Santos Miranda III) (/ˈmɪər/) (born May 24, 1979), is an American former mixed martial artist. He competed in the heavyweight division of the Ultimate Fighting Championship (UFC) throughout the 2000s and 2010s, before finishing his pro MMA career in Bellator MMA in 2019. A former UFC Heavyweight Champion, he holds the record for the most submission victories in UFC Heavyweight history. A 27-fight UFC veteran, Mir formerly possessed the longest uninterrupted tenure of any fighter in the promotion's history, as he was under UFC contract from November 2001 until July 2017. He was the first man to knock out and the first to submit Antônio Rodrigo Nogueira.

== Background ==
Born and raised in Las Vegas, Nevada, Mir began training and competing in American Kenpo at a school owned by his parents, earning his black belt as a teenager. Mir's father played a major role in convincing him to begin wrestling on the basis that it could help him avoid submissions. Mir joined the wrestling team at Bonanza High School during his junior year and lost his first nine matches. During his senior year (1998) he went 44–1 and won the state championship. Mir played fullback and defensive end on the school's football team, which reached the Southern Zone semifinals in 1997. He also competed in track and field; his discus throw of 177 feet 10 inches (54.20 meters) is still a Sunset Regional record.

== Career ==
Mir met UFC matchmaker Joe Silva at a Brazilian jiu-jitsu (BJJ) school. Silva saw potential in Mir and suggested that he compete in mixed martial arts. Mir made his professional debut against Jerome Smith at HOOKnSHOOT: Showdown on July 14, 2001. Mir won the bout by unanimous decision after two rounds. He won his second fight by triangle choke in the first round, against Dan Quinn at IFC Warriors Challenge 15 on August 31, 2001.

=== Ultimate Fighting Championship ===
On November 2, 2001, at UFC 34: High Voltage, Mir made his UFC debut against 6th degree BJJ black belt Roberto Traven. Traven had previously competed in the UFC (at UFC 11) and was the 1999 ADCC Submission Wrestling World Championship open class champion. Mir defeated Traven by armbar at 1:05 of round one, earning "Tapout of the Night" in the process. Mir's next UFC match was against Lion's Den fighter and eight-time UFC veteran Pete Williams at UFC 36: Worlds Collide on March 22, 2002. Mir submitted Williams in 46 seconds with an inside shoulder lock that has since been named after himself. It was the only submission loss of Williams' career.

Mir faced Ian Freeman in London, England, at UFC 38: Brawl at the Hall on July 13, 2002. Despite several leglock attempts by Mir, Freeman achieved side control four minutes into the first round and landed numerous punches and elbows to Mir's head. A time out was called due to a cut on Mir's face. After Freeman separated, the referee signaled to Mir to stand back up and stopped the fight after Mir struggled to do so.

Mir then faced Tank Abbott at UFC 41 on February 28, 2003. Mir submitted Abbott with a toe hold in 46 seconds. On June 26, 2003, Mir fought Wes Sims at UFC 43: Meltdown. Mir won by disqualification at 2:55 of the first round after Sims stomped on Mir's jaw following a slam escape of an armbar attempt by Mir. They would rematch at UFC 46: Supernatural on January 31, 2004. Mir won by knockout at 4:21 of the second round.

==== Heavyweight championship ====
On June 19, 2004, Mir faced Tim Sylvia for the vacant UFC Heavyweight Championship at UFC 48: Payback. Referee Herb Dean stopped the fight 50 seconds into the first round after Mir broke Sylvia's right forearm with a straight armbar. Sylvia initially protested the call but relented following a replay of the break. He was taken to a nearby hospital where an x-ray showed that his arm was broken in four places, two in both the radius and ulna bones of his right forearm. Sylvia underwent surgery later that week. Mir earned his BJJ black belt from Ricardo Pires following this performance.

==== Motorcycle injury ====
On September 17, 2004, Mir was knocked off his motorcycle by a car. The accident caused two breaks in Mir's femur and tore all the ligaments in his knee. An Interim Heavyweight Championship was created while Mir recovered from surgery, which Andrei Arlovski won by defeating Tim Sylvia via first round submission. On August 12, 2005, the UFC learned that Mir would not be able to face Andrei Arlovski in October as scheduled and stripped him of the title after 14 months, promoting Arlovski to undisputed UFC Heavyweight Champion. In 2010, Mir told FIGHT! Magazine that he was grateful for the accident as it gave him time to be with his wife.

==== Return to the UFC ====
In his first bout since the accident, Mir fought 4th degree BJJ black belt and six-time Mundials champion Márcio Cruz at UFC 57: Liddell vs. Couture 3 on February 4, 2006. In a shocking upset, Mir was defeated by first-round TKO. He returned to the octagon on July 8, 2006, at UFC 61: Bitter Rivals against Dan Christison. Mir won by unanimous decision when all three judges scored the bout 29–28. Mir was widely criticized following the bout due to his sloppy appearance and inability to finish a seemingly mismatched opponent. Despite the criticism, Mir was subsequently matched with Brandon Vera at UFC 65: Bad Intentions to determine the number one contender. Mir showed improved striking ability but was quickly stunned by a straight right from Vera, who then dropped him with knees from the Muay Thai clinch. Vera then secured side control and delivered a number of punches and elbows, forcing the referee to stop the fight at 1:09 of the first round. While preparing for UFC 140, Mir attributed his poor performance in his initial return bouts to lingering health issues following the accident.

==== Rise back to title contention ====
Mir was scheduled to fight kickboxer Antoni Hardonk at UFC Fight Night 9 on April 5, 2007, but had to drop out due to a shoulder injury. He faced Hardonk at UFC 74 and won via kimura at 1:17 of the first round. At the end of the bout, Mir walked to the cameras pointing at himself saying "I'm back!". Frank's wife Jennifer was shown on the replay screaming and crying with joy when Frank secured the kimura and the fight was stopped.

On February 2, 2008, at UFC 81, Mir welcomed former WWE wrestler Brock Lesnar to the octagon for Lesnar's highly anticipated debut. It took Lesnar less than 10 seconds to shoot for a takedown and muscle Mir to the mat. However, seconds after Lesnar began to unload strikes from Mir's half guard, referee Steve Mazzagatti controversially deemed that there were some illegal punches landed to the back of Mir's head, drawing a foul and a one-point deduction. The fighters were ordered to stand up, and Mir was given a brief recovery period. As the fight resumed, Mir was almost instantly dropped with a big punch from Lesnar. Lesnar continued to land punches on Mir and shucked off Mir's armbar attempt before moving to a stacked guard. It was here that Mir caught Lesnar with a kneebar, causing Lesnar to tap out at 1:30 of the first round. Mir was awarded with Submission of the Night honors.

==== The Ultimate Fighter season 8 ====
Spike TV announced on May 12, 2008, that former UFC champion Frank Mir would face off with the current UFC Interim Heavyweight Champion and former PRIDE Heavyweight Champion Antônio Rodrigo Nogueira as the coaches for the eighth season of The Ultimate Fighter. The season, which premiered on Spike TV on September 17, returned to the two weight class format. It featured Light heavyweight and Lightweight fighters. Production on season eight began in late May, with the entire cast announced in September, and concluded in December.

==== Second heavyweight championship ====
Mir fought his fellow Ultimate Fighter coach, Antônio Rodrigo Nogueira, at UFC 92 for the Interim UFC Heavyweight Championship. This bout was part of a mini-Heavyweight tournament, often hyped by UFC president Dana White. The winner of this fight would then face the winner of the match between the Heavyweight Champion Randy Couture and Brock Lesnar. Lesnar defeated Couture by TKO in the second round, earning him the Heavyweight Championship belt in the process and setting him up to face the winner of Nogueira/Mir to unify the belts.

"I wish I could make the statement that 'the odds were against me, but you never quit.' It was not true. I wanted to give up."

— Frank Mir, talking about his career ups and downs.

In the fight with Nogueira, Mir showcased vastly improved striking, particularly his boxing, knocking him down twice in the first round and once in the second. Herb Dean stopped the match at 1:54 of the second round, declaring Mir the winner. Nogueira's loss marked the first time he had lost a fight due to strikes. In a post-fight interview, Mir credited his improved striking to a drastic improvement in conditioning.

Two days after the fight, Dana White revealed in an interview that "Nogueira had just gotten over a Staph infection." Nogueira himself verified this fact several months later in his own interview, stating that he had a staph infection "20 days before the fight, [requiring] 5 days in the hospital." When asked if this infection affected his fight, he answered, "For sure." In addition to this illness, his knee was injured during training, for which he had surgery in February 2009. Despite these handicaps, Nogueira offered strong praise for Mir's performance, with particular credit given to Mir's ability to maintain "very good distance."

==== Heavyweight championship unification ====
Mir's victory over Nogueira set in place a re-match with the UFC Heavyweight Champion Brock Lesnar for the UFC Heavyweight Championship. However, Mir stated, that in his opinion, holding victories over former UFC Interim Heavyweight Champion Antônio Rodrigo Nogueira at UFC 92 and current UFC Heavyweight Champion Brock Lesnar at UFC 81 is enough to recognize him as the owner of the "real belt." Mir was originally scheduled to fight Lesnar at UFC 98 On May 23, 2009, in Las Vegas, Nevada, however, he sustained a knee injury during training which required arthroscopic surgery and the removal of bone chips from his knee. The rematch against Lesnar was therefore rescheduled for UFC 100 on July 11, 2009. The show would break many UFC records in terms of PPV sales and is in the top 3 best selling UFC PPV of all time.

At UFC 100, Mir was lively on his feet but proved unable to counter Lesnar's wrestling and positional dominance. Lesnar dominated the first round with superior wrestling. In the second round, after being allowed to stand up, Mir landed a combination, ending with a turning right elbow which forced Lesnar to look for a clinch. Mir took this opportunity to attempt a jumping right knee, which landed, but ultimately resulted in Lesnar securing another takedown. After a short period of recovery from the knee, Lesnar pinned Mir up against the cage and delivered multiple unanswered heavy blows to his face, forcing referee Herb Dean to stop the fight via TKO at 1:48 in the second round. With the win, Lesnar became the undisputed UFC Heavyweight Champion.

"A lot of individuals are so worried about being politically correct. I'd rather go ahead and say what's on my mind than to sit there and come up with some PC 'Oh, the guy is a great fighter, and I have a lot of respect for him.' If I don't mean it, why is it even coming out of my mouth? ... I want to fight Lesnar. I hate who he is as a person. I want to break his neck in the ring. I want him to be the first person that dies due to Octagon-related injuries. That's what's going through my mind."

— Frank Mir after UFC 107.

==== Mir vs. Kongo ====
Mir had his next fight against Cheick Kongo on December 12, 2009, at UFC 107. Two months prior to this fight, Mir replaced his striking coach Ken Hahn with boxing trainer Jimmy Gifford. Mir was expected to weigh 20 to 25 lbs heavier than usual, due to the strength and conditioning program that he had undertaken to improve his muscular frame. As expected, Mir weighed in for his fight against Kongo at 264.5 lbs. At the weigh-ins, Kongo refused to face Mir during the traditional stare-down before the fight. During the fight, Mir stunned Kongo with an overhand left early, dropping him and swarming to secure a guillotine choke victory at 1:12 in the first round. Kongo refused to tap and was rendered unconscious by the choke. In the post-fight press conference, Mir expressed his desire to fight a rubber match with Brock Lesnar. Mir later created controversy after commenting that he wanted to break Lesnar's neck, so that he would become the first mixed martial artist to die in competition. Mir later made an apology for his comments after being admonished by Dana White.

==== Interim Heavyweight Championship bout ====
Mir faced Shane Carwin for the UFC Interim Heavyweight Championship on March 27, 2010, at UFC 111. After a brief standup exchange, Carwin pushed Mir against the cage, where he delivered several short uppercuts to Mir's chin. Mir lost the fight via knockout at 3:48 of the first round.

==== Second rise back to title contention ====
At a UFC Fan Expo, Mir said he briefly considered dropping down to the Light heavyweight division, although he later confirmed he would remain at Heavyweight. He was expected to face Antônio Rodrigo Nogueira on September 25, 2010, at UFC 119 in a rematch of the Interim Championship bout which Mir won via TKO at UFC 92. Nogueira pulled out of this fight due to knee surgery and was replaced by Mirko Cro Cop. Mir defeated Mirko Cro Cop via third-round knockout, earning the win with a knee from the clinch in a largely uneventful fight in which neither fighter was able to deliver any significant offense.

Mir faced former IFL Heavyweight Champion Roy Nelson on May 28, 2011, at UFC 130. He won via unanimous decision (30–27, 30–27, and 30–26) by using superior control and constant pressure. Mir showed improved wrestling by pushing Nelson against the cage, completing a Judo sweeping hip throw (Harai Goshi) and securing several takedowns in the third round. Mir landed several hard knees and elbows from the Muay Thai clinch throughout the bout but was unable to finish the durable Nelson.

"I had a strong inclination that he Nogueira was not going to tap, so I took a deep breath and you guys saw what happened. I was being a little too reactionary. When he caught me with the right hand, at that point, it turned into a war. I started to move around, and he wanted to play jiu-jitsu with me. I'm pretty good on the ground."

— Frank Mir at the UFC 140 post-fight press conference.

A rematch with Antônio Rodrigo Nogueira took place on December 10, 2011, at UFC 140. In the bout, Mir was dropped during the first round by a punch from Nogueira, and the bout was nearly stopped. Mir quickly recovered and gained superior positioning, defeating Nogueira by kimura at 3:38 of round 1, snapping Nogueira's arm in the process, as Nogueira refused to tap. Along with being the first fighter to have finished Nogueira via knockout, Mir became the first fighter to have defeated Nogueira via submission in mixed martial arts. The victory also earned Mir a $75,000 Submission of the Night honor award. UFC President Dana White called it the "submission of the century" at the post-fight press conference.

==== Third title shot and beyond ====
Mir was expected to face Cain Velasquez on May 25, 2012, at UFC 146. However, on April 20, 2012, Dana White announced that Mir would face Brazilian Junior dos Santos for the UFC Heavyweight Championship, replacing kickboxer Alistair Overeem. On May 11, 2012, UFC Primetime returned to promote the fight between Mir and dos Santos, and concluded on May 25. In their fight, dos Santos was able to use superior foot work to strike in and out before Mir could mount any significant offense. Mir lost the fight via TKO in the second round and said he would have to go back to the drawing board to continue his career.

Later in 2012, the UFC announced that Mir had been given a one fight sabbatical to compete under the Strikeforce banner to challenge Strikeforce Heavyweight Grand Prix Tournament Champion Daniel Cormier. The bout with Cormier was expected to take place on November 3, 2012, at Strikeforce: Cormier vs. Mir. However, on September 19 it was revealed that Mir suffered an injury in training and was forced to pull out of the bout. The bout with Cormier was rescheduled for April 20, 2013, at UFC on Fox 7. Mir lost the fight by unanimous decision.

Mir faced returning former UFC Heavyweight Champion Josh Barnett on August 31, 2013, at UFC 164. Mir lost via TKO in the first round.

Mir was scheduled to face Alistair Overeem on November 16, 2013, at UFC 167. However, the pairing was moved to February 1, 2014, at UFC 169. Mir lost the fight via unanimous decision.

Mir was expected to face Antônio Silva on February 28, 2015, at UFC 184. However, the bout with Silva was moved up a week and served as the event headliner for UFC Fight Night 61. Despite being the betting underdog, Mir won the fight via knockout in the first round, dropping Silva with a left hook and finishing him with a barrage of ground and pound. Subsequently, Mir won a Performance of the Night bonus.

Mir faced Todd Duffee at UFC Fight Night 71 on July 15, 2015. He won the fight via knockout in the first round after dropping Duffee with a straight left. Referee "Big" John McCarthy immediately stepped in to stop the fight as Duffee face planted onto the mat. Mir earned his second consecutive Performance of the Night bonus.

Mir faced Andrei Arlovski on September 5, 2015, at UFC 191. He lost the back-and-forth fight via unanimous decision, although some, including UFC president Dana White, scored the fight in his favor. 12 of 15 media outlets, however, scored the bout in favor of Arlovski.

Mir faced Mark Hunt on March 20, 2016, at UFC Fight Night 85 in Brisbane, Australia. He lost the fight via KO in the first round. On April 7, 2016, Mir was notified by the U.S. Anti-Doping Agency (USADA) that the sample he submitted the day of the fight tested positive for oral turinabol metabolites. In a statement, Mir responded, "I don't know how that is possible as I do not take any performance enhancing drugs (PEDs)." He was nonetheless suspended for two years.

Speaking in early 2017 Frank Mir opened up to a radio show about retirement rumors indicating he was still interested in actively competing, and a potential comeback. Mir indicated interest in a third Brock Lesnar fight.

On July 8, 2017, Mir announced that he had been granted his release from the UFC after nearly 16 years with the promotion, despite having six fights left on his contract.

=== Bellator MMA ===
On August 16, 2017, it was announced that Mir had signed a multi-fight deal with Bellator MMA.

In his debut fight for the promotion, Mir faced Fedor Emelianenko at Bellator 198 on April 28, 2018. The bout was part of the opening round of the Bellator Heavyweight Tournament. He lost the fight via TKO in round one.

In his second fight for the promotion, Mir faced Javy Ayala at Bellator 212 on December 14, 2018. Mir successfully won the first round by taking Ayala down and controlling him on the ground. However, Ayala rallied in the second round and Mir eventually lost by TKO after tapping to punches that caused an alveolar ridge fracture.

Mir faced Roy Nelson in a rematch of their 2011 UFC bout on October 25, 2019, in the main event of Bellator 231. He won via unanimous decision.

On April 1, 2020, Mir's contract with Bellator expired, making him a free agent.

=== United Fight League ===
Mir is currently under a two fight contract for the UFL, where he also works for as an ambassador. Mir announced his intention to retire from MMA after he finished those two fights on his contract. He originally was scheduled to make his debut in August 2023, but it was cancelled.

=== Professional wrestling ===
In January 2019, Josh Barnett announced via Twitter that Mir would be making his professional wrestling debut for Game Changer Wrestling's Bloodsport event, an independent wrestling event that features worked matches presented in an MMA style. Mir's debut coincided with WrestleMania 35 weekend on Thursday, April 4. On March 17, it was announced that Mir's debut match would be against former UFC Superfight Champion and former NWA World Heavyweight Champion Dan Severn. Mir defeated Severn, and post-match called out former UFC rival Brock Lesnar.

=== Professional boxing ===
On February 25, 2021, Mir announced he would be making his professional boxing debut against former multi-time light heavyweight and cruiserweight boxing champion Antonio Tarver on April 17 on the undercard of Jake Paul vs. Ben Askren. However, on March 23, it was revealed that Tarver was pulled from the bout after failing to meet the requirements to compete put forth by the Georgia Athletic and Entertainment Commission. Mir instead faced former IBF cruiserweight champion Steve Cunningham at the event, losing by unanimous decision.

=== Triad Combat ===
On November 27, 2021, Mir faced Kubrat Pulev in the main event of a boxing vs MMA card promoted by Triller that featured other UFC veterans. Mir lost the fight via TKO in the 1st round.

==== Global Fight League ====
On December 11, 2024, it was announced that Mir was signed by Global Fight League.

Mir was scheduled to face Fabrício Werdum at a to be announced date and location. However, the bout was cancelled in March 2025 as a result of Mir having to undergo an emergency surgery. In turn, in April 2025, it was reported that all GFL events were cancelled indefinitely.

=== Commentary and opinionist ===
Frank Mir was a color commentator for World Extreme Cagefighting until the 2010 WEC 47, when he was replaced by Stephan Bonnar. In June 2012, Mir stated in an interview with The Chronicle-Journal that he wants to pursue commentary after he retires from fighting. "I like analyzing fights, and I like doing color commentating," he said. "It's an opportunity I would take advantage of when I run into it. Hopefully it's something I can do full time". Mir was appointed in 2015 the color commentator for Absolute Championship Berkut.

== Personal life ==
Mir and his wife Jennifer have three children together, and Jennifer has a son from a previous relationship whom Mir adopted. Frank's oldest biological child, Bella, is also a professional mixed martial artist.

Mir is an atheist and a libertarian. He followed a vegan diet for a year but switched to a paleo diet due to lack of energy. He suffers from low testosterone and underwent testosterone replacement therapy from 2012 until its banning from combat sports in 2014.

Frank Mir's daughter Bella has also embarked upon a professional MMA career, winning her debut in October, 2020 with her father in her corner.

Mir worked as a bouncer at the Spearmint Rhino in Las Vegas before entering the UFC and continued to work there as Director of Security while pursuing his UFC career.

In January 2016, it was announced that Mir would be inducted into the Southern Nevada Sports Hall of Fame.

Frank Mir is of Cuban heritage through his father.

== Championships and accomplishments ==
=== Mixed martial arts ===
- Ultimate Fighting Championship
  - UFC Heavyweight Championship (One time)
  - Interim UFC Heavyweight Championship (One time)
  - Submission of the Night (Two times) vs. Brock Lesnar and Antônio Rodrigo Nogueira
  - Performance of the Night (Two times) vs. Antônio Silva and Todd Duffee
  - UFC Encyclopedia Awards
    - Fight of the Night (One time) vs. Ian Freeman
    - Knockout of the Night (One time) vs. Wes Sims 2
    - Submission of the Night (Four times) vs. Roberto Traven, Pete Williams, Tank Abbott and Tim Sylvia
  - Third most wins in UFC Heavyweight division history (16)
  - Third most fights in UFC Heavyweight division history (27)
  - Second most finishes in UFC heavyweight division history (13)
    - Third most first-round finishes in UFC history (11) (behind Jim Miller & Vitor Belfort)
  - Most submissions in UFC Heavyweight division history (8)
    - Most submission attempts in UFC Heavyweight division history (21)
    - Most submissions per 15 minute average in UFC Heavyweight division history (2.02)
    - Fastest submission in UFC Heavyweight division (45 seconds)
    - Tied (Gunnar Nelson & Islam Makhachev) for eighth most submission wins in UFC history (8)
  - First and only toe hold finish in UFC history
  - Fought five different UFC Heavyweight Champions
  - Defeated three different UFC Heavyweight Champions
  - UFC.com Awards
    - 2008: Upset of the Year vs. Antônio Rodrigo Nogueira 1, Ranked #5 Fighter of the Year & Ranked #2 Submission of the Year vs. Brock Lesnar
    - 2009: Ranked #3 Submission of the Year vs. Cheick Kongo
    - 2011: Submission of the Year vs. Antônio Rodrigo Nogueira 2
- FIGHT! Magazine
  - 2008 Submission of the Year vs. Brock Lesnar on February 2
- Sherdog
  - 2008 Comeback Fighter of the Year
  - 2011 Submission of the Year vs. Antônio Rodrigo Nogueira on December 10
  - 2011 All-Violence Second Team
  - Mixed Martial Arts Hall of Fame
- ESPN
  - 2011 Submission of the Year vs. Antônio Rodrigo Nogueira on December 10
- World MMA Awards
  - 2011 Submission of the Year vs. Antônio Rodrigo Nogueira at UFC 140
  - 2011 Comeback of the Year vs. Antônio Rodrigo Nogueira at UFC 140
- Rear Naked News
  - 2008 Comeback of the Year
- MMA Fighting
  - 2008 #6 Ranked UFC Submission of the Year vs. Brock Lesnar at UFC 81

=== Submission grappling ===
- Pan American Championships
  - Blue Belt Pesadissimo: 1st place (2001)
- North American Grappling Association
  - NAGA Absolute Division Champion (2007)

=== Amateur wrestling ===
- Nevada State Wrestling
  - Nevada State Wrestling Champion (1998)

== Mixed martial arts record ==
Professional record breakdown
32 matches	19 wins	13 losses
By knockout	5	10
By submission	9	0
By decision	4	3
By disqualification	1	0

Res.	Record	Opponent	Method	Event	Date	Round	Time	Location	Notes
Win	19–13	Roy Nelson	Decision (unanimous)	Bellator 231	October 25, 2019	3	5:00	Uncasville, Connecticut, United States	
Loss	18–13	Javy Ayala	TKO (submission to punches)	Bellator 212	December 14, 2018	2	4:30	Honolulu, Hawaii, United States	
Loss	18–12	Fedor Emelianenko	KO (punches)	Bellator 198	April 28, 2018	1	0:48	Rosemont, Illinois, United States	Bellator Heavyweight World Grand Prix Quarterfinal.
Loss	18–11	Mark Hunt	KO (punch)	UFC Fight Night: Hunt vs. Mir	March 20, 2016	1	3:01	Brisbane, Australia	Mir tested positive for a turinabol metabolite.
Loss	18–10	Andrei Arlovski	Decision (unanimous)	UFC 191	September 5, 2015	3	5:00	Las Vegas, Nevada, United States	
Win	18–9	Todd Duffee	KO (punch)	UFC Fight Night: Mir vs. Duffee	July 15, 2015	1	1:13	San Diego, California, United States	Performance of the Night.
Win	17–9	Antônio Silva	KO (elbows)	UFC Fight Night: Bigfoot vs. Mir	February 22, 2015	1	1:40	Porto Alegre, Brazil	Performance of the Night.
Loss	16–9	Alistair Overeem	Decision (unanimous)	UFC 169	February 1, 2014	3	5:00	Newark, New Jersey, United States	
Loss	16–8	Josh Barnett	TKO (knee)	UFC 164	August 31, 2013	1	1:56	Milwaukee, Wisconsin, United States	
Loss	16–7	Daniel Cormier	Decision (unanimous)	UFC on Fox: Henderson vs. Melendez	April 20, 2013	3	5:00	San Jose, California, United States	
Loss	16–6	Junior dos Santos	TKO (punches)	UFC 146	May 26, 2012	2	3:04	Las Vegas, Nevada, United States	For the UFC Heavyweight Championship.
Win	16–5	Antônio Rodrigo Nogueira	Technical Submission (kimura)	UFC 140	December 10, 2011	1	3:38	Toronto, Ontario, Canada	Submission of the Night.
Win	15–5	Roy Nelson	Decision (unanimous)	UFC 130	May 28, 2011	3	5:00	Las Vegas, Nevada, United States	
Win	14–5	Mirko Cro Cop	KO (knee)	UFC 119	September 25, 2010	3	4:02	Indianapolis, Indiana, United States	
Loss	13–5	Shane Carwin	KO (punches)	UFC 111	March 27, 2010	1	3:48	Newark, New Jersey, United States	For the interim UFC Heavyweight Championship.
Win	13–4	Cheick Kongo	Technical Submission (guillotine choke)	UFC 107	December 12, 2009	1	1:12	Memphis, Tennessee, United States	
Loss	12–4	Brock Lesnar	TKO (punches)	UFC 100	July 11, 2009	2	1:48	Las Vegas, Nevada, United States	For the UFC Heavyweight Championship.
Win	12–3	Antônio Rodrigo Nogueira	TKO (punches)	UFC 92	December 27, 2008	2	1:57	Las Vegas, Nevada, United States	Won the interim UFC Heavyweight Championship.
Win	11–3	Brock Lesnar	Submission (kneebar)	UFC 81	February 2, 2008	1	1:30	Las Vegas, Nevada, United States	Lesnar was deducted one point in round 1 for strikes to the back of the head. Submission of the Night.
Win	10–3	Antoni Hardonk	Submission (kimura)	UFC 74	August 25, 2007	1	1:17	Las Vegas, Nevada, United States	
Loss	9–3	Brandon Vera	TKO (punches)	UFC 65	November 18, 2006	1	1:09	Sacramento, California, United States	
Win	9–2	Dan Christison	Decision (unanimous)	UFC 61	July 8, 2006	3	5:00	Las Vegas, Nevada, United States	
Loss	8–2	Márcio Cruz	TKO (punches and elbows)	UFC 57	February 4, 2006	1	4:10	Las Vegas, Nevada, United States	
Win	8–1	Tim Sylvia	Technical Submission (armbar)	UFC 48	June 19, 2004	1	0:50	Las Vegas, Nevada, United States	Won the vacant UFC Heavyweight Championship. Mir was stripped of the title on August 12, 2005 due to injury.
Win	7–1	Wes Sims	KO (punches)	UFC 46	January 31, 2004	2	4:21	Las Vegas, Nevada, United States	
Win	6–1	Wes Sims	DQ (kicking a downed opponent)	UFC 43	June 6, 2003	1	2:55	Las Vegas, Nevada, United States	
Win	5–1	Tank Abbott	Submission (toe hold)	UFC 41	February 28, 2003	1	0:45	Atlantic City, New Jersey, United States	
Loss	4–1	Ian Freeman	TKO (punches)	UFC 38	July 13, 2002	1	4:35	London, England	
Win	4–0	Pete Williams	Submission (inside shoulder lock)	UFC 36	March 22, 2002	1	0:46	Las Vegas, Nevada, United States	
Win	3–0	Roberto Traven	Submission (armbar)	UFC 34	November 2, 2001	1	1:05	Las Vegas, Nevada, United States	
Win	2–0	Dan Quinn	Submission (triangle choke)	IFC: Warriors Challenge 15	August 31, 2001	1	2:15	Oroville, California, United States	
Win	1–0	Jerome Smith	Decision (unanimous)	HOOKnSHOOT: Showdown	July 14, 2001	2	5:00	Evansville, Indiana, United States	Heavyweight debut.

== Pay-per-view bouts ==
No	Event	Fight	Date	Venue	City	PPV buys
1.	UFC 100	Lesnar vs. Mir 2	July 11, 2009	Mandalay Bay Events Center	Las Vegas, Nevada	1,600,000
2.	UFC 119	Mir vs. Cro Cop	September 25, 2010	Conseco Fieldhouse	Indianapolis, Indiana	295,000
3.	UFC 146	Dos Santos vs Mir	May 26, 2012	MGM Grand Garden Arena	Las Vegas, Nevada	560,000

== Professional boxing record ==
1 fight	0 wins	1 loss
By decision	0	1

No.	Result	Record	Opponent	Type	Round, time	Date	Location	Notes
1	Loss	0–1	Steve Cunningham	UD	6	Apr 17, 2021	Mercedes-Benz Stadium, Atlanta, Georgia, U.S.	

== Triad combat record ==
1 fight	0 wins	1 loss
By knockout	0	1

No.	Result	Record	Opponent	Type	Round, time	Date	Location	Notes
1	Loss	0–1	Kubrat Pulev	TKO	1 (9) 1:59	November 27, 2021	Globe Life Field, Arlington, Texas, U.S.	

== See also ==
- List of male mixed martial artists

Awards and achievements
Preceded by Tim Sylvia	10th UFC Heavyweight Champion; June 19, 2004 – August 12, 2005; Stripped of title due to motorcycle accident injury	Vacant Title next held by Andrei Arlovski
Preceded by Antônio Rodrigo Nogueira	3rd UFC Interim Heavyweight Champion; December 27, 2008 – July 11, 2009; Lost unification bout against Brock Lesnar	Vacant Title next held by Shane Carwin
