= UFC Fight Night: Bigfoot vs. Mir =

UFC mixed martial arts event in 2015

- The poster for UFC Fight Night: Bigfoot vs. Mir
- Promotion: Ultimate Fighting Championship
- Date: February 22, 2015
- Venue: Ginásio Gigantinho
- City: Porto Alegre, Brazil
- Attendance: 5,080

Event chronology
UFC Fight Night: Henderson vs. Thatch	UFC Fight Night: Bigfoot vs. Mir	UFC 184: Rousey vs. Zingano

UFC Fight Night: Bigfoot vs. Mir (also known as UFC Fight Night 61) was a mixed martial arts event held on February 22, 2015, at the Ginásio Gigantinho in Porto Alegre, Brazil.

== Background ==
The event was the first that the UFC has hosted in the state of Rio Grande do Sul.

A light heavyweight bout between Rashad Evans and Glover Teixeira was expected to serve as the event headliner. However, on January 7, Teixeira was forced out of the bout as his knee, injured in his last fight, was slow to heal and he was unable to resume the proper training to prepare for the fight in that time frame. Evans is expected to be rebooked at a different event with possibly a new opponent.

A heavyweight bout between Antônio Silva and former UFC Heavyweight champion Frank Mir, previously scheduled for UFC 184, a week later, headlined the event.

A welterweight bout between Wendell Oliveira and TJ Waldburger, slated for the televised preliminary portion of the event, was cancelled on the day of the weigh-ins, after Waldburger passed out while cutting weight. Both fighters were paid their show money.

According to Nielsen, the main card broadcast on Fox Sports 1 drew an average 1.21 million US viewers, 35% higher than the network's average Fight Night. The prelims drew 831,000. Viewership peaked at 1.392 million during the Saenz vs Alcântara fight.

The event saw a record 10 of 11 underdogs win, following the first bout. This cost online gambling site Bovada nearly $1 million, including a $48,291 payout on a $1 parlay. Bovada sportsbook manager Kevin Bradley said this would make it hard to have a profitable 2015 in the combat sport market.

== Results ==
Main Card (Fox Sports 1)
Weight class				Method	Round	Time	Notes
Heavyweight	Frank Mir	def.	Antônio Silva	KO (punch and elbows)	1	1:40
Lightweight	Michael Johnson	def.	Edson Barboza	Decision (unanimous) (29–28, 30–27, 30–27)	3	5:00
Middleweight	Sam Alvey	def.	Cezar Ferreira	KO (punches)	1	3:34
Lightweight	Adriano Martins	def.	Rustam Khabilov	Decision (split) (29–28, 28–29, 29–28)	3	5:00
Bantamweight	Frankie Saenz	def.	Iuri Alcântara	Decision (unanimous) (30–27, 30–27, 29–28)	3	5:00
Welterweight	Santiago Ponzinibbio	def.	Sean Strickland	Decision (unanimous) (30–27, 30–27, 30–27)	3	5:00
Preliminary Card (Fox Sports 1)
Women's Bantamweight	Marion Reneau	def.	Jéssica Andrade	Submission (triangle choke)	1	1:54
Welterweight	Matt Dwyer	def.	William Macário	KO (superman punch)	1	3:14
Featherweight	Mike De La Torre	def.	Tiago Trator	TKO (punches)	1	2:59
Bantamweight	Douglas Silva de Andrade	def.	Cody Gibson	Decision (unanimous) (29–28, 30–27, 29–28)	3	5:00
Preliminary Card (UFC Fight Pass)
Lightweight	Ivan Jorge	def.	Josh Shockley	Decision (unanimous) (29–28, 29–28, 29–28)	3	5:00

== Bonus awards ==
The following fighters were awarded $50,000 bonuses:

- Fight of the Night: None awarded
- Performance of the Night: Frank Mir, Sam Alvey, Marion Reneau and Matt Dwyer

== See also ==
- List of UFC events
- 2015 in UFC
